= 2019 UTSA Roadrunners football team =

American college football season

2019 UTSA Roadrunners football
- Conference: Conference USA
- West Division
- Record: 4–8 (3–5 C-USA)
- Head coach: Frank Wilson (4th season)
- Offensive coordinator: Jeff Kastl (1st season)
- Offensive scheme: Pro-style
- Defensive coordinator: Jason Rollins (2nd season)
- Base defense: 4–3
- Home stadium: Alamodome

2019 Conference USA football standings
	Conf.			Overall
Team	W		L	W		L
East Division
Florida Atlantic xy$	7	–	1	11	–	3
Marshall	6	–	2	8	–	5
Western Kentucky	6	–	2	9	–	4
Charlotte	5	–	3	7	–	6
Middle Tennessee	3	–	5	4	–	8
FIU	3	–	5	6	–	7
Old Dominion	0	–	8	1	–	11
West Division
UAB xy	6	–	2	9	–	5
Louisiana Tech x	6	–	2	10	–	3
Southern Miss	5	–	3	7	–	6
North Texas	3	–	5	4	–	8
UTSA	3	–	5	4	–	8
Rice	3	–	5	3	–	9
UTEP	0	–	8	1	–	11
Championship: Florida Atlantic 49, UAB 6
$ – Conference champion; x – Division champion/co-champions; y – Championship game participant

The 2019 UTSA Roadrunners football team represented the University of Texas at San Antonio during the 2019 NCAA Division I FBS football season. The Roadrunners played their home games at the Alamodome in San Antonio, Texas and competed in the West Division of Conference USA (CUSA). They were led by fourth-year head coach Frank Wilson who was terminated at the end of the season.

== Preseason ==
=== Award watch lists ===
Listed in the order that they were released.

Award	Player	Position	Year
Wuerffel Trophy	Andrew Martel	LB	SR
Patrick Mannelly Award	Grant Merka	LS	SR

=== CUSA media poll ===
Conference USA released their preseason media poll on July 16, 2019, with the Roadrunners predicted to finish in fifth place in the West Division.

=== Preseason All-Conference USA teams ===
2019 Preseason All-Conference USA

All-CUSA Offense
Position	Player	Class
OL	Josh Dunlop	Sr.

All-CUSA Defense
Position	Player	Class
No players were selected

All-CUSA Special Teams
Position	Player	Class
KR	Brett Winnegan	Sr.

== Schedule ==
UTSA announced its 2019 football schedule on January 10, 2019. The 2019 schedule consisted of 6 home and 6 away games in the regular season.

Date	Time	Opponent	Site	TV	Result	Attendance
August 31	5:00 p.m.	Incarnate Word*	Alamodome; San Antonio, TX (Hometown Showdown)	ESPN3	W 35–7	26,787
September 7	3:00 p.m.	at Baylor*	McLane Stadium; Waco, TX	FSN	L 14–63	40,274
September 14	2:30 p.m.	Army*	Alamodome; San Antonio, TX	NFLN	L 13–31	30,718
September 21	6:30 p.m.	at North Texas	Apogee Stadium; Denton, TX	Stadium	L 3–45	19,922
October 5	7:00 p.m.	at UTEP	Sun Bowl; El Paso, TX	ESPN+	W 26–16	13,876
October 12	5:00 p.m.	UAB	Alamodome; San Antonio, TX	ESPN+	L 14–33	15,728
October 19	5:00 p.m.	Rice^{†}	Alamodome; San Antonio, TX	ESPN3	W 31–27	17,657
November 2	11:00 a.m.	at Texas A&M*	Kyle Field; College Station, TX	SECN	L 14–45	100,635
November 9	1:00 p.m.	at Old Dominion	S.B. Ballard Stadium; Norfolk, VA	ESPN3	W 24–23	16,297
November 16	5:00 p.m.	Southern Miss	Alamodome; San Antonio, TX	ESPN+	L 17–36	14,179
November 23	5:00 p.m.	Florida Atlantic	Alamodome; San Antonio, TX	ESPN+	L 26–40	14,335
November 30	2:30 p.m.	at Louisiana Tech	Joe Aillet Stadium; Ruston, LA	ESPN+	L 27–41	14,782
*Non-conference game; ^{†}Homecoming; Rankings from AP Poll and College Football Playoff Rankings after November 5 released prior to game; All times are in Central time

Schedule source:

== Game summaries ==
=== Incarnate Word ===
Hometown Showdown
Incarnate Word Cardinals at UTSA Roadrunners

Quarter	1	2	3	4	Total
Cardinals	0	7	0	0	7
Roadrunners	7	14	7	7	35

at Alamodome, San Antonio, Texas

- Date: August 31, 2019
- Game time: 5:00 p.m.
- Game weather: Indoors
- Game attendance: 26,787
- Referee: Joe Lehring
- TV announcers (ESPN3): Lincoln Rose (play-by-play), LaDarrin McLane (analyst)
- Box Score

Game information

First Quarter

- UTSA – 9:18 Carlos Strickland II 16 yard pass from Frank Harris, Hunter Duplessis kick
  UTSA 7–0 Drive: 5 plays, 40 yards, 2:24

Second Quarter

- UTSA – 14:27 Brenden Brady 10 yard run, Hunter Duplessis kick
  UTSA 14–0 Drive: 14 plays, 78 yards, 7:10
- UIW – 12:12 Ameer King 11 yard pass from Jon Copeland, Carson Mohr kick
  UTSA 14–7 Drive: 5 plays, 75 yards, 2:15
- UTSA – 7:38 Deven Boston 6 yard run, Hunter Duplessis kick
  UTSA 21–7 Drive: 10 plays, 65 yards, 4:34

Third Quarter

- UTSA – 9:26 Gavin Sharp 5 yard pass from Frank Harris, Hunter Duplessis kick
  UTSA 28–7 Drive: 7 plays, 59 yards, 3:31

Fourth Quarter

- UTSA – 9:53 Tykee Ogle-Kellogg 36 yard pass from Frank Harris, Hunter Duplessis kick
  UTSA 35–7 Drive: 7 plays, 91 yards, 3:36

Passing

- UIW – Jon Copeland 15/31, 181 YDS, 1 TD, 1 INT
- UTSA – Frank Harris 28/36, 206 YDS, 3 TD, 1 INT

Rushing

- UIW – Kevin Brown 6 ATT, 36 YDS
- UTSA – Frank Harris 15 ATT, 123 YDS

Receiving

- UIW – Lamont Johnson 5 REC, 70 YDS
- UTSA – Brenden Brady 5 REC, 47 YDS

=== At Baylor ===
Texas–San Antonio at Baylor – Game summary

Quarter	1	2	3	4	Total
Roadrunners	0	0	7	7	14
Bears	14	21	14	14	63

at McLane Stadium, Waco, TX

- Date: September 7
- Game time: 3:00 p.m. CDT
- Game weather: 99 °F (37 °C); fair
- Game attendance: 40,274
- Referee: David Alvarez
- TV: FOX Sports

Game information

First quarter

- (08:22) BAY TD – Denzel Mims 9-yard pass from Charlie Brewer, John Mayers kick
  Baylor 7–0; Drive: 4 plays, 70 yards, 1:23
- (00:43) BAY TD – Charlie Brewer 5-yard rush, John Mayers kick
  Baylor 14–0; Drive: 9 plays, 79 yards, 3:50

Second quarter

- (09:27) BAY TD – Denzel Mims 30-yard pass from Charlie Brewer, John Mayers kick
  Baylor 21–0; Drive: 8 plays, 72 yards, 4:02
- (07:09) BAY TD – Grayland Arnold 73-yard punt returned, John Mayers kick
  Baylor 28–0; Drive: 3 plays, 10 yards, 2:18
- (01:30) BAY TD – Denzel Mims 26-yard pass from Charlie Brewer, John Mayers kick
  Baylor 35–0; Drive: 9 plays, 75 yards, 4:06

Third quarter

- (11:25) BAY TD – Gerry Bohanon 3-yard rush, John Mayers kick
  Baylor 42–0; Drive: 8 plays, 70 yards, 3:35
- (06:11) BAY TD – JaMycal Hasty 1-yard rush, John Mayers kick
  Baylor 49–0; Drive: 6 plays, 82 yards, 2:50
- (00:03) UTSA TD – Sincere McCormick 2-yard rush, Hunter Duplessis kick
  Baylor 49–7; Drive: 16 plays, 79 yards, 6:08

Fourth quarter

- (12:22) UTSA TD – Sincere McCormick 54-yard rush, Hunter Duplessis kick
  Baylor 49–14; Drive: 4 plays, 65 yards, 1:46
- (08:30) BAY TD – Chris Platt 15-yard rush, Noah Rauschenberg kick
  Baylor 56–14; Drive: 2 plays, 16 yards, 0:43
- (05:33) BAY TD – Qualan Jones 61-yard rush, Noah Rauschenberg kick
  Baylor 63–14; Drive: 3 plays, 65 yards, 1:37

Top passers

- UTSA – Frank Harris – 15/24, 93 yards
- BAY – Charlie Brewer – 12/16, 163 yards, 3 TD

Top rushers

- UTSA – Sincere McCormick – 12 carries, 87 yards, 2 TD
- BAY – Gerry Bohanon – 7 carries, 93 yards, TD

Top receivers

- UTSA – Joshua Cephus – 2 receptions, 23 yards
- BAY – Denzel Mims – 7 receptions, 101 yards, 3 TD

Statistics	UTSA	Baylor
First downs	14	25
Total yards	266	546
Rushing yards	164	368
Passing yards	102	178
Turnovers	1	0
Time of possession	31:31	28:29

=== Army ===
	1	2	3	4	Total
Black Knights	10	0	7	14	31
Roadrunners	0	0	7	6	13

=== At North Texas ===
	1	2	3	4	Total
Roadrunners	0	3	0	0	3
Mean Green	7	17	14	7	45

=== At UTEP ===
	1	2	3	4	Total
Roadrunners	7	3	6	10	26
Miners	0	3	7	6	16

=== UAB ===
	1	2	3	4	Total
Blazers	3	13	7	10	33
Roadrunners	0	7	7	0	14

=== Rice ===
Rice at Texas–San Antonio – Game summary

Quarter	1	2	3	4	Total
Owls	3	7	14	3	27
Roadrunners	7	0	17	7	31

at Alamodome, San Antonio, TX

- Date: October 19, 2019
- Game time: 5:00 p.m. CDT
- Game weather: Temperature: 74 °F (23 °C) • Weather: Indoors
- Game attendance: 17,657
- Referee: Rodney Burnette
- TV announcers (ESPN3): Lincoln Rose (play-by-play), LaDarrin McClane (analyst) & Brooke Shoemaker (sideline)

Game information

First Quarter

- (06:03) RICE FG – Chris Barnes 31-yard field goal
  Drive: 13 plays, 71 yards, 7:23; Rice 3–0
- (00:59) UTSA TD – Zakhari Franklin 8-yard pass from Lowell Narcisse, Hunter Duplessis kick
  Drive: 13 plays, 60 yards, 5:04; UTSA 7–3

Second Quarter

- (00:16) RICE TD – August Pitre III 2-yard pass from Wiley Green, Chris Barnes kick
  Drive: 7 plays, 78 yards, 3:49; Rice 10–7

Third Quarter

- (14:50) UTSA TD – Rashad Wisdom 34-yard interception return, Lucas Dean pass intercepted
  Drive: 0 plays, 0 yards, 0:00; UTSA 13–10
- (12:33) RICE TD – Brad Rozner 19-yard pass from Tom Stewart, Chris Barnes kick
  Drive: 4 plays, 75 yards, 2:17; Rice 17–13
- (08:58) UTSA FG – Hunter Duplessis 34-yard field goal
  Drive: 11 plays, 58 yards, 3:35; Rice 17–16
- (03:09) RICE TD – Aston Walter 1-yard rush, Chris Barnes kick
  Drive: 2 plays, 22 yards, 0:47; Rice 24–16
- (00:49) UTSA TD – Sincere McCormick 6-yard rush, Sheldon Jones pass
  Drive: 6 plays, 75 yards, 2:20; Tied 24–24

Fourth Quarter

- (09:02) RICE FG – Chris Barnes 37-yard field goal
  Drive: 13 plays, 56 yards, 6:47; Rice 27–24
- (05:06) UTSA TD – Zakhari Franklin 8-yard pass from Lowell Narcisse, Hunter Duplessis kick
  Drive: 9 plays, 79 yards, 3:56; UTSA 31–27

Passing

- RICE – Wiley Green: 11/18, 135 yards, 1 TD, 1 INT
- UTSA – Lowell Narcisse: 19/29, 212 yards, 2 TD, 1 INT

Rushing

- RICE – Aston Walter: 18 carries, 109 yards, 1 TD
- UTSA – Sincere McCormick: 14 carries, 94 yards, 1 TD

Receiving

- RICE – Brad Rozner: 9 receptions, 138 yards, 1 TD
- UTSA – Carlos Strickland II: 6 receptions, 86 yards

Statistics	Rice	UTSA
First downs	21	19
Total yards	369	361
Rushing yards	146	149
Passing yards	223	212
Turnovers	4	1
Time of possession	34:44	25:16

=== At Texas A&M ===
	1	2	3	4	Total
Roadrunners	7	0	0	7	14
Aggies	14	7	14	10	45

Statistics

Statistics	UTSA	Texas A&M
First downs	14	23
Total yards	231	505
Rushing yards	93	267
Passing yards	138	238
Turnovers	1	1
Time of possession	24:17	35:43

Team	Category	Player	Statistics
UTSA	Passing	Lowell Narcisse	7–14, 90 yards
UTSA	Rushing	Lowell Narcisse	15 carries, 54 yards, TD
UTSA	Receiving	Zakhari Franklin	4 receptions, 46 yards
Texas A&M	Passing	Kellen Mond	16–21, 211 yards, TD
Texas A&M	Rushing	Isaiah Spiller	20 carries, 217 yards, 3 TD
Texas A&M	Receiving	Jhamon Ausbon	5 receptions, 90 yards

=== At Old Dominion ===
	1	2	3	4	Total
Roadrunners	10	0	0	14	24
Monarchs	10	10	3	0	23

=== Southern Miss ===
	1	2	3	4	Total
Golden Eagles	7	9	13	7	36
Roadrunners	7	3	7	0	17

=== Florida Atlantic ===
	1	2	3	4	Total
Owls	7	10	16	7	40
Roadrunners	3	0	8	15	26

=== At Louisiana Tech ===
Texas–San Antonio at Louisiana Tech – Game summary

Quarter	1	2	3	4	Total
Roadrunners	10	7	3	7	27
Bulldogs	14	10	10	7	41

at Joe Aillet Stadium, Ruston, LA

- Date: November 30
- Game time: 2:30 p.m. CST
- Game attendance: 14,782
- TV: ESPN+

Game information

First quarter

- (12:02) LT FG – Hunter Duplessis 28-yard field goal
  Louisiana Tech 3–0; Drive: 8 plays, 64 yards, 2:58
- (10:59) LT TD – Griffin Hebert 22-yard pass from J'Mar Smith, Bailey Hale kick
  Louisiana Tech 7–3; Drive: 4 plays, 66 yards, 1:03
- (03:21) LT TD – J'Mar Smith 5-yard rush, Bailey Hale kick
  Louisiana Tech 14–3; Drive: 4 plays, 85 yards, 1:43
- (00:16) UTSA TD – Brenden Brady 2-yard rush, Hunter Duplessis kick
  Louisiana Tech 14–10; Drive: 9 plays, 75 yards, 3:05

Second quarter

- (11:35) UTSA TD – Blaze Moorhead 0-yard fumble returned, Hunter Duplessis kick
  Texas–San Antonio 17–14; Drive: 7 plays, 29 yards, 2:39
- (08:39) LT TD – Isaiah Graham 39-yard pass from J'Mar Smith, Bailey Hale kick
  Louisiana Tech 21–17; Drive: 7 plays, 76 yards, 2:56
- (00:00) LT FG – Bailey Hale 34-yard field goal
  Louisiana Tech 24–17; Drive: 10 plays, 74 yards, 3:08

Third quarter

- (07:08) LT TD – James Jackson 17-yard interception returned, Bailey Hale kick
  Louisiana Tech 31–17; Drive: 5 plays, 9 yards, 2:23
- (04:52) UTSA FG – Hunter Duplessis 27-yard field goal
  Louisiana Tech 31–20; Drive: 7 plays, 42 yards, 2:16
- (01:17) LT FG – Bailey Hale 25-yard field goal
  Louisiana Tech 34–20; Drive: 8 plays, 67 yards, 3:35

Fourth quarter

- (12:46) LT TD – Griffin Hebert 24-yard pass from J'Mar Smith, Bailey Hale kick
  Louisiana Tech 41–20; Drive: 6 plays, 80 yards, 2:05
- (06:59) UTSA TD – Sincere McCormick 6-yard pass from Jordan Weeks, Hunter Duplessis kick
  Louisiana Tech 41–27; Drive: 3 plays, 68 yards, 0:47

Top passers

- LT – J'Mar Smith – 25/35, 331 yards, 3 TD
- UTSA – Jordan Weeks – 26/44, 280 yards, TD, 2 INT

Top rushers

- LT – Justin Henderson – 20 carries, 105 yards
- UTSA – Sincere McCormick – 17 carries, 119 yards

Top receivers

- LT – Griffin Hebert – 3 receptions, 92 yards, 2 TD
- UTSA – Sheldon Jones – 8 receptions, 115 yards

Statistics	UTSA	Louisiana Tech
First downs	17	24
Total yards	408	499
Rushing yards	128	168
Passing yards	280	331
Turnovers	2	2
Time of possession	27:45	32:15
