= 2019 FIU Panthers football team =

American college football season

2019 FIU Panthers football

Camellia Bowl, L 26–34 vs. Arkansas State
- Conference: Conference USA
- East Division
- Record: 6–7 (3–5 C-USA)
- Head coach: Butch Davis (3rd season)
- Offensive coordinator: Rich Skrosky (3rd season)
- Offensive scheme: Multiple
- Co-defensive coordinators: Jeff Copp (1st season); Jerod Kruse (1st season)
- Base defense: 4–3
- Home stadium: Riccardo Silva Stadium

2019 Conference USA football standings
	Conf.			Overall
Team	W		L	W		L
East Division
Florida Atlantic xy$	7	–	1	11	–	3
Marshall	6	–	2	8	–	5
Western Kentucky	6	–	2	9	–	4
Charlotte	5	–	3	7	–	6
Middle Tennessee	3	–	5	4	–	8
FIU	3	–	5	6	–	7
Old Dominion	0	–	8	1	–	11
West Division
UAB xy	6	–	2	9	–	5
Louisiana Tech x	6	–	2	10	–	3
Southern Miss	5	–	3	7	–	6
North Texas	3	–	5	4	–	8
UTSA	3	–	5	4	–	8
Rice	3	–	5	3	–	9
UTEP	0	–	8	1	–	11
Championship: Florida Atlantic 49, UAB 6
$ – Conference champion; x – Division champion/co-champions; y – Championship game participant

The 2019 FIU Panthers football team represented Florida International University (FIU) in the 2019 NCAA Division I FBS football season. The Panthers played their home games at Riccardo Silva Stadium in Miami, Florida, (except for the November 23rd game against UM which was played at Miami Marlins Park) and competed in the East Division of Conference USA (C-USA). They were led by third-year head coach Butch Davis. This would be the Golden Panthers' last bowl eligible season until 2025.

== Preseason ==
=== CUSA media poll ===
Conference USA released their preseason media poll on July 16, 2019, with the Panthers predicted to finish in second place in the East Division.

== Schedule ==
FIU announced its 2019 football schedule on January 10, 2019. The 2019 schedule consisted of 7 home and 5 away games in the regular season.

Date	Time	Opponent	Site	TV	Result	Attendance
August 31	8:00 p.m.	at Tulane*	Yulman Stadium; New Orleans, LA	ESPN3	L 14–42	16,361
September 7	7:00 p.m.	Western Kentucky	Riccardo Silva Stadium; Miami, FL	ESPN+	L 14–20	13,311
September 14	7:00 p.m.	New Hampshire*	Riccardo Silva Stadium; Miami, FL	ESPN3	W 30–17	11,756
September 20	8:00 p.m.	at Louisiana Tech	Joe Aillet Stadium; Ruston, LA	CBSSN	L 31–43	18,782
October 5	7:00 p.m.	UMass*^{†}	Riccardo Silva Stadium; Miami, FL	ESPN3	W 44–0	12,746
October 12	7:00 p.m.	Charlotte	Riccardo Silva Stadium; Miami, FL	ESPN+	W 48–23	16,834
October 19	7:00 p.m.	UTEP	Riccardo Silva Stadium; Miami, FL	ESPN+	W 32–17	13,951
October 26	3:30 p.m.	at Middle Tennessee	Johnny "Red" Floyd Stadium; Murfreesboro, TN	NFLN	L 17–50	9,512
November 2	12:00 p.m.	Old Dominion	Riccardo Silva Stadium; Miami, FL	ESPN+	W 24–17	14,644
November 9	6:00 p.m.	at Florida Atlantic	FAU Stadium; Boca Raton, FL (Shula Bowl)	Stadium	L 7–37	17,603
November 23	7:00 p.m.	Miami (FL)*	Marlins Park; Miami, FL	CBSSN	W 30–24	27,339
November 30	12:00 p.m.	at Marshall	Joan C. Edwards Stadium; Huntington, WV	CBSSN	L 27–30 ^{OT}	18,596
December 21	5:30 p.m.	vs. Arkansas State*	Cramton Bowl; Montgomery, AL (Camellia Bowl)	ESPN	L 26–34	16,209
*Non-conference game; ^{†}Homecoming; All times are in Eastern time

== Game summaries ==
=== At Tulane ===
Florida International at Tulane – Game summary

Quarter	1	2	3	4	Total
Panthers	0	7	7	0	14
Green Wave	7	21	14	0	42

at Yulman Stadium, New Orleans, LA

- Date: August 29
- Game time: 7:00 p.m. CDT
- Game weather: 89 °F (32 °C); clear, fair
- Game attendance: 16,361
- Referee: Jonathan Noll
- TV: ESPN3

Game information

First quarter

- (05:34) TULN TD – Tyrick James 18-yard pass from Justin McMillan, Merek Glover kick
  Tulane 7–0; Drive: 7 plays, 70 yards, 3:25

Second quarter

- (14:54) TULN TD – Amare Jones 7-yard rush, Merek Glover kick
  Tulane 14–0; Drive: 8 plays, 59 yards, 3:03
- (10:05) TULN TD – Corey Dauphine 14-yard rush, Merek Glover kick
  Tulane 21–0; Drive: 7 plays, 80 yards, 2:58
- (03:50) FIU TD – Anthony Jones 1-yard rush, Jose Borregales kick
  Tulane 21–7; Drive: 13 plays, 75 yards, 6:15
- (00:28) TULN TD – Justin McMillan 17-yard rush, Merek Glover kick
  Tulane 28–7; Drive: 3 plays, 25 yards, 0:43

Third quarter

- (10:04) TULN TD – Darnell Mooney 42-yard pass from Justin McMillan, Merek Glover kick
  Tulane 35–7; Drive: 6 plays, 70 yards, 2:38
- (07:57) TULN TD – Corey Dauphine 50-yard rush, Merek Glover kick
  Tulane 42–7; Drive: 1 play, 50 yards, 0:12
- (04:44) FIU TD – Shemar Thornton 17-yard pass from James Morgan, Jose Borregales kick
  Tulane 42–14; Drive: 7 plays, 75 yards, 3:13

Top passers

- FIU – James Morgan – 19/34, 208 yards, TD, INT
- TULN – Justin McMillan – 14/18, 199 yards, 2 TD

Top rushers

- FIU – Anthony Jones – 14 carries, 48 yards, TD
- TULN – Darius Bradwell – 13 carries, 90 yards

Top receivers

- FIU – Sterling Palmer – 2 receptions, 49 yards
- TULN – Darnell Mooney – 4 receptions, 84 yards, TD

Statistics	FIU	Tulane
First downs	16	28
Total yards	267	545
Rushing yards	59	350
Passing yards	208	195
Turnovers	2	1
Time of possession	26:18	33:42

=== Western Kentucky ===
	1	2	3	4	Total
Hilltoppers	7	7	3	3	20
Panthers	7	0	7	0	14

=== New Hampshire ===
	1	2	3	4	Total
Wildcats	10	0	7	0	17
Panthers	7	6	7	10	30

=== At Louisiana Tech ===
Florida International at Louisiana Tech – Game summary

Quarter	1	2	3	4	Total
Panthers	0	10	14	7	31
Bulldogs	0	13	14	16	43

at Joe Aillet Stadium, Ruston, LA

- Date: September 20
- Game time: 7:00 p.m. CST
- Game weather: 76 °F (24 °C); cloudy; Wind: S 5 mph
- Game attendance: 18,782
- Referee: Ken Antee
- TV: CBS Sports Network

Game information

Second quarter

- (14:56) LT FG – Bailey Hare 25-yard field goal
  Louisiana Tech 3–0; Drive: 13 plays, 73 yards, 5:48
- (12:24) FIU FG – Jose Borregales 36-yard field goal
  Tied 3–3; Drive: 7 plays, 51 yards, 2:32
- (09:26) LT TD – Justin Henderson 29-yard rush, Bailey Hare kick
  Louisiana Tech 10–3; Drive: 6 plays, 71 yards, 2:58
- (00:52) FIU TD – James Morgan 15-yard rush, Jose Borregales kick
  Tied 10–10; Drive: 9 plays, 74 yards, 2:45
- (00:00) LT FG – Bailey Hare 45-yard field goal
  Louisiana Tech 13–10; Drive: 6 plays, 28 yards, 0:52

Third quarter

- (13:24) FIU TD – Anthony Jones 2-yard rush, Jose Borregales kick
  Florida International 17–13; Drive: 4 plays, 75 yards, 1:36
- (08:50) LT TD – Justin Henderson 6-yard rush, Bailey Hare kick
  Louisiana Tech 20–17; Drive: 10 plays, 86 yards, 4:34
- (06:57) FIU TD – Shemar Thornton 31-yard pass from James Morgan, Jose Borregales kick
  Florida International 24–20; Drive: 4 plays, 60 yards, 1:53
- (04:16) LT TD – Justin Henderson 6-yard rush, Bailey Hare kick
  Louisiana Tech 27–24; Drive: 8 plays, 75 yards, 2:41

Fourth quarter

- (13:17) LT FG – Bailey Hare 41-yard field goal
  Louisiana Tech 30–24; Drive: 11 plays, 71 yards, 4:13
- (05:09) LT FG – Bailey Hare 25-yard field goal
  Louisiana Tech 33–24; Drive: 12 plays, 84 yards, 7:10
- (02:17) LT FG – Bailey Hare 29-yard field goal
  Louisiana Tech 36–24; Drive: 6 plays, 33 yards, 1:36
- (00:51) FIU TD – Anthony Jones 1-yard pass from James Morgan, Jose Borregales kick
  Louisiana Tech 36–31; Drive: 8 plays, 72 yards, 1:26
- (00:46) LT TD – Amik Robertson 30-yard kickoff returned, Bailey Hare kick
  Louisiana Tech 43–31; Drive: 0 plays, 0 yards, 0:00

Top passers

- LT – J'Mar Smith – 27/41, 290 yards, INT
- FIU – James Morgan – 29/41, 394 yards, 2 TD, INT

Top rushers

- LT – Justin Henderson – 15 carries, 141 yards, 3 TD
- FIU – Napoleon Maxwell – 8 carries, 78 yards

Top receivers

- LT – Griffin Hebert – 5 receptions, 78 yards
- FIU – Austin Maloney – 5 receptions, 113 yards

Statistics	FIU	Louisiana Tech
First downs	29	31
Total yards	526	565
Rushing yards	132	275
Passing yards	394	290
Turnovers	2	1
Time of possession	23:13	36:47

=== UMass ===
	1	2	3	4	Total
Minutemen	0	0	0	0	0
Panthers	17	17	10	0	44

=== Charlotte ===
	1	2	3	4	Total
49ers	10	7	6	0	23
Panthers	7	21	13	7	48

=== UTEP ===
	1	2	3	4	Total
Miners	7	0	0	10	17
Panthers	3	15	0	14	32

=== At Middle Tennessee ===
	1	2	3	4	Total
Panthers	7	10	0	0	17
Blue Raiders	14	0	23	13	50

=== Old Dominion ===
	1	2	3	4	Total
Monarchs	7	0	0	10	17
Panthers	3	6	7	8	24

=== At Florida Atlantic ===
	1	2	3	4	Total
Panthers	0	7	0	0	7
Owls	7	6	15	9	37

=== Miami (FL) ===
	1	2	3	4	Total
Hurricanes	0	0	3	21	24
Panthers	10	3	3	14	30

=== At Marshall ===
	1	2	3	4	OT	Total
Panthers	0	7	0	17	3	27
Thundering Herd	0	10	7	7	6	30

=== Vs. Arkansas State (Camellia Bowl) ===
Florida International vs. Arkansas State (Camellia Bowl) – Game summary

Quarter	1	2	3	4	Total
Panthers	0	13	10	3	26
Red Wolves	14	6	7	7	34

at Cramton Bowl • Montgomery, Alabama

- Date: Saturday, December 21, 2019
- Game time: 5:30 p.m. EST (4:30 p.m. CST)
- Game weather: Light rain • Temperature: 52 °F (11 °C) • Wind: ENE 7 mph
- Game attendance: 16,209
- Referee: Steve Varon
- TV announcers (ESPN): Taylor Zarzour (play-by-play), Matt Stinchcomb (analyst) and Alyssa Lang (sideline)
- ESPN game summary

Game information

First Quarter

- (9:25) ARST – Layne Hatcher 4 yard pass to Omar Bayless, Blake Grupe kick (Drive: 15 plays, 80 yards, 3:17; Arkansas State 7–0)
- (0:55) ARST – Layne Hatcher 9 yard pass to Kirk Merritt, Blake Grupe kick (Drive: 13 plays, 90 yards, 3:35; Arkansas State 14–0)

Second Quarter

- (12:50) FIU – Napoleon Maxwell 3 yard rush, José Borregales kick (Drive: 9 plays, 71 yards, 3:05; Arkansas State 14–7)
- (9:31) ARST – Blake Grupe 46 yard field goal (Drive: 10 plays, 47 yards, 3:19; Arkansas State 17–7)
- (5:30) FIU – José Borregales 25 yard field goal (Drive: 8 plays, 47 yards, 4:01; Arkansas State 17–10)
- (3:05) ARST – Blake Grupe 37 yard field goal (Drive: 8 plays, 59 yards, 2:25; Arkansas State 20–10)
- (0:40) FIU – José Borregales 25 yard field goal (Drive: 10 plays, 70 yards, 2:25; Arkansas State 20–13)

Third Quarter

- (12:22) ARST – Layne Hatcher 15 yard pass to Reed Tyler, Blake Grupe kick (Drive: 11 plays, 74 yards, 2:38; Arkansas State 27–13)
- (3:48) FIU – James Morgan 19 yard pass to Austin Maloney, José Borregales kick (Drive: 2 plays, 23 yards, 0:48; Arkansas State 27–20)
- (0:38) FIU – José Borregales 48 yard field goal (Drive: 5 plays, 50 yards, 1:16; Arkansas State 27–23)

Fourth Quarter

- (11:52) FIU – José Borregales 52 yard field goal (Drive: 6 plays, 32 yards, 2:02; Arkansas State 27–26)
- (3:37) ARST – Layne Hatcher 13 yard pass to Jonathan Adams, Blake Grupe kick (Drive: 5 plays, 80 yards, 1:33; Arkansas State 34–26)

=== Statistics ===
Statistics	FIU	ARST
First downs	23	31
Plays–yards	74–444	89–525
Rushes–yards	35–132	37–132
Passing yards	312	393
Passing: comp–att–int	22–39–2	27–52–1
Time of possession	31:40	28:20

Team	Category	Player	Statistics
FIU	Passing	James Morgan	22/38, 312 yards, 1 TD, 2 INT
FIU	Rushing	Napoleon Maxwell	13 carries, 66 yards, 1 TD
FIU	Receiving	Austin Maloney	10 receptions, 178 yards, 1 TD
Arkansas State	Passing	Layne Hatcher	27/51, 393 yards, 4 TD, 1 INT
Arkansas State	Rushing	Jamal Jones	10 carries, 59 yards,
Arkansas State	Receiving	Omar Bayless	9 receptions, 180 yards, 1 TD

== Players drafted into the NFL ==
Round	Pick	Player	Position	NFL Club
4	125	James Morgan	QB	New York Jets
7	221	Stantley Thomas-Oliver	CB	Carolina Panthers
