= Florida Atlantic Owls football =

Football team of Florida Atlantic University

2026 Florida Atlantic Owls football team
- First season: 2001; 25 years ago
- Athletic director: Vacant
- Head coach: Zach Kittley; 1st season, 4–8 (.333)
- Location: Boca Raton, Florida
- Stadium: Flagler Credit Union Stadium (capacity: 30,000)
- NCAA division: Division I FBS
- Conference: The American
- Colors: Blue and red
- All-time record: 129–172 (.429)
- Bowl record: 4–1 (.800)

Conference championships
- SBC: 2007 C-USA: 2017, 2019

Division championships
- C-USA East: 2017, 2019
- Consensus All-Americans: 1
- Rivalries: FIU (rivalry); South Florida (rivalry)
- Fight song: FAU Fight Song
- Mascot: Owlsley the Owl and Hoot the Owl
- Marching band: Florida Atlantic Marching Owls
- Website: fausports.com/football

The Florida Atlantic Owls football program represents Florida Atlantic University (FAU) in the sport of American football. The Owls compete in the Football Bowl Subdivision (FBS) of the National Collegiate Athletic Association (NCAA) in the American Conference. The Owls play their home games at Flagler Credit Union Stadium which has a seating capacity of 30,000.

== History ==
=== Howard Schnellenberger era (2001–2011) ===
Florida Atlantic University football began play in 2001 with legendary coach Howard Schnellenberger serving as head coach until 2011. Schnellenberger was a former offensive coordinator with the NFL's Indianapolis Colts and Miami Dolphins who, as a head coach, turned around a moribund Miami football program and won a national championship in his fifth season in 1983 after back to back nine win seasons in 1980 and 1981. Schnellenberger also turned around a downtrodden Louisville football program, winning the Fiesta Bowl in 1990.

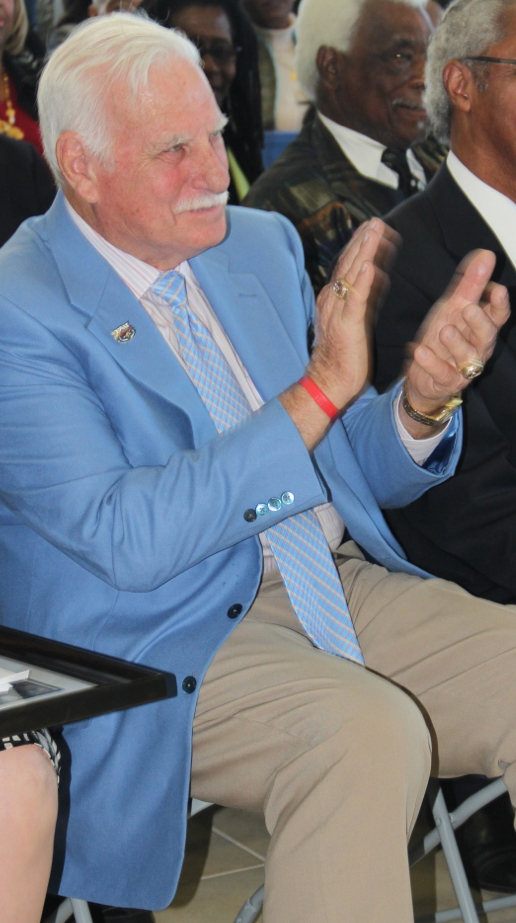
Coach Schnellenberger

After competing their first four years as an NCAA Division I-AA independent, the Owls moved to Division I-A and the Sun Belt Conference. Starting with the 2013–14 school year, FAU athletics have competed in Conference USA.

In 1998, Florida Atlantic University announced it was pursuing the creation of an NCAA football program and that Howard Schnellenberger was going to lead the charge, as director of football operations and head coach. After his success in rebuilding programs at Miami and Louisville, Coach Schnellenberger now undertook the role of building a program from scratch. Much like his time at Miami and Louisville, Coach Schnellenberger did not shy from placing lofty expectations and high goals on his newly created program. Even before FAU would play an intercollegiate game, Coach Schnellenberger explained the goal of FAU football would be to play the best teams it can schedule, in order for the program to aim for a national championship in Division I-A football. These extreme goals were not unusual from a man like Coach Schnellenberger. At Louisville, facing threats from the administration that the football team would be terminated, Schnellenberger made the bold (and now famous) prediction, "[We are] on a collision course with the national championship. The only variable is time."

On August 29, 2000, the first practice was held at the Boca Raton campus of FAU, and 164 students showed up to try out for the team. Florida Atlantic joined NCAA Division I-AA, now known as Division I FCS, as an independent team for the 2001 season. Its first-ever intercollegiate competition was against Slippery Rock University, which the Owls lost 40–7 in front of 25,632 fans at Joe Robbie Stadium, now known as Hard Rock Stadium.

The team finished its inaugural season at 4–6 and followed the next season at 2–9. Major accomplishments in its first two seasons include the program's first win, which came in its second game, against Bethune–Cookman, 31–28, and won in the first meeting with newly created South Florida rival, Florida International University, 31–21.

On September 15, 2007, FAU defeated its first Big Ten opponent with a 42–39 victory over Minnesota. Led by Rusty Smith, FAU beat Troy in the final game of the 2007 season to become Sun Belt Conference champions and received an invitation to the 2007 New Orleans Bowl, its first ever bowl bid. As a result, in just the seventh year of the football program's history, and the third year playing in Division I, Florida Atlantic set an NCAA mark by becoming the second-youngest program ever to receive an invitation to a bowl game. They were surpassed only by the undefeated 1958 Air Force Falcons, who had played just three years of Division 1 football before being invited to the Cotton Bowl, where they played to a scoreless tie against the TCU Horned Frogs on January 1, 1959.

On August 11, 2011, Howard Schnellenberger announced he would retire at the end of the season. The Owls ended the 2011 season 1–11, with the only victory coming from a 38–35 home win over UAB.

=== Carl Pelini era (2012–2013) ===
On December 1, 2011, FAU hired Carl Pelini, the Nebraska Cornhuskers defensive coordinator to become their new head coach, to succeed Schnellenberger.

On October 30, 2013, Pelini resigned from his position after another coach alleged to school officials that he was using illegal drugs, charges that Pelini denied. He, along with defensive coordinator Pete Rekstis, officially stepped down from their positions only three days before the school's homecoming game, which they won 34–17 under interim head coach Brian Wright. Under Pelini, the Owls compiled a 5–14 record.

Wright finished the 2012–13 season as the interim head coach, winning the team's last four games and led the Owls to its first bowl-eligible season since 2008–09. The Owls finished 6–6 for the season but were not invited to a bowl game.

=== Charlie Partridge era (2014–2016) ===
On December 16, 2013, FAU announced it had hired Charlie Partridge as head coach. Prior to accepting the job at FAU, Partridge was the defensive line coach at Arkansas. On November 27, 2016, FAU fired Partridge after 3 consecutive 3–9 seasons.

=== Lane Kiffin era (2017–2019) ===
In early December, Lane Kiffin was rumored to be under consideration for the head coaching position at several programs including the University of Houston, Louisiana State University, and the University of South Florida, among others. On December 12, 2016, it was announced that former USC and Tennessee head coach Lane Kiffin would become the Owls' next head coach. Kiffin resigned from FAU on December 7, 2019, after a 49–6 blowout win against the university of Alabama at Birmingham (UAB) and before FAU's Boca Raton Bowl appearance against SMU Mustangs to become the head coach at the University of Mississippi (Ole Miss). Kiffin left FAU with a record of 26–13 with two first-place finishes in Conference USA. In December 2019, FAU tight end Harrison Bryant won the John Mackey Award, becoming the first FAU player to win a major collegiate postseaon award, as well as becoming FAU's first consensus, and later unanimous, All-American. FAU's first year defensive coordinator, Glenn Spencer, was named the interim head coach to lead the Owls at the Boca Raton Bowl.

=== Willie Taggart era (2020–2022) ===
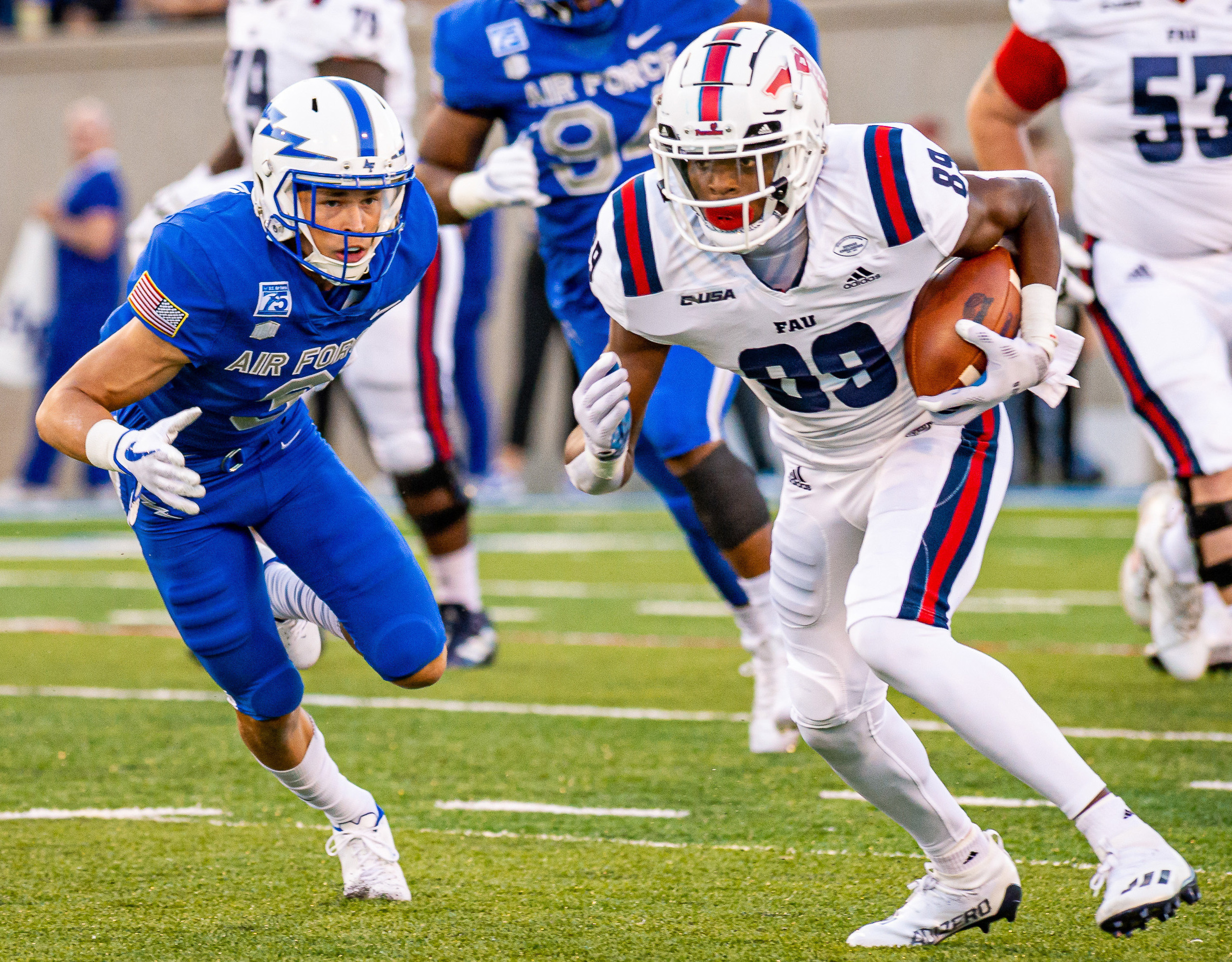
A game between Florida Atlantic and Air Force in 2021

On December 11, 2019, FAU announced the hiring of Willie Taggart as the next head coach. During a shortened season due to the COVID-19 pandemic with no prior spring practice, Taggart led the FAU Owls to a 5–4 record, which includes a loss to the Memphis Tigers in the first and only Montgomery Bowl. The loss signified a new low for the Owls as it marked the first bowl game defeat in program history.

On November 26, 2022, Taggart's Owls lost to the Western Kentucky Hilltoppers after a missed field goal that would have lifted the team into bowl eligibility. The Owls finished the season 5-7. He was fired on shortly after the loss, finishing his Owls' tenure with a 15–18 record. Defensive coordinator Todd Orlando served as interim head coach during the transition period to find a new head coach.

=== Tom Herman era (2023–2024) ===
On December 1, 2022, FAU announced the hiring of former Houston and Texas head coach Tom Herman as the next head coach. Herman was fired by FAU on November 18, 2024, after a 6–16 record through two seasons. FAU's assistant head coach, tight ends coach, and special teams coordinator Chad Lunsford served as interim head coach for the remainder of the season.

=== Zach Kittley era (2025–present) ===
Zach Kittley, former offensive coordinator at Houston Baptist, Western Kentucky, and Texas Tech, was hired as the next coach at FAU on December 2, 2024.

== Conference affiliations ==
- Independent (NCAA Division I-AA) (2001–2003)
- Independent (NCAA Division I-A) (2004)
- Sun Belt Conference (2005–2012)
- Conference USA (2013–2022)
- American Conference (2023–present)

== Championships ==
=== Conference championships ===
Florida Atlantic has won three conference championships, two outright and one shared.

Season	Conference	Coach	Overall Record	Conference Record
2007†	Sun Belt Conference	Howard Schnellenberger	8–5	6–1
2017	Conference USA	Lane Kiffin	11–3	8–0
2019	Conference USA	Lane Kiffin / Glenn Spencer‡	11–3	7–1

† Co-champions
‡ 2019 Boca Raton Bowl win coached by Glenn Spencer

=== Division championships ===
As a member of Conference USA since 2013, Florida Atlantic competes in the East Division. The Owls have won two division titles.

Season	Division	Coach	Opponent	CG result
2017	CUSA East	Lane Kiffin	North Texas	W 41–17
2019	CUSA East	Lane Kiffin	UAB	W 49–6

== Bowl games ==
Florida Atlantic has played in 5 bowl games, compiling a record of 4–1.

Season	Coach	Bowl	Opponent	Result
2007	Howard Schnellenberger	New Orleans Bowl	Memphis	W 44–27
2008	Howard Schnellenberger	Motor City Bowl	Central Michigan	W 24–21
2017	Lane Kiffin	Boca Raton Bowl	Akron	W 50–3
2019	Glenn Spencer (interim)	Boca Raton Bowl	SMU	W 52–28
2020	Willie Taggart	Montgomery Bowl	Memphis	L 10–25

== Head coaches ==
Coach	Tenure	Seasons	Record	Winning %
Howard Schnellenberger	2001–2011	11	58–74	.439
Carl Pelini	2012–2013	2	5–15	.250
Brian Wright (interim)	2013	1	4–0	1.000
Charlie Partridge	2014–2016	3	9–27	.250
Lane Kiffin	2017–2019	3	26–13	.667
Glenn Spencer (interim)	2019	1	1–0	1.000
Willie Taggart	2020–2022	3	15–18	.455
Tom Herman	2023–2024	2	6–16	.273
Chad Lunsford (interim)	2024	1	1–1	.500
Zach Kittley	2025–present	1	4–8	.333

== Rivalries ==
=== Florida International ===
The Shula Bowl is a bitter rivalry game with Florida International. It was first played in 2002 and has been played every year since then. The winner receives the Don Shula Award. The game and trophy are named after former Miami Dolphins head coach Don Shula. The game is typically either in Boca Raton or Miami, though there have been meetings in other locations in the Miami metropolitan area, including Hard Rock Stadium in Miami Gardens.

In total the two squads have met 21 times with Florida Atlantic holding a 16–5 lead as of the 2023 season conclusion. The 2005 game does not count with FIU having to vacate their victory due to NCAA violations and penalties.

Both schools have stated they will keep the rivalry alive as they will commence a five game series starting in 2024.

=== South Florida ===
The two schools first met in a single game to open the 2002 season at USF, a game that FAU lost handily 10–51. The two schools agreed to a three-game series in 2007, 2010, and 2013, with FAU hosting the first game and USF hosting the other two, where FAU lost the first two before getting their first win against USF in the third. Following those games, the two schools agreed to a home-and-home nonconference series set to be played in 2020 at FAU and 2026 at USF, before the COVID-19 pandemic and FAU joining the American in 2023 cancelled both respective games. The American protected the rivalry and the two have faced off every season 2023 onwards. The rivalry, now a conference game, would intensify following this, notably with FAU electing to go for an onside kick in 2023 with a 56–14 lead. USF would respond to this with plays in subsequent meetings viewed as retaliation. 2024 notably featured a physical and verbal postgame altercation between then-head coaches Tom Herman of FAU and Alex Golesh of USF, after Golesh slapped Herman's hand away from an attempted handshake.

== Notable alumni and personnel ==
=== Current NFL players ===
Player	Position	Team	First year	Draft round
Azeez Al-Shaair	LB	Houston Texans	2019	Undrafted
Harrison Bryant	TE	Houston Texans	2020	4
Trey Hendrickson	DE	Baltimore Ravens	2017	3
James Pierre Jr.	CB	Pittsburgh Steelers	2020	Undrafted
Devin "Motor" Singletary	RB	New York Giants	2019	3

=== Practice squad and Reserve ===
Player	Position	Team	Status	First year
Evan Anderson	DT	San Francisco 49ers	Reserve/Future	2024
Federico Maranges	C	Seattle Seahawks	Practice squad	2024
Zaire Mitchell-Paden	TE	New Orleans Saints	Injured reserve	2022
Brandon Walton	OT	Tampa Bay Buccaneers	Reserve/Future	2020

=== Former NFL Players ===
Player	Position	Teams	Years played	First year	Draft round
Brandin Bryant	DT	Cleveland Browns, Miami Dolphins, Buffalo Bills	2019–2022	2016	Undrafted
Trevon Coley	DT	Cleveland Browns, Indianapolis Colts, Arizona Cardinals, Tennessee Titans	2017–2022	2016	Undrafted
John Franklin III	WR	Chicago Bears, Tampa Bay Buccaneers	2019	2018	Undrafted
Rob Housler	TE	Arizona Cardinals, Chicago Bears, Cleveland Browns	2011–2015	2011	3
Gregory "Buddy" Howell, Jr.	RB	Houston Texans, Los Angeles Rams	2018–2021	2018	Undrafted
Lestar Jean	WR	Houston Texans	2012–2013	2012	Undrafted
Randell Johnson	OLB	Buffalo Bills, New York Jets	2014–2016	2014	7
Greg Joseph	K	Cleveland Browns, Tennessee Titans, Minnesota Vikings, New York Giants	2018–2024	2018	Undrafted
Cre'Von LeBlanc	CB	Chicago Bears, Detroit Lions, Philadelphia Eagles, Miami Dolphins	2016–2021	2016	Undrafted
Michael Lockley	LB	Jacksonville Jaguars	2011	2011	Undrafted
Herb Miller	CB	Tampa Bay Buccaneers, Cleveland Browns	2020–2022	2019	Undrafted
Alfred Morris	RB	Washington Redskins, Dallas Cowboys, San Francisco 49ers, Arizona Cardinals, New York Giants	2012–2020	2012	6
Sharrod Neasman	S	Atlanta Falcons, New York Jets	2016–2021	2016	Undrafted
Keith Reaser	CB	San Francisco 49ers, Kansas City Chiefs	2014–2017	2014	5
D'Joun Smith	CB	Indianapolis Colts, Tennessee Titans	2015–2016	2015	3
Rashard Smith	LB	Chicago Bears, Philadelphia Eagles	2020	2020	Undrafted
Rusty Smith	QB	Tennessee Titans	2010–2012	2010	6
Adarius Taylor	LB	Carolina Panthers, Tampa Bay Buccaneers, Cleveland Browns	2014–2020	2014	Undrafted
Lucky Whitehead	WR	Dallas Cowboys	2015–2016	2015	Undrafted
Kerrith Whyte	RB	Chicago Bears, Pittsburgh Steelers	2019	2019	7

== Future non-conference opponents ==
Announced schedules as of January 22, 2026.

2026	2027	2028	2029	2030	2031
at Florida	at FIU	at UCF		at Iowa	vs Missouri
vs FIU	vs ULM			at Missouri	
at ULM	at Missouri				
vs Texas Southern					

== Individual national award winners ==
John Mackey Award
Best Tight End
2019 – Harrison Bryant

=== Consensus/Unanimous All-Americans ===
10 Florida Atlantic players have been awarded as All-Americans, with one Florida Atlantic player being awarded as a consensus All-American, later becoming a unanimous All-American.

Consensus All-Americans
Year(s)	Name	Number	Position
2019	Harrison Bryant	40	TE
