= 2019 Boca Raton Bowl =

Postseason college football bowl game

2019 Cheribundi Boca Raton Bowl
- 6th Boca Raton Bowl
SMU Mustangs	Florida Atlantic Owls
(10–2)	(10–3)
The American	C-USA
28	52
Head coach: Sonny Dykes	Head coach: Glenn Spencer (interim)
	1	2	3	4	Total
SMU	0	14	0	14	28
Florida Atlantic	7	21	14	10	52
- Date: December 21, 2019
- Season: 2019
- Stadium: FAU Stadium
- Location: Boca Raton, Florida
- MVP: Chris Robison (QB, FAU), Rashad Smith (CB, FAU), Matt Hayball (P, FAU)
- Favorite: SMU by 7
- Referee: Kyle Olson (Sun Belt)
- Attendance: 23,187
- Payout: US$900,000

United States TV coverage
- Network: ABC & ESPN Radio
- Announcers: ABC: Tom Hart (play-by-play), Joey Galloway (analyst) and Pat McAfee (sideline); ESPN Radio: Dave LaMont (play-by-play), Rene Ingoglia (analyst) and Ed Aschoff (sideline)

The 2019 Boca Raton Bowl was a college football bowl game that was played on December 21, 2019, with kickoff at 3:30 p.m. EST on ABC. It was the 6th edition of the Boca Raton Bowl, and was one of the 2019–20 bowl games concluding the 2019 FBS football season. Sponsored by the Cheribundi beverage company, the game was officially known as the Cheribundi Boca Raton Bowl.

== Teams ==
This was the first time that Florida Atlantic and SMU had ever played each other.

=== SMU Mustangs ===
SMU finished their regular season with a 10–2 record (6–2 in conference). The Mustangs finished in third place in the West Division of the American Athletic Conference.

=== Florida Atlantic Owls ===
Florida Atlantic finished their regular season atop the East Division of Conference USA (C-USA), then defeated UAB in the C-USA Championship Game, 49–6. The Owls entered the bowl with a 10–3 record (7–1 in conference).

== Game summary ==
2019 Cheribundi Boca Raton Bowl

Quarter	1	2	3	4	Total
SMU	0	14	0	14	28
Florida Atlantic	7	21	14	10	52

at FAU Stadium • Boca Raton, Florida

- Date: Saturday, December 21, 2019
- Game time: 3:30 p.m. EST
- Game weather: Cloudy • Temperature: 76 °F (24 °C) • Wind: E 21 mph
- Game attendance: 23,187
- Referee: Kyle Olson
- TV announcers (ABC): Tom Hart (play-by-play), Joey Galloway (analyst) and Pat McAfee (sideline)
- ESPN game summary

Game information

First Quarter

- (3:11) FAU – B.J. Emmons 1 yard rush, Vladimir Rivas kick (Drive: 13 plays, 74 yards, 3:17; Florida Atlantic 7–0)

Second Quarter

- (14:05) SMU – Xavier Jones 1 yard rush, Kevin Robledo kick (Drive: 6 plays, 29 yards, 1:04; Tied 7–7)
- (7:48) FAU – James Charles 1 yard rush, Vladimir Rivas kick (Drive: 7 plays, 57 yards, 2:07; Florida Atlantic 14–7)
- (2:12) SMU – Xavier Jones 1 yard rush, Kevin Robledo kick (Drive: 14 plays, 55 yards, 5:36; Tied 14–14)
- (1:00) FAU – James Charles 15 yard rush, Vladimir Rivas kick (Drive: 7 plays, 75 yards, 1:12; Florida Atlantic 21–14)
- (0:36) FAU – Chris Robison 13 yard pass to Brandon Robinson, Vladimir Rivas kick (Drive: 1 play, 13 yards, 0:06; Florida Atlantic 28–14)

Third Quarter

- (6:23) FAU – Chris Robison 18 yard pass to John Raine, Vladimir Rivas kick (Drive: 6 plays, 71 yards, 2:09; Florida Atlantic 35–14)
- (4:05) FAU – Rashad Smith 34 yard fumble return, Vladimir Rivas kick (Florida Atlantic 42–14)

Fourth Quarter

- (13:09) FAU – Vladimir Rivas 38 yard field goal (Drive: 8 plays, 41 yards, 3:02; Florida Atlantic 45–14)
- (10:08) SMU – Ke'Mon Freeman 2 yard pass to Ryan Becker, Kevin Robledo kick (Drive: 7 plays, 75 yards, 3:01; Florida Atlantic 45–21)
- (3:17) FAU – Nick Tronti 23 yard pass to Javion Posey, Vladimir Rivas kick (Drive: 11 plays, 75 yards, 6:51; Florida Atlantic 52–21)
- (1:04) SMU – Shane Buechele 22 yard pass to James Proche, Kevin Robledo kick (Drive: 7 plays, 77 yards, 2:10; Florida Atlantic 52–28)

=== Statistics ===
Statistics	SMU	FAU
First downs	24	30
Plays–yards	84–425	83–521
Rushes–yards	34–120	44–188
Passing yards	305	333
Passing: comp–att–int	28–50–1	29–39–0
Time of possession	28:56	31:04

Team	Category	Player	Statistics
SMU	Passing	Shane Buechele	27/47, 303 yards, 1 TD, 1 INT
SMU	Rushing	Ke'Mon Freeman	15 carries, 52 yards
SMU	Receiving	Kylen Granson	7 receptions, 93 yards
Florida Atlantic	Passing	Chris Robison	27/37, 305 yards, 2 TD
Florida Atlantic	Rushing	B.J. Emmons	17 carries, 72 yards, 1 TD
Florida Atlantic	Receiving	Brandon Robinson	5 receptions, 78 yards, 1 TD
