= 2019 Southern Miss Golden Eagles football team =

American college football season

2019 Southern Miss Golden Eagles football

Armed Forces Bowl, L 13–30 vs. Tulane
- Conference: Conference USA
- West Division
- Record: 7–6 (5–3 C-USA)
- Head coach: Jay Hopson (4th season)
- Offensive coordinator: Buster Faulkner (1st season)
- Co-offensive coordinator: Scotty Walden (1st season)
- Offensive scheme: Pro spread
- Co-defensive coordinators: Tim Billings (2nd season); Derek Nicholson (2nd season)
- Base defense: Multiple
- Home stadium: M. M. Roberts Stadium

2019 Conference USA football standings
	Conf.			Overall
Team	W		L	W		L
East Division
Florida Atlantic xy$	7	–	1	11	–	3
Marshall	6	–	2	8	–	5
Western Kentucky	6	–	2	9	–	4
Charlotte	5	–	3	7	–	6
Middle Tennessee	3	–	5	4	–	8
FIU	3	–	5	6	–	7
Old Dominion	0	–	8	1	–	11
West Division
UAB xy	6	–	2	9	–	5
Louisiana Tech x	6	–	2	10	–	3
Southern Miss	5	–	3	7	–	6
North Texas	3	–	5	4	–	8
UTSA	3	–	5	4	–	8
Rice	3	–	5	3	–	9
UTEP	0	–	8	1	–	11
Championship: Florida Atlantic 49, UAB 6
$ – Conference champion; x – Division champion/co-champions; y – Championship game participant

The 2019 Southern Miss Golden Eagles football team represented the University of Southern Mississippi in the 2019 NCAA Division I FBS football season. The Golden Eagles played their home games at the M. M. Roberts Stadium in Hattiesburg, Mississippi, and competed in the West Division of Conference USA (CUSA). They were led by fourth-year head coach Jay Hopson.

== Preseason ==
=== CUSA media poll ===
Conference USA released their preseason media poll on July 16, 2019, with the Golden Eagles predicted to finish in second place in the West Division.

=== Preseason All-Conference USA teams ===
2019 Preseason All-Conference USA

Southern Miss had more defensive players selected than any team in the conference for the preseason all defensive team.

All-CUSA Offense
Position	Player	Class
WR	Quez Watkins	Jr.

All-CUSA Defense
Position	Player	Class
DL	DeMarrio Smith	Sr.
DL	Jacques Turner	Jr.
LB	Racheem Boothe	Jr.
DB	Ky’el Hemby	Jr.

All-CUSA Special Teams
Position	Player	Class
No players were selected

== Schedule ==
Southern Miss announced its 2019 football schedule on January 10, 2019. The 2019 schedule consisted of 5 home and 7 away games in the regular season.

Date	Time	Opponent	Site	TV	Result	Attendance
August 31, 2019	6:00 p.m.	Alcorn State*	M. M. Roberts Stadium; Hattiesburg, MS	ESPN+	W 38–10	31,076
September 7	2:30 p.m.	at Mississippi State*	Davis Wade Stadium; Starkville, MS	ESPNU	L 15–38	55,143
September 14	5:00 p.m.	at Troy*	Veterans Memorial Stadium; Troy, AL	ESPN+	W 47–42	27,108
September 21	11:00 a.m.	at No. 2 Alabama*	Bryant–Denny Stadium; Tuscaloosa, AL	ESPN2	L 7–49	101,821
September 28	6:00 p.m.	UTEP	M. M. Roberts Stadium; Hattiesburg, MS	ESPN+	W 31–13	23,337
October 12	6:00 p.m.	North Texas^{†}	M. M. Roberts Stadium; Hattiesburg, MS	Stadium Facebook	W 45–27	25,225
October 19	2:30 p.m.	at Louisiana Tech	Joe Aillet Stadium; Ruston, LA (Rivalry in Dixie)	NFLN	L 30–45	23,419
October 26	12:00 p.m.	at Rice	Rice Stadium; Houston, TX	ESPN+	W 20–6	20,367
November 9	2:30 p.m.	UAB	M. M. Roberts Stadium; Hattiesburg, MS	NFLN	W 37–2	23,819
November 16	5:00 p.m.	at UTSA	Alamodome; San Antonio, TX	ESPN+	W 36–17	14,179
November 23	2:30 p.m.	Western Kentucky	M. M. Roberts Stadium; Hattiesburg, MS	ESPN+	L 10–28	20,369
November 30	2:30 p.m.	at Florida Atlantic	FAU Stadium; Boca Raton, FL	NFLN	L 17–34	13,414
January 4, 2020	10:30 a.m.	vs. Tulane*	Amon G. Carter Stadium; Fort Worth, TX (Battle for the Bell, Armed Forces Bowl)	ESPN	L 13–30	38,513
*Non-conference game; ^{†}Homecoming; Rankings from AP Poll and CFP Rankings after November 5 released prior to game; All times are in Central time

Schedule source:

== Game summaries ==
=== Alcorn State ===
	1	2	3	4	Total
Braves	0	0	10	0	10
Golden Eagles	10	3	15	10	38

=== At Mississippi State ===
	1	2	3	4	Total
Golden Eagles	0	0	7	8	15
Bulldogs	7	14	7	10	38

=== At Troy ===
	1	2	3	4	Total
Golden Eagles	14	3	9	21	47
Trojans	7	7	7	21	42

=== At Alabama ===
	1	2	3	4	Total
Golden Eagles	0	7	0	0	7
No. 2 Crimson Tide	14	14	14	7	49

=== UTEP ===
	1	2	3	4	Total
Miners	0	6	7	0	13
Golden Eagles	14	10	7	0	31

=== North Texas ===
	1	2	3	4	Total
Mean Green	7	13	0	7	27
Golden Eagles	13	15	10	7	45

=== At Louisiana Tech ===
	1	2	3	4	Total
Golden Eagles	14	13	0	3	30
Bulldogs	7	17	0	21	45

=== At Rice ===
	1	2	3	4	Total
Golden Eagles	0	10	3	7	20
Owls	0	0	6	0	6

=== UAB ===
	1	2	3	4	Total
Blazers	0	2	0	0	2
Golden Eagles	7	13	10	7	37

=== At UTSA ===
	1	2	3	4	Total
Golden Eagles	7	9	13	7	36
Roadrunners	7	3	7	0	17

=== Western Kentucky ===
	1	2	3	4	Total
Hilltoppers	7	14	0	7	28
Golden Eagles	7	0	0	3	10

=== At Florida Atlantic ===
	1	2	3	4	Total
Golden Eagles	0	10	7	0	17
Owls	10	7	7	10	34

=== Vs. Tulane (Armed Forces Bowl) ===
	1	2	3	4	Total
Green Wave	0	6	24	0	30
Golden Eagles	13	0	0	0	13

== Players drafted into the NFL ==
Round	Pick	Player	Position	NFL Club
6	200	Quez Watkins	WR	Philadelphia Eagles
