= 2020 Armed Forces Bowl (January) =

Postseason college football bowl game

2020 Lockheed Martin Armed Forces Bowl
- 17th Armed Forces Bowl
Southern Miss Golden Eagles	Tulane Green Wave
(7–5)	(6–6)
C-USA	The American
13	30
Head coach: Jay Hopson	Head coach: Willie Fritz
	1	2	3	4	Total
Southern Miss	13	0	0	0	13
Tulane	0	6	24	0	30
- Date: January 4, 2020
- Season: 2019
- Stadium: Amon G. Carter Stadium
- Location: Fort Worth, Texas
- MVP: Justin McMillan (QB, Tulane) & Quez Watkins (WR, Southern Miss)
- Favorite: Tulane by 7
- Referee: Kevin Mar (Pac-12)
- Attendance: 38,513
- Payout: US$1,350,000

United States TV coverage
- Network: ESPN
- Announcers: Chris Cotter (play-by-play), Mark Herzlich (analyst) and Kelsey Riggs (sideline)

International TV coverage
- Network: ESPN Brasil
- Announcers: Ari Aguiar (play-by-play); Weinny Eirado (analyst)

The 2020 Armed Forces Bowl was a college football bowl game played on January 4, 2020, with kickoff at 11:30 a.m. EST (10:30 a.m. local CST) on ESPN. It was the 17th edition of the Armed Forces Bowl, and was one of the 2019–20 bowl games concluding the 2019 FBS football season. The game was officially known as the Lockheed Martin Armed Forces Bowl after its corporate sponsor Lockheed Martin.

== Teams ==
The game featured the Southern Miss Golden Eagles of Conference USA (C-USA) against the Tulane Green Wave of the American Athletic Conference (The American). This was the 31st all-time meeting between the two programs; the Golden Eagles entered the game leading the all-time series, 23–7. This was the first Armed Forces Bowl appearance for both programs.

From 1996 to 2013, Southern Miss and Tulane were both in C-USA as charter members, before Tulane left to join the American in 2014. Their regular season rivalry is set to resume in 2022. Since 1999, a bell trophy has been awarded to the winner of their rivalry game, making it the Battle for the Bell; the bell was also on the line in this Armed Forces Bowl.

=== Southern Miss Golden Eagles ===
Southern Miss entered the game with a 7–5 record (5–3 in conference). They finished in third place in the West Division of C-USA. The Golden Eagles also lost to the only ranked opponent they faced, Alabama. Southern Miss was 7–3 before losing their final two regular season games.

=== Tulane Green Wave ===
Tulane entered the game with a 6–6 record (3–5 in conference). They finished in fourth place in The American's West Division. The Green Wave lost to the only ranked opponent that they faced, Auburn. After starting their season 5–1, Tulane went 1–5 in the second half of their regular season.

== Game summary ==
2020 Lockheed Martin Armed Forces Bowl

Quarter	1	2	3	4	Total
Southern Miss	13	0	0	0	13
Tulane	0	6	24	0	30

at Amon G. Carter Stadium • Fort Worth, Texas

- Date: Saturday, January 4, 2020
- Game time: 11:30 a.m. EST (10:30 a.m. CST)
- Game attendance: 38,513
- Referee: Kevin Mar
- TV announcers (ESPN): Chris Cotter (play-by-play), Mark Herzlich (analyst) and Kelsey Riggs (sideline)
- ESPN game summary

Game information

First Quarter

- (12:07) USM – Jack Abraham 44 yard pass to Quez Watkins, kick failed (Drive: 8 plays, 61 yards, 2:53; Southern Miss 6–0)
- (5:23) USM – Jack Abraham 3 yard rush, Andrew Stein kick (Drive: 11 plays, 78 yards, 5:31; Southern Miss 13–0)

Second Quarter

- (12:41) TUL – Merek Glover 31 yard field goal (Drive: 10 plays, 51 yards, 3:47; Southern Miss 13–3)
- (4:37) TUL – Merek Glover 31 yard field goal (Drive: 7 plays, 34 yards, 3:12; Southern Miss 13–6)

Third Quarter

- (13:20) TUL – Justin McMillan 52 yard pass to Jalen McCleskey, Merek Glover kick (Drive: 5 plays, 77 yards, 1:34; Tied 13–13)
- (6:16) TUL – Merek Glover 36 yard field goal (Drive: 10 plays, 59 yards, 5:20; Tulane 16–13)
- (5:37) TUL – Justin McMillan 7 yard pass to Jacob Robertson Jr., Merek Glover kick (Drive: 1 play, 2 yards, 0:05; Tulane 23–13)
- (1:54) TUL – Justin McMillan 20 yard pass to Amare Jones, Merek Glover kick (Drive: 4 plays, 66 yards, 1:40; Tulane 30–13)

Fourth Quarter
No scoring

=== Statistics ===
Statistics	USM	TUL
First downs	15	19
Plays–yards	68–359	66–379
Rushes–yards	23–58	48–164
Passing yards	301	215
Passing: comp–att–int	26–45–2	13–18–0
Time of possession	26:07	33:53

Team	Category	Player	Statistics
Southern Miss	Passing	Jack Abraham	17/23, 167 yards, 1 TD
Southern Miss	Rushing	Trivenskey Mosely	7 carries, 43 yards
Southern Miss	Receiving	Quez Watkins	8 receptions, 121 yards, 1 TD
Tulane	Passing	Justin McMillan	13/18, 215 yards, 3 TD
Tulane	Rushing	Cameron Carroll	9 carries, 48 yards
Tulane	Receiving	Jalen McCleskey	2 receptions, 87 yards, 1 TD
