= 2019 Old Dominion Monarchs football team =

American college football season

2019 Old Dominion Monarchs football
- Conference: Conference USA
- East Division
- Record: 1–11 (0–8 C-USA)
- Head coach: Bobby Wilder (11th season)
- Offensive coordinator: Brian Scott (11th season)
- Offensive scheme: Hurry-up spread option
- Co-defensive coordinators: David Blackwell (1st season); Grady Brown (1st season)
- Base defense: 3–4
- Home stadium: S.B. Ballard Stadium

2019 Conference USA football standings
	Conf.			Overall
Team	W		L	W		L
East Division
Florida Atlantic xy$	7	–	1	11	–	3
Marshall	6	–	2	8	–	5
Western Kentucky	6	–	2	9	–	4
Charlotte	5	–	3	7	–	6
Middle Tennessee	3	–	5	4	–	8
FIU	3	–	5	6	–	7
Old Dominion	0	–	8	1	–	11
West Division
UAB xy	6	–	2	9	–	5
Louisiana Tech x	6	–	2	10	–	3
Southern Miss	5	–	3	7	–	6
North Texas	3	–	5	4	–	8
UTSA	3	–	5	4	–	8
Rice	3	–	5	3	–	9
UTEP	0	–	8	1	–	11
Championship: Florida Atlantic 49, UAB 6
$ – Conference champion; x – Division champion/co-champions; y – Championship game participant

The 2019 Old Dominion Monarchs football team represented Old Dominion University in the 2019 NCAA Division I FBS football season. The Monarchs played their home games at S.B. Ballard Stadium in Norfolk, Virginia and competed in the East Division of Conference USA (CUSA). They were led by eleventh-year head coach Bobby Wilder.

== Preseason ==
=== CUSA media poll ===
Conference USA released their preseason media poll on July 16, 2019, with the Monarchs predicted to finish in sixth place in the East Division.

=== Preseason All–Conference USA teams ===
The Monarchs were the only team in the East Division that had no players selected to the preseason All−Conference USA teams.

== Schedule ==
Old Dominion announced its 2019 football schedule on January 10, 2019. The 2019 schedule consisted of 6 home and away games in the regular season.

Date	Time	Opponent	Site	TV	Result	Attendance
August 31	7:00 p.m.	Norfolk State*	S.B. Ballard Stadium; Norfolk, VA (rivalry)	ESPN3	W 24–21	21,944
September 7	12:00 p.m.	at Virginia Tech*	Lane Stadium; Blacksburg, VA	ESPNU	L 17–31	57,282
September 21	7:00 p.m.	at No. 21 Virginia*	Scott Stadium; Charlottesville, VA	ESPN2	L 17–28	44,573
September 28	6:00 p.m.	East Carolina*	S.B. Ballard Stadium; Norfolk, VA	ESPN+	L 21–24	18,643
October 5	6:00 p.m.	Western Kentucky	S.B. Ballard Stadium; Norfolk, VA	ESPN+	L 3–20	18,405
October 12	2:30 p.m.	at Marshall	Joan C. Edwards Stadium; Huntington, WV	Stadium	L 17–31	18,351
October 19	4:00 p.m.	at UAB	Legion Field; Birmingham, AL	ESPN+	L 14–38	19,511
October 26	3:30 p.m.	Florida Atlantic^{†}	S.B. Ballard Stadium; Norfolk, VA	ESPN+	L 3–41	17,744
November 2	12:00 p.m.	at FIU	Riccardo Silva Stadium; Miami, FL	ESPN+	L 17–24	14,644
November 9	2:00 p.m.	UTSA	S.B. Ballard Stadium; Norfolk, VA	ESPN3	L 23–24	16,297
November 23	4:30 p.m.	at Middle Tennessee	Johnny "Red" Floyd Stadium; Murfreesboro, TN	ESPN3	L 17–38	9,806
November 30	2:00 p.m.	Charlotte	S.B. Ballard Stadium; Norfolk, VA (Oyster Bowl)	ESPN+	L 22–38	16,369
*Non-conference game; ^{†}Homecoming; Rankings from AP Poll and CFP Rankings after November 5 released prior to game; All times are in Eastern time

== Personnel ==
=== Coaching staff ===
Staff for 2019 season.

Name	Position	Tenure
Bobby Wilder	Head coach	10
Brian Scott	Associate head coach/offensive coordinator	10
David Blackwell	Defensive coordinator/linebackers	1
Kermit Buggs	Assistant Defensive coordinator	3
Jeff Comissiong	Assistant head coach/defensive line	4
Ron Whitcomb	Assistant head coach for offense/quarterbacks	10
Grady Brown	Secondary	1
Brian Stinespring	Tight Ends	1
John Allen	Wide Receivers Coach	2
Charles Bankins	Running Backs/Special Teams coordinator	4
Frank Wilson	Special Teams Co-Coordinator / Cornerbacks	4

== Game summaries ==
=== Norfolk State ===
	1	2	3	4	Total
Spartans	0	6	0	15	21
Monarchs	14	0	3	7	24

=== At Virginia Tech ===
	1	2	3	4	Total
Monarchs	3	0	7	7	17
Hokies	10	7	7	7	31

=== At Virginia ===
	1	2	3	4	Total
Monarchs	10	7	0	0	17
No. 21 Cavaliers	0	7	7	14	28

=== East Carolina ===
	1	2	3	4	Total
Pirates	10	7	0	7	24
Monarchs	3	0	10	8	21

=== Western Kentucky ===
	1	2	3	4	Total
Hilltoppers	0	10	3	7	20
Monarchs	0	3	0	0	3

=== At Marshall ===
	1	2	3	4	Total
Monarchs	0	10	7	0	17
Thundering Herd	7	10	7	7	31

=== At UAB ===
	1	2	3	4	Total
Monarchs	0	3	11	0	14
Blazers	14	14	7	3	38

=== Florida Atlantic ===
	1	2	3	4	Total
Owls	14	10	7	10	41
Monarchs	0	3	0	0	3

=== At FIU ===
	1	2	3	4	Total
Monarchs	7	0	0	10	17
Panthers	3	6	7	8	24

=== UTSA ===
	1	2	3	4	Total
Roadrunners	10	0	0	14	24
Monarchs	10	10	3	0	23

=== At Middle Tennessee ===
	1	2	3	4	Total
Monarchs	7	3	7	0	17
Blue Raiders	14	14	7	3	38

=== Charlotte ===
	1	2	3	4	Total
49ers	14	10	14	0	38
Monarchs	7	0	7	8	22
