= 2019 Western Kentucky Hilltoppers football team =

American college football season

2019 Western Kentucky Hilltoppers football

First Responder Bowl champion

First Responder Bowl, W 23–20 vs. Western Michigan
- Conference: Conference USA
- East Division
- Record: 9–4 (6–2 C-USA)
- Head coach: Tyson Helton (1st season)
- Offensive coordinator: Bryan Ellis (1st season)
- Offensive scheme: Multiple
- Defensive coordinator: Clayton White (3rd season)
- Base defense: 4–2–5
- Home stadium: Houchens Industries–L. T. Smith Stadium

2019 Conference USA football standings
	Conf.			Overall
Team	W		L	W		L
East Division
Florida Atlantic xy$	7	–	1	11	–	3
Marshall	6	–	2	8	–	5
Western Kentucky	6	–	2	9	–	4
Charlotte	5	–	3	7	–	6
Middle Tennessee	3	–	5	4	–	8
FIU	3	–	5	6	–	7
Old Dominion	0	–	8	1	–	11
West Division
UAB xy	6	–	2	9	–	5
Louisiana Tech x	6	–	2	10	–	3
Southern Miss	5	–	3	7	–	6
North Texas	3	–	5	4	–	8
UTSA	3	–	5	4	–	8
Rice	3	–	5	3	–	9
UTEP	0	–	8	1	–	11
Championship: Florida Atlantic 49, UAB 6
$ – Conference champion; x – Division champion/co-champions; y – Championship game participant

The 2019 Western Kentucky Hilltoppers football team (WKU) represented Western Kentucky University in the 2019 NCAA Division I FBS football season. The Hilltoppers played their home games at the Houchens Industries–L. T. Smith Stadium in Bowling Green, Kentucky, as members of the East Division of Conference USA (C–USA). They were led by first-year head coach Tyson Helton.

== Preseason ==
=== Award watch lists ===
Listed in the order that they were released

Award	Player	Position	Year
Rimington Trophy	Seth Joest	C	JR
John Mackey Award	Kyle Fourtenbary	TE	JR
Outland Trophy	Miles Pate	T	SR
Wuerffel Trophy	Tyler Witt	OL	JR

=== Preseason media poll ===
The preseason poll was released prior to the Conference USA media days on July 17–18, 2019. The Hilltoppers were predicted to finish in fifth place in the C–USA East Division.

=== Preseason All–Conference USA teams ===
2019 Preseason All-Conference USA

All-CUSA Offense
Position	Player	Class
OL	Miles Pate	Sr.

All-CUSA Defense
Position	Player	Class
No players were selected

All-CUSA Special Teams
Position	Player	Class
No players were selected

== Schedule ==
Date	Time	Opponent	Site	TV	Result	Attendance
August 29	6:30 p.m.	No. 25 (FCS) Central Arkansas*	Houchens Industries–L. T. Smith Stadium; Bowling Green, KY	ESPN+	L 28–35	17,120
September 7	6:00 p.m.	at FIU	Riccardo Silva Stadium; Miami, FL	ESPN+	W 20–14	13,311
September 14	3:00 p.m.	vs. Louisville*	Nissan Stadium; Nashville, TN	Stadium	L 21–38	22,665
September 28	6:00 p.m.	UAB	Houchens Industries–L. T. Smith Stadium; Bowling Green, KY	ESPN+	W 20–13	20,304
October 5	5:00 p.m.	at Old Dominion	S.B. Ballard Stadium; Norfolk, VA	ESPN+	W 20–3	18,405
October 12	6:00 p.m.	Army*	Houchens Industries–L. T. Smith Stadium; Bowling Green, KY	Stadium	W 17–8	16,107
October 19	3:00 p.m.	Charlotte^{†}	Houchens Industries–L. T. Smith Stadium; Bowling Green, KY	ESPN+	W 30–14	15,816
October 26	1:30 p.m.	at Marshall	Joan C. Edwards Stadium; Huntington, WV	Stadium Facebook	L 23–26	22,099
November 2	3:00 p.m.	Florida Atlantic	Houchens Industries–L. T. Smith Stadium; Bowling Green, KY	ESPN+	L 24–35	14,212
November 9	11:00 a.m.	at Arkansas*	Donald W. Reynolds Razorback Stadium; Fayetteville, AR	SECN	W 45–19	42,985
November 23	2:30 p.m.	at Southern Miss	M. M. Roberts Stadium; Hattiesburg, MS	ESPN+	W 28–10	20,369
November 30	1:00 p.m.	Middle Tennessee	Houchens Industries–L. T. Smith Stadium; Bowling Green, KY (100 Miles of Hate)	ESPN+	W 31–26	7,589
December 30	11:30 a.m.	vs. Western Michigan	Gerald J. Ford Stadium; Dallas, TX (First Responder Bowl)	ESPN	W 23–20	13,164
*Non-conference game; ^{†}Homecoming; Rankings from AP Poll and College Football Playoff Rankings after November 5 released prior to game; All times are in Central time

== Game summaries ==
=== Central Arkansas ===
	1	2	3	4	Total
Bears	0	14	0	21	35
Hilltoppers	14	7	7	0	28

=== At FIU ===
	1	2	3	4	Total
Hilltoppers	7	7	3	3	20
Panthers	7	0	7	0	14

=== Vs. Louisville ===
	1	2	3	4	Total
Hilltoppers	0	7	7	7	21
Cardinals	7	24	7	0	38

=== UAB ===
	1	2	3	4	Total
Blazers	3	7	3	0	13
Hilltoppers	3	10	0	7	20

=== At Old Dominion ===
	1	2	3	4	Total
Hilltoppers	0	10	3	7	20
Monarchs	0	3	0	0	3

=== Army ===
	1	2	3	4	Total
Black Knights	0	0	0	8	8
Hilltoppers	7	0	3	7	17

=== Charlotte ===
	1	2	3	4	Total
49ers	7	7	0	0	14
Hilltoppers	7	10	13	0	30

=== At Marshall ===
	1	2	3	4	Total
Hilltoppers	0	7	6	10	23
Thundering Herd	14	6	3	3	26

=== Florida Atlantic ===
	1	2	3	4	Total
Owls	0	21	7	7	35
Hilltoppers	14	0	7	3	24

=== At Arkansas ===
	1	2	3	4	Total
Hilltoppers	14	21	3	7	45
Razorbacks	7	0	0	12	19

=== At Southern Miss ===
	1	2	3	4	Total
Hilltoppers	7	14	0	7	28
Golden Eagles	7	0	0	3	10

=== Middle Tennessee ===
	1	2	3	4	Total
Blue Raiders	3	10	0	13	26
Hilltoppers	3	7	7	14	31

=== Vs. Western Michigan (First Responder Bowl) ===
	1	2	3	4	Total
Broncos	3	7	7	3	20
Hilltoppers	0	10	0	13	23
