= 2019 Marshall Thundering Herd football team =

American college football season

2019 Marshall Thundering Herd football

Gasparilla Bowl, L 25–48 vs. UCF
- Conference: Conference USA
- East Division
- Record: 8–5 (6–2 C-USA)
- Head coach: Doc Holliday (10th season)
- Offensive coordinator: Tim Cramsey (2nd season)
- Offensive scheme: Pro spread
- Co-defensive coordinators: J. C. Price (1st season); Brad Lambert (1st season)
- Base defense: 4–2–5
- Home stadium: Joan C. Edwards Stadium

2019 Conference USA football standings
	Conf.			Overall
Team	W		L	W		L
East Division
Florida Atlantic xy$	7	–	1	11	–	3
Marshall	6	–	2	8	–	5
Western Kentucky	6	–	2	9	–	4
Charlotte	5	–	3	7	–	6
Middle Tennessee	3	–	5	4	–	8
FIU	3	–	5	6	–	7
Old Dominion	0	–	8	1	–	11
West Division
UAB xy	6	–	2	9	–	5
Louisiana Tech x	6	–	2	10	–	3
Southern Miss	5	–	3	7	–	6
North Texas	3	–	5	4	–	8
UTSA	3	–	5	4	–	8
Rice	3	–	5	3	–	9
UTEP	0	–	8	1	–	11
Championship: Florida Atlantic 49, UAB 6
$ – Conference champion; x – Division champion/co-champions; y – Championship game participant

The 2019 Marshall Thundering Herd football team represented Marshall University in the 2019 NCAA Division I FBS football season. The Thundering Herd played their home games at Joan C. Edwards Stadium in Huntington, West Virginia, and competed in the East Division of Conference USA (CUSA). They were led by tenth-year head coach Doc Holliday. They lost to UCF in Gasparilla bowl.

== Preseason ==
=== CUSA media poll ===
Conference USA released their preseason media poll on July 16, 2019, with the Thundering Herd predicted to finish in first place in the East Division.

== Schedule ==
Marshall announced its 2019 football schedule on January 10, 2019. The 2019 schedule consists of 7 home and 5 away games in the regular season.

Date	Time	Opponent	Site	TV	Result	Attendance
August 31	6:30 p.m.	VMI*	Joan C. Edwards Stadium; Huntington, WV	Stadium	W 56–17	23,875
September 6	9:00 p.m.	at No. 24 Boise State*	Albertsons Stadium; Boise, ID	ESPN2	L 7–14	31,951
September 14	6:30 p.m.	Ohio*	Joan C. Edwards Stadium; Huntington, WV (Battle for the Bell)	Stadium Facebook	W 33–31	27,323
September 28	5:00 p.m.	Cincinnati*	Joan C. Edwards Stadium; Huntington, WV	CBSSN Facebook	L 14–52	32,192
October 5	3:30 p.m.	at Middle Tennessee	Johnny "Red" Floyd Stadium; Murfreesboro, TN	CBSSN Facebook	L 13–24	15,023
October 12	2:30 p.m.	Old Dominion	Joan C. Edwards Stadium; Huntington, WV	Stadium	W 31–17	18,351
October 18	6:30 p.m.	at Florida Atlantic	FAU Stadium; Boca Raton, FL	CBSSN	W 36–31	15,138
October 26	2:30 p.m.	Western Kentucky^{†}	Joan C. Edwards Stadium; Huntington, WV (Moonshine Throwdown)	Stadium Facebook	W 26–23	22,099
November 2	3:30 p.m.	at Rice	Rice Stadium; Houston, TX	Stadium Facebook	W 20–7	17,385
November 15	7:00 p.m.	Louisiana Tech	Joan C. Edwards Stadium; Huntington, WV	CBSSN	W 31–10	19,893
November 23	3:30 p.m.	at Charlotte	Jerry Richardson Stadium; Charlotte, NC	Stadium Facebook	L 13–24	10,526
November 30	12:00 p.m.	FIU	Joan C. Edwards Stadium; Huntington, WV	CBSSN	W 30–27 ^{OT}	18,596
December 23	2:30 p.m.	vs. UCF*	Raymond James Stadium; Tampa, FL (Gasparilla Bowl)	ESPN	L 25–48	28,987
*Non-conference game; ^{†}Homecoming; Rankings from AP Poll and CFP Rankings after November 5 released prior to game; All times are in Eastern time

Schedule source:

== Game summaries ==
=== VMI ===
	1	2	3	4	Total
Keydets	0	7	0	10	17
Thundering Herd	14	21	14	7	56

=== At Boise State ===
	1	2	3	4	Total
Thundering Herd	7	0	0	0	7
No. 24 Broncos	0	7	7	0	14

=== Ohio ===
	1	2	3	4	Total
Bobcats	3	14	7	7	31
Thundering Herd	10	17	0	6	33

=== Cincinnati ===
	1	2	3	4	Total
Bearcats	14	14	17	7	52
Thundering Herd	0	0	0	14	14

=== At Middle Tennessee ===
	1	2	3	4	Total
Thundering Herd	7	6	0	0	13
Blue Raiders	10	7	0	7	24

=== Old Dominion ===
	1	2	3	4	Total
Monarchs	0	10	7	0	17
Thundering Herd	7	10	7	7	31

=== At Florida Atlantic ===
	1	2	3	4	Total
Thundering Herd	10	7	5	14	36
Owls	14	3	0	14	31

=== Western Kentucky ===
	1	2	3	4	Total
Hilltoppers	0	7	6	10	23
Thundering Herd	14	6	3	3	26

=== At Rice ===
	1	2	3	4	Total
Thundering Herd	3	14	3	0	20
Owls	0	7	0	0	7

=== Louisiana Tech ===
	1	2	3	4	Total
Bulldogs	7	0	3	0	10
Thundering Herd	0	17	7	7	31

=== At Charlotte ===
	1	2	3	4	Total
Thundering Herd	7	3	3	0	13
49ers	0	7	3	14	24

=== FIU ===
	1	2	3	4	OT	Total
Panthers	0	7	0	17	3	27
Thundering Herd	0	10	7	7	6	30

=== Vs. UCF (Gasparilla Bowl) ===
	1	2	3	4	Total
Thundering Herd	0	7	18	3	28
Knights	21	3	21	0	45

== Players drafted into the NFL ==
Round	Pick	Player	Position	NFL Club
5	159	Justin Rohrwasser	K	New England Patriots
7	243	Chris Jackson	S	Tennessee Titans
