= 2019 North Texas Mean Green football team =

American college football season

2019 North Texas Mean Green football
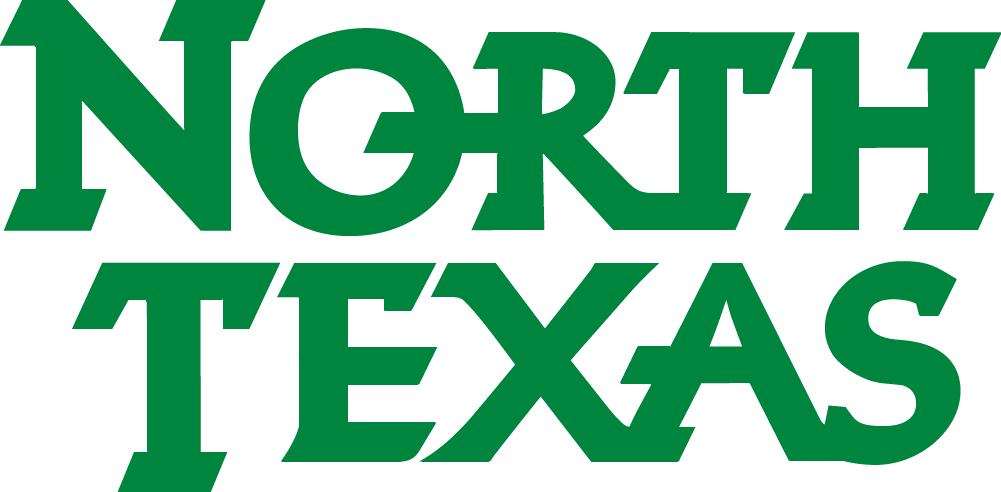
- Conference: Conference USA
- West Division
- Record: 4–8 (3–5 C-USA)
- Head coach: Seth Littrell (4th season)
- Offensive coordinator: Bodie Reeder (1st season)
- Co-offensive coordinator: Tommy Mainord (1st season)
- Offensive scheme: Spread
- Defensive coordinator: Troy Reffett (4th season)
- Base defense: 3–3–5
- Home stadium: Apogee Stadium

2019 Conference USA football standings
	Conf.			Overall
Team	W		L	W		L
East Division
Florida Atlantic xy$	7	–	1	11	–	3
Marshall	6	–	2	8	–	5
Western Kentucky	6	–	2	9	–	4
Charlotte	5	–	3	7	–	6
Middle Tennessee	3	–	5	4	–	8
FIU	3	–	5	6	–	7
Old Dominion	0	–	8	1	–	11
West Division
UAB xy	6	–	2	9	–	5
Louisiana Tech x	6	–	2	10	–	3
Southern Miss	5	–	3	7	–	6
North Texas	3	–	5	4	–	8
UTSA	3	–	5	4	–	8
Rice	3	–	5	3	–	9
UTEP	0	–	8	1	–	11
Championship: Florida Atlantic 49, UAB 6
$ – Conference champion; x – Division champion/co-champions; y – Championship game participant

The 2019 North Texas Mean Green football team represented the University of North Texas as a member of Conference USA (C-USA) during the 2019 NCAA Division I FBS football season. Led by fourth-year head coach Seth Littrell, the Mean Green compiled an overall record of 4–8 with a mark 3–5 in conference play, placing in a three-way tie for fourth in C-USA's West Division. The team played home games at Apogee Stadium in Denton, Texas.

== Schedule ==
North Texas announced its 2019 football schedule on January 10, 2019. The schedule consisted of six home games and six away games.

^‡Largest attendance recorded at Apogee Stadium.

Date	Time	Opponent	Site	TV	Result	Attendance
August 31	6:30 p.m.	Abilene Christian*	Apogee Stadium; Denton, TX	ESPN+	W 51–31	23,057
September 7	6:00 p.m.	at SMU*	Gerald J. Ford Stadium; Dallas, TX (Safeway Bowl)	ESPN3	L 27–49	22,766
September 14	3:15 p.m.	at California*	California Memorial Stadium; Berkeley, CA	P12N	L 17–23	35,268
September 21	6:30 p.m.	UTSA	Apogee Stadium; Denton, TX	Stadium on Facebook	W 45–3	19,922
September 28	4:00 p.m.	Houston*	Apogee Stadium; Denton, TX	CBSSN on Facebook	L 25–46	30,123^{‡}
October 12	6:00 p.m.	at Southern Miss	M. M. Roberts Stadium; Hattiesburg, MS	Stadium on Facebook	L 27–45	25,225
October 19	3:00 p.m.	Middle Tennessee	Apogee Stadium; Denton, TX	Stadium	W 33–30	16,094
October 26	2:30 p.m.	at Charlotte	Jerry Richardson Stadium; Charlotte, NC	ESPN+	L 38–39	8,245
November 2	2:30 p.m.	UTEP^{†}	Apogee Stadium; Denton, TX	NFLN	W 52–26	22,548
November 9	3:00 p.m.	at Louisiana Tech	Joe Aillet Stadium; Ruston, LA	Stadium on Facebook	L 17–52	22,792
November 23	2:30 p.m.	at Rice	Rice Stadium; Houston, TX	NFLN	L 14–20	18,477
November 30	3:00 p.m.	UAB	Apogee Stadium; Denton, TX	Stadium	L 21–26	16,406
*Non-conference game; ^{†}Homecoming; All times are in Central time

== Preseason ==
=== Coaching changes ===
Offensive coordinator, Graham Harrell left for USC and be the replacement for Kliff Kingsbury. Graham was "a master of the film" and proponent of the "Air Raid" offense. Eastern Washington offensive coordinator Bodie Reeder join edNorth Texas as offensive coordinator.

=== Recruiting ===
The highest ranked 2019 recruits were listed as three stars: DeShawn Gaddie (cornerback) at 0.8473 (247sports.com), brothers Gabriel & Grayson Murphy (outside linebacker) at 0.8463 (247sports.com) and Khatib Lyles (wide receiver) at 0.8463 (247sports.com). The team had 19 three-star recruits, none of which were listed on ESPN 300. 247Sports, ESPN and Rivals all ranked UNT’s signing class as the best in the conference.

=== CUSA media poll ===
Conference USA released their preseason media poll on July 16, 2019, with the Mean Green predicted to finish in first place in the West Division.

=== Preseason All-Conference USA team ===
North Texas had more offensive players selected than any team in the conference for the preseason all offensive team.

CUSA Offensive Player of the Year
Position	Player	Class
QB	Mason Fine	Sr.

All-CUSA Offense
Position	Player	Class
QB	Mason Fine	Sr.
OL	Sosaia Mose	Sr.
WR	Rico Bussey, Jr.	Sr.

All-CUSA Defense
Position	Player	Class
DL	LaDarius Hamilton	Sr.

All-CUSA Special Teams
Position	Player	Class
P	Alvin Kenworthy	Sr.

== Game summaries ==
=== Abilene Christian ===
	1	2	3	4	Total
Wildcats	0	10	7	14	31
Mean Green	17	21	10	3	51

=== At SMU ===
	1	2	3	4	Total
Mean Green	0	14	6	7	27
Mustangs	21	7	14	7	49

=== At California ===
	1	2	3	4	Total
Mean Green	0	3	7	7	17
Golden Bears	20	0	3	0	23

=== UTSA ===
	1	2	3	4	Total
Roadrunners	0	3	0	0	3
Mean Green	7	17	14	7	45

=== Houston ===
	1	2	3	4	Total
Cougars	14	3	14	15	46
Mean Green	0	6	12	7	25

=== At Southern Miss ===
	1	2	3	4	Total
Mean Green	7	13	0	7	27
Golden Eagles	13	15	10	7	45

=== Middle Tennessee ===
	1	2	3	4	Total
Blue Raiders	3	13	0	14	30
Mean Green	7	10	3	13	33

=== At Charlotte ===
	1	2	3	4	Total
Mean Green	14	7	14	3	38
49ers	0	7	14	18	39

=== UTEP ===
	1	2	3	4	Total
Miners	7	7	6	6	26
Mean Green	21	17	7	7	52

=== At Louisiana Tech ===
	1	2	3	4	Total
Mean Green	3	0	0	14	17
Bulldogs	7	10	14	21	52

=== At Rice ===
	1	2	3	4	Total
Mean Green	0	0	7	7	14
Owls	10	10	0	0	20

=== UAB ===
	1	2	3	4	Total
Blazers	3	14	9	0	26
Mean Green	7	7	7	0	21

== Personnel ==
=== Coaching staff ===
Name	Position(s)
Seth Littrell	Head coach
Bodie Reeder	Offensive coordinator Quarterbacks Coach
Tommy Mainord	Associate head coach Co-offensive coordinator Receivers coach
Troy Reffett	Defensive coordinator Safeties coach
Marty Biagi	Special teams coordinator
Patrick Cobbs	Running backs coach
Clay Jennings	Cornerbacks coach
Chuck Langston	Offensive line coach
Adrian Mayes	Tight ends coach
Galen Scott	Linebackers coach
Marc Yellock	Defensive line coach
Tommy Mangino	Offensive quality control
Chris Petrilli	Defensive quality control
Zack Womack	Strength and conditioning coach
Lucas Lopez	Assistant strength and conditioning coach

=== Roster ===
2019 North Texas Mean Green Football
Quarterback: 2 Austin Aune – (redshirt) freshman (6'2, 207); 3 Will Kuehne – freshman (6'1, 198); 5 Jason Bean – (redshirt) freshman (6'3, 189); 6 Mason Fine – senior (5'11, 190); 10 Cole Johnson – freshman (6'2, 173); 17 Kason Martin – (redshirt) freshman (6'3, 205); Running back: 7 Evan Johnson – junior (5'6, 185); 13 DeAndre Torrey – junior (5'7, 191); 15 Tre Siggers – (redshirt) sophomore (5'8, 200); 21 Nic Smith – (redshirt) junior (5'10, 194); 23 Loren Easly – (redshirt) senior (5'11, 201); 27 Oscar Adaway III – freshman (6'0, 215); 34 Kyleb Howell – (redshirt) junior (6'0, 227); 39 KJ Williams – freshman (5'9, 224); Wide receiver: 1 Jaelon Darden – junior (5'9, 172); 8 Rico Bussey Jr. – senior (6'2, 193); 14 Greg White – (redshirt) sophomore (6'3, 198); 16 Jyaire Shorter – (redshirt) freshman (6'2, 215); 18 Austin Ogunmakin – (redshirt) freshman (6'3, 195); 20 David Chapple – (redshirt) freshman (5'11, 166); 22 Calen Mayfield – (redshirt) freshman (5'10, 166); 24 Roderic Burns – (redshirt) freshman (5'10, 179); 25 Trey Henderson – freshman (5'10, 184); 26 Thomas Clancy – (redshirt) junior (5'11, 199); 30 Dennis Smith – (redshirt) senior (5'9, 173); 32 Michael Lawrence – senior (5'10, 187); 80 Khatib Lyles – freshman (6'2, 216); 81 Kealon Jackson – freshman (5'9, 163); 82 Deion Hair-Griffin – (redshirt) junior (5'10, 170); 83 Damon Ward Jr. – freshman (6'0, 210); 84 Deonte Simpson – freshman (6'0, 186); 87 Devon Langston – (redshirt) freshman (6'0, 188); Placekicker: 30 Mason Reid – freshman (5'11, 178); 47 Ethan Mooney – sophomore (6'0, 211); 49 Zach Williams – (redshirt) sophomore (5'8, 181); Punter: 36 Alvin Kenworthy – (redshirt) senior (6'3, 200); 41 Bernardo Rodriguez – (redshirt) sophomore (5'10, 199)	Tight end: 9 Kelvin Smith – (redshirt) senior (6'2, 254); 40 Edward Bautista – freshman (6'0, 224); 85 Adam Duncan – freshman (6'5, 231); 86 Cole McCrary – (redshirt) freshman (6'2, 230); 88 Jason Pirtle – (redshirt) junior (6'2, 225); 89 Asher Alberding – freshman (6'4, 233); Offensive lineman: 53 Jordan Redfearn – (redshirt) freshman (6'3, 290); 56 Jacob Brammer – (redshirt) sophomore (6'4, 280); 58 Nathaniel Herrera – (redshirt) sophomore (6'2, 298); 60 Sosaia Mose – (redshirt) senior (6'2, 292); 61 Logan Davis – (redshirt) freshman (6'5, 289); 62 D'Andre Plantin – graduate (6'5, 310); 65 Chad Hickson – (redshirt) junior (6'4, 277); 66 Chris Cassidy – freshman (6'4, 281); 68 Daxton Byers – freshman (6'5, 303); 70 Thomas Preston III – senior (6'4, 286); 71 Brian Parish – (redshirt) sophomore (6'4, 270); 72 Manase Mose – (redshirt) sophomore (6'1, 292); 73 Cole Brown – (redshirt) freshman (6'4, 275); 74 Chandler Anthony – (redshirt) junior (6'7, 300); 77 Elex Woodworth – (redshirt) senior (6'4, 296); 78 Daizion Carroll – (redshirt) freshman (6'2, 307); 79 John Brunner – freshman (6'5, 334); Defensive lineman: 2 LaDarius Hamilton – senior (6'3, 260); 34 Bryce English – (redshirt) senior (5'11, 295); 44 Jimmy Walker – freshman (6'3, 231); 52 Darrian McMillan – senior (6'2, 250); 54 Asher Frow – junior (6'4, 245); 91 Dayton LeBlanc – (redshirt) freshman (6'1, 283); 92 Jake Jones – (redshirt) freshman (6'4, 244); 93 Caleb Colvin – (redshirt) junior (6'2, 274); 94 Tuulau Sa'afi – (redshirt) senior (6'3, 300); 96 Bryse Burris – (redshirt) sophomore (6'3, 232); 97 Dion Novil – junior (6'4, 315); 99 Kenneth Dotson – freshman (6'3, 257)	Linebacker: 3 Tim Faison – (redshirt) senior (6'2, 215); 5 Tyreke Davis – junior (5'10 209); 20 William LeMasters – (redshirt) senior (6'2, 223); 23 KD Davis – sophomore (5'11", 214); 25 Chris Thornton – (redshirt) sophomore (6'1, 220); 32 Joe Ozougwu – (redshirt) Junior (6'3, 238); 35 Gabriel Murphy – freshman (6'2, 216); 37 Taylor Jacobs – freshman (6'2, 223); 38 Kevin Wood – freshman (6'0, 205); 40 Mike Linehan – (redshirt) senior (6'2, 234); 41 Jordan Hunt – (redshirt) freshman (6'2, 210); 42 Grayson Murphy – freshman (6'2, 219); 43 Larry Nixon III – (redshirt) freshman (6'0, 234); 48 Jamie King – senior (6'3, 231); 59 Hayden Harrison – (redshirt) junior (6'2, 212); Defensive back: 4 Khairi Muhammad – senior (5'11, 188); 6 Dominique Harrison – graduate (5'11, 195); 9 Nick Harvey – graduate (5'10, 190); 10 Makyle Sanders – junior (6'0, 205); 11 Cam Johnson – junior (5'11, 178); 13 Preston Buchanan – (redshirt) freshman (6'2, 178); 14 Quinn Whitlock – (redshirt) sophomore (6'0, 183); 15 Dorian Morris – freshman (5'10, 167); 16 Jahvon Millard – (redshirt) freshman (5'11, 173); 17 DeShawn Gaddie – freshman (6'1, 181); 19 Leandre Davis – freshman (5'10, 200); 22 Keelan Crosby – freshman (6'1, 177); 24 Taylor Robinson – (redshirt) senior (5'11, 188); 26 Alex Morris – sophomore (6'1, 194); 27 Jevin Murray – freshman (5'11, 193); 31 Jaxon Gibbs – (redshirt) freshman (5'11, 199); 36 BJ Lewis – freshman (5'9, 168); 39 Jameel Moore– senior (5'10, 181); 47 Javier Neal – (redshirt) freshman (5'9, 169); Long snappers: 29 Nate Durham – junior (6'2, 225); 57 Brandon Oldham – freshman (6'2, 220)
Source and player details:
