= 2019 Conference USA Football Championship Game =

2019 Ryan Conference USA Football Championship Game
- Conference Championship
UAB Blazers	Florida Atlantic Owls
(9–3)	(9–3)
6	49
Head coach: Bill Clark	Head coach: Lane Kiffin
	1	2	3	4	Total
UAB	3	3	0	0	6
Florida Atlantic	14	21	7	7	49
- Date: December 7, 2019
- Season: 2019
- Stadium: FAU Stadium
- Location: Boca Raton, FL
- MVP: Deangelo Antoine (WR, Florida Atlantic)
- Favorite: Florida Atlantic by 8
- Referee: Justin Elliott
- Attendance: 14,387

United States TV coverage
- Network: CBSSN
- Announcers: Carter Blackburn (play-by-play), Aaron Taylor (analyst) and John Schriffen (sideline)

2019 Conference USA football standings
	Conf.			Overall
Team	W		L	W		L
East Division
Florida Atlantic xy$	7	–	1	11	–	3
Marshall	6	–	2	8	–	5
Western Kentucky	6	–	2	9	–	4
Charlotte	5	–	3	7	–	6
Middle Tennessee	3	–	5	4	–	8
FIU	3	–	5	6	–	7
Old Dominion	0	–	8	1	–	11
West Division
UAB xy	6	–	2	9	–	5
Louisiana Tech x	6	–	2	10	–	3
Southern Miss	5	–	3	7	–	6
North Texas	3	–	5	4	–	8
UTSA	3	–	5	4	–	8
Rice	3	–	5	3	–	9
UTEP	0	–	8	1	–	11
Championship: Florida Atlantic 49, UAB 6
$ – Conference champion; x – Division champion/co-champions; y – Championship game participant

The 2019 Conference USA Football Championship Game was a college football game played on Saturday, December 7, 2019, at FAU Stadium in Boca Raton, Florida, to determine the 2019 champion of Conference USA (C–USA). The game featured the East division champions Florida Atlantic and the West division champions UAB and was the conference's 15th championship game. With sponsorship from Ryan LLC, a global tax services and software provider, the game was officially the 2019 Ryan Conference USA Football Championship Game.

== Previous season ==
The 2018 Conference USA Football Championship Game featured East Division champion Middle Tennessee against West Division champion UAB in a rematch of the regular season match up a week before. Unlike the week prior, UAB was able to get a final field goal to take the lead, towards the end of the 4th quarter in a win of 27–25.

== Teams ==
The 2019 CUSA Football Championship Game was contested by the Florida Atlantic Owls, East Division champions, and the UAB Blazers, West Division co–champions. The teams have met eight times previously, with Florida Atlantic holding a 6–2 edge in the series. The teams' last meeting came in 2014; UAB won, 31–28. Florida Atlantic's last victory in the series came in 2013, when they defeated UAB 37–3 . This will be the teams' first meeting in the CUSA Football Championship.

=== Florida Atlantic ===
Florida Atlantic clinched its spot in the Championship Game after its November 30 win over Southern Miss. This is Florida Atlantic's second overall appearance in the Championship Game in three seasons. The Owls were previously 1–0 overall in the game, with their sole win back in 2017 against North Texas.

=== UAB ===
UAB earned its spot after clinching the West Division title on November 30 with a win over North Texas. This will be UAB's second appearance in the title game, when they defeated Middle Tennessee last season, 27–25. The Blazers are the first team to represent the West Division twice consecutively since former CUSA member, Tulsa, did back in 2008. Eight different teams had represented the division each year since then. UAB was previously 1–0 overall in the game, with their sole win last season against Middle Tennessee.

== Game summary ==
2019 Conference USA Football Championship Game

Quarter	1	2	3	4	Total
UAB	3	3	0	0	6
Florida Atlantic	14	21	7	7	49

at FAU Stadium • Boca Raton, Florida

- Date: Saturday, December 7, 2019
- Game time: 1:30 p.m. EST
- Game attendance: 14,387
- Referee: Justin Elliott
- TV announcers (CBSSN): Carter Blackburn (play-by-play), Aaron Taylor (analyst), and John Schriffen (sideline)
- ESPN game summary

Game information

First Quarter

- (5:25) FAU – BJ Emmons 1 yard rush, Vladimir Rivas kick (Drive: 10 plays, 51 yards, 3:41; Florida Atlantic 7–0)
- (1:45) UAB – Nick Vogel 44 yard field goal (Drive: 8 plays, 51 yards, 3:40; Florida Atlantic 7–3)
- (1:32) FAU – Chris Robison 75 yard pass to Deangelo Antoine, Vladimir Rivas kick (Drive: 1 play, 75 yards, 0:13; Florida Atlantic 14–3)

Second Quarter

- (14:09) FAU – Chris Robison 18 yard pass to John Mitchell, Vladimir Rivas kick (Drive: 6 plays, 69 yards, 1:27; Florida Atlantic 21–3)
- (6:46) FAU – Eddie Williams 7 yard punt block return, Vladimir Rivas kick (Florida Atlantic 28–3)
- (4:59) UAB – Nick Vogel 36 yard field goal (Drive: 6 plays, 57 yards, 1:47; Florida Atlantic 28–6)
- (0:26) FAU – Chris Robison 8 yard pass to Harrison Bryant, Vladimir Rivas kick (Drive: 8 plays, 51 yards, 1:16; Florida Atlantic 35–6)

Third Quarter

- (3:57) FAU – BJ Emmons 1 yard rush, Vladimir Rivas kick (Drive: 10 plays, 72 yards, 2:36; Florida Atlantic 42–6)

Fourth Quarter

- (9:51) FAU – Chris Robison 20 yard pass to Chauncey Mason, Vladimir Rivas kick (Drive: 8 plays, 80 yards, 3:28; Florida Atlantic 49–6)

=== Statistics ===
Statistics	UAB	FAU
First downs	14	29
Plays–yards	59–223	81–585
Rushes–yards	40–139	42–286
Passing yards	84	299
Passing: comp–att–int	8–19–2	18–39–1
Time of possession	31:05	28:55

Team	Category	Player	Statistics
UAB	Passing	Dylan Hopkins	4/7, 42 yards, 1 INT
UAB	Rushing	Spencer Brown	18 carries, 65 yards
UAB	Receiving	Austin Watkins	3 receptions, 43 yards
Florida Atlantic	Passing	Chris Robison	17/37, 267 yards, 4 TD, 1 INT
Florida Atlantic	Rushing	Malcolm Davidson	11 carries, 128 yards,
Florida Atlantic	Receiving	Deangelo Antoine	5 receptions, 112 yards, 1 TD

== See also ==
- List of Conference USA football champions
