= 2019 UTEP Miners football team =

American college football season

2019 UTEP Miners football
- Conference: Conference USA
- West Division
- Record: 1–11 (0–8 C-USA)
- Head coach: Dana Dimel (2nd season)
- Offensive coordinator: Mike Canales (2nd season)
- Offensive scheme: Pro-style
- Defensive coordinator: Mike Cox (2nd season)
- Base defense: 4–3
- Home stadium: Sun Bowl Stadium

2019 Conference USA football standings
	Conf.			Overall
Team	W		L	W		L
East Division
Florida Atlantic xy$	7	–	1	11	–	3
Marshall	6	–	2	8	–	5
Western Kentucky	6	–	2	9	–	4
Charlotte	5	–	3	7	–	6
Middle Tennessee	3	–	5	4	–	8
FIU	3	–	5	6	–	7
Old Dominion	0	–	8	1	–	11
West Division
UAB xy	6	–	2	9	–	5
Louisiana Tech x	6	–	2	10	–	3
Southern Miss	5	–	3	7	–	6
North Texas	3	–	5	4	–	8
UTSA	3	–	5	4	–	8
Rice	3	–	5	3	–	9
UTEP	0	–	8	1	–	11
Championship: Florida Atlantic 49, UAB 6
$ – Conference champion; x – Division champion/co-champions; y – Championship game participant

The 2019 UTEP Miners football team represented the University of Texas at El Paso (UTEP) as a member of the West Division in Conference USA (C-USA) during the 2019 NCAA Division I FCS football season. Led by second-year head coach Dana Dimel, the Miners compiled an overall record of 1–11 with a mark of 0–8 in conference play, placing seventh at the bottom of the standings in C-USA's West Division. The team played home games at the Sun Bowl in El Paso, Texas.

UTEP averaged 17,093 fans per game.

== Schedule ==
UTEP announced its 2019 football schedule on January 10, 2019. The 2019 schedule consisted of six home and six away games.

Date	Time	Opponent	Site	TV	Result	Attendance
August 31	6:00 p.m.	Houston Baptist*	Sun Bowl; El Paso, TX	ESPN+	W 36–34	34,646
September 7	6:00 p.m.	at Texas Tech*	Jones AT&T Stadium; Lubbock, TX	FSN	L 3–38	56,957
September 21	6:00 p.m.	Nevada*	Sun Bowl; El Paso, TX	ESPN3	L 21–37	10,493
September 28	5:00 p.m.	at Southern Miss	M. M. Roberts Stadium; Hattiesburg, MS	ESPN+	L 13–31	23,337
October 5	6:00 p.m.	UTSA^{†}	Sun Bowl; El Paso, TX	ESPN+	L 16–26	13,876
October 19	5:00 p.m.	at FIU	Riccardo Silva Stadium; Miami, FL	ESPN+	L 17–32	13,951
October 26	6:00 p.m.	Louisiana Tech	Sun Bowl; El Paso, TX	ESPN3	L 21–42	16,084
November 2	1:30 p.m.	at North Texas	Apogee Stadium; Denton, TX	NFLN	L 26–52	22,548
November 9	1:00 p.m.	Charlotte	Sun Bowl; El Paso, TX	ESPN+	L 21–28	15,683
November 16	11:00 a.m.	at UAB	Legion Field; Birmingham, AL	ESPN3	L 10–37	19,875
November 23	2:00 p.m.	at New Mexico State*	Aggie Memorial Stadium; Las Cruces, NM (Battle of I-10)	FloSports, FSNAZ+	L 35–44	21,584
November 30	1:00 p.m.	Rice	Sun Bowl; El Paso, TX	ESPN3	L 16–30	11,776
*Non-conference game; ^{†}Homecoming; All times are in Mountain time

== Preseason ==
=== C-USA media poll ===
Conference USA released its preseason media poll on July 16, 2019, with the Miners predicted to finish last in the West Division.

=== Preseason All–Conference USA teams ===
2019 Preseason All–Conference USA

All–CUSA Offense
Position	Player	Class
OL	Derron Gatewood	Sr.

All–CUSA Defense
Position	Player	Class
No players were selected

All–CUSA Special Teams
Position	Player	Class
No players were selected

== Game summaries ==
=== Houston Baptist ===
Houston Baptist at UTEP

Team	1	2	3	4	Total
Huskies (Div. I FCS)	0	17	11	6	34
• Miners	3	17	13	3	36

- Date: August 31, 2019
- Location: Sun Bowl
  El Paso, TX
- Game start: 6:05 p.m. MDT
- Elapsed time: 3 hours and 9 minutes
- Game attendance: 34,646
- Game weather: N/A
- Referee: Justin Elliott
- TV announcers (ESPN+): Andy Morgan and Trevor Vittatoe

Scoring summary
1	08:26	UTEP	Gavin Baechle 30–yard field goal	UTEP 3–0
2	12:57	UTEP	Tre'shon Wolf 80–yard pass from Brandon Jones (Gavin Baechle kick)	UTEP 10–0
2	08:18	HBU	Trevor Larkin 4–yard pass from Bailey Zappe (Gino Garcia kick)	UTEP 10–7
2	06:46	HBU	Caleb Johnson 26–yard interception (Gino Garcia kick)	HBU 14–10
2	02:52	UTEP	Treyvon Hughes 3–yard run (Gavin Baechle kick)	UTEP 17–14
2	01:14	HBU	Gino Garcia 47–yard field goal	TIE 17–17
2	00:00	UTEP	Gavin Baechle 21–yard field goal	UTEP 20–17
3	13:00	HBU	Ben Ratzlaff 16–yard pass from Bailey Zappe (Gino Garcia kick failed)	HBU 23–20
3	12:18	HBU	Team 15–yard safety	HBU 25–20
3	09:17	HBU	Gino Garcia 23–yard field goal	HBU 28–20
3	05:19	UTEP	Brandon Jones 3–yard run (pass intercepted)	HBU 28–26
3	00:00	UTEP	Treyvon Hughes 19–yard run (Gavin Baechle kick)	UTEP 33–28
4	12:59	HBU	Ean Beek 3–yard run (Bailey Zappe pass failed)	HBU 34–33
4	08:15	UTEP	Gavin Baechle 35–yard field goal	UTEP 36–34

=== At Texas Tech ===
UTEP at Texas Tech

Team	1	2	3	4	Total
Miners	0	0	0	3	3
• Red Raiders	7	14	10	7	38

- Date: September 7, 2019
- Location: Jones AT&T Stadium
  Lubbock, TX
- Game start: 7:07 p.m. MDT
- Elapsed time: 3 hours and 13 minutes
- Game attendance: 56,957
- Game weather: Temperature: 92 °F (33 °C) • Weather: Clear • Wind: S 12 MPH
- Referee: Jonathan Noli
- TV announcers (FSN): Mark Followill, Brian Baldinger and C.T. Steckel (sideline)

Scoring summary
1	11:14	TTU	Ta'Zhawn Henry 5–yard run (Trey Wolff kick)	TTU 7–0
2	10:41	TTU	T. J. Vasher 13–yard pass from Alan Bowman (Trey Wolff kick)	TTU 14–0
2	01:35	TTU	Dalton Rigdon 49–yard pass from Alan Bowman (Trey Wolff kick)	TTU 21–0
3	11:26	TTU	Trey Wolff 45–yard field goal	TTU 24–0
3	02:45	TTU	T.J. Vasher 30–yard pass from Alan Bowman (Trey Wolff kick)	TTU 31–0
4	12:51	TTU	Armand Shyne 7–yard run (Trey Wolff kick)	TTU 38–0
4	05:32	UTEP	Gavin Baechle 45–yard field goal	TTU 38–3

=== Nevada ===
Nevada at UTEP

Team	1	2	3	4	Total
• Wolf Pack	0	21	3	13	37
Miners	7	7	7	0	21

- Date: September 21, 2019
- Location: Sun Bowl
  El Paso, TX
- Game start: 6:05 p.m. MDT
- Elapsed time: 2 hours and 55 minutes
- Game attendance: 10,493
- Game weather: Temperature: 70 °F (21 °C) • Weather: Cloudy • Wind: SSE 7 MPH
- Referee: Rodney Burnette
- TV announcers (ESPN3): Andy Morgan and Trevor Vittatoe

Scoring summary
1	08:10	UTEP	Treyvon Hughes 4–yard run (Gavin Baechle kick)	UTEP 7–0
2	14:56	NEV	Toa Taua 5–yard run (Brandon Talton kick)	TIE 7–7
2	06:49	UTEP	Treyvon Hughes 6–yard run (Gavin Baechle kick)	UTEP 14–7
2	03:02	NEV	Elijah Cooks 28–yard pass from Cristian Solano (Brandon Talton kick)	TIE 14–14
2	02:23	NEV	Elijah Cooks 20–yard pass from Cristian Solano (Brandon Talton kick)	NEV 21–14
3	05:01	UTEP	Kai Locksley 1–yard run (Gavin Baechle kick)	TIE 21–21
3	01:49	NEV	Brandon Talton 27–yard field goal	NEV 24–21
4	13:22	NEV	Kelton Moore 5–yard run (Brandon Talton kick blocked)	NEV 30–21
4	04:08	NEV	Kelton Moore 1–yard run (Brandon Talton kick)	NEV 37–21

=== At Southern Miss ===
UTEP at Southern Miss

Team	1	2	3	4	Total
Miners	0	6	7	0	13
• Golden Eagles	14	10	7	0	31

- Date: September 28, 2019
- Location: M. M. Roberts Stadium
  Hattiesburg, MS
- Game start: 6:05 p.m. CDT
- Elapsed time: 3 hours and 10 minutes
- Game attendance: 23,337
- Game weather: Temperature: 87 °F (31 °C) • Weather: Clear and 36% Humidity • Wind: SE 7 MPH
- Referee: Jonathan Noli
- TV announcers (ESPN+): Jason Baker and Marchant Kenney

Scoring summary
1	11:35	USM	De'Michael Harris 74–yard pass from Jack Abraham (Andrew Stein kick)	USM 7–0
1	09:31	USM	De'Michael Harris 2–yard run (Andrew Stein kick)	USM 14–0
2	14:02	UTEP	Gavin Baechle 28–yard field goal	USM 14–3
2	03:07	USM	Jordan Mitchell 22–yard pass from Jack Abraham (Andrew Stein kick)	USM 21–3
2	00:16	UTEP	Gavin Baechle 46–yard field goal	USM 21–6
2	00:00	USM	Andrew Stein 38–yard field goal	USM 24–6
3	13:55	UTEP	Kai Locksley 63–yard run (Gavin Baechle kick)	USM 24–13
3	08:35	USM	Jaylond Adams 6–yard pass from Jack Abraham (Andrew Stein kick)	USM 31–13

=== UTSA ===
UTSA at UTEP

Team	1	2	3	4	Total
• Roadrunners	7	3	6	10	26
Miners	0	3	7	6	16

- Date: October 5, 2019
- Location: Sun Bowl
  El Paso, TX
- Game start: 6:05 p.m. MDT
- Elapsed time: 3 hours and 6 minutes
- Game attendance: 13,876
- Game weather: Temperature: 85 °F (29 °C) • Weather: Sunny • Wind: WSW 10 MPH
- Referee: Justin Elliott
- TV announcers (ESPN+): Andy Morgan and Trevor Vittatoe

Scoring summary
1	10:17	UTSA	Lowell Narcisse 9–yard run (Hunter Duplessis kick)	UTSA 7–0
2	09:44	UTSA	Hunter Duplessis 23–yard field goal	UTSA 10–0
2	00:00	UTEP	Gavin Baechle 37–yard field goal	UTSA 10–3
3	11:22	UTSA	Blaze Moorhead 18–yard pass from Lowell Narcisse (Lucas Dean pass failed)	UTSA 16–3
3	01:26	UTEP	Treyvon Hughes 8–yard run (Gavin Baechle kick)	UTSA 16–10
4	11:38	UTSA	Hunter Duplessis 43–yard field goal	UTSA 19–10
4	04:02	UTSA	Sincere McCormick 51–yard run (Hunter Duplessis kick)	UTSA 26–10
4	00:44	UTEP	Tre'shon Wolf 2–yard pass from Brandon Jones (pass failed)	UTSA 26–16

=== At FIU ===
UTEP at FIU

Team	1	2	3	4	Total
Miners	7	0	0	10	17
• Panthers	3	15	0	14	32

- Date: October 19, 2019
- Location: Riccardo Silva Stadium
  Miami, FL
- Game start: 7:00 p.m. EDT
- Elapsed time: 3 hours and 1 minute
- Game attendance: 13,951
- Game weather: Temperature: 83 °F (28 °C) • Weather: Mostly Cloudy • Wind: S 12 MPH
- Referee: Jonathan Noli
- TV announcers (ESPN+): A.J. Ricketts and Kenny Kelly

Scoring summary
1	12:24	FIU	José Borregales 32–yard field goal	FIU 3–0
1	05:06	UTEP	Treyvon Hughes 1–yard run (Gavin Baechle kick)	UTEP 7–3
2	14:27	FIU	Shemar Thornton 9–yard pass from James Morgan (Jose Borregales kick)	FIU 10–7
2	14:09	FIU	Team 10–yard safety	FIU 12–7
2	10:19	FIU	Jose Borregales 34–yard field goal	FIU 15–7
2	04:48	FIU	Jose Borregales 46–yard field goal	FIU 18–7
4	14:21	FIU	Anthony Jones 3–yard run (Jose Borregales kick)	FIU 25–7
4	06:57	UTEP	Gavin Baechle 23–yard field goal	FIU 25–10
4	03:43	FIU	Napoleon Maxwell 10–yard run (Jose Borregales kick)	FIU 32–10
4	02:06	UTEP	Jacob Cowing 34–yard pass from Kai Locksley (Gavin Baechle kick)	FIU 32–17

=== Louisiana Tech ===
Louisiana Tech at UTEP

Team	1	2	3	4	Total
• Bulldogs	7	21	14	0	42
Miners	7	0	0	14	21

- Date: October 26, 2019
- Location: Sun Bowl
  El Paso, TX
- Game start: 6:00 p.m. MDT
- Elapsed time: 3 hours and 14 minutes
- Game attendance: 16,084
- Game weather: Temperature: 59 °F (15 °C) • Weather: Clear • Wind: SSW 8 MPH
- Referee: Chris Bynum
- TV announcers (ESPN+): Andy Morgan and Trevor Vittatoe

Scoring summary
1	07:41	LATECH	Israel Tucker 1–yard run (Bailey Hale kick)	LATECH 7–0
1	01:35	UTEP	Treyvon Hughes 5–yard run (Gavin Baechle kick)	TIE 7–7
2	09:45	LATECH	Malik Stanley 9–yard pass from J'Mar Smith (Bailey Hale kick)	LATECH 14–7
2	06:27	LATECH	Griffin Hebert 23–yard pass from J'Mar Smith (Bailey Hale kick)	LATECH 21–7
2	00:27	LATECH	Justin Henderson 3–yard run (Bailey Hale kick)	LATECH 28–7
3	05:58	LATECH	Bobby Holly 5–yard pass from J'Mar Smith (Bailey Hale kick)	LATECH 35–7
3	02:07	LATECH	Justin Henderson 1–yard run (Bailey Hale kick)	LATECH 42–7
4	09:49	UTEP	Kai Locksley 1–yard run (Gavin Baechle kick)	LATECH 42–14
4	02:51	UTEP	Jacob Cowing 54–yard pass from Kai Locksley (Gavin Baechle kick)	LATECH 42–21

=== At North Texas ===
UTEP at North Texas

Team	1	2	3	4	Total
Miners	7	7	6	6	26
• Mean Green	21	17	7	7	52

- Date: November 2, 2019
- Location: Apogee Stadium
  Denton, TX
- Game start: 2:33 p.m. CDT
- Elapsed time: 3 hours and 25 minutes
- Game attendance: 22,548
- Game weather: Temperature: 61 °F (16 °C) • Weather: Clear • Wind: NE 11 MPH
- Referee: Joe Lehring
- TV announcers (NFLN): Dave Ryan, Ben Leber and Ashley Stroehlein (sideline)

Scoring summary
1	14:43	UNT	Deonte Simpson 33–yard pass from Mason Fine (Ethan Mooney kick)	UNT 7–0
1	14:31	UNT	Jason Pirtle 17–yard pass from Mason Fine (Ethan Mooney kick)	UNT 14–0
1	08:45	UTEP	Treyvon Hughes 1–yard run (Gavin Baechle kick)	UNT 14–7
1	04:17	UNT	Jyaire Shorter 48–yard pass from Mason Fine (Ethan Mooney kick)	UNT 21–7
2	14:44	UNT	Ethan Mooney 44–yard field goal	UNT 24–7
2	14:33	UTEP	Duron Lowe 100–yard kickoff return (Gavin Baechle kick)	UNT 24–14
2	11:28	UNT	Jaelon Darden 6–yard pass from Mason Fine (Ethan Mooney kick)	UNT 31–14
2	04:28	UNT	Jaelon Darden 6–yard pass from Mason Fine (Ethan Mooney kick)	UNT 38–14
3	01:26	UTEP	Treyvon Hughes 42–yard run (Kai Locksley pass failed)	UNT 38–20
3	00:46	UNT	Jaelon Darden 14–yard pass from Mason Fine (Ethan Mooney kick)	UNT 45–20
4	09:17	UNT	Deonte Simpson 20–yard pass from Mason Fine (Ethan Mooney kick)	UNT 52–20
4	03:16	UTEP	Treyvon Hughes 3–yard run (Kai Locksley pass failed)	UNT 52–26

=== Charlotte ===
Charlotte at UTEP

Team	1	2	3	4	Total
• 49ers	0	7	14	7	28
Miners	14	7	0	0	21

- Date: November 9, 2019
- Location: Sun Bowl
  El Paso, TX
- Game start: 1:00 p.m. MST
- Elapsed time: 3 hours and 15 minutes
- Game attendance: 15,683
- Game weather: Temperature: 70 °F (21 °C) • Weather: Mostly Sunny • Wind: N/A
- Referee: Billy Williams
- TV announcers (ESPN+): Andy Morgan and Trevor Vittatoe

Scoring summary
1	09:21	UTEP	Kai Locksley 19–yard run (Gavin Baechle kick)	UTEP 7–0
1	01:52	UTEP	Justin Garrett 15–yard pass from Kai Locksley (Gavin Baechle kick)	UTEP 14–0
2	10:57	CLT	Tyler Ringwood 16–yard pass from Chris Reynolds (Jonathan Cruz kick)	UTEP 14–7
2	00:42	UTEP	Treyvon Hughes 3–yard run (Gavin Baechle kick)	UTEP 21–7
3	11:50	CLT	Jonathan Cruz 45–yard field goal	UTEP 21–10
3	04:48	CLT	Ishod Finger 3–yard run (Christian Roberson pass)	UTEP 21–18
3	00:44	CLT	Jonathan Cruz 34–yard field goal	TIE 21–21
4	07:06	CLT	Jacob Hunt 19–yard pass from Chris Reynolds (Jonathan Cruz kick)	CLT 28–21

=== At UAB ===
UTEP at UAB

Team	1	2	3	4	Total
Miners	0	7	0	3	10
• Blazers	17	6	7	7	37

- Date: November 16, 2019
- Location: Legion Field
  Birmingham, AL
- Game start: 12:00 p.m. CST
- Elapsed time: 3 hours and 22 minutes
- Game attendance: 19,875
- Game weather: N/A
- Referee: Joe Lehring
- TV announcers (ESPN3): Curt Bloom and Chad Pilcher

Scoring summary
1	05:42	UAB	Dylan Hopkins 2–yard run (Nick Vogel kick)	UAB 7–0
1	01:54	UAB	Nick Vogel 35–yard field goal	UAB 10–0
1	01:10	UAB	Spencer Brown 4–yard run (Nick Vogel kick)	UAB 17–0
2	03:38	UAB	Nick Vogel 36–yard field goal	UAB 20–0
2	00:44	UAB	Nick Vogel 27–yard field goal	UAB 23–0
2	00:07	UTEP	Alan Busey 8–yard pass from Gavin Hardison (Gavin Baechle kick)	UAB 23–7
3	03:43	UAB	Jermaine Brown Jr. 6–yard run (Nick Vogel kick)	UAB 30–7
4	14:10	UTEP	Gavin Baechle 41–yard field goal	UAB 30–10
4	05:47	UAB	Myron Mitchell 40–yard pass from Dylan Hopkins (Nick Vogel kick)	UAB 37–10

=== At New Mexico State ===
UTEP at New Mexico State
(Battle of I-10)

Team	1	2	3	4	Total
Miners	0	13	3	19	35
• Aggies	7	7	7	23	44

- Date: November 23, 2019
- Location: Aggie Memorial Stadium
  Las Cruces, NM
- Game start: 2:07 p.m. MST
- Elapsed time: 3 hours and 23 minutes
- Game attendance: 21,584
- Game weather: Temperature: 57 °F (14 °C) • Weather: Clear Skies • Wind: NNW 4 MPH
- Referee: Ken Antee
- TV announcers (FloSports/FSNAZ+): Adam Young and Danny Knee

Scoring summary
1	09:00	NMSU	Jason Huntley 39–yard run (Dylan Brown kick)	NMSU 7–0
2	12:36	UTEP	Treyvon Hughes 11–yard run (Gavin Baechle kick)	TIE 7–7
2	04:36	UTEP	Gavin Baechle 34–yard field goal	UTEP 10–7
2	01:29	UTEP	Gavin Baechle 21–yard field goal	UTEP 13–7
2	00:55	NMSU	Jason Huntley 53–yard run (Dylan Brown kick)	NMSU 14–13
3	04:01	UTEP	Gavin Baechle 42–yard field goal	UTEP 16–14
3	02:00	NMSU	Jason Huntley 7–yard run (Dylan Brown kick)	NMSU 21–16
4	14:55	UTEP	Jacob Cowing 23–yard pass from Kai Locksley (pass failed)	UTEP 22–21
4	11:57	NMSU	Josh Adkins 7–yard pass from Tony Nicholson (Josh Adkins pass failed)	NMSU 27–22
4	06:20	NMSU	Dylan Brown 53–yard field goal	NMSU 30–22
4	05:30	NMSU	Matthew Young 19–yard fumble recovery (Dylan Brown kick)	NMSU 37–22
4	04:27	UTEP	Kai Locksley 1–yard run (Gavin Baechle kick)	NMSU 37–29
4	02:39	NMSU	Christian Gibson 53–yard run (Dylan Brown kick)	NMSU 44–29
4	00:00	UTEP	Justin Garrett 10–yard pass from Kai Locksley	NMSU 44–35

=== Rice ===
Rice at UTEP

Team	1	2	3	4	Total
• Owls	14	0	10	6	30
Miners	6	10	0	0	16

- Date: November 30, 2019
- Location: Sun Bowl
  El Paso, TX
- Game start: 1:00 p.m. MST
- Elapsed time: 3 hours and 9 minutes
- Game attendance: 11,776
- Game weather: Temperature: 55 °F (13 °C) • Weather: Sunny • Wind: Windy
- Referee: Chris Bynum
- TV announcers (ESPN3): Andy Morgan and Trevor Vittatoe

Scoring summary
1	11:48	RICE	Austin Trammell 3–yard pass from Tom Stewart (Chris Barnes kick)	RICE 7–0
1	03:07	UTEP	Praise Amaewhule 0–yard fumble recovery (Brady Viles kick failed)	RICE 7–6
1	00:02	RICE	Aston Walter 30–yard run (Chris Barnes kick)	RICE 14–6
2	11:38	UTEP	Justin Garrett 12–yard pass from Kai Locksley (Gavin Baechle kick)	RICE 14–13
2	00:00	UTEP	Gavin Baechle 45–yard field goal	UTEP 16–14
3	07:16	RICE	Chris Barnes 21–yard field goal	RICE 17–16
3	02:44	RICE	JoVoni Johnson 8–yard run (Chris Barnes kick)	RICE 24–16
4	04:27	RICE	JoVoni Johnson 11–yard run (Chris Barnes kick blocked)	RICE 30–16
