= 2019 Florida Atlantic Owls football team =

American college football season

2019 Florida Atlantic Owls football

C-USA champion C-USA East Division champion Boca Raton Bowl champion

C-USA Championship Game, W 49–6 vs. UAB

Boca Raton Bowl, W 52–28 vs. SMU
- Conference: Conference USA
- East Division
- Record: 11–3 (7–1 C-USA)
- Head coach: Lane Kiffin (3rd season; regular season and conference championship); Glenn Spencer (interim; bowl game)
- Offensive coordinator: Charlie Weis Jr. (2nd season)
- Offensive scheme: Veer and shoot
- Defensive coordinator: Glenn Spencer (1st season)
- Base defense: 4–3
- Home stadium: FAU Stadium

2019 Conference USA football standings
| | Conf. | | | Overall |
| Team | W | | L | W | | L |
|---|---|---|---|---|---|---|
East Division
| Florida Atlantic xy$ | 7 | – | 1 | 11 | – | 3 |
| Marshall | 6 | – | 2 | 8 | – | 5 |
| Western Kentucky | 6 | – | 2 | 9 | – | 4 |
| Charlotte | 5 | – | 3 | 7 | – | 6 |
| Middle Tennessee | 3 | – | 5 | 4 | – | 8 |
| FIU | 3 | – | 5 | 6 | – | 7 |
| Old Dominion | 0 | – | 8 | 1 | – | 11 |
West Division
| UAB xy | 6 | – | 2 | 9 | – | 5 |
| Louisiana Tech x | 6 | – | 2 | 10 | – | 3 |
| Southern Miss | 5 | – | 3 | 7 | – | 6 |
| North Texas | 3 | – | 5 | 4 | – | 8 |
| UTSA | 3 | – | 5 | 4 | – | 8 |
| Rice | 3 | – | 5 | 3 | – | 9 |
| UTEP | 0 | – | 8 | 1 | – | 11 |
Championship: Florida Atlantic 49, UAB 6
$ – Conference champion; x – Division champion/co-champions; y – Championship game participant

The 2019 Florida Atlantic Owls football team represented Florida Atlantic University in the 2019 NCAA Division I FBS football season. The Owls played their home games at FAU Stadium in Boca Raton, Florida, and competed in the East Division of Conference USA (CUSA). They were led by head coach Lane Kiffin, and interim head coach Glenn Spencer for their bowl game.

== Preseason ==
=== CUSA media poll ===
Conference USA released their preseason media poll on July 16, 2019, with the Owls predicted to finish in third place in the East Division.

== Schedule ==
Florida Atlantic announced its 2019 football schedule on January 10, 2019. The 2019 schedule consisted of 6 home and away games in the regular season.

| Date | Time | Opponent | Site | TV | Result | Attendance |
|---|---|---|---|---|---|---|
| August 31 | 12:00 p.m. | at No. 5 Ohio State* | Ohio Stadium; Columbus, OH | FOX | L 21–45 | 103,228 |
| September 7 | 7:00 p.m. | No. 18 UCF* | FAU Stadium; Boca Raton, FL | CBSSN | L 14–48 | 30,811 |
| September 14 | 2:00 p.m. | at Ball State* | Scheumann Stadium; Muncie, IN | ESPN+ | W 41–31 | 14,333 |
| September 21 | 6:00 p.m. | Wagner* | FAU Stadium; Boca Raton, FL | ESPN+ | W 42–7 | 14,210 |
| September 28 | 3:30 p.m. | at Charlotte | Jerry Richardson Stadium; Charlotte, NC | NFLN | W 45–27 | 12,334 |
| October 12 | 4:00 p.m. | Middle Tennessee | FAU Stadium; Boca Raton, FL | ESPN+ | W 28–13 | 12,107 |
| October 18 | 6:30 p.m. | Marshall^{†} | FAU Stadium; Boca Raton, FL | CBSSN | L 31–36 | 15,138 |
| October 26 | 3:30 p.m. | at Old Dominion | S.B. Ballard Stadium; Norfolk, VA | ESPN+ | W 41–3 | 17,744 |
| November 2 | 4:00 p.m. | at Western Kentucky | Houchens Industries–L. T. Smith Stadium; Bowling Green, KY | ESPN+ | W 35–24 | 14,212 |
| November 9 | 6:00 p.m. | FIU | FAU Stadium; Boca Raton, FL (Shula Bowl) | Stadium | W 37–7 | 17,603 |
| November 23 | 6:00 p.m. | at UTSA | Alamodome; San Antonio, TX | ESPN+ | W 40–26 | 14,335 |
| November 30 | 3:30 p.m. | Southern Miss | FAU Stadium; Boca Raton, FL | NFLN | W 34–17 | 13,414 |
| December 7 | 1:30 p.m. | UAB | FAU Stadium; Boca Raton, FL (C-USA Championship Game) | CBSSN | W 49–6 | 14,387 |
| December 21 | 3:30 p.m. | SMU* | FAU Stadium; Boca Raton, FL (Boca Raton Bowl) | ABC | W 52–28 | 23,187 |
*Non-conference game; ^{†}Homecoming; Rankings from AP Poll and CFP Rankings after November 5 released prior to game; All times are in Eastern time

Schedule source:

== Game summaries ==
=== At Ohio State ===
| | 1 | 2 | 3 | 4 | Total |
|---|---|---|---|---|---|
| Owls | 0 | 3 | 3 | 15 | 21 |
| No. 5 Buckeyes | 28 | 0 | 7 | 10 | 45 |

=== UCF ===
| | 1 | 2 | 3 | 4 | Total |
|---|---|---|---|---|---|
| No. 18 Knights | 14 | 14 | 13 | 7 | 48 |
| Owls | 0 | 6 | 0 | 8 | 14 |

=== At Ball State ===
| | 1 | 2 | 3 | 4 | Total |
|---|---|---|---|---|---|
| Owls | 7 | 14 | 13 | 7 | 41 |
| Cardinals | 14 | 3 | 7 | 7 | 31 |

=== Wagner ===
| | 1 | 2 | 3 | 4 | Total |
|---|---|---|---|---|---|
| Seahawks | 0 | 7 | 0 | 0 | 7 |
| Owls | 14 | 14 | 7 | 7 | 42 |

=== At Charlotte ===
| | 1 | 2 | 3 | 4 | Total |
|---|---|---|---|---|---|
| Owls | 14 | 10 | 14 | 7 | 45 |
| 49ers | 7 | 7 | 7 | 6 | 27 |

=== Middle Tennessee ===
| | 1 | 2 | 3 | 4 | Total |
|---|---|---|---|---|---|
| Blue Raiders | 6 | 7 | 0 | 0 | 13 |
| Owls | 2 | 10 | 10 | 6 | 28 |

=== Marshall ===
| | 1 | 2 | 3 | 4 | Total |
|---|---|---|---|---|---|
| Thundering Herd | 10 | 7 | 5 | 14 | 36 |
| Owls | 14 | 3 | 0 | 14 | 31 |

=== At Old Dominion ===
| | 1 | 2 | 3 | 4 | Total |
|---|---|---|---|---|---|
| Owls | 14 | 10 | 7 | 10 | 41 |
| Monarchs | 0 | 3 | 0 | 0 | 3 |

=== At Western Kentucky ===
| | 1 | 2 | 3 | 4 | Total |
|---|---|---|---|---|---|
| Owls | 0 | 21 | 7 | 7 | 35 |
| Hilltoppers | 14 | 0 | 7 | 3 | 24 |

=== FIU ===
| | 1 | 2 | 3 | 4 | Total |
|---|---|---|---|---|---|
| Panthers | 0 | 7 | 0 | 0 | 7 |
| Owls | 7 | 6 | 15 | 9 | 37 |

=== At UTSA ===
| | 1 | 2 | 3 | 4 | Total |
|---|---|---|---|---|---|
| Owls | 7 | 10 | 16 | 7 | 40 |
| Roadrunners | 3 | 0 | 8 | 15 | 26 |

=== Southern Miss ===
| | 1 | 2 | 3 | 4 | Total |
|---|---|---|---|---|---|
| Golden Eagles | 0 | 10 | 7 | 0 | 17 |
| Owls | 10 | 7 | 7 | 10 | 34 |

=== UAB (C-USA Championship Game) ===
| | 1 | 2 | 3 | 4 | Total |
|---|---|---|---|---|---|
| Blazers | 3 | 3 | 0 | 0 | 6 |
| Owls | 14 | 21 | 7 | 7 | 49 |

=== SMU (Boca Raton Bowl) ===
| | 1 | 2 | 3 | 4 | Total |
|---|---|---|---|---|---|
| Mustangs | 0 | 14 | 0 | 14 | 28 |
| Owls | 7 | 21 | 14 | 10 | 52 |

== Rankings ==
Ranking movements Legend: ██ Increase in ranking ██ Decrease in ranking — = Not ranked RV = Received votes
| | Week | | | | | | | | | | | | | | | | |
| Poll | Pre | 1 | 2 | 3 | 4 | 5 | 6 | 7 | 8 | 9 | 10 | 11 | 12 | 13 | 14 | 15 | Final |
|---|---|---|---|---|---|---|---|---|---|---|---|---|---|---|---|---|---|
| AP | — | — | — | — | — | — | — | — | — | — | — | — | — | — | — | RV | RV |
| Coaches | — | — | — | — | — | — | — | — | — | — | — | — | — | — | — | RV | RV |
| CFP | Not released | | | | | | | | | | — | — | — | — | — | — | Not released |

== Players drafted into the NFL ==
| Round | Pick | Player | Position | NFL Club |
|---|---|---|---|---|
| 4 | 115 | Harrison Bryant | TE | Cleveland Browns |
