= 2019 UAB Blazers football team =

American college football season

2019 UAB Blazers football

C-USA West Division co-champion

C-USA Championship Game, L 6–49 vs. Florida Atlantic

New Orleans Bowl, L 17–31 vs. Appalachian State
- Conference: Conference USA
- West Division
- Record: 9–5 (6–2 C-USA)
- Head coach: Bill Clark (4th season)
- Offensive coordinator: Bryant Vincent (3rd season)
- Offensive scheme: Spread option
- Defensive coordinator: David Reeves (3rd season)
- Base defense: 3–3–5
- Home stadium: Legion Field

2019 Conference USA football standings
	Conf.			Overall
Team	W		L	W		L
East Division
Florida Atlantic xy$	7	–	1	11	–	3
Marshall	6	–	2	8	–	5
Western Kentucky	6	–	2	9	–	4
Charlotte	5	–	3	7	–	6
Middle Tennessee	3	–	5	4	–	8
FIU	3	–	5	6	–	7
Old Dominion	0	–	8	1	–	11
West Division
UAB xy	6	–	2	9	–	5
Louisiana Tech x	6	–	2	10	–	3
Southern Miss	5	–	3	7	–	6
North Texas	3	–	5	4	–	8
UTSA	3	–	5	4	–	8
Rice	3	–	5	3	–	9
UTEP	0	–	8	1	–	11
Championship: Florida Atlantic 49, UAB 6
$ – Conference champion; x – Division champion/co-champions; y – Championship game participant

The 2019 UAB Blazers football team represented the University of Alabama at Birmingham (UAB) as a member of the West Division in Conference USA (C-USA) during the 2019 NCAA Division I FBS football season. Led by fourth-year head coach Bill Clark, the Blazers compiled an overall record of 9–5 with a mark of 6–2 in conference play, sharing C-USA's West Division title with Louisiana Tech. UAB advanced to the C-USA Championship Game, where the Blazers lost to Florida Atlantic. They were then invited to the Appalachian State, losing to Appalachian State. The team played home games at Legion Field in Birmingham, Alabama.

== Schedule ==
UAB announced its 2019 football schedule on January 10, 2019. The 2019 schedule consisted of six home and six away games in the regular season.

Date	Time	Opponent	Site	TV	Result	Attendance
August 29	7:00 p.m.	Alabama State*	Legion Field; Birmingham, AL	ESPN+	W 24–19	39,165
September 7	11:00 a.m.	at Akron*	InfoCision Stadium–Summa Field; Akron, OH	CBSSN	W 31–20	18,972
September 21	2:30 p.m.	South Alabama*	Legion Field; Birmingham, AL	NFLN	W 35–3	27,932
September 28	6:00 p.m.	at Western Kentucky	Houchens Industries–L. T. Smith Stadium; Bowling Green, KY	ESPN+	L 13–20	20,304
October 5	6:00 p.m.	Rice	Legion Field; Birmingham, AL	ESPN+	W 35–20	23,526
October 12	5:00 p.m.	at UTSA	Alamodome; San Antonio, TX	ESPN+	W 33–14	15,728
October 19	3:00 p.m.	Old Dominion^{†}	Legion Field; Birmingham, AL	ESPN+	W 38–14	19,511
November 2	6:00 p.m.	at Tennessee*	Neyland Stadium; Knoxville, TN	ESPNU	L 7–30	85,791
November 9	2:30 p.m.	at Southern Miss	M. M. Roberts Stadium; Hattiesburg, MS	NFLN	L 2–37	23,819
November 16	12:00 p.m.	UTEP	Legion Field; Birmingham, AL	ESPN3	W 37–10	19,875
November 23	2:30 p.m.	Louisiana Tech	Legion Field; Birmingham, AL	ESPN+	W 20–14	18,346
November 30	3:00 p.m.	at North Texas	Apogee Stadium; Denton, TX	Stadium	W 26–21	16,406
December 7	12:30 p.m.	at Florida Atlantic	FAU Stadium; Boca Raton, FL (C-USA Championship Game)	CBSSN	L 6–49	14,387
December 21	8:00 p.m.	vs. No. 20 Appalachian State*	Mercedes-Benz Superdome; New Orleans, LA (New Orleans Bowl)	ESPN	L 17–31	21,202
*Non-conference game; ^{†}Homecoming; Rankings from AP Poll and CFP Rankings after November 5 released prior to game; All times are in Central time

== Preseason ==
=== CUSA media poll ===
Conference USA released their preseason media poll on July 16, 2019, with the Blazers predicted to finish in fourth place in the West Division.

=== Preseason All-Conference USA teams ===
2019 Preseason All-Conference USA

All-CUSA Offense
Position	Player	Class
RB	Spencer Brown	Jr.

All-CUSA Defense
Position	Player	Class
DL	Garrett Marino	Sr.

All-CUSA Special Teams
Position	Player	Class
No players were selected

== Game summaries ==
=== Alabama State ===
	1	2	3	4	Total
Hornets	13	0	6	0	19
Blazers	14	10	0	0	24

=== At Akron ===
	1	2	3	4	Total
Blazers	7	10	14	0	31
Zips	6	0	0	14	20

=== South Alabama ===
	1	2	3	4	Total
Jaguars	3	0	0	0	3
Blazers	14	14	7	0	35

=== At Western Kentucky ===
	1	2	3	4	Total
Blazers	3	7	3	0	13
Hilltoppers	3	10	0	7	20

=== Rice ===
	1	2	3	4	Total
Owls	7	13	0	0	20
Blazers	0	21	14	0	35

=== At UTSA ===
	1	2	3	4	Total
Blazers	3	13	7	10	33
Roadrunners	0	7	7	0	14

=== Old Dominion ===
	1	2	3	4	Total
Monarchs	0	3	11	0	14
Blazers	14	14	7	3	38

=== At Tennessee ===
	1	2	3	4	Total
Blazers	0	0	0	7	7
Volunteers	6	17	7	0	30

=== At Southern Miss ===
	1	2	3	4	Total
Blazers	0	2	0	0	2
Golden Eagles	7	13	10	7	37

=== UTEP ===
	1	2	3	4	Total
Miners	0	7	0	3	10
Blazers	17	6	7	7	37

=== Louisiana Tech ===
	1	2	3	4	Total
Bulldogs	0	7	0	7	14
Blazers	3	10	7	0	20

=== At North Texas ===
	1	2	3	4	Total
Blazers	3	14	9	0	26
Mean Green	7	7	7	0	21

=== At Florida Atlantic (C-USA Championship game) ===
	1	2	3	4	Total
Blazers	3	3	0	0	6
Owls	14	21	7	7	49

=== Vs. Appalachian State (New Orleans Bowl) ===
	1	2	3	4	Total
Blazers	14	0	3	0	17
No. 20 Mountaineers	0	10	21	0	31
