= Griffin Hebert =

American football player (born 1999)

Profile
- Position: Wide receiver

Personal information
- Born: April 2, 1999 (age 27); Lafayette, Louisiana, U.S.
- Listed height: 6 ft 1 in (1.85 m)
- Listed weight: 239 lb (108 kg)

Career information
- High school: St. Thomas More (Lafayette)
- College: Louisiana Tech (2017–2022)
- NFL draft: 2023: undrafted

Career history
- Seattle Seahawks (2023)*; Philadelphia Eagles (2023–2024)
- * Offseason or practice squad member only
- Stats at Pro Football Reference

Griffin Carl Hebert (born April 2, 1999) is an American professional football wide receiver. He played college football at Louisiana Tech.

== Early life ==
Hebert grew up in Lafayette, Louisiana, where he spent his childhood. He attended St. Thomas More Catholic High School. Hebert eclipsed 1,000 receiving yards with 24 touchdowns in his career. He earned a total of six letters in both football and basketball. He led St. Thomas More to its first state title in history in 2016. He was named All-Acadiana and All-District as both a junior and senior. Hebert committed to play college football at Louisiana Tech.

== College career ==
Hebert played mostly on special teams as a freshman. He played all 13 games as a sophomore, making 8 starts and finishing the season with 30 receptions for 537 receiving yards and a team-leading six receiving touchdowns. As a junior, Hebert registered 19 receptions for 275 yards and three touchdowns and averaged 27.50 receiving yards per game. As a senior, he registered 23 receptions for 431 yards and two touchdowns on the season.

== Professional career ==
Pre-draft measurables
Height	Weight	Arm length	Hand span	40-yard dash	10-yard split	20-yard split	20-yard shuttle	Three-cone drill	Vertical jump	Broad jump	Bench press
6 ft 1 1/2 in (1.87 m)	239 lb (108 kg)	31 1/2 in (0.80 m)	9 3/4 in (0.25 m)	4.58 s	1.58 s	2.66 s	4.27 s	6.95 s	39.5 in (1.00 m)	10 ft 2 in (3.10 m)	27 reps
All values from Pro Day

=== Seattle Seahawks ===
Hebert signed with the Seattle Seahawks as an undrafted free agent on May 12, 2023, shortly after the conclusion of the 2023 NFL Draft. Hebert caught three passes for 21 yards in the preseason before being waived in late August.

=== Philadelphia Eagles ===
On December 28, 2023, Hebert was signed to the Philadelphia Eagles practice squad. He was waived on April 30, 2024. Herbert signed with the Eagles again on July 25. He was waived on August 27, and re-signed to the practice squad. He was released on September 10.
