= Kennesaw State Owls football statistical leaders =

The Kennesaw State Owls football statistical leaders are individual statistical leaders of the Kennesaw State Owls football program in various categories, including passing, rushing, receiving, total offense, defensive stats, and kicking. Within those areas, the lists identify single-game, single-season, and career leaders. The Owls represent Kennesaw State University (KSU) in the NCAA Division I FBS Conference USA (CUSA).

Kennesaw State began competing in intercollegiate football in 2015, so the typical issues with school records do not exist. There is no period of the late 19th and early 20th century with spotty, incomplete records. Therefore, Owls' records are also not affected by the lengthening of the season to 12 games over the years, the 1972 NCAA decision to allow freshmen to play varsity football, or the 2002 NCAA decision to count bowl games in players' official statistics.

However, other aspects of college football rules and playing conditions have allowed players in select seasons extra games to accumulate statistics.

- KSU started play as a member of Division I FCS, not joining FBS until 2024. Before a coming change to a 12-game regular season in 2026, FCS regular seasons were normally limited to 11 games. However, two aspects of FCS rules have allowed for more games:
  - The NCAA organizes an FCS championship tournament, currently called the NCAA Division I Football Championship. The Owls reached the FCS playoffs 4 times, playing 9 games in all, before moving to FBS. As in the case of FBS bowl games, the NCAA started counting FCS playoff games toward players' official statistics in 2002.
  - Additionally, pre-2026 NCAA rules allowed FCS teams to schedule 12 regular-season games in years when the period starting with the Thursday before Labor Day and ending with the final Saturday in November contains 14 Saturdays.
- Since 2018, players in both FCS and FBS have been allowed to participate in as many as four games in a redshirt season; previously, playing in even one game "burned" the redshirt. Since 2024, postseason games have not counted against the four-game limit. These changes to redshirt rules have given many KSU players several extra games to accumulate statistics.
- Due to COVID-19 issues, the NCAA ruled that the 2020 season would not count against the athletic eligibility of any football player, giving everyone who played in that season the opportunity for five years of eligibility instead of the normal four.
- CUSA has held a championship game since 2005. KSU played in (and won) the 2025 edition.

These lists are updated through the 2025 season. Players active for KSU in 2025 are in bold.

== Passing ==
=== Passing yards ===
Career
Rank	Player	Yards	Years
1	Chandler Burks	3,638	2015 2016 2017 2018
2	**Amari Odom**	2,594	2025
3	Xavier Shepherd	2,544	2019 2020 2021 2022
4	Jonathan Murphy	2,218	2019 2020 2021 2022 2023
5	Davis Bryson	1,548	2022 2023 2024 2025
6	Daniel David	1,274	2016 2017 2018 2019
7	Trey White	1,141	2015 2016

Single season
Rank	Player	Yards	Year
1	**Amari Odom**	2,594	2025
2	Davis Bryson	1,495	2024
3	Xavier Shepherd	1,341	2021
4	Chandler Burks	1,307	2017
5	Chandler Burks	1,250	2016
6	Jonathan Murphy	1,190	2023
7	Trey White	1,059	2015
8	Chandler Burks	1,043	2018

Single game
Rank	Player	Yards	Year	Opponent
1	**Amari Odom**	387	2025	Missouri State
2	Jonathan Murphy	308	2023	Furman
	**Amari Odom**	308	2025	Arkansas State
4	Rickie Collins	293	2026	Jacksonville State
5	Dexter Williams II	290	2025	Louisiana Tech
6	Rickie Collins	260	2026	Georgia State
	Rickie Collins	260	2026	Missouri State
8	Landon Varnes	254	2026	Delaware
9	**Amari Odom**	248	2025	Jacksonville State (Note: This was the regularly scheduled game between the teams. They later met in that season's CUSA championship game.)
10	**Amari Odom**	246	2025	Jacksonville State (CUSA Championship Game)

=== Passing touchdowns ===
Career
Rank	Player	TDs	Years
1	Chandler Burks	33	2015 2016 2017 2018
2	Xavier Shepherd	23	2019 2020 2021 2022
3	**Amari Odom**	19	2025
4	Jonathan Murphy	16	2019 2020 2021 2022 2023
5	Tommy Bryant	8	2017 2018 2019 2020
	Trey White	8	2015 2016
	Daniel David	8	2016 2017 2018 2019

Single season
Rank	Player	TDs	Year
1	**Amari Odom**	19	2025
2	Xavier Shepherd	15	2021
3	Chandler Burks	13	2016
4	Chandler Burks	10	2018
5	Chandler Burks	9	2017
6	Trey White	8	2015
	Jonathan Murphy	8	2023

Single game
Rank	Player	TDs	Year	Opponent
1	**Amari Odom**	5	2025	Missouri State
2	Xavier Shepherd	4	2021	Gardner-Webb
	Xavier Shepherd	4	2021	Robert Morris
	Dexter Williams II	4	2025	Louisiana Tech
	**Amari Odom**	4	2025	Liberty

== Rushing ==
=== Rushing yards ===
Career
Rank	Player	Yards	Years
1	Chandler Burks	2,813	2015 2016 2017 2018
2	Darnell Holland	2,431	2015 2016 2017 2018
3	Jake McKenzie	2,005	2015 2016 2017 2018
4	Shaq Terry	1,790	2017 2018 2019 2020
5	Jonathan Murphy	1,740	2019 2020 2021 2022 2023
6	Xavier Shepherd	1,580	2019 2020 2021 2022

Single season
Rank	Player	Yards	Year
1	Chandler Burks	1,103	2017
2	Trey White	964	2015
3	Darnell Holland	949	2018
4	Bronson Rechsteiner	909	2019
5	Chandler Burks	905	2018

Single game
Rank	Player	Yards	Year	Opponent
1	Bronson Rechsteiner	221	2019	Missouri State
2	Jonathan Murphy	206	2019	Wofford
3	Darnell Holland	195	2018	Monmouth
4	Isaac Foster	183	2019	Missouri
5	Chaston Bennett	179	2016	Clark Atlanta
	Xavier Shepherd	179	2021	Hampton
7	Trey White	170	2015	Gardner-Webb
8	Jonathan Murphy	164	2021	East Tennessee State
9	Chaston Bennett	155	2015	Dayton
	Trey White	155	2015	Presbyterian

=== Rushing touchdowns ===
Career
Rank	Player	TDs	Years
1	Chandler Burks	56	2015 2016 2017 2018
2	Xavier Shepherd	35	2019 2020 2021 2022
3	Jonathan Murphy	27	2019 2020 2021 2022 2023
4	Darnell Holland	26	2015 2016 2017 2018
5	Tommy Bryant	23	2017 2018 2019 2020
6	Daniel David	21	2016 2017 2018 2019

Single season
Rank	Player	TDs	Year
1	Chandler Burks	29	2018
2	Xavier Shepherd	23	2021
3	Chandler Burks	18	2017
4	Tommy Bryant	16	2019
5	Daniel David	14	2019

Single game
Rank	Player	TDs	Year	Opponent
1	Trey White	4	2016	Monmouth
	Chandler Burks	4	2017	Monmouth
	Tommy Bryant	4	2019	Gardner-Webb
	Xavier Shepherd	4	2021	Monmouth
	Xavier Shepherd	4	2021	Davidson

== Receiving ==
=== Receptions ===
Career
Rank	Player	Rec	Years
1	Justin Sumpter	111	2015 2016 2017 2018
	**Gabriel Benyard**	111	2021 2022 2023 2024 2025
3	Isaac Foster	61	2018 2019 2020 2021 2022 2023
4	**Christian Moss**	59	2024 2025
5	Blake Bohannon	43	2021 2022 2023 2024
6	Shaq Terry	41	2017 2018 2019 2020
7	Tykeem Wallace	37	2022 2023 2024 2025
8	Xavier Harper	36	2015 2016 2017 2018
9	Darnell Holland	35	2015 2016 2017 2018

Single season
Rank	Player	Rec	Year
1	**Gabriel Benyard**	60	2025
2	**Christian Moss**	45	2025
3	Justin Sumpter	33	2017
4	Justin Sumpter	31	2016
5	Qua Ashley	28	2024
6	Isaac Foster	27	2022
7	Justin Sumpter	26	2015
	**Coleman Bennett**	26	2025
	**Clayton Coppock**	26	2025
10	Blake Bohannon	24	2024
	Tykeem Wallace	24	2024

Single game
Rank	Player	Rec	Year	Opponent
1	Zion Booker	10	2026	Tennessee
	Dylan Gary	10	2026	Missouri State
2	Justin Sumpter	8	2016	Duquesne

=== Receiving yards ===
Career
Rank	Player	Yards	Years
1	Justin Sumpter	1,989	2015 2016 2017 2018
2	**Gabriel Benyard**	1,751	2021 2022 2023 2024 2025
3	**Christian Moss**	892	2024 2025
4	Shaq Terry	819	2017 2018 2019 2020
5	Isaac Foster	793	2018 2019 2020 2021 2022 2023
6	Xavier Harper	690	2015 2016 2017 2018
7	Blake Bohannon	654	2021 2022 2023 2024
8	Darnell Holland	606	2015 2016 2017 2018
9	Caleb O'Neal	586	2018 2019 2020 2021

Single season
Rank	Player	Yards	Year
1	**Gabriel Benyard**	949	2025
2	**Christian Moss**	689	2025
3	Justin Sumpter	610	2017
4	Justin Sumpter	538	2016
5	Justin Sumpter	525	2015
6	Xavier Harper	376	2016
7	Shaq Terry	370	2019

Single game
Rank	Player	Yards	Year	Opponent
1	Justin Sumpter	187	2016	Duquesne
2	Brayden Munroe	159	2026	Jacksonville State
3	Justin Sumpter	147	2016	Furman
4	**Gabriel Benyard**	136	2023	Furman
5	Dylan Gary	135	2026	Missouri State
6	**Gabriel Benyard**	127	2025	Missouri State
7	**Gabriel Benyard**	123	2023	Chattanooga
8	Justin Sumpter	121	2015	Shorter
	Xavier Harper	121	2016	Presbyterian
10	**Gabriel Benyard**	114	2025	Arkansas State

=== Receiving touchdowns ===
Career
Rank	Player	TDs	Years
1	Justin Sumpter	21	2015 2016 2017 2018
2	**Gabriel Benyard**	17	2021 2022 2023 2024 2025
3	TJ Reed	8	2016 2017 2018 2019
4	Chaston Bennett	7	2015 2016
	Caleb O'Neal	7	2018 2019 2020 2021
6	Shaq Terry	6	2017 2018 2019 2020

Single season
Rank	Player	TDs	Year
1	**Gabriel Benyard**	9	2025
2	Justin Sumpter	8	2016
3	Justin Sumpter	5	2017
	Chaston Bennett	5	2016
	Shaq Terry	5	2019
	Caleb O'Neal	5	2021
	**Clayton Coppock**	5	2025

Single game
Rank	Player	TDs	Year	Opponent
1	Justin Sumpter	2	2016	Point
	Justin Sumpter	2	2016	Duquesne
	Justin Sumpter	2	2017	Samford
	Shaq Terry	2	2019	Campbell
	Xavier Hill	2	2021	Gardner-Webb
	Caleb O'Neal	2	2021	Robert Morris
	**Gabriel Benyard**	2	2023	Furman
	**Gabriel Benyard**	2	2025	New Mexico State
	**Gabriel Benyard**	2	2025	Missouri State
	**Clayton Coppock**	2	2025	Missouri State
	**Gabriel Benyard**	2	2025	Liberty
	Dylan Gary	2	2026	Middle Tennessee

== Total offense ==
Total offense is the sum of passing and rushing statistics. It does not include receiving or returns.

=== Total offense yards ===
Career
Rank	Player	Yards	Years
1	Chandler Burks	6,451	2015 2016 2017 2018
2	Xavier Shepherd	4,124	2019 2020 2021 2022
3	Jonathan Murphy	3,868	2019 2020 2021 2022 2023
4	**Amari Odom**	2,941	2025
5	Jake McKenzie	2,469	2015 2016 2017 2018
6	Darnell Holland	2,431	2015 2016 2017 2018

Single season
Rank	Player	Yards	Year
1	**Amari Odom**	2,941	2025
2	Chandler Burks	2,410	2017
3	Xavier Shepherd	2,208	2021
4	Chandler Burks	2,049	2016
5	Trey White	2,023	2015
6	Chandler Burks	1,948	2018

Single game
Rank	Player	Yards	Year	Opponent
1	**Amari Odom**	419	2025	Missouri State
2	**Amari Odom**	409	2025	Arkansas State
3	Jonathan Murphy	371	2023	Furman
4	Rickie Collins	354	2026	Jacksonville State
5	**Amari Odom**	312	2025	Liberty
6	Jonathan Murphy	309	2023	Tusculuum
7	Rickie Collins	306	2026	Georgia State
8	**Amari Odom**	299	2025	Jacksonville State (Note: This was the regularly scheduled game between the teams. They later met in that season's CUSA championship game.)
9	Dexter Williams II	295	2025	Louisiana Tech
10	Trey White	294	2015	Point
	Chandler Burks	294	2018	Charleston Southern

=== Touchdowns responsible for ===
"Touchdowns responsible for" is the NCAA's official term for combined passing and rushing touchdowns.

Career
Rank	Player	TDs	Years
1	Chandler Burks	89	2015 2016 2017 2018
2	Xavier Shepherd	58	2019 2020 2021 2022
3	Jonathan Murphy	43	2019 2020 2021 2022 2023
4	Tommy Bryant	31	2017 2018 2019 2020
5	Daniel David	29	2016 2017 2018 2019

Single season
Rank	Player	TDs	Year
1	Chandler Burks	39	2018
2	Xavier Shepherd	38	2021
3	Chandler Burks	27	2017
4	**Amari Odom**	26	2025
5	Tommy Bryant	23	2019
6	Chandler Burks	22	2016

Single game
Rank	Player	TDs	Year	Opponent
1	**Amari Odom**	6	2025	Missouri State
2	Trey White	5	2016	Monmouth
	Chandler Burks	5	2017	Monmouth
	Tommy Bryant	5	2019	Presbyterian
	Xavier Shepherd	5	2021	Davidson
	**Amari Odom**	5	2025	Liberty

== Defense ==
=== Interceptions ===
Career
Rank	Player	Ints	Years
1	Markeith Montgomery	12	2018 2019 2020 2021 2022 2023
2	Dante Blackmon	8	2015 2016
3	Taylor Henkle	7	2015 2016 2017
	Deontre Morris	7	2022 2023
5	Dorian Walker	6	2017 2018 2019
	Bryson Armstrong	6	2017 2018 2019 2020

Single season
Rank	Player	Ints	Year
1	Dante Blackmon	6	2016
2	Markeith Montgomery	5	2022
	Deontre Morris	5	2022
4	Keon Roman	4	2017
	Taylor Henkle	4	2015
	Cincere Mason	4	2018

Single game
Rank	Player	Ints	Year	Opponent
1	Dante Blackmon	3	2016	Duquesne
	Chance Gamble	3	2022	UT Martin

=== Tackles ===
Career
Rank	Player	Tackles	Years
1	Bryson Armstrong	320	2017 2018 2019 2020
2	Anthony Gore	275	2015 2016 2017 2018
3	Izzy Sam	198	2015 2016 2017
4	**Garland Benyard**	189	2021 2022 2023 2024 2025
5	Markeith Montgomery	181	2018 2019 2020 2021 2022 2023
	**Baron Hopson**	181	2023 2024 2025
7	Taylor Henkle	168	2015 2016 2017
8	Desmond Johnson Jr.	148	2016 2017 2018 2019

Single season
Rank	Player	Tackles	Year
1	**Baron Hopson**	138	2025
2	Evan Thompson	117	2021
3	Bryson Armstrong	114	2017
4	Bryson Armstrong	95	2019
5	Donelius Johnson	89	2024
6	Izzy Sam	82	2017
7	Tywon Christopher	81	2025
8	Anthony Gore	80	2018

Single game
Rank	Player	Tackles	Year	Opponent
1	Evan Thompson	17	2021	Gardner-Webb

=== Sacks ===
Career
Rank	Player	Sacks	Years
1	Bryson Armstrong	18.5	2017 2018 2019 2020
2	Desmond Johnson Jr.	17.0	2016 2017 2018 2019
3	Peyton Moore	11.0	2017 2018 2019 2020 2021
	Travis Bell	11.0	2018 2019 2020 2021 2022
5	Anthony Gore	10.0	2015 2016 2017 2018

Single season
Rank	Player	Sacks	Year
1	Bryson Armstrong	11.0	2017
2	**Elijah Hill**	9.0	2025
3	Desmond Johnson Jr.	7.0	2019
4	Desmond Johnson Jr.	6.0	2016
	Anthony Gore	6.0	2018
6	Travis Bell	5.0	2019
	Tylon Dunlap	5.0	2025

Single game
Rank	Player	Sacks	Year	Opponent
1	Joel Parker	3.0	2019	Alabama State
	**Garland Benyard**	3.0	2024	Middle Tennessee

== Kicking ==
=== Field goals made ===
Career
Rank	Player	FGs	Years
1	Justin Thompson	40	2015 2016 2017 2018
2	Nathan Robertson	27	2018 2019 2020 2021 2022
3	Conor Cummins	15	2021 2022 2023
4	Austin Welch	14	2024
5	**Britton Williams**	7	2025 (Note: Williams also played for KSU in 2024, but was not a placekicker.)
6	**Daniel Kinney**	6	2025
7	Jordan Genovese	2	2016 2017
8	Jacob Ulrich	1	2023 2024

Single season
Rank	Player	FGs	Year
1	Justin Thompson	17	2017
2	Austin Welch	14	2024
3	Justin Thompson	12	2015
4	Nathan Robertson	10	2019
	Nathan Robertson	10	2021
	Conor Cummins	10	2022

Single game
Rank	Player	FGs	Year	Opponent
1	Justin Thompson	4	2015	Shorter
1	Justin Thompson	4	2015	Gardner-Webb

=== Field goal percentage ===
Career (min. 5 attempts)
Rank	Player	FG%	Years
1	**Daniel Kinney**	85.7%	2025
2	Austin Welch	77.8%	2024
3	Justin Thompson	75.5%	2015 2016 2017 2018
4	Nathan Robertson	67.5%	2018 2019 2020 2021 2022
5	Conor Cummins	57.7%	2021 2022 2023

Single season (min. 5 attempts)
Rank	Player	FG%	Year
1	**Daniel Kinney**	85.7%	2025
2	Justin Thompson	81.8%	2018
3	Justin Thompson	81.0%	2017
4	Austin Welch	77.8%	2024
5	Nathan Robertson	76.9%	2021
6	Nathan Robertson	71.4%	2019
	Nathan Robertson	71.4%	2021
	Conor Cummins	71.4%	2022
