= List of Kennesaw State Owls football seasons =

This is a list of seasons completed by the Kennesaw State college football program. The Owls represent Kennesaw State University (KSU) in Conference USA. KSU plays its home games at Fifth Third Stadium in Kennesaw, Georgia.

== Seasons ==
National champions †	Conference champions *	Division champions' ‡	Bowl game berth	College Football Playoff game §	Shared standing T	Not applicable

Season	Team	Head coach	Season results					Championship and postseason results	Final ranking	
Season	Team	Head coach	Conference			Overall		Championship and postseason results	AP/STATS	Coaches'
Season	Team	Head coach	Finish^{(Note: When in a division, it shows their position within the division. Otherwise the overall position in the division-less conference is listed.)}	Win(s)	Loss(es)	Win(s)	Loss(es)	Championship and postseason results	AP/STATS	Coaches'
Kennesaw State Owls
Independent (2015–2021)
2015	2015	Brian Bohannon	T–5th	2	4	6	5			
2016	2016	Brian Bohannon	T–3rd	3	2	8	3			
2017	2017*	Brian Bohannon	1st*	5	0	12	2	L NCAA Division I quarterfinal	8	9
2018	2018*	Brian Bohannon	1st*	5	0	11	2	L NCAA Division I quarterfinal	5	5
2019	2019	Brian Bohannon	2nd	5	1	11	3	L NCAA Division I second round	13	8
2020–21	2020	Brian Bohannon	2nd	2	1	4	1		17	15
2021	2021*	Brian Bohannon	1st	7	0	11	2	L NCAA Division I second round	11	10
ASUN Conference (2022)
2022	2022	Brian Bohannon	5th	1	4	5	6			
NCAA Division I FCS independent (2023)
2023	2023	Brian Bohannon				3	6			
Conference USA (2024–)
2024	2024	Brian Bohannon; Chandler Burks (Note: After a 1–8 start to the season, Bohannon stepped away from the program and was replaced by assistant coach Chandler Burks.)	T–8th	2	6	2	10			
2025	2025*	Jerry Mack	T–1st*	7	1	10	4	L Myrtle Beach Bowl		
2026	2026	Jerry Mack								
Total						82	41	(all games)		

*The 2020 FCS season was played in the spring of 2021 due to the COVID-19 pandemic.
