= 2019 Rice Owls football team =

American college football season

2019 Rice Owls football
- Conference: Conference USA
- West Division
- Record: 3–9 (3–5 C-USA)
- Head coach: Mike Bloomgren (2nd season)
- Offensive coordinator: Jerry Mack (2nd season)
- Offensive scheme: Multiple
- Defensive coordinator: Brian Smith (2nd season)
- Base defense: Multiple 3–4
- Home stadium: Rice Stadium

2019 Conference USA football standings
	Conf.			Overall
Team	W		L	W		L
East Division
Florida Atlantic xy$	7	–	1	11	–	3
Marshall	6	–	2	8	–	5
Western Kentucky	6	–	2	9	–	4
Charlotte	5	–	3	7	–	6
Middle Tennessee	3	–	5	4	–	8
FIU	3	–	5	6	–	7
Old Dominion	0	–	8	1	–	11
West Division
UAB xy	6	–	2	9	–	5
Louisiana Tech x	6	–	2	10	–	3
Southern Miss	5	–	3	7	–	6
North Texas	3	–	5	4	–	8
UTSA	3	–	5	4	–	8
Rice	3	–	5	3	–	9
UTEP	0	–	8	1	–	11
Championship: Florida Atlantic 49, UAB 6
$ – Conference champion; x – Division champion/co-champions; y – Championship game participant

The 2019 Rice Owls football team represented Rice University in the 2019 NCAA Division I FBS football season. The Owls played their home games at Rice Stadium in Houston, Texas, and competed in the West Division of Conference USA (C–USA). They were led by second-year head coach Mike Bloomgren. They finished the season 3–9, 3–5 in C-USA play to finish in a three-way tie for fourth place in the West Division. Rice started the season on a nine-game losing streak before closing out the season by winning its final three games.

== Preseason ==
=== Award watch lists ===
Listed in the order that they were released

Award	Player	Position	Year
Wuerffel Trophy	Nick Leverett	OG	SR

=== C-USA media poll ===
The preseason poll was released prior to the Conference USA media days on July 17–18, 2019. The Owls were predicted to finish in sixth place in the C–USA West Division.

=== Preseason All–C-USA teams ===
The Owls were the only team in the West Division that had no players selected to the preseason All−Conference USA teams.

=== Recruiting class ===
College recruiting information
Name	Hometown	School	Height	Weight	40^{‡}	Commit date
Chike Anigbogu; Safety	Missouri City, TX	Ridge Point HS	5 ft 10 in (1.78 m)	190 lb (86 kg)	-	Feb 6, 2019
Chike Anigbogu; Safety	Recruit ratings: Scout: Rivals: 247Sports: ESPN:					
Jake Bailey; Safety	San Clemente, CA	St. John Bosco HS	5 ft 10 in (1.78 m)	175 lb (79 kg)	-	Dec 19, 2018
Jake Bailey; Safety	Recruit ratings: Scout: Rivals: 247Sports: ESPN:					
Adrian Bickham; Defensive Lineman	Angie, LA	Varnado HS	6 ft 3 in (1.91 m)	200 lb (91 kg)	-	Dec 19, 2018
Adrian Bickham; Defensive Lineman	Recruit ratings: Scout: Rivals: 247Sports: ESPN:					
Garrett Braden; Outside Linebacker	New Canaan, CT	New Canaan HS	6 ft 2 in (1.88 m)	215 lb (98 kg)	-	Dec 19, 2018
Garrett Braden; Outside Linebacker	Recruit ratings: Scout: Rivals: 247Sports: ESPN:					
Jack Bradley; Tight End	Dallas, TX	Bishop Lynch HS	6 ft 5 in (1.96 m)	230 lb (100 kg)	-	Dec 19, 2018
Jack Bradley; Tight End	Recruit ratings: Scout: Rivals: 247Sports: ESPN:					
De'Braylon Carroll; Defensive tackle	Duncanville, TX	Duncanville HS	6 ft 0 in (1.83 m)	285 lb (129 kg)	-	Feb 6, 2019
De'Braylon Carroll; Defensive tackle	Recruit ratings: Scout: Rivals: 247Sports: ESPN:					
Brian Chaffin; Center	Harrisburg, NC	Charlotte Christian; Stanford	6 ft 2 in (1.88 m)	275 lb (125 kg)	-	Feb 6, 2019
Brian Chaffin; Center	Recruit ratings: Scout: Rivals: 247Sports: ESPN:					
Izeya Floyd; Defensive tackle	Frisco, TX	Reedy HS	6 ft 2 in (1.88 m)	305 lb (138 kg)	-	Dec 19, 2018
Izeya Floyd; Defensive tackle	Recruit ratings: Scout: Rivals: 247Sports: ESPN:					
Hunter Henry; Safety	Austin, TX	Lake Travis HS	6 ft 1 in (1.85 m)	201 lb (91 kg)	-	Dec 19, 2018
Hunter Henry; Safety	Recruit ratings: Scout: Rivals: 247Sports: ESPN:					
Zack Hoban; Kicker	West Orange, NJ	Seton Hall Prep	6 ft 1 in (1.85 m)	201 lb (91 kg)	-	Dec 19, 2018
Zack Hoban; Kicker	Recruit ratings: Scout: Rivals: 247Sports: ESPN:					
Connor Hughes; Offensive Guard	Katy, TX	Cinco Ranch HS	6 ft 2 in (1.88 m)	300 lb (140 kg)	-	Feb 6, 2019
Connor Hughes; Offensive Guard	Recruit ratings: Scout: Rivals: 247Sports: ESPN:					
Jerry Johnson III; Offensive Guard	Port Saint Lucie, FL	Treasure Coast HS	6 ft 1 in (1.85 m)	180 lb (82 kg)	-	Feb 6, 2019
Jerry Johnson III; Offensive Guard	Recruit ratings: Scout: Rivals: 247Sports: ESPN:					
Jovoni Johnson; Quarterback	Conway, AR	Conway HS	6 ft 3 in (1.91 m)	203 lb (92 kg)	-	Feb 6, 2019
Jovoni Johnson; Quarterback	Recruit ratings: Scout: Rivals: 247Sports: ESPN:					
Hunter Jones; Center	Stockton, CA	Saint Mary's HS	6 ft 3 in (1.91 m)	270 lb (120 kg)	-	Dec 19, 2018
Hunter Jones; Center	Recruit ratings: Scout: Rivals: 247Sports: ESPN:					
Isaac Klarkowksi; Defensive Lineman	Green Bay, WI	Southwest HS	6 ft 2 in (1.88 m)	275 lb (125 kg)	-	Feb 6, 2019
Isaac Klarkowksi; Defensive Lineman	Recruit ratings: Scout: Rivals: 247Sports: ESPN:					
Jawan King; Running Back	Atlanta, TX	Atlanta HS	5 ft 10 in (1.78 m)	210 lb (95 kg)	-	Dec 19, 2018
Jawan King; Running Back	Recruit ratings: Scout: Rivals: 247Sports: ESPN:					
Zane Knipe; Wide Receiver	Houston, TX	Lamar HS	5 ft 11 in (1.80 m)	170 lb (77 kg)	-	Dec 19, 2018
Zane Knipe; Wide Receiver	Recruit ratings: Scout: Rivals: 247Sports: ESPN:					
Edmond Lahlouh; Linebacker	Redwood City, CA	Junipero Serra HS	6 ft 0 in (1.83 m)	205 lb (93 kg)	-	Feb 6, 2019
Edmond Lahlouh; Linebacker	Recruit ratings: Scout: Rivals: 247Sports: ESPN:					
Joshua Landrum; Cornerback	Cedar Hill, TX	Cedar Hill HS	5 ft 10 in (1.78 m)	155 lb (70 kg)	-	Dec 19, 2018
Joshua Landrum; Cornerback	Recruit ratings: Scout: Rivals: 247Sports: ESPN:					
Nick Leverett; Offensive Lineman	Concord, NC	Concord HS; North Carolina Central	6 ft 4 in (1.93 m)	312 lb (142 kg)	-	Dec 19, 2018
Nick Leverett; Offensive Lineman	Recruit ratings: Scout: Rivals: 247Sports: ESPN:					
Kirk Lockhart; Safety	Cedar Hill, TX	Cedar Hill HS	5 ft 11 in (1.80 m)	170 lb (77 kg)	-	Dec 19, 2018
Kirk Lockhart; Safety	Recruit ratings: Scout: Rivals: 247Sports: ESPN:					
Bennett Mecom; Wide Receiver	Frisco, TX	Reedy HS	6 ft 3 in (1.91 m)	200 lb (91 kg)	-	Feb 6, 2019
Bennett Mecom; Wide Receiver	Recruit ratings: Scout: Rivals: 247Sports: ESPN:					
Charlie Mendes; Punter	Van Nuys, CA	Harvard–Westlake HS	6 ft 3 in (1.91 m)	185 lb (84 kg)	-	Feb 6, 2019
Charlie Mendes; Punter	Recruit ratings: Scout: Rivals: 247Sports: ESPN:					
Myron Morrison; Linebacker	Humble, TX	Atascocita HS	6 ft 3 in (1.91 m)	193 lb (88 kg)	-	Feb 6, 2019
Myron Morrison; Linebacker	Recruit ratings: Scout: Rivals: 247Sports: ESPN:					
Ayden Noriega; Running Back	Amarillo, TX	Tascosa HS	5 ft 9 in (1.75 m)	170 lb (77 kg)	-	Feb 6, 2019
Ayden Noriega; Running Back	Recruit ratings: Scout: Rivals: 247Sports: ESPN:					
Josh Pearcy; Outside Linebacker/defensive End	Moorestown, NJ	Moorestown HS	6 ft 2 in (1.88 m)	210 lb (95 kg)	-	Dec 19, 2018
Josh Pearcy; Outside Linebacker/defensive End	Recruit ratings: Scout: Rivals: 247Sports: ESPN:					
Regan Riddle; Offensive Guard	Dallas, TX	Highland Park HS	6 ft 1 in (1.85 m)	284 lb (129 kg)	-	Dec 19, 2018
Regan Riddle; Offensive Guard	Recruit ratings: Scout: Rivals: 247Sports: ESPN:					
Bradley Rozner; Wide Receiver	Needville, TX	Needville HS; Cisco JC	6 ft 5 in (1.96 m)	190 lb (86 kg)	-	Dec 19, 2018
Bradley Rozner; Wide Receiver	Recruit ratings: Scout: Rivals: 247Sports: ESPN:					
Naeem Smith; Safety	Iowa City, IA	Iowa City HS; Ellsworth JC	5 ft 11 in (1.80 m)	195 lb (88 kg)	-	Dec 19, 2018
Naeem Smith; Safety	Recruit ratings: Scout: Rivals: 247Sports: ESPN:					
Tom Stewart; Quarterback	Dallas, TX	Parish Episcopal HS; Harvard	6 ft 3 in (1.91 m)	220 lb (100 kg)	-	Feb 6, 2019
Tom Stewart; Quarterback	Recruit ratings: Scout: Rivals: 247Sports: ESPN:					
Nick Wagman; Offensive Tackle	Potomac, MD	Winston Churchill HS	6 ft 3 in (1.91 m)	245 lb (111 kg)	-	Feb 6, 2019
Nick Wagman; Offensive Tackle	Recruit ratings: Scout: Rivals: 247Sports: ESPN:					

== Personnel ==
2019 Rice Owls football team roster
Players
Coaches
Offense

Pos.	#	Name	Class
RB	1	Aston Walter	Sr
WR	2	Bradley Rozner	Jr
QB	3	Jovoni Johnson	Fr
WR	4	Sam Glaesmann	Jr
QB	5	Wiley Green	Fr
FB	6	Reagan Williams	Sr
TE	7	Jordan Myers	Jr
WR	8	Cameron Montgomery	So
RB	9	Nahshon Ellerbe	Sr
WR	10	Austin Trammell	Jr
WR	11	Jake Bailey	Fr
WR	12	Austin Conrad	So
WR	13	Zane Knipe	Fr
QB	14	Tom Stewart	Sr
WR	15	Chris Boudreaux	So
QB	16	Robbie Blosser	So
QB	17	Parker Towns	Fr
TE	18	Robert French	Fr
QB	19	Evan Marshman	So
RB	21	Juma Otoviano	So
RB	22	Jawan King	Fr
RB	23	Charlie Booker	Sr
RB	27	Ayden Noriega	Fr
RB	30	Ari Broussard	Fr
FB	32	Jerry Johnson III	Fr
FB	35	Luke Amrstrong	Fr
WR	38	Jashon Palmer	Fr
OL	53	Cole Elms	Sr
OL	54	Isaac Klarkowski	Fr
OL	55	Nick Leverett	Sr
OL	58	Shea Baker	So
OT	63	Brandt Pederson	So
C	65	Brian Chaffin	Sr
OL	67	Connor Hughes	Fr
OL	71	Clay Servin	Fr
C	72	Hunter Jones	Fr
OL	73	Cole Garcia	So
OT	74	Nick Wagman	Fr
OL	75	Derek Ferraro	Fr
OL	76	Justin Gooseberry	Sr
OL	77	Uzoma Osuji	Jr
G	79	Regan Riddle	Fr
TE	80	Jonathan Sanchez	So
TE	82	Jaeger Bull	So
WR	83	Rhett Cardwell	Sr
WR	84	Bennett Mecom	Fr
FB	85	Brendan Suckley	Fr
TE	87	Jack Bradley	Fr
WR	88	August Pitre III	Fr

Defense

Pos.	#	Name	Class
LB	1	Antonio Montero	So
S	3	Naeem Smith	Jr
DB	4	Prudy Calderon	So
S	5	Dasharm Newsome	Jr
LB	6	Jaquez Battley	So
DE	7	Trey Schuman	So
LB	8	Dylan Silcox	Jr
S	9	Kirk Lockhart	Fr
DE	10	Kenneth Orji	So
DE	11	Cameron Valentine	Fr
DB	12	D'Angelo Ellis	Jr
CB	13	Miles McCord	So
CB	14	Joshua Landrum	Fr
CB	15	Andrew Bird	Fr
LB	17	TreShawn Chamberlain	So
DB	18	Tyrae Thornton	So
CB	19	Tre'Shon Devones	Fr
DB	20	George Nyakwol	Jr
CB	22	Jason White	Fr
DB	23	Isaiah Richardson	So
CB	24	Collin Whitaker	Jr
S	26	Hunter Henry	Fr
S	29	Chike Anigbogu	Fr
DB	31	Matthew Sams	Fr
DE	33	Anthony Ekpe	Jr
S	37	Jacob Grams	So
OLB	41	Garrett Braden	Fr
LB	42	Dylan James	Jr
LB	44	Kebreyun Page	So
LB, LS	46	Garrett Grammer	Jr
DE	48	Jacob Doddridge	Fr
DL	50	Hunter Hanley	Fr
DL	51	Will Martinez	Fr
DE	52	Javante Hubbard	Jr
LB	55	Blake Alldredge	Jr
LB	56	EJ Lahlouh	Fr
LB	57	Myron Morrison	Fr
DE	89	Miles Adams	Fr
DE	90	Blain Padgett	Sr
DL	91	Ikenna Enechukwu	Fr
OLB, DE	94	Josh Pearcy	Fr
DL	95	Izeya Floyd	Fr
DT	96	De'Braylon Carroll	Fr
DL	97	Adrian Bickham	Fr
DL	99	Myles Adams	Sr

Special teams

Pos.	#	Name	Class
K	16	Zach Hoban	Fr
K	25	Will Harrison	So
P	29	Adam Nunez	Sr
LS	34	Campbell Riddle	So
K, P	85	Nicholas McQuarry	Fr
P	86	Chris Barnes	Sr
P	91	Charlie Mendes	Fr

Head coach

- Mike Bloomgren (Florida State)

Coordinators/assistant coaches

- Jerry Mack (Delta State)
  Offensive coordinator/RB
- Brian Smith (UMass)
  Defensive coordinator/S
- Drew Svoboda (Stephen F. Austin)
  Special teams coordinator
- Joe Ashfield (Delta State)
  Offensive line
- Bill Best (West Texas A&M)
  Tight ends
- Cedric Calhoun (Morehouse College)
  Defensive line
- Mike Kershaw (Delta State)
  Wide receivers
- Robbie Picazo (Stanford)
  Quarterbacks
- Scott Vestal (SMU)
  Recruiting coordinator/LB
- Gerard Wilcher (Morehouse College)
  Cornerbacks

Legend

- (C) Team captain
- (S) Suspended
- (I) Ineligible
- Injured
- Redshirt

Roster
Last update: 26 May 2020

== Schedule ==
Date	Time	Opponent	Site	TV	Result	Attendance
August 30	5:00 p.m.	at Army*	Michie Stadium; West Point, NY	CBSSN	L 7–14	23,238
September 7	7:00 p.m.	Wake Forest*	Rice Stadium; Houston, TX	CBSSN	L 21–41	17,567
September 14	7:00 p.m.	No. 12 Texas*	NRG Stadium; Houston, TX (rivalry)	CBSSN	L 13–48	42,417
September 21	6:00 p.m.	Baylor*	Rice Stadium; Houston, TX	CBSSN	L 13–21	20,198
September 28	6:00 p.m.	Louisiana Tech	Rice Stadium; Houston, TX	ESPN3	L 20–23 ^{OT}	19,075
October 5	6:00 p.m.	at UAB	Legion Field; Birmingham, AL	ESPN+	L 20–35	23,526
October 19	5:00 p.m.	at UTSA	Alamodome; San Antonio, TX	ESPN3	L 27–31	17,657
October 26	12:00 p.m.	Southern Miss	Rice Stadium; Houston, TX	ESPN+	L 6–20	20,367
November 2	2:30 p.m.	Marshall^{†}	Rice Stadium; Houston, TX	Stadium Facebook	L 7–20	17,385
November 16	3:30 p.m.	at Middle Tennessee	Johnny "Red" Floyd Stadium; Murfreesboro, TN	ESPN+	W 31–28	10,411
November 23	2:30 p.m.	North Texas	Rice Stadium; Houston, TX	NFLN	W 20–14	18,477
November 30	2:00 p.m.	at UTEP	Sun Bowl; El Paso, TX	ESPN3	W 30–16	11,776
*Non-conference game; ^{†}Homecoming; Rankings from AP Poll and College Football Playoff Rankings after November 5 released prior to game; All times are in Central time

== Game summaries ==
Statistics	Rice	Army
First downs	10	17
Total yards	243	284
Rushing yards	181	231
Passing yards	62	53
Turnovers	0	1
Time of possession	25:09	34:51

=== At Army ===
Rice at Army – Game summary

Quarter	1	2	3	4	Total
Owls	0	7	0	0	7
Black Knights	0	7	0	7	14

at Michie Stadium, West Point, NY

- Date: August 30, 2019
- Game time: 6:00 p.m. EDT
- Game attendance: 23,238
- Referee: Jerry Magallanes
- TV announcers (CBSSN): Ben Holden (play-by-play), Ross Tucker (analyst) & Tina Cervasio (sideline)

Game information

First Quarter
No scoring
Second Quarter

- (08:50) ARMY TD – Kelvin Hopkins Jr. 2-yard rush, Cole Talley kick
  Drive: 16 plays, 95 yards, 9:48; Army 7–0
- (06:30) RICE TD – Nahshon Ellerbe 54-yard rush, Will Harrison kick
  Drive: 4 plays, 75 yards, 2:20; Tied 7–7

Third Quarter
No scoring
Fourth Quarter

- (03:58) ARMY TD – Kell Walker 17-yard pass from Kelvin Hopkins Jr., Cole Talley kick
  Drive: 18 plays, 96 yards, 9:21; Army 14–7

Passing

- RICE – Wiley Green: 7/14, 62 yards
- ARMY – Kelvin Hopkins Jr.: 3/8, 53 yards, 1 TD

Rushing

- RICE – Nahshon Ellerbe: 9 carries, 103 yards, 1 TD
- ARMY – Kelvin Hopkins Jr.: 21 carries, 80 yards, 1 TD

Receiving

- RICE – Austin Trammell: 4 receptions, 40 yards
- ARMY – Artice Hobbs IV: 1 reception, 19 yards

Statistics	Wake Forest	Rice
First downs	19	20
Total yards	513	321
Rushing yards	201	67
Passing yards	312	254
Turnovers	0	1
Time of possession	23:46	36:14

=== Wake Forest ===
Wake Forest at Rice – Game summary

Quarter	1	2	3	4	Total
Demon Deacons	14	10	10	7	41
Owls	14	0	0	7	21

at Rice Stadium, Houston, TX

- Date: September 7, 2019
- Game time: 7:00 p.m. CDT
- Game weather: Temperature: 95 °F (35 °C) • Wind: S 5 mph • Weather: Clear, Hot
- Game attendance: 17,567
- Referee: Jonathan Noli
- TV announcers (CBSSN): Ben Holden (play-by-play) & Ross Tucker (analyst)

Game information

First Quarter

- (11:55) WF TD – Christian Beal-Smith 2-yard rush, Nick Sciba kick
  Drive: 10 plays, 75 yards, 3:05; Wake Forest 7–0
- (08:39) WF TD – Sage Surratt 7-yard pass from Jamie Newman, Nick Sciba kick
  Drive: 4 plays, 31 yards, 1:10; Wake Forest 14–0
- (04:32) RICE TD – Aston Walter 1-yard rush, Will Harrison kick
  Drive: 10 plays, 75 yards, 4:07; Wake Forest 14–7
- (01:31) RICE TD – Tom Stewart 10-yard rush, Will Harrison kick
  Drive: 4 plays, 40 yards, 2:00; Tied 14–14

Second Quarter

- (14:55) WF TD – Scotty Washington 25-yard pass from Jamie Newman, Nick Sciba kick
  Drive: 5 plays, 75 yards, 1:36; Wake Forest 21–14
- (07:48) WF FG – Nick Sciba 26-yard field goal
  Drive: 10 plays, 55 yards, 3:26; Wake Forest 24–14

Third Quarter

- (11:26) WF FG – Nick Sciba 23-yard field goal
  Drive: 7 plays, 55 yards, 2:03; Wake Forest 27–14
- (05:04) WF TD – Scotty Washington 59-yard pass from Jamie Newman, Nick Sciba kick
  Drive: 3 plays, 71 yards, 0:44; Wake Forest 34–14

Fourth Quarter

- (13:18) WF TD – Kenneth Walker III 96-yard rush, Nick Sciba kick
  Drive: 1 play, 96 yards, 0:14; Wake Forest 41–14
- (01:51) RICE TD – Austin Trammell 19-yard pass from Tom Stewart, Will Harrison kick
  Drive: 9 plays, 65 yards, 4:37; Wake Forest 41–21

Passing

- WF – Jamie Newman: 21/27, 312 yards, 3 TD
- RICE – Tom Stewart: 19/30, 185 yards, 1 TD

Rushing

- WF – Kenneth Walker III: 9 carries, 125 yards, 1 TD
- RICE – Aston Walker: 8 carries, 29 yards, 1 TD

Receiving

- WF – Scotty Washington: 7 receptions, 158 yards, 2 TD
- RICE – Brad Rozner: 6 receptions, 103 yards

Statistics	Texas	Rice
First downs	28	13
Total yards	509	266
Rushing yards	171	87
Passing yards	338	179
Turnovers	0	0
Time of possession	33:47	26:13

=== Vs. Texas ===
Texas vs. Rice – Game summary

Quarter	1	2	3	4	Total
No. 12 Longhorns	14	17	7	10	48
Owls	0	0	0	13	13

at NRG Stadium, Houston, TX

- Date: September 14, 2019
- Game time: 7:00 p.m. CDT
- Game weather: N/A (Indoors)
- Game attendance: 42,417
- Referee: Rodney Burnette
- TV announcers (CBSSN): Carter Blackburn (play-by-play), Aaron Taylor (analyst) & Jenny Dell (sideline)

Game information

First Quarter

- (08:46) UT TD – Roschon Johnson 25-yard pass from Sam Ehlinger, Cameron Dicker kick
  Drive: 12 plays, 82 yards, 6:14; Texas 7–0
- (03:21) UT TD – Jake Smith 53-yard pass from Sam Ehlinger, Cameron Dicker kick
  Drive: 7 plays, 90 yards, 3:13; Texas 14–0

Second Quarter

- (12:11) UT TD – Keaontay Ingram 26-yard rush, Cameron Dicker kick
  Drive: 10 plays, 73 yards, 4:29; Texas 21–0
- (06:33) UT TD – Jake Smith 12-yard pass from Sam Ehlinger, Cameron Dicker kick
  Drive: 8 plays, 79 yards, 3:30; Texas 28–0
- (01:01) UT FG – Cameron Dicker 57-yard field goal
  Drive: 4 plays, 2 yards, 0:54; Texas 31–0

Third Quarter

- (06:32) UT TD – Keaontay Ingram 14-yard rush, Cameron Dicker kick
  Drive: 11 plays, 91 yards, 4:48; Texas 38–0

Fourth Quarter

- (07:50) RICE TD – Aston Walter 3-yard pass from Tom Stewart, Will Harrison kick failed
  Drive: 12 plays, 73 yards, 6:26; Texas 38–6
- (03:29) UT FG – Cameron Dicker 46-yard field goal
  Drive: 7 plays, 40 yards, 4:21; Texas 41–6
- (01:07) RICE TD – Aston Walter 4-yard pass from Tom Stewart, Antonio Montero kick
  Drive: 8 plays, 75 yards, 2:22; Texas 41–13
- (00:53) UT TD – D'Shawn Jamison 98-yard kickoff return, Cameron Dicker kick
  Drive: 0 plays, 0 yards, 0:00; Texas 48–13

Passing

- UT – Sam Ehlinger: 23/27, 279 yards, 3 TD
- RICE – Tom Stewart: 12/23, 179 yards, 2 TD

Rushing

- UT – Keaontay Ingram: 13 carries, 74 yards, 2 TD
- RICE – Aston Walker: 16 carries, 69 yards

Receiving

- UT – Jake Smith: 6 receptions, 75 yards, 2 TD
- RICE – Austin Trammell: 6 receptions, 97 yards

Statistics	Baylor	Rice
First downs	20	17
Total yards	427	242
Rushing yards	124	64
Passing yards	303	178
Turnovers	2	1
Time of possession	27:45	32:15

=== Baylor ===
Baylor at Rice – Game summary

Quarter	1	2	3	4	Total
Bears	7	14	0	0	21
Owls	0	3	3	7	13

at Rice Stadium, Houston, TX

- Date: September 21, 2019
- Game time: 6:00 p.m. CDT
- Game weather: Temperature: 85 °F (29 °C) • Wind: E 10 mph • Weather: Partly Cloudy
- Game attendance: 20,198
- Referee: Billy Williams
- TV announcers (CBSSN): Dave Ryan (play-by-play), Corey Chavous (analyst) & Katie Emmer (sideline)

Game information

First Quarter

- (03:12) BAY TD – Josh Fleeks 6-yard rush, John Mayers kick
  Drive: 9 plays, 86 yards, 4:01; Baylor 7–0

Second Quarter

- (08:09) RICE FG – Will Harrison 28-yard field goal
  Drive: 13 plays, 55 yards, 6:47; Baylor 7–3
- (05:02) BAY TD – Chris Platt 50-yard pass from Charlie Brewer, John Mayers kick
  Drive: 7 plays, 84 yards, 3:07; Baylor 14–3
- (00:15) BAY TD – Charlie Brewer 25-yard rush, John Mayers kick
  Drive: 5 plays, 74 yards, 0:29; Baylor 21–3

Third Quarter

- (03:50) RICE FG – Will Harrison 24-yard field goal
  Drive: 14 plays, 55 yards, 6:35; Baylor 21–6

Fourth Quarter

- (08:42) RICE TD – Tom Stewart 21-yard rush, Will Harrison kick
  Drive: 4 plays, 46 yards, 1:17; Baylor 21–13

Passing

- BAY – Charlie Brewer: 20/27, 303 yards, 1 TD
- RICE – Wiley Green: 13/23, 128 yards

Rushing

- BAY – Charlie Brewer: 12 carries, 58 yards, 1 TD
- RICE – Charlie Booker: 12 carries, 29 yards

Receiving

- BAY – Denzel Mims: 6 receptions, 102 yards
- RICE – Brad Rozner: 7 receptions, 100 yards

Statistics	Louisiana Tech	Rice
First downs	19	19
Total yards	294	338
Rushing yards	84	190
Passing yards	210	148
Turnovers	0	1
Time of possession	23:07	36:53

=== Louisiana Tech ===
Louisiana Tech at Rice – Game summary

Quarter	1	2	3	4	OT	Total
Bulldogs	7	0	7	3	6	23
Owls	7	7	0	3	3	20

at Rice Stadium, Houston, TX

- Date: September 28, 2019
- Game time: 6:00 p.m. CDT
- Game weather: Temperature: 88 °F (31 °C) • Wind: S 7–10 mph • Weather: Clear
- Game attendance: 19,075
- Referee: Chris Bynum
- TV announcers (ESPN3): David Saltzman (play-by-play) & ND Kalu (analyst)

Game information

First Quarter

- (09:58) RICE TD – Aston Walter 16-yard rush, Will Harrison kick
  Drive: 6 plays, 46 yards, 3:09; Rice 7–0
- (03:32) LT TD – Adrian Hardy 9-yard pass from J'Mar Smith, Bailey Hale kick
  Drive: 11 plays, 73 yards, 6:26; Tied 7–7

Second Quarter

- (13:25) RICE TD – Aston Walter 2-yard rush, Will Harrison kick
  Drive: 10 plays, 65 yards, 5:07; Rice 14–7

Third Quarter

- (01:23) LT TD – Justin Henderson 26-yard rush, Bailey Hale kick
  Drive: 7 plays, 76 yards, 2:58; Tied 14–14

Fourth Quarter

- (02:51) RICE FG – Chris Barnes 37-yard field goal
  Drive: 14 plays, 53 yards, 7:09; Rice 17–14
- (01:10) LT FG – Bailey Hale 31-yard field goal
  Drive: 8 plays, 56 yards, 1:41; Tied 17–17

Overtime

- RICE FG – Chris Barnes 36-yard field goal
  Drive: 4 plays, 8 yards, 0:00; Rice 20–17
- LT TD – J'Mar Smith 12-yard rush
  Drive: 5 plays, 25 yards, 0:00; Louisiana Tech 23–20

Passing

- LT – J'Mar Smith: 21/39, 210 yards, 1 TD
- RICE – Wiley Green: 14/22, 128 yards

Rushing

- LT – Justin Henderson: 12 carries, 64 yards, 1 TD
- RICE – Aston Walter: 20 carries, 112 yards, 2 TD

Receiving

- LT – Adrian Hardy: 6 receptions, 78 yards, 1 TD
- RICE – Brad Rozner: 5 receptions, 64 yards

Statistics	Rice	UAB
First downs	22	17
Total yards	305	412
Rushing yards	134	127
Passing yards	171	285
Turnovers	4	2
Time of possession	29:06	30:54

=== At UAB ===
Rice at Alabama–Birmingham – Game summary

Quarter	1	2	3	4	Total
Owls	7	13	0	0	20
Blazers	0	21	14	0	35

at Legion Field, Birmingham, AL

- Date: October 5, 2019
- Game time: 6:00 p.m. CDT
- Game weather: Temperature: 83 °F (28 °C) • Wind: S 2–3 mph • Weather: Partly Cloudy
- Game attendance: 23,526
- Referee: Joe Lehring
- TV announcers (ESPN+): Will Kollmeyer (play-by-play) & Lee Roberts (analyst)

Game information

First Quarter

- (14:09) RICE TD – Aston Walter 64-yard rush, Chris Barnes kick
  Drive: 2 plays, 75 yards, 0:51; Rice 7–0

Second Quarter

- (14:45) UAB TD – Kendall Parham 46-yard pass from Tyler Johnston III, Nick Vogel kick
  Drive: 7 plays, 95 yards, 2:41; Tied 7–7
- (12:34) UAB TD – Austin Watkins Jr. 36-yard pass from Tyler Johnston III, Nick Vogel kick
  Drive: 2 plays, 67 yards, 0:26; Alabama–Birmingham 14–7
- (07:49) RICE TD – Brad Rozner 4-yard pass from Wiley Green, Chris Barnes kick
  Drive: 10 plays, 75 yards, 4:45; Tied 14–14
- (07:33) UAB TD – Kendall Parham 57-yard pass from Tyler Johnston III, Nick Vogel kick
  Drive: 1 play, 57 yards, 0:09; Alabama–Birmingham 21–14
- (04:00) RICE TD – August Pitre III 3-yard pass from Wiley Green, Chris Barnes kick blocked
  Drive: 7 plays, 75 yards, 3:33; Alabama–Birmingham 21–20

Third Quarter

- (09:17) UAB TD – Lucious Stanley 25-yard rush, Nick Vogel kick
  Drive: 6 plays, 77 yards, 3:09; Alabama–Birmingham 28–20
- (00:53) UAB TD – Lucious Stanley 7-yard rush, Nick Vogel kick
  Drive: 6 plays, 18 yards, 2:44; Alabama–Birmingham 35–20

Fourth Quarter
No scoring

Passing

- RICE – Wiley Green: 15/34, 161 yards, 2 TD
- UAB – Tyler Johnston III: 14/25, 282 yards, 3 TD, 2 INT

Rushing

- RICE – Aston Walter: 16 carries, 102 yards, 1 TD
- UAB – Lucious Stanley: 19 carries, 88 yards, 2 TD

Receiving

- RICE – Austin Trammell: 5 receptions, 113 yards
- UAB – Kendall Parham: 3 receptions, 109 yards, 2 TD

Statistics	Rice	UTSA
First downs	21	19
Total yards	369	361
Rushing yards	146	149
Passing yards	223	212
Turnovers	4	1
Time of possession	34:44	25:16

=== At UTSA ===
Rice at Texas–San Antonio – Game summary

Quarter	1	2	3	4	Total
Owls	3	7	14	3	27
Roadrunners	7	0	17	7	31

at Alamodome, San Antonio, TX

- Date: October 19, 2019
- Game time: 5:00 p.m. CDT
- Game weather: Temperature: 74 °F (23 °C) • Weather: Indoors
- Game attendance: 17,657
- Referee: Rodney Burnette
- TV announcers (ESPN3): Lincoln Rose (play-by-play), LaDarrin McClane (analyst) & Brooke Shoemaker (sideline)

Game information

First Quarter

- (06:03) RICE FG – Chris Barnes 31-yard field goal
  Drive: 13 plays, 71 yards, 7:23; Rice 3–0
- (00:59) UTSA TD – Zakhari Franklin 8-yard pass from Lowell Narcisse, Hunter Duplessis kick
  Drive: 13 plays, 60 yards, 5:04; UTSA 7–3

Second Quarter

- (00:16) RICE TD – August Pitre III 2-yard pass from Wiley Green, Chris Barnes kick
  Drive: 7 plays, 78 yards, 3:49; Rice 10–7

Third Quarter

- (14:50) UTSA TD – Rashad Wisdom 34-yard interception return, Lucas Dean pass intercepted
  Drive: 0 plays, 0 yards, 0:00; UTSA 13–10
- (12:33) RICE TD – Brad Rozner 19-yard pass from Tom Stewart, Chris Barnes kick
  Drive: 4 plays, 75 yards, 2:17; Rice 17–13
- (08:58) UTSA FG – Hunter Duplessis 34-yard field goal
  Drive: 11 plays, 58 yards, 3:35; Rice 17–16
- (03:09) RICE TD – Aston Walter 1-yard rush, Chris Barnes kick
  Drive: 2 plays, 22 yards, 0:47; Rice 24–16
- (00:49) UTSA TD – Sincere McCormick 6-yard rush, Sheldon Jones pass
  Drive: 6 plays, 75 yards, 2:20; Tied 24–24

Fourth Quarter

- (09:02) RICE FG – Chris Barnes 37-yard field goal
  Drive: 13 plays, 56 yards, 6:47; Rice 27–24
- (05:06) UTSA TD – Zakhari Franklin 8-yard pass from Lowell Narcisse, Hunter Duplessis kick
  Drive: 9 plays, 79 yards, 3:56; UTSA 31–27

Passing

- RICE – Wiley Green: 11/18, 135 yards, 1 TD, 1 INT
- UTSA – Lowell Narcisse: 19/29, 212 yards, 2 TD, 1 INT

Rushing

- RICE – Aston Walter: 18 carries, 109 yards, 1 TD
- UTSA – Sincere McCormick: 14 carries, 94 yards, 1 TD

Receiving

- RICE – Brad Rozner: 9 receptions, 138 yards, 1 TD
- UTSA – Carlos Strickland II: 6 receptions, 86 yards

Statistics	Southern Miss	Rice
First downs	18	14
Total yards	364	139
Rushing yards	157	8
Passing yards	207	131
Turnovers	1	1
Time of possession	30:45	29:15

=== Southern Miss ===
Southern Mississippi at Rice – Game summary

Quarter	1	2	3	4	Total
Golden Eagles	0	10	3	7	20
Owls	0	0	6	0	6

at Rice Stadium, Houston, TX

- Date: October 26, 2019
- Game time: 12:00 p.m. CDT
- Game weather: Temperature: 56 °F (13 °C) • Wind: W 7 mph • Weather: Partly Cloudy
- Game attendance: 20,367
- Referee: Ken Antee
- TV announcers (ESPN+): David Saltzman (play-by-play) & N. D. Kalu (analyst)

Game information

First Quarter
No scoring
Second Quarter

- (09:53) USM FG – Andrew Stein 23-yard field goal
  Drive: 13 plays, 44 yards, 4:54; Southern Miss 3–0
- (03:35) USM TD – Kevin Perkins 2-yard rush, Andrew Stein kick
  Drive: 10 plays, 67 yards, 3:37; Southern Miss 10–0

Third Quarter

- (09:32) USM FG – Andrew Stein 34-yard field goal
  Drive: 9 plays, 47 yards, 4:24; Southern Miss 13–0
- (05:59) RICE TD – Austin Trammell 15-yard pass from Wiley Green, Chris Barnes kick failed
  Drive: 7 plays, 70 yards, 3:33; Southern Miss 13–6

Fourth Quarter

- (00:32) USM TD – Kevin Perkins 38-yard rush, Andrew Stein kick
  Drive: 9 plays, 88 yards, 4:35; Southern Miss 20–6

Passing

- USM – Jack Abraham: 23/36, 207 yards, 1 INT
- RICE – Wiley Green: 12/26, 104 yards, 1 TD, 1 INT

Rushing

- USM – Kevin Perkins: 13 carries, 86 yards, 2 TD
- RICE – Charlie Booker: 10 carries, 28 yards

Receiving

- USM – Tim Jones: 10 receptions, 96 yards
- RICE – Austin Trammell: 5 receptions, 52 yards, 1 TD

Statistics	Marshall	Rice
First downs	18	16
Total yards	391	231
Rushing yards	122	128
Passing yards	269	53
Turnovers	0	0
Time of possession	33:08	26:52

=== Marshall ===
Marshall at Rice – Game summary

Quarter	1	2	3	4	Total
Thundering Herd	3	14	3	0	20
Owls	0	7	0	0	7

at Rice Stadium, Houston, TX

- Date: November 2, 2019
- Game time: 2:30 p.m. CDT
- Game weather: Temperature: 65 °F (18 °C) • Wind: NNW 7 mph • Weather: Sunny, Light Clouds
- Game attendance: 17,385
- Referee: Billy Williams
- TV announcers (Stadium Facebook): Chris Hassel (play-by-play), A. J. Hawk (analyst) & Kristen Balboni (sideline)

Game information

First Quarter

- (01:08) MARSH FG – Justin Rohrwasser 22-yard field goal
  Drive: 9 plays, 67 yards, 4:38; Marshall 3–0

Second Quarter

- (10:20) RICE TD – Austin Trammell 2-yard pass from JoVoni Johnson, Chris Barnes kick
  Drive: 11 plays, 66 yards, 5:44; Rice 7–3
- (09:33) MARSH TD – Brenden Knox 1-yard rush, Justin Rohrwasser kick
  Drive: 2 plays, 64 yards, 0:43; Marshall 10–7
- (00:28) MARSH TD – Talik Keaton 19-yard pass from Isaiah Green, Justin Rohrwasser kick
  Drive: 13 plays, 95 yards, 6:11; Marshall 17–7

Third Quarter

- (02:47) MARSH FG – Justin Rohrwasser 49-yard field goal
  Drive: 11 plays, 47 yards, 4:36; Marshall 20–7

Fourth Quarter
No scoring

Passing

- MARSH – Isaiah Green: 17/22, 269 yards, 1 TD
- RICE – JoVoni Johnson: 10/17, 97 yards, 1 TD

Rushing

- MARSH – Brenden Knox: 27 carries, 130 yards, 1 TD
- RICE – Juma Otoviano: 14 carries, 66 yards

Receiving

- MARSH – Armani Levias: 7 receptions, 96 yards
- RICE – Austin Trammell: 4 receptions, 35 yards, 1 TD

Statistics	Rice	Middle Tennessee
First downs	17	21
Total yards	377	444
Rushing yards	155	106
Passing yards	222	338
Turnovers	0	2
Time of possession	35:26	24:34

=== At Middle Tennessee ===
Rice at Middle Tennessee – Game summary

Quarter	1	2	3	4	Total
Owls	10	21	0	0	31
Blue Raiders	0	14	7	7	28

at Johnny "Red" Floyd Stadium, Murfreesboro, TN

- Date: November 16, 2019
- Game time: 3:30 p.m. CST
- Game weather: Temperature: 53 °F (12 °C) • Wind: N 10 mph • Weather: Sunny, Clear, Cool
- Game attendance: 10,411
- Referee: Justin Elliott
- TV announcers (ESPN+): Jake Rose (play-by-play), Alex Myers (analyst) & Kaitlyn Runyon (sideline)

Game information

First Quarter

- (10:50) RICE FG – Chris Barnes 42-yard field goal
  Drive: 7 plays, 15 yards, 4:00; Rice 3–0
- (02:11) RICE TD – Brad Rozner 30-yard pass from Tom Stewart, Chris Barnes kick
  Drive: 6 plays, 53 yards, 3:31; Rice 10–0

Second Quarter

- (11:27) RICE TD – Brad Rozner 18-yard pass from Tom Stewart, Chris Barnes kick
  Drive: 8 plays, 50 yards, 4:02; Rice 17–0
- (08:01) MTSU TD – Asher O'Hara 2-yard rush, Crews Holt kick
  Drive: 9 plays, 74 yards, 3:26; Rice 17–7
- (05:29) MTSU TD – Ty Lee 90-yard pass from Asher O'Hara, Crews Holt kick
  Drive: 1 play, 90 yards, 0:14; Rice 17–14
- (04:31) RICE TD – Aston Walter 34-yard rush, Chris Barnes kick
  Drive: 2 plays, 40 yards, 0:50; Rice 24–14
- (00:14) RICE TD – Brad Rozner 34-yard pass from Tom Stewart, Chris Barnes kick
  Drive: 9 plays, 79 yards, 2:53; Rice 31–14

Third Quarter

- (04:19) MTSU TD – Asher O'Hara 7-yard rush, Crews Holt kick
  Drive: 6 plays, 43 yards, 2:17; Rice 31–21

Fourth Quarter

- (03:22) MTSU TD – Jimmy Marshall 20-yard pass from Asher O'Hara, Crews Holt kick
  Drive: 6 plays, 91 yards, 2:03; Rice 31–28

Passing

- RICE – Tom Stewart: 18/23, 222 yards, 3 TD
- MTSU – Asher O'Hara: 22/31, 338 yards, 2 TD, 1 INT

Rushing

- RICE – Aston Walter: 15 carries, 106 yards, 1 TD
- MTSU – Asher O'Hara: 19 carries, 79 yards, 2 TD

Receiving

- RICE – Brad Rozner: 8 receptions, 130 yards, 3 TD
- MTSU – Ty Lee: 7 receptions, 154 yards, 1 TD

Statistics	North Texas	Rice
First downs	10	19
Total yards	238	328
Rushing yards	75	122
Passing yards	163	206
Turnovers	2	2
Time of possession	21:56	38:04

=== North Texas ===
North Texas at Rice – Game summary

Quarter	1	2	3	4	Total
Mean Green	0	0	7	7	14
Owls	10	10	0	0	20

at Rice Stadium, Houston, TX

- Date: November 23, 2019
- Game time: 2:30 p.m. CST
- Game weather: Temperature: 62 °F (17 °C) • Wind: NW 10 mph • Weather: Sunny & Clear
- Game attendance: 18,477
- Referee: Joe Lehring
- TV announcers (NFLN): Dan Hellie (play-by-play), Michael Robinson (analyst) & Molly Sullivan (sideline)

Game information

First Quarter

- (10:16) RICE FG – Chris Barnes 48-yard field goal
  Drive: 8 plays, 36 yards, 3:26; Rice 3–0
- (07:25) RICE TD – Aston Walter 1-yard rush, Chris Barnes kick
  Drive: 6 plays, 39 yards, 2:44; Rice 10–0

Second Quarter

- (14:53) RICE TD – Charlie Booker 8-yard rush, Chris Barnes kick
  Drive: 7 plays, 58 yards, 3:10; Rice 17–0
- (08:03) RICE FG – Chris Barnes 21-yard field goal
  Drive: 10 plays, 43 yards, 5:21; Rice 20–0

Third Quarter

- (06:32) UNT TD – Mason Fine 10-yard rush, Ethan Mooney kick
  Drive: 4 plays, 69 yards, 1:28; Rice 20–7

Fourth Quarter

- (07:32) UNT TD – Tre Siggers 1-yard rush, Ethan Mooney kick
  Drive: 12 plays, 60 yards, 4:58; Rice 20–14

Passing

- UNT – Mason Fine: 17/32, 163 yards, 1 INT
- RICE – Tom Stewart: 17/27, 179 yards

Rushing

- UNT – DeAndre Torrey: 5 carries, 41 yards
- RICE – Charlie Booker: 22 carries, 78 yards, 1 TD

Receiving

- UNT – Greg White: 3 receptions, 42 yards
- RICE – Austin Trammell: 7 receptions, 91 yards

Statistics	Rice	UTEP
First downs	16	18
Total yards	371	312
Rushing yards	256	99
Passing yards	115	213
Turnovers	2	0
Time of possession	27:27	32:33

=== At UTEP ===
Rice at Texas–El Paso – Game summary

Quarter	1	2	3	4	Total
Owls	14	0	10	6	30
Miners	6	10	0	0	16

at Sun Bowl, El Paso, TX

- Date: November 30, 2019
- Game time: 1:00 p.m. MST
- Game weather: Temperature: 55 °F (13 °C) • Wind: Windy • Weather: Sunny
- Game attendance: 11,776
- Referee: Chris Bynum
- TV announcers (ESPN3): Andy Morgan (play-by-play) & Trevor Vittatoe (analyst)

Game information

First Quarter

- (11:48) RICE TD – Austin Trammell 3-yard pass from Tom Stewart, Chris Barnes kick
  Drive: 3 plays, 28 yards, 1:07; Rice 7–0
- (03:07) UTEP TD – Praise Amaewhule 0-yard fumble return, Brady Viles kick failed
  Drive: 0 plays, 0 yards, 0:00; Rice 7–6
- (00:02) RICE TD – Aston Walter 30-yard rush, Chris Barnes kick
  Drive: 6 plays, 67 yards, 2:57; Rice 14–6

Second Quarter

- (11:38) UTEP TD – Justin Garrett 12-yard pass from Kai Locksley, Gavin Baechle kick
  Drive: 6 plays, 75 yards, 3:24; Rice 14–13
- (00:00) UTEP FG – Gavin Baechle 45-yard field goal
  Drive: 11 plays, 47 yards, 3:51; UTEP 16–14

Third Quarter

- (07:16) RICE FG – Chris Barnes 21-yard field goal
  Drive: 9 plays, 72 yards, 4:06; Rice 17–16
- (02:44) RICE TD – JoVoni Johnson 8-yard rush, Chris Barnes kick
  Drive: 6 plays, 67 yards, 3:29; Rice 24–16

Fourth Quarter

- (04:27) RICE TD – JoVoni Johnson 11-yard rush, Chris Barnes kick blocked
  Drive: 4 plays, 80 yards, 2:36; Rice 30–16

Passing

- RICE – Tom Stewart: 8/16, 115 yards, 1 TD, 1 INT
- UTEP – Gavin Hardison: 11/24, 113 yards

Rushing

- RICE – Aston Walter: 16 carries, 149 yards, 1 TD
- UTEP – Kai Locksley: 12 carries, 63 yards

Receiving

- RICE – Austin Trammell: 4 receptions, 54 yards, 1 TD
- UTEP – Jacob Cowing: 7 receptions, 56 yards
