= Darnell Holland =

American football player (born 1996)

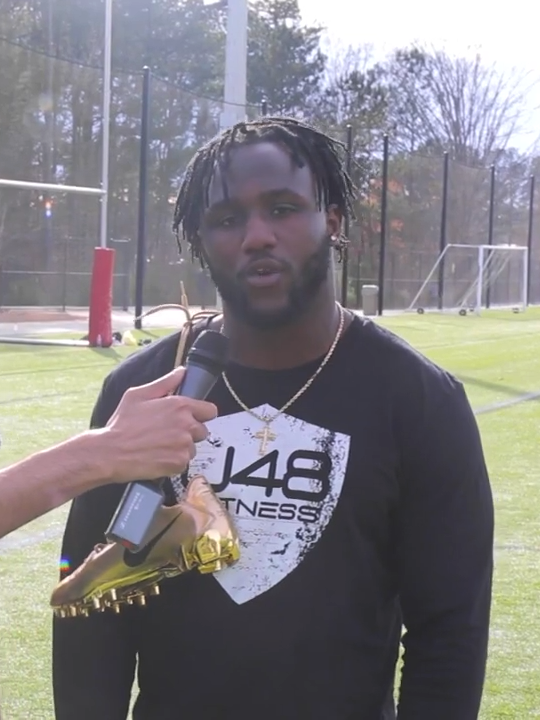
- Holland in 2019

No. 33
- Position: Running back

Personal information
- Born: November 6, 1996 (age 30); Bowdon, Georgia, U.S.
- Listed height: 5 ft 10 in (1.78 m)
- Listed weight: 195 lb (88 kg)

Career information
- High school: Bowdon (GA)
- College: Kennesaw State
- NFL draft: 2019: undrafted

Career history
- New Orleans Saints (2019)*; Dallas Renegades (2020)*; Team 9 (2020)*; Philadelphia Stars (2022–2023); Bay Area Panthers (2024)
- * Offseason or practice squad member only

Career USFL statistics
- Games played: 5
- Rush attempts: 24
- Rushing yards: 130
- Touchdowns: 2

Darnell Holland (born November 6, 1996) is an American former football running back for the Bay Area Panthers of the Indoor Football League (IFL). He played college football at Kennesaw State. He played for the Philadelphia Stars of the United States Football League (USFL) from 2022 to 2023.

== Early life and education ==
Holland was born on November 6, 1996, in Bowdon, Georgia. He attended Bowdon High School where he was a two-sport athlete, in football and basketball. As a senior in football, he made 2,123 all-purpose yards and scored 29 touchdowns.

Holland committed to Kennesaw State University where he was a member of their first football team in 2015. As a freshman, he played in all 11 games and was a starter in three. He placed fourth on the roster with 343 rushing yards on 38 carries, an average of 9.0 yards-per-carry. As a sophomore, he started ten of eleven games and made 46 rushes for three touchdowns. In his junior year, Holland started 13 games at running back and ended the year with eight offensive scores. He ran for 727 yards and was seventh in the conference for scoring with 48 total points.

Holland had his best season as a senior, rushing for 949 yards on just 80 carries, an average of 11.9 yards per rush.

== Professional career ==
After going unselected in the 2019 NFL draft, Holland was signed as an undrafted free agent by the New Orleans Saints. He was waived on May 13.

Holland was selected in the 2020 XFL draft by the Dallas Renegades but was waived on January 22.

Holland was later signed to the XFL's practice squad team, referred to as Team 9, on January 30. He had his contract terminated when the league suspended operations on April 10, 2020.

From 2020 to 2021, Holland played for the Generals of The Spring League, winning the league championship in his first season with the team.

Holland was selected in the 27th round of the 2022 USFL draft by the Philadelphia Stars. In his first game with the team he recorded nine carries for 52 yards and scored one touchdown in a loss to the New Orleans Breakers. He suffered a hamstring injury and was transferred to the team's inactive roster on April 30. He was moved back to the active roster on May 14.

Holland was placed on the injured reserve list by the team on April 8, 2023, and moved to the inactive roster on May 16. He was released on June 13, 2023.

=== Statistics ===
USFL statistics
Year	Team	Games		Rushing					Receiving					Return yards					Fumbles	
Year	Team	GP	GS	Att	Yds	Avg	Lng	TD	Rec	Yds	Avg	Lng	TD	Att	Yds	Avg	Lng	TD	Fum	Lost
2022	PHI	5	1	24	130	5.4	42	2	8	26	3.3	8	0	5	132	26.4	62	0	3	1
Career		5	1	24	130	5.4	42	2	8	26	3.3	8	0	5	132	26.4	62	0	3	1
