= Justin Sumpter =

American gridiron football player (born 1996)

No. 85
- Position: Wide receiver

Personal information
- Born: May 22, 1996 (age 30); Austell, Georgia, U.S.
- Listed height: 6 ft 4 in (1.93 m)
- Listed weight: 217 lb (98 kg)

Career information
- High school: Sandy Creek (Tyrone, Georgia)
- College: Kennesaw State
- NFL draft: 2019: undrafted

Career history
- Los Angeles Rams (2019)*; Hamilton Tiger-Cats (2019–2021)*
- * Offseason or practice squad member only

Justin Sumpter (born May 22, 1996) is an American former professional football wide receiver. He played college football for the Kennesaw State Owls.

== Early life ==
Sumpter caught 27 passes for 423 yards and four touchdowns his senior year at Sandy Creek High School in Tyrone, Georgia. In addition to football, Sumpter lettered in basketball and track and field.

== College career ==
Sumpter led the Owls in receptions in each of his four seasons, and was named first-team All-Big South wide receiver following his sophomore, junior and senior years.

His one-handed catch against Liberty in 2017 was featured as ESPN's top play of that week.

Sumpter was invited to and participated in the 2019 College Gridiron Showcase college football all-star event.

== Professional career ==
After going undrafted in the 2019 NFL draft, Sumpter was signed by the Los Angeles Rams as an undrafted free agent.

Sumpter signed with the Hamilton Tiger-Cats of the CFL on May 22, 2019. He retired from football on June 28, 2021.
