= 2024 Kennesaw State Owls football team =

American college football season

2024 Kennesaw State Owls football
- Conference: Conference USA
- Record: 2–10 (2–6 C-USA)
- Head coach: Brian Bohannon (10th season; first 9 games); Chandler Burks (interim; remainder of season)
- Co-offensive coordinators: Chandler Burks (1st season); Stewart Cook (1st season)
- Offensive scheme: Pistol
- Defensive coordinator: Greg Harris (1st season)
- Base defense: 4–2–5
- Home stadium: Fifth Third Stadium

2024 Conference USA football standings
	Conf.			Overall
Team	W		L	W		L
Jacksonville State y$	7	–	1	9	–	5
Western Kentucky y	6	–	2	8	–	6
Sam Houston	6	–	2	10	–	3
Liberty	5	–	3	8	–	4
Louisiana Tech	4	–	4	5	–	8
UTEP	3	–	5	3	–	9
FIU	3	–	5	4	–	8
New Mexico State	2	–	6	3	–	9
Middle Tennessee	2	–	6	3	–	9
Kennesaw State*	2	–	6	2	–	10
Championship: Jacksonville State 52, Western Kentucky 12
$ – Conference champion; y – Championship game participant; * – Ineligible for postseason play due to FCS-to-FBS transition rules

The 2024 Kennesaw State Owls football team represented Kennesaw State University in Conference USA (C-USA) during the 2024 NCAA Division I FBS football season. The Owls were led by Brian Bohannon in his tenth year as the head coach. The Owls played home games at Fifth Third Stadium, located in Kennesaw, Georgia.

The 2024 season was Kennesaw State's first year in Conference USA since transitioning from the NCAA Division I Football Championship Subdivision (FCS).

== Offseason ==
=== Transfers ===
==== Outgoing ====
Player	Position	Destination
Andre Craig	WR	Alabama
Chance Gamble	CB	Georgia Southern
Deontre Morris	S	Georgia Southern
Carlos Allen Jr.	DL	Houston
Christopher Cain	IOL	Unknown

==== Incoming ====
Player	Position	Previous School
Mason Bowers	IOL	Coastal Carolina
Austin Welch	PK	Eastern Kentucky
Tylon Dunlap	DE	Georgia State
Earl Woods III	QB	Jacksonville State
Qway McCoy	S	Louisiana-Monroe
Destun Thomas	WR	Memphis
Jacob Kettels	OT	Montana State
Donovan Westmoreland	DE	South Carolina
Jackson Manning	TE	UMass
Christopher Townsel	CB	USF
Christian Moss	WR	Virginia Tech

== Preseason ==
=== C-USA media poll ===
The Conference USA preseason media poll was released on July 19. The Owls were predicted to last out of ten teams in the conference.

== Schedule ==
Date	Time	Opponent	Site	TV	Result	Attendance
August 31	3:30 p.m.	at UTSA*	Alamodome; San Antonio, TX	ESPN+	L 16–28	25,911
September 7	7:00 p.m.	Louisiana*	Fifth Third Bank Stadium; Kennesaw, GA	ESPN+	L 10–34	11,040
September 14	7:00 p.m.	at San Jose State*	CEFCU Stadium; San Jose, CA	TruTV	L 10–31	11,090
September 28	6:00 p.m.	UT Martin*^{†}	Fifth Third Bank Stadium; Kennesaw, GA	ESPN+	L 13–24	10,847
October 4	7:00 p.m.	Jacksonville State	Fifth Third Bank Stadium; Kennesaw, GA	CBSSN	L 24–63	10,029
October 15	8:00 p.m.	at Middle Tennessee	Johnny "Red" Floyd Stadium; Murfreesboro, TN	CBSSN	L 5–14	10,200
October 23	7:00 p.m.	Liberty	Fifth Third Bank Stadium; Kennesaw, GA	CBSSN	W 27–24	8,209
October 30	7:30 p.m.	at Western Kentucky	Houchens Industries–L. T. Smith Stadium; Bowling Green, KY	ESPN2	L 14–31	14,547
November 9	4:00 p.m.	at UTEP	Sun Bowl; El Paso, TX	ESPN+	L 35–43 ^{2OT}	14,728
November 16	3:00 p.m.	Sam Houston	Fifth Third Bank Stadium; Kennesaw, GA	ESPN+	L 17–23 ^{OT}	7,736
November 23	3:00 p.m.	FIU	Fifth Third Bank Stadium; Kennesaw, GA	ESPN+	W 27–26	6,210
November 30	3:00 p.m.	at Louisiana Tech	Joe Aillet Stadium; Ruston, LA	ESPN+	L 0–33	14,686
*Non-conference game; ^{†}Homecoming; All times are in Eastern time

== Roster ==
2024 Kennesaw State Owls football team roster
Players
Coaches
Offense

Pos.	#	Name	Class
RB	0	Michael Benefield	Sr
WR	1	Gabriel Benyard	Jr
TE	2	Preston Daniels	Sr
RB	3	Alexander Diggs	So
QB	4	Khalib Johnson	So
WR	5	Blake Bohannon	Jr
WR	6	Christian Moss	Jr
WR	8	Tykeem Wallace	Jr
QB	9	Davis Bryson	So
QB	10	Earl Woods III	Fr
QB	11	Preston Clemmer	Fr
QB	12	Braden Bohannon	So
WR	16	Destun Thomas	So
QB	17	Lucas Scheerhorn	Fr
WR	19	Javon Rogers	Fr
RB	24	Yesiah Clemons	Sr
TE	25	Jackson Manning	Jr
RB	26	Kenai Grier	Fr
WR	28	David Cole	Fr
RB	30	Qua Ashley	So
RB	32	DJ Scott	Fr
RB	33	Rob Brown	So
TE	36	Corey Gardhigh	Fr
WR	38	Josh Williamson	So
TE	40	Ty Brewer	Fr
TE	42	Isaiah Williams	Fr
OL	51	William Johnson	So
OL	53	Kalari Gordon	Fr
OL	54	Kaleb May	Fr
OL	55	Seaburn Hines	Jr
OL	56	Trey Butts	So
OL	57	Mason Bowers	Jr
OL	59	Jacob Norcross	Fr
OL	63	Jose Balver-Mendoza	Fr
OL	64	Isaac Cannizzaro	Fr
OL	65	JT Pennington	Jr
OL	66	Zacchaeus Williams	Jr
OL	67	Jarvis Adams	Fr
OL	68	Benton Dunn	Fr
OL	70	Chevy Trask	Jr
OL	71	Nate Wright	So
OL	72	Ethan Newman	Fr
OL	73	Jacob Kettels	Jr
OL	74	Havik Pettigrew	So
OL	76	Brian Habeck	So
OL	77	Kevin Smith	Fr
OL	78	Benjamin Kienz	Fr
OL	79	Dylan Hannon	So
TE	80	Connor Finer	Jr
WR	81	Bryce Dopson	Fr
WR	82	Navelle Dean	Fr
TE	84	Gatlin Hancock	Fr
TE	85	Rowan Darnell	So
TE	86	Carson Kent	So
WR	87	Dennis Sims	Fr
WR	88	Jaden Robinson	Fr
TE	89	Ian Pederson	Fr

Defense

Pos.	#	Name	Class
LB	7	Garland Benyard	Jr
DB	11	Sidney Porter	Jr
LB	14	Jalen Barnum	Sr
DB	15	Jayven Williams	So
DB	17	Jasec Smith	Fr
DB	18	Nick Sawyer	So
DB	20	Tyler Hallum	Jr
DB	21	JeRico Washington Jr.	Fr
DB	22	Markell Redding	Fr
DB	23	Isaac Paul	Fr
DB	25	Que Billingsley	Fr
DB	27	Five Hamilton	Fr
DB	29	Milon Jones	Jr
DB	30	Andrew Douglas	Jr
DB	31	Sulaiman Bah	Jr
DB	31	James Ziglor	Jr
DB	33	Austin White	Sr
DB	34	Chris Townsel	Sr
DB	36	Devin Ross	Fr
DB	37	Terrence Curtis	Fr
LB	38	Jaiden Kimble	Fr
LB	39	Eli Leiataua	Jr
DB	40	Jonathan Mathis	Fr
LB	41	Brandon Miller	Fr
OLB	42	Morgan Pearson	So
OLB	42	Brendan Gant	Fr
OLB	43	Jamar Rucks	Jr
LB	44	Baron Hopson	Jr
OLB	45	CJ Donaldson	Fr
LB	46	Tywon Christopher	Fr
LB	47	Deldrick Franklin	Fr
LB	48	Donelius Johnson	So
OLB	49	Juandarion Silas	So
DL	50	Tylon Dunlap	Jr
DL	51	Jaxon Colvin	Fr
LB	52	Trey Hargrove	Fr
DL	53	AJ Miller	Fr
OLB	54	Alto Moore	Fr
LB	55	Nehemiah Pgouda	Fr
LB	56	Joshua Pgouda	Fr
DL	58	Jahon Myers	Jr
DL	59	Nicholas Charles	So
DL	60	Jaiden Grimes	Fr
DL	74	Tyler Hoffman	Fr
DL	79	Marlo East Jr.	Fr
DL	90	Ugonna Nwoha	So
DL	92	Tyler Scott	Jr
DL	93	Jaylan Jarrett	Fr
DL	94	Jordan Miles	Jr
LB	95	Ramontei Dardy	Fr
DL	96	Donovan Westmoreland	So
DL	97	Adam Watkins	Jr
OLB	98	RJ Taylor	So
DL	99	Thomarius Walker	Jr

Special teams

Pos.	#	Name	Class
LS	58	Ben Blanton	Fr
LS	69	Bryce Robinson	So
P	83	Jacob Ulrich	Fr
P	91	Joshua Huiet	Jr
K	96	Britton Williams	Jr
K	98	Erik Calvillo	Fr
K	99	Austin Welch	Jr

Head coach

- Brian Bohannon

Coordinators/assistant coaches

- Greg Harris – Defensive coordinator/Outside linebackers
- Chandler Burks – Co-Offensive coordinator/Quarterbacks
- Stewart Cook – Co-Offensive coordinator/Tight ends
- Ossie Buchannon – Wide receivers/Special teams coordinator
- Liam Klein – Inside linebackers/Recruiting coordinator
- Cameron Norcross – Offensive line/Run game coordinator
- Tim Glanton – Running backs
- Mike Pelton – Defensive linemen
- Ray Smith – Cornerbacks
- Jireh Wilson – Safeties
- Jake Lassiter – Graduate assistant
- Carson Koporc – Graduate assistant
- Darron Paschal – Graduate assistant
- Malik Slater – Graduate assistant

Legend

- (C) Team captain
- (S) Suspended
- (I) Ineligible
- Injured
- Redshirt

Roster
Last update: 9/30/24

== Game summaries ==
=== at UTSA ===
Kennesaw State Owls (0–0) vs UTSA Roadrunners (0–0) – Game summary

Quarter	1	2	3	4	Total
Owls	3	3	3	7	16
Roadrunners	14	7	0	7	28

at Alamodome • San Antonio, Texas

- Date: August 31st
- Game time: 3:30 p.m. EDT
- Game weather: None (played indoors)
- Game attendance: 25,911
- Referee: Gary Leeper
- TV announcers (ESPN+): Jack Benjamin (play-by-play) and LaDarrin McLane (analyst)

Game information

First quarter

- (12:00) UTSA – Devin McCuin 2 yard pass from Owen McCown, Chase Allen kick (Drive: 8 plays, 53 yards, 2:55; UTSA 7–0)
- (6:12) KENN – Austin Welch 48 yard field goal (Drive: 12 plays, 44 yards, 5:48; UTSA 7–3)
- (1:13) UTSA – Owen McCown 5 yard run, Chase Allen kick (Drive: 11 plays, 75 yards, 4:59; UTSA 14–3)

Second quarter

- (10:40) UTSA – Devin McCuin 4 yard pass from Owen McCown, Chase Allen kick (Drive: 8 plays, 80 yards, 4:11; UTSA 21–3)
- (0:59) KENN – Austin Welch 34 yard field goal (Drive: 7 plays, 48 yards, 1:41; UTSA 21–6)

Third quarter

- (2:06) KENN – Austin Welch 31 yard field goal (Drive: 12 plays, 74 yards, 7:21; UTSA 21–9)

Fourth quarter

- (9:23) KENN – Carson Kent 25 yard pass from Davis Bryson, Austin Welch kick (Drive: 6 plays, 55 yards, 3:07; UTSA 21–16)
- (3:52) UTSA – Oscar Cardenas 3 yard pass from Owen McCown, Chase Allen kick (Drive: 9 plays, 44 yards, 3:44; UTSA 28–16)

Statistics	KENN	UTSA
First downs	15	17
Total yards	253	416
Rushing yards	51	76
Passing yards	202	340
Passing: comp–att–int	14–28–0	28–38–0
Time of possession	29:00	31:00

Team	Category	Player	Statistics
Kennesaw State	Passing	Davis Bryson	14/28, 202 yards, 1 TD
Kennesaw State	Rushing	Qua Ashley	10 carries, 26 yards
Kennesaw State	Receiving	Qua Ashley	1 reception, 51 yards
UTSA	Passing	Owen McCown	28/38, 340 yards, 3 TD
UTSA	Rushing	Robert Henry	6 carries, 30 yards
UTSA	Receiving	Devin McCuin	11 receptions, 79 yards, 2 TD

=== vs Louisiana ===
Louisiana Ragin Cajuns (1–0) vs Kennesaw State Owls (0–1) – Game summary

Quarter	1	2	3	4	Total
Ragin Cajuns	0	20	14	0	34
Owls	7	0	0	3	10

at Fifth Third Bank Stadium • Kennesaw, Georgia

- Date: September 7th
- Game time: 7:00 p.m. EDT
- Game weather: Sunny, 78 °F (26 °C)
- Game attendance: 11,040
- Referee: Marshall Lewis
- TV announcers (ESPN+): Jay Walker (play-by-play), Cody Junot (analyst) and Dawson Eiserloh (sideline)

Game information

First quarter

- (6:19) KENN – Preston Daniels 3 yard run, Austin Welch kick (Drive: 16 plays, 74 yards, 8:32; KENN 0–7)

Second quarter

- (13:55) UL – Kenneth Almendares 30 yard field goal (Drive: 13 plays, 74 yards, 7:15; KENN 3–7)
- (6:02) UL – Elijah Davis 1 yard run, Kenneth Almendares kick (Drive: 10 plays, 80 yards, 4:47; UL 10–7)
- (1:54) UL – Zylan Perry 19 yard run, Kenneth Almendares kick (Drive: 4 plays, 85 yards, 1:26; UL 17–7)
- (0:00) UL – Kenneth Almendares 26 yard field goal (Drive: 3 plays, 1 yard, 0:21; UL 20–7)

Third quarter

- (9:02) UL – Robert Williams 3 yard pass from Ben Wooldridge, Kenneth Almendares kick (Drive: 5 plays, 71 yards, 2:44; UL 27–7)
- (0:49) UL – Elijah Davis 1 yard run, Kenneth Almendares kick (Drive: 10 plays, 79 yards, 6:03; UL 34–7)

Fourth quarter

- (7:30) KENN – Austin Welch 30 yard field goal (Drive: 14 plays, 63 yards, 8:12; UL 34–10)

Statistics	ULL	KENN
First downs	21	12
Total yards	454	204
Rushing yards	257	111
Passing yards	197	93
Passing: comp–att–int	17-22-0	7-13-0
Time of possession	32:04	27:56

Team	Category	Player	Statistics
Louisiana	Passing	Ben Wooldridge	15/19, 189 yards, 1 TD
Louisiana	Rushing	Zylan Perry	10 carries, 10 yards, 1 TD
Louisiana	Receiving	Jacob Bernard	4 receptions, 84 yards
Kennesaw State	Passing	Davis Bryson	7/13, 93 yards
Kennesaw State	Rushing	Michael Benefield	9 carries, 31 yards
Kennesaw State	Receiving	Tykeem Wallace	2 receptions, 34 yards

=== at San Jose State ===
Kennesaw State Owls (0–2) vs San Jose State Spartans (2–0) – Game summary

Quarter	1	2	3	4	Total
Owls	3	0	7	0	10
Spartans	0	17	7	7	31

at CEFCU Stadium • San Jose, CA

- Date: September 14, 2024
- Game time: 7:00 p.m. EDT
- Game weather: Sunny, 79 °F (26 °C)
- Game attendance: 11,090
- Referee: Michael Cuttone
- TV announcers (TruTV): Ari Wolfe (play-by-play) and Darius Walker (analyst)

Game information

First quarter

- (8:38) KENN – Austin Welch 32 yard field goal (Drive: 11 plays, 27 yards, 6:08; KENN 3–0)

Second quarter

- (14:30) SJSU – Nick Nash 24 yard pass from Emmett Brown, Kyler Halvorsen kick (Drive: 8 plays, 77 yards, 2:59; SJSU 7–3)
- (10:38) SJSU – Kyler Halvorsen 28 yard field goal (Drive: 5 plays, 50 yards, 1:41; SJSU 10–3)
- (0:15) SJSU – Nick Nash 3 yard pass from Emmett Brown, Kyler Halvorsen kick (Drive: 11 plays, 82 yards, 4:20; SJSU 17–3)

Third quarter

- (5:14) KENN – Preston Daniels 1 yard run, Austin Welch kick (Drive: 18 plays, 75 yards, 9:46; SJSU 17–10)
- (4:31) SJSU – Justin Lockhart 35 yard pass from Emmett Brown, Kyler Halvorsen kick (Drive: 2 plays, 55 yards, 0:35; SJSU 24–10)

Fourth quarter

- (3:07) SJSU – Nick Nash 9 yard pass from Emmett Brown, Kyler Halvorsen kick (Drive: 4 plays, 22 yards, 1:13; SJSU 31–10)

Statistics	KENN	SJSU
First downs	10	18
Total yards	192	417
Rushing yards	64	62
Passing yards	128	355
Passing: Comp–Att–Int	14–25–2	26–39–0
Time of possession	33:50	26:10

Team	Category	Player	Statistics
Kennesaw State	Passing	Davis Bryson	14/22, 128 yards, 1 INT
Kennesaw State	Rushing	Michael Benefield	12 carries, 33 yards
Kennesaw State	Receiving	Qua Ashley	4 receptions, 51 yards
San Jose State	Passing	Emmett Brown	26/38, 355 yards, 4 TD
San Jose State	Rushing	Jabari Bates	11 carries, 61 yards
San Jose State	Receiving	Nick Nash	17 receptions, 225 yards, 3 TD

=== vs UT Martin (FCS) ===
Kennesaw State Owls (0–3) vs UT Martin Skyhawks (FCS) (1–2) – Game summary

Quarter	1	2	3	4	Total
Skyhawks (FCS)	0	10	14	0	24
Owls	0	10	0	3	13

at Fifth Third Stadium • Kennesaw, GA

- Date: September 28th
- Game time: 6:00 p.m. EDT
- Game weather: Cloudy, 72 °F (22 °C)
- Game attendance: 10,847
- Referee: Rodney Burnette
- TV announcers (ESPN+): Stan Lewter (play-by-play), Nolan Alexander (analyst) and Jade Barkett (sideline)

Game information

First quarter

No scoring plays

Second quarter

- (14:50) UTM – Patrick Smith 7 yard run, Jaren Van Winkle kick (Drive: 15 plays, 68 yards, 7:29; UTM 7–0)
- (8:28) KENN – Jayven Williams 48 yard interception return, Austin Welch kick (Drive: 2 plays, 19 yards, 0:40; TIE 7–7)
- (0:59) UTM – Jaren Van Winkle 24 yard field goal (Drive: 6 plays, 62 yards, 1:05; UTM 10–7)
- (0:00) KENN – Austin Welch 49 yard field goal (Drive: 10 plays, 38 yards, 0:53; TIE 10–10)

Third quarter

- (10:13) UTM – Oshae Baker 63 yard interception return, Jaren Van Winkle kick (Drive: 9 plays, 33 yards, 4:47; UTM 17–10)
- (1:40) UTM – Patrick Smith 21 yard run, Jaren Van Winkle kick (Drive: 11 plays, 72 yards, 6:50; UTM 24–10)

Fourth quarter

- (11:07) KENN – Austin Welch 38 yard field goal (Drive: 11 plays, 52 yards, 5:27; UTM 24–13)

Statistics	UTM	KENN
First downs	16	13
Total yards	292	215
Rushing yards	160	66
Passing yards	132	149
Passing: Comp–Att–Int	13–23–1	17–35–2
Time of possession	31:11	28:49

Team	Category	Player	Statistics
UT Martin	Passing	Kinkead Dent	13/23, 132 yards, 1 INT
UT Martin	Rushing	Patrick Smith	24 carries, 123 yards, 2 TD
UT Martin	Receiving	Tyler Dostin	3 receptions, 41 yards
Kennesaw State	Passing	Davis Bryson	16/34, 132 yards, 2 INT
Kennesaw State	Rushing	Davis Bryson	6 carries, 27 yards
Kennesaw State	Receiving	Blake Bohannon	4 receptions, 54 yards

=== vs Jacksonville State ===
Kennesaw State Owls (0–4) vs Jacksonville State Gamecocks (1–3) – Game summary

Quarter	1	2	3	4	Total
Gamecocks	7	14	21	21	63
Owls	3	14	0	7	24

at Fifth Third Stadium • Kennesaw, GA

- Date: October 4th
- Game time: 7:00 p.m. EDT
- Game weather: Cloudy • Temperature: 74 °F (23 °C)
- Game attendance: 10,029
- Referee: Rory Bernard
- TV announcers (CBSSN): Dave Ryan (play-by-play) and Logan Ryan (analyst)

Game information

First quarter

- (10:54) JVST – Tre Stewart 1-yard run, Garrison Rippa kick (Drive: 6 plays, 59 yards, 2:25; JVST 7–0)
- (3:57) KENN – Austin Welch 25-yard field goal (Drive: 13 plays, 62 yards, 6:50; JVST 7–3)

Second quarter

- (11:23) JVST – Tyler Huff 6-yard run, Garrison Rippa kick (Drive: 8 plays, 50 yards, 2:06; JVST 14–3)
- (7:08) JVST – Tre Stewart 9-yard run, Garrison Rippa kick (Drive: 6 plays, 78 yards, 1:46; JVST 21–3)
- (6:56) KENN – Qua Ashley 93-yard kickoff return, Austin Welch kick (JVST 21–10)
- (1:49) KENN – Carson Kent 7-yard pass from Davis Bryson, Austin Welch kick (Drive: 10 plays, 67 yards, 3:48; JVST 21–17)

Third quarter

- (10:56) JVST – Tyler Huff 14-yard run, Garrison Rippa kick (Drive: 11 plays, 75 yards, 4:04; JVST 28–17)
- (6:14) JVST – Tre Stewart 1-yard run, Garrison Rippa kick (Drive: 3 plays, 65 yards, 0:47; JVST 35–17)
- (0:23) JVST – Tyler Huff 19-yard run, Garrison Rippa kick (Drive: 9 plays, 68 yards, 3:59; JVST 42–17)

Fourth quarter

- (14:08) JVST – Jabari Mack 0-yard interception, Garrison Rippa kick (JVST 49–17)
- (12:29) KENN – Michael Benefield 1-yard run, Austin Welch kick (Drive: 4 plays, 68 yards, 1:35; JVST 49–24)
- (7:28) JVST – Tre Stewart 1-yard run, Garrison Rippa kick (Drive: 9 plays, 75 yards, 5:01; JVST 56–24)
- (1:22) JVST – Mike Franklin 23-yard run, Garrison Rippa kick (Drive: 5 plays, 42 yards, 2:56; JVST 63–24)

Statistics	JVST	KENN
First downs	31	13
Total yards	577	270
Rushing yards	384	189
Passing yards	193	81
Passing: Comp–Att–Int	16–25–0	7–16–3
Time of possession	28:38	31:22

Team	Category	Player	Statistics
Jacksonville State	Passing	Tyler Huff	16/25, 193 yards
Jacksonville State	Rushing	Tyler Huff	15 carries, 176 yards, 3 TD
Jacksonville State	Receiving	Cam Vaughn	7 receptions, 96 yards
Kennesaw State	Passing	Davis Bryson	6/14, 76 yards, TD, 3 INT
Kennesaw State	Rushing	Michael Benefield	17 carries, 112 yards, TD
Kennesaw State	Receiving	Jaden Robinson	2 receptions, 36 yards

=== at Middle Tennessee ===
Kennesaw State Owls (0–5) at Middle Tennessee Blue Raiders (1–5) – Game summary

Quarter	1	2	3	4	Total
Owls	2	0	0	3	5
Blue Raiders	7	0	7	0	14

at Johnny "Red" Floyd Stadium • Murfreesboro, Tennessee

- Date: October 15th
- Game time: 8:00 p.m. EDT
- Game weather: Cloudy, 52 °F (11 °C)
- Game attendance: 10,200
- Referee: Garrett Dickerson
- TV announcers (CBSSN): Jordan Kent (play-by-play) and Logan Ryan (analyst)

Game information

First quarter

- (9:40) KENN – Team safety (Drive: 1 play, 0 yards, 0:40; KENN 2–0)
- (4:22) MTSU – Jekail Middlebrook 1 yard run, Zeke Rankin kick (Drive: 8 plays, 80 yards, 3:34; MTSU 7–2)

Second quarter

No scoring plays

Third quarter

- (5:09) MTSU – Omari Kelly 61 yard punt return, Zeke Rankin kick (Drive: 3 plays, 1 yards, 2:11; MTSU 14–2)

Fourth quarter

- (14:49) KENN – Austin Welch 37-yard field goal (Drive: 11 plays, 43 yards, 5:14; MTSU 14–5)

Statistics	KENN	MTSU
First downs	10	17
Total yards	234	284
Rushing yards	131	85
Passing yards	103	199
Passing: Comp–Att–Int	10–27–2	19–34–0
Time of possession	29:48	30:12

Team	Category	Player	Statistics
Kennesaw State	Passing	Khalib Johnson	5/17, 52 yards, 2 INT
Kennesaw State	Rushing	Qua Ashley	11 carries, 79 yards
Kennesaw State	Receiving	Carson Kent	4 receptions, 59 yards
Middle Tennessee	Passing	Nicholas Vattiato	19/34, 199 yards
Middle Tennessee	Rushing	Jaiden Credle	10 carries, 49 yards
Middle Tennessee	Receiving	Holden Willis	8 receptions, 92 yards

=== vs Liberty ===
Liberty Flames (5–0) at Kennesaw State Owls (0–6) – Game summary

Quarter	1	2	3	4	Total
Flames	7	7	3	7	24
Owls	7	7	7	6	27

at Fifth Third Stadium • Kennesaw, GA

- Date: October 23rd
- Game time: 7:00 p.m. EDT
- Game weather: Sunny • Temperature: 69 °F (21 °C) • Wind: SE 6 miles per hour (9.7 km/h)
- Game attendance: 8,209
- Referee: Reed Brotherton
- TV announcers (CBSSN): Jason Knapp (play-by-play) and Brock Vereen (analyst)

Game information

First quarter

- (5:43) LIB – Treon Sibley 15 yard pass from Kaidon Salter, Colin Karhu kick (Drive: 11 plays, 73 yards, 5:22; LIB 7–0)
- (2:49) KENN – Christian Moss 41 yard pass from Davis Bryson, Austin Welch kick (Drive: 6 plays, 75 yards, 2:54; TIE 7–7)

Second quarter

- (10:21) KENN – Michael Benefield 1 yard run, Austin Welch kick (Drive: 4 plays, 60 yards, 2:04; KENN 14–7)
- (0:48) LIB – Donte Lee Jr. 15 yard pass from Kaidon Salter, Colin Karhu kick (Drive: 12 plays, 81 yards, 2:12; TIE 14–14)

Third quarter

- (8:02) KENN – Qua Ashley 6 yard run, Austin Welch kick (Drive: 9 plays, 60 yards, 5:31; KENN 21–14)
- (5:05) LIB – Colin Karhu 47 yard field goal (Drive: 8 plays, 46 yards, 2:57; KENN 21–17)

Fourth quarter

- (11:43) KENN – Austin Welch 31 yard field goal (Drive: 14 plays, 62 yards, 0:00; KENN 24–17)
- (4:13) KENN – Austin Welch 41 yard field goal (Drive: 7 plays, 42 yards, 0:00; KENN 27–17)
- (1:49) LIB – Elijah Canion 0 yard pass from Kaidon Salter, Colin Karhu kick (Drive: 10 plays, 63 yards, 2:18; KENN 27–24)

Statistics	LIB	KENN
First downs	22	18
Total yards	386	323
Rushing yards	180	134
Passing yards	206	189
Passing: Comp–Att–Int	22–40–1	16–20–0
Time of possession	27:41	32:19

Team	Category	Player	Statistics
Liberty	Passing	Kaidon Salter	22/40, 206 yards, 3 TD, 1 INT
Liberty	Rushing	Kaidon Salter	9 carries, 87 yards
Liberty	Receiving	Elijah Canion	5 receptions, 61 yards, 1 TD
Kennesaw State	Passing	Davis Bryson	16/20, 189 yards, 1 TD
Kennesaw State	Rushing	Michael Benefield	16 carries, 54 yards, 1 TD
Kennesaw State	Receiving	Jaden Robinson	3 receptions, 72 yards

=== at Western Kentucky ===
Kennesaw State Owls (1–6) at Western Kentucky Hilltoppers (5–2) – Game summary

Quarter	1	2	3	4	Total
Owls	7	0	0	7	14
Hilltoppers	21	3	0	7	31

at Houchens Industries–L. T. Smith Stadium • Bowling Green, Kentucky

- Date: October 30th
- Game time: 6:30 p.m. EDT
- Game weather: Sunny
- Game attendance: 14,547
- Referee: Garrett Dickerson
- TV announcers (ESPN2): Clay Matvick (play-by-play) and Steve Addazio (analyst)

Game information

First quarter

- (11:54) WKU – Trevor Borland 5 yard pass from Caden Veltkamp, Lucas Carneiro kick (Drive: 8 plays, 79 yards, 3:01; WKU 7–0)
- (5:28) KENN – Michael Benefield 37 yard run, Austin Welch kick (Drive: 3 plays, 44 yards, 1:18; TIE 7–7)
- (3:16) WKU – Easton Messer 64 yard pass from Caden Veltkamp, Lucas Carneiro kick (Drive: 5 plays, 75 yards, 2:12; WKU 14–7)
- (0:00) WKU – George Hart III 30 yard run, Lucas Carneiro kick (Drive: 5 plays, 78 yards, 2:12; WKU 21–7)

Second quarter

- (3:46) WKU – Lucas Carneiro 32 yard field goal (Drive: 11 plays, 78 yards, 5:45; WKU 24–7)

Third quarter

No scoring plays

Fourth quarter

- (12:26) WKU – Noah Meyers 17 yard pass from Caden Veltkamp, Lucas Carneiro kick (Drive: 5 plays, 81 yards, 0:47; WKU 31–7)
- (5:19) KENN – Davis Bryson 20 yard run, Austin Welch kick (Drive: 14 plays, 82 yards, 2:13; WKU 31–14)

Statistics	KENN	WKU
First downs	18	24
Total yards	272	467
Rushing yards	176	191
Passing yards	96	276
Passing: Comp–Att–Int	13–26–1	17–22–0
Time of possession	32:54	27:06

Team	Category	Player	Statistics
Kennesaw State	Passing	Davis Bryson	13/26, 96 yards, 1 INT
Kennesaw State	Rushing	Michael Benefield	16 carries, 98 yards, 1 TD
Kennesaw State	Receiving	Carson Kent	3 receptions, 34 yards
Western Kentucky	Passing	Caden Veltkamp	17/22, 276 yards, 3 TD
Western Kentucky	Rushing	Elijah Young	15 carries, 114 yards
Western Kentucky	Receiving	Easton Messer	2 receptions, 68 yards, 1 TD

=== at UTEP ===
Kennesaw State Owls (1–7) at UTEP Miners (1–7) – Game summary

Quarter	1	2	3	4	OT	2OT	Total
Owls	7	0	14	7	7	0	35
Miners	7	7	7	7	7	8	43

at Sun Bowl • El Paso, Texas

- Date: November 9th
- Game time: 4:00 p.m. EDT
- Game weather: Sunny, 62 °F (17 °C)
- Game attendance: 14,728
- Referee: Ron Hudson
- TV announcers (ESPN+): Andy Morgan (play-by-play) and Ed Stansbury (analyst)

Game information

First quarter

- (7:00) UTEP – Kenny Odom 32 yard pass from Skyler Locklear, Buzz Flabiano kick (Drive: 8 plays, 89 yards, 3:55; UTEP 7–0)
- (6:47) KENN – Qua Ashley 97 yard kickoff return, Austin Welch kick (TIE 7–7)

Second quarter

- (1:56) UTEP – Marcus Vinson 11 yard pass from Skyler Locklear, Buzz Flabiano kick (Drive: 3 plays, 14 yards, 0:49; UTEP 14–7)

Third quarter

- (14:12) KENN – Christian Moss 60 yard pass from Davis Bryson (Drive: 2 plays, 62 yards, 0:42; UTEP 14–13)
- (11:23) UTEP – Jevon Jackson 1 yard run, Buzz Flabiano kick (Drive: 8 plays, 75 yards, 2:49; UTEP 21–13)
- (0:25) KENN – Michael Benefield 5 yard run, Davis Bryson pass to Carson Kent for two-point conversion (Drive: 4 plays, 22 yards, 2:00; TIE 21–21)

Fourth quarter

- (11:10) UTEP – Shay Smith 3 yard run, Buzz Flabiano kick (Drive: 8 plays, 75 yards, 4:15; UTEP 28–21)
- (2:43) KENN – Davis Bryson 14 yard run, Austin Welch kick (Drive: 2 plays, 18 yards, 0:39; TIE 28–28)

First overtime

- KENN – Qua Ashley 25 yard pass from Davis Bryson, Austin Welch kick (Drive: 1 play, 25 yards; KENN 35–28)
- UTEP – Kenny Odom 2 yard pass from Skyler Locklear, Buzz Flabiano kick (Drive: 3 plays, 25 yards; TIE 35–35)

Second overtime

- UTEP – Kenny Odom 16 yard pass from Skyler, Skyler Locklear pass to Jevon Jackson for two-point conversion (Drive: 4 plays, 25 yards; UTEP 43–35)

Statistics	KENN	UTEP
First downs	14	22
Total yards	300	453
Rushing yards	117	120
Passing yards	183	333
Passing: Comp–Att–Int	14–25–2	29–34–0
Time of possession	27:18	32:42

Team	Category	Player	Statistics
Kennesaw State	Passing	Davis Bryson	14/25, 183 yards, 2 TD, 2 INT
Kennesaw State	Rushing	Davis Bryson	16 carries, 70 yards, 1 TD
Kennesaw State	Receiving	Christian Moss	1 reception, 60 yards, 1 TD
UTEP	Passing	Skyler Locklear	28/33, 327 yards, 4 TD
UTEP	Rushing	Jevon Jackson	26 carries, 68 yards, 1 TD
UTEP	Receiving	Trey Goodman	12 receptions, 150 yards

=== vs Sam Houston ===
Sam Houston Bearkats (7–2) vs. Kennesaw State Owls (1–8) – Game summary

Quarter	1	2	3	4	OT	Total
Bearkats	0	3	7	7	6	23
Owls	0	3	7	7	0	17

at Fifth Third Bank Stadium • Kennesaw, Georgia

- Date: November 16th
- Game time: 3:00 p.m. EDT
- Game weather: Sunny, 67 °F (19 °C)
- Game attendance: 7,736
- Referee: Douglas Mercer
- TV announcers (ESPN+): Nolan Alexander (play-by-play), Barclay Miller (analyst) and Lauren Hoffman (sideline)

Game information

First quarter

No scoring plays

Second quarter

- (10:17) KENN – Austin Welch 25 yard field goal (Drive: 13 plays, 83 yards, 10:27; KENN 3–0)
- (1:56) SHSU – Christian Pavon 29 yard field goal (Drive: 5 plays, 41 yards, 2:15; TIED 3–3)

Third quarter

- (9:27) SHSU – Hunter Watson 25 yard run, Christian Pavon kick (Drive: 13 plays, 75 yards, 5:26; SHSU 10–3)
- (3:01) KENN – Michael Benefield 1 yard run, Austin Welch kick (Drive: 2 plays, 7 yards, 0:38; TIED 10–10)

Fourth quarter

- (1:54) SHSU – Jay Ducker 17 yard run, Christian Pavon kick (Drive: 8 plays, 70 yards, 4:06; SHSU 17–10)
- (0:25) KENN – Carson Kent 9 yard pass from Davis Bryson, Austin Welch kick (Drive: 10 plays, 71 yards, 1:21; TIED 17–17)

Overtime

- SHSU – Hunter Watson 10 yard run (Drive: 3 plays, 25 yards; SHSU 23–17)

Statistics	SHSU	KENN
First downs	21	13
Total yards	382	243
Rushing yards	203	106
Passing yards	179	137
Passing: Comp–Att–Int	22–32–1	16–24–1
Time of possession	32:24	27:36

Team	Category	Player	Statistics
Sam Houston	Passing	Hunter Watson	22/32, 179 yds, 1 INT
Sam Houston	Rushing	Jay Ducker	18 carries, 111 yards, 1 TD
Sam Houston	Receiving	Simeon Evans	5 receptions, 64 yards
Kennesaw State	Passing	Davis Bryson	16/24, 137 yds, 1 TD, 1 INT
Kennesaw State	Rushing	Davis Bryson	12 carries, 46 yards
Kennesaw State	Receiving	Blake Bohannon	5 receptions, 55 yards

=== vs FIU ===
FIU Panthers (3–7) vs. Kennesaw State Owls (1–9) – Game summary

Quarter	1	2	3	4	Total
Panthers	0	20	6	0	26
Owls	3	14	0	10	27

at Fifth Third Bank Stadium • Kennesaw, Georgia

- Date: November 23rd
- Game time: 3:00 p.m. EDT
- Game weather: Sunny, 58 °F (14 °C)
- Game attendance: 6,210
- Referee: Rodney Burnette
- TV announcers (ESPN+): Nolan Alexander (play-by-play), Barclay Miller (analyst) and Maria Martin (sideline)

Game information

First quarter

- (12:13) KENN – Austin Welch 36 yard field goal (Drive: 5 plays, 46 yards, 2:40; KENN 3–0)

Second quarter

- (10:19) KENN – Davis Bryson 5 yard run, Austin Welch kick (Drive: 9 plays, 82 yards, 4:48; KENN 10–0)
- (6:54) FIU – Eric Rivers 18 yard pass from Keyone Jenkins (Drive: 5 plays, 75 yards, 3:25; KENN 10–6)
- (3:48) KENN – Preston Daniels 3 yard run, Austin Welch kick (Drive: 7 plays, 60 yards, 3:04; KENN 17–6)
- (2:18) FIU – Dean Patterson 20 yard pass from Keyone Jenkins, Robert Czeremcha kick (Drive: 3 plays, 71 yards, 1:24; KENN 17–13)
- (1:00) FIU – Eric Rivers 42 yard pass from Keyone Jenkins, Robert Czeremcha kick (Drive: 4 plays, 70 yards, 0:45; FIU 20–17)

Third quarter

- (11:23) FIU – Robert Czeremcha 36 yard field goal (Drive: 7 plays, 31 yards, 3:28; FIU 23–17)
- (9:10) FIU – Robert Czeremcha 34 yard field goal (Drive: 4 plays, 7 yards, 2:05; FIU 26–17)

Fourth quarter

- (5:59) KENN – Davis Bryson 19 yard run, Austin Welch kick (Drive: 3 plays, 51 yards, 1:15; FIU 26–24)
- (1:04) KENN – Austin Welch 19 yard field goal (Drive: 8 plays, 32 yards, 2:31; KENN 27–26)

Statistics	FIU	KENN
First downs	15	20
Total yards	400	358
Rushing yards	196	172
Passing yards	204	186
Passing: Comp–Att–Int	12–22–1	18–32–1
Time of possession	31:27	28:33

Team	Category	Player	Statistics
FIU	Passing	Keyone Jenkins	12/22, 204 yards, 3 TD, 1 INT
FIU	Rushing	Devonte Lyons	16 carries, 99 yards
FIU	Receiving	Eric Rivers	7 receptions, 125 yards, 2 TD
Kennesaw State	Passing	Davis Bryson	17/29, 185 yards
Kennesaw State	Rushing	Qua Ashley	14 carries, 61 yards
Kennesaw State	Receiving	Carson Kent	4 receptions, 56 yards

=== at Louisiana Tech ===
Kennesaw State Owls at Louisiana Tech Bulldogs – Game summary

Quarter	1	2	3	4	Total
Owls	0	0	0	0	0
Bulldogs	7	10	9	7	33

at Joe Aillet Stadium • Ruston, Louisiana

- Date: November 30
- Game time: 3:00 p.m. EST
- Game weather: Sunny, 56 °F (13 °C)
- Game attendance: 14,686
- Referee: Ron Hudson
- TV announcers (ESPN+): Lyn Rollins (play-by-play), Hek’ma Harrison (analyst) and Madison Kaufman (sideline)

Game information

First quarter

- (11:41) LT – Omiri Wiggins 4 yard run, Buck Buchanan kick (Drive: 5 plays, 26 yards, 1:59; LT 7–0)

Second quarter

- (14:16) LT – Omiri Wiggins 6 yard run, Buck Buchanan kick (Drive: 9 plays, 84 yards, 4:41; LT 14–0)
- (0:57) LT – Buck Buchanan 55 yard field goal (Drive: 9 plays, 37 yards, 3:36; LT 17–0)

Third quarter

- (2:04) LT – Team safety (Drive: 1 play, -1 yard, 0:04; LT 19–0)
- (0:07) LT – Omiri Wiggins 35 yard run, Buck Buchanan kick (Drive: 4 plays, 63 yards, 1:51; LT 26–0)

Fourth quarter

- (10:50) LT – Amani Givens 2 yard run, Buck Buchanan kick (Drive: 6 plays, 69 yards, 3:49; LT 33–0)

Statistics	KENN	LT
First downs	8	28
Total yards	146	443
Rushing yards	58	210
Passing yards	146	443
Passing: Comp–Att–Int	10–26–0	23–31–0
Time of possession	22:43	37:17

Team	Category	Player	Statistics
Kennesaw State	Passing	Davis Bryson	10/26, 88 yards
Kennesaw State	Rushing	Michael Benefield	9 carries, 36 yards
Kennesaw State	Receiving	Gabriel Benyard	4 receptions, 39 yards
Louisiana Tech	Passing	Evan Bullock	23/30, 233 yards
Louisiana Tech	Rushing	Omiri Wiggins	17 carries, 129 yards, 3 TD
Louisiana Tech	Receiving	Jimmy Holiday	7 receptions, 103 yards
