= Mike Kershaw =

Canadian football coach and executive (born 1976)

Current position
- Title: General manager
- Team: Kennesaw State
- Conference: CUSA

Biographical details
- Born: August 25, 1976 (age 50); Regina, Saskatchewan, Canada
- Education: Delta State University (2000, 2003)

Playing career
- 1997–1998: Delta State
- Position: Quarterback

Coaching career (HC unless noted)
- 1999–2000: Delta State (GA)
- 2001: Delta State (S)
- 2002–2006: Delta State (QB/WR)
- 2018: Rice (OA)
- 2019–2023: Rice (WR)
- 2024: Mississippi College

Administrative career (AD unless noted)
- 2025–present: Kennesaw State (GM)

Head coaching record
- Overall: 2–8

Michael Kershaw (born August 25, 1976) is a Canadian college football coach and executive who is the general manager of the Kennesaw State Owls. He was previously the head football coach for Mississippi College in 2024. He also coached for Delta State and Rice. He played college football for Delta State as a quarterback.

== Head coaching record ==
Year	Team	Overall	Conference	Standing	Bowl/playoffs
Mississippi College Choctaws (Gulf South Conference) (2024)
2024	Mississippi College	2–8	1–6	7th	
Mississippi College:		2–8	1–6		
Total:		2–8			
