= Brian Bohannon =

American football player and coach (born 1971)

Current position
- Title: Senior offensive assistant
- Team: Georgia Tech Yellow Jackets

Biographical details
- Born: December 17, 1970 (age 55); Macon, Georgia, U.S.

Playing career
- 1990–1993: Georgia
- Position: Wide receiver

Coaching career (HC unless noted)
- 1994–1995: West Georgia (AC)
- 1996: Gardner–Webb (WR)
- 1997–1999: Georgia Southern (WR)
- 2000–2001: Georgia Southern (DB)
- 2002–2007: Navy (WR)
- 2008–2012: Georgia Tech (QB/B-backs)
- 2013–2024: Kennesaw State
- 2025: Georgia Tech (AC)
- 2026: Georgia Tech (AHC)

Head coaching record
- Overall: 72–38
- Bowls: 5–4 (NCAA D-I playoffs)

Accomplishments and honors

Championships
- 3 Big South (2017–2018, 2021)

Awards
- 2× Big South Coach of the Year (2017–2018); AFCA FCS Reg. 2 Coach of the Year (2017) AFCA FCS National Coach of the Year (2017)

Brian Lloyd Bohannon (born December 17, 1970) is an American college football coach. He is a senior offensive assistant for Georgia Tech. He previously served as the head football coach for Kennesaw State University, a position he held since the inception of the program in 2013 until 2024. The Kennesaw State Owls began play in 2015.

== Early life ==
Born in Macon, Georgia, Bohannon later lived in places where his father worked as a high school football coach, in Athens from ages two to eight then in Griffin. Bohannon graduated from Griffin High School in 1989; he played football at Griffin under his father who was head coach.

Bohannon attended the University of Georgia, where he played at wide receiver for Georgia Bulldogs football from 1990 to 1993. Bohannon completed his bachelor's degree in general business from the Georgia Terry College of Business in 1993. In 1996, Bohannon completed a master's degree in business education at the University of West Georgia.

== Coaching career ==
=== Kennesaw State ===
On March 24, 2013, Bohannon was introduced as the first head coach of the Kennesaw State Owls football football team that started play as a member of the Big South Conference in the 2015 season. Prior to his time at Kennesaw State, Bohannon served as an assistant coach under Paul Johnson at Georgia Southern, Navy and Georgia Tech.

On November 10, 2024, Kennesaw State announced that Bohannon stepped down as the Owls head coach after a 1–8 start to the season and a 72–38 overall record. Chandler Burks succeeded him as interim head coach. Following the announcement of his departure, Bohannon announced on X (formerly Twitter) that he did not step down from his position but rather that he was informed by Kennesaw State athletic director, Milton Overton, that the Owls would be making a change in leadership earlier that morning.

Bohannon was hired as a senior offensive assistant at Georgia Tech for the 2025 season. As of October 11, 2026, he is listed on the Georgia Tech Athletic Staff Directory as the associate head coach.

== Head coaching record ==
Year	Team	Overall	Conference	Standing	Bowl/playoffs	STATS^{#}	FCS^{°}
Kennesaw State Owls (Big South Conference) (2015–2021)
2015	Kennesaw State	6–5	2–4	T–5th			
2016	Kennesaw State	8–3	3–2	T–3rd			
2017	Kennesaw State	12–2	5–0	1st	L NCAA Division I Quarterfinal	8	9
2018	Kennesaw State	11–2	5–0	1st	L NCAA Division I Quarterfinal	5	5
2019	Kennesaw State	11–3	5–1	2nd	L NCAA Division I Second Round	13	8
2020–21	Kennesaw State	4–1	2–1	2nd		17	15
2021	Kennesaw State	11–2	6–0	1st	L NCAA Division I Second Round	11	10
Kennesaw State Owls (ASUN Conference) (2022)
2022	Kennesaw State	5–6	1–4	5th			
Kennesaw State Owls (NCAA Division I FCS independent) (2023)
2023	Kennesaw State	3–6					
Kennesaw State Owls (Conference USA) (2024)
2024	Kennesaw State	1–8	1–4	(Note: Bohannon was fired after 9 games.)			
Kennesaw State:		72–38	30–16				
Total:		72–38					
National championship Conference title Conference division title or championship game berth
