= Travis Bell =

American football player (born 1998)

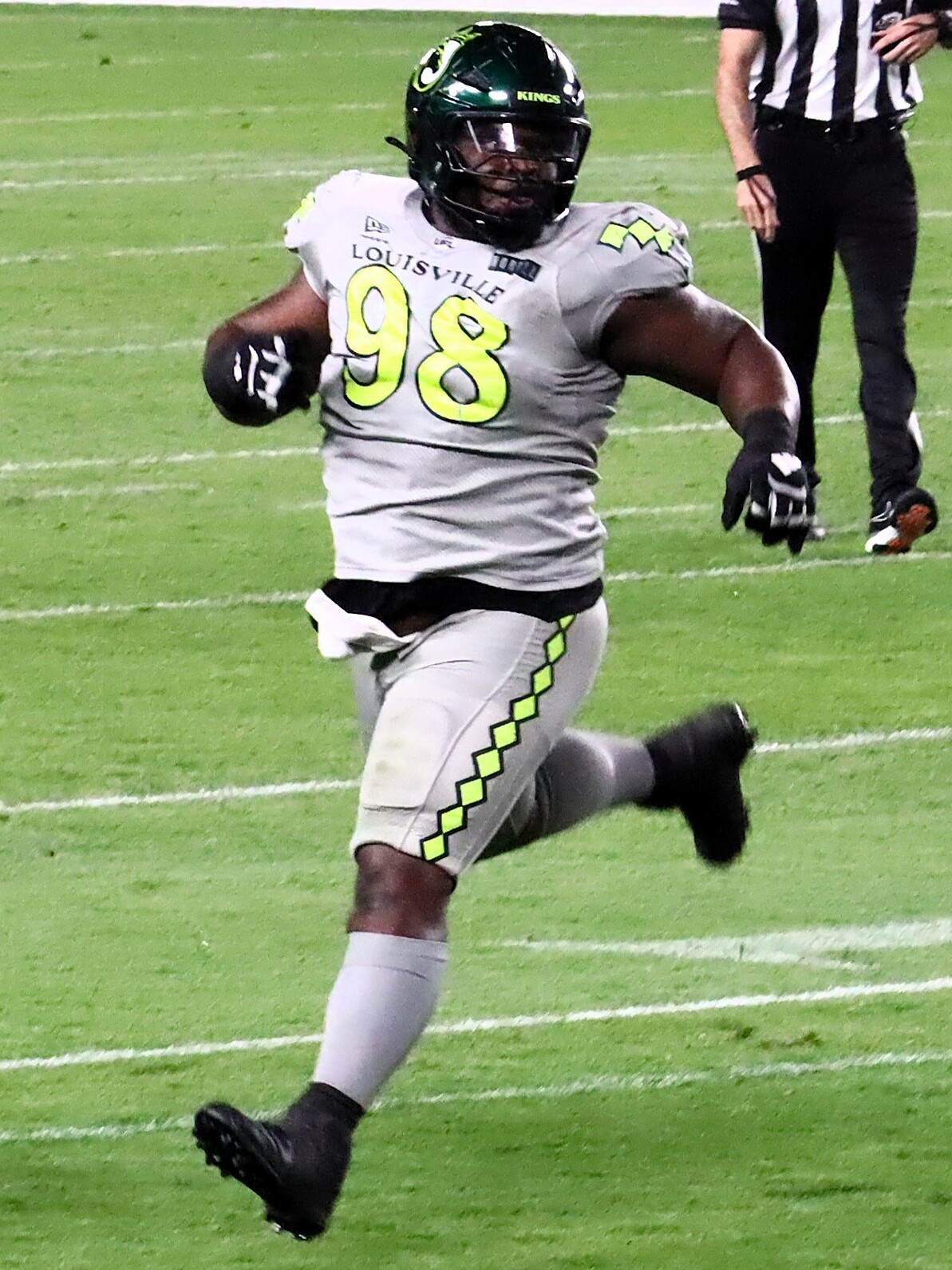
- Bell with the Louisville Kings in 2026

Profile
- Position: Nose tackle

Personal information
- Born: October 27, 1998 (age 28); Montgomery, Alabama, U.S.
- Listed height: 6 ft 0 in (1.83 m)
- Listed weight: 310 lb (141 kg)

Career information
- High school: Jefferson Davis (Montgomery)
- College: Kennesaw State (2018–2022)
- NFL draft: 2023: 7th round, 218th overall pick

Career history
- Chicago Bears (2023)*; Atlanta Falcons (2023); Cincinnati Bengals (2023); Chicago Bears (2024)*; Minnesota Vikings (2024)*; Louisville Kings (2026); Cleveland Browns (2026)*
- * Offseason or practice squad member only

Awards and highlights
- UFL champion (2026)

Career NFL statistics as of 2024
- Total tackles: 2
- Stats at Pro Football Reference

Travis Bell (born October 27, 1998) is an American professional football nose tackle. He played college football for the Kennesaw State Owls and was selected by the Chicago Bears in the seventh round of the 2023 NFL draft.

== Early life ==
Bell was born on October 27, 1998, and grew up in Montgomery, Alabama. He attended Jefferson Davis High School and was a four-year letter winner. He posted 20.0 sacks and 229 tackles across his four seasons at Jefferson Davis, including 80 tackles and 9.0 sacks in only eight games as a senior. Bell helped Jefferson Davis reach the playoffs in his final two years. Off the field, Bell posted a perfect 4.0 GPA in his last semester. A two-star recruit, he committed to play college football for the Kennesaw State Owls.

== College career ==
Bell saw immediate playing time at Kennesaw State and was a starter in his first season, compiling 24 tackles as a true freshman and helping them reach the NCAA Division I Football Championship Subdivision playoffs. The following season, he appeared in 13 games, eight of which he started, and helped them rank as the third-best team nationally in total defense while posting 30 tackles, 5.0 sacks and 9.0 tackles-for-loss. The 2020 season was postponed to spring 2021 due to the COVID-19 pandemic, and in it he appeared in four games with 11 stops, two tackles-for-loss and a half-sack.

Bell made 4.0 sacks and 6.0 tackles-for-loss in 2021, earning second-team All-Big South Conference honors. He returned for a final season in 2022, and recorded in 11 games 34 tackles, 5.5 tackles-for-loss, and 1.5 sacks. He finished his stint at Kennesaw State with 11 sacks and 24.5 tackles-for-loss in 54 games played.

== Professional career ==
=== Pre-draft ===
Pre-draft measurables
Height	Weight	Arm length	Hand span	Wingspan	40-yard dash	10-yard split	20-yard split	20-yard shuttle	Three-cone drill	Vertical jump	Broad jump	Bench press
6 ft 0 in (1.83 m)	310 lb (141 kg)	32 5/8 in (0.83 m)	10 in (0.25 m)	6 ft 4 7/8 in (1.95 m)	5.03 s	1.71 s	2.87 s	4.58 s	7.99 s	32.5 in (0.83 m)	9 ft 2 in (2.79 m)	30 reps
All values from Kennesaw State's Pro Day

Bell was not invited to the NFL Scouting Combine, and posted at his pro day 30 bench press reps.

=== Chicago Bears (first stint) ===
Bell was selected in the seventh round (218th overall) of the 2023 NFL draft by the Chicago Bears, becoming the first player in his school's history to be selected. He was waived on August 29, 2023, and re-signed to the practice squad.

=== Atlanta Falcons ===
On November 1, 2023, Bell was signed by the Atlanta Falcons off the Bears practice squad. He was released on December 19.

=== Cincinnati Bengals ===
On December 20, 2023, Bell was claimed off waivers by the Cincinnati Bengals.

Bell was waived by the Bengals during final roster cuts on August 27, 2024.

=== Chicago Bears (second stint) ===
On September 26, 2024, Bell signed with the Bears practice squad. He was released on October 15.

=== Minnesota Vikings ===
On November 6, 2024, Bell was signed to the Minnesota Vikings practice squad. He signed a reserve/future contract with Minnesota on January 16, 2025.

On August 24, 2025, Bell was waived by the Vikings.

=== Louisville Kings ===
On January 14, 2026, Bell was selected by the Louisville Kings of the United Football League (UFL).

=== Cleveland Browns ===
On August 3, 2026, Bell was signed by the Cleveland Browns. On August 30, he was waived by Cleveland as a part of final roster cuts with an injury designation.
