= 2023 Kennesaw State Owls football team =

American college football season

2023 Kennesaw State Owls football
- Conference: Independent
- Record: 3–6
- Head coach: Brian Bohannon (9th season)
- Offensive coordinator: Chris Klenakis (1st season)
- Offensive scheme: Pistol option
- Defensive coordinator: Nathan Burton (1st season)
- Base defense: 4–2–5
- Home stadium: Fifth Third Bank Stadium

2023 NCAA Division I FCS independents football standings
	Conf.			Overall
Team	W		L	W		L
Kennesaw State*		–		3	–	6
* Note: Kennesaw State ineligible for FCS postseason play due to start of transition to FBS.; Rankings from AP Poll

The 2023 Kennesaw State Owls football team represented the Kennesaw State University as a new independent during the 2023 NCAA Division I FCS football season. Led by ninth-year head coach Brian Bohannon, the Owls played their home games at the Fifth Third Bank Stadium in Kennesaw, Georgia.

The 2023 season was the last for the Owls on the FCS level as after the conclusion of the season they joined Conference USA in 2024.

== Schedule ==
Date	Time	Opponent	Site	TV	Result	Attendance
August 31	7:00 p.m.	Tusculum	Fifth Third Bank Stadium; Kennesaw, GA	ESPN+	W 38–7	10,108
September 9	6:00 p.m.	at Chattanooga	Finley Stadium; Chattanooga, TN	ESPN+	L 20–27	8,123
September 16	5:00 p.m.	No. 7 Furman	Fifth Third Bank Stadium; Kennesaw, GA	ESPN+	L 28–31	6,993
September 23	7:00 p.m.	at Tennessee Tech	Tucker Stadium; Cookeville, TN	ESPN+	L 7–17	9,923
September 30	6:00 p.m.	at Charleston Southern	Buccaneer Field; North Charleston, SC	ESPN+	L 10–13	3,087
October 7	3:00 p.m.	Tennessee State^{†}	Fifth Third Bank Stadium; Kennesaw, GA	ESPN+	L 20–27	10,436
October 28	3:00 p.m.	Lincoln (CA)	Fifth Third Bank Stadium; Kennesaw, GA	ESPN+	W 28–12	6,013
November 4	1:00 p.m.	at Sam Houston	Bowers Stadium; Huntsville, TX	ESPN+	L 21–24	7,143
November 11	3:00 p.m.	Virginia–Lynchburg	Fifth Third Bank Stadium; Kennesaw, GA	ESPN+	W 63–3	5,735
^{†}Homecoming; Rankings from STATS Poll released prior to the game; All times are in Eastern time

== Game summaries ==
=== at Sam Houston ===
Kennesaw State Owls at Sam Houston State Bearkats – Game summary

Quarter	1	2	3	4	Total
Owls	14	7	0	0	21
Bearkats	0	7	7	10	24

at Bowers Stadium, Huntsville, Texas

- Date: November 4
- Game time: 12:00 p.m. CDT
- Game weather: Sunny
- Game attendance: 7,143
- Referee: Joe Lehring
- TV: ESPN+
- Box score, Recap

Game information
First quarter
- KENN - Michael Benefield 75-yard run (Conor Cummins kick), 11:00. Owls 0-7. Drive: 3 plays, 83 yards, 1:03.
- KENN - Micheal Benefield 3-yard run (Conor Cummins kick), 2:13. Owls 0-14. Drive: 4 plays, 6 yards, 1:57.

Second quarter

- SHSU - Noah Smith 24-yard pass from Keegan Shoemaker (Colby Sessums kick), 7:18. Owls 7-14. Drive: 7 plays, 80 yards, 2:35.
- KENN - Jonathan Murphy 57-yard run (Conor Cummins kick), 4:58. Owls 21-7. Drive: 5 plays, 75 yards, 2:20.

Third quarter

- SHSU - Elijah Sohn 5-yard pass from Keegan Shoemaker (Colby Sessums kick), 0:33. Owls 14-21. Drive: 13 plays, 74 yards, 5:08.

Fourth quarter

- SHSU - Jay Rockwell 2-yard pass from Keegan Shoemaker (Colby Sessums kick), 3:49. Tied 21-21. Drive: 16 plays, 80 yards, 9:24.
- SHSU - Colby Sessums 35-yard field goal, 0:00. Bearkats 24-21. Drive: 9 plays, 36 yards, 2:59.

Statistics	KSU	SHSU
First downs	9	27
Total yards	291	347
Rushing yards	247	105
Passing yards	44	242
Turnovers	1	3
Time of possession	24:06	35:54

Team	Category	Player	Statistics
Kennesaw State	Passing	Johnathan Murphy	8/14, 44 yards, INT
Kennesaw State	Rushing	Micheal Benefield	11 rushes, 108 yards, 2 TD
Kennesaw State	Receiving	Rowan Darnell	2 receptions, 18 yards
Sam Houston State	Passing	Keegan Shoemaker	30/38, 242 yards, 3 TD, INT
Sam Houston State	Rushing	Zach Hrbacek	18 rushes, 50 yards
Sam Houston State	Receiving	Noah Smith	7 receptions, 78 yards, TD
