= Chandler Burks =

American football coach (born 1996)

Current position
- Title: Tight ends coach
- Team: Army
- Conference: American

Biographical details
- Born: January 13, 1996 (age 30); Austell, Georgia, U.S.

Playing career
- 2015–2018: Kennesaw State
- Position: Quarterback

Coaching career (HC unless noted)
- 2019: Wofford (DQC)
- 2020–2023: Kennesaw State (QB)
- 2024: Kennesaw State (co-OC/QB)
- 2024: Kennesaw State (interim HC)
- 2025–present: Army (TE)

Head coaching record
- Overall: 1–2

Chandler Burks (born January 13, 1996) is an American college football coach. He is a tight ends coach for Army. He previously served as the interim head football coach for Kennesaw State University during the 2024 season, following the resignation of head coach Brian Bohannon.

== Playing career ==
Burks was born on January 13, 1996, in Austell, Georgia. He attended South Paulding High School in Douglasville, Georgia. Burks committed to play college football at Kennesaw State University, becoming the first recruit to ever commit to the program. In 2017, he was named the Big South Offensive Player of the Year. In 2018, he threw for 1,043 yards and ten touchdowns, while also rushing for 905 yards and 29 touchdowns. As a result, he was named a finalist for the Walter Payton Award.

== Coaching career ==
Burks joined the Wofford Terriers in 2019 as part of the defensive quality control staff, before returning to Kennesaw State as the quarterbacks coach. He served this position for four seasons, before being promoted to co-offensive coordinator alongside Stewart Cook. On November 10, 2024, Burks was named the interim coach for Kennesaw State, after Brian Bohannon stepped down.

In January 2025, Burks was named the tight ends coach for Army.

== Head coaching record ==
Year	Team	Overall	Conference	Standing	Bowl/playoffs
Kennesaw State Owls (Conference USA) (2024)
2024	Kennesaw State	1–2 (Note: Burks became interim head coach after Brian Bohannon's resignation following week 10.)	1–2	T–8th	
Kennesaw State:		1–2	1–2		
Total:		1–2			
