= Milton Overton =

American athletic director

Current position
- Title: Athletic director
- Team: Kennesaw State
- Conference: CUSA

Biographical details
- Education: University of Oklahoma

Playing career
- 1991–1995: Oklahoma
- Position: Offensive line

Administrative career (AD unless noted)
- 1999–2009: Texas A&M (associate AD)
- 2009–2015: Alabama (associate AD)
- 2015–2017: Florida A&M
- 2017–present: Kennesaw State

Milton Overton is the current director of athletics for Kennesaw State University. He previously served as athletic director at Florida A&M University from 2015 to 2017, as an associate athletic director at the University of Alabama from 2009 to 2015, and as an associate athletic director at Texas A&M University from 1999 to 2009. Overton attended college at the University of Oklahoma, where he played on the offensive line on the Oklahoma Sooners football team. Overton was named athletic director at Kennesaw State University on October 31, 2017.

== Personal life ==
His son, LT Overton, is a defensive lineman for the Dallas Cowboys.
