= Jerry Mack =

American football player and coach (born 1980)

Current position
- Title: Head coach
- Team: Kennesaw State
- Conference: CUSA
- Record: 15–10

Biographical details
- Born: October 24, 1980 (age 46); Memphis, Tennessee, U.S.
- Education: Arkansas State University

Playing career
- 1999–2000: Jackson State
- 2001–2003: Arkansas State
- Position: Wide receiver

Coaching career (HC unless noted)
- 2004–2005: Delta State (GA)
- 2006–2007: Jackson State (WR/TE)
- 2008–2009: Central Arkansas (Passing game coord./WR)
- 2010: Arkansas–Pine Bluff (OC/QB)
- 2011: Memphis (WR)
- 2012–2013: South Alabama (WR)
- 2014–2017: North Carolina Central
- 2018: Rice (OC/QB)
- 2019–2020: Rice (AHC/OC/QB)
- 2021–2023: Tennessee (RB)
- 2024: Jacksonville Jaguars (RB)
- 2025–present: Kennesaw State

Head coaching record
- Overall: 46–25
- Bowls: 0–2

Accomplishments and honors

Championships
- 3× MEAC (2014–2016); CUSA (2025); (Note: He was co-champion in 2014 and 2015 alongside several teams both seasons.)

Awards
- MEAC Coach of the Year (2016); CUSA Coach of the Year (2025)

Jerry Mack (born October 24, 1980) is an American college football coach and former player who is currently the head football coach at Kennesaw State University. Mack served as the head football coach at North Carolina Central University from 2014 to 2017, compiling a record of 31–15 in four seasons. He was the offensive coordinator and associate football head coach at Rice University prior to his hiring at Tennessee. Mack played college football as a wide receiver for the Jackson State Tigers and the Arkansas State Indians.

== Coaching career ==
=== Delta State ===
Mack began his coaching career as an offensive graduate assistant for Delta State between 2004 until 2005. During that period, he worked with the running backs, as an assistant special teams coordinator, and video coordinator.

=== Jackson State ===
In 2006 and 2007, Mack served as the wide receivers coach and tight ends coach for Jackson State.

=== Central Arkansas ===
In 2008 and 2009, Mack worked at Central Arkansas as the team's passing game coordinator and wide receivers coach.

=== Arkansas–Pine Bluff ===
For the 2010 season, he worked for Arkansas–Pine Bluff as the team's offensive coordinator and quarterbacks coach. He helped change an offense that was ranked 101st in the nation in total offense to 30th nationally.

=== Memphis ===
For the 2011 he went to work in his hometown of Memphis for the Tigers as the team’s wide receivers coach.

=== South Alabama ===
In 2012 and 2013 he served as the wide receivers coach for South Alabama Jaguars.

=== North Carolina Central ===
From 2014 to 2017 Mack served as the head coach for the North Carolina Central Eagles. Within his four seasons at North Carolina Central University as the team’s head coach, he led the Eagles to a berth in the 2016 Celebration Bowl. He compiled 31-15 record in four seasons as one of the youngest head coaches at the FBS/FCS level at the time. He was named the 2016 HBCU Football Coach of the Year by Black College Sports Page and The Pigskin Club in Washington, D.C., following NCCU breaking its school record for offense on its way to the Celebration Bowl.

=== Rice ===
Mack was named Rice's offensive coordinator and quarterbacks coach on December 12, 2017. On February 13, 2019, he was given the added title as associate head coach. He stayed there until the end of the 2020 season.

=== Tennessee ===
In 2021, Mack became the running backs coach at the University of Tennessee.

=== Jacksonville Jaguars ===
On February 22, 2024, Mack was named running back coach for the Jacksonville Jaguars of the NFL.

=== Kennesaw State ===
On December 1, 2024, Mack was named head coach for the Kennesaw State Owls football team in the Conference USA.

In his first season as head coach, Mack was named Conference USA Coach of the Year after finishing 9-3 in the regular season with a team that went 2-10 the prior season. Mack won the 2025 C-USA Championship after defeating regular season champion Jacksonville State 19-15.

== Personal life ==
Mack and his wife, Starlett, have three children.

== Head coaching record ==
| Year | Team | Overall | Conference | Standing | Bowl/playoffs |
|---|---|---|---|---|---|
North Carolina Central Eagles (Mid-Eastern Athletic Conference) (2014–2017)
| 2014 | North Carolina Central | 7–5 | 6–2 | T–1st | |
| 2015 | North Carolina Central | 8–3 | 7–1 | T–1st | |
| 2016 | North Carolina Central | 9–3 | 8–0 | 1st | L Celebration |
| 2017 | North Carolina Central | 7–4 | 5–3 | T–4th | |
| North Carolina Central: | | 31–15 | 26–6 | | |
Kennesaw State Owls (Conference USA) (2025–present)
| 2025 | Kennesaw State | 10–4 | 7–1 | T–1st | L Myrtle Beach |
| 2026 | Kennesaw State | 5–6 | 4–3 | | |
| Kennesaw State: | | 15–10 | 11–4 | | |
| Total: | | 46–25 | | | |
National championship Conference title Conference division title or championship game berth
