= Kennesaw State Owls football =

NCAA Division I college football team

2026 Kennesaw State Owls football team
- First season: 2015; 11 years ago
- Athletic director: Milton Overton
- General manager: Mike Kershaw
- Head coach: Jerry Mack; 2nd season, 10–4 (.714)
- Location: Kennesaw, Georgia
- Stadium: Fifth Third Stadium (capacity: 10,200)
- NCAA division: Division I FBS
- Conference: Conference USA
- Colors: Black and gold
- All-time record: 83–44 (.654)
- Bowl record: 0–1 (.000)

Conference championships
- Big South: 2017, 2018, 2021 C-USA: 2025
- Rivalries: Jacksonville State (rivalry); Liberty (rivalry)
- Fight song: The KSU Fight Song
- Mascot: Scrappy the Owl
- Marching band: The Marching Owls
- Website: ksuowls.com

The Kennesaw State Owls football program represents Kennesaw State University in college football. The Owls team competes in the Football Bowl Subdivision (FBS) of the National Collegiate Athletic Association (NCAA) as a member of Conference USA (CUSA). The team began play in 2015 as a member of the Big South Conference at the NCAA Division I Football Championship Subdivision (FCS) level. In 2022, KSU's full-time home of the Atlantic Sun Conference (then officially branded as the ASUN Conference) launched an FCS football league, with KSU as one of its initial six members. After the 2022 season, KSU started the transition to the FBS, in advance of the school's 2024 move to CUSA.

The head coach of the Owls is Jerry Mack, and the Owls play at Fifth Third Stadium just outside the city limits of Kennesaw, Georgia.

== History ==
=== Planning stages (2007–2009) ===
Kennesaw State had considered adding a football team at various points in its history. The school had concluded a feasibility survey which affirmed it would be possible to have Division I football. On November 9, 2007, a survey was administered by the Student Government with 77.6 percent of respondents voting in favor of starting a football program. Participation in the survey was supposed to be restricted to enrolled students only; however, due to a design flaw, anyone could take the survey an unlimited number of times.

=== Building stages (2009–2013) ===
In December 2009, KSU President Daniel S. Papp appointed a football exploratory committee headed by legendary University of Georgia coach, Vince Dooley. The committee announced a highly favorable recommendation for the creation of a football program at KSU in a 137-page report on September 15, 2010, in a press conference at the KSU Convocation Center.

KSU athletic director Vaughn Williams stated that KSU was targeting fielding a team for the 2014 season playing at the Football Championship Subdivision (FCS) level formerly known as I-AA. KSU presented its plans for the football program to the State Board of Regents on February 13, 2013, and on February 14, KSU officially announced that the State Board of Regents had accepted its proposal for the football team. The school started the football program with the 2015 season.

At the time that football started play, KSU was a member of the Atlantic Sun Conference, which would not sponsor football until the 2020s. KSU would thus have to either play as an independent or find a new conference to join, either for all sports or as a football associate. On September 3, 2013, KSU announced that it would join the Big South Conference as a football-only member to begin play in the 2015 season. In 2016, the Atlantic Sun and Big South agreed to an alliance between the two conferences where football-playing schools in both conferences were part of one Big South conference for the sport. North Alabama, which later joined the Atlantic Sun, became the second such school in the Atlantic Sun under this alliance.

Brian Bohannon was appointed the first head football coach at Kennesaw State.

=== The start – 2015 season ===
The program began playing games in the fall of 2015, with a 56–16 win against East Tennessee State. The Owls finished the season 6–5 (2–4 in the Big South).

=== Early success – 2017 and 2018 ===
In the program's fourth year of existence (third season played, as the 2014 season was practice only and every player took a red shirt) the Owls won the 2017 Big South Championship, going 5–0 in conference play. Kennesaw State received the conference's automatic bid to the FCS Playoffs in both those seasons, in 2017 as an unseeded team the Owls hosted Samford in a rematch of the season opener, Kennesaw avenged the early season loss and went on the next week to upset the third-ranked Jacksonville State Gamecocks. At the time that was the best win in program history. After the huge win the Owls traveled to sixth-ranked Sam Houston State for the quarterfinals, the Owls lost the game 34–27, but had a huge swing of momentum heading into the 2018 season. Kennesaw State finished the season ranked eighth in the FCS STATS Poll (the highest media poll in the FCS) and ninth in the coaches' poll.

In the 2018 season the Owls opened at fifth in both polls, the highest in program history. Kennesaw lost its third-straight season opener, a road loss to nearby Georgia State. It was the program's first game against an FBS team and ended with a 24–20 loss at GA State Stadium (formerly Centennial Olympic Stadium and Turner Field). After the setback the Owls did not lose again, winning 11 games in a row. After a 56–17 road win against Gardner-Webb, Kennesaw was voted to the number two spot in both the FCS STATS and coaches' polls, behind only North Dakota State. Just like in 2017, Kennesaw finished 5–0 in the Big South, winning a second consecutive conference championship. That made the Owls the first team to win the conference outright in back to back seasons since former member Liberty did so in 2007 and 2008. The regular season was completed with a win against Jacksonville State at SunTrust Park. A five-overtime shootout ended in a 60–52 Owl victory that is now regarded as the most exciting in school history. Holding a 10–1 regular season record, Kennesaw received a first-round bye as the fourth seed in the FCS playoffs. In the second round the Owls hosted the Wofford College Terriers, winning 13–10. The Owls lost in the quarterfinals for the second year in a row the following week at home against South Dakota State. Kennesaw finished the season ranked fifth in the FCS STATS poll and fourth in the coaches' poll, the best in their short history.

At the conclusion of the 2019 season, in which Kennesaw was 11–3, the Owls tallied a 48–15 total record from the start of the program. That put the Owls as the winningest startup football program through the first five years of playing football.

In 2022, the owls accepted an invitation to join Conference USA starting in 2024 as they would move up to the FBS level of play.

=== Jerry Mack era – 2025-present ===
In 2025, the Owls led by first-year coach Jerry Mack, had a remarkable season, finishing 9-3 in the regular season and earning their first-ever Conference USA Championship game appearance, where they defeated defending champion Jacksonville State 19-15 to win the title, achieving a significant turnaround after their previous season.

== Championships ==
=== Conference championships ===
Kennesaw State has won four conference championships.

Year	Coach	Conference	Overall record	Conference record
2017	Brian Bohannon	Big South Conference	12–2	5–0
2018	Brian Bohannon	Big South Conference	11–2	5–0
2021	Brian Bohannon	Big South Conference	11–2	7–0
2025	Jerry Mack	Conference USA	10–3	7–1

== Bowl Games ==
Kennesaw State has appeared in one bowl game their first in school history with a record of 0–1.

Season	Coach	Bowl	Opponent	Result
2025	Jerry Mack	Myrtle Beach Bowl	Western Michigan	L 6–41

== Playoff results ==
The Owls have appeared in the NCAA Division I Football Championship playoffs four times. Their record is 5–4.

Year	Round	Opponent	Result
2017	First round Second round Quarterfinals	Samford; Jacksonville State; Sam Houston State	W 28–17; W 17–7; L 27–34
2018	Second round Quarterfinals	Wofford; South Dakota State	W 13–10; L 17–27
2019	First round Second round	Wofford; Weber State	W 28–21; L 20–26
2021	First round Second round	Davidson; East Tennessee State	W 48–21; L 31–32

== Notable former players ==
- Bron Breakker played football for Kennesaw State before signing with WWE, has since become a two-time Intercontinental Champion.
- Travis Bell became the first Kennesaw State player to be selected in the NFL draft when he was selected in the seventh round, 218th overall, in the 2023 NFL draft.

== Future non-conference opponents ==
Announced schedules as of November 16, 2026.

2027	2028	2029	2030	2031	2032	2033
Mississippi Valley State	at North Carolina		at North Carolina		at Georgia Southern	Georgia Southern
at Indiana	at Georgia State					
at Vanderbilt						
at Louisiana						
