= 2018 Charlotte 49ers football team =

American college football season

2018 Charlotte 49ers football
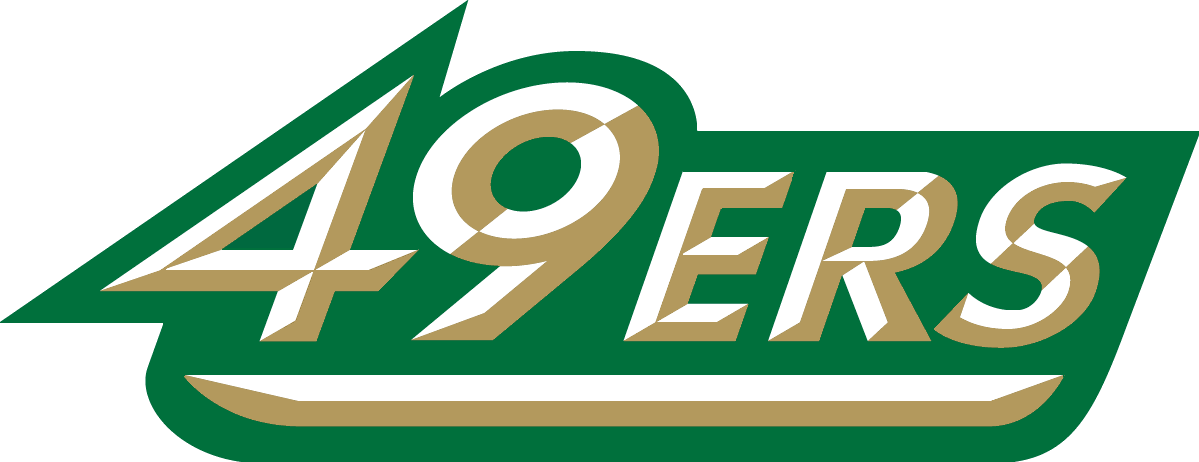
- Conference: Conference USA
- East Division
- Record: 5–7 (4–4 C-USA)
- Head coach: Brad Lambert (6th season)
- Offensive coordinator: Shane Montgomery (1st season)
- Offensive scheme: Pro-style
- Co-defensive coordinators: Glenn Spencer (1st season); Chip West (1st season)
- Base defense: 4–3
- Home stadium: Jerry Richardson Stadium

2018 Conference USA football standings
	Conf.			Overall
Team	W		L	W		L
East Division
Middle Tennessee x	7	–	1	8	–	6
FIU	6	–	2	9	–	4
Marshall	6	–	2	9	–	4
Charlotte	4	–	4	5	–	7
Florida Atlantic	3	–	5	5	–	7
Old Dominion	2	–	6	4	–	8
Western Kentucky	2	–	6	3	–	9
West Division
UAB x$	7	–	1	11	–	3
North Texas	5	–	3	9	–	4
Louisiana Tech	5	–	3	8	–	5
Southern Miss	5	–	3	6	–	5
UTSA	2	–	6	3	–	9
UTEP	1	–	7	1	–	11
Rice	1	–	7	2	–	11
Championship: UAB 27, Middle Tennessee 25
$ – Conference champion; x – Division champion/co-champions

The 2018 Charlotte 49ers football team represented the University of North Carolina at Charlotte in the 2018 NCAA Division I FBS football season. The 49ers played their home games at Jerry Richardson Stadium in Charlotte, NC, and competed in the East Division of Conference USA (C–USA). They were led by sixth-year head coach Brad Lambert. They finished the season 5–7, 4–4 in C-USA play to finish in fourth place in the East Division.

On November 18, head coach Brad Lambert was fired. He was allowed to stay on to coach their final game of the season. Lambert, who was the first and only coach Charlotte had in their history to that point, finished with a six-year record of 22–48.

On December 5, Charlotte hired Austin Peay head coach Will Healy for the job.

== Coaching staff ==
Following the disappointing one win season, there was speculation that Brad Lambert would be released. Charlotte Chancellor Phillip Dubois and athletics director Judy Rose issued a statement just days after the final game informing the community that Lambert would be retained for the following season. Lambert shook up his staff, firing defensive coordinator Matt Wallerstedt, quarterbacks coach and former offensive coordinator Jeff Mullen and receivers coach Damien Gary. Greg Adkins had replaced Mullen as offensive coordinator mid-season but went back to only having responsibility for the offensive line and running backs and would soon resign to join the staff at conference rival Marshall. Before the end of the year Youngstown State offensive coordinator and former Miami of Ohio head coach Shawn Montgomery would be called in to serve as the 49ers' play caller on offense. In February, former Oklahoma State defensive coordinator Glenn Spencer took the same position on the 49ers' staff. Charlie Shalaski took over responsibility for receivers at the same time. A week later Howard co-defensive coordinator Chip West would join the staff to serve as co-defensive coordinator with Spencer, with Spencer being responsible for linebackers and West being in charge of Cornerbacks. Graduate assistant Brad Queen would move up to the coaching staff to coach defensive tackles. Former Tulane head coach Chris Scelfo joined the staff before the Spring Game to serve as the 49ers offensive line coach and run game coordinator. James Adams's promotion to assistant head coach before the Spring Game rounded out the staff changes for the upcoming 2018 season.

Name	Position	Seasons at Charlotte	Alma mater
Brad Lambert	Head coach/Defensive line	6	Kansas State (1987)
Shane Montgomery	Offensive coordinator/quarterbacks	1	NC State (1989)
Glenn Spencer	Co-Defensive coordinator/linebackers	1	Georgia Tech (1987)
Chip West	Co-Defensive coordinator/Cornerbacks	1	Livingston College (1993)
James Adams	Assistant Head coach/Safeties	6	Wake Forest (2006)
Ulrick Edmonds	Recruiting coordinator/Defensive Ends	3	James Madison (2001)
Keith Henry	Running backs	2	Catawba College (1989)
Brad Queen	Defensive tackles	3	Kentucky Christian (2011)
Johnson Richardson	Tight ends	6	Wofford (2010)
Chris Scelfo	offensive line/run game coordinator	1	UL-Monroe (1986)
Charlie Skalaski	Receivers/Special teams	2	Florida (1978)

== Recruiting ==
=== Recruiting class ===
The following recruits and transfers have signed letters of intent or verbally committed to the Charlotte 49ers football program for the 2018 recruiting year.

College recruiting information (2018)
Name	Hometown	School	Height	Weight	40^{‡}	Commit date
Damon Anderson; DB	Scranton, PA	Lackawanna	6 ft 1 in (1.85 m)	200 lb (91 kg)	–	Dec 20, 2016
Damon Anderson; DB	Recruit ratings: Scout: Rivals: 247Sports: ESPN:					
Dantrell Barkley; DT	Independence, KS	Independence CC	6 ft 4 in (1.93 m)	285 lb (129 kg)	–	Feb 7, 2018
Dantrell Barkley; DT	Recruit ratings: Scout: Rivals: 247Sports: ESPN:					
John Brosnahan; P	Concord, NC	Cox Mill	6 ft 0 in (1.83 m)	185 lb (84 kg)	–	–
John Brosnahan; P	Recruit ratings: Scout: Rivals: 247Sports: ESPN:					
Wesley Bullard; WR	Matthews, NC	Jireh Preparatory School	5 ft 10 in (1.78 m)	150 lb (68 kg)	–	Jan 2, 2018
Wesley Bullard; WR	Recruit ratings: Scout: Rivals: 247Sports: ESPN:					
Taylor Chandler; DE	London, NC	North Stanly	6 ft 2 in (1.88 m)	207 lb (94 kg)	–	Dec 19, 2017
Taylor Chandler; DE	Recruit ratings: Scout: Rivals: 247Sports: ESPN:					
Jonathan Cruz; K	Cartersville, GA	Cartersville	5 ft 9 in (1.75 m)	147 lb (67 kg)	–	Feb 7, 2018
Jonathan Cruz; K	Recruit ratings: Scout: Rivals: 247Sports: ESPN:					
Ben Duyck; OC	Charlotte, NC	Charlotte Christian	6 ft 2 in (1.88 m)	290 lb (130 kg)	–	Jan 26, 2018
Ben Duyck; OC	Recruit ratings: Scout: Rivals: 247Sports: ESPN:					
Malik Harkness; TE	Lugoff, SC	Lugoff-Elgin	6 ft 5 in (1.96 m)	280 lb (130 kg)	–	
Malik Harkness; TE	Recruit ratings: Scout: Rivals: 247Sports: ESPN:					
Jacob Hunt; TE	Rome, GA	Darlington School	6 ft 4 in (1.93 m)	255 lb (116 kg)	–	Jun 27, 2017
Jacob Hunt; TE	Recruit ratings: Scout: Rivals: 247Sports: ESPN:					
Justin Jeffrey; ATH	Richmond Hill, GA	Richmond Hill	6 ft 1 in (1.85 m)	170 lb (77 kg)	–	Dec 20, 2017
Justin Jeffrey; ATH	Recruit ratings: Scout: Rivals: 247Sports: ESPN:					
Matt Martinez; DE	Mooresville, NC	Mooresville Senior	6 ft 2 in (1.88 m)	175 lb (79 kg)	–	Dec 20, 2017
Matt Martinez; DE	Recruit ratings: Scout: Rivals: 247Sports: ESPN:					
Jonnie Pitman; DB	Oxon Hill, MD	Potomac	6 ft 0 in (1.83 m)	175 lb (79 kg)	–	Jul 7, 2017
Jonnie Pitman; DB	Recruit ratings: Scout: Rivals: 247Sports: ESPN:					
Brady Pope; QB	Statesville, NC	Statesville	6 ft 3 in (1.91 m)	175 lb (79 kg)	–	May 10, 2017
Brady Pope; QB	Recruit ratings: Scout: Rivals: 247Sports: ESPN:					
Tyler Ringwood; WR	Buffalo, NY	Erie CC	6 ft 3 in (1.91 m)	221 lb (100 kg)	–	Feb 7, 2018
Tyler Ringwood; WR	Recruit ratings: Scout: Rivals: 247Sports: ESPN:					
Dejan Rasou; OT	Jamestown, NC	Lucy Ragsdale	6 ft 5 in (1.96 m)	250 lb (110 kg)	–	Jan 11, 2018
Dejan Rasou; OT	Recruit ratings: Scout: Rivals: 247Sports: ESPN:					
Moss Saccomanno; TE	Dodge City, KS	Dodge City CC	6 ft 5 in (1.96 m)	238 lb (108 kg)	–	Dec 20, 2017
Moss Saccomanno; TE	Recruit ratings: Scout: Rivals: 247Sports: ESPN:					
Terrick Smalls, Jr. RB	Savannah, GA	Benedictine Military	5 ft 10 in (1.78 m)	200 lb (91 kg)	–	Dec 20, 2017
Terrick Smalls, Jr. RB	Recruit ratings: Scout: Rivals: 247Sports: ESPN:					
Dominic Taylor; OL	Hutchinson, KS	Hutchinson Community College	6 ft 5 in (1.96 m)	280 lb (130 kg)	–	Dec 20, 2017
Dominic Taylor; OL	Recruit ratings: Scout: Rivals: 247Sports: ESPN:					
Jonathan Timmons; OL	Coffeyville, KS	Coffeyville CC	6 ft 5 in (1.96 m)	335 lb (152 kg)	–	Dec 20, 2017
Jonathan Timmons; OL	Recruit ratings: Scout: Rivals: 247Sports: ESPN:					
B.J. Turner; LB	Greensboro, NC	Page	6 ft 1 in (1.85 m)	208 lb (94 kg)	–	Feb 7, 2018
B.J. Turner; LB	Recruit ratings: Scout: Rivals: 247Sports: ESPN:					
Markees Watts; LB	Lancaster, SC	Lancaster	6 ft 2 in (1.88 m)	215 lb (98 kg)	–	Dec 20, 2017
Markees Watts; LB	Recruit ratings: Scout: Rivals: 247Sports: ESPN:					
Bryan Wallace; DE	Berryville, VA	Clarke County	6 ft 5 in (1.96 m)	235 lb (107 kg)	–	Jul 24, 2017
Bryan Wallace; DE	Recruit ratings: Scout: Rivals: 247Sports: ESPN:					
Damon Weldon; DE	Fork Union, VA	Fork Union Military	6 ft 5 in (1.96 m)	235 lb (107 kg)	–	Dec 20, 2017
Damon Weldon; DE	Recruit ratings: Scout: Rivals: 247Sports: ESPN:					
Dalton Widner; OL	Knoxville, TN	Gibbs	6 ft 4 in (1.93 m)	280 lb (130 kg)	–	Apr 29, 2017
Dalton Widner; OL	Recruit ratings: Scout: Rivals: 247Sports: ESPN:					
Chris Wiggins; WR	Greensboro, NC	Grimsley	6 ft 2 in (1.88 m)	195 lb (88 kg)	–	Jun 30, 2017
Chris Wiggins; WR	Recruit ratings: Scout: Rivals: 247Sports: ESPN:					
Emmanuel White; DE	Decatur, GA	Georgia Prep Sports Academy	6 ft 7 in (2.01 m)	235 lb (107 kg)	–	
Emmanuel White; DE	Recruit ratings: Scout: Rivals: 247Sports: ESPN:					
Overall recruit ranking: Scout: 112 Rivals: N/A 247Sports: 112 ESPN: N/A
‡ Refers to 40-yard dash; Note: In many cases, Scout, Rivals, 247Sports, On3, and ESPN may conflict in their listings of height, weight and 40 time.; In these cases, the average was taken. ESPN grades are on a 100-point scale.; Sources: "Charlotte Football Commitments". Rivals.; "2018 Charlotte Football Commits". Scout.; "ESPN". ESPN.; "Scout.com Team Recruiting Rankings". Scout.; "2018 Team Ranking". Rivals.com.

== Players ==
=== Roster ===
2018 Charlotte 49ers football team roster
Players
Coaches
Offense

Pos.	#	Name	Class
WR	2	Cameron Bent	RFr
WR	3	Mark Quattlebaum	RSr
WR	4	Cameron Dollar	RFr
RB	5	Arron McAllister	RSo
WR	6	Workpeh Kofa	RSr
QB	7	Hasaan Klugh	RSr
H-Back	8	R.J. Tyler	RSr
WR	9	Victor Tucker	RFr
QB	10	Daniel Ratliff	Fr
WR	12	Justin Jeffrey	Fr
QB	13	Brady Pope	Fr
QB	14	Joe Thompson	RSo
QB	16	Evan Shirreffs	GS
QB	17	Chris Reynolds (injured)	RFr
WR	19	Cade Barnhill	RFr
QB	19	Willie Green	RFr
WR	21	Rico Arnold	Fr
WR	22	Angelo Marreno	RFr
RB	26	Caleb Parker	Fr
RB	29	Calvin Camp	RFr
RB	30	Ishod Finger	Fr
RB	31	Terrick Smalls Jr.	Fr
RB	32	Benny LeMay (C)	Jr
WR	35	Wesley Bullard	Fr
OL	51	Chris Brown	RSr
OL	53	Jalen Allen	Sr
OL	55	Michael Adams	RFr
OL	60	Darren Drake	Sr
OL	63	Jacob Webb	RFr
OL	64	Nate Davis	RSr
OL	66	Jack Mitchell	Fr
OL	67	Ben Duyck	Fr
OL	68	Jaelin Fisher	RSo
OL	69	Dejan Rasuo	Fr
OL	70	D'Mitri Emmanuel	RFr
OL	71	Cameron Clark (C)	RJr
OL	72	Gage Welborn	Fr
OL	75	Dominic Taylor	Jr
OL	76	Jonathan Timmons	RSo
OL	77	Malik Harkness	Fr
OL	78	Trevor Stacy	RJr
OL	79	Dalton Widner	Fr
WR	81	Tyler Ringwood	RSo
WR	82	Zach Gemmell	RFr
WR	83	Chris Wiggins	Fr
H-Back	84	Ryan Eachus	RJr
H-Back	85	Ryan Carriere	RSo
H-Back	86	Moss Saccomanno	So
TE	87	Chris Phillips	Sr
TE	88	Jacob Hunt	Fr
WR	89	Chris Tomberlin	RJr
TE	95	David Foust	Sr

Defense

Pos.	#	Name	Class
DB	2	Ed Rolle	Sr
LB	3	Darius Irvin	RJr
LB	5	Alex Highsmith	RJr
LB	7	Anthony Butler	Jr
DB	8	Nafees Lyon	RJr
DB	9	Quinton Jordan	Sr
LB	10	Tyriq Harris (C)	RJr
DL	14	Michael Holmes	RJr
DB	15	Marquavis Gibbs	Jr
LB	17	Luke Martin	So
LB	17	Lance McMillian	Fr
LB	21	Juwan Foggie	RSr
DB	22	J.T. Starr	RSo
DB	23	Matt Martinez	Fr
DB	25	Denzel Irvin	RSr
DB	26	Jacione Fugate	RSo
DB	27	Ben Bowbliss	RFr
DB	28	Ben DeLuca	Jr
DB	29	Jonnie Pitman	Fr
DL	32	Julian Wheaton	RJr
LB	34	Jeff Gemmell (C)	RJr
DB	36	Robert Cheatem	RSo
DB	37	Keshaun Woods	RSo
LB	39	George Maya	RFr
LB	40	Markees Watts	Fr
DB	41	A.J. McDonald	RJr
LB	42	Henry Segura	RFr
DB	43	Christian Haynes	RJr
LB	44	Code Bartrum	RFr
LB	45	Javonte Misenheimer	RFr
LB	46	Dillon Overholt	Fr
LB	52	Matthew Longley	RSo
DL	55	Spencer Hill	Fr
LB	56	William Graham	RSo
DL	58	Johnny Ray	RSo
LB	59	B.J. Turner	Fr
DL	60	Bryan Wallace	Fr
DL	61	Ernest King	RFr
DL	62	Tyler Fain	RSr
DL	74	Tim Baten	RFr
DE	80	Ben Jacques	RJr
DE	86	Antonie Shaw	RFr
DL	87	Isaiah Harris	RJr
DL	90	Tommy Doctor (injured)	RJr
DL	91	Dantrell Barkley	RSo
DL	92	Nick Martin	RSo
DE	93	Emmanuel White	RFr
DE	94	Isiah Belk	Fr
DE	97	Damon Weldon Jr.	Fr
DL	98	Timmy Horne	RSo
DE	99	Taylor Chandler	Fr

Special teams

Pos.	#	Name	Class
K	11	Jonathan Cruz	Fr
K	18	Jackson Vansickle	RJr
P/K	39	Kyle Corbett	RSo
LS	47	Jack Wellenhofer	RSo
P/K	48	Trey Smelcer	Fr
LS	54	Brian McDonough	RSr
P	65	John Brosnahan	Fr
K	95	Andrew Favaro	RFr

Head coach

- Brad Lambert (Kansas State)
  Defensive line

Coordinators/assistant coaches

- Shane Montgomery (NC State)
  Offensive coordinator/quarterbacks
- Glenn Spencer (Georgia Tech)
  Co-defensive coordinator/linebackers
- Chip West (Livingstone)
  Co-defensive coordinator/Cornerbacks
- James Adams (Wake Forest)
  Assistant head coach/secondary
- Ulrick Edmonds (James Madison)
  Recruiting coordinator/defensive Ends
- Keith Henry (Catawba)
  Running backs
- Brad Queen (Kentucky Christian)
  Defensive tackles
- Johnson Richardson (Wofford)
  Tight ends
- Chris Scelfo (Louisiana–Monroe)
  Offensive Line/Run Game coordinator
- Charlie Skalaski (Florida)
  Receivers/special teams

Legend

- (C) Team captain
- (S) Suspended
- (I) Ineligible
- Injured
- Redshirt

Roster
Last update: December 7, 2018

=== Awards and honors ===
==== Preseason ====
Awards Watch List	Player	Position	Year
Wuerffel Trophy	Juwan Foggie	LB	SR
Preseason All-Conference USA Team	Ben DeLuca	DB	JR

==== In-Season ====
Award	Player	Position	Year	Game
Conference USA Special Teams Player of the Week	Jonathan Cruz	K	FR	Appalachian State
Conference USA Defensive Player of the Week	Juwan Foggie	LB	SR	Western Kentucky
Conference USA Special Teams Player of the Week	Jonathan Cruz	K	FR	Southern Miss
Conference USA Defensive Player of the Week	Alex Highsmith	DE	RJR	Tennessee
Conference USA Special Teams Player of the Week	Jonathan Cruz	K	FR	Florida Atlantic
PFF National Team of the Week	Alex Highsmith	DE	RJR	Florida Atlantic
College Sports Madness Conference USA Defensive Player of the Week	Alex Highsmith	DE	RJR	Florida Atlantic

==== Post-season ====
Award	Player	Position	Year
2019 Reese's Senior Bowl	Nate Davis	OL	RSR
CoSIDA Google Cloud First Team all-Academic District 3	Tyriq Harris	DE	RJR
Conference USA all-Academic Team	Tyriq Harris	DE	RSR

2018 all-C-USA Freshman Football Team
Player	Position
Rico Arnold	WR
Jonathan Cruz	K
Henry Segura	LB
Victor Tucker	WR

2018 all-Conference USA Football Team
Selection	Player	Position	Year
First Team	Alex Highsmith	DE	RJR
Second Team	Benny LeMay	RB	JR
Second Team	Nate Davis	OL	RSR
Second Team	Juwan Foggie	LB	RSR
Second Team	Jonathan Cruz	K	FR
Honorable Mention	Chris Phillips	TE	RSR
Honorable Mention	Tyriq Harris	DE	RJR
Honorable Mention	Ben DeLuca	DB	JR

2018 PFF all-Conference USA Football Team
Selection	Player	Position	Year
First Team	Alex Highsmith	DE	RJR
First Team	Cameron Clark	OL	RJR
First Team	Jonathan Cruz	K	FR
First Team	Den DeLuca	DB	JR

2018 Phil Steele Publications all-Conference USA Football Team
Selection	Player	Position	Year
First Team	Benny LeMay	RB	JR
First Team	Nate Davis	OL	RSR
Second Team	Alex Highsmith	DE	RJR
Second Team	Juwan Foggie	LB	RSR
Second Team	Jonathan Cruz	K	FR
Third Team	Jeff Gemmell	LB	RJR
Third Team	Tyriq Harris	DE	RJR
Third Team	Ben DeLuca	DB	JR

=== Player gameday honors ===
Wearing Jersey #49	Position	Game
Brian McDonough	Long Snapper	Fordham
Timmy Horne	Defensive Lineman	Appalachian State
Alex Highsmith	Defensive Lineman	Old Dominion
Chris Brown	Offensive lineman	Massachusetts
Chris Phillips	Tight end	UAB
Jeff Gemmell	Linebacker	Western Kentucky
Hasaan Klugh	Quarterback	Middle Tennessee
Tyler Fain	Defensive Lineman	Southern Miss
Cameron Clark	Offensive lineman	Tennessee
Tyriq Harris	Defensive Lineman	Marshall
Nate Davis	Offensive lineman	FIU
Hasaan Klugh	Quarterback	FAU

=== Depth chart ===
Defense
4-3

FS
Ben DeLuca
A.J. McDonald
⋅

WLB	MLB	SLB
JUWAN FOGGIE	JEFF GEMMELL	ANTHONY BUTLER
Henry Segura	Will Graham	Luke Martin
⋅	B.J. Tyler	⋅

SS
ED ROLLE
Marquavis Gibbs
⋅

CB
NAFEES LYON
Christian Haynes
⋅

DE	DT	DT	DE
ALEX HIGHSMITH	TYLER FAIN	TIMMY HORNE	TYRIQ HARRIS
Michael Holmes	Dantrell Barkley	Nick Martin	Ben JACQUES
⋅	⋅	⋅	⋅

CB
D.J. ANDERSON
Denzel Irvin
⋅

Offense
Pro-style

WR
VICTOR TUCKER
Rico Arnold
Cameron Bent

Slot
MARK QUATTLEBAUM
Cameron Dollar
⋅

LT	LG	C	RG	RT
CAMERON CLARK	DARREN DRAKE	JAELIN FISHER	CHRIS BROWN	NATE DAVIS
Dejan Rasuo	Trevor Stacy	Darren Drake	Jonathan Timmons	Dominic Taylor
⋅	⋅	⋅	⋅	⋅

TE
CHRIS PHILLIPS
R.J. Tyler
⋅

WR
WORKPEH KOFA
Tyler Ringwood
⋅

QB
CHRIS REYNOLDS
Evan Sherriffs
⋅

Special teams
PK Jonathan Cruz
PK Jackson Vansickle
P Kyle Corbett
P Trey Smelcer
KR Aaron McAllister
PR Mark Quattlebaum
LS Brian McDonough
H Chris Reynolds

RB
BENNY LEMAY
Aaron McAllister
⋅

== Schedule ==
Date	Time	Opponent	Site	TV	Result	Attendance
September 1	6:00 p.m.	Fordham*	Jerry Richardson Stadium; Charlotte, NC	ESPN+	W 34–10	9,240
September 8	6:00 p.m.	Appalachian State*	Jerry Richardson Stadium; Charlotte, NC	ESPN+	L 9–45	19,151
September 13 (Note: This game was originally scheduled for September 15. It was moved up two days in anticipation of Hurricane Florence.)	4:00 p.m.	Old Dominion	Jerry Richardson Stadium; Charlotte, NC	ESPN3	W 28–25	8,204
September 22	3:30 p.m.	at UMass*	McGuirk Stadium; Hadley, MA	ELVN	L 31–49	10,086
September 29	7:00 p.m.	at UAB	Legion Field; Birmingham, AL	ESPN3	L 7–28	25,395
October 13	3:30 p.m.	Western Kentucky	Jerry Richardson Stadium; Charlotte, NC	ESPN+	W 40–14	11,610
October 20	3:00 p.m.	at Middle Tennessee	Johnny "Red" Floyd Stadium; Murfreesboro, TN	ESPN3	L 13–21	13,102
October 27	2:00 p.m.	Southern Miss^{†}	Jerry Richardson Stadium; Charlotte, NC	ESPN3	W 20–17	8,687
November 3	4:00 p.m.	at Tennessee*	Neyland Stadium; Knoxville, TN	SECN	L 3–14	86,753
November 10	2:30 p.m.	at Marshall	Joan C. Edwards Stadium; Huntington, WV	ESPN+	L 13–30	19,418
November 17	2:00 p.m.	FIU	Jerry Richardson Stadium; Charlotte, NC	ESPN3	L 35–42	13,371
November 24	6:00 p.m.	at Florida Atlantic	FAU Stadium; Boca Raton, FL	Stadium	W 27–24	11,638
*Non-conference game; ^{†}Homecoming; Rankings from AP Poll released prior to the game; All times are in Eastern time

== Television ==
Charlotte 49ers home games and conference road games will be broadcast through Conference USA's television partners ESPN, CBS Sports, Stadium, beIN, and Facebook Watch. Additional games will be available locally in the Charlotte TV market on WCCB.

== Radio ==
Radio coverage for all games is broadcast by IMG College through the Charlotte 49ers Radio Network flagship station WZGV ESPN Radio 730 AM The Game, and the TuneIn Charlotte 49ers IMG Sports Network app. The radio announcers are "Voice of the 49ers" Matt Swierad with play-by-play, former Carolina Panther Kevin Donnalley with color commentary, and Bobby Rosinski with sideline reports. Swierad and Donnalley also host the "Gold Mine Live" Coaches Show each Monday during the season at noon from Norm's in the UNC Charlotte Student Union. "Gold Mine Live" can be heard on Mondays.

== Preseason media poll ==
Conference USA released their preseason media poll on July 17, 2018, with the 49ers predicted to finish in last place in the East Division.

== Game summaries ==
=== Fordham Rams ===
Fordham at Charlotte

Team	1	2	3	4	Total
Rams	0	7	3	0	10
• 49ers	3	10	7	14	34

- Date: September 1
- Location: Jerry Richardson Stadium
  Charlotte, NC
- Game start: 7:14 pm Lightning delay (6:00 pm original time) EDT
- Elapsed time: 3:40
- Game attendance: 9,240
- Game weather: 83°F, Partly Cloudy, 3 mph ENE
- Referee: Jonathan Noli
- TV announcers (ESPN+): Bobby Rosinski, Jay Sonnhalter, Libby Clark

Scoring summary
1	4:37	CHAR	Jonathan CRUZ 24 Yd Field Goal	CHAR 3–0
2	12:49	CHAR	Jonathan CRUZ 39 Yd Field Goal	CHAR 6–0
2	11:58	FORD	Austin LONGI 70 Yd pass from Luke MEDLOCK (Andrew MEVIS Kick)	FORD 7–6
2	10:48	CHAR	Benny LEMAY 2 Yd Run (Jonathan CRUZ Kick)	CHAR 13–7
3	12:50	FORD	Andrew MEVIS 32 Yd Field Goal	CHAR 13–10
3	10:10	CHAR	Benny LEMAY 4 Yd Run (Jonathan CRUZ Kick)	CHAR 20–10
4	14:44	CHAR	Victor TUCKER 12 Yd pass from Chris REYNOLDS (Jonathan CRUZ Kick)	CHAR 27–10
4	4:34	CHAR	Juwan FOGGIE 26 Yd Interception Return (Jonathan CRUZ Kick)	CHAR 34–10

Lightning delayed the start of the game for over an hour and both teams started off slowly after the delay. Charlotte took a one score lead into the halftime period, which saw another lightning delay force a temporary evacuation of the stadium. Fordham would get the score down to a field goal difference, but the Charlotte offense would finally pull away late with three consecutive touchdowns to end the game nearly five and a half hours after its scheduled start time.

Top performances for the game were narrowly dominated by the 49ers. Quarterback Chris Reynolds threw for 267 yards and a touchdown. Rusher Benny LeMay had 25 carries for 135 yards and two touchdowns. Victor Tucker had 7 receptions for 127 yards and a touchdown.

Game notes:

- First Lightning delayed game in program history.
- First time Jerry Richardson Stadium had to be evacuated.

=== Appalachian State Mountaineers ===
Appalachaian State at Charlotte

Team	1	2	3	4	Total
• Mountaineers	10	14	7	14	45
49ers	0	9	0	0	9

- Date: September 8
- Location: Jerry Richardson Stadium
  Charlotte, NC
- Game start: 6:04 pm EDT
- Elapsed time: 2:53
- Game attendance: 19,151
- Game weather: 90°F, Party Cloudy, 0 mph
- Referee: Stephen LaManti
- TV announcers (ESPN+): Bobby Rosinski, Jay Sonnhalter, Libby Clark

Scoring summary
1	10:25	APP	Chandler STATON 31 Yd Field Goal	APP 3–0
1	1:03	APP	Zac THOMAS 5 Yd Run (Chandler STATON Kick)	APP 10–0
2	9:05	CHAR	Jonathan CRUZ 46 Yd Field Goal	APP 10–3
2	6:46	APP	Corey STATON 27 Yd pass from Zac THOMAS (Chandler STATON Kick)	APP 17–3
2	1:37	CHAR	Jonathan CRUZ 54 Yd Field Goal	APP 17–6
2	0:43	APP	Dominique HEATH 7 Yd pass from Zac THOMAS (Chandler STATON Kick)	APP 24–6
2	0:08	CHAR	Jonathan CRUZ 48 Yd Field Goal	APP 24–9
3	6:01	APP	Thomas HENNIGAN 59 Yd Punt Return (Chandler STATON Kick)	APP 31–9
4	14:45	APP	Corey STATON 90 Yd pass from Zac THOMAS (Chandler STATON Kick)	APP 38–9
4	9:28	APP	Austin EXFORD 0 Yd Fumble Return (Chandler STATON Kick)	APP 45–9

These two in-state schools met for the first time on the gridiron in this clash that saw high local interest. App, coming off a near upset win at ranked Penn State the previous weekend wanted to make a statement. They kept the Niners out of the endzone for the entire game. All nine of the Niners points came in the second quarter and from greater than 46 yards away off the foot of Jonathan Cruz. The game was still in reach at halftime, but three second half touchdowns sealed the victory for the Mountaineers.

Top performers for the game include App State quarterback Zach Thomas, who passed for 295 yards and two touchdowns. Both teams defenses were stingy on the ground. App's Jalin Moore and Charlotte's Benny LeMay had similar rushing states with Moore having 11 carries for 38 yards, and LeMay getting 35 yards on 7 carries. App's Corey Xavier Sutton had 3 receptions for 155 yards and two touchdowns.

Game notes:

- For the first time, temporary bleachers were brought in to meet high game ticket demand.
- A new Jerry Richardson Stadium attendance record was set at 19,151.
- First meeting between these in-state schools.
- Kicker Jonathan Cruz was named the Conference USA Special Teams Player of the week.

=== Old Dominion Monarchs ===
Old Dominion at Charlotte

Team	1	2	3	4	Total
Monarchs	6	6	6	7	25
• 49ers	7	6	8	7	28

- Date: September 13
- Location: Jerry Richardson Stadium
  Charlotte, NC
- Game start: 4:04 pm EDT
- Elapsed time: 2:54
- Game attendance: 8,204
- Game weather: 84°F, Mostly Cloudy, 8 mph ENE
- Referee: D. Gautreaux
- TV announcers (ESPN3): Bobby Rosinski, Jay Sonnhalter, Libby Clark

Scoring summary
1	6:03	CHAR	Victor TUCKER 18 Yd pass from Chris REYNOLDS (Jonathan CRUZ Kick)	CHAR 7–0
1	3:02	ODU	Kesean STRONG 4 Yd Run (Nick RICE PAT blocked)	CHAR 7–6
2	11:25	CHAR	Jonathan CRUZ 42 Yd Field Goal	CHAR 10–6
2	4:27	CHAR	Jonathan CRUZ 36 Yd Field Goal	CHAR 13–6
2	1:51	ODU	Lala DAVIS 20 Yd Run (Two-Point Pass Conversion Failed)	CHAR 13–12
3	12:38	ODU	Lala DAVIS 3 Yd Run (Two-Point Pass Conversion Failed)	ODU 18–13
3	6:39	CHAR	Mark QUATTLEBAUM 4 Yd pass from Chris REYNOLDS (Benny LEMAY Run for Two-Point Conversion)	CHAR 21–18
4	8:45	CHAR	Aaron MCALLISTER 14 Yd Run (Jonathan CRUZ Kick)	CHAR 28–18
4	2:57	ODU	Jonathan DUHART 2 Yd pass from Steven WILLIAMS (Nick RICE Kick)	CHAR 28–25

Due to the expected effects of Hurricane Florence along the eastern seaboard this game, originally scheduled for Saturday, September 15, was moved up two days earlier to Thursday, September 13. Both teams would trade scores throughout the game but Charlotte would finish with the most to secure the conference opener victory and end the three-game season-opening home stand at two wins, one loss.

Top performers for the game were Charlotte quarterback Chris Reynolds who threw for 202 yards and two touchdowns. Old Dominions' Lala Davis rushed for 63 yards on 25 carriers earning two touchdowns. The Monarch' Jonathan Duhart had 7 receptions for 127 yards and a touchdown.

Game notes:

- First weather advanced game in program history.
- First win for the 49ers against their C-USA East Division rival Monarchs.

=== Massachusetts Minutemen ===
Charlotte vs UMass

Team	1	2	3	4	Total
49ers	0	10	7	14	31
• Minutemen	28	7	7	7	49

- Date: September 22
- Location: McGuirk Stadium
  Amherst, MA
- Game start: 3:35 pm EDT
- Elapsed time: 3:12
- Game attendance: 10,086
- Game weather: 67°F, Overcast, 11 mph N
- Referee: Todd LaPenta
- TV announcers (ELVN): Eric Frede, Andy Gresh, Matt Neverett

Scoring summary
1	14:47	MASS	Marquis YOUNG 93 Yd Kickoff Return (Mike CAGGIANO Kick)	MASS 7–0
1	12:47	MASS	Andy Isabella 15 Yd pass from Michael CURTIS (Cooper GARCIA Kick)	MASS 14–0
1	11:46	MASS	Marquis YOUNG 2 Yd Run (Mike CAGGIANO Kick)	MASS 21–0
1	8:51	MASS	Michael CURTIS 3 Yd Run (Cooper GARCIA Kick)	MASS 28–0
2	4:37	CHAR	Benny LEMAY 1 Yd Run (Jonathan CRUZ Kick)	MASS 28–7
2	1:05	MASS	Jessie BRITT 29 Yd pass from Michael CURTIS (Cooper GARCIA Kick)	MASS 35–7
2	0:00	CHAR	Jonathan CRUZ 33 Yd Field Goal	MASS 35–10
3	7:52	MASS	Michael CURTIS 2 Yd Run (Cooper GARCIA Kick)	MASS 42–10
3	5:50	CHAR	R.J. TYLER 16 Yd pass from Chris REYNOLDS (Jonathan GARCIA Kick)	MASS 42–17
4	14:52	MASS	Marquis YOUNG 43 Yd Run (Cooper GARCIA Kick)	MASS 49–17
4	11:31	CHAR	Chris PHIPPIPS 2 Yd pass from Chris REYNOLDS (Jonathan CRUZ Kick)	MASS 49–24
4	0:22	CHAR	Cameron DOLLAR 9 Yd pass from Chris REYNOLDS (Jonathan CRUZ Kick)	MASS 49–31

Charlotte's first visit to the State of Massachusetts didn't go quite as they had planned. Giving up a devastating three touchdowns in the first three and a half minutes of the game, including an opening kickoff 93-yard return, a fumble recovery which one play later added another touchdown for the Minutemen, and a blocked punt that three plays later added the third UMass touchdown, would prove insurmountable for the Niners to overcome. Though the Niners would eventually find their offense and trade scores with the Minutement for the final three quarters of the game, the four first quarter touchdowns the Niners gave up proved to be the difference in the final score.

Top performers for the game included Charlotte quarterback Chris Reynolds, who passed for 283 yards and three touchdowns. UMass rusher Marquis Young had 12 carries for 77 yards and two touchdowns. The Minutemen's' Andy Isabella had 6 receptions for 85 yards and a touchdown.

Game notes:

First game for the program in the State of Massachusetts.

=== UAB Blazers ===
Charlotte at UAB

Team	1	2	3	4	Total
49ers	0	0	0	7	7
• Blazers	14	7	0	7	28

- Date: September 29
- Location: Legion Field
  Birmingham, AL
- Game start: 6:00 pm CDT
- Elapsed time: 2:53
- Game attendance: 25,395
- Game weather: 79°F, Cloudy, 0 mph
- Referee: Billy Williams
- TV announcers (ESPN3): Mike Grace, Chad Pilcher, Madi Morris

Scoring summary
1	11:15	UAB	Andre WILSON 35 Yd pass from A.J. ERDELY (Nick VOGEL Kick)	UAB 7–0
1	3:41	UAB	Spencer Brown 2 Yd Run (Nick VOGEL Kick)	UAB 14–0
2	4:28	UAB	A.J. ERDELY 4 Yd Run (Nick VOGEL Kick)	UAB 21–0
4	5:51	CHAR	Chris REYNOLDS 4 Yd Run (Jonathan CRUZ Kick)	UAB 21–7
4	3:30	UAB	Spencer BROWN 2 Yd Run (Nick VOGEL Kick)	UAB 28–7

Though a mostly defensive struggle, the eventual C-USA Champions never let the Niners get into their offensive groove, denying them a scoring chance until the fourth quarter. UAB would get the home win to avenge their previous season loss to the Niners, which had been the Niners' only win the previous season.

UAB quarterback A.J. Erdely passed for 214 yards and a touchdown. The Blazers' Spencer Brown had 18 carries for 68 yards and two touchdowns. Blazers' receiver Andre Wilson made the most of his two catches with 67 yards and a touchdown.

Game notes:

- First game in the State of Alabama in team history.

=== WKU Hilltoppers ===
Western Kentucky vs Charlotte

Team	1	2	3	4	Total
Hilltoppers	7	0	0	7	14
• 49ers	6	3	21	10	40

- Date: October 13
- Location: Jerry Richardson Stadium
  Charlotte, NC
- Game start: 3:35 pm EDT
- Elapsed time: 3:08
- Game attendance: 11,610
- Game weather: 70°F, Sunny, 6 mph NNW
- Referee: Jonathan Noli
- TV announcers (ESPN+): Bobby Rosinski, Jay Sonnhalter, Stormy Buonantony

Scoring summary
1	13:15	CHAR	Benny LEMAY 35 Yd Run (Two-Point Pass Conversion Failed)	CHAR 6–0
1	3:20	WKU	Kevaris THOMAS 4 Yd Run (Ryan NUSS Kick)	WKU 7–6
2	4:30	CHAR	Jonathan CRUZ 33 Yd Field Goal	CHAR 9–7
3	9:42	CHAR	Evan SHIRRIFFS 1 Yd Run (Jonathan CRUZ Kick)	CHAR 16–7
3	4:20	CHAR	Benny LEMAY 9 Yd Run (Jonathan CRUZ Kick)	CHAR 23–7
3	3:25	CHAR	Aaron MCALLISTER 14 Yd Run (Jonathan CRUZ Kick)	CHAR 30–7
4	13:57	CHAR	Jonathan CRUZ 51 Yd Field Goal	CHAR 33–7
4	5:08	CHAR	Rico ARNOLD 28 Yd pass from Evan SHIRRIFFS (Jonathan CRUZ Kick)	CHAR 40–7
4	1:55	WKU	Steven WITCHPSKEY 7 Yd pass from Steven Duncan (Ryan NUSS Kick)	CHAR 40–14

The struggling Hilltoppers rolled into Charlotte for the first time to take on the 49ers at home. The game was low scoring and close at halftime, but Charlotte soon found their offensive stride in the third quarter to put the game well out of reach.

Top performers for the game included Charlotte quarterback Chris Reynolds, who threw for 119 yards before a season-ending leg injury took him out of the game. Charlotte's Benny LeMay had 17 carries for 1231 yards and two touchdowns. Charlotte's Victor Tucker had 9 receptions for 91 yards.

Game notes:

- Linebacker Juwan Foggie was named the Conference USA Defensive Player of the Week.
- Hilltoppers first visit to Jerry Richardson Stadium.

=== Middle Tennessee Blue Raiders ===
Charlotte vs Middle Tennessee

Team	1	2	3	4	Total
49ers	6	0	0	7	13
• Blue Raiders	0	14	0	7	21

- Date: October 20
- Location: Johnny "Red" Floyd Stadium
  Murfreesboro, TN
- Game start: 2:04 pm CDT
- Elapsed time: 2:57
- Game attendance: 13,102
- Game weather: 54°F, Scattered Clounds, 10 mph WNW
- Referee: Rodney Burnette
- TV announcers (ESPN3): Jake Rose, Alex Myers, Sara Cardona

Scoring summary
1	12:58	CHAR	Benny LEMAY 57 Yd Run (Two-Point Pass Conversion Failed)	CHAR 6–0
2	6:23	MTSU	Ty LEE 29 Yd pass from Brent STOCKSTILL (Crews HOLT Kick)	MTSU 7–6
2	4:24	MTSU	Ty LEE 5 Yd pass from Brent STOCKSTILL (Crews HOLT Kick)	MTSU 14–6
4	9:29	MTSU	Gatlin CASEY 0 Yd Fumble Return (Crews HOLT Kick)	MTSU 21–6
4	1:27	CHAR	Mark QUATTLEBAUM 23 Yd pass from Evan SHIRREFFS (Jonathan CRUZ Kick)	MTSU 21–13

Charlotte would score first and take that lead into the second quarter, but by halftime the Blue Raiders would add two touchdowns of their own. Neither team found points in the third quarter but a costly Charlotte fumble on their own goal line would let the Blue Raider defense score. Charlotte would tack on another touchdown near the end of regulation but it wouldn't be enough to get a win as Charlotte's road woes continued.

Top performers included Middle Tennessee quarterback Brent Stockstill who passed for 111 yards, all three of the Blue Raiders' touchdowns, and an interception. Charlotte's Benny LeMay had 19 carries for 129 yards and a touchdown. Middle Tennessee's Ty Lee had 6 receptions for 60 yards and two touchdowns.

Game notes:

=== Southern Miss Golden Eagles ===
Southern Miss vs Charlotte

Team	1	2	3	4	Total
Golden Eagles	0	0	3	14	17
• 49ers	14	0	3	3	20

- Date: October 27
- Location: Jerry Richardson Stadium
  Charlotte, NC
- Game start: 2:05 pm EDT
- Elapsed time: 3:04
- Game attendance: 8,687
- Game weather: 51°F, Cloudy, 1 mph NW
- TV announcers (ESPN3): Bobby Rosinski, Reggie Walker, Libby Clark

Scoring summary
1	8:18	CHAR	Hasaan KLUGH 5 Yd Run (Jonathan CRUZ Kick)	CHAR 7–0
1	0:00	CHAR	Juwan FOGGIE 79 Yd Interception Return (Jonathan CRUZ Kick)	CHAR 14–0
3	10:12	CHAR	Jonathan CRUZ 40 Yd Field Goal	CHAR 17–0
3	5:58		Parker SHAUNFIELD 38 Yd Field Goal	CHAR 17–3
4	9:34	De'Michael HARRIS 43 Yd pass from Tate WHATLEY (Parker SHAUNFIELD Kick)		CHAR 17–10
4	4:19	CHAR	Jonathan CRUZ 39 Yd Field Goal	CHAR 20–10
4	1:11		Jordan MITCHELL 23 Yd pass from Tate WHATLEY (Parker SHAUNFIELD Kick)	CHAR 20–17

Charlotte would take an early two touchdown lead in the first quarter, helped by a timely Juwan Foggie interception return on what looked otherwise like a scoring drive for the Golden Eagles. Charlotte held Southern Miss scoreless at the half. Both teams would tack on field goals in the third quarter before Southern Miss finally found the endzone in the fourth quarter. The Golden Eagles would add another touchdown late in the game but a 53-yard fourth quarter field goal from Jonathan Cruz proved to be the difference maker for the Niner's to get the home win.

Top performers for the game included Southern Miss quarterback Jack Abraham, who despite throwing 3 interceptions managed to gain 210 yards for the Golden Eagle through the air. Charlotte's Benny LeMay continued his march to a 1000-yard season with 19 carries for 62 yards. The Golden Eagles' Tim Jones had 5 receptions for 96 yards.

Game notes:

- Kicker Jonathan Cruz was again named Conference USA Special Teams Player of the Week.

=== Tennessee Volunteers ===
Charlotte vs Tennessee

Team	1	2	3	4	Total
49ers	0	3	0	0	3
• Volunteers	14	0	0	0	14

- Date: November 3
- Location: Neyland Stadium
  Knoxville, TN
- Game start: 4:01 pm EDT
- Elapsed time: 3:00
- Game attendance: 86,753
- Game weather: 58°F, Sunny, 5 mph ESE
- Referee: Steve Matlowe
- TV announcers (SECN): Mike Morgan, Barrett Jones, Taylor Davis

Scoring summary
1	7:42	TENN	Marquez CALLAWAY 82 Yd Punt Return (Brent CIMAGLIA Kick)	TENN 7–0
1	0:17	TENN	Josh PALMER 16 Yd pass from Jarrett Guarantano (Brent CIMAGLIA Kick)	TENN 14–0
2	0:17	CHAR	Jonathan CRUZ 20 Yd Field Goal	TENN 14–3

Early on it looked like the game would get out of hand as the Volunteers gained a two touchdown lead in the first quarter, but Charlotte's 6th place nationally ranked run defense would hold the traditional SEC power to negative running yardage well into the fourth quarter. Tennessee would finish the game with only 20 yards on the ground, but the Tennessee defense was able to keep the Niners from finding the endzone.

Top performers of the game included Tennessee quarterback Jarrett Guarantano, who threw for 172 yards and a touchdown. Charlotte's Benny LeMay had 24 carries for 81 yards, single-handedly quadrupling the total team rushing yardage of the Volunteers. Tennessee's Josh Palmer had 5 receptions for 71 yards and a touchdown.

Game notes:

- First meeting between these two programs.
- Punter Kyle Corbett would kick a school-record 75-yarder.
- Defensive end Alex Highsmith was named Conference USA Defensive Player of the Week.

=== Marshall Thundering Herd ===
Charlotte vs Marshall

Team	1	2	3	4	Total
49ers	7	0	0	7	14
• Thundering Herd	6	3	21	10	40

- Date: November 10
- Location: Joan C. Edwards Stadium
  Huntington, WV
- Game start: 2:36 pm EST
- Elapsed time: 2:52
- Game attendance: 19,418
- Game weather: 39°F, Sunny, 8 mph WNW
- Referee: Jonathan Noli
- TV announcers (ESPN+): Jake Griffith; Mark Martin

Scoring summary
1	8:42	CHAR	Evan SHIRREFFS 1 Yd Run (Jonathan CRUZ Kick)	CHAR 7–0
1	5:00	MARSH	Justin ROHRWASSER 23 Yd Field Goal	CHAR 7–3
1	2:34	MARSH	Anthony ANDERSON 1 Yd Run (Justin ROHRWASSER Kick)	MARSH 7–10
2	4:21	MARSH	Justin ROHRWASSER 33 Yd Field Goal	MARSH 13–7
2	0:00	CHAR	Jonathan CRUZ 40 Yd Field Goal	MARSH 13–10
3	13:48	CHAR	Jonathan CRUZ 35 Yd Field Goal	TIED 13–13
3	9:59	MARSH	Brenden KNOX 4 Yd Run (Justin ROHRWASSER Kick)	MARSH 20–13
3	4:39	MARSH	Justin ROHRWASSER 23 Yd Field Goal	MARSH 23–13
3	0:37	MARSH	Obi OBIALO 10 Yd pass from Isaiah GREEN (Justin ROHRWASSER Kick)	MARSH 30–13

The game would stay a tight scoring affair with the Niner's evening the game up early in the third quarter, But Marshall would add two touchdowns and a field goal before the end of the quarter to earn the home victory and keeping the Niners winless on the road for the season.

Top performances for the game were Marshall quarterback Isaiah Green, with 178 passing yards and a touchdown. The Herd's Brendan Knox had 22 carries for 116 yards and a touchdown. Thundering Herd receiver Tyre Brady had 6 receptions for 95 yards.

Game notes:

=== FIU Panthers ===
FIU vs Charlotte

Team	1	2	3	4	Total
• FIU	10	10	7	15	42
49ers	7	7	7	14	35

- Date: November 17
- Location: Jerry Richardson Stadium
  Charlotte, NC
- Game start: 2:05 pm EDT
- Elapsed time: 3:08
- Game attendance: 13,371
- Game weather: 60°F, Sunny, 3 mph E
- Referee: Steven LaMantia
- TV announcers (ESPN3): Bobby Rosinski, Jay Sonnhalter, Libby Clark

Scoring summary
1	12:49	CHAR	Benny LEMAY 9 Yd Run (Jonathan CRUZ Kick)	CHAR 7–0
1	8:49	FIU	José Borregales 25 Yd Field Goal	CHAR 7–3
1	5:33	FIU	Sage LEWIS 61 Yd Fumble Return (José BORREGALES Kick)	FIU 10–7
2	12:03	FIU	José BORREGALES 28 Yd Field Goal	FIU 13–7
2	9:37	CHAR	Benny LEMAY 1 Yd Run (Jonathan CRUZ Kick)	CHAR 14–13
2	3:38	FIU	Napoleon MAXWELL 39 Yd Run (José BORREGALES Kick)	FIU 20–14
3	12:54	FIU	Anthony JONES 6 Yd pass from James MORGAN (José BORREGALES Kick)	FIU 27–14
3	4:33	CHAR	Benny LEMAY 1 Yd Run (Jonathan CRUZ Kick)	FIU 27–21
4	14:56	FIU	Anthony JONES 3 Yd pass from James MORGAN (James MORGAN Pass to Tony GAITER IV for Two-Point Conversion)	FIU 35–21
4	9:33	CHAR	Benny LEMAY 6 Yd Run (Jonathan CRUZ Kick)	FIU 35–28
4	7:04	FIU	Napoleon MAXWELL 52 Yd Run (José BORREGALES Kick)	FIU 42–28
4	1:14	CHAR	Chris PHILLIPS 12 Yd pass from Hasaan KLUGH (Jonathan CRUZ Kick)	FIU 42–35

With the Panthers still in the hunt for the East Division crown and a chance to make the Conference USA Championship Game on the line, the 49ers faced a tall order on Senior Day. The two teams would trade leads with the Panthers heading in at the half with a one score lead. Despite a dominating ground performance from Charlotte rusher Benny LeMay, the Niners wouldn't find the lead again, but always managed to keep it within one score. A final on-sides recovery attempt failed and the Niners lost their second and last home game of the season.

Top performers for the game included Panthers' quarterback James Morgan, who threw for 268 yards and 2 touchdowns. Charlotte's Benny LeMay would rack up four touchdowns and 159 yards on 30 carries. Charlotte's Victor Tucker had 4 receptions for 115 yards.

Game notes:

- Benny LeMay would tie the single-game scoring record held by receiver Austin Duke of four touchdowns.
- LeMay would become the second 49er with a 1000-yard season, joining Kalif Phillips.
- LeMay also broke the 49ers' single-season rushing record as members of FBS.
- Head Coach Brad Lambert was released following the game and the Niner's elimination from bowl eligibility. He would coach the Niners in the final game of the season on the road at FAU.

=== Florida Atlantic Owls ===
Charlotte vs Florida Atlantic

Team	1	2	3	4	Total
• 49ers	10	0	7	10	27
Owls	7	14	0	3	24

- Date: November 24
- Location: FAU Stadium
  CBoca Raton, FL
- Game start: 6:06 pm EST
- Elapsed time: 3:05
- Game attendance: 11,638
- Game weather: 84°F, Partly Cloudy, 17 mph WSW
- TV announcers (Stadium/WCCB): Chris Hassel, Max Starks, Kristen Balboni

Scoring summary
1	14:47	FAU	Kerrith Whyte 75 Yd pass from Chris ROBINSON (Vladimir RIVAS Kick)	FAU 7–0
1	9:52	CHAR	Mark QUATTLEBAUM 12 Yd pass from Hasaan KLUGH (Jonathan CRUZ Kick)	TIED 7–7
1	2:03	CHAR	Jonathan CRUZ 30 Yd Field Goal	CHAR 10–7
2	3:29	FAU	John RAINE 23 Yd pass from Chris ROBINSON (Vladimir RIVAS Kick)	FAU 14–10
2	0:46	FAU	Chris ROBINSON 4 Yd Run (Vladimir RIVAS Kick)	FAU 21–10
3	8:27	CHAR	Benny LEMAY 54 Yd Run (Jonathan CRUZ Kick)	FAU 21–17
4	14:21	CHAR	Hasaan KLUGH 13 Yd Run (Jonathan CRUZ Kick)	CHAR 24–21
4	3:12	FAU	Vladimir RIVAS 33 Yd Field Goal	TIED 24–24
4	0:25	CHAR	Jonathan CRUZ 56 Yd Field Goal	CHAR 27–24

The defending Conference USA Champions were looking to extend their season by becoming bowl eligible off of a fifth straight win. The Niners were looking for their first road win and to send their seniors and their head coach out as victors. It looked like the Owls would have the upper hand early when they scored on the very first play from scrimmage, however the Niners would have the lead heading into the second quarter. The Owls had their biggest lead of the game heading into halftime, but in the second half Charlotte would battle back to retake the lead early in the fourth quarter. The Owls would tie the game up with a little more than three minutes left on the clock, but Charlotte kicker and two time Conference USA Special Teams Player of the Week Jonathan Cruz would hit a decisive 56-yard field goal with under half a minute left on the clock to give the Niners their only road win of the season.

Top performers of the game included Florida Atlantic passer Chris Robinson who threw for 273 yards and 2 touchdowns. Charlotte's Benny LeMay capped a stellar season with 24 carries for 173 yards and a touchdown. The Owls' Kerrith Whyte Jr. had 3 receptions for 92 yards and a touchdown.

Game notes:

- The win gave Lambert his final victory as Charlotte 49ers head coach with an overall record of 22–48 in his six seasons (9–31 against FBS opponents).
- Jonathan Cruz's two 50+ yard field goals, including the game-winner, earned him an unprecedented third Conference USA Special Teams Player of the Week honor.
- Defensive end Alex Highsmith tied Larry Ogunjobi's single-game tackles for loss mark at 4.5 TFL's.
- Highsmith broke Ogunjobi's single-season TFL record with 17.5 TFL's.
- Highsmith was named to the Pro Football Focus National Defensive Team of the Week and the College Sports Madness Conference USA Defensive Player of the Week.
- Benny LeMay finished the season with 2135 all-purpose yards (1128 rushing, 1007 receiving).

== Attendance ==
Season	Games	Sellouts	W–L (%)	Attendance	Average	Best
2018	6	1	4–2 (.667)	70,263	11,710	19,151

== Players drafted into the NFL ==
Round	Pick	Player	Position	NFL club
3	82	Nate Davis	G	Tennessee Titans
