= 2019 Charlotte 49ers football team =

American college football season

2019 Charlotte 49ers football
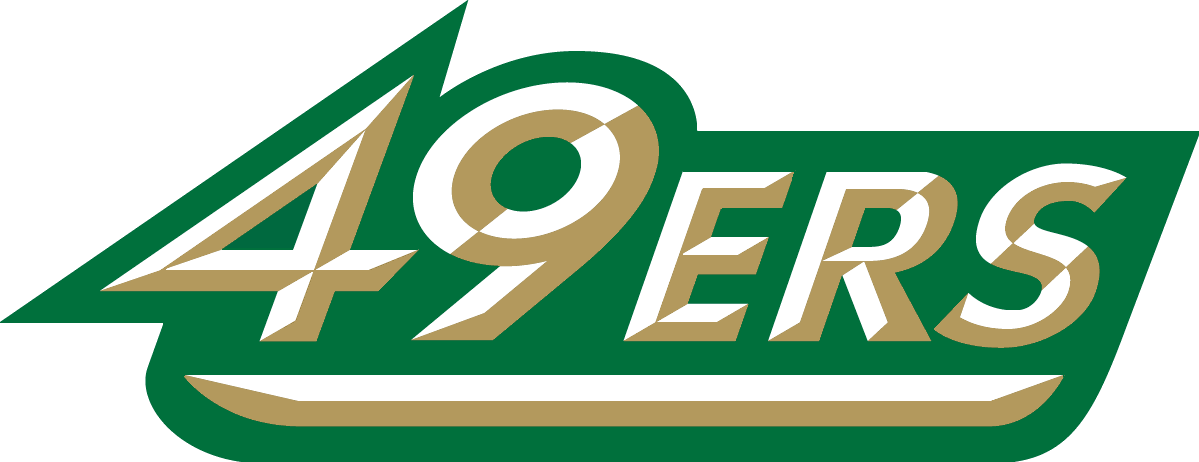

Bahamas Bowl, L 9–31 vs. Buffalo
- Conference: Conference USA
- East Division
- Record: 7–6 (5–3 C-USA)
- Head coach: Will Healy (1st season)
- Offensive coordinator: Alex Atkins (1st season)
- Offensive scheme: Spread option
- Co-defensive coordinators: Brandon Cooper (1st season); Marcus West (1st season)
- Base defense: 4–2–5
- Home stadium: Jerry Richardson Stadium

2019 Conference USA football standings
| | Conf. | | | Overall |
| Team | W | | L | W | | L |
|---|---|---|---|---|---|---|
East Division
| Florida Atlantic xy$ | 7 | – | 1 | 11 | – | 3 |
| Marshall | 6 | – | 2 | 8 | – | 5 |
| Western Kentucky | 6 | – | 2 | 9 | – | 4 |
| Charlotte | 5 | – | 3 | 7 | – | 6 |
| Middle Tennessee | 3 | – | 5 | 4 | – | 8 |
| FIU | 3 | – | 5 | 6 | – | 7 |
| Old Dominion | 0 | – | 8 | 1 | – | 11 |
West Division
| UAB xy | 6 | – | 2 | 9 | – | 5 |
| Louisiana Tech x | 6 | – | 2 | 10 | – | 3 |
| Southern Miss | 5 | – | 3 | 7 | – | 6 |
| North Texas | 3 | – | 5 | 4 | – | 8 |
| UTSA | 3 | – | 5 | 4 | – | 8 |
| Rice | 3 | – | 5 | 3 | – | 9 |
| UTEP | 0 | – | 8 | 1 | – | 11 |
Championship: Florida Atlantic 49, UAB 6
$ – Conference champion; x – Division champion/co-champions; y – Championship game participant

The 2019 Charlotte 49ers football team represented the University of North Carolina at Charlotte in the 2019 NCAA Division I FBS football season. The 49ers played their home games at Jerry Richardson Stadium in Charlotte, NC, and competed in the East Division of Conference USA (C–USA). They were led by first-year head coach Will Healy.

== Coaching staff ==
Following the loss of the final home game of the 2018 season to FIU and elimination from bowl game contention, first-year athletic director Mike Hill released head coach Brad Lambert from his contract. Lambert finished the season and his Charlotte 49ers career with a road victory against FAU the following Saturday. On December 5, 2018 Austin Peay third-year head coach Will Healy was introduced as the Charlotte 49ers second head football coach.

On December 21, Austin Peay's defensive coordinator Brandon Cooper was named co-defensive coordinator and safeties coach. Also coming over on the same date from Austin Peay was Max Thurmond who would take over the same positions of special teams coordinator and linebackers coach. Virginia State offensive coordinator Mark Carrey was named quarterbacks coach. Southern Miss cornerbacks coach Eddie Hicks would take the same position on Healy's new staff. Carter Crutchfield would also follow Healy from Austin Peay to continue as his recruiting coordinator and director of operations. Rounding out the first round of staff hires would be Chris Laskowski, who maintained the same position he had under Healy at Austin Peay of strength and conditioning coach.

On December 23 Tulane assistant head coach, offensive coordinator and offensive line coach Alex Atkins was named offensive coordinator and offensive line coach. On January 8, 2019 Minnesota Defensive line coach Marcus West was reported as taking the same position with the 49ers and also joining Cooper as co-defensive coordinators. In addition Healy named West, who had previously been on Healy's staff at Austin Peay, to assistant head coach. On the same date Troy running backs coach Sean Dawkins was named running backs coach and run game coordinator.

On January 28, Western Kentucky running backs coach Montario Hardesty joined the staff to coach wide receivers. On February 21 Clemson graduate assistant Zachary Alley joined the staff to coach nickelbacks. On March 1 Oregon graduate assistant Cody Woodiel was hired to coach tight ends, completing Healy's first coaching staff at Charlotte.

Alley would depart from the staff shortly after his hire to join the Boise State staff as inside linebackers coach.

On June 24 Asheville's Christ School's head football coach Tommy Langford accepted the nicklebacks assistant coaching position.

| Name | Position | Seasons at Charlotte | Alma mater |
| Will Healy | Head coach | 1 | Richmond (2008) |
| Marcus West | Assistant head coach/co-defensive coordinator/defensive line | 1 | Memphis (2005) |
| Alex Atkins | Offensive coordinator/offensive line | 1 | UT Martin (2007) |
| Brandon Cooper | Co-defensive coordinator/safeties | 1 | UT Martin (2007) |
| Mark Carney | Quarterbacks coach | 1 | Fordham (2004) |
| Sean Dawkins | Running backs coach/run game coordinator | 1 | Troy (2007) |
| Montario Hardesty | Wide receivers coach | 1 | Tennessee (2010) |
| Eddie Hicks | Cornerbacks coach | 1 | So Miss (2010) |
| Tommy Langford | Nicklebacks coach | 1 | Minn. State (2015) |
| Max Thurmond | Linebackers/special teams coach | 1 | Jacksonville St. (2001) |
| Cody Woodiel | Tight ends coach | 1 | Troy (2012) |

== Recruiting ==
=== Recruiting class ===
The following recruits have signed letters of intent or verbally committed to the Charlotte 49ers football program for the 2019 recruiting year.

College recruiting (2019)
| Name | Hometown | School | Height | Weight | 40^{‡} | Commit date |
|---|---|---|---|---|---|---|
| Peter Agabe; LB | Milledgeville, GA | ASA College Miami, FL | 6 ft 2 in (1.88 m) | 225 lb (102 kg) | - | Nov 18, 2018 |
| Peter Agabe; LB | Recruit ratings: Scout: Rivals: 247Sports: | | | | | |
| Prince Bemah; LB | Gastonia, NC | Hunter Huss | 5 ft 11 in (1.80 m) | 218 lb (99 kg) | - | Feb 6, 2019 |
| Prince Bemah; LB | Recruit ratings: Rivals: | | | | | |
| Trey Bly; CB | Charlotte, NC | Myers Park | 5 ft 8 in (1.73 m) | 145 lb (66 kg) | - | Jul 20, 2018 |
| Trey Bly; CB | Recruit ratings: Scout: Rivals: 247Sports: ESPN: | | | | | |
| Jamel Brown; S | Las Vegas, NV | Desert Pines | 5 ft 11 in (1.80 m) | 192 lb (87 kg) | - | Jan 21, 2019 |
| Jamel Brown; S | Recruit ratings: Scout: Rivals: 247Sports: | | | | | |
| Micaleous Elder; WR | Murfreesboro, TN | Blackman | 5 ft 9 in (1.75 m) | 165 lb (75 kg) | - | Feb 6, 2019 |
| Micaleous Elder; WR | Recruit ratings: Scout: Rivals: 247Sports: | | | | | |
| Tre Goode; ATH | Jamestown, NC | Lucy Ragsdale | 6 ft 3 in (1.91 m) | 180 lb (82 kg) | - | Aug 19, 2018 |
| Tre Goode; ATH | Recruit ratings: Scout: Rivals: 247Sports: | | | | | |
| Noah Henderson; WR | Nashville, TN | Ed White | 6 ft 1 in (1.85 m) | 195 lb (88 kg) | - | Feb 6, 2019 |
| Noah Henderson; WR | Recruit ratings: Scout: Rivals: 247Sports: | | | | | |
| Jaxon Hughes; DE | Greensboro, NC | Northern Guilford | 6 ft 5 in (1.96 m) | 250 lb (110 kg) | - | Dec 19, 2018 |
| Jaxon Hughes; DE | Recruit ratings: Scout: 247Sports: | | | | | |
| Yontez Jarrell; OL | Jacksonville, FL | Ed White | 6 ft 6 in (1.98 m) | 265 lb (120 kg) | - | Dec 19, 2018 |
| Yontez Jarrell; OL | Recruit ratings: Scout: Rivals: 247Sports: | | | | | |
| Michael Kelly; DE | Graham, NC | Graham High School | 6 ft 3 in (1.91 m) | 225 lb (102 kg) | - | Aug 9, 2018 |
| Michael Kelly; DE | Recruit ratings: Scout: Rivals: 247Sports: | | | | | |
| Quinton Patten; WR | Blythewood, SC | Blythewood | 6 ft 0 in (1.83 m) | 185 lb (84 kg) | - | Dec 19, 2018 |
| Quinton Patten; WR | Recruit ratings: Scout: Rivals: 247Sports: | | | | | |
| Rhett Read; TE | Buffalo, TX | Blinn College | 6 ft 4 in (1.93 m) | 240 lb (110 kg) | - | Dec 19, 2018 |
| Rhett Read; TE | Recruit ratings: Scout: Rivals: 247Sports: | | | | | |
| Solomon Rogers; DB | Rolesville, NC | Rolesville | 6 ft 0 in (1.83 m) | 180 lb (82 kg) | - | Dec 19, 2018 |
| Solomon Rogers; DB | Recruit ratings: Scout: 247Sports: | | | | | |
| Jaylon Sharpe; LB | Charlotte, NC | Rocky River | 6 ft 3 in (1.91 m) | 225 lb (102 kg) | - | Nov 10, 2018 |
| Jaylon Sharpe; LB | Recruit ratings: Scout: Rivals: 247Sports: ESPN: | | | | | |
| Bryson Whitehead; DB | Cornelius, NC | Hough | 5 ft 11 in (1.80 m) | 180 lb (82 kg) | - | Dec 14, 2018 |
| Bryson Whitehead; DB | Recruit ratings: Scout: Rivals: 247Sports: | | | | | |
| Jaylan Williams; TE | Acworth, GA | Allatoona | 6 ft 4 in (1.93 m) | 220 lb (100 kg) | - | Feb 6, 2019 |
| Jaylan Williams; TE | Recruit ratings: Scout: 247Sports: | | | | | |
Overall recruit ranking: Scout: 133 Rivals: N/A 247Sports: 133 ESPN: N/A
‡ Refers to 40-yard dash; Note: In many cases, Scout, Rivals, 247Sports, On3, and ESPN may conflict in their listings of height, weight and 40 time.; In these cases, the average was taken. ESPN grades are on a 100-point scale.; Sources: "Charlotte Football Commitments". Rivals.; "2019 Charlotte Football Commits". Scout.; "ESPN". ESPN.; "Scout.com Team Recruiting Rankings". Scout.; "2019 Team Ranking". Rivals.com.

=== Key Transfers ===
| Player | Position | Previous | Home town | High school | Class | Height | Weight |
| Brelin Faison-Walden | Linebacker | Penn State | Greensboro, NC | Grimsley HS | SR | 6'-1" | 200 lbs |
| Brett Kean | Quarterback | S. Florida | Lakewood, OH | St. Edward HS | GR | 6'-1" | 221 lbs |
| Marquill Osborne | Cornerback | Tennessee | Cornelius, NC | Hough HS | SR | 5'-11" | 190 lbs |
| Christian Roberson | Tight end | Miss. State | Powder Springs, GA | McEachern HS | SR | 6'-6" | 230 lbs |

== Players ==
=== Roster ===
2019 Charlotte 49ers football team roster
Players
Coaches
Offense

| Pos. | # | Name | Class |
|---|---|---|---|
| WR | 1 | Micaleous Elder | Fr |
| WR | 2 | Cameron Bent | RFr |
| QB | 3 | Chris Reynolds | RSo |
| WR | 4 | Cameron Dollar | RSo |
| RB | 5 | Arron McAllister | RJr |
| WR | 6 | Tre’ Goode | Fr |
| QB | 7 | Brett Kean | RSr |
| QB | 8 | Willie Taylor | Fr |
| WR | 9 | Victor Tucker | RSo |
| QB | 10 | Daniel Ratliff | RFr |
| QB | 11 | Preston Brown | Fr |
| QB | 12 | Willie Green | RSo |
| RB | 13 | Terrick Smalls Jr. | RFr |
| WR | 14 | Joe Thompson | RJr |
| WR | 15 | Justin Jeffrey | RFr |
| QB | 16 | Evan Shirreffs (injured) | RSr |
| QB | 17 | Ford Werness | RFr |
| QB | 19 | Kyle Holcomb | Fr |
| WR | 20 | Kendric Blake | Fr |
| WR | 21 | Rico Arnold (injured) | So |
| RB | 23 | Jamel Brown | Fr |
| RB | 24 | Malachi Rennix | Fr |
| WR | 25 | Noah Henderson | Fr |
| RB | 26 | Caleb Parker | RFr |
| RB | 29 | Calvin Camp | RSo |
| RB | 30 | Ishod Finger | RFr |
| RB | 32 | Benny LeMay (C) | Sr |
| TE | 38 | Jaylen Williams | Fr |
| OL | 53 | Jalen Allen | RSr |
| OL | 54 | Dominic Taylor | Sr |
| OL | 55 | Michael Adams | RSo |
| OL | 57 | Brady Alls | Fr |
| OL | 62 | Austin Lee | RJr |
| OL | 63 | Jacob Webb | RSo |
| OL | 68 | Jaelin Fisher | RJr |
| OL | 69 | Dejan Rasuo | RFr |
| OL | 70 | D'Mitri Emmanuel | RSo |
| OL | 71 | Cameron Clark (C) | RSr |
| OL | 72 | Gage Welborn | RFr |
| OL | 73 | Yontez Jarrell | Fr |
| OL | 75 | Jonathan Timmons | RJr |
| OL | 77 | Malik Harkness | RFr |
| TE | 80 | Christian Roberson | RSr |
| WR | 81 | Tyler Ringwood | RJr |
| WR | 82 | Zach Gemmell | RSo |
| WR | 83 | Chris Wiggins | RFr |
| TE | 84 | Rhett Read | Jr |
| TE | 85 | Ryan Carriere | RJr |
| TE | 86 | Moss Saccomanno | RSo |
| TE | 88 | Jacob Hunt | So |
| WR | 89 | Quinton Patten | Fr |

Defense

| Pos. | # | Name | Class |
|---|---|---|---|
| DB | 1 | Jacione Fugate | RJr |
| LB | 2 | Brelin Faison-Walden | Jr |
| LB | 3 | Darius Irvin | RSr |
| LB | 4 | Lance McMillian | RFr |
| LB | 5 | Alex Highsmith (C) | RSr |
| DB | 6 | Marquill Osborne | Sr |
| LB | 7 | Anthony Butler | Sr |
| DB | 8 | Nafees Lyon | RSr |
| DE | 10 | Tyriq Harris (injured) (C) | RSr |
| DB | 12 | Christian Haynes | RSr |
| DB | 15 | Marquavis Gibbs | Sr |
| LB | 17 | Luke Martin | Jr |
| LB | 18 | Prince Bemah (injured) | Fr |
| DB | 20 | D.J. Anderson | RSr |
| DB | 22 | Henry Segura | RSo |
| DB | 23 | Matt Martinez | RFr |
| DB | 24 | Soloman Rogers | Fr |
| DB | 27 | Bryson Whitehead | Fr |
| DB | 28 | Ben DeLuca (injured) (C) | Sr |
| DB | 29 | Jonnie Pitman | RFr |
| DB | 31 | Trey Bly | Fr |
| DB | 31 | Kendric Ivey | So |
| LB | 33 | Jaylon Sharpe | Fr |
| LB | 34 | Jeff Gemmell (C) | RSr |
| DB | 35 | Lacy Williams | Fr |
| DB | 36 | Robert Cheatem | RJr |
| LB | 39 | George Maya | RSo |
| LB | 40 | Markees Watts | So |
| LB | 42 | Tiaseer Rambert | Fr |
| DB | 43 | Ryan Braithwaite | RSo |
| DE | 44 | Jaxon Hughes | Fr |
| LB | 45 | Javonte Misenheimer | RSo |
| LB | 46 | Dillon Overholt | RFr |
| DL | 48 | Michael Kelly | Fr |
| LB | 50 | John Thierfelder | RSo |
| LB | 51 | Peter Agabe | Fr |
| LB | 52 | Matthew Longley | RJr |
| LB | 56 | Will Graham | RJr |
| DL | 58 | Johnny Ray | RJr |
| LB | 59 | B.J. Turner | RFr |
| DL | 60 | Bryan Wallace | RFr |
| DL | 74 | Tim Baten | RSo |
| DE | 86 | Antonie Shaw | RSo |
| DL | 87 | Isaiah Harris | RSr |
| DL | 90 | Tommy Doctor | RSr |
| DE | 91 | Corey Mobley | RJr |
| DL | 92 | Desmond Stewart | Jr |
| DE | 93 | Emmanuel White | RSo |
| DE | 94 | Isaiah Belk | RFr |
| DE | 96 | Jaison Williams | Sr |
| DE | 97 | Damon Weldon Jr. | RFr |
| DL | 98 | Timmy Horne | RJr |
| DE | 99 | Taylor Chandler | RFr |

Special teams

| Pos. | # | Name | Class |
|---|---|---|---|
| K | 11 | Jonathan Cruz | So |
| K | 18 | Jackson Vansickle | RSr |
| P | 19 | Connor Bowler | RSo |
| LS | 35 | Josh Tilque | RFr |
| K | 37 | Max Bilstein | Fr |
| P/K | 39 | Kyle Corbett | RJr |
| K | 41 | Christian Kaplan | Fr |
| LS | 47 | Jack Wellenhofer | RJr |
| LS | 61 | Doug McLaughlin | Fr |
| K | 95 | Andrew Favaro | RSo |

Head coach

- Will Healy (Richmond)

Coordinators/assistant coaches

- Marcus West (Memphis)
  Assistant head coach/co-defensive coordinator/defensive line
- Alex Atkins (UT Martin)
  Offensive coordinator/offensive line
- Brandon Cooper (UT Martin)
  Co-defensive coordinator/safeties
- Mark Carney (Fordham)
  Quarterbacks
- Sean Dawkins (Troy)
  Run Game Coordinator/running backs
- Montario Hardesty (Tennessee)
  Receivers
- Eddie Hicks (Southern Miss)
  Cornerbacks
- Tommy Langford (Minnesota State)
  Nicklebacks
- Max Thurmond (Jacksonville State)
  Linebackers/special teams
- Cody Woodiel (Troy)
  Tight ends

Legend

- (C) Team captain
- (S) Suspended
- (I) Ineligible
- Injured
- Redshirt

Roster
Last update: August 26, 2019

=== Depth chart ===
Defense
4-2-5

S
JONNIE PITMAN
Christian Haynes
Dillon Overholt

FS
Ben DeLuca
Jacione Fugate
⋅

| WLB | SLB |
|---|---|
| HENRY SEGURA | JEFF GEMMELL |
| Prince Bemah | Jaylon Sharpe |
| ⋅ | ⋅ |

SS
MARQUAVIS GIBBS
Matt Martinez
⋅

CB
NAFEES LYON
Lance McMillillan
⋅

| DE | DT | DT | DE |
|---|---|---|---|
| ALEX HIGHSMITH | TOMMY DOCTOR | DEMOND STEWART | TYRIQ HARRIS |
| Damon Weldon Jr. | Johnny Ray | Timmy Horn | Markees Watts |
| Michael Kelly | ⋅ | ⋅ | ⋅ |

CB
MARQUILL OSBORNE
D. J. Anderson
⋅

Offense
Pro-style

WR
VICTOR TUCKER
Justin Jeffrey
Tre’ Goode

Slot
CAMERON DOLLAR
Micaleous Elder
Cam Bent

| LT | LG | C | RG | RT |
|---|---|---|---|---|
| CAMERON CLARK | DOMINIC TAYLOR | JAELIN FISHER | JALEN ALLEN | D’MITRI EMMANUEL |
| Dejan Rasuo | Jonathan Timmons | Gage Welborn | Dominic Taylor | Malik Harkness |
| ⋅ | ⋅ | ⋅ | ⋅ | ⋅ |

TE
JACOB HUNT
Christian Roberson
⋅

WR
TYLER RINGWOOD
Noah Henderson
⋅

QB
CHRIS REYNOLDS
BRETT KEAN
⋅

Special teams
PK Jonathan Cruz
PK Jackson Vansickle
P Connor Bowler
P Kyle Corbett

LS Jack Wellenhofer

RB
BENNY LEMAY
Aaron McAllister
⋅

== Awards and honors ==
=== Preseason ===
| Awards Watch List | Player | Position | Year |
|---|---|---|---|
| Bednarik Award | Alex Highsmith | DE | RSR |
| Doak Walker Award | Benny LeMay | RB | SR |
| Rimington Trophy | Jaelin Fisher | C | RJR |
| Groza Award | Jonathan Cruz | K | SO |
| Wuerffel Trophy | Tyriq Harris | DE | RSR |
| Allstate AFCA Good Works Team | Tyriq Harris | DE | RSR |

| Preseason All-CUSA Team | Player | Position | Year |
|---|---|---|---|
| Preseason Conference USA Special Teams Player of the Year | Jonathan Cruz | K | SO |
| Preseason All-Conference USA First Team | Jonathan Cruz | K | SO |
| Preseason All-Conference USA First Team | Alex Highsmith | DE | RSR |
| Preseason All-Conference USA First Team | Benny LeMay | RB | SR |

=== In season ===
| Awards Watch List | Player | Position | Year |
|---|---|---|---|
| Campbell Trophy | Tyriq Harris | DE | RSR |
| Burlsworth Trophy | Alex Highsmith | DE | RSR |

| Award | Player | Position | Year | Game |
|---|---|---|---|---|
| Conference USA Offensive Player of the Week | Chris Reynolds | QB | RSO | North Texas |
| Conference USA Offensive Player of the Week | Victor Tucker | WR | SO | Marshall |
| Conference USA Defensive Player of the Week | Alex Highsmith | DE | RSR | Old Dominion |

| Wearing Jersey #49 | Position | Game |
| Christian Haynes | Defensive back | Gardner-Webb |
| B. J. Turner | Linebacker | Appalachian State |
| Peter Agabe | Linebacker | Massachusetts |
| Jaelin Fisher | Offensive lineman | Clemson |
| Gage Welborn | Offensive lineman | Florida Atlantic |
| Ryan Carriere | Tight end | Florida International |
| Dillon Overholt | Linebacker | Western Kentucky |
| Taylor Chandler | Defensive end | North Texas |
| Markees Watts | Defensive end | Middle Tennessee |
| Jalen Allen | Offensive lineman | UTEP |
| Isaiah Harris | Tight end | Marshall |
| | | Old Dominion |
| Cameron Clark | Offensive lineman | Buffalo (Bahamas Bowl) |

=== Postseason ===
2019 All-American Football Team
| Selection | Player | Position | Year | Authority |
|---|---|---|---|---|
| Third Team | Alex Highsmith | DE | RSR | PFF |
| Second Team | Alex Highsmith | DE | RSR | SI |
| Third Team | Alex Highsmith | DE | RSR | AP |

| Conference Award | Player | Position | Year |
|---|---|---|---|
| C-USA All-Academic Team | Connor Bowler | P | RSO |
| C-USA All-Conference First Team | Benny LeMay | RB | SR |
| C-USA All-Conference First Team | Cameron Clark | OL | RSR |
| C-USA All-Conference First Team | Alex Highsmith | DE | RSR |
| C-USA All-Freshman Team | Dejan Rasuo | OL | FR |
| C-USA All-Freshman Team | Lance McMillan | DB | FR |

All Conference Honorable Mentions:

Offense: QB – Chris Reynolds, R-So. • WR – Victor Tucker, R-So.

Defense: DE – Markees Watts, So. • LB – Jeff Gemmell, R-Sr. • DB – Nafees Lyon, R-Sr.

2020 East–West Shrine Bowl:

Participants: RB - Benny LeMay (Shrine Game MVP) • OL - Cameron Clark • DE - Alex Highsmith

== Schedule ==
| Date | Time | Opponent | Site | TV | Result | Attendance |
|---|---|---|---|---|---|---|
| August 29 | 7:30 pm | Gardner–Webb* | Jerry Richardson Stadium; Charlotte, NC | ESPN+ | W 49–28 | 16,119 |
| September 7 | 3:30 pm | at Appalachian State* | Kidd Brewer Stadium; Boone, NC | ESPN+ | L 41–56 | 29,182 |
| September 14 | 6:00 pm | UMass* | Jerry Richardson Stadium; Charlotte, NC | ESPN3 | W 52–17 | 12,812 |
| September 21 | 7:30 p.m. | at No. 1 Clemson* | Memorial Stadium; Clemson, SC | ACCN | L 10–52 | 81,500 |
| September 28 | 3:30 pm | Florida Atlantic^{†} | Jerry Richardson Stadium; Charlotte, NC | NFLN | L 27–45 | 12,334 |
| October 12 | 7:00 p.m. | at FIU | Riccardo Silva Stadium; Miami, FL | ESPN+ | L 23–48 | 16,834 |
| October 19 | 4:00 p.m. | at Western Kentucky | Houchens Industries–L. T. Smith Stadium; Bowling Green, KY | ESPN+ | L 14–30 | 15,816 |
| October 26 | 3:30 pm | North Texas | Jerry Richardson Stadium; Charlotte, NC | ESPN+ | W 39–38 | 8,245 |
| November 2 | 3:30 pm | Middle Tennessee | Jerry Richardson Stadium; Charlotte, NC | ESPN3 | W 34–20 | 13,879 |
| November 9 | 3:00 p.m. | at UTEP | Sun Bowl; El Paso, TX | ESPN+ | W 28–21 | 15,683 |
| November 23 | 3:30 pm | Marshall | Jerry Richardson Stadium; Charlotte, NC | Stadium, Facebook Live | W 24–13 | 10,526 |
| November 30 | 2:00 p.m. | at Old Dominion | S.B. Ballard Stadium; Norfolk, VA (Oyster Bowl) | ESPN+ | W 38–22 | 16,369 |
| December 20 | 2:00 p.m. | vs. Buffalo* | Thomas Robinson Stadium; Nassau, Bahamas (Bahamas Bowl) | ESPN | L 9–31 | 13,547 |
*Non-conference game; ^{†}Homecoming; Rankings from AP Poll and CFP Rankings after November 5 released prior to game; All times are in Eastern time

== Television ==
Charlotte 49ers home games and conference road games will be broadcast through Conference USA's television partners ESPN, CBS Sports, Stadium, NFL Network, and Facebook Watch. Additional games will be available locally in the Charlotte TV market on WCCB.

== Radio ==
Radio coverage for all games is broadcast by IMG College through the Charlotte 49ers Radio Network flagship station WZGV ESPN Radio 730 AM The Game, and the TuneIn Charlotte 49ers IMG Sports Network app. The radio announcers are "Voice of the 49ers" Matt Swierad with play-by-play alongside NFL veteran Al Wallace providing color commentary and Bobby Rosinski and Walker Mehl with sideline reports. Swierad also hosts the "Niners Live" Coaches Show each Monday during the season at 7:00 pm from Cabarrus Brewing Company.

== Preseason media poll ==
Conference USA released their preseason media poll on July 16, 2019, with the 49ers predicted to finish in last place in the East Division.

East Division
| Predicted finish | Team |
| 1 | Marshall |
| 2 | FIU |
| 3 | Florida Atlantic |
| 4 | Middle Tennessee |
| 5 | Western Kentucky |
| 6 | Old Dominion |
| 7 | Charlotte |

== Game summaries ==
=== Gardner–Webb Runnin' Bulldogs ===
Gardner–Webb vs Charlotte

| Team | 1 | 2 | 3 | 4 | Total |
|---|---|---|---|---|---|
| Runnin' Bulldogs | 0 | 14 | 7 | 7 | 28 |
| • 49ers | 7 | 28 | 7 | 7 | 49 |

- Date: August 29
- Location: Jerry Richardson Stadium
  Charlotte, NC
- Game start: 7:30 pm EDT
- Elapsed time: 3:12
- Game attendance: 16,119
- Game weather: 82°F, Clear, 3 mph N
- Referee: Patrick Foy
- TV announcers (ESPN+): Bobby Rosinski, Reggie Walker, Libby Clark

Scoring summary
| 1 | 1:22 | CHAR | Benny LEMAY 1 Yd Run (Jonathan CRUZ Kick) | CHAR 7-0 |
| 2 | 8:59 | CHAR | Chris REYNOLDS 3 Yd Run (Jonathan CRUZ Kick) | CHAR 14-0 |
| 2 | 8:45 | GWU | Devron HARPER 99 Yd Kickoff Return (Josh WALSTON Kick) | CHAR 14-7 |
| 2 | 6:00 | CHAR | Aaron MCALLISTER 3 Yd pass from Chris REYNOLDS (Jonathan CRUZ Kick) | CHAR 21-7 |
| 2 | 3:44 | CHAR | Solomon ROGERS 16 Yd Return of Blocked Punt (Jonathan CRUZ Kick) | CHAR 28-7 |
| 2 | 0:50 | GWU | Jayln CAGLE 5 Yd Run (Josh WALSTON Kick) | CHAR 28-14 |
| 2 | 0:40 | CHAR | Benny LEMAY 65 Yd Run (Jonathan CRUZ Kick) | CHAR 35-14 |
| 3 | 6:30 | GWU | Jayln CAGLE 3 Yd Run (Austin MCKAY Kick) | CHAR 35-21 |
| 3 | 4:26 | CHAR | Chris REYNOLDS 1 Yd Run (Jonathan CRUZ Kick) | CHAR 42-21 |
| 4 | 14:15 | CHAR | Micaleous ELDER 31 Yd pass from Brett KEAN (Jonathan CRUZ Kick) | CHAR 49-21 |
| 4 | 4:19 | GWU | Dexter BROWN 35 Yd Run (Josh WALSTON Kick) | CHAR 49-28 |

Healy made his debut as head coach of the 49ers on August 29 against another former Austin Peay head coach in Gardner–Webb's Carroll McCray. The 49ers recorded a 49–28 victory in Will Healy's first game as their head coach.

Top performers included Charlotte quarterback Chris Reynolds who passed for 136 yards, a touchdown, and an interception. Charlotte's Benny LeMay had 16 carries for 120 yards and 2 touchdowns. Charlotte's Cameron Dollar had 5 receptions for 58 yards.

Game notes:

- This game marked the highest scoring total in Charlotte's FBS era.
- Ben DeLuca's 3rd quarter fumble recovery moved him into the all-time lead for the 49ers with six fumble recoveries.
- Alex Highsmith's two sacks moved him into second place on the 49ers sack list with eight career sacks behind Larry Ogunjobi's thirteen career sacks.
- 5 team sacks tied the program's single-game record.

=== Appalachian State Mountaineers ===
Charlotte vs Appalachian State

| Team | 1 | 2 | 3 | 4 | Total |
|---|---|---|---|---|---|
| 49ers | 6 | 7 | 15 | 13 | 41 |
| • Mountaineers | 14 | 14 | 14 | 14 | 56 |

- Date: September 7
- Location: Kidd Brewer Stadium
  Boone, NC
- Game start: 3:30 pm EDT
- Elapsed time: 3:50
- Game attendance: 29,182
- Game weather: 73°F, Partly Cloudy, 3 mph NW
- Referee: Jeremy Parker
- TV announcers (ESPN+): Harrison Battle, Pierre Banks

Scoring summary
| 1 | 14:43 | APP | Darrynton Evans 87 Yd Run (Chandler STATON Kick) | APP 7-0 |
| 1 | 7:50 | CHAR | Benny LEMAY 3 Yd Run (Jonathan CRUZ PAT failed) | APP 7-6 |
| 1 | 2:46 | APP | Thomas HENNIGAN 5 Yd pass from Zac THOMAS (Chandler STATON Kick) | APP 14-6 |
| 2 | 13:16 | CHAR | Benny LEMAY 58 Yd Run (Jonathan CRUZ Kick) | APP 14-13 |
| 2 | 1:14 | APP | Jalen VIRGIL 10 Yd pass from Zac THOMAS (Chandler STATON Kick) | APP 21-13 |
| 2 | 0:39 | APP | D'Marco JACKSON 16 Yd Return of Blocked Punt (Chandler STATON Kick) | APP 28-13 |
| 3 | 12:10 | CHAR | Cameron DOLLAR 24 Yd pass from Chris REYNOLDS (Jonathan CRUZ Kick) | APP 28-20 |
| 3 | 8:05 | APP | Darrynton EVANS 3 Yd Run (Chandler STATON Kick) | APP 35-20 |
| 3 | 3:00 | APP | Jalen VIRGIL 73 Yd pass from Zac THOMAS (Chandler STATON Kick) | APP 42-20 |
| 3 | 1:00 | CHAR | Benny LEMAY 5 Yd pass from Chris REYNOLDS (Chris REYNOLDS Pass to Victor TUCKER for Two-Point Conversion) | APP 42-28 |
| 4 | 8:20 | CHAR | Victor TUCKER 23 Yd pass from Chris REYNOLDS (Two-Point Pass Conversion Failed) | APP 42-34 |
| 4 | 7:14 | APP | Darrynton EVANS 68 Yd Run (Chandler STATON Kick) | APP 49-34 |
| 4 | 3:17 | CHAR | Victor TUCKER 27 Yd pass from Chris REYNOLDS (Jonathan CRUZ Kick) | APP 49-41 |
| 4 | 3:10 | APP | Darrynton EVANS 45 Yd Kickoff Return (Chandler STATON Kick) | APP 56-41 |

This was the 49ers' first visit to Boone, NC. After not scoring a touchdown in the previous matchup between these squads the 49ers would manage to keep the game within a two-score margin for the entire high-scoring contest. Charlotte would manage to control the clock and have the overall yardage lead but could never crack Appalachian States' score lead throughout the game

Top performers included Charlotte quarterback Chris Reynolds who passed for 296 yards, 4 touchdowns, and an interception. App. St.'s Darrynton Evans had 19 carries for 234 yards and 3 touchdowns. Appalachian's Jalen Virgil had 3 receptions for 86 yards and 2 touchdowns.

Game notes:

- Charlotte put up over 500 yards (526) of total offense for the second time in the season.
- Chris Reynolds would set both a new school FBS single-game passing yardage (296 yards) and touchdown (4) record in this game.
- First time Charlotte has scored 6 touchdowns against an FBS opponent on the road.
- First time Charlotte has scored 4 passing touchdowns against an FBS opponent.
- Charlotte is the first opponent to score more than 19 points in a game against App. St. in Boone since 2017.
- Charlotte's 41 points are the most points scored against App. St. in Boone since Miami beat them at home 45–10 in 2016.

=== Massachusetts Minutemen ===
UMass vs Charlotte

| Team | 1 | 2 | 3 | 4 | Total |
|---|---|---|---|---|---|
| Minutemen | 0 | 10 | 0 | 7 | 17 |
| • 49ers | 21 | 10 | 14 | 7 | 52 |

- Date: September 14
- Location: Jerry Richardson Stadium
  Charlotte, NC
- Game start: 6:00 pm EDT
- Elapsed time: 3:00
- Game attendance: 12,812
- Game weather: 84°F, Mostly Cloudy, 3 mph N
- TV announcers (ESPN3): Bobby Rosinski, Reggie Walker, Libby Clark

Scoring summary
| 1 | 13:22 | CHAR | Cameron DOLLAR 46 Yd pass from Chris REYNOLDS (Jonathan CRUZ Kick) | CHAR 7-0 |
| 1 | 4:25 | CHAR | Ishod FINGER 1 Yd Run (Jonathan CRUZ Kick) | CHAR 14-0 |
| 1 | 4:11 | CHAR | Henry SEGURA 49 Yd Interception Return (Jonathan CRUZ Kick) | CHAR 21-7 |
| 2 | 13:57 | CHAR | Tyler RINGWOOD 5 Yd pass from Chris REYNOLDS (Jonathan CRUZ Kick) | CHAR 28-0 |
| 2 | 10:36 | MASS | Cooper GARCIA 26 Yd Field Goal | CHAR 28-3 |
| 2 | 0:17 | MASS | Jermaine JOHNSON Jr. 3 Yd pass from Andrew BRITO (Cooper GARCIA Kick) | CHAR 28-10 |
| 2 | 0:00 | CHAR | Jonathan CRUZ 53 Yd Field Goal | CHAR 31-10 |
| 3 | 10:14 | CHAR | Ishod FINGER 3 Yd Run (Jonathan CRUZ Kick) | CHAR 38-10 |
| 3 | 1:18 | CHAR | Tyler RINGWOOD 41 Yd pass from Brett KEAN (Jonathan CRUZ Kick) | CHAR 45-10 |
| 4 | 12:26 | MASS | Isaiah RODGERS 42 Yd Punt Return (Cooper GARCIA Kick) | CHAR 45-17 |
| 4 | 12:07 | CHAR | Aaron MCALLISTER 69 Yd Run (Jonathan CRUZ Kick) | CHAR 52-17 |

Charlotte gained some revenge for last year's first quarter four touchdown lapse when they scored three touchdowns unanswered in the first quarter and a fourth early in the second. Charlotte would dominate the rest of the game in similar fashion to gain the program's first home out of conference FBS victory, and only the second FBS out of conference win.

Top performances were dominated by Charlotte and included quarterback Chris Reynolds who passed for 155 yards and 2 touchdowns. Running back Benny LeMay had 16 carries for 113 yards. Receiver Tyler Ringwood had 2 receptions for 46 yards and 2 touchdowns.

Game notes:

- 52 points are the most the 49ers have scored against an FBS opponent.
- This is the first time the 49ers have scored more than 40 points in 3 consecutive games.
- 35 points is Charlotte's largest margin of victory in an FBS game to date.
- 5 team sacks matched the program record for sacks in a game for the 2nd time this season.

=== #1 Clemson Tigers ===
Charlotte vs Clemson

| Team | 1 | 2 | 3 | 4 | Total |
|---|---|---|---|---|---|
| 49ers | 0 | 3 | 7 | 0 | 10 |
| • Tigers | 17 | 21 | 7 | 7 | 52 |

- Date: September 21
- Location: Clemson Memorial Stadium
  Clemson, SC
- Game start: 7:30 pm EDT
- Elapsed time: 3:03
- Game attendance: 81,500
- Game weather: 84°F, Clear, 3 mph S
- Referee: Jeff Macongghy
- TV announcers (ACCN): Dave O'Brien, Tim Hasselbeck, Katie George

Scoring summary
| 1 | 13:35 | CLEM | Tee Higgins 58 Yd pass from Trevor Lawrence (B.T. POTTER Kick) | CLEM 7-0 |
| 1 | 10:24 | CLEM | K'Von WALLACE 66 Yd Interception Return (B.T. POTTER Kick) | CLEM 14-0 |
| 1 | 5:03 | CLEM | B.T. POTTER 22 Yd Field Goal | CLEM 17-0 |
| 2 | 14:56 | CLEM | Cornell POWELL 2 Yd pass from Trevor LAWRENCE (B.T. POTTER Kick) | CLEM 24-0 |
| 2 | 8:31 | CLEM | Travis Etienne 2 Yd Run (B.T. POTTER Kick) | CLEM 31-0 |
| 2 | 4:27 | CHAR | Jonathan CRUZ 24 Yd Field Goal | CLEM 31-3 |
| 2 | 1:24 | CLEM | Lyn-J DIXON 1 Yd Run (B.T. POTTER Kick) | CLEM 38-3 |
| 3 | 9:51 | CLEM | Joe NGATA 37 Yd pass from Chase Brice (Steven SAWICKI Kick) | CLEM 45-3 |
| 3 | 4:53 | CHAR | Chris REYNOLDS 8 Yd Run (Jonathan CRUZ Kick) | CLEM 45-10 |
| 4 | 6:12 | CLEM | Michel DUKES 24 Yd Run (Steven SAWICKI Kick) | CLEM 52-10 |

Charlotte visited "Death Valley" for the first time to meet the defending National Champions. The Tigers went up early and never looked back, cruising to a 52 to 10 home victory.

Top performances were dominated by Clemson and included quarterback Trevor Lawrence who passed for 94 yards and 2 touchdowns. Running back Travis Etienne had 11 carries for 61 yards and a touchdown. Receiver Joe Ngata had 3 receptions for 62 yards and a touchdown.

Game notes:

- First time Charlotte has faced a defending national champion.
- First time Charlotte has faced a #1 ranked opponent.
- Alex Highsmith's sack in this game (5th on the season) has tied the previous season sack record held by Larry Ogunjobi.
- Highsmith is 2 sacks (11 career) away from tying Ogunjobi's career sacks at 13.
- Aaron McAllister became the 5th 49er to rush for over 1000 yards in his career.
- Game scenes for the upcoming Disney movie "Safety" were filmed during halftime.

=== Florida Atlantic Owls ===
Florida Atlantic vs Charlotte

| Team | 1 | 2 | 3 | 4 | Total |
|---|---|---|---|---|---|
| • Owls | 14 | 10 | 14 | 7 | 45 |
| 49ers | 7 | 7 | 7 | 6 | 27 |

- Date: September 28
- Location: Jerry Richardson Stadium
  Charlotte, NC
- Game start: 3:30 pm EDT
- Elapsed time: 3:27
- Game attendance: 12,334
- Game weather: 91°F, Clear, 1 mph N
- Referee: Joe Lehring
- TV announcers (NFLN): Dan Hellie, Max Starks, Molly Sullivan

Scoring summary
| 1 | 13:01 | FAU | Larry MCCAMMON III 3 Yd Run (Vladimir RIVAS PAT failed) | FAU 6-0 |
| 1 | 6:10 | FAU | Malcolm DAVIDSON 3 Yd Run (Chris ROBISON Pass to John MITCHELL for Two-Point Conversion) | FAU 14-0 |
| 1 | 3:29 | CHAR | Victor TUCKER 24 Yd pass from Chris REYNOLDS (Jonathan CRUZ Kick) | FAU 14-7 |
| 2 | 13:26 | FAU | Vladimir RIVAS 31 Yd Field Goal | FAU 17-7 |
| 2 | 3:26 | CHAR | Jacob HUNT 1 Yd pass from Chris REYNOLDS (Jonathan CRUZ Kick) | FAU 17-14 |
| 2 | 0:25 | FAU | Tavaris HARRISON 18 Yd pass from Chris ROBISON (Vladimir RIVAS Kick) | FAU 24-14 |
| 3 | 8:39 | CHAR | Aaron MCALLISTER 16 Yd pass from Chris REYNOLDS (Jonathan CRUZ Kick) | FAU 24-21 |
| 3 | 6:25 | FAU | Malcolm DAVIDSON 4 Yd Run (Vladimir RIVAS Kick) | FAU 31-21 |
| 3 | 2:12 | FAU | John RAINE 2 Yd pass from Chris ROBISON (Vladimir RIVAS Kick) | FAU 38-21 |
| 4 | 7:34 | FAU | James CHARLES 1 Yd Run (Vladimir RIVAS Kick) | FAU 45-21 |
| 4 | 0:13 | CHAR | Ishod FINGER 5 Yd Run (Jonathan CRUZ PAT failed) | FAU 45-27 |

Charlotte and Florida Atlantic both opened conference play in a rematch of the previous season finale. Florida Atlantic would get revenge for losing a chance at a bowl game the previous season by holding off two Niners rally attempts and stretching the lead out in the second half to comfortably win the game.

Top performers included FAU quarterback Chris Robison who passed for 312 yards, 2 touchdowns, and an interception. Florida Atlantic's Malcolm Davidson had 13 carries for 83 yards and 2 touchdowns. Charlotte's Victor Tucker had 6 receptions for 115 yards and a touchdown.

Game notes:

- Chris Reynolds's tied Haasan Klugh's single Conference USA game passing touchdowns record at 3.
- Alex Highsmith's sack in this game (6th on the season) broke the previous single-season sack record held by Larry Ogunjobi.
- Highsmith is 1 sack (12 career) away from tying Ogunjobi's career sacks record at 13.

=== FIU Panthers ===
Charlotte vs FIU

| Team | 1 | 2 | 3 | 4 | Total |
|---|---|---|---|---|---|
| 49ers | 10 | 7 | 6 | 0 | 23 |
| • Panthers | 7 | 21 | 13 | 7 | 48 |

- Date: October 12
- Location: Riccardo Silva Stadium
  Miami, FL
- Game start: 7:05 pm EDT
- Elapsed time: 3:05
- Game attendance: 16,834
- Game weather: 81°F, Cloudy, 13 mph ENE
- Referee: Billy Williams
- TV announcers (ESPN+): A. J. Ricketts, Kenny Kelly

Scoring summary
| 1 | 10:56 | CHAR | Jonathan CRUZ 31 Yd Field Goal | CHAR 3-0 |
| 1 | 4:03 | FIU | Shemar THORNTON 6 Yd pass from James MORGAN (José Borregales Kick) | FIU 7-3 |
| 1 | 1:10 | CHAR | Aaron MCALLISTER 8 Yd Run (Jonathan CRUZ Kick) | CHAR 10-7 |
| 2 | 13:29 | FIU | Kaylan WIGGINS 4 Yd Run (José BORREGALES Kick) | FIU 14-10 |
| 2 | 8:18 | FIU | Napoleon MAXWELL 13 Yd Run (José BORREGALES Kick) | FIU 21-10 |
| 2 | 2:56 | CHAR | Benny LEMAY 43 Yd pass from Chris REYNOLDS (Jonathan CRUZ Kick) | FIU 21-17 |
| 2 | 0:25 | FIU | Anthony JONES 5 Yd pass from James MORGAN (José BORREGALES Kick) | FIU 28-17 |
| 3 | 11:34 | FIU | Anthony JONES 5 Yd Run (José BORREGALES PAT failed) | FIU 34-17 |
| 3 | 5:21 | CHAR | Benny LEMAY 12 Yd Run (Jonathan CRUZ PAT failed) | FIU 34-23 |
| 3 | 3:07 | FIU | Anthony JONES 41 Yd Run (José BORREGALES Kick) | FIU 41-23 |
| 4 | 9:58 | FIU | Anthony JONES 13 Yd Run (José BORREGALES Kick) | FIU 48-23 |

Charlotte would lose control of the game early in the second quarter. Florida International broke the game open with 21 points to finish the half and followed up in the third quarter with two more touchdowns to put the game well out of the 49ers' reach.

Top performers included FIU quarterback James Morgan who passed for 160 yards and 2 touchdowns. The Panthers' Anthony Jones had 16 carries for 117 yards and 3 touchdowns. Charlotte's Benny LeMay had 4 receptions for 90 yards and a touchdown to add to his rushing stats of 21 carries for 144 yards and an additional touchdown.

Game notes:

- Benny LeMay put up a career high 234 yards from scrimmage.
- LeMay had his 4th 100 yard rushing game of the season.

=== WKU Hilltoppers ===
Charlotte vs WKU

| Team | 1 | 2 | 3 | 4 | Total |
|---|---|---|---|---|---|
| 49ers | 7 | 7 | 0 | 0 | 14 |
| • Hilltoppers | 7 | 10 | 13 | 0 | 30 |

- Date: October 19
- Location: Houchens Industries–L. T. Smith Stadium
  Bowling Green, KT
- Game start: 3:05 pm CDT
- Elapsed time: 2:58
- Game attendance: 15,816
- Game weather: 66°F, Cloudy, 7 mph S
- Referee: Joe Lehring
- TV announcers (ESPN+): Graham Doty, Brandon Doughty

Scoring summary
| 1 | 7:12 | CHAR | Ishod FINGER 4 Yd Run (Jonathan CRUZ Kick) | CHAR 7-0 |
| 1 | 0:52 | WKU | Jahcour PEARSON 30 Yd pass from Ty STOREY (Cory MUNSON Kick) | TIED 7-7 |
| 2 | 12:45 | WKU | Lucky JACKSON 69 Yd pass from Ty STOREY (Cory MUNSON Kick) | WKU 14-7 |
| 2 | 9:00 | CHAR | Benny LEMAY 47 Yd pass from Chris REYNOLDS (Jonathan CRUZ Kick) | TIED 14-14 |
| 2 | 4:08 | WKU | Cory MUNSON 45 Yd Field Goal | WKU 17-14 |
| 3 | 10:45 | WKU | Cory MUNSON 32 Yd Field Goal | WKU 20-14 |
| 3 | 5:41 | WKU | Cory MUNSON 48 Yd Field Goal | WKU 23-14 |
| 3 | 0:08 | WKU | Ty STOREY 8 Yd pass from Lucky JACKSON (Cory MUNSON Kick) | WKU 30-4 |

The Hilltoppers would be Charlotte's third homecoming game in a row and their fourth straight loss. Though the game was competitive in the first half Charlotte couldn't find the endzones or the uprights in the second half.

Top performances were dominated by the Hilltoppers. Quarterback Ty Storey threw for 283 yards and two touchdowns. Rusher Geaj Walker had 21 carries for 70 yards. Receiver Lucky Jackson had five receptions for 141 yards and a touchdown.

Game notes:

- Alex Highsmith's two sacks in this game moved him into first place in career sacks (13.5 career). Breaking Larry Ogunjobi's previous career sacks record.
- Highsmith now owns all the program sack records for the 49ers. Single game (2), single season (7.5) and career (13.5).
- Victor Tucker became the 6th player in program history to reach 1,000 yards receiving.

=== North Texas Mean Green ===
North Texas vs Charlotte

| Team | 1 | 2 | 3 | 4 | Total |
|---|---|---|---|---|---|
| Mean Green | 14 | 7 | 14 | 3 | 38 |
| • 49ers | 0 | 7 | 14 | 18 | 39 |

- Date: October 26
- Location: Jerry Richardson Stadium
  Charlotte, NC
- Game start: 3:35 pm EDT
- Elapsed time: 3:30
- Game attendance: 8,245
- Game weather: 76°F, Overcast, 3 mph SE
- Referee: Justin Elliott
- TV announcers (ESPN+): Bobby Rosinski, Reggie Walker, Libby Clark

Scoring summary
| 1 | 4:48 | UNT | Jaelon Darden 64 Yd pass from Mason FINE (Ethan MOONEY Kick) | UNT 7-0 |
| 1 | 1:03 | UNT | Jyaire SHORTER 40 Yd pass from Mason FINE (Ethan MOONEY Kick) | UNT 14-0 |
| 2 | 10:13 | CHAR | Benny LEMAY 1 Yd Run (Jonathan CRUZ Kick) | UNT 14-7 |
| 2 | 0:15 | UNT | Jyaire SHORTER 57 Yd pass from Mason FINE (Ethan MOONEY Kick) | UNT 21-7 |
| 3 | 8:47 | CHAR | Tyler RINGWOOD 52 Yd pass from Chris REYNOLDS (Jonathan CRUZ Kick) | UNT 21-14 |
| 3 | 6:07 | UNT | Jyaire SHORTER 14 Yd pass from Mason FINE (Ethan MOONEY Kick) | UNT 28-14 |
| 3 | 3:12 | CHAR | Chris REYNOLDS 29 Yd Run (Jonathan CRUZ Kick) | UNT 28-21 |
| 3 | 0:31 | UNT | Michael LAWRENCE 34 Yd pass from Mason FINE (Ethan MOONEY Kick) | UNT 35-21 |
| 4 | 11:41 | CHAR | Benny LEMAY 31 Yd pass from Chris REYNOLDS (Two-Point Pass Conversion Failed) | UNT 35-27 |
| 4 | 3:34 | CHAR | Benny LEMAY 5 Yd Run (Two-Point Run Conversion Failed) | UNT 35-33 |
| 4 | 1:12 | UNT | Ethan MOONEY 51 Yd Field Goal | UNT 38-33 |
| 4 | 0:18 | CHAR | Victor TUCKER 34 Yd pass from Chris REYNOLDS (Two-Point Run Conversion Failed) | CHAR 39-38 |

In this first ever meeting of conference foes the Mean Green took an early lead and held it throughout the game; but an offensive flurry for the 49ers in the fourth quarter, combined with the defense shutting down North Texas's high power offense in the same time period, resulted in the Niners gaining their first conference victory of the year.

Top performers of the game included North Texas's Mason Fine, who threw for 394 yards and 5 touchdowns. Charlotte's Benny LeMay rushed for 155 yards on 30 carries for 2 touchdowns. The Mean Green's Jyaire Shorter had 3 receptions for 111 yards and 3 touchdowns.

Game notes:

- First game between these conference foes from opposite divisions.
- Will Healy's first C-USA victory.
- Charlotte set a new program record for total offense against an FBS opponent with 589 yards.
- Chris Reynolds's 432 total yards of offense (336 passing, 96 rushing) broke the single game record for total yardage previously set by Matt Johnson (415 vs Gardner-Webb in 2013).
- Reynolds was named C-USA Offensive Player of the Week.

=== Middle Tennessee Blue Raiders ===
Middle Tennessee vs Charlotte

| Team | 1 | 2 | 3 | 4 | Total |
|---|---|---|---|---|---|
| Blue Raiders | 7 | 0 | 6 | 7 | 20 |
| • 49ers | 14 | 10 | 10 | 0 | 34 |

- Date: November 2
- Location: Jerry Richardson Stadium
  Charlotte, NC
- Game start: 3:35 pm EST
- Elapsed time: 2:55
- Game attendance: 13,879
- Game weather: 60°F, Clear, 3 mph N
- Referee: Chris Bynum
- TV announcers (ESPN3): Bobby Rosinski, Reggie Walker, Libby Clark

Scoring summary
| 1 | 11:27 | MTSU | Zack DOBSON 19 Yd pass from Asher O'HARA (Crews HOLT Kick) | MTSU 7-0 |
| 1 | 8:54 | CHAR | Aaron MCALLISTER 2 Yd Run (Jonathan CRUZ Kick) | TIED 7-7 |
| 1 | 5:34 | CHAR | Chris REYNOLDS 19 Yd Run (Jonathan CRUZ Kick) | CHAR 14-7 |
| 2 | 13:56 | CHAR | Aaron MCALLISTER 5 Yd Run (Jonathan CRUZ Kick) | CHAR 21-7 |
| 2 | 0:00 | CHAR | Jonathan CRUZ 38 Yd Field Goal | CHAR 24-7 |
| 3 | 8:35 | CHAR | Christian ROBERSON 1 Yd pass from Chris REYNOLDS (Jonathan CRUZ Kick) | CHAR 31-7 |
| 3 | 2:05 | CHAR | Jonathan CRUZ 49 Yd Field Goal | CHAR 34-7 |
| 3 | 0:12 | MTSU | Asher O'HARA 7 Yd Run (Two-Point Pass Conversion Failed) | CHAR 34-13 |
| 4 | 8:46 | MTSU | Jimmy MARSHALL 10 Yd pass from Asher O'HARA (Crews HOLT Kick) | CHAR 34-20 |

Middle Tennessee would get the first points, but Charlotte's defense wouldn't let them score again until the fourth quarter. By then it was too late, as the 49ers had a steady stream of scores in the first quarter and stretched the lead out enough to make the late Blue Raiders' rally fall far short.

Charlotte dominated the top performances with Chris Reynolds throwing for 192 yards and a touchdown while also adding a rushing touchdown behind 103 yards on the ground. Charlotte's Aaron McAllister would step in for the injured Benny LeMay with 24 carriers for 104 yards and 2 touchdowns. Charlotte's Cameron Dollar had 3 receptions for 80 yards.

Game notes:

- Charlotte's first win in five tries against this C-USA East Division foe in the series. Charlotte has now defeated all C-USA East Division teams at least once save for Florida International.
- First time Charlotte has won back-to-back FBS and conference home games.
- Senior linebacker Jeff Gemmell would record 7 tackles in the game, making him the 49ers' all-time leading tackler with 269 tackles so far on his career, beating out the previous record of 267 tackles held by Karrington King.

=== UTEP Miners ===
Charlotte vs UTEP

| Team | 1 | 2 | 3 | 4 | Total |
|---|---|---|---|---|---|
| • 49ers | 0 | 7 | 14 | 7 | 28 |
| Miners | 14 | 7 | 0 | 0 | 21 |

- Date: November 9
- Location: Sun Bowl Stadium
  El Paso, TX
- Game start: 1:00 pm MST
- Elapsed time: 3:15
- Game attendance: 15,683
- Game weather: 70°F, Mostly Sunny, 0 mph
- Referee: Billy Williams
- TV announcers (ESPN+): Andy Morgan, Trevor Vitteto

Scoring summary
| 1 | 9:21 | UTEP | Kai LOCKSLEY 19 Yd Run (Gavin BAECHLE Kick) | UTEP 7-0 |
| 1 | 1:52 | UTEP | Justin GARRETT 15 Yd pass from Kai LOCKSLEY (Gavin BAECHLE Kick) | UTEP 14-0 |
| 2 | 10:57 | CHAR | Tyler RINGWOOD 16 Yd pass from Chris REYNOLDS (Jonathan CRUZ Kick) | UTEP 14-7 |
| 2 | 0:42 | UTEP | Treyvon HUGHES 3 Yd Run (Gavin BAECHLE Kick) | UTEP 21-7 |
| 3 | 11:50 | CHAR | Jonathan CRUZ 45 Yd Field Goal | UTEP 21-10 |
| 3 | 4:48 | CHAR | Ishod FINGER 3 Yd Run (Chris REYNOLDS Pass to Christian ROBERSON for Two-Point Conversion) | UTEP 21-18 |
| 3 | 0:44 | CHAR | Jonathan CRUZ 34 Yd Field Goal | TIED 21-21 |
| 4 | 7:06 | CHAR | Jacob HUNT 19 Yd pass from Chris REYNOLDS (Jonathan CRUZ Kick) | CHAR 28-21 |

The Miners, looking for their first FBS and conference win of the season, would strike quickly by going up two touchdowns in the first quarter and taking a two score lead into the half. The 49ers would reverse the action in the second half, holding the Miners scoreless while coming from behind to take their first road victory of the year.

Chris Reynolds would have another outstanding performance, setting a new FBS school single game record with 354 passing yards which resulted in 2 touchdowns and an interception. With Benny LeMay still injured Reynolds would also add 18 carries for 91 yards on the ground to be the 49ers' top rusher. The Miners' QB Kai Locksley would be their top rusher today as well, having 15 carries for 84 yards and a touchdown. Charlotte's Cameron Dollar would grab 9 receptions for 157 yards.

Game Notes:

- First game between these conference foes from opposite divisions.
- First Charlotte 49ers game in the Mountain Time Zone.
- First time Charlotte has won 3 FBS and conference games in a row.
- First road victory for the program on the season.
- Chris Reynolds set a new school single game FBS passing record of 354 yards, only 4 yards shy of the all-time single game passing yards record held by Matt Johnson.
- Reynolds' 354 passing yards and 91 rushing yards would set a new single game total offensive yardage record of 445 total yards, setting a new mark over his own previously set record of 432 total yards set two weeks earlier against North Texas.
- Reynolds also crossed the 2000 yards mark for the season and 3000 yards mark on his career.

=== Marshall Thundering Herd ===
Marshall vs Charlotte

| Team | 1 | 2 | 3 | 4 | Total |
|---|---|---|---|---|---|
| Thundering Herd | 7 | 3 | 3 | 0 | 13 |
| • 49ers | 0 | 7 | 3 | 14 | 24 |

- Date: November 23
- Location: Jerry Richardson Stadium
  Charlotte, NC
- Game start: 3:30 pm EST
- Elapsed time: 3:18
- Game attendance: 10,526
- Game weather: 51°F, Rainy, 2 mph N
- Referee: Chris Bynum
- TV announcers (Stadium, Facebook Live): Chris Hassel, A. J. Hawk, Kristen Balboni

Scoring summary
| 1 | 3:02 | MARSH | Joseph EARLY 16 Yd Punt Return (Justin ROHRWASSER Kick) | MARSH 7-0 |
| 2 | 11:11 | MARSH | Justin ROHRWASSER 31 Yd Field Goal | MARSH 10-0 |
| 2 | 4:25 | CHAR | Chris REYNOLDS 15 Yd Run (Jonathan CRUZ Kick) | MARSH 10-7 |
| 3 | 9:25 | CHAR | Jonathan CRUZ 23 Yd Field Goal | TIED 10-10 |
| 3 | 4:02 | MARSH | Justin ROHRWASSER 31 Yd Field Goal | MARSH 13-10 |
| 4 | 10:47 | CHAR | Victor TUCKER 5 Yd Run (Jonathan CRUZ Kick) | CHAR 17-13 |
| 4 | 0:48 | CHAR | Victor TUCKER 25 Yd pass from Chris REYNOLDS (Jonathan CRUZ Kick) | CHAR 24-13 |

In a heavy rain the Thundering Herd, looking to secure home field for the C-USA Championship, would take an early lead; but the 49ers' defense would keep Marshall's offense from reaching the end zone for the entire game. Behind Quarterback Chris Reynolds the 49ers would stage a second half comeback victory to secure the program's first winning season and first bowl game qualification.

The 49ers' Chris Reynolds would dominate the passing and rushing stats in the game, getting a touchdown by both methods. He passed for 166 yards, a touchdown, and 2 interceptions. He rushed for 145 yards on 25 carries and another touchdown. Charlotte's Victor Tucker would make 5 receptions for 121 yards and a touchdown, plus rush for another touchdown.

Game notes:

- The 49ers became bowl eligible for the first time.
- First time the program had 4 victories in a row.
- Tied the number of conference victories in a season at 4.
- Set a new school record for home wins at 5.
- Tied school record with 3rd straight home win.
- Chris Reynolds would move into 2nd place for program career passing yards with 3373 career yards.
- Benny LeMay, returning from injury, would record his 13th career game with 100 yards or more.
- LeMay would also become the 2nd 49er to rush for 3000 yards (3082 yards) in his career, only behind Kalif Phillips (4020 yards).
- Cam Clark would tie the consecutive games played mark with his 47th game.
- Victor Tucker was named Conference USA Offensive Player of the Week.

=== Old Dominion Monarchs (Khedive Shriners Oyster Bowl) ===
Charlotte vs Old Dominion

| Team | 1 | 2 | 3 | 4 | Total |
|---|---|---|---|---|---|
| • 49ers | 14 | 10 | 14 | 0 | 38 |
| Monarchs | 7 | 0 | 7 | 8 | 22 |

- Date: November 30
- Location: S.B. Ballard Stadium
  Norfolk, VA
- Game start: 2:00 pm EST
- Elapsed time: 3:21
- Game attendance: 16,369
- Game weather: 47°F, Cloudy, 4 mph NW
- Referee: Joe Lehring
- TV announcers (ESPN+): Ted Alexander, Andy Mashaw, Doug Ripley

Scoring summary
| 1 | 9:18 | CHAR | Victor TUCKER 58 Yd pass from Chris REYNOLDS (Jonathan CRUZ Kick) | CHAR 7-0 |
| 1 | 6:07 | ODU | Blake WATSON 9 Yd Run (Nick RICE Kick) | TIED 7-7 |
| 1 | 4:19 | CHAR | Benny LEMAY 16 Yd Run (Jonathan CRUZ Kick) | CHAR 14-7 |
| 2 | 13:00 | CHAR | Aaron MCALLISTER 9 Yd Run (Jonathan CRUZ Kick) | CHAR 21-7 |
| 2 | 7:37 | CHAR | Jonathan CRUZ 36 Yd Field Goal | CHAR 24-7 |
| 3 | 7:15 | ODU | Lala DAVIS 8 Yd Run (Nick RICE Kick) | CHAR 24-14 |
| 3 | 2:45 | CHAR | Tyler RINGWOOD 15 Yd pass from Chris REYNOLDS (Jonathan CRUZ Kick) | CHAR 31-14 |
| 3 | 1:29 | CHAR | Benny LEMAY 10 Yd Run (Jackson VANSICKLE Kick) | CHAR 38-14 |
| 4 | 3:29 | ODU | Kesean STRONG 22 Yd Run (Stone Smartt Pass to Darius SAVEDGE for Two-Point Conversion) | CHAR 38-22 |

Charlotte would come into Norfolk looking to secure their first winning season in program history and a spot in a bowl game. Charlotte would cruise to a relatively easy win over the struggling Monarchs and prepare for their first ever game past the month of November.

Charlotte dominated the top performances of the game with Chris Reynolds passing for 166 yards, two touchdowns and an interception. Benny LeMay would rush on 18 carries for 105 yards and two touchdowns. Victor Tucker had 3 receptions for 118 yards and a touchdown.

Game notes:

- Charlotte's first Oyster Bowl.
- First winning season in program history.
- First five game winning streak in program history.
- Set a new conference victory total with 5 wins.
- Benny LeMay secured his 2nd 1000 yard rushing season of his career.
- Chris Reynolds tied the season passing touchdown mark set by Matt Johnson at 21 touchdowns.
- Victor Tucker became the 49ers all-time leader in FBS reception yards.
- Alex Highsmith set 2 single game records with 4.5 sacks and 5 tackles for loss.
- Highsmith was named Oyster Bowl MVP.
- Highsmith was named C-USA Defensive Player of the Week.
- Jeff Gemmell, the 49ers' all-time leader in tackles, became the first 49er with 300 career tackles.
- Cam Clark became the first 49er to play in a record setting 48 games.

=== Buffalo Bulls (Makers Wanted Bahamas Bowl) ===
Buffalo vs Charlotte

| Team | 1 | 2 | 3 | 4 | Total |
|---|---|---|---|---|---|
| • Bulls | 7 | 10 | 7 | 7 | 31 |
| 49ers | 0 | 0 | 6 | 3 | 9 |

- Date: December 20
- Location: Thomas Robinson Stadium
  Nassau, Bahamas
- Game start: 2:00 pm EST
- Elapsed time: 3:14
- Game attendance: 13,547
- Game weather: 77°F, Mostly Cloudy, 26 mph ENE
- Referee: Wayne Winkler
- TV announcers (ESPN): Steve Levy, Greg McElroy, Dianna Russini

Scoring summary
| 1 | 9:12 | BUFF | Antonio NUNN 12 Yd pass from Kyle Vantrease (Alex MCNULTY Kick) | BUFF 7-0 |
| 2 | 3:33 | BUFF | Kyle VANTREASE 1 Yd Run (Alex MCNULTY Kick) | BUFF 14-0 |
| 2 | 1:25 | BUFF | Alex MCNULTY 31 Yd Field Goal | BUFF 17-0 |
| 3 | 5:22 | BUFF | Jaret Patterson 6 Yd Run (Alex MCNULTY Kick) | BUFF 24-0 |
| 3 | 2:20 | CHAR | Victor TUCKER 51 Yd pass from Chris REYNOLDS (Two-Point Pass Conversion Failed) | BUFF 24-6 |
| 4 | 10:50 | CHAR | Jonathan CRUZ 32 Yd Field Goal | BUFF 24-9 |
| 4 | 1:43 | BUFF | Jaret PATTERSON 10 Yd Run (Alex MCNULTY Kick) | BUFF 31-9 |

High winds encouraged both teams to keep things on the ground early but it was the Bulls that were able to score first and most often behind their powerful dual threat running game. The 49ers would have two costly drive stalling first half penalties and two costly turnovers at key moments of the game. The 49ers would finally score in the second half, but the game was out of reach as the Bulls took home their first bowl trophy in their fourth bowl appearance.

Top performers of the game included Charlotte quarterback Chris Reynolds, who threw for 198 yards with a touchdown and an interception. Buffalo rusher Jaret Patterson would have 32 carries for 173 yards and 2 touchdowns. Bulls' receiver Antonio Nunn had 5 receptions for 53 yards and a touchdown.

Game notes:

- First Bowl game in program history.
- First international game in program history.
- First time the team played a 13th game in a season.
- First December game in program history.
- Chris Reynolds touchdown pass to Victor Tucker was his 22nd of the season and broke the single season passing touchdown record held by Matt Johnson from the 2013 Inaugural Season.
- All-time 49ers' leading tackler Jeff Gemmell would finish his career with 306 tackles.
- Alex Highsmith finished his career with a school record 20 sacks.
- Cam Clark became the first 49er to play in his 49th game, and appropriately wore the #49 jersey in his final game.

== Attendance ==
| Season | Games | Sellouts | W–L (%) | Attendance | Average | Best |
| 2019 | 6 | 1 | 5-1 (.833) | 73,924 | 12,321 | 16,119 |

== Players drafted into the NFL ==
| Round | Pick | Player | Position | NFL club |
|---|---|---|---|---|
| 3 | 102 | Alex Highsmith | DE | Pittsburgh Steelers |
| 4 | 129 | Cameron Clark | OT | New York Jets |
