= List of Charlotte 49ers in the NFL draft =

This is a list of Charlotte 49ers football players in the NFL draft.

== Key ==
B	Back	K	Kicker	NT	Nose tackle
C	Center	LB	Linebacker	FB	Fullback
DB	Defensive back	P	Punter	HB	Halfback
DE	Defensive end	QB	Quarterback	WR	Wide receiver
DT	Defensive tackle	RB	Running back	G	Guard
E	End	T	Offensive tackle	TE	Tight end

== Selections ==
Year	Round	Pick	Player	Team	Position
2017	3	65	Larry Ogunjobi	Cleveland Browns	DT
2019	3	82	Nate Davis	Tennessee Titans	G
2020	3	102	Alex Highsmith	Pittsburgh Steelers	DE
2020	4	129	Cameron Clark	New York Jets	G
2023	7	256	Grant DuBose	Green Bay Packers	WR
