= Marcus West =

American football player and coach (born 1983)

Tampa Bay Buccaneers
- Title: Defensive line coach

Personal information
- Born: November 6, 1983 (age 43); Amory, Mississippi, U.S.
- Listed height: 6 ft 3 in (1.91 m)
- Listed weight: 280 lb (127 kg)

Career information
- Position: Defensive tackle (No. 60, 43, 97)
- High school: Columbus (MS)
- College: Memphis
- NFL draft: 2006: undrafted

Career history

Playing
- Indianapolis Colts (2006)*; Amsterdam Admirals (2007); Hamilton Tiger-Cats (2007)
- * Offseason or practice squad member only

Coaching
- Wartburg (2008) Defensive line coach; Chattanooga (2009–2015) Defensive line coach; Austin Peay (2016–2017) Assistant head coach, co-defensive coordinator & defensive line coach; Minnesota (2018) Defensive line pass rush specialist; Charlotte (2019–2021) Assistant head coach, co-defensive coordinator & defensive line coach; Buffalo Bills (2022–2023) Assistant defensive line coach; Buffalo Bills (2024–2025) Defensive line coach; Tampa Bay Buccaneers (2026–present) Defensive line coach

Career CFL statistics
- Games played: 5
- Total tackles: 5

Marcus West (born November 6, 1983) is an American football coach and former defensive tackle who is the defensive line coach for the Tampa Bay Buccaneers of the National Football League (NFL). Prior to being hired by the Buffalo Bills as the assistant defensive line coach, he was the co-defensive coordinator and defensive line coach at the University of North Carolina at Charlotte. He played for the Indianapolis Colts, Amsterdam Admirals, and Hamilton Tiger-Cats before getting into coaching. He was promoted to defensive line coach of the Bills ahead of the 2024 season, following Eric Washington’s departure to become the defensive coordinator of the Chicago Bears.

== Coaching career ==
West began his coaching career at Wartburg College as a defensive line coach before going on to Chattanooga as a defensive line coach. He joined the coaching staff of fellow Chattanooga assistant Will Healy at Austin Peay in 2016 as a co-defensive coordinator and defensive line coach.

=== Minnesota ===
West was added to the coaching staff at Minnesota in 2018 as a defensive line pass rush specialist.

=== Charlotte ===
West joined Healy's inaugural staff at Charlotte in 2019 as his assistant head coach and co-defensive coordinator.

=== Buffalo Bills ===
On February 24, 2022, the Buffalo Bills hired West as their assistant defensive line coach, replacing Jacques Cesaire, who left to become the defensive line coach for the Houston Texans. On February 2, 2024, he was promoted to defensive line coach.

=== Tampa Bay Buccaneers ===
On January 29, 2026, the Tampa Bay Buccaneers hired West to be their defensive line coach.

== Personal life ==
West is married to the former Nikki Blassingame, an assistant on the Chattanooga women's basketball staff who he met while coaching there. Nikki is currently an assistant coach at NC State after spending one season at Charlotte.
