= Alex Highsmith =

American football player (born 1997)

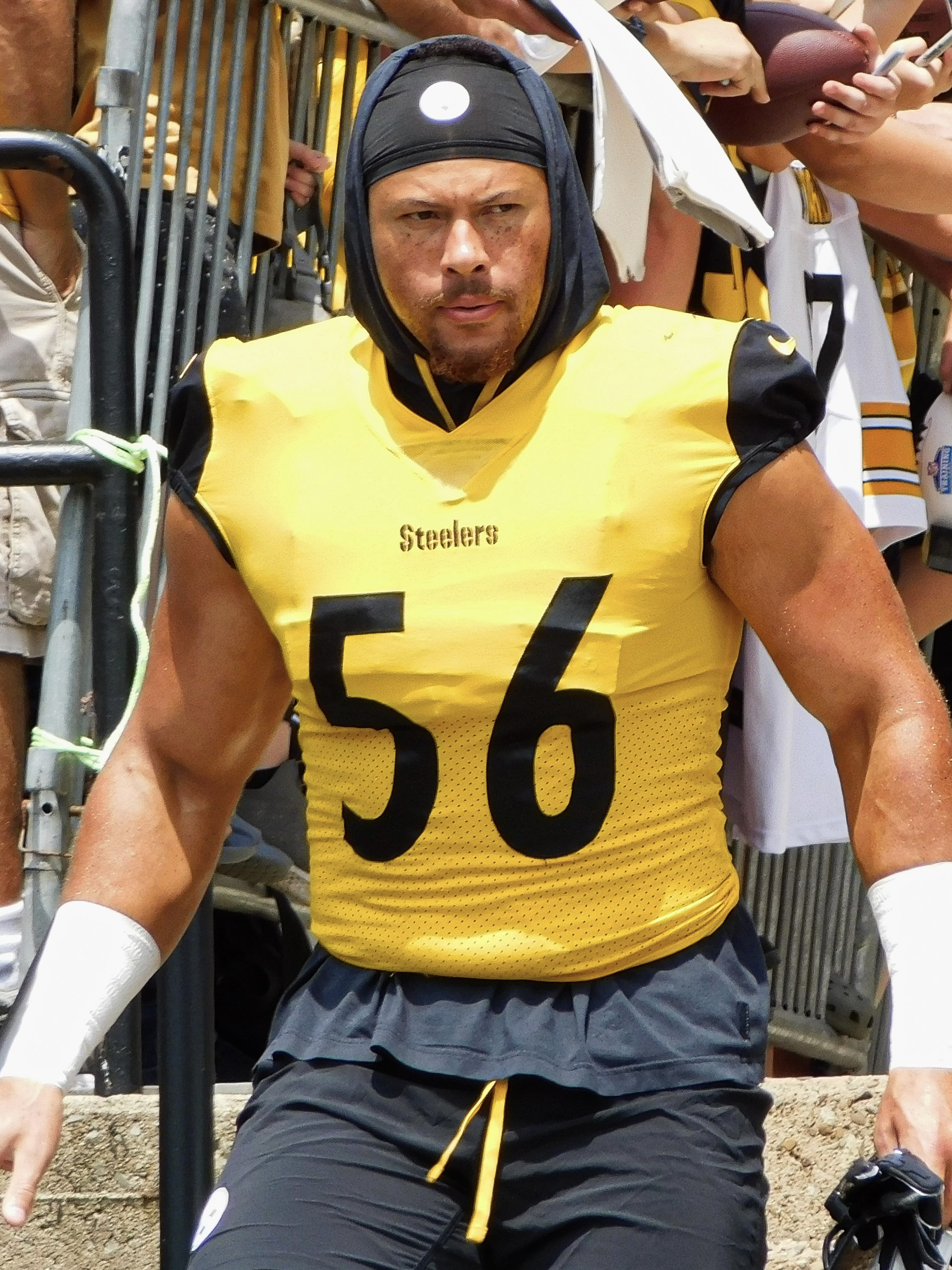
- Highsmith with the Pittsburgh Steelers in 2025

No. 56 – Pittsburgh Steelers
- Position: Outside linebacker
- Roster status: Active

Personal information
- Born: August 7, 1997 (age 29); Wilmington, North Carolina, U.S.
- Listed height: 6 ft 4 in (1.93 m)
- Listed weight: 242 lb (110 kg)

Career information
- High school: Eugene Ashley (Wilmington)
- College: Charlotte (2015–2019)
- NFL draft: 2020: 3rd round, 102nd overall pick

Career history
- Pittsburgh Steelers (2020–present)

Awards and highlights
- NFL forced fumbles co-leader (2022); Third-team All-American (2019); 2× First-team All-C-USA (2018, 2019)

Career NFL statistics as of Week 10, 2026
- Total tackles: 356
- Sacks: 48.5
- Forced fumbles: 10
- Pass deflections: 11
- Interceptions: 3
- Defensive touchdowns: 1
- Stats at Pro Football Reference

Alex Highsmith (born August 7, 1997) is an American professional football outside linebacker for the Pittsburgh Steelers of the National Football League (NFL). He played college football for the Charlotte 49ers.

== Early life ==
Highsmith grew up in Wilmington, North Carolina, and attended Eugene Ashley High School, where he played baseball, basketball and football. He played middle linebacker and fullback and was named second-team All-Area and first-team All-Mideastern Conference as a senior. He was also named All-Area in baseball. Highsmith was lightly recruited by college programs and only received interest from Davidson and Furman before being offered a spot on UNC Charlotte's team as a walk on.

== College career ==
Highsmith joined the Charlotte 49ers as a walk-on and redshirted his true freshman season in 2015. As a redshirt freshman, he played in all 12 of the 49ers games and finished the season with 17 tackles and a sack. Highsmith was a key member of Charlotte's defensive line rotation during his redshirt sophomore season and finished the year with 33 tackles with 5.0 tackles for loss, 2.0 sacks and one fumble recovery. He was named a starter at defensive end as a redshirt junior and was named first-team All-Conference USA after setting a school record with 17.5 tackles for loss along with 60 total tackles, three sacks and two forced fumbles. He was again named first-team All-Conference USA and was also a third-team All-American selection by the Associated Press as a redshirt senior, after setting new school records with 14 sacks and 21.5 tackles for loss.

=== College statistics ===
Year	Team	GP	Defense			
Year	Team	GP	Tackles	TFL	Sacks	FF
2016	Charlotte	12	17	2.0	1.0	0
2017	Charlotte	11	33	5.0	2.0	0
2018	Charlotte	12	60	18.5	3.0	2
2019	Charlotte	13	75	21.5	15.0	2
Career		45	185	47.0	21.0	4

== Professional career ==
Pre-draft measurables
Height	Weight	Arm length	Hand span	Wingspan	40-yard dash	10-yard split	20-yard split	20-yard shuttle	Three-cone drill	Vertical jump	Broad jump	Wonderlic
6 ft 3 1/8 in (1.91 m)	248 lb (112 kg)	33 1/8 in (0.84 m)	9 1/8 in (0.23 m)	6 ft 4 7/8 in (1.95 m)	4.70 s	1.68 s	2.75 s	4.31 s	7.32 s	33.0 in (0.84 m)	10 ft 5 in (3.18 m)	26
All values from NFL Combine

=== 2020 ===
Highsmith was selected by the Pittsburgh Steelers in the third round, 102nd overall, of the 2020 NFL draft.

In week 8 against the Baltimore Ravens, Highsmith recorded his first career interception off a pass thrown by Lamar Jackson during the 28–24 win. In week 9 against the Dallas Cowboys, Highsmith recorded his first career sack on Garrett Gilbert during the 24–19 win. In week 13 against the Washington Football Team, Highsmith made his starting debut. In it, he recorded five tackles in the Steelers first loss of the season. Highsmith finished the remaining four games as the Steelers' starter, recording 23 more tackles as well as one sack that he recorded during their season finale against the Cleveland Browns.

=== 2021 ===
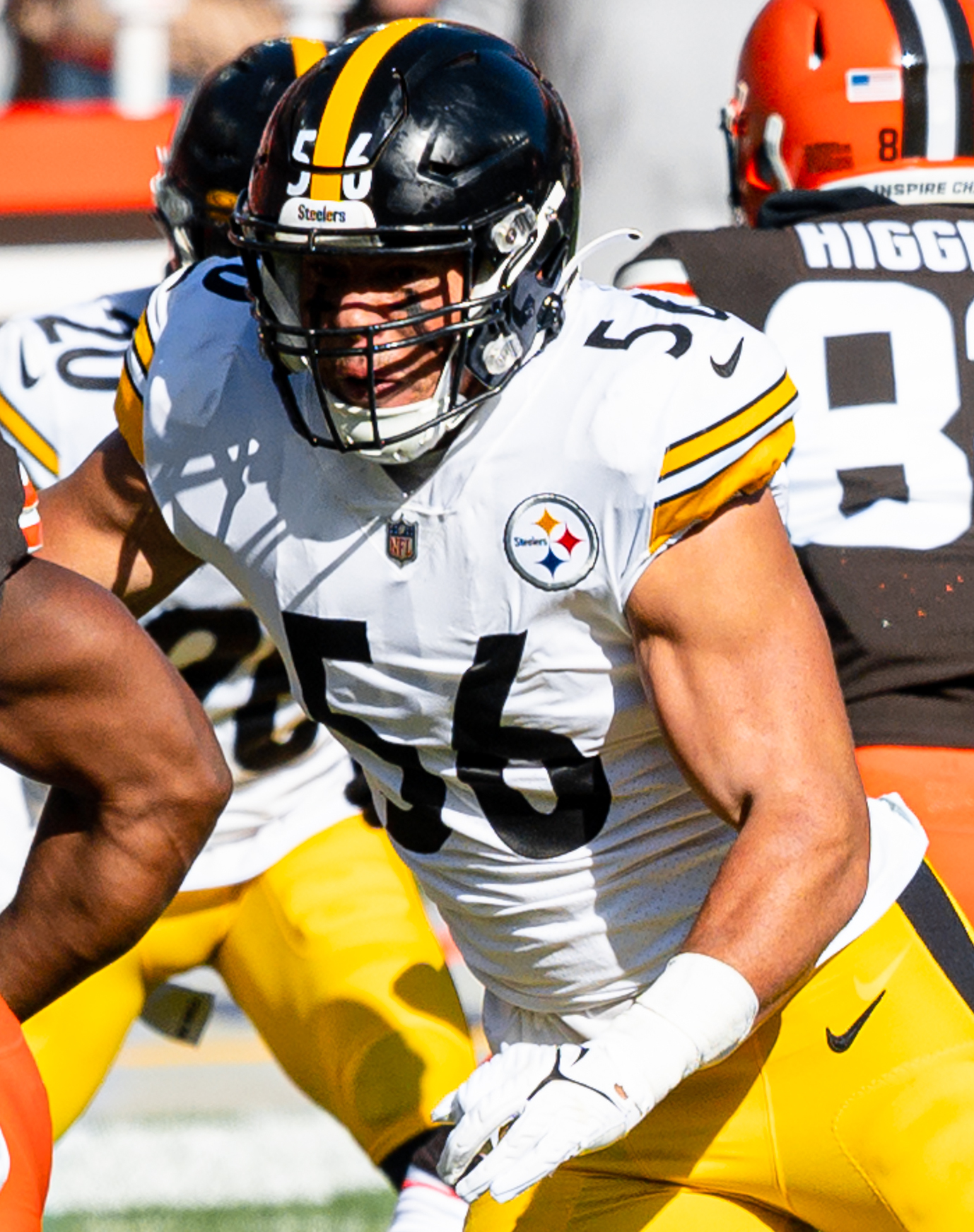
Highsmith during a game against the Cleveland Browns in 2021

In week 17, against the Browns, Highsmith had two sacks in the 26–14 victory. In the 2021 season, he had six sacks, 74 total tackles (46 solo), and one forced fumble in 16 games and starts. He had one sack in the Steelers' Wild Card Round loss to the Chiefs.

=== 2022 ===
In the regular season opener, Highsmith had three sacks and a forced fumble in the 23–20 overtime victory over the Cincinnati Bengals. In week 10, Highsmith had five tackles, two sacks, a tackle for loss and a forced fumble in a 20–10 win over the New Orleans Saints, earning American Football Conference (AFC) Defensive Player of the Week. He closed out the 2022 regular season with 2.5 sacks in a 28–14 win over the Browns.

He finished the 2022 season with 63 tackles, a team high 14.5 sacks, and league-leading five forced fumbles.

=== 2023 ===
On July 19, 2023, Highsmith signed a four-year, $68 million contract extension with the Steelers. The contract includes $27.74 million guaranteed and a signing bonus of $16 million. During week 2 of the 2023 season against the Browns, Highsmith intercepted the first pass from Browns quarterback Deshaun Watson and returned it 30 yards for his first NFL touchdown. He also recorded seven tackles and a forced fumble on Watson, which was recovered by Steelers teammate T. J. Watt for what eventually became the game-winning touchdown as the Steelers held on to win, 26–22. For his performance, Highsmith was named the AFC Defensive Player of the Week. In the 2023 season, he finished with seven sacks, 57 tackles, two interceptions, three passes defended, and two forced fumbles. He had a sack in the Steelers' Wild Card Round loss to the Bills.

=== 2024 ===
In the 2024 season, Highsmith had six sacks, 45 tackles, and two passes defended. He had a sack in the Steelers' Wild Card Round loss to the Ravens.

=== 2025 ===
In Week 9, Highsmith recorded four tackles, three tackles for loss, two sacks, and a forced fumble in a 27–20 win over the Indianapolis Colts. He was named AFC Defensive Player of the Week for Week 9. He finished with a team high 9.5 sacks for the 2025 season to go with 50 total tackles (36 solo) and three passes defended.

== NFL career statistics ==
Legend
	Led the league
**Bold**	Career high

=== Regular season ===
Year	Team	Games		Tackles						Interceptions					Fumbles			
Year	Team	GP	GS	Total	Solo	Ast	Sack	TFL	QBHits	Int	Yards	Avg	TD	PD	FF	FR	Yds	TD
2020	PIT	16	5	48	30	18	2.0	5	6	1	2	2.0	0	1	0	0	0	0
2021	PIT	16	16	**74**	**46**	**28**	6.0	**15**	15	0	0	0.0	0	0	1	0	0	0
2022	PIT	17	17	63	38	25	**14.5**	12	**20**	0	0	0.0	0	1	**5**	0	0	0
2023	PIT	17	17	57	34	23	7.0	8	18	**2**	**30**	**15.0**	**1**	**3**	2	0	0	0
2024	PIT	11	11	45	28	17	6.0	9	13	0	0	0.0	0	2	1	0	0	0
2025	PIT	13	13	50	36	14	9.5	**15**	19	0	0	0.0	0	**3**	1	0	0	0
2026	PIT	9	9	19	8	11	3.5	5	9	0	0	0.0	0	1	0	0	0	0
Career		99	88	356	220	136	48.5	69	100	3	32	10.7	1	11	10	0	0	0

=== Postseason ===
Year	Team	Games		Tackles						Interceptions					Fumbles			
Year	Team	GP	GS	Total	Solo	Ast	Sack	TFL	QBHits	Int	Yards	Avg	TD	PD	FF	FR	Yds	TD
2020	PIT	1	1	2	1	**1**	0.0	0	0	0	0	0.0	0	0	0	0	0	0
2021	PIT	1	1	**3**	**2**	**1**	**1.0**	**1**	**1**	0	0	0.0	0	0	0	0	0	0
2023	PIT	1	1	**3**	**2**	**1**	**1.0**	**1**	**1**	0	0	0.0	0	0	0	0	0	0
2024	PIT	1	1	2	1	**1**	**1.0**	**1**	**1**	0	0	0.0	0	0	0	0	0	0
2025	PIT	1	1	1	0	**1**	0.0	0	0	0	0	0.0	0	**1**	0	0	0	0
Career		5	5	11	6	5	3.0	3	3	0	0	0.0	0	1	0	0	0	0

== Personal life ==
Highsmith is a Christian.

In June 2022, Highsmith married Alyssa Ungrady, who competed in track and field for Charlotte.

Highsmith’s devotion to community service in the Pittsburgh, Wilmington and Charlotte areas has earned him recognition as the Pittsburgh Steelers’ nominee for the Walter Payton NFL Man of the Year Award in 2025. Through his foundation, the Alex Highsmith Family Foundation, he is focus on empowering the next generation through programs that focus Physical Fitness, Nutrition, Athletic Preparation, Family Involvement, Academic Success, and Emotional and Social Support. Starting in 2021, his foundation has hosted annual youth football camps and fundraisers to raise funds to provide kids free essentials such as backpacks, haircuts, hygiene kits, books, and meals.
