= Will Healy =

American football player and coach (born 1985)

Current position
- Title: Head coach
- Team: East Tennessee State
- Conference: SoCon
- Record: 14–9

Biographical details
- Born: January 16, 1985 (age 41); Chattanooga, Tennessee, U.S.
- Education: University of Richmond

Playing career
- 2003: Air Force
- 2004–2008: Richmond
- Position: Quarterback

Coaching career (HC unless noted)
- 2009–2015: Chattanooga (WR)
- 2016–2018: Austin Peay
- 2019–2022: Charlotte
- 2023: UCF (AHC/OA/adv.)
- 2024: Georgia State (AHC/RB)
- 2025–present: East Tennessee State

Head coaching record
- Overall: 42–54
- Bowls: 0–1

Accomplishments and honors

Awards
- Eddie Robinson Award (2017); OVC Coach of the Year (2017)

William Livingston Healy (born January 16, 1985) is an American college football coach. He is the head coach for the East Tennessee State Buccaneers, a position he has held since 2024. He previously was the head coach at the University of North Carolina at Charlotte (2019-2022) and Austin Peay (2016-2018).

In just his second season at Austin Peay, Healy spearheaded one of the most remarkable turnarounds in college football history. At the time he was the 2nd youngest football coach in Division 1 football. Coming into the 2017 season with just one win in the last four years, Healy guided the Governors to an 8–4 mark, including an 8–1 record against Football Championship Subdivision competition. Austin Peay tallied seven OVC victories – the most conference wins in program history.

== Playing career ==
Healy, a native of Chattanooga, Tennessee, was an all-state quarterback at Boyd-Buchanan School where he still holds the Chattanooga-area career passing record (7,700+yds). After signing a football scholarship at Air Force coming out of high school, he then transferred to the University of Richmond to play quarterback for Dave Clawson and Mike London. The Spiders went on to win the FCS National Championship in 2008, Healy's senior season, with the game being played in his hometown of Chattanooga, Tennessee. He then started his coaching career for coach Russ Huesman at The University of Tennessee at Chattanooga in 2009.

== Coaching career ==
=== Early coaching career ===
After spending his first season at the University of Tennessee at Chattanooga as the quarterbacks coach for record-setting quarterback B. J. Coleman, Healy moved to the wide receivers coaching position. He spent six more years at Chattanooga, with titles of recruiting coordinator and passing game coordinator. As the recruiting coordinator, Healy manufactured back-to-back top recruiting classes in FCS football.

=== Austin Peay ===
Healy was announced as the 19th head coach at Austin Peay State University on December 20, 2015. His 2016 recruiting class was ranked top 5 in FCS football, followed by the #1 ranked class in 2017 according to 247sports.

During the 2017 season, a cbssports.com article asserted that "Will Healy is doing a miraculous job at Austin Peay.". Healy's Governors finished the season 8–1 in the FCS with its only FCS loss to Jacksonville State. The 7–1 mark in the OVC set a school record for Austin Peay and ties the most wins ever in a season. These accomplishments garnered Healy with the OVC Coach of the Year Award and the Eddie Robinson Award by STATS for the FCS National Coach of the year."

=== Charlotte 49ers ===
On December 5, 2018, Healy was announced as the Charlotte 49ers second head football coach.

On August 29, 2019, Healy recorded his first win as the head coach of Charlotte in a 49–28 victory against Gardner–Webb. On September 14, he recorded his first career victory over a Football Bowl Subdivision (FBS) opponent with a 52–17 win against UMass. Healy would record his first C-USA win against North Texas on October 26. Healy and the 49ers both would reach bowl eligibility for the first time following a home victory over Marshall on November 23 in his first season at the helm.

After achieving the program's first winning and bowl season, Healy's contract was altered to extend his terms of service with a slight raise and additional achievement bonuses for himself and his staff.

On September 3, 2021, Healy would record both his and the program's first win over a Power 5 opponent with a 31 to 28 win over the Duke Blue Devils.

Charlotte fired Healy on October 23, 2022, after a 1–7 start to the season. Offensive line coach Peter Rossomando took over as interim head coach.

=== UCF ===
On February 6, 2023, Healy was hired by UCF to be the Assistant Head coach, advisor to the head coach & senior offensive analyst for the 2023 season.

=== East Tennessee State ===
On December 12, 2024, Healy was announced as the head coach of East Tennessee State football.

== Head coaching record ==
Year	Team	Overall	Conference	Standing	Bowl/playoffs
Austin Peay Governors (Ohio Valley Conference) (2016–2018)
2016	Austin Peay	0–11	0–8	9th	
2017	Austin Peay	8–4	7–1	2nd	
2018	Austin Peay	5–6	3–5	T–6th	
Austin Peay:		13–21	10–14		
Charlotte 49ers (Conference USA) (2019–2022)
2019	Charlotte	7–6	5–3	4th (East)	L Bahamas
2020	Charlotte	2–4	2–2	4th (East)	
2021	Charlotte	5–7	3–5	T–5th (East)	
2022	Charlotte	1–7 (Note: Charlotte fired Healy with four games remaining.)	0–4		
Charlotte:		15–24	10–14		
East Tennessee State Buccaneers (Southern Conference) (2025–present)
2025	East Tennessee State	7–5	5–3	T–3rd	
2026	East Tennessee State	7–4	5–2		
East Tennessee State:		14–9	10–5		
Total:		42–54			
