= Cameron Clark (American football) =

American football player (born 1997)

No. 72
- Position: Offensive tackle

Personal information
- Born: November 16, 1997 (age 28); Greensboro, North Carolina, U.S.
- Listed height: 6 ft 4 in (1.93 m)
- Listed weight: 308 lb (140 kg)

Career information
- High school: Ben L. Smith (Greensboro)
- College: Charlotte (2015–2019)
- NFL draft: 2020: 4th round, 129th overall pick

Career history
- New York Jets (2020–2021)

Awards and highlights
- First-team All-Conference USA (2019)
- Stats at Pro Football Reference

Cameron Clark (born November 16, 1997) is an American former football offensive tackle and coach. He played college football at Charlotte. He was selected by the New York Jets in the fourth round of the 2020 NFL draft, but was forced to retire in 2022 before ever playing in an NFL game.

== College career ==
After playing at Ben L. Smith High School in Greensboro, North Carolina, Clark committed to Charlotte on June 19, 2014, choosing the 49ers over Appalachian State, James Madison and Old Dominion. Clark redshirted his true freshman year, recorded two starts at left tackle his redshirt freshman year, and started eight games during his sophomore season on the way to being named the 49ers' offensive MVP. Clark was later named a team captain his junior and senior seasons.

By the end of his senior season, Clark had set the Charlotte program record for games played in, setting the mark at 49 contests. He named a member of the first-team all-Conference USA roster after the regular season concluded. After his senior season, Clark participated in the East-West Shrine Game and 2020 NFL Scouting Combine.

== Professional career ==
Clark was selected by the New York Jets with a fourth-round pick (129th overall) in the 2020 NFL draft. He was placed on injured reserve on September 7, 2020. He was activated on October 24.

On August 17, 2021, Clark was placed on injured reserve stemming from a spinal cord injury, ending his season.

Clark retired from football on February 2, 2022, citing a risk of paralysis due to the spinal cord injury. He was then waived by the Jets on April 26, 2022 following a failed physical.

== Personal life ==
While he played football at Ben L. Smith High School in Greensboro, North Carolina, Clark attended another Greensboro-area school, The Academy at Smith High School.
