= 2020 Conference USA football season =

- League: NCAA Division I Football Bowl Subdivision
- Sport: Football
- Duration: September 3, 2019 to December 18, 2020
- Teams: 13†

2021 NFL Draft
- Top draft pick: DT Milton Williams, Louisiana Tech
- Picked by: Philadelphia Eagles, 73rd overall

Regular season
- East champions: Marshall
- West champions: UAB

Conference USA Championship Game
- Champions: UAB
- Runners-up: Marshall
- Finals MVP: Spencer Brown, UAB

Seasons
- ← 2019 2021 →

2020 Conference USA football standings
| | Conf. | | | Overall |
| Team | W | | L | W | | L |
|---|---|---|---|---|---|---|
East Division
| Marshall xy | 4 | – | 1 | 7 | – | 3 |
| Florida Atlantic | 4 | – | 2 | 5 | – | 4 |
| Western Kentucky | 4 | – | 3 | 5 | – | 7 |
| Charlotte | 2 | – | 2 | 2 | – | 4 |
| Middle Tennessee | 2 | – | 4 | 3 | – | 6 |
| FIU | 0 | – | 3 | 0 | – | 5 |
West Division
| UAB xy$ | 3 | – | 1 | 6 | – | 3 |
| UTSA | 5 | – | 2 | 7 | – | 5 |
| Louisiana Tech | 4 | – | 2 | 5 | – | 5 |
| North Texas | 3 | – | 4 | 4 | – | 6 |
| Rice | 2 | – | 3 | 2 | – | 3 |
| Southern Miss | 2 | – | 4 | 3 | – | 7 |
| UTEP | 0 | – | 4 | 3 | – | 5 |
Championship: UAB 22, Marshall 13
$ – Conference champion; x – Division champion/co-champions; y – Championship game participant; Note: Due to COVID-19, Old Dominion opted out of the season.

The 2020 Conference USA football season was the 25th season of college football play for Conference USA (C-USA). It was played from September 3, 2020 until December 18, 2020. The league consisted of 14 members in two divisions. It was part of the 2020 NCAA Division I FBS football season.

== Preseason ==
=== Preseason Awards ===
The conference preseason awards were released On August 25.

- Preseason Offensive Player of the Year: Brenden Knox, Junior, RB, Marshall
- Preseason Defensive Player of the Year: DeAngelo Malone, Senior, DE, WKU
- Preseason Special Teams Player of the Year: John Haggerty, Sophomore, Punter, WKU

Offense
| Position | Player | Class | Team |
|---|---|---|---|
| QB | Jack Abraham | Senior | Southern Miss |
| RB | Justin Henderson | Senior | Louisiana Tech |
| RB | Brenden Knox | Junior | Marshall |
| OL | D'Antne Demery | Senior | FIU |
| OL | Desmond Noel | Senior | Florida Atlantic |
| OL | Kody Russey | Senior | Louisiana Tech |
| OL | Cain Madden | Senior | Marshall |
| OL | Jordan Meredith | Senior | WKU |
| TE | Jason Pirtle | Senior | North Texas |
| WR | Jaelon Darden | Senior | North Texas |
| WR | Tim Jones | Senior | Southern Miss |
| WR | Austin Watkins Jr. | Senior | UAB |

Defense
| Position | Player | Class | Team |
|---|---|---|---|
| DL | Markees Watts | Junior | Charlotte |
| DL | Willie Baker | Senior | Louisiana Tech |
| DL | Dion Novil | Senior | North Texas |
| DL | Jordan Smith | Junior | UAB |
| DL | DeAngelo Malone | Senior | WKU |
| LB | Tavante Beckett | Senior | Marshall |
| LB | Blaze Alldredge | Senior | Rice |
| LB | Kristopher Moll | Senior | UAB |
| DB | Nazeeh Johnson | Senior | Marshall |
| DB | Ben DeLuca | Senior | Charlotte |
| DB | Reed Blankenship | Senior | Middle Tennessee |
| DB | Ky’el Hemby | Senior | Southern Miss |

Specialists
| Position | Player | Class | Team |
|---|---|---|---|
| K | Ethan Mooney | Junior | North Texas |
| P | John Haggerty | Senior | WKU |
| KR | Deion Hair-Griffin | Junior | North Texas |
| PR | Talik Keaton | Sophomore | Marshall |
| LS | Reeves Blankenship | Junior | Louisiana Tech |

=== Media predictions ===
No 2020 Preseason Media Poll was released by Conference USA.

== Head coaches ==
Note: All stats shown are before the start of the 2020 season.

| Team | Head coach | Years at school | Overall record | Record at school | CUSA Record |
|---|---|---|---|---|---|
| Charlotte | Will Healy | 2 | 20-27 | 7-6 | 5-3 |
| FIU | Butch Davis | 3 | 86–59 | 23-16 | 14–10 |
| Florida Atlantic | Willie Taggart | 1 | 56–62 | 0–0 | 0–0 |
| Louisiana Tech | Skip Holtz | 8 | 144–107 | 56–36 | 37–19 |
| Marshall | Doc Holliday | 11 | 78–51 | 78–51 | 49–29 |
| Middle Tennessee | Rick Stockstill | 15 | 91–88 | 91–88 | 68–41 |
| North Texas | Seth Littrell | 5 | 28–26 | 28–26 | 18–14 |
| Old Dominion | Ricky Rahne | 1 | 0–0 | 0–0 | 0–0 |
| Rice | Mike Bloomgren | 3 | 5–20 | 5–20 | 4–12 |
| Southern Miss | Jay Hopson | 5 | 60–39 | 28–22 | 20-12 |
| UAB | Bill Clark | 5 | 45–22 | 34–19 | 23–9 |
| UTEP | Dana Dimel | 3 | 32-61 | 2–22 | 1-15 |
| UTSA | Jeff Traylor | 1 | 0–0 | 0–0 | 0–0 |
| Western Kentucky | Tyson Helton | 2 | 9–4 | 9–4 | 6–2 |

== Rankings ==
| | | Pre | Wk 3 | Wk 4 | Wk 5 | Wk 6 | Wk 7 | Wk 8 | Wk 9 | Wk 10 | Wk 11 | Wk 12 | Wk 13 | Wk 14 | Wk 15 | Final |
|---|---|---|---|---|---|---|---|---|---|---|---|---|---|---|---|---|
| Charlotte | AP | | | | | | | | | | | | | | | |
| Charlotte | C | | | | | | | | | | | | | | | |
| Charlotte | CFP | Not released | | | | | | | | | | | | | | |
| FIU | AP | | | | | | | | | | | | | | | |
| FIU | C | | | | | | | | | | | | | | | |
| FIU | CFP | Not released | | | | | | | | | | | | | | |
| Florida Atlantic | AP | | | | | | | | | | | | RV | | | |
| Florida Atlantic | C | | | | | | | | | | | | | RV | | |
| Florida Atlantic | CFP | Not released | | | | | | | | | | | | | | |
| Louisiana Tech | AP | | | | | | RV | | | | | | | | | |
| Louisiana Tech | C | | | RV | RV | | RV | | | | | | | | | |
| Louisiana Tech | CFP | Not released | | | | | | | | | | | | | | |
| Marshall | AP | | RV | | RV | RV | RV | 22 | 19 | 16 | 16 | 15 | 17 | 15 | | |
| Marshall | C | | RV | RV | RV | RV | RV | 25 | 18 | 15 | 15 | 15 | 16 | 15 | | |
| Marshall | CFP | Not released | | | | | | | | | | | 21 | | | |
| Middle Tennessee | AP | | | | | | | | | | | | | | | |
| Middle Tennessee | C | | | | | | | | | | | | | | | |
| Middle Tennessee | CFP | Not released | | | | | | | | | | | | | | |
| North Texas | AP | | | | | | | | | | | | | | | |
| North Texas | C | | | | | | | | | | | | | | | |
| North Texas | CFP | Not released | | | | | | | | | | | | | | |
| Old Dominion | AP | | | | | | | | | | | | | | | |
| Old Dominion | C | | | | | | | | | | | | | | | |
| Old Dominion | CFP | Not released | | | | | | | | | | | | | | |
| Rice | AP | | | | | | | | | | | | | | | |
| Rice | C | | | | | | | | | | | | | | | |
| Rice | CFP | Not released | | | | | | | | | | | | | | |
| Southern Miss | AP | | | | | | | | | | | | | | | |
| Southern Miss | C | | | | | | | | | | | | | | | |
| Southern Miss | CFP | Not released | | | | | | | | | | | | | | |
| UAB | AP | RV | RV | RV | RV | RV | RV | RV | | | | | | | | |
| UAB | C | | | | RV | RV | RV | RV | | | | | | | | |
| UAB | CFP | Not released | | | | | | | | | | | | | | |
| UTEP | AP | | | | | | | | | | | | | | | |
| UTEP | C | | | | | | | | | | | | | | | |
| UTEP | CFP | Not released | | | | | | | | | | | | | | |
| UTSA | AP | | | | | | | | | | | | | | | |
| UTSA | C | | | | | | | | | | | | | | | |
| UTSA | CFP | Not released | | | | | | | | | | | | | | |
| WKU | AP | | | | | | | | | | | | | | | |
| WKU | C | | | | | | | | | | | | | | | |
| WKU | CFP | Not released | | | | | | | | | | | | | | |

Legend
| | Improvement in ranking |
| | Drop in ranking |
| | Not ranked previous week |
| | No change in ranking from previous week |
| RV | Received votes but were not ranked in Top 25 of poll |
| т | Tied with team above or below also with this symbol |

== Schedule ==
Old Dominion suspended all Fall sports including football for the 2020 season. Rice suspended the start of the football season till September 26 on August 8. Rice pushed the start of their football season back an additional month, not starting play until October 24.

=== Regular season ===
Index to colors and formatting
C–USA member won
C–USA member lost
C–USA teams in **bold**

==== Week One ====
| Date | Time | Visiting team | Home team | Site | TV | Result | Attendance | Ref. |
|---|---|---|---|---|---|---|---|---|
| September 3 | 8:00 p.m. EDT | Central Arkansas | **UAB** | Legion Field • Birmingham, AL | ESPN3 | **W** 45–35 | 12,716 | |
| September 3 | 9:00 p.m. EDT | South Alabama | **Southern Miss** | M.M. Roberts Stadium • Hattiesburg, MS | CBSSN | **L** 21–32 | 7,500 | |
| September 5 | 1:30 p.m. EDT | **Middle Tennessee** | Army | Michie Stadium • West Point, NY | CBSSN | **L** 0–42 | 5,249 | |
| September 5 | 1:30 p.m. EDT | Eastern Kentucky | **Marshall** | Joan C. Edwards Stadium • Huntington, WV | ESPN | **W** 59–0 | 12,000 | |
| September 5 | 7:30 p.m. EDT | Houston Baptist | **North Texas** | Apogee Stadium • Denton, TX | ESPN3 | **W** 57–31 | 7,611 | |
| September 5 | 9:00 p.m. EDT | Stephen F. Austin | **UTEP** | Sun Bowl Stadium • El Paso, TX | ESPN3 | **W** 24–14 | 6,047 | |
^{#}Rankings from AP Poll released prior to game.

==== Week Two ====
| Date | Time | Visiting team | Home team | Site | TV | Result | Attendance | Ref. |
|---|---|---|---|---|---|---|---|---|
| September 10 | 8:00 p.m. EDT | UAB | Miami (FL) | Hard Rock Stadium • Miami Gardens, FL | ACCN | **L** 14–31 | 8,153 | |
| September 12 | 8:00 p.m. EDT | Marshall | ECU | Dowdy-Ficklen Stadium • Greenville, NC | ESPN | **POSTPONED** | NA | |
| September 12 | 12:00 p.m. EDT | Charlotte | App State | Kidd Brewer Stadium • Boone, NC | ESPN2 | **L** 20–35 | 0 | |
| September 12 | 3:30 p.m. EDT | UTSA | Texas State | Bobcat Stadium • San Marcos, TX | ESPN2 | **W** 51–48 ^{2OT} | 7,500 | |
| September 12 | 7:00 p.m. EDT | UTEP | No. 14 Texas | Darrell K Royal - Texas Memorial Stadium • Austin, TX | LHN | **L** 3–59 | 15,337 | |
| September 12 | 7:00 p.m. EDT | Western Kentucky | Louisville | Cardinal Stadium • Louisville, KY | ACCN | **L** 21–35 | 11,179 | |
^{#}Rankings from AP Poll released prior to game.

==== Week Three ====
| Date | Time | Visiting team | Home team | Site | TV | Result | Attendance | Ref. |
|---|---|---|---|---|---|---|---|---|
| September 19 | 12:00 p.m. EDT | Liberty | **Western Kentucky** | Houchens Industries–L. T. Smith Stadium • Bowling Green, KY | ESPNU | **L** 24–30 | 4,276 | |
| September 19 | 12:00 p.m. EDT | **Charlotte** | No. 12 UNC | Kenan Memorial Stadium • Chapel Hill, NC | ACCN | **CANCELED** | NA | |
| September 19 | 2:30 p.m. EDT | Troy | **Middle Tennessee** | Johnny "Red" Floyd Stadium • Murfreesboro, TN | ESPN | **L** 14–47 | 6,000 | |
| September 19 | 3:30 p.m. EDT | **Florida Atlantic** | Georgia Southern | Allen E. Paulson Stadium • Statesboro, GA | | **POSTPONED** | NA | |
| September 19 | 3:00 p.m. EDT | Stephen F. Austin | **UTSA** | Alamodome • San Antonio, TX | ESPN2 | **W** 24–10 | 6,611 | |
| September 19 | 3:45 p.m. EDT | No. 23 App State | **Marshall** | Joan C. Edwards Stadium • Huntington, WV | CBS | **W** 17–7 | 12,050 | |
| September 19 | 6:00 p.m. EDT | SMU | **North Texas** | Apogee Stadium • Denton, TX | CBSSN | **L** 35–65 | 8,464 | |
| September 19 | 6:30 p.m. EDT | **Louisiana Tech** | **Southern Miss** | M.M. Roberts Stadium • Hattiesburg, MS | ESPN2 | **LT** 31–30 | 7,140 | |
| September 19 | 7:05 p.m. EDT | Abilene Christian | **UTEP** | Sun Bowl Stadium • El Paso, TX | ESPN3 | **W** 17–13 | 6,056 | |
^{#}Rankings from AP Poll released prior to game.

==== Week Four ====
| Date | Time | Visiting team | Home team | Site | TV | Result | Attendance | Ref. |
|---|---|---|---|---|---|---|---|---|
| September 24 | 7:30 p.m. EDT | **UAB** | South Alabama | Hancock Whitney Stadium • Mobile, AL | ESPN | **W** 42-10 | 5,766 | |
| September 25 | 8:00 p.m. EDT | **Middle Tennessee** | **UTSA** | Alamodome • San Antonio, TX | CBSSN | **UTSA** 37-35 | 6,182 | |
| September 26 | p.m. EDT | Georgia State | **Charlotte** | Jerry Richardson Stadium • Charlotte, NC | | **POSTPONED** | NA | |
| September 26 | p.m. EDT | South Florida | **Florida Atlantic** | FAU Stadium • Boca Raton, FL | | **POSTPONED** | NA | |
| September 26 | p.m. EDT | **North Texas** | Houston | TDECU Stadium • Houston, TX | | **CANCELED** | NA | |
| September 26 | 1:00 p.m. EDT | **FIU** | Liberty | Williams Stadium • Lynchburg, VA | ESPNU | **L** 34-36 | 1,000 | |
| September 26 | 2:30 p.m. EDT | Tulane | **Southern Miss** | M.M. Roberts Stadium • Hattiesburg, MS | Stadium | **L** 24-66 | 0 | |
| September 26 | 3:30 p.m. EDT | **UTEP** | Louisiana-Monroe | Malone Stadium • Monroe, LA | ESPN2 | **W** 31-6 | 5,491 | |
| September 26 | 7:00 p.m. EDT | Houston Baptist | **Louisiana Tech** | Joe Aillet Stadium • Ruston, LA | ESPN3 | **W** 66-38 | 7,140 | |
^{#}Rankings from AP Poll released prior to game.

==== Week Five ====
| Date | Time | Visiting team | Home team | Site | TV | Result | Attendance | Ref. |
|---|---|---|---|---|---|---|---|---|
| October 2 | 9:00 p.m. EDT | Louisiana Tech | No. 22 BYU | LaVell Edwards Stadium • Provo, UT | ESPN2 | **L** 14-45 | 0 | |
| October 3 | p.m. EDT | Rice | **Marshall** | Joan C. Edwards Stadium • Huntington, WV | | **POSTPONED** | NA | |
| October 3 | 12:30 p.m. EDT | UTSA | **UAB** | Legion Field • Birmingham, AL | Stadium | **UAB** 21-13 | 12,547 | |
| October 3 | 4:00 p.m. EDT | Charlotte | **Florida Atlantic** | FAU Stadium • Boca Raton, FL | ESPNU | **FAU** 21-17 | 5,675 | |
| October 3 | 5:00 p.m. EDT | Western Kentucky | **Middle Tennessee** | Johnny "Red" Floyd Stadium • Murfreesboro, TN | ESPN3 | **WKU** 20-17 | 6,500 | |
| October 3 | 7:30 p.m. EDT | Southern Miss | **North Texas** | Apogee Stadium • Denton, TX | Stadium | **USM** 41-31 | 6,490 | |
^{#}Rankings from AP Poll released prior to game.

==== Week Six ====
| Date | Time | Visiting team | Home team | Site | TV | Result | Attendance | Ref. |
|---|---|---|---|---|---|---|---|---|
| October 10 | p.m. EDT | Florida Atlantic | **Southern Miss** | M.M. Roberts Stadium • Hattiesburg, MS | | **POSTPONED** | NA | |
| October 10 | p.m. EDT | UAB | **Rice** | Rice Stadium • Houston, TX | | **POSTPONED** | NA | |
| October 10 | 3:30 p.m. EDT | UTSA | No. 15 BYU | LaVell Edwards Stadium • Provo, UT | ESPN2 | **L** 20-27 | 0 | |
| October 10 | 4:00 p.m. EDT | Middle Tennessee | **FIU** | Riccardo Silva Stadium • Miami, FL | ESPNU | **MTSU** 31-28 | 2,213 | |
| October 10 | 7:30 p.m. EDT | Marshall | **Western Kentucky** | Houchens Industries–L. T. Smith Stadium • Bowling Green, KY | Stadium | **MU** 38-14 | 4,428 | |
| October 10 | 7:30 p.m. EDT | UTEP | **Louisiana Tech** | Joe Aillet Stadium • Ruston, LA | ESPN2 | **LT** 21-17 | 7,140 | |
| October 10 | 8:00 p.m. EDT | Charlotte | **North Texas** | Apogee Stadium • Denton, TX | ESPNU | **CHAR** 49-21 | 6,864 | |
^{#}Rankings from AP Poll released prior to game.

==== Week Seven ====
| Date | Time | Visiting team | Home team | Site | TV | Result | Attendance | Ref. |
|---|---|---|---|---|---|---|---|---|
| October 17 | p.m. EDT | **FIU** | Charlotte | Jerry Richardson Stadium • Charlotte, NC | | **POSTPONED** | NA | |
| October 17 | p.m. EDT | **Southern Miss** | UTEP | Sun Bowl Stadium • El Paso, TX | | **POSTPONED** | NA | |
| October 17 | 1:30 p.m. EDT | **Western Kentucky** | UAB | Legion Field • Birmingham, AL | Stadium | **UAB** 37-14 | 11.098 | |
| October 17 | 1:30 p.m. EDT | Army | UTSA | Alamodome • San Antonio, TX | CBSSN | **L** 16-28 | 7,887 | |
| October 17 | 5:00 p.m. EDT | **North Texas** | Middle Tennessee | Johnny "Red" Floyd Stadium • Murfreesboro, TN | Stadium | **UNT** 52-35 | 5,000 | |
| October 17 | 7:00 p.m. EDT | **Marshall** | Louisiana Tech | Joe Alliet Stadium • Ruston, LA | CBSSN | **MU** 35-17 | 7,140 | |
^{#}Rankings from AP Poll released prior to game.

==== Week Eight ====
| Date | Time | Visiting team | Home team | Site | TV | Result | Attendance | Ref. |
|---|---|---|---|---|---|---|---|---|
| October 23 | 7:00 p.m. EDT | Jacksonville State | **FIU** | Riccardo Silva Stadium • Miami, FL | ESPN3 | **L** 10-19 | 1,041 | |
| October 23 | 8:00 p.m. EDT | Louisiana | **UAB** | Legion Field • Birmingham, AL | CBSSN | **L** 20-24 | 11,610 | |
| October 23 | 8:00 p.m. EDT | **Middle Tennessee** | **Rice** | Rice Stadium • Houston, TX | ESPN3 | **MTSU** 34-40 ^{2OT} | 0 | |
| October 24 | 12:00 p.m. EDT | **UTEP** | **Charlotte** | Jerry Richardson Stadium • Charlotte, NC | ESPN+ | **CHAR** 38-28 | 1,042 | |
| October 24 | 2:30 p.m. EDT | **Florida Atlantic** | No. 22 **Marshall** | Joan C. Edwards Stadium • Huntington, WV | Stadium | **MU** 20-9 | 12,002 | |
| October 24 | 4:00 p.m. EDT | Chattanooga | **Western Kentucky** | Houchens Industries–L. T. Smith Stadium • Bowling Green, KY | ESPN3 | **W** 13-10 | 3,905 | |
| October 24 | 8:00 p.m. EDT | **Louisiana Tech** | **UTSA** | Alamodome • San Antonio, TX | ESPNU | **UTSA** 27-26 | 6,114 | |
^{#}Rankings from AP Poll released prior to game.

==== Week Nine ====
| Date | Time | Visiting team | Home team | Site | TV | Result | Attendance | Ref. |
|---|---|---|---|---|---|---|---|---|
| October 30 | p.m. EDT | Marshall | **FIU** | Riccardo Silva Stadium • Miami, FL | | **POSTPONED** | NA | |
| October 31 | p.m. EDT | North Texas | **UTEP** | Sun Bowl Stadium • El Paso, TX | | **POSTPONED** | NA | |
| October 31 | 12:00 p.m. EDT | UTSA | **Florida Atlantic** | FAU Stadium • Boca Raton, FL | Stadium | **FAU** 24-3 | 5,026 | |
| October 31 | 3:00 p.m. EDT | Rice | **Southern Miss** | M.M. Roberts Stadium • Hattiesburg, MS | ESPN3 | **Rice** 30-6 | 0 | |
| October 31 | 3:30 p.m. EDT | UAB | **Louisiana Tech** | Joe Aillet Stadium • Ruston, LA | Stadium | **LT** 37-34 ^{2OT} | 7,140 | |
| October 31 | 7:00 p.m. EDT | Charlotte | Duke | Wallace Wade Stadium • Durham, NC | ACCRSN | **L** 19-53 | 0 | |
| October 31 | 10:15 p.m. EDT | Western Kentucky | No. 11 BYU | LaVell Edwards Stadium • Provo, UT | ESPN | **L** 10-41 | 6,843 | |
^{#}Rankings from AP Poll released prior to game.

==== Week Ten ====
| Date | Time | Visiting team | Home team | Site | TV | Result | Attendance | Ref. |
|---|---|---|---|---|---|---|---|---|
| November 7 | 2:30 p.m. EST | UMass | Marshall | Joan C. Edwards Stadium • Huntington, WV | ESPN+ | **W** 51-10 | - | |
| November 7 | 3:30 p.m. EST | **Charlotte** | Middle Tennessee | Johnny "Red" Floyd Stadium • Murfreesbooro, TN | ESPN+ | **POSTPONED** | NA | |
| November 7 | 3:00 p.m. EST | North Alabama | Southern Miss | M.M. Roberts Stadium • Hattiesburg, MS | ESPN3 | **W** 24-13 | - | |
| November 7 | 3:30 p.m. EST | **UTSA** | Rice | Rice Stadium • Houston, TX | ESPN3 | **POSTPONED** | NA | |
| November 7 | 4:00 p.m. EST | **FIU** | UTEP | Sun Bowl Stadium • El Paso, TX | ESPN3 | **POSTPONED** | NA | |
| November 7 | 6:00 p.m. EST | **Western Kentucky** | Florida Atlantic | FAU Stadium • Boca Raton, FL | Stadium | **FAU** 10-6 | 5,292 | |
| November 7 | 7:00 p.m. EST | **Louisiana Tech** | North Texas | Apogee Stadium • Denton, TX | CBSSN | **POSTPONED** | NA | |
^{#}Rankings from AP Poll released prior to game.

==== Week Eleven ====
| Date | Time | Visiting team | Home team | Site | TV | Result | Attendance | Ref. |
|---|---|---|---|---|---|---|---|---|
| November 13 | 7:00 p.m. EST | **Florida Atlantic** | FIU | Riccardo Silva Stadium • Miami, FL | CBSSN | **FAU** 38-19 | 0 | |
| November 14 | 12:00 p.m. EST | Gardner-Webb | Charlotte | Jerry Richardson Stadium • Charlotte, NC | ESPN3 | **CANCELED** | NA | |
| November 14 | 1:30 p.m. EST | **Middle Tennessee** | Marshall | Joan C. Edwards Stadium • Huntington, WV | CBSSN | **MU** 42-14 | - | |
| November 14 | 3:00 p.m. EST | **UTEP** | UTSA | Alamodome • San Antonio, TX | ESPN+ | **UTSA** 52-21 | - | |
| November 14 | 3:30 p.m. EST | **Southern Miss** | Western Kentucky | Houchens Industries–L. T. Smith Stadium • Bowling Green, KY | CBSSN | **WKU** 10-7 | - | |
| November 14 | 3:30 p.m. EST | **North Texas** | UAB | Legion Field • Birmingham, AL | Stadium | **POSTPONED** | NA | |
| November 14 | 3:30 p.m. EST | **Rice** | Louisiana Tech | Joe Aillet Stadium • Ruston, LA | ESPN3 | **POSTPONED** | NA | |
^{#}Rankings from AP Poll released prior to game.

==== Week Twelve ====
| Date | Time | Visiting team | Home team | Site | TV | Result | Attendance | Ref. |
|---|---|---|---|---|---|---|---|---|
| November 20 | 8:00 p.m. EST | UMass | **Florida Atlantic** | FAU Stadium • Boca Raton, FL | CBSSN | **W** 24-2 | 5,554 | |
| November 21 | 12:30 p.m. EST | **Charlotte** | **Marshall** | Joan C. Edwards Stadium • Huntington, WV | Stadium | **POSTPONED** | NA | |
| November 21 | 2:00 p.m. EST | **FIU** | **Western Kentucky** | Houchens Industries–L. T. Smith Stadium • Bowling Green, KY | | **WKU** 39-21 | - | |
| November 21 | 2:00 p.m. EST | **Rice** | **North Texas** | Apogee Stadium • Denton, TX | | **UNT** 27-17 | - | |
| November 21 | 3:00 p.m. EST | **UTSA** | **Southern Miss** | M.M. Roberts Stadium • Hattiesburg, MS | | **UTSA** 23-20 | - | |
| November 21 | 3:30 p.m. EST | **Middle Tennessee** | Troy | Veterans Memorial Stadium • Troy, AL | | **W** 20-17 | - | |
| November 21 | 4:00 p.m. EST | **UAB** | **UTEP** | Sun Bowl Stadium • El Paso, TX | | **CANCELED** | NA | |
| November 21 | 4:00 p.m. EST | Louisiana-Monroe | **Louisiana Tech** | Independence Stadium • Shreveport, LA | Stadium | **CANCELED** | NA | |
^{#}Rankings from AP Poll released prior to game.

==== Week Thirteen ====
| Date | Time | Visiting team | Home team | Site | TV | Result | Attendance | Ref. |
|---|---|---|---|---|---|---|---|---|
| November 27 | 12:30 p.m. EST | Southern Miss | UAB | Legion Field • Birmingham, AL | CBSSN | **CANCELLED** | NA | |
| November 28 | 12:00 p.m. EST | Louisiana Tech | FIU | Riccardo Silva Stadium • Miami, FL | ESPN+ | **POSTPONED** | NA | |
| November 28 | 1:00 p.m. EST | Rice | UTEP | Grande Communications Stadium • Midland, TX | ESPN3 | **CANCELLED** | NA | |
| November 28 | 3:00 p.m. EST | North Texas | UTSA | Alamodome • San Antonio, TX | Stadium | **UTSA** 49-17 | - | |
| November 28 | 3:30 p.m. EST | Florida Atlantic | Middle Tennessee | Johnny "Red" Floyd Stadium • Murfreesboro, TN | CBSSN | **POSTPONED** | NA | |
| December 1 | 10:30 a.m. EST | Western Kentucky | Charlotte | Jerry Richardson Stadium • Charlotte, NC | CBSSN | **POSTPONED** | NA | |
^{#}Rankings from AP Poll released prior to game.

==== Week Fourteen ====
| Date | Time | Visiting team | Home team | Site | TV | Result | Attendance | Ref. |
|---|---|---|---|---|---|---|---|---|
| December 3 | 6:00 p.m. EST | **Louisiana Tech** | **North Texas** | Apogee Stadium • Denton, TX | CBSSN | **LT** 42–31 | 6,085 | |
| December 4 | 8:00 p.m. EST | **Southern Miss** | **UTEP** | Sun Bowl Stadium • El Paso, TX | Stadium | **CANCELLED** | n/a | |
| December 5 | 12:00 p.m. EST | **Rice** | No. 15 **Marshall** | Joan C. Edwards Stadium • Huntington, WV | ESPN+ | **Rice** 20–0 | 10,429 | |
| December 5 | 6:00 p.m. EDT | **Florida Atlantic** | Georgia Southern | Allen E. Paulson Stadium • Statesboro, GA | ESPN+ | **L** 3-20 | 3,867 | |
| December 6 | 12:00 p.m. EST | **Western Kentucky** | **Charlotte** | Jerry Richardson Stadium • Charlotte, NC | ESPN3 | **WKU** 37–19 | 0 | |
^{#}Rankings from AP Poll released prior to game.

==== Week Fifteen ====
| Date | Time | Visiting team | Home team | Site | TV | Result | Attendance | Ref. |
|---|---|---|---|---|---|---|---|---|
| December 10 | 6:30 p.m. EST | **Florida Atlantic** | **Southern Miss** | M.M. Roberts Stadium • Hattiesburg, MS | CBSSN | **USM** 45-31 | 0 | |
| December 11 | 6:00 p.m. EST | **North Texas** | **UTEP** | Sun Bowl Stadium • El Paso, TX | ESPN3 | **UNT** 45-43 | 5,612 | |
| December 11 | 6:30 p.m. EST | **Charlotte** | **Marshall** | Joan C. Edwards Stadium • Huntington, WV | CBSSN | **CANCELLED** | NA | |
| December 12 | 1:00 p.m. EST | **UAB** | **Rice** | Rice Stadium • Houston, TX | ESPN3 | **UAB** 21-16 | 2,000 | |
| December 12 | 7:00 p.m. EST | **Louisiana Tech** | TCU | Amon G. Carter Stadium • Fort Worth, TX | FS1 | **L** 10-52 | 10,472 | |
^{#}Rankings from AP Poll released prior to game.

==== Conference USA Championship Game ====
| Date | Time | Visiting team | Home team | Site | TV | Result | Attendance | Ref. |
|---|---|---|---|---|---|---|---|---|
| December 18 | 7:00 p.m. EST | **UAB** | **Marshall** | Joan C. Edwards Stadium • Huntington, WV | CBSSN | **UAB** 22–13 | | |
^{#}Rankings from AP Poll released prior to game. All times are in Eastern Time.

== Postseason ==
=== Bowl games ===
Legend
| C-USA Win |
| C-USA Loss |

| Bowl game | Date | Site | Television | Time (EST) | C-USA team | Opponent | Score | Attendance |
|---|---|---|---|---|---|---|---|---|
| Myrtle Beach Bowl | December 21 | Brooks Stadium • Conway, SC | ESPN | 2:30 p.m. | North Texas | Appalachian State | **L** 28–56 | 5,000 |
| New Orleans Bowl | December 23 | Mercedes-Benz Superdome • New Orleans, LA | ESPN | 3:00 p.m. | Louisiana Tech | Georgia Southern | **L** 3–38 | 3,000 |
| Montgomery Bowl | December 23 | Cramton Bowl • Montgomery, AL | ESPN | 7:00 p.m. | Florida Atlantic | Memphis | **L** 10–25 | 2,979 |
| Camellia Bowl | December 25 | Cramton Bowl • Montgomery, AL | ESPN | 2:30 p.m. | Marshall | Buffalo | **L** 10–17 | 2,512 |
| First Responder Bowl | December 26 | Gerald J. Ford Stadium • Dallas, TX | ABC | 3:30 p.m. | UTSA | No. 19 Louisiana | **L** 24–31 | |
| LendingTree Bowl | December 26 | Ladd-Peebles Stadium • Mobile, AL | ESPN | 3:30 p.m. | Western Kentucky | Georgia State | **L** 21–39 | |

Rankings are from CFP rankings. All times Eastern Time Zone. C-USA teams shown in bold.

Note: UAB was originally slated to play in the Gasparilla Bowl on December 26. However, the bowl was cancelled after their opponent, South Carolina, was forced to withdraw due to COVID-19 issues among the team.

=== Selection of teams ===
- Bowl eligible:
- Bowl-ineligible:

== Awards and honors ==
=== Player of the week honors ===
| Week | Offensive | | | Defensive | | | Special Teams | | |
| Week | Player | Team | Position | Player | Team | Position | Player | Team | Position |
|---|---|---|---|---|---|---|---|---|---|
| Week 1 (Sept. 7) | Grant Wells | Marshall | QB | K.D. Davis | North Texas | LB | Matt Quinn | UAB | K |
| Week 2 (Sept. 14) | Sincere McCormick | UTSA | RB | Tyler Murray | Charlotte | LB | Hunter Duplessis | UTSA | K |
| Week 3 (Sept. 21) | Frank Harris | UTSA | QB | Tavante Beckett, | Marshall | LB | Jacob Barnes | Louisiana Tech | K |
| Week 4 (Sept. 28) | Luke Anthony | Louisiana Tech | QB | Jamal Ligon | UTSA | LB | Lexington Joseph | FIU | KR |
| Week 5 (Oct. 5) | Tyrrell Pigrome | Western Kentucky | QB | Leighton McCarthy | Florida Atlantic | LB | Brayden Narveson | Western Kentucky | K |
| Week 6 (Oct. 12) | Aaron McAllister | Charlotte | RB | Tavante Beckett (2) | Marshall | LB | Duron Lowe | UTEP | KR |
| Week 7 (Oct. 19) | Jason Bean | North Texas | QB | Eli Neal | Marshall | LB | Nikia Eason Jr. | UAB | OLB |
| Week 8 (Oct. 26) | Sincere McCormick (2) | UTSA | RB | Trey Baldwin, Antonio Parks | Louisiana Tech, UTSA | LB, S | Jalen Jackson | Middle Tennessee | CB |
| Week 9 (Nov. 2) | Aaron Allen | Louisiana Tech | QB | Bee Jay Williamson | Louisiana Tech | DB | Jacob Barnes (2) | Louisiana Tech | K |
| Week 10 (Nov. 9) | Grant Wells (2) | Marshall | QB | DeAngelo Malone | Western Kentucky | DL | Matt Hayball | Florida Atlantic | P |
| Week 11 (Nov. 16) | Grant Wells (3) | Marshall | QB | Rashad Wisdom | UTSA | S | Robert LeFevre | Marshall | P |
| Week 12 (Nov. 23) | Sincere McCormick (3) | UTSA | RB | Dion Novil | North Texas | DL | John Haggerty | Western Kentucky | P |
| Week 13 (Nov. 30) | | | | | | | | | |
| Week 14 (Dec. 7) | | | | | | | | | |
| Week 15 (Dec. 14) | | | | | | | | | |

=== C–USA Individual Awards ===
The following individuals received postseason honors as voted by the Conference USA football coaches at the end of the season

| Award | Player | School |
|---|---|---|
| Player of the Year | Jaelon Darden, WR, Sr. | North Texas |
| Offensive Player of the Year | Sincere McCormick, RB, So. | UTSA |
| Defensive Player of the Year | Tavante Beckett, LB, Sr. | Marshall |
| Special Teams Player of the Year | Lucas Dean, P, So. | UTSA |
| Freshman Player of the Year | Grant Wells, QB | Marshall |
| Newcomer of the Year | Luke Anthony, QB, Grad. | Louisiana Tech |
| Coach of the Year | Doc Holliday | Marshall |

=== All-conference teams ===
| Position | Player | Team |
|---|---|---|
First Team Offense
| WR | Jaelon Darden | North Texas |
| WR | Austin Trammell | Rice |
| WR | Austin Watkins, Jr. | UAB |
| OL | Kody Russey | Louisiana Tech |
| OL | Cain Madden | Marshall |
| OL | Josh Ball | Marshall |
| OL | Colby Ragland | UAB |
| OL | Sidney Wells | UAB |
| TE | Xavier Gaines | Marshall |
| QB | Grant Wells | Marshall |
| RB | Brenden Knox | Marshall |
| RB | Sincere McCormick | UTSA |
First Team Defense
| DT | Milton Williams | Louisiana Tech |
| DT | Dion Novil | North Texas |
| DE | Darius Hodge | Marshall |
| DE | Jordan Smith | UAB |
| DE | DeAngelo Malone | WKU |
| LB | Tavante Beckett | Marshall |
| LB | Blaze Alldregde | Rice |
| LB | Kristopher Moll | UAB |
| DB | BeeJay Williamson | Louisiana Tech |
| DB | Steven Gilmore | Marshall |
| DB | Gregory Grate, Jr. | Middle Tennessee |
| DB | Rashad Wisdom | UTSA |
First Team Special Teams
| K | Hunter Duplessis | UTSA |
| P | Lucas Dean | UTSA |
| KR | Wayne Toussant | Louisiana Tech |
| PR | Talik Keaton | Marshall |
| LS | Jacob Fuqua | UAB |

| Position | Player | Team |
|---|---|---|
Second Team Offense
| WR | Victor Tucker | Charlotte |
| WR | Adrian Hardy | Louisiana Tech |
| WR | Jacob Cowing | UTEP |
| OL | Alex Mollette | Marshall |
| OL | Jacob Brammer | North Texas |
| OL | Ahofitu Maka | UTSA |
| OL | Makai Hart | UTSA |
| OL | Spencer Burford | UTSA |
| OL | Jordan Meredith | WKU |
| TE | Jordan Myers | Rice |
| TE | Hayden Pittman | UAB |
| QB | Asher O'Hara | Middle Tennessee |
| RB | Spencer Brown | UAB |
| RB | Frank Gore Jr. | Southern Miss |
Second Team Defense
| DT | Jamare Edwards | Marshall |
| DT | Antonio Moultrie | UAB |
| DE | Leighton McCarthy | Florida Atlantic |
| DE | Praise Amaewhule | UTEP |
| LB | Trey Baldwin | Louisiana Tech |
| LB | Tyler Grubbs | Louisiana Tech |
| LB | Hayes Maples | Southern Miss |
| LB | Noah Wilder | UAB |
| DB | Nazeeh Johnson | Marshall |
| DB | Brontae Harris | UAB |
| DB | TD Marshall | UAB |
| DB | Devon Key | WKU |
| DB | Dionté Ruffin | WKU |
Second Team Special Teams
| K | Braydon Narveson | WKU |
| P | John Haggerty | WKU |
| KR | Lexington Joseph | FIU |
| PR | Smoke Harris | Louisiana Tech |
| LS | Reeves Blankenship | Louisiana Tech |

*Denotes Unanimous Selection

Ref:

All Conference Honorable Mentions:

Offense:

Defense:

Special Teams:

=== All-Americans ===
The 2020 College Football All-America Teams are composed of the following College Football All-American first teams chosen by the following selector organizations: Associated Press (AP), Football Writers Association of America (FWAA), American Football Coaches Association (AFCA), Walter Camp Foundation (WCFF), The Sporting News (TSN), Sports Illustrated (SI), USA Today (USAT) ESPN, CBS Sports (CBS), FOX Sports (FOX) College Football News (CFN), Bleacher Report (BR), Scout.com, Phil Steele (PS), SB Nation (SB), Athlon Sports, Pro Football Focus (PFF) and Yahoo! Sports (Yahoo!).

Currently, the NCAA compiles consensus all-America teams in the sports of Division I-FBS football and Division I men's basketball using a point system computed from All-America teams named by coaches associations or media sources. The system consists of three points for a first-team honor, two points for second-team honor, and one point for third-team honor. Honorable mention and fourth team or lower recognitions are not accorded any points. Football consensus teams are compiled by position and the player accumulating the most points at each position is named first team consensus all-American. Currently, the NCAA recognizes All-Americans selected by the AP, AFCA, FWAA, TSN, and the WCFF to determine Consensus and Unanimous All-Americans. Any player named to the First Team by all five of the NCAA-recognized selectors is deemed a Unanimous All-American.

| Position | Player | School | Selector | Unanimous | Consensus |
|---|---|---|---|---|---|
First Team All-Americans
| WR | Jaelon Darden | North Texas | ESPN, FWAA, USAT | | |
| OL | Cain Madden | Marshall | Athletic, USAT | | |

| Position | Player | School | Selector | Unanimous | Consensus |
|---|---|---|---|---|---|
Second Team All-Americans
| WR | Jaelon Darden | North Texas | AFCA, AP, CBS, TSN | | |
| OL | Cain Madden | Marshall | AP | | |
| RB | Sincere McCormick | UTSA | FWAA | | |
| LB | Tavante Beckett | Marshall | FWAA | | |
| P | Lucas Dean | UTSA | TSN | | |

| Position | Player | School | Selector | Unanimous | Consensus |
|---|---|---|---|---|---|
Third Team All-Americans

| Position | Player | School | Selector | Unanimous | Consensus |
|---|---|---|---|---|---|
Fourth Team All-Americans

== C-USA records vs Other Conferences ==
2020–2021 records against non-conference foes:

Regular season

| Power 5 Conferences | Record |
|---|---|
| ACC | 0–3 |
| Big Ten | 0–0 |
| Big 12 | 0–1 |
| BYU/Notre Dame | 0–3 |
| Pac-12 | 0–0 |
| SEC | 0–0 |
| Power 5 Total | 0–7 |
| Other FBS Conferences | Record |
| American | 0–2 |
| Independents (Excluding BYU and Notre Dame) | 2–4 |
| MAC | 0–0 |
| Mountain West | 0–0 |
| Sun Belt | 5–5 |
| Other FBS Total | 7–11 |
| FCS Opponents | Record |
| Football Championship Subdivision | 8–1 |
| Total Non-Conference Record | 15–19 |

Post Season

| Power Conferences 5 | Record |
|---|---|
| ACC | 0–0 |
| Big Ten | 0–0 |
| Big 12 | 0–0 |
| BYU/Notre Dame | 0-0 |
| Pac-12 | 0–0 |
| SEC | 0–0 |
| Power 5 Total | 0–0 |
| Other FBS Conferences | Record |
| American | 0–0 |
| Independents (Excluding Notre Dame) | 0–0 |
| MAC | 0–0 |
| Mountain West | 0–0 |
| Sun Belt | 0-0 |
| Other FBS Total | 0–0 |
| Total Bowl Record | 0–0 |

=== C-USA vs Power Five matchups ===
This is a list of games the Sun Belt has scheduled versus power conference teams (ACC, Big 10, Big 12, Pac-12, BYU/Notre Dame and SEC). All rankings are from the current AP Poll at the time of the game.

| Date | Conference | Visitor | Home | Site | Score |
|---|---|---|---|---|---|
| September 10 | ACC | UAB | Miami, FL | Hard Rock Stadium • Miami, FL | L 14–31 |
| September 12 | Big 12 | UTEP | No. 14 Texas | Darrell K Royal - Texas Memorial Stadium • Austin, TX | L 3–59 |
| September 12 | ACC | Western Kentucky | Louisville | Cardinal Stadium • Louisville, KY | L 21–35 |
| October 2 | Independents | Louisiana Tech | No. 22 BYU | LaVell Edwards Stadium • Provo, UT | L 14–45 |
| October 9 | Independents | UTSA | No. 15 BYU | LaVell Edwards Stadium • Provo, UT | L 20–27 |
| October 31 | ACC | Charlotte | Duke | Wallace Wade Stadium • Durham, NC | L 19–53 |
| October 31 | Independents | Western Kentucky | No. 11 BYU | LaVell Edwards Stadium • Provo, UT | L 10–41 |

=== C-USA vs Group of Five matchups ===
The following games include C-USA teams competing against teams from the American, MAC, Mountain West or Sun Belt.

| Date | Conference | Visitor | Home | Site | Score |
|---|---|---|---|---|---|
| September 3 | Sun Belt | South Alabama | Southern Miss | M.M. Roberts Stadium • Hattiesburg, MS | L 21-32 |
| September 12 | Sun Belt | Charlotte | App State | Kidd Brewer Stadium • Boone, NC | L 20-35 |
| September 12 | Sun Belt | UTSA | Texas State | Bobcats Stadium • San Marcos, TX | W 51-48 2OT |
| September 19 | Sun Belt | Troy | Middle Tennessee | Johnny "Red" Floyd Stadium • Murfreesboro, TN | L 20-35 |
| September 19 | Sun Belt | No. 23 App State | Marshall | Joan C. Edwards Stadium • Huntington, WV | W 17-7 |
| September 19 | American | SMU | North Texas | Apogee Stadium • Denton, TX | L 35-65 |
| September 24 | Sun Belt | UAB | South Alabama | Hancock Whitney Stadium • Mobile, AL | W 42-10 |
| September 26 | American | Tulane | Southern Miss | M.M. Roberts Stadium • Hattiesburg, MS | L 24-66 |
| September 26 | Sun Belt | UTEP | Louisiana-Monroe | Malone Stadium • Monroe, LA | W 24-10 |
| October 23 | Sun Belt | Louisiana | UAB | Legion Field • Birmingham, AL | L 20-24 |
| November 21 | Sun Belt | Middle Tennessee | Troy | Veterans Memorial Stadium • Troy, AL | W 20-17 |
| December 7 | Sun Belt | Florida Atlantic | Georgia Southern | Allen E. Paulson Stadium • Statesboro, GA | L 3-20 |

=== C-USA vs FBS independents matchups ===
The following games include C-USA teams competing against FBS Independents, which includes Army, Liberty, New Mexico State, or UMass.

| Date | Conference | Visitor | Home | Site | Score |
|---|---|---|---|---|---|
| September 5 | Independents | Middle Tennessee | Army | Michie Stadium • West Point, NY | L 0-42 |
| September 19 | Independents | Liberty | Western Kentucky | Houchens Industries–L. T. Smith Stadium • Bowling Green, KY | L 24-30 |
| September 26 | Independents | FIU | Liberty | Williams Stadium • Lynchburg, VA | L 34-36 |
| September 5 | Independents | Army | UTSA | Alamodome • San Antonio, TX | L 16-28 |
| November 7 | Independents | UMass | Marshall | Joan C. Edwards Stadium• Huntington, WV | W 51-10 |
| November 20 | Independents | UMass | Florida Atlantic | FAU Stadium • Boca Raton, FL | W 24-2 |

=== C–USA vs FCS matchups ===
| Date | Visitor | Home | Site | Score |
|---|---|---|---|---|
| September 3 | Central Arkansas | UAB | Legion Field • Birmingham, AL | W 45-35 |
| September 5 | Eastern Kentucky | Marshall | Joan C. Edwards Stadium • Huntington, WV | W 59-0 |
| September 5 | Houston Baptist | North Texas | Apogee Stadium • Denton, TX | W 57-31 |
| September 5 | Stepen F. Austin | UTEP | Sun Bowl Stadium • El Paso, TX | W 24-14 |
| September 19 | Abilene Christian | UTEP | Sun Bowl Stadium • El Paso, TX | W 17-13 |
| September 26 | Houston Baptist | Louisiana Tech | Joe Aillet Stadium • Ruston, LA | W 66-38 |
| October 23 | Jacksonville State | FIU | Riccardo Silva Stadium • Miami, FL | L 10-19 |
| October 24 | Chattanooga | Western Kentucky | Houchens Industries–L. T. Smith Stadium • Bowling Green, KY | W 13-10 |
| November 7 | North Alabama | Southern Miss | M.M. Roberts Stadium • Hattiesburg, MS | W 24-13 |

== NFL draft ==
The following list includes all C-USA players who were drafted in the 2021 NFL draft.

| Player | Position | School | Draft Round | Round Pick | Overall Pick | Team |
|---|---|---|---|---|---|---|
| Milton Williams | DT | Louisiana Tech | 3 | 9 | 73 | Philadelphia Eagles |
| Jordan Smith | OLB | UAB | 4 | 16 | 121 | Jacksonville Jaguars |
| Jaelon Darden | WR | North Texas | 4 | 24 | 129 | Tampa Bay Buccaneers |
| Josh Ball | OT | Marshall | 4 | 33 | 138 | Dallas Cowboys |
