= 2019 Conference USA football season =

2019 Conference USA Football season
- League: NCAA Division I Football Bowl Subdivision
- Sport: Football
- Duration: August 29, 2019 to January 2020
- Teams: 14

2020 NFL Draft
- Top draft pick: OLB Alex Highsmith, Charlotte
- Picked by: Pittsburgh Steelers, 102nd overall

Regular season
- East champions: FAU Owls
- East runners-up: Marshall Thundering Herd
- West champions: UAB Blazers
- West runners-up: Louisiana Tech Bulldogs

Conference USA Championship Game
- Champions: Florida Atlantic
- Runners-up: UAB
- Finals MVP: Deangelo Antoine, Florida Atlantic

Seasons
- ← 2018 2020 →

2019 Conference USA football standings
| | Conf. | | | Overall |
| Team | W | | L | W | | L |
|---|---|---|---|---|---|---|
East Division
| Florida Atlantic xy$ | 7 | – | 1 | 11 | – | 3 |
| Marshall | 6 | – | 2 | 8 | – | 5 |
| Western Kentucky | 6 | – | 2 | 9 | – | 4 |
| Charlotte | 5 | – | 3 | 7 | – | 6 |
| Middle Tennessee | 3 | – | 5 | 4 | – | 8 |
| FIU | 3 | – | 5 | 6 | – | 7 |
| Old Dominion | 0 | – | 8 | 1 | – | 11 |
West Division
| UAB xy | 6 | – | 2 | 9 | – | 5 |
| Louisiana Tech x | 6 | – | 2 | 10 | – | 3 |
| Southern Miss | 5 | – | 3 | 7 | – | 6 |
| North Texas | 3 | – | 5 | 4 | – | 8 |
| UTSA | 3 | – | 5 | 4 | – | 8 |
| Rice | 3 | – | 5 | 3 | – | 9 |
| UTEP | 0 | – | 8 | 1 | – | 11 |
Championship: Florida Atlantic 49, UAB 6
$ – Conference champion; x – Division champion/co-champions; y – Championship game participant

The 2019 Conference USA football season was the 24th season of College Football play for Conference USA (C-USA). It was played from August 29, 2019, until January 2020. Conference USA consisted of 14 members in two division as a part of the 2019 NCAA Division I FBS football season.

The conference consisted of 14 members. The Conference USA Football Championship game was played on December 7.

== Preseason ==
=== Preseason Awards ===
The conference preseason awards were released On July 15.

- Preseason Offensive Player of the Year: Mason Fine, Senior, QB, North Texas
- Preseason Defensive Player of the Year: Sage Lewis Sr, Senior, LB, FIU
- Preseason Special Teams Player of the Year: Jonathan Cruz, Sophomore, Kicker, Charlotte

Offense
| Position | Player | Class | Team |
|---|---|---|---|
| QB | Mason Fine | Senior | North Texas |
| RB | Spencer Brown | Junior | UAB |
| RB | Benny LeMay | Senior | Charlotte |
| OL | Levi Brown | Senior | Marshall |
| OL | Josh Dunlap | Senior | UTSA |
| OL | Derron Gatewood | Senior | UTEP |
| OL | Sosaia Mose | Senior | North Texas |
| OL | Miles Pate | Senior | WKU |
| TE | Harrison Bryant | Senior | Florida Atlantic |
| WR | Rico Bussey Jr. | Senior | North Texas |
| WR | Adrian Hardy | Junior | Louisiana Tech |
| WR | Quez Watkins | Junior | Southern Miss |

Defense
| Position | Player | Class | Team |
|---|---|---|---|
| DL | Channing Hames | Senior | Marshall |
| DL | LaDarius Hamilton | Senior | North Texas |
| DL | Alex Highsmith | Senior | Charlotte |
| DL | Garrett Marino | Senior | UAB |
| DL | DeMarrio Smith | Senior | Southern Miss |
| DL | Jacques Turner | Junior | Southern Miss |
| LB | Khalil Brooks | Senior | Middle Tennessee |
| LB | Sage Lewis | Senior | FIU |
| LB | Racheem Boothe | Junior | Southern Miss |
| DB | Reed Blankenship | Junior | Middle Tennessee |
| DB | Ky'el Hemby | Junior | Southern Miss |
| DB | Amik Robertson | Junior | Louisiana Tech |
| DB | Chris Jackson | Senior | Marshall |

Specialists
| Position | Player | Class | Team |
|---|---|---|---|
| K | Jonathan Cruz | Sophomore | Charlotte |
| P | Alvin Kenworthy | Senior | North Texas |
| KR | Brett Winnegan | Senior | UTSA |
| PR | Maurice Alexander | Senior | FIU |
| LS | Matt Beardall | Senior | Marshall |

=== Media predictions ===
The 2019 preseason media football poll was released on July 16.

East Division
1. Marshall (14 First place votes)
2. FIU (9)
3. Florida Atlantic
4. Middle Tennessee
5. WKU
6. Old Dominion
7. Charlotte
West Division
1. North Texas (20)
2. Southern Miss (4)
3. Louisiana Tech
4. UAB (2)
5. UTSA
6. Rice
7. UTEP

== Head coaches ==
Note: All stats shown are before beginning of the season

| Team | Head coach | Years at school | Overall record | Record at school | CUSA Record |
|---|---|---|---|---|---|
| Charlotte | Will Healy | 1 | 20–26 | 7–5 | 5–3 |
| FIU | Butch Davis | 3 | 80–52 | 17–9 | 11–5 |
| Florida Atlantic | Lane Kiffin | 3 | 51–31 | 16–10 | 28–17 |
| Louisiana Tech | Skip Holtz | 7 | 134–104 | 46–33 | 64–45 |
| Marshall | Doc Holliday | 10 | 70–46 | 70–46 | 45–27 |
| Middle Tennessee | Rick Stockstill | 14 | 87–78 | 87–78 | 65–36 |
| North Texas | Seth Littrell | 4 | 23–17 | 23–17 | 15–9 |
| Old Dominion | Bobby Wilder | 11 | 76–45 | 76–45 | 32–24 |
| Rice | Mike Bloomgren | 2 | 2–12 | 2–12 | 1–7 |
| Southern Miss | Jay Hopson | 4 | 55–33 | 21–16 | 15–9 |
| UAB | Bill Clark | 4 | 36–18 | 25–14 | 17–7 |
| UTEP | Dana Dimel | 2 | 31–50 | 1–11 | 1–7 |
| UTSA | Frank Wilson | 4 | 15–21 | 15–21 | 10–14 |
| Western Kentucky | Mike Sanford Jr. | 3 | 9–16 | 9–16 | 6–10 |

== Rankings ==
| | | Pre | Wk 2 | Wk 3 | Wk 4 | Wk 5 | Wk 6 | Wk 7 | Wk 8 | Wk 9 | Wk 10 | Wk 11 | Wk 12 | Wk 13 | Wk 14 | Wk 15 | Final |
|---|---|---|---|---|---|---|---|---|---|---|---|---|---|---|---|---|---|
| Charlotte | AP | | | | | | | | | | | | | | | | |
| Charlotte | C | | | | | | | | | | | | | | | | |
| Charlotte | CFP | Not released | | | | | | | | | | | | | | | |
| FIU | AP | | | | | | | | | | | | | | | | |
| FIU | C | | | | | | | | | | | | | | | | |
| FIU | CFP | Not released | | | | | | | | | | | | | | | |
| Florida Atlantic | AP | | | | | | | | | | | | | | | RV | |
| Florida Atlantic | C | | | | | | | | | | | | | | | RV | |
| Florida Atlantic | CFP | Not released | | | | | | | | | | | | | | | |
| Louisiana Tech | AP | | | | | | | | RV | RV | RV | RV | RV | | | | |
| Louisiana Tech | C | | | | | | | | RV | RV | RV | RV | RV | RV | | | |
| Louisiana Tech | CFP | Not released | | | | | | | | | | | | | | | |
| Marshall | AP | | | | | | | | | | | | | | | | |
| Marshall | C | | | | | | | | | | | | | | | | |
| Marshall | CFP | Not released | | | | | | | | | | | | | | | |
| Middle Tennessee | AP | | | | | | | | | | | | | | | | |
| Middle Tennessee | C | | | | | | | | | | | | | | | | |
| Middle Tennessee | CFP | Not released | | | | | | | | | | | | | | | |
| North Texas | AP | | | | | | | | | | | | | | | | |
| North Texas | C | | | | | | | | | | | | | | | | |
| North Texas | CFP | Not released | | | | | | | | | | | | | | | |
| Old Dominion | AP | | | | | | | | | | | | | | | | |
| Old Dominion | C | | | | | | | | | | | | | | | | |
| Old Dominion | CFP | Not released | | | | | | | | | | | | | | | |
| Rice | AP | | | | | | | | | | | | | | | | |
| Rice | C | | | | | | | | | | | | | | | | |
| Rice | CFP | Not released | | | | | | | | | | | | | | | |
| Southern Miss | AP | | | | | | | | | | | | | | | | |
| Southern Miss | C | | | | | | | | | | | | | | | | |
| Southern Miss | CFP | Not released | | | | | | | | | | | | | | | |
| UAB | AP | RV | | | | | | | | | | | | | | | |
| UAB | C | | | | | | | | | RV | RV | | | | | | |
| UAB | CFP | Not released | | | | | | | | | | | | | | | |
| UTEP | AP | | | | | | | | | | | | | | | | |
| UTEP | C | | | | | | | | | | | | | | | | |
| UTEP | CFP | Not released | | | | | | | | | | | | | | | |
| UTSA | AP | | | | | | | | | | | | | | | | |
| UTSA | C | | | | | | | | | | | | | | | | |
| UTSA | CFP | Not released | | | | | | | | | | | | | | | |
| WKU | AP | | | | | | | | | | | | | | | | |
| WKU | C | | | | | | | | | | | | | | | | |
| WKU | CFP | Not released | | | | | | | | | | | | | | | |

Legend
| | Improvement in ranking |
| | Drop in ranking |
| | Not ranked previous week |
| | No change in ranking from previous week |
| RV | Received votes but were not ranked in Top 25 of poll |
| т | Tied with team above or below also with this symbol |

== Schedule ==
=== Regular season ===
Index to colors and formatting
C–USA member won
C–USA member lost
C–USA teams in **bold**

==== Week One ====
| Date | Time | Visiting team | Home team | Site | TV | Result | Attendance | Ref. |
|---|---|---|---|---|---|---|---|---|
| August 29 | 7:30 p.m. EST | Central Arkansas | **Western Kentucky** | L.T. Smith Stadium • Bowling Green, KY | ESPN+ | **L** 28–35 | 17,120 | |
| August 29 | 8:00 p.m. EST | **FIU** | Tulane | Yulman Stadium • New Orleans, LA | ESPN3 | **L** 14–42 | 16,361 | |
| August 29 | 8:00 p.m. EST | Alabama State | **UAB** | Legion Field • Birmingham, AL | ESPN+ | **W** 24–19 | 39,165 | |
| August 29 | 8:30 p.m. EST | Gardner-Webb | **Charlotte** | McColl-Richardson Field • Charlotte, NC | ESPN+ | **W** 49–28 | 16,119 | |
| August 30 | 7:00 p.m. EST | **Rice** | Army | Michie Stadium • West Point, NY | CBSSN | **L** 7–14 | 23,238 | |
| August 31 | 12:00 p.m. EST | **Florida Atlantic** | No. 5 Ohio State | Ohio Stadium • Columbus, OH | FOX | **L** 21–45 | 103,228 | |
| August 31 | 6:00 p.m. EST | Incarnate Word | **UTSA** | Alamodome • San Antonio, TX | ESPN3 | **W** 35–7 | 26,787 | |
| August 31 | 6:30 p.m. EST | VMI | **Marshall** | Joan C. Edwards Stadium • Huntington, WV | Stadium | **W** 56–17 | 23,875 | |
| August 31 | 7:00 p.m. EST | Alcorn State | **Southern Miss** | Roberts Stadium • Hattiesburg, MS | ESPN+ | **W** 38–10 | 31,076 | |
| August 31 | 7:00 p.m. EST | Norfolk State | **Old Dominion** | S.B. Ballard Stadium • Norfolk, VA | ESPN3 | **W** 24–21 | 21,944 | |
| August 31 | 7:00 p.m. EST | Houston Baptist | **UTEP** | Sun Bowl Stadium • El Paso, TX | ESPN+ | **W** 36–34 | 34,646 | |
| August 31 | 7:30 p.m. EST | **Middle Tennessee** | No. 7 Michigan | Michigan Stadium • Ann Arbor, MI | BTN | **L** 21–40 | 110,811 | |
| August 31 | 7:30 p.m. EST | Abilene Christian | **North Texas** | Apogee Stadium • Denton, TX | ESPN+ | **W** 31-51 | 23,057 | |
| August 31 | 8:00 p.m. EST | **Louisiana Tech** | No. 10 Texas | Texas Memorial Stadium • Austin, TX | LHN | **L** 14–45 | 93,418 | |
^{#}Rankings from AP Poll released prior to game.

==== Week Two ====
| Date | Time | Visiting team | Home team | Site | TV | Result | Attendance | Ref. |
|---|---|---|---|---|---|---|---|---|
| September 6 | 8:00 p.m. EST | Wake Forest | **Rice** | Rice Stadium • Houston, TX | CBSSN | **L** 21–41 | 17,567 | |
| September 6 | 9:00 p.m. EST | **Marshall** | No. 24 Boise State | Albertsons Stadium • Boise, ID | ESPN2 | **L** 7–14 | 31,951 | |
| September 7 | 12:00 p.m. EST | **Old Dominion** | Virginia Tech | Lane Stadium • Blacksburg, VA | ESPNU | **L** 17–31 | 57,282 | |
| September 7 | 12:00 p.m. EST | **UAB** | Akron | InfoCision Stadium • Akron, OH | CBSSN | **W** 31–0 | 18,972 | |
| September 7 | 3:30 p.m. EST | Grambling State | **Louisiana Tech** | Joe Aillet Stadium • Ruston, LA | NFLN | **W** 20–14 | 23,174 | |
| September 7 | 3:30 p.m. EST | **Southern Miss** | Mississippi State | Davis Wade Stadium • Starkville, MS | ESPNU | **L** 38–15 | 55,143 | |
| September 7 | 3:30 p.m. EST | **Charlotte** | Appalachian State | Kidd Brewer Stadium • Boone, NC | ESPN+ | **L** 41–56 | 29,182 | |
| September 7 | 4:00 p.m. EST | **UTSA** | Baylor | McLane Stadium • Waco, TX | FSN | **L** 14–63 | 40,274 | |
| September 7 | 7:00 p.m. EST | No. 18 UCF | **FAU** | FAU Stadium • Boca Raton, FL | CBSSN | **L** 14–48 | 30,811 | |
| September 7 | 7:00 p.m. EST | **Western Kentucky** | **FIU** | Riccardo Silva Stadium • Miami, FL | ESPN+ | **WKU** 20–14 | 13,311 | |
| September 7 | 7:00 p.m. EST | Tennessee State | **Middle Tennessee** | Johnny "Red" Floyd Stadium • Murfreesboro, TN | ESPN3 | **W** 45–26 | 20,912 | |
| September 7 | 7:30 p.m. EST | **North Texas** | SMU | Gerald J. Ford Stadium • Dallas, TX (Safeway Bowl) | ESPN3 | **L** 27–49 | 22,766 | |
| September 7 | 8:00 p.m. EST | **UTEP** | Texas Tech | Jones AT&T Stadium • Lubbock, TX | FSN | **L** 3–38 | 56,957 | |
^{#}Rankings from AP Poll released prior to game. All times are in Eastern Time Zone.

==== Week Three ====
| Date | Time | Visiting team | Home team | Site | TV | Result | Attendance | Ref. |
|---|---|---|---|---|---|---|---|---|
| September 14 | 2:00 p.m. EST | **Florida Atlantic** | Ball State | Scheumann Stadium • Muncie, IN | ESPN+ | **W** 41–31 | 14,333 | |
| September 14 | 3:15 p.m. EST | **North Texas** | California | Memorial Stadium • Berkeley, CA | P12N | **L** 17–23 | 35,268 | |
| September 14 | 3:30 p.m. EST | Army | **UTSA** | Alamodome • San Antonio, TX | NFLN | **L** 13–31 | 30,718 | |
| September 14 | 4:00 p.m. EST | Louisville | **Western Kentucky** | Nissan Stadium • Nashville, TN | Stadium | **L** 21–38 | 22,665 | |
| September 14 | 5:00 p.m. EST | **Louisiana Tech** | Bowling Green | Doyt Perry Stadium • Bowling Green, OH | ESPN+ | **W** 35–7 | 18,021 | |
| September 14 | 6:00 p.m. EST | **Southern Miss** | Troy | Veterans Memorial Stadium • Troy, AL | ESPN+ | **W** 47–42 | 27,108 | |
| September 14 | 6:00 p.m. EST | Massachusetts | **Charlotte** | Jerry Richardson Stadium • Charlotte, NC | ESPN3 | **W** 52–17 | 12,812 | |
| September 14 | 6:30 p.m. EST | Ohio | **Marshall** | Joan C. Edwards Stadium • Huntington, WV | ESPN+ | **W** 33–31 | 27,323 | |
| September 14 | 7:00 p.m. EST | New Hampshire | **FIU** | Riccardo Silva Stadium • Miami, FL | ESPN3 | **W** 30–17 | 11,756 | |
| September 14 | 7:00 p.m. EST | Duke | **Middle Tennessee** | Johnny "Red" Floyd Stadium • Murfreesboro, TN | Stadium, Facebook Live | **L** 18–41 | 19,852 | |
| September 14 | 8:00 p.m. EST | No. 12 Texas | **Rice** | Rice Stadium • Houston, TX | CBSSN | **L** 13–48 | 42,417 | |
^{#}Rankings from AP Poll released prior to game. All times are in Eastern Time Zone.

==== Week Four ====
| Date | Time | Visiting team | Home team | Site | TV | Result | Attendance | Ref. |
|---|---|---|---|---|---|---|---|---|
| September 20 | 8:00 p.m. EST | **FIU** | **Louisiana Tech** | Joe Aillet Stadium • Ruston, LA | CBSSN | **LT** 43–31 | 18,782 | |
| September 21 | 12:00 p.m. EST | **Southern Miss** | No. 2 Alabama | Bryant–Denny Stadium • Tuscaloosa, AL | ESPN2 | **L** 7–49 | 101,821 | |
| September 21 | 3:30 p.m. EST | South Alabama | **UAB** | Legion Field • Birmingham, AL | NFLN | **W** 35–3 | 27,932 | |
| September 21 | 6:00 p.m. EST | Wagner | **Florida Atlantic** | FAU Stadium • Boca Raton, FL | ESPN+ | **W** 42–7 | 14,210 | |
| September 21 | 7:00 p.m. EST | Baylor | **Rice** | Rice Stadium • Houston, TX | CBSSN | **L** 13–21 | 20,198 | |
| September 21 | 7:00 p.m. EST | **Old Dominion** | No. 21 Virginia | Scott Stadium • Charlottesville, VA | ESPN2 | **L** 17–28 | 44,573 | |
| September 21 | 7:30 p.m. EST | **Charlotte** | No. 1 Clemson | Memorial Stadium • Clemson, SC | ACCN | **L** 10–52 | 81,500 | |
| September 21 | 7:30 p.m. EST | **UTSA** | **North Texas** | Apogee Stadium • Denton, TX | TBA | UNT 45–3 | 19,922 | |
| September 21 | 8:00 p.m. EST | Nevada | **UTEP** | Sun Bowl • El Paso, TX | ESPN3 | **L** 21–37 | 10,493 | |
^{#}Rankings from AP Poll released prior to game. All times are in Eastern Time Zone.

==== Week Five ====
| Date | Time | Visiting team | Home team | Site | TV | Result | Attendance | Ref. |
|---|---|---|---|---|---|---|---|---|
| September 28 | 12:00 p.m. EST | **Middle Tennessee** | No. 14 Iowa | Kinnick Stadium • Iowa City, IA | ESPN2 | **L** 3–48 | 63,706 | |
| September 28 | 3:30 p.m. EST | **FAU** | **Charlotte** | Jerry Richardson Stadium • Charlotte, NC | NFLN | **FAU** 45–27 | 12,334 | |
| September 28 | 5:00 p.m. EST | Cincinnati | **Marshall** | Joan C. Edwards Stadium • Huntington, WV | ESPN2 | **L** 14–52 | 32,192 | |
| September 28 | 6:00 p.m. EST | East Carolina | **Old Dominion** | S.B. Ballard Stadium • Norfolk, VA | ESPN+ | **L** 21–24 | 18,643 | |
| September 28 | 7:00 p.m. EST | **UTEP** | **Southern Miss** | M.M. Roberts Stadium • Hattiesburg, MS | ESPN+ | **USM** 31–13 | 23,337 | |
| September 28 | 7:00 p.m. EST | **UAB** | **Western Kentucky** | L.T. Smith Stadium • Bowling Green, KY | ESPN+ | **WKU** 20–13 | 20,304 | |
| September 28 | 7:00 p.m. EST | **Louisiana Tech** | **Rice** | Rice Stadium • Houston, TX | ESPN3 | **LT** 23–20 | 19,075 | |
| September 28 | 8:00 p.m. EST | Houston | **North Texas** | Apogee Stadium • Denton, TX | CBSSN Facebook | **L** 25–46 | 30,123 | |
^{#}Rankings from AP Poll released prior to game. All times are in Eastern Time Zone.

==== Week Six ====
| Date | Time | Visiting team | Home team | Site | TV | Result | Attendance | Ref. |
|---|---|---|---|---|---|---|---|---|
| October 5 | 3:30 p.m. EST | **Marshall** | **Middle Tennessee** | Johnny "Red" Floyd Stadium • Murfreesboro, TN | Facebook | **MTSU** 24–13 | 15,023 | |
| October 5 | 6:00 p.m. EST | **Western Kentucky** | **Old Dominion** | S.B. Ballard Stadium • Norfolk, VA | ESPN+ | **WKU** 20–3 | 18,405 | |
| October 5 | 7:00 p.m. EST | UMass | **FIU** | Riccardo Silva Stadium • Miami, FL | ESPN3 | **W** 44–0 | 12,746 | |
| October 5 | 7:00 p.m. EST | **Rice** | **UAB** | Legion Field • Birmingham, AL | ESPN+ | **UAB** 35–20 | 23,526 | |
| October 5 | 8:00 p.m. EST | **UTSA** | **UTEP** | Sun Bowl • El Paso, TX | ESPN+ | **UTSA** 26–16 | 13,876 | |
^{#}Rankings from AP Poll released prior to game. All times are in Eastern Time Zone.

==== Week Seven ====
| Date | Time | Visiting team | Home team | Site | TV | Result | Attendance | Ref. |
|---|---|---|---|---|---|---|---|---|
| October 12 | 2:30 p.m. EST | **Old Dominion** | Marshall | Joan C. Edwards Stadium • Huntington, WV | ESPN+ | **MU** 31–17 | 18,351 | |
| October 12 | 4:00 p.m. EST | **Middle Tennessee** | Florida Atlantic | FAU Stadium • Boca Raton, FL | ESPN+ | **FAU** 28–13 | 12,107 | |
| October 12 | 6:00 p.m. EST | **UAB** | UTSA | Alamodome • San Antonio, TX | ESPN+ | **UAB** 33–14 | 15,728 | |
| October 12 | 7:00 p.m. EST | Army | Western Kentucky | L.T. Smith Stadium • Bowling Green, KY | ESPN+ | **W** 17–8 | 16,107 | |
| October 12 | 7:00 p.m. EST | UMass | Louisiana Tech | Joe Aillet Stadium • Ruston, LA | ESPN3 | **W** 69–21 | 19,682 | |
| October 12 | 7:00 p.m. EST | **North Texas** | Southern Miss | M.M. Roberts Stadium • Hattiesburg, MS | Facebook | **USM** 45–27 | 25,225 | |
| October 12 | 7:00 p.m. EST | **Charlotte** | FIU | Riccardo Silva Stadium • Miami, FL | ESPN+ | **FIU** 48–23 | 16,834 | |
^{#}Rankings from AP Poll released prior to game. All times are in Eastern Time Zone.

==== Week Eight ====
| Date | Time | Visiting team | Home team | Site | TV | Result | Attendance | Ref. |
|---|---|---|---|---|---|---|---|---|
| October 18 | 6:30 p.m. EST | Marshall | Florida Atlantic | FAU Stadium • Boca Raton, FL | CBSSN | **MU** 36–31 | 15,138 | |
| October 19 | 3:30 p.m. EST | Southern Miss | Louisiana Tech | Joe Aillet Stadium • Ruston, LA | NFLN | **LT** 45–30 | 23,419 | |
| October 19 | 4:00 p.m. EST | Old Dominion | UAB | Legion Field • Birmingham, AL | ESPN+ | **UAB** 38–14 | 19,511 | |
| October 19 | 4:00 p.m. EST | Middle Tennessee | North Texas | Apogee Stadium • Denton, TX | TBA | **UNT** 33–30 | 16,094 | |
| October 19 | 4:00 p.m. EST | Charlotte | Western Kentucky | L. T. Smith Stadium • Bowling Green, KY | ESPN+ | **WKU** 30–14 | 15,816 | |
| October 19 | 6:00 p.m. EST | Rice | UTSA | Alamodome • San Antonio, TX | ESPN3 | **UTSA** 31–27 | 17,657 | |
| October 19 | 7:00 p.m. EST | UTEP | FIU | Riccardo Silva Stadium • Miami, FL | ESPN+ | **FIU** 32-17 | 13,951 | |
^{#}Rankings from AP Poll released prior to game. All times are in Eastern Time Zone.

==== Week Nine ====
| Date | Time | Visiting team | Home team | Site | TV | Result | Attendance | Ref. |
|---|---|---|---|---|---|---|---|---|
| October 26 | 1:00 p.m. EST | Southern Miss | Rice | Rice Stadium • Houston, TX | ESPN+ | **USM** 20–6 | 20,367 | |
| October 26 | 2:30 p.m. EST | Western Kentucky | Marshall | Joan C. Edwards Stadium • Huntington, WV | Stadium on Facebook | **MU** 26–23 | 22,099 | |
| October 26 | 3:30 p.m. EST | North Texas | Charlotte | Jerry Richardson Stadium • Charlotte, NC | ESPN+ | **CHAR** 39–38 | 8,245 | |
| October 26 | 3:30 p.m. EST | FIU | Middle Tennessee | Johnny "Red" Floyd Stadium • Murfreesboro, TN | NFLN | **MTSU** 50–17 | 9,512 | |
| October 26 | 3:30 p.m. EST | Florida Atlantic | Old Dominion | S.B. Ballard Stadium • Norfolk, VA | ESPN+ | **FAU** 41–3 | 17,744 | |
| October 26 | 8:00 p.m. EST | Louisiana Tech | UTEP | Sun Bowl • El Paso, TX | ESPN3 | **LT** 42–21 | 16,084 | |
^{#}Rankings from AP Poll released prior to game. All times are in Eastern Time Zone.

==== Week Ten ====
| Date | Time | Visiting team | Home team | Site | TV | Result | Attendance | Ref. |
|---|---|---|---|---|---|---|---|---|
| November 2 | 12:00 p.m. EST | UTSA | Texas A&M | Kyle Field • College Station, TX | SECN | **L** 10–45 | 100,635 | |
| November 2 | 12:00 p.m. EST | Old Dominion | **FIU** | Riccardo Silva Stadium • Miami, FL | ESPN+ | **FIU** 24–17 | 19,243 | |
| November 2 | 3:30 p.m. EST | Middle Tennessee | **Charlotte** | Jerry Richardson Stadium • Charlotte, NC | ESPN3 | **CHAR** 34–20 | 13,879 | |
| November 2 | 3:30 p.m. EST | Marshall | **Rice** | Rice Stadium • Houston, TX | Facebook | **MU** 20–7 | 17,385 | |
| November 2 | 3:30 p.m. EST | UTEP | **North Texas** | Apogee Stadium • Denton, TX | NFLN | **UNT** 52–26 | 22,548 | |
| November 2 | 4:00 p.m. EST | Florida Atlantic | **Western Kentucky** | L.T. Smith Stadium • Bowling Green, KY | ESPN+ | **FAU** 35–24 | 14,212 | |
| November 2 | 7:00 p.m. EST | UAB | Tennessee | Neyland Stadium • Knoxville, TN | ESPNU | **L** 7–30 | 85,791 | |
^{#}Rankings from AP Poll released prior to game. All times are in Eastern Time Zone.

==== Week Eleven ====
| Date | Time | Visiting team | Home team | Site | TV | Result | Attendance | Ref. |
|---|---|---|---|---|---|---|---|---|
| November 9 | 12:00 p.m. EST | Western Kentucky | Arkansas | Donald W. Reynolds Razorback Stadium • Fayetteville, AR | SECN | **W** 45–19 | 42,985 | |
| November 9 | 2:00 p.m. EST | UTSA | **Old Dominion** | S.B. Ballard Stadium • Norfolk, VA | ESPN3 | **UTSA** 24–23 | 16,297 | |
| November 9 | 3:00 p.m. EST | Charlotte | **UTEP** | Sun Bowl • El Paso, TX | ESPN+ | **CHAR** 28–21 | 15,683 | |
| November 9 | 3:30 p.m. EST | UAB | **Southern Miss** | M.M. Roberts Stadium • Hattiesburg, MS | NFLN | **USM** 37–2 | 23,819 | |
| November 9 | 4:00 p.m. EST | North Texas | **Louisiana Tech** | Joe Aillet Stadium • Ruston, LA | Facebook | **LT** 52–17 | 22,792 | |
| November 9 | 6:00 p.m. EST | FIU | **Florida Atlantic** | FAU Stadium • Boca Raton, FL | Stadium | **FAU** 37–7 | 17,603 | |
^{#}Rankings from AP Poll released prior to game. All times are in Eastern Time Zone.

==== Week Twelve ====
| Date | Time | Visiting team | Home team | Site | TV | Result | Attendance | Ref. |
|---|---|---|---|---|---|---|---|---|
| November 15 | 7:00 p.m. | **Louisiana Tech** | **Marshall** | Joan C. Edwards Stadium • Huntington, WV | CBSSN | **MU** 31–10 | 19,893 | |
| November 16 | 1:00 p.m. | **UTEP** | **UAB** | Legion Field • Birmingham, AL | ESPN3 | **UAB** 37–10 | 19,875 | |
| November 16 | 4:30 p.m. | **Rice** | **Middle Tennessee** | Johnny "Red" Floyd Stadium • Murfreesboro, TN | ESPN+ | **RICE** 31–28 | 10,411 | |
| November 16 | 6:00 p.m. | **Southern Miss** | **UTSA** | Alamodome • San Antonio, TX | ESPN+ | **USM** 36–17 | 14,179 | |
^{#}Rankings from AP Poll released prior to game. All times are in Eastern Time Zone.

==== Week Thirteen ====
| Date | Time | Visiting team | Home team | Site | TV | Result | Attendance | Ref. |
|---|---|---|---|---|---|---|---|---|
| November 23 | 3:30 p.m. EST | **Louisiana Tech** | **UAB** | Legion Field • Birmingham, AL | ESPN+ | **UAB** 20–14 | 18,346 | |
| November 23 | 3:30 p.m. EST | **Marshall** | **Charlotte** | Jerry Richardson Stadium • Charlotte, NC | Stadium | **CHAR** 24–13 | 10,526 | |
| November 23 | 3:30 p.m. EST | **North Texas** | **Rice** | Rice Stadium • Houston, TX | NFLN | **RICE** 20-14 | 18,477 | |
| November 23 | 3:30 p.m. EST | **Western Kentucky** | **Southern Miss** | M.M. Roberts Stadium • Hattiesburg, MS | ESPN+ | **WKU** 28–10 | 20,369 | |
| November 23 | 4:00 p.m. EST | **UTEP** | New Mexico State | Aggie Memorial Stadium • Las Cruces, NM | TBA | **L** 44–35 | 21,584 | |
| November 23 | 4:30 p.m. EST | **Old Dominion** | **Middle Tennessee** | Johnny "Red" Floyd Stadium • Murfreesboro, TN | ESPN3 | **MTSU** 38–17 | 9,806 | |
| November 23 | 6:00 p.m. EST | **Florida Atlantic** | **UTSA** | Alamodome • San Antonio, TX | ESPN+ | **FAU** 40–26 | 14,355 | |
| November 23 | 7:00 p.m. EST | Miami | **FIU** | Riccardo Silva Stadium • Miami, FL | CBSSN | **W** 30–24 | 27,339 | |
^{#}Rankings from AP Poll released prior to game. All times are in Eastern Time Zone.

==== Week Fourteen ====
| Date | Time | Visiting team | Home team | Site | TV | Result | Attendance | Ref. |
|---|---|---|---|---|---|---|---|---|
| November 30 | 12:00 p.m. EST | FIU | Marshall | Joan C. Edwards Stadium • Huntington, WV | CBSSN | **MU** 30-27 | 18,596 | |
| November 30 | 2:00 p.m. EST | Middle Tennessee | Western Kentucky | L.T. Smith Stadium • Bowling Green, KY | ESPN+ | **WKU** 31-26 | 7,589 | |
| November 30 | 2:00 p.m. EST | Charlotte | Old Dominion | S.B. Ballard Stadium • Norfolk, VA | ESPN+ | **CHAR** 38-22 | 16,369 | |
| November 30 | 3:00 p.m. EST | Rice | UTEP | Sun Bowl • El Paso, TX | ESPN3 | **RICE** 30-16 | 11,776 | |
| November 30 | 3:30 p.m. EST | Southern Miss | Florida Atlantic | FAU Stadium • Boca Raton, FL | NFLN | **FAU** 34-17 | 13,414 | |
| November 30 | 3:30 p.m. EST | UTSA | Louisiana Tech | Joe Aillet Stadium • Ruston, LA | ESPN+ | **LT** 41-27 | 14,782 | |
| November 30 | 4:00 p.m. EST | UAB | North Texas | Apogee Stadium • Denton, TX | ESPN+ | **UAB** 26-21 | 16,406 | |
^{#}Rankings from AP Poll released prior to game. All times are in Eastern Time Zone.

==== Conference USA Championship Game ====
| Date | Time | Visiting team | Home team | Site | TV | Result | Attendance | Ref. |
|---|---|---|---|---|---|---|---|---|
| December 7 | 1:30 p.m. | **UAB** | **Florida Atlantic** | FAU Stadium • Boca Raton, FL | CBSSN | **FAU** 49–6 | 14,387 | |
^{#}Rankings from AP Poll released prior to game. All times are in Eastern Time.

== Postseason ==
=== Bowl games ===
Legend
| C-USA Win |
| C-USA Loss |

| Bowl game | Date | Site | Television | Time (CST) | C-USA team | Opponent | Score | Attendance |
|---|---|---|---|---|---|---|---|---|
| Bahamas Bowl | December 20 | Thomas Robinson Stadium • Nassau, Bahamas | ESPN | 1:00 p.m. | Charlotte | Buffalo | 9–31 | 13,547 |
| Boca Raton Bowl | December 21 | FAU Stadium • Boca Raton, Florida | ABC | 2:30 p.m. | Florida Atlantic | SMU | 52–28 | 23,187 |
| Camellia Bowl | December 21 | Cramton Bowl • Montgomery, Alabama | ESPN | 4:30 p.m. | FIU | Arkansas St. | 26–34 | 16,209 |
| New Orleans Bowl | December 21 | Mercedes-Benz Superdome • New Orleans, Louisiana | ESPN | 8:00 p.m. | UAB | Appalachian St. | 17–31 | 21,202 |
| Gasparilla Bowl | December 23 | Raymond James Stadium • Tampa, Florida | ESPN | 1:30 p.m. | Marshall | UCF | 25–48 | 28,987 |
| Independence Bowl | December 26 | Independence Stadium • Shreveport, Louisiana | ESPN | 3:00 p.m. | Louisiana Tech | Miami, FL | 14–0 | 33,129 |
| First Responder Bowl | December 30 | Gerald J. Ford Stadium • University Park, Texas | ESPN | 11:30 a.m. | WKU | WMU | 23–20 | 13,164 |
| Armed Forces Bowl | January 4 | Amon G. Carter Stadium • Fort Worth, Texas | ESPN | 10:30 a.m. | Southern Miss | Tulane | 13–30 | 38,513 |

Rankings are from CFP rankings. All times Central Time Zone. C-USA teams shown in bold.

=== Selection of teams ===
- Bowl eligible: Florida Atlantic, Marshall, Western Kentucky, Charlotte, Florida International, UAB, Louisiana Tech, Southern Mississippi
- Bowl-ineligible: Middle Tennessee, Old Dominion, Rice, North Texas, UTSA, UTEP

== Awards and honors ==
=== Player of the week honors ===
| Week | Offensive | | | Defensive | | | Special Teams | | |
| Week | Player | Team | Position | Player | Team | Position | Player | Team | Position |
|---|---|---|---|---|---|---|---|---|---|
| Week 1 (Sept. 2) | Jason Pirtle | North Texas | TE | Garrett Marino | UAB | DL | Jaylond Adams | Southern Miss | WR/KR/PR |
| Week 2 (Sept. 9) | Tyler Johnston III | UAB | QB | Reed Blankenship | Middle Tennessee | S | Cory Munson | Western Kentucky | PK |
| Week 3 (Sept. 16) | Quez Watkins | Southern Miss | WR | Rashad Smith | Florida Atlantic | LB | Jaylond Adams (2) | Southern Miss | WR/KR/PR |
| Week 4 (Sept. 23) | Deangelo Antoine | Florida Atlantic | WR | Keion White | Old Dominion | DE | Bailey Hale | Louisiana Tech | PK |
| Week 5 (Sept. 30) | Jack Abraham | Southern Miss | QB | Kyle Bailey | Western Kentucky | LB | Cory Munson (2) | Western Kentucky | PK |
| Week 6 (Oct. 7) | Sincere McCormick | UTSA | RB | Jovante Moffatt | Middle Tennessee | S | Maurice Alexander | FIU | WR/PR |
| Week 7 (Oct. 14) | Jack Abraham (2) | Southern Miss | QB | Darius Hodge | Marshall | DL | Nick Vogel | UAB | PK |
| Week 8 (Oct. 21) | Brenden Knox | UAB | RB | Amik Robertson | Louisiana Tech | CB | Ethan Mooney | North Texas | PK |
| Week 9 (Oct. 28) | Chris Reynolds | Charlotte | QB | Kearon Merrell | Marshall | CB | Justin Rohrwasser | Marshall | PK |
| Week 10 (Nov. 4) | Mason Fine | North Texas | QB | Akileis Leroy | Florida Atlantic | LB | Duron Lowe | UTEP | KR |
| Week 11 (Nov. 11) | Ty Storey | Western Kentucky | QB | Devon Key | Western Kentucky | S | Andrew Stein | Southern Miss | PK |
| Week 12 (Nov. 18) | Brad Rozner | Rice | WR | Tavante Beckett | Marshall | LB | Zac Everett | Southern Miss | P |
| Week 13 (Nov. 25) | Victor Tucker | Charlotte | WR | Deangelo Malone | Western Kentucky | DE | José Borregales | FIU | PK |
| Week 14 (Dec. 1) | J'Mar Smith | Louisiana Tech | QB | Alex Highsmith | Charlotte | DE | Robert LeFevre | Marshall | P |

=== C–USA Individual Awards ===
The following individuals received postseason honors as voted by the Conference USA football coaches at the end of the season

| Award | Player | School |
|---|---|---|
| Player of the Year | Brenden Knox, RB, RS So. | Marshall |
| Offensive Player of the Year | J'Mar Smith, QB, RS Sr. | Louisiana Tech |
| Defensive Player of the Year | DeAngelo Malone, DL Jr. | Western Kentucky |
| Special Teams Player of the Year | Justin Rohrwasser, P/K Jr. | Marshall |
| Freshman Player of the Year | Sincere McCormick, RB | UTSA |
| Newcomer of the Year | Ty Storey, QB Jr. | Western Kentucky |
| Coach of the Year | Tyson Helton | Western Kentucky |

=== All-conference teams ===
| Position | Player | Team |
|---|---|---|
First Team Offense
| WR | Jaelon Darden | North Texas |
| WR | Quez Watkins | Southern Miss |
| WR | Lucky Jackson | WKU |
| OL | Cameron Clark | Charlotte |
| OL | Junior Diaz | Florida Atlantic |
| OL | Brandon Walton | Florida Atlantic |
| OL | Levi Brown | Marshall |
| OL | Miles Pate | WKU |
| TE | Harrison Bryant | Florida Atlantic |
| QB | Chris Robinson | Florida Atlantic |
| QB | J'Mar Smith | Louisiana Tech |
| RB | Benny LeMay | Charlotte |
| RB | Brenden Knox | Marshall |
First Team Defense
| DT | Channing Hames | Marshall |
| DT | Garrett Marino | UAB |
| DE | Alex Highsmith | Charlotte |
| DE | DeAngelo Malone | WKU |
| LB | Tavante Beckett | Marshall |
| LB | Blaze Alldredge | Rice |
| DB | Kristopher Moll | UAB |
| DB | Amik Robertson | Louisiana Tech |
| DB | Chris Jackson | Marshall |
| DB | D.Q. Thomas | Southern Miss |
First Team Special Teams
| K | Justin Rohrwasser | Marshall |
| P | John Haggerty | WKU |
| KR | Jaylord Adams | Southern Miss |
| PR | Talik Keaton | Marshall |
| LS | Matt Beardall | Marshall |

| Position | Player | Team |
|---|---|---|
Second Team Offense
| WR | Tim Jones | Southern Miss |
| WR | Austin Watkins Jr. | Louisiana Tech |
| WR | Jahcour Pearson | WKU |
| OL | Ethan Reed | Louisiana Tech |
| OL | Cain Madden | Marshall |
| OL | Drake Dorbeck | Southern Miss |
| OL | Elex Woodworth | North Texas |
| OL | Darren Gatewood | UTEP |
| TE | Armani Levias | Marshall |
| QB | Mason Fine | North Texas |
| RB | Justin Henderson | Louisiana Tech |
| RB | Gaej Walker | WKU |
Second Team Defense
| DT | Courtney Wallace | Louisiana Tech |
| DT | Demarrio Smith | Southern Miss |
| DT | Denzel Chukwukelu | UTEP |
| DE | Keion White | Old Dominion |
| DE | Jordan Smith | UAB |
| LB | Sage Lewis | FIU |
| LB | Akileis Leroy | Florida Atlantic |
| LB | Omari Cobb | Marshall |
| LB | Lawrence Garner | Old Dominion |
| DB | Stantley Thomas-Oliver | FIU |
| DB | L'Jarius Sneed | Louisiana Tech |
| DB | Reed Blankenship | Middle Tennessee |
| DB | Kaleb Ford-Dement | Old Dominion |
Second Team Special Teams
| K | Bailey Hale | Louisiana Tech |
| P | Chris Barnes | Rice |
| KR | Deion Hair-Griffin | North Texas |
| PR | Jaylond Adams | Southern Miss |
| LS | Reeves Blankenship | Louisiana Tech |
| LS | Jared Nash | WKU |

*Denotes Unanimous Selection

Ref:

All Conference Honorable Mentions:

Offense: QB – Chris Reynolds, R-So., Charlotte • QB – James Morgan, Gr., FIU • QB – Jack Abraham, R-Jr., Southern Miss • RB – Anthony Jones, R-Sr., FIU • RB – Tre Siggers, R-So., North Texas • RB – De’Michael Harris Sr., Southern Miss • RB – Sincere McCormick, Fr., UTSA • OL – D’Ante Demery Jr., FIU • OL – Devontay Taylor, R-Jr., FIU • OL – Desmond Noel, R-Jr., Florida Atlantic • OL – Willie Allen, R-Jr., Louisiana Tech • OL – Drew Kirkpatrick, R-Sr., Louisiana Tech • OL – Kody Russey, R-Jr., Louisiana Tech • OL – Gewhite Stallworth, R-Sr., Louisiana Tech • OL – Will Gilchrist Jr., Middle Tennessee • OL – Robert Jones Jr., Middle Tennessee • OL – Isaac Weaver Jr., Old Dominion • OL – Shea Baker, R-So., Rice • OL – Brian Chaffin, Gr., Rice • OL – Justin Gooseberry, Gr., Rice • OL – Nick Leverett, Gr., Rice • OL – Arvin Fletcher, R-Jr., Southern Miss • OL – Colby Ragland, R-Jr., UAB • OL – Sidney Wells Jr., UAB • OL – Bobby DeHaro, R-So., UTEP • OL – Spencer Burford, So., UTSA • OL – Josh Dunlop Sr., UTSA • OL – Jordan Meredith, R-Jr., WKU • TE – John Raine Sr., Florida Atlantic • TE – Jason Pirtle, R-Jr., North Texas • TE – Carlos Strickland II Jr., UTSA • TE – Joshua Simon, Fr., WKU • WR – Victor Tucker, R-So., Charlotte • WR – Tony Gaiter IV Sr., FIU • WR – Deangelo Antoine Sr., Florida Atlantic • WR – Adrian Hardy, R-Jr., Louisiana Tech • WR – Malik Stanley, R-Sr., Louisiana Tech • WR – Jyaire Shorter, Fr., North Texas • WR – Brad Rozner Jr., Rice • WR – Austin Trammell, Jr., Rice • WR – Myron Mitchell, R-Jr., UAB

Defense: DT – Ray Ellis, Gr., Florida Atlantic • DT – Milton Williams, R-So., Louisiana Tech • DT – Dion Novil Jr., North Texas • DT – Myles Adams Sr., Rice • DT – Delmond Landry, R-Sr., Southern Miss • DT – Tony Fair, R-Jr., UAB • DT – Jaylon Haynes Jr., UTSA • DT – Jeremy Darvin, R-Jr., WKU • DT – Jaylon George, R-Sr., WKU • DE – Markees Watts, So., Charlotte • DE – Tim Bonner, R-Sr., Florida Atlantic • DE – Willie Baker, R-Jr., Louisiana Tech • DE – Darius Hodge, R-So., Marshall • DE – LaDarius Hamilton Sr., North Texas • DE – Derek Wilder Sr., Old Dominion • DE – Jacques Turner, R-Jr., Southern Miss • DE – Fitzgerald Mofor, R-Sr., UAB • DE – Eric Banks Sr., UTSA • DE – Jarrod Carter-McLin Sr., UTSA • LB – Jeff Gemmell, R-Sr., Charlotte • LB – Rashad Smith Sr., Florida Atlantic • LB – Collin Scott, R-Sr., Louisiana Tech • LB – Connor Taylor Sr., Louisiana Tech • LB – KD Davis, So., North Texas • LB – Tyreke Davis Jr., North Texas • LB – Racheem Boothe, R-Jr., Southern Miss • LB – Swayze Bozeman, Jr., Southern Miss • LB – Kyle Bailey Jr., WKU • DB – Nafees Lyon, R-Sr., Charlotte • DB – Zyon Gilbert Jr., Florida Atlantic • DB – James Pierre Jr., Florida Atlantic • DB – Chris Tooley Sr., Florida Atlantic • DB – Michael Sam, R-Sr., Louisiana Tech • DB – Nazeeh Johnson, R- Jr., Marshall • DB – Jovante Moffatt Sr., Middle Tennessee • DB – Treshawn Chamberlain, So., Rice • DB – Ky’el Hemby, R-Jr., Southern Miss • DB – Rachuan Mitchell, R-Jr., Southern Miss • DB – Will Boler, R-So., UAB • DB – TD Marshall, R-Jr., UAB • DB – Dy’Jonn Turner Jr., UAB • DB – Michael Lewis, R-Sr., UTEP • DB – Ta’Corian Darden, R-Sr., WKU • DB – Devon Key, R-Jr., WKU • DB – Antwon Kincade Jr., WKU • DB – Trae Meadows, R-Jr., WKU

Special Teams: K – Ethan Mooney, So., North Texas • K – Andrew Stein, Fr., Southern Miss • K – Nick Vogel, R-Sr., UAB • K – Gavin Baechle, So., UTEP • P – Tommy Heatherly Jr., FIU • P – Alvin Kenworthy, R-Sr., North Texas • KR – Deangelo Antoine, Gr., Florida Atlantic • KR – Blake Watson, R-Fr., Old Dominion • KR – Myron Mitchell, R-Jr., UAB • KR – Duron Lowe, R-Jr., UTEP • PR – Darrell Brown Sr., Old Dominion • PR – Justin Garrett, R-Jr., UTEP • LS – Jonathan Sullivan Jr., Florida Atlantic • LS – Nate Durham Jr., North Texas • LS – Campbell Riddle, So., Rice • LS – T.J. Harvey, R-Fr., Southern Miss • LS – Jacob Fuqua, R-Jr., UAB

=== All-Americans ===
The 2019 College Football All-America Teams are composed of the following College Football All-American first teams chosen by the following selector organizations: Associated Press (AP), Football Writers Association of America (FWAA), American Football Coaches Association (AFCA), Walter Camp Foundation (WCFF), The Sporting News (TSN), Sports Illustrated (SI), USA Today (USAT) ESPN, CBS Sports (CBS), FOX Sports (FOX) College Football News (CFN), Bleacher Report (BR), Scout.com, Phil Steele (PS), SB Nation (SB), Athlon Sports, Pro Football Focus (PFF) and Yahoo! Sports (Yahoo!).

Currently, the NCAA compiles consensus all-America teams in the sports of Division I-FBS football and Division I men's basketball using a point system computed from All-America teams named by coaches associations or media sources. The system consists of three points for a first-team honor, two points for second-team honor, and one point for third-team honor. Honorable mention and fourth team or lower recognitions are not accorded any points. Football consensus teams are compiled by position and the player accumulating the most points at each position is named first team consensus all-American. Currently, the NCAA recognizes All-Americans selected by the AP, AFCA, FWAA, TSN, and the WCFF to determine Consensus and Unanimous All-Americans. Any player named to the First Team by all five of the NCAA-recognized selectors is deemed a Unanimous All-American.

| Position | Player | School | Selector | Unanimous | Consensus |
|---|---|---|---|---|---|
First Team All-Americans
| TE | Harrison Bryant | Florida Atlantic | AFCA, AP, FWAA, TSN, WCFF | ✓ | ✓ |
| DB | Amik Robertson | Louisiana Tech | FWAA | | |

| Position | Player | School | Selector | Unanimous | Consensus |
|---|---|---|---|---|---|
Second Team All-Americans
| DB | Amik Robertson | Louisiana Tech | AP, TSN | | |
| DE | Alex Highsmith | Charlotte | SI | | |

| Position | Player | School | Selector | Unanimous | Consensus |
|---|---|---|---|---|---|
Third Team All-Americans
| DE | Alex Highsmith | Charlotte | AP, PFF | | |

| Position | Player | School | Selector | Unanimous | Consensus |
|---|---|---|---|---|---|
Fourth Team All-Americans

*AFCA All-America Team (AFCA)
*Walter Camp Football Foundation All-America Team (WCFF)
*Associated Press All-America Team (AP)
*The Sporting News All-America Team (TSN)
*Football Writers Association of America All-America Team (FWAA)
*Sports Illustrated All-America Team (SI)
*Bleacher Report All-America Team (BR)
*College Football News All-America Team (CFN)
*ESPN All-America Team (ESPN)
*CBS Sports All-America Team (CBS)
*Athlon Sports All-America Team (Athlon)

=== National award winners ===
John Mackey Award (Outstanding Tight End)
Harrison Bryant, Florida Atlantic

== C-USA records vs Other Conferences ==
2019–2020 records against non-conference foes:

Regular season

| Power 5 Conferences | Record |
|---|---|
| ACC | 1–6 |
| Big Ten | 0–3 |
| Big 12 | 0–5 |
| BYU/Notre Dame | 0–0 |
| Pac-12 | 0–1 |
| SEC | 1–4 |
| Power 5 Total | 2–19 |
| Other FBS Conferences | Record |
| American | 0–6 |
| Independents (Excluding BYU and Notre Dame) | 4–2 |
| MAC | 4–0 |
| Mountain West | 0–2 |
| Sun Belt | 1–2 |
| Other FBS Total | 9–12 |
| FCS Opponents | Record |
| Football Championship Subdivision | 12–1 |
| Total Non-Conference Record | 21–32 |

Post Season

| Power Conferences 5 | Record |
|---|---|
| ACC | 0–0 |
| Big Ten | 0–0 |
| Big 12 | 0–0 |
| BYU/Notre Dame | 0-0 |
| Pac-12 | 0–0 |
| SEC | 0–0 |
| Power 5 Total | 0–0 |
| Other FBS Conferences | Record |
| American | 0–0 |
| Independents (Excluding Notre Dame) | 0–0 |
| MAC | 0–0 |
| Mountain West | 0–0 |
| Sun Belt | 0-0 |
| Other FBS Total | 0–0 |
| Total Bowl Record | 0–0 |

=== C-USA vs Power Five matchups ===
This is a list of games the Sun Belt has scheduled versus power conference teams (ACC, Big 10, Big 12, Pac-12, BYU/Notre Dame and SEC). All rankings are from the current AP Poll at the time of the game.

| Date | Conference | Visitor | Home | Site | Score |
|---|---|---|---|---|---|
| August 31 | Big 12 | Louisiana Tech | No. 10 Texas | Darrell K Royal–Texas Memorial Stadium • Austin, TX | L 14–45 |
| August 31 | Big Ten | Florida Atlantic | No. 5 Ohio State | Ohio Stadium • Columbus, OH | L 21–45 |
| August 31 | Big Ten | Middle Tennessee | No. 7 Michigan | Michigan Stadium • Ann Arbor, MI | L 21–40 |
| September 7 | ACC | Old Dominion | Virginia Tech | Lane Stadium • Blacksburg, VA | L 17–31 |
| September 7 | Big 12 | UTSA | Baylor | McLane Stadium • Waco, TX | L 14–63 |
| September 7 | Big 12 | UTEP | Texas Tech | Jones AT&T Stadium • Lubbock, TX | L 3–38 |
| September 7 | ACC | Wake Forest | Rice | Rice Stadium • Houston, TX | L 10–14 |
| September 7 | SEC | Southern Miss | Mississippi State | Davis Wade Stadium • Starkville, MS | L 15–38 |
| September 14 | ACC | Duke | Middle Tennessee | Floyd Stadium • Murfreesboro, TN | L 18–41 |
| September 14 | ACC | Louisville | Western Kentucky | Nissan Stadium • Nashville, TN | L 21–38 |
| September 14 | Big 12 | Texas | Rice | Rice Stadium • Houston, TX | L 13–48 |
| September 14 | Pac-12 | North Texas | California | California Memorial Stadium • Berkeley, CA | L 17–23 |
| September 21 | ACC | Charlotte | No. 1 Clemson | Memorial Stadium • Clemson, SC | L 10–52 |
| September 21 | ACC | Old Dominion | No. 21 Virginia | Scott Stadium • Charlottesville, VA | L 17–28 |
| September 21 | Big 12 | Baylor | Rice | Rice Stadium • Houston, TX | L 13–21 |
| September 21 | SEC | Southern Miss | No. 2 Alabama | Bryant–Denny Stadium • Tuscaloosa, AL | L 7–49 |
| September 28 | Big Ten | Middle Tennessee | No. 14 Iowa | Kinnick Stadium • Iowa City, IA | L 3–48 |
| November 2 | SEC | UAB | Tennessee | Neyland Stadium • Knoxville, TN | L 7–30 |
| November 2 | SEC | UTSA | Texas A&M | Kyle Field • College Station, TX | L 14–45 |
| November 9 | SEC | Western Kentucky | Arkansas | Donald W. Reynolds Razorback Stadium • Fayetteville, AR | W 45–19 |
| November 23 | ACC | Miami | FIU | Riccardo Silva Stadium • Miami, FL | W 30–24 |

=== C-USA vs Group of Five matchups ===
The following games include C-USA teams competing against teams from the American, MAC, Mountain West or Sun Belt.

| Date | Conference | Visitor | Home | Site | Score |
|---|---|---|---|---|---|
| August 29 | American | FIU | Tulane | Yulman Stadium • New Orleans, LA | L 14–42 |
| September 6 | Mountain West | Marshall | No. 24 Boise State | Albertsons Stadium • Boise, ID | L 7–14 |
| September 7 | Sun Belt | Charlotte | Appalachian State | Kidd Brewer Stadium • Boone, NC | L 41–56 |
| September 7 | MAC | UAB | Akron | InfoCision Stadium • Akron, OH | W 31–23 |
| September 7 | American | No. 17 UCF | Florida Atlantic | FAU Stadium • Boca Raton, FL | L 14–48 |
| September 7 | American | North Texas | SMU | Gerald J. Ford Stadium • Dallas, TX | L 27–49 |
| September 14 | Sun Belt | Southern Miss | Troy | Veterans Memorial Stadium • Troy, AL | W 47–42 |
| September 14 | MAC | Florida Atlantic | Ball State | Scheumann Stadium • Muncie, IN | W 41–31 |
| September 14 | MAC | Ohio | Marshall | Joan C. Edwards Stadium • Huntington, WV | W 33–31 |
| September 14 | MAC | Louisiana Tech | Bowling Green | Doyt Perry Stadium • Bowling Green, OH | W 35–7 |
| September 21 | Sun Belt | South Alabama | UAB | Legion Field • Birmingham, AL | W 35–3 |
| September 21 | Mountain West | Nevada | UTEP | Sun Bowl • El Paso, TX | L 21–37 |
| September 28 | American | Cincinnati | Marshall | Joan C. Edwards Stadium • Huntington, VA | L 14–52 |
| September 28 | American | East Carolina | Old Dominion | S.B. Ballard Stadium • Norfolk, VA | L 21–24 |
| September 28 | American | Houston | North Texas | Apogee Stadium • Denton, TX | L 25–46 |

=== C-USA vs FBS independents matchups ===
The following games include C-USA teams competing against FBS Independents, which includes Army, Liberty, New Mexico State, or UMass.

| Date | Conference | Visitor | Home | Site | Score |
|---|---|---|---|---|---|
| August 30 | Independents | Rice | Army | Michie Stadium • West Point, NY | L 7–14 |
| September 14 | Independents | UMass | Charlotte | McColl-Richardson Field • Charlotte, NC | W 52–17 |
| September 14 | Independents | Army | UTSA | Alamodome • San Antonio, TX | L 13–31 |
| October 5 | Independents | UMass | FIU | Riccardo Silva Stadium • Miami, FL | W 44–0 |
| October 12 | Independents | UMass | Louisiana Tech | Joe Aillet Stadium • Ruston, LA | W 69–21 |
| October 12 | Independents | Army | Western Kentucky | L.T. Smith Stadium • Bowling Green, KY | W 17–8 |
| November 23 | Independents | UTEP | New Mexico State | Aggie Memorial Stadium • Las Cruces, NM | L 35–44 |

=== C–USA vs FCS matchups ===
| Date | Visitor | Home | Site | Score |
|---|---|---|---|---|
| August 29 | Central Arkansas | Western Kentucky | L.T. Smith Stadium • Bowling Green, KY | L 28-35 |
| August 29 | Gardner–Webb | Charlotte | McColl-Richardson Field • Charlotte, NC | W 49–28 |
| August 29 | Alabama State | UAB | Legion Field • Birmingham, AL | W 24–19 |
| August 31 | Incarnate Word | UTSA | Alamodome • San Antonio, TX | W 35–7 |
| August 31 | VMI | Marshall | Joan C. Edwards Stadium • Huntington, WV | W 56–17 |
| August 31 | Norfolk State | Old Dominion | S.B. Ballard Stadium • Norfolk, VA | W 24–21 |
| August 31 | Alcorn State | Southern Miss | M.M. Roberts Stadium • Hattiesburg, MS | W 38–10 |
| August 31 | Abilene Christian | North Texas | Apogee Stadium • Denton, TX | W 51–31 |
| August 31 | Houston Baptist | UTEP | Sun Bowl • El Paso, TX | W 36–34 |
| September 7 | Grambling State | Louisiana Tech | Joe Aillet Stadium • Ruston, LA | W 20–14 |
| September 7 | Tennessee State | Middle Tennessee | Floyd Stadium • Murfreesboro, TN | W 45–26 |
| September 14 | New Hampshire | FIU | Riccardo Silva Stadium • Miami, FL | W 30–17 |
| September 21 | Wagner | Florida Atlantic | FAU Stadium • Boca Raton, FL | W 42–7 |

== Home game Attendance ==
| Team | Stadium | Capacity | Game1 | Game2 | Game3 | Game4 | Game5 | Game6 | Game7 | Total | Average | % of Capacity |
|---|---|---|---|---|---|---|---|---|---|---|---|---|
| Charlotte | Jerry Richardson Stadium | 15,314 | **16,119** † | 12,812 | 12,334 | 8,245 | 13,879 | 10,526 | | 73,915 | 12,319 | 80.4% |
| FIU | Riccardo Silva Stadium | 20,000 | 13,311 | 11,756 | 12,746 | 16,834 | 13,951 | **27,339** † | | 95,937 | 15,990 | 80.0% |
| Florida Atlantic | FAU Stadium | 29,419 | **30,811** † | 14,210 | 12,107 | 15,138 | 17,603 | 13,414 | 14,387 | 117,670 | 16,810 | 57.1% |
| Louisiana Tech | Joe Aillet Stadium | 28,562 | 23,174 | 18,782 | 19,682 | 23,419 † | 22,792 | 14,782 | | 122,631 | 20,439 | 71.6% |
| Marshall | Joan C. Edwards Stadium | 38,227 | 23,875 | 27,323 | 32,192 † | 18,351 | 22,099 | 18,596 | | 142,436 | 23,739 | 62.1% |
| Middle Tennessee | Johnny "Red" Floyd Stadium | 30,788 | 20,912 † | 19,852 | 15,023 | 9,512 | 10,411 | 9,805 | | 65,299 | 14,253 | 46.3% |
| North Texas | Apogee Stadium | 30,850 | 23,057 | 19,922 | 30,123 † | 16,094 | 22,548 | 16,406 | | 128,150 | 21,358 | 69.2% |
| Old Dominion | Foreman Field | 20,118 | **21,944** † | 18,643 | 18,405 | 17,744 | 16,297 | 16,369 | | 109,402 | 18,234 | 90.6% |
| Rice | Rice Stadium | 47,000 | 17,567 | 42,417 † | 20,198 | 19,075 | 20,367 | 18,477 | | 138,101 | 23,017 | 49.0% |
| Southern Miss | M.M. Roberts Stadium | 36,000 | 31,076 † | 23,337 | 25,225 | 23,819 | 20,396 | | | 123,853 | 24,771 | 68.8% |
| UAB | Legion Field | 71,594 | 39,165 † | 27,932 | 23,526 | 19,511 | 19,875 | 18,346 | | 148,355 | 24,726 | 34.5% |
| UTEP | Sun Bowl Stadium | 51,500 | 34,646 † | 10,493 | 13,876 | 16,084 | 15,683 | 11,776 | | 102,556 | 17,093 | 33.2% |
| UTSA | Alamodome | 65,000 | 26,787 | 30,718 † | 15,728 | 17,657 | 14,179 | 14,335 | | 119,404 | 19,901 | 30.6% |
| WKU | Houchens Industries–L. T. Smith Stadium | 22,113 | 17,120 | 22,665 (Note: This game was hosted at a neutral site, Nissan Stadium, but WKU was the designated home team, so the attendance is counted towards season totals.) | 20,304 † | 16,107 | 15,816 | 14,212 | 7,589 | 99,601 | 14,229 | 70.1% |

Bold – Exceed capacity
†Season High

== NFL draft ==
The following list includes all C-USA players who were drafted in the 2020 NFL draft.

| Round # | Pick # | NFL team | Player | Position | College |
|---|---|---|---|---|---|
| 3 | 102 | Pittsburgh Steelers | Alex Highsmith | OLB | Charlotte |
| 4 | 115 | Cleveland Browns | Harrison Bryant | TE | Florida Atlantic |
| 4 | 125 | New York Jets | James Morgan | QB | FIU |
| 4 | 129 | New York Jets | Cameron Clark | OT | Charlotte |
| 4 | 138 | Kansas City Chiefs | L'Jarius Sneed | S | Louisiana Tech |
| 4 | 139 | Las Vegas Raiders | Amik Robertson | CB | Louisiana Tech |
| 5 | 159 | New England Patriots | Justin Rohrwasser | K | Marshall |
| 6 | 200 | Philadelphia Eagles | Quez Watkins | WR | Southern Miss |
| 7 | 221 | Carolina Panthers | Stantley Thomas-Oliver | CB | FIU |
| 7 | 243 | Tennessee Titans | Chris Jackson | CB | Marshall |
