= Justin Rohrwasser =

American football player (born 1996)

No. 5
- Position: Placekicker

Personal information
- Born: December 7, 1996 (age 29); Clifton Park, New York, U.S.
- Listed height: 6 ft 3 in (1.91 m)
- Listed weight: 230 lb (104 kg)

Career information
- High school: Catholic Central (Troy, New York)
- College: Rhode Island (2015–2016); Marshall (2017–2019)
- NFL draft: 2020: 5th round, 159th overall pick

Career history
- New England Patriots (2020–2021)*
- * Offseason or practice squad member only

Awards and highlights
- First team All-Conference USA (2019)
- Stats at Pro Football Reference

Justin Rohrwasser (born December 7, 1996) is an American former professional football placekicker. He played college football at Marshall and was drafted by the New England Patriots in the fifth round of the 2020 NFL draft.

== College career ==
Rohrwasser played the first two years of his college career at the University of Rhode Island before transferring to Marshall University. At Rhode Island, he made 75% of his field goal attempts and 98% of his extra point attempts. In 2019, in his redshirt senior season with Marshall, he made 85.7% of his kicks with a long of 53 yards.

== Professional career ==
Pre-draft measurables
Height	Weight	Arm length	Hand span
6 ft 2 5/8 in (1.90 m)	234 lb (106 kg)	32 1/8 in (0.82 m)	8 7/8 in (0.23 m)
All values from Pro Day

The New England Patriots selected Rohrwasser in the fifth round of the 2020 NFL draft with the 159th overall pick. He was the first of three kickers selected. The move came a few weeks after they released kicker Stephen Gostkowski, who had been the Patriots kicker since 2006.

In the middle of training camp, the Patriots signed Nick Folk, who had played for the team in 2019, as competition to Rohrwasser. Rohrwasser was waived as part of the team's final cutdowns on September 5, 2020. He was signed to the practice squad the following day. He signed a reserve/future contract on January 4, 2021. On March 23, 2021, Rohrwasser was waived by the Patriots.

== Controversy ==
Upon his selection, Rohrwasser was scrutinized for having a tattoo of the logo of the Three Percenters, a far-right paramilitary group. The Three Percenters have been condemned by the Southern Poverty Law Center and the Anti-Defamation League as a white supremacist hate group. Rohrwasser claimed to have no links to the organization and denounced it. He further claimed that when he received the tattoo he thought the symbol represented military support. Some commentators questioned whether his denial of previous links with the group was authentic. On April 27, 2020, Rohrwasser pledged to have the tattoo removed completely and did so in December 2020.
