= Jaelon Darden =

American football player (born 1999)

Profile
- Positions: Wide receiver, return specialist

Personal information
- Born: January 14, 1999 (age 27); Houston, Texas, U.S.
- Listed height: 5 ft 8 in (1.73 m)
- Listed weight: 175 lb (79 kg)

Career information
- High school: Eisenhower (Houston, Texas)
- College: North Texas (2017–2020)
- NFL draft: 2021: 4th round, 129th overall pick

Career history
- Tampa Bay Buccaneers (2021–2022); Cleveland Browns (2022–2024); Seattle Seahawks (2024); BC Lions (2026)*
- * Offseason or practice squad member only

Awards and highlights
- First-team All-American (2020); Conference USA Most Valuable Player (2020); First-team All-Conference USA (2019, 2020)

Career NFL statistics
- Receptions: 9
- Receiving yards: 75
- Return yards: 1,599
- Stats at Pro Football Reference
- Stats at CFL.ca

Jaelon Darden (born January 14, 1999) is an American professional football wide receiver and return specialist who is currently a free agent. He played college football for the North Texas Mean Green. He was drafted by the Tampa Bay Buccaneers in the fourth round of the 2021 NFL draft.

== Early life ==
Darden attended Eisenhower High School in Houston, Texas. He earned all-district honors as a quarterback in 2015. He was considered a 3-star wide receiver coming out of high school. He committed to the University of North Texas to play college football on February 1, 2017 over offers from Liberty, Memphis, Southern Miss, UNLV, and Virginia Tech, among others.

== College career ==
Darden played at North Texas from 2017 to 2020. During his career he had a school record 230 receptions for 2,782 yards and 38 touchdowns. As a senior in 2020, he was the Conference USA MVP and was named an All-American by ESPN and USA Today after recording 74 receptions for 1,190 yards and 19 touchdowns. He was also a finalist for the Earl Campbell Tyler Rose Award.

=== College statistics ===
Year	Team	GP	Receiving		
Year	Team	GP	Rec	Yards	TD
2017	North Texas	13	32	281	3
2018	North Texas	13	48	575	4
2019	North Texas	12	76	736	12
2020	North Texas	9	74	1,190	19
Career		47	230	2,782	38

== Professional career ==
Pre-draft measurables
Height	Weight	Arm length	Hand span	Wingspan	40-yard dash	10-yard split	20-yard split	20-yard shuttle	Three-cone drill	Vertical jump	Broad jump	Bench press
5 ft 7 5/8 in (1.72 m)	174 lb (79 kg)	30 5/8 in (0.78 m)	8 3/4 in (0.22 m)	6 ft 0 1/2 in (1.84 m)	4.46 s	1.54 s	2.58 s	4.10 s	6.67 s	35.5 in (0.90 m)	10 ft 2 in (3.10 m)	11 reps
All values from Pro Day

=== Tampa Bay Buccaneers ===
Darden was drafted by the Tampa Bay Buccaneers in the fourth round, 129th overall, of the 2021 NFL draft. He signed his four-year rookie contract with Tampa Bay on May 19, 2021. He was waived on December 6, 2022.

=== Cleveland Browns ===
Darden was claimed off waivers by the Cleveland Browns on December 7, 2022.

On August 29, 2023, Darden was waived by the Browns and re-signed to the practice squad. He signed a reserve/future contract on January 15, 2024.

On August 27, 2024, Darden was waived by the Browns and re-signed to the practice squad. He was promoted to the active roster on September 7, but waived a week later. Darden was re-signed to the practice squad on September 17. He was promoted to the active roster on October 29, but waived on December 4.

=== Seattle Seahawks ===
On December 5, 2024, Darden was claimed off waivers by the Seattle Seahawks. On March 10, 2025, Darden left the Seahawks as a free agent.

=== BC Lions ===
On December 1, 2025, Darden signed with the BC Lions of the Canadian Football League (CFL). On May 31, 2026, Darden was released by Lions, during their final cuts before the start of the 2026 CFL season.
