= Chris Jackson (defensive back) =

American football player (born 1998)

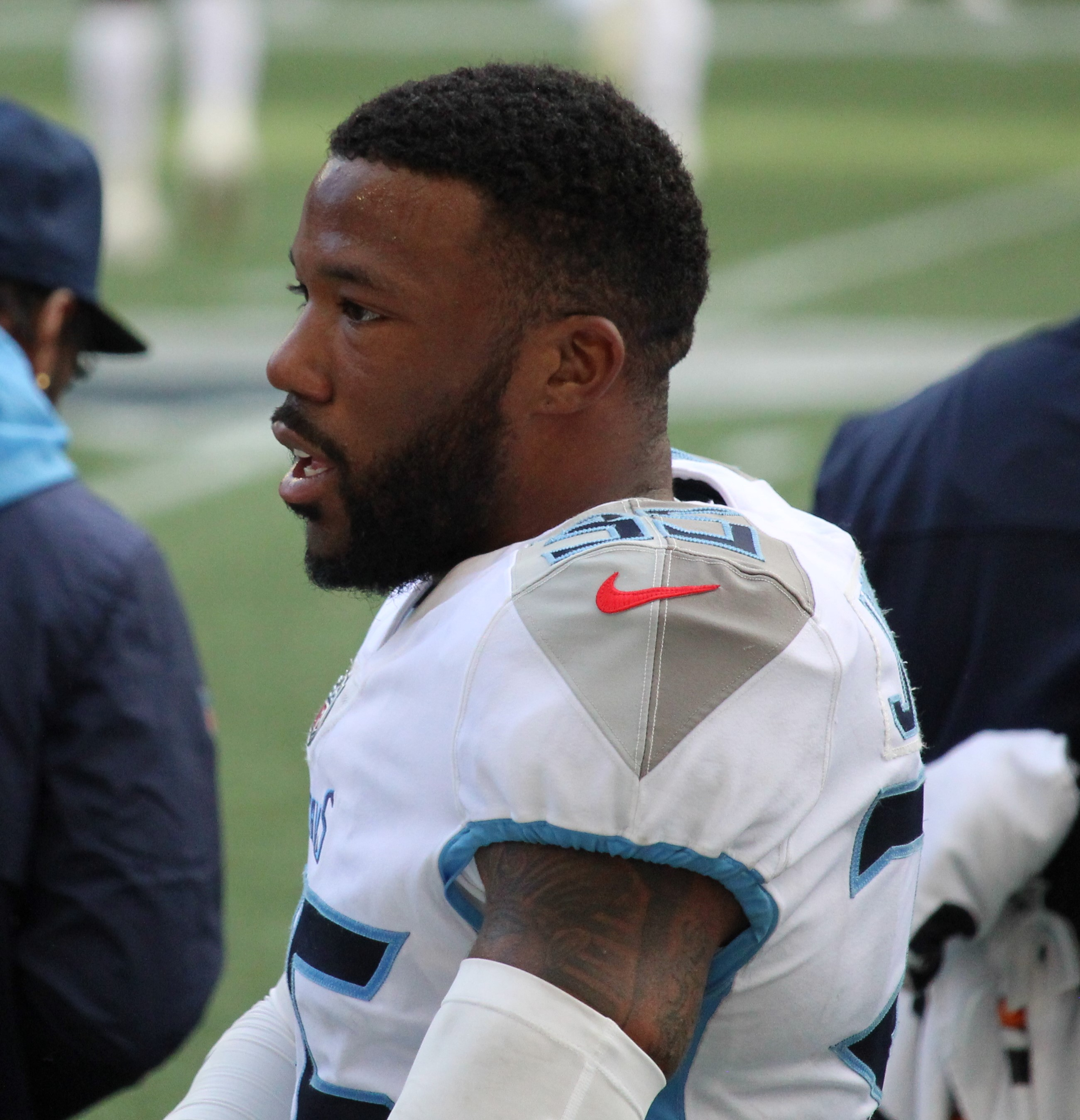
- Jackson with the Tennessee Titans in 2021

Profile
- Position: Cornerback

Personal information
- Born: April 13, 1998 (age 28); Minneapolis, Minnesota, U.S.
- Listed height: 5 ft 10 in (1.78 m)
- Listed weight: 193 lb (88 kg)

Career information
- High school: FAMU (Tallahassee, Florida)
- College: Marshall (2016–2019)
- NFL draft: 2020: 7th round, 243rd overall pick

Career history
- Tennessee Titans (2020–2022); Birmingham Stallions (2024); Edmonton Elks (2025)*
- * Offseason or practice squad member only

Awards and highlights
- UFL champion (2024); First-team All-Conference USA (2019)

Career NFL statistics
- Total tackles: 59
- Pass deflections: 5
- Stats at Pro Football Reference
- Stats at CFL.ca

Christopher D'Wayne Jackson (born April 13, 1998) is an American professional football cornerback. He played college football at Marshall. He was selected by the Tennessee Titans in the seventh round of the 2020 NFL draft.

== College career ==
Jackson was a member of the Marshall Thundering Herd for four seasons. He was named first-team All-Conference USA after making 25 tackles with one interception and 11 passes broken up as a senior. Jackson finished his collegiate career with 189 total tackles, 6.5 tackles for loss, seven interceptions, 45 passes defensed and two fumble recoveries in 47 games.

== Professional career ==
Pre-draft measurables
Height	Weight	Arm length	Hand span	Wingspan	40-yard dash	10-yard split	20-yard split	20-yard shuttle	Three-cone drill	Vertical jump	Broad jump	Bench press
5 ft 10 1/8 in (1.78 m)	193 lb (88 kg)	31 1/2 in (0.80 m)	8 3/4 in (0.22 m)	6 ft 3 1/2 in (1.92 m)	4.48 s	1.50 s	2.59 s	4.32 s	6.94 s	36.0 in (0.91 m)	10 ft 2 in (3.10 m)	15 reps
All values from Pro Day

=== Tennessee Titans ===
Jackson was selected by the Tennessee Titans in the seventh round with the 243rd overall pick in the 2020 NFL draft. He was placed on the reserve/COVID-19 list by the team on November 28, 2020, and activated on December 10.

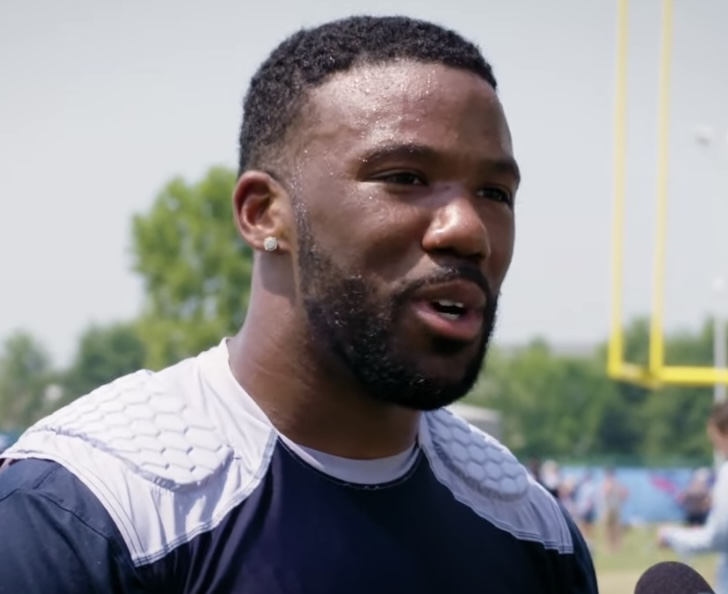
Jackson in 2021

On November 23, 2021, Jackson was placed on injured reserve. He was activated on December 23.

On August 30, 2022, Jackson was waived by the Titans and signed to the practice squad the next day. He was promoted to the active roster on September 16, 2022. He was placed on injured reserve on September 21.

On August 14, 2023, Jackson was waived by the Titans.

=== Birmingham Stallions ===
On December 19, 2023, Jackson signed with the Birmingham Stallions of the United States Football League (USFL). He was placed on injured reserve on April 23, 2024. He re-signed with the team on August 29, 2024. He was released on January 22, 2025.

=== Edmonton Elks ===
On March 21, 2025, Jackson signed with the Edmonton Elks of the Canadian Football League (CFL). He was released on May 26.
