= D'Antne Demery =

American gridiron football player (born 1997)

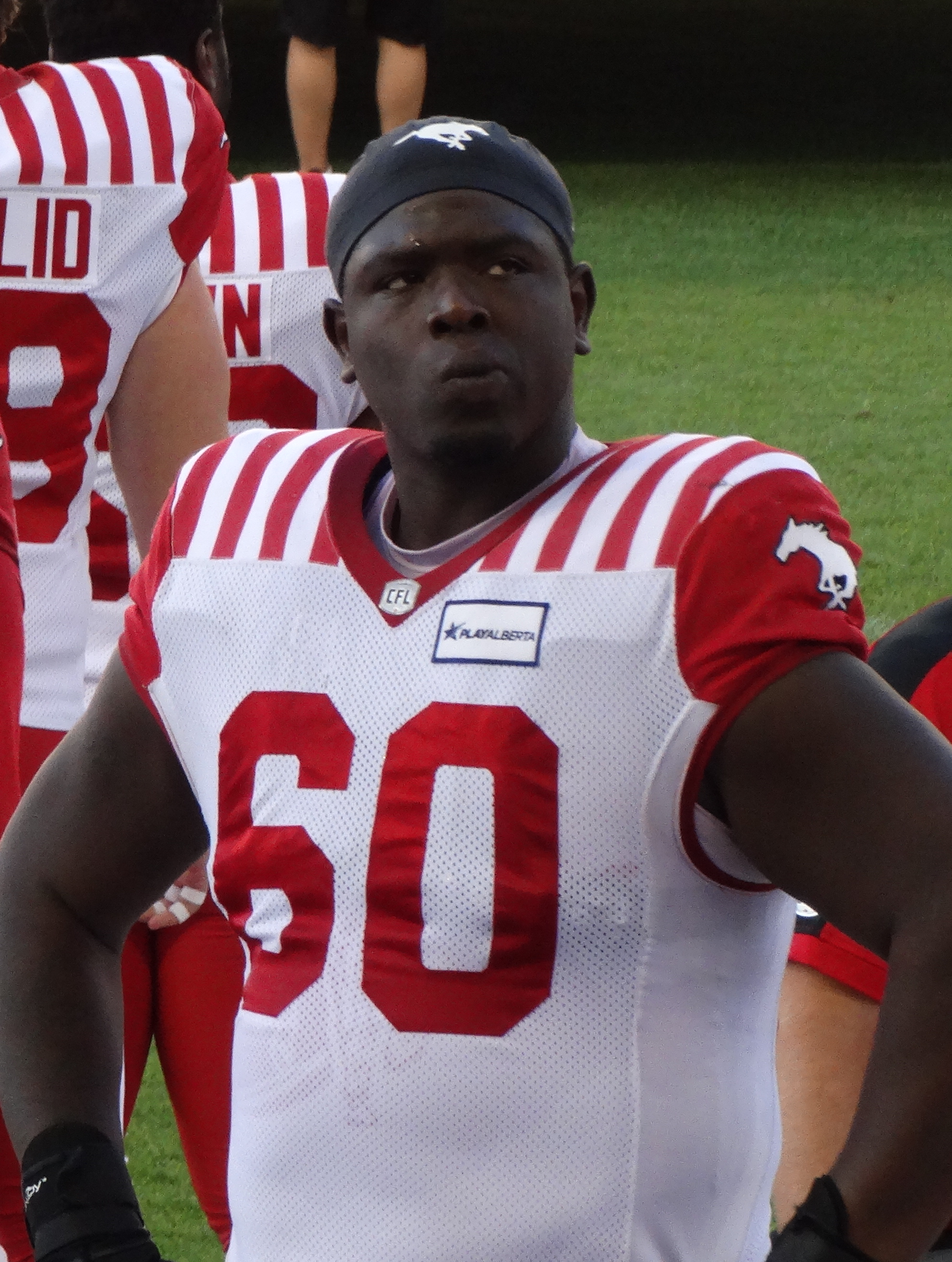
- Demery with the Calgary Stampeders in 2024

No. 60 – Calgary Stampeders
- Position: Offensive lineman
- Roster status: Active
- CFL status: American

Personal information
- Born: September 5, 1997 (age 29); Brunswick, Georgia, U. S.
- Listed height: 6 ft 4 in (1.93 m)
- Listed weight: 322 lb (146 kg)

Career information
- High school: Brunswick
- College: FIU
- NFL draft: 2021: undrafted

Career history
- 2021–2022: Edmonton Elks
- 2023–present: Calgary Stampeders
- Stats at CFL.ca

D'Antne Demery (born September 5, 1997) is an American professional football offensive lineman for the Calgary Stampeders of the Canadian Football League (CFL). He played college football at FIU. He has also been a member of the Edmonton Elks.

== Early life ==
Demery played high school football at Brunswick High School in Brunswick, Georgia. He played in the 2017 U.S. Army All-American Bowl. He had originally signed a national letter of intent to play college football at Georgia but Georgia released him from his letter of intent after he was arrested for misdemeanor simple battery and criminal trespass in April 2017. In June 2018, Demery pled guilty to simple battery, criminal trespass and disorderly conduct.

== College career ==
Demery played college football at Hutchinson Community College in 2017.

He then transferred to play at FIU from 2018 to 2020. He played in 11 games, all starts, at left tackle in 2018 and earned honorable mention All-Conference USA (C-USA) honors. Demery played in 13 games, starting 12 at left tackle, in 2019 and was named honorable mention C-USA for the second consecutive year. In 2020, he played in the first two games of the season before suffering a season-ending injury.

== Professional career ==
=== Edmonton Elks ===
Demery signed with the Edmonton Elks of the Canadian Football League (CFL) on May 24, 2021. On July 21, he was moved to the team's practice roster before the start of the 2021 CFL season. He was promoted to the active roster on July 31, 2021, and started the Elks' Week 1 game against the Ottawa Redblacks at left tackle. That was the only game Demery played in during the 2021 season. He was placed on injured reserve on August 14, 2021.

Demery was released by the Elks on May 26, 2022. He was later signed to the Elks' practice roster on July 12, 2022, but was again released on July 17, 2022.

=== Calgary Stampeders ===
Demery signed with the Calgary Stampeders of the CFL on March 2, 2023. He was moved to the practice roster on July 6, signed to the active roster on July 11, moved back to the practice roster on July 29, signed back to the active roster on August 24, moved to the practice roster on September 3, and promoted back to the active roster on September 29. Overall, he played in 10 games, all starts, for the Stampeders in 2023.
