= Cain Madden =

American football player (born 1996)

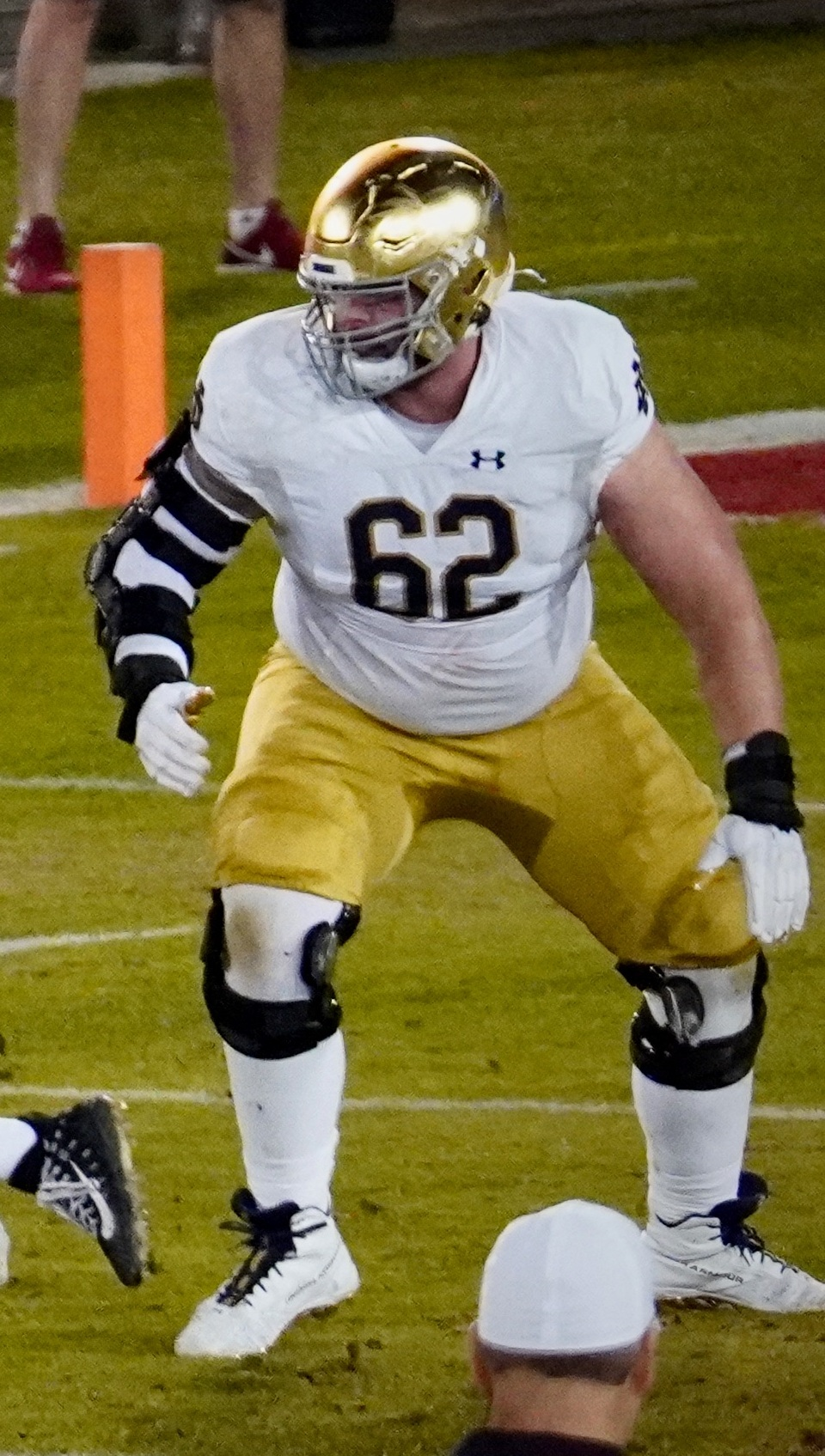
- Madden with Notre Dame in 2021

Profile
- Position: Offensive lineman

Personal information
- Born: December 23, 1996 (age 29); South Webster, Ohio, U.S.
- Listed height: 6 ft 2 in (1.88 m)
- Listed weight: 310 lb (141 kg)

Career information
- High school: Minford (OH)
- College: Marshall (2016–2020); Notre Dame (2021)
- NFL draft: 2022: undrafted

Awards and highlights
- Second-team All-American (2020)

Richard Caine Madden (born December 23, 1996) is an American former football offensive lineman.

== Early life ==
Madden was born on December 23, 1996, in South Webster, Ohio. He attended Minford High School near there, playing on the offensive and defensive lines. He was twice an All-Ohio selection and also played in the North-South All-Star Classic. He also participated in shot put and discus throw, placing second in school history in shot put and third for the discus throw.

== College career ==
=== Marshall ===
He accepted a scholarship offer from Marshall University in 2016, spending his first season as a redshirt. He played on the varsity team as a redshirt-freshman the following year, appearing in all 13 games. He earned a starting role early in the 2018 season, after an injury to Alex Mollette, and was on the starting lineup for the final nine games. He was nicknamed "Dump Truck" by his teammates. He started all 13 games as a redshirt-junior, being named second-team all-conference at the conclusion of the season. He helped block for the Marshall running game that finished second in their conference for rushing yards and rushing yards per game. At the end-of-season banquet, Madden was honored with the Offensive Gridiron Gladiator Award, given by the coaching staff to those who "are relentless and give everything all of the time." As a senior in 2020, he started nine of ten games, and earned first-team all-conference and second-team All-America honors.

=== Notre Dame ===
After being named All-American with Marshall in 2020, Madden transferred to University of Notre Dame for his final season in 2021. He was named pre-season All-American and made his debut in the season-opener versus Florida State.

== Professional career ==
Pre-draft measurables
Height	Weight	Arm length	Hand span	40-yard dash	10-yard split	20-yard split	20-yard shuttle	Three-cone drill	Vertical jump	Broad jump	Bench press
6 ft 2 1/2 in (1.89 m)	310 lb (141 kg)	30 3/4 in (0.78 m)	10 in (0.25 m)	5.76 s	1.96 s	3.27 s	4.87 s	8.02 s	27.0 in (0.69 m)	8 ft 7 in (2.62 m)	24 reps
All values from Pro Day

After going unselected in the 2022 NFL draft, Madden attended rookie minicamp with the New York Giants.
