= 2021 New York Jets season =

62nd season in franchise history, first under Robert Saleh

- Owner: Woody and Christopher Johnson
- General manager: Joe Douglas
- Head coach: Robert Saleh
- Home stadium: MetLife Stadium

Results
- Record: 4–13
- Division place: 4th AFC East
- Playoffs: Did not qualify
- All-Pros: KR Braxton Berrios (1st team)

Uniform
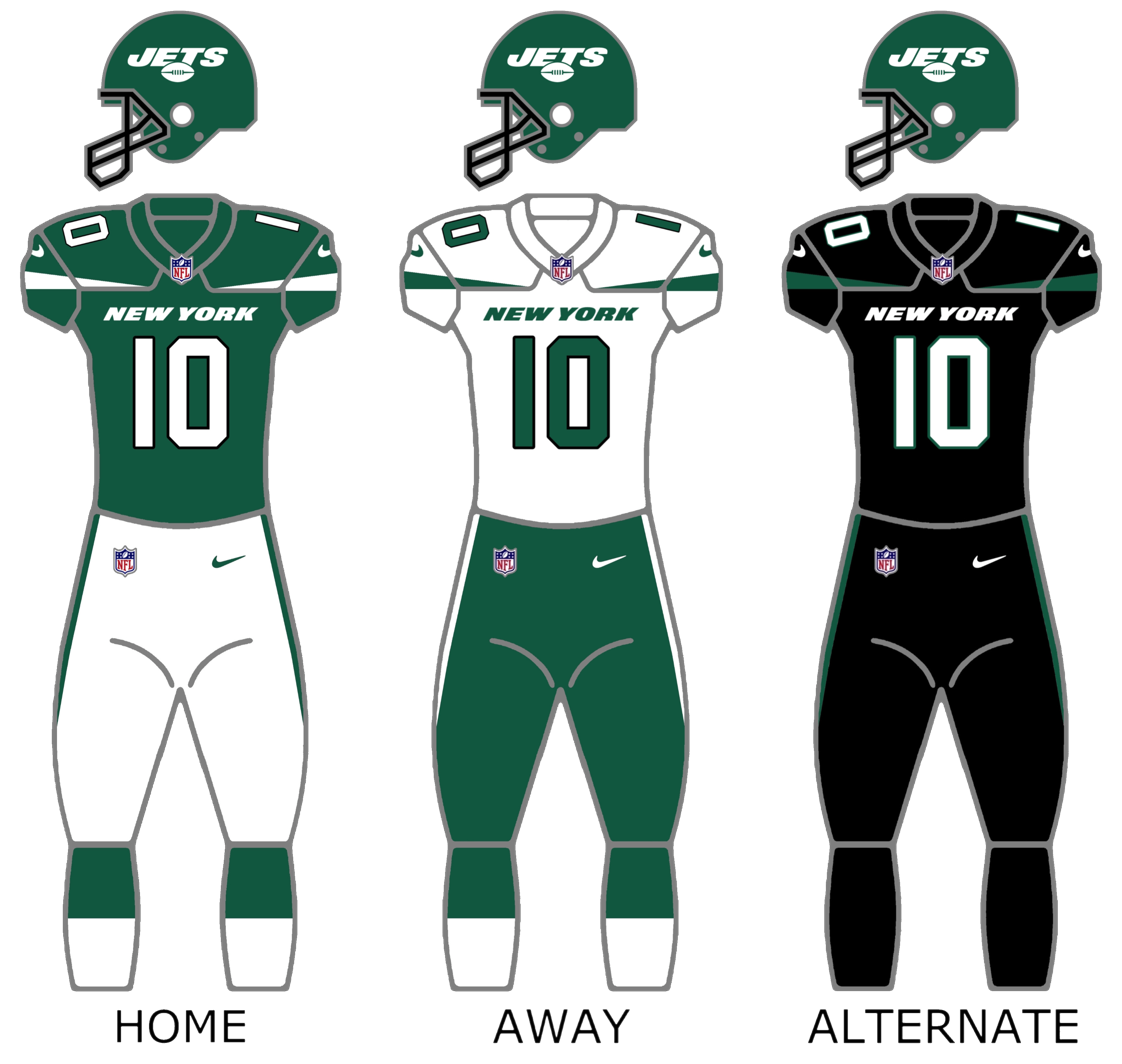

The 2021 season was the New York Jets' 52nd season in the National Football League (NFL), their 62nd overall, their third under general manager Joe Douglas and their first under head coach Robert Saleh. It began with the team's third head coach in four seasons.

The Jets improved on their 2–14 record from the previous season. Despite this, they were eliminated from playoff contention for the eleventh consecutive season in Week 14. The Jets missed the playoffs for the eleventh straight season, tying a record set between 1970–1980.

== Roster changes ==
=== Free agents ===
==== Unrestricted ====
Position	Player	2021 Team	Date signed	Contract
C	Josh Andrews	Atlanta Falcons	March 29	1 year, $1.128 million
OLB	Tarell Basham	Dallas Cowboys	March 18	2 years, $5.500 million
TE	Daniel Brown	New York Jets	April 19	1 year, $1.040 million
DT	Trevon Coley	Tennessee Titans	June 3	1 year, $0.990 million
OG	Pat Elflein	Carolina Panthers	March 15	3 year, $13.500 million
SS	Matthias Farley	Tennessee Titans	March 30	1 year, $1.090 million
QB	Joe Flacco	Philadelphia Eagles	March 23	1 year, $3.500 million
RB	Frank Gore			
ILB	Bryce Hager			
ILB	Neville Hewitt	Houston Texans	May 7	1 year, $1.700 million
OLB	Jordan Jenkins	Houston Texans	March 20	2 years, $6.000 million
LB	Frankie Luvu	Carolina Panthers	March 23	1 year, $1.100 million
CB	Arthur Maulet	Pittsburgh Steelers	May 7	1 year, $0.990 million
SS	Bradley McDougald	Tennessee Titans	August 16	1 year, $1.075 million
ILB	Patrick Onwuasor			
WR	Breshad Perriman	Detroit Lions	March 18	1 year, $2.500 million
CB	Brian Poole	New Orleans Saints	July 25	1 year, $1.128 million
TE	Ross Travis	Arizona Cardinals	May 25	1 year, $0.990 million

==== Restricted ====
Position	Player	2021 Team	Date signed	Contract
RB	Josh Adams	New York Jets	March 17	1 year, $1.180 million
ILB	Harvey Langi	New England Patriots	May 10	1 year, $1.058 million

==== Exclusive Rights ====
Position	Player	2021 Team	Date signed	Contract
RB	Bennett Jackson	New York Jets	April 8	1 year, $0.850 million

=== Signings ===
Position	Player	2020 Team	Date signed	Contract
WR	Keelan Cole	Jacksonville Jaguars	March 20	1 year, $5.500 million
RB	Tevin Coleman	San Francisco 49ers	March 26	1 year, $1.100 million
DE	Vinny Curry	Philadelphia Eagles	March 24	1 year, $1.300 million
WR	Corey Davis	Tennessee Titans	March 18	3 years, $37.500 million
ILB	Jarrad Davis	Detroit Lions	March 18	1 year, $5.500 million
OG	Dan Feeney	Los Angeles Chargers	March 20	1 year, $3.500 million
CB	Justin Hardee	New Orleans Saints	March 18	3 years, $6.750 million
QB	Josh Johnson	San Francisco 49ers	August 4	1 year, $1.075 million
FS	LaMarcus Joyner	Las Vegas Raiders	March 22	1 year, $3.000 million
TE	Tyler Kroft	Buffalo Bills	March 22	1 year, $2.000 million
DE	Carl Lawson	Cincinnati Bengals	March 18	3 years, $45.000 million
OG	Corey Levin	New England Patriots	April 8	1 year, $0.920 million
LB	Del'Shawn Phillips	Buffalo Bills	March 23	1 year, $0.780 million
DT	Sheldon Rankins	New Orleans Saints	March 23	2 years, $11.000 million

=== Releases ===
Position	Player	2021 Team	Date released
DE	Henry Anderson	New England Patriots	March 2

== Draft ==
2021 New York Jets Draft
Round	Selection	Player	Position	College
1	2	Zach Wilson	QB	BYU
1	14	Alijah Vera-Tucker	OG	USC
2	34	Elijah Moore	WR	Ole Miss
4	107	Michael Carter	RB	North Carolina
5	146	Jamien Sherwood	S	Auburn
5	154	Michael Carter II	S	Duke
5	175	Jason Pinnock	CB	Pittsburgh
6	186	Hamsah Nasirildeen	S	Florida State
6	200	Brandin Echols	CB	Kentucky
6	207	Jonathan Marshall	DT	Arkansas

== Staff ==
- Pass Game Specialist Greg Knapp was slated to be the team's pass game specialist, but he died on July 22 due to vehicular manslaughter.

2021 New York Jets staff
Front office: Owner/Chairman/CEO – Woody Johnson; Vice chairman – Christopher Johnson; President – Hymie Elhai; Executive vice president/COO – Brian Friedman; General manager – Joe Douglas; Assistant general manager – Rex Hogan; Senior director of football administration – Dave Socie; Director of player personnel – Chad Alexander; Director of pro personnel – Greg Nejmeh; Assistant director of pro personnel – Kevin Murphy; Director of college scouting – Jon Carr; Senior football advisor – Phil Savage; Head coaches: Head coach – Robert Saleh; Assistant to head coach – Steve Scarnecchia; Offensive coaches: Offensive coordinator – Mike LaFleur; Quarterbacks – Rob Calabrese; Running backs – Taylor Embree; Wide receivers – Miles Austin; Tight ends – Ron Middleton; Offensive line/run game coordinator – John Benton; Assistant offensive line – Jake Moreland; Senior offensive assistant – Matt Cavanaugh; Offensive assistant – Mack Brown; Offensive assistant – Billy Vandemerkt; Offensive consultant – John Beck	Defensive coaches: Defensive coordinator – Jeff Ulbrich; Defensive line – Aaron Whitecotton; Assistant defensive line – Nate Ollie; Linebackers – Mike Rutenberg; Senior defensive assistant/cornerbacks – Tony Oden; Safeties – Marquand Manuel; Defensive assistant – Ricky Manning; Defensive assistant – Hayes Pullard; Defensive assistant – Chip Vaughn; Special teams coaches: Special teams coordinator – Brant Boyer; Assistant special teams – Michael Ghobrial; Assistant special teams – Leon Washington; Strength and conditioning: Head strength and conditioning – Justus Galac; Assistant strength and conditioning – Joe Giacobbe; Assistant strength and conditioning – Aaron McLaurin

== Final roster ==
2021 New York Jets roster
Quarterbacks (QB): 19 Joe Flacco; 5 Mike White; 2 Zach Wilson; Running backs (RB): 48 Nick Bawden FB; 32 Michael Carter; 23 Tevin Coleman; 25 Ty Johnson; 22 La'Mical Perine; 36 Austin Walter; Wide receivers (WR): 88 Keelan Cole; 82 Jamison Crowder; 11 Denzel Mims; 16 Jeff Smith; Tight ends (TE): 81 Tyler Kroft; 83 Kenny Yeboah	Offensive linemen (OL): 72 Laurent Duvernay-Tardif G; 70 Chuma Edoga T; 67 Dan Feeney G; 69 Conor McDermott T; 78 Morgan Moses T; 62 Greg Van Roten G; 74 Greg Senat T; 75 Alijah Vera-Tucker G; Defensive linemen (DL): 94 Folorunso Fatukasi DT; 96 Jonathan Marshall DT; 91 John Franklin-Myers DE; 93 Kyle Phillips DE; 98 Sheldon Rankins DT; 97 Nathan Shepherd DT; 51 Tim Ward DE; 95 Quinnen Williams DT; 92 Jabari Zuniga DE	Linebackers (LB): 57 C. J. Mosley MLB; 45 Hamsah Nasirildeen OLB; 43 Del'Shawn Phillips OLB; 9 Javin White OLB; 56 Quincy Williams OLB; Defensive backs (DB): 30 Michael Carter II CB; 21 Ashtyn Davis FS; 27 Isaiah Dunn CB; 26 Brandin Echols CB; 40 Javelin Guidry CB; 37 Bryce Hall CB; 34 Justin Hardee CB; 1 Kai Nacua FS; 39 Will Parks SS; 41 Jason Pinnock CB; 33 Elijah Riley SS; 29 Rachad Wildgoose CB; Special teams (ST): 42 Thomas Hennessy LS; 15 Eddy Piñeiro K; 7 Braden Mann P	Practice squad: 61 Freedom Akinmoladun DE; 6 Matt Ammendola K; 3 Tarik Black WR; 54 Ronald Blair DE; 87 Daniel Brown TE (PS/I); 46 Noah Dawkins ILB; 44 Brandon Dillon TE; 63 Grant Hermanns T; 38 Lamar Jackson CB; 14 D. J. Montgomery WR; 89 Joshua Perkins TE; 66 Ross Pierschbacher G; 55 Hamilcar Rashed Jr. DE; 65 Dru Samia G; 79 Tanzel Smart DT; 17 Vyncint Smith WR; 4 Ken Webster CB (COVID-19); 71 Isaiah Williams G; Reserve: 77 Mekhi Becton T (IR); 10 Braxton Berrios WR (IR); 53 Blake Cashman OLB (IR); -- Cameron Clark G (IR); 84 Corey Davis WR (IR); 52 Jarrad Davis MLB (COVID-19); 76 George Fant T (IR); -- Parker Ferguson T (IR); 86 Ryan Griffin TE (IR); 47 Bryce Huff DE (IR); -- Lamarcus Joyner FS (IR); 58 Carl Lawson DE (IR); -- Zane Lewis CB (IR); 20 Marcus Maye FS (IR); 60 Connor McGovern C (IR); 8 Elijah Moore WR (IR); -- Jamien Sherwood OLB (IR); 85 Trevon Wesco TE (IR); Rookies in italics 52 active, 18 reserve, 16 practice squad (2 exempt)

== Preseason ==
Week	Date	Opponent	Result	Record	Venue	Recap
1	August 14	at New York Giants	W 12–7	1–0	MetLife Stadium	Recap
2	August 21	at Green Bay Packers	W 23–14	2–0	Lambeau Field	Recap
3	August 27	Philadelphia Eagles	T 31–31	2–0–1	MetLife Stadium	Recap

== Regular season ==
=== Schedule ===
Week	Date	Opponent	Result	Record	Venue	Recap
1	September 12	at Carolina Panthers	**L** 14–19	0–1	Bank of America Stadium	Recap
2	September 19	**New England Patriots**	**L** 6–25	0–2	MetLife Stadium	Recap
3	September 26	at Denver Broncos	**L** 0–26	0–3	Empower Field at Mile High	Recap
4	October 3	Tennessee Titans	**W** 27–24 (OT)	1–3	MetLife Stadium	Recap
5	October 10	at Atlanta Falcons	**L** 20–27	1–4	(United Kingdom) Tottenham Hotspur Stadium (London)	Recap
6	Bye					
7	October 24	at **New England Patriots**	**L** 13–54	1–5	Gillette Stadium	Recap
8	October 31	Cincinnati Bengals	**W** 34–31	2–5	MetLife Stadium	Recap
9	November 4	at Indianapolis Colts	**L** 30–45	2–6	Lucas Oil Stadium	Recap
10	November 14	**Buffalo Bills**	**L** 17–45	2–7	MetLife Stadium	Recap
11	November 21	**Miami Dolphins**	**L** 17–24	2–8	MetLife Stadium	Recap
12	November 28	at Houston Texans	**W** 21–14	3–8	NRG Stadium	Recap
13	December 5	Philadelphia Eagles	**L** 18–33	3–9	MetLife Stadium	Recap
14	December 12	New Orleans Saints	**L** 9–30	3–10	MetLife Stadium	Recap
15	December 19	at **Miami Dolphins**	**L** 24–31	3–11	Hard Rock Stadium	Recap
16	December 26	Jacksonville Jaguars	**W** 26–21	4–11	MetLife Stadium	Recap
17	January 2	Tampa Bay Buccaneers	**L** 24–28	4–12	MetLife Stadium	Recap
18	January 9	at **Buffalo Bills**	**L** 10–27	4–13	Highmark Stadium	Recap

Note: Intra-division opponents are in bold text.

=== Game summaries ===
==== Week 1: at Carolina Panthers ====
Week 1: New York Jets at Carolina Panthers – Game summary

Quarter	1	2	3	4	Total
Jets	0	0	8	6	**14**
**Panthers**	0	16	0	3	**19**

at Bank of America Stadium, Charlotte, North Carolina

- Date: September 12
- Game time: 1:00 p.m. EDT
- Game weather: Sunny, 84 °F (29 °C)
- Game attendance: 70,211
- Referee: Clay Martin
- TV announcers (CBS): Andrew Catalon and Tiki Barber
- Recap, Game Book

Game information

**First quarter**

- No scoring plays

**Second quarter**

- CAR – Ryan Santoso 22-yard field goal, 7:26. Panthers 3–0. **Drive: 6 plays, 29 yards, 2:00.**
- CAR – Robby Anderson 57-yard pass from Sam Darnold (kick failed), 4:06. Panthers 9–0. **Drive: 1 play, 57 yards, 0:08.**
- CAR – Sam Darnold 5-yard run (Ryan Santoso kick), 0:35. Panthers 16–0. **Drive: 7 plays, 62 yards, 2:00.**

**Third quarter**

- NYJ – Corey Davis 22-yard pass from Zach Wilson (Zach Wilson run), 1:25. Panthers 16–8. **Drive: 8 plays, 70 yards, 4:40.**

**Fourth quarter**

- CAR – Ryan Santoso 29-yard field goal, 8:42. Panthers 19–8. **Drive: 12 plays, 52 yards, 7:43.**
- NYJ – Corey Davis 8-yard pass from Zach Wilson (pass failed), 1:56. Panthers 19–14. **Drive: 10 plays, 93 yards, 2:31.**

**Top passers**

- NYJ – Zach Wilson – 20/37, 258 yards, 2 TD, INT
- CAR – Sam Darnold – 24/35, 279 yards, TD

**Top rushers**

- NYJ – Tevin Coleman – 9 rushes, 24 yards
- CAR – Christian McCaffrey – 21 rushes, 98 yards

**Top receivers**

- NYJ – Corey Davis – 5 receptions, 97 yards, 2 TD
- CAR – Christian McCaffrey – 9 receptions, 89 yards

Former Jets quarterback Sam Darnold, traded to Carolina prior to the season, led the Panthers to an early lead over his former team, scoring two touchdowns including a 57-yard pass to former Jets teammate Robby Anderson. Two late touchdown passes by Jets rookie quarterback Zach Wilson were not enough for New York to come back and win. For the third straight year, the Jets started the season 0–1. Offensive Tackle Mekhi Becton also suffered a knee injury during the game, and would later be put on injured reserve after opting for surgery.

==== Week 2: vs. New England Patriots ====
Week 2: New England Patriots at New York Jets – Game summary

Quarter	1	2	3	4	Total
**Patriots**	10	3	9	3	**25**
Jets	0	3	0	3	**6**

at MetLife Stadium, East Rutherford, New Jersey

- Date: September 19
- Game time: 1:00 p.m. EDT
- Game weather: Sunny, 81 °F (27 °C)
- Game attendance: 75,626
- Referee: Shawn Hochuli
- TV announcers (CBS): Kevin Harlan, Trent Green and Melanie Collins
- Recap, Game Book

Game information

**First quarter**

- NE – Nick Folk 46-yard field goal, 4:46. Patriots 3–0. **Drive: 6 plays, 7 yards, 2:59.**
- NE – James White 7-yard run (Nick Folk kick), 0:57. Patriots 10–0. **Drive: 6 plays, 72 yards, 3:13.**

**Second quarter**

- NYJ – Matt Ammendola 21-yard field goal, 9:52. Patriots 10–3. **Drive: 11 plays, 59 yards, 6:05.**
- NE – Nick Folk 49-yard field goal, 0:13. Patriots 13–3. **Drive: 10 plays, 38 yards, 1:56.**

**Third quarter**

- NE – Damien Harris 26-yard run (kick failed), 10:24. Patriots 19–3. **Drive: 2 plays, 35 yards, 0:51.**
- NE – Nick Folk 32-yard field goal, 1:09. Patriots 22–3. **Drive: 8 plays, 43 yards, 3:31.**

**Fourth quarter**

- NYJ – Matt Ammendola 35-yard field goal, 6:11. Patriots 22–6. **Drive: 12 plays, 66 yards, 5:01.**
- NE – Nick Folk 26-yard field goal, 1:57. Patriots 25–6. **Drive: 7 plays, 17 yards, 2:34.**

**Top passers**

- NE – Mac Jones – 22/30, 186 yards
- NYJ – Zach Wilson – 19/33, 210 yards, 4 INT

**Top rushers**

- NE – Damien Harris – 16 rushes, 62 yards, TD
- NYJ – Michael Carter – 11 rushes, 59 yards

**Top receivers**

- NE – James White – 6 receptions, 45 yards
- NYJ – Braxton Berrios – 7 receptions, 73 yards

In a battle between rookie quarterbacks, Zach Wilson threw four interceptions to the Patriots defense while Patriots quarterback Mac Jones had a quietly efficient performance, completing over 70% of his passes. With their 11th straight loss to the Patriots, the Jets fell to 0–2.

==== Week 3: at Denver Broncos ====
Week 3: New York Jets at Denver Broncos – Game summary

Quarter	1	2	3	4	Total
Jets	0	0	0	0	**0**
**Broncos**	7	10	3	6	**26**

at Empower Field at Mile High, Denver, Colorado

- Date: September 26
- Game time: 4:05 p.m. EDT/2:05 p.m. MDT
- Game weather: Sunny, 85 °F (29 °C)
- Game attendance: 75,882
- Referee: Land Clark
- TV announcers (CBS): Spero Dedes and Jay Feely
- Recap, Game Book

Game information

**First quarter**

- DEN – Javonte Williams 1-yard run (Brandon McManus kick), 3:27. Broncos 7–0. **Drive: 11 plays, 75 yards, 7:10.**

**Second quarter**

- DEN – Brandon McManus 45-yard field goal, 14:50. Broncos 10–0. **Drive: 6 plays, 37 yards, 1:59.**
- DEN – Melvin Gordon 1-yard run (Brandon McManus kick), 0:56. Broncos 17–0. **Drive: 9 plays, 64 yards, 2:42.**

**Third quarter**

- DEN – Brandon McManus 47-yard field goal, 9:23. Broncos 20–0. **Drive: 8 plays, 37 yards, 4:37.**

**Fourth quarter**

- DEN – Brandon McManus 21-yard field goal, 6:41. Broncos 23–0. **Drive: 11 plays, 71 yards, 7:33.**
- DEN – Brandon McManus 36-yard field goal, 1:00. Broncos 26–0. **Drive: 6 plays, 12 yards, 2:02.**

**Top passers**

- NYJ – Zach Wilson – 19/35, 160 yards, 2 INT
- DEN – Teddy Bridgewater – 19/25, 235 yards

**Top rushers**

- NYJ – Michael Carter – 9 rushes, 24 yards
- DEN – Melvin Gordon – 18 rushes, 61 yards, TD

**Top receivers**

- NYJ – Corey Davis – 5 receptions, 41 yards
- DEN – Tim Patrick – 5 receptions, 98 yards

==== Week 4: vs. Tennessee Titans ====
Week 4: Tennessee Titans at New York Jets – Game summary

Quarter	1	2	3	4	OT	Total
Titans	3	6	0	15	0	**24**
**Jets**	0	7	3	14	3	**27**

at MetLife Stadium, East Rutherford, New Jersey

- Date: October 3
- Game time: 1:00 p.m. EDT
- Game weather: Mostly sunny, 78 °F (26 °C)
- Game attendance: 70,232
- Referee: Adrian Hill
- TV announcers (CBS): Greg Gumbel, Adam Archuleta and AJ Ross
- Recap, Game Book

Game information

**First quarter**

- TEN – Randy Bullock 44-yard field goal, 7:06. Titans 3–0. **Drive: 12 plays, 31 yards, 6:10.**

**Second quarter**

- TEN – Randy Bullock 46-yard field goal, 12:53. Titans 6–0. **Drive: 11 plays, 56 yards, 6:10.**
- TEN – Randy Bullock 36-yard field goal, 10:29. Titans 9–0. **Drive: 5 plays, 14 yards, 1:46.**
- NYJ – Michael Carter 2-yard run (Matt Ammendola kick), 4:49. Titans 9–7. **Drive: 11 plays, 75 yards, 5:40.**

**Third quarter**

- NYJ – Matt Ammendola 27-yard field goal, 0:19. Jets 10–9. **Drive: 8 plays, 78 yards, 3:17.**

**Fourth quarter**

- TEN – Derrick Henry 1-yard run (Ryan Tannehill–MyCole Pruitt pass), 13:14. Titans 17–10. **Drive: 6 plays, 75 yards, 2:05.**
- NYJ – Jamison Crowder 3-yard pass from Zach Wilson (Matt Ammendola kick), 11:30. Tied 17–17. **Drive: 4 plays, 77 yards, 1:44.**
- NYJ – Corey Davis 53-yard pass from Zach Wilson (Matt Ammendola kick), 9:06. Jets 24–17. **Drive: 1 play, 53 yards, 0:10.**
- TEN – Cameron Batson 2-yard pass from Ryan Tannehill (Randy Bullock kick), 0:16. Tied 24–24. **Drive: 11 plays, 74 yards, 1:53.**

**Overtime**

- NYJ – Matt Ammendola 22-yard field goal, 4:31. Jets 27–24. **Drive: 13 plays, 71 yards, 5:29.**

**Top passers**

- TEN – Ryan Tannehill – 30/49, 298 yards, TD
- NYJ – Zach Wilson – 21/34, 297 yards, 2 TD, INT

**Top rushers**

- TEN – Derrick Henry – 33 rushes, 157 yards, TD
- NYJ – Michael Carter – 13 rushes, 38 yards, TD

**Top receivers**

- TEN – Jeremy McNichols – 8 receptions, 74 yards
- NYJ – Corey Davis – 4 receptions, 111 yards, TD

Despite a slow start, Wilson passed for two touchdowns and led the Jets offense to a go-ahead field goal in overtime. The Titans missed a potential game-tying field goal on the second drive of overtime, allowing New York to win its first game of the season.

==== Week 5: at Atlanta Falcons ====
NFL London games

Week 5: New York Jets at Atlanta Falcons – Game summary

Quarter	1	2	3	4	Total
Jets	0	3	6	11	**20**
**Falcons**	10	10	0	7	**27**

at Tottenham Hotspur Stadium, London, England

- Date: October 10
- Game time: 1:30 p.m. BST/9:30 a.m. EDT
- Game weather: Mostly cloudy, 63 °F (17 °C)
- Game attendance: 60,589
- Referee: Tony Corrente
- TV announcers (NFLN): Greg Gumbel, Adam Archuleta, AJ Ross, and Melissa Stark
- Recap, Game Book

Game information

**First quarter**

- ATL – Younghoe Koo 31-yard field goal, 8:46. Falcons 3–0. **Drive: 14 plays, 62 yards, 6:14.**
- ATL – Kyle Pitts 2-yard pass from Matt Ryan (Younghoe Koo kick), 1:42. Falcons 10–0. **Drive: 10 plays, 92 yards, 5:16.**

**Second quarter**

- ATL – Hayden Hurst 17-yard pass from Matt Ryan (Younghoe Koo kick), 11:01. Falcons 17–0. **Drive: 8 plays, 77 yards, 3:59.**
- NYJ – Matt Ammendola 31-yard field goal, 2:14. Falcons 17–3. **Drive: 16 plays, 74 yards, 7:43.**
- ATL – Younghoe Koo 52-yard field goal, 0:00. Falcons 20–3. **Drive: 10 plays, 42 yards, 2:14.**

**Third quarter**

- NYJ – Ty Johnson 1-yard run (kick failed), 10:56. Falcons 20–9. **Drive: 7 plays, 29 yards, 4:04.**

**Fourth quarter**

- NYJ – Michael Carter 2-yard run (Zach Wilson-Jamison Crowder pass), 6:55. Falcons 20–17. **Drive: 4 plays, 90 yards, 2:35.**
- ATL – Mike Davis 3-yard run (Younghoe Koo kick), 2:19. Falcons 27–17. **Drive: 9 plays, 75 yards, 4:36.**
- NYJ – Matt Ammendola 49-yard field goal, 0:17. Falcons 27–20. **Drive: 12 plays, 44 yards, 2:02.**

**Top passers**

- NYJ – Zach Wilson – 19/32, 192 yards, INT
- ATL – Matt Ryan – 33/45, 342 yards, 2 TD

**Top rushers**

- NYJ – Michael Carter – 10 rushes, 38 yards, TD
- ATL – Cordarrelle Patterson – 14 rushes, 54 yards

**Top receivers**

- NYJ – Corey Davis – 4 receptions, 45 yards
- ATL – Kyle Pitts – 9 receptions, 119 yards, TD

==== Week 7: at New England Patriots ====
Week 7: New York Jets at New England Patriots – Game summary

Quarter	1	2	3	4	Total
Jets	0	7	6	0	**13**
**Patriots**	14	17	3	20	**54**

at Gillette Stadium, Foxborough, Massachusetts

- Date: October 24
- Game time: 1:00 p.m. EDT
- Game weather: Sunny, 54 °F (12 °C)
- Game attendance: 65,878
- Referee: Brad Rogers
- TV announcers (CBS): Andrew Catalon, James Lofton and Amanda Balionis
- Recap, Game Book

Game information

**First quarter**

- NE – Nelson Agholor 25-yard pass from Kendrick Bourne (Nick Folk kick), 12:43. Patriots 7–0. **Drive: 4 plays, 65 yards, 2:17.**
- NE – Damien Harris 1-yard run (Nick Folk kick), 7:21. Patriots 14–0. **Drive: 7 plays, 53 yards, 3:25.**

**Second quarter**

- NE – Nick Folk 39-yard field goal, 14:10. Patriots 17–0. **Drive: 8 plays, 41 yards, 2:38.**
- NYJ – Corey Davis 3-yard pass from Mike White (Matt Ammendola kick), 10:39. Patriots 17–7. **Drive: 6 plays, 69 yards, 3:31.**
- NE – Brandon Bolden 15-yard pass from Mac Jones (Nick Folk kick), 5:29. Patriots 24–7. **Drive: 12 plays, 73 yards, 5:10.**
- NE – Hunter Henry 1-yard pass from Mac Jones (Nick Folk kick), 0:27. Patriots 31–7. **Drive: 11 plays, 72 yards, 1:28.**

**Third quarter**

- NYJ – Elijah Moore 19-yard run (run failed), 11:38. Patriots 31–13. **Drive: 7 plays, 77 yards, 3:22.**
- NE – Nick Folk 50-yard field goal, 7:03. Patriots 34–13. **Drive: 9 plays, 43 yards, 4:35.**

**Fourth quarter**

- NE – Damien Harris 3-yard run (Nick Folk kick), 13:29. Patriots 41–13. **Drive: 5 plays, 43 yards, 2:39.**
- NE – J. J. Taylor 1-yard run (kick failed), 9:10. Patriots 47–13. **Drive: 4 plays, 53 yards, 2:04.**
- NE – J. J. Taylor 1-yard run (Nick Folk kick), 2:59. Patriots 54–13. **Drive: 9 plays, 78 yards, 3:43.**

**Top passers**

- NYJ – Mike White – 20/32, 202 yards, TD, 2 INT
- NE – Mac Jones – 24/36, 307 yards, 2 TD

**Top rushers**

- NYJ – Michael Carter – 11 rushes, 37 yards
- NE – Damien Harris – 14 rushes, 106 yards, 2 TD

**Top receivers**

- NYJ – Michael Carter – 8 receptions, 67 yards
- NE – Brandon Bolden – 6 receptions, 79 yards, TD

With the brutal loss the Jets fell to 1-5 while suffering their 12th straight loss to New England since 2016.

==== Week 8: vs. Cincinnati Bengals ====
Week 8: Cincinnati Bengals at New York Jets – Game summary

Quarter	1	2	3	4	Total
Bengals	0	17	7	7	**31**
**Jets**	7	7	3	17	**34**

at MetLife Stadium, East Rutherford, New Jersey

- Date: October 31
- Game time: 1:00 p.m. EDT
- Game weather: Partly cloudy, 64 °F (18 °C)
- Game attendance: 67,503
- Referee: Craig Wrolstad
- TV announcers (CBS): Kevin Harlan, Trent Green and Melanie Collins
- Recap, Game Book

Game information

**First quarter**

- NYJ – Michael Carter 8-yard run (Matt Ammendola kick), 8:38. Jets 7–0. **Drive: 10 plays, 75 yards, 6:22.**

**Second quarter**

- CIN – Joe Mixon 1-yard run (Evan McPherson kick), 14:57. Tied 7–7. **Drive: 4 plays, 15 yards, 1:31.**
- CIN – Ja'Marr Chase 2-yard pass from Joe Burrow (Evan McPherson kick), 3:21. Bengals 14–7. **Drive: 8 plays, 70 yards, 4:02.**
- CIN – Evan McPherson 21-yard field goal, 1:51. Bengals 17–7. **Drive: 5 plays, 50 yards, 0:49.**
- NYJ – Braxton Berrios 8-yard pass from Mike White (Matt Ammendola kick), 0:15. Bengals 17–14. **Drive: 8 plays, 67 yards, 1:36.**

**Third quarter**

- NYJ – Matt Ammendola 24-yard field goal, 5:17. Tied 17–17. **Drive: 13 plays, 82 yards, 6:59.**
- CIN – Joe Mixon 8-yard pass from Joe Burrow (Evan McPherson kick), 3:11. Bengals 24–17. **Drive: 4 plays, 75 yards, 2:06.**

**Fourth quarter**

- NYJ – Matt Ammendola 24-yard field goal, 12:28. Bengals 24–20. **Drive: 10 plays, 69 yards, 5:43.**
- CIN – Tyler Boyd 10-yard pass from Joe Burrow (Evan McPherson kick), 7:29. Bengals 31–20. **Drive: 12 plays, 75 yards, 4:59.**
- NYJ – Ty Johnson 19-yard pass from Mike White (pass failed), 4:36. Bengals 31–26. **Drive: 8 plays, 75 yards, 2:53.**
- NYJ – Tyler Kroft 13-yard pass from Mike White (Jamison Crowder–Mike White pass), 3:45. Jets 34–31. **Drive: 2 plays, 14 yards, 0:47.**

**Top passers**

- CIN – Joe Burrow – 21/34, 259 yards, 3 TD, INT
- NYJ – Mike White – 37/45, 405 yards, 3 TD, 2 INT

**Top rushers**

- CIN – Joe Mixon – 14 rushes, 33 yards, TD
- NYJ – Michael Carter – 15 rushes, 77 yards, TD

**Top receivers**

- CIN – Tee Higgins – 4 receptions, 97 yards
- NYJ – Michael Carter – 9 receptions, 95 yards

With the upset win, the Jets matched their 2-win total from the previous year. Quarterback Mike White, whom made his first career start in place of an injured Zach Wilson, became the first quarterback since Cam Newton to throw for 400+ yards in their first career start, and the first Jets quarterback to throw 400+ yards since Vinny Testaverde in 2000.

==== Week 9: at Indianapolis Colts ====
Week 9: New York Jets at Indianapolis Colts – Game summary

Quarter	1	2	3	4	Total
Jets	7	3	6	14	**30**
**Colts**	7	21	14	3	**45**

at Lucas Oil Stadium, Indianapolis, Indiana

- Date: November 4
- Game time: 8:20 p.m. EDT
- Game weather: None (retractable roof closed)
- Game attendance: 59,593
- Referee: John Hussey
- TV announcers (Fox/NFLN/Prime Video): Joe Buck, Troy Aikman, Erin Andrews and Kristina Pink
- Recap, Game Book

Game information

**First quarter**

- IND – Nyheim Hines 34-yard run (Michael Badgley kick), 6:55. Colts 7–0. **Drive: 8 plays, 88 yards, 4:48.**
- NYJ – Elijah Moore 19-yard pass from Mike White (Matt Ammendola kick), 3:32. Tied 7–7. **Drive: 8 plays, 75 yards, 3:23.**

**Second quarter**

- IND – Jonathan Taylor 21-yard run (Michael Badgley kick), 13:24. Colts 14–7. **Drive: 9 plays, 76 yards, 5:08.**
- IND – Jack Doyle 1-yard pass from Carson Wentz (Michael Badgley kick), 4:59. Colts 21–7. **Drive: 9 plays, 46 yards, 6:04.**
- NYJ – Matt Ammendola 33-yard field goal, 1:46. Colts 21–10. **Drive: 8 plays, 60 yards, 3:13.**
- IND – Michael Pittman Jr. 11-yard pass from Carson Wentz (Michael Badgley kick), 0:12. Colts 28–10. **Drive: 9 plays, 75 yards, 1:34.**

**Third quarter**

- IND – Danny Pinter 2-yard pass from Carson Wentz (Michael Badgley kick), 6:54. Colts 35–10. **Drive: 3 plays, 40 yards, 1:06.**
- IND – Jonathan Taylor 78-yard run (Michael Badgley kick), 6:02. Colts 42–10. **Drive: 1 play, 78 yards, 0:10.**
- NYJ – Elijah Moore 19-yard pass from Josh Johnson (run failed), 3:00. Colts 42–16. **Drive: 6 plays, 75 yards, 3:02.**

**Fourth quarter**

- NYJ – Ryan Griffin 13-yard pass from Josh Johnson (Matt Ammendola kick), 11:08. Colts 42–23. **Drive: 11 plays, 66 yards, 5:03.**
- IND – Michael Badgley 39-yard field goal, 8:01. Colts 45–23. **Drive: 7 plays, 54 yards, 3:07.**
- NYJ – Ty Johnson 22-yard pass from Josh Johnson (Matt Ammendola kick), 3:35. Colts 45–30. **Drive: 13 plays, 80 yards, 4:26.**

**Top passers**

- NYJ – Josh Johnson – 27/41, 317 yards, 3 TD, INT
- IND – Carson Wentz – 22/30, 272 yards, 3 TD

**Top rushers**

- NYJ – Michael Carter – 13 rushes, 49 yards
- IND – Jonathan Taylor – 19 rushes, 172 yards, 2 TD

**Top receivers**

- NYJ – Elijah Moore – 7 receptions, 84 yards,2 TD
- IND – Michael Pittman Jr. – 5 receptions, 64 yards, TD

Despite the loss, the Jets were given the minor comfort of participating in a game that made a scorigami — a 45–30 game had never happened before in NFL history.

==== Week 10: vs. Buffalo Bills ====
Week 10: Buffalo Bills at New York Jets – Game summary

Quarter	1	2	3	4	Total
**Bills**	10	7	21	7	**45**
Jets	0	3	0	14	**17**

at MetLife Stadium, East Rutherford, New Jersey

- Date: November 14
- Game time: 1:00 p.m. EST
- Game weather: Overcast and brisk, 48 °F (9 °C)
- Game attendance: 77,625
- Referee: Scott Novak
- TV announcers (CBS): Spero Dedes and Jay Feely
- Recap, Game Book

Game information

**First quarter**

- BUF – Matt Breida 15-yard pass from Josh Allen (Tyler Bass kick), 12:15. Bills 7–0. **Drive: 5 plays, 58 yards, 1:55.**
- BUF – Tyler Bass 29-yard field goal, 5:22. Bills 10–0. **Drive: 9 plays, 33 yards, 3:55.**

**Second quarter**

- NYJ – Matt Ammendola 48-yard field goal, 1:53. Bills 10–3. **Drive: 8 plays, 47 yards, 3:33.**
- BUF – Stefon Diggs 12-yard pass from Josh Allen (Tyler Bass kick), 0:53. Bills 17–3. **Drive: 5 plays, 75 yards, 1:00.**

**Third quarter**

- BUF – Isaiah McKenzie 8-yard run (Tyler Bass kick), 12:01. Bills 24–3. **Drive: 5 plays, 75 yards, 2:59.**
- BUF – Matt Breida 15-yard run (Tyler Bass kick), 10:47. Bills 31–3. **Drive: 2 plays, 64 yards, 1:00.**
- BUF – Zack Moss 1-yard run (Tyler Bass kick), 6:01. Bills 38–3. **Drive: 4 plays, 45 yards, 2:18.**

**Fourth quarter**

- NYJ – Michael Carter 1-yard run (Matt Ammendola kick), 11:58. Bills 38–10. **Drive: 11 plays, 35 yards, 3:34.**
- BUF – Devin Singletary 2-yard run (Tyler Bass kick), 5:52. Bills 45–10. **Drive: 4 plays, 57 yards, 2:18.**
- NYJ – Elijah Moore 15-yard pass from Joe Flacco (Matt Ammendola kick), 2:08. Bills 45–17. **Drive: 8 plays, 68 yards, 3:44.**

**Top passers**

- BUF – Josh Allen – 21/28, 366 yards, 2 TD, INT
- NYJ – Mike White – 24/44, 251 yards, 4 INT

**Top rushers**

- BUF – Devin Singletary – 7 rushes, 43 yards, TD
- NYJ – Michael Carter – 16 rushes, 39 yards, TD

**Top receivers**

- BUF – Stefon Diggs – 8 receptions, 162 yards, TD
- NYJ – Corey Davis – 5 receptions, 93 yards

With their 9th consecutive divisional loss, the Jets fell to 2-7. This would be their last home loss to the Bills until 2024.

==== Week 11: vs. Miami Dolphins ====
Week 11: Miami Dolphins at New York Jets – Game summary

Quarter	1	2	3	4	Total
**Dolphins**	7	0	7	10	**24**
Jets	7	0	7	3	**17**

at MetLife Stadium, East Rutherford, New Jersey

- Date: November 21
- Game time: 1:00 p.m. EST
- Game weather: Mostly sunny, 54 °F (12 °C)
- Game attendance: 72,303
- Referee: Alex Kemp
- TV announcers (CBS): Greg Gumbel, Adam Archuleta and AJ Ross
- Recap, Game Book

Game information

**First quarter**

- MIA – Jaylen Waddle 1-yard run (Jason Sanders kick), 9:04. Dolphins 7–0. **Drive: 11 plays, 83 yards, 5:56.**
- NYJ – Jamison Crowder 2-yard pass from Joe Flacco (Matt Ammendola kick), 3:00. Tied 7–7. **Drive: 5 plays, 40 yards, 1:43.**

**Second quarter**

- No scoring plays.

**Third quarter**

- MIA – Mack Hollins 65-yard pass from Tua Tagovailoa (Jason Sanders kick), 9:06. Dolphins 14–0. **Drive: 4 plays, 90 yards, 2:13.**
- NYJ – Elijah Moore 62-yard pass from Joe Flacco (Matt Ammendola kick), 2:59. Tied 14–14. **Drive: 3 plays, 64 yards, 0:50.**

**Fourth quarter**

- MIA – Myles Gaskin 5-yard pass from Tua Tagovailoa (Jason Sanders kick), 10:15. Dolphins 21–14. **Drive: 14 plays, 75 yards, 7:44.**
- MIA – Jason Sanders 24-yard field goal, 1:57. Dolphins 24–14. **Drive: 12 plays, 45 yards, 6:53.**
- NYJ – Matt Ammendola 35-yard field goal, 0:15. Dolphins 24–17. **Drive: 8 plays, 54 yards, 1:42.**

**Top passers**

- MIA – Tua Tagovailoa – 27/33, 273 yards, 2 TD, INT
- NYJ – Joe Flacco – 24/39, 291 yards, 2 TD

**Top rushers**

- MIA – Myles Gaskin – 23 rushes, 89 yards
- NYJ – Michael Carter – 9 rushes, 63 yards

**Top receivers**

- MIA – Mack Hollins – 2 receptions, 72 yards, TD
- NYJ – Elijah Moore – 8 receptions, 141 yards, TD

==== Week 12: at Houston Texans ====
Week 12: New York Jets at Houston Texans – Game summary

Quarter	1	2	3	4	Total
**Jets**	3	8	7	3	**21**
Texans	0	14	0	0	**14**

at NRG Stadium, Houston, Texas

- Date: November 28
- Game time: 1:00 p.m. EST/12:00 p.m. CST
- Game weather: None (retractable roof closed)
- Game attendance: 65,120
- Referee: Clete Blakeman
- TV announcers (CBS): Spero Dedes, Jay Feely and Amanda Balionis
- Recap, Game Book

Game information

**First quarter**

- NYJ – Matt Ammendola 31-yard field goal, 5:34. Jets 3–0. **Drive: 7 plays, 24 yards, 3:28.**

**Second quarter**

- HOU – Brevin Jordan 13-yard pass from Tyrod Taylor (Kaʻimi Fairbairn kick), 14:18. Texans 7–3. **Drive: 5 plays, 24 yards, 2:47.**
- HOU – Brandin Cooks 40-yard pass from Tyrod Taylor (Kaʻimi Fairbairn kick), 10:29. Texans 14–3. **Drive: 6 plays, 67 yards, 2:47.**
- NYJ – Austin Walter 2-yard run (Josh Johnson run), 1:13. Texans 14–11. **Drive: 10 plays, 70 yards, 5:19.**

**Third quarter**

- NYJ – Zach Wilson 4-yard run (Matt Ammendola kick), 7:51. Jets 18–14. **Drive: 11 plays, 75 yards, 7:09.**

**Fourth quarter**

- NYJ – Matt Ammendola 37-yard field goal, 3:34. Jets 21–14. **Drive: 13 plays, 36 yards, 6:20.**

**Top passers**

- NYJ – Zach Wilson – 14/24, 145 yards, INT
- HOU – Tyrod Taylor – 17/26, 158 yards, 2 TD, INT

**Top rushers**

- NYJ – Tevin Coleman – 16 rushes, 67 yards
- HOU – David Johnson – 10 rushes, 39 yards

**Top receivers**

- NYJ – Braxton Berrios – 2 receptions, 47 yards
- HOU – Brandin Cooks – 3 receptions, 45 yards, TD

==== Week 13: vs. Philadelphia Eagles ====
Week 13: Philadelphia Eagles at New York Jets – Game summary

Quarter	1	2	3	4	Total
**Eagles**	7	17	3	6	**33**
Jets	12	6	0	0	**18**

at MetLife Stadium, East Rutherford, New Jersey

- Date: December 5
- Game time: 1:00 p.m. EST
- Game weather: Mostly sunny, 47 °F (8 °C)
- Game attendance: 73,311
- Referee: Clay Martin
- TV announcers (CBS): Andrew Catalon, James Lofton and Amanda Balionis
- Recap, Game Book

Game information

**First quarter**

- NYJ – Elijah Moore 3-yard pass from Zach Wilson (kick failed), 12:42. Jets 6–0. **Drive: 5 plays, 21 yards, 2:18.**
- PHI – Dallas Goedert 36-yard pass from Gardner Minshew (Jake Elliott kick), 9:25. Eagles 7–6. **Drive: 6 plays, 75 yards, 3:17.**
- NYJ – Zach Wilson 1-yard run (kick failed), 3:18. Jets 12–7. **Drive: 11 plays, 68 yards, 6:07.**

**Second quarter**

- PHI – Dallas Goedert 25-yard pass from Gardner Minshew (Jake Elliott kick), 14:12. Eagles 14–12. **Drive: 8 plays, 69 yards, 4:06.**
- NYJ – Ryan Griffin 1-yard pass from Zach Wilson (pass failed), 9:22. Jets 18–14. **Drive: 9 plays, 75 yards, 4:50.**
- PHI – Kenneth Gainwell 18-yard run (Jake Elliott kick), 4:30. Eagles 21–18. **Drive: 8 plays, 94 yards, 4:52.**
- PHI – Jake Elliott 31-yard field goal, 0:19. Eagles 24–18. **Drive: 10 plays, 34 yards, 1:51.**

**Third quarter**

- PHI – Jake Elliott 32-yard field goal, 6:38. Eagles 27–18. **Drive: 14 plays, 70 yards, 8:22.**

**Fourth quarter**

- PHI – Jake Elliott 43-yard field goal, 14:15. Eagles 30–18. **Drive: 13 plays, 41 yards, 6:13.**
- PHI – Jake Elliott 46-yard field goal, 9:42. Eagles 33–18. **Drive: 6 plays, 48 yards, 3:20.**

**Top passers**

- PHI – Gardner Minshew – 20/25, 242 yards, 2 TD
- NYJ – Zach Wilson – 23/38, 226 yards, 2 TD, INT

**Top rushers**

- PHI – Miles Sanders – 24 rushes, 120 yards
- NYJ – Tevin Coleman – 11 rushes, 58 yards

**Top receivers**

- PHI – Dallas Goedert – 6 receptions, 105 yards, 2 TD
- NYJ – Elijah Moore – 6 receptions, 77 yards, TD

The Jets dropped to 0–12 all time against the Eagles.

==== Week 14: vs. New Orleans Saints ====
Week 14: New Orleans Saints at New York Jets – Game summary

Quarter	1	2	3	4	Total
**Saints**	3	7	3	17	**30**
Jets	0	6	0	3	**9**

at MetLife Stadium, East Rutherford, New Jersey

- Date: December 12
- Game time: 1:00 p.m. EST
- Game weather: Sunny, 48 °F (9 °C)
- Game attendance: 69,129
- Referee: Land Clark
- TV announcers (CBS): Andrew Catalon, James Lofton and Sherree Burruss
- Recap, Game Book

Game information

**First quarter**

- NO – Brett Maher 23-yard field goal, 6:37. Saints 3–0. **Drive: 14 plays, 65 yards, 7:24.**

**Second quarter**

- NYJ – Eddy Piñeiro 36-yard field goal, 10:01. Tied 3–3. **Drive: 9 plays, 38 yards, 3:10.**
- NO – Alvin Kamara 16-yard run (Brett Maher kick), 3:42. Saints 10–3. **Drive: 6 plays, 54 yards, 3:13.**
- NYJ – Eddy Piñeiro 46-yard field goal, 0:00. Saints 10–6. **Drive: 10 plays, 47 yards, 3:42.**

**Third quarter**

- NO – Brett Maher 31-yard field goal, 0:58. Saints 13–6. **Drive: 15 plays, 80 yards, 9:01.**

**Fourth quarter**

- NO – Brett Maher 37-yard field goal, 12:22. Saints 16–6. **Drive: 7 plays, 31 yards, 2:38.**
- NO – Taysom Hill 2-yard run (Brett Maher kick), 5:28. Saints 23–6. **Drive: 8 plays, 51 yards, 4:46.**
- NYJ – Eddy Piñeiro 36-yard field goal, 3:29. Saints 23–9. **Drive: 10 plays, 53 yards, 1:59.**
- NO – Taysom Hill 44-yard run (Brett Maher kick), 1:07. Saints 30–9. **Drive: 3 plays, 42 yards, 1:32.**

**Top passers**

- NO – Taysom Hill – 15/21, 175 yards
- NYJ – Zach Wilson – 19/42, 202 yards

**Top rushers**

- NO – Alvin Kamara – 27 rushes, 120 yards, TD
- NYJ – Zach Wilson – 4 rushes, 33 yards

**Top receivers**

- NO – Nick Vannett – 3 receptions, 44 yards
- NYJ – Braxton Berrios – 6 receptions, 52 yards

With the loss, the Jets fell to 0-3 against the NFC South and they were eliminated from playoff contention for the 11th consecutive season, tying the Jets teams from 1970-1980 for most consecutive seasons missing the playoffs.

==== Week 15: at Miami Dolphins ====
Week 15: New York Jets at Miami Dolphins – Game summary

Quarter	1	2	3	4	Total
Jets	10	7	0	7	**24**
**Dolphins**	0	10	7	14	**31**

at Hard Rock Stadium, Miami Gardens, Florida

- Date: December 19
- Game time: 1:00 p.m. EST
- Game weather: Partly sunny, 79 °F (26 °C)
- Game attendance: 66,035
- Referee: Ronald Torbert
- TV announcers (CBS): Greg Gumbel, Adam Archuleta and AJ Ross
- Recap, Game Book

Game information

**First quarter**

- NYJ – Braxton Berrios 2-yard run (Eddy Pineiro kick), 7:02. Jets 7–0. **Drive: 10 plays, 83 yards, 6:04.**
- NYJ – Eddy Pineiro 27-yard field goal, 4:30. Jets 10–0. **Drive: 6 plays, 16 yards, 2:19.**

**Second quarter**

- MIA – Duke Johnson 1-yard run (Jason Sanders kick), 13:42. Jets 10–7. **Drive: 8 plays, 68 yards, 4:01.**
- NYJ – Zach Wilson 1-yard run (Eddy Pineiro kick), 9:29. Jets 17–7. **Drive: 8 plays, 75 yards, 4:13.**
- MIA – Jason Sanders 24-yard field goal, 1:59. Jets 17–10. **Drive: 14 plays, 69 yards, 7:30.**

**Third quarter**

- MIA – Duke Johnson 2-yard run (Jason Sanders kick), 9:44. Tied 17–17. **Drive: 8 plays, 78 yards, 3:36.**

**Fourth quarter**

- MIA – Christian Wilkins 1-yard pass from Tua Tagovailoa (Jason Sanders kick), 14:23. Dolphins 24–17. **Drive: 12 plays, 58 yards, 6:35.**
- NYJ – Brandin Echols 20-yard interception return (Eddy Pineiro kick), 7:45. Tied 24–24.
- MIA – DeVante Parker 11-yard pass from Tua Tagovailoa (Jason Sanders kick), 3:37. Dolphins 31–24. **Drive: 9 plays, 75 yards, 4:08.**

**Top passers**

- NYJ – Zach Wilson – 13/23, 170 yards
- MIA – Tua Tagovailoa – 16/27, 196 yards, 2 TD, 2 INT

**Top rushers**

- NYJ – Tevin Coleman – 8 rushes, 50 yards
- MIA – Duke Johnson – 22 rushes, 107 yards, 2 TD

**Top receivers**

- NYJ – Jamison Crowder – 5 receptions, 40 yards
- MIA – DeVante Parker – 4 receptions, 68 yards, TD

With their 7th loss in Miami since 2016, the Jets fell to 3-11.

==== Week 16: vs. Jacksonville Jaguars ====
Week 16: Jacksonville Jaguars at New York Jets – Game summary

Quarter	1	2	3	4	Total
Jaguars	3	9	3	6	**21**
**Jets**	6	7	3	10	**26**

at MetLife Stadium, East Rutherford, New Jersey

- Date: December 26
- Game time: 1:00 p.m. EST
- Game weather: Sunny, 48 °F (9 °C)
- Game attendance: 67,120
- Referee: Tony Corrente
- TV announcers (CBS): Spero Dedes and Jay Feely
- Recap, Game Book

Game information

**First quarter**

- JAX – Matthew Wright 21-yard field goal, 8:12. Jaguars 3–0. **Drive: 12 plays, 73 yards, 6:48.**
- NYJ – Zach Wilson 52-yard run (Eddy Piñeiro kick blocked), 3:54. Jets 6–3. **Drive: 8 plays, 91 yards, 4:18.**

**Second quarter**

- JAX – Will Richardson fumble recovery in the end zone (run failed), 13:08. Jaguars 9–6. **Drive: 12 plays, 75 yards, 5:46.**
- NYJ – Braxton Berrios 102-yard kick return (Eddy Piñeiro kick), 12:57. Jets 13–9.
- JAX – Matthew Wright 45-yard field goal, 8:15. Jets 13–12. **Drive: 11 plays, 48 yards, 4:42.**

**Third quarter**

- NYJ – Eddy Piñeiro 42-yard field goal, 9:47. Jets 16–12. **Drive: 9 plays, 48 yards, 5:13.**
- JAX – Matthew Wright 40-yard field goal, 0:25. Jets 16–15. **Drive: 10 plays, 75 yards, 4:39.**

**Fourth quarter**

- NYJ – Conor McDermott 1-yard pass from Zach Wilson (Eddy Piñeiro kick), 9:16. Jets 23–15. **Drive: 11 plays, 80 yards, 6:09.**
- JAX – Dare Ogunbowale 1-yard run (pass failed), 5:25. Jets 23–21. **Drive: 8 plays, 75 yards, 3:51.**
- NYJ – Eddy Piñeiro 20-yard field goal, 1:47. Jets 26–21. **Drive: 10 plays, 67 yards, 3:38.**

**Top passers**

- JAX – Trevor Lawrence – 26/39, 280 yards
- NYJ – Zach Wilson – 14/22, 102 yards, TD

**Top rushers**

- JAX – Dare Ogunbowale – 17 rushes, 57 yards, TD
- NYJ – Michael Carter – 16 rushes, 118 yards

**Top receivers**

- JAX – Marvin Jones – 8 receptions, 74 yards
- NYJ – Braxton Berrios – 5 receptions, 37 yards

With the win, the Jets improved to 4-11 and finished 3-1 against the AFC South.

==== Week 17: vs. Tampa Bay Buccaneers ====
Week 17: Tampa Bay Buccaneers at New York Jets – Game summary

Quarter	1	2	3	4	Total
**Buccaneers**	7	3	7	11	**28**
Jets	7	10	7	0	**24**

at MetLife Stadium, East Rutherford, New Jersey

- Date: January 2
- Game time: 1:00 p.m. EST
- Game weather: Cloudy, 57 °F (14 °C)
- Game attendance: 72,243
- Referee: Alex Kemp
- TV announcers (Fox): Chris Myers, Daryl Johnston and Jen Hale
- Recap, Game Book

Game information

**First quarter**

- NYJ – Braxton Berrios 1-yard run (Eddy Pineiro kick), 12:04. Jets 7–0. **Drive: 6 plays, 72 yards, 2:56.**
- TB – Mike Evans 4-yard pass from Tom Brady (Ryan Succop kick), 5:43. Tied 7–7. **Drive: 13 plays, 75 yards, 6:21.**

**Second quarter**

- NYJ – Braxton Berrios 9-yard pass from Zach Wilson (Eddy Pineiro kick), 13:43. Jets 14–7. **Drive: 13 plays, 74 yards, 7:00.**
- TB – Ryan Succop 39-yard field goal, 10:50. Jets 14–10. **Drive: 7 plays, 54 yards, 2:53.**
- NYJ – Eddy Pineiro 51-yard field goal, 0:01. Jets 17–10. **Drive: 3 plays, 19 yards, 0:15.**

**Third quarter**

- NYJ – Ty Johnson 1-yard run (Eddy Pineiro kick), 6:56. Jets 24–10. **Drive: 9 plays, 66 yards, 5:12.**
- TB – Cameron Brate 4-yard pass from Tom Brady (Ryan Succop kick), 0:29. Jets 24–17. **Drive: 13 plays, 75 yards, 6:27.**

**Fourth quarter**

- TB – Ryan Succop 27-yard field goal, 7:36. Jets 24–20. **Drive: 8 plays, 38 yards, 3:39.**
- TB – Cyril Grayson 33-yard pass from Tom Brady (Le'Veon Bell run), 0:15. Buccaneers 28–24. **Drive: 9 plays, 93 yards, 1:57.**

**Top passers**

- TB – Tom Brady – 34/50, 410 yards, 3 TD, INT
- NYJ – Zach Wilson – 19/33, 234 yards, TD

**Top rushers**

- TB – Ke'Shawn Vaughn – 8 rushes, 31 yards
- NYJ – Michael Carter – 3 rushes, 54 yards

**Top receivers**

- TB – Rob Gronkowski – 7 receptions, 115 yards
- NYJ – Braxton Berrios – 8 receptions, 65 yards, TD

In what would turn out to be their final game against Tom Brady, the Jets squandered a 24-17 lead and get outscored 11-0 in the 4th quarter. As result the Jets dropped to 4-12 and finished 0-5 against the NFC.

The Jets recorded their first-ever home loss to the Buccaneers, snapping a seven-game home winning streak against them.

==== Week 18: at Buffalo Bills ====
Week 18: New York Jets at Buffalo Bills – Game summary

Quarter	1	2	3	4	Total
Jets	0	7	3	0	**10**
**Bills**	10	3	0	14	**27**

at Highmark Stadium, Orchard Park, New York

- Date: January 9
- Game time: 4:25 p.m. EST
- Game weather: Snow showers, 34 °F (1 °C)
- Game attendance: 64,783
- Referee: John Hussey
- TV announcers (CBS): Kevin Harlan, Trent Green and Melanie Collins
- Recap, Game Book

Game information

**First quarter**

- BUF – Stefon Diggs 10-yard pass from Josh Allen (Tyler Bass kick), 10:42. Bills 7–0. **Drive: 7 plays, 75 yards, 4:18.**
- BUF – Tyler Bass 41-yard field goal, 2:31. Bills 10–0. **Drive: 13 plays, 70 yards, 6:29.**

**Second quarter**

- NYJ – Keelan Cole 40-yard pass from Zach Wilson (Eddy Piñeiro kick), 3:51. Bills 10–7. **Drive: 4 plays, 45 yards, 1:31.**
- BUF – Tyler Bass 21-yard field goal, 0:00. Bills 13–7. **Drive: 10 plays, 81 yards, 1:39.**

**Third quarter**

- NYJ – Eddy Piñeiro 49-yard field goal, 3:55. Bills 13–10. **Drive: 4 plays, −9 yards, 1:31.**

**Fourth quarter**

- BUF – Devin Singletary 1-yard run (Tyler Bass kick), 8:21. Bills 20–10. **Drive: 7 plays, 51 yards, 4:12.**
- BUF – Devin Singletary 5-yard pass from Josh Allen (Tyler Bass kick), 3:53. Bills 27–10. **Drive: 7 plays, 48 yards, 3:31.**

**Top passers**

- NYJ – Zach Wilson – 7/20, 87 yards, TD
- BUF – Josh Allen – 24/45, 239 yards, 2 TD

**Top rushers**

- NYJ – Zach Wilson – 2 rushes, 24 yards
- BUF – Devin Singletary – 19 rushes, 88 yards, TD

**Top receivers**

- NYJ – Keelan Cole – 3 receptions, 54 yards, TD
- BUF – Stefon Diggs – 9 receptions, 81 yards, TD

For the second straight season, the Jets failed to win a divisional game as they finished 4-13. This was the Jets last season without a divisional win until 2025.

=== Standings ===
==== Division ====
AFC East
	W	L	T	PCT	DIV	CONF	PF	PA	STK
^{(3)} Buffalo Bills	11	6	0	.647	5–1	7–5	483	289	W4
^{(6)} New England Patriots	10	7	0	.588	3–3	8–4	462	303	L1
Miami Dolphins	9	8	0	.529	4–2	6–6	341	373	W1
New York Jets	4	13	0	.235	0–6	4–8	310	504	L2

==== Conference ====
AFC
#	Team	Division	W	L	T	PCT	DIV	CONF	SOS	SOV	STK
**Division winners**
1 (Note: Tennessee finished ahead of Kansas City based on head-to-head victory, claiming the No. 1 seed.)	Tennessee Titans	South	12	5	0	.706	5–1	8–4	.472	.480	W3
2	Kansas City Chiefs	West	12	5	0	.706	5–1	7–5	.538	.517	W1
3	Buffalo Bills	East	11	6	0	.647	5–1	7–5	.472	.428	W4
4	Cincinnati Bengals	North	10	7	0	.588	4–2	8–4	.472	.462	L1
**Wild cards**
5 (Note: Las Vegas claimed the No. 5 seed over New England based on win percentage in common games (5–1 vs. 2–4 against: Miami, Dallas, LA Chargers, Cleveland, and Indianapolis).)	Las Vegas Raiders	West	10	7	0	.588	3–3	8–4	.510	.515	W4
6	New England Patriots	East	10	7	0	.588	3–3	8–4	.481	.394	L1
7	Pittsburgh Steelers	North	9	7	1	.559	4–2	7–5	.521	.490	W2
**Did not qualify for the postseason**
8 (Note: Indianapolis finished ahead of Miami and Los Angeles based on conference record (7–5 vs. 6–6).)	Indianapolis Colts	South	9	8	0	.529	3–3	7–5	.495	.431	L2
9 (Note: Miami finished ahead of LA Chargers based on win percentage in common games (5–1 vs. 2–4 against: New England, Las Vegas, Houston, Baltimore, and NY Giants).)	Miami Dolphins	East	9	8	0	.529	4–2	6–6	.464	.379	W1
10	Los Angeles Chargers	West	9	8	0	.529	3–3	6–6	.510	.500	L1
11 (Note: Cleveland finished ahead of Baltimore based on division record (3–3 vs. 1–5).)	Cleveland Browns	North	8	9	0	.471	3–3	5–7	.514	.415	W1
12	Baltimore Ravens	North	8	9	0	.471	1–5	5–7	.531	.460	L6
13	Denver Broncos	West	7	10	0	.412	1–5	3–9	.484	.357	L4
14 (Note: NY Jets finished ahead of Houston based on head-to-head victory.)	New York Jets	East	4	13	0	.235	0–6	4–8	.512	.426	L2
15	Houston Texans	South	4	13	0	.235	3–3	4–8	.498	.397	L2
16	Jacksonville Jaguars	South	3	14	0	.176	1–5	3–9	.512	.569	W1
**Tiebreakers** (Note: When breaking ties for three or more teams under the NFL's rules, they are first broken within divisions, then comparing only the highest-ranked remaining team from each division.)
