= Jason Pinnock =

American football player (born 1999)

No. 25 – New York Giants
- Position: Safety
- Roster status: Active

Personal information
- Born: June 30, 1999 (age 27); Windsor, Connecticut, U.S.
- Listed height: 6 ft 0 in (1.83 m)
- Listed weight: 200 lb (91 kg)

Career information
- High school: Windsor (CT)
- College: Pittsburgh (2017–2020)
- NFL draft: 2021: 5th round, 175th overall pick

Career history
- New York Jets (2021); New York Giants (2022–2024); San Francisco 49ers (2025); New York Giants (2026–present)

Career NFL statistics as of 2025
- Total tackles: 268
- Sacks: 6.5
- Pass deflections: 11
- Interceptions: 2
- Forced fumbles: 5
- Fumble recoveries: 1
- Defensive touchdowns: 1
- Stats at Pro Football Reference

Jason Alexander Pinnock (born June 30, 1999) is an American professional football safety for the New York Giants of the National Football League (NFL). He played college football for the Pittsburgh Panthers.

== Professional career ==
Pre-draft measurables
Height	Weight	Arm length	Hand span	Wingspan	40-yard dash	10-yard split	20-yard split	20-yard shuttle	Three-cone drill	Vertical jump	Broad jump	Bench press
6 ft 0 1/2 in (1.84 m)	204 lb (93 kg)	32 3/8 in (0.82 m)	9 1/8 in (0.23 m)	6 ft 6 1/4 in (1.99 m)	4.49 s	1.46 s	2.61 s	4.10 s	6.90 s	39.5 in (1.00 m)	10 ft 8 in (3.25 m)	15 reps
All values from Pro Day

=== New York Jets ===
The New York Jets selected Pinnock in the fifth round (175th overall) of the 2021 NFL draft. He was the 25th cornerback selected in the 2021 NFL draft and was the second of three cornerbacks the Jets drafted, along with fifth-round pick (154th overall) Michael Carter II and sixth-round pick (200th overall) Brandin Echols.

External videos
- NY Jets select Jason Pinnock No. 175

On May 7, 2021, the Jets signed Pinnock to a four–year, $3.75 million rookie contract that includes a signing bonus of $270,451.

Throughout training camp, he competed for a roster spot as a backup cornerback and special teams player against Isaiah Dunn, Brandin Echols, Javelin Guidry, Lamar Jackson, Michael Carter II, and Elijah Campbell. Head coach Robert Saleh named him a backup and listed him as the seventh cornerback on the depth chart to begin the season, behind Bryce Hall, Brandin Echols, Michael Carter II, Javelin Guidry, Justin Hardee, and Isaiah Dunn.

He was inactive as a healthy scratch for the first two games (Weeks 1–2) of the season. On September 26, 2021, Pinnock made his professional regular season debut, but was limited to four snaps on special teams as the Jets lost 0–26 at the Denver Broncos. By Week 11, Pinnock became the fourth cornerback on the depth chart and began receiving snaps on defense after Brandin Echols suffered a thigh injury and was inactive for three games (Weeks 11–13). In Week 16, Pinnock earned his first career start as the starting nickelback and made four combined tackles (two solo) and one pass deflection during a 26–21 victory against the Jacksonville Jaguars. On January 9, 2021, Pinnock earned his first career start as a safety after the Jets were depleted at the safety position after Elijah Riley was placed in concussion protocol and Ashtyn Davis and Sharrod Neasman were placed on the COVID-19/reserve list. He performed well in their absence and set a season-high with six combined tackles (four solo) and forced a fumble as the Jets lost 10–27 at the Buffalo Bills. He finished his rookie season with a total 16 combined tackles (10 solo), two forced fumbles, and one pass deflection in 12 games and two starts.

He entered training camp on the roster bubble after the New York Jets selected Sauce Gardner fourth overall in the 2022 NFL draft. Defensive coordinator Jeff Ulbrich chose to have Pinnock transition to play the safety position. The job as the starting strong safety was available after Marcus Maye departed during free agency. Throughout training camp, Pinnock competed for the role against Ashtyn Davis, Lamarcus Joyner, Will Parks, and Tony Adams. On August 30, 2022, the Jets unexpectedly waived Pinnock as part of their final roster cuts.

=== New York Giants (first stint) ===
==== 2022 ====
On August 31, 2022, the New York Giants claimed Pinnock off waivers. Head coach Brian Daboll named Pinnock a backup safety to begin the season, behind Xavier McKinney, Julian Love, and Tony Jefferson. He earned the position over Nate Meadors and Trenton Thompson and played under defensive coordinator Don Martindale.

He was inactive for the Giants' 19–16 victory against the Carolina Panthers in Week 2 due to a shoulder injury. He was also inactive for two games (Weeks 5–6) after suffering an ankle injury. Pinnock did not start receiving snaps on defense until Week 10 due to Xavier McKinney suffering a broken hand and Tony Jefferson being placed on injured reserve due to a foot injury. In Week 10, he made four combined tackles (three solo) and 1.5 sacks during a 16–24 victory against the Houston Texans. He had his first career sack alongside teammate Dexter Lawrence on quarterback Davis Mills for a 12–yard loss and made his first solo sack on Mills for nine-yard loss in the third quarter. In Week 14, he earned his first start with the Giants at safety and set a season-high with nine combined tackles (eight solo) during a 22–48 loss against the Philadelphia Eagles. The following week, he had five combined tackles (four solo), set a season-high with two pass deflections, and forced a fumble during a 20–12 victory at the Washington Commanders in Week 15. He finished the season with 41 combined tackles (34 solo), 1.5 sacks, three pass deflections, a forced fumble, and a fumble recovery in 14 games and five starts. He received an overall grade of 61.3 from Pro Football Focus in 2023.

==== 2023 ====
He entered training camp as a possible candidate to earn the role as the starting strong safety after it was left vacant following the departure of Julian Love in free agency. Defensive coordinator Don Martindale had Pinnock compete against Dane Belton and Bobby McCain. Head coach Brian Daboll named him the starting strong safety to begin the season and paired him with Xavier McKinney.

In Week 2, he set a new career-high with 13 combined tackles (ten solo) during a 31–28 victory at the Arizona Cardinals. On October 8, 2023, Pinnock made four solo tackles, one pass deflection, and returned his first career interception for a touchdown during a 16–31 loss at the Miami Dolphins. His pick-six was on an interception thrown by Tua Tagovailoa in the endzone to wide receiver Jaylen Waddle and he returned it for 102–yards to score the first touchdown of his career in the second quarter. In Week 14, Pinnock had four solo tackles, set a season-high with two pass deflections, and intercepted a pass by Jordan Love to wide receiver Dontayvion Wicks during a 22–24 victory against the Green Bay Packers. He was inactive during a 27–10 victory against the Philadelphia Eagles in Week 18 due to a foot injury. He finished the season with 85 combined tackles (59 solo), six pass deflections, two forced fumbles, two sacks, and two interceptions in 16 games and 16 starts. He received an overall grade of 67.7 from Pro Football Focus in 2023.

==== 2024 ====
On February 6, 2024, the New York Giants hired Tennessee Titans' defensive coordinator Shane Bowen to replace Don Martindale at defensive coordinator following his departure. Pinnock entered training camp slated as the starting free safety after Xavier McKinney departed for the Green Bay Packers in free agency. He was named the starting free safety to begin the season and was paired with rookie Tyler Nubin.

On September 15, 2024, Pinnock had nine combined tackles (eight solo) and set a new career-high with two sacks on Jayden Daniels during a 18–21 loss at the Washington Commanders. He was inactive for the Giants' 17–20 overtime loss at the Carolina Panthers in Week 10 after injuring his abdomen. In Week 17, he set a season-high with ten combined tackles (seven solo) as the Giants defeated the Indianapolis Colts 45–33. He finished the season with a total of 85 combined tackles (50 solo), a career-high three sacks, and had one pass deflection in 16 games and 16 starts. He received an overall grade of 54.5 from Pro Football Focus, which ranked 131st among 171 qualifying safeties in 2024.

=== San Francisco 49ers ===
On March 13, 2025, the San Francisco 49ers signed Pinnock to a fully-guaranteed one–year, $2.20 million contract that includes an initial signing bonus of $980,000.

=== New York Giants (second stint) ===
On March 16, 2026, Pinnock signed a one-year, $1.25 million contract to return to the New York Giants.

== NFL career statistics ==
Legend
**Bold**	Career high

=== Regular season ===
Year	Team	Games		Tackles					Interceptions						Fumbles				
Year	Team	GP	GS	Cmb	Solo	Ast	Sck	TFL	Int	Yds	Avg	Lng	TD	PD	FF	Fum	FR	Yds	TD
2021	NYJ	12	2	16	10	6	0.0	0	0	0	0.0	0	0	1	**2**	0	0	0	0
2022	NYG	14	5	41	34	7	1.5	2	0	0	0.0	0	0	3	1	**1**	**1**	0	0
2023	NYG	16	**16**	**85**	**59**	26	2.0	**6**	**2**	**123**	**61.5**	**102**	**1**	**6**	**2**	0	0	0	0
2024	NYG	16	**16**	**85**	50	**35**	**3.0**	4	0	0	0.0	0	0	1	0	0	0	0	0
2025	SF	**17**	7	41	27	14	0.0	1	0	0	0.0	0	0	0	0	0	0	0	0
Career		75	46	268	180	88	6.5	13	2	123	61.5	102	1	11	5	1	1	0	0

=== Postseason ===
Year	Team	Games		Tackles					Interceptions						Fumbles				
Year	Team	GP	GS	Cmb	Solo	Ast	Sck	TFL	Int	Yds	Avg	Lng	TD	PD	FF	Fum	FR	Yds	TD
2022	NYG	**2**	0	**2**	**1**	**1**	0.0	0	0	0	0.0	0	0	0	0	0	0	0	0
2025	SF	**2**	0	1	**1**	0	0.0	0	0	0	0.0	0	0	0	0	0	0	0	0
Career		4	0	3	2	1	0.0	0	0	0	0.0	0	0	0	0	0	0	0	0
