= Michael Carter II =

American football player (born 1999)

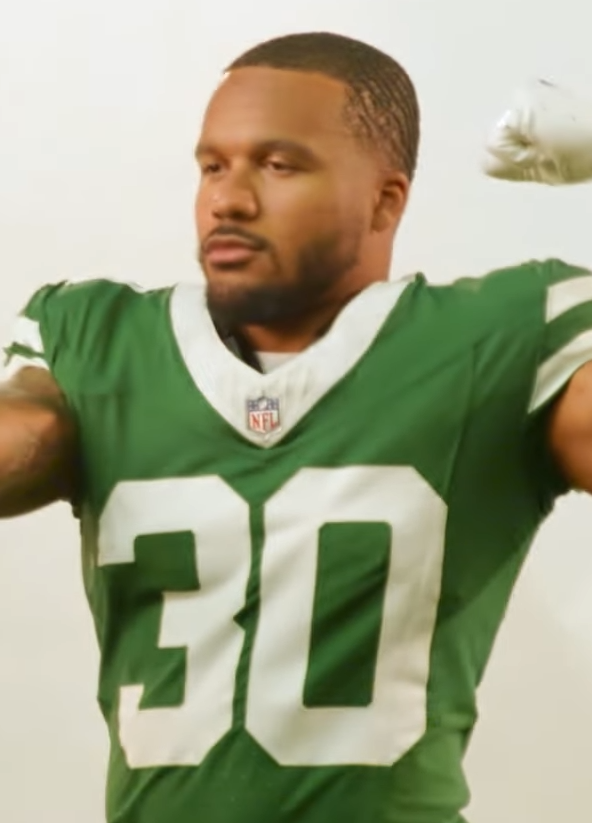
- Carter with the New York Jets in 2025

No. 35 – Philadelphia Eagles
- Positions: Nickelback, safety
- Roster status: Active

Personal information
- Born: March 8, 1999 (age 27); Douglasville, Georgia, U.S.
- Listed height: 5 ft 10 in (1.78 m)
- Listed weight: 184 lb (83 kg)

Career information
- High school: South Paulding (Douglasville)
- College: Duke (2017–2020)
- NFL draft: 2021: 5th round, 154th overall pick

Career history
- New York Jets (2021–2025); Philadelphia Eagles (2025–present)

Career NFL statistics as of Week 5, 2026
- Total tackles: 248
- Sacks: 1
- Forced fumbles: 1
- Fumble recoveries: 3
- Interceptions: 2
- Pass deflections: 29
- Stats at Pro Football Reference

Michael Carter II (born March 8, 1999) is an American professional football safety for the Philadelphia Eagles of the National Football League (NFL). He played college football for the Duke Blue Devils and was selected by the New York Jets in the fifth round of the 2021 NFL draft.

== College career ==
Carter was ranked as a three–star recruit by 247Sports.com coming out of high school. He committed to Duke on July 4, 2016.

== Professional career ==
=== Pre-draft ===
Bleacher Report ranked Carter as the 34th best cornerback prospect in the draft. NFL draft analysts projected him to be selected anywhere from the fifth to the seventh round of the 2021 NFL Draft. NFL.com analyst Lance Zierlein projected Carter to be a fifth-round pick.

Pre-draft measurables
Height	Weight	Arm length	Hand span	Wingspan	40-yard dash	10-yard split	20-yard split	20-yard shuttle	Three-cone drill	Vertical jump	Bench press
5 ft 9 5/8 in (1.77 m)	184 lb (83 kg)	29 1/8 in (0.74 m)	9 1/2 in (0.24 m)	6 ft 0 3/4 in (1.85 m)	4.36 s	1.51 s	2.56 s	4.44 s	6.90 s	35.5 in (0.90 m)	13 reps
All values from Pro Day

=== New York Jets ===
==== 2021 ====
The New York Jets selected Carter in the fifth round (154th overall) of the 2021 NFL draft, a pick they previously acquired as part of a trade that sent Leonard Williams to the New York Giants. Coincidentally, the Jets drafted another Michael Carter from rival school North Carolina in the fourth round of the draft earlier that day. He was the first of three cornerbacks the Jets drafted in 2021.

"I’ll tell you what I like about Michael Carter. The versatility. Without a doubt, character has to play into it. He’s a quality young man. He has decent size, 5-foot-11, 190. I think he’s got a lot of attributes you’re looking for. You want guys like that in your locker room. You want leaders like that. You want men like that. I think he’s a draftable player. I think he’ll be on a roster next year. He’s a guy who can contribute on special teams. At the very least, he’s a practice squad guy who makes his way onto the roster.”

— Jim Mora (Former NFL head coach)

External videos
- Jets draft Michael Carter II No. 154

On May 7, 2021, the New York Jets signed Carter to a four–year, $3.80 million rookie contract that included an initial signing bonus of $328,927. Throughout training camp, he competed against Bryce Hall, Blessuan Austin, Javelin Guidry, Jason Pinnock, Isaiah Dunn, and Brandin Echols to be a starting cornerback and was the favorite to win the role as the starting nickelback with Javelin Guidry as his top competition. Head coach Robert Saleh named Carter as the third cornerback and starting nickelback, with Echols and Hall starting outside.

On September 12, 2021, Carter made his professional regular season debut in the New York Jets' season-opener at the Carolina Panthers and made five combined tackles (two solo) during a 14–19 loss. In Week 3, Carter earned his first career start, starting at nickelback, and recorded six combined tackles (two solo) during a 0–26 loss at the Denver Broncos. On December 5, 2021, he recorded two combined tackles (one solo) before exiting in the third quarter of a 18–33 loss against the Philadelphia Eagles in order to be evaluated for a possible concussion. He was officially diagnosed with a concussion and entered concussion protocol, as he remained inactive as the Jets lost 9–30 to the New Orleans Saints. On December 21, 2021, the Jets officially placed Carter on the COVID-19/reserve list and he remained inactive as the Jets defeated the Jacksonville Jaguars 26–21 in Week 16. On January 2, 2022, he collected a season-high eight combined tackles (six solo) and had his first career sack on Tom Brady for a five-yard loss during a 28–24 loss against the Tampa Bay Buccaneers. He finished his rookie season with a total of 72 combined tackles (45 solo), five pass deflections, two fumble recoveries, and one sack in 15 games and seven starts. He earned an overall grade of 53.7 from Pro Football Focus as a rookie, ranked 98th among 116 qualifying cornerbacks in 2021.

==== 2022 ====
During training camp, Carter competed to be a starting cornerback against Bryce Hall and D. J. Reed under defensive coordinator Jeff Ulbrich. For the second straight year, Carter started at nickelback, this time with Reed and rookie Sauce Gardner playing on the outside.

On October 2, 2022, Carter made five solo tackles, a pass deflection, and had his first career interception off a pass thrown by Kenny Pickett to tight end Pat Freiermuth to help secure a 24–20 victory at the end of the fourth quarter at the Pittsburgh Steelers. The following week, he recorded three combined tackles (two solo) and had a season-high two pass deflections as the Jets defeated the Miami Dolphins 40–17 in Week 5. In Week 8, he collected a season-high seven solo tackles, broke up a pass, and intercepted a pass thrown by Mac Jones to wide receiver Kendrick Bourne during a 22–17 loss to the New England Patriots. He finished the 2022 NFL season with a total of 63 combined tackles (50 solo), nine pass deflections, and two interceptions in 17 games and six starts. He earned an overall grade of 73.5 from Pro Football Focus, which ranked 19th among 118 qualifying cornerbacks in 2022.

==== 2023 ====
Head coach Robert Saleh retained Sauce Gardner and D. J. Reed as the starting cornerback tandem and listed Carter as the third cornerback and first-team nickelback. He was inactive for two games (Weeks 11–12) after injuring his hamstring. In Week 15, he tied his season-high of five solo tackles as the Jets lost 0–30 at the Miami Dolphins. The following week, Carter made two solo tackles and set a season-high with three pass deflections during a 30–28 victory against the Washington Commanders in Week 16. He finished the 2023 NFL season with 50 combined tackles (37 solo) and nine pass deflections in 15 games and seven starts. He received an overall grade of 80. 4 from Pro Football Focus, which ranked 12th among qualifying cornerbacks.

==== 2024 ====
On September 3, 2024, the New York Jets signed Carter to a three–year, $30.75 million contract extension that includes $13.61 million guaranteed upon signing and an initial signing bonus of $6.00 million. This made him the highest-paid slot corner in the NFL. Head coach Robert Saleh named Carter as the Jets' starting nickelback.

On October 8, 2024, the Jets announced their decision to fire head coach Robert Saleh after the team began the season with a 2–3 record and subsequently appointed defensive coordinator Jeff Ulbrich to interim head coach. He was inactive for two games (Weeks 6–7) after suffering an injury to his back. In Week 8, Carter collected a season-high five combined tackles (three solo) as the Jets lost 22–25 at the New England Patriots. He re-aggravated his back injury and missed two more games (Weeks 16 and 18) to end the season. He ended the 2024 NFL season with 24 combined tackles (20 solo), a pass deflection, and a fumble recovery in 13 games and one start. He received an overall grade of 50.7 from Pro Football Focus, which ranked 183rd among 223 qualifying cornerbacks in 2024.

=== Philadelphia Eagles ===
On October 29, 2025, Carter and a 2027 seventh-round pick were traded to the Philadelphia Eagles in exchange for John Metchie III and a 2027 sixth-round pick.

During the 2026 offseason, following the departure of starting safety Reed Blankenship in free agency, The Athletic's Zach Berman reported that the Eagles were likely to move Carter to the safety position.
