= Michael Carter (running back) =

American football player (born 1999)

No. 35 – Tennessee Titans
- Position: Running back
- Roster status: Practice squad

Personal information
- Born: May 7, 1999 (age 27); Okinawa, Japan
- Listed height: 5 ft 8 in (1.73 m)
- Listed weight: 201 lb (91 kg)

Career information
- High school: Navarre (Navarre, Florida, U.S.)
- College: North Carolina (2017–2020)
- NFL draft: 2021: 4th round, 107th overall pick

Career history
- New York Jets (2021–2023); Arizona Cardinals (2023–2025); Tennessee Titans (2026–present)

Awards and highlights
- Third-team All-American (2020); First team All-ACC (2020); Third team All-ACC (2019)

Career NFL statistics as of 2025
- Rushing yards: 1,692
- Rushing average: 4.0
- Rushing touchdowns: 9
- Receptions: 145
- Receiving yards: 1,038
- Receiving touchdowns: 1
- Stats at Pro Football Reference

Michael Carter (born May 7, 1999) is an American professional football running back for the Tennessee Titans of the National Football League (NFL). He played college football for the North Carolina Tar Heels and was selected by the New York Jets in the fourth round of the 2021 NFL draft.

== Early life ==
Carter was born in Japan, where his father played in the X-League. He moved to Florida as a toddler, and grew up in Navarre, Florida, where he attended Navarre High School. He rushed for 526 yards and nine touchdowns before suffering a season-ending injury during the third game of his junior year. As a senior, Carter rushed for 2,536 yards and accumulated 3,345 all-purpose yards and 45 total touchdowns and was named the Florida Offensive Player of the Year by USA Today. Carter committed to play college football at North Carolina over offers from Florida, Louisville, Mississippi State and Tennessee.

== College career ==
Carter rushed for 559 yards on 97 carries and eight touchdowns in his true freshman season. As a sophomore, Carter rushed 84 times for 597 yards and two touchdowns and caught 25 passes for 135 yards and a touchdown. During his junior season, he rushed for 1,003 yards and three touchdowns and had 21 receptions for 154 yards and two touchdowns and was named third-team All-Atlantic Coast Conference (ACC).

Carter was named to the Doak Walker Award and Paul Hornung Award watchlists going into his senior season. Carter was named the ACC Running Back of the week after rushing for 214 yards and two touchdowns against Virginia Tech on October 10, 2020. Against Miami, Carter and fellow North Carolina running back Javonte Williams ran for a combined 544 rushing yards, the most by two running backs in college football history. Carter led the team in rushing in that game with 308 yards, along with two touchdowns. On December 21, 2020, Carter announced he would opt out of the Orange Bowl matchup with Texas A&M, in order to prepare for the 2021 NFL draft, finishing his 2020 season with 1,245 rushing yards and 9 rushing touchdowns to go along with 267 receiving yards and two more scores. His 1,245 rushing yards are eighth-most in a single season for a Tar Heel running back. That same day, he and teammate Javonte Williams were named Pro Football Focus first-team All-American for the running back position. Carter's 3,403 total rushing yards over his collegiate career are fourth best all-time for the school. He was also named a finalist for the 2020 Paul Hornung Award.

== Professional career ==
Pre-draft measurables
Height	Weight	Arm length	Hand span	Wingspan	40-yard dash	10-yard split	20-yard split	20-yard shuttle	Three-cone drill	Vertical jump	Broad jump	Bench press
5 ft 7 7/8 in (1.72 m)	201 lb (91 kg)	29 1/8 in (0.74 m)	8 3/4 in (0.22 m)	6 ft 1 3/8 in (1.86 m)	4.50 s	1.63 s	2.60 s	3.98 s	6.87 s	34.0 in (0.86 m)	9 ft 11 in (3.02 m)	16 reps
All values from Pro Day

=== New York Jets ===
On May 1, 2021, Carter was selected by the New York Jets with 107th overall pick in the fourth round of the 2021 NFL draft. Later that day, the Jets selected Michael Carter II with the 154th overall pick in the 5th round of the 2021 NFL draft from rival school Duke. He signed his four-year rookie contract with the Jets on June 4, 2021.

Carter made his first career start in Week 3 of his rookie season in 2021. He scored his first career touchdown in Week 4 in a 27–24 win over the Tennessee Titans. He suffered a high ankle sprain in Week 11 and was placed on injured reserve on November 27, 2021. He was activated on December 18. He finished his rookie season with 147 carries for 639 rushing yards and four rushing touchdowns to go along with 36 receptions for 325 receiving yards. He finished fourth among rookies in rushing yards in 2021.

In Week 5 of the 2022 season, Carter had two rushing touchdowns against the Miami Dolphins in the 40–17 victory. He finished the 2022 season with 114 carries for 402 rushing yards and three rushing touchdowns to go along with 41 receptions for 288 receiving yards in 16 games and ten starts.

On November 14, 2023, Carter was released by the Jets.

=== Arizona Cardinals ===
On November 15, 2023, Carter was claimed off waivers by the Arizona Cardinals.

Carter was waived by the Cardinals on August 27, 2024 and re-signed to the practice squad the following day. He was promoted to the active roster on January 1, 2025.

On August 26, 2025, Carter was waived by the Cardinals as part of final roster cuts and re-signed to the practice squad the following day. He was signed to the active roster on September 29. Carter was released on October 27 and re-signed to the practice squad the next day. He was promoted back to the active roster on November 8.

=== Tennessee Titans ===
On April 1, 2026, Carter signed with the Tennessee Titans. Carter was waived by the Titans as a part of final roster cuts on August 30, but re–signed with the team's practice squad the next day. On September 29, Carter was promoted to the active roster. He was waived on November 14 and re-signed to the practice squad on three days later.

== NFL career statistics ==
Legend
**Bold**	Career high

Year	Team	Games		Rushing					Receiving					Fumbles	
Year	Team	GP	GS	Att	Yds	Avg	Lng	TD	Rec	Yds	Avg	Lng	TD	Fum	Lost
2021	NYJ	14	**11**	**147**	**639**	4.3	**55**	**4**	36	**325**	**9.0**	23	0	1	**1**
2022	NYJ	**16**	10	114	402	3.5	25	3	**41**	288	7.0	**37**	0	**2**	**1**
2023	NYJ	9	0	8	38	4.8	9	0	15	68	4.5	10	0	0	0
2023	ARI	6	0	22	149	**6.8**	21	0	9	33	3.7	8	**1**	0	0
2024	ARI	3	1	35	131	3.7	13	1	11	57	5.2	18	0	0	0
2025	ARI	13	5	92	333	3.6	22	1	33	267	8.1	18	0	0	0
Career		61	27	418	1,692	4.0	55	9	145	1,038	7.2	37	1	3	2
