= Braxton Berrios =

American football player (born 1995)

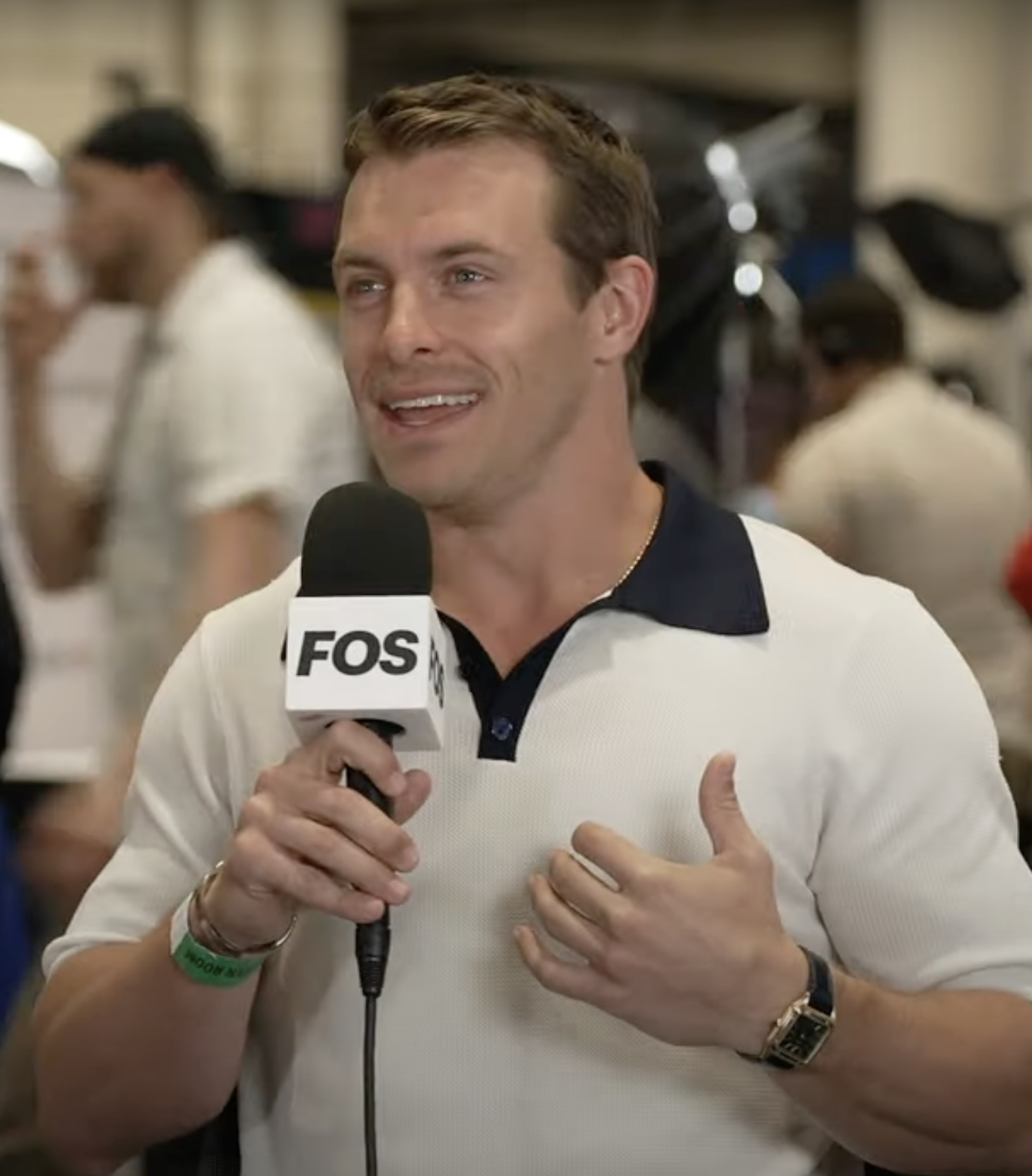
- Berrios in 2025

No. 87 – New York Giants
- Positions: Wide receiver, return specialist
- Roster status: Injured reserve

Personal information
- Born: October 6, 1995 (age 31); Raleigh, North Carolina, U.S.
- Listed height: 5 ft 9 in (1.75 m)
- Listed weight: 190 lb (86 kg)

Career information
- High school: Leesville Road (Raleigh)
- College: Miami (FL) (2014–2017)
- NFL draft: 2018: 6th round, 210th overall pick

Career history
- New England Patriots (2018); New York Jets (2019–2022); Miami Dolphins (2023–2024); Houston Texans (2025); New York Giants (2026–present)

Awards and highlights
- Super Bowl champion (LIII); First-team All-Pro (2021) (Note: Selected as a Kick Returner); Third-team All-ACC (2017)

Career NFL statistics as of 2026
- Receptions: 140
- Receiving yards: 1,360
- Receiving touchdowns: 6
- Rushing yards: 171
- Rushing touchdowns: 4
- Return yards: 3,543
- Return touchdowns: 1
- Stats at Pro Football Reference

Braxton Berrios (born October 6, 1995) is an American professional football wide receiver and return specialist for the New York Giants of the National Football League (NFL). He played college football for the Miami Hurricanes. He was a star athlete at Leesville Road High School in Raleigh, North Carolina, where he played quarterback and wide receiver. He was selected by the New England Patriots in the sixth round of the 2018 NFL draft. He previously played for the New York Jets, Miami Dolphins and Houston Texans.

== College career ==
Berrios attended Leesville Road High School in Raleigh, North Carolina. A four-star wide receiver, he committed to the Miami Hurricanes over Ohio State, Clemson, Oregon, and other Power 5 schools. Berrios played as a true freshman, finishing the season with 21 catches for 232 yards and 3 touchdowns. In 2017, Berrios caught two touchdown passes against Florida State to help beat the Seminoles for the first time since 2009.

== Professional career ==
Pre-draft measurables
Height	Weight	Arm length	Hand span	Wingspan	40-yard dash	10-yard split	20-yard split	20-yard shuttle	Three-cone drill	Vertical jump	Broad jump	Bench press
5 ft 8 5/8 in (1.74 m)	184 lb (83 kg)	28 in (0.71 m)	9 1/4 in (0.23 m)	5 ft 8 1/4 in (1.73 m)	4.44 s	1.58 s	2.59 s	4.18 s	6.72 s	36 in (0.91 m)	9 ft 2 in (2.79 m)	11 reps
All values from NFL Combine/Miami's Pro Day

=== New England Patriots ===
Berrios was selected by the New England Patriots in the sixth round with the 210th overall pick in the 2018 NFL draft. On September 1, 2018, Berrios was placed on injured reserve. Although he never played in a game, Berrios was awarded a Super Bowl ring by the team after its victory over the Los Angeles Rams in Super Bowl LIII. He was waived during final roster cuts on August 30, 2019.

=== New York Jets ===
On September 1, 2019, Berrios was claimed off waivers by the New York Jets. In limited action, he returned 21 punts, four kicks, and had six pass receptions.

In his second season with the Jets, on September 20, 2020, Berrios scored his first career touchdown off of a 30-yard pass from Sam Darnold, in a 31–13 loss to the San Francisco 49ers.

In Week 16 of the 2020 season against the Cleveland Browns, Berrios caught a 43-yard touchdown pass from fellow wide receiver Jamison Crowder on a trick play during the 23–16 win.

In Week 7 of the 2021 season, against the Cincinnati Bengals, he recorded a receiving touchdown. In Week 16 against the Jacksonville Jaguars, Berrios returned a kickoff for a touchdown in a 26–21 win, earning AFC Special Teams Player of the Week. In Week 17, he caught a touchdown and rushed for another touchdown, becoming the first Jets receiver to do so in the same game. Berrios finished second on the team with 46 catches for 431 yards and two touchdowns, plus another 40 yards and two scores rushing. He was awarded first-team All-Pro honors as a kick returner. Berrios finished the season ranked third in the NFL in kickoff return yards (852) and third in yards per punt return (13.4).

On March 14, 2022, Berrios re-signed with the Jets on a two-year, $12 million contract. In Week 4 against the Pittsburgh Steelers, Berrios was part of a trick play in which he threw a two–yard pass to Zach Wilson for a touchdown. Wilson's score made him the first Jets quarterback to record a receiving touchdown.

On March 9, 2023, Berrios was released by the Jets.

=== Miami Dolphins ===
On March 16, 2023, Berrios signed a one-year contract with the Miami Dolphins. He played in 16 games, recording 27 catches for 238 yards and one touchdown.

Berrios re-signed with the Dolphins on March 21, 2024. On October 21, Berrios was placed on injured reserve after suffering a torn ACL in Miami's Week 7 loss against the Indianapolis Colts. He appeared in six games in the 2024 season.

=== Houston Texans ===
On March 14, 2025, Berrios signed with the Houston Texans. He appeared in four games for Houston, posting six receptions for 37 scoreless yards.

=== New York Giants ===
On June 1, 2026, Berrios signed a one-year, $1.3 million contract with the New York Giants, following an impressive workout with the team. He was released by the Giants as a part of final roster cuts on August 30; he was re-signed to the team's practice squad the following day. On September 12, Berrios was elevated from the practice squad ahead of Week 1 versus the Dallas Cowboys. On September 21, Berrios was elevated from the practice squad for the second time ahead of Week 2 against the Los Angeles Rams. On September 26, Berrios was elevated his 3rd and final time ahead of Week 2 against the Tennessee Titans. On September 29, Berrios was signed to the active roster. On October 5, Berrios was placed on season-ending injured reserve with a foot injury.

== Career statistics ==
Legend
	Won the Super Bowl
	Led the league
**Bold**	Career high

=== NFL ===
Year	Team	Games		Receiving					Rushing					Kick returns					Punt returns					Fumbles	
Year	Team	GP	GS	Rec	Yds	Avg	Lng	TD	Att	Yds	Avg	Lng	TD	Ret	Yds	Avg	Lng	TD	Ret	Yds	Avg	Lng	TD	Fum	Lost
2018	NE	0	0	Did not play due to injury																					
2019	NYJ	16	0	6	115	**19.2**	**69**	0	0	—	—	—	—	4	48	12.0	25	0	21	**240**	11.4	26	0	**1**	**1**
2020	NYJ	16	2	37	394	10.6	43	**3**	3	29	9.7	15	0	9	167	18.6	28	0	10	86	8.6	18	0	0	0
2021	NYJ	16	1	**46**	**431**	9.4	46	2	7	40	5.7	11	**2**	**28**	**852**	**30.4**	**103**	**1**	15	201	13.4	28	0	**1**	**1**
2022	NYJ	17	2	18	145	8.1	25	0	**9**	**91**	10.1	**25**	**2**	26	600	23.1	42	0	21	**240**	11.4	22	0	**1**	0
2023	MIA	16	1	27	238	8.8	22	1	1	11	**11.0**	11	0	18	441	24.5	33	0	**23**	235	10.2	19	0	**1**	0
2024	MIA	6	0	0	—	—	—	—	0	—	—	—	—	3	76	25.3	31	0	7	103	**14.7**	**44**	0	0	0
2025	HOU	4	0	6	37	6.2	19	0	0	—	—	—	—	3	81	27.0	32	0	3	25	8.3	10	0	0	0
2026	NYG	4	0	0	—	—	—	—	0	—	—	—	—	5	138	27.6	30	0	4	10	2.5	7	0	0	0
Career		95	6	140	1,360	9.7	69	6	20	171	8.6	25	4	96	2,403	25.0	103	1	104	1,140	11.0	44	0	4	2

=== College ===
Season	Team	Games		Receiving				Rushing				Punt return				Kick return			
Season	Team	GP	GS	Rec	Yds	Avg	TD	Att	Yds	Avg	TD	Ret	Yds	Avg	TD	Ret	Yds	Avg	TD
2014	Miami (FL)	13	4	21	232	11.0	3	0	—	—	—	4	20	5.0	0	0	—	—	—
2015	Miami (FL)	11	0	12	86	7.2	0	**4**	**72**	**18.0**	0	11	46	4.2	0	1	20	**20.0**	0
2016	Miami (FL)	13	3	12	178	**14.8**	2	0	—	—	—	**19**	**215**	11.3	**1**	**2**	**40**	**20.0**	0
2017	Miami (FL)	13	13	**55**	**679**	12.3	**9**	0	—	—	—	13	207	**15.9**	0	0	—	—	—
Career		50	20	100	1,175	11.8	14	4	72	18.0	0	47	488	10.4	1	3	60	20.0	0

== Personal life ==
Berrios and Sophia Culpo, the sister of Miss Universe 2012 Olivia Culpo, dated for two years, from 2021 to 2023.

Berrios dated social media personality Alix Earle from March 2023 to December 2025. Sources announced their mutual breakup on December 6, 2025.

He is of Puerto Rican descent through his paternal grandfather.
