= Tony Oden =

American football player and coach (born 1973)

Tennessee Titans
- Title: Pass game coordinator, Cornerbacks coach

Personal information
- Born: June 30, 1973 (age 53); Cleveland, Ohio, U.S.

Career information
- Position: Linebacker
- College: Baldwin–Wallace

Career history
- Millersville (1996) Assistant defensive backs coach; Boston College (1997) Graduate assistant; Army (1998–1999); Defensive backs coach (1998); Head JV coach (1999); East Carolina (2000–2002); Outside linebackers coach (2000); Secondary coach (2001); Safeties coach (2002); Eastern Michigan (2003) Defensive backs coach; Houston Texans (2004–2005) Defensive assistant; New Orleans Saints (2006–2011); Assistant secondary coach (2006–2010); Secondary coach (2011); Jacksonville Jaguars (2012) Defensive backs coach; Tampa Bay Buccaneers (2013) Defensive backs coach; Detroit Lions (2014–2017) Cornerbacks coach; Miami Dolphins (2018–2019); Defensive backs coach (2018); Safeties coach (2019); San Francisco 49ers (2020) Secondary/cornerbacks coach; New York Jets (2021–2024) Senior defensive assistant/cornerbacks coach; Tennessee Titans (2025–present) Pass game coordinator/cornerbacks coach

Awards and highlights
- As a player: 2× First-team All-OAC (1993, 1994); As a coach: Super Bowl champion (XLIV)

Anthony Earl Oden (born June 30, 1973) is an American professional football coach and former linebacker who is currently the pass game coordinator and cornerbacks coach for the Tennessee Titans of the National Football League (NFL). He previously served as an assistant coach for the New York Jets, San Francisco 49ers, Miami Dolphins, Detroit Lions, Tampa Bay Buccaneers, Jacksonville Jaguars, New Orleans Saints, and Houston Texans. Oden played college football at Baldwin–Wallace College.

== Early life ==
Oden was born in Cleveland, Ohio and is a native of Cleveland Heights, Ohio. He played as an outside linebacker at Baldwin–Wallace College in the early 1990s.

== NFL coaching career ==
=== Houston Texans ===
In 2004, Oden got his first NFL coaching job with the Houston Texans as a defensive assistant coach.

=== New Orleans Saints ===
In 2006, Oden was hired as assistant secondary coach by the New Orleans Saints, spending five seasons in that capacity. Head coach Sean Payton promoted him to the role of secondary coach following the 2010 season.

=== Jacksonville Jaguars ===
On January 19, 2012, Oden was hired by the Jacksonville Jaguars as their defensive backs coach.

=== Tampa Bay Buccaneers ===
In 2013, Oden was hired by the Tampa Bay Buccaneers as their secondary and cornerbacks coach. He was let go after the season.

=== Detroit Lions ===
In 2014, Oden was hired by the Detroit Lions as their defensive backs coach.

=== Miami Dolphins ===
In 2018, Oden was hired by the Miami Dolphins as their defensive backs coach under head coach Adam Gase. Following the firing of Gase in 2019, the Dolphins announced on February 8, 2019, that they had retained Oden as their safeties coach under new head coach Brian Flores.

=== San Francisco 49ers ===
On February 10, 2020, Oden was hired by the San Francisco 49ers as their defensive backs coach under defensive coordinator Robert Saleh, whom he had previously worked with in Houston, and head coach Kyle Shanahan. He replaced Joe Woods, who left to become the defensive coordinator for the Cleveland Browns.

=== New York Jets ===
On February 2, 2021, Oden was hired by the New York Jets as their senior defensive assistant and the team's cornerbacks coach.

=== Tennessee Titans ===
On January 27, 2025, the Tennessee Titans hired Oden to serve as their passing game coordinator and cornerbacks coach under head coach Brian Callahan. Following the firing of Callahan and the end of the 2025 season, new head coach Robert Saleh chose to keep him on the coaching staff.
