= Jamison Crowder =

American football player (born 1993)

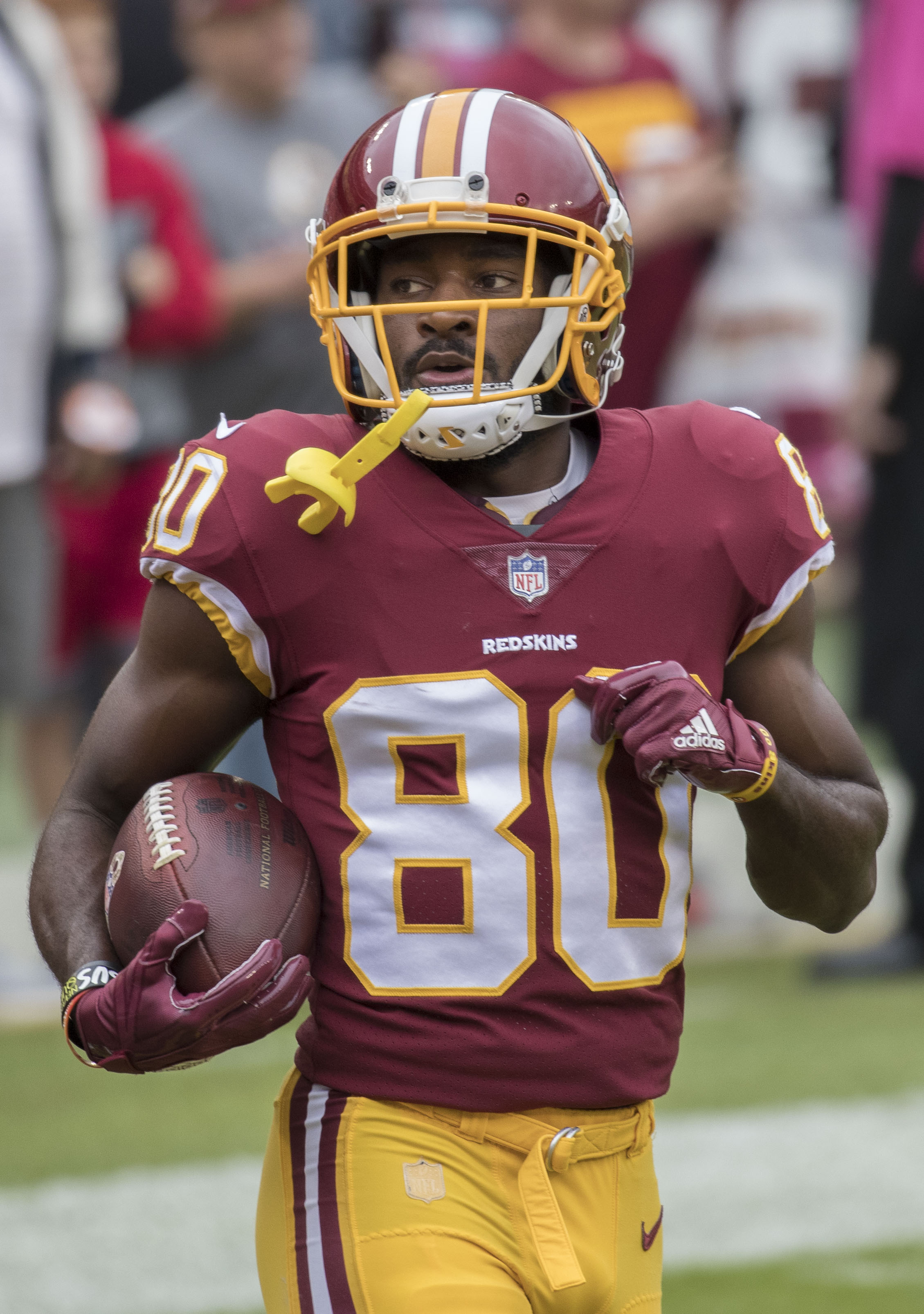
- Crowder with the Washington Redskins in 2017

No. 80, 82, 83
- Positions: Wide receiver, return specialist

Personal information
- Born: June 17, 1993 (age 33); Monroe, North Carolina, U.S.
- Listed height: 5 ft 9 in (1.75 m)
- Listed weight: 177 lb (80 kg)

Career information
- High school: Monroe
- College: Duke (2011–2014)
- NFL draft: 2015: 4th round, 105th overall pick

Career history
- Washington Redskins (2015–2018); New York Jets (2019–2021); Buffalo Bills (2022); New York Giants (2023)*; Washington Commanders (2023–2024)
- * Offseason or practice squad member only

Awards and highlights
- 2× first-team All-ACC (2013, 2014)

Career NFL statistics
- Receptions: 440
- Receiving yards: 4,898
- Receiving touchdowns: 31
- Return yards: 1,174
- Return touchdowns: 1
- Stats at Pro Football Reference

Jamison Crowder (born June 17, 1993) is an American former professional football player who was a wide receiver and return specialist in the National Football League (NFL). He played college football for the Duke Blue Devils and was selected by the Washington Redskins in the fourth round of the 2015 NFL draft. Crowder also played in the NFL for the New York Jets, Buffalo Bills, and Washington Commanders.

== Early life ==
A native of Monroe, North Carolina, Crowder was a three-year letterman at Monroe High School under coach Johnny Sowell. He helped lead Monroe High School to a three-year record of 29–10 with three state playoff berths. As a junior, he had 26 catches for 618 yards with 19 total touchdowns. He participated in the 74th annual Shrine Bowl of the Carolinas played December 18, 2010, in Spartanburg, South Carolina. Crowder also participated in basketball and track & field. He helped Monroe to a 32–1 record and the 2010 1A state basketball championship, leading him to be named Rocky River Conference Player of the Year in basketball. As a senior, he rushed for 641 yards and 11 touchdowns, caught 41 passes for 790 yards and nine touchdowns and had four returns for scores. In 2010, he was named first-team All-State and the conference's Offensive Player of the Year. Crowder was rated by Rivals.com as a three-star recruit, as well as the No. 65 athlete in the nation according to ESPN.com.

== College career ==
Crowder played college football at Duke University from 2011 to 2014 under head coach David Cutcliffe. As a true freshman, he played in all 12 games and recorded 14 receptions for 163 yards and one touchdown. Crowder became a starter his sophomore year in 2012, starting all 13 games. He finished the year with 76 receptions for 1,074 yards and eight touchdowns. As a junior in 2013, he started all 14 games. He finished with an Atlantic Coast Conference (ACC)-record 108 receptions for 1,360 yards and eight touchdowns. Crowder again started all 13 games as a senior in 2014. In his final college game, the 2014 Sun Bowl, he tied the ACC's all-time receptions record with 283. He finished the 2014 season with 85 receptions for 1,044 yards and six touchdowns.

Crowder finished his career with 283 receptions for 3,641 yards and 23 touchdowns. He also returned a school-record five punt returns for touchdowns.

== Professional career ==
Pre-draft measurables
Height	Weight	Arm length	Hand span	40-yard dash	10-yard split	20-yard split	20-yard shuttle	Three-cone drill	Vertical jump	Broad jump	Bench press
5 ft 8 3/8 in (1.74 m)	185 lb (84 kg)	30 3/8 in (0.77 m)	8 3/4 in (0.22 m)	4.46 s	1.56 s	2.58 s	4.26 s	6.99 s	37.0 in (0.94 m)	10 ft 3 in (3.12 m)	10 reps
All values from NFL Combine/Pro Day

=== Washington Redskins (first stint) ===
==== 2015 season ====
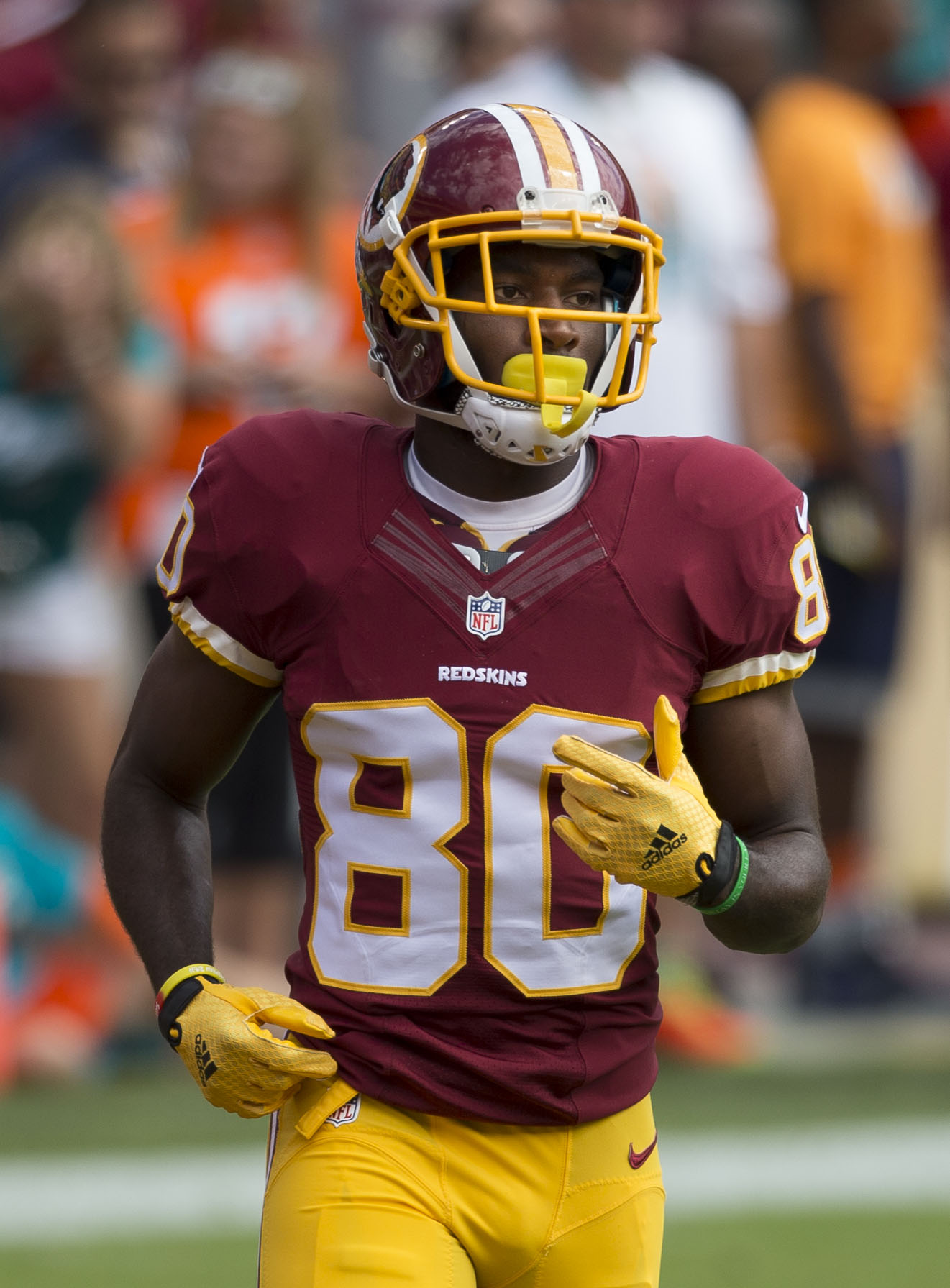
Crowder with the Washington Redskins in 2015

Crowder was selected by the Washington Redskins in the fourth round with the 105th overall pick of the 2015 NFL draft. He signed a four-year rookie contract on May 11, 2015.

On September 13, 2015, Crowder made his NFL debut against the Miami Dolphins. On October 11, 2015, Crowder caught eight passes for 87 yards against the Atlanta Falcons in his first start. On November 15, 2015, Crowder caught his first touchdown, an eleven-yard reception from quarterback Kirk Cousins, against the New Orleans Saints. On January 3, 2016, Crowder caught his second touchdown against the Dallas Cowboys, a three-yarder. Crowder also caught five passes for a career-high 109 yards, his first game with over 100 receiving yards. Crowder recorded his 59th reception of the season, breaking the team record for receptions by a rookie previously owned by Hall of Fame receiver Art Monk.

Crowder finished the season with 59 receptions for 604 yards and two touchdowns.

==== 2016 season ====
On September 18, 2016, Crowder caught his first touchdown of the season against the Cowboys, an eleven-yard reception. On September 25, 2016, Crowder caught four passes for 78 yards against the New York Giants, including a 55-yard touchdown, his second touchdown of the season. Crowder also recorded a 52-yard punt return. On October 9, 2016, against the Baltimore Ravens, Crowder returned a punt 85 yards for a touchdown, becoming the first Redskins player to do so since Santana Moss in 2008. For the play, Crowder was named NFC Special Teams Player of the Week, his first such award. On October 16, 2016, Crowder caught his fifth touchdown of his career against the Philadelphia Eagles, a sixteen-yarder. On October 23, 2016, Crowder caught seven passes for 108 yards against the Detroit Lions, his second 100+ yard game. On October 30, 2016, Crowder caught a career-high nine passes for 107 yards against the Cincinnati Bengals, his third 100+ game. On November 13, 2016, Crowder caught four passes for 37 yards and a touchdown against the Minnesota Vikings. Crowder reached the 100 career reception mark in just 25 games, the third fastest in franchise history outside of Gary Clark (22) and Charlie Brown (23). On November 20, 2016, Crowder caught three passes for 102 yards and a touchdown against the Green Bay Packers. The Redskins had two 100-yard receivers (Crowder and Pierre Garcon) and a 100-yard rusher (Robert Kelley) in a single game for the first time since Week 1 of the 1999 season (Michael Westbrook, Albert Connell, and running back Stephen Davis against the Cowboys). The Redskins featured two 100-yard receiving performances in a single game for the first time since 2014 season (Pierre Garcon and Desean Jackson at Philadelphia Eagles). It was Crowder's third straight game with a touchdown. Crowder recorded his fourth 100-yard game of his career. With Crowder's six touchdowns, he became the first Redskin to record at least six touchdowns in a season within the first two years of a career since 2009 (Fred Davis). On November 24, 2016, Crowder caught eight passes for 88 yards against the Cowboys. On December 4, 2016, Crowder caught three passes for 42 yards and a touchdown against the Arizona Cardinals. Crowder caught a 26-yard touchdown, his seventh touchdown of the season.

Crowder finished the season with 67 receptions for 847 yards and seven touchdowns.

==== 2017 season ====
During Thursday Night Football against the Giants in Week 12 on Thanksgiving Day, Crowder finished with 141 receiving yards and a touchdown as the Redskins won 20–10. Overall, he finished the 2017 season with 66 receptions for 789 receiving yards and three touchdowns.

==== 2018 season ====
In the 2018 season, Crowder recorded 29 receptions for 388 receiving yards and two receiving touchdowns in nine games.

=== New York Jets ===
On March 15, 2019, Crowder signed a three-year, $28.5 million contract with the New York Jets with $17 million guaranteed. Crowder made his debut with the Jets in Week 1 against the Buffalo Bills. In the game, Crowder caught 14 passes for 99 yards as the Jets lost 17-16. He tied Al Toon's franchise record for receptions in a game by a wide receiver. In Week 9 against the Miami Dolphins, Crowder caught eight passes for 83 yards and a touchdown in the 26–18 loss. This was Crowder's first touchdown of the season and as a member of the Jets. In the following week against the Giants, Crowder caught five passes for 81 yards and a touchdown in the 34–27 win. In Week 15 against the Ravens on Thursday Night Football, Crowder caught six passes for 90 yards and two touchdowns during the 42–21 loss. Overall, Crowder finished the 2019 season leading the team in all major receiving categories with 78 receptions for 833 receiving yards and six receiving touchdowns.

During Week 1 of the 2020 season against the Bills, Crowder finished with seven catches for 115 receiving yards, including a 69-yard touchdown as the Jets lost 17–27. In Week 4, against the Denver Broncos on Thursday Night Football, he recorded seven receptions for 104 receiving yards in the 37–28 loss. During Week 5 against the Cardinals, Crowder finished with eight receptions for 116 receiving yards and a touchdown as the Jets lost 10–30. In Week 13, against the Las Vegas Raiders, he had five receptions for 47 receiving yards and two touchdowns in the 31–28 loss. In Week 16, against the Cleveland Browns, he recorded his first career touchdown pass on a 43-yard trick play to Braxton Berrios in the 23–16 victory. In the 2020 season, Crowder finished with 59 receptions for 699 receiving yards and six receiving touchdowns.

Crowder finished the 2021 season with 51 receptions for 447 receiving yards and two receiving touchdowns in 12 games.

=== Buffalo Bills ===
On March 22, 2022, Crowder signed with the Buffalo Bills on a one-year deal. He suffered an ankle injury in Week 4 and was placed on injured reserve on October 8, 2022.

=== New York Giants ===
On March 23, 2023, Crowder signed with the Giants. He was released on by New York as a part of final roster cuts on August 29.

=== Washington Commanders (second stint) ===
On September 6, 2023, Crowder signed with the practice squad of the Washington Commanders, rejoining his former team. He was signed to the active roster five days later. In Week 6, Crowder had a 61-yard punt return, the longest in the league for the week, and was named NFC Special Teams Player of the Week for his performance. In the 2023 season, he had 16 receptions for 159 yards and a touchdown, which came in Week 8 against the Philadelphia Eagles. Crowder also contributed on punt return duties.

On March 13, 2024, Crowder re-signed with the Commanders on a one-year contract. He was placed on injured reserve due to a calf injury on October 2, and was activated on December 14. In Week 16 against the Philadelphia Eagles, he had two receiving touchdowns in the 36–33 victory.

== Post-playing career ==
On April 11, 2026, it was announced that Crowder would be returning to Duke as part of the program's "inaugural former player coaching fellowship."

== NFL career statistics ==
Legend
**Bold**	Career high

Regular season
Year	Team	Games		Receiving					Rushing					Fumbles	
Year	Team	GP	GS	Rec	Yds	Avg	Lng	TD	Att	Yds	Avg	Lng	TD	Fum	Lost
2015	WAS	**16**	6	59	604	10.2	44	2	2	2	1.0	2	0	4	1
2016	WAS	**16**	9	67	**847**	12.6	55T	**7**	2	-2	-1.0	7	0	2	1
2017	WAS	15	6	66	789	12.0	41	3	**7**	**34**	4.9	11	0	**6**	**3**
2018	WAS	9	7	29	388	**13.4**	**79T**	2	4	30	**7.5**	**25**	0	0	0
2019	NYJ	**16**	**12**	**78**	833	10.7	41	6	1	4	4.0	4	0	0	0
2020	NYJ	12	7	59	699	11.8	69	6	1	14	14.0	14	0	0	0
2021	NYJ	12	4	51	447	8.8	29	2	0	0	0.0	0	0	1	1
2022	BUF	4	0	6	60	10.0	16	0	0	0	0.0	0	0	1	1
2023	WAS	17	0	16	159	9.9	26	1	0	0	0.0	0	0	2	1
2024	WAS	5	1	9	72	8.0	12	2	0	0	0.0	0	0	1	0
Total		122	52	440	4,898	11.1	79	31	17	82	4.8	25	0	17	8

Postseason
Year	Team	Games		Receiving					Rushing					Fumbles	
Year	Team	GP	GS	Rec	Yds	Avg	Lng	TD	Att	Yds	Avg	Lng	TD	Fum	Lost
2015	WAS	1	1	3	15	5.0	6	0	0	0	0.0	0	0	0	0
2024	WAS	3	1	3	29	9.7	13	0	0	0	0.0	0	0	0	0
Total		4	2	6	44	7.3	13	0	0	0	0.0	0	0	0	0

== Personal life ==
Crowder has a younger brother named Jamaris who was born with Down syndrome. Crowder graduated from Duke in December 2014 with a degree in sociology while minoring in African and African American studies.
