= Brandin Echols =

American football player (born 1997)

No. 26 – Pittsburgh Steelers
- Position: Cornerback
- Roster status: Active

Personal information
- Born: October 16, 1997 (age 29); Memphis, Tennessee, U.S.
- Listed height: 5 ft 10 in (1.78 m)
- Listed weight: 179 lb (81 kg)

Career information
- High school: Southaven (Southaven, Mississippi)
- College: Northwest Mississippi CC (2017–2018); Kentucky (2019–2020)
- NFL draft: 2021: 6th round, 200th overall pick

Career history
- New York Jets (2021–2024); Pittsburgh Steelers (2025–present)

Career NFL statistics as of Week 10, 2026
- Total tackles: 174
- Pass deflections: 22
- Interceptions: 7
- Sacks: 1.0
- Forced fumbles: 1
- Fumble recoveries: 2
- Defensive touchdowns: 2
- Stats at Pro Football Reference

Brandin Echols (born October 16, 1997) is an American professional football cornerback for the Pittsburgh Steelers of the National Football League (NFL). He played college football at Northwest Mississippi Community College and Kentucky and was selected by the New York Jets in the sixth round of the 2021 NFL draft.

== College career ==
Echols played college football at Northwest Mississippi in 2017 and 2018. He began his college career as a wide receiver and switched to defensive back as a freshman. In 2018, he was named second-team NJCAA All-American.

Echols was ranked as a three–star recruit by 247Sports.com coming out of junior college. He committed to Kentucky on September 23, 2018, playing for Kentucky in 2019 and 2020. In the 2021 Gator Bowl, Echols recorded his first interception for Kentucky.

== Professional career ==
Pre-draft measurables
Height	Weight	Arm length	Hand span	Wingspan	40-yard dash	10-yard split	20-yard split	20-yard shuttle	Three-cone drill	Vertical jump	Broad jump	Bench press
5 ft 10 1/8 in (1.78 m)	179 lb (81 kg)	30 1/4 in (0.77 m)	9 1/8 in (0.23 m)	6 ft 1 in (1.85 m)	4.36 s	1.46 s	2.55 s	4.12 s	6.84 s	42.5 in (1.08 m)	11 ft 4 in (3.45 m)	13 reps
All values from Pro Day

=== New York Jets ===
Echols was drafted by the New York Jets with the 200th pick in the sixth round of the 2021 NFL draft. On May 7, 2021, Echols officially signed with the Jets.

Echols was named a starting cornerback to begin his rookie season in 2021. He started the first nine games before suffering a thigh injury in Week 10. On November 16, 2021, he was placed on injured reserve. He was activated on December 11.

In 2022, Echols played in 13 games for the Jets, tallying 8 total tackles. His season ended after he was placed on injured reserve on January 7, 2023.

On May 25, 2023, Echols was suspended one game by the NFL for violating the league's personal conduct policy. The suspension stemmed from a 2022 high-speed car crash Echols was involved in.

=== Pittsburgh Steelers ===
On March 13, 2025, Echols signed a two-year contract with the Pittsburgh Steelers.

== Personal life ==
On April 22, 2022, Echols was involved in a two-car crash in Florham Park, New Jersey that resulted in the partial paralyzation of the other driver. Echols had been traveling 84 mph in a 50 mph zone before making contact with the other vehicle. In January 2023, Echols was charged with fourth-degree assault by auto, and was summoned for reckless driving, speeding, failure to wear a seat belt, an unsafe lane change, and improper passing. On March 10, he was accepted into a diversionary program to avoid the charges.
