= Robert Saleh =

American football coach (born 1979)

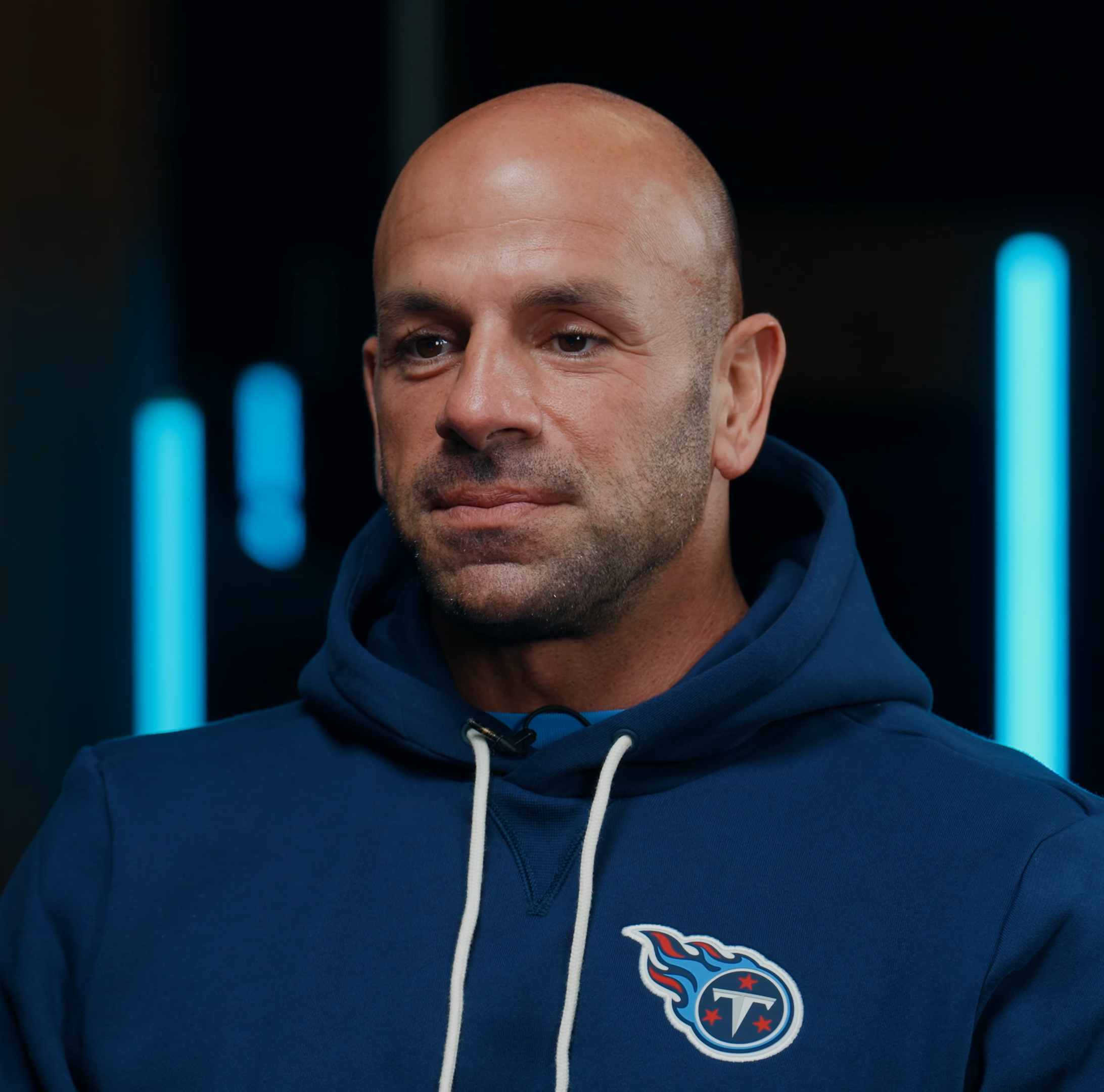
- Saleh with the Tennessee Titans in 2026

Tennessee Titans
- Title: Head coach

Personal information
- Born: January 31, 1979 (age 47); Dearborn, Michigan, U.S.

Career information
- Position: Tight end
- High school: Fordson (Dearborn)
- College: Northern Michigan (1997–2000)

Career history
- Michigan State (2002–2003); Offensive assistant (2002); Defensive assistant (2003); Central Michigan (2004) Defensive assistant; Georgia (2005) Defensive assistant; Houston Texans (2005–2010); Defensive intern (2005); Defensive quality control coach (2006–2008); Assistant linebackers coach (2009–2010); Seattle Seahawks (2011–2013) Defensive quality control coach; Jacksonville Jaguars (2014–2016) Linebackers coach; San Francisco 49ers (2017–2020) Defensive coordinator; New York Jets (2021–2024) Head coach; Green Bay Packers (2024) Offensive consultant; San Francisco 49ers (2025) Defensive coordinator; Tennessee Titans (2026–present) Head coach

Awards and highlights
- Super Bowl champion (XLVIII)

Head coaching record
- Regular season: 21–44 (.323)
- Coaching profile at Pro Football Reference

Robert Jalal Saleh (born January 31, 1979) is an American professional football coach who is the head coach for the Tennessee Titans of the National Football League (NFL). He previously served as the defensive coordinator for the San Francisco 49ers from 2017 to 2020 and in 2025, and the head coach of the New York Jets from 2021 to 2024. Saleh has also been a defensive assistant for the Houston Texans, Seattle Seahawks, and Jacksonville Jaguars. He has appeared in two Super Bowls, one each with the Seahawks and 49ers, winning Super Bowl XLVIII with the former.

== Early life ==
Robert Jalal Saleh was born on January 31, 1979, to Lebanese immigrant parents in Dearborn, Michigan. He is a 1997 graduate of Fordson High School He attended Northern Michigan University in Marquette from 1997 to 2001, earning a degree in finance. Saleh was a four-year starter for the Wildcats, earning all-conference honors as a tight end.

Saleh's brother, David, was in the South Tower during the September 11 attacks in New York City in 2001 and saw the fireball from the initial plane's impact on the North Tower from the building's 61st floor. After ignoring calls by the public intercom within the South Tower to return to their offices, he made it down to the 24th floor before the second plane hit, this time around 50 floors above in his tower. David safely made it to the lobby and was able to escape to safety. Saleh credits this event in providing the spark for him to pursue his dreams of coaching football.

== Coaching career ==
=== College ===
Saleh began his coaching career at the collegiate level in 2002. He spent four years working as a defensive assistant with Michigan State University (2002–03), Central Michigan University (2004) and the University of Georgia (2005).

=== Houston Texans ===
In 2005, Saleh was hired as an intern with the Houston Texans, working with the defensive unit.

In February 2006, Saleh was retained in Gary Kubiak's staff as a defensive quality control coach under defensive coordinator Richard Smith.

In January 2009, Saleh was promoted to assistant linebackers coach.

=== Seattle Seahawks ===
In February 2011, Saleh was hired as the defensive quality control coach for the Seattle Seahawks under Pete Carroll. He spent three seasons with the Seahawks, including their 2013 championship season when they defeated the Denver Broncos in Super Bowl XLVIII. During this span, the defense was known as the Legion of Boom.

=== Jacksonville Jaguars ===
On February 10, 2014, Saleh was named linebackers coach for the Jacksonville Jaguars under head coach Gus Bradley. Following Bradley's dismissal in December 2016, Saleh was not retained under new head coach Doug Marrone.

=== San Francisco 49ers ===
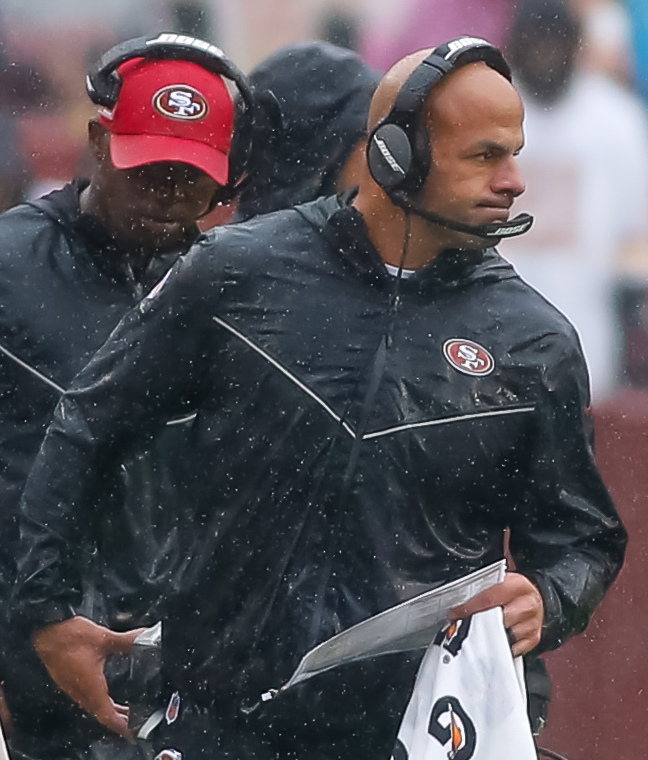
Saleh in 2019

On February 13, 2017, Saleh was named defensive coordinator for the San Francisco 49ers under new head coach Kyle Shanahan. Shanahan and Saleh previously were assistant coaches for the Texans from 2006 to 2009.

During the 2019 season, the 49ers defense was sixth in the league in forced turnovers (27), second in total defense (281.8 yards per game), first in passing defense (169.2 yards per game), and fourth in sacks (48). This was the first time since 2003 that the team finished in the top 10 in both scoring and yards per game. Saleh helped lead the 49ers to a 13–3 record and a Super Bowl LIV berth, where they lost to the Kansas City Chiefs by a score of 31–20.

=== New York Jets ===
On January 14, 2021, Saleh signed a five-year contract to become the head coach of the New York Jets.

On September 12, 2021, Saleh lost his head coaching debut against the Carolina Panthers by a score of 19–14. He won his first game as a head coach three weeks later in a 27–24 overtime victory over the Tennessee Titans. In his first season as head coach, the Jets finished with a 4–13 record and missed the playoffs for the eleventh consecutive year.

In the 2022 season, Saleh led the Jets to a 7–10 record and the team missed the playoffs.

On April 26, 2023, the Jets acquired four-time MVP quarterback Aaron Rodgers from the Green Bay Packers in exchange for their first, second (via Cleveland) and sixth-round selections in the 2023 NFL draft and a conditional second-round selection in the 2024 NFL draft.

With the arrival of the superstar gunslinger, the Jets went into the 2023 season with high projections and were widely expected to make the postseason for the first time since 2010. However, just four offensive snaps into New York's Week 1 opener on Monday Night Football against the Buffalo Bills, Rodgers injured his Achilles after being sacked by Bills' defensive end Leonard Floyd, and backup Zach Wilson went on to lead the Jets to a 22–16 overtime victory. The next day, Rodgers was diagnosed with an Achilles tendon rupture and was placed on injured reserve, ending his season after just one pass attempt, an incompletion, and forcing the Jets to turn to Wilson for the rest of the year. With Zach Wilson starting in 11 games, while juggling between Trevor Siemian and Tim Boyle in the aftermath of Wilson's ultimate benching, the Jets finished the season with a 7–10 record for the second consecutive year and missing the playoffs once more.

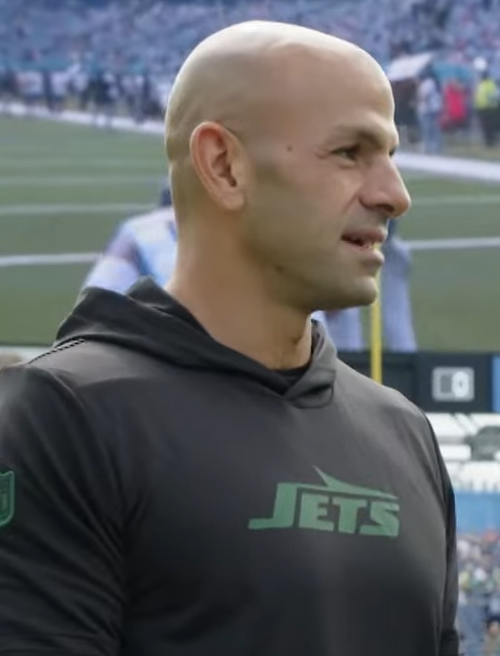
Saleh in 2024

The Jets began the 2024 season with a 2–3 record under Aaron Rodgers, with the two victories being over the Titans and Patriots, who ultimately finished the season 3–14 and 4–13, respectively. On October 8, 2024, two days after a 23–17 loss in London to the Minnesota Vikings, Saleh was fired by the Jets. He finished his Jets tenure with a 20–36 (.357) record in just over three seasons.

=== Green Bay Packers ===
On October 23, 2024, Green Bay Packers head coach Matt LaFleur confirmed to reporters that he had enlisted Saleh in a consultant role to help with the offensive game plan, but that his role would be "fluid."

=== San Francisco 49ers (second stint) ===
On January 24, 2025, Saleh was re-hired by the 49ers to be their defensive coordinator.

Despite facing multiple serious player injuries, the defense finished 11th in the NFL for points allowed and the team finished with a 12–5 record. Saleh became a highly desired head coaching candidate in the 2026 NFL offseason, with the Ringer ranking him as the fifth-best head coaching candidate.

=== Tennessee Titans ===
On January 22, 2026, Saleh was hired by the Tennessee Titans to be their head coach. He later hired Brian Daboll as his offensive coordinator and Gus Bradley as his defensive coordinator.

== Head coaching record ==
| Team | Year | Regular season | | | | | Postseason | | | |
| Team | Year | Won | Lost | Ties | Win % | Finish | Won | Lost | Win % | Result |
|---|---|---|---|---|---|---|---|---|---|---|
| NYJ | 2021 | 4 | 13 | 0 | .235 | 4th in AFC East | — | — | — | — |
| NYJ | 2022 | 7 | 10 | 0 | .412 | 4th in AFC East | — | — | — | — |
| NYJ | 2023 | 7 | 10 | 0 | .412 | 3rd in AFC East | — | — | — | — |
| NYJ | 2024 | 2 | 3 | 0 | .400 | Fired | — | — | — | — |
| NYJ total | | 20 | 36 | 0 | .357 | | 0 | 0 | – | |
| TEN | 2026 | 1 | 8 | 0 | .111 | TBD in AFC South | — | — | — | |
| TEN total | | 1 | 8 | 0 | .111 | | – | – | – | |
| Total | | 21 | 44 | 0 | .328 | | 0 | 0 | .000 | |

== Personal life ==
Saleh and his wife, Sanaa, have eight children. They both speak Arabic.

Saleh is of Lebanese descent. As part of an NFL heritage program, he has occasionally worn a patch of the national flag of Lebanon sewn onto his sideline gear. Upon his hiring by the Jets, Saleh became the first Muslim head coach in NFL history. He is also the fourth Arab-American head coach of the NFL, after Ed Khayat (Philadelphia Eagles 1971–1972), Abe Gibron (Chicago Bears 1972–1974), and Rich Kotite (Philadelphia Eagles 1991–1994), who are all also of Lebanese descent.
