= Isaiah Dunn =

American football player (born 1999)

Houston Gamblers
- Position: Cornerback
- Roster status: Active

Personal information
- Born: January 31, 1999 (age 27); Oakland, California, U.S.
- Listed height: 6 ft 0 in (1.83 m)
- Listed weight: 189 lb (86 kg)

Career information
- High school: Antioch (Antioch, California)
- College: Oregon State
- NFL draft: 2021: undrafted

Career history
- New York Jets (2021); Seattle Seahawks (2022); Pittsburgh Steelers (2023)*; Green Bay Packers (2025)*; Houston Gamblers (2026–present)
- * Offseason or practice squad member only

Career NFL statistics as of 2024
- Total tackles: 10
- Pass deflections: 2
- Stats at Pro Football Reference

Isaiah Dunn (born January 31, 1999) is an American professional football cornerback for the Houston Gamblers of the United Football League (UFL). He played college football for the Oregon State Beavers.

== College career ==
Dunn played for the Oregon State Beavers for four seasons. Dunn finished his collegiate career with 115 career tackles, 16 pass deflections and a forced fumble in 33 games played.

== Professional career ==
Pre-draft measurables
Height	Weight	Arm length	Hand span	Wingspan	40-yard dash	10-yard split	20-yard split	20-yard shuttle	Three-cone drill	Vertical jump	Broad jump	Bench press
5 ft 11 1/2 in (1.82 m)	189 lb (86 kg)	32 in (0.81 m)	9 in (0.23 m)	6 ft 4 7/8 in (1.95 m)	4.38 s	1.54 s	2.53 s	4.14 s	6.91 s	35.5 in (0.90 m)	10 ft 7 in (3.23 m)	13 reps
All values from Pro Day

=== New York Jets ===
Dunn signed with the New York Jets as an undrafted free agent shortly after the conclusion of the 2021 NFL draft.

Dunn was released by the Jets on August 30, 2022.

=== Seattle Seahawks ===
On August 31, 2022, Dunn was claimed off waivers by the Seattle Seahawks. He was placed on injured reserve on October 22. Dunn was released on July 25, 2023.

=== Pittsburgh Steelers ===
On August 2, 2023, Dunn signed with the Pittsburgh Steelers. However, he was waived on August 14.

=== Green Bay Packers ===
On January 14, 2025, Dunn signed a reserve/futures contract with the Green Bay Packers. He was waived on August 12 with an injury designation and reverted to injured reserve the following day. On August 21, Dunn was released from injured reserve with a settlement.

=== Houston Gamblers ===
On January 13, 2026, Dunn was selected by the Houston Gamblers in the 2026 UFL Draft.
