= Javelin Guidry =

American football player (born 1998)

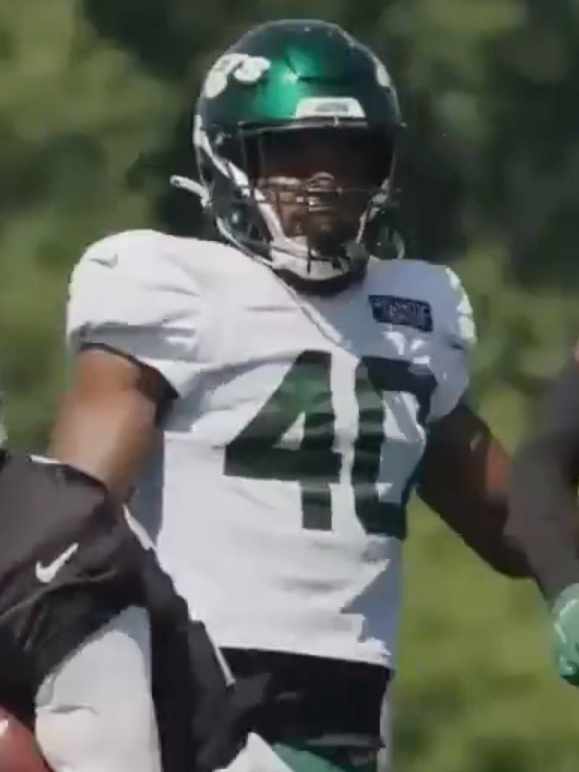
- Guidry with the New York Jets in 2022

Profile
- Position: Cornerback

Personal information
- Born: August 6, 1998 (age 28); Murrieta, California, U.S.
- Listed height: 5 ft 9 in (1.75 m)
- Listed weight: 191 lb (87 kg)

Career information
- High school: Vista Murrieta, Cedar Park (Cedar Park, Texas)
- College: Utah (2017–2019)
- NFL draft: 2020: undrafted

Career history
- New York Jets (2020–2021); Arizona Cardinals (2022)*; Las Vegas Raiders (2022); Philadelphia Eagles (2022)*; Atlanta Falcons (2022–2023)*; New York Jets (2023); Detroit Lions (2024)*
- * Offseason or practice squad member only

Career NFL statistics as of 2023
- Total tackles: 70
- Forced fumbles: 4
- Pass deflections: 3
- Stats at Pro Football Reference

Javelin Kajireh Guidry (born August 6, 1998) is an American professional football cornerback. He played college football at Utah.

== Early life ==
At Cedar Park High School in Texas, Guidry won the Texas State 100 Meter Track Championship with a time of 10.41 seconds. While at Vista Murrieta High School in California, on June 3, 2017, Guidry ran the fastest 100 meter dash in state history with a time of 10.13. In 2019, while at the University of Utah, Guidry won the 60 meter dash title at the University of Washington invitational with a time of 6.59. The mark was the seventh fastest in the world at the time that year and bested the mark of professional Kyree King.

== Professional career ==
=== Pre-draft ===
Pre-draft measurables
Height	Weight	Arm length	Hand span	40-yard dash	10-yard split	20-yard split	Bench press
5 ft 9 in (1.75 m)	191 lb (87 kg)	31 1/4 in (0.79 m)	9 in (0.23 m)	4.29 s	1.51 s	2.52 s	21 reps
All values from NFL Combine

Guidry ran a 4.29-second 40-yard dash at the 2020 NFL Scouting Combine. The mark was the second fastest time, behind only Henry Ruggs at 4.27-seconds.

=== New York Jets (first stint) ===
On May 6, 2020, Guidry was signed by the New York Jets as an undrafted free agent following the 2020 NFL draft. He was waived during final roster cuts on September 5, 2020, and signed to the team's practice squad the next day. He was promoted to the active roster on October 1, 2020, and made his NFL debut in the Jets' week 4 loss to the Denver Broncos that day.

On August 30, 2022, Guidry was waived by the Jets.

=== Arizona Cardinals ===
On August 31, 2022, Guidry was claimed off waivers by the Arizona Cardinals. He was waived on September 10, 2022.

=== Las Vegas Raiders ===
On September 12, 2022, Guidry was claimed off waivers by the Las Vegas Raiders. He was waived on September 21 and signed to the practice squad two days after. On October 25, 2022, Guidry was released from the practice squad.

=== Philadelphia Eagles ===
On October 31, 2022, the Philadelphia Eagles signed Guidry to their practice squad. Guidry was released on December 6, 2022.

=== Atlanta Falcons ===
On December 8, 2022, Guidry was signed to the Atlanta Falcons' practice squad. He signed a reserve/future contract on January 9, 2023. He was waived on May 15, 2023.

=== New York Jets (second stint) ===
Guidry returned to the Jets after he was claimed off waivers by the team on May 16, 2023. He was placed on injured reserve on August 17, 2023.

=== Detroit Lions ===
On August 14, 2024, Guidry signed with the Detroit Lions. He was released on August 27.
