= Ashtyn Davis =

American football player (born 1996)

No. 24 – San Francisco 49ers
- Position: Safety
- Roster status: Active

Personal information
- Born: October 10, 1996 (age 30); Santa Cruz, California, U.S.
- Listed height: 6 ft 1 in (1.85 m)
- Listed weight: 205 lb (93 kg)

Career information
- High school: Santa Cruz
- College: California (2015–2019)
- NFL draft: 2020: 3rd round, 68th overall pick

Career history
- New York Jets (2020–2024); Miami Dolphins (2025); San Francisco 49ers (2026–present)

Awards and highlights
- First-team All-Pac-12 (2018); Second-team All-Pac-12 (2019)

Career NFL statistics as of Week 5, 2026
- Total tackles: 246
- Sacks: 0.5
- Forced fumbles: 4
- Fumble recoveries: 4
- Pass deflections: 19
- Interceptions: 9
- Stats at Pro Football Reference

Ashtyn Davis (born October 10, 1996) is an American professional football safety for the San Francisco 49ers of the National Football League (NFL). He played college football for the California Golden Bears, where he was also a hurdler, and was selected by the New York Jets in the third round of the 2020 NFL draft.

== Early life ==
Davis grew up in Santa Cruz, California and attended Santa Cruz High School. He played wide receiver at Santa Cruz and joined the school's track team at the recommendation of his quarterback in order to become a faster football player. Although he was lightly recruited as a football player, Davis began receiving interest from college track coaches late in his senior year after he put up a strong performance 110 metres hurdles in a county track meet despite having never competed in the event before.

== College career ==
At the University of California, Berkeley, Davis originally joined their track and field team as a walk-on and only joined the Golden Bears football team after a tryout in the spring of his freshman year. In the second half of his redshirt sophomore year, Davis worked his way up the depth chart to become the starting safety alongside Jaylinn Hawkins.

As a redshirt junior, Davis made 56 tackles with five passes broken up and four interceptions while also returning 24 kicks for 629 yards and a touchdown and was named first-team All-Pac-12 Conference by the Associated Press, Athlon Sports and Pro Football Focus and honorable mention by the conference's coaches.

Davis entered his senior year on the watchlist for the Paul Hornung Award and rated the third-best safety prospect in the 2020 NFL Draft by ESPN analyst Mel Kiper. Davis was named a finalist for the Burlsworth Trophy. In the season finale against UCLA, Davis tied his single-game high in tackles with 8, including the last tackle of the game as part of a goal-line stand. Davis had 55 tackles, two interceptions, four passes defended, two forced fumbles and a fumble recovery in his senior season. He finished his collegiate career with 166 tackles, seven interceptions, 12 passes defended, two forced fumbles and three fumbles recovered on defense while returning 70 kicks for 1,604 yards and a touchdown and two punts for 33 yards.

In track and field as a senior, Davis won the Pac-12 110 meter hurdle title and was named second-team All-American. Davis was also named an NCAA Indoor All-American in the 60 meter hurdles.

== Professional career ==
=== Pre-draft ===
Davis was unable to run at the NFL Combine as he still hadn't fully recovered following surgery for a groin injury. NFL.com analyst Bucky Brooks, Pro Football Focus, and ranked Davis as the third best safety in the draft. Kevin Hansen of Sports Illustrated ranked Davis as the third best safety prospect in the draft (49th overall). He was ranked the fourth best safety by NFL draft analyst Steven Ruiz. NFL analyst Daniel Jeremiah ranked him the fifth best amongst safeties (86th overall). NFL draft analysts projected Davis to be a second or third round pick.

Pre-draft measurables
Height	Weight	Arm length	Hand span	Wingspan	Bench press	Wonderlic
6 ft 0 7/8 in (1.85 m)	202 lb (92 kg)	30 1/2 in (0.77 m)	9 3/8 in (0.24 m)	6 ft 3 1/8 in (1.91 m)	14 reps	25
All values from NFL Combine

=== New York Jets ===
==== 2020 NFL draft ====
External videos
- Jets draft Ashtyn Davis 68th overall
- Highlights: third round pick Ashtyn Davis
- Breakdown: third round pick Ashtyn Davis

The New York Jets selected Davis in the third round (68th overall) of the 2020 NFL draft. The Jets previously traded defensive lineman Leonard Williams to the New York Giants to obtain the pick. He was the sixth safety drafted in 2020. He was the first of two Cal safeties drafted in 2020, along with Jaylinn Hawkins who was selected by the Atlanta Falcons in the fourth round (132nd overall).

==== 2020 season ====
On July 24, 2020, the New York Jets signed Davis to a four–year, $4.91 million contract that included an initial signing bonus of $1.36 million.

Davis entered training camp slated to be the starting nickelback and primary backup safety. On July 25, 2020, the New York Jets traded starting strong safety Jamal Adams to the Seattle Seahawks. Following his departure, Defensive coordinator Gregg Williams held a competition between David and Bradley McDougald for the starting role. Head coach Adam Gase named Davis a backup safety, behind Marcus Maye and Bradley McDougald.

On September 13, 2020, Davis made his professional regular season debut and made one solo tackle during a 17–27 loss at the Buffalo Bills. The following week, Davis earned his first career start as the Jets lost 13–31 to the San Francisco 49ers in Week 2. He was inactive for two consecutive games (Weeks 3–4) after injuring his groin. Davis became the starting strong safety in Week 8 after Bradley McDougald underwent surgery after injuring his shoulder. On November 22, 2020, Davis had a team-leading 12 combined tackles (eight solo) and recovered a fumble on the goal line after teammate Marcus Maye caused wide receiver Keenan Allen to lose possession during a 34–28 loss at the Los Angeles Chargers. On December 6, 2020, Davis recorded six combined tackles (five solo) before exiting in the third quarter due to an injury as the Jets lost 28–31 to the Las Vegas Raiders. Om December 12, 2020, the New York Jets placed Davis on injured reserve for the remainder of the season due to a foot injury. He would remain inactive for the last four games of the regular season (Weeks 14–17). He finished his rookie season with 36 combined tackles (25 solo), one pass deflection, and a fumble recovery while appearing in ten games with five starts.

==== 2021 season ====
On January 14, 2021, the New York Jets hired San Francisco 49ers' defensive coordinator Robert Saleh, replacing Adam Gase after the Jets finished the 2020 NFL season 2-14. Davis missed the start of training camp as he was still recovering from his injury. Defensive coordinator Jeff Ulbrich named Marcus Maye and Lamarcus Joyner the starting safeties in his absence.

Davis spent the entire pre-season on the PUP list/Active as he recovered from his foot surgery. On September 1, 2021, the New York Jets placed Davis on injured reserve to begin the regular season. On October 2, 2021, the New York Jets activated Davis from injured reserve after missing the first three games (Weeks 1–3). During his absence, starting strong safety Lamarcus Joyner injured his elbow and was placed on injured reserve. In Week 5, Davis was appointed as the starting strong safety for the remainder of the season taking the starting role from Adrian Colbert. In Week 7, Davis collected a season-high 11 combined tackles (ten solo) as the Jets lost 13–54 at the New England Patriots. On December 19, 2021, Davis made eight combined tackles (three solo) and had his first career interception on a pass thrown by Tua Tagovailoa to tight end Mike Gesicki during a 24–31 loss at the Miami Dolphins. On December 24, 2021, the New York Jets placed Davis on the COVID-19/Reserve list and he was subsequently inactive for a Week 16 victory against the Jacksonville Jaguars. He finished the 2021 NFL season with 62 combined tackles (43 solo), three pass deflections, two interceptions, and was credited with half a sack while appearing in 13 games with ten starts. He received an overall grade of 60.7 by Pro Football Focus, which ranked 44th out of 64 safeties and earned a coverage grade of 66.1 which ranked 34th amongst all safeties in 2021.

==== 2022 season ====
The job as the starting strong safety was available after Marcus Maye departed during free agency. Throughout training camp, Davis competed for the role against Lamarcus Joyner, Jason Pinnock, Will Parks, and Tony Adams. Head coach Robert Saleh named Davis as a backup free safety to start the season, behind starter Jordan Whitehead and starting strong safety Lamarcus Joyner. On September 18, 2022, Davis made one solo tackle, had his only pass break up of the season, and intercepted a pass by Jacoby Brissett to wide receiver Amari Cooper in the closing seconds to seal a 31–30 victory at the Cleveland Browns. He was inactive during a Week 7 victory at the Denver Broncos after injuring his hamstring. He re-aggravated his hamstring injury and subsequently was sidelined for two more games (Weeks 13–14). He was mainly limited to appearing on special teams in 2022 and only recorded three combined tackles (one solo), one pass deflection, and one interception in 14 games with no starts.

==== 2023 season ====
Lamarcus Joyner departed in free agency and was replaced by Chuck Clark. The starting free safety role was available after Clark to his ACL and was ruled out for the entire 2023 NFL season. The New York Jets signed free agent Adrian Amos to compete for the job against Davis and Tony Adams. Defensive coordinator Jeff Ulbrich chose Tony Adams and Jordan Whitehead to begin the season as the starting safeties, which pushed Davis into a backup safety.

On November 19, 2013, Davis broke up a pass attempt and intercepted a pass by Josh Allen and returned it for a career-high 51–yards during a 6–32 loss at the Buffalo Bills. In Week 15, he collected a season-high six combined tackles (four solo) as the Jets were routed 0–30 at the Miami Dolphins. In Week 18, Davis recorded five combined tackles (three solo), a season-high three pass deflections, and intercepted a pass attempt by Bailey Zappe during a 17–3 victory at the New England Patriots. He finished with 37 combined tackles (23 solo), eight pass deflections, three interceptions, and three fumble recoveries in 17 games and five starts. Pro Football Focus gave Davis an overall grade of 74.7 in 2023.

==== 2024 season ====
On April 14, 2024, the New York Jets signed Davis to a one–year, $2.74 million contract that includes an initial signing bonus of $157,500.

External videos
- Ashtyn Davis INTs Tyler Huntley

Following the departure of Jordan Whitehead via free agency, head coach Robert Saleh stated there would be an open competition for both starting safety roles between Davis, Chuck Clark, and Tony Adams. He began the regular season as a backup safety, behind starters Chuck Clark and Tony Adams.

On October 8, 2024, the New York Jets fired head coach Robert Saleh after a 2–3 start and named defensive coordinator Jeff Ulbrich as the interim head coach. In Week 6, he racked up a season-high nine combined tackles (six solo) during a 20–23 loss at the Buffalo Bills. The following week, Davis recorded two solo tackles before suffering a head injury early in the fourth quarter and was removed from the Jets' 15–37 loss at the Pittsburgh Steelers in Week 7. He was diagnosed with a concussion and remained inactive in concussion protocol for the next two games (Weeks 8–9). On January 5, 2025, Davis earned his first and only start of the season after Chuck Clark tore his pectoral muscle and collected a season-high tying nine combined tackles (eight solo), a season-high two pass break ups, and a career-high two interceptions off passes thrown by Tyler Huntley during a 20–32 victory against the Miami Dolphins. He finished the 2024 NFL season with a total of 35 combined tackles (25 solo), two pass deflections, and two interceptions in 15 games and one start.

=== Miami Dolphins ===
==== 2025 season ====
On March 13, 2025, Davis signed with the Miami Dolphins on a one-year, $3 million contract. Davis made 15 appearances (including 12 starts) for the Dolphins during the regular season, recording one interception, four pass deflections, one forced fumble, and 65 combined tackles.

=== San Francisco 49ers ===
==== 2026 season ====
On June 2, 2026, Davis signed with the San Francisco 49ers on a one-year contract. Davis was released by the 49ers as a part of final roster cuts on August 30. The following day, he was re–signed to San Francisco's active roster.

== NFL career statistics ==
Legend
**Bold**	Career high

=== Regular season ===
Year	Team	Games		Tackles					Interceptions						Fumbles				
Year	Team	GP	GS	Cmb	Solo	Ast	Sck	TFL	Int	Yds	Avg	Lng	TD	PD	FF	Fmb	FR	Yds	TD
2020	NYJ	10	6	36	25	11	0.0	1	0	0	0.0	0	0	1	0	0	1	**0**	0
2021	NYJ	13	10	62	**43**	19	**0.5**	0	2	18	9.0	18	0	3	**3**	0	0	0	0
2022	NYJ	14	0	5	3	2	0.0	0	1	14	14.0	14	0	1	0	0	0	0	0
2023	NYJ	17	5	37	23	14	0.0	3	**3**	**66**	**22.0**	**51**	0	**8**	0	**1**	**3**	-3	0
2024	NYJ	15	1	35	25	10	0.0	**5**	2	18	9.0	18	0	2	0	0	0	0	0
2025	MIA	15	12	**65**	**43**	**22**	0.0	3	1	21	21.0	21	0	4	1	0	0	0	0
2026	SFO	5	0	6	1	5	0.0	0	0	0	0.0	0	0	0	0	0	0	0	0
Career		89	34	246	163	83	0.5	12	9	137	15.2	51	0	19	4	1	4	-3	0
