= Mike White (quarterback) =

American football player (born 1995)

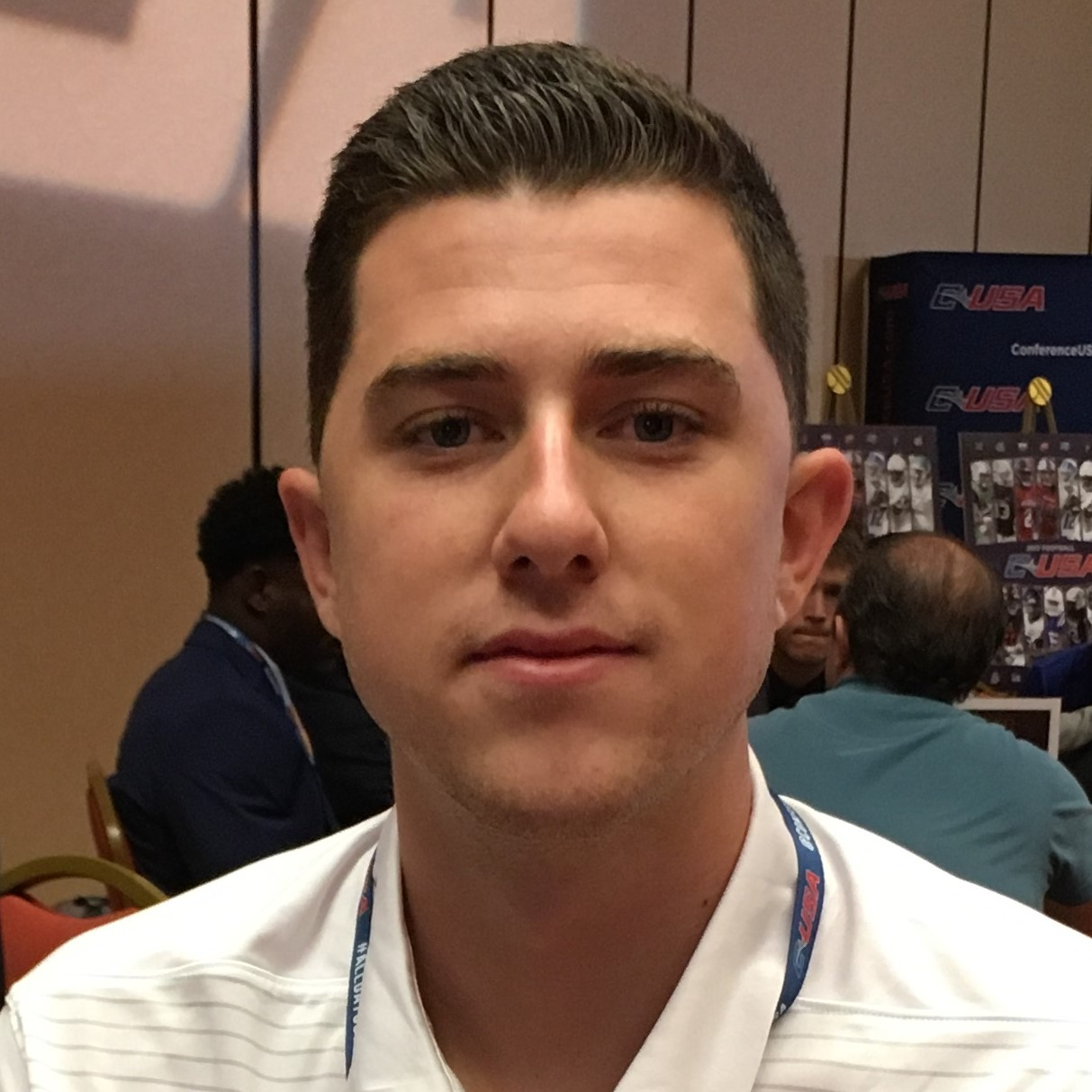
- White in 2017

Profile
- Position: Quarterback

Personal information
- Born: March 25, 1995 (age 31); Pembroke Pines, Florida, U.S.
- Listed height: 6 ft 5 in (1.96 m)
- Listed weight: 216 lb (98 kg)

Career information
- High school: NSU University School (Fort Lauderdale, Florida)
- College: South Florida (2013–2014); Western Kentucky (2015–2017)
- NFL draft: 2018: 5th round, 171st overall pick

Career history
- Dallas Cowboys (2018); New York Jets (2019–2022); Miami Dolphins (2023); Buffalo Bills (2024); Cincinnati Bengals (2025)*; Carolina Panthers (2025)
- * Offseason or practice squad member only

Awards and highlights
- C–USA Newcomer of the Year (2016); Second-team All-C–USA (2017)

Career NFL statistics as of 2025
- Passing attempts: 324
- Passing completions: 199
- Completion percentage: 61.4%
- TD–INT: 9–13
- Passing yards: 2,247
- Passer rating: 74.7
- Stats at Pro Football Reference

Michael White (born March 25, 1995) is an American professional football quarterback. He played college football for the South Florida Bulls and the Western Kentucky Hilltoppers. White was selected in the fifth round of the 2018 NFL draft by the Dallas Cowboys, where he spent one season, before joining the New York Jets the following year. A backup his first three seasons, White did not see playing time until 2021 in relief of injured starter Zach Wilson. He later replaced Wilson as the starter near the end of the 2022 season before being sidelined by injuries himself. White has also played as a backup for the Miami Dolphins, Buffalo Bills, and Carolina Panthers.

== Early life ==
White attended NSU University School in Fort Lauderdale, Florida. He did not become a starter at quarterback until his senior season, passing for 2,201 yards, 22 touchdowns and two interceptions and led his team to victory in the 3A state championship. He was named Class 3A Florida Player of the Year. He committed to the University of South Florida (USF) to play college football.

White was also a highly regarded baseball pitcher. He had a 9–2 win–loss record with a 0.43 earned run average and received All-Broward County honors as a junior.

== College career ==
=== South Florida ===
White started five games as a true freshman at South Florida in 2013, but struggled, only completing 93 of 175 passes for 1,083 yards with three touchdowns and nine interceptions.

Prior to his sophomore season in 2014, he was named the starting quarterback. In 10 starts, he completed 122 of 242 passes for 1,639 yards, eight touchdowns, and seven interceptions.

=== Western Kentucky ===
In 2015, White transferred to Western Kentucky University after South Florida head coach Willie Taggart switched from a pro-style attack to a spread offense. He missed the entire 2015 season due to NCAA transfer rules.

White was named the starting quarterback to open the 2016 season, taking over after Brandon Doughty graduated. He started all 14 games, completing 280 of 416 passes for 4,363 yards with 37 touchdowns and seven interceptions. He compiled impressive stats despite sitting out in the second halves of several games.

He returned as the starter his senior year in 2017, completing 368 of 560 passes for 4,177 yards, 26 touchdowns, and eight interceptions.

== Professional career ==
=== Pre-draft ===
White accepted his invitation to play in the 2018 Senior Bowl. On January 27, 2018, White completed 8 of 11 pass attempts for 128-yards and two touchdowns as part of Houston Texans head coach Bill O'Brien's South team that defeated the North 45–16 in the 2018 Senior Bowl. White significantly helped his draft stock with his Senior Bowl performance.

External videos
- Western Kentucky QB Mike White
- Senior Bowl: Mike White 63-yard TD Pass
- Senior Bowl: Mike White 14-yard TD Pass

He attended the NFL Scouting Combine in Indianapolis and completed all of the combine and positional drills. His draft rise was hampered by his overall performance after he put up some of the lowest marks among all quarterbacks in combine drills. On March 30, 2018, White participated at Western Kentucky's pro day, but opted to stand on his combine numbers and only performed positional and passing drills. He attended a pre-draft visits with the Indianapolis Colts, Tennessee Titans, and Miami Dolphins and also performed a private workout for the New England Patriots. At the conclusion of the pre-draft process, White was projected to be a third or fourth round pick by the majority of NFL draft experts and scouts. He was ranked the eighth best quarterback prospect in the draft by DraftScout.com and was ranked the ninth best quarterback by Scouts Inc.

External videos
- Mike White's NFL Combine Workout
- Cowboys draft Mike White 171st overall
- 2018 NFL Draft Profile: Mike White

Pre-draft measurables
Height	Weight	Arm length	Hand span	40-yard dash	10-yard split	20-yard split	20-yard shuttle	Three-cone drill	Vertical jump	Broad jump
6 ft 4 5/8 in (1.95 m)	224 lb (102 kg)	31 7/8 in (0.81 m)	9 1/2 in (0.24 m)	5.09 s	1.73 s	2.91 s	4.40 s	7.40 s	27 in (0.69 m)	8 ft 0 in (2.44 m)
All values from NFL Combine

=== Dallas Cowboys ===
The Dallas Cowboys selected White in the fifth round (171st overall) of the 2018 NFL draft. White was the eighth quarterback drafted in 2018. He became the second Western Kentucky quarterback to be drafted into the NFL and surpassed Brandon Doughty as the highest drafted quarterback from Western Kentucky.

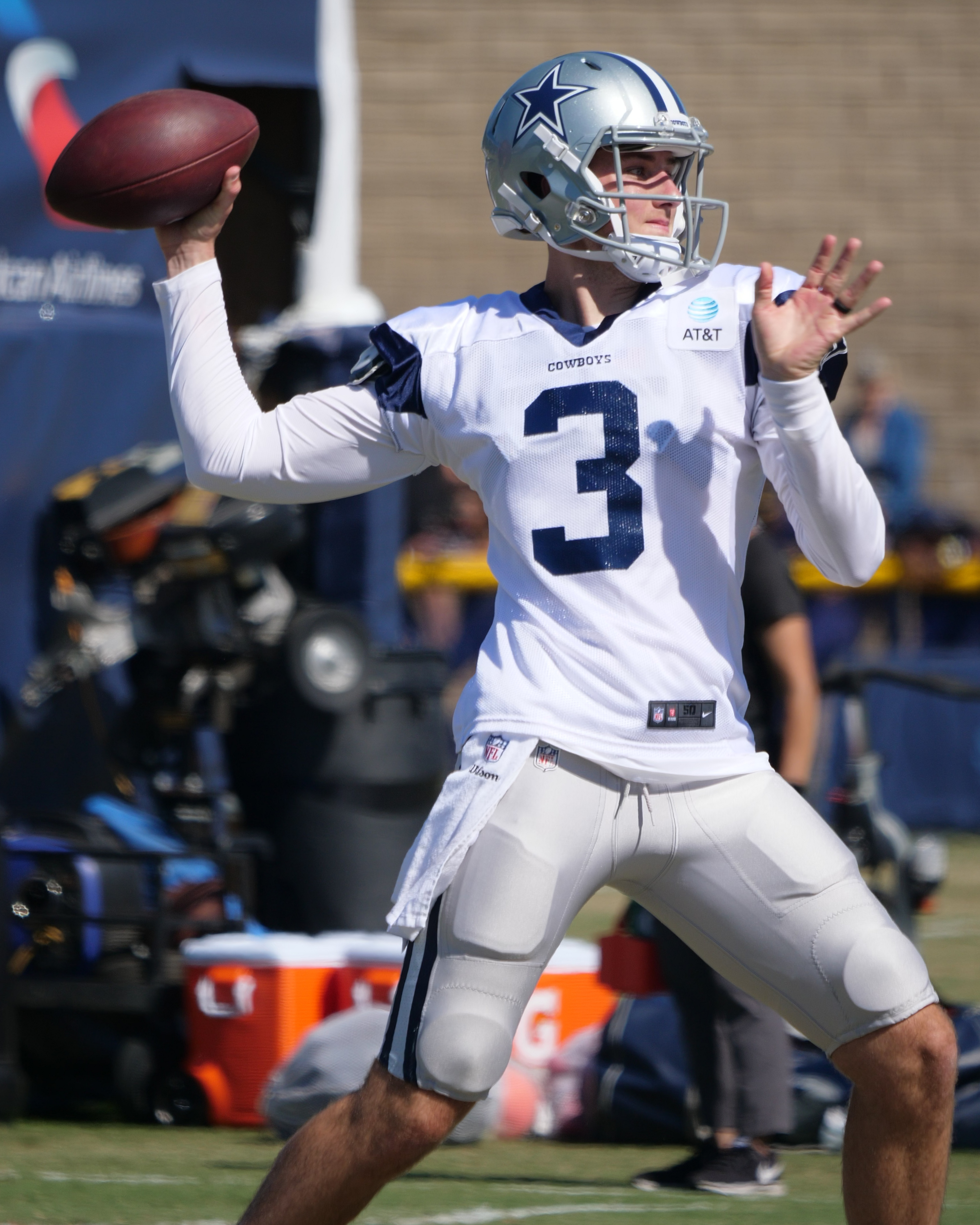
White in 2019

On May 12, 2018, the Cowboys signed White to a four-year, $2.67 million contract that included a signing bonus of $217,553. He made the team as the third-string quarterback.

In 2019, he was given the opportunity to compete during the preseason for the backup job behind Dak Prescott. On August 31, White was waived after the team decided to carry just two quarterbacks on the regular season roster. The Cowboys opted not to add him to the practice squad, choosing instead to sign rookie quarterback Clayton Thorson.

=== New York Jets ===
On September 25, 2019, White was signed to the New York Jets practice squad. He signed a reserve/future contract with the Jets on December 30.

On September 5, 2020, White was waived by the Jets and signed to the practice squad the next day. He was promoted to the active roster on September 12. White was waived on October 1, and re-signed to the practice squad four days later. He was elevated to the active roster on October 10 and 17 for the team's weeks 5 and 6 games against the Arizona Cardinals and Dolphins, and reverted to the practice squad after each game. White was promoted to the active roster on November 9. He was waived again on November 10, and re-signed to the practice squad again the next day. He was promoted to the active roster again on November 21. He was waived again on November 23, and re-signed to the practice squad again the next day. He signed a reserve/future contract with the Jets on January 4, 2021.

After an injury to starting quarterback Zach Wilson early in the 2nd quarter of a Week 7 matchup against the Patriots, White made his regular season debut. He immediately moved the Jets into the endzone with a touchdown pass to Corey Davis. Early in the 3rd quarter, he led another touchdown drive, but the Jets missed the two point conversion which would have made it a two score game. From there, the Patriots ran away with it as White finished the game with 202 passing yards, one touchdown, and 2 interceptions in the 54–13 loss. With Wilson still injured, he made his first career start against the Cincinnati Bengals in Week 8. White briefly left due to a head injury but returned, finishing the game completing 37 of 45 passes for 405 yards, 3 touchdowns, and 2 interceptions as the Jets won 34–31. He was named the AFC Offensive Player of the Week for his performance. He became the first Jets quarterback since Vinny Testaverde in 2000 to throw for 400+ yards and the first quarterback in the NFL to do so in his first career start since Cam Newton.

On March 16, 2022, White re-signed with the Jets for one year and $2.54 million.

White was announced as the Jets Week 12 starter against the Chicago Bears after Zach Wilson was benched on November 23, 2022. White completed 22 of 28 passes for 315 yards, with three touchdowns and no interceptions, in the Jets' 31–10 win. White subsequently passed for 369 yards the following week against the Minnesota Vikings, rushing for a touchdown but also tossing two interceptions and struggling in the red zone for much of the game. The following week against the Buffalo Bills, White passed for 268 yards, but suffered numerous hard hits to the chest by Buffalo's pass rush. White was forced to leave the game twice but decided to come back both times in what turned out to be a 20–12 Jets loss to the Bills. He was later revealed to have two rib injuries and was checked into a local Buffalo hospital as a precautionary measure. With White injured, Wilson was named the starter for the next two weeks.

White returned as a starter in week 17 against the Seattle Seahawks, but struggled as he passed for 240 yards with two interceptions and a fumble lost in a 6–23 defeat. On January 6, 2023, it was revealed that he had been playing through five broken ribs, and he was ruled out for the season finale against the Dolphins.

=== Miami Dolphins ===
On March 16, 2023, White signed a two-year contract with the Miami Dolphins. He was the backup quarterback behind Tua Tagovailoa. He appeared in 6 games, making 5-of-6 passes for 74 yards, including a 68-yard touchdown pass to Robbie Chosen, during garbage time in a 70–20 win against the Denver Broncos.

In 2024, he was passed on the depth chart by Skylar Thompson in the course of the preseason. On August 25, 2024, White was released after the Dolphins decided to keep only 2 quarterbacks on the roster.

=== Buffalo Bills ===
On August 28, 2024, White signed with the Buffalo Bills on their practice squad, with primary backup quarterback Mitchell Trubisky expected to miss the early part of the season due to injury. In his first interview with the press since the signing, White quipped that his "only condition" for signing with the Bills was he couldn't "be locker mates with Matt Milano", who had laid the hit that broke his ribs during the 2022 Bills–Jets game. White was elevated from the practice squad to the active roster for the team's December 1 game against the San Francisco 49ers.

On January 3, 2025, the Bills signed White to their active roster, and extended him through the 2025 season. On August 26, White was released by the Bills as part of final roster cuts.

=== Cincinnati Bengals ===
On September 16, 2025, White was signed to the Cincinnati Bengals' practice squad. He was released on October 7.

=== Carolina Panthers ===
On October 21, 2025, White was signed to the Carolina Panthers' practice squad. On October 30, White was signed to Carolina's active roster. He was released on November 8 and re-signed to the practice squad three days later.

== Career statistics ==
=== NFL ===
Year	Team	Games			Passing									Rushing					Sacks		Fumbles	
Year	Team	GP	GS	Record	Cmp	Att	Pct	Yds	Y/A	Lng	TD	Int	Rtg	Att	Yds	Avg	Lng	TD	Sck	SckY	Fum	Lost
2018	DAL	0	0	—	DNP																	
2019	NYJ	0	0	—	DNP																	
2020	NYJ	0	0	—	DNP																	
2021	NYJ	4	3	1–2	88	132	66.7	953	7.2	28	5	8	75.1	5	−1	−0.2	2	0	4	18	0	0
2022	NYJ	4	4	1–3	103	175	58.9	1,192	6.8	60	3	4	75.7	6	9	1.5	4	1	9	76	2	1
2023	MIA	6	0	—	5	6	83.3	74	12.3	68	1	1	118.1	8	−9	−1.1	0	0	0	0	1	1
2024	BUF	1	0	—	3	11	27.3	28	2.5	14	0	0	39.6	0	0	0.0	0	0	0	0	0	0
2025	CAR	0	0	—	DNP																	
Career		15	7	2–5	199	324	61.4	2,247	6.9	68	9	13	74.7	19	−1	−0.1	4	1	13	94	3	2

=== College ===
Season	Team	Games		Passing								
Season	Team	GP	GS	Cmp	Att	Pct	Yds	Avg	Lng	TD	Int	Rtg
2013	South Florida	6	5	93	175	53.1	1,083	6.2	73	3	9	100.5
2014	South Florida	11	10	122	242	50.4	1,639	6.8	85	8	7	112.4
2015	Western Kentucky	Did not play due to NCAA transfer rules										
2016	Western Kentucky	14	14	280	416	67.3	4,363	10.5	87	37	7	181.4
2017	Western Kentucky	13	13	368	560	65.7	4,177	7.5	93	26	8	140.8
Career		44	42	863	1,393	62.0	11,262	8.1	93	74	31	142.9

== Personal life ==
White is married to Mallory White. The couple have two children together: a twin son and daughter.
