= Kapono =

Kapono is a Hawaiian name. ka ("the") + pono ("good, upright")

== People ==
- Henry Kapono, American musician
- Jason Kapono (born 1981), American basketball player
- Kapono Beamer, American musician
- Zach Kapono Wilson (born 1999), American football player

== See also ==
- Kapon
- Kapone
