= Greg Zuerlein =

American football player (born 1987)

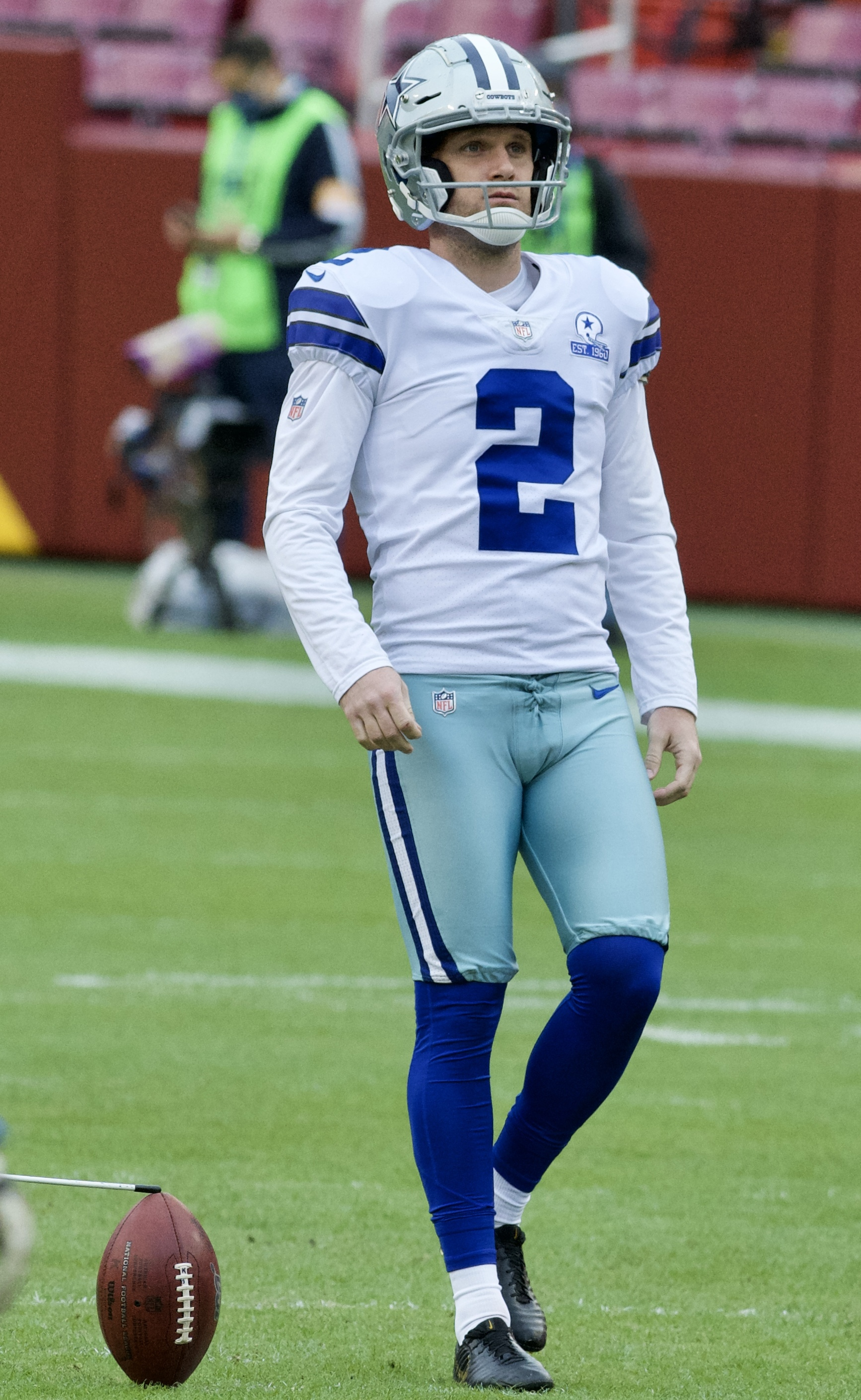
- Zuerlein with the Dallas Cowboys in 2020

Profile
- Position: Placekicker

Personal information
- Born: December 27, 1987 (age 38); Lincoln, Nebraska, U.S.
- Listed height: 6 ft 0 in (1.83 m)
- Listed weight: 195 lb (88 kg)

Career information
- High school: Pius X (Lincoln)
- College: Nebraska–Omaha (2006–2010); Missouri Western (2011)
- NFL draft: 2012: 6th round, 171st overall pick

Career history
- St. Louis / Los Angeles Rams (2012–2019); Dallas Cowboys (2020–2021); New York Jets (2022–2024)

Awards and highlights
- First-team All-Pro (2017); Pro Bowl (2017); NFL scoring leader (2017); 3× All-MIAA (2008, 2009, 2011); MIAA Special Teams Player of the Year (2011); 2× Division II Coaches All-America Team (2009, 2011); Little All-American (2011)

Career NFL statistics
- Field goals made: 338
- Field goals attempted: 411
- Field goal %: 82.2
- Longest field goal: 61
- Touchbacks: 668
- Stats at Pro Football Reference

Gregory Zuerlein (ZUR-lyne; born December 27, 1987) is an American former professional football placekicker. A native of Lincoln, Nebraska, he played college football for the Nebraska–Omaha Mavericks and Missouri Western Griffons. Zuerlein was drafted by the St. Louis Rams in the sixth round of the 2012 NFL draft. He also played for the Dallas Cowboys and New York Jets.

== Early life ==
Zuerlein was born in Lincoln, Nebraska, and graduated from Lincoln Pius X in 2006. As a junior in 2004, Zuerlein set a Nebraska state record for field goals in a season, converting 12-of-16 attempts with a long of 52 yards. His successful play earned him Nebraska All-State and All-Class honors as a junior and senior. Zuerlein also practiced soccer and was a 2005 Sports Illustrated preseason high school All-American.

== College career ==
Zuerlein accepted a football scholarship from the NCAA Division II University of Nebraska Omaha (UNO). As a sophomore in 2008, he set a school record with 61 consecutive extra points made.

As a junior in 2009, Zuerlein set school records with 17 field goals in a single-season (17-for-23) extra points in a career with 131. He made a career-long 52-yard field goal against West Texas A&M University in the Kanza Bowl. He finished the season 9 field goals shy of the school all-time career record of 45.

As a senior in 2010, Zuerlein was given a medical redshirt with a hip injury.

In 2011, UNO canceled its football program, so Zuerlein was forced to transfer to another Mid-America Intercollegiate Athletics Association school, Missouri Western State University. There, he set the NCAA Division II record of 21 consecutive field goals, nine of which were beyond 50 yards. Zuerlein set the school record with a 58-yard field goal against Northwest Missouri State University twice. He had a .952 field goal percentage by making 23 of 24 attempts, which was the highest of any NCAA player in any division with 12 or more attempts in 2011 as Zuerlein averaged 10.7 points per game.

== Professional career ==
Pre-draft measurables
Height	Weight	Arm length	Hand span	40-yard dash
6 ft 0 in (1.83 m)	187 lb (85 kg)	29 5/8 in (0.75 m)	9 in (0.23 m)	4.85 s

=== St. Louis / Los Angeles Rams ===
==== 2012 season ====
Zuerlein was selected by the St. Louis Rams in the sixth round (171st overall) of the 2012 NFL draft. He was the first non-Football Bowl Subdivision kicker to be drafted since Stephen Gostkowski in 2006, and the first below the Division I Football Bowl Subdivision since Paul Ernster in 2005. The Rams cut their primary kicker Josh Brown, who was in the final year of his $14.5 million five-year deal, the same weekend they drafted Zuerlein.

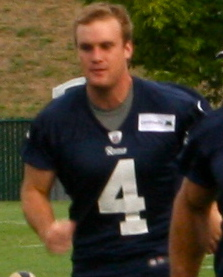
Zuerlein at training camp in 2012

Zuerlein made his NFL debut in the season opener against the Detroit Lions and converted two extra point attempts and three field goal attempts in the 27–23 loss. In Week 3, against the Chicago Bears, he made a 56-yard field goal, the longest at Soldier Field. In Week 4, he hit a 60-yard field goal against the Seattle Seahawks, which beat the franchise record of 58 yards, set by Zuerlein earlier in the same game. The kick broke Jeff Wilkins' 14-year record. He became the first player in NFL history to make a 60-yard field goal and a 50-plus yarder in the same game. He was named NFC Special Teams Player of the Week for his effort against the Seahawks. In Week 6, Zuerlein missed three field goals wide left, the first two from 37 and 52 yards, and the final one at 66 yards to tie the game against the Miami Dolphins. In Week 13, Zuerlein made a 54-yard field goal with 26 seconds remaining in overtime to give the Rams a 16–13 victory over the San Francisco 49ers at the Edward Jones Dome. It was the second longest successful field goal in NFL overtime history, three yards short of the NFL overtime record, which is held by Sebastian Janikowski. He earned another NFC Special Teams Player of the Week award for his game against the 49ers.

In 2012, Zuerlein attempted 13 field goals of 50 yards or longer, converting seven. Zuerlein converted all 26 extra point attempts and 23 of 31 field goals as a rookie.

==== 2013 season ====
Zuerlein started the 2013 season off converting all four field goal attempts and one extra point attempt in the 27–24 victory over the Arizona Cardinals. The 13 points he scored in the season opener was his highest scoring in one game on the season. Overall, Zuerlein was a reliable kicker when called upon, converting all 34 extra point attempts and 26 of 28 field goals in the 2013 season as the Rams finished with a 7–9 record.

==== 2014 season ====
In Week 2, Zuerlein converted four field goal attempts and one extra point to help provide the difference in the narrow 19–17 victory over the Tampa Bay Buccaneers. During Week 11, against the Denver Broncos, he converted all five field goal attempts and one extra point in the 22–7 victory. Zuerlein earned NFC Special Teams Player of the Week for the third time in his career.

Zuerlein finished the 2014 season converting 34 of 35 extra points and 24 of 30 field goals.

==== 2015 season ====
During the season opener against the Seahawks, Zuerlein converted all four extra point attempts and both field goal attempts in the 34–31 overtime victory. In Week 5 against the Green Bay Packers, he converted one of four field goal attempts in the 24–10 loss, the first time since his rookie year that he missed three in a single game. During Week 9 against the Minnesota Vikings, Zuerlein converted four of five field goal attempts for a season-high 12 points scored in the 21–18 loss. He missed two games due to a groin injury.

Zuerlein finished the 2015 season coverting 26 of 28 extra points and 20 of 30 field goals.

==== 2016 season ====
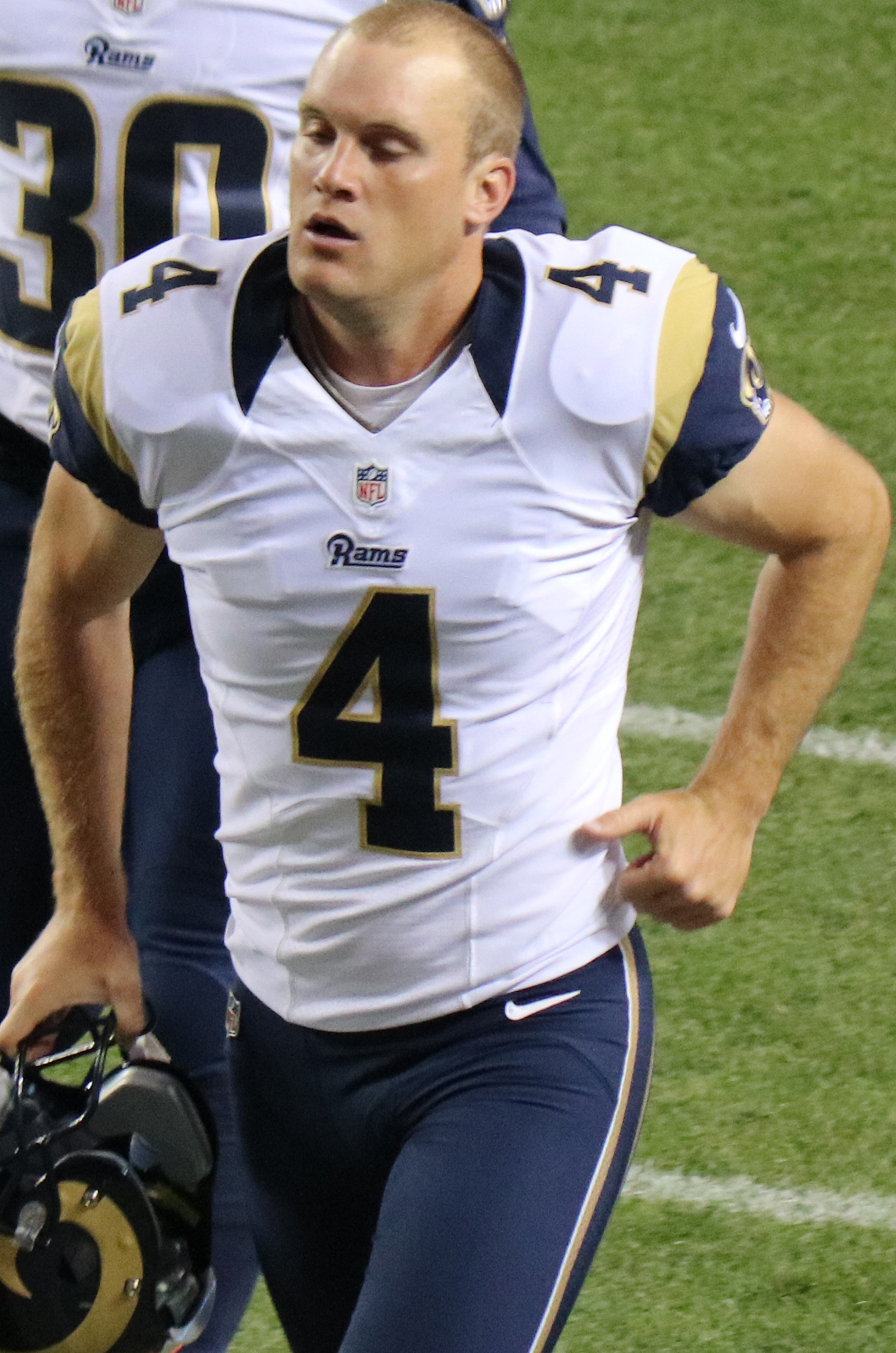
Zuerlein in 2016

The Rams made the decision to move from St. Louis to Los Angeles prior to the 2016 season. On April 15, 2016, Zuerlein signed a one-year contract to return to the Los Angeles Rams.

After the Rams were shut out on the road 28–0 against the 49ers during the season-opener, Zuerlein provided all the scoring in the 9–3 victory over the Seahawks the following week. Three weeks later against the Buffalo Bills, he converted all four field goal attempts and an extra point in the 30–19 loss.

Zuerlein finished the 2016 season converting all 23 extra point attempts and 19 of 22 field goal attempts. The Rams' offense did not provide a lot of opportunities for Zuerlein compared to the past and he scored a career-low 80 points as the Rams finished with a 4–12 record.

==== 2017 season ====
On March 14, 2017, Zuerlein signed a three-year contract extension with the Rams.

During the season opener against the Indianapolis Colts, Zuerlein converted three field goals and five extra points in the 46–9 victory. He tied with Oakland Raiders' kicker Giorgio Tavecchio for the most points scored by a kicker in Week 1 with 14. Three weeks later, Zuerlein broke the Rams record for the most field goals in a game going 7-for-7 (surpassing Jeff Wilkins in 2006) against the Dallas Cowboys in the Rams' 35–30 upset victory, earning him NFC Special Teams Player of the Week for the fourth time in his career. Zuerlein was named the NFC Special Teams Player of the Month award for his strong performances in October.

During Week 10, Zuerlein converted all four field goals, including a 50-yarder in a 33–7 win over the Houston Texans, earning him NFC Special Teams Player of the Week honors. On December 20, 2017, Zuerlein was placed on injured reserve due to a back injury. This news came a day after it was announced the Zuerlein was named to his first Pro Bowl. Zuerlein also earned NFC Special Teams Player of the Month for November. He was later named as a First-team All-Pro. Zuerlein finished the season leading the league in scoring with 158 points and 11.3 points per game.

==== 2018 season ====
During the season opener against the Raiders on Monday Night Football, Zuerlein converted all three extra point attempts as well as four of five field goal attempts, including a 55-yarder in the 33–13 road victory, earning him NFC Special Teams Player of the Week for the sixth time in his career. However, Zuerlein suffered a groin injury in pregame warmups before the next game against the Cardinals. He returned to action in Week 7 against the 49ers, converting four extra point attempts and three field goal attempts during the 39–10 victory victory.

During Week 11, against the Kansas City Chiefs on Monday Night Football, he converted six of seven extra point attempts and three field goal attempts in the historic 54–51 victory. In the regular season finale against the 49ers, he converted all six extra point attempts and both field goal attempts during the 48–32 victory.

Zuerlein finished the 2018 season converting 35 of 36 extra point attempts and 27 of 31 field goals. The Rams finished atop the NFC West with a 13–3 record and earned the #2-seed in the playoffs. In the Divisional Round against the Cowboys, he converted three extra-point attempts and three of four field-goal attempts during the 30–22 victory. During the NFC Championship Game against the New Orleans Saints, Zuerlein was instrumental in the Rams' controversial 26–23 overtime road victory, hitting all four of his field-goal attempts. This included a 48-yard field goal near the end of regulation to send the game into overtime, and then a 57-yard field goal to win the game in sudden death overtime, sending the Rams to Super Bowl LIII. The winning kick tied the record for the longest successful field goal in NFL overtime history. In the Super Bowl against the New England Patriots, Zuerlein made a 53-yard field goal late in the third quarter to score the first Rams' points and tie the game at 3–3. With eight seconds left in the game and his team down 13–3, he missed a 48-yard field goal that would have set up the Rams for a desperation attempt to tie or win the game with an ensuing onside kick recovery and a Hail Mary pass.

==== 2019 season ====
In the 2019 season, Zuerlein converted 24 of 33 field goal attempts and all 42 extra point attempts.

=== Dallas Cowboys ===
==== 2020 season ====
On March 30, 2020, the Cowboys signed Zuerlein to a three-year, $7.5 million contract. The signing reunited him with former Rams special teams coordinator John Fassel.

During the season opener against his former team, the Los Angeles Rams, Zuerlein made a 33-yard field goal, but also had a 53-yard miss in the second quarter of the 20–17 road loss. In the next game against the Atlanta Falcons, he was still struggling from a lack of consistency and missed two additional field goals, before capping off a historic 20-point comeback by kicking a 46-yard field goal to narrowly win 40–39 as time expired. With 1:49 minutes left to play and the Cowboys down 39–37, Zuerlein kicked an onside kick which the Cowboys recovered, giving them the opportunity to have the final winning drive. The style of kick he used, later came to be known as the "Watermelon Kick". During Week 13 against the Baltimore Ravens, Zuerlein connected on his first field goal attempt, but missed the next three in a 34–17 loss.

Overall, Zuerlein converted 34 of a league leading and career-high 41 field goals (82.9%) and went 33-of-36 (91.7%) on extra point attempts. Six of his seven misses were on attempts from over 50 yards, as he only made 3 of his 9 attempts beyond that mark.

==== 2021 season ====
Zuerlein had back surgery during the offseason, which forced him to rest and only kick one field goal attempt (a 56-yard miss) in the preseason, with Hunter Niswander and Lirim Hajrullahu handling the kicking and kickoff duties. On August 25, 2021, he was taken off the Active/Physically Unable to Perform list (PUP).

During the season opener against the Buccaneers, even though Zuerlein made three field goals, he also missed a field goal and an extra point, which included a 60-yard field goal near the end of the first half of the narrow 31–29 road loss. In the next game against the Los Angeles Chargers, although Zuerlein was facing scrutiny in the press for his performance, he was able to make a 56-yard field goal as time expired to close the 20–17 road victory.

During Week 6, Zuerlein made a 49-yard field goal in the rain against the Patriots to force overtime in the eventual 35–29 road victory. Two weeks later against the Vikings, he missed a 43-yard field goal early in the game against the Vikings, but also made two field goals in the 20–16 road victory. On November 9, 2021, Zuerlein was placed on the Reserve/COVID-19 list.

During Week 12 against the Las Vegas Raiders on Thanksgiving, Zuerlein missed a 59-yard field goal and an extra point attempt, forcing him to make a 45-yard field goal in the final seconds to reach overtime, but the team eventually lost on the road 36–33. In Week 16 against the Washington Football Team, Zuerlein converted a career-high eight extra point attempts. The following week against the Cardinals, he missed a 43-yard field goal in the first quarter, which ended being the difference in the 25–22 loss.

Overall, Zuerlein was 29–of–35 (82.9%) on field goals and 42–of–48 (87.5%) on extra-point attempts. He missed 6 field goals (three were over 50 yards) and 6 extra points (led the NFL). He also missed at least one field goal in three of the team's five regular-season losses.

On March 11, 2022, Zuerlein was released by the Cowboys in a salary cap move. Zuerlein played in 32 regular-season games for the Cowboys and missed either a field goal or an extra point in 15 of them (47%).

=== New York Jets ===
==== 2022 season ====
On March 26, 2022, Zuerlein signed a one-year contract with the New York Jets. He beat out Eddy Piñeiro for the placekicker job in the preseason.

In both Week 2 and Week 12, Zuerlein tied a club record by making a 57-yard field goal. During Week 13 against the Vikings, he set the franchise record for the longest field goal made (60 yards).

In his first year with the team, Zuerlein became the first Jet to make three 50+ yard field goals in two consecutive games (Week 2 against the Cleveland Browns and Week 3 against the Bengals). In Week 3 against the Cincinnati Bengals, he became the third Jet to make two 50+ yard field goals in a single game.

Zuerlein finished the 2022 season going 30-of-37 on field goals (81.1%) and 28-of-29 on extra points (96.6%).

==== 2023 season ====
On March 16, 2023, Zuerlein re-signed with the Jets on another one-year contract. During Week 5 against the Denver Broncos, he made all five of his field goal attempts and both extra points kicks for a total of 17 points (fifth-most points in a single-game by a Jets kicker), while contributing to the 31–21 road victory and receiving AFC Special Teams Player of the Week honors.

Zuerlein played in 16 games and had the best season by a kicker in franchise history by converting 92.1% of his field goal attempts (35-of-38), 15-of-16 extra point attempts, and 5-of-6 kicks from 50-plus yards. He also set a club record with 26 consecutive field goals made, tied for the lead in the NFL with four game-tying/game-winning field goals, ranked fourth in the league in touchback percentage (90.6%) and was named a Pro Bowl alternate.

==== 2024 season ====
On March 16, 2024, Zuerlein re-signed with the Jets on a two-year deal. During Week 4 against the Denver Broncos, the Jets had a chance to move to a 3–1 record but suffered a 10–9 loss, when Zuerlein's potential game-winning kick from 50 yards went wide right, after he made three previous field goal attempts (23, 35 and 40 yards) in the rain. In Week 8 against the New England Patriots, he missed a field goal and an extra point, contributing to the 25–22 loss.

Zuerlein was placed on injured reserve with a left knee injury on October 30. He was activated on December 28. During Week 17 against the Buffalo Bills, Zuerlein did not participate in the contest at all, with Thomas Morstead handling the kickoffs. Two days later, he was placed on injured reserve with a knee injury on December 31, ending his season after playing in only eight games. Zuerlein had the worst statistical season of his career, making 60% of his field-goal attempts (9-of-15) and 93% of his extra points attempts (13-of-14).

On May 16, 2025, the Jets released Zuerlein after three seasons.

== NFL career statistics ==
Legend
	Led the league
**Bold**	Career high

=== Regular season ===
Year	Team	GP	Overall FGs				PATs			Kickoffs			Points
Year	Team	GP	Lng	FGM	FGA	Pct	XPM	XPA	Pct	KO	Avg	TB	Points
2012	STL	16	60	23	31	74.2	26	26	**100.0**	67	65.5	37	95
2013	STL	16	54	26	28	92.9	34	34	**100.0**	78	65.3	52	112
2014	STL	16	56	24	30	80.0	34	35	97.1	73	**66.6**	38	106
2015	STL	14	**61**	20	30	66.7	26	28	92.9	64	65.1	38	86
2016	LAR	16	54	19	22	86.4	23	23	**100.0**	59	64.3	36	80
2017	LAR	14	56	**38**	40	**95.0**	**44**	46	95.7	95	63.9	73	**158**
2018	LAR	11	56	27	31	87.1	35	36	97.2	75	64.6	57	116
2019	LAR	16	58	24	33	72.7	42	42	**100.0**	83	63.6	64	114
2020	DAL	16	59	34	**41**	82.9	33	36	91.7	90	62.1	60	135
2021	DAL	16	56	29	35	82.9	42	**48**	87.5	**100**	64.2	**80**	129
2022	NYJ	**17**	60	30	37	81.1	28	29	96.6	56	64.1	47	118
2023	NYJ	16	55	35	38	92.1	15	16	93.8	64	64.8	58	120
2024	NYJ	8	40	9	15	60.0	13	14	92.9	33	**66.6**	28	40
Career		192	61	338	411	82.2	395	413	95.6	941	64.4	668	1,409

=== Postseason ===
Year	Team	GP	Overall FGs				PATs			Kickoffs			Points
Year	Team	GP	Lng	FGM	FGA	Pct	XPM	XPA	Pct	KO	Avg	TB	Points
2017	LAR	0	Did not play due to injury										
2018	LAR	**3**	**57**	**8**	**10**	80.0	**5**	**5**	**100.0**	**16**	**65.5**	**8**	**29**
2021	DAL	1	51	1	1	**100.0**	2	2	**100.0**	4	61.3	2	5
Career		4	57	9	11	81.8	7	7	100.0	20	64.7	10	34

== Career highlights ==
=== Awards and honors ===
NFL

- First-team All-Pro (2017)
- Pro Bowl (2017)
- NFL scoring leader (2017)
- 6x NFC Special Teams Player of the Week – (2012 – Week 4, Week 13; 2014 – Week 11; 2017 – Week 4, Week 10; 2018 – Week 1)
- AFC Special Teams Player of the Week – (2023 – Week 5)
- NFC Special Teams Player of the Month – October (2017), November (2017)

College

- 3× All-MIAA (2008, 2009, 2011)
- MIAA Special Teams Player of the Year (2011)
- 2× Division II Coaches All-America Team (2009, 2011)
- Little All-American (2011)

=== Rams franchise records ===
- Longest field goal: 61 yards
- Most field goals in a game: 7

== Personal life ==
Zuerlein and his wife Megan are devout Catholics. They have five children together.

For his kicking ability, Zuerlein has been nicknamed "The Leg" (commonly referred to as 'Greg The Leg') and "Legatron" since his rookie season.
