= Zach Wilson =

American football player (born 1999)

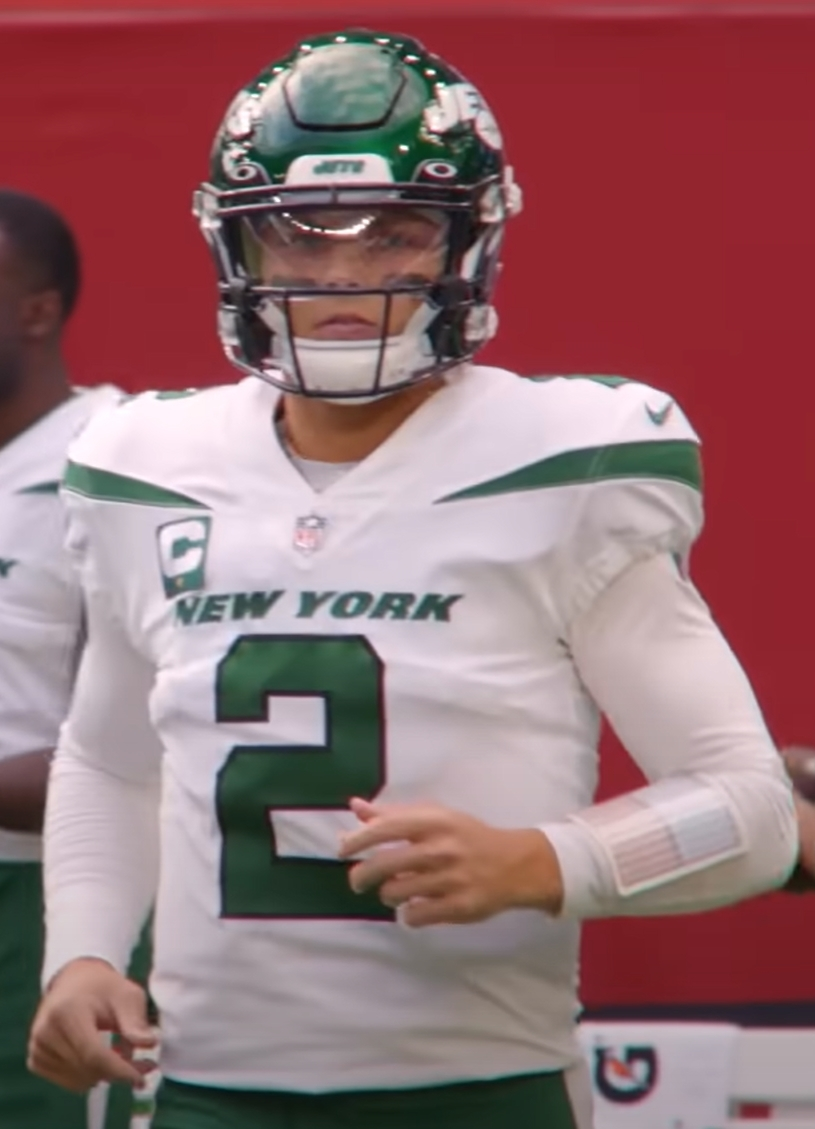
- Wilson with the New York Jets in 2021

No. 11 – New Orleans Saints
- Position: Quarterback
- Roster status: Active

Personal information
- Born: August 3, 1999 (age 27); Draper, Utah, U.S.
- Listed height: 6 ft 2 in (1.88 m)
- Listed weight: 214 lb (97 kg)

Career information
- High school: Corner Canyon (Draper)
- College: BYU (2018–2020)
- NFL draft: 2021: 1st round, 2nd overall pick

Career history
- New York Jets (2021–2023); Denver Broncos (2024); Miami Dolphins (2025); New Orleans Saints (2026–present)

Awards and highlights
- Polynesian College Football co-Player of the Year (2020) (Note: With Talanoa Hufanga)

Career NFL statistics as of 2025
- Passing attempts: 1,004
- Passing completions: 572
- Completion percentage: 57.0%
- TD–INT: 23–25
- Passing yards: 6,325
- Passer rating: 73.1
- Stats at Pro Football Reference

Zachary Kapono Wilson (born August 3, 1999) is an American professional football quarterback for the New Orleans Saints of the National Football League (NFL). He played college football for the BYU Cougars and was selected second overall by the New York Jets in the 2021 NFL draft. Wilson served as the Jets' starter during his first three seasons, but inconsistent play led to his departure from the team. He spent his next two seasons as a backup with the Denver Broncos and Miami Dolphins before joining the Saints in 2026. He is considered one of the biggest draft busts of all time.

== Early life ==
Wilson was born in Draper, Utah, on August 3, 1999. He attended Corner Canyon High School, where he played high school football. He passed for 2,986 yards and 24 touchdowns while also rushing for 752 yards and eight touchdowns as a senior. Wilson originally committed to play quarterback at Boise State University before later decommitting and choosing to attend Brigham Young University (BYU).

== College career ==
As a true freshman at BYU in 2018, Wilson played in nine games and made seven starts. He started his first career game against the Hawaii Rainbow Warriors, becoming the youngest quarterback to start a game for BYU. He finished the season having completed 120 of 182 passes for 1,578 yards with 12 touchdowns and three interceptions. He was named the MVP of the 2018 Famous Idaho Potato Bowl after completing all 18 of his passes for 317 yards and four touchdowns in the 49–18 victory over the Western Michigan Broncos.

As a sophomore in 2019, Wilson started nine games, completing 199 of 319 passes for 2,382 yards, 11 touchdowns and nine interceptions. That season, the Cougars were invited to the 2019 Hawaii Bowl, where Wilson was named BYU's MVP in the Cougars' 38–34 loss to the Hawaii Rainbow Warriors.

As a junior in 2020, Wilson started 12 games and completed 247 of 336 passes for 3,692 yards, 33 touchdowns and three interceptions while rushing for 255 yards and 10 touchdowns, breaking Steve Young's school completion percentage in a season at 73.5 percent. He helped lead BYU to a 10–1 regular season mark. He was named the offensive MVP of the 2020 Boca Raton Bowl after completing 26 of 34 passes for 425 yards and three touchdowns in the 49–23 victory over the UCF Knights. He and USC safety Talanoa Hufanga were selected as recipients of the 2020 Polynesian College Football Player of the Year Award.

== Professional career ==
Pre-draft measurables
Height	Weight	Arm length	Hand span	Wingspan
6 ft 2 1/8 in (1.88 m)	214 lb (97 kg)	30 5/8 in (0.78 m)	9 1/2 in (0.24 m)	6 ft 2 1/4 in (1.89 m)
All values from Pro Day

=== New York Jets ===
==== 2021 ====
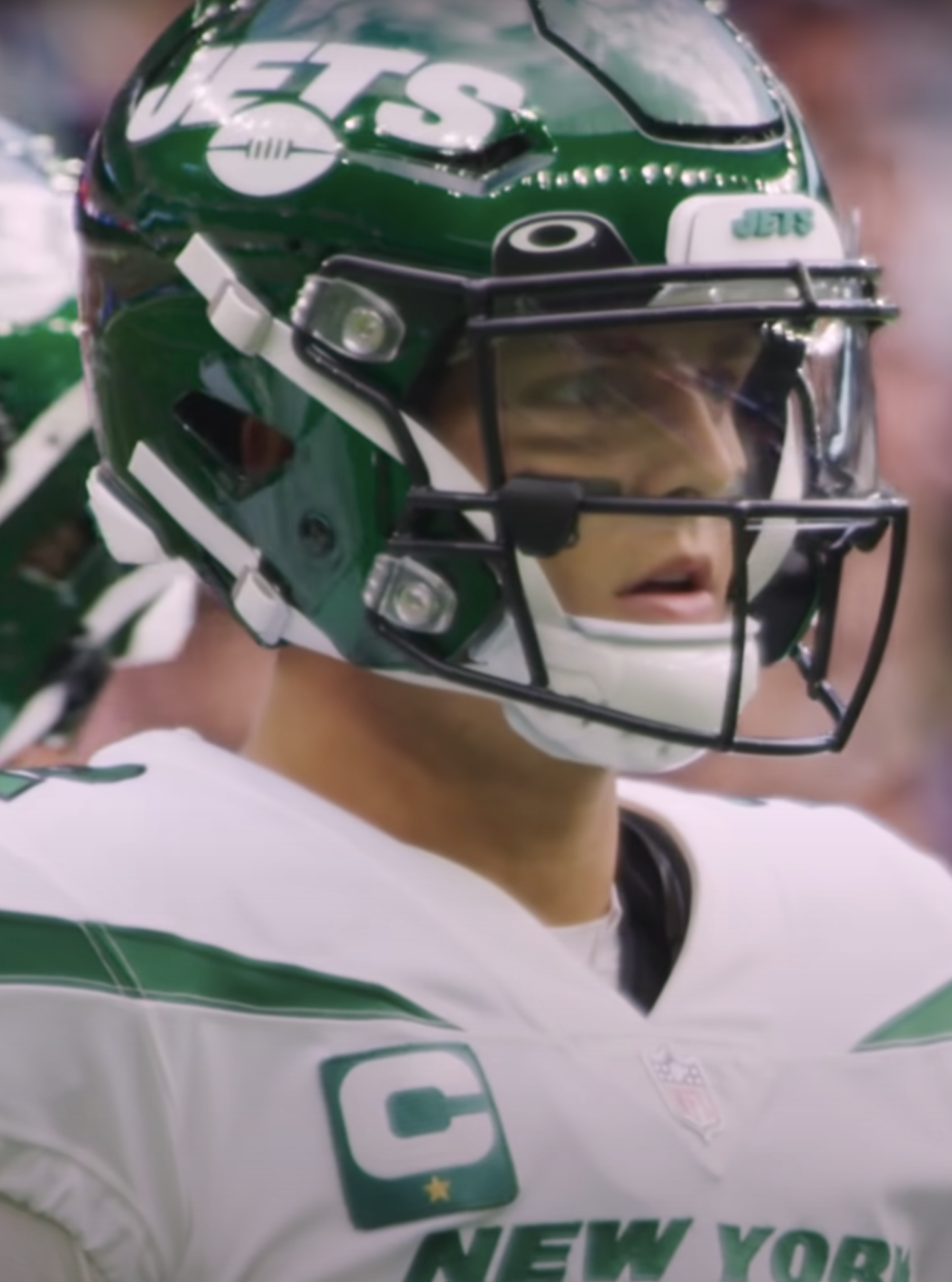
Wilson in 2021

A top quarterback prospect in the 2021 NFL draft, Wilson was selected second overall by the New York Jets. He was the second of five quarterbacks taken in the first round and the highest-ever drafted from BYU. Wilson signed a four-year deal on July 29, 2021, that was worth $35.15 million fully guaranteed, along with a $22.9 million signing bonus and a fifth year option.

In his debut against the Carolina Panthers, Wilson had an interception in the first half, but finished with 258 passing yards, two touchdowns, and a rushing 2-point conversion in the 19–14 defeat. During the Jets' home opener in Week 2, Wilson threw four interceptions against the New England Patriots, including on his first two pass attempts. The Jets subsequently lost 25–6.

Following a 26–0 shutout loss to the Denver Broncos, in which he threw for 160 yards and two interceptions, Wilson earned his first career win against the Tennessee Titans in Week 4. Wilson had one interception, but also threw two touchdowns and completed 21 of 34 passes for 297 yards. One of his touchdowns was a 53-yard pass to wide receiver Corey Davis that gave the Jets a 24–17 lead in the fourth quarter, with the team going on to win 27–24 in overtime. Wilson threw his ninth interception during a Week 5 defeat to the Atlanta Falcons, making him the fourth NFL quarterback after DeShone Kizer, Zach Mettenberger, and Blake Bortles to be intercepted in each of his first five starts.

During Week 7 against the Patriots, Wilson suffered a knee injury in the second quarter after being hit by linebacker Matthew Judon. He was ruled out for the remainder of the game, with Mike White replacing him in the 54–13 loss. Following the defeat, it was announced that Wilson had a sprained posterior cruciate ligament in his right knee, which caused him to miss four games. Wilson returned in Week 12 and won his first road game over the Houston Texans. He also scored his first rushing touchdown during the game. Wilson lost four of his last five matchups, with his final win of the season coming against the Jacksonville Jaguars in Week 16. However, he improved his turnover differential by not throwing an interception in the five games. Wilson finished his rookie season with 2,334 passing yards, nine passing touchdowns, 11 interceptions, and a 3–10 record.

==== 2022 ====
Wilson missed the first three games of 2022 season due to a non-contact bone bruise and meniscus tear he suffered in the preseason opener against the Philadelphia Eagles. He made his season debut in Week 4 against the Pittsburgh Steelers and despite throwing two interceptions, had a 2-yard receiving touchdown from wide receiver Braxton Berrios and led the Jets on a fourth quarter comeback drive to secure the 24–20 victory. The victory began a four-game winning streak for the Jets, although Wilson did not throw a touchdown pass in his next three games. New York's streak ended with a 22–17 loss to the Patriots, in which Wilson had a career-high 355 passing yards and two touchdowns, but also three interceptions. Wilson rebounded the following week when he completed 18 of 25 passes for 154 yards and a touchdown to help secure a 20–17 upset over the Buffalo Bills.

After completing only 9 of 22 passes in a 10–3 loss to the Patriots the next game, Wilson was criticized for not attributing the loss to his performance. Wilson was subsequently demoted to the third-string backup behind Mike White and second-string backup Joe Flacco. Ahead of Week 15, he was promoted to the second option and started the Jets' next two games due to an injury to White. However, after struggling against the Jacksonville Jaguars during Week 16, Wilson was benched for Chris Streveler in the Jets' eventual 19–3 defeat. Wilson was demoted back to third-string behind White and Flacco following White's return and did not take the field again for the remainder of the season.

==== 2023 ====
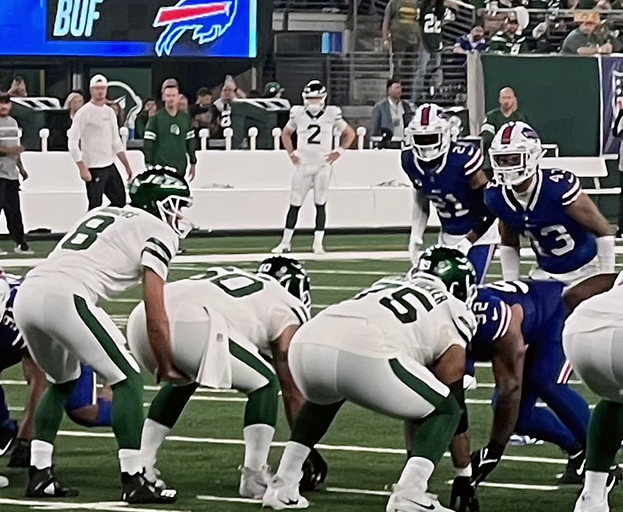
Wilson (#2) standing on the sidelines shortly before the injury of Aaron Rodgers (#8) against the Buffalo Bills in 2023

After the Jets acquired four-time MVP quarterback Aaron Rodgers, Wilson was named Rodgers' backup for the 2023 season, but took the field in the Week 1 Monday Night Football matchup against the Bills when Rodgers suffered a season-ending injury on his first drive. Wilson completed 14 of 21 passes for 140 yards, a touchdown, and an interception in the 22–16 victory. He was subsequently promoted to starting quarterback. After struggling in his first two starts of the season, Wilson had a strong performance against the Kansas City Chiefs on Sunday Night Football, throwing for 245 yards and 2 touchdowns to overcome a 17–0 deficit to tie the game at 20. However, he lost a fumble in the fourth quarter that allowed Kansas City to win 23–20.

Wilson led the Jets to three straight wins the following weeks, including an upset win over the reigning NFC champion Philadelphia Eagles, as well as driving 58 yards in 24 seconds with no timeouts on the game-tying drive against the Giants. However, following three weeks of struggles, Wilson was benched for Tim Boyle late in the third quarter of a 32–6 Week 11 loss to the Buffalo Bills. He finished the game completing 7 of 15 passes for 81 yards and an interception, although he threw the Jets' first touchdown in 13 quarters of play. Following the Bills loss, Wilson was demoted to third-string quarterback behind Boyle and Trevor Siemian.

After losing both games Boyle started in, the Jets released Boyle and renamed Wilson as their starter for Week 14 against the Texans. In his return, Wilson completed 27 of 36 passes for 301 yards, two touchdowns, and zero interceptions as the Jets won 30–6. He also finished the game with a 117.9 passer rating, the highest mark of his career. Wilson was named American Football Conference Offensive Player of the Week for his performance. The following week against the Miami Dolphins, Wilson suffered a concussion during the second quarter and did not return. He was later ruled out for the remainder of the season.

=== Denver Broncos ===
On April 23, 2024, the Denver Broncos announced that they had acquired Wilson and a 2024 seventh-round pick (No. 256; Nick Gargiulo) from the Jets in exchange for a 2024 sixth-round pick (No. 203; the Minnesota Vikings selected Will Reichard). The Broncos declined the fifth-year option on Wilson's contract, making him a free agent after the 2024 season. Denver announced that Wilson would begin the season as the team’s third-string quarterback, behind Bo Nix and Jarrett Stidham. He did not appear in a game during the season.

=== Miami Dolphins ===
On March 17, 2025, Wilson signed a one-year, $6 million contract with the Miami Dolphins. Wilson appeared in four games for Miami, completing six of his 11 pass attempts for 32 yards.

=== New Orleans Saints ===
On March 26, 2026, Wilson signed a one-year, $1.4 million contract with the New Orleans Saints.

== Career statistics ==
=== NFL ===
Legend
	Led the league
**Bold**	Career high

Year	Team	Games			Passing									Rushing					Sacks		Fumbles	
Year	Team	GP	GS	Record	Cmp	Att	Pct	Yds	Y/A	Lng	TD	Int	Rtg	Att	Yds	Y/A	Lng	TD	Sck	Yds	Fum	Lost
2021	NYJ	**13**	**13**	3–10	213	**383**	55.6	**2,334**	6.1	54	**9**	**11**	69.7	29	185	**6.4**	**52**	**4**	44	**370**	5	1
2022	NYJ	9	9	**5–4**	132	242	54.5	1,688	**7.0**	**79**	6	7	72.8	28	102	3.6	18	1	23	175	1	1
2023	NYJ	12	11	4–7	**221**	368	**60.1**	2,271	6.2	68	8	7	**77.2**	**36**	**211**	5.9	20	0	**46**	340	**11**	**7** (Note: Tied with Joshua Dobbs, Trevor Lawrence, and Desmond Ridder.)
2024	DEN	0	0	—	DNP																	
2025	MIA	4	0	—	6	11	54.5	32	2.9	11	0	0	60.0	3	1	0.3	3	0	0	0	0	0
Career		38	33	12–21	572	1,004	57.0	6,325	6.3	79	23	25	73.1	96	499	5.2	52	5	113	885	17	9

=== College ===
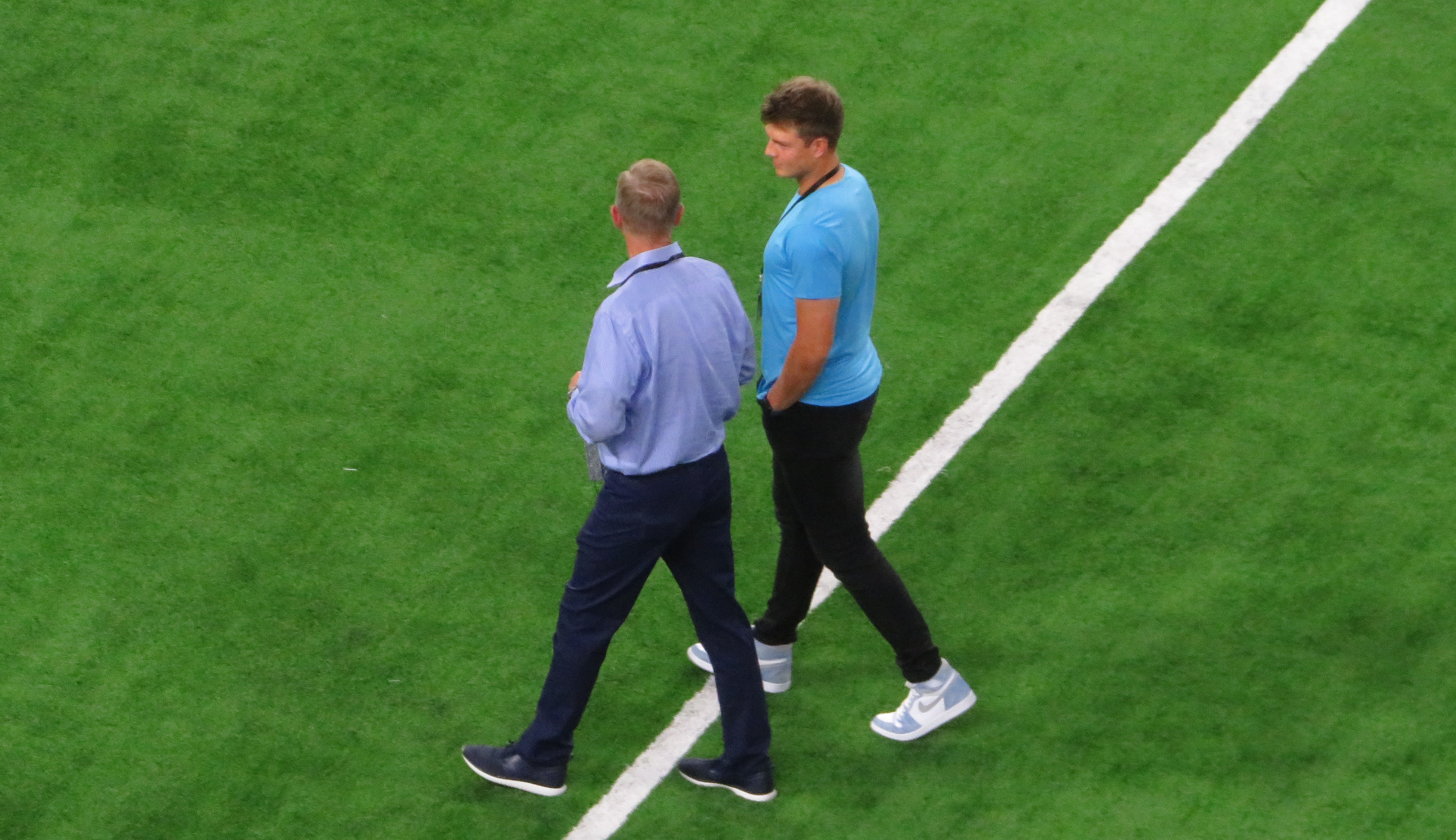
Wilson (right) speaking to BYU athletic director Tom Holmoe in 2021

Season	Team	Games		Passing							Rushing			
Season	Team	GP	GS	Cmp	Att	Pct	Yds	TD	Int	Rtg	Att	Yds	Avg	TD
2018	BYU	9	7	120	182	65.9	1,578	12	**3**	157.2	**75**	221	2.9	2
2019	BYU	9	9	199	319	62.4	2,382	11	9	130.8	68	186	2.7	3
2020	BYU	**12**	**12**	**247**	**336**	**73.5**	**3,692**	**33**	**3**	**196.4**	72	**286**	**4.0**	**10**
Career		30	28	566	837	67.6	7,652	56	15	162.9	215	693	3.2	15

== Personal life ==
Wilson was born to Michael and Lisa Wilson (née Neeleman) and has three brothers, one of whom is college quarterback Isaac Wilson, and two sisters. He is part Hawaiian on his father's side, with his middle name Kapono meaning "righteous" in the Hawaiian language. Some other members of his family include airline entrepreneur David Neeleman and HealthEquity co-founder Stephen Neeleman.

Wilson was diagnosed with attention deficit hyperactivity disorder (ADHD) as a child, a trait that runs in his family. Wilson was baptized as a member of the Church of Jesus Christ of Latter-day Saints. He has said that he "didn't grow up active in the church [and] was never really a churchgoer..." He considers himself a spiritual person, telling Deseret News "I have always had a good relationship with God in my life."

Wilson has been friends with former BYU Cougars teammate Dax Milne since childhood.

In June 2024, Wilson announced his engagement to girlfriend Nicolette Dellanno. On June 28, 2025, Wilson and Dellanno were married in New York City.
