= 2022 New York Jets season =

63rd season in franchise history

- Owner: Woody and Christopher Johnson
- General manager: Joe Douglas
- Head coach: Robert Saleh
- Home stadium: MetLife Stadium

Results
- Record: 7–10
- Division place: 4th AFC East
- Playoffs: Did not qualify
- All-Pros: CB Sauce Gardner (1st team); LB C.J. Mosley (2nd team); DT Quinnen Williams (1st team)
- Pro Bowlers: CB Sauce Gardner; ST Justin Hardee; LB C.J. Mosley; DT Quinnen Williams

Uniform
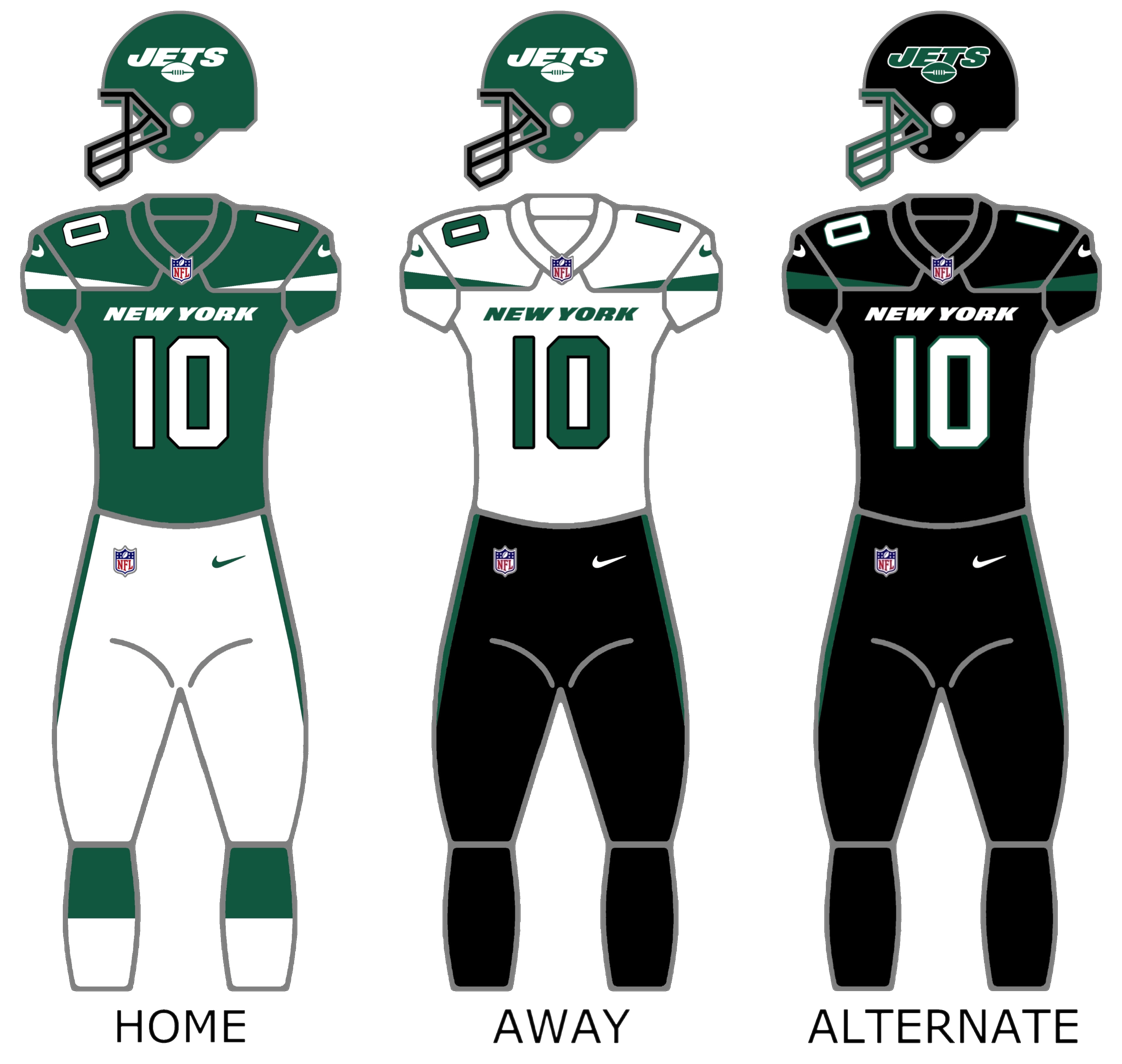

The 2022 season was the New York Jets' 53rd in the National Football League (NFL), their 63rd overall, their fourth under general manager Joe Douglas and their second under head coach Robert Saleh.

The team raced out to a strong start, and with a Week 7 victory over the Denver Broncos, they improved on their 4–13 record from 2021. However, despite starting 7–4 on the year, the Jets suffered a late-season collapse. Their playoff hopes were dashed as none of the quarterbacks could keep up and they fell into a brutal six-game losing streak, while also failing to score a touchdown in their final three games, and were eliminated from playoff contention for the 12th consecutive season after a Week 17 loss to the Seattle Seahawks as well as clinching their seventh consecutive losing season. A loss to the Miami Dolphins the following week led to the Jets finishing with a 7–10 record, which clinched New York's third consecutive season with double-digit losses.

Despite poor offensive performances led by quarterback Zach Wilson and scoring less than 7 points in each of their final three games of the season, the defense made major improvements, ranking fourth in defense in terms of both scoring and yardage, allowing a total of only 316 points and total of 5,288 yards (3,220 passing, 2,068 rushing). The Jets also became the third team to win both Offensive Rookie of the Year and Defensive Rookie of the Year in the same season, with first-round picks Garrett Wilson and Sauce Gardner respectively achieving the awards.

== Draft ==
2022 New York Jets Draft
Round	Selection	Player	Position	College	Notes
1	4	Sauce Gardner	CB	Cincinnati	
1	10	Garrett Wilson	WR	Ohio State	from Seattle (Note: The Jets traded S Jamal Adams and a fourth-round selection (109th overall) to the Seattle Seahawks in exchange for S Bradley McDougald, a first-round selection (10th overall), and 2021 first- and third-round selections.)
1	26	Jermaine Johnson II	DE	Florida State	from Tennessee (Note: The Jets traded second-, third- and fifth-round selections (35th, 69th, and 163rd overall) to the Tennessee Titans in exchange for first- and third-round selections (26th and 101st overall).)
2	35	Traded to Tennessee			
2	36	Breece Hall	RB	Iowa State	from NY Giants (Note: The Jets traded second- and fifth-round selections (38th and 146th overall) to the New York Giants in exchange for a second-round selection (36th overall).)
2	38	Traded to the New York Giants			from Carolina (Note: The Jets traded QB Sam Darnold to the Carolina Panthers in exchange for second- and fourth-round selections (38th and 111th overall), and a 2021 sixth-round selection.)
3	69	Traded to Tennessee			
3	101	Jeremy Ruckert	TE	Ohio State	2020 Resolution JC-2A selection; from New Orleans via Philadelphia and Tennessee
4	109	Traded to Seattle			
4	111	Max Mitchell	OT	Louisiana	from Carolina
4	117	Micheal Clemons	DE	Texas A&M	from Minnesota (Note: The Jets traded TE Chris Herndon and a sixth-round selection (184th overall) to the Minnesota Vikings in exchange for a fourth-round selection (117th overall).)
5	146	Traded to the New York Giants			
5	163	Traded to Tennessee			from Pittsburgh (Note: The Jets traded LB Avery Williamson and a seventh-round selection to the Pittsburgh Steelers in exchange for a fifth-round selection (163rd overall).)
6	184	Traded to Minnesota			
6	206	Traded to Philadelphia (Note: The Jets traded a conditional sixth-round selection (206th overall) to the Philadelphia Eagles in exchange for QB Joe Flacco. The pick would have been elevated to the fifth round if Flacco had met playing time conditions.)			from Tampa Bay (Note: The Jets traded NT Steve McLendon and a 2023 seventh-round selection to the Tampa Bay Buccaneers in exchange for a sixth-round selection (206th overall).)
6	207	Traded to Houston (Note: The Jets traded a sixth-round selection (207th overall) to the Houston Texans in exchange for LB Shaq Lawson.)			from San Francisco (Note: The Jets traded LB Jordan Willis and a 2021 seventh-round selection to the San Francisco 49ers in exchange for a sixth-round selection (207th overall).)
7	225	Traded to Pittsburgh			

Draft trades

2022 New York Jets undrafted free agents
Name	Position	College	Ref.
Keshunn Abram	WR	Kent State	
Tony Adams	S	Illinois	
Irvin Charles	WR	IUP	
Calvin Jackson	WR	Washington State	
Zonovan Knight	RB	NC State	
DQ Thomas	LB	Middle Tennessee	

== Staff ==
2022 New York Jets staff
Front office: Owner/chairman/CEO – Woody Johnson; Vice chairman – Christopher Johnson; President – Hymie Elhai; Executive vice president/COO – Brian Friedman; General manager – Joe Douglas; Assistant general manager – Rex Hogan; Senior director of football administration – Dave Socie; Director of player personnel – Chad Alexander; Director of pro personnel – Greg Nejmeh; Assistant director of pro personnel – Kevin Murphy; Director of college scouting – Jon Carr; Senior football advisor – Phil Savage; Head coaches: Head coach – Robert Saleh; Offensive coaches: Offensive coordinator – Mike LaFleur; Quarterbacks – Rob Calabrese; Running backs – Taylor Embree; Wide receivers – Vacant; Tight ends – Ron Middleton; Offensive line/run game coordinator – John Benton; Assistant offensive line – Ben Wilkerson; Offensive assistant – Mack Brown; Offensive assistant – Billy VandeMerkt	Defensive coaches: Defensive coordinator – Jeff Ulbrich; Defensive line – Aaron Whitecotton; Assistant defensive line – Greg Scruggs; Linebackers – Mike Rutenberg; Senior defensive assistant/cornerbacks – Tony Oden; Defensive backs/safeties – Marquand Manuel; Defensive assistant – Ricky Manning Jr; Defensive assistant – Nathaniel Willingham; Special teams coaches: Special teams coordinator – Brant Boyer; Special teams assistant – Michael Ghobrial; Special teams assistant – Leon Washington; Strength and conditioning: Head strength and conditioning – Justus Galac; Assistant strength and conditioning – Joe Giacobbe; Assistant strength and conditioning – Aaron McLaurin

== Final roster ==
2022 New York Jets roster
Quarterbacks (QB): 19 Joe Flacco; 5 Mike White; 2 Zach Wilson; Running backs (RB): 32 Michael Carter; 25 Ty Johnson; 27 Zonovan Knight; 23 James Robinson; Wide receivers (WR): 10 Braxton Berrios; 84 Corey Davis; 11 Denzel Mims; 8 Elijah Moore; 17 Garrett Wilson; Tight ends (TE): 83 Tyler Conklin; 89 Jeremy Ruckert; 87 C. J. Uzomah; 88 Kenny Yeboah	Offensive linemen (OL): 71 Duane Brown T; 63 Laurent Duvernay-Tardif G; 76 George Fant T; 67 Dan Feeney C; 65 Nate Herbig G; 60 Connor McGovern C; 70 Cedric Ogbuehi T; 68 Mike Remmers T; 78 Laken Tomlinson G; Defensive linemen (DL): 72 Micheal Clemons DE; 99 Vinny Curry DE; 91 John Franklin-Myers DE; 52 Jermaine Johnson II DE; 58 Carl Lawson DE; 98 Sheldon Rankins DT; 97 Nathan Shepherd DT; 94 Solomon Thomas DT; 95 Quinnen Williams DT	Linebackers (LB): 9 Kwon Alexander OLB; 47 Bryce Huff OLB; 57 C. J. Mosley MLB; 45 Hamsah Nasirildeen OLB; 44 Jamien Sherwood MLB; 56 Quincy Williams OLB; Defensive backs (DB): 22 Tony Adams FS; 30 Michael Carter II CB; 21 Ashtyn Davis FS; 26 Brandin Echols CB; 1 Sauce Gardner CB; 37 Bryce Hall CB; 34 Justin Hardee CB; 29 Lamarcus Joyner FS; 4 D. J. Reed CB; 3 Jordan Whitehead SS; Special teams (ST): 42 Thomas Hennessy LS; 7 Braden Mann P; 6 Greg Zuerlein K	Practice squad: 50 Bradlee Anae DE; 82 Irvin Charles WR; 64 Chris Glaser G; 36 Marcell Harris OLB (PS/I); 31 Craig James CB; 33 Jimmy Moreland CB; 62 Adam Pankey T; 39 Will Parks SS; 63 Sam Schlueter T; 79 Tanzel Smart DT; 66 Eric Smith T; 85 Diontae Spencer WR; 51 Marquiss Spencer OLB; 15 Chris Streveler QB; 55 Chazz Surratt OLB; 86 Malik Taylor WR; Reserve: 48 Nick Bawden FB (IR); 77 Mekhi Becton T (IR); 20 Breece Hall RB (IR); 61 Max Mitchell T (NF-Inj.); 68 Dru Samia G (PUP); 64 Greg Senat T (NF-Inj.); 16 Jeff Smith WR (IR); 75 Alijah Vera-Tucker G (IR); Rookies in italics 53 active, 8 reserve, 15 practice squad (1 exempt)

== Preseason ==
The Jets' preseason opponents and schedule were announced on May 12.

Week	Date	Opponent	Result	Record	Venue	Recap
1	August 12	at Philadelphia Eagles	W 24–21	1–0	Lincoln Financial Field	Recap
2	August 22	Atlanta Falcons	W 24–16	2–0	MetLife Stadium	Recap
3	August 28	New York Giants	W 31–27	3–0	MetLife Stadium	Recap

== Regular season ==
=== Schedule ===
Week	Date	Opponent	Result	Record	Venue	Recap
1	September 11	Baltimore Ravens	**L** 9–24	0–1	MetLife Stadium	Recap
2	September 18	at Cleveland Browns	**W** 31–30	1–1	FirstEnergy Stadium	Recap
3	September 25	Cincinnati Bengals	**L** 12–27	1–2	MetLife Stadium	Recap
4	October 2	at Pittsburgh Steelers	**W** 24–20	2–2	Acrisure Stadium	Recap
5	October 9	**Miami Dolphins**	**W** 40–17	3–2	MetLife Stadium	Recap
6	October 16	at Green Bay Packers	**W** 27–10	4–2	Lambeau Field	Recap
7	October 23	at Denver Broncos	**W** 16–9	5–2	Empower Field at Mile High	Recap
8	October 30	**New England Patriots**	**L** 17–22	5–3	MetLife Stadium	Recap
9	November 6	**Buffalo Bills**	**W** 20–17	6–3	MetLife Stadium	Recap
10	Bye					
11	November 20	at **New England Patriots**	**L** 3–10	6–4	Gillette Stadium	Recap
12	November 27	Chicago Bears	**W** 31–10	7–4	MetLife Stadium	Recap
13	December 4	at Minnesota Vikings	**L** 22–27	7–5	U.S. Bank Stadium	Recap
14	December 11	at **Buffalo Bills**	**L** 12–20	7–6	Highmark Stadium	Recap
15	December 18	Detroit Lions	**L** 17–20	7–7	MetLife Stadium	Recap
16	December 22	Jacksonville Jaguars	**L** 3–19	7–8	MetLife Stadium	Recap
17	January 1	at Seattle Seahawks	**L** 6–23	7–9	Lumen Field	Recap
18	January 8	at **Miami Dolphins**	**L** 6–11	7–10	Hard Rock Stadium	Recap

Note: Intra-division opponents are in bold text.

=== Game summaries ===
==== Week 1: vs. Baltimore Ravens ====
Week 1: Baltimore Ravens at New York Jets – Game summary

Quarter	1	2	3	4	Total
**Ravens**	3	7	14	0	**24**
Jets	0	3	0	6	**9**

at MetLife Stadium, East Rutherford, New Jersey

- Date: September 11
- Game time: 1:00 p.m. EDT
- Game weather: Rain, 73 °F (23 °C)
- Game attendance: 78,827
- Referee: Craig Wrolstad
- TV announcers (CBS): Andrew Catalon, James Lofton and Michael Grady
- Recap, Game Book

Game information

**First quarter**

- BAL – Justin Tucker 24-yard field goal, 3:16. Ravens 3–0. **Drive: 4 plays, 7 yards, 1:30.**

**Second quarter**

- BAL – Devin Duvernay 25-yard pass from Lamar Jackson (Justin Tucker kick), 3:45. Ravens 10–0. **Drive: 3 plays, 62 yards, 0:56.**
- NYJ – Greg Zuerlein 45-yard field goal, 0:24. Ravens 10–3. **Drive: 8 plays, 48 yards, 3:21.**

**Third quarter**

- BAL – Devin Duvernay 17-yard pass from Lamar Jackson (Justin Tucker kick), 7:14. Ravens 17–3. **Drive: 6 plays, 44 yards, 3:10.**
- BAL – Rashod Bateman 55-yard pass from Lamar Jackson (Justin Tucker kick), 2:06. Ravens 24–3. **Drive: 5 plays, 88 yards, 2:31.**

**Fourth quarter**

- NYJ – Tyler Conklin 3-yard pass from Joe Flacco (kick failed), 1:00. Ravens 24–9. **Drive: 11 plays, 43 yards, 1:42.**

**Top passers**

- BAL – Lamar Jackson – 17/30, 213 yards, 3 TD, INT
- NYJ – Joe Flacco – 37/59, 307 yards, TD, INT

**Top rushers**

- BAL – Kenyan Drake – 11 rushes, 31 yards
- NYJ – Michael Carter – 10 rushes, 60 yards

**Top receivers**

- BAL – Rashod Bateman – 2 receptions, 59 yards, TD
- NYJ – Corey Davis – 6 receptions, 77 yards

After a somewhat slow start, the Ravens outscored the Jets, who were led by former Ravens QB Joe Flacco, 21–3 in the 2nd and 3rd quarters en route to a 24–9 season opening victory. Lamar Jackson threw for 213 yards, three touchdowns, and an interception; the first two touchdowns went to Devin Duvernay while the third one was caught by Rashod Bateman. Flacco threw for 307 yards, a touchdown, and an interception in a losing effort. This was Jets' fourth straight season opening loss.

==== Week 2: at Cleveland Browns ====
Week 2: New York Jets at Cleveland Browns – Game summary

Quarter	1	2	3	4	Total
**Jets**	0	14	0	17	**31**
Browns	7	7	3	13	**30**

at FirstEnergy Stadium, Cleveland, Ohio

- Date: September 18
- Game time: 1:00 p.m. EDT
- Game weather: Sunny, 80 °F (27 °C)
- Game attendance: 67,431
- Referee: Tra Blake
- TV announcers (CBS): Spero Dedes, Jay Feely, and Aditi Kinkhabwala
- Recap, Game Book

Game information

**First quarter**

- CLE – Nick Chubb 4-yard run (Cade York kick), 4:55. Browns 7–0. **Drive: 14 plays, 90 yards, 8:37.**

**Second quarter**

- NYJ – Garrett Wilson 2-yard pass from Joe Flacco (Greg Zuerlein kick), 13:06. Tied 7–7. **Drive: 13 plays, 75 yards, 6:49.**
- CLE – Amari Cooper 6-yard pass from Jacoby Brissett (Cade York kick), 8:17. Browns 14–7. **Drive: 10 plays, 61 yards, 4:49.**
- NYJ – Breece Hall 10-yard pass from Joe Flacco (Greg Zuerlein kick), 0:11. Tied 14–14. **Drive: 8 plays, 54 yards, 0:54.**

**Third quarter**

- CLE – Cade York 22-yard field goal, 9:58. Browns 17–14. **Drive: 11 plays, 76 yards, 5:02.**

**Fourth quarter**

- NYJ – Greg Zuerlein 57-yard field goal, 14:19. Tied 17–17. **Drive: 9 plays, 51 yards, 4:45.**
- CLE – Nick Chubb 7-yard run (Cade York kick), 9:21. Browns 24–17. **Drive: 9 plays, 75 yards, 4:58.**
- CLE – Nick Chubb 12-yard run (kick failed), 1:55. Browns 30–17. **Drive: 6 plays, 42 yards, 0:35.**
- NYJ – Corey Davis 66-yard pass from Joe Flacco (Greg Zuerlein kick), 1:22. Browns 30–24. **Drive: 2 plays, 75 yards, 0:33.**
- NYJ – Garrett Wilson 15-yard pass from Joe Flacco (Greg Zuerlein kick), 0:22. Jets 31–30. **Drive: 9 plays, 53 yards, 1:00.**

**Top passers**

- NYJ – Joe Flacco – 26/44, 307 yards, 4 TD
- CLE – Jacoby Brissett – 22/27, 229 yards, TD, INT

**Top rushers**

- NYJ – Breece Hall – 7 rushes, 50 yards
- CLE – Nick Chubb – 17 rushes, 87 yards, 3 TD

**Top receivers**

- NYJ – Garrett Wilson – 8 receptions, 102 yards, 2 TD
- CLE – Amari Cooper – 9 receptions, 101 yards, TD

Nick Chubb scored a touchdown with 1:55 remaining in the fourth quarter and the Jets didn't have any timeouts. The Browns had a 99.9% chance of winning at that point. Two plays later Joe Flacco connected with a wide open Corey Davis to cut the lead to 6 points. The Jets recovered the onside kick and scored the game winning touchdown 9 plays later and won 31–30.

Garrett Wilson scored 2 touchdowns, including the game winner, in his NFL debut.

==== Week 3: vs. Cincinnati Bengals ====
Week 3: Cincinnati Bengals at New York Jets – Game summary

Quarter	1	2	3	4	Total
**Bengals**	14	6	7	0	**27**
Jets	6	3	3	0	**12**

at MetLife Stadium, East Rutherford, New Jersey

- Date: September 25
- Game time: 1:00 p.m. EDT
- Game weather: Mostly cloudy, 66 °F (19 °C)
- Game attendance: 73,708
- Referee: Jerome Boger
- TV announcers (CBS): Ian Eagle, Charles Davis and Evan Washburn
- Recap, Game Book

Game information

**First quarter**

- CIN – Samaje Perine 12-yard pass from Joe Burrow (Evan McPherson kick), 9:35. Bengals 7–0. **Drive: 11 plays, 75 yards, 5:25.**
- NYJ – Greg Zuerlein 50-yard field goal, 5:04. Bengals 7–3. **Drive: 9 plays, 43 yards, 4:31.**
- NYJ – Greg Zuerlein 40-yard field goal, 1:49. Bengals 7–6. **Drive: 5 plays, 21 yards, 1:26.**
- CIN – Tyler Boyd 56-yard pass from Joe Burrow (Evan McPherson kick), 0:00. Bengals 14–6. **Drive: 5 plays, 75 yards, 1:49.**

**Second quarter**

- CIN – Evan McPherson 22-yard field goal, 7:48. Bengals 17–6. **Drive: 7 plays, 71 yards, 2:25.**
- CIN – Evan McPherson 43-yard field goal, 5:28. Bengals 20–6. **Drive: 4 plays, 0 yards, 0:58.**
- NYJ – Greg Zuerlein 52-yard field goal, 0:00. Bengals 20–9. **Drive: 6 plays, 13 yards, 0:30.**

**Third quarter**

- CIN – Ja'Marr Chase 5-yard pass from Joe Burrow (Evan McPherson kick), 12:02. Bengals 27–9. **Drive: 4 plays, 24 yards, 2:06.**
- NYJ – Greg Zuerlein 43-yard field goal, 0:41. Bengals 27–12. **Drive: 12 plays, 55 yards, 3:32.**

**Fourth quarter**

- No scoring plays.

**Top passers**

- CIN – Joe Burrow – 23/36, 275 yards, 3 TD
- NYJ – Joe Flacco – 28/52, 285 yards, 2 INT

**Top rushers**

- CIN – Samaje Perine – 9 rushes, 47 yards
- NYJ – Michael Carter – 11 rushes, 39 yards

**Top receivers**

- CIN – Jamarr Chase – 6 receptions, 29 yards, TD
- NYJ – Tyler Conklin – 8 receptions, 84 yards

Joe Burrow threw for 3 touchdowns as the Bengals won 27–12.

==== Week 4: at Pittsburgh Steelers ====
Week 4: New York Jets at Pittsburgh Steelers – Game summary

Quarter	1	2	3	4	Total
**Jets**	3	7	0	14	**24**
Steelers	0	6	7	7	**20**

at Heinz Field, Pittsburgh, Pennsylvania

- Date: October 2
- Game time: 1:00 p.m. EDT
- Game weather: Cloudy, 58 °F (14 °C)
- Game attendance: 66,578
- Referee: Brad Rogers
- TV announcers (CBS): Greg Gumbel, Adam Archuleta and AJ Ross
- Recap, Game Book

Game information

**First quarter**

- NYJ – Greg Zuerlein 38-yard field goal, 4:03. Jets 3–0. **Drive: 7 plays, 16 yards, 3:32.**

**Second quarter**

- NYJ – Zach Wilson 2-yard pass from Braxton Berrios (Greg Zuerlein kick), 12:37. Jets 10–0. **Drive: 9 plays, 70 yards, 4:28.**
- PIT – Chris Boswell 51-yard pass field goal, 8:30. Jets 10–3. **Drive: 10 plays, 42 yards, 4:07.**
- PIT – Chris Boswell 59-yard pass field goal, 0:00. Jets 10–6. **Drive: 3 plays, 29 yards, 0:20.**

**Third quarter**

- PIT – Kenny Pickett 1-yard run (Chris Boswell kick), 7:18. Steelers 13–10. **Drive: 3 plays, 4 yards, 1:27.**

**Fourth quarter**

- PIT – Kenny Pickett 2-yard run (Chris Boswell kick), 13:36. Steelers 20–10. **Drive: 12 plays, 82 yards, 6:31.**
- NYJ – Corey Davis 5-yard pass from Zach Wilson (Greg Zuerlein kick), 7:31. Steelers 20–17. **Drive: 11 plays, 81 yards, 6:05.**
- NYJ – Breece Hall 2-yard run (Greg Zuerlein kick), 0:16. Jets 24–20. **Drive: 10 plays, 65 yards, 3:18.**

**Top passers**

- NYJ – Zach Wilson – 18/36, 252 yards, TD, 2 INT
- PIT – Kenny Pickett – 10/13, 120 yards, 3 INT

**Top rushers**

- NYJ – Breece Hall – 17 rushes, 66 yards, TD
- PIT – Najee Harris – 18 rushes, 74 yards

**Top receivers**

- NYJ – Corey Davis – 5 receptions, 74 yards, TD
- PIT – Pat Freiermuth – 7 receptions, 85 yards

In Zach Wilson's return after a preseason meniscus injury, the Jets went up 10–0 on Pittsburgh, before falling behind 20–10 after Steelers quarterback Mitch Trubisky was benched for rookie Kenny Pickett; however, the Jets would mount two touchdown drives late in the fourth quarter, with Pickett throwing two interceptions, to take a 24–20 comeback victory.

This was the Jets' second-ever win in the state of Pennsylvania, having previously gone a combined 1–16 against the Steelers and Philadelphia Eagles.

==== Week 5: vs. Miami Dolphins ====
Week 5: Miami Dolphins at New York Jets – Game summary

Quarter	1	2	3	4	Total
Dolphins	0	14	3	0	**17**
**Jets**	5	14	0	21	**40**

at MetLife Stadium, East Rutherford, New Jersey

- Date: October 9
- Game time: 1:00 p.m. EDT
- Game weather: Sunny and windy, 63 °F (17 °C)
- Game attendance: 82,500
- Referee: Clay Martin
- TV announcers (CBS): Kevin Harlan, Trent Green and Melanie Collins
- Recap, Game Book

Game information

**First quarter**

- NYJ – Teddy Bridgewater intentional grounding in endzone for a safety, 12:47. Jets 2–0.
- NYJ – Greg Zuerlein 34-yard field goal, 3:07. Jets 5–0. **Drive: 7 plays, 56 yards, 3:32.**

**Second quarter**

- NYJ – Michael Carter 1-yard run (Greg Zuerlein kick), 14:56. Jets 12–0. **Drive: 2 plays, 80 yards, 0:56.**
- MIA – Raheem Mostert 12-yard run (Jason Sanders kick), 9:55. Jets 12–7. **Drive: 8 plays, 75 yards, 5:01.**
- NYJ – Zach Wilson 5-yard run (Greg Zuerlein kick), 2:38. Jets 19–7. **Drive: 9 plays, 53 yards, 5:22.**
- MIA – Durham Smythe 1-yard run (Jason Sanders kick), 0:04. Jets 19–14. **Drive: 11 plays, 75 yards, 2:34.**

**Third quarter**

- MIA – Jason Sanders 46-yard field goal, 8:40. Jets 19–17. **Drive: 11 plays, 47 yards, 6:20.**

**Fourth quarter**

- NYJ – Michael Carter 1-yard run (Greg Zuerlein kick), 9:22. Jets 26–17. **Drive: 7 plays, 56 yards, 3:53.**
- NYJ – Breece Hall 1-yard run (Greg Zuerlein kick), 9:08. Jets 33–17. **Drive: 1 play, 5 yards, 0:05.**
- NYJ – Braxton Berrios 15-yard run (Greg Zuerlein kick), 4:24. Jets 40–17. **Drive: 5 plays, 30 yards, 3:07.**

**Top passers**

- MIA – Skylar Thompson – 19/33, 166 yards, INT
- NYJ – Zach Wilson – 14/21, 210 yards

**Top rushers**

- MIA – Raheem Mostert – 18 rushes, 113 yards, TD
- NYJ – Breece Hall – 18 rushes, 97 yards, TD

**Top receivers**

- MIA – Tyreek Hill – 7 receptions, 47 yards
- NYJ – Breece Hall – 2 receptions, 100 yards

The Jets scored 40 points for the first time since Week 1 of 2018 and just the third time in the past decade, and snapped a 12-game losing streak against divisional opponents dating back to Week 17 of the 2019 season.

This win also marked the first time the Jets recorded a winning percentage over .500 since week 1 of 2018.

==== Week 6: at Green Bay Packers ====
Week 6: New York Jets at Green Bay Packers – Game summary

Quarter	1	2	3	4	Total
**Jets**	0	3	14	10	**27**
Packers	0	3	7	0	**10**

at Lambeau Field, Green Bay, Wisconsin

- Date: October 16
- Game time: 1:00 p.m. EDT/12:00 p.m. CDT
- Game weather: Cloudy, 49 °F (9 °C)
- Game attendance: 78,343
- Referee: Clete Blakeman
- TV announcers (Fox): Kevin Burkhardt, Greg Olsen, Erin Andrews and Tom Rinaldi
- Recap, Game Book

Game information

**First quarter**

- No scoring plays.

**Second quarter**

- NYJ – Greg Zuerlein 32-yard field goal, 5:46. Jets 3–0. **Drive: 6 plays, 20 yards, 2:58.**
- GB – Mason Crosby 29-yard field goal, 9:55. Tied 3–3. **Drive: 6 plays, 46 yards, 0:31.**

**Third quarter**

- NYJ – Braxton Berrios 20-yard run (Greg Zuerlein kick), 8:11. Jets 10–3. **Drive: 4 plays, 74 yards, 2:10.**
- NYJ – Will Parks 20-yard return of blocked punt (Greg Zuerlein kick), 5:43. Jets 17–3.

**Fourth quarter**

- GB – Allen Lazard 25-yard pass from Aaron Rodgers (Mason Crosby kick), 2:35. Jets 17–10. **Drive: 6 plays, 75 yards, 3:08.**
- NYJ – Breece Hall 34-yard run (Greg Zuerlein kick), 14:52. Jets 24–10. **Drive: 5 play, 66 yards, 2:43.**
- NYJ – Greg Zuerlein 23-yard field goal, 2:34. Jets 27–10. **Drive: 13 plays, 58 yards, 6:38.**

**Top passers**

- NYJ – Zach Wilson – 10/18, 110 yards
- GB – Aaron Rodgers – 26/41, 246 yards, TD

**Top rushers**

- NYJ – Breece Hall – 20 rushes, 116 yards, TD
- GB – A. J. Dillon – 10 rushes, 41 yards

**Top receivers**

- NYJ – Corey Davis – 2 receptions, 52 yards
- GB – Robert Tonyan – 10 receptions, 90 yards

This win marked the first time the Jets had defeated the Packers led by Aaron Rodgers (having previously been 0–3), and was their first victory over Green Bay since 2006.

==== Week 7: at Denver Broncos ====
Week 7: New York Jets at Denver Broncos – Game summary

Quarter	1	2	3	4	Total
**Jets**	7	3	0	6	**16**
Broncos	6	3	0	0	**9**

at Empower Field at Mile High, Denver, Colorado

- Date: October 23
- Game time: 4:05 p.m. EDT/2:05 p.m. MDT
- Game weather: 64 °F (18 °C)
- Game attendance: 76,624
- Referee: Bill Vinovich
- TV announcers (CBS): Ian Eagle, Charles Davis and Evan Washburn
- Recap, Game Book

Game information

**First quarter**

- NYJ – Breece Hall 62-yard run (Greg Zuerlein kick), 7:34. Jets 7–0. **Drive: 3 plays, 73 yards, 1:06.**
- DEN – Latavius Murray 2-yard run (kick failed, wide right), 1:33. Jets 7–6. **Drive: 13 plays, 75 yards, 6:01.**

**Second quarter**

- DEN – Brandon McManus 44-yard field goal, 3:37. Broncos 9–7. **Drive: 11 plays, 73 yards, 6:05.**
- NYJ – Greg Zuerlein 45-yard field goal, 0:00. Jets 10–9. **Drive: 10 plays, 48 yards, 3:37.**

**Third quarter**

- No scoring plays.

**Fourth quarter**

- NYJ – Greg Zuerlein 33-yard field goal, 12:49. Jets 13–9. **Drive: 7 plays, 21 yards, 3:35.**
- NYJ – Greg Zuerlein 40-yard field goal, 4:35. Jets 16–9. **Drive: 10 plays, 50 yards, 6:12.**

**Top passers**

- NYJ – Zach Wilson – 16/26, 121 yards
- DEN – Brett Rypien – 24/46, 225 yards, INT

**Top rushers**

- NYJ – Breece Hall – 4 rushes, 72 yards, TD
- DEN – Melvin Gordon – 11 rushes, 33 yards

**Top receivers**

- NYJ – Michael Carter – 2 receptions, 45 yards
- DEN – Jerry Jeudy – 7 receptions, 96 yards

Rookie RB Breece Hall left the game with a knee injury which turned out to be an ACL tear which lead him to miss the rest of the season.

==== Week 8: vs. New England Patriots ====
Week 8: New England Patriots at New York Jets – Game summary

Quarter	1	2	3	4	Total
**Patriots**	3	3	13	3	**22**
Jets	3	7	0	7	**17**

at MetLife Stadium, East Rutherford, New Jersey

- Date: October 30
- Game time: 1:00 p.m. EDT
- Game weather: Mostly sunny, 59 °F (15 °C)
- Game attendance: 82,823
- Referee: Shawn Smith
- TV announcers (CBS): Ian Eagle, Charles Davis and Evan Washburn
- Recap, Game Book

Game information

**First quarter**

- NYJ – Greg Zuerlein 28-yard field goal, 8:14. Jets 3–0. **Drive: 10 plays, 82 yards, 4:29.**
- NE – Nick Folk 31-yard field goal, 0:00. Tied 3–3. **Drive: 15 plays, 62 yards, 8:14.**

**Second quarter**

- NYJ – Tyler Conklin 8-yard pass from Zach Wilson (Greg Zuerlein kick), 12:00. Jets 10–3. **Drive: 6 plays, 72 yards, 3:00.**
- NE – Nick Folk 42-yard field goal, 0:00. Jets 10–6. **Drive: 5 plays, 16 yards, 0:42.**

**Third quarter**

- NE – Jakobi Meyers 5-yard pass from Mac Jones (Nick Folk kick), 12:07. Patriots 13–10. **Drive: 6 plays, 62 yards, 2:53.**
- NE – Nick Folk 49-yard field goal, 5:23. Patriots 16–10. **Drive: 10 plays, 34 yards, 4:06.**
- NE – Nick Folk 45-yard field goal, 2:39. Patriots 19–10. **Drive: 4 plays, 0 yards, 1:10.**

**Fourth quarter**

- NE – Nick Folk 52-yard field goal, 10:35. Patriots 22–10. **Drive: 4 plays, 4 yards, 1:23.**
- NYJ – Tyler Conklin 9-yard pass from Zach Wilson (Greg Zuerlein kick), 1:51. Patriots 22–17. **Drive: 6 plays, 88 yards, 1:44.**

**Top passers**

- NE – Mac Jones – 24/35, 194 yards, TD, INT
- NYJ – Zach Wilson – 20/41, 355 yards, 2 TD, 3 INT

**Top rushers**

- NE – Rhamondre Stevenson – 16 rushes, 71 yards
- NYJ – Michael Carter – 7 rushes, 26 yards

**Top receivers**

- NE – Jakobi Meyers – 9 receptions, 60 yards, TD
- NYJ – Garrett Wilson – 6 receptions, 115 yards

Zach Wilson threw a career high 355 passing yards and 2 touchdowns, but threw 3 picks and ended the Jets 4 game winning streak. It also extended the Jets losing streak against the Patriots to 13 games.

==== Week 9: vs. Buffalo Bills ====
Week 9: Buffalo Bills at New York Jets – Game summary

Quarter	1	2	3	4	Total
Bills	7	7	0	3	**17**
**Jets**	3	7	7	3	**20**

at MetLife Stadium, East Rutherford, New Jersey

- Date: November 6
- Game time: 1:00 p.m. EST
- Game weather: Warm and overcast, 76 °F (24 °C)
- Game attendance: 83,135
- Referee: Land Clark
- TV announcers (CBS): Ian Eagle, Charles Davis and Evan Washburn
- Recap, Game Book

Game information

**First quarter**

- BUF – Josh Allen 1-yard run (Tyler Bass kick), 4:39. Bills 7–0. **Drive: 14 plays, 67 yards, 7:42.**
- NYJ – Greg Zuerlein 53-yard field goal, 0:31. Bills 7–3. **Drive: 7 plays, 49 yards, 4:08.**

**Second quarter**

- BUF – Josh Allen 36-yard run (Tyler Bass kick), 6:30. Bills 14–3. **Drive: 9 plays, 93 yards, 4:12.**
- NYJ – Michael Carter 6-yard run (Greg Zuerlein kick), 0:32. Bills 14–10. **Drive: 13 plays, 75 yards, 5:58.**

**Third quarter**

- NYJ – James Robinson 7-yard pass from Zach Wilson (Greg Zuerlein kick), 4:03. Jets 17–14. **Drive: 4 plays, 19 yards, 1:27.**

**Fourth quarter**

- BUF – Tyler Bass 51-yard field goal, 13:33. Tied 17–17. **Drive: 12 plays, 42 yards, 5:30.**
- NYJ – Greg Zuerlein 28-yard field goal, 1:43. Jets 20–17. **Drive: 13 plays, 86 yards, 6:10.**

**Top passers**

- BUF – Josh Allen – 18/34, 205 yards, 2 INT
- NYJ – Zach Wilson – 18/25, 154 yards, TD

**Top rushers**

- BUF – Josh Allen – 9 rushes, 86 yards, 2 TD
- NYJ – Michael Carter – 12 rushes, 76 yards, TD

**Top receivers**

- BUF – Stefon Diggs – 5 receptions, 93 yards
- NYJ – Garrett Wilson – 8 receptions, 92 yards

The Jets defense intercepted Josh Allen twice, one by Sauce Gardner and the Jets went into their bye-week with a 6–3 record.

==== Week 11: at New England Patriots ====
Week 11: New York Jets at New England Patriots – Game summary

Quarter	1	2	3	4	Total
Jets	0	3	0	0	**3**
**Patriots**	0	3	0	7	**10**

at Gillette Stadium, Foxborough, Massachusetts

- Date: November 20
- Game time: 1:00 p.m. EST
- Game weather: Mostly sunny, 37 °F (3 °C)
- Game attendance: 65,878
- Referee: Carl Cheffers
- TV announcers (CBS): Kevin Harlan, Trent Green and Melanie Collins
- Recap, Game Book

Game information

**First quarter**

- No scoring plays.

**Second quarter**

- NE – Nick Folk 24-yard field goal, 14:57. Patriots 3–0. **Drive: 14 plays, 74 yards, 7:46.**
- NYJ – Greg Zuerlein 45-yard field goal, 9:38. Tied 3–3. **Drive: 9 plays, 46 yards, 5:19.**

**Third quarter**

- No scoring plays.

**Fourth quarter**

- NE – Marcus Jones 84-yard punt return (Nick Folk kick), 0:05. Patriots 10–3.

**Top passers**

- NYJ – Zach Wilson – 9/22, 77 yards
- NE – Mac Jones – 23/27, 246 yards

**Top rushers**

- NYJ – Zach Wilson – 3 rushes, 26 yards
- NE – Damien Harris – 8 rushes, 65 yards

**Top receivers**

- NYJ – Denzel Mims – 2 receptions, 35 yards
- NE – Rhamondre Stevenson – 6 receptions, 56 yards

There were 0 touchdowns for 59 minutes until Marcus Jones returned a punt 84-yards for a touchdown with only a few seconds left resulting in the Jets 14th consecutive loss to New England. Zach Wilson had a poor performance, completing only 9 out of 22 for 77 yards. After refusing to accept responsibility for the loss in a postgame press conference, Jets head coach Robert Saleh benched Wilson for Mike White for Week 12.

==== Week 12: vs. Chicago Bears ====
Week 12: Chicago Bears at New York Jets – Game summary

Quarter	1	2	3	4	Total
Bears	3	7	0	0	**10**
**Jets**	7	10	14	0	**31**

at MetLife Stadium, East Rutherford, New Jersey

- Date: November 27
- Game time: 1:00 p.m. EST
- Game weather: Rain, 52 °F (11 °C)
- Game attendance: 77,963
- Referee: John Hussey
- TV announcers (Fox): Joe Davis, Daryl Johnston and Pam Oliver
- Recap, Game Book

Game information

**First quarter**

- NYJ – Garrett Wilson 8-yard pass from Mike White (Greg Zuerlein kick), 10:12. Jets 7–0. **Drive: 9 plays, 75 yards, 4:48.**
- CHI – Cairo Santos 22-yard field goal, 5:59, Jets 7–3. **Drive: 9 plays, 71 yards, 4:13.**

**Second quarter**

- CHI – Byron Pringle 4-yard pass from Trevor Siemian (Cairo Santos kick), 14:20. Bears 10–7. **Drive: 9 plays, 71 yards, 4:51.**
- NYJ – Garrett Wilson 54-yard pass from Mike White (Greg Zuerlein kick), 4:57. Jets 14–10. **Drive: 4 plays, 78 yards, 2:14.**
- NYJ – Greg Zuerlein 57-yard field goal, 0:12. Jets 17–10. **Drive: 9 plays, 34 yards, 3:27.**

**Third quarter**

- NYJ – Elijah Moore 22-yard pass from Mike White (Greg Zuerlein kick), 6:35. Jets 24–10. **Drive: 6 plays, 53 yards, 3:24.**

**Fourth quarter**

- NYJ – Ty Johnson 32-yard run (Greg Zuerlein kick), 2:28. Jets 31–10. **Drive: 4 plays, 79 yards, 1:51.**

**Top passers**

- CHI – Trevor Siemian – 14/25, 179 yards, TD, INT
- NYJ – Mike White – 22/28, 315 yards, 3 TD

**Top rushers**

- CHI – David Montgomery – 14 rushes, 79 yards
- NYJ – Zonovan Knight – 14 rushes, 69 yards

**Top receivers**

- CHI – Chase Claypool – 2 receptions, 51 yards
- NYJ – Garrett Wilson – 5 receptions, 95 yards, 2 TD

Mike White threw 3 touchdowns as the Jets routed the Bears.

==== Week 13: at Minnesota Vikings ====
Week 13: New York Jets at Minnesota Vikings – Game summary

Quarter	1	2	3	4	Total
Jets	3	3	6	10	**22**
**Vikings**	3	17	0	7	**27**

at U.S. Bank Stadium, Minneapolis, Minnesota

- Date: December 4
- Game time: 1:00 p.m. EST/12:00 p.m. CST
- Game weather: None (indoor stadium)
- Game attendance: 66,973
- Referee: Clete Blakeman
- TV announcers (CBS): Ian Eagle, Charles Davis and Evan Washburn
- Recap, Game Book

Game information

**First quarter**

- MIN – Greg Joseph 51-yard field goal, 12:33. Vikings 3–0. **Drive: 4 plays, 1 yard, 0:52.**
- NYJ – Greg Zuerlein 48-yard field goal, 8:30. Tied 3–3. **Drive: 12 plays, 45 yards, 4:03.**

**Second quarter**

- MIN – Dalvin Cook 4-yard run (Greg Joseph kick), 13:02. Vikings 10–3. **Drive: 14 plays, 74 yards, 6:58.**
- MIN – Alexander Mattison 14-yard run (Greg Joseph kick), 3:35. Vikings 17–3. **Drive: 11 plays, 86 yards, 6:15.**
- MIN – Greg Joseph 41-yard field goal, 0:40. Vikings 20–3. **Drive: 7 plays, 20 yards, 1:18.**
- NYJ – Greg Zuerlein 60-yard field goal, 0:08. Vikings 20–6. **Drive: 6 plays, 33 yards, 0:32.**

**Third quarter**

- NYJ – Greg Zuerlein 36-yard field goal, 9:43. Vikings 20–9. **Drive: 8 plays, 43 yards, 3:13.**
- NYJ – Greg Zuerlein 30-yard field goal, 0:59. Vikings 20–12. **Drive: 12 plays, 62 yards, 6:17.**

**Fourth quarter**

- NYJ – Greg Zuerlein 26-yard field goal, 12:30. Vikings 20–15. **Drive: 5 plays, 63 yards, 2:16.**
- MIN – Justin Jefferson 10-yard pass from Kirk Cousins (Greg Joseph kick), 8:33. Vikings 27–15. **Drive: 7 plays, 75 yards, 3:57.**
- NYJ – Mike White 1-yard run (Greg Zuerlein kick), 6:45. Vikings 27–22. **Drive: 5 plays, 75 yards, 1:48.**

**Top passers**

- NYJ – Mike White – 31/57, 369 yards, 2 INT
- MIN – Kirk Cousins – 21/35, 173 yards, TD

**Top rushers**

- NYJ – Zonovan Knight – 15 rushes, 90 yards
- MIN – Dalvin Cook – 20 rushes, 86 yards, TD

**Top receivers**

- NYJ – Garrett Wilson – 8 receptions, 162 yards
- MIN – Justin Jefferson – 7 receptions, 45 yards, TD

Despite the late rally, the Jets could not comeback after a 20–6 deficit in the first half.

==== Week 14: at Buffalo Bills ====
Week 14: New York Jets at Buffalo Bills – Game summary

Quarter	1	2	3	4	Total
Jets	0	0	7	5	**12**
**Bills**	0	7	10	3	**20**

at Highmark Stadium, Orchard Park, New York

- Date: December 11
- Game time: 1:00 p.m. EST
- Game weather: Rain showers, 37 °F (3 °C)
- Game attendance: 70,603
- Referee: Alex Kemp
- TV announcers (CBS): Jim Nantz, Tony Romo and Tracy Wolfson
- Recap, Game Book

Game information

**First quarter**

- No scoring plays.

**Second quarter**

- BUF – Dawson Knox 24-yard pass from Josh Allen (Tyler Bass kick), 0:26. Bills 7–0. **Drive: 7 plays, 70 yards, 2:38.**

**Third quarter**

- NYJ – Zonovan Knight 13-yard run (Greg Zuerlein kick), 9:59. Tied 7–7. **Drive: 10 plays, 72 yards, 5:01.**
- BUF – Josh Allen 5-yard run (Tyler Bass kick), 7:20. Bills 14–7. **Drive: 6 plays, 75 yards, 2:39.**
- BUF – Tyler Bass 38-yard field goal, 2:07. Bills 17–7. **Drive: 5 plays, 24 yards, 2:23.**

**Fourth quarter**

- BUF – Tyler Bass 49-yard field goal, 12:23. Bills 20–7. **Drive: 5 plays, 21 yards, 2:37.**
- NYJ – Punt blocked by Jermaine Johnson II out of bounds in end zone for a safety, 7:30. Bills 20–9.
- NYJ – Greg Zuerlein 26-yard field goal, 1:18. Bills 20–12. **Drive: 9 plays, 55 yards, 1:55.**

**Top passers**

- NYJ – Mike White – 27/44, 268 yards
- BUF – Josh Allen – 16/27, 147 yards, TD

**Top rushers**

- NYJ – Zonovan Knight – 17 rushes, 71 yards, TD
- BUF – Josh Allen – 10 rushes, 47 yards, TD

**Top receivers**

- NYJ – Garrett Wilson – 6 receptions, 78 yards
- BUF – Dawson Knox – 4 receptions, 41 yards, TD

Mike White injured his ribs during the loss so Zach Wilson will start next week against the Detroit Lions.

==== Week 15: vs. Detroit Lions ====
Week 15: Detroit Lions at New York Jets – Game summary

Quarter	1	2	3	4	Total
**Lions**	7	3	3	7	**20**
Jets	0	10	0	7	**17**

at MetLife Stadium, East Rutherford, New Jersey

- Date: December 18
- Game time: 1:00 p.m. EST
- Game weather: Mostly sunny, 39 °F (4 °C)
- Game attendance: 75,076
- Referee: Craig Wrolstad
- TV announcers (CBS): Ian Eagle, Charles Davis and Evan Washburn
- Recap, Game Book

Game information

**First quarter**

- DET – Kalif Raymond 47-yard punt return (Michael Badgley kick), 6:00. Lions 7–0. **Drive: 3 plays, -1 yard, 0:55.**

**Second quarter**

- NYJ – C. J. Uzomah 40-yard pass from Zach Wilson (Greg Zuerlein kick), 14:06. Tied 7–7. **Drive: 3 plays, 78 yards, 1:09.**
- DET – Michael Badgley 31-yard field goal, 7:06. Lions 10–7. **Drive: 15 plays, 62 yards, 7:00.**
- NYJ – Greg Zuerlein 34-yard field goal, 0:00. Tied 10–10. **Drive: 5 plays, 65 yards, 0:25.**

**Third quarter**

- DET – Michael Badgley 34-yard field goal, 11:55. Lions 13–10. **Drive: 4 plays, -1 yard, 1:22.**

**Fourth quarter**

- NYJ – C. J. Uzomah 1-yard pass from Zach Wilson (Greg Zuerlein kick), 4:41. Jets 17–13. **Drive: 7 plays, 56 yards, 3:12.**
- DET – Brock Wright 51-yard pass from Jared Goff (Michael Badgley kick), 1:49. Lions 20–17. **Drive: 7 plays, 78 yards, 2:52.**

**Top passers**

- DET – Jared Goff – 23/38, 252 yards, TD
- NYJ – Zach Wilson – 18/35, 317 yards, 2 TD, INT

**Top rushers**

- DET – D'Andre Swift – 8 rushes, 52 yards
- NYJ – Zonovan Knight – 13 rushes, 23 yards

**Top receivers**

- DET – Amon-Ra St. Brown – 7 receptions, 76 yards
- NYJ – Garrett Wilson – 4 receptions, 98 yards

Greg Zuerlein missed a game-tying 58-yard field goal which would have sent the game into overtime.

==== Week 16: vs. Jacksonville Jaguars ====
Week 16: Jacksonville Jaguars at New York Jets – Game summary

Quarter	1	2	3	4	Total
**Jaguars**	3	10	3	3	**19**
Jets	3	0	0	0	**3**

at MetLife Stadium, East Rutherford, New Jersey

- Date: December 22
- Game time: 8:15 p.m. EST
- Game weather: Rain, 45 °F (7 °C)
- Game attendance: 70,043
- Referee: Brad Allen
- TV announcers (WNYW/Prime Video): Al Michaels, Kirk Herbstreit and Kaylee Hartung
- Recap, Game Book

Game information

**First quarter**

- NYJ – Greg Zuerlein 37-yard field goal, 11:37. Jets 3–0. **Drive: 4 plays, -3 yards, 1:59.**
- JAX – Riley Patterson 32-yard field goal, 7:15. Tied 3–3. **Drive: 10 plays, 61 yards, 4:22.**

**Second quarter**

- JAX – Trevor Lawrence 1-yard run (Riley Patterson kick), 11:26. Jaguars 10–3. **Drive: 16 plays, 96 yards, 8:15.**
- JAX – Riley Patterson 45-yard field goal, 2:55. Jaguars 13–3. **Drive: 8 plays, 61 yards, 4:44.**

**Third quarter**

- JAX – Riley Patterson 41-yard field goal, 7:06. Jaguars 16–3. **Drive: 12 plays, 49 yards, 6:24.**

**Fourth quarter**

- JAX – Riley Patterson 37-yard field goal, 3:46. Jaguars 19–3. **Drive: 4 plays, 5 yards, 0:24.**

**Top passers**

- JAX – Trevor Lawrence – 20/31, 229 yards
- NYJ – Zach Wilson – 9/18, 92 yards, INT

**Top rushers**

- JAX – Travis Etienne – 22 rushes, 83 yards
- NYJ – Chris Streveler – 9 rushes, 54 yards

**Top receivers**

- JAX – Evan Engram – 7 receptions, 113 yards
- NYJ – Tyler Conklin – 5 receptions, 44 yards

Zach Wilson struggled again after completing 9 out of 18 for 92 yards and an interception. After the first half, he was benched and replaced by Chris Streveler who sparked some hope but the Jaguars defense proved to be too much for Jets to overcome and they lost 3–19. The Jets fell to 7–8, dropping them below .500 for the first time since Week 3.

==== Week 17: at Seattle Seahawks ====
Week 17: New York Jets at Seattle Seahawks – Game summary

Quarter	1	2	3	4	Total
Jets	3	3	0	0	**6**
**Seahawks**	10	7	3	3	**23**

at Lumen Field, Seattle, Washington

- Date: January 1
- Game time: 4:05 p.m. EST/1:05 p.m. PST
- Game weather: Partly sunny, 46 °F (8 °C)
- Game attendance: 68,827
- Referee: Ronald Torbert
- TV announcers (Fox): Chris Myers, Robert Smith and Jen Hale
- Recap, Game Book

Game information

**First quarter**

- SEA – Colby Parkinson 12-yard pass from Geno Smith (Jason Myers kick), 13:25. Seahawks 7–0. **Drive: 3 plays, 73 yards, 1:35.**
- SEA – Jason Myers 25-yard field goal, 6:37. Seahawks 10–0. **Drive: 9 plays, 57 yards, 4:36.**
- NYJ – Greg Zuerlein 44-yard field goal, 2:19. Seahawks 10–3. **Drive: 9 plays, 49 yards, 4:18.**

**Second quarter**

- SEA – Tyler Mabry 7-yard pass from Geno Smith (Jason Myers kick), 14:15. Seahawks 17–3. **Drive: 7 plays, 75 yards, 3:04.**
- NYJ – Greg Zuerlein 44-yard field goal, 8:00. Seahawks 17–6. **Drive: 11 plays, 49 yards, 6:15.**

**Third quarter**

- SEA – Jason Myers 31-yard field goal, 6:03. Seahawks 20–6. **Drive: 13 plays, 40 yards, 5:57.**

**Fourth quarter**

- SEA – Jason Myers 31-yard field goal, 5:41. Seahawks 23–6. **Drive: 7 plays, 11 yards, 3:36.**

**Top passers**

- NYJ – Mike White – 23/46, 240 yards, 2 INT
- SEA – Geno Smith – 18/29, 183 yards, 2 TD

**Top rushers**

- NYJ – Ty Johnson – 8 rushes, 46 yards
- SEA – Kenneth Walker III – 23 rushes, 133 yards

**Top receivers**

- NYJ – Tyler Conklin – 6 receptions, 80 yards
- SEA – DeeJay Dallas – 3 receptions, 55 yards

Mike White was cleared to start again but struggled and was injured again. Geno Smith, who played for the Jets from 2013 to 2014, finished his revenge tour with a decisive victory and eliminated the Jets from playoff contention for the 12th straight year.

==== Week 18: at Miami Dolphins ====
Week 18: New York Jets at Miami Dolphins – Game summary

Quarter	1	2	3	4	Total
Jets	0	3	0	3	**6**
**Dolphins**	0	3	3	5	**11**

at Hard Rock Stadium, Miami Gardens, Florida

- Date: January 8
- Game time: 1:00 p.m. EST
- Game weather: 78 °F (26 °C)
- Game attendance: 66,429
- Referee: John Hussey
- TV announcers (Fox): Joe Davis, Daryl Johnston and Pam Oliver
- Recap, Game Book

Game information

**First quarter**

- No scoring plays

**Second quarter**

- MIA – Jason Sanders 37-yard field goal, 5:17. Dolphins 3–0. **Drive: 10 plays, 36 yards, 5:31.**
- NYJ – Greg Zuerlein 32-yard field goal, 1:35. Tied 3–3. **Drive: 11 plays, 61 yards, 3:42.**

**Third quarter**

- MIA – Jason Sanders 37-yard field goal, 5:18. Dolphins 6–3. **Drive: 15 plays, 72 yards, 8:12.**

**Fourth quarter**

- NYJ – Greg Zuerlein 35-yard field goal, 11:59. Tied 6–6. **Drive: 14 plays, 58 yards, 8:19.**
- MIA – Jason Sanders 50-yard field goal, 0:18. Dolphins 9–6. **Drive: 8 plays, 36 yards, 2:43.**
- MIA – Elijah Moore safety, 0:00. Dolphins 11–6.

**Top passers**

- NYJ – Joe Flacco – 18/33, 149 yards
- MIA – Skylar Thompson – 20/31, 152 yards

**Top rushers**

- NYJ – Zonovan Knight – 12 rushes, 22 yards
- MIA – Jeff Wilson – 16 rushes, 72 yards

**Top receivers**

- NYJ – Garrett Wilson – 9 receptions, 89 yards
- MIA – Mike Gesicki – 4 receptions, 46 yards

Neither team scored a touchdown, and the Jets had failed to score a touchdown in their last 3 games and had their 3rd straight double digit losing season, and 7th straight losing season.

=== Standings ===
==== Division ====
AFC East
	W	L	T	PCT	DIV	CONF	PF	PA	STK
^{(2)} Buffalo Bills	13	3	0	.813	4–2	9–2	455	286	W7
^{(7)} Miami Dolphins	9	8	0	.529	3–3	7–5	397	399	W1
New England Patriots	8	9	0	.471	3–3	6–6	364	347	L1
New York Jets	7	10	0	.412	2–4	5–7	296	316	L6

==== Conference ====
AFC
#	Team	Division	W	L	T	PCT	DIV	CONF	SOS	SOV	STK
**Division leaders**
1	Kansas City Chiefs	West	14	3	0	.824	6–0	9–3	.453	.422	W5
2	Buffalo Bills	East	13	3	0	.813	4–2	9–2	.489	.471	W7
3	Cincinnati Bengals	North	12	4	0	.750	3–3	8–3	.507	.490	W8
4	Jacksonville Jaguars	South	9	8	0	.529	4–2	8–4	.467	.438	W5
**Wild cards**
5 (Note: LA Chargers claimed the No. 5 seed over Baltimore based on conference record (7–5 vs. 6–6).)	Los Angeles Chargers	West	10	7	0	.588	2–4	7–5	.443	.341	L1
6	Baltimore Ravens	North	10	7	0	.588	3–3	6–6	.509	.456	L2
7 (Note: Miami finished ahead of Pittsburgh based on head-to-head victory, claiming the 7th and final playoff spot.)	Miami Dolphins	East	9	8	0	.529	3–3	7–5	.537	.457	W1
**Did not qualify for the postseason**
8	Pittsburgh Steelers	North	9	8	0	.529	3–3	5–7	.519	.451	W4
9	New England Patriots	East	8	9	0	.471	3–3	6–6	.502	.415	L1
10 (Note: NY Jets and Tennessee finished ahead of Cleveland based on conference record (5–7 vs. 4–8).) (Note: NY Jets finished ahead of Tennessee based on common record (3–3 vs. 2–4 against: Buffalo, Cincinnati, Denver, Green Bay, Jacksonville).)	New York Jets	East	7	10	0	.412	2–4	5–7	.538	.458	L6
11	Tennessee Titans	South	7	10	0	.412	3–3	5–7	.509	.336	L7
12	Cleveland Browns	North	7	10	0	.412	3–3	4–8	.524	.492	L1
13	Las Vegas Raiders	West	6	11	0	.353	3–3	5–7	.474	.397	L3
14	Denver Broncos	West	5	12	0	.294	1–5	3–9	.481	.465	W1
15	Indianapolis Colts	South	4	12	1	.265	1–4–1	4–7–1	.512	.500	L7
16	Houston Texans	South	3	13	1	.206	3–2–1	3–8–1	.481	.402	W1
**Tiebreakers** (Note: When breaking ties for three or more teams under the NFL's rules, they are first broken within divisions, then comparing only the highest ranked remaining team from each division.)
