= Tony Adams (safety) =

American football player (born 1999)

No. 29 – Tennessee Titans
- Position: Safety
- Roster status: Active

Personal information
- Born: January 24, 1999 (age 27); Belleville, Illinois, U.S.
- Listed height: 5 ft 11 in (1.80 m)
- Listed weight: 210 lb (95 kg)

Career information
- High school: St. Louis University (St. Louis, Missouri)
- College: Illinois (2017–2021)
- NFL draft: 2022: undrafted

Career history
- New York Jets (2022–2025); Tennessee Titans (2026–present)

Career NFL statistics as of 2025
- Total tackles: 232
- Sacks: 2
- Pass deflections: 16
- Interceptions: 4
- Stats at Pro Football Reference

Tony Adams (born January 24, 1999) is an American professional football safety for the Tennessee Titans of the National Football League (NFL). He played college football for the Illinois Fighting Illini and was signed by the New York Jets as an undrafted free agent in 2022.

== College career ==
Adams played at Illinois from 2017 to 2021. On October 26, 2019, against Purdue, he had a 13-yard interception return for a touchdown.

== Professional career ==
Pre-draft measurables
| Height | Weight | Arm length | Hand span | Wingspan | 40-yard dash | 10-yard split | 20-yard split | 20-yard shuttle | Three-cone drill | Vertical jump | Broad jump | Bench press |
|---|---|---|---|---|---|---|---|---|---|---|---|---|
| 5 ft 11 1/2 in (1.82 m) | 203 lb (92 kg) | 31 in (0.79 m) | 9 1/2 in (0.24 m) | 6 ft 3 3/8 in (1.91 m) | 4.47 s | 1.52 s | 2.56 s | 4.06 s | 6.98 s | 41.5 in (1.05 m) | 10 ft 10 in (3.30 m) | 14 reps |
All values from Pro Day

=== New York Jets ===
Adams signed with the New York Jets as an undrafted free agent on April 30, 2022, following the 2022 NFL draft. He made the Jets' 53 man roster following roster cuts. As a rookie, he appeared in 11 games and made one start, which came in Week 18 against the Miami Dolphins.

On October 15, 2023, in the Jets’ Week 6 game versus the undefeated Philadelphia Eagles, Adams intercepted Jalen Hurts with 2 minutes left in the game and returned it 45 yards to the Eagles’ 8 yard line. The Jets scored a touchdown one play later and won the game, 20–14. This was the first win by the Jets against the Eagles. In a November 19, 2023, game against the Buffalo Bills, Adams suffered a left hand injury in the first quarter and did not return to the game. In the 2023 season, he appeared in and started 15 games. He finished with 82 total tackles (54 solo), three interceptions, and five passes defended.

On April 4, 2025, Adams signed a restricted free agent tender with the Jets. He operated as a starting safety during the year, recording 49 tackles, one sack, and five pass deflections through 12 games (nine starts). After suffering a groin injury in Week 15 against the Jacksonville Jaguars, Adams was placed on season-ending injured reserve on December 18.

=== Tennessee Titans ===
On March 16, 2026, Adams signed a one-year, $2.14 million contract with the Tennessee Titans.

== NFL career statistics ==
Legend
| **Bold** | Career high |

=== Regular season ===
| Year | Team | Games | | Tackles | | | | | Interceptions | | | | | | Fumbles | | | | |
| Year | Team | GP | GS | Cmb | Solo | Ast | Sck | TFL | Int | Yds | Avg | Lng | TD | PD | FF | Fmb | FR | Yds | TD |
|---|---|---|---|---|---|---|---|---|---|---|---|---|---|---|---|---|---|---|---|
| 2022 | NYJ | 11 | 1 | 17 | 10 | 7 | 0.0 | 0 | 0 | 0 | 0.0 | 0 | 0 | 0 | 0 | 0 | 0 | 0 | 0 |
| 2023 | NYJ | 15 | 15 | 82 | **54** | 28 | 0.0 | **6** | **3** | **50** | **16.7** | **45** | 0 | 5 | 0 | 0 | 0 | 0 | 0 |
| 2024 | NYJ | 15 | 11 | **84** | 42 | **42** | **1.0** | 2 | 1 | 0 | 0.0 | 0 | 0 | **6** | 0 | 0 | 0 | 0 | 0 |
| 2025 | NYJ | 12 | 9 | 49 | 31 | 18 | **1.0** | 3 | 0 | 0 | 0.0 | 0 | 0 | 5 | 0 | 0 | 0 | 0 | 0 |
| Career | | 53 | 36 | 232 | 137 | 95 | 2.0 | 11 | 4 | 50 | 12.5 | 45 | 0 | 16 | 0 | 0 | 0 | 0 | 0 |
