= Frankie Luvu =

American Samoan football player (born 1996)

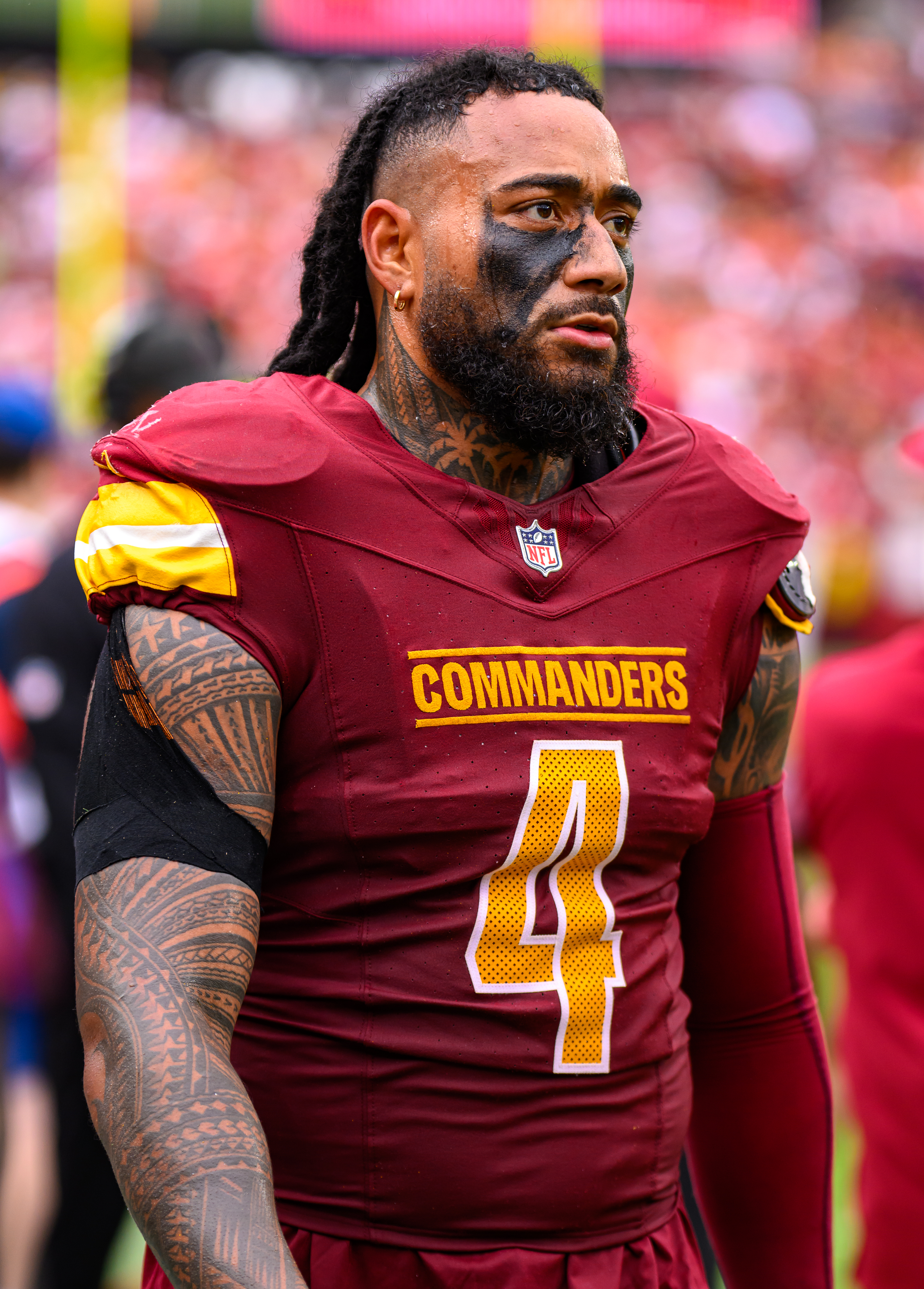
- Luvu with the Washington Commanders in 2025

No. 4 – Washington Commanders
- Position: Linebacker
- Roster status: Active

Personal information
- Born: September 19, 1996 (age 30); Tafuna, American Samoa
- Listed height: 6 ft 3 in (1.91 m)
- Listed weight: 235 lb (107 kg)

Career information
- High school: Tafuna (American Samoa)
- College: Washington State (2014–2017)
- NFL draft: 2018: undrafted

Career history
- New York Jets (2018–2020); Carolina Panthers (2021–2023); Washington Commanders (2024–present)

Awards and highlights
- Second-team All-Pro (2024)

Career NFL statistics as of Week 6, 2026
- Tackles: 549
- Sacks: 32
- Forced fumbles: 8
- Fumble recoveries: 6
- Interceptions: 2
- Pass deflections: 26
- Touchdowns: 1
- Stats at Pro Football Reference

Frankie Luvu (/ˈluːvuː/ LOO-voo; born September 19, 1996) is an American Samoan professional football linebacker for the Washington Commanders of the National Football League (NFL). He played college football for the Washington State Cougars before signing with the New York Jets as an undrafted free agent in 2018. Luvu has also played for the Carolina Panthers and earned second-team All-Pro honors with the Commanders in 2024.

== Early life ==
Luvu was born on September 19, 1996, in Tafuna, American Samoa. He moved to the contiguous United States in 2013 to play college football for the Cougars at Washington State University.

== Professional career ==
Pre-draft measurables
Height	Weight	Arm length	Hand span	Wingspan	40-yard dash	10-yard split	20-yard split	20-yard shuttle	Three-cone drill	Vertical jump	Broad jump	Bench press
6 ft 2 1/8 in (1.88 m)	235 lb (107 kg)	32 3/4 in (0.83 m)	9 3/4 in (0.25 m)	6 ft 5 7/8 in (1.98 m)	4.84 s	1.70 s	2.80 s	4.26 s	7.03 s	29.5 in (0.75 m)	9 ft 2 in (2.79 m)	21 reps
All values from Pro Day

=== New York Jets ===
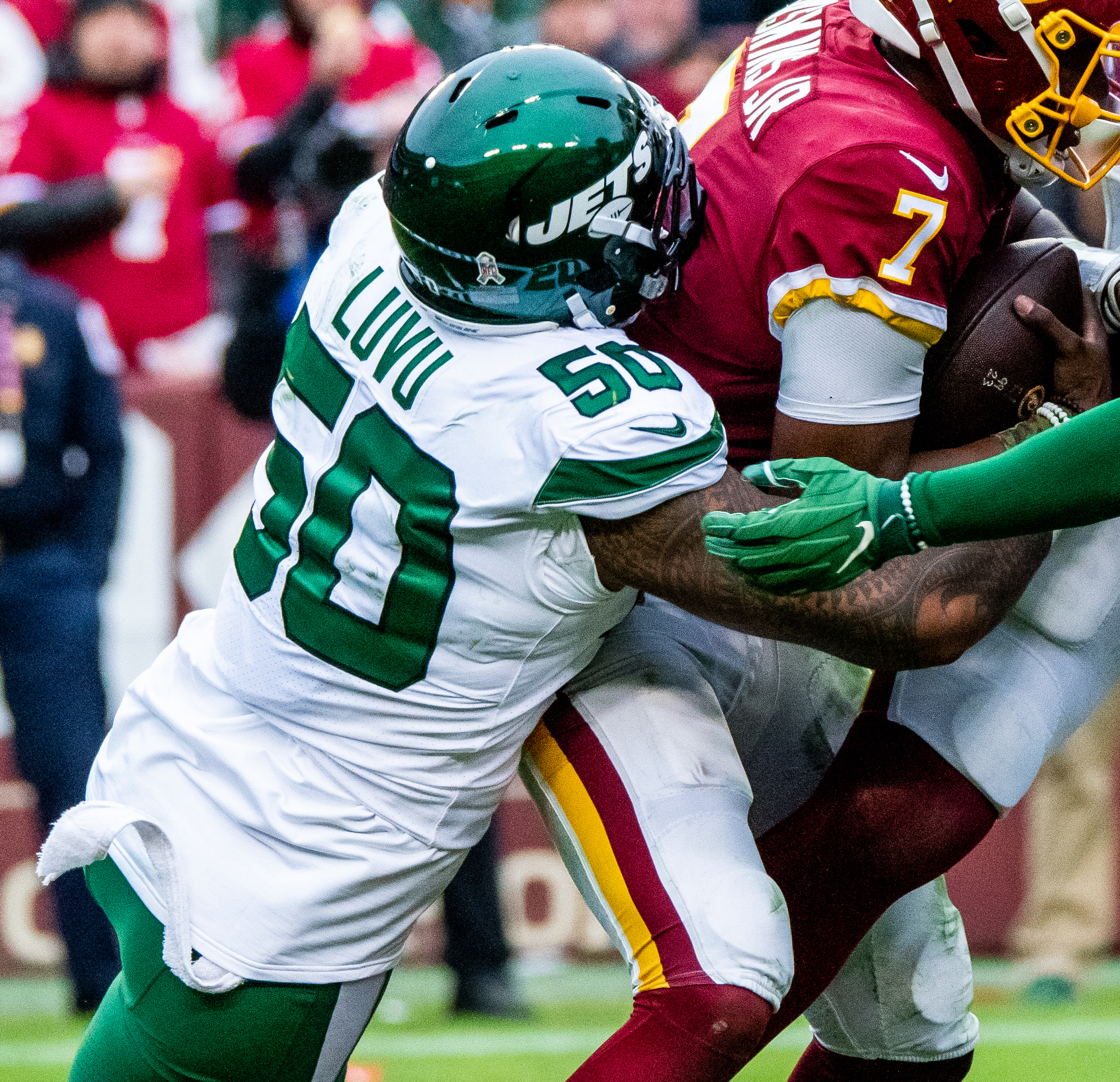
Luvu with the New York Jets making a tackle, 2019

==== 2018 ====
On May 6, 2018, the New York Jets signed Luvu to a three-year, $1.71 million contract as an undrafted free agent. Throughout training camp, Luvu competed for a roster spot as a backup linebacker against Lorenzo Mauldin, Dylan Donahue, Josh Martin, and David Bass. On September 1, 2018, the New York Jets waived Luvu as a part of their final roster cuts. After clearing waivers, the Jets signed Luvu to their practice squad the following day.

On September 8, 2018, the New York Jets promoted him to the active roster after Josh Martin would be inactive for the season-opener due lingering symptoms from a concussion he received during the preseason. Head coach Todd Bowles named Luvu the primary backup outside linebacker behind Brandon Copeland and Jordan Jenkins.

On September 10, 2018, Luvu made his regular season debut and recorded three solo tackles, two tackles for-a-loss, and deflected a pass in a 48–17 victory at the Detroit Lions. In Week 4, Luvu was inactive as a healthy scratch after Josh Martin returned for the Jets' 12–31 loss at the Jacksonville Jaguars. Luvu returned to action the following week after Martin sustained another concussion in Week 4. On October 28, 2018, he made one solo tackles, one tackle for-a-loss, and earned the first sack of his career on quarterback Mitchell Trubisky in a 10–24 loss at the Chicago Bears. He was inactive during a Week 9 loss at the Miami Dolphins due to a neck injury. On December 30, 2018, Luvu earned his first career start at outside linebackers during a 3–31 loss at the New England Patriots. He finished his rookie season with 22 combined tackles (17 solo), five tackles for-a-loss, three sacks, and a pass deflection in 14 games and one start. After the game, the Jets announced their decision to fire head coach Todd Bowles and his staff, including defensive coordinator Kacy Rodgers. The New York Jets finished last in the AFC East and did not qualify for the playoffs after finishing the 2018 NFL season with a 4–12 record.

==== 2019 ====
On January 11, 2019, the New York Jets announced their decision to hire Adam Gase as their new head coach after he was fired by the Miami Dolphins two weeks prior. In training camp, Luvu competed against Brandon Copeland, Jordan Jenkins, Jachai Polite, Harvey Langi, and Tarell Basham for a role as a starting outside linebackers. Defensive coordinator Gregg Williams named Luvu a backup outside linebacker, behind starters Jordan Jenkins and Harvey Langi, to kickoff the regular season.

On October 14, 2019, Luvu was waived by the Jets and re-signed to the practice squad. He was promoted to the active roster on November 1, 2019. On November 17, 2019, Luvu made a season-high three combined tackles (two solo) a tackle for-a-loss, and a sack during a 34–17 win at Washington. He finished the 2019 NFL season with 12 combined tackles (10 solo), a tackle for-a-loss, and a sack in 13 games. The New York Jets finished third in the AFC East with a 7–9 record and did not qualify for the playoffs.

==== 2020 ====
On April 23, 2020, the New York Jets signed Luvu to a one-year, $675,000 contract. Throughout training camp, Luvu competed against Harvey Langi, Tarrell Basham, Jabari Zuniga, and Bryce Huff to be a starting outside linebacker. Defensive coordinator Gregg Williams named Luvu a backup outside linebacker to start the season, behind Jordan Jenkins and Tarell Basham.

On October 20, 2020, Luvu was placed on injured reserve due to with a groin injury and was inactive for three games (Weeks 7–9). He was activated on November 21, 2020. On November 22, 2020, Luvu earned his first start of the season and recorded two solo tackles, a tackle for-a-loss, and made the first safety of his career on a 28-yard tackle on punter Ty Long during a 28–34 loss at the Los Angeles Chargers. In Week 17, he collected a season-high five solo tackles, one tackle for-a-loss, a pass deflection, and a sack during a 14–28 loss at the New England Patriots. He finished the 2020 NFL season with a total of 25 combined tackles (17 solo), two sacks, three tackles for-a-loss, a pass deflection, one forced fumble, and a safety in 13 games and three starts. The New York Jets finished fourth in the AFC East with a 2–14 record.

=== Carolina Panthers ===
==== 2021 ====
On March 23, 2021, the Carolina Panthers signed Luvu to a one-year, $1.10 million contract that includes a signing bonus of $180,000.

During training camp, Luvu competed for a roster spot as a backup linebacker against Morgan Fox, Marquis Haynes, and Yetur Gross-Matos. Head coach Matt Rhule named Luvu the primary backup outside linebacker behind starters Hassan Reddick and Shaq Thompson after performing well throughout the preseason.

In Week 14, Luvu was inactive as an healthy scratch. On January 2, 2022, Luvu recorded a season-high nine combined tackles (six solo) and three tackles for-a-loss during an 10–18 loss at the New Orleans Saints. He finished the 2021 NFL season with a total of 43 combined tackles (26 solo), 1.5 sacks, one forced fumble, three fumble recoveries and a blocked punt in 16 games and four starts. The Carolina Panthers finished last in the NFC South with a 5–12 record and did not qualify for the playoffs.

==== 2022 ====
On February 17, 2022, the Carolina Panthers signed Luvu to a two-year, $9.00 million contract extension that includes $4.50 million guaranteed upon signing and a signing bonus of $3.00 million.

During training camp, Luvu competed against Cory Littleton to be the starting strongside linebacker after the role was left vacant after Hassan Reddick departed in free agency. Head coach Matt Rhule named Luvu the starting strongside linebacker to begin the regular season, alongside weakside linebacker Shaq Thompson and middle linebacker Damien Wilson.

In Week 2, Luvu made a season-high ten solo tackles, a season-high four tackles for-a-loss, and a pass deflection during a 16–19 loss at the New York Giants. On October 2, 2022, Luvu recorded 11 combined tackles (six solo), a tackle for-a-loss, deflected a pass, and returned the first interception of his career for his first career touchdown during a 16–26 loss at the Arizona Cardinals. Luvu sustained a shoulder injury and was inactive for two games (Weeks 5–6). On October 10, 2022, the Carolina Panthers fired head coach Matt Rhule after starting the season with a 1–4 record. Defensive passing game coordinator Steve Wilks served as the interim head coach for the remainder of the season. Luvu intercepted a pass by Cardinals' quarterback Kyler Murray, that was intended for wide receiver Marquise Brown, and returned it for a 33-yard touchdown in the second quarter. In Week 10, he collected 12 combined tackles (8 solo), made two tackles for-a-loss, and recorded a season-high two sacks on quarterback Marcus Mariota during a 15–25 victory against the Atlanta Falcons. He finished the season with 111 combined tackles (76 solo), 19 tackles for-a-loss, seven sacks, four pass deflections, a forced fumble, one interception, and a touchdown in 15 games and 14 starts. The Carolina Panthers finished second in the NFC South with a 7–10 record.

==== 2023 ====
On January 26, 2023, the Carolina Panthers hired former Indianapolis Colts' head coach Frank Reich as their new head coach. Luvu entered training camp slated to be a starting inside linebacker after new Defensive Coordinator Ejiro Evero opted to transition from a base 4–3 defense to a base 3–4. Head coach Frank Reich officially named Luvu and Shaq Thompson the starting inside linebacker duo to start the season, alongside outside linebackers Brian Burns and Justin Houston.

In Week 2, he recorded nine combined tackles (four solo), three tackles for-a-loss, and had a season-high two sacks on Derek Carr in a 17–20 loss to the New Orleans Saints. On October 22, 2023, Luvu collected a season-high 12 combined tackles (7 solo), two tackles for-a-loss, two pass deflections, and one sack in the Panthers' 15–13 victory against the Houston Texans. He was named the NFC Defensive Player of the Week in Week 12 for his performance against Houston. On November 27, 2023, the Carolina Panthers announced their decision to fire head coach Frank Reich after a 1–10 record. Special teams coordinater Chris Tabor was tasked to replace Reich as the interim head coach for the rest of the season. He finished the season with a career-high 125 combined tackles (66 solo), ten tackles for-a-loss, five pass deflections, 5.5 sacks, and two forced fumbles while starting in all 17 games to complete the first time he appeared in all regular season games. The Carolina Panthers ended the 2023 NFL season with a 2–14 record to finish fourth in their division.

=== Washington Commanders ===
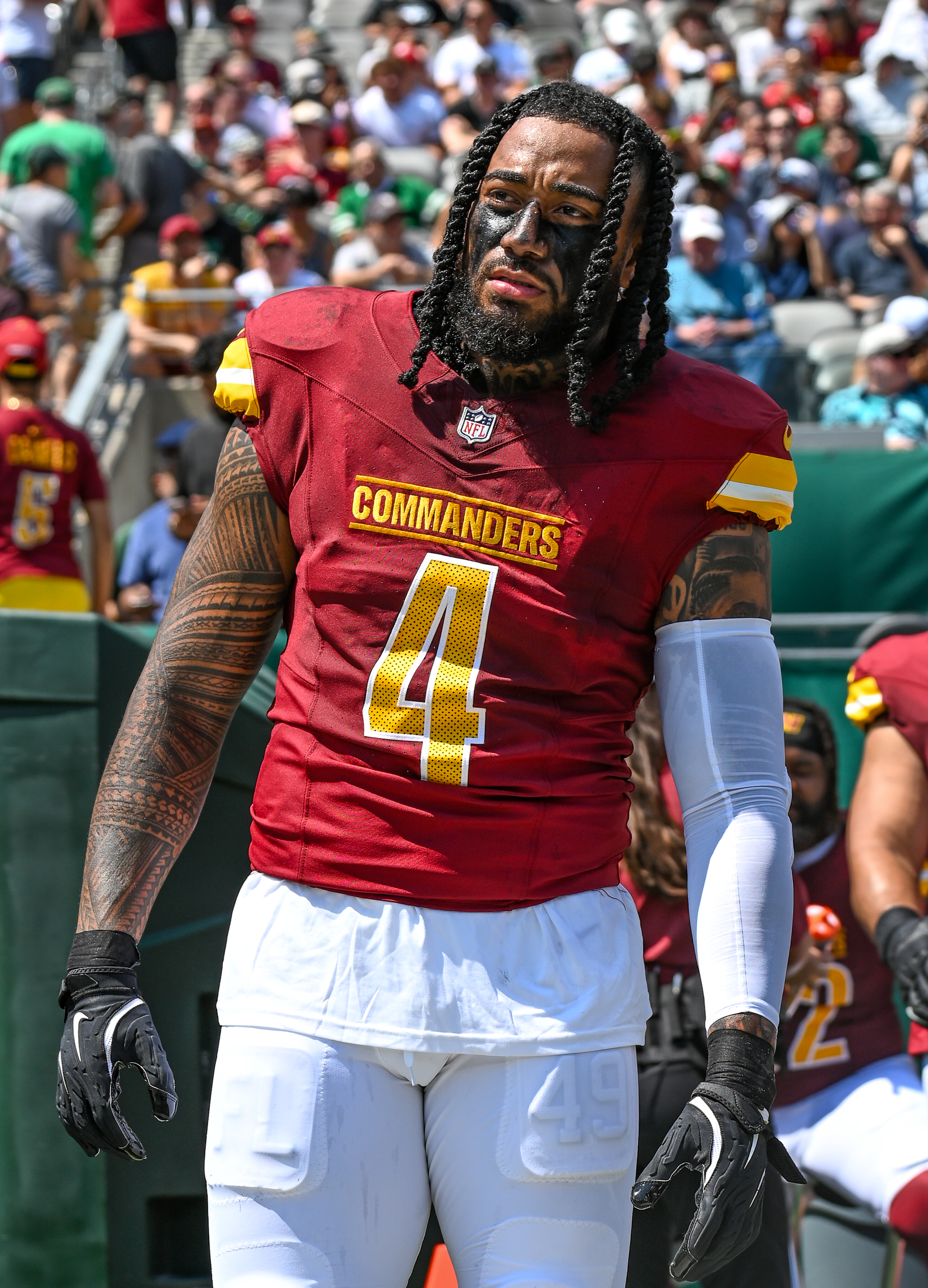
Luvu with the Washington Commanders in 2024

==== 2024 ====
On March 11, 2024, Luvu signed a three-year $31 million contract with the Washington Commanders. He earned second-team All-Pro honors in his first season with Washington after recording 99 tackles, 8 sacks, 2 fumble recoveries, a forced fumble, 7 pass breakups, and an interception.

==== 2025 ====
Following Week 9 of the 2025 season, the league suspended Luvu for one game for repeated hip-drop infractions on November 3, 2025. The next day, the NFL announced the punishment was reduced to a $100,000 fine in place of the suspension after Luvu appealed.

== NFL career statistics ==
Legend
**Bold**	Career high

=== Regular season ===
Year	Team	Games		Tackles					Interceptions				Fumbles			
Year	Team	GP	GS	Cmb	Solo	Ast	Sck	TFL	Int	Yds	TD	PD	FF	FR	Yds	TD
2018	NYJ	14	1	22	17	5	3.0	5	0	0	0	1	0	0	0	0
2019	NYJ	13	0	12	10	2	1.0	1	0	0	0	0	0	0	0	0
2020	NYJ	13	3	25	17	8	2.0	3	0	0	0	1	1	0	0	0
2021	CAR	16	4	43	26	17	1.5	8	0	0	0	1	1	**3**	**35**	0
2022	CAR	15	14	111	**76**	35	7.0	**19**	**1**	**33**	**1**	4	1	0	0	0
2023	CAR	17	17	**125**	66	**59**	5.5	10	0	0	0	5	**2**	0	0	0
2024	WAS	17	17	99	54	45	**8.0**	12	**1**	0	0	**7**	1	2	5	0
2025	WAS	17	17	86	42	44	3.0	5	0	0	0	6	**2**	0	0	0
2026	WAS	4	4	26	10	16	1.0	2	0	0	0	1	0	1	0	0
Career		126	77	549	318	231	32.0	65	2	33	1	26	8	6	40	0

=== Postseason ===
Year	Team	Games		Tackles					Interceptions				Fumbles			
Year	Team	GP	GS	Cmb	Solo	Ast	Sck	TFL	Int	Yds	TD	PD	FF	FR	Yds	TD
2024	WAS	3	3	17	10	7	1.0	2	–	–	–	0	0	1	0	0
Career		3	3	17	10	7	1.0	2	0	0	0	0	0	1	0	0

== Personal life ==
Of American Samoan descent, Luvu is the youngest of eight children born to Veresa, former Fiji national rugby union team player, and Faaloiloia Luvu. He became a naturalized U.S. citizen in August 2023.
