= Neville Hewitt =

Neville Hewitt may refer to:

- Nev Hewitt (1920–2016), Member of the Queensland Legislative Assembly
- Neville Hewitt (American football) (born 1993), American football inside linebacker
