= Marcus Maye =

American football player (born 1993)

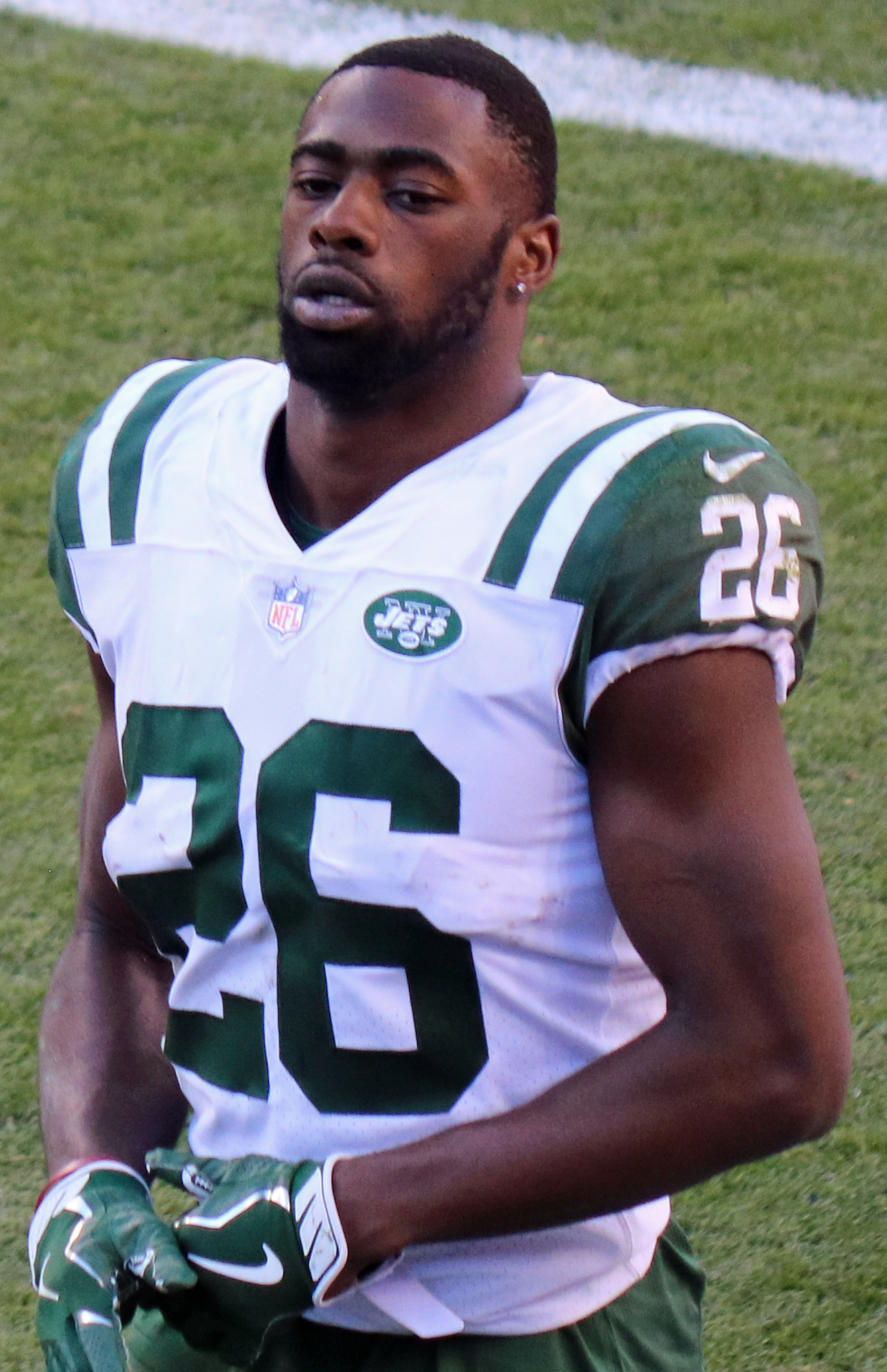
- Maye with the New York Jets in 2017

Profile
- Position: Safety

Personal information
- Born: March 9, 1993 (age 33); Melbourne, Florida, U.S.
- Listed height: 6 ft 0 in (1.83 m)
- Listed weight: 207 lb (94 kg)

Career information
- High school: Holy Trinity Episcopal Academy (Melbourne, Florida)
- College: Florida (2012–2016)
- NFL draft: 2017: 2nd round, 39th overall pick

Career history
- New York Jets (2017–2021); New Orleans Saints (2022–2023); Miami Dolphins (2024); Los Angeles Chargers (2024–2025)

Awards and highlights
- Second-team All-SEC (2016)

Career NFL statistics as of 2025
- Total tackles: 456
- Sacks: 4.5
- Forced fumbles: 5
- Fumble recoveries: 1
- Pass deflections: 31
- Interceptions: 9
- Stats at Pro Football Reference

Marcus Dajon Maye (born March 9, 1993) is an American professional football safety. He has previously played in the NFL for the New York Jets, New Orleans Saints, and Miami Dolphins. He played college football for the Florida Gators. Maye is a native of Melbourne, Florida. Maye has been praised for his versatility and was selected first-team All-American by USA Today.

== Early life ==
Maye attended and played high school football at Holy Trinity Episcopal Academy.

== College career ==
Maye played college football at the University of Florida. He redshirted in 2012. As a freshman in 2013, he played in 8 games, making 16 tackles and an interception. As a sophomore in 2014, he played 11 games with 62 tackles, 5 passes defended, 2 forced fumbles, and an interception. As a junior in 2015, Maye played 12 games with 77 tackles, 4 passes defended, 2 forced fumbles, and 2 interceptions. As a senior in 2016, he played 9 games with 50 tackles, a sack, and an interception.

=== Collegiate statistics ===
Marcus Maye						Tackles					Interceptions					Fumbles	
Season	Team	Conf	Class	Pos	GP	Solo	Ast	Comb	TfL	Sck	Int	Yds	Avg	TD	PD	FR	FF
2013	Florida	SEC	FR	DB	8	11	5	16	1.0	0.0	1	30	30.0	0	0	0	0
2014	Florida	SEC	SO	DB	11	38	24	62	3.0	0.0	1	1	1.0	0	5	0	2
2015	Florida	SEC	JR	DB	12	43	34	77	1.0	0.0	2	0	0.0	0	6	2	4
2016	Florida	SEC	SR	DB	9	29	21	50	1.5	1.0	1	6	6.0	0	5	0	0
Career					40	121	84	205	6.5	1.0	5	37	7.4	0	16	2	6

== Professional career ==
=== Pre-draft ===
Maye received an invitation to the NFL Combine, but opted to not perform drills and wait until his pro day. At Florida's Pro Day, he chose to perform all of the combine drills except the bench press and completed positional drills for team representatives and scouts. NFL draft experts and analysts projected him to be a second round draft pick. He was ranked as the fourth best free safety in the draft by NFLDraftScout.com, was ranked the seventh best safety by ESPN, and the eighth best safety by Sports Illustrated.

External videos
- Marcus Maye's NFL combine workout

Pre-draft measurables
Height	Weight	Arm length	Hand span	Wingspan	40-yard dash	10-yard split	20-yard split	20-yard shuttle	Three-cone drill	Vertical jump	Broad jump
5 ft 11 3/4 in (1.82 m)	210 lb (95 kg)	32 1/2 in (0.83 m)	9 1/8 in (0.23 m)	6 ft 5 1/4 in (1.96 m)	4.47 s	1.57 s	2.71 s	4.18 s	7.07 s	33.5 in (0.85 m)	9 ft 10 in (3.00 m)
All values from Florida's Pro Day/Measurables from NFL Combine

=== New York Jets ===
External videos
- Jets select Marcus Maye 39th overall
- Marcus Maye's NFL Draft Profile

The New York Jets selected Maye in the second round (39th overall) of the 2017 NFL draft. He was the second safety selected by the Jets after they selected LSU's Jamal Adams sixth overall.

==== 2017 ====
On May 23, 2017, the Jets signed Maye to a four-year, $6.55 million contract with $3.66 million guaranteed and a signing bonus of $2.90 million.

He entered training camp competing against Jamal Adams and Calvin Pryor to be one of the starting safeties. Head coach Todd Bowles named Maye the starting free safety to begin the regular season, alongside strong safety Jamal Adams.

He made his professional regular season debut and first career start in the New York Jets season-opener at the Buffalo Bills and recorded seven combined tackles during a 21–12 loss. In Week 5, Maye recorded four combined tackles, deflected a pass, and made his first career interception off a pass by quarterback Kevin Hogan in the Jets' 17–14 victory at the Cleveland Browns. On October 22, 2017, he collected a season-high seven combined tackles, broke up a pass, and intercepted a pass attempt by Jay Cutler in the Jets' 31–28 loss at the Miami Dolphins. In Week 15, Maye made a season-high tying seven combined tackles during a 31–19 loss at the New Orleans Saints. Maye finished his rookie season in 2017 with 79 combined tackles (57 solo), two pass deflections, and two interceptions in 16 starts.

==== 2018 ====
Maye missed the first three games of 2018 due to a foot injury, but returned in Week 4 as the Jets starting free safety. During Week 5 against the Denver Broncos, Maye intercepted Case Keenum and returned it 104 yards but was a yard shy of scoring a touchdown. Time expired anyhow and the Jets won 34–16. The interception set the NFL record for longest interception return without scoring a touchdown. He then suffered a broken thumb the following week against the Indianapolis Colts and missed the next game. He returned in Week 8, playing in the next three games before suffering a shoulder injury in Week 10 against the Bills. He was placed on injured reserve on December 1, 2018, ending an injury-plagued season for Maye.

==== 2019 ====
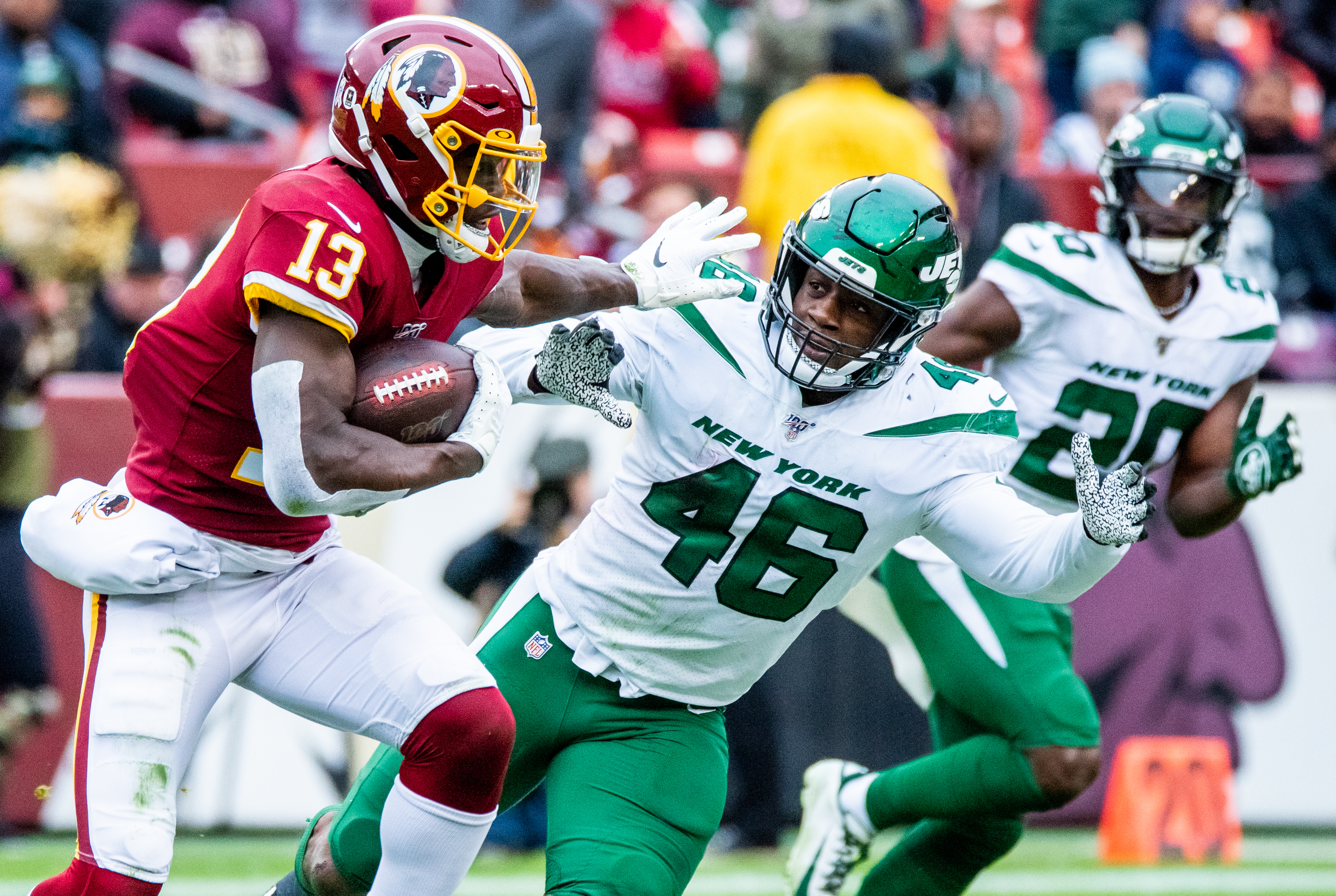
Maye in a game against the Washington Redskins

Maye changed his number from 26 to 20 to accommodate the signing of Le'Veon Bell. In week 16 against the Pittsburgh Steelers, Maye recorded an interception off a pass thrown by Devlin Hodges late in the fourth quarter to seal a 16–10 Jets' win. This was Maye's first interception of the season. In the 2019 season, Maye started in all 16 games. He finished with 65 total tackles, one interception, and seven passes defended.

==== 2020 ====
During Week 1 against the Bills, Maye recorded a team high 10 tackles, two sacks, two quarterback hits, two tackles for loss, two passes defensed, and one forced fumble as the Jets lost 17–27. In Week 6 against the Dolphins, Maye recorded his first interception of the season off a pass thrown by Ryan Fitzpatrick by placing the ball between his hand and his backside during the 24–0 loss. In Week 11 against the Los Angeles Chargers, Maye forced a fumble on wide receiver Keenan Allen at the goal line which was recovered by teammate Ashtyn Davis during the 34–28 loss. In the 2020 season, he started in all 16 games. He finished with two sacks, 88 total tackles, two interceptions, 11 passes defended, and two forced fumbles.

==== 2021 ====
The Jets placed the franchise tag on Maye on March 9, 2021. He signed the one-year tender on March 22, 2021. On November 9, 2021, Maye was placed on injured reserve after suffering a torn Achilles in Week 9.

=== New Orleans Saints ===
On March 16, 2022, the New Orleans Saints signed Maye to a three-year, $28.5 million contract. In the 2022 season, he appeared in and started in ten games. He finished with 60 total tackles, two passes defended, and one forced fumble.

On September 20, 2023, Maye was suspended for three games in response to a violation of the NFL's substance abuse policy. He was placed on injured reserve on December 6. In the 2023 season, Maye appeared in and started seven games. He had one sack, 37 total tackles (27 solo), two interceptions, and two passes defended.

On February 29, 2024, Maye was released by the Saints.

=== Miami Dolphins ===
On June 13, 2024, Maye signed with the Miami Dolphins. He played in 11 games with three starts before being released on November 26.

=== Los Angeles Chargers ===
On November 27, 2024, Maye was claimed off waivers by the Los Angeles Chargers. He made four appearances (one start) for Los Angeles, recording one interception, two pass deflections, and 12 combined tackles.

On December 16, 2025, the Chargers re-signed Maye to their practice squad. He was promoted to the active roster on January 3, 2026. Maye was released on January 5, and re-signed to the practice squad.

== NFL career statistics ==
Legend
	Led the league
**Bold**	Career high

=== Regular season ===
Year	Team	Games		Tackles				Interceptions						Fumbles			
Year	Team	GP	GS	Cmb	Solo	Ast	Sck	PD	Int	Yds	Avg	Lng	TD	FF	FR	Yds	TD
2017	NYJ	**16**	**16**	79	**57**	22	0.0	2	**2**	44	22.0	32	0	1	0	0	0
2018	NYJ	6	6	34	30	4	0.5	2	1	**104**	**104.0**	**104**	0	1	0	0	0
2019	NYJ	**16**	**16**	65	50	15	0.0	7	1	0	0.0	0	0	0	0	0	0
2020	NYJ	**16**	**16**	**88**	52	**36**	**2.0**	**11**	**2**	0	0.0	0	0	**2**	**1**	0	0
2021	NYJ	6	6	46	30	16	1.0	2	0	0	0.0	0	0	0	0	0	0
2022	NO	10	10	60	42	18	0.0	2	0	0	0.0	0	0	1	0	0	0
2023	NO	7	7	37	27	10	1.0	2	**2**	5	2.5	5	0	0	0	0	0
Career		77	77	409	288	121	4.5	28	8	153	19.1	104	0	5	1	0	0

== Legal issues ==
On October 4, 2021, it was announced that Maye was facing charges in a DUI arrest and car crash that occurred back in February 2021.

On September 1, 2022, Maye was arrested for aggravated assault with a firearm and was booked into Jefferson Parish Correctional Center in Louisiana. He was released from jail after posting a $30,000 bond. The incident occurred due to a road rage incident. Cops say Maye was driving a black SUV when he was accused of pointing a gun at a car full of "several juvenile females". It was later discovered that the accusers were lying when requestioned by authorities and no charges were ever pressed against Maye.
