= Holy Trinity Episcopal Academy =

Private school in Melbourne, Florida, United States

Coordinates: 28.0810°N 80.6224°W

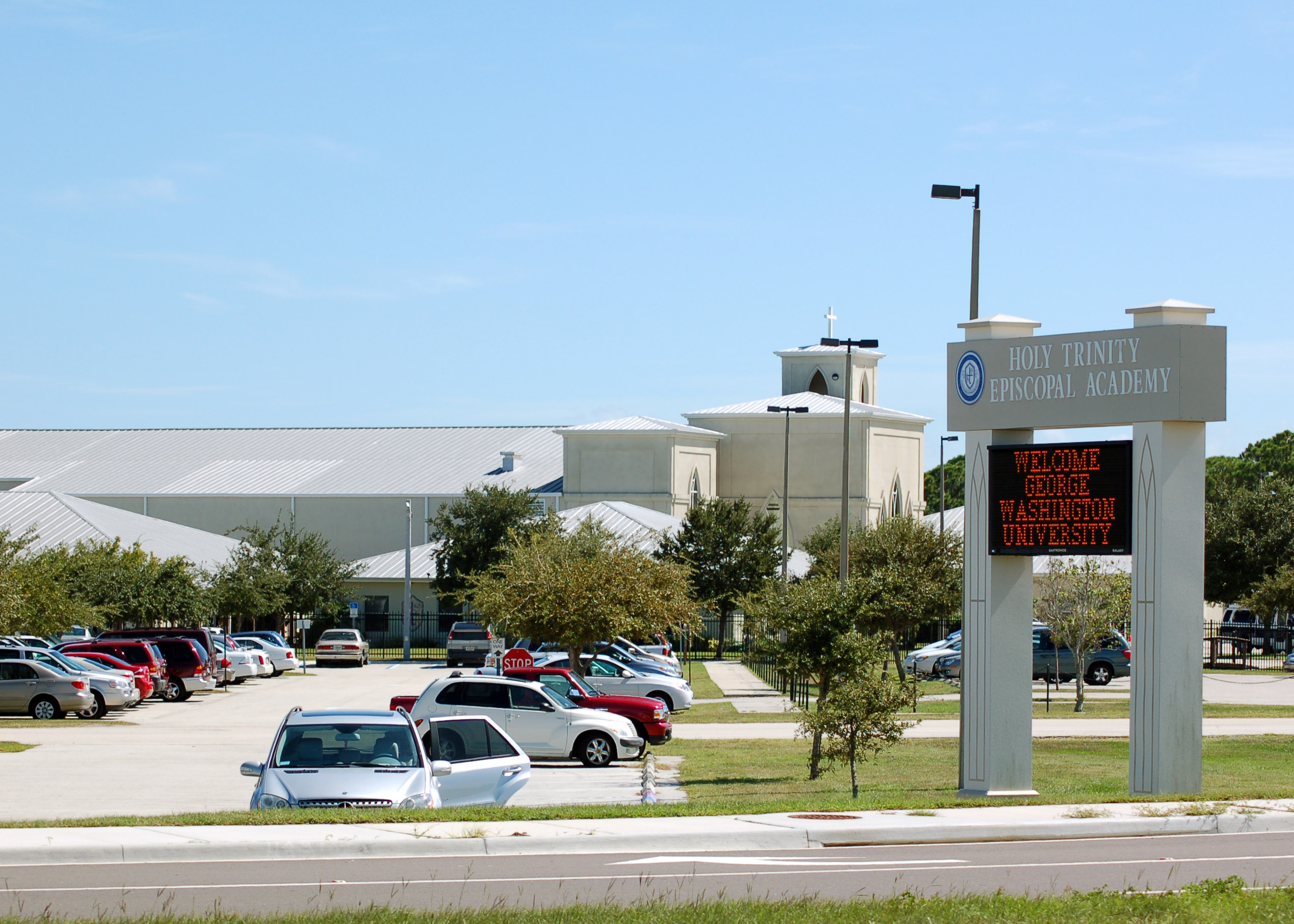

Location
- Upper School: 5625 Holy Trinity Drive, Melbourne, FL 32940; Lower School: 1720 Peachtree St., Melbourne, FL 32901; Melbourne, Brevard, Florida; United States

Information
- Type: Private School
- Motto: "Start Here. Go Anywhere."
- Established: Lower School: 1957 Upper School: 2001
- Headmaster: Mr. Jon Kellam
- Enrollment: 976
- Color: Blue And Gold
- Mascot: Tigers
- Website: htacademy.org

Holy Trinity Episcopal Academy in Melbourne, Florida, is an Episcopal coeducational college-preparatory school for grades preschool – 12th. It was founded in 1957. The school operates under the guidance of Holy Trinity Episcopal Church, the Episcopal Diocese of Central Florida and the National Association of Independent Schools.

== Structure ==
The academy is divided into the Lower School (3-year-old preschool through grade 6) and Upper School (grades 7–12). It has an academic program and an athletic program.

== History ==
Holy Trinity Episcopal Academy was established in 1957 as Holy Trinity Parish Day School. Its founding rector was The Reverend Alex Boyer. In 2000, the school expanded, splitting into a Lower School in the original location and an Upper School (high school) located at a new campus in Pineda, which graduated its first class of seniors in 2003. In 1957 when it was first created, they walked students to McDonald's for lunch. The first head of school was Catherine Ford.

The academy had eight National Merit Scholarship finalists in 2010, highest in the county and double the next closest school.

== Notable alumni ==
- Seth Coleman, 2019, college football defensive end
- Jashaun Corbin, 2018, non-graduate, running back in the National Football League
- Stefanie Scott, 2014, non-graduate, actress
- Marcus Maye, 2012, safety in the National Football League
- Kate Upton, 2010, non-graduate, professional model
- Vicky Hurst, 2008, professional golfer

== See also ==
- Holy Trinity Episcopal Church Parish (Melbourne, Florida)
