= Holy Trinity Episcopal Church (Melbourne, Florida) =

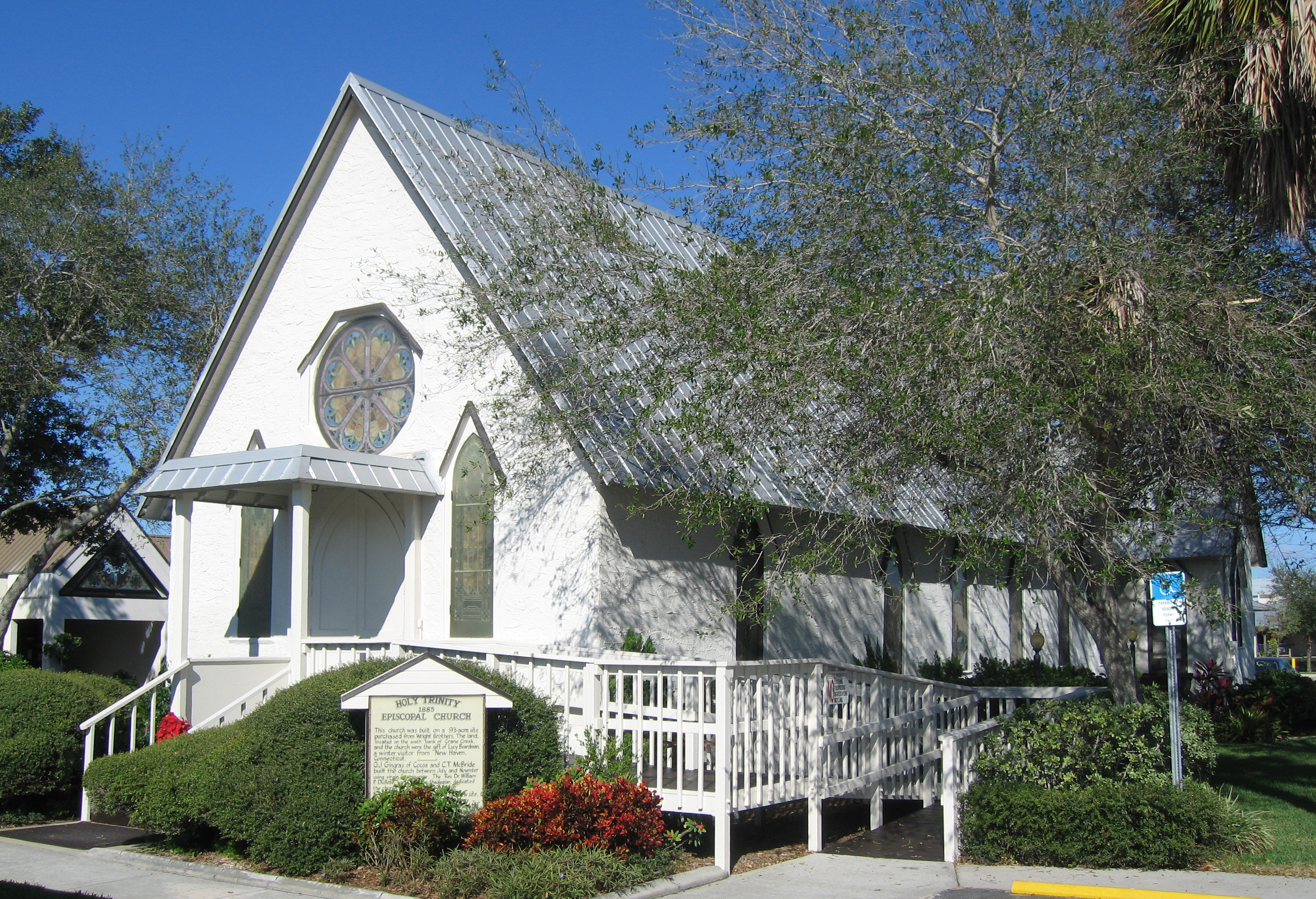

Religion
- Affiliation: Episcopal

Location
- Location: 50 West Strawbridge Avenue; Melbourne, Florida
- Interactive map of Holy Trinity Episcopal Church
- Coordinates: 28.080206°N 80.623166°W

Architecture
- Architects: Built by George J. Gingras of Cocoa & C. T. McBride
- Completed: 1886
- Materials: Wood

Website
- Website

The Holy Trinity Episcopal Church is a historic church currently located at 50 West Strawbridge Avenue, Melbourne, Florida, United States. It is the oldest established church of any denomination in the city.

== History ==
The church was built between July and November 1886 and the Reverend Dr. William Porcher DuBose presided over the first service on December 27, 1886. The church was originally located on the south bank of Crane Creek in Melbourne on land purchased from the Wright Brothers through a gift from Lucy Boardman. Members on the north side of Crane Creek traveled by boat and later by footbridge to attend services. For easier access, the congregation moved the church in 1897 to the north side of the creek. The new site was located on the Corner of Fee Avenue and U.S. 1 in Melbourne on land donated by William and Nora Stanford Wells. Jessie S. Goode provided the belfry and bell in 1923 as a gift to the church. The congregation renovated the church in 1927 and moved it again in 1963 to its current location.

== The Congregation ==
The church congregation initially organized in June 1884 at the home of Richard W. Goode. Other founding members included the Campbell, Ellis, Ely, Grubb and Miller families—many of the prominent people of the area at the time. The congregation officially became a parish in 1949 and purchased land on Strawbridge Avenue for the construction of a new sanctuary, church offices and school classrooms. In 1958, the parish expanded the school, which later became Holy Trinity Episcopal Academy.

== See also ==
- Holy Trinity Episcopal Academy

== Gallery ==
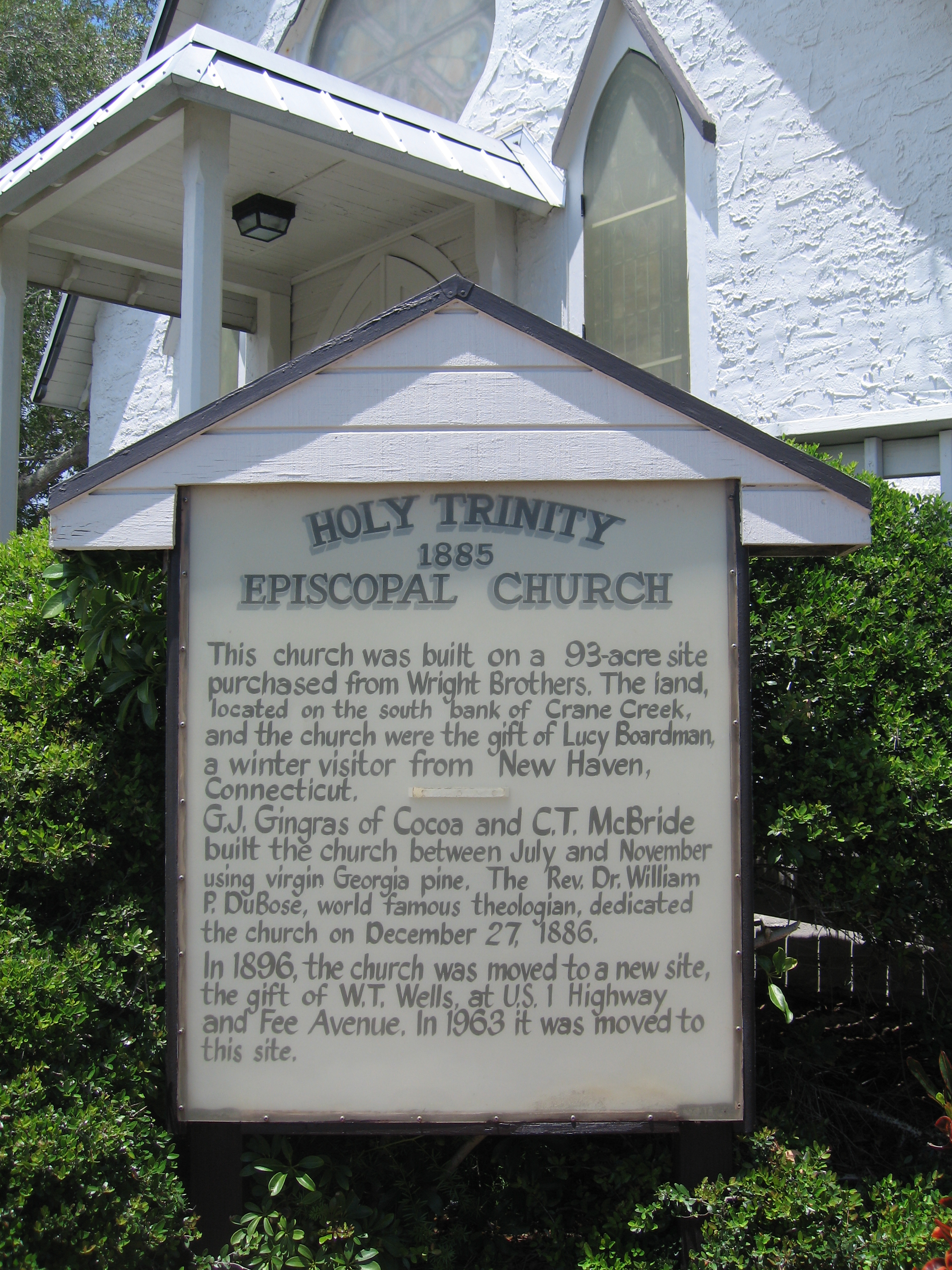
Sign in front of church

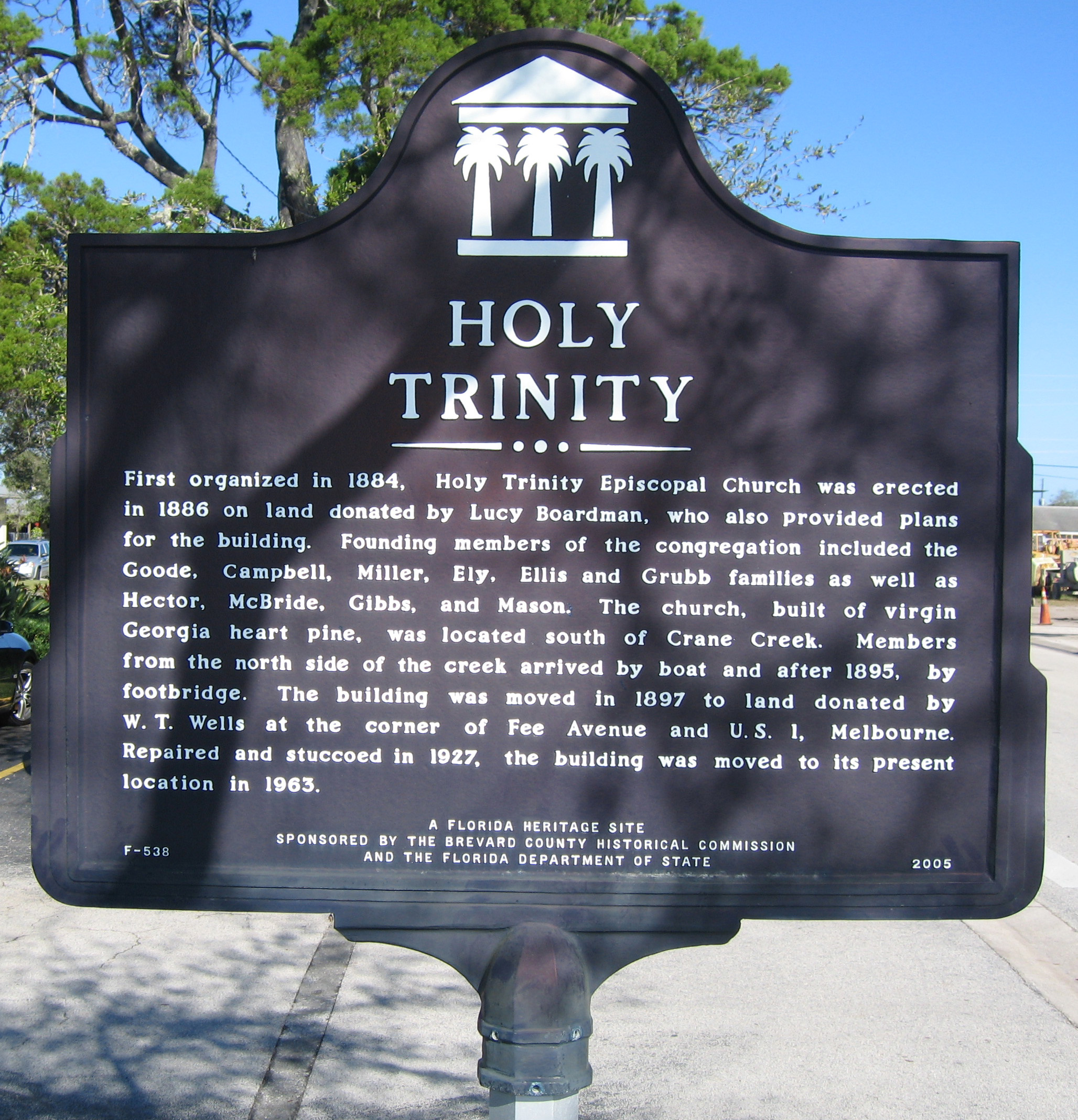
Historical Marker at the church
