= 2020 New York Jets season =

61st season in franchise history

- Owner: Woody & Christopher Johnson
- General manager: Joe Douglas
- Head coach: Adam Gase
- Home stadium: MetLife Stadium

Results
- Record: 2–14
- Division place: 4th AFC East
- Playoffs: Did not qualify
- Pro Bowlers: None

Uniform
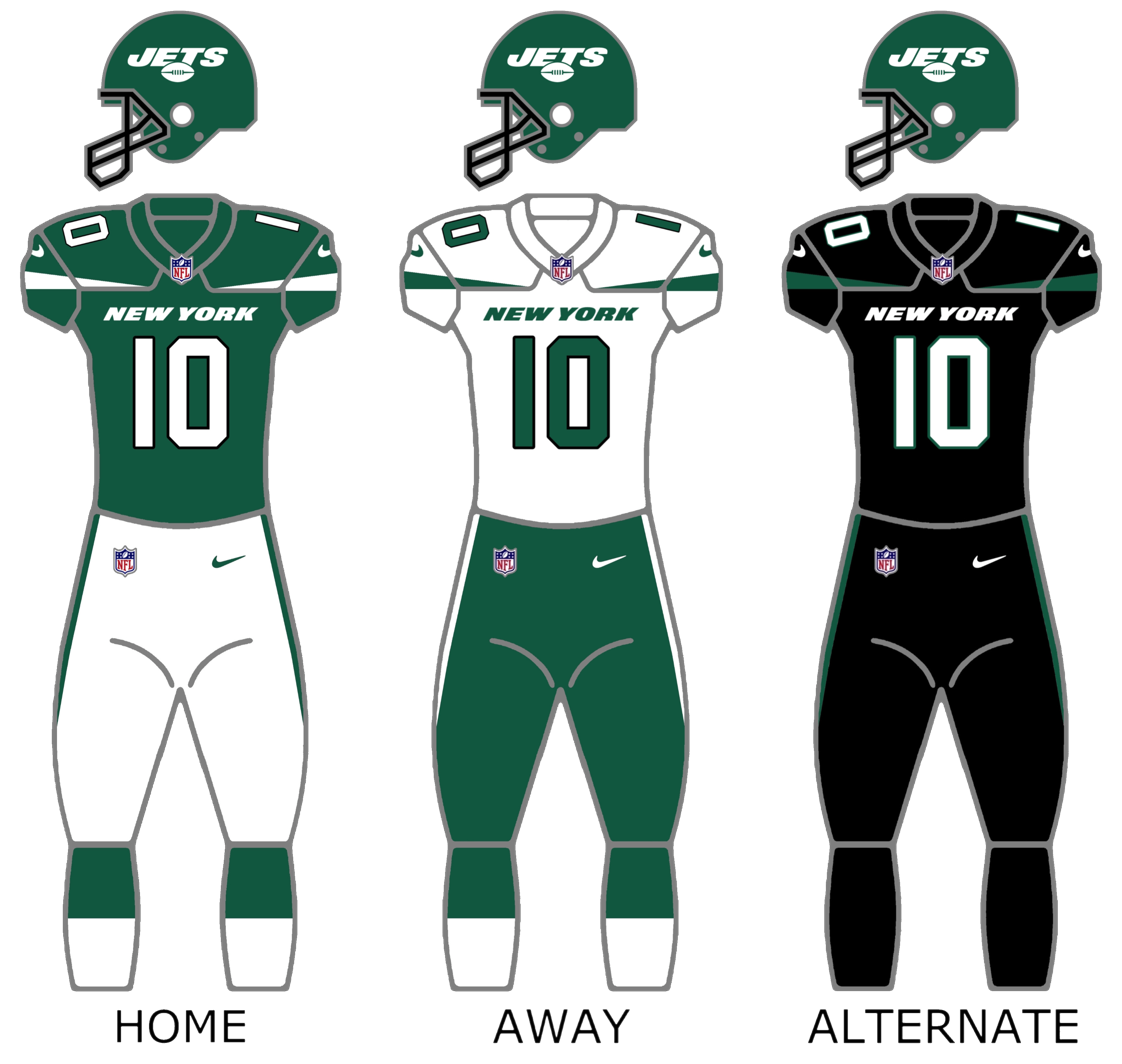

The 2020 season was the New York Jets' 51st in the National Football League (NFL), their 61st overall, their first under general manager Joe Douglas and their second and final under head coach Adam Gase. They failed to improve upon their 7–9 record from 2019 or return to the playoffs for the first time since 2010. Their 2–14 record was their worst record since their 1996 campaign in which they went 1–15, and shortly after the Jets closed their season with a loss to the New England Patriots the team fired Gase as head coach.

The Jets became the first team to be eliminated from playoff contention after a loss in Week 11 dropped them to 0–10. They continued their losing streak to Week 14, resulting in a franchise-worst 0–13 start, before they claimed their first victory in Week 15 against the Los Angeles Rams to prevent a winless season. Their point differential of −214 was the worst of all teams during the season. With the Cleveland Browns and Tampa Bay Buccaneers qualifying for the postseason for the first time since 2002 and 2007 respectively, the Jets now have the longest active postseason drought in the NFL, with 2010 being the last season the Jets qualified for the postseason.

On July 20, the Jets confirmed that their home games would take place behind closed doors due to the ongoing COVID-19 pandemic in the United States.

== Roster changes ==
=== Free agents ===
==== Unrestricted ====
Position	Player	2020 Team	Date signed	Contract
WR	Robby Anderson	Carolina Panthers	April 1	2 years, $20.000 million
OT	Kelvin Beachum	Arizona Cardinals	July 18	1 year, $1.1875 million
CB	Maurice Canady	Dallas Cowboys	March 18	1 year, $1.250 million
OG	Tom Compton	San Francisco 49ers	April 3	1 year, $2.750 million
DE	Brandon Copeland	New England Patriots	March 22	1 year, $1.048 million
P	Lac Edwards	Buffalo Bills	August 19	1 year, $0.910 Million
QB	David Fales	New York Jets	April 23	1 year, $0.910 million
ILB	Neville Hewitt	New York Jets	March 25	1 year, $2.000 million
OLB	Jordan Jenkins	New York Jets	April 23	1 year, $5.000 million
C	Ryan Kalil			
ILB	Albert McClellan			
FS	Rontez Miles			
RB	Ty Montgomery	New Orleans Saints	May 15	1 year, $1.048 million
RB	Bilal Powell			
OT	Brent Qvale	Houston Texans	March 20	1 year, $1.048 million
OT	Brandon Shell	Seattle Seahawks	March 24	2 years, $9.000 million
QB	Trevor Siemian	Tennessee Titans	August 19	1 year, $0.910 million
WR	Demaryius Thomas			
OLB	Paul Worrilow	New York Jets	September 16	1 year, $0.204 million

==== Restricted ====
Position	Player	2020 Team	Date signed	Contract
ILB	James Burgess	New York Jets	April 7	1 year, $0.925 million
CB	Arthur Maulet	New York Jets	March 20	TBC

==== Exclusive-Rights ====
Position	Player	2020 Team	Date signed	Contract
ILB	B. J. Bello	New York Jets	April 23	1 year, $0.645 million
K	Sam Ficken	New York Jets	April 23	1 year, $0.495 million
OT	Leo Koloamatangi	New York Jets	April 23	1 year, $0.645 million
LB	Frankie Luvu	New York Jets	April 23	1 year, $0.645 million

=== Signings ===
Position	Player	2019 Team	Date signed	Contract
OG	Josh Andrews	Indianapolis Colts	April 2	1 year, $1.048 million
CB	Pierre Desir	Indianapolis Colts	April 2	1 year, $3.750 million
OT	George Fant	Seattle Seahawks	April 23	3 years, $27.300 million
C	Connor McGovern	Denver Broncos	March 30	3 years, $27.000 million
ILB	Patrick Onwuasor	Baltimore Ravens	April 6	1 year, $2.000 million
WR	Breshad Perriman	Tampa Bay Buccaneers	April 1	1 year, $6.500 million
OG	Greg Van Roten	Carolina Panthers	April 2	3 years, $10.500 million
RB	Frank Gore	Buffalo Bills	May 5	1 year, $1.050 million
QB	Joe Flacco	Denver Broncos	May 22	1 year, $1.500 million

=== Releases ===
Position	Player	2020 Team	Date released
CB	Trumaine Johnson	Carolina Panthers	March 18
CB	Darryl Roberts	Detroit Lions	March 21
WR	Quincy Enunwa		August 3
RB	Le'Veon Bell	Kansas City Chiefs	October 13

== Draft ==
2020 New York Jets Draft
Round	Selection	Player	Position	College	Notes
1	11	Mekhi Becton	OT	Louisville	
2	59	Denzel Mims	WR	Baylor	from Seattle Seahawks
3	68	Ashtyn Davis	FS	California	from New York Giants
3	79	Jabari Zuniga	DE	Florida	
4	120	La'Mical Perine	RB	Florida	
4	125	James Morgan	QB	Florida International	from New England Patriots
4	129	Cameron Clark	OT	Charlotte	from New England Patriots
5	158	Bryce Hall	CB	Virginia	
6	191	Braden Mann	P	Texas A&M	

Pre-Draft Trades

- The Jets traded defensive end Leonard Williams to the New York Giants in exchange for a 2020 third-round selection and a conditional fifth-round selection in the 2021 NFL draft.
- The Jets traded a seventh-round selection to the Baltimore Ravens in exchange for guard Alex Lewis.

In-Draft Trades

- The Jets traded a second-round selection (48th) to the Seattle Seahawks in exchange for a second- and a third-round selection (59th and 101st).
- The New York Jets traded a third-round selection (101st) to the New England Patriots in exchange for two fourth-round selections (125th and 129th) and a 2021 sixth-round selection.
- The Jets traded their sixth-round selection (211th) to the Indianapolis Colts in exchange for CB Quincy Wilson.

=== Undrafted free agents ===
Player	Position	College	Source
Sterling Johnson	DT	Coastal Carolina	
Domenique Davis	DT	UNC Pembroke	
Lamar Jackson	CB	Nebraska	
Javelin Guidry	CB	Utah	
Bryce Huff	LB	Memphis	
Lawrence Cager	WR	Georgia	
Jared Hilbers	OT	Washington	
Shyheim Carter	S	Alabama	
George Campbell	WR	West Virginia	

== Staff ==
2020 New York Jets staff
Front office: Owner – Woody Johnson; Chairman/CEO – Christopher Johnson; President – Hymie Elhai; General manager – Joe Douglas; Assistant general manager – Rex Hogan; Senior director, football administration – Dave Socie; Director of player personnel – Chad Alexander; Director of college scouting – Jon Carr; Head coaches: Head coach – Adam Gase; Assistant head coach offense/wide receivers – Shawn Jefferson; Assistant head coach/interim defensive coordinator/inside linebackers – Frank Bush; Offensive coaches: Offensive coordinator/quarterbacks – Dowell Loggains; Running backs – Jim Bob Cooter; Tight ends – John Dunn; Offensive line – Frank Pollack; Assistant offensive line – Derek Frazier; Offensive assistant – Bo Hardegree; Offensive assistant – Hines Ward; Offensive assistant – Todd Washington	Defensive coaches: Defensive line – Andre Carter; Senior defensive assistant/outside linebackers – Joe Vitt; Passing game coordinator/defensive backs – Dennard Wilson; Assistant defensive backs – Leigh Torrence; Defensive assistant – Mack Brown; Defensive assistant – Chip Vaughn; Defensive assistant – Blake Williams; Special teams coaches: Special teams coordinator – Brant Boyer; Assistant special teams – Jeff Hammerschmidt; Strength and conditioning: Head strength and conditioning – Justus Galac; Assistant strength and conditioning – Aaron McLaurin and Joe Giacobbe

== Final roster ==
2020 New York Jets roster
Quarterbacks (QB): 14 Sam Darnold; 5 Joe Flacco; 4 James Morgan; Running backs (RB): 36 Josh Adams; 25 Ty Johnson; Wide receivers (WR): 10 Braxton Berrios; 86 Lawrence Cager; 82 Jamison Crowder; 11 Denzel Mims; 19 Breshad Perriman; 16 Jeff Smith; 17 Vyncint Smith; Tight ends (TE): 87 Daniel Brown; 84 Ryan Griffin; 89 Chris Herndon; 43 Ross Travis; 85 Trevon Wesco	Offensive linemen (OL): 77 Mekhi Becton T; 72 Cameron Clark G; 75 Chuma Edoga T; 67 Pat Elflein G; 76 George Fant T; 69 Conor McDermott T; 60 Connor McGovern C; 61 James Murray C; 62 Greg Van Roten G; Defensive linemen (DL): 96 Henry Anderson DE; 70 Trevon Coley DE; 94 Folorunso Fatukasi NT; 91 John Franklin-Myers DE; 97 Nathan Shepherd DE; 79 Tanzel Smart DE	Linebackers (LB): 93 Tarell Basham OLB; 54 Sharif Finch OLB; 58 Bryce Hager ILB; 46 Neville Hewitt ILB; 47 Bryce Huff OLB; 50 Frankie Luvu OLB; 92 Jabari Zuniga OLB; Defensive backs (DB): 31 Blessuan Austin CB; 27 Corey Ballentine CB; 26 Elijah Campbell CB; 41 Matthias Farley FS; 40 Javelin Guidry CB; 37 Bryce Hall CB; 49 J. T. Hassell S; 38 Lamar Jackson CB; 23 Arthur Maulet CB; 20 Marcus Maye FS; Special teams (ST): 42 Thomas Hennessy LS; 7 Braden Mann P; 3 Chase McLaughlin K	Practice squad: 6 Sergio Castillo K/P; 45 Connor Davis TE; 56 Noah Dawkins ILB; 35 Pete Guerriero RB; 45 Bronson Kaufusi TE; 65 Corbin Kaufusi T; 33 Zane Lewis CB; 83 Josh Malone WR; 81 D. J. Montgomery WR; 1 Jaleel Scott WR; 55 Brady Sheldon LB; 8 Mike White QB; Reserve: 68 Josh Andrews C (IR); 35 Kyron Brown CB (PUP); 53 Blake Cashman ILB (IR); 32 Ashtyn Davis SS (IR); 18 Josh Doctson WR (Opt-out); 21 Frank Gore RB (IR); 29 Saquan Hampton S (IR); 39 Bennett Jackson S (IR); 48 Jordan Jenkins OLB (IR); 63 Leo Koloamatangi C (Opt-out); 44 Harvey Langi ILB (IR); 71 Alex Lewis G (IR/DFR); 30 Bradley McDougald FS (IR); 57 C. J. Mosley ILB (Opt-out); 51 Patrick Onwuasor ILB (IR); 22 La'Mical Perine RB (COVID-19); 98 Kyle Phillips DE (IR); 34 Brian Poole CB (IR); 95 Quinnen Williams DE (IR); Rookies in italics 52 active, 19 reserve, 12 practice squad

== Preseason ==
The Jets' preseason schedule was announced on May 7, but was later cancelled due to the COVID-19 pandemic.

Week	Date	Opponent	Venue	Result
1	August 13	New York Giants	MetLife Stadium	Cancelled due to the COVID-19 pandemic
2	August 20	at Detroit Lions	Ford Field	Cancelled due to the COVID-19 pandemic
3	August 28	Pittsburgh Steelers	MetLife Stadium	Cancelled due to the COVID-19 pandemic
4	September 3	at Philadelphia Eagles	Lincoln Financial Field	Cancelled due to the COVID-19 pandemic

== Regular season ==
=== Schedule ===
The Jets' 2020 schedule was announced on May 7.

Week	Date	Opponent	Result	Record	Venue	Recap
1	September 13	at **Buffalo Bills**	**L** 17–27	0–1	Bills Stadium	Recap
2	September 20	San Francisco 49ers	**L** 13–31	0–2	MetLife Stadium	Recap
3	September 27	at Indianapolis Colts	**L** 7–36	0–3	Lucas Oil Stadium	Recap
4	October 1	Denver Broncos	**L** 28–37	0–4	MetLife Stadium	Recap
5	October 11	Arizona Cardinals	**L** 10–30	0–5	MetLife Stadium	Recap
6	October 18	at **Miami Dolphins**	**L** 0–24	0–6	Hard Rock Stadium	Recap
7	October 25	**Buffalo Bills**	**L** 10–18	0–7	MetLife Stadium	Recap
8	November 1	at Kansas City Chiefs	**L** 9–35	0–8	Arrowhead Stadium	Recap
9	November 9	**New England Patriots**	**L** 27–30	0–9	MetLife Stadium	Recap
10	Bye					
11	November 22	at Los Angeles Chargers	**L** 28–34	0–10	SoFi Stadium	Recap
12	November 29	**Miami Dolphins**	**L** 3–20	0–11	MetLife Stadium	Recap
13	December 6	Las Vegas Raiders	**L** 28–31	0–12	MetLife Stadium	Recap
14	December 13	at Seattle Seahawks	**L** 3–40	0–13	Lumen Field	Recap
15	December 20	at Los Angeles Rams	**W** 23–20	1–13	SoFi Stadium	Recap
16	December 27	Cleveland Browns	**W** 23–16	2–13	MetLife Stadium	Recap
17	January 3	at **New England Patriots**	**L** 14–28	2–14	Gillette Stadium	Recap

Note: Intra-division opponents are in bold text.

=== Game summaries ===
==== Week 1: at Buffalo Bills ====
Week One: New York Jets at Buffalo Bills – Game summary

Quarter	1	2	3	4	Total
Jets	0	3	7	7	**17**
**Bills**	14	7	0	6	**27**

at Bills Stadium, Orchard Park, New York

- Date: September 13
- Game time: 1:00 p.m. EDT
- Game weather: Cloudy, 67 °F (19 °C)
- Game attendance: 0
- Referee: Shawn Smith
- TV announcers (CBS): Andrew Catalon, James Lofton and A.J. Ross
- Recap, Game Book

Game information

**First quarter**

- BUF – Josh Allen 2-yards run (Tyler Bass kick), 5:38. Bills 7–0. **Drive: 7 plays, 55 yards, 3:54.**
- BUF – Zack Moss 2-yards pass from Josh Allen (Tyler Bass kick), 2:32. Bills 14–0. **Drive: 6 plays, 82 yards, 2:35.**

**Second quarter**

- BUF – John Brown 17-yards pass from Josh Allen (Tyler Bass kick), 6:48. Bills 21–0. **Drive: 14 plays, 68 yards, 7:58.**
- NYJ – Sam Ficken 31-yards field goal, 0:00. Bills 21–3. **Drive: 10 plays, 75 yards, 1:27.**

**Third quarter**

- NYJ – Jamison Crowder 69-yards pass from Sam Darnold (Sam Ficken kick), 5:10. Bills 21–10. **Drive: 3 plays, 72 yards, 0:48.**

**Fourth quarter**

- BUF – Tyler Bass 22-yards field goal, 10:38. Bills 24–10. **Drive: 10 plays, 34 yards, 3:49.**
- BUF – Tyler Bass 19-yards field goal, 3:15. Bills 27–10. **Drive: 11 plays, 63 yards, 6:29.**
- NYJ – Josh Adams 2-yards run (Sam Ficken kick), 0:54. Bills 27–17. **Drive: 11 plays, 86 yards, 2:21.**

**Top scorers**

- NYJ – Sam Darnold 21/35, 215 yards, TD, INT
- BUF – Josh Allen 33/46, 312 yards, 2 TD

**Top rushers**

- NYJ – Frank Gore 6 rushes, 24 yards
- BUF – Josh Allen 14 rushes, 57 yards, TD

**Top receivers**

- NYJ – Jamison Crowder 7 receptions, 115 yards, TD
- BUF – Stefon Diggs 8 receptions, 86 yards

The Jets started their season with a loss, starting 0–1.

==== Week 2: vs. San Francisco 49ers ====
Week Two: San Francisco 49ers at New York Jets – Game summary

Quarter	1	2	3	4	Total
**49ers**	7	14	3	7	**31**
Jets	3	0	3	7	**13**

at MetLife Stadium, East Rutherford, New Jersey

- Date: September 20
- Game time: 1:00 p.m. EDT
- Game weather: Mostly sunny, 61 °F (16 °C)
- Game attendance: 0
- Referee: Ronald Torbert
- TV announcers (Fox): Brandon Gaudin, Jonathan Vilma and Shannon Spake
- Recap, Game Book

Game information

**First quarter**

- SF – Raheem Mostert 80-yard run (Robbie Gould kick), 14:43. 49ers 7–0. **Drive: 1 play, 80 yards, 0:17.**
- NYJ – Sam Ficken 41-yard field goal, 3:43. 49ers 7–3. **Drive: 13 plays, 38 yards, 6:43.**

**Second quarter**

- SF – Jordan Reed 18-yard pass from Jimmy Garoppolo (Robbie Gould kick), 9:55. 49ers 14–3. **Drive: 14 plays, 77 yards, 8:44.**
- SF – Jordan Reed 4-yard pass from Jimmy Garoppolo (Robbie Gould kick), 0:11. 49ers 21–3. **Drive: 13 plays, 80 yards, 3:30.**

**Third quarter**

- SF – Robbie Gould 46-yard field goal, 8:53. 49ers 24–3. **Drive: 7 plays, 40 yards, 4:41.**
- NYJ – Sam Ficken 25-yard field goal, 2:52. 49ers 24–6. **Drive: 5 plays, 15 yards, 1:50.**

**Fourth quarter**

- SF – Jerick McKinnon 18-yard run (Robbie Gould kick), 10:23. 49ers 31–6. **Drive: 4 plays, 75 yards, 2:39.**
- NYJ – Braxton Berrios 30-yard pass from Sam Darnold (Sam Ficken kick), 1:23. 49ers 31–13. **Drive: 7 plays, 80 yards, 1:34.**

**Top passers**

- SF – Jimmy Garoppolo – 14/16, 131 yards, 2 TD
- NYJ – Sam Darnold – 21/32, 179 yards, TD

**Top rushers**

- SF – Raheem Mostert – 8 rushes, 92 yards, TD
- NYJ – Frank Gore – 21 rushes, 63 yards

**Top receivers**

- SF – Kendrick Bourne – 4 receptions, 67 yards
- NYJ – Chris Hogan – 6 receptions, 75 yards

The Jets have not won a home opener since 2015. The Jets dropped to 0–2.

==== Week 3: at Indianapolis Colts ====
Week Three: New York Jets at Indianapolis Colts – Game summary

Quarter	1	2	3	4	Total
Jets	7	0	0	0	**7**
**Colts**	7	10	14	5	**36**

at Lucas Oil Stadium, Indianapolis, Indiana

- Date: September 27
- Game time: 4:05 p.m. EDT
- Game weather: Sunny, 79 °F (26 °C) (retractable roof open)
- Game attendance: 7,480
- Referee: Craig Wrolstad
- TV announcers (CBS): Kevin Harlan, Trent Green and Melanie Collins
- Recap, Game Book

Game information

**First quarter**

- IND – Xavier Rhodes 44-yard interception return (Rodrigo Blankenship kick), 12:25. Colts 7–0.
- NYJ – Braxton Berrios 16-yard pass from Sam Darnold (Sam Ficken kick), 5:12. Tied 7–7. **Drive: 14 plays, 88 yards, 7:13.**

**Second quarter**

- IND – Mo Alie-Cox 1-yard pass from Philip Rivers (Rodrigo Blankenship kick), 14:13. Colts 14–7. **Drive: 11 plays, 75 yards, 5:59.**
- IND – Rodrigo Blankenship 42-yard field goal, 8:38. Colts 17–7. **Drive: 6 plays, 53 yards, 2:51.**

**Third quarter**

- IND – Jonathan Taylor 1-yard run (Rodrigo Blankenship kick), 5:21. Colts 24–7. **Drive: 10 plays, 55 yards, 5:07.**
- IND – T. J. Carrie 44-yard interception return (Rodrigo Blankenship kick), 0:00. Colts 31–7.

**Fourth quarter**

- IND – Sam Darnold sacked in end zone by Justin Houston for a safety, 4:50. Colts 33–7.
- IND – Rodrigo Blankenship 41-yard field goal, 2:04. Colts 36–7. **Drive: 5 plays, 33 yards, 2:46.**

**Top passers**

- NYJ – Sam Darnold – 17/29, 168 yards, TD, 3 INT
- IND – Philip Rivers – 17/21, 217 yards, TD

**Top rushers**

- NYJ – Frank Gore – 15 rushes, 57 yards
- IND – Jonathan Taylor – 13 rushes, 59 yards, TD

**Top passers**

- NYJ – Braxton Berrios – 4 receptions, 64 yards, TD
- IND – T. Y. Hilton – 3 receptions, 52 yards

With the loss, the Jets dropped to 0–3.

==== Week 4: vs. Denver Broncos ====
Week Four: Denver Broncos at New York Jets – Game summary

Quarter	1	2	3	4	Total
**Broncos**	3	14	7	13	**37**
Jets	7	6	3	12	**28**

at MetLife Stadium, East Rutherford, New Jersey

- Date: October 1
- Game time: 8:20 p.m. EDT
- Game weather: Cloudy, 64 °F (18 °C)
- Game attendance: 0
- Referee: Jerome Boger
- TV announcers (NFLN): Joe Buck, Troy Aikman, Erin Andrews and Kristina Pink
- Recap, Game Book

Game information

**First quarter**

- NYJ – Sam Darnold 46-yard run (Sam Ficken kick), 11:25. Jets 7–0. **Drive: 9 plays, 75 yards, 3:35.**
- DEN – Brandon McManus 40-yard field goal, 4:45. Jets 7–3. **Drive: 10 plays, 70 yards, 6:40.**

**Second quarter**

- DEN – Jerry Jeudy 48-yard pass from Brett Rypien (Brandon McManus kick), 13:09. Broncos 10–7. **Drive: 3 plays, 70 yards, 1:44.**
- NYJ – Sam Ficken 26-yard field goal, 6:21. Tied 10–10. **Drive: 11 plays, 55 yards, 4:44.**
- DEN – Melvin Gordon 1-yard run (Brandon McManus kick), 1:37. Broncos 17–10. **Drive: 9 plays, 75 yards, 4:44.**
- NYJ – Sam Ficken 38-yard field goal, 0:15. Broncos 17–13. **Drive: 11 plays, 55 yards, 1:22.**

**Third quarter**

- NYJ – Sam Ficken 32-yard field goal, 11:23. Broncos 17–16. **Drive: 5 plays, 46 yards, 2:00.**
- DEN – Tim Patrick 7-yard pass from Brett Rypien (Brandon McManus kick), 4:31. Broncos 24–16. **Drive: 13 plays, 75 yards, 6:52.**

**Fourth quarter**

- DEN – Brandon McManus 54-yard field goal, 14:11. Broncos 27–16. **Drive: 4 plays, 8 yards, 1:41.**
- NYJ – Sam Ficken 54-yard field goal, 11:44. Broncos 27–19. **Drive: 7 plays, 39 yards, 2:27.**
- NYJ – Pierre Desir 35-yard interception return (pass failed), 10:45. Broncos 27–25.
- NYJ – Sam Ficken 36-yard field goal, 6:23. Jets 28–27. **Drive: 6 plays, 25 yards, 2:14.**
- DEN – Brandon McManus 53-yard field goal, 3:08. Broncos 30–28. **Drive: 9 plays, 40 yards, 3:15.**
- DEN – Melvin Gordon 43-yard run (Brandon McManus kick), 1:48. Broncos 37–28. **Drive: 1 play, 43 yards, 0:12.**

**Top passers**

- DEN – Brett Rypien – 19/31, 242 yards, 2 TD, 3 INT
- NYJ – Sam Darnold – 23/42, 230 yards

**Top rushers**

- DEN – Melvin Gordon – 23 rushes, 107 yards, 2 TD
- NYJ – Sam Darnold – 6 rushes, 84 yards, TD

**Top receivers**

- DEN – Tim Patrick – 6 receptions, 113 yards, TD
- NYJ – Jamison Crowder – 7 receptions, 104 yards

With the loss, the Jets dropped to 0–4 for a second consecutive season. It marked the first time in franchise history they've suffered consecutive seasons when they started 0–4.

==== Week 5: vs. Arizona Cardinals ====
Week Five: Arizona Cardinals at New York Jets – Game summary

Quarter	1	2	3	4	Total
**Cardinals**	7	10	7	6	**30**
Jets	0	3	7	0	**10**

at MetLife Stadium, East Rutherford, New Jersey

- Date: October 11
- Game time: 1:00 p.m. EDT
- Game weather: Cloudy, 64 °F (18 °C)
- Game attendance: 0
- Referee: Adrian Hill
- TV announcers (Fox): Kevin Kugler, Chris Spielman and Laura Okmin
- Recap, Game Book

Game information

**First quarter**

- ARI – Chase Edmonds 29-yard run (Zane Gonzalez kick), 7:33. Cardinals 7–0. **Drive: 8 plays, 89 yards, 3:13.**

**Second quarter**

- NYJ – Sam Ficken 26-yard field goal, 7:01. Cardinals 7–3. **Drive: 4 plays, 2 yards, 0:47.**
- ARI – Kyler Murray 2-yard run (Zane Gonzalez kick), 2:41. Cardinals 14–3. **Drive: 10 plays, 75 yards, 4:20.**
- ARI – Zane Gonzalez 47-yard field goal, 0:03. Cardinals 17–3. **Drive: 6 plays, 52 yards, 0:50.**

**Third quarter**

- NYJ – Jamison Crowder 11-yard pass from Joe Flacco (Sam Ficken kick), 5:51. Cardinals 17–10. **Drive: 6 plays, 74 yards, 2:12.**
- ARI – Kenyan Drake 1-yard run (Zane Gonzalez kick), 0:15. Cardinals 24–10. **Drive: 10 plays, 70 yards, 5:36.**

**Fourth quarter**

- ARI – DeAndre Hopkins 37-yard pass from Kyler Murray (pass failed), 8:35. Cardinals 30–10. **Drive: 6 plays, 96 yards, 2:42.**

**Top passers**

- ARI – Kyler Murray – 27/37, 380 yards, TD, INT
- NYJ – Joe Flacco – 18/33, 195 yards, TD

**Top rushers**

- ARI – Kenyan Drake – 18 rushes, 60 yards, TD
- NYJ – Le'Veon Bell – 13 rushes, 60 yards

**Top receivers**

- ARI – DeAndre Hopkins – 6 receptions, 131 yards, TD
- NYJ – Jamison Crowder – 8 receptions, 116 yards, TD

With a 30–10 loss to the Cardinals in Week 5, the Jets experienced their first 0–5 start since their disastrous 1996 season. Two days later, the Jets released disgruntled running back Le'Veon Bell less than two years after signing him to a massive contract. This was also the first of two games in which backup Quarterback Joe Flacco started due to injuries to starting Quarterback Sam Darnold.

==== Week 6: at Miami Dolphins ====
Week Six: New York Jets at Miami Dolphins – Game summary

Quarter	1	2	3	4	Total
Jets	0	0	0	0	**0**
**Dolphins**	7	14	3	0	**24**

at Hard Rock Stadium, Miami, Florida

- Date: October 18
- Game time: 4:05 p.m EDT
- Game weather: Partly cloudy, 85 °F (29 °C)
- Game attendance: 10,772
- Referee: Bill Vinovich
- TV announcers (CBS): Andrew Catalon, James Lofton, and Sheree Burruss
- Recap, Game Book

Game information

**First quarter**

- MIA – Adam Shaheen 4-yard pass from Ryan Fitzpatrick (Jason Sanders kick), 6:55. Dolphins 7–0. **Drive: 8 plays, 66 yards, 4:44.**

**Second quarter**

- MIA – Preston Williams 3-yard pass from Ryan Fitzpatrick (Jason Sanders kick), 11:16. Dolphins 14–0. **Drive: 7 plays, 65 yards, 3:44.**
- MIA – Durham Smythe 4-yard pass from Ryan Fitzpatrick (Jason Sanders kick), 1:53. Dolphins 21–0. **Drive: 3 plays, 48 yards, 0:41.**

**Third quarter**

- MIA – Jason Sanders 24-yard field goal, 3:49. Dolphins 24–0. **Drive: 8 plays, 53 yards, 3:45.**

**Fourth quarter**

- No scoring plays.

**Top passers**

- NYJ – Joe Flacco – 21/44, 186 yards, INT
- MIA – Ryan Fitzpatrick – 18/27, 191 yards, 3 TD, 2 INT

**Top rushers**

- NYJ – Frank Gore – 11 rushes, 46 yards
- MIA – Myles Gaskin – 18 rushes, 91 yards

**Top passers**

- NYJ – Breshad Perriman – 4 receptions, 62 yards
- MIA – Adam Shaheen – 3 receptions, 51 yards, TD

With the shutout loss (the first shutout of the season), the Jets started 0–6 for the first time since the 1996 season. With the Giants and Falcons winning their first games this week, this left the Jets as the only winless team in the NFL for 2020.

==== Week 7: vs. Buffalo Bills ====
Week Seven: Buffalo Bills at New York Jets – Game summary

Quarter	1	2	3	4	Total
**Bills**	0	6	6	6	**18**
Jets	3	7	0	0	**10**

at MetLife Stadium, East Rutherford, New Jersey

- Date: October 25
- Game time: 1:00 p.m. EDT
- Game weather: Mostly cloudy, 52 °F (11 °C)
- Game attendance: 0
- Referee: Carl Cheffers
- TV announcers (CBS): Greg Gumbel, Rich Gannon, and AJ Ross
- Recap, Game Book

Game information

**First quarter**

- NYJ – Sergio Castillo 29-yard field goal, 8:46. Jets 3–0. **Drive: 11 plays, 67 yards, 6:14.**

**Second quarter**

- NYJ – La'Mical Perine 5-yard run (Sergio Castillo kick), 7:22. Jets 10–0. **Drive: 7 plays, 80 yards, 3:38.**
- BUF – Tyler Bass 53-yard field goal, 2:42. Jets 10–3. **Drive: 10 plays, 42 yards, 4:40.**
- BUF – Tyler Bass 48-yard field goal, 0:00. Jets 10–6. **Drive: 6 plays, 43 yards, 0:40.**

**Third quarter**

- BUF – Tyler Bass 46-yard field goal, 10:35. Jets 10–9. **Drive: 9 plays, 19 yards, 4:25.**
- BUF – Tyler Bass 37-yard field goal, 1:37. Bills 12–10. **Drive: 14 plays, 73 yards, 7:23.**

**Fourth quarter**

- BUF – Tyler Bass 29-yard field goal, 6:01. Bills 15–10. **Drive: 8 plays, 46 yards, 4:28.**
- BUF – Tyler Bass 40-yard field goal, 1:56. Bills 18–10. **Drive: 8 plays, 37 yards, 3:22.**

**Top passers**

- BUF – Josh Allen – 30/43, 307 yards
- NYJ – Sam Darnold – 12/23, 120 yards, 2 INT

**Top rushers**

- BUF – Josh Allen – 11 rushes, 61 yards
- NYJ – Frank Gore – 11 rushes, 60 yards

**Top receivers**

- BUF – Cole Beasley – 11 receptions, 112 yards
- NYJ – Denzel Mims – 4 receptions, 42 yards

Amidst heavy criticism, Head Coach Adam Gase gave up offensive play calling duties, instead leaving it to Offensive Coordinator Dowell Loggains. Under Loggains, the Jets were able to build a 10–6 lead over the Bills by halftime after a Sergio Castillo field goal and La'Mical Perine touchdown. Despite this, the Jets offense struggled in the second half. While the Jets were able to prevent Buffalo from scoring touchdowns, the Bills were able to score enough field goals to hand the Jets an 18–10 loss. With this loss, the Jets dropped to 0–7 for the first time since 1996.

==== Week 8: at Kansas City Chiefs ====
Week Eight: New York Jets at Kansas City Chiefs – Game summary

Quarter	1	2	3	4	Total
Jets	3	6	0	0	**9**
**Chiefs**	14	7	7	7	**35**

at Arrowhead Stadium, Kansas City, Missouri

- Date: November 1
- Game time: 1:00 p.m. EST/12:00 p.m. CST
- Game weather: Sunny, 52 °F (11 °C)
- Game attendance: 11,932
- Referee: Land Clark
- TV announcers (CBS): Kevin Harlan, Trent Green and Melanie Collins
- Recap, Game Book

Game information

**First quarter**

- KC – Mecole Hardman 30-yard pass from Patrick Mahomes (Harrison Butker kick), 11:08. Chiefs 7–0. **Drive: 7 plays, 90 yards, 3:52.**
- NYJ – Sergio Castillo 39-yard field goal, 4:39. Chiefs 7–3. **Drive: 12 plays, 54 yards, 6:29.**
- KC – Tyreek Hill 36-yard pass from Patrick Mahomes (Harrison Butker kick), 1:17. Chiefs 14–3. **Drive: 7 plays, 73 yards, 3:22.**

**Second quarter**

- NYJ – Sergio Castillo 55-yard field goal, 13:02. Chiefs 14–6. **Drive: 7 plays, 38 yards, 3:15.**
- NYJ – Sergio Castillo 48-yard field goal, 2:55. Chiefs 14–9. **Drive: 13 plays, 51 yards, 7:02.**
- KC – Travis Kelce 3-yard pass from Patrick Mahomes (Harrison Butker kick), 0:58. Chiefs 21–3. **Drive: 7 plays, 76 yards, 1:57.**

**Third quarter**

- KC – Demarcus Robinson 26-yard pass from Patrick Mahomes (Harrison Butker kick), 2:15. Chiefs 28–3. **Drive: 6 plays, 83 yards, 3:21.**

**Fourth quarter**

- KC – Tyreek Hill 41-yard pass from Patrick Mahomes (Harrison Butker kick), 10:58. Chiefs 35–9. **Drive: 6 plays, 65 yards, 2:10.**

**Top passers**

- NYJ – Sam Darnold – 18/30, 133 yards
- KC – Patrick Mahomes – 31/42, 416 yards, 5 TD

**Top rushers**

- NYJ – Frank Gore – 10 rushes, 30 yards
- KC – Clyde Edwards-Helaire – 6 rushes, 21 yards

**Top receivers**

- NYJ – Denzel Mims – 2 receptions, 42 yards
- KC – Travis Kelce – 8 receptions, 109 yards, TD

With the loss, the Jets fell to 0–8. It would be their first such start since 1996.

==== Week 9: vs. New England Patriots ====
Week Nine: New England Patriots at New York Jets – Game summary

Quarter	1	2	3	4	Total
**Patriots**	7	3	7	13	**30**
Jets	3	17	7	0	**27**

at MetLife Stadium, East Rutherford, New Jersey

- Date: November 9
- Game time: 8:15 p.m. EST
- Game weather: Clear, 61 °F (16 °C)
- Game attendance: 0
- Referee: Alex Kemp
- TV announcers (ESPN): Steve Levy, Brian Griese, Louis Riddick, Lisa Salters and John Parry
- Recap, Game Book

Game information

**First quarter**

- NYJ – Sergio Castillo 35-yard field goal, 8:33. Jets 3–0. **Drive: 12 plays, 58 yards, 6:27.**
- NE – Cam Newton 5-yard run (Nick Folk kick), 3:34. Patriots 7–3. **Drive: 8 plays, 75 yards, 4:59.**

**Second quarter**

- NYJ – Breshad Perriman 50-yard pass from Joe Flacco (Sergio Castillo kick), 9:59. Jets 10–7. **Drive: 5 plays, 93 yards, 2:44.**
- NYJ – Sergio Castillo 50-yard field goal, 4:33. Jets 13–7. **Drive: 5 plays, 25 yards, 1:40.**
- NE – Nick Folk 45-yard field goal, 1:03. Jets 13–10. **Drive: 9 plays, 54 yards, 3:30.**
- NYJ – Jamison Crowder 50-yard pass from Joe Flacco (Sergio Castillo kick), 0:25. Jets 20–10. **Drive: 2 plays, 77 yards, 0:38.**

**Third quarter**

- NE – Rex Burkhead 1-yard run (Nick Folk kick), 7:27. Jets 20–17. **Drive: 13 plays, 78 yards, 7:33.**
- NYJ – Breshad Perriman 15-yard pass from Joe Flacco (Sergio Castillo kick), 0:30. Jets 27–17. **Drive: 11 plays, 75 yards, 6:57.**

**Fourth quarter**

- NE – Nick Folk 29-yard field goal, 6:04. Jets 27–20. **Drive: 17 plays, 58 yards, 9:26.**
- NE – Cam Newton 1-yard run (Nick Folk kick), 1:57. Tied 27–27. **Drive: 11 plays, 72 yards, 3:53.**
- NE – Nick Folk 51-yard field goal, 0:00. Patriots 30–27. **Drive: 8 plays, 45 yards, 0:47.**

**Top passers**

- NE – Cam Newton – 27/35, 274 yards
- NYJ – Joe Flacco – 18/25, 262 yards, 3 TD, 1 INT

**Top rushers**

- NE – Damien Harris – 14 rushes, 71 yards
- NYJ – Frank Gore – 12 rushes, 46 yards

**Top receivers**

- NE – Jakobi Meyers – 12 receptions, 169 yards
- NYJ – Breshad Perriman – 5 receptions, 101 yards, 2 TD

After Sam Darnold suffered a shoulder injury, Joe Flacco would start for the New York Jets once again. Facing an injury-plagued New England Patriots team, the game was seen as a big chance for the Jets to get their first win of the season. Flacco threw touchdown passes to Breshad Perriman and Jamison Crowder, alongside two Sergio Castillo field goals to lead 20–10 at halftime. However, the Patriots rallied and in the final five minutes of the game, following a crucial interception by Joe Flacco, the Patriots were able to tie the game 27–27. As time expired, Nick Folk kicked the game winning field goal for the New England win. With the loss, the Jets started 0–9 for the first time in franchise history while losing their 9th consecutive game to the Patriots since 2015. They were also eliminated from AFC East division title contention for the eighteenth consecutive season.

==== Week 11: at Los Angeles Chargers ====
Week Eleven: New York Jets at Los Angeles Chargers – Game summary

Quarter	1	2	3	4	Total
Jets	6	0	13	9	**28**
**Chargers**	7	17	7	3	**34**

at SoFi Stadium, Inglewood, California

- Date: November 22
- Game time: 4:05 p.m. EST/1:05 p.m. PST
- Game weather: Clear, 69 °F (21 °C)
- Game attendance: 0
- Referee: Craig Wrolstad
- TV announcers (CBS): Greg Gumbel, Rich Gannon and Jay Feely
- Recap, Game Book

Game information

**First quarter**

- NYJ – La'Mical Perine 5-yard run (kick failed), 9:05. Jets 6–0. **Drive: 4 plays, 29 yards, 1:59.**
- LAC – Tevaughn Campbell 6-yard interception return (Michael Badgley kick), 3:20. Chargers 7–6.

**Second quarter**

- LAC – Mike Williams 39-yard pass from Justin Herbert (Michael Badgley kick), 14:17. Chargers 14–6. **Drive: 5 plays, 57 yards, 1:48.**
- LAC – Hunter Henry 2-yard pass from Justin Herbert (Michael Badgley kick), 10:01. Chargers 21–6. **Drive: 7 plays, 72 yards, 2:59.**
- LAC – Michael Badgley 44-yard field goal, 0:00. Chargers 24–6. **Drive: 7 plays, 60 yards, 1:16.**

**Third quarter**

- NYJ – Breshad Perriman 49-yard pass from Joe Flacco (Sam Ficken kick), 11:27. Chargers 24–13. **Drive: 7 plays, 74 yards, 3:33.**
- LAC – Keenan Allen 13-yard pass from Justin Herbert (Michael Badgley kick), 5:53. Chargers 31–13. **Drive: 12 plays, 75 yards, 5:54.**
- NYJ – Frank Gore 1-yard run (kick failed), 0:22. Chargers 31–19. **Drive: 10 plays, 75 yards, 5:11.**

**Fourth quarter**

- LAC – Michael Badgley 23-yard field goal, 6:42. Chargers 34–19. **Drive: 16 plays, 70 yards, 8:40.**
- NYJ – Chris Herndon 6-yard pass from Joe Flacco (Sam Ficken kick), 4:00. Chargers 34–26. **Drive: 9 plays, 75 yards, 2:42.**
- NYJ – Ty Long OB in end zone, forced by Frankie Luvu, for a Safety, 0:01. Chargers 34–28.

**Top passers**

- NYJ – Joe Flacco – 15/30, 205 yards, 2 TD, INT
- LAC – Justin Herbert – 37/49, 366 yards, 3 TD

**Top rushers**

- NYJ – Frank Gore – 15 rushes, 61 yards, TD
- LAC – Kalen Ballage – 16 rushes, 44 yards

**Top receivers**

- NYJ – Denzel Mims – 3 receptions, 71 yards
- LAC – Keenan Allen – 16 receptions, 145 yards, TD

The Jets started 0–10 for the first time in franchise history. With this loss, along with the Colts beating the Packers, the Jets became the first team to be eliminated from playoff contention. It also secured a full decade without postseason football for the Jets. The longest since the 1970's.

==== Week 12: vs. Miami Dolphins ====
Week Twelve: Miami Dolphins at New York Jets – Game summary

Quarter	1	2	3	4	Total
**Dolphins**	3	10	0	7	**20**
Jets	3	0	0	0	**3**

at MetLife Stadium, East Rutherford, New Jersey

- Date: November 29
- Game time: 1:00 p.m. EST
- Game weather: Sunny, 54 °F (12 °C)
- Game attendance: 0
- Referee: Adrian Hill
- TV announcers (CBS): Andrew Catalon, James Lofton and AJ Ross
- Recap, Game Book

Game information

**First quarter**

- NYJ – Sergio Castillo 38-yard field goal, 9:48. Jets 3–0. **Drive: 9 plays, 55 yards, 5:15.**
- MIA – Jason Sanders 54-yard field goal, 1:17. Tied 3–3. **Drive: 7 plays, 35 yards, 2:18.**

**Second quarter**

- MIA – Mike Gesicki 13-yard pass from Ryan Fitzpatrick (Jason Sanders kick), 8:56. Dolphins 10–3. **Drive: 10 plays, 88 yards, 5:11.**
- MIA – Jason Sanders 51-yard field goal, 5:57. Dolphins 13–3. **Drive: 6 plays, 36 yards, 2:30.**

**Third quarter**

- No scoring plays.

**Fourth quarter**

- MIA – Adam Shaheen 7-yard pass from Ryan Fitzpatrick (Jason Sanders kick), 6:54. Dolphins 20–3. **Drive: 7 plays, 80 yards, 3:39.**

**Top passers**

- MIA – Ryan Fitzpatrick – 24/39, 257 yards, 2 TD
- NYJ – Sam Darnold – 16/27, 197 yards, 2 INT

**Top rushers**

- MIA – DeAndre Washington – 13 rushes, 49 yards
- NYJ – Frank Gore – 18 rushes, 74 yards

**Top receivers**

- MIA – DeVante Parker – 8 receptions, 119 yards
- DEN – Breshad Perriman – 4 receptions, 79 yards

The Jets started 0–11 for the first time in franchise history, and their only score in the entire game came from a field goal put up in the first quarter by Sergio Castillo.

==== Week 13: vs. Las Vegas Raiders ====
Week Thirteen: Las Vegas Raiders at New York Jets – Game summary

Quarter	1	2	3	4	Total
**Raiders**	7	10	7	7	**31**
Jets	7	6	0	15	**28**

at MetLife Stadium, East Rutherford, New Jersey

- Date: December 6
- Game time: 1:00 p.m. EST
- Game weather: Sunny and Cold, 39 °F (4 °C)
- Game attendance: 0
- Referee: Shawn Smith
- TV announcers (CBS): Spero Dedes and Adam Archuleta
- Recap, Game Book

Game information

**First quarter**

- NYJ – Jamison Crowder 3-yard pass from Sam Darnold (Sergio Castillo kick), 9:03. Jets 7–0. **Drive: 12 plays, 74 yards, 5:57.**
- LV – Darren Waller 9-yard pass from Derek Carr (Daniel Carlson kick), 0:12. Tied 7–7. **Drive: 7 plays, 79 yards, 3:59.**

**Second quarter**

- NYJ – Jamison Crowder 6-yard pass from Sam Darnold (kick failed), 12:02. Jets 13–7. **Drive: 7 plays, 69 yards, 3:10.**
- LV – Daniel Carlson 48-yard field goal, 6:07. Jets 13–10. **Drive: 4 plays, 1 yard, 0:51.**
- LV – Darren Waller 38-yard pass from Derek Carr (Daniel Carlson kick), 1:12. Raiders 17–13. **Drive: 5 plays, 66 yards, 1:54.**

**Third quarter**

- LV – Derek Carr 2-yard run (Daniel Carlson kick), 7:52. Raiders 24–13. **Drive: 13 plays, 75 yards, 7:08.**

**Fourth quarter**

- NYJ – Sam Darnold 4-yard run (Sam Darnold–Denzel Mims pass), 10:22. Raiders 24–21. **Drive: 9 plays, 96 yards, 5:00.**
- NYJ – Ty Johnson 1-yard run (Sergio Castillo kick), 5:34. Jets 28–24. **Drive: 6 plays, 44 yards, 3:11.**
- LV – Henry Ruggs III 46-yard pass from Derek Carr (Daniel Carlson kick), 0:05. Raiders 31–28. **Drive: 4 plays, 61 yards, 0:30.**

**Top passers**

- LV – Derek Carr – 28/47, 381 yards, 3 TD, INT
- NYJ – Sam Darnold – 14/23, 186 yards, 2 TD, INT

**Top rushers**

- LV – Devontae Booker – 16 rushes, 50 yards
- NYJ – Ty Johnson – 22 rushes, 104 yards, TD

**Top receivers**

- LV – Darren Waller – 13 receptions, 200 yards, 2 TD
- NYJ – Jamison Crowder – 5 receptions, 47 yards, 2 TD

The Jets led much of the early portions of the game, scoring two early touchdowns and holding a 13–7 lead. Despite giving up the next seventeen points and entering the fourth quarter trailing by eleven, the Jets scored twice and reclaimed the lead with 5:34 remaining. On the ensuing Las Vegas drive, the Raiders were stopped on fourth down inside the New York 10-yard line when Derek Carr threw an incompletion on fourth down after offsetting penalties negated a first down.

The Jets forced the Raiders to use their remaining time outs on their possession and punted the ball back to them, leaving the Raiders sixty-one yards from the end zone with thirty-five seconds left. Carr managed to get Las Vegas into New York territory on the first play of the drive, with Darren Waller hauling in a completion to the 46-yard line. After spiking the ball to stop the clock, Carr threw two consecutive incompletions to bring up third down with thirteen seconds showing.

On third down, Jets defensive coordinator Gregg Williams decided to call for a play referred to as a zero blitz, which results in nearly every defender rushing the play and a lone defensive back remaining in coverage. The call backfired on the Jets as receiver Henry Ruggs was able to get past rookie cornerback Lamar Jackson, leaving himself wide open and enabling Carr to easily find him for the go-ahead touchdown with five seconds left. The Raiders won the game 31–28.

With the loss, the Jets fell to 0–12 for the first time in franchise history, becoming the first team to start 0–12 since the 2017 Browns, who failed to win a game that season. After the game Williams drew criticism for his play call from the media, players, and coach Adam Gase and after discussions between Gase and team administrators, Williams was relieved of his duties the following day.

==== Week 14: at Seattle Seahawks ====
Week Fourteen: New York Jets at Seattle Seahawks – Game summary

Quarter	1	2	3	4	Total
Jets	3	0	0	0	**3**
**Seahawks**	7	16	14	3	**40**

at Lumen Field, Seattle, Washington

- Date: December 13
- Game time: 4:05 p.m. EST/1:05 p.m. PST
- Game weather: Cloudy, 43 °F (6 °C)
- Game attendance: 0
- Referee: Scott Novak
- TV announcers (CBS): Greg Gumbel, Rich Gannon and Jay Feely
- Recap, Game Book

Game information

**First quarter**

- NYJ – Sergio Castillo 45-yard field goal, 10:21. Jets 3–0. **Drive: 9 plays, 48 yards, 4:39.**
- SEA – Freddie Swain 19-yard pass from Russell Wilson (Jason Myers kick), 7:16. Seahawks 7–3. **Drive: 6 plays, 75 yards, 3:05.**

**Second quarter**

- SEA – DK Metcalf 5-yard pass from Russell Wilson (Jason Myers kick), 14:56. Seahawks 14–3. **Drive: 8 plays, 70 yards, 2:52.**
- SEA – Jason Myers 41-yard field goal, 12:35. Seahawks 17–3. **Drive: 4 plays, 9 yards, 2:11.**
- SEA – Chris Carson 5-yard run (kick failed), 0:32. Seahawks 23–3. **Drive: 9 plays, 69 yards, 1:56.**

**Third quarter**

- SEA – Will Dissly 10-yard pass from Russell Wilson (Jason Myers kick), 8:33. Seahawks 30–3. **Drive: 11 plays, 75 yards, 6:27.**
- SEA – David Moore 3-yard pass from Russell Wilson (Jason Myers kick), 2:57. Seahawks 37–3. **Drive: 7 plays, 40 yards, 3:56.**

**Fourth quarter**

- SEA – Jason Myers 29-yard field goal, 3:49. Seahawks 40–3. **Drive: 13 plays, 54 yards, 8:06.**

**Top passers**

- NYJ – Sam Darnold – 14/26, 132 yards
- SEA – Russell Wilson – 21/27, 206 yards, 4 TD, INT

**Top rushers**

- NYJ – Josh Adams – 6 rushes, 27 yards
- SEA – Chris Carson – 12 rushes, 76 yards, TD

**Top receivers**

- NYJ – Braxton Berrios – 3 receptions, 49 yards
- SEA – DK Metcalf – 6 receptions, 61 yards, TD

The Jets suffered a blowout loss in their second trip to the West Coast in the season. The game is known for being Seahawks safety Jamal Adams' first game against the Jets since Gang Green traded him in the 2020 offseason. Another ex-Jet, quarterback Geno Smith, came into the game late in the third quarter. The Jets extend their franchise-worst start to 0–13, and the 13 losses in a row also set a franchise record.

==== Week 15: at Los Angeles Rams ====
Week Fifteen: New York Jets at Los Angeles Rams – Game summary

Quarter	1	2	3	4	Total
**Jets**	7	6	10	0	**23**
Rams	0	3	7	10	**20**

at SoFi Stadium, Inglewood, California

- Date: December 20
- Game time: 4:05 p.m. EST/1:05 p.m. PST
- Game weather: Sunny, 77 °F (25 °C)
- Game attendance: 0
- Referee: Tony Corrente
- TV announcers (Fox): Kevin Kugler, Brock Huard and Laura Okmin
- Recap, Game Book

Game information

**First quarter**

- NYJ – Ty Johnson 18-yard pass from Sam Darnold (Sam Ficken kick), 6:25. Jets 7–0. **Drive: 13 plays, 74 yards, 7:12.**

**Second quarter**

- NYJ – Sam Ficken 39-yard field goal, 12:44. Jets 10–0. **Drive: 4 plays, 6 yards, 1:30.**
- NYJ – Sam Ficken 25-yard field goal, 7:37. Jets 13–0. **Drive: 5 plays, 15 yards, 2:09.**
- LAR – Matt Gay 45-yard field goal, 0:00. Jets 13–3. **Drive: 8 plays, 34 yards, 0:57.**

**Third quarter**

- NYJ – Frank Gore 1-yard run (Sam Ficken kick), 8:30. Jets 20–3. **Drive: 11 plays, 72 yards, 6:30.**
- LAR – Robert Woods 15-yard pass from Jared Goff (Matt Gay kick), 6:09. Jets 20–10. **Drive: 5 plays, 75 yards, 2:21.**
- NYJ – Sam Ficken 21-yard field goal, 1:39. Jets 23–10. **Drive: 10 plays, 72 yards, 4:30.**

**Fourth quarter**

- LAR – Tyler Higbee 3-yard pass from Jared Goff (Matt Gay kick), 13:47. Jets 23–17. **Drive: 6 plays, 75 yards, 2:52.**
- LAR – Matt Gay 42-yard field goal, 6:35. Jets 23–20. **Drive: 11 plays, 46 yards, 5:13.**

**Top passers**

- NYJ – Sam Darnold – 22/31, 207 yards, TD
- LAR – Jared Goff – 22/34, 209 yards, 2 TD, INT

**Top rushers**

- NYJ – Frank Gore – 23 rushes, 59 yards, TD
- LAR – Cam Akers – 15 rushes, 63 yards

**Top receivers**

- NYJ – Jamison Crowder – 6 receptions, 66 yards
- LAR – Robert Woods – 6 receptions, 56 yards, TD

The Jets entered the game as 17-point underdogs. They dominated in the first half and never once gave up the lead. After the Rams failed to convert on fourth down, that allowed the Jets to kneel and improve to 1–13. This win also prevented the Jets from joining the 2017 Cleveland Browns and 2008 Detroit Lions among the only teams to finish 0–16. The Jets became only the sixth team in history to win a game after starting 0–13. (Note: The previous five were the 1980 New Orleans Saints (0–14 before first win), the 1986 Indianapolis Colts, the 2007 Miami Dolphins, the 2011 Indianapolis Colts, and the 2016 Cleveland Browns (0–14).)

==== Week 16: vs. Cleveland Browns ====
Week Sixteen: Cleveland Browns at New York Jets – Game summary

Quarter	1	2	3	4	Total
Browns	3	0	7	6	**16**
**Jets**	7	6	7	3	**23**

at MetLife Stadium, East Rutherford, New Jersey

- Date: December 27
- Game time: 1:00 p.m. EST
- Game weather: Sunny and cold, 37 °F (3 °C)
- Game attendance: 0
- Referee: Land Clark
- TV announcers (CBS): Kevin Harlan, Trent Green and AJ Ross
- Recap, Game Book

Game information

**First quarter**

- CLE – Cody Parkey 44-yard field goal, 9:26. Browns 3–0. **Drive: 9 plays, 34 yards, 3:53.**
- NYJ – Braxton Berrios 43-yard pass from Jamison Crowder (Sam Ficken kick), 0:34. Jets 7–3. **Drive: 5 plays, 66 yards, 2:19.**

**Second quarter**

- NYJ – Chris Herndon 11-yard pass from Sam Darnold (kick blocked), 13:33. Jets 13–3. **Drive: 4 plays, 30 yards, 1:21.**

**Third quarter**

- NYJ – Jamison Crowder 30-yard pass from Sam Darnold (Sam Ficken kick), 10:26. Jets 20–3. **Drive: 8 plays, 75 yards, 4:34.**
- CLE – Nick Chubb 1-yard run (Cody Parkey kick), 2:56. Jets 20–10. **Drive: 9 plays, 60 yards, 2:45.**

**Fourth quarter**

- CLE – Kareem Hunt 4-yard run (kick failed), 12:38. Jets 20–16. **Drive: 12 plays, 83 yards, 2:43.**
- NYJ – Sam Ficken 34-yard field goal, 2:52. Jets 23–16. **Drive: 4 plays, 1 yard, 0:22.**

**Top passers**

- CLE – Baker Mayfield – 28/53, 285 yards
- NYJ – Sam Darnold – 16/32, 175 yards, 2 TD

**Top rushers**

- CLE – Nick Chubb – 11 rushes, 28 yards, TD
- NYJ – Frank Gore – 14 rushes, 48 yards

**Top receivers**

- CLE – Austin Hooper – 7 receptions, 71 yards
- NYJ – Jamison Crowder – 7 receptions, 92 yards, TD

The Jets defeated the Browns for the first time since 2017 as they avoided their first one-win season since 1996. With the win, the Jets relinquished the first overall pick in the 2021 NFL draft to Jacksonville, and also prevented two teams finishing 1–15 in the same season for the first time. (Note: There had been two previous near misses of two 1–15 teams in one season. In 2001, the Detroit Lions avoided two 1–15 teams — amazingly both would have had their only win against the Minnesota Vikings — by winning their last game against the Dallas Cowboys. In 2016, after the Cleveland Browns won their only game in the third-last week, the San Francisco 49ers beat the Los Angeles Rams in the penultimate week of the regular season to avert the possibility of two 1–15 teams.)

==== Week 17: at New England Patriots ====
Week Seventeen: New York Jets at New England Patriots – Game summary

Quarter	1	2	3	4	Total
Jets	0	7	7	0	**14**
**Patriots**	7	0	7	14	**28**

at Gillette Stadium, Foxborough, Massachusetts

- Date: January 3, 2021
- Game time: 1:00 p.m. EST
- Game weather: Cloudy, 33 °F (1 °C)
- Game attendance: 0
- Referee: Brad Rogers
- TV announcers (CBS): Tom McCarthy and Jay Feely
- Recap, Game Book

Game information

**First quarter**

- NE – James White 7-yard pass from Cam Newton (Nick Folk kick), 11:26. Patriots 7–0. **Drive: 7 plays, 84 yards, 3:37.**

**Second quarter**

- NYJ – Chris Herndon 21-yard pass from Sam Darnold (Chase McLaughlin kick), 1:40. Tied 7–7. **Drive: 10 plays, 80 yards, 4:07.**

**Third quarter**

- NYJ – Jamal Adams 1-yard run (Chase McLaughlin kick), 11:40. Jets 14–7. **Drive: 6 plays, 75 yards, 3:20.**
- NE – Cam Newton 19-yard pass from Jakobi Meyers (Nick Folk kick), 2:22. Tied 14–14. **Drive: 10 plays, 58 yards, 4:45.**

**Fourth quarter**

- NE – Devin Asiasi 26-yard pass from Cam Newton (Nick Folk kick), 13:56. Patriots 21–14. **Drive: 4 plays, 45 yards, 1:13.**
- NE – Sony Michel 31-yard pass from Cam Newton (Nick Folk kick), 11:42. Patriots 28–14. **Drive: 2 plays, 57 yards, 0:29.**

**Top passers**

- NYJ – Sam Darnold – 23/34, 266 yards, TD, 2 INT
- NE – Cam Newton – 21/30, 242 yards, 3 TD

**Top rushers**

- NYJ – Josh Adams – 11 rushes, 47 yards, TD
- NE – Cam Newton – 11 rushes, 79 yards

**Top receivers**

- NYJ – Breshad Perriman – 3 receptions, 84 yards
- NE – Jakobi Meyers – 6 receptions, 68 yards

With their 10th straight loss against New England the Jets ended their season at 2–14, their worst record since 1996. With the Cleveland Browns and Tampa Bay Buccaneers clinching playoff spots, the Jets now hold the longest active postseason drought in the NFL, dating back to 2010. This would be the last time Sam Darnold would start for the Jets as he would be traded to the Carolina Panthers during the off-season. The Jets were also the only team to lose all six games in their division.

=== Standings ===
==== Division ====
AFC East
	W	L	T	PCT	DIV	CONF	PF	PA	STK
^{(2)} Buffalo Bills	13	3	0	.813	6–0	10–2	501	375	W6
Miami Dolphins	10	6	0	.625	3–3	7–5	404	338	L1
New England Patriots	7	9	0	.438	3–3	6–6	326	353	W1
New York Jets	2	14	0	.125	0–6	1–11	243	457	L1

==== Conference ====
AFC
#	Team	Division	W	L	T	PCT	DIV	CONF	SOS	SOV	STK
**Division leaders**
1	Kansas City Chiefs	West	14	2	0	.875	4–2	10–2	.465	.464	L1
2	Buffalo Bills	East	13	3	0	.813	6–0	10–2	.512	.471	W6
3	Pittsburgh Steelers	North	12	4	0	.750	4–2	9–3	.475	.448	L1
4 (Note: Tennessee finished ahead of Indianapolis in the AFC South based on division record.)	Tennessee Titans	South	11	5	0	.688	5–1	8–4	.475	.398	W1
**Wild cards**
5 (Note: Baltimore claimed the No. 5 seed over Indianapolis based on head-to-head victory. Division tiebreaker used to eliminate Cleveland (see below).) (Note: Baltimore claimed the No. 5 seed over Cleveland based on head-to-head sweep.)	Baltimore Ravens	North	11	5	0	.688	4–2	7–5	.494	.401	W5
6 (Note: Cleveland claimed the No. 6 seed over Indianapolis based on head-to-head victory.)	Cleveland Browns	North	11	5	0	.688	3–3	7–5	.451	.406	W1
7	Indianapolis Colts	South	11	5	0	.688	4–2	7–5	.443	.384	W1
**Did not qualify for the postseason**
8	Miami Dolphins	East	10	6	0	.625	3–3	7–5	.467	.347	L1
9	Las Vegas Raiders	West	8	8	0	.500	4–2	6–6	.539	.477	W1
10 (Note: New England finished ahead of the LA Chargers based on head-to-head victory.)	New England Patriots	East	7	9	0	.438	3–3	6–6	.527	.429	W1
11	Los Angeles Chargers	West	7	9	0	.438	3–3	6–6	.482	.344	W4
12	Denver Broncos	West	5	11	0	.313	1–5	4–8	.566	.388	L3
13	Cincinnati Bengals	North	4	11	1	.281	1–5	4–8	.529	.438	L1
14	Houston Texans	South	4	12	0	.250	2–4	3–9	.541	.219	L5
15	New York Jets	East	2	14	0	.125	0–6	1–11	.594	.656	L1
16	Jacksonville Jaguars	South	1	15	0	.063	1–5	1–11	.549	.688	L15
**Tiebreakers** (Note: When breaking ties for three or more teams under the NFL's rules, they are first broken within divisions, then comparing only the highest ranked remaining team from each division.)
