= Seth Coleman =

American football player (born 2000)

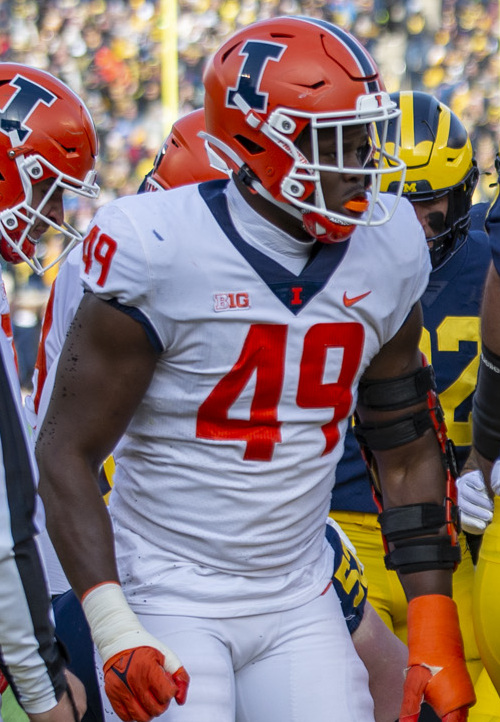
- Coleman in 2022

Profile
- Position: Linebacker

Personal information
- Born: December 7, 2000 (age 25); Melbourne, Florida, U.S.
- Listed height: 6 ft 3 in (1.91 m)
- Listed weight: 246 lb (112 kg)

Career information
- High school: Holy Trinity Episcopal Academy (Melbourne, Florida)
- College: Illinois (2019–2024)
- NFL draft: 2025: undrafted

Career history
- Seattle Seahawks (2025)*; Indianapolis Colts (2025)*; Miami Dolphins (2026)*
- * Offseason or practice squad member only
- Stats at Pro Football Reference

Seth Coleman (born December 7, 2000) is an American professional football linebacker. He played college football for the Illinois Fighting Illini.

== Early life ==
Coleman attended high school at Holy Trinity Episcopal Academy. He was rated as a three-star recruit and committed to play college football for the Illinois Fighting Illini.

== College career ==
As a freshman in 2020, Coleman recorded 13 tackles with three and a half going for a loss. In week 3 of the 2021 season, he notched six tackles, with one being for a loss, a forced fumble, a fumble recovery, and a pass deflection. In the 2021 season, Coleman played in 10 games where he recorded 22 tackles with three going for a loss, two sacks, two pass deflections, a forced fumble, and a fumble recovery. Ahead of the 2022 season, he earned a starting outside linebacker role. In week 6 of the 2022 season, Coleman logged five tackles with two being for a loss, two sacks, and a pass deflection in a win over Iowa. In week 9, he forced an errant throw as he hit quarterback Casey Washington which resulted in a game-changing interception, as the Illini went on to win. Coleman finished the 2022 season with 45 tackles with five being for a loss, four and a half sacks, ten quarterback hurries, and six pass deflections, earning honorable mention all-Big Ten Conference selection.

In 2023, Coleman totaled 50 tackles with nine being for a loss, along with six sacks and again earned a Big Ten honorable mention. He decided to return to the Fighting Illini for his sixth season in 2024.

== Professional career ==
Pre-draft measurables
Height	Weight	Arm length	Hand span	Wingspan	40-yard dash	10-yard split	20-yard split	20-yard shuttle	Three-cone drill	Vertical jump	Broad jump	Bench press
6 ft 3 1/2 in (1.92 m)	246 lb (112 kg)	34 in (0.86 m)	9 7/8 in (0.25 m)	6 ft 10 1/4 in (2.09 m)	4.68 s	1.62 s	2.75 s	4.59 s	7.56 s	36.5 in (0.93 m)	10 ft 3 in (3.12 m)	20 reps
All values from Pro Day

=== Seattle Seahawks ===
Coleman signed with the Seattle Seahawks as an undrafted free agent on May 2, 2025. He was waived on August 26 as part of final roster cuts.

=== Indianapolis Colts ===
On October 21, 2025, the Indianapolis Colts signed Coleman to the team's practice squad. He was released by Indianapolis on October 27.

=== Houston Gamblers ===
On January 13, 2026, Coleman was selected by the Houston Gamblers in the 2026 UFL Draft.

=== Miami Dolphins ===
On January 21, 2026, Coleman signed a reserve/futures contract with the Miami Dolphins. He was waived by the Dolphins on August 29.
