= Bryce Huff =

American football player (born 1998)

No. 47, 0
- Position: Defensive end

Personal information
- Born: April 17, 1998 (age 28); Mobile, Alabama, U.S.
- Listed height: 6 ft 3 in (1.91 m)
- Listed weight: 255 lb (116 kg)

Career information
- High school: St. Paul's Episcopal (Mobile)
- College: Memphis (2016–2019)
- NFL draft: 2020: undrafted

Career history
- New York Jets (2020–2023); Philadelphia Eagles (2024); San Francisco 49ers (2025)

Awards and highlights
- Super Bowl champion (LIX); 2× second-team All-AAC (2018, 2019)

Career NFL statistics
- Total tackles: 108
- Sacks: 24
- Forced fumbles: 4
- Pass deflections: 4
- Stats at Pro Football Reference

Bryce Huff (born April 17, 1998) is an American former professional football player who was a defensive end for six seasons in the National Football League (NFL). He played college football for the Memphis Tigers and signed with the New York Jets as an undrafted free agent in 2020. Huff also played for the Philadelphia Eagles and San Francisco 49ers.

== Early life ==
Huff was born in Mobile, Alabama, and played high school football at St. Paul's Episcopal School. As a senior, he was named first-team All-State after recording 93 tackles and seven sacks. A two-star linebacker recruit, Huff initially committed to play college football at South Alabama, but flipped his commitment to Memphis, over offers from Arkansas State, Georgia Southern, and Troy.

== College career ==
Huff played mostly on special teams as a true freshman. He entered the pass rush rotation as a sophomore, making three starts and finishing the season with 30 tackles, five tackles for loss and two sacks. As a junior, Huff recorded 49 tackles and led the team with 9.5 sacks and 19 tackles for loss and was named second-team All-American Athletic Conference (AAC). He again led the Tigers with 6.5 sacks and 15.5 tackles for a loss and was named second-team All-AAC.

== Professional career ==
Pre-draft measurables
Height	Weight	Arm length	Hand span	Wingspan
6 ft 1 5/8 in (1.87 m)	254 lb (115 kg)	31 3/4 in (0.81 m)	9 1/2 in (0.24 m)	6 ft 3 3/4 in (1.92 m)
All values from Pro Day

=== New York Jets ===
Huff signed with the New York Jets as an undrafted free agent on May 6, 2020, shortly after the conclusion of the 2020 NFL draft. He was announced as part of the Jets' initial 53-man roster on September 5. Huff made his NFL debut on September 27, against the Indianapolis Colts, batting down a pass in a 36–17 loss. Two weeks later against the Miami Dolphins, Huff recorded his first career sack on Ryan Fitzpatrick during the 24–0 loss.

Huff entered the 2021 season as a starting linebacker for the Jets. He started the first six games before being placed on injured reserve on November 4, 2021, with a back injury. Huff was activated on December 18.

Huff entered the 2023 offseason as a restricted free agent, and the Jets placed a second-round tender on him on March 15, 2023.

=== Philadelphia Eagles ===
On March 13, 2024, Huff signed a three-year contract with the Philadelphia Eagles. He missed five weeks due to a torn ligament in his groin area, and was activated from injured reserve on December 28. Huff was inactive for the Super Bowl but won the title when the Eagles defeated the Kansas City Chiefs 40–22 in Super Bowl LIX.

=== San Francisco 49ers ===
On June 2, 2025, Huff was traded to the San Francisco 49ers for a conditional 2026 fifth-round pick (No. 166: the Chicago Bears selected Keyshaun Elliott).

On March 12, 2026, Huff announced his retirement from professional football.

== NFL career statistics ==
Legend
	Won the Super Bowl
**Bold**	Career high

=== Regular season ===
Year	Team	Games		Tackles					Fumbles			Interceptions					
Year	Team	GP	GS	Comb	Solo	Ast	Sack	TFL	FF	FR	Yds	Int	Yds	Avg	Lng	TD	PD
2020	NYJ	14	0	16	12	4	2.0	4	—	—	—	—	—	—	—	—	**1**
2021	NYJ	9	7	14	5	9	2.0	1	—	—	—	—	—	—	—	—	—
2022	NYJ	14	0	6	4	2	3.5	2	1	—	—	—	—	—	—	—	**1**
2023	NYJ	**17**	0	29	**19**	10	**10.0**	**10**	—	—	—	—	—	—	—	—	**1**
2024	PHI	12	6	13	5	8	2.5	3	1	—	—	—	—	—	—	—	—
2025	SF	15	**8**	**30**	14	**16**	4.0	6	**2**	—	—	—	—	—	—	—	**1**
Career		81	21	108	59	49	24.0	26	4	—	—	—	—	—	—	—	4

=== Postseason ===
Year	Team	Games		Tackles					Fumbles			Interceptions					
Year	Team	GP	GS	Comb	Solo	Ast	Sack	TFL	FF	FR	Yds	Int	Yds	Avg	Lng	TD	PD
2024	PHI	**2**	0	—	—	—	—	—	—	—	—	—	—	—	—	—	—
2025	SF	**2**	**2**	**4**	**2**	**2**	—	**2**	—	—	—	—	—	—	—	—	—
Career		4	2	4	2	2	—	2	—	—	—	—	—	—	—	—	—
