= Neville Hewitt (American football) =

American football player (born 1993)

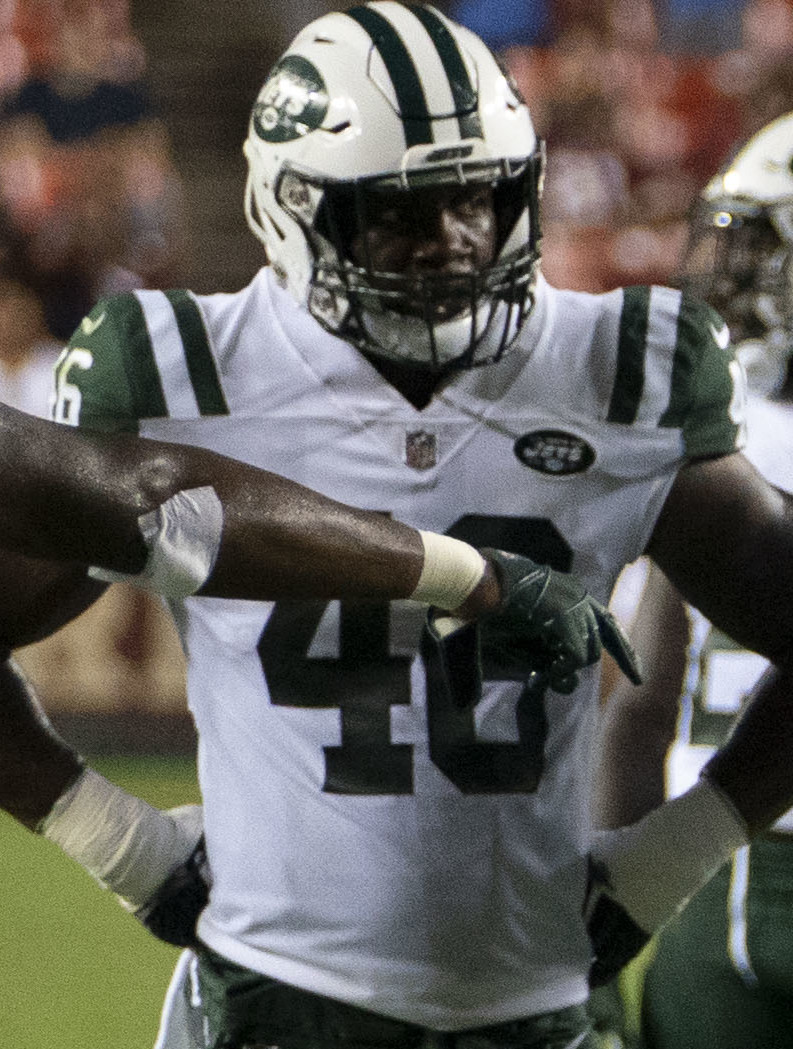
- Hewitt with the New York Jets in 2018

Profile
- Position: Linebacker

Personal information
- Born: April 6, 1993 (age 33); Silver Spring, Maryland, U.S.
- Listed height: 6 ft 2 in (1.88 m)
- Listed weight: 235 lb (107 kg)

Career information
- High school: Rockdale County (Conyers, Georgia)
- College: Georgia Military (2011–2012); Marshall (2013–2014)
- NFL draft: 2015: undrafted

Career history
- Miami Dolphins (2015–2017); New York Jets (2018–2020); Houston Texans (2021–2024); New York Giants (2025)

Awards and highlights
- C-USA Defensive Player of the Year (2014)

Career NFL statistics as of Week 16, 2025
- Total tackles: 511
- Sacks: 7.5
- Forced fumbles: 4
- Fumble recoveries: 2
- Interceptions: 4
- Pass deflections: 16
- Stats at Pro Football Reference

Neville Hewitt (born April 6, 1993) is an American professional football linebacker. He played college football for the Marshall Thundering Herd, where he was a safety and linebacker. Hewitt signed with the Miami Dolphins as an undrafted free agent in 2015.

== College career ==
Hewitt spent the first 2 years of his college football career at the junior college level, playing for Georgia Military College. In 2012, he recorded 65 tackles, five tackles for loss and five pass breakups for Georgia Military.

He then transferred to Marshall where he spent 2 years playing for the Herd. While at Marshall, he posted 208 tackles, including 16.5 for loss and 7.5 sacks, with two interceptions, four pass breakups, two fumble recoveries and one forced fumble. He was named Conference USA Defensive Player of the Year in 2014.

== Professional career ==
Pre-draft measurables
Height	Weight	Arm length	Hand span	40-yard dash	10-yard split	20-yard split	20-yard shuttle	Three-cone drill	Vertical jump	Broad jump
6 ft 1 3/8 in (1.86 m)	231 lb (105 kg)	31 5/8 in (0.80 m)	9 in (0.23 m)	4.69 s	1.65 s	2.68 s	4.65 s	7.14 s	37.0 in (0.94 m)	9 ft 11 in (3.02 m)
All values from Pro Day

=== Miami Dolphins ===
On May 2, 2015, Hewitt signed with the Miami Dolphins as an undrafted free agent following the conclusion of the 2015 NFL draft. He made his NFL debut on September 13 against the Washington Redskins. On November 22, he made first career start against the Dallas Cowboys and posted his first career interception. On January 3, 2016, Hewitt made a season-high six tackles and one pass breakup against the New England Patriots. He finished his rookie season with 39 tackles and an interception.

On December 4, Hewitt recorded his first career fumble recovery against the Baltimore Ravens. On December 17, he made his first career sack against the New York Jets. A week later, Hewitt recorded a career-high nine tackles against the Buffalo Bills. He made five tackles in the AFC wild card game against the Pittsburgh Steelers.

On September 2, 2017, Hewitt was waived by the Dolphins. On October 9, he was re-signed to the Dolphins' practice squad. He was promoted to the active roster on November 22.

=== New York Jets ===
On March 28, 2018, Hewitt signed a one-year contract with the Jets. He played in 16 games with four starts, recording 39 combined tackles and 1.5 sacks.

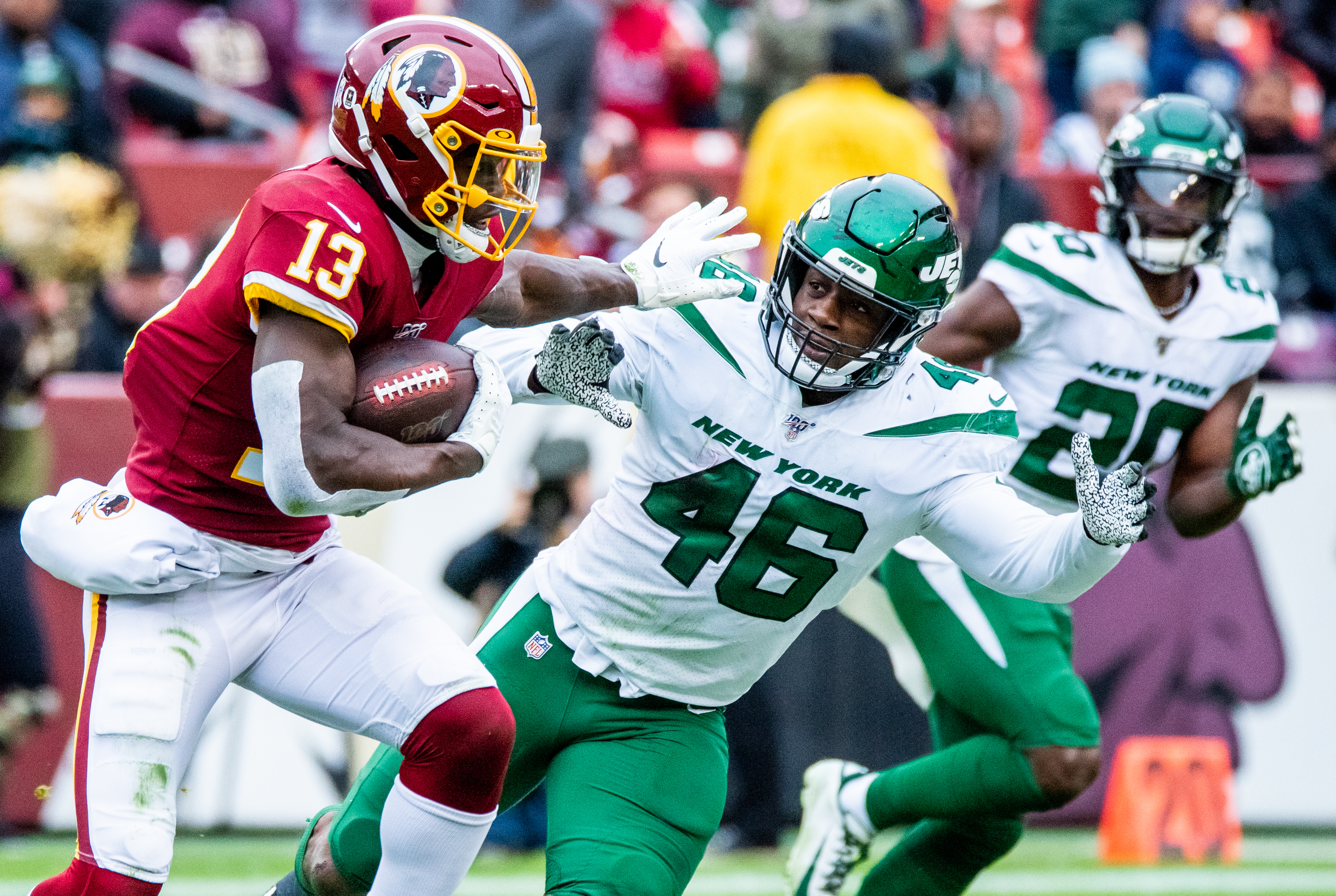
Hewitt (46) in a game against the Washington Redskins in 2019

On March 13, 2019, Hewitt re-signed with the Jets. In Week 1 against the Bills, Hewitt intercepted Josh Allen once as the Jets lost 17–16. In Week 2 against the Cleveland Browns. Hewitt recorded 8 tackles and sacked Baker Mayfield once in the 23–3 loss. In Week 11 against the Redskins, Hewitt intercepted a pass thrown by quarterback Dwayne Haskins in the 34–17 win.

On March 25, 2020, Hewitt re-signed for a third season with the Jets. He started all 16 games, leading the team with a career-high 134 tackles, along with 2.0 sacks, four passes defensed, and one interception.

=== Houston Texans ===
Hewitt signed with the Houston Texans on May 7, 2021. He played in all 17 games with five starts, recording 60 tackles.

On March 30, 2022, Hewitt re-signed with the Texans, playing almost exclusively on special teams that season. He re-signed to play a third season with the Texans on May 8, 2023, again only on special teams.

Hewitt re-signed with the Texans on April 1, 2024.

=== New York Giants ===
On September 16, 2025, Hewitt signed with the New York Giants practice squad. He was signed to the active roster on October 9.

== NFL career statistics ==
Legend
**Bold**	Career high

=== Regular season ===
Year	Team	Games		Tackles					Interceptions					Fumbles			
Year	Team	GP	GS	Cmb	Solo	Ast	Sck	TFL	Int	Yds	TD	Lng	PD	FF	FR	Yds	TD
2015	MIA	16	2	39	27	12	0.0	3	1	0	0	0	3	0	0	0	0
2016	MIA	16	5	64	40	24	1.0	4	0	0	0	0	1	0	**1**	0	0
2017	MIA	6	0	1	1	0	0.0	0	0	0	0	0	0	0	0	0	0
2018	NYJ	16	4	39	26	13	1.5	1	0	0	0	0	0	0	0	0	0
2019	NYJ	12	12	75	44	31	**3.0**	**6**	**2**	13	0	9	**5**	0	0	0	0
2020	NYJ	16	16	**134**	**91**	**43**	2.0	**6**	0	0	0	0	4	1	**1**	**17**	0
2021	HOU	17	5	60	37	23	0.0	1	0	0	0	0	0	0	0	0	0
2022	HOU	14	0	14	10	4	0.0	1	0	0	0	0	0	1	0	0	0
2023	HOU	16	0	14	8	6	0.0	0	0	0	0	0	0	0	0	0	0
2024	HOU	17	4	59	31	28	0.0	0	1	**45**	0	**45**	3	**2**	0	0	0
2025	NYG	14	0	12	5	7	0.0	0	0	0	0	0	0	0	0	0	0
		160	48	511	320	191	7.5	22	4	58	0	45	16	4	2	17	0

=== Playoffs ===
Year	Team	Games		Tackles					Interceptions					Fumbles			
Year	Team	GP	GS	Cmb	Solo	Ast	Sck	TFL	Int	Yds	TD	Lng	PD	FF	FR	Yds	TD
2016	MIA	1	0	**5**	**3**	**2**	0.0	0	0	0	0	0	0	0	0	0	0
2023	HOU	2	0	1	0	1	0.0	0	0	0	0	0	0	0	0	0	0
2024	HOU	2	0	4	2	2	0.0	0	0	0	0	0	0	0	0	0	0
		5	0	10	5	5	0.0	0	0	0	0	0	0	0	0	0	0
