= 2019 Atlantic Coast Conference football season =

2019 ACC Football season
- League: NCAA Division I Football Bowl Subdivision
- Sport: Football
- Duration: August 29, 2019, to January 13, 2020
- Teams: 14

2020 NFL Draft
- Top draft pick: Isaiah Simmons – (Clemson)
- Picked by: Arizona Cardinals, 8th Overall

Regular season
- Atlantic champions: Clemson
- Atlantic runners-up: Louisville
- Coastal champions: Virginia
- Coastal runners-up: Virginia Tech

ACC Championship Game
- Champions: Clemson
- Runners-up: Virginia
- Finals MVP: Tee Higgins, WR - Clemson

Seasons
- ← 2018 2020 →

2019 Atlantic Coast Conference football standings
	Conf.			Overall
Team	W		L	W		L
Atlantic Division
No. 2 Clemson xy$^	8	–	0	14	–	1
Louisville	5	–	3	8	–	5
Wake Forest	4	–	4	8	–	5
Boston College	4	–	4	6	–	7
Florida State	4	–	4	6	–	7
Syracuse	2	–	6	5	–	7
NC State	1	–	7	4	–	8
Coastal Division
Virginia x	6	–	2	9	–	5
Virginia Tech	5	–	3	8	–	5
Pittsburgh	4	–	4	8	–	5
North Carolina	4	–	4	7	–	6
Miami (FL)	4	–	4	6	–	7
Duke	3	–	5	5	–	7
Georgia Tech	2	–	6	3	–	9
Championship: Clemson 62, Virginia 17
^ – College Football Playoff participant; $ – Conference champion; x – Division champion/co-champions; Rankings from AP Poll

The 2019 Atlantic Coast Conference football season, part of the 2019 NCAA Division I FBS football season, is the 67th season of college football play for the Atlantic Coast Conference (ACC). It began on August 29, 2019, and ended on January 13, 2020. The ACC consists of 14 members in two divisions.

The entire 2019 schedule was released on January 16, 2019. The new cable/satellite television channel ACC Network debuted this season, and broadcast 40 regular season games.

== Preseason ==
=== ACC Kickoff ===
The 2019 ACC Kickoff was held on July 17 & 18 at the Westin Hotel in Charlotte, North Carolina. On July 2, 2019, the ACC announced that 28 athletes from the 14 ACC teams would be available for press questions at the Kickoff event.

The Preseason Poll was released on July 22, 2019, after the Kickoff Event. Clemson was elected an overwhelming favorite to repeat as ACC Champions, receiving 170 of 173 Championship votes.

Atlantic
Predicted finish	Team	Votes (1st place)
1	Clemson	1,209 (171)
2	Syracuse	913 (2)
3	Florida State	753
4	NC State	666
5	Boston College	588
6	Wake Forest	462
7	Louisville	253

Coastal
Predicted finish	Team	Votes (1st place)
1	Virginia	1,003 (82)
2	Miami	992 (55)
3	Virginia Tech	827 (20)
4	Pittsburgh	691 (8)
5	Duke	566 (6)
6	North Carolina	463 (1)
7	Georgia Tech	302 (1)

Media poll (ACC Championship)
Rank	Team	Votes
1	Clemson	170
2	Syracuse	2
3	Virginia	1

==== Preseason ACC Player of the Year ====
1 Trevor Lawrence, QB, Clemson – 127
2 Travis Etienne, RB, Clemson – 24
3 A. J. Dillon, RB, Boston College – 15
4 Bryce Perkins, QB, Virginia – 6
5 Cam Akers, RB, Florida State – 1

==== Preseason All-Conference Teams ====
===== Offense =====
Position	Player	School	Votes
Wide receiver	Tee Higgins	Clemson	145
Wide receiver	Justyn Ross	Clemson	123
Wide receiver	Tamorrion Terry	Florida State	69
Tight end	Brevin Jordan	Miami	66
Advanced Playmaker	Deon Jackson	Duke	47
Tackle	Tremayne Anchrum	Clemson	100
Tackle	Ben Petrula	Boston College	54
Guard	John Simpson	Clemson	136
Guard	Gage Cervenka	Clemson	45
Center	Sean Pollard	Clemson	75
Quarterback	Trevor Lawrence	Clemson	161
Running back	Travis Etienne	Clemson	144
Running back	A. J. Dillon	Boston College	144

===== Defense =====
Position	Player	School	Votes
Defensive end	Xavier Thomas	Clemson	84
Defensive end	Alton Robinson	Syracuse	83
Defensive tackle	Marvin Wilson	Florida State	105
Defensive tackle	Nyles Pinckney	Clemson	49
Linebacker	Shaquille Quarterman	Miami	118
Linebacker	Isaiah Simmons	Clemson	109
Linebacker	Michael Pinckney	Miami	66
Cornerback	Bryce Hall	Virginia	122
Cornerback	A. J. Terrell	Clemson	62
Safety	Andre Cisco	Syracuse	80
Safety	Tanner Muse	Clemson	78

===== Specialist =====
Position	Player	School	Votes
Placekicker	Andre Szmyt	Syracuse	88
Punter	Sterling Hofrichter	Syracuse	70
Specialist	Maurice Ffrench	Pittsburgh	48

=== Recruiting classes ===
Rankings
Team	ESPN	Rivals	24/7	Signees
Boston College	56	60	61	19
Clemson	10	9	10	28
Duke	42	48	47	21
Florida State	22	18	18	22
Georgia Tech	61	43	52	20
Louisville	68	89	72	14
Miami	30	35	28	17
North Carolina	35	31	32	19
NC State	31	31	29	24
Pittsburgh	49	50	55	19
Syracuse	58	54	53	20
Virginia	40	39	39	23
Virginia Tech	27	25	26	23
Wake Forest	54	59	54	21

== Coaches ==
=== Coaching changes ===
In 2019 the ACC Conference will have 4 new head coaches for the 2019 season.

- On November 11, 2018, Louisville head coach Bobby Petrino was fired after starting the season 2–8. The interim coach, Lorenzo Ward, was not retained and Scott Satterfield was announced as the new head coach on December 2, 2018.
- On November 25, 2018, North Carolina head coach Larry Fedora was fired and replaced by returning coach Mack Brown.
- On November 28, 2018, Georgia Tech head coach Paul Johnson announced his retirement from coaching effective after Georgia Tech's bowl game. On December 7 it was announced Temple head coach Geoff Collins, a former grad assistant and recruiting coordinator for Georgia Tech, would be the new head coach.
- On December 30, 2018, Miami Hurricanes head coach Mark Richt announced his retirement from coaching and was replaced by Manny Diaz. Diaz was previously the defensive coordinator at Miami and had been hired on December 13, 2018, to be the head coach at Temple.

=== Head coaching records ===
Team	Head coach	Years at school	Overall record	Record at school	ACC record
Boston College	Steve Addazio	7	51–49	38–38	18–30
Clemson	Dabo Swinney	12	116–30	116–30	69–16
Duke	David Cutcliffe	12	111–101	67–72	31–57
Florida State	Willie Taggart	2	52–57	5–7	3–5
Georgia Tech	Geoff Collins	1	15–10	0–0	0–0
Louisville	Scott Satterfield	1	51–24	0–0	0–0
Miami	Manny Diaz	1	0–0	0–0	0–0
North Carolina	Mack Brown	11	244–122–1	69–46–1	40–35–1
North Carolina State	Dave Doeren	7	66–38	43–34	20–28
Pittsburgh	Pat Narduzzi	5	28–24	28–24	20–12
Syracuse	Dino Babers	4	55–35	18–19	10–14
Virginia	Bronco Mendenhall	4	115–65	16–22	8–16
Virginia Tech	Justin Fuente	4	51–38	25–15	15–9
Wake Forest	Dave Clawson	6	118–115	28–35	12–28

Notes

- Records shown are prior to the 2019 season
- Years at school includes the 2019 season

== Rankings ==
Legend
	Improvement in ranking
	Drop in ranking
	Not ranked previous week
RV	Received votes but were not ranked in Top 25 of poll

		Pre	Wk 1	Wk 2	Wk 3	Wk 4	Wk 5	Wk 6	Wk 7	Wk 8	Wk 9	Wk 10	Wk 11	Wk 12	Wk 13	Wk 14	Wk 15	Final
Boston College	AP		RV	RV														
Boston College	C	RV	RV	RV														
Boston College	CFP	Not released																
Clemson	AP	1 (52)	1 (54)	1 (56)	1 (57)	1 (55)	2 (18)	2 (15)	3 (11)	4 (9)	4 (7)	4 (7)	3 (3)	3 (3)	3 (3)	3 (3)	3 (3)	2
Clemson	C	1 (59)	1 (58)	1 (60)	1 (62)	1 (62)	2 (30)	2 (20)	2 (14)	2 (10)	3 (10)	3 (9)	3 (4)	3 (4)	3 (4)	3 (4)	3 (5)	2
Clemson	CFP	Not released										5	3	3	3	3	3	
Duke	AP																	
Duke	C	RV		RV	RV	RV	RV		RV									
Duke	CFP	Not released																
Florida State	AP																	
Florida State	C	RV																
Florida State	CFP	Not released																
Georgia Tech	AP																	
Georgia Tech	C																	
Georgia Tech	CFP	Not released																
Louisville	AP																	
Louisville	C																	
Louisville	CFP	Not released																
Miami	AP	RV	RV															
Miami	C	RV	RV															
Miami	CFP	Not released																
North Carolina	AP		RV	RV														
North Carolina	C		RV	RV														
North Carolina	CFP	Not released																
NC State	AP																	
NC State	C	RV	RV	RV														
NC State	CFP	Not released																
Pittsburgh	AP					RV		RV		RV		RV	RV	RV				
Pittsburgh	C								RV	RV		RV		RV				
Pittsburgh	CFP	Not released																
Syracuse	AP	22	21	RV														
Syracuse	C	22	22															
Syracuse	CFP	Not released																
Virginia	AP	RV	RV	25	21	18	23	20	RV	RV		RV	RV	RV	RV	22	RV	RV
Virginia	C	RV	RV	RV	22	18	22	19	RV	RV	RV	RV	RV	RV	RV	22	25	25
Virginia	CFP	Not released														23	24	
Virginia Tech	AP	RV											RV	25	23	RV		
Virginia Tech	C	RV								RV	RV		RV	RV	23	RV	RV	
Virginia Tech	CFP	Not released													24			
Wake Forest	AP				RV	RV	22	19	RV	25	23	22	RV					
Wake Forest	C			RV	RV	24	20	17	RV	23	22	20	RV	RV	RV			
Wake Forest	CFP	Not released										19						

== Schedule ==
The regular season will begin on August 24 and will end on November 30. The ACC Championship game is scheduled for December 7, 2019.

=== Regular season ===
==== Week zero ====
Date	Time	Visiting team	Home team	Site	TV	Result	Attendance	Ref.
August 24	7:00 p.m.	No. 8 Florida	Miami	Camping World Stadium • Orlando, FL (Camping World Kickoff/Florida Cup/rivalry)	ESPN	L 20–24	66,543	
^{#}Rankings from AP Poll released prior to game. All times are in Eastern Time.

==== Week one ====
Date	Time	Visiting team	Home team	Site	TV	Result	Attendance	Ref.
August 29	8:00 p.m.	Georgia Tech	No. 1 Clemson	Memorial Stadium • Clemson, SC (rivalry)	ACCN	CLEM 52–14	79,118	
August 30	8:00 p.m.	Utah State	Wake Forest	BB&T Field • Winston-Salem, NC	ACCN	W 38–35	29,027	
August 31	Noon	East Carolina	NC State	Carter–Finley Stadium • Raleigh, NC (Victory Barrel)	ACCN	W 34–6	57,633	
August 31	Noon	Boise State	Florida State	Doak Campbell Stadium • Tallahassee, FL	ESPNews	L 31–36	50,917	
August 31	3:30 p.m.	South Carolina	North Carolina	Bank of America Stadium • Charlotte, NC (Belk Kickoff Game/rivalry)	ESPN	W 24–20	52,183	
August 31	3:30 p.m.	No. 2 Alabama	Duke	Mercedes-Benz Stadium • Atlanta, GA (Chick-fil-A Kickoff)	ABC	L 3–42	71,916	
August 31	4:00 p.m.	Virginia Tech	Boston College	Alumni Stadium • Chestnut Hill, MA (rivalry)	ACCN	BC 35–28	35,213	
August 31	6:00 p.m.	No. 22 Syracuse	Liberty	Williams Stadium • Lynchburg, VA	ESPN+	W 24–0	21,671	
August 31	7:30 p.m.	Virginia	Pittsburgh	Heinz Field • Pittsburgh, PA	ACCN	UVA 30–14	47,144	
September 2	8:00 p.m.	No. 9 Notre Dame	Louisville	Cardinal Stadium • Louisville, KY	ESPN	L 17–35	58,187	
^{#}Rankings from AP Poll released prior to game. All times are in Eastern Time.

Date	Bye Week
August 31	Miami

==== Week two ====
Date	Time	Visiting team	Home team	Site	TV	Result	Attendance	Ref.
September 6	8:00 p.m.	William & Mary	Virginia	Scott Stadium • Charlottesville, VA	ACCN	W 52–17	45,250	
September 6	8:00 p.m.	Wake Forest	Rice	Rice Stadium • Houston, TX	CBSSN	W 41–21	17,567	
September 7	11:00 a.m.	Ohio	Pittsburgh	Heinz Field • Pittsburgh, PA	ACCN	W 20–10	42,168	
September 7	Noon	Old Dominion	Virginia Tech	Lane Stadium • Blacksburg, VA	ESPNU	W 31–17	57,282	
September 7	Noon	No. 21 Syracuse	Maryland	Maryland Stadium • College Park, MD	ESPN	L 20–63	33,493	
September 7	12:30 p.m.	Western Carolina	NC State	Carter–Finley Stadium • Raleigh, NC	RSN	W 41–0	55,681	
September 7	2:00 p.m.	South Florida	Georgia Tech	Bobby Dodd Stadium • Atlanta, GA	ACCN	W 14–10	46,599	
September 7	3:30 p.m.	Richmond	Boston College	Alumni Stadium • Chestnut Hill, MA	ACCN Extra	W 45–13	30,111	
September 7	3:30 p.m.	No. 12 Texas A&M	No. 1 Clemson	Memorial Stadium • Clemson, SC	ABC	W 24–10	81,500	
September 7	5:00 p.m.	Louisiana–Monroe	Florida State	Doak Campbell Stadium • Tallahassee, FL	ACCN	W 45–44 ^{OT}	52,969	
September 7	6:00 p.m.	North Carolina A&T	Duke	Wallace Wade Stadium • Durham, NC	ACCN Extra	W 45–13	38,313	
September 7	7:00 p.m.	Eastern Kentucky	Louisville	Cardinal Stadium • Louisville, KY	ACCN Extra	W 42–0	48,808	
September 7	8:00 p.m.	Miami	North Carolina	Kenan Memorial Stadium • Chapel Hill, NC	ACCN	UNC 28–25	50,500	
^{#}Rankings from AP Poll released prior to game. All times are in Eastern Time.

==== Week three ====
Date	Time	Visiting team	Home team	Site	TV	Result	Attendance	Ref.
September 13	6:00 p.m.	North Carolina	Wake Forest	BB&T Field • Winston-Salem, NC (rivalry, Non-Conference*^{[note 1]})	ESPN	WAKE 24–18	31,345	
September 13	7:30 p.m.	Kansas	Boston College	Alumni Stadium • Chestnut Hill, MA	ACCN	L 24–48	32,848	
September 14	Noon	Furman	Virginia Tech	Lane Stadium • Blacksburg, VA	ACCN	W 24–17	52,314	
September 14	Noon	NC State	West Virginia	Mountaineer Field • Morgantown, WV	FS1	L 27–44	57,052	
September 14	Noon	Pittsburgh	No. 13 Penn State	Beaver Stadium • University Park, PA (rivalry)	ABC	L 10–17	108,661	
September 14	12:30 p.m.	The Citadel	Georgia Tech	Bobby Dodd Stadium • Atlanta, GA	RSN	L 24–27 ^{OT}	42,871	
September 14	4:00 p.m.	Bethune–Cookman	Miami	Hard Rock Stadium • Miami Gardens, FL	ACCN	W 63–0	52,036	
September 14	4:00 p.m.	Louisville	Western Kentucky	Nissan Stadium • Nashville, TN	Stadium	W 38–21	22,665	
September 14	7:00 p.m.	Duke	Middle Tennessee	Johnny "Red" Floyd Stadium • Murfreesboro, TN	Facebook Live	W 41–18	19,852	
September 14	7:30 p.m.	Florida State	No. 25 Virginia	Scott Stadium • Charlottesville, VA	ACCN	UVA 31–24	57,826	
September 14	7:30 p.m.	No. 1 Clemson	Syracuse †	Carrier Dome • Syracuse, NY	ABC	CLEM 41–6	50,248	
^{#}Rankings from AP Poll released prior to game. All times are in Eastern Time.

^note 1The game between North Carolina and Wake Forest is being played as a non-conference game and will therefore not count in the conference standings. This was done because the two rivals otherwise only play once every six years due to conference divisional alignment.

==== Week four ====
Date	Time	Visiting team	Home team	Site	TV	Result	Attendance	Ref.
September 21	Noon	Boston College	Rutgers	HighPoint.com Stadium • Piscataway, NJ	BTN	W 30–16	32,217	
September 21	Noon	Western Michigan	Syracuse	Carrier Dome • Syracuse, NY	ACCN	W 52–33	40,700	
September 21	Noon	Elon	Wake Forest †	BB&T Field • Winston-Salem, NC	RSN	W 49–7	24,079	
September 21	3:30 p.m.	Louisville	Florida State	Doak Campbell Stadium • Tallahassee, FL	ESPN	FSU 35–24	46,350	
September 21	3:30 p.m.	No. 15 UCF	Pittsburgh	Heinz Field • Pittsburgh, PA	ABC/ESPN2	W 35–34	42,056	
September 21	3:30 p.m.	Appalachian State	North Carolina	Kenan Memorial Stadium • Chapel Hill, NC	RSN	L 31–34	50,500	
September 21	4:00 p.m.	Central Michigan	Miami	Hard Rock Stadium • Miami Gardens, FL	ACCN	W 17–12	49,997	
September 21	7:00 p.m.	Old Dominion	No. 21 Virginia	Scott Stadium • Charlottesville, VA	ESPN2	W 28–17	44,573	
September 21	7:00 p.m.	Ball State	NC State	Carter–Finley Stadium • Raleigh, NC	ESPNU	W 34–23	57,702	
September 21	7:30 p.m.	Charlotte	No. 1 Clemson	Memorial Stadium • Clemson, SC	ACCN	W 52–10	81,500	
^{#}Rankings from AP Poll released prior to game. All times are in Eastern Time.

Date	Bye Week		
September 21	Duke	Georgia Tech	Virginia Tech

==== Week five ====
Date	Time	Visiting team	Home team	Site	TV	Result	Attendance	Ref.
September 27	7:00 p.m.	Duke	Virginia Tech	Lane Stadium • Blacksburg, VA	ESPN	DUKE 45–10	59,537	
September 28	Noon	Holy Cross	Syracuse	Carrier Dome • Syracuse, NY	ACCN	W 41–3	40,575	
September 28	12:30 p.m.	Delaware	Pittsburgh	Heinz Field • Pittsburgh, PA	RSN	W 17–14	44,141	
September 28	3:30 p.m.	No. 18 Virginia	No. 10 Notre Dame	Notre Dame Stadium • Notre Dame, IN	NBC	L 20–35	77,622	
September 28	3:30 p.m.	Wake Forest	Boston College	Alumni Stadium • Chestnut Hill, MA	ACCN	WAKE 27–24	39,352	
September 28	3:30 p.m.	No. 1 Clemson	North Carolina	Kenan Memorial Stadium • Chapel Hill, NC	ABC	CLEM 21–20	50,500	
September 28	3:30 p.m.	Georgia Tech	Temple	Lincoln Financial Field • Philadelphia, PA	CBSSN	L 2–24	31,094	
September 28	7:30 p.m.	NC State	Florida State	Doak Campbell Stadium • Tallahassee, FL	ACCN	FSU 31–13	60,351	
^{#}Rankings from AP Poll released prior to game. All times are in Eastern Time.

Date	Bye Week	
September 28	Louisville	Miami

==== Week six ====
Date	Time	Visiting team	Home team	Site	TV	Result	Attendance	Ref.
October 5	12:30 p.m.	Boston College	Louisville	Cardinal Stadium • Louisville, KY	RSN	LOU 41–39	46,007	
October 5	3:30 p.m.	Virginia Tech	Miami	Hard Rock Stadium • Miami Gardens, FL (rivalry)	ESPN	VT 42–35	53,183	
October 5	4:00 p.m.	North Carolina	Georgia Tech	Bobby Dodd Stadium • Atlanta, GA	ACCN	UNC 38–22	45,044	
October 5	8:00 p.m.	Pittsburgh	Duke	Wallace Wade Stadium • Durham, NC	ACCN	PITT 33–30	22,610	
^{#}Rankings from AP Poll released prior to game. All times are in Eastern Time.

Date	Bye Week					
October 5	No. 2 Clemson	Florida State	NC State	Syracuse	No. 23 Virginia	No. 22 Wake Forest

==== Week seven ====
Date	Time	Visiting team	Home team	Site	TV	Result	Attendance	Ref.
October 10	8:00 p.m.	Syracuse	NC State	Carter–Finley Stadium • Raleigh, NC	ESPN	NCSU 16–10	55,860	
October 11	8:00 p.m.	No. 20 Virginia	Miami	Hard Rock Stadium • Miami Gardens, FL	ESPN	MIA 17–9	54,538	
October 12	12:30 p.m.	Georgia Tech	Duke †	Wallace Wade Stadium • Durham, NC	RSN	DUKE 41–23	21,741	
October 12	3:30 p.m.	Florida State	No. 2 Clemson	Memorial Stadium • Clemson, SC (rivalry)	ABC	CLEM 45–14	80,500	
October 12	4:00 p.m.	Rhode Island	Virginia Tech	Lane Stadium • Blacksburg, VA	ACCN	W 34–17	51,716	
October 12	7:30 p.m.	Louisville	No. 19 Wake Forest	BB&T Stadium • Winston-Salem, NC	ACCN	LOU 62–59	24,434	
^{#}Rankings from AP Poll released prior to game. All times are in Eastern Time.

Date	Bye Week		
October 12	Boston College	North Carolina	Pittsburgh

==== Week eight ====
Date	Time	Visiting team	Home team	Site	TV	Result	Attendance	Ref.
October 18	8:00 p.m.	Pittsburgh	Syracuse	Carrier Dome • Syracuse, NY (rivalry)	ESPN	PITT 27–20	44,886	
October 19	Noon	NC State	Boston College †	Alumni Stadium • Chestnut Hill, MA	RSN	BC 45–24	30,275	
October 19	Noon	Georgia Tech	Miami	Hard Rock Stadium • Miami Gardens, FL	ACCN	GT 28–21 ^{OT}	54,106	
October 19	Noon	No. 3 Clemson	Louisville	Cardinal Stadium • Louisville, KY	ABC	CLEM 45–10	51,015	
October 19	3:30 p.m.	North Carolina	Virginia Tech †	Lane Stadium • Blacksburg, VA	RSN	VT 43–41 ^{6OT}	65,632	
October 19	3:30 p.m.	Duke	Virginia	Scott Stadium • Charlottesville, VA	ACCN	UVA 48–14	52,847	
October 19	7:30 p.m.	Florida State	Wake Forest	BB&T Field • Winston-Salem, NC	ACCN	WAKE 22–20	24,782	
^{#}Rankings from AP Poll released prior to game. All times are in Eastern Time.

==== Week nine ====
Date	Time	Visiting team	Home team	Site	TV	Result	Attendance	Ref.
October 26	Noon	Miami	Pittsburgh †	Heinz Field • Pittsburgh, PA	ESPN	MIA 16–12	47,918	
October 26	3:30 p.m.	Syracuse	Florida State †	Doak Campbell Stadium • Tallahassee, FL	ESPN2	FSU 35–17	50,517	
October 26	3:30 p.m.	Virginia	Louisville †	Cardinal Stadium • Louisville, KY	ACCN	LOU 28–21	48,689	
October 26	4:00 p.m.	Duke	North Carolina †	Kenan Memorial Stadium • Chapel Hill, NC (Victory Bell)	RSN	UNC 20–17	50,500	
October 26	7:30 p.m.	Boston College	No. 4 Clemson †	Memorial Stadium • Clemson, SC (O'Rourke–McFadden Trophy)	ACCN	CLEM 59–7	81,081	
^{#}Rankings from AP Poll released prior to game. All times are in Eastern Time.

Date	Bye Week			
October 26	Georgia Tech	NC State	Virginia Tech	No. 25 Wake Forest

==== Week ten ====
Date	Time	Visiting team	Home team	Site	TV	Result	Attendance	Ref.
November 2	Noon	Boston College	Syracuse	Carrier Dome • Syracuse, NY (rivalry)	ACCN	BC 58–27	42,857	
November 2	Noon	NC State	No. 23 Wake Forest	BB&T Field • Winston-Salem, NC (rivalry)	ESPN	WAKE 44–10	31,119	
November 2	2:30 p.m.	Virginia Tech	No. 16 Notre Dame	Notre Dame Stadium • South Bend, IN	NBC	L 20–21	77,622	
November 2	3:30 p.m.	Miami	Florida State	Doak Campbell Stadium • Tallahassee, FL (Florida Cup/rivalry)	ABC	MIA 27–10	63,995	
November 2	4:00 p.m.	Pittsburgh	Georgia Tech †	Bobby Dodd Stadium • Atlanta, GA	RSN	PITT 20–10	41,219	
November 2	4:00 p.m.	Wofford	No. 4 Clemson	Memorial Stadium • Clemson, SC	ACCN	W 59–14	81,500	
November 2	7:30 p.m.	Virginia	North Carolina	Kenan Memorial Stadium • Chapel Hill, NC (South's Oldest Rivalry)	ACCN	UVA 38–31	50,500	
^{#}Rankings from AP Poll released prior to game. All times are in Eastern Time.

Date	Bye Week	
November 2	Duke	Louisville

==== Week eleven ====
Date	Time	Visiting team	Home team	Site	TV	Result	Attendance	Ref.
November 9	Noon	Florida State	Boston College	Alumni Stadium • Chestnut Hill, MA	ACCN	FSU 38–31	37,312	
November 9	12:30 p.m.	Georgia Tech	Virginia †	Scott Stadium • Charlottesville, VA	RSN	UVA 33–31	44,596	
November 9	3:30 p.m.	Louisville	Miami †	Hard Rock Stadium • Miami Gardens, FL	ESPN2	MIA 52–27	53,111	
November 9	3:30 p.m.	No. 19 Wake Forest	Virginia Tech	Lane Stadium • Blacksburg, VA	ACCN	VT 36–17	65,632	
November 9	7:30 p.m.	No. 15 Notre Dame	Duke	Wallace Wade Stadium • Durham, NC	ACCN	L 7–38	40,004	
November 9	7:30 p.m.	No. 5 Clemson	NC State †	Carter–Finley Stadium • Raleigh, NC (Textile Bowl)	ABC	CLEM 55–10	57,886	
^{#}Rankings from College Football Playoff. All times are in Eastern Time.

Date	Bye Week		
November 9	North Carolina	Pittsburgh	Syracuse

==== Week twelve ====
Date	Time	Visiting team	Home team	Site	TV	Result	Attendance	Ref.
November 14	8:00 p.m.	North Carolina	Pittsburgh	Heinz Field • Pittsburgh, PA	ESPN	PITT 34–27 ^{OT}	39,290	
November 16	Noon	Alabama State	Florida State	Doak Campbell Stadium • Tallahassee, FL	RSN	W 49–12	52,857	
November 16	3:30 p.m.	Virginia Tech	Georgia Tech	Bobby Dodd Stadium • Atlanta, GA (rivalry)	RSN	VT 45–0	43,263	
November 16	3:30 p.m.	Wake Forest	No. 3 Clemson	Memorial Stadium • Clemson, SC	ABC	CLEM 52–3	80,875	
November 16	4:00 p.m.	Syracuse	Duke	Wallace Wade Stadium • Durham, NC	ACCN	CUSE 49–6	16,286	
November 16	7:30 p.m.	Louisville	NC State	Carter–Finley Stadium • Raleigh, NC	ACCN	LOU 34–20	54,089	
^{#}Rankings from College Football Playoff. All times are in Eastern Time.

Date	Bye Week		
November 16	Boston College	Miami	Virginia

==== Week thirteen ====
Date	Time	Visiting team	Home team	Site	TV	Result	Attendance	Ref.
November 21	8:00 p.m.	NC State	Georgia Tech	Bobby Dodd Stadium • Atlanta, GA	ESPN	GT 28–26	38,198	
November 23	Noon	Liberty	Virginia	Scott Stadium • Charlottesville, VA	RSN	W 55–27	37,329	
November 23	2:30 p.m.	Boston College	No. 16 Notre Dame	Notre Dame Stadium • South Bend, IN (Holy War)	NBC	L 7–40	71,827	
November 23	3:30 p.m.	Mercer	North Carolina	Kenan Memorial Stadium • Chapel Hill, NC	RSN	W 56–7	50,500	
November 23	3:30 p.m.	Pittsburgh	Virginia Tech	Lane Stadium • Blacksburg, VA	ESPN2	VT 28–0	55,936	
November 23	4:00 p.m.	Syracuse	Louisville	Cardinal Stadium • Louisville, KY	ACCN	LOU 56–34	46,769	
November 23	7:00 p.m.	Miami	FIU	Marlins Park • Miami, FL	CBSSN	L 24–30	27,339	
November 23	7:30 p.m.	Duke	Wake Forest	BB&T Field • Winston-Salem, NC	ACCN	WAKE 39–27	24,130	
^{#}Rankings from College Football Playoff. All times are in Eastern Time.

Date	Bye Week	
November 23	No. 3 Clemson	Florida State

==== Week fourteen ====
Date	Time	Visiting team	Home team	Site	TV	Result	Attendance	Ref.
November 29	Noon	No. 24 Virginia Tech	Virginia	Scott Stadium • Charlottesville, VA (Commonwealth Cup)	ABC	UVA 39–30	52,619	
November 30	Noon	No. 4 Georgia	Georgia Tech	Bobby Dodd Stadium • Atlanta, GA (Clean, Old-Fashioned Hate)	ABC	L 7–52	55,000	
November 30	Noon	No. 3 Clemson	South Carolina	Williams–Brice Stadium • Columbia, SC (rivalry)	ESPN	W 38–3	80,850	
November 30	Noon	Louisville	Kentucky	Kroger Field • Lexington, KY (Governor's Cup)	SECN	L 13–45	48,336	
November 30	12:30 p.m.	Wake Forest	Syracuse	Carrier Dome • Syracuse, NY	RSN	CUSE 39–30 ^{OT}	33,719	
November 30	3:30 p.m.	Boston College	Pittsburgh	Heinz Field • Pittsburgh, PA	ACCN	BC 26–19	40,889	
November 30	3:30 p.m.	Miami	Duke	Wallace Wade Stadium • Durham, NC	ESPN2	DUKE 27–17	15,913	
November 30	7:00 p.m.	North Carolina	NC State	Carter–Finley Stadium • Raleigh, NC (rivalry)	ACCN	UNC 41–10	56,413	
November 30	7:30 p.m.	Florida State	No. 11 Florida	Ben Hill Griffin Stadium • Gainesville, FL (Sunshine Showdown/Florida Cup)	SECN	L 17–40	89,409	
^{#}Rankings from College Football Playoff. All times are in Eastern Time.

=== Championship game ===
Date	Time	Visiting team	Home team	Site	TV	Result	Attendance	Ref.
December 7	7:30 p.m.	No. 23 Virginia	No. 3 Clemson	Bank of America Stadium • Charlotte, North Carolina	ABC	CLEM 62–17	66,810	
^{#}Rankings from College Football Playoff. All times are in Eastern Time.

== ACC vs other conferences ==
=== ACC vs Power 5 matchups ===
This is a list of the power conference teams (Big 10, Big 12, Pac-12, Notre Dame and SEC). Although the NCAA does not consider BYU a "Power Five" school, the ACC considers games against BYU as satisfying its "Power Five" scheduling requirement. The designated non-conference game between North Carolina and Wake Forest is not included in this list. All rankings are from the current AP Poll at the time of the game.

Date	Visitor	Home	Site	Significance	Score
August 24	No. 8 Florida	Miami	Camping World Stadium • Orlando, FL	Camping World Kickoff/Florida Cup/rivalry	L 20–24
August 31	South Carolina	North Carolina	Bank of America Stadium • Charlotte, NC	Belk Kickoff Game/rivalry	W 24–20
August 31	No. 2 Alabama	Duke	Mercedes-Benz Stadium • Atlanta, GA	Chick-fil-A Kickoff	L 3–42
September 2	No. 9 Notre Dame	Louisville	Cardinal Stadium • Louisville, KY		L 17–35
September 7	No. 21 Syracuse	Maryland	Maryland Stadium • College Park, MD		L 20–63
September 7	No. 12 Texas A&M	No. 1 Clemson	Memorial Stadium • Clemson, SC		W 24–10
September 13	Kansas	Boston College	Alumni Stadium • Chestnut Hill, MA		L 24–48
September 14	NC State	West Virginia	Mountaineer Field • Morgantown, WV		L 27–44
September 14	Pittsburgh	No. 13 Penn State	Beaver Stadium • University Park, PA	rivalry	L 10–17
September 21	Boston College	Rutgers	HighPoint.com Stadium • Piscataway, NJ		W 30–16
September 28	No. 18 Virginia	No. 10 Notre Dame	Notre Dame Stadium • South Bend, IN		L 20–35
November 2	Virginia Tech	No. 16 Notre Dame	Notre Dame Stadium • South Bend, IN		L 20–21
November 9	No. 15 Notre Dame	Duke	Wallace Wade Stadium • Durham, NC		L 7–38
November 23	Boston College	No. 15 Notre Dame	Notre Dame Stadium • South Bend, IN	Holy War	L 7–40
November 30	No. 3 Clemson	South Carolina	Williams–Brice Stadium • Columbia, SC	rivalry	W 38–3
November 30	Florida State	No. 8 Florida	Ben Hill Griffin Stadium • Gainesville, FL	Sunshine Showdown/Florida Cup	L 17–40
November 30	No. 4 Georgia	Georgia Tech	Bobby Dodd Stadium • Atlanta, GA	Clean, Old-Fashioned Hate	L 7–52
November 30	Louisville	Kentucky	Kroger Field • Lexington, KY	Governor's Cup	L 13–45

=== ACC vs Group of Five matchups ===
The following games include ACC teams competing against teams from the American, C-USA, MAC, Mountain West or Sun Belt.

Date	Conference	Visitor	Home	Site	Score
August 30	Mountain West	Utah State	Wake Forest	BB&T Field • Winston-Salem, NC	W 38–35
August 31	American	East Carolina	NC State	Carter–Finley Stadium • Raleigh, NC	W 34–6
August 31	Mountain West	Boise State	Florida State	Doak Campbell Stadium • Tallahassee, FL	L 31–36
September 6	C-USA	Wake Forest	Rice	Rice Stadium • Houston, TX	W 41–21
September 7	MAC	Ohio	Pittsburgh	Heinz Field • Pittsburgh, PA	W 20–10
September 7	C-USA	Old Dominion	Virginia Tech	Lane Stadium • Blacksburg, VA	W 31–17
September 7	American	South Florida	Georgia Tech	Bobby Dodd Stadium • Atlanta, GA	W 14–10
September 7	Sun Belt	Louisiana–Monroe	Florida State	Doak Campbell Stadium • Tallahassee, FL	W 45–44 ^{OT}
September 14	C-USA	Louisville	Western Kentucky	Nissan Stadium • Nashville, TN	W 38–21
September 14	C-USA	Duke	Middle Tennessee	Floyd Stadium • Murfreesboro, TN	W 41–18
September 21	MAC	Central Michigan	Miami	Hard Rock Stadium • Miami, FL	W 17–12
September 21	Sun Belt	Appalachian State	North Carolina	Kenan Memorial Stadium • Chapel Hill, NC	L 31–34
September 21	MAC	Ball State	NC State	Carter–Finley Stadium • Raleigh, NC	W 34–23
September 21	American	No. 15 UCF	Pittsburgh	Heinz Field • Pittsburgh, PA	W 35–34
September 21	MAC	Western Michigan	Syracuse	Carrier Dome • Syracuse, NY	W 52–33
September 21	C-USA	Old Dominion	No. 21 Virginia	Scott Stadium • Charlottesville, VA	W 28–17
September 21	C-USA	Charlotte	No. 1 Clemson	Memorial Stadium • Clemson, SC	W 52–10
September 28	American	Georgia Tech	Temple	Lincoln Financial Field • Pennsylvania, PA	L 2–24
November 23	C-USA	Miami	FIU	Marlins Park • Miami, FL	L 24–30

=== ACC vs FBS independents matchups ===
The following games include ACC teams competing against FBS Independents, which includes Army, Liberty, New Mexico State, or UMass.

Date	Visitor	Home	Site	Score
August 31	No. 22 Syracuse	Liberty	Williams Stadium • Lynchburg, VA	W 24–0
November 23	Liberty	Virginia	Scott Stadium • Charlottesville, VA	W 55–27

=== ACC vs FCS matchups ===
Date	Visitor	Home	Site	Score
September 6	William & Mary	Virginia	Scott Stadium • Charlottesville, VA	W 52–17
September 7	Western Carolina	NC State	Carter–Finley Stadium • Raleigh, NC	W 41–0
September 7	Richmond	Boston College	Alumni Stadium • Chestnut Hill, MA	W 45–13
September 7	North Carolina A&T	Duke	Wallace Wade Stadium • Durham, NC	W 45–13
September 7	Eastern Kentucky	Louisville	Cardinal Stadium • Louisville, KY	W 42–0
September 14	Furman	Virginia Tech	Lane Stadium • Blacksburg, VA	W 24–17
September 14	The Citadel	Georgia Tech	Bobby Dodd Stadium • Atlanta, GA	L 24–27 ^{OT}
September 14	Bethune–Cookman	Miami	Hard Rock Stadium • Miami, FL	W 63–0
September 21	Elon	Wake Forest	BB&T Field • Winston-Salem, NC	W 49–7
September 28	Delaware	Pittsburgh	Heinz Field • Pittsburgh, PA	W 17–14
September 28	Holy Cross	Syracuse	Carrier Dome • Syracuse, NY	W 41–3
October 12	Rhode Island	Virginia Tech	Lane Stadium • Blacksburg, VA	W 34–17
November 2	Wofford	Clemson	Memorial Stadium • Clemson, SC	W 59–14
November 16	Alabama State	Florida State	Doak Campbell Stadium • Tallahassee, FL	W 49–12
November 23	Mercer	North Carolina	Kenan Memorial Stadium • Chapel Hill, NC	W 56–7

=== Records against other conferences ===
Regular season

Power 5 Conferences	Record
Big Ten	1–2
Big 12	0–2
BYU/Notre Dame	0–5
Pac-12	0–0
SEC	3–6
Power 5 Total	4–15
Other FBS Conferences	Record
American	3–1
C–USA	6–1
Independents (Excluding BYU & Notre Dame)	2–0
MAC	4–0
Mountain West	1–1
Sun Belt	1–1
Other FBS Total	17–4
FCS Opponents	Record
Football Championship Subdivision	14–1
Total Non-Conference Record	35–20

Post Season

Power Conferences 5	Record
Big Ten	1–1
Big 12	0–0
BYU/Notre Dame	0–0
Pac-12	0–1
SEC	1–3
Power 5 Total	2–5
Other FBS Conferences	Record
American	1–1
C–USA	0–1
Independents (Excluding BYU & Notre Dame)	0–0
MAC	1–0
Mountain West	0–0
Sun Belt	0–0
Other FBS Total	2–2
Total Bowl Record	4–7

== Postseason ==
=== Bowl games ===
Legend
ACC win
ACC loss

Bowl game	Date	Site	Television	Time (EST)	ACC team	Opponent	Score	Attendance
2019 Independence Bowl	December 26	Independence Stadium • Shreveport, LA	ESPN	4:00 p.m.	**Miami**	Louisiana Tech	**L** 0–14	33,129
2019 Quick Lane Bowl	December 26	Ford Field • Detroit, MI	ESPN	8:00 p.m.	**Pittsburgh**	Eastern Michigan	**W** 34–30	34,765
2019 Military Bowl	December 27	Navy–Marine Corps Memorial Stadium • Annapolis, MD	ESPN	Noon	**North Carolina**	Temple	**W** 55–13	24,242
2019 Pinstripe Bowl	December 27	Yankee Stadium • New York, NY	ESPN	3:20 p.m.	**Wake Forest**	Michigan State	**L** 21–27	36,895
2019 Music City Bowl	December 30	Nissan Stadium • Nashville, TN	ESPN	4:00 p.m.	**Louisville**	Mississippi State	**W** 38–28	46,850
2019 Belk Bowl	December 31	Bank of America Stadium • Charlotte, NC	ESPN	Noon	**Virginia Tech**	Kentucky	**L** 30–37	44,138
2019 Sun Bowl	December 31	Sun Bowl • El Paso, TX	CBS	2:00 p.m.	**Florida State**	Arizona State	**L** 14–20	42,412
2020 Birmingham Bowl	January 2	Legion Field • Birmingham, AL	ESPN	Noon	**Boston College**	No. 21 Cincinnati	**L** 6–38	27,193
**New Year's Six bowl games**
2019 Orange Bowl	December 30	Hard Rock Stadium • Miami Gardens, FL	ESPN	8:00 p.m.	No. 24 **Virginia**	No. 9 Florida	**L** 28–36	65,326
**College Football Playoff bowl games**
Fiesta Bowl (CFP Semifinal)	December 28	State Farm Stadium • Glendale, AZ	ESPN	8:00 p.m.	No. 3 **Clemson**	No. 2 Ohio State	**W** 29–23	71,330
CFP National Championship	January 13	Mercedes-Benz Superdome • New Orleans, LA	ESPN	8:00 p.m.	No. 3 **Clemson**	No. 1 LSU	**L** 25–42	76,885

Rankings are from CFP rankings. All times Eastern Time Zone. ACC teams shown in bold.

== Awards and honors ==
=== Player of the week honors ===
Week	Quarterback			Running Back			Offensive Line			Receiver			Defensive Line			Linebacker			Defensive Back			Specialist			Rookie		
Week	Player	Team	Position	Player	Team	Position	Player	Team	Position	Player	Team	Position	Player	Team	Position	Player	Team	Position	Player	Team	Position	Player	Team	Position	Player	Team	Position
Week 1 (Sep. 3)	Jamie Newman	Wake Forest	QB	Travis Etienne	Clemson	RB	Charlie Heck	North Carolina	OT	Sage Surratt	Wake Forest	WR	Josh Black	Syracuse	NT	Rayshard Ashby	Virginia Tech	LB	Myles Wolfolk	North Carolina	SS	Brian Delaney	Virginia	PK	Sam Howell	North Carolina	QB
Week 2 (Sep. 9)	Sam Howell	North Carolina	QB	Cam Akers	Florida State	RB	John Simpson	Clemson	OG	Scotty Washington	Wake Forest	WR	Tomon Fox	North Carolina	DE	Charlie Thomas	Georgia Tech	LB	K'Von Wallace	Clemson	S	Joe Reed	Virginia	KR	Sam Howell (2)	North Carolina	QB
Week 2 (Sep. 9)	Sam Howell	North Carolina	QB	Cam Akers	Florida State	RB	John Phillips	Boston College	OG	Scotty Washington	Wake Forest	WR	Tomon Fox	North Carolina	DE	Charlie Thomas	Georgia Tech	LB	K'Von Wallace	Clemson	S	Joe Reed	Virginia	KR	Sam Howell (2)	North Carolina	QB
Week 3 (Sep. 16)	Trevor Lawrence	Clemson	QB	A. J. Dillon	Boston College	RB	John Simpson (2)	Clemson	OG	Sage Surratt (2)	Wake Forest	WR	Carlos Basham Jr.	Wake Forest	DE	Isaiah Simmons	Clemson	LB	Nasir Greer	Wake Forest	SS	Sterling Hofrichter	Syracuse	P	Jarren Williams	Miami	QB
Week 3 (Sep. 16)	Bryce Perkins	Virginia	QB	A. J. Dillon	Boston College	RB	John Simpson (2)	Clemson	OG	Sage Surratt (2)	Wake Forest	WR	Carlos Basham Jr.	Wake Forest	DE	Isaiah Simmons	Clemson	LB	Nasir Greer	Wake Forest	SS	Sterling Hofrichter	Syracuse	P	Jarren Williams	Miami	QB
Week 4 (Sep. 23)	Kenny Pickett	Pittsburgh	QB	A. J. Dillion (2)	Boston College	RB	Bryce Hargrove	Pittsburgh	OG	Trishton Jackson	Syracuse	WR	Marvin Wilson	Florida State	DT	Charles Snowden	Virginia	OLB	Chris Ingram	NC State	CB	Aaron Mathews	Pittsburgh	WR	Jarren Williams (2)	Miami	QB
Week 4 (Sep. 23)	Kenny Pickett	Pittsburgh	QB	Cam Akers (2)	Florida State	RB	Bryce Hargrove	Pittsburgh	OG	Trishton Jackson	Syracuse	WR	Marvin Wilson	Florida State	DT	Charles Snowden	Virginia	OLB	Chris Ingram	NC State	CB	Aaron Mathews	Pittsburgh	WR	Jarren Williams (2)	Miami	QB
Week 5 (Sep. 30)	Alex Hornibrook	Florida State	QB	A. J. Dillon (3)	Boston College	RB	Jack Wohlabaugh	Duke	C	Tee Higgins	Clemson	WR	Larrell Murchison	NC State	DT	Koby Quansah	Duke	LB	Cyrus Fagan	Florida State	S	Sterling Hofrichter (2)	Syracuse	P/PK	Amari Gainer	Florida State	LB
Week 6 (Oct. 7)	Sam Howell (2)	North Carolina	QB	Javian Hawkins	Louisville	RB	Mekhi Becton	Louisville	OT	Seth Dawkins	Louisville	WR	Patrick Jones II	Pittsburgh	DE	Rayshard Ashby (2)	Virginia Tech	LB	Paris Ford	Pittsburgh	S	Blanton Creque	Louisville	PK	Sam Howell (3)	North Carolina	QB
Week 7 (Oct. 14)	Evan Conley	Louisville	QB	Travis Etienne (2)	Clemson	RB	Matt Bockhorst	Clemson	OG	Sage Surratt (3)	Wake Forest	WR	Victor Dimukeje	Duke	DE	Louis Acceus	NC State	LB	Trajan Bandy	Miami	CB	Hassan Hall	Louisville	KR/RB	Evan Conley	Louisville	QB
Week 8 (Oct. 21)	Sam Howell (3)	North Carolina	QB	David Bailey	Boston College	RB	Zion Johnson	Boston College	OG	Sage Surratt (4)	Wake Forest	WR	Justin Foster	Clemson	DE	Rayshard Ashby (3)	Virginia Tech	LB	Joey Blount	Virginia	FS	Pressley Harvin III	Georgia Tech	P	Quincy Patterson II	Virginia Tech	QB
Week 8 (Oct. 21)	Sam Howell (3)	North Carolina	QB	David Bailey	Boston College	RB	Zion Johnson	Boston College	OG	Sage Surratt (4)	Wake Forest	WR	Justin Foster	Clemson	DE	Rayshard Ashby (3)	Virginia Tech	LB	Joey Blount	Virginia	FS	Nick Sciba	Wake Forest	PK	Quincy Patterson II	Virginia Tech	QB
Week 9 (Oct. 28)	Trevor Lawrence (2)	Clemson	QB	Cam Akers (3)	Florida State	RB	Tremayne Anchrum	Clemson	OT	Diondre Overton	Clemson	WR	Jason Strowbridge	North Carolina	DT	Chazz Surratt	North Carolina	ILB	Hamsah Nasirildeen	Florida State	S	Alex Kessman	Pittsburgh	PK	Javian Hawkins	Louisville	RB
Week 10 (Nov. 4)	Bryce Perkins (2)	Virginia	QB	A. J. Dillon (4)	Boston College	RB	Zion Johnson (2)	Boston College	OG	Dyami Brown	North Carolina	WR	Gregory Rousseau	Miami	DE	Rayshard Ashby (4)	Virginia Tech	LB	Divine Deablo	Virginia Tech	FS	Dom Maggio	Wake Forest	P	Sam Howell (4)	North Carolina	QB
Week 11 (Nov. 11)	Jarren Williams	Miami	QB	Travis Etienne (3)	Clemson	RB	John Simpson (3)	Clemson	OG	Tamorrion Terry	Florida State	WR	DaShawn Crawford	Virginia Tech	DT	Michael Pinckney	Miami	LB	Hamsah Nasirildeen (2)	Florida State	S	Oscar Bradburn	Virginia Tech	P	Jarren Williams (3)	Miami	QB
Week 12 (Nov. 18)	Kenny Pickett (2)	Pittsburgh	QB	Travis Etienne (4)	Clemson	RB	Dakota Davis	Syracuse	RG	Dazz Newsome	North Carolina	WR	Jaylen Twyman	Pittsburgh	DT	Dorian Etheridge	Louisville	LB	Hamsa Nasirildeen (3)	Florida State	S	AJ Reed	Duke	PK	Sam Howell (5)	North Carolina	QB
Week 12 (Nov. 18)	Kenny Pickett (2)	Pittsburgh	QB	Travis Etienne (4)	Clemson	RB	Dakota Davis	Syracuse	RG	Dazz Newsome	North Carolina	WR	Jaylen Twyman	Pittsburgh	DT	Lakiem Williams	Syracuse	MLB	Hamsa Nasirildeen (3)	Florida State	S	AJ Reed	Duke	PK	Sam Howell (5)	North Carolina	QB
Week 13 (Nov. 25)	Malik Cunningham	Louisville	QB	Javian Hawkins (2)	Louisville	RB	Nathan Gilliam	Wake Forest	RG	Kendall Hinton	Wake Forest	WR	Jordan Domineck	Georgia Tech	DE	Rayshard Ashby (5)	Virginia Tech	LB	De'Vante Cross	Virginia	FS	Damond Philyaw-Johnson	Duke	KR	Javian Hawkins	Louisville	RB
Week 13 (Nov. 25)	Malik Cunningham	Louisville	QB	Javian Hawkins (2)	Louisville	RB	Nathan Gilliam	Wake Forest	RG	Kendall Hinton	Wake Forest	WR	Jordan Domineck	Georgia Tech	DE	Rayshard Ashby (5)	Virginia Tech	LB	De'Vante Cross	Virginia	FS	Damond Philyaw-Johnson	Duke	KR	James Graham	Georgia Tech	QB
Week 14 (Dec. 1)	Bryce Perkins (3)	Virginia	QB	A. J. Dillion (5)	Boston College	RB	Zion Johnson (3)	Boston College	LG	Dyami Brown (2)	North Carolina	WR	Chris Rumph II	Duke	DE	Noah Taylor	Virginia	LB	Trill Williams	Syracuse	Nickelback	Andre Szmyt	Syracuse	PK	Sam Howell (6)	North Carolina	QB

=== All-Conference teams ===
First Team

Position	Player	Team
First Team Offense
QB	Trevor Lawrence	Clemson
RB	Travis Etienne	Clemson
RB	A. J. Dillon	Boston College
WR	Sage Surratt	Wake Forest
WR	Tee Higgins	Clemson
WR	Tutu Atwell	Louisville
TE	Brevin Jordan	Miami
T	Tremayne Anchrum	Clemson
T	Mekhi Becton	Louisville
G	John Simpson	Clemson
G	John Phillips	Boston College
C	Jimmy Morrissey	Pittsburgh
All Purpose Back	Joe Reed	Virginia
First Team Defense
DE	Gregory Rousseau	Miami
DE	Carlos Basham Jr.	Wake Forest
DT	Jaylen Twyman	Pittsburgh
DT	Marvin Wilson	Florida State
LB	Isaiah Simmons	Clemson
LB	Chazz Surratt	North Carolina
LB	Shaquille Quarterman	Miami
CB	Caleb Farley	Virginia Tech
CB	A. J. Terrell	Clemson
S	Paris Ford	Pittsburgh
S	Tanner Muse	Clemson
First Team Special Teams
PK	Nick Sciba	Wake Forest
P	Sterling Hofrichter	Syracuse
SP	Joe Reed	Virginia

Second Team

Position	Player	Team
Second Team Offense
QB	Bryce Perkins	Virginia
RB	Cam Akers	Florida State
RB	Javian Hawkins	Louisville
WR	Dazz Newsome	North Carolina
WR	Tamorrion Terry	Florida State
WR	Trishton Jackson	Syracuse
TE	Noah Gray	Duke
T	Charlie Heck	North Carolina
T	Ben Petrula	Boston College
G	Gage Cervenka	Clemson
G	Zion Johnson	Boston College
C	Sean Pollard	Clemson
All Purpose Back	Hassan Hall	Louisville
Second Team Defense
DE	Patrick Jones II	Pittsburgh
DE	Victor Dimukeje	Duke
DT	Larrell Murchison	NC State
DT	Tyler Davis	Clemson
LB	Rayshard Ashby	Virginia Tech
LB	Max Richardson	Boston College
LB	Michael Pinckney	Miami
CB	Dane Jackson	Pittsburgh
CB	Derion Kendrick	Clemson
S	Hamsah Nasirildeen	Florida State
S	Andre Cisco	Syracuse
Second Team Special Teams
PK	Christopher Dunn	NC State
P	Dom Maggio	Wake Forest
SP	Damond Philyaw-Johnson	Duke

Third Team

Position	Player	Team
Third Team Offense
QB	Sam Howell	North Carolina
RB	Jordan Mason	Georgia Tech
RB	Michael Carter	North Carolina
WR	Kendall Hinton	Wake Forest
WR	Maurice Ffrench	Pittsburgh
WR	Dyami Brown	North Carolina
TE	Hunter Long	Boston College
T	Justin Herron	Wake Forest
T	Jackson Carman	Clemson
G	Bryce Hargrove	Pittsburgh
G	Nate Gilliam	Wake Forest
C	Alec Lindstrom	Boston College
All Purpose Back	Maurice Ffrench	Pittsburgh
Third Team Defense
DE	Xavier Thomas	Clemson
DE	Chris Rumph II	Duke
DT	Jason Strowbridge	North Carolina
DT	Nyles Pinckney	Clemson
LB	Jordan Mack	Virginia
LB	Lakiem Williams	Syracuse
LB	Koby Quansah	Duke
CB	Asante Samuel Jr.	Florida State
CB	Essang Bassey	Wake Forest
S	K'Von Wallace	Clemson
S	Joey Blount	Virginia
Third Team Special Teams
PK	Andre Szmyt	Syracuse
P	Trenton Gill	NC State
SP	Hassan Hall	Louisville

=== ACC Individual Awards ===
ACC Player of the Year

Travis Etienne

ACC Rookie of the Year

Sam Howell

ACC Coach of the Year

Scott Satterfield

ACC Offensive Player of the Year

Travis Etienne

ACC Offensive Rookie of the Year

Sam Howell

Jacobs Blocking Trophy

Mekhi Becton

ACC Defensive Player of the Year

Isaiah Simmons

ACC Defensive Rookie of the Year

Gregory Rousseau

=== All-Americans ===
==== Consensus ====
2019 Consensus All-Americans
Unanimous	Consensus
Isaiah Simmons – Clemson	John Simpson – Clemson

==== Associated Press ====
2019 AP All-Americans
First Team	Second Team	Third Team
Isaiah Simmons – Clemson	Travis Etienne – Clemson; John Simpson – Clemson; Jaylen Twyman – Pittsburgh	A. J. Dillon – Boston College; Nick Sciba – Wake Forest; Tanner Muse – Clemson; Sterling Hofrichter – Syracuse

==== Walter Camp ====
2019 Walter Camp All-Americans
First Team	Second Team	Third Team
John Simpson – Clemson; Isaiah Simmons – Clemson; Joe Reed – Virginia	Travis Etienne – Clemson; Jaylen Twyman – Pittsburgh	None

==== FWAA ====
2019 FWAA All-Americans
First Team	Second Team
John Simpson – Clemson; Isaiah Simmons – Clemson	Travis Etienne – Clemson; Gregory Rousseau – Miami; Jaylen Twyman – Pittsburgh; Nick Sciba – Wake Forest; Sterling Hofrichter – Syracuse

=== National Award Winners ===
- Isaiah Simmons – Butkus Award

== Home game attendance ==
Team	Stadium	Capacity	Game 1	Game 2	Game 3	Game 4	Game 5	Game 6	Game 7	Total	Average	% of Capacity
Boston College	Alumni Stadium	44,500	35,213	30,111	32,848	39,352†	30,275	37,312		205,111	34,185	76.82%
Clemson	Memorial Stadium	81,500	79,118	81,500†	81,500†	80,500	81,081	81,500†	80,875	566,074	80,868	99.22%
Duke	Wallace Wade Stadium	40,000	38,313	22,610	21,741	**40,004**†	16,286	15,913		154,867	25,811	64.53%
Florida State	Doak Campbell Stadium	79,560	52,969	46,350	60,351	50,517	63,995†	52,857		327,039	54,507	68.51%
Georgia Tech	Bobby Dodd Stadium	55,000	46,599	42,871	45,044	41,219	43,263	38,198	55,000†	312,194	44,599	81.09%
Louisville	Cardinal Stadium	60,800	58,187†	48,808	46,007	51,015	48,689	46,769		354,013	50,573	83.18%
Miami	Hard Rock Stadium	65,326	52,036	49,997	53,183	54,538†	54,106	53,111		316,971	52,829	80.87%
North Carolina	Kenan Memorial Stadium	50,500	50,500	50,500	50,500	50,500	50,500	50,500		303,000	50,500	100%
NC State	Carter–Finley Stadium	57,583	**57,633**	55,681	**57,702**	55,860	**57,886**†	54,089	56,413	395,264	56,466	98.06%
Pittsburgh	Heinz Field	68,400	47,144	42,168	42,056	44,141	47,918†	39,290	40,889	303,606	43,372	63.41%
Syracuse	Carrier Dome	49,262	**50,248**†	40,700	40,575	44,886	42,857	33,719		252,985	42,164	85.59%
Virginia	Scott Stadium	61,500	45,250	57,826†	44,573	52,847	44,596	37,329	52,619	335,040	47,863	77.83%
Virginia Tech	Lane Stadium	65,632	57,282	52,314	59,537	51,716	65,632†	65,632†	55,936	408,049	58,293	88.01%
Wake Forest	BB&T Field	31,500	29,027	31,345†	24,079	24,434	24,782	31,199	24,130	189,176	27,025	85.79%

Bold – Exceeded capacity
†Season High

== NFL Draft ==
Round #	Pick #	NFL team	Player	Position	College
1	8	Arizona Cardinals	Isaiah Simmons	LB	Clemson
1	11	New York Jets	Mekhi Becton	OT	Louisville
1	16	Atlanta Falcons	A. J. Terrell	CB	Clemson
2	33	Cincinnati Bengals	Tee Higgins	WR	Clemson
2	52	Los Angeles Rams	Cam Akers	RB	Florida State
2	62	Green Bay Packers	A. J. Dillon	RB	Boston College
3	100	Las Vegas Raiders	Tanner Muse	ILB	Clemson
3	101	New England Patriots	Dalton Keene	TE	Virginia Tech
4	109	Las Vegas Raiders	John Simpson	G	Clemson
4	126	Houston Texans	Charlie Heck	OT	North Carolina
4	127	Philadelphia Eagles	K'Von Wallace	S	Clemson
4	140	Jacksonville Jaguars	Shaquille Quarterman	LB	Miami
4	144	Seattle Seahawks	DeeJay Dallas	RB	Miami
5	148	Seattle Seahawks	Alton Robinson	DE	Syracuse
5	151	Los Angeles Chargers	Joe Reed	WR	Virginia
5	154	Miami Dolphins	Jason Strowbridge	DE	North Carolina
5	158	New York Jets	Bryce Hall	CB	Virginia
5	174	Tennessee Titans	Larrell Murchison	DT	NC State
5	176	Minnesota Vikings	K. J. Osborn	WR	Miami
5	178	Denver Broncos	Justin Strnad	LB	Wake Forest
6	195	New England Patriots	Justin Herron	OT	Wake Forest
6	206	Jacksonville Jaguars	Tyler Davis	TE	Georgia Tech
7	228	Atlanta Falcons	Sterling Hofrichter	P	Syracuse
7	229	Washington Redskins	James Smith-Williams	DE	NC State
7	239	Buffalo Bills	Dane Jackson	CB	Pittsburgh
7	242	Green Bay Packers	Jonathan Garvin	DE	Miami
7	250	Los Angeles Rams	Tremayne Anchrum	G	Clemson
