= Paris Ford =

American football player (born 1998)

Profile
- Position: Safety

Personal information
- Born: June 6, 1998 (age 28); Pittsburgh, Pennsylvania, U.S.
- Listed height: 6 ft 0 in (1.83 m)
- Listed weight: 190 lb (86 kg)

Career information
- High school: Steel Valley
- College: Pittsburgh
- NFL draft: 2021: undrafted

Career history
- Los Angeles Rams (2021)*; New Jersey Generals (2022–2023); Massachusetts Pirates (2024)
- * Offseason or practice squad member only

Awards and highlights
- First-team All-ACC (2019)
- Stats at Pro Football Reference

Paris Ford (born June 6, 1998) is an American professional football safety. He played college football for the Pittsburgh Panthers.

== Early life ==
Ford was born and grew up in Pittsburgh, Pennsylvania and originally attended Seton-La Salle Catholic High School, where he played both defensive back and wide receiver on the football team. He transferred to Steel Valley High School midway through his junior year. Ford was named Class 2A All-State and an Under Armour All-American as a senior after scoring 22 touchdowns five different ways (rushing, receiving, interception return, punt return and fumble return).

== College career ==
Ford redshirted his true freshman season. As a redshirt freshman he played in nine games on special teams. Ford was named a starter at safety going into his redshirt sophomore season. He finished the year with 97 tackles, 2.5 tackles for loss, and three forced fumbles with 14 passes defended and three interceptions and was named first-team All-Atlantic Coast Conference. Going into his redshirt junior year, Ford was named to the Chuck Bednarik Award, Jim Thorpe Award and Bronko Nagurski Trophy watchlists, and was a preseason All-American. After playing in seven games in 2020, Ford opted out of the remainder of the season to prepare for the draft, ending the season while he led the team with 45 tackles and 3 interceptions.

== Professional career ==
Ford returned to Pittsburgh to work out at the school's pro day on March 17, 2021, where he explained that his decision to opt out was also motivated by a desire to help his family financially.

Pre-draft measurables
Height	Weight	Arm length	Hand span	40-yard dash	10-yard split	20-yard split	20-yard shuttle	Three-cone drill	Vertical jump	Broad jump
6 ft 0 5/8 in (1.84 m)	197 lb (89 kg)	32 3/8 in (0.82 m)	9 1/2 in (0.24 m)	4.85 s	1.56 s	2.81 s	4.45 s	7.44 s	28.5 in (0.72 m)	9 ft 2 in (2.79 m)
All values from 2021 Pittsburgh Pro Day

=== Los Angeles Rams ===
Despite some analysts viewing him as having late-round talent, Ford was not selected in the 2021 NFL draft. On May 1, 2021, Ford signed as an undrafted free agent with the Los Angeles Rams. He was waived on August 23, 2021.

=== New Jersey Generals ===
On March 10, 2022, Ford was selected by the New Jersey Generals of the United States Football League. He was transferred to the team's practice squad on April 14, 2022, and remained on the inactive roster on April 22. He was transferred to the active roster on April 30.

Ford re-signed with the Generals on July 14, 2023. The Generals folded when the XFL and USFL merged to create the United Football League (UFL).

=== Massachusetts Pirates ===
On May 19, 2024, the Massachusetts Pirates signed Ford.
