= Hamsah Nasirildeen =

American football player (born 1999)

Profile
- Position: Linebacker

Personal information
- Born: January 23, 1999 (age 27); Concord, North Carolina, U.S.
- Listed height: 6 ft 3 in (1.91 m)
- Listed weight: 215 lb (98 kg)

Career information
- High school: Concord
- College: Florida State (2017–2020)
- NFL draft: 2021: 6th round, 186th overall pick

Career history
- New York Jets (2021–2022)

Awards and highlights
- Second-team All-ACC (2019)

Career NFL statistics
- Total tackles: 14
- Stats at Pro Football Reference

Hamsah Nasirildeen (born January 17, 1999) is an American professional football linebacker. He played college football at Florida State.

== Early life ==
Nasirildeen grew up in Concord, North Carolina and attended Concord High School, where he played safety, linebacker, tight end and wide receiver on the football team. He first played defense as a junior and made 85 tackles, five interceptions, two forced fumbles and broke up seven passes and also caught 35 passes for 634 yards on offense. He was named a US Army All-American as a senior after making 108 tackles with three interceptions and 45 receptions for 751 yards and five touchdowns. Rated one of the best recruits in North Carolina, he initially committed to play college football at South Carolina going into his senior year, but he later flipped his commitment to Florida State.

== College career ==
As a true freshman, Nasirildeen played in all 13 of Florida State's games and recorded 29 tackles with two passes broken up. He again played in all of the Seminoles games with five starts at safety in his sophomore season, finishing the year with a team-leading 91 tackles, an interception and two pass breakups. As a junior he recorded 101 tackles, two tackles for loss, one sack, three forced fumbles, a fumble recovery, three passes broken up and two interceptions before he suffered a leg injury against Florida.

== Professional career ==
Pre-draft measurables
Height	Weight	Arm length	Hand span	20-yard shuttle	Three-cone drill	Vertical jump	Bench press
6 ft 3 1/4 in (1.91 m)	215 lb (98 kg)	34 1/2 in (0.88 m)	9 3/4 in (0.25 m)	4.27 s	7.05 s	32.0 in (0.81 m)	17 reps
All values from Pro Day

Nasirildeen was selected by the New York Jets in the sixth round with the 186th overall pick of the 2021 NFL draft. He was placed on injured reserve on October 5. He was activated on November 4, 2021.

On August 30, 2022, Nasirildeen was waived by the Jets and signed to the practice squad the next day. He was promoted to the active roster on December 17.

On August 6, 2023, Nasirildeen was waived by the Jets.
