= Mekhi Becton =

American football player (born 1999)

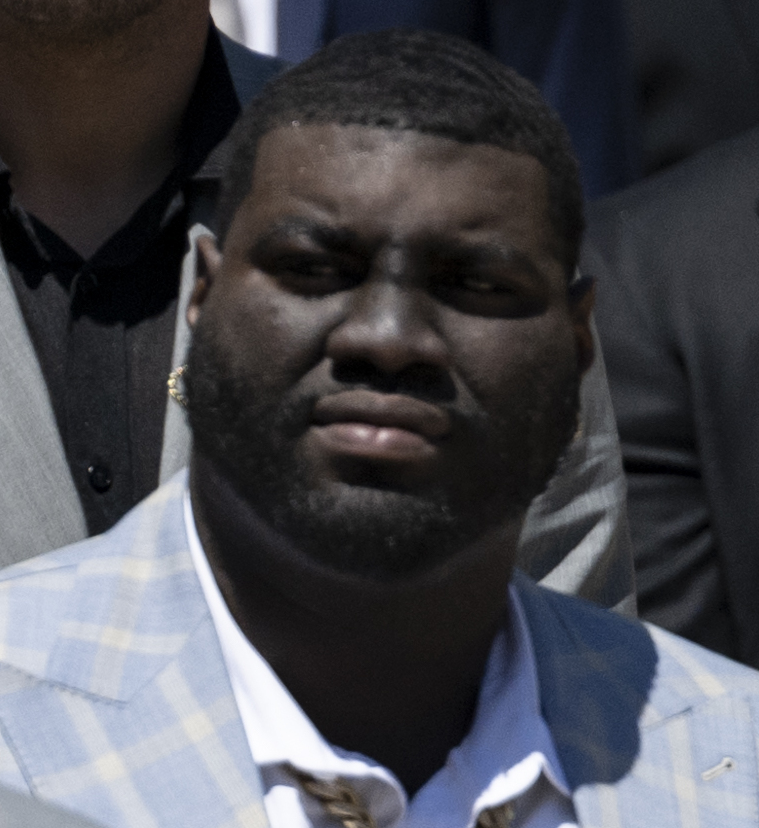
- Becton in 2025

No. 74 – Green Bay Packers
- Position: Offensive tackle
- Roster status: Active

Personal information
- Born: April 18, 1999 (age 27); Highland Springs, Virginia, U.S.
- Listed height: 6 ft 7 in (2.01 m)
- Listed weight: 357 lb (162 kg)

Career information
- High school: Highland Springs
- College: Louisville (2017–2019)
- NFL draft: 2020: 1st round, 11th overall pick

Career history
- New York Jets (2020–2023); Philadelphia Eagles (2024); Los Angeles Chargers (2025); Green Bay Packers (2026–present)

Awards and highlights
- Super Bowl champion (LIX); Jacobs Blocking Award (2019); First-team All-ACC (2019)

Career NFL statistics as of Week 10, 2026
- Games played: 63
- Games started: 59
- Stats at Pro Football Reference

Mekhi Becton Sr. (born April 18, 1999), nicknamed "Big Ticket", is an American professional football offensive tackle for the Green Bay Packers of the National Football League (NFL). He played college football for the Louisville Cardinals and was selected by the New York Jets in the first round of the 2020 NFL draft. He has also played in the NFL for the Philadelphia Eagles and Los Angeles Chargers.

== Early life ==
Becton attended Highland Springs High School in Highland Springs, Virginia. He was regarded as a three-star prospect, ranked as the No. 43 offensive tackle and No. 405 overall recruit in the 247Sports Composite. Becton was recruited by 31 schools to play football, but by February 1, 2017, National Signing Day, he had narrowed the choice to five schools: Louisville, Virginia, Virginia Tech, Michigan, and Oregon. While he had been heavily recruited by Virginia, he ultimately chose Louisville on signing day.. He also played basketball in high school.

== College career ==
Becton played as a freshman in the 2017 season. During his freshman year, Becton played in 13 games and started 11 for the Cardinals at the tackle position. During the first 4 games of the season, Becton was the highest rated freshman in the country by Pro Football Focus, and during the 7 he was the best pass-blocker in the Atlantic Coast Conference (ACC), allowing only 6 pressures in 312 snaps.

Becton was named a starting tackle for the 2018 season and started every game, bringing his total number of games started to 23 by the end of the season. Becton was again named a starting tackle for the 2019 season. He received first team All-ACC honors after the conclusion of the regular season. Becton decided to forgo his senior season and sit out Louisville's bowl game, and declared for the 2020 NFL draft.

== Professional career ==
Pre-draft measurables
Height	Weight	Arm length	Hand span	Wingspan	40-yard dash	10-yard split	20-yard split	Bench press	Wonderlic
6 ft 7 3/8 in (2.02 m)	364 lb (165 kg)	35 5/8 in (0.90 m)	10 3/4 in (0.27 m)	6 ft 11 1/4 in (2.11 m)	5.10 s	1.77 s	2.94 s	23 reps	15
All values from NFL Combine

=== New York Jets ===
Becton was selected in the first round with the 11th overall pick by the New York Jets in the 2020 NFL draft.

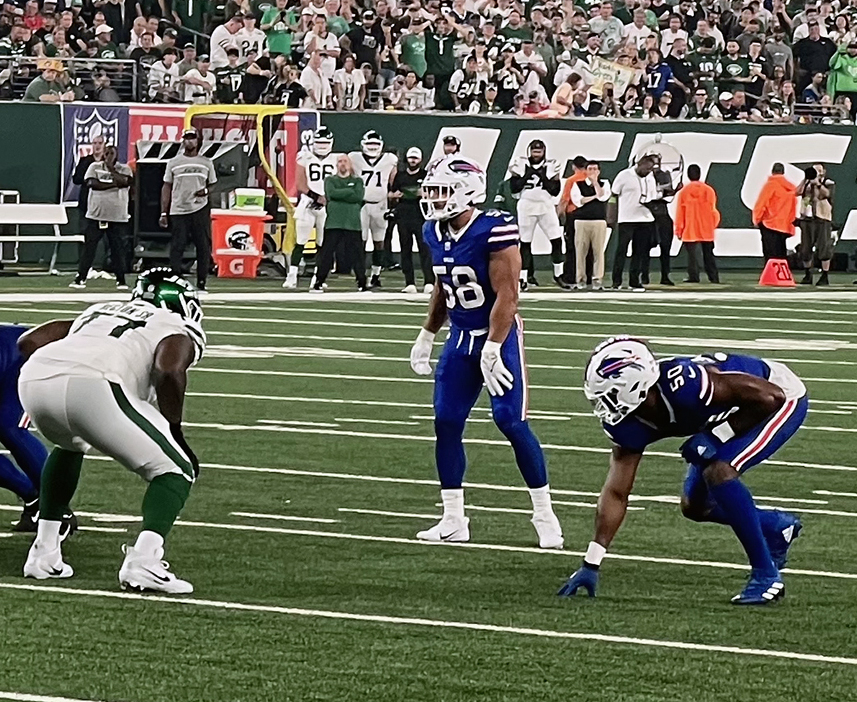
Becton (#77) against the Buffalo Bills in 2023

On September 12, 2021, Becton suffered an apparent knee injury and was carted off the field. It was revealed that Becton had suffered cartilage damage, which required surgery, putting him out for 4–6 weeks. He was placed on injured reserve on September 14, 2021.

On July 27, 2022, after George Fant was moved to left tackle, Becton was shifted to right tackle. On August 8, during training camp, Becton was diagnosed with an avulsion fracture of his right kneecap. Eight days later, the Jets placed him on injured reserve, and he missed the entire 2022 season.

Becton was mostly healthy in 2023 and started 16 games.

=== Philadelphia Eagles ===
On April 29, 2024, Becton signed a one-year contract with the Philadelphia Eagles. With little chance of gaining a starting spot at the tackle position, he was given the opportunity to move to guard. The transition was so successful that he quickly became the Eagles starting right guard. He started 15 games and helped the Eagles win Super Bowl LIX against the Kansas City Chiefs.

=== Los Angeles Chargers ===
On March 14, 2025, Becton signed a two-year, $20 million contract with the Los Angeles Chargers.

On March 4, 2026, the Chargers released Becton, saving $9.7 million against the salary cap.

=== Green Bay Packers ===
On September 28, 2026, Becton signed with the Green Bay Packers practice squad. He was promoted to the active roster on October 26.

== NFL career statistics ==
Legend
	Won the Super Bowl
**Bold**	Career high

=== Regular season ===
Year	Team	Games		Offense					
Year	Team	GP	GS	Snaps	Pct	Holding	False Start	Decl/Pen	Acpt/Pen
2020	NYJ	14	13	691	81%	0	5	1	6
2021	NYJ	1	1	48	74%	0	1	0	1
2022	NYJ	Did not play due to injury							
2023	NYJ	16	16	**987**	**95%**	**3**	**8**	**4**	**12**
2024	PHI	15	15	903	88%	1	1	0	2
2025	LAC	15	14	734	72%	2	2	1	4
Career		61	59	3,363	-	6	17	6	25

== Personal life ==
Becton has two younger brothers.

He is an avid builder of Lego sets.
