= Victor Dimukeje =

American football player (born 1999)

Profile
- Position: Defensive end

Personal information
- Born: November 18, 1999 (age 26); Lagos, Nigeria
- Listed height: 6 ft 2 in (1.88 m)
- Listed weight: 262 lb (119 kg)

Career information
- High school: Boys' Latin School (Baltimore, Maryland, U.S.)
- College: Duke (2017–2020)
- NFL draft: 2021: 6th round, 210th overall pick

Career history
- Arizona Cardinals (2021–2024); New York Giants (2025); San Francisco 49ers (2026)*
- * Offseason or practice squad member only

Awards and highlights
- Second-team All-ACC (2019)

Career NFL statistics as of 2025
- Total tackles: 70
- Sacks: 4
- Forced fumbles: 2
- Pass deflections: 2
- Stats at Pro Football Reference

Victor Dimukeje (born November 18, 1999) is a Nigerian professional American football defensive end. He played college football for the Duke Blue Devils, and was selected by the Arizona Cardinals in the sixth round of the 2021 NFL draft.

== Early life ==
Dimukeje was born in Lagos, Nigeria and moved to Baltimore, Maryland at the age of 8.

== Professional career ==
Pre-draft measurables
Height	Weight	Arm length	Hand span	Wingspan	40-yard dash	10-yard split	20-yard split	20-yard shuttle	Three-cone drill	Vertical jump	Broad jump	Bench press
6 ft 1 1/2 in (1.87 m)	262 lb (119 kg)	33 1/8 in (0.84 m)	9 1/2 in (0.24 m)	6 ft 8 1/8 in (2.04 m)	4.83 s	1.72 s	2.88 s	4.38 s	7.20 s	34.5 in (0.88 m)	9 ft 7 in (2.92 m)	28 reps
All values from Pro Day

=== Arizona Cardinals ===
Dimukeje was selected by the Arizona Cardinals in the sixth round (210th overall) of the 2021 NFL draft. He signed his four-year rookie contract with Arizona on May 25, 2021. Dimukeje primarily played on special teams as a rookie.

=== New York Giants ===
On March 18, 2025, Dimukeje signed with the New York Giants. On May 8, it was announced that Dimukeje had suffered a torn pectoral muscle during offseason workouts with the team. In five appearances for the team, he recorded one pass deflection and three combined tackles. On December 13, Dimukeje was placed on season-ending injured reserve due to a knee injury.

=== San Francisco 49ers ===
On August 17, 2026, Dimukeje signed with the San Francisco 49ers. On August 27, Dimukeje was placed on season-ending injured reserve. On September 3, Dimukeje was waived by San Francisco with an injury settlement.
