= K'Von Wallace =

American football player (born 1997)

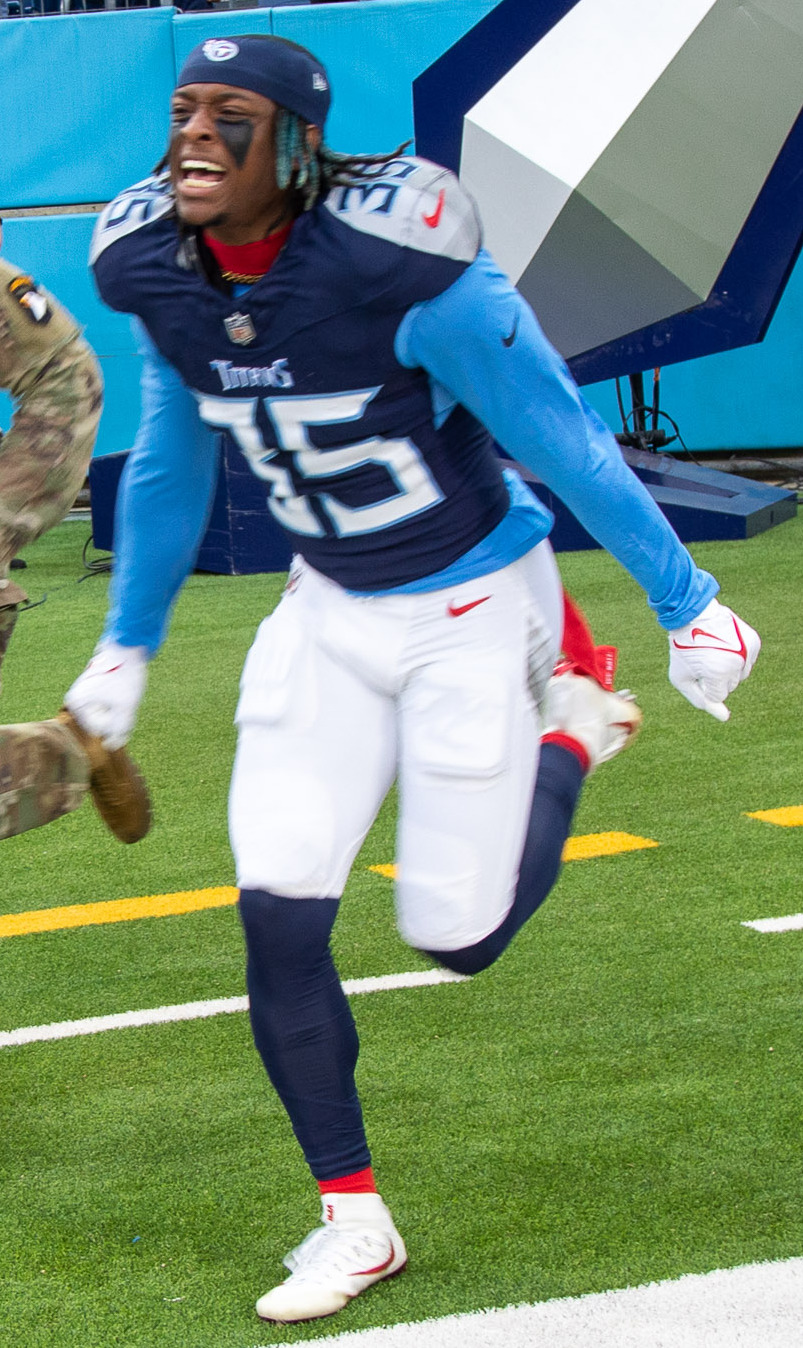
- Wallace with the Tennessee Titans in 2023

No. 25 – Baltimore Ravens
- Position: Safety
- Roster status: Active

Personal information
- Born: July 25, 1997 (age 29); Highland Springs, Virginia, U.S.
- Listed height: 5 ft 11 in (1.80 m)
- Listed weight: 205 lb (93 kg)

Career information
- High school: Highland Springs
- College: Clemson (2016–2019)
- NFL draft: 2020: 4th round, 127th overall pick

Career history
- Philadelphia Eagles (2020–2022); Arizona Cardinals (2023); Tennessee Titans (2023); Seattle Seahawks (2024); New York Giants (2025)*; Minnesota Vikings (2025)*; Houston Texans (2025); Baltimore Ravens (2026–present)
- * Offseason or practice squad member only

Awards and highlights
- CFP national champion (2018); Third-team All-ACC (2019)

Career NFL statistics as of 2025
- Total tackles: 177
- Forced fumbles: 1
- Fumble recoveries: 1
- Interceptions: 1
- Pass deflections: 8
- Stats at Pro Football Reference

K'Von Wallace (born July 25, 1997) is an American professional football safety for the Baltimore Ravens of the National Football League (NFL). He played college football for the Clemson Tigers and was selected by the Philadelphia Eagles in the fourth round of the 2020 NFL draft.

== Early life ==
Wallace attended Highland Springs High School in Highland Springs, Virginia. He played defensive back and wide receiver in high school and helped lead the Springers to a state championship as a senior in 2015. He committed to Clemson University to play college football.

== College career ==
Wallace played at Clemson from 2016 to 2019. During his career he played in 59 games with 36 starts. He was a member of the Tigers 2016 and 2018 national championship teams. He finished his career with 156 tackles, five interceptions, two sacks and a touchdown.

== Professional career ==
Pre-draft measurables
Height	Weight	Arm length	Hand span	Wingspan	40-yard dash	10-yard split	20-yard split	20-yard shuttle	Three-cone drill	Vertical jump	Broad jump	Bench press
5 ft 11 in (1.80 m)	206 lb (93 kg)	31 in (0.79 m)	9 1/8 in (0.23 m)	6 ft 1 1/2 in (1.87 m)	4.53 s	1.55 s	2.62 s	4.15 s	6.76 s	38.0 in (0.97 m)	11 ft 1 in (3.38 m)	18 reps
All values from NFL Combine

=== Philadelphia Eagles ===
Wallace was selected by the Philadelphia Eagles in the fourth round with the 127th overall pick of the 2020 NFL draft. In a week 2 matchup against the Los Angeles Rams, Wallace recovered a fumble by wide receiver Cooper Kupp on a punt return in the 37–19 loss.

On September 28, 2021, Wallace was placed on injured reserve after suffering a partially separated shoulder in Week 3. He was activated on October 30.

On January 29, 2023, Wallace was slammed to the ground by San Francisco 49ers offensive tackle Trent Williams after a scuffle between the two teams during the NFC Championship. Both players were ejected from the game.

On August 29, 2023, Wallace was waived by the Eagles.

=== Arizona Cardinals ===
On August 30, 2023, Wallace was claimed off waivers by the Arizona Cardinals. After starting five games for the team, Wallace was waived on October 24, 2023.

=== Tennessee Titans ===
On October 25, 2023, Wallace was claimed off waivers by the Tennessee Titans.

=== Seattle Seahawks ===
On March 20, 2024, Wallace signed with the Seattle Seahawks. On November 11, he was placed on injured reserve. Wallace became a free agent on March 11, 2025.

=== New York Giants ===
On July 22, 2025, Wallace signed with the New York Giants. He was released on August 24.

=== Minnesota Vikings ===
On August 28, 2025, Wallace signed with the Minnesota Vikings' practice squad. He was released by Minnesota on October 28.

=== Houston Texans ===
On November 13, 2025, Wallace signed with the practice squad of the Houston Texans. On December 26, Wallace was signed to Houston's active roster. He was waived on January 6, 2026 and re-signed to the practice squad two days later.

=== Baltimore Ravens ===
On May 11, 2026, Wallace signed with the Baltimore Ravens. On August 30, Wallace was released by Baltimore as a part of final roster cuts; he was re-signed to the team's practice squad the next day. On September 30, Wallace was promoted to the active roster.

== NFL career statistics ==
Legend
**Bold**	Career high

Year	Team	Games		Tackles					Interceptions						Fumbles		
Year	Team	GP	GS	Cmb	Solo	Ast	Sck	Sfty	Int	Yds	Avg	Lng	TD	PD	FF	FR	TD
2020	PHI	15	3	21	15	6	0.0	0	0	0	0.0	0	0	0	0	**1**	0
2021	PHI	15	3	15	12	3	0.0	0	0	0	0.0	0	1	0	0	0	0
2022	PHI	**17**	1	28	21	7	0.0	0	0	0	0.0	0	0	2	0	0	0
2023	ARI	7	5	43	26	**17**	0.0	0	**1**	**2**	**2.0**	**2**	0	**4**	0	0	0
2023	TEN	10	**7**	**46**	**36**	10	0.0	0	0	0	0.0	0	1	2	0	0	0
2024	SEA	9	0	15	9	6	0.0	0	0	0	0.0	0	0	0	**1**	0	0
2025	HOU	3	1	9	7	2	0.0	0	0	0	0.0	0	0	0	0	0	0
2026	BAL	5	0	14	13	1	0.0	0	0	0	0.0	0	0	0	0	0	0
Career		79	20	191	139	52	0	0	1	2	2.0	2	7	8	1	1	0
