= Larrell Murchison =

American football player (born 1997)

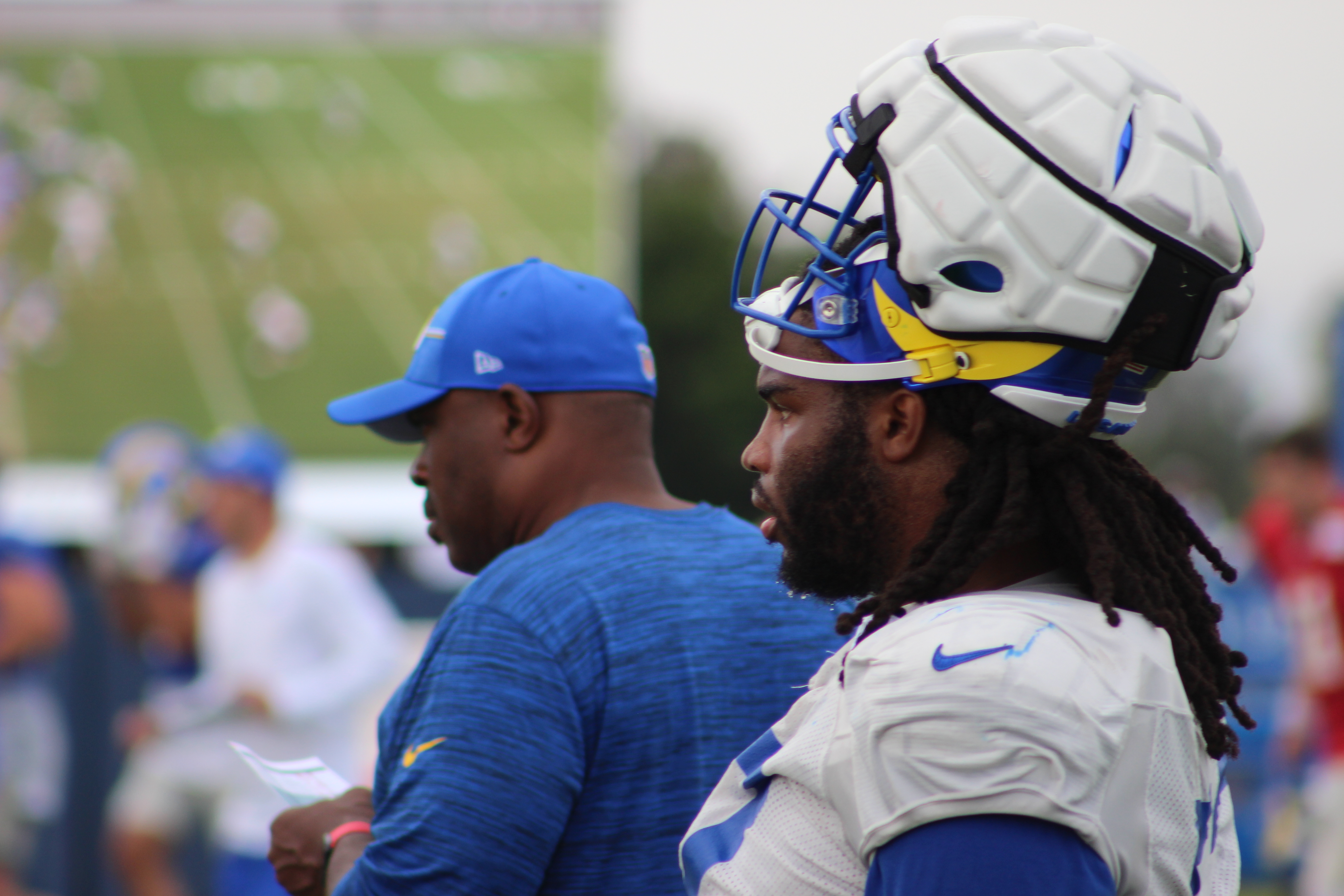
- Murchison with the Los Angeles Rams in 2023

No. 52 – Los Angeles Rams
- Position: Defensive end
- Roster status: Active

Personal information
- Born: April 24, 1997 (age 29); Elizabethtown, North Carolina, U.S.
- Listed height: 6 ft 2 in (1.88 m)
- Listed weight: 295 lb (134 kg)

Career information
- High school: East Bladen (Elizabethtown)
- College: Louisburg (2015–2016); NC State (2017–2019)
- NFL draft: 2020: 5th round, 174th overall pick

Career history
- Tennessee Titans (2020–2022); Los Angeles Rams (2022–present)

Awards and highlights
- Second-team All-ACC (2019)

Career NFL statistics as of 2025
- Total tackles: 45
- Sacks: 4
- Stats at Pro Football Reference

Larrell Montale Murchison (born April 24, 1997) is an American professional football defensive end for the Los Angeles Rams of the National Football League (NFL). He played college football for the Louisburg Hurricanes and NC State Wolfpack, and was selected in the fifth round of the 2020 NFL draft by the Tennessee Titans.

== Early life ==
Murchison grew up in Elizabethtown, North Carolina and attended East Bladen High School. He played defensive line and fullback on the football team while his twin brother, Farrell, played halfback. As a senior, he rushed for 545 yards and five touchdowns on offense and made 83 tackles on defense. He and Farrell both originally committed to play college football at Winston-Salem State, but ultimately they opted to enroll in junior college.

== College career ==
Murchison began his collegiate career at Louisburg College. As a sophomore, he had 41 tackles, 17.5 tackles for loss and 5.5 sacks and was named an honorable mention Junior College All-American. He committed to transfer to Ole Miss over offers from Georgia and Texas before flipping his commitment to North Carolina State late in the recruiting process.

Murchison redshirted his first season with the Wolfpack. He became a starter at defensive tackle going into his senior season and finished the year with 34 tackles, eight tackles for loss and four sacks. In his final season Murchison recorded 48 total tackles, 12 tackles for loss, seven sacks, two passes defended and two of fumble recoveries.

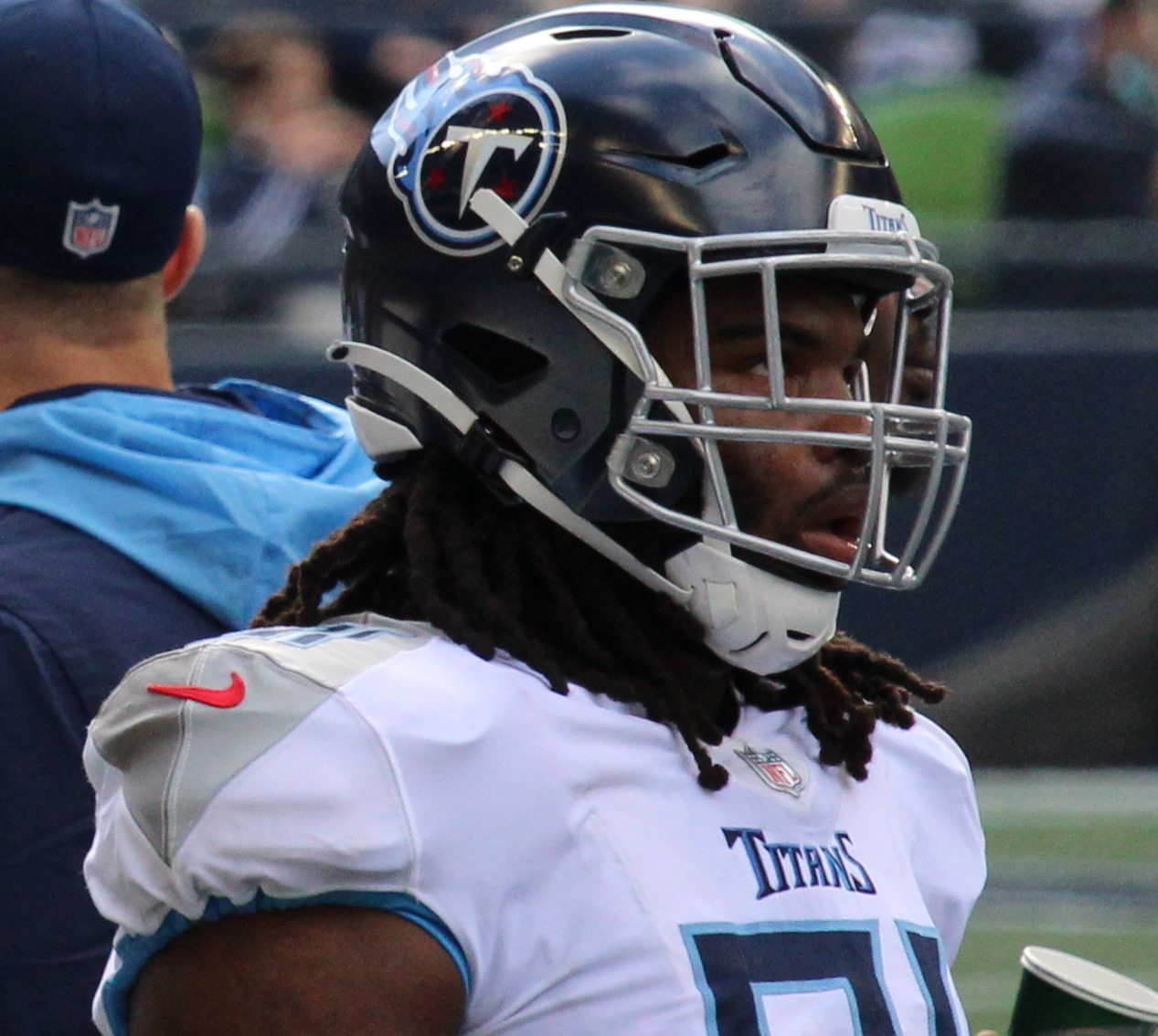
Murchison with the Titans in 2021

== Professional career ==
Pre-draft measurables
| Height | Weight | Arm length | Hand span | Wingspan | 40-yard dash | 10-yard split | 20-yard split | 20-yard shuttle | Three-cone drill | Vertical jump | Broad jump | Bench press |
|---|---|---|---|---|---|---|---|---|---|---|---|---|
| 6 ft 2 1/2 in (1.89 m) | 297 lb (135 kg) | 32 5/8 in (0.83 m) | 10 in (0.25 m) | 6 ft 7 3/8 in (2.02 m) | 5.05 s | 1.81 s | 2.94 s | 4.51 s | 7.89 s | 29.0 in (0.74 m) | 9 ft 10 in (3.00 m) | 29 reps |
All values from NFL Combine

=== Tennessee Titans ===
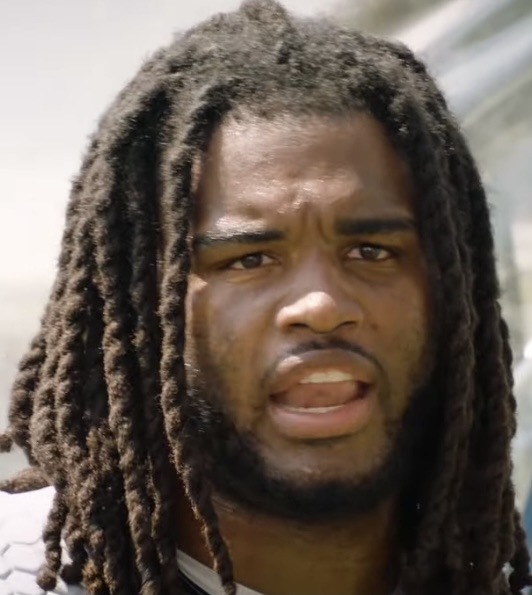
Murchison in 2021

Murchison was selected in the fifth round of the 2020 NFL draft with the 174th overall pick by the Tennessee Titans. On May 13, 2020, Murchison signed a four-year deal with the Titans and was the first of the 2020 draft class to sign a rookie contract. Murchison made his NFL debut on September 20, against the Jacksonville Jaguars, making one tackle.

On October 1, 2021, Murchison was placed on injured reserve after suffering an elbow injury in Week 3. He was activated on October 23.

On August 30, 2022, Murchison was waived by the Titans and re–signed to the practice squad the next day. He was promoted to the active roster on November 15. Murchison was waived again on December 10.

=== Los Angeles Rams ===
On December 12, 2022, Murchison was claimed off waivers by the Los Angeles Rams. He made the first two sacks of his NFL career during his Rams debut in a 51-14 victory over the Denver Broncos on December 25. In three games with the Rams, Murchison had six tackles (five solo).

During the 2023 season, Murchison played in 15 games with three starts and set a career single-season high in tackles (16), with five pressures, one tackle for loss, and five hurries. Murchison was placed on injured reserve on August 27, 2024. He was activated on October 5, but suffered a broken foot in his first practice back and returned to injured reserve without seeing any game action.

On March 14, 2025, Murchison was re-signed by the Rams on a one-year contract. He played in 16 games, seeing action on 126 defensive snaps and 44 on special teams. He totaled eight tackles, two sacks and three quarterback hits. Murchison was released on January 3, 2026 and re-signed to the practice squad.

On March 23, 2026, the Rams re-signed Murchison on a one-year contract. On August 30, Murchison was released by Los Angeles as a part of final roster cuts; he was re-signed to the team's practice squad the following day. On October 2, Murchison was promoted to the active roster.

== NFL career statistics ==
Legend
| **Bold** | Career high |

=== Regular season ===
| Year | Team | Games | | Tackles | | | | | Interceptions | | | | | | Fumbles | | | | |
| Year | Team | GP | GS | Cmb | Solo | Ast | Sck | TFL | Int | Yds | Avg | Lng | TD | PD | FF | Fum | FR | Yds | TD |
|---|---|---|---|---|---|---|---|---|---|---|---|---|---|---|---|---|---|---|---|
| 2020 | TEN | 10 | 0 | 5 | 1 | 4 | 0.0 | 1 | 0 | 0 | 0.0 | 0 | 0 | 0 | 0 | 0 | 0 | 0 | 0 |
| 2021 | TEN | 11 | **5** | 8 | 4 | 4 | 0.0 | 1 | 0 | 0 | 0.0 | 0 | 0 | 0 | 0 | 0 | 0 | 0 | 0 |
| 2022 | TEN | 5 | 0 | 2 | 1 | 1 | 0.0 | 0 | 0 | 0 | 0.0 | 0 | 0 | 0 | 0 | 0 | 0 | 0 | 0 |
| 2022 | LAR | 3 | 0 | 6 | 5 | 1 | **2.0** | **2** | 0 | 0 | 0.0 | 0 | 0 | 0 | 0 | 0 | 0 | 0 | 0 |
| 2023 | LAR | 15 | 3 | **16** | **7** | **9** | 0.0 | 1 | 0 | 0 | 0.0 | 0 | 0 | 0 | 0 | 0 | 0 | 0 | 0 |
| 2025 | LAR | **16** | 0 | 8 | 2 | 6 | **2.0** | **2** | 0 | 0 | 0.0 | 0 | 0 | 0 | 0 | 0 | 0 | 0 | 0 |
| Career | | 60 | 8 | 45 | 20 | 25 | 4.0 | 7 | 0 | 0 | 0.0 | 0 | 0 | 0 | 0 | 0 | 0 | 0 | 0 |

=== Postseason ===
| Year | Team | Games | | Tackles | | | | | Interceptions | | | | | | Fumbles | | | | |
| Year | Team | GP | GS | Cmb | Solo | Ast | Sck | TFL | Int | Yds | Avg | Lng | TD | PD | FF | Fum | FR | Yds | TD |
|---|---|---|---|---|---|---|---|---|---|---|---|---|---|---|---|---|---|---|---|
| 2020 | TEN | **1** | 0 | **1** | 0 | **1** | 0.0 | 0 | 0 | 0 | 0.0 | 0 | 0 | 0 | 0 | 0 | 0 | 0 | 0 |
| 2023 | LAR | **1** | 0 | 0 | 0 | 0 | 0.0 | 0 | 0 | 0 | 0.0 | 0 | 0 | 0 | 0 | 0 | 0 | 0 | 0 |
| Career | | 2 | 0 | 1 | 0 | 1 | 0.0 | 0 | 0 | 0 | 0.0 | 0 | 0 | 0 | 0 | 0 | 0 | 0 | 0 |
