= Jaylen Twyman =

American football player (born 1999)

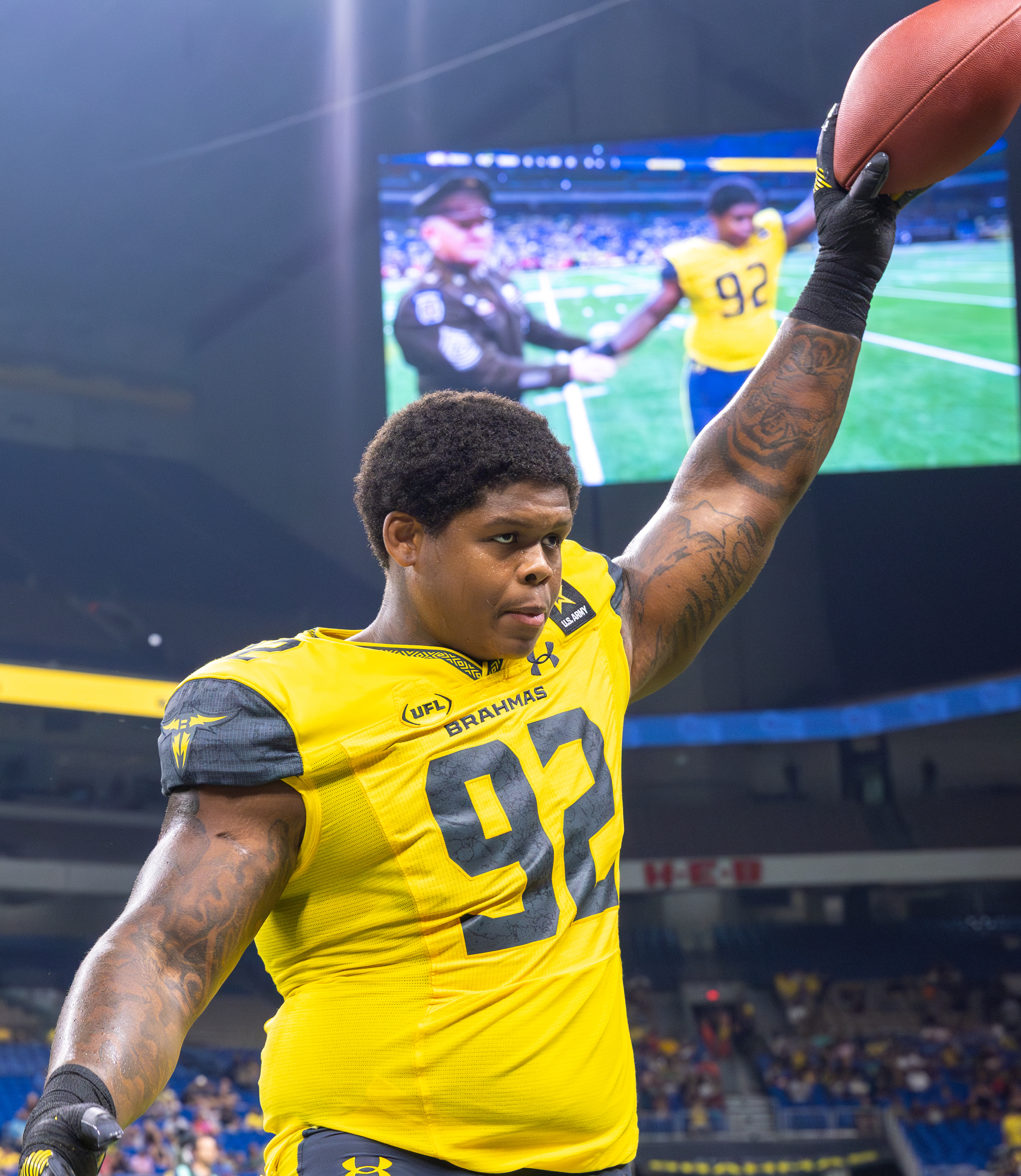
- Twyman with the San Antonio Brahmas in 2024

Profile
- Position: Defensive end

Personal information
- Born: July 19, 1999 (age 27); Washington, D.C., U.S.
- Listed height: 6 ft 2 in (1.88 m)
- Listed weight: 285 lb (129 kg)

Career information
- High school: H. D. Woodson (Washington, D.C.)
- College: Pittsburgh (2017–2020)
- NFL draft: 2021: 6th round, 199th overall pick

Career history
- Minnesota Vikings (2021–2022); Miami Dolphins (2022–2023)*; Birmingham Stallions (2024); San Antonio Brahmas (2024); New York Jets (2024)*; San Antonio Brahmas (2025)*
- * Offseason or practice squad member only

Awards and highlights
- First-team All-ACC (2019)
- Stats at Pro Football Reference

Jaylen Guy Twyman (born July 19, 1999) is an American professional football defensive end. He played college football for the Pittsburgh Panthers and was selected by the Minnesota Vikings in the sixth round of the 2021 NFL draft.

== Early life ==
Twyman attended H. D. Woodson High School in Washington, D.C. As a senior, he had 91 tackles and nine sacks. He committed to the University of Pittsburgh to play college football.

== College career ==
Twyman redshirted his first year at Pittsburgh in 2017. As a redshirt freshman in 2018, he played in 13 games with one start and had 16 tackles and a half sack. Prior to his sophomore season in 2019, Twyman changed his number from 55 to 97 in honor of former Pittsburgh defensive tackle Aaron Donald. That season he started all 13 games, recording 41 tackles and 10.5 sacks.

== Professional career ==
Pre-draft measurables
Height	Weight	Arm length	Hand span	40-yard dash	10-yard split	20-yard split	Three-cone drill	Vertical jump	Broad jump	Bench press
6 ft 1 3/4 in (1.87 m)	301 lb (137 kg)	32 1/8 in (0.82 m)	10 in (0.25 m)	5.39 s	1.74 s	3.19 s	8.00 s	32.5 in (0.83 m)	8 ft 8 in (2.64 m)	40 reps
All values from Pro Day

=== Minnesota Vikings ===
Twyman was selected by the Minnesota Vikings in the sixth round, 199th overall, of the 2021 NFL draft. He signed his four-year rookie contract on May 13, 2021. Twyman was waived by Minnesota with a non-football injury designation on July 26. The next day, he reverted to the team's non-football injury reserve list.

On August 30, 2022, Twyman was waived by the Vikings. He was signed to the practice squad one day later. He was released on October 4.

=== Miami Dolphins ===
On October 10, 2022, Twyman signed with the practice squad of the Miami Dolphins. He signed a reserve/future contract with Miami on January 16, 2023. Twyman was waived by the Dolphins on August 28.

=== Birmingham Stallions ===
On December 24, 2023, Twyman signed with the Birmingham Stallions of the United States Football League (USFL). He was released on April 30, 2024.

=== San Antonio Brahmas (first stint) ===
On May 15, 2024, Twyman signed with the San Antonio Brahmas of the United Football League (UFL). His contract was terminated on August 17, in order to allow him to sign with an NFL team.

=== New York Jets ===
Twyman signed with the New York Jets on August 18, 2024. He was waived by the Jets on August 27.

=== San Antonio Brahmas (second stint) ===
On March 8, 2025, Twyman re-signed with the Brahmas. He was released by the Brahmas on March 20.

== Personal life ==
On June 21, 2021, Twyman suffered four gunshot wounds when bullets hit the car he was riding in while he was visiting family in Washington D.C.
