= Sterling Hofrichter =

American football player (born 1996)

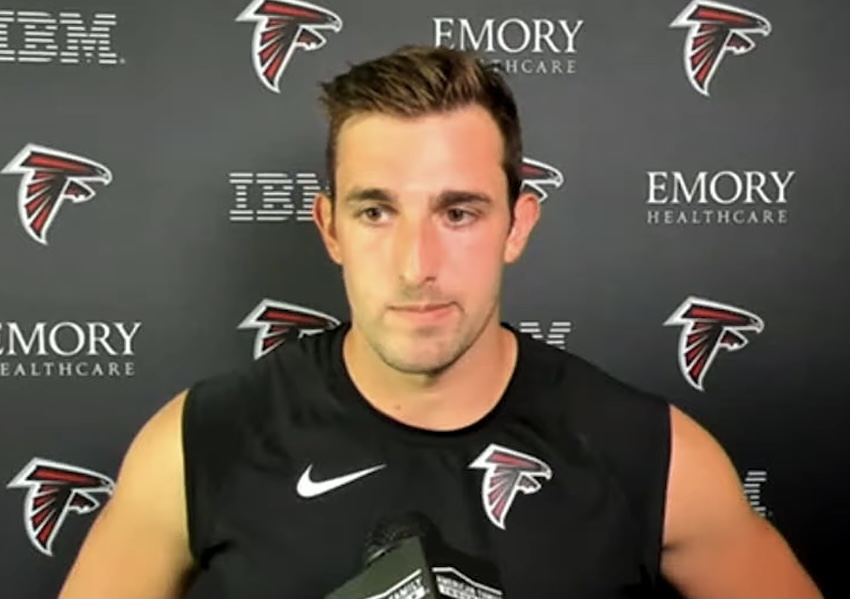
- Hofrichter with the Atlanta Falcons in 2020

Profile
- Position: Punter

Personal information
- Born: December 5, 1996 (age 29); Jacksonville, Florida, U.S.
- Listed height: 5 ft 9 in (1.75 m)
- Listed weight: 196 lb (89 kg)

Career information
- High school: Armwood (Seffner, Florida)
- College: Syracuse (2015–2019)
- NFL draft: 2020: 7th round, 228th overall pick

Career history
- Atlanta Falcons (2020); Tampa Bay Buccaneers (2021); Miami Dolphins (2022)*; St. Louis BattleHawks (2023–2025)
- * Offseason or practice squad member only

Awards and highlights
- Third-team All-American (2019); 2× First-team All-ACC (2018, 2019); Third-team All-ACC (2016)

Career NFL statistics
- Punts: 62
- Punting yards: 2,608
- Average punt: 42.0
- Longest punt: 57
- Inside 20: 20
- Stats at Pro Football Reference

Sterling James Hofrichter (born December 5, 1996) is an American professional football punter. He previously played for the Atlanta Falcons, Tampa Bay Buccaneers, and Miami Dolphins. He played college football at Syracuse.

== Early life ==
Hofrichter attended and played high school football at Armwood High School in Seffner, Florida.

== College career ==
Playing at Syracuse from 2015–2019, Hofrichter mainly lined up at punter, but attempted four field goals and kicked off for two seasons. Over his collegiate career, he totaled 270 punts for 11,651 net yards for a 43.2 average

== Professional career ==
Pre-draft measurables
Height	Weight	Arm length	Hand span
5 ft 9 in (1.75 m)	196 lb (89 kg)	29 3/8 in (0.75 m)	8 5/8 in (0.22 m)
All values from NFL Combine

=== Atlanta Falcons ===
Hofrichter was selected by the Atlanta Falcons in the seventh round with the 228th overall pick in the 2020 NFL draft. On August 3, 2021, he was waived/injured by the Falcons and placed on injured reserve. Hofrichter was released by Atlanta on August 26.

=== Tampa Bay Buccaneers ===
On December 14, 2021, Hofrichter was signed to the practice squad of the Tampa Bay Buccaneers. He was released by Tampa Bay on January 18, 2022. Hofrichter signed a reserve/future contract with the Buccaneers on January 31. He was waived by the team on July 29.

=== Miami Dolphins ===
On August 5, 2022, Hofrichter signed with the Miami Dolphins. He was waived by the Dolphins on August 23.

=== St. Louis BattleHawks ===
On November 18, 2022, Hofrichter was drafted by the St. Louis BattleHawks of the XFL. He re-signed with the team on January 22, 2024, and again on August 16.

Released January 2026.
