= Chris Rumph II =

American football player (born 1998)

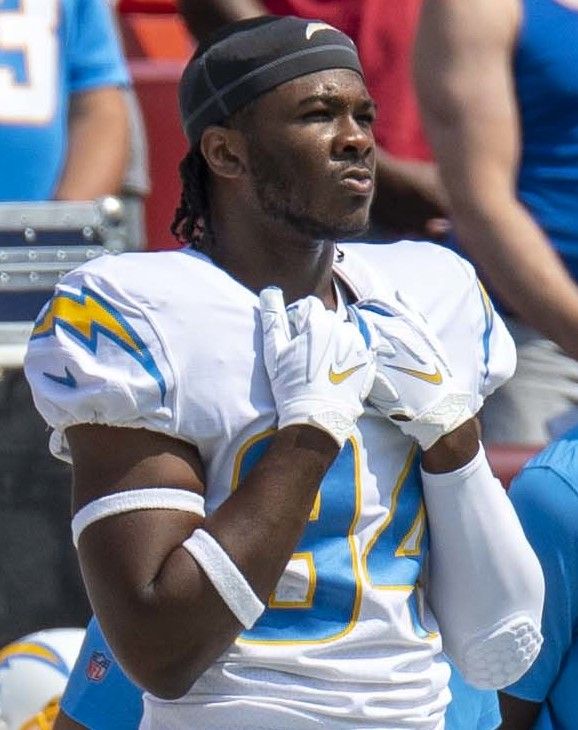
- Rumph with the Los Angeles Chargers in 2021

No. 58 – New Orleans Saints
- Position: Defensive end
- Roster status: Active

Personal information
- Born: October 19, 1998 (age 28); Gainesville, Florida, U.S.
- Listed height: 6 ft 2 in (1.88 m)
- Listed weight: 244 lb (111 kg)

Career information
- High school: Buchholz (Gainesville, Florida)
- College: Duke (2017–2020)
- NFL draft: 2021: 4th round, 118th overall pick

Career history
- Los Angeles Chargers (2021–2024); New Orleans Saints (2025–present)

Awards and highlights
- Second-team All-ACC (2020); Third-team All-ACC (2019)

Career NFL statistics as of 2025
- Tackles: 86
- Sacks: 5
- Forced fumbles: 1
- Pass deflections: 2
- Fumble recoveries: 1
- Stats at Pro Football Reference

Chris Rumph II (born October 19, 1998) is an American professional football defensive end for the New Orleans Saints of the National Football League (NFL). He played college football for the Duke Blue Devils and was drafted by the Los Angeles Chargers in the fourth round of the 2021 NFL draft.

== Early life ==
Rumph moved often during his early life due his father's career as a football coach. He moved to Gainesville, Florida and transferred to Buchholz High School before his sophomore year. As a senior, he was named first-team All-State and the Big School Player of the Year by The Gainesville Sun after recording 105 tackles, 23 tackles for loss, 18 sacks, two blocked punts, one interception and two fumble recoveries. Rumph committed to play college football at Duke over offers from UCF, Vanderbilt, and Appalachian State.

== College career ==
Rumph redshirted his true freshman season. As a redshirt freshman, he recorded 25 tackles, 8.0 tackles for loss, 3.0 sacks, one fumble recovery, and one pass broken up and was named a freshman All-American by USA Today. Rumph posted 47 tackles, 13.5 tackles for loss, 6.5 sacks, three pass breakups, 11 quarterback hurries and one forced fumble and was named third-team All-Atlantic Coast Conference (ACC) and First-team All-America by Pro Football Focus and Second-team All-America by Sports Illustrated.

== Professional career ==
Pre-draft measurables
Height	Weight	Arm length	Hand span	Wingspan	20-yard shuttle	Three-cone drill	Vertical jump	Broad jump	Bench press
6 ft 2 7/8 in (1.90 m)	244 lb (111 kg)	33 3/4 in (0.86 m)	9 1/4 in (0.23 m)	6 ft 8 in (2.03 m)	4.37 s	7.09 s	33.0 in (0.84 m)	9 ft 9 in (2.97 m)	18 reps
All values from Pro Day

=== Los Angeles Chargers ===
Rumph was selected by the Los Angeles Chargers in the fourth round, 118th overall, of the 2021 NFL draft. On May 18, 2021, Rumph signed his four-year rookie contract with the Chargers.

On November 15, 2023, Rumph was placed on injured reserve with a fractured foot.

On August 27, 2024, Rumph was placed on injured reserve, ending his season.

=== New Orleans Saints ===
On April 28, 2025, Rumph signed with the New Orleans Saints on a one-year contract.

On March 19, 2026, Rumph re-signed with the Saints on a one-year, $2 million contract.

== NFL career statistics ==
Legend
**Bold**	Career high

=== Regular season ===
Year	Team	Games		Tackles					Interceptions						Fumbles				
Year	Team	GP	GS	Cmb	Solo	Ast	Sck	TFL	Int	Yds	Avg	Lng	TD	PD	FF	Fum	FR	Yds	TD
2021	LAC	16	0	19	8	11	1.0	2	0	0	0.0	0	0	0	0	0	0	0	0
2022	LAC	15	0	15	7	8	**2.0**	2	0	0	0.0	0	0	**1**	0	0	0	0	0
2023	LAC	6	0	5	4	1	0.0	0	0	0	0.0	0	0	0	0	0	**1**	0	0
2025	NO	17	0	**47**	**24**	**23**	**2.0**	**3**	0	0	0.0	0	0	**1**	**1**	0	0	0	0
Career		54	0	86	43	43	5.0	7	0	0	0.0	0	0	2	1	0	1	0	0

=== Postseason ===
Year	Team	Games		Tackles					Interceptions						Fumbles				
Year	Team	GP	GS	Cmb	Solo	Ast	Sck	TFL	Int	Yds	Avg	Lng	TD	PD	FF	Fum	FR	Yds	TD
2022	LAC	1	0	1	1	0	0.0	0	0	0	0.0	0	0	0	0	0	0	0	0
Career		1	0	1	1	0	0.0	0	0	0	0.0	0	0	0	0	0	0	0	0

== Personal life ==
Rumph's father, Chris Rumph, played linebacker at South Carolina and has coached at the collegiate and professional levels and is currently the defensive line coach for Clemson.
