= John Simpson (American football) =

American football player (born 1997)

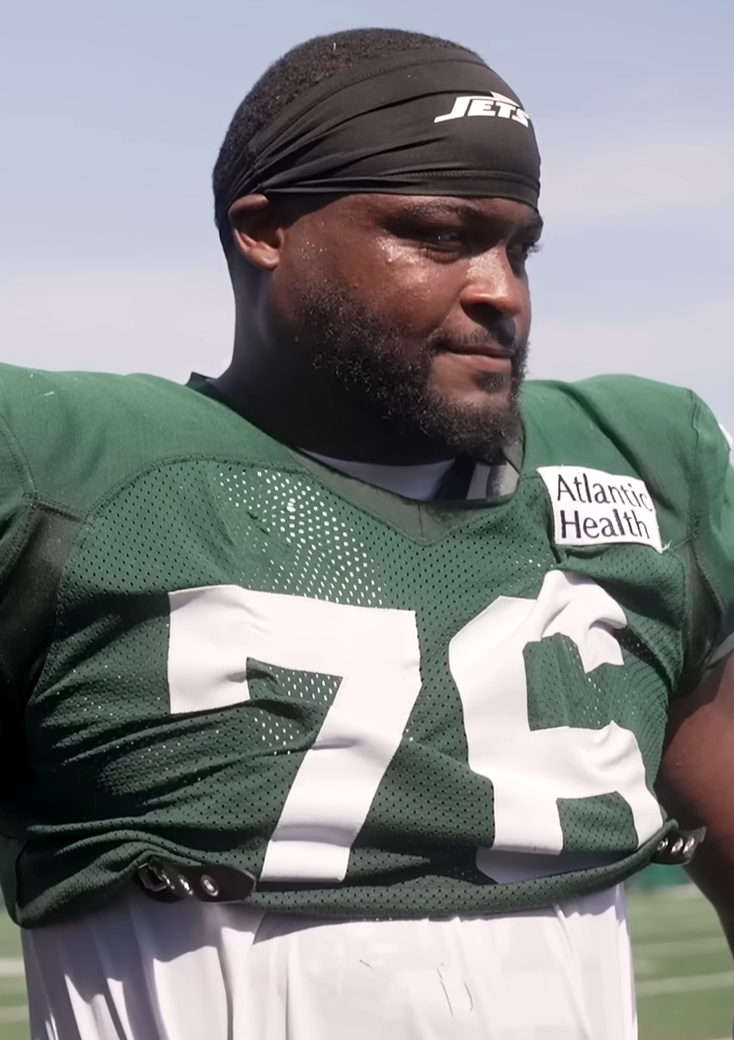
- Simpson with the New York Jets in 2025

No. 74 – Baltimore Ravens
- Position: Offensive guard
- Roster status: Active

Personal information
- Born: August 19, 1997 (age 29); Charleston, South Carolina, U.S.
- Listed height: 6 ft 4 in (1.93 m)
- Listed weight: 330 lb (150 kg)

Career information
- High school: Fort Dorchester (North Charleston, South Carolina)
- College: Clemson (2016–2019)
- NFL draft: 2020: 4th round, 109th overall pick

Career history
- Las Vegas Raiders (2020–2022); Baltimore Ravens (2022–2023); New York Jets (2024–2025); Baltimore Ravens (2026–present)

Awards and highlights
- 2× CFP national champion (2016, 2018); Consensus All-American (2019); First-team All-ACC (2019); Third-team All-ACC (2018)

Career NFL statistics as of 2025
- Games played: 86
- Games started: 72
- Stats at Pro Football Reference

John Simpson (born August 19, 1997) is an American professional football offensive guard for the Baltimore Ravens of the National Football League (NFL). He played college football for the Clemson Tigers.

== Early life ==
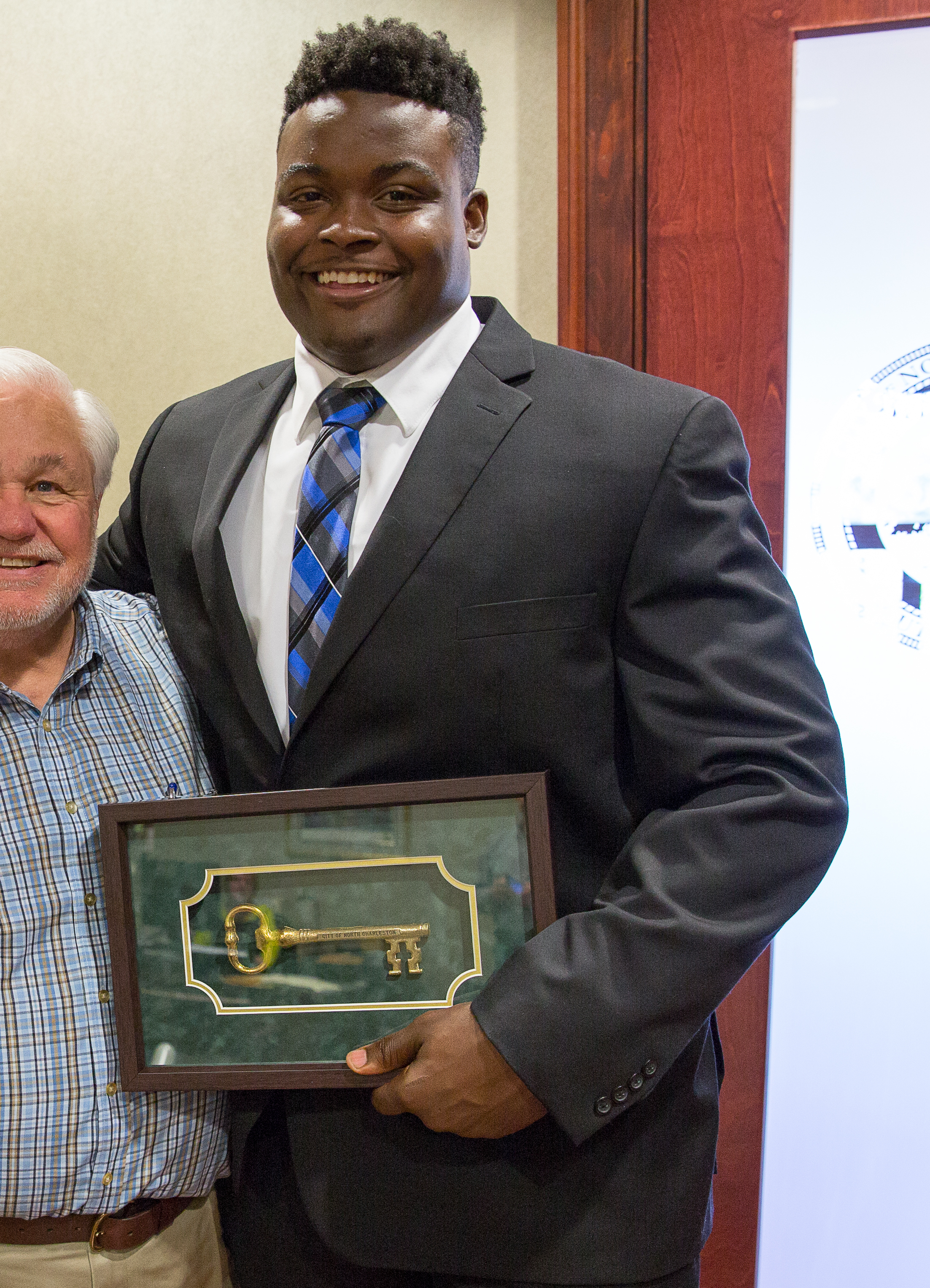
Simpson in 2016

Simpson grew up in the Dorchester-Waylyn neighborhood of North Charleston, South Carolina, where he and his younger brother were raised in a single parent household by his mother, and attended Fort Dorchester High School. Rated a four star prospect, Simpson committed to play college football at Clemson over offers from Florida, LSU, South Carolina and Alabama.

== College career ==
Simpson played in nine games (160 total snaps) as a true freshman on Clemson's 2016 National Championship team, missing multiple weeks due to a foot injury. He appeared in 12 games as a sophomore, playing 300 total snaps of the bench as a key reserve on the Tigers' offensive line. Simpson was named the Tigers' starting left guard going into his junior season. Simpson started all 15 games for the Tigers, playing a total of 858 snaps, as the team won the 2019 College Football Playoff National Championship was named third-team All-Atlantic Coast Conference (ACC) and to the second-team by the Associated Press.

Simpson was chosen by head coach Dabo Swinney to represent Clemson at the ACC's 2019 media day. He gained national coverage by a wearing a blonde wig to imitate the team's starting quarterback, Trevor Lawrence, whom most members of the media had expected to be Clemson's player representative. He was named preseason first-team All-ACC and to the Outland Trophy watchlist entering the season. He was also listed as the second-best offensive guard prospect for the 2020 NFL Draft by ESPN analyst Mel Kiper. Simpson was named a first-team midseason All-American by the Associated Press. Simpson was the only offensive guard to be named a consensus first-team All-American for the 2019 season.

== Professional career ==
Pre-draft measurables
Height	Weight	Arm length	Hand span	Wingspan	40-yard dash	10-yard split	20-yard split	20-yard shuttle	Three-cone drill	Vertical jump	Broad jump	Bench press
6 ft 4 1/8 in (1.93 m)	321 lb (146 kg)	34 1/8 in (0.87 m)	11 1/4 in (0.29 m)	6 ft 10 3/8 in (2.09 m)	5.24 s	1.82 s	3.02 s	4.61 s	8.01 s	30.0 in (0.76 m)	8 ft 11 in (2.72 m)	34 reps
All values from NFL Combine/Pro Day

=== Las Vegas Raiders ===
Simpson was selected by the Las Vegas Raiders in the fourth round, 109th overall, of the 2020 NFL draft. Simpson made his debut on Monday Night Football against the New Orleans Saints on September 21, 2020, entering the game at left guard in the second quarter to replace starter Richie Incognito after he suffered an injury and playing the remainder of the game. He made his first career start the following week on September 27, 2020, against the New England Patriots.

On December 10, 2022, Simpson was waived.

=== Baltimore Ravens (first stint) ===
On December 19, 2022, Simpson was signed to the Baltimore Ravens practice squad. He signed a reserve/future contract on January 16, 2023.

=== New York Jets ===
On March 14, 2024, Simpson signed a two-year contract with the New York Jets. In his two years with the Jets, Simpson started all 34 games at left guard.

=== Baltimore Ravens (second stint) ===
On March 12, 2026, the Baltimore Ravens signed Simpson to a three-year, $30 million contract.

== NFL career statistics ==
Legend
**Bold**	Career high

Year	Team	Games		Offense					
Year	Team	GP	GS	Snaps	Pct	Holding	False start	Decl/Pen	Acpt/Pen
2020	LV	7	2	252	52%	1	1	**2**	2
2021	LV	17	17	1,113	98%	**9**	1	1	**11**
2022	LV	11	2	181	26%	0	0	1	1
2023	BAL	17	17	**1,119**	**99%**	7	**2**	0	**11**
Career		52	38	2,665	-	17	4	4	25
