= Alton Robinson =

American football player (born 1998)

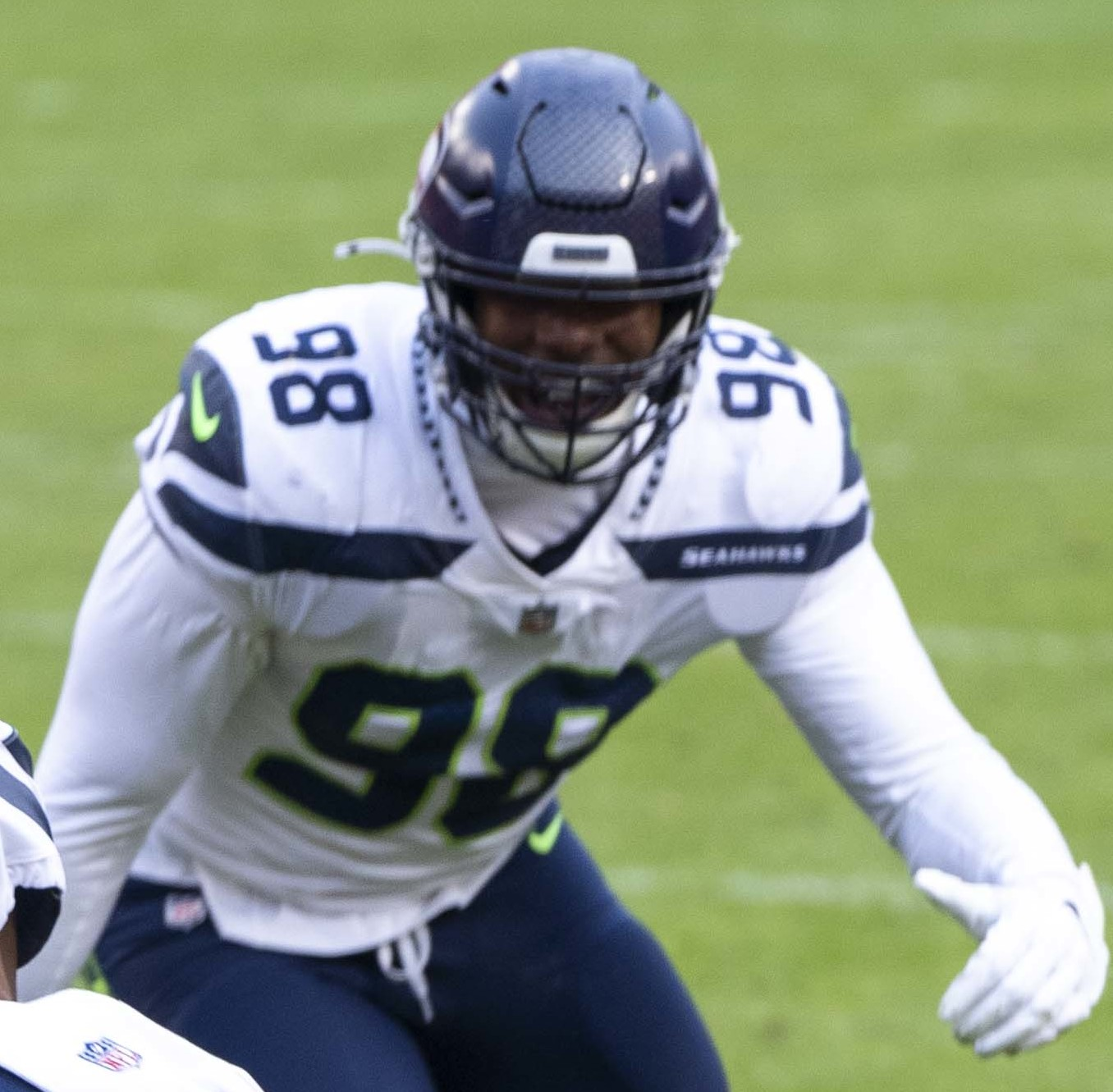
- Robinson with the Seattle Seahawks in 2020

No. 98
- Position: Linebacker

Personal information
- Born: June 2, 1998 (age 28); San Antonio, Texas, U.S.
- Listed height: 6 ft 3 in (1.91 m)
- Listed weight: 259 lb (117 kg)

Career information
- High school: Judson (Converse, Texas)
- College: Northeastern Oklahoma A&M (2016); Syracuse (2017–2019)
- NFL draft: 2020: 5th round, 148th overall pick

Career history
- Seattle Seahawks (2020–2022)

Awards and highlights
- Second-team All-ACC (2018)

Career NFL statistics
- Total tackles: 44
- Sacks: 5
- Forced fumbles: 2
- Pass deflections: 1
- Stats at Pro Football Reference

Alton Ledell Robinson (born June 2, 1998) is an American former professional football player who was a linebacker in the National Football League (NFL). He played college football for the Syracuse Orange.

== Early life ==
Robinson was born in San Antonio, Texas and grew up in Converse, Texas. He attended Judson High School where he was a member of the basketball, football and track & field teams. He recorded 15 sacks and 20 tackles for loss as a junior and was named first-team All-District 25-6A. He committed to play college football for the Texas A&M Aggies over offers from Alabama, Texas, Michigan, Baylor and Oklahoma State after his junior year. As a senior, Robinson recorded 44 tackles, including 23 for a loss, and 12 sacks and was named honorable mention All-State and All-Area by the San Antonio Express-News. Shortly after National Signing Day, Robinson was charged with second-degree felony robbery after being accused of stealing an ex-girlfriend's purse, and eventually, Texas A&M withdrew their scholarship offer. The charges were later downgraded to misdemeanors and ultimately dismissed entirely. After charges were dropped Robinson was close to signing with Oklahoma State, but was unable to due to the Big 12 Conference's misconduct policy.

== College career ==
Robinson began his collegiate career at Northeastern Oklahoma A&M College. In his only season with the Golden Norsemen, he recorded 67 total tackles, 17 tackles for loss and 14 sacks and was named second-team All-Southwest Junior College Football Conference. Following the end of the season Robinson again recruited by Oklahoma State but was not offered a scholarship due to uncertainty regarding the Big 12's moral conduct policy. He committed to transfer to New Mexico State, but he ultimately de-committed in August and opted to sign with Syracuse.

Robinson became a starter at defensive end for the Orange early in his first season with the team and led the team with five sacks and the defensive line with 30 tackles. As a junior, he finished second in the Atlantic Coast Conference (ACC) with 10 sacks along with 39 tackles, 17 tackles for loss and three forced fumbles and was named second-team all-conference. Robinson sat out the team's bowl game for personal reasons. Robinson was named honorable mention All-ACC as a senior after recording 46 tackles, 9.5 tackles for loss, 4.5 sacks and a forced fumble.

== Professional career ==
Pre-draft measurables
Height	Weight	Arm length	Hand span	40-yard dash	20-yard shuttle	Three-cone drill	Vertical jump	Broad jump	Bench press
6 ft 2 3/4 in (1.90 m)	264 lb (120 kg)	32 3/8 in (0.82 m)	9 1/4 in (0.23 m)	4.69 s	4.32 s	7.32 s	35.5 in (0.90 m)	9 ft 11 in (3.02 m)	25 reps
All values from NFL Combine

Robinson was selected by the Seattle Seahawks in the fifth round with the 148th pick in the 2020 NFL draft. In Week 3 against the Dallas Cowboys, Robinson recorded his first career sack on Dak Prescott during the 38–31 win. As a rookie, he had four sacks, 22 tackles, and one forced fumble in 14 games. In the 2021 season, he had one sack, 22 tackles, one pass defended, and one forced fumble in 16 games.

On September 12, 2022, Robinson was placed on injured reserve with a knee injury.

Robinson was released on July 25, 2023.
