= Jason Strowbridge =

American football player (born 1996)

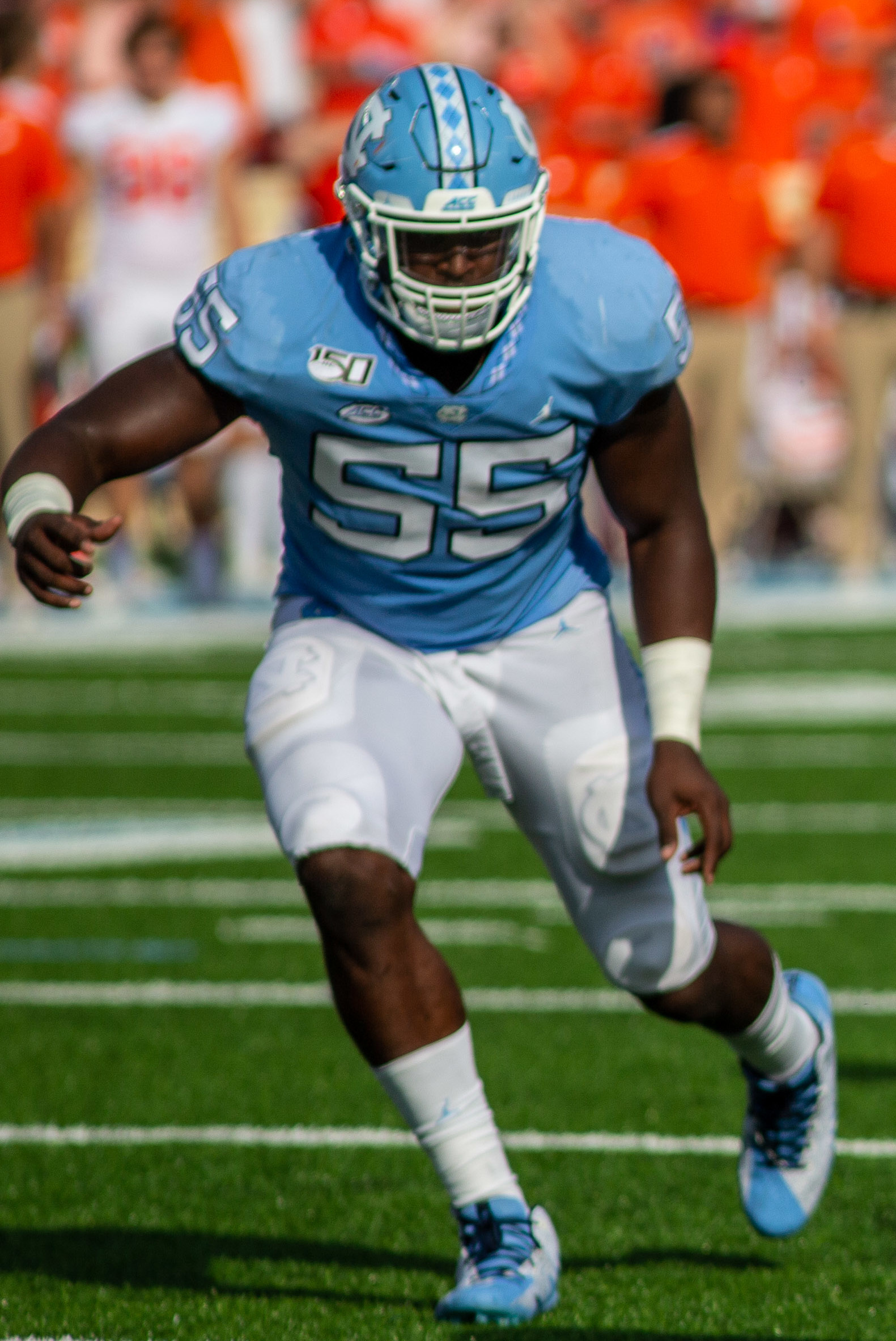
- Strowbridge with the North Carolina Tar Heels in 2019

No. 58
- Position: Defensive end

Personal information
- Born: September 10, 1996 (age 30); Deerfield Beach, Florida, U.S.
- Listed height: 6 ft 5 in (1.96 m)
- Listed weight: 267 lb (121 kg)

Career information
- High school: Deerfield Beach
- College: North Carolina (2015–2019)
- NFL draft: 2020: 5th round, 154th overall pick

Career history
- Miami Dolphins (2020–2021)

Awards and highlights
- Third-team All-ACC (2019)

Career NFL statistics
- Total tackles: 3
- Stats at Pro Football Reference

Jason Strowbridge (born September 10, 1996) is an American former professional football player who was a defensive end in the National Football League (NFL). He played college football for the North Carolina Tar Heels.

== Early life ==
Strowbridge grew up in Deerfield Beach, Florida and attended Deerfield Beach High School. He recorded 12 sacks as a junior. Rated a four-star recruit, Strowbridge initially committed to play college football at the University of Kentucky but eventually changed his commitment to the University of North Carolina at Chapel Hill during his senior year.

== College career ==
Strowbridge redshirted his true freshman season. He played defensive end as a rotational backup and finished the season with 12 tackles, 2.5 tackles for loss and two sacks. Strowbridge moved to defensive tackle and became a starter at the position as a redshirt sophomore and finished the season with 34 tackles, 5.5 tackles for loss, one sack and a forced fumble. He was named honorable mention All-Atlantic Coast Conference (ACC) after recording 36 tackles, 7.5 tackles for loss and 5.5 sacks with a blocked kick in his junior season. As a senior, Strowbridge made 45 tackles (6.5 for loss) with 3.0 sacks and three fumble recoveries and was named third-team All-ACC.

== Professional career ==
Strowbridge was selected in the fifth round of the 2020 NFL draft by the Miami Dolphins. The Dolphins received the 154th pick used to select Strowbridge as a result from a trade that sent Minkah Fitzpatrick to the Pittsburgh Steelers. Strowbridge made his NFL debut on November 8, 2020, against the Arizona Cardinals, playing 12 snaps on defense with one tackle in 34–31 win.

On August 31, 2021, Strowbridge was waived by the Dolphins and re-signed to the practice squad the next day. He was released from the practice squad on September 6.
