= 2019 Independence Bowl =

Postseason college football bowl game

2019 Walk-On's Independence Bowl
- 44th Independence Bowl
Louisiana Tech Bulldogs	Miami Hurricanes
(9–3)	(6–6)
C-USA	ACC
14	0
Head coach: Skip Holtz	Head coach: Manny Diaz
	1	2	3	4	Total
Louisiana Tech	0	7	0	7	14
Miami	0	0	0	0	0
- Date: December 26, 2019
- Season: 2019
- Stadium: Independence Stadium
- Location: Shreveport, Louisiana
- MVP: Justin Henderson (RB, Louisiana Tech) & Connor Taylor (LB, Louisiana Tech)
- Favorite: Miami by 7
- Referee: Scott Campbell (Big 12)
- Attendance: 33,129
- Payout: US$2,200,000

United States TV coverage
- Network: ESPN
- Announcers: Wes Durham (play-by-play), Roddy Jones (analyst) and Eric Wood (sideline)

International TV coverage
- Network: ESPN Brasil
- Announcers: Matheus Suman (play-by-play); Weinny Eirado (analyst)

The 2019 Independence Bowl was a college football bowl game played on December 26, 2019, with kickoff at 4:00 p.m. EST (3:00 p.m. local CST) on ESPN. It was the 44th edition of the Independence Bowl, and one of the 2019–20 bowl games concluding the 2019 FBS football season. Sponsored by Walk-On's Bistreaux & Bar, the game was officially known as the Walk-On's Independence Bowl.

== Teams ==
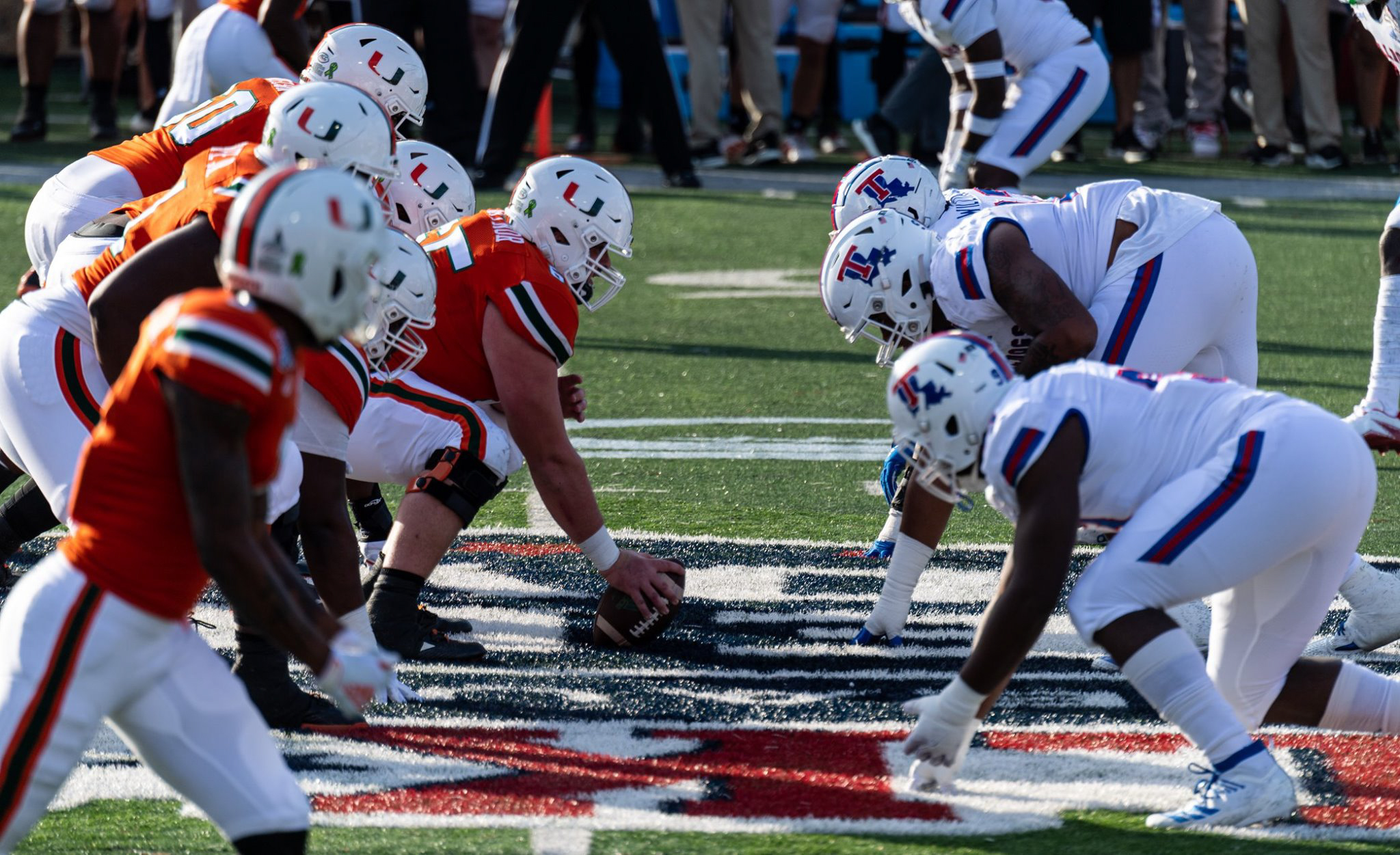
Miami (left in orange jerseys) and Louisiana Tech line up before a snap in the 2019 Independence Bowl, December 2019

The bowl featured the Louisiana Tech Bulldogs of Conference USA (C-USA) against the Miami Hurricanes of the Atlantic Coast Conference (ACC). It was the fifth meeting between the two programs and their first meeting in a bowl game; Miami had won each of their previous four meetings.

=== Louisiana Tech Bulldogs ===
Louisiana Tech entered the bowl with a 9–3 record (6–2 in conference). They were co-champions of the West Division of C-USA; UAB advanced to the C-USA Championship Game due to their regular season win over the Bulldogs. This was Louisiana Tech's fifth Independence Bowl, tying them with Ole Miss for the most appearances in the game. The Bulldogs had a record of 2–1–1 in prior editions of the bowl, most recently with their 2008 team winning that season's Independence Bowl over Northern Illinois, 17–10.

=== Miami Hurricanes ===
Miami entered the bowl at 6–6 (4–4 in conference). They finished in a three-way tie for third place in the Coastal Division of the ACC. The Hurricanes started their regular season with two losses, won six of their next eight games, and then finished with two losses. The 2014 Hurricanes appeared in that season's Independence Bowl, losing to South Carolina, 24–21.

Miami was missing several key players for the game, three due to injury and four due to NFL draft considerations.

== Game summary ==
2019 Walk-On's Independence Bowl

Quarter	1	2	3	4	Total
Louisiana Tech	0	7	0	7	14
Miami	0	0	0	0	0

at Independence Stadium • Shreveport, Louisiana

- Date: Thursday, December 26, 2019
- Game time: 4:00 p.m. EST (3:00 p.m. CST)
- Game weather: Partly cloudy • Temperature: 71 °F (22 °C) • Wind: SE 2 mph
- Game attendance: 33,129
- Referee: Scott Campbell
- TV announcers (ESPN): Wes Durham (play-by-play), Roddy Jones (analyst) and Eric Wood (sideline)
- ESPN game summary

Game information

First Quarter
No scoring
Second Quarter

- (9:34) LT – J'Mar Smith 26-yard pass to Israel Tucker, Bailey Hale kick (Drive: 13 plays, 91 yards, 5:18; Louisiana Tech 7–0)

Third Quarter
No scoring
Fourth Quarter

- (1:15) LT – J'Mar Smith 8 yard rush, Bailey Hale kick (Drive: 5 plays, 56 yards, 2:07; Louisiana Tech 14–0)

The Bulldogs' win made them the first Group of Five team to shut out a Power Five team in a bowl game in either the Bowl Championship Series (1998–2013) or College Football Playoff (2014–present) era.

=== Statistics ===
Statistics	LT	MIA
First downs	18	15
Plays–yards	68–337	62–227
Rushes–yards	40–174	28–74
Passing yards	163	153
Passing: comp–att–int	13–28–1	15–34–2
Time of possession	31:26	28:34

Team	Category	Player	Statistics
Louisiana Tech	Passing	J'Mar Smith	13/28, 163 yards, 1 TD, 1 INT
Louisiana Tech	Rushing	Justin Henderson	22 carries, 95 yards
Louisiana Tech	Receiving	Malik Stanley	3 receptions, 75 yards
Miami	Passing	Jarren Williams	9/20, 94 yards, 1 INT
Miami	Rushing	Cam'Ron Harris	12 carries, 31 yards
Miami	Receiving	K. J. Osborn	5 receptions, 56 yards
