= Manny Diaz (American football) =

Cuban-American football coach (born 1974)

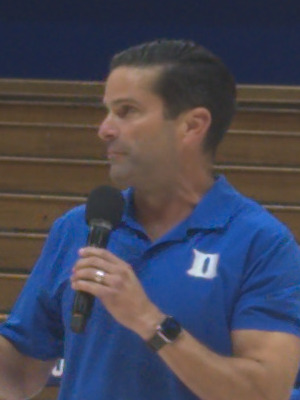
- Diaz in Cameron Indoor Stadium in 2025

Current position
- Title: Head coach
- Team: Duke
- Conference: ACC
- Record: 25–13
- Annual salary: $4 million

Biographical details
- Born: March 13, 1974 (age 52); Miami, Florida, U.S.
- Education: Florida State (1995)

Coaching career (HC unless noted)
- 1998–1999: Florida State (GA)
- 2000–2001: NC State (GA)
- 2002–2003: NC State (LB)
- 2004–2005: NC State (S/ST)
- 2006–2007: Middle Tennessee (DC/S)
- 2008–2009: Middle Tennessee (DC/LB)
- 2010: Mississippi State (DC/LB)
- 2011–2013: Texas (DC/LB)
- 2014: Louisiana Tech (DC/LB)
- 2015: Mississippi State (DC/LB)
- 2016–2018: Miami (FL) (DC)
- 2019–2021: Miami (FL)
- 2022–2023: Penn State (DC/LB)
- 2024–present: Duke

Head coaching record
- Overall: 46–28
- Bowls: 1–3

Accomplishments and honors

Championships
- ACC (2025)

Manuel Alberto Diaz II (born March 13, 1974) is an American football coach who is the head football coach at Duke University. He served as the defensive coordinator and linebackers coach at Penn State from 2022 to 2023 and as the head football coach at the University of Miami from 2019 to 2021. Diaz previously worked as an assistant football coach at Mississippi State, Louisiana Tech, Texas, Middle Tennessee State, NC State, and Florida State.

== Early life ==
Diaz, son of former Miami mayor Manny Diaz, was born on March 13, 1974. At Miami Country Day School, Diaz was a three sport athlete in football, basketball and baseball. In 1991, Diaz was a Miami Herald honorable mention All-Dade County Scholar-Athlete for football, basketball and baseball. Diaz is a graduate of Florida State University, where he joined the Gamma Rho chapter of Theta Chi fraternity. After college, Diaz served as a production assistant at ESPN. The last highlight reel he cut was the 1997 Masters.

== Coaching career ==
=== Florida State ===
Diaz began his coaching career as a graduate assistant at Florida State University in 1998, working alongside defensive coordinator Mickey Andrews for two seasons. During his stint, the Florida State Seminoles appeared in back-to-back BCS National Championship Games, a loss to the Tennessee Volunteers in the 1999 Fiesta Bowl and a win against the Virginia Tech Hokies in the 2000 Sugar Bowl.

=== NC State ===
Diaz played a major role for one of the country's top-ranked defenses by coaching safeties in 2004 and 2005 and handling the linebackers in 2002 and 2003 for the NC State Wolfpack.

The 2005 NC State Wolfpack football team finished eighth nationally in total defense, sixth in third-down percentage, and twelfth in scoring defense en route to a 7–5 record and a shutout win over the South Florida Bulls in the 2005 Meineke Car Care Bowl. Diaz also served as special teams coordinator and the kickoff return unit finished fifth nationally, while the punt return team blocked four kicks.

In his first year as safeties coach and special teams coordinator in 2004, NC State's defense finished the year as the top-ranked unit in the country in total defense by allowing just over 220 yards per game. The Wolfpack defense also held national powers Ohio State and Florida State to under 130 yards of total offense during the season. Diaz's players included All-ACC performer and former New York Jets player Andre Maddox. His 2004 special teams at NC State also had three blocked punts and two returns for touchdowns.

Diaz handled the linebackers for NC State in 2002 and 2003. The 2003 NC State Wolfpack football team finished 7–5 with Diaz sharing play-calling duties for all 11 games. He also made all the defensive calls during the 2003 Tangerine Bowl win over the Kansas Jayhawks.

In 2002, his first year as a full-time coach, Diaz helped the Wolfpack to one of their best seasons ever, finishing 11–3 and defeating Notre Dame in the Gator Bowl. He shared in the play-calling duties, and NC State ended the year ranked 14th nationally in total defense and 10th in scoring defense. In back-to-back games against Florida State and Notre Dame, NC State did not allow an offensive touchdown.

=== Middle Tennessee ===
Diaz spent four seasons as defensive coordinator at Middle Tennessee State University. Diaz also coached linebackers for two years after mentoring the safeties during his first two seasons in Murfreesboro.

In four years under Diaz, the Middle Tennessee defense led its conference in sacks and tackles for loss twice, and finished no lower than third in the league in either category during his tenure. In 2009, the Blue Raiders finished second nationally in tackles for loss, stopping more than eight and a half plays per game behind the line of scrimmage. Diaz's defense also ranked sixth nationally in sacks that season, posting nearly three per game.

Also in 2009, Diaz tutored defensive end Chris McCoy who was tabbed the Sun Belt Conference co-Defensive Player of the Year. McCoy led the league and ranked sixth nationally in tackles for loss. Safety Jeremy Kellem and cornerbacks Alex Suber and Marcus Udell were also named first team all-SBC. Defensive end Jamari Lattimore along with linebackers Cam Robinson and Danny Carmichael earned second-team honors. Overall, Diaz' unit produced 17 all-conference players during his time there and put up three of the top four fewest yards allowed averages at Middle Tennessee in its FBS era.

=== Mississippi State ===
In 2010 with the Mississippi State Bulldogs, Diaz guided a defense that ranked 22nd in the nation in scoring defense (19.9 ppg), 17th in rushing defense (214.9 ypg) and 17th in tackles for loss (7.0 pg). That was a dramatic turnaround for MSU from the season prior to his arrival. In 2009, the defense finished 71st in scoring defense, 62nd in rushing defense and 89th in TFL. Mississippi State also finished ranked 13th in red zone defense (.73) and 22nd in turnovers forced (28) nationally this season.

=== Texas ===
Diaz was introduced as the defensive coordinator for the Texas Longhorns in January 2011. During his first season at Texas, Diaz led the top defense in the Big 12 as the Longhorns ranked first in the conference in total defense, rushing defense and pass defense. Overall the unit ranked 11th nationally in total defense and was sixth against the run despite facing six offenses that ranked in the top 15 nationally.

On September 7, 2013, the Longhorns' defense, under Diaz, gave up a school record 550 yards rushing to Brigham Young University, including 257 to quarterback Taysom Hill. The following day, Mack Brown described the defensive performance as "unacceptable" and relieved Diaz of his duties as defensive coordinator.

=== Louisiana Tech ===
On January 21, 2014, Louisiana Tech hired Diaz as its defensive coordinator under head coach Skip Holtz. Diaz succeeded Kim Dameron, who had departed after a single season to become head coach at Eastern Illinois. In Diaz's lone season as defensive coordinator at Louisiana Tech, the Bulldogs led FBS in turnovers gained (42) with 16 fumble recoveries and 26 interceptions.

=== Second stint at Mississippi State ===
On January 5, 2015, it was announced that Diaz would return to Mississippi State as defensive coordinator. Diaz spent the 2015 season with the Bulldogs, where his unit held opponents to 23.2 points per game and ranked in the nation’s top 10 in red zone defense and tackles for loss.

=== Miami ===
On January 2, 2016, University of Miami football head coach Mark Richt named Miami native Manny Diaz as the Hurricanes’ defensive coordinator for the start of the 2016 campaign. In his first season at Miami, Diaz was a nominee for the Broyles Award, given to the top assistant coach in college football. Diaz spent three seasons as the defensive coordinator under Richt. In his first year at the helm of the defense, Diaz's unit ranked No. 20 nationally in total defense, No. 9 in yards per play, No. 12 in scoring defense, No. 5 in tackles for loss, No. 22 in team sacks and tied for No. 8 in defensive touchdowns allowed. Miami was the only team in the country to start three true freshmen linebackers in 2016.

Diaz is considered the mastermind behind the "Turnover Chain," a Cuban link chain with a charm in the shape of the school's iconic "U" logo, designed by famed Miami jeweler Anthony John Machado, more commonly known as "A.J. The Jeweler." Miami appeared in the 2017 Capital One Orange Bowl. Continuing the impressive trends from Diaz’s first year running the defense, the Hurricanes ranked among the nation’s leaders in several defensive categories in 2017, including first nationally in team sacks, third nationally in tackles for loss and ninth nationally in opponent yards per play.

In his final season as defensive coordinator in 2018, the Hurricanes ranked No. 4 in NCAA in total defense and ranked No. 1 in several categories, including tackles for loss, third down conversion percentage and passing yards allowed. Diaz and his staff also unveiled the second "Turnover Chain" in Miami's home opener against Savannah State. Also designed by A.J. The Jeweler, Turnover Chain 2.0 featured a charm in the shape of Sebastian the Ibis, the school's mascot.

=== Temple ===
On December 13, 2018, Diaz was named the 28th head football coach at Temple University, replacing Geoff Collins, who left to become the head coach at Georgia Tech. However, he left the team just two weeks later to return to Miami and was named head football coach on December 30, 2018. Diaz apologized for the circumstances and said "I hate the way this unfolded with respect to Temple...I was given a tremendous opportunity to lead the Temple program and...I do hope that the Temple players, administration and fans appreciate the uniqueness of this situation and the overwhelming pull to stay home."

=== Return to Miami ===
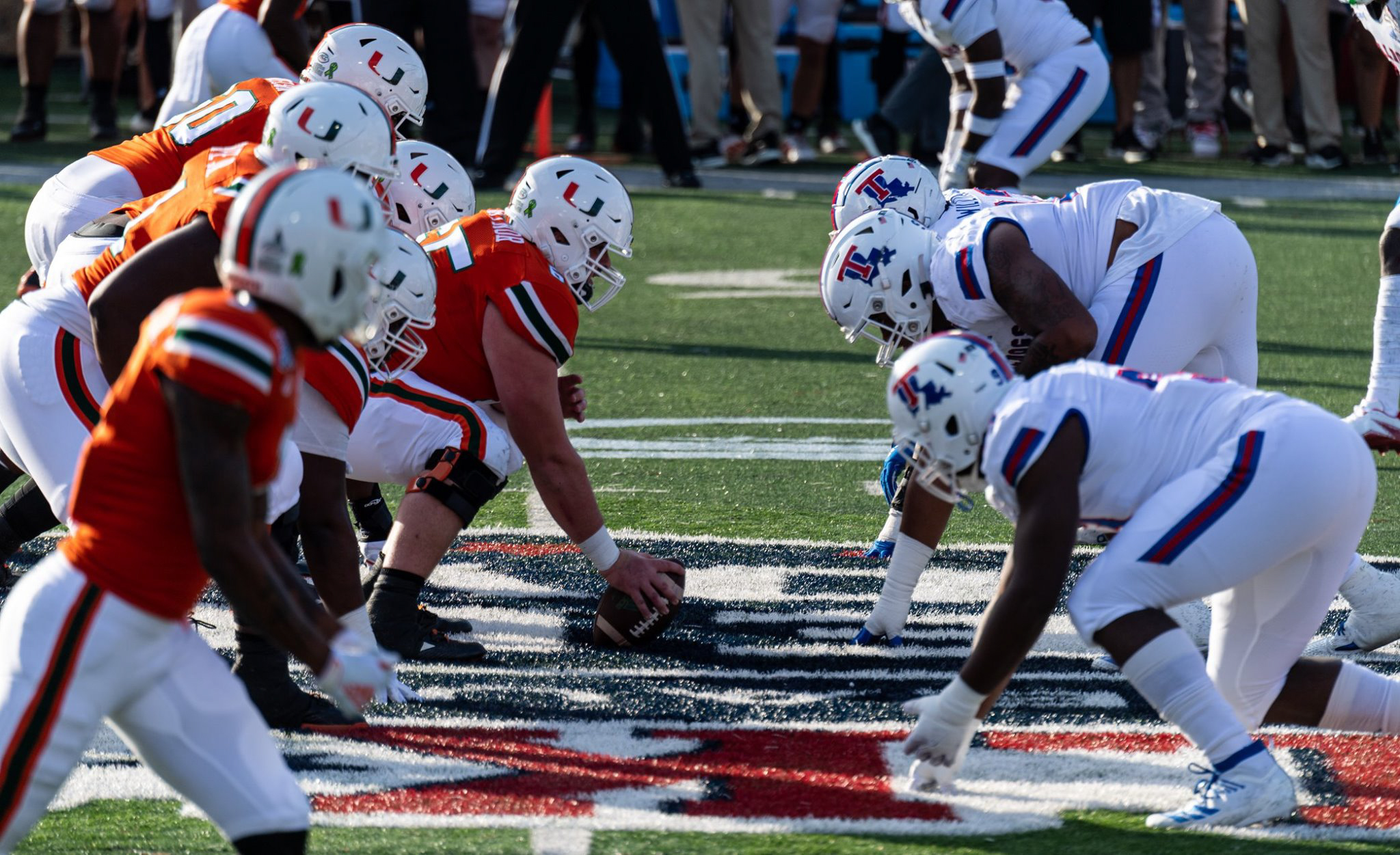
Diaz's Miami Hurricanes (left in orange jerseys) take on Louisiana Tech in the 2019 Independence Bowl in Shreveport, Louisiana, December 2019

After Mark Richt's retirement on December 30, 2018, Diaz was hired as head coach at the University of Miami. He was introduced at a press conference on January 2, 2019.

In three seasons, Diaz posted a 21–15 record. In his third season, Miami was ranked in the Top 15 of the Associated Press poll but stumbled to a 2–4 start. Although the team recovered to finish 7–5, media speculated Diaz was in danger of losing his job. On December 6, 2021, Miami fired him.

=== Penn State ===
On December 11, 2021, Diaz was hired to be the defensive coordinator and linebackers coach at Penn State University under head coach James Franklin. Diaz replaced long-time defensive coordinator Brent Pry after his departure to become head coach at Virginia Tech. Under Diaz, Penn St’s defense ranked 2nd in the country in total defense. Diaz was named a semi-finalist for the 2023 Broyles Award.

=== Duke ===
On December 7, 2023, Diaz was named the 23rd head coach at Duke University.

On December 6, 2025, Diaz and Duke won the ACC championship in overtime over Virginia, 27–20.

On December 31, 2025, Diaz and the ACC Champion Duke Blue Devils won the Sun Bowl over Arizona State, 42–39, in front of 44,975 fans to become the 92nd Tony The Tiger Sun Bowl champions.

== Personal life ==
Diaz and his wife, Stephanie, have three sons, Colin, Gavin and Manny. His father Manuel Diaz formerly served as the mayor of Miami, FL and chair of the Florida Democratic Party.

== Head coaching record ==
Year	Team	Overall	Conference	Standing	Bowl/playoffs	Coaches^{#}	AP^{°}
Miami Hurricanes (Atlantic Coast Conference) (2019–2021)
2019	Miami	6–7	4–4	T–3rd (Coastal)	L Independence		
2020	Miami	8–3	7–2	3rd	L Cheez-It	22	22
2021	Miami	7–5	5–3	2nd (Coastal)	Sun (Note: Miami fired Diaz before the bowl game. And the Hurricanes opted out of the game.)		
Miami:		21–15	16–9				
Duke Blue Devils (Atlantic Coast Conference) (2024–present)
2024	Duke	9–4	5–3	T–4th	L Gator		
2025	Duke	9–5	6–2	T–2nd	W Sun		
2026	Duke	7–4	4–4				
Duke:		25–13	15–9				
Total:		46–28					
National championship Conference title Conference division title or championship game berth
