= 2019 Miami Hurricanes football team =

American college football season

2019 Miami Hurricanes football

Independence Bowl, L 0–14 vs. Louisiana Tech
- Conference: Atlantic Coast Conference
- Coastal Division
- Record: 6–7 (4–4 ACC)
- Head coach: Manny Diaz (1st season)
- Offensive coordinator: Dan Enos (1st season)
- Offensive scheme: Pro spread
- Defensive coordinator: Blake Baker (1st season)
- Co-defensive coordinator: Ephraim Banda (1st season)
- Base defense: Multiple
- Home stadium: Hard Rock Stadium

Uniform
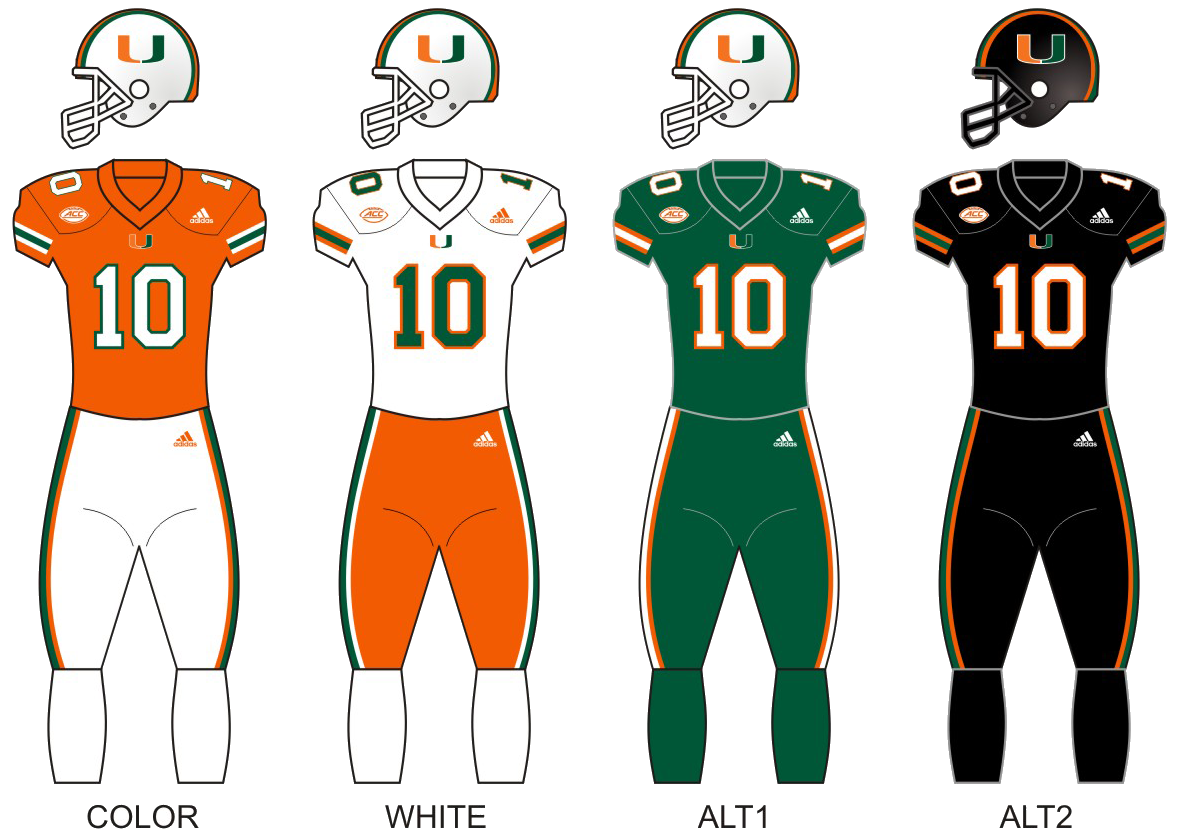

2019 Atlantic Coast Conference football standings
	Conf.			Overall
Team	W		L	W		L
Atlantic Division
No. 2 Clemson xy$^	8	–	0	14	–	1
Louisville	5	–	3	8	–	5
Wake Forest	4	–	4	8	–	5
Boston College	4	–	4	6	–	7
Florida State	4	–	4	6	–	7
Syracuse	2	–	6	5	–	7
NC State	1	–	7	4	–	8
Coastal Division
Virginia x	6	–	2	9	–	5
Virginia Tech	5	–	3	8	–	5
Pittsburgh	4	–	4	8	–	5
North Carolina	4	–	4	7	–	6
Miami (FL)	4	–	4	6	–	7
Duke	3	–	5	5	–	7
Georgia Tech	2	–	6	3	–	9
Championship: Clemson 62, Virginia 17
^ – College Football Playoff participant; $ – Conference champion; x – Division champion/co-champions; Rankings from AP Poll

The 2019 Miami Hurricanes football team (variously "Miami", "The U", "UM", "'Canes") represented the University of Miami during the 2019 NCAA Division I FBS football season. The Hurricanes were led by first-year head coach Manny Diaz and played their home games at Hard Rock Stadium, competing as a member of the Coastal Division of the Atlantic Coast Conference (ACC).

For the first time since the 2007 season, the Hurricanes were not ranked in the AP Top 25 in any week of the season, and ended up finishing with their first losing season since 2007.

== Preseason ==
=== Preseason media poll ===
In the preseason ACC media poll, Miami was predicted to finish in second in the Coastal Division.

== Schedule ==
Date	Time	Opponent	Site	TV	Result	Attendance
August 24	7:00 p.m.	vs. No. 8 Florida*	Camping World Stadium; Orlando, FL (Camping World Kickoff / Florida Cup / rivalry / College GameDay / SEC Nation)	ESPN	L 20–24	66,543
September 7	8:00 p.m.	at North Carolina	Kenan Memorial Stadium; Chapel Hill, NC	ACCN	L 25–28	50,500
September 14	4:00 p.m.	Bethune–Cookman*	Hard Rock Stadium; Miami Gardens, FL	ACCN	W 63–0	52,036
September 21	4:00 p.m.	Central Michigan*	Hard Rock Stadium; Miami Gardens, FL	ACCN	W 17–12	49,997
October 5	3:30 p.m.	Virginia Tech	Hard Rock Stadium; Miami Gardens, FL (rivalry)	ESPN	L 35–42	53,183
October 11	8:00 p.m.	No. 20 Virginia	Hard Rock Stadium; Miami Gardens, FL	ESPN	W 17–9	54,538
October 19	12:00 p.m.	Georgia Tech	Hard Rock Stadium; Miami Gardens, FL	ACCN	L 21–28 ^{OT}	54,106
October 26	12:00 p.m.	at Pittsburgh	Heinz Field; Pittsburgh, PA	ESPN	W 16–12	47,918
November 2	3:30 p.m.	at Florida State	Doak Campbell Stadium; Tallahassee, FL (Florida Cup / rivalry)	ABC	W 27–10	63,995
November 9	3:30 p.m.	Louisville^{†}	Hard Rock Stadium; Miami Gardens, FL (rivalry)	ESPN2	W 52–27	53,111
November 23	7:00 p.m.	at FIU*	Marlins Park; Miami, FL	CBSSN	L 24–30	27,339
November 30	3:30 p.m.	at Duke	Wallace Wade Stadium; Durham, NC	ESPN2	L 17–27	15,913
December 26	4:00 p.m.	vs. Louisiana Tech*	Independence Stadium; Shreveport, LA (Independence Bowl)	ESPN	L 0–14	33,129
*Non-conference game; ^{†}Homecoming; Rankings from AP Poll and CFP Rankings after November 5 released prior to game; All times are in Eastern time

== Roster ==
2019 Miami Hurricanes football team roster
Players
Coaches
Offense

Pos.	#	Name	Class
RB	1	Lorenzo Lingard	So
WR	2	K. J. Osborn	Sr
WR	3	Mike Harley Jr.	Jr
WR	4	Jeff Thomas	Jr
QB	5	N'Kosi Perry	So
WR	6	Mark Pope	So
WR	8	Dee Wiggins	So
TE	9	Brevin Jordan	So
QB	11	Carson Proctor	Jr
WR	12	Jeremiah Payton	Fr
RB	13	DeeJay Dallas	Jr
QB	15	Jarren Williams	Fr
QB	16	Ryan Rizk	Fr
QB	17	Peyton Matocha	Fr
QB	18	Tate Martell	So
RB	22	Robert Burns	So
RB	23	Cam'Ron Harris	So
WR	27	Marshall Few	Jr
RB	29	Jimmy Murphy	Sr
WR	31	Connor Byrne	Jr
WR	34	Elias Lugo-Fagundo	So
WR	39	Dante Johnson	Jr
WR	40	Will Huggins	Fr
FB	41	Michael Parrott	So
RB	43	Isaiah Cashwell	So
TE	46	Nicholas Ducheine	Jr
WR	47	Mykel Tubbs	Fr
TE	48	Robert Prosek	Fr
OL	51	D. J. Scaife Jr.	So
OL	53	Jakai Clark	Fr
OL	55	Navaughn Donaldson	Jr
OL	57	Kai-Leon Herbert	So
OL	60	Zion Nelson	Fr
OL	65	Corey Gaynor	So
OL	66	Ousman Traore	So
OL	67	Zach Dykstra	So
OL	71	Jared Griffith	Fr
OL	72	Tommy Kennedy	Sr
OL	74	John Campbell Jr.	Fr
OL	75	Zalon'Tae Hillery	So
OL	77	Adam Elgammal	Fr
TE	81	Larry Hodges	Fr
WR	82	Jarius Howard	Fr
TE	85	Will Mallory	So
TE	87	Michael Irvin II	Jr
TE	88	Brian Polendey	So

Defense

Pos.	#	Name	Class
DL	1	Nesta Jade Silvera	So
CB	2	Trajan Bandy	Jr
S	3	Gilbert Frierson	Fr
S	4	Keontra Smith	Fr
S	5	Amari Carter	Jr
LB	6	Sam Brooks Jr.	Fr
CB	7	Al Blades Jr.	So
CB	8	D. J. Ivey	So
LB	9	Avery Huff	Fr
DL	12	Jahfari Harvey	Fr
DL	15	Gregory Rousseau	Fr
LB	17	Waynmon Steed	So
S	20	Robert Knowles	Sr
S	21	Bubba Bolden	So
DL	22	Cameron Williams	Fr
CB	23	Te'Corey Couch	Fr
CB	24	Christian Williams	Fr
S	26	Gurvan Hall Jr.	So
S	30	Romeo Finley	Sr
S	34	Ryan Ragone	Fr
LB	35	Zac Smith	Fr
S	36	Andrew Barnes	Fr
LB	37	Colvin Alford	So
CB	38	Robert Brand	So
S	39	Gannon Feldmann	Fr
CB	40	Luis Gutierrez Jr.	Fr
LB	44	Bradley Jennings Jr.	So
LB	45	Bryan Levine	Fr
CB	46	Suleman Burrows	Fr
LB	48	Jake Hoffman	Fr
DL	49	Shawn Walker	Jr
LB	52	Patrick Joyner Jr.	Fr
LB	53	Zach McCloud	Sr
LB	55	Shaquille Quarterman	Sr
LB	56	Michael Pinckney	Sr
DL	68	Michael Scibelli	Fr
DL	70	Earnest Carter	So
DL	71	Scott Patchan	Sr
DL	81	Jared Harrison-Hunte	Fr
DL	84	Josh Neely	Fr
DL	90	Tyreic Martin	Jr
DL	91	Jordan Miller	Fr
DL	92	Jason Blissett Jr.	Fr
DL	93	Pat Bethel	Sr
DL	94	Trevon Hill	Sr
DL	95	Jaelan Phillips	So
DL	96	Jonathan Ford	Jr
DL	97	Jonathan Garvin	Jr
DL	98	Jalar Holley	Fr
DL	99	Chigozie Nnoruka	Sr

Special teams

Pos.	#	Name	Class
P	19	Jack Spicer	Sr
K	21	Bubba Baxa	So
K	45	Camden Price	Fr
K	47	Turner Davidson	So
LS	49	Mason Napper	Fr
LS	58	Clay James	Fr
LS	59	Alan Nadelsticher	Fr
LS	61	Jacob Munoz	Jr
P	94	Lou Hedley	So

Head coach

- Manny Diaz

Coordinators/assistant coaches

{{{asst_coach}}}

Legend

- (C) Team captain
- (S) Suspended
- (I) Ineligible
- Injured
- Redshirt

== Personnel ==
=== Coaching staff ===
Manny Diaz	Head coach	Florida State (1995)
Dan Enos	Offensive coordinator/quarterbacks	Michigan State (1991)
Blake Baker	Defensive coordinator	Tulane (2004)
Ephraim Banda	Co-defensive coordinator/safeties	Incarnate Word (2012)
Todd Stroud	Assistant head coach / defensive line	Florida State (1985)
Jonathan Patke	Outside linebackers/special teams	Stephen F. Austin (2008)
Butch Barry	Offensive line	Central Michigan (2001)
Stephen Field	Tight ends	Tuskegee
Eric Hickson	Running backs	Kansas State (1998)
Mike Rumph	Cornerbacks coach	Miami (2002)
Taylor Stubblefield	Wide receivers	Purdue (2005)

== Game summaries ==
=== Vs. Florida ===
	1	2	3	4	Total
Hurricanes	3	10	0	7	20
No. 8 Gators^	7	0	10	7	24

^Neutral site game at Camping World Stadium in Orlando. The Gators are the designated home team.

Scoring summary

Quarter	Time	Drive			Team	Scoring information	Score	
Quarter	Time	Plays	Yards	TOP	Team	Scoring information	Miami	Florida
1	9:37	9	56	5:23	Miami	36-yard field goal by Bubba Baxa	3	0
1	7:37	5	79	2:00	Florida	Kadarius Toney 66-yard touchdown reception from Feleipe Franks, Evan McPherson kick good	3	7
2	8:26	5	27	2:20	Miami	42-yard field goal by Bubba Baxa	6	7
2	0:45	12	90	6:08	Miami	Brevin Jordan 25-yard touchdown reception from Jarren Williams, Bubba Baxa kick good	13	7
3	6:30	9	33	3:25	Florida	27-yard field goal by Evan McPherson	13	10
3	0:30	3	11	0:43	Florida	Lamical Perine 8-yard touchdown reception from Feleipe Franks, Evan McPherson kick good	13	17
4	14:15	3	75	1:15	Miami	DeeJay Dallas 50-yard touchdown run, Bubba Baxa kick good	20	17
4	8:18	4	80	1:30	Florida	Feleipe Franks 3-yard touchdown run, Evan McPherson kick good	20	24
"TOP" = time of possession. For other American football terms, see Glossary of American football.							20	24

=== At North Carolina ===
	1	2	3	4	Total
Hurricanes	3	10	6	6	25
Tar Heels	17	0	3	8	28

=== Bethune–Cookman ===
	1	2	3	4	Total
Wildcats	0	0	0	0	0
Hurricanes	7	21	14	21	63

=== Central Michigan ===
	1	2	3	4	Total
Chippewas	0	2	3	7	12
Hurricanes	7	0	7	3	17

=== Virginia Tech ===
	1	2	3	4	Total
Hokies	21	7	0	14	42
Hurricanes	0	7	7	21	35

=== Virginia ===
	1	2	3	4	Total
Cavaliers	0	3	0	6	9
Hurricanes	7	0	0	10	17

=== Georgia Tech ===
	1	2	3	4	OT	Total
Yellow Jackets	14	7	0	0	7	28
Hurricanes	14	7	0	0	0	21

=== At Pittsburgh ===
	1	2	3	4	Total
Hurricanes	3	7	0	6	16
Panthers	3	3	3	3	12

=== At Florida State ===
	1	2	3	4	Total
Hurricanes	7	10	0	10	27
Seminoles	0	3	7	0	10

=== Louisville ===
	1	2	3	4	Total
Cardinals	7	7	7	6	27
Hurricanes	21	14	17	0	52

=== At FIU ===
	1	2	3	4	Total
Hurricanes	0	0	3	21	24
Panthers	10	3	3	14	30

=== At Duke ===
	1	2	3	4	Total
Hurricanes	0	14	3	0	17
Blue Devils	3	10	0	14	27

=== vs Louisiana Tech (Independence Bowl) ===
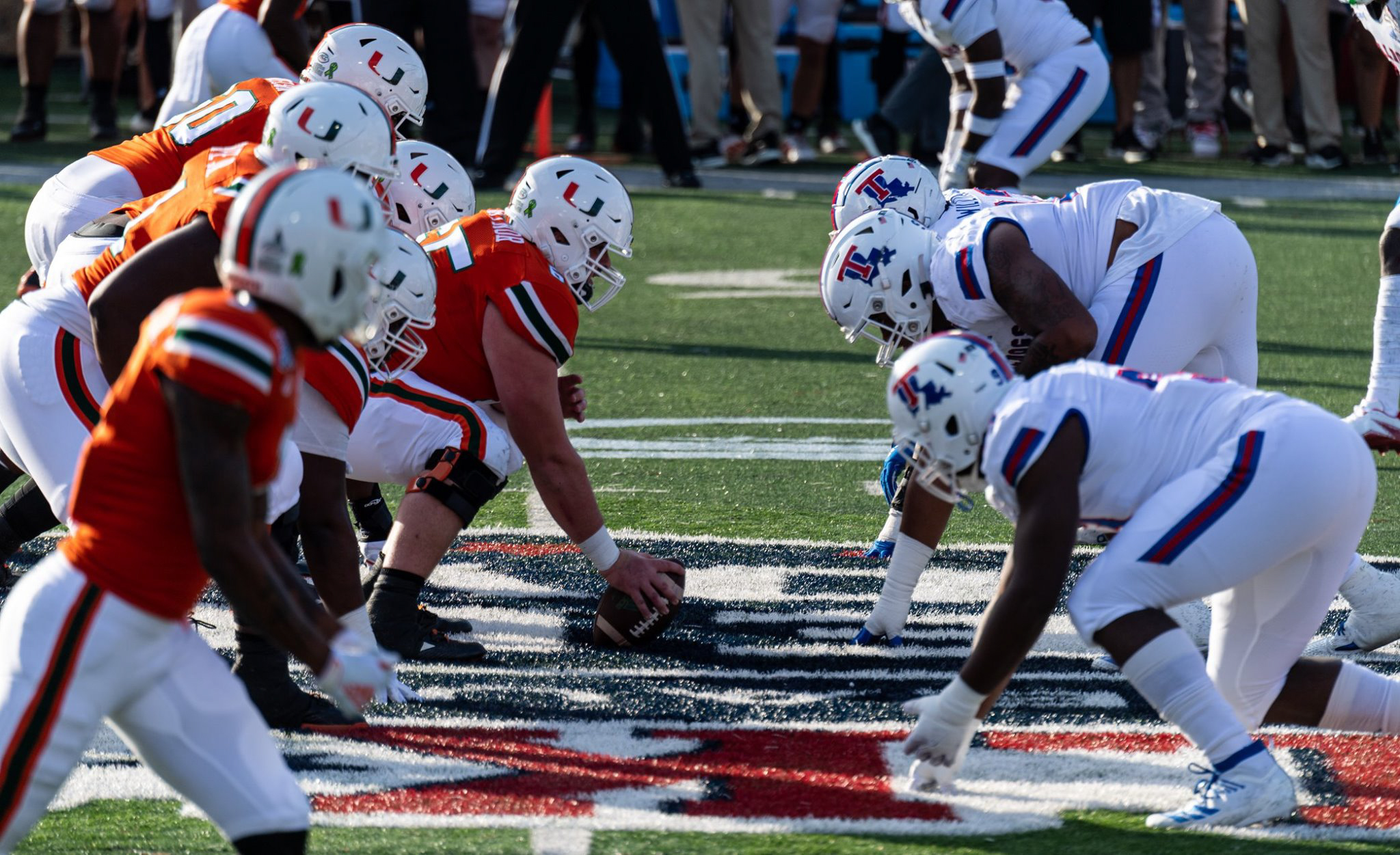
Miami (left in orange jerseys) and Louisiana Tech line up before a snap in the 2019 Independence Bowl in Shreveport, Louisiana, December 2019

Louisiana Tech vs. Miami (FL) – Game summary

Quarter	1	2	3	4	Total
Bulldogs	0	7	0	7	14
Hurricanes	0	0	0	0	0

at Independence Stadium, Shreveport, LA

- Date: December 30
- Game time: 4:00 p.m. EST
- Game weather: 71 °F (22 °C); partly cloudy
- Game attendance: 33,129
- TV: ESPN

Game information

Second Quarter

- (09:34) LT TD – Isreal Tucker 26-yard pass from J'Mar Smith, Bailey Hare kick
  Louisiana Tech 7–0; Drive: 13 plays, 91 yards, 5:18

Fourth Quarter

- (01:15) LT TD – J'Mar Smith 8-yard rush, Bailey Hare kick
  Louisiana Tech 14–0; Drive: 5 plays, 56 yards, 2:07

Top passers

- LT – J'Mar Smith – 13/28, 163 yards, 1 TD, 1 INT
- MIA – Jarren Williams – 9/20, 94 yards, 1 INT

Top rushers

- LT – Justin Henderson – 22 carries, 95 yards
- MIA – Cam'Ron Harris – 12 carries, 31 yards

Top receivers

- LT – Malik Stanley – 3 receptions, 75 yards
- MIA – K. J. Osborn – 5 receptions, 56 yards

Statistics	Miami	Louisiana Tech
First downs	18	15
Total yards	337	227
Rushing yards	174	74
Passing yards	163	153
Turnovers	1	3
Time of possession	31:26	28:34

== Players drafted into the NFL ==
Round	Pick	Player	Position	NFL club
4	140	Shaquille Quarterman	ILB	Jacksonville Jaguars
4	144	DeeJay Dallas	RB	Seattle Seahawks
5	176	K. J. Osborn	WR	Minnesota Vikings
7	242	Jonathan Garvin	DE	Green Bay Packers
