= 2019 Louisiana Tech Bulldogs football team =

American college football season

2019 Louisiana Tech Bulldogs football

C-USA West Division co-champion Independence Bowl champion

Independence Bowl, W 14–0 vs. Miami (FL)
- Conference: Conference USA
- West Division
- Record: 10–3 (6–2 C-USA)
- Head coach: Skip Holtz (7th season)
- Offensive coordinator: Todd Fitch (4th season)
- Offensive scheme: Multiple
- Defensive coordinator: Bob Diaco (1st season)
- Base defense: 3–4
- Home stadium: Joe Aillet Stadium

2019 Conference USA football standings
	Conf.			Overall
Team	W		L	W		L
East Division
Florida Atlantic xy$	7	–	1	11	–	3
Marshall	6	–	2	8	–	5
Western Kentucky	6	–	2	9	–	4
Charlotte	5	–	3	7	–	6
Middle Tennessee	3	–	5	4	–	8
FIU	3	–	5	6	–	7
Old Dominion	0	–	8	1	–	11
West Division
UAB xy	6	–	2	9	–	5
Louisiana Tech x	6	–	2	10	–	3
Southern Miss	5	–	3	7	–	6
North Texas	3	–	5	4	–	8
UTSA	3	–	5	4	–	8
Rice	3	–	5	3	–	9
UTEP	0	–	8	1	–	11
Championship: Florida Atlantic 49, UAB 6
$ – Conference champion; x – Division champion/co-champions; y – Championship game participant

The 2019 Louisiana Tech Bulldogs football team represented Louisiana Tech University in the 2019 NCAA Division I FBS football season. The Bulldogs played their home games at Joe Aillet Stadium in Ruston, Louisiana, and competed in the West Division of Conference USA (C-USA). They were led by seventh-year head coach Skip Holtz.

== Preseason ==
=== CUSA media poll ===
Conference USA released their preseason media poll on July 16, 2019, with the Bulldogs predicted to finish in third place in the West Division.

=== Preseason All-Conference USA teams ===
2019 Preseason All-Conference USA

All-CUSA Offense
Position	Player	Class
WR	Adrian Hardy	Jr.

All-CUSA Defense
Position	Player	Class
DB	Amik Robertson	Jr.

All-CUSA Special Teams
Position	Player	Class
No players were selected

== Roster ==
2019 Louisiana Tech Bulldogs football team roster
Players
Coaches
Offense

Pos.	#	Name	Class
QB	3	Aaron Allen	Fr
QB	5	Logan McFadden	Fr
WR	6	Adrian Hardy	Jr
QB	8	J'Mar Smith	Sr
QB	10	Westin Elliott	Jr
WR	11	George Scott	Jr
WR	13	Isaiah Graham	Jr
WR	14	Praise Okorie	Jr
WR	15	Malik Stanley	Sr
TE	16	Zach Cousar	Jr
QB	18	Jakson Thomson	Fr
WR	19	Smoke Harris	Fr
RB	22	Israel Tucker	Jr
RB	23	Jaqwis Dancy	Sr
WR	24	Joshua Matthews	So
WR	26	Jawaun Johnson	Jr
RB	27	Elijah Hines	Fr
RB	29	DeAndre Marcus	Fr
RB	32	Ishmael Landers	Fr
RB	33	Justin Henderson	Jr
FB	41	Bobby Holly	Sr
FB	45	Jacob Adams	So
OL	47	Drake Carroll	Fr
OL	51	Antawn Lewis	So
OL	55	Drew Kirkpatrick	Sr
OL	60	Brett Pope	Fr
OL	61	Ethan Reed	Sr
OL	62	Abraham Delfin	So
OL	63	Stevie Ballard	Fr
OL	64	Joshua Mote	So
OL	65	Kody Russey	Jr
OL	67	Walker Hankinson	Fr
OL	68	Justin Throckmorton	So
OL	72	Christian Henderson	Fr
OL	73	Willie Allen	Jr
OL	74	Jonah Brewster	Fr
OL	76	Biron Rossell	Fr
OL	77	Gewhite Stallworth	Sr
OL	78	Taylor Fondal	Jr
OL	79	Carter Habich	So
WR	80	Griffin Hebert	So
WR	81	Cee Jay Powell	Jr
WR	82	Doyle Adams Jr.	Fr
WR	83	Jake Norris	Jr
WR	84	Javonte Woodard	Sr
WR	85	Joseph Walker	Fr
WR	86	Wayne Toussant	Fr
WR	87	Carson Rieder	Fr
WR	88	Kyle Maxwell	Fr
WR	89	Tahj Magee	Fr
OL	95	Noah Pitre	Fr

Defense

Pos.	#	Name	Class
S	1	L'Jarius Sneed	Sr
LB	2	Connor Taylor	Sr
LB	3	Trey Baldwin	Jr
S	4	Darryl Lewis	Sr
CB	5	Michael Sam	Sr
S	7	Jaiden Cole	So
LB	8	Brandon Floyd	Jr
S	10	James Jackson	Sr
CB	16	CJ Johnson	Fr
CB	17	Brodrick Calhoun	Fr
CB	18	Zach Hannibal	Jr
S	20	Kollin Hurt	So
CB	21	Amik Robertson	Jr
CB	23	Marquallius Turner	Fr
S	25	Bee Jay Williamson	Fr
LB	26	Jacorion Andrews	So
CB	30	Aaron Robertson	Sr
S	31	Christian Archangel	Fr
CB	32	Trey Spencer	Sr
LB	34	Reggie Cleveland	Jr
LB	35	Collin Scott	Sr
S	36	Khiry Morrison	Fr
CB	37	Ephraim Kitchen	Sr
CB	38	Charvis Thornton	Fr
LB	39	Randy Hogan	Sr
LB	42	Maki Carabin	Fr
DE	43	Tristan Allen	So
DT	44	Keivie Rose	Fr
LB	46	Ezekiel Barnett	Jr
DE	47	Eric Kendzior	Jr
LB	48	Alex Zayed	Jr
LB	49	Isaiah Windmon	Fr
DT	50	Chris Spence	Jr
DT	52	D. J. Jackson	Fr
LB	54	Allen Walker	Fr
DE	56	Mykol Clark	Fr
DS	58	Reeves Blankenship	So
LB	85	Willie Baker	Jr
DT	90	Courtney Wallace	Sr
DE	91	Steven Shaw	Fr
DT	92	La'Dante Davenport	Sr
LB	93	Deshon Hall	Fr
DL	94	Kevin Murphy	Sr
DL	95	Calvin Rhines	Fr
DT	96	Ka'Derrion Mason	Sr
DE	97	Milton Williams	So
DL	99	Malik Wells	Jr

Special teams

Pos.	#	Name	Class
K	9	Bailey Hale	Sr
P/K	29	Brady Farlow	Jr
LS	40	Kyle Conrad	Jr
LS	66	Noah White	Fr
K/P	98	Jacob Barnes	Fr

Head coach

- Skip Holtz (Notre Dame)

Coordinators/assistant coaches

- Joe Sloan (East Carolina)
  Assistant head coach/co-offensive coordinator
- Todd Fitch (Ohio Wesleyan)
  Co-offensive coordinator/QB
- Bob Diaco (Iowa)
  Defensive coordinator
- Dennis Smith (Miami (FL))
  Special teams coordinator/OLB
- Jeff Burris (Notre Dame)
  Defensive backs
- Brian Gamble (Texas A&M)
  Linebackers
- Robert McFarland (McNeese State)
  Offensive line
- Rick Petri (Missouri–Rolla)
  Defensive line
- Brock Hays (Grambling State)
  Running backs
- Kenny Guiton (Ohio State)
  Outside receivers
- Kurt Hester (Tulane)
  Head strength and conditioning coach
- Krista Patrick
  Director of external football operation
- Paul Smith
  Director of internal football operations
- Ed Jackson
  Assistant A.D./character education
- Mac Goode
  Graduate assistant
- Sean Marinan
  Graduate assistant
- Caden Thomson
  Graduate assistant
- Jason Shumaker
  Director of football recruiting
- Jude Holloway
  Football video coordinator
- Dylan Griffin
  Assistant director of recruiting

Legend

- (C) Team captain
- (S) Suspended
- (I) Ineligible
- Injured
- Redshirt

Roster
Last update: April 16, 2020

== Schedule ==
Louisiana Tech announced its 2019 football schedule on January 10, 2019. The 2019 schedule consisted of 6 home and away games in the regular season.

Date	Time	Opponent	Site	TV	Result	Attendance
August 31	7:00 p.m.	at No. 10 Texas*	Darrell K Royal–Texas Memorial Stadium; Austin, TX	LHN	L 14–45	93,418
September 7	2:30 p.m.	Grambling State*	Joe Aillet Stadium; Ruston, LA	NFLN	W 20–14	23,174
September 14	4:00 p.m.	at Bowling Green*	Doyt Perry Stadium; Bowling Green, OH	ESPN+	W 35–7	18,021
September 20	7:00 p.m.	FIU	Joe Aillet Stadium; Ruston, LA	CBSSN	W 43–31	18,782
September 28	6:00 p.m.	at Rice	Rice Stadium; Houston, TX	ESPN3	W 23–20 ^{OT}	19,075
October 12	6:00 p.m.	UMass*	Joe Aillet Stadium; Ruston, LA	ESPN3	W 69–21	19,682
October 19	2:30 p.m.	Southern Miss	Joe Aillet Stadium; Ruston, LA (Rivalry in Dixie)	NFLN	W 45–30	23,419
October 26	7:00 p.m.	at UTEP	Sun Bowl; El Paso, TX	ESPN3	W 42–21	16,084
November 9	3:00 p.m.	North Texas^{†}	Joe Aillet Stadium; Ruston, LA	Stadium	W 52–17	22,792
November 15	6:00 p.m.	at Marshall	Joan C. Edwards Stadium; Huntington, WV	CBSSN	L 10–31	19,893
November 23	2:30 p.m.	at UAB	Legion Field; Birmingham, AL	ESPN+	L 14–20	18,346
November 30	2:30 p.m.	UTSA	Joe Aillet Stadium; Ruston, LA	ESPN+	W 41–27	14,782
December 26	3:00 p.m.	vs. Miami (FL)*	Independence Stadium; Shreveport, LA (Independence Bowl)	ESPN	W 14–0	33,129
*Non-conference game; ^{†}Homecoming; Rankings from AP Poll and CFP Rankings after November 5 released prior to game; All times are in Central time

== Game summaries ==
=== At Texas ===
Louisiana Tech at Texas – Game summary

Quarter	1	2	3	4	Total
Bulldogs	0	0	0	14	14
No. 10 Longhorns	7	17	14	7	45

at Darrell K Royal–Texas Memorial Stadium, Austin, TX

- Date: August 31
- Game time: 7:00 p.m. CST
- Game weather: 79 °F (26 °C); partly cloudy; Wind: S 3 mph
- Game attendance: 93,418
- Referee: Cooper Castlebe
- TV: Longhorn Network

Game information

First quarter

- (12:40) TEX TD – Devin Duvernay 4-yard pass from Sam Ehlinger, Cameron Dicker kick
  Texas 7–0; Drive: 7 plays, 57 yards, 2:20

Second quarter

- (13:20) TEX TD – Collin Johnson 6-yard pass from Sam Ehlinger, Cameron Dicker kick
  Texas 14–0; Drive: 11 plays, 74 yards, 3:32
- (10:26) TEX TD – Brennan Eagles 28-yard pass from Sam Ehlinger, Cameron Dicker kick
  Texas 21–0; Drive: 2 plays, 37 yards, 0:34
- (02:56) TEX FG – Cameron Dicker 43-yard field goal
  Texas 24–0; Drive: 4 plays, 6 yards, 1:08

Third quarter

- (09:06) TEX TD – Brennan Eagles 25-yard pass from Sam Ehlinger, Cameron Dicker kick
  Texas 31–0; Drive: 9 plays, 74 yards, 2:46
- (02:44) TEX TD – Keaontay Ingram 1-yard rush, Cameron Dicker kick
  Texas 38–0; Drive: 9 plays, 61 yards, 3:30

Fourth quarter

- (13:31) LT TD – Malik Stanley 5-yard pass from J'Mar Smith, Bailey Hare kick
  Texas 38–7; Drive: 9 plays, 75 yards, 4:13
- (07:54) LT TD – Griffin Hebert 12-yard pass from J'Mar Smith, Bailey Hare kick
  Texas 38–14; Drive: 12 plays, 70 yards, 3:52
- (01:09) TEX TD – Casey Thompson 2-yard rush, Cameron Dicker kick
  Texas 45–14; Drive: 5 plays, 27 yards, 1:43

Top passers

- TEX – Sam Ehlinger – 28/38, 276 yards, 4 TD
- LT – J'Mar Smith – 34/51, 331 yards, 2 TD, INT

Top rushers

- TEX – Keaontay Ingram – 11 carries, 78 yards, TD
- LT – Jaqwis Dancy – 7 carries, 25 yards

Top receivers

- TEX – Brennan Eagles – 3 receptions, 59 yards, 2 TD
- LT – Smoke Harris – 6 receptions, 58 yards

Statistics	Louisiana Tech	Texas
First downs	25	24
Total yards	413	454
Rushing yards	73	153
Passing yards	340	301
Turnovers	3	1
Time of possession	32:16	27:44

=== Grambling State ===
Grambling State at Louisiana Tech – Game summary

Quarter	1	2	3	4	Total
Tigers	0	0	7	7	14
Bulldogs	7	13	0	0	20

at Joe Aillet Stadium, Ruston, LA

- Date: September 7
- Game time: 2:30 p.m. CST
- Game weather: 98 °F (37 °C); sunny; Wind: N 5 mph
- Game attendance: 23,174
- Referee: Kevin Randall
- TV: NFL Network

Game information

First quarter

- (01:34) LT TD – Justin Henderson 7-yard rush, Bailey Hare kick
  Louisiana Tech 7–0; Drive: 9 plays, 80 yards, 4:09

Second quarter

- (10:13) LT FG – Bailey Hare 33-yard field goal
  Louisiana Tech 10–0; Drive: 11 plays, 45 yards, 4:57
- (04:38) LT TD – Griffin Hebert 40-yard pass from J'Mar Smith, Bailey Hare kick
  Louisiana Tech 17–0; Drive: 5 plays, 69 yards, 2:04
- (02:16) LT FG – Bailey Hare 48-yard field goal
  Louisiana Tech 20–0; Drive: 4 plays, 2 yards, 0:51

Third quarter

- (07:01) GRAM TD – Raylon Richardson 23-yard pass from Geremy Hickbottom, Garrett Urban kick
  Louisiana Tech 20–7; Drive: 12 plays, 93 yards, 3:52

Fourth quarter

- (03:23) GRAM TD – Jakarie Nichols 2-yard rush, Garrett Urban kick
  Louisiana Tech 20–14; Drive: 9 plays, 72 yards, 2:39

Top passers

- LT – J'Mar Smith – 17/25, 220 yards, TD
- GRAM – Geremy Hickbottom – 26/40, 239 yards, TD

Top rushers

- LT – Israel Tucker – 16 carries, 71 yards
- GRAM – Damien Crumitie – 16 carries, 68 yards

Top receivers

- LT – Griffin Hebert – 3 receptions, 68 yards, TD
- GRAM – Raylon Richardson – 4 receptions, 63 yards, TD

Statistics	Grambling State	Louisiana Tech
First downs	32	20
Total yards	455	390
Rushing yards	216	170
Passing yards	239	220
Turnovers	1	0
Time of possession	30:45	29:15

=== At Bowling Green ===
Louisiana Tech at Bowling Green – Game summary

Quarter	1	2	3	4	Total
Bulldogs	14	7	0	14	35
Falcons	7	0	0	0	7

at Doyt Perry Stadium, Bowling Green, OH

- Date: September 14
- Game time: 4:00 p.m. CST
- Game weather: 77 °F (25 °C); sunny; Wind: W 10 mph
- Game attendance: 18,021
- Referee: Billy Williams
- TV: ESPN+

Game information

First quarter

- (12:14) BGSU TD – Bryson Denley 1-yard rush, Nate Needham kick
  Bowling Green 7–0; Drive: 7 plays, 68 yards, 2:46
- (11:11) LT TD – Isaiah Graham 49-yard pass from J'Mar Smith, Bailey Hare kick
  Tied 7–7; Drive: 3 plays, 60 yards, 0:58
- (10:23) LT TD – Amik Robertson 36-yard interception returned, Bailey Hare kick
  Louisiana Tech 14–7; Drive: 3 plays, 2 yards, 0:43

Second quarter

- (05:49) LT TD – Jaqwis Dancy 8-yard rush, Bailey Hare kick
  Louisiana Tech 21–7; Drive: 4 plays, 94 yards, 1:40

Fourth quarter

- (14:49) LT TD – Jaqwis Dancy 2-yard rush, Bailey Hare kick
  Louisiana Tech 28–7; Drive: 5 plays, 65 yards, 1:27
- (10:19) LT TD – Smoke Harris 27-yard pass from J'Mar Smith, Bailey Hare kick
  Louisiana Tech 7–0; Drive: 7 plays, 57 yards, 2:20

Top passers

- LT – J'Mar Smith – 19/26, 267 yards, 2 TD
- BGSU – Darius Wade – 18/38, 171 yards, INT

Top rushers

- LT – Justin Henderson – 9 carries, 95 yards
- BGSU – Davon Jones – 13 carries, 48 yards

Top receivers

- LT – Adrian Hardy – 6 receptions, 95 yards
- BGSU – Quintin Morris – 6 receptions, 90 yards

Statistics	Louisiana Tech	Bowling Green
First downs	20	15
Total yards	453	290
Rushing yards	129	119
Passing yards	324	171
Turnovers	2	1
Time of possession	31:39	28:21

=== FIU ===
Florida International at Louisiana Tech – Game summary

Quarter	1	2	3	4	Total
Panthers	0	10	14	7	31
Bulldogs	0	13	14	16	43

at Joe Aillet Stadium, Ruston, LA

- Date: September 20
- Game time: 7:00 p.m. CST
- Game weather: 76 °F (24 °C); cloudy; Wind: S 5 mph
- Game attendance: 18,782
- Referee: Ken Antee
- TV: CBS Sports Network

Game information

Second quarter

- (14:56) LT FG – Bailey Hare 25-yard field goal
  Louisiana Tech 3–0; Drive: 13 plays, 73 yards, 5:48
- (12:24) FIU FG – Jose Borregales 36-yard field goal
  Tied 3–3; Drive: 7 plays, 51 yards, 2:32
- (09:26) LT TD – Justin Henderson 29-yard rush, Bailey Hare kick
  Louisiana Tech 10–3; Drive: 6 plays, 71 yards, 2:58
- (00:52) FIU TD – James Morgan 15-yard rush, Jose Borregales kick
  Tied 10–10; Drive: 9 plays, 74 yards, 2:45
- (00:00) LT FG – Bailey Hare 45-yard field goal
  Louisiana Tech 13–10; Drive: 6 plays, 28 yards, 0:52

Third quarter

- (13:24) FIU TD – Anthony Jones 2-yard rush, Jose Borregales kick
  Florida International 17–13; Drive: 4 plays, 75 yards, 1:36
- (08:50) LT TD – Justin Henderson 6-yard rush, Bailey Hare kick
  Louisiana Tech 20–17; Drive: 10 plays, 86 yards, 4:34
- (06:57) FIU TD – Shemar Thornton 31-yard pass from James Morgan, Jose Borregales kick
  Florida International 24–20; Drive: 4 plays, 60 yards, 1:53
- (04:16) LT TD – Justin Henderson 6-yard rush, Bailey Hare kick
  Louisiana Tech 27–24; Drive: 8 plays, 75 yards, 2:41

Fourth quarter

- (13:17) LT FG – Bailey Hare 41-yard field goal
  Louisiana Tech 30–24; Drive: 11 plays, 71 yards, 4:13
- (05:09) LT FG – Bailey Hare 25-yard field goal
  Louisiana Tech 33–24; Drive: 12 plays, 84 yards, 7:10
- (02:17) LT FG – Bailey Hare 29-yard field goal
  Louisiana Tech 36–24; Drive: 6 plays, 33 yards, 1:36
- (00:51) FIU TD – Anthony Jones 1-yard pass from James Morgan, Jose Borregales kick
  Louisiana Tech 36–31; Drive: 8 plays, 72 yards, 1:26
- (00:46) LT TD – Amik Robertson 30-yard kickoff returned, Bailey Hare kick
  Louisiana Tech 43–31; Drive: 0 plays, 0 yards, 0:00

Top passers

- LT – J'Mar Smith – 27/41, 290 yards, INT
- FIU – James Morgan – 29/41, 394 yards, 2 TD, INT

Top rushers

- LT – Justin Henderson – 15 carries, 141 yards, 3 TD
- FIU – Napoleon Maxwell – 8 carries, 78 yards

Top receivers

- LT – Griffin Hebert – 5 receptions, 78 yards
- FIU – Austin Maloney – 5 receptions, 113 yards

Statistics	FIU	Louisiana Tech
First downs	29	31
Total yards	526	565
Rushing yards	132	275
Passing yards	394	290
Turnovers	2	1
Time of possession	23:13	36:47

=== At Rice ===
Louisiana Tech at Rice – Game summary

Quarter	1	2	3	4	OT	Total
Bulldogs	7	0	7	3	6	23
Owls	7	7	0	3	3	20

at Rice Stadium, Houston, TX

- Date: September 28
- Game time: 6:00 p.m. CST
- Game weather: 88 °F (31 °C); clear; Wind: S 7-10 mph
- Game attendance: 19,075
- Referee: Chris Bynum
- TV: ESPN3

Game information

First quarter

- (09:58) RICE TD – Aston Walker 16-yard rush, Will Harrison kick
  Rice 7–0; Drive: 6 plays, 46 yards, 3:09
- (03:32) LT TD – Adrian Hardy 9-yard pass from J'Mar Smith, Bailey Hale kick
  Tied 7–7; Drive: 11 plays, 73 yards, 6:26

Second quarter

- (13:25) RICE TD – Aston Walker 2-yard rush, Will Harrison kick
  Rice 14–7; Drive: 10 plays, 67 yards, 5:07

Third quarter

- (01:23) LT TD – Justin Henderson 26-yard rush, Bailey Hale kick
  Tied 14–14; Drive: 7 plays, 76 yards, 2:58

Fourth quarter

- (02:51) RICE FG – Chris Barnes 37-yard field goal
  Rice 17–14; Drive: 14 plays, 53 yards, 7:09
- (01:10) LT FG – Bailey Hare 31-yard field goal
  Tied 17–17; Drive: 8 plays, 56 yards, 1:41

First overtime

- RICE FG – Chris Barnes 36-yard field goal
  Rice 20–17; Drive: 10 plays, 0 yards
- LT TD – J'Mar Smith 12-yard rush
  Louisiana Tech 23–20; Drive: 5 plays, 25 yards

Top passers

- LT – J'Mar Smith – 21/39, 210 yards, TD
- RICE – Wiley Green – 14/22, 128 yards

Top rushers

- LT – Justin Henderson – 12 carries, 64 yards, TD
- RICE – Aston Walter – 20 carries, 112 yards, 2 TD

Top receivers

- LT – Adrian Hardy – 6 receptions, 78 yards, TD
- RICE – Brad Rozner – 5 receptions, 64 yards

Statistics	Louisiana Tech	Rice
First downs	19	19
Total yards	294	338
Rushing yards	84	190
Passing yards	210	148
Turnovers	0	1
Time of possession	23:07	36:53

=== UMass ===
Massachusetts at Louisiana Tech – Game summary

Quarter	1	2	3	4	Total
Minutemen	0	14	7	0	21
Bulldogs	28	24	10	7	69

at Joe Aillet Stadium, Ruston, LA

- Date: October 12
- Game time: 6:00 p.m. CST
- Game weather: 63 °F (17 °C); clear; Wind: NE 3 mph
- Game attendance: 19,682
- Referee: Joe Lehring
- TV: ESPN3

Game information

First quarter

- (14:05) LT TD – Amik Robertson 42-yard interception returned, Bailey Hale kick
  Louisiana Tech 7–0; Drive: 4 plays, 14 yards, 0:55
- (10:27) LT TD – Justin Henderson 74-yard rush, Bailey Hale kick
  Louisiana Tech 14–0; Drive: 3 plays, 91 yards, 1:40
- (08:52) LT TD – Justin Henderson 4-yard rush, Bailey Hale kick
  Louisiana Tech 21–0; Drive: 3 plays, 61 yards, 0:48
- (02:24) LT TD – Justin Henderson 3-yard rush, Bailey Hale kick
  Louisiana Tech 28–0; Drive: 12 plays, 67 yards, 4:03

Second quarter

- (14:15) LT TD – Griffin Hebert 17-yard pass from J'Mar Smith, Bailey Hale kick
  Louisiana Tech 35–0; Drive: 6 plays, 28 yards, 1:44
- (10:57) LT TD – Justin Henderson 1-yard pass from J'Mar Smith, Bailey Hale kick
  Louisiana Tech 42–0; Drive: 5 plays, 44 yards, 1:16
- (09:40) UMASS TD – Randall West 1-yard rush, Cooper Garcia kick
  Louisiana Tech 42–7; Drive: 3 plays, 11 yards, 1:17
- (06:58) UMASS TD – Kyle Horn 12-yard pass from Randall West, Cooper Garcia kick
  Louisiana Tech 42–14; Drive: 5 plays, 36 yards, 1:47
- (02:20) LT TD – Cee Jay Powell 2-yard pass from J'Mar Smith, Bailey Hale kick
  Louisiana Tech 49–14; Drive: 4 plays, 72 yards, 1:51
- (00:00) LT FG – Bailey Hale 42-yard field goal
  Louisiana Tech 52–14; Drive: 4 plays, 29 yards, 0:20

Third quarter

- (10:40) LT FG – Bailey Hale 23-yard field goal
  Louisiana Tech 55–14; Drive: 12 plays, 78 yards, 4:20
- (07:04) UMASS TD – Bilal Ally 51-yard rush, Cooper Garcia kick
  Louisiana Tech 55–21; Drive: 3 plays, 49 yards, 1:12
- (06:49) LT TD – DeAndre Marcus 30-yard rush, Bailey Hale kick
  Louisiana Tech 62–21; Drive: 1 play, 30 yards, 0:15

Fourth quarter

- (11:28) LT TD – Tahj Magee 13-yard pass from Aaron Allen, Bailey Hale kick
  Louisiana Tech 69–21; Drive: 11 plays, 95 yards, 6:12

Top passers

- LT – J'Mar Smith – 16/28, 239 yards, 3 TD
- UMASS – Randall West – 17/29, 172 yards, TD, INT

Top rushers

- LT – Justin Henderson – 11 carries, 137 yards, 3 TD
- UMASS – Bilal Ally – 10 carries, 92 yards, TD

Top receivers

- LT – Cee Jay Powell – 4 receptions, 70 yards, TD
- UMASS – Zak Simon – 4 receptions, 43 yards

Statistics	UMass	Louisiana Tech
First downs	19	28
Total yards	347	689
Rushing yards	126	385
Passing yards	221	304
Turnovers	2	3
Time of possession	29:33	30:27

=== Southern Miss ===
Southern Mississippi at Louisiana Tech – Game summary

Quarter	1	2	3	4	Total
Golden Eagles	14	13	0	3	30
Bulldogs	7	17	0	21	45

at Joe Aillet Stadium, Ruston, LA

- Date: October 19
- Game time: 2:30 p.m. CST
- Game weather: 80 °F (27 °C); sunny, clear
- Game attendance: 23,419
- Referee: Justin Elliot
- TV: NFL Network

Game information

First quarter

- (14:47) USM TD – De'Michael Harris 100-yard kickoff returned, Andrew Stein kick
  Southern Miss 7–0; Drive: 0 plays, 0 yards, 0:13
- (06:48) USM TD – Ray Ladner 15-yard pass from Jack Abraham, Andrew Stein kick
  Southern Miss 14–0; Drive: 12 plays, 95 yards, 5:46
- (00:04) LT TD – Malik Stanley 5-yard pass from J'Mar Smith, Bailey Hale kick
  Southern Miss 14–7; Drive: 14 plays, 86 yards, 6:44

Second quarter

- (14:39) LT TD – Justin Henderson 30-yard rush, Bailey Hale kick
  Tied 14–14; Drive: 1 play, 30 yards, 0:06
- (10:28) USM TD – Jack Abraham 37-yard rush, Andrew Stein kick
  Southern Miss 21–14; Drive: 9 plays, 81 yards, 4:11
- (09:14) LT FG – Bailey Hale 50-yard field goal
  Southern Miss 21–17; Drive: 5 plays, 22 yards, 1:14
- (04:32) USM FG – Andrew Stein 28-yard field goal
  Southern Miss 24–17; Drive: 9 plays, 64 yards, 4:42
- (02:24) USM FG – Andrew Stein 46-yard field goal
  Souther Miss 27–17; Drive: 4 plays, -5 yards, 1:55
- (00:56) LT TD – Justin Henderson 2-yard rush, Bailey Hale kick
  Southern Miss 27–24; Drive: 6 plays, 90 yards, 1:28

Fourth quarter

- (12:02) LT TD – J'Mar Smith 1-yard rush, Bailey Hale kick
  Louisiana Tech 31–27; Drive: 10 plays, 36 yards, 5:01
- (06:28) LT TD – Bobby Holly 1-yard rush, Bailey Hale kick
  Louisiana Tech 38–27; Drive: 5 plays, 80 yards, 2:55
- (03:36) USM FG – Andrew Stein 41-yard field goal
  Louisiana Tech 38–30; Drive: 10 plays, 52 yards, 2:52
- (01:27) LT TD – Ezekiel Barnett 30-yard interception returned, Bailey Hale kick
  Louisiana Tech 45–30; Drive: 3 plays, 14 yards, 0:24

Top passers

- LT – J'Mar Smith – 14/21, 325 yards, TD, INT
- USM – Jack Abraham – 26/40, 327 yards, TD, 4 INT

Top rushers

- LT – Justin Henderson – 19 carries, 111 yards, 2 TD
- USM – Kevin Perkins – 12 carries, 56 yards

Top receivers

- LT – Malik Stanley – 8 receptions, 212 yards, 2 TD
- USM – Quez Watkins – 6 receptions, 102 yards

Statistics	Southern Miss	Louisiana Tech
First downs	23	19
Total yards	437	476
Rushing yards	110	151
Passing yards	327	325
Turnovers	4	2
Time of possession	33:08	26:52

=== At UTEP ===
Louisiana Tech at Texas–El Paso – Game summary

Quarter	1	2	3	4	Total
Bulldogs	7	21	14	0	42
Miners	7	0	0	14	21

at Sun Bowl Stadium, El Paso, TX

- Date: October 26
- Game time: 7:00 p.m. CST
- Game weather: 59 °F (15 °C); clear; Wind: SSW 8 mph
- Game attendance: 16,084
- Referee: Chris Bynum
- TV: ESPN3

Game information

First quarter

- (07:41) LT TD – Israel Tucker 1-yard rush, Bailey Hale kick
  Louisiana Tech 7–0; Drive: 8 plays, 73 yards, 3:17
- (01:35) UTEP TD – Treyvon Hughes 5-yard rush, Gavin Baechle kick
  Tied 7–7; Drive: 12 plays, 84 yards, 6:02

Second quarter

- (09:45) LT TD – Malik Stanley 9-yard pass from J'Mar Smith, Bailey Hale kick
  Louisiana Tech 14–7; Drive: 14 plays, 81 yards, 6:45
- (06:27) LT TD – Griffin Hebert 23-yard pass from J'Mar Smith, Bailey Hale kick
  Louisiana Tech 21–7; Drive: 6 plays, 41 yards, 1:54
- (00:27) LT TD – Justin Henderson 3-yard rush, Bailey Hale kick
  Louisiana Tech 28–7; Drive: 8 plays, 91 yards, 2:27

Third quarter

- (05:58) LT TD – Bobby Holly 5-yard pass from J'Mar Smith, Bailey Hale kick
  Louisiana Tech 35–7; Drive: 6 plays, 51 yards, 2:45
- (02:07) LT TD – Justin Henderson 1-yard rush, Bailey Hale kick
  Louisiana Tech 42–7; Drive: 6 plays, 26 yards, 2:51

Fourth quarter

- (09:49) UTEP TD – Kai Locksley 1-yard rush, Gavin Baechle kick
  Louisiana Tech 42–14; Drive: 15 plays, 81 yards, 7:11
- (02:51) UTEP TD – Jacob Cowing 54-yard pass from Kai Locksley, Gavin Baechle kick
  Louisiana Tech 42–21; Drive: 4 plays, 73 yards, 1:32

Top passers

- LT – J'Mar Smith – 29/35, 338 yards, 3 TD
- UTEP – Kai Locksley – 17/30, 227 yards, 1 TD

Top rushers

- LT – Justin Henderson – 17 carries, 65 yards, 2 TD
- UTEP – Treyvon Hughes – 13 carries, 60 yards, 1 TD

Top receivers

- LT – Cee Jay Powell – 6 receptions, 85 yards
- UTEP – Jacob Cowing – 2 receptions, 70 yards, 1 TD

Statistics	Louisiana Tech	UTEP
First downs	29	21
Total yards	490	331
Rushing yards	152	104
Passing yards	338	227
Turnovers	1	3
Time of possession	32:03	27:57

=== North Texas ===
North Texas at Louisiana Tech – Game summary

Quarter	1	2	3	4	Total
Mean Green	3	0	0	14	17
Bulldogs	7	10	14	21	52

at Joe Aillet Stadium, Ruston, LA

- Date: November 9
- Game time: 3:00 p.m. CST
- Game weather: 62 °F (17 °C); clear
- Game attendance: 22,792
- Referee: Jonathan Noli
- TV: Stadium

Game information

First quarter

- (12:07) UNT FG – Ethan Mooney 38-yard field goal
  North Texas 3–0; Drive: 4 plays, 6 yards, 0:51
- (09:42) LT TD – Justi Henderson 10-yard rush, Bailey Hale kick
  Louisiana Tech 7–3; Drive: 6 plays, 69 yards, 2:25

Second quarter

- (07:29) LT FG – Bailey Hale 24-yard field goal
  Louisiana Tech 10–3; Drive: 15 plays, 65 yards, 6:09
- (00:00) LT TD – Justin Henderson 1-yard rush, Bailey Hale kick
  Louisiana Tech 17–3; Drive: 9 plays, 75 yards, 1:06

Third quarter

- (05:08) LT TD – Israel Tucker 8-yard rush, Bailey Hale kick
  Louisiana Tech 24–3; Drive: 12 plays, 92 yards, 5:27
- (01:15) LT TD – Israel Graham 80-yard pass from J'Mar Smith, Bailey Hale kick
  Louisiana Tech 31–3; Drive: 1 play, 80 yards, 0:12

Fourth quarter

- (13:00) LT TD – Smoke Harris 8-yard rush, Bailey Hale kick
  Louisiana Tech 38–3; Drive: 6 plays, 38 yards, 3:06
- (09:40) LT TD – L'Jarius Sneed 68-yard interception returned, Bailey Hale kick
  Louisiana Tech 45–3; Drive: 8 plays, 50 yards, 3:20
- (09:25) UND TD – Michael Lawrence 74-yard pass from Austin Aune, Ethan Mooney kick
  Louisiana Tech 45–10; Drive: 1 play, 74 yards, 0:15
- (05:08) LT TD – Jawaun Johnson 15-yard rush, Bailey Hale kick
  Louisiana Tech 52–10; Drive: 8 plays, 72 yards, 4:17
- (03:13) UND TD – Tre Siggers 22-yard rush, Ethan Mooney kick
  Louisiana Tech 52–17; Drive: 5 plays, 73 yards, 1:55

Top passers

- LT – J'Mar Smith – 21/38, 263 yards, TD, INT
- UNT – Austin Aune – 3/4, 123 yards, TD

Top rushers

- LT – Justin Henderson – 15 carries, 58 yards, 2 TD
- UNT – Tre Siggers – 19 carries, 77 yards, TD

Top receivers

- LT – Adrian Hardy – 9 receptions, 104 yards
- UNT – Michael Lawrence – 2 receptions, 79 yards, TD

Statistics	North Texas	Louisiana Tech
First downs	16	37
Total yards	339	542
Rushing yards	74	264
Passing yards	265	278
Turnovers	4	2
Time of possession	20:56	39:04

=== At Marshall ===
Louisiana Tech at Marshall – Game summary

Quarter	1	2	3	4	Total
Bulldogs	7	0	3	0	10
Thundering Herd	0	17	7	7	31

at Joan C. Edwards Stadium, Huntington, WV

- Date: November 15
- Game time: 6:00 p.m. CST
- Game weather: 43 °F (6 °C); clear
- Game attendance: 19,893
- Referee: Rodney Burnette
- TV: CBS Sports Network

Game information

First quarter

- (09:07) LT TD – Justin Henderson 5-yard rush, Bailey Hale kick
  Louisiana Tech 7–0; Drive: 8 plays, 55 yards, 3:32

Second quarter

- (06:58) MAR FG – Justin Rohrwasser 44-yard field goal
  Louisiana Tech 7–3; Drive: 7 plays, 49 yards, 2:30
- (04:25) MAR TD – Willie Johnson 18-yard pass from Isaiah Green, Justin Rohrwasser kick
  Marshall 10–7; Drive: 3 plays, 52 yards, 0:50
- (00:40) MAR TD – Brenden Knox 1-yard rush, Justin Rohrwasser kick
  Marshall 17–7; Drive: 2 plays, 1 yard, 0:08

Third quarter

- (04:04) LT FG – Bailey Hale 38-yard field goal
  Marshall 17–10; Drive: 14 plays, 65 yards, 5:54
- (00:33) MAR TD – Isaiah Green 17-yard rush, Justin Rohrwasser kick
  Marshall 24–10; Drive: 8 plays, 75 yards, 3:31

Fourth quarter

- (06:25) MAR TD – Brenden Knox 4-yard rush, Justin Rohrwasser kick
  Marshall 31–10; Drive: 8 plays, 40 yards, 4:22

Top passers

- MAR – Isaiah Green – 14/26, 213 yards, TD, INT
- LT – Aaron Allen – 19/32, 159 yards

Top rushers

- MAR – Brenden Knox – 25 carries, 113 yards, 2 TD
- LT – Justin Henderson – 21 carries, 87 yards, TD

Top receivers

- MAR – Obi Obialo – 8 receptions, 146 yards
- LT – Smoke Harris – 9 receptions, 91 yards

Statistics	Louisiana Tech	Marshall
First downs	18	22
Total yards	261	405
Rushing yards	67	192
Passing yards	194	213
Turnovers	2	1
Time of possession	27:19	32:41

=== At UAB ===
Louisiana Tech at Alabama–Birmingham – Game summary

Quarter	1	2	3	4	Total
Bulldogs	0	7	0	7	14
Blazers	3	10	7	0	20

at Legion Field, Birmingham, AL

- Date: November 23
- Game time: 2:30 p.m. CST
- Game weather: 56 °F (13 °C); overcast
- Game attendance: 18,346
- Referee: Justin Elliott
- TV: ESPN+

Game information

First quarter

- (10:21) UAB FG – Nick Vogel 36-yard field goal
  Alabama–Birmingham 3–0; Drive: 10 plays, 47 yards, 4:39

Second quarter

- (09:15) LT TD – Isaiah Graham 42-yard pass from Aaron Allen, Bailey Hale kick
  Louisiana Tech 7–3; Drive: 3 plays, 53 yards, 0:46
- (01:35) UAB TD – Gerrit Prince 14-yard pass from Dylan Hopkins, Nick Vogel kick
  Alabama–Birmingham 10–7; Drive: 7 plays, 57 yards, 2:21
- (00:23) UAB FG – Nick Vogel 31-yard field goal
  Alabama–Birmingham 13–7; Drive: 5 plays, 49 yards, 0:48

Third quarter

- (04:20) UAB TD – Lucious Stanley 2-yard rush, Nick Vogel kick
  Alabama–Birmingham 20–7; Drive: 12 plays, 76 yards, 6:45

Fourth quarter

- (08:07) LT TD – Smoke Harris 5-yard pass from Aaron Allen, Bailey Hale kick
  Alabama–Birmingham 20–14; Drive: 14 plays, 80 yards, 6:04

Top passers

- UAB – Dylan Hopkins – 11/21, 185 yards, TD, INT
- LT – Aaron Allen – 16/34, 173 yards, 2 TD

Top rushers

- UAB – Lucious Stanley – 13 carries, 61 yards, TD
- LT – Justin Henderson – 16 carries, 63 yards

Top receivers

- UAB – Myron Mitchell – 4 receptions, 81 yards
- LT – Isaiah Graham – reception, 42 yards, TD

Statistics	Louisiana Tech	UAB
First downs	16	17
Total yards	270	353
Rushing yards	97	166
Passing yards	173	187
Turnovers	0	1
Time of possession	27:08	32:52

=== UTSA ===
Texas–San Antonio at Louisiana Tech – Game summary

Quarter	1	2	3	4	Total
Roadrunners	10	7	3	7	27
Bulldogs	14	10	10	7	41

at Joe Aillet Stadium, Ruston, LA

- Date: November 30
- Game time: 2:30 p.m. CST
- Game attendance: 14,782
- TV: ESPN+

Game information

First quarter

- (12:02) LT FG – Hunter Duplessis 28-yard field goal
  Louisiana Tech 3–0; Drive: 8 plays, 64 yards, 2:58
- (10:59) LT TD – Griffin Hebert 22-yard pass from J'Mar Smith, Bailey Hale kick
  Louisiana Tech 7–3; Drive: 4 plays, 66 yards, 1:03
- (03:21) LT TD – J'Mar Smith 5-yard rush, Bailey Hale kick
  Louisiana Tech 14–3; Drive: 4 plays, 85 yards, 1:43
- (00:16) UTSA TD – Brenden Brady 2-yard rush, Hunter Duplessis kick
  Louisiana Tech 14–10; Drive: 9 plays, 75 yards, 3:05

Second quarter

- (11:35) UTSA TD – Blaze Moorhead 0-yard fumble returned, Hunter Duplessis kick
  Texas–San Antonio 17–14; Drive: 7 plays, 29 yards, 2:39
- (08:39) LT TD – Isaiah Graham 39-yard pass from J'Mar Smith, Bailey Hale kick
  Louisiana Tech 21–17; Drive: 7 plays, 76 yards, 2:56
- (00:00) LT FG – Bailey Hale 34-yard field goal
  Louisiana Tech 24–17; Drive: 10 plays, 74 yards, 3:08

Third quarter

- (07:08) LT TD – James Jackson 17-yard interception returned, Bailey Hale kick
  Louisiana Tech 31–17; Drive: 5 plays, 9 yards, 2:23
- (04:52) UTSA FG – Hunter Duplessis 27-yard field goal
  Louisiana Tech 31–20; Drive: 7 plays, 42 yards, 2:16
- (01:17) LT FG – Bailey Hale 25-yard field goal
  Louisiana Tech 34–20; Drive: 8 plays, 67 yards, 3:35

Fourth quarter

- (12:46) LT TD – Griffin Hebert 24-yard pass from J'Mar Smith, Bailey Hale kick
  Louisiana Tech 41–20; Drive: 6 plays, 80 yards, 2:05
- (06:59) UTSA TD – Sincere McCormick 6-yard pass from Jordan Weeks, Hunter Duplessis kick
  Louisiana Tech 41–27; Drive: 3 plays, 68 yards, 0:47

Top passers

- LT – J'Mar Smith – 25/35, 331 yards, 3 TD
- UTSA – Jordan Weeks – 26/44, 280 yards, TD, 2 INT

Top rushers

- LT – Justin Henderson – 20 carries, 105 yards
- UTSA – Sincere McCormick – 17 carries, 119 yards

Top receivers

- LT – Griffin Hebert – 3 receptions, 92 yards, 2 TD
- UTSA – Sheldon Jones – 8 receptions, 115 yards

Statistics	UTSA	Louisiana Tech
First downs	17	24
Total yards	408	499
Rushing yards	128	168
Passing yards	280	331
Turnovers	2	2
Time of possession	27:45	32:15

=== Vs. Miami (FL) (Independence Bowl) ===
Louisiana Tech vs. Miami (FL) – Game summary

Quarter	1	2	3	4	Total
Bulldogs	0	7	0	7	14
Hurricanes	0	0	0	0	0

at Independence Stadium, Shreveport, LA

- Date: December 30
- Game time: 3:00 p.m. CST
- Game weather: 71 °F (22 °C); partly cloudy
- Game attendance: 33,129
- TV: ESPN

Game information

Second Quarter

- (09:34) LT TD – Isreal Tucker 26-yard pass from J'Mar Smith, Bailey Hare kick
  Louisiana Tech 7–0; Drive: 13 plays, 91 yards, 5:18

Fourth Quarter

- (01:15) LT TD – J'Mar Smith 8-yard rush, Bailey Hare kick
  Louisiana Tech 14–0; Drive: 5 plays, 56 yards, 2:07

Top passers

- LT – J'Mar Smith – 13/28, 163 yards, 1 TD, 1 INT
- MIA – Jarren Williams – 9/20, 94 yards, 1 INT

Top rushers

- LT – Justin Henderson – 22 carries, 95 yards
- MIA – Cam'Ron Harris – 12 carries, 31 yards

Top receivers

- LT – Malik Stanley – 3 receptions, 75 yards
- MIA – K. J. Osborn – 5 receptions, 56 yards

Statistics	Miami	Louisiana Tech
First downs	18	15
Total yards	337	227
Rushing yards	174	74
Passing yards	163	153
Turnovers	1	3
Time of possession	31:26	28:34

== Players drafted into the NFL ==
Round	Pick	Player	Position	NFL Club
4	138	L'Jarius Sneed	S	Kansas City Chiefs
4	139	Amik Robertson	CB	Las Vegas Raiders

Undrafted free agents include: J'Mar Smith, signed by the New England Patriots
