= 2019 NCAA Division I FBS football season =

American college football season

2019 NCAA Division I FBS season
- College football 150th anniversary logo
- Number of teams: 130
- Duration: August 24, 2019 – December 14, 2019
- Preseason AP No. 1: Clemson

Postseason
- Duration: December 20, 2019 – January 13, 2020
- Bowl games: 40
- AP Poll No. 1: LSU
- Coaches Poll No. 1: LSU
- Heisman Trophy: Joe Burrow, QB, LSU

College Football Playoff
- 2020 College Football Playoff National Championship
- Site: Mercedes-Benz Superdome; New Orleans, Louisiana
- Champion(s): LSU

NCAA Division I FBS football seasons
- ← 2018 2020 →

The 2019 NCAA Division I FBS football season was the 150th season of college football in the United States organized by the National Collegiate Athletic Association (NCAA) at its highest level of competition, the Football Bowl Subdivision (FBS). The regular season began on August 24, 2019, and ended on December 14, 2019. The postseason concluded on January 13, 2020, with the 2020 College Football Playoff National Championship at the Mercedes-Benz Superdome in New Orleans. The LSU Tigers defeated the defending champion Clemson Tigers by a score of 42–25 to claim their first national championship in the College Football Playoff (CFP) era, and fourth overall. It was the sixth season of the College Football Playoff (CFP) system.

November 6, 2019, marked the 150th anniversary of what is traditionally considered the first college football game, played between Princeton and Rutgers in 1869. Various sports media, the NCAA, and the CFP honored the 150th anniversary of the sport throughout the season. Because there were no games played during the 1871 season, this was also the 150th season of college football.

== Conference realignment ==
=== Membership changes ===
Liberty completed a two-year transition from the FCS to the FBS in 2018 and became fully bowl-eligible starting with the 2019 season. It remained an NCAA Division I FBS Independent.

== Rule changes ==
The following playing rule changes have been approved by the NCAA Playing Rules Oversight Panel for 2019:

- Requiring replay reviews on targeting calls be either confirmed or overturned by reviewing all aspects of the play. If the review cannot confirm that all elements of targeting exist, the targeting call will be overturned. "Stands" is no longer a valid option for replay reviews on targeting fouls.
- Players who commit three or more targeting penalties in the same season will receive a one-game suspension in addition to any ejection penalties.
- Eliminating the two-man wedge on kickoffs, except when the kicking team is in an obvious onside kick formation or if the kick results in a touchback, fair catch, or goes out of bounds in the field of play.
- Starting with the fifth overtime period, each team will line up at the three-yard line to attempt a two point conversion instead of snapping the ball from the 25 yard line. The first game using this new procedure was on October 19, 2019, between the North Carolina Tar Heels and the Virginia Tech Hokies which went to six overtimes before Virginia Tech won 43–41.
- Adding a two-minute break after the second and fourth overtime period.
- Blindside blocks delivered with forcible contact will draw a 15-yard penalty (personal foul). If elements of targeting exist, the player delivering the block will be subject to ejection (and suspension if it's the third targeting foul in the season) as with any other targeting foul.

== Other headlines ==
- January 31 – The NCAA Division I Committee on Infractions banned SEC school Missouri's football, baseball and softball teams from competing in the postseason for the 2019 season and placed the athletics department on 3 years of probation. The penalties were handed down after a 2 year investigation into alleged academic fraud, conducted by the University of Missouri and initiated by former Missouri tutor Yolanda Kumar's allegations in November 2016 that she improperly assisted 42 student-athletes. She claimed she was groomed by her superiors to commit "academic dishonesty" and alleged that she completed online courses and took final exams for Missouri men's basketball and football players. The NCAA Division I Committee on Infractions found that Kumar violated NCAA ethical conduct, academic misconduct and academic extra benefits rules when she completed academic work for 12 student-athletes. The NCAA's report did not find evidence that her colleagues directed her to complete the athletes' work. Kumar was given a 10-year show-cause order, in which any NCAA member attempting to hire her must restrict her from any athletic-related duties. The football, baseball and softball programs will have a 5 percent reduction in scholarships and a 12.5 percent reduction in official visits and evaluation days for the 2019–20 academic year. Further, these sports will face a 7 week ban on unofficial visits, recruiting communications, and off-campus recruiting evaluation days. Finally, the NCAA fined Missouri $5,000, plus 1 percent of each of its budgets in football, baseball and softball. Missouri athletic director Jim Sterk issued a statement saying the school will file an appeal.
- February 8 – Ohio State Athletic Director Gene Smith announced that he is stepping down from the CFP selection committee in order to focus on helping head coach Ryan Day. He will be replaced by Iowa athletic director Gary Barta.
- February 12 – Ole Miss Athletic Director Ross Bjork announced that Ole Miss will vacate 33 victories from their football program between the seasons of 2010 and 2016 due to fielding ineligible players. The Rebels will vacate four wins from 2010, two from 2011, seven from 2012, seven from 2013, eight from 2014 and five from 2016, to include a victory over Alabama in 2014. The vacated wins stem from an investigation into the Ole Miss football program involving academic, booster and recruiting misconduct, and a lack of institutional control. Ole Miss had already served a two-year postseason ban in 2017 and 2018 and was given three years of probation, through 2020, as well as scholarship reductions and recruiting restrictions in sanctions handed down more than a year ago.
- March 9 – U.S. District Judge Claudia Ann Wilken ruled against the NCAA in an antitrust lawsuit, saying football and basketball players should be permitted to receive more compensation from schools but only if the benefits are tied to education. Her ruling said the NCAA cannot "limit compensation or benefits related to education." The claim was originally brought forward by West Virginia football player Shawne Alston, and later merged with other lawsuits, including one brought forward by Clemson player Martin Jenkins. Judge Wilken had previously ruled against the NCAA in the O'Bannon v. NCAA lawsuit brought against the NCAA by former UCLA player Ed O'Bannon.
- May 13 – The Orange Bowl was rescheduled for December 30, 2019, after initially being scheduled on New Year's Day, 2020. The adjustment was made to allow the 2019 Orange Bowl to maintain its status as a prime-time event. Had it remained on New Year's Day, it would have been scheduled to play in the afternoon, rather than at night. It is not a College Football Playoff Semifinal game this season.
- June 4 – The Big Ten and SEC announced changes to its bowl tie-ins for the 2020 season through 2025. The two conferences joined the Belk Bowl and Las Vegas Bowl in alternating years; the Big Ten will play the Las Vegas Bowl in odd-numbered years, and the SEC in even-numbered years, both against a Pac-12 opponent. This move acts to heighten the profile of the game, as it plans to move to Allegiant Stadium (future home of the NFL's Oakland Raiders) in 2020. The conference not playing the Las Vegas bowl will play an ACC opponent at the Belk Bowl. The Big Ten will also gain a tie-in for the Florida-based Cheez-It Bowl. In return, the Big Ten will drop the Gator Bowl and Holiday Bowl.
- June 27 – The Big East Conference, following a vote of approval by the presidents of the conference's current members, announced that the University of Connecticut will be joining the Big East in academic year 2020–21. Thus, the 2019 season will be UConn's last in the American Athletic Conference. UConn had not yet determined which conference their football team will play in, as the AAC will not allow UConn to remain as a football-only member and the Big East does not currently sponsor football. UConn was a charter member of the original Big East when it formed in 1979. The original conference split along football lines in 2013, with three football-sponsoring schools departing for the Atlantic Coast Conference, the seven schools without FBS football leaving to form a new Big East Conference, and the remaining FBS schools joining with several new members to reorganize the original Big East corporate entity as The American. All three members of the current Big East that sponsor football play that sport in FCS conferences.
- July 26 – Multiple media reports indicated that UConn and The American had reached a buyout agreement that cemented July 2020 as UConn's exit date. The fee was reportedly $17 million. UConn also announced that its football team would become an FBS independent.
- August 19 & 20 – Arkansas State announced that head coach Blake Anderson had taken a leave of absence while his wife Wendy was dealing with a second bout with breast cancer. The following day, the coach posted on Twitter that his wife had died. During Anderson's bereavement leave, Red Wolves defensive coordinator David Duggan served as interim head coach. Anderson returned to the sidelines for the Red Wolves' September 7 game at UNLV.
- September 21 – Pitt defeated UCF 35–34 ending the Knights 25-game regular-season winning streak in a game known as the "Pitt Special"
- September 30 – California governor Gavin Newsom signed the Fair Pay to Play Act into law, which upon taking effect in 2023 will prohibit public colleges and universities in the state from punishing their athletes for earning endorsement income. The bill places the state in direct conflict with the NCAA's current rules, which prohibits college athletes from receiving such income. At the time the bill was signed, several other states were proposing similar laws.
- October 19 – Illinois upset Wisconsin 24–23 on a last-second field goal. The 30 1/2 point underdog's win was the biggest upset in Big Ten football since Northwestern's win over Minnesota in 1982 as a 32 point underdog. This was Illinois's first win over a ranked opponent since defeating Arizona State in 2011. Also in this game, Wisconsin running back Jonathan Taylor became the 4th player in FBS football history to reach 5,000 career rushing yards during his junior season (including bowl games), joining former Georgia running back Herschel Walker, former Wisconsin running back Ron Dayne, and former Oregon running back LaMichael James. Taylor reached this milestone in 736 career rushes, fewer than the previous quickest to this milestone (James in 755 career rushes).
- October 27 – LSU edged Alabama and Ohio State in one of the closest AP Poll votes ever. LSU received 1,476 points and 17 first-place votes from the voters, while Alabama received 1,474 points and 21 first-place votes and Ohio State received 1,468 points and 17 first-place votes. This 8-point margin between 1st and 3rd was the fewest since the current ranking system was remade in 1978.
- October 29 – The NCAA board of governors voted unanimously to begin the process of changing institutional rules so that college athletes can profit from their names, images, and likenesses, while still maintaining a distinction between college and professional sports. The proposal calls for each of the three NCAA divisions to draft new rules consistent with this mandate, with a target date of January 2021.
- November 5 — The first College Football Playoff committee rankings were released. The committee ranked Ohio State at No. 1, after the November 3 AP Poll ranked LSU at No. 1 and the November 3 Coaches Poll ranked Alabama at No. 1. This resulted in all three major college football selectors splitting on the number one team for the first time in the CFP era.

== Stadiums ==
=== Updated ===
- Appalachian State is currently rebuilding the north end zone of Kidd Brewer Stadium. The $45 million upgrade began with the demolition of Owens Field House, and will feature an accommodation of a wide variety of athletics and academic uses and will add around 1,000 seats to the stadium. The project is expected to be completed in time for the start of the 2020 season.
- Iowa is rebuilding the north end zone of Kinnick Stadium. The $89.9 million upgrade will feature the addition of box seating, outdoor club seating, and a new scoreboard. The entire project is nearing completion and is expected to be finished in time for the Hawkeyes' 2019 home opener.
- Liberty is expanding the Arthur L. Williams Football Operations Center at Williams Stadium; additions to the east and west sides of the building will bring the center to about 75,000 square feet. Construction is expected to be completed in time for the 2020 season.
- Missouri is rebuilding the south end zone of Faurot Field. The $98 million upgrade will feature new suites, club seats and a 750-person membership only field-level club, an expanded video scoreboard, as well as a new football facility with state-of-the-art training rooms, offices, and home and away dressing rooms. Construction is expected to be completed in time for the 2019 season.
- Old Dominion is currently rebuilding the east and west grandstands of Ballard Stadium. The $24.8 million upgrade began with demolition of the old grandstands immediately after the Monarchs' last 2018 home game, with reconstruction expected to be completed in time for ODU's 2019 home opener.
- Syracuse began a $118 million, two-phase renovation of the Carrier Dome during the summer of 2019. The centerpiece of the first phase, planned to be completed in time for the 2020 football season, will see the Dome's inflatable roof replaced by a new fixed, semi-translucent roof. Other improvements in this phase include a new scoreboard that can be moved to optimal positions for football or basketball, Wi-Fi improvements, new sound and lighting systems, and accessibility upgrades. The second phase, to be completed in 2022, will see the installation of air conditioning, new concessions space, and further accessibility upgrades.
- Coastal Carolina has completed the expansion of Brooks Stadium, adding an Upper Deck and Suites to the west grandstands. This expansion brings the seating capacity to 20,000.

=== Renamed ===
- Rutgers renamed their stadium to SHI Stadium as part of a new naming rights agreement with New Jersey–based IT firm SHI International Corp.

==== Related news ====
- While the stadium was not renamed, Louisville announced on October 24, 2019 that it had settled a naming rights dispute with Papa John's Pizza founder John Schnatter regarding Cardinal Stadium. The company's name had been stripped from the stadium in 2018 amid controversy over the use of a racial slur by Schnatter. Unlike most naming rights deals, the Cardinal Stadium contract was with Schnatter personally and not Papa John's, and gave him almost unlimited power to change the stadium name. The settlement calls for the Louisville athletic department to pay Schnatter $9.5 million over 5 years in exchange for his release of naming rights.

=== Upcoming ===
- The 2019 season was the last for South Alabama at its current home of Ladd–Peebles Stadium. The school began construction of the new on-campus Hancock Whitney Stadium in 2018, and plans to open the 25,000-seat facility in time for the 2020 season.
- The Birmingham–Jefferson Civic Center Authority began construction on UAB's new home of Protective Stadium on the grounds of the Birmingham–Jefferson Convention Complex on July 25, 2019. The new venue, seating slightly over 45,000, is planned to open in 2021.
- The 2019 season was expected to be the last for UNLV at its current off-campus home of Sam Boyd Stadium. For 2020 and beyond, the Rebels will move to the new Allegiant Stadium, also off-campus but much closer to the school, alongside the stadium's primary tenant, the relocated Las Vegas Raiders of the NFL.

== Kickoff games ==
Rankings reflect the AP poll entering each week.

=== Week Zero ===
The regular season began with two Week 0 games on Saturday, August 24:

Date	Visiting team	Home team	Site	Result	Attendance	Ref.
August 24	Miami (FL)	No. 8 Florida	Camping World Stadium • Orlando, FL (Camping World Kickoff, Florida Cup, rivalry)	20–24	66,543	
August 24	Arizona	Hawaii	Aloha Stadium • Hālawa, HI	38–45	22,396	
^{#}Rankings from AP poll released prior to the game.

=== Week 1 ===
The majority of FBS teams opened the season on Labor Day weekend. Three neutral-site kickoff games were held.

Date	Visiting team	Home team	Site	Result	Attendance	Ref.
August 31	South Carolina	North Carolina	Bank of America Stadium • Charlotte, NC (Belk College Kickoff Game, Battle of the Carolinas)	20–24	52,183	
August 31	No. 11 Oregon	No. 16 Auburn	AT&T Stadium • Arlington, TX (Advocare Classic)	21–27	60,662	
August 31	Duke	No. 2 Alabama	Mercedes-Benz Stadium • Atlanta, GA (Chick-fil-A Kickoff Game)	3–42	71,916	
^{#}Rankings from AP poll released prior to the game.

=== Week 3 ===
An additional kickoff game was held on Friday, September 13.

Date	Visiting team	Home team	Site	Result	Attendance	Ref.
September 13	No. 20 Washington State	Houston	NRG Stadium • Houston, TX (Texas Kickoff)	31–24	40,523	
^{#}Rankings from AP poll released prior to the game.

== Regular season top 10 matchups ==
Rankings reflect the AP poll. Rankings for week 11 (November 5) and beyond lists College Football Playoff rankings first and AP poll second. Teams that fail to be a top-ten team for one poll or the other will be noted.

Date	Visiting team	Home team	Site	Result	Attendance	Ref.
September 7	No. 2 LSU	No. 9 Texas	Darrell K Royal–Texas Memorial Stadium • Austin, TX	45–38	98,763	
September 21	No. 7 Notre Dame	No. 3 Georgia	Sanford Stadium • Athens, GA	17–23	93,246	
October 5	No. 7 Auburn	No. 10 Florida	Ben Hill Griffin Stadium • Gainesville, FL (rivalry)	13–24	90,584	
October 12	No. 7 Florida	No. 5 LSU	Tiger Stadium • Baton Rouge, LA (rivalry)	28–42	102,321	
October 26	No. 9 Auburn	No. 2 LSU	Tiger Stadium • Baton Rouge, LA (Tiger Bowl)	20–23	102,160	
November 2	No. 8 Georgia	No. 6 Florida	TIAA Bank Field • Jacksonville, FL (rivalry)	24–17	84,789	
November 9	No. 2/1 LSU	No. 3/2 Alabama	Bryant–Denny Stadium • Tuscaloosa, AL (rivalry)	46–41	101,821	
November 23	No. 8/9 Penn State	No. 2/2 Ohio State	Ohio Stadium • Columbus, OH (rivalry)	17–28	104,355	
November 30	No. 1/2 Ohio State	No. 13/10 Michigan	Michigan Stadium • Ann Arbor, MI (The Game)	56–27	112,071	
December 7	No. 7/8 Baylor	No. 6/6 Oklahoma	AT&T Stadium • Arlington, TX (Big 12 Conference championship)	23–30 ^{OT}	65,191	
December 7	No. 4/4 Georgia	No. 2/1 LSU	Mercedes-Benz Stadium • Atlanta, GA (SEC championship)	10–37	74,150	
December 7	No. 1/2 Ohio State	No. 8/10 Wisconsin	Lucas Oil Stadium • Indianapolis, IN (Big Ten Conference championship)	34–21	66,649	
^{#}Rankings from AP poll and CFP released prior to the game.

== Upsets ==
During the college football regular season, 35 unranked teams defeated an AP poll-ranked opponent. The highest ranked teams that lost to an unranked opponent were No. 3 Georgia in week 7, No. 6 Wisconsin in week 8, No. 5 Oklahoma in week 9, and No. 6 Oregon in week 13.

No. 3 Georgia (−20.5) falls to South Carolina in 2OT

On October 12, No. 3 Georgia Bulldogs (5–0, 2–0) played a home conference game against the South Carolina Gamecocks (2–3, 1–2). The Bulldogs, who had won five straight against the Gamecocks, were favored by 20.5 points. Though Georgia outgained South Carolina by more than 170 yards, they had four turnovers to South Carolina's none. Tied at 17, the game went to overtime, where, after Georgia failed to score on its possession, South Carolina had a chance to kick a game-winning 33-yard field goal. However, they missed it and the game went to a second overtime where South Carolina converted on a 24-yard field goal and Georgia missed a 42-yard field goal.

No. 6 Wisconsin (−30.5) defeated by Illinois on last second field goal

On October 19, No. 6 Wisconsin Badgers (6–0, 3–0) was heavily favored, by 30.5 points, against their conference rivals Illinois Fighting Illini (2–4, 0–2). The game was played at Illinois' stadium in Champaign, Illinois. Wisconsin led the entire game until a last second field goal was made by Illinois to give them a 24–23 win. Wisconsin turned over the ball on their last two drives which allowed Illinois to score twice in the last six minutes of the game. The Badgers had previously defeated the Fighting Illini in nine consecutive match-ups.

No. 5 Oklahoma's rally falls short against Kansas State (+23.5) after onside kick recovery overturned

On October 26, No. 5 Oklahoma Sooners (7–0, 4–0) traveled to the Kansas State Wildcats (4–2, 1–2) for a conference game. The Sooners were favored by 23.5 points and led 17–7 after the 1st quarter. However, Kansas State built a large 48–23 lead by scoring on 8 consecutive possessions, including scoring on each possession in the 2nd and 3rd quarters, after punting on its first possession of the game. In the 4th quarter, Oklahoma scored 18 consecutive points to cut the Kansas State lead to 48–41. After Oklahoma attempted an onside kick and appeared to recover it, the recovery was overturned due to an Oklahoma player touching the football prior to the ball traveling the required 10 yards. Kansas State was awarded possession of the ball and ran out the clock to preserve the Wildcats' first win over a top 5 team since 2006 and their first home win over Oklahoma since 1996.

No. 6 Oregon (−13.5) loses at Arizona State

On November 23, No. 6 Oregon Ducks (9–1, 7–0) traveled to the Arizona State Sun Devils (5–5, 2–5) for a conference game. The Ducks were favored by 13.5 points, but were behind at halftime 10–7. Arizona State stretched its lead to 24–7 with less than 9 minutes left in the 4th quarter, before 4 combined touchdowns scored in the final minutes allowed the Sun Devils to escape with a 31–28 victory.

Date	Visiting team	Home team	Site	Result	Attendance	Ref.
September 7	California	No. 14 Washington	Husky Stadium • Seattle, WA	20–19	66,327	
September 7	No. 21 Syracuse	Maryland	Maryland Stadium • College Park, MD	20–63	33,493	
September 7	No. 23 Stanford	USC	Los Angeles Memorial Coliseum • Los Angeles, CA (rivalry)	20–45	62,109	
September 7	No. 25 Nebraska	Nebraska	Folsom Field • Boulder, CO (rivalry)	31–34 ^{OT}	52,829	
September 14	Arizona State	No. 18 Michigan State	Spartan Stadium • East Lansing, MI	10–7	73,531	
September 14	No. 21 Maryland	Temple	Lincoln Financial Field • Philadelphia, PA	17–20	30,610	
September 14	No. 24 USC	BYU	LaVell Edwards Stadium • Provo, UT	27–30 ^{OT}	62,546	
September 20	No. 10 Utah	USC	Los Angeles Memorial Coliseum • Los Angeles, CA	23–30	55,719	
September 21	No. 15 UCF	Pittsburgh	Heinz Field • Pittsburgh, PA	34–35	42,056	
September 21	UCLA	No. 19 Washington State	Martin Stadium • Pullman, WA	67–63	32,952	
September 21	Colorado	No. 24 Arizona State	Sun Devil Stadium • Tempe, AZ	34–31	45,786	
September 21	SMU	No. 25 TCU	Amon G. Carter Stadium • Fort Worth, TX (Iron Skillet)	41–38	41,250	
September 27	Arizona State	No. 15 California	California Memorial Stadium • Berkeley, CA	24–17	47,532	
September 28	No. 24 Kansas State	Oklahoma State	Boone Pickens Stadium • Stillwater, OK	13–26	55,509	
October 4	No. 18 UCF	Cincinnati	Nippert Stadium • Cincinnati, OH (rivalry)	24–27	40,121	
October 5	No. 15 Washington	Stanford	Stanford Stadium • Stanford, CA	13–23	33,225	
October 5	No. 21 Oklahoma State	Texas Tech	Jones AT&T Stadium • Lubbock, TX	35–45	56,479	
October 11	No. 20 Virginia	Miami (FL)	Hard Rock Stadium • Miami Gardens, FL	9–17	54,538	
October 12	South Carolina	No. 3 Georgia	Sanford Stadium • Athens, GA (rivalry)	20–17 ^{2OT}	92,746	
October 12	Louisville	No. 19 Wake Forest	BB&T Field • Winston-Salem, NC	62–59	24,434	
October 12	No. 23 Memphis	Temple	Lincoln Financial Field • Philadelphia, PA	28–30	34,253	
October 19	No. 6 Wisconsin	Illinois	Memorial Stadium • Champaign, IL	23–24	37,363	
October 19	No. 14 Boise State	BYU	LaVell Edwards Stadium • Provo, UT	25–28	58,930	
October 19	No. 22 Missouri	Vanderbilt	Vanderbilt Stadium • Nashville, TN	14–21	23,900	
October 26	No. 5 Oklahoma	Kansas State	Bill Snyder Family Stadium • Manhattan, KS	41–48	50,394	
October 26	No. 15 Texas	TCU	Amon G. Carter Stadium • Fort Worth, TX (rivalry)	27–37	47,660	
October 26	Oklahoma State	No. 23 Iowa State	Jack Trice Stadium • Ames, IA	34–27	61,500	
October 26	No. 24 Arizona State	UCLA	Rose Bowl • Pasadena, CA	32–42	39,811	
October 31	Georgia Southern	No. 20 Appalachian State	Kidd Brewer Stadium • Boone, NC (Deeper Than Hate)	24–21	18,796	
November 9	No. 20 Kansas State	Texas	Darrell K Royal–Texas Memorial Stadium • Austin, TX	24–27	97,833	
November 9	No. 22 Wake Forest	Virginia Tech	Lane Stadium • Blacksburg, VA	17–36	65,632	
November 16	No. 22 Texas	Iowa State	Jack Trice Stadium • Ames, IA	21–23	58,946	
November 23	No. 6 Oregon	Arizona State	Sun Devil Stadium • Tempe, AZ	28–31	51,875	
November 23	No. 21 SMU	Navy	Navy–Marine Corps Memorial Stadium • Annapolis, MD (Gansz Trophy)	28–35	33,732	
November 29	No. 23 Virginia Tech	Virginia	Scott Stadium • Charlottesville, VA (Commonwealth Cup)	30–39	52,619	
^{#}Rankings from AP poll released prior to the game.

=== Postseason upsets ===
This section lists unranked teams that defeated AP poll-ranked teams during the 2019–20 NCAA football bowl games.

Date	Visiting team	Home team	Site	Result	Attendance	Ref.
December 21	No. 18 Boise State	Washington	Sam Boyd Stadium • Whitney, NV (Las Vegas Bowl)	7–38	34,197	
December 27	No. 25 Oklahoma State	Texas A&M	NRG Stadium • Houston, TX (Texas Bowl)	21–24	68,415	
December 31	No. 12 Utah	Texas	Alamodome • San Antonio, TX (Alamo Bowl)	10–38	60,147	
^{#}Rankings from AP poll released on December 8.

== FCS team wins over FBS teams ==
Italics denotes FCS teams.

Date	Visiting team	Home team	Site	Result	Attendance	Ref.
August 29	Central Arkansas	Western Kentucky	Houchens Industries–L. T. Smith Stadium • Bowling Green, Kentucky	35–28	17,120	
September 7	Southern Illinois	UMass	Warren McGuirk Alumni Stadium • Amherst, Massachusetts	45–20	10,524	
September 14	The Citadel	Georgia Tech	Bobby Dodd Stadium • Atlanta, Georgia	27–24 ^{OT}	42,871	
^{#}Rankings from AP Poll released prior to game.

== Conference standings ==
2019 American Athletic Conference football standings
	Conf.			Overall
Team	W		L	W		L
East Division
No. 21 Cincinnati xy	7	–	1	11	–	3
No. 24 UCF	6	–	2	10	–	3
Temple	5	–	3	8	–	5
South Florida	2	–	6	4	–	8
East Carolina	1	–	7	4	–	8
UConn	0	–	8	2	–	10
West Division
No. 17 Memphis xy$	7	–	1	12	–	2
No. 20 Navy x	7	–	1	11	–	2
SMU	6	–	2	10	–	3
Tulane	3	–	5	7	–	6
Houston	2	–	6	4	–	8
Tulsa	2	–	6	4	–	8
Championship: Memphis 29, Cincinnati 24
$ – Conference champion; x – Division champion/co-champions; y – Championship game participant; Rankings from AP Poll

2019 Atlantic Coast Conference football standings
	Conf.			Overall
Team	W		L	W		L
Atlantic Division
No. 2 Clemson xy$^	8	–	0	14	–	1
Louisville	5	–	3	8	–	5
Wake Forest	4	–	4	8	–	5
Boston College	4	–	4	6	–	7
Florida State	4	–	4	6	–	7
Syracuse	2	–	6	5	–	7
NC State	1	–	7	4	–	8
Coastal Division
Virginia x	6	–	2	9	–	5
Virginia Tech	5	–	3	8	–	5
Pittsburgh	4	–	4	8	–	5
North Carolina	4	–	4	7	–	6
Miami (FL)	4	–	4	6	–	7
Duke	3	–	5	5	–	7
Georgia Tech	2	–	6	3	–	9
Championship: Clemson 62, Virginia 17
^ – College Football Playoff participant; $ – Conference champion; x – Division champion/co-champions; Rankings from AP Poll

2019 Big Ten Conference football standings
	Conf.			Overall
Team	W		L	W		L
East Division
No. 3 Ohio State xy$^	9	–	0	13	–	1
No. 9 Penn State	7	–	2	11	–	2
No. 18 Michigan	6	–	3	9	–	4
Indiana	5	–	4	8	–	5
Michigan State	4	–	5	7	–	6
Maryland	1	–	8	3	–	9
Rutgers	0	–	9	2	–	10
West Division
No. 11 Wisconsin xy	7	–	2	10	–	4
No. 10 Minnesota x	7	–	2	11	–	2
No. 15 Iowa	6	–	3	10	–	3
Illinois	4	–	5	6	–	7
Purdue	3	–	6	4	–	8
Nebraska	3	–	6	5	–	7
Northwestern	1	–	8	3	–	9
Championship: Ohio State 34, Wisconsin 21
^ – College Football Playoff participant; $ – Conference champion; x – Division champion/co-champions; y – Championship game participant; Rankings from AP Poll

2019 Big 12 Conference football standings
	Conf.			Overall
Team	W		L	W		L
No. 7 Oklahoma y$^	8	–	1	12	–	2
No. 13 Baylor y	8	–	1	11	–	3
No. 25 Texas	5	–	4	8	–	5
Oklahoma State	5	–	4	8	–	5
Kansas State	5	–	4	8	–	5
Iowa State	5	–	4	7	–	6
West Virginia	3	–	6	5	–	7
TCU	3	–	6	5	–	7
Texas Tech	2	–	7	4	–	8
Kansas	1	–	8	3	–	9
Championship: Oklahoma 30, Baylor 23 ^{OT}
^ – College Football Playoff participant; $ – Conference champion; y – Championship game participant; Rankings from AP Poll

2019 Conference USA football standings
	Conf.			Overall
Team	W		L	W		L
East Division
Florida Atlantic xy$	7	–	1	11	–	3
Marshall	6	–	2	8	–	5
Western Kentucky	6	–	2	9	–	4
Charlotte	5	–	3	7	–	6
Middle Tennessee	3	–	5	4	–	8
FIU	3	–	5	6	–	7
Old Dominion	0	–	8	1	–	11
West Division
UAB xy	6	–	2	9	–	5
Louisiana Tech x	6	–	2	10	–	3
Southern Miss	5	–	3	7	–	6
North Texas	3	–	5	4	–	8
UTSA	3	–	5	4	–	8
Rice	3	–	5	3	–	9
UTEP	0	–	8	1	–	11
Championship: Florida Atlantic 49, UAB 6
$ – Conference champion; x – Division champion/co-champions; y – Championship game participant

2019 Mid-American Conference football standings
	Conf.			Overall
Team	W		L	W		L
East Division
Miami (OH) x$	6	–	2	8	–	6
Ohio	5	–	3	7	–	6
Buffalo	5	–	3	8	–	5
Kent State	5	–	3	7	–	6
Bowling Green	2	–	6	3	–	9
Akron	0	–	8	0	–	12
West Division
Central Michigan x	6	–	2	8	–	6
Western Michigan	5	–	3	7	–	6
Ball State	4	–	4	5	–	7
Northern Illinois	4	–	4	5	–	7
Toledo	3	–	5	6	–	6
Eastern Michigan	3	–	5	6	–	7
Championship: Miami 26, Central Michigan 21
$ – Conference champion; x – Division champion/co-champions

2019 Mountain West Conference football standings
	Conf.			Overall
Team	W		L	W		L
Mountain Division
No. 23 Boise State xy$	8	–	0	12	–	2
No. 22 Air Force	7	–	1	11	–	2
Utah State	6	–	2	7	–	6
Wyoming	4	–	4	8	–	5
Colorado State	3	–	5	4	–	8
New Mexico	0	–	8	2	–	10
West Division
Hawaii xy	5	–	3	10	–	5
San Diego State x	5	–	3	10	–	3
Nevada	4	–	4	7	–	6
San Jose State	2	–	6	5	–	7
UNLV	2	–	6	4	–	8
Fresno State	2	–	6	4	–	8
Championship: Boise State 31, Hawaii 10
$ – Conference champion; x – Division champion/co-champions; y – Championship game participant; Rankings from AP Poll

2019 Pac-12 Conference football standings
	Conf.			Overall
Team	W		L	W		L
North Division
No. 5 Oregon xy$	8	–	1	12	–	2
California	4	–	5	8	–	5
Washington	4	–	5	8	–	5
Oregon State	4	–	5	5	–	7
Washington State	3	–	6	6	–	7
Stanford	3	–	6	4	–	8
South Division
No. 16 Utah xy	8	–	1	11	–	3
USC	7	–	2	8	–	5
Arizona State	4	–	5	8	–	5
UCLA	4	–	5	4	–	8
Colorado	3	–	6	5	–	7
Arizona	2	–	7	4	–	8
Championship: Oregon 37, Utah 15
$ – Conference champion; x – Division champion/co-champions; y – Championship game participant; Rankings from AP Poll

2019 Southeastern Conference football standings
	Conf.			Overall
Team	W		L	W		L
Eastern Division
No. 4 Georgia x	7	–	1	12	–	2
No. 6 Florida	6	–	2	11	–	2
Tennessee *	5	–	3	8	–	5
Kentucky	3	–	5	8	–	5
Missouri *	3	–	5	6	–	6
South Carolina	3	–	5	4	–	8
Vanderbilt	1	–	7	3	–	9
Western Division
No. 1 LSU x$#^	8	–	0	15	–	0
No. 8 Alabama	6	–	2	11	–	2
No. 14 Auburn	5	–	3	9	–	4
Texas A&M	4	–	4	8	–	5
Mississippi State	3	–	5	6	–	7
Ole Miss	2	–	6	4	–	8
Arkansas	0	–	8	2	–	10
Championship: LSU 37, Georgia 10
# – College Football Playoff champion; ^ – College Football Playoff participant; $ – Conference champion; x – Division champion/co-champions; * – Tennessee vacated all wins due to NCAA violations. Missouri was ineligible for postseason due to NCAA sanctions.; Rankings from AP Poll

2019 Sun Belt Conference football standings
	Conf.			Overall
Team	W		L	W		L
East Division
No. 19 Appalachian State x$	7	–	1	13	–	1
Georgia Southern	5	–	3	7	–	6
Georgia State	4	–	4	7	–	6
Troy	3	–	5	5	–	7
Coastal Carolina	2	–	6	5	–	7
West Division
Louisiana x	7	–	1	11	–	3
Arkansas State	5	–	3	8	–	5
Louisiana–Monroe	4	–	4	5	–	7
Texas State	2	–	6	3	–	9
South Alabama	1	–	7	2	–	10
Championship: Appalachian State 45, Louisiana 38
$ – Conference champion; x – Division champion/co-champions; Rankings from AP Poll

2019 NCAA Division I FBS independents football records
	Conf.			Overall
Team	W		L	W		L
No. 12 Notre Dame		–		11	–	2
Liberty		–		8	–	5
BYU		–		7	–	6
Army		–		5	–	8
New Mexico State		–		2	–	10
UMass		–		1	–	11
Rankings from AP Poll

== Conference summaries ==
Conference	Champion	Runner-up	Score	Offensive Player of the Year	Defensive Player of the Year	Coach of the Year
ACC	Clemson ^{CFP} (Atlantic)	Virginia (Coastal)	62–17	Travis Etienne, RB, Clemson	Isaiah Simmons, LB, Clemson	Scott Satterfield, Louisville
American	Memphis (West)	Cincinnati (East)	29–24	Malcolm Perry, QB, Navy	Quincy Roche, DE, Temple	Ken Niumatalolo, Navy
Big Ten	Ohio State ^{CFP} (East)	Wisconsin (West)	34–21	Justin Fields, QB, Ohio State	Chase Young, DE, Ohio State	Ryan Day (media), Ohio State; P. J. Fleck (coaches), Minnesota
Big 12	Oklahoma ^{CFP}	Baylor	30–23 (OT)	Chuba Hubbard, RB, Oklahoma State	James Lynch, DL, Baylor	Matt Rhule, Baylor
C-USA	Florida Atlantic (East)	UAB (West)	49–6	J'Mar Smith, QB, Louisiana Tech	DeAngelo Malone, DL, WKU	Tyson Helton, WKU
MAC	Miami (OH) (East)	Central Michigan (West)	26–21	LeVante Bellamy, RB, Western Michigan	Treshaun Hayward, LB, Western Michigan	Jim McElwain, Central Michigan
MW	Boise State (Mountain)	Hawaii (West)	31–10	Josh Love, QB, San Jose State	Curtis Weaver, DE, Boise State	Nick Rolovich, Hawaii
Pac-12	Oregon (North)	Utah (South)	37–15	Zack Moss, RB, Utah	Evan Weaver, LB, California	Kyle Whittingham, Utah
SEC	LSU ^{CFP} (West)	Georgia (East)	37–10	Joe Burrow, QB, LSU	Derrick Brown, DE, Auburn	Ed Orgeron, LSU
Sun Belt	Appalachian State (East)	Louisiana (West)	45–38	Darrynton Evans, RB, Appalachian State	Akeem Davis-Gaither, LB, Appalachian State	Billy Napier, Louisiana

^{CFP} College Football Playoff participant

== Postseason ==
=== Bowl selections ===
There were 39 team-competitive post-season bowl games, with two teams advancing to a 40th – the CFP National Championship game. Normally, a team is required to have a .500 minimum winning percentage during the regular season to become bowl-eligible (six wins for an 11- or 12-game schedule, and seven wins for a 13-game schedule). If there are not enough winning teams to fulfill all open bowl slots, teams with losing records may be chosen to fill all 78 bowl slots. Additionally, on the rare occasion in which a conference champion does not meet eligibility requirements, they are usually still chosen for bowl games via tie-ins for their conference.

==== Bowl-eligible teams ====
- ACC (10): Boston College, Clemson, Florida State, Louisville, Miami (FL), North Carolina, Pittsburgh, Virginia, Virginia Tech, Wake Forest
- American (7): Cincinnati, Memphis, Navy, SMU, Temple, Tulane, UCF
- Big Ten (9): Illinois, Indiana, Iowa, Michigan, Michigan State, Minnesota, Ohio State, Penn State, Wisconsin
- Big 12 (6): Baylor, Iowa State, Kansas State, Oklahoma, Oklahoma State, Texas
- C-USA (8): Charlotte, Florida Atlantic, FIU, Louisiana Tech, Marshall, Southern Miss, UAB, Western Kentucky
- MAC (8): Buffalo, Central Michigan, Eastern Michigan, Kent State, Miami (OH), Ohio, Toledo*, Western Michigan
- Mountain West (7): Air Force, Boise State, Hawaii, Nevada, San Diego State, Utah State, Wyoming
- Pac-12 (7): Arizona State, California, Oregon, USC, Utah, Washington, Washington State
- SEC (9): Alabama, Auburn, Florida, Georgia, Kentucky, LSU, Mississippi State, Tennessee, Texas A&M
- Sun Belt (5): Appalachian State, Arkansas State, Georgia Southern, Georgia State, Louisiana
- Independent (3): BYU, Liberty, Notre Dame

Number of bowl berths available: 78
Number of bowl-eligible teams: 79

==== Bowl-eligible teams that were not invited ====
- MAC (1): Toledo (6–6)

==== Bowl-ineligible teams ====
- ACC (4): Duke, Georgia Tech, NC State, Syracuse
- American (5): East Carolina, Houston, South Florida, Tulsa, UConn
- Big Ten (5): Maryland, Nebraska, Northwestern, Purdue, Rutgers
- Big 12 (4): Kansas, TCU, Texas Tech, West Virginia
- C-USA (6): Middle Tennessee, North Texas, Old Dominion, Rice, UTEP, UTSA
- MAC (4): Akron, Ball State, Bowling Green, Northern Illinois
- Mountain West (5): Colorado State, Fresno State, New Mexico, San Jose State, UNLV
- Pac-12 (5): Arizona, Colorado, Oregon State, Stanford, UCLA
- SEC (5): Arkansas, Missouri, (Note: In January 2019, Missouri's football program received a one-season postseason ban, due to misconduct by a tutor in completing coursework for student-athletes. Missouri appealed the bowl ban but the NCAA upheld the decision shortly before Missouri's sixth win.) Ole Miss, South Carolina, Vanderbilt
- Sun Belt (5): Coastal Carolina, Louisiana-Monroe, South Alabama, Texas State, Troy
- Independent (3): Army, New Mexico State, UMass

Number of bowl-ineligible teams: 51

=== College Football Playoff ===
Semifinals
December 28 – Peach Bowl Mercedes-Benz Stadium, Atlanta
1	LSU	63
4	Oklahoma	28
December 28 – Fiesta Bowl State Farm Stadium, Glendale
2	Ohio State	23
3	Clemson	29

Championship
January 13 – National Championship Mercedes-Benz Superdome, New Orleans
1	LSU	42
3	Clemson	25

=== Conference performance in bowl games ===
Conference	Total games	Wins	Losses	Pct.
SEC	10	8	2	.800
Independents	3	2	1	.667
Sun Belt	5	3	2	.600
The American	7	4	3	.571
MW	7	4	3	.571
Pac-12	7	4	3	.571
Big Ten	9	4	5	.444
MAC	7	3	4	.429
ACC	11	4	7	.364
C-USA	8	3	5	.375
Big 12	6	1	5	.167

== Awards and honors ==
=== Heisman Trophy voting ===
The Heisman Trophy is given to the year's most outstanding player.

Player	School	Position	1st	2nd	3rd	Total
Joe Burrow	LSU	QB	841	41	3	2,608
Jalen Hurts	Oklahoma	QB	12	231	264	762
Justin Fields	Ohio State	QB	6	271	187	747
Chase Young	Ohio State	DE	20	205	173	643
Jonathan Taylor	Wisconsin	RB	6	44	83	189
J. K. Dobbins	Ohio State	RB	2	36	36	114
Trevor Lawrence	Clemson	QB	3	25	29	88
Chuba Hubbard	Oklahoma State	RB	0	11	46	68
Travis Etienne	Clemson	RB	0	7	11	25
Tua Tagovailoa	Alabama	QB	1	4	13	24

=== Other overall ===
- AP Player of the Year: Joe Burrow, QB, LSU
- Lombardi Award (top player): Joe Burrow, QB, LSU
- Maxwell Award (top player): Joe Burrow, QB, LSU
- SN Player of the Year: Joe Burrow, LSU
- Walter Camp Award (top player): Joe Burrow, QB, LSU

=== Special overall ===
- Burlsworth Trophy (top player who began as walk-on): Kenny Willekes, DE, Michigan State
- Paul Hornung Award (most versatile player): Lynn Bowden Jr., WR/RS/QB, Kentucky
- Jon Cornish Trophy (top Canadian player): Chuba Hubbard, RB, Oklahoma State
- William V. Campbell Trophy ("academic Heisman"): Justin Herbert, QB, Oregon
- Wuerffel Trophy (humanitarian-athlete): Jon Wassink, QB, Western Michigan
- Senior CLASS Award (senior student-athlete): Derrick Brown, DT, Auburn

=== Offense ===
Quarterback

- Davey O'Brien Award: Joe Burrow, LSU
- Johnny Unitas Golden Arm Award (senior/4th-year quarterback): Joe Burrow, LSU
- Manning Award: Joe Burrow, LSU

Running back

- Doak Walker Award: Jonathan Taylor, Wisconsin

Wide receiver

- Fred Biletnikoff Award: Ja'Marr Chase, LSU

Tight end

- John Mackey Award: Harrison Bryant, Florida Atlantic

Lineman:

- Rimington Trophy (center): Tyler Biadasz, Wisconsin
- Outland Trophy (interior lineman): Penei Sewell, OT, Oregon
- Joe Moore Award (offensive line unit): LSU

=== Defense ===
- Bronko Nagurski Trophy (defensive player): Chase Young, DE, Ohio State
- Chuck Bednarik Award (defensive player): Chase Young, DE, Ohio State
- Lott Trophy (defensive impact): Derrick Brown, DT, Auburn

Defensive front

- Dick Butkus Award (linebacker): Isaiah Simmons, Clemson
- Ted Hendricks Award (defensive end): Chase Young, Ohio State

Defensive back

- Jim Thorpe Award: Grant Delpit, S, LSU

=== Special teams ===
- Lou Groza Award (placekicker): Rodrigo Blankenship, Georgia
- Ray Guy Award (punter): Max Duffy, Kentucky
- Jet Award (return specialist): Joe Reed, Virginia
- Peter Mortell Award (holder): Preston Brady, Memphis
- Patrick Mannelly Award (holder): John Shannon, Notre Dame

=== Coaches ===
- AFCA Coach of the Year: Ed Orgeron, LSU
- AP Coach of the Year: Ed Orgeron, LSU
- Bobby Dodd Coach of the Year: Kyle Whittingham, Utah
- Eddie Robinson Coach of the Year: Ed Orgeron, LSU
- George Munger Collegiate Coach of the Year: Ed Orgeron, LSU
- Home Depot Coach of the Year: Ed Orgeron, LSU
- Paul "Bear" Bryant Award: Ed Orgeron, LSU
- Sporting News Coach of the Year: Matt Rhule, Baylor
- Walter Camp Coach of the Year: Ed Orgeron, LSU

==== Assistants ====
- AFCA Assistant Coach of the Year: Mike Viti, FB, Army
- Broyles Award: Joe Brady, passing game coordinator and wide receivers coach, LSU

== Rankings ==
=== CFB Playoff final rankings ===
On December 8, 2019, the College Football Playoff selection committee announced its final team rankings for the year.

Rank	Team	W–L	Conference and standing	Bowl game
1	LSU	13–0	SEC Champions	Peach Bowl (CFP Semifinal #1)
2	Ohio State	13–0	Big Ten Champions	Fiesta Bowl (CFP Semifinal #2)
3	Clemson	13–0	ACC Champions	Fiesta Bowl (CFP Semifinal #2)
4	Oklahoma	12–1	Big 12 Champions	Peach Bowl (CFP Semifinal #1)
5	Georgia	11–2	SEC Runners-up	Sugar Bowl
6	Oregon	11–2	Pac-12 Champions	Rose Bowl
7	Baylor	11–2	Big 12 Runners-up	Sugar Bowl
8	Wisconsin	10–3	Big Ten Runners-up	Rose Bowl
9	Florida	10–2	SEC East Division second place	Orange Bowl
10	Penn State	10–2	Big Ten East Division second place	Cotton Bowl
11	Utah	11–2	Pac-12 Runners-up	Alamo Bowl
12	Auburn	9–3	SEC West Division third place	Outback Bowl
13	Alabama	10–2	SEC West Division second place	Citrus Bowl
14	Michigan	9–3	Big Ten East Division third place	Citrus Bowl
15	Notre Dame	10–2	Independent	Camping World Bowl
16	Iowa	9–3	Big Ten West Division third place	Holiday Bowl
17	Memphis	12–1	American Champions	Cotton Bowl
18	Minnesota	10–2	Big Ten West Division co-champions	Outback Bowl
19	Boise State	12–1	Mountain West Champions	Las Vegas Bowl
20	Appalachian State	12–1	Sun Belt Champions	New Orleans Bowl
21	Cincinnati	10–3	American Runners-up	Birmingham Bowl
22	USC	8–4	Pac-12 South Division second place	Holiday Bowl
23	Navy	9–2	American West Division co-champions	Liberty Bowl
24	Virginia	9–4	ACC Runners-up	Orange Bowl
25	Oklahoma State	8–4	Big 12 third place	Texas Bowl

== Coaching changes ==
=== Preseason and in-season ===
This is restricted to coaching changes taking place on or after May 1, 2019, and includes any changes announced after a team's last regularly scheduled game but before its bowl game. For coaching changes that occurred earlier in 2019, see 2018 NCAA Division I FBS end-of-season coaching changes.

Team	Outgoing coach	Date	Reason	Replacement
Rutgers	Chris Ash	September 29, 2019	Fired	Nunzio Campanile (Interim)
Florida State	Willie Taggart	November 3, 2019	Fired	Odell Haggins (Interim)
Arkansas	Chad Morris	November 10, 2019	Fired	Barry Lunney Jr. (Interim)
Boston College	Steve Addazio	December 1, 2019	Fired	Rich Gunnell (Interim)
Washington	Chris Petersen	December 2, 2019	Resigned (effective after Washington's bowl game)	Jimmy Lake
Florida Atlantic	Lane Kiffin	December 7, 2019	Hired by Ole Miss	Glenn Spencer (bowl)
Memphis	Mike Norvell	December 7, 2019	Hired by Florida State	Ryan Silverfield

=== End of season ===
This list includes coaching changes announced during the season that did not take effect until the end of the season.

Team	Outgoing coach	Date	Reason	Replacement
New Mexico	Bob Davie	November 25, 2019	Resigned	Danny Gonzales
UNLV	Tony Sanchez	November 25, 2019	Resigned	Marcus Arroyo
Missouri	Barry Odom	November 30, 2019	Fired	Eliah Drinkwitz
Rutgers	Nunzio Campanile (Interim)	December 1, 2019	Permanent replacement	Greg Schiano
UTSA	Frank Wilson	December 1, 2019	Fired	Jeff Traylor
South Florida	Charlie Strong	December 1, 2019	Fired	Jeff Scott
Ole Miss	Matt Luke	December 1, 2019	Fired	Lane Kiffin
Old Dominion	Bobby Wilder	December 2, 2019	Resigned	Ricky Rahne
Colorado State	Mike Bobo	December 4, 2019	Resigned	Steve Addazio
Fresno State	Jeff Tedford	December 5, 2019	Resigned	Kalen DeBoer
Arkansas	Barry Lunney Jr. (Interim)	December 7, 2019	Permanent replacement	Sam Pittman
Florida State	Odell Haggins (Interim)	December 8, 2019	Permanent replacement	Mike Norvell
Appalachian State	Eliah Drinkwitz	December 8, 2019	Hired by Missouri	Shawn Clark
Florida Atlantic	Glenn Spencer (Interim)	December 11, 2019	Permanent replacement	Willie Taggart
Boston College	Rich Gunnell (Interim)	December 13, 2019	Permanent replacement	Jeff Hafley
Mississippi State	Joe Moorhead	January 3, 2020	Fired	Mike Leach
Baylor	Matt Rhule	January 7, 2020	Hired by Carolina Panthers	Dave Aranda
San Diego State	Rocky Long	January 8, 2020	Resigned	Brady Hoke
Washington State	Mike Leach	January 9, 2020	Hired by Mississippi State	Nick Rolovich
Hawaii	Nick Rolovich	January 14, 2020	Hired by Washington State	Todd Graham
Michigan State	Mark Dantonio	February 4, 2020	Resigned	Mel Tucker
Colorado	Mel Tucker	February 12, 2020	Hired by Michigan State	Karl Dorrell

== Television viewers and ratings ==
=== Most watched regular season games ===
All times Eastern. Rankings are from the AP Poll (before 11/5) and CFP Rankings (thereafter).

Rank	Date	Matchup				Network	Viewers (millions)	TV Rating	Significance
1	November 9, 3:30pm	No. 2 LSU	46	No. 3 Alabama	41	CBS	16.64	9.7	College GameDay/Rivalry/Game of the Century
2	November 30, 12:00pm	No. 1 Ohio State	56	No. 13 Michigan	27	FOX	12.42	7.1	Big Noon Kickoff/Rivalry
3	November 30, 3:30pm	No. 5 Alabama	45	No. 15 Auburn	48	CBS	11.43	6.3	Rivalry
4	November 23, 12:00pm	No. 8 Penn State	17	No. 2 Ohio State	28	FOX	9.43	5.8	Big Noon Kickoff/College GameDay/Rivalry
5	September 21, 8:00pm	No. 7 Notre Dame	17	No. 3 Georgia	23	CBS	9.29	5.4	College GameDay
6	September 7, 7:30pm	No. 6 LSU	45	No. 9 Texas	38	ABC	8.63	5.0	College GameDay
7	December 14, 3:00pm	Army	7	Navy	31	CBS	7.72	4.9	College GameDay/Rivalry
8	October 12, 12:00pm	No. 6 Oklahoma	34	No. 11 Texas	27	FOX	7.25	4.5	Big Noon Kickoff/Rivalry
9	October 26, 3:30pm	No. 9 Auburn	20	No. 2 LSU	23	CBS	7.18	4.3	Rivalry
10	November 2, 3:30pm	No. 8 Georgia	24	No. 6 Florida	17	CBS	6.98	4.2	Rivalry

=== Conference championship games ===
All times Eastern. Rankings are from the CFP Rankings.

Rank	Date	Matchup				Network	Viewers (millions)	TV Rating	Conference	Location
1	December 7, 4:00pm	No. 4 Georgia (East)	10	No. 2 LSU (West)	37	CBS	13.70	7.9	SEC	Mercedes-Benz Stadium, Atlanta, GA
2	December 7, 8:00pm	No. 1 Ohio State (East)	34	No. 8 Wisconsin (West)	21	FOX	13.55	7.6	Big Ten	Lucas Oil Stadium, Indianapolis, IN
3	December 7, 12:00pm	No. 7 Baylor (No. 2 seed)	23	No. 6 Oklahoma (No. 1 seed)	30	ABC	8.70	5.5	Big 12	AT&T Stadium, Arlington, TX
4	December 6, 8:00pm	No. 5 Utah (South)	15	No. 13 Oregon (North)	37	ABC	5.86	3.5	Pac-12	Levi's Stadium, Santa Clara, CA
5	December 7, 7:30pm	No. 23 Virginia (Coastal)	17	No. 3 Clemson (Atlantic)	62	ABC	3.97	2.4	ACC	Bank of America Stadium, Charlotte, NC
6	December 7, 3:30pm	No. 20 Cincinnati (East)	24	No. 17 Memphis (West)	29	ABC	2.88	1.9	American	Liberty Bowl Memorial Stadium, Memphis, TN
7	December 7, 12:00pm	Louisiana (West)	38	No. 21 Appalachian State (East)	45	ESPN	0.73	0.5	Sun Belt	Kidd Brewer Stadium, Boone, NC
8	December 7, 4:00pm	Hawaii (West)	10	No. 19 Boise State (Mountain)	31	ESPN	0.55	0.4	MW	Albertsons Stadium, Boise, ID
9	December 7, 12:00pm	Miami (OH) (East)	26	Central Michigan (West)	21	ESPN2	0.36	0.2	MAC	Ford Field, Detroit, MI
10	December 7, 1:30pm	UAB (West)	6	Florida Atlantic (East)	49	CBSSN	n.a.	n.a.	C-USA	FAU Stadium, Boca Raton, FL

=== Most watched non-CFP bowl games ===
All times Eastern. Rankings are from the CFP Rankings.

Rank	Game	Date	Matchup				Network	Viewers (millions)	TV Rating	Location
1	Rose Bowl	January 1, 2020, 5:00pm	No. 6 Oregon	28	No. 8 Wisconsin	27	ESPN	16.3	8.7	Rose Bowl, Pasadena, CA
2	Citrus Bowl	January 1, 2020, 1:00pm	No. 13 Alabama	35	No. 14 Michigan	16	ABC	14.0	8.0	Camping World Stadium, Orlando, FL
3	Sugar Bowl	January 1, 2020, 8:30pm	No. 5 Georgia	26	No. 7 Baylor	14	ESPN	10.2	5.7	Mercedes-Benz Superdome, New Orleans, LA
4	Cotton Bowl Classic	December 28, 2019, 12:00pm	No. 10 Penn State	53	No. 17 Memphis	39	ESPN	6.2	3.8	AT&T Stadium, Arlington, TX
5	Orange Bowl	December 30, 2019, 8:00pm	No. 9 Florida	36	No. 24 Virginia	28	ESPN	6.1	3.5	Hard Rock Stadium, Miami, FL
6	Alamo Bowl	December 31, 2019, 7:30pm	Texas	38	No. 11 Utah	10	ESPN	5.6	3.1	Alamodome, San Antonio, TX
7	Texas Bowl	December 27, 2019, 7:30pm	No. 25 Oklahoma State	21	Texas A&M	24	ESPN	4.9	2.8	NRG Stadium, Houston, TX
8	Gator Bowl	January 2, 2020, 7:00pm	Tennessee	23	Indiana	22	ESPN	4.3	2.6	TIAA Bank Field, Jacksonville, FL
9	Camping World Bowl	December 28, 2019, 12:00pm	No. 15 Notre Dame	33	Iowa State	9	ABC	4.2	2.65	Camping World Stadium, Orlando, FL
10	Outback Bowl	January 1, 2020, 1:00pm	No. 12 Auburn	24	No. 18 Minnesota	31	ESPN	4.0	2.4	Raymond James Stadium, Tampa, FL

=== College Football Playoff ===
All times Eastern. Rankings are from the CFP Rankings.

Game	Date	Matchup				Network	Viewers (millions)	TV Rating	Location
Peach Bowl (semifinal)	December 28, 2019, 4:00pm	No. 4 Oklahoma	28	No. 1 LSU	63	ESPN	17.2	9.5	Mercedes-Benz Stadium, Atlanta, GA
Fiesta Bowl (semifinal)	December 28, 2019, 8:00pm	No. 3 Clemson	29	No. 2 Ohio State	23	ESPN	21.2	11.1	State Farm Stadium, Glendale, AZ
National Championship	January 13, 2020, 8:00pm	No. 3 Clemson	25	No. 1 LSU	42	ESPN	25.59	14.3	Mercedes-Benz Superdome, New Orleans, LA

== Attendances ==
Team	G	Total	Average
Air Force	6	162,505	27,084
Akron	6	107,752	17,959
Alabama	7	707,817	101,117
Appalachian State	7	166,640	23,806
Arizona	6	237,194	39,532
Arizona State	7	344,161	49,166
Arkansas	7	356,517	50,931
Arkansas State	6	124,017	20,670
Army West Point	6	185,935	30,989
Auburn	7	600,355	85,765
Ball State	6	59,545	9,924
Baylor	7	318,621	45,517
Boise State	7	224,490	32,070
Boston College	6	205,111	34,185
Bowling Green	6	91,768	15,295
Buffalo	6	98,504	16,417
BYU	6	357,281	59,547
California	6	254,597	42,433
Central Michigan	6	81,386	13,564
Charlotte	6	73,915	12,319
Cincinnati	6	215,908	35,985
Clemson	7	566,074	80,868
Coastal Carolina	6	90,112	15,019
Colorado	6	297,435	49,573
Colorado State	6	140,025	23,338
Duke	6	154,867	25,811
East Carolina	6	198,804	33,134
Eastern Michigan	5	85,127	17,025
FIU	6	83,242	13,874
Florida Atlantic	8	140,857	17,607
Florida	6	508,103	84,684
Florida State	7	378,136	54,019
Fresno State	6	189,310	31,552
Georgia Southern	6	83,785	13,964
Georgia	7	649,722	92,817
Georgia State	6	103,116	17,186
Georgia Tech	7	312,194	44,599
Hawaii	9	211,090	23,454
Houston	5	127,592	25,518
Illinois	7	256,110	36,587
Indiana	6	247,463	41,244
Iowa	7	458,897	65,557
Iowa State	7	418,561	59,794
Kansas	7	237,122	33,875
Kansas State	7	341,726	48,818
Kent State	5	64,109	12,822
Kentucky	8	425,023	53,128
Louisiana–Monroe	6	100,367	16,728
Liberty	6	109,631	18,272
Louisiana	7	127,418	18,203
Louisiana Tech	6	122,631	20,439
Louisville	6	299,475	49,913
LSU	7	705,892	100,842
Marshall	7	162,329	23,190
Maryland	6	226,871	37,812
Massachusetts	6	56,987	9,498
Memphis	7	271,710	38,816
Miami Hurricanes	6	316,971	52,829
Miami RedHawks	5	88,969	17,794
Michigan	7	780,215	111,459
Michigan State	7	474,731	67,819
Middle Tennessee	6	85,516	14,253
Minnesota	7	323,330	46,190
Mississippi State	7	393,277	56,182
Missouri	7	379,119	54,160
Navy	6	191,819	31,970
NC State	7	395,264	56,466
Nebraska	7	625,436	89,348
Nevada	6	97,080	16,180
New Mexico	6	94,483	15,747
New Mexico State	5	89,523	17,905
North Carolina	6	303,000	50,500
North Texas	6	128,150	21,358
Northern Illinois	5	42,590	8,518
Northwestern	7	264,149	37,736
Notre Dame	7	534,017	76,288
Ohio	6	99,398	16,566
Ohio State	7	723,679	103,383
Oklahoma	6	499,533	83,256
Oklahoma State	6	328,902	54,817
Old Dominion	6	109,402	18,234
Ole Miss	7	337,631	48,233
Oregon	7	375,136	53,591
Oregon State	6	194,546	32,424
Penn State	7	739,747	105,678
Pittsburgh	7	303,606	43,372
Purdue	7	378,147	54,021
Rice	7	155,486	22,212
Rutgers	7	210,573	30,082
San Diego State	6	179,376	29,896
San Jose State	6	92,374	15,396
SMU	6	141,798	23,633
South Alabama	6	97,933	16,322
South Carolina	7	545,737	77,962
South Florida	7	222,759	31,823
Southern California	6	356,150	59,358
Southern Miss	5	123,826	24,765
Stanford	7	259,123	37,018
Syracuse	6	252,985	42,164
TCU	6	257,288	42,881
Temple	7	206,217	29,460
Tennessee	8	702,912	87,864
Texas	6	577,834	96,306
Texas A&M	7	711,258	101,608
Texas State	6	102,840	17,140
Texas Tech	6	320,510	53,418
Toledo	6	122,393	20,399
Troy	6	140,996	23,499
Tulane	6	121,628	20,271
Tulsa	6	112,443	18,741
UAB	6	148,355	24,726
UCF	6	262,728	43,788
UCLA	6	263,092	43,849
UConn	6	109,297	18,216
UNLV	6	119,186	19,864
Utah	7	325,237	46,462
Utah State	6	117,655	19,609
UTEP	6	102,558	17,093
UTSA	6	119,424	19,904
Vanderbilt	7	184,016	26,288
Virginia	7	335,040	47,863
Virginia Tech	7	408,049	58,293
Wake Forest	7	188,996	26,999
Washington	7	477,668	68,238
Washington State	6	171,247	28,541
West Virginia	6	335,443	55,907
Western Kentucky	6	91,148	15,191
Western Michigan	6	107,619	17,937
Wisconsin	7	535,301	76,472
Wyoming	6	138,042	23,007

== See also ==
- 2019 NCAA Division I FCS football season
- 2019 NCAA Division II football season
- 2019 NCAA Division III football season
- 2019 NAIA football season
