= 2019 NC State Wolfpack football team =

American college football season

2019 NC State Wolfpack football
- Conference: Atlantic Coast Conference
- Atlantic Division
- Record: 4–8 (1–7 ACC)
- Head coach: Dave Doeren (7th season)
- Co-offensive coordinators: Desmond Kitchings (1st season); George McDonald (1st season)
- Offensive scheme: Multiple
- Co-defensive coordinators: Dave Huxtable (7th season); Tony Gibson (1st season)
- Base defense: Multiple
- Home stadium: Carter–Finley Stadium

Uniform
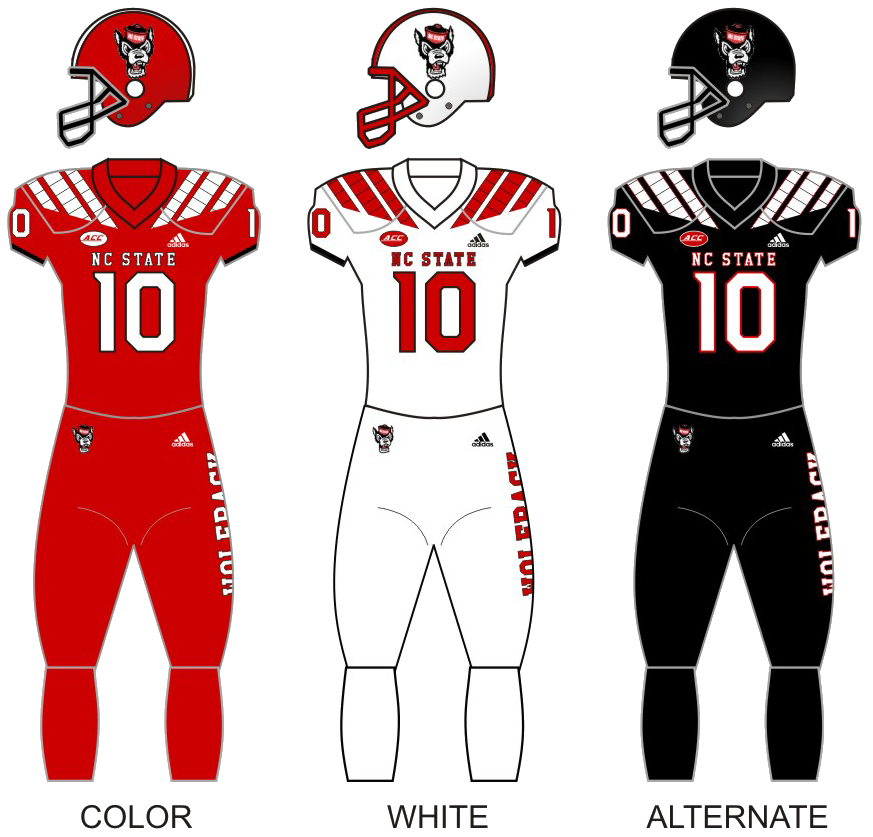

2019 Atlantic Coast Conference football standings
	Conf.			Overall
Team	W		L	W		L
Atlantic Division
No. 2 Clemson xy$^	8	–	0	14	–	1
Louisville	5	–	3	8	–	5
Wake Forest	4	–	4	8	–	5
Boston College	4	–	4	6	–	7
Florida State	4	–	4	6	–	7
Syracuse	2	–	6	5	–	7
NC State	1	–	7	4	–	8
Coastal Division
Virginia x	6	–	2	9	–	5
Virginia Tech	5	–	3	8	–	5
Pittsburgh	4	–	4	8	–	5
North Carolina	4	–	4	7	–	6
Miami (FL)	4	–	4	6	–	7
Duke	3	–	5	5	–	7
Georgia Tech	2	–	6	3	–	9
Championship: Clemson 62, Virginia 17
^ – College Football Playoff participant; $ – Conference champion; x – Division champion/co-champions; Rankings from AP Poll

The 2019 NC State Wolfpack football team represented North Carolina State University during the 2019 NCAA Division I FBS football season. The Wolfpack played their home games at Carter–Finley Stadium in Raleigh, North Carolina and competed in the Atlantic Division of the Atlantic Coast Conference. They were led by seventh-year head coach Dave Doeren. They finished the season 4–8, 1–7 in ACC play to finish in seventh place in the Atlantic Division.

== Preseason ==
=== Preseason media poll ===
In the preseason ACC media poll, NC State was predicted to finish in fourth in the Atlantic Division.

== Schedule ==
NC State announced its 2019 football schedule on January 16, 2019. The 2019 regular season schedule consisted of seven home games and five away games. The Wolfpack hosted ACC foes Clemson, Louisville, North Carolina, and Syracuse, and traveled to Boston College, Florida State, Georgia Tech, and Wake Forest.

The Wolfpack hosted three of the four non-conference opponents—Ball State from the Mid-American Conference, East Carolina from the American Athletic Conference, and Western Carolina from Division I FCS—and traveled to West Virginia from the Big 12.

Date	Time	Opponent	Site	TV	Result	Attendance
August 31	12:00 p.m.	East Carolina*	Carter–Finley Stadium; Raleigh, NC (Victory Barrel)	ACCN	W 34–6	57,633
September 7	12:30 p.m.	Western Carolina*	Carter–Finley Stadium; Raleigh, NC	ACCRSN	W 41–0	55,681
September 14	12:00 p.m.	at West Virginia*	Mountaineer Field; Morgantown, WV	FS1	L 27–44	57,052
September 21	7:00 p.m.	Ball State*	Carter–Finley Stadium; Raleigh, NC	ESPNU	W 34–23	57,702
September 28	7:30 p.m.	at Florida State	Doak Campbell Stadium; Tallahassee, FL	ACCN	L 13–31	60,351
October 10	8:00 p.m.	Syracuse	Carter–Finley Stadium; Raleigh, NC	ESPN	W 16–10	55,860
October 19	12:00 p.m.	at Boston College	Alumni Stadium; Chestnut Hill, MA	ACCRSN	L 24–45	30,275
November 2	12:00 p.m.	at No. 23 Wake Forest	BB&T Field; Winston-Salem, NC (rivalry)	ESPN	L 10–44	31,119
November 9	7:30 p.m.	No. 5 Clemson^{†}	Carter–Finley Stadium; Raleigh, NC (Textile Bowl)	ABC	L 10–55	57,886
November 16	7:30 p.m.	Louisville	Carter–Finley Stadium; Raleigh, NC	ACCN	L 20–34	54,089
November 21	8:00 p.m.	at Georgia Tech	Bobby Dodd Stadium; Atlanta, GA	ESPN	L 26–28	38,198
November 30	7:00 p.m.	North Carolina	Carter–Finley Stadium; Raleigh, NC (rivalry)	ACCN	L 10–41	56,413
*Non-conference game; ^{†}Homecoming; Rankings from AP Poll and CFP Rankings after November 5 released prior to game; All times are in Eastern time

Schedule source:

== Coaching staff ==
Name	Title
Dave Doeren	Head Coach
Desmond Kitchings	Co-offensive coordinator/running backs
George McDonald	Co-offensive coordinator/wide receivers
Dave Huxtable	Co-defensive coordinator/linebackers
Tony Gibson	Co-defensive coordinator/safeties
George Barlow	Assistant head coach/cornerbacks
Aaron Henry	Nickels
John Garrison	Offensive line
Kevin Patrick	Defensive line
Kurt Roper	Quarterbacks
Todd Goebbel	Special teams coordinator/tight ends/fullbacks
Billy Dicken	Defense Quality Control

== Roster ==
2018 NC State Wolfpack football team roster
Quarterbacks: 7 Matthew McKay – sophomore (6'4, 214) (redshirt); 13 Devin Leary – freshman (6'2, 212) (redshirt); 14 Jamie Shaw – freshman (6'4, 222); 15 Ty Evans – freshman (6'3, 200); 16 Bailey Hockman – sophomore (6'2, 208) (redshirt); Running backs: 5 Damontay Rhem – senior (5'11, 220) (redshirt); 8 Ricky Person Jr. – sophomore (6'1, 220); 20 Jordan Houston – freshman (5'10, 185); 24 Zonovan Knight – freshman (6'0, 197); 26 Trent Pennix – freshman (6'2, 224) (redshirt); 30 David Wetherington – freshman (6'0, 204); 33 Delbert Mimms III – freshman (5'11, 222); 35 Dalton Counts – sophomore (6'0, 215) (redshirt); 36 Demarcus Jones II – freshman (5'10, 214); 38 Will Dabbs – junior (5'11, 191) (redshirt); Wide receivers: 3 Emeka Emezie – junior (6'3, 210); 4 Tabari Hines – graduate (5'10, 185); 19 C.J. Riley – junior (6'4, 211) (redshirt); 27 Nicholas Treco – freshman (5'11, 195); 33 Jackson DeSilva – freshman (6'2, 185); 37 Tyler Dabbs – junior (5'10, 186) (redshirt); 80 Justin Dunn – freshman (6'1, 208) (redshirt); 82 Max Fisher – sophomore (6'2, 202) (redshirt); 83 Eric Collins – junior (5'9, 180) (redshirt); 84 Jasiah Provillon – freshman (6'3, 208) (redshirt); 85 Keyon Lesane – freshman (6'0, 194); 86 Christopher Toudle – freshman (6'3, 222); 87 Thayer Thomas – sophomore (6'1, 193) (redshirt); 85 Devin Carter – freshman (6'4, 209) (redshirt); Tight ends: 6 Cary Angeline – junior (6'7, 250) (redshirt); 28 Dylan Parham – junior (6'5, 243) (redshirt); 39 Matthew Alderfer– freshman (6'35, 242) (redshirt); 42 Dylan Autenrieth – junior (6'4, 240) (redshirt); 45 Camden Woods – freshman (6'3, 242) (redshirt); 46 Quinn York – freshman (6'4, 236); 48 Kameron Walker – freshman (6'5, 242); 89 Thomas Ruocchio – junior (6'3, 245) (redshirt); Punters: 98 Mackenzie Morgan – sophomore (6'2, 215) (redshirt); 99 Trenton Gill – sophomore (6'4, 217) (redshirt)	Offensive lineman: 50 Grant Gibson – sophomore (6'1, 305) (redshirt); 52 Kendall Brown – junior (6'4, 295) (redshirt); 54 Dylan McMahon – freshman (6'3, 294); 55 Tyrone Riley – graduate (6'6, 296); 56 Kollin Byers – sophomore (6'4, 267) (redshirt); 57 Zovon Lindsay – freshman (6'4, 291); 59 Liam Ryan – sophomore (6'2, 297) (redshirt); 61 Bo Ressler – freshman (6'7, 290) (redshirt); 62 Bryson Speas – sophomore (6'4, 290) (redshirt); 65 Timothy McKay – freshman (6'4, 306); 66 Joshua Fedd-Jackson – junior (6'3, 323); 67 Justin Witt – junior (6'6, 310) (redshirt); 68 Charles Fletcher – sophomore (6'2, 300) (redshirt); 70 Walter Karstens – freshman (6'5, 334); 71 Joe Sculthorpe – junior (6'3, 300) (redshirt); 72 Riley Williams – freshman (6'6, 300); 73 Justin Chase – junior (6'5, 315) (redshirt); 74 Emanuel McGirt Jr. – graduate (6'6, 305); 75 Jalynn Stricklan – freshman (6'6, 329) (redshirt); 78 Gabriel Gonzalez – freshman (6'5, 290) (redshirt); 79 Ikem Ekwonu – freshman (6'4, 308); Defensive lineman: 1 James Smith-Williams – graduate (6'3, 265); 29 Alim McNeill – sophomore (6'2, 315); 42 Danny Blakeman – sophomore (6'2, 275) (redshirt); 44 Joshua Harris – freshman (6'4, 352); 52 Ibrahim Kante – sophomore (6'4, 256) (redshirt); 55 Deonte Holden – graduate (6'4, 249); 56 Val Martin – junior (6'2, 297) (redshirt); 58 C.J. Clark – freshman (6'3, 298); 75 Tyree Green – junior (6'2, 265); 89 Terrell Dawkins– freshman (6'4, 237); 90 Savion Jackson – freshman (6'3, 265); 92 Larrell Murchison – senior (6'3, 291) (redshirt); 94 Jeffrey Gunter – junior (6'4, 260); 95 Derrick Eason – sophomore (6'4, 286) (redshirt); 96 Dante Johnson – sophomore (6'3, 290) (redshirt); 97 Xavier Lyas – sophomore (6'4, 239) (redshirt); 99 Joseph Boletepeli – freshman (6'4, 262) (redshirt)	Placekickers: 38 Christopher Dunn – sophomore (5'8, 180); 90 Collin Smith – freshman (5'10, 166); 95 Nolan Parris – freshman (6'3, 192); 96 Andrew Weil – freshman (5'9, 165); Linebackers: 2 Louis Acceus – junior (5'11, 223); 11 Payton Wilson – sophomore (6'4, 235); 12 Brock Miller – junior (6'3, 238) (redshirt); 15 Calvin Hart Jr. – freshman (6'1, 225) (redshirt); 31 Vi Jones – junior (6'3, 230); 32 Drake Thomas – freshman (6'0, 236); 35 Jaylon Scott – freshman (6'1, 237); 41 Isaiah Moore – sophomore (6'2, 240) (redshirt); 47 Alex Gray – freshman (6'2, 220) (redshirt); 49 Seth Williams – freshman (6'2, 238) (redshirt); Defensive backs: 4 Nick McCloud – senior (6'1, 190); 6 Taiyon Palmer – freshman (5'11, 185) (redshirt); 7 Chris Ingram – junior (6'0, 186); 8 Teshaun Smith– sophomore (6'3, 191); 10 Tanner Ingle – sophomore (5'10, 188); 13 Tyler Baker-Williams – sophomore (6'1, 205); 14 De'von Graves – sophomore (6'1, 197); 20 Jalen Frazier – freshman (6'3, 216); 21 Stephen Griffin – senior (6'3, 206) (redshirt); 22 Isaiah Stallings – junior (6'4, 220) (redshirt); 24 Malik Dunlap – freshman (6'3, 216) (redshirt); 25 Khalid Martin – freshman (6'0, 200); 27 Shyheim Battle – freshman (6'2, 183); 28 Kishawn Miller – senior (5'9, 176); 30 Cayman Czesak – sophomore (6'2, 206) (redshirt); 31 Jarius Morehead – senior (6'1, 215) (redshirt); 33 Isaac Duffy – freshman (5'10, 180); 33 Dalton Counts – freshman (6'0, 212) (redshirt); 36 William Brown III – graduate (5'8, 187); 37 Michael Badsen – freshman (6'2, 214); Long snappers: 91 Joe Shimko – freshman (6'0, 205); 92 Jackson Quiggle – junior (5'11, 226) (redshirt)

Roster Source:

== Game summaries ==
=== East Carolina ===
East Carolina Pirates at NC State Wolfpack − Game summary

Quarter	1	2	3	4	Total
Pirates	3	0	0	3	6
Wolfpack	7	10	7	10	34

at Carter–Finley Stadium • Raleigh, NC

- Date: August 31, 2019
- Game time: 12:00 p.m.
- Game weather: Temperature: 88 °F (31 °C) • Weather: Sunny
- Game attendance: 57,633
- Referee: Adam Savoie
- TV announcers (ACCN): Wes Durham, Roddy Jones, Eric Wood

Game information

First quarter

- 08:34 NCSU TD – Zonovan Knight 9 yard run (Christopher Dunn PAT)
- 06:04 ECU FG – Jake Verity 47 yard field goal

Second quarter

- 10:01 NCSU FG – Christopher Dunn 27 yard field goal
- 00:51 NCSU TD – Matthew McKay 4 yard run (Christopher Dunn PAT)

Third quarter

- 09:48 NCSU TD – Matthew McKay 48 yard pass to Tabari Hines (Christopher Dunn PAT)

Fourth quarter

- 12:21 NCSU TD – Matthew McKay 21 yard run (Christopher Dunn PAT)
- 04:14 NCSU FG – Christopher Dunn 34 yard field goal
- 01:18 ECU FG – Jake Verity 31 yard field goal

Top passers

- ECU – Holton Ahlers: 22–39, 168 yards
- NCSU – Matthew McKay: 25–37, 308 yards, 1 TD

Top rushers

- ECU – Darius Pinnix: 11 rushes, 23 yards
- NCSU – Zonovan Knight: 9 rushes, 42 yards, 1 TD

Top Receiving

- ECU – Blake Proehl: 5 receptions, 45 yards
- NCSU – Thayer Thomas: 6 receptions, 83 yards

=== Western Carolina ===
Western Carolina Catamounts at NC State Wolfpack − Game summary

Quarter	1	2	3	4	Total
Catamounts	0	0	0	0	0
Wolfpack	3	21	10	7	41

at Carter–Finley Stadium • Raleigh, NC

- Date: September 7, 2019
- Game time: 12:30 p.m.
- Game weather: Temperature: 85 °F (29 °C) • Wind: WNW 4 mph (6.4 km/h) • Weather: Sunny
- Game attendance: 55,681
- Referee: Stuart Mullins
- TV announcers (ACCRSN): Tom Werme, James Bates

Game information

First quarter

- 05:06 NCSU FG – Christopher Dunn 32 yard field goal

Second quarter

- 08:24 NCSU TD – Ricky Person Jr. 6 yard run (Christopher Dunn PAT)
- 03:56 NCSU TD – Zonovan Knight 4 yard run (Christopher Dunn PAT)
- 00:16 NCSU TD – Matthew McKay 1 yard pass to Cary Angeline (Christopher Dunn PAT)

Third quarter

- 11:35 NCSU FG – Christopher Dunn 25 yard field goal
- 01:18 NCSU TD – Zonovan Knight 2 yard run (Christopher Dunn PAT)

Fourth quarter

- 10:50 NCSU TD – Jordan Houston 3 yard run (Christopher Dunn PAT)

Top passers

- WCU – Will Jones: 15–27, 98 yards
- NCSU – Matthew McKay: 18–28, 200 yards, 1 TD

Top rushers

- WCU – Connell Young: 7 rushes, 26 yards
- NCSU – Zonovan Knight: 18 rushes, 119 yards, 2 TD

Top Receiving

- WCU – Mahari Stribling: 3 receptions, 28 yards
- NCSU – Cary Angeline: 4 receptions, 47 yards, 1 TD

=== At West Virginia ===
NC State Wolfpack at West Virginia Mountaineers − Game summary

Quarter	1	2	3	4	Total
Wolfpack	7	14	6	0	27
Mountaineers	14	7	10	13	44

at Mountaineer Field • Morgantown, WV

- Date: September 14, 2019
- Game time: 12:00 p.m.
- Game weather: Temperature: 78 °F (26 °C) • Wind: SSW 5 mph (8.0 km/h) • Weather: Cloudy
- Game attendance: 57,052
- Referee: Jeff Flanagan
- TV announcers (FS1): Eric Collins, Ben Leber

Game information

First quarter

- 09:06 WVU TD – Austin Kendall 20 yard pass to Sam James (Evan Staley PAT)
- 04:49 NCSU TD – Matthew McKay 8 yard pass to Thomas (Christopher Dunn PAT)
- 03:54 WVU TD – Kennedy McKoy 23 yard run (Evan Staley PAT)

Second quarter

- 12:11 NCSU TD – Jordan Houston 1 yard run (Christopher Dunn PAT)
- 03:13 NCSU TD – Thayer Thomas 18 yard pass to Cary Angeline (Christopher Dunn PAT)
- 00:34 WVU TD – Austin Kendall 13 yard pass to George Campbell (Evan Staley PAT)

Third quarter

- 10:42 WVU FG – Evan Staley 23 yard field goal
- 06:24 WVU TD – Kennedy McKoy 5 yard run (Evan Staley PAT)
- 02:14 NCSU FG – Christopher Dunn 41 yard field goal
- 00:10 NCSU FG – Christopher Dunn 37 yard field goal

Fourth quarter

- 12:24 WVU TD – Austin Kendall 9 yard pass to Gary Jennings Jr. (Evan Staley PAT)
- 06:24 WVU TD – Leddie Brown 3 yard run (2 point conversion failed)

Top passers

- NCSU – Matthew McKay: 23–48, 207 yards, 1 TD
- WVU – Austin Kendall: 27–40, 272 yards, 3 TD

Top rushers

- NCSU – Zonovan Knight: 12 rushes, 72 yards
- WVU – Kennedy McKoy: 10 rushes, 66 yards, 2 TD

Top Receiving

- NCSU – Emeka Emezie: 12 receptions, 103 yards
- WVU – Sam James: 9 receptions, 155 yards, 1 TD

=== Ball State ===
Ball State Cardinals at NC State Wolfpack − Game summary

Quarter	1	2	3	4	Total
Cardinals	7	0	6	10	23
Wolfpack	6	14	7	7	34

at Carter–Finley Stadium • Raleigh, NC

- Date: September 21, 2019
- Game time: 7:00 p.m.
- Game weather: Temperature: 84 °F (29 °C) • Wind: S 6 mph (9.7 km/h) • Weather: Clear
- Game attendance: 57,702
- Referee: Jerry Magallanes
- TV announcers (ESPNU): Anish Shroff, Ahmad Brooks

Game information

First quarter

- 08:29 NCSU FG – Christopher Dunn 39 yard field goal
- 05:28 BALL TD – Justin Hall 11 yard run (Ryan Rimmler PAT)
- 00:06 NCSU FG – Christopher Dunn 34 yard field goal

Second quarter

- 06:18 NCSU TD – Ricky Person Jr. 3 yard run (Christopher Dunn PAT)
- 01:38 NCSU TD – Matthew McKay 5 yard run (Christopher Dunn PAT)

Third quarter

- 13:03 NCSU TD – Thayer Thomas 76 yard punt return (Christopher Dunn PAT)
- 09:41 BALL FG – Ryan Rimmler 43 yard field goal
- 00:41 BALL FG – Ryan Rimmler 43 yard field goal

Fourth quarter

- 12:21 BALL FG – Ryan Rimmler 28 yard field goal
- 08:41 NCSU TD – Matthew McKay 3 yard run (Christopher Dunn PAT)
- 04:49 BALL TD – Caleb Huntley 2 yard run (Ryan Rimmler PAT)

Top passers

- BALL - Drew Plitt: 35–57, 333 yards
- NCSU - Matthew McKay: 17–30, 175 yards

Top rushers

- BALL - Caleb Huntley: 13 rushes, 52 yards, 1 TD
- NCSU - Jordan Houston: 6 rushes, 55 yards

Top Receiving

- BALL - Justin Hall: 8 receptions, 73 yards
- NCSU - Thayer Thomas: 4 receptions, 51 yards

=== At Florida State ===
NC State Wolfpack at Florida State Seminoles − Game summary

Quarter	1	2	3	4	Total
Wolfpack	0	6	0	7	13
Seminoles	3	14	7	7	31

at Doak Campbell Stadium • Tallahassee, FL

- Date: September 28, 2019
- Game time: 7:30 p.m.
- Game weather: Temperature: 88 °F (31 °C) • Wind: SE 8 mph (13 km/h) • Weather: Clear
- Game attendance: 60,351
- Referee: Jeff Maconaghy
- TV announcers (ACCN): Dave O’Brien, Tim Hasselbeck, Lericia Harris

Game information

First quarter

- 05:40 FSU FG – Ricky Aguayo 37 yard field goal

Second quarter

- 14:20 NCSU FG – Christopher Dunn 29 yard field goal
- 06:25 NCSU FG – Christopher Dunn 26 yard field goal
- 04:29 FSU TD – Alex Hornibrook 43 yard pass to Tamorrion Terry (Ricky Aguayo PAT)
- 00:58 FSU TD – Alex Hornibrook 40 yard pass to Ontaria Wilson (Ricky Aguayo PAT)

Third quarter

- 00:59 FSU TD – Alex Hornibrook 9 yard pass to Tamorrion Terry (Ricky Aguayo PAT)

Fourth quarter

- 13:04 NCSU TD – Bailey Hockman 3 yard pass to Emeka Emezie (Christopher Dunn PAT)
- 09:13 FSU TD – Cam Akers 41 yard run (Ricky Aguayo PAT)

Top passers

- NCSU - Bailey Hockman: 21–40, 208 yards, 1 TD
- FSU - Alex Hornibrook: 29–40, 316 yards, 3 TD

Top rushers

- NCSU - Jordan Houston: 9 rushes, 61 yards
- FSU - Cam Akers: 17 rushes, 83 yards, 1 TD

Top Receiving

- NCSU - Devin Carter: 4 receptions, 68 yards
- FSU - Ontaria Wilson: 4 receptions, 91 yards, 1 TD

=== Syracuse ===
Syracuse Orange at NC State Wolfpack − Game summary

Quarter	1	2	3	4	Total
Orange	0	0	3	7	10
Wolfpack	6	7	3	0	16

at Carter–Finley Stadium • Raleigh, NC

- Date: October 10, 2019
- Game time: 8:00 p.m.
- Game weather: Temperature: 73 °F (23 °C) • Wind: ENE 5 mph (8.0 km/h) • Weather: Mostly Clear
- Game attendance: 55,860
- Referee: Riley Johnson
- TV announcers (ESPN): Adam Amin, Matt Hasselbeck, Pat McAfee, Molly McGrath

Game information

First quarter

- 11:08 NCSU FG – Christopher Dunn 39 yard field goal
- 05:17 NCSU FG – Christopher Dunn 43 yard field goal

Second quarter

- 01:16 NCSU TD – Thayer Thomas 32 yard pass to Trent Pennix (Christopher Dunn PAT)

Third quarter

- 04:18 NCSU FG – Christopher Dunn 23 yard field goal
- 00:54 CUSE FG – Andre Szmyt 32 yard field goal

Fourth quarter

- 03:00 CUSE TD – Tommy DeVito 2 yard pass to Courtney Jackson (Andre Szmyt PAT)

Top passers

- CUSE - Tommy DeVito: 29–39, 300 yards, 1 TD
- NCSU - Bailey Hockman: 16–27, 205 yards

Top rushers

- CUSE - Moe Neal: 8 rushes, 31 yards
- NCSU - Zonovan Knight: 15 rushes, 61 yards

Top Receiving

- CUSE - Trishton Jackson: 9 receptions, 106 yards, 1 TD
- NCSU - Emeka Emezie: 5 receptions, 77 yards

=== At Boston College ===
NC State Wolfpack at Boston College Eagles − Game summary

Quarter	1	2	3	4	Total
Wolfpack	0	3	7	14	24
Eagles	7	17	7	14	45

at Alumni Stadium • Chestnut Hill, MA

- Date: October 19, 2019
- Game time: 12:00 p.m.
- Game weather: Temperature: 50 °F (10 °C) • Wind: W 5 mph (8.0 km/h) • Weather: Sunny
- Game attendance: 30,275
- Referee: Jeff Flanagan
- TV announcers (ACCRSN): Evan Lepler, Dave Archer, Kelsey Wingert

Game information

First quarter

- 05:36 BC TD – Jason Maitre 8 yard interception return (Aaron Boumerhi PAT)

Second quarter

- 11:51 NCSU FG – Christopher Dunn 28 yard field goal
- 07:23 BC FG – Aaron Boumerhi 27 yard field goal
- 05:07 BC TD – David Bailey 54 yard run (Aaron Boumerhi PAT)
- 02:51 BC TD – David Bailey 48 yard run (Aaron Boumerhi PAT)

Third quarter

- 06:02 BC TD – A. J. Dillon 2 yard run (Aaron Boumerhi PAT)
- 03:35 NCSU TD – Devin Leary 6 yard pass to Thayer Thomas (Christopher Dunn PAT)

Fourth quarter

- 14:32 BC TD – A. J. Dillon 3 yard run (Aaron Boumerhi PAT)
- 08:49 NCSU TD – Devin Leary 6 yard pass to Thayer Thomas (Christopher Dunn PAT)
- 05:28 BC TD – A. J. Dillon 8 yard run (Aaron Boumerhi PAT)
- 08:49 NCSU TD – Devin Leary 15 yard pass to Cary Angeline (Christopher Dunn PAT)

Top passers

- NCSU - Devin Leary: 15–33, 259 yards, 3 TD
- BC - Dennis Grosel: 6–15, 103 yards

Top rushers

- NCSU - Jordan Houston: 7 rushes, 34 yards
- BC - A. J. Dillon: 34 rushes, 223 yards, 3 TD

Top Receiving

- NCSU - Devin Carter: 6 receptions, 140 yards
- BC - Hunter Long: 3 receptions, 84 yards

=== At Wake Forest ===
NC State Wolfpack at Wake Forest Demon Deacons − Game summary

Quarter	1	2	3	4	Total
Wolfpack	0	10	0	0	10
No. 23 Demon Deacons	21	13	10	0	44

at BB&T Field • Winston-Salem, NC

- Date: November 2, 2019
- Game time: 12:00 p.m.
- Game weather: Temperature: 50 °F (10 °C) • Wind: N 4 mph (6.4 km/h) • Weather: Sunny
- Game attendance: 31,119
- Referee: Tra Black
- TV announcers (ESPN): Dave Pasch, Greg McElroy, Tom Luginbill

Game information

First quarter

- 08:34 WAKE TD – Jamie Newman 20 yard run (Nick Sciba PAT)
- 07:41 WAKE TD – Jamie Newman 5 yard pass to Jack Freudenthal (Nick Sciba PAT)
- 03:32 WAKE TD – Jamie Newman 2 yard run (Nick Sciba PAT)

Second quarter

- 12:26 WAKE FG – Nick Sciba 25 yard field goal
- 09:19 NCSU TD – Devin Leary 3 yard pass to Cary Angeline (Christopher Dunn PAT)
- 06:27 WAKE TD – Jamie Newman 2 yard pass to Jack Freudenthal (Nick Sciba PAT)
- 04:16 NCSU FG – Christopher Dunn 40 yard field goal
- 00:23 WAKE FG – Nick Sciba 34 yard field goal

Third quarter

- 13:38 WAKE TD – Jamie Newman 4 yard pass to Jack Freudenthal (Nick Sciba PAT)
- 09:59 WAKE FG – Nick Sciba 26 yard field goal

Fourth quarter

- No scoring plays

Top passers

- NCSU - Devin Leary: 17–45, 149 yards, 1 TD
- WAKE - Jamie Newman: 25–38, 287 yards, 3 TD

Top rushers

- NCSU - Jordan Houston: 11 rushes, 48 yards
- WAKE - Kenneth Walker III: 16 rushes, 56 yards

Top Receiving

- NCSU - Cary Angeline: 3 receptions, 46 yards, 1 TD
- WAKE - Kendall Hinton: 6 receptions, 93 yards

=== Clemson ===
Clemson Tigers at NC State Wolfpack − Game summary

Quarter	1	2	3	4	Total
No. 5 Tigers	28	14	7	6	55
Wolfpack	0	0	7	3	10

at Carter–Finley Stadium • Raleigh, NC

- Date: November 9, 2019
- Game time: 7:30 p.m.
- Game weather: Temperature: 45 °F (7 °C) • Wind: N 1 mph (1.6 km/h) • Weather: Clear
- Game attendance: 57,886
- Referee: Jeff Heaser
- TV announcers (ABC): Chris Fowler (play-by-play), Kirk Herbstreit (analyst), Maria Taylor (sideline)

Game information

First quarter

- 10:56 CLEM TD – Trevor Lawrence 7 yard run (B. T. Potter PAT)
- 05:00 CLEM TD – Trevor Lawrence 33 yard pass to Tee Higgins (B. T. Potter PAT)
- 03:31 CLEM TD – Trevor Lawrence 4 yard pass to Travis Etienne (B. T. Potter PAT)
- 01:31 CLEM TD – Travis Etienne 19 yard run (B. T. Potter PAT)

Second quarter

- 04:30 CLEM TD – John Simpson 1 yard run (B. T. Potter PAT)
- 00:45 CLEM TD – Trevor Lawrence 33 yard pass to Ross (B. T. Potter PAT)

Third quarter

- 13:04 NCSU TD – Zonovan Knight 53 yard run (Christopher Dunn PAT)
- 06:21 CLEM TD – Travis Etienne 8 yard run (B. T. Potter PAT)

Fourth quarter

- 13:43 NCSU FG – Christopher Dunn 46 yard field goal
- 00:11 CLEM TD – Michel Dukes 1 yard run (James Skalski missed PAT)

Top passers

- CLEM - Trevor Lawrence: 20–27, 276 yards, 3 TD
- NCSU - Devin Leary: 14–29, 166 yards

Top rushers

- CLEM - Travis Etienne: 14 rushes, 112 yards, 2 TD
- NCSU - Zonovan Knight: 12 rushes, 139 yards, 1 TD

Top Receiving

- CLEM - Justyn Ross: 4 receptions, 75 yards, 1 TD
- NCSU - Cary Angeline: 2 receptions, 53 yards

=== Louisville ===
Louisville Cardinals at NC State Wolfpack − Game summary

Quarter	1	2	3	4	Total
Cardinals	0	7	20	7	34
Wolfpack	0	10	0	10	20

at Carter–Finley Stadium • Raleigh, NC

- Date: November 16, 2019
- Game time: 7:30 p.m.
- Game weather: Temperature: 44 °F (7 °C) • Wind: NNE 17 mph (27 km/h) • Weather: Cloudy
- Game attendance: 54,089
- Referee: Stuart Mullins
- TV announcers (ACCN): Dave O’Brien, Tim Hasselbeck, Katie George

Game information

First quarter

- No scoring plays

Second quarter

- 11:24 LOU TD – Malik Cunningham 43 yard pass to Dez Fitzpatrick (Ryan Chalifoux PAT)
- 07:41 NCSU FG – Christopher Dunn 28 yard field goal
- 04:01 NCSU TD – Devin Leary 15 yard pass to Emeka Emezie (Christopher Dunn PAT)

Third quarter

- 13:41 LOU TD – Malik Cunningham 74 yard pass to Tutu Atwell (Ryan Chalifoux PAT)
- 12:30 LOU TD – Malik Cunningham 42 yard pass to Marshon Ford (Ryan Chalifoux missed PAT)
- 04:44 LOU TD – Malik Cunningham 1 yard pass to Ean Pfeifer (Ryan Chalifoux PAT)

Fourth quarter

- 14:11 NCSU TD – Devin Leary 16 yard pass to Ricky Person Jr. (Christopher Dunn PAT)
- 09:42 LOU TD – Ryan Chalifoux 7 yard pass to Marshon Ford (Ryan Chalifoux PAT)
- 04:19 NCSU FG – Christopher Dunn 27 yard field goal

Top passers

- LOU - Malik Cunningham: 13–20, 242 yards, 4 TD
- NCSU - Devin Leary: 24–44, 243 yards, 2 TD

Top rushers

- LOU - Javian Hawkins: 16 rushes, 67 yards
- NCSU - Zonovan Knight: 12 rushes, 61 yards

Top Receiving

- LOU - Tutu Atwell: 5 receptions, 110 yards, 1 TD
- NCSU - Emeka Emezie: 8 receptions, 90 yards, 1 TD

=== At Georgia Tech ===
NC State Wolfpack at Georgia Tech Yellow Jackets − Game summary

Quarter	1	2	3	4	Total
Wolfpack	0	3	10	13	26
Yellow Jackets	7	14	7	0	28

at Bobby Dodd Stadium • Atlanta, GA

- Date: November 21, 2019
- Game time: 8:00 p.m.
- Game weather: Temperature: 50 °F (10 °C) • Wind: Calm • Weather: Pleasant
- Game attendance: 38,198
- Referee: Gary Patterson
- TV announcers (ESPN): Adam Amin, Matt Hasselbeck, Pat McAfee, Molly McGrath

Game information

First quarter

- 13:44 GT TD – Ahmarean Brown 17 yard pass to James Graham (Brenton King PAT)

Second quarter

- 13:48 GT TD – Tobias Oliver 13-yard pass to James Graham (Brenton King PAT)
- 2:04 NCSU FG – Christopher Dunn 20-yard field goal
- 0:32 GT TD – Ahmarean Brown 11-yard pass to James Graham (Brenton King PAT)

Third quarter

- 10:15 NCSU TD – Zonovan Knight 7-yard run (Christopher Dunn PAT)
- 5:08 GT TD – James Graham 26-yard run (Brenton King PAT)
- 1:15 NCSU FG – Christopher Dunn 29-yard field goal

Fourth quarter

- 11:53 NCSU TD – Cary Angeline 4-yard pass to Devin Leary (Christopher Dunn PAT)
- 5:17 NCSU TD – Ricky Person 1-yard run (Devin Leary missed PAT)

Top passers

- NCSU - Devin Leary – 19/31, 227 yards, TD
- GT - James Graham – 7/15, 129 yards, 3 TD

Top rushers

- NCSU - Zonovan Knight – 18 carries, 100 yards, TD
- GT - Jordan Mason – 22 carries, 141 yards

Top Receiving

- NCSU - Tabari Hines – 4 receptions, 88 yards
- GT - Malachi Carter – 2 receptions, 74 yards

=== North Carolina ===
North Carolina Tar Heels at NC State Wolfpack − Game summary

Quarter	1	2	3	4	Total
Tar Heels	0	6	28	7	41
Wolfpack	3	7	0	0	10

at Carter–Finley Stadium • Raleigh, NC

- Date: November 30, 2019
- Game time: 7:00 p.m.
- Game weather: Temperature: 47 °F (8 °C) • Wind: NE 5 mph (8.0 km/h) • Weather: Rain
- Game attendance: 56,413
- Referee: Jeff Flanagan
- TV announcers (ACCN): Dave O'Brien, Tim Hasselbeck, Katie George

Game information

First quarter

- 5:59 NCSU FG – Christopher Dunn 30-yard field goal

Second quarter

- 9:09 NC FG – Noah Ruggles 20-yard field goal
- 4:13 NC FG – Noah Ruggles 32-yard field goal
- 1:25 NCSU TD – Tabari Hines 39-yard pass to Devin Leary (Christopher Dunn PAT)

Third quarter

- 10:07 NC TD – Javonte Williams 26-yard run (Noah Ruggles PAT)
- 5:00 NC TD – Javonte Williams 11-yard pass to Sam Howell (Noah Ruggles PAT)
- 2:08 NC TD – Javonte Williams 6-yard run (Noah Ruggles PAT)
- 0:20 NC TD – Dyami Brown 52-yard pass to Sam Howell (Noah Ruggles PAT)

Fourth quarter

- 7:34 NC TD – Dazz Newsome 13-yard pass to Sam Howell (Noah Ruggles PAT)

Top passers

- NC - Sam Howell – 23/33, 401 yards, 3 TD, INT
- NCSU - Devin Leary – 7/20, 98 yards, TD, 2 INT

Top rushers

- NC - Michael Carter – 16 carries, 97 yards
- NCSU - Jordan Houston – 8 carries, 62 yards

Top Receiving

- NC - Dyami Brown – 6 receptions, 150 yards, TD
- NCSU - Tabari Hines – 7 receptions, 89 yards, TD

== Players drafted into the NFL ==
Round	Pick	Player	Position	NFL club
5	174	Larrell Murchison	DT	Tennessee Titans
7	229	James Smith-Williams	DE	Washington Redskins
