= 2019 Military Bowl =

Postseason college football bowl game

2019 Military Bowl presented by Northrop Grumman
- 12th Military Bowl
| North Carolina Tar Heels | Temple Owls |
| (6–6) | (8–4) |
| ACC | The American |
| 55 | 13 |
| Head coach: Mack Brown | Head coach: Rod Carey |
| | 1 | 2 | 3 | 4 | Total |
|---|---|---|---|---|---|
| North Carolina | 7 | 13 | 21 | 14 | 55 |
| Temple | 0 | 6 | 7 | 0 | 13 |
- Date: December 27, 2019
- Season: 2019
- Stadium: Navy–Marine Corps Memorial Stadium
- Location: Annapolis, Maryland
- MVP: Sam Howell (QB, North Carolina)
- Favorite: North Carolina by 6
- Referee: Mike VanderVelde (Mountain West)
- Attendance: 24,242
- Payout: US$2,066,990

United States TV coverage
- Network: ESPN & ESPN Radio
- Announcers: ESPN: Mike Couzens (play-by-play), Kirk Morrison (analyst) and Kelsey Riggs (sideline); ESPN Radio: Kevin Winter (play-by-play), Ben Hartsock & Brad Edwards (analysts)

The 2019 Military Bowl was a college football bowl game that was played on December 27, 2019, with kickoff at 12:00 p.m. EST on ESPN. It was the 12th edition of the Military Bowl, and was one of the 2019–20 bowl games concluding the 2019 FBS football season. Sponsored by defense contractor Northrop Grumman, the game was officially known as the Military Bowl presented by Northrop Grumman.

== Teams ==
The game was played between the North Carolina Tar Heels from the Atlantic Coast Conference (ACC) and the Temple Owls from the American Athletic Conference (The American). It was the first time that North Carolina and Temple have played against each other.

=== North Carolina Tar Heels ===
North Carolina entered the game with a 6–6 record (4–4 in conference). The Tar Heels finished in a three-way tie for third place in the ACC's Coastal Division. North Carolina won its first two games, lost six of the next eight, then finished the regular season with two wins.

=== Temple Owls ===
Temple entered the game with an 8–4 record (5–3 in conference). The Owls finished in third place in the East Division of The American. Temple played four ranked teams during the 2019 season, recording wins against Maryland and Memphis while losing to SMU and Cincinnati.

== Game summary ==
2019 Military Bowl presented by Northrop Grumman

| Quarter | 1 | 2 | 3 | 4 | Total |
|---|---|---|---|---|---|
| North Carolina | 7 | 13 | 21 | 14 | 55 |
| Temple | 0 | 6 | 7 | 0 | 13 |

at Navy–Marine Corps Memorial Stadium • Annapolis, Maryland

- Date: Friday, December 27, 2019
- Game time: 12:00 p.m. EST
- Game weather: Overcast • Temperature: 44 °F (7 °C) • Wind: SE 5 mph
- Game attendance: 24,242
- Referee: Mike VanderVelde
- TV announcers (ESPN): Mike Couzens (play-by-play), Kirk Morrison (analyst) and Kelsey Riggs (sideline)
- ESPN game summary

Game information

First Quarter

- (6:24) UNC – Sam Howell 39 yard pass to Dyami Brown, Noah Ruggles kick (Drive: 2 plays, 63 yards, 0:27; North Carolina 7–0)

Second Quarter

- (10:17) UNC – Noah Ruggles 26 yard field goal (Drive: 16 plays, 66 yards, 5:41; North Carolina 10–0)
- (7:59) TEM – Re'Mahn Davis 4 yard rush, kick blocked (Drive: 5 plays, 75 yards, 2:18; North Carolina 10–6)
- (4:14) UNC – Sam Howell 16 yard pass to Dazz Newsome, Noah Ruggles kick (Drive: 8 plays, 75 yards, 3:45; North Carolina 17–6)
- (0:00) UNC – Noah Ruggles 36 yard field goal (Drive: 4 plays, 44 yards, 0:28; North Carolina 20–6)

Third Quarter

- (11:24) UNC – Antonio Williams 1 yard rush, Noah Ruggles kick (Drive: 10 plays, 83 yards, 3:36; North Carolina 27–6)
- (11:12) UNC – Storm Duck 20 yard interception return, Noah Ruggles kick (North Carolina 34–6)
- (6:54) UNC – Rontavius Groves 2 yard pass to Sam Howell, Noah Ruggles kick (Drive: 7 plays, 31 yards, 2:57; North Carolina 41–6)
- (3:21) TEM – Todd Centeio 45 yard pass to Re'Mahn Davis, Jacob LaFree kick (Drive: 4 plays, 51 yards, 1:52; North Carolina 41–13)

Fourth Quarter

- (13:51) UNC – Sam Howell 29 yard pass to Dazz Newsome, Noah Ruggles kick (Drive: 9 plays, 88 yards, 4:30; North Carolina 48–13)
- (2:11) UNC – Antonio Williams 2 yard rush, Noah Ruggles kick (Drive: 12 plays, 52 yards, 7:43; North Carolina 55–13)

=== Statistics ===
| Statistics | UNC | TEM |
|---|---|---|
| First downs | 33 | 16 |
| Plays–yards | 75–534 | 66–272 |
| Rushes–yards | 40–238 | 34–78 |
| Passing yards | 296 | 194 |
| Passing: comp–att–int | 26–35–0 | 18–32–2 |
| Turnovers | | |
| Time of possession | 32:30 | 27:30 |

| Team | Category | Player | Statistics |
|---|---|---|---|
| North Carolina | Passing | Sam Howell | 25/34, 294 yards, 3 TD |
| North Carolina | Rushing | Javonte Williams | 14 carries, 85 yards |
| North Carolina | Receiving | Dyami Brown | 5 receptions, 87 yards, 1 TD |
| Temple | Passing | Anthony Russo | 12/20, 128 yards, 1 INT |
| Temple | Rushing | Re'Mahn Davis | 15 carries, 36 yards, 1 TD |
| Temple | Receiving | Jadan Blue | 8 receptions, 92 yards |
