= Mack Brown =

American football coach (born 1951)

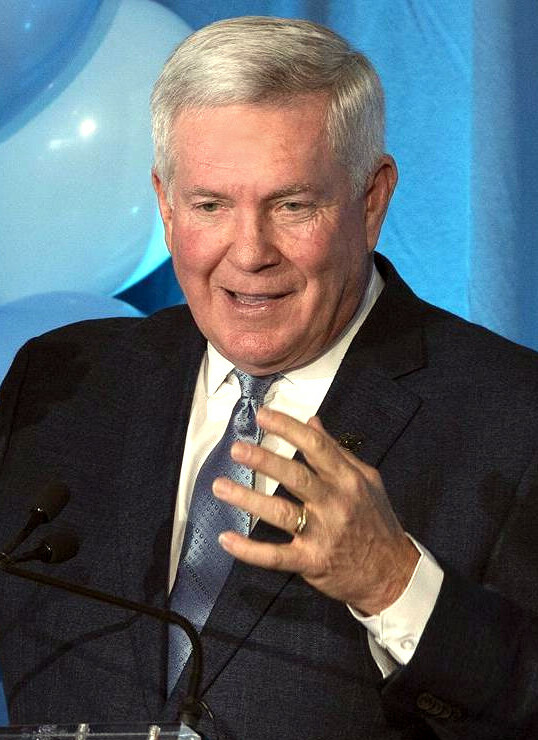
- Brown at UNC in 2019

Biographical details
- Born: August 27, 1951 (age 75); Cookeville, Tennessee, U.S.

Playing career
- 1969–1970: Vanderbilt
- 1972–1973: Florida State
- Position: Running back

Coaching career (HC unless noted)
- 1973–1974: Florida State (student/WR)
- 1975–1977: Southern Miss (WR)
- 1978: Memphis State (WR)
- 1979: Iowa State (WR)
- 1980–1981: Iowa State (OC)
- 1982: LSU (OC/QB)
- 1983: Appalachian State
- 1984: Oklahoma (OC)
- 1985–1987: Tulane
- 1988–1997: North Carolina
- 1998–2013: Texas
- 2019–2024: North Carolina

Administrative career (AD unless noted)
- 1985–1988: Tulane

Head coaching record
- Overall: 288–155–1
- Bowls: 14–12

Accomplishments and honors

Championships
- 1 BCS national champion (2005); 2 Big 12 (2005, 2009); 6 Big 12 South Division (1999, 2001–2002, 2005, 2008–2009); 1 ACC Coastal Division (2022)

Awards
- ACC Coach of the Year (1996); Paul "Bear" Bryant Award (2005); Bobby Dodd Coach of the Year Award (2008); 2× Big 12 Coach of the Year (2005, 2009)
- College Football Hall of Fame; Inducted in 2018 (profile)

William Mack Brown (born August 27, 1951) is an American former college football coach. Brown most recently coached at the University of North Carolina, where he had two stints, first from 1988 until 1997, and again from 2019 until his firing at the end of the 2024 season. During his second stint in Chapel Hill, Brown became the North Carolina Tar Heels football program's all-time winningest coach, passing Dick Crum for most wins in program history.

Brown is perhaps most well known for his tenure at the University of Texas at Austin, where he coached the Texas Longhorns from 1998 until 2013, winning two Big 12 Conference championships, and a national championship in 2005. His 2005 Texas Longhorns football team won the 2006 Rose Bowl, in what has been considered the greatest game in college football history, to win the national title.

Prior to his head coach positions at Texas and North Carolina, Brown was head football coach at Appalachian State University for one season, in 1983, and at Tulane University from 1985 to 1987. While at Tulane, he also served as the school's athletic director. He is credited with revitalizing the North Carolina and Texas football programs.

In 2006, he was awarded the Paul "Bear" Bryant Award for "Coach of the Year". Brown achieved his 200th career win during the 2008 season, making him the first Texas coach to reach that mark. He resigned after the 2013 Alamo Bowl, leaving as the second-winningest coach in program history (11 wins behind Darrell Royal).

== Early life ==
Brown was born as the middle of three boys (brothers Mel and Watson) on August 27, 1951, in Cookeville, Tennessee. He was born into a Church of Christ family. During his teenage years, he attended Putnam County High School. Brown's family had a long history with football. His grandfather, Eddie Watson, was an athlete at Tennessee Tech and a coach at Putnam County High School for more than three decades. His father, Melvin Brown, was also a coach and an administrator. Mack's older brother Watson also coached, and was the head football coach at a total of six Division I football schools, ending his career with their hometown school, Tennessee Tech. Mack attended Vanderbilt University before attending Florida State University and graduating in 1974. He later received a graduate degree from the University of Southern Mississippi in 1976. During his undergraduate years, Brown was a member of Sigma Alpha Epsilon fraternity.

== Playing career ==
Brown was a three-sport star at Putnam County High School, playing football, basketball and baseball. After his senior season, he won All-State as well as Prep All-America honors and was selected one of the nation's top running backs by Scholastic Magazine his senior year. The Tennessean selected him as the state player of the year.

He accepted a football scholarship to Vanderbilt University, where his brother Watson Brown was the starting quarterback. In his time playing for the Vanderbilt Commodores, he played for Bill Pace and rushed 82 times for 364 yards and three touchdowns, as well as catching seven passes for 50 yards and a touchdown during the 1970 season.

Brown then transferred to Florida State University. Brown played for Florida State under head coach Larry Jones. At Florida State, he had 31 rushing attempts for 98 yards and 10 catches for 76 yards with no touchdowns in the 1972 season. Lettering twice as a running back for the Seminoles, he started his coaching career as a student coach after five knee surgeries ended his career prematurely.

While at Florida State, Brown was roommates with Dick Hopkins.

== Coaching career ==
=== Early positions ===
Brown's first experience coaching came as a student coach of wide receivers at Florida State, a position he held in 1973 and 1974. From 1975 to 1977, he was the wide receivers coach at Southern Miss. This was followed by a one-year stint as wide receivers coach at Memphis State.

For the 1979 season, he joined the staff of Iowa State, again as a wide receivers coach, before a promotion to offensive coordinator. In 1980, after going 3–8 the year prior, Iowa State improved their record to 6–5 in large part due to running back Dwayne Crutchfield (1,312 yards with 11 TDs) and the rest of Brown's offense. The team scored 108 more points that year than they had in 1979. In 1981, the team finished with a 5–5–1 record, despite starting out with a record of 5–1–1. RB Dwayne Crutchfield was again a key focal point in Brown's offense and ran for 1,189 yards with 17 TDs.

In 1982, Brown moved to LSU as the quarterbacks coach. The LSU Tigers improved their record to 8–3–1 from 3–7–1 the year prior in large part due to Brown's coaching of quarterback Alan Risher, who threw for 1,834 yards with 17 TD and 8 INT. He also completed 63.7% of his pass attempts. Risher had thrown 14 TD in the previous two seasons combined before Brown's arrival.

=== Appalachian State ===
Brown's first head coaching job came in 1983 when he led Appalachian State to a 6–5 record. In December 1983, he was seriously considered for the head coaching position at LSU which had been vacated after Jerry Stovall was fired, but the position instead went to Miami Dolphins defensive coordinator Bill Arnsparger.

=== Oklahoma ===
Brown moved back to a role as offensive coordinator for the Oklahoma Sooners during the 1984 season under head coach Barry Switzer. Oklahoma would run for 2,376 yards as a team that season, averaging 216 yards a game. QB Danny Bradley also would throw for nearly 1,000 yards with 8 TD vs 5 INT. RBs Lydell Carr, Steve Sewell, and Spencer Tillman combined to run for 1,651 yards with 12 TD.

=== Tulane ===
Brown's second head coaching position came with Tulane in 1985, where he also became the school's athletic director in the wake of a point shaving scandal which led to the shutdown of the men's basketball program. Despite a slow start (a 1–10 record in his first year), he made gradual improvement, leading the Green Wave to a 4–7 record in 1986 and, in 1987, to a 6–6 record and a trip to the Independence Bowl, Tulane's fifth bowl game in over 40 years and last until 1998.

=== North Carolina (first stint) ===
In 1988, Brown was named the head coach at North Carolina. Brown's first two teams finished with identical 1–10 records, the worst two seasons that the Tar Heels have suffered on the field in modern times. However, the next two years saw a relatively quick return to respectability. In 1990, the Tar Heels finished 6–4–1. By comparison, the Tar Heels had won only seven games in the previous three years. Included in the 1990 total was a tie of Georgia Tech that proved to be the Yellow Jackets' only non-win that season en route to a share of the national championship. In 1991, the Tar Heels finished 7–4, narrowly missing a bowl bid.

Everything finally came together for the Tar Heels in 1992. They finished 8–3 in the regular season and second in the Atlantic Coast Conference, and with a victory over Mississippi State in the Peach Bowl, they finished the season at 9–3. The Peach Bowl was the program's first bowl appearance since 1986 and their first bowl win since 1982. They also notched their first appearance in a final Top 25 poll since 1982.

The 1992 season was the start of UNC's most successful period since the Charlie Justice era in the late 1940s. Brown coached the Tar Heels to five consecutive bowl games, including UNC's only two New Year's Day bowl games in more than half a century (or three, if one counts the 1992–93 Peach Bowl, which was played the day after New Year's to avoid a conflict with the Sugar Bowl). They were ranked in the AP Top 25 every week from October 1992 through the start of the 1995 season. They finished in the final rankings in four out of five years, including two straight appearances in the top 10. They also won 10 regular-season games in 1993 and 1997, only the second and third times the Tar Heels have accomplished this. Largely due to Florida State joining the league in 1992, Brown was unable to win an ACC title—something the Tar Heels haven't done since 1980.

Brown's time at UNC also saw renewed popularity for a team that had long played in the shadow of the school's powerhouse basketball team. Games at Kenan Memorial Stadium were almost always sold out, the highlight being a standing-room only crowd of 62,000 that watched the Tar Heels play Florida State in 1997, still the largest crowd to watch a college football game on campus in the state of North Carolina. Brown also spearheaded a major renovation to Kenan Stadium that featured upgraded team facilities and an expansion to 60,000 seats.

Brown was offered the head coaching position at Oklahoma in 1995. He turned the job down and it instead went to Howard Schnellenberger.

Not long after the end of the 1997 season, Brown accepted the head coaching job at Texas. His defensive coordinator, Carl Torbush, coached the Tar Heels in that year's Gator Bowl. North Carolina credits the 1997 regular season to Brown and the Gator Bowl to Torbush.

=== Texas ===
In his early years at UT, Brown was referred to as "Coach February," due to his success in bringing in high talent recruits. His detractors felt that with all the resources at his disposal at Texas, combined with the talent he was recruiting from high school programs, that he should have more to show for it than appearances in the Holiday Bowl or Cotton Bowl Classic. They felt that he should be playing for Big 12 titles or even National Championships instead.

In five of the first seven seasons under Brown, the Longhorns were all but eliminated from either of these two goals due to losses in October to Big 12 rival Oklahoma. Since the two teams played in the same division of the Big 12, a loss by Texas to Oklahoma meant that Texas could not win the south division of the conference unless Oklahoma lost at least two conference games. However, in 1999 Brown led Texas to their second Big 12 title game where they were beaten by a higher ranked Nebraska team that they had beaten earlier in the year. In 2001, Brown took Texas to their 3rd Big 12 title game. In that year's campaign, the Longhorns lost to the Sooners, but were given another chance when the Sooners lost to both Nebraska and Oklahoma State. Texas lost the Big 12 Championship Game to Colorado, a school they had beaten by a substantial margin earlier in the year. Many felt that Texas would have played in the BCS Championship game had they beaten Colorado. A similar opportunity presented itself in 2002. After Oklahoma beat Texas, they lost to Texas A&M and Oklahoma State. However, Texas suffered a loss to Texas Tech, so they did not make the championship game.

In 2003, Texas finished the regular season with a 10–2 regular season record, and most observers felt they had the resume to reach their first BCS bowl under Brown. However, when South Champion (and No. 1 ranked) Oklahoma lost to North Champion Kansas State in the Big 12 championship game, Kansas State received the Big 12 Conference's automatic BCS bid as conference champion and joined Oklahoma in the BCS. The BCS rules specified that no more than two teams from a single conference could receive bids. Texas was frozen out.

Although Brown consistently led the Longhorns to a bowl game to cap off each season in his first six years, he was not able to lead them to a Bowl Championship Series game, having to settle each year for the Holiday Bowl or Cotton Bowl Classic. His record in these games was 3–3, with two of the three losses coming at the hands of supposedly inferior teams as judged by the rankings headed into the games.

==== 2004 season ====
In 2004, the Longhorns began the season with a No. 7 ranking nationally and had risen to No. 5 coming into the annual matchup with then No. 2 Oklahoma in the Red River Shootout. Oklahoma shutout the Longhorns 12–0. Texas dropped to No. 9, before rebounding with wins over No. 24 Missouri, 28–20, at No. 24 Texas Tech, 51–21, and at Colorado, 31–7. Then Texas set a record for the largest come from-behind-win in school history, beating No. 19 Oklahoma State, 56–35, after falling behind 35–7. After this performance, Texas again fell behind against Kansas, but squeaked out a win 27–23. Kansas head coach Mark Mangino stirred up controversy by claiming that the officials were biased in favor of Texas because the conference wanted a second team in a BCS bowl game and Texas was in position to gain an at-large BCS bid. The series of victories brought Texas back up to No. 5 in the rankings as they welcomed arch-rival Texas A&M to Austin and won 26–13. However, Oklahoma stood undefeated, which meant the Sooners would represent the Big 12 South in the championship game against a much lower ranked team from the North Division. Once again, the loss to Oklahoma had kept Texas out of playing for a national or conference title, and had seemingly destined them to a non-BCS bowl as well.

With Texas and California both vying for a spot in the Rose Bowl, Brown received criticism for lobbying on behalf of his team, which many perceived was a factor in UT's Rose Bowl invitation. Cal was denied what would have been their first Rose Bowl bid since 1958. "I thought it was a little classless how Coach Brown was begging for votes," Cal quarterback Aaron Rodgers told reporters in Berkeley. "I think a team's record and the way you play should speak for itself." Cal's only loss was a 23–17 nailbiter on the road at USC. Cal dominated the game statistically, more than doubling USC in total yardage. The Golden Bears had a first-and-goal from the 9-yard-line with roughly one minute left in the fourth quarter, but could not convert. Meanwhile, Texas's lone loss was a 12–0 defeat to Oklahoma on a neutral field. USC and Oklahoma, the teams Cal and Texas lost to, respectively, went on to play in the national championship. USC blew out Oklahoma 55–19 in that game. However, Texas fans point to the Holiday Bowl, where Cal was dealt a 45–31 loss at the hands of No. 23 Texas Tech, a team which Texas defeated 51–21 earlier in the season.

Brown's Longhorns accepted the bid to play in the Rose Bowl. It was the first visit by the Longhorns, due mainly to the fact that the Rose Bowl traditionally pitted the winner of the Pac-10 against the winner of the Big Ten. Texas's opponent was Michigan, whom Texas was playing for the first time. Texas won the game, 38–37, on a last second field goal by kicker Dusty Mangum in what had been called one of the greatest Rose Bowl games of all time. Despite the success of the 2004 season, Coach Brown's resume was still lacking both a conference championship and a national championship.

==== 2005 season ====
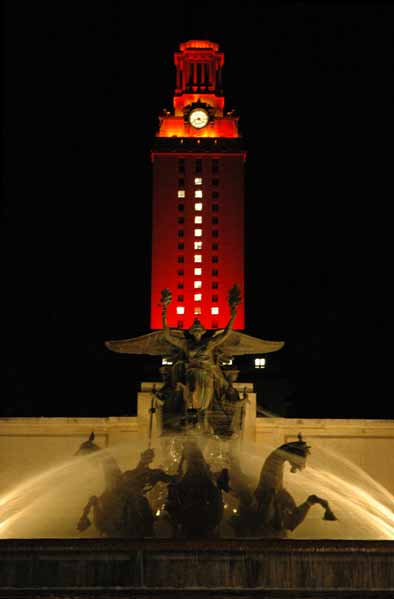
The UT Tower lit in a special configuration in honor of the 2005 National Championship football team

Texas opened the season ranked No. 2 behind USC in every preseason poll. Led by quarterback Vince Young, Texas defeated their early opponents easily, including a decisive 45–12 victory over Oklahoma. That marked the 6th time the Longhorns entered the contest ranked 2nd nationally, and they have won all six times. With the win, Texas started the season 5–0 for the first time since 1983. That season was the last time UT had national title hopes, when they ended the regular season 11–0 before losing to Georgia in the Cotton Bowl Classic.

After a win over previously undefeated Texas Tech, Texas moved into first place in the Bowl Championship Series (BCS) standings for the first time since its creation. However, the following week Texas fell back down to No. 2 in the BCS poll, while USC moved back into the #1 spot. Both teams won all their remaining games, with USC and Texas remaining ranked No. 1 and #2 throughout the rest of the regular season.

The two teams finally met in the BCS National Championship Game at the 2006 Rose Bowl in a highly anticipated matchup. Texas and USC were the only two unbeaten NCAA Division I-A (now FBS) teams, and the game marked the first time two teams averaging over 50 points per game had met. The combined 53-game win streak was an NCAA record for teams playing each other and the game was also the first to have teams ranked first and second in every iteration of the BCS standings. The game also featured USC's two Heisman winners (Reggie Bush, Matt Leinart) as well as a Heisman finalist in Vince Young. In an up and down game, Texas eventually defeated USC 41–38, highlighted by a 4th and 5 touchdown run and 2 point conversion by Vince Young in the final minute, giving the Longhorns their first national championship in 34 years.

==== 2006 season ====
After defeating USC the year before in the BCS Championship game to finish with the undisputed No. 1 ranking, Texas began the 2006 season ranked No. 2 in the optimistic pre-season polls, having replaced the NFL-departed quarterback Vince Young with freshman Colt McCoy. The Longhorns however lost convincingly to No. 1 ranked Ohio State in the second game of the season in Austin. The Horns quickly rebounded to win seven straight games (including a second straight win over nemesis Oklahoma in the Red River Shootout) to climb into the Big 12 South driver's seat and entertain thoughts of a rematch with Ohio State in the national championship, but in the season's 10th game McCoy was injured and Texas was shocked on the road at Kansas State. After the loss, the Horns returned home still needing a final win to clinch the Big 12 South, and even though McCoy returned for the annual matchup Texas was again shocked, losing, 12–7, to intrastate rival Texas A&M. The loss snapped UT's six-game winning streak over the Aggies and the horns settled for the Alamo Bowl where Texas defeated a 6–6 Iowa team in a close game to cap off a 10 win season.

==== 2007 season ====
Mack Brown entered his 10th season as the head coach of the Texas Longhorns with a record of 93–22 setting a new mark above 0.8 winning percentage (.809), the best in Longhorn history. The 2007 Texas Longhorns football team began play ranked third in the all-time list of both total wins and winning percentage, and were ranked in the Top 10 by numerous pre-season polls.

Despite expectations, prior to and during the season a total of seven UT players were suspended for various infractions. Brown said “I am extremely disappointed that four of our student-athletes have had issues with the law this summer. That is not reflective of the high standard of class, character and integrity we have established at Texas for many years. It’s a shame that these recent events have generated a great deal of negative attention, because I do think that overall, this is as good of a group of kids that I’ve ever coached. I think that will show over time.” The negative publicity was more extensive than in past instances but Mack Brown publicly supported the players while denouncing their actions.

For the second straight year, UT merchandise were the top-selling products among buyers of Collegiate Licensing Company. UT used part of the money to give Mack Brown a raise: the University of Texas Board of Regents voted unanimously to raise Brown's salary by $300,000, bringing his annual compensation to $2.81 million and keeping him among the five highest paid coaches in the sport. The package also contained provisions for up to $3 million in bonuses, including "$100,000 if he wins the Big 12 Championship and $450,000 if he wins this year's national championship, as well as bonuses based on the percent of players who graduate." Brown's contract was extended through the 2016 season and includes buy-out clauses should another school attempt to hire Brown.

For the football season, Texas won their first four games although three of them were closer than analysts had expected. In their next game Texas was beaten for a second year in a row by the Kansas State Wildcats 41–21 through play with no turnovers and 21 combined points from defense and special teams. The Kansas State Wildcats scored one touchdown on a punt return, one on a kick return, and one on an interception; Previously, Texas had never allowed all three types of scores in a single season. The 41 points were the most scored against Texas in Austin since UCLA handed the Longhorns a 66–3 loss in 1997, and it was the worst home defeat in the Mack Brown era at Texas. Texas lost again the following week in the 2007 Red River Shootout, 28–21. With that loss, Texas opened conference play 0–2 for the first time since 1956, when they were in the Southwest Conference and one year before Darrell Royal became head coach of the Longhorns. But that was as bad as it got for Mack Brown during the first decade of the 21st century. In their ninth regular season game, Texas outscored Nebraska 28–25, marking Brown's 100th win at Texas. In their next two games, the Longhorns would defeat Oklahoma State and Texas Tech, but in their final matchup against archrival Texas A&M, the Longhorns lost 30–38. This marked the Longhorns' second straight loss to the Aggies. Despite the loss, Texas went to the Holiday Bowl to defeat 11th-ranked Arizona State 52–34. The Longhorns finished the season 10–3, marking their seventh consecutive 10-win season, the third longest of all time in FBS history, trailing Florida State's 14 from 1987 to 2000 and Miami's 8 from 1985 to 1992.

==== 2008 season ====
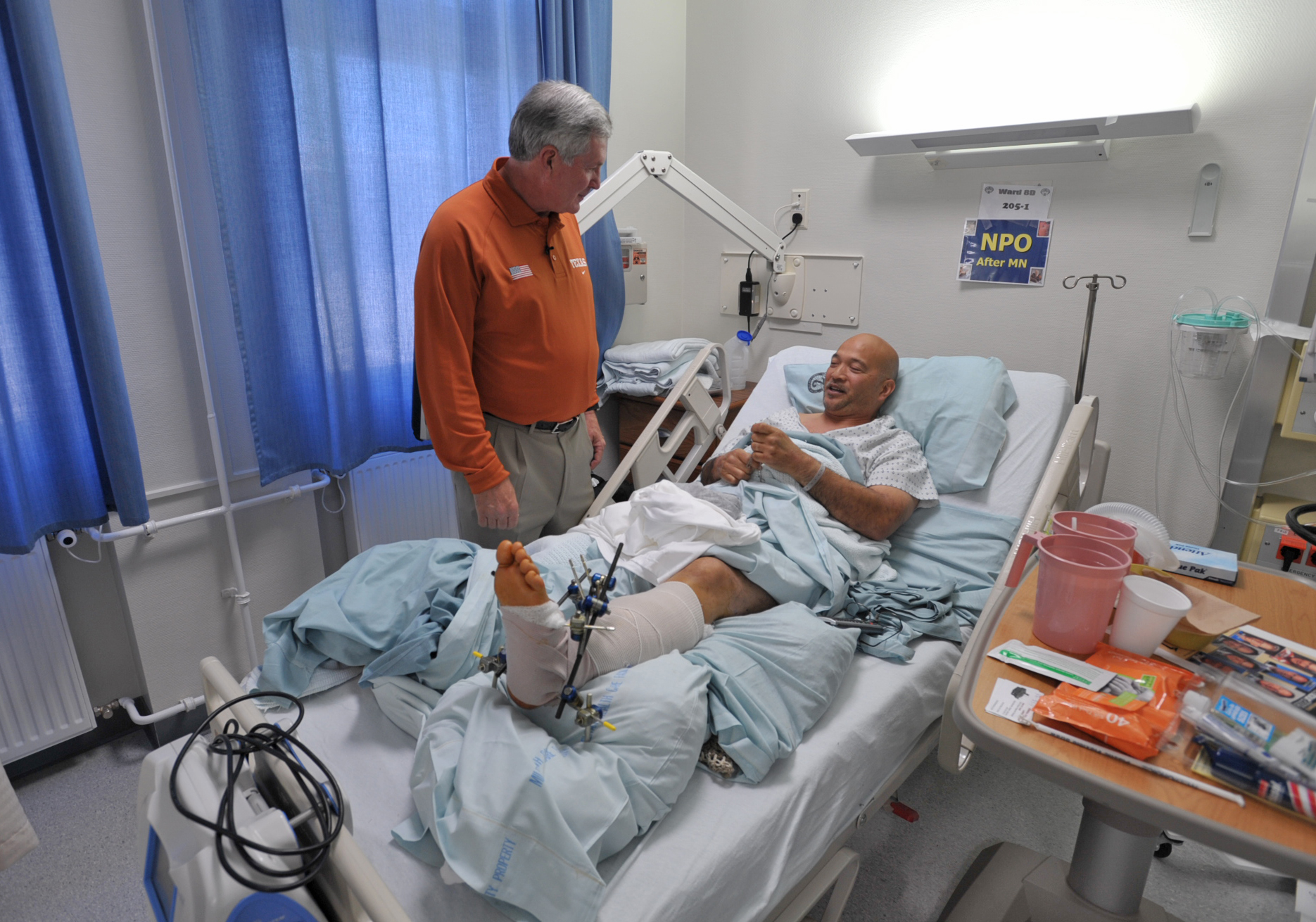
Mack Brown visiting a US military hospital in Germany

The 2008 Texas Longhorns football team entered the season ranked 10th in the USA Today Coaches Poll. They won their first four games to rise to number 5 in the national rankings. Texas began Big 12 Conference play on October 4, 2008, with a trip to Boulder, Colorado and a win over the Colorado Buffaloes. On October 11, 2008, they defeated the number-one ranked Oklahoma Sooners in the 103rd Red River Shootout. It was the third UT win in four seasons, and the first time in Brown's tenure for either team to upset the other in the Red River Shootout.

Following the victory over OU, the Longhorns vaulted up the standings to first place in the AP, ESPN/USA Today, and Harris Polls. In their next game they secured a win over No. 11 Missouri in Austin, setting a new school, state, and conference attendance record in the process. It was the first time since 1977 for the Longhorns to play a home football game as the No. 1 team in the AP. Texas's reign at the top of the BCS standings was soon brought to an end; however, by the then seventh-ranked Red Raiders of Texas Tech. In a game played before a record-setting national television audience on November 1, 2008, the Longhorns, who trailed the entire game, took the lead with one minute and twenty-eight seconds remaining on the clock. Texas Tech then scored a comeback touchdown with one second remaining to win the game 39–33, keeping Texas out of the Big 12 Championship Game and national title pictures. Texas finished the 2008 regular season with a win over Texas A&M, the Longhorns' longest-running rivalry opponent. The biggest margin of victory in the history of the series occurred when Texas beat A&M 48–0 in 1898. Texas nearly equaled that record in 2008 by producing a 49–9 victory, the second-largest margin of victory for this rivalry series. It was also the 200th career win for Mack Brown, and it set a new attendance record for UT, the State of Texas, the Big 12 Conference, and the southwest region. Texas would go on to win the 2009 Fiesta Bowl by beating Ohio State, 24–21.

==== Final years at Texas ====
In 2009, Texas went undefeated in the regular season to win the Big 12 South Division. They defeated Nebraska in the Big 12 Championship Game to earn a berth in the national title game against Alabama. QB Colt McCoy was injured early in the game and did not return, leaving the offense in the hands of inexperienced true freshman Garrett Gilbert. Alabama defeated Texas to win the national title. Brown would coach the Longhorns for four more seasons. However, the teams would not match the success of the previous years. In 2010, the team had a losing record and did not play in a bowl game for the first and only time under Brown. On December 14, 2013, he announced his resignation as Texas's Head Coach effective following that season's bowl game.

=== North Carolina (second stint) ===
On November 27, 2018, Brown was named head coach at North Carolina after a 5-year absence from coaching and 21 years after he left UNC for Texas. In his first game coaching in 6 years and first game as North Carolina's coach in 22 years, the Tar Heels upset the South Carolina Gamecocks in Charlotte 24–20. Coincidentally his first game as North Carolina's coach in 1988 came against South Carolina. In the home opener a week later, the Tar Heels defeated the Miami Hurricanes on a last-minute touchdown. Two weeks later, they nearly upset No. 1 ranked and defending national champion Clemson, but what would have been the go-ahead two-point conversion failed. It proved to be the only close game Clemson had in the regular season.

The following week, Brown's Tar Heels defeated Georgia Tech 38–22. It was Brown's 72nd win with the Tar Heels, tying Dick Crum as the winningest coach in school history. He broke the record two weeks later with a 20–17 victory over Duke. On November 30, UNC defeated NC State 41–10 to become bowl eligible for the first time since 2016. They then routed Temple 55–13 in the Military Bowl.

Brown's second tenure as Tar Heel coach has seen a significant uptick in recruiting. Shortly after returning to Chapel Hill, Brown convinced Sam Howell, a highly touted high school quarterback from Indian Trail, North Carolina (a suburb of Charlotte) to de-commit from Florida State. Chazz Surratt, one of the team's quarterbacks for the previous two seasons under Larry Fedora, switched to the defensive side of the ball and became an all-ACC linebacker. Despite losing six games in his first season back, Brown's influence was evident by the team's performances on the field.

In 2020, Brown led the Tar Heels to a tie for third place in the ACC (divisional play had been suspended due to the COVID-19 pandemic). With both Clemson and Notre Dame selected for the College Football Playoff, the Tar Heels received a berth in the Orange Bowl as the highest-ranked remaining ACC team. It was the Tar Heels' first major-bowl appearance since after the 1949 season. Brown's Tar Heels lost 41–27 to No. 5 Texas A&M, but held the lead early in the fourth quarter.

Entering the 2021 season, Brown's Tar Heels were ranked 9th in the preseason AP Poll and were picked by the media to win the ACC Coastal Division. Junior quarterback Sam Howell was poised to be one of the favorites for the Heisman Trophy and was picked as the preseason ACC Player of the Year. The Tar Heels entered the season with the highest expectations in over a decade.

However, a week one loss to unranked Virginia Tech and subsequent losses to Georgia Tech and Florida State derailed the season. Despite falling short of expectations, Brown was able to guide the Tar Heels to bowl eligibility for the third straight season, thanks in part to a dramatic comeback win over a top ten Wake Forest team in Kenan Stadium. It was only the third time the Tar Heels have ever defeated a team ranked in the top 10 of a major media poll. Despite losing the Duke's Mayo Bowl to South Carolina and finishing the season with a losing record for the first time since his return, Brown signed the second consecutive top-15 recruiting class of his second stint as the Tar Heel head coach.

==== 2022 ====
Going into the 2022 season, Brown's Tar Heels were plagued with a number of question marks on both sides of the ball. Defensive coordinator Jay Bateman was let go, following the worst defensive performance of Bateman's tenure in Chapel Hill the previous season. Hired to replace him was Gene Chizik, who had previously been on Brown's staff at Texas before winning a National Championship at Auburn in 2010 as a head coach. Chizik's last coaching job prior to taking a five-year hiatus was under previous Tar Heel coach Fedora as the Heels' DC in 2015 and 2016. There was also a position battle throughout the offseason to decide who would take over the starting quarterback job for Sam Howell, who had left for the NFL. Drake Maye would emerge in training camp as the man for the job, being named the starter officially the week before the Tar Heels season-opener. Maye would go on to challenge for, and break, several of the Tar Heels' single season QB records in his first full season under center.

Brown led the 2022 Tar Heels to a 9–1 record after ten games, clinching the final ACC Coastal Division Championship by beating Wake Forest. After defeating the Demon Deacons, Brown's Tar Heels would fail to win another game, finishing the season 9–5 after losing the final two regular season games, the ACC championship to Clemson, and the Holiday Bowl to Oregon.

==== 2023 ====
Prior to the 2023 season, more staff changes were made. Offensive coordinator Phil Longo and offensive line coach Jack Bicknell Jr. left for the same positions at Wisconsin. They were replaced by Chip Lindsey and Randy Clements, respectively. Tight ends coach John Lilly left the staff as well, joining the Carolina Panthers under their new head coach, Frank Reich. Lilly would be replaced by former Cleveland Browns head coach Freddie Kitchens. Finally, Tar Heel legend and cornerbacks coach Dre Bly was also let go, being replaced by Indiana defensive backs coach Jason Jones.

After the season opening win against the South Carolina Gamecocks, Brown became the first coach in North Carolina's history to achieve 100 wins at the school, and in so doing became the first FBS coach with 100 wins at two different programs.

With a defense that had seemingly improved over their 2022 performance, Maye's continued excellence, and the emergence of running back Omarion Hampton as a true lead tailback in Lindsey's revamped offense, the 2023 Tar Heels finished the first half of the season 6–0, their best start since Brown's final year before leaving for Texas in 1997. Tez Walker's return after his NCAA eligibility crisis and tight end Bryson Nesbit's best season in Chapel Hill also boosted the Tar Heel offense, with both players projected to be NFL draft picks. However, much like the season before, the Tar Heels again stumbled to the finish, going 2–5 in the final seven games. They finished the season 8–5, capped by a loss to West Virginia in the Duke's Mayo Bowl. Backup quarterback Conner Harrell started the game against the Mountaineers after Maye opted out to prepare for the 2024 NFL draft, in which he was picked third overall by the New England Patriots.

==== 2024 ====
Heading into the 2024 season, Brown and the Tar Heels aimed to chart a different course than the previous two seasons. Along with other coaching and staff changes, Chizik was let go as defensive coordinator, and Brown hired former Temple and Georgia Tech head coach Geoff Collins as new defensive coordinator. Seeking to replace Maye, who departed for the NFL, Brown also brought in transfer quarterbacks Max Johnson and Jacolby Criswell, to compete with 2023 backup quarterback Harrell for the starting job. Johnson initially won the position, and started the opener against Minnesota, but broke his leg early in the second half and was ruled out for the remainder of the season. Harrell started the next two games, and despite both being Tar Heel wins, Harrell had limited success in both, and was benched ultimately in favor of Criswell who started the final nine games of the regular season. After starting the season 3–0, the Tar Heels lost four games in a row, including a 70–50 loss to James Madison (which was the most points scored by a Tar Heel opponent both at home and in school history) and the Victory Bell to rivals Duke for the first time since 2018. The James Madison loss was particularly controversial, as an emotional exchange took place in the Tar Heel locker room following the game. Brown, it appeared, told the team he was quitting, only to immediately walk back the comments the following week in his press conference.

The James Madison locker room incident and four-game losing streak proved to be inflection points in the season, as despite the Tar Heels showing some improved week-over-week performances following their 3–4 start to the season, Brown's team only won three more games in the regular season, barely clinching bowl eligibility by finishing the regular season 6–6, including another close loss to rivals NC State. One highlight of the season, however, was when the Tar Heels defeated Florida State, 35–11, in Tallahassee, resulting in Brown defeating FSU for the first time in his head coaching career, dating back to his first stint as Carolina's head coach and his tenure at Tulane.

During the 2024 season, speculation surrounded Brown's coaching future, with the James Madison game and postgame comments cited as key reasons for uncertainty surrounding Brown's future as Tar Heel coach. Much like his tenure in Texas, his second stint in Chapel Hill ended acrimoniously. Prior to the team's final game against NC State, Brown publicly expressed plans to return for 2025 at his weekly press conference, seemingly putting an end to the speculation. The next day however, athletic director Bubba Cunningham fired Brown. Leading up to his comments in the press conference before the NC State game, Cunningham and Brown had been working towards a mutual ending to the coach's tenure at Carolina, but Brown's comments forced the administration to react and terminate his contract.

The Tar Heels lost Brown's final game, the regular season finale against NC State, 35–30, which included a fight between the teams at midfield after the game had ended. Tar Heel Tight Ends Coach and Run Game Coordinator Freddie Kitchens was named interim head coach for the team's appearance in the Fenway Bowl on December 28. The Tar Heels lost to UConn 27–14, finishing the year at 6–7.

==== Traditions ====
Upon returning to Chapel Hill, Brown started a tradition of lighting the Morehead-Patterson Bell Tower Carolina blue after every win. He carried this tradition over from his time at Texas; for many years the Texas Tower has been lit burnt orange after Longhorn wins.

== Notable statistics and accomplishments ==
- 2005 NCAA Football National Championship (game played in January 2006)
- 2005 NCAA Football Coach of the Year
- 20 consecutive winning seasons
- 18 consecutive bowl game appearances
- 162 consecutive weeks ranked in the AP poll from 2000 to 2010 and 192 consecutive weeks ranked in the coach's poll from 1998 to 2010.
- Big 12 Conference record 21 consecutive conference wins from 2004 to 2006.
- Player awards at Texas under Brown include a Heisman Trophy winner (Ricky Williams), three Maxwell Award winners (Ricky Williams, Vince Young, Colt McCoy), two Davey O'Brien Award Winners (Vince Young, Colt McCoy), two Doak Walker Award winners (Ricky Williams, Cedric Benson), a Butkus Award winner, two Thorpe Award winners and four national player of the year honors. Texas has also had 23 All-Americans, 37 first-team All-Big 12 selections, three Big 12 Offensive Players of the Year, two Big 12 Conference Defensive Players of the Year and seven Big 12 Freshman of the Year honorees.
- UT posted back-to-back 11-win seasons, nine consecutive 10-win seasons and ten consecutive 9-win campaigns for the first time in school history. However, Texas played a maximum of only 11 games per season up until 1975 and only 12 games per season up until 1995 (including conference championship and bowl game).
- The Longhorns under Brown featured the only 3,000-yard passer, the only 2,000-yard rusher, the only 1,000-yard receivers and the only 1,000-yard passer/rusher in UT history (again, note the longer seasons in recent decades).
- Brown is one of only three head coaches in FBS history to coach players who recorded a 2,000-yard rushing season, a 1,000-yard receiving season and a 3,000-yard passing season. Also, Vince Young stands as the first player in NCAA history to rush for 1,000 yards (1,050) and throw for 3,000 yards (3,036) in a single season.
- Under Brown's tenure, only five players have left the Texas team for the NFL draft with any eligibility remaining. The first was Kwame Cavil who went undrafted. Vince Young was drafted third overall in the 2006 NFL draft. Jamaal Charles and Jermichael Finley both announced they would enter the 2008 NFL draft and were both drafted in the 3rd round (73rd and 91st overall, respectively). Earl Thomas left Texas after the 2009 season and was drafted in the 1st round of the 2010 NFL draft. Other players, such as Jevan Snead have elected to transfer to other schools.
- From 2001 through 2009, Brown won 10 or more games each year.
- The Longhorns under Brown were 32–17 against their four archrivals: Texas A&M, Oklahoma, Arkansas and Texas Tech.
- The Longhorns were 10–5 in Bowl games under Brown.
- With Bobby Bowden's retirement after the 2009 season, Brown became first among all active coaches with 20 consecutive winning seasons.(until his losing season in 2010–2011 5–7)
- Mack Brown won the 2008 Bobby Dodd Coach of the Year award from the Bobby Dodd Foundation.
- In 2012, he was elected third vice president of the American Football Coaches Association which places him in line per AFCA tradition to move up one level each year until becoming president in 2015.
- When combined with his brother Watson Brown, they compose the pair of brothers with the most combined wins, and the most combined losses, in NCAA Division I football history.
- Brown was inducted into the Tennessee Sports Hall of Fame in 2015.
- First coach to win 100 games with two different programs.

== Outside of football ==
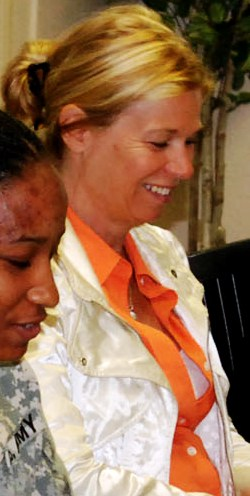
Brown's wife, Sally, in April 2009

Mack Brown's wife is named Sally. They have four children: Matt Jessee, Katherine Brown, Barbara Wilson, and Chris Jessee.

In Austin, Mack and Sally continue to be active in community affairs, serving as honorary co-chairpersons of the Capital Campaign for the Helping Hands of Austin. They have also been instrumental in the opening of The Rise School of Austin (an early childhood education program that integrates children who have disabilities with their typically developing peers) and serve on the school's board of directors. They lent their name along with legendary Texas quarterback James Street to the First Annual James Street/Mack Brown Golf Tournament benefiting The Rise School. The Browns have endorsed a new Texas license plate, which is designed to raise public awareness for child abuse and neglect, and the need for Court Appointed Special Advocates (CASA) volunteers. After the Aggie Bonfire tragedy at Texas A&M in 1999, the couple initiated a blood drive on the Texas campus that attracted more than 250 blood donors. Austin Mayor Lee Leffingwell pronounced January 30, 2014, "Mack and Sally Brown Day" in honor of the many contributions the Browns had made to the city of Austin during Mack's time as head coach of the Longhorns.

In October 2006, Mack Brown made a cameo appearance in the television pilot for Friday Night Lights. Early in the show, a resident is heard to say "Who does [Coach Taylor] think he is? Mack Brown? He's no Mack Brown." Later in the pilot, the real Mack Brown plays the role of a local football booster quizzing high school coach Eric Taylor on his pre-game preparation. As Longhorn coach, Brown also appeared in commercials for College GameDay where he sang "Texas Fight" with the GameDay crew.

== Head coaching record ==
Year	Team	Overall	Conference	Standing	Bowl/playoffs	Coaches^{#}	AP^{°}
Appalachian State Mountaineers (Southern Conference) (1983)
1983	Appalachian State	6–5	4–3	4th			
Appalachian State:		6–5	4–3				
Tulane Green Wave (NCAA Division I-A independent) (1985–1987)
1985	Tulane	1–10					
1986	Tulane	4–7					
1987	Tulane	6–6			L Independence		
Tulane:		11–23					
North Carolina Tar Heels (Atlantic Coast Conference) (1988–1997)
1988	North Carolina	1–10	1–6	7th			
1989	North Carolina	1–10	0–7	8th			
1990	North Carolina	6–4–1	3–3–1	5th			
1991	North Carolina	7–4	3–4	5th			
1992	North Carolina	9–3	5–3	3rd	W Peach	18	19
1993	North Carolina	10–3	6–2	2nd	L Gator^{†}	21	19
1994	North Carolina	8–4	5–3	T–3rd	L Sun^{†}	21	
1995	North Carolina	7–5	4–4	T–5th	W Carquest		
1996	North Carolina	10–2	6–2	T–2nd	W Gator	10	10
1997	North Carolina	10–1	7–1	2nd	Gator (Note: Brown left for Texas shortly after the end of the 1997 regular season. Carl Torbush coached the Tar Heels in the 1998 Gator Bowl. North Carolina credits the regular season to Brown and the Gator Bowl to Torbush.)	6	4
Texas Longhorns (Big 12 Conference) (1998–2013)
1998	Texas	9–3	6–2	2nd (South)	W Cotton	16	15
1999	Texas	9–5	6–2	1st (South)	L Cotton	23	21
2000	Texas	9–3	7–1	2nd (South)	L Holiday	12	12
2001	Texas	11–2	7–1	1st (South)	W Holiday	5	5
2002	Texas	11–2	6–2	T–1st (South) (Note: Due to tiebreakers, Texas did not compete in the Big 12 Championship game.)	W Cotton	7	6
2003	Texas	10–3	7–1	2nd (South)	L Holiday	11	12
2004	Texas	11–1	7–1	2nd (South)	W Rose^{†}	4	5
2005	Texas	13–0	8–0	1st (South)	W Rose^{†}	1	1
2006	Texas	10–3	6–2	2nd (South)	W Alamo	13	13
2007	Texas	10–3	5–3	2nd (South)	W Holiday	10	10
2008	Texas	12–1	7–1	T–1st (South)^	W Fiesta^{†}	3	4
2009	Texas	13–1	8–0	1st (South)	L BCS NCG^{†}	2	2
2010	Texas	5–7	2–6	6th (South)			
2011	Texas	8–5	4–5	T–6th	W Holiday		
2012	Texas	9–4	5–4	T–3rd	W Alamo	18	19
2013	Texas	8–5	7–2	T–2nd	L Alamo		
Texas:		158–48	98–33				
North Carolina Tar Heels (Atlantic Coast Conference) (2019–2024)
2019	North Carolina	7–6	4–4	T–3rd (Coastal)	W Military		
2020	North Carolina	8–4	7–3	T–3rd	L Orange^{†}	17	18
2021	North Carolina	6–7	3–5	5th (Coastal)	L Duke's Mayo		
2022	North Carolina	9–5	6–2	1st (Coastal)	L Holiday		
2023	North Carolina	8–5	4–4	T–5th	L Duke's Mayo		
2024	North Carolina	6–6	3–5	T–10th	(Note: Fired prior to end of season and did not coach the bowl game.)		
North Carolina:		113–79–1	67–58–1				
Total:		288–155–1					
National championship Conference title Conference division title or championship game berth
^{†}Indicates Bowl Coalition, Bowl Alliance, BCS or CFP / New Years' Six bowl.; ^{#}Rankings from final Coaches Poll.; ^{°}Rankings from final AP Poll.

== See also ==
- List of college football career coaching wins leaders
