= Sam Howell =

American football player (born 2000)

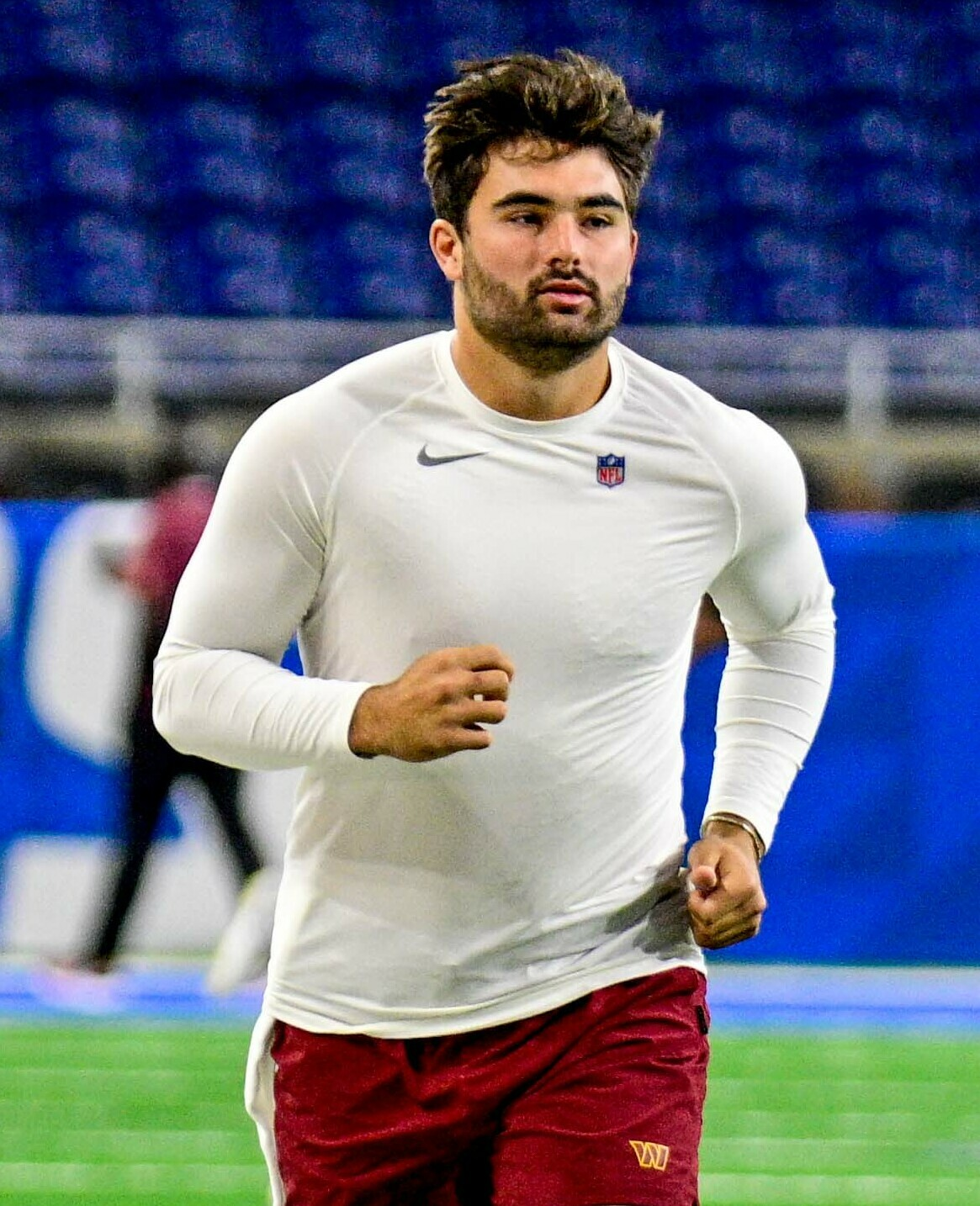
- Howell with the Washington Commanders in 2022

No. 16 – Dallas Cowboys
- Position: Quarterback
- Roster status: Active

Personal information
- Born: September 16, 2000 (age 26); Waynesville, North Carolina, U.S.
- Listed height: 6 ft 1 in (1.85 m)
- Listed weight: 225 lb (102 kg)

Career information
- High school: Sun Valley; (Monroe, North Carolina)
- College: North Carolina (2019–2021)
- NFL draft: 2022: 5th round, 144th overall pick

Career history
- Washington Commanders (2022–2023); Seattle Seahawks (2024); Minnesota Vikings (2025)*; Philadelphia Eagles (2025); Dallas Cowboys (2026–present)
- * Offseason or practice squad member only

Awards and highlights
- ACC Rookie of the Year (2019); Second-team All-ACC (2020); Third-team All-ACC (2019)

Career NFL statistics as of 2026
- Passing attempts: 645
- Passing completions: 404
- Completion percentage: 62.6%
- TD–INT: 22–23
- Passing yards: 4,139
- Passer rating: 77.5
- Stats at Pro Football Reference

Samuel Duke Howell (born September 16, 2000) is an American professional football quarterback for the Dallas Cowboys of the National Football League (NFL). He played college football for the North Carolina Tar Heels, setting school records for most touchdown passes in a single season (38) as well as career passing yards (10,283) and touchdown passes (92).

Howell was selected by the Washington Commanders in the fifth round of the 2022 NFL draft, starting the final game of the season. In 2023, he threw for over 3,900 yards while leading the league in passing attempts, interceptions and sacks. Howell was traded to the Seattle Seahawks in 2024, and then to the Minnesota Vikings in April 2025 before being traded to the Philadelphia Eagles in August 2025. He signed with the Cowboys in the following offseason.

== Early life ==
Howell was born on September 16, 2000, in Waynesville, North Carolina, and grew up in Union County, North Carolina. He attended and played football for Sun Valley High School, where he threw for 13,415 yards and 145 touchdowns while rushing for 3,621 yards and 60 touchdowns.

The second-ranked recruit in North Carolina, Howell originally committed to play college football at Florida State University (FSU) but flipped to the University of North Carolina (UNC) after FSU offensive coordinator Walt Bell left the program to pursue other coaching opportunities and Mack Brown was hired as UNC's head coach.

== College career ==
=== Freshman ===
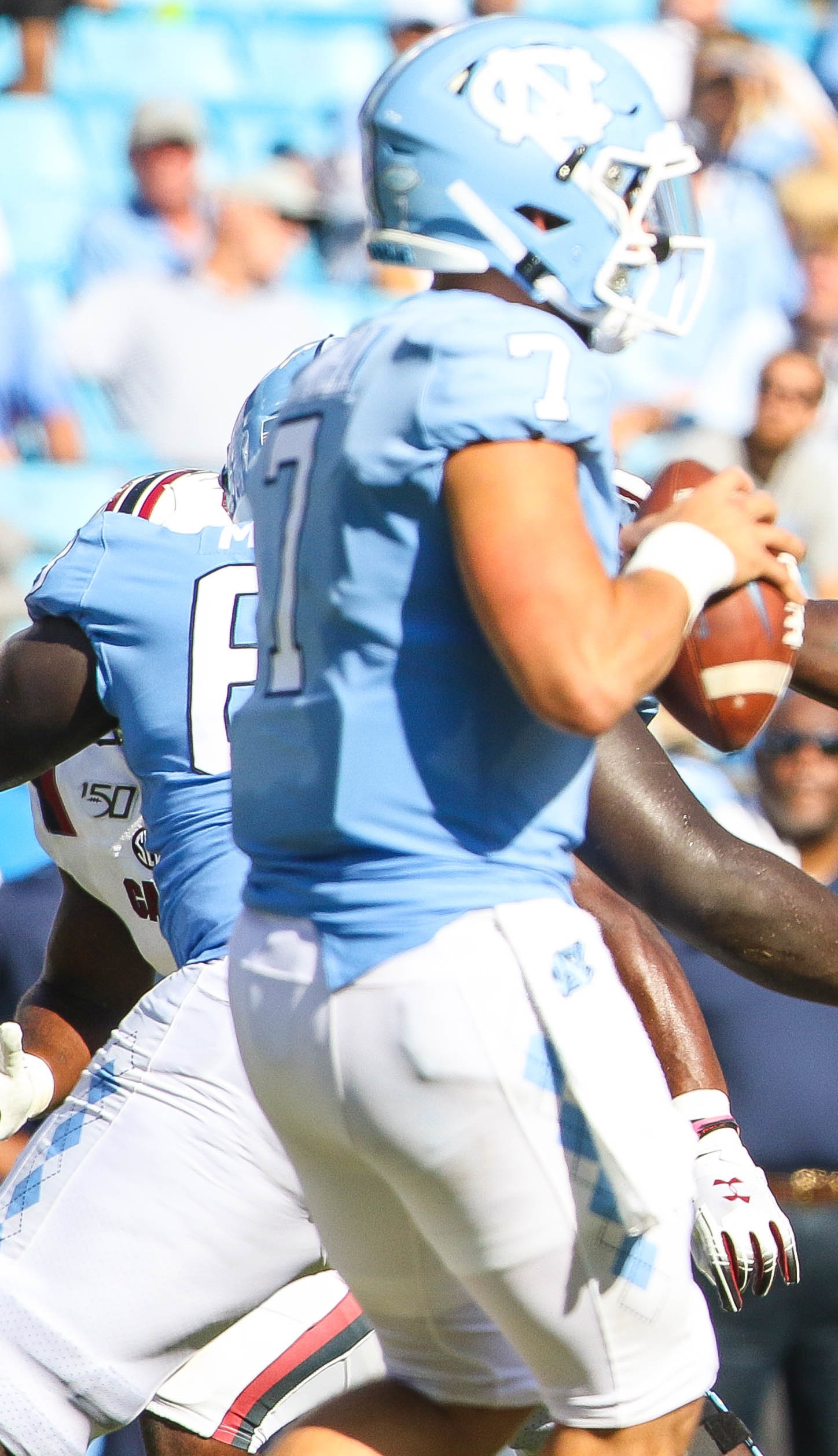
Howell with North Carolina in 2019

Howell enrolled at the University of North Carolina at Chapel Hill in January 2019. He became the first true freshman to win the starting quarterback job for the Tar Heels. In his debut, he passed for 245 yards and two touchdowns in a season-opening 24–20 victory over South Carolina. Against NC State, Howell threw for 401 yards and three touchdowns in a 41–10 victory.

Howell was named the ACC Rookie of the Year after completing 259 of 422 passes for 3,641 yards with 38 touchdowns, a freshman FBS record. His yardage and touchdown totals were also the highest in the conference on the year, earning third-team All-ACC honors in addition. Howell was also named the 2019 Military Bowl MVP after throwing for three touchdowns with a touchdown catch in a 55–13 win over Temple.

=== Sophomore ===
Howell was included on watchlists for the Maxwell, Manning, and O'Brien awards prior to his sophomore season. He earned ACC Player of the Week honors after throwing for 443 yards against Virginia. Against Wake Forest two weeks later, Howell threw for 550 yards and 6 touchdowns, both school records, while rushing for another touchdown. Howell would record his second career touchdown catch in a 62–26 victory over the Miami Hurricanes. He would finish the season throwing three touchdowns in the 2021 Orange Bowl in a 41–27 loss to Texas A&M and would earn second-team All-ACC honors in the process. 2020 would be Howell's most successful season as Tar Heel starting quarterback, leading the team to an 8–4 record and a final ranking of 18 in the AP Poll.

=== Junior ===
Much like his sophomore year, Howell received significant hype going into his junior campaign, being named to multiple award watchlists, and was also considered one of the top quarterbacks in the nation. Against Georgia State in week two, Howell threw for 352 yards and three touchdowns and rushed for 104 yards and two more scores, becoming the second quarterback in Tar Heel history to throw for over 300 passing yards and 100 rushing yards in the same game. The following week against Virginia, Howell threw for 307 yards and five touchdowns while also rushing for 112 yards, joining Lamar Jackson as the second Power 5 quarterback to post back-to-back games of over 300 passing and 100 rushing yards since 2004.

On the last play of overtime against Pittsburgh, he suffered an injury to his non-throwing shoulder which caused him to miss the following game against Wofford. He made his return the following week in a 34–30 loss to NC State, throwing for 147 yards, one touchdown, and an interception alongside two rushing touchdowns. He finished the season throwing for 3,056 with 24 touchdowns while rushing for 828 yards with 11 touchdowns. He graduated in December 2021 and announced that he would forgo his remaining college eligibility to enter the 2022 NFL draft. Howell would finish his Tar Heel career throwing for 92 touchdown passes and 10,283 yards, both school records. He threw at least one touchdown pass in every game he played in college.

== Professional career ==
Pre-draft measurables
Height	Weight	Arm length	Hand span	Wingspan
6 ft 0 5/8 in (1.84 m)	218 lb (99 kg)	30 3/4 in (0.78 m)	9 1/8 in (0.23 m)	6 ft 3 1/2 in (1.92 m)
All values from NFL Combine

=== Washington Commanders ===
Despite common predictions of being an early pick in the 2022 NFL draft, Howell was selected in the fifth round (144th overall) by the Washington Commanders. He signed his four-year rookie contract on May 6, 2022.

Howell made his first career start and played in his first career game in Week 18 of the 2022 season after the team had been eliminated from playoff contention. He completed 11-of-19 passes for 169 yards and recorded a passing and rushing touchdown in a 26–6 win over the Dallas Cowboys. He would remain the starting quarterback for the 2023 season, beating out Jacoby Brissett in training camp. In Week 3, Howell threw four interceptions and was sacked nine times in a 37–3 loss to the Buffalo Bills. By mid-November, he led the NFL in passing yards with over 2,700 while on pace to break the single-season sack record by a quarterback, taking 40 in the first seven games.

In Week 15 against the Los Angeles Rams, Howell was benched in favor of Brissett in the fourth quarter after only managing to accrue 11 completions out of 26 pass attempts, one touchdown, and one interception. Howell started the following week against the New York Jets, but would be benched in the third quarter after recording 56 yards on 6 pass completions and two interceptions. He was benched for the Week 17 game for Brissett. However, Brissett injured his hamstring during practice, thrusting Howell back into the starting role. Howell finished the regular season starting all 17 games with 3,946 passing yards and 21 touchdowns. His 612 passing attempts, 21 interceptions and 65 sacks, were all league highs during the 2023 regular season.

=== Seattle Seahawks ===
On March 14, 2024, Howell was traded to the Seattle Seahawks along with a fourth-round pick (No. 102 overall) and a sixth-round pick (No. 179) in the 2024 NFL draft in exchange for a 2024 third-rounder (No. 78) and a 2024 fifth-rounder (No. 152). Howell served as the backup to Geno Smith throughout the season, appearing in only two games. Most of his playing time came during a Week 15 loss to the Green Bay Packers, when he replaced an injured Smith and completed five of 14 passes for 24 yards with one interception.

=== Minnesota Vikings ===
In the 2025 offseason, the Seahawks signed Sam Darnold and Drew Lock in free agency and drafted Alabama Quarterback Jalen Milroe rendering Howell expendable. On April 26, 2025, the Minnesota Vikings traded a fifth-round pick (No. 142 overall) for Howell and fifth-round pick (No. 172 overall) in the 2025 NFL draft.

=== Philadelphia Eagles ===
On August 24, 2025, the Philadelphia Eagles traded a 2026 fifth-round pick and a 2027 seventh-round pick in exchange for Howell and a 2026 sixth-round pick from the Minnesota Vikings.

=== Dallas Cowboys ===
On March 10, 2026, Howell signed a one-year, $2.5 million contract with the Dallas Cowboys.

== Career statistics ==
=== NFL ===
Legend
Led the league

NFL statistics
Year	Team	Games			Passing									Rushing					Sacks		Fumbles	
Year	Team	GP	GS	Record	Cmp	Att	Pct	Yds	Y/A	Lng	TD	Int	Rtg	Att	Yds	Y/A	Lng	TD	Sck	Yds	Fum	Lost
2022	WAS	1	1	1–0	11	19	57.9	169	8.9	52	1	1	83.0	5	35	7.0	10	1	3	11	0	0
2023	WAS	17	17	4–13	388	612	63.4	3,946	6.4	51	21	21	78.9	48	263	5.5	24	5	65	449	4	2
2024	SEA	2	0	—	5	14	35.7	24	1.7	12	0	1	14.6	1	2	2.0	2	0	4	21	0	0
2025	PHI	0	0	—	DNP																	
Career		20	18	5–13	404	645	62.6	4,139	6.4	52	22	23	77.5	54	300	5.6	24	6	72	481	4	2

=== College ===
College statistics
Season	Team	Games		Passing								Rushing				Receiving			
Season	Team	GP	GS	Cmp	Att	Pct	Yds	Y/A	TD	Int	Rtg	Att	Yds	Avg	TD	Rec	Yds	Avg	TD
2019	North Carolina	13	13	259	422	61.4	3,641	8.6	38	7	160.2	94	35	0.4	1	3	23	7.7	1
2020	North Carolina	12	12	237	348	68.1	3,586	10.3	30	7	179.1	92	146	1.6	5	1	1	1.0	1
2021	North Carolina	12	12	217	347	62.5	3,056	8.8	24	9	154.2	183	828	4.5	11	0	0	0.0	0
Career		37	37	713	1,117	63.8	10,283	9.2	92	23	164.2	369	1,009	2.8	17	4	24	6.0	2

== Personal life ==
Howell is part Korean; his American grandfather met his Korean grandmother while stationed in Korea in 1960 after the Korean War. He has never eaten any beef or seafood, with chicken being the only meat in his diet. Howell is also good friends with former teammate Drake Maye, who succeeded him as the starting quarterback at UNC.
