= 2019 North Carolina Tar Heels football team =

American college football season

2019 North Carolina Tar Heels football

Military Bowl champion

Military Bowl, W 55–13 vs. Temple
- Conference: Atlantic Coast Conference
- Coastal Division
- Record: 7–6 (4–4 ACC)
- Head coach: Mack Brown (11th season)
- Offensive coordinator: Phil Longo (1st season)
- Offensive scheme: Air raid
- Co-defensive coordinators: Jay Bateman (1st season); Tommy Thigpen (1st season)
- Base defense: 4–2–5
- Captains: British Brooks; Myles Dorn; Charlie Heck; Sam Howell; Jason Strowbridge
- Home stadium: Kenan Stadium

Uniform
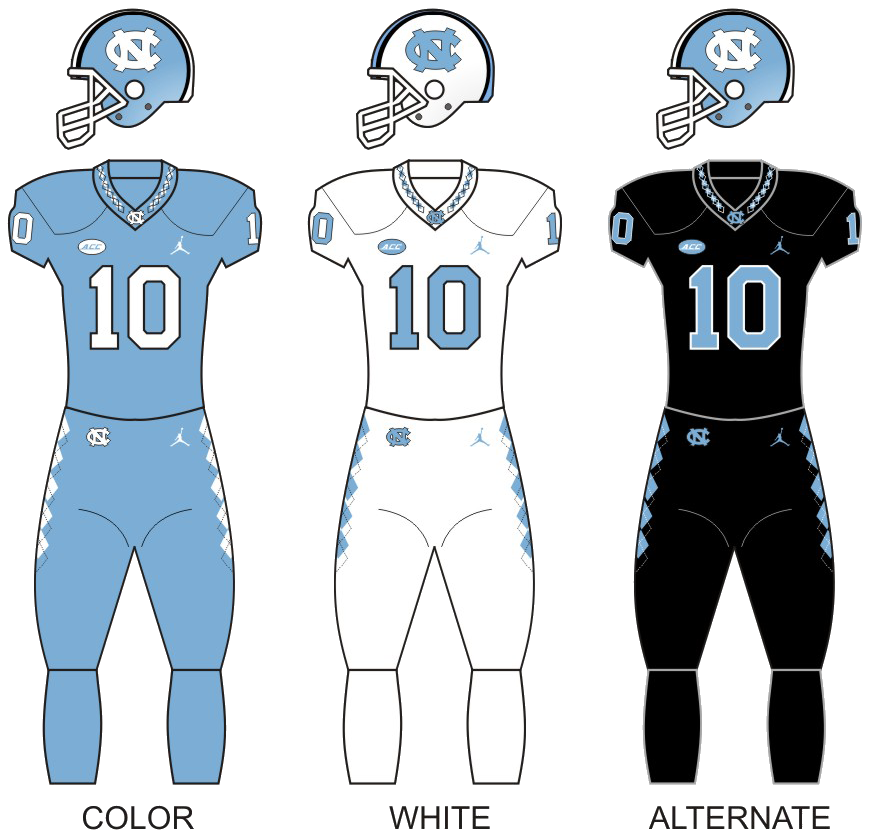

2019 Atlantic Coast Conference football standings
	Conf.			Overall
Team	W		L	W		L
Atlantic Division
No. 2 Clemson xy$^	8	–	0	14	–	1
Louisville	5	–	3	8	–	5
Wake Forest	4	–	4	8	–	5
Boston College	4	–	4	6	–	7
Florida State	4	–	4	6	–	7
Syracuse	2	–	6	5	–	7
NC State	1	–	7	4	–	8
Coastal Division
Virginia x	6	–	2	9	–	5
Virginia Tech	5	–	3	8	–	5
Pittsburgh	4	–	4	8	–	5
North Carolina	4	–	4	7	–	6
Miami (FL)	4	–	4	6	–	7
Duke	3	–	5	5	–	7
Georgia Tech	2	–	6	3	–	9
Championship: Clemson 62, Virginia 17
^ – College Football Playoff participant; $ – Conference champion; x – Division champion/co-champions; Rankings from AP Poll

The 2019 North Carolina Tar Heels football team represented the University of North Carolina at Chapel Hill as a member of Coastal Division of the Atlantic Coast Conference (ACC) during the 2019 NCAA Division I FBS football season. Led by head coach Mack Brown, in the first season of his second stint at North Carolina and his 11th overall season, the team played their home games at Kenan Stadium. The Tar Heels finished the season 7–6 overall and 4–4 in ACC play to tied for third place in the Coastal Division. They were invited to the Military Bowl, where they defeated Temple.

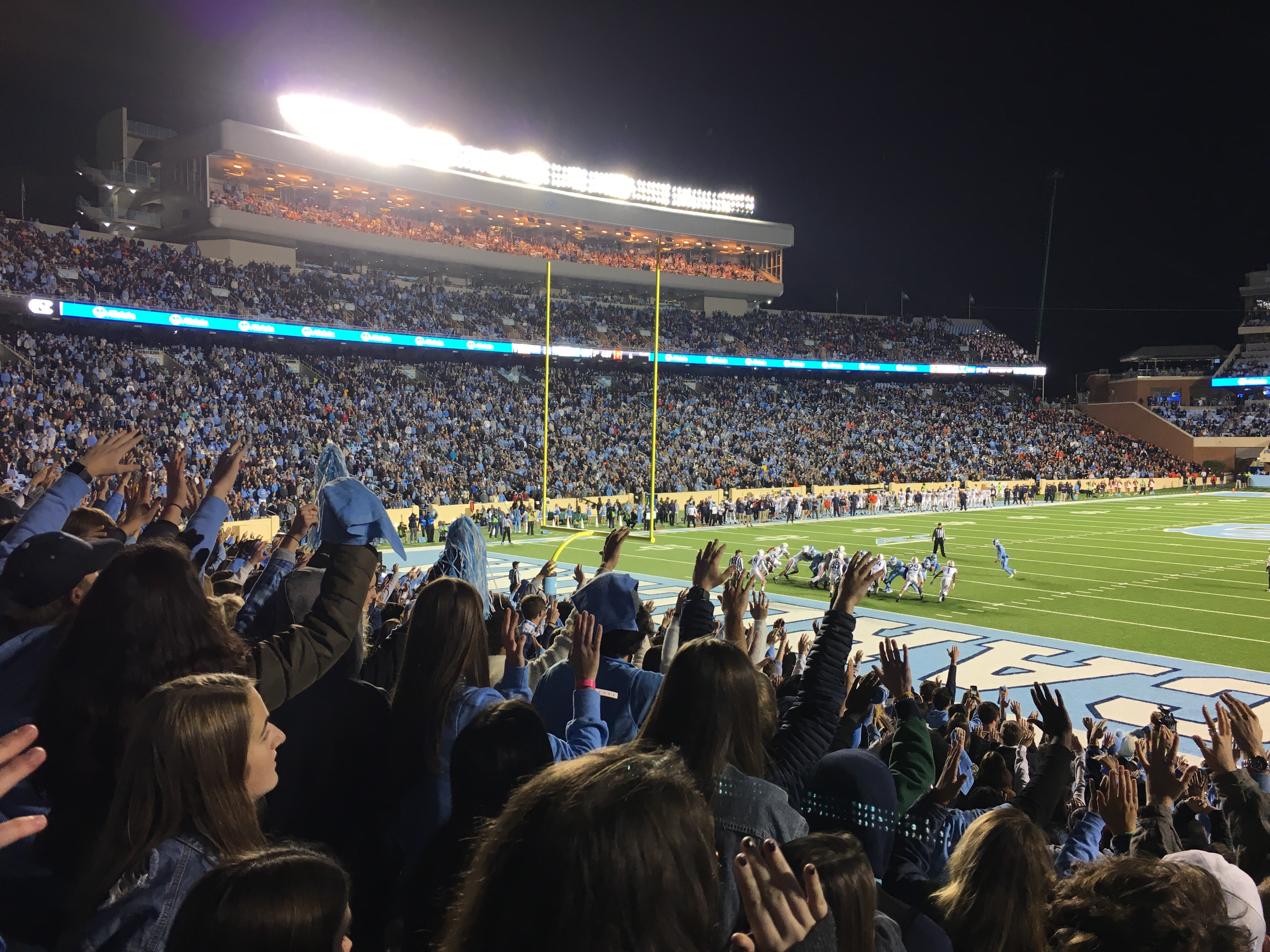
North Carolina students cheering versus the Virginia Cavaliers

== Preseason ==
=== Preseason media poll ===
In the preseason ACC media poll, North Carolina was predicted to finish in sixth in the Coastal Division.

== Personnel ==
=== Coaching staff ===
North Carolina Tar Heels coaches
Mack Brown	Head coach	1st
Phil Longo	Offensive coordinator/quarterbacks coach	1st
Tim Brewster	Associate head coach/tight end coach	1st
Stacy Searels	Offensive line coach	1st
Lonnie Galloway	Wide receivers coach	1st
Robert Gillespie	Running back coach	1st
Jay Bateman	Defensive coordinator/Safeties coach	1st
Tommy Thigpen	Associate Defensive coordinator/Inside linebackers coach	2nd
Tim Cross	Defensive line coach	1st
Scott Boone	Special teams coordinator/Outside linebackers coach	1st
Dre Bly	Cornerbacks coach	1st
Brian Hess	Strength and conditioning	1st
Sparky Woods	Senior advisor to head coach	1st
Darrell Moody	Senior advisor to head coach	1st
Ken Browning	Senior advisor to head coach	1st

=== Roster ===
2019 North Carolina Tar Heels Football Roster
Quarterback: 7 Sam Howell – freshman (6'1, 220); 10 Jace Ruder – (redshirt) freshman (6'3, 225); 12 Donovan Brewington – freshman (5'10, 175); 19 Vincent Amendola – freshman (6'2, 215); Running back: 8 Michael Carter – junior (5'10, 200); 23 Josh Henderson – freshman (6'1, 205); 24 Antonio Williams – senior (5'11, 220); 25 Javonte Williams – sophomore (5'10, 215); 34 British Brooks – sophomore (5'11, 205); Wide receiver: 1 Khafre Brown – freshman (6'0, 180); 2 Dyami Brown – sophomore (6'1, 195); 3 Antoine Green – sophomore (6'2, 205); 4 Rontavious Groves – (redshirt) junior (5'11, 195); 5 Dazz Newsome – junior (5'11, 190); 9 Corey Bell – (redshirt) senior (5'9, 190); 11 Roscoe Johnson – (redshirt) junior (6'0, 195); 14 Emery Simmons – freshman (6'0, 190); 15 Beau Corrales – junior (6'4, 210); 17 Welton Spottsville – freshman (6'0, 200); 83 Justin Olson – freshman (6'2, 185); Placekicker: 90 Michael Rubino – (redshirt) graduate (6'3, 215); 97 Noah Ruggles – (redshirt) sophomore (6'2, 185); Punter: 91 Ben Kiernan – freshman (6'0, 205)	Tight end: 80 Jake Bargas – (redshirt) senior (6'2, 250); 82 Brandon Fritts – (redshirt) graduate (6'3, 250); 84 Garrett Walston – (redshirt) junior (6'4, 245); 86 Carl Tucker – (redshirt) senior (6'2, 248); 87 Noah Turner – (redshirt) junior (6'3, 255); 88 Kamari Morales – freshman (6'3, 237); Offensive lineman: 51 Wyatt Tunall – freshman (6'6, 295); 54 Avery Jones – (redshirt) freshman (6'4, 305); 55 Ty Murray – freshman (6'2, 320); 56 Billy Ross – (redshirt) sophomore (6'5, 315); 58 Nick Polino – (redshirt) graduate (6'3, 305); 63 Ed Montilus – (redshirt) freshman (6'3, 310); 66 Tobechi Nwokeji – (redshirt) sophomore (6'5, 305); 67 Charlie Heck – (redshirt) senior (6'8, 315); 68 Brian Anderson – (redshirt) sophomore (6'2, 302); 71 Triston Miller – freshman (6'6, 290); 72 Asim Richards – freshman (6'5, 285); 73 Marcus McKethan – (redshirt) sophomore (6'7, 330); 74 Jordan Tucker – (redshirt) sophomore (6'7, 335); 75 Joshua Ezeudu – (redshirt) freshman (6'5, 325); 76 William Barnes – (redshirt) freshman (6'4, 315); 78 Layton Barber – (redshirt) freshman (6'5, 325); Defensive lineman: 51 Raymond Vohasek – sophomore (6'3, 280); 52 Jahlil Taylor – (redshirt) freshman (6'0, 300); 55 Jason Strowbridge – (redshirt) senior (6'5, 285); 56 Tomari Fox – freshman (6'3, 275); 58 Lancine Turay – (redshirt) freshman (6'5, 275); 69 Quiron Johnson – (redshirt) sophomore (6'1, 305); 90 Xach Gill – (redshirt) sophomore (6'4, 290); 91 Nolan DeFranco – (redshirt) junior (6'5, 265); 92 Aaron Crawford – (redshirt) senior (6'2, 290); 93 Kristian Varner – freshman (6'4, 275); 94 Wisdom Asaboro – freshman (6'7, 285); 95 Brant Lawless-Sherrill – freshman (6'2, 290); 98 Kevin Hester – freshman (6'5, 270)	Linebacker: 3 Dominique Ross – senior (6'3, 228); 7 Jonathan Smith – senior (6'0, 228); 8 Khadry Jackson – freshman (6'1, 220); 12 Tomon Fox – (redshirt) junior (6'3, 260); 14 Jake Lawler – (redshirt) sophomore (6'4, 245); 17 Chris Collins. – sophomore (6'4, 240); 21 Chazz Surratt – (redshirt) junior (6'3, 230); 24 Eugene Asante – freshman (6'1, 215); 30 Matthew Flint – (redshirt) freshman (6'0, 235); 33 Allen Cater – senior (6'4, 260); 42 Tyrone Hopper – (redshirt) junior (6'4, 255); 43 Hunter Sheridan – (redshirt) junior (6'3 240); 44 Jeremiah Gemmel – (redshirt) sophomore (6'1, 228); 49 Parks Cochrane – freshman (5'11, 225); Defensive back: 1 Myles Dorn – senior (6'2, 205); 2 Bryce Watts – junior (6'0, 170); 4 Trey Morrison – sophomore (5'10, 190); 5 Patrice Rene – senior (6'2, 205); 6 Bryson Richardson – sophomore (6'0, 203); 9 Cam'Ron Kelly – freshman (6'0, 203); 10 Greg Ross – (redshirt) junior (6'0, 188); 11 Myles Wolfolk – (redshirt) junior (5'11, 205); 13 Don Chapman – freshman (6'0, 185); 15 DeAndre Hollins – (redshirt) freshman (6'1, 210); 16 D.J. Ford – (redshirt) junior (6'3, 210); 20 Obi Egbuna – freshman (5'10, 171); 23 Javon Terry – (redshirt) freshman (6'1, 200); 25 Tre' Shaw – (redshirt) sophomore (6'0, 190); 27 Giovanni Biggers – freshman (6'1, 180); 28 Kyler McMichael – sophomore (6'0, 200); 29 Storm Duck – freshman (6'1, 200); Long snappers: 60 Trevor Collins – (redshirt) junior (6'2, 235); 61 Drew Little – freshman (5'11, 225)
: 2019 North Carolina Tar Heels Football Roster 08/27/19

== Schedule ==
Date	Time	Opponent	Site	TV	Result	Attendance
August 31	3:30 p.m.	vs. South Carolina*	Bank of America Stadium; Charlotte, NC (Belk Kickoff Game, rivalry)	ESPN	W 24–20	52,183
September 7	8:00 p.m.	Miami (FL)	Kenan Stadium; Chapel Hill, NC	ACCN	W 28–25	50,500
September 13	6:00 p.m.	at Wake Forest* (Note: Although both North Carolina and Wake Forest are ACC members, this game will not count in the conference standings. The schools scheduled it as a non-conference game because they otherwise only play once every six years due to conference divisional alignment.)	BB&T Field; Winston-Salem, NC (rivalry)	ESPN	L 18–24	31,345
September 21	3:30 p.m.	Appalachian State*	Kenan Stadium; Chapel Hill, NC	ACCRSN	L 31–34	50,500
September 28	3:30 p.m.	No. 1 Clemson	Kenan Stadium; Chapel Hill, NC	ABC	L 20–21	50,500
October 5	4:00 p.m.	at Georgia Tech	Bobby Dodd Stadium; Atlanta, GA	ACCN	W 38–22	45,044
October 19	3:30 p.m.	at Virginia Tech	Lane Stadium; Blacksburg, VA	ACCRSN	L 41–43 ^{6OT}	65,632
October 26	4:00 p.m.	Duke^{†}	Kenan Stadium; Chapel Hill, NC (Victory Bell)	ACCRSN	W 20–17	50,500
November 2	7:30 p.m.	Virginia	Kenan Stadium; Chapel Hill, NC (South's Oldest Rivalry)	ACCN	L 31–38	50,500
November 14	8:00 p.m.	at Pittsburgh	Heinz Field; Pittsburgh, PA	ESPN	L 27–34 ^{OT}	39,290
November 23	3:30 p.m.	Mercer*	Kenan Stadium; Chapel Hill, NC	ACCRSN	W 56–7	50,500
November 30	7:00 p.m.	at NC State	Carter–Finley Stadium; Raleigh, NC (rivalry)	ACCN	W 41–10	56,413
December 27	12:00 p.m.	vs. Temple*	Navy–Marine Corps Memorial Stadium; Annapolis, MD (Military Bowl)	ESPN	W 55–13	24,242
*Non-conference game; ^{†}Homecoming; Rankings from AP Poll and CFP Rankings after November 5 released prior to game; All times are in Eastern time

== Game summaries ==
=== Vs. South Carolina ===
	1	2	3	4	Total
Gamecocks	10	3	7	0	20
Tar Heels	3	3	3	15	24

Statistics	SC	UNC
First downs	15	23
Total yards	270	483
Rushing yards	128	238
Passing yards	142	245
Turnovers	2	1
Time of possession	26:18	33:42

Team	Category	Player	Statistics
South Carolina	Passing	Jake Bentley	16/30, 142 yards, TD, 2 INT
South Carolina	Rushing	Tavien Feaster	13 rushes, 72 yards, TD
South Carolina	Receiving	Shi Smith	5 receptions, 55 yards
North Carolina	Passing	Sam Howell	15/24, 245 yards, 2 TD
North Carolina	Rushing	Javonte Williams	18 rushes, 102 yards
North Carolina	Receiving	Dazz Newsome	4 receptions, 74 yards

=== Miami (FL) ===
	1	2	3	4	Total
Hurricanes	3	10	6	6	25
Tar Heels	17	0	3	8	28

Statistics	MIA	UNC
First downs	27	22
Total yards	488	389
Rushing yards	179	97
Passing yards	309	292
Turnovers	0	0
Time of possession	35:23	24:37

Team	Category	Player	Statistics
Miami	Passing	Jarren Williams	30/39, 309 yards, 2 TD
Miami	Rushing	DeeJay Dallas	14 rushes, 107 yards
Miami	Receiving	Mike Harley Jr.	5 receptions, 79 yards
North Carolina	Passing	Sam Howell	16/24, 274 yards, 2 TD
North Carolina	Rushing	Javonte Williams	10 rushes, 76 yards, TD
North Carolina	Receiving	Dyami Brown	4 receptions, 80 yards, TD

=== At Wake Forest ===
	1	2	3	4	Total
Tar Heels	0	0	3	15	18
Demon Deacons	7	14	0	3	24

Statistics	UNC	WAKE
First downs	14	21
Total yards	333	436
Rushing yards	144	222
Passing yards	189	214
Turnovers	1	1
Time of possession	29:21	30:39

Team	Category	Player	Statistics
North Carolina	Passing	Sam Howell	17/28, 182 yards, 2 TD
North Carolina	Rushing	Michael Carter	13 rushes, 96 yards
North Carolina	Receiving	Dynami Brown	3 receptions, 84 yards, TD
Wake Forest	Passing	Jamie Newman	14/26, 214 yards, TD, INT
Wake Forest	Rushing	Kenneth Walker III	13 rushes, 94 yards
Wake Forest	Receiving	Sage Surratt	9 receptions, 169 yards, TD

=== Appalachian State ===
	1	2	3	4	Total
Mountaineers	13	14	7	0	34
Tar Heels	7	10	7	7	31

Statistics	APP	UNC
First downs	16	29
Total yards	385	469
Rushing yards	161	146
Passing yards	224	323
Turnovers	1	3
Time of possession	29:29	30:31

Team	Category	Player	Statistics
Appalachian State	Passing	Zac Thomas	20/29, 224 yards, INT
Appalachian State	Rushing	Darrynton Evans	19 rushes, 78 yards, 3 TD
Appalachian State	Receiving	Thomas Hennigan	6 receptions, 90 yards
North Carolina	Passing	Sam Howell	27/41, 323 yards, 3 TD, 2 INT
North Carolina	Rushing	Javonte Williams	16 rushes, 94 yards
North Carolina	Receiving	Dazz Newsome	6 receptions, 88 yards, TD

=== No. 1 Clemson ===
	1	2	3	4	Total
No. 1 Tigers	0	14	0	7	21
Tar Heels	7	7	0	6	20

Statistics	CLEM	UNC
First downs	14	14
Total yards	331	290
Rushing yards	125	146
Passing yards	206	144
Turnovers	1	0
Time of possession	28:11	31:49

Team	Category	Player	Statistics
Clemson	Passing	Trevor Lawrence	18/30, 206 yards, TD
Clemson	Rushing	Travis Etienne	14 rushes, 67 yards, TD
Clemson	Receiving	Tee Higgins	6 receptions, 129 yards, TD
North Carolina	Passing	Sam Howell	15/27, 144 yards, 2 TD
North Carolina	Rushing	Michael Carter	16 rushes, 99 yards
North Carolina	Receiving	Dynami Brown	3 receptions, 63 yards, TD

=== At Georgia Tech ===
	1	2	3	4	Total
Tar Heels	3	14	0	21	38
Yellow Jackets	0	0	7	15	22

Statistics	UNC	GT
First downs	34	14
Total yards	587	321
Rushing yards	211	150
Passing yards	376	171
Turnovers	1	2
Time of possession	36:54	23:06

Team	Category	Player	Statistics
North Carolina	Passing	Sam Howell	33/51, 376 yards, 4 TD, INT
North Carolina	Rushing	Javonte Williams	20 rushes, 144 yards, TD
North Carolina	Receiving	Dazz Newsome	8 receptions, 81 yards, TD
Georgia Tech	Passing	James Graham	11/24, 171 yards, 2 TD, 2 INT
Georgia Tech	Rushing	Jordan Mason	8 rushes, 62 yards, TD
Georgia Tech	Receiving	Adonicas Sanders	3 receptions, 67 yards

=== At Virginia Tech ===
	1	2	3	4	OT	2OT	3OT	4OT	5OT	6OT	Total
Tar Heels	10	7	7	7	3	7	0	0	0	0	41
Hokies	7	14	0	10	3	7	0	0	0	2	43

Statistics	UNC	VT
First downs	23	23
Total yards	491	490
Rushing yards	143	254
Passing yards	348	236
Turnovers	0	2
Time of possession	27:08	32:52

Team	Category	Player	Statistics
North Carolina	Passing	Sam Howell	26/49, 348 yards, 5 TD
North Carolina	Rushing	Michael Carter	13 rushes, 91 yards
North Carolina	Receiving	Dazz Newsome	9 receptions, 112 yards, 2 TD
Virginia Tech	Passing	Hendon Hooker	8/12, 127 yards, TD
Virginia Tech	Rushing	Quincy Patterson	21 rushes, 122 yards, TD
Virginia Tech	Receiving	Tré Turner	5 receptions, 106 yards, TD

=== Duke ===
	1	2	3	4	Total
Blue Devils	3	0	14	0	17
Tar Heels	7	0	10	3	20

Statistics	DUKE	UNC
First downs	22	22
Total yards	329	432
Rushing yards	100	205
Passing yards	229	227
Turnovers	3	3
Time of possession	29:18	30:42

Team	Category	Player	Statistics
Duke	Passing	Quentin Harris	22/39, 229 yards, TD, INT
Duke	Rushing	Deon Jackson	19 rushes, 91 yards
Duke	Receiving	Scott Bracy	5 receptions, 62 yards, TD
North Carolina	Passing	Sam Howell	10/26, 227 yards, 2 TD, 2 INT
North Carolina	Rushing	Javonte Williams	22 rushes, 111 yards
North Carolina	Receiving	Dazz Newsome	4 receptions, 103 yards, TD

=== Virginia ===
	1	2	3	4	Total
Cavaliers	7	10	21	0	38
Tar Heels	3	14	14	0	31

Statistics	UVA	UNC
First downs	28	25
Total yards	517	539
Rushing yards	134	186
Passing yards	383	353
Turnovers	0	0
Time of possession	33:38	26:22

Team	Category	Player	Statistics
Virginia	Passing	Bryce Perkins	30/39, 378 yards, 3 TD
Virginia	Rushing	Bryce Perkins	24 rushes, 112 yards, 2 TD
Virginia	Receiving	Terrell Jana	13 receptions, 146 yards
North Carolina	Passing	Sam Howell	15/29, 353 yards, 4 TD
North Carolina	Rushing	Javonte Williams	16 rushes, 98 yards
North Carolina	Receiving	Dyami Brown	6 receptions, 202 yards, 3 TD

=== At Pittsburgh ===
	1	2	3	4	OT	Total
Tar Heels	7	3	0	17	0	27
Panthers	3	14	7	3	7	34

Statistics	UNC	PITT
First downs	27	27
Total yards	458	498
Rushing yards	136	139
Passing yards	322	359
Turnovers	1	0
Time of possession	28:03	31:57

Team	Category	Player	Statistics
North Carolina	Passing	Sam Howell	27/43, 322 yards, 3 TD, INT
North Carolina	Rushing	Antonio Williams	12 rushes, 107 yards
North Carolina	Receiving	Dazz Newsome	11 receptions, 170 yards, TD
Pittsburgh	Passing	Kenny Pickett	25/41, 359 yards, TD
Pittsburgh	Rushing	A. J. Davis	19 rushes, 58 yards, TD
Pittsburgh	Receiving	Shocky Jacques−Louis	4 receptions, 104 yards, TD

=== Mercer ===
	1	2	3	4	Total
Bears	0	0	0	7	7
Tar Heels	21	21	14	0	56

Statistics	MER	UNC
First downs	14	21
Total yards	225	537
Rushing yards	64	376
Passing yards	161	161
Turnovers	2	0
Time of possession	33:48	26:12

Team	Category	Player	Statistics
Mercer	Passing	Harrison Frost	5/7, 92 yards, TD, INT
Mercer	Rushing	Tyray Devezin	20 rushes, 53 yards
Mercer	Receiving	David Durden	7 receptions, 69 yards
North Carolina	Passing	Sam Howell	10/13, 152 yards, 3 TD
North Carolina	Rushing	Michael Carter	9 rushes, 159 yards, 3 TD
North Carolina	Receiving	Dyami Brown	3 receptions, 83 yards, TD

=== At NC State ===
	1	2	3	4	Total
Tar Heels	0	6	28	7	41
Wolfpack	3	7	0	0	10

Statistics	UNC	NCST
First downs	27	16
Total yards	620	289
Rushing yards	180	132
Passing yards	440	157
Turnovers	1	4
Time of possession	36:24	23:36

Team	Category	Player	Statistics
North Carolina	Passing	Sam Howell	23/33, 401 yards, 3 TD, INT
North Carolina	Rushing	Michael Carter	16 rushes, 97 yards
North Carolina	Receiving	Dyami Brown	6 receptions, 150 yards, TD
NC State	Passing	Devin Leary	7/20, 98 yards, TD, 2 INT
NC State	Rushing	Jordan Houston	8 rushes, 62 yards
NC State	Receiving	Tabari Hines	7 receptions, 89 yards, TD

=== Vs. Temple (Military Bowl) ===
	1	2	3	4	Total
Tar Heels	7	13	21	14	55
Owls	0	6	7	0	13

Statistics	UNC	TEM
First downs	33	16
Total yards	534	272
Rushing yards	238	78
Passing yards	296	194
Turnovers	1	2
Time of possession	32:30	27:30

Team	Category	Player	Statistics
North Carolina	Passing	Sam Howell	25/34, 294 yards, 3 TD
North Carolina	Rushing	Javonte Williams	14 rushes, 85 yards
North Carolina	Receiving	Dyami Brown	5 receptions, 87 yards, TD
Temple	Passing	Anthony Russo	12/20, 128 yards, INT
Temple	Rushing	Ray Davis	15 rushes, 36 yards, TD
Temple	Receiving	Jadan Blue	8 receptions, 92 yards

== Players drafted into the NFL ==
Round	Pick	Player	Position	NFL club
4	126	Charlie Heck	OT	Houston Texans
5	154	Jason Strowbridge	DL	Miami Dolphins
