= 2007 Texas Longhorns football suspensions =

The 2007 Texas Longhorns football suspensions were separate incidents resulting in college football players being suspended from the 2007 Texas Longhorn football team at the University of Texas at Austin. Head coach Mack Brown suspended a total of seven players; six for alleged illegal activities, and one for a violation of National Collegiate Athletic Association (NCAA) rules.

== Prior to the season ==
Four Longhorn players were involved in legal issues during the off-season. Defensive end Henry Melton and linebacker Sergio Kindle were both arrested during the summer on charges of driving while intoxicated. Both players were suspended from the first three games of the season. They were required to do community service and also missed the first two days of practice to visit with a woman whose son was crippled by a drunk driver.

Freshman defensive tackle Andre Jones (who had not yet played for Texas but did join spring practices) and former UT player Robert Joseph were charged with aggravated robbery with a deadly weapon. Jones was one of the team's most highly touted recruits; his high school football career honors included Prep All-American, three-time all-state selection, first-team All-American by Parade Magazine, and Texas 4A Defensive Player of the Year by the Texas Sports Writers Association. R Head coach Mack Brown suspended Jones from the team indefinitely. Joseph, a sophomore playing safety, had been suspended from the Longhorn team in June after being arrested on misdemeanor charges of breaking into vehicles, and later announced that he was transferring. In suspending Jones, Brown said “I am extremely disappointed that four of our student-athletes have had issues with the law this summer. That is not reflective of the high standard of class, character and integrity we have established at Texas for many years. It’s a shame that these recent events have generated a great deal of negative attention, because I do think that overall, this is as good of a group of kids that I’ve ever coached. I think that will show over time.”

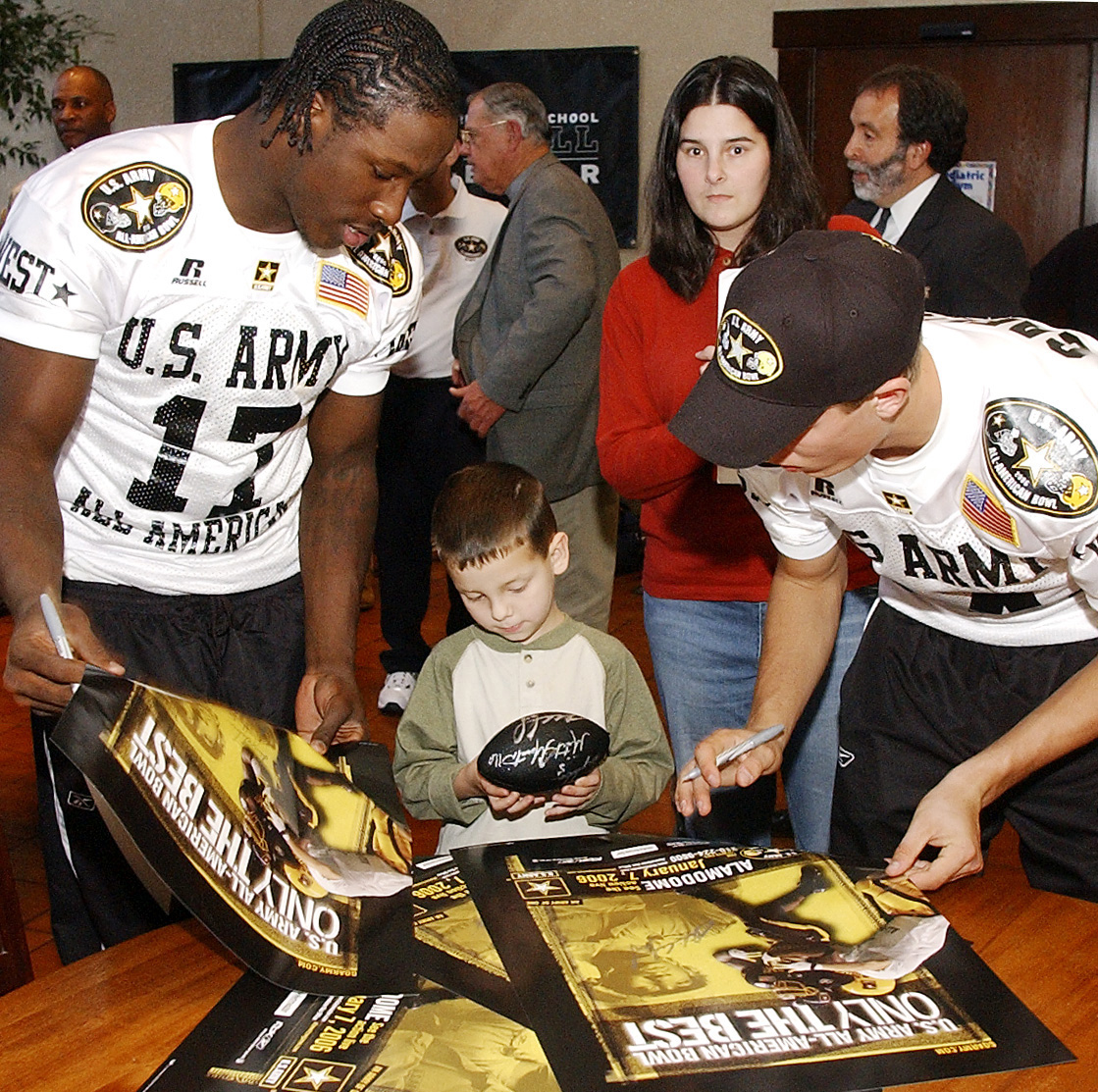
Sergio Kindle (left) signing autographs for children from the Warm Springs Rehabilitation Center in San Antonio in January 2006.

Brown apologized to the university's administrators, faculty, fans and students for the range of "embarrassing incidents" that occurred over the summer. "It's not what we have worked so hard for 9 ½ years to portray in our program of class, integrity and character," Brown said. "It's something we aren't proud of. But I can also assure you that it's not indicative of who this team really is. We're excited to be able to prove that." He allowed that something positive could come out of the troubles as it provides a learning and motivational opportunity. Brown said, "Our slogan [for the season] will be to 'earn the right,' because some people seem to have taken advantage of being at the University of Texas on a great team without [doing it] the right way. It's my job to make sure that the guys who are playing have earned that right."

On August 31, 2007 the University of Texas suspended Billy Pittman for three games because he accepted the use of a friend's car over the summer. The school's compliance office determined the friend was not a booster or agent and was not connected with the university but that the use of the car violated NCAA amateurism rules. The NCAA signed off on the findings. Pittman said in response to the suspension, "I want to apologize to my coaches, teammates, fans and everyone at the university for making this mistake. I was driving a friend's car and since he didn't have any ties to UT, I didn't think I was doing anything wrong. As soon as the coaches asked me about it this summer, I told them everything." Mack Brown released a statement saying, "I'm disappointed for Billy. I am confident he wouldn't intentionally do anything to be a distraction to our team. We look forward to his return for the Rice game." Pittman had been recovering from a sprained shoulder but had hoped to play in the season opener.

== During the season ==
On September 13, 2007 the University of Texas suspended Tyrell Gatewood indefinitely after he was arrested on two drug possession charges. A Travis County sheriff's deputy conducted a traffic stop on Gatewood for "failure to signal within 100 feet before changing lanes. The deputy said the car did use its left-turn signal, but only after it had stopped at the intersection". The deputy searched the car and found less than one-hundredth of an ounce of marijuana, along with two prescription drugs, Xanax and promethazine with codeine. The deputy did not find a prescription for the two-drugs so Gatewood was arrested and charged with two counts of possession of a dangerous drug, a Class A misdemeanor. Longhorn football player Ben Wells was also in the car. Wells was cited for possession of drug paraphernalia, a Class C misdemeanor, but he was not taken to jail and the team took no disciplinary action against Wells.

On September 17, 2007, James Henry was arrested on third-degree felony charges of "obstruction or retaliation and tampering or fabricating physical evidence." His player biography describes him as a "Physical, athletic second-year player who worked at running back during spring drills [and] gained valuable experience working at safety as a redshirt in 2006". Henry saw some action on special teams during the 2007 season. He was allegedly retaliating on behalf of teammate Robert Joseph, who was arrested over the summer on aggravated robbery charges. The Austin police department recorded a jail-house phone call Joseph made to Henry. Police say Henry told Joseph, “I went over there and whooped all them niggas last night, fool.” Police claim Henry went to the scene of the robbery and told one of the victims, “Bitches deserve to get kicked, so that’s what I am going to do!”. The witnesses said that Henry then kicked the victim six or seven times in the head and punched him repeatedly. Mack Brown issued a statement saying "It’s unfortunate that we have just been informed of the situation or we would have been able to address it when it allegedly occurred in July. We’ve talked with James and his family and have decided to suspend him indefinitely."

The Austin American-Statesman reported that police may have actually been seeking James Henry back in July when they arrested Andre Jones. When Robert Joseph was arrested, police said they were "police are still looking for a black man, described as 6-2 and weighing more than 220 pounds". One week later they arrested Jones, who was 6-foot-5 and 295 pounds. The Austin American-Statesman reported "That discrepancy led to some questions about possible mistaken identity regarding Jones in the days after his arrest. Now it appears that police were looking for Henry, who was listed at 6-foot-2 and 200 pounds." Henry had been questioned and released on the day of the robbery.

After Jones' arrest, University of Texas President William Charles Powers Jr. issued a statement concerning the suspensions and the team discipline. Powers said in part:

I applaud Coach Mack Brown for taking swift action in disciplining a member of his football team. I strongly endorse the penalties he has imposed on this player and others who have been arrested for various offenses. I know Coach Brown feels accountable for the conduct of his team and that these players must be held accountable for their own behavior on and off the field.
It is important for these young men to understand that with the celebrity that comes with being part of the football program comes an inherent responsibility. When they get involved in criminal behavior or act inappropriately they embarrass themselves, their teammates and respected former players who have built the tradition of Texas football, their coaching staff and their university.

On October 6, 2007, Tyrell Gatewood was arrested on two misdemeanor drug charges; marijuana possession and for possession on a controlled substance. Gatewood was still on indefinite suspension from the football team due to his arrest less than a month earlier.

== The team ==
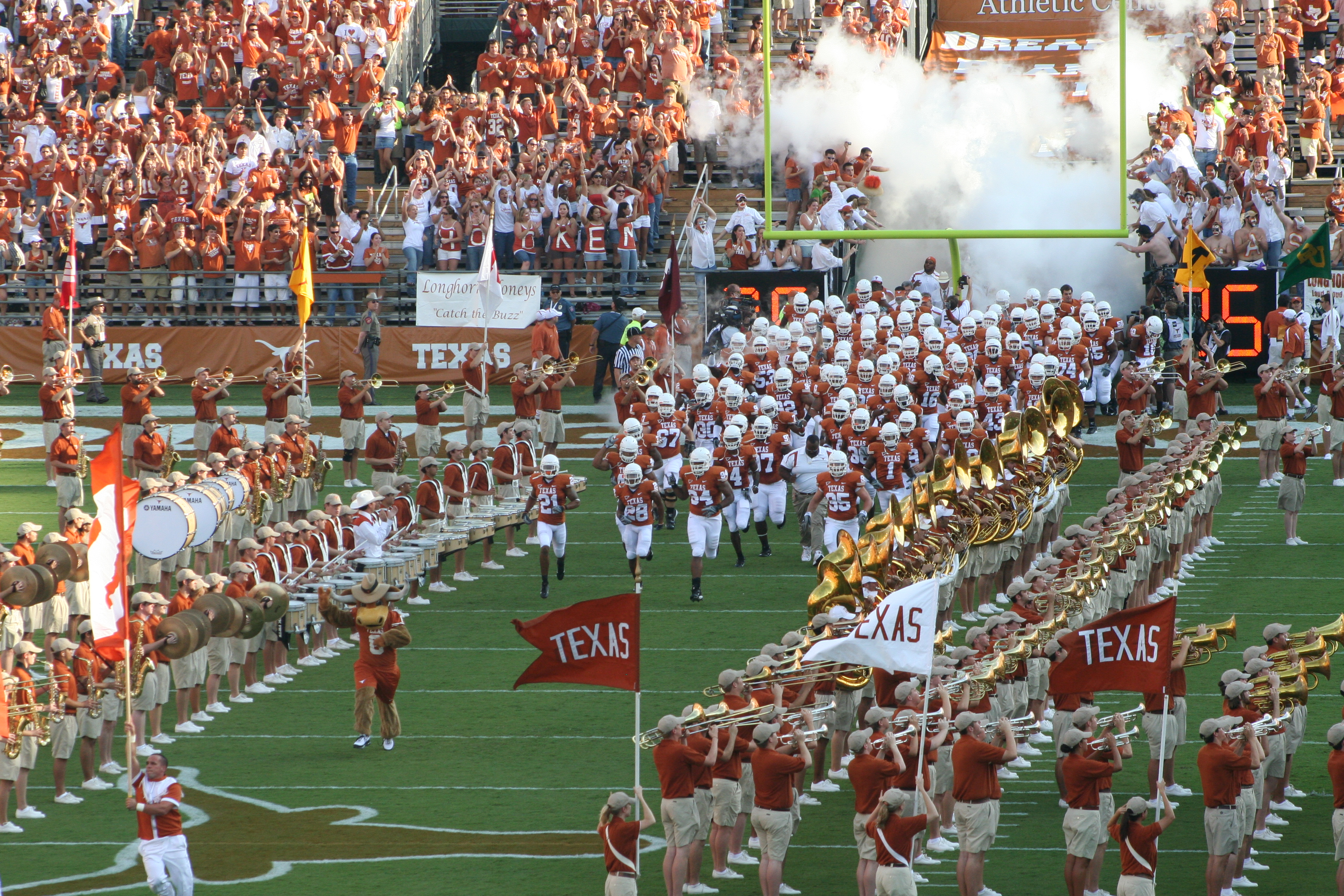
The 2007 Longhorns take the field on opening day against Arkansas State.

The 2007 Texas Longhorn football team was two years removed from the school's most recent college football championship, won by the 2005 Texas Longhorn football team. The 2006 team finished with 10 wins, 3 losses, including a victory in the 2006 Alamo Bowl. It received a final-ranking of 13th in the nation by both the Associated Press AP Poll and the USA Today Coaches Poll

The Longhorns entered the 2007 season ranked third in the all-time list of both total wins and winning percentage. A 2007 pre-season ranking by ESPN writer Mark Schlabach had the Longhorns ranked eighth, while College Football News had Texas ranked third. The Longhorns came into the season ranked fourth in both the Coaches Poll and AP Poll. Texas struggled in the first three games of the season. Their opening game was UT's first contest against Arkansas State University and the team narrowly achieved a victory. Next, they beat the TCU Horned Frogs in a game that required Texas to recover an onsides kick. For their first road game of the season, the Longhorns were the first opponent for the University of Central Florida (UCF) Knights in their new stadium. The Longhorns struggled in all three games and won by smaller margins than expected.

The Longhorns lost conference games to the Kansas State Wildcats, the Oklahoma Sooners, and the Texas A&M Aggies. They hung on to avoid upset attempts by lower-ranked Nebraska and Oklahoma State, the latter-game involving a 28-point fourth quarter comeback by the Horns. UT concluded their season with a 10–3 record by winning the 2007 Holiday Bowl against the Arizona State Sun Devils, another first-time opponent for Texas. They were ranked tenth in the final AP poll and in the USA Today coaches' poll.
