= 2019 Virginia Cavaliers football team =

American college football season

2019 Virginia Cavaliers football

ACC Coastal Division champion

ACC Championship Game, L 17–62 vs. Clemson

Orange Bowl, L 28–36 vs. Florida
- Conference: Atlantic Coast Conference
- Coastal Division

Ranking
- Coaches: No. 25
- Record: 9–5 (6–2 ACC)
- Head coach: Bronco Mendenhall (4th season)
- Offensive coordinator: Robert Anae (4th season)
- Offensive scheme: Multiple
- Defensive coordinator: Nick Howell (4th season)
- Co-defensive coordinator: Kelly Poppinga (2nd season)
- Base defense: 3–4
- Home stadium: Scott Stadium

Uniform
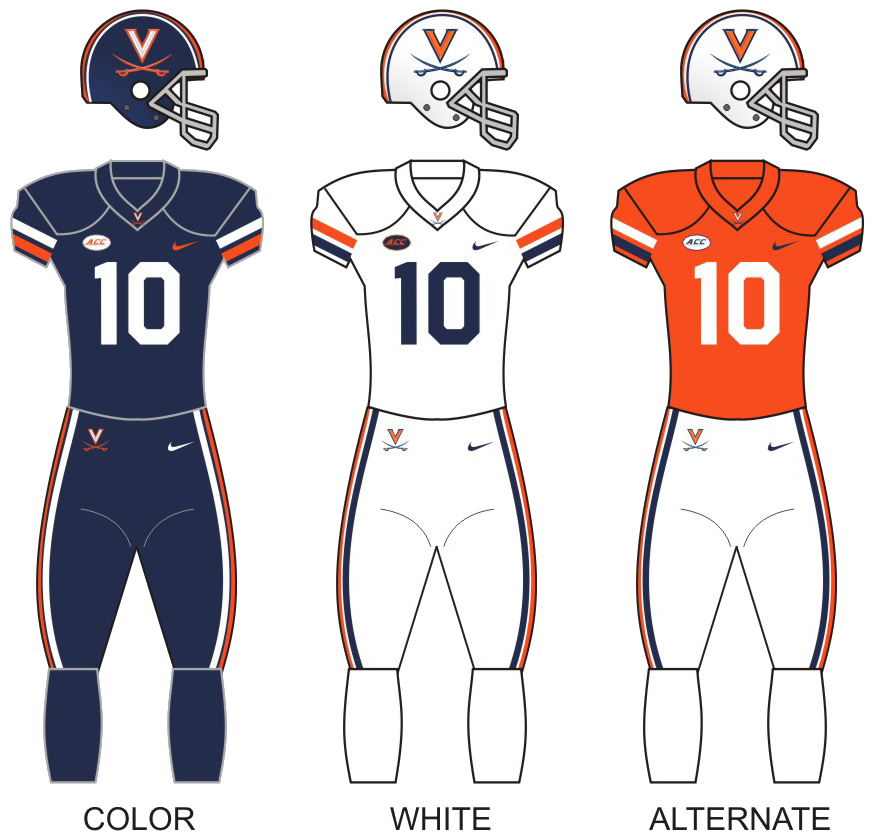

2019 Atlantic Coast Conference football standings
	Conf.			Overall
Team	W		L	W		L
Atlantic Division
No. 2 Clemson xy$^	8	–	0	14	–	1
Louisville	5	–	3	8	–	5
Wake Forest	4	–	4	8	–	5
Boston College	4	–	4	6	–	7
Florida State	4	–	4	6	–	7
Syracuse	2	–	6	5	–	7
NC State	1	–	7	4	–	8
Coastal Division
Virginia x	6	–	2	9	–	5
Virginia Tech	5	–	3	8	–	5
Pittsburgh	4	–	4	8	–	5
North Carolina	4	–	4	7	–	6
Miami (FL)	4	–	4	6	–	7
Duke	3	–	5	5	–	7
Georgia Tech	2	–	6	3	–	9
Championship: Clemson 62, Virginia 17
^ – College Football Playoff participant; $ – Conference champion; x – Division champion/co-champions; Rankings from AP Poll

The 2019 Virginia Cavaliers football team represented the University of Virginia during the 2019 NCAA Division I FBS football season. The Cavaliers were led by fourth-year head coach Bronco Mendenhall and played their home games at Scott Stadium. The team competed as members of the Atlantic Coast Conference.

Coming off an 8–5 season in 2018, Virginia was considered the favorite to win the Coastal Division. The Cavaliers began the season with four straight victories, but then lost three games in a four-game stretch to Notre Dame, Miami, and Louisville. The team rebounded with four straight victories to close out the regular season, including a win over rival and 24th-ranked Virginia Tech to secure Virginia's place in the ACC Championship Game. It was Virginia's first win over Virginia Tech since 2003, and it was the school's first appearance in the conference title game, concluding a seven-year stretch in which all seven members of the Coastal Division won the division. In the Championship Game, Virginia lost to Clemson, 62–17. The team received an invitation to the Orange Bowl to play Florida, where they lost 36–28, to end the season with a 9–5 record.

Virginia was led on offense by quarterback Bryce Perkins, who finished with 3,530 passing yards and 22 touchdowns, and was named second-team all-conference. Perkins also led the team in rushing, finishing with 769 yards and 11 touchdowns on the ground. Wide receiver and return specialist Joe Reed was named first-team all-conference as an all-purpose back. On defense, the team's leading tackler and sacks leader was linebacker Zane Zandier.

== Preseason ==
=== Preseason media poll ===
In the preseason ACC media poll, Virginia was predicted to win the Coastal Division, but received just one vote out of 173 to win the ACC Championship Game.

== Regular season ==
- In September, the Cavaliers defeated the Seminoles for the Jefferson-Eppes Trophy.
- In early November, the Cavaliers defeated the Tar Heels in the South's Oldest Rivalry.
- In late November, the Cavaliers defeated the Hokies for the Commonwealth Cup.

Bronco Mendenhall became the first coach to bring both trophies to Charlottesville at the same time. The Jefferson-Eppes Trophy may remain in Cavalier hands until at least 2025, as FSU does not appear on the ACC schedules for Virginia through 2024.

As projected by the pre-season media, Virginia won the Coastal division for the first time despite an early season-ending injury to the team's highest NFL prospect, Bryce Hall, in the game against Miami.

== Schedule ==
Date	Time	Opponent	Rank	Site	TV	Result	Attendance
August 31	7:30 p.m.	at Pittsburgh		Heinz Field; Pittsburgh, PA	ACCN	W 30–14	47,144
September 6	8:00 p.m.	William & Mary*		Scott Stadium; Charlottesville, VA	ACCN	W 52–17	45,250
September 14	7:30 p.m.	Florida State	No. 25	Scott Stadium; Charlottesville, VA (Jefferson-Eppes Trophy)	ACCN	W 31–24	57,826
September 21	7:00 p.m.	Old Dominion*	No. 21	Scott Stadium; Charlottesville, VA	ESPN2	W 28–17	44,573
September 28	3:30 p.m.	at No. 10 Notre Dame*	No. 18	Notre Dame Stadium; Notre Dame, IN	NBC	L 20–35	77,622
October 11	8:00 p.m.	at Miami (FL)	No. 20	Hard Rock Stadium; Miami Gardens, FL	ESPN	L 9–17	54,538
October 19	3:30 p.m.	Duke		Scott Stadium; Charlottesville, VA	ACCN	W 48–14	52,847
October 26	3:30 p.m.	at Louisville		Cardinal Stadium; Louisville, KY	ACCN	L 21–28	48,689
November 2	7:30 p.m.	at North Carolina		Kenan Memorial Stadium; Chapel Hill, NC (South's Oldest Rivalry)	ACCN	W 38–31	50,500
November 9	12:30 p.m.	Georgia Tech^{†}		Scott Stadium; Charlottesville, VA	ACCRSN	W 33–28	44,596
November 23	12:00 p.m.	Liberty*		Scott Stadium; Charlottesville, VA	ACCRSN	W 55–27	37,329
November 29	12:00 p.m.	No. 24 Virginia Tech		Scott Stadium; Charlottesville, VA (Commonwealth Cup)	ABC	W 39–30	52,619
December 7	7:30 p.m.	vs. No. 3 Clemson	No. 23	Bank of America Stadium; Charlotte, NC (ACC Championship Game)	ABC	L 17–62	66,810
December 30	8:00 p.m.	vs. No. 9 Florida*	No. 24	Hard Rock Stadium; Miami Gardens, FL (Orange Bowl)	ESPN	L 28–36	65,157
*Non-conference game; ^{†}Homecoming; Rankings from AP Poll and CFP Rankings after November 5 released prior to game; All times are in Eastern time

== Personnel ==
=== Coaching staff ===
Staff as of 2019.

Name	Position
Bronco Mendenhall	Head coach
Nick Howell	Defensive coordinator, secondary coach
Kelly Poppinga	Co defensive coordinator, Outside Linebackers coach
Shane Hunter	Inside linebackers coach
Vic So'oto	Defensive line
Robert Anae	Offensive coordinator, inside receivers coach
Mark Atuaia	Running backs coach
Jason Beck	Quarterbacks coach
Marques Hagans	Wide receivers coach
Garett Tujague	Offensive line coach
Ricky Brumfield	Special teams coordinator

=== Roster ===
2019 Virginia Cavaliers football team roster
Players
Coaches
Offense

Pos.	#	Name	Class
WR	2	Joe Reed	Sr
QB	3	Bryce Perkins	Sr
TB	5	Lamont Atkins	Jr
TB	6	PK Kier	Jr
WR	8	Hasise Dubois	Sr
QB	10	Brennan Armstrong	Fr
WR	13	Terrell Jana	Jr
WR	18	Ben Hogg	Sr
WR	19	Chuck Davis	Jr
RB	20	Mike Hollins	Fr
TB	21	Wayne Taulapapa	So
FB	27	Jamari Peacock	Jr
TB	31	Chris Sharp	Sr
QB	36	Lindell Stone	So
RB	37	Perris Jones	Fr
QB	40	R. J. Harvey	Fr
TE	44	Tanner Cowley	Sr
TE	46	Christian Baumgardner	Jr
FB	46	Andrew Yavinsky	So
OT	50	Tommy Christ	So
WR	51	Jalen Harrison	Jr
G	52	Joe Bissinger	Fr
OT	54	Ryan Nelson	So
C	55	Olusegun Oluwatimi	So
WR	59	Andrew Spaziani	Jr
C	63	Tyler Fannin	So
G	64	Ben Trent	Jr
OT	65	Jonathan Leech	Fr
OT	67	Derek Devine	Fr
WR	68	Sean Moore	Fr
OT	69	Chris Glaser	Jr
OT	70	Bobby Haskins	So
OT	72	Ryan Swoboda	So
OT	75	Ja'Quay Hubbard	Fr
WR	77	Josh Clifford	Fr
G	79	Dillon Reinkensmeyer	Jr
HB	80	Billy Kemp IV	So
WR	82	Brandon White	Fr
WR	83	Hayden Mitchell	So
WR	84	Dorien Goddard	Fr
TE	85	Grant Misch	Fr
WR	86	Ugo Obasi	So
WR	87	Dontayvion Wicks	Fr
WR	88	Tavares Kelly Jr.	So
WR	89	Dejon Brissett	Sr
RB	96	Seneca Milledge	Fr
G		Kariem Al Soufi	Fr
WR		Nathaniel Beal III	Fr
G		Charlie Boxley	Fr
WR		Terrell Chatman	Sr
OT		Alex Gellerstedt	Fr
OT		Landry Gerbers	Fr
WR		John Izlar	Fr
OT		Jack Keenan	RFr
WR		Zack Kindel	Fr
TE		T. J. Kitts	So
TE		Mike Kosar
G		Micah Mariteragi	RFr
QB		Jared Rayman	Fr
G		Zachary Teter	Fr
C/G		Gerrik Vollmer	So
G		Martin Weisz	RFr
QB		Luke Wentz	Fr
RB		Justin Zollar	Sr

Defense

Pos.	#	Name	Class
CB	1	Nick Grant	Jr
ILB	4	Jordan Mack	Sr
FS	7	Chris Moore	Jr
DL	9	Samson Reed	Fr
OLB	11	Charles Snowden	Jr
OLB	14	Noah Taylor	So
FS	15	De'Vante Cross	Jr
DE	16	Richard Burney	Sr
OLB	17	Elliott Brown	Jr
ILB	22	Robert Snyder	Jr
CB	23	Heskin Smith	So
DB	25	Joseph White	Fr
FS	28	Brenton Nelson	Jr
FS	29	Joey Blount	Jr
DB	30	Antonio Clary	Fr
CB	30	Myles Robinson	Jr
CB	32	Darrius Bratton	Jr
ILB	33	Zane Zandier	Jr
CB	34	Bryce Hall	Sr
ILB	38	T. C. Harrison	Fr
CB	39	Jaylon Baker	Fr
CB	41	Germane Crowell	So
41	41	Darnell Pratt	So
ILB	42	Nick Jackson	Fr
ILB	45	Reed Kellam	Sr
OLB	47	Dre Bryant	Jr
DB	49	Coen King	Fr
DB	53	Fentrell Cypress II	Fr
OLB	56	Matt Gahm	Jr
OLB	57	Colin Dixon	So
DT	58	Eli Hanback	Sr
DB	60	Chayce Chalmers	Fr
OLB	66	Jairus Satiu	Fr
S	71	Darren Klein	Fr
DB	74	Jake Dewease	Fr
NT	76	Jordan Redmond	So
DB	90	Major Williams	Fr
DE	91	Mandy Alonso	Jr
DB	92	Tenyeh Dixon	Fr
OLB	93	Hunter Stewart	Fr
DT	94	Aaron Faumui	So
DE	95	Ben Smiley III	Fr
OLB	98	D'Sean Perry	Fr
DT	99	Jowon Briggs	So
ILB		Josh Ahern	Fr
DL		Isaac Buell	So
DB		Jude Carlon	Fr
CB		Mark Chichester	RFr
LB		Evan Clark	RFr
DE		Sam Galletta	Fr
ILB		DaJuan Moore	RFr
LB		Aidan Saunders	Fr
S		Vinnie Vladic	RFr

Special teams

Pos.	#	Name	Class
K	26	Brian Delaney	Jr
K	43	Justin Duenkel	Fr
LS	61	Enzo Anthony	Fr
LS	62	Lee Dudley	Fr
PK/P	81	Nash Griffin	Jr
PK	89	Hunter Pearson	Fr
PK	95	A. J. Mejia	Jr
P		Brendan Farrell	Fr
LS		Tucker Finkelston	Fr

Head coach

- Bronco Mendenhall (Oregon State)

Coordinators/assistant coaches

- Robert Anae (BYU)
  Offensive coordinator, inside receivers
- Marques Hagans (Virginia)
  Wide receivers
- Mark Atuaia (BYU)
  Running backs
- Garett Tujague (BYU)
  Offensive line
- Jason Beck (BYU)
  Quarterbacks
- Vic So'oto (BYU)
  Defensive line
- Nick Howell (Weber State)
  Defensive coordinator, secondary
- Kelly Poppinga (BYU)
  Co-defensive coordinator, outside linebackers
- Shane Hunter (BYU)
  Inside linebackers
- Rickey Brumfield (Utah State)
  Special teams coordinator
- Patrick Hickman (BYU)
  Director of football operations
- Justin Anderson (BYU)
  Director of player personnel
- Jordan Arcement (Nicholls State)
  Assistant director of player personnel
- Shawn Griswold (Utah State)
  Director of football training & player development
- Matt Edwards (BYU)
  Football analyst
- Kirk Garner (Virginia)
  Graduate assistant
- C.J. Stalker (Virginia)
  Graduate assistant
- Jackson Matteo (Virginia)
  Graduate assistant
- Andrew Meyer (Wisconsin)
  Graduate assistant

Legend

- (C) Team captain
- (S) Suspended
- (I) Ineligible
- Injured
- Redshirt

Roster
Last update: 2018-07-27

=== Depth chart ===
Defense

FS
Joey Blount
De'Vante Cross
⋅

WLB	BLB	MLB	SLB
Noah Taylor	Zane Zandier	Jordan Mack	Charles Snowden
Matt Gahm	Robert Snyder	Nick Jackson	Elliott Brown
⋅	⋅	⋅	⋅

SABRE
Brenton Nelson
Chris Moore
⋅

CB
Nick Grant
Jaylon Baker
⋅

DE	NT	DE
Eli Hanback	Jowon Briggs	Richard Burney
Mandy Alonso	Jordan Redmond	Aaron Faumui
⋅	⋅	Tommy Christ

CB
Bryce Hall
Heskin Smith
⋅

Offense

WR (X)
Terrell Jana
Terrell Chatman
Billy Kemp IV

WR
Joe Reed
Tavares Kelly Jr
Chuck Davis

LT	LG	C	RG	RT
Ryan Swoboda	Ryan Nelson	Olusegun Oluwatimi	Chris Glaser	Dillon Reinkensmeyer
Bobby Haskins	Joe Bissinger	Tyler Fannin	Ja'Quay Hubbard	Derek Devine
⋅	⋅	⋅	⋅	⋅

TE
Tanner Cowley
Grant Misch
⋅

WR (Y)
Hasise Dubois
Dontayvion Wicks
Dorian Goddard

QB
Bryce Perkins
Brennan Armstrong
Lindell Stone

Key reserves
KO Brian Delaney

RB
Wayne Taulapapa
PK Kier
Lamont Atkins

Special teams
PK Brian Delaney
PK Justin Duenkel
P Nash Griffin
P Brian Delaney
KR Joe Reed
KR Perris Jones
PR Chuck Davis
PR Tavares Kelly Jr
LS Lee Dudley
LS Enzo Anthony
H Nash Griffin

== Game summaries ==
=== At Pittsburgh ===
	1	2	3	4	Total
Cavaliers	10	3	10	7	30
Panthers	0	14	0	0	14

=== William & Mary ===
	1	2	3	4	Total
Tribe	0	3	7	7	17
Cavaliers	21	14	7	10	52

=== Florida State ===
	1	2	3	4	Total
Seminoles	0	14	3	7	24
No. 25 Cavaliers	3	7	0	21	31

=== Old Dominion ===
	1	2	3	4	Total
Monarchs	10	7	0	0	17
No. 21 Cavaliers	0	7	7	14	28

=== At Notre Dame ===
	1	2	3	4	Total
No. 18 Cavaliers	7	10	0	3	20
No. 10 Fighting Irish	14	0	14	7	35

=== At Miami (FL) ===
	1	2	3	4	Total
No. 20 Cavaliers	0	3	0	6	9
Hurricanes	7	0	0	10	17

=== Duke ===
	1	2	3	4	Total
Blue Devils	0	0	7	7	14
Cavaliers	0	17	24	7	48

=== At Louisville ===
	1	2	3	4	Total
Cavaliers	7	7	0	7	21
Cardinals	7	0	7	14	28

=== At North Carolina ===
	1	2	3	4	Total
Cavaliers	7	10	21	0	38
Tar Heels	3	14	14	0	31

=== Georgia Tech ===
	1	2	3	4	Total
Yellow Jackets	14	7	0	7	28
Cavaliers	14	10	0	9	33

=== Liberty ===
	1	2	3	4	Total
Flames	7	7	7	6	27
Cavaliers	10	14	14	17	55

=== Virginia Tech ===
	1	2	3	4	Total
No. 24 Hokies	3	3	21	3	30
Cavaliers	13	0	7	19	39

=== Clemson (ACC Championship game) ===
	1	2	3	4	Total
No. 23 Cavaliers	7	0	7	3	17
No. 3 Tigers	14	17	14	17	62

=== Vs. Florida (Orange Bowl) ===
	1	2	3	4	Total
No. 24 Cavaliers	7	7	0	14	28
No. 9 Gators	14	10	3	9	36

== Rankings ==
Ranking movements Legend: ██ Increase in ranking ██ Decrease in ranking — = Not ranked RV = Received votes
	Week																
Poll	Pre	1	2	3	4	5	6	7	8	9	10	11	12	13	14	15	Final
AP	RV	RV	25	21	18	23	20	RV	RV	RV	RV	RV	RV	RV	22	RV	RV
Coaches	RV	RV	RV	22	18	22	19	RV	RV	RV	RV	RV	RV	RV	22	25	25
CFP	Not released										—	—	—	—	23	24	Not released

== Players drafted into the NFL ==
Round	Pick	Player	Position	NFL Club
5	151	Joe Reed	WR	Los Angeles Chargers
5	158	Bryce Hall	CB	New York Jets
