= 2019 Virginia Tech Hokies football team =

American college football season

2019 Virginia Tech Hokies football

Belk Bowl, L 30–37 vs. Kentucky
- Conference: Atlantic Coast Conference
- Coastal Division
- Record: 8–5 (5–3 ACC)
- Head coach: Justin Fuente (4th season)
- Offensive coordinator: Brad Cornelsen (4th season)
- Offensive scheme: Spread
- Defensive coordinator: Bud Foster (25th season)
- Base defense: 4–4
- Home stadium: Lane Stadium

Uniform
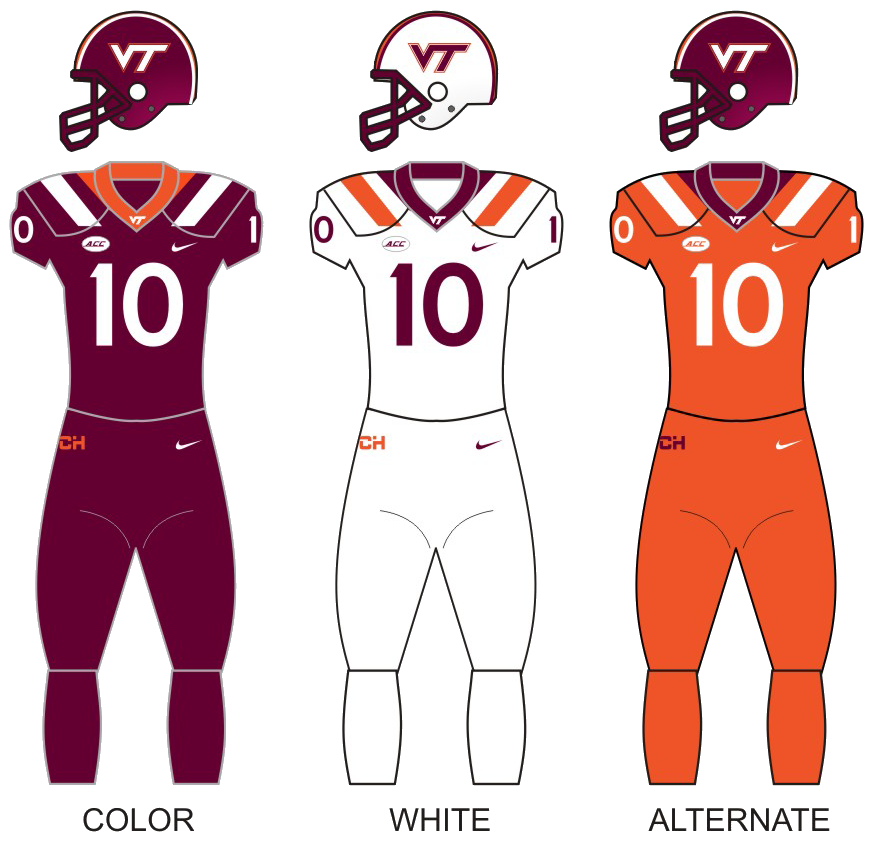

2019 Atlantic Coast Conference football standings
	Conf.			Overall
Team	W		L	W		L
Atlantic Division
No. 2 Clemson xy$^	8	–	0	14	–	1
Louisville	5	–	3	8	–	5
Wake Forest	4	–	4	8	–	5
Boston College	4	–	4	6	–	7
Florida State	4	–	4	6	–	7
Syracuse	2	–	6	5	–	7
NC State	1	–	7	4	–	8
Coastal Division
Virginia x	6	–	2	9	–	5
Virginia Tech	5	–	3	8	–	5
Pittsburgh	4	–	4	8	–	5
North Carolina	4	–	4	7	–	6
Miami (FL)	4	–	4	6	–	7
Duke	3	–	5	5	–	7
Georgia Tech	2	–	6	3	–	9
Championship: Clemson 62, Virginia 17
^ – College Football Playoff participant; $ – Conference champion; x – Division champion/co-champions; Rankings from AP Poll

The 2019 Virginia Tech Hokies football team represented Virginia Tech during the 2019 NCAA Division I FBS football season. The Hokies were led by fourth-year head coach Justin Fuente and played their home games at Lane Stadium in Blacksburg, Virginia. They competed as members of the Coastal Division of the Atlantic Coast Conference (ACC). The Hokies lost to arch rival Virginia for the first time since 2003. The loss cost the Hokies the Coastal Division and a trip to the Orange Bowl.

On August 1, 2019, defensive coordinator Bud Foster announced that he would be retiring at the end of the season. At the time of his retirement, Foster had been an assistant at Virginia Tech for 33 seasons, making him the longest serving assistant coach at the same school.

== Preseason ==
=== Preseason media poll ===
In the preseason ACC media poll, Virginia Tech was predicted to finish in third in the Coastal Division.

== Schedule ==
In non-conference play, Virginia Tech played home games against Old Dominion of Conference USA, Furman of the Southern Conference, and Rhode Island of the Colonial Athletic Association, as well as a road game against Notre Dame, a football independent. In ACC play, the Hokies would play the other members of the Coastal Division as well as Boston College and Wake Forest from the Atlantic Division.

Date	Time	Opponent	Rank	Site	TV	Result	Attendance
August 31	4:00 p.m.	at Boston College		Alumni Stadium; Chestnut Hill, MA (rivalry)	ACCN	L 28–35	35,213
September 7	12:00 p.m.	Old Dominion*		Lane Stadium; Blacksburg, VA	ESPNU	W 31–17	57,282
September 14	12:00 p.m.	No. 16 (FCS) Furman*		Lane Stadium; Blacksburg, VA	ACCN	W 24–17	52,314
September 27	7:00 p.m.	Duke		Lane Stadium; Blacksburg, VA	ESPN	L 10–45	59,537
October 5	3:30 p.m.	at Miami (FL)		Hard Rock Stadium; Miami Gardens, FL (rivalry)	ESPN	W 42–35	53,183
October 12	4:00 p.m.	Rhode Island*		Lane Stadium; Blacksburg, VA	ACCN	W 34–17	51,716
October 19	3:30 p.m.	North Carolina^{†}		Lane Stadium; Blacksburg, VA	ACCRSN	W 43–41 ^{6OT}	65,632
November 2	2:30 p.m.	at No. 16 Notre Dame*		Notre Dame Stadium; Notre Dame, IN	NBC	L 20–21	77,622
November 9	3:30 p.m.	No. 19 Wake Forest		Lane Stadium; Blacksburg, VA	ACCN	W 36–17	65,632
November 16	3:30 p.m.	at Georgia Tech		Bobby Dodd Stadium; Atlanta, GA (rivalry)	ACCRSN	W 45–0	43,263
November 23	3:30 p.m.	Pittsburgh		Lane Stadium; Blacksburg, VA	ESPN2	W 28–0	55,936
November 29	12:00 p.m.	at Virginia	No. 24	Scott Stadium; Charlottesville, VA (Commonwealth Cup)	ABC	L 30–39	52,619
December 31	12:00 p.m.	vs. Kentucky*		Bank of America Stadium; Charlotte, North Carolina (Belk Bowl)	ESPN	L 30–37	44,138
*Non-conference game; ^{†}Homecoming; Rankings from AP Poll and CFP Rankings after November 5 released prior to game; All times are in Eastern time

== Personnel ==
2019 Virginia Tech Hokies football team roster
Players
Coaches
Offense

Pos.	#	Name	Class
QB	2	Hendon Hooker	So
QB	3	Braxton Burmeister	So
QB	4	Quincy Patterson II	Fr
QB	5	Ryan Willis	Sr
WR	6	Hezekiah Grimsley	Jr
QB	6	Trevor Jackson	Fr
WR	8	Phil Patterson	Jr
WR	9	Luke Bussel	Fr
WR	11	Tré Turner	So
QB	12	Knox Kadum	Fr
RB	13	Jalen Holston	Jr
WR	14	Damon Hazelton	Jr
WR	16	Darryle Simmons	Fr
RB	24	Terius Wheatley	So
TE	29	Dalton Keene (C)	Jr
RB	30	Caleb Steward	Fr
RB	33	DeShawn McClease	Jr
WR	34	Tink Boyd	Fr
RB	35	Keshawn King	Fr
RB	37	Carter Rivenburg	Fr
RB	38	Nashaun Overton	So
RB	39	Tahj Gary	Fr
WR	40	Travis Williams	Fr
TE	41	Ty Eller	Jr
TE	42	Cole Blaker	So
RB	43	Cole Beck	Fr
RB	44	J'Wan Evans	Fr
WR	45	Jacob Van Landingham	Fr
RB	46	Malik Bell	Fr
WR	47	John Ransom	Fr
WR	48	Nikia Peerman	Fr
WR	49	William Kakavitsas	Fr
OL	50	Will Pritchard	Fr
OL	51	Gene Kastelburg	So
OL	52	Austin Cannon	Jr
G	54	Lecitus Smith	So
OL	58	Walker Culver	Fr
OL	60	Silas Dzansi	So
OL	61	Bryan Hudson	Fr
OL	61	Gabe Sesco	Fr
OL	66	Louis Mihota	Fr
G	71	T. J. Jackson	Jr
OL	72	Jesse Hanson	Fr
OL	74	Doug Nester	Fr
OL	75	Zachariah Hoyt	Jr
OL	76	Brock Hoffman	Jr
OT	77	Christian Darrisaw	So
OL	79	Tyrell Smith (C)	Sr
WR	80	Kaleb Smith	Fr
TE	82	James Mitchell	So
WR	83	Tayvion Robinson	Fr
WR	85	Jaden Payoute	Fr
TE	86	Nick Gallo	Fr
WR	87	Jacob Pinckney	Fr
WR	88	Elijah Bowick	Fr
TE	89	Drake Deiluiis	So
TE	90	Sam Brooks	Fr
WR	94	Conner Dusenbury	Fr
OT	95	Luke Tenuta	Fr
WR	97	Keondré Banks	Jr

Defense

Pos.	#	Name	Class
DB	1	Reggie Floyd (C)	Sr
DB	2	Jeremy Webb	Jr
DB	3	Caleb Farley	So
LB	4	Dax Hollifield	So
DL	5	Jarrod Hewitt (C)	Jr
DB	7	Devon Hunter	So
DL	8	Emmanuel Belmar	Jr
DB	9	Khalil Ladler	Jr
DB	12	Nadir Thompson	Fr
DL	13	Zion Debose	So
LB	15	Keshon Artis	So
DB	17	Divine Deablo	Jr
DB	18	Tyree Rodgers	Jr
DB	19	J. R. Walker	Fr
DB	20	Ny'Quee Hawkins	Fr
DB	22	Chamarri Conner	So
LB	23	Rayshard Ashby	Jr
DB	26	Jovonn Quillen	Sr
DB	27	Armani Chatman	Fr
DB	28	Jermaine Waller	So
DB	29	Ishmiel Seisay	Sr
DB	30	Tyler Matheny	Fr
DB	31	Nasir Peoples	Fr
DB	32	Hunter Green	Fr
LB	34	Alan Tisdale	Fr
LB	35	Matt Johnson	Fr
DL	36	DaShawn Crawford	Jr
DB	37	Brion Murray	So
LB	38	Amaré Barno	Jr
LB	40	Ben Skinner	Fr
DL	41	Jaylen Griffin	So
LB	43	Michael Peterson	Fr
LB	44	Dylan Rivers	Jr
DL	45	TyJuan Garbutt	So
DL	46	Eli Adams	Fr
LB	47	Dean Ferguson	Fr
LB	48	Daniel Griffith	Jr
DB	49	Ed Robinson	Fr
LB	50	Tré Maxwell	Fr
DL	53	Aiden Brown	So
DL	58	Josh Fuga	Fr
DL	90	Jaevon Becton	Fr
DL	92	Jaden Cunningham	Jr
DL	93	Mario Kendricks	Fr
DL	94	Nigel Simmons	Fr
DL	96	Norell Pollard	Fr
DL	99	Maxx Philpott	Fr

Special teams

Pos.	#	Name	Class
LS	64	Sam DeLuke	Fr
LS	85	C. J. Scott	Fr
P	91	Oscar Bradburn	Jr
K	92	Mark Applegate	Fr
K	93	Brian Johnson	Jr
K	96	John Parker Romo	Jr
LS	97	Oscar Shadley	So
K	98	Caleb Quick	Fr
LS	99	Justin Pollock	Fr

Head coach

- Justin Fuente

Coordinators/assistant coaches

- Zohn Burden (RB)
- Brad Cornelsen (OC/QB)
- Bud Foster (Assoc. HC/DC/LB)
- Justin Hamilton (S)
- Ben Hilgart (Str + Cond)
- Jerry Kill (Spec. Asst.)
- Adam Lechtenberg (Ast. HC/Exec. Dir. of Play Dev.)
- Brian Mitchell (CB)
- James Shibest (ST/TE)
- John Tezzi (Recruiting)
- Vance Vice (OL)
- Charley Wiles (DL)
- Jafar Williams (WR)

Legend

- (C) Team captain
- (S) Suspended
- (I) Ineligible
- Injured
- Redshirt

== Game summaries ==
=== At Boston College ===
	1	2	3	4	Total
Hokies	7	7	7	7	28
Eagles	7	21	0	7	35

=== Old Dominion ===
	1	2	3	4	Total
Monarchs	3	0	7	7	17
Hokies	10	7	7	7	31

=== Furman ===
	1	2	3	4	Total
No. 16 (FCS) Paladins	0	14	0	3	17
Hokies	3	0	14	7	24

=== Duke ===
	1	2	3	4	Total
Blue Devils	0	21	10	14	45
Hokies	3	0	7	0	10

=== At Miami (FL) ===
	1	2	3	4	Total
Hokies	21	7	0	14	42
Hurricanes	0	7	7	21	35

=== Rhode Island ===
	1	2	3	4	Total
Rams	0	6	11	0	17
Hokies	10	7	7	10	34

=== North Carolina ===
	1	2	3	4	OT	2OT	3OT	4OT	5OT	6OT	Total
Tar Heels	10	7	7	7	3	7	0	0	0	0	41
Hokies	7	14	0	10	3	7	0	0	0	2	43

Starting with the 2019 season, every overtime period starting with the fifth overtime consists solely of one two-point attempt per team from the three yard line.

=== At Notre Dame ===
	1	2	3	4	Total
Hokies	7	7	3	3	20
No. 16 Fighting Irish	7	7	0	7	21

After poor performances against USC and Michigan, Notre Dame stepped up defensively against Virginia Tech. The hokies were held to their lowest total yards game since 2015 and lowest yards per play since 2016 in what was billed as "one of the best group effort performances" ever seen by Sports Illustrated sportswriter Bryan Driskell. Yet, Notre Dame still needed a late touchdown to win the game by a final score 21-20 and Notre Dame extended their home winning streak to 16 games.

=== Wake Forest ===
	1	2	3	4	Total
No. 22 Demon Deacons	3	7	7	0	17
Hokies	3	3	17	13	36

=== At Georgia Tech ===
	1	2	3	4	Total
Hokies	14	17	14	0	45
Yellow Jackets	0	0	0	0	0

=== Pittsburgh ===
	1	2	3	4	Total
Panthers	0	0	0	0	0
Hokies	14	7	0	7	28

=== At Virginia ===
	1	2	3	4	Total
No. 24 Hokies	3	3	21	3	30
Cavaliers	13	0	7	19	39

=== vs Kentucky (Belk Bowl) ===
	1	2	3	4	Total
Hokies	10	7	10	3	30
Wildcats	7	7	10	13	37

== Honorary #25 Beamer Jersey ==
Since the start of the 2016 season, during the week before each game, Head Coach Justin Fuente selects an outstanding player to wear the #25 jersey in honor of former head coach, Frank Beamer, who wore #25 as a player for Virginia Tech. The jersey represents hard work, toughness, good sportsmanship and being an exemplary teammate. At first, the distinction was intended strictly for special teams players, but has since been expanded to include all team members.

The players honored in the 2019 season are:

Game	Opponent	Player(s)
Game 1	Boston College	Tyree Rodgers
Game 2	Old Dominion	Divine Deablo (2)
Game 3	Furman	Dylan Rivers
Game 4	Duke	Oscar Bradburn (3)
Game 5	Miami	Jarrod Hewitt
Game 6	Rhode Island	Devon Hunter
Game 7	North Carolina	Rayshard Ashby
Game 8	Notre Dame	Armani Chatman
Game 9	Wake Forest	Divine Deablo (3)
Game 10	Georgia Tech	Khalil Ladler (2)
Game 11	Pittsburgh	James Mitchell
Game 12	Virginia	Dalton Keene (2) & Rayshard Ashby (2)
Belk Bowl	Kentucky	Brian Johnson

== Rankings ==
Ranking movements Legend: ██ Increase in ranking ██ Decrease in ranking — = Not ranked RV = Received votes
	Week																
Poll	Pre	1	2	3	4	5	6	7	8	9	10	11	12	13	14	15	Final
AP	RV	—	—	—	—	—	—	—	—	RV	RV	RV	25	23	RV	—	
Coaches	RV	—	—	—	—	—	—	—	RV	RV	RV	RV	RV	23	RV	RV	
CFP	Not released										—	—	—	24	—	—	Not released

== Players drafted into the NFL ==
Round	Pick	Player	Position	NFL Club
3	101	Dalton Keene	TE	New England Patriots
