= Joey Blount =

American football player (born 1998)

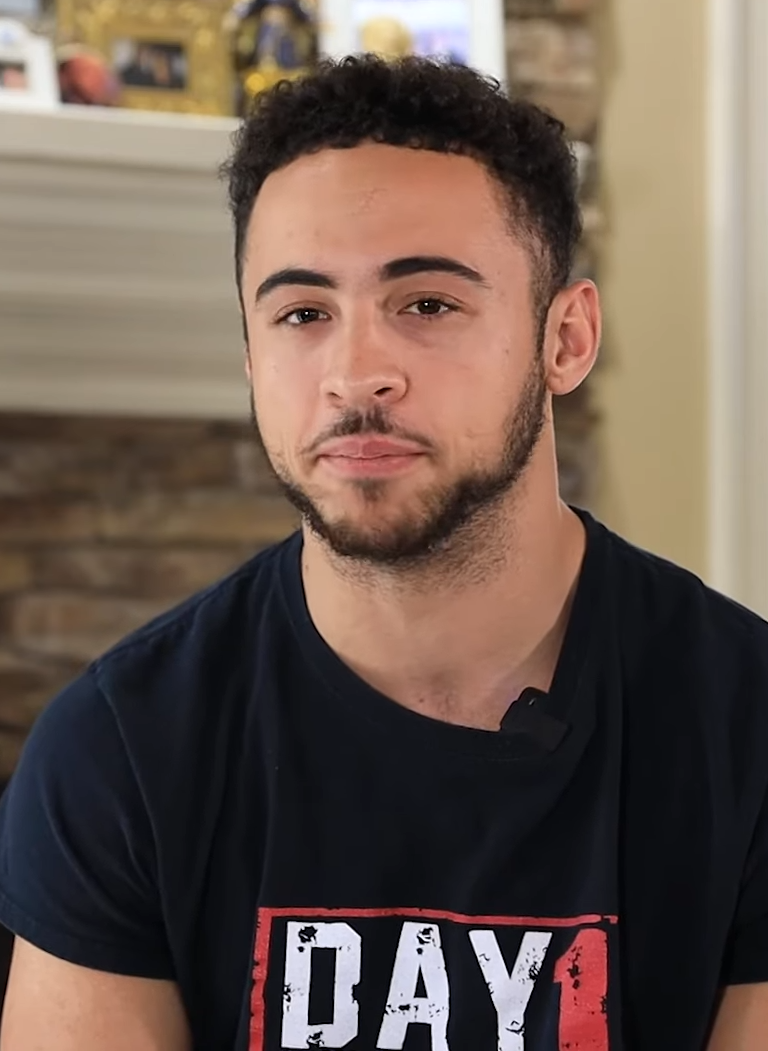
- Blount in 2022

No. 32 – Arizona Cardinals
- Position: Safety
- Roster status: Injured reserve

Personal information
- Born: November 16, 1998 (age 27); Atlanta, Georgia, U.S.
- Listed height: 6 ft 1 in (1.85 m)
- Listed weight: 195 lb (88 kg)

Career information
- High school: Landmark Christian) (Fairburn, Georgia)
- College: Virginia (2017–2021)
- NFL draft: 2022: undrafted

Career history
- Seattle Seahawks (2022); Arizona Cardinals (2023–present)

Awards and highlights
- Third-team All-ACC (2019)

Career NFL statistics as of 2025
- Total tackles: 20
- Forced fumbles: 2
- Fumble recoveries: 1
- Pass deflections: 1
- Interceptions: 1
- Stats at Pro Football Reference

Joseph Blount (born November 16, 1998) is an American professional football safety for the Arizona Cardinals of the National Football League (NFL). He played college football for the Virginia Cavaliers.

== Professional career ==
Pre-draft measurables
Height	Weight	Arm length	Hand span	Wingspan	40-yard dash	10-yard split	20-yard split	20-yard shuttle	Three-cone drill	Vertical jump	Broad jump	Bench press
6 ft 1 in (1.85 m)	201 lb (91 kg)	30 3/4 in (0.78 m)	9 3/8 in (0.24 m)	6 ft 3 in (1.91 m)	4.45 s	1.52 s	2.50 s	4.33 s	6.90 s	38.0 in (0.97 m)	10 ft 7 in (3.23 m)	20 reps
All values from Pro Day

=== Seattle Seahawks ===
Blount signed with the Seattle Seahawks as an undrafted free agent on April 30, 2022, following the 2022 NFL draft. He made the Seahawks' 53-man final roster out of training camp. He played in 11 games exclusively on special teams, recording eight tackles and had a fumble recovery. On December 26, Blount was placed on season–ending injured reserve after suffering a knee injury in Week 16 against the Kansas City Chiefs.

On August 29, 2023, Blount was waived by the Seahawks.

=== Arizona Cardinals ===
On September 18, 2023, Blount was signed to the practice squad of the Arizona Cardinals. He was promoted to the active roster on October 3. In Week 17 against the Philadelphia Eagles, Blount recorded a game–ending interception against Jalen Hurts to seal the 35–31 victory.

On March 7, 2025, Blount signed a two-year extension with the Cardinals. He was named the special teams captain for the 2025 season. However he suffered a neck injury in Week 1 and was placed on injured reserve on September 10.

Blount was placed on injured reserve on August 8, 2026.
