= 2019 Wake Forest Demon Deacons football team =

American college football season

2019 Wake Forest Demon Deacons football

Pinstripe Bowl, L 21–27 vs. Michigan State
- Conference: Atlantic Coast Conference
- Atlantic Division
- Record: 8–5 (4–4 ACC)
- Head coach: Dave Clawson (6th season)
- Offensive coordinator: Warren Ruggiero (6th season)
- Offensive scheme: Slow mesh
- Defensive coordinator: Lyle Hemphill (1st season)
- Base defense: 4–3
- Captains: Essang Bassey; Cade Carney; Jack Freudenthal; Justin Herron; Justin Strnad
- Home stadium: BB&T Field

Uniform
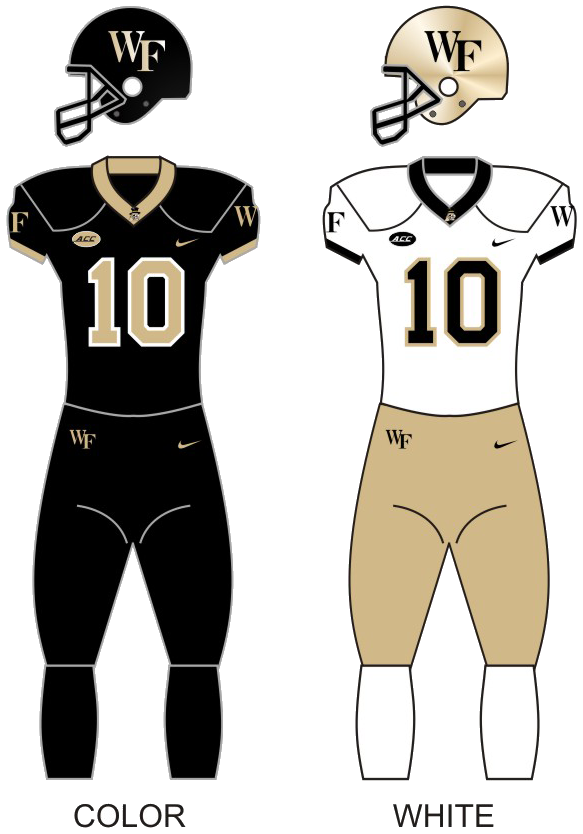

2019 Atlantic Coast Conference football standings
	Conf.			Overall
Team	W		L	W		L
Atlantic Division
No. 2 Clemson xy$^	8	–	0	14	–	1
Louisville	5	–	3	8	–	5
Wake Forest	4	–	4	8	–	5
Boston College	4	–	4	6	–	7
Florida State	4	–	4	6	–	7
Syracuse	2	–	6	5	–	7
NC State	1	–	7	4	–	8
Coastal Division
Virginia x	6	–	2	9	–	5
Virginia Tech	5	–	3	8	–	5
Pittsburgh	4	–	4	8	–	5
North Carolina	4	–	4	7	–	6
Miami (FL)	4	–	4	6	–	7
Duke	3	–	5	5	–	7
Georgia Tech	2	–	6	3	–	9
Championship: Clemson 62, Virginia 17
^ – College Football Playoff participant; $ – Conference champion; x – Division champion/co-champions; Rankings from AP Poll

The 2019 Wake Forest Demon Deacons football team represented Wake Forest University during the 2019 NCAA Division I FBS football season. The team was led by sixth-year head coach Dave Clawson, and played their home games at BB&T Field in Winston-Salem, North Carolina. They competed in the Atlantic Division of the Atlantic Coast Conference.

== Preseason ==
=== Preseason media poll ===
In the preseason ACC media poll, Wake Forest was predicted to finish in sixth in the Atlantic Division.

== Schedule ==
Wake Forest's 2019 schedule began with four non-conference games: at home against Utah State of the Mountain West Conference, on the road against Rice of Conference USA, at home against North Carolina, and at home against Elon of the Colonial Athletic Association. The game against North Carolina, a fellow member of the Atlantic Coast Conference, was played as a non-conference game and therefore did not count in the league standings. This was done because the two rivals otherwise only play once every six years due to the current ACC divisional alignment.

In ACC play, Wake Forest played the other members of the Atlantic Division, as well as Virginia Tech and Duke from the Coastal Division.

Date	Time	Opponent	Rank	Site	TV	Result	Attendance
August 30	8:00 p.m.	Utah State*		BB&T Field; Winston-Salem, NC	ACCN	W 38–35	29,027
September 6	8:00 p.m.	at Rice*		Rice Stadium; Houston, TX	CBSSN	W 41–21	17,567
September 13	6:00 p.m.	North Carolina*		BB&T Field; Winston-Salem, NC (rivalry)	ESPN	W 24–18	31,345
September 21	12:00 p.m.	No. 22 (FCS) Elon*^{†}		BB&T Field; Winston-Salem, NC	ACCRSN	W 49–7	24,079
September 28	3:30 p.m.	at Boston College		Alumni Stadium; Chestnut Hill, MA	ACCN	W 27–24	39,352
October 12	7:30 p.m.	Louisville	No. 19	BB&T Field; Winston-Salem, NC	ACCN	L 59–62	24,434
October 19	7:30 p.m.	Florida State		BB&T Field; Winston-Salem, NC	ACCN	W 22–20	24,782
November 2	12:00 p.m.	NC State	No. 23	BB&T Field; Winston-Salem, NC (rivalry)	ESPN	W 44–10	31,119
November 9	3:30 p.m.	at Virginia Tech	No. 19	Lane Stadium; Blacksburg, VA	ACCN	L 17–36	65,632
November 16	3:30 p.m.	at No. 3 Clemson		Memorial Stadium; Clemson, SC	ABC	L 3–52	80,875
November 23	7:30 p.m.	Duke		BB&T Field; Winston-Salem, NC (rivalry)	ACCN	W 39–27	24,130
November 30	12:30 p.m.	at Syracuse		Carrier Dome; Syracuse, NY	ACCRSN	L 30–39 ^{OT}	33,719
December 27	3:20 p.m.	vs. Michigan State*		Yankee Stadium; Bronx, NY (Pinstripe Bowl)	ESPN	L 21–27	36,895
*Non-conference game; ^{†}Homecoming; Rankings from AP Poll and CFP Rankings after November 5 released prior to game; All times are in Eastern time

== Game summaries ==
=== Utah State ===
	1	2	3	4	Total
Aggies	7	14	7	7	35
Demon Deacons	10	7	14	7	38

=== At Rice ===
	1	2	3	4	Total
Demon Deacons	14	10	10	7	41
Owls	14	0	0	7	21

=== North Carolina ===
	1	2	3	4	Total
Tar Heels	0	0	3	15	18
Demon Deacons	7	14	0	3	24

=== Elon ===
	1	2	3	4	Total
No. 22 (FCS) Phoenix	7	0	0	0	7
Demon Deacons	14	14	14	7	49

=== At Boston College ===
	1	2	3	4	Total
Demon Deacons	10	7	3	7	27
Eagles	0	17	0	7	24

=== Louisville ===
	1	2	3	4	Total
Cardinals	21	10	14	17	62
No. 19 Demon Deacons	7	14	10	28	59

=== Florida State ===
	1	2	3	4	Total
Seminoles	0	14	0	6	20
Demon Deacons	6	6	0	10	22

=== NC State ===
	1	2	3	4	Total
Wolfpack	0	10	0	0	10
No. 23 Demon Deacons	21	13	10	0	44

=== At Virginia Tech ===
	1	2	3	4	Total
No. 22 Demon Deacons	3	7	7	0	17
Hokies	3	3	17	13	36

=== At Clemson ===
	1	2	3	4	Total
Demon Deacons	3	0	0	0	3
No. 3 Tigers	14	17	14	7	52

=== Duke ===
	1	2	3	4	Total
Blue Devils	7	3	3	14	27
Demon Deacons	3	10	10	16	39

=== At Syracuse ===
	1	2	3	4	OT	Total
Demon Deacons	3	3	14	10	0	30
Orange	10	7	3	10	9	39

=== vs Michigan State (Pinstripe Bowl) ===
	1	2	3	4	Total
Spartans	10	10	7	0	27
Demon Deacons	7	14	0	0	21

== Personnel ==
=== Coaching staff ===
Position	Name	First Year at Wake
Head coach	Dave Clawson	2014
Offensive coordinator / quarterbacks	Warren Ruggiero	2014
Defensive coordinator / Safeties	Lyle Hemphill	2017
Asst head coach / Receivers	Kevin Higgins	2014
Special teams coordinator / tight ends	Wayne Lineburg	2017
Defensive Line	Dave Cohen	2014
Running backs	John Hunter	2014
Offensive Line	Nick Tabacca	2014
Outside Linebackers	Brad Sherrod	2017
Cornerbacks	Ryan Crawford	2018
Inside Linebackers	Tyler Santucci	2019

=== Roster ===
2019 Wake Forest Demon Deacons football team roster
Quarterbacks: 10 Sam Hartman – sophomore (6'1, 200); 12 Jamie Newman – junior (6'4, 230) (redshirt); 13 Tayvon Bowers – sophomore (6'1, 200) (redshirt); 15 Michael Kern – freshman (6'2, 175); 17 Leo Kelly – freshman (6'3, 235); Running backs: 25 Kenneth Walker III – freshman (5'10, 200); 26 Christian Beal–Smith – sophomore (5'10, 190) (redshirt); 27 Kentrell Flowers – freshman (6'0, 205); 28 Courtney McKinney – freshman (6'1, 215) (redshirt); 29 DeAndre' Delaney – junior (6'3, 205) (redshirt); 34 Will Drawdy – sophomore (6'0, 200) (redshirt); 36 Cade Carney – senior (5'11, 215); Wide receivers: 2 Kendall Hinton – senior (6'0, 195) (redshirt); 5 Steven Claude – junior (6'2, 200) (redshirt); 7 Scotty Washington – senior (6'5, 225) (redshirt); 11 Davis Johnson – junior (5'11, 180) (redshirt); 14 Sage Surratt – sophomore (6'3, 215) (redshirt); 21 Isaiah Isaac – freshman (5'10, 175) (redshirt); 22 Nolan Groulx – freshman (6'0, 190); 24 Donavon Greene – freshman (6'2, 200); 32 Jarrett Brown – freshman (6'0, 150); 35 JD Kavel – freshman (6'2, 200); 80 Waydale Jones – sophomore (6'4, 200) (redshirt); 81 Ian Driscoll – sophomore (5'10, 170) (redshirt); 82 Jaquarii Roberson – sophomore (6'1, 180) (redshirt); 83 Taylor Morin – freshman (5'10, 175); 87 Teddy Centofanti – freshman (5'11, 180) (redshirt); 88 Andy Elkins Jr. – freshman (6'1, 195); 89 A. T. Perry – freshman (6'5, 190) (redshirt); Tight ends: 20 Cameron Hite – freshman (6'3, 235); 23 Brandon Chapman – junior (6'5, 255) (redshirt); 40 Connor Hebbeler – sophomore (6'2, 245) (redshirt); 48 Jack Connelly – freshman (6'6, 215); 49 Alec Rowan – freshman (6'3, 215) (redshirt); 84 Drelyn Ford – freshman (6'3, 215); 85 Blake Whiteheart – freshman (6'4, 240) (redshirt); 86 Jack Freudenthal – senior (6'3, 235) (redshirt); Punters: 8 Dom Maggio – senior (6'3, 190)	Offensive lineman: 50 Zach Tom – sophomore (6'4, 290) (redshirt); 53 Je'Vionte' Nash – junior (6'3, 295) (redshirt); 55 Michael Jurgens – freshman (6'4, 290) (redshirt); 56 Spencer Clapp – sophomore (6'6, 290) (redshirt); 58 Tyler Watson – junior (6'5, 280) (redshirt); 59 Loic Ngassam Nya – sophomore (6'3, 300) (redshirt); 60 Taleni Suhren – junior (6'5, 285) (redshirt); 62 DeVonte Gordon – freshman (6'5, 295); 66 Goran Jovanovic – sophomore (6'4, 295) (redshirt); 67 Trey Turner – freshman (6'3, 265) (redshirt); 70 CJ Elmonus – freshman (6'7, 285); 71 Nathan Gilliam – senior (6'5, 300) (redshirt); 73 Jake Benzinger – senior (6'7, 295) (redshirt); 75 Justin Herron – (redshirt) Graduate (6'5, 290); 76 Allan Rappleyea – sophomore (6'5, 285) (redshirt); 77 Mike Edwards – freshman (6'6, 330) (redshirt); 78 Orlando Heggs II – freshman (6'3, 295) (redshirt); 79 Sean Maginn – freshman (6'3, 290) (redshirt); Defensive lineman: 9 Carlos Basham Jr. – junior (6'5, 275) (redshirt); 13 Manny Walker – junior (6'4, 250) (redshirt); 15 Shamar McCollum – freshman (6'4, 235); 40 Rondell Bothroyd – freshman (6'4, 280) (redshirt); 41 JaCorey Johns – freshman (6'4, 235) (redshirt); 44 Justin Williams – freshman (6'2, 275); 51 Will Smart – freshman (6'4, 260); 72 Tyler Williams – sophomore (6'1, 290) (redshirt); 90 Sulaiman Kamara – junior (6'2, 290) (redshirt); 91 Mike Allen – sophomore (6'5, 275) (redshirt); 92 Adam Winter – sophomore (6'3, 260) (redshirt); 93 Isaiah Chaney – freshman (6'4, 255); 95 Dion Bergan Jr. – sophomore (6'1, 290); 97 Royce Francis – freshman (6'3, 260) (redshirt); 99 Tyric Swennie – freshman (6'0, 265) (redshirt); Placekickers: 4 Nick Sciba – sophomore (5'9, 190); 8 Dom Maggio – senior (6'3, 190); 88 Zach Murphy – sophomore (6'0, 185) (redshirt); 94 Tony Benich – freshman (5'8, 155); 96 Ivan Mora – freshman (6'0, 170); 98 Cameron Lischke – freshman (6'0, 185) (redshirt)	Linebackers: 23 Justin Strnad – senior (6'3, 235) (redshirt); 30 Ja'Cquez Williams – junior (6'2, 220) (redshirt); 32 Jeff Burley – sophomore (6'2, 230) (redshirt); 34 Zach Ranson – freshman (6'2, 205); 45 Ryan Smenda Jr. – sophomore (6'2, 235); 46 DJ Taylor – junior (6'1, 235); 48 Chase Jones – freshman (6'1, 225); 50 Jack Rielly – sophomore (5'10, 195) (redshirt); 54 Jaylen Hudson – freshman (6'3, 230); 58 Chase Monroe – sophomore (6'2, 225) (redshirt); Defensive backs: 3 Nasir Greer – sophomore (6'0, 200); 4 Amari Henderson – senior (6'1, 180) (redshirt); 6 Ja'Sir Taylor – junior (5'10, 190); 10 Kenneth Dicks III – sophomore (6'0, 200); 12 Luke Masterson – junior (6'2, 220) (redshirt); 17 Traveon Redd – junior (6'0, 195) (redshirt); 18 Trey Rucker – freshman (6'1, 195); 20 Coby Davis – sophomore (5'11, 200) (redshirt); 21 Essang Bassey – senior (5'10, 190); 23 AJ Williams – freshman (5'11, 185); 25 Marquis Alston Jr. – freshman (6'0, 200) (redshirt); 26 Justin Bartee – junior (5'10, 205) (redshirt); 27 Tyriq Hardimon – sophomore (6'0, 195) (redshirt); 28 Zion Keith – freshman (6'1, 180) (redshirt); 36 Jarrett Alston Jr. – freshman (5'8, 170); 37 Isaiah Essissima – freshman (5'10, 185); 38 Peyton Woulard – freshman (6'1, 190) (redshirt); 39 Keegan Good – junior (6'0, 200) (redshirt); 42 Joey Ray – freshman (5'9, 195) (redshirt); 43 Anthony D'Angelo – freshman (5'6, 185) (redshirt); Long snappers: 52 Dayton Diemel – senior (5'10, 230); 61 Noah Turner – freshman (6'0, 225) (redshirt)

== Rankings ==
Ranking movements Legend: ██ Increase in ranking ██ Decrease in ranking — = Not ranked RV = Received votes
	Week																
Poll	Pre	1	2	3	4	5	6	7	8	9	10	11	12	13	14	15	Final
AP	—	—	—	RV	RV	22	19	RV	25	23	22	RV	—	—	—		
Coaches	—	—	RV	RV	24	20	17	RV	23	22	20	RV	RV	RV	—		
CFP	Not released										19	—	—	—			Not released

== Players drafted into the NFL ==
Round	Pick	Player	Position	NFL Club
5	178	Justin Strnad	OLB	Denver Broncos
6	195	Justin Herron	OT	New England Patriots
