= 2019 Syracuse Orange football team =

American college football season

2019 Syracuse Orange football
- Conference: Atlantic Coast Conference
- Atlantic Division
- Record: 5–7 (2–6 ACC)
- Head coach: Dino Babers (4th season)
- Offensive coordinator: Mike Lynch (2nd season)
- Offensive scheme: Veer and shoot
- Defensive coordinator: Brian Ward (4th season; first nine games); Steve Stanard (interim; final three games)
- Base defense: Multiple
- Home stadium: Carrier Dome

Uniform
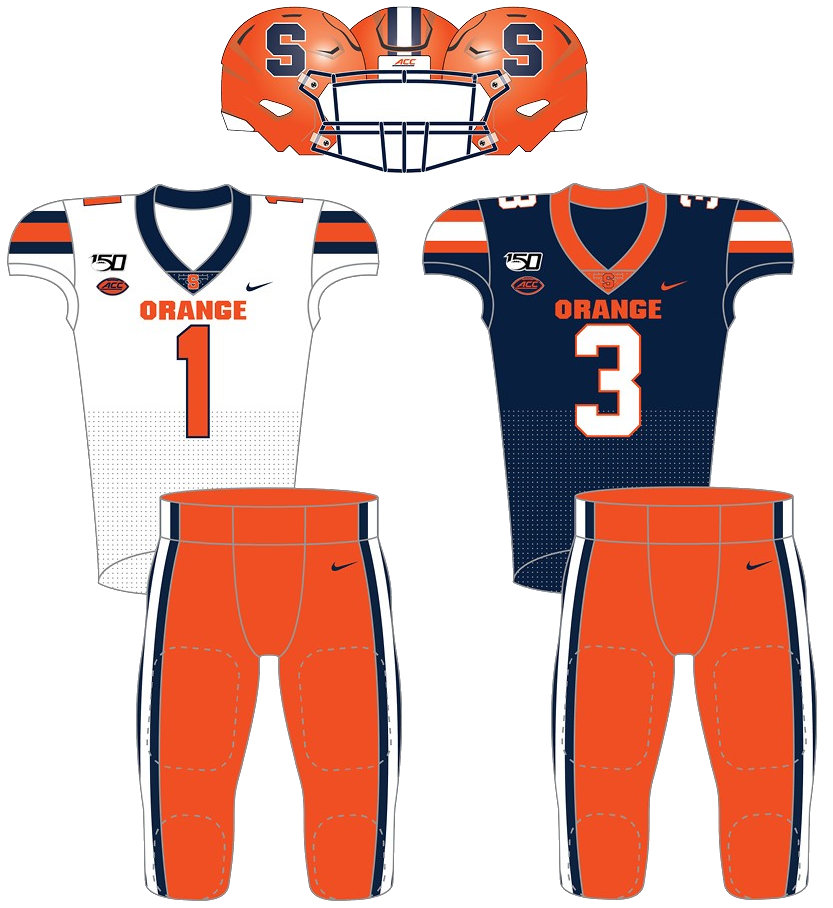

2019 Atlantic Coast Conference football standings
	Conf.			Overall
Team	W		L	W		L
Atlantic Division
No. 2 Clemson xy$^	8	–	0	14	–	1
Louisville	5	–	3	8	–	5
Wake Forest	4	–	4	8	–	5
Boston College	4	–	4	6	–	7
Florida State	4	–	4	6	–	7
Syracuse	2	–	6	5	–	7
NC State	1	–	7	4	–	8
Coastal Division
Virginia x	6	–	2	9	–	5
Virginia Tech	5	–	3	8	–	5
Pittsburgh	4	–	4	8	–	5
North Carolina	4	–	4	7	–	6
Miami (FL)	4	–	4	6	–	7
Duke	3	–	5	5	–	7
Georgia Tech	2	–	6	3	–	9
Championship: Clemson 62, Virginia 17
^ – College Football Playoff participant; $ – Conference champion; x – Division champion/co-champions; Rankings from AP Poll

The 2019 Syracuse Orange football team represented Syracuse University during the 2019 NCAA Division I FBS football season. The Orange were led by fourth-year head coach Dino Babers and played their home games at the Carrier Dome, competing as members of the Atlantic Division of the Atlantic Coast Conference. They finished the season 5–7, 2–6 in ACC play to finish in sixth place in the Atlantic Division.

== Offseason ==
=== Offseason departures ===
==== NFL draftees ====
Player	Round	Pick	Team	Position
Chris Slayton	7	245	New York Giants	DT

==== Undrafted free agents ====
Player	Team	Position	Ref
Cody Conway	Tennessee Titans	OT	
Jamal Custis	Kansas City Chiefs	WR	
Eric Dungey	New York Giants	QB	
Koda Martin	Los Angeles Chargers	OT	

=== Recruiting ===
Syracuse's 2019 recruiting class consisted of 21 signees. The class was ranked as the 10th best class in the ACC and the 55th best class overall according to the 247Sports Composite.

College recruiting (2019)
Name	Hometown	School	Height	Weight	Commit date
Luke Benson; TE	Doylestown, PA	Central Bucks High School West	6 ft 4 in (1.93 m)	220 lb (100 kg)	Jun 24, 2018
Luke Benson; TE	Recruit ratings: Rivals: 247Sports: ESPN: (72)				
Matthew Bergeron; OT	Quebec City, QC	Cégep Garneau	6 ft 5 in (1.96 m)	280 lb (130 kg)	Jul 9, 2018
Matthew Bergeron; OT	Recruit ratings: Rivals: 247Sports: ESPN: (78)				
Geoff Cantin; OLB	Quebec City, QC	Cégep Garneau	6 ft 4 in (1.93 m)	220 lb (100 kg)	Jun 22, 2018
Geoff Cantin; OLB	Recruit ratings: Rivals: 247Sports: ESPN: (78)				
Adrian Cole; CB	Fort Lauderdale, FL	Plantation High School	5 ft 10 in (1.78 m)	156 lb (71 kg)	Jun 23, 2018
Adrian Cole; CB	Recruit ratings: Rivals: 247Sports: ESPN: (72)				
Cooper Dawson; OT	Charleston, SC	Hanahan High School	6 ft 5 in (1.96 m)	250 lb (110 kg)	Dec 19, 2018
Cooper Dawson; OT	Recruit ratings: Rivals: 247Sports: ESPN: (77)				
Ishmael Goulbourne; DE	Palm Beach Gardens, FL	Dwyer High School	6 ft 3 in (1.91 m)	195 lb (88 kg)	Aug 1, 2018
Ishmael Goulbourne; DE	Recruit ratings: Rivals: 247Sports: ESPN: (72)				
Aman Greenwood; S	Washington, D.C.	St. John's College High School	6 ft 0 in (1.83 m)	180 lb (82 kg)	Nov 28, 2018
Aman Greenwood; S	Recruit ratings: Rivals: 247Sports: ESPN: (76)				
Courtney Jackson; WR	Monroeville, PA	Gateway High School	5 ft 11 in (1.80 m)	160 lb (73 kg)	Apr 27, 2018
Courtney Jackson; WR	Recruit ratings: Rivals: 247Sports: ESPN: (79)				
Garrison Johnson; RB	Manvel, TX	Manvel High School	5 ft 11 in (1.80 m)	210 lb (95 kg)	Feb 6, 2019
Garrison Johnson; RB	Recruit ratings: Rivals: 247Sports: ESPN: (75)				
Mikel Jones; OLB	Bradenton, FL	IMG Academy	6 ft 2 in (1.88 m)	208 lb (94 kg)	Nov 21, 2018
Mikel Jones; OLB	Recruit ratings: Rivals: 247Sports: ESPN: (80)				
Lee Kpogba; OLB	Winston-Salem, North Carolina	Parkland Magnet High School	6 ft 2 in (1.88 m)	210 lb (95 kg)	Nov 20, 2018
Lee Kpogba; OLB	Recruit ratings: Rivals: 247Sports: ESPN: (76)				
Steven Linton; DE	Dublin, GA	Dublin High School	6 ft 5 in (1.96 m)	215 lb (98 kg)	Feb 6, 2019
Steven Linton; DE	Recruit ratings: Rivals: 247Sports: ESPN: (74)				
Jason Munoz; DE	Fort Lauderdale, FL	St. Thomas Aquinas High School	6 ft 4 in (1.93 m)	235 lb (107 kg)	Jan 28, 2019
Jason Munoz; DE	Recruit ratings: Rivals: 247Sports: ESPN: (77)				
Cornelius Nunn; S	Miami, FL	Miami Palmetto High School	6 ft 0 in (1.83 m)	170 lb (77 kg)	Nov 21, 2018
Cornelius Nunn; S	Recruit ratings: Rivals: 247Sports: ESPN: (77)				
Anthony Red Jr. OG	Oakdale, CT	St. Thomas More School	6 ft 4 in (1.93 m)	275 lb (125 kg)	Jun 17, 2018
Anthony Red Jr. OG	Recruit ratings: Rivals: 247Sports: ESPN: (74)				
Joe Rondi; DT	Wayne, NJ	Wayne Valley High School	6 ft 4 in (1.93 m)	250 lb (110 kg)	Jun 13, 2018
Joe Rondi; DT	Recruit ratings: Rivals: 247Sports: ESPN: (74)				
David Summers; QB	Trumbull, CT	St. Joseph High School	6 ft 3 in (1.91 m)	205 lb (93 kg)	Jan 27, 2019
David Summers; QB	Recruit ratings: Rivals: 247Sports: ESPN: (79)				
Darius Tisdale; OT	Scranton, PA	Lackawanna College	6 ft 5 in (1.96 m)	295 lb (134 kg)	Dec 8, 2018
Darius Tisdale; OT	Recruit ratings: Rivals: 247Sports: ESPN: (78)				
Andrew Tuazama; DE	Matthews, NC	Jireh Prep	6 ft 6 in (1.98 m)	235 lb (107 kg)	Dec 15, 2018
Andrew Tuazama; DE	Recruit ratings: Rivals: 247Sports: ESPN: (75)				
Garrett Williams; CB	Harrisburg, NC	Hickory Ridge High School	5 ft 10 in (1.78 m)	171 lb (78 kg)	Aug 1, 2018
Garrett Williams; CB	Recruit ratings: Rivals: 247Sports: ESPN: (74)				
Overall recruit ranking: Rivals: 54 247Sports: 55 ESPN: 58
Note: In many cases, Scout, Rivals, 247Sports, On3, and ESPN may conflict in their listings of height and weight.; In these cases, the average was taken. ESPN grades are on a 100-point scale.; Sources: "Rivals commits". Rivals.; "ESPN commits". ESPN.; "2019 Team Ranking". Rivals.com.; "247Sports commits". 247Sports.

== Preseason ==
=== Award watch lists ===
Listed in the order that they were released

Award	Player	Position	Year
Lott Trophy	Andre Cisco	S	So.
Chuck Bednarik Award	Andre Cisco	S	So.
Chuck Bednarik Award	Alton Robinson	DE	Sr.
Doak Walker Award	Moe Neal	RB	Sr.
Biletnikoff Award	Sean Riley	WR	Sr.
Rimington Trophy	Airon Servais	OL	(redshirt) Jr.

=== Preseason media poll ===
In the preseason ACC media poll, Syracuse was predicted to finish in second in the Atlantic Division, and received the second-most votes to win the conference championship game (although Clemson received 170 of 173 total votes).

== Schedule ==
Date	Time	Opponent	Rank	Site	TV	Result	Attendance
August 31	6:00 p.m.	at Liberty*	No. 22	Williams Stadium; Lynchburg, VA	ESPN+	W 24–0	21,671
September 7	12:00 p.m.	at Maryland*	No. 21	Maryland Stadium; College Park, MD	ESPN	L 20–63	33,493
September 14	7:30 p.m.	No. 1 Clemson^{†}		Carrier Dome; Syracuse, NY	ABC	L 6–41	50,249
September 21	12:00 p.m.	Western Michigan*		Carrier Dome; Syracuse, NY	ACCN	W 52–33	40,700
September 28	12:00 p.m.	Holy Cross*		Carrier Dome; Syracuse, NY	ACCN	W 41–3	40,575
October 10	8:00 p.m.	at NC State		Carter–Finley Stadium; Raleigh, NC	ESPN	L 10–16	55,860
October 18	7:00 p.m.	Pittsburgh		Carrier Dome; Syracuse, NY (rivalry)	ESPN	L 20–27	44,886
October 26	3:30 p.m.	at Florida State		Doak Campbell Stadium; Tallahassee, FL	ESPN2	L 17–35	50,517
November 2	12:00 p.m.	Boston College		Carrier Dome; Syracuse, NY	ACCN	L 27–58	42,857
November 16	4:00 p.m.	at Duke		Wallace Wade Stadium; Durham, NC	ACCN	W 49–6	16,286
November 23	4:00 p.m.	at Louisville		Cardinal Stadium; Louisville, KY	ACCN	L 34–56	46,769
November 30	12:30 p.m.	Wake Forest		Carrier Dome; Syracuse, NY	ACCRSN	W 39–30 ^{OT}	33,719
*Non-conference game; ^{†}Homecoming; Rankings from AP Poll and CFP Rankings after November 5 released prior to game; All times are in Eastern time

== Rankings ==
Ranking movements Legend: ██ Increase in ranking ██ Decrease in ranking — = Not ranked RV = Received votes
	Week																
Poll	Pre	1	2	3	4	5	6	7	8	9	10	11	12	13	14	15	Final
AP	22	21	RV	—	—	—	—	—	—	—	—	—	—	—	—	—	
Coaches	22	22	—	—	—	—	—	—	—	—	—	—	—	—	—	—	
CFP	Not released										—	—	—	—	—	—	Not released

== Game summaries ==
=== At Liberty ===
	1	2	3	4	Total
No. 22 Orange	3	7	7	7	24
Flames	0	0	0	0	0

=== At Maryland ===
	1	2	3	4	Total
No. 21 Orange	7	6	7	0	20
Terrapins	21	21	7	14	63

=== Clemson ===
	1	2	3	4	Total
No. 1 Tigers	14	3	10	14	41
Orange	0	6	0	0	6

=== Western Michigan ===
	1	2	3	4	Total
Broncos	0	13	20	0	33
Orange	14	10	14	14	52

=== Holy Cross ===
	1	2	3	4	Total
Crusaders	0	3	0	0	3
Orange	17	7	10	7	41

=== At NC State ===
	1	2	3	4	Total
Orange	0	0	3	7	10
Wolfpack	6	7	3	0	16

=== Pittsburgh ===
	1	2	3	4	Total
Panthers	10	14	0	3	27
Orange	3	3	7	7	20

=== At Florida State ===
	1	2	3	4	Total
Orange	0	3	0	14	17
Seminoles	13	8	14	0	35

=== Boston College ===
	1	2	3	4	Total
Eagles	10	34	7	7	58
Orange	17	3	7	0	27

=== At Duke ===
	1	2	3	4	Total
Orange	14	0	21	14	49
Blue Devils	0	6	0	0	6

=== At Louisville ===
	1	2	3	4	Total
Orange	3	7	17	7	34
Cardinals	21	7	21	7	56

=== Wake Forest ===
	1	2	3	4	OT	Total
Demon Deacons	3	3	14	10	0	30
Orange	10	7	3	10	9	39

== Players drafted into the NFL ==
Round	Pick	Player	Position	NFL Club
5	148	Alton Robinson	DE	Seattle Seahawks
7	228	Sterling Hofrichter	P	Atlanta Falcons
