= Odell Haggins =

American football player and coach (born 1967)

Current position
- Title: Associate head coach
- Team: Florida State
- Conference: ACC

Biographical details
- Born: February 27, 1967 (age 59); Lakeland, Florida, U.S.
- Education: Bartow (FL); Florida State (1993)

Playing career
- 1985–1989: Florida State
- 1990: San Francisco 49ers
- 1991: Buffalo Bills
- Position: Defensive tackle

Coaching career (HC unless noted)
- 1994–1995: Florida State (TE/OL)
- 1996–2018: Florida State (DT)
- 2019: Florida State (AHC/DL)
- 2019: Florida State (interim head coach)
- 2020–2024: Florida State (AHC/DT)
- 2025–present: Florida State (AHC)

Head coaching record
- Overall: 4–2
- Bowls: 1–1

Accomplishments and honors

Awards
- First-team All-American (1989); First Team All South Independent (1988); Second Team All-South Independent (1987)

Odell Haggins Jr. (born February 27, 1967) is an American college football coach and former player. He is the associate head coach and defensive tackles coach for Florida State University, positions he has held since 2020. Haggins has coached at Florida State since 1994 and has served two stints as interim head coach, for the final two games of the 2017 season, following the resignation of Jimbo Fisher, and the final four games of the 2019 season, after the firing of Willie Taggart.

== Career ==
Haggins has been a member of the Florida State Seminoles coaching staff since 1994, with nearly all of his time spent coaching the defensive tackle position. Haggins has also served as associate head coach since 2014, and has twice been named interim head coach. He led the Seminoles for the final two games of the 2017 season and the final four games of the 2019 season (both including bowl games).

A native of Bartow, Florida, Haggins was an All-American defensive lineman for the Seminoles. He played for Florida State from 1985 to 1989 under Bobby Bowden.

Pre-draft measurables
Height	Weight	Arm length	Hand span	40-yard dash	10-yard split	20-yard split	20-yard shuttle	Vertical jump
6 ft 1 3/4 in (1.87 m)	261 lb (118 kg)	33 1/4 in (0.84 m)	9 1/2 in (0.24 m)	4.97 s	1.76 s	2.86 s	4.65 s	28.0 in (0.71 m)

Haggins was selected by the San Francisco 49ers in the ninth round, 248th overall, of the 1990 NFL draft. After three years in the NFL with the 49ers and the Bills, Haggins returned to Florida State as tight ends and offensive line coach under Bowden. He remained on the staff of Bowden's successor, Jimbo Fisher, when he became head coach for the 2010 season. In 2014, Haggins was promoted to associate head coach.

In 2017, Haggins went 2–0 as interim head coach when Fisher resigned, leading the Seminoles into bowl eligibility with a win in their final regular-season game, followed by a 42–13 win over Southern Miss in the 2017 Independence Bowl.

Haggins was again retained by new coach Willie Taggart when he was hired for the 2018 season. When Taggart was fired midway through the 2019 season, Haggins was again named interim coach for the final 3 regular season games; the team went 2–1 during that stretch, bringing its overall season record to 6–6 and again reaching a bowl game.

In December 2019, new FSU head coach Mike Norvell announced Haggins would be the first assistant coach hired to join his staff. The 2023 season is his 30th as an assistant coach at FSU, making him the longest-tenured assistant coach in the country by a large margin. Norvell is the fourth head coach to employ Haggins on the FSU staff.

In 2018, Haggins was selected for the FSU Athletics Hall of Fame.

== Head coaching record ==
Year	Team	Overall	Conference	Standing	Bowl/playoffs
Florida State Seminoles (Atlantic Coast Conference) (2017)
2017	Florida State	2–0*	0–0*	6th (Atlantic)	W Independence
Florida State Seminoles (Atlantic Coast Conference) (2019)
2019	Florida State	2–2**	1–0**	T–3rd (Atlantic)	L Sun
Florida State:		4–2	1–0		
Total:		4–2			

*Haggins served as interim coach after Jimbo Fisher left for Texas A&M on December 1, 2017.
**Haggins served as interim coach after Willie Taggart was fired on November 3, 2019.
