= 2019 Georgia Tech Yellow Jackets football team =

American college football season

2019 Georgia Tech Yellow Jackets football
- Conference: Atlantic Coast Conference
- Coastal Division
- Record: 3–9 (2–6 ACC)
- Head coach: Geoff Collins (1st season)
- Offensive coordinator: Dave Patenaude (1st season)
- Offensive scheme: Pro spread
- Defensive coordinator: Andrew Thacker (1st season)
- Co-defensive coordinator: Nathan Burton (1st season)
- Base defense: Multiple
- Home stadium: Bobby Dodd Stadium

Uniform
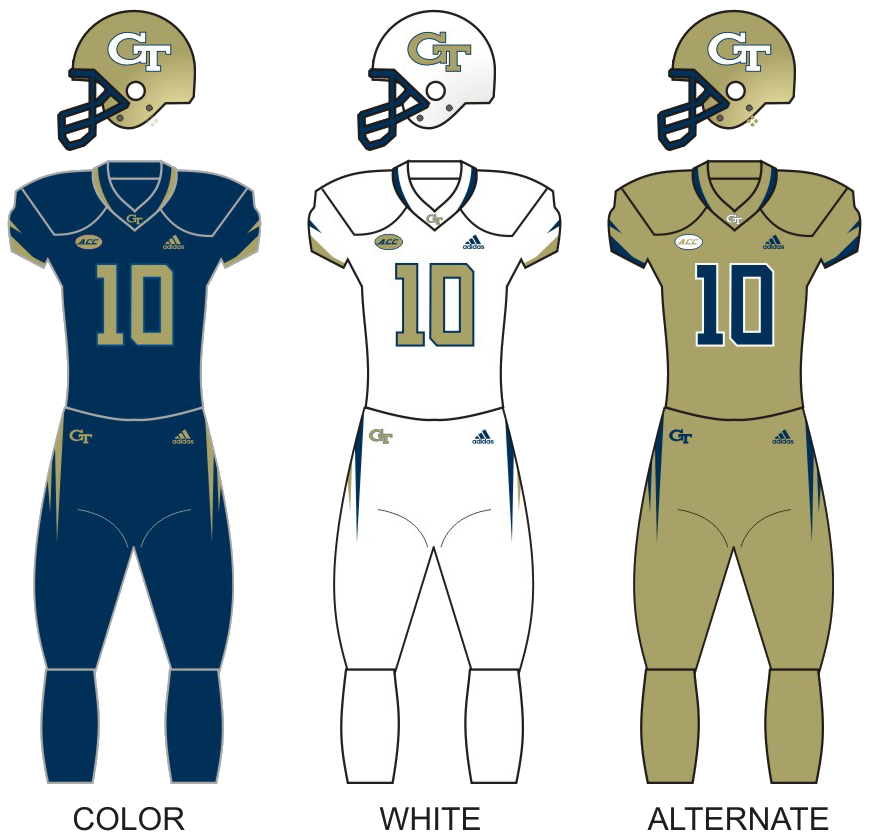

2019 Atlantic Coast Conference football standings
	Conf.			Overall
Team	W		L	W		L
Atlantic Division
No. 2 Clemson xy$^	8	–	0	14	–	1
Louisville	5	–	3	8	–	5
Wake Forest	4	–	4	8	–	5
Boston College	4	–	4	6	–	7
Florida State	4	–	4	6	–	7
Syracuse	2	–	6	5	–	7
NC State	1	–	7	4	–	8
Coastal Division
Virginia x	6	–	2	9	–	5
Virginia Tech	5	–	3	8	–	5
Pittsburgh	4	–	4	8	–	5
North Carolina	4	–	4	7	–	6
Miami (FL)	4	–	4	6	–	7
Duke	3	–	5	5	–	7
Georgia Tech	2	–	6	3	–	9
Championship: Clemson 62, Virginia 17
^ – College Football Playoff participant; $ – Conference champion; x – Division champion/co-champions; Rankings from AP Poll

The 2019 Georgia Tech Yellow Jackets football team represented the Georgia Institute of Technology during the 2019 NCAA Division I FBS football season. The Yellow Jackets were led by head coach Geoff Collins, in his first season. They played their home games at Bobby Dodd Stadium and competed as a member of the Coastal Division of the Atlantic Coast Conference (ACC). They finished the season 3–9, 2–6 in ACC play to finish in last place in the Coastal Division.

== Preseason ==
=== Preseason award watch lists ===
Listed in the order that they were released

Award	Player	Position	Year
Doak Walker Award	Jerry Howard, Jr.	RB	JR
Doak Walker Award	Jordan Mason	RB	SO
John Mackey Award	Tyler Davis	TE	SR
Rimington Trophy	Kenny Cooper	C	SR
Ray Guy Award	Pressley Harvin III	P	JR
Wuerffel Trophy	Jahaziel Lee	DL	SR

=== Preseason media poll ===
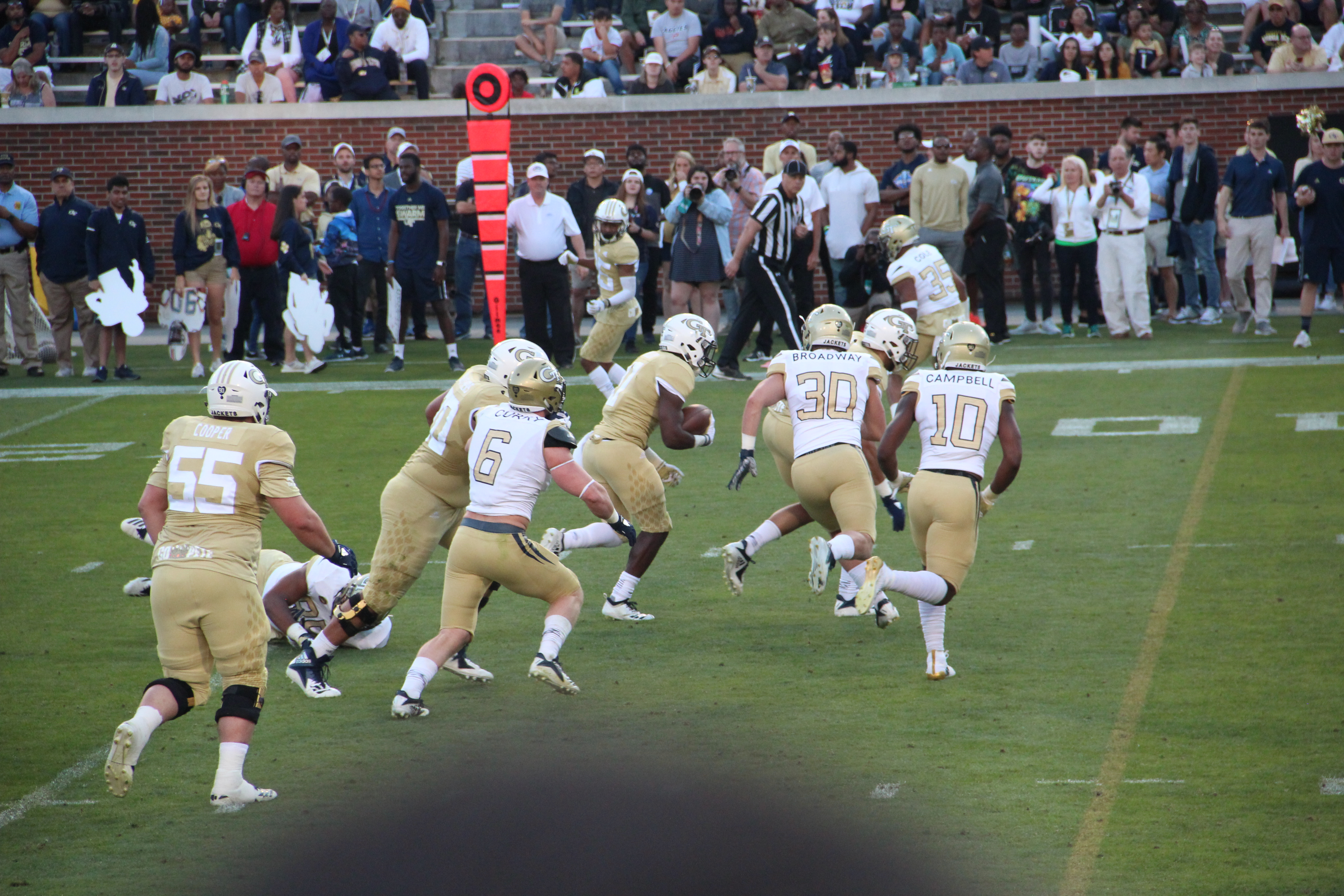
2019 Georgia Tech spring game, white vs. gold

In the preseason ACC media poll, Georgia Tech was predicted to finish last in the Coastal Division.

== Schedule ==
Date	Time	Opponent	Site	TV	Result	Attendance
August 29	8:00 p.m.	at No. 1 Clemson	Memorial Stadium; Clemson, SC (rivalry)	ACCN	L 14–52	79,118
September 7	2:00 p.m.	South Florida*	Bobby Dodd Stadium; Atlanta, GA	ACCN	W 14–10	46,599
September 14	12:30 p.m.	The Citadel*	Bobby Dodd Stadium; Atlanta, GA	ACCRSN	L 24–27 ^{OT}	42,871
September 28	3:30 p.m.	at Temple*	Lincoln Financial Field; Philadelphia, PA	CBSSN	L 2–24	31,094
October 5	4:00 p.m.	North Carolina	Bobby Dodd Stadium; Atlanta, GA	ACCN	L 22–38	45,044
October 12	12:30 p.m.	at Duke	Wallace Wade Stadium; Durham, NC	ACCRSN	L 23–41	21,741
October 19	12:00 p.m.	at Miami (FL)	Hard Rock Stadium; Miami Gardens, FL	ACCN	W 28–21 ^{OT}	54,106
November 2	4:00 p.m.	Pittsburgh^{†}	Bobby Dodd Stadium; Atlanta, GA	ACCRSN	L 10–20	41,219
November 9	12:30 p.m.	at Virginia	Scott Stadium; Charlottesville, VA	ACCRSN	L 28–33	44,596
November 16	3:30 p.m.	Virginia Tech	Bobby Dodd Stadium; Atlanta, GA (rivalry)	ACCRSN	L 0–45	43,263
November 21	8:00 p.m.	NC State	Bobby Dodd Stadium; Atlanta, GA	ESPN	W 28–26	38,198
November 30	12:00 p.m.	No. 4 Georgia*	Bobby Dodd Stadium; Atlanta, GA (Clean, Old-Fashioned Hate)	ABC	L 7–52	55,000
*Non-conference game; ^{†}Homecoming; Rankings from AP Poll and CFP Rankings after November 5 released prior to game; All times are in Eastern time

== Game summaries ==
=== At Clemson ===
	1	2	3	4	Total
Yellow Jackets	0	0	7	7	14
No. 1 Tigers	14	14	14	10	52

A surprisingly positive start for Tech almost immediately turned into a wreck very early in the game. Tech defended Clemson's high-powered offense very well, earning a 3 and out on Clemson's first drive. However, all of Tech's momentum evaporated when the ensuing Clemson punt was fumbled deep in Tech territory. Clemson recovered the fumble and scored, the first 7 of 28 points in the half. Tech was able to find its defensive footing in fits and starts, but big plays broke through for Clemson, including a 90-yard run on a delayed draw by Travis Etienne. Tech's best defensive play of the night would be a 41-yard interception return by Tre Swilling to the 2 yard line, which ultimately led to Tech throwing an interception on 4th & goal. Tech would later score 2 touchdowns in the second half, along with Clemson scoring 24 points to make the final score 52-14 Clemson.

=== South Florida ===
	1	2	3	4	Total
Bulls	3	0	0	7	10
Yellow Jackets	0	14	0	0	14

Georgia Tech secured the win over South Florida by way of USF mistakes, a strong defensive performance, and excellent special teams play. As the GT offense continues to solidify their long term offensive gameplan, they were able to do just enough to outscore the USF offense. Aided by numerous penalties on the USF defense, the Jackets moved the ball mostly via rushing plays while playing with a patchwork offensive line after a rash of injuries at those positions. The defensive penalties and costly fumbles made up the list of USF mistakes, with the biggest miscue being a fumble on the goal line while trying to score the go-ahead touchdown. The Tech defense was able to secure that fumble, all the while limiting USF's production throughout the day. From the many pass breakups to the 9 TFLs, the Jackets defense stifled USF for most of the day. Finally, the performance of Tech's special teams provided a big lift and was a major contributor to the first win of the Geoff Collins Era. Marred only by a widely missed 51-yard field goal attempt and one shanked punt, Tech's special teams was a definite positive on the day. Tech's Pressley Harvin III was able to pin USF consistently within the 15-yard line with 2 of the punt returns resulting in fumbles (one recovered by each team). Kick coverage and returns were executed with little drama and were consistently well-executed. With the win, Tech avoided its first 0–2 start in 30 years.

=== The Citadel ===
	1	2	3	4	OT	Total
Bulldogs	7	7	7	3	3	27
Yellow Jackets	0	6	8	10	0	24

The Citadel, with their triple option style of play, dominated time of possession, clocking in at 41:50 to Tech's 18:10. The Jackets struggled offensively, managing only 301 total yards compared to the Bulldogs' 320 rushing yards.

The loss is a historic one for Georgia Tech. It marks Tech's first loss to an FCS opponent since a 1983 loss to Furman 36 years prior. This is also The Citadel's first win over an ACC opponent, previously going 0–22 against members of the Atlantic Coast Conference, and The Citadel's first win against the Jackets, failing to beat them in the previous 10 matchups.

=== At Temple ===
	1	2	3	4	Total
Yellow Jackets	0	0	2	0	2
Owls	0	14	10	0	24

The meeting is the first between the universities. Coach Geoff Collins was Temple's coach the previous season and left them after allegedly building up their program towards a top tier AAC team.

=== North Carolina ===
	1	2	3	4	Total
Tar Heels	3	14	0	21	38
Yellow Jackets	0	0	7	15	22

Facing off against UNC for the Yellow Jackets home ACC opening, they initially went scoreless in the first half. The Yellow Jackets managed to score 22 points in the second half, but ultimately was not enough to overcome the point deficit. The game marked the first career start for redshirt freshman James Graham, though he shared some early snaps with running QB Tobias Oliver.

=== At Duke ===
	1	2	3	4	Total
Yellow Jackets	7	7	3	6	23
Blue Devils	10	28	3	0	41

=== At Miami (FL) ===
	1	2	3	4	OT	Total
Yellow Jackets	14	7	0	0	7	28
Hurricanes	14	7	0	0	0	21

Three missed field goals by Miami kickers sent the game into overtime which led Georgia Tech to break a 4 game losing streak. As like the last game in Miami played 2 years prior, the game came down to the final play where Miami turned the ball over on downs just a few inches short of the line to gain during the overtime period.

=== Pittsburgh ===
	1	2	3	4	Total
Panthers	10	7	0	3	20
Yellow Jackets	0	7	3	0	10

=== At Virginia ===
	1	2	3	4	Total
Yellow Jackets	14	7	0	7	28
Cavaliers	14	10	0	9	33

=== Virginia Tech ===
	1	2	3	4	Total
Hokies	14	17	14	0	45
Yellow Jackets	0	0	0	0	0

=== NC State ===
	1	2	3	4	Total
Wolfpack	0	3	10	13	26
Yellow Jackets	7	14	7	0	28

=== Georgia ===
	1	2	3	4	Total
No. 4 Bulldogs	17	0	21	14	52
Yellow Jackets	0	7	0	0	7

== Players drafted into the NFL ==
Round	Pick	Player	Position	NFL club
6	206	Tyler Davis	TE	Jacksonville Jaguars
