= 2019 Florida State Seminoles football team =

American college football season

2019 Florida State Seminoles football

Sun Bowl, L 14–20 vs. Arizona State
- Conference: Atlantic Coast Conference
- Atlantic Division
- Record: 6–7 (4–4 ACC)
- Head coach: Willie Taggart (2nd season; first 9 games); Odell Haggins (interim; final 4 games)
- Offensive coordinator: Kendal Briles (1st season)
- Offensive scheme: Hurry-up, no-huddle spread
- Defensive coordinator: Harlon Barnett (2nd season)
- Base defense: Multiple
- Captains: James Blackman; Marvin Wilson; Ricky Aguayo
- Home stadium: Doak Campbell Stadium

Uniform
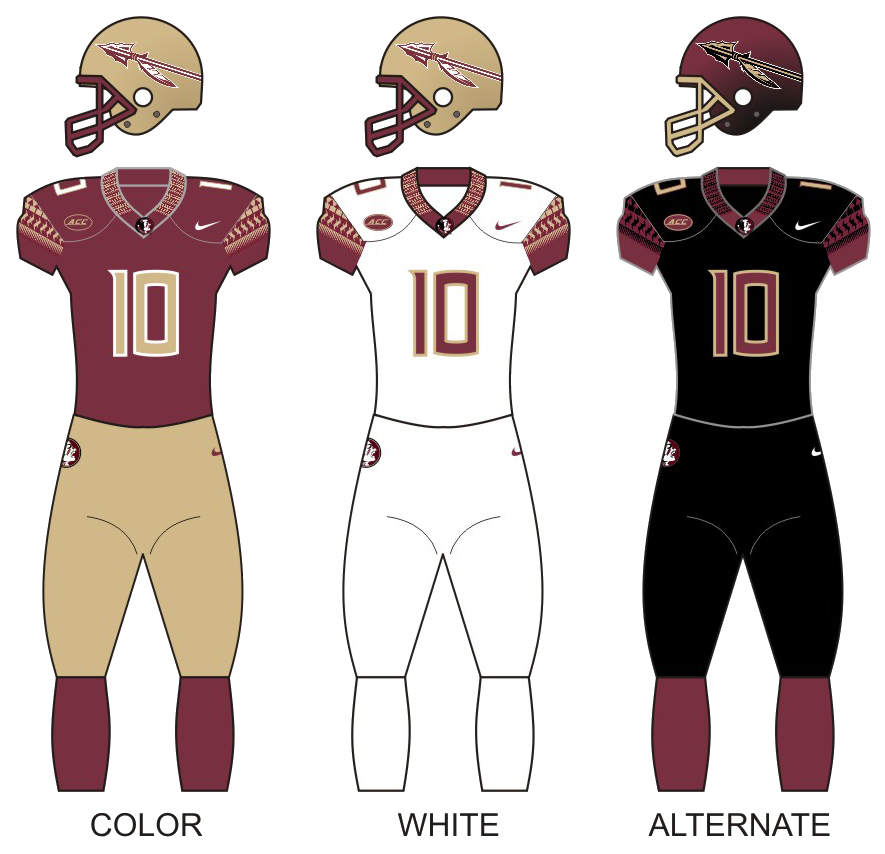

2019 Atlantic Coast Conference football standings
	Conf.			Overall
Team	W		L	W		L
Atlantic Division
No. 2 Clemson xy$^	8	–	0	14	–	1
Louisville	5	–	3	8	–	5
Wake Forest	4	–	4	8	–	5
Boston College	4	–	4	6	–	7
Florida State	4	–	4	6	–	7
Syracuse	2	–	6	5	–	7
NC State	1	–	7	4	–	8
Coastal Division
Virginia x	6	–	2	9	–	5
Virginia Tech	5	–	3	8	–	5
Pittsburgh	4	–	4	8	–	5
North Carolina	4	–	4	7	–	6
Miami (FL)	4	–	4	6	–	7
Duke	3	–	5	5	–	7
Georgia Tech	2	–	6	3	–	9
Championship: Clemson 62, Virginia 17
^ – College Football Playoff participant; $ – Conference champion; x – Division champion/co-champions; Rankings from AP Poll

The 2019 Florida State Seminoles football team represented Florida State University during the 2019 NCAA Division I FBS football season. The Seminoles played their home games at Doak Campbell Stadium in Tallahassee, Florida, and competed as members of the Atlantic Division in the Atlantic Coast Conference.

Florida State was initially led by second-year head coach Willie Taggart. On November 3, 2019, Taggart was fired after losing to Miami (FL) and falling to 4–5 on the season and 9–12 overall. Defensive line coach Odell Haggins was named interim head coach for the remainder of the season, for the second time during his tenure with the program. The Seminoles ultimately finished the season with a 6–7 record, completing consecutive losing seasons for the first time since the 1975 and 1976 seasons. This was the first season since 1976 that Florida State was not ranked in either of the major polls. Running back Cam Akers went on to be selected in the second round of the NFL draft.

== Schedule ==
Florida State's 2019 season was set to begin with a non-conference neutral site game at TIAA Bank Field in Jacksonville, Florida, against Boise State of the Mountain West Conference, though the game was relocated to Tallahassee due to Hurricane Dorian. In ACC play, the Seminoles played the other members of the Atlantic Division as well as Virginia and Miami from the Coastal Division. To end the year, Florida State played on the road against rival Florida of the Southeastern Conference (SEC).

Date	Time	Opponent	Site	TV	Result	Attendance	Source
August 31	12:00 p.m.	Boise State*	Doak Campbell Stadium; Tallahassee, FL (Note: The game against Boise State was originally scheduled for 7:00 p.m. ET at TIAA Bank Stadium in Jacksonville, but was moved over safety concerns related to Hurricane Dorian.)	ESPNews	L 31–36	50,917	
September 7	5:00 p.m.	Louisiana–Monroe*	Doak Campbell Stadium; Tallahassee, FL	ACCN	W 45–44 ^{OT}	52,969	
September 14	7:30 p.m.	at No. 25 Virginia	Scott Stadium; Charlottesville, VA (Jefferson-Eppes Trophy)	ACCN	L 24–31	57,826	
September 21	3:30 p.m.	Louisville	Doak Campbell Stadium; Tallahassee, FL	ESPN	W 35–24	46,530	
September 28	7:30 p.m.	NC State	Doak Campbell Stadium; Tallahassee, FL	ACCN	W 31–13	60,351	
October 12	3:30 p.m.	at No. 2 Clemson	Memorial Stadium; Clemson, SC (rivalry)	ABC	L 14–45	80,500	
October 19	7:30 p.m.	at Wake Forest	BB&T Field; Winston-Salem, NC	ACCN	L 20–22	24,782	
October 26	3:30 p.m.	Syracuse^{†}	Doak Campbell Stadium; Tallahassee, FL	ESPN2	W 35–17	50,517	
November 2	3:30 p.m.	Miami (FL)	Doak Campbell Stadium; Tallahassee, FL (rivalry, Florida Cup)	ABC	L 10–27	63,995	
November 9	12:00 p.m.	at Boston College	Alumni Stadium; Chestnut Hill, MA	ACCN	W 38–31	37,312	
November 16	12:00 p.m.	Alabama State*	Doak Campbell Stadium; Tallahassee, FL	ACCRSN	W 49–12	52,857	
November 30	7:30 p.m.	at No. 8 Florida*	Ben Hill Griffin Stadium; Gainesville, FL (rivalry, Florida Cup)	SECN	L 17–40	89,409	
December 31	2:00 p.m.	vs. Arizona State*	Sun Bowl; El Paso, TX (Sun Bowl)	CBS	L 14–20	42,412	
*Non-conference game; ^{†}Homecoming; Rankings from AP Poll released prior to the game; All times are in Eastern time

== Preseason ==
=== Coaching changes ===
In December 2018, the school hired Kendal Briles to be the new offensive coordinator and quarterbacks coach, replacing Walt Bell, who left to take the head coaching job at UMass. Briles spent the 2018 season as offensive coordinator at Houston. In January 2019, the school hired alum Ron Dugans to coach wide receivers. In February 2019, the school fired offensive line coach Greg Frey and hired Randy Clements to the same position; Briles and Clements previously worked together on the Houston staff.

=== Player news ===
Quarterback Deondre Francois was dismissed from the team in February 2019 after Francois' girlfriend posted a video to Instagram which alleged domestic abuse. Francois had been the starting quarterback for the Seminoles during the 2016 and 2018 seasons (an injury sustained in the first game of 2017 sidelined him for most of that season), and was set to be the starter again as a senior.

In March 2019, former Wisconsin quarterback Alex Hornibrook announced that he was transferring to Florida State for his final season of eligibility as an NCAA graduate transfer. In August 2019, Jordan Travis, a transfer quarterback from Louisville, was granted a waiver by the NCAA to be immediately eligible to play.

=== Recruiting ===
Florida State's 2019 recruiting class consisted of 21 recruits. The class was ranked 21st in the nation and second in the ACC according to the 247Sports.com Composite. This represented the lowest-ranked class for the school since 2007.

=== Spring game ===
The 'Garnet and Gold Game' was held on April 6 with the Gold team, led by James Blackman, victorious over the Garnet team by a score of 27–21.

=== Preseason media poll ===
In the preseason ACC media poll, Florida State was selected to finish third in the Atlantic Division. Wide receiver Tamorrion Terry and defensive tackle Marvin Wilson were named to the preseason All-ACC team.

=== Award watch lists ===
Award	Player	Position	Year
Lott Trophy	DeCalon Brooks	LB	SO
Maxwell Award	Cam Akers	RB	JR
Bednarik Award	Marvin Wilson	DT	JR
Doak Walker Award	Cam Akers	RB	JR
Biletnikoff Award	Tamorrion Terry	WR	SO
Mackey Award	Tre' McKitty	TE	JR
Butkus Award	Dontavious Jackson	LB	SR
Outland Trophy	Marvin Wilson	DT	JR
Bronko Nagurski Trophy	Marvin Wilson	DT	JR
Ray Guy Award	Logan Tyler	P	SR
Wuerffel Trophy	DeCalon Brooks	LB	SO

Listed in the order that they were released

== Game summaries ==
=== Vs. Boise State ===
	1	2	3	4	Total
Broncos	6	13	7	10	36
Seminoles	21	10	0	0	31

=== Louisiana–Monroe ===
	1	2	3	4	OT	Total
Warhawks	0	7	14	17	6	44
Seminoles	14	10	0	14	7	45

=== At Virginia ===
	1	2	3	4	Total
Seminoles	0	14	3	7	24
No. 25 Cavaliers	3	7	0	21	31

=== Louisville ===
	1	2	3	4	Total
Cardinals	0	7	10	7	24
Seminoles	21	0	0	14	35

=== NC State ===
	1	2	3	4	Total
Wolfpack	0	6	0	7	13
Seminoles	3	14	7	7	31

=== At Clemson ===
	1	2	3	4	Total
Seminoles	0	0	7	7	14
No. 2 Tigers	14	14	14	3	45

=== At Wake Forest ===
	1	2	3	4	Total
Seminoles	0	14	0	6	20
Demon Deacons	6	6	0	10	22

=== Syracuse ===
	1	2	3	4	Total
Orange	0	3	0	14	17
Seminoles	13	8	14	0	35

=== Miami (FL) ===
	1	2	3	4	Total
Hurricanes	7	10	0	10	27
Seminoles	0	3	7	0	10

=== At Boston College ===
	1	2	3	4	Total
Seminoles	3	7	14	14	38
Eagles	7	7	0	17	31

=== Alabama State ===
	1	2	3	4	Total
Hornets	3	3	6	0	12
Seminoles	14	7	14	14	49

=== At Florida ===
	1	2	3	4	Total
Seminoles	7	0	10	0	17
No. 8 Gators	7	23	7	3	40

=== Vs. Arizona State (Sun Bowl) ===
	1	2	3	4	Total
Seminoles	0	0	14	0	14
Sun Devils	3	6	0	11	20

== Honors ==
Weekly awards
Player	Award	Week Awarded	Ref.
Cam Akers	ACC Running Back of the Week	Week 2 Week 4 Week 9	
Marvin Wilson	ACC Defensive Lineman of the Week	Week 4	
Alex Hornibrook	ACC Quarterback of the Week	Week 5	
Cyrus Fagan	ACC Defensive Back of the Week	Week 5	
Amari Gainer	ACC Rookie of the Week	Week 5	
Hamsah Nasirildeen	ACC Defensive Back of the Week	Week 9 Week 11; Week 12	
Tamorrion Terry	ACC Receiver of the Week	Week 11	

=== All-ACC ===
The Seminoles had six players selected to the All-ACC team, with four defensive selections and two offensive selections.

- Marvin Wilson (first team)
- Cam Akers (second team)
- Tamorrion Terry (second team)
- Hamsah Nasirildeen (second team)
- Asante Samuel, Jr. (Third Team)
- Stanford Samuels III (Honorable Mention)

== Personnel ==
=== Coaching staff ===
Florida State Seminoles coaches

Head coach

- Willie Taggart (thru 11/2/19)
- Odell Haggins (interim)

Assistant coaches

- Kendal Briles – Offensive coordinator/quarterbacks
- Harlon Barnett – Defensive coordinator/defensive backs
- Randy Clements – Offensive line
- Odell Haggins – Associate head coach/defensive line
- Raymond Woodie – Linebackers
- Telly Lockette – Tight ends
- Ron Dugans – Wide receivers
- Donte' Pimpleton – Running backs
- Mark Snyder – Special Teams
- Irele Oderinde – Strength and conditioning
- George Henshaw – Offensive assistant
- Stanford Samuels Jr. – Defensive assistant
- Jim Leavitt – Quality Control Analyst

== Players drafted into the NFL ==
Round	Pick	Player	Position	NFL Club
2	52	Cam Akers	RB	Los Angeles Rams
