= 2019 ACC Championship Game =

- Conference Championship
| Virginia Cavaliers | Clemson Tigers |
| (9–3) | (12–0) |
| 17 | 62 |
| Head coach: Bronco Mendenhall | Head coach: Dabo Swinney |
| AP / Coaches / CFP; 22 / 22 / 23 | AP / Coaches / CFP; 3 / 3 / 3 |
| | 1 | 2 | 3 | 4 | Total |
|---|---|---|---|---|---|
| Virginia | 7 | 0 | 7 | 3 | 17 |
| Clemson | 14 | 17 | 14 | 17 | 62 |
- Date: December 7, 2019
- Season: 2019
- Stadium: Bank of America Stadium
- Location: Charlotte, North Carolina
- MVP: Tee Higgins (WR, Clemson)
- Favorite: Clemson by 29.5
- Referee: Riley Johnson
- Attendance: 66,810

United States TV coverage
- Network: ABC; ESPN Radio
- Announcers: Steve Levy (play-by-play), Brian Griese (analyst), Todd McShay (sideline) and Maria Taylor (sideline) (ABC)

2019 Atlantic Coast Conference football standings
| | Conf. | | | Overall |
| Team | W | | L | W | | L |
|---|---|---|---|---|---|---|
Atlantic Division
| No. 2 Clemson xy$^ | 8 | – | 0 | 14 | – | 1 |
| Louisville | 5 | – | 3 | 8 | – | 5 |
| Wake Forest | 4 | – | 4 | 8 | – | 5 |
| Boston College | 4 | – | 4 | 6 | – | 7 |
| Florida State | 4 | – | 4 | 6 | – | 7 |
| Syracuse | 2 | – | 6 | 5 | – | 7 |
| NC State | 1 | – | 7 | 4 | – | 8 |
Coastal Division
| Virginia x | 6 | – | 2 | 9 | – | 5 |
| Virginia Tech | 5 | – | 3 | 8 | – | 5 |
| Pittsburgh | 4 | – | 4 | 8 | – | 5 |
| North Carolina | 4 | – | 4 | 7 | – | 6 |
| Miami (FL) | 4 | – | 4 | 6 | – | 7 |
| Duke | 3 | – | 5 | 5 | – | 7 |
| Georgia Tech | 2 | – | 6 | 3 | – | 9 |
Championship: Clemson 62, Virginia 17
^ – College Football Playoff participant; $ – Conference champion; x – Division champion/co-champions; Rankings from AP Poll

The 2019 ACC Championship Game was a college football game played on December 7, 2019. It was the 15th annual ACC Championship Game, played to determine the 2019 champion of the Atlantic Coast Conference football season. The game was held at Bank of America Stadium in Charlotte, North Carolina. The Clemson Tigers defeated the Virginia Cavaliers, 62–17.

== History ==
The 2019 Championship Game was the 15th in the Atlantic Coast Conference's 67-year history. Last season, the ACC Championship Game featured the Clemson Tigers, champions of the Atlantic Division, and the Pitt Panthers, champions of the Coastal Division. This was Pitt's first appearance in the Championship Game, and they were the sixth different school to come out of the Coastal Division in the past six seasons. Clemson won the 2018 game 42–10 for their fourth consecutive ACC title, and went on to win the 2019 College Football Playoff National Championship.

== Teams ==
=== Clemson ===
Clemson clinched the Atlantic division for the fifth consecutive year, and entered the game with an undefeated 12–0 record for the third time in that span. The Tigers entered the title game as the four-time-defending conference champions, and the defending national champions.

=== Virginia ===
Virginia clinched the Coastal division after defeating rival Virginia Tech in the regular season finale to finish the regular season at 9–3 (6–2 ACC). With the win, Virginia snapped a 15-game losing streak to their in-state rival. The Cavaliers made their first appearance in the ACC Championship Game, and also concluded a seven-year stretch in which all seven members of the Coastal division appeared in the title game.

== Game summary ==
2019 ACC Championship Game

| Quarter | 1 | 2 | 3 | 4 | Total |
|---|---|---|---|---|---|
| No. 23 Virginia | 7 | 0 | 7 | 3 | 17 |
| No. 3 Clemson | 14 | 17 | 14 | 17 | 62 |

at Bank of America Stadium • Charlotte, North Carolina

- Date: Saturday, December 7, 2019
- Game time: 7:30 p.m. EST
- Game attendance: 66,810
- Referee: Riley Johnson
- TV announcers (ABC): Steve Levy (play-by-play), Brian Griese (analyst), Todd McShay (sideline) and Maria Taylor (sideline)
- ESPN game summary

Game information

First Quarter

- (11:11) CLEM – Trevor Lawrence 19 yard pass to Tee Higgins, B. T. Potter kick (Drive: 5 plays, 80 yards, 1:34; Clemson 7–0)
- (6:22) UVA – Bryce Perkins 20 yard pass to Hasise Dubois, Brian Delaney kick (Drive: 12 plays, 78 yards, 4:44; Tied 7–7)
- (4:46) CLEM – Trevor Lawrence 59 yard pass to Justyn Ross, B.T. Potter kick (Drive: 4 plays, 75 yards, 1:36; Clemson 14–7)

Second Quarter

- (13:23) CLEM – B.T. Potter 47 yard field goal (Drive: 8 plays, 53 yards, 2:43; Clemson 17–7)
- (9:10) CLEM – Travis Etienne 26 yard rush, B.T. Potter kick (Drive: 4 plays, 68 yards, 1:24; Clemson 24–7)
- (0:49) CLEM – Trevor Lawrence 7 yard pass to Tee Higgins, B.T. Potter kick (Drive: 12 plays, 83 yards, 5:29; Clemson 31–7)

Third Quarter

- (8:21) UVA – Bryce Perkins 8 yard pass to Terrell Jana, Brian Delaney kick (Drive: 10 plays, 85 yards, 5:16; Clemson 31-14)
- (6:12) CLEM – Trevor Lawrence 11 yard pass to Tee Higgins, B.T. Potter kick (Drive: 5 plays, 75 yards, 2:09; Clemson 38–14)
- (1:00) CLEM – Lyn-J Dixon 23 yard rush, B.T. Potter kick (Drive: 6 plays, 49 yards, 2:10; Clemson 45–14)

Fourth Quarter

- (13:11) UVA – Brian Delaney 35 yard field goal (Drive: 9 plays, 58 yards, 2:49; Clemson 45–17)
- (10:45) CLEM – B.T. Potter 24 yard field goal (Drive: 7 plays, 69 yards, 2:26; Clemson 48–17)
- (8:13) CLEM – Chase Brice 4 yard rush, B.T. Potter kick (Drive: 3 plays, 7 yards, 1:04; Clemson 55–17)
- (1:26) CLEM – Chez Mellusi 4 yard rush, B.T. Potter kick (Drive: 9 plays, 59 yards, 4:22; Clemson 62–17)

=== Statistics ===
| Statistics | UVA | CLEM |
|---|---|---|
| First downs | 23 | 28 |
| Plays–yards | 75–387 | 67–619 |
| Rushes–yards | 27–104 | 38–211 |
| Passing yards | 283 | 408 |
| Passing: comp–att–int | 30–48–3 | 21–29–0 |
| Time of possession | 33:14 | 26:46 |

| Team | Category | Player | Statistics |
|---|---|---|---|
| Virginia | Passing | Bryce Perkins | 27/43, 266 yards, 2 TD, 2 INT |
| Virginia | Rushing | Bryce Perkins | 17 carries, 58 yards |
| Virginia | Receiving | Hasise Dubois | 10 receptions, 130 yards, 1 TD |
| Clemson | Passing | Trevor Lawrence | 16/22, 302 yards, 4 TD |
| Clemson | Rushing | Travis Etienne | 14 carries, 114 yards, 1 TD |
| Clemson | Receiving | Tee Higgins | 9 receptions, 182 yards, 3 TD |
