= 2019 Duke Blue Devils football team =

American college football season

2019 Duke Blue Devils football
- Conference: Atlantic Coast Conference
- Coastal Division
- Record: 5–7 (3–5 ACC)
- Head coach: David Cutcliffe (12th season)
- Offensive coordinator: Zac Roper (4th season)
- Offensive scheme: Multiple
- Co-defensive coordinators: Ben Albert (2nd season); Matt Guerrieri (2nd season)
- Base defense: 4–2–5
- MVP: Dylan Singleton
- Captains: Zach Baker; Edgar Cerenord; Quentin Harris; Tre Hornbuckle; Koby Quansah; Dylan Singleton
- Home stadium: Wallace Wade Stadium

Uniform
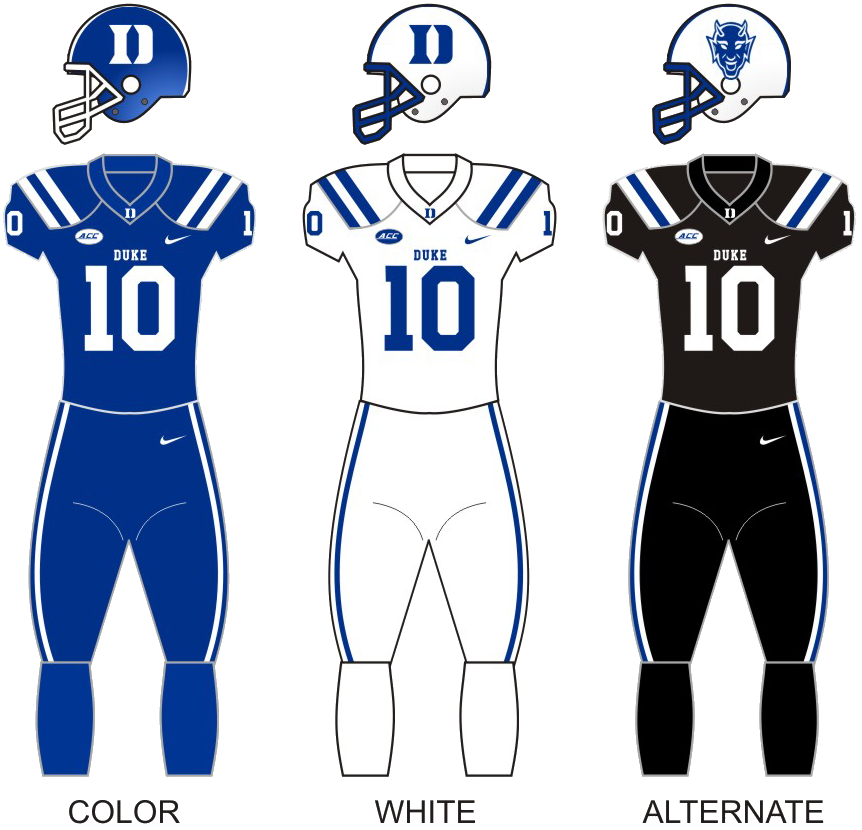

2019 Atlantic Coast Conference football standings
	Conf.			Overall
Team	W		L	W		L
Atlantic Division
No. 2 Clemson xy$^	8	–	0	14	–	1
Louisville	5	–	3	8	–	5
Wake Forest	4	–	4	8	–	5
Boston College	4	–	4	6	–	7
Florida State	4	–	4	6	–	7
Syracuse	2	–	6	5	–	7
NC State	1	–	7	4	–	8
Coastal Division
Virginia x	6	–	2	9	–	5
Virginia Tech	5	–	3	8	–	5
Pittsburgh	4	–	4	8	–	5
North Carolina	4	–	4	7	–	6
Miami (FL)	4	–	4	6	–	7
Duke	3	–	5	5	–	7
Georgia Tech	2	–	6	3	–	9
Championship: Clemson 62, Virginia 17
^ – College Football Playoff participant; $ – Conference champion; x – Division champion/co-champions; Rankings from AP Poll

The 2019 Duke Blue Devils football team represented Duke University in the 2019 NCAA Division I FBS football season s a member of the Atlantic Coast Conference (ACC) in the Coastal Division. The team was led by head coach David Cutcliffe, in his 12th year, and played its home games at Wallace Wade Stadium in Durham, North Carolina. They finished the season 5–7 overall and 3–5 in ACC play to place sixth in the Coastal Division.

== Preseason ==
=== Preseason media poll ===
In the preseason ACC media poll, Duke was predicted to finish in fifth in the Coastal Division.

== Schedule ==
Date	Time	Opponent	Site	TV	Result	Attendance
August 31	3:30 p.m.	vs. No. 2 Alabama*	Mercedes-Benz Stadium; Atlanta, GA (Chick-fil-A Kickoff)	ABC	L 3–42	71,916
September 7	6:00 p.m.	No. 15 (FCS) North Carolina A&T*	Wallace Wade Stadium; Durham, NC	ACCN Extra	W 45–13	38,313
September 14	7:00 p.m.	at Middle Tennessee*	Johnny "Red" Floyd Stadium; Murfreesboro, TN	Stadium Facebook	W 41–18	19,852
September 27	7:00 p.m.	at Virginia Tech	Lane Stadium; Blacksburg, VA	ESPN	W 45–10	59,537
October 5	8:00 p.m.	Pittsburgh	Wallace Wade Stadium; Durham, NC	ACCN	L 30–33	22,610
October 12	12:30 p.m.	Georgia Tech^{†}	Wallace Wade Stadium; Durham, NC	ACCRSN	W 41–23	21,741
October 19	3:30 p.m.	at Virginia	Scott Stadium; Charlottesville, VA	ACCN	L 14–48	52,847
October 26	4:00 p.m.	at North Carolina	Kenan Stadium; Chapel Hill, NC (Victory Bell)	ACCRSN	L 17–20	50,500
November 9	7:30 p.m.	No. 15 Notre Dame*	Wallace Wade Stadium; Durham, NC	ACCN	L 7–38	40,004
November 16	4:00 p.m.	Syracuse	Wallace Wade Stadium; Durham, NC	ACCN	L 6–49	16,286
November 23	7:30 p.m.	at Wake Forest	BB&T Field; Winston-Salem, NC (rivalry)	ACCN	L 27–39	24,130
November 30	3:30 p.m.	Miami (FL)	Wallace Wade Stadium; Durham, NC	ESPN2	W 27–17	15,913
*Non-conference game; ^{†}Homecoming; Rankings from AP Poll and CFP Rankings after November 5 released prior to game; All times are in Eastern time

== Personnel ==
2019 Duke Blue Devils football team roster
Players
Coaches
Offense

Pos.	#	Name	Class
QB	2	Daniel Karlin	Jr
WR	3	Darrell Harding	Fr
QB	4	Robert Nelson	So
WR	5	Jalon Calhoun	Fr
WR	6	Eli Pancol	Fr
RB	7	Jordan Waters	Fr
RB	8	Brittain Brown	Jr
WR	11	Scott Bracey	Jr
WR	12	Joe Hardison	So
QB	12	Gunnar Holmberg	Fr
QB	13	Jack Colyar	Fr
WR	14	Dennis Smith	Fr
QB	15	Chris Katrenick	So
QB	16	Gavin Spurrier	Fr
QB	18	Quentin Harris	Sr
WR	19	Jake Bobo	So
RB	20	Marvin Hubbard III	So
RB	21	Mataeo Durant	So
RB	22	Jaylen Coleman	Fr
WR	24	Jarret Garner	Fr
RB	25	Deon Jackson	Jr
RB	36	Elijah Deveaux	Jr
TE	46	Aaron Wright	Jr
RB	47	Ryan Wolitzer	Sr
C	50	Jack Wohlabaugh	Jr
C	55	Will Taylor	So
OL	60	Patrick Leitten	So
OT	61	Zach Tomson	So
OT	63	Jacob Monk	Fr
G	64	Tristan Westover	Jr
G	65	Julian Santos	Sr
OT	66	Jaylen Miller	Jr
G	67	Rakavius Chambers	Jr
OT	68	Elijah Wroten	Fr
G	69	Zach Baker	Sr
G	71	Maurice McIntyre	Fr
OT	72	Jack Griffin	Fr
OT	73	Anthony Hinton	Fr
OT	74	Ron Carr	Fr
C	75	Liam Smith	Jr
OT	76	Peace Addo	Fr
OT	77	Robert Kraeling	Jr
OT	78	Casey Holman	Fr
OT	79	Jacob Rimmer	So
TE	80	Matt Smith	Fr
WR	81	Aaron Young	Sr
TE	82	John Golette	Fr
TE	83	Zamari Ellis	Fr
WR	84	Trevor Horton	Fr
WR	85	Damond Philyaw-Johnson	So
TE	87	Noah Gray	Jr
TE	88	Jake Marwede	So
TE	89	Mark Birmingham	Jr

Defense

Pos.	#	Name	Class
S	2	Javon Jackson	Jr
S	4	Myles Hudzick	Jr
CB	9	Isaiah Kemp	Fr
S	10	Marquis Waters	Jr
S	11	Gio Holmes-Garrido	Sr
CB	13	Tony Davis	Fr
S	16	Dylan Singleton	Sr
S	26	Michael Carter II	Jr
S	27	Damani Neal	So
CB	28	Mark Gilbert	Jr
S	29	Nate Thompson	Fr
S	30	Jalen Alexander	Fr
CB	31	Josh Blackwell	So
LB	32	Brandon Hill	Jr
CB	33	Leonard Johnson	So
LB	34	Sayyid Stevens	Fr
S	35	Antone Williams	Jr
CB	37	Ken Torain	Fr
CB	39	Jeremiah Lewis	Fr
LB	40	Jacob Morgenstern	Jr
LB	41	Xander Gagnon	Jr
LB	42	Shaka Heyward	Fr
LB	43	Rocky Shelton II	Fr
LB	46	Mason Russell	Fr
LB	49	Koby Quansah	Sr
DE	51	Victor Dimukeje	Jr
LB	52	Cole Carteaux	So
DE	53	Scott Jones	Sr
DT	53	Tahj Rice	So
DT	54	Derrick Tangelo	Jr
DT	56	Elijah Brown	Fr
DE	59	Tre Hornbuckle	Sr
DT	60	Noah Waddell	Sr
DT	74	Michael Larbie	Fr
DE	86	Drew Jordon	Jr
DT	90	DeWayne Carter	Fr
DE	91	Ahmad Craig	Fr
DT	92	Edgar Cerenord	Sr
DE	93	Ben Frye	So
DE	94	R. J. Oben	Fr
DT	95	Trevon McSwain	Sr
DE	96	Chris Rumph II	So
DE	97	Caleb Oppan	Fr
DE	99	Christian Rorie	Fr

Special teams

Pos.	#	Name	Class
K	11	Tim Skapek	Sr
K	36	Matthew Kone	Jr
P	37	Jackson Hubbard	Jr
K	38	Jack Driggers	Jr
K	44	Charlie Ham	Fr
P	45	Austin Parker	Sr
K	48	A. J. Reed	Jr
LS	57	John Taylor	Jr
LS	58	Ben Wyatt	Jr
LS	62	Lee Rodio	Sr
P	98	Porter Wilson	Fr

Head coach

- David Cutcliffe

Coordinators/assistant coaches

- Zac Roper
  Associate head coach/offensive coordinator
- Matt Guerrieri
  Co-defensive coordinator/safeties
- Ben Albert
  Co-defensive coordinator/defensive line
- Jim Bridge
  Offensive line
- Derek Jones
  Associate head coach/cornerbacks
- Re'quan Boyette
  Running backs
- Jeff Faris
  Tight ends
- Lanier Goethie
  Linbackers
- Trooper Taylor
  Wide receivers
- Kirk Benedict
  Special teams coordinator

Legend

- (C) Team captain
- (S) Suspended
- (I) Ineligible
- Injured
- Redshirt

Roster
Last update: January 16, 2026

== Game summaries ==
=== Vs. No. 2 Alabama (Chick-fil-A Kickoff Game) ===
	1	2	3	4	Total
Blue Devils	0	3	0	0	3
No. 2 Crimson Tide	0	14	21	7	42

Statistics	DUKE	ALA
First downs	11	30
Total yards	204	512
Rushing yards	107	145
Passing yards	97	367
Turnovers	3	1
Time of possession	23:23	36:37

Team	Category	Player	Statistics
Duke	Passing	Quentin Harris	12/22, 97 yards, 2 INT
Duke	Rushing	Brittain Brown	7 rushes, 36 yards
Duke	Receiving	Noah Gray	5 receptions, 45 yards
Alabama	Passing	Tua Tagovailoa	26/31, 336 yards, 4 TD
Alabama	Rushing	Jerome Ford	10 rushes, 64 yards, TD
Alabama	Receiving	Jerry Jeudy	10 receptions, 137 yards, TD

=== No. 15 (FCS) North Carolina A&T ===
	1	2	3	4	Total
No. 15 (FCS) Aggies	3	7	3	0	13
Blue Devils	7	21	10	7	45

Statistics	NCAT	DUKE
First downs	10	31
Total yards	249	574
Rushing yards	138	210
Passing yards	111	364
Turnovers	2	2
Time of possession	25:30	34:30

Team	Category	Player	Statistics
North Carolina A&T	Passing	Kylil Carter	8/22, 111 yards
North Carolina A&T	Rushing	Jah-Maine Martin	10 rushes, 82 yards, TD
North Carolina A&T	Receiving	Elijah Bell	2 receptions, 52 yards
Duke	Passing	Quentin Harris	30/42, 345 yards, 4 TD
Duke	Rushing	Quentin Harris	13 rushes, 83 yards, TD
Duke	Receiving	Jalon Calhoun	8 receptions, 105 yards, 2 TD

=== At Middle Tennessee ===
	1	2	3	4	Total
Blue Devils	14	17	10	0	41
Blue Raiders	3	0	8	7	18

Statistics	DUKE	MTSU
First downs	26	19
Total yards	463	339
Rushing yards	226	138
Passing yards	237	201
Turnovers	0	0
Time of possession	34:07	25:53

Team	Category	Player	Statistics
Duke	Passing	Quentin Harris	24/27, 237 yards, 4 TD
Duke	Rushing	Quentin Harris	11 rushes, 107 yards
Duke	Receiving	Aaron Young	6 receptions, 106 yards, 2 TD
Middle Tennessee	Passing	Asher O'Hara	19/27, 201 yards, 2 TD
Middle Tennessee	Rushing	Asher O'Hara	18 rushes, 67 yards
Middle Tennessee	Receiving	Jimmy Marshall	3 receptions, 42 yards

=== At Virginia Tech ===
	1	2	3	4	Total
Blue Devils	0	21	10	14	45
Hokies	3	0	7	0	10

Statistics	DUKE	VT
First downs	24	14
Total yards	422	259
Rushing yards	234	139
Passing yards	188	120
Turnovers	0	2
Time of possession	32:14	27:46

Team	Category	Player	Statistics
Duke	Passing	Quentin Harris	20/27, 163 yards, 2 TD
Duke	Rushing	Quentin Harris	17 rushes, 100 yards, TD
Duke	Receiving	Mataeo Durant	3 receptions, 53 yards
Virginia Tech	Passing	Ryan Willis	7/18, 112 yards, TD, INT
Virginia Tech	Rushing	DeShawn McClease	17 rushes, 102 yards
Virginia Tech	Receiving	Damon Hazleton	1 reception, 72 yards, TD

=== Pittsburgh ===
	1	2	3	4	Total
Panthers	10	9	7	7	33
Blue Devils	3	0	7	20	30

Statistics	PITT	DUKE
First downs	22	20
Total yards	337	288
Rushing yards	69	123
Passing yards	268	165
Turnovers	4	6
Time of possession	30:11	29:49

Team	Category	Player	Statistics
Pittsburgh	Passing	Kenny Pickett	29/48, 268 yards, 3 TD, 2 INT
Pittsburgh	Rushing	Todd Sibley	12 rushes, 60 yards
Pittsburgh	Receiving	Taysir Mack	9 receptions, 85 yards, TD
Duke	Passing	Quentin Harris	18/43, 165 yards, TD, 2 INT
Duke	Rushing	Deon Jackson	19 rushes, 60 yards, TD
Duke	Receiving	Deon Jackson	2 receptions, 47 yards, TD

=== Georgia Tech ===
	1	2	3	4	Total
Yellow Jackets	7	7	3	6	23
Blue Devils	10	28	3	0	41

Statistics	GT	DUKE
First downs	20	20
Total yards	379	373
Rushing yards	173	197
Passing yards	206	176
Turnovers	0	0
Time of possession	27:32	32:28

Team	Category	Player	Statistics
Georgia Tech	Passing	James Graham	15/35, 206 yards, TD
Georgia Tech	Rushing	Jordan Mason	18 rushes, 106 yards
Georgia Tech	Receiving	Adonicas Sanders	3 receptions, 69 yards
Duke	Passing	Quentin Harris	11/20, 176 yards
Duke	Rushing	Mataeo Durant	13 rushes, 74 yards
Duke	Receiving	Jalon Calhoun	4 receptions, 68 yards

=== At Virginia ===
	1	2	3	4	Total
Blue Devils	0	0	7	7	14
Cavaliers	0	17	24	7	48

Statistics	DUKE	UVA
First downs	14	17
Total yards	250	307
Rushing yards	132	154
Passing yards	118	153
Turnovers	5	2
Time of possession	25:31	34:29

Team	Category	Player	Statistics
Duke	Passing	Quentin Harris	13/26, 88 yards, TD, 2 INT
Duke	Rushing	Quentin Harris	8 rushes, 37 yards
Duke	Receiving	Scott Bracey	2 receptions, 43 yards, TD
Virginia	Passing	Bryce Perkins	13/26, 141 yards, INT
Virginia	Rushing	Wayne Taulapapa	14 rushes, 77 yards, 2 TD
Virginia	Receiving	Hasise Dubois	4 receptions, 62 yards

=== At North Carolina ===
	1	2	3	4	Total
Blue Devils	3	0	14	0	17
Tar Heels	7	0	10	3	20

Statistics	DUKE	UNC
First downs	22	22
Total yards	329	432
Rushing yards	100	205
Passing yards	229	227
Turnovers	3	3
Time of possession	29:18	30:42

Team	Category	Player	Statistics
Duke	Passing	Quentin Harris	22/39, 229 yards, TD, INT
Duke	Rushing	Deon Jackson	19 rushes, 91 yards
Duke	Receiving	Scott Bracy	5 receptions, 62 yards, TD
North Carolina	Passing	Sam Howell	10/26, 227 yards, 2 TD, 2 INT
North Carolina	Rushing	Javonte Williams	22 rushes, 111 yards
North Carolina	Receiving	Dazz Newsome	4 receptions, 103 yards, TD

=== No. 15 Notre Dame ===
	1	2	3	4	Total
No. 15 Fighting Irish	14	7	7	10	38
Blue Devils	0	7	0	0	7

Statistics	ND	DUKE
First downs	21	10
Total yards	469	197
Rushing yards	288	95
Passing yards	181	102
Turnovers	2	2
Time of possession	32:52	27:08

Team	Category	Player	Statistics
Notre Dame	Passing	Ian Book	18/32, 181 yards, 4 TD, 2 INT
Notre Dame	Rushing	Ian Book	12 rushes, 139 yards
Notre Dame	Receiving	Chase Claypool	5 receptions, 97 yards, TD
Duke	Passing	Quentin Harris	16/28, 102 yards, TD, INT
Duke	Rushing	Deon Jackson	14 rushes, 52 yards
Duke	Receiving	Aaron Young	2 receptions, 30 yards, TD

=== Syracuse ===
	1	2	3	4	Total
Orange	14	0	21	14	49
Blue Devils	0	6	0	0	6

Statistics	SYR	DUKE
First downs	16	19
Total yards	395	279
Rushing yards	286	122
Passing yards	109	157
Turnovers	0	3
Time of possession	27:18	32:42

Team	Category	Player	Statistics
Syracuse	Passing	Tommy DeVito	6/15, 105 yards, 2 TD
Syracuse	Rushing	Moe Neal	17 rushes, 115 yards, TD
Syracuse	Receiving	Trishton Jackson	2 receptions, 68 yards, TD
Duke	Passing	Quentin Harris	19/36, 157 yards, 2 INT
Duke	Rushing	Mataeo Durant	11 rushes, 54 yards
Duke	Receiving	Aaron Young	5 receptions, 63 yards

=== At Wake Forest ===
	1	2	3	4	Total
Blue Devils	7	3	3	14	27
Demon Deacons	3	10	10	16	39

Statistics	DUKE	WAKE
First downs	13	26
Total yards	290	618
Rushing yards	127	334
Passing yards	163	284
Turnovers	3	0
Time of possession	20:27	39:33

Team	Category	Player	Statistics
Duke	Passing	Quentin Harris	14/23, 163 yards, TD, INT
Duke	Rushing	Mataeo Durant	7 rushes, 71 yards
Duke	Receiving	Noah Gray	7 receptions, 76 yards, TD
Wake Forest	Passing	Jamie Newman	14/25, 284 yards, TD
Wake Forest	Rushing	Jamie Newman	29 rushes, 144 yards, TD
Wake Forest	Receiving	Kendall Hinton	6 receptions, 189 yards, TD

=== Miami (FL) ===
	1	2	3	4	Total
Hurricanes	0	14	3	0	17
Blue Devils	3	10	0	14	27

Statistics	MIA	DUKE
First downs	15	14
Total yards	259	287
Rushing yards	98	131
Passing yards	161	156
Turnovers	1	1
Time of possession	33:19	26:41

Team	Category	Player	Statistics
Miami	Passing	Jarren Williams	11/26, 142 yards, TD
Miami	Rushing	Robert Burns	18 rushes, 48 yards
Miami	Receiving	Will Mallory	4 receptions, 93 yards
Duke	Passing	Quentin Harris	10/24, 156 yards, TD
Duke	Rushing	Mataeo Durant	7 rushes, 59 yards
Duke	Receiving	Jalon Calhoun	3 receptions, 82 yards, TD
