= Bryce Hall (American football) =

American football player (born 1997)

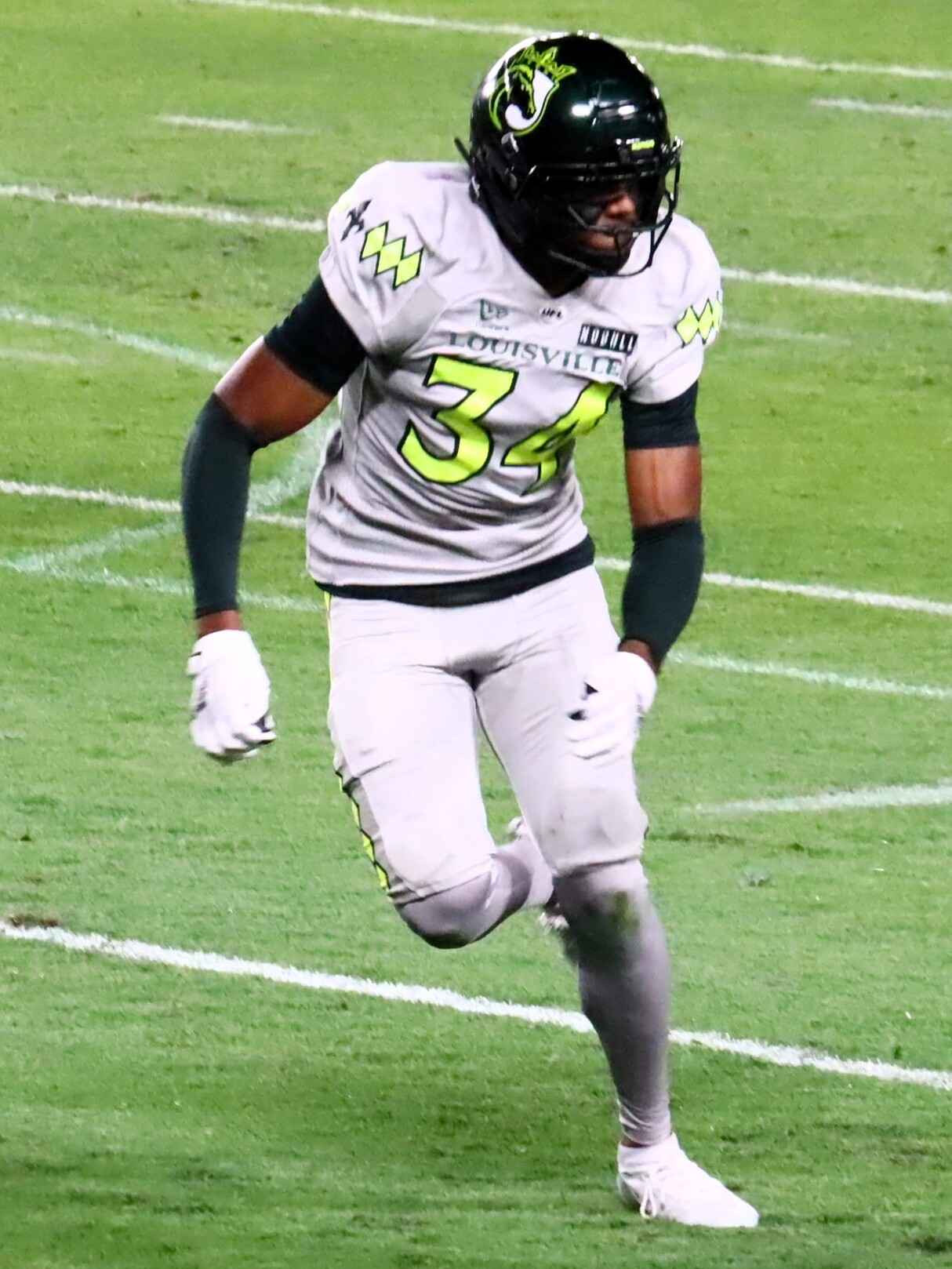
- Hall with the Louisville Kings in 2026

No. 34 – Houston Texans
- Position: Cornerback
- Roster status: Practice squad

Personal information
- Born: November 5, 1997 (age 29); Harrisburg, Pennsylvania, U.S.
- Listed height: 6 ft 1 in (1.85 m)
- Listed weight: 202 lb (92 kg)

Career information
- High school: Bishop McDevitt (Harrisburg)
- College: Virginia (2016–2019)
- NFL draft: 2020: 5th round, 158th overall pick

Career history
- New York Jets (2020–2023); Tampa Bay Buccaneers (2024–2025); Louisville Kings (2026); Houston Texans (2026–present)

Awards and highlights
- UFL champion (2026); Second-team All-American (2018)

Career NFL statistics as of Week 6, 2026
- Total tackles: 123
- Sacks: 0.5
- Fumble recoveries: 1
- Pass deflections: 21
- Interceptions: 2
- Defensive touchdowns: 1
- Stats at Pro Football Reference

Bryce Hall (born November 5, 1997) is an American professional football cornerback for the Houston Texans of the National Football League (NFL). He played college football for the Virginia Cavaliers and previously played in the NFL for the New York Jets and Tampa Bay Buccaneers.

== Early life ==
Playing at Bishop McDevitt High School in Harrisburg, Pennsylvania, Hall played mostly wide receiver but was also sparingly used in the defensive backfield. He was rated as a two-star prospect, and chose Virginia over only one other Football Bowl Subdivision scholarship offer, Coastal Carolina. He originally committed to Virginia as an athlete, with more accolades on the offensive side of the ball.

== College career ==
Receiving playing time as a true freshman in 2016, Hall became a starter in the defensive lineup after switching from wide receiver to cornerback. He continued to build during his sophomore season, starting every game.

Hall led all collegiate players in pass breakups his junior year, and he explored the possibility of entering the 2019 NFL draft, even getting a grade from the NFL's Draft Advisory Board. After Virginia beat South Carolina in the 2018 Belk Bowl, Hall announced that he would return to Virginia for his senior year. Mock drafts for 2019 had Hall going as high as the first round. Despite earning first-team All-Atlantic Coast Conference and second-team All-American honors after his junior year, Hall cited a desire to improve himself and the Cavalier program as a main reason to stay for his senior season.

Preliminary mock drafts before the 2019 season projected Hall as a first-round prospect in the 2020 NFL draft.

On October 12, 2019, in Virginia's sixth game of the season, Hall suffered an ankle injury in the second quarter against Miami which required surgery, effectively ending his senior season and collegiate career.

== Professional career ==
Pre-draft measurables
Height	Weight	Arm length	Hand span	Wingspan	Bench press
6 ft 1 1/4 in (1.86 m)	202 lb (92 kg)	32 1/4 in (0.82 m)	9 5/8 in (0.24 m)	6 ft 6 1/2 in (1.99 m)	11 reps
All values from NFL Combine

=== New York Jets ===
Hall was selected in the fifth round of the 2020 NFL Draft with the 158th overall pick by the New York Jets. He was placed on the reserve/COVID-19 list by the Jets on July 28, 2020. He was activated on August 27, 2020, and placed on the active/non-football injury list. He was placed on reserve/non-football injury on September 5, 2020. He was activated on November 9, 2020. In Week 15 against the Los Angeles Rams, Hall recorded his first career interception off a pass thrown by Jared Goff during the 23–20 win.

=== Tampa Bay Buccaneers ===
On March 15, 2024, Hall signed with the Tampa Bay Buccaneers. He suffered an ankle injury in Week 1 and was placed on injured reserve on September 10. Tom Pelissero reported Hall suffered a dislocated ankle and fractured fibula.

On March 18, 2025, the Buccaneers re-signed Hall to a one-year contract. He was waived on August 26 as part of final roster cuts and re-signed to the practice squad the next day.

=== Louisville Kings ===
On February 10, 2026, Hall signed with the Louisville Kings of the United Football League.

=== Houston Texans ===
On August 17, 2026, Hall signed with the Houston Texans. Hall was released by Houston on August 30 as a part of final roster cuts; he was re-signed to the team's practice squad the next day.
