= Jarrod Hewitt =

American gridiron football player (born 1997)

No. 98
- Position: Defensive lineman

Personal information
- Born: November 3, 1997 (age 29); Venice, Florida, U.S.
- Listed height: 6 ft 1 in (1.85 m)
- Listed weight: 280 lb (127 kg)

Career information
- High school: Venice
- College: Virginia Tech (2016–2020)
- NFL draft: 2021: undrafted

Career history
- 2021–2022: Seattle Seahawks*
- 2023: Hamilton Tiger-Cats
- * Offseason or practice squad member only

Awards and highlights
- Third-team All-ACC (2020)
- Stats at CFL.ca

Jarrod Hewitt (born November 3, 1997) is an American former professional football defensive lineman who played for the Hamilton Tiger-Cats of the Canadian Football League (CFL). He played college football for the Virginia Tech Hokies. He was also a member of the Seattle Seahawks of the National Football League (NFL).

== Early life ==
Hewitt played high school football at Venice High School in Venice, Florida. He recorded 112 tackles and 12 sacks his junior year and 105 tackles and 10 sacks his senior year, earning first team all-state honor both seasons. He was named the Herald Tribune Player of the Year as a senior. Hewitt was also a competitive powerlifter in high school.

== College career ==
Hewitt played college football at Virginia Tech from 2017 to 2020. He redshirted in 2016.

Hewitt played in 10 games in 2017, totaling 13 tackles and one fumble recovery. He played in 11 games, starting 10, in 2018, accumulating 15 tackles and one fumble recovery. He started 13 games in 2019, recording 33 tackles, four sacks, one pass breakup, and one forced fumble. Hewitt appeared in 11 games, starting 10, in 2020, totaling 31 tackles and 5.5 sacks, garnering third team All-Atlantic Coast Conference (ACC) recognition

== Professional career ==
Hewitt signed with the Seattle Seahawks of the National Football League (NFL) on May 14, 2021, after going undrafted in the 2021 NFL draft. He was released on August 31 and signed to the team's practice squad on September 1, 2021. He signed a futures contract with the Seahawks on January 11, 2022. Hewitt was released on August 30 and signed to the practice squad on November 21. He was released again on December 6 but re-signed to the practice squad on December 20, 2022. He signed a futures contract on January 16, 2023. Hewitt was released on April 17, 2023.

Hewitt was signed to the practice roster of the Hamilton Tiger-Cats of the Canadian Football League (CFL) on June 14, 2023. He was moved between the practice roster, active roster, and injured reserve several times during the 2023 season. Overall, he dressed in seven games, starting one, for the Tiger-Cats in 2023, recording five tackles on defense. Hewitt was released on May 27, 2024.

== Coaching career ==
Hewitt later became a defensive graduate assistant at NC State.
