= 2019–20 NCAA football bowl games =

Series of college football bowl games following the 2019 season

- Season: 2019
- Regular season: August 24, 2019 – December 14, 2019
- Number of bowls: 41 (Note: 40 FBS bowl games, including the College Football Playoff National Championship Game, and 1 FCS bowl game.)
- All-star games: 5
- Bowl games: December 20, 2019 – January 13, 2020 (Note: Dates exclude all-star games.)
- National Championship: 2020 College Football Playoff; National Championship
- Location of Championship: Mercedes-Benz Superdome; New Orleans, LA
- Champions: LSU Tigers
- Bowl Challenge Cup winner: SEC
Bowl record by conference
Conference	Bowls	Record	Number of teams in final AP poll
ACC	11	4–7 (0.364)	1
SEC	10	8–2 (0.800)	5
Big Ten	9	4–5 (0.444)	6
Conference USA	8	3–5 (0.375)	0
American	7	4–3 (0.571)	4
Mountain West	7	4–3 (0.571)	2
Pac-12	7	4–3 (0.571)	2
MAC	7	3–4 (0.429)	0
Big 12	6	1–5 (0.167)	3
Sun Belt	5	3–2 (0.600)	1
Independents	3	2–1 (0.667)	1

The 2019–20 NCAA football games were a series of college football bowl games played to complete the 2019 NCAA Division I FBS football season. The games began on December 20, 2019, and, aside from the all-star games that followed, ended with the 2020 College Football Playoff National Championship played on January 13, 2020.

The total of 40 team-competitive bowls in FBS, including the national championship game, was unchanged from the previous season. With the first staging of the Hula Bowl since January 2008, the number of all-star games increased from three to four.

== Schedule ==
The schedule for the 2019–20 bowl games is below. All times are EST (UTC−5). The schedule consists of 40 bowl games in FBS (the New Year's Six bowl games, 33 additional bowl games, and the National Championship game) and one bowl game in FCS (the Celebration Bowl). Division II bowls and Division III bowls are not included here. After the National Championship game, there are additionally four all-star games scheduled.

=== College Football Playoff and Championship Game ===
The College Football Playoff system is used to determine a national championship of Division I FBS college football. A 13-member committee of experts ranked the top 25 teams in the nation after each of the last seven weeks of the regular season. The top four teams in the final ranking were seeded in a single-elimination semifinal round, with the winners advancing to the National Championship game.

The semifinal games for the 2019–20 season were the Peach Bowl and the Fiesta Bowl. Both were played on December 28, 2019, as part of a yearly rotation of three pairs of six bowls, commonly referred to as the New Year's Six bowl games. The winners advanced to the 2020 College Football Playoff National Championship at Mercedes-Benz Superdome in New Orleans, Louisiana, scheduled for January 13, 2020.

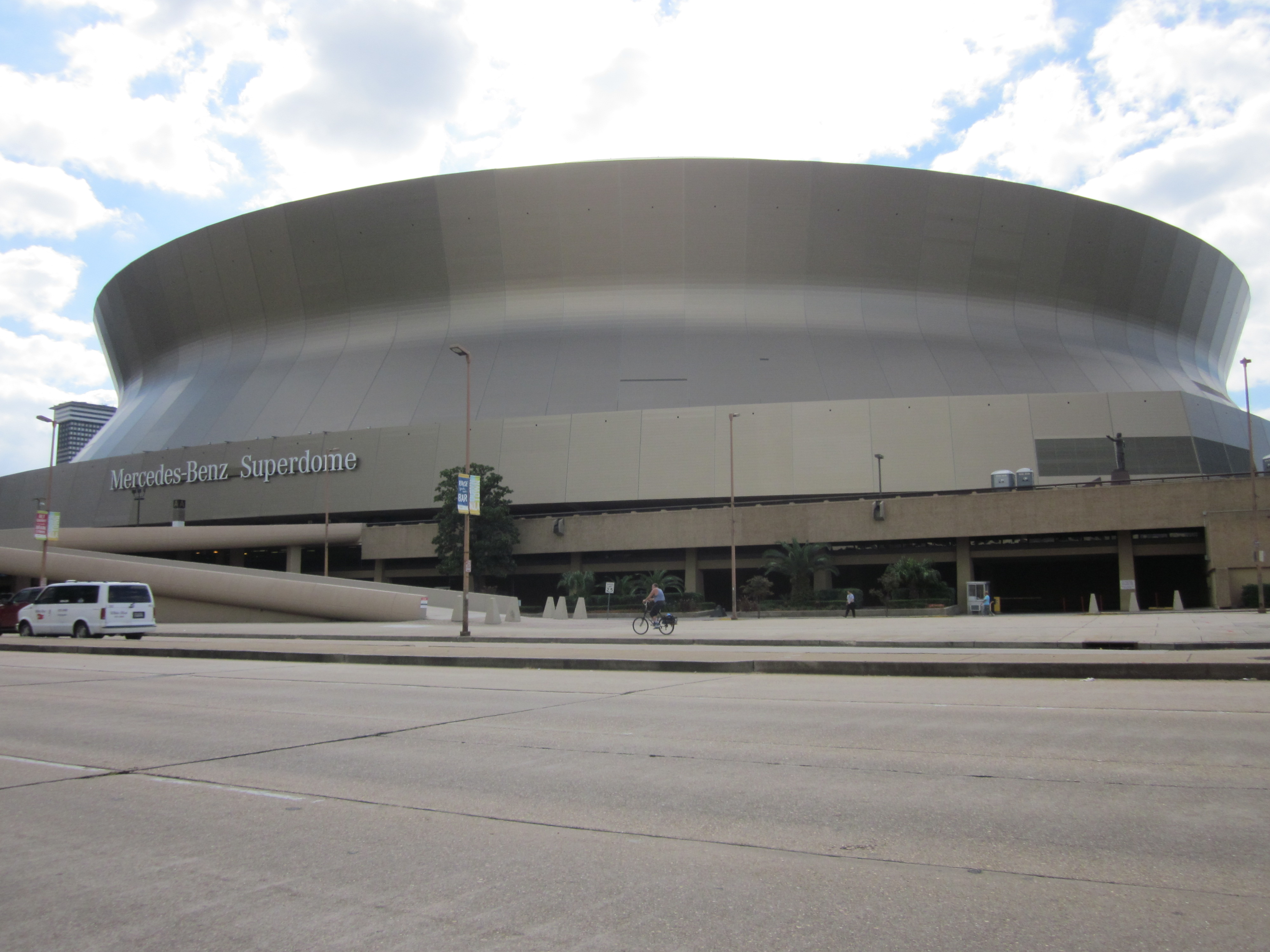
Mercedes-Benz Superdome, site of the National Championship game

Semifinals
December 28 – Peach Bowl Mercedes-Benz Stadium, Atlanta
1	LSU	63
4	Oklahoma	28
December 28 – Fiesta Bowl State Farm Stadium, Glendale
2	Ohio State	23
3	Clemson	29

Championship
January 13 – National Championship Mercedes-Benz Superdome, New Orleans
1	LSU	42
3	Clemson	25

Each of the games in the following table was televised by ESPN.

Date	Time (EST)	Game	Site	Teams	Affiliations	Results
Dec. 28	12:00 p.m.	Cotton Bowl Classic	AT&T Stadium; Arlington, Texas	No. 10 Penn State Nittany Lions (10–2); No. 17 Memphis Tigers (12–1)	Big Ten; American	Penn State 53; Memphis 39
Dec. 28	4:00 p.m.	Peach Bowl (Playoff Semifinal Game)	Mercedes-Benz Stadium; Atlanta, Georgia	No. 1 LSU Tigers (13–0); No. 4 Oklahoma Sooners (12–1)	SEC; Big 12	LSU 63; Oklahoma 28
Dec. 28	8:00 p.m.	Fiesta Bowl (Playoff Semifinal Game)	State Farm Stadium; Glendale, Arizona	No. 3 Clemson Tigers (13–0); No. 2 Ohio State Buckeyes (13–0)	ACC; Big Ten	Clemson 29; Ohio State 23
Dec. 30	8:00 p.m.	Orange Bowl	Hard Rock Stadium; Miami Gardens, Florida	No. 9 Florida Gators (10–2); No. 24 Virginia Cavaliers (9–4)	SEC; ACC	Florida 36; Virginia 28
Jan. 1	5:00 p.m.	Rose Bowl	Rose Bowl; Pasadena, California	No. 6 Oregon Ducks (11–2); No. 8 Wisconsin Badgers (10–3)	Pac-12; Big Ten	Oregon 28; Wisconsin 27
Jan. 1	8:45 p.m.	Sugar Bowl	Mercedes-Benz Superdome; New Orleans, Louisiana	No. 5 Georgia Bulldogs (11–2); No. 7 Baylor Bears (11–2)	SEC; Big 12	Georgia 26; Baylor 14
Jan. 13	8:00 p.m.	College Football Playoff National Championship (Peach Bowl Winner vs. Fiesta Bowl Winner)	Mercedes-Benz Superdome; New Orleans, Louisiana	No. 1 LSU Tigers (14–0); No. 3 Clemson Tigers (14–0)	SEC; ACC	LSU 42; Clemson 25

=== Non CFP bowl games ===
For the 2019–20 bowl season, the Dollar General Bowl changed sponsors to become the LendingTree Bowl. The Cure Bowl, previously held at Camping World Stadium, changed venues to Exploria Stadium—both are in Orlando, Florida. As the First Responder Bowl's usual venue of the Cotton Bowl in Dallas was unavailable due to a scheduling conflict with the 2020 NHL Winter Classic, the 2019 edition was played at Gerald J. Ford Stadium in nearby University Park, Texas.

Date	Time (EST)	Game	Site	Television	Teams (Note: Win–loss records are prior to the bowl game being played.)	Affiliations (Note: Conferences listed reflect those of the actual participants.)	Results
Dec. 20	2:00 p.m.	Bahamas Bowl	Thomas Robinson Stadium; Nassau, Bahamas	ESPN	Buffalo Bulls (7–5); Charlotte 49ers (7–5)	MAC; C–USA	Buffalo 31; Charlotte 9
Dec. 20	7:30 p.m.	Frisco Bowl	Toyota Stadium; Frisco, Texas	ESPN2	Kent State Golden Flashes (6–6); Utah State Aggies (7–5)	MAC; MWC	Kent State 51; Utah State 41
Dec. 21	2:00 p.m.	New Mexico Bowl	Dreamstyle Stadium; Albuquerque, New Mexico	ESPN	San Diego State Aztecs (9–3); Central Michigan Chippewas (8–5)	MWC; MAC	San Diego State 48; Central Michigan 11
Dec. 21	2:30 p.m.	Cure Bowl	Exploria Stadium; Orlando, Florida	CBSSN	Liberty Flames (7–5); Georgia Southern Eagles (7–5)	Independent; Sun Belt	Liberty 23; Georgia Southern 16
Dec. 21	3:30 p.m.	Boca Raton Bowl	FAU Stadium; Boca Raton, Florida	ABC	Florida Atlantic Owls (10–3); SMU Mustangs (10–2)	C–USA; American	Florida Atlantic 52; SMU 28
Dec. 21	5:30 p.m.	Camellia Bowl	Cramton Bowl; Montgomery, Alabama	ESPN	Arkansas State Red Wolves (7–5); FIU Panthers (6–6)	Sun Belt; C–USA	Arkansas State 34; FIU 26
Dec. 21	7:30 p.m.	Las Vegas Bowl	Sam Boyd Stadium; Whitney, Nevada	ABC	Washington Huskies (7–5); No. 19 Boise State Broncos (12–1)	Pac-12; MWC	Washington 38; Boise State 7
Dec. 21	9:00 p.m.	New Orleans Bowl	Mercedes-Benz Superdome; New Orleans, Louisiana	ESPN	No. 20 Appalachian State Mountaineers (12–1); UAB Blazers (9–4)	Sun Belt; C–USA	Appalachian State 31; UAB 17
Dec. 23	2:30 p.m.	Gasparilla Bowl	Raymond James Stadium; Tampa, Florida	ESPN	UCF Knights (9–3); Marshall Thundering Herd (8–4)	American; C–USA	UCF 48; Marshall 25
Dec. 24	8:00 p.m.	Hawaii Bowl	Aloha Stadium; Honolulu, Hawaii	ESPN	Hawaii Rainbow Warriors (9–5); BYU Cougars (7–5)	MWC; Independent	Hawaii 38; BYU 34
Dec. 26	4:00 p.m.	Independence Bowl	Independence Stadium; Shreveport, Louisiana	ESPN	Louisiana Tech Bulldogs (9–3); Miami (FL) Hurricanes (6–6)	C–USA; ACC	Louisiana Tech 14; Miami (FL) 0
Dec. 26	8:00 p.m.	Quick Lane Bowl	Ford Field; Detroit, Michigan	ESPN	Pittsburgh Panthers (7–5); Eastern Michigan Eagles (6–6)	ACC; MAC	Pittsburgh 34; Eastern Michigan 30
Dec. 27	12:00 p.m.	Military Bowl	Navy–Marine Corps Memorial Stadium; Annapolis, Maryland	ESPN	North Carolina Tar Heels (6–6); Temple Owls (8–4)	ACC; American	North Carolina 55; Temple 13
Dec. 27	3:20 p.m.	Pinstripe Bowl	Yankee Stadium; The Bronx, New York	ESPN	Michigan State Spartans (6–6); Wake Forest Demon Deacons (8–4)	Big Ten; ACC	Michigan State 27; Wake Forest 21
Dec. 27	6:45 p.m.	Texas Bowl	NRG Stadium; Houston, Texas	ESPN	Texas A&M Aggies (7–5); No. 25 Oklahoma State Cowboys (8–4)	SEC; Big 12	Texas A&M 24; Oklahoma State 21
Dec. 27	8:00 p.m.	Holiday Bowl	SDCCU Stadium; San Diego, California	FS1	No. 16 Iowa Hawkeyes (9–3); No. 22 USC Trojans (8–4)	Big Ten; Pac-12	Iowa 49; USC 24
Dec. 27	10:15 p.m.	Cheez-It Bowl	Chase Field; Phoenix, Arizona	ESPN	Air Force Falcons (10–2); Washington State Cougars (6–6)	MWC; Pac-12	Air Force 31; Washington State 21
Dec. 28	12:00 p.m.	Camping World Bowl	Camping World Stadium; Orlando, Florida	ABC	No. 15 Notre Dame Fighting Irish (10–2); Iowa State Cyclones (7–5)	Independent; Big 12	Notre Dame 33; Iowa State 9
Dec. 30	12:30 p.m.	First Responder Bowl	Gerald J. Ford Stadium; University Park, Texas	ESPN	Western Kentucky Hilltoppers (8–4); Western Michigan Broncos (7–5)	C–USA; MAC	Western Kentucky 23; Western Michigan 20
Dec. 30	4:00 p.m.	Music City Bowl	Nissan Stadium; Nashville, Tennessee	ESPN	Louisville Cardinals (7–5); Mississippi State Bulldogs (6–6)	ACC; SEC	Louisville 38; Mississippi State 28
Dec. 30	4:00 p.m.	Redbox Bowl	Levi's Stadium; Santa Clara, California	Fox	California Golden Bears (7–5); Illinois Fighting Illini (6–6)	Pac-12; Big Ten	California 35; Illinois 20
Dec. 31	12:00 p.m.	Belk Bowl	Bank of America Stadium; Charlotte, North Carolina	ESPN	Kentucky Wildcats (7–5); Virginia Tech Hokies (8–4)	SEC; ACC	Kentucky 37; Virginia Tech 30
Dec. 31	2:00 p.m.	Sun Bowl	Sun Bowl; El Paso, Texas	CBS	Arizona State Sun Devils (7–5); Florida State Seminoles (6–6)	Pac-12; ACC	Arizona State 20; Florida State 14
Dec. 31	3:45 p.m.	Liberty Bowl	Liberty Bowl Memorial Stadium; Memphis, Tennessee	ESPN	No. 23 Navy Midshipmen (10–2); Kansas State Wildcats (8–4)	American; Big 12	Navy 20; Kansas State 17
Dec. 31	4:30 p.m.	Arizona Bowl	Arizona Stadium; Tucson, Arizona	CBSSN	Wyoming Cowboys (7–5); Georgia State Panthers (7–5)	MWC; Sun Belt	Wyoming 38; Georgia State 17
Dec. 31	7:30 p.m.	Alamo Bowl	Alamodome; San Antonio, Texas	ESPN	Texas Longhorns (7–5); No. 11 Utah Utes (11–2)	Big 12; Pac-12	Texas 38; Utah 10
Jan. 1	1:00 p.m.	Citrus Bowl	Camping World Stadium; Orlando, Florida	ABC	No. 13 Alabama Crimson Tide (10–2); No. 14 Michigan Wolverines (9–3)	SEC; Big Ten	Alabama 35; Michigan 16
Jan. 1	1:00 p.m.	Outback Bowl	Raymond James Stadium; Tampa, Florida	ESPN	No. 18 Minnesota Golden Gophers (10–2); No. 12 Auburn Tigers (9–3)	Big Ten; SEC	Minnesota 31; Auburn 24
Jan. 2	3:00 p.m.	Birmingham Bowl	Legion Field; Birmingham, Alabama	ESPN	No. 21 Cincinnati Bearcats (10–3); Boston College Eagles (6–6)	American; ACC	Cincinnati 38; Boston College 6
Jan. 2	7:00 p.m.	Gator Bowl	TIAA Bank Field; Jacksonville, Florida	ESPN	Tennessee Volunteers (7–5); Indiana Hoosiers (8–4)	SEC; Big Ten	Tennessee 23; Indiana 22
Jan. 3	3:30 p.m.	Famous Idaho Potato Bowl	Albertsons Stadium; Boise, Idaho	ESPN	Ohio Bobcats (6–6); Nevada Wolf Pack (7–5)	MAC; MWC	Ohio 30; Nevada 21
Jan. 4	11:30 a.m.	Armed Forces Bowl	Amon G. Carter Stadium; Fort Worth, Texas	ESPN	Tulane Green Wave (6–6); Southern Miss Golden Eagles (7–5)	American; C–USA	Tulane 30; Southern Miss 13
Jan. 6	7:30 p.m.	LendingTree Bowl	Ladd–Peebles Stadium; Mobile, Alabama	ESPN	Louisiana Ragin' Cajuns (10–3); Miami (OH) RedHawks (8–5)	Sun Belt; MAC	Louisiana 27; Miami (OH) 17

=== FCS bowl game ===
The FCS has one bowl game. They also had a championship bracket that culminated in the 2020 NCAA Division I Football Championship Game.

Date	Time (EST)	Game	Site	Television	Participants	Affiliations	Results
Dec. 21	12:00 p.m.	Celebration Bowl	Mercedes-Benz Stadium; Atlanta, Georgia	ABC	North Carolina A&T Aggies (8–3); Alcorn State Braves (9–3)	MEAC; SWAC	North Carolina A&T 64; Alcorn State 44

=== All-star games ===
Organizers renamed the East–West Shrine Game to East–West Shrine Bowl. The Hula Bowl returned for its first playing since January 2008.

Date	Time (EST)	Game	Site	Television	Participants	Results
Jan. 12		Tropical Bowl	Spec Martin Stadium; DeLand, Florida		National Team; American Team	National 35; American 7
Jan. 18	3:00 p.m.	East–West Shrine Bowl	Tropicana Field; St. Petersburg, Florida	NFL Network	East Team; West Team	East 31; West 27
Jan. 18	7:00 p.m.	NFLPA Collegiate Bowl	Rose Bowl; Pasadena, California	NFL Network	National Team; American Team	National 30; American 20
Jan. 25	2:30 p.m.	Senior Bowl	Ladd–Peebles Stadium; Mobile, Alabama	NFL Network	North Team; South Team	North 34; South 17
Jan. 26	10:30 p.m.	Hula Bowl	Aloha Stadium; Honolulu, Hawaii	CBS Sports Network	Team Kai; Team Aina	Kai 23; Aina 7

== Team selections ==
=== CFP top 25 standings and bowl games ===
On December 8, 2019, the College Football Playoff selection committee announced its final team rankings for the year. Two of the four semifinalists – Clemson and Oklahoma – had also been semifinalists the previous season. This was the sixth year of the College Football Playoff era, and the first year that Alabama was not in the semifinals.

Rank	Team	W–L	Conference and standing	Bowl game
1	LSU Tigers	13–0	SEC champions	Peach Bowl (CFP semifinal)
2	Ohio State Buckeyes	13–0	Big Ten champions	Fiesta Bowl (CFP semifinal)
3	Clemson Tigers	13–0	ACC champions	Fiesta Bowl (CFP semifinal)
4	Oklahoma Sooners	12–1	Big 12 champions	Peach Bowl (CFP semifinal)
5	Georgia Bulldogs	11–2	SEC East Division champions	Sugar Bowl (NY6)
6	Oregon Ducks	11–2	Pac-12 champions	Rose Bowl (NY6)
7	Baylor Bears	11–2	Big 12 first place (tie)	Sugar Bowl (NY6)
8	Wisconsin Badgers	10–3	Big Ten West Division co-champions	Rose Bowl (NY6)
9	Florida Gators	10–2	SEC East division second place	Orange Bowl (NY6)
10	Penn State Nittany Lions	10–2	Big Ten East Division second place	Cotton Bowl (NY6)
11	Utah Utes	11–2	Pac-12 South Division champions	Alamo Bowl
12	Auburn Tigers	9–3	SEC West Division third place	Outback Bowl
13	Alabama Crimson Tide	10–2	SEC West Division second place	Citrus Bowl
14	Michigan Wolverines	9–3	Big Ten East Division third place	Citrus Bowl
15	Notre Dame Fighting Irish	10–2	Independent	Camping World Bowl
16	Iowa Hawkeyes	9–3	Big Ten West Division third place	Holiday Bowl
17	Memphis Tigers	12–1	American champions	Cotton Bowl (NY6)
18	Minnesota Golden Gophers	10–2	Big Ten West Division co-champions	Outback Bowl
19	Boise State Broncos	12–1	Mountain West champions	Las Vegas Bowl
20	Appalachian State Mountaineers	12–1	Sun Belt champions	New Orleans Bowl
21	Cincinnati Bearcats	10–3	American East Division champions	Birmingham Bowl
22	USC Trojans	8–4	Pac-12 South Division second place	Holiday Bowl
23	Navy Midshipmen	10–2	American West Division co-champions	Liberty Bowl
24	Virginia Cavaliers	9–4	ACC Coastal Division champions	Orange Bowl (NY6)
25	Oklahoma State Cowboys	8–4	Big 12 third place (tie)	Texas Bowl

=== Conference champions' bowl games ===
Two bowls featured a matchup of conference champions—the Fiesta Bowl and the Peach Bowl. Rankings are per the above CFP standings.

Conference	Champion	W–L	Rank	Bowl game
ACC	Clemson Tigers	13–0	3	Fiesta Bowl
American	Memphis Tigers	12–1	17	Cotton Bowl
Big Ten	Ohio State Buckeyes	13–0	2	Fiesta Bowl
Big 12	Oklahoma Sooners	12–1	4	Peach Bowl
C-USA	Florida Atlantic Owls	10–3	–	Boca Raton Bowl
MAC	Miami (OH) RedHawks	8–5	–	LendingTree Bowl
Mountain West	Boise State Broncos	12–1	18	Las Vegas Bowl
Pac-12	Oregon Ducks	11–2	6	Rose Bowl
SEC	LSU Tigers	13–0	1	Peach Bowl
Sun Belt	Appalachian State Mountaineers	12–1	20	New Orleans Bowl

=== Bowl-eligible teams ===
Generally, a team must have at least six wins to be considered bowl eligible, with at least five of those wins being against FBS opponents. The College Football Playoff semi-final games are determined based on the top four seeds in the playoff committee's final rankings. The remainder of the bowl eligible teams are selected by each respective bowl based on conference tie-ins, order of selection, match-up considerations, and other factors.

However, six teams (Army, East Carolina, Florida, Hawaii, Liberty and Virginia Tech) needed to win seven games to become bowl eligible for the 2019–20 season – Army and Hawaii because their regular season consisted of 13 games, and the other four because they defeated two FCS teams during the season. At season's end, Florida, Hawaii, Liberty, and Virginia Tech were bowl-eligible with at least seven wins each, while Army and East Carolina did not reach the seven win threshold.

- ACC (10): Boston College, Clemson, Florida State, Louisville, Miami (FL), North Carolina, Pittsburgh, Virginia, Virginia Tech, Wake Forest
- American (7): Cincinnati, Memphis, Navy, SMU, Temple, Tulane, UCF
- Big Ten (9): Illinois, Indiana, Iowa, Michigan, Michigan State, Minnesota, Ohio State, Penn State, Wisconsin
- Big 12 (6): Baylor, Iowa State, Kansas State, Oklahoma, Oklahoma State, Texas
- C-USA (8): Charlotte, FIU, Florida Atlantic, Louisiana Tech, Marshall, Southern Miss, UAB, Western Kentucky
- MAC (8): Buffalo, Central Michigan, Eastern Michigan, Kent State, Miami (OH), Ohio, Toledo, Western Michigan
- Mountain West (7): Air Force, Boise State, Hawaii, Nevada, San Diego State, Utah State, Wyoming
- Pac-12 (7): Arizona State, California, Oregon, USC, Utah, Washington, Washington State
- SEC (9): Alabama, Auburn, Florida, Georgia, Kentucky, LSU, Mississippi State, Tennessee, Texas A&M
- Sun Belt (5): Appalachian State, Arkansas State, Georgia Southern, Georgia State, Louisiana
- Independent (3): BYU, Liberty, Notre Dame

Number of bowl berths available: 78
Number of bowl-eligible teams: 79

=== Bowl-eligible teams that did not receive a berth ===
As there were more bowl-eligible teams than there were bowl berths available, one team that was bowl-eligible (Toledo, 6–6) did not receive an invitation.

=== Bowl-ineligible teams ===
- ACC (4): Duke, Georgia Tech, NC State, Syracuse
- American (5): East Carolina, Houston, South Florida, Tulsa, UConn
- Big Ten (5): Maryland, Nebraska, Northwestern, Purdue, Rutgers
- Big 12 (4): Kansas, TCU, Texas Tech, West Virginia
- C-USA (6): Middle Tennessee, North Texas, Old Dominion, Rice, UTEP, UTSA
- MAC (4): Akron, Ball State, Bowling Green, Northern Illinois
- Mountain West (5): Colorado State, Fresno State, New Mexico, San Jose State, UNLV
- Pac-12 (5): Arizona, Colorado, Oregon State, Stanford, (Note: Stanford finished their season bowl-ineligible for the first time since 2008.) UCLA
- SEC (5): Arkansas, Missouri, (Note: In January 2019, Missouri's football program received a one-season postseason ban, due to misconduct by a tutor in completing coursework for student-athletes.) Ole Miss, South Carolina, Vanderbilt
- Sun Belt (5): Coastal Carolina, Louisiana–Monroe, South Alabama, Texas State, Troy
- Independent (3): Army, New Mexico State, UMass

Number of bowl-ineligible teams: 51

== Television ratings ==
=== Non-CFP bowl games ===
Rank	Date	Matchup				Network	Viewers (millions)	TV rating	Game	Location
1	January 1, 2020, 5:00 ET	No. 6 Oregon	28	No. 8 Wisconsin	27	ESPN	16.30	8.7	Rose Bowl	Rose Bowl, Pasadena, CA
2	January 1, 2020, 1:00 ET	No. 14 Michigan	16	No. 13 Alabama	35	ABC	14.00	8.0	Citrus Bowl	Camping World Stadium, Orlando, FL
3	January 1, 2020, 8:30 ET	No. 5 Georgia	26	No. 7 Baylor	14	ESPN	10.22	5.7	Sugar Bowl	Mercedes-Benz Superdome, New Orleans, LA
4	December 28, 2019, 12:00 ET	No. 17 Memphis	39	No. 10 Penn State	53	ESPN	6.22	3.8	Cotton Bowl	AT&T Stadium, Arlington, TX
5	December 30, 2019, 8:00 ET	No. 9 Florida	36	No. 24 Virginia	28	ESPN	6.07	3.5	Orange Bowl	Hard Rock Stadium, Miami Gardens, FL
6	December 31, 2019, 7:30 ET	Texas	38	No. 11 Utah	10	ESPN	5.61	3.1	Alamo Bowl	Alamodome, San Antonio, TX
7	December 27, 2019, 6:45 ET	No. 25 Oklahoma State	21	Texas A&M	24	ESPN	4.90	2.8	Texas Bowl	NRG Stadium, Houston, TX
8	January 2, 2020, 7:00 ET	Indiana	22	Tennessee	23	ESPN	4.32	2.6	Gator Bowl	TIAA Bank Field, Jacksonville, FL
9	December 28, 2019, 12:00 ET	No. 15 Notre Dame	33	Iowa State	9	ABC	4.17	2.7	Camping World Bowl	Camping World Stadium, Orlando, FL
10	January 1, 2020, 1:00 ET	No. 18 Minnesota	31	No. 12 Auburn	24	ESPN	3.99	2.4	Outback Bowl	Raymond James Stadium, Tampa, FL

CFP Rankings.

=== College Football Playoff ===
All times Eastern.

Game	Date	Matchup				Network	Viewers (millions)	TV rating	Location
Peach Bowl (semifinal)	December 28, 2019, 4:00 p.m.	No. 4 Oklahoma	28	No. 1 LSU	63	ESPN	17.2	9.5	Mercedes-Benz Stadium, Atlanta, GA
Fiesta Bowl (semifinal)	December 28, 2019, 8:00 p.m.	No. 3 Clemson	29	No. 2 Ohio State	23	ESPN	21.2	11.1	State Farm Stadium, Glendale, AZ
National Championship	January 13, 2020, 8:00 p.m.	No. 3 Clemson	25	No. 1 LSU	42	ESPN	25.6	14.3	Mercedes-Benz Superdome, New Orleans, LA
