= Antoine Winfield =

Antoine Winfield may refer to:

- Antoine Winfield Sr. (born 1977), American football cornerback
- Antoine Winfield Jr. (born 1998), American football safety
