= 2019 Alamo Bowl =

Postseason college football bowl game

2019 Valero Alamo Bowl
- 27th Alamo Bowl
Utah Utes	Texas Longhorns
(11–2)	(7–5)
Pac-12	Big 12
10	38
Head coach: Kyle Whittingham	Head coach: Tom Herman
AP / Coaches / CFP; 12 / 10 / 11
	1	2	3	4	Total
Utah	0	0	3	7	10
Texas	3	7	14	14	38
- Date: December 31, 2019
- Season: 2019
- Stadium: Alamodome
- Location: San Antonio, Texas
- MVP: Sam Ehlinger (QB, Texas) & Joseph Ossai (LB, Texas)
- Favorite: Utah by 7
- Referee: John McDaid (SEC)
- Attendance: 60,147
- Payout: US$8,252,740

United States TV coverage
- Network: ESPN and ESPN Radio
- Announcers: ESPN: Dave Flemming (play-by-play); Louis Riddick (analyst); Paul Carcaterra (sideline); ESPN Radio: Tom Hart, Jordan Rodgers, Cole Cubelic
- Nielsen ratings: 3.1 (5.61 million viewers)

The 2019 Alamo Bowl was a college football bowl game played on December 31, 2019, with kickoff at 7:30 p.m. EST (6:30 p.m. local CST) on ESPN. It was the 27th edition of the Alamo Bowl, and was one of the 2019–20 bowl games concluding the 2019 FBS football season. Sponsored by Valero Energy, the game was officially known as the Valero Alamo Bowl.

== Teams ==
The game was played between the Utah Utes of the Pac-12 Conference and the Texas Longhorns of the Big 12 Conference. This was second time that the two programs have met; their prior meeting was in 1982, won by Texas.

=== Utah Utes ===
Utah entered the game with an 11–2 record (8–1 in conference), and ranked 12th in the AP Poll. They finished the regular season atop the Pac-12's South Division, having only lost to USC. In the Pac-12 Championship Game, the Utes faced Oregon and were defeated, 37–15. Utah was 1–1 against ranked opponents, defeating Arizona State and losing to Oregon. This was the first appearance for the Utes in the Alamo Bowl.

=== Texas Longhorns ===
Texas entered the game with a 7–5 record (5–4 in conference). They finished in a four-way tie for third place in the Big 12. The Longhorns were 1–3 against ranked opponents; losing to LSU, Oklahoma, and Baylor while defeating Kansas State. This was Texas' fourth Alamo Bowl, tying the Longhorns with Iowa and Oklahoma State for the most appearances. Texas entered the game with a 2–1 record in prior Alamo Bowl appearances.

== Game summary ==
2019 Valero Alamo Bowl

Quarter	1	2	3	4	Total
No. 11 Utah	0	0	3	7	10
Texas	3	7	14	14	38

at Alamodome • San Antonio, Texas

- Date: Tuesday, December 31, 2019
- Game time: 7:30 p.m. EST (6:30 p.m. CST)
- Game weather: n/a (indoors)
- Game attendance: 60,147
- Referee: John McDaid
- TV announcers (ESPN): Dave Flemming (play-by-play), Louis Riddick (analyst) and Paul Carcaterra (sideline)
- ESPN game summary

Game information

First Quarter

- (10:26) TEX – Cameron Dicker 29 yard field goal (Drive: 10 plays, 63 yards, 4:34; Texas 3–0)

Second Quarter

- (13:24) TEX – Sam Ehlinger 5 yard pass to Collin Johnson, Cameron Dicker kick (Drive: 2 plays, 6 yards, 0:43; Texas 10–0)

Third Quarter

- (10:30) TEX – Sam Ehlinger 11 yard pass to Keaontay Ingram, Cameron Dicker kick (Drive: 3 plays, 43 yards, 1:04; Texas 17–0)
- (4:58) UTAH – Jadon Redding 32 yard field goal (Drive: 11 plays, 60 yards, 5:32; Texas 17–3)
- (0:06) TEX – Sam Ehlinger 6 yard rush, Cameron Dicker kick (Drive: 7 plays, 75 yards, 4:52; Texas 24–3)

Fourth Quarter

- (11:34) UTAH – Tyler Huntley 4 yard pass to Demari Simpkins, Jadon Redding kick (Drive: 9 plays, 75 yards, 3:32; Texas 24–10)
- (8:58) TEX – Sam Ehlinger 15 yard pass to Devin Duvernay, Cameron Dicker kick (Drive: 7 plays, 75 yards, 2:36; Texas 31–10)
- (7:54) TEX – Keaontay Ingram 49 yard rush, Cameron Dicker kick (Drive: 1 play, 49 yards, 0:13; Texas 38–10)

=== Statistics ===
Statistics	UTAH	TEX
First downs	15	22
Plays–yards	60–254	56–438
Rushes–yards	37–128	37–231
Passing yards	126	207
Passing: comp–att–int	15–23–0	13–19–1
Time of possession	31:26	28:34

Team	Category	Player	Statistics
Utah	Passing	Tyler Huntley	15/23, 126 yards, 1 TD
Utah	Rushing	Zack Moss	16 carries, 57 yards
Utah	Receiving	Brant Kuithe; Cole Fotheringham (Note: Both Kuithe and Fotheringham finished with the same number of receptions and receiving yards, meaning Utah finished with two leading receivers.)	3 receptions, 30 yards
Texas	Passing	Sam Ehlinger	12/18, 201 yards, 3 TD, 1 INT
Texas	Rushing	Keaontay Ingram	13 carries, 108 yards, 1 TD
Texas	Receiving	Devin Duvernay	3 receptions, 92 yards, 1 TD
