= 2019 Texas Bowl =

Postseason college football bowl game

2019 Academy Sports + Outdoors Texas Bowl
- 14th Texas Bowl
Oklahoma State Cowboys	Texas A&M Aggies
(8–4)	(7–5)
Big 12	SEC
21	24
Head coach: Mike Gundy	Head coach: Jimbo Fisher
AP / Coaches / CFP; 25 / RV / 25
	1	2	3	4	Total
Oklahoma State	14	0	0	7	21
Texas A&M	0	7	7	10	24
- Date: December 27, 2019
- Season: 2019
- Stadium: NRG Stadium
- Location: Houston, Texas
- MVP: Kellen Mond (QB, Texas A&M)
- Favorite: Texas A&M by 4.5
- Referee: Mark Kluczynski (Big Ten)
- Attendance: 68,415
- Payout: US$6,400,000

United States TV coverage
- Network: ESPN & ESPN Radio
- Announcers: ESPN: Kevin Brown (play-by-play), Andre Ware (analyst) and Alyssa Lang (sideline); ESPN Radio: Taylor Zarzour (play-by-play), Matt Stinchcomb (analyst) and Taylor Davis (sideline)

International TV coverage
- Network: ESPN Brasil
- Announcers: Matheus Suman (play-by-play); Weinny Eirado (analyst)

The 2019 Texas Bowl was a college football bowl game played on December 27, 2019, with kickoff at 6:45 p.m. EST (5:45 p.m. local CDT) on ESPN. It was the 14th edition of the Texas Bowl, and was one of the 2019–20 bowl games concluding the 2019 FBS football season. Sponsored by the Academy Sports + Outdoors sporting goods company, the game was officially known as the Academy Sports + Outdoors Texas Bowl.

== Teams ==
The game was played between the Oklahoma State Cowboys from the Big 12 Conference and the Texas A&M Aggies from the Southeastern Conference (SEC). This was the 28th overall meeting between Oklahoma State and Texas A&M; Texas A&M leads the all-time series, 17–10. Both Oklahoma State and Texas A&M were charter members of the Big 12, playing in the conference from 1996 until 2012, when Texas A&M left the Big 12 to join the SEC. Oklahoma State entered the bowl with a four-game win streak against Texas A&M.

=== Oklahoma State Cowboys ===
Oklahoma State entered the game with an 8–4 record (5–4 in conference) and ranked 25th in the AP Poll. The Cowboys finished in a four-way tie for third place in the Big 12. Oklahoma State was 2–3 against ranked teams.

=== Texas A&M Aggies ===
This was Texas A&M's third Texas Bowl, the most appearances of any team. Their 2011 team won that season's Meineke Car Care Bowl of Texas (as the game was then named) over Northwestern, 33–22, and their 2016 team lost that season's Texas Bowl to Kansas State, 33–28. Texas A&M entered the game at 7–5 (4–4 in conference), having finished in fourth place in the SEC's West Division. Texas A&M was 0–5 against ranked teams.

== Game summary ==
2019 Academy Sports + Outdoors Texas Bowl

Quarter	1	2	3	4	Total
No. 25 Oklahoma State	14	0	0	7	21
Texas A&M	0	7	7	10	24

at NRG Stadium • Houston, Texas

- Date: Friday, December 27, 2019
- Game time: 6:45 p.m. EST (5:45 p.m. CST)
- Game weather: n/a (retractable roof closed)
- Game attendance: 68,415
- Referee: Mark Kluczynski
- TV announcers (ESPN): Kevin Brown (play-by-play), Andre Ware (analyst) and Alyssa Lang (sideline)
- ESPN game summary

Game information

First Quarter

- (7:47) OSU – Dru Brown 42 yard pass to Braydon Johnson, Matt Ammendola kick (Drive: 5 plays, 97 yards, 1:57; Oklahoma State 7–0)
- (1:33) OSU – Dru Brown 9 yard rush, Matt Ammendola kick (Drive: 4 plays, 82 yards, 1:48; Oklahoma State 14–0)

Second Quarter

- (5:39) A&M – Isaiah Spiller 1 yard rush, Seth Small kick (Drive: 6 plays, 22 yards, 2:24; Oklahoma State 14–7)

Third Quarter

- (10:32) A&M – Kellen Mond 10 yard pass to Jhamon Ausbon, Seth Small kick (Drive: 7 plays, 60 yards, 3:32; Tied 14–14)

Fourth Quarter

- (10:45) A&M – Kellen Mond 67 yard rush, Seth Small kick (Drive: 3 plays, 88 yards, 1:28; Texas A&M 21–14)
- (2:52) A&M – Seth Small 24 yard field goal (Drive: 9 plays, 59 yards, 5:08; Texas A&M 24–14)
- (1:04) OSU – Dru Brown 5 yard pass to Braydon Johnson, Matt Ammendola kick (Drive: 8 plays, 59 yards, 1:48; Texas A&M 24–21)

=== Statistics ===
Statistics	OSU	A&M
First downs	17	19
Plays–yards	59–334	60–343
Rushes–yards	31–150	41–248
Passing yards	184	95
Passing: comp–att–int	15–28–0	13–19–0
Time of possession	25:47	34:13

Team	Category	Player	Statistics
Oklahoma State	Passing	Dru Brown	15/28, 184 yards, 2 TD
Oklahoma State	Rushing	Chuba Hubbard	19 carries, 158 yards
Oklahoma State	Receiving	Braydon Johnson	5 receptions, 124 yards, 2 TD
Texas A&M	Passing	Kellen Mond	13/19, 95 yards, 1 TD
Texas A&M	Rushing	Kellen Mond	12 carries, 117 yards, 1 TD
Texas A&M	Receiving	Quartney Davis	6 receptions, 48 yards
