= 2020 Outback Bowl =

Postseason college football bowl game

- 34th Outback Bowl
Minnesota Golden Gophers	Auburn Tigers
(10–2)	(9–3)
Big Ten	SEC
31	24
Head coach: P. J. Fleck	Head coach: Gus Malzahn
AP / Coaches / CFP; 16 / 16 / 18	AP / Coaches / CFP; 9 / 13 / 12
	1	2	3	4	Total
Minnesota	10	14	0	7	31
Auburn	10	7	7	0	24
- Date: January 1, 2020
- Season: 2019
- Stadium: Raymond James Stadium
- Location: Tampa, Florida
- MVP: Tyler Johnson (WR, Minnesota)
- Favorite: Auburn by 7
- Referee: Duane Heydt (ACC)
- Attendance: 45,652
- Payout: US$6,400,000

United States TV coverage
- Network: ESPN
- Announcers: Jason Benetti (play-by-play); Rod Gilmore (analyst); Quint Kessenich (sideline)

The 2020 Outback Bowl was a college football bowl game played on January 1, 2020, with kickoff at 1:00 p.m. EST on ESPN. It was the 34th edition of the Outback Bowl, and was one of the 2019–20 bowl games concluding the 2019 FBS football season. The game was named after its title sponsor, Outback Steakhouse.

== Teams ==
The game matched the Minnesota Golden Gophers from the Big Ten Conference and the Auburn Tigers from the Southeastern Conference (SEC). This was the first meeting between the programs.

=== Minnesota Golden Gophers ===
Minnesota entered the game with a 10–2 record (7–2 in conference). They finished tied with Wisconsin atop the Big Ten's West Division—Wisconsin advanced to the Big Ten Championship Game due to their regular season win over Minnesota. The Golden Gophers were 1–2 against ranked FBS opponents, defeating Penn State while losing to Iowa and Wisconsin. This was Minnesota's first appearance in the Outback Bowl.

=== Auburn Tigers ===
Auburn entered the game with a 9–3 record (5–3 in conference). They finished in third place in the SEC's West Division. The Tigers were 3–3 against ranked FBS opponents, defeating Oregon, Texas A&M, and Alabama while losing to Florida, LSU, and Georgia. This was Auburn's fifth Outback Bowl; the Tigers were 2–2 in their previous appearances.

== Game summary ==
2020 Outback Bowl

Quarter	1	2	3	4	Total
No. 18 Minnesota	10	14	0	7	31
No. 12 Auburn	10	7	7	0	24

at Raymond James Stadium • Tampa, Florida

- Date: Wednesday, January 1, 2020
- Game time: 1:00 p.m. EST
- Game weather: Fair • Temperature: 68 °F (20 °C) • Wind: 3 mph
- Game attendance: 45,652
- Referee: Duane Heydt
- TV announcers (ESPN): Jason Benetti (play-by-play), Rod Gilmore (analyst) and Quint Kessenich (sideline)
- ESPN game summary

Game information

First Quarter

- (12:17) AUB – Anders Carlson 24 yard field goal (Drive: 4 plays, 6 yards, 1:13; Auburn 3–0)
- (6:36) MINN – Michael Lantz 40 yard field goal (Drive: 10 plays, 53 yards, 5:41; Tied 3–3)
- (6:23) AUB – Noah Igbinoghene 96 yard kickoff return, Anders Carlson kick (Auburn 10–3)
- (4:05) MINN – Mohamed Ibrahim 16 yard rush, Michael Lantz kick (Drive: 3 plays, 40 yards, 1:14; Tied 10–10)

Second Quarter

- (7:09) MINN – Seth Green 1 yard pass to Bryce Witham, Michael Lantz kick (Drive: 12 plays, 92 yards, 5:52; Minnesota 17–10)
- (4:15) AUB – Bo Nix 37 yard pass to Sal Cannella, Anders Carlson kick (Drive: 7 plays, 69 yards, 2:54; Tied 17–17)
- (0:32) MINN – Tanner Morgan 2 yard pass to Tyler Johnson, Michael Lantz kick (Drive: 9 plays, 75 yards, 3:43; Minnesota 24–17)

Third Quarter

- (5:04) AUB – JaTarvious Whitlow 3 yard rush, Anders Carlson kick (Drive: 13 plays, 86 yards, 5:15; Tied 24–24)

Fourth Quarter

- (10:26) MINN – Tanner Morgan 73 yard pass to Tyler Johnson, Michael Lantz kick (Drive: 1 play, 73 yards, 0:11; Minnesota 31–24)

=== Statistics ===
Statistics	MINN	AUB
First downs	23	13
Plays–yards	75–494	53–232
Rushes–yards	45–215	26–56
Passing yards	279	176
Passing: comp–att–int	20–30–1	17–27–0
Time of possession	37:35	22:25

Team	Category	Player	Statistics
Minnesota	Passing	Tanner Morgan	19/29, 278 yards, 2 TD, 1 INT
Minnesota	Rushing	Mohamed Ibrahim	20 carries, 140 yards, 1 TD
Minnesota	Receiving	Tyler Johnson	12 receptions, 204 yards, 2 TD
Auburn	Passing	Bo Nix	17/26, 176 yards, 1 TD
Auburn	Rushing	JaTarvious Whitlow	9 carries, 24 yards, 1 TD
Auburn	Receiving	Anthony Schwartz	6 receptions, 49 yards
