= Antoine Winfield Jr. =

American football player (born 1998)

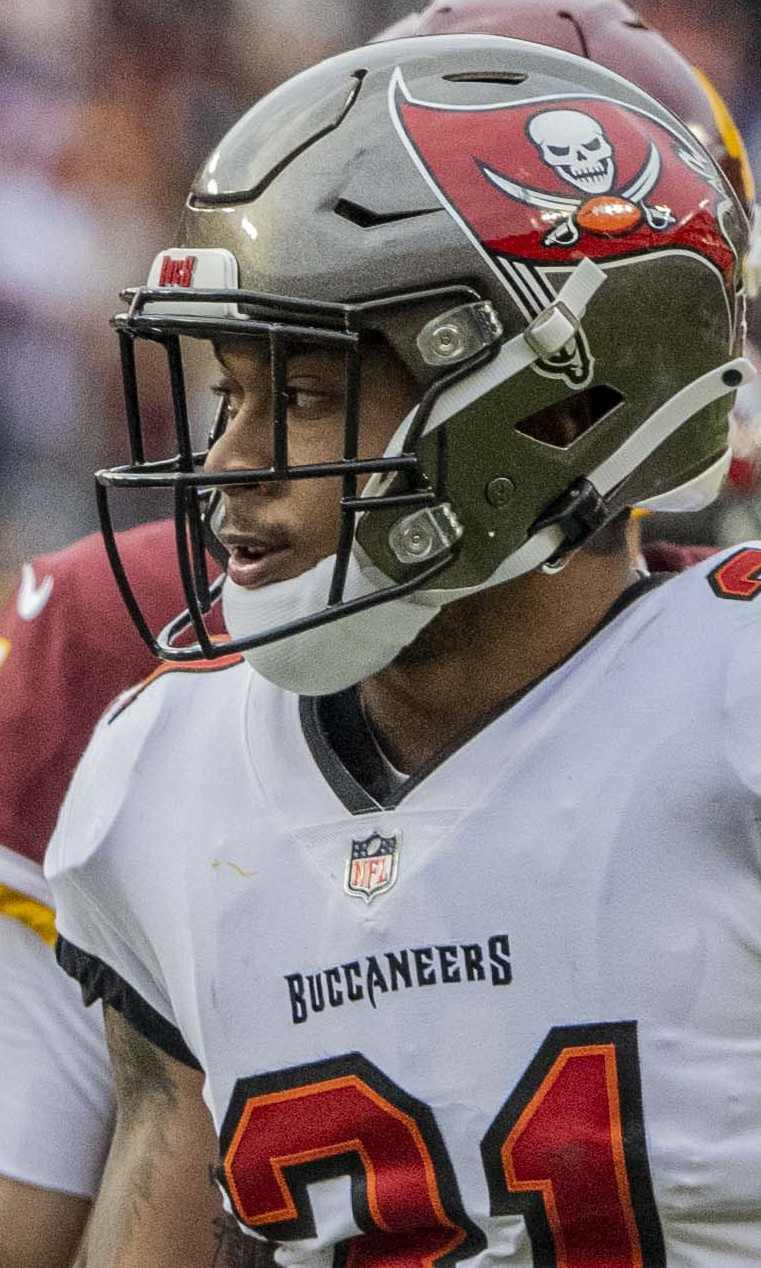
- Winfield Jr. with the Tampa Bay Buccaneers in 2021

No. 31 – Tampa Bay Buccaneers
- Position: Safety
- Roster status: Active

Personal information
- Born: August 16, 1998 (age 28); Columbus, Ohio, U.S.
- Listed height: 5 ft 9 in (1.75 m)
- Listed weight: 203 lb (92 kg)

Career information
- High school: The Woodlands (The Woodlands, Texas)
- College: Minnesota (2016–2019)
- NFL draft: 2020: 2nd round, 45th overall pick

Career history
- Tampa Bay Buccaneers (2020–present)

Awards and highlights
- Super Bowl champion (LV); First-team All-Pro (2023); 2× Pro Bowl (2021, 2025); NFL forced fumbles co-leader (2023); PFWA All-Rookie Team (2020); Unanimous All-American (2019); Big Ten Defensive Back of the Year (2019); First-team All-Big Ten (2019)

Career NFL statistics as of Week 9, 2026
- Total tackles: 572
- Interceptions: 9
- Interception return yards: 94
- Pass deflections: 39
- Forced fumbles: 12
- Fumble recoveries: 10
- Sacks: 18.0
- Defensive touchdowns: 1
- Stats at Pro Football Reference

Antoine Duane Winfield Jr. (born August 16, 1998) is an American professional football safety for the Tampa Bay Buccaneers of the National Football League (NFL). He played college football for the Minnesota Golden Gophers, earning unanimous All-American honors and winning Big Ten Defensive Back of the Year in 2019. Winfield was selected by the Buccaneers in the second round of the 2020 NFL draft. With Tampa Bay, Winfield has received two Pro Bowl selections and was named a first-team All-Pro in 2023 after leading the league in forced fumbles. He was also a member of the team that won Super Bowl LV.

== Early life ==
Winfield Jr. attended Eden Prairie High School in Eden Prairie, Minnesota for his freshman year before he and his family moved to The Woodlands, Texas and attended The Woodlands High School, where he was a three-year letterer and two-year starting safety, in addition to being the team's kick returner, playing alongside future NFL players Ethan Bonner and Patrick Carr. As a senior, he totaled 87 tackles, five forced fumbles, and one interception, and was named the Montgomery County Player of the Year. Winfield was considered a two-star recruit by Rivals.com, and accepted a scholarship from Minnesota over offers from Baylor, Eastern Michigan, Houston, Lamar, Missouri, South Florida, Texas State, and Wyoming, among others.

== College career ==
As a true freshman at Minnesota in 2016, Winfield Jr. played in 12 games and made nine starts. During the season, he had 52 tackles, one interception and one fumble recovered for a touchdown. He played in the first four games in 2017 before suffering an injury that caused him to miss the rest of the season. He finished the season with 20 tackles and a sack. Winfield Jr. again played in only four games in 2018, recording 17 tackles and an interception. He returned from the injuries in 2019 and was named a finalist for the Bronko Nagurski Trophy. In the 2019 season, his seven interceptions led the Big Ten Conference. After being named a first-team All American and Big Ten Defensive Back of the Year during the 2019 season, Winfield announced that he would forgo his final two years of eligibility and declared for the 2020 NFL draft.

== Professional career ==
=== Pre-draft ===
ESPN analyst Mel Kiper Jr. listed Winfield as the top safety prospect in the draft. NFL media analyst Daniel Jeremiah had Winfield ranked as the third best safety prospect (49th overall). Pro Football Focus, NFL analyst Bucky Brooks, and Kevin Hanson of Sports Illustrated had him ranked as the fourth best safety in the draft. Former NFL executive Gil Brandt ranked Winfield fourth among all safeties (56th overall) available in the draft. Dane Brugler of the Athletic ranked him sixth amongst all safety prospects in the draft. NFL draft analysts projected him to be selected in the second round of the 2020 NFL draft.

External videos
- Antoine Winfield runs 4.45s 40-yard dash
- Antoine Winfield: 2020 Combine Workout

Pre-draft measurables
Height	Weight	Arm length	Hand span	Wingspan	40-yard dash	10-yard split	20-yard split	Vertical jump	Broad jump	Wonderlic
5 ft 9 1/8 in (1.76 m)	203 lb (92 kg)	30 1/8 in (0.77 m)	9 1/2 in (0.24 m)	6 ft 0 3/4 in (1.85 m)	4.45 s	1.52 s	2.62 s	36.0 in (0.91 m)	10 ft 4 in (3.15 m)	20
All values from NFL Combine

=== 2020 ===
The Tampa Bay Buccaneers selected Winfield in the second round (45th overall) of the 2020 NFL draft. He was the fourth safety selected in 2020 and also became the first of six defensive backs from Minnesota's 2019 secondary that would be drafted from 2020 to 2024. Winfield was followed by Chris Williamson (2020), Benjamin St-Juste (2021), Terell Smith (2023), Jordan Howden (2023), and Tyler Nubin (2024).

External videos
- Bucs select Antoine Winfield Jr. No. 45
- Winfield's family erupts when Bucs select him
- Antoine Winfield's college highlights

On July 29, 2020, the Tampa Bay Buccaneers signed Winfield to a four–year, $7.30 million contract that includes $3.81 million guaranteed and a signing bonus of $2.87 million.

Throughout training camp, he competed to be a starting safety against veterans Mike Edwards and Jordan Whitehead. Head coach Bruce Arians named Winfield the starting strong safety to begin the regular season and paired him with free safety Jordan Whitehead.

On September 13, 2020, Winfield made his professional regular season debut and earned his first career start in the Tampa Bay Buccaneers' season-opener at the New Orleans Saints and made six combined tackles (three solo) and a pass deflection during a 34–23 loss. In Week 2, he had 11 combined tackles (eight solo) and forced a fumble by Teddy Bridgewater while making his first career sack during a 31–17 victory against the Carolina Panthers. He was named the NFL Defensive Rookie of the Month for September (23 total tackles, two pass deflections, two sacks, and a forced fumble from Weeks 1–3). On October 25, 2020, Winfield made two combined tackles (one solo), a pass deflection, and had his first career interception after a pass by Derek Carr to wide receiver Nelson Agholor was broken up by safety Mike Edwards and caught by Winfield during the fourth quarter of a 45–20 win at the Las Vegas Raiders. In Week 14, Winfield led the team with a season-high 12 combined tackles (ten solo) and had a sack on Kirk Cousins during a 26–14 win against the Minnesota Vikings. He was named to the PFWA All-Rookie Team. He started all 16 games as a rookie and finished with a total of 94 combined tackles (64 solo), six pass deflections, three sacks, two forced fumbles, one fumble recovery, and one interception while starting all 16 games. Pro Football Focus had him finish the season with an overall grade of 56.2 as a rookie in 2020.

The Tampa Bay Buccaneers finished the 2020 NFL season second in the NFC South with an 11–5 record to earn a Wildcard spot. On January 9, 2021, Winfield started in the first playoff game of his career and recorded six solo tackles during a 31–23 victory at the Washington Football Team in the Wild Card Game. On January 17, 2021, Winfield had six combined tackles (five solo) and forced a fumble by tight end Jared Cook that was recovered by Devin White as the Buccaneers earned a 30–20 victory at the New Orleans Saints in the Divisional Round. During practice prior to the National Football Conference (NFC) Championship Winfield sustained an ankle injury and was subsequently inactive as the Buccaneers defeated the Green Bay Packers 31–26.

==== Super Bowl LV ====
On February 7, 2021, Winfield returned from injury and started in Super Bowl LV, recording six combined tackles (four solo) and intercepted a pass thrown by Patrick Mahomes to wide receiver Tyreek Hill as the Tampa Bay Buccaneers defeated the Kansas City Chiefs 31–9 to earn Winfield his first Super Bowl ring. Winfield was penalized for unsportsmanlike conduct near the end of the game for taunting Hill after Hill taunted him earlier in the season. He was also fined $7,815 by the NFL, prompting him and the Buccaneers to each donate the same amount to the team's Youth Leadership Program at Young Middle Magnet School in Tampa.

=== 2021 ===
He entered training camp with the Buccaneers in 2021 slated as the de facto starting strong safety under defensive coordinator Todd Bowles. Head coach Bruce Arians retained Winfield and Jordan Whitehead as the starting safeties to begin the season. On October 3, 2021, Winfield made seven combined tackles (five solo), forced a fumble, made a pass deflection, and intercepted a pass thrown by Mac Jones to wide receiver Nelson Agholor before exiting at the end of the fourth quarter of a 19–17 victory at the New England Patriots due to possibly suffering a concussion. He was confirmed to have suffered a concussion and would remain inactive for the next two games (Weeks 5–6) while in concussion protocol. In Week 10, he set a season-high with 11 combined tackles (seven solo) and forced a fumble during a 19–29 loss at the Washington Football Team. He was inactive for another two games (Weeks 15–16) after sustaining a lisfranc sprain. He finished the 2021 NFL season with 88 combined tackles (62 solo), two sacks, six pass deflections, two interceptions, two forced fumbles, and three fumble recoveries in 13 games and starts. He received an overall grade of 89.1 from Pro Football Focus.

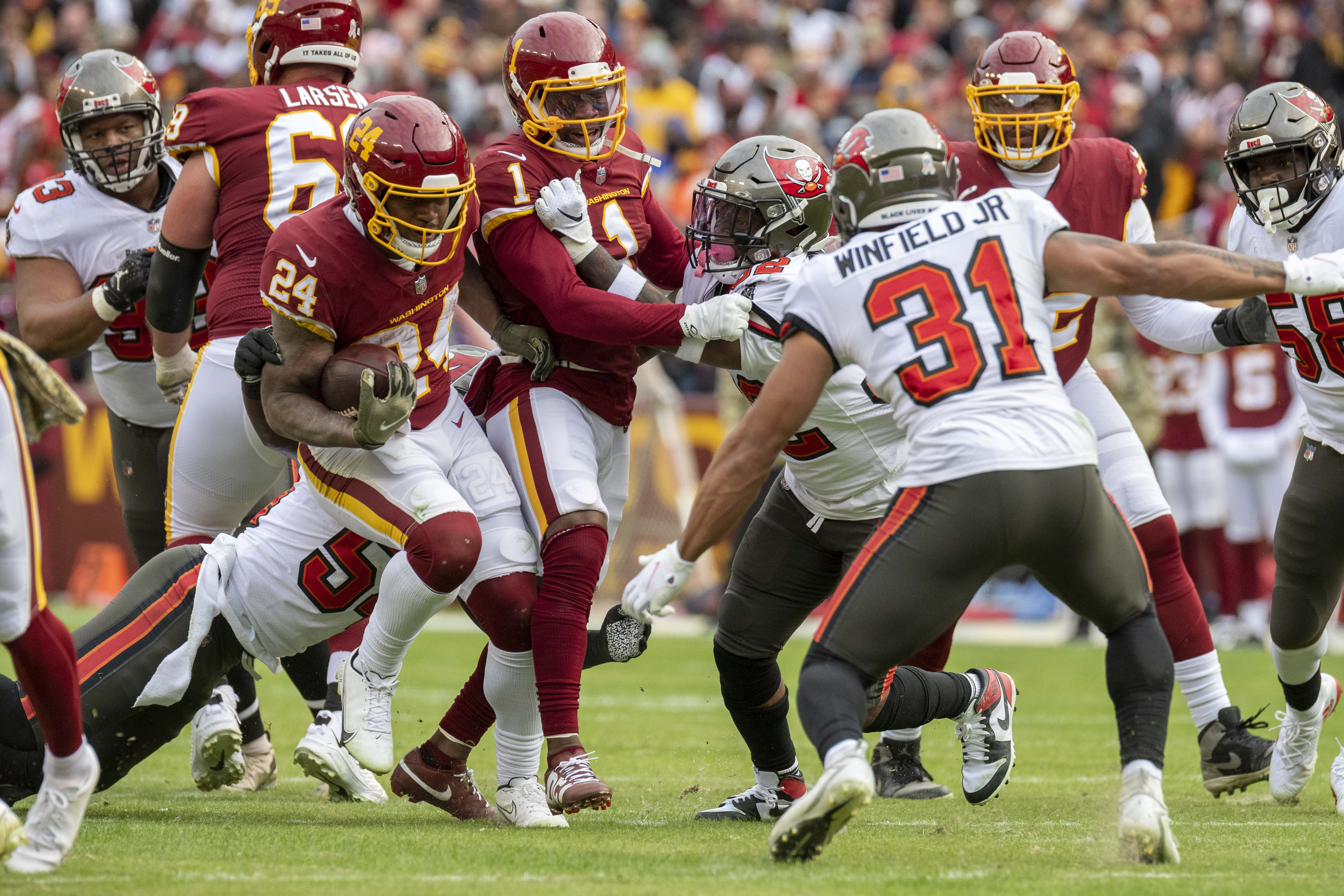
Winfield Jr. (right) playing against the Washington Football Team in 2021.

The Tampa Bay Buccaneers finished the 2021 NFL season with a 13–4 record and clinched a playoff berth atop the NFC South. On January 16, 2022, Winfield recorded five combined tackles (three solo) and a sack on Jalen Hurts during a 31–15 victory against the Philadelphia Eagles in the Wild Card Game. On January 23, 2022, Winfield recorded nine total tackles and a forced fumble, but gave up a key 44-yard reception to Rams wide receiver Cooper Kupp late in the fourth quarter which put Rams kicker Matt Gay in range to convert a game winning 30-yard field goal, as the Rams defeated the Buccaneers 30–27 to eliminate them from the playoffs during the Divisional Round.

On January 26, 2022, Winfield earned his first career Pro Bowl selection after being named as an injury replacement for Seattle Seahawks safety Quandre Diggs. He was ranked 75th by his fellow players on the NFL Top 100 Players of 2022.

=== 2022 ===
On March 30, 2022, the Tampa Bay Buccaneers promoted defensive coordinator Todd Bowles to head coach after Bruce Arians retired and shifted to a senior football consultant role. He continued to retain Winfield as the starting strong safety and paired him with Mike Edwards, following the departure of Jordan Whitehead.

On September 11, 2022, Winfield started in the Tampa Bay Buccaneers' season-opener at the Dallas Cowboys and made six combined tackles (five solo), one pass deflection, and intercepted a pass thrown by Dak Prescott to wide receiver Noah Brown during a 19–3 victory. On October 23, 2022, Winfield made two solo tackles before exiting during the third quarter of a 3–21 loss at the Carolina Panthers to be evaluated for a possible concussion after colliding with running back Raheem Blackshear while tackling him for a four–yard loss. He was confirmed to have suffered a concussion and remained inactive for the next two games (Weeks 8–9). He injured his ankle and was subsequently sidelined for another two games (Weeks 13–14). In Week 14, Winfield set a new season-high with 13 combined tackles (ten solo) as the Buccaneers 17–30 lost at the Atlanta Falcons. He completed the 2022 NFL season with 80 combined tackles (64 solo), a career-high four sacks, one interception, three passes defended, and one forced fumble in 13 games and 13 starts. He finished the season with an overall grade of 78.1 from Pro Football Focus in 2022.

=== 2023 ===
He returned to training camp with the Tampa Bay Buccaneers slated as the de facto starting free safety following the departure of Mike Edwards. Head coach Todd Bowles named Winfield a starting safety to begin the season and paired him with Ryan Neal.

In Week 10, Winfield had six combined tackles (three solo), one pass deflection, and intercepted a pass by Will Levis to wide receiver DeAndre Hopkins during a 20–6 victory against the Tennessee Titans. On November 19, 2023, Winfield set a career-high with 16 combined tackles (ten solo) during a 27–14 loss at the San Francisco 49ers. On December 3, 2023, Winfield made eight combined tackles (six solo), set a career-high with three pass deflections, made one sack, and secured a 21–18 win over the Carolina Panthers by intercepting a pass by Bryce Young to wide receiver Adam Thielen with only 2:21 remaining in the fourth quarter. His performance earned him NFC Defensive Player of the Week. In Week 16, he had three solo tackles, one pass deflection, a sack, and set a new career-high with his third interception of the season on a pass by Trevor Lawrence to tight end Evan Engram during a 30–12 win against the Jacksonville Jaguars. In Week 18, he recorded five combined tackles (four solo), made one sack, and had a touchdown-saving forced fumble in a 9–0 win over the Carolina Panthers to earn his second Player of the Week award of the season. He started all 16 games during the 2023 NFL season and finished with a career-high 122 combined tackles (76 solo), set a career-high with six sacks, set a new career-high with three interceptions, made 12 pass deflections, had six forced fumbles, and four fumble recoveries. He earned first team All-Pro honors for the first time. He was the highest graded safety by Pro Football Focus in 2023 with an overall grade of 90.7. He was ranked 46th by his fellow players on the NFL Top 100 Players of 2024.

=== 2024 ===
On March 5, 2024, the Tampa Bay Buccaneers placed the franchise tag on Winfield that was an offer of one–year, $17.12 million. On May 13, 2024, the Tampa Bay Buccaneers signed Winfield to a four–year, $84.10 million contract extension that includes $45 million guaranteed upon signing and an initial signing bonus of $20 million, making him the highest paid defensive back in league history.

He entered training camp slated to remain as the Buccaneers' de facto starting free safety. Head coach Todd Bowles chose named him the starting free safety to begin the season and paired him with strong safety Jordan Whitehead.

On September 8, 2024, Winfield started in the Buccaneers' home-opener against the Washington Commanders and had seven combined tackles (four solo) before exiting at the end of the fourth quarter of their 37–20 victory after injuring his foot. It was confirmed that Winfield had injured his ankle and remained inactive for the next four games (Weeks 2–5). On October 13, 2024, Winfield returned from his injury and made four solo tackles while also scoring his first career touchdown when Tykee Smith and Zyon McCollum forced a fumble by wide receiver Chris Olave, which led to a fumble recovery by Winfield that he returned 58–yards return by Winfield during a 51–27 victory at the New Orleans Saints. In Week 9, he collected a season-high 12 combined tackles (five solo) during a 30–24 loss at the Kansas City Chiefs. After injuring his ankle, Winfield would subsequently miss the last four games (Weeks 15–18) of the 2024 NFL season. He ended the season with a total of 60 combined tackles (34 solo), three pass deflections, two sacks, one fumble recovery, and a touchdown in nine games and nine starts. He received an overall grade of 56.8 from Pro Football Focus, which ranked 126th among 171 qualifying safeties in 2024.

=== 2025 ===
In the 2025 season, Winfield Jr. had 93 total tackles (53 solo), one sack, two interceptions, eight passes defended, one forced fumble, and one fumble recovery. He earned Pro Bowl honors for the second time in his career.

== Career statistics ==
Legend
	Won the Super Bowl
	Led the league
**Bold**	Career high

=== NFL ===
==== Regular season ====
Year	Team	Games		Tackles					Interceptions						Fumbles			
Year	Team	GP	GS	Cmb	Solo	Ast	Sck	TFL	PD	Int	Yds	Avg	Lng	TD	FF	FR	Yds	TD
2020	TB	16	16	94	64	30	3.0	1	6	1	16	**16.0**	16	0	2	1	0	0
2021	TB	13	13	88	62	26	2.0	4	6	2	**30**	15.0	**30**	0	2	3	9	0
2022	TB	13	13	80	64	16	4.0	**7**	3	1	15	15.0	15	0	1	0	0	0
2023	TB	17	17	**122**	**76**	**46**	**6.0**	6	**12**	**3**	28	9.3	28	0	**6**	**4**	5	0
2024	TB	9	9	60	34	26	2.0	2	3	0	0	0.0	0	0	0	1	**58**	**1**
2025	TB	17	17	93	53	40	1.0	4	8	2	5	2.5	5	0	1	1	0	0
2026	TB	6	6	35	22	13	0.0	0	1	0	0	0.0	0	0	0	0	0	0
Total		91	91	572	375	197	18.0	24	39	9	94	10.4	30	0	12	10	72	1

==== Postseason ====
Year	Team	Games		Tackles					Interceptions						Fumbles			
Year	Team	GP	GS	Cmb	Solo	Ast	Sck	TFL	PD	Int	Yds	Avg	Lng	TD	FF	FR	Yds	TD
2020	TB	3	3	**18**	**15**	3	0.0	**2**	**2**	**1**	0	0.0	0	0	**1**	0	0	0
2021	TB	2	2	14	11	3	**1.0**	1	0	0	0	0.0	0	0	**1**	**1**	0	0
2022	TB	1	1	7	4	3	0.0	0	0	0	0	0.0	0	0	0	0	0	0
2023	TB	2	2	5	4	1	0.0	0	1	0	0	0.0	0	0	0	0	0	0
2024	TB	1	1	7	3	**4**	0.0	0	0	0	0	0.0	0	0	0	0	0	0
Total		9	9	51	37	14	1.0	3	3	1	0	0.0	0	0	2	1	0	0

=== College ===
Season	Team	GP	Tackles					Interceptions				Fumbles	
Season	Team	GP	Cmb	Solo	Ast	TfL	Sck	PD	Int	Yds	TD	FF	FR
2016	Minnesota	10	52	37	15	2.5	0.0	**3**	1	82	**1**	0	**2**
2017	Minnesota	4	20	17	3	1.0	1.0	2	0	0	0	0	0
2018	Minnesota	4	17	10	7	0.0	0.0	0	1	0	0	0	1
2019	Minnesota	12	**83**	**58**	**25**	**3.5**	**3.0**	1	**7**	**98**	**1**	**2**	0
Career		30	172	122	50	7.0	4.0	6	9	180	2	2	3

== Personal life ==
Winfield's father, Antoine Sr., played in the NFL for 14 seasons with the Buffalo Bills and the Minnesota Vikings. Antoine Jr., was born in Columbus, Ohio while his father attended Ohio State University. His mother, Erniece Winfield, also attended Ohio State.

== See also ==
- List of second-generation National Football League players
