= 2019 Minnesota Golden Gophers football team =

American college football season

2019 Minnesota Golden Gophers football

Big Ten West Division co-champion Outback Bowl champion

Outback Bowl, W 31–24 vs. Auburn
- Conference: Big Ten Conference
- West Division

Ranking
- Coaches: No. 10
- AP: No. 10
- Record: 11–2 (7–2 Big Ten)
- Head coach: P. J. Fleck (3rd season)
- Offensive coordinator: Kirk Ciarrocca (3rd season)
- Offensive scheme: Spread
- Defensive coordinator: Joe Rossi (2nd season)
- Base defense: 4–3
- Home stadium: TCF Bank Stadium

Uniform
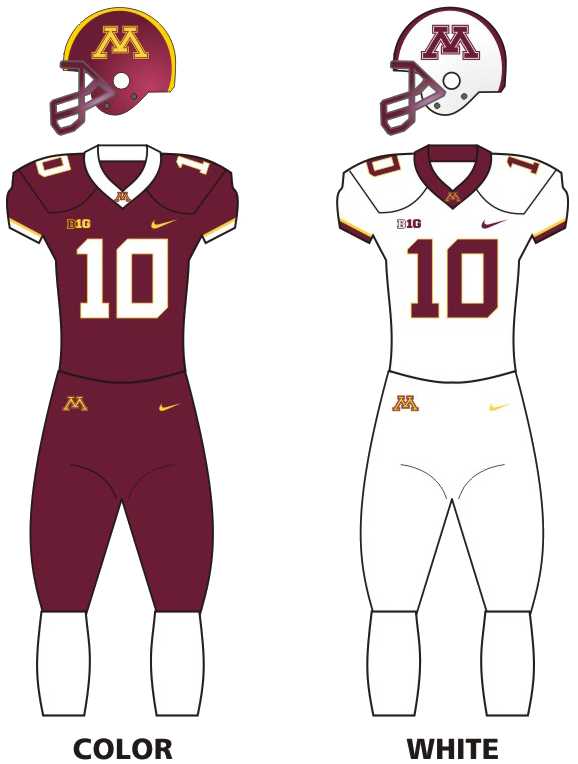

2019 Big Ten Conference football standings
	Conf.			Overall
Team	W		L	W		L
East Division
No. 3 Ohio State xy$^	9	–	0	13	–	1
No. 9 Penn State	7	–	2	11	–	2
No. 18 Michigan	6	–	3	9	–	4
Indiana	5	–	4	8	–	5
Michigan State	4	–	5	7	–	6
Maryland	1	–	8	3	–	9
Rutgers	0	–	9	2	–	10
West Division
No. 11 Wisconsin xy	7	–	2	10	–	4
No. 10 Minnesota x	7	–	2	11	–	2
No. 15 Iowa	6	–	3	10	–	3
Illinois	4	–	5	6	–	7
Purdue	3	–	6	4	–	8
Nebraska	3	–	6	5	–	7
Northwestern	1	–	8	3	–	9
Championship: Ohio State 34, Wisconsin 21
^ – College Football Playoff participant; $ – Conference champion; x – Division champion/co-champions; y – Championship game participant; Rankings from AP Poll

The 2019 Minnesota Golden Gophers football team represented the University of Minnesota in the 2019 NCAA Division I FBS football season. The Golden Gophers played their home games at TCF Bank Stadium in Minneapolis, Minnesota, and competed in the West Division of the Big Ten Conference. They were led by third-year head coach P. J. Fleck.

Minnesota was projected to finish in sixth place in the Big Ten West Division by the preseason media poll. Instead, Minnesota had its most successful season in over 50 years. The Gophers won their first nine games of the year, punctuated with a home win over then-No. 4 Penn State, and rose to eighth in the College Football Playoff rankings. They suffered their first loss of the year the next week on the road against Iowa. In the final game of the regular season, in a game that decided the West Division, Minnesota lost to rival Wisconsin, 38–17. The team was invited to the Outback Bowl to play then-No. 12 Auburn, where Minnesota won by a score of 31–24. Minnesota ended the season with a record of 11–2, their 11 wins being the school's most since 1904. They were ranked 10th in the final AP Poll of the season, their first ranked finish since 2003, and highest finish since 1962.

The Gophers' offense was led by redshirt sophomore quarterback Tanner Morgan, who had 3,253 passing yards and 30 touchdowns, and was named second-team All-Big Ten. Wide receivers Rashod Bateman and Tyler Johnson both finished with more than 1,200 yards and were both named first-team all-conference. Running back Rodney Smith finished in third in the conference with 1,163 yards. The defense was led by unanimous All-American safety Antoine Winfield Jr., who led the team in tackles and had seven interceptions on the year. Head coach P. J. Fleck was named the Big Ten Coach of the Year by the other coaches.

== Preseason ==
=== Preseason Big Ten poll ===
Although the Big Ten Conference has not held an official preseason poll since 2010, Cleveland.com has polled sports journalists representing all member schools as a de facto preseason media poll since 2011. For the 2019 poll, Minnesota was projected to finish in sixth in the West Division.

== Schedule ==
Date	Time	Opponent	Rank	Site	TV	Result	Attendance	Source
August 29	8:00 p.m.	No. 3 (FCS) South Dakota State*		TCF Bank Stadium; Minneapolis, MN	FS1	W 28–21	49,112	
September 7	9:30 p.m.	at Fresno State*		Bulldog Stadium; Fresno, CA	CBSSN	W 38–35 ^{2OT}	34,790	
September 14	2:30 p.m.	Georgia Southern*		TCF Bank Stadium; Minneapolis, MN	BTN	W 35–32	41,021	
September 28	2:30 p.m.	at Purdue		Ross-Ade Stadium; West Lafayette, IN	ESPN2	W 38–31	50,629	
October 5	2:30 p.m.	Illinois^{†}		TCF Bank Stadium; Minneapolis, MN	BTN	W 40–17	39,341	
October 12	6:30 p.m.	Nebraska		TCF Bank Stadium; Minneapolis, MN (rivalry)	FS1	W 34–7	43,502	
October 19	2:30 p.m.	at Rutgers	No. 20	SHI Stadium; Piscataway, NJ	BTN	W 42–7	26,429	
October 26	2:30 p.m.	Maryland	No. 17	TCF Bank Stadium; Minneapolis, MN	ESPN	W 52–10	44,715	
November 9	11:00 a.m.	No. 4 Penn State	No. 17	TCF Bank Stadium; Minneapolis, MN (Governor's Victory Bell)	ABC	W 31–26	51,883	
November 16	3:00 p.m.	at No. 20 Iowa	No. 8	Kinnick Stadium; Iowa City, IA (Floyd of Rosedale)	FOX	L 19–23	67,518	
November 23	11:00 a.m.	at Northwestern	No. 10	Ryan Field; Evanston, IL	ABC	W 38–22	30,246	
November 30	2:30 p.m.	No. 12 Wisconsin	No. 8	TCF Bank Stadium; Minneapolis, MN (Paul Bunyan's Axe, College GameDay)	ABC	L 17–38	53,756	
January 1, 2020	12:00 p.m.	vs. No. 12 Auburn*	No. 18	Raymond James Stadium; Tampa, FL (Outback Bowl)	ESPN	W 31–24	45,652	
*Non-conference game; ^{†}Homecoming; Rankings from AP Poll and CFP Rankings (after November 5) released prior to game; All times are in Central time

== Rankings ==
Ranking movements Legend: ██ Increase in ranking ██ Decrease in ranking RV = Received votes
	Week																
Poll	Pre	1	2	3	4	5	6	7	8	9	10	11	12	13	14	15	Final
AP	RV	RV	RV	RV	RV	RV	RV	20	17	13	13	7	11	9	15	16	10
Coaches	RV	RV	RV	RV	RV	RV	25	20	16	13	13	7	11	9	15	16	10
CFP	Not released										17	8	10	8	18	18	Not released

== Game summaries ==
=== South Dakota State ===
	1	2	3	4	Total
No. 3 (FCS) Jackrabbits	0	7	14	0	21
Golden Gophers	0	13	7	8	28

Down 1, the Gophers won the game with a short TD run by Mohamed Ibrahim and a two point conversion late in the 4th Quarter to win 28–21.

=== At Fresno State ===
	1	2	3	4	OT	2OT	Total
Golden Gophers	7	7	0	14	7	3	38
Bulldogs	0	10	11	7	7	0	35

=== Georgia Southern ===
	1	2	3	4	Total
Eagles	10	10	0	12	32
Golden Gophers	14	7	0	14	35

=== At Purdue ===
	1	2	3	4	Total
Golden Gophers	14	14	10	0	38
Boilermakers	3	7	7	14	31

=== Illinois ===
	1	2	3	4	Total
Fighting Illini	7	3	7	0	17
Golden Gophers	3	13	14	10	40

=== Nebraska ===
	1	2	3	4	Total
Cornhuskers	0	0	0	7	7
Golden Gophers	7	7	20	0	34

=== At Rutgers ===
	1	2	3	4	Total
No. 20 Golden Gophers	7	7	7	21	42
Scarlet Knights	0	0	0	7	7

=== Maryland ===
	1	2	3	4	Total
Terrapins	0	3	0	7	10
No. 17 Golden Gophers	14	14	10	14	52

=== Penn State ===
	1	2	3	4	Total
No. 4 Nittany Lions	10	3	6	7	26
No. 17 Golden Gophers	14	10	0	7	31

=== At Iowa ===
	1	2	3	4	Total
No. 8 Golden Gophers	0	6	7	6	19
No. 20 Hawkeyes	13	7	0	3	23

=== At Northwestern ===
	1	2	3	4	Total
No. 10 Golden Gophers	14	7	7	10	38
Wildcats	0	9	7	6	22

=== Wisconsin ===
	1	2	3	4	Total
No. 12 Badgers	0	10	14	14	38
No. 8 Golden Gophers	7	0	3	7	17

=== Vs. Auburn (Outback Bowl) ===
	1	2	3	4	Total
No. 18 Golden Gophers	10	14	0	7	31
No. 12 Tigers	10	7	7	0	24

Despite losing an opportunity to go to the BIG 10 Championship and a shot at the Rose Bowl, the Gophers would earn a spot in the Outback Bowl on New Year's Day against the Auburn Tigers, the first ever meeting between the two teams. The game would be played at Raymond James Stadium in Tampa Bay, Florida. Auburn had impressive victories in their season, beating the Pac-12 champion Oregon Ducks in Texas to open the season and more recently knocking off the Alabama Crimson Tide in the Iron Bowl. The game was a back and forth affair with both teams trading field goals then touchdowns to make it 10–10 after the 1st Quarter. The lone Gopher 1st quarter touchdown came from Mohamed Ibrahim on a 16 yard TD run. About midway through the second, Seth Green found offensive lineman Bryce Witham in the end zone to give the Gophers a 17–10 lead, their first lead of the game. After Bo Nix connected with Sal Cannella for a 37 yard score, the Gophers would end the half with a drive that ultimately ended with an impressive Tyler Johnson touchdown reception to give them a 24–17 lead. Auburn would score the only points of the 3rd Quarter as Jordan Whitlow ran a touchdown in from three yards out. Finally, Tyler Johnson finished his final collegiate game with a 73 yard touchdown catch and run in the 4th Quarter to give Minnesota the lead. It would be the deciding score as the Gophers stopped the Tigers on their final drive to win the Outback Bowl 31–24.

== Roster ==
2019 Minnesota Golden Gophers football team roster
Players
Coaches
Offense

Pos.	#	Name	Class
RB	1	Rodney Smith	Sr
QB	2	Tanner Morgan	So
RB	3	Cam Wiley	Fr
RB	4	Shannon Brooks	Sr
QB	5	Zack Annexstad	So
WR	6	Tyler Johnson	Sr
WR	7	Chris Autman-Bell	So
WR	11	Jornell Brooks	Fr
WR	12	Erik Gibson	Fr
WR	13	Rashod Bateman	So
QB	14	Cole Kramer	Fr
QB	15	Jacob Clark	Fr
QB	16	Jon Santaga	So
WR	17	Seth Green	Jr
WR	18	Clay Geary	Jr
QB	19	Samuel Pickerign	So
WR	20	Larry Wright	Fr
RB	21	Bryce Williams	So
WR	22	Mike Brown-Stephens	Fr
RB	23	Treyson Potts	Fr
RB	24	Mohamed Ibrahim	So
RB	25	Preston Jelen	Fr
WR	26	True Thompson	Jr
WR	27	Jimmy Buck	Fr
RB	28	Jason Williamson (injured)	Fr
TE	42	Ko Kieft	Jr
OL	50	J. J. Guedet	Fr
OL	51	Curtis Dunlap Jr.	Fr
OL	56	Kody Smith	Fr
OL	60	John Michael Schmitz	So
OL	63	Austin Beier	Fr
OL	64	Conner Olson	Jr
OL	65	Axel Ruschmeyer	So
OL	66	Nathan Boe	Fr
OL	67	Nate Umlor	So
OL	70	Sam Schlueter	Jr
OL	71	Ben Davis	Jr
OL	74	Kyle Sassack	So
OL	75	Tyler Cooper	Fr
OL	77	Blaise Andries	So
OL	78	Daniel Faalele	So
OL	79	Jason Dickson	Jr
TE	80	Jake Paulson	So
WR	81	Brock Annexstad (injured)	So
WR	82	Demetrius Douglas	So
WR	83	Harry Van Dyne	So
WR	84	Peter Udoibok	Fr
TE	85	Bryce Witham	Jr
TE	86	Clayton Witherspoon	So
TE	87	Nick Kallerup	Fr
TE	88	Brevyn Spann-Ford	Fr
WR	89	Nnamdi Adim-Madumere	Fr

Defense

Pos.	#	Name	Class
DB	1	Calvin Swenson	Jr
DB	2	Phillip Howard	Jr
DL	3	M. J. Anderson	Fr
DB	4	Terell Smith	So
LB	5	Trenton Guthrie	So
DB	6	Chris Williamson	Sr
DB	7	Solomon Brown	Fr
LB	8	Thomas Rush	So
DL	9	Esezi Otomewo	So
DB	11	Antoine Winfield Jr.	So
DL	12	Tai'yon Devers	Sr
LB	13	James Gordon IV	Fr
LB	14	Braelen Oliver	Fr
DB	15	C. J. Smith	Fr
DB	16	Coney Durr	Jr
DL	18	Micah Dew-Treadway	Sr
DL	19	Keonte Schad	Jr
LB	20	Donald Willis	Fr
LB	21	Kamal Martin	Sr
DB	22	Benny Sapp III	So
DB	23	Jordan Howden	So
DB	25	Benjamin St-Juste	Sr
DB	26	Justus Harris	Jr
DB	27	Tyler Nubin	Fr
DB	28	Matt Guggemos	Fr
LB	29	Josh Aune	Fr
DB	30	Caden Fey	Fr
DB	31	Kiondre Thomas	Jr
DL	33	D'Vion Harris	Fr
DL	34	Boye Mafe	So
LB	35	Danny Anderson	So
DB	36	Bishop McDonald	Jr
DB	40	Alex Strazzanti	So
LB	41	Thomas Barber	Sr
DB	42	Austin Winfield	Fr
LB	43	Bailey Schoenfelder	Jr
DL	44	Rashad Cheney Jr.	Fr
LB	45	Carter Coughlin	Sr
DL	46	Winston DeLattiboudere	Sr
DL	48	Ben McNaboe	Fr
DL	52	Jamaal Teague	So
LB	55	Mariano Sori-Marin	So
LB	56	Ty Barron	Fr
LB	57	Jack Kern	Fr
DL	59	Derik LeCaptain	Fr
DL	75	Malcolm Robinson	So
DL	90	Sam Renner	Sr
DL	91	Noah Hickcox	So
DL	92	Mayan Ahanotu	Fr
DL	93	Connor Novak-Goar	Jr
DL	94	Abi N-Okonji	Fr
DL	96	Logan Richter	Fr
DL	97	Micah Roane	Fr
DL	99	DeAngelo Carter	Fr

Special teams

Pos.	#	Name	Class
H	14	Casey O'Brien	So
K, P	33	Grant Ryerse	So
K	34	Brock Walker	Fr
LS	37	Brady Weeks	Fr
K	38	Michael Lantz	Fr
LS	39	Michael Vojvodich	Fr
P	46	Alex Melvin	Sr
P	47	Jacob Herbers	Sr
K	48	Anders Gelecinskyj	So
K	97	Michael Tarbutt	Sr
P	98	Tom Foley	Fr

Head coach

- P. J. Fleck (head coach)

Coordinators/assistant coaches

- Kirk Ciarrocca (offensive coordinator / quarterbacks)
- Joe Rossi (defensive coordinator / linebackers)
- Rob Wenger (special teams coordinator / outside linebackers)
- Kenni Burns (assistant head coach / running backs)
- Rod Chance (cornerbacks)
- Brian Callahan (run game coordinators / offensive line)
- Joe Harasymiak (defensive backs / safeties)
- Jim Panagos (defensive line)
- Clay Patterson (tight ends)
- Matt Simon (passing game coordinator / wide receivers)
- Gerrit Chernoff (General Manager)
- Dan Nichol (head strength & conditioning)
- Norries Wilson (director of player development)

Legend

- (C) Team captain
- (S) Suspended
- (I) Ineligible
- Injured
- Redshirt

Roster
Last update: April 18, 2019

== Players drafted into the NFL ==
Round	Pick	Player	Position	NFL Club
2	45	Antoine Winfield Jr.	S	Tampa Bay Buccaneers
5	161	Tyler Johnson	WR	Tampa Bay Buccaneers
5	175	Kamal Martin	ILB	Green Bay Packers
7	218	Carter Coughlin	OLB	New York Giants
7	247	Chris Williamson	CB	New York Giants
