= Tyler Johnson (American football) =

American football player (born 1998)

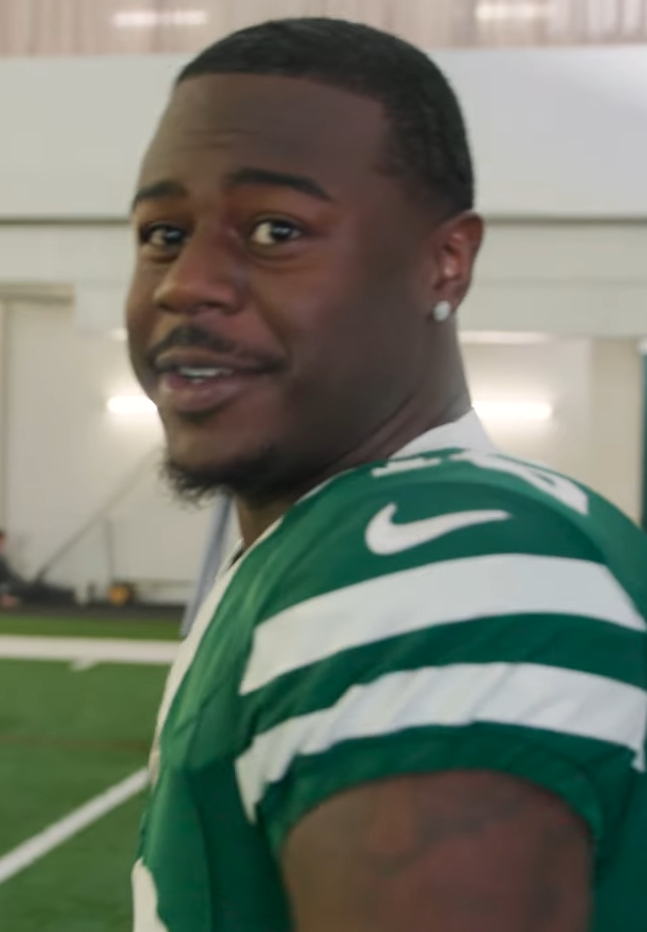
- Johnson with the New York Jets in 2025

Profile
- Position: Wide receiver

Personal information
- Born: August 25, 1998 (age 28); Minneapolis, Minnesota, U.S.
- Listed height: 6 ft 1 in (1.85 m)
- Listed weight: 208 lb (94 kg)

Career information
- High school: North Community (Minneapolis)
- College: Minnesota (2016–2019)
- NFL draft: 2020: 5th round, 161st overall pick

Career history
- Tampa Bay Buccaneers (2020–2021); Houston Texans (2022); Tampa Bay Buccaneers (2022)*; Las Vegas Raiders (2023)*; Los Angeles Rams (2023–2024); New York Jets (2025); Dallas Cowboys (2026)*; New York Jets (2026)*
- * Offseason or practice squad member only

Awards and highlights
- Super Bowl champion (LV); First-team All-Big Ten (2018, 2019)

Career NFL statistics as of 2025
- Receptions: 88
- Receiving yards: 1,025
- Receiving touchdowns: 5
- Stats at Pro Football Reference

Tyler Johnson (born August 25, 1998) is an American professional football wide receiver. He played college football for the Minnesota Golden Gophers, and was selected by the Tampa Bay Buccaneers in the fifth round of the 2020 NFL draft. He also briefly played for the Houston Texans.

== Early life ==
Johnson attended North Community High School in Minneapolis, Minnesota. In high school, he played quarterback and defensive back. He committed to play college football at the University of Minnesota as a wide receiver, after receiving offers from Wisconsin, Iowa, and Iowa State.

== College career ==
As a true freshman at Minnesota in 2016, Johnson played in all 13 games with one start and had 14 receptions for 141 yards and one touchdown. As a sophomore in 2017, he started the first ten games of the season before suffering an injury which cost him the final two games. He ended the season with 35 catches for 677 yards and seven touchdowns. As a junior in 2018, Johnson started all 13 games, recording 78 receptions for school records 1,169 yards and 12 touchdowns. He was voted First-Team All-Big Ten Conference by the media, and Second-Team by the coaches. Johnson returned to Minnesota for his senior season in 2019 rather than enter the 2019 NFL draft. In his senior season, Johnson caught 86 passes for 1,318 yards and 13 touchdowns, all of which led the Big Ten and set new single-season school records. This earned him First-Team All-Big Ten honors. His season was capped by a 12-reception, 204-yard, two-touchdown performance against Auburn in the Outback Bowl, and he was named the 2020 Outback Bowl MVP. His 12 catches were tied for the 3rd most by a Minnesota receiver in one game, and his 204 yards were the second-most by a Minnesota receiver in one game. Johnson left Minnesota second all-time in receptions, with 213, and the all-time leader in both receiving yards, with 3,305, and receiving touchdowns, with 33.

=== College statistics ===
		Receiving							Rushing			
Year	GP	Rec	Yds	Avg	Long	100+	200+	TD	Att	Yds	Avg	TD
2016	7	14	141	10.1	34	0	0	1	0	0	0	0
2017	10	35	968	19.3	67T	3	0	7	0	0	0	0
2018	13	78	1,324	15.0	52	6	0	12	0	0	0	0
2019	13	86	1,318	15.3	73T	6	1	13	1	−1	−1	0
Total		213	3,305	15.5	73T	15	1	33	1	-1	-1	0

== Professional career ==
Pre-draft measurables
Height	Weight	Arm length	Hand span	Wingspan
6 ft 1 3/8 in (1.86 m)	206 lb (93 kg)	30 7/8 in (0.78 m)	9 in (0.23 m)	6 ft 3 in (1.91 m)
All values from NFL Combine

=== Tampa Bay Buccaneers (first stint) ===
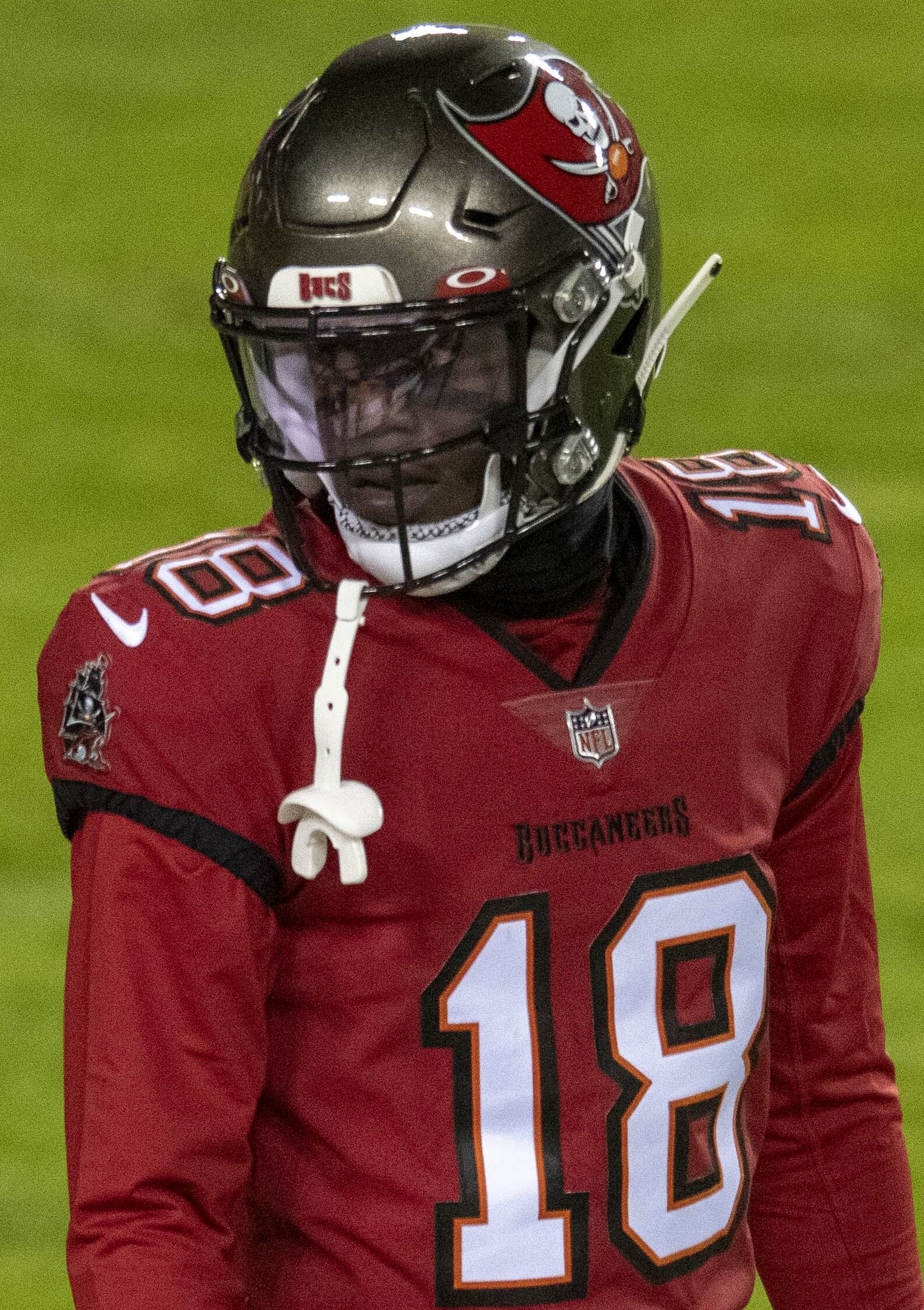
Johnson playing for the Tampa Bay Buccaneers in the 2020–21 playoffs

Johnson was selected by the Tampa Bay Buccaneers with the 161st pick in the fifth round of the 2020 NFL draft. In Week 5 of the 2020 season, he recorded his first four career receptions for 61 receiving yards in the 20–19 loss to the Chicago Bears. In Week 6 against the Green Bay Packers, he scored his first professional receiving touchdown on a seven-yard reception from Tom Brady. Overall, Johnson finished his rookie season with 12 receptions for 169 receiving yards and two receiving touchdowns in 14 games. Johnson drew a critical, game-sealing pass-interference penalty on Packers cornerback Kevin King in the National Football Conference Championship game, which the Bucs won 31–26 to advance to Super Bowl LV, where they won 31–9 over the Kansas City Chiefs. Johnson earned a single target in the win.

In the 2021 season, Johnson had 36 receptions for 360 yards.

The Buccaneers waived Johnson on August 30, 2022.

=== Houston Texans ===
On August 31, 2022, Johnson was claimed off waivers by the Houston Texans. He was released on October 25.

=== Tampa Bay Buccaneers (second stint) ===
On October 31, 2022, Johnson was signed to the Buccaneers practice squad.

=== Las Vegas Raiders ===
On January 25, 2023, Johnson signed a reserve/future contract with the Las Vegas Raiders. He was waived by Las Vegas on May 15.

=== Los Angeles Rams ===
On May 30, 2023, Johnson signed with the Los Angeles Rams. He was waived on August 29, and re-signed to the practice squad. He was promoted to the active roster on January 2, 2024.

Johnson made 15 appearances (2 starts) for the Rams in 2024, posting 26 receptions for 291 yards and one touchdown.

=== New York Jets (first stint) ===
On March 15, 2025, Johnson signed with the New York Jets. He was waived on August 26 and re-signed to the practice squad the next day. Johnson was promoted to the active roster on September 8. He finished the 2025 season with 12 receptions for 197 yards and one touchdown.

=== Dallas Cowboys ===
On April 27, 2026, Johnson signed with the Dallas Cowboys. On August 30, he was released by the Cowboys as a part of final roster cuts.

=== New York Jets (second stint) ===
On September 15, 2026, Johnson signed with the New York Jets' practice squad. On October 13, he was released.
