= 2019 Utah Utes football team =

American college football season

2019 Utah Utes football

Pac-12 South Division champion

Pac-12 Championship Game, L 15–37 vs Oregon

Alamo Bowl, L 10–38 vs. Texas
- Conference: Pac-12 Conference
- South Division

Ranking
- Coaches: No. 16
- AP: No. 16
- Record: 11–3 (8–1 Pac-12)
- Head coach: Kyle Whittingham (15th season)
- Offensive coordinator: Andy Ludwig (5th season)
- Offensive scheme: Spread
- Defensive coordinator: Morgan Scalley (4th season)
- Base defense: 4–3
- Home stadium: Rice–Eccles Stadium

Uniform
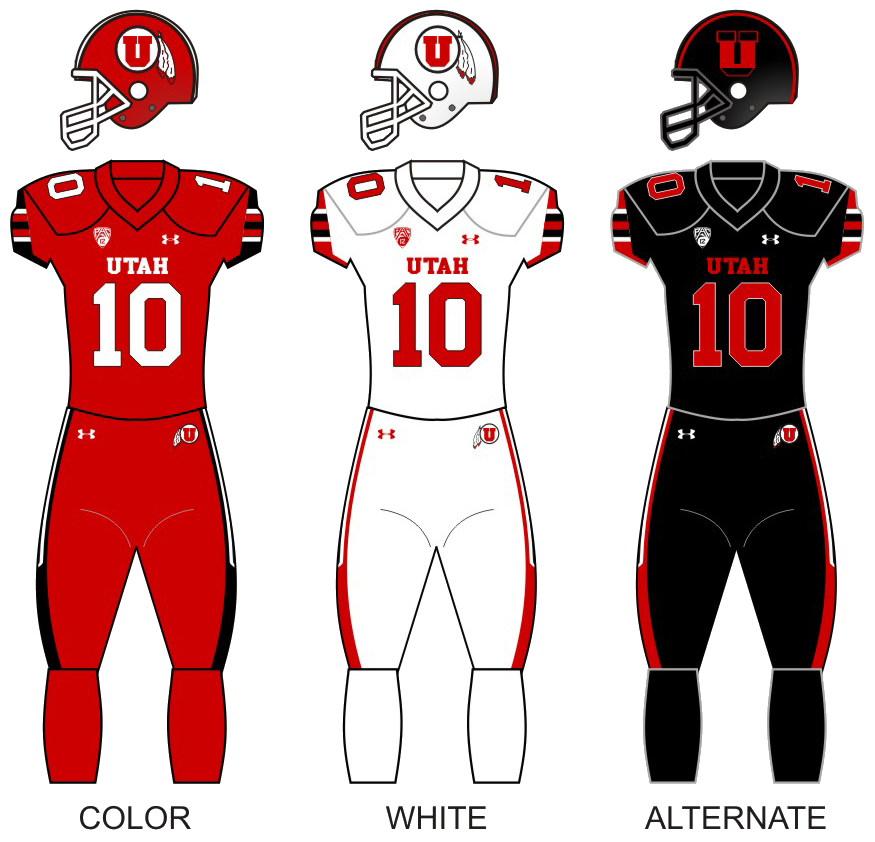

2019 Pac-12 Conference football standings
| | Conf. | | | Overall |
| Team | W | | L | W | | L |
|---|---|---|---|---|---|---|
North Division
| No. 5 Oregon xy$ | 8 | – | 1 | 12 | – | 2 |
| California | 4 | – | 5 | 8 | – | 5 |
| Washington | 4 | – | 5 | 8 | – | 5 |
| Oregon State | 4 | – | 5 | 5 | – | 7 |
| Washington State | 3 | – | 6 | 6 | – | 7 |
| Stanford | 3 | – | 6 | 4 | – | 8 |
South Division
| No. 16 Utah xy | 8 | – | 1 | 11 | – | 3 |
| USC | 7 | – | 2 | 8 | – | 5 |
| Arizona State | 4 | – | 5 | 8 | – | 5 |
| UCLA | 4 | – | 5 | 4 | – | 8 |
| Colorado | 3 | – | 6 | 5 | – | 7 |
| Arizona | 2 | – | 7 | 4 | – | 8 |
Championship: Oregon 37, Utah 15
$ – Conference champion; x – Division champion/co-champions; y – Championship game participant; Rankings from AP Poll

The 2019 Utah Utes football team represented the University of Utah during the 2019 NCAA Division I FBS football season. The Utes were led by 15th-year head coach Kyle Whittingham and played their home games at Rice–Eccles Stadium in Salt Lake City. They competed as members of the South Division of the Pac-12 Conference.

== Preseason ==
=== Pac-12 media days ===
==== Pac-12 media poll ====
In the 2019 Pac-12 media poll, Utah was voted as the favorite to win both the South Division and the Pac–12 Championship Game.

== Schedule ==
Utah's 2019 schedule would begin on Thursday, August 29 on the road against rival BYU, a football independent. They would round out their non-conference slate with home games against Northern Illinois of the Mid-American Conference and Idaho State of the Big Sky Conference. In Pac-12 Conference play, the Utes would play the other members of the South Division and draw California, Oregon State, Washington, and Washington State from the North Division. They would not play Oregon or Stanford as part of the regular season.

| Date | Time | Opponent | Rank | Site | TV | Result | Attendance |
|---|---|---|---|---|---|---|---|
| August 29 | 8:15 p.m. | at BYU* | No. 14 | LaVell Edwards Stadium; Provo, UT (Holy War) | ESPN | W 30–12 | 61,626 |
| September 7 | 11:00 a.m. | Northern Illinois* | No. 13 | Rice–Eccles Stadium; Salt Lake City, UT | P12N | W 35–17 | 45,919 |
| September 14 | 2:15 p.m. | Idaho State* | No. 11 | Rice–Eccles Stadium; Salt Lake City, UT | P12N | W 31–0 | 45,989 |
| September 20 | 7:00 p.m. | at USC | No. 10 | Los Angeles Memorial Coliseum; Los Angeles, CA (Big Noon Kickoff) | FS1 | L 23–30 | 55,719 |
| September 28 | 8:00 p.m. | Washington State^{†} | No. 19 | Rice–Eccles Stadium; Salt Lake City, UT | FS1 | W 38–13 | 46,115 |
| October 12 | 6:00 p.m. | at Oregon State | No. 15 | Reser Stadium; Corvallis, OR | P12N | W 52–7 | 31,730 |
| October 19 | 4:00 p.m. | No. 17 Arizona State | No. 13 | Rice–Eccles Stadium; Salt Lake City, UT | P12N | W 21–3 | 46,402 |
| October 26 | 8:00 p.m. | California | No. 12 | Rice–Eccles Stadium; Salt Lake City, UT | FS1 | W 35–0 | 46,626 |
| November 2 | 2:00 p.m. | at Washington | No. 9 | Husky Stadium; Seattle, WA | FOX | W 33–28 | 69,270 |
| November 16 | 6:00 p.m. | UCLA | No. 7 | Rice–Eccles Stadium; Salt Lake City, UT | FOX | W 49–3 | 47,307 |
| November 23 | 8:00 p.m. | at Arizona | No. 7 | Arizona Stadium; Tucson, AZ | FS1 | W 35–7 | 55,675 |
| November 30 | 5:30 p.m. | Colorado | No. 6 | Rice–Eccles Stadium; Salt Lake City, UT (Rumble in the Rockies) | ABC | W 45–15 | 46,879 |
| December 6 | 6:00 p.m. | vs. No. 13 Oregon | No. 5 | Levi's Stadium; Santa Clara, CA (Pac-12 Championship Game) | ABC | L 15–37 | 38,679 |
| December 31 | 5:30 p.m. | vs. Texas* | No. 11 | Alamodome; San Antonio, TX (Alamo Bowl) | ESPN | L 10–38 | 60,147 |
*Non-conference game; ^{†}Homecoming; Rankings from AP Poll and CFP Rankings after November 5 released prior to game; All times are in Mountain time

== Rankings ==
Ranking movements Legend: ██ Increase in ranking ██ Decrease in ranking
| | Week | | | | | | | | | | | | | | | | |
| Poll | Pre | 1 | 2 | 3 | 4 | 5 | 6 | 7 | 8 | 9 | 10 | 11 | 12 | 13 | 14 | 15 | Final |
|---|---|---|---|---|---|---|---|---|---|---|---|---|---|---|---|---|---|
| AP | 14 | 13 | 11 | 10 | 19 | 17 | 15 | 13 | 12 | 9 | 8 | 8 | 7 | 6 | 5 | 12 | 16 |
| Coaches | 15 | 15 | 12 | 11 | 19 | 17 | 15 | 14 | 12 | 10 | 9 | 9 | 8 | 6 | 5 | 10 | 16 |
| CFP | Not released | | | | | | | | | | 8 | 7 | 7 | 6 | 5 | 11 | Not released |

== Game summaries ==
=== At BYU ===
| | 1 | 2 | 3 | 4 | Total |
|---|---|---|---|---|---|
| No. 14 Utes | 3 | 6 | 7 | 14 | 30 |
| Cougars | 0 | 6 | 0 | 6 | 12 |

=== Northern Illinois ===
| | 1 | 2 | 3 | 4 | Total |
|---|---|---|---|---|---|
| Huskies | 7 | 10 | 0 | 0 | 17 |
| No. 13 Utes | 0 | 21 | 7 | 7 | 35 |

=== Idaho State ===
| | 1 | 2 | 3 | 4 | Total |
|---|---|---|---|---|---|
| Bengals | 0 | 0 | 0 | 0 | 0 |
| No. 11 Utes | 17 | 7 | 7 | 0 | 31 |

=== At USC ===
Utah Utes at USC Trojans

| Quarter | 1 | 2 | 3 | 4 | Total |
|---|---|---|---|---|---|
| No. 10 Utes | 7 | 3 | 7 | 6 | 23 |
| Trojans | 14 | 0 | 7 | 9 | 30 |

at Los Angeles Memorial Coliseum, Los Angeles, California

- Date: September 20, 2019
- Game time: 7:00 p.m. MST
- Game attendance: 55,719
- Referee: Michael Mothershed (Pac 12)
- TV announcers (FS1): Joe Davis, Brock Huard, Bruce Feldman

Game information

First quarter

- USC (12:57) – #19 Matt Fink to #21 Tyler Vaughns 29 yard pass TD
  (#40 Chase McGrath kick) – USC 7–0
- UTAH (10:39) – #7 Devonta'e Henry-Cole 17 yard run TD
  (#97 Jadon Redding kick) – USC 7–7
- USC (8:11) – #19 Matt Fink to #8 Amon-Ra St. Brown 31 yard pass TD
  (#40 Chase McGrath kick) – USC 14–7

Second quarter

- UTAH (6:44) – #97 Jadon Redding 38 yard Field Goal – USC 14–10

Third quarter

- USC (9:54) – #19 Matt Fink to #6 Michael Pittman Jr. 77 yard pass TD
  (#40 Chase McGrath kick) – USC 21–10
- UTAH (3:47) – #1 Tyler Huntley to #89 Cole Fotheringham 2 yard pass TD
  (#97 Jadon Redding kick) – USC 21–17

Fourth quarter

- UTAH (11:57) – #97 Jadon Redding 24 yard Field Goal – USC 21–20
- USC (8:51) – USC Defense Safety – USC 23–20
- USC (6:58) – #30 Markese Stepp 4 yard run TD
  (#40 Chase McGrath kick) – USC 30–20
- UTAH (4:01) – #97 Jadon Redding 38 yard Field Goal – USC 30–23

Passing

- USC – #19 Matt Fink – 21/30 351 Yds – 3 TD 1 Int
- UTAH – #1 Tyler Huntley – 22/30 210 Yds – 1 TD

Rushing

- USC – #30 Markese Stepp – 3 Runs 11 Yds – 1 TD
- UTAH – #6 Devin Brumfield – 10 Runs 63 Yds

Receiving (halftime)

- USC – #6 Michael Pittman Jr. – 10 Rec 232 Yds – 1 TD
- UTAH – #89 Cole Fotheringham – 3 Rec 23 Yds – 1TD

=== Washington State ===
| | 1 | 2 | 3 | 4 | Total |
|---|---|---|---|---|---|
| Cougars | 7 | 6 | 0 | 0 | 13 |
| No. 19 Utes | 7 | 14 | 10 | 7 | 38 |

=== At Oregon State ===
| | 1 | 2 | 3 | 4 | Total |
|---|---|---|---|---|---|
| No. 15 Utes | 21 | 14 | 14 | 3 | 52 |
| Beavers | 0 | 0 | 0 | 7 | 7 |

=== Arizona State ===
No. 17 Arizona State Sun Devils (5–1) at No. 13 Utah Utes (5–1) – Game summary

| Quarter | 1 | 2 | 3 | 4 | Total |
|---|---|---|---|---|---|
| No. 17 Sun Devils | 0 | 0 | 3 | 0 | 3 |
| No. 13 Utes | 0 | 14 | 0 | 7 | 21 |

at Rice-Eccles Stadium • Salt Lake City, UT

- Date: October 19, 2019
- Game time: 3:00 p.m.
- Game weather: Rain, 46 °F (8 °C)
- Game attendance: 46,402
- Referee: Mark Duddy
- TV announcers (Pac-12 Network): Ted Robinson (play-by-play), Yogi Roth (analyst), Lewis Johnson (sideline reporter)

Game information

First quarter

- No scoring plays

Second quarter

- (8:59) UTAH – Jaylen Dixon 10-yard run, Jadon Redding kick (Drive: 7 plays, 60 yards, 3:28; Utah 7–0)
- (1:08) UTAH – Zack Moss 1-yard run, Jadon Redding kick (Drive: 12 plays, 73 yards, 5:39; Utah 14–0)

Third quarter

- (6:50) ASU – Cristian Zendejas 40-yard field goal (Drive: 4 plays, -4 yards, 2:08; Utah 14–3)

Fourth quarter

- (5:24) UTAH – Zack Moss 32-yard run, Jadon Redding kick (Drive: 1 play, 32 yards, 0:09; Utah 21–3)

| Statistics | ASU | UTAH |
|---|---|---|
| First downs | 8 | 20 |
| Total yards | 136 | 342 |
| Rushing yards | 33–111 | 43–151 |
| Passing yards | 25 | 191 |
| Passing: Comp–Att–Int | 4–18–1 | 14–24–1 |
| Time of possession | 24:42 | 35:18 |

| Team | Category | Player | Statistics |
|---|---|---|---|
| Arizona State | Passing | Jayden Daniels | 14/18, 25 yards, INT |
| Arizona State | Rushing | Eno Benjamin | 15 carries, 104 yards |
| Arizona State | Receiving | Frank Darby | 1 reception, 12 yards |
| Utah | Passing | Tyler Huntley | 12/19, 171 yards, INT |
| Utah | Rushing | Zack Moss | 25 carries, 99 yards, 2 TD |
| Utah | Receiving | Zack Moss | 3 receptions, 78 yards |

=== California ===
| | 1 | 2 | 3 | 4 | Total |
|---|---|---|---|---|---|
| Golden Bears | 0 | 0 | 0 | 0 | 0 |
| No. 12 Utes | 7 | 21 | 7 | 0 | 35 |

=== At Washington ===
Utah at Washington – Game summary

| Quarter | 1 | 2 | 3 | 4 | Total |
|---|---|---|---|---|---|
| No. 9 Utes | 0 | 13 | 6 | 14 | 33 |
| Huskies | 7 | 7 | 7 | 7 | 28 |

at Husky Stadium • Seattle, WA

- Date: November 2, 2019
- Game time: 1:00 p.m. PDT
- Game attendance: 69,270
- Referee: Mike McCabe
- TV announcers (FOX): Joe Davis, Brock Huard, Bruce Feldman

Game information

Top passers

- Utah – Tyler Huntley – 19/24, 284 yards, TD
- UW – Jacob Eason – 29/52, 316 yards, 4 TD, 2 INT

Top rushers

- Utah – Zack Moss – 27 carries, 100 yards, TD
- UW – Salvon Ahmed – 14 carries, 50 yards

Top receiving

- Utah – Jaylen Dixon – 2 receptions, 72 yards
- UW – Hunter Bryant – 6 receptions, 105 yards, 2 TD

=== UCLA ===
| | 1 | 2 | 3 | 4 | Total |
|---|---|---|---|---|---|
| Bruins | 3 | 0 | 0 | 0 | 3 |
| No. 7 Utes | 7 | 21 | 7 | 14 | 49 |

=== At Arizona ===
No. 7 Utah Utes (9–1) vs Arizona Wildcats (4–6)

| Team | 1 | 2 | 3 | 4 | Total |
|---|---|---|---|---|---|
| • No. 7 Utes | 14 | 0 | 14 | 7 | 35 |
| Wildcats | 0 | 0 | 0 | 7 | 7 |

- Date: November 23
- Location: Arizona Stadium • Tucson, AZ
- Game start: 8:00 p.m. MDT
- Game attendance: 35,991
- Game weather: Clear, 58 °F (14 °C)
- Referee: Mark Duddy
- TV announcers (FS1): Cory Provus (play-by-play), Petros Papadakis (analyst), Shane Vereen (sideline reporter)

Scoring summary
| 1 | 7:39 | UTAH | Brant Kuithe 3-yard run (Jadon Redding kick) (11 plays, 75 yards, 5:56) | UTAH 7–0 |
| 1 | 0:37 | UTAH | Demari Simpkins 3-yard pass from Tyler Huntley (Jadon Redding kick) (10 plays, 72 yards, 5:12) | UTAH 14–0 |
| 3 | 12:50 | UTAH | Zack Moss 41-yard run (Jadon Redding kick) (6 plays, 75 yards, 2:10) | UTAH 21–0 |
| 3 | 8:08 | UTAH | Brant Kuithe 6-yard run (Jadon Redding kick) (6 plays, 75 yards, 3:33) | UTAH 28–0 |
| 4 | 12:47 | UTAH | TJ Green 1-yard run (Jadon Redding kick) (4 plays, 18 yards, 1:57) | UTAH 35–0 |
| 4 | 1:50 | ARIZ | Grant Gunnell 7-yard run (Lucas Havrisik kick) (12 plays, 85 yards, 5:00) | UTAH 35–7 |

Statistics

| Statistics | Utah | Arizona |
|---|---|---|
| First downs | 28 | 11 |
| Total yards | 517 | 196 |
| Rushing yards | 297 | 61 |
| Passing yards | 220 | 135 |
| Turnovers | 1 | 0 |
| Time of possession | 39:32 | 20:28 |

| Team | Category | Player | Statistics |
|---|---|---|---|
| Utah | Passing | Tyler Huntley | 19/23, 211 yards, TD, INT |
| Utah | Rushing | Zack Moss | 26 carries, 203 yards, TD |
| Utah | Receiving | Brant Kuithe | 4 receptions, 81 yards |
| Arizona | Passing | Grant Gunnell | 8/16, 96 yards |
| Arizona | Rushing | J. J. Taylor | 10 carries, 33 yards |
| Arizona | Receiving | Cedric Peterson | 4 receptions, 63 yards |

=== Colorado ===
| | 1 | 2 | 3 | 4 | Total |
|---|---|---|---|---|---|
| Buffaloes | 7 | 0 | 0 | 8 | 15 |
| No. 6 Utes | 0 | 17 | 14 | 14 | 45 |

=== Vs. Oregon (Pac-12 Championship game) ===
Utah Utes vs. Oregon Ducks – Game summary

| Quarter | 1 | 2 | 3 | 4 | Total |
|---|---|---|---|---|---|
| No. 13 Ducks | 10 | 10 | 3 | 14 | 37 |
| No. 5 Utes | 0 | 0 | 15 | 0 | 15 |

at Levi's Stadium • Santa Clara, California

- Date: December 6, 2019
- Game time: 5:00 pm
- Game attendance: 38,679
- Referee: Steve Strimling
- TV announcers (ABC): Chris Fowler (play-by-play), Kirk Herbstreit (analyst), Molly McGrath (sideline)
- ESPN game summary

Game information

First quarter

- ORE – C. J. Verdell 3 Yd Run (Camden Lewis Kick), 8:00. Oregon 7–0. Drive: 9 plays, 67 yards, 3:43.
- ORE – Camden Lewis 23 Yd Field Goal, 4:17. Oregon 10–0. Drive: 6 plays, 56 yards, 2:43.

Second quarter

- ORE – Johnny Johnson III 45 Yd pass from Justin Herbert (Camden Lewis Kick), 11:02. Oregon 17–0. Drive: 3 plays, 70 yards, 1:10.
- ORE – Camden Lewis 30 Yd Field Goal, 4:56. Oregon 20–0. Drive: 10 plays, 57 yards, 4:03.

Third quarter

- UTAH – Zack Moss 24 Yd pass from Tyler Huntley (Jadon Redding Kick), 10:52. Oregon 20–7. Drive: 6 plays, 53 yards, 2:27.
- ORE – Camden Lewis 25 Yd Field Goal, 4:56. Oregon 23–7. Drive: 8 plays, 43 yards, 2:49.
- UTAH – Samson Nacua 25 Yd pass from Tyler Huntley (Tyler Huntley–Samson Nacua pass), 1:13. Oregon 23–15. Drive: 7 plays, 75 yards, 3:43.

Fourth quarter

- ORE – C. J. Verdell 70 Yd Run (Camden Lewis Kick), 7:09. Oregon 30–15. Drive: 5 plays, 90 yards, 2:19.
- ORE – C. J. Verdell 31 Yd Run (Camden Lewis Kick), 2:33. Oregon 37–15. Drive: 2 plays, 35 yards, 0:49.

Top passers

- ORE – Justin Herbert – 14–26, 193 yards, 1 TD
- UTAH – Tyler Huntley – 17–29, 193 yards, 2 TD, 2 INT

Top rushers

- ORE – C. J. Verdell – 18 carries, 208 yards, 3 TD
- UTAH – Zack Moss – 19 carries, 113 yards

Top receivers

- ORE – Johnny Johnson III – 6 receptions, 87 yards, 1 TD
- UTAH – Zack Moss – 4 receptions, 57 yards, 1 TD

=== Vs. Texas (Alamo Bowl) ===
Texas Longhorns vs. Utah Utes (Alamo Bowl)

| Quarter | 1 | 2 | 3 | 4 | Total |
|---|---|---|---|---|---|
| No. 12 Utes | 0 | 0 | 3 | 7 | 10 |
| Longhorns | 3 | 7 | 14 | 14 | 38 |

at Alamodome, San Antonio, TX

- Date: December 31, 2019
- Game time: 4:30 p.m. (PST)
- Game weather: Indoors
- Game attendance: 60,147
- Referee: John McDaid
- TV announcers (ESPN): Dave Flemming (play-by-play), Louis Riddick (analyst), Paul Carcaterra (sideline)
- ESPN game summary

Game information

First Quarter

- (10:26) UT – Cameron Dicker 29 yard field goal (Drive: 10 plays, 63 yards, 4:34; Texas 3–0)

Second Quarter

- (13:24) UT – Collin Johnson 5 yard pass from Sam Ehlinger, Cameron Dicker kick (Drive: 2 plays, 6 yards, 0:43; Texas 10–0)

Third Quarter

- (10:30) UT – Keaontay Ingram 11 yard pass from Sam Ehlinger, Cameron Dicker kick (Drive: 3 plays, 43 yards, 1:04; Texas 17–0)
- (4:58) UTAH – Jadon Redding 32 yard field goal (Drive: 11 plays, 60 yards, 5:32; Texas 17–3)
- (0:06) UT – Sam Ehlinger 6 yard rush, Cameron Dicker kick (Drive: 7 plays, 75 yards, 4:52; Texas 24–3)

Fourth Quarter

- (11:34) UTAH – Demari Simpkins 4 yard pass from Tyler Huntley, Jadon Redding kick (Drive: 9 plays, 75 yards, 3:32; Texas 24–10)
- (8:58) UT – Devin Duvernay 15 yard pass from Sam Ehlinger, Cameron Dicker kick (Drive: 7 plays, 75 yards, 2:36; Texas 31–10)
- (7:54) UT – Keaontay Ingram 49 yard rush, Cameron Dicker kick (Drive: 1 play, 49 yards, 0:13; Texas 38–10)

Passing

- UT – Sam Ehlinger – 12/18, 201 yards, 3 TD, 1 INT
- UTAH – Tyler Huntley – 15/23, 126 yards, 1 TD

Rushing

- UT – Keaontay Ingram – 13 carries, 108 yards, 1 TD
- UTAH – Zack Moss – 16 carries, 57 yards

Receiving

- UT – Devin Duvernay – 3 receptions, 92 yards, 1 TD
- UTAH – Brant Kuithe, Cole Fotheringham (Note: Both Kuithe and Fotheringham finished with the same number of receptions and receiving yards, meaning Utah finished with two leading receivers.) – 3 receptions, 30 yards

== Players drafted into the NFL ==
The Utes had seven players drafted in the 2020 NFL draft.

| Round | Pick | Player | Position | NFL Club |
|---|---|---|---|---|
| 2 | 50 | Jaylon Johnson | CB | Chicago Bears |
| 3 | 85 | Julian Blackmon | S | Indianapolis Colts |
| 3 | 86 | Zack Moss | RB | Buffalo Bills |
| 3 | 104 | Terrell Burgess | S | Los Angeles Rams |
| 4 | 114 | Leki Fotu | DT | Arizona Cardinals |
| 5 | 179 | Bradlee Anae | DE | Dallas Cowboys |
| 6 | 197 | John Penisini | DT | Detroit Lions |
