= Taylor Davis (sportscaster) =

American sportscaster

Taylor Davis is an American college sports reporter for ESPN where she has worked for since 2014. She covers college football coverage throughout the fall and college gymnastics coverage across ESPN platforms. She also covered the College World Series

== Early Life and College ==
Davis is from Deatsville, Alabama. She graduated from Edgewood Academy in 2010 and Auburn University on 2014 with a bachelor's degree in broadcast journalism. While at Auburn, Davis work at Auburn's television station, Eagle Eye TV.

== Career ==
After Graduation from Auburn, Davis was hired by ESPN as a production assistant. After two years in production, Davis got her first chance as a sideline reporter when she was called into her boss's office and offered the role at two college gymnastics meets. She balanced her work as a PA and On-Air talent before being in front of the camera full-time. She also co-hosts a podcast called SEC State of Mind with fellow Auburn alum and former NFL Quarterback Jason Campbell. In the first week of the 2025 season while covering the matchup between Southern Mississippi and Mississippi State, she went viral appearing to mouth the lyrics to Drake’s verse from the 2018 Travis Scott smash hit Sicko Mode while holding her mic on the sidelines.
