= Chris Williamson (American football) =

American football player (born 1997)

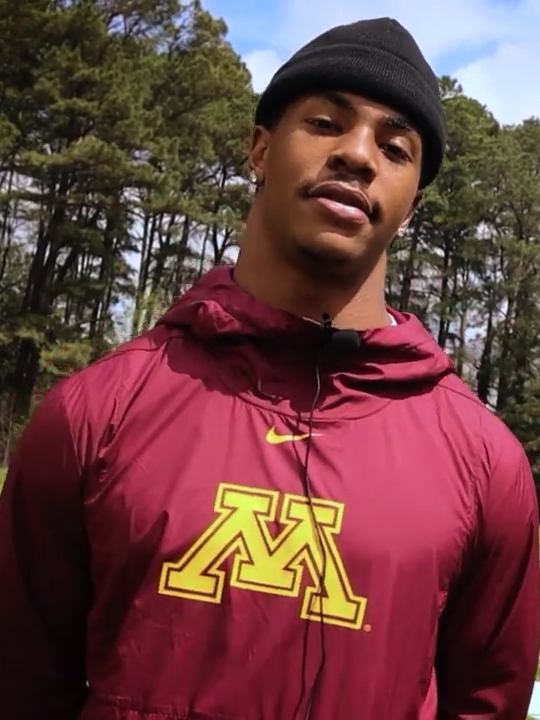
- Williamson in 2020

No. 29
- Position: Cornerback

Personal information
- Born: May 19, 1997 (age 29); Atlanta, Georgia, U.S.
- Listed height: 6 ft 0 in (1.83 m)
- Listed weight: 205 lb (93 kg)

Career information
- High school: Gainesville (Gainesville, Georgia)
- College: Florida (2015–2016); Minnesota (2017–2019)
- NFL draft: 2020: 7th round, 247th overall pick

Career history
- New York Giants (2020)*; Atlanta Falcons (2020–2021); Detroit Lions (2021)*; Tennessee Titans (2022)*
- * Offseason or practice squad member only

Career NFL statistics
- Total tackles: 5
- Stats at Pro Football Reference

Chris Williamson (born May 19, 1997) is an American former professional football player who was a cornerback in the National Football League (NFL). He played college football for the Minnesota Golden Gophers, and was selected by the New York Giants in the seventh round of the 2020 NFL draft. He was a member of the Atlanta Falcons, Detroit Lions, and Tennessee Titans.

== College career ==
Williamson was rated as a 4-star recruit by Rivals, and a 3-star recruit by ESPN and 247 coming out of high school in the class 2015. He played wide receiver and defensive back in high school, but played defense at Florida. After playing in 14 games with 1 start, and making 5 tackles over his first two seasons with the Gators, Williamson transferred to the University of Minnesota. He sat out a year in 2017, in compliance with NCAA transfer rules. In his junior year, 2018, he settled into the nickelback role, where he played 11 games as a reserve, recording 34 tackles, four pass breakups, and one interception. During his senior season of 2019, he became a starter and recorded 57 tackles including four for a loss, 2.5 sacks, one interception and three pass breakups. In his career, he posted 96 total tackles, 7.5 tackles for a loss, 3.5 sacks, nine passes defensed, and two interceptions. Williamson was invited to the East-West Shrine Game.

== Professional career ==
=== New York Giants ===
Williamson was selected by the New York Giants with the 247th pick in the seventh round of the 2020 NFL draft. He was waived on September 5, 2020, and signed to the practice squad the next day. The Giants released Williamson on December 3, 2020.

=== Atlanta Falcons ===
On December 9, 2020, the Atlanta Falcons signed Williamson to their practice squad. He signed a reserve/future contract on January 4, 2021.

On August 31, 2021, Williamson was waived by the Falcons and re-signed to the practice squad the next day. He was promoted to the active roster on November 9. He was waived on November 30 and re-signed to the practice squad. He was released on December 7.

=== Detroit Lions ===
On December 14, 2021, Williamson was signed to the Detroit Lions practice squad. He was released on December 28.

=== Tennessee Titans ===
On January 11, 2022, Williamson signed a reserve/future contract with the Tennessee Titans. He was waived with an injury designation on August 3, 2022. He cleared waivers and was placed on injured reserve the next day. He was waived off injured reserve on August 5.
