= Cole Fotheringham =

American football player (born 1997)

Profile
- Position: Tight end

Personal information
- Born: October 11, 1997 (age 29); San Clemente, California, U.S.
- Listed height: 6 ft 4 in (1.93 m)
- Listed weight: 243 lb (110 kg)

Career information
- High school: San Clemente (San Clemente, California)
- College: Utah (2018–2021)
- NFL draft: 2022: undrafted

Career history
- Las Vegas Raiders (2022–2023); Houston Texans (2024)*; Las Vegas Raiders (2024)*; Denver Broncos (2025)*; New England Patriots (2025)*
- * Offseason or practice squad member only

Career NFL statistics as of 2024
- Receptions: 1
- Receiving yards: 6
- Receiving touchdowns: 0
- Stats at Pro Football Reference

Cole Fotheringham (born October 11, 1997) is an American professional football tight end. He played college football for the Utah Utes and was signed by the Las Vegas Raiders as an undrafted free agent in 2022.

== Professional career ==
Pre-draft measurables
Height	Weight	Arm length	Hand span	40-yard dash	10-yard split	20-yard split	20-yard shuttle	Three-cone drill	Vertical jump	Broad jump	Bench press
6 ft 4 1/8 in (1.93 m)	246 lb (112 kg)	31 1/4 in (0.79 m)	9 1/2 in (0.24 m)	5.07 s	1.70 s	2.86 s	4.56 s	7.32 s	33 in (0.84 m)	10 ft 0 in (3.05 m)	21 reps
All values from Pro Day

=== Las Vegas Raiders ===
After not being selected in the 2022 NFL draft, Fotheringam signed with the Las Vegas Raiders as an undrafted free agent on May 12, 2022. He was waived during final roster cuts on August 30, and re–signed to the practice squad the following day.

On January 10, 2023, Fotheringham signed a reserve/future contract with the Raiders. On August 29, he was once again waived by the Raiders, and re–signed with the practice squad the next day. On December 24, Fotheringam was elevated to the active roster prior to the team's week 16 game against the Kansas City Chiefs. In the game he made his NFL debut, playing 19 offensive snaps with Michael Mayer out due to injury. He additionally caught his only target from Aidan O'Connell for a six–yard reception. On December 30, Fotheringam was again elevated to the active roster after Mayer and Jesper Horsted were ruled out for week 17. However, in the game he suffered a hamstring injury, and missed the remainder of the regular season as a result.

Fotheringham signed a reserve/future contract on January 8, 2024. He was waived on August 27.

=== Houston Texans ===
On August 29, 2024, Fotheringham signed with the practice squad of the Houston Texans. He was released by Houston on September 9.

=== Las Vegas Raiders (second stint) ===
On October 1, 2024, Fotheringham signed with the practice squad of the Raiders. He was released on December 17.

=== Denver Broncos ===
On May 12, 2025, Fotheringham was signed by the Denver Broncos. He was waived with an injury designation on June 3. On June 4, Fotheringham reverted to injured reserve. The next day, he was waived with an injury settlement.

=== New England Patriots ===
On July 30, 2025, Fotheringham signed with the New England Patriots. He was released by New England on August 22.
