= 2020 Middle Tennessee Blue Raiders football team =

American college football season

2020 Middle Tennessee Blue Raiders football
- Conference: Conference USA
- East Division
- Record: 3–6 (2–4 C-USA)
- Head coach: Rick Stockstill (15th season)
- Offensive coordinator: Tony Franklin (5th season)
- Offensive scheme: Bear raid
- Defensive coordinator: Scott Shafer (4th season)
- Base defense: Multiple 4–3
- Home stadium: Johnny "Red" Floyd Stadium

2020 Conference USA football standings
	Conf.			Overall
Team	W		L	W		L
East Division
Marshall xy	4	–	1	7	–	3
Florida Atlantic	4	–	2	5	–	4
Western Kentucky	4	–	3	5	–	7
Charlotte	2	–	2	2	–	4
Middle Tennessee	2	–	4	3	–	6
FIU	0	–	3	0	–	5
West Division
UAB xy$	3	–	1	6	–	3
UTSA	5	–	2	7	–	5
Louisiana Tech	4	–	2	5	–	5
North Texas	3	–	4	4	–	6
Rice	2	–	3	2	–	3
Southern Miss	2	–	4	3	–	7
UTEP	0	–	4	3	–	5
Championship: UAB 22, Marshall 13
$ – Conference champion; x – Division champion/co-champions; y – Championship game participant; Note: Due to COVID-19, Old Dominion opted out of the season.

The 2020 Middle Tennessee Blue Raiders football team represented Middle Tennessee State University as a member of the East Division of Conference USA (C-USA) during the 2020 NCAA Division I FBS football season. Led by 15th-year head coach Rick Stockstill, the Blue Raiders compiled an overall record of 3–6 with a mark of 2–4 in conference play, placing fifth in the C-USA's East Division. The team played home games at Johnny "Red" Floyd Stadium in Murfreesboro, Tennessee.

== Preseason ==
=== CUSA media days ===
The CUSA Media Days was held virtually for the first time in conference history.

=== Preseason All-CUSA teams ===
To be released

== Schedule ==
Middle Tennessee announced its 2020 football schedule on January 8, 2020. The original 2020 schedule consists of six home and six away games in the regular season. The Blue Raiders had games scheduled against Duke, Indiana State, Old Dominion, UConn, Virginia Tech, and UAB which were canceled due to the COVID-19 pandemic.

Date	Time	Opponent	Site	TV	Result	Attendance
September 5	12:30 p.m.	at Army*	Michie Stadium; West Point, NY	CBSSN	L 0–42	5,249
September 19	2:30 p.m.	Troy*	Johnny "Red" Floyd Stadium; Murfreesboro, TN (Battle for the Palladium)	ESPN	L 14–47	6,000
September 25	7:00 p.m.	at UTSA	Alamodome; San Antonio, TX	CBSSN	L 35–37	6,182
October 3	4:00 p.m.	Western Kentucky	Johnny "Red" Floyd Stadium; Murfreesboro, TN (100 Miles of Hate)	ESPN3	L 17–20	6,500
October 10	3:00 p.m.	at FIU	Riccardo Silva Stadium; Miami, FL	ESPNU	W 31–28	2,213
October 17	4:00 p.m.	North Texas	Johnny "Red" Floyd Stadium; Murfreesboro, TN	Stadium	L 35–52	5,000
October 24	2:30 p.m.	at Rice	Rice Stadium; Houston, TX	ESPN3	W 40–34 ^{2OT}	0
November 14	12:00 p.m.	at No. 16 Marshall	Joan C. Edwards Stadium; Huntington, WV	CBSSN	L 14–42	12,224
November 21	2:30 p.m.	at Troy*	Veterans Memorial Stadium; Troy, AL	ESPN3	W 20–17	12,000
*Non-conference game; Rankings from AP Poll released prior to the game; All times are in Central time

== Game summaries ==
=== At Army ===
Middle Tennessee at Army

Team	1	2	3	4	Total
Blue Raiders	0	0	0	0	0
• Black Knights	7	14	14	7	42

- Date: September 5, 2020
- Location: Michie Stadium
  West Point, NY
- Game start: 12:30 p.m. CDT
- Elapsed time: 3 hours and 12 minutes
- Game attendance: 5,249
- Game weather: 80 °F (27 °C) • Weather: Sunny • Wind: SW 6 MPH
- Referee: Mike Roche
- TV announcers (CBS Sports Network): Ben Holden (play–by–play), Ross Tucker (analyst), Tina Cervasio (sideline reporter)

Scoring summary
1	09:46	ARMY	Sandon McCoy 1-yard rush (Landon Salyers kick) (9 plays, 43 yards, 4:00)	ARMY 7–0
2	14:06	ARMY	Sandon McCoy 2-yard rush (Landon Salyers kick) (19 plays, 85 yards, 9:13)	ARMY 14–0
2	07:14	ARMY	Sandon McCoy 4-yard rush (Landon Salyers kick) (10 plays, 41 yards, 4:25)	ARMY 21–0
3	10:48	ARMY	Christian Anderson 24-yard rush (Landon Salyers kick) (7 plays, 71 yards, 4:07)	ARMY 28–0
3	06:33	ARMY	Jon Rhattigan 43-yard interception returned (Landon Salyers kick) (8 plays, 21 yards, 4:10)	ARMY 35–0
4	04:06	ARMY	Anthony Adkins 22-yard rush (Quinn Maretzki kick) (19 plays, 99 yards, 12:26)	ARMY 42–0

Statistics	Middle Tennessee	Army
First downs	13	24
Total yards	184	368
Rushing yards	75	340
Passing yards	109	28
Turnovers	4	0
Time of possession	24:31	35:29

Team	Category	Player	Statistics
Middle Tennessee	Passing	Chase Cunningham	7/10, 63 yards
Middle Tennessee	Rushing	Chaton Mobley	5 carries, 27 yards
Middle Tennessee	Receiving	Jarrin Pierce	4 receptions, 33 yards
Army	Passing	Christian Anderson	2/4, 28 yards
Army	Rushing	Tyrell Robinson	9 carries, 94 yards
Army	Receiving	Isaiah Alston	1 reception, 18 yards

=== Troy ===
Troy at Middle Tennessee State

Team	1	2	3	4	Total
• Trojans	7	19	14	7	47
Blue Raiders	7	0	0	7	14

- Date: September 19, 2020
- Location: Johnny "Red" Floyd Stadium
  Murfreesboro, TN
- Game start: 2:35 p.m. CDT
- Elapsed time: 3 hours and 23 minutes
- Game attendance: 6,000
- Game weather: 72 °F (22 °C) • Weather: Hazy, Cool, Nice • Wind: 6 N MPH
- Referee: Ken Antee
- TV announcers (ESPN): Dave Neal (play–by–play), Jay Walker (analyst), and Dawn Davenport (sideline reporter)

Scoring summary
1	11:13	TROY	Khalil McClain 8-yard pass from Gunnar Watson (Evan Legassey kick) (12 plays, 73 yards, 3:47)	TROY 7–0
1	01:33	MTSU	Asher O'Hara 2-yard rush (Crews Holt kick) (9 plays, 69 yards, 3:11)	TIE 7–7
2	14:11	TROY	Charlie Strong 1-yard rush (Evan Legassey kick) (7 plays, 61 yards, 2:14)	TROY 14–7
2	06:50	TROY	Evan Legassey 47-yard field goal (8 plays, 22 yards, 2:40)	TROY 17–7
2	01:29	TROY	Team Safety (3 plays, −6 yards, 0:15)	TROY 19–7
2	00:03	TROY	Khalil McClain 5-yard pass from Gunnar Watson (Evan Legassey kick) (10 plays, 60 yards, 1:20)	TROY 26–7
3	09:56	TROY	Carloss Crawford 1-yard rush (Evan Legassey kick) (10 plays, 38 yards, 4:20)	TROY 33–7
3	03:29	TROY	DK Billingsley 2-yard rush (Evan Legassey kick) (11 plays, 70 yards, 4:56)	TROY 40–7
4	06:22	TROY	Tyler Hussey 8-yard pass from Jacob Free (Evan Legassey kick) (7 plays, 72 yards, 3:37)	TROY 47–7
4	01:54	MTSU	Jaylin Lane 28-yard pass from Mike Diliello (Crews Holt kick) (9 plays, 70 yards, 4:22)	TROY 47–14

Statistics	Troy	Middle Tennessee
First downs	30	15
Total yards	496	241
Rushing yards	240	87
Passing yards	256	154
Turnovers	2	3
Time of possession	35:45	24:15

Team	Category	Player	Statistics
Troy	Passing	Gunnar Watson	26/37, 248 yards, 2 TDs, 1 INT
Troy	Rushing	B. J. Smith	10 carries, 81 yards
Troy	Receiving	Khalil McClain	6 receptions, 75 yards, 2 TDs
Middle Tennessee	Passing	Asher O'Hara	16/23, 109 yards, 1 INT
Middle Tennessee	Rushing	Asher O'Hara	14 carries, 45 yards, 1 TD
Middle Tennessee	Receiving	Jarrin Pierce	11 receptions, 81 yards

=== At UTSA ===
Middle Tennessee at Texas–San Antonio

Team	1	2	3	4	Total
Blue Raiders	3	7	13	12	35
• Roadrunners	0	17	17	3	37

- Date: September 25, 2020
- Location: Alamodome
  San Antonio, TX
- Game start: 7:06 p.m. CDT
- Elapsed time: 3 hours and 35 minutes
- Game attendance: 6,182
- Game weather: 74 °F (23 °C) • Weather: Indoors (N/A)
- Referee: Jonathan Noli
- TV announcers (CBS Sports Network): Carter Blackburn (play–by–play), Aaron Murray (analyst), and Amanda Balionis (sideline reporter)

Scoring summary
1	08:20	MTSU	Crew Holt 26-yard field goal (10 plays, 64 yards, 3:36)	MTSU 3–0
2	11:11	UTSA	Zakhari Franklin 25-yard pass from Frank Harris (Hunter Duplessis kick) (1 play, 40 yards, 0:16)	UTSA 7–3
2	07:38	UTSA	Sincere McCormick 11-yard rush (Hunter Duplessis kick) (2 plays, 14 yards, 0:36)	UTSA 14–3
2	01:08	MTSU	Chaton Mobley 1-yard rush (Crews Holt kick) (9 plays, 91 yards, 2:19)	UTSA 14–10
2	00:00	UTSA	Hunter Duplessis 24-yard field goal (11 plays, 63 yards, 1:08)	UTSA 17–10
3	11:25	UTSA	Hunter Duplessis 27-yard field goal (9 plays, 64 yards, 3:35)	UTSA 20–10
3	08:30	MTSU	Chaton Mobley 4-yard pass from Asher O'Hara (Crews Holt PAT blocked) (7 plays, 75 yards, 2:55)	UTSA 20–16
3	06:40	UTSA	Chaton Mobley 24-yard rush (Crews Holt kick) (3 plays, 96 yards, 1:06)	MTSU 23–20
3	06:01	UTSA	Sincere McCormick 1-yard rush (Hunter Duplessis kick) (3 plays, 49 yards, 0:39)	UTSA 27–23
3	02:12	UTSA	Joshua Cephus 7-yard pass from Josh Adkins (Hunter Duplessis kick) (7 plays, 66 yards, 2:41)	UTSA 34–23
4	14:46	MTSU	DJ England-Chisolm 26-yard pass from Asher O'Hara (two-point conversion pass attempt failed) (9 plays, 75 yards, 2:26)	UTSA 34–29
4	11:39	UTSA	Hunter Duplessis 35-yard field goal (9 plays, 55 yards, 3:07)	UTSA 37–29
4	01:04	MTSU	Yusuf Ali 6-yard pass from Asher O'Hara (two-point conversion pass attempt failed) (13 plays, 72 yards, 4:43)	UTSA 37–35

Statistics	Middle Tennessee	UTSA
First downs	27	16
Total yards	563	391
Rushing yards	191	88
Passing yards	372	303
Turnovers	2	1
Time of possession	35:40	24:20

Team	Category	Player	Statistics
Middle Tennessee	Passing	Asher O'Hara	31/47, 372 yards, 3 TDs, 2 INTs
Middle Tennessee	Rushing	Jayy McDonald	7 carries, 76 yards
Middle Tennessee	Receiving	Jarrin Pierce	7 receptions, 107 yards
UTSA	Passing	Josh Adkins	16/28, 233 yards, 1 TD
UTSA	Rushing	Sincere McCormick	19 carries, 82 yards, 2 TDs
UTSA	Receiving	Zakhari Franklin	6 receptions, 119 yards, 1 TD

=== Western Kentucky ===
Western Kentucky at Middle Tennessee

Team	1	2	3	4	Total
• Hilltoppers	0	10	3	7	20
Blue Raiders	0	10	0	7	17

- Date: October 3, 2020
- Location: Johnny "Red" Floyd Stadium
  Murfreesboro, TN
- Game start: 4:05 p.m. CDT
- Elapsed time: 3 hours and 3 minutes
- Game attendance: 6,500
- Game weather: 69 °F (21 °C) • Weather: Sunny & Nice • Wind: ESE 1 MPH
- Referee: Rodney Burnette
- TV announcers (ESPN3): Jake Rose (play–by–play) and Jeremy Kellem (analyst)

Scoring summary
2	14:09	WKU	Brayden Narveson 47-yard field goal (11 play, 30 yard, 5:02)	WKU 3–0
2	07:51	MTSU	Asher O'Hara 1-yard rush (Crews Holt kick) (14 plays, 75 yards, 6:18)	MTSU 7–3
2	02:59	MTSU	Crews Holt 44-yard field goal (8 plays, 42 yards, 2:03)	MTSU 10–3
2	00:21	WKU	Xavier Lane 6-yard pass from Tyrrell Pigrome (Brayden Narveson kick) (13 plays, 75 yards, 2:38)	TIE 10–10
3	03:26	WKU	Brayden Narveson 53-yard field goal (14 plays, 64 yards, 4:30)	WKU 13–10
4	06:04	WKU	Joshua Simon 11-yard pass from Tyrrell Pigrome (Brayden Narveson kick) (13 plays, 68 yards, 6:39)	WKU 20–10
4	02:07	MTSU	CJ Windham 2-yard pass from Asher O'Hara (Crews Holt kick) (12 plays, 75 yards, 3:57)	WKU 20–17

Statistics	Western Kentucky	Middle Tennessee
First downs	21	18
Total yards	326	319
Rushing yards	138	102
Passing yards	188	217
Turnovers	1	0
Time of possession	31:35	28:25

Team	Category	Player	Statistics
Western Kentucky	Passing	Tyrrell Pigrome	21/36, 188 yards, 2 TDs
Western Kentucky	Rushing	Tyrrell Pigrome	16 carries, 55 yards
Western Kentucky	Receiving	Xavier Lane	7 receptions, 73 yards, 1 TD
Middle Tennessee	Passing	Asher O'Hara	23/33, 217 yards, 1 TD
Middle Tennessee	Rushing	Asher O'Hara	25 carries, 98 yards, 1 TD
Middle Tennessee	Receiving	Jarrin Pierce	9 receptions, 65 yards

=== At FIU ===
Middle Tennessee at Florida International

Team	1	2	3	4	Total
• Blue Raiders	0	17	7	7	31
Panthers	7	7	14	0	28

- Date: October 10, 2020
- Location: Riccardo Silva Stadium
  Miami, FL
- Game start: 3:02 p.m. CDT
- Elapsed time: 3 hours and 31 minutes
- Game attendance: 2,213
- Game weather: 89 °F (32 °C) • Weather: Partly Cloudy • Wind: NE 10 MPH
- Referee: Kevin Randall
- TV announcers (ESPNU): Clay Matvick (play–by–play) and Rocky Boiman (analyst)

Scoring summary
1	12:09	FIU	Shaun Peterson Jr. 1-yard rush (Chase Gabriel kick) (4 plays, 23 yards, 1:41)	FIU 7–0
2	13:57	MTSU	Asher O'Hara 4-yard rush (Crews Holt kick) (12 plays, 80 yards, 5:20)	TIE 7–7
2	09:09	MTSU	Asher O'Hara 1-yard rush (Crews Holt kick) (5 plays, 64 yards, 1:38)	MTSU 14–7
2	08:53	FIU	Shaun Peterson Jr. 63-yard rush (Chase Gabriel kick) (1 play, 78 yards, 0:16)	TIE 14–14
2	00:53	MTSU	Crews Holt 44-yard field goal (9 plays, 46 yards, 3:42)	MTSU 17–14
3	06:54	FIU	Nate Jefferson 7-yard rush (Chase Gabriel kick) (5 plays, 36 yards, 2:06)	FIU 21–17
3	00:28	MTSU	CJ Windham 6-yard pass from Asher O'Hara (Crews Holt kick) (10 plays, 76 yards, 3:15)	MTSU 24–21
3	00:11	FIU	D'vonte Price 65-yard rush (Chase Gabriel kick) (1 play, 65 yards, 0:17)	FIU 28–24
4	01:20	MTSU	Jarrin Pierce 12-yard pass from Asher O'Hara (Crews Holt kick) (8 plays, 59 yards, 3:26)	MTSU 31–28

Statistics	Middle Tennessee	FIU
First downs	23	15
Total yards	404	328
Rushing yards	136	270
Passing yards	268	58
Turnovers	2	1
Time of possession	31:46	28:14

Team	Category	Player	Statistics
Middle Tennessee	Passing	Asher O'Hara	23/42, 268 yards, 2 TDs, 2 INTs
Middle Tennessee	Rushing	Asher O'Hara	23 carries, 106 yards, 2 TDs
Middle Tennessee	Receiving	Jarrin Pierce	5 receptions, 80 yards, 1 TD
FIU	Passing	Kaylan Wiggins	5/15, 37 yards, 1 INT
FIU	Rushing	Shaun Peterson Jr.	15 carries, 117 yards, 2 TDs
FIU	Receiving	Nate Jefferson	2 receptions, 19 yards

=== North Texas ===
North Texas at Middle Tennessee

Team	1	2	3	4	Total
• Mean Green	7	14	21	10	52
Blue Raiders	21	7	0	7	35

- Date: October 17, 2020
- Location: Johnny "Red" Floyd Stadium
  Murfreesboro, TN
- Game start: 4:06 p.m. CDT
- Elapsed time: 3 hours and 21 minutes
- Game attendance: 5,000
- Game weather: 67 °F (19 °C) • Weather: Sunny, nice • Wind: SSE 5 MPH
- Referee: Jonathan Noli
- TV announcers (Stadium): Chris Vosters (play–by–play) and Max Starks (analyst)

Scoring summary
1	08:35	MTSU	Chaton Mobley 3-yard pass from Asher O'Hara (Crews Holt kick) (6 plays, 15 yards, 1:52)	MTSU 7–0
1	06:39	UNT	DeAndre Torrey 1-yard rush (Ethan Mooney kick) (7 plays, 91 yards, 1:50)	TIE 7–7
1	02:23	MTSU	Jarrin Pierce 2-yard pass from Asher O'Hara (Crews Holt kick) (11 plays, 75 yards, 4:16)	MTSU 14–7
1	01:35	MTSU	Gregory Grate Jr. 20-yard fumble returned (Crews Holt kick) (2 plays, -9 yards, 0:40)	MTSU 21–7
2	09:39	UNT	DeAndre Torrey 60-yard rush (Ethan Mooney kick) (5 plays, 99 yards, 1:38)	MTSU 21–14
2	03:58	MTSU	DJ England-Chisolm 24-yard pass from Asher O'Hara (Crews Holt kick) (12 plays, 75 yards, 5:41)	MTSU 28–21
3	13:32	UNT	Jason Bean 48-yard rush (Ethan Mooney kick) (5 plays, 74 yards, 1:22)	TIE 28–28
3	06:44	UNT	Deonte Simpson 9-yard pass from Jason Bean (Ethan Mooney kick) (5 plays, 39 yards, 1:45)	UNT 35–28
3	00:10	UNT	Jaelon Darden 55-yard pass from Jason Bean (Ethan Mooney kick) (5 plays, 79 yards, 1:34)	UNT 42–28
4	11:10	UNT	Jason Bean 48-yard rush (Ethan Mooney kick) (5 plays, 75 yards, 2:24)	UNT 49–28
4	08:40	MTSU	Chaton Mobley 30-yard rush (Crews Holt kick) (5 plays, 71 yards, 2:24)	UNT 49–35
4	03:59	UNT	Ethan Mooney 44-yard field goal (9 plays, 50 yards, 4:31)	UNT 52–35

Statistics	North Texas	Middle Tennessee
First downs	32	23
Total yards	768	432
Rushing yards	462	268
Passing yards	306	164
Turnovers	3	1
Time of possession	27:52	32:08

Team	Category	Player	Statistics
North Texas	Passing	Jason Bean	12/17, 181 yards, 2 TDs
North Texas	Rushing	Jason Bean	10 carries, 169 yards, 3 TDs
North Texas	Receiving	Jaelon Darden	10 receptions, 204 yards, 1 TD
Middle Tennessee	Passing	Asher O'Hara	18/29, 164 yards, 3 TDs, 1 INT
Middle Tennessee	Rushing	Chaton Mobley	14 carries, 156 yards, 1 TD
Middle Tennessee	Receiving	CJ Windham	4 receptions, 49 yards

=== At Rice ===
Middle Tennessee at Rice

Team	1	2	3	4	OT	Total
• Blue Raiders	0	14	17	3	6	40
Owls	6	7	6	14	0	33

- Date: October 24, 2020
- Location: Rice Stadium
  Houston, TX
- Game start: 2:32 p.m. CDT
- Elapsed time: 3 hours and 51 minutes
- Game attendance: 0
- Game weather: 64 °F (18 °C) • Weather: Cloudy • Wind: N 6 MPH
- Referee: Joe Lehring
- TV announcers (ESPN3): David Saltzman (play–by–play) and Taylor McHargue (analyst)

Scoring summary
1	11:11	RICE	Collin Riccitelli 34-yard field goal (8 plays, 63 yards, 3:49)	RICE 3–0
1	04:29	RICE	Collin Riccitelli 45-yard field goal (9 plays, 29 yards, 3:56)	RICE 6–0
2	10:40	MTSU	Yusuf Ali 25-yard pass from Asher O'Hara (Crews Holt kick) (7 plays, 68 yards, 2:22)	MTSU 7–6
2	01:33	RICE	August Pitre III 3-yard pass from Mike Collins (Collin Riccitelli kick) (18 plays, 80 yards, 9:07)	RICE 13–7
2	00:30	MTSU	CJ Windham 21-yard pass from Asher O'Hara (Crews Holt kick) (6 plays, 66 yards, 1:03)	MTSU 14–13
3	11:52	MTSU	Asher O'Hara 2-yard rush (Crews Holt kick) (7 plays, 62 yards, 3:08)	MTSU 21–13
3	07:55	MTSU	Jonathan Butler 32-yard fumble returned (Crews Holt kick) (2 plays, 9 yards, 0:49)	MTSU 28–13
3	05:34	RICE	Austin Trammell 8-yard pass from Mike Collins (two-point pass conversion attempt failed) (5 plays, 65 yards, 2:21)	MTSU 28–19
3	00:00	MTSU	Crews Holt 20-yard field goal (5 plays, 15 yards, 1:52)	MTSU 31–19
4	11:34	RICE	Jack Bradley 22-yard pass from Mike Collins (Collin Riccitelli kick) (6 plays, 83 yards, 3:26)	MTSU 31–26
4	00:34	RICE	Austin Trammell 20-yard pass from Mike Collins (Mike Collins two-point conversion pass to Austin Trammell) (10 plays, 83 yards, 1:50)	RICE 34–31
4	00:00	MTSU	Crews Holt 48-yard field goal (5 plays, 35 yards, 0:34)	TIE 34–34
2OT		MTSU	Asher O'Hara 14-yard rush (4 plays, 25 yards)	MTSU 40–34

Statistics	Middle Tennessee	Rice
First downs	22	26
Total yards	451	425
Rushing yards	118	183
Passing yards	333	242
Turnovers	1	3
Time of possession	27:03	32:57

Team	Category	Player	Statistics
Middle Tennessee	Passing	Asher O'Hara	24/33, 333 yards, 2 TDs
Middle Tennessee	Rushing	Asher O'Hara	22 carries, 69 yards, 2 TDs
Middle Tennessee	Receiving	CJ Windham	7 receptions, 109 yards, 1 TD
Rice	Passing	Mike Collins	18/35, 242 yards, 4 TDs, 1 INT
Rice	Rushing	Juma Otoviano	20 carries, 84 yards
Rice	Receiving	Austin Trammell	3 receptions, 76 yards, 2 TDs

=== At Marshall ===
	1	2	3	4	Total
Blue Raiders	0	7	7	0	14
No. 16 Thundering Herd	7	14	21	0	42

Statistics	MTSU	MRSH
First downs	18	26
Plays–yards	68–303	75–520
Rushes–yards	23–56	38–184
Passing yards	247	336
Passing: comp–att–int	30–45–0	25–37–0
Turnovers		
Time of possession	24:46	35:14

Team	Category	Player	Statistics
Middle Tennessee	Passing	Asher O'Hara	29/44, 241 yards, 1 TD
Middle Tennessee	Rushing	Asher O'Hara	11 carries, 39 yards, 1 TD
Middle Tennessee	Receiving	Jarrin Pierce	9 receptions, 90 yards, 1 TD
Marshall	Passing	Grant Wells	25/37, 336 yards, 5 TD
Marshall	Rushing	Brenden Knox	16 carries, 70 yards
Marshall	Receiving	Willie Johnson	8 receptions, 137 yards, 2 TD

=== At Troy ===
Middle Tennessee at Troy

Team	1	2	3	4	Total
• Blue Raiders	7	10	0	3	20
Trojans	3	7	0	7	17

- Date: November 21, 2020
- Location: Veterans Memorial Stadium
  Troy, AL
- Game start: 2:35 p.m. CST
- Elapsed time: 2 hours and 51 minutes
- Game attendance: 12,000
- Game weather: 72 °F (22 °C) • Weather: Partly Cloudy • Wind: S 5 MPH
- Referee: Marshall Lewis
- TV announcers (ESPN3): Will Kollmeyer (play–by–play) and Ben Stanfield (analyst)

Scoring summary
1	11:20	TROY	Evan Legassey 33-yard field goal (10 plays, 68 yards, 3:40)	TROY 3–0
1	00:56	MTSU	Chaton Mobley 4-yard rush (Crews Holt kick) (11 plays, 66 yards, 5:09)	MTSU 7–3
2	07:45	MTSU	Frank Pleseant 5-yard rush (Crews Holt kick); 11 plays, 71 yards, 5:09)	MTSU 14–3
2	04:29	TROY	B. J. Smith 2-yard rush (Evan Legassey kick); 7 plays, 70 yards, 3:16)	MTSU 14–10
2	00:17	MTSU	Crews Holt 22-yard field goal (13 plays, 70 yards, 4:12)	MTSU 17–10
4	02:37	MTSU	Crews Holt 49-yard field goal (10 plays, 51 yards, 5:20)	MTSU 20–10
4	00:28	TROY	Khalil McClain 8-yard pass from Gunnar Watson (Evan Legassey kick) (11 plays, 85 yards, 2:09)	MTSU 20–17

Statistics	Middle Tennessee	Troy
First downs	23	18
Total yards	396	392
Rushing yards	186	92
Passing yards	210	300
Turnovers	0	2
Time of possession	37:21	22:39

Team	Category	Player	Statistics
Middle Tennessee	Passing	Asher O'Hara	19/23, 210 yards
Middle Tennessee	Rushing	Asher O'Hara	25 carries, 86 yards
Middle Tennessee	Receiving	Yusuf Ali	7 receptions, 90 yards
Troy	Passing	Gunnar Watson	25/39, 300 yards, TD, 2 INTs
Troy	Rushing	B. J. Smith	10 carries, 62 yards, 1 TD
Troy	Receiving	Khalil McClain	6 receptions, 92 yards, 1 TD
