= 2020 Conference USA Football Championship Game =

2020 Ryan Conference USA Football Championship Game
- Conference Championship
UAB Blazers	Marshall Thundering Herd
(5–3)	(7–1)
22	13
Head coach: Bill Clark	Head coach: Doc Holliday
	1	2	3	4	Total
UAB	3	6	0	13	22
Marshall	0	0	7	6	13
- Date: December 18, 2020
- Season: 2020
- Stadium: Joan C. Edwards Stadium
- Location: Huntington, West Virginia
- MVP: Spencer Brown (RB, UAB)
- Favorite: Marshall by 4.5
- Referee: Jon Noli
- Attendance: 8,324

United States TV coverage
- Network: CBSSN
- Announcers: Rich Waltz (play-by-play), Aaron Taylor (analyst) and Jenny Dell (sideline)

2020 Conference USA football standings
	Conf.			Overall
Team	W		L	W		L
East Division
Marshall xy	4	–	1	7	–	3
Florida Atlantic	4	–	2	5	–	4
Western Kentucky	4	–	3	5	–	7
Charlotte	2	–	2	2	–	4
Middle Tennessee	2	–	4	3	–	6
FIU	0	–	3	0	–	5
West Division
UAB xy$	3	–	1	6	–	3
UTSA	5	–	2	7	–	5
Louisiana Tech	4	–	2	5	–	5
North Texas	3	–	4	4	–	6
Rice	2	–	3	2	–	3
Southern Miss	2	–	4	3	–	7
UTEP	0	–	4	3	–	5
Championship: UAB 22, Marshall 13
$ – Conference champion; x – Division champion/co-champions; y – Championship game participant; Note: Due to COVID-19, Old Dominion opted out of the season.

The 2020 Conference USA Football Championship Game was a college football game played on Friday, December 18, 2020, to determine the 2020 champion of Conference USA (C–USA). The game featured the East division champions Marshall Thundering Herd and the West division champions UAB Blazers in the conference's 16th championship game. Sponsored by tax services and consulting firm Ryan LLC, the game was officially known as the Ryan Conference USA Football Championship Game.

== Previous season ==
The 2019 Conference USA Football Championship Game featured the East Division champion Florida Atlantic against the West Division champion UAB. The Owls defeated the Blazers by a score of 49–6.

== Teams ==
The 2020 Conference USA Football Championship Game was contested by the Marshall Thundering Herd, East Division champions, and the UAB Blazers, West Division champions. The teams had met 10 times previously, with the Thundering Herd holding a 8–2 edge in the series. The teams' last meeting was played in 2014; Marshall won, 23–18. The game was the teams' first meeting between the two in the Conference USA Football Championship Game.

=== Marshall ===
Marshall clinched its spot in the championship game on December 9 following the cancelation, due to the COVID-19 pandemic, of their final scheduled game against Charlotte. The cancelation of the game prevented Marshall from winning the division outright on the field; however, according to Conference USA's special tie-breaking criteria for the season, Marshall would win the title even if Florida Atlantic won their final game and had a higher winning percentage in conference games. The need for a tie-breaker was rendered moot when Florida Atlantic lost their final game to Southern Miss on December 10, confirming the Thundering Herd's position in the title game. This was the Thundering Herd's third appearance in the conference title game and first since 2014.

=== UAB ===
UAB clinched its spot to represent the west division in the championship game on December 12, after defeating Rice, 21–16. The Blazers won their third straight division title and became the first team in the conference to play in three consecutive conference championship games.

== Game summary ==
2020 Conference USA Football Championship Game

Quarter	1	2	3	4	Total
UAB	3	6	0	13	22
Marshall	0	0	7	6	13

at Joan C. Edwards Stadium, Huntington, West Virginia

- Date: Friday, December 18, 2020
- Game time: 7:00 p.m. EST
- Game weather: Cloudy • Temperature: 35 °F (2 °C) • Wind: E 2 mph
- Referee: Jon Noli
- TV announcers (CBSSN): Rich Waltz (play-by-play), Aaron Taylor (analyst) and Jenny Dell (sideline)

Game information

First quarter

- (1:45) UAB – Matt Quinn 30 yard field goal (Drive: 11 plays, 64 yards, 6:10; UAB 3–0)

Second quarter

- (11:55) UAB – Hayden Pittman 19 yard pass from Tyler Johnston III, kick failed (Drive: 6 plays, 80 yards, 2:54; UAB 9–0)

Third quarter

- (6:17) MRSH – Artie Henry 7 yard pass from Grant Wells, Shane Ciucci kick (Drive: 6 plays, 49 yards, 2:06; UAB 9–7)

Fourth quarter

- (14:55) UAB – Matt Quinn 42 yard field goal (Drive: 10 plays, 50 yards, 6:22; UAB 12–7)
- (4:55) UAB – Matt Quinn 48 yard field goal (Drive: 12 plays, 40 yards, 6:47; UAB 15–7)
- (4:38) MRSH – Xavier Gaines 70 yard pass from Grant Wells, 2-pt. failed (Drive: 1 play, 70 yards, 0:17; UAB 15–13)
- (4:02) UAB – Trea Shropshire 71 yard pass from Tyler Johnston III, Matt Quinn kick (Drive: 3 plays, 75 yards, 1:36; UAB 22–13)

=== Statistics ===
Statistics	UAB	MRSH
First downs	21	10
Plays–yards	74–468	51–268
Rushes–yards	52–216	27–130
Passing yards	252	138
Passing: comp–att–int	12–22–0	8–24–1
Time of possession	41:26	18:34

Team	Category	Player	Statistics
UAB	Passing	Tyler Johnston III	12/22, 252 yards, 2 TD
UAB	Rushing	Spencer Brown	30 carries, 149 yards
UAB	Receiving	Trea Shropshire	5 receptions, 180 yards, 1 TD
Marshall	Passing	Grant Wells	8/23, 138 yards, 2 TD
Marshall	Rushing	Brenden Knox	17 carries, 67 yards,
Marshall	Receiving	Xavier Gaines	1 reception, 70 yards, 1 TD
