= 2020 UAB Blazers football team =

American college football season

2020 UAB Blazers football

C-USA champion C-USA West Division champion

C-USA Championship Game, W 22–13 vs. Marshall
- Conference: Conference USA
- West Division
- Record: 6–3 (3–1 C-USA)
- Head coach: Bill Clark (5th season)
- Offensive coordinator: Bryant Vincent (4th season)
- Offensive scheme: Spread option
- Defensive coordinator: David Reeves (4th season)
- Base defense: 3–3–5
- Home stadium: Legion Field

2020 Conference USA football standings
| | Conf. | | | Overall |
| Team | W | | L | W | | L |
|---|---|---|---|---|---|---|
East Division
| Marshall xy | 4 | – | 1 | 7 | – | 3 |
| Florida Atlantic | 4 | – | 2 | 5 | – | 4 |
| Western Kentucky | 4 | – | 3 | 5 | – | 7 |
| Charlotte | 2 | – | 2 | 2 | – | 4 |
| Middle Tennessee | 2 | – | 4 | 3 | – | 6 |
| FIU | 0 | – | 3 | 0 | – | 5 |
West Division
| UAB xy$ | 3 | – | 1 | 6 | – | 3 |
| UTSA | 5 | – | 2 | 7 | – | 5 |
| Louisiana Tech | 4 | – | 2 | 5 | – | 5 |
| North Texas | 3 | – | 4 | 4 | – | 6 |
| Rice | 2 | – | 3 | 2 | – | 3 |
| Southern Miss | 2 | – | 4 | 3 | – | 7 |
| UTEP | 0 | – | 4 | 3 | – | 5 |
Championship: UAB 22, Marshall 13
$ – Conference champion; x – Division champion/co-champions; y – Championship game participant; Note: Due to COVID-19, Old Dominion opted out of the season.

The 2020 UAB Blazers football team represented the University of Alabama at Birmingham (UAB) as a member of the West Division in Conference USA (C-USA) during the 2020 NCAA Division I FBS football season. Led by fifth-year head coach Bill Clark, the Blazers compiled an overall record of 6–3 with a mark of 3–1 in conference play, winning C-USA's West Division title. UAB advanced to the C-USA Championship Game, where the Blazers defeated Marshall to capture the conference championship. They accepted a bid to the Gasparilla Bowl, but four days prior to the game, on December 22, the Blazers' opponent, South Carolina, withdrew from the bowl due to COVID-19 issues. As no replacement team was available, the bowl game was subsequently canceled. The team played home games at Legion Field in Birmingham, Alabama.

== Schedule ==
UAB announced its 2020 football schedule on January 8, 2020. The 2020 schedule originally planned consisted of six home and six away games in the regular season. The Blazers had games scheduled against Alabama A&M, New Mexico State, Old Dominion, UTEP, and Middle Tennessee that were canceled due to the COVID-19 pandemic.

| Date | Time | Opponent | Site | TV | Result | Attendance |
|---|---|---|---|---|---|---|
| September 3 | 7:00 p.m. | Central Arkansas* | Legion Field; Birmingham, AL | ESPN3 | W 45–35 | 12,716 |
| September 10 | 8:00 p.m. | at Miami (FL)* | Hard Rock Stadium; Miami, FL | ACCN | L 14–31 | 8,153 |
| September 24 | 6:30 p.m. | at South Alabama* | Hancock Whitney Stadium; Mobile, AL | ESPN | W 42–10 | 5,766 |
| October 3 | 11:30 a.m. | UTSA | Legion Field; Birmingham, AL | Stadium | W 21–13 | 12,547 |
| October 17 | 12:30 p.m. | Western Kentucky | Legion Field; Birmingham, AL | Stadium | W 37–14 | 11,098 |
| October 23 | 7:00 p.m. | Louisiana* | Legion Field; Birmingham, AL | CBSSN | L 20–24 | 11,610 |
| October 31 | 2:30 p.m. | at Louisiana Tech | Joe Aillet Stadium; Ruston, LA | Stadium | L 34–37 ^{2OT} | 7,140 |
| December 12 | 11:00 a.m. | at Rice | Rice Stadium; Houston, TX | ESPN3 | W 21–16 | 2,000 |
| December 18 | 6:00 p.m. | at Marshall | Joan C. Edwards Stadium; Huntington, WV (C-USA Championship Game) | CBSSN | W 22–13 | 8,324 |
| December 26 | 11:00 a.m. | vs. South Carolina | Raymond James Stadium; Tampa, FL (Gasparilla Bowl) | ABC | Cancelled | |
*Non-conference game; Rankings from AP Poll and CFP Rankings after November 24 released prior to game; All times are in Central time

== Rankings ==
Ranking movements Legend: — = Not ranked RV = Received votes
| | Week | | | | | | | | | | | | | | | |
| Poll | Pre | 1 | 2 | 3 | 4 | 5 | 6 | 7 | 8 | 9 | 10 | 11 | 12 | 13 | 14 | Final |
|---|---|---|---|---|---|---|---|---|---|---|---|---|---|---|---|---|
| AP | RV | RV* | RV | | | | | | | | | | | | | |
| Coaches | — | —* | — | | | | | | | | | | | | | |
| CFP | Not released | | | | | | | | | | | | | | | Not released |

== Preseason ==
=== Death of Jamari Smith ===
On May 28, 2020, it was announced that incoming freshman Jamari Smith, from Robert E. Lee High School in Montgomery, Alabama, had drowned while swimming with friends.

=== CUSA media days ===
The CUSA Media Days will be held virtually for the first time in conference history.

== Game summaries ==
=== Central Arkansas ===
Game One – Central Arkansas Bears (0-1) at No. 24 UAB Blazers (1-0)

| Quarter | 1 | 2 | 3 | 4 | Total |
|---|---|---|---|---|---|
| Bears | 7 | 14 | 0 | 14 | 35 |
| #24 Blazers | 14 | 14 | 3 | 14 | 45 |

at Legion Field • Birmingham, Alabama

- Date: Thursday, September 3, 2020
- Game time: 7:00 p.m. CDT
- Game weather: Clear • Temperature: 84 °F (29 °C) • Wind: SSW 5 mph
- TV announcers (ESPN3): Curt Bloom (play-by-play), Chad Pilcher (analyst)
- ESPN NCAA

Game information

First quarter

- (7:03) UAB – Gerrit Prince 6 yard pass from Tyler Johnston III, Matthew Quinn kick (Drive: 12 plays, 73 yards, 5:15; UAB 7–0)
- (2:46) UAB – Spencer Brown 5 yard rush, Matthew Quinn kick (Drive: 9 plays, 55 yards, 3:24; UAB 14–0)
- (0:03) UCA – Cameron Myers 4 yard rush, Hayden Ray kick (Drive: 2 plays, 4 yards, 0:13; UAB 14–7)

Second quarter

- (10:50) UAB – Myron Mitchell 18 yard pass from Bryson Lucero, Matthew Quinn kick (Drive: 5 plays, 55 yards, 2:03; UAB 21–7)
- (5:31) UAB – Gerrit Prince 10 yard pass from Tyler Johnson III, Matthew Quinn kick (Drive: 7 plays, 63 yards, 2:56; UAB 28–7)
- (2:33) UCA – Lujuan Winningham 15 yard pass from Breylin Smith, Chandler Caughron kick (Drive: 1 play, 15 yards, 0:05; UAB 28–14)
- (1:21) UCA – Robert Rochell 35 yard fumble return, Chandler Caughron kick (UAB 28–21)

Third quarter

- (3:07) UAB – Matthew Quinn 23 yard field goal (Drive: 12 plays, 48 yards, 6:51; UAB 31–21)

Fourth quarter

- (12:41) UAB – Lucious Stanley 8 yard rush, Matthew Quinn kick (Drive: 4 plays, 30 yards, 2:10; UAB 38–21)
- (8:12) UAB – Jermaine Brown Jr. 30 yard rush, Matthew Quinn kick (Drive: 4 plays, 43 yards, 2:00; UAB 45–21)
- (5:43) UCA – LuJuan Winningham 8 yard pass from Breylin Smith, Chandler Caughron kick (Drive: 7 plays, 65 yards, 2:29; UAB 45–28)
- (0:32) UCA – Sam Camargo 6 yard pass from Breylin Smith, Chandler Caughron kick (Drive: 10 plays, 83 yards, 2:40; UAB 45–35)

| Statistics | UCA | UAB |
|---|---|---|
| First downs | 20 | 29 |
| Plays–yards | 66–293 | 83–459 |
| Rushes–yards | 21–100 | 49–233 |
| Passing yards | 193 | 226 |
| Passing: comp–att–int | 25–46–1 | 24–34–1 |
| Time of possession | 22:55 | 37:05 |

| Team | Category | Player | Statistics |
|---|---|---|---|
| Central Arkansas | Passing | Breylin Smith | 25/46, 193 yards, 3 TD, 1 INT |
| Central Arkansas | Rushing | Kierre Crossley | 10 carries, 59 yards |
| Central Arkansas | Receiving | Lujuan Winningham | 6 receptions, 53 yards, 2 TD |
| UAB | Passing | Tyler Johnston III | 17/25, 143 yards, 2 TD, 1 INT |
| UAB | Rushing | Spencer Brown | 24 carries, 127 yards, 1 TD |
| UAB | Receiving | Austin Watkins | 7 receptions, 72 yards |

=== At Miami ===
Game Two – UAB Blazers (1–0) at Miami Hurricanes (0–0)

| Quarter | 1 | 2 | 3 | 4 | Total |
|---|---|---|---|---|---|
| Blazers | 7 | 0 | 7 | 0 | 14 |
| Hurricanes | 7 | 7 | 17 | 0 | 31 |

at Hard Rock Stadium • Miami Gardens, Florida

- Date: Thursday, September 10, 2020
- Game time: 7:00 p.m. CDT
- Game weather: Clear • Temperature: 82 °F (28 °C) • Wind: ENE 5 mph
- TV announcers (ACC Network): Dave O'Brien (play-by-play), Tim Hasselbeck (analyst), Katie George (sideline)

Game information

First quarter

- (2:40) UAB – Austin Watkins 16 yard pass from Tyler Johnston III, Matthew Quinn kick (Drive: 2 plays, 17 yards, 0:44; UAB 7–0)
- (1:04) MIA – Cam'Ron Harris 66 yard rush, José Borregales kick (Drive: 4 plays, 75 yards, 1:36; Tied 7–7)

Second quarter

- (10:04) MIA – D'Eriq King 12 yard rush, José Borregales kick (Drive: 6 plays, 64 yards, 2:16; Miami 14–7)

Third quarter

- (10:15) MIA – José Borregales 25 yard field goal (Drive: 11 plays, 66 yards, 4:45; Miami 17–7)
- (6:19) UAB – Spencer Brown 6 yard rush, Matthew Quinn kick (Drive: 9 plays, 75 yards, 3:56; Miami 17–14)
- (4:02) MIA – Cam'Ron Harris 4 yard rush, José Borregales kick (Drive: 7 plays, 71 yards, 2:17; Miami 24–14)
- (0:00) MIA – Brevin Jordan 4 yard pass from D'Eriq King, José Borregales kick (Drive: 7 plays, 75 yards, 2:42; Miami 31–14)

Fourth quarter
No scoring

| Statistics | UAB | MIA |
|---|---|---|
| First downs | 14 | 25 |
| Plays–yards | 61–285 | 78–495 |
| Rushes–yards | 26–80 | 52–337 |
| Passing yards | 205 | 158 |
| Passing: comp–att–int | 19–35–0 | 18–27–0 |
| Time of possession | 29:04 | 30:56 |

| Team | Category | Player | Statistics |
|---|---|---|---|
| UAB | Passing | Tyler Johnston III | 15/23, 150 yards, 1 TD |
| UAB | Rushing | Spencer Brown | 16 carries, 74 yards, 1 TD |
| UAB | Receiving | Myron Mitchell | 8 receptions, 117 yards |
| Miami | Passing | D'Eriq King | 16/24, 144 yards, 1 TD |
| Miami | Rushing | Cam'Ron Harris | 17 carries, 134 yards, 2 TD |
| Miami | Receiving | Brevin Jordan | 3 receptions, 51 yards, 1 TD |

=== At South Alabama ===
| | 1 | 2 | 3 | 4 | Total |
|---|---|---|---|---|---|
| Blazers | 14 | 14 | 0 | 14 | 42 |
| Jaguars | 0 | 10 | 0 | 0 | 10 |

| Statistics | UAB | South Alabama |
|---|---|---|
| First downs | 22 | 18 |
| Total yards | 509 | 315 |
| Rushing yards | 190 | 147 |
| Passing yards | 319 | 168 |
| Turnovers | 1 | 2 |
| Time of possession | 35:00 | 25:00 |

| Team | Category | Player | Statistics |
|---|---|---|---|
| UAB | Passing | Bryson Lucero | 18/28, 319 yards, 2 TDs |
| UAB | Rushing | Spencer Brown | 20 carries, 105 yards, 3 TDs |
| UAB | Receiving | Austin Watkins | 7 receptions, 183 yards, 1 TD |
| South Alabama | Passing | Chance Lovertich | 14/29, 168 yards, 1 TD, 1 INT |
| South Alabama | Rushing | Carlos Davis | 17 carries, 105 yards |
| South Alabama | Receiving | Jalen Tolbert | 3 receptions, 59 yards, 1 TD |

=== UTSA ===
| | 1 | 2 | 3 | 4 | Total |
|---|---|---|---|---|---|
| Roadrunners | 3 | 3 | 0 | 7 | 13 |
| Blazers | 7 | 7 | 7 | 0 | 21 |

| Statistics | UTSA | UAB |
|---|---|---|
| First downs | 17 | 21 |
| Total yards | 280 | 409 |
| Rushing yards | 190 | 214 |
| Passing yards | 90 | 195 |
| Turnovers | 1 | 4 |
| Time of possession | 26:53 | 33:07 |

| Team | Category | Player | Statistics |
|---|---|---|---|
| UTSA | Passing | Jordan Weeks | 7/19, 57 yards, 1 INT |
| UTSA | Rushing | Sincere McCormick | 22 carries, 150 yards, 1 TD |
| UTSA | Receiving | Joshua Cephus | 3 receptions, 42 yards |
| UAB | Passing | Bryson Lucero | 18/29, 195 yards, 3 TDs, 3 INTs |
| UAB | Rushing | Spencer Brown | 26 carries, 144 yards |
| UAB | Receiving | Myron Mitchell | 6 receptions, 64 yards, 1 TD |

=== Western Kentucky ===
| | 1 | 2 | 3 | 4 | Total |
|---|---|---|---|---|---|
| Hilltoppers | 7 | 7 | 0 | 0 | 14 |
| Blazers | 10 | 14 | 10 | 3 | 37 |

| Statistics | Western Kentucky | UAB |
|---|---|---|
| First downs | 15 | 17 |
| Total yards | 250 | 358 |
| Rushing yards | 88 | 217 |
| Passing yards | 162 | 141 |
| Turnovers | 4 | 2 |
| Time of possession | 28:33 | 31:27 |

| Team | Category | Player | Statistics |
|---|---|---|---|
| Western Kentucky | Passing | Kevaris Thomas | 16/35, 162 yards, 2 TDs, 2 INTs |
| Western Kentucky | Rushing | Jakairi Moses | 6 carries, 41 yards |
| Western Kentucky | Receiving | Joshua Simon | 6 receptions, 81 yards, 1 TD |
| UAB | Passing | Bryson Lucero | 15/31, 141 yards, 1 TD, 1 INT |
| UAB | Rushing | DeWayne McBride | 10 carries, 131 yards, 1 TD |
| UAB | Receiving | Austin Watkins | 7 receptions, 55 yards, 1 TD |

=== Louisiana ===
| | 1 | 2 | 3 | 4 | Total |
|---|---|---|---|---|---|
| Ragin' Cajuns | 0 | 10 | 7 | 7 | 24 |
| Blazers | 3 | 10 | 7 | 0 | 20 |

| Statistics | Louisiana | UAB |
|---|---|---|
| First downs | 17 | 17 |
| Total yards | 286 | 285 |
| Rushing yards | 134 | 175 |
| Passing yards | 152 | 110 |
| Turnovers | 0 | 2 |
| Time of possession | 30:37 | 29:23 |

| Team | Category | Player | Statistics |
|---|---|---|---|
| Louisiana | Passing | Levi Lewis | 12/20, 152 yards, 2 TDS |
| Louisiana | Rushing | Elijah Mitchell | 21 carries, 67 yards |
| Louisiana | Receiving | Kyren Lacy | 2 receptions, 43 yards |
| UAB | Passing | Bryson Lucero | 10/23, 110 yards, 2 INTs |
| UAB | Rushing | Spencer Brown | 28 carries, 128 yards, 2 TDs |
| UAB | Receiving | Ryan Davis | 2 receptions, 34 yards |

=== At Louisiana Tech ===
| | 1 | 2 | 3 | 4 | OT | 2OT | Total |
|---|---|---|---|---|---|---|---|
| Blazers | 0 | 14 | 17 | 0 | 3 | 0 | 34 |
| Bulldogs | 3 | 14 | 0 | 14 | 3 | 3 | 37 |

| Statistics | UAB | Louisiana Tech |
|---|---|---|
| First downs | 20 | 20 |
| Total yards | 485 | 381 |
| Rushing yards | 338 | 49 |
| Passing yards | 147 | 332 |
| Turnovers | 3 | 1 |
| Time of possession | 32:44 | 27:16 |

| Team | Category | Player | Statistics |
|---|---|---|---|
| UAB | Passing | Tyler Johnston III | 4/9, 81 yards |
| UAB | Rushing | Spencer Brown | 29 carries, 140 yards, 2 TDs |
| UAB | Receiving | Austin Watkins Jr. | 6 receptions, 95 yards |
| Louisiana Tech | Passing | Aaron Allen | 18/26, 191 yards, 2 TDs |
| Louisiana Tech | Rushing | Israel Tucker | 17 carries, 54 yards |
| Louisiana Tech | Receiving | Adrian Hardy | 7 receptions, 101 yards, 2 TDs |

=== At Rice ===
| | 1 | 2 | 3 | 4 | Total |
|---|---|---|---|---|---|
| Blazers | 0 | 7 | 14 | 0 | 21 |
| Owls | 3 | 10 | 0 | 3 | 16 |

| Statistics | UAB | Rice |
|---|---|---|
| First downs | 13 | 20 |
| Total yards | 354 | 232 |
| Rushing yards | 137 | 66 |
| Passing yards | 217 | 166 |
| Turnovers | 0 | 1 |
| Time of possession | 22:42 | 37:18 |

| Team | Category | Player | Statistics |
|---|---|---|---|
| UAB | Passing | Tyler Johnson III | 9/18, 217 yards, 2 TDs |
| UAB | Rushing | Tyler Johnson III | 7 carries, 41 yards |
| UAB | Receiving | Myron Mitchell | 1 reception, 63 yards, 1 TD |
| Rice | Passing | JoVoni Johnson | 17/23, 139 yards, 1 TD |
| Rice | Rushing | Khalan Griffin | 14 carries, 34 yards |
| Rice | Receiving | Jake Bailey | 7 receptions, 72 yards |

=== at Marshall (Conference USA Championship) ===
Game Nine – UAB Blazers at Marshall Thundering Herd (Conference USA Championship)

| Quarter | 1 | 2 | 3 | 4 | Total |
|---|---|---|---|---|---|
| Blazers | 3 | 6 | 0 | 13 | 22 |
| Thundering Herd | 0 | 0 | 7 | 6 | 13 |

at Joan C. Edwards Stadium • Huntington, West Virginia

- Date: Saturday, December 18, 2020
- Game time: 7:00 p.m. EST
- Game weather: Cloudy • Temperature: 34 °F (1 °C) • Wind: W 3 MPH
- Game attendance: 8,324
- Referee: Jon Noli
- TV announcers (CBSSN): Rich Waltz (play-by-play), Aaron Taylor (analyst) and Jenny Dell (sideline)

Game information

First quarter

- (1:45) UAB – Matt Quinn 30-yard field goal (Drive: 11 plays, 64 yards, 6:10; UAB 3–0)

Second quarter

- (11:55) UAB – Hayden Pittman 19-yard pass from Tyler Johnston III, Matt Quinn kick failed (Drive: 6 plays, 80 yards, 2:54; UAB 9–0)

Third quarter

- (6:17) MRSH – Artie Henry 7-yard pass from Grant Wells, Shane Ciucci kick (Drive: 6 plays, 49 yards, 2:06; UAB 9–7)

Fourth quarter

- (14:55) UAB – Matt Quinn 42-yard field goal (Drive: 10 plays, 50 yards, 6:22; UAB 12–7)
- (5:55) UAB – Matt Quinn 48-yard field goal (Drive: 12 plays, 40 yards, 6:47; UAB 15–7)
- (5:38) MRSH – Xavier Gaines 70-yard pass from Grant Wells, Grant Wells pass failed (Drive: 1 play, 70 yards, 0:17; UAB 15–13)
- (4:02) UAB – Trea Shropshire 71-yard pass from T Johnston III, Matt Quinn kick (Drive: 3 plays, 75 yards, 1:36; UAB 22–13)

| Statistics | UAB | MRSH |
|---|---|---|
| First downs | 21 | 10 |
| Plays–yards | 74–468 | 51–268 |
| Rushes–yards | 52–216 | 27–130 |
| Passing yards | 252 | 138 |
| Passing: comp–att–int | 12–22–0 | 8–24–1 |
| Time of possession | 41:26 | 18:34 |

| Team | Category | Player | Statistics |
|---|---|---|---|
| UAB | Passing | Tyler Johnston III | 12/22, 252 yards, 2 TD |
| UAB | Rushing | Spencer Brown | 30 carries, 149 yards |
| UAB | Receiving | Trea Shropshire | 5 receptions, 180 yards, TD |
| Marshall | Passing | Grant Wells | 8/23, 138 yards, 2 TD |
| Marshall | Rushing | Brenden Knox | 17 carries, 67 yards |
| Marshall | Receiving | Xavier Gaines | 1 reception, 70 yards, TD |

== Players drafted into the NFL ==
| Round | Pick | Player | Position | NFL club |
|---|---|---|---|---|
| 4 | 121 | Jordan Smith | DE | Jacksonville Jaguars |
