= 2020 Old Dominion Monarchs football team =

Cancelled American college football season

2020 Old Dominion Monarchs football
- Conference: Conference USA
- East Division
- Record: 0–0 (0–0 C-USA)
- Head coach: Ricky Rahne (1st season)
- Offensive coordinator: Kirk Campbell (1st season)
- Defensive coordinator: Blake Seiler (1st season)
- Home stadium: S.B. Ballard Stadium

2020 Conference USA football standings
	Conf.			Overall
Team	W		L	W		L
East Division
Marshall xy	4	–	1	7	–	3
Florida Atlantic	4	–	2	5	–	4
Western Kentucky	4	–	3	5	–	7
Charlotte	2	–	2	2	–	4
Middle Tennessee	2	–	4	3	–	6
FIU	0	–	3	0	–	5
West Division
UAB xy$	3	–	1	6	–	3
UTSA	5	–	2	7	–	5
Louisiana Tech	4	–	2	5	–	5
North Texas	3	–	4	4	–	6
Rice	2	–	3	2	–	3
Southern Miss	2	–	4	3	–	7
UTEP	0	–	4	3	–	5
Championship: UAB 22, Marshall 13
$ – Conference champion; x – Division champion/co-champions; y – Championship game participant; Note: Due to COVID-19, Old Dominion opted out of the season.

The 2020 Old Dominion Monarchs football team would have represented Old Dominion University in the 2020 NCAA Division I FBS football season, being slated to compete in the East Division of Conference USA (C-USA). On August 10, the university canceled its football season, as well as all other fall sports competitions, due to the complications of the COVID-19 pandemic. The Monarchs would have been led by first-year head coach Ricky Rahne and would have played their home games at S.B. Ballard Stadium in Norfolk, Virginia.

== Coaching changes ==
Following a finish of 1–11 overall and 0–8 in conference play from their previous season, head coach Bobby Wilder resigned from his duties as the first head coach for Old Dominion's re-established football program.

In December 2019, Old Dominion hired Penn State offensive coordinator Ricky Rahne to become the team's next head coach. In January 2020, Rahne recruited new coaching staff consisting of offensive coordinator Kirk Campbell, special teams coordinator Kevin Smith, and defensive coordinator Blake Seiler.

== Preseason ==
=== Award watch lists ===
Listed in the order that they were released.

Award	Player	Position	Year
Bednarik Award	Keion White (Note: White was not listed on the 2020 football roster due to entering the NCAA transfer portal in October 2020.)	DE	JR
Jim Thorpe Award	Kaleb Ford-Dement	CB	JR
Wuerffel Trophy	Isaac Weaver	C	SR

=== C-USA media days ===
The C-USA Media Days were held virtually for the first time in conference history.

== Schedule ==
Old Dominion's original schedule was announced on January 8, 2020, consisting of 7 home games and 5 away games. Of the opponents scheduled, Hampton and UConn would eventually cancel their 2020 football seasons.

Date	Opponent	Site	Result
September 4	Wake Forest*	S.B. Ballard Stadium; Norfolk, VA	Cancelled
September 12	Hampton*	S.B. Ballard Stadium; Norfolk, VA	Cancelled
September 19	FIU	S.B. Ballard Stadium; Norfolk, VA	Cancelled
September 26	Middle Tennessee	S.B. Ballard Stadium; Norfolk, VA	Cancelled
October 3	at UConn*	Rentschler Field; East Hartford, CT	Cancelled
October 17	at UTSA	Alamodome; San Antonio, TX	Cancelled
October 24	Virginia*	S.B. Ballard Stadium; Norfolk, VA	Cancelled
October 31	at Western Kentucky	Smith Stadium; Bowling Green, KY	Cancelled
November 7	UAB	S.B. Ballard Stadium; Norfolk, VA	Cancelled
November 14	at Charlotte	Jerry Richardson Stadium; Charlotte, NC	Cancelled
November 21	at Florida Atlantic	FAU Stadium; Boca Raton, FL	Cancelled
November 28	Marshall	S.B. Ballard Stadium; Norfolk, VA	Cancelled

- Asterisk (*) indicates non-conference opponent

== Roster ==
The 2020 roster if Old Dominion had played for the 2020 season.

2020 Old Dominion Monarchs football team roster
Players
Coaches
Offense

Pos.	#	Name	Class
RB	2	Blake Watson	So
WR	3	Frederik Antoine	Fr
QB	4	Stone Smartt	Sr
WR	6	Nigel Fitzgerald	So
WR	10	Isiah Paige	Fr
QB	11	Hayden Wolff	Fr
RB	12	Elijah Davis	So
QB	14	Dominique Anthony	Fr
QB	15	Reese Poffenbarger	Fr
WR	16	Aaron Moore	So
WR	18	Noah Robinson	Fr
WR	19	Cornell Hendrick Jr	So
RB	20	Keshawn Wicks	Fr
WR	28	Javon Harvey	Fr
RB	29	Obie Sanni	Fr
WR	30	Rafael McCoy	Fr
RB	44	Matt Geiger	Jr
RB	46	Elijah Rivers	Fr
OL	53	Khadere Kounta	So
OL	60	Joshua Bennett	Fr
OL	62	Tyler Lamar	Fr
OL	63	Xavier Black	Fr
OL	64	Nick Saldiveri	So
OL	68	Brandon Ruff	Fr
OL	70	Jack Hassard	So
OL	71	Isaac Weaver	Sr
OL	72	Talyn Hunter	Fr
OL	73	Austin Mosier	Fr
OL	74	Santana Saunders	Fr
OL	76	Jack Miller III	Jr
OL	77	Kyle Young	So
OL	79	Leroy Thomas	So
WR	81	Devin Lester	Fr
TE	82	AC White	So
TE	83	Isaiah Spencer	So
TE	84	Donta Anthony Jr.	Jr
TE	85	Trey Lancaster	Fr
WR	86	Darius Savedge	So
WR	87	Braxton Collins	Fr

Defense

Pos.	#	Name	Class
LB	0	Malcolm Britt	Fr
CB	1	Lance Boykin	Jr
LB	3	Jordan Young	Sr
CB	4	LaMareon James	Fr
CB	5	Will Brocchini	Sr
S	7	Harrell Blackmon	Sr
LB	8	Ryan Henry	Jr
CB	10	Tre Hawkins	Jr
S	11	Levi Wentz	Fr
S	13	Terry Jones	Fr
S	14	Justinn Richardson	Jr
S	15	Tyrik McDaniel	Fr
CB	17	Damion Charity	So
DE	19	Amorie Morrison	Fr
DT	20	Aaron Jackson	Sr
S	21	R'Tarriun Johnson	Jr
CB	22	Kaleb Ford-Dement	Jr
CB	23	Geronda Hall	Jr
S	24	Joe Joe Headen	Sr
LB	25	Steven Williams	Jr
CB	26	Jalen Lomax	Fr
S	28	Corey Chapman	Fr
DE	29	Adrian Spellman	Fr
LB	32	Joshua Burdsall	Fr
CB	34	Ali Ali	Fr
S	35	Luke Lindenfeldar	Fr
LB	36	Alec Solano	So
S	38	Colten Hicks	Fr
DE	39	Roman Ridley	Fr
DE	41	Cory Jackson	Sr
LB	48	Estefano Feliciano Jr.	Jr
DT	50	Alonzo Ford Jr.	Fr
DT	51	Carson Ramos	Jr
DT	52	Chazz Wallace	Fr
DT	54	Jeremy Meiser	Sr
DT	56	Sokoya McDuffie	So
DT	92	Tyre Bibby	Jr
DE	94	O'Shea Jackson	So
DT	96	Keyshawn Hunter	Fr
DE	97	Marcus Haynes	Jr

Special teams

Pos.	#	Name	Class
K	37	Dominik Soos	Jr
LS	43	Bryant Worrell	Fr
LS	49	John Morton	Fr
LS	91	B.R. Hatcher	Jr
P	95	Ethan Dunne	Fr
K	98	Nick Rice	Sr

Head coach

- Ricky Rahne

Coordinators/assistant coaches

- Kirk Campbell
  Offensive coordinator/quarterbacks
- Blake Seiler
  Defensive coordinator/inside linebackers
- Tony Lucas
  Running backs
- Jonathan Decoster
  Tight ends
- Mark Dupuis
  Wide receivers
- Kevin Reihner
  Offensive line
- Leon Wright
  Cornerbacks
- Remington Rebstock
  Safeties
- Kevin Smith
  Special teams coordinator/outside linebackers

Legend

- (C) Team captain
- (S) Suspended
- (I) Ineligible
- Injured
- Redshirt

Roster
Last update: March 6, 2024
