= 2020 FIU Panthers football team =

American college football season

2020 FIU Panthers football
- Conference: Conference USA
- East Division
- Record: 0–5 (0–3 C-USA)
- Head coach: Butch Davis (4th season)
- Offensive coordinator: Rich Skrosky (4th season)
- Offensive scheme: Multiple
- Co-defensive coordinators: Jeff Copp (2nd season); Jerod Kruse (2nd season)
- Base defense: 4–3
- Home stadium: Riccardo Silva Stadium

2020 Conference USA football standings
	Conf.			Overall
Team	W		L	W		L
East Division
Marshall xy	4	–	1	7	–	3
Florida Atlantic	4	–	2	5	–	4
Western Kentucky	4	–	3	5	–	7
Charlotte	2	–	2	2	–	4
Middle Tennessee	2	–	4	3	–	6
FIU	0	–	3	0	–	5
West Division
UAB xy$	3	–	1	6	–	3
UTSA	5	–	2	7	–	5
Louisiana Tech	4	–	2	5	–	5
North Texas	3	–	4	4	–	6
Rice	2	–	3	2	–	3
Southern Miss	2	–	4	3	–	7
UTEP	0	–	4	3	–	5
Championship: UAB 22, Marshall 13
$ – Conference champion; x – Division champion/co-champions; y – Championship game participant; Note: Due to COVID-19, Old Dominion opted out of the season.

The 2020 FIU Panthers football team represented Florida International University (FIU) in the 2020 NCAA Division I FBS football season. The Panthers played their home games at Riccardo Silva Stadium in Miami, Florida, and competed in the East Division of Conference USA (C-USA). They were led by fourth-year head coach Butch Davis. The season was notably truncated due to several cancellations stemming from the effects of the worldwide COVID-19 pandemic.

== Schedule ==
This years season intended to feature nine games. FIU had scheduled Old Dominion and UMass, which were canceled. Both schools would not play football in the fall over concerns related to the COVID-19 pandemic. Although UMass reversed their decision they intend to schedule and play a limited number of football games this fall. UCF was also scheduled for September 12, 2020 but later called off due to FIU choosing to resume athletics on September 16, 2020. On November 3, 2020, the game against UTEP was canceled due to positive testing of COVID-19.

Date	Time	Opponent	Site	TV	Result	Attendance
September 26	1:00 p.m.	at Liberty*	Williams Stadium; Lynchburg, VA	ESPNU	L 34–36	1,000
October 10	4:00 p.m.	Middle Tennessee	Riccardo Silva Stadium; Miami, FL	ESPNU	L 28–31	2,213
October 23	7:00 p.m.	Jacksonville State*	Riccardo Silva Stadium; Miami, FL	ESPN3	L 10–19	1,041
November 13	7:00 p.m.	Florida Atlantic	Riccardo Silva Stadium; Miami, FL (Shula Bowl)	CBSSN	L 19–38	1,512
November 21	2:00 p.m.	at Western Kentucky	Houchens Industries–L. T. Smith Stadium; Bowling Green, KY	ESPN3	L 21–38	3,823
*Non-conference game; Rankings from AP Poll and CFP Rankings after November 24 released prior to game; All times are in Eastern time

Schedule source:

== Game summaries ==
=== At Liberty ===
Florida International at Liberty

Team	1	2	3	4	Total
Panthers	14	0	14	6	34
• Flames	14	0	13	9	36

- Date: September 26, 2020
- Location: Williams Stadium
  Lynchburg, VA
- Game start: 1:05 p.m. EDT
- Elapsed time: 3 hours and 19 minutes
- Game attendance: 1,000
- Game weather: 72 °F (22 °C) • Weather: Cloudy • Wind: 3 E MPH
- Referee: Riley Johnson
- TV announcers (ESPNU): Matt Warner (play–by–play), Joe Jauch (analyst), and Emily Austen (sideline reporter)

Scoring summary
1	14:51	FIU	Lexington Joseph 100-yard kickoff returned (Chase Gabriel kick) (0 plays, 0 yards, 0:09)	FIU 7–0
1	12:40	LIB	Noah Fritch 24-yard pass from Malik Willis (Alex Barbir kick) (5 plays, 75 yards, 2:11)	TIE 7–7
1	05:20	LIB	Peyton Pickett 2-yard rush (Alex Barbir kick) (10 plays, 57 yards, 5:51)	LIB 14–7
1	02:16	FIU	D'vonte Price 30-yard rush (Chase Gabriel kick) (8 plays, 82 yards, 3:04)	TIE 14–14
3	12:26	LIB	Alex Barbir 27-yard field goal (6 plays, 66 yards, 2:34)	LIB 17–14
3	08:37	LIB	DJ Stubbs 14-yard pass from Malik Willis (Alex Barbir kick) (6 plays, 61 yards, 2:23)	LIB 24–14
3	08:02	FIU	D'vonte Price 65-yard rush (Chase Gabriel kick) (2 plays, 79 yards, 0:35)	LIB 24–21
3	04:35	LIB	Alex Barbir 21-yard field goal (9 plays, 72 yards, 3:27)	LIB 27–21
3	01:42	FIU	Bryce Singelton 45-yard pass from Stone Norton (Chase Gabriel kick) (7 plays, 75 yards, 2:53)	FIU 28–27
4	12:27	LIB	Joshua Mack 2-yard rush (two-point conversion rush attempt failed) (9 plays, 75 yards, 4:15)	LIB 33–28
4	06:32	LIB	Alex Barbir 27-yard field goal (7 plays, 73 yards, 3:12)	LIB 36–28
4	04:30	FIU	D'vonte Price 6-yard pass from Stone Norton (two-point conversion pass attempt failed) (4 plays, 33 yards, 2:02)	LIB 36–34

Statistics	FIU	Liberty
First downs	16	31
Total yards	304	527
Rushing yards	168	219
Passing yards	136	308
Turnovers	0	0
Time of possession	22:39	37:21

Team	Category	Player	Statistics
FIU	Passing	Stone Norton	9/13, 120 yards, 2 TDs
FIU	Rushing	D'Vonte Price	13 carries, 148 yards, 2 TDs
FIU	Receiving	Bryce Singleton	2 receptions, 50 yards, 1 TD
Liberty	Passing	Malik Willis	24/30, 285 yards, 2 TDs
Liberty	Rushing	Joshua Mack	13 carries, 107 yards, 1 TD
Liberty	Receiving	DJ Stubbs	8 receptions, 119 yards, 1 TD

=== Middle Tennessee ===
Middle Tennessee at Florida International

Team	1	2	3	4	Total
• Blue Raiders	0	17	7	7	31
Panthers	7	7	14	0	28

- Date: October 10, 2020
- Location: Riccardo Silva Stadium
  Miami, FL
- Game start: 4:02 p.m. EDT
- Elapsed time: 3 hours and 31 minutes
- Game attendance: 2,213
- Game weather: 89 °F (32 °C) • Weather: Partly Cloudy • Wind: NE 10 MPH
- Referee: Kevin Randall
- TV announcers (ESPNU): Clay Matvick (play–by–play) and Rocky Boiman (analyst)

Scoring summary
1	12:09	FIU	Shaun Peterson Jr. 1-yard rush (Chase Gabriel kick) (4 plays, 23 yards, 1:41)	FIU 7–0
2	13:57	MTSU	Asher O'Hara 4-yard rush (Crews Holt kick) (12 plays, 80 yards, 5:20)	TIE 7–7
2	09:09	MTSU	Asher O'Hara 1-yard rush (Crews Holt kick) (5 plays, 64 yards, 1:38)	MTSU 14–7
2	08:53	FIU	Shaun Peterson Jr. 63-yard rush (Chase Gabriel kick) (1 play, 78 yards, 0:16)	TIE 14–14
2	00:53	MTSU	Crews Holt 44-yard field goal (9 plays, 46 yards, 3:42)	MTSU 17–14
3	06:54	FIU	Nate Jefferson 7-yard rush (Chase Gabriel kick) (5 plays, 36 yards, 2:06)	FIU 21–17
3	00:28	MTSU	CJ Windham 6-yard pass from Asher O'Hara (Crews Holt kick) (10 plays, 76 yards, 3:15)	MTSU 24–21
3	00:11	FIU	D'vonte Price 65-yard rush (Chase Gabriel kick) (1 play, 65 yards, 0:17)	FIU 28–24
4	01:20	MTSU	Jarrin Pierce 12-yard pass from Asher O'Hara (Crews Holt kick) (8 plays, 59 yards, 3:26)	MTSU 31–28

Statistics	Middle Tennessee	FIU
First downs	23	15
Total yards	404	328
Rushing yards	136	270
Passing yards	268	58
Turnovers	2	1
Time of possession	31:46	28:14

Team	Category	Player	Statistics
Middle Tennessee	Passing	Asher O'Hara	23/42, 268 yards, 2 TDs, 2 INTs
Middle Tennessee	Rushing	Asher O'Hara	23 carries, 106 yards, 2 TDs
Middle Tennessee	Receiving	Jarrin Pierce	5 receptions, 80 yards, 1 TD
FIU	Passing	Kaylan Wiggins	5/15, 37 yards, 1 INT
FIU	Rushing	Shaun Peterson Jr.	15 carries, 117 yards, 2 TDs
FIU	Receiving	Nate Jefferson	2 receptions, 19 yards

=== Jacksonville State ===
Jacksonville State at Florida International

Team	1	2	3	4	Total
• Gamecocks	3	10	3	3	19
Panthers	3	0	7	0	10

- Date: October 23, 2020
- Location: Riccardo Silva Stadium
  Miami, FL
- Game start: 7:00 p.m. EDT
- Elapsed time: 3 hours
- Game attendance: 1,041
- Game weather: 86 °F (30 °C) • Weather: Mostly Cloudy • Wind: E 10 MPH
- Referee: Jonathan Noli
- TV announcers (ESPN3): A. J. Ricketts (play–by–play) and Cam Lynch (analyst)

Scoring summary
1	09:45	FIU	Chase Gabriel 37-yard field goal (6 plays, 20 yards, 2:10)	FIU 3–0
1	05:58	JSU	Alen Karajic 30-yard field goal (10 plays, 62 yards, 3:47)	TIE 3–3
2	11:43	JSU	Josh Samuel 2-yard rush (Alen Karajic kick) (14 plays, 98 yards, 7:32)	JSU 10–3
2	02:08	JSU	Alen Karajic 39-yard field goal (12 plays, 55 yards, 6:35)	JSU 13–3
3	09:53	JSU	Alen Karajic 20-yard field goal (11 plays, 72 yards, 5:07)	JSU 16–3
3	02:28	FIU	Nate Jefferson 6-yard pass from Stone Norton (Chase Gabriel kick) (7 plays, 63 yards, 3:00)	JSU 16–10
4	02:35	JSU	Alen Karajic 23-yard field goal (14 plays, 66 yards, 7:22)	JSU 19–10

Statistics	Jacksonville State	FIU
First downs	26	6
Total yards	444	156
Rushing yards	285	72
Passing yards	159	84
Turnovers	0	1
Time of possession	42:16	17:44

Team	Category	Player	Statistics
Jacksonville State	Passing	Zion Webb	12/17, 103 yards
Jacksonville State	Rushing	Josh Samuel	25 carries, 163 yards, 1 TD
Jacksonville State	Receiving	Ahmad Edwards	3 receptions, 62 yards
FIU	Passing	Stone Norton	5/14, 66 yards, 1 TD
FIU	Rushing	D'Vonte Price	9 carries, 43 yards
FIU	Receiving	Nate Jefferson	2 receptions, 38 yards, 1 TD

=== Florida Atlantic ===
Florida Atlantic at Florida International

Team	1	2	3	4	Total
• Owls	7	17	0	14	38
Panthers	0	10	0	9	19

- Date: November 13, 2020
- Location: Riccardo Silva Stadium
  Miami, FL
- Game start: 7:00 p.m. EST
- Elapsed time: 3 hours and 26 minutes
- Game attendance: 1,512
- Game weather: 79 °F (26 °C) • Weather: Overcast • Wind: ENE 7 MPH
- Referee: Chris Bynum
- TV announcers (CBS Sports Network): John Sadak (play–by–play) and Randy Cross (analyst)

Scoring summary
1	11:35	FAU	LaJohntay Wester 11-yard pass from Javion Posey (Vladimir Rivas kick) (8 plays, 75 yards, 3:25)	FAU 7–0
2	13:17	FAU	Vladimir Rivas 43-yard field goal (9 plays, 48 yards, 3:07)	FAU 10–0
2	13:01	FIU	D'Vonte Price 77-yard rush (Chase Gabriel kick) (1 play, 77 yards, 0:16)	FAU 10–7
2	11:11	FIU	Chase Gabriel 41-yard field goal (4 plays, 4 yards, 1:42)	TIE 10–10
2	09:52	FAU	Malcolm Davidson 37-yard rush (Vladimir Rivas kick) (4 plays, 75 yards, 1:19)	FAU 17–10
2	01:41	FAU	Brandon Robinson 5-yard pass from Javion Posey (Vladimir Rivas kick) (8 plays, 70 yards, 2:54)	FAU 24–10
4	14:09	FIU	Chase Gabriel 21-yard field goal (15 plays, 79 yards, 6:26)	FAU 24–13
4	12:41	FAU	James Charles 32-yard rush (Vladimir Rivas kick) (4 plays, 68 yards, 1:28)	FAU 31–13
4	02:29	FAU	Javion Posey 2-yard rush (Vladimir Rivas kick) (12 plays, 78 yards, 6:02)	FAU 38–13
4	01:55	FIU	Rivaldo Fairweather 67-yard pass from Max Bortenschlager (Max Bortenschlager two-point pass conversion attempt failed) (3 plays, 67 yards, 0:34)	FAU 38–19

Statistics	Florida Atlantic	FIU
First downs	22	15
Total yards	461	348
Rushing yards	381	156
Passing yards	80	192
Turnovers	1	0
Time of possession	31:28	28:32

Team	Category	Player	Statistics
Florida Atlantic	Passing	Javion Posey	10/16, 80 yards, 2 TDs
Florida Atlantic	Rushing	Javion Posey	18 carries, 182 yards, 1 TD
Florida Atlantic	Receiving	TJ Chase	1 reception, 28 yards
FIU	Passing	Max Bortenschlager	11/21, 149 yards, 1 TD
FIU	Rushing	D'Vonte Price	26 carries, 178 yards, 1 TD
FIU	Receiving	Rivaldo Fairweather	7 receptions, 116 yards, 1 TD

=== At Western Kentucky ===
Florida International at Western Kentucky

Team	1	2	3	4	Total
Panthers	7	6	0	8	21
• Hilltoppers	0	10	14	14	38

- Date: November 21, 2020
- Location: Houchens Industries–L. T. Smith Stadium
  Bowling Green, KY
- Game start: 2:05 p.m. EST
- Elapsed time: 3 hours and 14 minutes
- Game attendance: 3,823
- Game weather: 66 °F (19 °C) • Weather: Mostly Cloudy • Wind: S 5 MPH
- Referee: Joe Lehring
- TV announcers (ESPN3): Nate Gatter (play–by–play) and Brandon Doughty (analyst)

Scoring summary
1	08:40	FIU	JJ Holloman 28-yard pass from Max Bortenschlager (Chase Gabriel kick) (9 plays, 52 yards, 3:36)	FIU 7–0
2	10:33	WKU	Brayden Narveson 39-yard field goal (9 plays, 55 yards, 3:41)	FIU 7–3
2	10:19	FIU	EJ Wilson Jr. 100-yard kickoff returned (Chase Gabriel PAT failed) (0 plays, 0 yards, 0:00)	FIU 13–3
2	00:43	WKU	Tyrrell Pigrome 1-yard rush (Brayden Narveson kick) (8 plays, 65 yards, 3:11)	FIU 13–10
3	09:25	WKU	Roger Cray 19-yard fumble returned (Brayden Narveson kick) (6 plays, 18 yards, 2:34)	WKU 17–13
3	09:08	WKU	Eli Brown 22-yard interception returned (Brayden Narveson kick) (1 play, 0 yards, 0:08)	WKU 24–13
4	13:54	WKU	Gaej Walker 1-yard rush (Brayden Narveson kick) (3 plays, 59 yards, 0:56)	WKU 31–13
4	09:23	WKU	Tyrrell Pigrome 4-yard rush (Brayden Narveson kick) (4 plays, 44 yards, 1:27)	WKU 38–13
4	00:18	FIU	Kaylan Wiggins 1-yard rush (Kaylan Wiggins two-point conversion rush) (21 plays, 75 yards, 9:05)	WKU 38–21

Statistics	FIU	Western Kentucky
First downs	17	13
Total yards	268	278
Rushing yards	121	157
Passing yards	147	121
Turnovers	2	0
Time of possession	33:51	26:09

Team	Category	Player	Statistics
FIU	Passing	Max Bortenschlager	8/18, 106 yards, 1 TD, 1 INT
FIU	Rushing	D'Vonte Price	24 carries, 100 yards
FIU	Receiving	JJ Holloman	2 receptions, 54 yards, 1 TD
Western Kentucky	Passing	Tyrrell Pigrome	14/25, 121 yards
Western Kentucky	Rushing	Gaej Walker	17 carries, 127 yards, 1 TD
Western Kentucky	Receiving	Mitchell Tinsley	3 receptions, 28 yards
