= Bill Clark (American football) =

American football coach (born 1968)

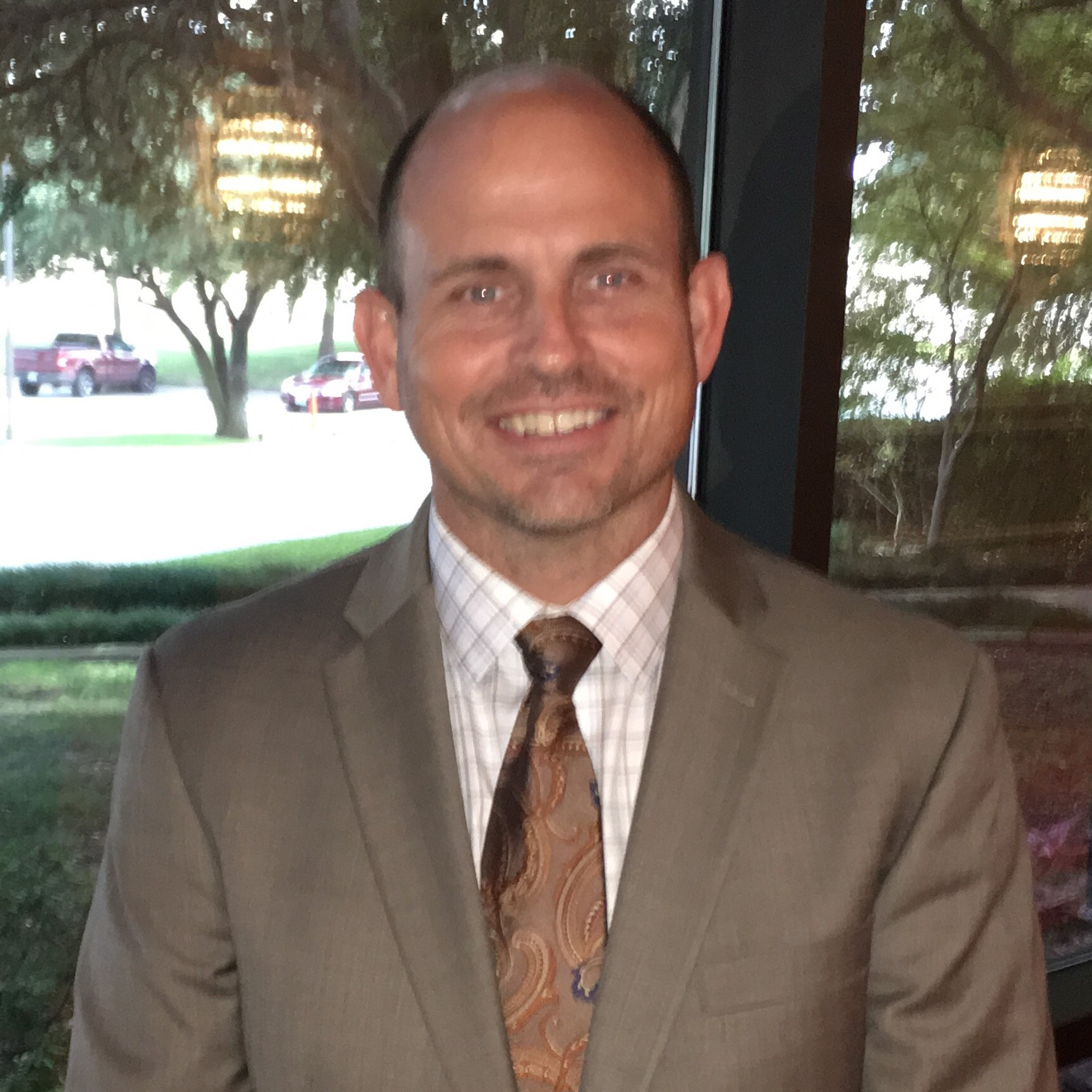
- Clark at 2017 C-USA media days

Biographical details
- Born: June 28, 1968 (age 58); Anniston, Alabama, U.S.
- Education: Jacksonville State University

Coaching career (HC unless noted)
- 1990–1991: Piedmont HS (AL) (assistant)
- 1992–1994: Tuscaloosa County HS (AL) (DC)
- 1995–1996: Coffee County HS (GA) (DC)
- 1997–1998: Dothan HS (AL) (DC)
- 1999–2007: Prattville HS (AL)
- 2008–2012: South Alabama (DC)
- 2013: Jacksonville State
- 2014–2021: UAB

Head coaching record
- Overall: 60–30 (college); 106–11 (high school)
- Bowls: 2–2
- Tournaments: 2–1 (NCAA D-I playoffs)

Accomplishments and honors

Championships
- 3 C-USA West (2018–2020); 2 C-USA (2018, 2020)

Awards
- C-USA Coach of the Year (2017); Eddie Robinson Coach of the Year Award (2018); Sporting News College Football Coach of the Year (2018)

Bill Bradford Clark (born June 28, 1968) is a retired American football coach. He was the head football coach at the University of Alabama at Birmingham (UAB). He held the position from the 2014 season until June 24, 2022, when he retired because of health issues related to his back.

== Career ==
Clark was born in Anniston, Alabama and grew up in Piedmont, Alabama, where he graduated from Piedmont High School. A pivotal moment in his life occurred during a summer workout between his freshman and sophomore years. He suffered a back injury while attempting to squat an excessive amount of weight. The injury worsened as he continued to play through it. After the pain reached an intolerable level, he consulted local orthopedic surgeon James Andrews, who would later become famous for treating athletes such as Michael Jordan and Brett Favre. Andrews told Clark that his spine was too seriously injured for him to play football, and that surgery (which was less advanced in the mid-1980s than today) was risky.

Clark started his coaching career as an offensive line coach at his alma mater of Piedmont High immediately out of college. From there, he moved to assistant posts at several other high schools until getting his first head coaching job at Prattville High School in Prattville, Alabama. During his tenure at Prattville, Clark compiled an overall record of 106 wins to only 11 losses (106–11) and won back-to-back Alabama High School Athletic Association (AHSAA) state championships in 2006 and 2007. In 2008, Clark was hired to serve as the first defensive coordinator at South Alabama. He stayed in that role through the 2012 season when he was hired as head coach at Jacksonville State. During his only season as head coach at Jacksonville State, Clark led the Gamecocks to their first playoff victories, 49 school records, 13 OVC records and three NCAA records. In January 2014, Clark was hired to serve as the fifth head coach at UAB following the resignation of Garrick McGee.

On December 2, 2014, UAB president Ray L. Watts announced that, after commissioning an in-depth inspection of UAB's athletic budget and revenue and how the elimination of football from the athletic program would affect those, UAB had decided to close down the football program in order to save money. On June 1, 2015, news reported that the UAB Blazers football program would be reinstated. That September, Clark and UAB agreed to a five-year contract extension.

However, Clark was left with a bare-bones staff with virtually no players, since the team would not resume play until 2017. According to a 2022 story by ESPN journalist Alex Scarborough,

Clark recruited junior college castoffs since high school players wouldn't give them the time of day. And somehow, someway, it worked. A team that had been snuffed out, a team that had absolutely no business competing at the FBS level, went 8–5 and appeared in the Bahamas Bowl during their first season in 2017.

The Blazers would go on to win the Conference USA (C-USA) West Division in each of the next three seasons, including wins in the 2018 and 2020 C-USA championship games. Clark's final game as Blazers head coach was a win over nationally ranked BYU in the 2021 Independence Bowl, the end of a season that also saw the Blazers open the new Protective Stadium and announce a 2023 move to the American Athletic Conference.

After seven years coaching at UAB, Clark resigned on June 24, 2022, citing back problems. He underwent successful spinal fusion surgery shortly after his retirement.

== Head coaching record ==
=== College ===
Year	Team	Overall	Conference	Standing	Bowl/playoffs	AP/TSN^{#}	Coaches^{°}
Jacksonville State Gamecocks (Ohio Valley Conference) (2013)
2013	Jacksonville State	11–4	5–3	T–3rd	L NCAA Division I Quarterfinal	10	12
Jacksonville State:		11–4	5–3				
UAB Blazers (Conference USA) (2014–2021)
2014	UAB	6–6	4–4	T–3rd (East)			
2017	UAB	8–5	6–2	2nd (West)	L Bahamas		
2018	UAB	11–3	7–1	1st (West)	W Boca Raton		
2019	UAB	9–5	6–2	T–1st (West)	L New Orleans		
2020	UAB	6–3	3–1	1st (West)	Gasparilla (Note: The Gasparilla Bowl was canceled due to COVID-19 issues and ruled a no contest.)		
2021	UAB	9–4	6–2	2nd (West)	W Independence		
UAB:		49–26	32–12				
Total:		60–30					
National championship Conference title Conference division title or championship game berth
