= 2020 UTEP Miners football team =

American college football season

2020 UTEP Miners football
- Conference: Conference USA
- West Division
- Record: 3–5 (0–4 C-USA)
- Head coach: Dana Dimel (3rd season)
- Offensive coordinator: Mike Canales (3rd season)
- Offensive scheme: Pro-style
- Defensive coordinator: Mike Cox (3rd season)
- Base defense: 4–3
- Home stadium: Sun Bowl Stadium

2020 Conference USA football standings
| | Conf. | | | Overall |
| Team | W | | L | W | | L |
|---|---|---|---|---|---|---|
East Division
| Marshall xy | 4 | – | 1 | 7 | – | 3 |
| Florida Atlantic | 4 | – | 2 | 5 | – | 4 |
| Western Kentucky | 4 | – | 3 | 5 | – | 7 |
| Charlotte | 2 | – | 2 | 2 | – | 4 |
| Middle Tennessee | 2 | – | 4 | 3 | – | 6 |
| FIU | 0 | – | 3 | 0 | – | 5 |
West Division
| UAB xy$ | 3 | – | 1 | 6 | – | 3 |
| UTSA | 5 | – | 2 | 7 | – | 5 |
| Louisiana Tech | 4 | – | 2 | 5 | – | 5 |
| North Texas | 3 | – | 4 | 4 | – | 6 |
| Rice | 2 | – | 3 | 2 | – | 3 |
| Southern Miss | 2 | – | 4 | 3 | – | 7 |
| UTEP | 0 | – | 4 | 3 | – | 5 |
Championship: UAB 22, Marshall 13
$ – Conference champion; x – Division champion/co-champions; y – Championship game participant; Note: Due to COVID-19, Old Dominion opted out of the season.

The 2020 UTEP Miners football team represented the University of Texas at El Paso (UTEP) as a member of the West Division in Conference USA (C-USA) during the 2020 NCAA Division I FCS football season. Led by third-year head coach Dana Dimel, the Miners compiled an overall record of 3–5 with a mark of 0–4 in conference play, placing seventh at the bottom of the standings in C-USA's West Division. The team played home games at the Sun Bowl in El Paso, Texas.

== Schedule ==
UTEP announced its 2020 football schedule on January 8, 2020. The Miners had games scheduled against FIU, Nevada, New Mexico State, Rice, Southern Miss, Texas Tech and UAB that were canceled due to the COVID-19 pandemic.

| Date | Time | Opponent | Site | TV | Result | Attendance |
|---|---|---|---|---|---|---|
| September 5 | 7:00 p.m. | Stephen F. Austin* | Sun Bowl; El Paso, TX | ESPN3 | W 24–14 | 6,047 |
| September 12 | 6:00 p.m. | at No. 14 Texas* | Darrell K Royal–Texas Memorial Stadium; Austin, TX | LHN | L 3–59 | 15,337 |
| September 19 | 7:00 p.m. | Abilene Christian* | Sun Bowl; El Paso, TX | ESPN3 | W 17–13 | 6,056 |
| September 26 | 1:30 p.m. | at Louisiana–Monroe* | Malone Stadium; Monroe, LA | ESPN2 | W 31–6 | 5,491 |
| October 10 | 5:30 p.m. | at Louisiana Tech | Joe Aillet Stadium; Ruston, LA | ESPN2 | L 17–21 | 7,140 |
| October 24 | 10:00 a.m. | at Charlotte | Jerry Richardson Stadium; Charlotte, NC | ESPN+ | L 28–38 | 1,042 |
| November 14 | 1:00 p.m. | at UTSA | Alamodome; San Antonio, TX | ESPN+ | L 21–52 | 6,243 |
| December 11 | 4:00 p.m. | at North Texas | Apogee Stadium; Denton, TX | ESPN3 | L 43–45 | 5,612 |
*Non-conference game; Rankings from AP Poll released prior to the game; All times are in Mountain time

== Preseason ==
=== C-USA media days ===
The C-USA Media Days were held virtually for the first time in conference history.

== Game summaries ==
=== Stephen F. Austin ===
Stephen F. Austin at Texas–El Paso

| Team | 1 | 2 | 3 | 4 | Total |
|---|---|---|---|---|---|
| Lumberjacks | 7 | 7 | 0 | 0 | 14 |
| • Miners | 3 | 14 | 0 | 7 | 24 |

- Date: September 5, 2020
- Location: Sun Bowl
  El Paso, TX
- Game start: 7:05 p.m. MDT
- Elapsed time: 3 hours and 42 minutes
- Game attendance: 6,047
- Game weather: Temperature: 88 °F (31 °C) • Weather: Sunny • Wind: E 15 MPH
- Referee: Rodney Burnette
- TV announcers (ESPN3): Erik Elken (play–by–play) and Trevor Vittatoe (analyst)

Scoring summary
| 1 | 12:01 | SFA | Lawton Rikel 17–yard pass from Trae Self (Chris Campos kick) (6 plays, 75 yards, 2:59) | SFA 7–0 |
| 1 | 03:25 | UTEP | Gavin Baechle 22–yard field goal (8 plays, 49 yards, 4:22) | SFA 7–3 |
| 2 | 12:03 | SFA | Da'leon Ward 1–yard run (Chris Campos kick) (12 plays, 84 yards, 6:17) | SFA 14–3 |
| 2 | 02:08 | UTEP | Justin Garrett 4–yard pass from Gavin Hardison (Gavin Baechle kick) (16 plays, 83 yards, 9:51) | SFA 14–10 |
| 2 | 00:20 | UTEP | Deion Hankins 10–yard run (Gavin Baechle kick) (2 plays, 9 yards, 0:52) | UTEP 17–14 |
| 4 | 03:51 | UTEP | Deion Hankins 4–yard run (Gavin Baechle kick) (9 plays, 80 yards, 4:18) | UTEP 24–14 |

| Statistics | Stephen F. Austin | UTEP |
|---|---|---|
| First downs | 14 | 19 |
| Total yards | 230 | 364 |
| Rushing yards | 97 | 152 |
| Passing yards | 133 | 212 |
| Turnovers | 2 | 2 |
| Time of possession | 23:13 | 36:47 |

| Team | Category | Player | Statistics |
|---|---|---|---|
| Stephen F. Austin | Passing | Trae Self | 14/21, 133 yards, 1 TD, 1 INT |
| Stephen F. Austin | Rushing | Da'Leon Ward | 14 carries, 51 yards, 1 TD |
| Stephen F. Austin | Receiving | Quentyvian Borders | 2 receptions, 41 yards |
| UTEP | Passing | Gavin Hardison | 17/28, 212 yards, 1 TD, 1 INT |
| UTEP | Rushing | Deion Hankins | 17 carries, 113 yards, 2 TDs |
| UTEP | Receiving | Jacob Cowing | 7 receptions, 116 yards |

=== At Texas ===
Texas–El Paso at Texas

| Team | 1 | 2 | 3 | 4 | Total |
|---|---|---|---|---|---|
| Miners | 0 | 3 | 0 | 0 | 3 |
| • No. 14 Longhorns | 21 | 24 | 7 | 7 | 59 |

- Date: September 12, 2020
- Location: Darrell K Royal–Texas Memorial Stadium
  Austin, TX
- Game start: 6:15 p.m. MDT
- Elapsed time: 3 hours and 38 minutes
- Game attendance: 15,337
- Game weather: Temperature: 88 °F (31 °C) • Weather: Partly Sunny • Wind: ENE 4 MPH
- Referee: Kevin Hassell
- TV announcers (LHN): Lowell Galindo (play–by–play), Andre Ware (analyst) and Kris Budden (sideline)

Scoring summary
| 1 | 14:41 | UT | Joshua Moore 78–yard pass from Sam Ehlinger (Cameron Dicker kick) (1 play, 78 yards, 0:19) | UT 7–0 |
| 1 | 09:32 | UT | Cade Brewer 20–yard pass from Sam Ehlinger (Cameron Dicker kick) (10 plays, 67 yards, 3:24) | UT 14–0 |
| 1 | 04:57 | UT | Roschon Johnson 1–yard run (Cameron Dicker kick) (8 plays, 70 yards, 3:03) | UT 21–0 |
| 2 | 14:10 | UT | Brenden Schooler 40–yard pass from Sam Ehlinger (Cameron Dicker kick) (4 plays, 76 yards, 0:50) | UT 28–0 |
| 2 | 12:15 | UT | Tarik Black 5–yard pass from Sam Ehlinger (Cameron Dicker kick) (3 plays, 42 yards, 1:02) | UT 35–0 |
| 2 | 06:16 | UT | Cameron Dicker 32–yard field goal (11 plays, 54 yards, 3:07) | UT 38–0 |
| 2 | 01:39 | UTEP | Gavin Baechle 47–yard field goal (11 plays, 46 yards, 4:37) | UT 38–3 |
| 2 | 00:06 | UT | Kai Money 6–yard pass from Sam Ehlinger (Cameron Dicker kick) (6 plays, 75 yards, 1:33) | UT 45–3 |
| 3 | 02:11 | UT | Brennan Eagles 35–yard pass from Casey Thompson (Cameron Dicker kick) (4 plays, 68 yards, 1:14) | UT 52–3 |
| 4 | 13:00 | UT | Marcus Washington 17–yard pass from Casey Thompson (Cameron Dicker kick) (8 plays, 54 yards, 2:28) | UT 59–3 |

| Statistics | UTEP | Texas |
|---|---|---|
| First downs | 14 | 28 |
| Total yards | 233 | 689 |
| Rushing yards | 43 | 208 |
| Passing yards | 190 | 481 |
| Turnovers | 0 | 1 |
| Time of possession | 34:17 | 25:43 |

| Team | Category | Player | Statistics |
|---|---|---|---|
| UTEP | Passing | Gavin Hardison | 12/27, 141 yards, 1 INT |
| UTEP | Rushing | Deion Hankins | 11 carries, 34 yards |
| UTEP | Receiving | Justin Garrett | 4 receptions, 58 yards |
| Texas | Passing | Sam Ehlinger | 25/33, 426 yards, 5 TDs |
| Texas | Rushing | Keaontay Ingram | 9 carries, 44 yards |
| Texas | Receiving | Joshua Moore | 6 receptions, 127 yards, 1 TD |

=== Abilene Christian ===
Abilene Christian at Texas–El Paso

| Team | 1 | 2 | 3 | 4 | Total |
|---|---|---|---|---|---|
| Wildcats | 7 | 0 | 3 | 3 | 13 |
| • Miners | 0 | 10 | 0 | 7 | 17 |

- Date: September 19, 2020
- Location: Sun Bowl
  El Paso, TX
- Game start: 7:05 p.m. MDT
- Elapsed time: 3 hours and 1 minute
- Game attendance: 6,056
- Game weather: Temperature: 81 °F (27 °C) • Weather: Sunny • Wind: NE 8 MPH
- Referee: Anthony Perez
- TV announcers (ESPN3): Erik Elken (play–by–play) and Trevor Vittatoe (analyst)

Scoring summary
| 1 | 09:03 | ACU | Jermiah Dobbins 2–yard run (Blair Zepeda kick) (6 plays, 56 yards, 3:06) | ACU 7–0 |
| 2 | 08:31 | UTEP | Gavin Baechle 27–yard field goal (10 plays, 58 yards, 4:21) | ACU 7–3 |
| 2 | 06:18 | UTEP | Joshua Fields 5–yard run (Gavin Baechle kick) (2 plays, 56 yards, 0:48) | UTEP 10–7 |
| 3 | 06:58 | ACU | Blair Zepeda 29–yard field goal (10 plays, 66 yards, 5:45) | TIE 10–10 |
| 4 | 14:12 | UTEP | Ronald Awatt 4–yard run (Gavin Baechle kick) (13 plays, 75 yards, 7:46) | UTEP 17–10 |
| 4 | 05:19 | ACU | Blair Zepeda 39–yard field goal (6 plays, 45 yards, 3:33) | UTEP 17–13 |

| Statistics | Abilene Christian | UTEP |
|---|---|---|
| First downs | 15 | 17 |
| Total yards | 308 | 293 |
| Rushing yards | 99 | 98 |
| Passing yards | 209 | 195 |
| Turnovers | 5 | 1 |
| Time of possession | 30:02 | 29:58 |

| Team | Category | Player | Statistics |
|---|---|---|---|
| Abilene Christian | Passing | Peyton Mansell | 14/21, 202 yards |
| Abilene Christian | Rushing | Tyrese White | 11 carries, 41 yards |
| Abilene Christian | Receiving | Taelyn Williams | 2 receptions, 77 yards |
| UTEP | Passing | Gavin Hardison | 15/25, 195 yards |
| UTEP | Rushing | Joshua Fields | 17 carries, 75 yards, 1 TD |
| UTEP | Receiving | Jacob Cowing | 8 receptions, 110 yards |

=== At Louisiana–Monroe ===
Texas–El Paso at Louisiana–Monroe

| Team | 1 | 2 | 3 | 4 | Total |
|---|---|---|---|---|---|
| • Miners | 7 | 17 | 0 | 7 | 31 |
| Warhawks | 0 | 0 | 6 | 0 | 6 |

- Date: September 26, 2020
- Location: Malone Stadium
  Monroe, LA
- Game start: 1:35 p.m. MDT
- Elapsed time: 3 hours and 12 minutes
- Game attendance: 5,491
- Game weather: Temperature: 79 °F (26 °C) • Weather: Partly Cloudy • Wind: WNW 6 MPH
- Referee: Jeremy Parker
- TV announcers (ESPN2): Clay Matvick (play–by–play) and Rocky Boiman (analyst)

Scoring summary
| 1 | 07:40 | UTEP | Deion Hawkins 2–yard run (Gavin Baechle kick) (3 plays, 86 yards, 1:35) | UTEP 7–0 |
| 2 | 13:33 | UTEP | Deion Hawkins 1–yard run (Gavin Baechle kick) (6 plays, 68 yards, 2:21) | UTEP 14–0 |
| 2 | 06:57 | UTEP | Deion Hawkins 8–yard run (Gavin Baechle kick) (9 plays, 73 yards, 4:15) | UTEP 21–0 |
| 2 | 00:21 | UTEP | Gavin Baechle 42–yard field goal (9 plays, 38 yards, 5:14) | UTEP 24–0 |
| 3 | 00:55 | ULM | Jahquan Bloomfield 35–yard pass from Colby Suits (Zach Elder kick failed) (4 plays, 55 yards, 1:41) | UTEP 24–6 |
| 4 | 02:32 | UTEP | Ronald Awatt 23–yard run (Gavin Baechle kick) (3 plays, 31 yards, 1:27) | UTEP 31–6 |

| Statistics | UTEP | Louisiana–Monroe |
|---|---|---|
| First downs | 21 | 6 |
| Total yards | 512 | 193 |
| Rushing yards | 210 | 7 |
| Passing yards | 302 | 186 |
| Turnovers | 3 | 1 |
| Time of possession | 39:36 | 20:24 |

| Team | Category | Player | Statistics |
|---|---|---|---|
| UTEP | Passing | Gavin Hardison | 13/25, 302 yards |
| UTEP | Rushing | Deion Hankins | 22 carries, 118 yards, 3 TDs |
| UTEP | Receiving | Justin Garrett | 7 receptions, 120 yards |
| Louisiana–Monroe | Passing | Colby Suits | 17/27, 184 yards, 1 TD, 1 INT |
| Louisiana–Monroe | Rushing | Josh Johnson | 9 carries, 19 yards |
| Louisiana–Monroe | Receiving | Jevin Frett | 2 receptions, 63 yards |

=== At Louisiana Tech ===
Texas–El Paso at Louisiana Tech

| Team | 1 | 2 | 3 | 4 | Total |
|---|---|---|---|---|---|
| Miners | 0 | 7 | 3 | 7 | 17 |
| • Bulldogs | 7 | 7 | 0 | 7 | 21 |

- Date: October 10, 2020
- Location: Joe Aillet Stadium
  Ruston, LA
- Game start: 5:35 p.m. MDT
- Elapsed time: 3 hours and 48 minutes
- Game attendance: 7,140
- Game weather: Temperature: 75 °F (24 °C) • Weather: Partly Cloudy • Wind: N 5 MPH
- Referee: Joe Lehring
- TV announcers (ESPN2): Dave O'Brien (play–by–play), Mike Golic (analyst) and Ian Fitzsimmons (sideline)

Scoring summary
| 1 | 11:23 | LATECH | Israel Tucker 15–yard run (Jacob Barnes kick) (10 plays, 75 yards, 3:37) | LATECH 7–0 |
| 2 | 09:56 | UTEP | Devaughn Cooper 33–yard pass from Gavin Hardison (Gavin Baechle kick) (5 plays, 48 yards, 1:57) | TIE 7–7 |
| 2 | 01:36 | LATECH | Justin Henderson 14–yard run (Jacob Barnes kick) (9 plays, 72 yards, 3:32) | LATECH 14–7 |
| 3 | 09:02 | UTEP | Gavin Baechle 29–yard field goal (8 plays, 33 yards, 3:31) | LATECH 14–10 |
| 4 | 11:47 | LATECH | Israel Tucker 1–yard run (Jacob Barnes kick) (13 plays, 60 yards, 5:33) | LATECH 21–10 |
| 4 | 11:32 | UTEP | Duron Lowe 100–yard kickoff return (Gavin Baechle kick) | LATECH 21–17 |

| Statistics | UTEP | Louisiana Tech |
|---|---|---|
| First downs | 14 | 16 |
| Total yards | 266 | 210 |
| Rushing yards | 60 | 91 |
| Passing yards | 206 | 119 |
| Turnovers | 2 | 0 |
| Time of possession | 26:58 | 33:02 |

| Team | Category | Player | Statistics |
|---|---|---|---|
| UTEP | Passing | Gavin Hardison | 18/38, 206 yards, 1 TD, 1 INT |
| UTEP | Rushing | Deion Hankins | 15 carries, 35 yards |
| UTEP | Receiving | Jacob Cowing | 7 receptions, 63 yards |
| Louisiana Tech | Passing | Luke Anthony | 11/20, 85 yards |
| Louisiana Tech | Rushing | Justin Henderson | 15 carries, 54 yards, 1 TD |
| Louisiana Tech | Receiving | Adrian Hardy | 4 receptions, 58 yards |

=== At Charlotte ===
Texas–El Paso at Charlotte

| Team | 1 | 2 | 3 | 4 | Total |
|---|---|---|---|---|---|
| Miners | 7 | 7 | 0 | 14 | 28 |
| • 49ers | 7 | 7 | 7 | 17 | 38 |

- Date: October 24, 2020
- Location: Jerry Richardson Stadium
  Charlotte, NC
- Game start: 10:05 a.m. MDT
- Elapsed time: 3 hours and 16 minutes
- Game attendance: 1,042
- Game weather: Temperature: 65 °F (18 °C) • Weather: Sunny • Wind: 0 MPH
- Referee: Jonathan Noli
- TV announcers (ESPN+): Dave Friedman (play–by–play) and Reggie Walker (analyst)

Scoring summary
| 1 | 12:20 | CHAR | Aaron McAllister 7–yard run (Jonathan Cruz kick) (2 plays, 7 yards, 0:09) | CHAR 7–0 |
| 1 | 03:29 | UTEP | Deion Hankins 2–yard run (Gavin Baechle kick) (15 plays, 64 yards, 8:51) | TIE 7–7 |
| 2 | 05:35 | UTEP | Ronald Awatt 4–yard run (Gavin Baechle kick) (13 plays, 98 yards, 6:35) | UTEP 14–7 |
| 2 | 00:26 | CHAR | Victor Tucker 22–yard pass from Chris Reynolds (Jonathan Cruz kick) (10 plays, 79 yards, 5:09) | TIE 14–14 |
| 3 | 03:31 | CHAR | Cameron Dollar 10–yard pass from Chris Reynolds (Jonathan Cruz kick) (8 plays, 37 yards, 3:22) | CHAR 21–14 |
| 4 | 12:42 | CHAR | Jonathan Cruz 32–yard field goal (9 plays, 45 yards, 4:15) | CHAR 24–14 |
| 4 | 04:40 | CHAR | Micaleous Elder 13–yard run (Jonathan Cruz kick) (7 plays, 49 yards, 3:35) | CHAR 31–14 |
| 4 | 02:43 | UTEP | Justin Garrett 8–yard pass from Gavin Hardison (Gavin Baechle kick) (7 plays, 59 yards, 1:57) | CLT 31–21 |
| 4 | 02:30 | CHAR | Aaron McAllister 36–yard run (Jonathan Cruz kick) (1 play, 36 yards, 0:13) | CHAR 38–21 |
| 4 | 00:53 | UTEP | Justin Garrett 11–yard pass from Gavin Hardison (Gavin Baechle kick) (7 plays, 62 yards, 1:37) | CHAR 38–28 |

| Statistics | UTEP | Charlotte |
|---|---|---|
| First downs | 24 | 17 |
| Total yards | 374 | 329 |
| Rushing yards | 170 | 144 |
| Passing yards | 204 | 185 |
| Turnovers | 2 | 1 |
| Time of possession | 31:02 | 28:58 |

| Team | Category | Player | Statistics |
|---|---|---|---|
| UTEP | Passing | Gavin Hardison | 19/35, 204 yards, 2 TDs, 2 INTs |
| UTEP | Rushing | Deion Hankins | 18 carries, 119 yards, 1 TD |
| UTEP | Receiving | Justin Garrett | 9 receptions, 107 yards, 2 TDs |
| Charlotte | Passing | Chris Reynolds | 14/23, 185 yards, 2 TDs |
| Charlotte | Rushing | Aaron McAllister | 8 carries, 68 yards, 2 TDs |
| Charlotte | Receiving | Victor Tucker | 6 receptions, 86 yards, 1 TD |

=== At UTSA ===
Texas–El Paso at Texas–San Antonio

| Team | 1 | 2 | 3 | 4 | Total |
|---|---|---|---|---|---|
| Miners | 7 | 14 | 0 | 0 | 21 |
| • Roadrunners | 3 | 21 | 14 | 14 | 52 |

- Date: November 14, 2020
- Location: Alamodome
  San Antonio, TX
- Game start: 1:08 p.m. MST
- Elapsed time: 2 hours and 57 minutes
- Game attendance: 6,243
- Game weather: Temperature: 74 °F (23 °C) • Weather: Indoors • Wind: N/A
- Referee: Rodney Burnette
- TV announcers (ESPN+): Lincoln Rose (play–by–play) and LaDarrin McLane (analyst)

Scoring summary
| 1 | 11:49 | UTSA | Hunter Duplessis 49–yard field goal (10 plays, 43 yards, 3:11) | UTSA 3–0 |
| 1 | 02:22 | UTEP | Jacob Cowing 52–yard pass from Gavin Hardison (Gavin Baechle kick) (6 plays, 80 yards, 2:41) | UTEP 7–3 |
| 2 | 12:44 | UTSA | Brennon Dingle 3–yard pass from Frank Harris (Hunter Duplessis kick) (6 plays, 80 yards, 2:16) | UTSA 10–7 |
| 2 | 03:32 | UTEP | Calvin Brownholtz 1–yard run (Gavin Baechle kick) (10 plays, 74 yards, 4:55) | UTEP 14–10 |
| 2 | 01:35 | UTSA | Zakhari Franklin 35–yard pass from Frank Harris (Hunter Duplessis kick) (6 plays, 71 yards, 1:57) | UTSA 17–14 |
| 2 | 00:58 | UTEP | Deion Hankins 1–yard run (Gavin Baechle kick) (2 plays, 5 yards, 0:37) | UTEP 21–17 |
| 2 | 00:19 | UTSA | Frank Harris 35–yard run (Hunter Duplessis kick) (3 plays, 70 yards, 0:39) | UTSA 24–21 |
| 3 | 08:26 | UTSA | Tykee Ogle–Kellogg 15–yard pass from Frank Harris (Hunter Duplessis kick) (9 plays, 80 yards, 3:05) | UTSA 31–21 |
| 3 | 02:54 | UTSA | Frank Harris 4–yard run (Hunter Duplessis kick) (9 plays, 46 yards, 4:25) | UTSA 38–21 |
| 4 | 11:05 | UTSA | Kaedric Cobbs 1–yard run (Hunter Duplessis kick) (8 plays, 59 yards, 4:24) | UTSA 45–21 |
| 4 | 03:16 | UTSA | B.J. Daniels 5–yard run (Hunter Duplessis kick) (11 plays, 89 yards, 6:07) | UTSA 52–21 |

| Statistics | UTEP | UTSA |
|---|---|---|
| First downs | 13 | 29 |
| Total yards | 246 | 600 |
| Rushing yards | 77 | 288 |
| Passing yards | 169 | 312 |
| Turnovers | 7 | 4 |
| Time of possession | 27:08 | 32:52 |

| Team | Category | Player | Statistics |
|---|---|---|---|
| UTEP | Passing | Gavin Hardison | 14/21, 159 yards, 1 TD |
| UTEP | Rushing | Deion Hankins | 16 carries, 74 yards, 1 TD |
| UTEP | Receiving | Jacob Cowing | 2 receptions, 58 yards, 1 TD |
| UTSA | Passing | Frank Harris | 22/26, 312 yards, 3 TDs |
| UTSA | Rushing | Brenden Brady | 26 carries, 124 yards |
| UTSA | Receiving | Zakhari Franklin | 6 receptions, 118 yards, 1 TD |

=== At North Texas ===
Texas–El Paso at North Texas

| Team | 1 | 2 | 3 | 4 | Total |
|---|---|---|---|---|---|
| Miners | 7 | 14 | 0 | 22 | 43 |
| • Mean Green | 7 | 10 | 14 | 14 | 45 |

- Date: December 11, 2020
- Location: Apogee Stadium
  Denton, TX
- Game start: 4:05 p.m. MST
- Elapsed time: 3 hours and 33 minutes
- Game attendance: 5,612
- Game weather: Temperature: 60 °F (16 °C) • Weather: Partly Cloudy • Wind: NW 8 MPH
- Referee: Kevin Randall
- TV announcers (ESPN3): Jon Teicher (play–by–play) and Mike Perez (analyst)

Scoring summary
| 1 | 07:24 | UTEP | Calvin Brownholtz 29–yard run (Gavin Baechle kick) (6 plays, 33 yards, 4:01) | UTEP 7–0 |
| 1 | 02:38 | UNT | Deonte Simpson 46–yard pass from Austin Aune (Ethan Mooney kick) (1 play, 46 yards, 0:08) | TIE 7–7 |
| 2 | 14:23 | UTEP | Deion Hankins 2–yard run (Gavin Baechle kick) (8 plays, 69 yards, 3:15) | UTEP 14–7 |
| 2 | 14:11 | UNT | Jaelon Darden 75–yard pass from Austin Aune (Ethan Mooney kick) (1 play, 75 yards, 0:12) | TIE 14–14 |
| 2 | 04:43 | UNT | Ethan Mooney 24–yard field goal (8 plays, 44 yards, 2:52) | UNT 17–14 |
| 2 | 00:43 | UTEP | Deion Hankins 7–yard run (Gavin Baechle kick) (8 plays, 67 yards, 1:19) | UTEP 21–17 |
| 3 | 08:06 | UNT | Jaelon Darden 32–yard pass from Austin Aune (Ethan Mooney kick) (5 plays, 48 yards, 1:17) | UNT 24–21 |
| 3 | 02:04 | UNT | Austin Aune 4–yard run (Ethan Mooney kick) (12 plays, 81 yards, 3:58) | UNT 31–21 |
| 4 | 14:21 | UTEP | Jacob Cowing 28–yard pass from Calvin Brownholtz (Gavin Baechle kick) (7 plays, 69 yards, 2:43) | UNT 31–28 |
| 4 | 11:49 | UNT | Jaelon Darden 2–yard pass from Austin Aune (Ethan Mooney kick) (8 plays, 62 yards, 2:32) | UNT 38–28 |
| 4 | 08:40 | UNT | Jaelon Darden 50–yard pass from Austin Aune (Ethan Mooney kick) (5 plays, 65 yards, 1:18) | UNT 45–28 |
| 4 | 06:32 | UTEP | Jacob Cowing 17–yard pass from Calvin Brownholtz (Trent Thompson pass) (5 plays, 75 yards, 2:08) | UNT 45–36 |
| 4 | 00:26 | UTEP | Calvin Brownholtz 5–yard run (Gavin Baechle kick) (6 plays, 69 yards, 1:00) | UNT 45–43 |

| Statistics | UTEP | North Texas |
|---|---|---|
| First downs | 27 | 24 |
| Total yards | 497 | 491 |
| Rushing yards | 301 | 189 |
| Passing yards | 196 | 302 |
| Turnovers | 1 | 2 |
| Time of possession | 35:45 | 24:15 |

| Team | Category | Player | Statistics |
|---|---|---|---|
| UTEP | Passing | Calvin Brownholtz | 10/26, 196 yards, 2 TDs, 4 INTs |
| UTEP | Rushing | Calvin Brownholtz | 15 carries, 114 yards, 2 TDs |
| UTEP | Receiving | Jacob Cowing | 5 receptions, 118 yards, 2 TDs |
| North Texas | Passing | Austin Aune | 16/29, 302 yards, 5 TDs |
| North Texas | Rushing | Tre Siggers | 15 carries, 94 yards |
| North Texas | Receiving | Jaelon Darden | 8 receptions, 173 yards, 4 TDs |
