= UAB Blazers football =

Football team in Alabama

2026 UAB Blazers football team
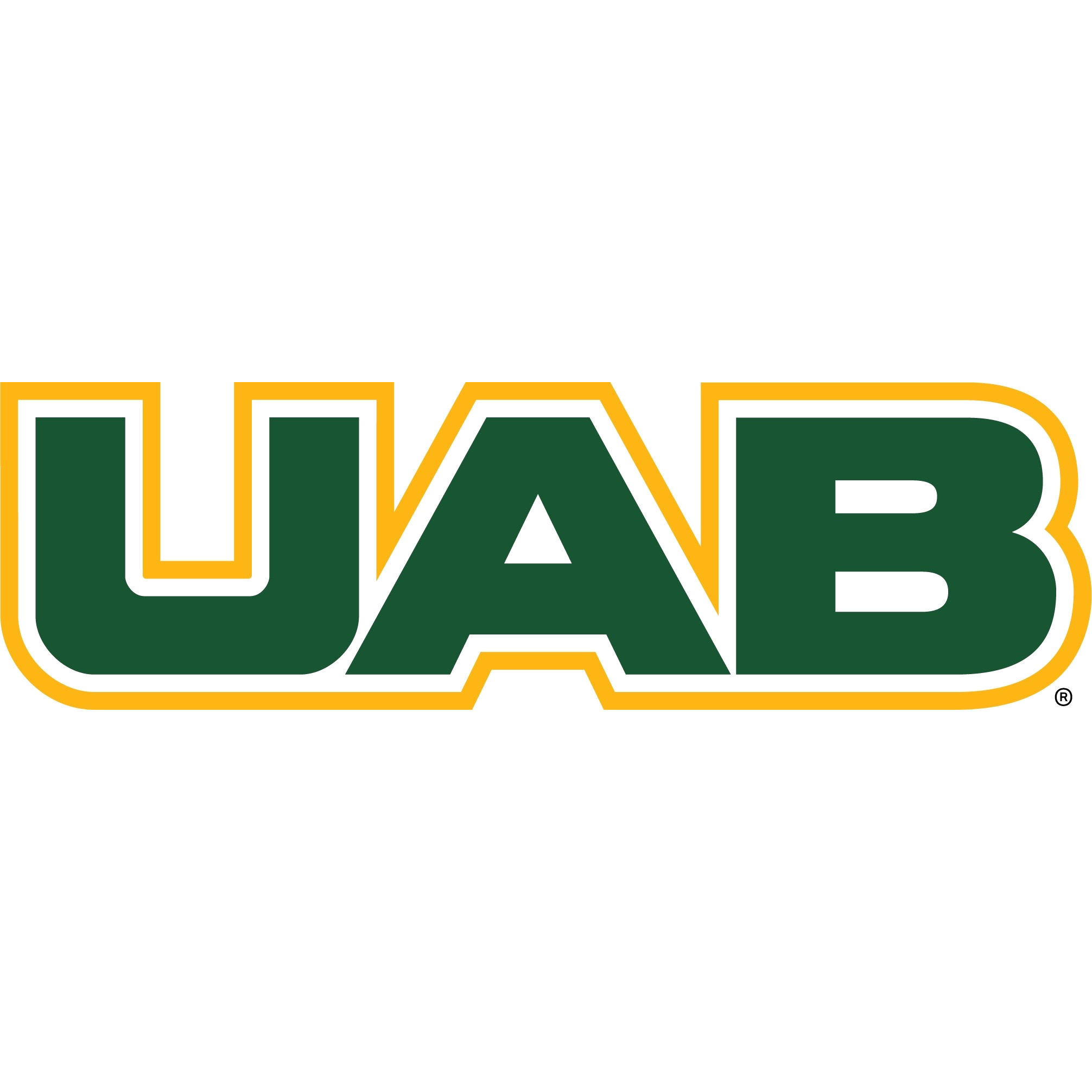
- First season: 1991; 35 years ago
- Head coach: Alex Mortensen; 2nd season, 6–7 (.462)
- Location: Birmingham, Alabama
- Stadium: Protective Stadium (capacity: 47,100)
- NCAA division: Division I FBS
- Conference: The American
- Colors: UAB Green and UAB Gold
- All-time record: 179–205–2 (.466)
- Bowl record: 3–3 (.500)

Conference championships
- C-USA: 2018, 2020

Division championships
- C-USA West: 2018, 2019, 2020
- Rivalries: Memphis (rivalry); Southern Miss; Troy

Uniforms
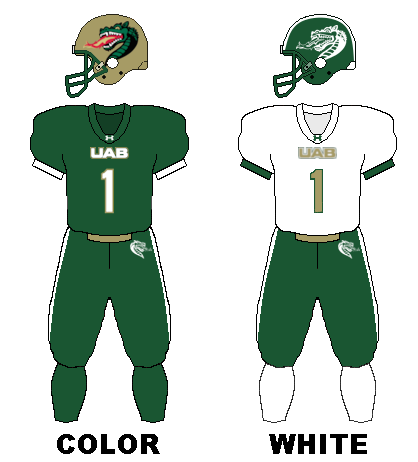
- Fight song: UAB Fight Song
- Mascot: Blaze (Dragon)
- Marching band: UAB Marching Blazers
- Website: https://uabsports.com/sports/football

The UAB Blazers football team represents the University of Alabama at Birmingham (UAB) in college football. The Blazers compete in the Football Bowl Subdivision (FBS) of the National Collegiate Athletic Association (NCAA) as a member of the American Conference. The team is led by head coach Alex Mortensen and plays its home games at Protective Stadium at the Birmingham–Jefferson Convention Complex in Birmingham, Alabama.

UAB began play in 1991. UAB was a founding member of Conference USA in 1995 as a non-football member, and began conference football play in 1999. The program was discontinued after the 2014 season, then reinstated in 2015 and returned to competition in 2017. UAB won its first conference championship and bowl game in 2018. UAB joined the American Conference in 2023.

== History ==
=== Jim Hilyer era (1991–1994) ===
UAB football began with the play of an organized club football team in 1989. After two years competing as a club football team, on March 13, 1991, UAB President Charles McCallum and athletic director Gene Bartow announced that the university would compete in football as an NCAA Division III team beginning in the fall of 1991, with Jim Hilyer serving as the first head coach.

From 1991 to 1992, UAB competed as a Division III Independent, and during this period, the Blazers compiled an 11–6–2 overall record. During this period, the Blazers played their first all-time game on September 7, 1991, a 28–0 loss at Millsaps, and notched their first all-time win on September 21, 1991, a 34–21 victory at Washington & Lee. After only a pair of seasons at the Division III level, an NCAA ruling resulted in the Blazers being reclassified as a I-AA team for the 1993 season. The reclassification was a result of the NCAA prohibiting a school's athletic program from being multi-divisional, and since UAB already competed in Division I in other sports, the move became necessary. In their first game as a I-AA team, the Blazers would lose to Troy State 37–3 before a home crowd on September 6, 1993. By 1994, the Blazers would play their first I-A opponent against Kansas. Following the 1994 season, coach Hilyer would resign with Watson Brown being announced as the program's second ever coach on January 2, 1995.

During the 1995 season, the Blazers would notch their first ever victory over a I-A opponent on the road against North Texas by a score of 19–14. From 1993 to 1995, UAB competed as a Division I-AA Independent, and during this period compiled a 21–12 overall record before making the jump to Division I-A for the 1996 season.

=== Watson Brown era (1995–2006) ===
Watson Brown came to UAB from Oklahoma, where he served as offensive coordinator. On November 9, 1995, UAB was officially informed by the NCAA that the school had met all requirements for reclassification, and as such the Blazers would enter the 1996 season as an I-A Independent. In their first I-A game, UAB was defeated by in-state rival Auburn 29–0, and would finish their first I-A season with a 5–6 overall record. Already a participating member in other sports, on November 13, 1996, Conference USA commissioner Michael Slive announced that UAB would be admitted to the league as a football playing member for the 1999 season.

Following the transition to I-A, UAB often played a couple of out-of-conference games with college football's traditional powers every year. In 2000, UAB defeated the SEC's LSU Tigers in Baton Rouge. In 2004, UAB reached yet another milestone earning its first bowl trip in school history, to the Hawaii Bowl.

After being the face of the program for 12 years, on December 9, 2006, Watson Brown resigned as UAB's head coach to take the head coaching position at Tennessee Tech.

=== Neil Callaway era (2007–2011) ===
Following Brown's resignation, UAB first intended to promote assistant Pat Sullivan, but the University of Alabama system board of trustees blocked the promotion. UAB then had a deal in place with Jimbo Fisher, then offensive coordinator at LSU, who would eventually go on to be the head coach at Florida State. The trustees again denied UAB its desired hire. Following the scuttling of the deal with Fisher, some sportswriters, including CBSSports.com reporter Gregg Doyel, noted that Alabama was also looking for a new head coach at the time, adding that Fisher had served as offensive coordinator when Alabama's top candidate Nick Saban had been head coach at LSU. Doyel postulated that because of this familiarity, Alabama may have looked to hire Fisher and thus the trustees did not want UAB interfering with the potential hire and consequently impeded their coaching search.

After exhausting many options, UAB finally turned to former Alabama player and Georgia offensive coordinator Neil Callaway, who was named head coach on December 17, 2006. The hire was strongly questioned by some, as Callaway did not exactly have a history of success. In his first season, Callaway led the Blazers to the school's worst record (2–10), dropping the program's all-time record under .500 for the first time in school history.

On November 27, 2011, Callaway was fired as UAB's head coach having compiled a record of 18 wins and 42 losses (18–42) during his five years with the Blazers.

=== Garrick McGee era (2012–2013) ===
UAB hired Arkansas offensive coordinator Garrick McGee as its fourth head coach December 2011. The Blazers went 3–9 in 2012 and 2-10 in 2013 under McGee, continuing the program's struggles in Conference USA. He resigned after two seasons in January 2014 to become offensive coordinator at Louisville under Bobby Petrino.

=== Bill Clark era (2014–2022) ===
In January 2014, UAB hired former Jacksonville State head coach Bill Clark to lead a program that had gone 5-19 over the previous two seasons. Clark’s impact was immediate, with the Blazers posting a 6-6 record in his first season and becoming bowl eligible for the first time since 2004.

==== Program shutdown and reinstatement ====
The day after clinching bowl eligibility, Sports Illustrated reported that UAB was planning to fire athletic director Brian Mackin and end the football program. On December 2, UAB president Ray Watts officially announced the closure of the football, rifle, and bowling programs, citing projected costs of $49 million over five years to remain competitive, over the $20 million a year already spent on the program, and that after five years this cost would likely continue to rise. The decision was met with great outrage and criticism of Watts, as well as the University of Alabama Board of Trustees. The backlash was from students, faculty, Birmingham civic leaders, and the broader college football community. The UAB Faculty Senate passed a vote of no confidence in Watts, and an independent task force was formed to evaluate the findings of the report on which the decision was based.

Clark remained with the university throughout the shutdown, continuing to recruit despite having no active program. Community fundraising efforts raised more than $27 million and on June 1, 2015, Watts announced that due to the unprecedented public support the program would be reinstated to begin play as early as the 2016 season. Athletic Director Mark Ingram indicated that 2017 was a more reasonable timeline to field a football team, due to the number of players who transferred away from the program following the termination and the NCAA's recruiting rules. The NCAA cleared UAB to resume competition in 2017 and retain its FBS status, and Conference USA confirmed UAB would remain a member.On January 16, 2016, the UAB football team announced its slate of non-conference opponents for when it returned to play in the 2017 season.

==== Return and championship era ====
On August 29, 2016, UAB broke ground on a $22.5-million football operations center including a $4.2-million covered pavilion practice field with an anticipated completion date of summer 2017. The center was opened to the public on August 18, 2017.

In its first year back from the two-year hiatus, UAB went 8-5 in 2017 and became bowl eligible after defeating Rice 52–21 at Legion Field. The program's defining moment came on December 1, 2018, when UAB defeated Middle Tennessee to win its first Conference USA championship, and the first conference championship in program history. Two weeks later, the Blazers beat Northern Illinois 37–13 in the Cheribundi Boca Raton Bowl for the program's first bowl victory.

In 2020, UAB won its second Conference USA championship in three seasons, defeating Marshall 22–13 in the conference title game. UAB continued its success in 2021, highlighted by a 31–28 win over No. 13 BYU in the Independence Bowl.

Clark resigned on June 24, 2022, after seven seasons, citing chronic back problems. He left as the winningest coach in program history. Offensive coordinator Bryant Vincent was named interim head coach for the 2022 season. Vincent would lead the Blazers to a 7-6 season, including a 24–20 win over Miami (OH) in the Bahamas Bowl.

=== Trent Dilfer era (2023–2025) ===
On November 30, 2022, UAB named former NFL quarterback Trent Dilfer as the program's seventh head coach. Dilfer, who played for 13 years in the NFL and won Super Bowl XXXV with the Baltimore Ravens, had no previous college coaching experience. The Blazers struggled under Dilfer, compiling a 9-21 record across two and a half seasons. Dilfer was fired on October 12, 2025.

=== Alex Mortensen era (2025–present) ===
Offensive coordinator Alex Mortensen was named interim head coach on October 12, 2025, having served on staff for two and a half years. In his first game, UAB upset No. 22 Memphis 31–24. On November 23, 2025, an offensive lineman was arrested after a stabbing incident at a team facility before South Florida game; UAB lost that game 48–18. The team closed the regular season with a 31–24 road win over Tulsa; its first road victory since December 2022, despite missing 39 players. Mortensen was named the program’s permanent head coach on December 5, 2025. Ahead of the 2026 season, Mortensen hired former SEC defensive coordinator Todd Grantham.

== Conference affiliations ==
- Independent - Division III (1991–1992)
- Independent - Division I-AA (1993–1995)
- Independent - Division I-A (1996–1998)
- Conference USA (1999–2014, 2017–2022)
- American Conference (2023–present)

== Championships ==
=== Conference championships ===
The Blazers have won two conference championships.

Season	Conference	Coach	Overall Record	Conference Record
2018	Conference USA	Bill Clark	11–3	7–1
2020	Conference USA	Bill Clark	6–3	3–1

=== Division championships ===
The Blazers have been members of Conference USA since 1999. The conference split into two divisions in 2005, with UAB competing in the East Division until 2014. In 2017, UAB was moved into the West Division, where the Blazers won three division titles. C-USA eliminated its divisions after losing three of its previous 14 members after the 2021 season.

Season	Division	Coach	Opponent	CG results
2018	C-USA West	Bill Clark	Middle Tennessee	W 27–25
2019†	C-USA West	Bill Clark	Florida Atlantic	L 6–49
2020	C-USA West	Bill Clark	Marshall	W 22–13

† Co-champions

== Bowl games ==
The Blazers have played in six bowl games, compiling a record of 3–3.

Season	Coach	Bowl	Opponent	Result
2004	Watson Brown	Hawaii Bowl	Hawaii	L 40–59
2017	Bill Clark	Bahamas Bowl	Ohio	L 6–41
2018	Bill Clark	Boca Raton Bowl	Northern Illinois	W 37–13
2019	Bill Clark	New Orleans Bowl	Appalachian State	L 17–31
2020	Bill Clark	Gasparilla Bowl	South Carolina	Canceled
2021	Bill Clark	Independence Bowl	BYU	W 31–28
2022	Bryant Vincent	Bahamas Bowl	Miami (OH)	W 24–20

== Rivalries ==
=== Southern Miss ===
UAB and Southern Miss have met 18 times. The first meeting came in 2000, when Southern Miss won 33–30. The teams met every season thereafter except in 2015 and 2016, when UAB did not field a football team. Southern Miss won the first nine meetings, but UAB has won seven of the last nine, narrowing the series to 11–7 in favor of the Golden Eagles. The rivalry has been on hold since 2022, when Southern Miss left Conference USA for the Sun Belt Conference.

=== Troy ===
Troy and UAB have met a total of 12 times. Both teams met fairly consistently until 2014. The teams are scheduled to renew their rivalry in 2028. Troy holds the series lead, 7–5.

=== Memphis ===
UAB and Memphis contest the Battle of the Bones, a rivalry game in which the winner receives a 100-lb bronze trophy shaped like a rack of ribs, a reference to the barbecue traditions of Birmingham and Memphis. The rivalry was suspended after the 2012 season when Memphis left Conference USA for the American. Memphis won the final meeting before the hiatus and retained the trophy until the series resumed in 2023, after UAB joined the American. UAB defeated No. 22 Memphis at Protective Stadium in 2025 and leads the series 11–5.

== Facilities ==
=== Protective Stadium ===
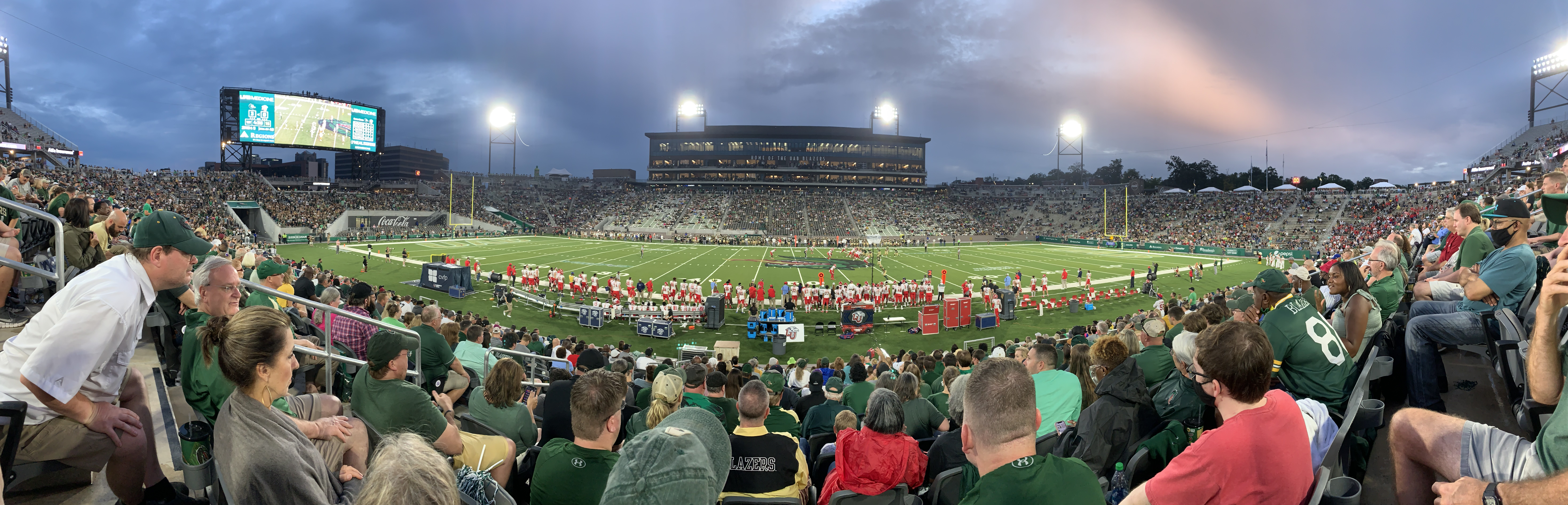
Protective Stadium's debut: UAB vs. Liberty on October 2, 2021

UAB opened Protective Stadium, a $200 million, 47,100-seat stadium, on October 2, 2021, as the Blazers hosted the Liberty Flames. Protective Stadium includes a permanent UAB football locker room with 76 lockers, a head coach’s office with private restroom for exclusive UAB use, a 17-locker staff locker room, and a UAB-branded 6,442-square-foot meeting and banquet space used for pregame recruiting activities.

=== Football Operations Center and Legacy Pavilion ===
As part of the reinstatement of football, UAB raised more than $22.5 million to build a 46,000-square-foot football operations center, an outdoor turf practice field, and the 80,000-square-foot Legacy Pavilion, an open air covered practice facility.

== Traditions ==
=== First-Year Student Football Run Out Squad ===
For the season opener, members of the First-Year Student Football Run Out Squad lead the team onto the field. In 2025, nearly 800 students participated.

=== Blazer Village ===
Blazer Village is a pregame fan zone in Uptown Birmingham held before home games at Protective Stadium. The area serves as a central gathering point for fans and typically features food, entertainment, and pregame activities as part of the Blazers’ game-day atmosphere.

=== Blazer Walk ===
Two hours prior to game time the team, marching band, cheerleaders walk through Uptown to Protective Stadium. The event gives fans an opportunity to welcome the team as it arrives and has become a visible part of UAB’s home game-day tradition.

=== Children's Harbor Game ===
Since 2017, UAB has partnered with Children’s Harbor, a non-profit supporting critically ill children and their families, for an annual home game. During the event, players wear the name of Children’s Harbor patients on their jersey in place of their own. The tradition reflects UAB’s identity as one of the nation’s leading academic medical centers and its close ties to Children’s of Alabama, located adjacent to the university’s campus. The game has become one of the program’s signature community events, drawing attention to pediatric healthcare in Birmingham.

== All-Americans ==
- Kelvin Hill, CB- 2024 (CFN Freshman All-American)
- Solomon Beebe, KR- 2024 (CFN Freshman Honorable Mention)

J.J. Nelson, KR- 2014 (AP 1st Team)

== Future non-conference opponents ==
Announced schedules as of November 13, 2025.

2026	2027	2028	2029	2030	2031	2032	2033
at Illinois	vs Jacksonville State	at Jacksonville State	at Troy	at South Alabama	vs South Alabama	at Troy	vs Troy
vs Louisiana–Monroe	at Georgia State	vs Georgia State	at Georgia State	vs Georgia State			
at Louisiana	vs Samford	vs Troy					
vs Samford							

== See also ==
- American football in the United States
