= Kirk Campbell =

American football player and coach (born 1986

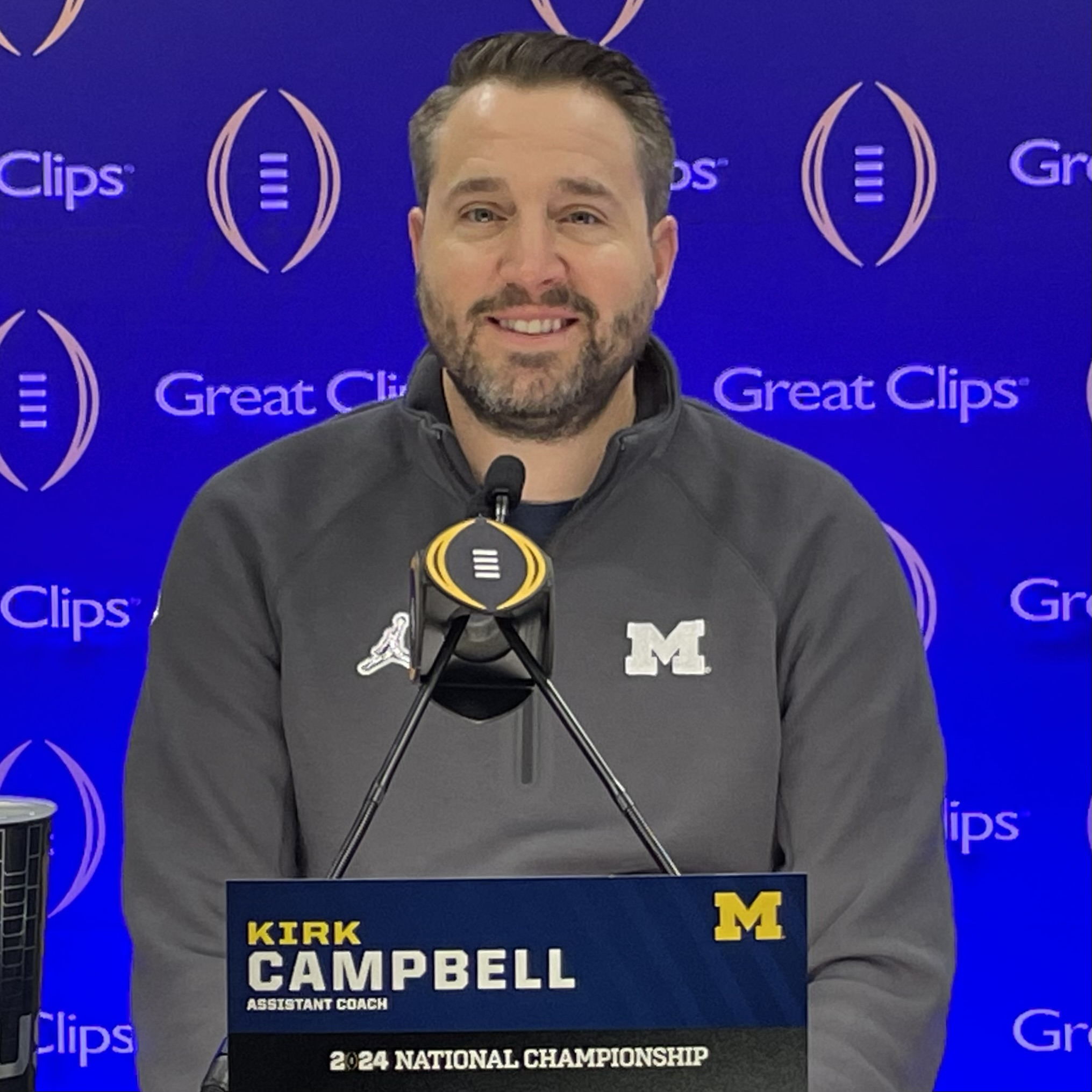
- Campbell in 2024

Los Angeles Chargers
- Title: Offensive assistant coach

Personal information
- Born: March 22, 1986 (age 40); Pittsburgh, Pennsylvania, U.S.

Career information
- Position: Wide receiver
- College: Mercyhurst (2004–2007)

Career history
- West Virginia Wesleyan (2009–2010) Graduate assistant; Tiffin (2011) Wide receivers coach & tight ends coach; Alderson Broaddus (2012–2016) Assistant head coach & offensive coordinator; Penn State 2017–2019 Offensive analyst; Old Dominion 2020–2021 Offensive coordinator & quarterbacks coach; Michigan (2022) Offensive analyst; Michigan (2023) Quarterbacks coach; Michigan (2024) Offensive coordinator & quarterbacks coach; Los Angeles Chargers (2025–present) Offensive assistant

Awards and highlights
- CFP national champion (2023)

Kirk Campbell (born March 22, 1986) is an American football coach. He is currently an offensive assistant coach for the Los Angeles Chargers of the National Football League (NFL). He was previously the offensive coordinator for the University of Michigan and Old Dominion University.

== Personal ==
Campbell was born in 1986 to Kevin and Cindy Campbell. The youngest of three boys. His older brothers are Kevin Campbell and Kellen Campbell. He grew up in Pittsburgh, Pennsylvania, and attended West Allegheny Senior High School. He attended Mercyhurst University, where he played football as a wide receiver. Campbell graduated in 2008 with a degree in communications. He also earned a masters degree in business administration and management from Tiffin University, graduating in 2012. On June 30, 2017, Campbell married Lauren (Schiefelbein) Campbell a graphic designer. He and his wife have three daughters, Riley, Kinsley and McKenna.

== Coaching career ==
=== Early years ===
Campbell began his coaching career as graduate assistant at West Virginia Wesleyan College, from 2009 to 2010. He then coached the wide receivers and tight ends at Tiffin University in 2011. From 2012 to 2016, he was the offensive coordinator and assistant head coach at Alderson Broaddus University, a division II program.

=== Penn State ===
In 2017, he joined Penn State as an offensive analyst, spending three seasons with the Nittany Lions.

=== Old Dominion ===
In January 2020, Campbell was hired to serve as the offensive coordinator and quarterbacks coach for Old Dominion University. He held that position in 2020 and 2021, leaving Old Dominion in November 2021.

=== Michigan ===
In 2022, Campbell joined the staff at the University of Michigan as an offensive analyst under Jim Harbaugh. In January 2023, he was promoted to serve as the program's quarterbacks coach. He coached J. J. McCarthy to being named the Big Ten Quarterback of the Year and Michigan to a national championship that season. On February 2, 2024, Campbell was promoted to offensive coordinator for the Michigan Wolverines, following the hiring of Sherrone Moore. On December 3, 2024, he was fired as offensive coordinator at the University of Michigan after one season. He spent three total seasons in Ann Arbor.

=== Los Angeles Chargers ===
On February 25, 2025, Campbell was hired by Jim Harbaugh, joining the Los Angeles Chargers as an offensive assistant.
