= Shaun Peterson Jr. =

American gridiron football player (born 1999)

- Peterson Jr. with the BC Lions in 2026

No. 49 – BC Lions
- Position: Linebacker
- Roster status: Active
- CFL status: American

Personal information
- Born: October 22, 1999 (age 27); Fort Lauderdale, Florida, U.S.
- Listed height: 6 ft 3 in (1.91 m)
- Listed weight: 240 lb (109 kg)

Career information
- High school: Nova (Davie, Florida)
- College: FIU (2018–2022); UCF (2023)
- NFL draft: 2024: undrafted

Career history
- Tampa Bay Buccaneers (2024)*; Calgary Stampeders (2025–2026); BC Lions (2026–present)
- * Offseason or practice squad member only

Career CFL statistics as of 2026
- Games played: 16
- Tackles: 22
- Sacks: 5
- Stats at CFL.ca
- Stats at Pro Football Reference

Shaun Peterson Jr. (born October 22, 1999) is an American professional football linebacker for the BC Lions of the Canadian Football League (CFL). He played college football for the FIU Panthers and UCF Knights.

== Early life ==
Peterson Jr. was born on October 22, 1999, in Fort Lauderdale, Florida. He attended Nova High School in Davie, Florida, where he played at linebacker and running back. Peterson Jr. had 1,234 rushing yards and 17 touchdowns as a senior. He originally committed to play college football at the University of South Florida before he flipped to Florida International University.

== College career ==
Peterson Jr. played college football for the FIU Panthers from 2018 to 2022 and UCF Knights in 2023. He spent his first four seasons at running back, recording 478 yards, four touchdowns with three receptions for 22 yards. In 2022, Peterson Jr. transitioned to outside linebacker and found immediate success, registering 28 tackles, including eight for loss, six sacks, two pass deflections, two forced fumbles and two fumble recoveries.

Peterson Jr. then transferred to the University of Central Florida for his final year. In 12 games, he had 14 tackles, one for loss, one sack and a forced fumble.

== Professional career ==
Pre-draft measurables
Height	Weight	Arm length	Hand span	Wingspan	40-yard dash	10-yard split	20-yard split	20-yard shuttle	Three-cone drill	Vertical jump	Broad jump	Bench press
6 ft 3 in (1.91 m)	236 lb (107 kg)	31 3/4 in (0.81 m)	8 3/4 in (0.22 m)	6 ft 5 in (1.96 m)	4.65 s	1.58 s	2.74 s	4.83 s	7.78 s	29 in (0.74 m)	8 ft 9 in (2.67 m)	24 reps
All values from Pro Day

=== Tampa Bay Buccaneers ===
On May 10, 2024, after going unselected in the 2024 NFL draft, Peterson Jr. signed with the Tampa Bay Buccaneers as a free agent. On September 5, 2025, he was released with an injury settlement.

=== Calgary Stampeders ===
On January 22, 2025, Peterson Jr. signed with the Calgary Stampeders of the Canadian Football League (CFL). On June 14, he made his CFL debut against the Toronto Argonauts and a special teams tackle. In seven games, Peterson Jr. had 11 tackles and three sacks. The following season he dressed in five games before he was released by the team on August 9, 2026. Peterson Jr. recorded six tackles and one sack.

=== BC Lions ===
On August 19, 2026, Peterson Jr. was signed by the BC Lions to the practice roster. On September 11, 2026, Peterson Jr. was promoted to the Lions' active roster. On September 24, 2026, Peterson Jr. was reassigned to the practice roster after having dressed for two games. On October 2, 2026, Peterson Jr. was again promoted to the Lions' active roster.
