= Grant Wells =

American football player (born 2000)

No. 6
- Position: Quarterback

Personal information
- Born: August 8, 2000 (age 26); Charleston, West Virginia, U.S.
- Listed height: 6 ft 2 in (1.88 m)
- Listed weight: 212 lb (96 kg)

Career information
- High school: George Washington
- College: Marshall (2019–2021); Virginia Tech (2022–2023)
- Stats at ESPN

Grant Wells (born August 8, 2000) is an American former college football player who was a quarterback for the Marshall Thundering Herd and Virginia Tech Hokies.

== College career ==
=== Marshall ===
As a redshirt freshman in 2020, Wells completed 165 of 270 passes for 2,091 yards and 18 touchdowns and 9 interceptions. In 2020, Marshall started 7-0 and #21 in the poll, but lost 20-0 to Rice and Wells threw 5 picks.

He was named to the Maxwell Award watch list prior to the 2021 season. In 2021, Wells repeated as a redshirt freshman. During the regular season, he completed 280 of 419 passes for 3,433 yards, 16 touchdowns, and 12 interceptions. He ranked 12th in passing yards among all Division I FBS players.

=== Virginia Tech ===
On January 6, 2022, Wells announced that he had transferred to Virginia Tech. On August 17, head coach Brent Pry announced that Wells would be the Hokies' week 1 starter against Old Dominion. In that game, however, Virginia Tech lost to the Monarchs 20-17; Wells threw 4 interceptions. In 2023, he started the first 2 games against Old Dominion and Purdue, but after being replaced by Baylor transfer Kyron Drones, he never started a game again.

=== Statistics ===
Year	Team	GP	Passing								Rushing			
Year	Team	GP	Cmp	Att	Pct	Yds	Y/A	TD	Int	Rtg	Att	Yds	Avg	TD
2019	Marshall	1	0	0	0.0	0	0.0	0	0	—	1	1	1.0	0
2020	Marshall	10	165	270	61.1	2,091	7.7	18	9	141.5	54	174	3.2	2
2021	Marshall	13	295	444	66.4	3,535	8.0	16	13	139.4	60	56	0.9	7
2022	Virginia Tech	11	196	332	59.0	2,171	6.5	9	9	117.5	111	212	1.9	6
2023	Virginia Tech	2	33	62	53.2	494	8.0	5	2	140.3	14	3	0.2	1
Career		37	689	1,109	62.1	8,288	7.5	48	33	133.2	240	446	1.9	16
