= Doink (disambiguation) =

Doink the Clown is a professional wrestling persona.

Doink may also refer to:

- "Doink", an episode of The Marvelous Mrs. Maisel
- Doink, in gridiron football, an unsuccessful field goal attempt that hits the goalpost but does not score a goal
  - Double Doink, the unsuccessful field goal attempt in the 2018 NFC Wild Card game
  - Quadruple doink, an unsuccessful field goal attempt in a 2020 Rice-Middle Tennessee college football game

== See also ==
- The Doink Years, a 1996 album by The Grifters
- "Doink doink", an often used ominous sound in the TV show Law & Order
