= 2020 Southern Miss Golden Eagles football team =

American college football season

2020 Southern Miss Golden Eagles football
- Conference: Conference USA
- West Division
- Record: 3–7 (2–4 C-USA)
- Head coach: Jay Hopson (5th season; first game); Scotty Walden (next four games); Tim Billings (remainder of season)
- Offensive coordinator: Matt Kubik (1st season)
- Co-offensive coordinator: Scotty Walden (2nd season)
- Offensive scheme: Pro spread
- Defensive coordinator: Tony Pecoraro (1st season)
- Base defense: Multiple
- Home stadium: M. M. Roberts Stadium

2020 Conference USA football standings
	Conf.			Overall
Team	W		L	W		L
East Division
Marshall xy	4	–	1	7	–	3
Florida Atlantic	4	–	2	5	–	4
Western Kentucky	4	–	3	5	–	7
Charlotte	2	–	2	2	–	4
Middle Tennessee	2	–	4	3	–	6
FIU	0	–	3	0	–	5
West Division
UAB xy$	3	–	1	6	–	3
UTSA	5	–	2	7	–	5
Louisiana Tech	4	–	2	5	–	5
North Texas	3	–	4	4	–	6
Rice	2	–	3	2	–	3
Southern Miss	2	–	4	3	–	7
UTEP	0	–	4	3	–	5
Championship: UAB 22, Marshall 13
$ – Conference champion; x – Division champion/co-champions; y – Championship game participant; Note: Due to COVID-19, Old Dominion opted out of the season.

The 2020 Southern Miss Golden Eagles football team represented the University of Southern Mississippi in the 2020 NCAA Division I FBS football season. The Golden Eagles played their home games at the M. M. Roberts Stadium in Hattiesburg, Mississippi, and competed in the West Division of Conference USA (CUSA). Head coach Jay Hopson, who was in his fifth year, resigned after one game and was replaced by interim head coach Scotty Walden. Walden himself resigned after four games to become the head coach at Austin Peay and was replaced by Tim Billings.

== Preseason ==
=== CUSA media days ===
The CUSA Media Days will be held virtually for the first time in conference history.

=== Preseason All-CUSA teams ===
To be released

== Schedule ==
Southern Miss announced its 2020 football schedule on January 8, 2020. The 2020 schedule consists of 6 home and 6 away games in the regular season.

The Golden Eagles had games scheduled against Auburn, Jackson State, Tennessee Tech and UTEP that were canceled due to the COVID-19 pandemic. It was announced on August 6, 2020 that Auburn would be replaced by Tulane and Jackson State would be replaced by Tennessee Tech.

Date	Time	Opponent	Site	TV	Result	Attendance
September 3	8:00 p.m.	South Alabama*	M. M. Roberts Stadium; Hattiesburg, MS	CBSSN	L 21–32	0
September 19	6:30 p.m.	Louisiana Tech	M. M. Roberts Stadium; Hattiesburg, MS (Rivalry in Dixie)	ESPN2	L 30–31	7,140
September 26	1:30 p.m.	Tulane*	M. M. Roberts Stadium; Hattiesburg, MS (Battle for the Bell)	Stadium	L 24–66	0
October 3	6:30 p.m.	at North Texas	Apogee Stadium; Denton, TX	Stadium	W 41–31	6,490
October 24	5:00 p.m.	at Liberty*	Williams Stadium; Lynchburg, VA	ESPN3	L 35–56	1,000
October 31	2:00 p.m.	Rice	M. M. Roberts Stadium; Hattiesburg, MS	ESPN3	L 6–30	0
November 7	2:00 p.m.	North Alabama*	M. M. Roberts Stadium; Hattiesburg, MS	ESPN3	W 24–13	0
November 14	5:00 p.m.	at Western Kentucky	Houchens Industries–L. T. Smith Stadium; Bowling Green, KY	CBSSN	L 7–10	3,815
November 21	2:00 p.m.	UTSA	M. M. Roberts Stadium; Hattiesburg, MS	ESPN+	L 20–23	0
December 10	5:30 p.m.	Florida Atlantic	M. M. Roberts Stadium; Hattiesburg, MS	CBSSN	W 45–31	0
*Non-conference game; Rankings from AP Poll and CFP Rankings after November 24 released prior to game; All times are in Central time

== Game summaries ==
=== South Alabama ===
South Alabama at Southern Mississippi

Team	1	2	3	4	Total
• Jaguars	13	0	10	6	29
Golden Eagles	0	10	3	8	21

- Date: September 3, 2020
- Location: M. M. Roberts Stadium
  Hattiesburg, MS
- Game start: 8:00 p.m. CDT
- Elapsed time: 3 hours and 39 minutes
- Game attendance: 7,500
- Game weather: 83 °F (28 °C) • Weather: Clear • Wind: SW 5 MPH
- Referee: Wayne Winkler
- TV announcers (CBS Sports Network): Carter Blackburn (play-by-play) and Aaron Taylor (analyst)

Scoring summary
1	13:57	USA	Jalen Tolbert 73 yard pass from Desmond Trotter (Tanner McGee 2-pt. pass failed) (3 plays, 75 yards, 1:03)	USA 6–0
1	01:30	USA	Terrion Avery 2 yard rush (Diego Guajardo kick) (9 plays, 99 yards, 3:47)	USA 13–0
2	10:27	USM	Don Ragsdale 2 yard rush (Briggs Bourgeois kick) (8 plays, 79 yards, 3:48)	USA 13–7
2	00:14	USM	Briggs Bourgeois 26 yard field goal (13 plays, 64 yards, 5:10)	USA 13–10
3	10:23	USA	Jalen Tolbert 31 yard pass from Desmond Trotter (Diego Guajardo kick) (10 plays, 56 yards, 3:37)	USA 20–10
3	06:56	USM	Briggs Bourgeois 28 yard field goal (10 plays, 55 yards, 3:27)	USA 20–13
3	02:15	USA	Diego Guajardo 21 yard field goal (12 plays, 85 yards, 4:41)	USA 23–13
4	10:20	USA	Kawaan Baker 52 yard pass from Chance Lovertich (Diego Guajardo kick failed) (7 plays, 80 yards, 3:48)	USA 29–13
4	05:42	USM	Naricuss Driver 1 yard rush (Luke Baker 2-pt. pass good) (11 plays, 75 yards, 4:38)	USA 29–21
4	01:40	USA	Diego Guajardo 34-yard field goal (8 plays, 59 yards, 4:02)	USA 32–21

Statistics	South Alabama	Southern Miss
First downs	23	20
Total yards	529	409
Rushing yards	166	95
Passing yards	363	314
Turnovers	2	0
Time of possession	29:08	30:52

Team	Category	Player	Statistics
South Alabama	Passing	Desmond Trotter	16/27, 299 yards, 2 TD, 2 INT
South Alabama	Rushing	Carlos Davis	15 carries, 85 yards
South Alabama	Receiving	Jalen Tolbert	6 yards, 169 yards, 2 TD
Southern Miss	Passing	Jack Abraham	22/32, 314 yards
Southern Miss	Rushing	Frank Gore Jr.	12 carries, 32 yards
Southern Miss	Receiving	Tim Jones	6 receptions, 139 yards

=== Louisiana Tech ===
Louisiana Tech at Southern Mississippi

Team	1	2	3	4	Total
• Bulldogs	7	3	14	7	31
Golden Eagles	0	13	14	3	30

- Date: September 19, 2020
- Location: M. M. Roberts Stadium
  Hattiesburg, MS
- Game start: 6:35 p.m. CDT
- Elapsed time: 3 hours and 24 minutes
- Game attendance: 7,140
- Game weather: 74 °F (23 °C) • Weather: Partly Cloudy • Wind: 7 NE MPH
- Referee: Billy Wiliams
- TV announcers (ESPN2): Dave Pasch (play–by–play), Mike Golic Sr. (analyst), and Lauren Sisler (sideline reporter)

Scoring summary
1	01:49	LT	Griffin Hebert 5-yard pass from Aaron Allen (Jacob Barnes kick) (15 plays, 79 yards, 7:09)	LT 7–0
2	12:00	USM	Kevin Perkins 1-yard rush (two-point conversion rush attempt failed) (11 plays, 67 yards, 4:49)	LT 7–6
2	06:08	LT	Jacob Barnes 28-yard field goal (10 plays, 55 yards, 5:52)	LT 10–6
2	05:44	USM	Tim Jones 74-yard pass from Jack Abraham (Briggs Bourgeois kick) (1 play, 74 yards, 0:24)	USM 13–10
3	13:58	USM	Tim Jones 20-yard pass from Jack Abraham (Briggs Bourgeois kick) (1 play, 20 yards, 0:09)	USM 20–10
3	07:36	USM	Jason Brownlee 5-yard pass from Jack Abraham (Briggs Bourgeois kick) (8 plays, 55 yards, 3:51)	USM 27–10
3	05:31	LT	Adrian Hardy 32-yard pass from Luke Anthony (Jacob Barnes kick) (7 plays, 65 yards, 2:05)	USM 27–17
3	00:29	LT	Smoke Harris 35-yard pass from Luke Anthony (Jacob Barnes kick) (4 plays, 46 yards, 1:10)	USM 27–24
4	05:06	USM	Briggs Bourgeois 37-yard field goal (13 plays, 57 yards, 5:51)	USM 30–24
4	00:14	LT	Griffin Hebert 4-yard pass from Luke Anthony (Jacob Barnes kick) (17 plays, 74 yards, 5:51)	LT 31–30

Statistics	Louisiana Tech	Southern Miss
First downs	26	20
Total yards	381	377
Rushing yards	163	137
Passing yards	218	240
Turnovers	1	1
Time of possession	27:52	27:02

Team	Category	Player	Statistics
Louisiana Tech	Passing	Luke Anthony	13/21, 149 yards, 3 TDs
Louisiana Tech	Rushing	Justin Henderson	18 carries, 69 yards
Louisiana Tech	Receiving	Adrian Hardy	5 receptions, 79 yards, 1 TD
Southern Miss	Passing	Jack Abraham	23/31, 240 yards, 3 TDs, 1 INT
Southern Miss	Rushing	Don Ragsdale	11 carries, 56 yards
Southern Miss	Receiving	Tim Jones	8 receptions, 160 yards, 2 TDs

=== Tulane ===
Tulane at Southern Mississippi

Team	1	2	3	4	Total
• Green Wave	7	24	21	14	66
Golden Eagles	14	7	3	0	24

- Date: September 26, 2020
- Location: M. M. Roberts Stadium
  Hattiesburg, MS
- Game start: 1:36 p.m. CDT
- Elapsed time: 3 hours and 44 minutes
- Game attendance: 0
- Game weather: 74 °F (23 °C) • Weather: Partly Sunny
- Referee: Joe Lehring
- TV announcers (Stadium): Chris Hassel (play–by–play) and A. J. Hawk (analyst)

Scoring summary
1	11:26	USM	Kevin Perkins 2-yard rush (Briggs Bourgeois kick) (9 plays, 75 yards, 3:34)	USM 0–7
1	10:31	USM	Jason Brownlee 88-yard pass from Jack Abraham (Briggs Bourgeois kick) (1 play, 88 yards, 0:14)	USM 0–14
1	06:58	TULN	Tyjae Spears 15-yard rush (Merek Glover kick) (12 play, 77 yards, 5:46)	USM 7–14
2	14:01	TULN	Tyjae Spears 15-yard rush (Merek Glover kick) (12 play, 77 yards, 5:46)	TIE 14–14
2	12:57	USM	Naricuss Driver 61-yard pass from Jack Abraham (Briggs Bourgeois kick) (3 play, 75 yards, 1:04)	USM 14–21
2	06:14	TULN	Cameron Carroll 16-yard pass from Michael Pratt (Merek Glover kick) (3 play, 35 yards, 1:00)	TIE 21–21
2	01:41	TULN	Merek Glover 41-yard field goal (10 play, 36 yards, 3:35)	TULN 24–21
2	00:41	TULN	Cameron Carroll 30-yard rush (Merek Glover kick) (3 play, 52 yards, 0:25)	TULN 31–21
3	14:36	TULN	Cameron Carroll 52-yard rush (Merek Glover kick) (2 play, 65 yards, 0:19)	TULN 38–21
3	10:18	USM	Briggs Bourgeois 49-yard field goal (10 play, 52 yards, 4:13)	TULN 38–24
3	04:49	TULN	Jha'Quan Jackson 42-yard pass from Michael Pratt (Merek Glover kick) (5 play, 75 yards, 1:15)	TULN 45–24
3	01:57	TULN	Stephon Huderson 47-yard rush (Merek Glover kick) (2 play, 47 yards, 0:15)	TULN 52–24
4	08:03	TULN	Michael Pratt 1-yard rush (Merek Glover kick) (13 play, 59 yards, 6:50)	TULN 59–24
4	03:03	TULN	Cameron Carroll 19-yard rush (Merek Glover kick) (6 play, 40 yards, 3:02)	TULN 66–24

Statistics	Tulane	Southern Miss
First downs	27	19
Total yards	572	369
Rushing yards	430	70
Passing yards	142	299
Turnovers	1	2
Time of possession	29:08	30:52

Team	Category	Player	Statistics
Tulane	Passing	Michael Pratt	8/18, 142 yards, 2 TDs
Tulane	Rushing	Cameron Carroll	15 carries, 163 yards, 3 TDs
Tulane	Receiving	Jha'Quan Jackson	1 reception, 42 yards, 1 TD
Southern Miss	Passing	Jack Abraham	23/38, 299 yards, 2 TDs, 1 INT
Southern Miss	Rushing	Dee Baker	6 carries, 44 yards
Southern Miss	Receiving	Jason Brownlee	3 receptions, 110 yards, 1 TD

=== At North Texas ===
Southern Mississippi at North Texas

Team	1	2	3	4	Total
• Golden Eagles	17	3	7	14	41
Mean Green	3	7	7	14	31

- Date: October 3, 2020
- Location: Apogee Stadium
  Denton, TX
- Game start: 6:36 p.m. CDT
- Elapsed time: 3 hours and 20 minutes
- Game attendance: 6,490
- Game weather: 81 °F (27 °C) • Weather: Sunny • Wind: NW 7 MPH
- Referee: Chris Bynum
- TV announcers (Stadium): Chris Hassel (play–by–play) and A. J. Hawk (analyst)

Scoring summary
1	12:36	UNT	Ethan Mooney 49-yard field goal (10 plays, 24 yards, 2:24)	UNT 3–0
1	11:30	USM	Demarcus Jones 22-yard pass from Jack Abraham (Briggs Bourgeois kick) (4 plays, 75 yards, 1:06)	USM 7–3
1	10:26	USM	Frank Gore Jr. 11-yard rush (Briggs Bourgeois kick) (3 plays, 24 yards, 1:04)	USM 14–3
1	08:42	USM	Briggs Bourgeois 31-yard field goal (4 plays, 6 yards, 1:26)	USM 21–3
2	01:54	UNT	Tre Siggers 1-yard rush (Ethan Mooney kick) (14 plays, 80 yards, 4:30)	USM 17–10
2	00:44	USM	Briggs Bourgeois 46-yard field goal (9 plays, 46 yards, 1:10)	USM 20–10
3	13:37	USM	Jason Brownlee 68-yard pass from Jack Abraham (Briggs Bourgeois kick) (3 plays, 75 yards, 1:23)	USM 27–10
3	09:23	UNT	Jaelon Darden 17-yard pass from Austin Aune (Ethan Mooney kick) (12 plays, 70 yards, 4:14)	USM 27–17
4	14:54	USM	Darius Maberry 4-yard rush (Briggs Bourgeois kick) (4 plays, 22 yards, 1:59)	USM 34–17
4	13:11	UNT	DeAndre Torrey 39-yard rush (Ethan Mooney kick) (8 plays, 74 yards, 1:43)	USM 34–24
4	06:16	USM	Darius Maberry 14-yard rush (Briggs Bourgeois kick) (12 plays, 75 yards, 6:55)	USM 41–24
4	05:16	UNT	Deonte Simpson 37-yard pass from Austin Aune (Ethan Mooney kick) (3 plays, 71 yards, 1:00)	USM 41–31

Statistics	Southern Miss	North Texas
First downs	22	27
Total yards	437	483
Rushing yards	202	144
Passing yards	235	339
Turnovers	1	3
Time of possession	35:16	24:44

Team	Category	Player	Statistics
Southern Miss	Passing	Jack Abraham	16/30, 235 yards, 2 TDs, 1 INT
Southern Miss	Rushing	Frank Gore Jr.	23 carries, 103 yards, 1 TD
Southern Miss	Receiving	Jason Brownlee	4 receptions, 110 yards, 1 TD
North Texas	Passing	Austin Aune	28/47, 339 yards, 2 TDs
North Texas	Rushing	DeAndre Torrey	15 carries, 82 yards, 1 TD
North Texas	Receiving	Deonte Simpson	5 receptions, 113 yards, 1 TD

=== At Liberty ===
Southern Mississippi at Liberty

Team	1	2	3	4	Total
Golden Eagles	7	0	21	7	35
• Flames	14	21	7	14	56

- Date: October 24, 2020
- Location: Williams Stadium
  Lynchburg, VA
- Game start: 12:00 p.m. CDT
- Elapsed time: 3 hours and 27 minutes
- Game attendance: 1,000
- Game weather: 80 °F (27 °C) • Weather: Sunny • Wind: W 5 MPH
- Referee: Billy Williams
- TV announcers (ESPN3): Matt Warner (play–by–play), Joe Jauch (analyst), Emily Austen (sideline reporter)

Scoring summary
1	12:00	USM	Tate Whatley 10 Yd Run (Briggs Bourgeois Kick) (7 plays, 75 yards, 3:00)	USM 7–0
1	11:14	LIB	Kevin Shaa 39 Yd pass from Malik Willis (Alex Barbir Kick) (3 plays, 65 yards, 0:46)	TIE 7–7
1	01:21	LIB	Demario Douglas 12 Yd pass from Malik Willis (Alex Barbir Kick) (12 plays, 88 yards, 6:15)	LIB 7–14
2	08:41	LIB	Kevin Shaa 11 Yd pass from Malik Willis (Alex Barbir Kick) (13 plays, 83 yards, 6:08)	LIB 7–21
2	05:46	LIB	Chris Barrett 18 Yd pass from Malik Willis (Alex Barbir Kick) (4 plays, 35 yards, 1:24)	LIB 7–28
2	00:15	LIB	Johnny Huntley 10 Yd pass from Malik Willis (Alex Barbir Kick) (6 plays, 44 yards, 3:51)	LIB 7–35
3	14:21	USM	Tate Whatley 16 Yd Run (Briggs Bourgeois Kick) (1 play, 16 yards, 0:07)	LIB 14–35
3	11:05	USM	Tate Whatley 1 Yd Run (Briggs Bourgeois Kick) (8 plays, 35 yards, 3:16)	LIB 21–35
3	03:27	USM	Tate Whatley 4 Yd Run (Briggs Bourgeois Kick) (13 plays, 94 yards, 4:34)	LIB 28–35
3	01:32	LIB	CJ Daniels 42 Yd pass from Malik Willis (Alex Barbir Kick) (6 plays, 75 yards, 1:55)	LIB 28–42
4	07:22	LIB	Malik Willis 38 Yd Run (Alex Barbir Kick) (1 play, 38 yards, 0:10)	LIB 28–49
4	01:27	LIB	Joshua Mack 1 Yd Run (Alex Barbir Kick) (7 plays, 63 yards, 4:07)	LIB 28–56
4	00:18	USM	Jason Brownlee 17 Yd pass from Tate Whatley (Briggs Bourgeois Kick) (5 plays, 67 yards, 1:09)	LIB 35–56

Statistics	Southern Miss	Liberty
First downs	19	25
Total yards	416	537
Rushing yards	215	192
Passing yards	201	345
Turnovers	1	1
Time of possession	27:37	32:23

Team	Category	Player	Statistics
Southern Miss	Passing	Tate Whatley	15/26, 188 yards, 1 TD, 1 INT
Southern Miss	Rushing	Tate Whatley	12 carries, 52 yards, 4 TDs
Southern Miss	Receiving	Jason Brownlee	5 receptions, 114, 1 TD
Liberty	Passing	Malik Willis	24/31, 345, 6 TDs
Liberty	Rushing	Malik Willis	12 carries, 97 yards, 1 TD
Liberty	Receiving	Demario Douglas	6 receptions, 115 yards, 1 TD

=== Rice ===
Rice at Southern Mississippi

Team	1	2	3	4	Total
• Owls	3	20	0	7	30
Eagles	0	6	0	0	6

- Date: October 31, 2020
- Location: M. M. Roberts Stadium
  Hattiesburg, MS
- Game start: 2:05 p.m. CDT
- Elapsed time: 2 hours and 59 minutes
- Game attendance: 0
- Game weather: 67 °F (19 °C) • Weather: Sunny • Wind: ESE 2 MPH
- Referee: Ken Antee
- TV announcers (ESPN3): Jason Baker (play–by–play) and Dustin Almond (analyst)

Scoring summary
1	02:03	RICE	Collin Riccitelli 21-yard field goal (14 plays, 80 yards, 7:17)	RICE 3–0
2	14:09	RICE	Austin Trammell 72-yard pass from Mike Collins (Collin Riccitelli kick) (2 plays, 75 yards, 0:51)	RICE 10–0
2	13:58	RICE	Jake Bailey 25-yard pass from Mike Collins (Collin Riccitelli PAT failed) (1 play, 25 yards, 0:11)	RICE 16–0
2	08:05	USM	Briggs Bourgeois 45-yard field goal (13 plays, 47 yards, 5:53)	RICE 16–3
2	02:04	RICE	Austin Trammell 13-yard pass from Mike Collins (Collin Riccitelli kick) (3 plays, 17 yards, 1:34)	RICE 23–3
2	00:00	USM	Briggs Bourgeois 26-yard field goal (4 plays, 32 yards, 0:26)	RICE 23–6
4	06:47	RICE	Austin Trammell 14-yard pass from Mike Collins (Collin Riccitelli kick) (16 plays, 88 yards, 9:00)	RICE 30–6

Statistics	Rice	Southern Miss
First downs	22	11
Total yards	412	269
Rushing yards	179	100
Passing yards	233	169
Turnovers	1	3
Time of possession	36:52	23:08

Team	Category	Player	Statistics
Rice	Passing	Mike Collins	12/17, 233 yards, 4 TDs
Rice	Rushing	Juma Otoviano	25 carries, 111 yards
Rice	Receiving	Austin Trammell	7 receptions, 143 yards, 3 TDs
Southern Miss	Passing	Jack Abraham	12/17, 112 yards, 1 INT
Southern Miss	Rushing	Frank Gore Jr.	11 carries, 71 yards
Southern Miss	Receiving	Antoine Robinson	3 receptions, 41 yards

=== North Alabama ===
North Alabama vs. Southern Mississippi

Team	1	2	3	4	Total
Lions	7	3	3	0	13
• Golden Eagles	0	7	0	17	24

- Date: November 7, 2020
- Location: M. M. Roberts Stadium
  Hattiesburg, MS
- Game start: 2:00 p.m. CDT
- Elapsed time:
- Game attendance:
- Game weather: • Weather: TBD • Wind: TBD MPH
- Referee:
- Television network: ESPN+

Scoring summary
1
2	{{{Event}}}
3	{{{Event}}}
4	{{{Event}}}

Statistics	North Alabama	Southern Miss
First downs		
Total yards		
Rushing yards		
Passing yards		
Turnovers		
Time of possession		

Team	Category	Player	Statistics
North Alabama	Passing		
North Alabama	Rushing		
North Alabama	Receiving		
Southern Miss	Passing		
Southern Miss	Rushing		
Southern Miss	Receiving		

=== At Western Kentucky ===
Southern Mississippi at Western Kentucky

Team	1	2	3	4	Total
Golden Eagles	0	0	0	7	7
• Hilltoppers	7	3	0	0	10

- Date: November 14, 2020
- Location: Houchens Industries–L. T. Smith Stadium
  Bowling Green, KY
- Game start: 2:37 p.m. CST
- Elapsed time: 3 hours and 3 minutes
- Game attendance: 3,815
- Game weather: 61 °F (16 °C) • Weather: Mostly Cloudy • Wind: SE 3 MPH
- Referee: Ken Antee
- TV announcers (CBS Sports Network): Dave Ryan (play–by–play) and Corey Chavous (analyst)

Scoring summary
1	09:07	WKU	Tyrrell Pigrome 5-yard rush (Brayden Narveson kick) (9 plays, 91 yards, 4:20)	WKU 7–0
2	12:54	WKU	Brayden Narveson 24-yard field goal (18 plays, 65 yards, 9:10)	WKU 10–0
4	10:30	USM	Kevin Perkins 6-yard rush (Briggs Bourgeois kick) (12 plays, 90 yards, 6:14)	WKU 10–7

Statistics	Southern Miss	Western Kentucky
First downs	13	19
Total yards	221	304
Rushing yards	154	121
Passing yards	67	183
Turnovers	0	0
Time of possession	25:18	34:42

Team	Category	Player	Statistics
Southern Miss	Passing	Trey Lowe	6/14, 67 yards
Southern Miss	Rushing	Kevin Perkins	8 carries, 71 yards, 1 TD
Southern Miss	Receiving	Antoine Robinson	2 receptions, 25 yards
Western Kentucky	Passing	Tyrrell Pigrome	19/30, 183 yards
Western Kentucky	Rushing	Jakairi Moses	12 carries, 40 yards
Western Kentucky	Receiving	Xavier Lane	5 receptions, 90 yards

=== UTSA ===
Texas–San Antonio at Southern Mississippi

Team	1	2	3	4	Total
• Roadrunners	0	9	14	0	23
Golden Eagles	3	7	3	7	20

- Date: November 21, 2020
- Location: M. M. Roberts Stadium
  Hattiesburg, MS
- Game start: 2:05 p.m. CST
- Elapsed time: 3 hours and 12 minutes
- Game attendance: 0
- Game weather: 75 °F (24 °C) • Weather: Sunny • Wind: Calm
- Referee: Chris Bynum
- TV announcers (ESPN+): Jason Baker (play–by–play) and Dustin Almond (analyst)

Scoring summary
1	07:27	USM	Briggs Bourgeois 37-yard field goal (10 plays, 66 yards, 4:59)	USM 3–0
2	12:19	UTSA	Team Safety (3 plays, -29 yards, 1:19)	USM 3–2
2	05:48	UTSA	Zakhari Franklin 6-yard pass from Frank Harris (Hunter Duplessis kick) (8 plays, 49 yards, 3:45)	UTSA 9–3
2	02:18	USM	Tim Jones 13-yard pass from Tate Whatley (Briggs Bourgeois kick) (8 plays, 75 yards, 3:30)	USM 10–9
3	13:19	UTSA	Sincere McCormick 69-yard rush (Hunter Duplessis kick) (4 plays, 80 yards, 1:41)	UTSA 16–10
3	06:30	UTSA	Sincere McCormick 1-yard rush (Hunter Duplessis kick) (9 plays, 48 yards, 4:35)	USM 23–10
3	00:34	USM	Briggs Bourgeois 27-yard field goal (8 plays, 79 yards, 2:58)	UTSA 23–13
4	10:19	USM	Frank Gore Jr. 51-yard pass from Tate Whatley (Briggs Bourgeois kick) (3 plays, 57 yards, 0:53)	UTSA 23–20

Statistics	UTSA	Southern Miss
First downs	16	18
Total yards	304	347
Rushing yards	233	75
Passing yards	71	272
Turnovers	1	1
Time of possession	31:30	28:30

Team	Category	Player	Statistics
UTSA	Passing	Frank Harris	12/19, 71 yards, 1 TD, 1 INT
UTSA	Rushing	Sincere McCormick	32 carries, 173 yards, 2 TDs
UTSA	Receiving	Joshua Cephus	5 receptions, 44 yards
Southern Miss	Passing	Tate Whatley	22/39, 272 yards, 2 TDs, 1 INT
Southern Miss	Rushing	Frank Gore Jr.	13 carries, 70 yards
Southern Miss	Receiving	Tim Jones	5 receptions, 65 yards, 1 TD

=== Florida Atlantic ===
Florida Atlantic at Southern Mississippi

Team	1	2	3	4	Total
Owls	7	10	14	0	31
• Golden Eagles	10	14	14	7	45

- Date: December 10, 2020
- Location: M. M. Roberts Stadium
  Hattiesburg, MS
- Game start: 5:30 p.m. CST
- Elapsed time: 2 hours & 40 minutes
- Game attendance: 0
- Game weather: 63 °F (17 °C) • Weather: Cloudy • Wind: SSW 2 MPH
- Referee: Ken Antee
- TV announcers (CBS Sports Network): Jason Knapp (play-by-play) and Corey Chavous (analyst)

Scoring summary
1	12:31	FAU	Brandon Robinson 20 yd pass from Nick Tronti (Vladimir Rivas kick) (1 plays, 20 yards, 0:06)	FAU 7-0
1	09:09	USM	Frank Gore Jr. 73 yard run (Briggs Bourgeois kick) (1 plays, 73 yards, 0:13)	7-7
1	01:34	USM	Briggs Bourgeois 38 yard field goal (12 plays, 60 yards, 5:17)	USM 10-7
2	11:18	FAU	Vladimir Rivas 40 yard field goal (12 plays, 48 yards, 5:16)	10-10
2	08:54	USM	Trey Lowe 13 yard run (Briggs Bourgeois kick) (6 plays, 75 yards, 2:24)	USM 17-10
2	04:39	FAU	James Charles 12 yard run (Vladimir Rivas kick) (7 plays, 77 yards, 4:15)	17-17
2	00:08	USM	Tim Jones 5 yard pass from Trey Lowe (Briggs Bourgeois kick) (13 plays, 75 yards, 4:31)	USM 24-17
3	11:08	USM	Jason Brownlee 43 yard pass from Trey Lowe (Briggs Bourgeois kick) (6 plays, 80 yards, 3:52)	USM 31-17
3	03:53	FAU	James Charles 1 yard run (Vladimir Rivas kick) (6 plays, 61 yards, TOP 2:28)	USM 31-24
3	03:39	USM	Camron Harrell 100 yard kickoff return (Briggs Bourgeois kick)	USM 38-24
3	00:54	FAU	Armani Adams 43 yard fumble recovery (Vladimir Rivas kick)	USM 38-31
4	04:55	USM	Kevin Perkins 3 yard run (Briggs Bourgeois kick) (9 plays, 90 yards, 5:23)	USM 45-31

Statistics	Florida Atlantic	Southern Miss
First downs	19	22
Total yards	326	514
Rushing yards	164	305
Passing yards	162	209
Turnovers	1	3
Time of possession	28:41	31:19

Team	Category	Player	Statistics
Florida Atlantic	Passing	Nick Tronti	17/33, 162 yards, 1 TD, 1 INT
Florida Atlantic	Rushing	James Charles	16 carries, 79 yards, 2 TD
Florida Atlantic	Receiving	Brandon Robinson	5 receptions, 72 yards, 1 TD
Southern Miss	Passing	Trey Lowe	13/19, 209 yards, 2 TD, 1 INT
Southern Miss	Rushing	Frank Gore Jr.	9 carries, 111 yards, 1 TD
Southern Miss	Receiving	Jason Brownlee	3 receptions, 81 yards, 1 TD
