= 2020 UTSA Roadrunners football team =

American college football season

2020 UTSA Roadrunners football

First Responder Bowl, L 24–31 vs. Louisiana
- Conference: Conference USA
- West Division
- Record: 7–5 (5–2 C-USA)
- Head coach: Jeff Traylor (1st season)
- Offensive coordinator: Barry Lunney Jr. (1st season)
- Offensive scheme: Pro-style
- Defensive coordinator: Tyrone Nix (1st season)
- Base defense: 3–4
- Home stadium: Alamodome

2020 Conference USA football standings
	Conf.			Overall
Team	W		L	W		L
East Division
Marshall xy	4	–	1	7	–	3
Florida Atlantic	4	–	2	5	–	4
Western Kentucky	4	–	3	5	–	7
Charlotte	2	–	2	2	–	4
Middle Tennessee	2	–	4	3	–	6
FIU	0	–	3	0	–	5
West Division
UAB xy$	3	–	1	6	–	3
UTSA	5	–	2	7	–	5
Louisiana Tech	4	–	2	5	–	5
North Texas	3	–	4	4	–	6
Rice	2	–	3	2	–	3
Southern Miss	2	–	4	3	–	7
UTEP	0	–	4	3	–	5
Championship: UAB 22, Marshall 13
$ – Conference champion; x – Division champion/co-champions; y – Championship game participant; Note: Due to COVID-19, Old Dominion opted out of the season.

The 2020 UTSA Roadrunners football team represented the University of Texas at San Antonio during the 2020 NCAA Division I FBS football season. The Roadrunners played their home games at the Alamodome in San Antonio, Texas, and competed in the West Division of Conference USA (CUSA). They were led by first-year head coach Jeff Traylor.

== Preseason ==
=== CUSA media days ===
The CUSA Media Days were held virtually for the first time in conference history. UTSA was predicted to finish in last place in the West Division.

== Schedule ==
UTSA announced its 2020 football schedule on January 8, 2020. The 2020 schedule consisted of 6 home and 6 away games in the regular season.

The Roadrunners had games scheduled against Grambling State, LSU, Old Dominion, and Rice that were canceled due to the COVID-19 pandemic.

On December 13, the Roadrunners accepted a bid to the Frisco Bowl, to face the SMU Mustangs. However, on December 15, the bowl was canceled due to COVID-19 concerns within the SMU program, and UTSA accepted an invitation to the First Responder Bowl.

Date	Time	Opponent	Site	TV	Result	Attendance
September 12	2:30 p.m.	at Texas State*	Bobcat Stadium; San Marcos, TX (I-35 Rivalry)	ESPN2	W 51–48 ^{2OT}	7,500
September 19	2:00 p.m.	Stephen F. Austin*	Alamodome; San Antonio, TX	ESPN2	W 24–10	6,611
September 25	7:00 p.m.	Middle Tennessee	Alamodome; San Antonio, TX	CBSSN	W 37–35	6,182
October 3	11:30 a.m.	at UAB	Legion Field; Birmingham, AL	Stadium/FSN	L 13–21	12,547
October 10	2:30 p.m.	at No. 15 BYU*	LaVell Edwards Stadium; Provo, UT	ESPN2	L 20–27	0
October 17	12:30 p.m.	Army*	Alamodome; San Antonio, TX	CBSSN	L 16–28	7,887
October 24	7:00 p.m.	Louisiana Tech	Alamodome; San Antonio, TX	ESPNU	W 27–26	6,114
October 31	11:00 a.m.	at Florida Atlantic	FAU Stadium; Boca Raton, FL	Stadium/FSN	L 3–24	5,026
November 14	2:00 p.m.	UTEP	Alamodome; San Antonio, TX	ESPN+	W 52–21	6,243
November 21	2:00 p.m.	at Southern Miss	M. M. Roberts Stadium; Hattiesburg, MS	ESPN+	W 23–20	0
November 28	2:00 p.m.	North Texas	Alamodome; San Antonio, TX	Stadium/FSN	W 49–17	5,936
December 26	2:30 p.m.	vs. No. 16 Louisiana*	Gerald J. Ford Stadium; Dallas, TX (First Responder Bowl)	ABC	L 24–31	3,512
*Non-conference game; Rankings from AP Poll released prior to the game; All times are in Central time

== Coaching staff ==
Name	Position	Seasons at UTSA	Alma Mater
Jeff Traylor	Head coach	1	Stephen F. Austin (1990)
Tyrone Nix	Defensive coordinator/linebackers	1	Southern Miss (1995)
Barry Lunney Jr.	Associate head coach/offensive coordinator/quarterbacks	1	Arkansas (1996)
Matt Mattox	Offensive Line/run game coordinator	1	Houston (2005)
Julian Griffin	Running backs	1	Louisiana–Monroe (2012)
Jess Loepp	Safeties/recruiting coordinator	1	University of Central Oklahoma (2000)
Kurt Traylor	Tight ends	1	Texas A&M–Commerce (1995)
Will Stein	Wide Receivers/passing game Coordinator	1	Louisville (2011)
Rod Wright	Defensive Line/run game coordinator	2	Texas (2011)
Nick Graham	Cornerbacks	1	Tulsa (2013)
Tommy Perry	Special teams coordinator	1	Texas A&M (2003)

== Game summaries ==
=== At Texas State ===
Texas–San Antonio at Texas State

Team	1	2	3	4	OT	2OT	Total
• Roadrunners	7	17	7	10	7	3	51
Bobcats	7	0	14	20	7	0	48

- Date: September 12, 2020
- Location: Bobcat Stadium
  Hattiesburg, MS
- Game start: 2:30 p.m. CDT
- Elapsed time: 4 hours and 0 minutes
- Game attendance: 7,500
- Game weather: 89 °F (32 °C) • Weather: Partly Cloudy • Wind: NNE 7 MPH
- Referee: Jeremy Parker
- Television network: ESPN2

Scoring summary
1	13:48	TXST	Brock Sturges 66-yard pass from Tyler Vitt (Alan Orona kick) (3 plays, 73 yards, 1:12)	TXST 7–0
1	13:23	UTSA	Frank Harris 17-yard rush (Hunter Duplessis kick) (2 plays, 75 yards, 0:25)	TIE 7–7
2	12:27	UTSA	Hunter Duplessis 27-yard field goal (12 plays, 62 yards, 4:17)	UTSA 10–7
2	03:43	UTSA	Frank Harris 19-yard rush (Hunter Duplessis kick) (6 plays, 63 yards, 2:19)	UTSA 17–7
2	00:44	UTSA	Sincere McCormick 5-yard rush (Hunter Duplessis kick) (9 plays, 66 yards, 1:52)	UTSA 24–7
3	11:28	TXST	Jah'Marae Sheread 31-yard pass from Tyler Vitt (Alan Orona kick) (4 plays, 59 yards, 1:34)	UTSA 24–14
3	04:48	UTSA	Frank Harris 13-yard rush (Hunter Duplessis kick) (4 plays, 75 yards, 1:40)	UTSA 31–14
3	02:04	TXST	Calvin Harris 12-yard rush (Alan Orona kick) (2 plays, 53 yards, 0:51)	UTSA 31–21
4	10:35	TXST	Brock Sturges 2-yard rush (Alan Orona kick) (11 plays, 91 yards, 4:31)	UTSA 31–28
4	07:26	UTSA	Hunter Duplessis 42-yard field goal (8 plays, 50 yards, 3:09)	UTSA 34–28
4	03:24	UTSA	Rashad Wisdom 81-yard interception returned (Hunter Duplessis kick) (10 plays, 59 yards, 4:02)	UTSA 41–28
4	01:51	TXST	Marcel Barbee 20-yard pass from Tyler Vitt (Alan Orona kick) (6 plays, 75 yards, 1:33)	UTSA 41–35
4	01:16	TXST	Jeremiah Haydel 91-yard punt returned (Alan Orona PAT failed) (3 plays, 0 yards, 0:35)	TIE 41–41
1OT		UTSA	Joshua Cephus 25-yard pass from Frank Harris (Hunter Duplessis kick) (3 plays, 25 yards)	UTSA 48–41
1OT		TXST	Marcel Barbee 4-yard pass from Tyler Vitt (Alan Orona kick) (6 plays, 25 yards)	TIE 48–48
2OT		UTSA	Hunter Duplessis 29-yard field goal (5 plays, 13 yards)	UTSA 51–48

Statistics	UTSA	Texas State
First downs	24	28
Total yards	499	474
Rushing yards	330	125
Passing yards	169	349
Turnovers	0	2
Time of possession	46:32	43:28

Team	Category	Player	Statistics
UTSA	Passing	Frank Harris	22/31, 169 yards, 1 TD
UTSA	Rushing	Sincere McCormick	29 carries, 197 yards, 1 TD
UTSA	Receiving	Brennon Dingle	4 receptions, 54 yards
Texas State	Passing	Tyler Vitt	26/39, 346 yards, 4 TDs, 2 INTs
Texas State	Rushing	Brock Sturges	17 carries, 67 yards, 1 TD
Texas State	Receiving	Marcel Barbee	4 receptions, 75 yards, 2 TDs

=== Stephen F. Austin ===
Stephen F. Austin at Texas–San Antonio

Team	1	2	3	4	Total
Lumberjacks	0	7	3	0	10
• Roadrunners	3	14	0	7	24

- Date: September 19, 2020
- Location: Alamodome
  San Antonio, TX
- Game start: 2:42 p.m. CDT
- Elapsed time: 3 hours and 25 minutes
- Game attendance: 6,611
- Game weather: 72 °F (22 °C) • Weather: Indoors (N/A)
- Referee: Chris Bynum
- TV announcers (ESPN2): Lincoln Rose (play–by–play) and LaDarrin McLane (analyst)

Scoring summary
1	11:34	UTSA	Hunter Duplessis 28-yard field goal (9 plays, 64 yards, 3:26)	UTSA 3–0
2	13:01	UTSA	Frank Harris 3-yard rush (Hunter Duplessis kick) (15 plays, 75 yards, 5:10)	UTSA 10–0
2	11:34	UTSA	Joshua Cephus 4-yard pass from Frank Harris (Hunter Duplessis kick) (9 plays, 63 yards, 1:50)	UTSA 17–0
2	00:02	SFA	Xavier Gipson 10-yard pass from Trae Self (Chris Campos kick) (4 plays, 72 yards, 0:33)	UTSA 17–7
3	06:06	SFA	Chris Campos 32-yard field goal (8 plays, 71 yards, 3:58)	UTSA 17–10
4	07:08	UTSA	Frank Harris 23-yard rush (Hunter Duplessis kick) (7 plays, 90 yards, 2:31)	UTSA 24–10

Statistics	Stephen F. Austin	UTSA
First downs	15	25
Total yards	344	498
Rushing yards	59	229
Passing yards	285	269
Turnovers	1	2
Time of possession	27:34	32:26

Team	Category	Player	Statistics
Stephen F. Austin	Passing	Trae Self	21/33, 285 yards, 1 TD
Stephen F. Austin	Rushing	Da'Leon Ward	12 carries, 41 yards
Stephen F. Austin	Receiving	Xavier Gipson	6 receptions, 94 yards, 1 TD
UTSA	Passing	Frank Harris	23/36, 269 yards, 1 TD, 1 INT
UTSA	Rushing	Frank Harris	17 carries, 104 yards, 2 TDs
UTSA	Receiving	Joshua Cephus	8 receptions, 89 yards, 1 TD

=== Middle Tennessee ===
Middle Tennessee at Texas–San Antonio

Team	1	2	3	4	Total
Blue Raiders	3	7	13	12	35
• Roadrunners	0	17	17	3	37

- Date: September 25, 2020
- Location: Alamodome
  San Antonio, TX
- Game start: 7:06 p.m. CDT
- Elapsed time: 3 hours and 35 minutes
- Game attendance: 6,182
- Game weather: 74 °F (23 °C) • Weather: Indoors (N/A)
- Referee: Jonathan Noli
- TV announcers (CBS Sports Network): Carter Blackburn (play–by–play), Aaron Murray (analyst), and Amanda Balionis (sideline reporter)

Scoring summary
1	08:20	MTSU	Crew Holt 26-yard field goal (10 plays, 64 yards, 3:36)	MTSU 3–0
2	11:11	UTSA	Zakhari Franklin 25-yard pass from Frank Harris (Hunter Duplessis kick) (1 play, 40 yards, 0:16)	UTSA 7–3
2	07:38	UTSA	Sincere McCormick 11-yard rush (Hunter Duplessis kick) (2 plays, 14 yards, 0:36)	UTSA 14–3
2	01:08	MTSU	Chaton Mobley 1-yard rush (Crews Holt kick) (9 plays, 91 yards, 2:19)	UTSA 14–10
2	00:00	UTSA	Hunter Duplessis 24-yard field goal (11 plays, 63 yards, 1:08)	UTSA 17–10
3	11:25	UTSA	Hunter Duplessis 27-yard field goal (9 plays, 64 yards, 3:35)	UTSA 20–10
3	08:30	MTSU	Chaton Mobley 4-yard pass from Asher O'Hara (Crews Holt PAT blocked) (7 plays, 75 yards, 2:55)	UTSA 20–16
3	06:40	UTSA	Chaton Mobley 24-yard rush (Crews Holt kick) (3 plays, 96 yards, 1:06)	MTSU 23–20
3	06:01	UTSA	Sincere McCormick 1-yard rush (Hunter Duplessis kick) (3 plays, 49 yards, 0:39)	UTSA 27–23
3	02:12	UTSA	Joshua Cephus 7-yard pass from Josh Adkins (Hunter Duplessis kick) (7 plays, 66 yards, 2:41)	UTSA 34–23
4	14:46	MTSU	DJ England-Chisolm 26-yard pass from Asher O'Hara (two-point conversion pass attempt failed) (9 plays, 75 yards, 2:26)	UTSA 34–29
4	11:39	UTSA	Hunter Duplessis 35-yard field goal (9 plays, 55 yards, 3:07)	UTSA 37–29
4	01:04	MTSU	Yusuf Ali 6-yard pass from Asher O'Hara (two-point conversion pass attempt failed) (13 plays, 72 yards, 4:43)	UTSA 37–35

Statistics	Middle Tennessee	UTSA
First downs	27	16
Total yards	563	391
Rushing yards	191	88
Passing yards	372	303
Turnovers	2	1
Time of possession	35:40	24:20

Team	Category	Player	Statistics
Middle Tennessee	Passing	Asher O'Hara	31/47, 372 yards, 3 TDs, 2 INTs
Middle Tennessee	Rushing	Jayy McDonald	7 carries, 76 yards
Middle Tennessee	Receiving	Jarrin Pierce	7 receptions, 107 yards
UTSA	Passing	Josh Adkins	16/28, 233 yards, 1 TD
UTSA	Rushing	Sincere McCormick	19 carries, 82 yards, 2 TDs
UTSA	Receiving	Zakhari Franklin	6 receptions, 119 yards, 1 TD

=== At UAB ===
Texas–San Antonio at Alabama–Birmingham

Team	1	2	3	4	Total
Roadrunners	3	3	0	7	13
• Blazers	7	7	7	0	21

- Date: October 3, 2020
- Location: Legion Field
  Birmingham, AL
- Game start: 11:30 a.m. CDT
- Elapsed time: 3 hours and 20 minutes
- Game attendance: 12,547
- Game weather: 73 °F (23 °C) • Weather: Clear
- Referee: Jonathan Noli
- TV announcers (Stadium): Chris Vosters (play–by–play) and Max Stark (analyst)

Scoring summary
1	09:40	UTSA	Hunter Duplessis 48-yard field goal (11 plays, 49 yards, 5:20)	UTSA 3–0
1	03:34	UAB	Myron Mitchell 18-yard pass from Bryson Lucero (Matthew Quinn kick) (4 plays, 88 yards, 1:48)	UAB 7–3
2	12:10	UAB	Gerrit Prince 15-yard pass from Bryson Lucero (Matthew Quinn kick) (5 plays, 30 yards, 2:18)	UAB 14–3
2	06:49	UTSA	Hunter Duplessis 35-yard field goal (7 plays, 25 yards, 2:11)	UAB 14–6
3	01:32	UAB	Gerrit Prince 21-yard pass from Bryson Lucero (Matthew Quinn kick) (10 plays, 90 yards, 5:38)	UAB 21–6
4	10:31	UTSA	Sincere McCormick 2-yard rush (Hunter Duplessis kick) (2 plays, 34 yards, 0:48)	UAB 21–13

Statistics	UTSA	UAB
First downs	17	21
Total yards	280	409
Rushing yards	190	214
Passing yards	90	195
Turnovers	1	4
Time of possession	26:53	33:07

Team	Category	Player	Statistics
UTSA	Passing	Jordan Weeks	7/19, 57 yards, 1 INT
UTSA	Rushing	Sincere McCormick	22 carries, 150 yards, 1 TD
UTSA	Receiving	Joshua Cephus	3 receptions, 42 yards
UAB	Passing	Bryson Lucero	18/29, 195 yards, 3 TDs, 3 INTs
UAB	Rushing	Spencer Brown	26 carries, 144 yards
UAB	Receiving	Myron Mitchell	6 receptions, 64 yards, 1 TD

=== At BYU ===
Texas–San Antonio at Brigham Young

Team	1	2	3	4	Total
Roadrunners	3	0	3	14	20
• No. 15 Cougars	0	14	7	6	27

- Date: October 10, 2020
- Location: LaVell Edwards Stadium
  Provo, UT
- Game start: 2:40 p.m. CDT
- Elapsed time: 3 hours and 35 minutes
- Game attendance: 0
- Game weather: 78 °F (26 °C) • Weather: Sunny • Wind: NW 8 MPH
- Referee: Scott Campbell
- TV announcers (ESPN2): Anish Shroff (play–by–play), Tom Luginbill (analyst), and Taylor McGregor (sideline reporter)

Scoring summary
1	04:55	UTSA	Hunter Duplessis 39-yard field goal (8 plays, 38 yards, 2:54)	UTSA 3–0
2	13:41	BYU	Neil Pau'u 4-yard pass from Zach Wilson (Justen Smith kick) (11 plays, 75 yards, 6:14)	BYU 7–3
2	04:44	BYU	Lopini Katoa 11-yard pass from Zach Wilson (Justen Smith kick) (5 plays, 45 yards, 2:33)	BYU 14–3
3	11:01	UTSA	Hunter Duplessis 36-yard field goal (10 plays, 56 yards, 3:59)	BYU 14–6
3	01:04	BYU	Zach Wilson 4-yard rush (Justen Smith kick) (7 plays, 90 yards, 3:23)	BYU 21–6
4	14:26	UTSA	Zakhari Franklin 32-yard pass from Lowell Narcisse (Hunter Duplessis kick) (5 plays, 65 yards, 1:26)	BYU 21–13
4	02:18	BYU	Tyler Allgeier 6-yard rush (Justen Smith PAT failed) (12 plays, 80 yards, 6:11)	BYU 27–13
4	01:17	UTSA	Brennon Dingle 34-yard pass from Lowell Narcisse (Hunter Duplessis kick) (4 plays, 75 yards, 1:01)	BYU 27–20

Statistics	UTSA	BYU
First downs	17	22
Total yards	359	470
Rushing yards	72	178
Passing yards	287	292
Turnovers	1	1
Time of possession	26:58	33:02

Team	Category	Player	Statistics
UTSA	Passing	Lowell Narcisse	17/20, 229 yards, 2 TDs
UTSA	Rushing	Sincere McCormick	11 carries, 42 yards
UTSA	Receiving	Zakhari Franklin	7 receptions, 79 yards, 1 TD
BYU	Passing	Zach Wilson	22/30, 292 yards, 2 TDs
BYU	Rushing	Tyler Allgeier	19 carries, 116 yards, 1 TD
BYU	Receiving	Dax Milne	7 receptions, 102 yards

=== Army ===
Army at Texas–San Antonio

Team	1	2	3	4	Total
• Black Knights	7	7	7	7	28
Roadrunners	0	10	0	6	16

- Date: October 17, 2020
- Location: Alamodome
  San Antonio, TX
- Game start: 12:35 p.m. CDT
- Elapsed time: 3 hours and 17 minutes
- Game attendance: 7,887
- Game weather: 74 °F (23 °C) • Weather: Indoors (N/A)
- Referee: Billy Williams
- TV announcers (CBS Sports Network): Dave Ryan (play–by–play), Corey Chavous (analyst), and Justin Walters (sideline reporter)

Scoring summary
1	10:03	ARMY	Anthony Adkins 66-yard rush (Landon Salyers kick) (5 plays, 90 yards, 2:43)	ARMY 7–0
2	14:48	UTSA	Hunter Duplessis 50-yard field goal (14 plays, 53 yards, 5:05)	ARMY 7–3
2	05:06	ARMY	Jakobi Buchanan 5-yard rush (Landon Salyers kick) (13 plays, 74 yards, 6:27)	ARMY 14–3
2	00:11	UTSA	Zakhari Franklin 1-yard pass from Lowell Narcisse (Hunter Duplessis kick) (14 plays, 87 yards, 4:55)	ARMY 14–10
3	04:04	ARMY	Tyhier Tyler 37-yard rush (Landon Salyers kick) (7 plays, 70 yards, 3:06)	ARMY 21–10
4	14:06	UTSA	Zakhari Franklin 11-yard pass from Frank Harris (Hunter Duplessis PAT blocked) (11 plays, 75 yards, 4:58)	ARMY 21–16
4	12:47	ARMY	Cade Ballard 5-yard rush (Landon Salyers kick) (4 plays, 75 yards, 1:19)	ARMY 28–16

Statistics	Army	UTSA
First downs	24	24
Total yards	358	383
Rushing yards	305	197
Passing yards	53	186
Turnovers	1	0
Time of possession	33:29	26:31

Team	Category	Player	Statistics
Army	Passing	Cade Ballard	1/3, 53 yards
Army	Rushing	Anthony Adkins	8 carries, 101 yards, 1 TD
Army	Receiving	Camden Harrison	1 receptions, 53 yards
UTSA	Passing	Lowell Narcisse	16/31, 155 yards, 1 TD
UTSA	Rushing	Sincere McCormick	18 carries, 133 yards
UTSA	Receiving	Zakhari Franklin	12 receptions, 138 yards, 2 TDs

=== Louisiana Tech ===
Louisiana Tech at Texas–San Antonio

Team	1	2	3	4	Total
Bulldogs	3	16	7	0	26
• Roadrunners	3	3	7	14	27

- Date: October 24, 2020
- Location: Alamodome
  San Antonio, TX
- Game start: 7:04 p.m. CDT
- Elapsed time: 3 hours and 37 minutes
- Game attendance: 6,114
- Game weather: 74 °F (23 °C) • Weather: N/A (Indoors)
- Referee: Ken Antee
- TV announcers (ESPNU): Mike Couzens (play–by–play) and Jay Walker (analyst)

Scoring summary
1	08:50	LT	Jacob Barnes 27-yard field goal (13 plays, 63 yards, 6:10)	LT 3–0
1	04:28	UTSA	Hunter Duplessis 21-yard field goal (14 plays, 56 yards, 5:46)	TIE 3–3
2	14:03	LT	Jacob Barnes 46-yard field goal (6 plays, 14 yards, 1:59)	LT 6–3
2	09:22	LT	Jacob Barnes 22-yard field goal (10 plays, 29 yards, 3:49)	LT 9–3
2	06:36	UTSA	Hunter Duplessis 37-yard field goal (10 plays, 55 yards, 2:46)	LT 9–6
2	03:43	LT	Jacob Adams 13-yard pass from Luke Anthony (Jacob Barnes kick) (7 plays, 72 yards, 2:53)	LT 16–6
2	00:29	LT	Jacob Barnes 24-yard field goal (8 plays, 40 yards, 1:38)	LT 19–6
3	09:36	UTSA	Sincere McCormick 2-yard rush (Hunter Duplessis kick) (15 plays, 75 yards, 5:24)	LT 19–13
3	06:32	LT	Ezekial Barnett 60-yard interception returned (Jacob Barnes kick) (3 plays, 4 yards, 1:19)	LT 26–13
4	10:28	UTSA	Sincere McCormick 6-yard rush (Hunter Duplessis kick) (3 plays, 71 yards, 0:35)	LT 26–20
4	06:16	UTSA	Sincere McCormick 45-yard rush (Hunter Duplessis kick) (7 plays, 80 yards, 2:43)	UTSA 27–26

Statistics	Louisiana Tech	UTSA
First downs	15	25
Total yards	247	385
Rushing yards	78	188
Passing yards	169	197
Turnovers	2	2
Time of possession	27:39	32:21

Team	Category	Player	Statistics
Louisiana Tech	Passing	Luke Anthony	22/33, 148 yards, 1 TD
Louisiana Tech	Rushing	Israel Tucker	19 carries, 70 yards
Louisiana Tech	Receiving	Cee Jay Powell	8 receptions, 54 yards
UTSA	Passing	Frank Harris	18/33, 189 yards, 2 INTs
UTSA	Rushing	Sincere McCormick	37 carries, 165 yards, 3 TDs
UTSA	Receiving	Tykee Ogle-Kellogg	4 receptions, 96 yards

=== At Florida Atlantic ===
Texas–San Antonio at Florida Atlantic

Team	1	2	3	4	Total
Roadrunners	0	3	0	0	3
• Owls	10	7	0	7	24

- Date: October 31, 2020
- Location: FAU Stadium
  Boca Raton, FL
- Game start: 11:00 a.m. CDT
- Elapsed time: 3 hours and 18 minutes
- Game attendance: 5,026
- Game weather: 82 °F (28 °C) • Weather: Humid/Partly Cloudy • Wind: ESE 6 MPH
- Referee: Chris Bynum
- TV announcers (Stadium): Chris Vosters (play-by-play) and Max Stark (analyst)

Scoring summary
1	10:53	FAU	Vladimir Rivas 24 yard field goal (10 plays, 58 yards, 4:07)	FAU 3–0
1	04:55	FAU	Aaron Young 27 yard pass from Nick Tronti (Vladimir Rivas kick) (10 plays, 80 yards, 4:00)	FAU 10–0
2	08:55	UTSA	Hunter Duplessis 49 yard field goal (15 plays, 43 yards, 6:08)	FAU 10–3
2	01:58	FAU	Nick Tronti 2 yard run (Vladimir Rivas kick) (9 plays, 80 yards, 3:46)	FAU 17–3
4	02:35	FAU	James Charles 2 yard run (Vladimir Rivas kick) (5 plays, 19 yards, 1:03)	FAU 24–3

Statistics	UTSA	Florida Atlantic
First downs	16	19
Total yards	230	332
Rushing yards	104	196
Passing yards	126	136
Turnovers	0	0
Time of possession	27:54	32:06

Team	Category	Player	Statistics
UTSA	Passing	Frank Harris	12/26, 109 yards
UTSA	Rushing	Frank Harris	14 carries, 66 yards
UTSA	Receiving	Joshua Cephus	5 receptions, 63 yards
Florida Atlantic	Passing	Nick Tronti	11/19, 136 yards, 1 TD
Florida Atlantic	Rushing	Malcolm Davidson	14 carries, 115 yards
Florida Atlantic	Receiving	Aaron Young	3 receptions, 54 yards, 1 TD

=== UTEP ===
Texas–El Paso at Texas–San Antonio

Team	1	2	3	4	Total
Miners	7	14	0	0	21
• Roadrunners	3	21	14	14	52

- Date: November 14, 2020
- Location: Alamodome
  San Antonio, TX
- Game start: 12:08 p.m. CST
- Elapsed time: 2 hours and 57 minutes
- Game attendance: 6,243
- Game weather: Temperature: 74 °F (23 °C) • Weather: Indoors • Wind: N/A
- Referee: Rodney Burnette
- TV announcers (ESPN+): Lincoln Rose (play–by–play) and LaDarrin McLane (analyst)

Scoring summary
1	11:49	UTSA	Hunter Duplessis 49–yard field goal (10 plays, 43 yards, 3:11)	UTSA 3–0
1	02:22	UTEP	Jacob Cowing 52–yard pass from Gavin Hardison (Gavin Baechle kick) (6 plays, 80 yards, 2:41)	UTEP 7–3
2	12:44	UTSA	Brennon Dingle 3–yard pass from Frank Harris (Hunter Duplessis kick) (6 plays, 80 yards, 2:16)	UTSA 10–7
2	03:32	UTEP	Calvin Brownholtz 1–yard run (Gavin Baechle kick) (10 plays, 74 yards, 4:55)	UTEP 14–10
2	01:35	UTSA	Zakhari Franklin 35–yard pass from Frank Harris (Hunter Duplessis kick) (6 plays, 71 yards, 1:57)	UTSA 17–14
2	00:58	UTEP	Deion Hankins 1–yard run (Gavin Baechle kick) (2 plays, 5 yards, 0:37)	UTEP 21–17
2	00:19	UTSA	Frank Harris 35–yard run (Hunter Duplessis kick) (3 plays, 70 yards, 0:39)	UTSA 24–21
3	08:26	UTSA	Tykee Ogle–Kellogg 15–yard pass from Frank Harris (Hunter Duplessis kick) (9 plays, 80 yards, 3:05)	UTSA 31–21
3	02:54	UTSA	Frank Harris 4–yard run (Hunter Duplessis kick) (9 plays, 46 yards, 4:25)	UTSA 38–21
4	11:05	UTSA	Kaedric Cobbs 1–yard run (Hunter Duplessis kick) (8 plays, 59 yards, 4:24)	UTSA 45–21
4	03:16	UTSA	B.J. Daniels 5–yard run (Hunter Duplessis kick) (11 plays, 89 yards, 6:07)	UTSA 52–21

Statistics	UTEP	UTSA
First downs	13	29
Total yards	246	600
Rushing yards	77	288
Passing yards	169	312
Turnovers	7	4
Time of possession	27:08	32:52

Team	Category	Player	Statistics
UTEP	Passing	Gavin Hardison	14/21, 159 yards, 1 TD
UTEP	Rushing	Deion Hankins	16 carries, 74 yards, 1 TD
UTEP	Receiving	Jacob Cowing	2 receptions, 58 yards, 1 TD
UTSA	Passing	Frank Harris	22/26, 312 yards, 3 TDs
UTSA	Rushing	Brenden Brady	26 carries, 124 yards
UTSA	Receiving	Zakhari Franklin	6 receptions, 118 yards, 1 TD

=== At Southern Miss ===
Texas–San Antonio at Southern Mississippi

Team	1	2	3	4	Total
• Roadrunners	0	9	14	0	23
Golden Eagles	3	7	3	7	20

- Date: November 21, 2020
- Location: M. M. Roberts Stadium
  Hattiesburg, MS
- Game start: 2:05 p.m. CST
- Elapsed time: 3 hours and 12 minutes
- Game attendance: 0
- Game weather: 75 °F (24 °C) • Weather: Sunny • Wind: Calm
- Referee: Chris Bynum
- TV announcers (ESPN+): Jason Baker (play–by–play) and Dustin Almond (analyst)

Scoring summary
1	07:27	USM	Briggs Bourgeois 37-yard field goal (10 plays, 66 yards, 4:59)	USM 3–0
2	12:19	UTSA	Team Safety (3 plays, -29 yards, 1:19)	USM 3–2
2	05:48	UTSA	Zakhari Franklin 6-yard pass from Frank Harris (Hunter Duplessis kick) (8 plays, 49 yards, 3:45)	UTSA 9–3
2	02:18	USM	Tim Jones 13-yard pass from Tate Whatley (Briggs Bourgeois kick) (8 plays, 75 yards, 3:30)	USM 10–9
3	13:19	UTSA	Sincere McCormick 69-yard rush (Hunter Duplessis kick) (4 plays, 80 yards, 1:41)	UTSA 16–10
3	06:30	UTSA	Sincere McCormick 1-yard rush (Hunter Duplessis kick) (9 plays, 48 yards, 4:35)	USM 23–10
3	00:34	USM	Briggs Bourgeois 27-yard field goal (8 plays, 79 yards, 2:58)	UTSA 23–13
4	10:19	USM	Frank Gore Jr. 51-yard pass from Tate Whatley (Briggs Bourgeois kick) (3 plays, 57 yards, 0:53)	UTSA 23–20

Statistics	UTSA	Southern Miss
First downs	16	18
Total yards	304	347
Rushing yards	233	75
Passing yards	71	272
Turnovers	1	1
Time of possession	31:30	28:30

Team	Category	Player	Statistics
UTSA	Passing	Frank Harris	12/19, 71 yards, 1 TD, 1 INT
UTSA	Rushing	Sincere McCormick	32 carries, 173 yards, 2 TDs
UTSA	Receiving	Joshua Cephus	5 receptions, 44 yards
Southern Miss	Passing	Tate Whatley	22/39, 272 yards, 2 TDs, 1 INT
Southern Miss	Rushing	Frank Gore Jr.	13 carries, 70 yards
Southern Miss	Receiving	Tim Jones	5 receptions, 65 yards, 1 TD

=== North Texas ===
North Texas at Texas–San Antonio

Team	1	2	3	4	Total
Mean Green	0	7	3	7	17
• Roadrunners	7	21	7	14	49

- Date: November 28, 2020
- Location: Alamodome
  San Antonio, TX
- Game start: 2:06 p.m. CST
- Elapsed time: 3 hours and 3 minutes
- Game attendance: 5,936
- Game weather: 72 °F (22 °C)
- Referee: Ken Antee
- TV announcers (FOX Sports SW): Chris Vosters (play–by–play) and Max Starks (analyst)

Scoring summary
1	02:38	UTSA	Frank Harris 19-yard rush (Hunter Duplessis kick) (9 plays, 80 yards, 2:47)	UTSA 7–0
2	11:10	UTSA	Joshua Cephus 8-yard pass from Frank Harris (Hunter Duplessis kick) (9 plays, 78 yards, 3:50)	UTSA 14–0
2	10:58	UNT	Jaelon Darden 75-yard pass from Jason Bean (Ethan Mooney kick) (1 play, 75 yards, 0:12)	UTSA 14–7
2	10:26	UTSA	Sincere McCormick 65-yard rush (Hunter Duplessis kick) (2 plays, 71 yards, 0:32)	UTSA 21–7
2	01:22	UTSA	De'Corian Clark 15-yard pass from Frank Harris (Hunter Duplessis kick) (5 plays, 51 yards, 2:16)	UTSA 28–7
3	06:12	UNT	Ethan Mooney 23-yard field goal (15 plays, 78 yards, 4:21)	UTSA 28–10
3	04:55	UTSA	Brenden Brady 4-yard rush (Hunter Duplessis kick) (3 plays, 74 yards, 1:17)	UTSA 35–10
4	14:02	UTSA	Sincere McCormick 18-yard rush (Hunter Duplessis kick) (6 plays, 65 yards, 4:08)	UTSA 42–10
4	07:12	UTSA	B. J. Daniels 9-yard rush (Hunter Duplessis kick) (7 plays, 69 yards, 5:42)	UTSA 49–10
4	03:40	UNT	Jason Pirtle 8-yard pass from Jason Bean (Ethan Mooney kick) (11 plays, 87 yards, 3:32)	UTSA 49–17

Statistics	North Texas	UTSA
First downs	19	26
Total yards	401	624
Rushing yards	184	443
Passing yards	217	181
Turnovers	2	0
Time of possession	24:19	35:41

Team	Category	Player	Statistics
North Texas	Passing	Austin Aune	9/19, 115 yards
North Texas	Rushing	Oscar Adaway III	15 carries, 101 yards
North Texas	Receiving	Jaelon Darden	8 receptions, 143 yards, 1 TD
UTSA	Passing	Frank Harris	19/24, 144 yards, 2 TDs
UTSA	Rushing	Sincere McCormick	23 carries, 251 yards, 2 TDs
UTSA	Receiving	Zakhari Franklin	3 receptions, 49 yards

=== Vs. Louisiana (First Responder Bowl) ===
Louisiana vs. Texas–San Antonio

Team	1	2	3	4	Total
• No. 19 Ragin' Cajuns	7	10	7	7	31
Roadrunners	0	7	14	3	24

- Date: December 26, 2020
- Location: Gerald J. Ford Stadium
  University Park, TX
- Game start: 2:36 p.m. CST
- Elapsed time: 3 hours and 19 minutes
- Game attendance: 3,512
- Game weather: 70 °F (21 °C) • Weather: Sunny • Wind: S 15 MPH
- Referee: Riley Johnson
- TV announcers (ABC): Anish Shroff (play–by–play), Tom Luginbill (analyst), and Quint Kessenich (sideline reporter)

Scoring summary
1	10:43	LA	Jalen Williams 15-yard pass from Levi Lewis (Kenneth Almendares kick) (8 plays, 68 yards, 4:17)	LA 7–0
2	08:27	LA	Kenneth Almendares 31-yard field goal (11 plays, 61 yards, 4:35)	LA 10–0
2	04:33	UTSA	Frank Harris 11-yard rush (Hunter Duplessis kick) (9 plays, 75 yards, 3:54)	LA 10–7
2	01:21	LA	Kyren Lacy 10-yard pass from Levi Lewis (Kenneth Almendares kick) (8 plays, 74 yards, 3:12)	LA 17–7
3	14:19	LA	Elijah Mitchell 3-yard rush (Kenneth Almendares kick) (1 play, 3 yards, 0:04)	LA 24–7
3	10:14	UTSA	Zakhari Franklin 29-yard pass from Frank Harris (Hunter Duplessis kick) (4 plays, 62 yards, 1:00)	LA 24–14
3	04:09	UTSA	Joshua Cephus 10-yard pass from Frank Harris (Hunter Duplessis kick) (6 plays, 89 yards, 2:24)	LA 24–21
4	13:32	UTSA	Hunter Duplessis 20-yard field goal (9 plays, 82 yards, 3:33)	TIE 24–24
4	07:16	LA	Trey Ragas 1-yard rush (Kenneth Almendares kick) (12 plays, 72 yards, 6:16)	LA 31–24

Statistics	Louisiana	UTSA
First downs	23	27
Total yards	411	431
Rushing yards	265	223
Passing yards	146	208
Turnovers	1	2
Time of possession	32:37	27:23

Team	Category	Player	Statistics
Louisiana	Passing	Levi Lewis	12/22, 146 yards, 2 TDs
Louisiana	Rushing	Elijah Mitchell	19 carries, 127 yards, 1 TD
Louisiana	Receiving	Elijah Mitchell	2 receptions, 45 yards
UTSA	Passing	Frank Harris	13/21, 208 yards, 2 TDs, 1 INT
UTSA	Rushing	Sincere McCormick	23 carries, 122 yards
UTSA	Receiving	Zakhari Franklin	5 receptions, 115 yards, 1 TD
