= 2020 Marshall Thundering Herd football team =

American college football season

2020 Marshall Thundering Herd football

C-USA East Division champion

C-USA Championship Game, L 13–22 vs. UAB

Camellia Bowl, L 10–17 vs. Buffalo
- Conference: Conference USA
- East Division
- Record: 7–3 (4–1 C-USA)
- Head coach: Doc Holliday (11th season)
- Offensive coordinator: Tim Cramsey (3rd season)
- Offensive scheme: Pro spread
- Defensive coordinator: Brad Lambert (2nd season)
- Co-defensive coordinator: J. C. Price (2nd season)
- Base defense: 4–2–5
- Home stadium: Joan C. Edwards Stadium

2020 Conference USA football standings
| | Conf. | | | Overall |
| Team | W | | L | W | | L |
|---|---|---|---|---|---|---|
East Division
| Marshall xy | 4 | – | 1 | 7 | – | 3 |
| Florida Atlantic | 4 | – | 2 | 5 | – | 4 |
| Western Kentucky | 4 | – | 3 | 5 | – | 7 |
| Charlotte | 2 | – | 2 | 2 | – | 4 |
| Middle Tennessee | 2 | – | 4 | 3 | – | 6 |
| FIU | 0 | – | 3 | 0 | – | 5 |
West Division
| UAB xy$ | 3 | – | 1 | 6 | – | 3 |
| UTSA | 5 | – | 2 | 7 | – | 5 |
| Louisiana Tech | 4 | – | 2 | 5 | – | 5 |
| North Texas | 3 | – | 4 | 4 | – | 6 |
| Rice | 2 | – | 3 | 2 | – | 3 |
| Southern Miss | 2 | – | 4 | 3 | – | 7 |
| UTEP | 0 | – | 4 | 3 | – | 5 |
Championship: UAB 22, Marshall 13
$ – Conference champion; x – Division champion/co-champions; y – Championship game participant; Note: Due to COVID-19, Old Dominion opted out of the season.

The 2020 Marshall Thundering Herd football team represented Marshall University in the 2020 NCAA Division I FBS football season. The Thundering Herd played their home games at Joan C. Edwards Stadium in Huntington, West Virginia, and competed in the East Division of Conference USA (CUSA). They were led by eleventh-year head coach Doc Holliday.

The game against Middle Tennessee marked the 50th anniversary of the crash of Southern Airways Flight 932, which took place on November 14, 1970, and killed 75 people, 70 of whom were connected to the Marshall football program.

== Preseason ==
=== CUSA media days ===
The CUSA Media Days will be held virtually for the first time in conference history.

== Schedule ==
Marshall announced its 2020 football schedule on January 8, 2020. The 2020 schedule originally consisted of 6 home and 6 away games in the regular season.

The Thundering Herd had games scheduled against Boise State, East Carolina, Ohio, Old Dominion, and Pittsburgh, which were canceled due to the COVID-19 pandemic These were partially replaced with games against Appalachian State, Eastern Kentucky, and UMass.

| Date | Time | Opponent | Rank | Site | TV | Result | Attendance |
|---|---|---|---|---|---|---|---|
| September 5 | 1:30 p.m. | Eastern Kentucky* | | Joan C. Edwards Stadium; Huntington, WV | ESPN | W 59–0 | 12,001 |
| September 19 | 3:30 p.m. | No. 23 Appalachian State* | | Joan C. Edwards Stadium; Huntington, WV (rivalry) | CBS | W 17–7 | 12,050 |
| October 10 | 7:30 p.m. | at Western Kentucky | | Houchens Industries–L. T. Smith Stadium; Bowling Green, KY | Stadium | W 38–14 | 4,428 |
| October 17 | 6:00 p.m. | at Louisiana Tech | | Joe Aillet Stadium; Ruston, LA | CBSSN | W 35–17 | 7,140 |
| October 24 | 2:30 p.m. | Florida Atlantic^{†} | No. 22 | Joan C. Edwards Stadium; Huntington, WV | Stadium | W 20–9 | 12,002 |
| November 7 | 2:30 p.m. | UMass* | No. 16 | Joan C. Edwards Stadium; Huntington, WV | ESPN+ | W 51–10 | 11,711 |
| November 14 | 12:00 p.m. | Middle Tennessee | No. 16 | Joan C. Edwards Stadium; Huntington, WV | CBSSN | W 42–14 | 12,224 |
| December 5 | 12:00 p.m. | Rice | No. 21 | Joan C. Edwards Stadium; Huntington, WV | ESPN+ | L 0–20 | 10,429 |
| December 18 | 7:00 p.m. | UAB | | Joan C. Edwards Stadium; Huntington, WV (C-USA Championship Game) | CBSSN | L 13–22 | 8,324 |
| December 25 | 2:30 p.m. | vs. Buffalo* | | Cramton Bowl; Montgomery, AL (Camellia Bowl) | ESPN | L 10–17 | 2,512 |
*Non-conference game; ^{†}Homecoming; Rankings from AP Poll and CFP Rankings after November 24 released prior to game; All times are in Eastern time

== Game summaries ==
=== Eastern Kentucky ===
Game One – Eastern Kentucky Colonels at Marshall Thundering Herd

| Quarter | 1 | 2 | 3 | 4 | Total |
|---|---|---|---|---|---|
| Colonels | 0 | 0 | 0 | 0 | 0 |
| Thundering Herd | 21 | 17 | 14 | 7 | 59 |

at Joan C. Edwards Stadium • Huntington, West Virginia

- Date: Saturday, September 5, 2020
- Game time: 1:00 p.m. EDT
- Game weather: Clear • Temperature: 77 °F (25 °C) • Wind: ENE 3 mph
- Game attendance: 12,000
- TV announcers (ESPN): Jason Benetti (play-by-play), Andre Ware (analyst), Katie George (sideline)

Game information

First quarter

- (12:19) MRSH – Xavier Gaines 22 yard pass from Grant Wells, Shane Ciucci kick (Drive: 7 plays, 72 yards, 2:41; Marshall 7–0)
- (8:04) MRSH – Brendan Knox 8 yard rush, Shane Ciucci kick (Drive: 4 plays, 70 yards, 1:31; Marshall 14–0)
- (2:01) MRSH – Talik Keaton 21 yard pass from Grant Wells, Shane Ciucci kick (Drive: 5 plays, 65 yards, 2:05; Marshall 21–0)

Second quarter

- (10:02) MRSH – Garet Morrell 2 yard pass from Grant Wells, Shane Ciucci kick (Drive: 15 plays, 72 yards, 6:12; Marshall 28–0)
- (6:07) MRSH – Shane Ciucci 23 yard field goal (Drive: 7 plays, 49 yards, 1:37; Marshall 31–0)
- (3:07) MRSH – Jaron Woodyard 42 yard pass from Grant Wells, Shane Ciucci kick (Drive: 1 play, 42 yards, 0:06; Marshall 38–0)

Third quarter

- (7:04) MRSH – Sheldon Evans 6 yard rush, Shane Ciucci kick (Drive: 12 plays, 90 yards, 5:05; Marshall 45–0)
- (0:43) MRSH – Lawrence Papillon 13 yard rush, Shane Ciucci kick (Drive: 7 plays, 63 yards, 2:47; Marshall 52–0)

Fourth quarter

- (4:02) MRSH – Amir Richardson 3 yard pass from Luke Zban, Shane Ciucci kick (Drive: 15 plays, 75 yards, 8:22; Marshall 59–0)

| Statistics | EKU | MRSH |
|---|---|---|
| First downs | 7 | 34 |
| Plays–yards | 47–166 | 83–627 |
| Rushes–yards | 31–86 | 54–282 |
| Passing yards | 80 | 345 |
| Passing: comp–att–int | 10–16–1 | 22–29–0 |
| Time of possession | 25:37 | 34:23 |

| Team | Category | Player | Statistics |
|---|---|---|---|
| Eastern Kentucky | Passing | Parker McKinney | 7/10, 71 yards, 1 INT |
| Eastern Kentucky | Rushing | Quentin Pringle | 6 carries, 39 yards |
| Eastern Kentucky | Receiving | Keyion Dixon | 3 receptions, 34 yards |
| Marshall | Passing | Grant Wells | 16/23, 307 yards, 4 TD |
| Marshall | Rushing | Knowledge McDaniel | 14 carries, 93 yards |
| Marshall | Receiving | Talik Keaton | 2 receptions, 68 yards, 1 TD |

=== Appalachian State ===
Game Two – No. 23 Appalachian State Mountaineers at Marshall Thundering Herd

| Quarter | 1 | 2 | 3 | 4 | Total |
|---|---|---|---|---|---|
| No. 23 Mountaineers | 7 | 0 | 0 | 0 | 7 |
| Thundering Herd | 7 | 3 | 7 | 0 | 17 |

at Joan C. Edwards Stadium • Huntington, West Virginia

- Date: Saturday, September 19, 2020
- Game time: 3:45 p.m. EDT
- Game weather: Clear and Sunny • Temperature: 69 °F (21 °C) • Wind: SSW 8 mph
- Game attendance: 12,050
- Referee: M. Vandervelde
- TV announcers (CBS): Rich Waltz (play-by-play), Aaron Murray (analyst), Sherree Burruss (sideline)

Game information

First quarter

- (12:29) MRSH – Brenden Knox 2 yard rush, Shane Ciucci kick (Drive: 7 plays, 51 yards, 2:31; Marshall 7–0)
- (7:11) APP – Jalen Virgil 11 yard pass from Zac Thomas, Chandler Staton kick (Drive: 11 plays, 85 yards, 5:18; Tied 7–7)

Second quarter

- (2:28) MRSH – Shane Ciucci 29 yard field goal (Drive: 14 plays, 68 yards, 6:08; Marshall 10–7)

Third quarter

- (4:44) MRSH – Grant Wells 12 yard rush, Shane Ciucci kick (Drive: 2 plays, 79 yards, 0:34; Marshall 17–7)

| Statistics | APP | MRSH |
|---|---|---|
| First downs | 26 | 22 |
| Plays–yards | 72–364 | 70–379 |
| Rushes–yards | 33–96 | 45–216 |
| Passing yards | 268 | 163 |
| Passing: comp–att–int | 22–39–1 | 11–25–1 |
| Time of possession | 28:01 | 31:59 |

| Team | Category | Player | Statistics |
|---|---|---|---|
| App State | Passing | Zac Thomas | 22/38, 268 yards, 1 TD, 1 INT |
| App State | Rushing | Camerun Peoples | 12 carries, 57 yards |
| App State | Receiving | Thomas Hennigan | 5 receptions, 88 yards |
| Marshall | Passing | Grant Wells | 11/25, 163 yards, 1 INT |
| Marshall | Rushing | Brenden Knox | 28 carries, 138 yards, 1 TD |
| Marshall | Receiving | Xavier Gaines | 2 receptions, 68 yards |

=== At Western Kentucky ===
Game Three – Marshall Thundering Herd at Western Kentucky Hilltoppers

| Quarter | 1 | 2 | 3 | 4 | Total |
|---|---|---|---|---|---|
| Thundering Herd | 14 | 14 | 10 | 0 | 38 |
| Hilltoppers | 0 | 0 | 7 | 7 | 14 |

at Houchens Industries–L. T. Smith Stadium • Bowling Green, Kentucky

- Date: Saturday, October 10, 2020
- Game time: 7:30 p.m. EDT
- Game weather: Partly Cloudy • Temperature: 68 °F (20 °C) • Wind: E 6 mph
- Game attendance: 4,428
- Referee: Billy Williams
- TV announcers (Stadium): Chris Hassel (play-by-play), A. J. Hawk (analyst)

Game information

First quarter

- (14:22) MRSH – Brenden Knox 45 yard rush, Shane Ciucci kick (Drive: 2 plays, 75 yards, 0:38; Marshall 7–0)
- (2:21) MRSH – Sheldon Evans 5 yard rush, Shane Ciucci kick (Drive: 9 plays, 60 yards, 4:30; Marshall 14–0)

Second quarter

- (2:14) MRSH – Brenden Knox 1 yard rush, Shane Ciucci kick (Drive: 4 plays, 45 yards, 1:49; Marshall 21–0)
- (0:27) MRSH – Brenden Knox 9 yard rush, Shane Ciucci kick (Drive: 7 plays, 37 yards, 1:33; Marshall 28–0)

Third quarter

- (9:20) MRSH – Tavante Beckett 38 yard fumble return, Shane Ciucci kick (Drive: 4 plays, 13 yards, 1:42; Marshall 35–0)
- (2:22) MRSH – Shane Ciucci 28 yard field goal (Drive: 11 plays, 34 yards, 5:20; Marshall 38–0)
- (0:00) WKU – Kevaris Thomas 2 yard rush, Brayden Narveson kick (Drive: 5 plays, 75 yards, 2:22; Marshall 38–7)

Fourth quarter

- (0:06) WKU – Dalvin Smith 26 yard pass from Kevaris Thomas, Brayden Narveson kick (Drive: 11 plays, 80 yards, 1:37; Marshall 38–14)

| Statistics | MRSH | WKU |
|---|---|---|
| First downs | 17 | 15 |
| Plays–yards | 61–344 | 64–294 |
| Rushes–yards | 40–182 | 25–85 |
| Passing yards | 162 | 209 |
| Passing: comp–att–int | 16–22–0 | 21–39–0 |
| Time of possession | 34:41 | 25:19 |

| Team | Category | Player | Statistics |
|---|---|---|---|
| Marshall | Passing | Grant Wells | 16/22, 162 yards |
| Marshall | Rushing | Brenden Knox | 15 carries, 107 yards, 3 TD |
| Marshall | Receiving | Broc Thompson | 4 receptions, 94 yards |
| WKU | Passing | Kevaris Thomas | 9/18, 148 yards, 1 TD |
| WKU | Rushing | Kevaris Thomas | 7 carries, 30 yards, 1 TD |
| WKU | Receiving | Xavier Lane | 4 receptions, 74 yards |

=== At Louisiana Tech ===
Game Four – Marshall Thundering Herd at Louisiana Tech Bulldogs

| Quarter | 1 | 2 | 3 | 4 | Total |
|---|---|---|---|---|---|
| Thundering Herd | 7 | 7 | 14 | 7 | 35 |
| Bulldogs | 0 | 3 | 7 | 7 | 17 |

at Joe Aillet Stadium • Ruston, Louisiana

- Date: Saturday, October 17, 2020
- Game time: 6:02 p.m. EDT
- Game weather: Partly Cloudy • Temperature: 70 °F (21 °C) • Wind: S 10 mph
- Game attendance: 7,140
- Referee: Chris Bynum
- TV announcers (CBSSN): Rich Waltz (play-by-play), Aaron Murray (analyst), AJ Ross (sideline)

Game information

First quarter

- (5:36) MRSH – Grant Wells 1 yard rush, Shane Ciucci kick (Drive: 10 plays, 38 yards, 4:43; Marshall 7–0)

Second quarter

- (10:04) LT – Jacob Barnes 35 yard field (Drive: 12 plays, 64 yards, 5:11; Marshall 7–3)
- (1:57) MRSH – Brenden Knox 1 yard rush, Shane Ciucci kick (Drive: 12 plays, 85 yards, 6:20; Marshall 14–3)

Third quarter

- (7:34) MRSH – Brenden Knox 7 yard rush, Shane Ciucci kick (Drive: 8 plays, 51 yards, 3:56; Marshall 21–3)
- (5:41) LT – Adrian Hardy 12 yard pass from Luke Anthony, Jacob Barnes kick (Drive: 5 plays, 77 yards, 1:53; Marshall 21-10)
- (3:09) MRSH – Artie Henry 46 yard pass from Grant Wells, Shane Ciucci kick (Drive: 5 plays, 75 yards, 2:32; Marshall 28–10)

Fourth quarter

- (11:03) MRSH – Corey Gammage 26 yard pass from Grant Wells, Shane Ciucci kick (Drive: 11 plays, 85 yards, 5:49; Marshall 35–10)
- (0:36) LT – Isaiah Graham 9 yard pass from Aaron Allen, Jacob Barnes kick (Drive: 11 plays, 87 yards, 4:45; Marshall 35–17)

| Statistics | MRSH | LT |
|---|---|---|
| First downs | 25 | 17 |
| Plays–yards | 71–402 | 58–267 |
| Rushes–yards | 47–175 | 24–7 |
| Passing yards | 227 | 260 |
| Passing: comp–att–int | 19–24–1 | 26–34–1 |
| Time of possession | 35:11 | 24:29 |

| Team | Category | Player | Statistics |
|---|---|---|---|
| Marshall | Passing | Grant Wells | 19/24, 227 yards, 2 TD, 1 INT |
| Marshall | Rushing | Brenden Knox | 32 carries, 125 yards, 2 TD |
| Marshall | Receiving | Artie Henry | 3 receptions, 72 yards, 1 TD |
| La Tech | Passing | Luke Anthony | 18/25, 180 yards, 1 TD, 1 INT |
| La Tech | Rushing | Israel Tucker | 4 carries, 20 yards |
| La Tech | Receiving | Adrian Hardy | 9 receptions, 102 yards, 1 TD |

=== Florida Atlantic ===
Game Five – Florida Atlantic Owls at No. 22 Marshall Thundering Herd

| Quarter | 1 | 2 | 3 | 4 | Total |
|---|---|---|---|---|---|
| Owls | 0 | 6 | 3 | 0 | 9 |
| No. 22 Thundering Herd | 7 | 0 | 10 | 3 | 20 |

at Joan C. Edwards Stadium • Huntington, West Virginia

- Date: Saturday, October 24, 2020
- Game time: 2:30 p.m. EDT
- Game weather: Cloudy• Temperature: 52 °F (11 °C) • Wind: S 6 mph
- Game attendance: 12,002
- Referee: Rodney Burnette
- TV announcers (Stadium): Chris Hassel (play-by-play), A. J. Hawk (analyst)

Game information

First quarter

- (5:40) MRSH – Brenden Knox 58 yard pass from Grant Wells, Shane Ciucci kick (Drive: 5 plays, 79 yards, 2:08; Marshall 7–0)

Second quarter

- (2:28) FAU – Malcolm Davidson 11 yard rush, Vladimir Rivas PAT blocked (Drive: 12 plays, 65 yards, 5:53; Marshall 7–6)

Third quarter

- (8:12) FAU – Vladimir Rivas 43 yard field goal (Drive: 11 plays, 52 yards, 6:48; FAU 9–7)
- (6:24) MRSH – Artie Henry 41 yard pass from Grant Wells, Shane Ciucci kick (Drive: 4 plays, 81 yards, 1:48; Marshall 14–9)
- (3:13) MRSH – Shane Ciucci 35 yard field goal (Drive: 7 plays, 29 yards, 2:25; Marshall 17–9)

Fourth quarter

- (10:53) MRSH – Shane Ciucci 22 yard field goal (Drive: 9 plays, 60 yards, 4:20; Marshall 20–9)

| Statistics | FAU | MRSH |
|---|---|---|
| First downs | 17 | 19 |
| Plays–yards | 68–234 | 64–385 |
| Rushes–yards | 37–86 | 30–134 |
| Passing yards | 148 | 251 |
| Passing: comp–att–int | 18–30–1 | 18–31–2 |
| Time of possession | 33:12 | 26:48 |

| Team | Category | Player | Statistics |
|---|---|---|---|
| FAU | Passing | Nick Tronti | 18/30, 148 yards, 1 INT |
| FAU | Rushing | Malcolm Davidson | 8 carries, 62 yards, 1 TD |
| FAU | Receiving | Jordan Merrell | 5 receptions, 48 yards |
| Marshall | Passing | Grant Wells | 18/31, 251 yards, 2 TD, 2 INT |
| Marshall | Rushing | Brenden Knox | 25 carries, 101 yards |
| Marshall | Receiving | Corey Gammage | 6 receptions, 79 yards |

=== UMass ===
Game Six – UMass Minutemen at No. 16 Marshall Thundering Herd

| Quarter | 1 | 2 | 3 | 4 | Total |
|---|---|---|---|---|---|
| Minutemen | 7 | 3 | 0 | 0 | 10 |
| No. 16 Thundering Herd | 14 | 17 | 13 | 7 | 51 |

at Joan C. Edwards Stadium • Huntington, West Virginia

- Date: Saturday, November 7, 2020
- Game time: 2:35 p.m. EST
- Game weather: Clear and Sunny• Temperature: 74 °F (23 °C) • Wind: Calm
- Game attendance: 11,711
- Referee: Rodney Burnette
- TV announcers (ESPN+): Mark Martin (play-by-play), Jake Griffith (analyst)

Game information

First quarter

- (13:28) MRSH – Brenden Knox 45 yard rush, Shane Ciucci kick (Drive: 4 plays, 75 yards, 1:32; Marshall 7–0)
- (7:01) MASS – Samuel Emilus 2 yard pass from Will Koch, Jeremy Martin kick (Drive: 6 plays, 80 yards, 2:48; Tied 7–7)
- (2:02) MRSH – Brenden Knox 14 yard rush, Shane Ciucci kick (Drive: 11 plays, 82 yards, 4:59; Marshall 14–7)

Second quarter

- (9:52) MRSH – Corey Gammage 19 yard pass from Grant Wells, Shane Ciucci kick (Drive: 8 plays, 49 yards, 3:00; Marshall 21–7)
- (6:04) MRSH – Shane Ciucci 43 yard field goal (Drive: 5 plays, 17 yards, 2:13; Marshall 24–7)
- (2:38) MASS – Jeremy Martin 46 yard field goal (Drive: 8 plays, 46 yards, 3:26; Marshall 24–10)
- (0:38) MRSH – Sheldon Evans 11 yard rush, Shane Ciucci kick (Drive: 6 plays, 74 yards, 2:00; Marshall 31–10)

Third quarter

- (6:47) MRSH – Xavier Gaines 13 yard pass from Grant Wells, Shane Ciucci rush failed (Drive: 11 plays, 80 yards, 5:12; Marshall 37–10)
- (3:46) MRSH – Xavier Gaines 16 yard pass from Grant Wells, Shane Ciucci kick (Drive: 2 plays, 16 yards, 0:44; Marshall 44–10)

Fourth quarter

- (13:04) MRSH – Knowledge McDaniel 14 yard rush, Shane Ciucci kick (Drive: 5 plays, 61 yards, 2:37; Marshall 51–10)

| Statistics | MASS | MRSH |
|---|---|---|
| First downs | 12 | 33 |
| Plays–yards | 55–190 | 73–495 |
| Rushes–yards | 29–41 | 41–267 |
| Passing yards | 149 | 228 |
| Passing: comp–att–int | 17–26–0 | 21–32–0 |
| Time of possession | 26:53 | 33:07 |

| Team | Category | Player | Statistics |
|---|---|---|---|
| UMass | Passing | Will Koch | 12/18, 99 yards, 1 TD |
| UMass | Rushing | Ellis Merriweather | 10 carries, 31 yards |
| UMass | Receiving | Taylor Edwards | 1 reception, 37 yards |
| Marshall | Passing | Grant Wells | 21/30, 228 yards, 3 TD |
| Marshall | Rushing | Brenden Knox | 14 carries, 118 yards, 2 TD |
| Marshall | Receiving | Artie Henry | 5 receptions, 71 yards |

=== Middle Tennessee ===
Game Seven – Middle Tennessee Blue Raiders at No. 16 Marshall Thundering Herd

| Quarter | 1 | 2 | 3 | 4 | Total |
|---|---|---|---|---|---|
| Blue Raiders | 0 | 7 | 7 | 0 | 14 |
| No. 16 Thundering Herd | 7 | 14 | 21 | 0 | 42 |

at Joan C. Edwards Stadium • Huntington, West Virginia

- Date: Saturday, November 14, 2020
- Game time: 12:06 p.m. EST
- Game weather: Sunny • Temperature: 48 °F (9 °C) • Wind: WSW 3 mph
- Game attendance: 12,224
- Referee: Joe Lehring
- TV announcers (CBSSN): Carter Blackburn (play-by-play), Aaron Murray (analyst), Jenny Dell (sideline)

Game information

First quarter

- (7:18) MRSH – Willie Johnson 3 yard pass from Grant Wells, Shane Ciucci kick (Drive: 2 plays, 7 yards, 0:44; Marshall 7–0)

Second quarter

- (10:29) MTSU – Jarrin Pierce 4 yard pass from Asher O'Hara, Crews Holt kick (Drive: 11 plays, 73 yards, 2:53; Tied 7–7)
- (3:08) MRSH – Hayden Hagler 1 yard pass from Grant Wells, Shane Ciucci kick (Drive: 6 plays, 60 yards, 2:25; Marshall 14–7)
- (0:32) MRSH – Corey Gammmage 17 yard pass from Grant Wells, Shane Ciucci kick (Drive: 4 plays, 47 yards, 1:00; Marshall 21–7)

Third quarter

- (11:32) MRSH – Corey Gammmage 28 yard pass from Grant Wells, Shane Ciucci kick (Drive: 4 plays, 92 yards, 1:34; Marshall 28–7)
- (6:51) MTSU – Asher O'Hara 2 yard rush, Crews Holt kick (Drive: 3 plays, 28 yards, 1:02; Marshall 28–14)
- (5:40) MRSH – Sheldon Evans 26 yard rush, Shane Ciucci kick (Drive: 3 plays, 65 yards, 1:11; Marshall 35–14)
- (7:18) MRSH – Willie Johnson 23 yard pass from Grant Wells, Shane Ciucci kick (Drive: 3 plays, 55 yards, 1:09; Marshall 42–14)

| Statistics | MTSU | MRSH |
|---|---|---|
| First downs | 18 | 26 |
| Plays–yards | 68–303 | 75–520 |
| Rushes–yards | 23–56 | 38–184 |
| Passing yards | 247 | 336 |
| Passing: comp–att–int | 30–45–0 | 25–37–0 |
| Time of possession | 24:46 | 35:14 |

| Team | Category | Player | Statistics |
|---|---|---|---|
| Middle Tennessee | Passing | Asher O'Hara | 29/44, 241 yards, 1 TD |
| Middle Tennessee | Rushing | Asher O'Hara | 11 carries, 39 yards, 1 TD |
| Middle Tennessee | Receiving | Jarrin Pierce | 9 receptions, 90 yards, 1 TD |
| Marshall | Passing | Grant Wells | 25/37, 336 yards, 5 TD |
| Marshall | Rushing | Brenden Knox | 16 carries, 70 yards |
| Marshall | Receiving | Willie Johnson | 8 receptions, 137 yards, 2 TD |

=== Rice ===
Game Eight – Rice Owls at No. 21 Marshall Thundering Herd

| Quarter | 1 | 2 | 3 | 4 | Total |
|---|---|---|---|---|---|
| Owls | 7 | 3 | 10 | 0 | 20 |
| No. 21 Thundering Herd | 0 | 0 | 0 | 0 | 0 |

at Joan C. Edwards Stadium • Huntington, West Virginia

- Date: Saturday, December 5, 2020
- Game time: 12:05 p.m. EST
- Game weather: Cloudy • Temperature: 43 °F (6 °C) • Wind: WNW 6 mph
- Game attendance: 10,429
- Referee: Ken Antee
- TV announcers (ESPN+): Jake Griffith (play–by–play) and Dave Wilson (analyst)

Game information

First quarter

- (1:06) RICE – Jordan Myers 1 yard rush, Collin Riccitelli kick (Drive: 10 plays, 47 yards, 6:48; Rice 7–0)

Second quarter

- (5:49) RICE – Collin Riccitelli 39 yard field goal (Drive: 10 plays, 66 yards, 5:21; Rice 10–0)

Third quarter

- (9:24) RICE – Collin Riccitelli 40 yard field goal (Drive: 4 plays, 5 yards, 2:21; Rice 13–0)
- (7:50) RICE – Naeem Smith 36 yard interception return, Collin Riccitelli kick (Drive: 3 plays, -5 yards, 1:34; Rice 20–0)

| Statistics | RICE | MRSH |
|---|---|---|
| First downs | 17 | 19 |
| Plays–yards | 63–213 | 63–245 |
| Rushes–yards | 46–127 | 28–80 |
| Passing yards | 86 | 165 |
| Passing: comp–att–int | 10–14–0 | 18–35–5 |
| Time of possession | 36:26 | 23:34 |

| Team | Category | Player | Statistics |
|---|---|---|---|
| Rice | Passing | JoVoni Johnson | 10/14, 86 yards |
| Rice | Rushing | Ari Broussard | 19 carries, 62 yards |
| Rice | Receiving | Jake Bailey | 7 receptions, 57 yards |
| Marshall | Passing | Grant Wells | 18/35, 165 yards, 5 INT |
| Marshall | Rushing | Brenden Knox | 20 carries, 76 yards |
| Marshall | Receiving | Talik Keaton | 7 receptions, 48 yards |

=== UAB (Conference USA Championship) ===
Game Nine – UAB Blazers at Marshall Thundering Herd (Conference USA Championship)

| Quarter | 1 | 2 | 3 | 4 | Total |
|---|---|---|---|---|---|
| Blazers | 3 | 6 | 0 | 13 | 22 |
| Thundering Herd | 0 | 0 | 7 | 6 | 13 |

at Joan C. Edwards Stadium • Huntington, West Virginia

- Date: Saturday, December 18, 2020
- Game time: 7:00 p.m. EST
- Game weather: Cloudy • Temperature: 34 °F (1 °C) • Wind: W 3 MPH
- Game attendance: 8,324
- Referee: Jon Noli
- TV announcers (CBSSN): Rich Waltz (play-by-play), Aaron Taylor (analyst) and Jenny Dell (sideline)

Game information

First quarter

- (1:45) UAB – Matt Quinn 30-yard field goal (Drive: 11 plays, 64 yards, 6:10; UAB 3–0)

Second quarter

- (11:55) UAB – Hayden Pittman 19-yard pass from Tyler Johnston III, Matt Quinn kick failed (Drive: 6 plays, 80 yards, 2:54; UAB 9–0)

Third quarter

- (6:17) MRSH – Artie Henry 7-yard pass from Grant Wells, Shane Ciucci kick (Drive: 6 plays, 49 yards, 2:06; UAB 9–7)

Fourth quarter

- (14:55) UAB – Matt Quinn 42-yard field goal (Drive: 10 plays, 50 yards, 6:22; UAB 12–7)
- (5:55) UAB – Matt Quinn 48-yard field goal (Drive: 12 plays, 40 yards, 6:47; UAB 15–7)
- (5:38) MRSH – Xavier Gaines 70-yard pass from Grant Wells, Grant Wells pass failed (Drive: 1 play, 70 yards, 0:17; UAB 15–13)
- (4:02) UAB – Trea Shropshire 71-yard pass from T Johnston III, Matt Quinn kick (Drive: 3 plays, 75 yards, 1:36; UAB 22–13)

| Statistics | UAB | MRSH |
|---|---|---|
| First downs | 21 | 10 |
| Plays–yards | 74–468 | 51–268 |
| Rushes–yards | 52–216 | 27–130 |
| Passing yards | 252 | 138 |
| Passing: comp–att–int | 12–22–0 | 8–24–1 |
| Time of possession | 41:26 | 18:34 |

| Team | Category | Player | Statistics |
|---|---|---|---|
| UAB | Passing | Tyler Johnston III | 12/22, 252 yards, 2 TD |
| UAB | Rushing | Spencer Brown | 30 carries, 149 yards |
| UAB | Receiving | Trea Shropshire | 5 receptions, 180 yards, TD |
| Marshall | Passing | Grant Wells | 8/23, 138 yards, 2 TD |
| Marshall | Rushing | Brenden Knox | 17 carries, 67 yards |
| Marshall | Receiving | Xavier Gaines | 1 reception, 70 yards, TD |

=== Buffalo (Camellia Bowl) ===
Game Ten – Marshall Thundering Herd vs. Buffalo Bulls (2020 Camellia Bowl)

| Quarter | 1 | 2 | 3 | 4 | Total |
|---|---|---|---|---|---|
| Thundering Herd | 0 | 7 | 3 | 0 | 10 |
| Bulls | 0 | 10 | 0 | 7 | 17 |

at Cramton Bowl • Montgomery, Alabama

- Date: Saturday, December 25, 2020
- Game time: 2:30 p.m. EST
- Game weather: Sunny • Temperature: 41 °F (5 °C) • Wind: W 13 mph
- Game attendance: 2,512
- Referee: Edwin Lee (The American)
- TV announcers (ESPN): Bill Roth (play-by-play), Dustin Fox (analyst) and Lauren Sisler (sideline)
- ESPN game summary

Game information

First quarter
No scoring plays
Second quarter

- (11:43) UB – Kyle Vantrease 1 yard rush, Alex McNulty kick (Drive: 11 plays, 80 yards, 5:31; Buffalo 7–0)
- (5:33) UB – Alex McNulty 25 yard field goal (Drive: 10 plays, 37 yards, 4:20; Buffalo 10–0)
- (0:42) MRSH – Knowledge McDaniel 2 yard rush, Shane Ciucci kick (Drive: 12 plays, 75 yards, 4:51; Buffalo 10–7)

Third quarter

- (8:48) MRSH – Shane Ciucci 21 yard field goal (Drive: 15 plays, 60 yards, 6:12; Tied 10–10)

Fourth quarter

- (1:09) UB – Kevin Marks 2 yard rush, Alex McNulty kick (Drive: 13 plays, 88 yards, 6:18; Buffalo 17–10)

| Statistics | MRSH | UB |
|---|---|---|
| First downs | 16 | 21 |
| Plays–yards | 59–248 | 70–295 |
| Rushes–yards | 37–134 | 43–155 |
| Passing yards | 114 | 140 |
| Passing: comp–att–int | 13–22–0 | 16–27–1 |
| Time of possession | 24:33 | 35:27 |

| Team | Category | Player | Statistics |
|---|---|---|---|
| Marshall | Passing | Grant Wells | 13/20, 114 yards |
| Marshall | Rushing | Sheldon Evans | 18 carries, 79 yards |
| Marshall | Receiving | Corey Gammage | 6 receptions, 88 yards |
| Buffalo | Passing | Kyle Vantrease | 16/27, 140 yards, 1 INT |
| Buffalo | Rushing | Kevin Marks | 35 carries, 138 yards, 1 TD |
| Buffalo | Receiving | Jovany Ruiz | 7 receptions, 61 yards |

== Rankings ==
Ranking movements Legend: ██ Increase in ranking ██ Decrease in ranking — = Not ranked RV = Received votes т = Tied with team above or below
| | Week | | | | | | | | | | | | | | | | | |
| Poll | Pre | 1 | 2 | 3 | 4 | 5 | 6 | 7 | 8 | 9 | 10 | 11 | 12 | 13 | 14 | 15 | 16 | Final |
|---|---|---|---|---|---|---|---|---|---|---|---|---|---|---|---|---|---|---|
| AP | — | —* | RV | 25 | RV | RV | RV | 22 | 19 | 16 | 16 | 15 T | 17 | 15 | RV | RV | RV | RV |
| Coaches | — | —* | RV | RV | RV | RV | RV | 25 | 18 | 15 | 15 | 15 | 16 | 15 | RV | RV | RV | RV |
| CFP | Not released | | | | | | | | | | | | 21 | 21 | —* | | | Not released |

== Players drafted into the NFL ==
| Round | Pick | Player | Position | NFL Club |
|---|---|---|---|---|
| 4 | 138 | Josh Ball | OT | Dallas Cowboys |
