= Pete Alamar =

American football coach (born 1960)

Current position
- Title: Special teams coordinator
- Team: UCF
- Conference: Big 12

Biographical details
- Born: September 28, 1960 (age 66); Phoenix, Arizona, U.S.

Playing career
- 1978–1979: Western Oregon
- 1981–1982: Cal Lutheran
- Position: Offensive lineman

Coaching career (HC unless noted)
- 1983: Cal Poly (GA)
- 1984: Louisiana–Lafayette (GA)
- 1985–1986: Cal Lutheran (OL)
- 1987–1988: Cal Poly (RB/HB)
- 1991–1992: James Madison (TE/def. asst.)
- 1993: Arizona (GA)
- 1994: UANL
- 1995: Arizona (TE/asst. ST)
- 1996: Arizona (ST/TE)
- 1997: Arizona (ST/LB)
- 1998–1999: Arizona (co-ST/TE)
- 2000: Eastern Michigan (OC/OL)
- 2001–2002: Eastern Michigan (OC/TE)
- 2003–2009: California (ST/TE)
- 2010–2011: Fresno State (ST/TE)
- 2012–2022: Stanford (ST/TE)
- 2023–2024: Rice (AHC/ST)
- 2024: Rice (interim HC)
- 2025–present: UCF (ST)

Head coaching record
- Overall: 2–2 (NCAA); 4–6 (ONEFA)

Accomplishments and honors

Awards
- Phil Steele Special Teams Coach of the Year (2013)

Pete Alamar (born September 28, 1960) is an American college football coach currently serving as the special teams coordinator for the UCF Knights. He was most recently the interim head football coach for Rice University during the 2024 season for the team's last four games. He was the head football coach for the Autonomous University of Nuevo León in 1994. He played college football for Western Oregon and Cal Lutheran as an offensive lineman.

== Career ==
Alamar was born on September 28, 1960, in Phoenix, Arizona, and grew up in Thousand Oaks, California. He was an offensive lineman at Thousand Oaks High School and honorable mention for the Marmonte League all-star team in 1977. He first attended Western Oregon University in Monmouth, Oregon, before returning to Thousand Oaks to attend California Lutheran University.

=== Early career ===
He also coached for Cal Poly, Louisiana–Lafayette, Cal Lutheran, James Madison, and Eastern Michigan.

Alamar coached several NFL players at these schools which included offensive lineman Carson Dach (Eastern Michigan) and Andy Dickerson (Cal-Lutheran), as well as outside linebacker Dion Foxx (JMU) and H-back Sal Cesario at (Cal-Poly)

=== Arizona ===
He coached several players to the NFL including: Steve McLaughlin (3rd round 1995 NFL draft), Jimmy Sprotte (7th round 1997 NFL draft), Chester Burnett (7th round 1998 NFL draft), Brandon Manumaleuna (4th round 2001 NFL draft), and Mike Lucky. During his time at Arizona they claimed a Pac-10 championship and 1994 Fiesta Bowl victory.

=== California ===
He coached DeSean Jackson, who lead the country in return yardage in 2006. Jackson went on to win the inaugural Randy Moss Award for best return specialist.

In its 2007 issue, Sporting News ranked California's special teams as the best in the Pac-10. In 2008, Alamar coached punter Bryan Anger, who was a Ray Guy Award finalist after receiving first-team freshman All-America and second-team all-conference honors. Byron Storer was 3x All-conference team (2004-2006) as a special teams specialist and would later play in the NFL.

Tight ends Craig Stevens (3rd round 2008 NFL draft) and Cameron Morrah (7th round 2009 NFL draft) were drafted and played in the NFL.

=== Fresno State ===
Alamar worked extensively with Fresno State punt returner Devon Wylie, who was named All-America by Yahoo (third team), Phil Steele (fourth team), and Sports Illustrated (honorable mention) in 2011. Isaiah Burse, a sophomore, set NCAA FBS single-season marks for the most kickoff returns (75), returns per game (5.8), kickoff return yardage (1,606), and yards returned/game (123.5). Tight end Marcel Jensen was named all conference and went on to the NFL.

=== Stanford ===
Stanford's specialists delivered big in 2015, helping the Cardinal win their third Pac-12 title in four years and defeat Iowa in the Rose Bowl. Christian McCaffrey, would go onto win the Jet Award and Paul Hornung Award as the nation's best kick returner.

In 2012, tight end Zach Ertz earned the Ozzie Newsome Award, was named a Unanimous All-American (2012), and was selected 35th overall in the NFL draft. Tight end Levine Toilolo would also go on to the NFL, being selected in the 4th round of the 2013 NFL draft.

In 2017, Stanford was ranked ninth nationally in kickoff returns (25.11) and 12th in net punting (41.04). Cameron Scarlett topped the country in kickoff returns with 1,008 yards and 12 returns of 30 yards or more.

Stanford's special teams were considered some of the best in the Pac-12 (2018-2020), led by punter Jake Bailey and kicker Jet Toner. Bailey, who was selected by the New England Patriots in the fifth round of the 2019 NFL draft, concluded his Stanford career with the highest punting average (43.81). Toner led the league and ranked second in the nation in field goal percentage. Both specialists earned second-team All-Pac-12 recognition.

In 2022, kicker Joshua Karty was a nominee for the Lou Groza Award for 2022 after going 18-for-18 on field goals, 13 of which were from 40 yards or more, three from 50 yards or more, and a school record 61 yarder. Long snapper Bailey Parsons was All-Pac-12 honors and received the Phil Moffatt Award.

He coached several NFL tight ends including: Austin Hooper (3rd round 2016 NFL draft), Dalton Schultz (4th round 2018 NFL draft), Kaden Smith (6th round 2019 NFL draft), Tucker Fisk, and Colby Parkinson (4th round 2020 NFL draft).

== Head coaching record ==
=== NCAA ===
Year	Team	Overall	Conference	Standing	Bowl/playoffs
Rice Owls (American Athletic Conference) (2024)
2024	Rice	2–2 (Note: Alamar became interim head coach after Mike Bloomgren's firing following week 8.)	2–2	T–9th	
Rice:		2–2	2–2		
Total:		2–2			
