= 2020 Rice Owls football team =

American college football season

2020 Rice Owls football
- Conference: Conference USA
- West Division
- Record: 2–3 (2–3 C-USA)
- Head coach: Mike Bloomgren (3rd season)
- Offensive coordinator: Jerry Mack (3rd season)
- Offensive scheme: Multiple
- Defensive coordinator: Brian Smith (3rd season)
- Base defense: Multiple 3–4
- Home stadium: Rice Stadium

2020 Conference USA football standings
| | Conf. | | | Overall |
| Team | W | | L | W | | L |
|---|---|---|---|---|---|---|
East Division
| Marshall xy | 4 | – | 1 | 7 | – | 3 |
| Florida Atlantic | 4 | – | 2 | 5 | – | 4 |
| Western Kentucky | 4 | – | 3 | 5 | – | 7 |
| Charlotte | 2 | – | 2 | 2 | – | 4 |
| Middle Tennessee | 2 | – | 4 | 3 | – | 6 |
| FIU | 0 | – | 3 | 0 | – | 5 |
West Division
| UAB xy$ | 3 | – | 1 | 6 | – | 3 |
| UTSA | 5 | – | 2 | 7 | – | 5 |
| Louisiana Tech | 4 | – | 2 | 5 | – | 5 |
| North Texas | 3 | – | 4 | 4 | – | 6 |
| Rice | 2 | – | 3 | 2 | – | 3 |
| Southern Miss | 2 | – | 4 | 3 | – | 7 |
| UTEP | 0 | – | 4 | 3 | – | 5 |
Championship: UAB 22, Marshall 13
$ – Conference champion; x – Division champion/co-champions; y – Championship game participant; Note: Due to COVID-19, Old Dominion opted out of the season.

The 2020 Rice Owls football team represented Rice University in the 2020 NCAA Division I FBS football season. The Owls played their home games at Rice Stadium in Houston, Texas, and competed in the West Division of Conference USA (C–USA). They were led by third-year head coach Mike Bloomgren.

== Preseason ==
=== Award watch lists ===
Listed in the order that they were released

| Award | Player | Position | Year |
|---|---|---|---|
| Chuck Bednarik Award | Blaze Alldredge | LB | SR |
| Fred Biletnikoff Award | Bradley Rozner | WR | RS JR |
| Butkus Award | Blaze Alldredge | LB | SR |
| Bronko Nagurski Trophy | Blaze Alldredge | LB | SR |
| Paul Hornung Award | Austin Trammell | WR | SR |

=== Preseason All–C-USA teams ===
The Preseason team will be released during the Virtual Media Day to be held in the summer of 2020.

=== Recruiting class ===
College recruiting information
| Name | Hometown | School | Height | Weight | 40^{‡} | Commit date |
|---|---|---|---|---|---|---|
| Jaren Banks; Linebacker | Junction City, OR | Sheldon HS; New Mexico Military | 6 ft 0 in (1.83 m) | 210 lb (95 kg) | – | Feb 6, 2020 |
| Jaren Banks; Linebacker | Recruit ratings: Scout: Rivals: 247Sports: ESPN: | | | | | |
| Kobie Campbel; Running Back | Missouri City, TX | Hightower HS | 5 ft 7 in (1.70 m) | 165 lb (75 kg) | – | Dec 18, 2019 |
| Kobie Campbel; Running Back | Recruit ratings: Scout: Rivals: 247Sports: ESPN: | | | | | |
| Michael "Mike" Collins; Quarterback | New Canaan, CT | New Canaan HS; TCU | 6 ft 5 in (1.96 m) | 225 lb (102 kg) | – | Dec 18, 2019 |
| Michael "Mike" Collins; Quarterback | Recruit ratings: Scout: Rivals: 247Sports: ESPN: | | | | | |
| Jordan Dunbar; Cornerback | Tarrytown, NY | Iona Prep | 5 ft 11 in (1.80 m) | 180 lb (82 kg) | – | Dec 18, 2019 |
| Jordan Dunbar; Cornerback | Recruit ratings: Scout: Rivals: 247Sports: ESPN: | | | | | |
| Sean Fresch; Athlete | Austin, TX | Lyndon B. Johnson HS | 5 ft 8 in (1.73 m) | 170 lb (77 kg) | – | Dec 18, 2019 |
| Sean Fresch; Athlete | Recruit ratings: Scout: Rivals: 247Sports: ESPN: | | | | | |
| Khalan Griffin; Running Back | Tyler, TX | Chapel Hill HS | 5 ft 10 in (1.78 m) | 200 lb (91 kg) | – | Dec 18, 2019 |
| Khalan Griffin; Running Back | Recruit ratings: Scout: Rivals: 247Sports: ESPN: | | | | | |
| Geron Hargon; Linebacker | Shreveport, LA | Captain Shreve HS | 6 ft 2 in (1.88 m) | 220 lb (100 kg) | – | Dec 18, 2019 |
| Geron Hargon; Linebacker | Recruit ratings: Scout: Rivals: 247Sports: ESPN: | | | | | |
| Nate Kamper; Tight End | Fort Hood, TX | Killeen HS | 6 ft 6 in (1.98 m) | 210 lb (95 kg) | – | Dec 18, 2019 |
| Nate Kamper; Tight End | Recruit ratings: Scout: Rivals: 247Sports: ESPN: | | | | | |
| Cole Latos; Defensive Lineman | Allen, TX | Allen HS | 6 ft 5 in (1.96 m) | 270 lb (120 kg) | – | Dec 18, 2019 |
| Cole Latos; Defensive Lineman | Recruit ratings: Scout: Rivals: 247Sports: ESPN: | | | | | |
| Mike Leone; Offensive Lineman | Bryn Mawr, PA | The Hun School | 6 ft 5 in (1.96 m) | 270 lb (120 kg) | – | Dec 18, 2019 |
| Mike Leone; Offensive Lineman | Recruit ratings: Scout: Rivals: 247Sports: ESPN: | | | | | |
| Andrew Mason; Wide Receiver | Spring Hill, TN | Ravenwood HS | 5 ft 10 in (1.78 m) | 155 lb (70 kg) | – | Dec 18, 2019 |
| Andrew Mason; Wide Receiver | Recruit ratings: Scout: Rivals: 247Sports: ESPN: | | | | | |
| TJ McMahon; Quarterback | Anaheim, CA | Servite HS; Cerritos College | 6 ft 0 in (1.83 m) | 195 lb (88 kg) | – | Dec 18, 2019 |
| TJ McMahon; Quarterback | Recruit ratings: Scout: Rivals: 247Sports: ESPN: | | | | | |
| Lamont Narcisse; Cornerback | Pasadena, CA | Calabasas HS | 5 ft 11 in (1.80 m) | 176 lb (80 kg) | – | Feb 6, 2020 |
| Lamont Narcisse; Cornerback | Recruit ratings: Scout: Rivals: 247Sports: ESPN: | | | | | |
| Braedon Nutter; Offensive Lineman | Tomball, TX | Tomball Memorial HS | 6 ft 3 in (1.91 m) | 290 lb (130 kg) | – | Dec 18, 2019 |
| Braedon Nutter; Offensive Lineman | Recruit ratings: Scout: Rivals: 247Sports: ESPN: | | | | | |
| Trey Phillippi; Offensive Tackle | Montgomery, TX | Montgomery HS | 6 ft 5 in (1.96 m) | 260 lb (120 kg) | – | Dec 18, 2019 |
| Trey Phillippi; Offensive Tackle | Recruit ratings: Scout: Rivals: 247Sports: ESPN: | | | | | |
| Jalen Reeves; Defensive Lineman | Hollywood, FL | NSU University School | 6 ft 0 in (1.83 m) | 210 lb (95 kg) | – | Dec 18, 2019 |
| Jalen Reeves; Defensive Lineman | Recruit ratings: Scout: Rivals: 247Sports: ESPN: | | | | | |
| Collin Riccitelli; Kicker | San Marcos, CA | Carlsbad HS; Stanford | 6 ft 0 in (1.83 m) | 198 lb (90 kg) | – | Feb 6, 2020 |
| Collin Riccitelli; Kicker | Recruit ratings: Scout: Rivals: 247Sports: ESPN: | | | | | |
| Adam Sheriff; Offensive Lineman | Prosper, TX | Prosper HS; Butler CC | 6 ft 4 in (1.93 m) | 285 lb (129 kg) | – | Dec 18, 2019 |
| Adam Sheriff; Offensive Lineman | Recruit ratings: Scout: Rivals: 247Sports: ESPN: | | | | | |
| Gabriel "Gabe" Taylor; Defensive Back | Miami, FL | Gulliver Prep | 5 ft 9 in (1.75 m) | 180 lb (82 kg) | – | Feb 6, 2020 |
| Gabriel "Gabe" Taylor; Defensive Back | Recruit ratings: Scout: Rivals: 247Sports: ESPN: | | | | | |
| Jovaun Woolford; Offensive Lineman | Des Plaines, IL | Maine West HS; Colgate | 6 ft 5 in (1.96 m) | 285 lb (129 kg) | – | Dec 18, 2019 |
| Jovaun Woolford; Offensive Lineman | Recruit ratings: Scout: Rivals: 247Sports: ESPN: | | | | | |
| Plae Wyatt; Safety | McKinney, TX | Boyd HS | 5 ft 11 in (1.80 m) | 200 lb (91 kg) | – | Dec 18, 2019 |
| Plae Wyatt; Safety | Recruit ratings: Scout: Rivals: 247Sports: ESPN: | | | | | |

== Personnel ==
2020 Rice Owls football team roster
Players
Coaches
Offense

| Pos. | # | Name | Class |
|---|---|---|---|
| WR | 1 | Cameron Montgomery | Jr |
| WR | 2 | Bradley Rozner | Jr |
| QB | 3 | Jovoni Johnson | Fr |
| QB | 4 | Mike Collins | Sr |
| QB | 5 | Wiley Green | So |
| TE | 7 | Jordan Myers | Sr |
| RB | 8 | Juma Otoviano | So |
| QB | 9 | TJ McMahon | So |
| WR | 10 | Austin Trammell | Sr |
| WR | 11 | Jake Bailey | So |
| WR | 12 | Austin Conrad | Jr |
| WR | 13 | Zane Knipe | Fr |
| WR | 15 | Chris Boudreaux | Jr |
| QB | 16 | Robbie Blosser | Jr |
| QB | 17 | Parker Towns | So |
| TE | 18 | Robert French | So |
| QB | 19 | Evan Marshman | Jr |
| RB | 22 | Jawan King | Fr |
| RB | 27 | Ayden Noriega | Fr |
| RB | 30 | Ari Broussard | So |
| FB | 32 | Jerry Johnson III | Fr |
| FB | 35 | Luke Amrstrong | So |
| WR | 38 | Jashon Palmer | Fr |
| OL | 50 | Izeya Floyd | Fr |
| OL | 54 | Isaac Klarkowski | Fr |
| OL | 58 | Shea Baker | Jr |
| OT | 63 | Brandt Pederson | Jr |
| OL | 67 | Connor Hughes | Fr |
| OL | 70 | Jovaun Woolford | Sr |
| OL | 71 | Clay Servin | So |
| OL | 73 | Cole Garcia | So |
| OT | 74 | Nick Wagman | Fr |
| OL | 75 | Derek Ferraro | So |
| OL | 77 | Adam Sheriff | So |
| G | 79 | Regan Riddle | Fr |
| TE | 80 | Jonathan Sanchez | Jr |
| TE | 82 | Jaeger Bull | Jr |
| WR | 84 | Bennett Mecom | Fr |
| FB | 85 | Brendan Suckley | So |
| TE | 87 | Jack Bradley | So |
| WR | 88 | August Pitre III | So |

Defense

| Pos. | # | Name | Class |
|---|---|---|---|
| LB | 1 | Antonio Montero | Jr |
| DE | 2 | Javante Hubbard | Sr |
| S | 3 | Naeem Smith | Sr |
| DB | 4 | Prudy Calderon | Jr |
| S | 5 | Chike Anigbogu | Fr |
| LB | 6 | Blaze Alldredge | Sr |
| DE | 7 | Trey Schuman | Jr |
| LB | 8 | Kebreyun Page | So |
| S | 9 | Kirk Lockhart | So |
| DE | 10 | Kenneth Orji | Jr |
| DE | 11 | Cameron Valentine | So |
| OLB, DE | 12 | Josh Pearcy | Fr |
| CB | 15 | Andrew Bird | So |
| LB | 17 | TreShawn Chamberlain | Jr |
| DB | 18 | Tyrae Thornton | Jr |
| CB | 19 | Tre'Shon Devones | So |
| DB | 20 | George Nyakwol | Sr |
| OLB | 21 | Garrett Braden | Fr |
| CB | 22 | Jason White | So |
| DB | 23 | Isaiah Richardson | Jr |
| CB | 24 | Miles McCord | Jr |
| CB | 24 | Collin Whitaker | Sr |
| DB | 31 | Matthew Sams | So |
| LB | 33 | Myron Morrison | Fr |
| S | 37 | Jacob Grams | Jr |
| LB, LS | 46 | Garrett Grammer | Sr |
| DE | 48 | Jacob Doddridge | So |
| DL | 50 | Hunter Hanley | Fr |
| DL | 51 | Will Martinez | Fr |
| DT | 55 | De'Braylon Carroll | So |
| DE | 89 | Miles Adams | So |
| DL | 91 | Ikenna Enechukwu | So |
| DL | 92 | Elijah Garcia | Sr |
| DL | 97 | Adrian Bickham | So |

Special teams

| Pos. | # | Name | Class |
|---|---|---|---|
| K | 25 | Will Harrison | Jr |
| LS | 34 | Campbell Riddle | Jr |
| K, P | 76 | Nicholas McQuarry | So |
| P | 91 | Charlie Mendes | Fr |

Head coach

- Mike Bloomgren (Florida State)

Coordinators/assistant coaches

- Jerry Mack (Delta State)
  Offensive coordinator/qb
- Brian Smith (UMass)
  Defensive coordinator/s
- Drew Svoboda (Stephen F. Austin)
  Special teams coordinator
- Sanders Davis (Dartmouth)
  Offensive line
- Chris Monfiletto (Ohio)
  Tight ends
- Cedric Calhoun (Morehouse College)
  Defensive line
- Mike Kershaw (Delta State)
  Wide receivers
- Robbie Picazo (Stanford)
  Running backs
- Scott Vestal (SMU)
  Recruiting coordinator/lb
- Gerard Wilcher (Morehouse College)
  Cornerbacks

Legend

- (C) Team captain
- (S) Suspended
- (I) Ineligible
- Injured
- Redshirt

Roster
Last update: 27 May 2020

== Schedule ==
Rice had games scheduled against Lamar, Louisiana Tech, LSU, UTEP, and UTSA which were canceled due to the COVID-19 pandemic.

| Date | Time | Opponent | Site | TV | Result | Attendance |
|---|---|---|---|---|---|---|
| October 24 | 2:30 p.m. | Middle Tennessee | Rice Stadium; Houston, TX | ESPN3 | L 34–40 ^{2OT} | 0 |
| October 31 | 2:00 p.m. | at Southern Miss | M. M. Roberts Stadium; Hattiesburg, MS | ESPN3 | W 30–6 | 0 |
| November 21 | 1:00 p.m. | at North Texas | Apogee Stadium; Denton, TX | ESPN3 | L 17–27 | 5,976 |
| December 5 | 11:00 a.m. | at No. 21 Marshall | Joan C. Edwards Stadium; Huntington, WV | ESPN+ | W 20–0 | 10,429 |
| December 12 | 11:00 a.m. | UAB | Rice Stadium; Houston, TX | ESPN3 | L 16–21 | 2,000 |
Rankings from AP Poll and CFP Rankings after November 24 released prior to game; All times are in Central time

== Game summaries ==
=== Middle Tennessee ===
Middle Tennessee at Rice

| Team | 1 | 2 | 3 | 4 | OT | Total |
|---|---|---|---|---|---|---|
| • Blue Raiders | 0 | 14 | 17 | 3 | 6 | 40 |
| Owls | 6 | 7 | 6 | 14 | 0 | 33 |

- Date: October 24, 2020
- Location: Rice Stadium
  Houston, TX
- Game start: 2:32 p.m. CDT
- Elapsed time: 3 hours and 51 minutes
- Game attendance: 0
- Game weather: 64 °F (18 °C) • Weather: Cloudy • Wind: N 6 MPH
- Referee: Joe Lehring
- TV announcers (ESPN3): David Saltzman (play–by–play) and Taylor McHargue (analyst)

Scoring summary
| 1 | 11:11 | RICE | Collin Riccitelli 34-yard field goal (8 plays, 63 yards, 3:49) | RICE 3–0 |
| 1 | 04:29 | RICE | Collin Riccitelli 45-yard field goal (9 plays, 29 yards, 3:56) | RICE 6–0 |
| 2 | 10:40 | MTSU | Yusuf Ali 25-yard pass from Asher O'Hara (Crews Holt kick) (7 plays, 68 yards, 2:22) | MTSU 7–6 |
| 2 | 01:33 | RICE | August Pitre III 3-yard pass from Mike Collins (Collin Riccitelli kick) (18 plays, 80 yards, 9:07) | RICE 13–7 |
| 2 | 00:30 | MTSU | CJ Windham 21-yard pass from Asher O'Hara (Crews Holt kick) (6 plays, 66 yards, 1:03) | MTSU 14–13 |
| 3 | 11:52 | MTSU | Asher O'Hara 2-yard rush (Crews Holt kick) (7 plays, 62 yards, 3:08) | MTSU 21–13 |
| 3 | 07:55 | MTSU | Jonathan Butler 32-yard fumble returned (Crews Holt kick) (2 plays, 9 yards, 0:49) | MTSU 28–13 |
| 3 | 05:34 | RICE | Austin Trammell 8-yard pass from Mike Collins (two-point pass conversion attempt failed) (5 plays, 65 yards, 2:21) | MTSU 28–19 |
| 3 | 00:00 | MTSU | Crews Holt 20-yard field goal (5 plays, 15 yards, 1:52) | MTSU 31–19 |
| 4 | 11:34 | RICE | Jack Bradley 22-yard pass from Mike Collins (Collin Riccitelli kick) (6 plays, 83 yards, 3:26) | MTSU 31–26 |
| 4 | 00:34 | RICE | Austin Trammell 20-yard pass from Mike Collins (Mike Collins two-point conversion pass to Austin Trammell) (10 plays, 83 yards, 1:50) | RICE 34–31 |
| 4 | 00:00 | MTSU | Crews Holt 48-yard field goal (5 plays, 35 yards, 0:34) | TIE 34–34 |
| 2OT | | MTSU | Asher O'Hara 14-yard rush (4 plays, 25 yards) | MTSU 40–34 |

| Statistics | Middle Tennessee | Rice |
|---|---|---|
| First downs | 22 | 26 |
| Total yards | 451 | 425 |
| Rushing yards | 118 | 183 |
| Passing yards | 333 | 242 |
| Turnovers | 1 | 3 |
| Time of possession | 27:03 | 32:57 |

| Team | Category | Player | Statistics |
|---|---|---|---|
| Middle Tennessee | Passing | Asher O'Hara | 24/33, 333 yards, 2 TDs |
| Middle Tennessee | Rushing | Asher O'Hara | 22 carries, 69 yards, 2 TDs |
| Middle Tennessee | Receiving | CJ Windham | 7 receptions, 109 yards, 1 TD |
| Rice | Passing | Mike Collins | 18/35, 242 yards, 4 TDs, 1 INT |
| Rice | Rushing | Juma Otoviano | 20 carries, 84 yards |
| Rice | Receiving | Austin Trammell | 3 receptions, 76 yards, 2 TDs |

The game was particularly notable for the occurrence of a rare "quadruple doink," in which Rice kicker Collin Riccitelli's field goal attempt during the first overtime period hit the right upright, the crossbar, the left upright and the crossbar again before bouncing back into the field of play as no good.

=== At Southern Miss ===
Rice at Southern Mississippi

| Team | 1 | 2 | 3 | 4 | Total |
|---|---|---|---|---|---|
| • Owls | 3 | 20 | 0 | 7 | 30 |
| Eagles | 0 | 6 | 0 | 0 | 6 |

- Date: October 31, 2020
- Location: M. M. Roberts Stadium
  Hattiesburg, MS
- Game start: 2:05 p.m. CDT
- Elapsed time: 2 hours and 59 minutes
- Game attendance: 0
- Game weather: 67 °F (19 °C) • Weather: Sunny • Wind: ESE 2 MPH
- Referee: Ken Antee
- TV announcers (ESPN3): Jason Baker (play–by–play) and Dustin Almond (analyst)

Scoring summary
| 1 | 02:03 | RICE | Collin Riccitelli 21-yard field goal (14 plays, 80 yards, 7:17) | RICE 3–0 |
| 2 | 14:09 | RICE | Austin Trammell 72-yard pass from Mike Collins (Collin Riccitelli kick) (2 plays, 75 yards, 0:51) | RICE 10–0 |
| 2 | 13:58 | RICE | Jake Bailey 25-yard pass from Mike Collins (Collin Riccitelli PAT failed) (1 play, 25 yards, 0:11) | RICE 16–0 |
| 2 | 08:05 | USM | Briggs Bourgeois 45-yard field goal (13 plays, 47 yards, 5:53) | RICE 16–3 |
| 2 | 02:04 | RICE | Austin Trammell 13-yard pass from Mike Collins (Collin Riccitelli kick) (3 plays, 17 yards, 1:34) | RICE 23–3 |
| 2 | 00:00 | USM | Briggs Bourgeois 26-yard field goal (4 plays, 32 yards, 0:26) | RICE 23–6 |
| 4 | 06:47 | RICE | Austin Trammell 14-yard pass from Mike Collins (Collin Riccitelli kick) (16 plays, 88 yards, 9:00) | RICE 30–6 |

| Statistics | Rice | Southern Miss |
|---|---|---|
| First downs | 22 | 11 |
| Total yards | 412 | 269 |
| Rushing yards | 179 | 100 |
| Passing yards | 233 | 169 |
| Turnovers | 1 | 3 |
| Time of possession | 36:52 | 23:08 |

| Team | Category | Player | Statistics |
|---|---|---|---|
| Rice | Passing | Mike Collins | 12/17, 233 yards, 4 TDs |
| Rice | Rushing | Juma Otoviano | 25 carries, 111 yards |
| Rice | Receiving | Austin Trammell | 7 receptions, 143 yards, 3 TDs |
| Southern Miss | Passing | Jack Abraham | 12/17, 112 yards, 1 INT |
| Southern Miss | Rushing | Frank Gore Jr. | 11 carries, 71 yards |
| Southern Miss | Receiving | Antoine Robinson | 3 receptions, 41 yards |

=== At North Texas ===
Rice at North Texas

| Team | 1 | 2 | 3 | 4 | Total |
|---|---|---|---|---|---|
| Owls | 10 | 0 | 0 | 7 | 17 |
| • Mean Green | 0 | 14 | 3 | 10 | 27 |

- Date: November 21, 2020
- Location: Apogee Stadium
  Denton, TX
- Game start: 1:05 p.m. CDT
- Elapsed time: 3 hours and 4 minutes
- Game attendance: 5,976
- Game weather: 73 °F (23 °C) • Weather: Partly Cloudy • Wind: S 11 MPH
- Referee: Jonathan Noli
- TV announcers (ESPN3): Doug Anderson (play–by–play) and LaDarrin McLane (analyst)

Scoring summary
| 1 | 11:11 | RICE | Collin Riccitelli 45-yard field goal (8 plays, 48 yards, 3:49) | RICE 3–0 |
| 1 | 04:26 | RICE | Austin Trammell 14-yard pass from Mike Collins (Collin Riccitelli kick) (7 plays, 97 yards, 4:01) | RICE 10–0 |
| 2 | 06:56 | UNT | Jason Bean 66-yard rush (Ethan Mooney kick) (4 plays, 89 yards, 1:17) | RICE 10–7 |
| 2 | 01:09 | UNT | Jaelon Darden 25-yard pass from Jason Bean (Ethan Mooney kick) (6 plays, 38 yards, 2:00 | UNT 14–10 |
| 3 | 09:56 | UNT | Ethan Mooney 27-yard field goal (13 plays, 55 yards, 5:04) | UNT 17–10 |
| 4 | 13:03 | UNT | Ethan Mooney 30-yard field goal (9 plays, 67 yards, 2:40) | UNT 20–10 |
| 4 | 07:27 | UNT | DeAndre Torrey 1-yard rush (Ethan Mooney kick) (6 plays, 39 yards, 2:43) | UNT 27–10 |
| 4 | 00:08 | RICE | Jake Bailey 17-yard pass from Mike Collins (Collin Riccitelli kick) (6 plays, 80 yards, 1:18) | UNT 27–17 |

| Statistics | Rice | North Texas |
|---|---|---|
| First downs | 23 | 17 |
| Total yards | 376 | 389 |
| Rushing yards | 49 | 269 |
| Passing yards | 327 | 120 |
| Turnovers | 2 | 0 |
| Time of possession | 36:25 | 23:35 |

| Team | Category | Player | Statistics |
|---|---|---|---|
| Rice | Passing | Mike Collins | 23/34, 327 yards, 2 TDs |
| Rice | Rushing | Khalan Griffin | 20 carries, 72 yards |
| Rice | Receiving | Austin Trammell | 6 receptions, 116 yards, 1 TD |
| North Texas | Passing | Jason Bean | 9/20, 120 yards, 1 TD |
| North Texas | Rushing | DeAndre Torrey | 19 carries, 102 yards, 1 TD |
| North Texas | Receiving | Austin Ogunmakin | 3 receptions, 60 yards |

=== At Marshall ===
Rice at Marshall

| Team | 1 | 2 | 3 | 4 | Total |
|---|---|---|---|---|---|
| • Owls | 7 | 3 | 10 | 0 | 20 |
| No. 21 Thundering Herd | 0 | 0 | 0 | 0 | 0 |

- Date: December 5, 2020
- Location: Joan C. Edwards Stadium
  Huntington, WV
- Game start: 11:05 p.m. CDT
- Elapsed time: 3 hours
- Game attendance: 10,429
- Game weather: 43 °F (6 °C) • Weather: Cloudy • Wind:WNW 6 MPH
- Referee: Ken Antee
- TV announcers (ESPN+): Jake Griffith (play–by–play) and Dave Wilson (analyst)

Scoring summary
| 1 | 01:06 | RICE | Jordan Myers 1-yard rush (Collin Riccitelli kick) (10 plays, 47 yards, 6:48) | RICE 7–0 |
| 2 | 05:49 | RICE | Collin Riccitelli 39-yard field goal (10 plays, 66 yards, 5:21) | RICE 10–0 |
| 3 | 09:24 | RICE | Collin Riccitelli 40-yard field goal (4 plays, 5 yards, 2:21) | RICE 13–0 |
| 3 | 07:50 | RICE | Naeem Smith 36-yard interception returned (Collin Riccitelli kick) (3 plays, -5 yards, 1:34) | RICE 20–0 |

| Statistics | Rice | Marshall |
|---|---|---|
| First downs | 17 | 19 |
| Total yards | 213 | 245 |
| Rushing yards | 127 | 80 |
| Passing yards | 86 | 165 |
| Turnovers | 1 | 5 |
| Time of possession | 36:26 | 23:34 |

| Team | Category | Player | Statistics |
|---|---|---|---|
| Rice | Passing | JoVoni Johnson | 10/14, 86 yards |
| Rice | Rushing | Ari Broussard | 19 carries, 62 yards |
| Rice | Receiving | Jake Bailey | 7 receptions, 57 yards |
| Marshall | Passing | Grant Wells | 18/35, 165 yards, 5 INTs |
| Marshall | Rushing | Brenden Knox | 20 carries, 76 yards |
| Marshall | Receiving | Talik Keaton | 7 receptions, 48 yards |

=== UAB ===
Alabama–Birmingham at Rice

| Team | 1 | 2 | 3 | 4 | Total |
|---|---|---|---|---|---|
| • Blazers | 0 | 7 | 14 | 0 | 21 |
| Owls | 3 | 10 | 0 | 3 | 16 |

- Date: December 12, 2020
- Location: Rice Stadium
  Houston, TX
- Game start: 12:00 p.m. CDT
- Elapsed time: 3 hours and 13 minutes
- Game attendance: 2,000
- Game weather: 68 °F (20 °C) • Weather: Overcast
- Referee: Rodney Burnette
- TV announcers (ESPN3): Matt Pederson (play–by–play) and Taylor McHargue (analyst)

Scoring summary
| 1 | 00:49 | RICE | Collin Riccitelli 40-yard field goal (20 plays, 62 yards, 12:12) | RICE 3–0 |
| 2 | 10:09 | RICE | Collin Riccitelli 35-yard field goal (8 plays, 35 yards, 4:35) | RICE 6–0 |
| 2 | 06:55 | UAB | Lucious Stanley 7-yard rush (Matt Quinn kick) (6 plays, 75 yards, 3:14) | UAB 7–6 |
| 2 | 00:38 | RICE | Jordan Myers 26-yard pass from JoVoni Johnson (Collin Riccitelli kick) (5 plays, 83 yards, 0:41) | RICE 13–7 |
| 3 | 12:46 | UAB | Myron Mitchell 63-yard pass from Tyler Johnson III (Matt Quinn kick) (1 play, 63 yards, 0:10) | UAB 14–13 |
| 3 | 10:16 | UAB | Samario Rudolph 42-yard pass from Tyler Johnson III (Matt Quinn kick) (5 plays, 71 yards, 1:44) | UAB 21–13 |
| 4 | 11:14 | RICE | Collin Riccitelli 40-yard field goal (8 plays, 30 yards, 3:41) | UAB 21–16 |

| Statistics | UAB | Rice |
|---|---|---|
| First downs | 13 | 20 |
| Total yards | 354 | 232 |
| Rushing yards | 137 | 66 |
| Passing yards | 217 | 166 |
| Turnovers | 0 | 1 |
| Time of possession | 22:42 | 37:18 |

| Team | Category | Player | Statistics |
|---|---|---|---|
| UAB | Passing | Tyler Johnson III | 9/18, 217 yards, 2 TDs |
| UAB | Rushing | Tyler Johnson III | 7 carries, 41 yards |
| UAB | Receiving | Myron Mitchell | 1 reception, 63 yards, 1 TD |
| Rice | Passing | JoVoni Johnson | 17/23, 139 yards, 1 TD |
| Rice | Rushing | Khalan Griffin | 14 carries, 34 yards |
| Rice | Receiving | Jake Bailey | 7 receptions, 72 yards |
