= Mike Bloomgren =

American football player and coach (born 1977)

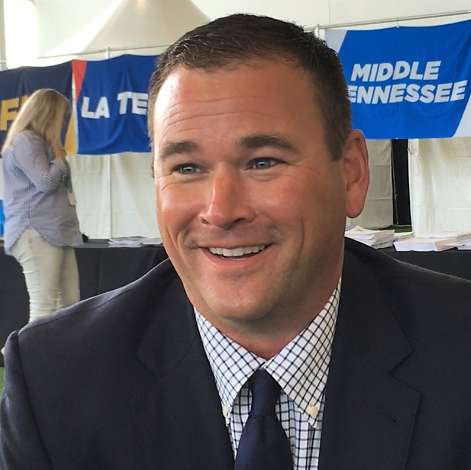
- Bloomgren at 2018 C-USA Kickoff

New York Giants
- Title: Offensive line coach

Personal information
- Born: January 25, 1977 (age 49); Tallahassee, Florida, U.S.

Career information
- Position: Tight end
- College: Culver–Stockton

Career history
- Alabama (1999–2001) Graduate assistant; Catawba (2002–2004) Co-offensive coordinator, offensive line coach & special teams coach; Delta State (2005–2006) Offensive coordinator, offensive line coach & special teams coach; New York Jets (2007–2010); Offensive quality control coach (2007–2008); Offensive assistant (2009–2010); Stanford (2011–2017); Run game coordinator & offensive line coach (2011–2012); Offensive coordinator & offensive line coach (2013); Assistant head coach, offensive coordinator & offensive line coach (2014–2017); Rice (2018–2024) Head coach; Cleveland Browns (2025) Offensive line coach; New York Giants (2026–present) Offensive line coach

Head coaching record
- Career: NCAA: 24–52 (.316)

Michael Scott Bloomgren (born January 25, 1977) is an American professional football coach who is the offensive line coach for the New York Giants of the National Football League (NFL). He previously served as the head football coach at Rice University from 2018 to 2024. Prior to beginning his coaching career, Bloomgren played the tight end position at Culver–Stockton College.

== Early life ==
Bloomgren prepped at Florida High School in Tallahassee, Florida. He played college football as a tight end at Culver–Stockton College. He graduated from Florida State University magna cum laude with his bachelor's degree in sports management, with a minor in business, in 1999.

During his time at Florida State, he also worked as an undergraduate assistant to the linebackers.

== Coaching career ==
=== Alabama ===
In 1999, Bloomgren became a graduate assistant at the University of Alabama. While at Alabama, he earned his master's degree in higher education administration with a 4.0 GPA.

=== Catawba College ===
After earning his graduate degree, Bloomgren went on to serve as an assistant at Catawba College from January 2002 to March 2005.

=== Delta State ===
From March 2005 to February 2007, Bloomgren served as the offensive coordinator, offensive line and special teams coach at Delta State University.

=== New York Jets ===
After leaving Delta State in February 2007, Bloomgren had a three-week stint at Texas A&M before accepting an offensive quality control position with the New York Jets. He served in this position under Brian Schottenheimer, and Bill Callahan. In 2009, when Rex Ryan became the head coach of the New York Jets, Bloomgren accepted a position as assistant offensive coordinator.

=== Stanford ===
In 2011, Bloomgren accepted the running game coordinator/offensive line coaching position at Stanford under head coach David Shaw.

Bloomgren was promoted to offensive coordinator in January 2013. As OC, he coached Christian McCaffrey, who was the first Stanford running back to rush for 2,000 yards and surpassed Barry Sanders' NCAA record of 3,250 all-purpose yards, finishing with 3,864.

=== Rice ===
On December 5, 2017, it was announced that Bloomgren was hired to replace David Bailiff as the head coach at Rice University.

Despite two bowl appearances, Rice never had a winning season under Bloomgren's tenure, and their best season against conference teams was a 4-4 season in 2023. One highlight of his time at Rice was coaching future NFL wide receiver Luke McCaffrey, who transferred to Rice from Nebraska in 2021. McCaffrey, the son of Ed and brother of Christian, was named to the 2023 All-AAC conference team, and was later drafted in the 3rd round of the 2024 NFL draft by the Washington Commanders.

Rice fired Bloomgren on October 27, 2024, after a 2–6 start to the 2024 season. Pete Alamar succeeded him as interim head coach.

=== Cleveland Browns ===
On January 8, 2025, Bloomgren was hired by the Cleveland Browns as their offensive line coach under head coach Kevin Stefanski.

=== New York Giants ===
On February 18, 2026, the New York Giants hired Bloomgren as their offensive line coach under head coach John Harbaugh.

== Head coaching record ==
=== College ===
Year	Team	Overall	Conference	Standing	Bowl/playoffs
Rice Owls (Conference USA) (2018–2022)
2018	Rice	2–11	1–7	T–6th (West)	
2019	Rice	3–9	3–5	T–4th (West)	
2020	Rice	2–3	2–3	5th (West)	
2021	Rice	4–8	3–5	5th (West)	
2022	Rice	5–8	3–5	T–7th	L LendingTree
Rice Owls (American Athletic Conference) (2023–2024)
2023	Rice	6–7	4–4	T–5th	L First Responder
2024	Rice	2–6	1–3	(Note: Rice fired Bloomgren after 8 games.)	
Rice:		24–52	17–32		
Total:		24–52			
