= Austin Trammell =

American football player (born 1998)

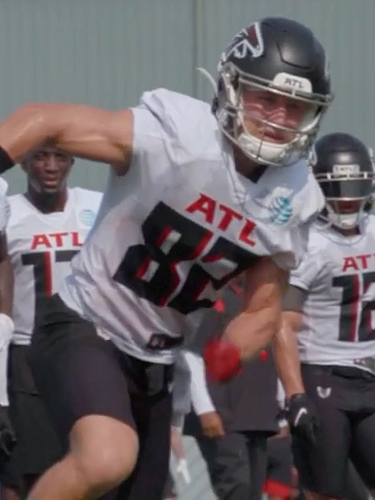
- Trammell with the Atlanta Falcons in 2021

No. 81 – Jacksonville Jaguars
- Position: Wide receiver
- Roster status: Practice squad

Personal information
- Born: July 4, 1998 (age 28); Alexandria, Louisiana, U.S.
- Listed height: 5 ft 10 in (1.78 m)
- Listed weight: 185 lb (84 kg)

Career information
- High school: Klein (Klein, Texas)
- College: Rice (2017–2020)
- NFL draft: 2021: undrafted

Career history
- Atlanta Falcons (2021); Los Angeles Rams (2022–2023); Jacksonville Jaguars (2024–present)

Career NFL statistics as of 2025
- Receptions: 11
- Receiving yards: 128
- Return yards: 360
- Stats at Pro Football Reference

Stephen Austin Trammell (born July 4, 1998) is an American professional football wide receiver for the Jacksonville Jaguars of the National Football League (NFL). He played college football for the Rice Owls.

== College career ==
Trammell was a member of the Rice Owls for four seasons. He finished his career with 142 receptions for 1,744 yards and 13 touchdowns.

== Professional career ==
Pre-draft measurables
Height	Weight	Arm length	Hand span	Wingspan	40-yard dash	10-yard split	20-yard split	20-yard shuttle	Three-cone drill	Vertical jump	Broad jump	Bench press
5 ft 10 1/8 in (1.78 m)	181 lb (82 kg)	28 1/8 in (0.71 m)	9 1/2 in (0.24 m)	5 ft 9 1/8 in (1.76 m)	4.62 s	1.57 s	2.67 s	4.11 s	6.75 s	40.0 in (1.02 m)	10 ft 4 in (3.15 m)	21 reps
All values from Pro Day

=== Atlanta Falcons ===
Trammell was signed by the Atlanta Falcons as an undrafted free agent on May 1, 2021. He was waived on August 24, during the second round of preseason cuts. Trammell was re-signed by the Falcons to their practice squad on September 1. He was elevated to the active roster on January 2, 2022, for the team's Week 17 game against the Buffalo Bills and made his NFL debut in the game. Trammell signed a reserve/future contract with the Falcons on January 10.

On June 16, 2022, Trammell was released by the Falcons.

=== Los Angeles Rams ===
On August 4, 2022, Trammell signed with the Los Angeles Rams. He was waived on August 30, and re-signed to the practice squad the next day. Trammell was promoted to the active roster on December 3.

On August 29, 2023, Trammell was waived by the Rams and re-signed to the practice squad. He was promoted to the active roster on October 7.

=== Jacksonville Jaguars ===
On June 12, 2024, Trammell signed with the Jacksonville Jaguars. He was waived on August 27, and re-signed to the practice squad. Trammell signed a reserve/future contract with Jacksonville on January 6, 2025.

Trammel was waived by the Jaguars on August 27, 2025. He was re-signed to the practice squad two days later. Trammell was promoted to the active roster on October 31. On December 1, he was waived and re-signed to the practice squad. He signed a reserve/future contract with Jacksonville on January 12, 2026.

On August 30, 2026, Trammel was released by the Jaguars as a part of final roster cuts; he was re-signed to the team's practice squad the next day.
