= 2020 New Mexico State Aggies football team =

American college football season

2020 New Mexico State Aggies football
- Conference: Independent
- Record: 1–1
- Head coach: Doug Martin (8th season)
- Associate head coach: Oliver Soukup (4th season)
- Offensive scheme: Air raid
- Defensive coordinator: Frank Spaziani (5th season)
- Base defense: 3–3–5
- Captains: Alex Escobar; Sage Doxtate; Donavan King; Trevor Brohard
- Home stadium: Sun Bowl

2020 NCAA Division I FBS independents football records
	Conf.			Overall
Team	W		L	W		L
No. 11 BYU		–		11	–	1
No. 17 Liberty		–		10	–	1
Army		–		9	–	3
New Mexico State		–		1	–	1
UMass		–		0	–	4
Note: Due to COVID-19, UConn canceled the 2020 football season; New Mexico State was the only FBS school to play a spring schedule.; Rankings from AP Poll.

The 2020 New Mexico State Aggies football team represented New Mexico State University as an independent during the 2020 NCAA Division I FBS football season. The Aggies were led by eighth–year head coach Doug Martin and played their home games at the Sun Bowl in El Paso, Texas due to COVID-19 restrictions imposed by the state of New Mexico. On August 13, 2020, New Mexico State suspended all sports competitions due to the COVID-19 pandemic. The Aggies played an abbreviated two-game season in February and March 2021, compiling a record of 1–1.

== Schedule ==
=== Original ===
Date	Opponent	Site	Result
August 29	at UCLA	Rose Bowl; Pasadena, CA	No contest
September 3	at UAB	Legion Field; Birmingham, AL	No contest
September 12	Akron	Aggie Memorial Stadium; Las Cruces, NM	No contest
September 19	New Mexico	Aggie Memorial Stadium; Las Cruces, NM (Rio Grande Rivalry)	No contest
September 26	at UTEP	Sun Bowl; El Paso, TX (Battle of I-10)	No contest
October 3	Texas State	Aggie Memorial Stadium; Las Cruces, NM	No contest
October 10	at Hawaii	Aloha Stadium; Halawa, HI	No contest
October 17	at Fresno State	Bulldog Stadium; Fresno, CA	No contest
October 24	Louisiana^{†}	Aggie Memorial Stadium; Las Cruces, NM	No contest
November 7	at UMass	Warren McGuirk Alumni Stadium; Hadley, MA	No contest
November 14	Texas Southern	Aggie Memorial Stadium; Las Cruces, NM	No contest
November 21	at Florida	Ben Hill Griffin Stadium; Gainesville, FL	No contest
^{†}Homecoming

=== Revised ===
Date	Time	Opponent	Site	TV	Result	Attendance
February 21, 2021	3:00 p.m.	Tarleton State	Sun Bowl; El Paso, TX	FSAZ, FloSports, Comcast	L 17–43	0
February 27, 2021		New Mexico Highlands	Sun Bowl; El Paso, TX		No contest	
March 7, 2021	3:00 p.m.	Dixie State	Sun Bowl; El Paso, TX	FSAZ+, FloSports/Comcast	W 36–29	0
All times are in Mountain time

== Personnel ==
2020 New Mexico State Aggies football team roster
Players
Coaches
Offense

Pos.	#	Name	Class
WR	1	Jared Wyatt	Sr
WR	2	Isaiah Garcia–Castaneda	So
WR	3	Jalyne McFall	Fr
WR	4	Robert Downs III	Sr
WR	5	Ja'Darion Smith	Fr
WR	6	Justice Powers	Jr
WR	7	Terrell Warner	Jr
WR	8	Tevis Abraham	Jr
RB	9	Juwaun Price	Fr
QB	10	Jonah Johnson	Jr
WR	11	Andre Bodison	Sr
WR	13	Ron Vann	Fr
WR	14	Cole Harrity	So
QB	15	Clay Houghtaling	Fr
RB	16	Larenzo McMillan	Fr
QB	17	Weston Eget	Fr
QB	19	Luke Wilson	So
RB	20	Tim Gans	Fr
RB	21	Alex Escobar (C)	So
RB	22	Eli Anderson	Jr
RB	23	Chris Ramos	Fr
RB	24	O'Maury Samuels	Jr
WR	40	Jahre Fish	Sr
TE	45	Tyler Roebuck	So
OL	54	Isaiah Mursalat	So
OL	55	Garrison Tullos	Sr
OL	61	Eli Johnson	GS
OL	62	Jae'Vone Brown	Fr
OL	63	Stephawn Townsend	Jr
OL	64	Preston Thomazin	So
OL	65	Eddy Lazalde	Fr
OL	69	Isaac Gonzalez	Fr
OL	70	David Ash	Jr
OL	73	Luteru Fedler	Fr
OL	75	Evan Tafoya-Vallo	So
OL	76	Sage Doxtater (C)	Sr
OL	77	Carson Pharris	Fr
OL	78	Gabriel Preciado	Jr
WR	81	Ivan Avina	So
WR	82	Sol Rascon	Sr
WR	83	Lawrence Dixon	Jr
TE	85	Thomaz Whitford	Jr
WR	86	James Palmer	Jr
TE	87	Grant Oberheu	Fr
TE	88	Jacob Franklin	So
TE	89	Ty Ely	Fr

Defense

Pos.	#	Name	Class
DB	1	Devlin Kirklin	Jr
DB	2	Chris Bell	Jr
LB	4	Joshua Ferguson	Fr
LB	6	Michael Bowe Jr.	Sr
DB	7	D.J. McCullough	Jr
DB	8	Olan Cazad Jr.	Fr
CB	9	Antonio Oliver	Jr
DL	10	Lazarus Williams	Jr
DB	12	Caleb Mills	Sr
DB	13	Jonas Breton	Sr
DB	14	Brandon Shivers	Fr
DB	15	Ronnie Sanders II	Fr
DB	16	Justin Stinson	Fr
DB	19	Daemahni Williams	Jr
LB	21	James Blowers	Jr
DB	22	Xavier Hinkle	Jr
LB	23	Dalton Bowles	So
LB	24	Nick Giacolone	Fr
DL	25	Lama Lavea	Fr
DL	26	Donavan King (C)	Jr
DB	30	Xzavier Guyton	So
LB	31	Mike Edwards	So
LB	36	Dylan Zolezzi	Fr
DB	37	Johnny Tamayo	Fr
DB	38	Carlos Almuina	Fr
DB	39	Isaac Gallegos	Fr
LB	41	Brennon Davis	Sr
LB	42	Shamar Smith	Fr
LB	43	Taylor Milton	Fr
LB	48	Eric Marsh	Jr
LB	49	Dylan Grant	Jr
DL	53	Jake Harrelson	Sr
DL	72	Justin Segura	So
LB	80	Trevor Brohard (C)	Jr
DL	90	Marcus Buckley	Jr
DL	91	De'Shawn Johnson	Fr
DL	92	Amari Pouncy	Fr
DL	94	Charles Okpala	So
DL	96	Garrett Bishop	Fr
DL	98	Zach Stokes	So
DL	99	Dassani Freeman	Jr

Special teams

Pos.	#	Name	Class
P	28	Carson Zilmer	Fr
PK	29	Brett Money	Fr
LS	34	Austin Reeves	Jr
P	35	Josh Carlson	So
LS	44	Logan MacGregor	Fr
PK	84	Ethan Albertson	So

Head coach

- Doug Martin (Kentucky)
  Offensive Coordinator

Coordinators/assistant coaches

- Oliver Soukup (New Mexico State)
  Assistant Head Coach
  Linebackers
- Frank Spaziani (Penn State)
  Defensive Coordinator
- Brian Bell (Bemidji State and Dakota State)
  Defensive Backs
- Matt Christian (Palomar and New Mexico State)
  Running Backs
  Special Teams
  Academic Coordinator
- Chili Davis (Campbell)
  Inside Receivers
  Tight Ends
  Special Teams
- Chase Holbrook (Southeastern Louisiana and New Mexico State)
  Quarterbacks
- Cory Martin (Kent State)
  Wide Receivers
  Recruiting Coordinator
- John Mumford (Pittsburg State)
  Defensive Line
- Ronnie Pentz (San Diego)
  Special Teams Coordinator
- Cory White (Humboldt State and Whittier)
  Offensive Line

Legend

- (C) Team captain
- (S) Suspended
- (I) Ineligible
- Injured
- Redshirt

Roster
Last update: March 5, 2021

== Game summaries ==
=== Tarleton State ===
Tarleton State at New Mexico State

Team	1	2	3	4	Total
• Texans (Div. I FCS)	23	10	7	3	43
Aggies	7	0	3	7	17

- Date: February 21, 2021
- Location: Sun Bowl
  El Paso, TX
- Game start: 3:07 p.m. MST
- Elapsed time: 3 hours and 42 minutes
- Game attendance: 0
- Game weather: Temperature: 58 °F (14 °C) • Weather: Sunny • Wind: NW 13 MPH
- Referee: Christian Watson
- TV announcers (FSAZ/FloSports/Comcast): Adam Young (play–by–play) and Danny Knee (analyst)

Scoring summary
1	14:36	TSU	Cameron Burston 70–yard run (Christian Hernandez kick) (1 play, 75 yards, 0:24)	TSU 7–0
1	11:31	TSU	Gabriel Douglas 86–yard pass from Cameron Burston (Christian Hernandez kick) (1 play, 86 yards, 0:12)	TSU 14–0
1	11:19	NMSU	Juwuan Price 94–yard kickoff return (Ethan Albertson kick)	TSU 14–7
1	06:42	TSU	Team 0–yard safety	TSU 16–7
1	03:29	TSU	Cameron Burston 21–yard run (Christian Hernandez kick) (7 plays, 51 yards, 3:07)	TSU 23–7
2	07:16	TSU	Gabriel Douglas 29–yard pass from Cameron Burston (Christian Hernandez kick) (4 plays, 55 yards, 1:12)	TSU 30–7
2	00:00	TSU	Adrian Guzman 35–yard field goal (9 plays, 52 yards, 2:42)	TSU 33–7
3	14:11	TSU	DeAngelo Rosemond 4–yard run (Christian Hernandez kick) (2 plays, 5 yards, 0:28)	TSU 40–7
3	01:56	NMSU	Ethan Albertson 27–yard field goal (6 plays, 67 yards, 2:19)	TSU 40–10
4	13:38	TSU	Adrian Guzman 34–yard field goal (7 plays, 57 yards, 3:18)	TSU 43–10
4	03:28	NMSU	Robert Downs III 27–yard pass from Jonah Johnson (Ethan Albertson kick) (4 plays, 65 yards, 1:01)	TSU 43–17

Statistics	TSU	NMSU
First downs	24	14
Total yards	501	241
Rushing yards	249	54
Passing yards	252	187
Turnovers	0	3
Time of possession	35:40	24:20

Team	Category	Player	Statistics
Tarleton State	Passing	Cameron Burston	15/29, 252 yards, 2 TD
Tarleton State	Rushing	Cameron Burston	4 carries, 79 yards, 2 TD
Tarleton State	Receiving	Gabriel Douglas	7 receptions, 190 yards, 2 TD
New Mexico State	Passing	Jonah Johnson	17/31, 187 yards, TD, 3 INT
New Mexico State	Rushing	Juwuan Price	14 carries, 31 yards
New Mexico State	Receiving	Terrell Warner	5 receptions, 77 yards

=== New Mexico Highlands (no contest) ===
New Mexico Highlands at New Mexico State (No Contest)

Team	1	2	3	4	Total
~~Cowboys (Div. II)~~	0	0	0	0	0
~~Aggies~~	0	0	0	0	0

- Date: ~~February 27, 2021~~
- Location: ~~Sun Bowl~~
  ~~El Paso, TX~~

The New Mexico Highlands at New Mexico State game was canceled due to COVID-19 protocols and the game was not rescheduled.

=== Dixie State ===
Dixie State at New Mexico State

Team	1	2	3	4	Total
Trailblazers (Div. I FCS)	7	7	7	8	29
• Aggies	0	10	10	16	36

- Date: March 7, 2021
- Location: Sun Bowl
  El Paso, TX
- Game start: 3:08 p.m. MST
- Elapsed time: 3 hours and 38 minutes
- Game attendance: 0
- Game weather: Temperature: N/A • Weather: Sunny • Wind: N/A
- Referee: Kevin Hassell
- TV announcers (FSAZ+/FloSports/Comcast): Adam Young (play–by–play) and Danny Knee (analyst)

Scoring summary
1	09:15	DSU	Quali Conley 57–yard run (James Baird kick) (5 plays, 76 yards, 2:15)	DSU 7–0
2	10:39	NMSU	Ethan Albertson 35–yard field goal (14 plays, 69 yards, 6:35)	DSU 7–3
2	07:36	DSU	Kody Wilstead 1–yard run (James Baird kick) (7 plays, 75 yards, 3:03)	DSU 14–3
2	02:28	NMSU	Andre Bodison 12–yard pass from Weston Eget (Ethan Albertson kick) (4 plays, 62 yards, 1:28)	DSU 14–10
3	08:30	NMSU	Jonah Johnson 1–yard run (Ethan Albertson kick) (10 plays, 71 yards, 4:04)	NMSU 17–14
3	02:38	NMSU	Ethan Albertson 33–yard field goal (7 plays, 74 yards, 3:01)	NMSU 20–14
3	02:02	DSU	Jalen Powell 65–yard pass from Kody Wilstead (James Baird kick) (2 plays, 75 yards, 0:36)	DSU 21–20
4	13:10	NMSU	Jonah Johnson 1–yard run (pass failed) (10 plays, 55 yards, 3:42)	NMSU 26–21
4	06:03	NMSU	Ethan Albertson 32–yard field goal (9 plays, 56 yards, 3:23)	NMSU 29–21
4	05:52	DSU	Quali Conley 75–yard pass from Kody Wilstead (Chase Hess pass) (1 play, 75 yards, 0:11)	TIE 29–29
4	00:21	NMSU	Juwaun Price 13–yard run (Ethan Albertson kick) (7 plays, 54 yards, 2:05)	NMSU 36–29

Statistics	Dixie State	New Mexico State
First downs	18	33
Total yards	483	561
Rushing yards	124	329
Passing yards	359	232
Turnovers	3	1
Time of possession	24:42	35:18

Team	Category	Player	Statistics
Dixie State	Passing	Kody Wilstead	25/37, 359 yards, 2 TDs
Dixie State	Rushing	Quali Conley	11 carries, 95 yards, 1 TD
Dixie State	Receiving	Quali Conley	4 receptions, 98 yards, 1 TD
New Mexico State	Passing	Jonah Johnson	19/29, 171 yards
New Mexico State	Rushing	Juwaun Price	19 carries, 165 yards, 1 TD
New Mexico State	Receiving	Isaiah Garcia-Castaneda	4 receptions, 56 yards
