= 2020 NCAA Division I FBS football season =

American college football season

2020 NCAA Division I FBS season
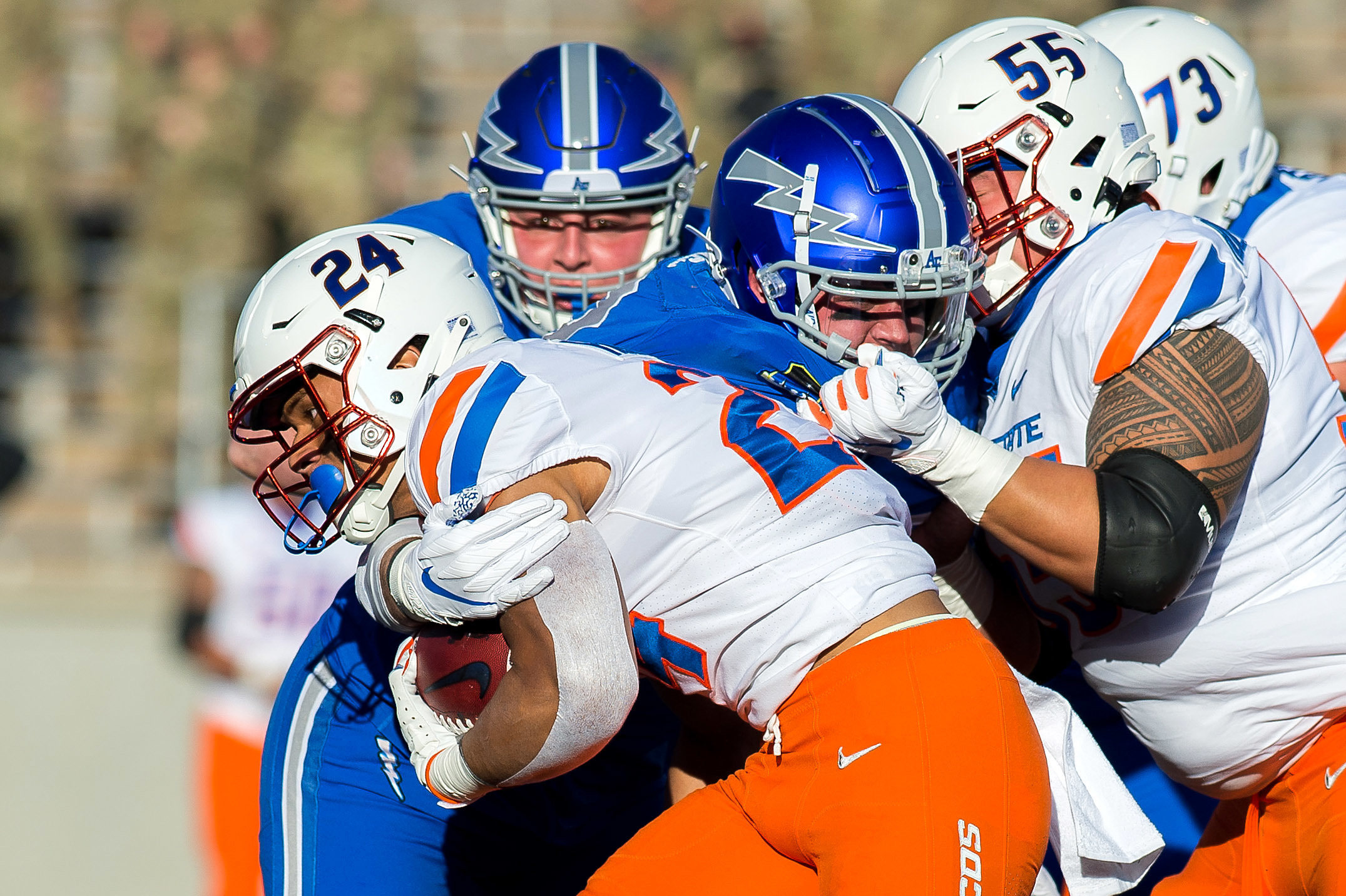
- Air Force defensive tackle George Silvanic holds back Boise State running back George Holani and offensive lineman Kekaniokoa Holomalia-Gonzalez on October 31 at Falcon Stadium.
- Number of teams: 128 (Note: Old Dominion and UConn canceled their 2020 seasons due to COVID-19 concerns. New Mexico State canceled its fall 2020 schedule, instead playing in spring 2021 against programs at other levels.)
- Duration: September 3, 2020 – December 19, 2020 (Note: End date does not include non-FBS games scheduled by New Mexico State for the spring of 2021.)
- Preseason AP No. 1: Clemson

Postseason
- Duration: December 21, 2020 – January 11, 2021
- Bowl games: 26 (Note: Bowl count includes the National Championship game.)
- AP Poll No. 1: Alabama
- Coaches Poll No. 1: Alabama
- Heisman Trophy: DeVonta Smith, WR, Alabama

College Football Playoff
- 2021 College Football Playoff National Championship
- Site: Hard Rock Stadium; Miami Gardens, Florida
- Champion(s): Alabama

NCAA Division I FBS football seasons
- ← 2019 2021 →

The 2020 NCAA Division I FBS football season was the 151st season of college football in the United States, organized by the National Collegiate Athletic Association (NCAA) at its highest level, the Football Bowl Subdivision. The regular season ran from September 3 to December 19, 2020. Shortly after, the postseason began on December 21, 2020, culminating in the 2021 College Football Playoff National Championship on January 11, 2021, at Hard Rock Stadium in Miami Gardens, Florida. The Alabama Crimson Tide defeated the Ohio State Buckeyes to claim the national championship with a final score of 52-24.

The season was heavily impacted by the COVID-19 pandemic in the United States; all of the Power Five conferences initially announced plans to play a fall football season beginning on August 29, but they greatly reduced non-conference games to limit the extent of interstate travel. The Atlantic Coast Conference (ACC), Big 12, Southeastern Conference (SEC) as well as several other Group of Five conferences began their seasons in September while independent Notre Dame agreed to play a full conference schedule with the ACC.

In August, the Big Ten, Pac-12, Mid-American Conference (MAC), Mountain West, and several independents announced they would delay their football seasons until further notice due to concerns regarding the COVID-19 pandemic, targeting the possibility of playing in the spring of 2021 instead. By late September, however, the four conferences reversed their decisions and announced plans to play shortened seasons.

Some postseason activities, including the final College Football Playoff (CFP) rankings and the Heisman Trophy nominations, were delayed to provide flexibility for conferences to finish delayed seasons in mid-December. Several bowl games were canceled due to recommendations by local health officials or because they could not secure teams after multiple programs had opted out of bowl games due to COVID-19 concerns. Other contests saw extraordinary relocations; the Rose Bowl was played outside of Pasadena, California, for the first time since 1942, and the New Mexico Bowl was played in Frisco, Texas.

== Conference realignment ==
=== Membership changes ===
School	Former conference	New conference	Notes
UConn Huskies	American Athletic Conference	Independent	UConn canceled their 2020 season
Notre Dame Fighting Irish	Independent	Atlantic Coast Conference	Conference member for 2020 only

== Rule changes ==
The following rule changes were approved by the NCAA Playing Rules Oversight Panel for 2020:

- Players ejected for targeting were disqualified but permitted to remain on the sidelines instead of returning to the locker room. Players ejected for other reasons (two unsportsmanlike conduct penalties, fighting, contact with officials, etc.) were sent to the locker room.
- Restrictions on the number of players on a team wearing the same uniform number to two; such players still could not be on the field at the same time and had to play different positions.
- Inclusion of zero as a legal uniform number, available to any position that permits single-digit numbers.
- Extended the official's jurisdiction before kickoff from 60 to 90 minutes, requiring a coach from each team to be on the field during warm-ups, and identifying each player by number.
- Defensive teams were allowed to briefly have twelve players on the field to anticipate the offensive formation. However, having twelve (or more) players on the field at the snap was a live-ball five-yard penalty for illegal substitution. Previously, this foul was a dead-ball foul, called if the defense had twelve (or more) players on the field for at least three seconds.
- Adoption of a limit to 2 minutes maximum for instant replay reviews. Exceptions were to be allowed in "exceptionally complicated" or end-of-game situations.
- In the case of personal fouls and unsportsmanlike conduct penalties committed by the defense during a play that resulted in a touchdown, the offense had the option to have the penalty take effect on the try, the ensuing kickoff, or the succeeding spot (if in overtime).
- If the game clock expired at the end of a half and a replay determined that time was remaining, but the game situation called for the clock to start on the referee's signal, the half ended. This applied unless the replay determined that the clock should have stopped with three or more seconds left.

== Other headlines ==
The following headlines were relevant to the 2020 NCAA Division 1 FBS football season:

- February 18 – The NCAA announced that it was considering a proposal that would allow student-athletes in all sports a one-time waiver to transfer to a new school without having to sit out a season. This would place all NCAA sports under the same transfer rules; currently, first-time transfers are only required to sit out a season in baseball, men's and women's basketball, football, and men's ice hockey. The existing criteria for the waiver would be extended to these five sports—namely, a player must receive a transfer release from his or her previous school, leave that school academically eligible, maintain academic progress at the new school, and not be under any disciplinary suspension.
- February 20 – Pitt's football program was placed on three years probation as part of a series of violations announced by the Division I Committee on Infractions, which also included violations from their men's basketball team and former head coach Kevin Stallings. The football infractions resulted from a scheme where non-coaching "quality control" staffers performed coaching duties. If people from outside the football program were present at practice, music would be played to alert the staffers to their presence so they could leave. Pat Narduzzi was present at a football practice while three staff members performed coaching duties and were ordered to be held out of practice for two days in August. The school received other sanctions.
- February 26 – The new LA Bowl was announced on February 26, matching the Mountain West's No. 1 team against the Pac-12's No. 5. Beginning in December, the game was to be held at SoFi Stadium, the new 70,240-seat home of the Los Angeles Chargers and Rams in Inglewood, California. The LA Bowl is locked in at SoFi from 2020 to 2025.
- December 3 – The Knight Commission, a non-NCAA group backing college athletics reform whose membership includes many university presidents and former athletic directors, recommended that FBS football be separated from the NCAA, with FBS programs becoming part of a new body that would take over all roles that the NCAA now assumes concerning that sport. All other sports at FBS schools would remain under NCAA governance, and the NCAA would continue to govern all lower levels of football, including NCAA Division I Football Championship Subdivision (FCS).

== Impact of the COVID-19 pandemic ==
=== Season preparations ===
Multiple universities and conferences had already canceled their spring football games as part of the wider, nationwide suspension of organized sports and athletics due to the COVID-19 pandemic. On March 13, the NCAA announced a suspension of all the division on-campus and off-campus recruiting until April 15. In regards to its impact on the regular season, NCAA president Mark Emmert stated on May 8 that individual decisions on fall semester sports would likely begin to appear as early as June or around July 4. He suggested that the operation of athletics programs would depend on students being present on-campus to a degree (but not necessarily "up and running in the full normal model"), explaining that "you have to treat the health and well-being of the athletes at least as much as the regular students", but that "this is going to be a very unusual school year, and we just have to make the best of it".

The NCAA Division I Council prohibited on-campus activities through May 31; on May 20, the Council voted to end the moratorium and allow voluntary on-campus activity in football and basketball to begin June 1, subject to new safety protocols. On June 17, the Division I Council approved a timetable for a season assumed to begin September 5, including beginning non-voluntary training activities on July 13.

On June 24, USA Today reported that at least 37 FBS schools had reported positive cases of COVID-19 among student-athletes or staff since practices resumed. Amidst a spike in cases in the Southern U.S. since late June, several state governors, including Asa Hutchinson of Arkansas, Brian Kemp of Georgia, and Henry McMaster of South Carolina, have warned that football season could be threatened if cases do not subside in time.

On July 13, it was announced that the Patriot League would not be participating in a football season this year. However, the United States Military Academy as well as the Naval Academy were not included in the settlement as their school superintendent was in charge of making decisions regarding whether their athletic programs would have their seasons.

On July 16, the NCAA released a series of recommendations regarding protocols for fall sports, including that all participants in "high contact risk sports" be tested, with results within 72 hours of play. President Emmert noted, however, that the guidelines presumed that the infection rate would be "manageable", and that "If there is to be college sports in the fall, we need to get a much better handle on the pandemic." The American Athletic Conference announced the same day that it will adhere to this protocol; commissioner Michael Aresco stated that "with the proper quarantine and the proper canvassing of close contacts, we think at this point it would be safe to play games." On July 18, the SEC announced that it would still honor scholarships for players who opt out of the fall season due to safety concerns.

On July 28, by request of the Football Oversight Committee, the NCAA announced that it had issued a blanket waiver to allow any team to play in "Week 0", to allow for greater scheduling flexibility amid changing conditions.

On August 12, members of the NCAA Division I council met and discussed eligibility for student-athletes. They recommended to the Division I board that athletes should be granted an extension on their 5-year eligibility due to the pandemic.

If conditions do not improve by the traditional timeframe of football season, the possibility of delaying the football season entirely to spring 2021 was suggested by several coaches. However, it was largely considered by them to be a last resort. Aresco commented that such a delay would likely require practices to be held over the winter indoors—environments that have been shown to exacerbate the spread of COVID-19.

=== Conference responses ===
All of the Power Five conferences initially announced that they would go on with their season as scheduled but with cuts to non-conference games to overcome logistical concerns and reduce interstate travel. The Big Ten, Pac-12, and SEC were all limiting play to in-conference opponents only. The ACC and Big 12 would allow one non-conference game each, with the ACC restricting them to in-state opponents. The ACC also suspended the use of divisions, with the top two teams in conference play by winning percentage advancing to the ACC Championship Game.

The restrictions complicated matters for FBS independents; the first four games of the BYU Cougars were all against Big Ten and Pac-12 teams, while Notre Dame lost three of its marquee games of the season—including one against Wisconsin that was to be played at Lambeau Field, and traditional rivalry games against Stanford (not held for the first time since 1996) and USC (postponed for the first time since 1945 due to World War II). Notre Dame and Navy had also canceled a planned international game in Dublin, Ireland, and tentatively rescheduled it for Navy–Marine Corps Memorial Stadium. Some FCS conferences (such as the Patriot League) canceled or postponed the football season outright, affecting games against FBS opponents.

On July 29, it was announced that Notre Dame had agreed to play an ACC conference schedule for the 2020 season; the Fighting Irish is a member of the ACC in all other sports besides football and men's ice hockey, the latter a sport not sponsored by the ACC). The team was incorporated into its scheduling model, playing 10 games against ACC opponents (expanding from six already scheduled as part of existing agreements with the conference) and being eligible to compete for the conference championship. Notre Dame pooled its media rights revenue from NBC with that of the ACC's other media rights and was eligible to receive a share of the total revenue.

Among the Group of Five conferences, Conference USA announced on August 7 that it had approved an eight-game schedule with up to four non-conference games. The next day, however, the Mid-American Conference (MAC) announced the postponement of all fall sports for the 2020 season, including football. The conference stated that it would pursue attempts to play in spring 2021. With this decision, the MAC became the first FBS conference to cancel or postpone the football season. Commissioner Jon Steinbrecher stated that "there are simply too many unknowns to put our student-athletes into situations that are not clearly understood." The cancellation of non-conference games by the Power Five conferences—especially the Big Ten—was also expected to have a financial impact on its schools, with the Big Ten games alone expected to bring $11 million.

In the wake of the decision, ESPN reported on August 9 that the commissioners of the Power Five conferences had held an emergency meeting to discuss possible options for fall sports, amid the worsening state of the pandemic in the United States. On August 10, the Mountain West Conference (MWC) followed the MAC as the second Group of Five conference to postpone fall sports indefinitely. Despite the postponement, Air Force would still contest the Commander-in-Chief's Trophy games against Navy and Army.

On August 11, the Big Ten became the first Power Five conference to postpone fall sports, followed shortly thereafter by the Pac-12. The Nebraska Cornhuskers of the Big Ten disclosed an intent to attempt non-conference play in the fall, although the logistical aspects of such a move (including scheduling) and possible repercussions within the conference were unknown. Commissioner Kevin Warren confirmed that Nebraska could not do so as a member of the Big Ten. A major factor in the Big Ten's decision was cardiovascular complications from the virus, while the Pac-12 cited that rapid testing capabilities would be needed to resume play.

Following the decisions, the ACC, Big 12, and SEC all issued statements affirming their intent to play as scheduled in the fall. The Big Ten's decision became politicized, with President Donald Trump having criticized closures of university campuses, and having pushed in particular for the Big Ten to play in the fall. After the decision to postpone the season, the Big Ten formed a taskforce to investigate options for a return to play.

On September 16, the Big Ten approved an eight-game conference season that would begin October 24, and conclude on December 19 with cross-division matchups between each seed (with the game between the top seeds played as the Big Ten Championship Game). The conference instituted a daily antigen testing protocol beginning September 30; PCR tests were used to confirm positives found via antigen testing. Players who tested positive on both tests were removed from play for at least 21 days underwent cardiac tests during this period, and were required to be cleared by a cardiologist before they could return to play. Teams with a positivity rate above 5%, or whose population has a positivity rate above 7%, were required to halt all activity for seven days.

In response to the Big Ten's reversal, Pac-12 commissioner Larry Scott stated that the conference was awaiting authorization by health officials in California and Oregon to resume full-contact practices and that it was also monitoring the air quality impact of ongoing wildfires in the western United States. The conference secured a provider for rapid testing earlier in the month. On September 24, the Pac-12 officially announced that it would allow football, basketball, and winter sports seasons to resume, with plans to play a seven-game conference season beginning on November 6, and concluding with the Pac-12 Championship Game on December 18.

The same day, the Mountain West announced that it too had approved an eight-game conference season beginning October 24. The next day, the MAC unanimously approved a six-game season beginning in November.

On November 19, the Pac-12 lifted a restriction on non-conference home games.

=== Impact on the postseason ===
On July 15, the Rose Parade was canceled due to the pandemic. The same day, the NCAA announced that FBS teams would be permitted to count two wins against FCS teams, instead of the usual one, towards bowl eligibility. The NCAA later waived bowl eligibility requirements for the 2020–21 bowl season.

On August 5, the College Football Playoff (CFP) announced that it would delay the announcement of its final rankings and matchups for the Rose Bowl and Sugar Bowl from December 6 to December 20, to accommodate conferences that had delayed their championship games to mid-December. The CFP announced that it would still go on as scheduled, with only the teams playing in the fall being eligible for consideration in its rankings.

The voting deadline for the Heisman Trophy was similarly pushed back to December 21, with the presentation likewise scheduled for January 5, 2021. On November 14, the in-person presentation was canceled (its previous site, the PlayStation Theater in New York City, had also closed at the beginning of the year). The presentation was moved to ESPN's studio in Bristol, Connecticut, scheduled as a television-only event with finalists and past winners appearing via remote interviews.

Several bowl games were canceled due to the pandemic, while others, including the Fiesta Bowl and Rose Bowl, were restricted to being played behind closed doors without fans due to local health orders. On December 19, the Pasadena Tournament of Roses Association announced that the Rose Bowl would be re-located to AT&T Stadium in Arlington, Texas (typically the host of the Cotton Bowl Classic), citing rising cases in the state of California, and state health officials denying a request to allow at least the family members of players to attend. Special permission was required from the city of Pasadena to use the Rose Bowl name, with the Tournament of Roses Association paying $2 million to the city to compensate for lost revenue and other expenses.

=== Player responses ===
Several players from the Pac-12 announced a unity group titled #WeAreUnited to negotiate with the conference and league with specific demands in regards to the 2020 football season. Some players were willing to boycott if their ultimatum was not satisfied. Players from the Big Ten created a similar unity which called for increase in testing and safety protocols.

Clemson quarterback Trevor Lawrence sparked a trend on Twitter with the hashtag #WeWantToPlay, on August 9. Other players such as Justin Fields (Ohio State), Najee Harris (Alabama), and Chuba Hubbard (Oklahoma State) posted to help contribute to make the hashtag No. 1 on Twitter in the United States. Donald Trump shared Lawrence's tweet, stating "The student-athletes have been working too hard for their season to be cancelled." as well using the #WeWantToPlay hashtag. Later #WeAreUnited and #WeWantToPlay merged with players across the Power 5, with the goal of creating a union. Nick Saban, Jim Harbaugh and Ryan Day joined the movement, stating that players would be safer from the virus together as a team than at home.

Eight Nebraska players sued the Big Ten in late August 2020, claiming that the conference's council did not vote on postponing the football season.

=== Teams opting out ===
Four teams opted out of their 2020 Fall football seasons as a result of the COVID-19 pandemic.

Team	Conference	Notes
UConn Huskies	Independent	UConn canceled their 2020 season
UMass Minutemen	Independent	Reversed the decision to opt out of fall football (Note: UMass initially announced that they would opt out of playing fall football and hoped to construct a season in spring 2021, but the university reversed the decision in late September and announced its intention to play beginning in mid-October.)
New Mexico State Aggies	Independent	Opted out of playing fall football to play in spring 2021
Old Dominion Monarchs	Conference USA	Old Dominion canceled their 2020 season

=== Attendance restrictions ===
Some teams announced that they tentatively planned to allow spectators at their games at a percentage of normal capacity, such as the Texas Longhorns (Darrell K Royal-Texas Memorial Stadium was already to have slightly reduced capacity this season due to renovations) and the North Carolina Tar Heels. All events held in the state of New York, as well as all Big Ten and Pac-12 games, were played behind closed doors. The Big Ten and Pac-12 bans applied even if spectators were otherwise allowed under local health orders.

The Army Black Knights and Navy Midshipmens' home games were closed to the public, with attendance limited to their cadets and midshipmen respectively. On October 23, it was announced that the Army–Navy Game would be re-located from Philadelphia's Lincoln Financial Field to Michie Stadium—the Black Knights' home stadium at the U.S. Military Academy in West Point—citing Pennsylvania state restrictions on gatherings that would prevent the cadets and midshipmen from attending. As with their home games, attendance was limited to the academies' student bodies. It marked the first Army-Navy Game not played at a neutral site since 1943.

=== Postponed or canceled games ===
Week	Game	Make-up		Notes
Week	Game	Date	Week	Notes
Week 1	Louisiana–Monroe at Troy	December 17, 2020	Week 14	
Week 1	Jacksonville State at FIU	October 23, 2020	Week 8	
Week 1	Rice at Houston	Canceled		
Week 2	Tulsa at Oklahoma State	September 19, 2020	Week 3	
Week 2	NC State at Virginia Tech	September 26, 2020	Week 4	
Week 2	SMU at TCU	Canceled		
Week 2	FIU at No. 21 UCF	Canceled		
Week 2	Marshall at East Carolina	Canceled		
Week 2	Louisiana Tech at Baylor	Canceled		
Week 3	Charlotte at North Carolina	Canceled		
Week 3	No. 21 BYU at No. 22 Army	Canceled		
Week 3	Houston at Memphis	December 12, 2020	Week 15	
Week 3	Houston at Baylor	Canceled		
Week 3	Florida Atlantic at Georgia Southern	December 5, 2020	Week 14	
Week 3	Central Arkansas at Arkansas State	October 10, 2020	Week 6	
Week 4	No. 7 Notre Dame at Wake Forest	Canceled		
Week 4	Georgia State at Charlotte	Canceled		
Week 4	Tulsa at Arkansas State	Canceled		
Week 4	South Florida at Florida Atlantic	Canceled		
Week 4	North Texas at Houston	Canceled		
Week 5	Rice at Marshall	December 5, 2020	Week 14	
Week 5	Troy at South Alabama	December 5, 2020	Week 14	
Week 6	Florida Atlantic at Southern Miss	December 10, 2020	Week 15	
Week 6	UAB at Rice	December 12, 2020	Week 15	
Week 7	No. 7 Oklahoma State at Baylor	December 12, 2020	Week 15	
Week 7	No. 8 Cincinnati at Tulsa	Canceled		
Week 7	LSU at No. 10 Florida	December 12, 2020	Week 15	
Week 7	Southern Miss at UTEP	Canceled		
Week 7	Vanderbilt at Missouri	November 28, 2020	Week 15	
Week 7	FIU at Charlotte	Canceled		
Week 8	New Mexico at Colorado State	Canceled		
Week 9	No. 19 Marshall at FIU	Canceled		
Week 9	No. 9 Wisconsin at Nebraska	Canceled		
Week 9	North Texas at UTEP	December 11, 2020	Week 15	
Week 10	Purdue at No. 10 Wisconsin	Canceled		
Week 10	Air Force at Army	December 19, 2020	Week 16	
Week 10	Tulsa at Navy	December 5, 2020	Week 14	
Week 10	UTSA at Rice	Canceled		
Week 10	Charlotte at Middle Tennessee	Canceled		
Week 10	Arizona at Utah	Canceled		
Week 10	FIU at UTEP	Canceled		
Week 10	Louisiana Tech at North Texas	December 3, 2020	Week 14	
Week 10	Louisville at Virginia	November 14, 2020	Week 11	
Week 10	Washington at California	Canceled		
Week 11	Air Force at Wyoming	Canceled		
Week 11	No. 1 Alabama at LSU	December 5, 2020	Week 14	
Week 11	No. 5 Texas A&M at Tennessee	December 19, 2020	Week 16	
Week 11	No. 12 Georgia at Missouri	December 12, 2020	Week 15	
Week 11	No. 24 Auburn at Mississippi State	December 12, 2020	Week 15	
Week 11	Memphis at Navy	November 28, 2020	Week 13	
Week 11	Louisiana–Monroe at Arkansas State	December 5, 2020	Week 15	
Week 11	No. 3 Ohio State at Maryland	Canceled		
Week 11	Rice at Louisiana Tech	Canceled		
Week 11	Pittsburgh at Georgia Tech	December 10, 2020	Week 15	
Week 11	No. 15 Coastal Carolina at Troy	December 12, 2020	Week 15	
Week 11	California at Arizona State	Canceled		As a make-up game, Cal and UCLA were rescheduled to play on November 15 at the Rose Bowl, for the 91st meeting in the California–UCLA football rivalry, not originally scheduled for the shortened Pac-12 season.
Week 11	Utah at UCLA	Canceled		As a make-up game, Cal and UCLA were rescheduled to play on November 15 at the Rose Bowl, for the 91st meeting in the California–UCLA football rivalry, not originally scheduled for the shortened Pac-12 season.
Week 11	Gardner–Webb at Charlotte	Canceled		
Week 12	UAB at UTEP	Canceled		
Week 12	Ohio at Miami (OH)	Canceled		
Week 12	Arizona State at Colorado	Canceled		
Week 12	Georgia Tech at No. 12 Miami (FL)	December 19, 2020	Week 16	
Week 12	Charlotte at No. 15 Marshall	Canceled		
Week 12	Ole Miss at No. 5 Texas A&M	Canceled		
Week 12	Louisiana–Monroe at Louisiana Tech	Canceled		
Week 12	Wake Forest at Duke	Canceled		
Week 12	Utah State at Wyoming	Canceled		
Week 12	Central Arkansas at No. 24 Louisiana	Canceled		
Week 12	Navy at South Florida	Canceled		
Week 12	Houston at SMU	Canceled		
Week 12	No. 22 Texas at Kansas	Canceled		
Week 12	UNLV at Colorado State	Canceled		
Week 12	Michigan State at Maryland	Canceled		
Week 12	Washington State at Stanford	Canceled		
Week 12	San Jose State at Fresno State	Canceled		
Week 12	No. 4 Clemson at Florida State	Canceled		
Week 13	Utah at Arizona State	Canceled		Utah and Washington were subsequently scheduled to play on November 28 at Husky Stadium, not originally scheduled for the shortened Pac-12 season.
Week 13	Washington at Washington State	Canceled		Utah and Washington were subsequently scheduled to play on November 28 at Husky Stadium, not originally scheduled for the shortened Pac-12 season.
Week 13	Louisiana Tech at FIU	Canceled		
Week 13	No. 25 Tulsa at Houston	Canceled		
Week 13	Minnesota at No. 16 Wisconsin	December 19, 2020	Week 16	Had the makeup game not occurred, this rivalry game would have been canceled for the first time since 1906.
Week 13	Southern Miss at UAB	Canceled		
Week 13	No. 11 Oklahoma at West Virginia	Canceled		
Week 13	No. 7 Cincinnati at Temple	Canceled		
Week 13	Colorado State at Air Force	Canceled		
Week 13	San Diego State at Fresno State	Canceled		San Diego State and Colorado were subsequently scheduled to play an inter-conference game on November 28 at Folsom Field, not originally scheduled for either team.
Week 13	Colorado at No. 18 USC	Canceled		San Diego State and Colorado were subsequently scheduled to play an inter-conference game on November 28 at Folsom Field, not originally scheduled for either team.
Week 13	No. 4 Ohio State at Illinois	Canceled		
Week 13	Florida Atlantic at Middle Tennessee	Canceled		
Week 13	Virginia at Florida State	Canceled		
Week 13	San Jose State at Boise State	Canceled		
Week 13	UTEP at Rice	Canceled		
Week 13	Western Kentucky at Charlotte	December 6, 2020	Week 14	
Week 14	Southern Miss at UTEP	Canceled		
Week 14	No. 10 Miami (FL) at Wake Forest	Canceled		Miami (FL) and Duke were subsequently scheduled to play on December 5 at Wallace Wade Stadium, it was not originally scheduled for either team.
Week 14	Florida State at Duke	Canceled		Miami (FL) and Duke were subsequently scheduled to play on December 5 at Wallace Wade Stadium, it was not originally scheduled for either team.
Week 14	No. 14 Northwestern at Minnesota	Canceled		
Week 14	Kent State at Miami (OH)	Canceled		
Week 14	Maryland at Michigan	Canceled		
Week 14	Boise State at UNLV	Canceled		
Week 14	Liberty at No. 18 Coastal Carolina	Canceled		BYU, ranked No. 13 in this week's CFP rankings, took Liberty's place as Coastal Carolina's opponent.
Week 14	Houston at SMU	Canceled		
Week 14	Vanderbilt at No. 8 Georgia	December 19, 2020	Week 16	
Week 14	FIU at Charlotte	Canceled		The Western Kentucky at Charlotte game originally scheduled for last week but canceled due to COVID-19 was rescheduled for Sunday of this week.
Week 14	Buffalo at Ohio	Canceled		
Week 14	UAB at Middle Tennessee	Canceled		
Week 15	No. 8 Cincinnati at No. 24 Tulsa	Canceled		
Week 15	Ole Miss at No. 5 Texas A&M	Canceled		
Week 15	Michigan at No. 4 Ohio State	Canceled		The Michigan–Ohio State rivalry game was not played for the first time since 1917.
Week 15	Ohio at Kent State	Canceled		
Week 15	Charlotte at Marshall	Canceled		
Week 15	Purdue at No. 12 Indiana	Canceled		
Week 15	No. 11 Oklahoma at West Virginia	Canceled		
Week 15	Texas at Kansas	Canceled		
Week 15	Miami (OH) at Bowling Green	Canceled		
Week 15	Incarnate Word at Arkansas State	Canceled		
Week 15	Washington at Oregon	Canceled		
Week 15	Utah State at Colorado State	Canceled		This is the only game on this list not scrapped due to COVID-19. Instead, this ensued when the USU team would not travel to Fort Collins in protest of racially insensitive conditions on campus and the football team.
Week 15	California at Washington State	Canceled		
Week 16	Georgia Tech at No. 18 Miami (FL)	Canceled		
Week 16	Arizona at California	Canceled		
Week 16	Louisiana–Monroe at Troy	Canceled		
Week 16	Vanderbilt at No. 8 Georgia	Canceled		
Week 16	Oregon at Colorado	Canceled		Oregon took Washington's place as USC's opponent in the Pac-12 Championship game.
Week 16	Purdue at No. 11 Indiana	Canceled		The Old Oaken Bucket game was not played for the first time since 1919.
Week 16	Michigan at No. 16 Iowa	Canceled		
Week 16	Michigan State at Maryland	Canceled		
Week 16	No. 19 Louisiana at No. 12 Coastal Carolina	Canceled		This game, the Sun Belt Conference Football Championship Game, was the only conference championship game to be canceled. The Sun Belt announced that both schools would be co-champions.
Week 16	Florida State at Wake Forest	Canceled		

== Stadiums ==
=== Upcoming ===
- The 2020 season was the first for South Alabama at Hancock Whitney Stadium replacing Ladd–Peebles Stadium. The team was scheduled to play its first game there on September 12 against Grambling State. The Senior Bowl postseason all-star game (which had been played at Ladd–Peebles) also moved to the new stadium for this season's edition in January 2021.
- The 2020 season was the last season for UAB at Legion Field before moving to Protective Stadium on the grounds of the Birmingham–Jefferson Convention Complex in 2021. The Blazers played their final game at Legion Field on October 23 against Louisiana.
- The 2020 season was the first for UNLV at Allegiant Stadium, replacing Sam Boyd Stadium. The team was scheduled to play its first game there on August 29 against California.

=== Renamed ===
- Georgia State renamed their stadium to Center Parc Stadium in a naming rights agreement with the Atlanta Postal Credit Union.
- UCF renamed their stadium to Bounce House. Their previous naming rights deal with Charter Spectrum expired after the 2019 season. A potential naming rights deal with RoofClaim.com was vetoed by the Florida Legislature.

== Kickoff games ==
All kickoff games were canceled due to the COVID-19 pandemic.

=== "Week Zero" ===
The regular season was scheduled to begin on August 29 with various "Week 0" games, but all were canceled due to the COVID-19 pandemic. There were two especially notable Week Zero games:

Originally, Marshall was set to play at East Carolina, to honor the 50th anniversary of the plane crash that killed 75 people, including 37 from the Marshall University football team. The crash occurred as the Thundering Herd were returning from a game at East Carolina.

Additionally, the Emerald Isle Classic at Aviva Stadium in Dublin, Ireland was scheduled to occur during Week 0, featuring Navy versus Notre Dame. However, on June 2, 2020, the game was moved from Dublin to Navy–Marine Corps Memorial Stadium in Annapolis, Maryland. Eventually, the game was canceled altogether. The game would have been the first in the history of the Navy–Notre Dame football rivalry to be played at Navy's home stadium. The series was also canceled in 2021 and returned in 2022.

=== Week 1 ===
The majority of FBS teams were scheduled to open the season on Labor Day weekend. However, most conferences delayed the start of their seasons due to the COVID-19 pandemic. For example, the ACC and Big 12 conferences were scheduled to begin play the weekend of September 12, while the SEC conference began conference-only play the weekend of September 26.

Four neutral-site "kickoff" games were scheduled to be held but were also canceled.

- Texas Kickoff (NRG Stadium, Houston): Baylor vs. Ole Miss
- Chick-fil-A Kickoff Games (Mercedes-Benz Stadium, Atlanta):
  - Florida State vs. West Virginia
  - Georgia vs. Virginia
- Advocare Classic (AT&T Stadium, Arlington): Alabama vs. USC

=== Week 2 ===
- Chick-fil-A Kickoff Game (Mercedes-Benz Stadium, Atlanta): Auburn vs. North Carolina

== Regular season top 10 matchups ==
Rankings reflect the AP Poll. Rankings for Week 13 and beyond are listed College Football Playoff Rankings first and AP Poll second. Teams that failed to be a top 10 team for one poll or the other will be noted.

- Week 5
  - No. 4 Georgia defeated No. 7 Auburn, 27–6 (Sanford Stadium, Athens, Georgia)
- Week 6
  - No. 1 Clemson defeated No. 7 Miami (FL), 42–17 (Memorial Stadium, Clemson, South Carolina)
- Week 7
  - No. 2 Alabama defeated No. 3 Georgia, 41–24 (Bryant–Denny Stadium, Tuscaloosa, Alabama)
- Week 10
  - No. 4 Notre Dame defeated No. 1 Clemson, 47–40, 2OT (Notre Dame Stadium, South Bend, Indiana)
  - No. 8 Florida defeated No. 5 Georgia, 44–28 (TIAA Bank Field, Jacksonville, Florida)
- Week 12
  - No. 3 Ohio State defeated No. 9 Indiana, 42–35 (Ohio Stadium, Columbus, Ohio)
- Week 15
  - No. 1/1 Alabama defeated No. 7/11 Florida, 52–46 (2020 SEC Championship Game, Mercedes–Benz Stadium, Atlanta, Georgia)
  - No. 3/4 Clemson defeated No. 2/2 Notre Dame, 34–10 (2020 ACC Championship Game, Bank of America Stadium, Charlotte, North Carolina)
  - No. 10/12 Oklahoma defeated No. 6/8 Iowa State, 27–21 (2020 Big 12 Championship Game, AT&T Stadium, Arlington, Texas)

== Upsets ==
This section lists instances of unranked teams defeating ranked teams during the season.

=== Regular season ===
During the regular season, 33 unranked teams defeated a ranked team. The highest-ranked teams that lost to an unranked opponent were No. 3 Oklahoma in week 4 and No. 5 North Carolina in week 7. Rankings are based on the AP Poll at the time the game was played.

Unranked teams who defeated ranked teams
Week	Winning Team		Losing Team	
Week 2	Louisiana	31	No. 23 Iowa State	14
Week 3	Marshall	17	No. 23 Appalachian State	7
Week 4	Kansas State	38	No. 3 Oklahoma	35
Week 4	Mississippi State	44	No. 6 LSU	34
Week 5	TCU	33	No. 9 Texas	31
Week 5	Tulsa	34	No. 11 UCF	26
Week 5	Arkansas	21	No. 16 Mississippi State	14
Week 5	Iowa State	37	No. 18 Oklahoma	30
Week 5	NC State	30	No. 24 Pittsburgh	29
Week 5	SMU	30	No. 25 Memphis	27
Week 6	Missouri	45	No. 17 LSU	41
Week 6	Oklahoma (4OT)	53	No. 22 Texas	45
Week 7	Florida State	31	No. 5 North Carolina	28
Week 7	South Carolina	30	No. 15 Auburn	22
Week 7	Kentucky	34	No. 18 Tennessee	7
Week 7	Coastal Carolina	30	No. 21 Louisiana	27
Week 8	Indiana (OT)	36	No. 8 Penn State	35
Week 8	Wake Forest	23	No. 19 Virginia Tech	16
Week 9	Texas (OT)	41	No. 6 Oklahoma State	34
Week 9	Michigan State	27	No. 13 Michigan	24
Week 9	Virginia	44	No. 15 North Carolina	41
Week 9	West Virginia	37	No. 16 Kansas State	10
Week 11	Tulsa	28	No. 19 SMU	24
Week 12	NC State	15	No. 21 Liberty	14
Week 13	Michigan State	29	No. 8 Northwestern	20
Week 13	Oregon State	41	No. 15 Oregon	38
Week 14	TCU	29	No. 15 Oklahoma State	22
Week 14	Rice	20	No. 21 Marshall	0
Week 14	Stanford	31	No. 22 Washington	26
Week 14	California	21	No. 23 Oregon	17
Week 15	LSU	37	No. 6 Florida	34
Week 15	Utah	38	No. 21 Colorado	21
Week 16	Oregon	31	No. 13 USC	24

=== Bowl games ===
During the bowl season, five unranked teams defeated a ranked team. Rankings in this section are based on the final CFP rankings released on December 20.

Unranked teams who defeated ranked teams
Bowl	Winning Team		Losing Team	
Cure Bowl	Liberty	37	No. 12 Coastal Carolina	34
Armed Forces Bowl	Mississippi State	28	No. 24 Tulsa	26
Arizona Bowl	Ball State	34	No. 22 San Jose State	16
Gator Bowl	Kentucky	23	No. 23 NC State	21
Outback Bowl	Ole Miss	26	No. 11 Indiana	20

== FCS team wins over FBS teams ==
Italics denotes FCS teams.

Date	Visiting team	Home team	Site	Result	Attendance	Ref.
October 23	Jacksonville State	FIU	Riccardo Silva Stadium • Miami, Florida	19–10	1,041	
February 21, 2021	Tarleton State	New Mexico State	Sun Bowl • El Paso, Texas	43–17	0	
^{#}Rankings from AP Poll released prior to game.

== Conference standings ==
2020 American Athletic Conference football standings
	Conf.			Overall
Team	W		L	W		L
No. 8 Cincinnati y$	6	–	0	9	–	1
Tulsa y	6	–	0	6	–	3
Memphis	5	–	3	8	–	3
UCF	5	–	3	6	–	4
SMU	4	–	3	7	–	3
Houston	3	–	3	3	–	5
Navy	3	–	4	3	–	7
Tulane	3	–	5	6	–	6
East Carolina	3	–	5	3	–	6
Temple	1	–	6	1	–	6
South Florida	0	–	7	1	–	8
Championship: Cincinnati 27, Tulsa 24
$ – Conference champion; y – Championship game participant; Rankings from AP Poll.

2020 Atlantic Coast Conference football standings
	Conf.			Overall
Team	W		L	W		L
No. 5 Notre Dame y^	9	–	0	10	–	2
No. 3 Clemson y$^	8	–	1	10	–	2
No. 22 Miami (FL)	7	–	2	8	–	3
No. 18 North Carolina	7	–	3	8	–	4
NC State	7	–	3	8	–	4
Boston College	5	–	5	6	–	5
Pittsburgh	5	–	5	6	–	5
Virginia Tech	5	–	5	5	–	6
Virginia	4	–	5	5	–	5
Wake Forest	3	–	4	4	–	5
Georgia Tech	3	–	6	3	–	7
Louisville	3	–	7	4	–	7
Florida State	2	–	6	3	–	6
Duke	1	–	9	2	–	9
Syracuse	1	–	9	1	–	10
Championship: Clemson 34, Notre Dame 10
^ – College Football Playoff participant; $ – Conference champion; y – Championship game participant; Rankings from AP Poll.

2020 Big Ten Conference football standings
	Conf.			Overall
Team	W		L	W		L
East Division
No. 2 Ohio State xy$^	5	–	0	7	–	1
No. 12 Indiana	6	–	1	6	–	2
Penn State	4	–	5	4	–	5
Maryland	2	–	3	2	–	3
Rutgers	3	–	6	3	–	6
Michigan	2	–	4	2	–	4
Michigan State	2	–	5	2	–	5
West Division
No. 10 Northwestern xy	6	–	1	7	–	2
No. 16 Iowa	6	–	2	6	–	2
Wisconsin	3	–	3	4	–	3
Minnesota	3	–	4	3	–	4
Nebraska	3	–	5	3	–	5
Purdue	2	–	4	2	–	4
Illinois	2	–	6	2	–	6
Championship: Ohio State 22, Northwestern 10
^ – College Football Playoff participant; $ – Conference champion; x – Division champion/co-champions; y – Championship game participant; Note: Due to COVID-19, the Big Ten suspended the season on August 11, but later decided to begin play on October 24. In addition to the title game that was played on December 19, the conference seeded all remaining teams for "championship week" games.; Rankings from AP Poll.

2020 Big 12 Conference football standings
	Conf.			Overall
Team	W		L	W		L
No. 9 Iowa State y	8	–	1	9	–	3
No. 6 Oklahoma y$	6	–	2	9	–	2
No. 20 Oklahoma State	6	–	3	8	–	3
No. 19 Texas	5	–	3	7	–	3
TCU	5	–	4	6	–	4
West Virginia	4	–	4	6	–	4
Kansas State	4	–	5	4	–	6
Texas Tech	3	–	6	4	–	6
Baylor	2	–	7	2	–	7
Kansas	0	–	8	0	–	9
Championship: Oklahoma 27, Iowa State 21
$ – Conference champion; y – Championship game participant; Rankings from AP Poll.

2020 Conference USA football standings
	Conf.			Overall
Team	W		L	W		L
East Division
Marshall xy	4	–	1	7	–	3
Florida Atlantic	4	–	2	5	–	4
Western Kentucky	4	–	3	5	–	7
Charlotte	2	–	2	2	–	4
Middle Tennessee	2	–	4	3	–	6
FIU	0	–	3	0	–	5
West Division
UAB xy$	3	–	1	6	–	3
UTSA	5	–	2	7	–	5
Louisiana Tech	4	–	2	5	–	5
North Texas	3	–	4	4	–	6
Rice	2	–	3	2	–	3
Southern Miss	2	–	4	3	–	7
UTEP	0	–	4	3	–	5
Championship: UAB 22, Marshall 13
$ – Conference champion; x – Division champion/co-champions; y – Championship game participant; Note: Due to COVID-19, Old Dominion opted out of the season.

2020 Mid-American Conference football standings
	Conf.			Overall
Team	W		L	W		L
East Division
No. 25 Buffalo xy	5	–	0	6	–	1
Kent State	3	–	1	3	–	1
Ohio	2	–	1	2	–	1
Miami (OH)	2	–	1	2	–	1
Akron	1	–	5	1	–	5
Bowling Green	0	–	5	0	–	5
West Division
No. 23 Ball State xy$	5	–	1	7	–	1
Western Michigan	4	–	2	4	–	2
Toledo	4	–	2	4	–	2
Central Michigan	3	–	3	3	–	3
Eastern Michigan	2	–	4	2	–	4
Northern Illinois	0	–	6	0	–	6
Championship: Ball State 38, Buffalo 28
$ – Conference champion; x – Division champion/co-champions; y – Championship game participant; Note: Due to COVID-19, the Mid-American suspended the season on August 8, but later decided to begin play on November 4.; Rankings from AP Poll.

2020 Mountain West Conference football standings
	Conf.			Overall
Team	W		L	W		L
No. 24 San Jose State y$	6	–	0	7	–	1
Boise State y	5	–	0	5	–	2
Nevada	6	–	2	7	–	2
San Diego State	4	–	2	4	–	4
Hawaii	4	–	4	5	–	4
Fresno State	3	–	3	3	–	3
Air Force	2	–	2	3	–	3
Wyoming	2	–	4	2	–	4
New Mexico	2	–	5	2	–	5
Colorado State	1	–	3	1	–	3
Utah State	1	–	5	1	–	5
UNLV	0	–	6	0	–	6
Championship: San Jose State 34, Boise State 20
$ – Conference champion; y – Championship game participant; Note: Due to COVID-19, the Mountain West suspended the season, but later decided to begin play on October 24.; Rankings from AP Poll

2020 Pac-12 Conference football standings
	Conf.			Overall
Team	W		L	W		L
North Division
Washington x	3	–	1	3	–	1
Oregon y$	3	–	2	4	–	3
Stanford	4	–	2	4	–	2
California	1	–	3	1	–	3
Washington State	1	–	3	1	–	3
Oregon State	2	–	5	2	–	5
South Division
No. 21 USC xy	5	–	0	5	–	1
Colorado	3	–	1	4	–	2
Utah	3	–	2	3	–	2
Arizona State	2	–	2	2	–	2
UCLA	3	–	4	3	–	4
Arizona	0	–	5	0	–	5
Championship: Oregon 31, USC 24
$ – Conference champion; x – Division champion/co-champions; y – Championship game participant; Note: Due to COVID-19, the Pac-12 suspended the season on August 11, but later decided to begin play on November 6. In addition to the title game on December 18, the conference seeded all remaining teams for a game during that weekend.; Rankings from AP Poll.

2020 Southeastern Conference football standings
	Conf.			Overall
Team	W		L	W		L
Eastern Division
No. 13 Florida x	8	–	2	8	–	4
No. 7 Georgia	7	–	2	8	–	2
Missouri	5	–	5	5	–	5
Kentucky	4	–	6	5	–	6
Tennessee*	3	–	7	3	–	7
South Carolina	2	–	8	2	–	8
Vanderbilt	0	–	9	0	–	9
Western Division
No. 1 Alabama x$#^	10	–	0	13	–	0
No. 4 Texas A&M	8	–	1	9	–	1
Auburn	6	–	4	6	–	5
LSU*	5	–	5	5	–	5
Ole Miss	4	–	5	5	–	5
Arkansas	3	–	7	3	–	7
Mississippi State	3	–	7	4	–	7
Championship: Alabama 52, Florida 46
# – College Football Playoff champion; ^ – College Football Playoff participant; $ – Conference champion; x – Division champion/co-champions; * – Tennessee vacated all wins due to NCAA violations. LSU was ineligible for postseason due to self imposed ban. Note: Due to COVID-19, the SEC played a conference-only schedule.; Rankings from AP Poll.

2020 Sun Belt Conference football standings
	Conf.			Overall
Team	W		L	W		L
East Division
No. 14 Coastal Carolina xy+	8	–	0	11	–	1
Appalachian State	6	–	2	9	–	3
Georgia Southern	4	–	4	8	–	5
Georgia State	4	–	4	6	–	4
Troy	3	–	4	5	–	6
West Division
No. 15 Louisiana xy+	7	–	1	10	–	1
South Alabama	3	–	5	4	–	7
Arkansas State	2	–	6	4	–	7
Texas State	2	–	6	2	–	10
Louisiana–Monroe	0	–	7	0	–	10
Championship: Louisiana at Coastal Carolina (Canceled)
+ – Conference co-champions; x – Division champion/co-champions; y – Championship game participant; Rankings from AP Poll

2020 NCAA Division I FBS independents football records
	Conf.			Overall
Team	W		L	W		L
No. 11 BYU		–		11	–	1
No. 17 Liberty		–		10	–	1
Army		–		9	–	3
New Mexico State		–		1	–	1
UMass		–		0	–	4
Note: Due to COVID-19, UConn canceled the 2020 football season; New Mexico State was the only FBS school to play a spring schedule.; Rankings from AP Poll.

== Conference summaries ==
Conference	Championship game			Overall Player of the Year/MVP	Offensive Player of the Year	Defensive Player of the Year	Coach of the Year
Conference	Champion	Score	Runner-up	Overall Player of the Year/MVP	Offensive Player of the Year	Defensive Player of the Year	Coach of the Year
ACC	No. 3 Clemson (9–1) ^{CFP}	34–10	No. 2 Notre Dame (10–0) ^{CFP}	Trevor Lawrence, QB, Clemson	Trevor Lawrence, QB, Clemson	Jeremiah Owusu-Koramoah, LB, Notre Dame	Brian Kelly, HC, Notre Dame
American	No. 9 Cincinnati (8–0)	27–24	No. 23 Tulsa (6–1)	—N/a (Note: Not awarded by this conference.)	Desmond Ridder, QB, Cincinnati	Zaven Collins, LB, Tulsa	Luke Fickell, HC, Cincinnati
Big Ten	No. 4 Ohio State (5–0) ^{CFP}	22–10	No. 14 Northwestern (6–1)	—N/a	Justin Fields, QB, Ohio State	Daviyon Nixon, DT, Iowa	Tom Allen, HC, Indiana
Big 12	No. 10 Oklahoma (11–2)	27–21	No. 6 Iowa State (8–2)	—N/a	Breece Hall, RB, Iowa State	Mike Rose, LB, Iowa State	Matt Campbell, HC, Iowa State
C–USA	UAB (5–3)	22–13	Marshall (7–1)	Jaelon Darden, WR, North Texas	Sincere McCormick, RB, UTSA	Tavante Beckett, LB, Marshall	Doc Holliday, HC, Marshall
MAC	Ball State (5–1)	38–28	Buffalo (5–0)	Jaret Patterson, RB, Buffalo	Jaret Patterson, RB, Buffalo	Troy Hairston, DL, Central Michigan; Brandon Martin, LB, Ball State	Lance Leipold, HC, Buffalo
MWC	No. 24 San Jose State (6–0)	34–20	Boise State (5–1)	—N/a	Carson Strong, QB, Nevada	Cade Hall, DL, San Jose State	Brent Brennan, HC, San Jose State
Pac-12	Oregon (3–2)	31–24	No. 13 USC (5–0)	—N/a	Jarek Broussard, RB, Colorado	Talanoa Hufanga, S, USC	Karl Dorrell, HC, Colorado
SEC	No. 1 Alabama (10–0) ^{CFP}	52–46	No. 7 Florida (8–2)	—N/a	DeVonta Smith, WR, Alabama	Patrick Surtain II, DB, Alabama	Nick Saban, HC, Alabama
Sun Belt	No. 12 Coastal Carolina (11–0); No. 19 Louisiana (9–1)	Canc. (Note: The Sun Belt Conference championship game was canceled, and both teams were declared co-champions.)	—N/a	Grayson McCall, QB, Coastal Carolina	Jonathan Adams, WR, Arkansas State	Tarron Jackson, DL, Coastal Carolina	Jamey Chadwell, HC, Coastal Carolina

^{CFP} College Football Playoff participant

== Rankings ==
The top 25 from the AP and USA Today Coaches Polls.

=== Pre-season polls ===
AP
Ranking	Team
1	Clemson (38)
2	Ohio State (21)
3	Alabama (2)
4	Georgia
5	Oklahoma
6	LSU (1)
7	Penn State
8	Florida
9	Oregon
10	Notre Dame
11	Auburn
12	Wisconsin
13	Texas A&M
14	Texas
15	Oklahoma State
16	Michigan
17	USC
18	North Carolina
19	Minnesota
20	Cincinnati
21	UCF
22	Utah
23	Iowa State
24	Iowa
25	Tennessee

USA Today Coaches
Ranking	Team
1	Clemson (38)
2	Ohio State (17)
3	Alabama (4)
4	Georgia
5	LSU
6	Oklahoma
7	Penn State
8	Florida
9	Oregon
10	Notre Dame
11	Auburn
12	Wisconsin
13	Texas A&M
14	Texas
15	Michigan
16	Oklahoma State
17	USC
18	Minnesota
19	North Carolina
20	Utah
21	UCF
22	Cincinnati
23	Iowa
24	Virginia Tech
25	Iowa State

=== CFB Playoff final rankings ===
In December 2020, the College Football Playoff selection committee will announce its final team rankings for the year.

Rank	Team	W–L	Conference and standing	Bowl game
1	Alabama	11–0	SEC champion	Rose Bowl
2	Clemson	10–1	ACC champion	Sugar Bowl
3	Ohio State	6–0	Big Ten champion	Sugar Bowl
4	Notre Dame	10–1	ACC runner-up	Rose Bowl
5	Texas A&M	8–1	SEC West 2nd place	Orange Bowl
6	Oklahoma	8–2	Big 12 champion	Cotton Bowl
7	Florida	8–3	SEC runner-up	Cotton Bowl
8	Cincinnati	9–0	AAC champion	Peach Bowl
9	Georgia	7–2	SEC East 2nd place	Peach Bowl
10	Iowa State	8–3	Big 12 runner-up	Fiesta Bowl
11	Indiana	6–1	Big Ten East 2nd place	Outback Bowl
12	Coastal Carolina	11–0	Sun Belt co-champion	Cure Bowl
13	North Carolina	8–3	ACC 3rd place	Orange Bowl
14	Northwestern	6–1	Big Ten runner-up	Citrus Bowl
15	Iowa	6–2	Big Ten West 2nd place	~~Music City Bowl~~
16	BYU	10–1	Independent	Boca Raton Bowl
17	USC	5–1	Pac-12 runner-up	N/A
18	Miami (FL)	8–2	ACC 4th place	Cheez-It Bowl
19	Louisiana	9–1	Sun Belt co-champions	First Responder Bowl
20	Texas	6–3	Big 12 4th place	Alamo Bowl
21	Oklahoma State	7–3	Big 12 3rd place	Cheez-It Bowl
22	San Jose State	7–0	Mountain West champion	Arizona Bowl
23	NC State	8–3	ACC 5th place	Gator Bowl
24	Tulsa	6–1	AAC runner-up	Armed Forces Bowl
25	Oregon	4–2	Pac-12 champion	Fiesta Bowl

=== Final rankings ===
Rank	Associated Press	Coaches' Poll
1	Alabama (13–0)	Alabama (13–0)
2	Ohio State (7–1)	Ohio State (7–1)
3	Clemson (10–2)	Clemson (10–2)
4	Texas A&M (9–1)	Texas A&M (9–1)
5	Notre Dame (10–2)	Notre Dame (10–2)
6	Oklahoma (9–2)	Oklahoma (9–2)
7	Georgia (8–2)	Georgia (8–2)
8	Cincinnati (9–1)	Cincinnati (9–1)
9	Iowa State (9–3)	Iowa State (9–3)
10	Northwestern (7–2)	Northwestern (7–2)
11	BYU (11–1)	BYU (11–1)
12	Indiana (6–2)	Florida (8–4)
13	Florida (8–4)	Indiana (6–2)
14	Coastal Carolina (11–1)	Coastal Carolina (11–1)
15	Louisiana (10–1)	Iowa (6–2)
16	Iowa (6–2)	Louisiana (10–1)
17	Liberty (10–1)	North Carolina (8–4)
18	North Carolina (8–4)	Liberty (10–1)
19	Texas (7–3)	Oklahoma State (8–3)
20	Oklahoma State (8–3)	Texas (7–3)
21	USC (5–1)	USC (5–1)
22	Miami (FL) (8–3)	Miami (FL) (8–3)
23	Ball State (7–1)	Ball State (7–1)
24	San Jose State (7–1)	San Jose State (7–1)
25	Buffalo (6–1)	Buffalo (6–1)

== Postseason ==
The NCAA waived bowl eligibility requirements for the 2020–21 bowl season, intended "to allow as many student-athletes as possible the opportunity to participate in bowl games this year." On October 30, the postseason lineup of bowl games was announced; 37 bowls were scheduled, including the National Championship game. Subsequent cancellations resulted in a schedule of 33 games, as compared to 40 games contested during the prior bowl season. On December 20, after the final CFP standings were released, an additional four games were left without teams available to play, leaving the count at 29. On December 22, the Gasparilla Bowl was canceled after the South Carolina team had an increase in COVID-19 cases. On December 27, the Music City Bowl was canceled due to Missouri's high positive COVID-19 numbers. On December 29, the Texas Bowl was canceled due to TCU's COVID-19 issues.

2019–20 FBS bowl count	40	Including the National Championship game
Canceled, prior to team selections	−9	Bahamas, Frisco, Hawaii, Holiday, Quick Lane, Redbox, Pinstripe, Sun, Las Vegas
Canceled, due to lack of teams	−4	Birmingham, Independence, Guaranteed Rate, Military
Canceled, after team selections	−3	Gasparilla Bowl, Music City, Texas
New bowls debuting in 2020	+1	Myrtle Beach Bowl
Debuts postponed to 2021	—	Fenway Bowl, LA Bowl
Substitute bowl for this season	+1	Montgomery Bowl
2020–21 FBS bowl count	26	

== Awards and honors ==
=== Heisman Trophy voting ===
The Heisman Trophy is given to the year's most outstanding player

Player	School	Position	1st	2nd	3rd	Total
DeVonta Smith	Alabama	WR	447	221	73	1,856
Trevor Lawrence	Clemson	QB	222	176	169	1,187
Mac Jones	Alabama	QB	138	248	220	1,130
Kyle Trask	Florida	QB	61	164	226	737
Najee Harris	Alabama	RB	16	47	74	216
Breece Hall	Iowa State	RB	6	10	26	64
Justin Fields	Ohio State	QB	5	6	21	48
Zach Wilson	BYU	QB	3	6	21	42
Ian Book	Notre Dame	QB	5	5	13	38
Kyle Pitts	Florida	TE	0	7	10	24

=== Other overall ===
- AP Player of the Year: DeVonta Smith, WR, Alabama
- Lombardi Award (top player): Zaven Collins, LB, Tulsa
- Maxwell Award (top player): DeVonta Smith, WR, Alabama
- SN Player of the Year: DeVonta Smith, WR, Alabama
- Walter Camp Award (top player): DeVonta Smith, WR, Alabama

=== Special overall ===
- Burlsworth Trophy (top player who began as walk-on): Jimmy Morrissey, C, Pittsburgh
- Paul Hornung Award (most versatile player): DeVonta Smith, WR, Alabama
- Jon Cornish Trophy (top Canadian player): John Metchie III, WR, Alabama
- Campbell Trophy ("academic Heisman"): Brady White, QB, Memphis
- Wuerffel Trophy (humanitarian-athlete): Teton Saltes, OL, New Mexico
- Senior CLASS Award (senior student-athlete): Kekaula Kaniho, CB, Boise State

=== Offense ===
Quarterback

- Davey O'Brien Award: Mac Jones, Alabama
- Johnny Unitas Golden Arm Award (senior/4th year quarterback): Mac Jones, Alabama
- Manning Award: Mac Jones, Alabama

Running back

- Doak Walker Award: Najee Harris, Alabama

Wide receiver

- Fred Biletnikoff Award: DeVonta Smith, Alabama

Tight end

- John Mackey Award: Kyle Pitts, Florida

Lineman:

- Rimington Trophy (center): Landon Dickerson, Alabama
- Outland Trophy (interior lineman on either offense or defense): Alex Leatherwood, OT, Alabama
- Joe Moore Award (offensive line): Alabama

=== Defense ===
- Bronko Nagurski Trophy (defensive player): Zaven Collins, LB, Tulsa
- Chuck Bednarik Award (defensive player): Zaven Collins, LB, Tulsa
- Lott Trophy (defensive impact): Paddy Fisher, LB, Northwestern

Defensive front

- Dick Butkus Award (linebacker): Jeremiah Owusu-Koramoah, Notre Dame
- Ted Hendricks Award (defensive end):

Defensive back

- Jim Thorpe Award: Trevon Moehrig, TCU

=== Special teams ===
- Lou Groza Award (placekicker): José Borregales, Miami (FL)
- Ray Guy Award (punter): Pressley Harvin III, Georgia Tech
- Jet Award (return specialist): Avery Williams, Boise State
- Patrick Mannelly Award (long snapper): Thomas Fletcher, Alabama
- Peter Mortell Holder of the Year Award: Spencer Jones, Oklahoma

=== Coaches ===
- AFCA Coach of the Year: Tom Allen, Indiana
- AP Coach of the Year: Jamey Chadwell, Coastal Carolina
- Bobby Dodd Coach of the Year: Pat Fitzgerald, Northwestern
- Eddie Robinson Coach of the Year: Jamey Chadwell, Coastal Carolina
- George Munger Award: Jamey Chadwell, Coastal Carolina
- Home Depot Coach of the Year: Jamey Chadwell, Coastal Carolina
- Paul "Bear" Bryant Award: Nick Saban, Alabama
- Walter Camp Coach of the Year: Jamey Chadwell, Coastal Carolina

==== Assistants ====
- AFCA Assistant Coach of the Year: Randy Bates, DC, Pittsburgh
- Broyles Award: Steve Sarkisian, OC, Alabama

== Coaching changes ==
=== Preseason and in-season ===
This is restricted to coaching changes taking place on or after May 1, 2020, and will also include any changes announced after a team's last regularly scheduled game but before its bowl game. For coaching changes that occurred earlier in 2020, see 2019 NCAA Division I FBS end-of-season coaching changes.

Team	Outgoing coach	Date	Reason	Replacement
Southern Miss	Jay Hopson	September 7, 2020	Resigned	Scotty Walden (Interim)
Southern Miss	Scotty Walden (Interim)	October 27, 2020	Hired by Austin Peay	Tim Billings (Interim)
Utah State	Gary Andersen	November 7, 2020	Resigned	Frank Maile (Interim)
South Carolina	Will Muschamp	November 15, 2020	Fired	Mike Bobo (Interim)
Vanderbilt	Derek Mason	November 29, 2020	Fired	Todd Fitch (Interim)
Illinois	Lovie Smith	December 13, 2020	Fired	Rod Smith (Interim)
Auburn	Gus Malzahn	December 13, 2020	Fired	Kevin Steele (Interim)

=== End of season ===
This list includes coaching changes announced during the season that did not take effect until the end of the season.

Team	Outgoing coach	Date	Reason	Replacement
Southern Miss	Tim Billings (Interim)	December 2, 2020	Permanent replacement	Will Hall
South Carolina	Mike Bobo (Interim)	December 6, 2020	Permanent replacement	Shane Beamer
South Alabama	Steve Campbell	December 6, 2020	Fired	Kane Wommack
Louisiana–Monroe	Matt Viator	December 7, 2020	Fired	Terry Bowden
Utah State	Frank Maile (Interim)	December 10, 2020	Permanent replacement	Blake Anderson
Arkansas State	Blake Anderson	December 10, 2020	Hired by Utah State	Butch Jones
Arizona	Kevin Sumlin	December 12, 2020	Fired	Jedd Fisch
Vanderbilt	Todd Fitch (Interim)	December 14, 2020	Permanent replacement	Clark Lea
Illinois	Rod Smith (Interim)	December 19, 2020	Permanent replacement	Bret Bielema
Auburn	Kevin Steele (Interim)	December 22, 2020	Permanent replacement	Bryan Harsin
Boise State	Bryan Harsin	December 22, 2020	Hired by Auburn	Andy Avalos
Texas	Tom Herman	January 2, 2021	Fired	Steve Sarkisian
Marshall	Doc Holliday	January 4, 2021	Contract not renewed	Charles Huff
Tennessee	Jeremy Pruitt	January 18, 2021	Fired	Josh Heupel
UCF	Josh Heupel	January 27, 2021	Hired by Tennessee	Gus Malzahn
Kansas	Les Miles	March 8, 2021	Mutually agreed to part ways	Lance Leipold
Buffalo	Lance Leipold	April 30, 2021	Hired by Kansas	Maurice Linguist

== Television viewers and ratings ==
=== Most-watched regular season games ===
All times Eastern. Rankings are from the AP Poll (before 11/24) and CFP Rankings (thereafter).

Rank	Date	Matchup				Network	Viewers (millions)	TV Rating	Significance
1	November 7, 7:30pm	No. 1 Clemson	40	No. 4 Notre Dame	47	NBC, USA	10.07	5.4	Primetime game/College GameDay
2	October 17, 8:00pm	No. 3 Georgia	24	No. 2 Alabama	41	CBS	9.61	5.3	College GameDay/Rivalry
3	November 28, 3:30pm	No. 22 Auburn	13	No. 1 Alabama	42	CBS	6.66	3.6	College GameDay/Rivalry
4	October 31, 7:30pm	No. 3 Ohio State	38	No. 18 Penn State	25	ABC	6.53	3.5	College GameDay/Rivalry
5	November 21, 12:00pm	No. 9 Indiana	35	No. 3 Ohio State	42	FOX	6.36	3.7	Big Noon Kickoff
6	November 7, 3:30pm	No. 8 Florida	44	No. 5 Georgia	28	CBS	6.34	3.5	Rivalry
7	October 24, 12:00pm	Nebraska	17	No. 5 Ohio State	52	FOX	6.18	3.4	Big Noon Kickoff
8	November 27, 3:30pm	No. 2 Notre Dame	31	No. 19 North Carolina	17	ABC	6.07	3.5	
9	October 10, 3:30pm	No. 14 Tennessee	21	No. 3 Georgia	44	CBS	5.77	3.1	Rivalry
10	November 14, 3:30pm	No. 2 Notre Dame	45	Boston College	31	ABC	5.14	3.0	Rivalry

=== Conference championship games ===
All times Eastern. Rankings are from the CFP Rankings.

Rank	Date	Matchup				Network	Viewers (millions)	TV Rating	Conference	Location
1	December4:00 pm:00pm	No. 3 Clemson	34	No. 2 Notre Dame	10	ABC	9.92	5.5	ACC	Bank of America Stadium, Charlotte, NC
2	Decembe8:00 pm8:00pm	No. 1 Alabama	52	No. 7 Florida	46	CBS	8.92	4.9	SEC	Mercedes-Benz Stadium, Atlanta, GA
3	Decemb12:00 pm12:00pm	No. 14 Northwestern	10	No. 4 Ohio State	22	FOX	8.03	4.6	Big Ten	Lucas Oil Stadium, Indianapolis, IN
4	Decem8:00 pm, 8:00 pm	Oregon	31	No. 13 USC	24	FOX	3.85	2.2	Pac-12	Los Angeles Memorial Coliseum, Los Angeles, CA
5	Dece12:00 pm, 12:00pm	No. 10 Oklahoma	27	No. 6 Iowa State	21	ABC	2.99	1.8	Big 12	AT&T Stadium, Arlington, TX
6	Dec8:00 pm19, 8:00pm	No. 23 Tulsa	24	No. 9 Cincinnati	27	ABC	1.88	1.1	American	Nippert Stadium, Cincinnati, OH
7	De4:15 pm 19, 4:15pm	Boise State	20	No. 24 San Jose State	34	FOX	1.42	0.9	MW	Sam Boyd Stadium, Whitney, NV
8	D7:30 pmr 18, 7:30pm	Ball State	38	No. 23 Buffalo	28	ESPN	0.875	0.4	MAC	Ford Field, Detroit, MI
9	7:00 pmer 18, 7:00pm	UAB	22	Marshall	13	CBSSN	n.a.	n.a.	C-USA	Joan C. Edwards Stadium, Huntington, WV

=== Most watched non-CFP bowl games ===
All times Eastern. Rankings are from the CFP Rankings.

Rank	Date	Matchup				Network	Viewers (millions)	TV Rating	Game	Location
1	January 1	No. 9 Georgia	24	No. 8 Cincinnati	21	ESPN	8.7	4.9	Peach Bowl	Mercedes-Benz Stadium, Atlanta, GA
2	January 2	No. 13 North Carolina	27	No. 5 Texas A&M	41	ESPN	7.6	4.3	Orange Bowl	Hard Rock Stadium, Miami Gardens, FL
3	January 2	No. 25 Oregon	17	No. 10 Iowa State	34	ESPN	6.7	3.8	Fiesta Bowl	State Farm Stadium, Glendale, AZ
4	December 30	No. 7 Florida	20	No. 6 Oklahoma	55	ESPN	5.8	3.2	Cotton Bowl Classic	AT&T Stadium, Arlington, TX
5	January 1	Auburn	19	No. 14 Northwestern	35	ABC	4.8	2.8	Citrus Bowl	Camping World Stadium, Orlando, FL
6	January 2	Ole Miss	26	No. 11 Indiana	20	ABC	4.1	2.5	Outback Bowl	Raymond James Stadium, Tampa, FL
7	December 31	West Virginia	24	Army	21	ESPN	3.7	2.2	Liberty Bowl	Liberty Bowl Memorial Stadium, Memphis, TN
8	December 29	No. 21 Oklahoma State	37	No. 18 Miami (FL)	34	ESPN	3.2	1.8	Cheez-It Bowl	Camping World Stadium, Orlando, FL
9	December 29	No. 20 Texas	55	Colorado	23	ESPN	3.0	1.7	Alamo Bowl	Alamodome, San Antonio, TX
10	January 2	No. 23 NC State	21	Kentucky	23	ESPN	2.7	1.7	Gator Bowl	TIAA Bank Field, Jacksonville, FL

=== College Football Playoff ===
All times Eastern. Rankings are from the CFP Rankings.

Game	Date	Matchup				Network	Viewers (millions)	TV Rating	Location
Rose Bowl (semifinal)	January 1	No. 4 Notre Dame	14	No. 1 Alabama	31	ESPN	18.9	9.6	AT&T Stadium, Arlington, TX
Sugar Bowl (semifinal)	January 1	No. 3 Ohio State	49	No. 2 Clemson	28	ESPN	19.1	9.8	Mercedes-Benz Superdome, New Orleans, LA
National Championship	January 11	No. 3 Ohio State	24	No. 1 Alabama	52	ESPN	18.65	5.05	Hard Rock Stadium, Miami Gardens, FL

== See also ==
- 2020–21 NCAA Division I FCS football season
- 2020–21 NCAA Division II football season
- 2020–21 NCAA Division III football season
- 2020 NAIA football season
