= 2020 UConn Huskies football team =

Cancelled American college football season

2020 UConn Huskies football
- Conference: Independent
- Record: 0–0
- Head coach: Randy Edsall (16th season)
- Offensive coordinator: Frank Giufre (2nd season)
- Defensive coordinator: Lou Spanos (2nd season)
- Home stadium: Pratt & Whitney Stadium at Rentschler Field

2020 NCAA Division I FBS independents football records
	Conf.			Overall
Team	W		L	W		L
No. 11 BYU		–		11	–	1
No. 17 Liberty		–		10	–	1
Army		–		9	–	3
New Mexico State		–		1	–	1
UMass		–		0	–	4
Note: Due to COVID-19, UConn canceled the 2020 football season; New Mexico State was the only FBS school to play a spring schedule.; Rankings from AP Poll.

The 2020 UConn Huskies football team would have represented the University of Connecticut (UConn) in the 2020 NCAA Division I FBS football season. After competing since 2004 as a member of the Big East Conference and American Athletic Conference, the Huskies were slated to compete as an independent in 2020. However, on August 5, the university canceled its football season, due to the COVID-19 pandemic. The Huskies would have been led by fourth-year head coach Randy Edsall and would have played their home games at Rentschler Field in East Hartford, Connecticut.

The New York Times columnist Kurt Streeter argued UConn was the “real” national champion of the 2020 season, claiming the Huskies deserve this designation for opting out of the 2020 season due to COVID-19.

== Schedule ==
During the summer of 2020, UConn had six teams cancel games against the Huskies before the university canceled the rest of the remaining scheduled season. UConn became the first FBS program to cancel its entire schedule due to the COVID-19 pandemic. Below was the original schedule for the season.

Date	Opponent	Site	Result
September 3	UMass	Pratt & Whitney Stadium at Rentschler Field; East Hartford, CT (rivalry)	Cancelled
September 12	at Illinois	Memorial Stadium; Champaign, IL	Cancelled
September 19	at Virginia	Scott Stadium; Charlottesville, VA	Cancelled
September 26	Indiana	Pratt & Whitney Stadium at Rentschler Field; East Hartford, CT	Cancelled
October 3	Old Dominion	Pratt & Whitney Stadium at Rentschler Field; East Hartford, CT	Cancelled
October 10	Maine	Rentschler Field; Pratt & Whitney Stadium at Rentschler Field	Cancelled
October 24	at Ole Miss	Vaught–Hemingway Stadium; Oxford, MS	Cancelled
October 31	Liberty	Pratt & Whitney Stadium at Rentschler Field; East Hartford, CT	Cancelled
November 7	at North Carolina	Kenan Memorial Stadium; Chapel Hill, NC	Cancelled
November 14	at San Jose State	CEFCU Stadium; San Jose, CA	Cancelled
November 21	Middle Tennessee	Rentschler Field; Pratt & Whitney Stadium at Rentschler Field	Cancelled
November 28	Army	Pratt & Whitney Stadium at Rentschler Field; East Hartford, CT	Cancelled

== Preseason ==
=== Award watch lists ===
Listed in the order that they were released.

Award	Player	Position	Year
Doak Walker Award	Kevin Mensah	RB	SR
Wuerffel Trophy	Brian Keating	LS	SR

== Roster ==
2020 Connecticut Huskies football team roster
Players
Coaches
Offense

Pos.	#	Name	Class
WR	1	Keelan Marion	Fr
WR	3	Heron Maurisseau	So
WR	4	Matt Drayton	So
WR	7	Cameron Ross	So
QB	8	Steven Krajewski	So
WR	9	Darius Bush	Fr
QB	10	Micah Leon	Jr
QB	11	Jack Zergiotis	So
QB	12	Jonathan Senecal	Fr
QB	13	Miles Foerster	Fr
WR	14	Elijah Jeffreys	So
RB	25	Devontae Houston	Fr
RB	26	Nate Carter	Fr
RB	28	Brian Brewton	Fr
RB	34	Kevin Mensah	Sr
RB	35	Dominico Moncion	Jr
RB	36	Khyon Gillespie	So
RB	38	Lavarey Banton	So
WR	39	Hayden Jordan	Fr
TE	47	Ventine Richardson	Jr
OL	50	Dylan Niedrowski	So
OL	51	Peter Rooney Jr.	So
OL	53	Sidney Walker	Jr
OL	54	Remon Young	Fr
OL	60	Mason Raymer	Fr
OL	61	Jesse Polansky	Fr
OL	62	Noel Ofori-Nyadu	So
OL	64	Christian Haynes	So
OL	66	Zack Early	Fr
OL	67	Christopher Fortin	Fr
OL	69	Will Meyer	Fr
OL	71	Ryan Denmark	Fr
OL	72	Rayonte Brown	Fr
OL	73	Alex Wyant	Fr
OL	74	Ryan Van Demark	Sr
OL	75	Chase Lundt	Fr
OL	76	Jonathan Pace	Jr
OL	77	Robby Rochester	Fr
OL	78	Andrew Torres-Silva	Jr
TE	80	Jayce Medlock	So
TE	81	Jay Rose	Sr
TE	82	Brendan Heatherman	Fr
TE	83	Brandon Niemenski	Fr
WR	84	Jacob Flynn	Fr
TE	85	Russell Dixon	Fr
WR	86	Kevens Clercius	Fr
WR	87	Cameron Hairston	Jr
WR	89	Jahkai Gill	So
TE	90	Tim O'Shea	So

Defense

Pos.	#	Name	Class
DB	0	Reyan Blake	Fr
DB	2	Myles Bell	So
DB	3	Diamond Harrell	Sr
LB	5	Terrence Ganyi	So
DB	6	Keyshawn Paul	Jr
DB	7	Tre Wortham	Jr
DB	8	Jalon Ferrell	So
LB	15	Tui Faumuina-Brown	Fr
DB	16	Malik Banks	So
DB	18	Abiola Olaniyan	Jr
DB	19	Durante Jones	Fr
DB	20	Robert King III	Jr
DB	21	Jeremy Lucien	Jr
DB	22	Alfred Chea	Fr
DB	23	Juan Rosario	So
LB	24	Desmond Fogle	Fr
LB	27	Omar Fortt	Sr
LB	29	Jordan Morrison	So
DB	31	Malik Dixon	Fr
DB	32	Shamel Lazarus	So
LB	33	Hunter Webb	So
DB	36	Jaylen Jones	Fr
DB	37	Kyle Williams	GS
DB	38	Winston Jules	Fr
LB	41	D.J. Morgan	GS
DL	42	T.J. Gardner	Jr
LB	43	Jackson Mitchell	So
LB	44	Ian Swenson	Jr
DL	46	Marques Alexander	Fr
LB	47	Justin Bryant	So
DL	48	Kevon Jones	Jr
DL	52	Caleb Thomas	Jr
DL	55	MarQuayveon Evans	Fr
DL	56	Carter Hooper	Fr
DL	57	Travis Jones	Jr
LB	58	Dillon Harris	Sr
DL	68	Justin Moore	Fr
DL	91	Collin McCarthy	Fr
DL	93	Pierce DeVaughn	So
DL	94	Nick Harris	Fr
DL	95	Eric Watts	So
DL	96	Dal'mont Gourdine	Fr
DL	98	Lwal Uguak	Jr

Special teams

Pos.	#	Name	Class
P	17	Blake Otto	Fr
K	49	Clayton Harris	So
LS	53	Brian Keating	Sr
LS	59	Nilay Upadhyayula	Fr
LS	63	Kevin Cahill	So
K	92	Noah Iden	So
K	97	Noe Ruelas	Fr
P	99	Luke Magliozzi	Jr

Head coach

- Randy Edsall

Coordinators/assistant coaches

- Frank Giufre
  Offensive coordinator/offensive line
- Lou Spanos
  Defensive coordinator
- Kyle Weiss
  Running backs
- Corey Edsall
  Tight ends
- Darrell Perkins
  Defensive backs
- Dennis Dottin-Carter
  Defensive line
- Aaron Smith
  Wide receivers
- Mike Moyseenko
  Quarterbacks
- Eddie Allen
  Special teams coordinator
- Jarren Horton
  Star, nickel, dime

Legend

- (C) Team captain
- (S) Suspended
- (I) Ineligible
- Injured
- Redshirt

Roster
Last update: June 9, 2020
