= 2020 Liberty Flames football team =

American college football season

2020 Liberty Flames football

Cure Bowl champion

Cure Bowl, W 37–34^{OT} vs. Coastal Carolina
- Conference: Independent

Ranking
- Coaches: No. 18
- AP: No. 17
- Record: 10–1
- Head coach: Hugh Freeze (2nd season)
- Co-offensive coordinators: Kent Austin (2nd season); Maurice Harris (2nd season)
- Offensive scheme: Multiple
- Defensive coordinator: Scott Symons (2nd season)
- Base defense: 4–2–5
- Home stadium: Williams Stadium

2020 NCAA Division I FBS independents football records
	Conf.			Overall
Team	W		L	W		L
No. 11 BYU		–		11	–	1
No. 17 Liberty		–		10	–	1
Army		–		9	–	3
New Mexico State		–		1	–	1
UMass		–		0	–	4
Note: Due to COVID-19, UConn canceled the 2020 football season; New Mexico State was the only FBS school to play a spring schedule.; Rankings from AP Poll.

The 2020 Liberty Flames football team represented Liberty University in the 2020 NCAA Division I FBS football season. They were led by second-year head coach Hugh Freeze and played their home games at Williams Stadium. The Flames competed as an FBS independent.

== Schedule ==
Liberty had games scheduled against Bowling Green, North Carolina A&T, UConn, and UMass, which were canceled due to the COVID-19 pandemic. These games were partially replaced with new match-ups announced with Coastal Carolina and North Alabama. The games against NC State and Syracuse were rescheduled for different days for the 2020 season.

Because of an increased number of COVID-19 cases within the football program, Liberty University's medical staff decided to pause its football team's activities and cancel the game with Coastal Carolina in Conway, South Carolina, scheduled for December 5. Ironically, the two teams were selected to play in the Cure Bowl at season's end, a match-up that Liberty won.

Date	Time	Opponent	Rank	Site	TV	Result	Attendance
September 19	12:00 p.m.	at Western Kentucky		Houchens Industries–L. T. Smith Stadium; Bowling Green, KY	ESPNU	W 30–24	4,276
September 26	1:00 p.m.	FIU		Williams Stadium; Lynchburg, VA	ESPNU	W 36–34	1,000
October 3	1:00 p.m.	North Alabama		Williams Stadium; Lynchburg, VA	ESPN3	W 28–7	1,000
October 10	12:00 p.m.	Louisiana–Monroe		Williams Stadium; Lynchburg, VA	ESPN2	W 40–7	1,000
October 17	12:00 p.m.	at Syracuse		Carrier Dome; Syracuse, NY	ACCRSN	W 38–21	0 (Behind closed doors)
October 24	1:00 p.m.	Southern Miss		Williams Stadium; Lynchburg, VA	ESPN3	W 56–35	1,000
November 7	12:00 p.m.	at Virginia Tech	No. 25	Lane Stadium; Blacksburg, VA	ACCN	W 38–35	1,000
November 14	12:00 p.m.	Western Carolina	No. 22	Williams Stadium; Lynchburg, VA	ESPNU	W 58–14	1,000
November 21	7:30 p.m.	at NC State	No. 21	Carter–Finley Stadium; Raleigh, NC	ACCRSN	L 14–15	4,032
November 27	12:00 p.m.	UMass		Williams Stadium; Lynchburg, VA	ESPN3	W 45–0	
~~December 5~~	2:00 p.m.	at No. 18 Coastal Carolina		Brooks Stadium; Conway, SC (College Gameday) (rivalry)	ESPNU	No contest	_
December 26	7:30 p.m.	vs. No. 12 Coastal Carolina		Camping World Stadium; Orlando, FL (Cure Bowl) (rivalry)	ESPN	W 37–34 ^{OT}	4,488
Rankings from AP Poll and CFP Rankings after November 24 released prior to game; All times are in Eastern time

Schedule source:

== Rankings ==
In week 5, Liberty received votes in the Coaches Poll for the first time in program history and the following week, they received votes in the AP Poll for the first time. In week 9, they were nationally ranked for the first time, when they were ranked at No. 25 in the AP Poll. They would spend 8 total weeks in the rankings, finishing at No. 17.

Ranking movements Legend: ██ Increase in ranking ██ Decrease in ranking — = Not ranked RV = Received votes
	Week																	
Poll	Pre	1	2	3	4	5	6	7	8	9	10	11	12	13	14	15	16	Final
AP	—	—	—	—	—	—	RV	RV	RV	25	22	21	RV	25	22	22	23	17
Coaches	—	—	—	—	—	RV	RV	RV	RV	RV	22	22	RV	25	21	21	23	18
CFP	Not released												—	—	—	—	—	Not released

== Game summaries ==
=== At Western Kentucky ===
Liberty at Western Kentucky

Team	1	2	3	4	Total
• Flames	10	7	7	6	30
Hilltoppers	0	10	7	7	24

- Date: September 19, 2020
- Location: Houchens Industries–L. T. Smith Stadium
  Bowling Green, KY
- Game start: 12:02 p.m. EDT
- Elapsed time: 3 hours and 14 minutes
- Game attendance: 4,276
- Game weather: 64 °F (18 °C) • Weather: Sunny • Wind: NE 9 MPH
- Referee: Joe Lehring
- TV announcers (ESPNU): Clay Matvick (play–by–play) and Rocky Boiman (analyst)

Scoring summary
1	11:27	LIB	Malik Willis 4-yard rush (Alex Barbir kick) (5 plays, 52 yards, 2:02)	LIB 7–0
1	05:21	LIB	Alex Barbir 24-yard field goal (14 plays, 70 yards, 4:36)	LIB 10–0
2	14:56	WKU	Brayden Narveson 43-yard field goal (11 plays, 47 yards, 5:25)	LIB 10–3
2	10:15	LIB	Malik Willis 4-yard rush (Alex Barbir kick) (11 plays, 65 yards, 4:41)	LIB 17–3
2	06:15	WKU	Mitchell Tinsley 6-yard pass from Tyrrell Pigrome (Brayden Narveson kick) (8 plays, 88 yards, 4:00)	LIB 17–10
3	10:56	LIB	Dalvin Smith 24-yard pass from Tyrrell Pigrome (Brayden Narveson kick) (7 plays, 79 yards, 3:00)	TIE 17–17
3	01:33	LIB	Shedro Louis 29-yard rush (Alex Barbir kick) (4 plays, 85 yards, 1:43)	LIB 24–17
4	11:43	LIB	Malik Willis 18-yard rush (Alex Barbir PAT failed) (6 plays, 57 yards, 3:17)	LIB 30–17
4	03:04	WKU	Craig Burt Jr. 24-yard pass from Tyrrell Pigrome (Brayden Narveson kick) (9 plays, 87 yards, 3:41)	LIB 30–24

Statistics	Liberty	Western Kentucky
First downs	27	19
Total yards	487	291
Rushing yards	354	110
Passing yards	133	181
Turnovers	0	0
Time of possession	34:59	25:01

Team	Category	Player	Statistics
Liberty	Passing	Malik Willis	13/21, 133 yards
Liberty	Rushing	Malik Willis	21 carries, 168 yards, 3 TDs
Liberty	Receiving	CJ Yarbrough	2 receptions, 53 yards
Western Kentucky	Passing	Tyrrell Pigrome	18/25, 181 yards, 3 TDs
Western Kentucky	Rushing	Tyrrell Pigrome	14 carries, 74 yards
Western Kentucky	Receiving	Mitchell Tinsley	6 receptions, 69 yards, 1 TD

=== FIU ===
Florida International at Liberty

Team	1	2	3	4	Total
Panthers	14	0	14	6	34
• Flames	14	0	13	9	36

- Date: September 26, 2020
- Location: Williams Stadium
  Lynchburg, VA
- Game start: 1:05 p.m. EDT
- Elapsed time: 3 hours and 19 minutes
- Game attendance: 1,000
- Game weather: 72 °F (22 °C) • Weather: Cloudy • Wind: 3 E MPH
- Referee: Riley Johnson
- TV announcers (ESPNU): Matt Warner (play–by–play), Joe Jauch (analyst), and Emily Austen (sideline reporter)

Scoring summary
1	14:51	FIU	Lexington Joseph 100-yard kickoff returned (Chase Gabriel kick) (0 plays, 0 yards, 0:09)	FIU 7–0
1	12:40	LIB	Noah Fritch 24-yard pass from Malik Willis (Alex Barbir kick) (5 plays, 75 yards, 2:11)	TIE 7–7
1	05:20	LIB	Peyton Pickett 2-yard rush (Alex Barbir kick) (10 plays, 57 yards, 5:51)	LIB 14–7
1	02:16	FIU	D'Vonte Price 30-yard rush (Chase Gabriel kick) (8 plays, 82 yards, 3:04)	TIE 14–14
3	12:26	LIB	Alex Barbir 27-yard field goal (6 plays, 66 yards, 2:34)	LIB 17–14
3	08:37	LIB	DJ Stubbs 14-yard pass from Malik Willis (Alex Barbir kick) (6 plays, 61 yards, 2:23)	LIB 24–14
3	08:02	FIU	D'Vonte Price 65-yard rush (Chase Gabriel kick) (2 plays, 79 yards, 0:35)	LIB 24–21
3	04:35	LIB	Alex Barbir 21-yard field goal (9 plays, 72 yards, 3:27)	LIB 27–21
3	01:42	FIU	Bryce Singelton 45-yard pass from Stone Norton (Chase Gabriel kick) (7 plays, 75 yards, 2:53)	FIU 28–27
4	12:27	LIB	Joshua Mack 2-yard rush (two-point conversion rush attempt failed) (9 plays, 75 yards, 4:15)	LIB 33–28
4	06:32	LIB	Alex Barbir 27-yard field goal (7 plays, 73 yards, 3:12)	LIB 36–28
4	04:30	FIU	D'Vonte Price 6-yard pass from Stone Norton (two-point conversion pass attempt failed) (4 plays, 33 yards, 2:02)	LIB 36–34

Statistics	FIU	Liberty
First downs	16	31
Total yards	304	527
Rushing yards	168	219
Passing yards	136	308
Turnovers	0	0
Time of possession	22:39	37:21

Team	Category	Player	Statistics
FIU	Passing	Stone Norton	9/13, 120 yards, 2 TDs
FIU	Rushing	D'Vonte Price	13 carries, 148 yards, 2 TDs
FIU	Receiving	Bryce Singleton	2 receptions, 50 yards, 1 TD
Liberty	Passing	Malik Willis	24/30, 285 yards, 2 TDs
Liberty	Rushing	Joshua Mack	13 carries, 107 yards, 1 TD
Liberty	Receiving	DJ Stubbs	8 receptions, 119 yards, 1 TD

=== North Alabama ===
North Alabama at Liberty

Team	1	2	3	4	Total
Lions	0	0	0	7	7
• Flames	0	7	14	7	28

- Date: October 3, 2020
- Location: Williams Stadium
  Lynchburg, VA
- Game start: 1:05 p.m. EDT
- Elapsed time: 2 hours and 53 minutes
- Game attendance: 1,000
- Game weather: 63 °F (17 °C) • Weather: Sunny • Wind: 7 E MPH
- Referee: Duane Heydt
- TV announcers (ESPN3): Matt Warner (play–by–play), Joe Jauch (analyst), and Emily Austen (sideline reporter)

Scoring summary
2	06:12	LIB	Demario Douglas 7-yard pass from Chris Ferguson (Alex Barbir kick) (6 plays, 40 yards, 2:09)	LIB 7–0
3	13:16	LIB	DJ Stubbs 12-yard pass from Chris Ferguson (Alex Barbir kick) (6 plays, 72 yards, 1:44)	LIB 14–0
3	05:37	LIB	Brody Brumm 2-yard pass from Chris Ferguson (Alex Barbir kick) (13 plays, 51 yards, 5:49)	LIB 21–0
4	14:23	LIB	Chris Barrett 5-yard pass from Johnathan Bennett (Alex Barbir kick) (8 plays, 69 yards, 2:43)	LIB 28–0
4	05:49	UNA	Parker Driggers 5-yard rush (Sam Contorno kick) (3 plays, 12 yards, 1:30)	LIB 28–7

Statistics	North Alabama	Liberty
First downs	14	22
Total yards	247	357
Rushing yards	63	250
Passing yards	184	107
Turnovers	3	1
Time of possession	32:10	27:50

Team	Category	Player	Statistics
North Alabama	Passing	Rett Files	15/24, 156 yards, 2 INTs
North Alabama	Rushing	Parker Driggers	7 carries, 55 yards, 1 TD
North Alabama	Receiving	Andre Little	1 reception, 47 yards
Liberty	Passing	Chris Ferguson	12/21, 64 yards, 3 TDs
Liberty	Rushing	Joshua Mack	16 carries, 130 yards
Liberty	Receiving	CJ Yarbrough	2 receptions, 43 yards

=== Louisiana–Monroe ===
Louisiana–Monroe at Liberty

Team	1	2	3	4	Total
Warhawks	0	0	0	7	7
• Flames	14	10	7	9	40

- Date: October 10, 2020
- Location: Williams Stadium
  Lynchburg, VA
- Game start: 11:02 a.m. CDT
- Elapsed time: 3 hours and 10 minutes
- Game attendance:
- Game weather: 63 °F (17 °C) • Weather: Rainy • Wind: SW 5 MPH
- Referee: Jeff Heaser
- TV announcers (ESPN2): Mike Couzens (play–by–play), Jay Walker (analyst), and Taylor Davis (sideline reporter)

Scoring summary
1	10:01	LIB	Peytton Pickett 15-yard rush (Alex Barbir kick) (4 plays, 24 yards, 1:41)	LIB 7–0
1	06:11	LIB	Malik Willis 6-yard rush (Alex Barbir kick) (7 plays, 41 yards, 2:58)	LIB 14–0
2	03:56	LIB	Treon Sibley 0-yard fumble returned (Alex Barbir kick) (4 plays, −5 yards, 1:51)	LIB 21–0
2	01:46	LIB	Alex Barbir 42-yard field goal (4 plays, −2 yards, 1:13)	LIB 24–0
3	11:07	LIB	Chancellor Smith 0-yard return of blocked punt (Alex Barbir kick) (3 plays, 7 yards, 1:12)	LIB 31–0
4	12:45	LIB	Alex Barbir 30-yard field goal (15 plays, 87 yards, 6:28)	LIB 34–0
4	10:27	LIB	Demario Douglas 73-yard punt returned (Alex Barbir PAT failed) (3 plays, 8 yards, 2:18)	LIB 40–0
4	03:34	ULM	Kadyn Roach 15-yard pass from Jeremy Hunt (Davis Hughes kick) (8 plays, 58 yards, 3:17)	LIB 40–7

Statistics	Louisiana–Monroe	Liberty
First downs	10	20
Total yards	198	400
Rushing yards	78	180
Passing yards	120	220
Turnovers	3	2
Time of possession	27:49	32:11

Team	Category	Player	Statistics
Louisiana–Monroe	Passing	Colby Suits	13/29, 78 yards, 2 INTs
Louisiana–Monroe	Rushing	Josh Johnson	13 carries, 51 yards
Louisiana–Monroe	Receiving	Josh Pederson	2 receptions, 21 yards
Liberty	Passing	Malik Willis	11/29, 177 yards, 1 INT
Liberty	Rushing	Malik Willis	13 carries, 87 yards, 1 TD
Liberty	Receiving	DJ Stubbs	2 receptions, 69 yards

=== At Syracuse ===
Liberty at Syracuse

Team	1	2	3	4	Total
• Flames	14	7	14	3	38
Orange	7	7	0	7	21

- Date: October 17, 2020
- Location: Carrier Dome
  Syracuse, NY
- Game start: 12:00 p.m. EDT
- Elapsed time: 3 hours and 8 minutes
- Game attendance: 0
- Game weather: Indoors
- Referee: J. Magallanes
- TV announcers (ACCRSN): Evan Lepler (play–by–play), Charles Arbuckle (analyst), Abby Labar (sideline reporter)

Scoring summary
1	08:32	SYR	Taj Harris 17 Yd pass from Rex Culpepper (Andre Szmyt Kick) (9 plays, 61 yards, 3:55)	SYR 0–7
1	08:14	LIB	Shedro Louis 75 Yd Run (Alex Barbir Kick) (2 plays, 75 yards, 0:18)	TIE 7–7
1	00:28	LIB	Malik Willis 4 Yd Run (Alex Barbir Kick) (11 plays, 88 yards, 5:11)	LIB 14–7
2	09:21	SYR	Aaron Hackett 12 Yd pass from Rex Culpepper (Andre Szmyt Kick) (3 plays, 36 yards, 1:06)	TIE 14–14
2	07:49	LIB	Shedro Louis 52 Yd Run (Alex Barbir Kick) (3 plays, 78 yards, 1:32)	LIB 21–14
3	12:55	LIB	DJ Stubbs 36 Yd pass from Malik Willis (Alex Barbir Kick) (4 plays, 78 yards, 2:05)	LIB 28–14
3	02:58	LIB	Peytton Pickett 16 Yd Run (Alex Barbir Kick) (7 plays, 59 yards, 3:47)	LIB 35–14
4	08:45	SYR	Anthony Queeley 21 Yd pass from Rex Culpepper (Andre Szmyt Kick) (7 plays, 65 yards, 2:16)	LIB 35–21
4	05:20	LIB	Alex Barbir 20 Yd Field Goal (7 plays, 44 yards, 3:25)	LIB 38–21

Statistics	Liberty	Syracuse
First downs	24	19
Total yards	520	308
Rushing yards	338	97
Passing yards	182	211
Turnovers	2	1
Time of possession	36:24	23:36

Team	Category	Player	Statistics
Liberty	Passing	Malik Willis	16/20, 182 yards, 1 TD
Liberty	Rushing	Shedro Louis	10 carries, 170 yards, 2 TDs
Liberty	Receiving	DJ Stubbs	4 receptions, 58 yards, 1 TD
Syracuse	Passing	Rex Culpepper	19/40, 211 yards, 3 TDs, 1 INT
Syracuse	Rushing	Sean Tucker	21 carries, 111 yards
Syracuse	Receiving	Taj Harris	9 receptions, 96 yards, 1 TD

=== Southern Miss ===
Southern Mississippi at Liberty

Team	1	2	3	4	Total
Golden Eagles	7	0	21	7	35
• Flames	14	21	7	14	56

- Date: October 24, 2020
- Location: Williams Stadium
  Lynchburg, VA
- Game start: 1:00 p.m. EDT
- Elapsed time: 3 hours and 27 minutes
- Game attendance: 1,000
- Game weather: 80 °F (27 °C) • Weather: Sunny • Wind: W 5 MPH
- Referee: Billy Williams
- TV announcers (ESPN3): Matt Warner (play–by–play), Joe Jauch (analyst), Emily Austen (sideline reporter)

Scoring summary
1	12:00	USM	Tate Whatley 10 Yd Run (Briggs Bourgeois Kick) (7 plays, 75 yards, 3:00)	USM 7–0
1	11:14	LIB	Kevin Shaa 39 Yd pass from Malik Willis (Alex Barbir Kick) (3 plays, 65 yards, 0:46)	TIE 7–7
1	01:21	LIB	Demario Douglas 12 Yd pass from Malik Willis (Alex Barbir Kick) (12 plays, 88 yards, 6:15)	LIB 7–14
2	08:41	LIB	Kevin Shaa 11 Yd pass from Malik Willis (Alex Barbir Kick) (13 plays, 83 yards, 6:08)	LIB 7–21
2	05:46	LIB	Chris Barrett 18 Yd pass from Malik Willis (Alex Barbir Kick) (4 plays, 35 yards, 1:24)	LIB 7–28
2	00:15	LIB	Johnny Huntley 10 Yd pass from Malik Willis (Alex Barbir Kick) (6 plays, 44 yards, 3:51)	LIB 7–35
3	14:21	USM	Tate Whatley 16 Yd Run (Briggs Bourgeois Kick) (1 play, 16 yards, 0:07)	LIB 14–35
3	11:05	USM	Tate Whatley 1 Yd Run (Briggs Bourgeois Kick) (8 plays, 35 yards, 3:16)	LIB 21–35
3	03:27	USM	Tate Whatley 4 Yd Run (Briggs Bourgeois Kick) (13 plays, 94 yards, 4:34)	LIB 28–35
3	01:32	LIB	CJ Daniels 42 Yd pass from Malik Willis (Alex Barbir Kick) (6 plays, 75 yards, 1:55)	LIB 28–42
4	07:22	LIB	Malik Willis 38 Yd Run (Alex Barbir Kick) (1 play, 38 yards, 0:10)	LIB 28–49
4	01:27	LIB	Joshua Mack 1 Yd Run (Alex Barbir Kick) (7 plays, 63 yards, 4:07)	LIB 28–56
4	00:18	USM	Jason Brownlee 17 Yd pass from Tate Whatley (Briggs Bourgeois Kick) (5 plays, 67 yards, 1:09)	LIB 35–56

Statistics	Southern Miss	Liberty
First downs	19	25
Total yards	416	537
Rushing yards	215	192
Passing yards	201	345
Turnovers	1	1
Time of possession	27:37	32:23

Team	Category	Player	Statistics
Southern Miss	Passing	Tate Whatley	15/26, 188 yards, 1 TD, 1 INT
Southern Miss	Rushing	Tate Whatley	12 carries, 52 yards, 4 TDs
Southern Miss	Receiving	Jason Brownlee	5 receptions, 114, 1 TD
Liberty	Passing	Malik Willis	24/31, 345, 6 TDs
Liberty	Rushing	Malik Willis	12 carries, 97 yards, 1 TD
Liberty	Receiving	Demario Douglas	6 receptions, 115 yards, 1 TD

=== At Virginia Tech ===
Liberty at Virginia Tech

Team	1	2	3	4	Total
• No. 25 Flames	7	7	7	17	38
Hokies	3	17	0	15	35

- Date: November 7, 2020
- Location: Lane Stadium
  Blacksburg, VA
- Game start: 12:00 p.m. EST
- Elapsed time: 3 hours and 22 minutes
- Game attendance: 1,000
- Game weather: 64 °F (18 °C) • Weather: Clear, nice • Wind: W 1 MPH
- Referee: Stuart Mullins
- TV announcers (ACCN): Chris Cotter (play–by–play), Mark Herzlich (analyst), Taylor Davis (sideline reporter)

Scoring summary
1	09:46	LIB	CJ Yarbrough 32 Yd pass from Malik Willis (Alex Barbir Kick) (9 plays, 75 yards, 5:14)	LIB 7–0
1	04:40	VT	Brian Johnson 41 Yd Field Goal (6 plays, 33 yards, 2:21)	LIB 7–3
2	12:11	LIB	Jerome Jackson 2 Yd pass from Malik Willis (Alex Barbir Kick) (14 plays, 80 yards, 7:25)	LIB 14–3
2	08:48	VT	Nick Gallo 3 Yd pass from Hendon Hooker (Brian Johnson Kick) (7 plays, 65 yards, 3:23)	LIB 14–10
2	04:36	VT	Hendon Hooker 12 Yd Run (Brian Johnson Kick) (2 plays, 30 yards, 1:11)	VT 14–17
2	00:01	VT	Brian Johnson 18 Yd Field Goal (12 plays, 90 yards, 1:45)	LIB 14–20
3	12:55	LIB	Malik Willis 19 Yd Run (Alex Barbir Kick) (11 plays, 95 yards, 6:31)	LIB 21–20
4	10:29	LIB	Johnny Huntley 5 Yd pass from Malik Willis (Alex Barbir Kick) (1 play, 6 yards, 0:04)	LIB 28–20
4	05:46	VT	Kaleb Smith 9 Yd pass from Hendon Hooker (Hendon Hooker Pass to Raheem Blackshear for Two-Point Conversion) (10 plays, 75 yards, 4:43)	TIE 28–28
4	01:41	LIB	Peytton Pickett 9 Yd Run (Alex Barbir Kick) (9 plays, 75 yards, 4:05)	LIB 35–28
4	00:52	VT	Tré Turner 12 Yd pass from Hendon Hooker (Brian Johnson Kick) (6 plays, 75 yards, 0:49)	TIE 35–35
4	00:01	LIB	Alex Barbir 51 Yd Field Goal (9 plays, 42 yards, 0:51)	LIB 38–35

Statistics	Liberty	Virginia Tech
First downs	29	24
Total yards	466	418
Rushing yards	249	201
Passing yards	217	217
Turnovers	2	1
Time of possession	37:27	22:33

Team	Category	Player	Statistics
Liberty	Passing	Malik Willis	20/30, 217 yards, 3 TDs
Liberty	Rushing	Malik Willis	19 carries, 108 yards, 1 TD
Liberty	Receiving	CJ Yarbrough	5 receptions, 65 yards, 1 TD
Virginia Tech	Passing	Hendon Hooker	20/27, 217 yards, 3 TDs
Virginia Tech	Rushing	Hendon Hooker	20 carries, 156 yards, 1 TD
Virginia Tech	Receiving	Tré Turner	6 receptions, 90 yards, 1 TD

The game featured a wild finish as Liberty got into field goal range with 8 seconds left to go in a 35–35 tie. Facing a 4th and 6 at the Virginia Tech 41-yard line, disaster appeared to strike when Liberty 59-yard field goal attempt was blocked and returned for a touchdown by Virginia Tech's Jermaine Waller with no time remaining. However, Virginia Tech had called a timeout to try to Icing the kicker before the play. Liberty then decided to go for it on fourth down, and got an 8-yard pass completion for a first down after Virginia Tech mistakenly thought that Flames would try a Hail Mary and went to a prevent defense. With 5 seconds remaining, the Flames converted a 51-yard field goal to win the game.

=== Western Carolina ===
Western Carolina at Liberty

Team	1	2	3	4	Total
Catamounts	0	7	7	0	14
• Flames	7	21	14	16	58

- Date: November 14, 2020
- Location: Williams Stadium
  Lynchburg, VA
- Game start: 12:02 p.m. EST
- Elapsed time: 3 hours and 16 minutes
- Game attendance: 1,000
- Game weather: 60 °F (16 °C) • Weather: Sunny • Wind: SW 5 MPH
- Referee: Riley Johnson
- Television network: ESPN3

Scoring summary
1	6:47	LIB	Joshua Mack 1-yard run (Alex Barbir kick) (12 plays, 66 yards, 5:10)	LIB 7–0
2	14:13	LIB	Johnny Huntley 44-yard pass from Malik Willis (Alex Barbir kick) (7 plays, 91 yards, 2:37)	LIB 14–0
2	12:09	WCU	Clayton Bardall 9-yard pass from Will Jones (Richard McCollum kick) (7 plays, 75 yards, 2:04)	LIB 14–7
2	9:50	LIB	Malik Willis 11-yard run (Alex Barbir kick) (6 plays, 75 yards, 2:19)	LIB 21–7
2	4:13	LIB	CJ Daniels 40-yard pass from Malik Willis (Alex Barbir kick) (6 plays, 62 yards, 3:15)	LIB 28–7
3	13:47	LIB	Malik Willis 43-yard run (Alex Barbir kick) (3 plays, 49 yards, 1:04)	LIB 35–7
3	10:49	LIB	Kevin Shaa 83-yard pass from Malik Willis (Alex Barbir kick) (1 play, 68 yards, 0:30)	LIB 42–7
3	3:12	WCU	Mark Wright 3-yard run (Richard McCollum kick) (11 plays, 57 yards, 4:41)	LIB 42–14
4	14:49	LIB	CJ Daniels 56-yard pass from Chris Ferguson (6 plays, 83 yards, 3:15)	LIB 48–14
4	12:49	LIB	Peytton Pickett 34-yard run (Jason Stricker kick) (2 plays, 35 yards, 0:34)	LIB 55–14
4	6:09	LIB	Alex Barbir 54-yard field goal (7 plays, 2 yards, 4:37)	LIB 58–14

Statistics	Western Carolina	Liberty
First downs	15	21
Total yards	282	633
Rushing yards	142	254
Passing yards	140	379
Turnovers	3	2
Time of possession	30:44	29:16

Team	Category	Player	Statistics
Western Carolina	Passing	Will Jones	7/13, 74 yards, TD, INT
Western Carolina	Rushing	Donnavan Spencer	12 carries, 79 yards
Western Carolina	Receiving	Owen Cosenke	5 receptions, 56 yards
Liberty	Passing	Malik Willis	14/19, 306 yards, 3 TD
Liberty	Rushing	Malik Willis	8 carries, 97 yards, 2 TD
Liberty	Receiving	Kevin Shaa	2 receptions, 137 yards, TD

=== At NC State ===
Liberty at NC State

Team	1	2	3	4	Total
Flames	0	7	7	0	14
• Wolfpack	0	7	2	6	15

- Date: November 21, 2020
- Location: Carter–Finley Stadium
  Raleigh, NC
- Game start: 7:35 p.m. EST
- Elapsed time: 3 hours and 20 minutes
- Game attendance: 4,032
- Game weather: 57 °F (14 °C) • Weather: Party Cloudy • Wind: Calm MPH
- Referee: Jeff Flanagan
- TV announcers (ACCRSN): Tom Werme, James Bates, Kelly Crull

Scoring summary
2	6:56	NCSU	Zonovan Knights 19-yard run (Christopher Dunn kick) (6 plays, 59 yards, 2:42)	NCSU 7–0
2	0:19	LIB	Noah Frith 12-yard pass from Malik Willis (Alex Barbir kick) (10 plays, 84 yards, 2:13)	TIED 7–7
3	7:11	LIB	Jerome Jackson 6-yard pass from Malik Willis (Alex Barbir kick) (6 plays, 53 yards, 2:24)	LIB 14–7
3	3:34	NCSU	Isaiah Moore 3-yard safety (1 play, –3 yards, 0:08)	LIB 14–9
4	6:53	NCSU	Zonovan Knight 4-yard run (2 point conversion failed) (6 plays, 26 yards, 1:53)	NCST 15–14

Statistics	Liberty	NC State
First downs	17	19
Total yards	279	321
Rushing yards	107	167
Passing yards	172	154
Turnovers	3	1
Time of possession	29:42	30:18

Team	Category	Player	Statistics
Liberty	Passing	Malik Willis	13/32, 171 yards, 2 TD
Liberty	Rushing	Joshua Mack	12 carries, 49 yards
Liberty	Receiving	Noah Frith	4 receptions, 73 yards, 1 TD
NC State	Passing	Bailey Hockman	14/27, 154 yards
NC State	Rushing	Zonovan Knight	14 carries, 96 yards, 2 TD
NC State	Receiving	Emeka Emezie	1 reception, 55 yards

=== UMass ===
Massachusetts at Liberty

Team	1	2	3	4	Total
Minutemen	0	0	0	0	0
• Flames	14	17	14	0	45

- Date: November 27, 2020
- Location: Williams Stadium
  Lynchburg, VA
- Game start: 12:05 p.m. EST
- Elapsed time: 2 hours and 55 minutes
- Game attendance: 250
- Game weather: Sunny • Temperature: 62 °F (17 °C) • Wind: E 4 MPH
- Referee: Riley Johnson
- Television network: ESPN3

Scoring summary
1	6:38	LIB	Kevin Shaa 31-yard pass from Malik Willis (Alex Barbir kick) (8 plays, 80 yards, 2:28)	LIB 7–0
1	1:12	LIB	Joshua Mack 59-yard run (2 plays, 72 yards, 0:28)	LIB 14–0
2	10:39	LIB	Michael Bollinger 13-yard pass from Malik Willis (Alex Barbir kick) (5 plays, 76 yards, 1:52)	LIB 21–0
2	4:41	LIB	Demario Douglas 41-yard pass from Malik Willis (Alex Barbir kick) (7 plays, 80 yards, 4:30)	LIB 28–0
2	0:02	LIB	Alex Barbir 24-yard field goal (7 plays, 55 yards, 0:37)	LIB 31–0
3	6:14	LIB	Malik Willis 54-yard run (Alex Barbir kick) (5 plays, 67 yards, 1:27)	LIB 38–0
3	0:26	LIB	Peytton Pickett 16-yard run (Alex Barbir kick) (3 plays, 41 yards, 1:35)	LIB 45–0

Statistics	UMass	Liberty
First downs	12	31
Total yards	227	629
Rushing yards	55	378
Passing yards	172	251
Turnovers	2	0
Time of possession	25:50	34:10

Team	Category	Player	Statistics
UMass	Passing	Garret Dzuro	9/22, 172 yards, 1 INT
UMass	Rushing	Cam Roberson	5 carries, 17 yards
UMass	Receiving	Samuel Emilus	4 receptions, 82 yards
Liberty	Passing	Malik Willis	16/24, 223 yards, 3 TD
Liberty	Rushing	Peytton Pickett	10 carries, 125 yards, 1 TD
Liberty	Receiving	DeMario Douglas	4 receptions, 68 yards, 1 TD

=== Vs. Coastal Carolina (Cure Bowl) ===
Liberty vs. Coastal Carolina

Team	1	2	3	4	OT	Total
• Flames	14	3	7	10	3	37
No. 12 Chanticleers	0	13	6	15	0	34

- Date: December 26, 2020
- Location: Camping World Stadium
  Orlando, FL
- Game start: 7:35 p.m. EST
- Elapsed time: 3 hours and 49 minutes
- Game attendance: 4,488
- Game weather: 44 °F (7 °C) • Weather: Frosty • Wind: Calm
- Referee: Ron Hudson
- TV announcers (ESPN): Roy Philpott (play–by–play), Kelly Stouffer (analyst), and Alex Chappell (sideline reporter)

Scoring summary
1	06:59	LIB	Malik Willis 5-yard rush (Alex Barbir kick) (10 plays, 64 yards, 4:54)	LIB 7–0
1	00:06	LIB	Malik Willis 6-yard rush (Alex Barbir kick) (9 plays, 68 yards, 5:18)	LIB 14–0
2	06:00	CCU	Massimo Biscardi 21-yard field goal (12 plays, 66 yards, 6:11)	LIB 14–3
2	02:02	CCU	Isaiah Likely 25-yard pass from Grayson McCall (Massimo Biscardi kick) (4 plays, 62 yards, 2:02)	LIB 14–10
2	00:42	LIB	Alex Barbir 37-yard field goal (7 plays, 40 yards, 1:20)	LIB 17–10
2	00:00	CCU	Massimo Biscardi 33-yard field goal (7 plays, 50 yards, 0:42)	LIB 17–13
3	08:28	LIB	Malik Willis 10-yard rush (Alex Barbir kick) (1 play, 10 yards, 0:05)	LIB 24–13
3	04:36	CCU	Greg Latushko 43-yard pass from Grayson McCall (Grayson McCall two-point conversion pass attempt failed) (7 plays, 80 yards, 3:52)	LIB 24–19
4	13:22	LIB	Malik Willis 3-yard rush (Alex Barbir kick) (11 plays, 75 yards, 6:14)	LIB 31–19
4	10:34	CCU	Grayson McCall 1-yard rush (Massimo Biscardi kick) (5 plays, 77 yards, 2:48)	LIB 31–26
4	05:03	LIB	Alex Barbir 32-yard field goal (10 plays, 61 yards, 5:31)	LIB 34–26
4	03:01	CCU	Greg Latushko 5-yard pass from Grayson McCall (Grayson McCall two-point conversion rush) (6 plays, 72 yards, 2:02)	TIE 34–34
1OT		LIB	Alex Barbir 44-yard field goal (4 plays, -1 yards)	LIB 37–34

Statistics	Liberty	Coastal Carolina
First downs	26	24
Total yards	475	483
Rushing yards	255	165
Passing yards	220	318
Turnovers	3	1
Time of possession	30:49	29:11

Team	Category	Player	Statistics
Liberty	Passing	Malik Willis	19/29, 220 yards, 2 INT
Liberty	Rushing	Malik Willis	21 carries, 137 yards, 4 TD
Liberty	Receiving	DJ Stubbs	5 receptions, 68 yards
Coastal Carolina	Passing	Grayson McCall	21/32, 318 yards, 3 TDs, 1 INT
Coastal Carolina	Rushing	Grayson McCall	15 carries, 96 yards, 1 TD
Coastal Carolina	Receiving	Jaivon Heiligh	13 receptions, 178 yards
