= 2020 UMass Minutemen football team =

American college football season

2020 UMass Minutemen football
- Conference: Independent
- Record: 0–4
- Head coach: Walt Bell (2nd season)
- Offensive scheme: Spread
- Defensive coordinator: Tommy Restivo (2nd season)
- Base defense: 4–3
- Home stadium: Warren McGuirk Alumni Stadium

2020 NCAA Division I FBS independents football records
	Conf.			Overall
Team	W		L	W		L
No. 11 BYU		–		11	–	1
No. 17 Liberty		–		10	–	1
Army		–		9	–	3
New Mexico State		–		1	–	1
UMass		–		0	–	4
Note: Due to COVID-19, UConn canceled the 2020 football season; New Mexico State was the only FBS school to play a spring schedule.; Rankings from AP Poll.

The 2020 UMass Minutemen football team represented the University of Massachusetts Amherst in the 2020 NCAA Division I FBS football season. The Minutemen competed as an independent. They were led by second-year head coach Walt Bell.

UMass originally announced on August 11, 2020, that they would not play football in the fall over concerns related to the COVID-19 pandemic. This decision was reversed on September 21, as UMass announced that opponents would be announced "as they become official". Although the Minutemen's home stadium was Warren McGuirk Alumni Stadium, all games there were cancelled; the team played only away games in 2020.

The Minutemen finished the abridged season winless, at 0–4, and were outscored by their opponents by a combined total of 161 to 12.

== Preseason ==
=== Award watch lists ===
Listed in the order that they were released.

Award	Player	Position	Year
Outland Trophy	Larnel Coleman	OL	RS SR
Wuerffel Trophy	Cole McCubrey	LB	SR
Wuerffel Trophy	Solomon Siskind	TE	RS JR

== Original Schedule ==
*All of these games were cancelled when UMass announced they would be forfeiting their season due to the COVID-19 pandemic, however, the Minutemen would reschedule their game at Liberty later in 2020.

Date	Time	Opponent	Site	TV	Result	Attendance
September 3		at UConn	Rentschler Field; East Hartford, CT (rivalry)			
September 12		Troy	Warren McGuirk Alumni Stadium; Amherst, MA			
September 19		Albany	Warren McGuirk Alumni Stadium; Amherst, MA			
September 26		at Appalachian State	Kidd Brewer Stadium; Boone, NC			
October 3		at New Mexico	Dreamstyle Stadium; Albuquerque, NM			
October 10		Temple	Warren McGuirk Alumni Stadium; Amherst, MA			
October 17		at Akron	InfoCision Stadium; Akron, OH			
October 24		FIU	Warren McGuirk Alumni Stadium; Amherst, MA			
November 7		New Mexico State	Warren McGuirk Alumni Stadium; Amherst, MA			
November 14		at Auburn	Jordan–Hare Stadium; Auburn, AL			
November 21		Army	Warren McGuirk Alumni Stadium; Amherst, MA			
November 28		at Liberty	Williams Stadium; Lynchburg, VA			
Rankings from AP Poll released prior to the game; All times are in Eastern time

== Schedule ==
UMass went 0–4, scoring 12 total points while allowing 161 points by their opponents.

Date	Time	Opponent	Site	TV	Result	Attendance
October 17	4:00 p.m.	at Georgia Southern	Paulson Stadium; Statesboro, GA	ESPN2	L 0–41	4,856
November 7	2:30 p.m.	at No. 16 Marshall	Joan C. Edwards Stadium; Huntington, WV	ESPN+	L 10–51	11,711
November 20	8:00 p.m.	at Florida Atlantic	FAU Stadium; Boca Raton, FL	CBSSN	L 2–24	5,554
November 27	12:00 p.m.	at Liberty	Williams Stadium; Lynchburg, VA	ESPN3	L 0–45	250
Rankings from AP Poll and CFP Rankings after November 24 released prior to game; All times are in Eastern time

== Game summaries ==
=== At Georgia Southern ===
Massachusetts at Georgia Southern

Team	1	2	3	4	Total
Minutemen	0	0	0	0	0
• Eagles	14	14	10	3	41

- Date: October 17, 2020
- Location: Paulson Stadium
  Statesboro, GA
- Game start: 4:07 p.m. EDT
- Elapsed time: 3 hours and 12 minutes
- Game attendance: 4,856
- Game weather: 65 °F (18 °C)
- Referee: Wayne Winkler
- TV announcers (ESPN2): Bill Roth (play–by–play) and Dustin Fox (analyst)

Scoring summary
1	12:18	GASO	Malik Murray 47-yard pass from Shai Werts (Alex Raynor kick) (5 plays, 75 yards, 2:42)	GASO 7–0
1	08:14	GASO	Beau Johnson 8-yard pass from Shai Werts (Alex Raynor kick) (7 plays, 39 yards, 1:57)	GASO 14–0
2	09:12	GASO	Beau Johnson 10-yard pass from Shai Werts (Alex Raynor kick) (7 plays, 50 yards, 4:13)	GASO 21–0
2	01:39	GASO	Shai Werts 4-yard rush (Alex Raynor kick) (8 plays, 60 yards, 5:01)	GASO 28–0
3	13:08	GASO	Alex Raynor 27-yard field goal (5 plays, 10 yards, 1:25)	GASO 31–0
3	06:40	GASO	Wesley Kennedy III 56-yard rush (Alex Raynor kick) (2 plays, 60 yards, 0:55)	GASO 38–0
4	02:34	GASO	Alex Raynor 31-yard field goal (4 plays, 8 yards, 2:18)	GASO 41–0

Statistics	UMass	Georgia Southern
First downs	10	20
Total yards	191	436
Rushing yards	111	308
Passing yards	80	128
Turnovers	2	1
Time of possession	29:09	30:51

Team	Category	Player	Statistics
UMass	Passing	Mike Fallon	7/12, 41 yards, 1 INT
UMass	Rushing	Will Koch	4 carries, 41 yards
UMass	Receiving	Samuel Emilus	4 receptions, 28 yards
Georgia Southern	Passing	Shai Werts	11/16, 128 yards, 3 TDs
Georgia Southern	Rushing	Wesley Kennedy III	6 carries, 106 yards, 1 TD
Georgia Southern	Receiving	Malik Murray	4 receptions, 68 yards, 1 TD

=== At Marshall ===
Massachusetts at Marshall

Team	1	2	3	4	Total
Minutemen	7	3	0	0	10
• No. 16 Thundering Herd	14	17	13	7	51

- Date: November 7, 2020
- Location: Joan C. Edwards Stadium
  Huntington, WV
- Game start: 2:30 p.m. EST
- Elapsed time: 2 hours and 55 minutes
- Game attendance: 11,711
- Game weather: Clear and Sunny • Temperature: 74 °F (23 °C) • Wind: Calm
- Referee: Rodney Burnette
- TV announcers (ESPN+): Mark Martin (play–by–play) and Jake Griffith (analyst)

Scoring summary
1	13:28	MRSH	Brenden Knox 45-yard rush (Shane Ciucci kick) (4 plays, 75 yards, 1:32)	MRSH 7–0
1	7:01	MASS	Samuel Emilus 2-yard pass from Will Koch (Jeremy Martin kick) (6 plays, 80 yards, 2:48)	TIED 7–7
1	2:02	MRSH	Brenden Knox 14-yard rush (Shane Ciucci kick) (11 plays, 82 yards, 4:59)	MRSH 14–7
2	9:52	MRSH	Corey Gammage 19-yard pass from Grant Wells (Shane Ciucci kick) (8 plays, 49 yards, 3:00)	MRSH 21–7
2	6:04	MRSH	Shane Ciucci 43-yard field goal (5 plays, 17 yards, 2:13)	MRSH 24–7
2	2:38	MASS	Jeremy Martin 46-yard field goal (8 plays, 46 yards, 3:26)	MRSH 24–10
2	0:38	MRSH	Sheldon Evans 11-yard rush (Shane Ciucci kick) (6 plays, 74 yards, 2:00)	MRSH 31–10
3	6:47	MRSH	Xavier Gaines 13-yard pass from Grant Wells (Shane Ciucci rush failed) (11 plays, 80 yards, 5:12)	MRSH 37–10
3	3:46	MRSH	Xavier Gaines 16-yard pass from Grant Wells (Shane Ciucci kick) (2 plays, 16 yards, 0:44)	MRSH 44–10
4	13:04	MRSH	Knowledge McDaniel 14-yard pass from Grant Wells (Shane Ciucci kick) (5 plays, 61 yards, 2:37)	MRSH 51–10

Statistics	UMass	Marshall
First downs	12	33
Total yards	190	495
Rushing yards	41	267
Passing yards	149	228
Turnovers	1	0
Time of possession	26:53	33:07

Team	Category	Player	Statistics
UMass	Passing	Will Koch	12/18, 99 yards, 1 TD
UMass	Rushing	Ellis Merriweather	10 carries, 31 yards
UMass	Receiving	Taylor Edwards	1 reception, 37 yards
Marshall	Passing	Grant Wells	21/30, 228 yards, 3 TDs
Marshall	Rushing	Brenden Knox	14 carries, 118 yards, 2 TDs
Marshall	Receiving	Artie Henry	5 receptions, 71 yards

=== At Florida Atlantic ===
Massachusetts at Florida Atlantic

Team	1	2	3	4	Total
Minutemen	0	0	2	0	2
• Owls	7	0	14	3	24

- Date: November 20, 2020
- Location: FAU Stadium
  Boca Raton, FL
- Game start: 8:00 p.m. EST
- Elapsed time: 3 hours and 11 minutes
- Game attendance: 5,554
- Game weather: 77 °F (25 °C) • Weather: Mostly Cloudy • Wind: ENE 20 MPH
- Referee: K. Antee
- TV announcers (CBS Sports Network): Jason Knapp (play-by-play) and Malik Zaire (analyst)

Scoring summary
1	10:58	FAU	BJ Emmons 1 yard run (Vladmir Rivas kick) (8 plays, 57 yards, 3:04)	FAU 7–0
3	06:47	FAU	Brandon Robinson 13 yard pass from Nick Tronti (Vladmir Rivas kick) (15 plays, 65 yards, 8:13)	FAU 14–0
3	04:27	FAU	Javion Posey 70 yard run (Vladmir Rivas kick) (1 play, 70 yards, 0:13)	FAU 21–0
3	01:55	UMASS	9 yard safety	FAU 21–2
4	04:58	FAU	Vladmir Rivas 30 yard field goal (5 plays, 53 yards, 1:53)	FAU 24–2

Statistics	UMass	Florida Atlantic
First downs	8	16
Total yards	147	368
Rushing yards	62	140
Passing yards	85	228
Turnovers	2	1
Time of possession	25:10	34:50

Team	Category	Player	Statistics
UMass	Passing	Will Koch	12/22, 67 yards, 1 INT
UMass	Rushing	Ellis Merriweather	11 carries, 48 yards
UMass	Receiving	Josiah Johnson	8 receptions, 42 yards
Florida Atlantic	Passing	Javion Posey	13/27, 203 yards
Florida Atlantic	Rushing	Javion Posey	19 carries, 90 yards, 1 TD
Florida Atlantic	Receiving	TJ Chase	4 receptions, 79 yards

=== At Liberty ===
Massachusetts at Liberty

Team	1	2	3	4	Total
Minutemen	0	0	0	0	0
• Flames	14	17	14	0	45

- Date: November 27, 2020
- Location: Williams Stadium
  Lynchburg, VA
- Game start: 12:05 p.m. EST
- Elapsed time: 2 hours and 55 minutes
- Game attendance: 250
- Game weather: Sunny • Temperature: 62 °F (17 °C) • Wind: E 4 MPH
- Referee: Riley Johnson
- Television network: ESPN3

Scoring summary
1	6:38	LIB	Kevin Shaa 31-yard pass from Malik Willis (Alex Barbir kick) (8 plays, 80 yards, 2:28)	LIB 7–0
1	1:12	LIB	Joshua Mack 59-yard run (2 plays, 72 yards, 0:28)	LIB 14–0
2	10:39	LIB	Michael Bollinger 13-yard pass from Malik Willis (Alex Barbir kick) (5 plays, 76 yards, 1:52)	LIB 21–0
2	4:41	LIB	Demario Douglas 41-yard pass from Malik Willis (Alex Barbir kick) (7 plays, 80 yards, 4:30)	LIB 28–0
2	0:02	LIB	Alex Barbir 24-yard field goal (7 plays, 55 yards, 0:37)	LIB 31–0
3	6:14	LIB	Malik Willis 54-yard run (Alex Barbir kick) (5 plays, 67 yards, 1:27)	LIB 38–0
3	0:26	LIB	Peytton Pickett 16-yard run (Alex Barbir kick) (3 plays, 41 yards, 1:35)	LIB 45–0

Statistics	UMass	Liberty
First downs	12	31
Total yards	227	629
Rushing yards	55	378
Passing yards	172	251
Turnovers	2	0
Time of possession	25:50	34:10

Team	Category	Player	Statistics
UMass	Passing	Garret Dzuro	9/22, 172 yards, 1 INT
UMass	Rushing	Cam Roberson	5 carries, 17 yards
UMass	Receiving	Samuel Emilus	4 receptions, 82 yards
Liberty	Passing	Malik Willis	16/24, 223 yards, 3 TD
Liberty	Rushing	Peytton Pickett	10 carries, 125 yards, 1 TD
Liberty	Receiving	DeMario Douglas	4 receptions, 68 yards, 1 TD
