= 2020 Charlotte 49ers football team =

American college football season

2020 Charlotte 49ers football
- Conference: Conference USA
- East Division
- Record: 2–4 (2–2 C-USA)
- Head coach: Will Healy (2nd season)
- Offensive coordinator: Mark Carney (1st season)
- Offensive scheme: Spread option
- Co-defensive coordinators: Brandon Cooper (2nd season); Marcus West (2nd season)
- Base defense: 4–2–5
- Home stadium: Jerry Richardson Stadium

2020 Conference USA football standings
	Conf.			Overall
Team	W		L	W		L
East Division
Marshall xy	4	–	1	7	–	3
Florida Atlantic	4	–	2	5	–	4
Western Kentucky	4	–	3	5	–	7
Charlotte	2	–	2	2	–	4
Middle Tennessee	2	–	4	3	–	6
FIU	0	–	3	0	–	5
West Division
UAB xy$	3	–	1	6	–	3
UTSA	5	–	2	7	–	5
Louisiana Tech	4	–	2	5	–	5
North Texas	3	–	4	4	–	6
Rice	2	–	3	2	–	3
Southern Miss	2	–	4	3	–	7
UTEP	0	–	4	3	–	5
Championship: UAB 22, Marshall 13
$ – Conference champion; x – Division champion/co-champions; y – Championship game participant; Note: Due to COVID-19, Old Dominion opted out of the season.

The 2020 Charlotte 49ers football team represented the University of North Carolina at Charlotte in the 2020 NCAA Division I FBS football season. The 49ers played their home games at Jerry Richardson Stadium in Charlotte, North Carolina, and competed in the East Division of Conference USA (C–USA). They were led by second-year head coach Will Healy.

== Coaching staff ==
On December 29, Offensive coordinator Alex Atkins officially left the program to become Offensive line coach at Florida State. On January 22, Quarterbacks coach Mark Carney was promoted to replace Atkins as Offensive coordinator, retaining Quarterbacks responsibilities as well. On February 10 two coaches were added to the 49ers staff to replace outgoing Linebackers coach and Special teams coordinator Max Thurmond. Richmond Defensive coordinator Adam Braithwaite joined the staff to coach Linebackers, and former ODU Running backs and Special teams coordinator Charles Bankins joined to oversee Special Teams. On February 17, Texas A&M alum and Offensive analyst Lee Grimes joined the staff to coach the Offensive line.

Name	Position	Seasons at Charlotte	Alma mater
Will Healy	Head coach	2	Richmond (2008)
Marcus West	Assistant Head coach/co-Defensive coordinator/Defensive line	2	Memphis (2005)
Mark Carney	Offensive coordinator/quarterbacks coach	2	Fordham (2004)
Brandon Cooper	Co-Defensive coordinator/Safeties	2	UT Martin (2007)
Charles Bankins	Special teams coordinator	1	James Madison (1994)
Adam Braithwaite	Linebackers coach	1	William and Mary (2002)
Sean Dawkins	Runningbacks coach/Run game coordinator	2	Troy (2007)
Lee Grimes	Offensive line coach	1	Texas A&M (2009)
Montario Hardesty	Wide receivers coach	2	Tennessee (2010)
Eddie Hicks	Cornerbacks coach	2	So Miss (2010)
Cody Woodiel	Tight ends coach	2	Troy (2012)

== Recruiting ==
=== Recruiting class ===
The following recruits and transfers have signed letters of intent or verbally committed to the Charlotte 49ers football program for the 2020 recruiting year.

College recruiting (2020)
Name	Hometown	School	Height	Weight	40^{‡}	Commit date
Donta Armstrong; TE	Charlotte, NC	Vance HS	6 ft 4 in (1.93 m)	245 lb (111 kg)	-	Sep 14, 2019
Donta Armstrong; TE	Recruit ratings: Scout: Rivals: 247Sports: ESPN:					
Panda Askew; OG	Greenville, NC	Conley HS	6 ft 2 in (1.88 m)	275 lb (125 kg)	-	Dec 16, 2019
Panda Askew; OG	Recruit ratings: Scout: Rivals: 247Sports: ESPN:					
Briston Bennett; DB	Franklin, TN	Battle Ground Academy	6 ft 0 in (1.83 m)	165 lb (75 kg)	-	Jul 27, 2019
Briston Bennett; DB	Recruit ratings: Scout: Rivals: 247Sports: ESPN:					
Ty'kieast Crawford; OT	Carthage, TX	Carthage HS	6 ft 5 in (1.96 m)	335 lb (152 kg)	-	Apr 15, 2020
Ty'kieast Crawford; OT	Recruit ratings: Scout: Rivals: 247Sports: ESPN:					
Trey Creamer; DB	Cartersville, GA	Cartersville HS	6 ft 0 in (1.83 m)	170 lb (77 kg)	-	Nov 2, 2019
Trey Creamer; DB	Recruit ratings: Scout: Rivals: 247Sports: ESPN:					
Comanche Francisco; DB	Tyrone, GA	Sandy Creek HS	6 ft 0 in (1.83 m)	180 lb (82 kg)	-	Aug 4, 2019
Comanche Francisco; DB	Recruit ratings: Scout: Rivals: 247Sports: ESPN:					
Dajeun Gibson; DB	Murfreesboro, TN	Blackman HS	6 ft 0 in (1.83 m)	185 lb (84 kg)	-	Oct 25, 2019
Dajeun Gibson; DB	Recruit ratings: Scout: Rivals: 247Sports: ESPN:					
Ashton Gist; OL	Senatobia, MS	Northwest Mississippi CC	6 ft 2 in (1.88 m)	310 lb (140 kg)	-	Dec 16, 2019
Ashton Gist; OL	Recruit ratings: Scout: Rivals: 247Sports: ESPN:					
Anthony Jackson; DB	Rock Hill, SC	Rock Hill HS	6 ft 0.5 in (1.84 m)	170 lb (77 kg)	-	Apr 27, 2020
Anthony Jackson; DB	Recruit ratings: Scout: Rivals: 247Sports: ESPN:					
Braylin Johnson; WR	Duncan, SC	Byrnes HS	6 ft 0 in (1.83 m)	170 lb (77 kg)	-	Oct 6, 2019
Braylin Johnson; WR	Recruit ratings: Scout: Rivals: 247Sports: ESPN:					
Jonathan King; OL	Greensboro, NC	Southeast Guilford HS	6 ft 3 in (1.91 m)	270 lb (120 kg)	-	Nov 12, 2019
Jonathan King; OL	Recruit ratings: Scout: 247Sports: ESPN:					
Chavon McEachern; RB	Fayetteville, NC	Trinity Christian School	6 ft 0 in (1.83 m)	185 lb (84 kg)	-	Nov 22, 2019
Chavon McEachern; RB	Recruit ratings: Scout: Rivals: 247Sports: ESPN:					
Desmond Morgan; DT	Kernersville, NC	R.B. Glenn HS	6 ft 2 in (1.88 m)	290 lb (130 kg)	-	Jul 21, 2019
Desmond Morgan; DT	Recruit ratings: Scout: Rivals: 247Sports: ESPN:					
Arabee Muslim; OT	Charlotte, NC	Mallard Creek HS	6 ft 3 in (1.91 m)	295 lb (134 kg)	-	Jun 24, 2019
Arabee Muslim; OT	Recruit ratings: Scout: Rivals: 247Sports: ESPN:					
Rayshaad Roddy; DT	Cincinnati, OH	Fond du Lac CC	6 ft 0 in (1.83 m)	253 lb (115 kg)	-	Feb 5, 2020
Rayshaad Roddy; DT	Recruit ratings: Scout: Rivals: 247Sports: ESPN:					
Dominique Shoffner; QB	Apex, NC	Monroe College	6 ft 0 in (1.83 m)	209 lb (95 kg)	-	Dec 15, 2019
Dominique Shoffner; QB	Recruit ratings: Scout: Rivals: 247Sports: ESPN:					
Darion Smith; DE/LB	Saint Louis, MO	Trinity Catholic HS	6 ft 4 in (1.93 m)	220 lb (100 kg)	-	Sep 9, 2019
Darion Smith; DE/LB	Recruit ratings: Scout: Rivals: 247Sports: ESPN:					
Lyndarious Strange; S/DB	Tallahassee, TN	North Florida Christian School	6 ft 2 in (1.88 m)	190 lb (86 kg)	-	Nov 22, 2019
Lyndarious Strange; S/DB	Recruit ratings: Scout: Rivals: 247Sports: ESPN:					
Taylor Thompson; TE	Prattville, AL	Prattville High School	6 ft 2 in (1.88 m)	220 lb (100 kg)	-	Dec 16, 2019
Taylor Thompson; TE	Recruit ratings: Scout: Rivals: 247Sports: ESPN:					
Elijah Turner; RB	Buford, GA	Buford High School	6 ft 0 in (1.83 m)	185 lb (84 kg)	-	Feb 4, 2020
Elijah Turner; RB	Recruit ratings: Scout: Rivals: 247Sports: ESPN:					
Shedrick Ursery; DB	Hialeah, FL	Champagnat Catholic School	6 ft 1 in (1.85 m)	170 lb (77 kg)	-	Oct 16, 2019
Shedrick Ursery; DB	Recruit ratings: Scout: Rivals: 247Sports: ESPN:					
Overall recruit ranking: Scout: 69 Rivals: 91 247Sports: 69 ESPN: N/A
‡ Refers to 40-yard dash; Note: In many cases, Scout, Rivals, 247Sports, On3, and ESPN may conflict in their listings of height, weight and 40 time.; In these cases, the average was taken. ESPN grades are on a 100-point scale.; Sources: "Charlotte Football Commitments". Rivals.; "2020 Charlotte Football Commits". Scout.; "ESPN". ESPN.; "Scout.com Team Recruiting Rankings". Scout.; "2020 Team Ranking". Rivals.com.

=== Key transfers ===
Player	Position	Previous	Home town	High school	Class	Height	Weight
Derek Boykins	Linebacker	S. Carolina	Concord, NC	Central Cabarrus HS	FR	6'-1"	224 lbs
Tre Harbison	Running back	N. Illinois	Shelby, NC	Crest HS	SR	5'-11"	208 lbs
Issac Hampton	Defensive tackle	Miami (OH)	Charlotte, NC	Mallard Creek HS	RJR	6'-0"	296 lbs
Hunter Kelly	Offensive lineman	Penn St.	Langhorne, PA	Neshaminy HS	RSR	6'-2"	310 lbs
Josiah So'a	Defensive tackle	Vanderbilt	San Diego, CA	Kearny HS	RJR	6'-2.5"	285 lbs
Antone Williams	Safety	Duke	Atlanta, GA	Woodward Academy	SO	6'-0"	170 lbs

=== Preferred walk-ons ===
Player	Position	Home Town	High school	Height	Weight
D.J. Bagwell	Offensive lineman	Kings Mountain, NC	Kings Mountain HS	6'-3"	295 lbs
Jake Clemons	Athlete	Christiansburg, VA	Christiansburg HS	'6-6"	220 lbs
Christopher Houston	Running back	Midlothian, VA	Fork Union	5'-9"	180 lbs
Whit Kane	Wide receiver	Wake Forest, NC	Heritage HS	5'-11"	165 lbs
Bryce Kennon	Wide receiver/Tight end	Waxhaw, NC	Marvin Ridge HS	'6-4"	210 lbs
Keegan Williams	Runningback	Mt. Pleasant, SC	Oceanside Collegiate Academy	'5-9"	185 lbs

== Players ==
=== Roster ===
2020 Charlotte 49ers football team roster
Players
Coaches
Offense

Pos.	#	Name	Class
QB	0	Trexler Ivey	Fr
QB	2	Dominique Schoffner	RJr
QB	3	Chris Reynolds (injured) (C)	RJr
WR	4	Cameron Dollar	RJr
RB	5	Aaron McAllister	RSr
WR	6	Tre’ Goode	So
WR	7	Braylin Johnson	Fr
WR	8	Rico Arnold	RSo
WR	9	Victor Tucker	RJr
QB	10	Daniel Ratliff	RSo
QB	11	Preston Brown	RFr
TE	12	Donta Armstrong	Fr
RB	13	Terrick Smalls Jr.	RSo
WR	14	Whit Kane (injured)	Fr
WR	15	Justin Jeffrey	RSo
WR	16	Kendric Blake	RFr
QB	17	Ford Werness	RSo
TE	18	Taylor Thompson	Fr
WR	19	Josh Curry	RSo
RB	20	Calvin Camp	RJr
RB	21	Elijah Turner (injured)	Fr
RB	22	Tre Harbison
WR	23	Micaleous Elder	So
WR	25	Chavon McEachern	Fr
RB	26	Dekerius Thompson	Fr
RB	27	Mckinley Nelson	Jr
TE	29	Rickey Kofed	RJr
RB	30	Keegan Williams	Fr
WR	32	Bryce Kennon	Fr
WR	33	Chris Houston	Fr
OL	52	Jonny King	Fr
OL	54	Gage Welborn	RSo
OL	55	Jaxon Hughes	RFr
OL	57	Ashton Gist	Jr
OL	63	Jacob Webb	RJr
OL	64	D.J. Bagwell	Fr
OL	68	Jaelin Fisher (C)	RSr
OL	69	Dejan Rasuo	RSo
OL	70	D'Mitri Emmanuel	RJr
OL	71	Arabee Muslim	Fr
OL	72	Cameron Clark	Fr
OL	75	Jonathan Timmons	RSr
OL	76	Ty'kieast Crawford	Fr
OL	78	Hunter Kelly
OL	79	Panda Askew	Fr
TE	80	Christian Roberson
WR	81	Tyler Ringwood	RSr
TE	82	Jaylen Williams	RFr
WR	83	Chris Wiggins	RSo
TE	84	Jake Clemons	Fr
TE	85	Ryan Carriere	RSr
TE	86	Moss Saccomanno	RJr
WR	87	Chylon Thomas	Jr
TE	88	Jacob Hunt	Jr
WR	89	Quinton Patten	RFr
WR	90	Austin Riley	Fr

Defense

Pos.	#	Name	Class
DB	0	Antone Williams
DB	1	Jacione Fugate	RSr
LB	2	Brelin Faison-Walden	Sr
DB	3	Trey Creamer	RJr
LB	4	Lance McMillian	RSo
LB	5	Tyler Murray	RJr
DB	6	Soloman Rogers	So
DB	7	Robert Cheatham	RSr
DB	8	Nafees Lyon
DE	10	Tyriq Harris (C)
DB	12	Shedrick Ursery	Fr
DB	13	Briston Bennett	Fr
LB	14	Derek Boykins	RFr
DB	15	Dajeun Gibson	Fr
DB	16	Comanche Francisco	Fr
LB	17	Luke Martin	Sr
LB	18	Prince Bemah (injured)	RFr
DB	21	LaDamion Hunt	RJr
DB	23	Matt Martinez	RSo
DB	24	Lacy Williams	RFr
DB	27	Bryson Whitehead	RFr
DB	28	Ben DeLuca (C)
DB	29	Jonnie Pitman	RSo
DB	30	Marcus Robitaille	So
DB	31	Trey Bly	RFr
LB	33	Jaylon Sharpe	So
LB	34	Javonte Misenheimer	RJr
DB	35	Myles Hunt	RSo
DB	36	Anthony Jackson	Fr
DB	38	Kendric Ivey	Jr
LB	39	George Maya	RJr
DE	40	Markees Watts (injured)	Jr
LB	42	Tiaseer Rambert	RFr
DB	43	Ryan Braithwaite	RJr
DE	44	Jaxon Hughes	RFr
DB	46	Dillon Overholt (injured)	RSo
DT	47	Khalil Presley	RSr
DT	48	Barutti Mazangu	Fr
DB	50	Darion Smith	Fr
LB	51	Peter Agabe	Sr
DL	53	Michael Kelly	RFr
DL	56	Jordan Moore	Fr
DL	57	Siah Sa'o
DL	58	Johnny Ray	RSr
LB	59	B.J. Turner	RSo
DL	60	Bryan Wallace	RSo
LB	66	Cole Hopkins	RSo
DL	74	Tim Baten	RJr
DL	90	Dez Morgan	Fr
DE	91	Corey Mobley	RJr
DL	92	Desmond Stewart	Sr
DE	93	Emmanuel White	RJr
DE	94	Isaiah Belk	RSo
DL	95	Rayshaad Roddy	Jr
DL	96	Isaac Hampton	RJr
DE	97	Damon Weldon	RSo
DL	98	Timmy Horne	RSr
DE	99	Taylor Chandler	RSo

Special teams

Pos.	#	Name	Class
K	11	Jonathan Cruz	Jr
P	19	Connor Bowler	RJr
K	37	Max Bilstein	RFr
LS	41	Doug McLaughlin	So
P	44	Zach Nicholson	RSo
LS	50	Colby Garfield	Fr

Head coach

- Will Healy (Richmond)

Coordinators/assistant coaches

- Marcus West (Memphis)
  Assistant head coach/co-Defensive coordinator/defensive line
- Charles Bankins (James Madison)
  Special teams coordinator
- Mark Carney (Fordham)
  Offensive coordinator/quarterbacks
- Brandon Cooper (UT Martin)
  Co-defensive coordinator/safeties
- Adam Braithwaite (William & Mary)
  Linebackers
- Sean Dawkins (Troy)
  Run Game Coordinator/running backs
- Lee Grimes (Texas A&M)
  Offensive line
- Montario Hardesty (Tennessee)
  Wide receivers
- Eddie Hicks (Southern Miss)
  Cornerbacks
- Cody Woodiel (Troy)
  Tight ends
- Winston DeLattiboudere III (Minnesota)
  Graduate assistant

Legend

- (C) Team captain
- (S) Suspended
- (I) Ineligible
- Injured
- Redshirt

Roster

=== Depth chart ===
Defense
4-2-5

NICKLE
BRELIN FAISON-WALDEN
Jaylon Sharpe

FS
Ben DeLuca
Antone Williams

SAM	MIKE
TYLER MURRAY	LUKE MARTIN
Solomon Rogers	B.J. Turner

SS
JA'CONE FUGATE
Briston Bennett

CB
LANCE MCMILLAN
Robert Cheathem

DE	DT	DT	DE
TYRIQ HARRIS	MIKEL HORTON	SIAH SA'O	MARKEES WATTS
Romeo McKnight	Bryan Wallace	Timmy Horne	Damon Weldon Jr.

CB
NAFEES LYON
Daj'eun Gibson

Offense
Pro-style

WR
VICTOR TUCKER
Tre Goode

WR
MICALEOUS ELDER
Justin Jeffrey

LT	LG	C	RG	RT
D’MITRI EMMANUEL	JOHNATHAN TIMMONS	JAELIN FISHER	ASHTON GIST	TY'KIEAST CRAWFORD
Dejan Rasuo	Gage Welborn	Hunter Kelly	Gage Welborn	Jon Jacobs

TE
RYAN CARRIERE
Donta Armstrong

WR
CAMERON DOLLAR
Rico Arnold

QB
CHRIS REYNOLDS
Dom Shoffner

Special teams
PK Jonathan Cruz
PK Max Blitstein
P Connor Bowler
P Zach Nicholson
KR Aaron McAllister
PR Nafees Lyon
LS Sam DeLuke
H Chris Reynolds

RB
Tre Harbison
Aaron McAllister

== Awards and honors ==
=== Preseason ===
Awards Watch List	Player	Position	Year
Biletnikoff Award	Victor Tucker	WR	JR
Outland Trophy	Jaelin Fisher	C	RSR
Wuerffel Trophy	Tyriq Harris	DE	Grad
Maxwell Award	Chris Reynolds	QB	RJR
Manning Award	Chris Reynolds	QB	RJR

Preseason All-CUSA Team	Player	Position	Year
Preseason All-Conference USA First Team	Ben DeLuca	S	RSR
Preseason All-Conference USA First Team	Markees Watts	DE	JR

=== In season ===
Awards Watch List	Player	Position	Year
Campbell Trophy Finalist	Tyriq Harris	DE	Grad
Wuerffel Trophy Semifinalist	Tyriq Harris	DE	Grad
Rimington Trophy	Jaelin Fisher	OL	RSR
FWAA Freshman all-America Watch List	Taylor Thompson	TE	FR

Award	Player	Position	Year	Game
Conference USA Defensive Player of the Week	Tyler Murray	LB	RJR	Appalachian State
Conference USA Offensive Player of the Week	Aaron McAllister	RB	RSR	North Texas

Wearing Jersey #49	Position	Game
D'Mitri Emmanuel	Offensive lineman	Appalachian State
Cameron Dollar	Wide receiver	Florida Atlantic
Luke Martin	Linebacker	North Texas
Jalen Allen	Offensive lineman	UTEP
Tyler Murray	Linebacker	Duke
		Western Kentucky

=== Postseason ===
Conference Award	Player	Position	Year
C-USA All-Academic Team	Tyriq Harris	DE	RSR
C-USA All-Academic Team	Tyriq Harris	DE	RSR
C-USA All-Conference Second Team	Victor Tucker	WR	RJR
C-USA All-Freshman Team	Colby Garfield	LS	FR
C-USA All-Freshman Team	Taylor Thompson	TE	FR

All Conference Honorable Mentions:

Offense: QB – Chris Reynolds, R-Jr. • RB – Aaron McAllister, R-Sr. • OL – Jaelin Fisher, R-Sr.

Defense: DT – Timmy Horne, R-Sr. • DE – Romeo McKnight, R-Sr. • DE – Tyriq Harris, R-Sr. • LB – Tyler Murray, R-Jr. • DB – Ben DeLuca, R-Sr.

Special Teams: P – Conner Bowler, R-Jr.

2021 East–West Shrine Bowl:

Participants: S - Ben DeLuca • DE - Romeo McKnight

2021 SPIRAL Tropical Bowl:

Participant: RB - Tre Harbison

2021 College Gridiron Showcase & Symposium:

Participants: RB - Aaron McAllister • OL - Jaelin Fisher

== Schedule ==
Charlotte originally had games scheduled against Norfolk State and Tennessee, which were canceled due to their respective conferences' decisions on the COVID-19 pandemic. The game with Duke was originally scheduled for Thursday September 17 but was moved to Saturday October 31.

On Saturday, August 8, it was announced that the 49ers would play the UNC Chapel Hill Tar Heels on September 19 in Chapel Hill. On August 10, fellow Conference USA member Old Dominion suspended all fall sports, creating another opening on the 49ers' schedule. Appalachian State was added to the schedule on August 12.

On September 14, the home opener against Georgia State was moved from a 6:00 p.m. to a noon start time and also moved from ESPN3 to ESPNU. On September 17, Charlotte announced they had canceled their game at North Carolina scheduled for September 19 due to the impact that contact tracing quarantine has had on a key position group. Several members of the Charlotte offensive line were placed into quarantine following the university's COVID-19 contact tracing protocols, effectively depleting that unit. On September 21 the Conference USA opener against Florida Atlantic was moved from a 6:00 p.m. to 4:00 p.m. start time and also moved from ESPN3 to ESPNU. On Friday, September 25, Georgia State postponed Charlotte's home opener the next day due to contact tracing issues with a player on their team testing positive for COVID-19. ESPNU picked up Charlotte's games against North Texas and the home opener against FIU, moving both games to 8:00 p.m. starting time. On October 15, FIU postponed their game at Charlotte due to COVID-19 contact tracing player availability issues, marking the sixth game lost for the 49ers in the season and the second time that the home opening was delayed.

On November 3 it was announced that Charlotte had added a home game with Gardner-Webb for November 14. On November 4 CUSA rescheduled the previously postponed FIU conference matchup to December 5. On November 6 Charlotte had to postpone its away game with Middle Tennessee after several players had positive COVID-19 tests. On November 13 Gardner-Webb canceled their game for the next day due to COVID-19 cases on their team. Charlotte postponed its game with Marshall on November 16 due to COVID-19 issues on the team. To clear COVID-19 related quarantine issues Charlotte's home game against Western Kentucky was moved to the following Tuesday morning, December 1, 2020, at 10:30 a.m. Charlotte had to postpone the rescheduled game with Western Kentucky on December 1, 2020, due to COVID-19 concerns. Conference USA canceled FIU's postponed game with Charlotte on December 5, 2020, and replaced them with WKU on December 6, 2020. Conference USA rescheduled the Marshall game for December 11, 2020. Marshall canceled the make-up match on December 9, 2020, due to COVID-19 concerns on their team, effectively ending the 49ers season at six games played.

Date	Time	Opponent	Site	TV	Result	Attendance
~~September 5~~	-	~~Tennessee~~*	~~Neyland Stadium~~; ~~Knoxville, TN~~		Canceled	–
~~September 12~~	-	~~Norfolk St.~~*	~~Jerry Richardson Stadium~~; ~~Charlotte, NC~~		Canceled	–
September 12	12:00 p.m.	at Appalachian State*	Kidd Brewer Stadium; Boone, NC	ESPN2	L 20–35	0
~~September 19~~	~~3:30 p.m.~~	~~at No. 11 UNC~~*	~~Kenan Stadium~~; ~~Chapel Hill, NC~~	~~ACCRSN~~	Canceled	–
~~September 26~~	~~12:00 p.m.~~	~~Georgia St.~~*	~~Jerry Richardson Stadium~~; ~~Charlotte, NC~~	~~ESPNU~~	Postponed	–
October 3	4:00 p.m.	at Florida Atlantic	FAU Stadium; Boca Raton, FL	ESPNU	L 17–21	5,657
October 10	8:00 p.m.	at North Texas	Apogee Stadium; Denton, TX	ESPNU	W 49–21	6,864
~~October 17~~	~~8:00 p.m.~~	~~FIU~~	~~Jerry Richardson Stadium~~; ~~Charlotte, NC~~	~~ESPNU~~	Postponed	–
October 24	12:00 p.m.	UTEP	Jerry Richardson Stadium; Charlotte, NC	ESPN+	W 38–28	1,042
October 31	7:00 p.m.	at Duke*	Wallace Wade Stadium; Durham, NC	ACCRSN	L 19–53	0
~~November 7~~	~~3:30 p.m.~~	~~Middle Tenn.~~	~~Johnny "Red" Floyd Stadium~~; ~~Murfreesboro, TN~~	~~ESPN+~~	Postponed	–
~~November 14~~		~~ODU~~	~~Jerry Richardson Stadium~~; ~~Charlotte, NC~~		Canceled	–
~~November 14~~	~~12:00 p.m.~~	~~Gardner-Webb~~*	~~Jerry Richardson Stadium~~; ~~Charlotte, NC~~	~~ESPN3~~	Canceled	–
~~November 21~~	~~12:30 p.m.~~	~~Marshall~~	~~Joan C. Edwards Stadium~~; ~~Huntington, WV~~		Postponed	–
~~November 28~~	~~7:00 p.m.~~	~~Western Kentucky~~	~~Jerry Richardson Stadium~~; ~~Charlotte, NC~~	~~CBSSN~~	Postponed	–
~~December 1~~	~~12:00 p.m.~~	~~Western Kentucky~~	~~Jerry Richardson Stadium~~; ~~Charlotte, NC~~	~~ESPN3~~	Postponed	–
~~December 5~~	~~12:00 p.m.~~	~~FIU~~	~~Jerry Richardson Stadium~~; ~~Charlotte, NC~~	~~ESPN+~~	Canceled	–
December 6	12:00 p.m.	Western Kentucky	Jerry Richardson Stadium; Charlotte, NC	ESPN3	L 19–37	714
~~December 11~~	~~12:00 p.m.~~	~~Marshall~~	~~Joan C. Edwards Stadium~~; ~~Huntington, WV~~		Canceled	–
*Non-conference game; Rankings from AP Poll and CFP Rankings after November 24 released prior to game; All times are in Eastern time

== Television ==
Charlotte 49ers home games and conference road games will be broadcast through Conference USA's television partners ESPN, CBS Sports, and Stadium.

== Radio ==
Radio coverage for all games is broadcast by IMG College through the Charlotte 49ers Radio Network flagship station WZGV ESPN Radio 730 AM The Game, and the TuneIn Charlotte 49ers IMG Sports Network app. The radio announcers are "Voice of the 49ers" Matt Swierad with play-by-play alongside NFL veteran Al Wallace providing color commentary and Bobby Rosinski and Walker Mehl with sideline reports.

== Preseason media poll ==
No Conference USA Preseason Media Poll has been released as of September 2, 2020.

== Game summaries ==
=== Appalachian State Mountaineers ===
Charlotte at Appalachian State

Team	1	2	3	4	Total
49ers	7	3	10	0	20
• Mountaineers	0	14	7	14	35

- Date: September 12, 2020
- Location: Kidd Brewer Stadium
  Boone, NC
- Game start: 12:00 p.m. EDT
- Elapsed time: 3 hours and 32 minutes
- Game attendance: 0
- Game weather: Temperature: 66 °F (19 °C) • Weather: Raining • Wind: 0 MPH
- Referee: Chris Bynum
- TV announcers (ESPN2): Bob Wischusen, Dan Orlovsky and Lericia Harris (sideline)

Scoring summary
1	4:30	CHAR	Tre HARBINSON 14 Yd Run (Jonathan CRUZ kick)	CHAR 7–0
2	12:18	APP	Camerun PEOPLES 16 Yd Run (Chandler STATON kick)	TIED 7-7
2	4:50	APP	Marcus WILLIAMS Jr. 1 Yd Run (Chandler STATON kick)	APP 14-7
2	1:52	CHAR	Jonathan CRUZ 23 Yd Field Goal	APP 14-10
3	3:15	CHAR	Jonathan CRUZ 49 Yd Field Goal	APP 14-13
3	1:51	APP	Thomas HENNIGAN 52 Yd pass from Zac THOMAS (Chandler STATON kick)	APP 21-13
3	1:35	CHAR	Aaron MCALLISTER 97 Yd Kickoff Return (Jonathan CRUZ kick)	APP 21-20
4	10:08	APP	Daetrich HARRINGTON 4 Yd Run (Chandler STATON kick)	APP 28-20
4	1:15	APP	Daetrich HARRINGTON 15 Yd Run (Chandler STATON kick)	APP 35-20

Charlotte would strike first with a Tre Harbison run into the end zone but App would tie the game and then go up a touchdown in the second quarter. Jonathan Cruz would tack on a field goal before the half leaving App with only a four-point lead. The fog and rain would continue to plague both teams in the nearly empty stadium as Cruz would add another field goal late in the third to bring the score difference to a single digit, but on the next series App stretched the lead back out to eight points only to have Charlotte's Aaron McAllister get it back to within a point on a 97-yard kick off return. App would again take their lead out to eight points early in the fourth quarter as Charlotte still couldn't find its offensive rhythm in the second half. A late touchdown by App made the score difference fifteen points but didn't change the outcome of the game as the 49ers would drop the season opener 20 to 35.

Top performances were dominated by the Mountaineers and included quarterback Zac Thomas who passed for 204 yards and 1 touchdown with 1 interception. Running back Marcus Williams had 14 carries for 117 yards and a touchdown. Receiver Thomas Hennigan had 5 receptions for 120 yards and a touchdown.

Game notes:

- Aaron McAllister's 3rd quarter 97 yard kickoff return set a new program record in that category, topping Mike Hunter's 96-yard return in the Chowan game in 2013.
- McAllister now owns two program records, longest kickoff return and longest run (89 yards at WKU in 2017).
- Game attendance by non-game officials, teams and players was prohibited by the state government due to the COVID-19 pandemic.
- Troy transfer redshirt junior linebacker Tyler Murray capped an impressive debut in Niner green with a Conference USA Defensive Player of the Week Award.
- The ESPN broadcast crew created a minor controversy complaining about the supposed lack of contrasting colors for Charlotte's new away jersey numbers.
- Additional controversy occurred after the game when an Appalachian State assistant coach posed with App. St. players displaying obscene hand gestures while holding a Charlotte related sign. App. St. Head Coach Shawn Clark would call Charlotte Coach Will Healy to offer an apology for the incident.

=== Florida Atlantic Owls ===
Charlotte at Florida Atlantic

Team	1	2	3	4	Total
49ers	10	0	0	7	17
• Owls	0	0	21	0	21

- Date: October 3, 2020
- Location: FAU Stadium
  Boca Raton, FL
- Game start: 4:02 p.m. EDT
- Elapsed time: 3 hours and 20 minutes
- Game attendance: 5,657
- Game weather: Temperature: 85 °F (29 °C) • Weather: Drizzle • Wind: SSE 10 MPH
- Referee: Billy Williams
- TV announcers (ESPNU): Mike Corey and Jay Walker

Scoring summary
1	6:13	CHAR	Jonathan CRUZ 43 Yd Field Goal	CHAR 3-0
1	1:36	CHAR	Cameron DOLLAR 39 Yd pass from Chris REYNOLDS (Jonathan CRUZ Kick)	CHAR 10-0
3	8:16	FAU	Nick TRONTI 49 Yd Run (Vladimir RIVAS Kick)	CHAR 10-7
3	2:57	FAU	Logan PETERSON 25 Yd pass from Nick TRONTI (Vladimir RIVAS Kick)	FAU 14-10
3	1:57	FAU	T.J. CHASE 16 Yd pass from Nick TRONTI (Vladimir RIVAS Kick)	FAU 21-10
4	13:00	CHAR	Tre HARBISON III 1 Yd Run (Jonathan CRUZ Kick)	FAU 21-17

Charlotte would open conference play after two unexpected weeks off visiting their second defending conference champs. Charlotte would go up by 10 points in the 1st quarter, but two long missed field goals by Jonathan Cruz, one in the 2nd quarter and the other off the first drive of the 3rd quarter, would come back to hurt the Niners later. After a scoreless 2nd quarter Charlotte would take a shutout lead into the halftime. Shortly before the halfway point of the 3rd quarter the Owls would finally find the end zone and with under 3 minutes left in the quarter would find it again for their first lead. A Charlotte fumble on the next series would give FAU their third touchdown of the quarter. Early in the 4th quarter Charlotte would get the game into a single score affair again. Charlotte would get into the redzone on the final drive of the game but two sacks of Chris Reynolds would lead to time running out as the Niners would lose 17 to 21.

FAU quarterback Nick Tronti would dominate passing and rushing yards with 98 yards through the air for 2 touchdowns and 10 carries for 94 yards on the ground and a third touchdown. T.J. Chase would have 3 receptions for 31 yards and a touchdown.

Game notes:

- First time in the 6-game series that the home team has won.
- Chris Reynolds would become the 2nd 49er to cross the 4000 passing yard career mark (4191 yards), second only to Matt Johnson's 5405 passing yards.
- Reynolds would become the 2nd Niner to throw for more than 300 yards in a game for the 3rd time (314 yards). Johnson holds the record with 4 games of more than 300 passing yards.
- Victor Tucker recorded his 9th career game with more than 100 receiving yards, 2nd all time to Austin Duke who holds the record with 13 100 yard games.

=== North Texas Mean Green ===
Charlotte at North Texas

Team	1	2	3	4	Total
• 49ers	7	14	14	14	49
Mean Green	0	7	7	7	21

- Date: October 10, 2020
- Location: Apogee Stadium
  Denton, TX
- Game start: 7:02 p.m. CDT
- Elapsed time: 3 hours and 34 minutes
- Game attendance: 6,864
- Game weather: Temperature: 85 °F (29 °C) • Weather: Clear • Wind: SE 3 MPH
- Referee: Rodney Burnette
- TV announcers (ESPNU): Roy Philpott and Kelly Stouffer

Scoring summary
1	4:34	CHAR	Chris REYNOLDS 18 Yd pass from Dom SHOFFNER (Jonathan CRUZ Kick)	CHAR 7-0
2	14:06	CHAR	Aaron MCALLISTER 71 Yd pass from Chris REYNOLDS (Jonathan CRUZ Kick)	CHAR 14-0
2	12:16	UNT	Jaelon Darden 28 Yd pass from Austin Aune (Ethan MOONEY Kick)	CHAR 14-7
2	3:21	CHAR	Tre HARBISON III 11 Yd Run (Jonathan CRUZ Kick)	CHAR 21-7
3	11:47	CHAR	Chavon MCEACHERN 1 Yd Run (Jonathan CRUZ Kick)	CHAR 28-7
3	10:54	UNT	Jaelon DARDEN 43 Yd pass from Austin AUNE (Ethan MOONEY Kick)	CHAR 28-14
3	4:10	CHAR	Taylor THOMPSON 15 Yd pass from Chris REYNOLDS (Jonathan CRUZ Kick)	CHAR 35-14
4	12:06	UNT	Jaelon DARDEN 9 Yd pass from Austin AUNE (Ethan MOONEY Kick)	CHAR 35-21
4	11:08	CHAR	Aaron MCALLISTER 66 Yd Run (Jonathan CRUZ Kick)	CHAR 42-21
4	9:51	CHAR	Calvin CAMP 14 Yd Run (Jonathan CRUZ Kick)	CHAR 49-21

North Texas was looking to avenge their 1-point loss to the 49ers from the previous year, but Charlotte would score on their first possession of the game and lead through to the end of regulation. North Texas would get the game to within a single score in the 2nd quarter, but Charlotte would steadily begin to pull away over the course of the rest of the game despite North Texas putting up substantial numbers behind the scoring combo of Aune and Darden.

North Texas Quarterback Austin Aune passed for 382 yards, 3 touchdowns and an interception. Charlotte rusher Aaron McAllister had 12 carries for 140 yards and a touchdown. The Mean Green's Jaelon Darden had 13 receptions for 244 yards and 3 touchdowns.

Game notes:

- 49 points are the most Charlotte has scored against a Conference USA opponent.
- Charlotte also set new conference single game records for touchdowns (7) and total yards of offense (599).
- Aaron McAllister's 140 yard performance moved him into 3rd place all-time in rushing for the 49ers with 1,404 career yards on the ground.
- McAllister's performance earned him the Conference USA Offensive Player of the Week Award.
- Victor Tucker moved into 2nd place in all-time 49ers receiving yards with 1,798 career yards.

=== UTEP Miners ===
UTEP at Charlotte

Team	1	2	3	4	Total
Miners	7	7	0	14	28
• 49ers	7	7	7	17	38

- Date: October 24, 2020
- Location: Jerry Richardson Stadium
  Charlotte, NC
- Game start: 12:05 p.m. EDT
- Elapsed time: 3 hours and 16 minutes
- Game attendance: 1,042
- Game weather: Temperature: 65 °F (18 °C) • Weather: Sunny • Wind: 0 MPH
- Referee: Jonathan Noli
- TV announcers (ESPN+): Dave Friedman and Reggie Walker

Scoring summary
1	12:20	CHAR	Aaron MCALLISTER 7 Yd Run (Jonathan CRUZ Kick)	CAR 7-0
1	3:29	UTEP	Deion HANKINS 2 Yd Run (Gavin BAECHLE Kick)	TIED 7-7
2	5:35	UTEP	Ronald AWATT 4 Yd Run (Gavin BAECHLE Kick)	UTEP 14-7
2	0:26	CHAR	Victor TUCKER 22 Yd pass from Chris REYNOLDS (Jonathan CRUZ Kick)	TIED 14-14
3	3:31	CHAR	Cameron DOLLAR 10 Yd pass from Chris REYNOLDS (Jonathan CRUZ Kick)	CHAR 21-14
4	12:42	CHAR	Jonathan CRUZ 32 Yd Field Goal	CHAR 24-14
4	4:40	CHAR	Micaleous ELDER 13 Yd Run (Jonathan CRUZ Kick)	CHAR 31-14
4	2:43	UTEP	Justin GARRETT 8 Yd pass from Gavin HARDISON (Gavin BAECHLE Kick)	CHAR 31-21
4	2:30	CHAR	Aaron MCALLISTER 36 Yd Run (Jonathan CRUZ Kick)	CHAR 38-21
4	0:53	UTEP	Justin GARRETT 11 Yd pass from Gavin HARDISON (Gavin BAECHLE Kick)	CHAR 38-28

Charlotte's long delayed home opener finally occurred as the Miners looked to avenge their home loss from the previous season to the "other" pick axe wielding team. Charlotte would strike first but UTEP would flip the lead near the half before Charlotte's late score had both teams tied at the break. The second half didn't get rolling until late in the third quarter when Charlotte would regain the lead. Charlotte would pad their lead with a Jonathan Cruz field goal early in the final quarter. With less than five minutes left in the game both offenses would suddenly come alive in a flurry of five late touchdowns, but their three turnovers in this game would keep the Miners fruitless all-time in the Eastern Time Zone as Charlotte would get the opening home win, 38 to 28.

Top performances of the game include Charlotte's Chris Reynolds, who threw for 185 yards and 2 touchdowns. The 49ers' Aaron McAllister would have 68 yards on 8 carries with 2 touchdowns. UTEP's Justin Garett had 9 receptions for 107 yards and 2 touchdowns.

Game Notes:

- UTEP is now 0-26-1 in the Eastern Time Zone All-time.
- Ben DeLuca's 9 tackles in the game made him the 2nd 49er to cross the 300 career tackles mark, six tackles shy of Jeff Gemmell's record set during the previous season.

=== Duke Blue Devils ===
Charlotte at Duke

Team	1	2	3	4	Total
49ers	0	7	6	6	19
• Blue Devils	17	7	13	16	53

- Date: October 31, 2020
- Location: Wallace Wade Stadium
  Durham, NC
- Game start: 7:05 p.m. EDT
- Elapsed time: 3:23
- Game attendance: 0
- Game weather: Temperature: 47 °F (8 °C) • Weather: Mostly Clear • Wind: SE 3 MPH
- Referee: Kevin Randall
- TV announcers (ACCRSN): Tom Werme, James Bates, and Kelly Crull

Scoring summary
1	14:35	DUKE	Deon JACKSON 65 Yd Run (Charlie HAM Kick)	DUKE 7-0
1	6:10	DUKE	Mataeo DURANT 3 Yd Run (Charlie HAM Kick)	DUKE 14-0
1	2:01	DUKE	Charlie HAM 32 Yd Field Goal	DUKE 17-0
2	12:17	DUKE	Mataeo DURANT 10 Yd Run (Charlie HAM Kick)	DUKE 24-0
2	4:21	CHAR	Micaleous ELDER 5 Yd Run (Jonathan CRUZ Kick)	DUKE 24-7
3	10:38	DUKE	Deon JACKSON 5 Yd Run (Charlie HAM Kick)	DUKE 31-7
3	5:50	CHAR	Victor TUCKER 6 Yd pass from Chris REYNOLDS (Two-Point Run Conversion Failed)	DUKE 31-13
3	2:35	DUKE	Jalon CALHOUN 8 Yd pass from Chase Brice (Charlie HAM PAT failed)	DUKE 37-13
4	10:06	CHAR	Tre HARBINSON III 2 Yd Run (Two-Point Run Conversion Failed)	DUKE 37-19
4	10:06	DUKE	Jeremiah LEWIS Defensive PAT Conversion	DUKE 39-19
4	4:17	DUKE	Jordan WATERS 2 Yd Run (Charlie HAM Kick)	DUKE 46-19
4	1:02	DUKE	Gunnar HOLMBERG 1 Yd Run (Charlie HAM Kick)	DUKE 53-19

Duke scored quickly and often to defend their home field, going up 24 points before Charlotte could answer with their own first touchdown shortly before the half. Duke would continue to trade scores and defend their lead into the fourth quarter when a second scoring explosion from the Blue Devils put the comeback hopes of the 49ers permanently to rest. The final score was Duke 53 to Charlotte's 19.

Top performances for the game included Charlotte's Chris Reynolds, who threw for 171 yards and a touchdown. Duke's Mataeo Durant had 12 carries for 104 yards and 2 touchdowns. The Blue Devil's Jalon Calhoun had 4 receptions for 36 yards and a touchdown.

Game notes:

- Charlotte dominated time of possession with the ball in their hands for more than 42 minutes of the game.
- The 17-play drive that resulted in Charlotte's first touchdown of the game is the longest drive in program history.
- Ben DeLuca's 6 tackles in the game tied him with Jeff Gemmell's 306 tackles for the 49ers all-time tackles record.
- Tyler Murray's 8 solo tackles in the game has given him 42 tackles on the season (23 solo tackles).
- Markees Watts' sack in this game moved him past 10 career sacks. The only 49ers previously with greater than 10 career sacks are NFL players Alex Highsmith and Larry Ogunjobi.
- Chris Reynolds became the first 49er to pass for 1000 yards in three seasons.

=== Western Kentucky Hilltoppers ===
Western Kentucky at Charlotte

Team	1	2	3	4	Total
• Hilltoppers	3	14	10	10	37
49ers	0	0	7	12	19

- Date: December 6, 2020
- Location: Jerry Richardson Stadium
  Charlotte, NC
- Game start: 12:05 p.m. EDT
- Elapsed time: 3:13
- Game attendance: 714
- Game weather: Temperature: 49 °F (9 °C) • Weather: Clear • Wind: 0 MPH
- Referee: Jonathan Noli
- TV announcers (ESPN3): Bobby Rosinski, Reggie Walker

Scoring summary
1	2:47	WKU	Brayden NARVESON 33 Yd Field Goal	WKU 3-0
2	14:44	WKU	A.J. BRATHWAITE Jr. 2 Yd Fumble Return (Brayden NARVESON Kick)	WKU 10-0
2	0:19	WKU	Jordan MEREDITH 0 Yd Fumble Return (Brayden NARVESON Kick)	WKU 17-0
3	9:30	CHAR	Micaleous Elder 5 Yd pass from Chris REYNOLDS (Jonathan CRUZ Kick)	WKU 17-7
3	7:18	WKU	Brayden NARVESON 46 Yd Field Goal	WKU 20-7
3	3:16	WKU	Mitchell TINSLEY 3 Yd pass from Tyrrell PIGROME (Brayden NARVESON Kick)	WKU 27-7
4	14:44	WKU	Brayden NARVESON 49 Yd Field Goal	WKU 30-7
4	5:01	CHAR	Cameron DOLLAR 30 Yd pass from Chris REYNOLDS (Two-Point Pass Conversion Failed)	WKU 30-13
4	2:22	WKU	C.J. JONES 5 Yd Run (Brayden NARVESON Kick)	WKU 37-13
4	0:31	CHAR	Micaleous ELDER 14 Yd pass from Dom SHOFFNER (Two-Point Pass Conversion Failed)	WKU 37-19

The game got off to a slow start with the Hilltoppers' Brayden Narveson getting his first of the days' three field goals for himself in the first quarter. Two devastating fumbles to bookend the second quarter would both result in Western Kentucky touchdowns, putting the 49ers in a sizable scoreless hole going into the half. Charlotte would find the endzone early in the third quarter to get on the board, but the Hilltoppers would never look back as they held the lead for the entire game.

Top performances of the game included Charlotte Quarterback Chris Reynolds, who threw for 205 yards and 2 touchdowns. The Hilltoppers' Gaej Walker racked up 98 yards on the ground behind 19 carries. The 49ers' Victor Tucker pulled in 8 receptions for 111 yards.

Game notes:

- Originally scheduled for November 28 but was postponed by Charlotte due to COVID-19 related issues.
- Rescheduled game would also be postponed from December 1 to December 6.
- Ben DeLuca's seven tackles in the game moved him past Jeff Gemmell into the number 1 spot for career tackles with 313.
- Victor Tucker's eight game catches made him the 2nd 2,000 yard career receiver for the 49ers behind Austin Duke.
- Chris Reynolds became the 2nd 49er QB to pass for more than 5,000 yards in his career behind Matt Johnson.
- 16 seniors played their final game for the 49ers on this Senior Day.
- First Sunday game in program history.
- First time Charlotte has played a regular season game in the month of December.
- First time Charlotte has had a greater than one week break in playing during a season. In this case five weeks.
- Charlotte did not play for the entirety of the month of November.

== Attendance ==
Due to the loss of the Norfolk State and ODU games Charlotte lost two of their normally six scheduled home games. Due to UNC Charlotte cancelling in-person classes until at least October 1, 2020; it was announced that no attendance would be allowed for the first home game against Georgia State on September 26, 2020. Charlotte's home games were effectively cut in half when Georgia State postponed Charlotte's home opener on September 26 due to contact tracing issues on their team with a COVID-19 positive tested player. With the state government announcement at the beginning of October that large venue gatherings could begin at 7% venue capacity, the 49ers announced that for their two October home games (FIU and UTEP) they would allow a maximum capacity in Jerry Richardson Stadium of 1,047 persons, to be limited to players' and coaches' family members, special guests of the university, and students. Attendance remained limited to 1,047 persons for the rescheduled WKU game in December. Charlotte would finish the season with only two home games both with restricted attendance.

Season	Games	Sellouts	W–L (%)	Attendance	Average	Best
2020	2	0	1–1 (.500)	1,756	878	1,042
