= 2020 Florida Atlantic Owls football team =

American college football season

2020 Florida Atlantic Owls football

Montgomery Bowl, L 10–25 vs. Memphis
- Conference: Conference USA
- East Division
- Record: 5–4 (4–2 C-USA)
- Head coach: Willie Taggart (1st season)
- Co-offensive coordinators: Clint Trickett (1st season); Drew Mehringer (1st season)
- Offensive scheme: Multiple
- Defensive coordinator: Jim Leavitt (1st season)
- Base defense: 3–4
- Home stadium: FAU Stadium

2020 Conference USA football standings
| | Conf. | | | Overall |
| Team | W | | L | W | | L |
|---|---|---|---|---|---|---|
East Division
| Marshall xy | 4 | – | 1 | 7 | – | 3 |
| Florida Atlantic | 4 | – | 2 | 5 | – | 4 |
| Western Kentucky | 4 | – | 3 | 5 | – | 7 |
| Charlotte | 2 | – | 2 | 2 | – | 4 |
| Middle Tennessee | 2 | – | 4 | 3 | – | 6 |
| FIU | 0 | – | 3 | 0 | – | 5 |
West Division
| UAB xy$ | 3 | – | 1 | 6 | – | 3 |
| UTSA | 5 | – | 2 | 7 | – | 5 |
| Louisiana Tech | 4 | – | 2 | 5 | – | 5 |
| North Texas | 3 | – | 4 | 4 | – | 6 |
| Rice | 2 | – | 3 | 2 | – | 3 |
| Southern Miss | 2 | – | 4 | 3 | – | 7 |
| UTEP | 0 | – | 4 | 3 | – | 5 |
Championship: UAB 22, Marshall 13
$ – Conference champion; x – Division champion/co-champions; y – Championship game participant; Note: Due to COVID-19, Old Dominion opted out of the season.

The 2020 Florida Atlantic Owls football team represented Florida Atlantic University in the 2020 NCAA Division I FBS football season. The Owls played their home games at FAU Stadium in Boca Raton, Florida, and competed in the East Division of Conference USA (CUSA). They were led by head coach Willie Taggart, in his first year.

== Preseason ==
=== Awards ===
Listed in the order that they were released

| Player | Position | Year |
|---|---|---|
| Desmond Noel | OL | Senior |

=== CUSA media days ===
The CUSA Media Days was held virtually for the first time in conference history.

== Schedule ==
Florida Atlantic announced its 2020 football schedule on January 8, 2020. The 2020 schedule originally consisted of 6 home and 6 away games in the regular season.

The Owls had games scheduled against Minnesota, Old Dominion, Stony Brook, and Middle Tennessee which were canceled due to the COVID-19 pandemic.

The Owls also had games scheduled against Georgia Southern, South Florida, and Southern Miss, which were postponed due to the pandemic. The Georgia Southern game was rescheduled for December 5 and the Southern Miss game is now rescheduled for December 10. They also added a new game against UMass on November 20 to replace their canceled game against Old Dominion, which was previously scheduled for that same weekend.

| Date | Time | Opponent | Site | TV | Result | Attendance |
|---|---|---|---|---|---|---|
| October 3 | 4:00 p.m. | Charlotte | FAU Stadium; Boca Raton, FL | ESPNU | W 21–17 | 5,657 |
| October 24 | 2:30 p.m. | at No. 22 Marshall | Joan C. Edwards Stadium; Huntington, WV | Stadium | L 9–20 | 12,002 |
| October 31 | 12:00 p.m. | UTSA | FAU Stadium; Boca Raton, FL | Stadium | W 24–3 | 5,026 |
| November 7 | 6:00 p.m. | Western Kentucky | FAU Stadium; Boca Raton, FL | Stadium | W 10–6 | 5,292 |
| November 13 | 7:00 p.m. | at FIU | Riccardo Silva Stadium; Miami, FL (Shula Bowl) | CBSSN | W 38–19 | 0 |
| November 20 | 8:00 p.m. | UMass* | FAU Stadium; Boca Raton, FL | CBSSN | W 24–2 | 5,554 |
| December 5 | 6:00 p.m. | at Georgia Southern* | Paulson Stadium; Stateboro, GA | ESPN+ | L 3–20 | 3,867 |
| December 10 | 6:30 p.m. | at Southern Miss | M. M. Roberts Stadium; Hattiesburg, MS | CBSSN | L 31–45 | 0 |
| December 23 | 7:00 p.m. | vs. Memphis* | Cramton Bowl; Montgomery, AL (Montgomery Bowl) | ESPN | L 10–25 | 2,979 |
*Non-conference game; Rankings from AP Poll and CFP Rankings after November 24 released prior to game; All times are in Eastern time

Schedule source:

== Game summaries ==
=== Charlotte ===
Charlotte at Florida Atlantic

| Team | 1 | 2 | 3 | 4 | Total |
|---|---|---|---|---|---|
| 49ers | 10 | 0 | 0 | 7 | 17 |
| • Owls | 0 | 0 | 21 | 0 | 21 |

- Date: October 3, 2020
- Location: FAU Stadium
  Boca Raton, FL
- Game start: 4:02 p.m. EDT
- Elapsed time: 3 hours and 20 minutes
- Game attendance: 5,657
- Game weather: 85 °F (29 °C) • Weather: Drizzle • Wind: SSE 10 MPH
- Referee: Billy Williams
- TV announcers (ESPNU): Mike Corey (play–by–play) and Jay Walker (analyst)

Scoring summary
| 1 | 06:13 | CHAR | Jonathan Cruz 43-yard field goal (13 plays, 53 yards, 6:44) | CHAR 3–0 |
| 1 | 01:36 | CHAR | Cameron Dollar 39-yard pass from Chris Reynolds (Jonathan Cruz kick) (2 plays, 51 yards, 0:53) | CHAR 10–0 |
| 3 | 08:16 | FAU | Nick Tronti 49-yard rush (Vladimir Rivas kick) (6 plays, 73 yards, 2:35) | CHAR 10–7 |
| 3 | 02:57 | FAU | Logan Peterson 25-yard pass from Nick Tronti (Vladimir Rivas kick) (5 plays, 80 yards, 1:48) | FAU 14–10 |
| 3 | 01:57 | FAU | T. J. Chase 16-yard pass from Nick Tronti (Vladimir Rivas kick) (1 play, 16 yards, 0:06) | FAU 21–10 |
| 4 | 13:00 | CHAR | Tre Harbison III 1-yard rush (Jonathan Cruz kick) (10 plays, 75 yards, 3:57) | FAU 21–17 |

| Statistics | Charlotte | Florida Atlantic |
|---|---|---|
| First downs | 22 | 15 |
| Total yards | 396 | 315 |
| Rushing yards | 82 | 217 |
| Passing yards | 314 | 98 |
| Turnovers | 1 | 0 |
| Time of possession | 37:49 | 22:11 |

| Team | Category | Player | Statistics |
|---|---|---|---|
| Charlotte | Passing | Chris Reynolds | 24/32, 314 yards, 1 TD |
| Charlotte | Rushing | Tre Harbison III | 17 carries, 49 yards, 1 TD |
| Charlotte | Receiving | Victor Tucker | 9 receptions, 118 yards |
| Florida Atlantic | Passing | Nick Tronti | 11/22, 98 yards, 2 TDs |
| Florida Atlantic | Rushing | Nick Tronti | 10 carries, 94 yards, 1 TD |
| Florida Atlantic | Receiving | T. J. Chase | 3 receptions, 31 yards, 1 TD |

=== At Marshall ===
Florida Atlantic at Marshall

| Team | 1 | 2 | 3 | 4 | Total |
|---|---|---|---|---|---|
| Owls | 0 | 6 | 3 | 0 | 9 |
| • No. 22 Thundering Herd | 7 | 0 | 10 | 3 | 20 |

- Date: October 24, 2020
- Location: Joan C. Edwards Stadium
  Huntington, WV
- Game start: 2:30 p.m. EDT
- Elapsed time: 3 hours and 11 minutes
- Game attendance: 12,002
- Game weather: 52 °F (11 °C) • Weather: Cloudy • Wind: S 6 MPH
- Referee: Rodney Burnette
- TV announcers (Stadium): Chris Hassel (play-by-play) and A. J. Hawk (analyst)

Scoring summary
| 1 | 05:40 | MRSH | Brenden Knox 58 yard pass from Grant Wells (Shane Ciucci kick) (5 plays, 79 yards, 2:08) | MRSH 7–0 |
| 2 | 02:28 | FAU | Malcolm Davidson 11 yard rush (Vladimir Rivas PAT blocked) (12 plays, 65 yards, 5:53) | MRSH 7–6 |
| 3 | 8:12 | FAU | Vladimir Rivas 43 yard field goal (11 plays, 52 yards, 6:48) | FAU 9–7 |
| 3 | 6:24 | MRSH | Artie Henry 41 yard pass from Grant Wells (Shane Ciucci kick) (4 plays, 81 yards, 1:48) | MRSH 14–9 |
| 3 | 3:13 | MRSH | Shane Ciucci 35 yard field goal (7 plays, 29 yards, 2:25) | MRSH 17–9 |
| 4 | 10:53 | MRSH | Shane Ciucci 22 yard field goal (9 plays, 60 yards, 4:20) | MRSH 20–9 |

| Statistics | Florida Atlantic | Marshall |
|---|---|---|
| First downs | 17 | 19 |
| Total yards | 234 | 385 |
| Rushing yards | 86 | 134 |
| Passing yards | 148 | 251 |
| Turnovers | 1 | 2 |
| Time of possession | 33:12 | 26:48 |

| Team | Category | Player | Statistics |
|---|---|---|---|
| Florida Atlantic | Passing | Nick Tronti | 18/30, 148 yards, 1 INT |
| Florida Atlantic | Rushing | Malcolm Davidson | 8 carries, 62 yards, 1 TD |
| Florida Atlantic | Receiving | Jordan Merrell | 5 receptions, 48 yards |
| Marshall | Passing | Grant Wells | 18/31, 251 yards, 2 TD, 2 INT |
| Marshall | Rushing | Brenden Knox | 25 carries, 101 yards |
| Marshall | Receiving | Corey Gammage | 6 receptions, 79 yards |

=== UTSA ===
Texas–San Antonio at Florida Atlantic

| Team | 1 | 2 | 3 | 4 | Total |
|---|---|---|---|---|---|
| Roadrunners | 0 | 3 | 0 | 0 | 3 |
| • Owls | 10 | 7 | 0 | 7 | 24 |

- Date: October 31, 2020
- Location: FAU Stadium
  Boca Raton, FL
- Game start: 12:00 p.m. EDT
- Elapsed time: 3 hours & 18 minutes
- Game attendance: 5,026
- Game weather: 82 °F (28 °C) • Weather: Humid/Partly Cloudy • Wind: ESE 6 MPH
- Referee: Chris Bynum
- TV announcers (Stadium): Chris Vosters (play-by-play) and Max Stark (analyst)

Scoring summary
| 1 | 10:53 | FAU | Vladimir Rivas 24 yard field goal (10 plays, 58 yards, 4:07) | FAU 3–0 |
| 1 | 04:55 | FAU | Aaron Young 27 yard pass from Nick Tronti (Vladimir Rivas kick) (10 plays, 80 yards, 4:00) | FAU 10–0 |
| 2 | 08:55 | UTSA | Hunter Duplessis 49 yard field goal (15 plays, 43 yards, 6:08) | FAU 10–3 |
| 2 | 01:58 | FAU | Nick Tronti 2 yard run (Vladimir Rivas kick) (9 plays, 80 yards, 3:46) | FAU 17–3 |
| 4 | 02:35 | FAU | James Charles 2 yard run (Vladimir Rivas kick) (5 plays, 19 yards, 1:03) | FAU 24–3 |

| Statistics | UTSA | Florida Atlantic |
|---|---|---|
| First downs | 16 | 19 |
| Total yards | 230 | 332 |
| Rushing yards | 104 | 196 |
| Passing yards | 126 | 136 |
| Turnovers | 0 | 0 |
| Time of possession | 27:54 | 32:06 |

| Team | Category | Player | Statistics |
|---|---|---|---|
| UTSA | Passing | Frank Harris | 12/26, 109 yards |
| UTSA | Rushing | Frank Harris | 14 carries, 66 yards |
| UTSA | Receiving | Joshua Cephus | 5 receptions, 63 yards |
| Florida Atlantic | Passing | Nick Tronti | 11/19, 136 yards, 1 TD |
| Florida Atlantic | Rushing | Malcolm Davidson | 14 carries, 115 yards |
| Florida Atlantic | Receiving | Aaron Young | 3 receptions, 54 yards, 1 TD |

=== Western Kentucky ===
Western Kentucky at Florida Atlantic

| Team | 1 | 2 | 3 | 4 | Total |
|---|---|---|---|---|---|
| Hilltoppers | 0 | 0 | 3 | 3 | 6 |
| • Owls | 0 | 0 | 3 | 7 | 10 |

- Date: November 7, 2020
- Location: FAU Stadium
  Boca Raton, FL
- Game start: 6:35 p.m. EST
- Elapsed time: 2 hours & 53 minutes
- Game attendance: 5,292
- Game weather: 72 °F (22 °C) • Weather: Rainy and Windy • Wind: E 20 MPH
- Referee: Jon Noli
- TV announcers (Stadium): Chris Hassel (play-by-play) and A. J. Hawk (analyst)

Scoring summary
| 3 | 08:51 | FAU | Vladimir Rivas 40 yard field goal (8 plays, 27 yards, 3:23) | FAU 3–0 |
| 3 | 02:57 | WKU | Brayden Narveson 32 yard field goal (13 plays, 61 yards, 5:54) | 3–3 |
| 4 | 08:09 | WKU | Brayden Narveson 49 yard field goal (4 plays, 6 yards, 1:31) | WKU 6–3 |
| 4 | 02:27 | FAU | Javion Posey 11 yard run (Vladimir Rivas kick) (12 plays, 75 yards, 5:42) | FAU 10–6 |

| Statistics | Western Kentucky | Florida Atlantic |
|---|---|---|
| First downs | 16 | 18 |
| Total yards | 257 | 273 |
| Rushing yards | 94 | 165 |
| Passing yards | 163 | 108 |
| Turnovers | 0 | 1 |
| Time of possession | 33:49 | 26:11 |

| Team | Category | Player | Statistics |
|---|---|---|---|
| Western Kentucky | Passing | Tyrrell Pigrome | 19/39, 163 yards |
| Western Kentucky | Rushing | Gaej Walker | 17 carries, 78 yards |
| Western Kentucky | Receiving | Xavier Lane | 7 receptions, 60 yards |
| Florida Atlantic | Passing | Nick Tronti | 7/16, 108 yards |
| Florida Atlantic | Rushing | Javion Posey | 9 carries, 60 yards, 1 TD |
| Florida Atlantic | Receiving | TJ Chase | 3 receptions, 47 yards |

=== At FIU ===
Florida Atlantic at Florida International

| Team | 1 | 2 | 3 | 4 | Total |
|---|---|---|---|---|---|
| • Owls | 7 | 17 | 0 | 14 | 38 |
| Panthers | 0 | 10 | 0 | 9 | 19 |

- Date: November 13, 2020
- Location: Riccardo Silva Stadium
  Miami, FL
- Game start: 7:00 p.m. EST
- Elapsed time: 3 hours & 26 minutes
- Game attendance: 0
- Game weather: 79 °F (26 °C) • Weather: Drizzle • Wind: ENE 7 MPH
- Referee: Chris Bynum
- TV announcers (CBS Sports Network): John Sadak (play-by-play) and Randy Cross (analyst)

Scoring summary
| 1 | 11:35 | FAU | LaJohntay Wester 11 yard pass from Javion Posey (Vladimir Rivas kick) (8 plays, 75 yards, 3:25) | FAU 7–0 |
| 2 | 13:17 | FAU | Vladimir Rivas 43 yard field goal (9 plays, 48 yards, 3:07) | FAU 10–0 |
| 2 | 13:01 | FIU | D'vonte Price 77 yard run (Chase Gabriel kick) (1 play, 77 yards, 0:16) | FAU 10–7 |
| 2 | 11:11 | FIU | Chase Gabriel 41 yard field goal (4 plays, 4 yards, 1:42) | 10–10 |
| 2 | 09:52 | FAU | Malcolm Davidson 37 yard run (Vladimir Rivas kick) (4 plays, 75 yards, 1:19) | FAU 17–10 |
| 2 | 01:41 | FAU | Brandon Robinson 5 yard pass from Javion Posey (Vladimir Rivas kick) (8 plays, 70 yards, 2:54) | FAU 24–10 |
| 4 | 14:09 | FIU | Chase Gabriel 21 yard field goal (15 plays, 79 yards, 6:26) | FAU 24–13 |
| 4 | 12:41 | FAU | James Charles 32 yard run (Vladimir Rivas kick) (4 plays, 68 yards, 1:28) | FAU 31–13 |
| 4 | 02:29 | FAU | Javion Posey 2 yard run (Vladimir Rivas kick) (12 plays, 78 yards, 6:02) | FAU 38–13 |
| 4 | 01:55 | FIU | Rivaldo Fairweather 67 yard pass from Max Bortenschlager (Two-point pass conversion FAILED) (3 plays, 67 yards, 0:34) | FAU 38–19 |

| Statistics | Florida Atlantic | FIU |
|---|---|---|
| First downs | 21 | 14 |
| Total yards | 450 | 281 |
| Rushing yards | 370 | 156 |
| Passing yards | 80 | 125 |
| Turnovers | 1 | 0 |
| Time of possession | 29:33 | 27:58 |

| Team | Category | Player | Statistics |
|---|---|---|---|
| Florida Atlantic | Passing | Javion Posey | 10/16, 80 yards, 2 TD |
| Florida Atlantic | Rushing | Javion Posey | 18 carries, 140 yards, 1 TD |
| Florida Atlantic | Receiving | TJ Chase | 1 reception, 28 yards |
| FIU | Passing | Max Bortenschlager | 10/18, 82 yards |
| FIU | Rushing | D'Vonte Price | 26 carries, 178 yards, 1 TD |
| FIU | Receiving | Rivaldo Fairweather | 6 receptions, 49 yards |

=== UMass ===
Massachusetts at Florida Atlantic

| Team | 1 | 2 | 3 | 4 | Total |
|---|---|---|---|---|---|
| Minutemen | 0 | 0 | 2 | 0 | 2 |
| • Owls | 7 | 0 | 14 | 3 | 24 |

- Date: November 20, 2020
- Location: FAU Stadium
  Boca Raton, FL
- Game start: 8:00 p.m. EST
- Elapsed time: 3 hours and 11 minutes
- Game attendance: 5,554
- Game weather: 77 °F (25 °C) • Weather: Mostly Cloudy • Wind: ENE 20 MPH
- Referee: K. Antee
- TV announcers (CBS Sports Network): Jason Knapp (play-by-play) and Malik Zaire (analyst)

Scoring summary
| 1 | 10:58 | FAU | BJ Emmons 1 yard run (Vladmir Rivas kick) (8 plays, 57 yards, 3:04) | FAU 7–0 |
| 3 | 06:47 | FAU | Brandon Robinson 13 yard pass from Nick Tronti (Vladmir Rivas kick) (15 plays, 65 yards, 8:13) | FAU 14–0 |
| 3 | 04:27 | FAU | Javion Posey 70 yard run (Vladmir Rivas kick) (1 play, 70 yards, 0:13) | FAU 21–0 |
| 3 | 01:55 | UMASS | 9 yard safety | FAU 21–2 |
| 4 | 04:58 | FAU | Vladmir Rivas 30 yard field goal (5 plays, 53 yards, 1:53) | FAU 24–2 |

| Statistics | UMass | Florida Atlantic |
|---|---|---|
| First downs | 8 | 16 |
| Total yards | 147 | 368 |
| Rushing yards | 62 | 140 |
| Passing yards | 85 | 228 |
| Turnovers | 2 | 1 |
| Time of possession | 25:10 | 34:50 |

| Team | Category | Player | Statistics |
|---|---|---|---|
| UMass | Passing | Will Koch | 12/22, 67 yards, 1 INT |
| UMass | Rushing | Ellis Merriweather | 11 carries, 48 yards |
| UMass | Receiving | Josiah Johnson | 8 receptions, 42 yards |
| Florida Atlantic | Passing | Javion Posey | 13/27, 203 yards |
| Florida Atlantic | Rushing | Javion Posey | 19 carries, 90 yards, 1 TD |
| Florida Atlantic | Receiving | TJ Chase | 4 receptions, 79 yards |

=== At Georgia Southern ===
Florida Atlantic at Georgia Southern

| Team | 1 | 2 | 3 | 4 | Total |
|---|---|---|---|---|---|
| Owls | 0 | 0 | 3 | 0 | 3 |
| • Eagles | 0 | 10 | 0 | 10 | 20 |

- Date: December 5, 2020
- Location: Paulson Stadium
  Statesboro, GA
- Game start: 6:00 p.m. EST
- Elapsed time: 2 hours & 55 minutes
- Game attendance: 3,867
- Game weather: • Weather: TBD • Wind: TBD MPH
- Referee: T. Livingston
- TV announcers (ESPN+): Matt Stewart (play-by-play) and Danny Waugh (analyst)

Scoring summary
| 2 | 13:29 | GASO | Khaleb Hood 49 yard punt return for TD (Alex Raynor kick) (1 play, 49 yards, 01:25) | GASO 7–0 |
| 2 | 03:30 | GASO | Alex Raynor 30 yard field goal (10 plays, 34 yards, 04:18) | GASO 10–0 |
| 3 | 02:26 | FAU | Vladimir Rivas 26 yard field goal (10 plays, 67 yards, 03:20) | GASO 10–3 |
| 4 | 12:39 | GASO | Logan Wright 2 yard TD run (Alex Raynor kick) (9 plays, 78 yards, 04:39) | GASO 17–3 |
| 4 | 04:51 | GASO | Alex Raynor 37 yard field goal (10 plays, 23 yards, 05:36) | Gaso 20–3 |

| Statistics | Florida Atlantic | Georgia Southern |
|---|---|---|
| First downs | 16 | 18 |
| Total yards | 322 | 339 |
| Rushing yards | 133 | 269 |
| Passing yards | 189 | 70 |
| Turnovers | 4 | 0 |
| Time of possession | 23:15 | 36:45 |

| Team | Category | Player | Statistics |
|---|---|---|---|
| Florida Atlantic | Passing | Javion Posey | 7/15, 105 yards, 2 INT |
| Florida Atlantic | Rushing | Javion Posey | 8 carries, 61 yards |
| Florida Atlantic | Receiving | Jordan Merrell | 3 receptions, 67 yards |
| Georgia Southern | Passing | Justin Tomlin | 3/12, 70 yards |
| Georgia Southern | Rushing | Justin Tomlin | 20 carries, 78 yards |
| Georgia Southern | Receiving | Logan Wright | 2 receptions, 65 yards |

=== At Southern Miss ===
Florida Atlantic at Southern Mississippi

| Team | 1 | 2 | 3 | 4 | Total |
|---|---|---|---|---|---|
| Owls | 7 | 10 | 14 | 0 | 31 |
| • Golden Eagles | 10 | 14 | 14 | 7 | 45 |

- Date: December 10, 2020
- Location: M. M. Roberts Stadium
  Hattiesburg, MS
- Game start: 6:30 p.m. EST
- Elapsed time: 2 hours & 40 minutes
- Game attendance: 0
- Game weather: 63 °F (17 °C) • Weather: Cloudy • Wind: SSW 2 MPH
- Referee: Ken Antee
- TV announcers (CBS Sports Network): Jason Knapp (play-by-play) and Corey Chavous (analyst)

Scoring summary
| 1 | 12:31 | FAU | Brandon Robinson 20 yd pass from Nick Tronti (Vladimir Rivas kick) (1 plays, 20 yards, 0:06) | FAU 7-0 |
| 1 | 09:09 | USM | Frank Gore Jr. 73 yard run (Briggs Bourgeois kick) (1 plays, 73 yards, 0:13) | 7-7 |
| 1 | 01:34 | USM | Briggs Bourgeois 38 yard field goal (12 plays, 60 yards, 5:17) | USM 10-7 |
| 2 | 11:18 | FAU | Vladimir Rivas 40 yard field goal (12 plays, 48 yards, 5:16) | 10-10 |
| 2 | 08:54 | USM | Trey Lowe 13 yard run (Briggs Bourgeois kick) (6 plays, 75 yards, 2:24) | USM 17-10 |
| 2 | 04:39 | FAU | James Charles 12 yard run (Vladimir Rivas kick) (7 plays, 77 yards, 4:15) | 17-17 |
| 2 | 00:08 | USM | Tim Jones 5 yard pass from Trey Lowe (Briggs Bourgeois kick) (13 plays, 75 yards, 4:31) | USM 24-17 |
| 3 | 11:08 | USM | Jason Brownlee 43 yard pass from Trey Lowe (Briggs Bourgeois kick) (6 plays, 80 yards, 3:52) | USM 31-17 |
| 3 | 03:53 | FAU | James Charles 1 yard run (Vladimir Rivas kick) (6 plays, 61 yards, TOP 2:28) | USM 31-24 |
| 3 | 03:39 | USM | Camron Harrell 100 yard kickoff return (Briggs Bourgeois kick) | USM 38-24 |
| 3 | 00:54 | FAU | Armani Adams 43 yard fumble recovery (Vladimir Rivas kick) | USM 38-31 |
| 4 | 04:55 | USM | Kevin Perkins 3 yard run (Briggs Bourgeois kick) (9 plays, 90 yards, 5:23) | USM 45-31 |

| Statistics | Florida Atlantic | Southern Miss |
|---|---|---|
| First downs | 19 | 22 |
| Total yards | 326 | 514 |
| Rushing yards | 164 | 305 |
| Passing yards | 162 | 209 |
| Turnovers | 1 | 3 |
| Time of possession | 28:41 | 31:19 |

| Team | Category | Player | Statistics |
|---|---|---|---|
| Florida Atlantic | Passing | Nick Tronti | 17/33, 162 yards, 1 TD, 1 INT |
| Florida Atlantic | Rushing | James Charles | 16 carries, 79 yards, 2 TD |
| Florida Atlantic | Receiving | Brandon Robinson | 5 receptions, 72 yards, 1 TD |
| Southern Miss | Passing | Trey Lowe | 13/19, 209 yards, 2 TD, 1 INT |
| Southern Miss | Rushing | Frank Gore Jr. | 9 carries, 111 yards, 1 TD |
| Southern Miss | Receiving | Jason Brownlee | 3 receptions, 81 yards, 1 TD |

=== Vs. Memphis (Montgomery Bowl) ===
Memphis vs. Florida Atlantic

| Team | 1 | 2 | 3 | 4 | Total |
|---|---|---|---|---|---|
| • Tigers | 10 | 8 | 7 | 0 | 25 |
| Owls | 0 | 0 | 10 | 0 | 10 |

- Date: December 23, 2020
- Location: Cramton Bowl
  Montgomery, AL
- Game start: 7:01 p.m. EST
- Elapsed time: 3 hours & 15 minutes
- Game attendance: 2,979
- Game weather: 61 °F (16 °C) • Weather: CLoudy; Some rain • Wind: NNW 7 MPH
- Referee: Marshall Lewis
- TV announcers (ESPN): Clay Matvick (play-by-play), Rocky Boiman (analyst), and Lauren Sisler (sideline reporter)

Scoring summary
| 1 | 07:15 | MEM | Riley Patterson 53-yard field goal (10 plays, 53 yards, 3:20) | MEM 3-0 |
| 1 | 02:26 | MEM | Javon Ivory 5-yard pass from Brady White (Riley Patterson kick) (8 plays, 52 yards, 3:18) | MEM 10-0 |
| 2 | 00:22 | MEM | Joseph Dorceus 2-yard pass from Brady White (John Hassell two-point conversion rush) (10 plays, 58 yards, 4:25) | MEM 18-0 |
| 3 | 09:53 | FAU | TJ Chase 3-yard pass from Nick Tronti (Vladimir Rivas kick) (9 plays, 73 yards, 3:14) | MEM 18-7 |
| 3 | 07:38 | FAU | Vladimir Rivas 27-yard field goal (7 plays, 16 yards, 2:15) | MEM 18-10 |
| 3 | 05:14 | MEM | Calvin Austin III 7-yard pass from Brady White (Riley Patterson kick) (7 plays, 75 yards, 2:24) | MEM 25-10 |

| Statistics | Memphis | Florida Atlantic |
|---|---|---|
| First downs | 24 | 19 |
| Total yards | 469 | 290 |
| Rushing yards | 185 | 139 |
| Passing yards | 284 | 151 |
| Turnovers | 3 | 2 |
| Time of possession | 30:44 | 29:16 |

| Team | Category | Player | Statistics |
|---|---|---|---|
| Memphis | Passing | Brady White | 22/34, 284 yards, 3 TDs, 1 INT |
| Memphis | Rushing | Asa Martin | 15 carries, 96 yards |
| Memphis | Receiving | Javon Ivory | 7 receptions, 126 yards, 1 TD |
| Florida Atlantic | Passing | Nick Tronti | 16/32, 146 yards, 1 TD, 1 INT |
| Florida Atlantic | Rushing | James Charles | 16 carries, 82 yards |
| Florida Atlantic | Receiving | Brandon Robinson | 4 receptions, 39 yards |
