= 2020 Western Kentucky Hilltoppers football team =

American college football season

2020 Western Kentucky Hilltoppers football

LendingTree Bowl, L 21–39 vs. Georgia State
- Conference: Conference USA
- East Division
- Record: 5–7 (4–3 C-USA)
- Head coach: Tyson Helton (2nd season)
- Offensive coordinator: Bryan Ellis (2nd season)
- Co-offensive coordinator: Ryan Aplin (1st season)
- Offensive scheme: Multiple
- Defensive coordinator: Clayton White (4th season)
- Co-defensive coordinator: Maurice Crum Jr. (1st season)
- Base defense: 4–2–5
- Home stadium: Houchens Industries–L. T. Smith Stadium

2020 Conference USA football standings
	Conf.			Overall
Team	W		L	W		L
East Division
Marshall xy	4	–	1	7	–	3
Florida Atlantic	4	–	2	5	–	4
Western Kentucky	4	–	3	5	–	7
Charlotte	2	–	2	2	–	4
Middle Tennessee	2	–	4	3	–	6
FIU	0	–	3	0	–	5
West Division
UAB xy$	3	–	1	6	–	3
UTSA	5	–	2	7	–	5
Louisiana Tech	4	–	2	5	–	5
North Texas	3	–	4	4	–	6
Rice	2	–	3	2	–	3
Southern Miss	2	–	4	3	–	7
UTEP	0	–	4	3	–	5
Championship: UAB 22, Marshall 13
$ – Conference champion; x – Division champion/co-champions; y – Championship game participant; Note: Due to COVID-19, Old Dominion opted out of the season.

The 2020 Western Kentucky Hilltoppers football team (WKU) represented Western Kentucky University in the 2020 NCAA Division I FBS football season. The Hilltoppers played their home games at the Houchens Industries–L. T. Smith Stadium in Bowling Green, Kentucky, as members of the East Division of Conference USA (C–USA). They were led by second-year head coach Tyson Helton.

== Schedule ==
Western Kentucky announced its 2020 football schedule on January 8, 2020. The 2020 schedule consists of 6 home and 5 away games in the regular season.

The Hilltoppers had games scheduled against Indiana and Old Dominion, which were canceled due to the COVID-19 pandemic.

Date	Time	Opponent	Site	TV	Result	Attendance
September 12	7:00 p.m.	at Louisville*	Cardinal Stadium; Louisville, KY	ACCN	L 21–35	11,179
September 19	11:00 a.m.	Liberty*	Houchens Industries–L. T. Smith Stadium; Bowling Green, KY	ESPNU	L 24–30	4,276
October 3	4:00 p.m.	at Middle Tennessee	Johnny "Red" Floyd Stadium; Murfreesboro, TN (100 Miles of Hate)	ESPN3	W 20–17	6,500
October 10	6:30 p.m.	Marshall	Houchens Industries–L. T. Smith Stadium; Bowling Green, KY	Stadium	L 14–38	4,428
October 17	12:30 p.m.	at UAB	Legion Field; Birmingham, AL	Stadium	L 14–37	11,098
October 24	3:00 p.m.	Chattanooga*	Houchens Industries–L. T. Smith Stadium; Bowling Green, KY	ESPN3	W 13–10	3,905
October 31	9:15 p.m.	at No. 11 BYU*	LaVell Edwards Stadium; Provo, UT	ESPN	L 10–41	6,843
November 7	5:00 p.m.	at Florida Atlantic	FAU Stadium; Boca Raton, FL	Stadium	L 6–10	5,292
November 14	2:30 p.m.	Southern Miss	Houchens Industries–L. T. Smith Stadium; Bowling Green, KY	CBSSN	W 10–7	3,815
November 21	1:00 p.m.	FIU	Houchens Industries–L. T. Smith Stadium; Bowling Green, KY	ESPN3	W 38–21	3,823
December 6	11:00 a.m.	at Charlotte	Jerry Richardson Stadium; Charlotte, NC	ESPN3	W 37–19	714
December 26	2:30 p.m.	vs. Georgia State*	Ladd–Peebles Stadium; Mobile, AL (2020 LendingTree Bowl)	ESPN	L 21–39	5,128
*Non-conference game; Rankings from AP Poll and CFP Rankings after November 24 released prior to game; All times are in Central time

Schedule source:

== Game summaries ==
=== At Louisville ===
Western Kentucky at Louisville

Team	1	2	3	4	Total
Hilltoppers	7	0	7	7	21
• Cardinals	7	21	7	0	35

- Date: September 12, 2020
- Location: Cardinal Stadium
  Louisville, KY
- Game start: 7:05 p.m. CDT
- Elapsed time: 3 hours and 3 minutes
- Game attendance: 11,179
- Game weather: 80 °F (27 °C) • Weather: Rainy • Wind: SSW 5 MPH
- Referee: J. Flanagan
- TV announcers (ACC Network): Roy Philpott (play–by–play), Tim Hasselbeck (analyst), Eric Wood (sideline reporter)

Scoring summary
1	12:53	WKU	Gaej Walker 1-yard rush (Brayden Narveson kick) (1 play, 1 yard, 0:05)	WKU 7–0
1	10:57	LOU	Ean Pfeifer 28-yard pass from Malik Cunningham (James Turner kick) (4 plays, 92 yards, 1:56)	TIE 7–7
2	14:54	LOU	Malik Cunningham 14-yard rush (James Turner kick) (10 plays, 93 yards, 4:14)	LOU 14–7
2	09:21	LOU	Javian Hawkins 19-yard rush (James Turner kick) (7 plays, 65 yards, 3:04)	LOU 21–7
2	00:42	LOU	Marshon Ford 2-yard pass from Malik Cunningham (James Turner kick) (13 plays, 87 yards, 5:52)	LOU 28–7
3	10:23	WKU	Malik Staples 1-yard rush (Brayden Narveson kick) (2 plays, 4 yards, 0:39)	LOU 28–14
3	08:58	LOU	Dez Fitzpatrick 70-yard pass from Malik Cunningham (James Turner kick) (3 plays, 85 yards, 1:25)	LOU 35–14
4	05:40	WKU	Mitchell Tinsley 12-yard pass from Tyyrell Pigrome (Brayden Narveson kick) (9 plays, 37 yards, 4:36)	LOU 35–28

Statistics	Western Kentucky	Louisville
First downs	12	22
Total yards	248	487
Rushing yards	119	144
Passing yards	129	343
Turnovers	1	2
Time of possession	27:27	32:33

Team	Category	Player	Statistics
Western Kentucky	Passing	Tyrrell Pigrome	10/23, 129 yards, 1 TD
Western Kentucky	Rushing	Tyrrell Pigrome	17 carries, 68 yards
Western Kentucky	Receiving	Jahcour Pearson	5 receptions, 67 yards
Louisville	Passing	Malik Cunningham	19/34, 343 yards, 3 TDs, 1 INT
Louisville	Rushing	Javian Hawkins	19 carries, 71 yards, 1 TD
Louisville	Receiving	Dez Fitzpatrick	4 receptions, 110 yards, 1 TD

=== Liberty ===
Liberty at Western Kentucky

Team	1	2	3	4	Total
• Flames	10	7	7	6	30
Hilltoppers	0	10	7	7	24

- Date: September 19, 2020
- Location: Houchens Industries–L. T. Smith Stadium
  Bowling Green, KY
- Game start: 12:02 p.m. EDT
- Elapsed time: 3 hours and 14 minutes
- Game attendance: 4,276
- Game weather: 64 °F (18 °C) • Weather: Sunny • Wind: NE 9 MPH
- Referee: Joe Lehring
- TV announcers (ESPNU): Clay Matvick (play–by–play) and Rocky Boiman (analyst)

Scoring summary
1	11:27	LIB	Malik Willis 4-yard rush (Alex Barbir kick) (5 plays, 52 yards, 2:02)	LIB 7–0
1	05:21	LIB	Alex Barbir 24-yard field goal (14 plays, 70 yards, 4:36)	LIB 10–0
2	14:56	WKU	Brayden Narveson 43-yard field goal (11 plays, 47 yards, 5:25)	LIB 10–3
2	10:15	LIB	Malik Willis 4-yard rush (Alex Barbir kick) (11 plays, 65 yards, 4:41)	LIB 17–3
2	06:15	WKU	Mitchell Tinsley 6-yard pass from Tyrrell Pigrome (Brayden Narveson kick) (8 plays, 88 yards, 4:00)	LIB 17–10
3	10:56	LIB	Dalvin Smith 24-yard pass from Tyrrell Pigrome (Brayden Narveson kick) (7 plays, 79 yards, 3:00)	TIE 17–17
3	01:33	LIB	Shedro Louis 29-yard rush (Alex Barbir kick) (4 plays, 85 yards, 1:43)	LIB 24–17
4	11:43	LIB	Malik Willis 18-yard rush (Alex Barbir PAT failed) (6 plays, 57 yards, 3:17)	LIB 30–17
4	03:04	WKU	Craig Burt Jr. 24-yard pass from Tyrrell Pigrome (Brayden Narveson kick) (9 plays, 87 yards, 3:41)	LIB 30–24

Statistics	Liberty	Western Kentucky
First downs	27	19
Total yards	487	291
Rushing yards	354	110
Passing yards	133	181
Turnovers	0	0
Time of possession	34:59	25:01

Team	Category	Player	Statistics
Liberty	Passing	Malik Willis	13/21, 133 yards
Liberty	Rushing	Malik Willis	21 carries, 168 yards, 3 TDs
Liberty	Receiving	CJ Yarbrough	2 receptions, 53 yards
Western Kentucky	Passing	Tyrrell Pigrome	18/25, 181 yards, 3 TDs
Western Kentucky	Rushing	Tyrrell Pigrome	14 carries, 74 yards
Western Kentucky	Receiving	Mitchell Tinsley	6 receptions, 69 yards, 1 TD

=== At Middle Tennessee ===
Middle Tennessee at Western Kentucky

Team	1	2	3	4	Total
• Hilltoppers	0	10	3	7	20
Blue Raiders	0	10	0	7	17

- Date: October 3, 2020
- Location: Johnny "Red" Floyd Stadium
  Murfreesboro, TN
- Game start: 4:05 p.m. CDT
- Elapsed time: 3 hours and 3 minutes
- Game attendance: 6,500
- Game weather: 69 °F (21 °C) • Weather: Sunny & Nice • Wind: ESE 1 MPH
- Referee: Rodney Burnette
- TV announcers (ESPN3): Jake Rose (play–by–play) and Jeremy Kellem (analyst)

Scoring summary
2	14:09	WKU	Brayden Narveson 47-yard field goal (11 play, 30 yard, 5:02)	WKU 3–0
2	07:51	MTSU	Asher O'Hara 1-yard rush (Crews Holt kick) (14 plays, 75 yards, 6:18)	MTSU 7–3
2	02:59	MTSU	Crews Holt 44-yard field goal (8 plays, 42 yards, 2:03)	MTSU 10–3
2	00:21	WKU	Xavier Lane 6-yard pass from Tyrrell Pigrome (Brayden Narveson kick) (13 plays, 75 yards, 2:38)	TIE 10–10
3	03:26	WKU	Brayden Narveson 53-yard field goal (14 plays, 64 yards, 4:30)	WKU 13–10
4	06:04	WKU	Joshua Simon 11-yard pass from Tyrrell Pigrome (Brayden Narveson kick) (13 plays, 68 yards, 6:39)	WKU 20–10
4	02:07	MTSU	CJ Windham 2-yard pass from Asher O'Hara (Crews Holt kick) (12 plays, 75 yards, 3:57)	WKU 20–17

Statistics	Western Kentucky	Middle Tennessee
First downs	21	18
Total yards	326	319
Rushing yards	138	102
Passing yards	188	217
Turnovers	1	0
Time of possession	31:35	28:25

Team	Category	Player	Statistics
Western Kentucky	Passing	Tyrrell Pigrome	21/36, 188 yards, 2 TDs
Western Kentucky	Rushing	Tyrrell Pigrome	16 carries, 55 yards
Western Kentucky	Receiving	Xavier Lane	7 receptions, 73 yards, 1 TD
Middle Tennessee	Passing	Asher O'Hara	23/33, 217 yards, 1 TD
Middle Tennessee	Rushing	Asher O'Hara	25 carries, 98 yards, 1 TD
Middle Tennessee	Receiving	Jarrin Pierce	9 receptions, 65 yards

=== Marshall ===
Marshall at Western Kentucky

Team	1	2	3	4	Total
• Thundering Herd	14	14	10	10	48
Hilltoppers	0	0	7	7	14

- Date: October 10, 2020
- Location: Houchens Industries–L. T. Smith Stadium
  Bowling Green, KY
- Game start: 6:36 p.m. CDT
- Elapsed time: 2 hours and 57 minutes
- Game attendance: 4,428
- Game weather: 68 °F (20 °C) • Weather: Partly Cloudy • Wind: E 6 MPH
- Referee: Billy Williams
- TV announcers (FOX Sports): Chris Hassel (play–by–play) and A. J. Hawk (analyst)

Scoring summary
1	14:22	MARSH	Brenden Knox 45-yard rush (Shane Ciucci kick) (2 plays, 75 yards, 0:38)	MARSH 7–0
1	02:21	MARSH	Sheldon Evans 5-yard rush (Shane Ciucci kick) (9 plays, 60 yards, 4:30)	MARSH 14–0
2	02:14	MARSH	Brenden Knox 1-yard rush (Shane Ciucci kick) (4 plays, 45 yards, 1:49)	MARSH 21–0
2	00:27	MARSH	Brenden Knox 9-yard rush (Shane Ciucci kick) (7 plays, 37 yards, 1:33)	MARSH 28–0
3	09:20	MARSH	Tavante Beckett 38-yard fumble returned (Shane Ciucci kick) (4 plays, 13 yards, 1:42)	MARSH 35–0
3	02:22	MARSH	Shane Ciucci 28-yard field goal (11 plays, 34 yards, 5:20)	MARSH 38–0
3	00:00	WKU	Kevaris Thomas 2-yard rush (Brayden Narveson kick) (5 plays, 75 yards, 0:00)	MARSH 38–7
4	00:06	WKU	Dalvin Smith 26-yard pass from Kevaris Thomas (Brayden Narveson kick) (11 plays, 80 yards, 1:37)	MARSH 38–14

Statistics	Marshall	Western Kentucky
First downs	17	15
Total yards	343	294
Rushing yards	181	85
Passing yards	162	209
Turnovers	0	3
Time of possession	34:41	25:19

Team	Category	Player	Statistics
Marshall	Passing	Grant Wells	16/22, 162 yards
Marshall	Rushing	Brenden Knox	15 carries, 107 yards, 3 TDs
Marshall	Receiving	Broc Thompson	4 receptions, 94 yards
Western Kentucky	Passing	Kevaris Thomas	9/18, 148 yards, 1 TD
Western Kentucky	Rushing	Kevaris Thomas	7 carries, 30 yards, 1 TD
Western Kentucky	Receiving	Xavier Lane	4 receptions, 74 yards

=== At UAB ===
Western Kentucky at Alabama–Birmingham

Team	1	2	3	4	Total
Hilltoppers	7	7	0	0	14
• RV Blazers	10	14	10	3	37

- Date: October 17, 2020
- Location: Legion Field
  Birmingham, AL
- Game start: 12:36 p.m. CDT
- Elapsed time: 3 hours and 55 minutes
- Game attendance: 11,098
- Game weather: 65 °F (18 °C) • Weather: Sunny • Wind: E 3 MPH
- Referee: Joe Lehring
- TV announcers (FOX Sports): Chris Hassel (play–by–play) and A. J. Hawk (analyst)

Scoring summary
1	10:17	UAB	Matthew Quinn 38-yard field goal (8 plays, 41 yards, 3:00)	UAB 3–0
1	04:56	WKU	Mitchell Tinsley 6-yard pass from Kevaris Thomas (Brayden Narveson kick) (8 plays, 85 yards, 3:12)	WKU 7–3
1	00:42	UAB	Spencer Brown 2-yard rush (Matthew Quinn kick) (2 plays, 9 yards, 1:08)	UAB 10–7
2	12:43	UAB	DeWayne McBride 71-yard rush (Matthew Quinn kick) (3 plays, 80 yards, 1:17)	UAB 17–7
2	05:36	WKU	Joshua Simon 6-yard pass from Kevaris Thoams (Brayden Narveson kick) (12 plays, 75 yards, 7:07)	UAB 17–14
2	00:52	UAB	Austin Watkins 2-yard pass from Bryson Lucero (Matthew Quinn kick) (6 plays, 24 yards, 1:07)	UAB 24–14
3	13:06	UAB	Ryan Davis 37-yard blocked punt returned (Matthew Quinn kick) (3 plays, 5 yards, 0:52)	UAB 31–14
3	07:08	UAB	Matthew Quinn 44-yard field goal (11 plays, 55 yards, 4:46)	UAB 34–14
09:39	UAB	Matthew Quinn 30-yard field goal (7 plays, 21 yards, 3:42)	UAB 37–14

Statistics	Western Kentucky	UAB
First downs	15	17
Total yards	250	358
Rushing yards	88	217
Passing yards	162	141
Turnovers	4	2
Time of possession	28:33	31:27

Team	Category	Player	Statistics
Western Kentucky	Passing	Kevaris Thomas	16/35, 162 yards, 2 TDs, 2 INTs
Western Kentucky	Rushing	Jakairi Moses	6 carries, 41 yards
Western Kentucky	Receiving	Joshua Simon	6 receptions, 81 yards, 1 TD
UAB	Passing	Bryson Lucero	15/31, 141 yards, 1 TD, 1 INT
UAB	Rushing	DeWayne McBride	10 carries, 131 yards, 1 TD
UAB	Receiving	Austin Watkins	7 receptions, 55 yards, 1 TD

=== Chattanooga ===
Chattanooga at Western Kentucky

Team	1	2	3	4	Total
Mocs	7	0	3	0	10
• Hilltoppers	3	0	3	7	13

- Date: October 24, 2020
- Location: Houchens Industries–L. T. Smith Stadium
  Bowling Green, KY
- Game start: 3:05 p.m. CDT
- Elapsed time: 2 hours and 51 minutes
- Game attendance: 3,905
- Game weather: 50 °F (10 °C) • Weather: Cloudy • Wind: NE 10 MPH
- Referee: Chris Bynum
- TV announcers (ESPN3): Graham Doty (play–by–play) and Brandon Doughty (analyst)

Scoring summary
1	07:44	UTC	Drayton Arnold 10-yard rush (Victor Ulmo kick) (14 plays, 75 yards, 7:16)	UTC 7–0
1	04:06	WKU	Brayden Narveson 32-yard field goal (7 plays, 50 yards, 3:18)	UTC 7–3
3	09:35	UTC	Victor Ulmno 22-yard field goal (4 plays, 4 yards, 1:19)	UTC 10–3
3	04:57	WKU	Brayden Narveson 32-yard field goal (9 plays, 43 yards, 4:38)	UTC 10–6
4	01:21	WKU	Craig Burt Jr. 4-yard pass from Tyrrell Pigrome (Brayden Narveson kick) (10 plays, 54 yards, 4:08)	WKU 13–10

Statistics	Chattanooga	Western Kentucky
First downs	13	14
Total yards	225	254
Rushing yards	135	122
Passing yards	90	132
Turnovers	0	2
Time of possession	32:21	27:39

Team	Category	Player	Statistics
Chattanooga	Passing	Drayton Arnold	9/23, 90 yards
Chattanooga	Rushing	Ailym Ford	25 carries, 92 yards
Chattanooga	Receiving	Tyron Arnett	2 receptions, 30 yards
Western Kentucky	Passing	Tyrrell Pigrome	4/8, 73 yards, 1 TD
Western Kentucky	Rushing	Gaej Walker	17 carries, 88 yards
Western Kentucky	Receiving	Mitchell Tinsley	4 receptions, 46 yards

=== At BYU ===
Western Kentucky at Brigham Young

Team	1	2	3	4	Total
Hilltoppers	3	0	7	0	10
• No. 11 Cougars	14	21	3	3	41

- Date: October 31, 2020
- Location: LaVell Edwards Stadium
  Provo, UT
- Game start: 8:20 p.m. CDT
- Elapsed time: 9:20 p.m.
- Game attendance: 6,843
- Game weather: 49 °F (9 °C) • Weather: Sunny • Wind: NW 0 MPH
- Referee: Kevin Hassell
- TV announcers (ESPN): Beth Mowins (play–by–play), Kirk Morrison (analyst), and Stormy Buonantony (sideline reporter)

Scoring summary
1	10:38	BYU	Tyler Allgeier 2-yard rush (Jake Oldroyd kick) (10 plays, 75 yards, 4:22)	BYU 7–0
1	02:24	WKU	Brayden Narveson 44-yard field goal (14 plays, 49 yards, 8:14)	BYU 7–3
1	00:22	BYU	Dax Milne 23-yard pass from Zach Wilson (Jake Oldroyd kick) (6 plays, 75 yards, 2:02)	BYU 14–3
2	12:45	BYU	Zach Wilson 5-yard rush (Jake Oldroyd kick) (8 plays, 39 yards, 2:27)	BYU 21–3
2	07:44	BYU	Lopini Katoa 42-yard pass from Zach Wilson (Jake Oldroyd kick) (5 plays, 84 yards, 2:11)	BYU 28–3
2	00:16	BYU	Isaac Rex 4-yard pass from Zach Wilson (Jake Oldroyd kick) (15 plays, 88 yards, 4:20)	BYU 35–3
3	03:09	WKU	Joshua Simon 3-yard pass from Tyrrell Pigrome (Brayden Narveson kick) (1 play, 3 yards, 0:04)	BYU 35–10
3	00:00	BYU	Jake Oldroyd 49-yard field goal (9 plays, 43 yards, 3:09)	BYU 38–10
4	00:58	BYU	Jake Oldroyd 45-yard field goal (11 plays, 42 yards, 5:01)	BYU 41–10

Statistics	Western Kentucky	BYU
First downs	12	22
Total yards	248	487
Rushing yards	119	144
Passing yards	129	343
Turnovers	1	2
Time of possession	27:27	32:33

Team	Category	Player	Statistics
Western Kentucky	Passing	Tyrrell Pigrome	19/30, 106 yards, 1 TD
Western Kentucky	Rushing	Gaej Walker	17 carries, 75 yards
Western Kentucky	Receiving	Xavier Lane	3 receptions, 31 yards
BYU	Passing	Zach Wilson	18/22, 224 yards, 3 TDs, 1 INT
BYU	Rushing	Tyler Allgeier	16 carries, 95 yards, 1 TD
BYU	Receiving	Dax Milne	5 receptions, 67 yards, 1 TD

=== At Florida Atlantic ===
Western Kentucky at Florida Atlantic

Team	1	2	3	4	Total
Hilltoppers	0	0	3	3	6
• Owls	0	0	3	7	10

- Date: November 7, 2020
- Location: FAU Stadium
  Boca Raton, FL
- Game start: 5:35 p.m. CST
- Elapsed time: 2 hours and 53 minutes
- Game attendance: 5,292
- Game weather: 72 °F (22 °C) • Weather: Rainy and Windy • Wind: E 20 MPH
- Referee: Jon Noli
- TV announcers (FOX Sports): Chris Hassel (play–by–play) and A. J. Hawk (analyst)

Scoring summary
3	08:51	FAU	Vladimir Rivas 40-yard field goal (8 plays, 27 yards, 3:23)	FAU 3–0
3	02:57	WKU	Brayden Narveson 32-yard field goal (13 plays, 61 yards, 5:54)	TIE 3–3
4	08:09	WKU	Brayden Narveson 49-yard field goal (4 plays, 6 yards, 1:31)	WKU 6–3
4	02:27	FAU	Javion Posey 11-yard rush (Vladimir Rivas kick) (12 plays, 75 yards, 5:42)	FAU 10–6

Statistics	Western Kentucky	Florida Atlantic
First downs	16	18
Total yards	257	273
Rushing yards	94	165
Passing yards	163	108
Turnovers	0	1
Time of possession	33:49	26:11

Team	Category	Player	Statistics
Western Kentucky	Passing	Tyrrell Pigrome	19/39, 163 yards
Western Kentucky	Rushing	Gaej Walker	17 carries, 78 yards
Western Kentucky	Receiving	Xavier Lane	7 receptions, 60 yards
Florida Atlantic	Passing	Nick Tronti	7/16, 108 yards
Florida Atlantic	Rushing	Javion Posey	9 carries, 60 yards, 1 TD
Florida Atlantic	Receiving	TJ Chase	3 receptions, 47 yards

=== Southern Miss ===
Southern Miss at Western Kentucky

Team	1	2	3	4	Total
Golden Eagles	0	0	0	7	7
• Hilltoppers	7	3	0	0	10

- Date: November 14, 2020
- Location: Houchens Industries–L. T. Smith Stadium
  Bowling Green, KY
- Game start: 2:37 p.m. CDT
- Elapsed time: 3 hours and 3 minutes
- Game attendance: 3,815
- Game weather: 61 °F (16 °C) • Weather: Mostly Cloudy • Wind: SE 3 MPH
- Referee: Ken Antee
- TV announcers (CBS Sports Network): Dave Ryan (play–by–play) and Corey Chavous (analyst)

Scoring summary
1	09:07	WKU	Tyrrell Pigrome 5-yard rush (Brayden Narveson kick) (9 plays, 91 yards, 4:20)	WKU 7–0
2	12:54	WKU	Brayden Narveson 24-yard field goal (18 plays, 65 yards, 9:10)	WKU 10–0
4	10:30	USM	Kevin Perkins 6-yard rush (Briggs Bourgeois kick) (12 plays, 90 yards, 6:14)	WKU 10–7

Statistics	Southern Miss	Western Kentucky
First downs	13	19
Total yards	221	304
Rushing yards	154	121
Passing yards	67	183
Turnovers	0	0
Time of possession	25:18	34:42

Team	Category	Player	Statistics
Southern Miss	Passing	Trey Lowe	6/14, 67 yards
Southern Miss	Rushing	Kevin Perkins	8 carries, 71 yards, 1 TD
Southern Miss	Receiving	Antoine Robinson	2 receptions, 25 yards
Western Kentucky	Passing	Tyrrell Pigrome	19/30, 183 yards
Western Kentucky	Rushing	Jakairi Moses	12 carries, 40 yards
Western Kentucky	Receiving	Xavier Lane	5 receptions, 90 yards

=== FIU ===
Florida International at Western Kentucky

Team	1	2	3	4	Total
Panthers	7	6	0	8	21
• Hilltoppers	0	10	14	14	38

- Date: November 21, 2020
- Location: Houchens Industries–L. T. Smith Stadium
  Bowling Green, KY
- Game start: 1:05 p.m. CST
- Elapsed time: 3 hours and 14 minutes
- Game attendance: 3,823
- Game weather: 66 °F (19 °C) • Weather: Mostly Cloudy • Wind: S 5 MPH
- Referee: Joe Lehring
- TV announcers (ESPN3): Nate Gatter (play–by–play) and Brandon Doughty (analyst)

Scoring summary
1	08:40	FIU	JJ Holloman 28-yard pass from Max Bortenschlager (Chase Gabriel kick) (9 plays, 52 yards, 3:36)	FIU 7–0
2	10:33	WKU	Brayden Narveson 39-yard field goal (9 plays, 55 yards, 3:41)	FIU 7–3
2	10:19	FIU	EJ Wilson Jr. 100-yard kickoff returned (Chase Gabriel PAT failed) (0 plays, 0 yards, 0:00)	FIU 13–3
2	00:43	WKU	Tyrrell Pigrome 1-yard rush (Brayden Narveson kick) (8 plays, 65 yards, 3:11)	FIU 13–10
3	09:25	WKU	Roger Cray 19-yard fumble returned (Brayden Narveson kick) (6 plays, 18 yards, 2:34)	WKU 17–13
3	09:08	WKU	Eli Brown 22-yard interception returned (Brayden Narveson kick) (1 play, 0 yards, 0:08)	WKU 24–13
4	13:54	WKU	Gaej Walker 1-yard rush (Brayden Narveson kick) (3 plays, 59 yards, 0:56)	WKU 31–13
4	09:23	WKU	Tyrrell Pigrome 4-yard rush (Brayden Narveson kick) (4 plays, 44 yards, 1:27)	WKU 38–13
4	00:18	FIU	Kaylan Wiggins 1-yard rush (Kaylan Wiggins two-point conversion rush) (21 plays, 75 yards, 9:05)	WKU 38–21

Statistics	FIU	Western Kentucky
First downs	17	13
Total yards	268	278
Rushing yards	121	157
Passing yards	147	121
Turnovers	2	0
Time of possession	33:51	26:09

Team	Category	Player	Statistics
FIU	Passing	Max Bortenschlager	8/18, 106 yards, 1 TD, 1 INT
FIU	Rushing	D'Vonte Price	24 carries, 100 yards
FIU	Receiving	JJ Holloman	2 receptions, 54 yards, 1 TD
Western Kentucky	Passing	Tyrrell Pigrome	14/25, 121 yards
Western Kentucky	Rushing	Gaej Walker	17 carries, 127 yards, 1 TD
Western Kentucky	Receiving	Mitchell Tinsley	3 receptions, 28 yards

=== At Charlotte ===
Western Kentucky at Charlotte

Team	1	2	3	4	Total
• Hilltoppers	3	14	10	10	37
49ers	0	0	7	12	19

- Date: December 6, 2020
- Location: Jerry Richardson Stadium
  Charlotte, NC
- Game start: 11:05 a.m. CST
- Elapsed time: 3 hours and 13 minutes
- Game attendance: 714
- Game weather: 49 °F (9 °C) • Weather: Sunny and Clear • Wind: 0 MPH
- Referee: Jonathan Noli
- TV announcers (ESPN3): Bobby Rosinski (play–by–play) and Reggie Walker (analyst)

Scoring summary
1	02:47	WKU	Brayden Narveson 33-yard field goal (8 plays, 64 yards, 4:07)	WKU 3–0
2	14:44	WKU	A. J. Brathwaite Jr. 2-yard fumble returned (Brayden Narveson kick) (7 plays, -23 yards, 3:03)	WKU 10–0
2	00:19	WKU	Jordan Meredith 0-yard fumble returned (Brayden Narveson kick) (10 plays, 65 yards, 2:39)	WKU 17–0
3	09:30	CHAR	Micaleous Elder 5-yard pass from Chris Reynolds (Jonathan Cruz kick) (10 plays, 75 yards, 5:30)	WKU 17–7
3	07:18	WKU	Brayden Narveson 46-yard field goal (7 plays, 47 yards, 2:12)	WKU 20–7
3	03:16	WKU	Mitchell Tinsley 3-yard pass from Tyrrell Pigrome (Brayden Narveson kick) (5 plays, 59 yards, 2:10)	WKU 27–7
4	14:44	WKU	Brayden Narveson 49-yard field goal (6 plays, 26 yards, 1:44)	WKU 30–7
4	05:01	CHAR	Cameron Dollar 30-yard pass from Chris Reynolds (Chris Reynolds two-point pass conversion attempt failed) (7 plays, 68 yards, 1:35)	WKU 30–13
4	02:22	WKU	C. J. Jones 5-yard rush (Brayden Narveson kick) (6 plays, 51 yards, 2:39)	WKU 37–13
4	00:31	CHAR	Micaleous Elder 14-yard pass from Dom Shoffner (Dom Shoffner two-point pass conversion attempt failed) (5 plays, 68 yards, 1:51)	WKU 37–19

Statistics	Western Kentucky	Charlotte
First downs	21	18
Total yards	436	308
Rushing yards	218	89
Passing yards	218	219
Turnovers	0	1
Time of possession	29:59	30:01

Team	Category	Player	Statistics
Western Kentucky	Passing	Tyrrell Pigrome	18/27, 218 yards, 1 TD
Western Kentucky	Rushing	Gaej Walker	19 carries, 98 yards
Western Kentucky	Receiving	Dakota Thomas	5 receptions, 78 yards
Charlotte	Passing	Chris Reynolds	14/34, 205 yards, 2 TDs
Charlotte	Rushing	Tre Harbison	16 carries, 80 yards
Charlotte	Receiving	Victor Tucker	8 receptions, 111 yards

=== Vs. Georgia State (LendingTree Bowl) ===
Georgia State vs. Western Kentucky

Team	1	2	3	4	Total
• Panthers	7	20	3	9	39
Hilltoppers	7	0	7	7	21

- Date: December 26, 2020
- Location: Ladd–Peebles Stadium
  Mobile, AL
- Game start: 2:30 p.m. CST
- Elapsed time: 3 hours and 26 minutes
- Game attendance: 5,128
- Game weather: 52 °F (11 °C) • Weather: Sunny • Wind: SE 4 MPH
- Referee: Mike Cuttone
- TV announcers (ESPN): Mike Couzens (play–by–play), Jay Walker (analyst), Dawn Davenport (sideline reporter)

Scoring summary
1	04:02	WKU	Tyrrell Pigrome 2-yard rush (Brayden Narveson kick) (14 plays, 80 yards, 5:39)	WKU 7–0
1	00:08	GSU	Destin Coates 11-yard rush (Noel Ruiz kick) (11 plays, 75 yards, 4:07)	TIE 7–7
2	09:50	GSU	Sam Pinckney 26-yard pass from Cornelious Brown IV (Noel Ruiz kick) (11 plays, 82 yards, 4:07)	GSU 14–7
2	02:09	GSU	Jamari Thrash 5-yard pass from Cornelious Brown IV (Noel Ruiz kick) (13 plays, 77 yards, 5:49)	GSU 21–7
2	00:08	GSU	Cornelius McCoy 8-yard pass from Cornelious Brown IV (Noel Ruiz PAT blocked) (12 plays, 80 yards, 1:44)	GSU 27–7
3	11:27	WKU	Gaej Walker 2-yard rush (Brayden Narveson kick) (8 plays, 64 yards, 3:35)	GSU 27–14
3	07:59	GSU	Noel Ruiz 45-yard field goal (4 plays, 4 yards, 1:14)	GSU 30–14
4	11:19	GSU	Noel Ruiz 29-yard field goal (14 plays, 85 yards, 6:52)	GSU 33–14
4	05:13	GSU	Cadarrius Thompson 25-yard pass from Mikele Colasurdo (two-point conversion rush attempt failed) (2 plays, 27 yards, 0:41)	GSU 39–14
4	02:18	WKU	C. J. Jones 2-yard rush (Brayden Narveson kick) (7 plays, 60 yards, 2:56)	GSU 39–21

Statistics	Georgia State	Western Kentucky
First downs	27	14
Total yards	484	284
Rushing yards	227	104
Passing yards	257	180
Turnovers	1	3
Time of possession	35:02	24:58

Team	Category	Player	Statistics
Georgia State	Passing	Cornelious Brown IV	16/30, 232 yards, 3 TDs, 1 INT
Georgia State	Rushing	Destin Coates	23 carries, 117 yards, 1 TD
Georgia State	Receiving	Cornelius McCoy	5 receptions, 88 yards, 1 TD
Western Kentucky	Passing	Tyrrell Pigrome	17/33, 180 yards, 2 INTs
Western Kentucky	Rushing	C. J. Jones	5 carries, 57 yards, 1 TD
Western Kentucky	Receiving	Joshua Simon	4 receptions, 84 yards
