= Jonathan Bullard =

American football player (born 1993)

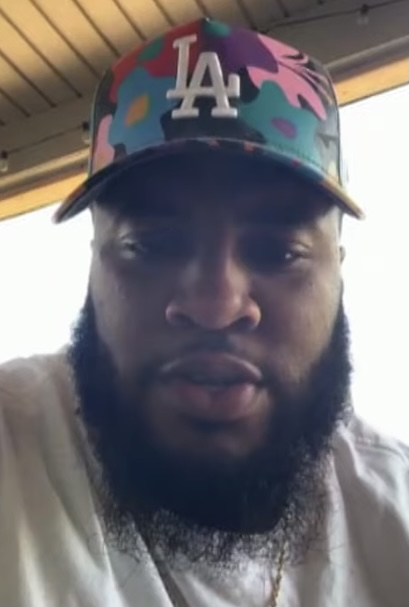
- Bullard in 2021

No. 90 – Dallas Cowboys
- Position: Defensive end
- Roster status: Active

Personal information
- Born: October 22, 1993 (age 33); Shelby, North Carolina, U.S.
- Listed height: 6 ft 3 in (1.91 m)
- Listed weight: 290 lb (132 kg)

Career information
- High school: Crest (Shelby)
- College: Florida (2012–2015)
- NFL draft: 2016: 3rd round, 72nd overall pick

Career history
- Chicago Bears (2016–2018); Arizona Cardinals (2019–2020); Seattle Seahawks (2020); Atlanta Falcons (2021); Minnesota Vikings (2022–2024); New Orleans Saints (2025); Dallas Cowboys (2026–present)

Awards and highlights
- Third-team All-American (2015); First-team All-SEC (2015); First-team Freshman All-SEC (2012)

Career NFL statistics as of Week 10, 2026
- Total tackles: 251
- Sacks: 8.0
- Forced fumbles: 2
- Pass deflections: 10
- Stats at Pro Football Reference

Jonathan Bullard (born October 22, 1993) is an American professional football defensive end for the Dallas Cowboys of the National Football League (NFL). He played college football for the Florida Gators and was selected by the Chicago Bears in the third round of the 2016 NFL draft, and has also played for the Arizona Cardinals, Seattle Seahawks, Minnesota Vikings, and New Orleans Saints.

== Early life ==
Bullard attended Crest Senior High School in Shelby, North Carolina. As a senior, he had 82 tackles and 16 sacks. Bullard was a five-star recruit and was ranked as the best defensive end in his class. He committed to the University of Florida to play college football.

== College career ==
Bullard played in all 13 games and made two starts as a true freshman at Florida in 2012. He had 27 tackles and 1.5 sacks. As a sophomore in 2013, he played in 11 games with eight starts and recorded 33 tackles and 1.5 sacks. He started all 12 games and had 52 tackles with 2.5 sacks his junior year in 2014. Bullard returned to Florida his senior season rather than enter the 2015 NFL draft.

== Professional career ==
Pre-draft measurables
Height	Weight	Arm length	Hand span	Wingspan	40-yard dash	10-yard split	20-yard split	20-yard shuttle	Three-cone drill	Vertical jump	Broad jump	Bench press
6 ft 3 in (1.91 m)	285 lb (129 kg)	33 5/8 in (0.85 m)	10 in (0.25 m)	6 ft 9 1/4 in (2.06 m)	4.93 s	1.66 s	2.82 s	4.56 s	7.31 s	32.0 in (0.81 m)	9 ft 8 in (2.95 m)	23 reps
All values from NFL Combine

=== Chicago Bears ===
Bullard was selected in the third round (72nd overall) by the Chicago Bears in the 2016 NFL draft. He signed his rookie contract on June 6, 2016. He made his NFL debut on September 11 against the Houston Texans. On October 9, Bullard recorded his first sack of his career, taking down Indianapolis Colts' Andrew Luck. He finished his rookie season with one start in fourteen games, recording eighteen tackles and a sack.

Bullard recorded his first career pass break-up on September 28, 2017, as well as a tackle against the Green Bay Packers. On October 29, he logged his first forced fumble against the New Orleans Saints, stripping running back Mark Ingram II In a blowout loss to the Philadelphia Eagles, Bullard got his first and only sack of the 2017 season, bringing down quarterback Carson Wentz on November 26. He finished his second season with three starts, recording 26 tackles, a sack, and two pass breakups. Bullard was waived during the final roster cuts on August 31, 2019.

=== Arizona Cardinals ===
On September 1, 2019, Bullard was claimed off waivers by the Arizona Cardinals. He was placed on injured reserve on December 6, 2019, with a hamstring injury. He finished the season with 22 tackles and 1.5 sacks through nine games and six starts.

On April 3, 2020, Bullard re-signed with the Cardinals. On September 5, Bullard was released during final roster cuts. He was re-signed to the practice squad a day later.

=== Seattle Seahawks ===
On October 7, 2020, Bullard was signed to the active roster of the Seattle Seahawks off the Cardinals' practice squad. He was placed on the reserve/COVID-19 list by the Seahawks on January 9, 2021, and activated on January 21.

=== Atlanta Falcons ===
On April 1, 2021, Bullard signed a one-year contract with the Atlanta Falcons.

=== Minnesota Vikings ===
On June 2, 2022, Bullard signed with the Minnesota Vikings. He was placed on injured reserve on December 10, 2022. He was activated on January 7, 2023.

Bullard re-signed with the Vikings on March 21, 2023. He played in all 17 games with 14 starts, recording a career-high 44 tackles and two sacks.

On March 13, 2024, Bullard re-signed with the Vikings. He started all 17 games, recording 41 tackles, one sack, and three passes defensed.

=== New Orleans Saints ===
On July 23, 2025, Bullard signed a one-year contract with the New Orleans Saints. Bullard made 15 appearances (including six starts) for the Saints, recording two pass deflections and 26 combined tackles.

=== Dallas Cowboys ===
On March 28, 2026, Bullard signed a one-year, $2.5 million contract with the Dallas Cowboys. On September 30, 2026, Bullard was placed on injured reserve. He was activated on November 14.
