= Romeo McKnight =

American football player (born 1998)

Profile
- Position: Defensive end

Personal information
- Born: March 25, 1998 (age 28); Crystal Lake, Illinois, U.S.
- Listed height: 6 ft 4 in (1.93 m)
- Listed weight: 261 lb (118 kg)

Career information
- High school: Crystal Lake (Crystal Lake, Illinois)
- College: Charlotte
- NFL draft: 2021: undrafted

Career history
- Cleveland Browns (2021)*; Calgary Stampeders (2022); Edmonton Elks (2024)
- * Offseason or practice squad member only
- Stats at Pro Football Reference
- Stats at CFL.ca

Romeo McKnight (born March 25, 1998) is an American professional football defensive end. He played college football at Charlotte and was signed as an undrafted free agent by the Cleveland Browns after the 2021 NFL draft. He was also been a member of the Calgary Stampeders and Edmonton Elks of the CFL.

== College career ==
McKnight was ranked as a three–star recruit by 247Sports.com coming out of high school. He committed to Iowa on June 29, 2015. After two seasons at Iowa, McKnight decided to transfer from Iowa on May 13, 2018. He committed to Illinois State shortly thereafter. McKnight played two years at Illinois State before transferring to Charlotte on December 8, 2019.

== Professional career ==
=== Cleveland Browns ===
McKnight was signed as an undrafted free agent by the Cleveland Browns on May 3, 2021, where he joined college teammate Tre Harbison. He was waived on August 25, 2021.

=== Calgary Stampeders ===
On May 31, 2022, McKnight signed with the Calgary Stampeders of the Canadian Football League (CFL). He began the season on the practice squad, but made his professional debut on August 5, 2022, against the Ottawa Redblacks. He played in four regular season games where he had seven defensive tackles and one sack. However, following the 2023 preseason, he was released on June 3, 2023.

=== Edmonton Elks ===
McKnight signed with the Edmonton Elks of the Canadian Football League on December 15, 2023.
