= Crest High School (North Carolina) =

Public secondary school in Shelby, North Carolina (USA)

Location
- Shelby, North Carolina 28152; United States
- 35°16′21″N 81°36′35″W

Information
- Type: Public
- Opened: 1967 (59 years ago)
- School district: Cleveland County Schools
- Superintendent: Stephen Fisher
- CEEB code: 340390
- NCES School ID: 370090000340
- Principal: Jeremy Shields
- Teaching staff: 64.23 (FTE)
- Grades: 9–12
- Enrollment: 1,101 (2023-2024)
- Student to teacher ratio: 17.14
- Campus type: Rural
- Colors: Green and gold
- Athletics conference: Big South Conference
- Team name: Chargers
- Rivals: Shelby High School, Burns High School, Kings Mountain High School
- Yearbook: The Crestonian
- Feeder schools: Crest Middle School
- Website: https://chs.clevelandcountyschools.org/

Crest High School is a public high school in Shelby, North Carolina. It is part of the Cleveland County Schools district.

== Overview ==
Crest High School has 1,262 students from grades 9–12. As of the 2011–12 school year, there are 87.57 teachers (FTE basis) and the student/faculty ratio is 14.41. Its campus is fringe rural. The Crest Chargers currently compete in the Big South Conference and are classified as 5A/6A in the North Carolina High School Athletic Association (NCHSAA).

== History ==
The school was approved in 1965, after Cleveland County residents voted 3,420 to 1,615 to authorize US$3,250,000 in construction bonds for two new high schools. Crest High School would open in the fall of 1967. In 1986–87, Crest High School was a Blue Ribbon School. The word "CREST" was originally an acronym for "Cleveland Rural Education Stands Together".

== Notable alumni ==
- Jonathan Bullard – NFL defensive end
- Charlie Harbison – American football coach
- Tre Harbison – NFL running back
- Manteo Mitchell – American track and field sprint athlete, won silver medal at the 2012 Summer Olympics
- Kevin "PPMD" Nanney – professional Super Smash Bros. Melee player
- Dawson Odums – college football head coach
- Travis Padgett – American track and field sprint athlete, competed at the 2008 Summer Olympics
- Ron Rash – American poet, short story writer, and novelist
- Brandon Spikes – NFL linebacker, 2-time BCS national champion with Florida
- David Thompson – NBA player, 4-time NBA All-Star and NCAA champion with NC State Wolfpack
