= Brayden Narveson =

American football player (born 1999)

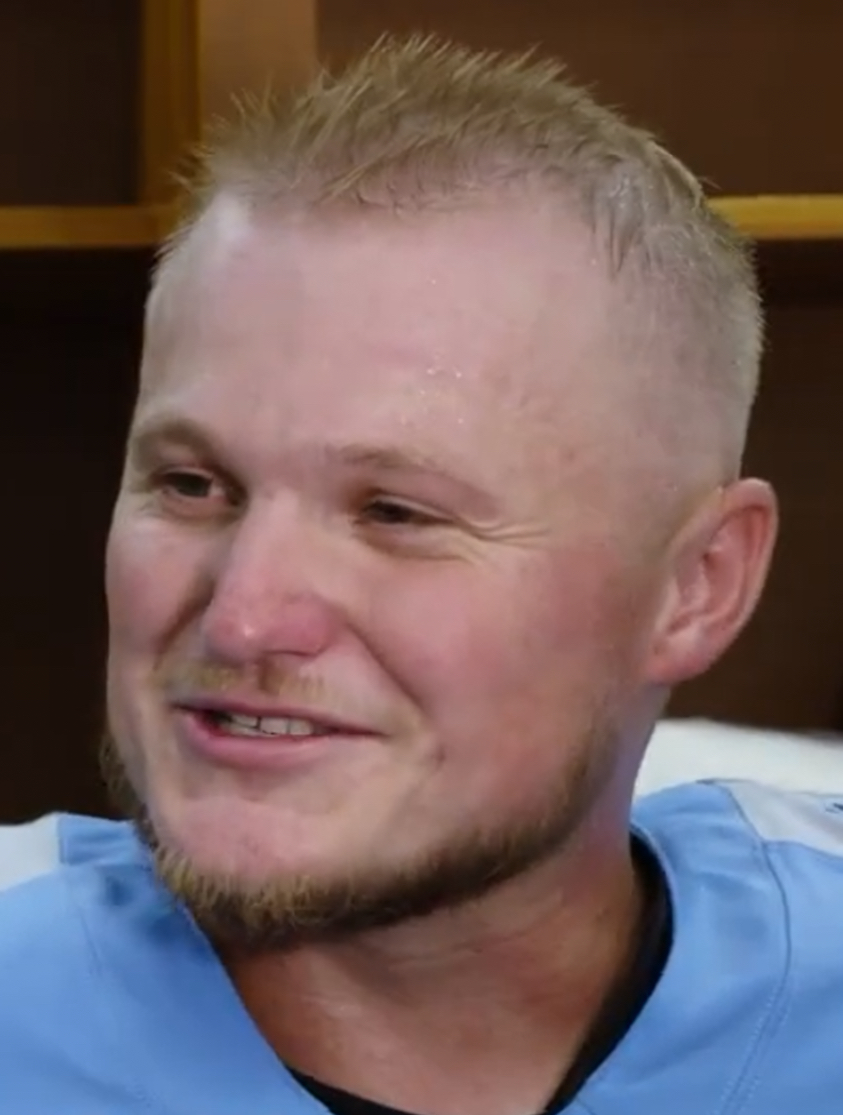
- Narveson with the Tennessee Titans in 2024

Profile
- Position: Placekicker

Personal information
- Born: September 28, 1999 (age 27); Scottsdale, Arizona, U.S.
- Listed height: 6 ft 0 in (1.83 m)
- Listed weight: 215 lb (98 kg)

Career information
- High school: Desert Mountain (Scottsdale, Arizona)
- College: Iowa State (2018–2019); Western Kentucky (2020–2022); NC State (2023)
- NFL draft: 2024: undrafted

Career history
- Tennessee Titans (2024)*; Green Bay Packers (2024); Tennessee Titans (2024); Edmonton Elks (2025)*
- * Offseason or practice squad member only

Awards and highlights
- 2× Second-team All-Conference USA (2020, 2021)

Career NFL statistics
- Field goals made: 12
- Field goals attempted: 18
- Field goal %: 66.7
- Longest field goal: 47
- Extra points made: 18
- Extra points attempted: 18
- Extra point %: 100
- Stats at Pro Football Reference

Brayden Narveson (Note: Pronounced /brædən nɑːrvɪsən/ BRAY-dən NAR-və-suhn) (born September 28, 1999) is an American professional football placekicker. He played college football for the Iowa State Cyclones, Western Kentucky Hilltoppers, and the NC State Wolfpack. He signed with the Tennessee Titans as an undrafted free agent in 2024, before being picked up and released by the Green Bay Packers.

== Early life ==
Narveson was born in Scottsdale, Arizona. Narveson attended Desert Mountain High School, where he played American football, as a placekicker.

== College career ==
Narveson attended Iowa State in 2018 and 2019, Western Kentucky from 2020 to 2022, and NC State in 2023. In 2018, for his freshman season, Narveson did not see the field, and then only attempted 4 field goals the next year during his redshirt freshman season. Narveson continued kicking for three more seasons during his undergraduate work, and one additional season in graduate school. He finished his career making 71 of his 91 field goal attempts (78%), and went 196 of 196 on extra point attempts (100%) which combined for 409 points.

== Professional career ==
Pre-draft measurables
Height	Weight	Arm length	Hand span
5 ft 11 1/8 in (1.81 m)	209 lb (95 kg)	29 1/8 in (0.74 m)	9 3/8 in (0.24 m)
All values from Pro Day

=== Tennessee Titans (first stint) ===
Narveson went undrafted in the 2024 NFL draft and was signed by the Tennessee Titans on May 10, 2024. In his first 3 preseason games, Narveson made 7 of 8 field goal attempts (87.5%), the only miss being short from 58, which was nearly returned for a kick return touchdown by Samson Nacua. Narveson also made three field goals in the fourth quarter against the Seattle Seahawks, 21 yards, 59 yards, and a game winning 46-yard field goal in the preseason. He was released after losing the kicking job to Nick Folk on August 27, 2024.

=== Green Bay Packers ===
Narveson was claimed off waivers by the Green Bay Packers on August 28, 2024. Narveson was named the starting kicker after Greg Joseph was released a few hours after Narveson was signed. In his NFL debut, he made both extra points and three of four field goal attempts (31, 23, 26) but missed from 43 off of the right upright in the 34–29 loss to the Philadelphia Eagles in Week 1. In Week 4, against the Minnesota Vikings, Narveson missed both field goal attempts (37, 49) which contributed to their 31–29 loss. The next week, he rebounded by making all of his extra point attempts as well as his only field goal attempt as the Packers beat the Los Angeles Rams 24-19. In Week 6, his last game with the Packers, Narveson converted 2 of 3 field goal attempts and all four extra point attempts.

On October 16, 2024, after missing 5 of his 17 field goal attempts, the Packers released Narveson in favor of Brandon McManus.

=== Tennessee Titans (second stint) ===
On December 10, 2024, Narveson returned to the Titans via a practice squad agreement. He was promoted to the active roster on December 21, and subsequently had his contract extended through the 2025 season. In his first game with the Titans, Narveson missed his only field goal attempt and made both of his extra point attempts. On December 23, the Titans again released Narveson.

=== Edmonton Elks ===
The Edmonton Elks of the Canadian Football League (CFL) announced the signing of Narveson on May 28, 2025, replacing Campbell Fair. Three days later, on May 31, Narveson was released.

== Career statistics ==
=== NFL ===
Legend
**Bold**	Career high

General			Field goals					PATs			Kickoffs			Points
Season	Team	GP	FGM	FGA	FG%	Blck	Long	XPM	XPA	XP%	KO	Avg	TBs	Pts
2024	GB	6	**12**	**17**	**70.6**	**0**	**47**	**16**	**16**	**100**	**33**	64.2	**17**	**52**
2024	TEN	1	0	1	0.0	**0**	0	2	2	**100**	5	**65**	1	2
Career		7	12	18	66.7	0	47	18	18	100	38	64.3	18	54
Source: pro-football-reference.com

=== College ===
Legend
**Bold**	Career high

General			Field goals					PATs			Kickoffs			Points
Season	Team	GP	FGM	FGA	FG%	Blck	Long	XPM	XPA	XP%	KO	Avg	TBs	Pts
2019	Iowa State	5	2	4	50.0%	0	48	0	0	0.0%	0	0	0	6
2020	Western Kentucky	12	13	14	**92.9%**	0	53	27	27	**100%**	0	0	0	66
2021	Western Kentucky	14	**23**	**29**	79.3%	0	53	**72**	**72**	**100%**	0	0	0	**141**
2022	Western Kentucky	13	15	21	71.4%	0	51	59	59	**100%**	0	0	0	104
2023	NC State	13	18	23	78.3%	0	**57**	38	38	**100%**	0	0	0	92
Career		57	71	91	78%	0	57	196	196	100%	0	0	0	409
