= Tre Harbison =

American football player (born 1998)

Profile
- Position: Running back

Personal information
- Born: July 1, 1998 (age 28); Shelby, North Carolina, U.S.
- Listed height: 5 ft 11 in (1.80 m)
- Listed weight: 215 lb (98 kg)

Career information
- High school: Crest (Shelby, North Carolina)
- College: Virginia (2016); Northern Illinois (2016–2019); Charlotte (2020)
- NFL draft: 2021: undrafted

Career history
- Cleveland Browns (2021)

Awards and highlights
- Second-team All-MAC (2018)
- Stats at Pro Football Reference

Tre Harbison III (born July 1, 1998) is an American former football running back. He played college football at Charlotte and was signed as an undrafted free agent by the Cleveland Browns after the 2021 NFL draft.

== College career ==
Harbison was ranked as a three–star recruit by 247Sports.com coming out of high school. He committed to Virginia on April 12, 2015. After only one semester at Virginia, Harbison surprisingly decided to transfer from Virginia. He committed to Northern Illinois shortly thereafter. Harbison played three years at Northern Illinois before entering the transfer portal again on November 26, 2019. He committed to Charlotte on December 8, 2019.

== Professional career ==
Harbison was signed as an undrafted free agent by the Cleveland Browns on May 3, 2021, where he reunited with college teammate Romeo McKnight. He was waived/injured on August 6, and placed on injured reserve with a neck injury. Harbison announced his retirement from professional football on August 31. He was officially released by the Browns on May 13, 2022.

== Personal life ==
His uncle Charlie Harbison, half-brother Devin Baldwin, and father James each played football at Gardner–Webb University.
