= 2020 North Carolina Tar Heels football team =

American college football season

2020 North Carolina Tar Heels football

Orange Bowl, L 27–41 vs. Texas A&M
- Conference: Atlantic Coast Conference

Ranking
- Coaches: No. 17
- AP: No. 18
- Record: 8–4 (7–3 ACC)
- Head coach: Mack Brown (12th season)
- Offensive coordinator: Phil Longo (2nd season)
- Offensive scheme: Air raid
- Co-defensive coordinators: Jay Bateman (2nd season); Tommy Thigpen (2nd season)
- Base defense: 4–2–5
- Home stadium: Kenan Stadium

2020 Atlantic Coast Conference football standings
	Conf.			Overall
Team	W		L	W		L
No. 5 Notre Dame y^	9	–	0	10	–	2
No. 3 Clemson y$^	8	–	1	10	–	2
No. 22 Miami (FL)	7	–	2	8	–	3
No. 18 North Carolina	7	–	3	8	–	4
NC State	7	–	3	8	–	4
Boston College	5	–	5	6	–	5
Pittsburgh	5	–	5	6	–	5
Virginia Tech	5	–	5	5	–	6
Virginia	4	–	5	5	–	5
Wake Forest	3	–	4	4	–	5
Georgia Tech	3	–	6	3	–	7
Louisville	3	–	7	4	–	7
Florida State	2	–	6	3	–	6
Duke	1	–	9	2	–	9
Syracuse	1	–	9	1	–	10
Championship: Clemson 34, Notre Dame 10
^ – College Football Playoff participant; $ – Conference champion; y – Championship game participant; Rankings from AP Poll.

The 2020 North Carolina Tar Heels football team represented the University of North Carolina at Chapel Hill as a member of the Atlantic Coast Conference (ACC) during the 2020 NCAA Division I FBS football season. The Tar Heels were led by head coach Mack Brown, in the second season of his second stint at North Carolina and his 12th overall season. The team played their home games at Kenan Stadium.

Building on the momentum from the first season of Brown's return to Chapel Hill, the Tar Heels finished in a three-way tie for third place in the ACC. Divisional play had been suspended due to the COVID-19 pandemic. With Clemson and Notre Dame selected for the College Football Playoff, the Tar Heels received a bid to the Orange Bowl, their first appearance in a major bowl since 1949.

== Personnel ==
=== Coaching staff ===
North Carolina Tar Heels coaches
Mack Brown	Head coach	2nd
Phil Longo	Offensive coordinator/quarterbacks coach	2nd
John Lilly	Tight end coach	1st
Stacy Searels	Offensive line coach	2nd
Lonnie Galloway	Wide receivers coach	2nd
Robert Gillespie	Running back coach	2nd
Jay Bateman	Defensive coordinator/Safeties coach	2nd
Tommy Thigpen	Associate Defensive coordinator/Inside linebackers coach	3rd
Tim Cross	Defensive line coach	2nd
Jovan Dewitt	Special teams coordinator/Outside linebackers coach	1st
Dre Bly	Cornerbacks coach	2nd
Brian Hess	Strength and conditioning	2nd
Sparky Woods	Senior advisor to head coach	2nd
Darrell Moody	Senior advisor to head coach	2nd
Ken Browning	Senior advisor to head coach	2nd

=== Roster ===
2020 North Carolina Tar Heels Football Roster
Quarterback: 6 Jacolby Criswell – freshman (6'1, 225); 7 Sam Howell – sophomore (6'1, 225); 10 Jace Ruder – (redshirt) sophomore (6'3, 225); 14 Jefferson Boaz – freshman (6'7, 245); Running back: 8 Michael Carter – senior (5'9, 200); 21 Elijah Green – freshman (5'11, 200); 23 Josh Henderson – sophomore (6'0, 210); 25 Javonte Williams – junior (5'10, 220); 26 D.J. Jones – freshman (5'10, 190); 34 British Brooks – junior (5'11, 205); Wide receiver: 0 Emery Simmons – sophomore (6'0, 190); 1 Khafre Brown – (redshirt) freshman (6'0, 180); 2 Dyami Brown – junior (6'1, 190); 3 Antoine Green – junior (6'2, 210); 4 Rontavious Groves – (redshirt) junior (5'11, 185); 5 Dazz Newsome – senior (5'11, 190); 9 Ray Rose – freshman (6'1, 210); 11 Josh Downs – freshman (5'10, 180); 12 Stephen Gosnell – freshman (6'2, 185); 13 Tylee Craft – freshman (6'4, 180); 15 Beau Corrales – senior (6'4, 210); 83 Justin Olson – (redshirt) freshman (6'2, 190); Placekicker: 17 Grayson Atkins – (redshirt) Graduate (5'9, 185); 95 Jonathan Kim – (redshirt) sophomore (6'0, 205); 97 Noah Ruggles – (redshirt) junior (6'2, 185); Punter: 91 Ben Kiernan – sophomore (6'0, 205)	Tight end: 81 Jon Copenhaver – freshman (6'3, 220); 82 Kendall Karr – freshman (6'3, 230); 84 Garrett Walston – (redshirt) senior (6'4, 245); 88 Kamari Morales – (redshirt) freshman (6'2, 250); Offensive lineman: 51 Wyatt Tunall – (redshirt) freshman (6'6, 295); 52 Jonathan Adorno – freshman (6'4, 300); 55 Ty Murray – (redshirt) freshman (6'3, 325); 57 Cayden Baker – freshman (6'5, 285); 63 Ed Montilus – (redshirt) sophomore (6'3, 310); 64 Malik McGowan – freshman (6'3, 320); 66 Tobechi Nwokeji – (redshirt) junior (6'4, 305); 67 Trey Zimmerman – freshman (6'5, 290); 68 Brian Anderson – (redshirt) junior (6'2, 300); 69 Quiron Johnson – (redshirt) junior (6'1, 315); 71 Tristan Miller – (redshirt) freshman (6'4, 290); 72 Asim Richards – sophomore (6'4, 300); 73 Marcus McKethan – (redshirt) junior (6'7, 330); 74 Jordan Tucker – (redshirt) junior (6'7, 335); 75 Joshua Ezeudu – (redshirt) sophomore (6'4, 325); 76 William Barnes – (redshirt) sophomore (6'4, 325); 77 Wisdom Asaboro – (redshirt) freshman (6'8, 310); 79 Hunter Shope – (redshirt) freshman (6'2, 290); Defensive lineman: 41 Kedrick Bingley-Jones – freshman (6'4, 280); 51 Raymond Vohasek – junior (6'3, 295); 52 Jahlil Taylor – (redshirt) sophomore (6'0, 315); 54 A.J. Beatty – freshman (6'4, 275); 55 Clyde Pinder – freshman (6'0, 305); 56 Tomari Fox – sophomore (6'2, 280); 58 Lancine Turay – (redshirt) sophomore (6'5, 280); 88 Myles Murphy – freshman (6'4, 285); 90 Xach Gill – (redshirt) junior (6'4, 290); 93 Kristian Varner – (redshirt) freshman (6'5, 295); 98 Kevin Hester – (redshirt) Freshman (6'4, 275)	Linebacker: 7 Eugene Asante – sophomore (6'1, 215); 8 Khadry Jackson – sophomore (6'1, 225); 10 Desmond Evans – freshman (6'5, 245); 12 Tomon Fox – (redshirt) senior (6'3, 260); 17 Chris Collins – (redshirt) sophomore (6'4, 240); 21 Chazz Surratt – (redshirt) senior (6'2, 230); 24 Ethan West – freshman (6'3, 230); 25 Kaimon Rucker – freshman (6'1, 250); 33 Cedric Gray – freshman (6'1, 215); 42 Tyrone Hopper – (redshirt) Graduate (6'4, 250); 44 Jeremiah Gemmel – (redshirt) junior (6'1, 228); 49 Parks Cochrane – (redshirt) freshman (5'11, 230); Defensive back: 0 Ja'Qurious Conley – freshman (6'1, 215); 1 Kyler McMichael – (redshirt) sophomore (6'0, 200); 2 Don Chapman – sophomore (6'0, 185); 3 Cameron Roseman-Sinclair – freshman (5'11, 195); 4 Trey Morrison – junior (5'9, 190); 5 Patrice Rene – (redshirt) senior (6'2, 205); 9 Cam'Ron Kelly – sophomore (6'1, 205); 13 Obi Egbuna – sophomore (5'10, 180); 14 Welton Spottsville – sophomore (5'11, 210); 15 Ladaeson DeAndre Hollins – (redshirt) sophomore (6'1, 210); 16 D.J. Ford – (redshirt) senior (6'3, 210); 20 Tony Grimes – freshman (6'0, 180); 23 Javon Terry – (redshirt) sophomore (6'1, 200); 27 Giovanni Biggers – sophomore (6'1, 185); 29 Storm Duck – sophomore (6'1, 200); Long snappers: 60 Trevor Collins – (redshirt) senior (6'1, 235); 61 Drew Little – sophomore (5'11, 225)
: 2020 North Carolina Tar Heels Football Roster 11/16/20

== Schedule ==
North Carolina had games scheduled against Auburn, James Madison, UConn and UCF, which were all canceled due to the COVID-19 pandemic. On September 17, Charlotte announced the game at North Carolina scheduled for September 19 was canceled due to the impact that contact tracing quarantine had on a key position group. Several members of the Charlotte offensive line were placed into quarantine following the University's COVID-19 contact tracing protocols, effectively depleting that unit. On November 16, it was announced that the games with Miami and Western Carolina would be swapped due to COVID-19 issues with the Hurricanes. The Tar Heels will play the Catamounts on December 5 and Miami a week later on December 12.

The ACC released their schedule on July 29, with specific dates selected at a later date.

Date	Time	Opponent	Rank	Site	TV	Result	Attendance
September 12	12:00 p.m.	Syracuse	No. 18	Kenan Stadium; Chapel Hill, NC	ACCN	W 31–6	0
October 3	3:30 p.m.	at Boston College	No. 12	Alumni Stadium; Chestnut Hill, MA	ABC	W 26–22	0
October 10	12:00 p.m.	No. 19 Virginia Tech	No. 8	Kenan Stadium; Chapel Hill, NC	ABC	W 56–45	3,535
October 17	7:30 p.m.	at Florida State	No. 5	Doak Campbell Stadium; Tallahassee, FL	ABC	L 28–31	18,016
October 24	12:00 p.m.	No. 23 NC State	No. 14	Kenan Stadium; Chapel Hill, NC (rivalry)	ESPN	W 48–21	3,535
October 31	8:00 p.m.	at Virginia	No. 15	Scott Stadium; Charlottesville, VA (South's Oldest Rivalry)	ACCN	L 41–44	1,000
November 7	12:00 p.m.	at Duke		Wallace Wade Stadium; Durham, NC (Victory Bell)	ESPN2	W 56–24	0
November 14	12:00 p.m.	Wake Forest		Kenan Stadium; Chapel Hill, NC (rivalry)	ACCN	W 59–53	3,535
November 27	3:30 p.m.	No. 2 Notre Dame	No. 19	Kenan Stadium; Chapel Hill, NC	ABC	L 17–31	3,535
December 5	12:00 p.m.	Western Carolina*	No. 17	Kenan Stadium; Chapel Hill, NC	ACCN	W 49–9	3,535
December 12	3:30 p.m.	at No. 10 Miami (FL)	No. 17	Hard Rock Stadium; Miami Gardens, FL	ABC	W 62–26	12,092
January 2	8:00 p.m.	vs. No. 5 Texas A&M*	No. 13	Hard Rock Stadium; Miami Gardens, FL (Orange Bowl)	ESPN	L 27–41	13,737
*Non-conference game; Rankings from AP Poll and CFP Rankings after November 24 released prior to game; All times are in Eastern time

== Rankings ==
Ranking movements Legend: ██ Increase in ranking ██ Decrease in ranking RV = Received votes т = Tied with team above or below
	Week																	
Poll	Pre	1	2	3	4	5	6	7	8	9	10	11	12	13	14	15	16	Final
AP	18	18*	12	11	12	8	5	14T	15	RV	RV	RV	25	RV	20	16	14	18
Coaches	19	19*	11	12	11	9	6	13	13	24	RV	24	23	RV	20	15	14	17
CFP	Not released												19	17	17	15	13	Not released

== Game summaries ==
=== Syracuse ===
Syracuse at North Carolina

Team	1	2	3	4	Total
Orange	0	3	3	0	6
• No. 18 Tar Heels	7	0	3	21	31

- Date: September 12, 2020
- Location: Kenan Stadium
  Chapel Hill, NC
- Game start: 12:03 p.m. EDT
- Elapsed time: 3 hours and 9 minutes
- Game attendance: 0
- Game weather: Temperature: 75 °F (24 °C) • Weather: Partly Cloudy • Wind: ENE 7 MPH
- Referee: Duane Heydt
- TV announcers (ACCN): Wes Durham (play–by–play), Roddy Jones (analyst), and Taylor Davis (sideline reporter)

Scoring summary
1	10:49	NC	Garrett Walston 11-yard pass from Sam Howell (Grayson Atkins kick) (10 plays, 65 yards, 4:11)	NC 7–0
2	10:43	SU	Andre Szmyt 37-yard field goal (6 plays, 2 yards, 2:20)	NC 7–3
3	08:11	SU	Andre Szmyt 24-yard field goal (10 plays, 42 yards, 4:39)	NC 7–6
3	03:18	NC	Grayson Atkins 31-yard field goal (12 plays, 65 yards, 4:53)	NC 10–6
4	14:57	NC	Javonte Williams 1-yard run (Grayson Atkins kick) (6 plays, 77 yards, 2:27)	NC 17–6
4	11:33	NC	Javonte Williams 6-yard run (Grayson Atkins kick) (4 plays, 68 yards, 1:56)	NC 24–6
4	09:37	NC	Javonte Williams 6-yard run (Grayson Atkins kick) (2 plays, 44 yards, 0:39)	NC 31–6

Statistics	Syracuse	North Carolina
First downs	15	23
Total yards	202	463
Rushing yards	68	160
Passing yards	134	303
Turnovers	1	3
Time of possession	27:50	32:10

Team	Category	Player	Statistics
Syracuse	Passing	Tommy DeVito	13/31, 112 yards
Syracuse	Rushing	Tommy DeVito	16 carries, 30 yards
Syracuse	Receiving	Taj Harris	5 receptions, 64 yards
North Carolina	Passing	Sam Howell	25/34, 295 yards, 1 TD, 2 INTs
North Carolina	Rushing	Michael Carter	7 carries, 78 yards
North Carolina	Receiving	Dyami Brown	6 receptions, 94 yards

=== At Boston College ===
North Carolina at Boston College

Team	1	2	3	4	Total
• No. 12 Tar Heels	14	7	3	2	26
Eagles	3	13	0	6	22

- Date: October 3, 2020
- Location: Alumni Stadium
  Chestnut Hill, MA
- Game start: 3:36 p.m. EDT
- Elapsed time: 3 hours and 33 minutes
- Game attendance: 0
- Game weather: Temperature: 61 °F (16 °C) • Weather: Mostly Sunny • Wind: SW 9 MPH
- Referee: Mike Roche
- TV announcers (ABC): Joe Tessitore (play–by–play), Greg McElroy (analyst), and Paul Carcaterra (sideline reporter)

Scoring summary
1	07:35	NC	Khafre Brown 24-yard pass from Sam Howell (Grayson Atkins kick) (12 plays, 83 yards, 4:13)	NC 7–0
1	03:46	BC	Aaron Boumerhi 35-yard field goal (10 plays, 57 yards, 3:49)	NC 7–3
1	01:21	NC	Javonte Williams 1-yard run (Grayson Atkins kick) (6 plays, 58 yards, 2:24)	NC 14–3
2	12:34	BC	Aaron Boumerhi 27-yard field goal (10 plays, 65 yards, 3:47)	NC 14–6
2	11:35	BC	David Bailey 5-yard pass from Phil Jurkovec (Aaron Boumerhi kick) (3 plays, 5 yards, 0:18)	NC 14–13
2	01:09	NC	Javonte Williams 41-yard pass from Sam Howell (Grayson Atkins kick) (11 plays, 81 yards, 5:39)	NC 21–13
2	00:00	BC	Aaron Boumerhi 30-yard field goal (10 plays, 62 yards, 1:09)	NC 21–16
3	06:25	NC	Grayson Atkins 35-yard field goal (8 plays, 60 yards, 2:32)	NC 24–16
4	00:45	BC	C.J. Lewis 6-yard pass from Phil Jurkovec (pass intercepted) (15 plays, 69 yards, 5:01)	NC 24–22
4	00:45	NC	Trey Morrison 98-yard PAT return (15 plays, 69 yards, 5:01)	NC 26–22

Statistics	North Carolina	Boston College
First downs	24	22
Total yards	401	353
Rushing yards	176	40
Passing yards	225	313
Turnovers	1	0
Time of possession	28:57	31:03

Team	Category	Player	Statistics
North Carolina	Passing	Sam Howell	14/26, 225 yards, 2 TDs, 1 INT
North Carolina	Rushing	Michael Carter	16 carries, 121 yards
North Carolina	Receiving	Dyami Brown	4 receptions, 60 yards
Boston College	Passing	Phil Jurkovec	37/56, 313 yards, 2 TDs
Boston College	Rushing	David Bailey	7 carries, 28 yards
Boston College	Receiving	Hunter Long	9 receptions, 96 yards

=== Virginia Tech ===
Virginia Tech at North Carolina

Team	1	2	3	4	Total
No. 19 Hokies	0	14	23	8	45
• No. 8 Tar Heels	21	14	7	14	56

- Date: October 10, 2020
- Location: Kenan Stadium
  Chapel Hill, NC
- Game start: 12:06 p.m. EDT
- Elapsed time: 3 hours and 47 minutes
- Game attendance: 3,535
- Game weather: Temperature: 65 °F (18 °C) • Weather: Light Rain • Wind: NNE 1 MPH
- Referee: Gary Patterson
- TV announcers (ABC): Bob Wischusen (play–by–play), Dan Orlovsky (analyst), and Jerry Punch (sideline)

Scoring summary
1	10:22	NC	Javonte Williams 1-yard run (Grayson Atkins kick) (11 plays, 75 yards, 4:38)	NC 7–0
1	07:52	NC	Dyami Brown 37-yard pass from Sam Howell (Grayson Atkins kick) (5 plays, 83 yards, 1:15)	NC 14–0
1	04:09	NC	Javonte Williams 19-yard run (Grayson Atkins kick) (7 plays, 66 yards, 2:25)	NC 21–0
2	14:13	VT	James Mitchell 1-yard run (Brian Johnson kick) (11 plays, 75 yards, 4:56)	NC 21–7
2	06:28	VT	Khalil Herbert 8-yard run (Brian Johnson kick) (9 plays, 70 yards, 4:15)	NC 21–14
2	04:17	NC	Dazz Newsome 6-yard run (Grayson Atkins kick) (5 plays, 75 yards, 2:11)	NC 28–14
2	00:16	NC	Dyami Brown 43-yard pass from Sam Howell (Grayson Atkins kick) (4 plays, 58 yards, 0:55)	NC 35–14
3	9:55	VT	Brian Johnson 55-yard field goal (11 plays, 37 yards, 5:05)	NC 35–17
3	07:14	NC	Michael Carter 16-yard run (Grayson Atkins kick) (6 plays, 75 yards, 2:41)	NC 42–17
3	05:58	VT	Hendon Hooker 5-yard run (Brian Johnson kick) (4 plays, 75 yards, 1:16)	NC 42–24
3	05:04	VT	Khalil Herbert 52-yard run (Brian Johnson kick) (3 plays, 54 yards, 0:54)	NC 42–31
3	00:15	VT	Tayvion Robinson 33-yard pass from Hendon Hooker (pass failed) (8 plays, 77 yards, 3:26)	NC 42–37
4	12:37	NC	Dazz Newsome 12-yard pass from Sam Howell (Grayson Atkins kick) (6 plays, 75 yards, 2:32)	NC 49–37
4	08:49	NC	Michael Carter 62-yard run (Grayson Atkins kick) (4 plays, 78 yards, 2:25)	NC 56–37
4	05:20	VT	James Mitchell 26-yard pass from Hendon Hooker (rush) (8 plays, 77 yards, 3:23)	NC 56–45

Statistics	Virginia Tech	North Carolina
First downs	25	31
Total yards	495	656
Rushing yards	260	399
Passing yards	235	257
Turnovers	0	0
Time of possession	32:06	27:54

Team	Category	Player	Statistics
Virginia Tech	Passing	Hendon Hooker	7/13, 136 yards, 2 TDs
Virginia Tech	Rushing	Khalil Herbert	18 carries, 138 yards, 2 TDs
Virginia Tech	Receiving	James Mitchell	4 receptions, 103 yards, 1 TD
North Carolina	Passing	Sam Howell	18/23, 257 yards, 3 TDs
North Carolina	Rushing	Michael Carter	17 carries, 214 yards, 2 TDs
North Carolina	Receiving	Dyami Brown	3 receptions, 86 yards, 2 TDs

=== At Florida State ===
North Carolina at Florida State

Team	1	2	3	4	Total
No. 5 Tar Heels	0	7	14	7	28
• Seminoles	7	24	0	0	31

- Date: October 17, 2020
- Location: Doak Campbell Stadium
  Tallahassee, FL
- Game start: 7:49 p.m. EDT
- Elapsed time: 3 hours and 43 minutes
- Game attendance: 18,016
- Game weather: Temperature: 74 °F (23 °C) • Weather: Clear • Wind: NE 4 MPH
- Referee: Duane Heydt
- TV announcers (ABC): Sean McDonough (play–by–play), Todd Blackledge (analyst), Todd McShay (sideline), and Molly McGrath (sideline)

Scoring summary
1	12:40	FS	Jordan Travis 23-yard run (Ryan Fitzgerald kick) (1 plays, 23 yards, 0:07)	FS 7–0
2	12:59	FS	Ryan Fitzgerald 24-yard field goal (8 plays, 91 yards, 2:57)	FS 10–0
2	03:29	FS	Jordan Travis 1-yard run (Ryan Fitzgerald kick) (9 plays, 75 yards, 3:38)	FSU 17–0
2	02:46	FS	Joshua Kaindoh 25-yard interception return (Ryan Fitzgerald kick) (3 plays, 7 yards, 0:43)	FS 24–0
2	01:02	NC	Javonte Williams 1-yard run (Grayson Atkins kick) (8 plays, 75 yards, 1:44)	FS 24–7
2	00:17	FS	Camren McDonald 12-yard pass from Jordan Travis (Ryan Fitzgerald kick) (5 plays, 75 yards, 0:45)	FS 31–7
3	04:07	NC	Javonte Williams 38-yard pass from Sam Howell (Garrett Walston pass) (4 plays, 49 yards, 1:20)	FS 31–15
3	00:01	NC	Beau Corrales 33-yard pass from Sam Howell (Javonte Williams pass failed) (5 plays, 84 yards, 2:14)	FS 31–21
4	04:58	NC	Dyami Brown 28-yard pass from Sam Howell (Grayson Atkins kick) (7 plays, 80 yards, 1:42)	FS 31–28

Statistics	North Carolina	Florida State
First downs	27	16
Total yards	558	432
Rushing yards	184	241
Passing yards	374	191
Turnovers	1	1
Time of possession	33:51	26:09

Team	Category	Player	Statistics
North Carolina	Passing	Sam Howell	20/36, 374 yards, 3 TDs, 1 INT
North Carolina	Rushing	Javonte Williams	18 carries, 119 yards, 1 TD
North Carolina	Receiving	Beau Corrales	4 receptions, 141 yards, 1 TD
Florida State	Passing	Jordan Travis	8/19, 191 yards, 1 TD, 1 INT
Florida State	Rushing	La'Damian Webb	12 carries, 109 yards
Florida State	Receiving	Ontaria Wilson	2 receptions, 61 yards

=== NC State ===
NC State at North Carolina

Team	1	2	3	4	Total
No. 23 Wolfpack	0	7	7	7	21
• No. 14 Tar Heels	7	10	21	10	48

- Date: October 24, 2020
- Location: Kenan Stadium
  Chapel Hill, NC
- Game start: 12:02 p.m. EDT
- Elapsed time: 3 hours and 33 minutes
- Game attendance: 3,535
- Game weather: Temperature: 77 °F (25 °C) • Weather: Sunny • Wind: WSW 4 MPH
- Referee: Jeff Flanagan
- TV announcers (ESPN): Dave Pasch (play–by–play), Mike Golic (analyst), and Marty Smith (sideline)

Scoring summary
1	08:59	NC	Michael Carter 16-yard run (Grayson Atkins kick) (10 plays, 75 yards, 4:26)	NC 7–0
2	11:59	NC	Sam Howell 10-yard run (Grayson Atkins kick) (8 plays, 67 yards, 2:38)	NC 14–0
2	00:54	NCSU	Emeka Emezie 42-yard pass from Ben Finley (Christopher Dunn kick) (9 plays, 80 yards, 2:21)	NC 14–7
2	00:00	NC	Grayson Atkins 40-yard field goal (7 plays, 52 yards, 0:54)	NC 17–7
3	08:56	NC	Josh Downs 17-yard pass from Sam Howell (Grayson Atkins kick) (4 plays, 60 yards, 1:35)	NC 24–7
3	03:11	NC	Javonte Williams 1-yard run (Grayson Atkins kick) (11 plays, 99 yards, 3:53)	NC 31–7
3	01:27	NC	Javonte Williams 5-yard run (Grayson Atkins kick) (3 plays, 9 yards, 1:33)	NC 38–7
3	00:35	NCSU	Bailey Hockman 1-yard run (Christopher Dunn kick) (4 plays, 75 yards, 0:52)	NC 38–14
4	14:11	NC	Javonte Williams 27-yard run (Grayson Atkins kick) (3 plays, 45 yards, 1:22)	NC 45–14
4	07:40	NC	Grayson Atkins 34-yard field goal (6 plays, 24 yards, 3:39	NC 48–14
4	06:23	NCSU	Anthony Smith 30-yard pass from Bailey Hockman (Christopher Dunn kick) (7 plays, 75 yards, 1:17)	NC 48–21

Statistics	NC State	North Carolina
First downs	23	34
Total yards	392	578
Rushing yards	34	326
Passing yards	358	252
Turnovers	4	0
Time of possession	20:52	39:08

Team	Category	Player	Statistics
NC State	Passing	Bailey Hockman	14/24, 215 yards, 1 TD, 1 INT
NC State	Rushing	Zonovan Knight	9 carries, 41 yards
NC State	Receiving	Emeka Emezie	4 receptions, 84 yards, 1 TD
North Carolina	Passing	Sam Howell	18/29, 252 yards, 1 TD
North Carolina	Rushing	Javonte Williams	19 carries, 160 yards, 3 TD
North Carolina	Receiving	Dyami Brown	7 receptions, 105 yards

=== At Virginia ===
North Carolina at Virginia

Team	1	2	3	4	Total
No. 15 Tar Heels	10	10	7	14	41
• Cavaliers	13	14	14	3	44

- Date: October 31, 2020
- Location: Scott Stadium
  Charlottesville, VA
- Game start: 8:05 p.m. EDT
- Elapsed time: 3 hours and 14 minutes
- Game attendance: 1,000
- Game weather: Temperature: 46 °F (8 °C) • Weather: Clear • Wind: 0 MPH
- Referee: Stuart Mullins
- TV announcers (ACCN): Dave O'Brien (play–by–play), Matt Hasselbeck (analyst), and Katie George (sideline)

Scoring summary
1	13:35	NC	Dyami Brown 54-yard pass from Sam Howell (Grayson Atkins kick) (4 plays, 75 yards, 1:25)	NC 7–0
1	09:05	VA	Brennan Armstrong 23-yard run (Brian Delaney kick failed) (10 plays, 75 yards, 4:30)	NC 7–6
1	05:28	NC	Grayson Atkins 51-yard field goal (7 plays, 42 yards, 3:37)	NC 10–6
1	04:51	VA	Shane Simpson 71-yard pass from Brennan Armstrong (Brian Delaney kick) (2 plays, 75 yards, 0:37)	VA 13–10
2	12:33	NC	Grayson Atkins 30-yard field goal (16 plays, 62 yards, 7:18)	TIE 13–13
2	10:42	NC	Khafre Brown 76-yard pass from Sam Howell (Grayson Atkins kick) (1 play, 76 yards, 0:12)	NC 20–13
2	07:45	VA	Ra'Shaun Henry 18-yard pass from Brennan Armstrong (Brian Delaney kick) (8 plays, 75 yards, 2:57)	TIE 20–20
2	01:14	VA	Keytaon Thompson 1-yard run (Brian Delaney kick) (3 plays, 20 yards, 0:42)	VA 27–20
3	10:01	VA	Wayne Taulapapa 2-yard run (Brian Delaney kick) (11 plays, 75 yards, 4:59)	VA 34–20
3	05:34	VA	Tony Poljan 17-yard pass from Brennan Armstrong (Brian Delaney kick) (5 plays, 30 yards, 2:46)	VA 41–20
3	00:51	NC	Dyami Brown 10-yard pass from Sam Howell (Grayson Atkins kick) (11 plays, 75 yards, 4:43)	VA 41–27
4	13:09	NC	Dyami Brown 13-yard pass from Sam Howell (Grayson Atkins kick) (6 plays, 48 yards, 1:46)	VA 41–34
4	04:07	VA	Brian Delaney 35-yard field goal (15 plays, 58 yards, 9:02)	VA 44–34
4	02:51	NC	Javonte Williams 3-yard run (Grayson Atkins kick) (4 plays, 75 yards, 1:16)	VA 44–41

Statistics	North Carolina	Virginia
First downs	24	28
Total yards	536	418
Rushing yards	93	210
Passing yards	443	208
Turnovers	2	1
Time of possession	25:26	34:34

Team	Category	Player	Statistics
North Carolina	Passing	Sam Howell	23/28, 443 yards, 4 TDs
North Carolina	Rushing	Michael Carter	9 carries, 64 yards
North Carolina	Receiving	Dyami Brown	11 receptions, 240 yards, 3 TDs
Virginia	Passing	Brennan Armstrong	12/22, 208 yards, 3 TDs, 1 INT
Virginia	Rushing	Shane Simpson	8 carries, 70 yards
Virginia	Receiving	Shane Simpson	1 reception, 71 yards, 1 TD

=== At Duke ===
North Carolina at Duke

Team	1	2	3	4	Total
• Tar Heels	21	21	7	7	56
Blue Devils	0	10	7	7	24

- Date: November 7, 2020
- Location: Wallace Wade Stadium
  Durham, NC
- Game start: 12:01 p.m. EST
- Elapsed time: 3 hours and 25 minutes
- Game attendance: 0
- Game weather: Temperature: 72 °F (22 °C) • Weather: Partly Cloudy • Wind: NE 6 MPH
- Referee: Duane Heydt
- TV announcers (ESPN2): Roy Philpott (play–by–play), Kelly Stouffer (analyst), and Alex Chappell (sideline)

Scoring summary
1	12:39	NC	Javonte Williams 2-yard pass from Sam Howell (Grayson Atkins kick) (8 plays, 50 yards, 2:21)	NC 7–0
1	10:07	NC	Sam Howell 3-yard run (Grayson Atkins kick) (3 plays, 66 yards, 1:10)	NC 14–0
1	02:06	NC	Javonte Williams 4-yard run (Grayson Atkins kick) (10 plays, 80 yards, 4:16)	NC 21–0
2	14:43	NC	Michael Carter 22-yard pass from Sam Howell (Grayson Atkins kick) (3 plays, 21 yards, 0:47)	NC 28–0
2	09:32	DU	Eli Pancol 22-yard run (Charlie Ham kick) (12 plays, 75 yards, 5:11)	NC 28–7
2	06:00	NC	Javonte Williams 32-yard run (Grayson Atkins kick) (10 plays, 65 yards, 3:32)	NC 35–7
2	01:55	NC	Javonte Williams 33-yard run (Grayson Atkins kick) (7 plays, 71 yards, 2:15	NC 42–7
2	00:01	DU	Charlie Ham 29-yard field goal (8 plays, 64 yards, 1:54)	NC 42–10
3	13:52	NC	Dazz Newsome 13-yard pass from Sam Howell (Grayson Atkins kick) (3 plays, 28 yards, 1:02)	NC 49–10
3	12:30	DU	Mataeo Durant 46-yard run (Charlie Ham kick) (4 plays, 75 yards, 1:22)	NC 49–17
4	13:08	NC	Michael Carter 12-yard run (Grayson Atkins kick) (5 plays, 65 yards, 1:47)	NC 56–17
4	05:36	DU	Jordan Waters 2-yard run (Charlie Ham kick) (10 plays, 51 yards, 4:00)	NC 56–24

Statistics	North Carolina	Duke
First downs	30	26
Total yards	573	411
Rushing yards	338	185
Passing yards	235	226
Turnovers	1	2
Time of possession	30:56	29:04

Team	Category	Player	Statistics
North Carolina	Passing	Sam Howell	18/27, 235 yards, 3 TDs, 1 INT
North Carolina	Rushing	Javonte Williams	12 carries, 151 yards, 3 TDs
North Carolina	Receiving	Emery Simmons	2 receptions, 67 yards
Duke	Passing	Chase Brice	11/23, 155 yards, 1 INT
Duke	Rushing	Mataeo Durant	11 carries, 132 yards, 1 TD
Duke	Receiving	Darrell Harding Jr.	5 receptions, 70 yards

=== Wake Forest ===
Wake Forest at North Carolina

Team	1	2	3	4	Total
Demon Deacons	14	21	10	8	53
• Tar Heels	17	7	7	28	59

- Date: November 14, 2020
- Location: Kenan Stadium
  Chapel Hill, NC
- Game start: 12:03 p.m. EST
- Elapsed time: 3 hours and 39 minutes
- Game attendance: 3,535
- Game weather: Temperature: 60 °F (16 °C) • Weather: Sunny • Wind: ESE 2 MPH
- Referee: Gary Patterson
- TV announcers (ACCN): Dave O'Brien (play–by–play), Matt Hasselbeck (analyst), and Katie George (sideline)

Scoring summary
1	7:58	WF	Kenneth Walker III 1-yard run (Nick Sciba kick) (9 plays, 62 yards, 3:09)	WF 7–0
1	7:47	NC	Dazz Newsome 75-yard pass from Sam Howell (Grayson Atkins kick) (1 play, 75 yards, 0:11)	TIE 7–7
1	3:01	NC	Grayson Atkins 26-yard field goal (8 plays, 79 yards, 2:59)	NC 10–7
1	2:06	WF	Jaquarii Roberson 40-yard pass from Sam Hartman (Nick Sciba kick) (3 plays, 80 yards, 0:50)	WF 14–10
1	0:29	NC	Dyami Brown 23-yard pass from Sam Howell (Grayson Atkins kick) (6 plays, 75 yards, 1:37)	NC 17–14
2	14:55	WF	Donavon Greene 17-yard pass from Sam Hartman (Nick Sciba kick) (3 plays, 65 yards, 0:34)	WF 21–17
2	12:45	NC	Dazz Newsome 44-yard pass from Sam Howell (Grayson Atkins kick) (5 plays, 75 yards, 2:10)	NC 24–21
2	10:26	WF	Sam Hartman 0-yard fumble recovery (Nick Sciba kick) (8 plays, 75 yards, 2:19)	WF 28–24
2	1:28	WF	Kenneth Walker III 1-yard run (Nick Sciba kick) (9 plays, 85 yards, 3:57)	WF 35–24
3	12:30	WF	Nick Sciba 41-yard field goal (9 plays, 52 yards, 2:30)	WF 38–24
3	6:56	WF	Donavon Greene 18-yard pass from Sam Hartman (Nick Sciba kick) (11 plays, 71 yards, 4:22)	WF 45–24
3	4:43	NC	Dyami Brown 4-yard pass from Sam Howell (Grayson Atkins kick) (6 plays, 75 yards, 2:13)	WF 45–31
4	14:51	NC	Michael Carter 46-yard pass from Sam Howell (Grayson Atkins kick) (4 plays, 74 yards, 1:03)	WF 45–38
4	8:19	NC	Garrett Walston 10-yard pass from Sam Howell (Grayson Atkins kick) (10 plays, 89 yards, 4:23)	TIE 45–45
4	4:11	NC	Sam Howell 20-yard run (Grayson Atkins kick) (9 plays, 81 yards, 3:19)	NC 52–45
4	2:39	NC	Javonte Williams 15-yard run (Grayson Atkins kick) (2 plays, 15 yards, 0:51)	NC 59–45
4	0:57	WF	Jaquarii Roberson 5-yard pass from Sam Hartman (Brandon Chapman pass) (8 plays, 75 yards, 1:42)	NC 59–53

Statistics	Wake Forest	North Carolina
First downs	30	30
Total yards	606	742
Rushing yards	177	192
Passing yards	429	550
Turnovers	0	1
Time of possession	28:48	31:12

Team	Category	Player	Statistics
Wake Forest	Passing	Sam Hartman	29/45, 429 yards, 4 TDs
Wake Forest	Rushing	Christian Beal-Smith	17 carries, 120 yards
Wake Forest	Receiving	Donavon Greene	8 receptions, 170 yards, 2 TDs
North Carolina	Passing	Sam Howell	32/45, 550 yards, 6 TDs, 1 INT
North Carolina	Rushing	Javonte Williams	13 carries, 101 yards, 1 TD
North Carolina	Receiving	Dazz Newsome	10 receptions, 189 yards, 2 TDs

=== Notre Dame ===
Notre Dame at North Carolina

Team	1	2	3	4	Total
• No. 2 Fighting Irish	14	3	7	7	31
No. 19 Tar Heels	14	3	0	0	17

- Date: November 27, 2020
- Location: Kenan Stadium
  Chapel Hill, NC
- Game start: 3:41 p.m. EST
- Elapsed time: 3 hours and 13 minutes
- Game attendance: 3,535
- Game weather: Temperature: 65 °F (18 °C) • Weather: Clear • Wind: NNE 5 MPH
- Referee: Duane Heydt
- TV announcers (ABC): Chris Fowler (play–by–play), Kirk Herbstreit (analyst), and Katie George (sideline)

Scoring summary
1	09:56	NC	Emery Simmons 6-yard pass from Sam Howell (Grayson Atkins kick) (7 plays, 50 yards, 2:54)	NC 7–0
1	05:19	ND	Kyren Williams 2-yard run (Jonathan Doerer kick) (9 plays, 75 yards, 4:37)	TIE 7–7
1	02:59	NC	Sam Howell 1-yard run (Grayson Atkins kick) (7 plays, 75 yards, 2:20)	NC 14–7
1	01:05	ND	Kyren Williams 4-yard pass from Ian Book (Jonathan Doerer kick) (4 plays, 82 yards, 1:50)	TIE 14–14
2	01:10	NC	Grayson Atkins 42-yard field goal (12 plays, 72 yards, 4:40)	NC 17–14
2	00:00	ND	Jonathan Doerer 32-yard field goal (7 plays, 61 yards, 1:10)	TIE 17–17
3	07:05	ND	Ben Skowronek 13-yard run (Jonathan Doerer kick) (13 plays, 97 yards, 5:22)	ND 24–17
4	01:20	ND	Kyren Williams 1-yard run (Jonathan Doerer kick) (8 plays, 89 yards, 4:32)	ND 31–17

Statistics	Notre Dame	North Carolina
First downs	25	14
Total yards	478	298
Rushing yards	199	87
Passing yards	279	211
Turnovers	1	0
Time of possession	35:04	24:56

Team	Category	Player	Statistics
Notre Dame	Passing	Ian Book	23/33, 279 yards, 1 TD
Notre Dame	Rushing	Kyren Williams	23 carries, 124 yards, 2 TDs
Notre Dame	Receiving	Javon McKinley	6 receptions, 135 yards
North Carolina	Passing	Sam Howell	17/27, 211 yards, 1 TD
North Carolina	Rushing	Michael Carter	8 carries, 57 yards
North Carolina	Receiving	Dyami Brown	4 receptions, 84 yards

=== Western Carolina ===
Western Carolina at North Carolina

Team	1	2	3	4	Total
Catamounts	3	0	0	6	9
• No. 17 Tar Heels	21	21	7	0	49

- Date: December 5, 2020
- Location: Kenan Stadium
  Chapel Hill, NC
- Game start: 12:03 p.m. EST
- Elapsed time: 2 hours and 54 minutes
- Game attendance: 3,535
- Game weather: Temperature: 51 °F (11 °C) • Weather: Mostly Cloudy • Wind: NW 9 MPH
- Referee: Gary Patterson
- TV announcers (ACCN): Wes Durham (play–by–play), Roddy Jones (analyst), and Lericia Harris (sideline)

Scoring summary
1	09:05	NC	Michael Carter 17-yard run (Grayson Atkins kick) (9 plays, 71 yards, 3:06)	NC 7–0
1	04:27	WC	Paxton Robertson 40-yard field goal (10 plays, 52 yards, 4:38)	NC 7–3
1	03:22	NC	Antoine Green 22-yard pass from Sam Howell (Grayson Atkins kick) (4 plays, 58 yards, 1:05)	NC 14–3
1	00:52	NC	Michael Carter 22-yard run (Grayson Atkins kick) (3 plays, 54 yards, 1:17)	NC 21–3
2	05:39	NC	Javonte Williams 3-yard run (Grayson Atkins kick) (10 plays, 88 yards, 3:45)	NC 28–3
2	01:36	NC	Michael Carter 5-yard run (Grayson Atkins kick) (5 plays, 47 yards, 1:11)	NC 35–3
2	00:49	NC	Dazz Newsome 26-yard pass from Sam Howell (Grayson Atkins kick) (2 plays, 50 yards, 0:11)	NC 42–3
3	00:18	NC	D.J. Jones 2-yard run (Noah Ruggles kick) (9 plays, 50 yards, 4:57)	NC 49–3
4	05:56	WC	Nigel Manns 42-yard fumble recovery (Richard McCollum kick blocked)	NC 49–9

Statistics	Western Carolina	North Carolina
First downs	13	31
Total yards	253	540
Rushing yards	137	231
Passing yards	116	309
Turnovers	1	3
Time of possession	31:44	28:16

Team	Category	Player	Statistics
Western Carolina	Passing	Will Jones	7/14, 55 yards
Western Carolina	Rushing	Donnavan Spencer	13 carries, 52 yards
Western Carolina	Receiving	Owen Cosenke	2 receptions, 44 yards
North Carolina	Passing	Sam Howell	20/23, 287 yards, 2 TDs
North Carolina	Rushing	Michael Carter	8 carries, 73 yards, 3 TDs
North Carolina	Receiving	Dazz Newsome	6 receptions, 82 yards, 1 TD

=== At Miami (FL) ===
North Carolina at Miami (FL)

Team	1	2	3	4	Total
• No. 17 Tar Heels	21	13	7	21	62
No. 10 Hurricanes	3	7	8	8	26

- Date: December 12, 2020
- Location: Hard Rock Stadium
  Miami Gardens, FL
- Game start: 3:41 p.m. EST
- Elapsed time: 3 hours and 27 minutes
- Game attendance: 12,092
- Game weather: Temperature: 74 °F (23 °C) • Weather: Cloudy • Wind: W 7 MPH
- Referee: Jeff Flanagan
- TV announcers (ABC): Chris Fowler (play–by–play), Kirk Herbstreit (analyst), and Maria Taylor (sideline)

Scoring summary
1	11:46	UM	José Borregales 47–yard field goal (10 plays, 50 yards, 3:14)	UM 3–0
1	8:53	NC	Javonte Williams 2–yard run (Grayson Atkins kick) (6 plays, 75 yards, 2:53)	NC 7–3
1	2:33	NC	Javonte Williams 1–yard run (Grayson Atkins kick) (11 plays, 71 yards, 4:59)	NC 14–3
1	0:15	NC	Michael Carter 65–yard run (Grayson Atkins kick) (1 play, 65 yards, 0:11)	NC 21–3
2	10:48	NC	Grayson Atkins 21–yard field goal (6 plays, 76 yards, 2:58)	NC 24–3
2	7:09	NC	Michael Carter 25–yard run (Grayson Atkins kick) (3 plays, 67 yards, 1:34)	NC 31–3
2	3:05	NC	Grayson Atkins 25–yard field goal (5 plays, 84 yards, 1:19)	NC 34–3
2	0:10	UM	Michael Harley 2–yard pass from D'Eriq King (José Borregales kick) (12 plays, 75 yards, 2:55)	NC 34–10
3	7:24	NC	Sam Howell 2–yard run (Grayson Atkins kick) (13 plays, 75 yards, 7:36)	NC 41–10
3	6:49	UM	Brevin Jordan 76–yard pass from D'Eriq King (Dee Wiggins pass from D'Eriq King) (2 plays, 75 yards, 0:35)	NC 41–18
4	14:16	NC	Sam Howell 1–yard pass from Rontavius Groves (Grayson Atkins kick) (8 plays, 76 yards, 4:20)	NC 48–18
4	12:42	UM	Cam'Ron Harris 6–yard run (Will Mallory pass from D'Eriq King) (6 plays, 68 yards, 1:34)	NC 48–26
4	11:00	NC	Kamari Morales 5–yard pass from Sam Howell (Grayson Atkins kick) (4 plays, 46 yards, 1:42)	NC 55–26
4	3:58	NC	Javonte Williams 1–yard run (Grayson Atkins kick) (10 plays, 75 yards, 6:39)	NC 62–26

Statistics	North Carolina	Miami (FL)
First downs	31	15
Total yards	778	314
Rushing yards	554	75
Passing yards	224	239
Turnovers	1	0
Time of possession	40:19	19:41

Team	Category	Player	Statistics
North Carolina	Passing	Sam Howell	14/19, 223 yards, 1 TD
North Carolina	Rushing	Michael Carter	24 carries, 308 yards, 2 TDs
North Carolina	Receiving	Dyami Brown	4 receptions, 167 yards
Miami (FL)	Passing	D'Eriq King	18/30, 239 yards, 2 TDs, 1 INT
Miami (FL)	Rushing	D'Eriq King	11 carries, 53 yards
Miami (FL)	Receiving	Brevin Jordan	6 receptions, 140 yards, 1 TD

=== Vs. Texas A&M (Orange Bowl) ===
North Carolina vs. Texas A&M
(Orange Bowl)

Team	1	2	3	4	Total
• No. 5 Aggies	7	10	0	24	41
No. 13 Tar Heels	3	10	7	7	27

- Date: January 2, 2021
- Location: Hard Rock Stadium
  Miami Gardens, FL
- Game start: 8:10 p.m. EST
- Elapsed time: 3 hours and 29 minutes
- Game attendance: 13,737
- Game weather: Temperature: 73 °F (23 °C) • Weather: Clear and 74% Relative Humidity • Wind: SE 4 MPH
- Referee: Larry Smith
- TV announcers (ESPN/1stTm): Bob Wischusen (play–by–play), Dan Orlovsky (analyst), and Katie George (sideline)/Bill Roth (play-by-play) and Hans Olsen (analyst)

Scoring summary
1	09:11	TAMU	Isaiah Spiller 9–yard run (Seth Small kick) (7 plays, 28 yards, 3:31)	TAMU 7–0
1	04:31	NC	Grayson Atkins 29–yard field goal (11 plays, 63 yards, 4:40)	TAMU 7–3
2	11:09	NC	Grayson Atkins 32–yard field goal (11 plays, 36 yards, 5:48)	TAMU 7–6
2	07:40	TAMU	Seth Small 25–yard field goal (7 plays, 68 yards, 3:29)	TAMU 10–6
2	04:56	NC	Dazz Newsome 28–yard pass from Sam Howell (Grayson Atkins kick) (8 plays, 75 yards, 2:44)	NC 13–10
2	00:20	TAMU	Isaiah Spiller 3–yard run (Seth Small kick) (8 plays, 75 yards, 4:36)	TAMU 17–13
3	08:01	NC	Josh Downs 10–yard pass from Sam Howell (Grayson Atkins kick) (9 plays, 66 yards, 3:25)	NC 20–17
4	14:02	TAMU	Seth Small 23–yard field goal (12 plays, 74 yards, 5:31)	TIE 20–20
4	13:51	NC	Josh Downs 75–yard pass from Sam Howell (Grayson Atkins kick) (1 play, 75 yards, 0:11)	NC 27–20
4	10:11	TAMU	Kellen Mond 4–yard run (Seth Small kick) (7 plays, 75 yards, 3:40)	TIE 27–27
4	03:44	TAMU	De’Von Achane 76–yard run (Seth Small kick) (3 plays, 87 yards, 1:23)	TAMU 34–27
4	01:34	TAMU	De’Von Achane 1–yard run (Seth Small kick) (3 plays, 34 yards, 0:50)	TAMU 41–27

Statistics	Texas A&M	North Carolina
First downs	19	18
Total yards	457	324
Rushing yards	225	90
Passing yards	232	234
Turnovers	0	0
Time of possession	32:13	27:47

Team	Category	Player	Statistics
Texas A&M	Passing	Kellen Mond	16/26, 232 yards
Texas A&M	Rushing	De’Von Achane	12 carries, 140 yards, 2 TDs
Texas A&M	Receiving	Ainias Smith	6 receptions, 125 yards
North Carolina	Passing	Sam Howell	18/31, 234 yards, 3 TDs, 1 INT
North Carolina	Rushing	British Brooks	15 carries, 53 yards
North Carolina	Receiving	Josh Downs	4 receptions, 91 yards, 2 TDs

== Players drafted into the NFL ==
Round	Pick	Player	Position	NFL team
2	35	Javonte Williams	RB	Denver Broncos
3	78	Chazz Surratt	ILB	Minnesota Vikings
3	82	Dyami Brown	WR	Washington Football Team
4	107	Michael Carter	RB	New York Jets
6	221	Dazz Newsome	WR	Chicago Bears
