= 2020 NC State Wolfpack football team =

American college football season

2020 NC State Wolfpack football

Gator Bowl, L 21–23 vs. Kentucky
- Conference: Atlantic Coast Conference
- Record: 8–4 (7–3 ACC)
- Head coach: Dave Doeren (8th season)
- Offensive coordinator: Tim Beck (1st season)
- Co-offensive coordinator: George McDonald (2nd season)
- Offensive scheme: Spread option
- Defensive coordinator: Tony Gibson (2nd season)
- Base defense: 3–3–5
- Home stadium: Carter–Finley Stadium

2020 Atlantic Coast Conference football standings
	Conf.			Overall
Team	W		L	W		L
No. 5 Notre Dame y^	9	–	0	10	–	2
No. 3 Clemson y$^	8	–	1	10	–	2
No. 22 Miami (FL)	7	–	2	8	–	3
No. 18 North Carolina	7	–	3	8	–	4
NC State	7	–	3	8	–	4
Boston College	5	–	5	6	–	5
Pittsburgh	5	–	5	6	–	5
Virginia Tech	5	–	5	5	–	6
Virginia	4	–	5	5	–	5
Wake Forest	3	–	4	4	–	5
Georgia Tech	3	–	6	3	–	7
Louisville	3	–	7	4	–	7
Florida State	2	–	6	3	–	6
Duke	1	–	9	2	–	9
Syracuse	1	–	9	1	–	10
Championship: Clemson 34, Notre Dame 10
^ – College Football Playoff participant; $ – Conference champion; y – Championship game participant; Rankings from AP Poll.

The 2020 NC State Wolfpack football team represented North Carolina State University during the 2020 NCAA Division I FBS football season. The Wolfpack played their home games at Carter–Finley Stadium in Raleigh, North Carolina, and competed in the Atlantic Coast Conference (ACC). They were led by eighth-year head coach Dave Doeren. The Wolfpack finished the regular season 8–3, 7–3 in ACC play to finish in a tie for fourth place in the conference. They received an invite to the 2021 Gator Bowl where they lost to opponent Kentucky of the SEC.

== Schedule ==
NC State had games scheduled against Delaware, Mississippi State, and Troy, which were canceled due to the COVID-19 pandemic.

Date	Time	Opponent	Rank	Site	TV	Result	Attendance
September 19, 2020	8:00 p.m.	Wake Forest		Carter–Finley Stadium; Raleigh, NC (rivalry)	ACCN	W 45–42	350
September 26	8:00 p.m.	at No. 20 Virginia Tech		Lane Stadium; Blacksburg, VA	ACCN	L 24–45	1,000
October 3	12:00 p.m.	at No. 24 Pittsburgh		Heinz Field; Pittsburgh, PA	ACCN	W 30–29	0 (Behind closed doors)
October 10	12:00 p.m.	at Virginia		Scott Stadium; Charlottesville, VA	ACCN	W 38–21	1,000
October 17	3:30 p.m.	Duke		Carter–Finley Stadium; Raleigh, NC (rivalry)	ACCRSN	W 31–20	4,032
October 24	12:00 p.m.	at No. 14 North Carolina	No. 23	Kenan Stadium; Chapel Hill, NC (rivalry)	ESPN	L 21–48	3,535
November 6	7:30 p.m.	No. 11 Miami		Carter–Finley Stadium; Raleigh, NC	ESPN	L 41–44	4,032
November 14	7:30 p.m.	Florida State		Carter–Finley Stadium; Raleigh, NC	ACCN	W 38–22	4,032
November 21	7:30 p.m.	No. 21 Liberty*		Carter–Finley Stadium; Raleigh, NC	ACCRSN	W 15–14	4,032
November 28	12:00 p.m.	at Syracuse		Carrier Dome; Syracuse, NY	ACCN	W 36–29	0 (Behind closed doors)
December 5	4:00 p.m.	Georgia Tech		Carter–Finley Stadium; Raleigh, NC	ACCN	W 23–13	4,032
January 2, 2021	12:00 p.m.	vs. Kentucky*	No. 24	TIAA Bank Field; Jacksonville, FL (Gator Bowl)	ESPN	L 21–23	10,422
*Non-conference game; Rankings from AP Poll released prior to the game; All times are in Eastern time

Schedule source:

The ACC released their schedule on July 29, with specific dates announced on August 6.

== Rankings ==
Ranking movements Legend: ██ Increase in ranking ██ Decrease in ranking — = Not ranked RV = Received votes
	Week																	
Poll	Pre	1	2	3	4	5	6	7	8	9	10	11	12	13	14	15	16	Final
AP	—	—*	—	—	—	RV	RV	23	—	—	—	—	—	RV	RV	24	24	RV
Coaches	—	—*	—	RV	—	RV	RV	22	RV	RV	—	—	RV	RV	24	23	22	
CFP	Not released												—	—	23	22	23	Not released

== Coaching staff ==
Name	Title
Dave Doeren	Head Coach
Tim Beck	Offensive Coordinator/Quarterbacks
Tony Gibson	Defensive Coordinator/Linebackers
George McDonald	Assistant Head Coach/Passing Game Coordinator/Wide Receivers
Charlie Wiles	Defensive Line
Joe DeForest	Safeties
Todd Goebbel	Tight Ends/Special Teams
Freddie Aughtry-Lindsay	Nickels
John Garrison	Offensive Line
Kurt Roper	Running Backs
Brian Mitchell	Cornerbacks
Ruffin McNeill	Senior advisor to head coach

== Game summaries ==
=== Wake Forest ===
Wake Forest Demon Deacons at NC State Wolfpack − Game summary

Quarter	1	2	3	4	Total
Demon Deacons	7	14	14	7	42
Wolfpack	14	7	14	10	45

at Carter–Finley Stadium • Raleigh, NC

- Date: September 19, 2020
- Game time: 8:00 p.m.
- Game weather: Temperature: 60 °F (16 °C) • Wind: N 3 mph (4.8 km/h) • Weather: Cloudy
- Game attendance: 0
- Referee: Stuart Mullins
- TV announcers (ACCN): Dave O'Brien, Tim Hasselbeck, and Katie George
- Sources:,

Game information

First quarter

- 13:04 NCSU TD – Zonovan Knight 30 yard run (Christopher Dunn PAT)
- 07:43 NCSU TD – Bailey Hockman 7 yard run (Christopher Dunn PAT)
- 03:17 WAKE TD – Sam Hartman 5 yard pass to Jaquarii Roberson (Nick Sciba PAT)

Second quarter

- 13:36 NCSU TD – Ricky Person Jr. 1 yard run (Christopher Dunn PAT)
- 10:38 WAKE TD – Christian Beal-Smith 11 yard run (Nick Sciba PAT)
- 00:36 WAKE TD – Kenneth Walker III 2 yard run (Nick Sciba PAT)

Third quarter

- 11:42 NCSU TD – Ricky Person Jr. 2 yard pass to Devin Carter (Christopher Dunn PAT)
- 08:56 NCSU TD – Bailey Hockman 15 yard pass to Cary Angeline (Christopher Dunn PAT)
- 06:53 WAKE TD – Ja'Sir Taylor 45 yard interception return (Nick Sciba PAT)
- 01:24 WAKE TD – Kenneth Walker III 13 yard run (Nick Sciba PAT)

Fourth quarter

- 13:19 NCSU FG – Dunn 30 yard field goal
- 09:12 WAKE TD – Kenneth Walker III 2 yard run (Nick Sciba PAT)
- 05:51 NCSU TD – Ricky Person Jr. 3 yard run (Christopher Dunn PAT)

Top passers

- WAKE – Sam Hartman: 23–36, 236 yards, 1 TD
- NCSU – Bailey Hockman: 16–23, 191 yards, 1 TD

Top rushers

- WAKE – Kenneth Walker III: 27 rushes, 131 yards, 3 TD
- NCSU – Ricky Person Jr.: 14 rushes, 99 yards, 2 TD

Top Receiving

- WAKE – Jaquarii Roberson: 7 receptions, 75 yards, 1 TD
- NCSU – Cary Angeline: 2 receptions, 45 yards, 1 TD

=== At Virginia Tech ===
NC State Wolfpack at Virginia Tech Hokies − Game summary

Quarter	1	2	3	4	Total
Wolfpack	0	10	7	7	24
No. 20 Hokies	17	14	6	8	45

at Lane Stadium • Blacksburg, VA

- Date: September 26, 2020
- Game time: 8:00 p.m.
- Game weather: Temperature: 65 °F (18 °C) • Wind: Calm • Weather: Cloudy
- Game attendance: 1,000
- Referee: Jeff Flanagan
- TV announcers (ACCN): Dave O'Brien, Tim Hasselbeck, and Katie George

Game information

First quarter

- 12:13 VT FG – Brian Johnson 46 yard field goal
- 08:30 VT TD – Khalil Herbert 37 yard run (Brian Johnson PAT)
- 07:11 VT TD – Raheem Blackshear 8 yard run (Brian Johnson PAT)

Second quarter

- 07:22 NCSU TD – Ricky Person Jr. 3 yard run (Christopher Dunn PAT)
- 02:48 VT TD – Quincy Patterson 15 yard pass to Tayvion Robinson (Brian Johnson PAT)
- 00:42 VT TD – Quincy Patterson 16 yard pass to James Mitchell (Brian Johnson PAT)
- 00:00 NCSU FG – Christopher Dunn 53 yard field goal

Third quarter

- 10:35 VT FG – Brian Johnson 29 yard field goal
- 05:22 VT FG – Brian Johnson 49 yard field goal
- 02:18 NCSU TD – Devin Leary 7 yard pass to C. J. Riley (Christopher Dunn PAT)

Fourth quarter

- 08:56 VT TD – Quincy Patterson 1 yard run (Kaleb Smith 2 point conversion)
- 04:03 NCSU TD – Jordan Houston 1 yard run (Christopher Dunn PAT)

Top passers

- NCSU – Devin Leary: 12–16, 165 yards, 1 TD
- VT – Braxton Burmeister: 7–11, 106 yards

Top rushers

- NCSU – Zonovan Knight: 14 rushes, 94 yards
- VT – Khalil Herbert: 6 rushes, 104 yards, 1 TD

Top Receiving

- NCSU – Devin Carter: 4 receptions, 79 yards
- VT – James Mitchell: 3 receptions, 68 yards, 1 TD

=== At Pittsburgh ===
NC State Wolfpack at Pittsburgh Panthers − Game summary

Quarter	1	2	3	4	Total
Wolfpack	10	7	0	13	30
No. 24 Panthers	7	6	7	9	29

at Heinz Field • Pittsburgh, PA

- Date: October 3, 2020
- Game time: 12:00 p.m.
- Game weather: Temperature: 59 °F (15 °C) • Wind: SSW 4 mph (6.4 km/h) • Weather: Sunny
- Game attendance: 0
- Referee: S. Mullins
- TV announcers (ACCN): Wes Durham, Roddy Jones, and Eric Wood

Game information

First quarter

- 14:32 PITT TD – Kenny Pickett 75 yard pass (Alex Kessman PAT)
- 08:11 NCSU TD – Devin Leary 6 yard pass to Cary Angeline (Christopher Dunn PAT)
- 01:20 NCSU FG – Christopher Dunn 39 yard field goal

Second quarter

- 12:56 NCSU TD – Devin Leary 35 yard pass to Emeka Emezie (Christopher Dunn PAT)
- 04:50 PITT FG – Alex Kessman 27 yard field goal
- 00:04 PITT FG – Alex Kessman 29 yard field goal

Third quarter

- 01:11 PITT TD – Kenny Pickett 1 yard run (Alex Kessman PAT)

Fourth quarter

- 10:52 PITT FG – Alex Kessman 42 yd FG GOOD
- 08:16 NCSU TD – Devin Leary 25 yard pass to Cary Angeline (Christopher Dunn PAT)
- 01:44 PITT TD – Kenny Pickett 1 yard run (Two-Point conversion failed)
- 00:23 NCSU TD – Devin Leary 13 yard pass to Emeka Emezie (Two-Point conversion failed)

Top passers

- NCSU – Devin Leary: 28–44, 336 yards, 4 TD
- PITT – Kenny Pickett: 22–39, 411 yards, 1 TD

Top rushers

- NCSU – Ricky Person Jr.: 14 rushes, 39 yards
- PITT – Kenny Pickett: 15 rushes, 40 yards, 2 TD

Top Receiving

- NCSU – Emeka Emezie: 7 receptions, 101 yards, 2 TD
- PITT – D. J. Turner: 8 receptions, 186 yards

=== At Virginia ===
NC State Wolfpack at Virginia Cavaliers − Game summary

Quarter	1	2	3	4	Total
Wolfpack	14	10	0	14	38
Cavaliers	0	7	7	7	21

at Scott Stadium • Charlottesville, VA

- Date: October 10, 2020
- Game time: 12:00 p.m.
- Game weather: Temperature: 62 °F (17 °C) • Wind: Calm • Weather: Light Rain
- Game attendance: 1,000
- Referee: Jerry Magallanes
- TV announcers (ACCN): Wes Durham, Roddy Jones, and Katie George

Game information

First quarter

- 06:01 NCSU TD – Devin Leary 5 yard pass to Trent Pennix (Christopher Dunn PAT)
- 01:32 NCSU TD – Devin Leary 32 yard pass to Cary Angeline (Christopher Dunn PAT)

Second quarter

- 05:49 NCSU FG – Christopher Dunn 36 yard field goal
- 02:03 NCSU TD – Zonovan Knight 35 yard run (Christopher Dunn PAT)
- 00:15 UVA TD – Lindell Stone 2 yard pass to Billy Kemp IV (Brian Delaney PAT)

Third quarter

- 02:08 UVA TD – Lindell Stone 1 yard pass to Tony Poljan (Brian Delaney PAT)

Fourth quarter

- 11:10 NCSU TD – Alim McNeill 18 yard interception return (Christopher Dunn PAT)
- 06:08 UVA TD – Lindell Stone 2 yard pass to Lavel Davis Jr. (Brian Delaney PAT)
- 01:49 NCSU TD – Zonovan Knight 2 yard run (Christopher Dunn PAT)

Top passers

- NCSU – Devin Leary: 11–25, 184 yards, 2 TD
- UVA – Lindell Stone: 30–54, 240 yards, 3 TD

Top rushers

- NCSU – Zonovan Knight: 18 rushes, 101 yards, 2 TD
- UVA – Shane Simpson: 7 rushes, 37 yards

Top Receiving

- NCSU – Emeka Emezie: 3 receptions, 54 yards
- UVA – Terrell Jana: 9 receptions, 111 yards

=== Duke ===
Duke Blue Devils at NC State Wolfpack − Game summary

Quarter	1	2	3	4	Total
Blue Devils	7	13	0	0	20
Wolfpack	0	14	7	10	31

at Carter–Finley Stadium • Raleigh, NC

- Date: October 17, 2020
- Game time: 3:30 p.m.
- Game weather: Temperature: 62 °F (17 °C) • Wind: SE 5 mph (8.0 km/h) Weather: Mostly Cloudy
- Game attendance: 4,032
- TV announcers (ACCRSN): Tom Werme, James Bates, and Lyndsay Rowley

Game information

First quarter

- 09:51 DUKE TD – Dorian Mausi 32 yard punt return (Ham PAT)

Second quarter

- 14:55 DUKE FG – Charlie Ham 46 yard field goal
- 10:44 NCSU TD – Jordan Houston 1 yard (Christopher Dunn PAT)
- 03:43 DUKE TD – Chase Brice 8 yard pass to Jake Bobo (Charlie Ham PAT)
- 00:45 NCSU TD – Max Fisher 8 yard return of blocked punt (Christopher Dunn PAT)
- 00:00 DUKE FG – Charlie Ham 29 yard field goal

Third quarter

- 04:01 NCSU TD – Devin Leary 4 yard pass to Cary Angeline (Christopher Dunn PAT)

Fourth quarter

- 14:55 NCSU TD – Bailey Hockman 9 yard pass to Thayer Thomas (Christopher Dunn PAT)
- 03:17 NCSU FG – Christopher Dunn 39 yard field goal

Top passers

- DUKE – Chase Brice: 24–40, 190 yards, 1 TD
- NCSU – Devin Leary: 15–25, 205 yards, 1 TD

Top rushers

- DUKE – Chase Brice: 14 rushes, 86 yards
- NCSU – Ricky Person Jr: 14 rushes, 73 yards

Top Receiving

- DUKE – Jake Bobo: 6 receptions, 62 yards, 1 TD
- NCSU – Emeka Emezie: 4 receptions, 87 yards

=== At North Carolina ===
NC State Wolfpack at North Carolina Tar Heels − Game summary

Quarter	1	2	3	4	Total
No. 23 Wolfpack	0	7	7	7	21
No. 14 Tar Heels	7	10	21	10	48

at Kenan Memorial Stadium • Chapel Hill, NC

- Date: October 24, 2020
- Game time: 12:00 p.m.
- Game weather: Temperature: 77 °F (25 °C) • Wind: WSW 4 mph (6.4 km/h) • Weather: Sunny
- Game attendance: 3,535
- Referee: Jeff Flanagan
- TV announcers (ESPN): Dave Pasch, Mike Golic, and Marty Smith

Game information

First quarter

- 08:59 UNC TD – Michael Carter 16 yard run (Grayson Atkins PAT)

Second quarter

- 11:59 UNC TD – Sam Howell 10 yard run (Grayson Atkins PAT)
- 00:54 NCSU TD – Ben Finley 42 yard pass to Emeka Emezie (Christopher Dunn PAT)
- 00:00 UNC FG – Grayson Atkins 40 yard field goal

Third quarter

- 08:56 UNC TD – Sam Howell 17 yard pass to Josh Downs (Grayson Atkins PAT)
- 03:11 UNC TD – Javonte Williams 1 yard run (Grayson Atkins PAT)
- 01:27 UNC TD – Javonte Williams 5 yard run (Grayson Atkins PAT)
- 00:35 NCSU TD – Bailey Hockman 1 yard run (Christopher Dunn PAT)

Fourth quarter

- 14:11 UNC TD – Javonte Williams 27 yard run (Grayson Atkins PAT)
- 07:40 UNC FG – Grayson Atkins 34 yard field goal
- 06:23 NCSU TD – Bailey Hockman 30 yard pass to Anthony Smith (Christopher Dunn PAT)

Top passers

- NCSU – Bailey Hockman: 14–24, 215 yards, 1 TD
- UNC – Sam Howell: 18–29, 252 yards, 1 TD

Top rushers

- NCSU – Zonovan Knight: 9 rushes, 41 yards
- UNC – Javonte Williams: 19 rushes, 160 yards, 3 TD

Top Receiving

- NCSU – Emeka Emezie: 4 receptions, 84 yards, 1 TD
- UNC – Dyami Brown: 7 receptions, 105 yards

=== Miami ===
Miami Hurricanes at NC State Wolfpack − Game summary

Quarter	1	2	3	4	Total
No. 11 Hurricanes	14	7	10	13	44
Wolfpack	14	10	14	3	41

at Carter–Finley Stadium • Raleigh, NC

- Date: November 6, 2020
- Game time: 7:30 p.m.
- Game weather: Temperature: 64 °F (18 °C) • Wind: Calm • Weather: Partly Cloudy
- Game attendance: 4,032
- Referee: Marcus Woods
- TV announcers (ESPN): Jason Benetti, Andre Ware, and Marty Smith

Game information

First quarter

- 12:44 NCSU TD – Thayer Thomas 31 yard pass to Bailey Hockman (Christopher Dunn PAT)
- 09:21 MIA TD – D'Eriq King 3 yard pass to Will Mallory (Andres Borregales PAT)
- 06:31 NCSU TD – Bailey Hockman 31 yard pass to Devin Carter (Christopher Dunn PAT)
- 03:14 MIA TD – D'Eriq King 39 yard pass to Dee Wiggins (Andres Borregales PAT)

Second quarter

- 13:34 MIA TD – D'Eriq King 20 yard pass to Mike Harley Jr. (Andres Borregales PAT)
- 09:35 NCSU FG – Christopher Dunn 42 yard field goal
- 02:49 NCSU TD – Bailey Hockman 31 yard pass to Cary Angeline (Christopher Dunn PAT)

Third quarter

- 11:26 MIA FG – Andres Borregales 36 yard field goal
- 07:17 NCSU TD – Zonovan Knight 1 yard run (Christopher Dunn PAT)
- 05:00 MIA TD – D'Eriq King 17 yard pass to Mark Pope (Andres Borregales PAT)
- 04:45 NCSU TD – Zonovan Knight 100 yard kickoff return (Christopher Dunn PAT)

Fourth quarter

- 14:55 NCSU FG – Christopher Dunn 53 yard field goal
- 11:04 MIA FG – Andres Borregales 38 yard field goal
- 06:12 MIA FG – Andres Borregales 22 yard field goal
- 02:43 MIA TD – D'Eriq King 54 yard pass to Mike Harley Jr. (Andres Borregales PAT)

Top passers

- MIA – D'Eriq King: 31–41, 430 yards, 5 TD
- NCSU – Bailey Hockman: 19–28, 248 yards, 2 TD

Top rushers

- MIA – D'Eriq King: 15 rushes, 105 yards
- NCSU – Ricky Person Jr: 12 rushes, 79 yards

Top Receiving

- MIA – Mike Harley Jr.: 8 receptions, 153 yards, 2 TD
- NCSU – Emeka Emezie: 4 receptions, 95 yards

=== Florida State ===
Florida State Seminoles at NC State Wolfpack − Game summary

Quarter	1	2	3	4	Total
Seminoles	0	3	6	13	22
Wolfpack	7	14	14	3	38

at Carter–Finley Stadium • Raleigh, NC

- Date: November 14, 2020
- Game time: 7:30 p.m.
- Game weather: Temperature: 59 °F (15 °C) • Wind: WNW 4 mph (6.4 km/h) • Weather: Partly Cloudy
- Game attendance: 4,032
- Referee: Stuart Mullins
- TV announcers (ACCN): Wes Durham, Roddy Jones, and Lericia Harris

Game information

First quarter

- 10:01 NCSU TD – Bailey Hockman 21 yard pass to Emeka Emezie (Christopher Dunn PAT)

Second quarter

- 13:18 NCSU TD – Bailey Hockman 10 yard pass to Thayer Thomas (Christopher Dunn PAT)
- 08:11 FSU FG – Parker Grothaus 48 yard field goal
- 01:32 NCSU TD – Bailey Hockman 4 yard run (Christopher Dunn PAT)

Third quarter

- 10:34 NCSU TD – Zonovan Knight 18 yard run (Christopher Dunn PAT)
- 05:14 FSU TD – Jashuan Corbin 28 yard run (2 point conversion failed)
- 02:09 NCSU TD – Bailey Hockman 24 yard pass to Thayer Thomas (Christopher Dunn PAT)

Fourth quarter

- 09:54 FSU TD – Chubba Purdy 69 yard pass to Ontaria Wilson (Parker Grothaus PAT)
- 04:35 NCSU FG – Christopher Dunn 32 yard field goal
- 01:41 FSU TD – Chubba Purdy 24 yard pass to Warren Thompson (2 point conversion failed)

Top passers

- FSU – Chubba Purdy: 15–23, 181 yards, 2 TD
- NCSU – Bailey Hockman: 24–34, 265 yards, 3 TD

Top rushers

- FSU – Jashaun Corbin: 14 rushes, 77 yards, 1 TD
- NCSU – Zonovan Knight: 17 rushes, 94 yards, 1 TD

Top Receiving

- FSU – Ontaria Wilson: 7 receptions, 117 yards, 1 TD
- NCSU – Thayer Thomas: 11 receptions, 135 yards, 2 TD

=== Liberty ===
Liberty Flames at NC State Wolfpack − Game summary

Quarter	1	2	3	4	Total
No. 21 Flames	0	7	7	0	14
Wolfpack	0	7	2	6	15

at Carter–Finley Stadium • Raleigh, NC

- Date: November 21, 2020
- Game time: 7:30 p.m.
- Game weather: Temperature: 57 °F (14 °C) • Wind: Calm • Weather: Partly Cloudy
- Game attendance: 4,032
- Referee: Jeff Flanagan
- TV announcers (ACCRSN): Tom Werme, James Bates, and Kelly Crull

Game information

First quarter

- No scoring plays

Second quarter

- 06:56 NCSU TD – Zonovan Knight 19 yard run (Christopher Dunn PAT)
- 00:19 LU TD – Malik Willis 12 yard pass to Noah Frith (Alex Barbir PAT)

Third quarter

- 07:11 LU TD – Malik Willis 12 yard pass to Jerome Jackson (Alex Barbir PAT)
- 03:34 NCSU SAF – Isaiah Moore 3 yard safety

Fourth quarter

- 06:53 NCSU TD – Zonovan Knight 4 yard run (2 point conversion failed)

Top passers

- LU – Malik Willis: 13–32, 171 yards, 2 TD
- NCSU – Bailey Hockman: 14–27, 154 yards

Top rushers

- LU – Joshua Mack: 12 rushes, 49 yards
- NCSU – Zonovan Knight: 14 rushes, 96 yards, 2 TD

Top Receiving

- LU – Noah Frith: 4 receptions, 73 yards, 1 TD
- NCSU – Emeka Emezie: 1 reception, 55 yards

=== At Syracuse ===
NC State Wolfpack at Syracuse Orange − Game summary

Quarter	1	2	3	4	Total
Wolfpack	7	7	13	9	36
Orange	7	15	7	0	29

at Carrier Dome • Syracuse, NY

- Date: November 28, 2020
- Game time: 12:00 p.m.
- Game attendance: 0
- Referee: Jerry Magallane
- TV announcers (ACCN): Wes Durham, Roddy Jones

Game information

First quarter

- 07:38 NCSU TD – Zonovan Knight fumble recovery (Christopher Dunn PAT)
- 07:25 CUSE TD – Trebor Peña 98 yard kickoff return (Andre Szmyt PAT)

Second quarter

- 13:40 CUSE FG – Andre Szmyt 45 yard field goal
- 13:09 CUSE FG – Andrer Szmyt 23 yard field goal
- 06:05 NCSU TD – Bailey Hockman 15 yard pass to Thayer Thomas (Christopher Dunn PAT)
- 03:23 CUSE TD – Rex Culpepper 60 yard pass to Courtney Jackson (Andre Szmyt PAT)
- 03:12 CUSE SAF – Bailey Hockman fumbles in endzone

Third quarter

- 12:35 NCSU TD – Bailey Hockman 31 yard pass to Thayer Thomas (Two-point conversion failed)
- 05:49 CUSE TD – Rex Culpepper 13 yard pass to Taj Harris (Szmyt PAT)
- 02:22 NCSU TD – Bailey Hockman 8 yard pass to Thayer Thomas (Christopher Dunn PAT)

Fourth quarter

- 14:14 NCSU TD – Bailey Hockman 26 yard pass to Emeka Emezie (Two-point conversion failed)
- 05:20 NCSU FG – Christopher Dunn 31 yard field goal

Top passers

- NCSU – Bailey Hockman: 23–31, 313 yards, 4 TD
- CUSE – Rex Culpepper: 23–45, 254 yards, 2 TD

Top rushers

- NCSU – Ricky Person Jr.: 17 rushes, 61 yards
- CUSE – Sean Tucker: 16 rushes, 18 yards

Top Receiving

- NCSU – Thayer Thomas: 9 receptions, 102 yards, 3 TD
- CUSE – Taj Harris: 13 receptions, 146 yards, 1 TD

=== Georgia Tech ===
Georgia Tech Yellow Jackets at NC State Wolfpack − Game summary

Quarter	1	2	3	4	Total
Yellow Jackets	0	7	3	3	13
Wolfpack	3	17	0	3	23

at Carter–Finley Stadium • Raleigh, NC

- Date: December 5, 2020
- Game time: 4:00 p.m.
- Game weather: Temperature: 52 °F (11 °C) • Wind: 10 mph (16 km/h) • Weather: Clear
- Game attendance: 4,032
- Referee: Riley Johnson
- TV announcers (ACCN): Chris Cotter, Mark Herzlich, and Eric Wood

Game information

First quarter

- 05:19 NCSU FG – Christopher Dunn 42 yard field goal

Second quarter

- 14:52 NCSU TD – Ricky Person Jr. 20 yard run (Christopher Dunn PAT)
- 12:20 GT TD – Jeff Sims 34 yard run (Stewart PAT)
- 10:12 NCSU TD – Zonovan Knight 5 yard run (Christopher Dunn PAT)
- 03:53 NCSU FG – Christopher Dunn 20 yard field goal

Third quarter

- 08:53 GT FG – Gavin Stewart 26 yard field goal

Fourth quarter

- 11:32 GT FG – Gavin Stewart 22 yard field goal
- 03:31 NCSU FG – Christopher Dunn 39 yard field goal

Top passers

- GT – Jeff Sims: 13–27, 151 yards
- NCSU – Bailey Hockman: 23–36, 309 yards

Top rushers

- GT – Jordan Mason: 21 rushes, 97 yards
- NCSU – Ricky Person Jr.: 15 rushes, 59 yards, 1 TD

Top Receiving

- GT – Adonicas Sanders: 7 receptions, 105 yards
- NCSU – Emeka Emezie: 6 receptions, 91 yards

=== Vs. Kentucky–Gator Bowl ===
NC State Wolfpack vs Kentucky − Game summary

Quarter	1	2	3	4	Total
No. 23 Wolfpack	0	0	7	14	21
Wildcats	3	10	0	10	23

at TIAA Bank Field • Jacksonville, FL

- Date: January 2, 2021
- Game time: 12:00 p.m.
- Game weather: Temperature: 78 °F (26 °C) • Wind: 14 mph (23 km/h) • Weather: Clear
- Game attendance: 10,422
- Referee: Reggie Smith
- TV announcers (ESPN/Touchdown Radio): Anish Shroff, Tom Luginbill, and Lericia Harris/J. P. Shadrick and Gino Torretta

Game information

First quarter

- 06:00 UK FG – Matt Ruffolo 25 yard field goal

Second quarter

- 06:23 UK TD – Chris Rodriguez Jr. 4 yard run (Matt Ruffolo PAT)
- 00:02 UK FG – Matt Ruffolo 26 yard field goal

Third quarter

- 02:56 NCSU TD – Bailey Hockman 9 yard pass to C. J. Riley (Christopher Dunn PAT)

Fourth quarter

- 05:45 UK FG – Matt Ruffolo 20 yard field goal
- 04:46 NCSU TD – Zonovan Knight 13 yard run (Christopher Dunn PAT)
- 02:55 UK TD – Chris Rodriguez Jr. 26 yard run (Matt Ruffolo PAT)
- 01:10 NCSU TD – Jordan Houston 2 yard run (Christopher Dunn PAT)

Top passers

- NCSU – Bailey Hockman: 27–40, 268 yards, 1 TD, 3 INTs
- UK – Terry Wilson: 13–21, 91 yards

Top rushers

- NCSU – Zonovan Knight: 12 rushes, 52 yards, 1 TD
- UK – A. J. Rose: 12 rushes, 148 yards

Top Receiving

- NCSU – Thayer Thomas: 3 receptions, 46 yards
- UK – Keaton Upshaw: 2 receptions, 25 yards

== Players drafted into the NFL ==
Round	Pick	Player	Position	NFL Club
3	72	Alim McNeill	DT	Detroit Lions
