= 2020 Virginia Tech Hokies football team =

American college football season

2020 Virginia Tech Hokies football
- Conference: Atlantic Coast Conference
- Record: 5–6 (5–5 ACC)
- Head coach: Justin Fuente (5th season)
- Offensive coordinator: Brad Cornelsen (5th season)
- Offensive scheme: Spread
- Defensive coordinator: Justin Hamilton (1st season)
- Base defense: 4–3
- Home stadium: Lane Stadium

Uniform
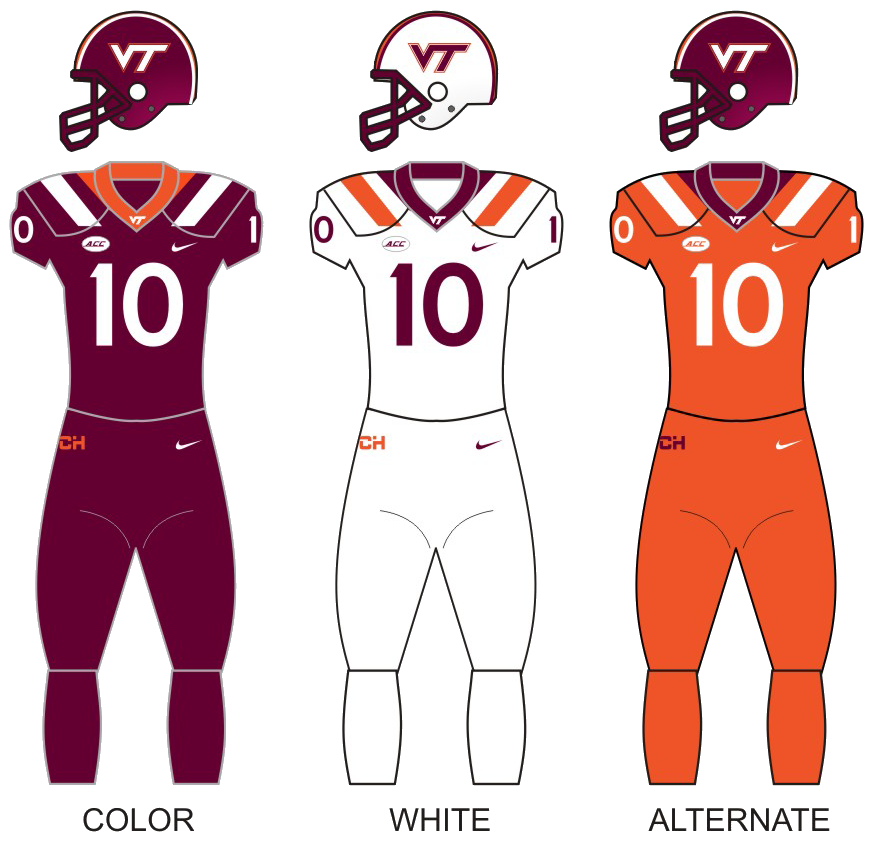

2020 Atlantic Coast Conference football standings
	Conf.			Overall
Team	W		L	W		L
No. 5 Notre Dame y^	9	–	0	10	–	2
No. 3 Clemson y$^	8	–	1	10	–	2
No. 22 Miami (FL)	7	–	2	8	–	3
No. 18 North Carolina	7	–	3	8	–	4
NC State	7	–	3	8	–	4
Boston College	5	–	5	6	–	5
Pittsburgh	5	–	5	6	–	5
Virginia Tech	5	–	5	5	–	6
Virginia	4	–	5	5	–	5
Wake Forest	3	–	4	4	–	5
Georgia Tech	3	–	6	3	–	7
Louisville	3	–	7	4	–	7
Florida State	2	–	6	3	–	6
Duke	1	–	9	2	–	9
Syracuse	1	–	9	1	–	10
Championship: Clemson 34, Notre Dame 10
^ – College Football Playoff participant; $ – Conference champion; y – Championship game participant; Rankings from AP Poll.

The 2020 Virginia Tech Hokies football team represented Virginia Tech during the 2020 NCAA Division I FBS football season. The Hokies were led by fifth-year head coach Justin Fuente and played their home games at Lane Stadium in Blacksburg, Virginia, competing as members of the Atlantic Coast Conference (ACC).

After completing their regular season with a 5–6 record (5–5 in ACC play), the program announced on December 16 that players had voted to end their season and would not consider a bid to a bowl game. The Hokies had appeared in a bowl game for 27 consecutive seasons, dating back to the 1993 Independence Bowl. This was fourth-longest streak of consecutive bowl game appearances in college football history.

== Coaching staff ==
Virginia Tech Hokies coaches
Name	Title	Joined staff
Justin Fuente	Head coach	2016
Brad Cornelsen	Offensive coordinator/quarterbacks coach	2016
Vance Vice	Offensive line coach	2016
Jafar Williams	Wide receivers coach	2019
Adam Lechtenberg	Running back coach	2017
Justin Hamilton	Defensive coordinator/Safeties coach	2018
Tracy Claeys	Linebackers coach	2020
Bill Teerlinck	Defensive line coach	2020
Darryl Tapp	Co-Defensive line coach	2020
James Shibest	Special teams coordinator/Tight end coach	2016
Ryan Smith	Cornerbacks coach	2020
Ben Hilgart	Strength and conditioning	2016

== Schedule ==
Virginia Tech had games scheduled against Liberty, Middle Tennessee, North Alabama, and Penn State, which were all canceled due to the COVID-19 pandemic.

The ACC released their schedule on July 29, with specific dates selected at a later date.

Date	Time	Opponent	Rank	Site	TV	Result	Attendance
September 26	8:00 p.m.	NC State	No. 20	Lane Stadium; Blacksburg, VA	ACCN	W 45–24	1,000
October 3	4:00 p.m.	at Duke		Wallace Wade Stadium; Durham, NC	ACCN	W 38–31	0
October 10	12:00 p.m.	at No. 8 North Carolina	No. 19	Kenan Memorial Stadium; Chapel Hill, NC	ABC	L 45–56	3,535
October 17	8:00 p.m.	Boston College	No. 23	Lane Stadium; Blacksburg, VA (rivalry)	ACCN	W 40–14	1,000
October 24	3:30 p.m.	at Wake Forest	No. 19	Truist Field at Wake Forest; Winston–Salem, NC	ACCRSN	L 16–23	2,135
October 31	4:00 p.m.	at Louisville		Cardinal Stadium; Louisville, KY	ACCN	W 42–35	11,901
November 7	12:00 p.m.	No. 25 Liberty*		Lane Stadium; Blacksburg, VA	ACCN	L 35–38	1,000
November 14	12:00 p.m.	No. 9 Miami (FL)		Lane Stadium; Blacksburg, VA (rivalry)	ESPN	L 24–25	1,000
November 21	4:00 p.m.	at Pittsburgh		Heinz Field; Pittsburgh, PA	ACCN	L 14–47	4,612
December 5	7:30 p.m.	No. 3 Clemson		Lane Stadium; Blacksburg, VA	ABC	L 10–45	250
December 12	8:00 p.m.	Virginia		Lane Stadium; Blacksburg, VA (Commonwealth Cup)	ACCN	W 33–15	250
*Non-conference game; Rankings from AP Poll and CFP Rankings after November 24 released prior to game; All times are in Eastern time

Schedule source:

== Game summaries ==
=== NC State ===
NC State at Virginia Tech

Team	1	2	3	4	Total
Wolfpack	0	10	7	7	24
• No. 20 Hokies	17	14	6	8	45

- Date: September 26, 2020
- Location: Lane Stadium
  Blacksburg, VA
- Game start: 8:05 p.m. EDT
- Elapsed time: 3 hours and 19 minutes
- Game attendance: 1,000
- Game weather: 65 °F (18 °C) • Weather: Cloudy, cool • Wind: Calm
- Referee: Jeff Flanagan
- TV announcers (ACC Network): Dave O'Brien (play–by–play), Tim Hasselbeck (analyst), and Katie George (sideline reporter)

Scoring summary
1	12:13	VT	Brian Johnson 46-yard field goal (6 plays, 46 yards, 2:47)	VT 0–3
1	08:30	VT	Khalil Herbert 37-yard rush (Brian Johnson kick) (3 plays, 64 yards, 1:30)	VT 0–10
1	07:11	VT	Raheem Blackshear 8-yard rush (Brian Johnson kick) (3 plays, 33 yards, 0:53)	VT 0–17
2	07:22	NCST	Ricky Person Jr. 3-yard rush (Christopher Dunn kick) (7 plays, 49 yards, 1:57)	VT 7–17
2	02:48	VT	Tayvion Robinson 15-yard pass from Quincy Patterson II (Brian Johnson kick) (10 plays, 75 yards, 4:34)	VT 7–24
2	00:42	VT	James Mitchell 16-yard pass from Quincy Patterson II (Brian Johnson kick) (3 plays, 74 yards, 1:06)	VT 7–31
2	00:00	NCST	Christopher Dunn 53-yard field goal (5 plays, 46 yards, 0:36)	VT 10–31
3	10:35	VT	Brian Johnson 29-yard field goal (4 plays, −1 yards, 0:56)	VT 10–34
3	05:22	VT	Brian Johnson 49-yard field goal (7 plays, 48 yards, 3:39)	VT 10–37
3	02:18	NCST	C. J. Riley 7-yard pass from Devin Leary (Christopher Dunn kick) (8 plays, 75 yards, 3:04)	VT 17–37
4	08:56	VT	Quincy Patterson II 1-yard rush (Braxton Burmeister two-point conversion pass to Kaleb Smith) (3 plays, 50 yards, 1:30)	VT 17–45
4	04:03	NCST	Jordan Houston 1-yard rush (Christopher Dunn kick) (10 plays, 75 yards, 4:53)	VT 24–45

Statistics	NC State	Virginia Tech
First downs	19	22
Total yards	386	495
Rushing yards	139	314
Passing yards	247	181
Turnovers	2	0
Time of possession	30:55	29:05

Team	Category	Player	Statistics
NC State	Passing	Devin Leary	12/16, 165 yards, 1 TD
NC State	Rushing	Zonovan Knight	14 carries, 94 yards
NC State	Receiving	Devin Carter	4 receptions, 79 yards
Virginia Tech	Passing	Braxton Burmeister	7/11, 106 yards
Virginia Tech	Rushing	Khalil Herbert	6 carries, 104 yards, 1 TD
Virginia Tech	Receiving	James Mitchell	3 receptions, 68 yards, 1 TD

=== At Duke ===
Virginia Tech at Duke

Team	1	2	3	4	Total
• Hokies	7	3	14	14	38
Blue Devils	7	0	7	17	31

- Date: October 3, 2020
- Location: Wallace Wade Stadium
  Durham, NC
- Game start: 4:03 p.m. EDT
- Elapsed time: 3 hours and 22 minutes
- Game attendance: 0
- Game weather: 68 °F (20 °C) • Weather: Clear • Wind: SSW 3 MPH
- Referee: Jeff Flanagan
- TV announcers (ACC Network): Chris Cotter (play–by–play), Mark Herzlich (analyst), and Tiffany Blackmon (sideline reporter)

Scoring summary
1	11:37	DUKE	Jaylen Stinson 0-yard fumble returned (Charlie Ham kick) (3 plays, 2 yards, 0:49)	DUKE 0–7
1	04:26	VT	James Mitchell 12-yard pass from Braxton Burmeister (Brian Johnson kick) (6 plays, 60 yards, 2:43)	TIE 7–7
2	03:14	VT	Brian Johnson 21-yard field goal (16 plays, 76 yards, 7:33)	VT 10–7
3	11:27	DUKE	Deon Jackson 10-yard rush (Charlie Ham kick) (8 plays, 77 yards, 2:39)	DUKE 10–14
3	09:17	VT	Braxton Burmeister 2-yard rush (Brian Johnson kick) (6 plays, 16 yards, 1:58)	VT 17–14
3	04:59	VT	Braxton Burmeister 14-yard rush (Brian Johnson kick) (5 plays, 94 yards, 2:30)	VT 24–14
4	13:41	DUKE	Noah Gray 17-yard pass from Chase Brice (Charlie Ham kick) (4 plays, 86 yards, 1:26)	VT 24–21
4	09:58	VT	Khalil Herbert 23-yard rush (Brian Johnson kick) (7 plays, 70 yards, 3:43)	VT 31–21
4	06:44	DUKE	Deon Jackson 1-yard rush (Charlie Ham kick) (9 plays, 75 yards, 3:14)	VT 31–28
4	02:20	VT	Khalil Herbert 60-yard rush (Brian Johnson kick) (4 plays, 73 yards, 1:07)	VT 38–28
4	00:00	DUKE	Charlie Ham 39-yard field goal (15 plays, 54 yards, 2:20)	VT 38–31

Statistics	Virginia Tech	Duke
First downs	25	19
Total yards	487	410
Rushing yards	324	139
Passing yards	163	271
Turnovers	3	1
Time of possession	34:04	25:56

Team	Category	Player	Statistics
Virginia Tech	Passing	Braxton Burmeister	9/25, 163 yards, 1 TD, 1 INT
Virginia Tech	Rushing	Khalil Herbert	20 carries, 208 yards, 2 TDs
Virginia Tech	Receiving	Tayvion Robinson	2 receptions, 85 yards
Duke	Passing	Chase Brice	22/39, 271 yards, 1 TD, 1 INT
Duke	Rushing	Mataeo Durant	11 carries, 86 yards
Duke	Receiving	Jarett Garner	3 receptions, 84 yards

=== At North Carolina ===
Virginia Tech at North Carolina

Team	1	2	3	4	Total
No. 19 Hokies	0	14	23	8	45
• No. 8 Tar Heels	21	14	7	14	56

- Date: October 10, 2020
- Location: Kenan Memorial Stadium
  Chapel Hill, NC
- Game start: 12:06 p.m. EDT
- Elapsed time: 3 hours and 47 minutes
- Game attendance: 3,535
- Game weather: 65 °F (18 °C) • Weather: Light Rain • Wind: NNE 1 MPH
- Referee: Gary Patterson
- TV announcers (ABC): Bob Wischusen (play–by–play), Dan Orlovsky (analyst), and Dr. Jerry Punch (sideline reporter)

Scoring summary
1	10:22	UNC	Javonte Williams 1-yard run (Grayson Atkins kick) (11 plays, 75 yards, 4:38)	UNC 0–7
1	7:52	UNC	Dyami Brown 37-yard pass from Sam Howell (Grayson Atkins kick) (5 plays, 83 yards, 1:15)	UNC 0–14
1	4:09	UNC	Javonte Williams 19-yard run (Grayson Atkins kick) (7 plays, 66 yards, 2:25)	UNC 0–21
2	14:13	VT	James Mitchell 1-yard run (Brian Johnson kick) (11 plays, 75 yards, 4:56)	UNC 7–21
2	6:28	VT	Khalil Herbert 8-yard run (Brian Johnson kick) (9 plays, 70 yards, 4:15)	UNC 14–21
2	4:17	UNC	Dazz Newsome 6-yard run (Grayson Atkins kick) (5 plays, 75 yards, 2:11)	UNC 14–28
2	0:16	UNC	Dyami Brown 43-yard pass from Sam Howell (Grayson Atkins kick) (4 plays, 58 yards, 0:55)	UNC 14–35
3	9:55	VT	Brian Johnson 55-yard FG (11 plays, 37 yards, 5:05)	UNC 17–25
3	7:14	UNC	Michael Carter 16-yard run (Grayson Atkins kick) (6 plays, 75 yards, 2:41)	UNC 17–42
3	5:58	VT	Hendon Hooker 5-yard run (Brian Johnson kick) (4 plays, 75 yards, 1:16)	UNC 24–42
3	5:04	VT	Khalil Herbert 52-yard run (Brian Johnson kick) (3 plays, 54 yards, 0:54)	UNC 31–42
3	0:15	VT	Tayvion Robinson 33-yard pass from Hendon Hooker (2pt. conversion failed) (8 plays, 77 yards, 3:26)	UNC 37–42
4	12:37	UNC	Dazz Newsome 12-yard pass from Sam Howell (Grayson Atkins kick) (6 plays, 75 yards, 2:32)	UNC 37–49
4	8:49	UNC	Michael Carter 62-yard run (Grayson Atkins kick) (4 plays, 78 yards, 2:25)	UNC 37–56
4	5:20	VT	James Mitchell 26-yard pass from Hendon Hooker (Hendon Hooker run for 2pt. conversion) (8 plays, 77 yards, 3:23)	UNC 45–56

Statistics	Virginia Tech	North Carolina
First downs	25	31
Total yards	495	656
Rushing yards	260	399
Passing yards	235	257
Turnovers	0	0
Time of possession	32:06	27:54

Team	Category	Player	Statistics
Virginia Tech	Passing	Hendon Hooker	7/13, 136 yards, 2 TDs
Virginia Tech	Rushing	Khalil Herbert	18 carries, 138 yards, 2 TDs
Virginia Tech	Receiving	James Mitchell	4 receptions, 103 yards, 1 TD
North Carolina	Passing	Sam Howell	18/23, 257 yards, 3 TDs
North Carolina	Rushing	Michael Carter	17 carries, 214 yards, 2 TDs
North Carolina	Receiving	Dyami Brown	3 receptions, 86 yards, 2 TDs

=== Boston College ===
Boston College at Virginia Tech

Team	1	2	3	4	Total
Eagles	0	7	7	0	14
• No. 23 Hokies	3	14	10	13	40

- Date: October 17, 2020
- Location: Lane Stadium
  Blacksburg, VA
- Game start: 8:05 p.m. EDT
- Elapsed time: 3 hours and 11 minutes
- Game attendance: 1,000
- Game weather: 65 °F (18 °C) • Weather: Clear • Wind: NW 5 MPH
- Referee: Riley Johnson
- TV announcers (ACC Network): Dave O'Brian (play-by-play), Tim Hasselbeck (analyst), Katie George (sideline reporter)

Scoring summary
1	01:31	VT	Brian Johnson 41 Yd Field Goal (8 plays, 60 yards, 4:31)	VT 0–3
2	10:57	BC	Jaelen Gill 12 Yd pass from Phil Jurkovec (Aaron Boumerhi Kick) (13 plays, 77 yards, 5:35)	BC 7–3
2	08:53	VT	Hendon Hooker 7 Yd Run (Brian Johnson Kick) (4 plays, 49 yards, 1:59)	VT 10–7
2	02:49	VT	Khalil Herbert 29 Yd pass from Hendon Hooker (Brian Johnson Kick) (7 plays, 74 yards, 3:50)	VT 7–17
3	07:11	BC	Hunter Long 20 Yd pass from Phil Jurkovec (Aaron Boumerhi Kick) (12 plays, 80 yards, 5:45)	VT 14–17
3	03:39	VT	Hendon Hooker 5 Yd Run (Brian Johnson Kick) (6 plays, 79 yards, 3:24)	VT 14–24
3	02:10	VT	Brian Johnson 27 Yd Field Goal (4 plays, 7 yards, 1:17)	VT 14–27
4	13:44	VT	Raheem Blackshear 28 Yd Run (Two-Point Pass Conversion Failed) (6 plays, 65 yards, 1:50)	VT 14–33
4	02:20	VT	Hendon Hooker 17 Yd Run (Brian Johnson Kick) (6 plays, 47 yards, 2:41)	VT 14–40

Statistics	Boston College	Virginia Tech
First downs	24	23
Total yards	435	461
Rushing yards	90	350
Passing yards	345	111
Turnovers	5	0
Time of possession	29:12	30:48

Team	Category	Player	Statistics
Boston College	Passing	Phil Jurkovec	28/51, 345 yards, 2 TDs, 2 INTs
Boston College	Rushing	David Bailey	10 carries, 41 yards
Boston College	Receiving	Jaelen Gill	6 receptions, 104 yards, 1 TD
Virginia Tech	Passing	Hendon Hooker	11/15, 111 yards, 1 TD
Virginia Tech	Rushing	Hendon Hooker	18 carries, 164 yards, 3 TDs
Virginia Tech	Receiving	Khalil Herbert	1 reception, 29 yards, 1 TD

=== At Wake Forest ===
Virginia Tech at Wake Forest

Team	1	2	3	4	Total
No. 19 Hokies	0	10	3	3	16
• Demon Deacons	10	7	3	3	23

- Date: October 24, 2020
- Location: Truist Field at Wake Forest
  Winston–Salem, NC
- Game start: 3:30 p.m. EDT
- Elapsed time: 3 hours and 9 minutes
- Game attendance: 2,135
- Game weather: 79 °F (26 °C) • Weather: Partly cloudy • Wind: W 2 MPH
- Referee: Jeff Heaser
- TV announcers (ACCRSN): Evan Lepler (play–by–play), Brian Jordan (analyst), Abby Labar (sideline reporter)

Scoring summary
1	09:31	VT	Brian Johnson 41 Yd Field Goal (8 plays, 60 yards, 4:31)	VT 0–3
1	02:11	WAKE	Nick Sciba 41 Yd Field Goal (6 plays, 37 yards, 2:09)	WAKE 0–10
2	11:39	VT	Brian Johnson 28 Yd Field Goal (13 plays, 64 yards, 5:32)	WAKE 3–10
2	08:40	VT	James Mitchell 39 Yd pass from Hendon Hooker (Brian Johnson Kick) (4 plays, 70 yards, 1:34)	TIE 10–10
2	01:31	WAKE	Kenneth Walker III 6 Yd Run (Nick Sciba Kick) (17 plays, 75 yards, 7:09)	WAKE 10–17
3	12:23	WAKE	Nick Sciba 46 Yd Field Goal (7 plays, 46 yards, 2:32)	WAKE 10–20
3	01:29	VT	Brian Johnson 31 Yd Field Goal (9 plays, 66 yards, 4:20)	WAKE 13–20
4	11:05	WAKE	Nick Sciba 28 Yd Field Goal (13 plays, 65 yards, 5:24)	WAKE 13–23
4	02:38	VT	Brian Johnson 54 Yd Field Goal (9 plays, 35 yards, 2:32)	WAKE 16–23

Statistics	Virginia Tech	Wake Forest
First downs	28	17
Total yards	433	316
Rushing yards	210	206
Passing yards	223	110
Turnovers	3	0
Time of possession	30:18	29:42

Team	Category	Player	Statistics
Virginia Tech	Passing	Hendon Hooker	17/33, 223 yards, 1 TD, 3 INTs
Virginia Tech	Rushing	Hendon Hooker	17 carries, 98 yards
Virginia Tech	Receiving	Tré Turner	5 receptions, 61 yards
Wake Forest	Passing	Sam Hartman	12/17, 110 yards
Wake Forest	Rushing	Christian Beal-Smith	13 carries, 129 yards
Wake Forest	Receiving	Jaquarii Roberson	6 receptions, 46 yards

=== At Louisville ===
Virginia Tech at Louisville

Team	1	2	3	4	Total
• Hokies	14	7	7	14	42
Cardinals	0	14	0	21	35

- Date: October 31, 2020
- Location: Cardinal Stadium
  Louisville, KY
- Game start: 4:00 p.m. EDT
- Elapsed time: 3 hours and 1 minute
- Game attendance: 11,901
- Game weather: 61 °F (16 °C) • Weather: Sunny • Wind: ESE 10 MPH
- Referee: J. Magallanes
- TV announcers (ACC Network): Wes Durham, Roddy Jones, Eric Wood

Scoring summary
1	10:41	VT	Hendon Hooker 6 Yd Run (Brian Johnson Kick) (5 plays, 53 yards, 2:04)	VT 7–0
1	00:53	VT	Hendon Hooker 3 Yd Run (Brian Johnson Kick) (3 plays, 33 yards, 1:09)	VT 14–0
2	09:28	VT	Hendon Hooker 1 Yd Run (Brian Johnson Kick) (6 plays, 68 yards, 2:59)	VT 21–0
2	06:19	LOU	Marshon Ford 14 Yd pass from Malik Cunningham (James Turner Kick) (6 plays, 62 yards, 3:09)	VT 21–7
2	00:00	LOU	Javian Hawkins 90 Yd Run (James Turner Kick) (3 plays, 85 yards, 0:46)	VT 21–14
3	11:15	VT	Tré Turner 1 Yd Run (Brian Johnson Kick) (7 plays, 63 yards, 3:45)	VT 28–14
4	13:16	VT	Brian Johnson 30 Yd Field Goal (14 plays, 84 yards, 7:09)	VT 31–14
4	11:53	LOU	Dez Fitzpatrick 82 Yd pass from Malik Cunningham (James Turner Kick) (3 plays, 82 yards, 1:23)	VT 31–21
4	09:14	VT	Brian Johnson 41 Yd Field Goal (5 plays, 46 yards, 2:39)	VT 34–21
4	05:36	LOU	Maurice Burkley 13 Yd Run (James Turner Kick) (8 plays, 75 yards, 3:38)	VT 34–28
4	03:23	VT	Khalil Herbert 24 Yd Run (Hendon Hooker Pass to Tré Turner for Two-Point Conversion) (5 plays, 48 yards, 2:13)	VT 42–28
4	01:00	LOU	Javian Hawkins 16 Yd pass from Malik Cunningham (James Turner Kick) (11 plays, 76 yards, 2:23)	VT 42–35

Statistics	Virginia Tech	Louisville
First downs	21	23
Total yards	466	548
Rushing yards	283	198
Passing yards	183	350
Turnovers	0	3
Time of possession	32:11	27:49

Team	Category	Player	Statistics
Virginia Tech	Passing	Hendon Hooker	10/10, 183 yards
Virginia Tech	Rushing	Khalil Herbert	21 carries, 147 yards, 1 TD
Virginia Tech	Receiving	Tré Turner	4 receptions, 71 yards
Louisville	Passing	Malik Cunningham	23/35, 350 yards, 3 TDs, 3 INTs
Louisville	Rushing	Javian Hawkins	17 carries, 129, 1 TD
Louisville	Receiving	Dez Fitzpatrick	5 receptions, 158, 1 TD

=== Liberty ===
Liberty at Virginia Tech

Team	1	2	3	4	Total
• No. 25 Flames	7	7	7	17	38
Hokies	3	17	0	15	35

- Date: November 7, 2020
- Location: Lane Stadium
  Blacksburg, VA
- Game start: 12:00 p.m. EST
- Elapsed time: 3 hours and 22 minutes
- Game attendance: 1,000
- Game weather: 64 °F (18 °C) • Weather: Clear, nice • Wind: W 1 MPH
- Referee: Stuart Mullins
- TV announcers (ACCN): Chris Cotter (play–by–play), Mark Herzlich (analyst), Taylor Davis (sideline reporter)

Scoring summary
1	09:46	LIB	CJ Yarbrough 32 Yd pass from Malik Willis (Alex Barbir Kick) (9 plays, 75 yards, 5:14)	LIB 7–0
1	04:40	VT	Brian Johnson 41 Yd Field Goal (6 plays, 33 yards, 2:21)	LIB 7–3
2	12:11	LIB	Jerome Jackson 2 Yd pass from Malik Willis (Alex Barbir Kick) (14 plays, 80 yards, 7:25)	LIB 14–3
2	08:48	VT	Nick Gallo 3 Yd pass from Hendon Hooker (Brian Johnson Kick) (7 plays, 65 yards, 3:23)	LIB 14–10
2	04:36	VT	Hendon Hooker 12 Yd Run (Brian Johnson Kick) (2 plays, 30 yards, 1:11)	VT 14–17
2	00:01	VT	Brian Johnson 18 Yd Field Goal (12 plays, 90 yards, 1:45)	LIB 14–20
3	12:55	LIB	Malik Willis 19 Yd Run (Alex Barbir Kick) (11 plays, 95 yards, 6:31)	LIB 21–20
4	10:29	LIB	Johnny Huntley 5 Yd pass from Malik Willis (Alex Barbir Kick) (1 play, 6 yards, 0:04)	LIB 28–20
4	05:46	VT	Kaleb Smith 9 Yd pass from Hendon Hooker (Hendon Hooker Pass to Raheem Blackshear for Two-Point Conversion) (10 plays, 75 yards, 4:43)	TIE 28–28
4	01:41	LIB	Peytton Pickett 9 Yd Run (Alex Barbir Kick) (9 plays, 75 yards, 4:05)	LIB 35–28
4	00:52	VT	Tré Turner 12 Yd pass from Hendon Hooker (Brian Johnson Kick) (6 plays, 75 yards, 0:49)	TIE 35–35
4	00:01	LIB	Alex Barbir 51 Yd Field Goal (9 plays, 42 yards, 0:51)	LIB 38–35

Statistics	Liberty	Virginia Tech
First downs	29	24
Total yards	466	418
Rushing yards	249	201
Passing yards	217	217
Turnovers	2	1
Time of possession	37:27	22:33

Team	Category	Player	Statistics
Liberty	Passing	Malik Willis	20/30, 217 yards, 3 TDs
Liberty	Rushing	Malik Willis	19 carries, 108 yards, 1 TD
Liberty	Receiving	CJ Yarbrough	5 receptions, 65 yards, 1 TD
Virginia Tech	Passing	Hendon Hooker	20/27, 217 yards, 3 TDs
Virginia Tech	Rushing	Hendon Hooker	20 carries, 156 yards, 1 TD
Virginia Tech	Receiving	Tré Turner	6 receptions, 90 yards, 1 TD

=== Miami (FL) ===
Miami (FL) at Virginia Tech

Team	1	2	3	4	Total
• No. 9 Hurricanes	3	10	6	6	25
Hokies	7	7	10	0	24

- Date: November 14, 2020
- Location: Lane Stadium
  Blacksburg, VA
- Game start: 12:00 p.m. EST
- Elapsed time:
- Game attendance: 1,000
- Game weather: 56 °F (13 °C) • Weather: Sunny • Wind: SSE 1 MPH
- Referee:
- TV announcers (ESPN2): Roy Philpott (play–by–play), Kelly Stouffer (analyst), and Eric Wood (sideline reporter)

Scoring summary
1	6:01	VT	Hendon Hooker 53-yard run (Brian Johnson kick) (3 plays, 87 yards, 1:03)	VT 7–0
1	0:37	MIA	José Borregales 42 yard field goal (13 plays, 50 yards, 5:24)	VT 7–3
2	8:47	VT	Jalen Holston 8-yard run (Brian Johnson kick) (7 plays, 80 yards, 2:30)	VT 14–3
2	5:11	MIA	D'Eriq King 10-yard run (José Borregales kick) (10 plays, 84 yards, 3:36)	VT 14–10
2	0:04	MIA	José Borregales 40-yard field goal (11 plays, 30 yards, 3:37)	VT 14–13
3	9:29	VT	Jalen Holston 1-yard run (Brian Johnson kick) (11 plays, 74 yards, 3:49)	VT 21–13
3	6:14	VT	Brian Johnson 38-yard field goal (6 plays, 28 yards, 2:13)	VT 24–13
3	1:27	MIA	Cam'Ron Harris 6-yard run (2-point conversion failed) (13 plays, 75 yards, 4:47)	VT 24–19
4	5:59	MIA	Mark Pope 36-yard pass from D'Eriq King (2-point conversion failed) (10 plays, 82 yards, 3:39)	MIA 25–24

Statistics	Miami (FL)	Virginia Tech
First downs	25	23
Total yards	386	361
Rushing yards	131	160
Passing yards	255	201
Turnovers	0	1
Time of possession	32:40	27:24

Team	Category	Player	Statistics
Miami (FL)	Passing	D'Eriq King	24/38, 255 yards, TD
Miami (FL)	Rushing	Cam'Ron Harris	14 carries, 63 yards, TD
Miami (FL)	Receiving	Dee Wiggins	8 receptions, 106 yards
Virginia Tech	Passing	Hendon Hooker	19/29, 201 yards, INT
Virginia Tech	Rushing	Hendon Hooker	21 carries, 59 yards, TD
Virginia Tech	Receiving	Tré Turner	5 receptions, 86 yards

=== At Pittsburgh ===
Virginia Tech at Pittsburgh

Team	1	2	3	4	Total
Hokies	0	14	0	0	14
• Panthers	6	17	17	7	47

- Date: November 21, 2020
- Location: Heinz Field
  Pittsburgh, PA
- Game start: 4:00 p.m. EST
- Elapsed time:
- Game attendance: 4,612
- Game weather: • Weather: TBD • Wind: TBD MPH
- Referee:
- Television network: ACCN

Scoring summary
1
2
3
4

Statistics	Virginia Tech	Pittsburgh
First downs		
Total yards		
Rushing yards		
Passing yards		
Turnovers		
Time of possession		

Team	Category	Player	Statistics
Virginia Tech	Passing		
Virginia Tech	Rushing		
Virginia Tech	Receiving		
Pittsburgh	Passing		
Pittsburgh	Rushing		
Pittsburgh	Receiving		

=== Clemson ===
Clemson at Virginia Tech

Team	1	2	3	4	Total
• No. 3 Tigers	10	7	14	14	45
Hokies	7	3	0	0	10

- Date: December 5, 2020
- Location: Lane Stadium
  Blacksburg, VA
- Game start: 7:30 p.m. EST
- Elapsed time:
- Game attendance: 250
- Game weather: 37 °F (3 °C) • Weather: Cloudy • Wind: NW 8 MPH
- Referee: Jeff Heaser
- TV announcers (ABC): Chris Fowler (play-by-play), Kirk Herbstreit (color), Maria Taylor (sideline)

Scoring summary
1	8:27	CLEM	B. T. Potter 28-yard field goal (7 plays, 61 yards, 2:48)	CLEM 3–0
1	3:45	VT	Khalil Herbert 4-yard run (Brian Johnson kick) (7 plays, 75 yards, 4:42)	VT 7–3
1	0:12	CLEM	Trevor Lawrence 17-yard run (B. T. Potter kick) (10 plays, 75 yards, 3:33)	CLEM 10–7
2	3:52	VT	Brian Johnson 54-yard field goal (6 plays, 13 yards, 3:06)	TIED 10–10
2	1:06	CLEM	Lyn-J Dixon 19-yard run (B. T. Potter kick) (7 plays, 75 yards, 2:46)	CLEM 17–10
3	4:45	CLEM	Trevor Lawrence 7-yard run (B. T. Potter kick) (2 plays, 12 yards, 0:33)	CLEM 24–10
3	1:28	CLEM	Derion Kendrick 66-yard fumble return (B. T. Potter kick) (2 plays, –2 yards, 0:47)	CLEM 31–10
4	10:16	CLEM	Cornell Powell 65-yard pass from Trevor Lawrence (B. T. Potter kick) (2 plays, 49 yards, 0:50)	CLEM 38–10
4	4:01	CLEM	Darien Rencher 50-yard run (B. T. Potter kick) (1 play, 50 yards, 0:08)	CLEM 45–10

Statistics	Clemson	Virginia Tech
First downs	19	18
Total yards	433	333
Rushing yards	238	131
Passing yards	195	202
Turnovers	1	3
Time of possession	22:00	38:00

Team	Category	Player	Statistics
Clemson	Passing	Trevor Lawrence	12/22, 195 yards, TD, INT
Clemson	Rushing	Travis Etienne	16 carries, 66 yards
Clemson	Receiving	Cornell Powell	4 receptions, 90 yards, TD
Virginia Tech	Passing	Braxton Burmeister	10/12, 127 yards
Virginia Tech	Rushing	Khalil Herbert	21 carries, 96 yards, TD
Virginia Tech	Receiving	Raheem Blackshear	4 receptions, 68 yards

=== Virginia ===
Virginia at Virginia Tech

Team	1	2	3	4	Total
Cavaliers	7	0	8	0	15
• Hokies	3	24	3	3	33

- Date: December 12, 2020
- Location: Lane Stadium
  Blacksburg, VA
- Game start: 8:00 p.m. EST
- Elapsed time: 2:59
- Game attendance: 250
- Game weather: 55 °F (13 °C) • Weather: Partly cloudy • Wind: SSW 5 MPH
- Referee: Riley Johnson
- Television network: ACCN

Scoring summary
1
2
3
4

Statistics	Virginia	Virginia Tech
First downs	19	20
Total yards	322	464
Rushing yards	55	252
Passing yards	267	212
Turnovers	2	1
Time of possession	24:42	35:18

Team	Category	Player	Statistics
Virginia	Passing	Brennan Armstrong	25/46, 259 yards, 2 TD, 2 INT
Virginia	Rushing	Brennan Armstrong	15 carries, 23 yards
Virginia	Receiving	Lavel Davis Jr.	3 receptions, 75 yards
Virginia Tech	Passing	Braxton Burmeister	15/22, 212 yards, 1 TD
Virginia Tech	Rushing	Khalil Herbert	20 carries, 162 yards, 1 TD
Virginia Tech	Receiving	Tayvion Robinson	5 receptions, 98 yards, 1 TD

== Rankings ==
Ranking movements Legend: ██ Increase in ranking ██ Decrease in ranking — = Not ranked RV = Received votes
	Week															
Poll	Pre	1	2	3	4	5	6	7	8	9	10	11	12	13	14	Final
AP	RV	RV*	20	20	RV	19	23	19	—	RV						
Coaches	24	24*	19	24	23	18	23	20	RV	RV						
CFP	Not released															Not released

== 2021 NFL draft ==
Round	Pick	Player	Position	NFL team
1	22	Caleb Farley	CB	Tennessee Titans
1	23	Christian Darrisaw	OT	Minnesota Vikings
3	80	Divine Deablo	S	Las Vegas Raiders
6	217	Khalil Herbert	RB	Chicago Bears
