= Jovan Dewitt =

American football player and coach (born 1975)

Current position
- Title: Defensive coordinator
- Team: FIU
- Conference: C-USA

Biographical details
- Born: October 21, 1975 (age 51); Milwaukee, Wisconsin, U.S.

Playing career
- 1993–1996: Northern Michigan
- 1997: Iowa Barnstormers
- 1998: Orlando Predators
- 1999: Fargo Freeze
- Position: Defensive back

Coaching career (HC unless noted)
- 1997: Northern Michigan (SA)
- 2000–2001: Northern Michigan (GA)
- 2002: Fort Scott (STC/RB)
- 2003: Fairmont State (STC/RB)
- 2004–2005: Northern Michigan (DC)
- 2006–2008: St. Norbert (DC)
- 2009–2010: Northern Iowa (LB)
- 2011: Northern Iowa (DC/LB)
- 2012–2013: Florida Atlantic (LB)
- 2014–2015: Army (STC/OLB)
- 2016–2017: UCF (AHC/STC/LB)
- 2018–2019: Nebraska (STC/OLB)
- 2020–2021: North Carolina (STC/OLB)
- 2022–present: FIU (DC)

Jovan Dewitt (born October 21, 1975) is an American football coach and former player who is currently the defensive coordinator at FIU. After an All-American playing career, Dewitt has spent the majority of his coaching career coordinating either special teams or defenses.

== Coaching career ==
=== Early career ===
Immediately following Dewitt's college playing career, he spent some time as a student assistant working with the Northern Michigan defensive line. Following his arena football career, he returned to Northern Michigan for the 2000 and 2001 seasons as a graduate assistant working with the running backs.

Dewitt spent the 2002 and 2003 seasons coordinating special teams and coaching running backs, first at Fort Scott Community College, and then at Fairmont State.

In 2004, Dewitt returned to his alma mater, Northern Michigan, to serve as the defensive coordinator for two seasons. He then served as the defensive coordinator at St. Norbert for three seasons from 2006 to 2008.

=== Northern Iowa ===
In 2009, Dewitt was hired as the linebackers coach at Northern Iowa, replacing Scott Frost. While coaching the panther linebackers, Dewitt coached Panther great, LJ Fort. Fort was named the FCS National Defensive Player of the year following the 2011 season, and went on to have a 10+ year career. He is currently a member of the Baltimore Ravens. Dewitt was promoted to defensive coordinator for the 2011 season.

=== Florida Atlantic ===
In 2012, Dewitt joined Carl Pelini's inaugural staff at Florida Atlantic coaching the linebackers. Midway through the 2013 season Pelini and defensive coordinator Pete Rekstis resigned, and Dewitt was elevated to interim defensive coordinator for the final four games of the season.

=== Army ===
Dewitt was the special teams coordinator and outside linebackers coach at Army for the 2014 and 2015 seasons. Working for Head Coach Todd Monken, Dewitt helped guide the turn around. After winning two games in Dewitt's first season on staff, the Black Knights won 8 games, including the 2016 Heart of Dallas Bowl in the 2015 season. During Dewitt's time at Army, his units blocked 7 kicks, including two punts that were returned for touchdowns.

=== UCF ===
In January 2016, Dewitt was hired by Scott Frost, whom he replaced at Northern Iowa, to coordinate the UCF special teams, and coach the outside linebackers. While helping lead UCF to a perfect season and American Athletic Conference championship, Dewitt mentored Shaquem Griffin. Griffin was the only player to be unanimously selected first team all-AAC. He would go on to be drafted in the 5th round of the 2018 NFL draft by the Seattle Seahawks. Dewitt was promoted to associate head coach prior to the 2017 season.

=== Nebraska ===
Dewitt followed Frost to Nebraska prior to the 2018 season. Here, he again served as the special teams coordinator and outside linebackers coach. Dewitt helped start the rebuild of the Nebraska football program by guiding linebacker Luke Gifford to a career year in which he had 13 tackles for loss, and 5.5 sacks. Gifford's 5.5 sacks were the most by any Nebraska linebacker in 13 years. Dewitt's linebacker unit help Nebraska double their sack total from the previous season. The special teams were also strong, led by a punt coverage unit that allowed 2.3 yards per return in 2019, good for 7th in the nation.

Dewitt also faced major medical issues while at Nebraska. He missed most of spring ball prior to the 2019 season, fighting throat cancer. 38 rounds of radiation and 3 rounds of chemotherapy were endured to get back to doing what he loved. Dewitt lost over 100 pounds during his battle, as well as the ability to produce saliva, at least temporarily. Even while through the intense treatments, Dewitt was watching film and regularly communicating with his fellow coaches and players.

=== North Carolina ===
Prior to the 2020 season, Dewitt was hired by Mack Brown at North Carolina as the special teams coordinator and outside linebackers coach. Both groups have had major success, as Dewitt's linebackers helped the Tar Heel defense produce 36 sacks in 2020, the most since 2000. Receiver Dazz Newsome finished the 2020 season ranked 13th nationally in punt returns. After defensive coordinator Jay Bateman was let go, Dewitt and the university agreed to part ways as well. Because of the change in defensive leadership, a team spokesman stated that "...the duties of the outside linebackers coaching position are expected to change.”

=== FIU ===
After parting ways with North Carolina, Dewitt joined the staff of new Panther head coach Mike MacIntyre as defensive coordinator in January 2022.

=== Recruiting innovation ===
Dewitt created his own recruiting app. The app has features that include forms for prospect information, data tables, rankings, reports, real time notes shared with other staff members, voice recording, geotagging, and film clips. The creation was inspired by his one full time job outside of coaching, when he was working as a mortgage broker and his interactions with different clients were logged.

== Playing career ==
Dewitt was a 4 time letterman at Northern Michigan from 1993 to 1996. He was a two time all conference and all American player, and was named the 1996 Conference Defensive Player of the Year.

Dewitt played professionally for three seasons in the Arena Football League, as a member of the Iowa Barnstormers in 1997, the Orlando Predators in 1998, and the Fargo Freeze in 1999.

== Personal life ==
Dewitt and his wife, Lisa, have three children. His two daughters are Maya and Kira, and his son is Jovan, Jr.

Dewitt graduated from Northern Michigan as a dual-major in mathematics and physics. He turned down a job to work for NASA following graduation to enter the coaching profession.
