= Braxton Burmeister =

American football player (born 1998)

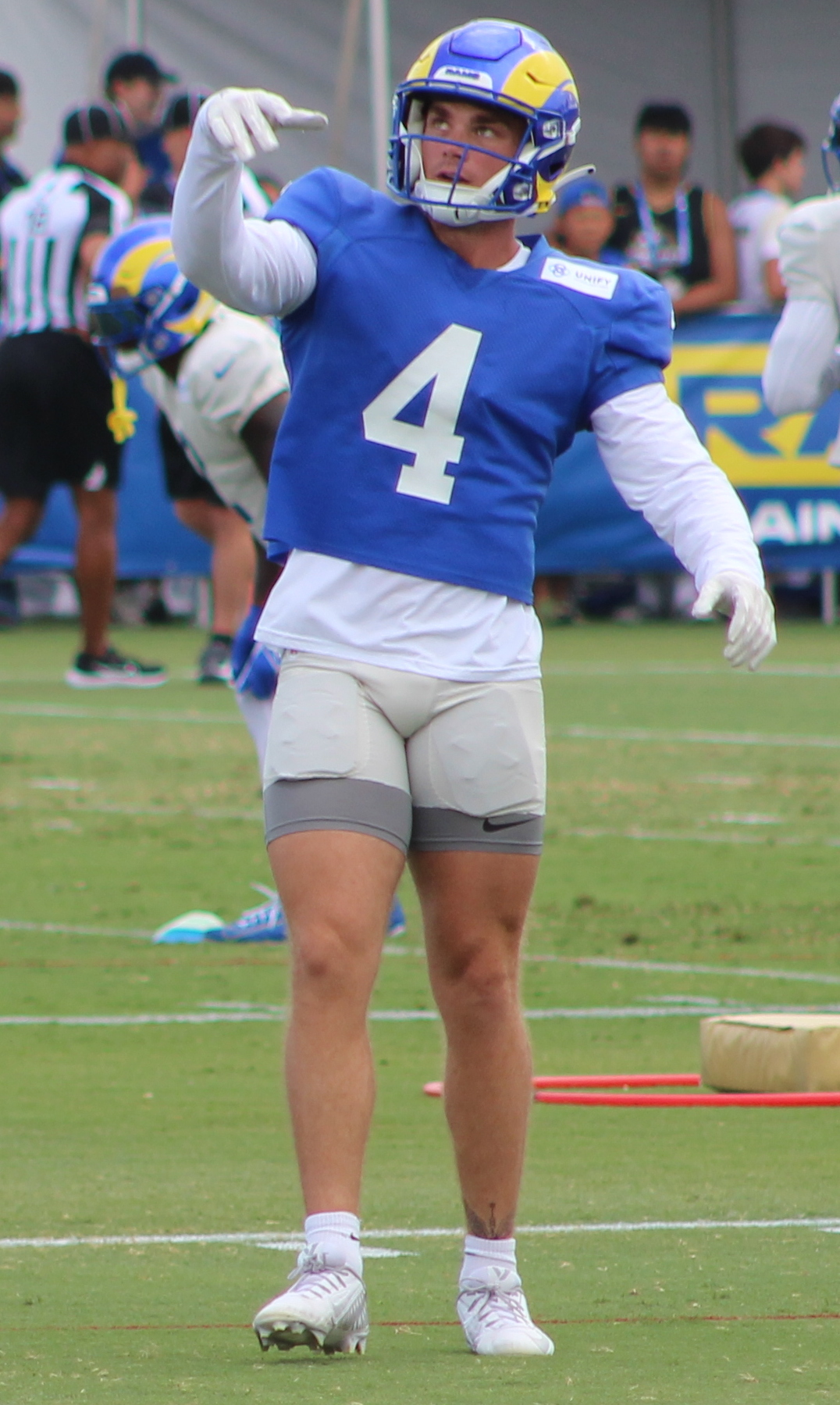
- Burmeister with the Los Angeles Rams in 2023

Profile
- Positions: Quarterback, wide receiver

Personal information
- Born: September 19, 1998 (age 28)
- Listed height: 6 ft 1 in (1.85 m)
- Listed weight: 205 lb (93 kg)

Career information
- High school: La Jolla Country Day (La Jolla, California)
- College: Oregon (2017–2018); Virginia Tech (2019–2021); San Diego State (2022)
- NFL draft: 2023: undrafted

Career history
- Los Angeles Rams (2023)*; Winnipeg Blue Bombers (2024)*
- * Offseason or practice squad member only

Braxton Burmeister (born September 19, 1998) is an American football coach and former American football quarterback and wide receiver. He played college football for the Oregon Ducks, Virginia Tech Hokies, and San Diego State Aztecs.

== Early life ==
Burmeister attended La Jolla Country Day School in La Jolla, California. As a junior, he threw for 2,771 yards and 31 touchdowns while also rushing for 868 yards and 20 touchdowns. As a senior, Burmeister recorded 5,931 total yards and 80 touchdowns. He finished his high school career throwing for 11,512 yards and 127 touchdowns while rushing for 3,459 yards and 68 touchdowns. A four-star recruit, Burmeister flipped his commitment to play college football from Arizona to the University of Oregon.

== College career ==
Burmeister entered his freshman season as the backup to Justin Herbert. Following an injury to Herbert, Burmeister was named the Duck's starting quarterback. In his first career start against Washington State, he completed 15 passes for 145 yards with a touchdown and two interceptions. Burmeister made five starts as a freshman, throwing for 330 yards, two touchdowns, and six interceptions. After playing sparingly the following season, he entered the transfer portal.

In February 2019, Burmeister announced his decision to transfer to Virginia Polytechnic Institute and State University to play for the Virginia Tech Hokies. He was ruled ineligible to play in the 2019 season, taking a redshirt. In 2020, Burmeister made four starts, throwing for 687 yards, two touchdowns, and an interception. He entered the 2021 season as the Hokie's starting quarterback. In 12 starts, Burmeister tallied 1,960 passing yards with 14 touchdowns and four interceptions, while also rushing for 521 yards and two touchdowns. Following the season, he entered the transfer portal for a second time.

In January 2022, Burmeister announced his decision to transfer to San Diego State University to play for the San Diego State Aztecs. He was named the Aztec's starting quarterback for the season opener against Arizona. He finished his final season of college football throwing for 263 yards, two touchdowns, and three interceptions.

=== Statistics ===
Season	Team	Games			Passing								Rushing			
Season	Team	GP	GS	Record	Cmp	Att	Pct	Yds	Avg	TD	Int	Rtg	Att	Yds	Avg	TD
2017	Oregon	7	5	1–4	44	77	57.1	330	4.3	2	6	86.1	64	102	1.6	3
2018	Oregon	4	0	0–0	5	10	50.0	43	4.3	0	0	86.1	7	29	4.1	0
2019	Virginia Tech	Redshirted (redshirt)														
2020	Virginia Tech	6	4	3–1	48	84	57.1	687	8.2	2	1	131.3	46	182	4.0	2
2021	Virginia Tech	12	12	6–6	142	255	55.7	1,960	7.7	14	4	135.2	116	508	4.4	2
2022	San Diego State	9	5	2–3	36	72	50.0	263	3.7	2	3	81.5	39	183	4.7	1
Career		38	26	12−14	275	498	55.2	3,283	6.6	20	14	118.2	272	1,004	3.7	8

== Professional career ==
=== Los Angeles Rams ===
After going undrafted in the 2023 NFL draft, Burmeister signed with the Los Angeles Rams as an undrafted free agent. Upon signing, he switched positions to wide receiver. On August 28, 2023, Burmeister was waived by the Rams.

=== Winnipeg Blue Bombers ===
On January 23, 2024, Burmeister signed with the Winnipeg Blue Bombers of the Canadian Football League. He was transferred to the suspended list on May 12.
