= John Copenhaver (American football) =

American football player (born 2001)

No. 43 – Jacksonville Jaguars
- Position: Tight end
- Roster status: Practice squad

Personal information
- Born: July 4, 2001 (age 25); Roswell, Georgia, U.S.
- Listed height: 6 ft 3 in (1.91 m)
- Listed weight: 240 lb (109 kg)

Career information
- High school: Roswell (Roswell, Georgia)
- College: North Carolina
- NFL draft: 2025: undrafted

Career history
- Jacksonville Jaguars (2025–present)

John Copenhaver (born July 4, 2001) is an American professional football tight end for the Jacksonville Jaguars of the National Football League (NFL). He played college football for the North Carolina Tar Heels.

== Early life ==
Copenhaver was born on July 4, 2001 in Roswell, Georgia to Stephanie and Bob Copenhaver. While in high school, he played both tight end and wide receiver positions for the Roswell Hornets team. He was rated a three-star recruiting prospect by 247Sports.com and received 16 athletic scholarship offers.

== College career ==
Copenhaver committed to the University of North Carolina and joined the Tar Heels as a tight end. He began his true freshman season in 2020 as a reservist before taking the field in the NC State, Western Carolina and Miami games. He remained in reserve during the 2021 season in which he played as a redshirt freshman. Despite these conditions, Copenhaver played 11 games during which he recorded 2 receptions for 9 yards and 1 touchdown. During the 2022 season, Copenhaver started his first game and recorded 12 catches by the end of the season. In the 2023 season, Copenhaver started 10 of 12 games, recording 18 receptions for 240 yards and 4 touchdowns. Entering his final season in 2024, Copenhaver's established performance earned him a place on the watch list for the Mackey Award. During the course of the 2024 season, Copenhaver sustained an injury to his right shoulder and a stress fracture in his right foot. After undergoing dedicated rehabilitation, Copenhaver finished his last season posting double-digit passing and reception yards in the seven total games he played. He finished his final Tar Heels season recording three touchdowns.

== Professional career ==
It was reported on April 27, 2025, Copenhaver was signed to a three-year contract with the Jacksonville Jaguars as an undrafted free agent. He was waived on August 26 as part of final roster cuts.
