= Wes Durham =

American sportscaster (born 1966)

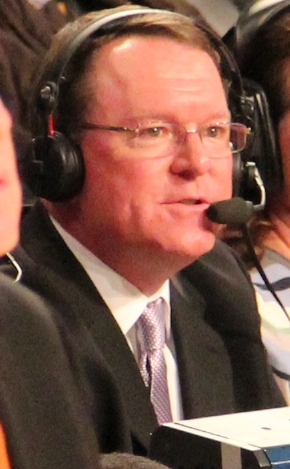
Durham in 2014

Dallas Wesley Durham (born January 25, 1966, in Greensboro, North Carolina) is an American sportscaster. He is a play-by-play announcer for ESPN and ACC Network coverage of college football and basketball.

Durham served as the radio play-by-play announcer for the Georgia Tech football and men's basketball teams from the start of the 1995-1996 season through 2010, and continued to announce the basketball games through 2013. He was also Georgia Tech's Director of Broadcasting and is the radio play-by-play announcer for the Atlanta Falcons.

== Biography ==
=== Early life ===
Durham's father, Woody Durham, was the "Voice of the Tar Heels" for the University of North Carolina at Chapel Hill for forty years. Growing up in that environment gave Wes the opportunity to see behind the scenes of sports and sports broadcasting.

Wes worked as a disc jockey for a roller rink and for a radio station during high school. Wes Durham attended Apex High School. He then went to Elon College and learned about broadcasting while working as an undergraduate assistant on the Elon Sports Network and local radio station WBAG. After graduating in 1988, he had stints as the radio announcer for the athletic teams at Marshall University and Radford University. He then spent three years at Vanderbilt University.

=== Georgia Tech ===
Durham came to Georgia Tech in the fall of 1995. In 1997, he was also named Tech's Director of Broadcasting. Durham was paired with former Tech QB Kim King until King died in 2003. Later on Durham worked with Jeff Van Note and Rick Strom during the remainder of his time at GT. Durham was known for making exciting calls while having a lot of charisma. Notable calls were the 1998 and 1999 thrillers between Tech and the Georgia Bulldogs, Calvin Johnson's game winning catch at Clemson in 2004, Will Bynums game winning layup in the Final Four in 2004, and Nesbitt taking back his own fumble against Florida State in 2009. After Durham left his role at Georgia Tech in 2013, his duties were taken over by Brandon Gaudin.

== Broadcasting ==
=== Play-by-play ===
Beginning with the 2004 NFL season, Durham also took on the radio play-by-play duties for the Atlanta Falcons in addition to his responsibilities at Georgia Tech. In 2011, when Raycom Sports began producing ACC college football games to air on Fox Sports Net (under a sub-license from ESPN), Durham was called upon to be the play-by-play announcer due to his long history working in the ACC. He was teamed with analyst James Bates. During his time at Elon, Wes interned at local radio station WBAB in Burlington NC where he was on the broadcast team announcing for WM Williams Bulldogs football.

=== Radio host ===
In 2018, Durham began hosting ACC This Morning on SiriusXM ACC Radio, with co-host Mark Packer. In March 2019, it was announced that the duo would host a similar program in simulcast with SiriusXM and ESPN's new ACC Network, Packer and Durham.
