= Brian Johnson (kicker) =

American football player (born 1999)

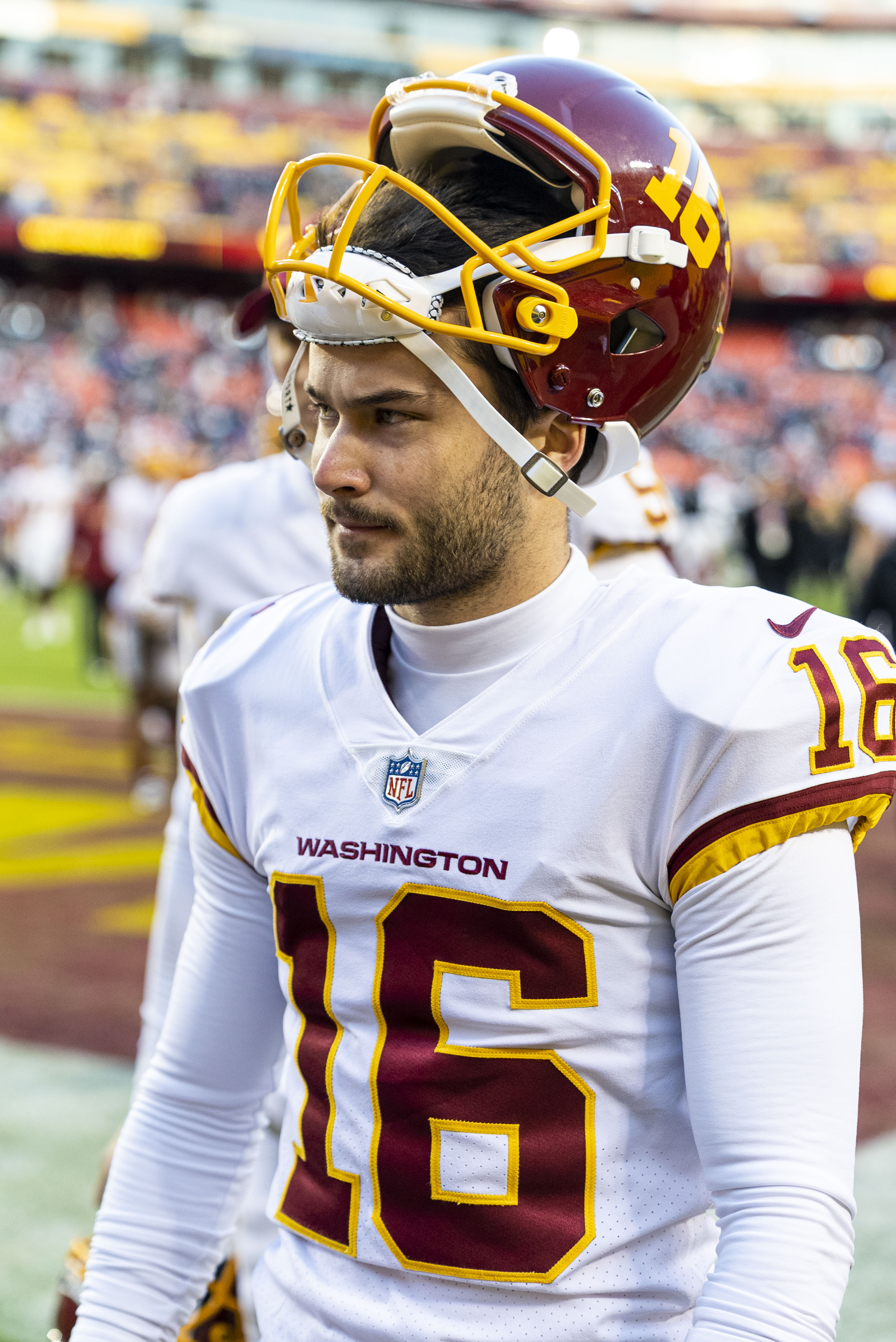
- Johnson with the Washington Football Team in 2021

No. 6, 16
- Position: Placekicker

Personal information
- Born: March 5, 1999 (age 27); Washington, D.C., U.S.
- Listed height: 6 ft 1 in (1.85 m)
- Listed weight: 185 lb (84 kg)

Career information
- High school: Gonzaga (Washington, D.C.)
- College: Virginia Tech (2016–2020)
- NFL draft: 2021: undrafted

Career history
- Chicago Bears (2021)*; New Orleans Saints (2021); Chicago Bears (2021)*; Washington Football Team (2021)
- * Offseason or practice squad member only

Awards and highlights
- NFL record: Most field goals made without a miss in a career: 10

Career NFL statistics
- Field goals: 10
- Field goals attempted: 10
- Field goal %: 100
- Longest field goal: 52
- Touchbacks: 16
- Stats at Pro Football Reference

Brian Johnson (born March 5, 1999) is an American former professional football player who was a placekicker in the National Football League (NFL). He played college football for the Virginia Tech Hokies and signed with the Chicago Bears as an undrafted free agent in 2021. Johnson was also a member of the New Orleans Saints and Washington Football Team. He holds the NFL record for most field goals made without missing, at 10.

== College career ==
Johnson was a member of the Virginia Tech Hokies for five seasons, redshirting as a true freshman. He finished his collegiate career with 54 field goals on 71 attempts (76.1%) and all 131 of extra points he attempted.

== Professional career ==
=== Chicago Bears ===
Johnson was signed by the Chicago Bears as an undrafted free agent on May 13, 2021. He was waived on August 31, during final roster cuts and was re-signed to the team's practice squad the following day.

=== New Orleans Saints ===
Johnson was signed by the New Orleans Saints off the Bears' practice squad on October 12, 2021. He made his professional debut on October 25, against the Seattle Seahawks on Monday Night Football and made a field goal with 1:56 left in the fourth quarter to put the Saints ahead in a 13–10 win. Johnson was waived by New Orleans on November 19.

=== Chicago Bears (second stint) ===
On November 23, 2021, Johnson signed with the Chicago Bears' practice squad.

=== Washington Football Team / Commanders ===
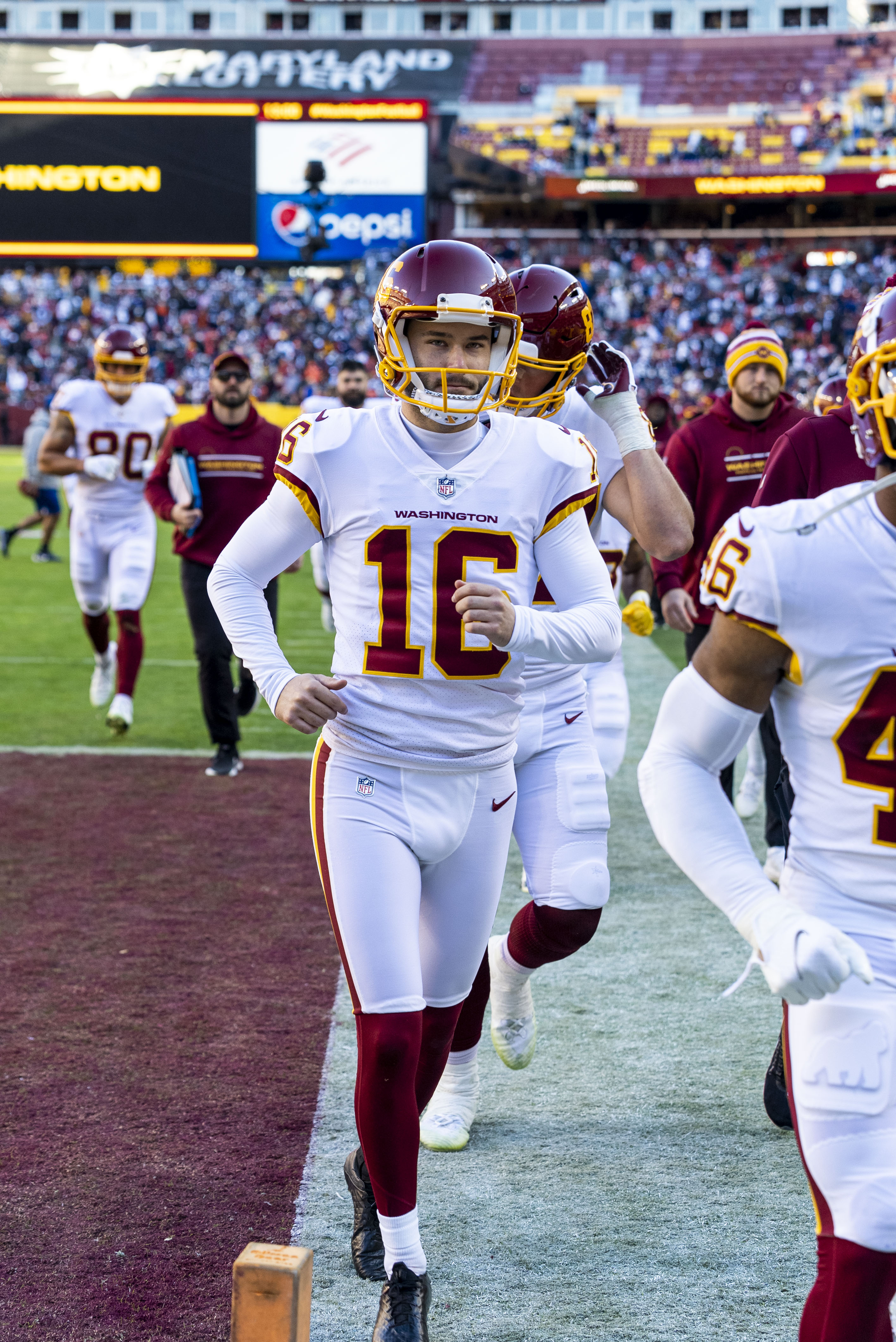
Johnson with the Football Team in 2021

Johnson signed with the Washington Football Team on November 30, 2021, after former Virginia Tech teammate, Joey Slye, was placed on injured reserve. In his first game with the team, Johnson made a game-winning 48-yard field goal in a 17–15 victory over the Las Vegas Raiders. Johnson played in three games before Slye returned and resumed duties as the starting kicker. The team placed an exclusive-rights free agent tender on Johnson on March 16, 2022, which went unsigned before he was released on June 13.

On August 27, 2022, the Carolina Panthers hosted Johnson for a workout.

As of 2025, Johnson holds the NFL record for most made field goals in a career without a miss with 10.
