= Dazz Newsome =

American football player (born 1999)

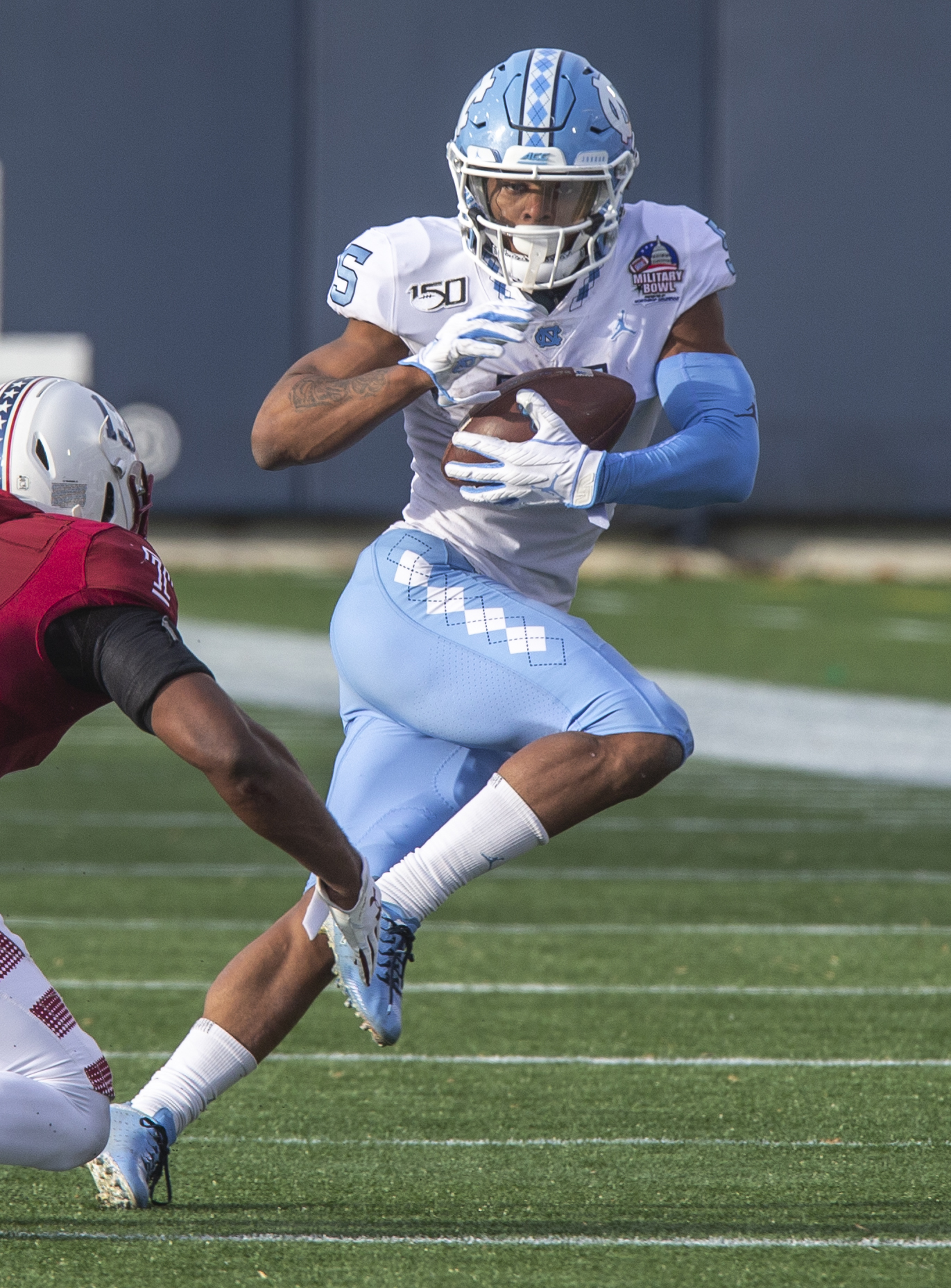
- Newsome with the North Carolina Tar Heels in 2019

Profile
- Position: Wide receiver

Personal information
- Born: May 15, 1999 (age 27); Hampton, Virginia, U.S.
- Listed height: 5 ft 10 in (1.78 m)
- Listed weight: 184 lb (83 kg)

Career information
- High school: Hampton
- College: North Carolina (2017–2020)
- NFL draft: 2021: 6th round, 221st overall pick

Career history
- Chicago Bears (2021); Kansas City Chiefs (2022)*; San Francisco 49ers (2022–2023)*; Saskatchewan Roughriders (2024)*
- * Offseason or practice squad member only

Awards and highlights
- Second-team All-ACC (2019)

Career NFL statistics
- Receptions: 2
- Receiving yards: 23
- Receiving touchdowns: 0
- Stats at Pro Football Reference

Dazz Newsome (born May 15, 1999) is an American professional football wide receiver. He played college football at North Carolina and was selected by the Chicago Bears in the sixth round of the 2021 NFL draft.

== Early life ==
Newsome attended Hampton High School in Hampton, Virginia. He played wide receiver, running back and cornerback in high school. As a senior he was the Daily Press Offensive Player of the Year after he had 35 total touchdowns, 1,684 rushing yards and 413 receiving yards. He originally committed to the University of Maryland, College Park to play college football but later changed to the University of North Carolina at Chapel Hill.

== College career ==
Newsome originally started his career at North Carolina in 2017 as a defensive back but was converted to wide receiver. He finished his first season with 18 receptions for 227 yards in nine games. As a sophomore in 2018, he played in 11 games with six starts and had 44 receptions for 506 yards and two receiving touchdowns and a punt return touchdown. As a junior in 2019, Newsome led the team with 72 receptions for 1,018 yards and 10 touchdowns. In his senior year, the COVID-19 affected 2020 season, Newsome caught 54 passes for 684 yards and 6 touchdowns. He entered the NFL draft following the season, electing not to use the extra year of eligibility that had been granted to NCAA athletes in response to the pandemic.

== Professional career ==
Pre-draft measurables
Height	Weight	Arm length	Hand span	40-yard dash	10-yard split	20-yard split	20-yard shuttle	Three-cone drill	Vertical jump	Broad jump	Bench press
5 ft 10 1/8 in (1.78 m)	190 lb (86 kg)	29 7/8 in (0.76 m)	9 in (0.23 m)	4.57 s	1.65 s	2.66 s	4.39 s	7.39 s	34.0 in (0.86 m)	10 ft 1 in (3.07 m)	12 reps
All values from Pro Day

=== Chicago Bears ===
Newsome was selected by the Chicago Bears in the 6th round, 221st overall, of the 2021 NFL draft. On June 2, 2021, Newsome suffered a broken collarbone. The same day, he signed his four-year rookie contract with Chicago. On August 31, Newsome was waived by the Bears. The following day, Newsome was added to Chicago's practice squad. He was promoted to the active roster on January 8, 2022.

On August 23, 2022, Newsome was waived by the Bears.

=== Kansas City Chiefs ===
On November 1, 2022, the Kansas City Chiefs signed Newsome to their practice squad. He was released just two days later.

=== San Francisco 49ers ===
On November 14, 2022, the San Francisco 49ers hosted Newsome for a workout. He was signed to the team's practice squad the following day. He signed a reserve/future contract with Kansas City on January 31, 2023. Newsome was waived by the Chiefs on August 22.

=== Saskatchewan Roughriders ===
On February 27, 2024, Newsome agreed to terms with the Saskatchewan Roughriders of the Canadian Football League. He was placed on the reserve/suspended list by Saskatchewan on May 12.
