= 2020 Clemson Tigers football team =

American college football season

2020 Clemson Tigers football

ACC champion

ACC Championship Game, W 34–10 vs. Notre Dame

Sugar Bowl (CFP semifinal), L 28–49 vs. Ohio State
- Conference: Atlantic Coast Conference

Ranking
- Coaches: No. 3
- AP: No. 3
- Record: 10–2 (8–1 ACC)
- Head coach: Dabo Swinney (12th full, 13th overall season)
- Offensive coordinator: Tony Elliott (6th season)
- Offensive scheme: Spread
- Defensive coordinator: Brent Venables (9th season)
- Base defense: 4–3
- Home stadium: Memorial Stadium

Uniform
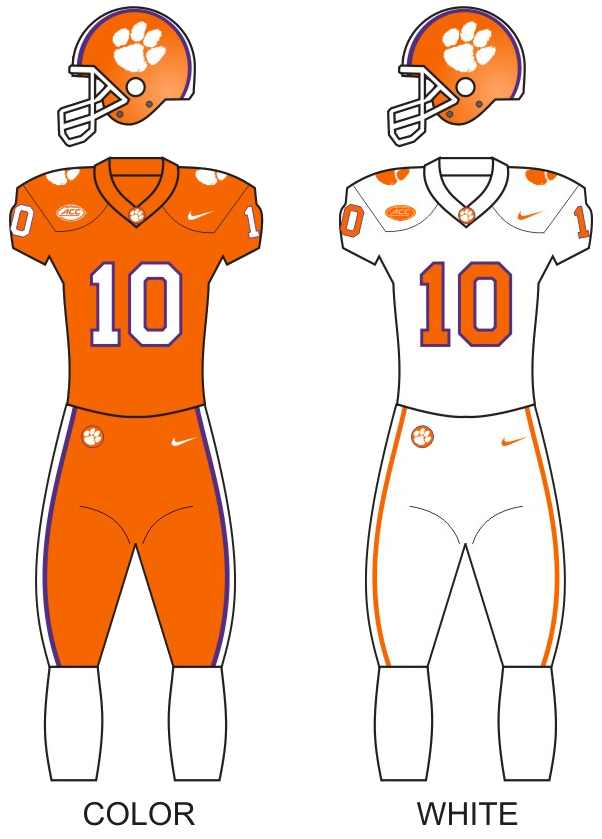

2020 Atlantic Coast Conference football standings
| | Conf. | | | Overall |
| Team | W | | L | W | | L |
|---|---|---|---|---|---|---|
| No. 5 Notre Dame y^ | 9 | – | 0 | 10 | – | 2 |
| No. 3 Clemson y$^ | 8 | – | 1 | 10 | – | 2 |
| No. 22 Miami (FL) | 7 | – | 2 | 8 | – | 3 |
| No. 18 North Carolina | 7 | – | 3 | 8 | – | 4 |
| NC State | 7 | – | 3 | 8 | – | 4 |
| Boston College | 5 | – | 5 | 6 | – | 5 |
| Pittsburgh | 5 | – | 5 | 6 | – | 5 |
| Virginia Tech | 5 | – | 5 | 5 | – | 6 |
| Virginia | 4 | – | 5 | 5 | – | 5 |
| Wake Forest | 3 | – | 4 | 4 | – | 5 |
| Georgia Tech | 3 | – | 6 | 3 | – | 7 |
| Louisville | 3 | – | 7 | 4 | – | 7 |
| Florida State | 2 | – | 6 | 3 | – | 6 |
| Duke | 1 | – | 9 | 2 | – | 9 |
| Syracuse | 1 | – | 9 | 1 | – | 10 |
Championship: Clemson 34, Notre Dame 10
^ – College Football Playoff participant; $ – Conference champion; y – Championship game participant; Rankings from AP Poll.

The 2020 Clemson Tigers football team represented Clemson University during the 2020 NCAA Division I FBS football season. The Tigers were led by head coach Dabo Swinney, in his 12th full year. The Tigers competed as a member of the Atlantic Coast Conference (ACC) and played their home games at Memorial Stadium in Clemson, South Carolina.

The season was played amidst the ongoing COVID-19 pandemic. The ACC settled on an eleven-game football schedule, with ten conference games with no divisions and one non-conference game. Clemson canceled their previously scheduled non-conference games against Akron and South Carolina, and kept their game against The Citadel. Precautions were taken to reduce the spread of the virus, including testing, isolation requirements, and limitations on the number of fans in attendance.

Clemson began the year ranked first in the preseason AP Poll, and handily won their first seven games of the season, including a 42–17 win over then-No. 9 Miami (FL). Starting quarterback Trevor Lawrence tested positive for COVID-19 on October 29, and was forced to miss the team's next two games against Boston College and temporary ACC member Notre Dame. The team escaped with a close win against Boston College, but lost on the road to then-No. 4 Notre Dame in double overtime, 47–40. Clemson won the remainder of their regular season games, and earned a place in the ACC Championship Game by finishing second in the division-less format with an 8–1 record, behind Notre Dame. In the rematch against the Fighting Irish, this time with Lawrence at quarterback, the Tigers were victorious by a score of 34–10, to win their sixth consecutive ACC title. In the final College Football Playoff rankings of the season, Clemson was ranked second, earning them a place in the national semifinal to be played at the Sugar Bowl against third-seeded Ohio State, a rematch of the previous season's Fiesta Bowl. Clemson lost the rematch, 49–28, to end the season at 10–2 and ranked third in the final polls.

Junior quarterback Trevor Lawrence led the team on offense with 3,153 passing yards and 24 passing touchdowns. He was named ACC Player of the Year and finished second in voting for the Heisman Trophy. The team's leading rusher was Travis Etienne, who was named a consensus All-American all-purpose back. Amari Rodgers was the team's leading receiver and was named first-team all-conference. On defense, the team featured two first-team all-conference members in lineman Bryan Bresee and cornerback Derion Kendrick. Bresee was named the ACC Defensive Freshman of the Year.

== Offseason ==
=== Recruiting ===
Clemson's 2020 recruiting class consisted of 23 signees. The class was ranked as the best class in the ACC and the third best class overall according to the 247Sports Composite.

College recruiting (2020)
| Name | Hometown | School | Height | Weight | Commit date |
|---|---|---|---|---|---|
| Ajou Ajou; WR | Clearwater, FL | Clearwater Academy International | 6 ft 4 in (1.93 m) | 200 lb (91 kg) | Jul 27, 2019 |
| Ajou Ajou; WR | Recruit ratings: Rivals: 247Sports: ESPN: (78) | | | | |
| Sergio Allen; ILB | Fort Valley, GA | Peach County | 6 ft 1 in (1.85 m) | 217 lb (98 kg) | Jul 26, 2018 |
| Sergio Allen; ILB | Recruit ratings: Rivals: 247Sports: ESPN: (83) | | | | |
| DeMarkus Bowman; RB | Lakeland, FL | Lakeland | 5 ft 10 in (1.78 m) | 190 lb (86 kg) | May 3, 2019 |
| DeMarkus Bowman; RB | Recruit ratings: Rivals: 247Sports: ESPN: (87) | | | | |
| Bryan Bresee; DT | Damascus, MD | Damascus | 6 ft 5 in (1.96 m) | 290 lb (130 kg) | Dec 18, 2019 |
| Bryan Bresee; DT | Recruit ratings: Rivals: 247Sports: ESPN: (92) | | | | |
| DeMonte Capehart; DT | Bradenton, FL | IMG Academy | 6 ft 5 in (1.96 m) | 290 lb (130 kg) | Jun 5, 2018 |
| DeMonte Capehart; DT | Recruit ratings: Rivals: 247Sports: ESPN: (86) | | | | |
| Fred Davis II; CB | Jacksonville, FL | Trinity Christian | 6 ft 1 in (1.85 m) | 185 lb (84 kg) | Apr 8, 2019 |
| Fred Davis II; CB | Recruit ratings: Rivals: 247Sports: ESPN: (84) | | | | |
| Sage Ennis; TE | Tallahassee, FL | Lincoln | 6 ft 4 in (1.93 m) | 220 lb (100 kg) | Jun 17, 2019 |
| Sage Ennis; TE | Recruit ratings: Rivals: 247Sports: ESPN: (79) | | | | |
| Malcolm Greene; S | Highland Springs, VA | Highland Springs | 5 ft 10 in (1.78 m) | 180 lb (82 kg) | Dec 18, 2019 |
| Malcolm Greene; S | Recruit ratings: Rivals: 247Sports: ESPN: (80) | | | | |
| Trent Howard; OG | Birmingham, AL | Briarwood Christian | 6 ft 3 in (1.91 m) | 260 lb (120 kg) | Dec 6, 2019 |
| Trent Howard; OG | Recruit ratings: Rivals: 247Sports: ESPN: (3) | | | | |
| Mitchell Mayes; OG | Raleigh, NC | Leesville Road | 6 ft 4 in (1.93 m) | 315 lb (143 kg) | Mar 11, 2019 |
| Mitchell Mayes; OG | Recruit ratings: Rivals: 247Sports: ESPN: (86) | | | | |
| R.J. Mickens; CB | Southlake, TX | Carroll | 6 ft 0 in (1.83 m) | 190 lb (86 kg) | Apr 6, 2019 |
| R.J. Mickens; CB | Recruit ratings: Rivals: 247Sports: ESPN: (82) | | | | |
| Myles Murphy; DE | Powder Springs, GA | Hillgrove | 6 ft 5 in (1.96 m) | 271 lb (123 kg) | May 17, 2019 |
| Myles Murphy; DE | Recruit ratings: Rivals: 247Sports: ESPN: (90) | | | | |
| Walker Parks; OT | Lexington, KY | Frederick Douglass | 6 ft 5 in (1.96 m) | 275 lb (125 kg) | Oct 21, 2018 |
| Walker Parks; OT | Recruit ratings: Rivals: 247Sports: ESPN: (84) | | | | |
| Kobe Pryor; RB | Cedartown, GA | Cedartown | 6 ft 0 in (1.83 m) | 195 lb (88 kg) | May 18, 2019 |
| Kobe Pryor; RB | Recruit ratings: Rivals: 247Sports: ESPN: (80) | | | | |
| Trenton Simpson; OLB | Charlotte, NC | Mallard Creek | 6 ft 3 in (1.91 m) | 225 lb (102 kg) | Dec 14, 2019 |
| Trenton Simpson; OLB | Recruit ratings: Rivals: 247Sports: ESPN: (84) | | | | |
| Kevin Swint; DE | Carrollton, GA | Carrollton | 6 ft 3 in (1.91 m) | 245 lb (111 kg) | Jan 26, 2019 |
| Kevin Swint; DE | Recruit ratings: Rivals: 247Sports: ESPN: (83) | | | | |
| Paul Tchio; OG | Alpharetta, GA | Milton | 6 ft 5 in (1.96 m) | 334 lb (151 kg) | Nov 25, 2018 |
| Paul Tchio; OG | Recruit ratings: Rivals: 247Sports: ESPN: (83) | | | | |
| Bryn Tucker; OG | Knoxville, TN | Knoxville Catholic | 6 ft 5 in (1.96 m) | 292 lb (132 kg) | Mar 14, 2019 |
| Bryn Tucker; OG | Recruit ratings: Rivals: 247Sports: ESPN: (83) | | | | |
| DJ Uiagalelei; QB | Bellflower, CA | St. John Bosco | 6 ft 5 in (1.96 m) | 243 lb (110 kg) | May 5, 2019 |
| DJ Uiagalelei; QB | Recruit ratings: Rivals: 247Sports: ESPN: (86) | | | | |
| Tyler Venables; S | Central, SC | D. W. Daniel | 5 ft 10 in (1.78 m) | 185 lb (84 kg) | Jun 2, 2019 |
| Tyler Venables; S | Recruit ratings: Rivals: 247Sports: ESPN: (75) | | | | |
| EJ Williams; WR | Phenix City, AL | Central | 6 ft 2 in (1.88 m) | 185 lb (84 kg) | Aug 24, 2019 |
| EJ Williams; WR | Recruit ratings: Rivals: 247Sports: ESPN: (84) | | | | |
| John Williams; OT | Canton, GA | Creekview | 6 ft 4 in (1.93 m) | 270 lb (120 kg) | Sep 1, 2018 |
| John Williams; OT | Recruit ratings: Rivals: 247Sports: ESPN: (80) | | | | |
| Tre Williams; DT | Washington, D.C. | St. John's College | 6 ft 3 in (1.91 m) | 308 lb (140 kg) | Jan 26, 2019 |
| Tre Williams; DT | Recruit ratings: Rivals: 247Sports: ESPN: (86) | | | | |
Overall recruit ranking: Rivals: 2 247Sports: 3 ESPN: 1
Note: In many cases, Scout, Rivals, 247Sports, On3, and ESPN may conflict in their listings of height and weight.; In these cases, the average was taken. ESPN grades are on a 100-point scale.; Sources: "Rivals commits". Rivals.; "ESPN commits". ESPN.; "2020 Team Ranking". Rivals.com.; "247Sports commits". 247Sports.

=== Offseason departures ===
==== NFL draftees ====
| Player | Round | Pick | Team | Position |
|---|---|---|---|---|
| Isaiah Simmons | 1 | 8 | Arizona Cardinals | LB |
| A. J. Terrell | 1 | 16 | Atlanta Falcons | CB |
| Tee Higgins | 2 | 33 | Cincinnati Bengals | WR |
| Tanner Muse | 3 | 100 | Las Vegas Raiders | ILB |
| John Simpson | 4 | 109 | Las Vegas Raiders | G |
| K'Von Wallace | 4 | 127 | Philadelphia Eagles | S |
| Tremayne Anchrum | 7 | 250 | Los Angeles Rams | G |

==== Undrafted free agents ====
| Player | Team | Position | Reference |
|---|---|---|---|
| Sean Pollard | Baltimore Ravens | OL | |

==== Transfers ====
| Name | Number | Pos. | Height | Weight | Year | Hometown | College transferred to | Source(s) |
|---|---|---|---|---|---|---|---|---|
| Demarkcus Bowman | 1 | RB | 5'10" | 190 | Freshman | Lakeland, FL | Florida | |
| Chase Brice | 7 | QB | 6'2" | 207 | (redshirt) Sophomore | Loganville, GA | Duke | |
| T. J. Chase | 18 | WR | 6'1" | 185 | (redshirt) Junior | Plant City, FL | FAU | |
| Xavier Kelly | 22 | DE | 6'4" | 265 | (redshirt) Junior | Wichita, KS | Arkansas | |
| Johnathan Boyd | 46 | LB | 6'2" | 217 | (redshirt) Sophomore | Lilburn, GA | Delta State | |

== Preseason ==
=== Award watch lists ===
Listed in the order that they were released

| Award | Player | Position | Year |
|---|---|---|---|
| Lott Trophy | Justin Foster | DE | SR |
| Doak Walker Award | Travis Etienne | RB | SR |
| Davey O'Brien Award | Trevor Lawrence | QB | JR |
| Butkus Award | James Skalski | LB | SR |
| Jim Thorpe Award | Derion Kendrick | CB | JR |
| Bronko Nagurski Trophy | James Skalski | LB | SR |
| Bronko Nagurski Trophy | Tyler Davis | DT | SO |
| Outland Trophy | Jackson Carman | OL | JR |
| Outland Trophy | Tyler Davis | DT | SO |
| Paul Hornung Award | Amari Rodgers | WR | SR |
| Wuerffel Trophy | Darien Rencher | RB | SR |
| Maxwell Award | Trevor Lawrence | QB | JR |
| Maxwell Award | Travis Etienne | RB | SR |
| Manning Award | Trevor Lawrence | QB | JR |

== Schedule ==
Clemson had games scheduled against Akron and South Carolina, which were both canceled due to the COVID-19 pandemic. This was the first season since 1908 that the Tigers did not play South Carolina.

The ACC released their schedule format on July 29, with specific dates selected at a later date. Specific game dates were released on August 6, 2020. Florida State cancelled their scheduled game with Clemson the morning of the game after Clemson had already traveled to Florida State's campus.

| Date | Time | Opponent | Rank | Site | TV | Result | Attendance |
|---|---|---|---|---|---|---|---|
| September 12 | 7:30 p.m. | at Wake Forest | No. 1 | Truist Field at Wake Forest; Winston-Salem, NC (College GameDay) | ABC | W 37–13 | 68 |
| September 19 | 4:00 p.m. | The Citadel* | No. 1 | Memorial Stadium; Clemson, SC | ACCN | W 49–0 | 18,609 |
| October 3 | 8:00 p.m. | Virginia | No. 1 | Memorial Stadium; Clemson, SC | ACCN | W 41–23 | 18,735 |
| October 10 | 7:30 p.m. | No. 7 Miami (FL) | No. 1 | Memorial Stadium; Clemson, SC (College GameDay) | ABC | W 42–17 | 18,885 |
| October 17 | 12:00 p.m. | at Georgia Tech | No. 1 | Bobby Dodd Stadium; Atlanta, GA (rivalry) | ABC | W 73–7 | 11,000 |
| October 24 | 12:00 p.m. | Syracuse | No. 1 | Memorial Stadium; Clemson, SC | ACCN | W 47–21 | 18,629 |
| October 31 | 12:00 p.m. | Boston College | No. 1 | Memorial Stadium; Clemson, SC (O'Rourke–McFadden Trophy) | ABC | W 34–28 | 18,690 |
| November 7 | 7:30 p.m. | at No. 4 Notre Dame | No. 1 | Notre Dame Stadium; South Bend, IN (College GameDay) | NBC/USA | L 40–47 ^{2OT} | 11,011 |
| November 28 | 3:30 p.m. | Pittsburgh | No. 3 | Memorial Stadium; Clemson, SC | ABC | W 52–17 | 18,819 |
| December 5 | 7:30 p.m. | at Virginia Tech | No. 3 | Lane Stadium; Blacksburg, VA | ABC | W 45–10 | 250 |
| December 19 | 4:00 p.m. | vs. No. 2 Notre Dame | No. 3 | Bank of America Stadium; Charlotte, NC (ACC Championship Game/College GameDay) | ABC | W 34–10 | 5,240 |
| January 1, 2021 | 8:00 p.m. | vs. No. 3 Ohio State* | No. 2 | Mercedes-Benz Superdome; New Orleans, LA (Sugar Bowl – CFP Semifinal) | ESPN | L 28–49 | 3,000 |
*Non-conference game; Rankings from AP Poll and CFP Rankings after November 24 released prior to game; All times are in Eastern time

== Rankings ==
Ranking movements Legend: ██ Increase in ranking ██ Decrease in ranking ( ) = First-place votes
| | Week | | | | | | | | | | | | | | | | | |
| Poll | Pre | 1 | 2 | 3 | 4 | 5 | 6 | 7 | 8 | 9 | 10 | 11 | 12 | 13 | 14 | 15 | 16 | Final |
|---|---|---|---|---|---|---|---|---|---|---|---|---|---|---|---|---|---|---|
| AP | 1 (38) | 1* | 1 (60) | 1 (59) | 1 (55) | 1 (52) | 1 (59) | 1 (54) | 1 (52) | 1 (33) | 4 | 4 | 4 | 4 | 4 | 4 | 2 | 3 |
| Coaches | 1 (38) | 1* | 1 (37) | 1 (44) | 1 (42) | 1 (46) | 1 (55) | 1 (52) | 1 (52) | 1 (43) | 4 | 4 | 4 | 3 | 3 | 3 | 2 | 3 |
| CFP | Not released | | | | | | | | | | | | 3 | 3 | 3 | 3 | 2 | Not released |

== Personnel ==
=== Coaching staff ===
Clemson Tigers football current coaching staff
| Name | Position | Alma mater | Years at Clemson |
|---|---|---|---|
| Dabo Swinney | Head coach | University of Alabama (1993) | 13th |
| Brent Venables | Associate head coach/defensive coordinator/linebackers Coach | Kansas State University (1992) | 8th |
| Danny Pearman | Assistant head coach, Special Teams Coordinator, Tight Ends | Clemson University (1987) | 11th |
| Tony Elliott | Offensive coordinator/running backs Coach | Clemson University (2002) | 5th |
| Brandon Streeter | Assistant coach, Passing Game Coordinator, Quarterbacks | Clemson University (1999) | 6th |
| Todd Bates | Assistant coach, Recruiting Coordinator, Defensive tackles | University of Alabama (2004) | 3rd |
| Robbie Caldwell | Assistant coach, Offensive Linemen | Furman University (1977) | 9th |
| Mickey Conn | Assistant coach, Safeties | University of Alabama (1995) | 5th |
| Tyler Grisham | Assistant coach, Wide Receivers | Clemson University (2009) | 1st |
| Lemanski Hall | Assistant coach, Defensive Ends | University of Alabama (1993) | 3rd |
| Mike Reed | Assistant coach, Cornerbacks | Boston College (1994) | 7th |

=== Roster ===
2020 Clemson Tigers Football
| Quarterback: 5 DJ Uiagalelei – freshman (6'4, 250); 7 Taisun Phommachanh – (redshirt) freshman (6'3, 220); 15 James Talton – freshman (6'0, 185); 16 Trevor Lawrence – junior (6'6, 220); 18 Hunter Helms – freshman (6'1, 210); Running back: 1 DeMarkcus Bowman – freshman (5'10, 190); 9 Travis Etienne – senior (5'10, 205); 14 Kobe Pace – freshman (5'10, 215); 19 Michel Dukes – sophomore (5'10, 205); 21 Darien Rencher – (redshirt) senior (5'8, 195); 23 Lyn-J Dixon – junior (5'10, 195); 27 Chez Mellusi – sophomore (5'11, 200); 32 Sylvester Mayers – (redshirt) junior (5'6, 150); 33 Ty Lucas – (redshirt) sophomore (5'7, 220); Wide receiver: 2 Frank Ladson Jr. – sophomore (6'3 205); 3 Amari Rodgers – senior (5'10, 210); 6 E.J. Williams Jr. – freshman (6'3, 190); 8 Justyn Ross – junior (6'4, 205); 10 Joseph Ngata – sophomore (6'3, 220); 11 Ajou Ajou – freshman (6'3, 215); 13 Brannon Specter – (redshirt) freshman (6'1, 190); 17 Cornell Powell – (redshirt) senior (6'0, 210); 22 Will Swinney – senior (5'9, 185); 24 Hamp Greene – (redshirt) freshman (5'9, 175); 45 Josh Jackson – (redshirt) senior (6'1, 200); 81 Drew Swinney – (redshirt) sophomore (5'8, 185); 82 Will Brown – (redshirt) junior (5'8, 190); 83 Hampton Earle – (redshirt) freshman (5'10, 185); 86 Tye Herbstreit – (redshirt) freshman (6'0, 175); 89 Max May – (redshirt) sophomore (6'1, 190); Tight end: 25 J.C. Chalk – (redshirt) senior (6'3, 255); 43 Will Blackston – freshman (6'1, 250); 80 Luke Price – (redshirt) junior (6'2, 235); 84 Davis Allen – sophomore (6'6, 250); 85 Jaelyn Lay – (redshirt) freshman (6'6, 270); 87 Sage Ennis – freshman (6'4, 235); 88 Braden Galloway – junior (6'4, 240); Placekicker: 29 B. T. Potter – junior (5'10, 180); 36 Quinn Castner – freshman (5'5, 140); 41 Jonathan Weitz – (redshirt) freshman (5'11, 190) | Offensive lineman: 50 Kaleb Boateng – OL – (redshirt) freshman (6'4, 315); 52 Tayquon Johnson – OG – (redshirt) freshman (6'2, 340); 54 Mason Trotter – OL – (redshirt) freshman (6'2, 280); 55 Hunter Rayburn – OL – (redshirt) freshman (6'4, 320); 56 Will Putnam – OL – sophomore (6'4, 300); 57 Paul Tchio – OL – freshman (6'5, 300); 60 Mac Cranford – OL – (redshirt) freshman (6'0, 290); 62 Cade Stewart – OL – (redshirt) Graduate (6'3, 305); 63 Zac McIntosh – OL – (redshirt) junior (5'11, 285); 64 Walker Parks – OL – freshman (6'5, 295); 65 Matt Bockhorst – OG – (redshirt) junior (6'4, 315); 67 Will Edwards – OT – (redshirt) sophomore (6'5, 275); 68 Will Boggs – OL – freshman (6'3, 290); 69 Jacob Edwards – OL – (redshirt) sophomore (6'2, 300); 71 Jordan McFadden – OT – (redshirt) sophomore (6'2, 300); 72 Blake Vinson – OL – (redshirt) sophomore (6'4, 300); 73 Bryn Tucker – OL – freshman (6'3, 314); 75 Trent Howard – OL – freshman (6'3, 314); 76 John Williams – OL – freshman (6'4, 300); 77 Mitchell Mayes – OL – freshman (6'3, 300); 79 Jackson Carman – OL – junior (6'5, 335); Defensive lineman: 3 Xavier Thomas – DE – junior (6'2, 270); 5 KJ Henry – DE – (redshirt) sophomore (6'4, 255); 7 Justin Mascoll – DE – (redshirt) sophomore (6'3, 255); 8 Tré Williams – DT – freshman (6'2, 300); 11 Bryan Bresee – DT – freshman (6'5, 300); 13 Tyler Davis – DL – sophomore (6'2, 300); 19 Demonte Capehart – DL – freshman (6'5, 305); 32 Etinosa Reuben – DT – (redshirt) freshman (6'3, 280); 33 Ruke Orhorhoro – DT – sophomore (6'5, 275); 34 Jack Brissey – DE – (redshirt) freshman (6'2, 225); 35 Justin Foster – DE – senior (6'2, 275); 40 Greg Williams – DE – (redshirt) Freshamn (6'4, 260); 44 Nyles Pinckney – DT – (redshirt) Graduate (6'1, 300); 53 Regan Upshaw – DE – (redshirt) Graduate (5'11, 240); 59 Jordan Williams – DT – (redshirt) junior (6'4, 310); 90 Darnell Jefferies – DT – (redshirt) sophomore (6'2, 290); 91 Nick Eddis – DT – (redshirt) junior (5'11, 270); 92 Klayton Randolph – DE – (redshirt) sophomore (6'2, 250); 95 James Edwards – DT – (redshirt) junior (6'2, 300); 98 Myles Murphy – DE – freshman (6'5, 275); Punter: 39 Aidan Swanson – (redshirt) freshman (6'3, 170); 48 Will Spiers – (redshirt) senior (6'5, 225) | Linebacker: 6 Mike Jones Jr. – (redshirt) sophomore (6'0, 220); 10 Baylon Spector – (redshirt) Graduate (6'2, 230); 14 Kevin Swint – freshman (6'3, 230); 15 Jake Venables – (redshirt) sophomore (6'2, 235); 17 Kane Patterson – sophomore (6'1, 225); 22 Trenton Simpson – freshman (6'3, 225); 30 Keith Maguire – (redshirt) freshman (6'2, 230); 42 LaVonta Bradley – (redshirt) freshman (6'0, 235); 45 Sergio Allen – freshman (6'1, 225); 46 Matt McMahan – (redshirt) freshman (6'0, 220); 47 James Skalski – (redshirt) Graduate (6'0, 240); 48 David Cote – (redshirt) freshman (5'11, 215); 49 Matt Maloney – (redshirt) freshman (6'0, 200); 53 Regan Upshaw – (redshirt) junior (5'11, 235); Defensive back: 1 Derion Kendrick – CB – junior (6'0, 190); 2 Fred Davis II – CB – freshman (6'0, 185); 9 R.J. Mickens – S – freshman (6'0, 200); 12 Tyler Venables – S – freshman (5'10, 200); 16 Ray Thornton III – DB – (redshirt) freshman (6'1, 205); 18 Joseph Charleston – S – sophomore (6'0, 190); 20 LeAnthony Williams Jr. – CB – (redshirt) junior (5'11, 185); 21 Malcolm Greene – CB – freshman (5'11, 190); 23 Andrew Booth Jr. – CB – sophomore (6'0, 195); 24 Nolan Turner – S – (redshirt) senior (6'1, 205); 25 Jalyn Phillips – DB – sophomore (6'1, 210); 26 Sheridan Jones – CB – sophomore (6'0, 185); 26 Jack McCall – CB – (redshirt) junior (5'11, 200); 27 Carson Donnelly – S – (redshirt) sophomore (5'10, 195); 29 Michael Becker – S – (redshirt) sophomore (6'0, 205); 31 Mario Goodrich – CB – junior (6'0, 190); 36 Landen Zanders – S – sophomore (6'1, 200); 37 Jake Herbstreit – S – (redshirt) freshman (5'11, 170); 38 Elijah Turner – S – (redshirt) Graduate (5'11, 190); 39 Bubba McAtee – S – freshman (6'2, 190); 47 Peter Cote – S – (redshirt) junior (5'9, 200); Long snappers: 46 Jack Maddox – (redshirt) junior (6'3, 235); 52 Tyler Brown – (redshirt) Graduate (6'0, 220); 58 Maddie Golden – (redshirt) sophomore (5'10, 220) |

== Game summaries ==
=== At Wake Forest ===
Clemson Tigers at Wake Forest Demon Deacons − Game summary

| Quarter | 1 | 2 | 3 | 4 | Total |
|---|---|---|---|---|---|
| No. 1 Clemson | 14 | 13 | 10 | 0 | 37 |
| Wake Forest | 0 | 0 | 3 | 10 | 13 |

at Truist Field at Wake Forest • Winston-Salem, NC

- Date: September 12, 2020
- Game time: 7:30 p.m.
- Game weather: Temperature: 74 °F (23 °C) • Wind: 2 mph (3.2 km/h) NE • Weather: Mostly Cloudy
- Game attendance: 68
- Referee: Riley Johnson
- TV announcers (ABC): Sean McDonough (play-by-play), Todd Blackledge (color), Todd McShay, & Allison Williams (sidelines)

Game information

First quarter

- 08:02 CLEM TD – Trevor Lawrence 2 yard run, (B. T. Potter PAT)
- 02:31 CLEM TD – Trevor Lawrence 1 yard run, (B. T. Potter PAT)

Second quarter

- 10:54 CLEM FG – B. T. Potter 42 yard FG
- 01:21 CLEM TD – Trevor Lawrence 12 yard pass to J. C. Chalk, (B. T. Potter PAT)
- 00:00 CLEM FG – B. T. Potter 52 yard FG

Third quarter

- 13:21 WAKE FG – Nick Sciba 39 yard FG
- 10:38 CLEM TD – Travis Etienne 2 yard run, (B. T. Potter PAT)
- 03:14 CLEM FG – B. T. Potter 29 yard FG

Fourth quarter

- 07:20 WAKE FG – Nick Sciba 42 yard FG
- 02:34 WAKE TD – Mitch Griffis 1 yard pass to Taylor Morin, (Nick Sciba PAT)

Top passers

- CLEM – Trevor Lawrence: 22–28, 351 yards, 1 TD
- WAKE – Sam Hartman: 11–21, 182 yards

Top rushers

- CLEM – Travis Etienne: 17 rushes, 102 yards, 1 TD
- WAKE – Christian Beal-Smith: 11 rushes, 29 yards

Top Receiving

- CLEM – Amari Rodgers: 5 receptions, 90 yards
- WAKE – Taylor Morin: 9 receptions, 93 yards, 1 TD

=== Citadel ===
The Citadel Bulldogs at Clemson Tigers − Game summary

| Quarter | 1 | 2 | 3 | 4 | Total |
|---|---|---|---|---|---|
| The Citadel | 0 | 0 | 0 | 0 | 0 |
| No. 1 Clemson | 28 | 21 | 0 | 0 | 49 |

at Memorial Stadium • Clemson, SC

- Date: September 19, 2020
- Game time: 4:00 p.m.
- Game weather: Temperature: 72 °F (22 °C) • Wind: 8 mph (13 km/h) ENE • Weather: Sunny
- Game attendance: 18,609
- Referee: Jeff Flanagan
- TV announcers (ACC Network): Anish Shroff (play-by-play), Tom Luginbill (color), and Eric Wood (sideline)

Game information

First quarter

- 12:36 CLEM TD – Trevor Lawrence 17 yard pass to Frank Ladson Jr., (B. T. Potter PAT)
- 09:41 CLEM TD – Trevor Lawrence 44 yard pass to Amari Rodgers, (B. T. Potter PAT)
- 02:00 CLEM TD – Trevor Lawrence 2 yard run, (B. T. Potter PAT)
- 01:51 CLEM TD – James Skalski 17 yard fumble recovery, (B. T. Potter PAT)

Second quarter

- 13:00 CLEM TD – DJ Uiagalelei 1 yard run, (B. T. Potter PAT)
- 09:55 CLEM TD – Trevor Lawrence 54 yard pass to Frank Ladson Jr., (B. T. Potter PAT)
- 05:31 CLEM TD – Uiagalelei 6 yard run, (Jonathan Weitz PAT)

Third quarter

- None

Fourth quarter

- None

Top passers

- CLEM – Trevor Lawrence: 8–9, 168 yards, 3 TDs
- CIT – Brandon Rainey: 2–9, 38 yards

Top rushers

- CLEM – Travis Etienne: 8 carries, 68 yards
- CIT – Jaylan Adams: 12 carries, 50 yards

Top Receiving

- CLEM – Frank Ladson Jr.: 3 receptions, 87 yards, 2 TDs
- CIT – Ryan McCarthy: 1 reception, 38 yards

=== Virginia ===
Virginia Cavaliers at Clemson Tigers − Game summary

| Quarter | 1 | 2 | 3 | 4 | Total |
|---|---|---|---|---|---|
| Virginia | 0 | 10 | 7 | 6 | 23 |
| No. 1 Clemson | 10 | 14 | 10 | 7 | 41 |

at Memorial Stadium • Clemson, SC

- Date: October 3, 2020
- Game time: 8:00 p.m.
- Game weather: Temperature: 57 °F (14 °C) • Wind: Calm • Weather: Clear
- Game attendance: 18,735
- Referee: Jeff Heaser
- TV announcers (ACC Network): Dave O'Brien (play-by-play), Tim Hasselbeck (analyst), and Katie George (sideline)

Game information

First quarter

- 13:24 CLEM FG – B. T. Potter 47 yard field goal
- 00:22 CLEM TD – Travis Etienne 16 yard run, (B. T. Potter PAT)

Second quarter

- 09:38 UVA FG – Brian Delaney 27 yard field goal
- 05:23 CLEM TD – Trevor Lawrence 27 yard pass to Amari Rodgers, (B. T. Potter PAT)
- 03:25 CLEM TD – Trevor Lawrence 9 yard pass to Amari Rodgers, (B. T. Potter PAT)
- 00:41 UVA TD – Brennan Armstrong 23 yard pass to Terrell Jana, (Brian Delaney PAT)

Third quarter

- 10:33 CLEM FG – B. T. Potter 42 yard field goal
- 06:05 UVA TD – Brennan Armstrong 3 yard pass to Keytaon Thompson, (Brian Delaney PAT)
- 03:54 CLEM TD – Trevor Lawrence 4 yard pass to Etienne, (B. T. Potter PAT)

Fourth quarter

- 05:27 CLEM TD – Chez Mellusi 2 yard run, (B. T. Potter PAT)
- 01:11 UVA TD – Brennan Armstrong 5 yard pass to Tony Poljan, (2 point conversion failed)

Top passers

- CLEM – Trevor Lawrence: 25–38, 329 yards, 3 TDs
- UVA – Brennan Armstrong: 24–43, 270 yards, 3 TDs, 2 INTs

Top rushers

- CLEM – Travis Etienne: 14 rushes, 73 yards, 1 TD
- UVA – Brennan Armstrong: 22 rushes, 89 yards

Top Receiving

- CLEM – Travis Etienne: 5 receptions, 114 yards, 1 TD
- UVA – Billy Kemp IV: 10 receptions, 96 yards

=== Miami ===
Miami Hurricanes at Clemson Tigers − Game summary

| Quarter | 1 | 2 | 3 | 4 | Total |
|---|---|---|---|---|---|
| No. 7 Miami (FL) | 0 | 10 | 0 | 7 | 17 |
| No. 1 Clemson | 7 | 14 | 14 | 7 | 42 |

at Memorial Stadium • Clemson, SC

- Date: October 10, 2020
- Game time: 7:30 p.m.
- Game weather: Temperature: 74 °F (23 °C) • Wind: ENE @ 8 mph (13 km/h) • Weather: Cloudy
- Game attendance: 18,885
- Referee: Jeff Flanagan
- TV announcers (ABC): Chris Fowler (play-by-play), Kirk Herbstreit (color), and Allison Williams (sideline)

Game information

First quarter

- 09:50 CLEM TD – Trevor Lawrence 24 yard pass to Braden Galloway, (B. T. Potter PAT)

Second quarter

- 14:54 CLEM TD – Travis Etienne 2 yard run, (B. T. Potter PAT)
- 03:53 MIA FG – José Borregales 42 yard field goal
- 1:14 CLEM TD – Trevor Lawrence 11 yard pass to Braden Galloway, (B. T. Potter PAT)
- 00:00 MIA TD – D. J. Ivey 48 yard blocked field goal, (José Borregales PAT)

Third quarter

- 07:56 CLEM TD – Travis Etienne 72 yard run, (B. T. Potter PAT)
- 02:31 CLEM TD – Trevor Lawrence 3 yard run, (B. T. Potter PAT)

Fourth quarter

- 08:31 MIA TD – D'Eriq King 7 yard run, (José Borregales PAT)
- 04:32 CLEM TD – Trevor Lawrence 22 yard pass to Davis Allen, (B. T. Potter PAT)

Top passers

- CLEM – Trevor Lawrence: 29–41, 292 yards, 3 TDs
- MIA – D'Eriq King: 12–28, 121 yards, 2 INT

Top rushers

- CLEM – Travis Etienne: 17 rushes, 149 yards, 2 TDs
- MIA – D'Eriq King: 14 rushes, 84 yards, 1 TD

Top Receiving

- CLEM – Travis Etienne: 8 receptions, 73 yards
- MIA – Keyshawn Smith: 1 reception, 42 yards

=== At Georgia Tech ===
Clemson Tigers at Georgia Tech Yellow Jackets − Game summary

| Quarter | 1 | 2 | 3 | 4 | Total |
|---|---|---|---|---|---|
| No. 1 Clemson | 17 | 35 | 7 | 14 | 73 |
| Georgia Tech | 7 | 0 | 0 | 0 | 7 |

at Bobby Dodd Stadium • Atlanta, GA

- Date: October 17, 2020
- Game time: 12:00 p.m.
- Game weather: Temperature: 74 °F (23 °C) • Wind: Calm • Weather: Sunny
- Game attendance: 11,000
- Referee: Stuart Mullins
- TV announcers (ABC): Bob Wischusen (play-by-play), Dan Orlovsky (color), and Marty Smith (sideline)

Game information

First quarter

- 07:55 CLEM TD – Trevor Lawrence 5 yard pass to Cornell Powell, (B. T. Potter PAT)
- 06:32 GT TD – Jeff Sims 59 yard pass to Jalen Camp, (Jude Kelly PAT)
- 06:14 CLEM TD – Trevor Lawrence 83 yard pass to Amari Rodgers, (B. T. Potter PAT)
- 04:03 CLEM FG – B. T. Potter 30 yard field goal

Second quarter

- 12:43 CLEM TD – Trevor Lawrence 34 yard pass to Davis Allen, (B. T. Potter PAT)
- 07:05 CLEM TD – Nyles Pinckney 1 yard run, (B. T. Potter PAT)
- 03:14 CLEM TD – Trevor Lawrence 8 yard pass to Frank Ladson Jr., (B. T. Potter PAT)
- 02:10 CLEM TD – Travis Etienne 3 yard run, (B. T. Potter PAT)
- 00:16 CLEM TD – Trevor Lawrence 16 yard pass to Amari Rodgers, (B. T. Potter PAT)

Third quarter

- 08:21 CLEM TD – Chez Mellusi 5 yard run, (B. T. Potter PAT)

Fourth quarter

- 11:38 CLEM TD – Hunter Helms 7 yard pass to Kobe Pace, (Aidan Swanson PAT)
- 07:41 CLEM TD – Hunter Helms 35 yard pass to Ajou Ajou, (Aidan Swanson PAT)

Top passers

- CLEM – Trevor Lawrence: 24–33, 404 yards, 5 TDs, 1 INT
- GT – Jeff Sims: 6–13, 81 yards, 1 TD, 1 INT

Top rushers

- CLEM – Travis Etienne: 11 rushes, 44 yards, 1 TD
- GT – Jahmyr Gibbs: 15 rushes, 67 yards

Top Receiving

- CLEM – Amari Rodgers: 6 receptions, 161 yards, 2 TDs
- GT – Jalen Camp: 1 reception, 59 yards, 1 TD

=== Syracuse ===
Syracuse Orange at Clemson Tigers − Game summary

| Quarter | 1 | 2 | 3 | 4 | Total |
|---|---|---|---|---|---|
| Syracuse | 0 | 14 | 7 | 0 | 21 |
| No. 1 Clemson | 17 | 10 | 7 | 13 | 47 |

at Memorial Stadium • Clemson, SC

- Date: October 24, 2020
- Game time: 12:00 p.m.
- Game weather: Temperature: 73 °F (23 °C) • Wind: South @ 3 mph (4.8 km/h) • Weather: Sunny
- Game attendance: 18,629
- Referee: Riley Johnson
- TV announcers (ACC Network): Wes Durham (play-by-play), Roddy Jones (color), and Lericia Harris (sideline)

Game information

First quarter

- 13:37 CLEM TD – Trevor Lawrence 25 yard pass to Cornell Powell, (B. T. Potter PAT)
- 08:46 CLEM FG – B. T. Potter 24 yard field goal
- 04:25 CLEM TD – Travis Etienne 25 yard run, (B. T. Potter PAT)

Second quarter

- 14:15 CUSE TD – Sean Tucker 7 yard run, (Andre Szmyt PAT)
- 02:54 CLEM TD – Lawrence 17 yard pass to Davis Allen, (B. T. Potter PAT)
- 01:18 CUSE TD – Garrett Williams 39 yard interception return, (Andre Szmyt PAT)
- 00:00 CLEM FG – B. T. Potter 36 yard field goal

Third quarter

- 08:41 CUSE TD – Rex Culpepper 83 yard pass to Nykeim Johnson, (Andre Szmyt PAT)
- 01:26 CLEM TD – Andrew Booth Jr. 21 yard fumble recovery, (B. T. Potter PAT)

Fourth quarter

- 13:38 CLEM TD – Etienne 9 yard run, (2 point conversion failed)
- 10:45 CLEM TD – Etienne 1 yard run, (B. T. Potter PAT)

Top passers

- CLEM – Trevor Lawrence: 27–43, 289 yards, 2 TDs, 1 INT
- CUSE – Rex Culpepper: 10–26, 175 yards, 1 TD, 3 INTs

Top rushers

- CLEM – Travis Etienne: 16 rushes, 86 yards, 3 TDs
- CUSE – Sean Tucker: 10 rushes, 63 yards, 1 TD

Top Receiving

- CLEM – Amari Rodgers: 8 receptions, 91 yards
- CUSE – Nykeim Johnson: 1 reception, 83 yards

=== Boston College ===
Boston College Eagles at Clemson Tigers − Game summary

| Quarter | 1 | 2 | 3 | 4 | Total |
|---|---|---|---|---|---|
| Boston College | 14 | 14 | 0 | 0 | 28 |
| No. 1 Clemson | 7 | 6 | 13 | 8 | 34 |

at Memorial Stadium • Clemson, SC

- Date: October 31, 2020
- Game time: 12:00 p.m.
- Game weather: Temperature: 73 °F (23 °C) • Wind: ENE @ 8 mph (13 km/h) • Weather: Sunny
- Game attendance: 18,690
- Referee: Marcus Woods
- TV announcers (ABC): Joe Tessitore (play-by-play), Greg McElroy (color), and Holly Rowe (sideline)

Game information

First quarter

- 13:08 BC TD – Phil Jurkovec 11 yard pass to Zay Flowers, (Aaron Boumerhi PAT)
- 10:54 CLEM TD – DJ Uiagalelei 35 yard pass to Travis Etienne, (B. T. Potter PAT)
- 08:41 BC TD – David Bailey 2 yard run, (Boumerhi PAT)

Second quarter

- 12:14 BC TD – Brandon Sebastian 97 yard fumble recovery, (Aaron Boumerhi PAT)
- 08:44 CLEM FG – B. T. Potter 33 yard field goal
- 01:02 BC TD – Phil Jurkovec 18 yard pass to C. J. Lewis, (Aaron Boumerhi PAT)
- 00:07 CLEM FG – B. T. Potter 50 yard field goal

Third quarter

- 11:38 CLEM TD – DJ Uiagalelei 30 yard run, (B. T. Potter PAT)
- 06:16 CLEM TD – DJ Uiagalelei 8 yard pass to Amari Rodgers, (2 point conversion failed)

Fourth quarter

- 11:34 CLEM TD – Travis Etienne 17 yard run, (B. T. Potter PAT failed)
- 01:18 CLEM SAFETY – Bryan Bresee

Top passers

- CLEM – DJ Uiagalelei: 30–41, 342 yards, 2 TDs
- BC – Phil Jurkovec: 12–24, 204 yards, 2 TDs

Top rushers

- CLEM – Travis Etienne: 20 rushes, 84 yards, 1 TD
- BC – Travis Levy: 10 rushes, 40 yards

Top Receiving

- CLEM – Travis Etienne: 7 receptions, 140 yards, 1 TD
- BC – CJ Lewis: 5 receptions, 66 yards, 1 TD

=== At Notre Dame ===
Clemson Tigers at Notre Dame Fighting Irish − Game summary

| Quarter | 1 | 2 | 3 | 4 | OT | 2OT | Total |
|---|---|---|---|---|---|---|---|
| No. 1 Clemson | 7 | 6 | 10 | 10 | 7 | 0 | 40 |
| No. 4 Notre Dame | 10 | 13 | 0 | 10 | 7 | 7 | 47 |

at Notre Dame Stadium • Notre Dame, IN

- Date: November 7, 2020
- Game time: 7:30 p.m.
- Game weather: Temperature: 61 °F (16 °C) • Wind: SE @ 6 mph (9.7 km/h) • Weather: Clear
- Game attendance: 11,011
- Referee: Jeff Heaser
- TV announcers (NBC/USA): Mike Tirico (play-by-play), Tony Dungy (color), Kathryn Tappen (sideline), and Jac Collinsworth (sideline)

Game information

First quarter

- 14:27 ND TD – Kyren Williams 65 yard rush, (Jonathan Doerer PAT)
- 05:55 ND FG – Jonathan Doerer 24 yard field goal
- 04:11 CLEM TD – DJ Uiagalelei 53 yard pass to Cornell Powell, (B. T. Potter PAT)

Second quarter

- 13:09 ND FG – Jonathan Doerer 27 yard field goal
- 09:32 CLEM FG – B. T. Potter 25 yard field goal
- 05:53 ND TD – Jeremiah Owusu-Koramoah 23 yard fumble return, (Doerer PAT)
- 02:41 ND FG – Jonathan Doerer 45 yard field goal
- 01:09 CLEM FG – B. T. Potter 45 yard field goal

Third quarter

- 12:15 CLEM FG – B. T. Potter 46 yard field goal
- 04:12 CLEM TD – DJ Uiagalelei 10 yard pass to Davis Allen, (B. T. Potter PAT)

Fourth quarter

- 11:37 ND FG – Jonathan Doerer 44 yard field goal
- 09:42 CLEM FG – B. T. Potter 30 yard field goal
- 03:33 CLEM TD – Travis Etienne 3 yard run, (B. T. Potter PAT)
- 00:22 ND TD – Ian Book 4 yard pass to Avery Davis, (Jonathan Doerer PAT)

Overtime 1

- CLEM TD – DJ Uiagalelei 1 yard rush, (B. T. Potter PAT)
- ND TD – Kyren Williams 3 yard rush, (Jonathan Doerer PAT)

Overtime 2

- ND TD – Kyren Williams 3 yard rush, (Jonathan Doerer PAT)

Top passers

- CLEM – DJ Uiagalelei: 29–44, 439 yards, 2 TDs
- ND – Ian Book: 22–39, 310 yards, 1 TD

Top rushers

- CLEM – Travis Etienne: 18 rushes, 28 yards, 1 TD
- ND – Kyren Williams: 23 rushes, 140 yards, 3 TDs

Top Receiving

- CLEM – Cornell Powell: 6 receptions, 161 yards, 1 TD
- ND – Javon McKinley: 5 receptions, 102 yards

=== Pittsburgh ===
Pittsburgh Panthers at Clemson Tigers − Game summary

| Quarter | 1 | 2 | 3 | 4 | Total |
|---|---|---|---|---|---|
| Pittsburgh | 0 | 10 | 7 | 0 | 17 |
| No. 3 Clemson | 31 | 7 | 7 | 7 | 52 |

at Memorial Stadium • Clemson, SC

- Date: November 28, 2020
- Game time: 3:30 p.m.
- Game weather: Temperature: 68 °F (20 °C) • Wind: SE @ 1 mph (1.6 km/h) • Weather: Sunny
- Game attendance: 18,819
- Referee: Marcus Woods
- TV announcers (ABC): Sean McDonough (play-by-play), Todd Blackledge (color), Todd McShay, and Molly McGrath (sidelines)

Game information

First quarter

- 11:36 CLEM TD – Trevor Lawrence 5 yard pass to E.J. Williams Jr., (B. T. Potter PAT)
- 09:26 CLEM FG – B. T. Potter 46 yard field goal
- 07:35 CLEM TD – Trevor Lawrence 43 yard pass to Cornell Powell, (B. T. Potter PAT)
- 04:55 CLEM TD – Travis Etienne 2 yard run, (B. T. Potter PAT)
- 00:01 CLEM TD – Lyn-J Dixon 1 yard run, (B. T. Potter PAT)

Second quarter

- 09:11 PITT FG – Alex Kessman 23 yard field goal
- 07:59 CLEM TD – Chez Mellusi 2 yard run, (B. T. Potter PAT)
- 01:13 PITT TD – Kenny Pickett 18 yard pass to Jordan Addison, (Alex Kessman PAT)

Third quarter

- 14:24 PITT TD – Kenny Pickett 4 yard pass to Vincent Davis, (Alex Kessman PAT)
- 00:52 CLEM TD – Travis Etienne 3 yard run, (B. T. Potter PAT)

Fourth quarter

- 10:48 CLEM TD – DJ Uiagalelei 9 yard pass to Chez Mellusi, (B. T. Potter PAT)

Top passers

- CLEM – Trevor Lawrence: 26–37, 403 yards, 2 TDs
- PITT – Kenny Pickett: 22–39, 209 yards, 2 TDs, 4 INTs

Top rushers

- CLEM – Travis Etienne: 11 rushes, 58 yards, 2 TDs
- PITT – A. J. Davis: 4 rushes, 21 yards

Top Receiving

- CLEM – Cornell Powell: 6 receptions, 176 yards, 1 TD
- PITT – Jared Wayne: 5 receptions, 62 yards

=== At Virginia Tech ===
Clemson Tigers at Virginia Tech Hokies − Game summary

| Quarter | 1 | 2 | 3 | 4 | Total |
|---|---|---|---|---|---|
| No. 3 Clemson | 10 | 7 | 14 | 14 | 45 |
| Virginia Tech | 7 | 3 | 0 | 0 | 10 |

at Lane Stadium • Blacksburg, VA

- Date: December 5, 2020
- Game time: 7:30 p.m.
- Game weather: Temperature: 37 °F (3 °C) • Wind: NW @ 8 mph (13 km/h) • Weather: Cloudy
- Game attendance: 250
- Referee: Jeff Heaser
- TV announcers (ABC): Chris Fowler (play-by-play), Kirk Herbstreit (color), and Maria Taylor (sideline)

Game information

First quarter

- 08:27 CLEM FG – B. T. Potter 28 yard field goal
- 03:45 VT TD – Khalil Herbert 4 yard run, (Brian Johnson PAT)
- 00:12 CLEM TD – Trevor Lawrence 17 yard run, (B. T. Potter PAT)

Second quarter

- 03:52 VT FG – Brian Johnson 54 yard field goal
- 01:06 CLEM TD – Lyn-J Dixon 19 yard run, (B. T. Potter PAT)

Third quarter

- 04:45 CLEM TD – Trevor Lawrence 7 yard run, (B. T. Potter PAT)
- 01:28 CLEM TD – Derion Kendrick 66 yard fumble recovery, (B. T. Potter PAT)

Fourth quarter

- 10:16 CLEM TD – Trevor Lawrence 65 yard pass to Cornell Powell, (B. T. Potter PAT)
- 04:01 CLEM TD – Darien Rencher 50 yard run, (B. T. Potter PAT)

Top passers

- CLEM – Trevor Lawrence: 12–22, 195 yards, 1 TD, 1 INT
- VT – Braxton Burmeister: 10–12, 127 yards

Top rushers

- CLEM – Travis Etienne: 16 rushes, 66 yards
- VT – Khalil Herbert: 21 rushes, 96 yards, 1 TD

Top Receiving

- CLEM – Cornell Powell: 4 receptions, 90 yards, 1 TD
- VT – Raheem Blackshear: 4 receptions, 68 yards

=== Vs. Notre Dame ===
Clemson Tigers vs. Notre Dame Fighting Irish (ACC Championship game) − Game summary

| Quarter | 1 | 2 | 3 | 4 | Total |
|---|---|---|---|---|---|
| No. 2 Notre Dame | 3 | 0 | 0 | 7 | 10 |
| No. 3 Clemson | 7 | 17 | 7 | 3 | 34 |

at Bank of America Stadium • Charlotte, NC

- Date: December 19, 2020
- Game time: 4:00 p.m.
- Game weather: Temperature: 48 °F (9 °C) • Wind: SSE @ 4 mph (6.4 km/h) • Weather: Partly Cloudy
- Game attendance: 5,240
- TV announcers (ABC): Chris Fowler (play-by-play), Kirk Herbstreit (color), and Maria Taylor (sideline)

Game information

First quarter

- 08:16 ND FG – Jonathan Doerer 51 yard field goal
- 00:41 CLEM TD – Trevor Lawrence 67 yard pass to Amari Rodgers, (B. T. Potter PAT)

Second quarter

- 09:24 CLEM TD – Trevor Lawrence 33 yard pass to E.J. Williams, (B. T. Potter PAT)
- 04:28 CLEM FG – B. T. Potter 27 yard field goal
- 00:21 CLEM TD – Travis Etienne 44 yard run, (B. T. Potter PAT)

Third quarter

- 03:43 CLEM TD – Trevor Lawrence 34 yard run, (B. T. Potter PAT)

Fourth quarter

- 10:31 CLEM FG – B. T. Potter 37 yard field goal
- 08:09 ND TD – Chris Tyree 21 yard run, (Jonathan Doerer PAT)

Top passers

- CLEM – Trevor Lawrence: 25–36, 322 yards, 2 TDs, 1 INT
- ND – Ian Book: 20–28, 219 yards

Top rushers

- CLEM – Travis Etienne: 10 rushes, 124 yards, 1 TD
- ND – Kyren Williams: 15 rushes, 50 yards

Top Receiving

- CLEM – Amari Rodgers: 8 receptions, 121 yards, 1 TD
- ND – Ben Skowronek: 4 receptions, 54 yards

=== Vs. Ohio State ===
Clemson Tigers vs. Ohio State Buckeyes (Sugar Bowl-CFP semifinal)− Game summary

| Quarter | 1 | 2 | 3 | 4 | Total |
|---|---|---|---|---|---|
| No. 3 Ohio State | 14 | 21 | 7 | 7 | 49 |
| No. 2 Clemson | 14 | 0 | 7 | 7 | 28 |

at Mercedes-Benz Superdome • New Orleans, LA

- Date: January 1, 2021
- Game time: 8:16 p.m.
- Game weather: n/a (game played indoors)
- Game attendance: 3,000
- Referee: David Alvarez (Big 12)
- TV announcers (ESPN/ESPN Radio): Chris Fowler (play-by-play), Kirk Herbstreit (color), Maria Taylor, and Tom Rinaldi (sidelines)/Shawn Kelley (play-by-play) and Barrett Jones (analyst)

Game information

First quarter

- 12:10 CLEM TD – Trevor Lawrence 2 yard rush (B. T. Potter PAT)
- 07:59 OSU TD – Trey Sermon 32 yard rush (Blake Haubeil PAT)
- 05:01 CLEM TD – Travis Etienne 3 yard rush (B. T. Potter PAT)
- 01:36 OSU TD – Justin Fields 8 yard pass to Luke Farrell (Blake Haubeil PAT)

Second quarter

- 10:35 OSU TD – Justin Fields 17 yard pass to Jeremy Ruckert (Blake Haubeil PAT)
- 05:12 OSU TD – Justin Fields 9 yard pass to Chris Olave (Blake Haubeil PAT)
- 00:11 OSU TD – Justin Fields 12 yard pass to Jeremy Ruckert (Blake Haubeil PAT)

Third quarter

- 07:56 CLEM TD – Trevor Lawrence 10 yard pass to Cornell Powell (B. T. Potter PAT)
- 04:55 OSU TD – Justin Fields 56 yard pass to Olave (Blake Haubeil PAT)

Fourth quarter

- 14:03 OSU TD – Justin Fields 45 yard pass to Jameson Williams (Blake Haubeil PAT)
- 10:42 CLEM TD – Trevor Lawrence 26 yard pass to Cornell Powell (B. T. Potter PAT)

Top passers

- CLEM – Trevor Lawrence: 33–48, 400 yards, 2 TD 1 INT
- OSU – Justin Fields: 22–28, 385 yards, 6 TD, 1 INT

Top rushers

- CLEM – Travis Etienne: 10 carries, 35 yards, 1 TD
- OSU – Trey Sermon: 31 carries, 193 yards, 1 TD

Top Receiving

- CLEM – Cornell Powell: 8 receptions, 139 yards, 2 TD
- OSU – Chris Olave: 6 receptions, 136 yards, 2 TD

== Awards and honors ==
Individual Awards
| Player | Position | Award | Ref. |
|---|---|---|---|
| Trevor Lawrence | QB | ACC Player of the Year | |
| Trevor Lawrence | QB | ACC Offensive Player of the Year | |
| Bryan Bresee | DT | ACC Defensive Rookie of the Year | |

All-American
| Player | AP | AFCA | FWAA | TSN | WCFF | Designation |
|---|---|---|---|---|---|---|
| Travis Etienne | 1 | 2 | 1 | 1 | 2 | Consensus |
| Trevor Lawrence | 3 | 2 | 1 | – | 2 | None |
| Nolan Turner | – | 2 | – | – | – | None |
The NCAA recognizes a selection to all five of the AP, AFCA, FWAA, TSN and WCFF first teams for unanimous selections and three of five for consensus selections. HM = Honorable mention. Source:

All-ACC
| Player | Position | Team |
|---|---|---|
| Trevor Lawrence | QB | First Team |
| Travis Etienne | RB & APB | First Team |
| Amari Rodgers | WR | First Team |
| Bryan Bresee | DT | First Team |
| Derion Kendrick | CB | First Team |
| Jackson Carman | OT | Second Team |
| Matt Bockhorst | OG | Second Team |
| James Skalski | LB | Second Team |
| Andrew Booth Jr. | CB | Second Team |
| Nolan Turner | S | Second Team |
| Cornell Powell | WR | Third Team |
| Jordan McFadden | OT | Honorable; Mention |
| Will Putnam | OG | Honorable; Mention |
| Cade Stewart | C | Honorable; Mention |
| Myles Murphy | DE | Honorable; Mention |
| Baylon Spector | LB | Honorable; Mention |
| Mike Jones Jr. | LB | Honorable; Mention |
| Lannden Zanders | S | Honorable; Mention |
| B. T. Potter | PK | Honorable; Mention |

== Players drafted into the NFL ==
| Round | Pick | Player | Position | NFL club |
|---|---|---|---|---|
| 1 | 1 | Trevor Lawrence | QB | Jacksonville Jaguars |
| 1 | 25 | Travis Etienne | RB | Jacksonville Jaguars |
| 2 | 46 | Jackson Carman | OT | Cincinnati Bengals |
| 3 | 85 | Amari Rodgers | WR | Green Bay Packers |
| 5 | 181 | Cornell Powell | WR | Kansas City Chiefs |
