= 2020 Notre Dame Fighting Irish football team =

American college football season

2020 Notre Dame Fighting Irish football

ACC Championship Game, L 10–34 vs. Clemson

Rose Bowl (CFP semifinal), L 14–31 vs. Alabama
- Conference: Atlantic Coast Conference

Ranking
- Coaches: No. 5
- AP: No. 5
- Record: 10–2 (9–0 ACC)
- Head coach: Brian Kelly (11th season)
- Offensive coordinator: Tommy Rees (1st season)
- Offensive scheme: Multiple
- Defensive coordinator: Clark Lea (3rd season)
- Base defense: 4–2–5
- MVP: Jeremiah Owusu-Koramoah
- Captains: Ian Book; Shaun Crawford; Robert Hainsey; Daelin Hayes; Adetokunbo Ogundeji
- Home stadium: Notre Dame Stadium

Uniform
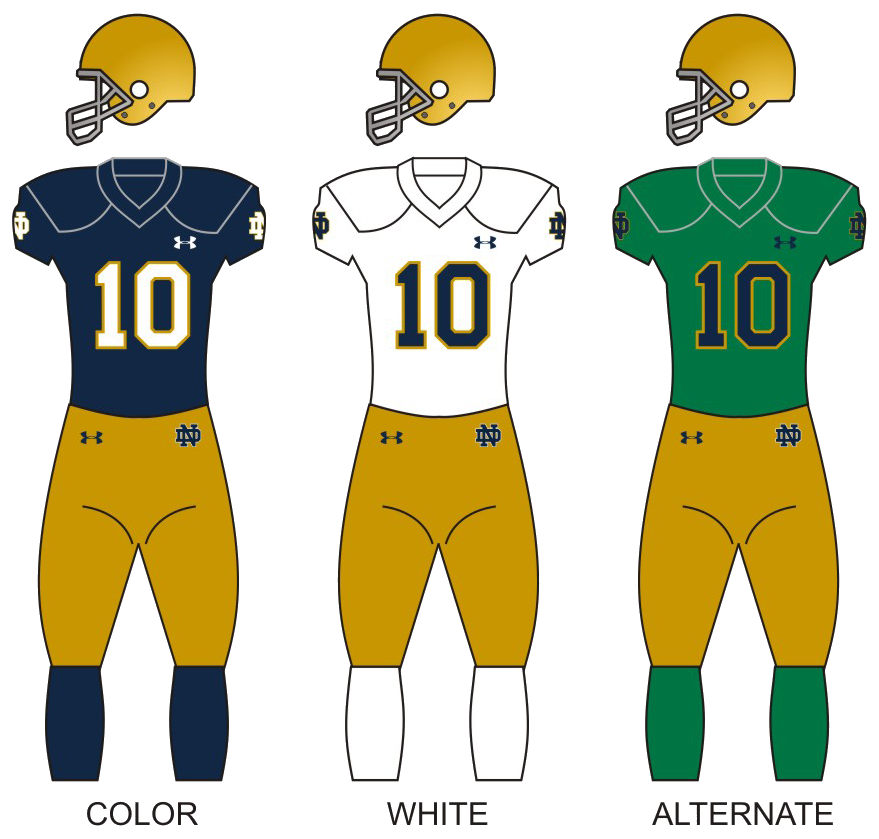

2020 Atlantic Coast Conference football standings
	Conf.			Overall
Team	W		L	W		L
No. 5 Notre Dame y^	9	–	0	10	–	2
No. 3 Clemson y$^	8	–	1	10	–	2
No. 22 Miami (FL)	7	–	2	8	–	3
No. 18 North Carolina	7	–	3	8	–	4
NC State	7	–	3	8	–	4
Boston College	5	–	5	6	–	5
Pittsburgh	5	–	5	6	–	5
Virginia Tech	5	–	5	5	–	6
Virginia	4	–	5	5	–	5
Wake Forest	3	–	4	4	–	5
Georgia Tech	3	–	6	3	–	7
Louisville	3	–	7	4	–	7
Florida State	2	–	6	3	–	6
Duke	1	–	9	2	–	9
Syracuse	1	–	9	1	–	10
Championship: Clemson 34, Notre Dame 10
^ – College Football Playoff participant; $ – Conference champion; y – Championship game participant; Rankings from AP Poll.

The 2020 Notre Dame Fighting Irish football team was an American football team that, due to COVID-19 restrictions on non-conference games, represented the University of Notre Dame as a member of the Atlantic Coast Conference (ACC) during the 2020 NCAA Division I FBS football season. In their 11th year under head coach Brian Kelly, the Irish compiled a 10–2 record (9–0 in ACC games), outscored opponents by a total of 401 to 236, and were ranked No. 5 in the final AP and Coaches Polls. They were undefeated in the regular season but lost to Clemson in the ACC Championship Game and to Alabama in the Rose Bowl (CFP semifinal). Because of COVID restrictions, Notre Dame did not play its rivalry games against Navy (previously played every season since 1927), USC (since 1946), or Stanford (since 1997).

The team's statistical leaders included quarterback Ian Book (2,830 passing yards), running back Kyren Williams (1,125 rushing yards), wide receiver Javon McKinley (717 receiving yards), and kicker Jonathan Doerer (93 points scored). Offensive linemen Aaron Banks and Liam Eichenberg and linebacker Jeremiah Owusu-Koramoah were selected as consensus first-team players on the 2020 All-America college football team.

The team played its home games at Notre Dame Stadium in Notre Dame, Indiana.

== Offseason ==
=== Departures ===
NFL

- TE Cole Kmet (drafted by the Chicago Bears)
- WR Chase Claypool (drafted by the Pittsburgh Steelers)
- LB Julian Okwara (drafted by the Detroit Lions)
- CB Troy Pride (drafted by the Carolina Panthers)
- LB Khalid Kareem (drafted by the Cincinnati Bengals)
- S Alohi Gilman (drafted by the Los Angeles Chargers)
- LB Asmar Bilal (signed by the Los Angeles Chargers)
- S Jalen Elliott (signed by the Detroit Lions)
- WR Chris Finke (signed by the San Francisco 49ers)
- LB Jamir Jones (signed by the Houston Texans)
- RB Tony Jones Jr. (signed by the New Orleans Saints)
- CB Donte' Vaughn (signed by the Los Angeles Chargers)

Transfers out

- CB Temitope Agoro (transferred to Duquesne)
- LB Jonathan Jones (transferred to Toledo)
- QB Phil Jurkovec (transferred to Boston College)
- OL John Olmstead (transferred to Lafayette)
- WR/DB Isaiah Robertson (entered transfer portal)
- WR Michael Young Jr. (transferred to Cincinnati)

Other

- OL Cole Mabry (medically retired from football)

=== Transfers in ===
- K Dawson Goepferich (transferred from Brown)
- CB Nick McCloud (transferred from NC State)
- S Isaiah Pryor (transferred from Ohio State)
- WR Ben Skowronek (transferred from Northwestern)

== Schedule ==
The 2020 schedule was officially released on December 7, 2017.

Due to suspensions of athletic programs nationwide as a result of the COVID-19 pandemic, the team called off the 2020 edition of its spring Blue-Gold Game. The Emerald Isle Classic game against Navy at Aviva Stadium in Dublin, Ireland was tentatively rescheduled for Navy–Marine Corps Memorial Stadium in Annapolis, Maryland, and three games were scrapped after the Big Ten and Pac-12 elected to restrict play to conference opponents only. This included a game scheduled against Wisconsin on October 3 (which was to be played at Lambeau Field in Green Bay as a Shamrock Series game), the team's rivalry game against Stanford, and the team's rivalry game against USC (resulting in its postponement for the first time since World War II).

In regards to replacing the canceled games, head coach Brian Kelly told ESPN's Mike Greenberg that "our phone is ringing off the hook right now in terms of teams looking for games", and that Notre Dame athletics director Jack Swarbrick had been communicating with ACC commissioner John Swofford; as per its membership in most other sports, Notre Dame typically plays five games against ACC opponents per-season. On July 29, 2020, the ACC officially announced that Notre Dame would play its 2020 season within the conference, with 10 games against ACC opponents, a non-conference game of its choice played in-state, and being eligible to compete for the conference championship. The team contributed revenue from its broadcast rights with NBC into the conference's shared pool, split between all ACC members and Notre Dame.

Notre Dame's opening game against Duke marked the first time that the Fighting Irish had ever competed in, or won a conference game.

=== Original ===
Date	Time	Opponent	Site	TV	Result	Source
August 29	2:00 p.m.	vs. Navy	Aviva Stadium; Dublin, Ireland (Emerald Isle Classic, rivalry, College GameDay)	ESPN	No contest	
September 12	2:30 p.m.	Arkansas	Notre Dame Stadium; Notre Dame, IN	NBC	No contest	
September 19	2:30 p.m.	Western Michigan	Notre Dame Stadium; Notre Dame, IN	NBC	No contest	
September 26		at Wake Forest	Bank of America Stadium; Charlotte, NC		Rescheduled	
October 3	7:30 p.m.	vs. Wisconsin	Lambeau Field; Green Bay, WI (Shamrock Series)	NBC	No contest	
October 10	7:30 p.m.	Stanford	Notre Dame Stadium; Notre Dame, IN (rivalry)	NBC	No contest	
October 17		at Pittsburgh	Heinz Field; Pittsburgh, PA (rivalry)		Rescheduled	
October 31	3:30 p.m.	Duke	Notre Dame Stadium; Notre Dame, IN	NBC	Rescheduled	
November 7	7:30 p.m.	Clemson	Notre Dame Stadium; Notre Dame, IN	NBC	No change	
November 14		at Georgia Tech	Mercedes-Benz Stadium; Atlanta, GA (rivalry)		Rescheduled	
November 21	2:30 p.m.	Louisville	Notre Dame Stadium; Notre Dame, IN	NBC	Rescheduled	
November 28		at USC	Los Angeles Memorial Coliseum; Los Angeles, CA (rivalry)		No contest	
All times are in Eastern time

=== Revised ===
Date	Time	Opponent	Rank	Site	TV	Result	Attendance	Source
September 12	2:30 p.m.	Duke	No. 10	Notre Dame Stadium; Notre Dame, IN	NBC	W 27–13	10,097	
September 19	2:30 p.m.	South Florida*	No. 7	Notre Dame Stadium; Notre Dame, IN	USA	W 52–0	10,085	
October 10	7:30 p.m.	Florida State	No. 5	Notre Dame Stadium; Notre Dame, IN (rivalry)	NBC	W 42–26	10,409	
October 17	2:30 p.m.	Louisville	No. 4	Notre Dame Stadium; Notre Dame, IN	NBC	W 12–7	10,182	
October 24	3:30 p.m.	at Pittsburgh	No. 3	Heinz Field; Pittsburgh, PA (rivalry)	ABC	W 45–3	5,451	
October 31	3:30 p.m.	at Georgia Tech	No. 4	Bobby Dodd Stadium; Atlanta, GA (rivalry)	ABC	W 31–13	11,000	
November 7	7:30 p.m.	No. 1 Clemson	No. 4	Notre Dame Stadium; Notre Dame, IN (College GameDay)	NBC, USA	W 47–40 ^{2OT}	11,011	
November 14	3:30 p.m.	at Boston College	No. 2	Alumni Stadium; Chestnut Hill, MA (Holy War)	ABC	W 45–31	0	
November 27	3:30 p.m.	at No. 19 North Carolina	No. 2	Kenan Memorial Stadium; Chapel Hill, NC (rivalry)	ABC	W 31–17	3,535	
December 5	2:30 p.m.	Syracuse	No. 2	Notre Dame Stadium; Notre Dame, IN	NBC	W 45–21	6,831	
December 12	3:30 p.m.	Wake Forest	No. 2	Truist Field at Wake Forest; Winston-Salem, NC	ABC	No contest		
December 19	4:00 p.m.	vs. No. 3 Clemson	No. 2	Bank of America Stadium; Charlotte, NC (ACC Championship Game, College GameDay)	ABC	L 10–34	5,240	
January 1, 2021	5:00 p.m.	vs. No. 1 Alabama*	No. 4	AT&T Stadium; Arlington, TX (Rose Bowl – CFP Semifinal, College GameDay)	ESPN	L 14–31	18,373	
*Non-conference game; Rankings from AP Poll and CFP Rankings after November 24 released prior to game; All times are in Eastern time

== Rankings ==
Ranking movements Legend: ██ Increase in ranking ██ Decrease in ranking ( ) = First-place votes
	Week																	
Poll	Pre	1	2	3	4	5	6	7	8	9	10	11	12	13	14	15	16	Final
AP	10	10*	7	7	5	5	4	3	4	4	2 (2)	2 (1)	2	2	2	2	4	5
Coaches	10	10*	7	7	5	5	4	3	4	4	2 (4)	2 (3)	2 (2)	2 (2)	2 (2)	2 (2)	4	5
CFP	Not released												2	2	2	2	4	Not released

== Personnel ==
2020 Notre Dame Fighting Irish football team roster
Players
Coaches
Offense

Pos.	#	Name	Class
WR	0	Braden Lenzy	Jr
WR	3	Avery Davis	Sr
WR	4	Kevin Austin Jr.	Jr
QB	7	Brendon Clark	So
RB	8	Jafar Armstrong	Sr
QB	10	Drew Pyne	Fr
WR	11	Ben Skowronek	GS
QB	12	Ian Book (C)	GS
WR	13	Lawrence Keys III	Jr
QB	14	J.D. Carney	Sr
WR	15	Jordan Johnson	Fr
RB	16	Cameron Ekanayake	Sr
QB	17	Cole Capen	Jr
WR	18	Joe Wilkins Jr.	Jr
RB	20	C'Bo Flemister	Jr
RB	22	Kendall Abdur-Rahman	So
RB	23	Kyren Williams	So
TE	24	Tommy Tremble	Jr
RB	25	Chris Tyree	Fr
WR	26	Leo Albano	Jr
QB	27	Chase Ketterer	Fr
WR	28	Griffin Eifert	Fr
WR	32	Matt Salerno	Jr
RB	34	Jahmir Smith	Jr
WR	37	Henry Cook	Fr
WR	43	Greg Mailey	Jr
TE	48	Xavier Lezynski	GS
TE	49	Jack Henige	Sr
OL	52	Zeke Correll	So
OL	53	Quinn Murphy	So
OL	55	Jarrett Patterson	Jr
OL	56	John Dirksen	Jr
OL	61	Colin Grunhard	Sr
OL	62	Brennan Wicks	Fr
OL	64	Max Siegel II	Jr
OL	68	Michael Carmody	Fr
OL	69	Aaron Banks	Sr
OL	70	Hunter Spears	So
OL	72	Robert Hainsey (C)	Sr
OL	73	Andrew Kristofic	So
OL	74	Liam Eichenberg	GS
OL	75	Josh Lugg	Sr
OL	76	Dillan Gibbons	Sr
OL	77	Quinn Carroll	So
OL	78	Tommy Kraemer	GS
OL	79	Tosh Baker	Fr
WR	80	Micah Jones	Jr
WR	81	Jay Brunelle	Fr
WR	82	Xavier Watts	Fr
TE	83	Charlie Selna	Fr
TE	84	Kevin Bauman	Fr
TE	85	George Takacs	Jr
WR	86	Conor Ratigan	So
TE	87	Michael Mayer	Fr
WR	88	Javon McKinley	GS
TE	89	Brock Wright	Sr

Defense

Pos.	#	Name	Class
LB	2	Jordan Genmark Heath	Sr
S	3	Houston Griffith	Jr
CB	4	Nick McCloud	GS
CB	5	Cam Hart	So
LB	6	Jeremiah Owusu-Koramoah	Sr
DL	7	Isaiah Foskey	So
DL	9	Daelin Hayes (C)	GS
S	10	Isaiah Pryor	GS
CB	11	Ramon Henderson	Fr
S	12	DJ Brown	Jr
LB	13	Paul Moala	Jr
S	14	Kyle Hamilton	So
CB	15	Isaiah Rutherford	So
S	16	KJ Wallace	So
DL	17	Jordan Botelho	Fr
DL	18	NaNa Osafo-Mensah	So
DL	19	Justin Ademilola	Jr
S	20	Shaun Crawford (C)	GS
CB	21	Caleb Offord	Fr
S	23	Litchfield Ajavon	So
LB	24	Jack Kiser	So
S	25	John Mahoney	Sr
CB	26	Clarence Lewis	Fr
LB	27	JD Bertrand	So
CB	28	TaRiq Bracy	Jr
DL	29	Ovie Oghoufo	Jr
S	30	Chris Velotta	So
LB	31	Jack Lamb	Jr
S	32	Patrick Pelini	Sr
LB	33	Shayne Simon	Jr
LB	34	Osita Ekwonu	So
LB	35	Marist Liufau	So
S	36	Eddie Scheidler	So
S	37	Chase Love	Jr
LB	40	Drew White	Sr
DL	41	Kurt Hinish	Sr
CB	43	Marcus Thorne	Jr
DL	47	Kofi Wardlow	Sr
LB	50	Reed Gregory	Sr
LB	52	Bo Bauer	Jr
DL	54	Jacob Lacey	So
DL	55	Ja'Mion Franklin	Jr
DL	56	Howard Cross III	So
DL	57	Jayson Ademilola	Jr
DL	91	Adetokunbo Ogundeji (C)	GS
DT	92	Aidan Keanaaina	Fr
DL	93	Zane Heemsoth	So
DL	94	Giovanni Ghilotti	Fr
DL	95	Myron Tagovailoa-Amosa	Sr
DL	98	Alexander Ehrensberger	Fr
DL	99	Rylie Mills	Fr

Special teams

Pos.	#	Name	Class
P	19	Jay Bramblett	So
P	30	Jake Rittman	Jr
K	38	Dawson Goepferich	GS
K	39	Jonathan Doerer	Sr
LS	44	Alex Peitsch	Fr
LS	46	Axel Raarup	Jr
LS	65	Michael Vinson	Jr
K	98	Harrison Leonard	So

Head coach

- Brian Kelly (Assumption)

Coordinators/assistant coaches

- Clark Lea – Defensive Coordinator/Linebackers
- Tommy Rees – Offensive Coordinator/Quarterbacks
- Mike Elston – Associate Head Coach/Defensive Line
- Brian Polian – Recruiting Coordinator/Special Teams Coordinator
- Lance Taylor – Running Backs/Run Game Coordinator
- Jeff Quinn – Offensive Line
- Mike Mickens – Cornerbacks
- Del Alexander – Wide Receivers
- Terry Joseph – Defensive Backs/Defensive Pass Game Coordinator
- John McNulty – Tight Ends
- Kerry Cooks – Defensive Analyst
- Pat Kramer – Senior Offensive Analyst
- Nick Lezynski – Senior Defensive Analyst
- Chris O'Leary – Graduate Assistant (Defense)
- Mike O'Guin – Graduate Assistant (Offense)
- Dean Petzing – Offensive Analyst
- Gus Ragland – Graduate Assistant (Offense)
- Asauni Rufus – Special Teams Analyst
- Chris Watt – Graduate Assistant (Offense)
- Matt Balis – Director of Football Performance
- Ron Powlus – Associate Vice President & Chief Operating Officer
- Olivia Mitchell – Assistant Athletics Director, Football Operations

Legend

- (C) Team captain
- (S) Suspended
- (I) Ineligible
- Injured
- Redshirt

Roster

== Game summaries ==
=== Duke ===
Duke at Notre Dame

Team	1	2	3	4	Total
Blue Devils	3	3	7	0	13
• No. 10 Fighting Irish	0	10	7	10	27

- Date: September 12, 2020
- Location: Notre Dame Stadium
  South Bend, IN
- Game start: 2:40 p.m. EDT
- Elapsed time: 4 hours and 2 minutes
- Game attendance: 10,097
- Game weather: Temperature: 72 °F (22 °C) • Weather: Cloudy • Wind: SE 4 MPH
- Referee: Jeff Heaser
- TV announcers (NBC): Mike Tirico (play–by–play), Tony Dungy (analyst), and Jac Collinsworth (sideline)

Scoring summary
1	07:01	DU	Charlie Ham 29–yard field goal (10 plays, 79 yards, 3:53)	DU 3–0
2	10:39	ND	Kyren Williams 1–yard run (Jonathan Dorerer kick) (12 plays, 96 yards, 4:37)	ND 7–3
2	03:20	DU	Charlie Ham 30–yard field goal (11 plays, 80 yards, 4:12)	ND 7–6
2	00:00	ND	Jonathan Dorerer 48–yard field goal (9 plays, 54 yards, 1:13)	ND 10–6
3	07:57	ND	Kyren Williams 26–yard run (Jonathan Dorerer kick) (7 plays, 59 yards, 3:32)	ND 17–6
3	02:19	DU	Chase Brice 2–yard run (Charlie Ham kick) (6 plays, 39 yards, 2:24)	ND 17–13
4	10:58	ND	Avery Davis 17–yard pass from Ian Book (Jonathan Dorerer kick) (15 plays, 83 yards, 6:14)	ND 24–13
4	05:21	ND	Jonathan Dorerer 34–yard field goal (6 plays, 40 yards, 3:45)	ND 27–13

Statistics	Duke	Notre Dame
First downs	18	24
Total yards	338	441
Rushing yards	79	178
Passing yards	259	263
Turnovers	4	0
Time of possession	26:36	33:24

Team	Category	Player	Statistics
Duke	Passing	Chase Brice	20/37, 259 yards
Duke	Rushing	Deon Jackson	15 carries, 52 yards
Duke	Receiving	Eli Pancol	3 receptions, 78 yards
Notre Dame	Passing	Ian Book	19/31, 263 yards, 1 TD, 1 INT
Notre Dame	Rushing	Kyren Williams	19 carries, 112 yards, 2 TDs
Notre Dame	Receiving	Kyren Williams	2 receptions, 93 yards

=== South Florida ===
South Florida at Notre Dame

Team	1	2	3	4	Total
Bulls	0	0	0	0	0
• No. 7 Fighting Irish	14	21	10	7	52

- Date: September 19, 2020
- Location: Notre Dame Stadium
  South Bend, IN
- Game start: 2:39 p.m. EDT
- Elapsed time: 3 hours and 7 minutes
- Game attendance: 10,085
- Game weather: Temperature: 62 °F (17 °C) • Weather: Sunny • Wind: E 4 MPH
- Referee: Marcus Woods
- TV announcers (USA): Paul Burmeister (play–by–play), Tony Dungy (analyst), and Jac Collinsworth (sideline)

Scoring summary
1	12:05	ND	Ian Book 4–yard run (Jonathan Doerer kick) (7 plays, 55 yards, 2:50)	ND 7–0
1	07:06	ND	Chris Tyree 1–yard run (Jonathan Doerer kick) (7 plays, 43 yards, 3:24)	ND 14–0
2	14:25	ND	Ian Book 1–yard run (Jonathan Doerer kick) (11 plays, 58 yards, 5:07)	ND 21–0
2	11:15	ND	C'Bo Flemister 26–yard run (Jonathan Doerer kick) (5 plays, 53 yards, 1:57)	ND 28–0
2	01:55	ND	Ian Book 1–yard run (Jonathan Doerer kick) (4 plays, 25 yards, 0:54)	ND 35–0
3	06:34	ND	Jonathan Doerer 22–yard field goal (10 plays, 60 yards, 3:21)	ND 38–0
3	03:23	ND	Jordan Botelho 1–yard blocked punt return (Jonathan Doerer kick)	ND 45–0
4	02:15	ND	Jafar Armstrong 5–yard run (Dawson Goepferich kick) (10 plays, 66 yards, 7:00)	ND 52–0

Statistics	South Florida	Notre Dame
First downs	11	21
Total yards	231	430
Rushing yards	106	281
Passing yards	125	149
Turnovers	0	2
Time of possession	27:33	32:27

Team	Category	Player	Statistics
South Florida	Passing	Jordan McCloud	8/14, 64 yards
South Florida	Rushing	Johnny Ford	6 carries, 70 yards
South Florida	Receiving	Latrell Williams	2 receptions, 48 yards
Notre Dame	Passing	Ian Book	12/19, 144 yards
Notre Dame	Rushing	C'Bo Flemister	13 carries, 127 yards, 1 TD
Notre Dame	Receiving	Tommy Tremble	3 receptions, 61 yards

=== Florida State ===
Florida State at Notre Dame
(rivalry)

Team	1	2	3	4	Total
Seminoles	17	3	6	0	26
• No. 5 Fighting Irish	14	21	7	0	42

- Date: October 10, 2020
- Location: Notre Dame Stadium
  South Bend, IN
- Game start: 7:41 p.m. EDT
- Elapsed time: 3 hours and 20 minutes
- Game attendance: 10,409
- Game weather: Temperature: 64 °F (18 °C) • Weather: Cloudy • Wind: N 8 MPH
- Referee: Riley Johnson
- TV announcers (NBC): Mike Tirico (play–by–play), Tony Dungy (analyst), and Kathryn Tappen (sideline)

Scoring summary
1	12:03	FS	Ryan Fitzgerald 42–yard field goal (4 plays, 8 yards, 2:07)	FS 3–0
1	10:43	ND	Michael Mayer 8–yard pass from Ian Book (Jonathan Doerer kick) (3 plays, 75 yards, 1:20)	ND 7–3
1	06:10	ND	Kyren Williams 46–yard run (Jonathan Doerer kick) (5 plays, 76 yards, 2:19)	ND 14–3
1	02:51	FS	Jordan Travis 4–yard run (Ryan Fitzgerald kick) (3 plays, 19 yards, 1:13)	ND 14–10
1	00:38	FS	Tamorrion Terry 48–yard pass from Jordan Travis (Ryan Fitzgerald kick) (4 plays, 71 yards, 1:13)	FS 17–14
2	12:27	ND	Kyren Williams 1–yard run (Jonathan Doerer kick) (8 plays, 75 yards, 3:11)	ND 21–17
2	05:25	ND	Chris Tyree 45–yard run (Jonathan Doerer kick) (4 plays, 81 yards, 1:50)	ND 28–17
2	01:17	FS	Ryan Fitzgerald 26–yard field goal (13 plays, 67 yards, 4:08)	ND 28–20
2	00:11	ND	Braden Lenzy 6–yard pass from Ian Book (Jonathan Doerer kick) (8 plays, 57 yards, 0:58)	ND 35–20
3	12:25	FS	La'Damian Webb 7–yard run (Tamorrion Terry pass failed) (7 plays, 75 yards, 2:35)	ND 35–26
3	08:40	ND	Ian Book 3–yard run (Jonathan Doerer kick) (8 plays, 86 yards, 3:39)	ND 42–26

Statistics	Florida State	Notre Dame
First downs	18	26
Total yards	405	554
Rushing yards	153	353
Passing yards	252	201
Turnovers	0	4
Time of possession	32:08	27:52

Team	Category	Player	Statistics
Florida State	Passing	Jordan Travis	13/24, 204 yards, 1 TD, 1 INT
Florida State	Rushing	Jordan Travis	19 carries, 96 yards, 1 TD
Florida State	Receiving	Tamorrion Terry	9 receptions, 146 yards, 1 TD
Notre Dame	Passing	Ian Book	16/25, 201 yards, 2 TDs
Notre Dame	Rushing	Kyren Williams	19 carries, 185 yards, 2 TDs
Notre Dame	Receiving	Javon McKinley	5 receptions, 107 yards

=== Louisville ===
Louisville at Notre Dame

Team	1	2	3	4	Total
Cardinals	0	0	7	0	7
• No. 4 Fighting Irish	6	0	6	0	12

- Date: October 17, 2020
- Location: Notre Dame Stadium
  South Bend, IN
- Game start: 2:42 p.m. EDT
- Elapsed time: 2 hours and 52 minutes
- Game attendance: 10,182
- Game weather: Temperature: 58 °F (14 °C) • Weather: Cloudy • Wind: S 20 MPH
- Referee: Mike Roche
- TV announcers (NBC): Mike Tirico (play–by–play), Tony Dungy (analyst), and Kathryn Tappen (sideline)

Scoring summary
1	09:26	ND	Jonathan Doerer 32–yard field goal (12 plays, 61 yards, 5:34)	ND 3–0
1	00:30	ND	Jonathan Doerer 30–yard field goal (15 plays, 76 yards, 7:09)	ND 6–0
3	07:37	UL	Marshon Ford 1–yard pass from Malik Cunningham (Jason Turner kick) (13 plays, 83 yards, 7:16)	UL 7–6
3	03:43	ND	Ian Book 13–yard run (Javon McKinley pass failed) (8 plays, 66 yards, 3:49)	ND 12–7

Statistics	Louisville	Notre Dame
First downs	14	24
Total yards	233	338
Rushing yards	96	232
Passing yards	137	106
Turnovers	0	0
Time of possession	23:45	36:15

Team	Category	Player	Statistics
Louisville	Passing	Malik Cunningham	16/19, 132 yards, 1 TD
Louisville	Rushing	Javian Hawkins	15 carries, 51 yards
Louisville	Receiving	Javian Hawkins	5 receptions, 46 yards
Notre Dame	Passing	Ian Book	11/19, 106 yards
Notre Dame	Rushing	Kyren Williams	25 carries, 127 yards
Notre Dame	Receiving	Ben Skowronek	2 receptions, 28 yards

=== At Pittsburgh ===
Notre Dame at Pittsburgh
(rivalry)

Team	1	2	3	4	Total
• No. 3 Fighting Irish	7	21	17	0	45
Panthers	3	0	0	0	3

- Date: October 24, 2020
- Location: Heinz Field
  Pittsburgh, PA
- Game start: 3:41 p.m. EDT
- Elapsed time: 3 hours and 18 minutes
- Game attendance: 5,451
- Game weather: Temperature: 52 °F (11 °C) • Weather: Cloudy • Wind: NW 7 MPH
- Referee: Duane Heydt
- TV announcers (ABC): Sean McDonough (play–by–play), Todd Blackledge (analyst), Todd McShay (sideline), and Molly McGrath (sideline)

Scoring summary
1	10:08	ND	Ben Skowronek 34–yard pass from Ian Book (Jonathan Doerer kick) (11 plays, 75 yards, 4:52)	ND 7–0
1	07:38	UP	Alex Kessman 45–yard field goal (10 plays, 37 yards, 2:30)	ND 7–3
2	10:37	ND	Ben Skowronek 73–yard pass from Ian Book (Jonathan Doerer kick) (4 plays, 87 yards, 1:29)	ND 14–3
2	01:29	ND	Kyren Williams 2–yard run (Jonathan Doerer kick) (8 plays, 46 yards, 3:42)	ND 21–3
2	00:11	ND	Isaiah Foskey 0–yard blocked punt return (Jonathan Doerer kick)	ND 28–3
3	07:34	ND	Jonathan Doerer 21–yard field goal (14 plays, 72 yards, 6:10)	ND 31–3
3	04:22	ND	Michael Mayer 14–yard pass from Ian Book (Jonathan Doerer kick) (4 plays, 49 yards, 2:01)	ND 38–3
3	02:42	ND	C'Bo Flemister 2–yard run (Jonathan Doerer kick) (4 plays, 35 yards, 1:33)	ND 45–3

Statistics	Notre Dame	Pittsburgh
First downs	28	11
Total yards	434	162
Rushing yards	115	44
Passing yards	319	118
Turnovers	1	3
Time of possession	40:59	19:01

Team	Category	Player	Statistics
Notre Dame	Passing	Ian Book	16/30, 312 yards, 3 TDs
Notre Dame	Rushing	C'Bo Flemister	13 carries, 48 yards, 1 TD
Notre Dame	Receiving	Ben Skowronek	2 receptions, 107 yards, 2 TDs
Pittsburgh	Passing	Joey Yellen	10/27, 101 yards, 3 INTs
Pittsburgh	Rushing	Vincent Davis	8 carries, 28 yards
Pittsburgh	Receiving	Jordan Addison	3 receptions, 40 yards

=== At Georgia Tech ===
Notre Dame at Georgia Tech
(rivalry)

Team	1	2	3	4	Total
• No. 4 Fighting Irish	7	10	7	7	31
Yellow Jackets	0	7	0	6	13

- Date: October 31, 2020
- Location: Bobby Dodd Stadium
  Atlanta, GA
- Game start: 3:41 p.m. EDT
- Elapsed time: 3 hours and 10 minutes
- Game attendance: 11,000
- Game weather: Temperature: 61 °F (16 °C) • Weather: Cool and Sunny • Wind: Breezy
- Referee: Gary Patterson
- TV announcers (ABC): Dave Pasch (play–by–play), Mike Golic (analyst), and Marty Smith (sideline)

Scoring summary
1	06:16	ND	Joe Wilkins Jr. 8–yard pass from Ian Book (Jonathan Doerer kick) (15 plays, 81 yards, 8:38)	ND 7–0
2	14:42	GT	Zamari Walton 93–yard fumble return (Jude Kelley kick)	TIE 7–7
2	10:47	ND	Kyren Williams 2–yard run (Jonathan Doerer kick) (7 plays, 75 yards, 3:48)	ND 14–7
2	01:49	ND	Jonathan Doerer 32–yard field goal (8 plays, 35 yards, 2:10)	ND 17–7
3	10:43	ND	Kyren Williams 4–yard run (Jonathan Doerer kick) (6 plays, 65 yards, 2:56)	ND 24–7
4	12:59	ND	C'Bo Flemister 3–yard run (Jonathan Doerer kick) (9 plays, 74 yards, 4:32)	ND 31–7
4	07:15	GT	Jordan Mason 1–yard run (Adonicas Sanders rush failed) (8 plays, 69 yards, 2:42)	ND 31–13

Statistics	Notre Dame	Georgia Tech
First downs	24	17
Total yards	426	238
Rushing yards	227	88
Passing yards	199	150
Turnovers	2	4
Time of possession	36:54	23:06

Team	Category	Player	Statistics
Notre Dame	Passing	Ian Book	18/26, 199 yards, 1 TD
Notre Dame	Rushing	Kyren Williams	15 carries, 76 yards, 2 TDs
Notre Dame	Receiving	Javon McKinley	5 receptions, 93 yards
Georgia Tech	Passing	Jeff Sims	15/26, 150 yards
Georgia Tech	Rushing	Jahmyr Gibbs	14 carries, 61 yards
Georgia Tech	Receiving	Jahmyr Gibbs	5 receptions, 49 yards

=== Clemson ===
Clemson at Notre Dame
(College GameDay)

Team	1	2	3	4	OT	2OT	Total
No. 1 Tigers	7	6	10	10	7	0	40
• No. 4 Fighting Irish	10	13	0	10	7	7	47

- Date: November 7, 2020
- Location: Notre Dame Stadium
  South Bend, IN
- Game start: 7:35 p.m. EST
- Elapsed time: 4 hours and 8 minutes
- Game attendance: 11,011
- Game weather: Temperature: 61 °F (16 °C) • Weather: Cloudy • Wind: SE 6 MPH
- Referee: Jeff Heaser
- TV announcers (NBC/USA): Mike Tirico (play–by–play), Tony Dungy (analyst), Kathryn Tappen (sideline), and Jac Collinsworth (sideline)

Scoring summary
1	14:27	ND	Kyren Williams 65–yard run (Jonathan Doerer kick) (1 play, 75 yards, 0:33)	ND 7–0
1	05:55	ND	Jonathan Doerer 24–yard field goal (10 plays, 49 yards, 6:24)	ND 10–0
1	04:11	CU	Cornell Powell 53–yard pass from DJ Uiagalelei (B.T. Potter kick) (4 plays, 75 yards, 1:44)	ND 10–7
2	13:09	ND	Jonathan Doerer 27–yard field goal (13 plays, 66 yards, 6:02)	ND 13–7
2	08:32	CU	B.T. Potter 25–yard field goal (11 plays, 80 yards, 4:32)	ND 13–10
2	05:53	ND	Jeremiah Owusu-Koramoah 23–yard fumble recovery (Jonathan Doerer kick)	ND 20–10
2	02:41	ND	Jonathan Doerer 45–yard field goal (4 plays, –2 yards, 2:25)	ND 23–10
2	01:09	CU	B.T. Potter 45–yard field goal (6 plays, 47 yards, 1:32)	ND 23–13
3	12:15	CU	B.T. Potter 46–yard field goal (9 plays, 36 yards, 2:45)	ND 23–16
3	04:12	CU	Davis Allen 10–yard pass from D.J. Uiagalelei (B.T. Potter kick) (13 plays, 60 yards, 6:29)	TIE 23–23
4	11:37	ND	Jonathan Doerer 44–yard field goal (7 plays, 31 yards, 3:12)	ND 26–23
4	09:42	CU	B.T. Potter 30–yard field goal (5 plays, 58 yards, 1:49)	TIE 26–26
4	03:33	CU	Travis Etienne 3–yard run (B.T. Potter kick) (12 plays, 74 yards, 5:41)	CU 33–26
4	00:22	ND	Avery Davis 4–yard pass from Ian Book (Jonathan Doerer kick) (8 plays, 91 yards, 1:26)	TIE 33–33
OT	15:00	CU	D.J. Uiagalelei 1–yard run (B.T. Potter kick) (2 plays, 25 yards, 0:00)	CU 40–33
OT	15:00	ND	Kyren Williams 3–yard run (Jonathan Doerer kick) (4 plays, 25 yards, 0:00)	TIE 40–40
2OT	15:00	ND	Kyren Williams 3–yard run (Jonathan Doerer kick) (6 plays, 25 yards, 0:00)	ND 47–40

Statistics	Clemson	Notre Dame
First downs	22	22
Total yards	473	518
Rushing yards	34	208
Passing yards	439	310
Turnovers	6	2
Time of possession	29:38	30:22

Team	Category	Player	Statistics
Clemson	Passing	DJ Uiagalelei	29/44, 439 yards, 2 TDs
Clemson	Rushing	Travis Etienne	18 carries, 28 yards, 1 TD
Clemson	Receiving	Amari Rodgers	8 receptions, 134 yards
Notre Dame	Passing	Ian Book	22/39, 310 yards, 1 TD
Notre Dame	Rushing	Kyren Williams	23 carries, 140 yards, 3 TDs
Notre Dame	Receiving	Javon McKinley	5 receptions, 102 yards

==== Summary ====
Notre Dame opened things up very quickly in the game with a strong first quarter. After a holding penalty on Clemson, Kyren Williams busted off a 65-yard touchdown run that eclipsed the total points scored by Notre Dame in the previous matchup against Clemson and put Notre Dame up 7–0. Following a Clemson punt, Notre Dame would put together a ten play drive that led to Jonathan Doerer field goal of 24 yards that put Notre Dame up 10–0. Clemson would waste no time on the following possession as they scored on a 53-yard pass from DJ Uiagalelei to Cornell Powell on a 4 play drive that took less than two minutes of game time to put Clemson on the board as they trailed 7–10. The second quarter would also favor Notre Dame as they would put together another drive that had double digit plays with a thirteen play drive that led to Doerer making another field goal of 27 yards to extend Notre Dame's lead to 13–7. Clemson would match Notre Dame with a drive that would also feature a double digit number of plays. In an eleven play drive by Clemson, it would end with B.T. Potter kicking a field goal of 25 yards to put Clemson within three points again as the score was 10–13 in favor of Notre Dame. Following a Notre Dame possession that ended in a punt, Clemson would fumble the ball that was recovered by Jeremiah Owusu-Koramoah for a touchdown and gave Notre Dame a 20–10 lead. On the following possession, Clemson would once again fumble the ball, but Notre Dame stalled on the next drive that led to Doerer kicking his third field goal of the night at 45 yards to give Notre Dame a 23–10 lead. Clemson responded with a 45-yard field goal of their own as B.T. Potter kicked his second of the night just before halftime to put Clemson 13–23.

Clemson would dominate the third quarter with all ten of the points scored by Clemson. Clemson scored a field goal of 46 yards by B.T. Potter on the opening drive to pull Clemson within a touchdown with a score of 16–23. Following a three-and-out by Notre Dame, Clemson took 13 plays to even the score at 23–23 with Davis Allen catching a 10-yard pass from Uiagalelei. The fourth quarter would see Jonathan Doerer kick his fourth and final field goal of the night with a 44 yarder that allowed Notre Dame to regain the lead at 26–23. Clemson would quickly match that with B.T. Potter also kicking his fourth and final field goal of the night with a 30 yarder to tie the game again. Notre Dame would stall with a three-and-out that gave the ball back to Clemson who took twelve plays to gain their first lead of the game on a Travis Etienne run of 3 yards that put Clemson up 33–26. Notre Dame would turn the ball over on downs and then force Clemson into a three-and-out to get the ball back with 1:48 remaining in regulation. Notre Dame would embark on an 8 play, 91-yard drive that featured multiple first downs and a deep pass to Avery Davis to set up a first and goal situation. On third and goal, Ian Book would throw a 4-yard pass to Davis to tie the game at 33–33 with 22 seconds remaining.

In the first overtime, it took Clemson only 2 plays to regain the lead on a 1-yard run by Uiagalelei to make it 40–33. Notre Dame would respond on twice the number of plays with a 3-yard run by Kyren Williams to tie it at 40–40 once again. Notre Dame opened the second overtime with a 6 play drive that saw Kyren Williams score on another 3-yard run to put Notre Dame up for good at 47–40 with Williams having his third touchdown of the game. Clemson would get one more chance following that score, but were not able to convert and Notre Dame would gain a victory of 47–40 in double overtime.

=== At Boston College ===
Notre Dame at Boston College
(Holy War)

Team	1	2	3	4	Total
• No. 2 Fighting Irish	10	21	7	7	45
Eagles	10	6	7	8	31

- Date: November 14, 2020
- Location: Alumni Stadium
  Chestnut Hill, MA
- Game start: 3:36 p.m. EST
- Elapsed time: 3 hours and 33 minutes
- Game attendance: 0
- Game weather: Temperature: 46 °F (8 °C) • Weather: Partly Cloudy • Wind: W 14 MPH
- Referee: Mike Roche
- TV announcers (ABC): Sean McDonough (play–by–play), Todd Blackledge (analyst), Todd McShay (sideline), and Molly McGrath (sideline)

Scoring summary
1	09:39	ND	Jonathan Doerer 23–yard field goal (13 plays, 70 yards, 5:21)	ND 3–0
1	05:03	BC	Zay Flowers 4–yard pass from Phil Jurkovec (Aaron Boumerhi kick) (10 plays, 80 yards, 4:30)	BC 7–3
1	03:56	BC	Aaron Boumerhi 41–yard field goal (4 plays, –6 yards, 0:56)	BC 10–3
1	00:11	ND	Ben Skowronek 10–yard pass from Ian Book (Jonathan Doerer kick) (8 plays, 77 yards, 3:39)	TIE 10–10
2	12:41	BC	Aaron Boumerhi 31–yard field goal (9 plays, 44 yards, 2:25)	BC 13–10
2	10:24	ND	C'Bo Flemister 2–yard run (Jonathan Doerer kick) (6 plays, 75 yards, 2:13)	ND 17–13
2	05:43	ND	Ben Skowronek 13–yard pass from Ian Book (Jonathan Doerer kick) (7 plays, 50 yards, 3:32)	ND 24–13
2	03:12	BC	Aaron Boumerhi 35–yard field goal (6 plays, 57 yards, 2:31)	ND 24–16
2	00:04	ND	Ben Skowronek 7–yard pass from Ian Book (Jonathan Doerer kick) (9 plays, 49 yards, 2:05)	ND 31–16
3	06:34	ND	C'Bo Flemister 1–yard run (Jonathan Doerer kick) (4 plays, 43 yards, 1:57)	ND 38–16
3	00:35	BC	David Bailey 3–yard run (Aaron Boumerhi kick) (12 plays, 80 yards, 5:59)	ND 38–23
4	12:19	ND	Ian Book 6–yard run (Jonathan Doerer kick) (7 plays, 70 yards, 3:10)	ND 45–23
4	04:09	BC	Hunter Long 8–yard pass from Phil Jurkovec (Travis Levy rush) (6 plays, 70 yards, 1:28)	ND 45–31

Statistics	Notre Dame	Boston College
First downs	29	22
Total yards	561	357
Rushing yards	278	85
Passing yards	283	272
Turnovers	6	2
Time of possession	34:27	25:33

Team	Category	Player	Statistics
Notre Dame	Passing	Ian Book	20/27, 283 yards, 3 TDs
Notre Dame	Rushing	Ian Book	10 carries, 85 yards, 1 TD
Notre Dame	Receiving	Avery Davis	2 receptions, 70 yards
Boston College	Passing	Phil Jurkovec	18/40, 272 yards, 2 TDs, 1 INT
Boston College	Rushing	Travis Levy	9 carries, 51 yards
Boston College	Receiving	Jaelen Gill	5 receptions, 105 yards

=== At North Carolina ===
Notre Dame at North Carolina
(rivalry)

Team	1	2	3	4	Total
• No. 2 Fighting Irish	14	3	7	7	31
No. 19 Tar Heels	14	3	0	0	17

- Date: November 27, 2020
- Location: Kenan Memorial Stadium
  Chapel Hill, NC
- Game start: 3:41 p.m. EST
- Elapsed time: 3 hours and 13 minutes
- Game attendance: 3,535
- Game weather: Temperature: 65 °F (18 °C) • Weather: Clear • Wind: NNE 5 MPH
- Referee: Duane Heydt
- TV announcers (ABC): Chris Fowler (play–by–play), Kirk Herbstreit (analyst), and Katie George (sideline)

Scoring summary
1	09:56	NC	Emery Simmons 6–yard pass from Sam Howell (Grayson Atkins kick) (7 plays, 50 yards, 2:54)	NC 7–0
1	05:19	ND	Kyren Williams 2–yard run (Jonathan Doerer kick) (9 plays, 75 yards, 4:37)	TIE 7–7
1	02:59	NC	Sam Howell 1–yard run (Grayson Atkins kick) (7 plays, 75 yards, 2:20)	NC 14–7
1	01:05	ND	Kyren Williams 4–yard pass from Ian Book (Jonathan Doerer kick) (4 plays, 82 yards, 1:50)	TIE 14–14
2	01:10	NC	Grayson Atkins 42–yard field goal (12 plays, 72 yards, 4:40)	NC 17–14
2	00:00	ND	Jonathan Doerer 32–yard field goal (7 plays, 61 yards, 1:10)	TIE 17–17
3	07:05	ND	Ben Skowronek 13–yard run (Jonathan Doerer kick) (13 plays, 97 yards, 5:22)	ND 24–17
4	01:20	ND	Kyren Williams 1–yard run (Jonathan Doerer kick) (8 plays, 89 yards, 4:32)	ND 31–17

Statistics	Notre Dame	North Carolina
First downs	25	14
Total yards	478	298
Rushing yards	199	87
Passing yards	279	211
Turnovers	1	0
Time of possession	35:04	24:56

Team	Category	Player	Statistics
Notre Dame	Passing	Ian Book	23/33, 279 yards, 1 TD
Notre Dame	Rushing	Kyren Williams	23 carries, 124 yards, 2 TDs
Notre Dame	Receiving	Javon McKinley	6 receptions, 135 yards
North Carolina	Passing	Sam Howell	17/27, 211 yards, 1 TD
North Carolina	Rushing	Michael Carter	8 carries, 57 yards
North Carolina	Receiving	Dyami Brown	4 receptions, 84 yards

=== Syracuse ===
Syracuse at Notre Dame

Team	1	2	3	4	Total
Orange	0	7	7	7	21
• No. 2 Fighting Irish	3	21	14	7	45

- Date: December 5, 2020
- Location: Notre Dame Stadium
  South Bend, IN
- Game start: 2:41 p.m. EST
- Elapsed time: 3 hours and 22 minutes
- Game attendance: 6,831
- Game weather: Temperature: 37 °F (3 °C) • Weather: Overcast • Wind: NE 10 MPH
- Referee: Stuart Mullins
- TV announcers (NBC): Mike Tirico (play–by–play), Tony Dungy (analyst), and Kathryn Tappen (sideline)

Scoring summary
1	09:32	ND	Jonathan Doerer 25–yard field goal (12 plays, 73 yards, 5:28)	ND 3–0
2	09:55	SU	Anthony Queeley 18–yard pass from Rex Culpepper (Andre Szmyt kick) (10 plays, 62 yards, 4:07)	SU 7–3
2	03:18	ND	Ian Book 28–yard run (Jonathan Doerer kick) (5 plays, 72 yards, 2:18)	ND 10–7
2	01:30	ND	Javon McKinley 21–yard pass from Ian Book (Jonathan Doerer kick) (1 play, 21 yards, 0:08)	ND 17–7
2	00:06	ND	Javon McKinley 28–yard pass from Ian Book (Jonathan Doerer kick) (6 plays, 68 yards, 0:32)	ND 24–7
3	11:20	SU	Sean Tucker 40–yard run (Andre Szmyt kick) (5 plays, 57 yards, 2:14)	ND 24–14
3	06:32	ND	Ian Book 17–yard run (Jonathan Doerer kick) (8 plays, 53 yards, 3:23)	ND 31–14
3	01:07	ND	Javon McKinley 26–yard pass from Ian Book (Jonathan Doerer kick) (3 plays, 68 yards, 1:03)	ND 38–14
4	06:25	ND	Chris Tyree 94–yard run (Jonathan Doerer kick) (2 plays, 87 yards, 0:52)	ND 45–14
4	05:33	SU	Cooper Lutz 80–yard run (Andre Szmyt kick) (2 plays, 81 yards, 0:52)	ND 45–21

Statistics	Syracuse	Notre Dame
First downs	15	26
Total yards	414	568
Rushing yards	229	283
Passing yards	185	285
Turnovers	7	2
Time of possession	26:10	33:50

Team	Category	Player	Statistics
Syracuse	Passing	Rex Culpepper	18/29, 185 yards, 1 TD, 1 INT
Syracuse	Rushing	Sean Tucker	24 carries, 113 yards, 1 TD
Syracuse	Receiving	Taj Harris	8 receptions, 69 yards
Notre Dame	Passing	Ian Book	24/37, 285 yards, 3 TDs, 1 INT
Notre Dame	Rushing	Kyren Williams	20 carries, 110 yards
Notre Dame	Receiving	Javon McKinley	7 receptions, 111 yards, 3 TDs

=== Vs. Clemson (ACC Championship) ===
Clemson vs. Notre Dame
(ACC Championship Game/College GameDay)

Team	1	2	3	4	Total
• No. 3 Tigers	7	17	7	3	34
No. 2 Fighting Irish	3	0	0	7	10

- Date: December 19, 2020
- Location: Bank of America Stadium
  Charlotte, NC
- Game start: 4:08 p.m. EST
- Elapsed time: 3 hours and 12 minutes
- Game attendance: 5,240
- Game weather: Temperature:48 °F (9 °C) • Weather: Partly Cloudy • Wind: SSE 4 MPH
- Referee: Jeff Heaser
- TV announcers (ABC): Chris Fowler (play–by–play), Kirk Herbstreit (analyst), and Maria Taylor (sideline)

Scoring summary
1	08:16	ND	Jonathan Doerer 51–yard field goal (11 plays, 46 yards, 6:44)	ND 3–0
1	00:41	CU	Amari Rodgers 67–yard pass from Trevor Lawrence (B.T. Potter kick) (3 plays, 80 yards, 1:01)	CU 7–3
2	09:24	CU	E.J. Williams 33–yard pass from Trevor Lawrence (B.T. Potter kick) (6 plays, 72 yards, 2:44)	CU 14–3
2	04:28	CU	B.T. Potter 27–yard field goal (8 plays, 63 yards, 2:37)	CU 17–3
2	00:21	CU	Travis Etienne 44–yard run (B.T. Potter kick) (10 plays, 88 yards, 1:49)	CU 24–3
3	03:43	CU	Trevor Lawrence 34–yard run (B.T. Potter kick) (8 plays, 83 yards, 2:35)	CU 31–3
4	10:31	CU	B.T. Potter 37–yard field goal (12 plays, 66 yards, 6:22)	CU 34–3
4	08:09	ND	Chris Tyree 21–yard run (Jonathan Doerer kick) (7 plays, 75 yards, 2:22)	CU 34–10

Statistics	Clemson	Notre Dame
First downs	23	18
Total yards	541	263
Rushing yards	219	44
Passing yards	322	219
Turnovers	0	4
Time of possession	28:08	31:52

Team	Category	Player	Statistics
Clemson	Passing	Trevor Lawrence	25/36, 322 yards, 2 TDs, 1 INT
Clemson	Rushing	Travis Etienne	10 carries, 124 yards, 1 TD
Clemson	Receiving	Amari Rodgers	8 receptions, 121 yards, 1 TD
Notre Dame	Passing	Ian Book	20/28, 219 yards
Notre Dame	Rushing	Kyren Williams	15 carries, 50 yards
Notre Dame	Receiving	Michael Mayer	5 receptions, 51 yards

=== Vs. Alabama (Rose Bowl) ===
Notre Dame vs. Alabama
(Rose Bowl – CFP Semifinal/College GameDay)

Team	1	2	3	4	Total
No. 4 Fighting Irish	0	7	0	7	14
• No. 1 Alabama	14	7	7	3	31

- Date: January 1, 2021
- Location: AT&T Stadium
  Arlington, TX
- Game start: 3:20 p.m. CST
- Elapsed time: 3 hours and 13 minutes
- Game attendance: 18,373
- Game weather: Temperature: 72 °F (22 °C) • Weather: Indoors • Wind: N/A
- Referee: John O'Neill
- TV announcers (ESPN/ESPN Radio): Sean McDonough (play–by–play), Todd Blackledge (analyst), Todd McShay (sideline), and Allison Williams (sideline)/Joe Tessitore (play-by-play), Andre Ware (analyst), and Holly Rowe (sideline)

Scoring summary
1	10:14	UA	DeVonta Smith 26–yard pass from Mac Jones (Will Reichard kick) (7 plays, 79 yards, 2:36)	UA 7–0
1	04:19	UA	Jahleel Billingsley 12–yard pass from Mac Jones (Will Reichard kick) (5 plays, 97 yards, 2:11)	UA 14–0
2	11:16	ND	Kyren Williams 1–yard run (Jonathan Doerer kick) (15 plays, 75 yards, 8:03)	UA 14–7
2	08:49	UA	DeVonta Smith 34–yard pass from Mac Jones (Will Reichard kick) (6 plays, 84 yards, 2:21)	UA 21–7
3	04:58	UA	DeVonta Smith 7–yard pass from Mac Jones (Will Reichard kick) (5 plays, 62 yards, 2:29)	UA 28–7
4	12:45	UA	Will Reichard 41–yard field goal (10 plays, 47 yards, 4:20)	UA 31–7
4	00:56	ND	Ian Book 1–yard run (Jonathan Doerer kick) (14 plays, 80 yards, 4:36)	UA 31–14

Statistics	Notre Dame	Alabama
First downs	24	24
Total yards	375	437
Rushing yards	139	140
Passing yards	236	297
Turnovers	2	0
Time of possession	33:43	26:17

Team	Category	Player	Statistics
Notre Dame	Passing	Ian Book	27/39, 229 yards, 1 INT
Notre Dame	Rushing	Kyren Williams	16 carries, 64 yards, 1 TD
Notre Dame	Receiving	Kyren Williams	8 receptions, 31 yards
Alabama	Passing	Mac Jones	25/30, 297 yards, 4 TDs
Alabama	Rushing	Najee Harris	15 carries, 125 yards
Alabama	Receiving	DeVonta Smith	7 receptions, 130 yards, 3 TDs

== Players drafted into the NFL ==
Round	Pick	Player	Position	NFL Club
2	42	Liam Eichenberg	OT	Miami Dolphins
2	48	Aaron Banks	OG	San Francisco 49ers
2	52	Jeremiah Owusu-Koramoah	ILB	Cleveland Browns
3	83	Tommy Tremble	TE	Carolina Panthers
3	95	Robert Hainsey	OT	Tampa Bay Buccaneers
4	133	Ian Book	QB	New Orleans Saints
5	171	Daelin Hayes	DE	Baltimore Ravens
5	182	Adetokunbo Ogundeji	DE	Atlanta Falcons
7	249	Ben Skowronek	WR	Los Angeles Rams
