= Ade Ogundeji =

American football player (born 1998)

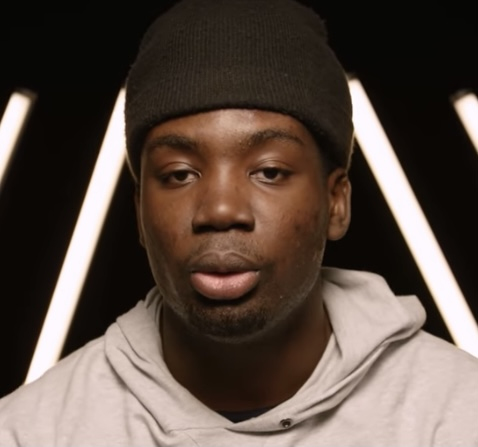
- Ogundeji in 2021

Vanderbilt Commodores
- Title: Assistant defensive line coach

Personal information
- Born: October 9, 1998 (age 28); West Bloomfield, Michigan, U.S.
- Listed height: 6 ft 4 in (1.93 m)
- Listed weight: 268 lb (122 kg)

Career information
- High school: Walled Lake Central (Commerce Township, Michigan)
- College: Notre Dame (2016–2020)
- NFL draft: 2021: 5th round, 182nd overall pick

Career history

Playing
- Atlanta Falcons (2021–2023); Pittsburgh Steelers (2024)

Coaching
- Vanderbilt (2026–present) Assistant defensive line coach

Career NFL statistics
- Total tackles: 75
- Sacks: 3.0
- Fumble recoveries: 1
- Pass deflections: 2
- Stats at Pro Football Reference

Adetokunbo Ademola Ogundeji (born October 9, 1998) is an American former professional football player who was a linebacker in the National Football League (NFL). He played college football for the Notre Dame Fighting Irish. He is currently the assistant defensive line coach for the Vanderbilt Commodores.

== Early life ==
Ogundeji grew up in West Bloomfield, Michigan. He did not play football until his freshman year at Walled Lake Central High School. He originally committed to play at Western Michigan. As a junior, he had 68 tackles, nine sacks, 17 pass breakups and four fumble recoveries and ultimately de-committed from Western Michigan after being more heavily recruited. Ogundeji ultimately signed to play at Notre Dame. His senior season was cut short due to a knee injury.

== College career ==
Ogundeji played college football for the Notre Dame Fighting Irish from 2016 to 2020. He spent his freshman season on the scout team and did not appear in any games and played sparingly as a sophomore. He started to receive significant playing time as a junior during the 2018 season and finished the year with 25 total tackles, three tackles for loss, 1.5 sacks and two forced fumbles. As a senior in 2019, Ogundeji had 34 tackles, seven tackles for loss, 4.5 sacks, three forced fumbles and one fumble recovery after playing in all 13 of the Fighting Irish's games. On September 28, 2019, Ogundeji returned a fumble for a touchdown against Virginia. Ogundeji opted to return for a fifth season in 2020. He had seven sacks in his final season.

== Professional career ==
Pre-draft measurables
Height	Weight	Arm length	Hand span	40-yard dash	10-yard split	20-yard split	20-yard shuttle	Three-cone drill	Vertical jump	Broad jump	Bench press
6 ft 4 1/2 in (1.94 m)	260 lb (118 kg)	35 1/2 in (0.90 m)	9 1/2 in (0.24 m)	4.78 s	1.71 s	2.76 s	4.65 s	7.19 s	32.0 in (0.81 m)	10 ft 0 in (3.05 m)	22 reps
All values from Pro Day

=== Atlanta Falcons ===
Ogundeji was selected by the Atlanta Falcons in the fifth round with the 182nd overall pick of the 2021 NFL draft. He signed his four-year rookie contract with Atlanta on June 15, 2021. During the 2021 season, Ogundeji appeared in 16 games, making 11 starts.

Ogundeji started 16 games during the 2022 season.

On August 15, 2023, Ogundeji was placed on injured reserve.

Ogundeji was released by the Falcons on May 16, 2024.

=== Pittsburgh Steelers ===
On August 29, 2024, Ogundeji was signed to the Pittsburgh Steelers practice squad. On October 12, 2024, Ogundeji was promoted to the active roster. He was released on December 17.

In July 2025, Ogundeji announced his retirement.

== Career statistics ==
=== NFL ===
Year	Team	Games		Tackles					Interceptions						Fumbles		
Year	Team	GP	GS	Total	Solo	Ast	Sck	Sfty	PD	Int	Yds	Avg	Lng	TD	FF	FR	TD
2021	ATL	16	11	33	18	15	1.0	0	1	0	0	0.0	0	0	0	1	0
2022	ATL	16	16	42	19	23	2.0	0	0	0	0	0.0	0	0	0	0	0
2024	PIT	3	0	0	0	0	0.0	0	1	0	0	0.0	0	0	0	0	0
Career		35	27	75	37	38	3.0	0	2	0	0	0.0	0	0	0	1	0

=== College ===
Year	Team	Games		Tackles				Interceptions				Fumbles		
Year	Team	GP	GS	Total	Solo	Ast	Sack	PD	Int	Yds	TD	FF	FR	TD
2016	Notre Dame	0	0	DNP										
2017	Notre Dame	5	0	0	0	0	0.0	0	0	0	0	0	0	0
2018	Notre Dame	13	0	23	12	11	1.5	1	0	0	0	2	0	0
2019	Notre Dame	13	1	34	17	17	4.5	0	0	0	0	3	1	1
2020	Notre Dame	12	12	23	15	8	7.0	0	0	0	0	1	1	0
Career		43	13	80	44	36	13.0	1	0	0	0	6	2	1

== Coaching career ==
Ogundeji was hired as the assistant defensive line coach at Vanderbilt.

== Personal life ==
He is of Nigerian descent through his father.
