= Javon McKinley =

American football player (born 1998)

Profile
- Position: Wide receiver

Personal information
- Born: April 10, 1998 (age 28); Corona, California, U.S.
- Listed height: 6 ft 2 in (1.88 m)
- Listed weight: 215 lb (98 kg)

Career information
- High school: Centennial (Corona, California)
- College: Notre Dame (2016–2020)
- NFL draft: 2021: undrafted

Career history
- Detroit Lions (2021)*; Pittsburgh Steelers (2022)*
- * Offseason or practice squad member only
- Stats at Pro Football Reference

Javon Jonathan McKinley (born April 10, 1998) is an American former professional football wide receiver. He played college football at Notre Dame.

== Early life ==
McKinley grew up in Corona, California and attended Centennial High School. He was named the Los Angeles Times All-Area Back of the Year and The Press-Enterprise All-Area Offensive Player of the Year after 97 receptions for 2,062 yards and 25 touchdowns in his junior season. As a senior, McKinley caught 56 passes for 1,173 yards and 13 touchdowns and played in the All-America Bowl.

== College career ==
McKinley played in six games as a freshman before breaking his left fibula in practice. The injury caused him to miss the entirety of his sophomore season. McKinley played in four games as a junior. Shortly after the end of the season, McKinley was suspended from the team after being charged with three misdemeanors, but was reinstated after entering a pretrial diversion program.

In 2019, McKinley saw his first significant playing time and finished the season with 11 receptions for 268 yards and four touchdowns. McKinley utilized a fifth year of eligibility and caught 42 passes for 717 yards and three touchdowns and was named honorable mention All-Atlantic Coast Conference.

=== Statistics ===
Year	Team	Games		Receiving				
Year	Team	GP	GS	Rec	Yds	Avg	Lng	TD
2016	Notre Dame	6	0	0	0	0.0	0	0
2017	Notre Dame	0	0	DNP				
2018	Notre Dame	4	0	0	0	0.0	0	0
2019	Notre Dame	9	2	11	268	24.4	65	4
2020	Notre Dame	12	12	42	717	17.1	53	3
Career		31	14	53	985	18.6	65	7

== Professional career ==
Pre-draft measurables
Height	Weight	Arm length	Hand span	40-yard dash	10-yard split	20-yard split	20-yard shuttle	Three-cone drill	Vertical jump	Bench press
6 ft 1 3/4 in (1.87 m)	215 lb (98 kg)	33 in (0.84 m)	9 3/4 in (0.25 m)	4.60 s	1.57 s	2.57 s	4.40 s	7.05 s	32.5 in (0.83 m)	20 reps
All values from Pro Day

=== Detroit Lions ===
McKinley signed with the Detroit Lions as an undrafted free agent after the 2021 NFL draft. He was waived on August 31, 2021 and re-signed to the practice squad the next day. He signed a reserve/future contract with the Lions on January 10, 2022. He was waived on May 12, 2022.

=== Pittsburgh Steelers ===
On August 1, 2022, he signed a one-year contract with the Pittsburgh Steelers. On August 11, 2022, he was waived/injured. He cleared waivers and was placed on injured reserve the next day. On August 16, he was waived with an injury settlement.

On December 2, 2022, the Denver Broncos hosted McKinley for a workout alongside Joshua Dobbs, Malik Taylor, and Connor Wedington.
