= Jeremiah Owusu-Koramoah =

American football player (born 1999)

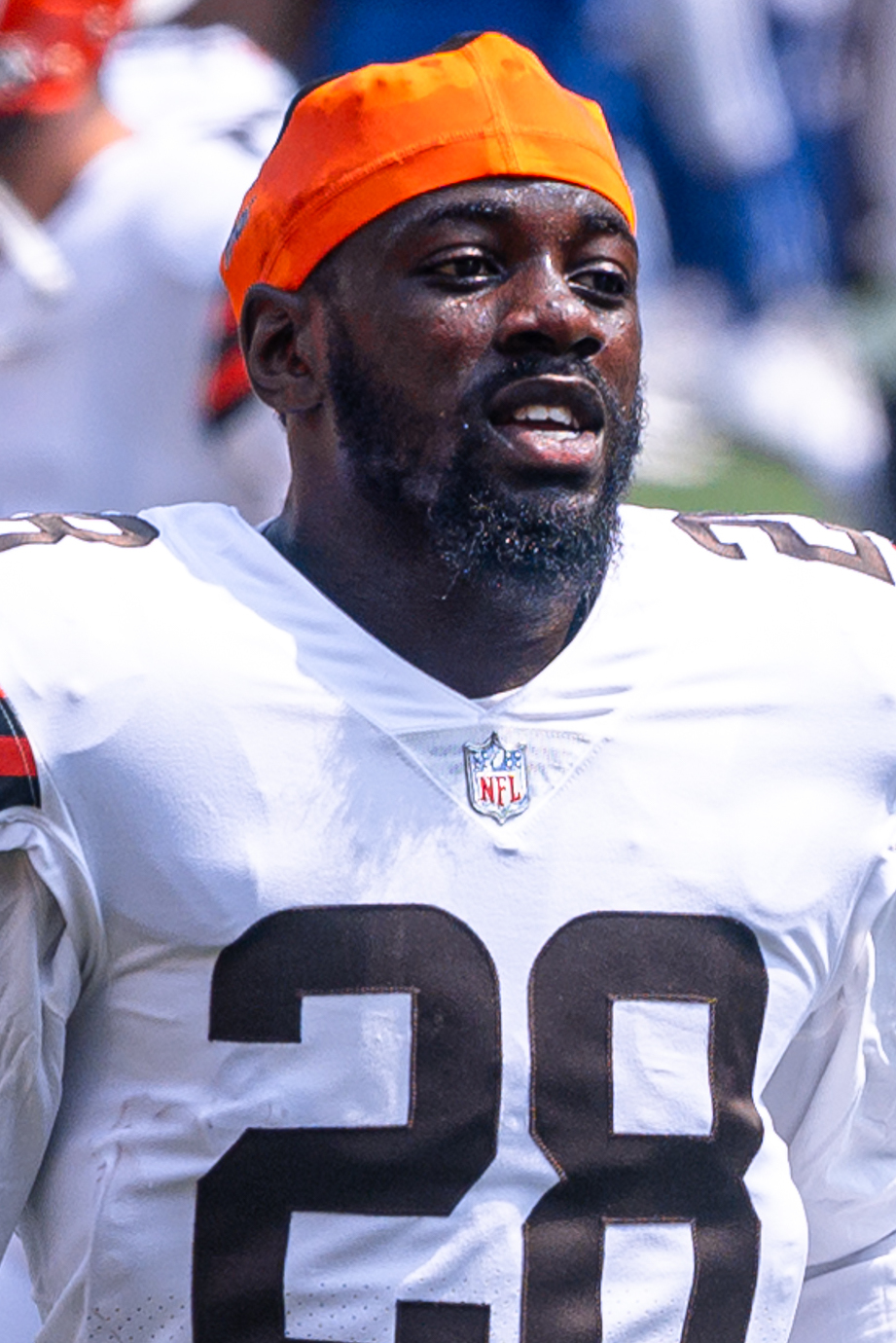
- Owusu-Koramoah with the Browns in 2021

No. 6 – Cleveland Browns
- Position: Linebacker
- Roster status: Physically unable to perform

Personal information
- Born: November 4, 1999 (age 27); Hampton, Virginia, U.S.
- Listed height: 6 ft 2 in (1.88 m)
- Listed weight: 221 lb (100 kg)

Career information
- High school: Bethel (Hampton)
- College: Notre Dame (2017–2020)
- NFL draft: 2021: 2nd round, 52nd overall pick

Career history
- Cleveland Browns (2021–present)

Awards and highlights
- Pro Bowl (2023); PFWA All-Rookie Team (2021); Butkus Award (2020); ACC Defensive Player of the Year (2020); Unanimous All-American (2020); First-team All-ACC (2020)

Career NFL statistics as of 2025
- Total tackles: 308
- Sacks: 8
- Forced fumbles: 6
- Pass deflections: 17
- Interceptions: 3
- Stats at Pro Football Reference

Jeremiah Ernest Owusu-Koramoah Yaw (born November 4, 1999) is an American professional football linebacker for the Cleveland Browns of the National Football League (NFL). He played college football for the Notre Dame Fighting Irish, where he won the Butkus Award and was named the ACC Defensive Player of the Year and a unanimous All-American as a senior in 2020. Owusu-Koramoah was selected by the Browns in the second round of the 2021 NFL draft, and was named a Pro Bowler in 2023.

== Early life ==
Owusu-Koramoah grew up in Hampton, Virginia, and attended Bethel High School. He is of Ghanaian descent through his father Andrew, who met his wife Beverly in England, before moving to Virginia in 1998. Owusu-Koramoah was rated a three-star recruit and initially committed to play college football at the University of Virginia in 2016 before decommitting to choose the University of Notre Dame.

== College career ==
Owusu-Koramoah spent his freshman season on the Fighting Irish's scout team and did not appear in any games. He missed most of his sophomore year after breaking his foot in practice after playing in the first two games of the season. Owusu-Koramoah was named a starter going into his junior season and recorded 80 tackles, a team-leading 13.5 tackles for loss, and 5.5 sacks with four passes broken up, two forced fumbles, and two fumble recoveries. He won the Butkus Award as the nation's top linebacker as a senior in 2020, in addition to being named a unanimous All-American and the ACC Defensive Player of the Year.

== Professional career ==
Pre-draft measurables
Height	Weight	Arm length	Hand span	Wingspan	20-yard shuttle	Vertical jump	Broad jump
6 ft 1 1/2 in (1.87 m)	221 lb (100 kg)	33 in (0.84 m)	8 7/8 in (0.23 m)	6 ft 6 1/8 in (1.98 m)	4.15 s	36.5 in (0.93 m)	10 ft 4 in (3.15 m)
All values from Pro Day

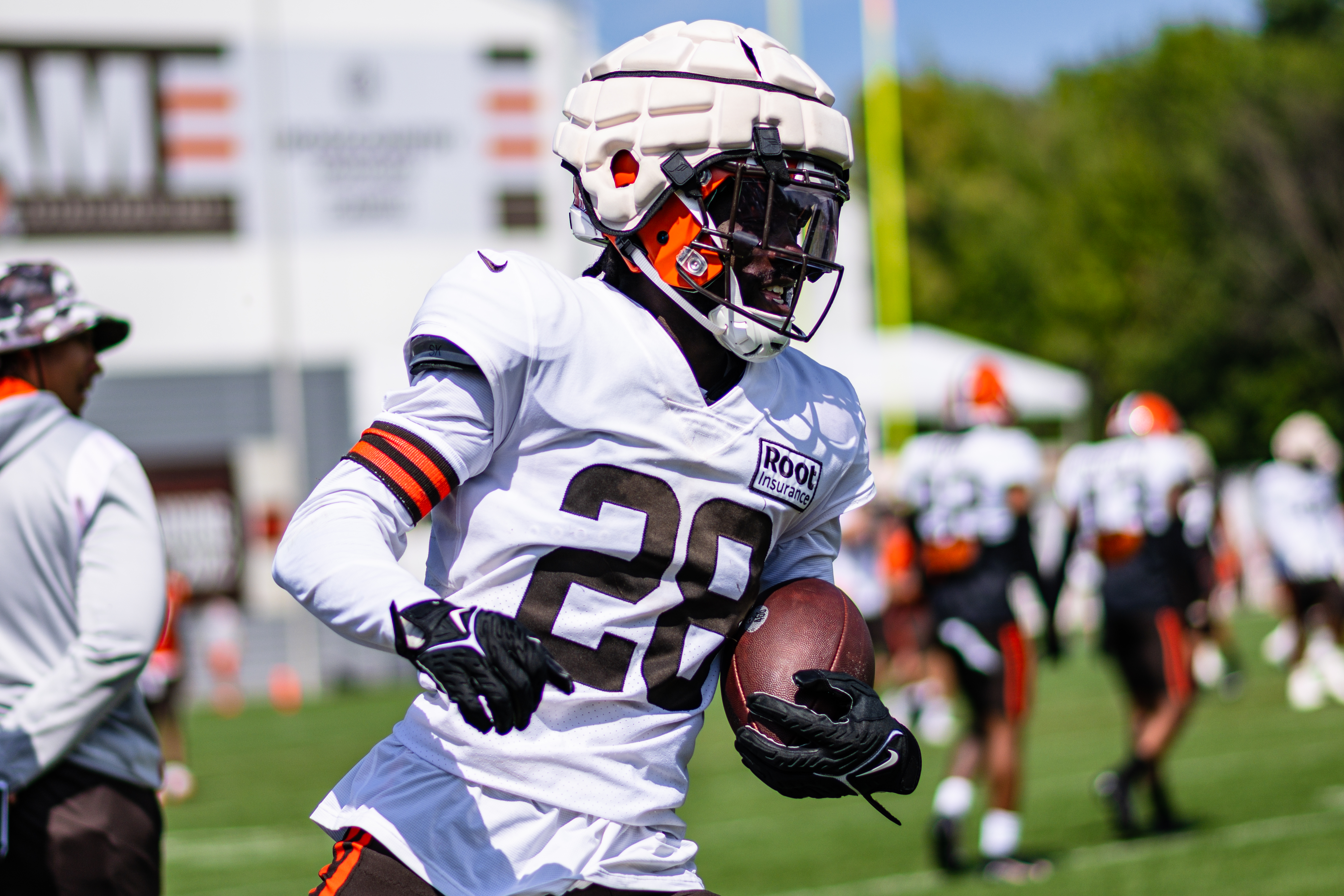
Owusu-Koramoah during the Browns' 2022 training camp

Owusu-Koramoah was selected by the Cleveland Browns in the second round (52nd overall) of the 2021 NFL draft. He signed his four-year rookie contract, worth $6.5 million, on June 6, 2021. He was placed on the team's COVID-19 reserve list at the start of training camp before being activated on August 3. Koramoah recorded his first career sack on Chicago Bears quarterback Justin Fields in Week 3 of the 2021 season. He was placed on injured reserve on October 19, 2021, with an ankle injury. He was activated on November 13. He was placed back on injured reserve on December 13 after suffering a foot injury in Week 14. He was named to the PFWA All-Rookie Team.

On August 14, 2024, Owusu-Koramoah and the Browns agreed to a three–year, $39 million contract extension.

On May 12, 2025, the Browns placed Owusu-Koramoah on the reserve/PUP list due to a neck injury suffered in Week 8 of the 2024 season, making him ineligible to play for the entirety of the 2025 NFL season.

It was reported during the 2026 offseason that Owusu-Koramoah may never play in an NFL game again. On May 8, 2026, Owusu-Koramoah was once again placed on the reserve/PUP list.

== Career statistics ==
=== NFL ===
Year	Team	Games		Tackles					Interceptions						Fumbles	
Year	Team	GP	GS	Comb	Solo	Ast	Sack	Sfty	PD	Int	Yds	Avg	Lng	TD	FF	FR
2021	CLE	14	10	76	49	27	1.5	0	4	0	0	0.0	0	0	2	0
2022	CLE	11	10	70	45	25	0.0	0	4	0	0	0.0	0	0	2	0
2023	CLE	16	13	101	72	29	3.5	0	6	2	8	4.0	8	0	1	0
2024	CLE	8	8	61	39	22	3.0	0	3	1	0	0.0	0	0	1	0
Career		49	41	308	205	103	8.0	0	17	3	8	2.7	8	0	6	0

=== College ===
Year	Team	Games		Tackles				Interceptions				Fumbles		
Year	Team	GP	GS	Total	Solo	Ast	Sack	PD	Int	Yds	TD	FF	FR	TD
2017	Notre Dame	0	0	DNP										
2018	Notre Dame	2	0	0	0	0	0.0	0	0	0	0	0	0	0
2019	Notre Dame	13	13	80	54	26	5.5	4	0	0	0	2	2	0
2020	Notre Dame	12	12	62	42	20	1.5	3	1	0	0	3	2	1
Career		27	25	142	96	46	7.0	7	1	0	0	5	4	1

== Personal life ==
Jeremiah Owusu-Koramoah is of Ghanaian descent. In 2022, he was running a youth football camp in Ghana. Owusu-Koramoah is known for wearing elaborate clothing styles, featuring traditional patterns and materials, in celebration of his Ghanaian heritage.

His older brother, Joshua Emmanuel Owusu-Koramoah, was found dead inside a burned house on April 5, 2022. Two days later, police in Hampton, Virginia said that Ronald Ivan Scott had been charged with one count of murder and one count of arson.

On January 25, 2024, he converted to Islam.
