= Notre Dame–Pittsburgh football rivalry =

American college football rivalry

- Notre Dame Fighting Irish Pittsburgh Panthers
- First meeting: October 30, 1909; Notre Dame, 6–0
- Latest meeting: November 15, 2025; Notre Dame, 37–15
- Next meeting: 2028
- Stadiums: Acrisure Stadium; Pittsburgh, Pennsylvania, U.S. Notre Dame Stadium; Notre Dame, Indiana, U.S.
- Trophy: None

Statistics
- Total meetings: 74
- All-time series: Notre Dame leads, 51–21–1 (.701)
- Largest victory: Notre Dame, 58–0 (1944)
- Longest win streak: Notre Dame, 11 (1964–1974)
- Current win streak: Notre Dame, 5 (2015–present)

Locations of Notre Dame and Pittsburgh

The Notre Dame–Pittsburgh football rivalry is an American college football rivalry between the Notre Dame Fighting Irish and Pittsburgh Panthers. Notre Dame leads the series 52–21–1.

== History ==
This storied series began in 1909, and there have been no more than two consecutive seasons without two teams meeting each other except from 1913 to 1929, 1938 to 1942, and 1979 to 1981. Since 1982, the Panthers and Irish have remained a relative fixture on each other's schedules. Pitt is still Notre Dame's fifth most frequent opponent in program history. Navy, Southern California, Purdue, and Michigan State are the only schools who have played Notre Dame more times.

The series has featured several memorable games. In 1975, Pittsburgh's Tony Dorsett rushed for a school-record 303 yards in a 34–20 victory at Pitt Stadium, still the most yards ever by an Irish opponent. The following year, he rushed for 181 yards on 22 carries in a 31–10 victory as No. 9 Pitt defeated No. 11 Notre Dame in South Bend, Indiana, en route to an undefeated season and a national championship.

In 2012, Notre Dame's Everett Golson sparked a comeback from 14 points down in the fourth quarter to force overtime, and the Irish survived a narrowly missed game-winning field goal attempt by the Panthers in the second OT, to pull out a 29–26 victory in triple OT at home to stay unbeaten en route to a perfect 12–0 regular season. The longest game in Notre Dame history occurred between the two schools in 2008, when Pitt defeated ND 36–33 in four overtimes at Notre Dame after the game was delayed briefly in the first overtime by the sprinklers in one end zone suddenly going off.

The game often gets a large amount of national media attention and most often is televised on major television channels like NBC (which televises all Notre Dame home games), ABC and ESPN.

The November 15, 2025, home game for Pitt, and the most recent contest in the series, was an official sellout. College Game Day was on hand as well for the first time since 2005. Notre Dame dominated most of the contest, en route to a 37–15 win. All-American Running Back Jeremiyah Love carried the ball 23 times for 147 yards and 1 touchdown, including an impressive 56-yard run in the 1st quarter to put Notre Dame up early 7–0.

== Game results ==
Notre Dame victories	Pittsburgh victories	Tie games	Vacated wins (Note: Notre Dame's win in 2012 was vacated as a result of NCAA sanctions against the Notre Dame football program issued on November 22, 2016, after the NCAA found that a student-trainer committed academic misconduct for two football players and provided six other players with impermissible academic extra benefits. The NCAA also rejected Notre Dame's appeal on February 13, 2018. This win is not included in Notre Dame's all-time record, nor is it counted in the series record between the two teams. See Wikipedia:WikiProject College football/Vacated victories for an explanation of how vacated victories are recorded.)

No.	Date	Location	Winner	Score
1	October 30, 1909	Pittsburgh, PA	Notre Dame	6–0
2	November 4, 1911	Pittsburgh, PA	Tie	0–0
3	November 2, 1912	Pittsburgh, PA	Notre Dame	3–0
4	October 25, 1930	Pittsburgh, PA	Notre Dame	35–19
5	October 24, 1931	South Bend, IN	Notre Dame	25–12
6	October 29, 1932	Pittsburgh, PA	Pittsburgh	12–0
7	October 28, 1933	South Bend, IN	Pittsburgh	14–0
8	November 3, 1934	Pittsburgh, PA	Pittsburgh	19–0
9	October 19, 1935	South Bend, IN	Notre Dame	9–6
10	October 24, 1936	Pittsburgh, PA	#9 Pittsburgh	26–0
11	November 6, 1937	South Bend, IN	#3 Pittsburgh	21–6
12	September 25, 1943	Pittsburgh, PA	Notre Dame	41–0
13	September 30, 1944	Pittsburgh, PA	Notre Dame	58–0
14	October 20, 1945	Pittsburgh, PA	#3 Notre Dame	39–9
15	October 5, 1946	South Bend, IN	Notre Dame	33–0
16	October 4, 1947	Pittsburgh, PA	Notre Dame	40–6
17	October 2, 1948	Pittsburgh, PA	Notre Dame	40–0
18	November 11, 1950	South Bend, IN	Notre Dame	18–7
19	October 20, 1951	Pittsburgh, PA	Notre Dame	33–0
20	October 11, 1952	South Bend, IN	Pittsburgh	22–19
21	October 17, 1953	South Bend, IN	#1 Notre Dame	23–14
22	October 9, 1954	Pittsburgh, PA	#8 Notre Dame	33–0
23	November 10, 1956	Pittsburgh, PA	#20 Pittsburgh	26–13
24	October 26, 1957	South Bend, IN	#7 Notre Dame	13–7
25	November 8, 1958	Pittsburgh, PA	Pittsburgh	29–26
26	November 14, 1959	Pittsburgh, PA	Pittsburgh	28–13
27	November 5, 1960	South Bend, IN	#14 Pittsburgh	20–13
28	November 11, 1961	Pittsburgh, PA	Notre Dame	26–20
29	November 10, 1962	South Bend, IN	Notre Dame	43–22
30	November 9, 1963	South Bend, IN	#8 Pittsburgh	27–7
31	November 7, 1964	Pittsburgh, PA	#1 Notre Dame	17–15
32	November 6, 1965	Pittsburgh, PA	#4 Notre Dame	69–13
33	November 5, 1966	South Bend, IN	#1 Notre Dame	40–0
34	November 11, 1967	Pittsburgh, PA	#9 Notre Dame	38–0
35	November 9, 1968	South Bend, IN	#12 Notre Dame	56–7
36	November 8, 1969	Pittsburgh, PA	#8 Notre Dame	49–7
37	November 7, 1970	South Bend, IN	#2 Notre Dame	46–14
38	November 6, 1971	Pittsburgh, PA	#8 Notre Dame	56–7

No.	Date	Location	Winner	Score
39	October 14, 1972	South Bend, IN	#7 Notre Dame	42–16
40	November 10, 1973	Pittsburgh, PA	#5 Notre Dame	31–10
41	November 16, 1974	South Bend, IN	#5 Notre Dame	14–10
42	November 15, 1975	Pittsburgh, PA	Pittsburgh	34–20
43	September 11, 1976	South Bend, IN	#9 Pittsburgh	31–10
44	September 10, 1977	Pittsburgh, PA	#3 Notre Dame	19–9
45	October 14, 1978	South Bend, IN	Notre Dame	26–17
46	November 6, 1982	Pittsburgh, PA	Notre Dame	31–16
47	November 5, 1983	South Bend, IN	Pittsburgh	21–16
48	October 11, 1986	South Bend, IN	Pittsburgh	10–9
49	October 10, 1987	Pittsburgh, PA	Pittsburgh	30–22
50	October 8, 1988	Pittsburgh, PA	#5 Notre Dame	30–20
51	October 28, 1989	South Bend, IN	#1 Notre Dame	45–7
52	October 27, 1990	Pittsburgh, PA	#3 Notre Dame	31–22
53	October 12, 1991	South Bend, IN	#7 Notre Dame	42–7
54	October 10, 1992	Pittsburgh, PA	#13 Notre Dame	52–21
55	October 9, 1993	South Bend, IN	#4 Notre Dame	44–0
56	November 16, 1996	South Bend, IN	#14 Notre Dame	60–6
57	October 11, 1997	Pittsburgh, PA	Notre Dame	45–21
58	November 13, 1999	Pittsburgh, PA	Pittsburgh	37–27
59	October 6, 2001	South Bend, IN	Notre Dame	24–7
60	October 12, 2002	South Bend, IN	#8 Notre Dame	14–6
61	October 11, 2003	Pittsburgh, PA	Notre Dame	20–14
62	November 13, 2004	South Bend, IN	Pittsburgh	41–38
63	September 3, 2005	Pittsburgh, PA	Notre Dame	42–21
64	November 1, 2008	South Bend, IN	Pittsburgh	36–33^{4OT}
65	November 14, 2009	Pittsburgh, PA	#8 Pittsburgh	27–22
66	October 9, 2010	South Bend, IN	Notre Dame	23–17
67	September 24, 2011	Pittsburgh, PA	Notre Dame	15–12
68	November 3, 2012	South Bend, IN	#3 Notre Dame^{†}	29–26^{3OT}
69	November 9, 2013	Pittsburgh, PA	Pittsburgh	28–21
70	November 7, 2015	Pittsburgh, PA	#5 Notre Dame	42–30
71	October 13, 2018	South Bend, IN	#5 Notre Dame	19–14
72	October 24, 2020	Pittsburgh, PA	#3 Notre Dame	45–3
73	October 28, 2023	South Bend, IN	#14 Notre Dame	58–7
74	November 15, 2025	Pittsburgh, PA	#9 Notre Dame	37–15
Series: Notre Dame leads 51–21–1
† Vacated by Notre Dame

== See also ==
- List of NCAA college football rivalry games
