= Fred Davis II =

American football player (born 2002)

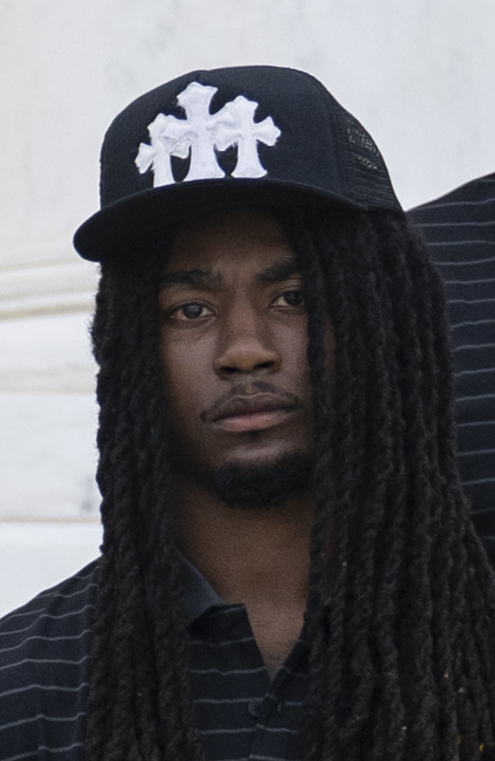
- Davis in 2026

No. 38 – Washington Commanders
- Position: Cornerback
- Roster status: Practice squad

Personal information
- Born: February 12, 2002 (age 24)
- Listed height: 6 ft 1 in (1.85 m)
- Listed weight: 200 lb (91 kg)

Career information
- High school: Trinity Christian (Jacksonville, Florida)
- College: Clemson (2020–2022); UCF (2023); Jacksonville State (2024); Northwestern (2025)
- NFL draft: 2026: undrafted

Career history
- Washington Commanders (2026–present)
- Stats at Pro Football Reference

Fred Davis II (born February 12, 2002) is an American professional football cornerback for the Washington Commanders of the National Football League (NFL). Davis played college football for the Clemson Tigers, UCF Knights, Jacksonville State Gamecocks, and Northwestern Wildcats, and signed with the Commanders as an undrafted free agent in 2026.

== Early life ==
Davis was born on February 12, 2002, and attended high school at Trinity Christian Academy in Jacksonville, Florida. In his senior season, Davis recorded 26 tackles, one interception, and 10 passes defensed. He also played on offense, adding 240 rushing yards for one touchdown and 218 passing yards for three touchdowns. Davis was selected to play in the All-American Bowl. Rated a five-star college football prospect by Rivals.com and 247Sports, he committed to play for the Clemson Tigers.

== College career ==
In 2020, Davis played in 11 games, recording 13 tackles and two passes defensed; two tackles and both passes defensed came in the 2020 ACC Championship Game against the Notre Dame Fighting Irish. He added six tackles in nine games in 2021. In 2022, Davis played in seven games with four starts, recording 13 tackles, two passes defensed, and a fumble recovery; he missed the last six games of the season with an ankle injury. After the 2022 season, he announced his intention to transfer from Clemson.

Davis transferred to the UCF Knights. He played in three games for UCF in 2023 and did not record any statistics. He entered the NCAA transfer portal after the season.

Davis joined the Jacksonville State Gamecocks in 2024, playing in all 14 games with nine starts. He recorded 18 tackles and four passes defensed.

Davis transferred to the Northwestern Wildcats for the 2025 season. He played in 12 games with 11 starts, recording 32 tackles, six passes defensed, and a fumble recovery. After the season, Davis accepted an invitation to the 2026 Senior Bowl.

== Professional career ==
Pre-draft measurables
| Height | Weight | Arm length | Hand span | Wingspan | 40-yard dash | 10-yard split | 20-yard split | 20-yard shuttle | Three-cone drill | Vertical jump | Broad jump |
|---|---|---|---|---|---|---|---|---|---|---|---|
| 6 ft 0 in (1.83 m) | 190 lb (86 kg) | 32 1/2 in (0.83 m) | 8 5/8 in (0.22 m) | 6 ft 6 in (1.98 m) | 4.67 s | 1.64 s | 2.72 s | 4.25 s | 6.97 s | 38.0 in (0.97 m) | 10 ft 3 in (3.12 m) |
All values from Pro Day

=== Washington Commmanders ===
After being invited to the rookie minicamp of the Washington Commanders, Davis signed with the team as an undrafted free agent on May 7, 2026. He was released by the Commanders on August 30, and subsequently re-signed to their practice squad the following day.

== Personal life ==
On July 21, 2021, Davis was involved in a vehicle collision with a United States Postal Service (USPS) vehicle in Clemson, South Carolina. Davis was arrested for reckless driving after the crash and was released after a bond hearing. Clemson police said Davis was traveling 115 miles per hour (mph) in a 55 mph zone before colliding with the mail truck at 70 mph. The mail carrier sustained severe injuries in the crash. Davis, a member of the Clemson Tigers football team at the time, was subject to "internal discipline" by the team but remained on the roster. In 2022, the mail carrier filed a lawsuit against Davis and one of his teammates, alleging that the two "appeared to be racing their vehicles" at the time of the crash; the plaintiff stated she suffered "serious, severe, and permanent injuries" from the incident. The lawsuit was settled in 2024 with undisclosed terms; Davis additionally paid a $440 fine.
