= 2020 All-America college football team =

Official list of the best college football players of 2020

The 2020 All-America college football team includes those players of American college football who have been honored by various selector organizations as the best players at their respective positions. The selector organizations award the "All-America" honor annually following the conclusion of the fall college football season. The original All-America team was the 1889 All-America college football team selected by Caspar Whitney. The National Collegiate Athletic Bureau, which is the National Collegiate Athletic Association's (NCAA) service bureau, compiled, in the 1950, the first list of All-Americans including first-team selections on teams created for a national audience that received national circulation with the intent of recognizing selections made from viewpoints that were nationwide. Since 1957, College Sports Information Directors of America (CoSIDA) has bestowed Academic All-American recognition on male and female athletes in Divisions I, II, and III of the NCAA as well as National Association of Intercollegiate Athletics athletes, including all NCAA championship sports.

The 2020 All-America college football team is composed of the following All-American first teams chosen by the following selector organizations: Associated Press (AP), Football Writers Association of America (FWAA), American Football Coaches Association (AFCA), Walter Camp Foundation (WCFF), Sporting News (TSN, from its historic name of The Sporting News), Sports Illustrated (SI), The Athletic (Athletic), USA Today (USAT) ESPN, CBS Sports (CBS), College Football News (CFN), Scout.com, Athlon Sports, Phil Steele, and Fox Sports (FOX).

Currently, the NCAA compiles consensus all-America teams in the sports of Division I FBS football and Division I men's basketball using a point system computed from All-America teams named by coaches associations or media sources. Players are chosen against other players playing at their position only. To be selected a consensus All-American, players must be chosen to the first team on at least half of the five official selectors as recognized by the NCAA. Second- and third-team honors are used to break ties. Players named first-team by all five selectors are deemed unanimous All-Americans. Currently, the NCAA recognizes All-Americans selected by the AP, AFCA, FWAA, TSN, and the WCFF to determine consensus and unanimous All-Americans.

Twenty-eight players were recognized as consensus All-Americans for 2020, thirteen of them unanimously. Unanimous selections are followed by an asterisk (*)

2020 Consensus All-Americans
Name	Position	Year	University
Mac Jones	Quarterback	Junior	Alabama
Breece Hall*	Running back	Sophomore	Iowa State
Najee Harris*	Running back	Senior	Alabama
Elijah Moore	Wide receiver	Junior	Ole Miss
DeVonta Smith*	Wide receiver	Senior	Alabama
Kyle Pitts*	Tight end	Junior	Florida
Landon Dickerson*	Center	Senior	Alabama
Aaron Banks	Offensive line	Senior	Notre Dame
Brady Christensen	Offensive line	Junior	BYU
Wyatt Davis*	Offensive line	Junior	Ohio State
Liam Eichenberg	Offensive line	Senior	Notre Dame
Kenyon Green	Offensive line	Sophomore	Texas A&M
Alex Leatherwood*	Offensive line	Senior	Alabama
Tarron Jackson	Defensive line	Senior	Coastal Carolina
Patrick Jones II	Defensive line	Senior	Pittsburgh
Daviyon Nixon*	Defensive line	Junior	Iowa
Darius Stills	Defensive line	Senior	West Virginia
Rashad Weaver	Defensive line	Senior	Pittsburgh
Zaven Collins*	Linebacker	Junior	Tulsa
Joseph Ossai	Linebacker	Junior	Texas
Jeremiah Owusu-Koramoah*	Linebacker	Senior	Notre Dame
Talanoa Hufanga	Defensive back	Junior	USC
Brandon Joseph	Defensive back	Freshman	Northwestern
Patrick Surtain II*	Defensive back	Junior	Alabama
Shaun Wade	Defensive back	Senior	Ohio State
José Borregales*	Kicker	Senior	Miami (FL)
Pressley Harvin III*	Punter	Senior	Georgia Tech
Travis Etienne	All-Purpose/Return Specialist	Senior	Clemson
Avery Williams	All-Purpose/Return Specialist	Senior	Boise State

== Offense ==
=== Quarterback ===
- Mac Jones, Alabama (AFCA, AP, Athletic, ESPN, TSN, USAT, WCFF)
- Trevor Lawrence, Clemson (FWAA, Phil Steele)
- Kyle Trask, Florida (CBS)

=== Running back ===
- Breece Hall, Iowa State (AFCA, AP, Athletic, CBS, ESPN, FWAA, Phil Steele, TSN, USAT, WCFF)
- Najee Harris, Alabama (AFCA, AP, CBS, ESPN, FWAA, Phil Steele, TSN, WCFF)
- Jaret Patterson, Buffalo (Athletic, USAT)

=== Wide receiver ===
- Jaelon Darden, North Texas (ESPN, FWAA, Phil Steele, USAT)
- Elijah Moore, Ole Miss (AFCA, AP, Athletic, CBS, Phil Steele, TSN, WCFF)
- DeVonta Smith, Alabama (AFCA, AP, Athletic, CBS, ESPN, FWAA, Phil Steele, TSN, USAT, WCFF)

=== Tight end ===
- Kyle Pitts, Florida (AFCA, AP, Athletic, CBS, ESPN, FWAA, Phil Steele, TSN, USAT, WCFF)

=== Offensive line ===
- Aaron Banks, Notre Dame (AFCA, AP, ESPN, USAT)
- Brady Christensen, BYU (AP, CBS, ESPN, USAT, WCFF)
- Christian Darrisaw, Virginia Tech (CBS)
- Wyatt Davis, Ohio State (AFCA, AP, ESPN, FWAA, Phil Steele, TSN, WCFF)
- Liam Eichenberg, Notre Dame (AFCA, Athletic, CBS, FWAA, Phil Steele, TSN, WCFF)
- Kenyon Green, Texas A&M (Athletic, FWAA, Phil Steele, TSN)
- Alex Leatherwood, Alabama (AFCA, AP, Athletic, CBS, ESPN, FWAA, Phil Steele, TSN, USAT, WCFF)
- Tyler Linderbaum, Iowa (Athletic, USAT)
- Cain Madden, Marshall (Athletic, USAT)

=== Center ===
- Landon Dickerson, Alabama (AFCA, AP, CBS, ESPN, FWAA, Phil Steele, TSN, WCFF)

== Defense ==
=== Defensive line ===
- JaQuan Bailey, Iowa State (FWAA, Phil Steele)
- Christian Barmore, Alabama (CBS)
- Haskell Garrett, Ohio State (CBS)
- Cade Hall, San Jose State (TSN)
- Tarron Jackson, Coastal Carolina (AFCA, AP, Athletic, ESPN, FWAA, Phil Steele, WCFF)
- Patrick Jones II, Pittsburgh (TSN, WCFF)
- Alim McNeill, North Carolina State (Athletic)
- Daviyon Nixon, Iowa (AFCA, AP, Athletic, ESPN, FWAA, Phil Steele, TSN, USAT, WCFF)
- Jaelan Phillips, Miami (FL) (AFCA, Athletic, CBS, USAT)
- Darius Stills, West Virginia (AP, ESPN, TSN, USAT)
- Rashad Weaver, Pittsburgh (AFCA, AP, CBS, ESPN, FWAA, Phil Steele, USAT, WCFF)

=== Linebacker ===
- Zaven Collins, Tulsa (AFCA, AP, Athletic, CBS, ESPN, FWAA, Phil Steele, TSN, USAT, WCFF)
- Dylan Moses, Alabama (AFCA)
- Joseph Ossai, Texas (AP, CBS, ESPN, FWAA, Phil Steele, WCFF)
- Jeremiah Owusu-Koramoah, Notre Dame (AFCA, AP, Athletic, CBS, ESPN, FWAA, Phil Steele, TSN, USAT, WCFF)
- Mike Rose, Iowa State (Athletic, Phil Steele, USAT)
- Chazz Surratt, North Carolina (TSN)

=== Defensive back ===
- Sauce Gardner, Cincinnati (FWAA, Phil Steele, USAT)
- Kyle Hamilton, Notre Dame (FWAA, Phil Steele)
- Talanoa Hufanga, Southern California (AP, Athletic, CBS, ESPN, TSN, USAT, WCFF)
- Shemar Jean-Charles, Appalachian State (WCFF)
- Brandon Joseph, Northwestern (AFCA, AP, CBS, TSN, USAT, WCFF)
- Tiawan Mullen, Indiana (FWAA, Phil Steele)
- Greg Newsome II, Northwestern (Athletic)
- Trevon Moehrig, TCU (ESPN)
- Derek Stingley Jr., LSU (AFCA)
- Eric Stokes, Georgia (CBS)
- Patrick Surtain II, Alabama (AFCA, AP, Athletic, CBS, ESPN, FWAA, Phil Steele, TSN, USAT, WCFF)
- Shaun Wade, Ohio State (AFCA, AP, ESPN, TSN)
- James Wiggins, Cincinnati (Athletic)

== Special teams ==
=== Kicker ===
- José Borregales, Miami (FL) (AFCA, AP, Athletic, FWAA, Phil Steele, TSN, WCFF)
- Will Reichard, Alabama (CBS)
- Cade York, LSU (ESPN, USAT)

=== Punter ===
- Pressley Harvin III, Georgia Tech (AFCA, AP, CBS, ESPN, FWAA, Phil Steele, TSN, USAT, WCFF)
- Zach Von Rosenberg, LSU (Athletic)

=== All-purpose / return specialist ===
- Travis Etienne, Clemson (AP, ESPN, FWAA, Phil Steele, TSN)
- Thomas Fletcher, Alabama (Phil Steele)
- Jeremiah Haydel, Texas State (ESPN)
- Marcus Jones, Houston (CBS, FWAA, Phil Steele)
- Chris Smith, Louisiana (CBS)
- DeVonta Smith, Alabama (CBS)
- Kadarius Toney, Florida (Athletic)
- Avery Williams, Boise State (AFCA, FWAA, Phil Steele, TSN, USAT, WCFF)

== See also ==
- 2020 All-ACC football team
- 2020 All-Big Ten Conference football team
- 2020 All-Big 12 Conference football team
- 2020 All-Pac-12 Conference football team
- 2020 All-SEC football team
- 2020 All-AAC football team
- 2020 All-Conference USA football team
- 2020 All-MAC football team
- 2020 All-Mountain West football team
- 2020 All-Sun Belt football team
