= Charles Snowden =

American football player (born 1998)

No. 47 – Atlanta Falcons
- Position: Outside linebacker
- Roster status: Active

Personal information
- Born: March 27, 1998 (age 28); Silver Spring, Maryland, U.S.
- Listed height: 6 ft 6 in (1.98 m)
- Listed weight: 250 lb (113 kg)

Career information
- High school: St. Albans School (Washington, D.C.)
- College: Virginia (2017–2020)
- NFL draft: 2021: undrafted

Career history
- Chicago Bears (2021); Tampa Bay Buccaneers (2022)*; Las Vegas Raiders (2023–2025); Dallas Cowboys (2026)*; Washington Commanders (2026)*; Atlanta Falcons (2026–present)
- * Offseason or practice squad member only

Awards and highlights
- Second-team All-ACC (2020)

Career NFL statistics as of 2026
- Total tackles: 67
- Sacks: 4.5
- Interceptions: 1
- Pass deflections: 6
- Stats at Pro Football Reference

Charles Snowden (born March 27, 1998) is an American professional football outside linebacker for the Atlanta Falcons of the National Football League (NFL). He played college football for the Virginia Cavaliers.

== Early life ==
Snowden grew up in Silver Spring, Maryland, and initially attended James Hubert Blake High School, where he played basketball and junior varsity football, before transferring to St. Albans School in Washington, D.C. after his freshman year. He enrolled with intention on focusing only on basketball, but Snowden returned to football during his junior year. Snowden committed to play college football at Virginia over an offer to play college basketball at St. Francis (PA).

== College career ==
Snowden became a starter in his sophomore season and finished second on the team with 7.5 tackles for loss along with 2.5 sacks and two interceptions. As a junior, he was named honorable mention All-Atlantic Coast Conference after recording 11 tackles for loss, five sacks and 11 quarterback hurries. Snowden started the first eight games of his senior season before breaking his ankle in a win over Abilene Christian and was named second-team All-ACC after leading the Cavaliers with six sacks and 10 tackles for loss.

== Professional career ==
Pre-draft measurables
Height	Weight	Arm length	Hand span	Wingspan	Bench press
6 ft 6 3/8 in (1.99 m)	243 lb (110 kg)	35 in (0.89 m)	9 5/8 in (0.24 m)	6 ft 9 in (2.06 m)	21 reps
All values from Pro Day

=== Chicago Bears ===
Snowden signed with the Chicago Bears as an undrafted free agent shortly after the conclusion of the 2021 NFL draft. He was waived on August 31, 2021 and re-signed to the practice squad the next day. On December 11, Snowden was promoted to the active roster in advance of the team's game against the Green Bay Packers. Snowden would make his NFL debut in the same game.

Snowden signed a reserve/future contract with the Bears on January 11, 2022. He was waived by the Bears on August 30.

=== Tampa Bay Buccaneers ===
Snowden was signed to the Tampa Bay Buccaneers' practice squad on November 8, 2022. He signed a reserve/future contract with the Buccaneers on January 17, 2023. Snowden was waived by Tampa Bay on August 29.

=== Las Vegas Raiders ===
Snowden was signed to the Las Vegas Raiders practice squad on December 5, 2023. He signed a reserve/future contract with Las Vegas on January 8, 2024.

On August 27, 2024, Snowden was waived by the Raiders and re-signed to the practice squad. He was promoted to the active roster on September 7.

On April 7, 2025, Snowden re-signed with the Raiders. On November 23, Snowden recorded his first career interception during a 24-10 loss to the Cleveland Browns in Week 12.

On April 7, 2026, Snowden re-signed with the Raiders. He was waived by the team on May 2.

=== Dallas Cowboys ===
On June 18, 2026, Snowden signed with the Dallas Cowboys. On July 14, he was suspended for the first three games of the 2026 season due to a previous DUI arrest. On August 2, Snowden was waived with an injury designation. After going unclaimed he was placed on injured reserve. On August 9, the Cowboys released Snowden with an injury settlement.

=== Washington Commanders ===
On September 29, 2026, the Washington Commanders signed Snowden to their practice squad.

=== Atlanta Falcons ===
On October 20, 2026, the Atlanta Falcons signed Snowden off the Commanders practice squad to their active roster.

== NFL career statistics ==
Legend
**Bold**	Career high

=== Regular season ===
Year	Team	Games		Tackles					Interceptions						Fumbles				
Year	Team	GP	GS	Cmb	Solo	Ast	Sck	TFL	Int	Yds	Avg	Lng	TD	PD	FF	Fum	FR	Yds	TD
2021	CHI	2	0	0	0	0	0.0	0	0	0	0.0	0	0	0	0	0	0	0	0
2024	LV	**16**	**9**	**39**	**18**	**21**	1.5	3	0	0	0.0	0	0	**4**	0	0	0	0	0
2025	LV	15	**9**	28	17	11	**3.0**	**5**	**1**	**18**	**18.0**	**18**	0	2	0	0	0	0	0
Career		33	18	67	35	32	4.5	8	1	18	18.0	18	0	6	0	0	0	0	0

== Legal issues ==
On December 9, 2024, Snowden was arrested for DUI in Las Vegas, Nevada. He pleaded no contest to the charge in January 2026.
