= Jaelan Phillips =

American football player (born 1999)

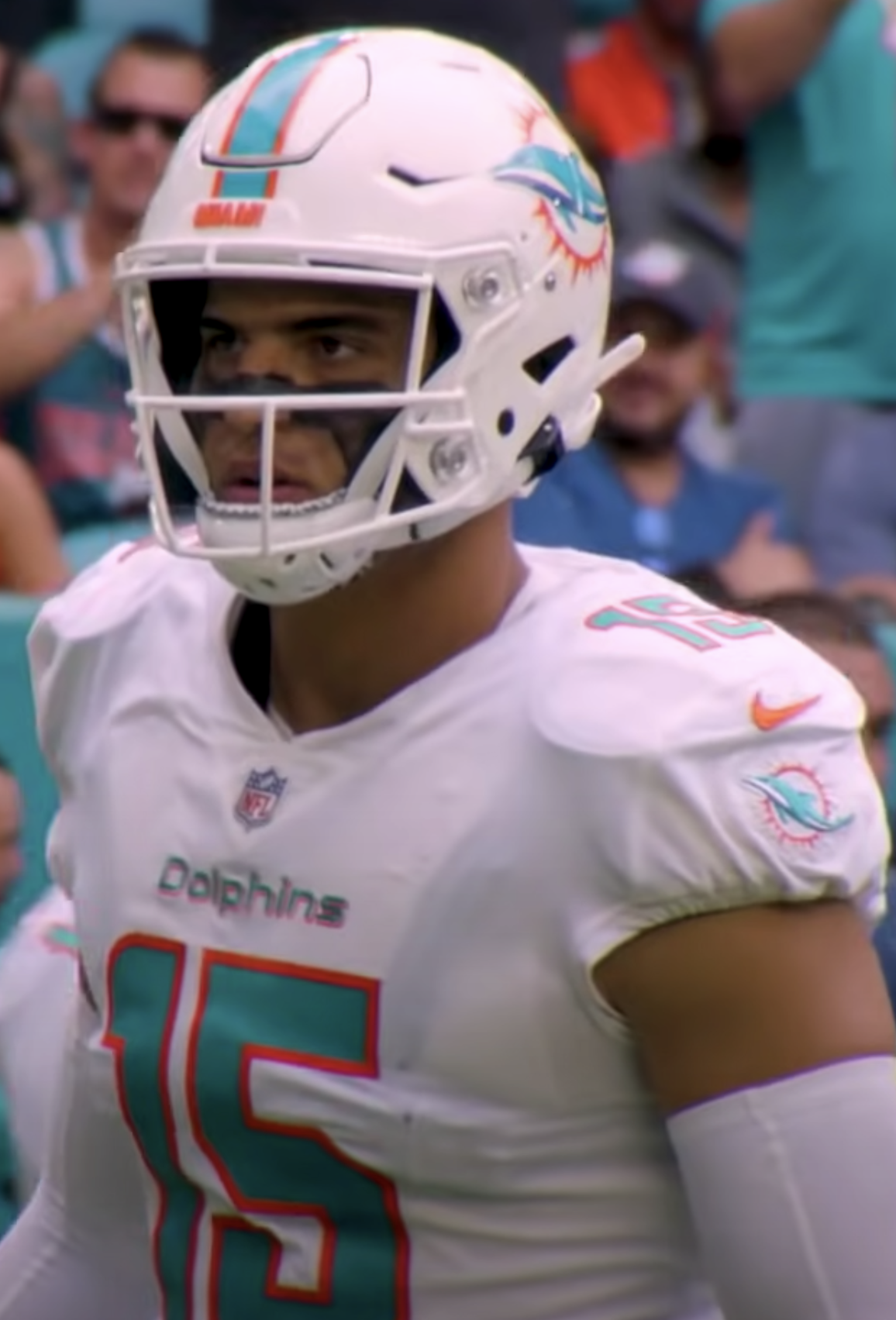
- Phillips with the Miami Dolphins in 2021

No. 5 – Carolina Panthers
- Position: Outside linebacker
- Roster status: Active

Personal information
- Born: May 28, 1999 (age 27); Redlands, California, U.S.
- Listed height: 6 ft 5 in (1.96 m)
- Listed weight: 265 lb (120 kg)

Career information
- High school: Redlands East Valley
- College: UCLA (2017–2018); Miami (FL) (2019–2020)
- NFL draft: 2021: 1st round, 18th overall pick

Career history
- Miami Dolphins (2021–2025); Philadelphia Eagles (2025); Carolina Panthers (2026–present)

Awards and highlights
- PFWA All-Rookie Team (2021); Second-team All-American (2020); Second-team All-ACC (2020)

Career NFL statistics as of Week 10, 2026
- Total tackles: 220
- Sacks: 31.5
- Pass deflections: 11
- Interceptions: 1
- Forced fumbles: 2
- Fumble recoveries: 6
- Stats at Pro Football Reference

Jaelan Everett Phillips (born May 28, 1999) is an American professional football outside linebacker for the Carolina Panthers of the National Football League (NFL). He played college football for the UCLA Bruins and Miami Hurricanes for two seasons each. Phillips went on to study musical production at the Los Angeles City College before transferring to the Frost School of Music at the University of Miami in 2019, where he also made a return to football as a player for the Miami Hurricanes. He was selected by the Miami Dolphins in the first round of the 2021 NFL draft.

== Early life ==
Phillips was born in Redlands, California, on May 28, 1999, and attended Redlands East Valley High School, where he finished with 264 tackles, 31.5 sacks, three forced fumbles, and three interceptions. Considered the top high-school football prospect from the class of 2017, he received over 20 scholarship offers before committing to UCLA.

College recruiting
Name	Hometown	School	Height	Weight	Commit date
Jaelan Phillips; DE	Redlands, CA	Redlands East Valley HS	6 ft 6 in (1.98 m)	250 lb (110 kg)	Apr 15, 2016
Jaelan Phillips; DE	Recruit ratings: Rivals: 247Sports: ESPN:				
Overall recruit ranking: Rivals: 2 (WDE) ESPN: 1 (OLB)
Note: In many cases, Scout, Rivals, 247Sports, On3, and ESPN may conflict in their listings of height and weight.; In these cases, the average was taken. ESPN grades are on a 100-point scale.; Sources: "UCLA Football Commitments". Rivals.; "ESPN". ESPN.; "2017 Team Ranking". Rivals.com.

== College career ==
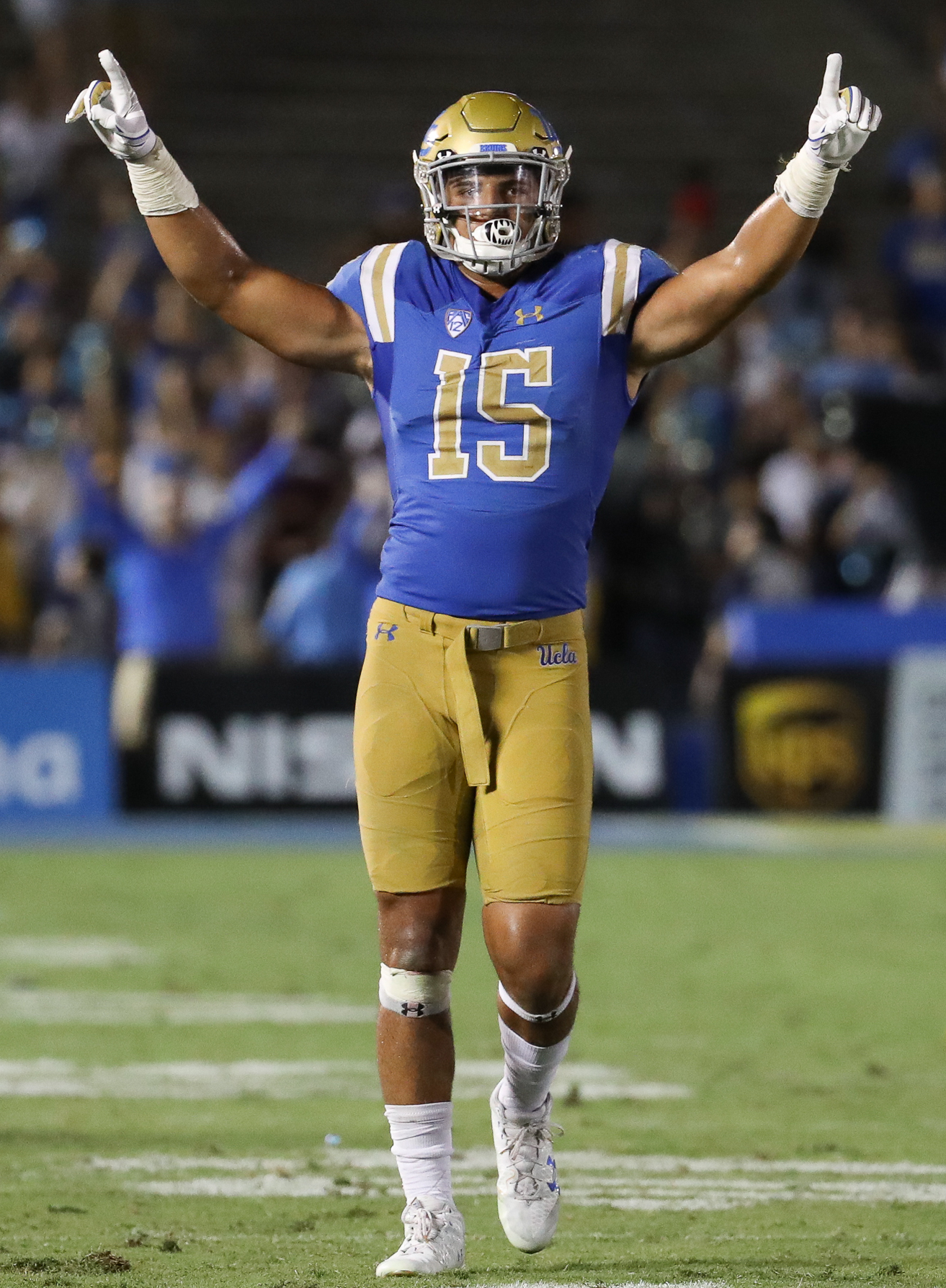
Phillips with UCLA in 2017

As a true freshman in 2017, Phillips played in seven games and recorded 21 tackles (seven for loss), 2 pass deflections, and 3.5 sacks. As a sophomore in 2018, he played in four games before a concussion ended his season. After several other injuries, including being hit by a car while riding a moped, Phillips medically retired from football in December 2018 and enrolled at the Los Angeles City College to study music production.

In 2019, Phillips transferred to the Frost School of Music at the University of Miami with the intent to also play football for the Hurricanes. He sat out of the 2019 season due to NCAA transfer rules but started in 2020, finishing with 45 tackles, eight sacks, and an interception. He was named a second-team All-American and All-ACC and was considered a finalist for the Chuck Bednarik Award. He chose to forgo his remaining collegiate eligibility and enter the 2021 NFL draft.

== Professional career ==
Pre-draft measurables
Height	Weight	Arm length	Hand span	Wingspan	40-yard dash	10-yard split	20-yard split	20-yard shuttle	Three-cone drill	Vertical jump	Broad jump	Bench press
6 ft 5 1/2 in (1.97 m)	260 lb (118 kg)	33 1/4 in (0.84 m)	9 3/4 in (0.25 m)	6 ft 8 3/4 in (2.05 m)	4.57 s	1.59 s	2.69 s	4.18 s	7.13 s	36 in (0.91 m)	10 ft 5 in (3.18 m)	21 reps
All values from Pro Day

=== Miami Dolphins ===
Phillips was drafted by the Miami Dolphins in the first round (18th overall) of the 2021 NFL draft. He signed his four-year rookie contract, worth $14 million, on June 9, 2021.

As a rookie, Phillips appeared in all 17 games and started four in the 2021 season. He had 8.5 sacks, 42 total tackles (23 solo), and one pass defended. He was named to the PFWA All-Rookie Team. In the 2022 season, he had seven sacks, 61 tackles (37 solo), two passes defended, and one forced fumble.

On April 29, 2024, the Dolphins picked up the fifth-year option on Phillips' contract. On July 18, Phillips was placed on the Active/Physically Unable to Perform (PUP) list due to a torn Achilles tendon he suffered the previous season. On September 30, Phillips suffered a knee injury in a Week 4 loss to the Tennessee Titans. This was the second consecutive season in which Phillips ended up out for the rest of the season on injured reserve.

Phillips started all nine games he appeared in for Miami in 2025, recording one fumble recovery, three sacks, and 25 combined tackles. However, Phillips' embarrassing failure to sack Chargers QB Justin Herbert contributed greatly to a Dolphins loss, and Chris Grier was forced to resign largely because he refused to trade Phillips or other overpaid veterans he'd acquired. The Dolphins made it clear to Phillips after Grier left that he would be traded before the 2025 deadline.

=== Philadelphia Eagles ===
On November 3, 2025, the Dolphins traded Phillips to the Philadelphia Eagles in exchange for a 2026 third round pick (87th overall, Will Kacmarek). In his first game with the Eagles, Phillips recorded six tackles and a crucial red zone fumble recovery in a 10–7 win over the Green Bay Packers.

=== Carolina Panthers ===
On March 11, 2026, Phillips signed a four-year, $120 million contract with the Carolina Panthers. In Week 10 against the New Orleans Saints, Phillips recorded five tackles, three tackles for loss, a sack and a fumble recovery in the Panthers 20-17 win, earning him NFC Defensive Player of the Week.

== NFL career statistics ==
Legend
**Bold**	Career high

=== Regular season ===
Year	Team	Games		Tackles					Fumbles			Interceptions					
Year	Team	GP	GS	Cmb	Solo	Ast	Sck	TFL	FF	FR	Yds	Int	Yds	Avg	Lng	TD	PD
2021	MIA	17	5	42	23	19	**8.5**	**9**	0	1	0	0	0	0.0	0	0	1
2022	MIA	17	15	**61**	**37**	**24**	7.0	8	**1**	**2**	0	0	0	0.0	0	0	2
2023	MIA	8	6	43	28	15	6.5	7	0	0	0	**1**	**5**	**5.0**	**5**	0	2
2024	MIA	4	3	6	2	4	1.0	1	0	0	0	0	0	0.0	0	0	2
2025	MIA	9	9	25	15	10	3.0	3	0	1	**4**	0	0	0.0	0	0	0
2025	PHI	8	8	28	14	14	2.0	4	**1**	1	0	0	0	0.0	0	0	**4**
2026	CAR	6	6	15	7	8	3.5	5	0	1	0	0	0	0.0	0	0	0
Career		69	52	220	126	94	31.5	37	2	6	4	1	5	5.0	5	0	11

=== Postseason ===
Year	Team	Games		Tackles					Fumbles			Interceptions					
Year	Team	GP	GS	Cmb	Solo	Ast	Sck	TFL	FF	FR	Yds	Int	Yds	Avg	Lng	TD	PD
2022	MIA	1	1	**9**	**4**	**5**	**0.5**	**2**	0	0	0	0	0	0.0	0	0	0
2025	PHI	1	1	0	0	0	0.0	0	0	0	0	0	0	0.0	0	0	0
Career		2	2	9	4	5	0.5	2	0	0	0	0	0	0.0	0	0	0
