= Boogie Basham =

American football player (born 1997)

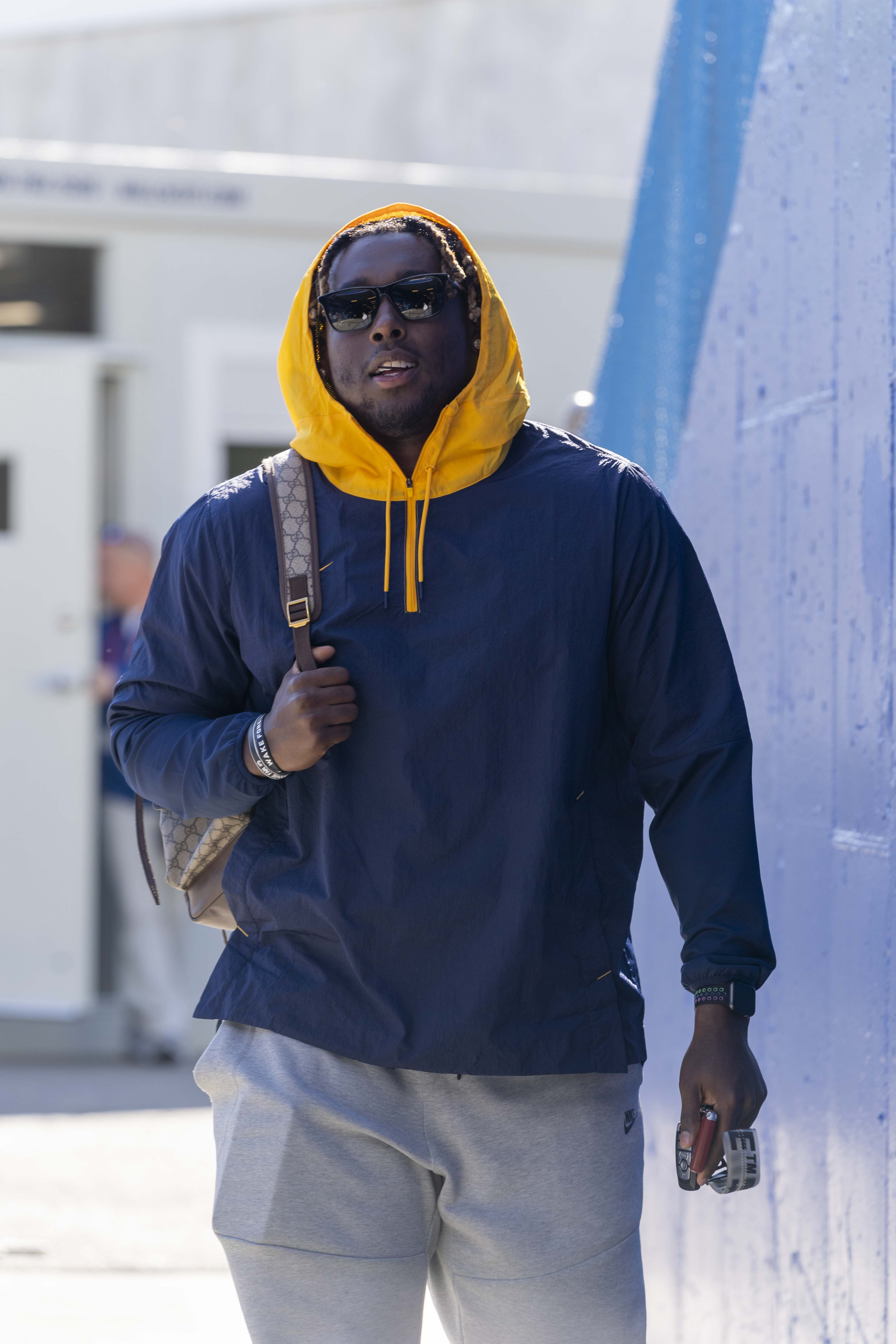
- Basham in 2021

Profile
- Position: Outside linebacker

Personal information
- Born: December 16, 1997 (age 28); Roanoke, Virginia, U.S.
- Listed height: 6 ft 3 in (1.91 m)
- Listed weight: 274 lb (124 kg)

Career information
- High school: Northside (Roanoke)
- College: Wake Forest (2016–2020)
- NFL draft: 2021: 2nd round, 61st overall pick

Career history
- Buffalo Bills (2021–2022); New York Giants (2023–2024); Carolina Panthers (2025); Las Vegas Raiders (2025)*; DC Defenders (2026); Washington Commanders (2026)*
- * Offseason or practice squad member only

Awards and highlights
- First-team All-ACC (2019); Third-team All-ACC (2020)

Career NFL statistics as of 2025
- Tackles: 57
- Sacks: 4.5
- Fumble recoveries: 1
- Pass deflections: 3
- Interceptions: 1
- Stats at Pro Football Reference

Carlos "Boogie" Basham Jr. (born December 16, 1997) is an American professional football linebacker. He played college football for the Wake Forest Demon Deacons and was selected by the Buffalo Bills in the second round of the 2021 NFL draft.

== Early life ==
Basham attended Northside in Roanoke, Virginia. As a senior, he had 76 tackles and seven sacks. He committed to Wake Forest University to play college football.

== College career ==
After redshirting his first year at Wake Forest in 2016, Basham played in all 13 games in 2017 and had 24 tackles. As a junior in 2018, he had 64 tackles and 4.5 sacks. Basham returned to Wake Forest as a starter in 2019. On December 21, 2019, Basham announced that he would resume his college stint for his senior season in 2020.

== Professional career ==
Pre-draft measurables
Height	Weight	Arm length	Hand span	Wingspan	40-yard dash	10-yard split	20-yard split	20-yard shuttle	Three-cone drill	Vertical jump	Broad jump	Bench press
6 ft 3 1/4 in (1.91 m)	274 lb (124 kg)	32 7/8 in (0.84 m)	9 1/4 in (0.23 m)	6 ft 7 1/2 in (2.02 m)	4.59 s	1.63 s	2.70 s	4.32 s	7.13 s	34.0 in (0.86 m)	10 ft 2 in (3.10 m)	20 reps
All values from Pro Day

=== Buffalo Bills ===
Basham was selected by the Buffalo Bills in the second round (61st overall) of the 2021 NFL draft. On May 12, 2021, Basham officially signed with the Bills. As a rookie, he appeared in eight games. He finished with 2.5 sacks and 18 total tackles.

On September 8, 2022, during the kickoff game at the Los Angeles Rams, Basham recorded his first career interception, a 21 yard pick from Matthew Stafford. This interception helped seal the game for the Bills as they won 31–10. Basham also recorded a sack on Stafford earlier in the night. In the 2022 season, he appeared in 15 games and finished with two sacks, 19 total tackles, one interception, two passes defended, and one fumble recovery. Basham recorded a sack in the Bills' Wild Card Round win over the Miami Dolphins.

=== New York Giants ===
On August 29, 2023, Basham was traded to the New York Giants, along with 2025 seventh-round pick (Korie Black), in exchange for a 2025 sixth-round pick (Dorian Strong) . He appeared in 13 games in the 2023 season.

On October 22, 2024, Basham was waived by the Giants and re-signed to the practice squad.

=== Carolina Panthers ===
On January 21, 2025, Basham signed a reserve/future contract with the Carolina Panthers. He was released on August 26, and re-signed to the practice squad. On October 18, Basham was elevated from the practice squad for Carolina's Week 7 game against the New York Jets. He was released on November 4.

=== Las Vegas Raiders ===
On November 25, 2025, Basham was signed to the Las Vegas Raiders' practice squad.

=== DC Defenders ===
On March 12, 2026, Basham signed with the DC Defenders of the United Football League (UFL).

=== Washington Commanders ===
Basham signed with the Washington Commanders on August 25, 2026. Four days later, he was released by the Commanders as a part of final roster cuts before the start of the regular season.

== Personal life ==
Basham is the cousin of NFL defensive end Tarell Basham. He gained his nickname "Boogie" due to his fondness for dancing in his youth.

== NFL career statistics ==
Legend
**Bold**	Career high

=== Regular season ===
Year	Team	Games		Tackles							Interceptions						Fumbles				
Year	Team	GP	GS	Cmb	Solo	Ast	TFL	QBH	Sck	Sfty	PD	Int	Yds	Y/I	Lng	TD	FF	FR	Yds	Y/R	TD
2021	BUF	8	0	18	**11**	7	**4**	3	**2.5**	0	0	0	0	—	0	0	0	0	0	—	0
2022	BUF	**15**	0	**19**	9	**10**	1	**5**	2.0	0	**2**	**1**	**21**	**21.0**	**21**	0	0	**1**	**1**	**1.0**	0
2023	NYG	13	0	11	5	6	0	0	0.0	0	0	0	0	—	0	0	0	0	0	—	0
2024	NYG	4	0	9	1	8	1	1	0.0	0	1	0	0	—	0	0	0	0	0	—	0
Career		40	0	57	26	31	6	9	4.5	0	3	1	21	21.0	21	0	0	1	1	1.0	0

=== Postseason ===
Year	Team	Games		Tackles							Interceptions						Fumbles				
Year	Team	GP	GS	Cmb	Solo	Ast	TFL	QBH	Sck	Sfty	PD	Int	Yds	Y/I	Lng	TD	FF	FR	Yds	Y/R	TD
2021	BUF	2	0	**6**	**5**	1	1	1	**1.0**	0	0	0	0	—	0	0	0	0	0	—	0
2022	BUF	2	0	5	2	**3**	**1**	**2**	**1.0**	0	**1**	0	0	—	0	0	0	0	0	—	0
Career		4	0	11	7	4	2	3	2.0	0	1	0	0	—	0	0	0	0	0	—	0
