= Pressley Harvin III =

American football player (born 1998)

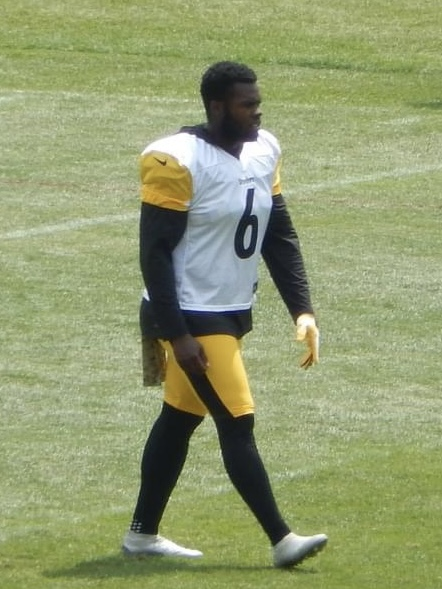
- Harvin with the Pittsburgh Steelers in 2023

Profile
- Position: Punter

Personal information
- Born: September 17, 1998 (age 28); Alcolu, South Carolina, U.S.
- Listed height: 6 ft 0 in (1.83 m)
- Listed weight: 255 lb (116 kg)

Career information
- High school: Sumter (Sumter, South Carolina)
- College: Georgia Tech (2017–2020)
- NFL draft: 2021: 7th round, 254th overall pick

Career history
- Pittsburgh Steelers (2021–2023); San Francisco 49ers (2024)*
- * Offseason or practice squad member only

Awards and highlights
- PFWA All-Rookie Team (2021); Ray Guy Award (2020); Unanimous All-American (2020); First-team All-ACC (2020); Second-team All-ACC (2018); Third-team All-ACC (2017)

Career NFL statistics as of 2024
- Punts: 217
- Punting yards: 9,413
- Average punt: 43.4
- Longest punt: 69
- Inside 20: 75
- Stats at Pro Football Reference

Pressley Harvin III (born September 17, 1998) is an American professional football punter. He played college football for the Georgia Tech Yellow Jackets, where he received unanimous All-American honors and won the Ray Guy Award as the nation's top collegiate punter as a senior. He was selected by the Pittsburgh Steelers in the seventh round of the 2021 NFL draft.

== Early life ==
Harvin was born and grew up in Alcolu, South Carolina. As a youth, he played football as an offensive lineman and volunteered to become the punter for his middle school team in seventh grade. Harvin attended Sumter High School, where he became the Gamecocks' varsity punter as a freshman and also played tight end. As a senior, he punted for an average of 42.5 yards and was named All-State for a second straight season. Harvin also was a member of Sumter's track and field team as a thrower and placed second in shot put and fourth in discus in the South Carolina Class 5A State Championship as a senior.

== College career ==
Harvin became Georgia Tech's starting punter as a true freshman and led all Division I freshmen with 44.1 yards per punt and was named third team All-Atlantic Coast Conference (ACC). As a sophomore, Harvin was named second team All-ACC. He punted for 3,583 yards on 80 punts for an average of 44.8 yards in his junior season. As a senior, Harvin punted 45 times for an average of 48.0 yards, breaking both the school and ACC record, and was named first team All-ACC. He was also a unanimous first team All-America selection and won the Ray Guy Award as the nation's top collegiate punter, becoming the first African American player to win the award.

== Professional career ==
Pre-draft measurables
Height	Weight	Arm length	Hand span	40-yard dash	Broad jump	Bench press
5 ft 11 1/8 in (1.81 m)	263 lb (119 kg)	32 1/8 in (0.82 m)	9 3/8 in (0.24 m)	4.95 s	9 ft 3 in (2.82 m)	14 reps
All values from NFL Combine/Pro Day

=== Pittsburgh Steelers ===
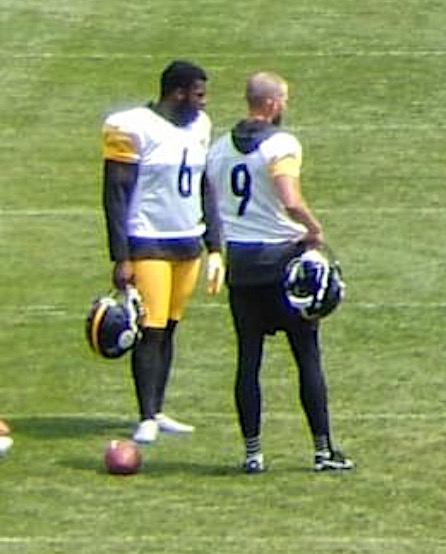
Harvin with Chris Boswell in 2023

Harvin was selected in the seventh round with the 254th overall pick of the 2021 NFL draft by the Pittsburgh Steelers. On May 15, 2021, Harvin signed his four-year rookie contract with Pittsburgh. He was named the team's punter during training camp, beating out incumbent Jordan Berry. Harvin made his NFL debut in the Steelers season opener against the Buffalo Bills September 12, 2021, punting five times for 207 yards in a 23–16 win. He was named to the PFWA All-Rookie Team. He made his first post-season appearance on January 16, 2021 in the AFC Wildcard round against the Kansas City Chiefs. He punted seven times for a combined 348 yards, averaging 49.71 yards per punt in the 21-42 loss.

In the 2022 and 2023 seasons, Harvin struggled with consistency at the punter position. He accumulated 43.83 yards per punt, ranking him 32nd in the league across all starting punters for all 32 teams. On December 23, 2023, in a game against the Cincinnati Bengals, Harvin punted five times for just 194 yards, averaging 38.8 yards per punt. He made his second post-season appearance on January 15, 2024 against the Buffalo Bills. He punted four times for 151 yards, averaging 38.4 yards per punt in the 17-31 loss.

On February 12, 2024, Harvin was released by the Steelers.

=== San Francisco 49ers ===
On August 9, 2024, Harvin signed a one-year deal with the San Francisco 49ers. He was waived on August 26, 2024 prior to the start of the 2024 NFL season.

== Personal life ==
In May 2025, Harvin married his wife, Emily. Their wedding was officiated by former Steelers teammate Miles Killebrew.
