= Tommy Kraemer =

American football player (born 1998)

No. 78, 62
- Position: Guard

Personal information
- Born: April 16, 1998 (age 28); Cincinnati, Ohio, U.S.
- Listed height: 6 ft 6 in (1.98 m)
- Listed weight: 316 lb (143 kg)

Career information
- High school: Elder (Cincinnati)
- College: Notre Dame (2016–2020)
- NFL draft: 2021: undrafted

Career history
- Detroit Lions (2021–2022); New Orleans Saints (2023)

Awards and highlights
- First-team All-ACC (2020)

Career NFL statistics
- Games played: 13
- Games started: 3
- Stats at Pro Football Reference

Thomas Henry Kraemer (born April 16, 1998) is an American former professional football player who was a guard in the National Football League (NFL). Kraemer played college football for the Notre Dame Fighting Irish, and was first signed by the Detroit Lions. Kraemer played two seasons with the Lions and one with the New Orleans Saints before retiring. As of 2025, Kraemer works in real estate.

== Early life ==
Tommy Kraemer was born on April 16, 1998, in Cincinnati, Ohio. He attended Elder High School, where he protected future Northwestern and rival quarterback Peyton Ramsey. After his successful time at Elder High School, Kraemer won the Gatorade Ohio Player of the Year award.

== College career ==
Kraemer was rated as the fourth-best player from the state of Ohio going into college and chose to attend University of Notre Dame. In his freshman year, Kraemer never was entered into a game. In his sophomore year, Kraemer started his first game and later started twelve out of the thirteen games that season. Kraemer helped create a powerful rushing offense that averaged 269.3 rushing yards per game, seventh in the FBS. In his junior year, Kraemer played in twelve games and started in ten of them. In his senior season, Kraemer started the first seven games before suffering a season-ending knee injury versus Michigan. During that season, Kraemer had not allowed a single sack before getting injured. In his graduate and final season, Kraemer once again started ten out of the twelve games that season. Following his graduate year, Kraemer was named on the first team All-Atlantic Coast Conference team and the All-American third team.

== Professional career ==
Pre-draft measurables
Height	Weight	Arm length	Hand span
6 ft 5 1/2 in (1.97 m)	309 lb (140 kg)	33 1/2 in (0.85 m)	10 5/8 in (0.27 m)
All values from Pro Day

=== Detroit Lions ===
After going undrafted in the 2021 NFL draft, Kraemer was signed as an undrafted free agent by the Detroit Lions. Kraemer was waived before the 2021 NFL season began, but was placed on the practice squad. Before week 8 of the 2021 NFL season, Kraemer was promoted to the active roster. He was waived on November 2 and re-signed to the practice squad. He was promoted back to the active roster on November 23.

On September 15, 2022, Kraemer was placed on injured reserve with a back injury.

=== New Orleans Saints ===
On August 2, 2023, Kraemer was signed by the New Orleans Saints. He was waived on August 29, and re-signed to the practice squad. Kraemer was promoted to the active roster on October 7. He was waived on October 9, and re-signed to the practice squad. Kraemer was promoted back to the active roster on October 19, but waived again and re-signed to the practice squad.

Following the end of the regular season, the Saints signed Kraemer to a reserve/future contract on January 8, 2024. He was, again, waived on May 8.
