= Asante Samuel Jr. =

American football player (born 1999)

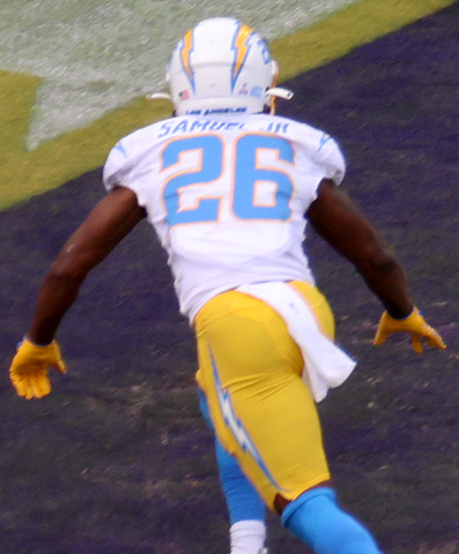
- Samuel with the Los Angeles Chargers in 2021

No. 22 – Pittsburgh Steelers
- Position: Cornerback
- Roster status: Active

Personal information
- Born: October 3, 1999 (age 27); Fort Lauderdale, Florida, U.S.
- Listed height: 5 ft 10 in (1.78 m)
- Listed weight: 180 lb (82 kg)

Career information
- High school: St. Thomas Aquinas (Fort Lauderdale)
- College: Florida State (2018–2020)
- NFL draft: 2021: 2nd round, 47th overall pick

Career history
- Los Angeles Chargers (2021–2024); Pittsburgh Steelers (2025–present)

Awards and highlights
- First-team All-ACC (2020); Third-team All-ACC (2019)

Career NFL statistics as of Week 10, 2026
- Total tackles: 219
- Fumble recoveries: 1
- Pass deflections: 47
- Interceptions: 7
- Stats at Pro Football Reference

Asante Samuel Jr. (born October 3, 1999) is an American professional football cornerback for the Pittsburgh Steelers of the National Football League (NFL). He played college football for the Florida State Seminoles and was selected by the Los Angeles Chargers in the second round of the 2021 NFL draft.

== Early life ==
Samuel was born on October 3, 1999, in Fort Lauderdale, Florida to Asante Samuel Sr. and Candice Doe. Samuel credits his grandmother, Christine Samuel, for helping raise him and being an important person in his life. When he was 14, his mother was diagnosed with a brain tumor, from which she recovered after surgery.

Samuel played high school football at St. Thomas Aquinas in Fort Lauderdale, Florida. He was a four-star recruit coming out of high school and committed to Florida State to play college football.

College recruiting
Name	Hometown	School	Height	Weight	Commit date
Asante Samuel Jr. CB	Fort Lauderdale, Florida	St. Thomas Aquinas High School	5 ft 10 in (1.78 m)	170 lb (77 kg)	Apr 13, 2017
Asante Samuel Jr. CB	Recruit ratings: Rivals: 247Sports: ESPN:				
Overall recruit ranking: Rivals: 46 (#6 CB, #12 FL) 247Sports: 168 (#16 CB, #21 FL) ESPN: 14 (#3 CB, #5 FL)
Note: In many cases, Scout, Rivals, 247Sports, On3, and ESPN may conflict in their listings of height and weight.; In these cases, the average was taken. ESPN grades are on a 100-point scale.; Sources: "2018 Team Ranking". Rivals.com.

== College career ==
As a sophomore in 2019, Samuel was named to the third-team All-ACC team after recording 48 tackles, one interception, and 14 pass breakups. As a junior in 2020, he was named to the first-team All-ACC team.

== Professional career ==
Pre-draft measurables
Height	Weight	Arm length	Hand span	Wingspan	40-yard dash	10-yard split	20-yard split	20-yard shuttle	Three-cone drill	Vertical jump	Broad jump	Bench press
5 ft 10 1/8 in (1.78 m)	180 lb (82 kg)	30 1/8 in (0.77 m)	8 7/8 in (0.23 m)	6 ft 0 1/4 in (1.84 m)	4.41 s	1.50 s	2.56 s	4.09 s	6.98 s	35.0 in (0.89 m)	10 ft 4 in (3.15 m)	12 reps
All values from Pro Day

=== Los Angeles Chargers ===
Samuel was selected by the Los Angeles Chargers in the second round (47th overall) of the 2021 NFL draft. On May 12, 2021, Samuel signed with the Chargers on a deal worth just over $7 million. He recorded his first career interception in week 2 against the Dallas Cowboys. He was Pepsi NFL Rookie of the Week in back-to-back weeks, weeks 2 and 3. As a rookie, he appeared in and started 12 games. He finished with 43 total tackles (33 solo), two interceptions, and 11 passes defended.

Samuel recorded his first interception of the 2022 season in week 1 against the Las Vegas Raiders. In the 2022 season, Samuel appeared in all 17 games and started 15. He finished with 57 total tackles (48 solo), two interceptions, and 11 passes defended. In the Wild Card Round of the playoffs, Samuel recorded three interceptions in the first half in the team's 31–30 loss to the Jacksonville Jaguars. In the 2023 season, Samuel recorded 63 tackles, two interceptions, and 13 passes defended.

After four games, Samuel was placed on injured reserve for a shoulder injury on October 12, 2024.

=== Pittsburgh Steelers ===
On November 12, 2025, the Pittsburgh Steelers signed Samuel to their practice squad. He was promoted to the active roster on December 2. In a December 15 game against the Miami Dolphins, his third game as a Steeler, Samuel intercepted a Tua Tagovailoa pass for his first interception in over two years.

On March 12, 2026, Samuel re-signed with the Steelers on a one-year, $4 million contract.

== Personal life ==
He is the son of former NFL cornerback Asante Samuel.
