= Patrick Jones II =

American football player (born 1998)

No. 91 – Carolina Panthers
- Position: Outside linebacker
- Roster status: Active

Personal information
- Born: September 29, 1998 (age 28); Yokosuka, Japan
- Listed height: 6 ft 4 in (1.93 m)
- Listed weight: 264 lb (120 kg)

Career information
- High school: Grassfield (Chesapeake, Virginia, U.S.)
- College: Pittsburgh (2017–2020)
- NFL draft: 2021: 3rd round, 90th overall pick

Career history
- Minnesota Vikings (2021–2024); Carolina Panthers (2025–present)

Awards and highlights
- Consensus All-American (2020); First-team All-ACC (2020); Second-team All-ACC (2019)

Career NFL statistics as of 2025
- Total tackles: 114
- Sacks: 13
- Forced fumbles: 1
- Pass deflections: 1
- Stats at Pro Football Reference

Patrick Allen Jones II (born September 29, 1998) is an American professional football outside linebacker for the Carolina Panthers of the National Football League (NFL). He played college football for the Pittsburgh Panthers.

== Early life ==
Jones was born on a U.S. military base in Yokosuka, Japan. He grew up in Chesapeake, Virginia and attended Grassfield High School. As a senior, he recorded 83 tackles, 12.5 tackles for loss and 8.5 sacks and was named All-Tidewater. Jones committed to play college football at Pittsburgh over offers from Virginia Tech, California, Duke, Illinois, and NC State.

== College career ==
Jones enrolled at Pittsburgh a semester early and redshirted his true freshman season. As a redshirt freshman, he made seven total tackles and recorded a half of a sack. Jones entered the defensive line rotation as a redshirt sophomore and finished the season with 23 tackles, 7.5 tackles for loss, four sacks and a forced fumble. Jones became a starter going into his redshirt junior year and was named second team All-Atlantic Coast Conference (ACC) after recording 43 tackles, 12 tackles for loss, 8.5 sacks, four forced fumbles and 18 quarterback hurries.

Going into his redshirt senior year, Jones was named to the Chuck Bednarik Award, Ted Hendricks Award and Bronko Nagurski Trophy watchlists and was considered to be one of the top prospects at his position for the 2021 NFL draft. Jones was named the ACC Defensive Lineman of the Week and the Chuck Bednarik Award Player of the Week for the third week of the season after recording six tackles with three sacks and three tackles for loss in a 23–20 win over Louisville and again the following week after a three sack performance against Boston College. Jones finished the year with 44 tackles, 13 tackles for loss, nine sacks and a fumble recovery.

== Professional career ==
Pre-draft measurables
Height	Weight	Arm length	Hand span	Wingspan	40-yard dash	10-yard split	20-yard split	Vertical jump	Broad jump	Bench press
6 ft 4 1/4 in (1.94 m)	261 lb (118 kg)	32 7/8 in (0.84 m)	10 in (0.25 m)	6 ft 7 1/8 in (2.01 m)	4.94 s	1.58 s	2.83 s	31.5 in (0.80 m)	8 ft 11 in (2.72 m)	22 reps
All values from Pro Day

=== Minnesota Vikings ===
Jones was drafted by the Minnesota Vikings in the third round (90th overall) of the 2021 NFL draft. The Vikings obtained the aforementioned third round selection after trading defensive end Yannick Ngakoue to the Baltimore Ravens.

=== Carolina Panthers ===
On March 12, 2025, Jones signed with the Carolina Panthers on a two-year, $20 million contract. In four starts, he recorded one pass deflection, one sack, and nine combined tackles. On October 15, head coach Dave Canales announced that Jones would require season-ending back surgery.
