= Miles Fox =

American gridiron football player (born 1997)

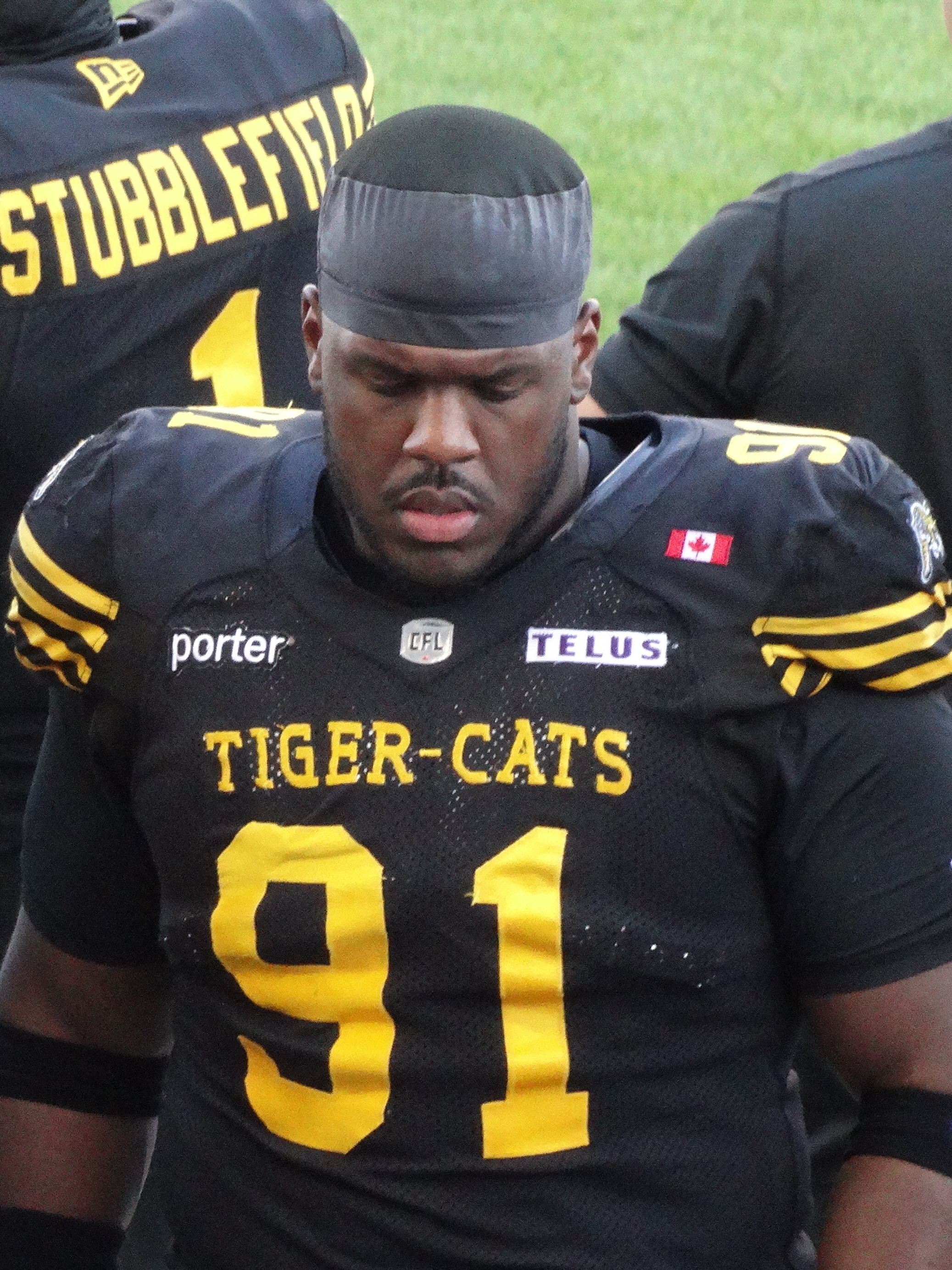
- Fox with the Hamilton Tiger-Cats in 2025

No. 91 – Hamilton Tiger-Cats
- Position: Defensive tackle
- CFL status: American

Personal information
- Born: January 23, 1997 (age 29); Decatur, Georgia, U.S.
- Listed height: 6 ft 1 in (1.85 m)
- Listed weight: 300 lb (136 kg)

Career information
- High school: Collins Hill (Suwanee, Georgia)
- College: Wake Forest (2019-2021); Old Dominion (2015-2018)
- NFL draft: 2022: undrafted

Career history
- BC Lions (2022); Winnipeg Blue Bombers (2023–2024); Hamilton Tiger-Cats (2025–present)

Awards and highlights
- All-ACC First Team (AP) (2020); All-ACC Third Team (ACC Media & Coaches) (2020); All-ACC Fourth Team (Phil Steele) (2020); All-ACC Second Team (Phil Steele, Athlon Sports, Lindy’s Sports) (2021)

Miles Fox (born January 23, 1997) is an American professional football defensive tackle for the Hamilton Tiger-Cats of the Canadian Football League (CFL). He played college football for the Wake Forest Demon Deacons of the Atlantic Coast Conference (ACC). Prior to playing for Wake Forest as a graduate transfer, he attended and played football for the Old Dominion University Monarchs of Conference USA (C-USA). At Old Dominion, he earned 2017 All-Conference USA Honorable Mention honors. In 2020, at Wake Forest, he was named to the Associated Press’ (AP) All-ACC First Team, ACC Media and Coaches’ All-ACC Third Team, Phil Steele’s All-ACC Fourth Team, as well as nominated for the ACC's Piccolo Award, which recognizes the Conference's Comeback Player of the Year, based on Fox's 2020 season performance after having suffered a ruptured Achilles tendon in Spring 2019 and missing the entire 2019 season due to the injury. In 2021, he was named to the All-ACC Second Team by the AP, Phil Steele, Athlon Sports, and Lindy's Sports.

== Early life ==
Fox attended and played football at Collins Hill High School in Suwanee, Georgia, where he was a team captain for both his junior and senior seasons.

As a senior, he earned Gwinnett Daily Post Defensive Player of the Week honors for his performance against Central Gwinnett High School, in which he posted nine tackles, three tackles for loss, three sacks, and two quarterback hurries. He also recorded 16 tackles and four tackles for loss against Norcross High School. He earned Class 7A First Team All-County and First Team All-Region 6 honors after recording 80 tackles, eight sacks, and one fumble recovery.

As a part of the class of 2015, he was a three-star college football recruit prospect. He committed to attend and play college football at Old Dominion University of Conference USA in Norfolk, Virginia, over scholarship offers from Arizona State, Iowa, Georgia Tech, Middle Tennessee, Georgia State, Kent State, and South Alabama.

== College career ==
=== 2015 ===
In his college football debut against Eastern Michigan, Fox made two solo tackles and one tackle for loss as a freshman reserve defensive tackle for Old Dominion. His best freshman season performance came against Appalachian State, in which he recorded four tackles (one solo), 1.5 tackles for loss, and 0.5 sack. The following game, he made his first career start at defensive tackle against Marshall and recorded four tackles. He forced his first career fumble against Florida International. He finished his 2015 freshman season with appearances in all 12 games, starting one, and recorded 25 tackles (nine solo), three tackles for loss, three quarterback hits/hurries, one forced fumble, and 0.5 sack.

=== 2016 ===
As a sophomore, Fox played in 11 games, starting 9, at defensive tackle for Old Dominion. His best games of the season came against Appalachian State, in which he posted eight tackles (four solo) and one tackle for loss, and UTSA, in which he recorded one solo tackle, one tackle for loss, one sack, and one forced fumble. Fox helped the Monarchs to its first postseason bowl and first bowl victory in program history as they defeated Eastern Michigan 24–20 in the 2016 Bahamas Bowl in Nassau, Bahamas. He finished the 2016 season with 27 tackles (13 solo), seven quarterback hurries, 4.5 tackles for loss, two sacks, and one forced fumble. His seven quarterback hurries mark is tied for the fifth-most all-time in a single season in Old Dominion program history.

=== 2017 ===
In Old Dominion’s season-opener against Albany, Fox recorded seven tackles (four solo), 1.5 sacks, and 1.5 tackles for loss. Against Massachusetts, he recorded six tackles (two solo), career-high two sacks (tied for single-game team-high on the season), and two tackles for loss. He recorded six tackles (three solo) against then-No. 13-ranked Virginia Tech. Against Florida Atlantic, in which he made seven tackles (two solo), one forced fumble, one sack, and one tackle for loss. In the final game of the season against Middle Tennessee, he recorded eight tackles (tying his career-high), including six solo tackles, 2.5 tackles for loss (single-game team-high on the season), and one sack.

As a junior, Fox started all 12 games at defensive tackle, and finished the 2017 season with the fourth-most tackles (57), second-most sacks (5.5), and third-most tackles for loss (9) on his team. His 5.5 sacks are tied for the eighth-most in a single season in Old Dominion history.

His season performance earned him 2017 All-Conference USA Honorable Mention honors. He is one of 31 Old Dominion players to ever receive All-Conference USA recognition in program history (excluding Conference USA All-Freshman Team members).

In an interview with 247Sports, he attributed, in part, his significant jump in performance and productivity during the 2017 season to his incorporation of yoga into his prior off-season's training regimen, which provided him with increased flexibility and athleticism.

=== 2018 ===
As a senior, Fox started four games at defensive tackle for the Monarchs. He recorded his first and only career rushing attempt in Old Dominion's season-opening game against Liberty. Although playing through injury and limited to special teams, he contributed to the biggest victory in Old Dominion history, and its first win over a Power-5 Conference opponent since the football program resumed in 2009, when the Monarchs defeated the No. 13-ranked Virginia Tech Hokies. After starting the first four games of the 2018 season, he did not appear in another game and ultimately redshirted the season after sustaining a pair of ruptured ligaments as well as grade three turf toe. Redshirting the 2018 season allowed Fox to retain his final year of collegiate eligibility.

In his three-plus seasons playing defensive tackle at Old Dominion, Fox appeared in 39 games, starting 26, and recorded 116 tackles (52 solo), 16.5 tackles for loss, 12 quarterback hits/hurries, eight sacks, and three forced fumbles. His eight career sacks at Old Dominion is the ninth-most all-time in program history.

=== 2019 ===
After graduating from Old Dominion, Fox enrolled at Wake Forest University in January 2019 and joined the Demon Deacons’ football team as a graduate transfer. In transferring from Old Dominion to Wake Forest, Fox was a part of the first off-season of the “transfer portal’s” existence following the NCAA's change to the college athlete transfer rules, which allowed for active college football players to enter their names into the portal and permitted other programs to initiate recruiting contact with portal players for potential transfer.

After recovering from plantar plate surgery on his 2018 season injuries, he joined the Demon Deacons’ football team for its off-season training program. However, just three days after being medically cleared (plantar injury) to participate in spring practice, he suffered a ruptured Achilles tendon in a non-contact drill before a scrimmage, which forced him to miss the 2019 season and required surgery and 14 months of recovery and rehabilitation.

=== 2020 ===
In 2020, Fox appeared in all nine of Wake Forest’s games, starting the final five games, at defensive tackle. In his Wake Forest debut and 2020 season-opening game against No. 1-ranked Clemson, Fox recorded two solo tackles, one tackle for loss, and one sack of quarterback, Trevor Lawrence, who would go on to be the 2020 ACC Player of the Year (football), ACC Athlete of the Year (all sports), and Heisman Trophy runner-up. In Wake Forest’s December 12 game against Louisville, he recorded six solo tackles, a career-high four tackles for loss, and one sack, which earned him ACC Defensive Lineman of the Week honors.

He finished the season with 24 tackles (17 solo), one pass breakup, one quarterback hit/hurry, and one fumble recovery. He recorded a team-high 10.5 tackles for loss and ranked third on the Demon Deacons in sacks with 3.5. Of Wake Forest’s graduate transfers, Fox, along with placekicker, Jack Crane, registered the most playing time during the 2020 season.

His season performance earned him national attention as well as numerous high-profile honors, including AP All-ACC First Team, ACC Media and Coaches’ All-ACC Third Team, and Phil Steele's All-ACC Fourth Team. Coming off of his ruptured Achilles injury in 2019, his 2020 season performance also earned him recognition as a nominee for the Piccolo Award, given to the ACC's Comeback Player of the Year.

=== 2021 ===
Fox returned to Wake Forest for the 2021 season and his seventh season of college football, invoking the NCAA's decision to grant athletes an extra year of eligibility due to the COVID-19 pandemic. Entering the season, Fox was selected to the Preseason All-ACC Second Team by Phil Steele, Athlon Sports, and Lindy's Sports. He was named a Wake Forest team captain for the 2021 season.

In Wake Forest’s season-opening game against his former team, Old Dominion, Fox recorded five tackles (three solo) in the Demon Deacons’ 42–10 victory. He was named to the Pro Football Network's College Football Team of the Week First Team for his Week 4 efforts against Syracuse, in which he recorded two tackles (one solo), 1.5 tackles for loss, 0.5 sack, one quarterback hit, and six quarterback pressures.

Starting at defensive tackle in all 12 games in which he played, Fox helped Wake Forest to an 8–0 start to the 2021 season, ranking as high as No. 9 in both the College Football Playoff Rankings and the AP Poll. The Demon Deacons ultimately finished the season as the No. 15-ranked team nationally with an 11–3 record and 38–10 victory over Rutgers in the TaxSlayer Gator Bowl, in which he recorded four tackles (three solo), one tackle for loss, and one quarterback hurry. He finished the season with 34 tackles (14 solo) and two quarterback hits/hurries. His seven tackles for loss and three sacks both ranked fourth-most on the team, respectively.

Fox's 2021 season performance earned him consensus All-ACC Second Team honors by the ACC Media and Coaches’, the AP, Phil Steele, Athlon Sports, and Lindy's Sports.

=== College statistics ===
Season	Team	G	GS	Tot	Solo	TFL	Sack	QBH	FF	FR	PBU
2015	ODU	12	1	25	9	3.0	0.5	3	1	0	0
2016	ODU	11	9	27	13	4.5	2.0	7	1	0	0
2017	ODU	12	12	57	26	9.0	5.5	1	1	0	0
2018	ODU	4	4	7	4	0.0	0.0	1	0	0	1
2019*	WF	0	0	0	0	0	0	0	0	0	0
2020	WF	9	5	24	17	10.5	3.5	1	0	1	1
2021	WF	12	12	34	14	7.0	3.0	2	0	0	0
Totals		60	43	174	83	34.0	14.5	15	3	1	2

*Fox missed the entire 2019 season due to a ruptured Achilles tendon.

== Professional career ==
Pre-draft measurables
Height	Weight	Arm length	Hand span	Wingspan	40-yard dash	10-yard split	20-yard split	20-yard shuttle	Three-cone drill	Vertical jump	Broad jump	Bench press
6 ft 0 in (1.83 m)	289 lb (131 kg)	32 1/2 in (0.83 m)	9 7/8 in (0.25 m)	6 ft 5 3/4 in (1.97 m)	5.06 s	1.68 s	2.93 s	4.46 s	7.71 s	31.0 in (0.79 m)	9 ft 5 in (2.87 m)	30 reps
All values from Pro Day

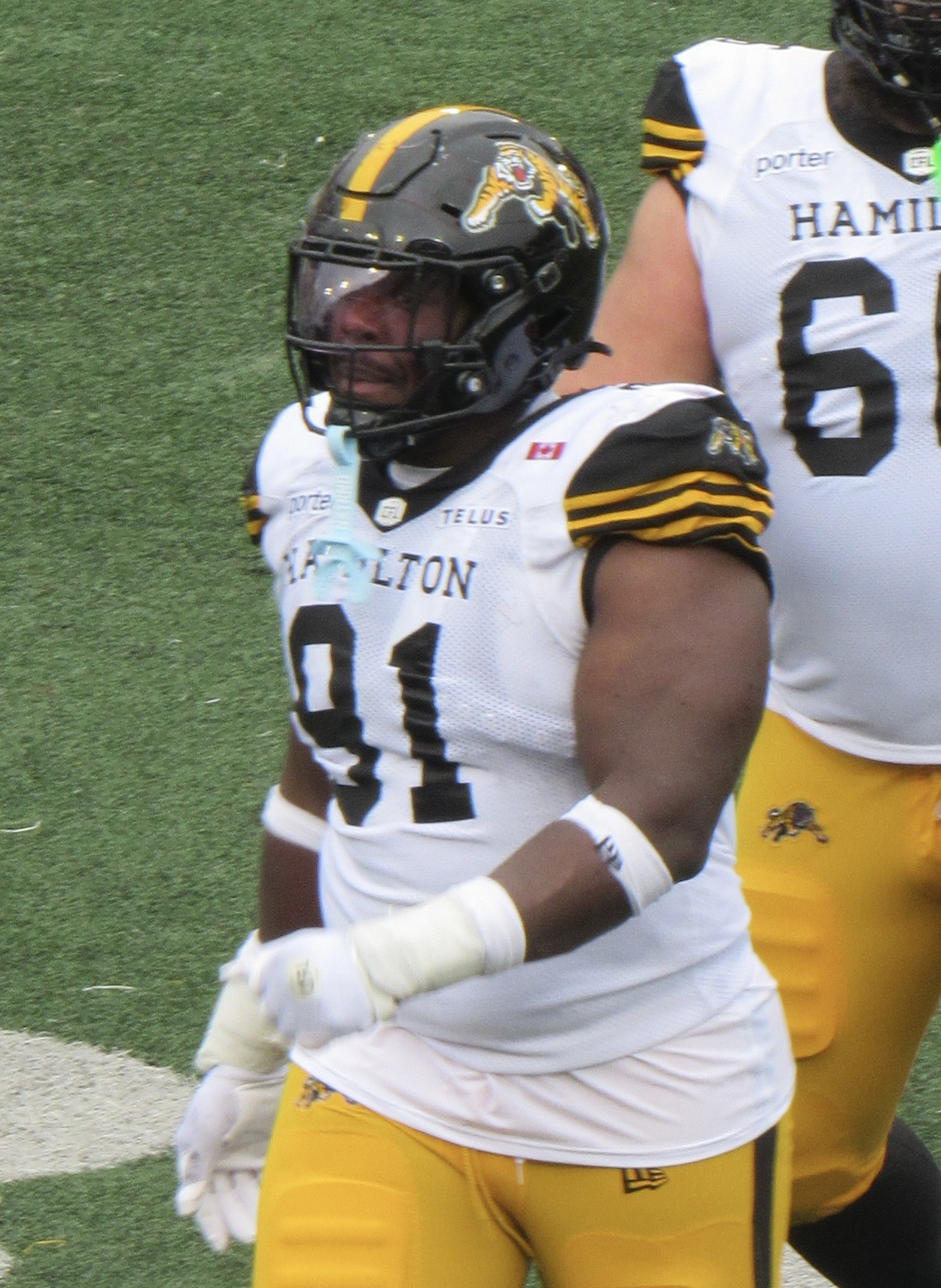
Fox in 2025

In 2022, Fox was invited to rookie mini camp on a tryout basis with the Buffalo Bills.

=== BC Lions ===
On May 21, 2022, Fox signed with the BC Lions of the Canadian Football League (CFL). On June 4, 2023, Fox was released by the Lions.

=== Winnipeg Blue Bombers ===
Fox was signed to the practice roster of the Winnipeg Blue Bombers on June 12, 2023. He became a free agent upon the expiry of his contract on February 11, 2025.

=== Hamilton Tiger-Cats ===
On February 11, 2025, Fox signed a two-year contract with the Hamilton Tiger-Cats.

== Personal life ==
Fox was born to George and Cheryl Fox, in Lawrenceville, Georgia, where he was raised along with his little brother, Jackson, and sister, Gabriella. Jackson, who is autistic, is a “source of motivation and inspiration” for Fox, including during Fox's trying times resulting from his 2019 Achilles tendon rupture. While at Wake Forest, he created a children's book series, Joyful Jamal!, based on Jackson and that highlights the daily challenges of children with autism. Fox plans to one day found a non-profit organization, the mission of which will include assisting families with autistic children.

In 2015, as a freshman at Old Dominion, he was named to the Conference USA Commissioner's Honor Roll for his academic achievements. In 2018, he graduated from Old Dominion with a bachelor's degree in Communications and minor in Sports Management. After enrolling at Wake Forest in January 2019, he earned his Liberal Arts Studies master's degree after the Fall semester of 2020. He was named to the 2021 All-ACC Academic Team.

In the summer of 2019, while rehabbing his Achilles injury, he returned home to Lawrenceville, where he dedicated 20 hours each week to serving underprivileged youth at a local church as well as his former and other local high schools.

In 2021, Fox appeared as a guest interviewee on the Movin’ The Sticks with Mason Shand and Cody Downham podcast and the Pypeline ACC Podcast.

The mother of his Wake Forest teammate, Peyton Woulard, was Fox's seventh grade teacher. Fox and Woulard were also high school teammates at Collins Hill as a high school senior and freshman, respectively.
