= Alim McNeill =

American football player (born 2000)

No. 54 – Detroit Lions
- Position: Defensive tackle
- Roster status: Active

Personal information
- Born: May 11, 2000 (age 26); Raleigh, North Carolina, U.S.
- Listed height: 6 ft 2 in (1.88 m)
- Listed weight: 310 lb (141 kg)

Career information
- High school: Sanderson (Raleigh)
- College: NC State (2018–2020)
- NFL draft: 2021: 3rd round, 72nd overall pick

Career history
- Detroit Lions (2021–present)

Awards and highlights
- First-team All-American (2020); First-team All-ACC (2020); Freshman All-American (2018)

Career NFL statistics as of 2025
- Total tackles: 151
- Sacks: 12.5
- Forced fumbles: 3
- Pass deflections: 4
- Stats at Pro Football Reference

Alim McNeill (born May 11, 2000) is an American professional football defensive tackle for the Detroit Lions of the National Football League (NFL). He played college football for the NC State Wolfpack, and was selected by the Lions in the third round of the 2021 NFL draft.

== Early life ==
McNeill attended Jesse O. Sanderson High School in Raleigh, North Carolina. He played linebacker and running back in high school. McNeill committed to North Carolina State University to play college football. He also played baseball in high school.

== College career ==
McNeill played at NC State from 2018 to 2020. During his career, he had 77 tackles, 10 sacks, one interception and one touchdown. As a junior, he was named an All-American by The Athletic and Pro Football Focus as well as earning All-ACC honors. After that season, he entered the 2021 NFL draft.

== Professional career ==
Pre-draft measurables
Height	Weight	Arm length	Hand span	Wingspan	40-yard dash	10-yard split	20-yard split	20-yard shuttle	Three-cone drill	Vertical jump	Broad jump	Bench press
6 ft 1 7/8 in (1.88 m)	317 lb (144 kg)	32 5/8 in (0.83 m)	9 3/8 in (0.24 m)	6 ft 7 in (2.01 m)	4.96 s	1.68 s	2.90 s	4.65 s	7.68 s	30.5 in (0.77 m)	9 ft 0 in (2.74 m)	27 reps
All values from Pro Day

McNeill was drafted 72nd overall by the Detroit Lions in the third round of the 2021 NFL draft. He signed his four-year rookie contract on May 13, 2021.

McNeill entered the 2023 season as the Lions starting defensive tackle. In Week 8, he recorded two sacks, his first career multi-sack game, and a pass deflection in a 26–14 win over the Las Vegas Raiders. He suffered a knee injury in Week 13 and was placed on injured reserve on December 5, 2023. He was activated on January 6, 2024.

On October 15, 2024, McNeill signed a four-year, $97 million contract extension with the Lions. In Week 6's 47–9 victory over the Dallas Cowboys, McNeill recorded two sacks. In Week 15, McNeill tore his ACL in the 48–42 loss to the Buffalo Bills, ending his season. Prior to the injury, McNeill recorded 25 tackles, 3.5 sacks, seven tackles for loss, and seven quarterback hits.

After spending the first six weeks of the season on the PUP list, McNeill was activated for his season debut on October 20, 2025.

== NFL career statistics ==
Legend
**Bold**	Career high

Regular season
Year	Team	Games		Tackles						
Year	Team	GP	GS	Cmb	Solo	Ast	Sck	TFL	PD	FF
2021	DET	17	6	39	15	**24**	2.0	3	**1**	0
2022	DET	17	17	**41**	**17**	**24**	1.0	6	0	0
2023	DET	13	13	32	**17**	15	**5.0**	6	**1**	**1**
2024	DET	14	14	25	**17**	8	3.5	**7**	**1**	**1**
2025	DET	10	10	14	5	9	1.0	2	**1**	**1**
Career		71	60	151	71	80	12.5	24	4	3

Postseason
Year	Team	Games		Tackles						
Year	Team	GP	GS	Cmb	Solo	Ast	Sck	TFL	PD	FF
2023	DET	3	3	4	1	3	1.0	1	0	0
Total		3	3	4	1	3	1.0	1	0	0
