= Liam Eichenberg =

American football player (born 1998)

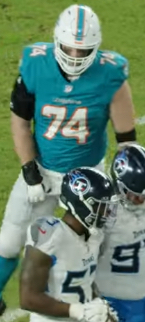
- Eichenberg with the Miami Dolphins in 2024

Profile
- Position: Guard

Personal information
- Born: January 19, 1998 (age 28); Cleveland, Ohio, U.S.
- Listed height: 6 ft 6 in (1.98 m)
- Listed weight: 300 lb (136 kg)

Career information
- High school: Saint Ignatius (Cleveland)
- College: Notre Dame (2016–2020)
- NFL draft: 2021: 2nd round, 42nd overall pick

Career history
- Miami Dolphins (2021–2025)

Awards and highlights
- Jacobs Blocking Award (2020); Consensus All-American (2020); First-team All-ACC (2020)

Career NFL statistics as of 2025
- Games played: 60
- Games started: 52
- Stats at Pro Football Reference

William Gregory Eichenberg (EYE-kən-berg; born January 19, 1998) is an American professional football guard. He played college football for the Notre Dame Fighting Irish and was selected by the Dolphins in the second round of the 2021 NFL draft.

== Early life ==
Eichenberg was born on January 19, 1998, in Cleveland, Ohio. He attended Saint Ignatius High School and played in the 2016 Under Armour All-American Game. In 2015, he committed to play college football at the University of Notre Dame.

== College career ==
After redshirting his first year at Notre Dame in 2016, Eichenberg played in five games as a backup in 2017. He took over as the starting left tackle in 2018 and started every game for them until 2020.

== Professional career ==
Pre-draft measurables
Height	Weight	Arm length	Hand span	20-yard shuttle	Three-cone drill	Vertical jump	Broad jump	Bench press
6 ft 6 1/8 in (1.98 m)	306 lb (139 kg)	32 3/8 in (0.82 m)	9 5/8 in (0.24 m)	4.57 s	7.53 s	26.5 in (0.67 m)	8 ft 9 in (2.67 m)	33 reps
All values from Pro Day

Eichenberg was selected by the Miami Dolphins in the second round (42nd overall) of the 2021 NFL draft. Eichenberg signed his four-year rookie contract with Miami on July 27, 2021.

Eichenberg entered the 2022 season as the Dolphins starting left guard. He was placed on injured reserve on November 1, 2022. He was activated on December 27.

In Week 4 of the 2023 season, Eichenberg had his first professional career start as center, filling in for an injured Connor Williams.

On March 14, 2025, Eichenberg re-signed with the Dolphins on a one-year contract. He was placed on the reserve/PUP list on August 27, due to an undisclosed injury. On March 2, 2026, Eichenberg was released by the Dolphins after a failed physical.

== Personal life ==
Liam's younger brother, Tommy Eichenberg, is a linebacker for the Las Vegas Raiders.
