= Aaron Banks (American football) =

American football player (born 1997)

No. 65 – Green Bay Packers
- Position: Guard
- Roster status: Active

Personal information
- Born: September 3, 1997 (age 29); Alameda, California, U.S.
- Listed height: 6 ft 5 in (1.96 m)
- Listed weight: 325 lb (147 kg)

Career information
- High school: El Cerrito (El Cerrito, California)
- College: Notre Dame (2017–2020)
- NFL draft: 2021: 2nd round, 48th overall pick

Career history
- San Francisco 49ers (2021–2024); Green Bay Packers (2025–present)

Awards and highlights
- Consensus All-American (2020); First-team All-ACC (2020)

Career NFL statistics as of Week 10, 2026
- Games played: 73
- Games started: 60
- Stats at Pro Football Reference

Aaron Banks (born September 3, 1997) is an American professional football guard for the Green Bay Packers of the National Football League (NFL). He played college football for the Notre Dame Fighting Irish and was selected by the San Francisco 49ers in the second round of the 2021 NFL draft.

== Early life ==
Banks grew up in Alameda, California, and attended El Cerrito High School. Banks was rated a four-star recruit and committed to play college football at Notre Dame over offers from Arizona, Arizona State, Oregon, UCLA, Baylor, Florida, Michigan and Miami. Banks lettered in football and basketball all four years of high school. He is a member of 2013–14 NCS Division 3 Champion Football Team, the first in school history. His freshman year he played with UCLA standout Adarius Pickett, Arizona State standouts Jalen Harvey and DJ Calhoun, who were all seniors at the time. He was coached by Kenny Kahn, the late George Austin, and by Michael Booker.

== College career ==
Banks did not play in any games as a true freshman, preserving his NCAA eligibility for an extra year. He played in all 13 of Notre Dame's games and started the final six as a sophomore. He started all 13 of the Fighting Irish's games as a junior. As a senior Banks again started every game for Notre Dame and was named first-team All-Atlantic Coast Conference.

== Professional career ==
Pre-draft measurables
Height	Weight	Arm length	Hand span	Wingspan	40-yard dash	10-yard split	20-yard split	20-yard shuttle	Three-cone drill	Vertical jump	Broad jump	Bench press
6 ft 5 3/8 in (1.97 m)	325 lb (147 kg)	33 1/4 in (0.84 m)	10 in (0.25 m)	6 ft 8 3/4 in (2.05 m)	5.34 s	1.91 s	3.00 s	4.92 s	7.73 s	31.0 in (0.79 m)	8 ft 4 in (2.54 m)	24 reps
All values from Pro Day

=== San Francisco 49ers ===
Banks was selected by the San Francisco 49ers in the second round (48th overall) of the 2021 NFL draft. On May 13, 2021, Banks officially signed with San Francisco on a deal worth $7.07 million. As a rookie, he appeared in nine games in the 2021 season. In the 2022 season, he appeared in and started 16 games. In the 2023 season, he appeared in 15 games and started 14.

Banks was a starter in Super Bowl LVIII. The 49ers lost to the Chiefs 25–22 in overtime.

On December 30, 2024, Banks was placed on injured reserve. In the 2024 season, he appeared in and started 13 games.

=== Green Bay Packers ===
On March 18, 2025, Banks signed a four-year, $77 million contract with the Green Bay Packers.
