= 2020 Atlantic Coast Conference football season =

2020 ACC Football season
- League: NCAA Division I Football Bowl Subdivision
- Sport: Football
- Duration: September 3, 2020, to January 2, 2021
- Teams: 15
- TV partner(s): ESPN Family, (ABC, ESPN, ESPN2, ACC Network), Fox Sports Networks

2021 NFL Draft
- Top draft pick: Trevor Lawrence – (Clemson)
- Picked by: Jacksonville Jaguars, 1st overall

Regular season
- Season champions: Notre Dame
- Runners-up: Clemson

ACC Championship Game
- Champions: Clemson
- Runners-up: Notre Dame
- Finals MVP: Trevor Lawrence, Clemson

Seasons
- ← 2019 2021 →

2020 Atlantic Coast Conference football standings
	Conf.			Overall
Team	W		L	W		L
No. 5 Notre Dame y^	9	–	0	10	–	2
No. 3 Clemson y$^	8	–	1	10	–	2
No. 22 Miami (FL)	7	–	2	8	–	3
No. 18 North Carolina	7	–	3	8	–	4
NC State	7	–	3	8	–	4
Boston College	5	–	5	6	–	5
Pittsburgh	5	–	5	6	–	5
Virginia Tech	5	–	5	5	–	6
Virginia	4	–	5	5	–	5
Wake Forest	3	–	4	4	–	5
Georgia Tech	3	–	6	3	–	7
Louisville	3	–	7	4	–	7
Florida State	2	–	6	3	–	6
Duke	1	–	9	2	–	9
Syracuse	1	–	9	1	–	10
Championship: Clemson 34, Notre Dame 10
^ – College Football Playoff participant; $ – Conference champion; y – Championship game participant; Rankings from AP Poll.

The 2020 Atlantic Coast Conference football season, part of the 2020 NCAA Division I FBS football season, was the 68th season of college football play for the Atlantic Coast Conference (ACC). It began on September 3, 2020, and ended in January 2021. For 2020, the ACC consisted of 15 members in one division.

The original 2020 schedule was released on January 22, 2020. On July 29, a revised concept of the schedule was released in the wake of the COVID-19 pandemic. It was announced that teams would play a ten-game conference schedule, which would include Notre Dame. An option was left for one out-of-conference game, provided that game was played in the home state of the ACC school.

== Preseason ==
=== ACC Kickoff ===
Due to the COVID-19 pandemic, the ACC announced that its 2020 Football Kickoff would be held virtually instead of at the Westin in Charlotte, North Carolina. The Kickoff was scheduled for July 21–23, 2020. On July 13, it was announced that the Kickoff was postponed until further notice. On September 4, 2020, the ACC Preseason Media Poll was released.

Predicted finish	Team	Votes (1st place)
1	Clemson	2,008 (132)
2	Notre Dame	1,824 (2)
3	North Carolina	1,682
4	Louisville	1,434
5	Virginia Tech	1,318
6	Miami	1,280
7	Florida State	1,177
8	Pittsburgh	1,132
9	Virginia	994
10	Wake Forest	659
11	NC State	634
12	Duke	618
13	Boston College	532
14	Syracuse	449
15	Georgia Tech	339

==== Preseason ACC Player of the Year ====
Ranking	Player	Position	Team	Votes
1	Trevor Lawrence	QB	Clemson	100
2	Travis Etienne	RB	Clemson	30
3	Sam Howell	QB	North Carolina	1
3	Chazz Surratt	LB	North Carolina	1
3	Ian Book	QB	Notre Dame	1
3	Carlos Basham Jr.	DE	Wake Forest	1

==== Preseason All-Conference Teams ====
===== Offense =====
Position	Player	School	Votes
Wide receiver	Tamorrion Terry	Florida State	100
Wide receiver	Tutu Atwell	Louisville	96
Wide receiver	Dazz Newsome	North Carolina	75
Tight end	Brevin Jordan	Miami	77
Advanced Playmaker	Michael Carter	North Carolina	82
Tackle	Jackson Carman	Clemson	64
Tackle	Ben Petrula	Boston College	61
Guard	Zion Johnson	Boston College	78
Guard	Aaron Banks	Notre Dame	34
Center	Jimmy Morrissey	Pittsburgh	80
Quarterback	Trevor Lawrence	Clemson	131
Running back	Travis Etienne	Clemson	133
Running back	Javian Hawkins	Louisville	80

===== Defense =====
Position	Player	School	Votes
Defensive end	Carlos Basham Jr.	Wake Forest	89
Defensive end	Patrick Jones II	Pittsburgh	37
Defensive tackle	Marvin Wilson	Florida State	108
Defensive tackle	Tyler Davis	Clemson	75
Linebacker	Chazz Surratt	North Carolina	106
Linebacker	Rayshard Ashby	Virginia Tech	66
Linebacker	Jeremiah Owusu-Koramoah	Notre Dame	47
Cornerback	Asante Samuel Jr.	Florida State	90
Cornerback	Derion Kendrick	Clemson	85
Safety	Paris Ford	Pittsburgh	62
Safety	Hamsah Nasirildeen	Florida State	56

===== Specialist =====
Position	Player	School	Votes
Placekicker	Nick Sciba	Wake Forest	69
Punter	Trenton Gill	NC State	43
Specialist	Damond Philyaw-Johnson	Duke	48

=== Recruiting classes ===
Rankings
Team	ESPN	Rivals	24/7	Signees
Boston College	60	63	65	13
Clemson	1	1	1	23
Duke	42	58	53	17
Florida State	22	22	21	18
Georgia Tech	27	23	26	24
Louisville	33	37	39	25
Miami	19	16	17	19
North Carolina	17	17	19	26
NC State	31	45	42	19
Pittsburgh	44	47	41	17
Syracuse	58	53	58	19
Virginia	48	55	50	14
Virginia Tech	70	80	63	15
Wake Forest	54	58	57	19

== Coaches ==
=== Coaching changes ===
The ACC entered the 2020 season with two new head football coaches:

- On November 4, 2019, Florida State head coach Willie Taggart was fired and replaced by Mike Norvell on December 7, 2019.
- On December 1, 2019, Boston College head coach Steve Addazio was fired after seven seasons and a starting the season 2–8. Jeff Hafley was named head coach on December 14, 2019.

=== Head coaching records ===
Team	Head coach	Years at school	Overall record	Record at school	ACC record
Boston College	Jeff Hafley	1	0–0	0–0	0–0
Clemson	Dabo Swinney	13	130–31	130–31	77–16
Duke	David Cutcliffe	13	116–108	72–79	34–62
Florida State	Mike Norvell	1	38–15	0–0	0–0
Georgia Tech	Geoff Collins	2	18–19	3–9	2–6
Louisville	Scott Satterfield	2	59–29	8–5	5–3
Miami	Manny Diaz	2	6–7	6–7	4–4
North Carolina	Mack Brown	12	251–128–1	76–52–1	44–39–1
North Carolina State	Dave Doeren	8	70–46	47–42	21–35
Pittsburgh	Pat Narduzzi	6	36–29	36–29	24–16
Syracuse	Dino Babers	5	60–42	23–26	12–20
Virginia	Bronco Mendenhall	5	124–70	25–27	14–18
Virginia Tech	Justin Fuente	5	59–43	33–20	20–12
Wake Forest	Dave Clawson	7	126–119	36–40	16–32

Notes

- Records shown are prior to the 2020 season
- Years at school includes the 2020 season

== Rankings ==
Legend
	Improvement in ranking
	Drop in ranking
	Not ranked previous week
RV	Received votes but were not ranked in Top 25 of poll

		Pre	Wk 2	Wk 3	Wk 4	Wk 5	Wk 6	Wk 7	Wk 8	Wk 9	Wk 10	Wk 11	Wk 12	Wk 13	Wk 14	Wk 15	Wk 16	Final
Boston College	AP			RV			RV	RV										
Boston College	C			RV	RV	RV	RV	RV	RV	RV	RV	RV	RV	RV				
Boston College	CFP	Not released																
Clemson	AP	1 (38)	1 (60)	1 (59)	1 (55)	1 (52)	1 (59)	1 (54)	1 (52)	1 (33)	4	4	4	4	4	4	2	3
Clemson	C	1 (38)	1 (37)	1 (44)	1 (42)	1 (46)	1 (55)	1 (52)	1 (52)	1 (43)	4	4	4	3	3	3	2	3
Clemson	CFP	Not released											3	3	3	3	2	
Duke	AP																	
Duke	C	RV	RV															
Duke	CFP	Not released																
Florida State	AP	RV	RV															
Florida State	C							RV										
Florida State	CFP	Not released																
Georgia Tech	AP		RV															
Georgia Tech	C		RV	RV														
Georgia Tech	CFP	Not released																
Louisville	AP	RV	18	24	RV													
Louisville	C	RV	16	RV														
Louisville	CFP	Not released																
Miami	AP	RV	17	12	8	7	13	11	12	11	9	12	10	9	9	19	18	22
Miami	C	RV	18	14	8	7	12	11	12	10	9	9	9	9	8	19	18	22
Miami	CFP	Not released											10	10	10	18	18	
North Carolina	AP	18	12	11	12	8	5	14	15	RV	RV	RV	25	RV	20	16	14	18
North Carolina	C	19	11	12	11	9	6	13	13	24	RV	24	23	RV	20	15	14	17
North Carolina	CFP	Not released											19	17	17	15	13	
NC State	AP					RV	RV	23						RV	RV	24	24	RV
NC State	C			RV		RV	RV	22	RV	RV			RV	RV	24	23	22	RV
NC State	CFP	Not released													23	22	23	
Notre Dame	AP	10	7	7	5	5	4	3	4	4	2	2	2	2	2	2	4	5
Notre Dame	C	10	7	7	5	5	4	3	4	4	2	2	2	2	2	2 (2)	4	5
Notre Dame	CFP	Not released											2	2	2	2	4	
Pittsburgh	AP		25	21	24	RV												
Pittsburgh	C	RV	RV	RV	25	RV												
Pittsburgh	CFP	Not released																
Syracuse	AP																	
Syracuse	C																	
Syracuse	CFP	Not released																
Virginia	AP	RV	RV	RV	RV	RV	RV											
Virginia	C	RV	RV	RV	RV	RV												
Virginia	CFP	Not released																
Virginia Tech	AP	RV	20	20	RV	19	23	19		RV								
Virginia Tech	C	24	19	24	23	18	23	20	RV	RV	RV							
Virginia Tech	CFP	Not released																
Wake Forest	AP									RV	RV							
Wake Forest	C								RV	RV	RV							
Wake Forest	CFP	Not released																

== Schedule ==
Index to colors and formatting
ACC member won
ACC member lost
ACC teams in **bold**

=== Regular season ===
The regular season began on September 10 and ended on December 5. The ACC Championship game was played on December 19.

==== Week one ====
Date	Time	Visiting team	Home team	Site	TV	Result	Attendance	Ref.
September 10	8:00 p.m.	UAB	**Miami (FL)**	Hard Rock Stadium • Miami Gardens, FL	ACCN	**W** 31–14	8,153	
September 12	12:00 p.m.	**Syracuse**	No. 18 **North Carolina**	Kenan Memorial Stadium • Chapel Hill, NC	ACCN	**UNC** 31–6	0 (Behind closed doors)	
September 12	2:30 p.m.	**Duke**	No. 10 **Notre Dame**	Notre Dame Stadium • Notre Dame, IN	NBC	**ND** 27–13	10,097	
September 12	3:30 p.m.	**Georgia Tech**	**Florida State**	Doak Campbell Stadium • Tallahassee, FL	ABC	**GT** 16–13	17,538	
September 12	4:00 p.m.	Austin Peay	**Pittsburgh**	Heinz Field • Pittsburgh, PA	ACCN	**W** 55–0	0 (Behind closed doors)	
September 12	7:30 p.m.	No. 1 **Clemson**	**Wake Forest**	Truist Field at Wake Forest • Winston-Salem, NC (College GameDay)	ABC	**CLEM** 37–13	68	
September 12	8:00 p.m.	Western Kentucky	**Louisville**	Cardinal Stadium • Louisville, KY	ACCN	**W** 35–21	11,179	
^{#}Rankings from AP Poll released prior to game. All times are in Eastern Time.

Date	Bye Week			
September 12	Boston College	NC State	Virginia	Virginia Tech

==== Week two ====
Date	Time	Visiting team	Home team	Site	TV	Result	Attendance	Ref.
September 19	12:00 p.m.	**Syracuse**	No. 25 **Pittsburgh**	Heinz Field • Pittsburgh, PA (rivalry)	ACCN	**PITT** 21–10	0 (Behind closed doors)	
September 19	12:00 p.m.	**Boston College**	**Duke**	Wallace Wade Stadium • Durham, NC	RSN	**BC** 26–6	0 (Behind closed doors)	
September 19	2:30 p.m.	South Florida	No. 7 **Notre Dame**	Notre Dame Stadium • South Bend, IN	USA	**W** 52–0	10,085	
September 19	3:30 p.m.	No. 14 UCF	**Georgia Tech**	Bobby Dodd Stadium • Atlanta, GA	ABC	**L** 21–49	11,000	
September 19	4:00 p.m.	The Citadel	No. 1 **Clemson**	Memorial Stadium • Clemson, SC	ACCN	**W** 49–0	18,609	
September 19	7:30 p.m.	No. 17 **Miami (FL)**	No. 18 **Louisville**	Cardinal Stadium • Louisville, KY (College GameDay)	ABC	**MIA** 47–34	12,120	
September 19	8:00 p.m.	**Wake Forest**	**NC State**	Carter–Finley Stadium • Raleigh, NC (rivalry)	ACCN	**NCSU** 45–42	0 (Behind closed doors)	
^{†}Homecoming. ^{#}Rankings from AP Poll released prior to game. All times are in Eastern Time.

Date	Bye Week			
September 19	Florida State	North Carolina	Virginia	No. 20 Virginia Tech

==== Week three ====
Date	Time	Visiting team	Home team	Site	TV	Result	Attendance	Ref.
September 26	12:00 p.m.	No. 24 **Louisville**	No. 21 **Pittsburgh**	Heniz Field • Pittsburgh, PA	ACCN	**PITT** 23–20	0 (Behind closed doors)	
September 26	12:00 p.m.	**Georgia Tech**	**Syracuse**	Carrier Dome • Syracuse, NY	RSN	**CUSE** 37–20	0 (Behind closed doors)	
September 26 (Note: This game has been rescheduled from November 14, due to positive COVID-19 tests on Virginia Tech football team.)	4:00 p.m.	**Duke**	**Virginia**	Scott Stadium • Charlottesville, VA	ACCN	**UVA** 38–20	1,000	
September 26	6:00 p.m.	Texas State	**Boston College**	Alumni Stadium • Chestnut Hill, MA	RSN	**W** 24–21	0 (Behind closed doors)	
September 26	7:30 p.m.	**Florida State**	No. 12 **Miami (FL)**	Hard Rock Stadium • Miami Gardens, FL (rivalry, College GameDay)	ABC	**MIA** 52–10	12,806	
September 26 (Note: This game has been rescheduled from September 12, due to positive COVID-19 tests on the NC State team.)	8:00 p.m.	**NC State**	No. 20 **Virginia Tech**	Lane Stadium • Blacksburg, VA	ACCN	**VT** 45–24	1,000	
^{†}Homecoming. ^{#}Rankings from AP Poll released prior to game. All times are in Eastern Time.

Date	Bye Week			
September 26	Clemson	North Carolina	No. 7 Notre Dame	Wake Forest

==== Week four ====
Date	Time	Visiting team	Home team	Site	TV	Result	Attendance	Ref.
October 2	7:00 p.m.	Campbell	**Wake Forest**	Truist Stadium at Wake Forest • Winston-Salem, NC	ACCN	**W** 66–14	0 (Behind closed doors)	
October 3	12:00 p.m.	**NC State**	No. 24 **Pittsburgh**	Heinz Field • Pittsburgh, PA	ACCN	**NCSU** 30–29	0 (Behind closed doors)	
October 3	3:30 p.m.	No. 12 **North Carolina**	**Boston College**	Alumni Stadium • Chestnut Hill, MA	ABC	**UNC** 26–22	0 (Behind closed doors)	
October 3	4:00 p.m.	**Virginia Tech**	**Duke**	Wallace Wade Stadium • Durham, NC	ACCN	**VT** 38–31	0 (Behind closed doors)	
October 3	4:00 p.m.	Jacksonville State	**Florida State**	Doak Campbell Stadium • Tallahassee, Florida	RSN	**W** 41–24	13,589	
October 3	8:00 p.m.	**Virginia**	No. 1 **Clemson**	Memorial Stadium • Clemson, SC	ACCN	**CLEM** 41–23	18,735	
^{#}Rankings from AP Poll released prior to game. All times are in Eastern Time.

Date	Bye Week				
October 3	Georgia Tech	Louisville	No. 8 Miami (FL)	No. 5 Notre Dame	Syracuse

==== Week five ====
Date	Time	Visiting team	Home team	Site	TV	Result	Attendance	Ref.
October 9	7:00 p.m.	**Louisville**	**Georgia Tech**	Bobby Dodd Stadium • Atlanta, GA	ESPN	**GT** 46–27	11,000	
October 10	12:00 p.m.	No. 19 **Virginia Tech**	No. 8 **North Carolina**	Kenan Memorial Stadium • Chapel Hill, NC	ABC	**UNC** 56–45	3,535	
October 10	12:00 p.m.	**NC State**	**Virginia**	Scott Stadium • Charlottesville, VA	ACCN	**NCSU** 38–21	1,000	
October 10	12:30 p.m.	**Duke**	**Syracuse**	Carrier Dome • Syracuse, NY	RSN	**DUKE** 38–24	0 (Behind closed doors)	
October 10	4:00 p.m.	**Pittsburgh**	**Boston College**	Alumni Stadium • Chestnut Hill, MA	ACCN	**BC** 31–30 ^{OT}	0 (Behind closed doors)	
October 10	7:30 p.m.	**Florida State**	No. 5 **Notre Dame**	Notre Dame Stadium • Notre Dame, IN	NBC	**ND** 42–26	10,409	
October 10	7:30 p.m.	No. 7 **Miami (FL)**	No. 1 **Clemson**	Memorial Stadium • Clemson, SC (College GameDay)	ABC	**CLEM** 42–17	18,885	
^{#}Rankings from AP Poll released prior to game. All times are in Eastern Time.

Date	Bye Week
October 10	Wake Forest

==== Week six ====
Date	Time	Visiting team	Home team	Site	TV	Result	Attendance	Ref.
October 17	12:00 p.m.	Liberty	**Syracuse**	Carrier Dome • Syracuse, NY	RSN	**L** 21–38	0 (Behind closed doors)	
October 17	12:00 p.m.	No. 1 **Clemson**	**Georgia Tech**	Bobby Dodd Stadium • Atlanta, GA (rivalry)	ABC	**CLEM** 73-7	11,000	
October 17	12:00 p.m.	**Pittsburgh**	No. 13 **Miami (FL)**	Hard Rock Stadium • Miami Gardens, FL	ACCN	**MIA** 31–19	9,000	
October 17	2:30 p.m.	**Louisville**	No. 4 **Notre Dame**	Notre Dame Stadium • Notre Dame, IN	NBC	**ND** 12–7	10,182	
October 17	3:30 p.m.	**Duke**	**NC State**	Carter-Finley Stadium • Raleigh, NC (Tobacco Road)	RSN	**NCSU** 31–20	4,032	
October 17	4:00 p.m.	**Virginia**	**Wake Forest**	Truist Field at Wake Forest • Winston-Salem, NC	ACCN	**WAKE** 40–23	2,186	
October 17	7:30 p.m.	No. 5 **North Carolina**	**Florida State**	Doak Campbell Stadium • Tallahassee, FL	ABC	**FSU** 31–28	18,016	
October 17	8:00 p.m.	**Boston College**	No. 23 **Virginia Tech**	Lane Stadium • Blacksburg, VA	ACCN	**VT** 40–14	1,000	
^{#}Rankings from AP Poll released prior to game. All times are in Eastern Time.

==== Week seven ====
Date	Time	Visiting team	Home team	Site	TV	Result	Attendance	Ref.
October 24	12:00 p.m.	**Syracuse**	No. 1 **Clemson**	Memorial Stadium • Clemson, SC	ACCN	**CLEM** 47–21	18,629	
October 24	12:00 p.m.	No. 23 **NC State**	No. 14 **North Carolina**	Kenan Memorial Stadium • Chapel Hill, NC (rivalry)	ESPN	**UNC** 48–21	3,535	
October 24	12:00 p.m.	**Florida State**	**Louisville**	Cardinal Stadium • Louisville, KY	RSN	**LOU** 48–16	11,465	
October 24	3:30 p.m.	No. 3 **Notre Dame**	**Pittsburgh**	Heinz Field • Pittsburgh, PA (rivalry)	ABC	**ND** 45–3	5,451	
October 24	3:30 p.m.	No. 19 **Virginia Tech**	**Wake Forest**	Truist Field at Wake Forest • Winston-Salem, NC	RSN	**WF** 23–16	2,135	
October 24	4:00 p.m.	**Georgia Tech**	**Boston College**	Alumni Stadium • Chestnut Hill, MA	ACCN	**BC** 48–27	0 (Behind closed doors)	
October 24	8:00 p.m.	**Virginia**	No. 11 **Miami (FL)**	Hard Rock Stadium • Miami Gardens, FL	ACCN	**MIA** 19–14	9,940	
^{#}Rankings from AP Poll released prior to game. All times are in Eastern Time.

Date	Bye Week
October 24	Duke

==== Week eight ====
Date	Time	Visiting team	Home team	Site	TV	Result	Attendance	Ref.
October 31	12:00 p.m.	**Boston College**	No. 1 **Clemson**	Memorial Stadium • Clemson, SC (O'Rourke–McFadden Trophy)	ABC	**CLEM** 34–28	18,690	
October 31	12:00 p.m.	**Wake Forest**	**Syracuse**	Carrier Dome • Syracuse, NY	ACCN	**WAKE** 38–14	0 (Behind closed doors)	
October 31	3:30 p.m.	No. 4 **Notre Dame**	**Georgia Tech**	Bobby Dodd Stadium • Atlanta, GA	ABC	**ND** 31–13	11,000	
October 31	4:00 p.m.	**Virginia Tech**	**Louisville**	Cardinal Stadium • Louisville, KY	ACCN	**VT** 42–35	11,901	
October 31	7:00 p.m.	Charlotte	**Duke**	Wallace Wade Stadium • Durham, NC	RSN	**W** 53–19	0 (Behind closed doors)	
October 31	8:00 p.m.	No. 15 **North Carolina**	**Virginia**	Scott Stadium • Charlottesville, VA (South's Oldest Rivalry)	ACCN	**UVA** 44–41	1,000	
^{#}Rankings from AP Poll released prior to game. All times are in Eastern Time.

Date	Bye Week			
October 31	Florida State	No. 12 Miami (FL)	NC State	Pittsburgh

==== Week nine ====
Date	Time	Visiting team	Home team	Site	TV	Result	Attendance	Ref.
November 6	7:30 p.m.	No. 11 **Miami (FL)**	**NC State**	Carter–Finley Stadium • Raleigh, NC	ESPN	**MIA** 44–41	4,032	
November 7	12:00 p.m.	**North Carolina**	**Duke**	Wallace Wade Stadium • Durham, NC (Victory Bell)	ESPN2	**UNC** 56–24	0 (Behind closed doors)	
November 7	12:00 p.m.	Liberty	**Virginia Tech**	Lane Stadium • Blacksburg, VA	ACCN	**L** 35–38	1,000	
November 7	2:00 p.m.	**Boston College**	**Syracuse**	Carrier Dome • Syracuse, NY (rivalry)	RSN	**BC** 16–13	0 (Behind closed doors)	
November 7	4:00 p.m.	**Pittsburgh**	**Florida State**	Doak Campbell Stadium • Tallahassee, FL	ACCN	**PITT** 41–17	16,568	
November 7	7:30 p.m.	No. 1 **Clemson**	No. 4 **Notre Dame**	Notre Dame Stadium • South Bend, IN (College GameDay)	NBC	**ND** 47–40 ^{2OT}	11,011	
^{#}Rankings from AP Poll released prior to game. All times are in Eastern Time.

Date	Bye Week			
November 7	Georgia Tech	Louisville	Virginia	Wake Forest

==== Week ten ====
Date	Time	Visiting team	Home team	Site	TV	Result	Attendance	Ref.
November 14	12:00 p.m.	No. 9 **Miami (FL)**	**Virginia Tech**	Lane Stadium • Blacksburg, VA	ESPN2	**MIA** 25–24	1,000	
November 14	12:00 p.m.	**Wake Forest**	**North Carolina**	Kenan Memorial Stadium • Chapel Hill, NC (Tobacco Road)	ACCN	**UNC** 59–53	3,535	
November 14	3:30 p.m.	No. 2 **Notre Dame**	**Boston College**	Alumni Stadium • Chestnut Hill, MA (Holy War)	ABC	**ND** 45–31	0 (Behind closed doors)	
November 14	3:30 p.m.	**Louisville**	**Virginia**	Scott Stadium • Charlottesville, VA	ACCN	**UVA** 31–17	1,000	
November 14	7:30 p.m.	**Florida State**	**NC State**	Carter-Finley Stadium • Raleigh, NC	ACCN	**NCSU** 38–22	4,032	
^{#}Rankings from AP Poll released prior to game. All times are in Eastern Time.

Date	Bye Week				
November 14	No. 4 Clemson	Duke	Georgia Tech	Syracuse	Pittsburgh

==== Week eleven ====
Date	Time	Visiting team	Home team	Site	TV	Result	Attendance	Ref.
November 20	7:30 p.m.	**Syracuse**	**Louisville**	Cardinal Stadium • Louisville, KY	ESPN	**LOU** 30–0	11,192	
November 21	4:00 p.m.	Abilene Christian	**Virginia**	Scott Stadium • Charlotteville, VA	RSN	**W** 55–15	250	
November 21	4:00 p.m.	**Virginia Tech**	**Pittsburgh**	Heinz Field • Pittsburgh, PA	ACCN	**PITT** 47–14	4,612	
November 21	7:30 p.m.	No. 21 Liberty	**NC State**	Carter-Finley Stadium • Raleigh, NC	RSN	**W** 15–14	4,032	
^{#}Rankings from AP Poll released prior to game. All times are in Eastern Time.

Date	Bye Week								
November 21	Boston College	No. 4 Clemson	Duke	Georgia Tech	Florida State	No. 12 Miami (FL)	North Carolina	No. 2 Notre Dame	Wake Forest

==== Week twelve ====
Date	Time	Visiting team	Home team	Site	TV	Result	Attendance	Ref.
November 27	3:30 p.m.	No. 2 **Notre Dame**	No. 19 **North Carolina**	Kenan Memorial Stadium • Chapel Hill, NC	ABC	**ND** 31–17	3,535	
November 28	12:00 p.m.	**NC State**	**Syracuse**	Carrier Dome • Syracuse, NY	ACCN	**NCSU** 36–29	0 (Behind closed doors)	
November 28	3:30 p.m.	**Pittsburgh**	No. 3 **Clemson**	Memorial Stadium • Clemson, SC	ABC	**CLEM** 52–17	18,819	
November 28	4:00 p.m.	**Louisville**	**Boston College**	Alumni Stadium • Chestnut Hill, MA	ACCN	**BC** 34–27	0 (Behind closed doors)	
November 28	7:00 p.m.	**Duke**	**Georgia Tech**	Bobby Dodd Stadium • Atlanta, GA	RSN	**GT** 56–33	11,000	
^{#}Rankings from College Football Playoff. All times are in Eastern Time.

Date	Bye Week				
November 28	Florida State	No. 10 Miami (FL)	Virginia	Virginia Tech	Wake Forest

==== Week thirteen ====
Date	Time	Visiting team	Home team	Site	TV	Result	Attendance	Ref.
December 5	12:00 p.m.	Western Carolina	No. 17 **North Carolina**	Kenan Memorial Stadium • Chapel Hill, NC	ACCN	**W** 49–9	3,535	
December 5	2:30 p.m.	**Syracuse**	No. 2 **Notre Dame**	Notre Dame Stadium • Notre Dame, IN	NBC	**ND** 45–21	6,831	
December 5	3:30 p.m.	**Boston College**	**Virginia**	Scott Stadium • Charlottesville, VA	RSN	**UVA** 43–32	250	
December 5	4:00 p.m.	**Georgia Tech**	**NC State**	Carter-Finley Stadium • Raleigh, NC	ACCN	**NCSU** 23–13	4,032	
December 5	7:30 p.m.	No. 3 **Clemson**	**Virginia Tech**	Lane Stadium • Blacksburg, VA	ABC	**CLEM** 45–10	250	
December 5	8:00 p.m.	No. 10 **Miami (FL)**	**Duke**	Wallace Wade Stadium • Durham, NC	ACCN	**MIA** 48–0	0 (Behind closed doors)	
^{#}Rankings from College Football Playoff. All times are in Eastern Time.

Date	Bye Week			
December 5	Florida State	Louisville	Pittsburgh	Wake Forest

==== Week fourteen ====
Date	Time	Visiting team	Home team	Site	TV	Result	Attendance	Ref.
December 10	7:00 p.m.	**Pittsburgh**	**Georgia Tech**	Bobby Dodd Stadium • Atlanta, GA	RSN	**PITT** 34–20	11,000	
December 12	12:00 p.m.	**Wake Forest**	**Louisville**	Cardinal Stadium • Louisville, KY	ACCN	**LOU** 45–21	10,959	
December 12	3:30 p.m.	No. 17 **North Carolina**	No. 10 **Miami (FL)**	Hard Rock Stadium • Miami Gardens, FL	ABC	**UNC** 62–26	12,092	
December 12	4:00 p.m.	**Duke**	**Florida State**	Doak Campbell Stadium • Tallahassee, FL	ACCN	**FSU** 56–35	14,872	
December 12	8:00 p.m.	**Virginia**	**Virginia Tech**	Lane Stadium • Blacksburg, VA (Commonwealth Cup)	ACCN	**VT** 33–15	250	
^{#}Rankings from College Football Playoff. All times are in Eastern Time.

Date	Bye Week				
December 12	Boston College	No. 3 Clemson	No. 23 NC State	No. 2 Notre Dame	Syracuse

=== Championship game ===
Date	Time	Visiting team	Home team	Site	TV	Result	Attendance	Ref.
December 19	4:00 p.m.	No. 3 **Clemson**	No. 2 **Notre Dame**	Bank of America Stadium • Charlotte, NC (College GameDay)	ABC	**CLEM** 34–10	5,240	
^{#}Rankings from College Football Playoff. All times are in Eastern Time.

== ACC vs other conferences ==
=== ACC vs Power 5 matchups ===
The other Power 5 conferences (Big 10, Big 12, Pac-12, and SEC) announced a conference-only schedule model, and no ACC team played another Power 5 team during the regular season.

=== ACC vs Group of Five matchups ===
The following games featured ACC teams competing against teams from the American, C-USA, MAC, Mountain West, or Sun Belt.

Index to colors and formatting
ACC member won
ACC member lost
ACC teams in **bold**

Date	Conference	Visitor	Home	Site	Score
September 10	C-USA	UAB	Miami (FL)	Hard Rock Stadium • Miami Gardens, FL	**W** 31–14
September 12	C-USA	Western Kentucky	Louisville	Cardinal Stadium • Louisville, KY	**W** 35–21
September 19	American	UCF	Georgia Tech	Bobby Dodd Stadium • Atlanta, GA	**L** 21–49
September 19	American	South Florida	Notre Dame	Notre Dame Stadium • South Bend, IN	**W** 52–0
September 26	Sun Belt	Texas State	Boston College	Alumni Stadium • Chestnut Hill, MA	**W** 24–21
October 31	C-USA	Charlotte	Duke	Wallace Wade Stadium • Durham, NC	**W** 53–19

=== ACC vs FBS independents matchups ===
The following games featured ACC teams competing against FBS Independents, which included Army, Liberty, New Mexico State, UConn, and UMass.

Index to colors and formatting
ACC member won
ACC member lost
ACC teams in **bold**

Date	Visitor	Home	Site	Score
October 17	Liberty	**Syracuse**	Carrier Dome • Syracuse, NY	**L** 21–38
November 7	Liberty	**Virginia Tech**	Lane Stadium • Blacksburg, VA	**L** 35–38
November 21	Liberty	**NC State**	Carter-Finley Stadium • Raleigh, NC	**W** 15–14

=== ACC vs FCS matchups ===
Index to colors and formatting
ACC member won
ACC member lost
ACC teams in **bold**

Date	Visitor	Home	Site	Score
September 12	Austin Peay	Pittsburgh	Heinz Field • Pittsburgh, PA	**W** 55–0
September 19	The Citadel	Clemson	Memorial Stadium • Clemson, SC	**W** 49–0
October 2	Campbell	Wake Forest	Truist Field at Wake Forest • Winston-Salem, NC	**W** 66–14
October 3	Jacksonville State	Florida State	Doak Campbell Stadium • Tallahassee, FL	**W** 41–24
November 21	Abilene Christian	Virginia	Scott Stadium • Charlottesville, VA	**W** 55–15
December 5	Western Carolina	North Carolina	Kenan Memorial Stadium • Chapel Hill, NC	**W** 49–9

=== Records against other conferences ===
**Regular season**

Power 5 Conferences	Record
Big Ten	0–0
Big 12	0–0
BYU	0–0
Pac-12	0–0
SEC	0–0
Power 5 Total	0–0
Other FBS Conferences	Record
American	1–1
C–USA	3–0
Independents (Excluding BYU)	1–2
MAC	0–0
Mountain West	0–0
Sun Belt	1–0
Other FBS Total	6–3
FCS Opponents	Record
Football Championship Subdivision	6–0
Total Non-Conference Record	12–3

**Post Season**

Power Conferences 5	Record
Big Ten	0–2
Big 12	0–1
BYU	0–0
Pac-12	0–0
SEC	0–3
Power 5 Total	0–6
Other FBS Conferences	Record
American	0–0
C–USA	0–0
Independents (Excluding BYU)	0–0
MAC	0–0
Mountain West	0–0
Sun Belt	0–0
Other FBS Total	0–0
Total Bowl Record	0–6

== Postseason ==
=== Bowl games ===
Legend
ACC win
ACC loss

Bowl game	Date	Site	Television	Time (EST)	ACC team	Opponent	Score	Attendance
2020 Cheez-It Bowl	December 29	Camping World Stadium • Orlando, FL	ESPN	5:30 p.m.	No. 18 **Miami**	No. 21 Oklahoma State	**L** 34–37	
2020 Duke's Mayo Bowl	December 30	Bank of America Stadium • Charlotte, NC	ESPN	12:00 p.m.	**Wake Forest**	Wisconsin	**L** 28–42	1,500
2021 Gator Bowl	January 2	TIAA Bank Field • Jacksonville, FL	ESPN	12:00 p.m.	No. 23 **NC State**	Kentucky	**L** 21–23	10,422
**New Year's Six bowl games**
2021 Orange Bowl	January 2	Hard Rock Stadium • Miami Gardens, FL	ESPN	8:00 p.m.	No. 13 **North Carolina**	No. 5 Texas A&M	**L** 27–41	13,737
**College Football Playoff bowl games**
Rose Bowl (CFP Semifinal)	January 1	AT&T Stadium • Arlington, TX	ESPN	4:00 p.m.	No. 4 **Notre Dame**	No. 1 Alabama	**L** 14–31	18,373
Sugar Bowl (CFP Semifinal)	January 1	Mercedes-Benz Superdome • New Orleans, LA	ESPN	8:00 p.m.	No. 2 **Clemson**	No. 3 Ohio State	**L** 28–49	3,000

Rankings are from CFP rankings. All times Eastern Time Zone. ACC teams shown in bold.

== Awards and honors ==
=== Player of the week honors ===
Week	Quarterback			Running Back			Offensive Line			Receiver			Defensive Line			Linebacker			Defensive Back			Specialist			Rookie		
Week	Player	Team	Position	Player	Team	Position	Player	Team	Position	Player	Team	Position	Player	Team	Position	Player	Team	Position	Player	Team	Position	Player	Team	Position	Player	Team	Position
Week 1	Trevor Lawrence	Clemson	QB	Kyren Williams	Notre Dame	RB	Corey Gaynor	Miami	C	Braden Smith	Louisville	WR	Curtis Ryans	Georgia Tech	DE	Chazz Surratt	North Carolina	LB	Asante Samuel Jr.	Florida State	DB	Marvin Wilson	Florida State	DT	Jeff Sims	Georgia Tech	QB
Week 2	D'Eriq King	Miami	QB	Ricky Person Jr.	NC State	RB	Ikem Ekwonu	NC State	OG	Zay Flowers	Boston College	WR	Victor Dimukeje	Duke	DE	Cam Bright	Pittsburgh	OLB	Bubba Bolden	Miami	S	José Borregales	Miami	PK	Jahmyr Gibbs	Georgia Tech	RB
Week 2	D'Eriq King	Miami	QB	Ricky Person Jr.	NC State	RB	Robert Hainsey	Notre Dame	OT	Zay Flowers	Boston College	WR	Rashad Weaver	Pittsburgh	DE	Cam Bright	Pittsburgh	OLB	Bubba Bolden	Miami	S	José Borregales	Miami	PK	Jahmyr Gibbs	Georgia Tech	RB
Week 3	D'Eriq King (2)	Miami	QB	Sean Tucker	Syracuse	RB	Brock Hoffman	Virginia Tech	C	Lavel Davis Jr.	Virginia	WR	Patrick Jones II	Pittsburgh	DE	Zane Zandier	Virginia	ILB	Trill Williams	Syracuse	DB	Alex Kessman	Pittsburgh	PK	Lavel Davis Jr.	Virginia	WR
Week 4	Devin Leary	NC State	QB	Khalil Herbert	Virginia Tech	RB	Christian Darrisaw	Virginia Tech	LT	Emeka Emezie	NC State	WR	Emmanuel Belmar	Virginia Tech	DE	Baylon Spector	Clemson	LB	Andrew Booth Jr.	Clemson	DB	Lawrance Toafili	Florida State	RB	Khalil Herbert	Virginia Tech	RB
Week 4	Devin Leary	NC State	QB	Khalil Herbert	Virginia Tech	RB	Cade Stewart	Clemson	C	D. J. Turner	Pittsburgh	WR	Emmanuel Belmar	Virginia Tech	DE	Baylon Spector	Clemson	LB	Andrew Booth Jr.	Clemson	DB	Lawrance Toafili	Florida State	RB	Khalil Herbert	Virginia Tech	RB
Week 5	Trevor Lawrence (2)	Clemson	QB	Michael Carter	North Carolina	RB	Brian Anderson	North Carolina	C	Zay Flowers (2)	Boston College	WR	Patrick Jones II (2)	Pittsburgh	DE	SirVocea Dennis	Pittsburgh	OLB	Bubba Bolden (2)	Miami	S	Charlie Ham	Duke	PK	Jeff Sims (2)	Georgia Tech	QB
Week 5	Phil Jurkovec	Boston College	QB	Michael Carter	North Carolina	RB	Brian Anderson	North Carolina	C	Zay Flowers (2)	Boston College	WR	Patrick Jones II (2)	Pittsburgh	DE	SirVocea Dennis	Pittsburgh	OLB	Bubba Bolden (2)	Miami	S	Charlie Ham	Duke	PK	Jeff Sims (2)	Georgia Tech	QB
Week 6	Trevor Lawrence (3)	Clemson	QB	Kenneth Walker III	Wake Forest	RB	Ikem Ekwonu (2)	NC State	LT	Amari Rodgers	Clemson	WR	Quincy Roche	Miami	DE	Payton Wilson	NC State	LB	Chamarri Conner	Virginia Tech	NB	Lou Hedley	Miami	P	Kyren Williams	Notre Dame	RB
Week 6	Trevor Lawrence (3)	Clemson	QB	Kenneth Walker III	Wake Forest	RB	Doug Nester	Virginia Tech	RG	Amari Rodgers	Clemson	WR	Quincy Roche	Miami	DE	Payton Wilson	NC State	LB	Chamarri Conner	Virginia Tech	NB	Lou Hedley	Miami	P	Kyren Williams	Notre Dame	RB
Week 7	Ian Book	Notre Dame	QB	Javian Hawkins	Louisville	RB	Liam Eichenberg	Notre Dame	LT	Michael Harley	Miami	WR	Carlos Basham Jr.	Wake Forest	DE	Chazz Surratt (2)	North Carolina	LB	Nick Anderson	Wake Forest	S	Will Spiers	Clemson	P	Nick Anderson	Wake Forest	S
Week 8	Sam Howell	North Carolina	QB	Travis Etienne	Clemson	RB	Jackson Carman	Clemson	LT	Dyami Brown	North Carolina	WR	Daelin Hayes	Notre Dame	DE	Charles Snowden	Virginia	OLB	Chamarri Conner (2)	Virginia Tech	CB	Isiah Fisher-Smith	Duke	S	DJ Uiagalelei	Clemson	QB
Week 8	Sam Howell	North Carolina	QB	Travis Etienne	Clemson	RB	Brock Hoffman (2)	Virginia Tech	C	Dyami Brown	North Carolina	WR	Daelin Hayes	Notre Dame	DE	Charles Snowden	Virginia	OLB	Chamarri Conner (2)	Virginia Tech	CB	Isiah Fisher-Smith	Duke	S	DJ Uiagalelei	Clemson	QB
Week 9	D'Eriq King (3)	Miami	QB	Kyren Williams (2)	Notre Dame	RB	Aaron Banks	Notre Dame	OG	Michael Harley (2)	Miami	WR	Jaelan Phillips	Miami	DE	Jeremiah Owusu-Koramoah	Notre Dame	LB	Brandon Hill	Pittsburgh	SS	Zonovan Knight	NC State	RB	DJ Uiagalelei (2)	Clemson	QB
Week 10	Sam Howell (2)	North Carolina	QB	Michael Carter (2)	North Carolina	RB	Tommy Kraemer	Notre Dame	OG	Dazz Newsome	North Carolina	WR	Jaelan Phillips (2)	Miami	DE	Noah Taylor	Virginia	OLB	Shaun Crawford	Notre Dame	S	Lou Hedley (2)	Miami	P	Lavel Davis Jr. (2)	Virginia	WR
Week 10	Sam Howell (2)	North Carolina	QB	Christian Beal-Smith	Wake Forest	RB	Tommy Kraemer	Notre Dame	OG	Dazz Newsome	North Carolina	WR	Jaelan Phillips (2)	Miami	DE	Noah Taylor	Virginia	OLB	Shaun Crawford	Notre Dame	S	Lou Hedley (2)	Miami	P	Lavel Davis Jr. (2)	Virginia	WR
Week 11	Kenny Pickett	Pittsburgh	QB	Zonovan Knight	NC State	RB	Bryce Hargrove	Pittsburgh	LG	D. J. Turner (2)	Pittsburgh	WR	Daniel Joseph	NC State	DE	Isaiah Moore	MLB	NC State	Kei'Trel Clark	CB	Louisville	Alex Kessman (2)	Pittsburgh	PK	Aydan White	NC State	CB
Week 11	Kenny Pickett	Pittsburgh	QB	Zonovan Knight	NC State	RB	Bryce Hargrove	Pittsburgh	LG	D. J. Turner (2)	Pittsburgh	WR	Daniel Joseph	NC State	DE	Isaiah Moore	MLB	NC State	Damar Hamlin	S	Pittsburgh	Alex Kessman (2)	Pittsburgh	PK	Aydan White	NC State	CB
Week 12	Trevor Lawrence (4)	Clemson	QB	Kyren Williams (3)	Notre Dame	RB	Zach Quinney	Georgia Tech	LT	Cornell Powell	Clemson	WR	Jordan Domineck	Georgia Tech	DE	Payton Wilson (2)	NC State	LB	Mario Goodrich	Clemson	CB	Trebor Pena	Syracuse	KR	Jeff Sims (3)	Georgia Tech	QB
Week 12	Trevor Lawrence (4)	Clemson	QB	Kyren Williams (3)	Notre Dame	RB	Liam Eichenberg (2)	Notre Dame	LT	Cornell Powell	Clemson	WR	Jordan Domineck	Georgia Tech	DE	Payton Wilson (2)	NC State	LB	Mario Goodrich	Clemson	CB	Trebor Pena	Syracuse	KR	Jeff Sims (3)	Georgia Tech	QB
Week 13	Dennis Grosel	Boston College	QB	Kyren Williams (4)	Notre Dame	RB	Ryan Swoboda	Virginia	RT	Javon McKinley	Notre Dame	WR	Quincy Roche (2)	Miami	DE	Payton Wilson (3)	NC State	LB	Clarence Lewis	Notre Dame	CB	Christopher Dunn	NC State	PK	Myles Murphy	Clemson	DE
Week 13	Dennis Grosel	Boston College	QB	Sean Tucker	Syracuse	RB	Ryan Swoboda	Virginia	RT	Javon McKinley	Notre Dame	WR	Quincy Roche (2)	Miami	DE	Payton Wilson (3)	NC State	LB	Clarence Lewis	Notre Dame	CB	Porter Wilson	Duke	P	Myles Murphy	Clemson	DE
Week 14
Week 14	Sam Howell (3)	North Carolina	QB	Michael Carter (3)	North Carolina	RB	Joshua Ezeudu	North Carolina	LG	Dyami Brown (2)	North Carolina	WR	Miles Fox	Wake Forest	DT	Jeremiah Gemmel	North Carolina	LB	Hamsah Nasirildeen	Florida State	S	Alex Kessman (3)	Pittsburgh	PK	Jalen Mitchell	Louisville	RB

=== All-Conference teams ===
First Team

Position	Player	Team
First Team Offense
QB	Trevor Lawrence	Clemson
RB	Travis Etienne	Clemson
RB	Michael Carter	North Carolina
WR	Amari Rodgers	Clemson
WR	Dyami Brown	North Carolina
WR	Zay Flowers	Boston College
TE	Hunter Long	Boston College
T	Liam Eichenberg	Notre Dame
T	Christian Darrisaw	Virginia Tech
G	Aaron Banks	Notre Dame
G	Tommy Kraemer	Notre Dame
C	Alec Lindstrom	Boston College
All Purpose Back	Travis Etienne	Clemson
First Team Defense
DE	Patrick Jones II	Pittsburgh
DE	Rashad Weaver	Pittsburgh
DT	Bryan Bresee	Clemson
DT	Alim McNeill	NC State
LB	Chazz Surratt	North Carolina
LB	Jeremiah Owusu-Koramoah	Notre Dame
LB	Payton Wilson	NC State
CB	Asante Samuel Jr.	Florida State
CB	Derion Kendrick	Clemson
S	Divine Deablo	Virginia Tech
S	Kyle Hamilton	Notre Dame
First Team Special Teams
PK	José Borregales	Miami
P	Pressley Harvin III	Georgia Tech
SP	D. J. Turner	Pittsburgh

Second Team

Position	Player	Team
Second Team Offense
QB	Sam Howell	North Carolina
RB	Javonte Williams	North Carolina
RB	Kyren Williams	Notre Dame
WR	Jaquarii Roberson	Wake Forest
WR	Tutu Atwell	Louisville
WR	Dez Fitzpatrick	Louisville
TE	Brevin Jordan	Miami
T	Jackson Carman	Clemson
T	Robert Hainsey	Notre Dame
G	Ben Petrula	Boston College
G	Matt Bockhorst	Clemson
C	Jimmy Morrissey	Pittsburgh
All Purpose Back	Khalil Herbert	Virginia Tech
Second Team Defense
DE	Jaelan Phillips	Miami
DE	Chris Rumph II	Duke
DT	Marvin Wilson	Florida State
DT	Myron Tagovailoa-Amosa	Notre Dame
LB	Isaiah McDuffie	Boston College
LB	James Skalski	Clemson
LB	Charles Snowden	Virginia
CB	Andrew Booth Jr.	Clemson
CB	Kei'Trel Clark	Louisville
S	Nolan Turner	Clemson
S	Bubba Bolden	Miami
S	Damar Hamlin	Pittsburgh
Second Team Special Teams
PK	Alex Kessman	Pittsburgh
P	Lou Hedley	Miami
SP	Nykeim Johnson	Syracuse

Third Team

Position	Player	Team
Third Team Offense
QB	Ian Book	Notre Dame
RB	Khalil Herbert	Virginia Tech
RB	Zonovan Knight	NC State
WR	Mike Harley Jr.	Miami
WR	Taj Harris	Syracuse
WR	Cornell Powell	Clemson
TE	Michael Mayer	Notre Dame
T	Ikem Ekwonu	NC State
T	Zion Johnson	Boston College
G	Joshua Ezeudu	North Carolina
G	Joe Sculthorpe	NC State
C	Jarrett Patterson	Notre Dame
All Purpose Back	Michael Carter	North Carolina
Third Team Defense
DE	Carlos Basham Jr.	Wake Forest
DE	Quincy Roche	Miami
DT	Jarrod Hewitt	Virginia Tech
DT	Miles Fox	Wake Forest
LB	SirVocea Dennis	Pittsburgh
LB	Nick Jackson	Virginia
LB	Max Richardson	Boston College
CB	Nick McCloud	Notre Dame
CB	Ifeatu Melifonwu	Syracuse
S	Michael Carter II	Duke
S	Nick Anderson	Wake Forest
Third Team Special Teams
PK	Nick Sciba	Wake Forest
P	Nolan Cooney	Syracuse
SP	Thayer Thomas	NC State

=== ACC Individual Awards ===
ACC Player of the Year

Trevor Lawrence, Clemson

ACC Rookie of the Year

Kyren Williams, Notre Dame

ACC Coach of the Year

Brian Kelly, Notre Dame

ACC Offensive Player of the Year

Trevor Lawrence, Clemson

ACC Offensive Rookie of the Year

Kyren Williams, Notre Dame

Jacobs Blocking Trophy

Liam Eichenberg, Notre Dame

ACC Defensive Player of the Year

Jeremiah Owusu-Koramoah, Notre Dame

ACC Defensive Rookie of the Year

Bryan Bresee, Clemson

=== All-Americans ===
==== Consensus All-Americans ====
2020 Consensus All-Americans
Unanimous	Consensus
Jeremiah Owusu-Koramoah – Notre Dame; Pressley Harvin III – Georgia Tech; José Borregales – Miami	Liam Eichenberg – Notre Dame; Patrick Jones II – Pittsburgh; Travis Etienne – Clemson

==== Associated Press ====
2020 AP All-Americans
First Team	Second Team	Third Team
Aaron Banks – Notre Dame; Travis Etienne – Clemson; José Borregales – Miami; Rashad Weaver – Pittsburgh; Jeremiah Owusu-Koramoah – Notre Dame; Pressley Harvin III – Georgia Tech	Javonte Williams – North Carolina; Liam Eichenberg – Notre Dame; Christian Darrisaw – Virginia Tech; Hunter Long – Boston College; Jaelan Phillips – Miami; Patrick Jones II – Pittsburgh; Alim McNeill – NC State; Lou Hedley – Miami	Trevor Lawrence – Clemson; Michael Carter – North Carolina; Tommy Kraemer – Notre Dame; Dyami Brown – North Carolina; Kyle Hamilton – Notre Dame

==== AFCA ====
2020 AFCA All-Americans
First Team	Second Team
Liam Eichenberg – Notre Dame; Aaron Banks – Notre Dame; Rashad Weaver – Pittsburgh; Jaelan Phillips – Miami; Jeremiah Owusu-Koramoah – Notre Dame; Pressley Harvin III – Georgia Tech; José Borregales – Miami	Trevor Lawrence – Clemson; Travis Etienne – Clemson; Patrick Jones II – Pittsburgh; Kyle Hamilton – Notre Dame; Nolan Turner – Clemson

==== FWAA ====
2020 FWAA All-Americans
First Team	Second Team
Trevor Lawrence – Clemson; Liam Eichenberg – Notre Dame; Rashad Weaver – Pittsburgh; Jeremiah Owusu-Koramoah – Notre Dame; Kyle Hamilton – Notre Dame; José Borregales – Miami; Pressley Harvin III – Georgia Tech; Travis Etienne – Clemson	Hunter Long – Boston College; Christian Darrisaw – Virginia Tech; Jaelan Phillips – Miami

==== The Sporting News ====
2020 Sporting News All-Americans
First Team	Second Team
Liam Eichenberg – Notre Dame; Travis Etienne – Clemson; Patrick Jones II – Pittsburgh; Jeremiah Owusu-Koramoah – Notre Dame; Chazz Surratt – North Carolina; José Borregales – Miami; Pressley Harvin III – Georgia Tech	Kyren Williams – Notre Dame; Hunter Long – Boston College; Aaron Banks – Notre Dame; Javonte Williams – North Carolina; Rashad Weaver – Pittsburgh

==== WCFF ====
2020 Walter Camp All-Americans
First Team	Second Team
Liam Eichenberg – Notre Dame; José Borregales – Miami; Rashad Weaver – Pittsburgh; Patrick Jones II – Pittsburgh; Jeremiah Owusu-Koramoah – Notre Dame; Pressley Harvin III – Georgia Tech	Christian Darrisaw – Virginia Tech; Aaron Banks – Notre Dame; Trevor Lawrence – Clemson; Travis Etienne – Clemson; Jaelan Phillips – Miami; Kyle Hamilton – Notre Dame

=== National Award Winners ===
- Nolan Cooney – Brian Piccolo Award
- Jeremiah Owusu-Koramoah – Butkus Award

== Home game attendance ==
Due to the COVID-19 pandemic, attendance was limited at all stadiums for the season. Depending on state regulations, some universities did not allow any fans.

Team	Stadium	Capacity	Game 1	Game 2	Game 3	Game 4	Game 5	Game 6	Total	Average
Boston College	Alumni Stadium	44,500	No attendance due to COVID-19							
Clemson	Memorial Stadium	81,500	18,609	18,735	18,885†	18,629	18,690	18,819	112,367	18,728
Duke	Wallace Wade Stadium	40,000	No attendance due to COVID-19							
Florida State	Doak Campbell Stadium	79,560	17,538	13,589	18,016†	16,568	14,872		80,583	16,117
Georgia Tech	Bobby Dodd Stadium	55,000	11,000	11,000	11,000	11,000	11,000	11,000	66,000	11,000
Louisville	Cardinal Stadium	60,800	11,179	12,120†	11,465	11,901	11,192	10,959	68,816	11,469
Miami	Hard Rock Stadium	65,326	8,153	12,806†	9,000	9,940	12,092		51,991	10,398
North Carolina	Kenan Memorial Stadium	50,500	0	3,535	3,535	3,535	3,535	3,535	17,675	3,535
NC State	Carter–Finley Stadium	57,583	350	4,032	4,032	4,032	4,032	4,032	20,510	3,418
Notre Dame	Notre Dame Stadium	77,622	10,097	10,085	10,409	10,182	11,011†	6,831	58,615	9,769
Pittsburgh	Heinz Field	68,400	0	0	0	0	5,451†	4,612	10,063	5,032
Syracuse	Carrier Dome	49,262	No attendance due to COVID-19							
Virginia	Scott Stadium	61,500	0	1,000	1,000	1,000	1,000	250	4,250	708
Virginia Tech	Lane Stadium	65,632	1,000	1,000	1,000	1,000	250	250	4,500	750
Wake Forest	Truist Field at Wake Forest	31,500	68	2,058	2,186†	2,135			6,447	1,612

Bold – Exceeded capacity
†Season High

== NFL draft ==
The following list includes all ACC Players who were drafted in the 2021 NFL draft

Player	Position	School	Draft Round	Round Pick	Overall Pick	Team
Trevor Lawrence	QB	Clemson	1	1	1	Jacksonville Jaguars
Jaelan Phillips	DE	Miami	1	18	18	Miami Dolphins
Caleb Farley	CB	Virginia Tech	1	22	22	Tennessee Titans
Christian Darrisaw	OT	Virginia Tech	1	23	23	Minnesota Vikings
Travis Etienne	RB	Clemson	1	25	25	Jacksonville Jaguars
Gregory Rousseau	DE	Miami	1	30	30	Buffalo Bills
Javonte Williams	RB	North Carolina	2	3	35	Denver Broncos
Jackson Carman	OT	Clemson	2	14	46	Cincinnati Bengals
Asante Samuel Jr.	CB	Florida State	2	15	47	Los Angeles Chargers
Tutu Atwell	WR	Louisville	2	25	57	Los Angeles Rams
Carlos Basham Jr.	DE	Wake Forest	2	29	61	Buffalo Bills
Andre Cisco	S	Syracuse	3	1	65	Jacksonville Jaguars
Alim McNeill	DT	NC State	3	8	72	Detroit Lions
Chazz Surratt	LB	North Carolina	3	14	78	Minnesota Vikings
Divine Deablo	S	Virginia Tech	3	16	80	Las Vegas Raiders
Hunter Long	TE	Boston College	3	17	81	Miami Dolphins
Dyami Brown	WR	North Carolina	3	18	82	Washington Football Team
Amari Rodgers	WR	Clemson	3	21	85	Green Bay Packers
Patrick Jones II	DE	Pittsburgh	3	26	90	Minnesota Vikings
Ifeatu Melifonwu	CB	Syracuse	3	37	101	Detroit Lions
Michael Carter	RB	North Carolina	4	2	107	New York Jets
Dez Fitzpatrick	WR	Louisville	4	4	109	Tennessee Titans
Chris Rumph II	OLB	Duke	4	13	118	Los Angeles Chargers
Janarius Robinson	DE	Florida State	4	29	134	Minnesota Vikings
Rashad Weaver	DE	Pittsburgh	4	30	135	Tennessee Titans
Joshua Kaindoh	DE	Florida State	4	39	144	Kansas City Chiefs
Brevin Jordan	TE	Miami	5	3	147	Houston Texans
Michael Carter II	S	Duke	5	10	154	New York Jets
Noah Gray	TE	Duke	5	18	162	Kansas City Chiefs
Jason Pinnock	CB	Pittsburgh	5	31	175	New York Jets
Cornell Powell	WR	Clemson	5	37	181	Kansas City Chiefs
Hamsah Nasirildeen	S	Florida State	6	2	186	New York Jets
Jaylen Twyman	DT	Pittsburgh	6	15	199	Minnesota Vikings
Jalen Camp	WR	Georgia Tech	6	25	209	Jacksonville Jaguars
Victor Dimukeje	DE	Duke	6	26	210	Arizona Cardinals
Damar Hamlin	S	Pittsburgh	6	28	212	Buffalo Bills
Quincy Roche	OLB	Miami	6	32	216	Pittsburgh Steelers
Khalil Herbert	RB	Virginia Tech	6	33	217	Chicago Bears
Isaiah McDuffie	ILB	Boston College	6	36	220	Green Bay Packers
Dazz Newsome	WR	North Carolina	6	37	221	Chicago Bears
Jimmy Morrissey	C	Pittsburgh	7	2	230	Las Vegas Raiders
Pressley Harvin III	P	Georgia Tech	7	27	254	Pittsburgh Steelers
