= Christian Darrisaw =

American football player (born 1999)

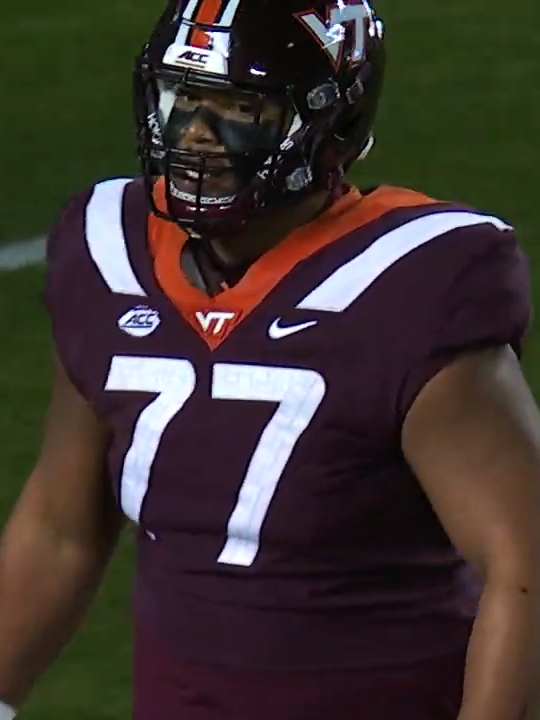
- Darrisaw with the Virginia Tech Hokies in 2020

No. 71 – Minnesota Vikings
- Position: Offensive tackle
- Roster status: Active

Personal information
- Born: June 2, 1999 (age 27); Petersburg, Virginia, U.S.
- Listed height: 6 ft 5 in (1.96 m)
- Listed weight: 315 lb (143 kg)

Career information
- High school: Riverdale Baptist (Upper Marlboro, Maryland)
- College: Virginia Tech (2018–2020)
- NFL draft: 2021: 1st round, 23rd overall pick

Career history
- Minnesota Vikings (2021–present)

Awards and highlights
- First-team All-ACC (2020)

Career NFL statistics as of Week 10, 2026
- Games played: 66
- Games started: 64
- Fumble recoveries: 3
- Stats at Pro Football Reference

Christian Darrisaw (born June 2, 1999) is an American professional football offensive tackle for the Minnesota Vikings of the National Football League (NFL). He played college football for the Virginia Tech Hokies and was selected by the Vikings in the first round of the 2021 NFL draft.

== Early life ==
Darrisaw was born on June 2, 1999, in Petersburg, Virginia. He attended Riverdale Baptist School in Upper Marlboro, Maryland, where he played at left tackle for their football team. He committed to play college football for the Virginia Tech Hokies of Virginia Tech, the only NCAA FBS offer he received, but was assigned by the school to attend Fork Union Military Academy in Fork Union, Virginia for academic reasons.

Darrisaw rejoined Virginia Tech in 2018 and started at left tackle for the Hokies. He would later start every game during the 2019 and 2020 seasons, being named to the first-team All-Atlantic Coast Conference team in the latter.

== Professional career ==
Pre-draft measurables
Height	Weight	Arm length	Hand span	Wingspan
6 ft 4 3/4 in (1.95 m)	322 lb (146 kg)	34 1/4 in (0.87 m)	9 1/4 in (0.23 m)	6 ft 10 1/8 in (2.09 m)
All values from Pro Day

Following the 2020 season, Darrisaw declared for the 2021 NFL draft, in which he was selected by the Minnesota Vikings in the first round with the 23rd overall pick. On May 14, 2021, Darrisaw signed his four-year rookie contract with the Vikings. Darrisaw missed the first four games of his rookie season with a groin injury. As a rookie, he appeared in 12 games and started ten. In the 2022 season, he appeared in and started 14 games. In the 2023 season, he appeared in and started 15 games.

On April 29, 2024, the Vikings picked up the fifth-year option on Darrisaw's contract. On July 23, the Vikings and Darrisaw agreed to a four-year contract extension worth up to $113 million. In Week 8, Darrisaw suffered a torn ACL and MCL in a game against the Los Angeles Rams; he was ruled out for the remainder of the season the next day.

Darrisaw started all 10 of his appearances for Minnesota during the 2025 campaign. On December 19, 2025, Darrisaw was placed on season-ending injured reserve due to lingering knee issues.

=== Regular season statistics ===
Legend
**Bold**	Career high

Year	Team	Games		Offense					
Year	Team	GP	GS	Snaps	Pct	Holding	False start	Decl/Pen	Acpt/Pen
2021	MIN	12	10	653	84%	1	1	0	3
2022	MIN	14	14	853	88%	1	2	0	3
2023	MIN	**15**	**15**	**982**	**99%**	0	4	**2**	5
2024	MIN	7	7	392	93%	1	2	0	4
2025	MIN	10	10	504	83%	0	**7**	0	**7**
Career		58	56	3,384	91%	3	15	2	21
