= José Borregales =

Venezuelan American football player (born 1997)

No. 0
- Position: Placekicker

Personal information
- Born: 15 December 1997 (age 28); Caracas, Venezuela
- Listed height: 5 ft 10 in (1.78 m)
- Listed weight: 185 lb (84 kg)

Career information
- High school: Booker T. Washington (Miami, Florida, U.S.)
- College: FIU (2016–2019); Miami (FL) (2020)
- NFL draft: 2021: undrafted

Career history
- Tampa Bay Buccaneers (2021–2022)*; Orlando Guardians (2023); Winnipeg Blue Bombers (2024)*
- * Offseason or practice squad member only

Awards and highlights
- Lou Groza Award (2020); Unanimous All-American (2020); First-team All-ACC (2020)

José Borregales (born 15 December 1997) is a Venezuelan former professional American football placekicker. He played college football for the FIU Panthers and Miami Hurricanes.

== Early life ==
Borregales attended Booker T. Washington Senior High School and was named a Florida Class 4A first-team selection. He was also named a First-team All Dade selection and a 2015 Kohl's All-American honorable mention. During his high school career, Borregales converted 13 of 14 field goals and 48 of 51 extra points. He committed to Florida International University to play college football.

== College career ==
=== 2016–2019 ===
Borregales redshirted his first year at Florida International University. In 2017, he served as the team's starting kicker. During the 2017 season he connected on 15 of 18 field goals and went 40 for 40 on extra points. In 2018, he finished the season with 14 of 18 field goals and 54 of 55 extra points. Also in 2018, he was finalist for the Lou Groza Award as the nation's best college kicker. However, he fell short of Andre Szmyt in voting. In his final season at FIU, he finished with 21 of 29 field goals and converted all 40 extra point attempts.

=== 2020 ===
After graduating from FIU with a bachelor's degree in 2020, Borregales continued his football kicking career at the University of Miami, as a graduate student. At Miami, he went for 18 of 20 on field goal attempts and went for a perfect 35–35 on extra points. During his first game for Miami, he kicked a field goal from 25 yards out while playing UAB. He was named ACC Specialist of the week after he went for 4 of 4 on field goals in a win against the top 20 ranked Louisville Cardinals. One of his four field goals was 57 yards long, which tied the program record for Miami. During games against Florida State and Clemson he hit field goals from 30 and 42 yards out. In a game against Pittsburgh, he made a field goal from 37 yards out. The next week, against Virginia, he made both field goals from 32 and 20 yards. He drilled 3 field goals in a come-from-behind win against NC State and made 2 field goals which were from 40 and 42 yards in a win against Virginia. He hit field goals from 52 and 32 yards during a game against Duke. He also hit a 47-yard field goal in his lone attempt against North Carolina. He won the Lou Groza award, was a consensus First Team All-American, First Team All-Conference (ACC), and All-ACC Academic Team. Borregales was also invited to the 2021 Senior Bowl. On 23 December 2020, Borregales announced he will declare for the 2021 NFL draft and would still be able to play in his team's bowl game. On 1 May, after going undrafted in the 2021 NFL Draft, Borregales signed as a free agent with the Tampa Bay Buccaneers.

=== Statistics ===
College statistics
Year	School	XPM	XPA	FGM	FGA	FG%	Pts
2016	FIU						
2017	FIU	40	40	15	18	83.3	85
2018	FIU	54	55	14	19	73.7	96
2019	FIU	37	39	21	29	72.4	100
2020	Miami	37	37	20	22	91	97

== Professional career ==
Pre-draft measurables
Height	Weight	Arm length	Hand span
5 ft 10 in (1.78 m)	206 lb (93 kg)	29 5/8 in (0.75 m)	9 3/8 in (0.24 m)
All values from NFL Combine

=== Tampa Bay Buccaneers ===
Borregales signed with the Tampa Bay Buccaneers as an undrafted free agent on 13 May 2021. He was waived by the Buccaneers on 6 September, and was subsequently re-signed to the practice squad.

After the Buccaneers were eliminated in the Divisional Round of the 2021 playoffs, Borregales signed a reserve/future contract with Tampa Bay on 24 January 2022. He was waived by the Buccaneers as a part of final roster cuts on 30 August.

=== Orlando Guardians ===
On 18 November 2022, Borregales was drafted by the Orlando Guardians of the XFL. The Guardians folded when the XFL and USFL merged to create the United Football League (UFL).

=== Winnipeg Blue Bombers ===
On 22 January 2024, the Winnipeg Blue Bombers signed Borregales. He was released by the Blue Bombers on 14 May.

== Post-playing career ==
On 19 July 2026, Borregales joined the Miami Dolphins as a Nunn Wooten scouting fellow during training camp.

== Personal life ==
Borregales was born in Caracas, Venezuela, and immigrated to the United States with his family at the age of six. He is the third Venezuelan born player to make it to the NFL. His brother Andy is the kicker for the New England Patriots.
