= Khalil Herbert =

American football player (born 1998)

No. 25 – Atlanta Falcons
- Positions: Running back, return specialist
- Roster status: Active

Personal information
- Born: April 21, 1998 (age 28); Fort Lauderdale, Florida, U.S.
- Listed height: 5 ft 9 in (1.75 m)
- Listed weight: 212 lb (96 kg)

Career information
- High school: American Heritage (Plantation, Florida)
- College: Kansas (2016–2019); Virginia Tech (2020)
- NFL draft: 2021: 6th round, 217th overall pick

Career history
- Chicago Bears (2021–2024); Cincinnati Bengals (2024); Indianapolis Colts (2025)*; Seattle Seahawks (2025)*; New York Jets (2025); San Francisco 49ers (2026)*; Atlanta Falcons (2026–present)
- * Offseason or practice squad member only

Awards and highlights
- Second-team All-ACC (2020)

Career NFL statistics as of Week 10, 2026
- Rushing yards: 1,985
- Rushing average: 4.7
- Rushing touchdowns: 9
- Receptions: 60
- Receiving yards: 347
- Receiving touchdowns: 2
- Return yards: 1,361
- Stats at Pro Football Reference

Khalil Herbert (born April 21, 1998) is an American professional football running back and return specialist for the Atlanta Falcons of the National Football League (NFL). He played college football for the Kansas Jayhawks and Virginia Tech Hokies before being selected by the Chicago Bears in the sixth round of the 2021 NFL draft. He also played for the Cincinnati Bengals.

== Early life ==
Herbert attended American Heritage School in Plantation, Florida. He committed to the University of Kansas to play college football. He has roots in Jamaica and the British Virgin Islands.

== College career ==
=== Kansas ===
As a true freshman at Kansas in 2016, Herbert played in eight games with three starts and rushed for 189 yards on 44 carries with three touchdowns. As a sophomore he started six of 11 games, rushing for 663 yards on 120 carries and four touchdowns in the 2017 season. In the 2017 season, he ran for 291 yards and two touchdowns on 36 carries against West Virginia. He played in 12 games his junior year in 2018 and rushed 113 times for 499 yards and five touchdowns. Herbert played in four games in 2019 before leaving the team. He finished the year with 384 yards on 43 carries with two touchdowns.

=== Virginia Tech ===
Herbert joined Virginia Tech as a graduate transfer in 2020. He took over as the team's starting running back. In the Hokies' season opener against North Carolina State, he had 150 scrimmage yards and a rushing touchdown in the victory. Against Duke, he set the school record for all-purpose yards in a game with 358 (208 rushing and 150 kick returning) in the victory. In the following game against North Carolina, he had 18 carries for 138 yards and two touchdowns. In the following game against Boston College, he had 18 carries for 143 rushing yards and a 29-yard receiving touchdown in the victory. On October 31, in a road victory over Louisville, he had 21 carries for 147 yards and one touchdown. On December 12, against rival Virginia, he had 20 carries for 162 yards and a touchdown in the victory.

Herbert finished his one season with Virginia Tech with 155 carries for 1,183 rushing yards and eight rushing touchdowns to go along with ten receptions for 179 receiving yards and one receiving touchdown in 11 games. He averaged 26.9 yards per kickoff return to lead the ACC.

== Professional career ==
Pre-draft measurables
Height	Weight	Arm length	Hand span	Wingspan	40-yard dash	10-yard split	20-yard split	20-yard shuttle	Three-cone drill	Vertical jump	Broad jump	Bench press
5 ft 8 7/8 in (1.75 m)	210 lb (95 kg)	31 1/4 in (0.79 m)	8 1/2 in (0.22 m)	6 ft 1 7/8 in (1.88 m)	4.49 s	1.62 s	2.64 s	4.34 s	6.90 s	33.0 in (0.84 m)	9 ft 7 in (2.92 m)	22 reps
All values from Pro Day

=== Chicago Bears ===
==== 2021 ====
Herbert was selected by the Chicago Bears in the sixth round, 217th overall, of the 2021 NFL draft. He signed his four-year rookie contract with Chicago on June 2, 2021. Herbert started the season as the Bears kick returner and third-string running back. He earned more playtime after an injury to starting running back David Montgomery. Herbert capitalized on the opportunity by earning 75 yards on 18 carries in a Week 5 win over the Las Vegas Raiders. He was named the team's starting running back after Damien Williams was placed on the COVID-19 reserve list just days before the Bears Week 6 contest against the Green Bay Packers. Herbert rushed for 97 yards and one touchdown on 19 carries in a 24–14 loss to the Packers. Herbert finished his first season with 433 rushing yards on 103 carries and two touchdowns.

==== 2022 ====
Herbert entered the 2022 season as the Bears' second-string running back behind Montgomery. In a Week 3 game against the Houston Texans on September 25, 2022, Herbert rushed for 157 yards on 20 carries and two touchdowns after Bears starting running back Montgomery went down with an injury in the Bears 23–20 win. Herbert was named the FedEx Ground Player of the Week for his efforts against the Texans. He suffered a hip injury in Week 10 and was placed on injured reserve on November 15, 2022. He was activated on December 23. In the 2022 season, he appeared in 13 games and started one. He finished with 129 carries for 731 rushing yards and four rushing touchdowns to go along with nine receptions for 57 receiving yards and a receiving touchdown.

==== 2023 ====
Herbert entered the 2023 season as the Bears starting running back after David Montgomery signed with the Detroit Lions. In Week 4, he ran for 103 yards and had four catches for 19 yards and one touchdown. He suffered an ankle injury in Week 5 and was placed on injured reserve on October 13, 2023. He was activated on November 18.

==== 2024 ====
In Week 2 of the 2024 season, Herbert would get his first touchdown of the year in a loss to the Houston Texans.

=== Cincinnati Bengals ===
On November 5, 2024, Herbert was traded to the Cincinnati Bengals in exchange for a seventh round pick. Herbert made his debut for the Bengals in their November 17 Sunday Night Football game against the Los Angeles Chargers where he would return a single punt for 29 yards in a 27–34 loss. His main role with the Bengals was taking over as the team's kickoff returner from Jermaine Burton.

Bengals' starting running back Chase Brown suffered an ankle injury late in the Bengals' Week 17 win against the Denver Broncos, leading to Herbert's lone start with the Bengals coming in their Week 18 game against the Pittsburgh Steelers. He finished the game with 69 yards on 20 carries.

=== Indianapolis Colts ===
On March 14, 2025, Herbert signed with the Indianapolis Colts on a one-year contract. He was released on August 26 as part of final roster cuts and re-signed to the practice squad the next day. He was released on September 8.

=== Seattle Seahawks ===
On September 23, 2025, Herbert was signed to the Seattle Seahawks' practice squad.

=== New York Jets ===
On October 2, 2025, Herbert was signed by the New York Jets off the Seahawks practice squad.

=== San Francisco 49ers ===
On August 2, 2026, Herbert signed a one-year contract with the San Francisco 49ers. He was released by the team on August 17. Three days later, Herbert re-signed with San Francisco on a one–year contract. On August 30, he was released by the 49ers as a part of final roster cuts.

=== Atlanta Falcons ===
On September 16, 2026, Herbert signed with the Atlanta Falcons' practice squad. He was promoted to the active roster on November 7.

== Career statistics ==
=== NFL ===
Year	Team	Games		Rushing					Receiving					Kick returns					Fumbles	
Year	Team	GP	GS	Att	Yds	Avg	Lng	TD	Rec	Yds	Avg	Lng	TD	Ret	Yds	Avg	Lng	TD	Fum	Lost
2021	CHI	17	2	103	433	4.2	29	2	14	96	6.9	20	0	27	650	24.1	50	0	1	0
2022	CHI	13	1	129	731	5.7	63	4	9	57	6.3	25	1	5	146	29.2	50	0	0	0
2023	CHI	12	9	132	611	4.6	38	2	20	134	6.7	23	1	0	0	0	0	0	1	1
2024	CHI	6	0	8	16	2.0	6	1	2	4	2.0	2	0	1	28	28.0	28	0	0	0
2024	CIN	8	1	28	114	4.1	14	0	8	21	2.6	7	0	3	96	32.0	35	0	1	1
2025	NYJ	7	0	16	52	3.3	7	0	1	4	4.0	4	0	1	22	22.0	22	0	0	0
2026	ATL	4	0	7	28	4.0	9	0	6	31	5.2	19	0	15	419	27.9	39	0	0	0
Career		67	13	423	1,985	4.7	63	9	60	347	5.8	25	2	52	1,361	26.2	50	0	3	2

=== College ===
Season	Team	GP	Rushing				Receiving			
Season	Team	GP	Att	Yds	Avg	TD	Rec	Yds	Avg	TD
2016	Kansas	8	44	189	4.3	3	6	42	7.0	0
2017	Kansas	11	120	663	5.5	4	8	38	4.8	0
2018	Kansas	12	113	499	4.4	5	9	39	4.3	0
2019	Kansas	4	43	384	8.9	2	1	-1	-1.0	0
2020	Virginia Tech	11	154	1,182	7.7	8	10	179	17.9	1
Career		46	474	2,917	6.2	22	34	297	8.7	1
