= 2020 Miami Hurricanes football team =

American college football season

2020 Miami Hurricanes football

Cheez-It Bowl, L 34–37 vs. Oklahoma State
- Conference: Atlantic Coast Conference

Ranking
- Coaches: No. 22
- AP: No. 22
- Record: 8–3 (7–2 ACC)
- Head coach: Manny Diaz (2nd season)
- Offensive coordinator: Rhett Lashlee (1st season)
- Offensive scheme: Bear raid
- Defensive coordinator: Blake Baker (2nd season)
- Co-defensive coordinator: Ephraim Banda (2nd season)
- Base defense: Multiple
- Home stadium: Hard Rock Stadium

2020 Atlantic Coast Conference football standings
	Conf.			Overall
Team	W		L	W		L
No. 5 Notre Dame y^	9	–	0	10	–	2
No. 3 Clemson y$^	8	–	1	10	–	2
No. 22 Miami (FL)	7	–	2	8	–	3
No. 18 North Carolina	7	–	3	8	–	4
NC State	7	–	3	8	–	4
Boston College	5	–	5	6	–	5
Pittsburgh	5	–	5	6	–	5
Virginia Tech	5	–	5	5	–	6
Virginia	4	–	5	5	–	5
Wake Forest	3	–	4	4	–	5
Georgia Tech	3	–	6	3	–	7
Louisville	3	–	7	4	–	7
Florida State	2	–	6	3	–	6
Duke	1	–	9	2	–	9
Syracuse	1	–	9	1	–	10
Championship: Clemson 34, Notre Dame 10
^ – College Football Playoff participant; $ – Conference champion; y – Championship game participant; Rankings from AP Poll.

The 2020 Miami Hurricanes football team (variously "Miami", "The U", "UM", "'Canes") represented the University of Miami during the 2020 NCAA Division I FBS football season. The Hurricanes were led by second-year head coach Manny Diaz and played their home games at Hard Rock Stadium, competing as a member of the Atlantic Coast Conference (ACC).

== Offseason ==
=== Position key ===
Back	B	Center	C	Cornerback	CB	Defensive back	DB		
Defensive end	DE	Defensive lineman	DL	Defensive tackle	DT	End	E		
Fullback	FB	Place kicker	PK	Guard	G	Halfback	HB	Kicker	K
Kickoff returner	KR	Offensive tackle	OT	Offensive lineman	OL	Linebacker	LB		
Long snapper	LS	Split end	SE	Punter	P	Punt returner	PR	Quarterback	QB
Running back	RB	Safety	S	Tight end	TE	Wide receiver	WR		

=== Offseason departures ===
Four Miami players with remaining eligibility declared early for the 2020 NFL draft. In addition, 10 seniors from the 2019 team graduated.

2020 Miami offseason departures
Name	Number	Pos.	Height	Weight	Year	Hometown	Notes
DeeJay Dallas	13	RB	5'10	214	Junior	Deerfield Beach, GA	Declared for NFL Draft
Jeff Thomas	4	WR	5'10	174	Junior	East St Louis, ILL	Declared for NFL Draft
Jonathan Garvin	97	DE	6'4	250	Junior	Lake Worth, GA	Declared for NFL Draft
Trajan Brandy	2	CB	5'9	186	Junior	Miami, FL	Declared for NFL Draft
Jimmy Murphy	5	29	5'7	184	RS Senior	Avon, Conn	Graduated
K. J. Osborn	2	WR	6'0	206	Senior	Ypsilanti, MI	Graduated
Tommy Kennedy	72	OL	6'4	289	Senior	Lake Bluff, Ill	Graduated
Trevon Hill	94	DL	6–3	238	RS Senior	Virginia Beach, Virginia	Graduated
Pat Bethel	93	DL	6–3	276	Senior	Vero Beach, Florida	Graduated
Chigozie Nnoruka	99	DL	6–2	301	RS Senior	Sacramento, California	Graduated
Shaquille Quarterman	55	LB	6–1	241	Senior	Orange Park, Florida	Graduated
Michael Pinckney	56	LB	6–1	226	Senior	Jacksonville, Florida	Graduated
Romeo Finley	30	SK	6–1	213	Senior	Fort Walton Beach, Florida.	Graduated
Robert Knowles	20	Safety	6–1	196	RS Senior	Miami, Florida	Graduated

=== Recruiting ===
College recruiting
Name	Hometown	School	Height	Weight	Commit date
Avantae Williams; S	Deland, FL	Deland High School (FL)	5 ft 11 in (1.80 m)	170 lb (77 kg)	Feb 5, 2020
Avantae Williams; S	Recruit ratings: Rivals: 247Sports: ESPN:				
Chantz Williams; WDE	Orange Park, FL	Oakleaf High School (FL)	6 ft 4 in (1.93 m)	238 lb (108 kg)	Jul 20, 2019
Chantz Williams; WDE	Recruit ratings: Rivals: 247Sports: ESPN:				
Jaylan Knighton; RB	Deerfield Beach, FL	Deerfield Beach High School (FL)	5 ft 10 in (1.78 m)	190 lb (86 kg)	Nov 28, 2019
Jaylan Knighton; RB	Recruit ratings: Rivals: 247Sports: ESPN:				
Don Chaney Jr; RB	Miami, FL	Belen Jesuit High School (FL)	5 ft 10 in (1.78 m)	210 lb (95 kg)	Feb 3, 2019
Don Chaney Jr; RB	Recruit ratings: Rivals: 247Sports: ESPN:				
Jalen Rivers; OL	Jacksonville, FL	Oakleaf High School (FL)	6 ft 5 in (1.96 m)	325 lb (147 kg)	Jun 9, 2019
Jalen Rivers; OL	Recruit ratings: Rivals: 247Sports: ESPN:				
Micheal Redding III; WR	Pensacola, FL	IMG Academy (FL)	6 ft 1 in (1.85 m)	195 lb (88 kg)	Jun 30, 2019
Micheal Redding III; WR	Recruit ratings: Rivals: 247Sports: ESPN:				
Tyler Van Dyke; QB	Glastonbury, Conn	Suffield Academy (CONN)	6 ft 4 in (1.93 m)	220 lb (100 kg)	Apr 29, 2019
Tyler Van Dyke; QB	Recruit ratings: Rivals: 247Sports: ESPN:				
Jalen Harrell; S	Hollywood, FL	Champagnat Catholic High School (FL)	6 ft 4 in (1.93 m)	220 lb (100 kg)	Nov 29, 2019
Jalen Harrell; S	Recruit ratings: Rivals: 247Sports: ESPN:				
Elijah Roberts; EDGE	Miami, FL	Christopher Columbus High School (FL)	6 ft 4 in (1.93 m)	275 lb (125 kg)	Jun 21, 2019
Elijah Roberts; EDGE	Recruit ratings: Rivals: 247Sports: ESPN:				
Keshawn Washington; S	Homestead, FL	South Dade High School (FL)	6 ft 2 in (1.88 m)	190 lb (86 kg)	Jun 21, 2019
Keshawn Washington; S	Recruit ratings: Rivals: 247Sports: ESPN:				

=== Transfers ===
Outgoing

Name	No.	Pos.	Height	Weight	Year	Hometown	New school
Jarren Williams	#15	QB	6'2	216	RS Freshman	Lawrenceville, Georgia	Garden City
Lorenzo Lingard	#36	RB	6'0	203	RS Freshman	Birmingham, Alabama	Florida
Brian Polendy	#88	TE	6’5	260	RS Sophomore	Denton, Texas	Colorado
Scott Patchan	#71	EDGE	6’6	249	RS Senior	Bradenton, Florida	Colorado State
Bubba Baxa	#21	K	6'0	213	Sophomore	Pasadena, Texas	Houston

=== 2020 NFL draft ===
==== Team players drafted into the NFL ====
Round	Pick	Player	Position	NFL team
4	140	Shaquille Quarterman	LB	Jacksonville Jaguars
4	144	DeeJay Dallas	RB	Seattle Seahawks
5	176	K. J. Osborn	WR	Minnesota Vikings
7	242	Jonathan Garvin	DE	Green Bay Packers

== Season ==
=== ACC Media Days ===
Media poll (ACC Winner)
Predicted finish	Team	Votes (6th place)
1	Clemson	2008 (132)
2	Notre Dame	1824 (2)
3	University Of North Carolina	1682
4	Louisville	1434
5	Virginia Tech	1318
6	Miami	1280

=== Preseason ALL ACC Teams ===
Player	Position	Year
Brevin Jordan	TE	Jr

== Personnel ==
=== Coaching staff ===
Name	Position	Years at Miami
Manny Diaz	Head coach	5th
Rhett Lashlee	Offensive coordinator/quarterbacks coach	1st
Blake Baker	Defensive coordinator/inside linebackers coach	2nd
Todd Stroud	Assistant head coach/defensive line coach	2nd
Ephraim Banda	Co-defensive coordinator/safeties coach	5th
Jonathan Patke	Assistant coach, Outside linebackers coach, Special Teams Coach	3rd
Stephen Field	Assistant coach, Tight ends coach	2nd
Jonathan Brewer	Offensive quality control coach	1st
Eric Hickson	Assistant coach, Running backs coach	2nd
Garin Justice	Assistant coach, Offensive line coach	1st
Rob Likens	Assistant coach, Wide receivers	1st
Mike Rumph	Assistant coach, Cornerbacks	5th
Ed Reed	Chief Of Staff	1st

=== Roster ===
2020 Miami Hurricanes Football roster
Quarter Back: 1 D'Eriq King – (redshirt) Senior (5'11, 202); 5 N'Kosi Perry – (redshirt) Junior (6'4, 190); 16 Ryan Rizk – (redshirt) Sophomore (6'1, 195); 17 Payton Matocha – (redshirt) Freshman (6'4, 205); 19 Tyler Van Dyke – Freshman (6'3, 220); Tailback: 2 Donald Chaney Jr – Freshman (5'10, 210); 4 Jaylan Knighton – Freshman (5'10, 190); 22 Robert Burns – (redshirt) Junior (5'11, 225); 23 Cam'Ron Harris – Junior (5'10, 210); 10 Isaiah Cashwell – (redshirt) Sophomore (5'8, 214); Wide receiver: 3 Mike Harley Jr. – Senior (5'11, 180); 6 Mark Pope – Junior (6'1, 172); 8 Dee Wiggins – Junior (5'11, 202); 12 Jeremiah Payton – (redshirt) Freshman (6'1, 195); 27 Marshall Few – (redshirt) Junior (5'11, 190); 31 Connor Byrne - (redshirt) Junior (6'2, 195); 34 Elias Lugo-Fagundo - (redshirt) Junior (6'0, 198); 39 Dante Johnson Byrne - (redshirt) Junior (6'2, 208); 40 Will Huggins - (redshirt) Sophomore (6'2, 218); 47 Mykel Tubbs - (redshirt) Freshmen (6'3, 190); 82 Jarius Howard - (redshirt) Freshmen (5'10, 167); 83 Micheal Redding III - Freshmen (6'2, 202); 84 Dazalin Worsham - Freshmen (6'1, 175); 87 Mark Byrne - Senior (6'2, 190); 88 Keyshawn Smith - Freshmen (6'1, 182); Placekicker: 30 José Borregales - (redshirt) Senior (5'10, 205); 45 Camden Price - (redshirt) Sophomore (6'1, 175); 47 Turner Davidson - (redshirt) Junior (5'9, 160); Punter: 85 Sebastian Przytula - Freshmen (6'1, 185); 86 Fred Potter - Freshmen (5'11, 183); 87 Matias Gasc - (redshirt) Senior (6'1, 185); 94 Lou Hedley - (redshirt) Junior (6'4, 220)	Tight end: 9 Brevin Jordan - Junior (6'3, 245); 48 Robert Prosek - (redshirt) Freshmen (6'4, 235); 81 Larry Hodges - (redshirt) Freshmen (6'2, 230); 85 Will Mallory - Junior (6'5, 245); 94 Dominic Hedley - Freshmen (6'4, 235); Offensive line: 51 DJ Scaife Jr - Junior (6'3, 314); 52 Cleveland Reed Jr - (redshirt) Sophomore (6'3, 320); 53 Jakai Clark - Sophomore (6'3, 320); 54 Isaiah Walker Jr - Freshmen (6'4, 220); 55 Navaughn Donaldson - Senior (6'6, 350); 60 Zion Nelson - Sophomore (6'5, 312); 62 Jarrid Williams - (redshirt) Senior (6'6, 308); 64 Jalen Rivers - Freshmen (6'5, 325); 65 Corey Gaynor - (redshirt) Junior (6'4, 300); 66 Ousman Traore - (redshirt) Sophomore (6'3, 310); 67 Gavin Adams - Freshmen (6'2, 270); 68 Michael Scibelli - (redshirt) Sophomore (6'2, 305); 71 Jared Griifith - (redshirt) Sophomore (6'3, 320); 72 Chris Washington - Freshmen (6'7, 300); 74 John Campbell Jr - (redshirt) Sophomore (6'5, 310); 77 Adam Elgammal - (redshirt) Freshmen (6'4, 310); Defensive linemen: 1 Nesta Jade Silvera - Junior (6'2, 305); 2 Quincy Roche - (redshirt) Senior (6'3, 245); 12 Jahfari Harvey - (redshirt) Freshmen (6'4, 245); 15 Jaelan Phillips - (redshirt) Junior (6'5, 266); 22 Cameron Williams - (redshirt) Freshmen (6'4, 240); 45 Bryan Levine - (redshirt) Freshmen (6'3, 230); 69 Sam Fishman - Freshmen (6'3, 215); 81 Jared Harrison-Hunte - (redshirt) Freshmen (6'4, 285); 84 Josh Neely - (redshirt) Freshmen (6'3, 258); 90 Quentin Williams - Freshmen (6'3, 260); 91 Jordan Miller - (redshirt) Sophomore (6'4, 320); 92 Jason Blisset Jr - (redshirt) Freshmen (6'4, 262); 96 Jonathan Ford - Senior (6'5, 318); 98 Jalar Holley - (redshirt) Freshmen (6'2, 285); 99 Elijah Roberts - Freshmen (6'4, 275)	Linebacker: 6 Sam Brooks Jr - Sophomore (6'2, 220); 9 Avery Huff - (redshirt) Freshmen (6'3, 215); 11 Corey Flagg Jr - Freshmen (5'11, 228); 17 Waynmon Steed - (redshirt) Junior (6'0, 222); 18 Tirek Austin-Cave - Freshmen (6'1, 220); 34 Ryan Ragone - (redshirt) Sophomore (5'11, 215); 35 Zac Smith - (redshirt) Freshmen (6'2, 243); 37 Colvin Alford - (redshirt) Junior (6'0, 220); 38 Shane Sawyer - Freshmen (6'3, 245); 44 Bradley Jennings Jr - (redshirt) Junior (6'1, 225); 48 Jake Hoffman - (redshirt) Freshmen (6'1, 210); 52 Patrick Joyner Jr - (redshirt) Sophomore (6'2, 225); 53 Zach McCloud - (redshirt) Senior (6'2, 235); Defensive back: 5 Amari Carter - Senior (6'2, 200); 7 Al Blades Jr. - Junior (6'1, 192); 8 D. J. Ivey - Junior (6'1, 195); 20 Jalen Harrel - Freshmen (6'2, 200); 21 Bubba Bolden - (redshirt) Junior (6'3, 200); 23 Te'Cory Couch - Sophomore (5'10, 172); 25 Keshawn Washington - Freshmen (6'2, 190); 26 Gurvan Hall Jr - Junior (6'0, 194); 27 Brian Bolam - Freshmen (6'0, 190); 28 Marcus Clarke - Freshmen (5'10, 190); 29 Isaiah Dunson - Freshmen (6'1, 184); 31 Avantae Williams - Freshmen (6'0, 180); 36 Andrew Barnes - (redshirt) Freshmen (6'0, 195); 40 Luis Gutierrez Jr - (redshirt) Freshmen (5'9, 156); 46 Suleman Burrows - (redshirt) Sophomore (5'8, 163); Long snapper: 49 Mason Napper - (redshirt) Freshmen (6'2, 225); 58 Clay James - (redshirt) Sophomore (5'10, 196); 59 Alan Nadelsticher - (redshirt) Freshmen (6'0, 185)

=== Depth chart ===
Projected Depth Chart 2020:

Defense

FS
Amari Carter
Bubba Bolden
Brian Balom

WLB	ILB	ILB	SLB
⋅	⋅	⋅	⋅
⋅	⋅	⋅	⋅
⋅	⋅	⋅	⋅

SS
Gurvan Hall Jr
Bubba Bolden
Keshawn Washington

CB
D. J. Ivey
Isaiah Dunson
Marcus Clarke

DE	NT	DE
⋅	Jonathan Ford	⋅
⋅	Jared Harrison-Hunte	⋅
⋅	Jalar Holley	⋅

CB
Te'Cory Couch
Al Blades Jr.
⋅

Offense

WR
Mike Harley Jr.
Marshall Few
Xavier Restrepo

WR
Mark Pope
Jeremiah Payton
Dazalin Warhsham

LT	LG	C	RG	RT
John Campbell Jr	Jakai Clark	Corey Gaynor	DJ Scaife Jr	Jarrid Williams
Zion Nelson	Ousman Traore	Cleveland Reed Jr	Jalen Rivers	Chris Washington
⋅	⋅	⋅	⋅	⋅

TE
Brevin Jordan
Will Mallory
Larry Hodges

WR
Dee Wiggins
Micheal Redding III
Keyshawn Smith

QB
D'Eriq King
N'Kosi Perry
Tyler Van Dyke

Key reserves
Season-ending injury
Suspension

RB
Cam'Ron Harris
Donald Chaney Jr.
Jaylan Knighton

Special teams
PK José Borregales
P Lou Hedley
KR Jaylen Knighton
PR Gurvan Hall Jr
LS Clay James
H Lou Hedley

True Freshman
Double Position : *

=== Schedule ===
Miami will host four ACC conference opponents: Florida State, Pittsburgh, Virginia, and North Carolina to close out the ACC regular season. Miami will travel to five ACC conference opponents: Louisville, Clemson, NC State, Virginia Tech, and Duke. Miami is not scheduled to play ACC opponents Notre Dame, Boston College, Wake Forest, Georgia Tech, and Syracuse. The Hurricanes bye week originally came during Week 5 (On October 3). However, due to COVID-19 problems in the organization, they had bye weeks during Week 12 (on November 21) and Week 13 (on November 28). Also due to COVID-19 problems, their game between Wake Forest and Georgia Tech were canceled.

Miami had games scheduled against Michigan State, Temple, and Wagner, which were all canceled before the start of the 2020 season due to the COVID-19 pandemic. On July 29, the ACC announced every non conference game except one would be played in the 2020 season.

Date	Time	Opponent	Rank	Site	TV	Result	Attendance
September 10	8:00 p.m.	UAB*		Hard Rock Stadium; Miami Gardens, FL	ACCN	W 31–14	8,153
September 19	7:30 p.m.	at No. 18 Louisville	No. 17	Cardinal Stadium; Louisville, KY (rivalry, College GameDay)	ABC	W 47–34	12,120
September 26	7:30 p.m.	Florida State	No. 12	Hard Rock Stadium; Miami Gardens, FL (rivalry, College GameDay)	ABC	W 52–10	12,806
October 10	7:30 p.m.	at No. 1 Clemson	No. 7	Memorial Stadium; Clemson, SC (College GameDay)	ABC	L 17–42	18,885
October 17	12:00 p.m.	Pittsburgh	No. 13	Hard Rock Stadium; Miami Gardens, FL	ACCN	W 31–19	9,000
October 24	8:00 p.m.	Virginia	No. 11	Hard Rock Stadium; Miami Gardens, FL	ACCN	W 19–14	9,940
November 6	7:30 p.m.	at NC State	No. 11	Carter–Finley Stadium; Raleigh, NC	ESPN	W 44–41	4,032
November 14	12:00 p.m.	at Virginia Tech	No. 9	Lane Stadium; Blacksburg, VA (rivalry)	ESPN	W 25–24	1,000
December 5	8:00 p.m.	at Duke	No. 10	Wallace Wade Stadium; Durham, NC	ACCN	W 48–0	0
December 12	3:30 p.m.	No. 17 North Carolina	No. 10	Hard Rock Stadium; Miami Gardens, FL	ABC	L 26–62	12,092
December 29	5:30 p.m.	vs. No. 21 Oklahoma State*	No. 18	Camping World Stadium; Orlando, FL (Cheez-It Bowl)	ESPN	L 34–37	0
*Non-conference game; Rankings from AP Poll and CFP Rankings after November 24 released prior to game; All times are in Eastern time

The ACC released their schedule on July 29, with specific dates selected on August 6.

== Game summaries ==
=== UAB ===
Game One – UAB Blazers (1–0) at Miami Hurricanes (0–0)

Quarter	1	2	3	4	Total
Blazers	7	0	7	0	14
Hurricanes	7	7	17	0	31

at Hard Rock Stadium • Miami Gardens, Florida

- Date: Thursday, September 10, 2020
- Game time: 8:00 p.m. EDT
- Game weather: Clear • Temperature: 82 °F (28 °C) • Wind: ENE 5 mph
- TV announcers (ACC Network): Dave O'Brien (play-by-play), Tim Hasselbeck (analyst), Katie George (sideline)

Game information

First quarter

- (2:40) UAB – Austin Watkins 16-yard pass from Tyler Johnston III, Matthew Quinn kick (Drive: 2 plays, 17 yards, 0:44; UAB 7–0)
- (1:04) MIA – Cam'Ron Harris 66 yard run, José Borregales kick (Drive: 4 plays, 75 yards, 1:36; Tied 7–7)

Second quarter

- (10:04) MIA – D'Eriq King 12-yard run, José Borregales kick (Drive: 6 plays, 64 yards, 2:16; Miami 14–7)

Third quarter

- (10:15) MIA – José Borregales 25 yard field goal (Drive: 11 plays, 66 yards, 4:45; Miami 17–7)
- (6:19) UAB – Spencer Brown 6 yard run, Matthew Quinn kick (Drive: 9 plays, 75 yards, 3:56; Miami 17–14)
- (4:02) MIA – Cam'Ron Harris 4 yard run, José Borregales kick (Drive: 7 plays, 71 yards, 2:17; Miami 24–14)
- (0:00) MIA – Brevin Jordan 4 yard pass from D'Eriq King, José Borregales kick (Drive: 7 plays, 75 yards, 2:42; Miami 31–14)

Fourth quarter

No scoring plays

Statistics	UAB	MIA
First downs	14	25
Plays–yards	61–285	78–495
Rushes–yards	26–80	52–337
Passing yards	205	158
Passing: comp–att–int	19–35–0	18–27–0
Turnovers		
Time of possession	29:04	30:56

Team	Category	Player	Statistics
UAB	Passing	Tyler Johnston III	15/23, 150 yards, 1 TD
UAB	Rushing	Spencer Brown	16 carries, 74 yards, 1 TD
UAB	Receiving	Myron Mitchell	8 receptions, 117 yards
Miami	Passing	D'Eriq King	16/24, 144 yards, 1 TD
Miami	Rushing	Cam'Ron Harris	17 carries, 134 yards, 2 TD
Miami	Receiving	Brevin Jordan	3 receptions, 51 yards, 1 TD

=== Louisville ===
Game Two – #17 Miami Hurricanes (1–0) at #18 Louisville Cardinals (1–0)

Quarter	1	2	3	4	Total
Hurricanes	14	6	17	10	47
Cardinals	3	3	14	14	34

at Cardinal Stadium • Louisville, Kentucky

- Date: Saturday, September 19, 2020
- Game time: 7:30 p.m. EDT
- Game weather: Clear • Temperature: 66 °F (19 °C) • Wind: NE 7 mph
- TV announcers (ABC): Chris Fowler (play-by-play), Kirk Herbstreit (analyst), Allison Williams (sideline)

Game information

First quarter

- (9:02) LOU – James Turner 40-yard field goal (Drive: 9 plays, 58 yards, 3:22; Louisville 3–0)
- (7:11) MIA – Will Mallory 17 yard pass from D'Eriq King, José Borregales kick (Drive: 5 plays, 75 yards, 1:51; Miami 7–3)
- (1:41) MIA – Jaylan Knighton 3 yard run, José Borregales kick (Drive: 11 plays, 86 yards, 3:39; Miami 14–3)

Second quarter

- (11:06) LOU – James Turner 22 yard field goal (Drive: 12 plays, 71 yards, 5:35; Miami 14–6)
- (10:07) MIA – José Borregales 48 yard field goal (Drive: 6 plays, 34 yards, 0:59; Miami 17–6)
- (5:49) MIA – José Borregales 57 yard field goal (Drive: 7 plays, 21 yards, 2:08; Miami 20–6)

Third quarter

- (11:28) LOU – Javian Hawkins 19-yard run, James Turner kick (Drive: 7 plays, 75 yards, 3:32; Miami 20–13)
- (11:15) MIA – Cam'Ron 75 yard run, José Borregales kick (Drive: 1 plays, 75 yards, 0:13; Miami 27–13)
- (5:13) LOU – Tutu Atwell 6-yard pass from Malik Cunningham, James Turner kick (Drive: 11 plays, 74 yards, 6:02; Miami 27–20)
- (5:02) MIA – Jaylan Knighton 75 yard pass from D'Eriq King, José Borregales kick (Drive: 1 plays, 75 yards, 0:11; Miami 34–20)
- (0:40) MIA – José Borregales 22 yard field goal (Drive: 8 plays, 37 yards, 2:50; Miami 37–20)

Fourth quarter

- (10:58) MIA – José Borregales 40 yard field goal (Drive: 9 plays, 38 yards, 2:58; Miami 40–20)
- (7:04) LOU – Marshon Ford 4 yard pass from Malik Cunningham, James Turner kick (Drive: 8 plays, 75 yards, 3:54; Miami 40–27)
- (5:20) MIA – Brevin Jordan 47 yard pass from D'Eriq King, José Borregales kick (Drive: 3 plays, 45 yards, 1:14; Miami 47–27)
- (2:06) LOU – Tutu Atwell 19 yard pass from Malik Cunningham, James Turner kick (Drive: 8 plays, 87 yards, 3:14; Miami 47–34)

Statistics	MIA	LOU
First downs	19	29
Plays–yards	64–485	87–516
Rushes–yards	30–160	49–209
Passing yards	325	307
Passing: comp–att–int	18–30–0	26–36–1
Turnovers		
Time of possession	21:59	38:01

Team	Category	Player	Statistics
Miami	Passing	D'Eriq King	18/30, 325 yards, 3 TD
Miami	Rushing	Cam'Ron Harris	9 carries, 134 yards, TD
Miami	Receiving	Brevin Jordan	7 receptions, 120 yards, TD
Louisville	Passing	Malik Cunningham	26/36, 307 yards, 3 TD, INT
Louisville	Rushing	Javian Hawkins	27 carries, 164 yards, TD
Louisville	Receiving	Tutu Atwell	8 receptions, 114 yards, 2 TD

=== Florida State ===
Game Three – Florida State Seminoles (0–1) at #12 Miami Hurricanes (2–0)

Quarter	1	2	3	4	Total
Seminoles	3	0	7	0	10
Hurricanes	14	24	0	14	52

at Hard Rock Stadium • Miami Gardens, Florida

- Date: Saturday, September 26, 2020
- Game time: 7:45 p.m. EDT
- Game weather: Cloudy • Temperature: 79 °F (26 °C) • Wind: S 11 mph
- TV announcers (ABC): Chris Fowler (play-by-play), Kirk Herbstreit (analyst), Molly McGrath (sideline)

Game information

First quarter

- (9:53) MIA – Brevin Jordan 24-yard pass from D'Eriq King, José Borregales kick (Drive: 13 plays, 75 yards, 5:07; Miami 7–0)
- (5:12) FSU – Ryan Fitzgerald 26 yard field goal (Drive: 14 plays, 68 yards, 4:41; Miami 7–3)
- (0:19) MIA – Cam'Ron Harris 3 yard run, José Borregales kick (Drive: 15 plays, 79 yards, 4:53; Miami 14–3)

Second quarter

- (12:36) MIA – Cam'Ron Harris 12 yard run, José Borregales kick (Drive: 3 plays, 57 yards, 0:59; Miami 21–3)
- (10:17) MIA – Dee Wiggins 40 yard pass from D'Eriq King, José Borregales kick (Drive: 3 plays, 74 yards, 1:04; Miami 28–3)
- (3:37) MIA – Donald Chaney Jr. 2 yard run, José Borregales kick (Drive: 11 plays, 70 yards, 4:49; Miami 35–3)
- (0:01) MIA – José Borregales 30 yard field goal (Drive: 8 plays, 39 yards, 0:43; Miami 38–3)

Third quarter

- (10:57) FSU – Camren McDonald 12 yard pass from James Blackman, Ryan Fitzgerald kick (Drive: 12 plays, 79 yards, 4:03; Miami 38–10)

Fourth quarter

- (14:57) MIA – Donald Chaney Jr. 5 yard run, José Borregales kick (Drive: 12 plays, 80 yards, 5:39; Miami 45–10)
- (10:17) MIA – Michael Redding III 7 yard pass from N'Kosi Perry, Camden Price kick (Drive: 9 plays, 67 yards, 4:33; Miami 52–10)

Statistics	FSU	MIA
First downs	23	32
Plays–yards	74–330	86–517
Rushes–yards	36–151	64–200
Passing yards	179	317
Passing: comp–att–int	22–37–3	33–48–0
Turnovers		
Time of possession	28:05	31:55

Team	Category	Player	Statistics
Florida State	Passing	James Blackman	16/26, 120 yards, TD, INT
Florida State	Rushing	Lawrance Toafili	16 carries, 64 yards
Florida State	Receiving	Camren McDonald	6 receptions, 58 yards, TD
Miami	Passing	D'Eriq King	29/40, 267 yards, 2 TD
Miami	Rushing	D'Eriq King	8 carries, 65 yards
Miami	Receiving	Mark Pope	5 receptions, 60 yards

=== Clemson ===
Game Four – #7 Miami Hurricanes (3–0) at #1 Clemson Tigers (3–0)

Quarter	1	2	3	4	Total
Hurricanes	0	10	0	7	17
Tigers	7	14	14	7	42

at Memorial Stadium • Clemson, South Carolina

- Date: Saturday, October 10, 2020
- Game time: 7:45 p.m. EDT
- Game weather: Cloudy • Temperature: 69 °F (21 °C) • Wind: E 8 mph
- TV announcers (ABC): Chris Fowler (play-by-play), Kirk Herbstreit (analyst), Allison Williams (sideline)

Game information

First quarter

- (9:50) CLEM – Braden Galloway 24-yard pass from Trevor Lawrence, B. T. Potter kick (Drive: 10 plays, 75 yards, 5:10; Clemson 7–0)

Second quarter

- (14:54) CLEM – Travis Etienne 2-yard run, B.T. Potter kick (Drive: 16 plays, 99 yards, 7:27; Clemson 14–0)
- (3:53) MIA – José Borregales 42 yard field goal, (Drive: 7 plays, 55 yards, 3:07; Clemson 14–3)
- (1:14) CLEM – Braden Galloway 11 yard pass from Trevor Lawrence, B.T. Potter kick (Drive: 6 plays, 70 yards, 2:39; Clemson 21–3)
- (0:00) MIA – D. J. Ivey 48 yard blocked field goal return, José Borregales kick (Clemson 21–10)

Third quarter

- (7:56) CLEM – Travis Etienne 72 yard run, B.T. Potter kick (Drive: 1 plays, 72 yards, 0:12; Clemson 28–10)
- (2:31) CLEM – Trevor Lawrence 3 yard run, B.T. Potter kick (Drive: 6 plays, 60 yards, 2:32; Clemson 35–10)

Fourth quarter

- (8:31) MIA – D'Eriq King 7-yard run, José Borregales kick (Drive: 9 plays, 71 yards, 4:06; Clemson 35–17)
- (4:32) CLEM – Davis Allen 22 yard pass from Trevor Lawrence, B.T. Potter kick (Drive: 7 plays, 65 yards, 3:59; Clemson 42–17)

Statistics	MIA	CLEM
First downs	9	34
Plays–yards	55–210	91–550
Rushes–yards	89	258
Passing yards	121	292
Passing: comp–att–int	12–29–3	29–44–0
Turnovers		
Time of possession	21:25	38:23

Team	Category	Player	Statistics
Miami	Passing	D'Eriq King	12/28, 121 yards, 2 INT
Miami	Rushing	D'Eriq King	14 carries, 84 yards, TD
Miami	Receiving	Keyshawn Smith	1 reception, 42 yards
Clemson	Passing	Trevor Lawrence	29/41, 292 yards, 3 TD
Clemson	Rushing	Travis Etienne	17 carries, 149 yards, 2 TD
Clemson	Receiving	Braden Galloway	4 receptions, 74 yards, 2 TD

=== Pittsburgh ===
Game Five – Pittsburgh Panthers (3–2) at #13 Miami Hurricanes (3–1)

Quarter	1	2	3	4	Total
Panthers	0	6	13	0	19
Hurricanes	7	7	14	3	31

at Hard Rock Stadium • Miami Gardens, Florida

- Date: Saturday, October 17, 2020
- Game time: 12:00 p.m. EDT
- Game weather: Sunny • Temperature: 85 °F (29 °C) • Wind: ENE 11 mph
- TV announcers (ACC Network): Chris Cotter (play-by-play), Mark Herzlich (analyst), Alex Chappell (sideline)

Game information

First quarter

- (5:48) MIA – Cam'Ron Harris 35-yard pass from D'Eriq King, José Borregales kick (Drive: 3 plays, 45 yards, 0:55; Miami 7–0)

Second quarter

- (6:44) MIA – Will Mallory 6 yard pass from D'Eriq King, José Borregales kick (Drive: 11 plays, 45 yards, 3:35; Miami 14–0)
- (2:43) PITT – Alex Kessman 33 yard field goal (Drive: 9 plays, 60 yards, 4:01; Miami 14–3)
- (0:08) PITT – Alex Kessman 24 yard field goal (Drive: 4 plays, 6 yards, 2:02; Miami 14–6)

Third quarter

- (13:13) MIA – Mike Harley Jr. 38 yard pass from D'Eriq King, José Borregales kick (Drive: 6 plays, 75 yards, 1:47; Miami 21–6)
- (11:20) PITT – Alex Kessman 36 yard field goal (Drive: 6 plays, 58 yards, 1:53; Miami 21–9)
- (9:20) PITT – Daniel Moraga 1 yard pass from Joey Yellen, Alex Kessman kick (Drive: 1 plays, 1 yard, 0:05; Miami 21–16)
- (5:40) MIA – Will Mallory 45 yard pass from D'Eriq King, José Borregales kick (Drive: 2 plays, 38 yards, 0:41; Miami 28–16)
- (0:31) PITT – Alex Kessman 30 yard field goal (Drive: 10 plays, 74 yards, 5:09; Miami 28–19)

Fourth quarter

- (4:13) MIA – José Borregales 37 yard field goal (Drive: 14 plays, 65 yards, 7:11; Miami 31–19)

Statistics	PITT	MIA
First downs	19	21
Plays–yards	77–300	74–331
Rushes–yards	22	109
Passing yards	278	222
Passing: comp–att–int	23–47–0	16–31–2
Turnovers		
Time of possession	30:33	27:39

Team	Category	Player	Statistics
Pittsburgh	Passing	Joey Yellen	22/46, 277 yards, TD
Pittsburgh	Rushing	Todd Sibley Jr.	4 carries, 23 yards
Pittsburgh	Receiving	Jordan Addison	8 receptions, 147 yards
Miami	Passing	D'Eriq King	16/31, 222 yards, 4 TD, 2 INT
Miami	Rushing	D'Eriq King	11 carries, 32 yards
Miami	Receiving	Will Mallory	2 receptions, 51 yards, 2 TD

=== Virginia ===
Game Six – Virginia Cavaliers (1–3) at #11 Miami Hurricanes (4–1)

Quarter	1	2	3	4	Total
Cavaliers	7	0	0	7	14
Hurricanes	7	3	3	6	19

at Hard Rock Stadium • Miami Gardens, Florida

- Date: Saturday, October 24, 2020
- Game time: 8:00 p.m. EDT
- Game weather: Cloudy • Temperature: 78 °F (26 °C) • Wind: ESE 7 mph
- TV announcers (ACC Network): Dave O'Brien (play-by-play), Tim Hasselbeck (analyst), Katie George (sideline)

Game information

First quarter

- (14:32) MIA – Mike Harley Jr. 43-yard pass from D'Eriq King, José Borregales kick (Drive: 2 plays, 75 yards, 0:20; Miami 7–0)
- (10:06) UVA – Tony Poljan 2 yard pass from Brennan Armstrong, Brian Delaney kick (Drive: 11 plays, 64 yards, 4:26; Tied 7–7)

Second quarter

- (1:02) MIA – José Borregales 32 yard field goal (Drive: 10 plays, 65 yards, 2:07; Miami 10–7)

Third quarter

- (3:47) MIA – José Borregales 20 yard field goal (Drive: 16 plays, 88 yards, 6:10; Miami 13–7)

Fourth quarter

- (12:04) MIA – Donald Chaney Jr. 1 yard run, 2 point conversion failed (Drive: 12 plays, 80 yards, 4:05; Miami 19–7)
- (5:27) UVA – Ra'Shaun Henry 35 yard pass from Brennan Armstrong, Brian Delaney kick (Drive: 6 plays, 94 yards, 2:10; Miami 19–14)

Statistics	UVA	MIA
First downs	18	23
Plays–yards	68–366	81–444
Rushes–yards	35–185	48–122
Passing yards	181	322
Passing: comp–att–int	16–32–0	21–30–0
Turnovers		
Time of possession	28:32	31:28

Team	Category	Player	Statistics
Virginia	Passing	Brennan Armstrong	16/30, 181 yards, 2 TD
Virginia	Rushing	Brennan Armstrong	15 carries, 91 yards
Virginia	Receiving	Terrell Jana	3 receptions, 60 yards
Miami	Passing	D'Eriq King	21/30, 322 yards, TD
Miami	Rushing	Donald Chaney Jr.	10 carries, 43 yards, TD
Miami	Receiving	Mike Harley Jr.	10 receptions, 170 yards, TD

=== NC State ===
Game Seven – #11 Miami Hurricanes (5–1) at NC State Wolfpack (4–2)

Quarter	1	2	3	4	Total
Hurricanes	14	7	10	13	44
Wolfpack	14	10	14	3	41

at Carter-Finley Stadium • Raleigh, North Carolina

- Date: Friday, November 6, 2020
- Game time: 7:30 p.m. EDT
- Game weather: Cloudy • Temperature: 61 °F (16 °C) • Wind: 0 mph
- Game attendance: 4,032
- Referee: Marcus Woods
- TV announcers (ESPN): Jason Benetti (play-by-play), Andre Ware (analyst), Marty Smith (sideline)

Game information

First quarter

- (12:44) NCST – Thayer Thomas 31-yard pass from Bailey Hockman, Christopher Dunn kick (Drive: 6 plays, 89 yards, 2:16; NC State 7–0)
- (9:21) MIA – Will Mallory 3 yard pass from D'Eriq King, José Borregales kick (Drive: 9 plays, 75 yards, 3:23; Tied 7–7)
- (6:31) NCST – Devin Carter 11 yard pass from Bailey Hockman, Christopher Dunn kick (Drive: 8 plays, 75 yards, 2:50; NC State 14–7)
- (3:14) MIA – Dee Wiggins 39 yard pass from D'Eriq King, José Borregales kick (Drive: 10 plays, 86 yards, 3:17; Tied 14–14)

Second quarter

- (13:34) MIA – Mike Harley Jr. 20 yard pass from D'Eriq King, José Borregales kick (Drive: 7 plays, 65 yards, 2:01; Miami 21–14)
- (9:35) NCST – Christopher Dunn 42 yard field goal (Drive: 10 plays, 50 yards, 3:59; Miami 21–17)
- (2:49) NCST – Cary Angeline Dunn 9 yard pass from Bailey Hockman, Christopher Dunn kick (Drive: 7 plays, 80 yards, 3:44; NC State 24–21)

Third quarter

- (11:26) MIA – José Borregales 36 yard field goal (Drive: 9 plays, 59 yards, 3:34; Tied 24–24)
- (7:17) NCST – Zonovan Knight 1 yard run, Christopher Dunn kick (Drive: 9 plays, 75 yards, 4:09; NC State 31–24)
- (5:00) MIA – Mark Pope 17 yard pass from D'Eriq King, José Borregales kick (Drive: 6 plays, 85 yards, 2:17; Tied 31–31)
- (4:45) NCST – Zonovan Knight 100 yard kickoff return, Christopher Dunn kick (NC State 38–31)

Fourth quarter

- (14:55) NCST – Christopher Dunn 53 yard field goal (Drive: 8 plays, 37 yards, 2:30; NC State 41–31)
- (11:04) MIA – José Borregales 36 yard field goal (Drive: 11 plays, 54 yards, 3:51; NC State 41–34)
- (6:12) MIA – José Borregales 22 yard field goal (Drive: 8 plays, 60 yards, 3:19; NC State 41–37)
- (2:43) MIA – Mike Harley Jr. 54 yard pass from D'Eriq King (José Borregales kick) (Drive: 5 plays, 84 yards, 1:08; Miami 44–41)

Statistics	MIA	NCST
First downs	30	24
Plays–yards	86–620	65–410
Rushes–yards	41–189	34–131
Passing yards	431	279
Passing: comp–att–int	32–42–0	20–29–1
Turnovers		
Time of possession	33:00	27:00

Team	Category	Player	Statistics
Miami	Passing	D'Eriq King	31/41, 430 yards, 5 TD
Miami	Rushing	D'Eriq King	15 carries, 105 yards
Miami	Receiving	Mike Harley Jr.	8 receptions, 153 yards, 2 TD
NC State	Passing	Bailey Hockman	19/28, 279 yards, 2 TD, INT
NC State	Rushing	Ricky Person Jr.	12 carries, 79 yards
NC State	Receiving	Emeka Emezie	4 receptions, 95 yards

With the win, the Hurricanes became bowl eligible for the 8th straight season.

=== Virginia Tech ===
Game Eight – #9 Miami Hurricanes (6–1) at Virginia Tech Hokies (4–3)

Quarter	1	2	3	4	Total
Hurricanes	3	10	6	6	25
Hokies	7	7	10	0	24

at Lane Stadium • Blacksburg, Virginia

- Date: Saturday, November 14, 2020
- Game time: 12:00 p.m. EST
- Game weather: Sunny • Temperature: 56 °F (13 °C) • Wind: SSE 1 mph
- TV announcers (ESPN): Roy Philpott (play-by-play), Kelly Stouffer (analyst), Eric Wood (sideline)

Game information

First quarter

- (6:01) VT – Hendon Hooker 53-yard run, Brian Johnson kick (Drive: 3 plays, 87 yards, 1:03; Virginia Tech 7–0)
- (0:37) MIA – José Borregales 42 yard field goal (Drive: 13 plays, 50 yards, 5:24; Virginia Tech 7–3)

Second quarter

- (8:47) VT – Jalen Holston 8 yard run, Brian Johnson kick (Drive: 7 plays, 80 yards, 2:30; Virginia Tech 14–3)
- (5:11) MIA – D'Eriq King 10-yard run, José Borregales kick (Drive: 10 plays, 84 yards, 3:36; Virginia Tech 14–10)
- (0:04) MIA – José Borregales 40 yard field goal (Drive: 11 plays, 30 yards, 3:37; Virginia Tech 14–13)

Third quarter

- (9:29) VT – Jalen Holston 1 yard run, Brian Johnson kick (Drive: 11 plays, 74 yards, 3:49; Virginia Tech 21–13)
- (6:14) VT – Brian Johnson 38 yard field goal (Drive: 6 plays, 28 yards, 2:13; Virginia Tech 24–13)
- (1:27) MIA – Cam'Ron Harris 6 yard run, 2 point conversion failed (Drive: 13 plays, 75 yards, 4:47; Virginia Tech 24–19)

Fourth quarter

- (5:59) MIA – Mark Pope 36 yard pass from D'Eriq King, 2 point conversion failed (Drive: 10 plays, 82 yards, 3:39; Miami 25–24)

Statistics	MIA	VT
First downs	25	23
Plays–yards	85–386	72–361
Rushes–yards	48–131	41–160
Passing yards	255	201
Passing: comp–att–int	24–38–0	19–30–1
Turnovers		
Time of possession	32:40	27:24

Team	Category	Player	Statistics
Miami	Passing	D'Eriq King	24/38, 255 yards, TD
Miami	Rushing	Cam'Ron Harris	14 carries, 63 yards, TD
Miami	Receiving	Dee Wiggins	8 receptions, 106 yards
Virginia Tech	Passing	Hendon Hooker	19/29, 201 yards, INT
Virginia Tech	Rushing	Hendon Hooker	21 carries, 59 yards, TD
Virginia Tech	Receiving	Tré Turner	5 receptions, 86 yards

=== Duke ===
Game Nine – #10 Miami Hurricanes (7–1) at Duke Blue Devils (2–7)

Quarter	1	2	3	4	Total
Hurricanes	14	7	21	6	48
Blue Devils	0	0	0	0	0

at Wallace Wade Stadium • Durham, North Carolina

- Date: Saturday, December 5, 2020
- Game time: 8:00 p.m. EST
- Game weather: Clear • Temperature: 42 °F (6 °C) • Wind: NNW 2 mph
- TV announcers (ACC Network): Dave O'Brien (play-by-play), Tim Hasselbeck (analyst), Katie George (sideline)

Game information

First quarter

- (6:01) MIA – Brevin Jordan 24-yard pass from D'Eriq King, José Borregales kick (Drive: 12 plays, 88 yards, 3:39; Miami 7–0)
- (1:15) MIA – Cam'Ron Harris 34-yard run, José Borregales kick (Drive: 6 plays, 80 yards, 1:47; Miami 14–0)

Second quarter

- (9:07) MIA – D'Eriq King 11-yard run, José Borregales kick (Drive: 5 plays, 56 yards, 1:34; Miami 21–0)

Third quarter

- (8:15) MIA – Dee Wiggins 2-yard pass from D'Eriq King, José Borregales kick (Drive: 9 plays, 62 yards, 2:43; Miami 28–0)
- (4:48) MIA – Dee Wiggins 89-yard pass from D'Eriq King, José Borregales kick (Drive: 2 plays, 91 yards, 0:32; Miami 35–0)
- (2:03) MIA – Cam'Ron Harris 1-yard run, José Borregales kick (Drive: 7 plays, 27 yards, 2:35; Miami 42–0)

Fourth quarter

- (10:50) MIA – José Borregales 52-yard field goal (Drive: 5 plays, 48 yards, 2:29; Miami 45–0)
- (8:44) MIA – José Borregales 30-yard field goal (Drive: 5 plays, 16 yards, 2:04; Miami 48–0)

Statistics	MIA	DUKE
First downs	24	14
Plays–yards	71–524	64–177
Rushes–yards	42–220	33–56
Passing yards	304	121
Passing: comp–att–int	17–26–0	25–31–1
Turnovers		
Time of possession	27:38	32:32

Team	Category	Player	Statistics
Miami	Passing	D'Eriq King	16/24, 248 yards, 3 TD
Miami	Rushing	Cam'Ron Harris	15 carries, 96 yards, 2 TD
Miami	Receiving	Mike Harley Jr.	2 receptions, 105 yards, TD
Duke	Passing	Chase Brice	20/25, 94 yards
Duke	Rushing	Mataeo Durant	10 carries, 48 yards
Duke	Receiving	Jake Bobo	5 receptions, 36 yards

=== North Carolina ===
Game Ten – #17 North Carolina (7–3) at #10 Miami (8–1)

Quarter	1	2	3	4	Total
Tar Heels	21	13	7	21	62
Hurricanes	3	7	8	8	26

at Hard Rock Stadium • Miami Gardens, Florida

- Date: Saturday, December 12, 2020
- Game time: 3:30 p.m. EST
- Game weather: Mostly Cloudy • Temperature: 77 °F (25 °C) • Wind: SE 5 mph
- TV announcers (ABC): Chris Fowler (play-by-play), Kirk Herbstreit (analyst), Maria Taylor (sideline)

Game information

First quarter

- (11:46) MIA – José Borregales 47-yard field goal (Drive: 10 plays, 50 yards, 3:14; Miami 3–0)
- (8:53) UNC – Javonte Williams 2-yard run, Grayson Atkins kick (Drive: 6 plays, 75 yards, 2:53; North Carolina 7–3)
- (2:33) UNC – Javonte Williams 1-yard run, Grayson Atkins kick (Drive: 11 plays, 71 yards, 4:59; North Carolina 14–3)
- (0:15) UNC – Michael Carter 65-yard run, Grayson Atkins kick (Drive: 1 plays, 65 yards, 0:11; North Carolina 21–3)

Second quarter

- (10:48) UNC – Grayson Atkins 21-yard field goal (Drive: 6 plays, 76 yards, 2:58; North Carolina 24–3)
- (7:09) UNC – Michael Carter 25-yard run, Grayson Atkins kick (Drive: 3 plays, 67 yards, 1:34; North Carolina 31–3)
- (3:05) UNC – Grayson Atkins 25-yard field goal (Drive: 5 plays, 84 yards, 1:49; North Carolina 34–3)
- (0:10) MIA – Mike Harley Jr. 2-yard pass from D'Eriq King, José Borregales (Drive: 12 plays, 75 yards, 2:55; North Carolina 34–10)

Third quarter

- (7:24) UNC – Sam Howell 2-yard run, Grayson Atkins kick (Drive: 13 plays, 75 yards, 7:36; North Carolina 41–10)
- (6:49) MIA – Brevin Jordan 76-yard pass from D'Eriq King, D'Eriq King–Dee Wiggins 2-point pass (Drive: 2 plays, 75 yards, 0:35; North Carolina 41–18)

Fourth quarter

- (14:16) UNC – Rontavius Groves 1-yard pass from Sam Howell, Grayson Atkins kick (Drive: 8 plays, 76 yards, 4:20; North Carolina 48–18)
- (12:42) MIA – Cam'Ron Harris 6-yard run, D'Eriq King–Will Mallory 2-point pass (Drive: 6 plays, 68 yards, 1:34; North Carolina 48–26)
- (11:00) UNC – Kamari Morales 5-yard pass from Sam Howell, Grayson Atkins kick (Drive: 4 plays, 46 yards, 1:42; North Carolina 55–26)
- (11:00) UNC – Javontae Williams 1-yard run, Grayson Atkins kick (Drive: 10 plays, 75 yards, 6:39; North Carolina 62–26)

Statistics	UNC	MIA
First downs	30	15
Plays–yards	78–778	60–314
Rushes–yards	55–554	27–75
Passing yards	224	239
Passing: comp–att–int	15–20–0	18–32–1
Turnovers		
Time of possession	40:17	19:41

Team	Category	Player	Statistics
Tar Heels	Passing	Sam Howell	14/19, 223 yards, TD
Tar Heels	Rushing	Michael Carter	24 carries, 308 yards, 2 TD
Tar Heels	Receiving	Dyami Brown	4 receptions, 167 yards
Miami	Passing	D'Eriq King	18/30, 239 yards, 2 TD, INT
Miami	Rushing	Cam'Ron Harris	11 carries, 53 yards
Miami	Receiving	Brevin Jordan	6 receptions, 140 yards, TD

=== Oklahoma State (2020 Cheez-It Bowl) ===
2020 Cheez-It Bowl

Quarter	1	2	3	4	Total
No. 21 Oklahoma State	21	0	3	13	37
No. 18 Miami	0	10	9	15	34

at Camping World Stadium • Orlando, Florida

- Date: Tuesday, December 29, 2020
- Game time: 5:30 p.m. EST
- Game weather: Sunny • Temperature: 70 °F (21 °C) • Wind: ENE 12 mph
- Referee: Steve Marlowe (SEC)
- TV announcers (ESPN/ESPN Radio): Dave O'Brien, Tim Hasselbeck, and Katie George/Sean Kelley and Barrett Jones

Game information

First quarter

- (11:39) OKST – Brennan Presley 30-yard pass from Spencer Sanders, Brady Pohl kick (Drive: 10 plays, 75 yards, 3:21; Oklahoma State 7–0)
- (5:25) OKST – L. D. Brown 2-yard run, Brady Pohl kick (Drive: 8 plays, 82 yards, 3:49; Oklahoma State 14–0)
- (0:56) OKST – Brennan Presley 32-yard pass from Spencer Sanders, Brady Pohl kick (Drive: 6 plays, 49 yards, 2:17; Oklahoma State 21–0)

Second quarter

- (14:14) MIA – Brevin Jordan 10-yard pass from D'Eriq King, José Borregales kick (Drive: 5 plays, 68 yards, 1:42; Oklahoma State 21–7)
- (3:55) MIA – José Borregales 22-yard field goal (Drive: 14 plays, 75 yards, 4:46; Oklahoma State 21–10)

Third quarter

- (13:25) MIA – José Borregales 40-yard field goal (Drive: 8 plays, 41 yards, 1:35; Oklahoma State 21–13)
- (8:45) MIA – Cam'Ron Harris 42-yard run, two-point conversion failed (Drive: 8 plays, 80 yards, 2:56; Oklahoma State 21–19)
- (2:57) OKST – Brady Pohl 26-yard field goal (Drive: 17 plays, 71 yards, 5:48; Oklahoma State 24–19)

Fourth quarter

- (14:19) OKST – Dillon Stoner 5-yard pass from Spencer Sanders, Brady Pohl kick (Drive: 7 plays, 45 yards, 2:45; Oklahoma State 31–19)
- (12:03) MIA – Brevin Jordan 1-yard pass from N'Kosi Perry, José Borregales kick (Drive: 7 plays, 80 yards, 2:16; Oklahoma State 31–26)
- (9:55) OKST – Brennan Presley 16-yard pass from Spencer Sanders, kick failed (Drive: 7 plays, 75 yards, 2:08; Oklahoma State 37–26)
- (5:39) MIA – Mike Harley Jr. 5-yard pass from N'Kosi Perry, Marshall few run (Drive: 10 plays, 75 yards, 4:16; Oklahoma State 37–34)

Statistics	OKST	MIA
First downs	29	28
Plays–yards	82–423	78–512
Rushes–yards	43–118	30–156
Passing yards	305	356
Passing: comp–att–int	27–40–0	30–48–0
Turnovers		
Time of possession	33:05	26:11

Team	Category	Player	Statistics
Oklahoma State	Passing	Spencer Sanders	27/40, 305 yards, 4 TD
Oklahoma State	Rushing	Spencer Sanders	13 carries, 45 yards
Oklahoma State	Receiving	Brennan Presley	6 receptions 118 yards, 3 TD
Miami	Passing	N'Kosi Perry	19/34, 228 yards, 2 TD
Miami	Rushing	Cam'Ron Harris	6 carries, 52 yards, TD
Miami	Receiving	Brevin Jordan	8 receptions, 96 yards, 2 TD

== Rankings ==
Ranking movements Legend: ██ Increase in ranking ██ Decrease in ranking RV = Received votes т = Tied with team above or below
	Week																
Poll	Pre	1	2	3	4	5	6	7	8	9	10	11	12	13	14	15	Final
AP	RV	RV*	17	12	8	7	13	11	12	11	9	12	10	9	19	18	22
Coaches	RV	RV*	18	14	8	7	12	11T	12	10	9	9	9	9	19	18	22
CFP	Not released												10	10	18	18	Not released

== Players drafted into the NFL ==
Round	Pick	Player	Position	NFL club
1	18	Jaelan Phillips	DE	Miami Dolphins
1	30	Gregory Rousseau	DE	Buffalo Bills
5	148	Brevin Jordan	TE	Houston Texans
6	216	Quincy Roche	OLB	Pittsburgh Steelers
