= Jared Harrison-Hunte =

American football player (born 2000)

No. 98 – Arizona Cardinals
- Position: Defensive end
- Roster status: Active

Personal information
- Born: July 22, 2000 (age 26); Middle Village, New York, U.S.
- Listed height: 6 ft 4 in (1.93 m)
- Listed weight: 294 lb (133 kg)

Career information
- High school: Christ the King Regional (Queens, New York)
- College: Miami (2019–2023); SMU (2024)
- NFL draft: 2025: undrafted

Career history
- Carolina Panthers (2025); Arizona Cardinals (2026–present)

Awards and highlights
- First-team All-ACC (2024)

Career NFL statistics as of Week 7, 2026
- Total tackles: 1
- Stats at Pro Football Reference

Jared Harrison-Hunte (born July 22, 2000) is an American professional football defensive end for the Arizona Cardinals of the National Football League (NFL). He played college football for the Miami Hurricanes and SMU Mustangs.

== Early life ==
Harrison-Hunte attended Christ the King Regional High School in Queens, New York, where he helped lead his basketball team to a state championship in addition to playing football. He was rated as a three-star recruit and committed to play college football for the Miami Hurricanes.

== College career ==
=== Miami ===
As a freshman in 2019, Harrison-Hunte took a redshirt. In 2020, he notched 17 tackles with six going for a loss, three sacks, and a forced fumble. In 2021, Harrison-Hunte played in 11 games with eight starts, posting 18 tackles with six and a half for a loss. In 2022, he tallied 16 tackles with four being for a loss, and two sacks. In 2023, Harrison-Hunte made 11 starts for Miami, where he recorded 26 tackles with three being for a loss, and two sacks. After the season, he entered his name into the NCAA transfer portal.

=== SMU ===
Harrison-Hunte transferred to play for the SMU Mustangs. In 2024, he notched 42 tackles with eight and a half being for a loss, six and a half sacks, and an interception for the Mustangs, earning first-team all-ACC honors.

== Professional career ==
Harrison-Hunte declared for the 2025 NFL draft, while also accepting an invite to participate in the 2025 East–West Shrine Bowl with his teammate Elijah Roberts.

Pre-draft measurables
Height	Weight	Arm length	Hand span	Wingspan	40-yard dash	10-yard split	20-yard split	20-yard shuttle	Three-cone drill	Vertical jump	Broad jump
6 ft 3 3/8 in (1.91 m)	290 lb (132 kg)	33 in (0.84 m)	9 1/8 in (0.23 m)	6 ft 7 1/2 in (2.02 m)	4.86 s	1.69 s	2.82 s	4.65 s	7.76 s	32.0 in (0.81 m)	9 ft 3 in (2.82 m)
All values from NFL Combine/Pro Day

=== Carolina Panthers ===
Harrison-Hunte signed with the Carolina Panthers as an undrafted free agent on April 27, 2025. He was waived on August 26, and re-signed to the practice squad. Harrison-Hunte was promoted to the active roster on November 8.

On August 30, 2026, Harrison-Hunte was waived by the Panthers as a part of final roster cuts.

=== Arizona Cardinals ===
On September 1, 2026, Harrison-Hunte was signed to the Arizona Cardinals' practice squad. On November 17, he was signed to the active roster.
