= 2020 Duke's Mayo Bowl =

Postseason college football bowl game

- 19th Duke's Mayo Bowl
| Wake Forest Demon Deacons | Wisconsin Badgers |
| (4–4) | (3–3) |
| ACC | Big Ten |
| 28 | 42 |
| Head coach: Dave Clawson | Head coach: Paul Chryst |
| | 1 | 2 | 3 | 4 | Total |
|---|---|---|---|---|---|
| Wake Forest | 14 | 0 | 7 | 7 | 28 |
| Wisconsin | 0 | 14 | 14 | 14 | 42 |
- Date: December 30, 2020
- Season: 2020
- Stadium: Bank of America Stadium
- Location: Charlotte, North Carolina
- MVP: Jack Sanborn (LB, Wisconsin)
- Favorite: Wisconsin by 10
- Referee: James Carter (SEC)
- Attendance: 1,500

United States TV coverage
- Network: ESPN
- Announcers: Taylor Zarzour (play-by-play), Matt Stinchcomb (analyst) and Marty Smith (sideline)

International TV coverage
- Network: ESPN Deportes

The 2020 Duke's Mayo Bowl was a college football bowl game played on December 30, 2020, with kickoff at noon EST on ESPN. It was the 19th edition of the Duke's Mayo Bowl (formerly the Belk Bowl), and was one of the 2020–21 bowl games concluding the 2020 FBS football season. Duke's Mayonnaise was the title sponsor of the game.

== Teams ==
Based on conference tie-ins, the Duke's Mayo Bowl was expected to feature teams from the Atlantic Coast Conference (ACC) and the Big Ten Conference. On December 20, teams from those conferences were announced as the game participants; Wake Forest of the ACC and Wisconsin of the Big Ten. This was the first meeting between the two programs.

=== Wake Forest Demon Deacons ===
Wake Forest entered the bowl with a 4–4 record (3–4 in conference play). The Demon Deacons played two ranked teams during the season, losing to Clemson and defeating Virginia Tech. Wake Forest had played in two prior editions of this bowl, winning the 2007 Meineke Car Care Bowl and 2017 Belk Bowl, when it was known by those names.

=== Wisconsin Badgers ===
Wisconsin entered the bowl with a 3–3 record, all in conference games. The Badgers played three ranked teams during the season, losing to each of Northwestern, Indiana, and Iowa. This was the first appearance by Wisconsin in this bowl.

== Game summary ==
2020 Duke's Mayo Bowl

| Quarter | 1 | 2 | 3 | 4 | Total |
|---|---|---|---|---|---|
| Wake Forest | 14 | 0 | 7 | 7 | 28 |
| Wisconsin | 0 | 14 | 14 | 14 | 42 |

at Bank of America Stadium • Charlotte, North Carolina

- Date: Wednesday, December 30, 2020
- Game time: 12:00 p.m. EST
- Game weather: Cloudy • Temperature: 41 °F (5 °C) • Wind: NNE 5 mph
- Referee: James Carter (SEC)
- TV announcers (ESPN): Taylor Zarzour (play-by-play), Matt Stinchcomb (analyst) and Marty Smith (sideline)
- ESPN game summary

Game information

First quarter

- (11:21) WF – Jaquarii Roberson 4 yard pass from Sam Hartman, Jack Crane kick (Drive: 9 plays, 65 yards, 3:39; Wake Forest 7–0)
- (7:21) WF – Jaquarii Roberson 18 yard pass from Sam Hartman, Jack Crane kick (Drive: 6 plays, 71 yards, 1:59; Wake Forest 14–0)

Second quarter

- (13:28) WIS – John Chenal 2 yard rush, Collin Larsh kick (Drive: 11 plays, 75 yards, 6:28; Wake Forest 14–7)
- (3:21) WIS – Graham Mertz 1 yard rush, Collin Larsh kick (Drive: 5 plays, 9 yards, 2:13; Tied 14–14)

Third quarter

- (11:11) WF – Jaquarii Roberson 8 yard pass from Sam Hartman, Jack Crane kick (Drive: 5 plays, 50 yards, 1:51; Wake Forest 21–14)
- (8:45) WIS – Graham Mertz 1 yard rush, Collin Larsh kick (Drive: 5 plays, 33 yards, 2:15; Tied 21–21)
- (1:20) WIS – Mason Stokke 14 yard pass from Graham Mertz, Collin Larsh kick (Drive: 2 plays, 32 yards, 0:44; Wisconsin 28–21)

Fourth quarter

- (13:49) WIS – Garrett Groshek 1 yard rush, Collin Larsh kick (Drive: 2 plays, 2 yards, 0:40; Wisconsin 35–21)
- (9:24) WIS – Jalen Berger 1 yard rush, Collin Larsh kick (Drive: 1 play, 3 yards, 0:09; Wisconsin 42–21)
- (0:06) WF – Christian Beal-Smith 1 yard rush, Jack Crane kick (Drive: 12 plays, 59 yards, 2:08; Wisconsin 42–28)

=== Statistics ===
| Statistics | WF | WIS |
|---|---|---|
| First downs | 27 | 19 |
| Plays–yards | 87–518 | 64–266 |
| Rushes–yards | 35–111 | 44–122 |
| Passing yards | 407 | 144 |
| Passing: comp–att–int | 24–52–4 | 13–20–1 |
| Time of possession | 26:08 | 33:52 |

| Team | Category | Player | Statistics |
|---|---|---|---|
| Wake Forest | Passing | Sam Hartman | 20/37, 318 yards, 3 TD, 4 INT |
| Wake Forest | Rushing | Christian Beal-Smith | 21 carries, 82 yards, 1 TD |
| Wake Forest | Receiving | Jaquarii Roberson | 8 receptions, 131 yards, 3 TD |
| Wisconsin | Passing | Graham Mertz | 11/17, 130 yards, 1 TD |
| Wisconsin | Rushing | Garrett Groshek | 13 carries, 41 yards, 1 TD |
| Wisconsin | Receiving | Jack Dunn | 6 receptions, 60 yards |

== Aftermath ==
During their post-game locker room celebration, Wisconsin quarterback Graham Mertz accidentally dropped and shattered the game trophy.
