= 2020 ACC Championship Game =

- Conference Championship
Clemson Tigers	Notre Dame Fighting Irish
(9–1)	(10–0)
34	10
Head coach: Dabo Swinney	Head coach: Brian Kelly
AP / Coaches / CFP; 4 / 3 / 3	AP / Coaches / CFP; 2 / 2 / 2
	1	2	3	4	Total
Clemson	7	17	7	3	34
Notre Dame	3	0	0	7	10
- Date: December 19, 2020
- Season: 2020
- Stadium: Bank of America Stadium
- Location: Charlotte, North Carolina
- MVP: Trevor Lawrence, (QB, Clemson)
- Favorite: Clemson by 11
- Referee: Jeff Heaser
- Attendance: 5,240

United States TV coverage
- Network: ABC
- Announcers: Chris Fowler (play-by-play), Kirk Herbstreit (color), Maria Taylor (sideline)

2020 Atlantic Coast Conference football standings
	Conf.			Overall
Team	W		L	W		L
No. 5 Notre Dame y^	9	–	0	10	–	2
No. 3 Clemson y$^	8	–	1	10	–	2
No. 22 Miami (FL)	7	–	2	8	–	3
No. 18 North Carolina	7	–	3	8	–	4
NC State	7	–	3	8	–	4
Boston College	5	–	5	6	–	5
Pittsburgh	5	–	5	6	–	5
Virginia Tech	5	–	5	5	–	6
Virginia	4	–	5	5	–	5
Wake Forest	3	–	4	4	–	5
Georgia Tech	3	–	6	3	–	7
Louisville	3	–	7	4	–	7
Florida State	2	–	6	3	–	6
Duke	1	–	9	2	–	9
Syracuse	1	–	9	1	–	10
Championship: Clemson 34, Notre Dame 10
^ – College Football Playoff participant; $ – Conference champion; y – Championship game participant; Rankings from AP Poll.

The 2020 ACC Championship Game was a college football game played on Saturday, December 19, 2020, at Bank of America Stadium in Charlotte. This was the 16th ACC Championship Game and determined the 2020 champion of the Atlantic Coast Conference. This season, the ACC used a one division format. Instead of representatives from two divisions, the two teams with the best conference records earned a spot in the game. Sponsored by restaurant chain Subway, the game was known as the ACC Championship Game presented by Subway. The game featured the Clemson Tigers and the Notre Dame Fighting Irish.

The game was originally scheduled for December 5. However, the COVID-19 pandemic pushed the game back to either December 12 or 19 when the revised ACC schedule was released and subsequently to December 19. Attendance for the game was capped at 5,240, or 7% of the capacity of Bank of America Stadium due to Governor Roy Cooper's order limiting outdoor stadiums to 7% capacity.

== Previous season ==
The 2019 ACC Championship Game featured Clemson against Virginia. It was Virginia's first appearance in the conference title game. In the championship game, Clemson was victorious by a score of 62–17, winning its fifth consecutive ACC conference championship and 19th overall. Virginia went on to play in the 2019 Orange Bowl, while Clemson went on to play in the 2020 College Football Playoff National Championship.

== Teams ==
=== Clemson ===
Clemson entered the championship game with a record of 9–1 (8–1 in conference play). Their only defeat of the season was to Notre Dame on November 7, a double-overtime loss in a game played without starting Tigers quarterback Trevor Lawrence. Clemson had a record of 6–1 in prior ACC Championship Games, having won each of the prior five games (2015–2019) and having only lost in 2009.

=== Notre Dame ===
Notre Dame entered the championship game with a record of 10–0 (9–0 in conference play). Their narrowest margin of victory, outside of the double-overtime contest with Clemson, was a 12–7 win over Louisville in mid-October. Notre Dame historically competes in football as an independent, but played the 2020 season as a member of the ACC following a delayed start to the season and factors related to the COVID-19 pandemic. As such, this was Notre Dame's first appearance in an ACC Championship Game.

== Game summary ==
2020 ACC Championship Game

Quarter	1	2	3	4	Total
No. 3 Clemson	7	17	7	3	34
No. 2 Notre Dame	3	0	0	7	10

at Bank of America Stadium • Charlotte, North Carolina

- Date: Saturday, December 19, 2020
- Game time: 4:00 p.m. EST
- Game weather: Clear • Temperature: 49 °F (9 °C) • Wind: SE 4 mph
- Referee: Jeff Heaser
- TV announcers (ABC): Chris Fowler (play-by-play), Kirk Herbstreit (color), Maria Taylor (sideline)

Game information

First quarter

- (8:16) ND – Jonathan Doerer 51 yard field goal (Drive: 11 plays, 46 yards, 6:44; Notre Dame 3–0)
- (0:41) CLEM – Amari Rodgers 67 yard pass from Trevor Lawrence, B. T. Potter kick (Drive: 3 plays, 80 yards, 1:01; Clemson 7–3)

Second quarter

- (9:24) CLEM – E.J. Williams 33 yard pass from Trevor Lawrence, B.T. Potter kick (Drive: 6 plays, 72 yards, 2:44; Clemson 14–3)
- (4:28) CLEM – B.T. Potter 27 yard field goal (Drive: 8 plays, 63 yards, 2:37; Clemson 17–3)
- (0:21) CLEM – Travis Etienne 44 yard rush, B.T. Potter kick (Drive: 10 plays, 88 yards, 1:49; Clemson 24–3)

Third quarter

- (3:43) CLEM – Trevor Lawrence 34 yard rush, B.T. Potter kick (Drive: 8 plays, 83 yards, 2:35; Clemson 31–3)

Fourth quarter

- (10:31)CLEM – B.T. Potter 37 yard field goal (Drive: 12 plays, 66 yards, 6:22; Clemson 34–3)
- (8:09) ND – Chris Tyree 21 yard rush, Doerer kick (Drive: 7 plays, 75 yards, 2:22; Clemson 34–10)

=== Statistics ===
Statistics	CLEM	ND
First downs	23	18
Plays–yards	66–541	58–263
Rushes–yards	27–219	30–44
Passing yards	322	219
Passing: comp–att–int	25–39–1	20–28–0
Turnovers		
Time of possession	28:08	31:52

Team	Category	Player	Statistics
Clemson	Passing	Trevor Lawrence	25/36, 322 yards, 2 TD, 1 INT
Clemson	Rushing	Travis Etienne	10 carries, 124 yards, 1 TD
Clemson	Receiving	Amari Rodgers	8 receptions, 121 yards, 1 TD
Notre Dame	Passing	Ian Book	20/28, 219 yards
Notre Dame	Rushing	Kyren Williams	15 carries, 50 yards
Notre Dame	Receiving	Ben Skowronek	4 receptions, 54 yards

== See also ==
- List of Atlantic Coast Conference football champions
