= 2020 Wake Forest Demon Deacons football team =

American college football season

2020 Wake Forest Demon Deacons football

Duke's Mayo Bowl, L 28–42 vs. Wisconsin
- Conference: Atlantic Coast Conference
- Record: 4–5 (3–4 ACC)
- Head coach: Dave Clawson (7th season)
- Offensive coordinator: Warren Ruggiero (7th season)
- Offensive scheme: Slow mesh
- Defensive coordinator: Lyle Hemphill (2nd season)
- Base defense: 4–3
- Home stadium: Truist Field at Wake Forest

2020 Atlantic Coast Conference football standings
	Conf.			Overall
Team	W		L	W		L
No. 5 Notre Dame y^	9	–	0	10	–	2
No. 3 Clemson y$^	8	–	1	10	–	2
No. 22 Miami (FL)	7	–	2	8	–	3
No. 18 North Carolina	7	–	3	8	–	4
NC State	7	–	3	8	–	4
Boston College	5	–	5	6	–	5
Pittsburgh	5	–	5	6	–	5
Virginia Tech	5	–	5	5	–	6
Virginia	4	–	5	5	–	5
Wake Forest	3	–	4	4	–	5
Georgia Tech	3	–	6	3	–	7
Louisville	3	–	7	4	–	7
Florida State	2	–	6	3	–	6
Duke	1	–	9	2	–	9
Syracuse	1	–	9	1	–	10
Championship: Clemson 34, Notre Dame 10
^ – College Football Playoff participant; $ – Conference champion; y – Championship game participant; Rankings from AP Poll.

The 2020 Wake Forest Demon Deacons football team represented Wake Forest University during the 2020 NCAA Division I FBS football season. The team was led by seventh-year head coach Dave Clawson, and played their home games at Truist Field at Wake Forest in Winston-Salem, North Carolina, competing in the Atlantic Coast Conference (ACC).

== Schedule ==
Wake Forest had games scheduled against Appalachian State, Old Dominion, Villanova, Duke, Miami, Notre Dame, and Florida State which were all canceled due to the COVID-19 pandemic.

Date	Time	Opponent	Site	TV	Result	Attendance
September 12	7:30 p.m.	No. 1 Clemson	Truist Field at Wake Forest; Winston-Salem, NC (College GameDay)	ABC	L 13–37	68
September 19	8:00 p.m.	at NC State	Carter–Finley Stadium; Raleigh, NC (rivalry)	ACCN	L 42–45	350
October 2	7:00 p.m.	Campbell*	Truist Field at Wake Forest; Winston-Salem, NC	ACCN	W 66–14	2,058
October 17	4:00 p.m.	Virginia	Truist Field at Wake Forest; Winston-Salem, NC	ACCN	W 40–23	2,186
October 24	3:30 p.m.	No. 19 Virginia Tech	Truist Field at Wake Forest; Winston-Salem, NC	ACCRSN	W 23–16	2,135
October 31	12:00 p.m.	at Syracuse	Carrier Dome; Syracuse, NY	ACCN	W 38–14	2
November 14	12:00 p.m.	at North Carolina	Kenan Memorial Stadium; Chapel Hill, NC (rivalry)	ACCN	L 53–59	3,535
December 12	12:00 p.m.	at Louisville	Cardinal Stadium; Louisville, KY	ACCN	L 21–45	10,959
December 30	12:00 p.m.	vs. Wisconsin*	Bank of America Stadium; Charlotte, NC (Duke's Mayo Bowl)	ESPN	L 28–42	1,500
*Non-conference game; Rankings from AP Poll and CFP Rankings after November 24 released prior to game; All times are in Eastern time

The ACC released their schedule on July 29, with specific dates selected at a later date.

== Coaching staff ==
Position	Name	First Year at Wake
Head coach	Dave Clawson	2014
Asst head coach / Receivers	Kevin Higgins	2014
AHC Defense/defensive line	Dave Cohen	2014
Offensive coordinator / quarterbacks	Warren Ruggiero	2014
Defensive coordinator / Safeties	Lyle Hemphill	2017
Special teams coordinator / tight ends	Wayne Lineburg	2017
Assistant special teams coordinator / Nickelbacks	Ryan Crawford	2018
Running backs	John Hunter	2014
Offensive Line	Nick Tabacca	2014
Cornerbacks	Paul Williams	2020
Linebackers	Greg Jones	2016

== Players drafted into the NFL ==
Round	Pick	Player	Position	NFL Club
2	61	Carlos Basham Jr.	DE	Buffalo Bills
