= 2020 Syracuse Orange football team =

American college football season

2020 Syracuse Orange football
- Conference: Atlantic Coast Conference
- Record: 1–10 (1–9 ACC)
- Head coach: Dino Babers (5th season)
- Offensive coordinator: Sterlin Gilbert (1st season)
- Offensive scheme: Veer and shoot
- Defensive coordinator: Tony White (1st season)
- Base defense: 3–3–5
- Home stadium: Carrier Dome

Uniform
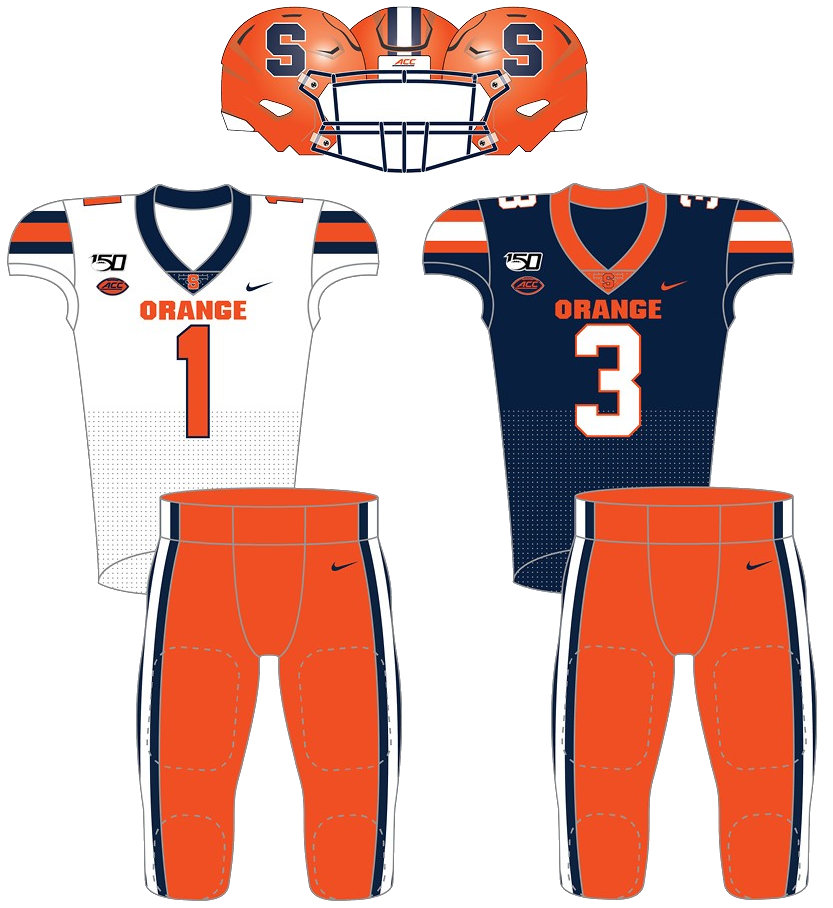

2020 Atlantic Coast Conference football standings
	Conf.			Overall
Team	W		L	W		L
No. 5 Notre Dame y^	9	–	0	10	–	2
No. 3 Clemson y$^	8	–	1	10	–	2
No. 22 Miami (FL)	7	–	2	8	–	3
No. 18 North Carolina	7	–	3	8	–	4
NC State	7	–	3	8	–	4
Boston College	5	–	5	6	–	5
Pittsburgh	5	–	5	6	–	5
Virginia Tech	5	–	5	5	–	6
Virginia	4	–	5	5	–	5
Wake Forest	3	–	4	4	–	5
Georgia Tech	3	–	6	3	–	7
Louisville	3	–	7	4	–	7
Florida State	2	–	6	3	–	6
Duke	1	–	9	2	–	9
Syracuse	1	–	9	1	–	10
Championship: Clemson 34, Notre Dame 10
^ – College Football Playoff participant; $ – Conference champion; y – Championship game participant; Rankings from AP Poll.

The 2020 Syracuse Orange football team represented Syracuse University during the 2020 NCAA Division I FBS football season. The Orange were led by fifth-year head coach Dino Babers and played their home games at the Carrier Dome, competing as members of the Atlantic Coast Conference.

Syracuse finished their season with a 1–10 record, their worst record since 2005.

== Schedule ==
Syracuse had games scheduled against Colgate, Rutgers, and Western Michigan, which were all canceled due to the COVID-19 pandemic.

Date	Time	Opponent	Site	TV	Result	Attendance
September 12	12:00 p.m.	at No. 18 North Carolina	Kenan Memorial Stadium; Chapel Hill, NC	ACCN	L 6–31	0 (Behind closed doors)
September 19	12:00 p.m.	at No. 25 Pittsburgh	Heinz Field; Pittsburgh, PA (rivalry)	ACCN	L 10–21	0 (Behind closed doors)
September 26	12:00 p.m.	Georgia Tech	Carrier Dome; Syracuse, NY	ACCRSN	W 37–20	0 (Behind closed doors)
October 10	12:30 p.m.	Duke	Carrier Dome; Syracuse, NY	ACCRSN	L 24–38	0 (Behind closed doors)
October 17	12:00 p.m.	Liberty*	Carrier Dome; Syracuse, NY	ACCRSN	L 21–38	0 (Behind closed doors)
October 24	12:00 p.m.	at No. 1 Clemson	Memorial Stadium; Clemson, SC	ACCN	L 21–47	18,629
October 31	12:00 p.m.	Wake Forest	Carrier Dome; Syracuse, NY	ACCN	L 14–38	0 (Behind closed doors)
November 7	2:00 p.m.	Boston College	Carrier Dome; Syracuse, NY	ACCRSN	L 13–16	0 (Behind closed doors)
November 20	7:30 p.m.	at Louisville	Cardinal Stadium; Louisville, KY	ESPN	L 0–30	11,192
November 28	12:00 p.m.	NC State	Carrier Dome; Syracuse, NY	ACCN	L 29–36	0 (Behind closed doors)
December 5	2:30 p.m.	at No. 2 Notre Dame	Notre Dame Stadium; South Bend, IN	NBC	L 21–45	6,831
*Non-conference game; Rankings from AP Poll and CFP Rankings after November 24 released prior to game; All times are in Eastern time

The ACC released their schedule on July 29, with specific dates selected on August 6.

== Game summaries ==
=== At North Carolina ===
	1	2	3	4	Total
Orange	0	3	3	0	6
No. 18 Tar Heels	7	0	3	21	31

=== At Pittsburgh ===
	1	2	3	4	Total
Orange	3	7	0	0	10
No. 25 Panthers	7	7	7	0	21

=== Georgia Tech ===
	1	2	3	4	Total
Yellow Jackets	0	13	7	0	20
Orange	17	6	7	7	37

=== Duke ===
	1	2	3	4	Total
Blue Devils	10	14	6	8	38
Orange	7	7	7	3	24

=== Liberty ===
	1	2	3	4	Total
Flames	14	7	14	3	38
Orange	7	7	0	7	21

=== At Clemson ===
	1	2	3	4	Total
Orange	0	14	7	0	21
No. 1 Tigers	17	10	7	13	47

=== Wake Forest ===
	1	2	3	4	Total
Demon Deacons	10	7	21	0	38
Orange	0	7	0	7	14

=== Boston College ===
	1	2	3	4	Total
Eagles	3	7	0	6	16
Orange	0	3	3	7	13

=== At Louisville ===
	1	2	3	4	Total
Orange	0	0	0	0	0
Cardinals	3	17	7	3	30

=== NC State ===
	1	2	3	4	Total
Wolfpack	7	7	13	9	36
Orange	7	15	7	0	29

=== At Notre Dame ===
	1	2	3	4	Total
Orange	0	7	7	7	21
No. 2 Fighting Irish	3	21	14	7	45

== Players drafted into the NFL ==
Round	Pick	Player	Position	NFL Club
3	65	Andre Cisco	S	Jacksonville Jaguars
3	101	Ifeatu Melifonwu	CB	Detroit Lions
