= 2020 Boston College Eagles football team =

American college football season

2020 Boston College Eagles football
- Conference: Atlantic Coast Conference
- Record: 6–5 (5–5 ACC)
- Head coach: Jeff Hafley (1st season)
- Offensive coordinator: Frank Cignetti (1st season)
- Offensive scheme: Pro-style
- Defensive coordinator: Tem Lukabu (1st season)
- Base defense: 4–3
- Home stadium: Alumni Stadium

Uniform
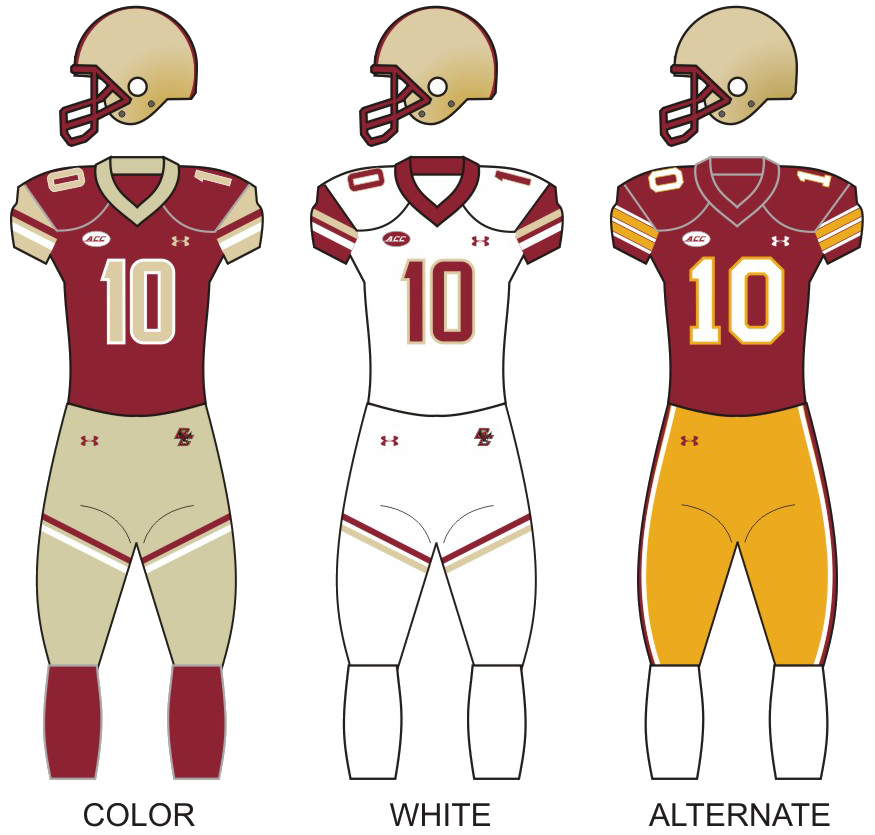

2020 Atlantic Coast Conference football standings
	Conf.			Overall
Team	W		L	W		L
No. 5 Notre Dame y^	9	–	0	10	–	2
No. 3 Clemson y$^	8	–	1	10	–	2
No. 22 Miami (FL)	7	–	2	8	–	3
No. 18 North Carolina	7	–	3	8	–	4
NC State	7	–	3	8	–	4
Boston College	5	–	5	6	–	5
Pittsburgh	5	–	5	6	–	5
Virginia Tech	5	–	5	5	–	6
Virginia	4	–	5	5	–	5
Wake Forest	3	–	4	4	–	5
Georgia Tech	3	–	6	3	–	7
Louisville	3	–	7	4	–	7
Florida State	2	–	6	3	–	6
Duke	1	–	9	2	–	9
Syracuse	1	–	9	1	–	10
Championship: Clemson 34, Notre Dame 10
^ – College Football Playoff participant; $ – Conference champion; y – Championship game participant; Rankings from AP Poll.

The 2020 Boston College Eagles football team represented Boston College during the 2020 NCAA Division I FBS football season. The Eagles played their home games at Alumni Stadium in Chestnut Hill, Massachusetts, and competed in the Atlantic Coast Conference (ACC). Led by first-year head coach Jeff Hafley, the team compiled an overall record of 6–5, and a 5–5 record in ACC games.

After the regular season concluded, the Eagles opted out from playing in a bowl game. Boston College was the first team to opt out of bowl season due to concerns over COVID-19.

== Schedule ==
Boston College had games scheduled against Holy Cross, Kansas, Ohio and Purdue, which were all canceled due to the COVID-19 pandemic.

Date	Time	Opponent	Site	TV	Result	Attendance	Source
September 19	12:00 p.m.	at Duke	Wallace Wade Stadium; Durham, NC	ACCRSN	W 26–6	0	
September 26	6:00 p.m.	Texas State*	Alumni Stadium; Chestnut Hill, MA	ACCRSN	W 24–21	0	
October 3	3:30 p.m.	No. 12 North Carolina	Alumni Stadium; Chestnut Hill, MA	ABC	L 22–26	0	
October 10	4:00 p.m.	Pittsburgh	Alumni Stadium; Chestnut Hill, MA	ACCN	W 31–30 ^{OT}	0	
October 17	8:00 p.m.	at No. 23 Virginia Tech	Lane Stadium; Blacksburg, VA (rivalry)	ACCN	L 14–40	1,000	
October 24	4:00 p.m.	Georgia Tech	Alumni Stadium; Chestnut Hill, MA	ACCN	W 48–27	0	
October 31	12:00 p.m.	at No. 1 Clemson	Memorial Stadium; Clemson, SC (O'Rourke–McFadden Trophy)	ABC	L 28–34	18,690	
November 7	2:00 p.m.	at Syracuse	Carrier Dome; Syracuse, NY	ACCRSN	W 16–13	0	
November 14	3:30 p.m.	No. 2 Notre Dame	Alumni Stadium; Chestnut Hill, MA (Holy War)	ABC	L 31–45	0	
November 28	4:00 p.m.	Louisville	Alumni Stadium; Chestnut Hill, MA	ACCN	W 34–27	0	
December 5	3:30 p.m.	at Virginia	Scott Stadium; Charlottesville, VA	ACCRSN	L 32–43	1,000	
*Non-conference game; Rankings from AP Poll and CFP Rankings after November 24 released prior to game; All times are in Eastern time

The ACC released their schedule on July 29, 2020, with specific dates selected at a later date.

== Players drafted into the NFL ==
Round	Pick	Player	Position	NFL club
3	81	Hunter Long	TE	Miami Dolphins
6	220	Isaiah McDuffie	ILB	Green Bay Packers
