= 2020 Pittsburgh Panthers football team =

American college football season

2020 Pittsburgh Panthers football
- Conference: Atlantic Coast Conference
- Record: 6–5 (5–5 ACC)
- Head coach: Pat Narduzzi (6th season)
- Offensive coordinator: Mark Whipple (2nd season)
- Offensive scheme: Pro-style
- Defensive coordinator: Randy Bates (3rd season)
- Base defense: 4–3
- Home stadium: Heinz Field

2020 Atlantic Coast Conference football standings
	Conf.			Overall
Team	W		L	W		L
No. 5 Notre Dame y^	9	–	0	10	–	2
No. 3 Clemson y$^	8	–	1	10	–	2
No. 22 Miami (FL)	7	–	2	8	–	3
No. 18 North Carolina	7	–	3	8	–	4
NC State	7	–	3	8	–	4
Boston College	5	–	5	6	–	5
Pittsburgh	5	–	5	6	–	5
Virginia Tech	5	–	5	5	–	6
Virginia	4	–	5	5	–	5
Wake Forest	3	–	4	4	–	5
Georgia Tech	3	–	6	3	–	7
Louisville	3	–	7	4	–	7
Florida State	2	–	6	3	–	6
Duke	1	–	9	2	–	9
Syracuse	1	–	9	1	–	10
Championship: Clemson 34, Notre Dame 10
^ – College Football Playoff participant; $ – Conference champion; y – Championship game participant; Rankings from AP Poll.

The 2020 Pittsburgh Panthers football team represented the University of Pittsburgh in the 2020 NCAA Division I FBS football season. The Panthers were led by sixth-year head coach Pat Narduzzi and played their home games at Heinz Field. They competed in the Atlantic Coast Conference (ACC). This was Pitt's eighth season as a member of the ACC.

After finishing their regular season with an overall record of 6–5 (5–5 in conference games), the program announced on December 11 that they would not take part in any bowl game.

== Schedule ==
Pittsburgh had games scheduled against Marshall, Miami (OH) and Richmond that were canceled due to the COVID-19 pandemic.

Date	Time	Opponent	Rank	Site	TV	Result	Attendance
September 12	4:00 p.m.	Austin Peay*		Heinz Field; Pittsburgh, PA	ACCN	W 55–0	0 (Behind closed doors)
September 19	12:00 p.m.	Syracuse	No. 25	Heinz Field; Pittsburgh, PA (rivalry)	ACCN	W 21–10	0 (Behind closed doors)
September 26	12:00 p.m.	No. 24 Louisville	No. 21	Heinz Field; Pittsburgh, PA	ACCN	W 23–20	0 (Behind closed doors)
October 3	12:00 p.m.	NC State	No. 24	Heinz Field; Pittsburgh, PA	ACCN	L 29–30	0 (Behind closed doors)
October 10	4:00 p.m.	at Boston College		Alumni Stadium; Chestnut Hill, MA	ACCN	L 30–31 ^{OT}	0 (Behind closed doors)
October 17	12:00 p.m.	at No. 13 Miami (FL)		Hard Rock Stadium; Miami Gardens, FL	ACCN	L 19–31	9,000
October 24	3:30 p.m.	No. 3 Notre Dame		Heinz Field; Pittsburgh, PA (rivalry)	ABC	L 3–45	5,451
November 7	4:00 p.m.	at Florida State		Doak Campbell Stadium; Tallahassee, FL	ACCN	W 41–17	16,568
November 21	4:00 p.m.	Virginia Tech		Heinz Field; Pittsburgh, PA	ACCN	W 47–14	4,612
November 28	3:30 p.m.	at No. 3 Clemson		Memorial Stadium; Clemson, SC	ABC	L 17–52	18,819
December 10	7:00 p.m.	at Georgia Tech		Bobby Dodd Stadium; Atlanta, GA	ACCRSN	W 34–20	11,000
*Non-conference game; Rankings from AP Poll and CFP Rankings after November 24 released prior to game; All times are in Eastern time

The ACC released their schedule on July 29, with specific dates selected on August 6.

== Rankings ==
Ranking movements Legend: ██ Increase in ranking ██ Decrease in ranking — = Not ranked RV = Received votes
	Week																	
Poll	Pre	1	2	3	4	5	6	7	8	9	10	11	12	13	14	15	16	Final
AP	—	—*	25	21	24	RV	—	—	—	—	—	—	—	—	—	—	—	—
Coaches	RV	RV*	RV	RV	25	RV	—	—	—	—	—	—	—	—	—	—	—	—
CFP	Not released												—	—	—	—	—	Not released

== Game summaries ==
=== Austin Peay ===
	1	2	3	4	Total
Governors	0	0	0	0	0
Panthers	21	21	0	13	55

=== Syracuse ===
	1	2	3	4	Total
Orange	3	7	0	0	10
No. 25 Panthers	7	7	7	0	21

=== Louisville ===
	1	2	3	4	Total
No. 24 Cardinals	7	10	3	0	20
No. 21 Panthers	13	7	3	0	23

=== NC State ===
	1	2	3	4	Total
Wolfpack	10	7	0	13	30
No. 24 Panthers	7	6	7	9	29

=== At Boston College ===
	1	2	3	4	OT	Total
Panthers	7	7	7	3	6	30
Eagles	3	14	7	0	7	31

=== At Miami (FL) ===
	1	2	3	4	Total
Panthers	0	6	13	0	19
No 13 Hurricanes	7	7	14	3	31

=== Notre Dame ===
	1	2	3	4	Total
No. 3 Fighting Irish	7	21	17	0	45
Panthers	3	0	0	0	3

=== At Florida State ===
	1	2	3	4	Total
Panthers	10	14	7	10	41
Seminoles	14	3	0	0	17

=== Virginia Tech ===
	1	2	3	4	Total
Hokies	0	14	0	0	14
Panthers	6	17	17	7	47

=== At Clemson ===
Pittsburgh at Clemson

Team	1	2	3	4	Total
Panthers	0	10	7	0	17
• No. 3 Tigers	31	7	7	7	52

- Date: November 28, 2020
- Location: Memorial Stadium
  Clemson, SC
- Game start: 3:36 p.m. EST
- Elapsed time: 3 hours and 51 minutes
- Game attendance: 18,819
- Game weather: Temperature: 68 °F (20 °C) • Weather: Sunny • Wind: SE 1 MPH
- Referee: Marcus Woods
- TV announcers (ABC): Sean McDonough (play–by–play), Todd Blackledge (analyst) and Todd McShay (sideline)

Scoring summary
1	11:36	CU	E.J. Williams 5-yard pass from Trevor Lawrence (B.T. Potter kick) (3 plays, 16 yards, 0:56)	CU 7–0
1	09:26	CU	B.T. Potter 46-yard field goal (6 plays, 52 yards, 1:30)	CU 10–0
1	07:35	CU	Cornell Powell 43-yard pass from Trevor Lawrence (B.T. Potter kick) (4 plays, 65 yards, 1:42)	CU 17–0
1	04:55	CU	Travis Etienne 2-yard run (B.T. Potter kick) (5 plays, 35 yards, 2:14)	CU 24–0
1	00:05	CU	Lyn-J Dixon 1-yard run (B.T. Potter kick) (7 plays, 82 yards, 2:58)	CU 31–0
2	09:11	PIT	Alex Kessman 23-yard field goal (7 plays, 37 yards, 2:53)	CU 31–3
2	07:59	CU	Chez Mellusi 2-yard run (B.T. Potter kick) (4 plays, 75 yards, 1:12)	CU 38–3
2	01:13	PIT	Jordan Addison 18-yard pass from Kenny Pickett (Alex Kessman kick) (11 plays, 75 yards, 3:19)	CU 38–10
3	14:24	PIT	Vincent Davis 4-yard pass from Kenny Pickett (Alex Kessman kick) (2 plays, 19 yards, 0:23)	CU 38–17
3	00:52	CU	Travis Etienne 3-yard run (B.T. Potter kick) (10 plays, 89 yards, 3:44)	CU 45–17
4	10:48	CU	Chez Mellusi 9-yard pass from D.J. Uiagalelei (B.T. Potter kick) (10 plays, 41 yards, 4:07)	CU 52–17

Statistics	Pittsburgh	Clemson
First downs	12	27
Total yards	246	581
Rushing yards	16	145
Passing yards	230	436
Turnovers	3	2
Time of possession	23:28	36:32

Team	Category	Player	Statistics
Pittsburgh	Passing	Kenny Pickett	22/39, 209 yards, 2 TDs, 4 INTs
Pittsburgh	Rushing	A.J. Davis	4 carries, 21 yards
Pittsburgh	Receiving	Jared Wayne	5 receptions, 62 yards
Clemson	Passing	Trevor Lawrence	26/37, 403 yards, 2 TDs
Clemson	Rushing	Travis Etienne	11 carries, 58 yards, 2 TDs
Clemson	Receiving	Cornell Powell	6 receptions, 176 yards, 1 TD

=== At Georgia Tech ===
	1	2	3	4	Total
Panthers	3	13	7	11	34
Yellow Jackets	7	0	6	7	20

== Players drafted into the NFL ==
Round	Pick	Player	Position	NFL Club
3	90	Patrick Jones II	DE	Minnesota Vikings
4	135	Rashad Weaver	DE	Tennessee Titans
5	175	Jason Pinnock	DB	New York Jets
6	199	Jaylen Twyman	DT	Minnesota Vikings
6	212	Damar Hamlin	DB	Buffalo Bills
7	230	Jimmy Morrissey	C	Las Vegas Raiders
