= 2020 Florida State Seminoles football team =

American college football season

2020 Florida State Seminoles football
- Conference: Atlantic Coast Conference
- Record: 3–6 (2–6 ACC)
- Head coach: Mike Norvell (1st season)
- Offensive coordinator: Kenny Dillingham (1st season)
- Offensive scheme: Spread
- Defensive coordinator: Adam Fuller (1st season)
- Base defense: 4–3
- Captain: Game captains
- Home stadium: Doak Campbell Stadium

2020 Atlantic Coast Conference football standings
	Conf.			Overall
Team	W		L	W		L
No. 5 Notre Dame y^	9	–	0	10	–	2
No. 3 Clemson y$^	8	–	1	10	–	2
No. 22 Miami (FL)	7	–	2	8	–	3
No. 18 North Carolina	7	–	3	8	–	4
NC State	7	–	3	8	–	4
Boston College	5	–	5	6	–	5
Pittsburgh	5	–	5	6	–	5
Virginia Tech	5	–	5	5	–	6
Virginia	4	–	5	5	–	5
Wake Forest	3	–	4	4	–	5
Georgia Tech	3	–	6	3	–	7
Louisville	3	–	7	4	–	7
Florida State	2	–	6	3	–	6
Duke	1	–	9	2	–	9
Syracuse	1	–	9	1	–	10
Championship: Clemson 34, Notre Dame 10
^ – College Football Playoff participant; $ – Conference champion; y – Championship game participant; Rankings from AP Poll.

The 2020 Florida State Seminoles football team represented Florida State University during the 2020 NCAA Division I FBS football season. The Seminoles played their home games at Doak Campbell Stadium in Tallahassee, Florida, and competed as members of the Atlantic Coast Conference. They were led by head coach Mike Norvell, in his first season.

The Seminoles finished the season with a losing record for the third consecutive season for the first time since the 1974–1976 seasons and their worst record since 1975.

== Schedule ==
Florida State had games scheduled against Boise State, Florida, Samford, and West Virginia, which were all canceled due to the COVID-19 pandemic, which resulted in the ACC playing a ten-game conference schedule with one non-conference opponent and reduced stadium capacity. Florida State ended up playing nine games as the result of further cancelations of games against Clemson and Wake Forest. This was the first season since 1957 that the Seminoles did not play Florida.

The Seminoles were picked to finish in seventh place in the ACC, while Marvin Wilson, Hamsah Nasirildeen, Tamorrion Terry and Asante Samuel, Jr. were selected to the preseason All-ACC team.

Date	Time	Opponent	Site	TV	Result	Attendance	Source
September 12	4:00 p.m.	Georgia Tech	Doak Campbell Stadium; Tallahassee, FL	ABC	L 13–16	17,538	
September 26	7:30 p.m.	at No. 12 Miami (FL)	Hard Rock Stadium; Miami Gardens, FL (rivalry, College GameDay)	ABC	L 10–52	12,806	
October 3	4:00 p.m.	Jacksonville State*	Doak Campbell Stadium; Tallahassee, FL	ACCRSN	W 41–24	13,589	
October 10	7:30 p.m.	at No. 5 Notre Dame	Notre Dame Stadium; South Bend, IN (rivalry)	NBC	L 26–42	10,409	
October 17	7:30 p.m.	No. 5 North Carolina	Doak Campbell Stadium; Tallahassee, FL	ABC	W 31–28	18,016	
October 24	12:00 p.m.	at Louisville	Cardinal Stadium; Louisville, KY	ACCRSN	L 16–48	11,465	
November 7	4:00 p.m.	Pittsburgh	Doak Campbell Stadium; Tallahassee, FL	ACCN	L 17–41	16,568	
November 14	7:30 p.m.	at NC State	Carter–Finley Stadium; Raleigh, NC	ACCN	L 22–38	4,032	
December 12^{[a]}	4:00 p.m.	Duke	Doak Campbell Stadium; Tallahassee, FL	ACCN	W 56–35	14,872	
*Non-conference game; Rankings from AP Poll released prior to the game; All times are in Eastern time

^{^[a]}The game between Florida State and Duke was originally scheduled to take place on December 5 at Wallace Wade Stadium in Durham, North Carolina. However, due to COVID-19 management requirements in response to positive tests and subsequent quarantine of individuals within the Florida State program which led to the cancelation of the two prior games, the game was rescheduled for December 12 in Tallahassee.

== Game summaries ==
=== Georgia Tech ===
	1	2	3	4	Total
Yellow Jackets	0	0	7	9	16
Seminoles	10	0	3	0	13

In Mike Norvell's debut, the Seminoles fell 16–13 to the Yellow Jackets in their fourth-straight season opening loss and the first win for the Yellow Jackets against the Seminoles in Tallahassee since 2009.

=== Miami (FL) ===
	1	2	3	4	Total
Seminoles	3	0	7	0	10
#12 Hurricanes	14	24	0	14	52

On September 19, it was announced that head coach Mike Norvell had tested positive for COVID-19 and would be quarantining as a result. Chris Thomsen, the deputy head coach, handled on-field coaching duties for the game.

The Seminoles fell 52–10 to the Hurricanes to mark their fourth-straight loss in the series and suffering their second largest loss to their rival.

=== Jacksonville State ===
	1	2	3	4	Total
Gamecocks	14	7	3	0	24
Seminoles	0	14	20	7	41

The Seminoles overcame an early fourteen-point deficit to defeat the Gamecocks, 41–24, in their lone non-conference game to secure the team's first victory of the season as well as Norvell's first win as head coach.

=== Notre Dame ===
	1	2	3	4	Total
Seminoles	17	3	6	0	26
#5 Fighting Irish	14	21	7	0	42

Prior to the game, Jordan Travis was named the starter at quarterback, making him the third player to start at the position throughout the first four games of the season.

The Seminoles were beaten by the Irish, 42–26, in their first and only meeting as conference foes.

=== North Carolina ===
	1	2	3	4	Total
#5 Tar Heels	0	7	14	7	28
Seminoles	7	24	0	0	31

Entering the game as a double-digit underdog, Florida State built up a twenty-four point halftime lead and survived a second-half rally to defeat the Tar Heels, and alum Mack Brown, by a score of 31–28, giving Mike Norvell his first win over a ranked team as head coach of the Seminoles.

=== Louisville ===
	1	2	3	4	Total
Seminoles	7	7	2	0	16
Cardinals	21	10	7	10	48

The Seminoles were beaten by Louisville, the former school of quarterback Jordan Travis, by a score of 48–16.

=== Pittsburgh ===
	1	2	3	4	Total
Panthers	10	14	7	10	41
Seminoles	14	3	0	0	17

In only their second meeting since Pittsburgh joined the conference, the Seminoles lost to the Panthers by a score of 41–17, in a game that featured three turnovers by the Florida State offense and seven sacks by the Pitt defense.

=== NC State ===
	1	2	3	4	Total
Seminoles	0	3	6	13	22
Wolfpack	7	14	14	3	38

Starting their fourth quarterback of the season due to injury, the Seminoles fell to the Wolfpack, led by former Florida State quarterback Bailey Hockman, by a score of 38–22.

=== Duke ===
	1	2	3	4	Total
Blue Devils	7	14	0	14	35
Seminoles	28	0	14	14	56

Playing their first game in nearly a month due to issues pertaining to the pandemic, the Seminoles built up an early lead and survived a comeback attempt to defeat the Blue Devils 56–35 on Senior Day. Jordan Travis broke the school record for rushing yards in a season by a quarterback.

== Coaching staff ==
Florida State Seminoles coaches

Head coach

- Mike Norvell

Assistant coaches

- Kenny Dillingham – offensive coordinator/quarterbacks
- Adam Fuller – defensive coordinator
- John Papuchis – special teams/defensive ends
- Chris Thomsen – deputy head coach/tight ends
- Odell Haggins – associate head coach/defensive tackles
- Alex Atkins – offensive line
- Ron Dugans – wide receivers
- David Johnson – running backs/recruiting coordinator
- Chris Marve – linebackers/defensive run game coordinator
- Marcus Woodson – defensive backs/defensive passing game coordinator
- Josh Storms – strength and conditioning

== Watchlists ==
Award	Player
Lott Trophy	Marvin Wilson
Bednarik Award	Marvin Wilson; Hamsah Nasirildeen
Doak Walker Award	Jashaun Corbin
Biletnikoff Award	Tamorrion Terry
Thorpe Award	Hamsah Nasirildeen
Outland Trophy	Marvin Wilson
Bronko Nagurski Trophy	Marvin Wilson; Hamsah Nasirildeen
Wuerffel Trophy	Jaiden Lars-Woodbey
Maxwell Award	Marvin Wilson; Tamorrion Terry
Johnny Unitas Golden Arm Award	James Blackman

== Honors ==
Weekly awards
Player	Award	Week Awarded	Ref.
Asante Samuel Jr.	ACC Defensive Back of the Week	Week 1	
Marvin Wilson	ACC Specialist of the Week	Week 1	
Lawrance Toafili	ACC Rookie of the Week	Week 4	
Mike Norvell	Dodd Trophy Coach of the Week	Week 6	
Hamsah Nasirildeen	ACC Defensive Back of the Week	Week 14	

Yearly awards
Player	Award	Ref.
Asante Samuel Jr.	All-ACC First Team	
Marvin Wilson	All-ACC Second Team	
Robert Scott	Freshman All-American	

== Players drafted into the NFL ==
Round	Pick	Player	Position	NFL Club
2	47	Asante Samuel Jr.	CB	Los Angeles Chargers
4	134	Janarius Robinson	DE	Minnesota Vikings
4	144	Joshua Kaindoh	DE	Kansas City Chiefs
6	186	Hamsah Nasirildeen	S	New York Jets
