= Elijah Roberts =

American football player (born 2001)

No. 95 – Tampa Bay Buccaneers
- Position: Defensive tackle
- Roster status: Active

Personal information
- Born: December 24, 2001 (age 24)
- Listed height: 6 ft 4 in (1.93 m)
- Listed weight: 295 lb (134 kg)

Career information
- High school: Christopher Columbus (Westchester, Florida)
- College: Miami (2020–2022); SMU (2023–2025)
- NFL draft: 2025: 5th round, 157th overall pick

Career history
- Tampa Bay Buccaneers (2025–present)

Awards and highlights
- Second-team All-AAC (2023)

Career NFL statistics as of Week 18, 2025
- Total tackles: 14
- Sacks: 2
- Fumble recoveries: 1
- Pass deflections: 3
- Stats at Pro Football Reference

Elijah Roberts (born December 24, 2001) is an American professional football defensive tackle for the Tampa Bay Buccaneers of the National Football League (NFL). He played college football for the Miami Hurricanes and SMU Mustangs. Roberts was selected by the Buccaneers in the fifth round of the 2025 NFL draft.

== Early life ==
Roberts attended Christopher Columbus High School in Miami-Dade County, Florida, and led the football team to a class 8A state title. Coming out of high school, he was rated as a four-star recruit and held offers from schools such as South Carolina, Indiana, Florida State, Louisville, Penn State, Miami, Oregon, Michigan and Georgia Tech. Roberts committed to play college football for the Miami Hurricanes.

== College career ==
=== Miami ===
In three years at Miami from 2020 through 2022, Roberts appeared in 20 games with one start for the Hurricanes, where he totaled 21 tackles with two being for a loss, half a sack, and a forced fumble. After the conclusion of the 2022 season, he entered his name into the NCAA transfer portal.

=== SMU ===
Roberts transferred to play for the SMU Mustangs. In 2023, he started all 14 games, where he notched 37 tackles with 12.5 being for a loss, ten sacks, and two forced fumbles, earning second-team all-American Athletic Conference honors.

== Professional career ==
Pre-draft measurables
Height	Weight	Arm length	Hand span	Wingspan	40-yard dash	10-yard split	20-yard split	20-yard shuttle	Vertical jump	Broad jump	Bench press
6 ft 3 5/8 in (1.92 m)	285 lb (129 kg)	33 5/8 in (0.85 m)	10 1/4 in (0.26 m)	6 ft 10 1/2 in (2.10 m)	4.78 s	1.67 s	2.78 s	4.78 s	31.5 in (0.80 m)	9 ft 8 in (2.95 m)	25 reps
All values from NFL Combine/Pro Day

Roberts was selected by the Tampa Bay Buccaneers with the 157th pick in the fifth round of the 2025 NFL draft.

== NFL career statistics ==
=== Regular season ===
Year	Team	Games		Tackles					Interceptions						Fumbles				
Year	Team	GP	GS	Cmb	Solo	Ast	Sck	TFL	Int	Yds	Avg	Lng	TD	PD	FF	Fmb	FR	Yds	TD
2025	TB	17	9	14	10	4	2.0	2	0	0	0.0	0	0	3	0	0	1	0	0
Career		17	9	14	10	4	2.0	2	0	0	0.0	0	0	3	0	0	1	0	0
