= 2020 Duke Blue Devils football team =

American college football season

2020 Duke Blue Devils football
- Conference: Atlantic Coast Conference
- Record: 2–9 (1–9 ACC)
- Head coach: David Cutcliffe (13th season)
- Offensive coordinator: Zac Roper (5th season)
- Offensive scheme: Multiple
- Co-defensive coordinators: Ben Albert (3rd season); Matt Guerrieri (3rd season)
- Base defense: 4–2–5
- Captains: Michael Carter II; Noah Gray; Deon Jackson; Chris Rumph II; Jack Wohlabaugh
- Home stadium: Wallace Wade Stadium

Uniform
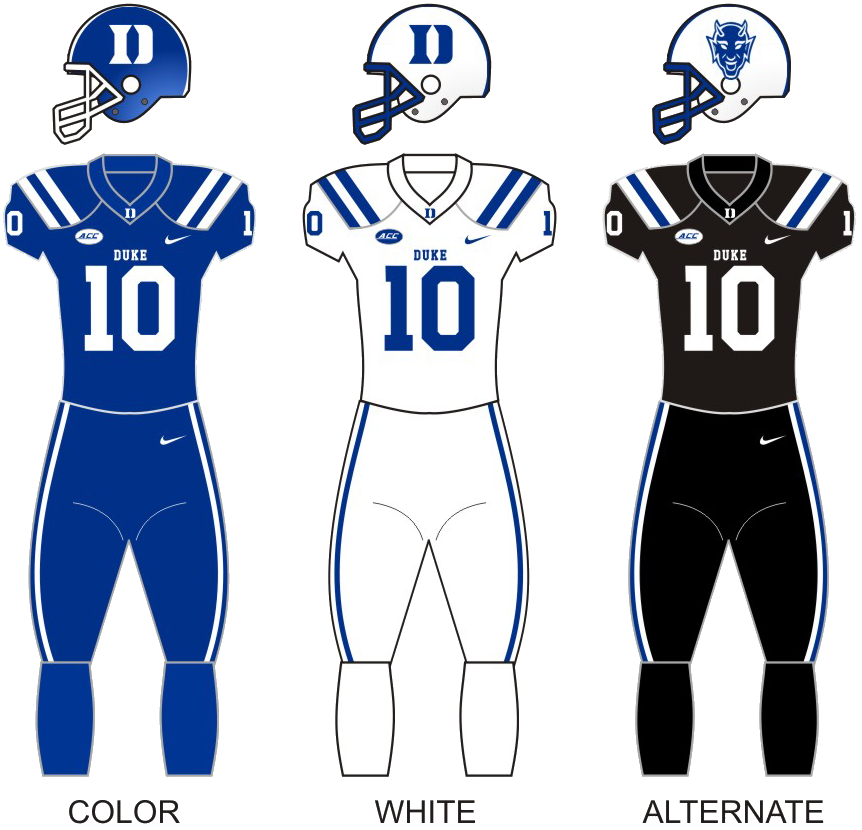

2020 Atlantic Coast Conference football standings
	Conf.			Overall
Team	W		L	W		L
No. 5 Notre Dame y^	9	–	0	10	–	2
No. 3 Clemson y$^	8	–	1	10	–	2
No. 22 Miami (FL)	7	–	2	8	–	3
No. 18 North Carolina	7	–	3	8	–	4
NC State	7	–	3	8	–	4
Boston College	5	–	5	6	–	5
Pittsburgh	5	–	5	6	–	5
Virginia Tech	5	–	5	5	–	6
Virginia	4	–	5	5	–	5
Wake Forest	3	–	4	4	–	5
Georgia Tech	3	–	6	3	–	7
Louisville	3	–	7	4	–	7
Florida State	2	–	6	3	–	6
Duke	1	–	9	2	–	9
Syracuse	1	–	9	1	–	10
Championship: Clemson 34, Notre Dame 10
^ – College Football Playoff participant; $ – Conference champion; y – Championship game participant; Rankings from AP Poll.

The 2020 Duke Blue Devils football team represented Duke University in the 2020 NCAA Division I FBS football season as a member of the Atlantic Coast Conference (ACC). The Blue Devils were led by head coach David Cutcliffe, in his 13th year, and played their home games at Wallace Wade Stadium in Durham, North Carolina.

== Schedule ==
Duke had games scheduled against Charlotte, Elon, Middle Tennessee, and Wake Forest, which were all canceled due to the COVID-19 pandemic.

Date	Time	Opponent	Site	TV	Result	Attendance
September 12	2:30 p.m.	at No. 10 Notre Dame	Notre Dame Stadium; Notre Dame, IN	NBC	L 13–27	10,097
September 19	12:00 p.m.	Boston College	Wallace Wade Stadium; Durham, NC	ACCRSN	L 6–26	0 (Behind closed doors)
September 26	4:00 p.m.	at Virginia	Scott Stadium; Charlottesville, VA	ACCN	L 20–38	0 (Behind closed doors)
October 3	4:00 p.m.	Virginia Tech	Wallace Wade Stadium; Durham, NC	ACCN	L 31–38	0 (Behind closed doors)
October 10	12:30 p.m.	at Syracuse	Carrier Dome; Syracuse, NY	ACCRSN	W 38–24	0 (Behind closed doors)
October 17	3:30 p.m.	at NC State	Carter–Finley Stadium; Raleigh, NC (rivalry)	ACCRSN	L 20–31	4,032
October 31	7:00 p.m.	Charlotte*	Wallace Wade Stadium; Durham, NC	ACCRSN	W 53–19	0 (Behind closed doors)
November 7	12:00 p.m.	North Carolina	Wallace Wade Stadium; Durham, NC (Victory Bell)	ESPN2	L 24–56	0 (Behind closed doors)
November 28	7:00 p.m.	at Georgia Tech	Bobby Dodd Stadium; Atlanta, GA	ACCRSN	L 33–56	11,000
December 5	8:00 p.m.	No. 10 Miami (FL)	Wallace Wade Stadium; Durham, NC	ACCN	L 0–48	0 (Behind closed doors)
December 12	4:30 p.m.	at Florida State	Doak Campbell Stadium; Tallahassee, FL	ACCN	L 35–56	14,872
*Non-conference game; Rankings from AP Poll and CFP Rankings after November 24 released prior to game; All times are in Eastern time

The ACC released their schedule on July 29, with specific dates selected at a later date.

== Rankings ==
Ranking movements Legend: — = Not ranked RV = Received votes
	Week															
Poll	Pre	1	2	3	4	5	6	7	8	9	10	11	12	13	14	Final
AP	—															
Coaches	RV		RV													
CFP	Not released															Not released

== Game summaries ==
=== At Notre Dame ===
	1	2	3	4	Total
Blue Devils	3	3	7	0	13
No. 10 Fighting Irish	0	10	7	10	27

=== Boston College ===
	1	2	3	4	Total
Eagles	7	0	16	3	26
Blue Devils	6	0	0	0	6

=== At Virginia ===
	1	2	3	4	Total
Blue Devils	10	0	10	0	20
Cavaliers	0	17	0	21	38

=== Virginia Tech ===
	1	2	3	4	Total
Hokies	7	3	14	14	38
Blue Devils	7	0	7	17	31

=== At Syracuse ===
	1	2	3	4	Total
Blue Devils	10	14	6	8	38
Orange	7	7	7	3	24

=== At NC State ===
	1	2	3	4	Total
Blue Devils	7	13	0	0	20
Wolfpack	0	14	7	10	31

=== Charlotte ===
	1	2	3	4	Total
49ers	0	7	6	6	19
Blue Devils	17	7	13	16	53

=== North Carolina ===
	1	2	3	4	Total
Tar Heels	21	21	7	7	56
Blue Devils	0	10	7	7	24

=== At Georgia Tech ===
	1	2	3	4	Total
Blue Devils	7	19	7	0	33
Yellow Jackets	14	14	14	14	56

=== No. 10 Miami (FL) ===
	1	2	3	4	Total
Hurricanes	14	7	21	6	48
Blue Devils	0	0	0	0	0

=== Florida State ===
	1	2	3	4	Total
Blue Devils	7	14	0	14	35
Seminoles	28	0	14	14	56

== Players drafted into the NFL ==
Round	Pick	Player	Position	NFL Club
4	118	Chris Rumph II	OLB	Los Angeles Chargers
5	154	Michael Carter II	S	New York Jets
5	162	Noah Gray	TE	Kansas City Chiefs
6	210	Victor Dimukeje	DE	Arizona Cardinals
