= 2020 Louisville Cardinals football team =

American college football season

2020 Louisville Cardinals football
- Conference: Atlantic Coast Conference
- Record: 4–7 (3–7 ACC)
- Head coach: Scott Satterfield (2nd season)
- Offensive coordinator: Dwayne Ledford (2nd season)
- Offensive scheme: Spread option
- Defensive coordinator: Bryan Brown (2nd season)
- Base defense: 4–2–5
- Home stadium: Cardinal Stadium

Uniform
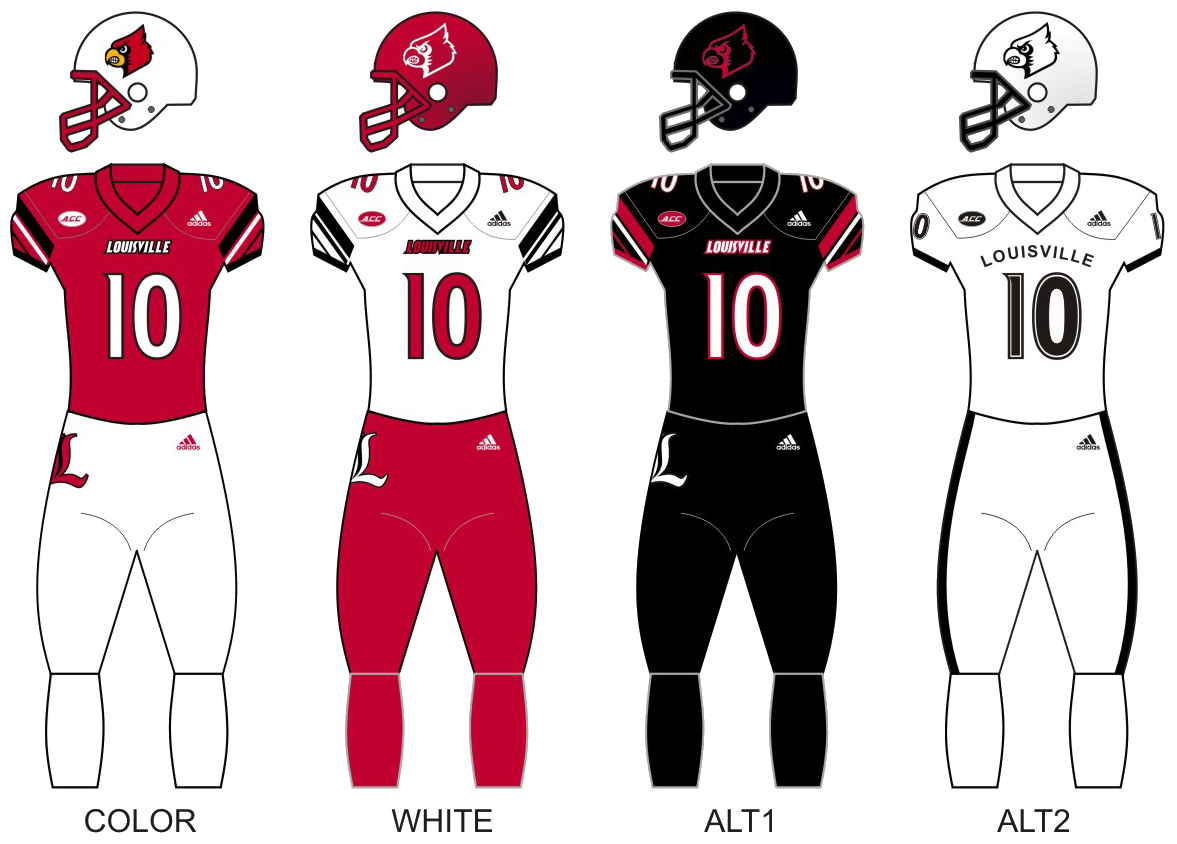

2020 Atlantic Coast Conference football standings
	Conf.			Overall
Team	W		L	W		L
No. 5 Notre Dame y^	9	–	0	10	–	2
No. 3 Clemson y$^	8	–	1	10	–	2
No. 22 Miami (FL)	7	–	2	8	–	3
No. 18 North Carolina	7	–	3	8	–	4
NC State	7	–	3	8	–	4
Boston College	5	–	5	6	–	5
Pittsburgh	5	–	5	6	–	5
Virginia Tech	5	–	5	5	–	6
Virginia	4	–	5	5	–	5
Wake Forest	3	–	4	4	–	5
Georgia Tech	3	–	6	3	–	7
Louisville	3	–	7	4	–	7
Florida State	2	–	6	3	–	6
Duke	1	–	9	2	–	9
Syracuse	1	–	9	1	–	10
Championship: Clemson 34, Notre Dame 10
^ – College Football Playoff participant; $ – Conference champion; y – Championship game participant; Rankings from AP Poll.

The 2020 Louisville Cardinals football team represented the University of Louisville during the 2020 NCAA Division I FBS football season. This was the team's second season under head coach Scott Satterfield. The Cardinals played their home games at Cardinal Stadium, formerly known as Papa John's Cardinal Stadium, in Louisville, Kentucky, as a member of the Atlantic Coast Conference (ACC).

After compiling a 4–7 regular season record (3–7 in ACC play), Satterfield advised in mid-December that "we aren’t in line for a bowl" after Louisville's director of athletics conferred with ACC officials.

== Schedule ==
Louisville had games scheduled against Kentucky, and Murray State, which were all canceled due to the COVID-19 pandemic. This will be the first season since 1993 that the Cardinals do not play Kentucky.

Date	Time	Opponent	Rank	Site	TV	Result	Attendance
September 12	8:00 p.m.	Western Kentucky*		Cardinal Stadium; Louisville, KY	ACCN	W 35–21	11,179
September 19	7:30 p.m.	No. 17 Miami	No. 18	Cardinal Stadium; Louisville, KY (rivalry)	ABC	L 34–47	12,120
September 26	12:00 p.m.	at No. 21 Pittsburgh	No. 24	Heinz Field; Pittsburgh, PA	ACCN	L 20–23	0 (Behind closed doors)
October 9	7:00 p.m.	at Georgia Tech		Bobby Dodd Stadium; Atlanta, GA	ESPN	L 27–46	11,000
October 17	2:30 p.m.	at No. 4 Notre Dame		Notre Dame Stadium; South Bend, IN	NBC	L 7–12	10,182
October 24	12:00 p.m.	Florida State		Cardinal Stadium; Louisville, KY	ACCRSN	W 48–16	11,465
October 31	4:00 p.m.	Virginia Tech		Cardinal Stadium; Louisville, KY	ACCN	L 35–42	11,901
November 14	8:00 p.m.	at Virginia		Scott Stadium; Charlottesville, VA	ACCN	L 17–31	1,000
November 20	7:30 p.m.	Syracuse		Cardinal Stadium; Louisville, KY	ESPN	W 30–0	11,192
November 28	4:00 p.m.	at Boston College		Alumni Stadium; Chestnut Hill, MA	ACCN	L 27–34	0 (Behind closed doors)
December 12	12:00 p.m.	Wake Forest		Cardinal Stadium; Louisville, KY	ACCN	W 45–21	10,959
*Non-conference game; Rankings from AP Poll and CFP Rankings after November 24 released prior to game; All times are in Eastern time

The ACC released their schedule on July 29, with specific dates selected on August 6.

== Rankings ==
Ranking movements Legend: ██ Increase in ranking ██ Decrease in ranking — = Not ranked RV = Received votes
	Week															
Poll	Pre	1	2	3	4	5	6	7	8	9	10	11	12	13	14	Final
AP	RV	RV*	18	24	RV											
Coaches	RV	RV*	16	RV	—											
CFP	Not released															Not released

== Game summaries ==
=== Western Kentucky ===
	1	2	3	4	Total
Hilltoppers	7	7	0	7	21
Cardinals	7	21	7	0	35

=== Miami ===
	1	2	3	4	Total
No. 17 Hurricanes	14	6	17	10	47
No. 18 Cardinals	3	3	14	14	34

=== At No. 21 Panthers ===
	1	2	3	4	Total
No. 24 Cardinals	7	10	3	0	20
No. 21 Panthers	13	7	3	0	23

=== At Georgia Tech ===
	1	2	3	4	Total
Cardinals	7	14	6	0	27
Yellow Jackets	7	7	12	20	46

=== At Notre Dame ===
	1	2	3	4	Total
Cardinals	0	0	7	0	7
Fighting Irish	6	0	6	0	12

=== Florida State ===
	1	2	3	4	Total
Seminoles	7	7	2	0	16
Cardinals	21	10	7	10	48

=== Virginia Tech ===
	1	2	3	4	Total
Hokies	14	7	7	14	42
Cardinals	0	14	0	21	35

=== At Virginia ===
	1	2	3	4	Total
Cardinals	3	7	7	0	17
Cavaliers	7	7	7	10	31

=== Syracuse ===
	1	2	3	4	Total
Orange	0	0	0	0	0
Cardinals	3	17	7	3	30

=== At Boston College ===
	1	2	3	4	Total
Cardnials	3	7	3	14	27
Eagles	7	6	7	14	34

=== Wake Forest ===
	1	2	3	4	Total
Demon Deacons	7	3	3	8	21
Cardinals	0	21	7	17	45

== Players drafted into the NFL ==
Round	Pick	Player	Position	NFL Club
2	57	Tutu Atwell	WR	Los Angeles Rams
4	109	Dez Fitzpatrick	WR	Tennessee Titans
