= 2020 Virginia Cavaliers football team =

American college football season

2020 Virginia Cavaliers football
- Conference: Atlantic Coast Conference
- Record: 5–5 (4–5 ACC)
- Head coach: Bronco Mendenhall (5th season)
- Offensive coordinator: Robert Anae (5th season)
- Offensive scheme: Multiple
- Defensive coordinator: Nick Howell (5th season)
- Co-defensive coordinator: Kelly Poppinga (3rd season)
- Base defense: 3–4
- Home stadium: Scott Stadium

2020 Atlantic Coast Conference football standings
	Conf.			Overall
Team	W		L	W		L
No. 5 Notre Dame y^	9	–	0	10	–	2
No. 3 Clemson y$^	8	–	1	10	–	2
No. 22 Miami (FL)	7	–	2	8	–	3
No. 18 North Carolina	7	–	3	8	–	4
NC State	7	–	3	8	–	4
Boston College	5	–	5	6	–	5
Pittsburgh	5	–	5	6	–	5
Virginia Tech	5	–	5	5	–	6
Virginia	4	–	5	5	–	5
Wake Forest	3	–	4	4	–	5
Georgia Tech	3	–	6	3	–	7
Louisville	3	–	7	4	–	7
Florida State	2	–	6	3	–	6
Duke	1	–	9	2	–	9
Syracuse	1	–	9	1	–	10
Championship: Clemson 34, Notre Dame 10
^ – College Football Playoff participant; $ – Conference champion; y – Championship game participant; Rankings from AP Poll.

The 2020 Virginia Cavaliers football team represented the University of Virginia during the 2020 NCAA Division I FBS football season. The Cavaliers were led by fifth-year head coach Bronco Mendenhall and played their home games at Scott Stadium. The team competed as members of the Atlantic Coast Conference (ACC).

After completing their regular season with an overall 5–5 record (4–5 in ACC play), the program announced on December 13 that it would not participate in any bowl game.

== Schedule ==
Virginia had games scheduled against Georgia, Old Dominion, UConn, VMI, and Florida State, which were all canceled due to the COVID-19 pandemic.

Date	Time	Opponent	Site	TV	Result	Attendance
September 26	4:00 p.m.	Duke	Scott Stadium; Charlottesville, VA	ACCN	W 38–20	0 (Behind closed doors)
October 3	8:00 p.m.	at No. 1 Clemson	Memorial Stadium; Clemson, SC	ACCN	L 23–41	18,735
October 10	12:00 p.m.	NC State	Scott Stadium; Charlottesville, VA	ACCN	L 21–38	1,000
October 17	4:00 p.m.	at Wake Forest	Truist Field at Wake Forest; Winston-Salem, NC	ACCN	L 23–40	2,186
October 24	8:00 p.m.	at No. 11 Miami (FL)	Hard Rock Stadium; Miami Gardens, FL	ACCN	L 14–19	9,940
October 31	8:00 p.m.	No. 15 North Carolina	Scott Stadium; Charlottesville, VA (South's Oldest Rivalry)	ACCN	W 44–41	1,000
November 14	12:00 p.m.	Louisville	Scott Stadium; Charlottesville, VA	ACCN	W 31–17	1,000
November 21	4:00 p.m.	Abilene Christian*	Scott Stadium; Charlottesville, VA	ACCRSN	W 55–15	1,000
December 5	3:30 p.m.	Boston College	Scott Stadium; Charlottesville, VA	ACCRSN	W 43–32	250
December 12	8:00 p.m.	at Virginia Tech	Lane Stadium; Blacksburg, VA (Commonwealth Cup)	ACCN	L 15–33	250
*Non-conference game; Rankings from AP Poll and CFP Rankings after November 24 released prior to game; All times are in Eastern time

The ACC released their schedule on July 29, with specific dates selected at a later date.

== Rankings ==
Ranking movements Legend: RV = Received votes
	Week															
Poll	Pre	1	2	3	4	5	6	7	8	9	10	11	12	13	14	Final
AP	RV	RV*	RV	RV												
Coaches	RV	RV*	RV	RV	RV											
CFP	Not released															Not released
