= 2022 Atlantic Coast Conference football season =

2022 ACC Football season
- League: NCAA Division I Football Bowl Subdivision
- Sport: Football
- Duration: August 27, 2022 to December 30, 2022
- Teams: 14

2023 NFL draft
- Top draft pick: DT Calijah Kancey, Pittsburgh
- Picked by: Tampa Bay Buccaneers, 19th overall

Regular season
- Atlantic champions: Clemson
- Atlantic runners-up: Florida State
- Coastal champions: North Carolina
- Coastal runners-up: Pittsburgh/Duke

ACC Championship Game
- Champions: Clemson
- Runners-up: North Carolina
- Finals MVP: Cade Klubnik (Clemson)

Seasons
- ← 2021 2023 →

2022 Atlantic Coast Conference football standings
	Conf.			Overall
Team	W		L	W		L
Atlantic Division
No. 13 Clemson xy$	8	–	0	11	–	3
No. 11 Florida State	5	–	3	10	–	3
Louisville	4	–	4	8	–	5
NC State	4	–	4	8	–	5
Syracuse	4	–	4	7	–	6
Wake Forest	3	–	5	8	–	5
Boston College	2	–	6	3	–	9
Coastal Division
North Carolina xy	6	–	2	9	–	5
Duke	5	–	3	9	–	4
No. 22 Pittsburgh	5	–	3	9	–	4
Georgia Tech	4	–	4	5	–	7
Miami (FL)	3	–	5	5	–	7
Virginia	1	–	6	3	–	7
Virginia Tech	1	–	6	3	–	8
Championship: Clemson 39, North Carolina 10
$ – Conference champion; x – Division champion/co-champions; y – Championship game participant; Rankings from AP Poll

The 2022 Atlantic Coast Conference football season, part of the 2022 NCAA Division I FBS football season, was the 70th season of college football played for the Atlantic Coast Conference (ACC). The ACC consisted of 14 members in two divisions. The entire schedule was released on January 31, 2022. This was the last season that the conference used divisions in its football scheduling.

== Preseason ==
=== Recruiting classes ===
National rankings
Team	ESPN	Rivals	24/7	On3 Recruits	Total signees
Boston College	38	38	40	49	22
Clemson	4	10	10	14	20
Duke	N/A	51	52	55	18
Florida State	19	17	20	19	18
Georgia Tech	34	52	54	53	15
Louisville	30	48	51	51	16
Miami	9	31	16	11	15
North Carolina	7	11	11	10	17
NC State	31	68	64	59	12
Pittsburgh	33	63	76	64	13
Syracuse	N/A	69	68	63	16
Virginia	32	63	66	68	16
Virginia Tech	N/A	41	36	38	24
Wake Forest	N/A	76	71	62	13

Note: ESPN only ranks the top 40 teams.

=== ACC Kickoff ===
The 2022 ACC Kickoff will be held on July 20 and 21 at the Westin hotel in Charlotte, North Carolina. Each team will have there head coach and three players available to talk to the media. Coverage of the event will be televised by the ACC Network. The preseason poll was released on July 26, 2022. The poll projected Clemson to win the conference title for the seventh time in the last eight years.

Atlantic
Predicted finish	Team	Votes (1st place)
1	Clemson	1,080 (111)
2	NC State	959 (44)
3	Wake Forest	783 (6)
4	Louisville	591
5	Florida State	509 (2)
6	Boston College	469 (1)
7	Syracuse	201

Coastal
Predicted finish	Team	Votes (1st place)
1	Miami (FL)	1,036 (98)
2	Pittsburgh	911 (38)
3	North Carolina	823 (18)
4	Virginia	667 (6)
5	Virginia Tech	592 (3)
6	Georgia Tech	343 (1)
7	Duke	220

Media poll (ACC Championship)
Rank	Team	Votes
1	Clemson	103
2	NC State	38
3	Miami (FL)	8
4	Wake Forest	4
5	Pittsburgh	3
5	Virginia	3
7	Florida State	2
7	North Carolina	2
9	Boston College	1

=== Preseason ACC Player of the year ===
Ranking	Player	Position	Team	Votes
1	Devin Leary	QB	NC State	40
2	Sam Hartman	QB	Wake Forest	30
3	Tyler Van Dyke	QB	Miami	21
4	Bryan Bresee	DT	Clemson	14
4	Brennan Armstrong	QB	Virginia	14
6	Malik Cunningham	QB	Louisville	12
6	Josh Downs	WR	North Carolina	12
8	Sean Tucker	RB	Syracuse	11
9	Myles Murphy	DT	Clemson	5
10	Trenton Simpson	LB	Clemson	3
11	Jammie Robinson	S	Florida State	2

=== Preseason all-conference teams ===
Position	Player	School	Votes
Quarterback	Devin Leary	NC State	56
Running back	Sean Tucker	Syracuse	125
Running back	Will Shipley	Clemson	112
Wide receiver	Josh Downs	North Carolina	128
Wide receiver	A. T. Perry	Wake Forest	111
Wide receiver	Zay Flowers	Boston College	104
Tight end	Will Mallory	Miami	69
All-Purpose	Keytaon Thompson	Virginia	70
Tackle	Jordan McFadden	Clemson	127
Tackle	Zion Nelson	Miami	82
Guard	Caleb Chandler	Louisville	104
Guard	Christian Mahogany	Boston College	67
Center	Grant Gibson	NC State	90

==== Defense ====
Position	Player	School	Votes
Defensive end	Myles Murphy	Clemson	120
Defensive end	Habakkuk Baldonado	Pittsburgh	54
Defensive tackle	Bryan Bresee	Clemson	116
Defensive tackle	Calijah Kancey	Pittsburgh	62
Linebacker	Drake Thomas	NC State	92
Linebacker	Trenton Simpson	Clemson	82
Linebacker	Payton Wilson	NC State	60
Cornerback	Kei'Trel Clark	Louisville	70
Cornerback	Josh DeBerry	Boston College	65
Safety	Jammie Robinson	Florida State	93
Safety	Tanner Ingle	NC State	63

==== Specialist ====
Position	Player	School	Votes
Placekicker	B. T. Potter	Clemson	99
Punter	Lou Hedley	Miami	101
Specialist	Josh Downs	North Carolina	57

=== Preseason awards ===
==== All−American Teams ====
	AP 1st Team	AP 2nd Team	AS 1st Team	AS 2nd Team	WCFF 1st Team	WCFF 2nd Team	ESPN	CBS 1st Team	CBS 2nd Team	CFN 1st Team	CFN 2nd Team	PFF 1st Team	PFF 2nd Team	SN 1st Team	SN 2nd Team
Christian Mahogany, OG, Boston College													✓		
Bryan Bresee, DL, Clemson	✓		✓		✓		✓	✓		✓		✓		✓	
Tyler Davis, DT, Clemson											✓				
Jordan McFadden, OL, Clemson				✓		✓							✓		
Andrew Mukuba, DB, Clemson													✓		
Myles Murphy, DL, Clemson		✓		✓			✓		✓		✓				✓
Trenton Simpson, LB, Clemson				✓			✓		✓				✓		✓
Jammie Robinson, S, Florida State		✓													
Caleb Chandler, OL, Louisville	✓			✓	✓								✓	✓	
Zion Nelson, OT, Miami											✓				
James Williams, S, Miami									✓						
Payton Wilson, LB, NC State										✓					
Josh Downs, WR, North Carolina		✓		✓					✓				✓		✓
Calijah Kancey, DL, Pittsburgh		✓	✓			✓			✓				✓		✓
Sean Tucker, RB, Syracuse		✓	✓			✓			✓		✓				✓
A. T. Perry, WR, Wake Forest		✓													

=== Preseason award watchlists ===
Award	Head Coach/Player	School	Position	Year	Ref
Lott Trophy	Bryan Bresee	Clemson	DT	Jr.	
Lott Trophy	Trenton Simpson	Clemson	LB	Jr.	
Lott Trophy	Shaka Heyward	Duke	LB	(redshirt) Sr.	
Lott Trophy	Akheem Mesidor	Miami (FL)	DL	Jr.	
Lott Trophy	Tony Grimes	North Carolina	CB	Jr.	
Lott Trophy	Calijah Kancey	Pittsburgh	DL	(redshirt) Jr.	
Lott Trophy	Nick Jackson	Virginia	LB	Sr.	
Lott Trophy	Nick Andersen	Wake Forest	S	Jr.	
Dodd Trophy	Dabo Swinney	Clemson	HC	—	
Dodd Trophy	Dave Doeren	NC State	HC	—	
Dodd Trophy	Pat Narduzzi	Pittsburgh	HC	—	
Dodd Trophy	Dave Clawson	Wake Forest	HC	—	
Maxwell Award	Phil Jurkovec	Boston College	QB	(redshirt) Sr.	
Maxwell Award	Will Shipley	Clemson	RB	So.	
Maxwell Award	Jordan Travis	Florida State	QB	Sr.	
Maxwell Award	Malik Cunningham	Louisville	QB	(redshirt) Sr.	
Maxwell Award	Tyler Van Dyke	Miami (FL)	QB	(redshirt) So.	
Maxwell Award	Devin Leary	NC State	QB	(redshirt) Jr.	
Maxwell Award	Josh Downs	North Carolina	WR	Jr.	
Maxwell Award	Sean Tucker	Syracuse	RB	So.	
Maxwell Award	Brennan Armstrong	Virginia	QB	(redshirt) Sr.	
Maxwell Award	Dontayvion Wicks	Virginia	WR	Jr.	
Maxwell Award	Sam Hartman	Wake Forest	QB	(redshirt) Sr.	
Maxwell Award	A. T. Perry	Wake Forest	WR	(redshirt) Jr.	
Davey O'Brien Award	Malik Cunningham	Louisville	QB	(redshirt) Sr.	
Davey O'Brien Award	Tyler Van Dyke	Miami (FL)	QB	(redshirt) So.	
Davey O'Brien Award	Devin Leary	NC State	QB	(redshirt) Jr.	
Davey O'Brien Award	Brennan Armstrong	Virginia	QB	(redshirt) Jr.	
Davey O'Brien Award	Sam Hartman	Wake Forest	QB	(redshirt) Jr.	
Doak Walker Award	Pat Garwo	Boston College	RB	Jr.	
Doak Walker Award	Will Shipley	Clemson	RB	So.	
Doak Walker Award	Treshaun Ward	Florida State	RB	So.	
Doak Walker Award	Hassan Hall	Georgia Tech	RB	Sr.	
Doak Walker Award	Dontae Smith	Georgia Tech	RB	Jr.	
Doak Walker Award	British Brooks	North Carolina	RB	Sr.	
Doak Walker Award	Sean Tucker	Syracuse	RB	So.	
Doak Walker Award	Justice Ellison	Wake Forest	RB	So.	
Biletnikoff Award	Josh Downs	North Carolina	WR	Jr.	
Biletnikoff Award	A. T. Perry	Wake Forest	WR	(redshirt) Jr.	
Biletnikoff Award	Keytaon Thompson	Virginia	WR	Sr.	
Biletnikoff Award	Dontayvion Wicks	Virginia	WR	Jr.	
John Mackey Award	George Takacs	Boston College	TE	(redshirt) Graduate	
John Mackey Award	Davis Allen	Clemson	TE	Sr.	
John Mackey Award	Camren McDonald	Florida State	TE	(redshirt) Sr.	
John Mackey Award	Marshon Ford	Louisville	TE	(redshirt) Jr.	
John Mackey Award	Will Mallory	Miami (FL)	TE	(redshirt) Graduate	
John Mackey Award	Gavin Bartholomew	Pittsburgh	TE	So.	
John Mackey Award	Blake Whiteheart	Wake Forest	TE	(redshirt) Jr.	
Rimington Trophy	Will Putnam	Clemson	OL	Sr.	
Rimington Trophy	Jakai Clark	Miami (FL)	OL	Jr.	
Rimington Trophy	Grant Gibson	NC State	OL	(redshirt) Graduate	
Rimington Trophy	Johnny Jordan	Virginia Tech	OL	(redshirt) Graduate	
Rimington Trophy	Michael Jurgens	Wake Forest	OL	Jr.	
Butkus Award	Trenton Simpson	Clemson	LB	Jr.	
Butkus Award	Tatum Bethune	Florida State	LB	(redshirt) Jr.	
Butkus Award	Isaiah Moore	NC State	LB	(redshirt) Graduate	
Butkus Award	Drake Thomas	NC State	LB	Jr.	
Butkus Award	Mikel Jones	Syracuse	LB	Jr.	
Butkus Award	Nick Jackson	Virginia	LB	Sr.	

Award	Head Coach/Player	School	Position	Year	Ref
Jim Thorpe Award	Andrew Mukuba	Clemson	DB	So.	
Jim Thorpe Award	Jammie Robinson	Florida State	DB	Jr.	
Jim Thorpe Award	Kei'Trel Clark	Louisville	DB	Jr.	
Jim Thorpe Award	Brandon Hill	Pittsburgh	DB	Jr.	
Bronko Nagurski Trophy	Bryan Bresee	Clemson	DT	Jr.	
Bronko Nagurski Trophy	Myles Murphy	Clemson	DE	Jr.	
Bronko Nagurski Trophy	Trenton Simpson	Clemson	LB	Jr.	
Bronko Nagurski Trophy	Jammie Robinson	Florida State	S		
Bronko Nagurski Trophy	Leonard Taylor	Miami (FL)	DT	So.	
Bronko Nagurski Trophy	Myles Murphy	North Carolina	DT	Jr.	
Bronko Nagurski Trophy	Tanner Ingle	NC State	S	Sr.	
Bronko Nagurski Trophy	Drake Thomas	NC State	LB	Jr.	
Bronko Nagurski Trophy	Calijah Kancey	Pittsburgh	DT	(redshirt) Jr.	
Bronko Nagurski Trophy	Mikel Jones	Syracuse	LB	Jr.	
Outland Trophy	Christian Mahogany	Boston College	G	(redshirt) Jr.	
Outland Trophy	Bryan Bresee	Clemson	DT	Jr.	
Outland Trophy	Tyler Davis	Clemson	DT	Sr.	
Outland Trophy	Jordan McFadden	Clemson	OT	(redshirt) Sr.	
Outland Trophy	Caleb Chandler	Louisville	G	(redshirt) Sr.	
Outland Trophy	Leonard Taylor	Miami (FL)	DT	So.	
Outland Trophy	Zion Nelson	Miami (FL)	OT	(redshirt) Jr.	
Outland Trophy	Myles Murphy	North Carolina	DT	Jr.	
Outland Trophy	Cory Durden	NC State	DT	(redshirt) Graduate	
Outland Trophy	Calijah Kancey	Pittsburgh	DT	(redshirt) Jr.	
Outland Trophy	Carter Warren	Pittsburgh	OT	(redshirt) Sr.	
Lou Groza Award	Connor Lytton	Boston College	PK	So.	
Lou Groza Award	B. T. Potter	Clemson	PK	(redshirt) Sr.	
Lou Groza Award	Andrés Borregales	Miami (FL)	PK	So.	
Lou Groza Award	Andre Szmyt	Syracuse	PK	(redshirt) Sr.	
Ray Guy Award	Porter Wilson	Duke	P	(redshirt) Jr.	
Ray Guy Award	Alex Mastromanno	Florida State	P	(redshirt) So.	
Ray Guy Award	Lou Hedley	Miami (FL)	P	(redshirt) Sr.	
Ray Guy Award	Ben Kiernan	North Carolina	P	Sr.	
Ray Guy Award	Ivan Mora	Wake Forest	P	(redshirt) So.	
Paul Hornung Award	Will Shipley	Clemson	RB	So.	
Paul Hornung Award	Jaylen Stinson	Duke	DB	Jr.	
Paul Hornung Award	Israel Abanikanda	Pittsburgh	RB	Jr.	
Paul Hornung Award	Taylor Morin	Wake Forest	WR	(redshirt) So.	
Wuerffel Trophy	Taji Johnson	Boston College	WR	Jr.	
Wuerffel Trophy	Will Shipley	Clemson	RB	So.	
Wuerffel Trophy	DeWayne Carter	Duke	DL	Jr.	
Wuerffel Trophy	Dillan Gibbons	Florida State	OL	Sr.	
Wuerffel Trophy	Myles Sims	Georgia Tech	DB	Jr.	
Wuerffel Trophy	Clay James	Miami (FL)	LS	Jr.	
Wuerffel Trophy	Christopher Toudle	NC State	TE	Jr.	
Wuerffel Trophy	Deslin Alexandre	Pittsburgh	DL	Sr.	
Wuerffel Trophy	Aaron Bolinksy	Syracuse	LS	Sr.	
Wuerffel Trophy	Chayce Chalmers	Virginia	DB	Jr.	
Wuerffel Trophy	Isaiah Chaney	Wake Forest	DL	So.	
Walter Camp Award	Phil Jurkovec	Boston College	QB	(redshirt) Sr.	
Walter Camp Award	Malik Cunningham	Louisville	QB	(redshirt) Sr.	
Walter Camp Award	Tyler Van Dyke	Miami (FL)	QB	(redshirt) So.	
Walter Camp Award	Josh Downs	North Carolina	WR	Jr.	
Walter Camp Award	Devin Leary	NC State	QB	(redshirt) Jr.	
Walter Camp Award	Calijah Kancey	Pittsburgh	DL	(redshirt) Jr.	
Walter Camp Award	Sean Tucker	Syracuse	RB	So.	
Walter Camp Award	Sam Hartman	Wake Forest	QB	(redshirt) Sr.	

Award	Head Coach/Player	School	Position	Year	Ref
Bednarik Award	Josh DeBerry	Boston College	DB	Sr.	
Bednarik Award	Bryan Bresee	Clemson	DT	So.	
Bednarik Award	Myles Murphy	Clemson	DE	Jr.	
Bednarik Award	Trenton Simpson	Clemson	LB	Jr.	
Bednarik Award	Shaka Heyward	Duke	LB	Sr.	
Bednarik Award	Jammie Robinson	Florida State	DB	Jr.	
Bednarik Award	Yasir Abdullah	Louisville	LB	Sr.	
Bednarik Award	James Williams	Miami (FL)	S	So.	
Bednarik Award	Myles Murphy	North Carolina	DT	Jr.	
Bednarik Award	Drake Thomas	NC State	LB	Jr.	
Bednarik Award	Payton Wilson	NC State	LB	Jr.	
Bednarik Award	Habakkuk Baldonado	Pittsburgh	DE	Sr.	
Bednarik Award	Calijah Kancey	Pittsburgh	DT	(redshirt) Jr.	
Bednarik Award	Mikel Jones	Syracuse	LB	Jr.	
Bednarik Award	Nick Jackson	Virginia	LB	Sr.	
Rotary Lombardi Award	Bryan Bresee	Clemson	DT	(redshirt) So.	
Rotary Lombardi Award	Jordan McFadden	Clemson	OT	(redshirt) Sr.	
Rotary Lombardi Award	Myles Murphy	Clemson	DE	Jr.	
Rotary Lombardi Award	Trenton Simpson	Clemson	LB	Jr.	
Rotary Lombardi Award	Caleb Chandler	Louisville	OG	(redshirt) Sr.	
Rotary Lombardi Award	Calijah Kancey	Pittsburgh	DT	(redshirt) Jr.	
Rotary Lombardi Award	SirVocea Dennis	Pittsburgh	LB	Sr.	
Rotary Lombardi Award	Cory Durden	NC State	DT	(redshirt) Sr.	
Patrick Mannelly Award	Evan Deckers	Duke	LS	(redshirt) Graduate	
Patrick Mannelly Award	Drew Little	North Carolina	LS	Sr.	
Patrick Mannelly Award	Joe Shimko	NC State	LS	Jr.	
Earl Campbell Tyler Rose Award	Jaden Williams	Boston College	WR	So.	
Polynesian College Football Player Of The Year Award	DJ Uiagalelei	Clemson	QB	Jr.	
Polynesian College Football Player Of The Year Award	Lawrance Toafili	Florida State	RB	(redshirt) So.	
Polynesian College Football Player Of The Year Award	Jermayne Lole	Louisville	DL	Sr.	
Polynesian College Football Player Of The Year Award	Logan Sagapolu	Miami	DL	(redshirt) Fr.	
Polynesian College Football Player Of The Year Award	Aaron Faumui	Virginia	DL	Sr.	
Polynesian College Football Player Of The Year Award	Josh Fuga	Virginia Tech	DL	(redshirt) Jr.	
Manning Award	Malik Cunningham	Louisville	QB	(redshirt) Sr.	
Manning Award	Tyler Van Dyke	Miami (FL)	QB	(redshirt) So.	
Manning Award	Devin Leary	NC State	QB	(redshirt) Jr.	
Manning Award	Brennan Armstrong	Virginia	QB	(redshirt) Sr.	
Manning Award	Sam Hartman	Wake Forest	QB	(redshirt) Sr.	
Johnny Unitas Golden Arm Award	Phil Jurkovec	Boston College	QB	(redshirt) Sr.	
Johnny Unitas Golden Arm Award	DJ Uiagalelei	Clemson	QB	Jr.	
Johnny Unitas Golden Arm Award	Jordan Travis	Florida State	QB	Sr.	
Johnny Unitas Golden Arm Award	Jeff Sims	Georgia Tech	QB	So.	
Johnny Unitas Golden Arm Award	Malik Cunningham	Louisville	QB	(redshirt) Sr.	
Johnny Unitas Golden Arm Award	Tyler Van Dyke	Miami (FL)	QB	(redshirt) So.	
Johnny Unitas Golden Arm Award	Devin Leary	NC State	QB	(redshirt) Jr.	
Johnny Unitas Golden Arm Award	Kedon Slovis	Pittsburgh	QB	Sr.	
Johnny Unitas Golden Arm Award	Garrett Shrader	Syracuse	QB	Jr.	
Johnny Unitas Golden Arm Award	Brennan Armstrong	Virginia	QB	(redshirt) Sr.	
Johnny Unitas Golden Arm Award	Grant Wells	Virginia Tech	QB	(redshirt) Jr.	
Johnny Unitas Golden Arm Award	Sam Hartman	Wake Forest	QB	(redshirt) Sr.	

== Coaches ==
=== Coaching changes ===
The ACC entered the 2022 season with four new head football coaches:

- On November 16, 2021, Virginia Tech head coach Justin Fuente agreed to part ways with the program and was replaced by Brent Pry on November 30, 2021.
- On November 28, 2021, Duke head coach David Cutcliffe agreed to part ways with the program and was replaced by Mike Elko on December 10, 2021.
- On December 2, 2021, Virginia head coach Bronco Mendenhall stepped down as head coach and was replaced by Tony Elliott on December 10, 2021.
- On December 6, 2021, Miami head coach Manny Diaz was fired and was replaced by Mario Cristobal on December 7, 2021.

=== Head coaching records ===
Team	Head coach	Years at school	Overall record	Record at school	ACC record
Boston College	Jeff Hafley	3	12–11	12–11	7–11
Clemson	Dabo Swinney	14	132–35	132–35	74–17
Duke	Mike Elko	1	0–0	0–0	0–0
Florida State	Mike Norvell	3	46–28	8–13	6–10
Georgia Tech	Geoff Collins	4	24–35	9–25	7–18
Louisville	Scott Satterfield	4	69–43	18–19	12–13
Miami	Mario Cristobal	1	62–60	0–0	0–0
North Carolina	Mack Brown	14	265–139–1	90–63–1	55–47–1
NC State	Dave Doeren	10	87–53	64–49	34–40
Pittsburgh	Pat Narduzzi	8	52–37	52–37	36–22
Syracuse	Dino Babers	7	66–59	29–43	15–35
Virginia	Tony Elliot	1	0–0	0–0	0–0
Virginia Tech	Brent Pry	1	0–0	0–0	0–0
Wake Forest	Dave Clawson	9	141–127	51–48	26–37

Notes

- Records shown after the 2021 season
- Years at school includes the 2022 season

== Rankings ==
Legend
	Improvement in ranking
	Drop in ranking
	Not ranked previous week
RV	Received votes but were not ranked in Top 25 of poll

		Pre	Wk 1	Wk 2	Wk 3	Wk 4	Wk 5	Wk 6	Wk 7	Wk 8	Wk 9	Wk 10	Wk 11	Wk 12	Wk 13	Wk 14	Final
Boston College	AP																
Boston College	C																
Boston College	CFP	Not released															
Clemson	AP	4	5	5	5	5	5	4	5	5 (1)	5	12	9	7	10	10	13
Clemson	C	4	4	4	5	5	5	5	5	5	5	12	9	8	11	11	12
Clemson	CFP	Not released									4	10	9	8	9	7	
Duke	AP												RV				RV
Duke	C				RV		RV						RV		RV	RV	RV
Duke	CFP	Not released															
Florida State	AP		RV	RV	RV	23	RV	RV	RV	RV	RV	25	20	16	14	13	11
Florida State	C	RV	RV	RV	RV	22	RV	RV				RV	20	16	14	13	10
Florida State	CFP	Not released										23	19	16	13	13	
Georgia Tech	AP																
Georgia Tech	C													RV			
Georgia Tech	CFP	Not released															
Louisville	AP										RV	RV		RV			RV
Louisville	C	RV									RV	RV		RV			RV
Louisville	CFP	Not released												25			
Miami	AP	16	15	13	25												
Miami	C	17	16	13	25												
Miami	CFP	Not released															
North Carolina	AP	RV	RV	RV	RV		RV	RV	22	21	17	15	13	18	24	RV	RV
North Carolina	C	RV	RV	RV	RV		RV	25	22	21	15	14	11	17	22	25	RV
North Carolina	CFP	Not released									17	15	13	17	23		
NC State	AP	13	18	16	12	10	14	15	23	24	21	17	RV		RV	25	RV
NC State	C	13	13	12	11	10	14	13	23	23	20	16	25		RV	RV	
NC State	CFP	Not released									22	14	24		25	23	
Pittsburgh	AP	17	16	23	24	24									RV	RV	22
Pittsburgh	C	16	14	25	RV	24	RV	RV	RV			RV	RV	RV	RV	RV	22
Pittsburgh	CFP	Not released															
Syracuse	AP				RV	RV	22	18	14	16	22						
Syracuse	C		RV	RV	RV	25	21	18	14	16	22	RV					
Syracuse	CFP	Not released									20						
Virginia	AP																
Virginia	C																
Virginia	CFP	Not released															
Virginia Tech	AP																
Virginia Tech	C																
Virginia Tech	CFP	Not released															
Wake Forest	AP	22	23	19	21	22	15	14	13	10	20	RV					
Wake Forest	C	19	21	18	16	21	15	14	13	10	19	RV	RV	RV	RV		RV
Wake Forest	CFP	Not released									21						

== Schedule ==
The regular season began on Saturday August 27, 2022, and will end on Saturday November 26, 2022. The ACC Championship Game will be played on Saturday December 3, 2022, at Bank of America Stadium in Charlotte, North Carolina.

=== Regular season ===
==== Week zero ====
Date	Time	Visiting team	Home team	Site	TV	Result	Attendance	Ref.
August 27	5:00 p.m.	Duquesne	Florida State	Doak Campbell Stadium • Tallahassee, FL	ACCN	W 47–7	51,207	
August 27	8:15 p.m.	Florida A&M	North Carolina	Kenan Stadium • Chapel Hill, NC	ACCN	W 56–24	46,130	
^{#}Rankings from AP Poll released prior to game. All times are in Eastern Time.

==== Week one ====
Date	Time	Visiting team	Home team	Site	TV	Result	Attendance	Ref.
September 1	7:00 p.m.	West Virginia	No. 17 Pittsburgh	Acrisure Stadium • Pittsburgh, PA (Backyard Brawl, College GameDay)	ESPN	W 38–31	70,622	
September 1	7:30 p.m.	VMI	No. 22 Wake Forest	Truist Field at Wake Forest • Winston-Salem, NC	ACCN	W 44–10	26,013	
September 2	7:00 p.m.	Virginia Tech	Old Dominion	S.B. Ballard Stadium • Norfolk, VA	ESPNU	L 17–20	21,944	
September 2	7:30 p.m.	Temple	Duke	Wallace Wade Stadium • Durham, NC	ACCN	W 30–0	20,722	
September 3	Noon	Rutgers	Boston College	Alumni Stadium • Chestnut Hill, MA	ACCN	L 21–22	35,048	
September 3	Noon	North Carolina	Appalachian State	Kidd Brewer Stadium • Boone, NC	ESPNU	W 63–61	40,168	
September 3	Noon	No. 13 NC State	East Carolina	Dowdy–Ficklen Stadium • Greenville, NC (rivalry)	ESPN	W 21–20	51,711	
September 3	12:30 p.m.	No. 24 (FCS) Richmond	Virginia	Scott Stadium • Charlottesville, VA	ACCRSN	W 34–17	41,122	
September 3	3:30 p.m.	Bethune–Cookman	No. 16 Miami	Hard Rock Stadium • Miami Gardens, FL	ACCN	W 70–13	56,795	
September 3	8:00 p.m.	Louisville	Syracuse	JMA Wireless Dome • Syracuse, NY	ACCN	CUSE 31–7	37,110	
September 4	7:30 p.m.	Florida State	LSU	Caesars Superdome • New Orleans, LA (Louisiana Kickoff)	ABC	W 24–23	68,388	
September 5	8:00 p.m.	No. 4 Clemson	Georgia Tech	Mercedes-Benz Stadium • Atlanta, GA (Chick-fil-A Kickoff/rivalry)	ESPN	CLEM 41–10	45,000	
^{#}Rankings from AP Poll released prior to game. All times are in Eastern Time.

==== Week two ====
Date	Time	Visiting team	Home team	Site	TV	Result	Attendance	Ref.
September 9	7:30 p.m.	Louisville	UCF	FBC Mortgage Stadium • Orlando, FL	ESPN2	W 20–14	44,412	
September 10	Noon	Duke	Northwestern	Ryan Field • Evanston, IL	FS1	W 31–23	24,622	
September 10	Noon	Southern Miss	No. 15 Miami	Hard Rock Stadium • Miami Gardens, FL	ACCN	W 30–7	46,422	
September 10	Noon	North Carolina	Georgia State	Center Parc Stadium • Atlanta, GA	ESPNU	W 35–28	17,687	
September 10	Noon	No. 23 Wake Forest	Vanderbilt	Vanderbilt Stadium • Nashville, TN	SECN	W 45–25	24,431	
September 10	12:30 p.m.	Charleston Southern	No. 18 NC State	Carter–Finley Stadium • Raleigh, NC	ACCRSN	W 55–3	54,169	
September 10	3:30 p.m.	Furman	No. 5 Clemson	Memorial Stadium • Clemson, SC	ACCN	W 35–12	78,302	
September 10	3:30 p.m.	No. 24 Tennessee	No. 17 Pittsburgh	Acrisure Stadium • Pittsburgh, PA	ABC	L 27–34 ^{OT}	59,785	
September 10	4:00 p.m.	Virginia	Illinois	Memorial Stadium • Champaign, IL	ESPNU	L 3–24	33,669	
September 10	7:00 p.m.	Western Carolina	Georgia Tech	Bobby Dodd Stadium • Atlanta, GA	ACCNX/ESPN+	W 35–17	36,486	
September 10	7:00 p.m.	Syracuse	UConn	Rentschler Field • East Hartford, CT	CBSSN	W 48–14	25,114	
September 10	8:00 p.m.	Boston College	Virginia Tech	Lane Stadium • Blacksburg, VA (rilvalry)	ACCN	VT 27–10	65,632	
^{#}Rankings from AP Poll released prior to game. All times are in Eastern Time.

Date	Bye Week
September 10	Florida State

==== Week three ====
Date	Time	Visiting team	Home team	Site	TV	Result	Attendance	Ref.
September 16	7:30 p.m.	Florida State	Louisville	Cardinal Stadium • Louisville, KY	ESPN	FSU 35–31	46,459	
September 17	11:00 a.m.	Wofford	Virginia Tech	Lane Stadium • Blacksburg, VA	ACCN	W 27–7	62,043	
September 17	Noon	Purdue	Syracuse	JMA Wireless Dome • Syracuse, NY	ESPN2	W 32–29	35,943	
September 17	2:00 p.m.	Old Dominion	Virginia	Scott Stadium • Charlottesville, VA	ACCN	W 16–14	40,556	
September 17	3:30 p.m.	No. 20 Ole Miss	Georgia Tech	Bobby Dodd Stadium • Atlanta, GA	ABC	L 0–42	40,293	
September 17	5:00 p.m.	Liberty	No. 19 Wake Forest	Truist Field at Wake Forest • Winston-Salem, NC	ACCN	W 37–36	32,891	
September 17	6:00 p.m.	North Carolina A&T	Duke	Wallace Wade Stadium • Durham, NC	ACCNX/ESPN+	W 49–20	32,802	
September 17	7:00 p.m.	Texas Tech	No. 16 NC State	Carter–Finley Stadium • Raleigh, NC	ESPN2	W 27–14	56,919	
September 17	7:30 p.m.	No. 23 Pittsburgh	Western Michigan	Waldo Stadium • Kalamazoo, MI	ESPNU	W 34–13	22,875	
September 17	7:30 p.m.	Maine	Boston College	Alumni Stadium • Chestnut Hill, MA	ACCRSN	W 38–17	34,325	
September 17	8:00 p.m.	Louisiana Tech	No. 5 Clemson	Memorial Stadium • Clemson, SC	ACCN	W 48–20	80,542	
September 17	9:00 p.m.	No. 13 Miami	No. 24 Texas A&M	Kyle Field • College Station, TX	ESPN	L 9–17	107,245	
^{#}Rankings from AP Poll released prior to game. All times are in Eastern Time.

Date	Bye Week
September 17	North Carolina

==== Week four ====
Date	Time	Visiting team	Home team	Site	TV	Result	Attendance	Ref.
September 22	7:30 p.m.	West Virginia	Virginia Tech	Lane Stadium • Blacksburg, VA (rivalry)	ESPN	L 10–33	65,632	
September 23	7:00 p.m.	Virginia	Syracuse	JMA Wireless Dome • Syracuse, NY	ESPN	CUSE 22–20	34,590	
September 24	Noon	No. 5 Clemson	No. 21 Wake Forest	Truist Field at Wake Forest • Winston-Salem, NC	ABC	CLEM 51–45 ^{2OT}	32,903	
September 24	Noon	Duke	Kansas	David Booth Kansas Memorial Stadium • Lawrence, KS	FS1	L 27–35	47,233	
September 24	Noon	South Florida	Louisville	Cardinal Stadium • Louisville, KY	ACCRSN	W 3–41	41,217	
September 24	Noon	No. 20 (FCS) Rhode Island	No. 24 Pittsburgh	Acrisure Stadium • Pittsburgh, PA	ACCN	W 24–45	54,667	
September 24	3:30 p.m.	Middle Tennessee	No. 25 Miami	Hard Rock Stadium • Miami Gardens, FL	ACCN	L 31–45	46,713	
September 24	3:30 p.m.	Notre Dame	North Carolina	Kenan Stadium • Chapel Hill, NC	ABC	L 32–45	50,500	
September 24	4:00 p.m.	Georgia Tech	UCF	FBC Mortgage Stadium • Orlando, FL	ESPNU	L 10–27	44,220	
September 24	7:30 p.m.	UConn	No. 12 NC State	Carter–Finley Stadium • Raleigh, NC	ACCRSN	W 41–10	56,919	
September 24	8:00 p.m.	Boston College	Florida State	Doak Campbell Stadium • Tallahassee, FL	ACCN	FSU 44–14	79,560	
^{#}Rankings from AP Poll released prior to game. All times are in Eastern Time.

==== Week five ====
Date	Time	Visiting team	Home team	Site	TV	Result	Attendance	Ref.
October 1	Noon	Louisville	Boston College	Alumni Stadium • Chestnut Hill, MA	ACCN	BC 34–33	38,517	
October 1	3:30 p.m.	No. 22 Wake Forest	No. 23 Florida State	Doak Campbell Stadium • Tallahassee, FL	ABC	WAKE 31–21	69,749	
October 1	3:30 p.m.	Virginia Tech	North Carolina	Kenan Stadium • Chapel Hill, NC	ACCN	UNC 41–10	45,029	
October 1	5:00 p.m.	Wagner	Syracuse	JMA Wireless Dome • Syracuse, NY	ACCNX/ESPN+	W 59–0	33,373	
October 1	7:30 p.m.	No. 10 NC State	No. 5 Clemson	Memorial Stadium • Clemson, SC (Textile Bowl, College GameDay)	ABC	CLEM 30–20	81,500	
October 1	7:30 p.m.	Virginia	Duke	Wallace Wade Stadium • Durham, NC	ACCRSN	DUKE 38–17	15,152	
October 1	8:00 p.m.	Georgia Tech	No. 24 Pittsburgh	Acrisure Stadium • Pittsburgh, PA	ACCN	GT 26–21	46,972	
^{#}Rankings from AP Poll released prior to game. All times are in Eastern Time.

Date	Bye Week
October 1	Miami

==== Week six ====
Date	Time	Visiting team	Home team	Site	TV	Result	Attendance	Ref.
October 8	Noon	Louisville	Virginia	Scott Stadium • Charlottesville, VA	ACCN	LOU 34–17	38,009	
October 8	3:30 p.m.	Virginia Tech	Pittsburgh	Acrisure Stadium • Pittsburgh, PA	ACCN	PITT 45–29	54,677	
October 8	4:00 p.m.	Duke	Georgia Tech	Bobby Dodd Stadium • Atlanta, GA	ACCRSN	GT 23–20 ^{OT}	32,041	
October 8	4:00 p.m.	North Carolina	Miami	Hard Rock Stadium • Miami Gardens, FL	ESPN2	UNC 27–24	53,751	
October 8	7:30 p.m.	Army	No. 15 Wake Forest	Truist Field at Wake Forest • Winston-Salem, NC	ACCRSN	W 45–10	32,524	
October 8	7:30 p.m.	No. 5 Clemson	Boston College	Alumni Stadium • Chestnut Hill, MA (O'Rourke–McFadden Trophy)	ABC	CLEM 31–3	42,138	
October 8	8:00 p.m.	Florida State	No. 14 NC State	Carter–Finley Stadium • Raleigh, NC	ACCN	NCSU 19–17	56,919	
^{#}Rankings from AP Poll released prior to game. All times are in Eastern Time.

Date	Bye Week
October 8	No. 22 Syracuse

==== Week seven ====
Date	Time	Visiting team	Home team	Site	TV	Result	Attendance	Ref.
October 15	12:30 p.m.	Miami	Virginia Tech	Lane Stadium • Blacksburg, VA (rivalry)	ACCRSN	MIA 20–14	65,632	
October 15	3:30 p.m.	No. 15 NC State	No. 18 Syracuse	JMA Wireless Dome • Syracuse, NY	ACCN	CUSE 24–9	49,705	
October 15	7:30 p.m.	No. 4 Clemson	Florida State	Doak Campbell Stadium • Tallahassee, FL (rivalry)	ABC	CLEM 34–28	71,098	
October 15	8:00 p.m.	North Carolina	Duke	Wallace Wade Stadium • Durham, NC (Victory Bell)	ACCN	UNC 38–35	40,004	
^{#}Rankings from AP Poll released prior to game. All times are in Eastern Time.

Date	Bye Week					
October 15	Boston College	Georgia Tech	Louisville	Pittsburgh	Virginia	No. 14 Wake Forest

==== Week eight ====
Date	Time	Visiting team	Home team	Site	TV	Result	Attendance	Ref.
October 20	7:30 p.m.	Virginia	Georgia Tech	Bobby Dodd Stadium • Atlanta, GA	ESPN	UVA 16–9	29,362	
October 22	Noon	No. 14 Syracuse	No. 5 Clemson	Memorial Stadium • Clemson, SC	ABC	CLEM 27–21	81,500	
October 22	12:30 p.m.	Duke	Miami	Hard Rock Stadium • Miami Gardens, FL	ACCRSN	DUKE 45–21	57,421	
October 22	3:30 p.m.	Boston College	No. 13 Wake Forest	Truist Field at Wake Forest • Winston-Salem, NC	ACCN	WAKE 43–15	28,530	
October 22	8:00 p.m.	Pittsburgh	Louisville	Cardinal Stadium • Louisville, KY	ACCN	LOU 24–10	41,840	
^{#}Rankings from AP Poll released prior to game. All times are in Eastern Time.

Date	Bye Week			
October 22	Florida State	No. 22 North Carolina	No. 23 NC State	Virginia Tech

==== Week nine ====
Date	Time	Visiting team	Home team	Site	TV	Result	Attendance	Ref.
October 27	7:30 p.m.	Virginia Tech	No. 24 NC State	Carter–Finley Stadium • Raleigh, NC	ESPN	NCSU 22–21	56,919	
October 29	Noon	Boston College	UConn	Rentschler Field • East Hartford, CT	CBSSN	L 3–13	25,527	
October 29	Noon	Georgia Tech	Florida State	Doak Campbell Stadium • Tallahassee, FL	ACCN	FSU 41–16	61,007	
October 29	Noon	Notre Dame	No. 16 Syracuse	JMA Wireless Dome • Syracuse, NY	ABC	L 24–42	49,861	
October 29	12:30 p.m.	Miami	Virginia	Scott Stadium • Charlottesville, VA	ACCRSN	MIA 14–12 ^{4OT}	43,714	
October 29	3:30 p.m.	No. 10 Wake Forest	Louisville	Cardinal Stadium • Louisville, KY	ACCN	LOU 48–21	39,503	
October 29	8:00 p.m.	Pittsburgh	No. 21 North Carolina	Kenan Stadium • Chapel Hill, NC	ACCN	UNC 42–24	50,500	
^{#}Rankings from AP Poll released prior to game. All times are in Eastern Time.

Date	Bye Week	
October 29	No. 5 Clemson	Duke

==== Week ten ====
Date	Time	Visiting team	Home team	Site	TV	Result	Attendance	Ref.
November 4	7:00 p.m.	Duke	Boston College	Alumni Stadium • Chestnut Hill, MA	ESPN2	DUKE 38–31	34,092	
November 5	Noon	No. 17 North Carolina	Virginia	Scott Stadium • Charlottesville, VA (South's Oldest Rivalry)	ACCN	UNC 31–28	44,156	
November 5	12:30 p.m.	Georgia Tech	Virginia Tech	Lane Stadium • Blacksburg, VA (rivalry)	ACCRSN	GT 28–27	62,843	
November 5	3:30 p.m.	No. 20 Syracuse	Pittsburgh	Acrisure Stadium • Pittsburgh, PA (rivalry)	ACCN	PITT 19–9	50,888	
November 5	7:30 p.m.	No. 4 Clemson	Notre Dame	Notre Dame Stadium • South Bend, IN	NBC	L 14–35	77,622	
November 5	7:30 p.m.	Florida State	Miami	Hard Rock Stadium • Miami Gardens, FL (rivalry)	ABC	FSU 45–3	66,200	
November 5	7:30 p.m.	James Madison	Louisville	Cardinal Stadium • Louisville, KY	ESPNU	W 34–10	42,157	
November 5	8:00 p.m.	No. 22 Wake Forest	No. 21 NC State	Carter–Finley Stadium • Raleigh, NC (rivalry)	ACCN	NCSU 30–21	56,919	
^{#}Rankings from College Football Playoff. All times are in Eastern Time.

==== Week eleven ====
Date	Time	Visiting team	Home team	Site	TV	Result	Attendance	Ref.
November 12	Noon	Virginia Tech	Duke	Wallace Wade Stadium • Durham, NC	ACCRSN	DUKE 24–7	20,857	
November 12	Noon	Pittsburgh	Virginia	Scott Stadium • Charlottesville, VA	ACCN	PITT 37–7	36,529	
November 12	3:30 p.m.	Boston College	No. 16 NC State	Carter–Finley Stadium • Raleigh, NC	ACCN	BC 21–20	56,919	
November 12	3:30 p.m.	Louisville	No. 10 Clemson	Memorial Stadium • Clemson, SC	ESPN	CLEM 31–16	80,176	
November 12	3:30 p.m.	Miami	Georgia Tech	Bobby Dodd Stadium • Atlanta, GA	ACCRSN	MIA 35–14	33,857	
November 12	7:30 p.m.	No. 15 North Carolina	Wake Forest	Truist Field at Wake Forest • Winston-Salem, NC (rivalry)	ESPN2	UNC 36–34	31,346	
November 12	8:00 p.m.	No. 23 Florida State	Syracuse	JMA Wireless Dome • Syracuse, NY	ACCN	FSU 38–3	45,213	
^{#}Rankings from College Football Playoff. All times are in Eastern Time.

==== Week twelve ====
Date	Time	Visiting team	Home team	Site	TV	Result	Attendance	Ref.
November 19	Noon	Duke	Pittsburgh	Acrisure Stadium • Pittsburgh, PA	ACCN	PITT 28–26	45,362	
November 19	Noon	Louisiana	No. 19 Florida State	Doak Campbell Stadium • Tallahassee, FL	ACCRSN	W 49–17	58,597	
November 19	Noon	Virginia Tech	Liberty	Williams Stadium • Lynchburg, VA	ESPN+	W 23–22	23,055	
November 19	2:30 p.m.	Boston College	No. 18 Notre Dame	Notre Dame Stadium • South Bend, IN (Holy War)	NBC	L 0–44	73,503	
November 19	3:30 p.m.	Miami	No. 9 Clemson	Memorial Stadium • Clemson, SC	ESPN	CLEM 40–10	81,340	
November 19	3:30 p.m.	No. 24 NC State	Louisville	Cardinal Stadium • Louisville, KY	ACCRSN	LOU 25–10	38,974	
November 19	5:30 p.m.	Georgia Tech	No. 13 North Carolina	Kenan Stadium • Chapel Hill, NC	ESPN2	GT 21–17	44,940	
November 19	8:00 p.m.	Syracuse	Wake Forest	Truist Field at Wake Forest • Winston-Salem, NC	ACCN	WAKE 45–35	26,164	
~~November 19~~	~~3:30 p.m.~~	~~Coastal Carolina~~	~~Virginia~~	~~Scott Stadium~~ • ~~Charlottesville, VA~~	~~ACCRSN~~	Canceled (Note: This game has been cancelled after the 2022 University of Virginia shooting.)		
^{#}Rankings from College Football Playoff. All times are in Eastern Time.

==== Week thirteen ====
Date	Time	Visiting team	Home team	Site	TV	Result	Attendance	Ref.
November 25	3:30 p.m.	NC State	No. 17 North Carolina	Kenan Stadium • Chapel Hill, NC (rivalry)	ABC	NCSU 30–27 ^{2OT}	50,500	
November 25	7:30 p.m.	Florida	No. 16 Florida State	Doak Campbell Stadium • Tallahassee, FL (rivalry)	ABC	W 45–38	79,560	
November 26	Noon	South Carolina	No. 8 Clemson	Memorial Stadium • Clemson, SC (rivalry)	ABC	L 30–31	81,500	
November 26	Noon	Georgia Tech	No. 1 Georgia	Sanford Stadium • Athens, GA (Clean, Old-Fashioned Hate)	ESPN	L 14–37	92,746	
November 26	3:00 p.m.	No. 25 Louisville	Kentucky	Kroger Field • Lexington, KY (Governor's Cup)	SECN	L 13–26	58,727	
November 26	3:30 p.m.	Wake Forest	Duke	Wallace Wade Stadium • Durham, NC	ACCN	DUKE 34–31	17,492	
November 26	7:30 p.m.	Syracuse	Boston College	Alumni Stadium • Chestnut Hill, MA (rivalry)	ACCRSN	CUSE 32–23	30,113	
November 26	8:00 p.m.	Pittsburgh	Miami	Hard Rock Stadium • Miami Gardens, FL	ACCN	PITT 42–16	46,428	
~~November 26~~		~~Virginia~~	~~Virginia Tech~~	~~Lane Stadium~~ • ~~Blacksburg, VA~~ (~~Commonwealth Cup~~)		Canceled (Note: This game has been cancelled after the 2022 University of Virginia shooting.)		
^{#}Rankings from College Football Playoff. All times are in Eastern Time.

==== Championship Game ====
Date	Time	Visiting team	Home team	Site	TV	Result	Attendance	Ref.
December 3	8:00 p.m.	No. 9 Clemson	No. 23 North Carolina	Bank of America Stadium • Charlotte, North Carolina	ABC	CLEM 39–10	64,155	
^{#}Rankings from College Football Playoff. All times are in Eastern Time.

== ACC vs other conferences ==
=== ACC vs Power Five matchups ===
The following games include ACC teams competing against Power Five conferences teams from the Big Ten, Big 12, BYU/Notre Dame, Pac-12 and SEC). All rankings are from the AP Poll at the time of the game.

Date	Conference	Visitor	Home	Site	Score
September 1	Big 12	West Virginia	No. 17 Pittsburgh	Acrisure Stadium • Pittsburgh, PA (Backyard Brawl)	W 38–31
September 3	Big Ten	Rutgers	Boston College	Alumni Stadium • Chestnut Hill, MA	L 21–22
September 4	SEC	Florida State	LSU	Caesars Superdome • New Orleans, LA (Louisiana Kickoff)	W 24–23
September 10	Big Ten	Duke	Northwestern	Ryan Field • Evanston, IL	W 31–23
September 10	SEC	No. 24 Tennessee	No. 17 Pittsburgh	Acrisure Stadium • Pittsburgh, PA	L 27–34^{OT}
September 10	Big Ten	Virginia	Illinois	Memorial Stadium • Champaign, IL	L 3–24
September 10	SEC	No. 23 Wake Forest	Vanderbilt	Vanderbilt Stadium • Nashville, TN	W 45–25
September 17	SEC	No. 20 Ole Miss	Georgia Tech	Bobby Dodd Stadium • Atlanta, GA	L 0–42
September 17	SEC	No. 13 Miami	No. 24 Texas A&M	Kyle Field • College Station, TX	L 9–17
September 17	Big 12	Texas Tech	No. 16 NC State	Carter–Finley Stadium • Raleigh, NC	W 27–14
September 17	Big Ten	Purdue	Syracuse	JMA Wireless Dome • Syracuse, NY	W 32–29
September 22	Big 12	West Virginia	Virginia Tech	Lane Stadium • Blacksburg, VA (rivalry)	L 10–33
September 24	Independent	Notre Dame	North Carolina	Kenan Stadium • Chapel Hill, NC	L 32–45
September 24	Big 12	Duke	Kansas	David Booth Kansas Memorial Stadium • Lawrence, KS	L 27–35
October 29	Independent	Notre Dame	No. 16 Syracuse	JMA Wireless Dome • Syracuse, NY	L 24–41
November 5	Independent	No. 5 Clemson	Notre Dame	Notre Dame Stadium • South Bend, IN	L 14–35
November 19	Independent	Boston College	No. 18 Notre Dame	Notre Dame Stadium • South Bend, IN (Holy War)	L 0–44
November 25	SEC	No. 16 Florida State	Florida	Doak Campbell Stadium • Tallahassee, FL (rivalry)	W 45–38
November 26	SEC	South Carolina	No. 8 Clemson	Memorial Stadium • Clemson, SC (rivalry)	L 30–31
November 26	SEC	Georgia Tech	No. 1 Georgia	Sanford Stadium • Athens, GA (Clean, Old-Fashioned Hate)	L 14–37
November 26	SEC	Louisville	Kentucky	Kroger Field • Lexington, KY (Governor's Cup)	L 13–26

=== ACC vs Group of Five matchups ===
The following games include ACC teams competing against teams from the American, C-USA, MAC, Mountain West or Sun Belt.

Date	Conference	Visitor	Home	Site	Score
September 2	American	Temple	Duke	Wallace Wade Stadium • Durham, NC	W 30–0
September 2	Sun Belt	Virginia Tech	Old Dominion	S.B. Ballard Stadium • Norfolk, VA	L 17–20
September 3	Sun Belt	North Carolina	Appalachian State	Kidd Brewer Stadium • Boone, NC	W 63–61
September 3	American	No. 13 NC State	East Carolina	Dowdy–Ficklen Stadium • Greenville, NC (rivalry)	W 21–20
September 10	American	Louisville	UCF	FBC Mortgage Stadium • Orlando, FL	W 20–14
September 10	Sun Belt	Southern Miss	No. 15 Miami	Hard Rock Stadium • Miami Gardens, FL	W 30–7
September 10	Sun Belt	North Carolina	Georgia State	Center Parc Stadium • Atlanta, GA	W 35–28
September 17	C-USA	Louisiana Tech	No. 5 Clemson	Memorial Stadium • Clemson, SC	W 48–20
September 17	MAC	No. 23 Pittsburgh	Western Michigan	Waldo Stadium • Kalamazoo, MI	W 34–13
September 17	Sun Belt	Old Dominion	Virginia	Scott Stadium • Charlottesville, VA	W 16–14
September 24	American	Georgia Tech	UCF	FBC Mortgage Stadium • Orlando, FL	L 10–27
September 24	American	South Florida	Louisville	Cardinal Stadium • Louisville, KY	W 41–3
September 24	C-USA	Middle Tennessee	No. 25 Miami	Hard Rock Stadium • Miami Gardens, FL	L 31–45
November 5	Sun Belt	James Madison	Louisville	Cardinal Stadium • Louisville, KY	W 34–10
November 19	Sun Belt	Louisiana	No. 20 Florida State	Doak Campbell Stadium • Tallahassee, FL	W 49–17
November 19	Sun Belt	Coastal Carolina	Virginia	Scott Stadium • Charlottesville, VA	Cancelled

=== ACC vs FBS independents matchups ===
The following games include ACC teams competing against FBS Independents, which includes Army, Liberty, New Mexico State, UConn or UMass.

Date	Visitor	Home	Site	Score
September 10	Syracuse	UConn	Rentschler Field • East Hartford, CT	W 48–14
September 17	Liberty	No. 19 Wake Forest	Truist Field at Wake Forest • Winston-Salem, NC	W 37–36
September 24	UConn	No. 12 NC State	Carter–Finley Stadium • Raleigh, NC	W 41–10
October 8	Army	No. 15 Wake Forest	Truist Field at Wake Forest • Winston-Salem, NC	W 45–10
October 29	Boston College	UConn	Rentschler Field • East Hartford, CT	L 3–13
November 19	Virginia Tech	Liberty	Williams Stadium • Lynchburg, VA	W 23–22

=== ACC vs FCS matchups ===
The Football Championship Subdivision comprises 13 conferences and two independent programs.

Date	Visitor	Home	Site	Score
August 27	Duquesne	Florida State	Doak Campbell Stadium • Tallahassee, FL	W 47–7
August 27	Florida A&M	North Carolina	Kenan Stadium • Chapel Hill, NC	W 56–24
September 1	VMI	No. 22 Wake Forest	Truist Field at Wake Forest • Winston-Salem, NC	W 44–10
September 3	Bethune–Cookman	No. 16 Miami	Hard Rock Stadium • Miami Gardens, FL	W 70–13
September 3	Richmond	Virginia	Scott Stadium • Charlottesville, VA	W 34–17
September 10	Furman	No. 5 Clemson	Memorial Stadium • Clemson, SC	W 35–12
September 10	Western Carolina	Georgia Tech	Bobby Dodd Stadium • Atlanta, GA	W 35–17
September 10	Charleston Southern	No. 18 NC State	Carter–Finley Stadium • Raleigh, NC	W 55–3
September 17	Maine	Boston College	Alumni Stadium • Chestnut Hill, MA	W 38–17
September 17	North Carolina A&T	Duke	Wallace Wade Stadium • Durham, NC	W 49–20
September 17	Wofford	Virginia Tech	Lane Stadium • Blacksburg, VA	W 27–7
September 24	Rhode Island	No. 24 Pittsburgh	Acrisure Stadium • Pittsburgh, PA	W 45–24
October 1	Wagner	Syracuse	JMA Wireless Dome • Syracuse, NY	W 59–0

=== Records against other conferences ===
Regular season

Power 5 Conferences	Record
Big Ten	2–2
Big 12	2–2
BYU/Notre Dame	0–4
Pac-12	0–0
SEC	3–6
Power 5 Total	7–14
Other FBS Conferences	Record
American	4–1
C–USA	1–1
Independents (Excluding BYU & Notre Dame)	5–1
MAC	1–0
Mountain West	0–0
Sun Belt	6–1
Other FBS Total	17–4
FCS Opponents	Record
Football Championship Subdivision	13–0
Total Non-Conference Record	37–18

Post Season

Power Conferences 5	Record
Big Ten	0–2
Big 12	1–0
BYU/Notre Dame	0–0
Pac-12	1–1
SEC	1–1
Power 5 Total	3–4
Other FBS Conferences	Record
American	2–0
C–USA	0–0
Independents (Excluding BYU & Notre Dame)	0–0
MAC	0–0
Mountain West	0–0
Sun Belt	0–0
Other FBS Total	2–0
Total Bowl Record	5–4

== Postseason ==
The bowl games began on December 17, 2022, and will end with the Orange Bowl on December 30, 2022.

=== Bowl games ===
Legend
ACC win
ACC loss
Cancellation

For the 2020–2025 bowl cycle, The ACC will have annually ten appearances in the following bowls: Orange Bowl and Peach Bowl (unless they are selected for playoffs filled by a SEC and at-large team if champion is in the playoffs), Military Bowl, Duke's Mayo Bowl, Gator Bowl, Cheez-It Bowl, Fenway Bowl, ReliaQuest Bowl, Holiday Bowl and Sun Bowl. The ACC teams will go to a New Year's Six bowl if a team finishes higher than the champions of Power Five conferences in the final College Football Playoff rankings. The ACC champion are also eligible for the College Football Playoff if they're among the top four teams in the final CFP ranking.

Bowl game	Date	Site	Television	Time (EST)	ACC team	Opponent	Score	Attendance
Fenway Bowl	December 17	Fenway Park • Boston, MA	ESPN	11:00 a.m.	**Louisville**	Cincinnati	**W** 24–7	15,000
Gasparilla Bowl	December 23	Raymond James Stadium • Tampa, FL	ESPN	6:30 p.m.	**Wake Forest**	Missouri	**W** 27–17	34,370
Military Bowl	December 28	Navy–Marine Corps Memorial Stadium • Annapolis, MD	ESPN	2:00 p.m.	**Duke**	UCF	**W** 30–13	17,974
Holiday Bowl	December 28	Petco Park • San Diego, CA	Fox	8:00 p.m.	**North Carolina**	No. 15 Oregon	**L** 27–28	36,242
Pinstripe Bowl	December 29	Yankee Stadium • Bronx, NY	ESPN	2:00 p.m.	**Syracuse**	Minnesota	**L** 20–28	31,131
Cheez-It Bowl	December 29	Camping World Stadium • Orlando, FL	ESPN	5:30 p.m.	No. 13 **Florida State**	Oklahoma	**W** 35–32	61,520
Duke's Mayo Bowl	December 30	Bank of America Stadium • Charlotte, NC	ESPN	12:00 p.m.	No. 23 **NC State**	Maryland	**L** 12–16	37,228
Sun Bowl	December 30	Sun Bowl • El Paso, TX	CBS	2:00 p.m.	**Pittsburgh**	No. 18 UCLA	**W** 37–35	41,104
**New Year's Six Bowls**
Orange Bowl	December 30	Hard Rock Stadium • Miami Gardens, FL	ESPN	8:00 p.m.	No. 7 **Clemson**	No. 6 Tennessee	**L** 14–31	63,912

Rankings are from CFP rankings. All times Eastern Time Zone. ACC teams shown in bold.

== Awards and honors ==
=== Player of the week honors ===
Week	Quarterback		Running Back		Receiver		Offensive Line		Defensive Line		Linebacker		Defensive Back		Specialist			Rookie		
Week	Player	Team	Player	Team	Player	Team	Player	Team	Player	Team	Player	Team	Player	Team	Player	Team	Position	Player	Team	Position
Week 1	Drake Maye	North Carolina	Sean Tucker	Syracuse	Ontaria Wilson	Florida State	Jalen Rivers	Miami	Jared Verse	Florida State	Marlow Wax	Syracuse	M.J. Devonshire	Pittsburgh	Shyheim Brown	Florida State	DB	Drake Maye	North Carolina	QB
Week 2	Sam Hartman	Wake Forest	Israel Abanikanda	Pittsburgh	A. T. Perry	Wake Forest	Matthew Bergeron	Syracuse	TyJuan Garbutt	Virginia Tech	Cedric Gray	North Carolina	Jaylen Stinson	Duke	Andres Borregales	Miami	PK	Omarion Hampton	North Carolina	RB
Week 3	Garrett Shrader	Syracuse	Will Shipley	Clemson	Johnny Wilson	Florida State	Will Putnam	Clemson	Caleb Okechukwu	Syracuse	Mikel Jones	Syracuse	Aydan White	NC State	Brendan Farrell	Virginia	PK	Nate Yarnell	Pittsburgh	QB
Week 4	DJ Uiagalelei	Clemson	Israel Abanikanda (2)	Pittsburgh	Jahmal Banks	Wake Forest	Jordan McFadden	Clemson	Chico Bennett	Virginia	Mikel Jones (2)	Syracuse	Garrett Williams	Syracuse	Andrew Szymt	Syracuse	PK	Drake Maye (2)	North Carolina	QB
Week 4	DJ Uiagalelei	Clemson	Israel Abanikanda (2)	Pittsburgh	Jahmal Banks	Wake Forest	Grant Gibson	NC State	Chico Bennett	Virginia	Mikel Jones (2)	Syracuse	Garrett Williams	Syracuse	Andrew Szymt	Syracuse	PK	Drake Maye (2)	North Carolina	QB
Week 5	Drake Maye (2)	North Carolina	Hassan Hall	Georgia Tech	Zay Flowers	Boston College	Jacob Monk	Duke	Chibueze Onwuka	Boston College	Charlie Thomas	Georgia Tech	Jammie Robinson	Florida State	Gavin Stewart	Georgia Tech	PK	Drake Maye (3)	North Carolina	QB
Week 5	Drake Maye (2)	North Carolina	Hassan Hall	Georgia Tech	Zay Flowers	Boston College	Michael Jurgens	Wake Forest	Chibueze Onwuka	Boston College	Charlie Thomas	Georgia Tech	Jammie Robinson	Florida State	Gavin Stewart	Georgia Tech	PK	Drake Maye (3)	North Carolina	QB
Week 6	Tyler Van Dyke	Miami	Israel Abanikanda (3)	Pittsburgh	Kaleb Smith	Virginia Tech	Marcus Minor	Pittsburgh	Xavier Thomas	Clemson	Drake Thomas	NC State	DeAndre Boykins	North Carolina	Christopher Dunn	NC State	PK	Drake Maye (4)	North Carolina	QB
Week 7	Drake Maye (3)	North Carolina	Will Shipley (2)	Clemson	Oronde Gadsen II	Syracuse	Matthew Bergeron (2)	Syracuse	Akheen Mesidor	Miami	Jeremiah Trotter Jr.	Clemson	DeAndre Boykins (2)	North Carolina	Lou Hedley	Miami	P	Drake Maye (5)	North Carolina	QB
Week 8	Sam Hartman (2)	Wake Forest	Will Shipley (3)	Clemson	Colbie Young	Miami	Jordan McFadden (2)	Clemson	Chico Bennett (2)	Virginia	Yasir Abdullah	Louisville	Brandon Johnson	Duke	Todd Pelino	Duke	PK	Chandler Rivers	Duke	DB
Week 9	Drake Maye (4)	North Carolina	Trey Benson	Florida State	Antoine Green	North Carolina	D'Mitri Emmanuel	Florida State	Leonard Taylor III	Miami	Nick Jackson	Virginia	Quincey Riley	Louisville	Andres Borregales (2)	Miami	PK	MJ Morris	NC State	QB
Week 10	Drake Maye (5)	North Carolina	Trey Benson (2)	Florida State	Josh Downs	North Carolina	Dillan Gibbons	Florida State	Deslin Alexandre	Pittsburgh	Charlie Thomas (2)	Georgia Tech	Clayton Powell-Lee	Georgia Tech	Tucker Holloway	Virginia Tech	PR	MJ Morris (2)	NC State	QB
Week 10	Drake Maye (5)	North Carolina	Trey Benson (2)	Florida State	Josh Downs	North Carolina	Dillan Gibbons	Florida State	Deslin Alexandre	Pittsburgh	Isaiah Moore	NC State	Clayton Powell-Lee	Georgia Tech	Tucker Holloway	Virginia Tech	PR	Zach Pyron	Georgia Tech	QB
Week 11	Drake Maye (6)	North Carolina	Trey Benson (3)	Florida State	Josh Downs (2)	North Carolina	Maurice Smith	Florida State	Calijah Kancey	Pittsburgh	Barrett Carter	Clemson	Kamren Kinchens	Miami	Lou Hedley (2)	Miami	P	Emmett Morehead	Boston College	QB
Week 11	Drake Maye (6)	North Carolina	Trey Benson (3)	Florida State	Josh Downs (2)	North Carolina	Maurice Smith	Florida State	Calijah Kancey	Pittsburgh	Barrett Carter	Clemson	Kamren Kinchens	Miami	Daniel Sparks	Virginia	P	Emmett Morehead	Boston College	QB
Week 12	Sam Hartman (3)	Wake Forest	Israel Abanikanda (4)	Pittsburgh	Jordan Moore	Duke	Will Putnam (2)	Clemson	Keion White	Georgia Tech	SirVocea Dennis	Pittsburgh	Brandon Hill	Pittsburgh	James Turner	Louisville	PK	LeQuint Allen	Syracuse	RB
Week 12	Sam Hartman (3)	Wake Forest	Israel Abanikanda (4)	Pittsburgh	A. T. Perry (2)	Wake Forest	Will Putnam (2)	Clemson	Keion White	Georgia Tech	SirVocea Dennis	Pittsburgh	Brandon Hill	Pittsburgh	Ben Sauls	Pittsburgh	PK	LeQuint Allen	Syracuse	RB
Week 13	Riley Leonard	Duke	Trey Benson (4)	Florida State	Jared Wayne	Pittsburgh	Maurice Smith (2)	Florida State	Dayon Hayes	Pittsburgh	Jeremiah Trotter Jr. (2)	Clemson	Darius Joiner	Duke	Christopher Dunn (2)	NC State	PK	Javon McIntyre	Pittsburgh	S
Week 13	Riley Leonard	Duke	Trey Benson (4)	Florida State	Jared Wayne	Pittsburgh	Maurice Smith (2)	Florida State	Dayon Hayes	Pittsburgh	Jeremiah Trotter Jr. (2)	Clemson	Erick Hallett	Pittsburgh	Christopher Dunn (2)	NC State	PK	Javon McIntyre	Pittsburgh	S

=== All-Conference teams ===
First Team

Position	Player	Team
First Team Offense
QB	Drake Maye	North Carolina
RB	Israel Abanikanda	Pittsburgh
RB	Will Shipley	Clemson
WR	Zay Flowers	Boston College
WR	Josh Downs	North Carolina
WR	A. T. Perry	Wake Forest
TE	Oronde Gadsden II	Syracuse
All Purpose Back	Will Shipley	Clemson
T	Jordan McFadden	Clemson
T	Graham Barton	Duke
G	Dillan Gibbons	Florida State
G	Chandler Zavala (tie)	NC State
G	Marcus Minor (tie)	Pittsburgh
C	Grant Gibson	NC State
First Team Defense
DE	Jared Verse	Florida State
DE	Myles Murphy	Clemson
DT	Calijah Kancey	Pittsburgh
DT	Tyler Davis	Clemson
LB	Cedric Gray	North Carolina
LB	Yasir Abdullah	Louisville
LB	SirVocea Dennis	Pittsburgh
CB	Aydan White	NC State
CB	Anthony Johnson	Virginia
S	Kamren Kinchens	Miami
S	Jammie Robinson	Florida State
First Team Special Teams
PK	Christopher Dunn	NC State
P	Lou Hedley	Miami
SP	Will Shipley	Clemson

Second Team

Position	Player	Team
Second Team Offense
QB	Jordan Travis	Florida State
RB	Sean Tucker	Syracuse
RB	Trey Benson	Florida State
WR	Jared Wayne	Pittsburgh
WR	Tyler Hudson	Louisville
WR	Johnny Wilson	Florida State
TE	Will Mallory	Miami
All Purpose Back	Josh Downs	North Carolina
T	Matthew Bergeron	Syracuse
T	Robert Scott	Florida State
G	Sean Maginn	Wake Forest
G	Caleb Chandler	Louisville
C	Bryan Hudson	Louisville
Second Team Defense
DE	KJ Henry	Clemson
DE	Donovan Ezeiruaku	Boston College
DT	DeWayne Carter	Duke
DT	Bryan Bresee	Clemson
LB	Drake Thomas	NC State
LB	Nick Jackson	Virginia
LB	Ayinde Eley	Georgia Tech
CB	Fentrell Cypress	Virginia
CB	Storm Duck	North Carolina
S	Tanner Ingle	NC State
S	Erick Hallett	Pittsburgh
Second Team Special Teams
PK	B. T. Potter	Clemson
P	Daniel Sparks	Virginia
SP	M.J. Devonshire	Pittsburgh

Third Team

Position	Player	Team
Third Team Offense
QB	Sam Hartman	Wake Forest
RB	Henry Parrish Jr.	Miami
RB	Justice Ellison	Wake Forest
WR	Jalon Calhoun	Duke
WR	Antoine Green	North Carolina
WR	Keytaon Thompson	Virginia
TE	Davis Allen	Clemson
All Purpose Back	Sean Tucker	Syracuse
T	Matt Goncalves	Pittsburgh
T	Asim Richards	North Carolina
G	D'Mitri Emmanuel	Florida State
G	Sean Maginn	Pittsburgh
C	Will Putnam	Clemson
Third Team Defense
DE	YaYa Diaby	Louisville
DE	Keion White	Georgia Tech
DT	Kobie Turner	Wake Forest
DT	Cory Durden	NC State
LB	Charlie Thomas	Georgia Tech
LB	Trenton Simpson	Clemson
LB	Mikel Jones	Syracuse
CB	Kei'Trel Clark	Louisville
CB	Tyrique Stevenson	Miami
S	Darius Joiner	Duke
S	LaMiles Brooks	Georgia Tech
Third Team Special Teams
PK	James Turner	Louisville
P	Ben Kiernan	North Carolina
SP	Jalon Calhoun	Duke

=== ACC individual awards ===
ACC Player of the Year

Drake Maye, North Carolina

ACC Rookie of the Year

Drake Maye, North Carolina

ACC Coach of the Year

Mike Elko, Duke

ACC Offensive Player of the Year

Drake Maye, North Carolina

ACC Offensive Rookie of the Year

Drake Maye, North Carolina

Jacobs Blocking Trophy

Jordan McFadden, Clemson

ACC Defensive Player of the Year

Calijah Kancey, Pittsburgh

ACC Defensive Rookie of the Year

Patrick Payton, Florida State

=== All-Americans ===
==== Consensus All-Americans ====
Currently, the NCAA compiles consensus all-America teams in the sports of Division I FBS football and Division I men's basketball using a point system computed from All-America teams named by coaches associations or media sources. Players are chosen against other players playing at their position only. To be selected a consensus All-American, players must be chosen to the first team on at least half of the five official selectors as recognized by the NCAA. Second- and third-team honors are used to break ties. Players named first-team by all five selectors are deemed unanimous All-Americans. Currently, the NCAA recognizes All-Americans selected by the AP, AFCA, FWAA, TSN, and the WCFF to determine consensus and unanimous All-Americans.

2022 Consensus All-Americans
Unanimous	Consensus
Calijah Kancey – Pittsburgh	Christopher Dunn – NC State

==== Associated Press ====
2022 AP All-Americans
First Team	Second Team	Third Team
Christopher Dunn – NC State; Calijah Kancey – Pittsburgh; Kamren Kinchens – Miami	Josh Downs – North Carolina; Jeremiah Trotter Jr. – Clemson	Israel Abanikanda – Pittsburgh; Zay Flowers – Boston College

==== AFCA ====
2022 AFCA All-Americans
First Team	Second Team
Calijah Kancey – Pittsburgh; Christopher Dunn – NC State	Joe Shimko – NC State

==== FWAA ====
2022 FWAA All-Americans
First Team	Second Team
Calijah Kancey – Pittsburgh; Christopher Dunn – NC State	Israel Abanikanda – Pittsburgh; Josh Downs – North Carolina; Tyler Davis – Clemson; Erick Hallett – Pittsburgh

==== The Sporting News ====
2022 Sporting News All-Americans
First Team	Second Team
Calijah Kancey – Pittsburgh; Kamren Kinchens – Miami	Cedric Gray – North Carolina; Christopher Dunn – NC State

==== WCFF ====
2022 Walter Camp All-Americans
First Team	Second Team
Christopher Dunn – NC State; Calijah Kancey – Pittsburgh	None

=== National Awards ===
- Wuerffel Trophy: Dillan Gibbons, Florida State
- Disney Spirit Award: Tylee Craft, North Carolina
- Lou Groza Award: Christopher Dunn, NC State

== Home game attendance ==
Team	Stadium	Capacity	Game 1	Game 2	Game 3	Game 4	Game 5	Game 6	Game 7	Total	Average	% of Capacity
Boston College	Alumni Stadium	44,500	35,048	34,325	38,517	42,138†	34,092	30,113		214,233	35,706	80.24%
Clemson	Memorial Stadium	81,500	78,302	80,542	81,500	81,500	80,176	81,340	81,500	564,860	80,694	99.01%
Duke	Wallace Wade Stadium	40,004	20,722	32,802	15,152	40,004†	20,857	17,492		147,029	24,505	61.26%
Florida State	Doak Campbell Stadium	79,560	51,207	79,560†	69,749	71,098	61,007	58,597	79,560†	470,778	67,254	84.53%
Georgia Tech	Bobby Dodd Stadium	55,000	36,486	40,293†	32,041	29,362	33,857			172,039	34,408	62.56%
Louisville	Cardinal Stadium	60,800	46,459†	41,217	41,840	39,503	42,157	38,974		250,150	41,692	68.57%
Miami	Hard Rock Stadium	65,326	56,795	46,422	46,713	53,751	57,421	**66,200**†	46,428	373,730	53,390	81.73%
North Carolina	Kenan Memorial Stadium	50,500	46,130	50,500	45,029	50,500	44,940	50,500		287,599	47,933	94.92%
NC State	Carter–Finley Stadium	56,919	54,169	56,919	56,919	56,919	56,919	56,919	56,919	395,683	56,526	99.31%
Pittsburgh	Acrisure Stadium	68,400	**70,622**†	59,785	54,667	46,972	54,677	50,888	45,362	382,973	54,710	79.99%
Syracuse	JMA Wireless Dome	49,057	37,110	35,943	34,590	33,373	**49,705**	**49,861**†	45,213	285,795	40,828	83.23%
Virginia	Scott Stadium	61,500	41,122	40,556	38,009	43,714	44,156†	36,529		244,086	40,681	66.15%
Virginia Tech	Lane Stadium	65,632	65,632	62,043	65,632	65,632	62,843			321,782	64,356	98.06%
Wake Forest	BB&T Field	31,500	26,013	**32,891**	**32,903**†	**32,524**	28,530	31,346	26,164	210,371	30,053	95.41%

Bold – Exceeded capacity
†Season High

== NFL draft ==
The following list includes all ACC players who were drafted in the 2023 NFL draft.

Player	Position	School	Draft Round	Round Pick	Overall Pick	Team
Calijah Kancey	DT	Pittsburgh	1	19	19	Tampa Bay Buccaneers
Zay Flowers	WR	Boston College	1	22	22	Baltimore Ravens
Myles Murphy	DE	Clemson	1	28	28	Cincinnati Bengals
Bryan Bresee	DT	Clemson	1	29	29	New Orleans Saints
Matthew Bergeron	OT	Syracuse	2	7	38	Atlanta Falcons
Keion White	DE	Georgia Tech	2	15	46	New England Patriots
Tyrique Stevenson	CB	Miami	2	25	56	Chicago Bears
Garrett Williams	CB	Syracuse	3	9	72	Arizona Cardinals
Josh Downs	WR	North Carolina	3	16	79	Indianapolis Colts
YaYa Diaby	DE	Louisville	3	19	82	Tampa Bay Buccaneers
Trenton Simpson	LB	Clemson	3	23	86	Baltimore Ravens
Kobie Turner	DE	Wake Forest	3	26	89	Los Angeles Rams
Chandler Zavala	OG	NC State	4	12	114	Carolina Panthers
Chamarri Conner	S	Virginia Tech	4	17	119	Kansas City Chiefs
Carter Warren	OT	Pittsburgh	4	18	120	New York Jets
Yasir Abdullah	LB	Louisville	5	1	136	Jacksonville Jaguars
KJ Henry	DE	Clemson	5	2	137	Washington Commanders
Israel Abanikanda	RB	Pittsburgh	5	8	143	New York Jets
Jammie Robinson	S	Florida State	5	10	145	Carolina Panthers
SirVocea Dennis	LB	Pittsburgh	5	18	153	Tampa Bay Buccaneers
Jordan McFadden	OG	Clemson	5	21	156	Los Angeles Chargers
Dontayvion Wicks	WR	Virginia	5	24	159	Green Bay Packers
Will Mallory	TE	Miami	5	27	162	Indianapolis Colts
Asim Richards	OT	North Carolina	5	34	169	Dallas Cowboys
Davis Allen	TE	Clemson	5	40	175	Los Angeles Rams
Kei'Trel Clark	CB	Louisville	6	3	180	Arizona Cardinals
A. T. Perry	WR	Wake Forest	6	18	195	New Orleans Saints
Erick Hallett	S	Pittsburgh	6	31	208	Jacksonville Jaguars
Antoine Green	WR	North Carolina	7	2	219	Detroit Lions
Raymond Vohasek	DT	North Carolina	7	10	227	Jacksonville Jaguars
D. J. Ivey	CB	Miami	7	29	246	Cincinnati Bengals
Brandon Hill	S	Pittsburgh	7	31	248	Houston Texans
