= Charlie Thomas (linebacker) =

American football player (born 2000)

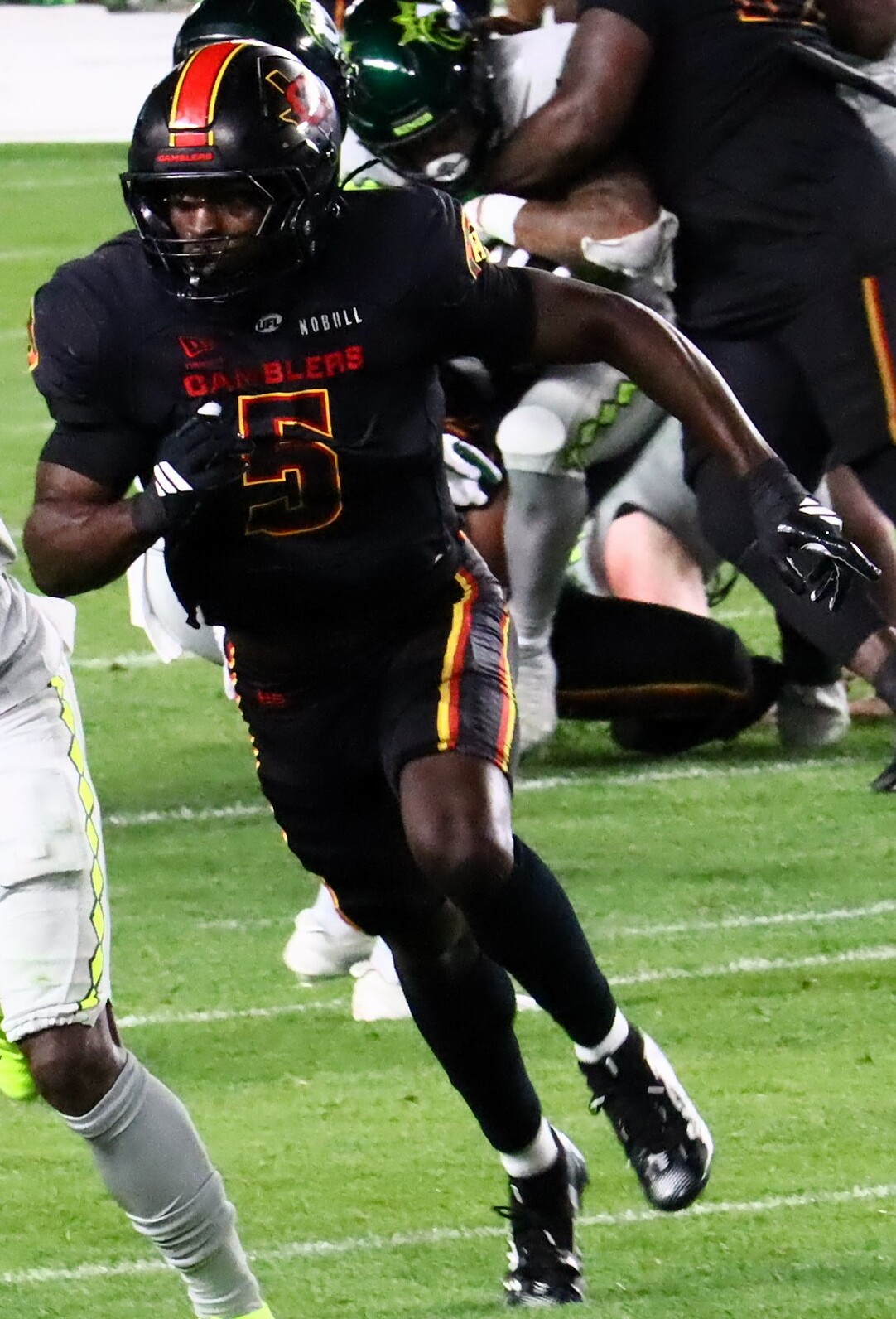
- Thomas with the Houston Gamblers in 2026

No. 5 – Dallas Renegades
- Position: Linebacker
- Roster status: Active

Personal information
- Born: January 31, 2000 (age 26); Thomasville, Georgia, U.S.
- Listed height: 6 ft 3 in (1.91 m)
- Listed weight: 220 lb (100 kg)

Career information
- High school: Thomasville
- College: Georgia Tech (2018–2022)
- NFL draft: 2023: undrafted

Career history
- Cleveland Browns (2023); Arlington Renegades (2025); Cleveland Browns (2025)*; Houston Gamblers (2026); Dallas Renegades (2027–present)
- * Offseason or practice squad member only

Awards and highlights
- Third-team All-ACC (2022)

Career NFL statistics
- Total Tackles: 2
- Stats at Pro Football Reference

Charlie Thomas III (born January 31, 2000) is an American football linebacker for the Dallas Renegades of the United Football League (UFL). He played college football for the Georgia Tech Yellow Jackets, and has played in the United Football League (UFL) for the Arlington Renegades.

== Early life ==
Thomas grew up in Thomasville, Georgia and attended Thomasville High School. In high school he was named a two-time all-state and all-region team. In Thomas's senior year he recorded 78 tackles and helped lead Thomasville to an undefeated regular season for the first time in 29 years Thomas would decide to commit to play college football at Georgia Tech over as teams such as Auburn and Ole Miss.

== College career ==
Thomas played at Georgia Tech for five years, recording 313 tackles, 37 being for a loss, 10 sacks, four interceptions, five pass deflections, six fumble recoveries, and seven forced fumbles. In 2021 he put up 70 tackles, 10 going for a loss, three sacks, two interceptions, a fumble recovery, and a forced fumble. For his efforts on the year he was named an All-Atlantic Coast Conference (ACC) honorable mention. However Thomas's best season came in 2022 where he put up 112 tackles, 10.5 being for a loss, two sacks, two interceptions, two pass deflections, two fumble recoveries, and two forced fumbles, For his great performance on the year he was named Third team All-ACC.

== Professional career ==
Pre-draft measurables
Height	Weight	Arm length	Hand span	Wingspan	40-yard dash	10-yard split	20-yard split	20-yard shuttle	Three-cone drill	Vertical jump	Broad jump	Bench press
6 ft 2 5/8 in (1.90 m)	216 lb (98 kg)	31 1/2 in (0.80 m)	8 1/2 in (0.22 m)	6 ft 5 1/4 in (1.96 m)	4.52 s	1.55 s	2.61 s	4.34 s	7.09 s	32.5 in (0.83 m)	10 ft 4 in (3.15 m)	18 reps
All values from NFL Combine

=== Cleveland Browns (first stint) ===
After not being selected in the 2023 NFL draft, Thomas signed with the Cleveland Browns as an undrafted free agent. He was waived on August 29, 2023 and re-signed to the practice squad. Thomas signed a reserve/future contract on January 15, 2024. He was placed on injured reserve on August 1. Thomas was released from IR on August 5.

=== Arlington Renegades ===
On March 6, 2025, Thomas signed with the Arlington Renegades of the United Football League (UFL).

=== Cleveland Browns (second stint) ===
On August 21, 2025, the Cleveland Browns signed Thomas. Thomas was waived by the Browns on August 24.

=== Houston Gamblers ===
On January 13, 2026, Thomas was drafted by the Houston Gamblers of the United Football League (UFL).

== Personal life ==
Thomas has a degree from Georgia Tech in business administration.
