= SirVocea Dennis =

American football player (born 2000)

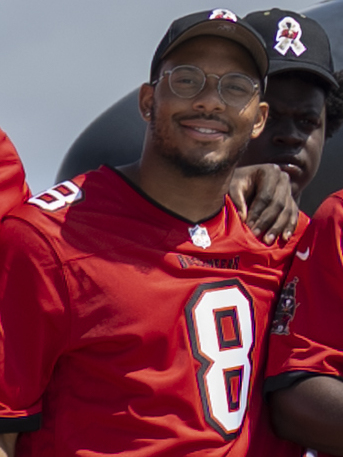
- Dennis with the Tampa Bay Buccaneers in 2023

No. 8 – Tampa Bay Buccaneers
- Position: Linebacker
- Roster status: Active

Personal information
- Born: March 9, 2000 (age 26); Syracuse, New York, U.S.
- Listed height: 6 ft 0 in (1.83 m)
- Listed weight: 230 lb (104 kg)

Career information
- High school: Christian Brothers (Syracuse); Peddie (Hightstown, New Jersey)
- College: Pittsburgh (2019–2022)
- NFL draft: 2023: 5th round, 153rd overall pick

Career history
- Tampa Bay Buccaneers (2023–present)

Awards and highlights
- First-team All-ACC (2022); Second-team All-ACC (2021)

Career NFL statistics as of Week 7, 2026
- Total tackles: 144
- Sacks: 4
- Pass deflections: 6
- Interceptions: 1
- Stats at Pro Football Reference

SirVocea Levitticus Dennis (sir-VAH-see-ay; born March 9, 2000) is an American professional football linebacker for the Tampa Bay Buccaneers of the National Football League (NFL). He played college football for the Pittsburgh Panthers.

== Early life ==
Dennis was born on March 9, 2000, in Syracuse, New York. He is the son of SirVantis Dennis and Corliss Dennis. He attended and played high school football at Christian Brothers Academy. He played both quarterback and defensive back, leading the team to two Section III championships. He also played basketball and lacrosse. However, as a senior he suffered a torn Achilles tendon and, as that put doubt on his college football career, Dennis decided to play a postgraduate year at the Peddie School. At Peddie, he was named the Mid-Atlantic Prep League Defensive Player of the Year. He was only a two-star college recruit, and after initially committing to Air Force switched to Pittsburgh, the only Power Five team to make an offer.

== College career ==
Dennis joined Pittsburgh as a linebacker. As a freshman in 2019, he appeared in eight games as a special teams player. He saw more defensive action in 2020, appearing in 10 games, two as a starter, and posted a team-leading 14.5 tackles-for-loss, a total that placed top ten nationally, as well as 57 tackles and four sacks, on his way to being named third-team all-conference. In 2021, he started 13 games and led the team with 87 total tackles as well as 9.5 tackles-for-loss, four sacks, one blocked field goal, an interception and a fumble recovery, being named second-team All-Atlantic Coast Conference.

Dennis became a team captain as a senior in 2022 and started 12 games, recording 94 tackles, a team-best, as well as nine sacks, 12 tackles-for-loss and two forced fumbles. He was a first-team all-conference selection and was named third-team All-American by Pro Football Focus. After the regular season, Dennis declared for the NFL draft and skipped Pittsburgh's bowl game, finishing his college career with 233 tackles, 36.0 tackles-for-loss, 15.0 sacks, two forced fumbles and two interceptions.

== Professional career ==
Pre-draft measurables
Height	Weight	Arm length	Hand span	Wingspan	40-yard dash	10-yard split	20-yard split	20-yard shuttle	Vertical jump	Broad jump	Bench press
6 ft 0 1/2 in (1.84 m)	226 lb (103 kg)	32 7/8 in (0.84 m)	10 5/8 in (0.27 m)	6 ft 6 7/8 in (2.00 m)	4.64 s	1.66 s	2.66 s	4.36 s	41.5 in (1.05 m)	10 ft 5 in (3.18 m)	19 reps
All values from NFL Combine/Pro Day

Dennis impressed at his pro day and was projected as a late-round pick in the 2023 NFL draft. He was selected in the fifth round (153rd overall) by the Tampa Bay Buccaneers.

== NFL career statistics ==
Legend
**Bold**	Career high

=== Regular season ===
Year	Team	Games		Tackles					Interceptions						Fumbles				
Year	Team	GP	GS	Cmb	Solo	Ast	Sck	TFL	Int	Yds	Avg	Lng	TD	PD	FF	Fmb	FR	Yds	TD
2023	TB	13	0	13	11	2	0.0	0	0	0	0.0	0	0	1	0	0	0	0	0
2024	TB	4	0	22	14	8	1.0	1	0	0	0.0	0	0	0	0	0	0	0	0
2025	TB	16	16	**101**	**66**	**35**	**3.0**	**10**	**1**	0	0.0	0	0	**5**	0	0	0	0	0
Career		33	16	136	91	45	4.0	11	1	0	0.0	0	0	6	0	0	0	0	0

=== Postseason ===
Year	Team	Games		Tackles					Interceptions						Fumbles				
Year	Team	GP	GS	Cmb	Solo	Ast	Sck	TFL	Int	Yds	Avg	Lng	TD	PD	FF	Fmb	FR	Yds	TD
2023	TB	2	0	1	0	1	0.0	0	0	0	0.0	0	0	0	0	0	0	0	0
Career		2	0	1	0	1	0.0	0	0	0	0.0	0	0	0	0	0	0	0	0
