= Kei'Trel Clark =

American football player (born 2001)

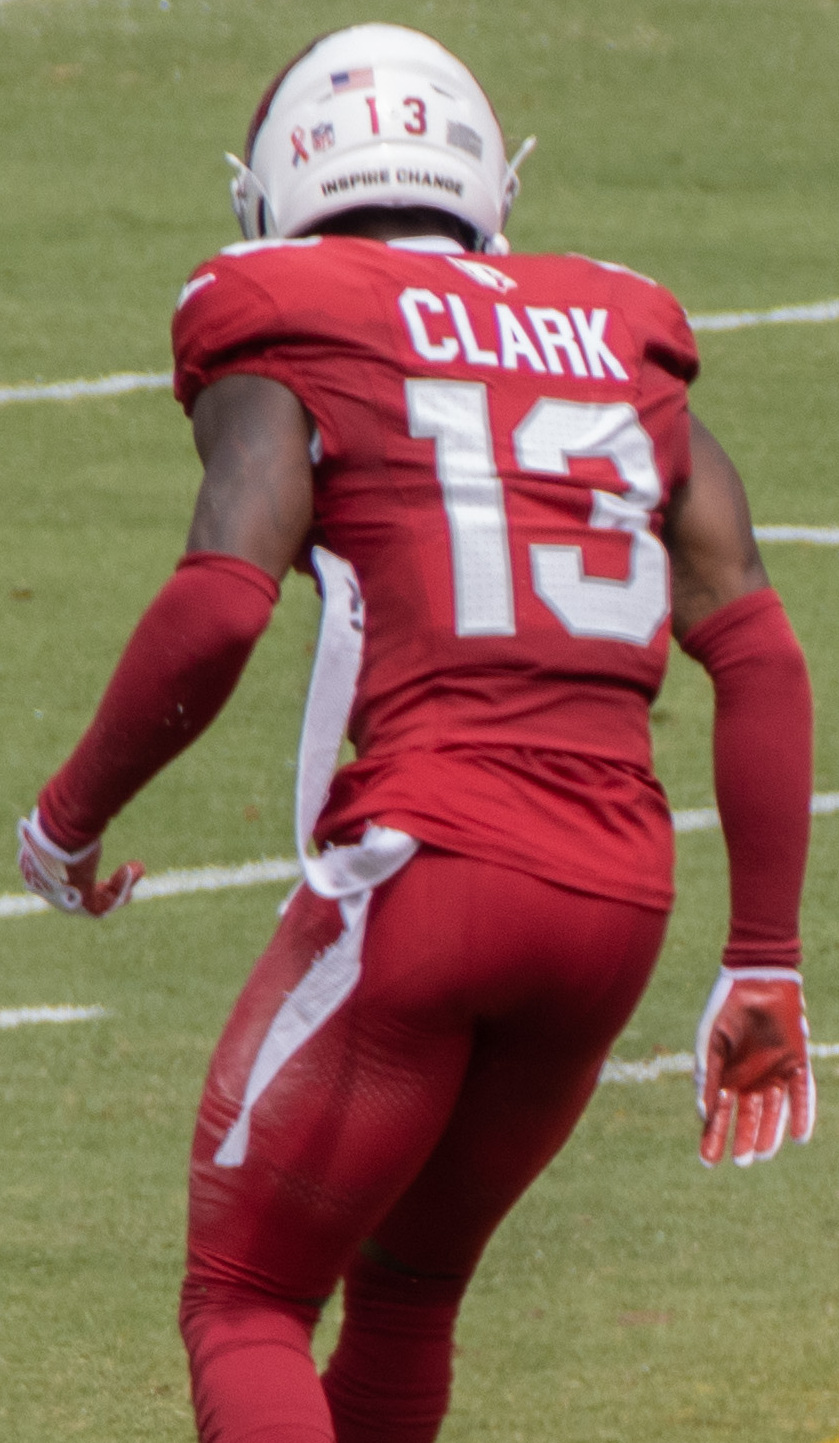
- Clark with the Arizona Cardinals in 2023

No. 13 – Arizona Cardinals
- Position: Cornerback
- Roster status: Active

Personal information
- Born: March 19, 2001 (age 25); Midlothian, Virginia, U.S.
- Listed height: 5 ft 10 in (1.78 m)
- Listed weight: 181 lb (82 kg)

Career information
- High school: Manchester (Midlothian)
- College: Liberty (2019); Louisville (2020–2022)
- NFL draft: 2023: 6th round, 180th overall pick

Career history
- Arizona Cardinals (2023–present)

Awards and highlights
- Second-team All-ACC (2021); Third-team All-ACC (2022)

Career NFL statistics as of Week 5, 2026
- Total tackles: 84
- Sacks: 1
- Forced fumbles: 1
- Interceptions: 1
- Pass deflections: 9
- Stats at Pro Football Reference

Kei'Trel Clark (born March 19, 2001) is an American professional football cornerback for the Arizona Cardinals of the National Football League (NFL). He played college football for the Liberty Flames and Louisville Cardinals.

== Early life ==
Clark attended Manchester High School in Midlothian, Virginia. He committed to Liberty University to play college football.

== College career ==
Clark appeared in 13 games and made seven starts as a true freshman at Liberty in 2019. He recorded 38 tackles and one sack. After the season, he entered the transfer portal citing "racial insensitivity" within the program as the reason. He transferred to the University of Louisville and was granted immediate eligibility. In 2021, he played in eight games before suffering a season-ending torn ACL. During his three years at Louisville, he had 127 tackles, five interceptions, one touchdown and one sack. After the 2022 season, he declared for the 2023 NFL draft.

== Professional career ==
Pre-draft measurables
Height	Weight	Arm length	Hand span	Wingspan	40-yard dash	10-yard split	20-yard split	20-yard shuttle	Vertical jump	Broad jump	Bench press
5 ft 10 1/4 in (1.78 m)	181 lb (82 kg)	29 5/8 in (0.75 m)	8 1/4 in (0.21 m)	6 ft 0 3/8 in (1.84 m)	4.42 s	1.49 s	2.51 s	4.21 s	34.5 in (0.88 m)	10 ft 2 in (3.10 m)	15 reps
All values from NFL Combine/Pro Day

Clark was selected by the Arizona Cardinals in the sixth round, 180th overall, of the 2023 NFL draft. He made 14 appearances (seven starts) as a rookie, compiling four pass deflections and 43 combined tackles.

Clark entered the 2025 campaign as one of Arizona's auxiliary defensive backs. In 14 appearances (one start) for the Cardinals, he recorded two pass deflections, one forced fumble, and 25 combined tackles. On December 30, 2025, Clark was placed on season-ending injured reserve due to a back injury suffered in Week 17 against the Cincinnati Bengals.

== NFL career statistics ==
Legend
**Bold**	Career high

=== Regular season ===
Year	Team	Games		Tackles					Interceptions						Fumbles				
Year	Team	GP	GS	Cmb	Solo	Ast	Sck	TFL	Int	Yds	Avg	Lng	TD	PD	FF	Fum	FR	Yds	TD
2023	ARI	14	7	**43**	**37**	6	0.0	**2**	0	0	0.0	0	0	**4**	0	0	0	0	0
2024	ARI	15	1	12	6	6	**1.0**	1	**1**	0	0.0	0	0	1	0	0	0	0	0
2025	ARI	14	1	25	17	**8**	0.0	1	0	0	0.0	0	0	2	**1**	0	0	0	0
2026	ARI	5	0	4	2	2	0.0	0	0	0	0.0	0	0	2	0	0	0	0	0
Career		48	9	84	62	22	1.0	4	1	0	0.0	0	0	9	1	0	0	0	0
