= Lou Hedley =

Australian-born American football player (born 1993)

Profile
- Position: Punter

Personal information
- Born: 26 June 1993 (age 33); Mandurah, Western Australia, Australia
- Listed height: 6 ft 4 in (1.93 m)
- Listed weight: 220 lb (100 kg)

Career information
- College: CCSF (2017); Miami (FL) (2019–2022)
- NFL draft: 2023: undrafted
- CFL draft: 2023G: 2nd round, 13th overall pick

Career history
- New Orleans Saints (2023)

Awards and highlights
- First-team All-ACC (2022); 2× Second-team All-ACC (2020, 2021)

Career NFL statistics
- Punts: 75
- Punting yards: 3,224
- Punting average: 43
- Longest punt: 62
- Inside 20: 31
- Stats at Pro Football Reference

Louis Hedley (born 26 June 1993) is an Australian professional American football punter. He played college football at CCSF before transferring to Miami (FL).

== Early life ==
Hedley grew up in Mandurah, Western Australia and originally played Australian rules football. He started playing juniors with the Mandurah Mustangs in the Peel Football League before five seasons with the South Mandurah Falcons in the Metro Football League where he was a premiership player. He played senior football in 2013 with Peel Thunder for a season in the West Australian Football League though did not break into the senior side. Known for his long kicking he was invited to join the ProKick Australia during that season, aiming for a potential American football career.

== College career ==
Hedley played one season of college football at City College of San Francisco in 2017, where he averaged 38.6 yards per punt.

On 5 February 2019, Hedley officially signed with the Miami Hurricanes.

Hedley played four years at Miami. He played in 46 career games, punting 208 times for 9,392 yards and an average of 45.2 yards. In 2019, Hedley punted 64 times for 2,808 and an average of 43.9 yards per punt. He also had the only rush of his career going for 21 yards. During the 2020 season Hedley would punt 49 times, for 2,311 yards, and an average of 47.2 yards per punt. For his performance on the year he was named to the All-Atlantic Coast Conference (ACC) second team, and he was named one of the three finalists for the Ray Guy Award. In the 2021 season Hedley would punt 49 times for 2,189 yards, for an average of 44.7 yards per punt. Once again for his efforts he was named second-team All-ACC. Hedley would also be named one of the ten semifinalists for the Ray Guy Award. In Hedley's last season in 2022, he punted 46 times for 2,084 yards and an average of 45.3 yards per punt. For his performance he would be named first-team All-ACC for the first time in his career. He was named a semifinalist for the Ray Guy Award for the second year in a row. He was also named a semifinalist for the William V. Campbell Trophy.

After the 2022 season, Hedley announced he would forgo his last season of eligibility with Miami to declare for the NFL draft.

== Professional career ==
Pre-draft measurables
Height	Weight	Arm length	Hand span	Wingspan
6 ft 2 7/8 in (1.90 m)	222 lb (101 kg)	31 1/4 in (0.79 m)	9 1/4 in (0.23 m)	6 ft 4 1/2 in (1.94 m)
All values from Pro Day

After not being selected in the 2023 NFL draft, Hedley signed with the New Orleans Saints as an undrafted free agent. On 29 August 2023, he made the initial 53-man roster. Hedley was also drafted in the second round (13th overall) of the 2023 CFL global draft by the Hamilton Tiger-Cats. He finished his rookie season with the Saints with 75 punts for 3,224 yards for a 42.99 average.

On August 27, 2024, Hedley was waived by the Saints after losing the starting job to rookie Matthew Hayball.
