= Tanner Ingle =

American football player (born 1999)

No. 34 – Los Angeles Rams
- Position: Safety
- Roster status: Practice squad

Personal information
- Born: October 29, 1999 (age 27); Orlando, Florida, U.S.
- Listed height: 5 ft 8 in (1.73 m)
- Listed weight: 186 lb (84 kg)

Career information
- High school: Dr. Phillips (Orlando)
- College: NC State (2018–2022)
- NFL draft: 2023: undrafted

Career history
- Los Angeles Rams (2023–present)

Awards and highlights
- First-team All-ACC (2021); Second-team All-ACC (2022)

Career NFL statistics as of 2025
- Tackles: 2
- Stats at Pro Football Reference

Tanner Ingle (born October 29, 1999) is an American professional football safety for the Los Angeles Rams of the National Football League (NFL). He played college football for the NC State Wolfpack.

== Early life ==
Ingle grew up in Orlando, Florida, and attended Dr. Phillips High School. In his high school career, he racked up nine interceptions and nine touchdowns. He was a team captain for his high school squad and was named first-team all-state. He would commit to play college football at NC State.

== College career ==
Ingle played five years for the Wolfpack. During his time he posted 311 tackles, 23 being for a loss, 3 interceptions, 13 pass deflections, and 3 forced fumbles. His best season occurred during the 2021 season where he put up 82 tackles, 3.5 going for a loss, an interception, and 4 pass deflections. For his performance of the year he was named First-team All-Atlantic Coast Conference (ACC). Ingle also had an outstanding senior year in 2022 where he posted 83 tackles, 8 going for a loss, 2 picks, and 2 pass deflections. He was named to the second team All-ACC for his performance on the year. On November 25, 2022, Ingle made an outstanding interception that helped the Wolfpack beat their rival North Carolina.

== Professional career ==
Pre-draft measurables
Height	Weight	Arm length	Hand span	Wingspan
5 ft 8 3/4 in (1.75 m)	179 lb (81 kg)	28 1/8 in (0.71 m)	9 in (0.23 m)	5 ft 9 1/4 in (1.76 m)
All values from Pro Day

After not being selected in the 2023 NFL draft, Ingle would sign with the Los Angeles Rams as an undrafted free agent. He was waived on August 29, 2023 and re-signed to the practice squad. Ingle signed a reserve/future contract with the Rams on January 15, 2024.

Ingle was waived by the Rams on August 27, 2024, and re-signed to the practice squad. He signed a reserve/future contract by Los Angeles on January 20, 2025.

On August 26, 2025, Ingle was waived by the Rams as part of final roster cuts and re-signed to the practice squad the next day. He was promoted to the active roster on November 22, but waived two days later and re-signed back to the practice squad. Ingle was re-signed back to the practice squad on November 26.

On January 27, 2026, Ingle signed a reserve/futures contract with Los Angeles. On August 30, Ingle was waived by Los Angeles as a part of final roster cuts; he was re-signed to the team's practice squad the following day. On September 18, Ingle was signed to the active roster. On September 29, he was waived and re-signed to the practice squad two days later.

== NFL career statistics ==
=== Regular season ===
Year	Team	Games		Tackles					Interceptions						Fumbles				
Year	Team	GP	GS	Cmb	Solo	Ast	Sck	TFL	Int	Yds	Avg	Lng	TD	PD	FF	Fum	FR	Yds	TD
2025	LAR	3	0	2	1	1	0.0	0	0	0	0.0	0	0	0	0	0	0	0	0
Career		3	0	2	1	1	0.0	0	0	0	0.0	0	0	0	0	0	0	0	0

=== Postseason ===
Year	Team	Games		Tackles					Interceptions						Fumbles				
Year	Team	GP	GS	Cmb	Solo	Ast	Sck	TFL	Int	Yds	Avg	Lng	TD	PD	FF	Fum	FR	Yds	TD
2025	LAR	1	0	1	1	0	0.0	0	0	0	0.0	0	0	0	0	0	0	0	0
Career		1	0	1	1	0	0.0	0	0	0	0.0	0	0	0	0	0	0	0	0
