= Yasir Abdullah =

American football player (born 2000)

No. 22 – Atlanta Falcons
- Position: Linebacker
- Roster status: Active

Personal information
- Born: April 12, 2000 (age 26); Miami, Florida, U.S.
- Listed height: 6 ft 1 in (1.85 m)
- Listed weight: 240 lb (109 kg)

Career information
- High school: Miami Carol City Senior (Miami Gardens, Florida)
- College: Louisville (2018–2022)
- NFL draft: 2023: 5th round, 136th overall pick

Career history
- Jacksonville Jaguars (2023–2025); Atlanta Falcons (2026–present)

Awards and highlights
- First-team All-ACC (2022); Second-team All-ACC (2021)

Career NFL statistics as of 2025
- Total tackles: 28
- Stats at Pro Football Reference

Yasir Abdullah (born April 12, 2000) is an American professional football linebacker for the Atlanta Falcons of the National Football League (NFL). He played college football for the Louisville Cardinals, and was selected by the Jaguars in the fifth round of the 2023 NFL draft.

== Early life ==
Abdullah is the son of former Florida linebacker Xavier McCray. Abdullah attended Miami Carol City Senior High School in Miami Gardens, Florida. During his high school football career, he had 137 tackles and 20 sacks. He committed to the University of Louisville to play college football.

== College career ==
In 2018, Abdullah played in 11 games and had eight tackles as a true freshman at Louisville. In 2019, he started eight of 13 games, recording 45 tackles, one sack, and one interception. He started seven of 11 games in 2020, finishing with 33 tackles and three sacks. In 2021, Abdullah led Louisville in sacks (10) and had 61 tackles. He returned to Louisville in 2022 rather than enter the 2022 NFL draft. He finished the year with 63 tackles, 9.5 sacks and two interceptions.

== Professional career ==
Pre-draft measurables
| Height | Weight | Arm length | Hand span | Wingspan | 40-yard dash | 10-yard split | 20-yard split | 20-yard shuttle | Three-cone drill | Vertical jump | Broad jump | Bench press |
|---|---|---|---|---|---|---|---|---|---|---|---|---|
| 6 ft 0 5/8 in (1.84 m) | 237 lb (108 kg) | 32 3/8 in (0.82 m) | 9 1/4 in (0.23 m) | 6 ft 7 1/8 in (2.01 m) | 4.47 s | 1.56 s | 2.60 s | 4.33 s | 7.00 s | 36.5 in (0.93 m) | 10 ft 9 in (3.28 m) | 23 reps |
All values from NFL Combine/Pro Day

=== Jacksonville Jaguars ===
The Jacksonville Jaguars selected Abdullah in the fifth round, 136th overall, of the 2023 NFL draft. As a rookie, he appeared in four games.

On August 30, 2026, the Jaguars waived Abdullah as a part of final roster cuts.

=== Atlanta Falcons ===
On August 31, 2026, Abdullah was claimed off waivers by the Atlanta Falcons. On October 10, 2026, Abdullah was placed on Injured reserve list with a hamstring injury. On November 7th, he was activated from injured reserve.
