= Myles Murphy (American football) =

American football player (born 2002)

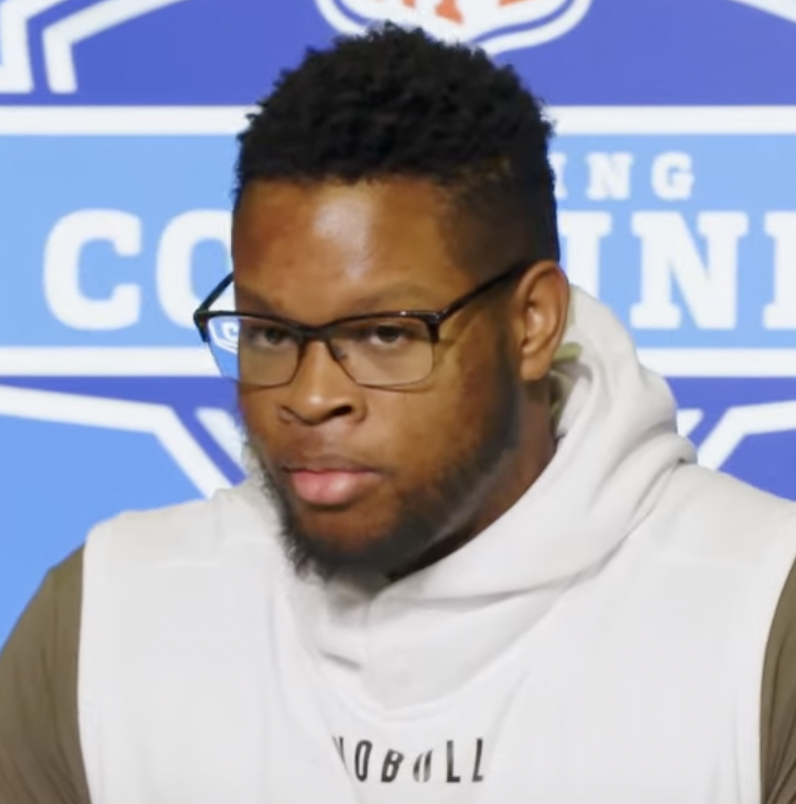
- Murphy at the 2023 NFL Combine

No. 99 – Cincinnati Bengals
- Position: Defensive end
- Roster status: Active

Personal information
- Born: January 3, 2002 (age 24); Marietta, Georgia, U.S.
- Listed height: 6 ft 5 in (1.96 m)
- Listed weight: 275 lb (125 kg)

Career information
- High school: Hillgrove (Powder Springs, Georgia)
- College: Clemson (2020–2022)
- NFL draft: 2023: 1st round, 28th overall pick

Career history
- Cincinnati Bengals (2023–present)

Awards and highlights
- First-team All-ACC (2022); Second-team All-ACC (2021)

Career NFL statistics as of Week 7, 2026
- Total tackles: 100
- Sacks: 10
- Forced fumbles: 1
- Fumble recoveries: 1
- Pass deflections: 4
- Stats at Pro Football Reference

Myles Murphy (born January 3, 2002) is an American professional football defensive end for the Cincinnati Bengals of the National Football League (NFL). He played college football for the Clemson Tigers and was selected by the Bengals in the first round of the 2023 NFL draft.

== Early life ==
Murphy attended Hillgrove High School in Powder Springs, Georgia. As a senior, he had 53 tackles and 10.5 sacks. Murphy played in the 2020 All-American Bowl. A five-star recruit, he committed to Clemson University to play college football.

== College career ==
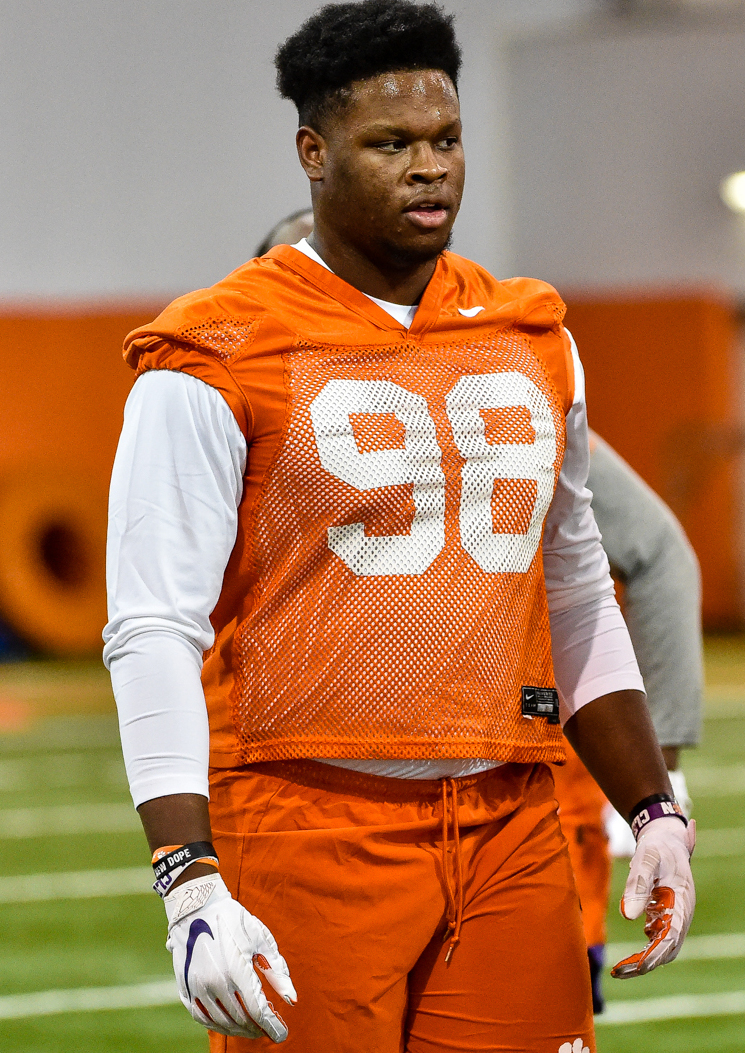
Murphy with Clemson in 2020

Murphy was an immediate contributor as a freshman at Clemson in 2020, recording seven tackles and two sacks in his first game, ending with four sacks, 41 tackles, and three forced fumbles for the season. As a sophomore in 2021, he recorded eight sacks, 38 tackles, and two forced fumbles. Murphy finished his college career with 116 tackles, 36 tackles for loss, 18.5 sacks, and 6 forced fumbles.

== Professional career ==
Pre-draft measurables
| Height | Weight | Arm length | Hand span | Wingspan | 40-yard dash | 10-yard split | 20-yard split | 20-yard shuttle | Three-cone drill | Vertical jump | Bench press |
|---|---|---|---|---|---|---|---|---|---|---|---|
| 6 ft 4 3/4 in (1.95 m) | 268 lb (122 kg) | 33 3/4 in (0.86 m) | 8 1/2 in (0.22 m) | 6 ft 9 1/8 in (2.06 m) | 4.53 s | 1.59 s | 2.62 s | 4.29 s | 7.21 s | 31.0 in (0.79 m) | 25 reps |
All values from NFL Combine/Pro Day

Murphy was selected by the Cincinnati Bengals in the first round (28th overall) of the 2023 NFL draft. He began his rookie season as the third left defensive end behind Sam Hubbard and Cameron Sample on the depth chart. He recorded his first sack in a week 4, a 27–3 loss to the Tennessee Titans. He appeared in all 17 games as a rookie in the 2023 season. He finished with three sacks and 20 total tackles (ten solo).

Murphy began the 2024 season on injured reserve with a knee injury. He was activated on October 4.

On April 30, 2026, the Bengals declined the fifth-year option on Murphy's contract, making him a free agent after the 2026 season.

== NFL career statistics ==
Legend
| **Bold** | Career high |

=== Regular season ===
| Year | Team | Games | | Tackles | | | | | Fumbles | | | | Interceptions | | | |
| Year | Team | GP | GS | Cmb | Solo | Ast | Sck | TFL | FF | FR | Yds | TD | Int | Yds | TD | PD |
|---|---|---|---|---|---|---|---|---|---|---|---|---|---|---|---|---|
| 2023 | CIN | 17 | 0 | 20 | 10 | 10 | 3.0 | 3 | — | — | — | — | — | — | — | — |
| 2024 | CIN | 13 | 0 | 20 | 11 | 9 | 0.0 | 1 | — | — | – | – | — | — | — | 1 |
| 2025 | CIN | 17 | 10 | **52** | **28** | **24** | **5.5** | **6** | — | **1** | – | – | — | — | — | **3** |
| Career | | 47 | 10 | 92 | 49 | 43 | 8.5 | 10 | — | 1 | — | — | — | — | — | 4 |
