= Cory Durden =

American football player (born 1999)

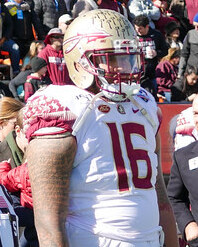
- Durden with Florida State at the 2019 Sun Bowl

No. 94 – New England Patriots
- Position: Nose tackle
- Roster status: Active

Personal information
- Born: January 26, 1999 (age 27); Newberry, Florida, U.S.
- Listed height: 6 ft 4 in (1.93 m)
- Listed weight: 305 lb (138 kg)

Career information
- High school: Newberry
- College: Florida State (2018–2020); NC State (2021–2022)
- NFL draft: 2023: undrafted

Career history
- Detroit Lions (2023)*; Los Angeles Rams (2023–2024); New York Giants (2024); New England Patriots (2025–present)
- * Offseason or practice squad member only

Awards and highlights
- First-team All-ACC (2021); Third-team All-ACC (2022)

Career NFL statistics as of Week 1, 2026
- Total tackles: 45
- Stats at Pro Football Reference

Cory Durden (born January 26, 1999) is an American professional football defensive end for the New England Patriots of the National Football League (NFL). He played college football for the Florida State Seminoles and NC State Wolfpack.

== Early life ==
Durden grew up in Newberry, Florida and attended Newberry High School. In his senior season, he had 52 tackles, 18 going for a loss, 6 sacks, 3 fumble recoveries, 2 forced fumbles, and a blocked field goal. He also added 22 catches for 229 yards and 3 touchdowns as a tight end on offense. Durden was named the Florida Athletic Coaches Association's District 7 Player of the Year and The Sun's Small School Athletes of the Year. On February 20, 2016, Durden committed to play football at Florida State University.

== College career ==
Durden played three years at Florida State. In his time with the Seminoles he posted 68 tackles, 13.5 going for a loss, 7.5 sacks, 3 pass deflections, and 2 forced fumbles. His best season for the Seminoles occurred during the 2019 season where he totaled 39 tackles, 6.5 for loss, 5 sacks, 2 pass deflections, and a forced fumble. After the 2020 season concluded, Durden decided to transfer to NC State. Durden played at NC State for 2 years, in those years he totaled 58 tackles, 7.5 going for a loss, 3.5 sacks, and a pass deflection. His best year for the Wolfpack happened during the 2021 season where he put up 31 tackles, 4.5 being for a loss, and 3.5 sacks. For his efforts he was named to the First team All-Atlantic Coast Conference (ACC). In 2022, he was named Third team All-ACC after notching 27 tackles, 2.5 going for a loss, and a pass defelction.

On December 9, Durden declared for the NFL draft.

== Professional career ==
Pre-draft measurables
Height	Weight	Arm length	Hand span	Wingspan	40-yard dash	10-yard split	20-yard split	20-yard shuttle	Three-cone drill	Vertical jump	Broad jump	Bench press
6 ft 4 in (1.93 m)	290 lb (132 kg)	33 1/2 in (0.85 m)	10 1/8 in (0.26 m)	6 ft 10 1/8 in (2.09 m)	5.22 s	1.90 s	2.89 s	4.80 s	7.56 s	31.0 in (0.79 m)	9 ft 2 in (2.79 m)	16 reps
All values from Pro Day

=== Detroit Lions ===
After not being selected in the 2023 NFL draft, Durden signed with the Detroit Lions as an undrafted free agent. He was waived on August 29, 2023.

=== Los Angeles Rams ===
On September 19, 2023, Durden signed with the practice squad of the Los Angeles Rams. He was promoted to the active roster on October 19. Durden was waived by the Rams on November 7, but re-signed with the practice squad the next day. He signed a reserve/future contract on January 15, 2024.

Durden was waived on August 28, 2024, and re-signed to the practice squad.

=== New York Giants ===
On December 2, 2024, Durden was signed by the New York Giants off of the Rams' practice squad.

On August 26, 2025, Durden was waived by the Giants as part of final roster cuts.

=== New England Patriots ===
On August 28, 2025, Durden signed with the New England Patriots practice squad. He was promoted to the active roster on September 6. He started in Super Bowl LX, a 29–13 loss to the Seattle Seahawks.

== NFL career statistics ==
Legend
**Bold**	Career high

=== Regular season ===
Year	Team	Games		Tackles					Interceptions						Fumbles				
Year	Team	GP	GS	Cmb	Solo	Ast	Sck	TFL	Int	Yds	Avg	Lng	TD	PD	FF	Fmb	FR	Yds	TD
2023	LAR	4	0	3	1	2	0.0	0	0	0	0.0	0	0	0	0	0	0	0	0
2024	NYG	4	0	10	4	6	0.0	1	0	0	0.0	0	0	0	0	0	0	0	0
2025	NE	17	4	**30**	**10**	**20**	0.0	**5**	0	0	0.0	0	0	0	0	0	0	0	0
Career		25	4	43	15	28	0.0	6	0	0	0.0	0	0	0	0	0	0	0	0

=== Postseason ===
Year	Team	Games		Tackles					Interceptions						Fumbles				
Year	Team	GP	GS	Cmb	Solo	Ast	Sck	TFL	Int	Yds	Avg	Lng	TD	PD	FF	Fmb	FR	Yds	TD
2025	NE	4	2	4	0	4	0.0	0	0	0	0.0	0	0	0	0	0	0	0	0
Career		4	2	4	0	4	0.0	0	0	0	0.0	0	0	0	0	0	0	0	0
