= Jordan McFadden =

American football player (born 1999)

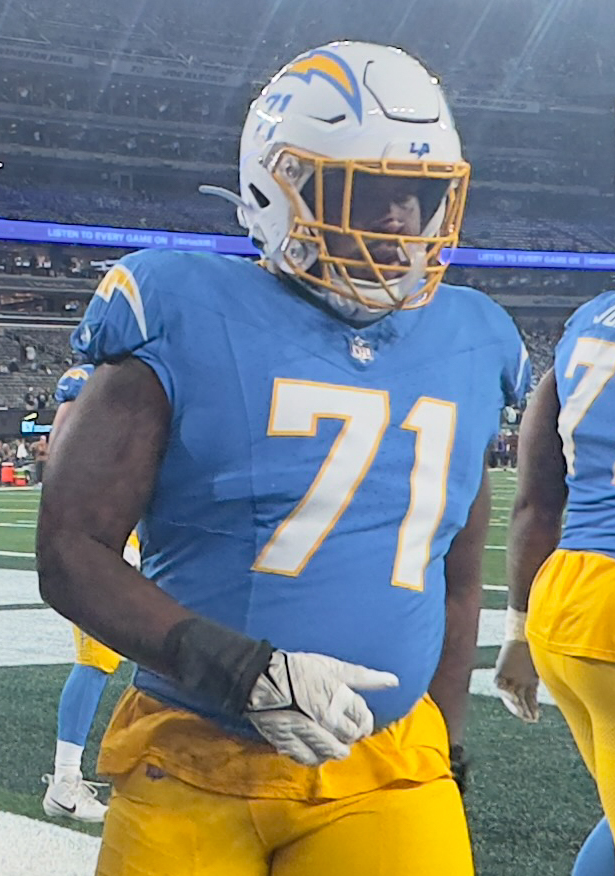
- McFadden with the Los Angeles Chargers in 2023

No. 74 – Chicago Bears
- Position: Offensive guard
- Roster status: Active

Personal information
- Born: November 16, 1999 (age 26); Spartanburg, South Carolina, U.S.
- Listed height: 6 ft 2 in (1.88 m)
- Listed weight: 306 lb (139 kg)

Career information
- High school: Dorman (Roebuck, South Carolina)
- College: Clemson (2018–2022)
- NFL draft: 2023: 5th round, 156th overall pick

Career history
- Los Angeles Chargers (2023–2024); Chicago Bears (2025–present)

Awards and highlights
- CFP national champion (2018); Jacobs Blocking Trophy (2022); First-team All-ACC (2022); Second-team All-ACC (2021)

Career NFL statistics as of Week 17, 2025
- Games played: 19
- Games started: 2
- Stats at Pro Football Reference

Jordan McFadden (born November 16, 1999) is an American professional football offensive guard for the Chicago Bears of the National Football League (NFL). He played college football for the Clemson Tigers, and was selected by the Los Angeles Chargers in the fifth round of the 2023 NFL draft.

== Early life ==
McFadden grew up in Spartanburg, South Carolina and attended Dorman High School.

== College career ==
McFadden played in three games during his true freshman season at Clemson before redshirting the year. He appeared in 14 games as a redshirt freshman. McFadden was named the Tigers' starting right tackle going into his redshirt sophomore season. He was named second-team All-Atlantic Coast Conference (ACC) after his redshirt junior after starting 13 games at left tackle. McFadden was awarded the Jacobs Blocking Trophy as the best blocker in the ACC and was named first team All-ACC at the end of his redshirt senior season.

== Professional career ==
Pre-draft measurables
Height	Weight	Arm length	Hand span	Wingspan	40-yard dash	10-yard split	20-yard split	20-yard shuttle	Three-cone drill	Vertical jump	Bench press
6 ft 2 1/4 in (1.89 m)	303 lb (137 kg)	34 in (0.86 m)	9 1/2 in (0.24 m)	6 ft 9 in (2.06 m)	4.99 s	1.74 s	2.92 s	4.81 s	7.70 s	28.5 in (0.72 m)	24 reps
All values from NFL Combine/Pro Day

=== Los Angeles Chargers ===
McFadden was selected by the Los Angeles Chargers in the fifth round, 156th overall, of the 2023 NFL draft. As a rookie, he appeared in 12 games and started two in the 2023 season.

On January 9, 2025, McFadden was waived by the Chargers, having played only one game for the team during the regular season.

=== Chicago Bears ===
On January 10, 2025, McFadden was claimed off waivers by the Chicago Bears. He was waived on August 26 as part of final roster cuts and re-signed to the practice squad the next day. On December 6, McFadden was promoted to the active roster. After playing just two snaps in the regular season, McFadden started the Bears' divisional playoff game against the Los Angeles Rams at left guard due to injuries. Despite McFadden's lack of starting experience, the Chicago Sun-Times noted the move "didn't even seem to hurt the operation much" as the offensive line succeeded in protecting quarterback Caleb Williams while struggling in short-yardage situations against a stronger Rams defense.

On March 12, 2026, McFadden re-signed with the Bears on a one-year contract.
