= Erick Hallett =

American football player (born 2000)

No. 41 – Tennessee Titans
- Position: Safety
- Roster status: Practice squad

Personal information
- Born: April 24, 2000 (age 26); Cypress, Texas, U.S.
- Listed height: 5 ft 11 in (1.80 m)
- Listed weight: 200 lb (91 kg)

Career information
- High school: Cy-Fair (Cypress)
- College: Pittsburgh (2018–2022)
- NFL draft: 2023: 6th round, 208th overall pick

Career history
- Jacksonville Jaguars (2023)*; Detroit Lions (2024–2025); Tennessee Titans (2025–present)
- * Offseason or practice squad member only

Awards and highlights
- Second-team All-ACC (2022)

Career NFL statistics as of 2025
- Tackles: 22
- Pass Break-ups: 8
- Stats at Pro Football Reference

Erick Paul Hallett II (born April 24, 2000) is an American professional football safety for the Tennessee Titans of the National Football League (NFL). He played college football for the Pittsburgh Panthers.

== Early life ==
Hallett was born on April 24, 2000, and grew up in Cypress, Texas. He attended Cy-Fair High School, playing as a cornerback, wide receiver and return specialist and helping them win the Class 6A championship with a 15–0 record during his senior year. He posted 38 tackles and six interceptions during his senior season, earning first-team all-district honors. Hallett committed to play college football at Pittsburgh over various other offers.

== College career ==
As a true freshman at Pittsburgh in 2018, Hallett redshirted. The following year, he appeared in 12 games, starting one, and recorded 14 tackles with two pass breakups. In 2020, he played ten games, starting the final four, and tallied 30 tackles, two of which were for a loss, four pass breakups and two interceptions. Hallett was named honorable mention all-conference in 2021 after starting all 14 games and making 70 tackles, 2.5 TFLs, nine pass breakups, three interceptions and two forced fumbles. In his final year, he started all 13 games and earned second-team all-conference honors while posting 54 tackles, four TFLs and nine pass breakups with two forced fumbles, additionally being a semifinalist for the Jim Thorpe Award, given to the best defensive back nationally.

== Professional career ==
Pre-draft measurables
| Height | Weight | Arm length | Hand span | Wingspan | 40-yard dash | 10-yard split | 20-yard split | 20-yard shuttle | Three-cone drill | Vertical jump | Broad jump | Bench press |
|---|---|---|---|---|---|---|---|---|---|---|---|---|
| 5 ft 9 1/2 in (1.77 m) | 191 lb (87 kg) | 30 1/2 in (0.77 m) | 9 5/8 in (0.24 m) | 6 ft 1 1/2 in (1.87 m) | 4.50 s | 1.57 s | 2.60 s | 4.11 s | 6.84 s | 37.5 in (0.95 m) | 9 ft 11 in (3.02 m) | 13 reps |
All values from Pro Day

=== Jacksonville Jaguars ===
Hallett was selected by the Jacksonville Jaguars in the sixth round (208th overall) of the 2023 NFL draft. He was waived on August 29, 2023, and re-signed to the practice squad.

Hallett signed a reserve/future contract with Jacksonville on January 8, 2024. On August 27, Hallett was waived by the Jaguars.

=== Detroit Lions ===
Hallett was signed to the practice squad of the Detroit Lions on August 29, 2024. He was released on November 20. On December 11, the Lions re–signed Hallett to their practice squad. He signed a reserve/future contract with Detroit on January 20, 2025.

Hallett was waived by the Lions on August 26, 2025 as part of final roster cuts, and re-signed to the practice squad. On October 11, he was signed to the active roster.

On October 20, 2025, Hallett started his first NFL game in a 24-9 win against the Tampa Bay Buccaneers. During the contest he had a team high 8 total tackles and played 62 defensive snaps in replacement of starting safeties Kerby Joseph, who was inactive due to injury and Brian Branch who was suspended after a brief brawl ensued after a loss against the Kansas City Chiefs the week prior, a game Hallett had made his NFL debut in. He was waived on November 22, and re-signed to the practice squad.

=== Tennessee Titans ===
On December 16, 2025, Hallett was signed by the Tennessee Titans off of the Lions' practice squad.

On August 31, 2026, Hallett was waived by the Titans. On September 2, Tennessee re–signed Hallett to their practice squad. He was promoted to the active roster on September 26. He was waived on October 17 and was re-signed to the practice squad three days later.
