= Nick Jackson (American football) =

American football player (born 2001)

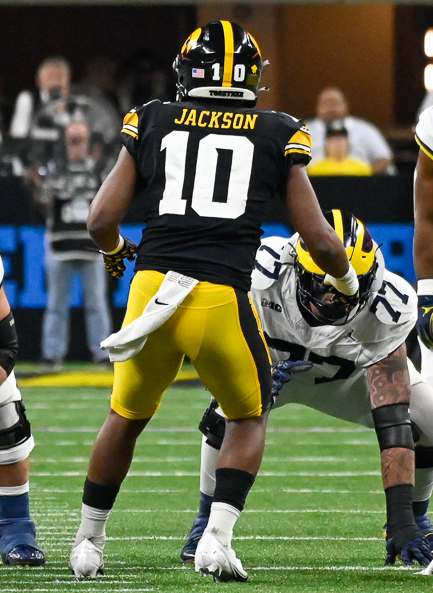

Profile
- Position: Linebacker

Personal information
- Born: January 5, 2001 (age 25); Atlanta, Georgia, U.S.
- Listed height: 6 ft 0 in (1.83 m)
- Listed weight: 235 lb (107 kg)

Career information
- High school: The Lovett School (Atlanta)
- College: Virginia (2019–2022); Iowa (2023–2024)
- NFL draft: 2025: undrafted

Career history
- Tampa Bay Buccaneers (2025)

Awards and highlights
- Second-team All-ACC (2022); Third-team All-Big Ten (2023)

Career NFL statistics as of Week 10, 2025
- Games played: 1
- Stats at Pro Football Reference

Nick Jackson (born January 5, 2001) is an American professional football linebacker. He played college football for the Virginia Cavaliers and Iowa Hawkeyes.

Jackson is tied with Erick Hicks Jr. of Tulane for the third-most college football games played in Division I history with 67.

== Early life ==
Jackson attended The Lovett School in Atlanta, Georgia. He was rated as the 24th best linebacker and committed to play college football for the Virginia Cavaliers over offers from Duke, Northwestern, and Texas A&M.

== College career ==
=== Virginia ===
As a freshman in 2019, Jackson tallied 28 tackles with one being for a loss, and half a sack. In week 8 of the 2020 season, he notched a career 16 tackles in a loss to Miami. Jackson finished the 2020 season with 105 tackles with six going for a loss, two and a half sacks, two pass deflections, a forced fumble, and two receptions for 34 yards. In 2021, he notched 117 tackles with six being for a loss, two and a half sacks, and two pass deflections. In week 9 of the 2022 season versus Miami, Jackson recorded 14 tackles with half a tackle being for a loss, and a pass deflection, and he was named the Atlantic Coast Conference (ACC) linebacker of the week. He finished the season with 104 tackles and five sacks, earning second-team all-ACC. After the conclusion of the 2022 season, Jackson entered the NCAA transfer portal.

=== Iowa ===
Jackson transferred to play for the Iowa Hawkeyes to finish out his career. In week 2 of the 2023 season, versus Iowa State, he totaled nine tackles in a win. In week 5, Jackson was named the Big Ten Conference co-defensive player of the week in a 26-16 win over Michigan State. For his performance on the 2023 season, he was named third-team all-Big Ten.

== Professional career ==
Pre-draft measurables
Height	Weight	Arm length	Hand span	Wingspan	40-yard dash	10-yard split	20-yard split	20-yard shuttle	Three-cone drill	Vertical jump	Broad jump	Bench press
6 ft 0 3/4 in (1.85 m)	228 lb (103 kg)	31 1/4 in (0.79 m)	9 1/2 in (0.24 m)	6 ft 3 in (1.91 m)	4.75 s	1.65 s	2.74 s	4.44 s	7.10 s	34.5 in (0.88 m)	9 ft 5 in (2.87 m)	16 reps
All values from Pro Day

On May 12, 2025, after going unselected in the 2025 NFL draft, Jackson signed with the Tampa Bay Buccaneers as an undrafted free agent. He was waived on August 26 as part of final roster cuts and subsequently re-signed to the practice squad the next day. Jackson was promoted to the active roster on December 9. He was waived on December 19 and re-signed to the practice squad. On January 8, 2026, Jackson signed a reserve/futures contract with Tampa Bay.

On August 30, 2026, Jackson was waived by the Buccaneers.
