= Trenton Simpson =

American football player (born 2001)

- Simpson in 2026

No. 32 – Baltimore Ravens
- Position: Linebacker
- Roster status: Active

Personal information
- Born: June 14, 2001 (age 25); Charlotte, North Carolina, U.S.
- Listed height: 6 ft 2 in (1.88 m)
- Listed weight: 242 lb (110 kg)

Career information
- High school: Mallard Creek (Charlotte)
- College: Clemson (2020–2022)
- NFL draft: 2023: 3rd round, 86th overall pick

Career history
- Baltimore Ravens (2023–present)

Awards and highlights
- Third-team All-ACC (2022)

Career NFL statistics as of Week 9, 2026
- Total tackles: 209
- Sacks: 6
- Fumble recoveries: 3
- Pass deflections: 6
- Interceptions: 1
- Stats at Pro Football Reference

Trenton Simpson (born June 14, 2001) is an American professional football linebacker for the Baltimore Ravens of the National Football League (NFL). He played college football for the Clemson Tigers.

== Early life ==
Simpson attended Mallard Creek High School in Charlotte, North Carolina. He played both linebacker and running back in high school. He was selected to play in the 2020 Under Armour All-America Game. A five-star recruit, Simpson originally committed to Auburn University to play college football but switched to Clemson University.

== College career ==
As a true freshman at Clemson in 2020, Simpson played in 12 games with three starts and had 28 tackles and four sacks. In 2021, he started 12 games and recorded 65 tackles along with six sacks.

== Professional career ==
Pre-draft measurables
Height	Weight	Arm length	Hand span	Wingspan	40-yard dash	10-yard split	20-yard split	20-yard shuttle	Three-cone drill	Vertical jump	Broad jump	Bench press
6 ft 2 3/8 in (1.89 m)	235 lb (107 kg)	32 3/8 in (0.82 m)	10 1/4 in (0.26 m)	6 ft 5 1/2 in (1.97 m)	4.43 s	1.55 s	2.55 s	4.25 s	7.07 s	40.5 in (1.03 m)	9 ft 10 in (3.00 m)	25 reps
All values from NFL Combine/Pro Day

Simpson was selected by the Baltimore Ravens in the third round, 86th overall, of the 2023 NFL draft. He recorded his first NFL sack in Week 18 against the Steelers. As a rookie, he appeared in 15 regular season games and two postseason games for the Ravens.

== NFL career statistics ==
Legend
**Bold**	Career high

=== Regular season ===
Year	Team	Games		Tackles					Interceptions						Fumbles				
Year	Team	GP	GS	Cmb	Solo	Ast	Sck	TFL	Int	Yds	Avg	Lng	TD	PD	FF	Fum	FR	Yds	TD
2023	BAL	15	0	13	10	3	1.0	2	0	0	0.0	0	0	0	0	0	1	10	0
2024	BAL	17	13	73	40	33	1.5	5	0	0	0.0	0	0	4	0	0	1	0	0
2025	BAL	17	6	66	34	32	2.5	4	0	0	0.0	0	0	1	0	0	0	0	0
Career		49	19	152	84	68	5.0	11	0	0	0.0	0	0	5	0	0	2	10	0

=== Postseason ===
Year	Team	Games		Tackles					Interceptions						Fumbles				
Year	Team	GP	GS	Cmb	Solo	Ast	Sck	TFL	Int	Yds	Avg	Lng	TD	PD	FF	Fum	FR	Yds	TD
2023	BAL	2	0	1	0	1	0.0	0	0	0	0.0	0	0	0	0	0	0	0	0
2024	BAL	2	0	1	0	1	0.0	0	0	0	0.0	0	0	0	0	0	0	0	0
Career		4	0	2	0	2	0.0	0	0	0	0.0	0	0	0	0	0	0	0	0
