= Will Mallory =

American football player (born 1999)

No. 86 – Indianapolis Colts
- Position: Tight end
- Roster status: Active

Personal information
- Born: June 22, 1999 (age 27); Jacksonville, Florida, U.S.
- Listed height: 6 ft 4 in (1.93 m)
- Listed weight: 239 lb (108 kg)

Career information
- High school: Providence School (Jacksonville)
- College: Miami (FL) (2018–2022)
- NFL draft: 2023: 5th round, 162nd overall pick

Career history
- Indianapolis Colts (2023–present)

Awards and highlights
- Second-team All-ACC (2022)

Career NFL statistics as of Week 10, 2026
- Receptions: 25
- Receiving yards: 272
- Stats at Pro Football Reference

William Mallory (born June 22, 1999) is an American professional football tight end for the Indianapolis Colts of the National Football League (NFL). He played college football for the Miami Hurricanes.

== Early life ==
Mallory grew up in Jacksonville, Florida and attended the Providence School. He caught 46 passes for 900 yards and 12 touchdowns as a junior. Mallory missed multiple games due to injury as a senior and finished the season with 21 catches for 364 yards and three touchdowns. Mallory was rated a four-star recruit and committed to play college football at Miami over offers from Georgia, Michigan, Clemson, Alabama, Auburn, Florida, Louisville, Notre Dame, Ohio State, and USC.

== College career ==
Mallory played in ten games for the Miami Hurricanes as a freshman and caught five passes for 37 yards. He played in all 13 of the team's games with eight starts during his sophomore season and finished the year with 16 receptions for 293 yards with two touchdowns. Mallory caught 22 passes for 329 yards with four touchdowns as a junior. He finished the 2021 season with 30 receptions for 347 yards and four touchdowns. Mallory considered declaring for the 2021 NFL draft, but opted to use the extra year of eligibility granted to college athletes in 2020 due to the COVID-19 pandemic and returned to Miami for a fifth season.

== Professional career ==
Pre-draft measurables
Height	Weight	Arm length	Hand span	Wingspan	40-yard dash	10-yard split	20-yard split	20-yard shuttle	Three-cone drill	Vertical jump	Broad jump	Bench press
6 ft 4 1/2 in (1.94 m)	239 lb (108 kg)	32 1/4 in (0.82 m)	9 3/8 in (0.24 m)	6 ft 6 1/4 in (1.99 m)	4.54 s	1.59 s	2.61 s	4.40 s	7.18 s	36.5 in (0.93 m)	10 ft 1 in (3.07 m)	20 reps
All values from NFL Combine/Pro Day

Mallory was selected by the Indianapolis Colts in the fifth round, 162nd overall, in the 2023 NFL draft. He appeared in 12 games and started two as a rookie. He finished with 18 receptions for 207 yards.

On August 30, 2026, Mallory was placed on injured reserve due to a thumb injury. He was activated on October 17.

== Personal life ==
Mallory's father, Mike Mallory, is a longtime football coach who formerly was an assistant special teams coach for the Denver Broncos. His grandfather, Bill Mallory, served as the head football coach at Miami of Ohio, Colorado, Northern Illinois, and Indiana. Mallory's two uncles, Curt Mallory and Doug Mallory, are also football coaches.
