= Brandon Hill (American football) =

American football player (born 2000)

Profile
- Position: Safety

Personal information
- Born: September 6, 2000 (age 26); Apopka, Florida, U.S.
- Listed height: 5 ft 11 in (1.80 m)
- Listed weight: 195 lb (88 kg)

Career information
- High school: Wekiva (Apopka)
- College: Pittsburgh (2019–2022)
- NFL draft: 2023: 7th round, 248th overall pick

Career history
- Houston Texans (2023–2025); Las Vegas Raiders (2025)*; Houston Texans (2025)*; Chicago Bears (2026)*; Pittsburgh Steelers (2026)*
- * Offseason or practice squad member only

Awards and highlights
- Second-team All-ACC (2021)
- Stats at Pro Football Reference

Brandon Hill (born September 6, 2000) is an American professional football safety. He played college football for the Pittsburgh Panthers.

== Early life ==
Hill grew up in Apopka, Florida and attended Wekiva High School. He was rated a three-star recruit and committed to play college football at Pittsburgh from 23 total scholarship offers.

== College career ==
Hill played in four games during his true freshman season while preserving a redshirt on the year. He made 27 tackles with two forced fumbles and one interception as a redshirt freshman. Hill was named second team All-Atlantic Coast Conference (ACC) as a redshirt sophomore. He had 67 tackles and two passes broken up during his redshirt junior season. After the regular season, Hill announced he would forgo playing in the 2022 Sun Bowl and declared for the 2023 NFL draft.

== Professional career ==
Pre-draft measurables
Height	Weight	Arm length	Hand span	Wingspan	40-yard dash	10-yard split	20-yard split	20-yard shuttle	Three-cone drill	Vertical jump	Broad jump	Bench press
5 ft 10 3/8 in (1.79 m)	193 lb (88 kg)	30 3/4 in (0.78 m)	9 1/2 in (0.24 m)	6 ft 2 1/8 in (1.88 m)	4.43 s	1.50 s	2.51 s	4.12 s	6.88 s	35.5 in (0.90 m)	10 ft 3 in (3.12 m)	15 reps
All values from NFL Combine/Pro Day

=== Houston Texans ===
Hill was selected by the Houston Texans in the seventh round, 248th overall, of the 2023 NFL draft. He was waived on August 29, 2023, and re-signed to the practice squad. Hill signed a reserve/future contract with Houston on January 22, 2024.

On August 25, 2024, it was announced that Hill would miss the entirety of the 2024 season after suffering a right knee injury in the team's preseason finale.

The Texans waived Hill on March 17, 2025, after a failed physical. He was re-signed to the team's practice squad on December 16. Hill was released by the Texans on December 23.

=== Las Vegas Raiders ===
On December 30, 2025, Hill was signed to the Las Vegas Raiders' practice squad.

=== Houston Texans (second stint) ===
On January 14, 2026, Hill was re-signed to the Houston Texans practice squad.

=== Chicago Bears ===
On August 8, 2026, Hill signed with the Chicago Bears. He was released by the Bears following the signing of Wesley French on August 11.

=== Pittsburgh Steelers ===
On August 25, 2026, Hill signed with the Pittsburgh Steelers. He was waived by Pittsburgh three days later as a part of preliminary roster cuts.
