= Shaka Heyward =

American football player (born 2000)

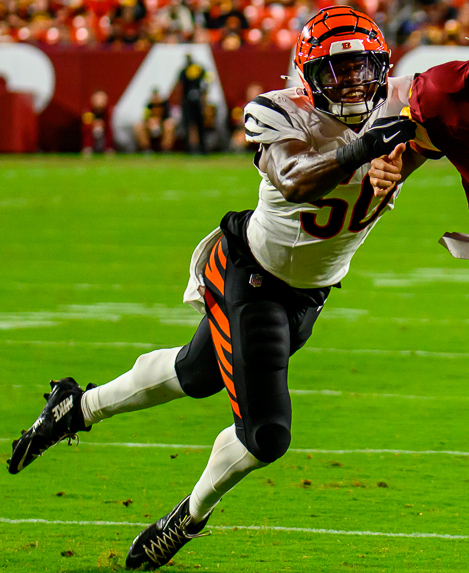
- Heyward with the Cincinnati Bengals in 2025

No. 45 – Miami Dolphins
- Position: Linebacker
- Roster status: Active

Personal information
- Born: April 19, 2000 (age 26); Dacula, Georgia, U.S.
- Listed height: 6 ft 3 in (1.91 m)
- Listed weight: 238 lb (108 kg)

Career information
- High school: Mill Creek (Hoschton, Georgia)
- College: Duke (2018–2022)
- NFL draft: 2023: undrafted

Career history
- Cincinnati Bengals (2023–2026); Miami Dolphins (2026–present)

Career NFL statistics as of 2025
- Total tackles: 22
- Forced fumbles: 1
- Stats at Pro Football Reference

Shaka Heyward (born April 19, 2000) is an American professional football linebacker for the Miami Dolphins of the National Football League (NFL). He played college football for the Duke Blue Devils.

== Early life ==
Heyward was born on April 19, 2000. He comes from an athletic family: his cousins, Cameron and Connor Heyward, both play in the NFL, Cameron for the Pittsburgh Steelers and Connor for the Las Vegas Raiders, while another cousin, Corey, played college basketball, another, Craig Jr., played college football for Middle Tennessee, and Craig Jr.'s father Craig Heyward also played in the NFL. He attended Mill Creek High School in Georgia where he played football as a linebacker. In his last two seasons, he totaled 168 tackles. A three-star prospect, he committed to play college football for the Duke Blue Devils and one of the top-60 ranked outside linebackers nationally.

== College career ==
Heyward redshirted as a freshman at Duke in 2018, appearing in four games. The following year, he appeared in all 12 games, six as a starter, totaling 68 tackles and 6.5 tackles-for-loss (TFLs); he was third for Atlantic Coast Conference (ACC) freshmen in the former while he placed sixth in the latter category. In 2020, he started all 11 games and posted a team-leading 80 tackles with 8.5 TFLs and 3.0 sacks. That year, he received the Vincent Rey Award for best Duke linebacker and the Sonny Falcone Award, "given annually to offensive, defensive, and developmental members for their year-round commitment to strength and conditioning."

In 2021, Heyward was named third-team All-ACC after having started all 12 games and recording a team-leading 98 tackles and 11.5 TFLs. He received the Vincent Rey Award for a second time and also won an award for playing the most snaps for Duke that year. As a senior in 2022, he served as team captain and started all 12 games, recording 93 tackles, six pass breakups and 6.0 TFLs, being named honorable mention All-ACC and the Duke defensive MVP. He concluded his collegiate career having started 41 games, tallying 340 tackles, 32.5 TFLs and 11.5 sacks.

== Professional career ==
Pre-draft measurables
Height	Weight	Arm length	Hand span	Wingspan	40-yard dash	10-yard split	20-yard split	20-yard shuttle	Three-cone drill	Vertical jump	Broad jump	Bench press
6 ft 2 7/8 in (1.90 m)	235 lb (107 kg)	34 in (0.86 m)	9 1/2 in (0.24 m)	6 ft 8 7/8 in (2.05 m)	4.53 s	1.54 s	2.63 s	4.40 s	7.32 s	31.0 in (0.79 m)	9 ft 8 in (2.95 m)	22 reps
All values from NFL Combine

=== Cincinnati Bengals ===
After going unselected in the 2023 NFL draft, Heyward signed with the Cincinnati Bengals as an undrafted free agent. He was waived on August 29, 2023, then re-signed to the practice squad the following day. He signed a reserve/future contract with Cincinnati after the season on January 8, 2024. He was waived again on August 27, then re-signed to the practice squad the following day. He was elevated to the active roster for the team's Week 11 game against the Los Angeles Chargers and made his NFL debut in the game, appearing on 24 special teams snaps. He was signed to the active roster on December 2.

Heyward began the 2025 season as one of Cincinnati's reserve linebackers, logging 10 combined tackles over eight appearances. In Week 8 against the New York Jets, Heyward suffered a hairline fracture in his fibula, necessitating an injured reserve placement on October 28, 2025. He was activated on December 12, ahead of the team's Week 15 matchup against the Baltimore Ravens.

Heyward signed a one-year contract extension with Cincinnati on January 5, 2026. On August 30, Heyward was waived by the Bengals as a part of final roster cuts; he was re-signed to the team's practice squad the next day.

=== Miami Dolphins ===
On September 29, 2026, Heyward was signed by the Miami Dolphins off the Bengals practice squad.
