= Josh DeBerry =

American football player (born 2001)

Profile
- Position: Cornerback

Personal information
- Born: August 10, 2001 (age 25); Grosse Pointe Park, Michigan, U.S.
- Listed height: 5 ft 11 in (1.80 m)
- Listed weight: 184 lb (83 kg)

Career information
- High school: De La Salle (Warren, Michigan)
- College: Boston College (2019–2022); Texas A&M (2023)
- NFL draft: 2024: undrafted

Career history
- Dallas Cowboys (2024)*; Hamilton Tiger-Cats (2025)*
- * Offseason or practice squad member only
- Stats at Pro Football Reference

Joshua Michael DeBerry (born August 10, 2001) is an American professional football cornerback. He played college football for the Boston College Eagles and the Texas A&M Aggies.

== Early life ==
DeBerry grew up in Grosse Pointe Park, Michigan and attended De La Salle Collegiate High School. In his senior season, DeBerry notched 36 tackles with two and a half being for a loss, seven pass deflections, and two interceptions, while also adding 30 receptions for 687 yards and eight touchdowns, and rushing for 123 yards and a touchdown. Coming out of high school, DeBerry was rated as a three-star prospect where he held offers from schools such as Northwestern, Boston College, Buffalo, Wake Forest, Cincinnati, Iowa, Iowa State, Kentucky, and Northwestern. DeBerry ultimately decided to commit to play college football for the Boston College Eagles.

== College career ==
In DeBerry's four years with Boston College, he played in 39 games where he totaled 158 tackles with 14 being for a loss, 19 pass deflections, and four interceptions After the conclusion of the 2022 season, DeBerry decided to enter the NCAA transfer portal.

DeBerry decided to transfer to play for the Texas A&M Aggies. In DeBerry's debut with the Aggies he posted 10 tackles, a sack, a pass deflection, and an interception in a 52-10 win over New Mexico. DeBerry finished the 2023 season posting 39 tackles with four and a half being for a loss, a sack, nine pass deflections, and two interceptions.

== Professional career ==
Pre-draft measurables
Height	Weight	Arm length	Hand span	40-yard dash	10-yard split	20-yard split	20-yard shuttle	Three-cone drill	Vertical jump	Broad jump	Bench press
5 ft 10 7/8 in (1.80 m)	184 lb (83 kg)	29 3/4 in (0.76 m)	8 7/8 in (0.23 m)	4.56 s	1.63 s	2.63 s	4.34 s	7.25 s	32 in (0.81 m)	9 ft 8 in (2.95 m)	17 reps
All values from Pro Day

DeBerry signed with the Dallas Cowboys as an undrafted free agent on May 8, 2024. He was waived on August 26.

DeBerry signed with the Hamilton Tiger-Cats on January 29, 2025. He was released on May 11, 2025.
