= Zion Nelson =

American football player (born 2001)

No. 60 – SMU
- Position: Offensive tackle
- Class: Senior

Personal information
- Born: January 9, 2001 (age 25); Sumter, South Carolina, U.S.
- Listed height: 6 ft 6 in (1.98 m)
- Listed weight: 326 lb (148 kg)

Career information
- High school: Sumter (Sumter, South Carolina)
- College: Miami (2019–2023); SMU (2025–Present)
- Stats at ESPN

Zion Nelson (born January 9, 2001) is an American college football offensive tackle who plays for the SMU Mustangs. He previously played for the Miami Hurricanes from 2019 to 2023.

== Early life ==
Nelson grew up in Sumter, South Carolina and attended Sumter High School. He was initially rated a two-star recruit and committed to play college football at Appalachian State. Nelson's recruitment picked up during his senior season, in which the Fighting Gamecocks rushed for over 2,000 yards and won 10 games, and he flipped his commitment after a late offer from Miami.

== College career ==
Nelson enrolled joined the Miami Hurricanes as an early enrollee. He was named the starting left tackle for the Hurricanes going into his freshman year after performing well in summer training camp. Nelson started all 13 of Miami's games as a freshman and allowed the most sacks of any starting tackle from a Power Five conference. After initially losing his starting job, Nelson regained his spot as the Hurricanes' starting left tackle for the final six games of his sophomore season.

On July 25, 2024, Nelson announced that he would medically retire from football after multiple knee injuries.
