= 2022 Clemson Tigers football team =

American college football season

2022 Clemson Tigers football

ACC champion ACC Atlantic Division champion

ACC Championship, W 39–10 vs. North Carolina

Orange Bowl, L 14–31 vs. Tennessee
- Conference: Atlantic Coast Conference
- Atlantic Division

Ranking
- Coaches: No. 12
- AP: No. 13
- Record: 11–3 (8–0 ACC)
- Head coach: Dabo Swinney (14th full, 15th overall season)
- Offensive coordinator: Brandon Streeter (1st season)
- Offensive scheme: Pro spread
- Defensive coordinator: Wes Goodwin (1st season)
- Co-defensive coordinator: Mickey Conn (1st season)
- Base defense: 4–3 / 4–2–5 hybrid
- Home stadium: Memorial Stadium

Uniform
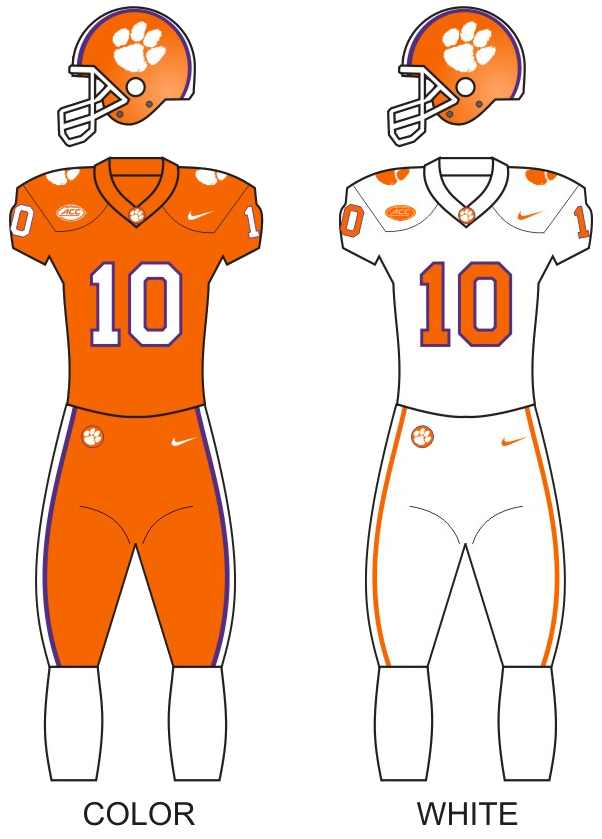

2022 Atlantic Coast Conference football standings
	Conf.			Overall
Team	W		L	W		L
Atlantic Division
No. 13 Clemson xy$	8	–	0	11	–	3
No. 11 Florida State	5	–	3	10	–	3
Louisville	4	–	4	8	–	5
NC State	4	–	4	8	–	5
Syracuse	4	–	4	7	–	6
Wake Forest	3	–	5	8	–	5
Boston College	2	–	6	3	–	9
Coastal Division
North Carolina xy	6	–	2	9	–	5
Duke	5	–	3	9	–	4
No. 22 Pittsburgh	5	–	3	9	–	4
Georgia Tech	4	–	4	5	–	7
Miami (FL)	3	–	5	5	–	7
Virginia	1	–	6	3	–	7
Virginia Tech	1	–	6	3	–	8
Championship: Clemson 39, North Carolina 10
$ – Conference champion; x – Division champion/co-champions; y – Championship game participant; Rankings from AP Poll

The 2022 Clemson Tigers football team represented Clemson University during the 2022 NCAA Division I FBS football season. The Tigers were led by head coach Dabo Swinney, in his 15th year. The Tigers competed as a member of the Atlantic Coast Conference (ACC) and played their home games at Memorial Stadium in Clemson, South Carolina. On November 26, 2022, Clemson's archrival, the South Carolina Gamecocks, defeated Clemson in Memorial Stadium, shattering their nation-leading, 40-game home winning streak dating back to 2016.

== Offseason ==
=== Recruiting ===
Clemson's 2022 class consisted of 20 signees. The class was ranked first in the ACC and tenth best overall by the 247Sports Composite.

College recruiting (2022)
Name	Hometown	School	Height	Weight	Commit date
Keith Adams Jr; RB	Saint George, Utah	Pine View High School	5 ft 10 in (1.78 m)	205 lb (93 kg)	Feb 2, 2022
Keith Adams Jr; RB	Recruit ratings: Rivals: 247Sports: ESPN: (71)				
Sherrod Covil; S	Chesapeake, Virginia	Oscar Smith High School	6 ft 0 in (1.83 m)	185 lb (84 kg)	Jun 17, 2021
Sherrod Covil; S	Recruit ratings: Rivals: 247Sports: ESPN: (82)				
TJ Dudley; LB	Montgomery, Alabama	Montgomery Catholic Preparatory School	6 ft 1 in (1.85 m)	220 lb (100 kg)	Feb 2, 2022
TJ Dudley; LB	Recruit ratings: Rivals: 247Sports: ESPN: (80)				
Kylon Griffin; S	Montgomery, Alabama	Montgomery Catholic Preparatory School	6 ft 1 in (1.85 m)	180 lb (82 kg)	Jan 25, 2022
Kylon Griffin; S	Recruit ratings: Rivals: 247Sports: ESPN: (76)				
Robert Gunn; K	Largo, Florida	Pinellas Park High School	6 ft 2 in (1.88 m)	165 lb (75 kg)	Jun 14, 2021
Robert Gunn; K	Recruit ratings: Rivals: 247Sports: ESPN: (75)				
Cade Klubnik; QB	Austin, Texas	Westlake High School	6 ft 2 in (1.88 m)	186 lb (84 kg)	Mar 2, 2021
Cade Klubnik; QB	Recruit ratings: Rivals: 247Sports: ESPN: (87)				
Jahiem Lawson; DL	Central, South Carolina	D. W. Daniel High School	6 ft 4 in (1.93 m)	230 lb (100 kg)	Jan 28, 2021
Jahiem Lawson; DL	Recruit ratings: Rivals: 247Sports: ESPN: (76)				
Jeadyn Lukus; CB	Mauldin, South Carolina	Mauldin High School	6 ft 2 in (1.88 m)	185 lb (84 kg)	Jul 28, 2021
Jeadyn Lukus; CB	Recruit ratings: Rivals: 247Sports: ESPN: (85)				
Kobe McCloud; LB	Tampa, Florida	Gaither High School	6 ft 1 in (1.85 m)	208 lb (94 kg)	Jan 26, 2022
Kobe McCloud; LB	Recruit ratings: Rivals: 247Sports: ESPN: (73)				
Blake Miller; OT	Strongsville, Ohio	Strongsville High School	6 ft 6 in (1.98 m)	315 lb (143 kg)	Oct 28, 2020
Blake Miller; OT	Recruit ratings: Rivals: 247Sports: ESPN: (81)				
Miles Oliver; CB	Douglasville, Georgia	Douglas County High School	6 ft 0 in (1.83 m)	170 lb (77 kg)	Jan 16, 2022
Miles Oliver; CB	Recruit ratings: Rivals: 247Sports: ESPN: (79)				
Toriano Pride; CB	East St. Louis, Illinois	East St. Louis High School	5 ft 11 in (1.80 m)	185 lb (84 kg)	Jun 18, 2021
Toriano Pride; CB	Recruit ratings: Rivals: 247Sports: ESPN: (83)				
Adam Randall; WR	Myrtle Beach, South Carolina	Myrtle Beach High School	6 ft 3 in (1.91 m)	215 lb (98 kg)	Dec 25, 2020
Adam Randall; WR	Recruit ratings: Rivals: 247Sports: ESPN: (85)				
Collin Sadler; OT	Greenville, South Carolina	Greenville High School	6 ft 5 in (1.96 m)	290 lb (130 kg)	Nov 2, 2020
Collin Sadler; OT	Recruit ratings: Rivals: 247Sports: ESPN: (84)				
Josh Sapp; TE	Greenville, South Carolina	Greenville High School	6 ft 2 in (1.88 m)	230 lb (100 kg)	Oct 19, 2021
Josh Sapp; TE	Recruit ratings: Rivals: 247Sports: ESPN: (75)				
Jackson Smith; P	Saraland, Alabama	Saraland High School	6 ft 5 in (1.96 m)	227 lb (103 kg)	Dec 15, 2021
Jackson Smith; P	Recruit ratings: Rivals: 247Sports: ESPN: (75)				
Caden Story; DL	Lanett, Alabama	Lanett High School	6 ft 3 in (1.91 m)	282 lb (128 kg)	Feb 2, 2022
Caden Story; DL	Recruit ratings: Rivals: 247Sports: ESPN: (81)				
Cole Turner; WR	Birmingham, Alabama	Vestavia Hills High School	6 ft 2 in (1.88 m)	178 lb (81 kg)	Jan 16, 2022
Cole Turner; WR	Recruit ratings: Rivals: 247Sports: ESPN: (76)				
Antonio Williams; WR	Irmo, South Carolina	Dutch Fork High School	6 ft 0 in (1.83 m)	180 lb (82 kg)	Dec 9, 2021
Antonio Williams; WR	Recruit ratings: Rivals: 247Sports: ESPN: (84)				
Wade Woodaz; S	Tampa, Florida	Jesuit High School	6 ft 3 in (1.91 m)	205 lb (93 kg)	Nov 25, 2021
Wade Woodaz; S	Recruit ratings: Rivals: 247Sports: ESPN: (79)				
Overall recruit ranking: Rivals: 10 247Sports: 10 ESPN: 14
Note: In many cases, Scout, Rivals, 247Sports, On3, and ESPN may conflict in their listings of height and weight.; In these cases, the average was taken. ESPN grades are on a 100-point scale.; Sources: "Rivals commits". Rivals.; "ESPN commits". ESPN.; "2022 Team Ranking". Rivals.com.; "247Sports commits". 247Sports.

=== Players leaving for NFL ===
==== NFL draftees ====
Round	Pick	Player	Position	NFL club
2	42	Andrew Booth Jr.	CB	Minnesota Vikings
7	231	Baylon Spector	LB	Buffalo Bills

==== Undrafted free agents ====
Player	Position	NFL club	Reference
Nolan Turner	S	Tampa Bay Buccaneers	
James Skalski	LB	Indianapolis Colts	
Mario Goodrich	CB	Philadelphia Eagles	
Justyn Ross	WR	Kansas City Chiefs	

=== Transfers ===
==== Players leaving ====
Players leaving
Name	Number	Pos.	Height	Weight	Year	Hometown	College transferred to	Source(s)
Dacari Collins	3	WR	6'4"	215	Sophomore	Atlanta, GA	NC State	
Lannden Zanders	36	S	6'1"	200	(redshirt) Junior	Shelby, NC	Retired from football	
Sergio Allen	45	LB	6'1"	230	Junior	Fort Valley, GA	Cal	
Hunter Rayburn	55	OL	6'4"	230	(redshirt) Junior	Pensacola, FL	Retired from football	
Jaelyn Lay	85	TE	6'6"	270	(redshirt) Sophomore	Riverdale, GA	Alabama State	
Darnell Jefferies	90	DT	6'2"	290	(redshirt) Junior	Covington, GA	Minnesota	

==== Incoming transfers ====
Incoming transfers
Name	Number	Pos.	Height	Weight	Year	Hometown	Previous school	Source(s)
Hunter Johnson	12	QB	6'2"	210	(redshirt) Senior	Brownsburg, IN	Northwestern	

==== Post-season transfers ====
The following players entered the transfer portal during the designated 45-day window after championship selections were made.

Postseason transfers
Name	Number	Pos.	Height	Weight	Year	Hometown	College transferred to	Source(s)
Fred Davis II	2	DB	6'0"	190	Junior	Jacksonville, FL	UCF	
DJ Uiagalelei	5	QB	6'4"	235	Junior	Riverside, CA	Oregon State	
E.J. Williams Jr.	6	WR	6'3"	195	Junior	Phenix City, AL	Indiana	
Kobe Pace	7	RB	5'10"	210	Junior	Cedartown, GA	Virginia	
Kevin Swint	14	DE	6'3"	225	Junior	Carrollton, GA	Georgia State	
Billy Wiles	17	QB	6'3"	215	(redshirt) Freshman	Ashburn, VA	Southern Miss	
Etinosa Reuben	32	DL	6'3"	285	(redshirt) Junior	Kansas City, MO	Georgia Tech	
LaVonta Bentley	42	LB	6'0"	235	(redshirt) Junior	Birmingham, AL	Colorado	

== Preseason ==
=== Award watchlists ===
Listed in the order that they were released

Award	Player	Position	Year
Lott Trophy	Bryan Bresee	DT	JR
Lott Trophy	Trenton Simpson	LB	JR
Dodd Trophy	Dabo Swinney	HC	—
Maxwell Award	Will Shipley	RB	SO
Davey O'Brien Award	Will Shipley	RB	SO
John Mackey Award	Davis Allen	TE	SR
Rimington Trophy	Will Putnam	OL	SR
Butkus Award	Trenton Simpson	LB	JR
Jim Thorpe Award	Andrew Mukuba	DB	SO
Bronko Nagurski Trophy	Bryan Bresee	DT	JR
Bronko Nagurski Trophy	Myles Murphy	DE	JR
Bronko Nagurski Trophy	Trenton Simpson	LB	JR
Outland Trophy	Bryan Bresee	DT	JR
Outland Trophy	Myles Murphy	DE	JR
Outland Trophy	Jordan McFadden	OT	(redshirt) SR
Lou Groza Award	B. T. Potter	PK	(redshirt) SR
Paul Hornung Award	Will Shipley	RB	SO
Wuerffel Trophy	Will Shipley	RB	SO
Bednarik Award	Bryan Bresee	DT	JR
Bednarik Award	Myles Murphy	DE	JR
Bednarik Award	Trenton Simpson	LB	JR
Lombardi Award	Bryan Bresee	DT	JR
Lombardi Award	Jordan McFadden	OT	(redshirt) SR
Lombardi Award	Myles Murphy	DE	JR
Lombardi Award	Trenton Simpson	LB	JR
Polynesian College Football; Player of the Year Award	DJ Uiagalelei	QB	JR
Johnny Unitas Golden Arm Award	DJ Uiagalelei	QB	JR

== Schedule ==
Date	Time	Opponent	Rank	Site	TV	Result	Attendance
September 5	8:00 p.m.	vs. Georgia Tech	No. 4	Mercedes-Benz Stadium; Atlanta, GA (Chick-fil-A Kickoff, rivalry)	ESPN	W 41–10	45,000
September 10	3:30 p.m.	Furman*	No. 5	Memorial Stadium; Clemson, SC	ACCN	W 35–12	78,302
September 17	8:00 p.m.	Louisiana Tech*	No. 5	Memorial Stadium; Clemson, SC	ACCN	W 48–20	80,542
September 24	12:00 p.m.	at No. 21 Wake Forest	No. 5	Truist Field at Wake Forest; Winston-Salem, NC	ABC	W 51–45 ^{2OT}	32,903
October 1	7:30 p.m.	No. 10 NC State	No. 5	Memorial Stadium; Clemson, SC (Textile Bowl, College GameDay)	ABC	W 30–20	81,500
October 8	7:30 p.m.	at Boston College	No. 5	Alumni Stadium; Chestnut Hill, MA (O'Rourke–McFadden Trophy)	ABC	W 31–3	42,138
October 15	7:30 p.m.	at Florida State	No. 4	Doak Campbell Stadium; Tallahassee, FL (rivalry)	ABC	W 34–28	71,098
October 22	12:00 p.m.	No. 14 Syracuse^{†}	No. 5	Memorial Stadium; Clemson, SC	ABC	W 27–21	81,500
November 5	7:30 p.m.	at Notre Dame*	No. 4	Notre Dame Stadium; Notre Dame, IN	NBC	L 14–35	77,622
November 12	3:30 p.m.	Louisville	No. 10	Memorial Stadium; Clemson, SC	ESPN	W 31–16	80,176
November 19	3:30 p.m.	Miami (FL)	No. 9	Memorial Stadium; Clemson, SC	ESPN	W 40–10	81,340
November 26	12:00 p.m.	South Carolina*	No. 8	Memorial Stadium; Clemson, SC (rivalry)	ABC	L 30–31	81,500
December 3	8:00 p.m.	vs. No. 23 North Carolina	No. 9	Bank of America Stadium; Charlotte, NC (ACC Championship Game)	ABC	W 39–10	64,115
December 30	8:00 p.m.	vs. No. 6 Tennessee*	No. 7	Hard Rock Stadium; Miami, FL (Orange Bowl)	ESPN	L 14–31	63,912
*Non-conference game; ^{†}Homecoming; Rankings from AP Poll (and CFP Rankings, after November 1) - Released prior to game; All times are in Eastern time

== Rankings ==
Ranking movements Legend: ██ Increase in ranking ██ Decrease in ranking ( ) = First-place votes
	Week															
Poll	Pre	1	2	3	4	5	6	7	8	9	10	11	12	13	14	Final
AP	4	5	5	5	5	5	4	5	5 (1)	5	12	9	7	10	10	13
Coaches	4	4	4	5	5	5	5	5	5	5	12	9	8	11	11	12
CFP	Not released									4	10	9	8	9	7	Not released

== Personnel ==
=== Coaching staff ===
Clemson Tigers football current coaching staff
Name	Position	Alma mater	Years at Clemson
Dabo Swinney	Head coach	University of Alabama (1993)	15th
Wes Goodwin	Assistant coach/defensive coordinator/linebackers coach	Mississippi State University (2009)	11th
Mike Reed	Assistant coach/Special teams coordinator/cornerbacks coach	Boston College (1994)	10th
Brandon Streeter	Assistant coach/offensive coordinator/quarterbacks coach	Clemson University (1999)	8th
Mickey Conn	Assistant coach/co-defensive coordinator/safeties coach	University of Alabama (1995)	7th
Kyle Richardson	Assistant coach/passing game coordinator/tight ends coach	Appalachian State University (2001)	7th
Thomas Austin	Assistant coach/offensive linemen coach	Clemson University (2010)	5th
Lemanski Hall	Assistant coach/defensive ends coach	University of Alabama (1993)	5th
Tyler Grisham	Assistant coach/wide receivers coach	Clemson University (2009)	3rd
C. J. Spiller	Assistant coach/running backs coach	Clemson University (2009)	2nd
Nick Eason	Assistant coach/defensive tackles coach	Clemson University (2001)	1st

=== Roster ===
As of September 13, 2022

2022 Clemson Tigers Football
Quarterback: 2 Cade Klubnik – freshman (6'2 185); 5 DJ Uiagalelei – junior (6'4, 250); 12 Hunter Johnson – graduate (6'2, 215); 14 Trent Pearman – freshman (6'2, 170); 16 Will Taylor – sophomore (5'10, 175); 17 Billy Wiles – (redshirt) freshman (6'3, 215); 18 Hunter Helms – (redshirt) sophomore (6'2, 210); Running back: 1 Will Shipley – sophomore (5'11, 205); 7 Kobe Pace – junior (5'10, 210); 19 Keith Adams Jr. – freshman (5'10, 200); 20 Domonique Thomas – (redshirt) sophomore (5'8, 195); 26 Phil Mafah – sophomore (6'1, 225); 31 Tristen Rigby – (redshirt) freshman (5'10, 200); 32 Wise Segars Jr. – (redshirt) freshman (6'1, 195); 34 Kevin McNeal – (redshirt) freshman (5'9, 195); Wide receiver: 0 Antonio Williams – freshman (6'0 180); 6 E.J. Williams Jr. – junior (6'3, 195); 8 Adam Randall – freshman (6'2, 215); 10 Joseph Ngata – senior (6'3, 220); 13 Brannon Specter – (redshirt) junior (6'1, 195); 15 Troy Stellato – (redshirt) freshman (6'1, 195); 22 Cole Turner – freshman (6'2, 180); 24 Hamp Greene – (redshirt) junior (5'9, 180); 25 Blackmon Huckabee Jr. – (redshirt) sophomore (5'11, 185); 80 Beaux Collins – sophomore (6'3, 205); 81 Drew Swinney – (redshirt) senior (5'9, 185); 82 Jackson Crosby – (redshirt) freshman (5'10, 180); 83 Hampton Earle – (redshirt) junior (5'10, 190); 86 Tye Herbstreit – (redshirt) junior (5'11, 170); 87 Michael Mankaka – freshman (6'1, 190); 88 Cale Swinney – freshman (5'11, 160); 89 Zach Jackson – (redshirt) freshman (6'3, 200); Tight end: 9 Jake Briningstool – sophomore (6'6, 235); 11 Sage Ennis – (redshirt) sophomore (6'4, 240); 33 Griffin Batt – freshman (6'2, 210); 40 Luke Price – graduate (6'2, 235); 43 Will Blackston – (redshirt) sophomore (6'1, 250); 44 Banks Pope – (redshirt) freshman (6'4, 250); 84 Davis Allen – senior (6'6, 250); 85 Josh Sapp – freshman (6'3, 235); Placekicker: 29 B. T. Potter – graduate (5'10, 190); 36 Quinn Castner – (redshirt) sophomore (5'5, 145); 37 Liam Boyd – freshman (6'1, 195); 38 Robert Gunn III – freshman (6'2, 175); 41 Jonathan Weitz – (redshirt) junior (5'11, 190); 47 Hogan Morton – (redshirt) freshman (5'9, 160)	Offensive lineman: 50 Collin Sadler – OL – freshman (6'6, 295); 51 Peyton Pitts – OL – freshman (6'6, 315); 53 Ryan Linthicum – OL – (redshirt) freshman (6'3, 300); 54 Mason Trotter – OL – (redshirt) junior (6'2, 285); 56 Will Putnam – OL – senior (6'4, 305); 59 Dietrick Pennington – OL – (redshirt) freshman (6'5, 335); 60 Mac Cranford – OL – (redshirt) junior (6'0, 285); 62 Connor Graham – OL – (redshirt) sophomore (6'2, 285); 64 Walker Parks – OL – junior (6'5, 300); 65 Chapman Pendergrass – OL – freshman (6'4, 300); 67 Nathan Brooks – OL – (redshirt) freshman (6'5, 280); 68 Will Boggs – OL – (redshirt) sophomore (6'3, 285); 69 Sam Judy – OL – (redshirt) freshman (6'5, 300); 70 Tristan Leigh – OL – (redshirt) freshman (6'6, 315); 71 Jordan McFadden – OT – (redshirt) senior (6'2, 310); 72 Mason Johnstone – OL – freshman (6'7, 250); 73 Bryn Tucker – OL – (redshirt) sophomore (6'3, 320); 74 Marcus Tate – OL – sophomore (6'5, 325); 75 Trent Howard – OL – (redshirt) sophomore (6'3, 290); 76 John Williams – OL – (redshirt) sophomore (6'4, 300); 77 Mitchell Mayes – OL – sophomore (6'3, 310); 78 Blake Miller – OL – freshman (6'6, 315); Defensive lineman: 3 Xavier Thomas – DE – graduate (6'2, 265); 5 KJ Henry – DE – (redshirt) senior (6'4, 260); 7 Justin Mascoll – DE – (redshirt) senior (6'4, 260); 8 Tré Williams – DT – (redshirt) sophomore (6'2, 300); 11 Bryan Bresee – DT – (redshirt) sophomore (6'5, 300); 13 Tyler Davis – DT – senior (6'2, 300); 14 Kevin Swint – DE – junior (6'3, 225); 15 Jahiem Lawson – DE – freshman (6'3, 215); 19 DeMonte Capehart – DT – (redshirt) sophomore (6'5, 310); 32 Etinosa Reuben – DT – (redshirt) junior (6'3, 285); 33 Ruke Orhorhoro – DT – (redshirt) junior (6'4, 295); 34 Armon Mason – DE – (redshirt) freshman (6'2, 210); 44 Cade Denhoff – DE – (redshirt) freshman (6'5, 250); 55 Payton Page – DT – sophomore (6'4, 335); 58 Evan McCutchen – DE – (redshirt) sophomore (6'2, 235); 90 Jabriel Robinson – DL – graduate (6'4, 260); 91 Zaire Patterson – DE – (redshirt) freshman (6'5, 250); 92 Levi Matthews – DE – freshman (6'5, 200); 93 Caden Story – DT – freshman (6'4, 275); 97 Andrew Roberts – DE – (redshirt) senior (6'4, 225); 98 Myles Murphy – DE – junior (6'5, 275); 99 Greg Williams – DE – (redshirt) junior (6'4, 260); Punter: 39 Aidan Swanson – (redshirt) junior (6'3, 180); 40 Brodey Conn – freshman (6'1, 190); 89 Jack Smith – freshman (6'5, 225)	Linebacker: 0 Barrett Carter – sophomore (6'1, 225); 6 Sheridan Jones – senior (6'0, 185); 17 Wade Woodaz – freshman (6'3, 205); 22 Trenton Simpson – junior (6'3, 230); 26 T.J. Dudley – freshman (6'3, 220); 29 Fletcher Cothran – freshman (6'3, 210); 30 Keith Maguire – (redshirt) junior (6'2, 230); 31 Kobe McCloud – freshman (6'0, 210); 42 LaVonta Bradley – (redshirt) junior (6'0, 235); 43 Riggs Faulkenberry – (redshirt) freshman (6'2, 205); 46 Jesiah Carlton – graduate (6'1, 230); 48 David Cote – (redshirt) junior (5'11, 215); 49 Matt Maloney – (redshirt) junior (6'0, 210); 51 Colby Doolittle – (redshirt) freshman (6'2, 225); 52 Joey Eddis – (redshirt) sophomore (5'11, 200); 54 Jeremiah Trotter Jr. – sophomore (6'0, 225); 56 Reed Morrissey – (redshirt) freshman (6'0, 200); Defensive back: 1 Andrew Mukuba – S – sophomore (6'0, 185); 2 Fred Davis II – CB – junior (6'0, 190); 9 R.J. Mickens – S – junior (6'0, 205); 10 Jeadyn Lukus – CB – freshman (6'2, 185); 12 Sherrod Covil Jr. – S – freshman (6'0, 190); 16 Myles Oliver – CB – freshman (6'0, 170); 18 Kylon Griffin – S – freshman (5'11, 185); 20 Nate Wiggins – CB – sophomore (6'2, 180); 21 Malcolm Greene – CB – junior (5'10, 190); 21 Jaden Kinard – S – freshman (6'0, 180); 23 Toriano Pride Jr. – CB – freshman (5'11, 185); 24 Tyler Venables – S – junior (5'10, 200); 25 Jalyn Phillips – S – senior (6'1, 205); 27 Carson Donnelly – S – graduate (5'11, 195); 35 Elijah Rodgers – CB – (redshirt) senior (6'1, 185); 37 Jacob Hendricks – S – (redshirt) freshman (5'7, 180); 38 Peter Nearn – S – (redshirt) freshman (6'2, 195); 39 Bubba McAtee – S – (redshirt) sophomore (6'3, 200); 41 Caleb Nix – S – freshman (6'1, 200); 47 Boston Miller – S – freshman (6'3, 200); Long snapper: 45 Philip Florenzo – (redshirt) sophomore (6'2, 240); 58 Holden Caspersen – (redshirt) freshman (5'11, 210)

== Game summaries ==
=== Vs. Georgia Tech ===
No. 4 Clemson Tigers vs Georgia Tech Yellow Jackets − Game summary

Quarter	1	2	3	4	Total
Georgia Tech	0	3	7	0	10
No. 4 Clemson	0	14	10	17	41

at Mercedes-Benz Stadium • Atlanta, GA

- Date: September 5, 2022
- Game time: 8:00 p.m.
- Game weather: n/a (game played indoors)
- Game attendance: 47,712
- Referee: Marcus Woods
- TV announcers (ESPN): Dave Pasch (play-by-play), Dusty Dvoracek (color), and Tom Luginbill (sideline)

Game information

First quarter

- None

Second quarter

- CLEM – Will Shipley 1 yard run, (B. T. Potter PAT), 9:53. Tigers 7–0. Drive: 4 plays, 5 yards, 2:10.
- CLEM – DJ Uiagalelei 6 yard pass to Beaux Collins, (Potter PAT), 3:52. Tigers 14–0. Drive: 8 plays, 67 yards, 2:49.'
- GT – Jude Kelly 45 yard field goal, 1:15. Tigers 14–3. Drive: 9 plays, 47 yards, 1:15.

Third quarter

- GT – Jeff Sims 13 yard pass to EJ Jenkins, (Kelly PAT), 9:47. Tigers 14–10. Drive: 9 plays, 57 yards, 4:29.
- CLEM – B. T. Potter 29 yard field goal, 5:41. Tigers 17–10. Drive: 12 plays, 63 yards, 4:06.
- CLEM – Uiagalelei 9 yard run, (Potter PAT), 1:18. Tigers 24–10. Drive: 9 plays, 74 yards, 1:18.

Fourth quarter

- CLEM – Potter 31 yard field goal, 2:14. Tigers 27–10. Drive: 6 plays, 26 yards, 2:14.
- CLEM – Shipley 3 yard run, (Potter PAT), 6:27. Tigers 34–10. Drive: 4 plays, 15 yards, 1:03.
- CLEM – Cade Klubnik 3 yard pass to Will Taylor, (Robert Gunn III PAT), 1:35. Tigers 41–10. Drive: 10 plays, 66 yards, 3:40.

Top passers

- CLEM – DJ Uiagalelei: 19–32, 209 yards, 1 TD
- GT – Jeff Sims: 23–36, 164 yards, 1 TD, 1 INT

Top rushers

- CLEM – Will Shipley: 10 rushes, 42 yards, 2 TDs
- GT – Jeff Sims: 13 rushes, 41 yards

Top Receiving

- CLEM – Beaux Collins: 3 receptions, 54 yards, 1 TD
- GT – Nate McCollum: 6 receptions, 55 yards

=== Furman ===
Furman Paladins (1–0) at No. 5 Clemson Tigers (1–0) − Game summary

Quarter	1	2	3	4	Total
Furman	3	6	3	0	12
No. 5 Clemson	14	14	7	0	35

at Memorial Stadium • Clemson, SC

- Date: September 10, 2022
- Game time: 3:30 p.m.
- Game weather: Temperature: 70 °F (21 °C) • Wind: NE @ 7 mph (11 km/h) • Weather: Cloudy
- Game attendance: 78,302
- Referee: Charles Lamertina
- TV announcers (ACCN): Wes Durham (play-by-play), Roddy Jones (analyst), and Taylor Davis (sideline)

Game information

First quarter

- CLEM – Will Shipley 1 yard run, (B. T. Potter PAT), 11:46. Tigers 7–0. Drive: 7 plays, 75 yards, 3:14.
- FUR – Axel Lepvreau 30 yard field goal, 7:59. Tigers 7–3. Drive: 8 plays, 62 yards, 3:48.
- CLEM – DJ Uiagalelei 2 yard pass to Jake Briningstool, (Potter PAT), 2:35. Tigers 14–3. Drive: 11 plays, 75 yards, 5:23.

Second quarter

- CLEM – Shipley 17 yard run, (Potter PAT), 9:10. Tigers 21–3. Drive: 9 plays, 68 yards, 4:25.
- FUR – Tyler Huff 25 yard pass to Ryan Miller, (Lepvreau PAT Missed), 1:53. Tigers 21–9. Drive: 5 plays, 54 yards, 1:15.
- CLEM – Kobe Pace 1 yard run, (Potter PAT), 00:26. Tigers 28–9. Drive: 9 plays, 75 yards, 1:27.

Third quarter

- CLEM – Uiagalelei 9 yars pass to Beaux Collins, (Potter PAT), 10:08. Tigers 35–9. Drive: 5 plays, 52 yards, 2:21.
- FUR – Lepvreau 30 yard field goal, 00:48. Tigers 35–12. Drive: 10 plays, 33 yards, 4:30.

Fourth quarter

- None

Top passers

- CLEM – DJ Uiagalelei: 21–27, 231 yards, 2 TD
- FUR – Tyler Huff: 31–40, 259 yards, 1 TD, 1 INT

Top rushers

- CLEM – Will Shipley: 10 rushes, 68 yards, 2 TDs
- FUR – Myion Hicks: 5 rushes, 33 yards

Top Receiving

- CLEM – Beaux Collins: 4 receptions, 57 yards, 1 TD
- FUR – Ryan Miller: 13 receptions, 95 yards, 1 TD

=== Louisiana Tech ===
Louisiana Tech Bulldogs (1–1) at No. 5 Clemson Tigers (2–0) − Game summary

Quarter	1	2	3	4	Total
Louisiana Tech	0	6	0	14	20
No. 5 Clemson	10	3	21	14	48

at Memorial Stadium • Clemson, SC

- Date: September 17, 2022
- Game time: 8:00 p.m.
- Game weather: Temperature: 78 °F (26 °C) • Wind: None • Weather: Clear
- Game attendance: 80,542
- Referee: Timothy Hedgepeth
- TV announcers (ACCN): Dave O'Brien (play-by-play), Tim Hasselbeck (analyst), and Kelsey Riggs (sideline)

Game information

First quarter

- CLEM – B. T. Potter 22 yard field goal, 11:44. Tigers 3–0. Drive: 9 plays, 70 yards, 3:16.
- CLEM – Will Shipley 2 yard run, (Potter PAT), 6:24. Tigers 10–0. Drive: 6 plays, 79 yards, 2:27.

Second quarter

- LAT – Jacob Barnes 35 yard field goal, 12:46. Tigers 10–3. Drive: 6 plays, 34 yards, 1:39.
- CLEM – Potter 36 yard field goal, 9:36. Tigers 13–3. Drive: 9 plays, 56 yards, 3:10.
- LAT – Barnes 27 yard field goal, 3:18. Tigers 13–6. Drive: 9 plays, 74 yards, 6:12

Third quarter

- CLEM – Shipley 32 yard rush, (Potter PAT), 14:40. Tigers 20–6. Drive: 1 play, 32 yards, 0:07.
- CLEM – Phil Mafah 4 yard rush, (Potter PAT), 5:25. Tigers 27–6. Drive: 14 plays, 90 yards, 6:46
- CLEM – DJ Uiagalelei 32 yard pass to Beaux Collins, (Potter PAT), 3:37. Tigers 34–6. Drive: 1 play, 32 yards, 0:09.

Fourth quarter

- LAT – Marquis Crosby 3 yard rush, (Barnes PAT), 12:52. Tigers 34–13. Drive: 8 plays, 79 yards, 3:36.
- LAT – Parker McNeil 13 yard pass to Tre Harris, (Barnes PAT), 9:30. Tigers 34–20. Drive: 5 plays, 44 yards, 1:35.
- CLEM – Uiagaleli 19 yard pass to Antonio Williams, (Potter PAT), 6:21. Tigers 41–20. Drive: 6 plays, 65 yards, 3:09.
- CLEM – Kobe Pace 3 yard rush, (Potter PAT), 4:53. Tigers 48–20. Drive: 3 plays, 12 yards, 1:01.

Top passers

- CLEM – DJ Uiagalelei: 17–29, 221 yards, 2 TD
- LAT – Parker McNeil: 23–42, 311 yards, 1 TD, 2 INT

Top rushers

- CLEM – Will Shipley: 12 rushes, 139 yards, 2 TDs
- LAT – Charvis Thornton: 4 rushes, 9 yards

Top Receiving

- CLEM – Antonio Williams: 2 catches, 57 yards, 1 TD
- LAT – Griffin Hebert: 5 catches, 122 yards

=== At No. 21 Wake Forest ===
No. 5 Clemson Tigers (3–0) at No. 21 Wake Forest Demon Deacons (3–0) − Game summary

Quarter	1	2	3	4	OT	2OT	Total
No. 5 Clemson	14	6	8	10	7	6	51
No. 21 Wake Forest	7	7	21	3	7	0	45

at Truist Field • Winston-Salem, NC

- Date: September 24, 2022
- Game time: Noon
- Game weather: Temperature: 69 °F (21 °C) • Wind: SW @ 6 mph (9.7 km/h) • Weather: Cloudy
- Game attendance: 32,903
- Referee: Jeff Heaser
- TV announcers (ABC): Sean McDonough (play-by-play), Todd Blackledge (analyst), and Molly McGrath (sideline)

Game information

First quarter

- CLEM – DJ Uiagalelei 12 yard pass to Jake Briningstool, (B. T. Potter PAT), 8:09. Tigers 7–0. Drive: 8 plays, 88 yards, 4:08.
- CLEM – Uiagalelei 41 yard pass to Brannon Spector, (Potter PAT), 5:09. Tigers 14–0. Drive: 5 plays, 75 yards, 2:06.
- WAKE – Sam Hartman 36 yard pass to Jahmal Banks (Matthew Dennis PAT), 4:13. Tigers 14–7. Drive: 3 plays, 75 yards, 00:56.

Second quarter

- CLEM – Potter 24 yard field goal, 7:49. Tigers 17–7. Drive: 10 plays, 58 yards, 5:07.
- WAKE – Hartman 5 yard pass to Banks, (Dennis PAT), 5:49. Tigers 17–14. Drive 4 plays, 68 yards, 1:20.
- CLEM – Potter 38 yard field goal, 00:14. Tigers 20–14. Drive: 15 plays, 51 yards, 5:30.

Third quarter

- WAKE – Hartman 28 yard pass to Donavon Greene, (Dennis PAT), 12:13. Demon Deacons 21–20. Drive: 4 plays, 68 yards, 1:20.
- WAKE – Hartman 19 yard pass to Blake Whiteheart, (Dennis PAT), 7:47. Demon Deacons 28–20. Drive: 7 plays, 70 yards, 2:52.
- CLEM – Uiagalelei 3 yard pass to Davis Allen, (Potter PAT), 4:29. Tied 28–28. Drive: 9 plays, 75 yards, 3:18.
- WAKE – Hartman 25 yard pass to D. Green, (Dennis PAT), 1:19. Demon Deacons 35–28. Drive: 8 plays, 75 yards, 3:10.

Fourth quarter

- CLEM – Will Shipley 1 yard run, (Potter PAT), 11:16. Tied 35–35. Drive: 10 plays, 75 yards, 5:03.
- WAKE – Dennis 29 yard field goal, 8:07. Demon Deacons 38–35. Drive: 7 plays, 64 yards, 3:09.
- CLEM – Potter 52 yard field goal, 4:01. Tied 38–38. Drive: 7 plays, 17 yards, 4:01.

Overtime

- WAKE – Hartman 8 yard pass to A. T. Perry, (Dennis PAT). Demon Deacons 45–38 . Drive: 5 plays, 25 yards.
- CLEM – Uiagaleli 21 yard pass to Beaux Collins, (Potter PAT). Tied 45–45. Drive: 3 plays, 21 yards.

Second Overtime

- CLEM – Uiagaleli 21 yard pass to Allen, (2-point attempt failed). Tigers 51–45. Drive: 3 plays 25 yards.

Top passers

- CLEM – DJ Uiagalelei: 26–41, 317 yards, 5 TDs
- WAKE – Sam Hartman: 20–29, 337 yards, 6 TDs

Top rushers

- CLEM – Will Shipley: 20 rushes, 104 yards, 1 TD
- WAKE – Justice Ellison: 21 rushes, 77 yards

Top Receiving

- CLEM – Joseph Ngata: 4 receptions, 84 yards
- WAKE – Jahmal Banks: 6 receptions, 141 yards, 2 TDs

=== No. 10 NC State ===
No. 10 NC State Wolfpack (4–0) at No. 5 Clemson Tigers (4–0) − Game summary

Quarter	1	2	3	4	Total
No. 10 NC State	3	7	3	7	20
No. 5 Clemson	3	10	7	10	30

at Memorial Stadium • Clemson, SC

- Date: October 1, 2022
- Game time: 7:30 p.m.
- Game weather: Temperature: 69 °F (21 °C) • Wind: North @ 5 mph (8.0 km/h) • Weather: Cloudy
- Game attendance: 81,500
- Referee: Marcus Woods
- TV announcers (ABC): Chris Fowler (play-by-play), Kirk Herbstreit (analyst), and Holly Rowe (sideline)

Game information

First quarter

- CLEM – B. T. Potter 20 yard field goal, 8:22. Tigers 3–0. Drive: 13 plays, 72 yards, 6:38.
- NCSU – Christopher Dunn 20 yard field goal, 0:19. Tied 3–3. Drive: 15 plays, 78 yards, 8:03.

Second quarter

- CLEM – Potter 46 yard field goal, 5:47. Tigers 6–3. Drive: 14 plays, 59 yards, 7:27.
- NCSU – Devin Leary 2 yard pass to Cedd Seabrough (Dunn PAT), 1:51. Wolfpack 10–6. Drive: 9 plays, 75 yards, 3:56.
- CLEM – DJ Uiagalelei 1 yard run, (Potter PAT), 0:31. Tigers 13–10. Drive: 8 plays, 75 yards, 1:20.

Third quarter

- CLEM – Uiagalelei 7 yard pass to Jake Briningstool (Potter PAT), 11:36. Tigers 20–10. "Drive: 4 plays, 58 yards, 1:52.'
- NCSU – Dunn 49 yard field goal, 9:06. Tigers 20–13. Drive: 10 plays, 43 yards, 2:30.

Fourth quarter

- CLEM – Potter 44 yard field goal, 14:16. Tigers 23–13. Drive: 7 plays, 25 yards, 3:18.
- CLEM – Uiagalelei 9 yard run, (Potter PAT), 3:04. Tigers 30–13. Drive: 9 plays, 58 yards, 4:35.
- NCSU – Leary 4 yard run (Dunn PAT), 0:53. Tigers 30-20. Drive: 8 plays, 75 yards, 2:11.

Top passers

- CLEM – DJ Uiagalelei: 21–30, 209 yards, 1 TD
- NCST – Devin Leary: 28–47, 245 yards, 1 TD, 1 INT

Top rushers

- CLEM – DJ Uiagalelei: 14 rushes, 73 yards, 2 TD
- NCST – Jordan Houston: 7 rushes, 32 yards

Top Receiving

- CLEM – Jake Briningstool: 4 receptions, 54 yards, 1 TD
- NCST – Thayer Thomas: 9 receptions, 84 yards

=== At Boston College ===
No. 5 Clemson Tigers (5–0) at Boston College Eagles (2–3) − Game summary

Quarter	1	2	3	4	Total
No. 5 Clemson	3	7	7	14	31
Boston College	0	3	0	0	3

at Alumni Stadium • Chestnut Hill, MA

- Date: October 8, 2022
- Game time: 7:30 p.m.
- Game weather: Temperature: 55 °F (13 °C) • Wind: West @ 6 mph (9.7 km/h) • Weather: Clear
- Game attendance: 42,138
- Referee: Adam Savoie
- TV announcers (ABC): Sean McDonough (play-by-play), Todd Blackledge (analyst), and Molly McGrath (sideline)

Game information

First quarter

- CLEM – B. T. Potter 35 yard field goal, 11:28. Tigers 3–0. Drive: 9 plays, 54 yards, 3:32.

Second quarter

- BC – Connor Lytton 30 yard field goal, 14:56. Tied 3–3'. Drive: 6 plays, 48 yards, 2:44.
- CLEM – Will Shipley 1 yard run, (Potter PAT), 00:45. Tigers 10–3. Drive: 7 plays, 28 yards, 3:00.

Third quarter

- CLEM – DJ Uiagalelei 38 yard pass to Joseph Ngata, 11:50. Tigers 17–3. Drive: 5 plays, 73 yards, 1:49.

Fourth quarter

- CLEM – Uiagalelei 10 yard pass to Beaux Collins, 14:57. Tigers 24–3. Drive: 8 plays, 72 yards, 3:25.
- CLEM – Uiagalelei 13 yard pass to Brannon Spector, 4:22. Tigers 31–3. Drive: 6 plays, 88 yards, 2:12.

Top passers

- CLEM – DJ Uiagalelei: 18–32, 220 yards, 3 TDs
- BC – Phil Jurkovec: 19–40, 188 yards

Top rushers

- CLEM – DJ Uiagalelei: 12 rushes, 69 yards
- BC – Xavier Coleman: 11 rushes, 37 yards

Top Receiving

- CLEM – Beaux Collins: 4 receptions, 58 yards, 1 TD
- BC – Zay Flowers: 8 receptions, 75 yards

=== At Florida State ===
No. 4 Clemson Tigers (6–0) at Florida State Seminoles (4–2) − Game summary

Quarter	1	2	3	4	Total
No. 4 Clemson	7	17	10	0	34
Florida State	7	7	0	14	28

at Doak Campbell Stadium • Tallahassee, FL

- Date: October 15, 2022
- Game time: 7:30 p.m.
- Game weather: Temperature: 77 °F (25 °C) • Wind: Northwest @ 1 mph (1.6 km/h) • Weather: Clear
- Game attendance: 71,098
- Referee: Mike Roche
- TV announcers (ABC): Chris Fowler (play-by-play), Kirk Herbstreit (analyst), and Holly Rowe (sideline)

Game information

First quarter

- FSU – Jordan Travis 20 yard run, (Ryan Fitzgerald PAT), 11:41. Seminoles 7–0. Drive: 9 plays, 75 yards, 3:19.
- CLEM – DJ Uiagalelei 59 yard pass to Antonio Williams, (B. T. Potter PAT), 6:52. Tied 7–7. Drive: 4 plays, 73 yards, 1:19.

Second quarter

- FSU – DJ Lundy 1 yard run, (Fitzgerald PAT), 14:55. Seminoles 14–7. Drive: 15 plays, 93 yards, 6:50.
- CLEM – Uiagalelei 7 yard pass to Jake Briningstool, (Potter PAT), 8:19. Tied 14–14. Drive: 13 plays, 75 yards, 6:36.
- CLEM – Potter 47 yard field goal, 1:51. Tigers 17–14. Drive: 12 plays, 39 yards, 4:07.
- CLEM – Uiagalelei 5 yard run, (Potter PAT), 00:19. Tigers 24–14. Drive: 3 plays, 42 yards, 00:28.

Third quarter

- CLEM – Uiagalelei 31 yard pass to Davis Allen, (Potter PAT), 14:41. Tigers 31–14. Drive: 1 play, 31 yards, 00:07.
- CLEM – Potter 34 yard field goal, 7:32. Tigers 34–14. Drive: 11 plays, 18 yards, 4:59.

Fourth quarter

- FSU – Travis 6 yard pass to Ja'Khi Douglas, (Fitzgerald PAT), 9:22. Tigers 34–21. Drive: 7 plays, 60 yards, 2:23.
- FSU – Travis 25 yard pass to Kentron Poitier, (Fitzgerald PAT), 2:17. Tigers 34–28. Drive: 7 plays 94 yards, 1:35.

Top passers

- CLEM – DJ Uiagalelei: 15–23, 203 yards, 3 TDs
- FSU – Jordan Travis: 24–42, 254 yards, 2 TDs

Top rushers

- CLEM – Will Shipley: 6 rushes, 121 yards
- FSU – Trey Benson: 7 rushes, 69 yards

Top Receiving

- CLEM – Antonio Williams: 2 receptions, 76 yards, 1 TD
- FSU – Johnny Wilson: 6 receptions, 75 yards

=== No. 14 Syracuse ===
No. 14 Syracuse Orange at No. 5 Clemson Tigers − Game summary

Quarter	1	2	3	4	Total
No. 14 Syracuse	7	14	0	0	21
No. 5 Clemson	7	3	0	17	27

at Memorial Stadium • Clemson, SC

- Date: October 22, 2022
- Game time: 12:00 p.m.
- Game weather: Temperature: 63 °F (17 °C) • Wind: Southeast @ 3 mph (4.8 km/h) • Weather: Sunny
- Game attendance: 81,500
- Referee: Jeff Flanagan
- TV announcers (ABC): Sean McDonough (play-by-play), Todd Blackledge (analyst), and Molly McGrath (sideline)

Game information

First quarter

- CLEM – Will Shipley 1 yard run, (B. T. Potter PAT), 7:45. Tigers 7–0. Drive: 7 plays, 71 yards, 2:46.
- CUSE – Garrett Shrader 12 yard pass to Sean Tucker, (Andre Szmyt PAT), 5:30. Tied 7–7. Drive: 5 plays, 75 yards, 2:25.

Second quarter

- CUSE – Ja'Had Carter 90 yard fumble return, (Szmyt PAT), 9:14. Orange 14–7. Drive: 1 play, 90 yards.
- CUSE – Shrader 7 yard run, (Szmyt PAT), 1:53. Orange 21–7. Drive: 8 plays, 68 yards, 2:47.
- CLEM – Potter 44 yard field goal, 0:07. Orange 21–10. Drive: 10 plays, 49 yards, 1:46.

Third quarter

- None

Fourth quarter

- CLEM – Phil Mafah 1 yard run, (2 pt attempt failed), 13:46. Orange 21–16. Drive: 15 plays, 80 yards, 6:07.
- CLEM – Shipley 50 yard rush, (2 pt attempt successful), 11:26. Tigers 24–21. Drive: 2 plays, 61 yards, 00:23.
- CLEM – Potter 44 yard field goal, 1:33. Tigers 27–21. Drive: 6 plays, 22 yards, 2:23.

Top passers

- CLEM – DJ Uiagalelei: 13–21, 138 yards, 2 INTs
- CUSE – Garrett Shrader: 18–26, 167 yards, 1 TD, 1 INT

Top rushers

- CLEM – Will Shipley: 27 rushes, 172 yards, 2 TDs
- CUSE – Garrett Shrader: 21 rushes, 71 yards, 1 TD

Top Receiving

- CLEM – Davis Allen: 3 receptions, 50 yards
  Joseph Ngata: 3 receptions 50 yards
- CUSE – Oronde Gadsden II: 6 receptions, 86 yards

=== At Notre Dame ===
No. 4 Clemson Tigers at Notre Dame Fighting Irish − Game summary

Quarter	1	2	3	4	Total
No. 4 Clemson	0	0	0	14	14
Notre Dame	7	7	0	21	35

at Notre Dame Stadium • Notre Dame, IN

- Date: November 5, 2022
- Game time: 7:30 p.m.
- Game weather: Temperature: 55 °F (13 °C) • Wind: Southwest @ 23 mph (37 km/h) • Weather: Clear
- Game attendance: 77,622
- Referee: Adam Savole
- TV announcers (NBC): Jac Collinsworth (play-by-play), Jason Garrett (analyst), and Zora Stephenson (sideline)

Game information

First quarter

- ND – Prince Kollie 17 yard blocked punt return, (Blake Grupe PAT), 9:08. Fighting Irish 7–0.

Second quarter

- ND – Drew Pyne 5 yard run, (Grupe PAT), 00:38. Fighting Irish 14–0. Drive: 11 plays, 78 yards, 5:47.

Third quarter

- None

Fourth quarter

- ND – Audric Estimé 2 yard run, (Grupe PAT), 14:37. Fighting Irish 21–0. Drive: 3 plays, 14 yards, 1:05.
- CLEM – Will Shipley 1 yard run, (B. T. Potter PAT), 10:14. Fighting Irish 21–7. Drive: 11 plays, 75 yards, 2:44.
- ND – Pyne 17 yard pass to Michael Mayer, (Grupe PAT), 4:16. Fighting Irish 35–7. Drive: 11 plays, 75 yards, 5:58.
- CLEM – DJ Uiagalelei 4 yard pass to Joseph Ngata, (Potter PAT), 1:35. Fighting Irish 35–14. Drive: 10 plays, 75 yards, 2:41.

Top passers

- CLEM – DJ Uiagalelei: 27–39, 191 yards, 1 TD, 1 INT
- ND – Drew Pyne: 9–17, 85 yards, 1 TD

Top rushers

- CLEM – Will Shipley: 12 rushes, 63 yards, 1 TD
- ND – Logan Diggs: 17 rushes, 114 yards

Top Receiving

- CLEM – Davis Allen: 7 receptions, 60 yards
- ND – Michael Mayer: 4 receptions, 44 yards, 1 TD

=== Louisville ===
Louisville Cardinals at Clemson Tigers − Game summary

Quarter	1	2	3	4	Total
Louisville	0	7	3	6	16
No. 10 Clemson	10	7	7	7	31

at Memorial Stadium • Clemson, SC

- Date: November 12, 2022
- Game time: 3:30 p.m.
- Game weather: Temperature: 66 °F (19 °C) • Wind: Southwest @ 10 mph (16 km/h) • Weather: Cloudy
- Game attendance: 80,176
- Referee: Jeff Heaser
- TV announcers (ESPN): Wes Durham (play-by-play), Rod Gilmore (analyst), and Tiffany Blackmon (sideline)

Game information

First quarter

- CLEM – DJ Uiagalelei 11 yard run, (B. T. Potter PAT), 10:17. Tigers 7–0. Drive: 12 plays, 75 yards, 4:43.
- CLEM – Potter 19 yard field goal, 2:25. Tigers 10–0. Drive: 8 plays, 66 yards, 3:10.

Second quarter

- LOU – Tiyon Eavns 16 yard run, (James Turner PAT), 14:17. Tigers 10–7. Drive: 7 plays, 80 yards, 3:05.
- CLEM – Uiagalelei 4 yard pass to Antonio Willimas, (Potter PAT), 00:32. Tigers 17–7. Drive: 10 plays, 80 yards, 3:57.

Third quarter

- CLEM – Will Shipley 25 yard run, (Potter PAT), 10:32. Tigers 24–7. Drive: 8 plays, 85 yards, 2:56.
- LOU – Turner 22 yard field goal, 5:57. Tigers 24–10. Drive: 8 plays, 70 yards, 4:35.

Fourth quarter

- CLEM – Phil Mafah 39 yard run, (Potter PAT), 02:13. Tigers 31–10. Drive: 1 play, 39 yards, 0:10.
- LOU – Brock Domann 31 yard pass to Braden Smith, (no PAT), 00:00. Tigers 31–16. Drive: 7 plays, 75 yards, 2:13.

Top passers

- CLEM – DJ Uiagalelei: 19–27, 185 yards, 1 TD
- LOU – Brock Domann: 13–23, 175 yards, 1 TD, 1 INT

Top rushers

- CLEM – Phil Mafah: 10 rushes, 106 yards, 1 TD
- LOU – Jawhar Jordan: 11 rushes, 73 yards

Top Receiving

- CLEM – Antonio Williams: 10 catches, 83 yards, 1 TD
- LOU – Tyler Hudson: 11 catches, 163 yards

=== Miami (FL) ===
Miami Hurricanes at Clemson Tigers − Game summary

Quarter	1	2	3	4	Total
Miami (FL)	0	0	3	7	10
No. 9 Clemson	14	10	2	14	40

at Memorial Stadium • Clemson, SC

- Date: November 19, 2022
- Game time: 3:30 p.m.
- Game weather: Temperature: 56 °F (13 °C) • Wind: Southwest @ 10 mph (16 km/h) • Weather: Sunny
- Game attendance: 81,340
- Referee: Marcus Woods
- TV announcers (ESPN): Bob Wischusen (play-by-play), Dan Orlovsky (analyst), and Kris Budden (sideline)

Game information

First quarter

- CLEM – DJ Uiagalelei 7 yard pass to Davis Allen, (B. T. Potter PAT), 9:26. Tigers 7–0. Drive: 12 plays, 75 yards, 5:34.
- CLEM – Uiagalelei 8 yard run, (Potter PAT), 4:05. Tigers 14–0. Drive: 9 plays, 57 yards, 3:34.

Second quarter

- CLEM – Uiagalelei 3 yard pass to Luke Price, (Potter PAT), 10:22. Tigers 21–0. Drive: 6 plays, 27 yards, 2:45.
- CLEM – Potter 32 yard field goal, 00:00. Tigers 24–0. Drive: 14 plays, 76 yards, 4:46.

Third quarter

- MIA – Andres Borregales 44 yard field goal, 5:55. Tigers 24–3. Drive: 6 plays, 32 yards, 2:38.
- CLEM – Safety, 1:34. Tigers 26–3. Drive: 1 play, 0:27.

Fourth quarter

- MIA – Jake Garcia 1 yard pass to Kahlil Brantley, (Borregales PAT), 13:45. Tigers 26–10. Drive: 3 plays, 10 yards, 1:03.
- CLEM – Will Shipley 3 yard run, (Potter PAT) 4:40. Tigers 33–10. Drive: 8 plays, 86 yards, 4:47.
- CLEM – Kobe Pace 1 yard run, (Jonathan Weitz PAT), 00:16. Tigers 40–10. Drive: 7 plays, 36 yards, 3:40.

Top passers

- CLEM – DJ Uiagalelei: 22–34, 227 yards, 2 TDs, 1 INT
- MIA – Jacurri Brown: 6–13, 53 yards, 1 INT

Top rushers

- CLEM – DJ Uiagalelei: 17 rushes, 89 yards, 1 TD
- MIA – Jacurri Brown: 10 carries, 22 yards

Top Receiving

- CLEM – Davis Allen: 4 receptions, 35 yards, 1 TD
- MIA – Will Mallory: 4 receptions, 42 yards

=== South Carolina ===
South Carolina Gamecocks at Clemson Tigers − Game summary

Quarter	1	2	3	4	Total
South Carolina	0	14	14	3	31
No. 8 Clemson	14	9	7	0	30

at Memorial Stadium • Clemson, SC

- Date: November 26, 2022
- Game time: 12:00 p.m.
- Game weather: Temperature: 61 °F (16 °C) • Wind: Southeast @ 3 mph (4.8 km/h) • Weather: Sunny
- Game attendance: 81,500
- Referee: Matt Loeffler
- TV announcers (ABC): Sean McDonough (play-by-play), Todd Blackledge (analyst), and Molly McGrath (sideline)

Game information

First quarter

- CLEM – Jeremiah Trotter Jr. 35 yard interception return, (B. T. Potter PAT), 12:15. Tigers 7–0. Drive: 1 play, 35 yards, 00:08.
- CLEM – DJ Uiagalelei 9 yard run, (Potter PAT), 5:52. Tigers 14–0. Drive: 8 plays, 90 yards, 4:08.

Second quarter

- USC – Spencer Rattler 4 yard pass to Antwane Wells Jr., (Mitch Jeter PAT), 13:59. Tigers 14–7. Drive: 8 plays, 51 yards, 3:08.
- CLEM – Safety, 10:05. Tigers 16–7. Drive: 1 play, 0:06.
- USC – Rattler 4 yard urn, (Jeter PAT), 8:24. Tigers 16–14. Drive: 4 plays, 37 yards, 1:31.
- CLEM – Uiagalelei 11 yard pass to Antonio Williams, (Potter PAT), 6:14. Tigers 23–14. Drive: 5 plays, 75 yards, 2:10.

Third quarter

- USC – Jaheim Bell 2 yard run, (Jeter PAT), 12:06. Tigers 23–21. Drive: 4 plays, 26 yards, 1:52.
- CLEM – Will Shipley 11 yard run, 4:35. Tigers 30–21. Drive: 6 plays, 47 yards, 2:35.
- USC – Rattler 72 yard pass to Wells Jr., (Jeter PAT), 3:45. Tigers 30–28. Drive: 2 plays, 75 yards, 00:50.

Fourth quarter

- USC – Jeter 35 yard field goal, 10:54. Gamecocks 31–30. Drive: 10 plays, 54 yards, 6:21.

Top passers

- CLEM – DJ Uiagalelei: 8–29, 99 yards, 1 TD, 1 INT
- USC – Spencer Rattler: 25–39, 360 yards, 2 TDs, 2 INTs

Top rushers

- CLEM – Will Shipley: 15 rushes, 132 yards, 1 TD
- USC – Jaheim Bell: 9 rushes, 29 yards, 1 TD

Top Receiving

- CLEM – Beaux Collins: 2 receptions, 65 yards
- USC – Antwane Wells Jr.: 9 receptions, 131 yards, 2 TDs

=== Vs. No. 23 North Carolina ===
Clemson Tigers vs. North Carolina Tar Heels (ACC Championship game) − Game summary

Quarter	1	2	3	4	Total
No. 23 North Carolina	7	3	0	0	10
No. 9 Clemson	14	10	15	0	39

at Bank of America Stadium • Charlotte, NC

- Date: December 3, 2022
- Game time: 8:00 p.m. EST
- Game weather: Temperature: 58 °F (14 °C) • Wind: West @ 8 mph (13 km/h) • Weather: Cloudy
- Game attendance: 64,115
- Referee: Mike Roche
- TV announcers (ABC): Sean McDonough (play-by-play), Todd Blackledge (analyst), and Molly McGrath (sideline)

Game information

First quarter

- UNC – Drake Maye 3 yard rush, (Noah Burnette PAT), 8:50. Tar Heels 7-0. Drive: 11 plays, 78 yards, 5:13
- CLEM – Cade Klubnik 1 yard pass to Davis Allen, (B. T. Potter PAT), 1:41. Tied 7-7. Drive: 9 plays, 71 yards, 4:17
- CLEM – Phil Mafah 4 yard rush, (Potter PAT), 0:35. Tigers 14–7. Drive: 2 plays, 23 yards, 0:40

Second quarter

- CLEM – Cade Klubnik 1 yard rush, (Potter PAT), 6:02. Tigers 21–7. Drive: 5 plays, 84 yards, 1:57
- UNC – Noah Burnette 25 yard Field Goal, 1:20. Tigers 21–10. Drive: 11 plays, 67 yards, 4:42
- CLEM – Potter 52 yard Field Goal, 0:00. Tigers 24–10. Drive: 7 plays, 40 yards, 1:20

Third quarter

- CLEM – Nate Wiggins 98 yard interception return, (Drew Swinney rush for 2-pt conversion), 13:59. Tigers 32–10. Drive: 1 play, 98 yards, 0:21
- CLEM – Will Shipley 2 yard rush, (Potter PAT), 0:42. Tigers 39–10. Drive: 9 plays, 86 yards, 3:26

Fourth quarter

- None

Top passers

- CLEM – Cade Klubnik: 20–24, 279 yards, 1 TD
- UNC – Drake Maye: 26–42, 268 yards, 2 INT

Top rushers

- CLEM – Cade Klubnik: 7 rushes, 30 yards, 1 TD
- UNC – Elijah Green: 21 rushes, 65 yards

Top Receiving

- CLEM – Cole Turner: 3 receptions, 101 yards
- UNC – Josh Downs: 11 receptions, 100 yards

=== Vs. No. 6 Tennessee ===
Clemson Tigers vs. Tennessee Volunteers (Orange Bowl) − Game summary

Quarter	1	2	3	4	Total
No. 6 Tennessee	7	7	7	10	31
No. 7 Clemson	0	3	3	8	14

at Hard Rock Stadium • Miami Gardens, FL

- Date: December 30, 2022
- Game time: 8:00 p.m. EST
- Game weather: Temperature: 74 °F (23 °C) • Wind: Southeast @ 7 mph (11 km/h) • Weather: Clear
- Game attendance: 63,912
- Referee: Ron Snodgrass
- TV announcers (ESPN/ESPN Radio): Joe Tessitore (play-by-play), Greg McElroy (analyst), and Katie George (sideline)/Mike Couzens (play-by-play), Max Starks (analyst), and Paul Carcaterra (sideline)

Game information

First quarter

- TENN – Joe Milton 16 yard pass to Bru McCoy, (Chase McGrath PAT), 5:17. Volunteers 7–0. Drive: 12 plays, 75 yards, 4:01.

Second quarter

- TENN – Jabari Small 2 yard run, (McGrath PAT), 9:03. Volunteers 14–0. Drive: 5 plays, 75 yards, 1:12.
- CLEM – B. T. Potter 31 yard field goal. Volunteers 14–3. Drive: 10 plays, 46 yards, 3:52.

Third quarter

- CLEM – Potter 40 yard field goal. Volunteers 14–6. Drive: 10 plays, 45 yards, 4:03.
- TENN – Milton 14 yard pass to Squirrel White, (McGrath PAT), 0:05. Volunteers 21–6. Drive: 4 plays, 70 yards, 1:22.

Fourth quarter

- CLEM – Cade Klubnik 4 yard run, (2 point conversion good), 10:01. Volunteers 21–14. Drive: 12 plays, 71 yards, 5:04.
- TENN – Milton 46 yard pass to Ramel Keyton, (McGrath PAT), 8:34. Volunteers 28–14. Drive:6 plays, 75 yards, 1:27.
- TENN – McGrath 32 yard field goal, 3:07. Volunteers 31–14. Drive: 6 plays, 23 yards, 2:41.

Top passers

- CLEM – Cade Klubnik: 30–54, 320 yards, 2 INTs
- TENN – Joe Milton: 19–28, 251 yards, 3 TDs

Top rushers

- CLEM – Will Shipley: 17 rushes, 73 yards
- TENN – Jaylen Wright: 11 rushes, 89 yards

Top Receiving

- CLEM – Joseph Ngata: 8 receptions, 84 yards
- TENN – Squirrel White: 9 receptions, 108 yards, 1 TD

== Awards and honors ==
Individual awards
Player	Position	Award	Ref.
Jordan McFadden	OT	Jacobs Blocking Trophy	

All-American
Player	AP	AFCA	FWAA	TSN	WCFF	Designation
Tyler Davis	–	–	2	–	–	None
Jeremiah Trotter Jr.	2	–	–	–	–	None
The NCAA recognizes a selection to all five of the AP, AFCA, FWAA, TSN and WCFF first teams for unanimous selections and three of five for consensus selections. HM = Honorable mention. Source:

All-ACC
Player	Position	Team
Will Shipley	RB	First-Team
Will Shipley	AP	First-Team
Jordan McFadden	OT	First-Team
Myles Murphy	DE	First-Team
Tyler Davis	DT	First-Team
Will Shipley	SP	First-Team
KJ Henry	DE	Second Team
Bryan Bresee	DT	Second Team
B. T. Potter	PK	Second Team
Davis Allen	TE	Third Team
Will Putnam	C	Third Team
Trenton Simpson	LB	Third Team
Antonio Williams	WR	Honorable Mention
Walker Parks	OG	Honorable Mention
Marcus Tate	OG	Honorable Mention
Ruke Orhorhoro	DT	Honorable Mention
Jeremiah Trotter Jr.	LB	Honorable Mention
Barrett Carter	LB	Honorable Mention
Sheridan Jones	CB	Honorable Mention
Nate Wiggins	CB	Honorable Mention
Andrew Mukuba	S	Honorable Mention
Jalyn Phillips	S	Honorable Mention

== Players drafted into the NFL ==
Round	Pick	Player	Position	NFL club
1	28	Myles Murphy	DE	Cincinnati Bengals
1	29	Bryan Bresee	DT	New Orleans Saints
3	86	Trenton Simpson	LB	Baltimore Ravens
5	137	KJ Henry	DE	Washington Commanders
5	156	Jordan McFadden	OG	Los Angeles Chargers
5	175	Davis Allen	TE	Los Angeles Rams
