= FNHS =

FNHS may refer to:

- French National Honor Society (disambiguation)
- Niederhöchstadt station, in Germany

== See also ==
- FNH (disambiguation)
