= FNH =

FNH may refer to:

- Farnham railway station in England
- Felt, Not Heard, an American audio studio
- Ferrocarril Nacional de Honduras, the national rail operator in Honduras
- Fincha Airport, in Ethiopia
- FN Herstal, a Belgian firearms manufacturer
- Focal nodular hyperplasia
- Fools and Heroes, a British live-action role playing system
- Sidus FNH, a Korean movie production company
