= Mickey Conn =

American football player and coach (born 1971)

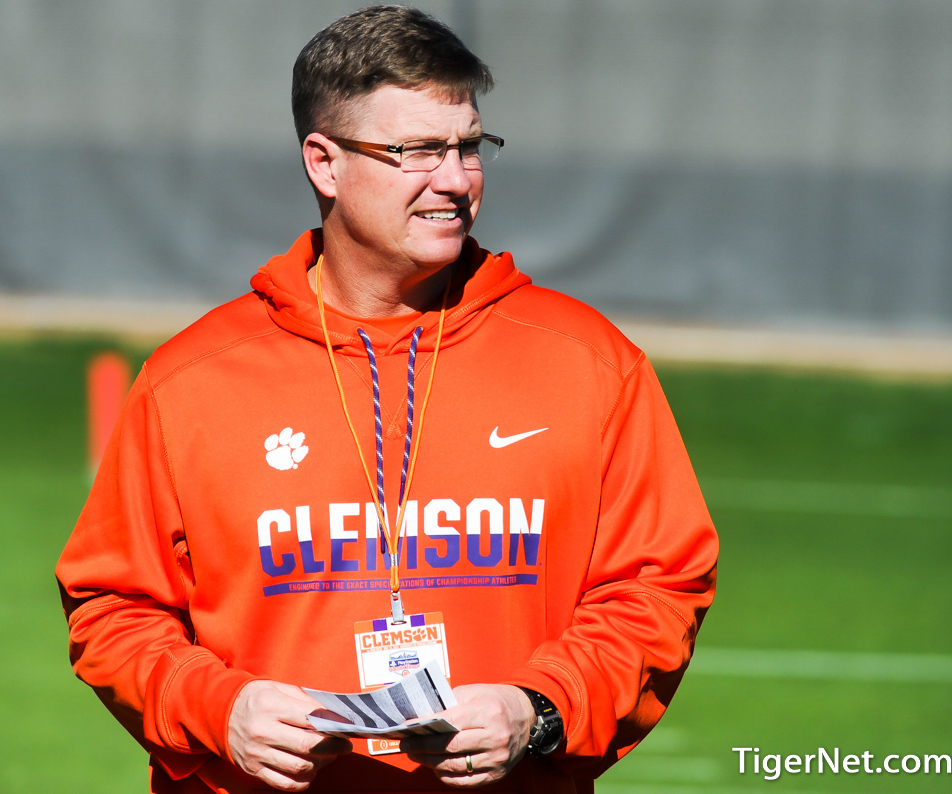

Current position
- Title: Defensive coordinator & safeties coach
- Team: Samford
- Conference: SoCon

Biographical details
- Born: October 9, 1971 (age 55)

Playing career
- 1990–1994: Alabama
- Position: Defensive back

Coaching career (HC unless noted)
- 1996–1997: Alabama (GA)
- 1998–1999: South Gwinnett HS (GA) (assistant)
- 2000–2015: Grayson HS (GA)
- 2016: Clemson (Defensive assistant)
- 2017–2020: Clemson (S)
- 2021: Clemson (ST/S)
- 2022–2025: Clemson (co-DC/S)
- 2026–present: Samford (DC/S)

Head coaching record
- Overall: 137–48 (high school)

Accomplishments and honors

Championships
- As a player: National champion (1992); As a coach: 2 National (2016, 2018)

Mickey Conn (born October 9, 1971) is an American football former coach and player who was the co-defensive coordinator and safeties coach at Clemson University. He had served in various assistant coaching roles at Clemson since 2016, including as defensive assistant in 2016, safeties coach from 2017 to 2020 and special teams coordinator and safeties coach in 2021.

Conn played college football at the University of Alabama as a defensive back from 1990 to 1994. Prior to his tenure at Clemson, Conn held a head coaching position at Grayson High School in Loganville, Georgia and two assistant coaching positions at South Gwinnett High School in Snellville, Georgia and at the University of Alabama.

== Playing career ==
Conn walked on to play defensive back for Gene Stallings at Alabama from 1990 to 1994 eventually getting a scholarship. He redshirted his freshman season and lettered from the 1992 national championship season to 1994.

== Coaching career ==
=== Alabama ===
Conn began his career in coaching at his alma mater Alabama in 1996 where he worked as a graduate assistant under his former head coach, Gene Stallings. He was retained in 1997 under Mike DuBose’s new staff also as a graduate assistant.

=== High school ===
In 1998 and 1999 Conn coached at his former high school, South Gwinnett High School in Atlanta. For the next 16 years Conn was the head coach at Grayson High School where he compiled a 137 and 48 record.

=== Clemson ===
Conn joined Clemson's coaching staff under his former teammate Dabo Swinney in 2016 as a defensive assistant. In 2017 he was promoted to safeties coach. For the 2021 season he was given the additional responsibility of being the team's special teams coordinator.

On December 14, 2021, Conn was promoted to co-defensive coordinator and safeties coach, alongside Wes Goodwin, replacing Brent Venables after his departure to become the head coach at the University of Oklahoma.

== Personal life ==
Conn is the uncle of former Appalachian State Mountaineers and quarterback for the BC Lions of the CFL Chase Brice. Conn and his wife Halie have two children.
