= Jeadyn Lukus =

American football player (born 2004)

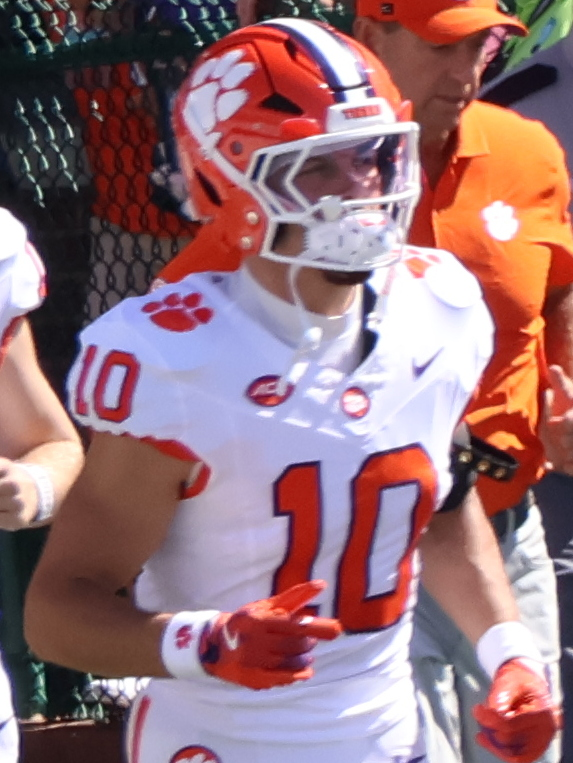
- Lukus in 2025

Profile
- Position: Cornerback

Personal information
- Born: February 11, 2004 (age 22); Greenville, South Carolina, U.S.
- Listed height: 6 ft 2 in (1.88 m)
- Listed weight: 205 lb (93 kg)

Career information
- High school: Mauldin (Mauldin, South Carolina)
- College: Clemson (2022–2025)
- NFL draft: 2026: undrafted

Career history
- Tennessee Titans (2026)*; Cleveland Browns (2026)*
- * Offseason or practice squad member only
- Stats at Pro Football Reference

Jeadyn Lukus (born February 11, 2004) is an American professional football cornerback. He played college football for the Clemson Tigers.

== Early life ==
Lukas was born on February 11, 2004 in Greenville, South Carolina. Lukus attended high school at Mauldin located in Mauldin, South Carolina. During his junior season, he totaled 36 tackles and an interception. Coming out of high school, Lukus was rated as a five star recruit, the fifth overall cornerback, and the 32nd overall player in the class of 2022, where he held offers from schools such as Alabama, Ohio State, North Carolina, Clemson, Oklahoma, Georgia, LSU, Notre Dame, and Florida. Ultimately, he committed to play college football for the Clemson Tigers over his other finalists Ohio State and North Carolina.

== College career ==
He finished his freshman season in 2022, notching six tackles with one being for a loss, and an interception. During the 2023 season, he played in seven games with four starts, recording five tackles and two pass deflections. Heading into the 2024 season, Lukus earned a starting spot at cornerback for the Tigers ahead of their week one matchup versus #1 Georgia. In his start vs the Bulldogs in week one of the 2024 season, he tallied seven tackles. Lukus finished the 2024 season, totaling 33 tackles with one and a half being for a loss, eight pass deflections, and an interception.

=== College statistics ===
Year	Team	Class	GP	Tackles					Interceptions				
Year	Team	Class	GP	Solo	Ast	Tot	Loss	Sk	Int	Yds	Avg	TD	PD
2022	Clemson	FR	11	7	1	8	1.0	0.0	1	0	0.0	0	0
2023	Clemson	SO	7	4	1	5	0.0	0.0	0	0	—	0	1
2024	Clemson	JR	14	28	6	34	1.5	0.0	1	0	0.0	0	7
2025	Clemson	SR	11	8	5	13	0.0	0.0	0	0	—	0	0
Career			43	47	13	60	2.5	0.0	2	0	0.0	0	9

== Professional career ==
Pre-draft measurables
Height	Weight	Arm length	Hand span	Wingspan	40-yard dash	10-yard split	20-yard split	20-yard shuttle	Three-cone drill	Vertical jump	Broad jump	Bench press
6 ft 2 in (1.88 m)	205 lb (93 kg)	32 3/4 in (0.83 m)	9 1/4 in (0.23 m)	6 ft 7 1/4 in (2.01 m)	4.41 s	1.46 s	2.53 s	4.36 s	6.95 s	35.5 in (0.90 m)	11 ft 7 in (3.53 m)	13 reps
All values from Pro Day

=== Tennessee Titans ===
On April 30, 2026, after going undrafted in the 2026 NFL draft, Lukus signed with the Tennessee Titans as an undrafted free agent. He was waived by Tennessee on August 1.

=== Cleveland Browns ===
On August 7, 2026, Lukus signed with the Cleveland Browns. He was waived by the Browns on August 19.
