= Billy Wiles (American football) =

American football player (born 2002)

Profile
- Position: Quarterback

Personal information
- Born: June 26, 2002 (age 24)
- Listed height: 6 ft 3 in (1.91 m)
- Listed weight: 215 lb (98 kg)

Career information
- High school: Stone Bridge (Ashburn, Virginia)
- College: Clemson (2021–2022); Southern Miss (2023); Appalachian State (2024–2025)
- Stats at ESPN

Billy Wiles (born June 26, 2002) is an American football quarterback. He played college football for the Appalachian State Mountaineers, the Clemson Tigers and the Southern Miss Golden Eagles.

== Early life ==
Wiles grew up in Ashburn, Virginia and attended Stone Bridge High School. During high school, he led the football team to a state title in the spring of 2021 by completing a 16-yard walk-off touchdown pass during overtime. He was rated a three-star recruit and committed to play college football at Clemson over offers from Bryant, Bucknell, Campbell, Fordham, Gardner–Webb, Georgetown, Harvard, Holy Cross, Howard, Lehigh, UMass, Old Dominion, Tulane, William & Mary and Yale.

== College career ==
=== Clemson ===
Wiles joined Clemson in 2021 as a walk-on. During the season, he completed 2 out of 4 passing attempts for 31 yards and a touchdown in 11 snaps making him the second Clemson walk-on quarterback to throw a touchdown pass. During the 2022 season, he was placed on scholarship but did not play or appear in a game that year. On December 4, 2022, Wiles announced that he had entered the transfer portal. On December 15, 2022, he announced that he would be transferring to Southern Miss.

=== Southern Miss ===
During the 2023 season, Wiles was named the starting quarterback. In his first game as a Golden Eagle against Alcorn State, he threw for 257 yards and three touchdowns. During a blowout 55-3 loss to South Alabama, Wiles was benched due to only throwing for 5 yards on a 40% completion percentage. He resumed starting duties the following week.

On April 12, 2024, Wiles announced that he would enter the transfer portal for the second time.

=== Appalachian State ===
On April 24, 2024, Wiles announced that he would transfer to Appalachian State.

=== College statistics ===
Season	Team	Games			Passing								Rushing	
Season	Team	GP	Cmp	Att	Pct	Yds	Avg	TD	Int	Rate	Att	Yds	Avg	TD
2021	Clemson	1	2	4	50.0	31	7.8	1	0	197.6	1	2	2.0	0
2022	Clemson	0	0	0	0	0	0	0	0	0	0	0	0	0
2023	Southern Miss	11	162	301	53.8	1,940	6.4	11	7	115.4	57	19	0.3	1
2024	Appalachian State	0	0	0	0	0	0.0	0	0	0.0	0	0	0.0	0
Career		12	164	305	53.8	1,971	6.5	12	7	116.4	58	21	0.4	1
