= Shaq Lawson =

American football player (born 1994)

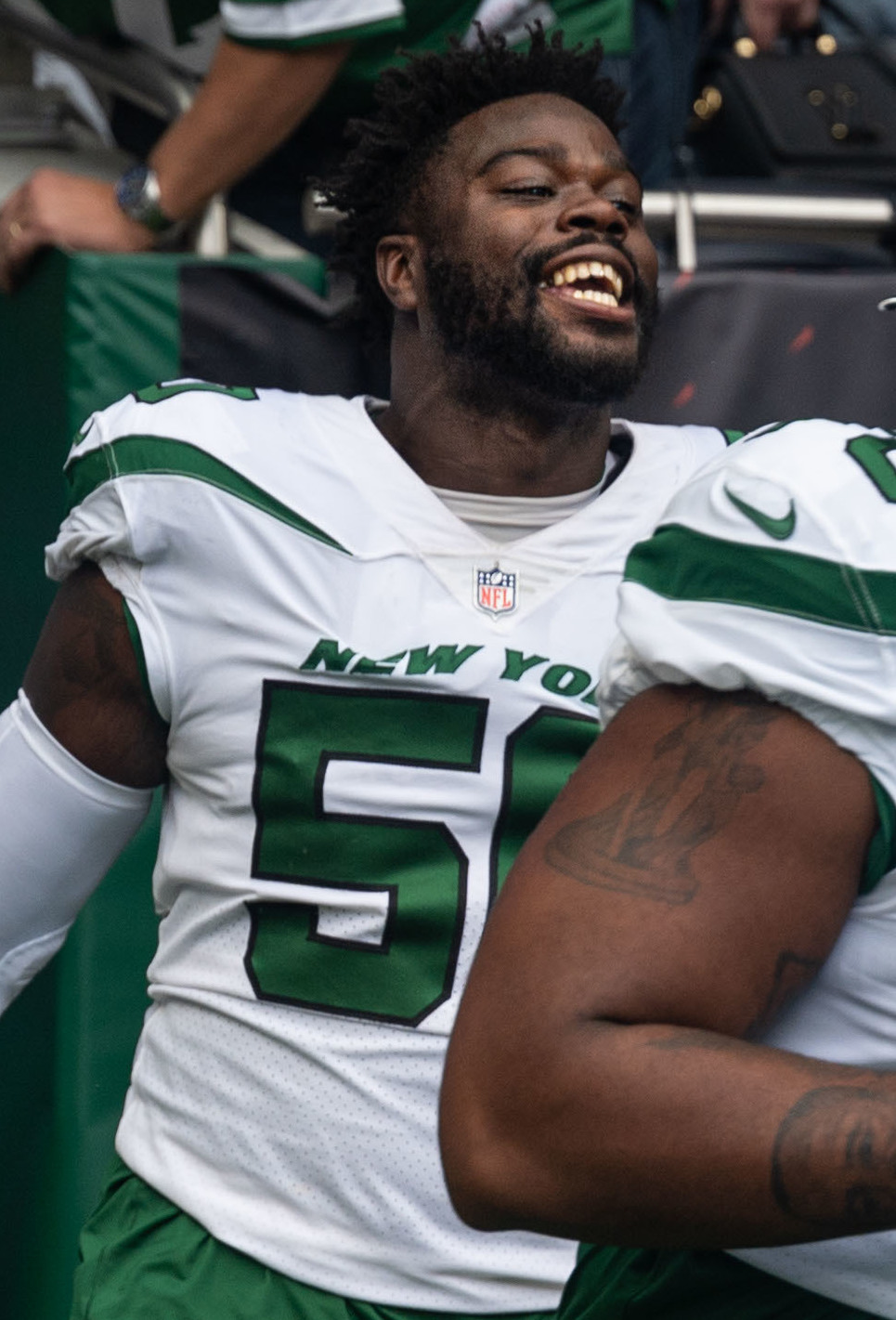
- Lawson with the New York Jets in 2021

Profile
- Position: Defensive end

Personal information
- Born: June 17, 1994 (age 32); Central, South Carolina, U.S.
- Listed height: 6 ft 3 in (1.91 m)
- Listed weight: 265 lb (120 kg)

Career information
- High school: D. W. Daniel (Central)
- College: Clemson (2013–2015)
- NFL draft: 2016: 1st round, 19th overall pick

Career history
- Buffalo Bills (2016–2019); Miami Dolphins (2020); Houston Texans (2021)*; New York Jets (2021); Buffalo Bills (2022–2023); Carolina Panthers (2024); Buffalo Bills (2025)*
- * Offseason or practice squad member only

Awards and highlights
- Consensus All-American (2015); First-team All-ACC (2015)

Career NFL statistics
- Total tackles: 207
- Sacks: 26.0
- Forced fumbles: 7
- Fumble recoveries: 2
- Pass deflections: 14
- Interceptions: 1
- Defensive touchdowns: 1
- Stats at Pro Football Reference

Shaquille Lawson (born June 17, 1994) is an American professional football defensive end. He played college football for the Clemson Tigers, and was selected by the Buffalo Bills in the first round of the 2016 NFL draft. Lawson has been on the Miami Dolphins, Houston Texans and was traded to the New York Jets during the 2021 season. Lawson was released by the Jets prior to their season finale and returned to the Bills the following offseason.

== Early life ==
Shaquille Olajuwan Lawson, named after the basketball players Shaquille O'Neal, and Hakeem Olajuwon, attended D. W. Daniel High School in Central, South Carolina. He had 99 tackles and nine sacks as a senior and 100 tackles and 13 sacks as a junior. Lawson was rated by Rivals.com as a four-star recruit and committed to Clemson University to play college football. After high school, Lawson attended Hargrave Military Academy for a year.

== College career ==
In his first year at Clemson in 2013, Lawson played in all 13 games and had 35 tackles and four sacks. The four sacks tied William Perry and Ricky Sapp for most by a first-year freshman in Clemson history at the time. This record was broken in the 2016 season by Dexter Lawrence. He again played in all 13 games as a sophomore in 2014 and made one start. For the season he had 44 tackles and 3.5 sacks. Lawson became a starter his junior year in 2015.

== Professional career ==
Pre-draft measurables
Height	Weight	Arm length	Hand span	40-yard dash	10-yard split	20-yard split	20-yard shuttle	Three-cone drill	Vertical jump	Broad jump
6 ft 2 5/8 in (1.90 m)	269 lb (122 kg)	32 3/4 in (0.83 m)	10 in (0.25 m)	4.70 s	1.63 s	2.75 s	4.21 s	7.16 s	33 in (0.84 m)	10 ft 0 in (3.05 m)
All values from NFL Combine

=== Buffalo Bills (first stint) ===
==== 2016–17 ====
The Buffalo Bills selected Lawson in the first round with the 19th overall pick in the 2016 NFL draft.

On May 17, 2016, Lawson underwent shoulder surgery after tweaking it during offseason drills and was ruled out four to six months.

On June 6, 2016, the Bills signed Lawson to a four-year, $10.27 million contract that includes $9.82 million guaranteed and a signing bonus of $5.67 million.

On August 30, 2016, Lawson was placed on the reserve/physically unable to perform list. He was activated to the active roster on October 21, 2016. Lawson recorded his first NFL sack against the New England Patriots in Week 8.

In 2017, Lawson started 10 out of 11 games played, recording 33 tackles and four sacks. He suffered an ankle injury in Week 13 and was placed on injured reserve on December 5, 2017.

==== 2018 ====
Lawson started the 2018 season as the backup to free-agent signing Trent Murphy, but still retained significant playing time as the Bills rotated their defensive personnel throughout games. Lawson started several games after Murphy struggled with injuries. He recorded seven tackles in a Week 9 loss to the Chicago Bears. Against the Jacksonville Jaguars in Week 12, Lawson was involved in a fistfight with Jaguars running back Leonard Fournette as part of a brawl that broke out between the two teams in the third quarter. Lawson and Fournette were both ejected from the game for the scuffle, but while Lawson only received a $33,425 fine, Fournette was suspended for one game. Lawson later stated he was defending himself and his teammates and that Fournette initiated the fight.

Against the Miami Dolphins in Week 17, Lawson collected two sacks on Ryan Tannehill in addition to a forced fumble, making this his first career multi-sack game. He finished the 2018 season with much-improved stats, recording 30 combined tackles, four sacks, two fumbles forced, and six passes defended on the year. He was also named by Pro Football Focus to their team of the week after a strong performance against the Detroit Lions in week 15.

==== 2019 ====
On May 1, 2019, the Bills declined the fifth-year option on Lawson's contract, making him a free agent in 2020. Against the Denver Broncos in week 12, Lawson recorded two sacks on quarterback Brandon Allen after Broncos lineman Connor McGovern told Lawson he'd "never heard of him". Lawson finished the season with a career-high 6.5 sacks.

=== Miami Dolphins ===
On March 21, 2020, Lawson signed a three-year, $30 million contract with the Dolphins. He was placed on the reserve/COVID-19 list by the team on August 6, 2020, and activated the next day.

In Week 4 against the Seattle Seahawks, Lawson recorded his first sack as a Dolphin on Russell Wilson during the 31–23 loss. In Week 9, against the Arizona Cardinals, Lawson recovered a fumble forced by teammate Emmanuel Ogbah on Kyler Murray and returned it for a 36-yard touchdown during the 34–31 victory.

=== Houston Texans ===
On March 17, 2021, Lawson and a 2021 sixth-round pick were traded to the Houston Texans in exchange for Benardrick McKinney and a 2021 seventh-round pick.

=== New York Jets ===
On August 29, 2021, the New York Jets traded a 2022 sixth-round pick to the Texans in exchange for Lawson. He was released on January 8, 2022, right before the season finale. He finished the season with 23 tackles and one sack through 14 games and seven starts.

=== Buffalo Bills (second stint) ===
On March 18, 2022, Lawson signed with the Bills on a one-year deal. Lawson had publicly spoken about wanting to return to Buffalo since his release from the Jets. During end of season interviews on January 23, 2023, Lawson said one of his former teams had told him, "Be seen and not heard", and said that coming back to Buffalo had helped get his mental state out of a dark place. During the 2022–23 season, Lawson played in 15 games, recording 31 combined tackles, 3.5 sacks, and a forced fumble.

Lawson re-signed with the Bills on April 18, 2023.

=== Carolina Panthers ===
On October 9, 2024, Lawson was signed to the Carolina Panthers practice squad. He was elevated to the active roster to appear in one game against the Washington Commanders. He was released on October 22.

=== Buffalo Bills (third stint) ===
On November 25, 2025, Lawson was signed to the Buffalo Bills' practice squad after a workout with the team the day prior.

== Career statistics ==
=== NFL ===
Legend
**Bold**	Career high

==== Regular season ====
Year	Team	Games		Tackles							Interceptions						Fumbles				
Year	Team	GP	GS	Cmb	Solo	Ast	TFL	QBH	Sck	Sfty	PD	Int	Yds	Y/I	Lng	TD	FF	FR	Yds	Y/R	TD
2016	BUF	10	1	13	7	6	3	3	2.0	0	1	0	0	—	0	0	1	0	0	—	0
2017	BUF	11	**10**	**33**	17	**16**	4	5	4.0	0	2	0	0	—	0	0	1	0	0	—	0
2018	BUF	14	6	30	18	12	5	12	4.0	0	**5**	0	0	—	0	0	**2**	0	0	—	0
2019	BUF	15	0	32	**21**	11	**13**	**18**	**6.5**	0	2	0	0	—	0	0	1	0	0	—	0
2020	MIA	14	7	32	17	15	4	**18**	4.0	0	1	0	0	—	0	0	1	**1**	**36**	**36.0**	**1**
2021	NYJ	14	7	23	15	8	5	5	1.0	0	2	**1**	**1**	**1.0**	**1**	0	0	**1**	0	0.0	0
2022	BUF	15	6	31	19	12	6	9	3.5	0	1	0	0	—	0	0	1	0	0	—	0
2023	BUF	**16**	1	13	7	6	2	7	1.0	0	0	0	0	—	0	0	0	0	0	—	0
2024	CAR	1	0	0	0	0	0	0	0.0	0	0	0	0	—	0	0	0	0	0	—	0
Career		110	38	207	121	86	42	77	26.0	0	14	1	1	1.0	1	0	7	2	36	18.0	1

==== Postseason ====
Year	Team	Games		Tackles							Interceptions						Fumbles				
Year	Team	GP	GS	Cmb	Solo	Ast	TFL	QBH	Sck	Sfty	PD	Int	Yds	Y/I	Lng	TD	FF	FR	Yds	Y/R	TD
2017	BUF	Did not play due to injury																			
2019	BUF	1	0	2	**2**	0	0	1	0.0	0	0	0	0	—	0	0	0	0	0	—	0
2022	BUF	**2**	**2**	**4**	**2**	**2**	**1**	**2**	0.0	0	0	0	0	—	0	0	0	0	0	—	0
2023	BUF	**2**	0	1	0	1	0	1	0.0	0	0	0	0	—	0	0	0	0	0	—	0
Career		5	2	7	4	3	1	4	0.0	0	0	0	0	—	0	0	0	0	0	—	0

=== College ===
Season	Team	GP	Defense				
Season	Team	GP	Tckl	TfL	Sck	Int	FF
2013	Clemson	13	30	9.5	4.0	0	0
2014	Clemson	12	34	11.5	3.5	0	0
2015	Clemson	15	59	24.5	12.5	0	1
Totals		40	123	45.5	20.0	0	1

== Personal life ==
Lawson's father was killed in a car accident during his junior year of high school. Lawson then chose to attend Clemson University to remain close to his family.

His younger brother, Jahiem Lawson, plays at Clemson.
