= KJ Henry =

American football player (born 1999)

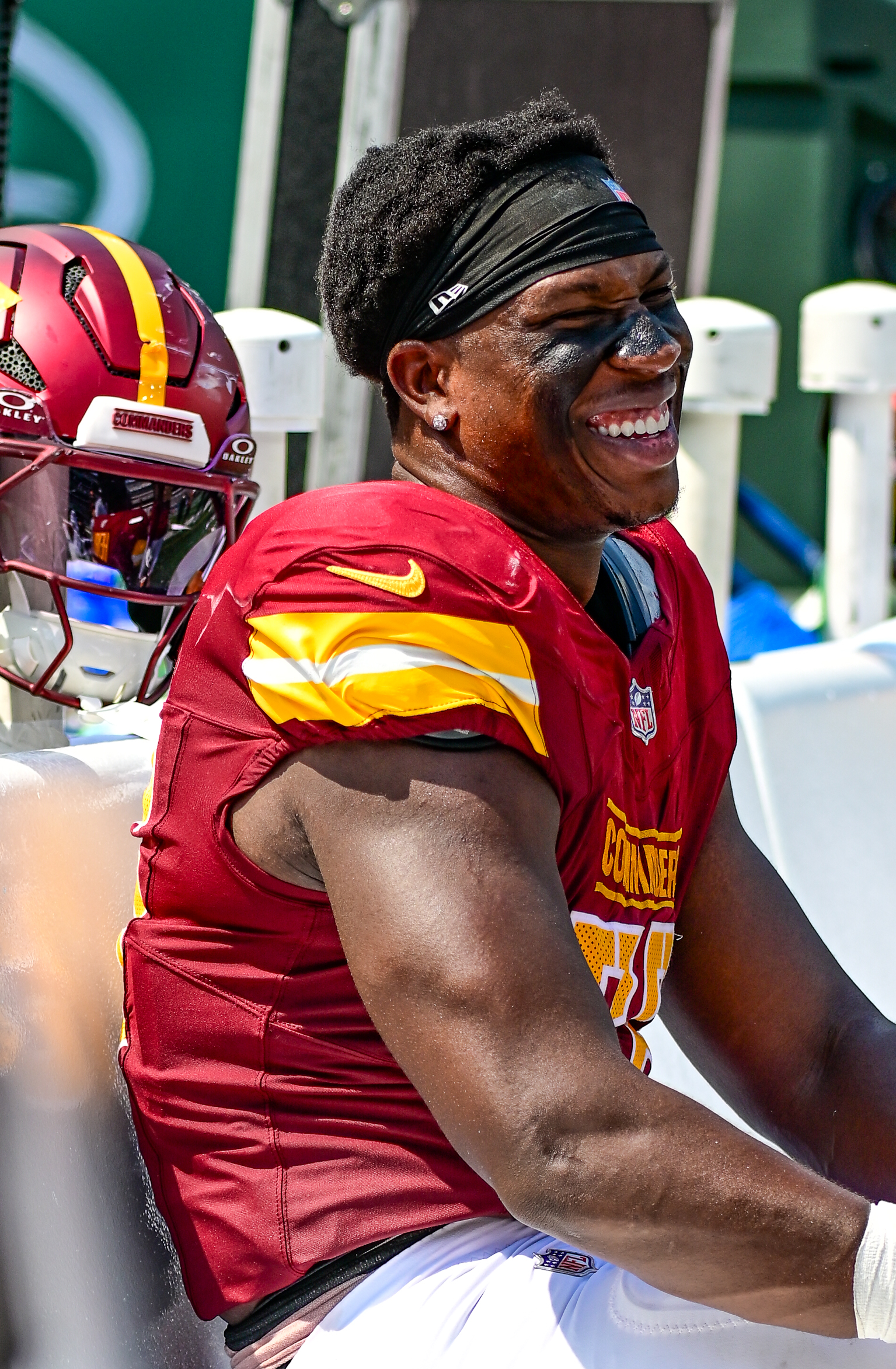
- Henry with the Washington Commanders in 2024

No. 57 – Pittsburgh Steelers
- Position: Defensive end
- Roster status: Active

Personal information
- Born: January 27, 1999 (age 27); Clemmons, North Carolina, U.S.
- Listed height: 6 ft 4 in (1.93 m)
- Listed weight: 255 lb (116 kg)

Career information
- High school: West Forsyth (Clemmons)
- College: Clemson (2018–2022)
- NFL draft: 2023: 5th round, 137th overall pick

Career history
- Washington Commanders (2023); Cincinnati Bengals (2024); Dallas Cowboys (2024); Philadelphia Eagles (2024)*; Cleveland Browns (2025)*; Philadelphia Eagles (2025)*; Pittsburgh Steelers (2025)*; Cleveland Browns (2025); Pittsburgh Steelers (2026)*; San Francisco 49ers (2026)*; Pittsburgh Steelers (2026–present)
- * Offseason or practice squad member only

Awards and highlights
- Super Bowl champion (LIX); CFP national champion (2018); Second-team All-ACC (2022)

Career NFL statistics as of 2025
- Total tackles: 22
- Sacks: 2.5
- Pass deflections: 2
- Stats at Pro Football Reference

Keith Jeremiah Henry (born January 27, 1999) is an American professional football defensive end for the Pittsburgh Steelers of the National Football League (NFL). He played college football for the Clemson Tigers and was selected by the Washington Commanders in the fifth round of the 2023 NFL draft. Henry has also been a member of the Cincinnati Bengals, Dallas Cowboys, Philadelphia Eagles, and Cleveland Browns.

== Early life ==
Henry was born on January 27, 1999, in Athens, Ohio. His father Keith was an assistant coach under Jim Grobe on the Ohio Bobcats football team. Henry's family moved to Winston-Salem, North Carolina, in 2001.

He attended West Forsyth High School in Clemmons, North Carolina, where he had 24 tackles for loss, 12 sacks, and 14 passes deflected as a senior for their football team in 2017. Rated a five-star recruit, he signed a National Letter of Intent to play college football for the Tigers at Clemson University.

== College career ==
Henry played in four games for the Tigers as a freshman before redshirting. He played in all 15 of the Tigers' games as a redshirt freshman, making 22 tackles with two sacks.

As a sophomore, he appeared in 15 games as a backup, registering 22 tackles (4.5 for loss), 2 sacks and 3 passes defensed.

As a junior, he appeared in 13 games (4 starts), collecting 28 tackles, 6.5 tackles for loss, 4.5 sacks, one forced fumble, and one fumble recovery. He earned a degree in sports communication in December 2020 before receiving a Master's Degree in athletic leadership in December 2021.

Henry considered entering the 2022 NFL draft, before opting to return to Clemson for a fifth season. He started all 14 games, tallying 59 tackles (9 for loss), 3.5 sacks, 24 quarterback pressures (led the team), 6 passes defensed, one forced fumble and one fumble recovery. Against Georgia Tech, he had 6 tackles (2.5 for loss), one sack, 5 quarterback pressures and one forced fumble.

=== College statistics ===
Season	Games	Tackles					Fumbles	
Season	Games	Total	Solo	Ast	TFL	Sacks	FF	FR
2018	2	6	5	1	2	0	0	0
2019	11	23	6	17	4.5	2	0	0
2020	10	23	12	11	6	3.5	0	1
2021	11	21	14	7	6.5	4	1	1
2022	14	51	26	25	9	3.5	1	1
Career	48	124	63	61	28	13	2	3

== Professional career ==
Pre-draft measurables
Height	Weight	Arm length	Hand span	Wingspan	40-yard dash	10-yard split	20-yard split	20-yard shuttle	Three-cone drill	Vertical jump	Broad jump
6 ft 4 1/4 in (1.94 m)	251 lb (114 kg)	33 in (0.84 m)	10 in (0.25 m)	6 ft 7 in (2.01 m)	4.63 s	1.65 s	2.66 s	4.45 s	7.47 s	31.5 in (0.80 m)	9 ft 4 in (2.84 m)
All values from NFL Combine/Pro Day

=== Washington Commanders ===
Henry was selected by the Washington Commanders in the fifth round (137th overall) of the 2023 NFL draft. He signed his four-year rookie contract on May 12, 2023. He appeared in 10 games (3 starts), registering 19 tackles (4 for loss), 1.5 sacks and 2 passes defensed.

In 2024, the Commanders hired new head coach Dan Quinn. On August 27, 2024, Henry was released as part of final roster cuts before the start of the season.

=== Cincinnati Bengals ===
On August 28, 2024, Henry was claimed off waivers by the Cincinnati Bengals. He appeared in 2 games as a backup and did not post any stats. He was waived on September 17, and re-signed to the practice squad.

=== Dallas Cowboys ===
On October 1, 2024, Henry was signed by the Dallas Cowboys off the Bengals practice squad. He was acquired to provide depth after defensive end DeMarcus Lawrence was placed on the injured reserve list. He was declared inactive in Week 5 against the Pittsburgh Steelers. He recorded one sack and 3 tackles in the 9–47 loss against the Detroit Lions. He was declared inactive for the games in Week 9, Week 10 and Week 11. He was waived on November 23. He appeared in 2 games as a backup, playing mainly on special teams during his time with the team and was released after defensive end Marshawn Kneeland was activated from injured reserve.

=== Philadelphia Eagles ===
On November 26, 2024, Henry was signed to the Philadelphia Eagles' practice squad. He won a Super Bowl championship when the Eagles defeated the Kansas City Chiefs 40–22 in Super Bowl LIX. Henry signed a reserve/future contract with Philadelphia on February 14, 2025. On July 22, Henry was waived by the Eagles.

=== Cleveland Browns ===
On July 23, 2025, Henry was claimed off waivers by the Cleveland Browns. He was waived on August 24 and re-signed to the practice squad on September 10. On September 23, Henry was released from the practice squad.

=== Philadelphia Eagles (second stint) ===
On October 2, 2025, Henry signed with the Philadelphia Eagles' practice squad, but was released the next day.

=== Pittsburgh Steelers ===
On October 11, 2025, Henry signed with the Pittsburgh Steelers' practice squad. He was waived on November 4.

=== Cleveland Browns (second stint) ===
On November 11, 2025, Henry signed with the Cleveland Browns' practice squad.

=== Pittsburgh Steelers (second stint) ===
On January 14, 2026, Henry signed a reserve/futures contract with the Pittsburgh Steelers. On June 26, he was waived by the Steelers.

=== San Francisco 49ers ===
On July 29, 2026, Henry signed a one-year contract with the San Francisco 49ers. On August 12, Henry was waived by the 49ers with an injury designation.

=== Pittsburgh Steelers (third stint) ===
On October 6, 2026, Henry signed with the Pittsburgh Steelers practice squad. On November 21, he was signed to the active roster.
