= Mauldin High School =

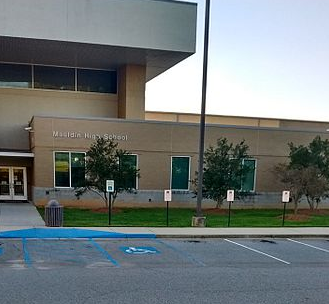
- Front of the school, October 2015

Location
- 701 East Butler Road; Mauldin, South Carolina 29662; United States; 34°47′37″N 82°17′17″W

Information
- Type: Public
- Motto: (Latin: Age Quod Adis) (Finish what you attempt)
- School district: Greenville County School District
- Principal: John Michael Peake
- Teaching staff: 116.70 (on an FTE basis)
- Grades: 9–12
- Enrollment: 2,076 (2026-2027)
- Student to teacher ratio: 19.49
- Colors: Orange, white, and brown
- Nickname: Mavericks
- Newspaper: The Stampede
- Yearbook: Reflections
- Website: www.greenville.k12.sc.us/mauldinh/

Mauldin High School (MHS) is a high school in Mauldin, South Carolina. It serves grades 9–12 and is part of the Greenville County School District.

== Facilities ==
Built in 1973 and renovated in 2002, Mauldin High School features a 676 seat auditorium, centrally-located multi-purpose atrium, media center, computer labs, science labs, and band and choral rooms with practice rooms.

Athletic facilities include a 4,500 seat stadium, two gyms (2462 seats and 800 seats), a weight-room, and various other fields for other sports.

== Demographics ==
The demographic breakdown of the 2,274 students enrolled in 2023–24 was:

- Male – 48.7%
- Female – 51.3%
- Native American/Alaskan – 0.3%
- Asian/Pacific islanders – 3.1%
- Black – 22.9%
- Hispanic – 12.2%
- White – 57.1%
- Multiracial – 4.4%

43.2% of the students were eligible for free or reduced lunch.

== Feeder Schools ==
The primary feeder middle schools of Mauldin High School is Mauldin Middle School. The primary feeder elementary schools of Mauldin High School are Bethel Elementary School, Greenbrier Elementary School, Mauldin Elementary School, and Monarch Elementary School.

== Non-Core Subject Classes ==
In addition to the four traditional core-subject subjects (English, Math, Social Studies, and Science), Mauldin High offers various classes in World Language, Fine Arts, Physical Education, and Career and Technical Education.

=== World Languages ===
Mauldin High School offers two languages in its World Language Department for students to study. Spanish and French.

=== Fine Arts ===
Fine Arts classes at Mauldin High School include art, ceramics, orchestra, band, chorus, and theatre.

=== Career and Technical Education ===
Career and Technical Education classes and/or pathways offered at Mauldin High School include marketing, business, law enforcement, web design, sports management, computer science, health science, aerospace engineering, and agriculture/horticulture.

=== Navy JROTC ===
Navy JROTC is offered at Mauldin High to prepare students who are interested in joining the Navy, or another branch of the military and to serve their communities.

=== Physical Education ===
In addition to Physical Education 1, which is a required course to be taken in South Carolina. The Physical Education department at Mauldin High School include leisure sports, team sports, and weightlifting.

== Athletics ==
The athletic teams at Mauldin compete under the name "Mavericks". They are in the South Carolina High School League 5A Region 1. The following sports are offered:

Sports offered at Mauldin High School
Boys	Girls
Cross Country	Competitive Cheer
Football	Cross Country
Swimming	Golf
Volleyball	Swimming
Basketball	Tennis
Wrestling	Volleyball
Baseball	Basketball
Golf	Wrestling
Lacrosse	Lacrosse
Soccer	Soccer
Tennis	Softball

Mauldin High School broadcasts select sporting events from the student run Mauldin High Broadcast Network. MHBN was formed in 2015 and is one of the few student-run networks in South Carolina.

== Student Clubs and Organizations ==
Student Clubs and Organizations at Mauldin High School include an Academic Team, Atlas Club, Beta Club, Chess Club, Chick-fil-A Leader Academy, DECA, Fellowship of Christian Athletes (FCA), Future Farmers of America (FFA), French National Honor Society, High School Democrats of America, Interact Club, Key Club, Minds Matter, Model United Nations, Mu Alpha Theta, National Honor Society, Robotics Team, Student Council, Thespian Honor Society, and Youth in Government.

== Notable alumni ==
- Justin Dean (2015) — MLB outfielder
- Kevin Garnett (transferred to Farragut Career Academy in Chicago, IL) — retired NBA player, NBA champion and 15-time All-Star, member of the Basketball Hall of Fame
- Orlando Jones — actor
- Jeadyn Lukus (2022) — college football player
- Dru Phillips (2020) — American football player
- Bryce Teodosio (2017) — MLB Outfielder
- Scott Wingo (2007) — MLB second baseman
- Madison Younginer (2009) — MLB pitcher
