= Jahiem Lawson =

American football player (born 2004)

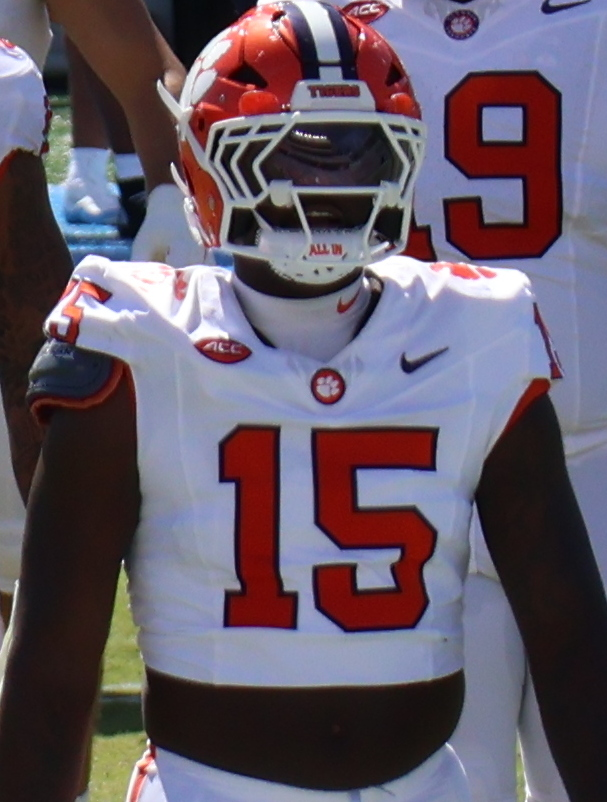
- Lawson in 2025

No. 15 – Clemson Tigers
- Position: Defensive end
- Class: Junior

Personal information
- Born: January 22, 2004 (age 22)
- Listed height: 6 ft 2 in (1.88 m)
- Listed weight: 255 lb (116 kg)

Career information
- High school: D. W. Daniel (Central, South Carolina)
- College: Clemson (2022–present)
- Stats at ESPN

Jahiem Lawson (born January 22, 2004) is an American college football defensive end for the Clemson Tigers.

== Early life ==
Lawson attended D. W. Daniel High School in Central, South Carolina. During his high school career he had 153 tackles, 25 sacks, one interception and two touchdowns. He committed to Clemson University to play college football.

== College career ==
Lawson appeared in one game and redshirted his first year at Clemson in 2022 and played in four games in 2023. In 2024, he started four of 14 games and had 29 tackles and one sack. Lawson earned more playing time his junior year in 2025.

=== Statistics ===
College statistics
Year	Team	Games	Tackles				
Year	Team	Games	Total	Solo	Ast	TFL	Sacks
2022	Clemson	1	0	0	0	0.0	0.0
2023	Clemson	4	2	1	1	1.0	0.0
2024	Clemson	14	24	7	17	3.5	1.0
2025	Clemson	11	20	11	9	6.5	3.5
Career		30	46	19	27	11.0	4.5

== Personal life ==
His brother, Shaq Lawson, also played at Clemson and in the NFL.
