= Jarvis Jenkins =

American football player (born 1988)

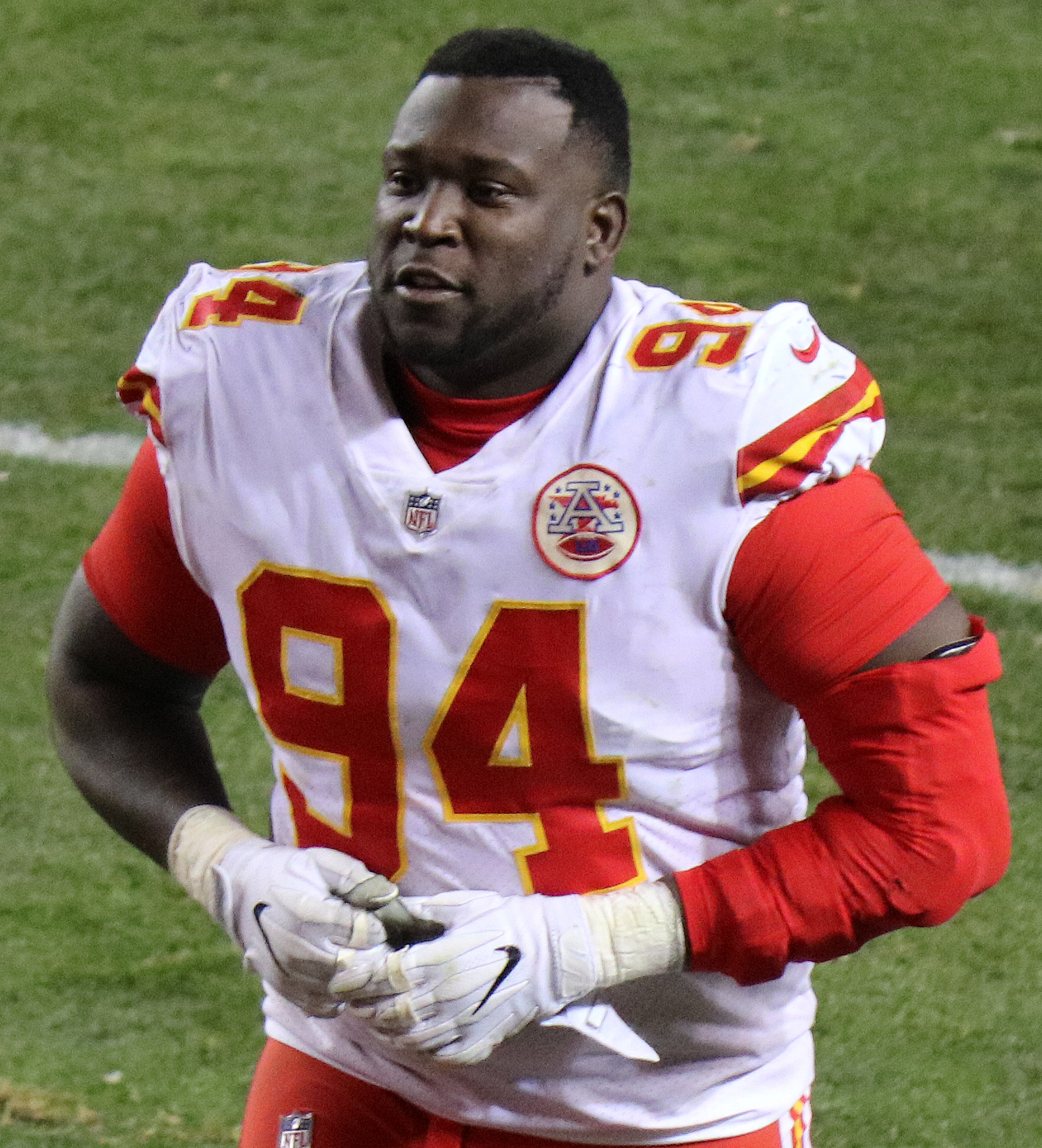
- Jenkins with the Kansas City Chiefs in 2017

No. 99, 96, 98, 94
- Position: Defensive end

Personal information
- Born: April 24, 1988 (age 38); Clemson, South Carolina, U.S.
- Listed height: 6 ft 4 in (1.93 m)
- Listed weight: 300 lb (136 kg)

Career information
- High school: D. W. Daniel (Central, South Carolina)
- College: Clemson
- NFL draft: 2011: 2nd round, 41st overall pick

Career history
- Washington Redskins (2011–2014); Chicago Bears (2015); New York Jets (2016); Kansas City Chiefs (2016–2018)

Awards and highlights
- First-team All-ACC (2010)

Career NFL statistics
- Total tackles: 137
- Sacks: 7.0
- Stats at Pro Football Reference

Jarvis Jenkins (born April 24, 1988) is an American former professional football player who was a defensive end in the National Football League (NFL). He was selected by the Washington Redskins in the second round of the 2011 NFL draft. He played college football at Clemson University.

== Early life ==
Jenkins attended D. W. Daniel High School in Central, South Carolina. He was named as an All-American by PrepStar as a senior where he had 79 tackles and four blocked kicks. He was named the South Carolina Coaches Association Upperstate AAA Lineman-of-the-Year, Daily Journal/Messenger Player-of-the-Year and was an AP All-State.

Jenkins was also a two-time All-region pick in basketball and was named All-region in the shot put (46-feet, 6-inches) and discus (111-feet, 10-inches).

Jenkins was rated as the 27th defensive tackle in the nation, and number one player in the state of South Carolina by Rivals.com. He was a member of the Rivals 250.

== College career ==
He played college football at Clemson.

== Professional career ==
=== Pre-draft ===
He was considered one of the better defensive tackle prospects for the 2011 NFL draft.

Pre-draft measurables
Height	Weight	Arm length	Hand span	Wingspan	40-yard dash	10-yard split	20-yard split	20-yard shuttle	Three-cone drill	Vertical jump	Broad jump	Bench press
6 ft 4 in (1.93 m)	310 lb (141 kg)	33 1/4 in (0.84 m)	9 1/2 in (0.24 m)	6 ft 9 in (2.06 m)	4.93 s	1.83 s	2.89 s	4.75 s	7.42 s	27.0 in (0.69 m)	8 ft 7 in (2.62 m)	21 reps
All values from NFL Combine/Pro Day

=== Washington Redskins ===
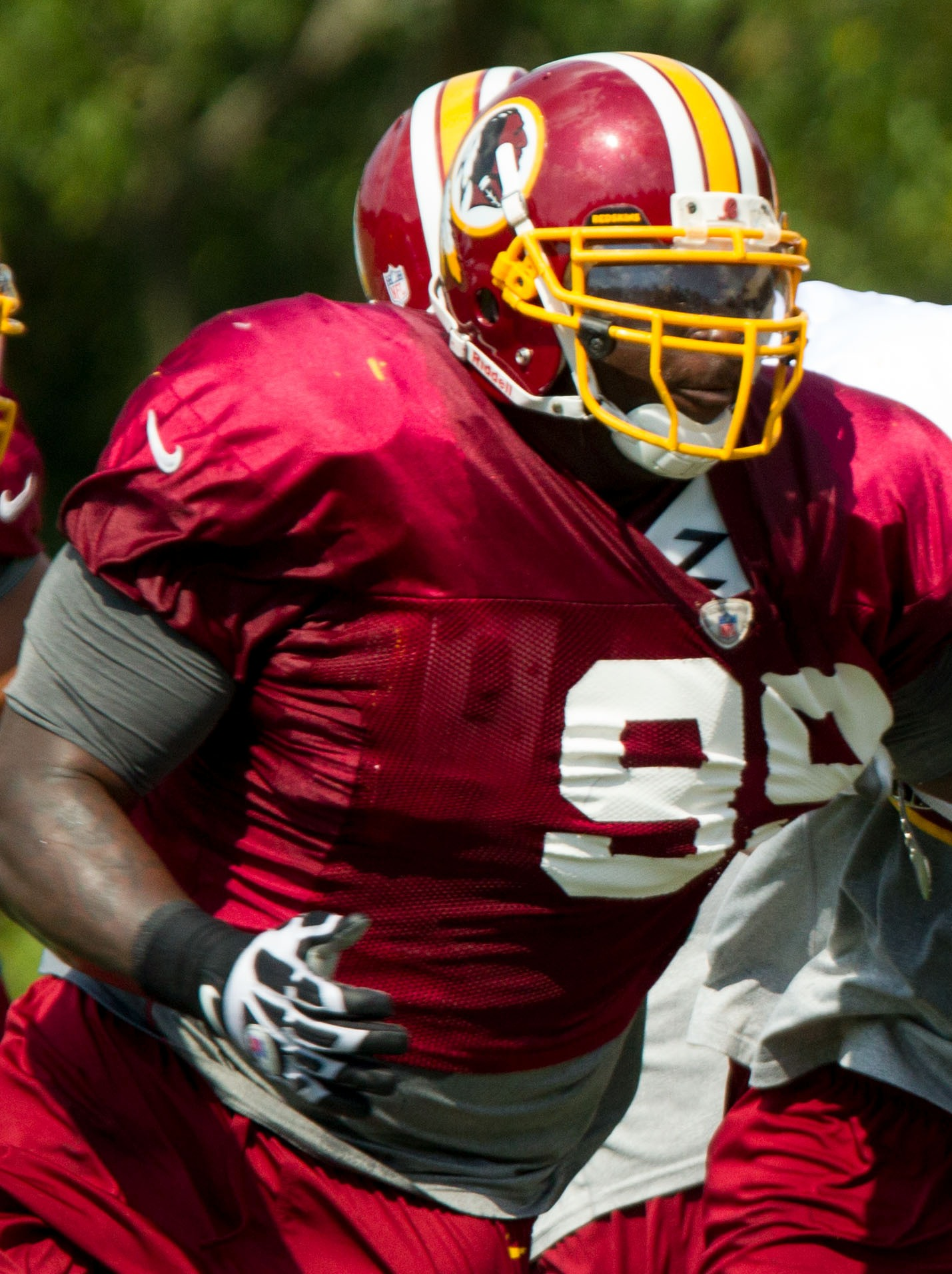
Jenkins with the Washington Redskins in 2012

Jenkins was selected ninth in the second round, 41st overall, by the Washington Redskins in the 2011 NFL draft. The Redskins signed Jenkins to a four-year, $4.783 million contract with a $1.978 million signing bonus on July 29, 2011. Jenkins missed the entire 2011 season after tearing his ACL in a preseason game against the Baltimore Ravens, spending his entire rookie season on injured reserve.

After seven months of rehabilitation, Jenkins was cleared to play on April 11, 2012. He made his NFL debut in the 2012 season opener against the New Orleans Saints. After Adam Carriker was placed on injured reserve, Jenkins had his first career start in Week 3 against the Cincinnati Bengals.

On July 28, 2013, it was announced that Jenkins would be suspended for the first four games of the 2013 season due to violating the league's substance policy. In Week 11, he recorded his first half a sack against the Philadelphia Eagles. The following week, he recorded a full sack on quarterback Colin Kaepernick of the San Francisco 49ers.

=== Chicago Bears ===
On March 24, 2015, Jenkins signed a one-year deal with the Chicago Bears. In fifteen starts, Jenkins recorded a career-best 32 tackles, four sacks and six tackles-for-loss.

=== New York Jets ===
On March 16, 2016, Jenkins signed a two-year, $7 million deal with the New York Jets. He was released by the Jets on November 9, 2016.

=== Kansas City Chiefs ===
On November 14, 2016, Jenkins signed with the Kansas City Chiefs.

On March 22, 2017, Jenkins re-signed with the Chiefs.

On March 14, 2018, Jenkins re-signed with the Chiefs. He played in 12 games in 2018 before being waived by the Chiefs on December 7, 2018.

=== Season statistics ===
Season		Games		Tackles				Fumbles				Interceptions						Other	
Year	Team	GP	GS	COMB	SOLO	AST	SACK	FF	FR	YDs	TD	INT	YDs	AVG	LNG	TD	PD	STF	YDS
2012	WAS	16	14	25	11	14	0.0	0	0	0	0	0	0	0	0	0	0	2	5
2013	WAS	12	5	22	12	10	2.0	0	0	0	0	0	0	0	0	0	0	0	0
2014	WAS	16	14	28	18	10	0.0	0	0	0	0	0	0	0	0	0	0	3	5
2015	CHI	15	15	32	22	10	4.0	0	0	8	0	0	0	0	0	0	1	1	1
2016	NYJ	9	1	9	7	2	0.0	0	0	0	0	0	0	0	0	0	0	0	0
2016	KC	7	0	5	5	0	0.0	0	0	0	0	0	0	0	0	0	0	0	0
2017	KC	11	1	10	8	2	1.0	0	0	0	0	0	0	0	0	0	0	1	1
2018	KC	12	0	6	4	2	0	0	0	0	0	0	0	0	0	0	0	0	0
Career		98	50	137	87	50	7.0	0	0	0	0	0	0	0	0	0	1	7	12
