= Marq Cerqua =

American football player (born 1977)

No. 58, 54, 49
- Position: Linebacker

Personal information
- Born: April 3, 1977 (age 49); Greenville, South Carolina, U.S.
- Listed height: 6 ft 2 in (1.88 m)
- Listed weight: 223 lb (101 kg)

Career information
- High school: D. W. Daniel (SC)
- College: Carson–Newman
- NFL draft: 2001: undrafted

Career history
- Tampa Bay Buccaneers (2001); Dallas Cowboys (2001); Chicago Bears (2002); Indianapolis Colts (2003)*; Dallas Cowboys (2005)*
- * Offseason or practice squad member only

Awards and highlights
- Second-team All-SAC (1999); All-SAC (2000)

Career NFL statistics
- Games played: 5
- Stats at Pro Football Reference

Marq Vincent Cerqua (born April 3, 1977) is an American former professional football player who was a linebacker in the National Football League (NFL) for the Tampa Bay Buccaneers, Dallas Cowboys, Chicago Bears and Indianapolis Colts. He played college football for the Carson–Newman Eagles.

== Early life ==
Cerqua attended D. W. Daniel High School, where he practiced football and track.

He accepted a football scholarship from Furman University, where he was named the starter at fullback. As a freshman, he registered 515 rushing yards and 6 touchdowns, although he was suspended for one game for violating team rules. He rushed for 120 yards and 4 touchdowns against Western Carolina University.

As a sophomore, he started the first 6 games, collecting 242 rushing yards and 4 touchdowns, before being dismissed from the football team for violating team rules in November.

He transferred to Carson–Newman University and sat out the 1998 season to comply with transfer rules. He was converted into a linebacker and was a two-year starter.

== Professional career ==
=== Tampa Bay Buccaneers ===
Cerqua was signed as an undrafted free agent by the Tampa Bay Buccaneers after the 2001 NFL draft on April 23. He played mainly on special teams, before being waived on December 23.

=== Dallas Cowboys (first stint) ===
In December 2001, he was signed as a free agent by the Dallas Cowboys. He was declared inactive for the last 2 games. He wasn't re-signed after the season.

=== Chicago Bears ===
In 2002, he was signed by the Chicago Bears to their practice squad. On December 20, he was promoted to the active roster. He wasn't re-signed after the season.

=== Indianapolis Colts ===
On August 19, 2003, he was signed as a free agent by the Indianapolis Colts. He was released on August 26. On October 8, he was signed to the practice squad. On October 30, he was placed on the non-football injury list, after being stricken with a viral infection. He wasn't re-signed after the season.

=== Dallas Cowboys (second stint) ===
In January 2005, he was signed by the Dallas Cowboys to be allocated to the Cologne Centurions of NFL Europe on January 31. He was injured and released before the start of the season.
