= Toriano Pride Jr. =

American football player (born 2003)

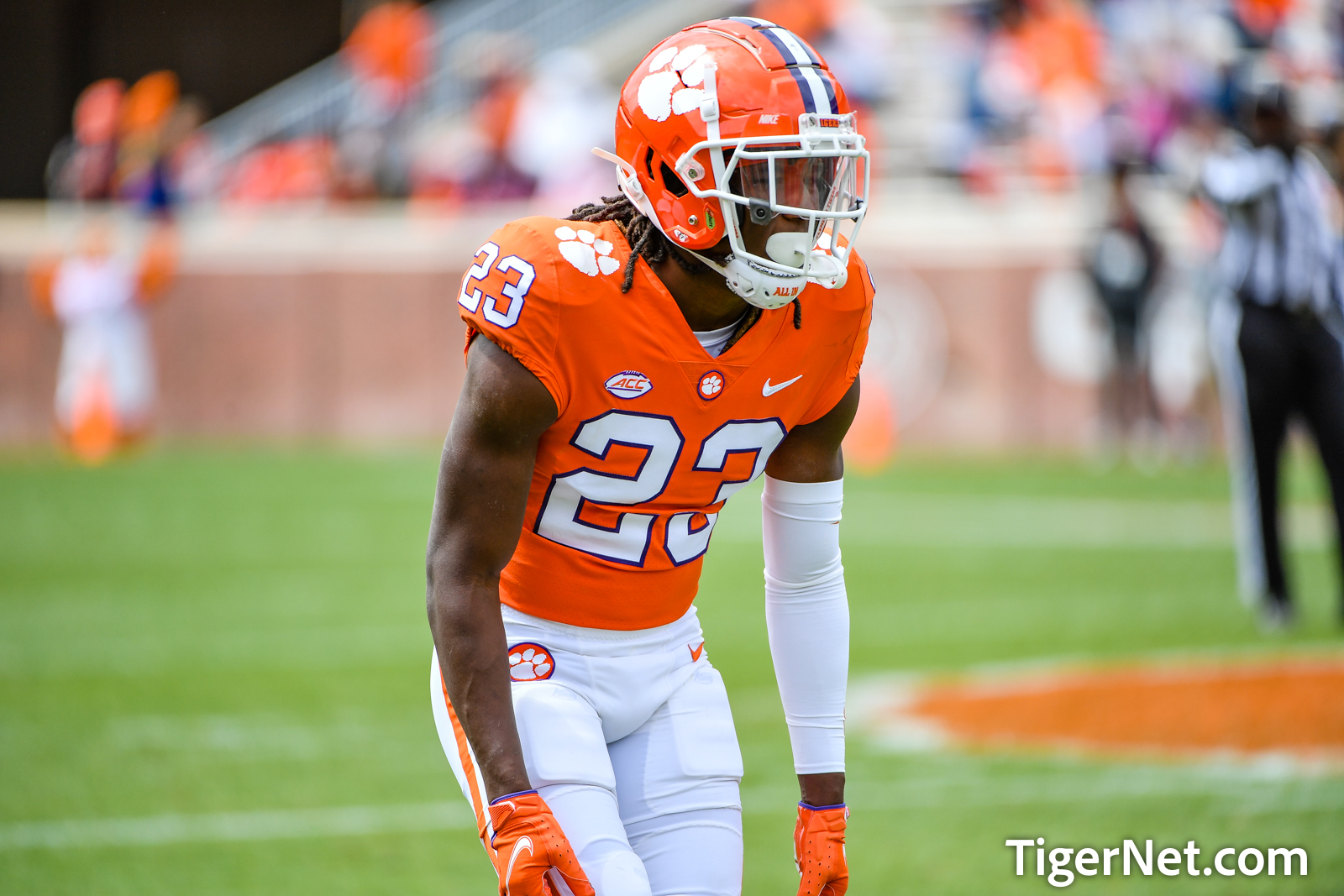
- Pride with the Clemson Tigers in 2022

No. 35 – Cleveland Browns
- Position: Cornerback
- Roster status: Active

Personal information
- Born: December 18, 2003 (age 22); St. Louis, Missouri, U.S.
- Listed height: 5 ft 10 in (1.78 m)
- Listed weight: 185 lb (84 kg)

Career information
- High school: East St. Louis (East St. Louis, Illinois)
- College: Clemson (2022–2023); Missouri (2024–2025)
- NFL draft: 2026: 7th round, 220th overall pick

Career history
- Buffalo Bills (2026)*; Cleveland Browns (2026–present)
- * Offseason or practice squad member only

Career NFL statistics as of Week 3, 2026
- Games played: 1
- Stats at Pro Football Reference

Toriano Pride Jr. (born December 18, 2003) is an American professional football cornerback for the Cleveland Browns of the National Football League (NFL). He played college football for the Clemson Tigers and the Missouri Tigers and was selected by the Buffalo Bills in the seventh round of the 2026 NFL Draft.

== Early life ==
Pride attended East St. Louis Senior High School. He was rated as a four-star recruit, the 10th best cornerback, and the 71st overall player in the class of 2022, and committed to play college football for the Clemson Tigers over offers such as Auburn, Missouri, Ohio State, and Oregon.

== College career ==
=== Clemson ===
In week 5 of the 2022 season, Pride recorded his first career interception in a win over NC State. He finished his freshman season in 2022 with two starts in 14 appearances, tallying 23 tackles, four pass deflections, a sack, an interception and a safety. In week 7 of the 2023 season, Pride tallied seven tackles and three pass deflections in a win over Wake Forest. In the 2023 season, he recorded 14 tackles with one going for a loss, and four pass deflections. After the 2023 season, Pride entered his name into the NCAA transfer portal.

In Pride's career with the Tigers he played in 26 games while making three starts where he notched 36 tackles with two being for a loss, nine pass break ups, and an interception.

=== Missouri ===
After two season with Clemson, Pride transferred to play for the Missouri Tigers.

== Professional career ==
Pre-draft measurables
| Height | Weight | Arm length | Hand span | Wingspan | 40-yard dash | 10-yard split | 20-yard split | 20-yard shuttle | Three-cone drill | Vertical jump | Broad jump | Bench press |
|---|---|---|---|---|---|---|---|---|---|---|---|---|
| 5 ft 10 3/8 in (1.79 m) | 185 lb (84 kg) | 31 in (0.79 m) | 9 1/4 in (0.23 m) | 6 ft 3 7/8 in (1.93 m) | 4.32 s | 1.51 s | 2.53 s | 4.37 s | 7.20 s | 37.5 in (0.95 m) | 10 ft 8 in (3.25 m) | 13 reps |
All values from NFL Combine/Pro Day

=== Buffalo Bills ===
Pride was selected by the Buffalo Bills in the seventh round with the 220th overall pick of the 2026 NFL Draft. On August 30, 2026, Pride was waived by the Bills as a part of final roster cuts.

=== Cleveland Browns ===
On August 31, 2026, Pride was claimed off of waivers by the Cleveland Browns.
