= Fincha Airport =

Airport in Ethiopia

- IATA: FNH; ICAO: HAFN

Summary
- Airport type: Public
- Serves: Fincha
- Elevation AMSL: 7,600 ft / 2,316 m
- Coordinates: 9°35′00″N 37°22′35″E

Map
- Location of the airport in Ethiopia

Runways
Direction	Length		Surface
Direction	ft	m	Surface
05/23	4,590	1,400	Dirt
- Source: Google Maps

Fincha Airport (IATA: FNH, ICAO: HAFN) is a public airport serving the town of Fincha in western Oromia Region of Ethiopia.

The airport lies at an elevation of 7,600 feet (2,316 m) above mean sea level.

== See also ==
- Transport in Ethiopia
