= D. W. Daniel High School =

Public school in South Carolina, United States

- Blue and gold crest of D. W. Daniel High School

Location
- 140 Blue and Gold Boulevard; Central, South Carolina postal address 29630; United States; 34°44′20.5″N 82°49′48.4″W

Information
- School type: Public
- Motto: E Tribus Unum (One out of three)
- Opened: August 1955 (71 years ago)
- School district: Pickens County School District (SDPC)
- NCES District ID: 4503330
- Authority: South Carolina Department of Education (SCDE)
- NCES School ID: 450333000899
- Principal: Adam Russell
- Teaching staff: 65.50 (FTE)
- Grades: 9–12
- Enrollment: 1,216 (2023–2024)
- Student to teacher ratio: 18.56
- Classes offered: Regular, Advanced Placement and AP
- Campus size: 92.78 acres (37.55 ha)
- Colors: Columbia blue and gold
- Athletics conference: AAA Upper State
- Mascot: Lion
- Team name: Daniel Lions
- Accreditation: AdvancED (1966–)
- USNWR ranking: 1734 (USA); 12 (SC)
- Communities served: Central, Clemson, Six Mile
- Affiliation: South Carolina High School League
- Website: dhs.pickens.k12.sc.us

D. W. Daniel High School (or Daniel High School) is a comprehensive public high school serving students in grades nine through twelve in unincorporated Pickens County, South Carolina, with a Central postal address. Besides Central, it also serves Clemson and Six Mile. It is one of the four high schools administered by the School District of Pickens County (SDPC) (or Pickens 01). The Daniel Lions football team is a multiple-time 3A state champion in the SCHSL.

Its attendance boundary includes Central, the City of Clemson, and Clemson University.

== History ==
D. W. Daniel High School was named for educator David Wistar Daniel (1867–1961), who taught in public schools for nine years and then taught English for 49 years at Clemson College and eventually served as the Dean of the School of Arts and Sciences there.

Daniel High was established in 1955 to consolidate three rural high schools: Central, Clemson and Six Mile. Hence arose the school's motto of E Tribus Unum (Latin: one, out of three).

A new school building replaced the old one in 2012. It was built on the property that had the old building. On June 14 of that year, after the end of the school term, the previous facility was razed.

== Campus ==
The facility is at the intersection of South Carolina Highway 133 and Six Mile Highway.

The original 64.7 acres (26.2 ha) campus site served the community until construction of new US$36,691,453 facilities that began in June 2010. The new 227,950 square feet (21,177 m^{2}) academic facilities and its 92.78 acres (37.55 ha) campus opened for the start of the 2012–13 school year at the same campus location as the old facility. The new Daniel High School is built with administration and guidance areas, cafeteria and kitchen, media center, gymnasiums, auditorium and fine arts facilities designed to handle expected growth and to allow for constructing more classrooms if the projected growth occurs. The 2012 building has athletics and fine arts facilities on the first floor, while classrooms are on the second and third floors.

A new Daniel High School Stadium was opened August 2011 on a 23 acres (9.3 ha) tract next to the original Daniel High School. The new football stadium will seat approximately 5,300 people.

== Academics ==
The assumed course of study follows the curriculum developed the South Carolina Department of Education (SCDE), which requires students to complete 24 credit units before graduation. Students engage in regular and Advanced Placement (AP) coursework and exams. The school is accredited by the SCDE and has been accredited by AdvancED (formerly Southern Association of Colleges and Schools) since 1966.

In 2012, D. W. Daniel High School was nationally recognized with the Silver Award by the U.S. News & World Report in its ranking of Best High Schools across the nation. Daniel was ranked the No. 3 high school in South Carolina and No. 692 in the United States.

Daniel is ranked No. 1191 (2011) and No. 2027 (2013) in the nation of schools evaluated in the Challenge Index, with index scores of 1.620 and 1.062, respectively.

== Extracurricular activities ==
The Daniel High School mascot and athletic emblem is the lion with school colors of Columbia blue and gold.

=== Athletics ===
The Daniel Lions participate in various interscholastic activities in the AAA League (Upper State) administered by the South Carolina High School League SCHSL). The school athletic activities include baseball, basketball (boys/girls), competitive cheer, cross country (boys/girls), football, golf (boys/girls), soccer (boys/girls), softball, swimming and diving (boys/girls), tennis (boys/girls), track and field (boys/girls), and volleyball.

Football games are played at Singleton Field named for Dick Singleton, who served as coach and athletic director.

The Lions have won numerous state championships and runner-up titles throughout its history, including:

- Football: State champions (1966 (2A); 1991, 1992, 1995, 1998, 2020, 2021, 2023 (3A))

3A State Runner-Up (1988, 1997, 2013)

- Boys' basketball: State champion (1965–66, 1966–67 (2A); 2009–10 (3A))
- Girls' basketball: State finalist (1996–97, 2009–10 (3A))
- Baseball: State champion in 1968 (2A), state runner-up in 1967 (2A)
- Boys' cross country: State champions (1998, 2012 (2A)), state runner-up (1991, 1996, 2000 (2A))
- Girls' cross country: State champions (1999, 2000, 2005, 2006, 2007, 2017, 2018 (3A)), state runner-up (1997, 1998, 2004, 2009, 2016 (3A))
- Competitive cheer: State champions in 1998 (3A), state runner-up in 2007
- Boys' Golf: State runner-up in 1995 (3A)
- Girls golf: State champions (2018, 2019 (AAAA)), state runner-up in 2017 (AAAA)
- Boys' soccer: State champions (1980, 1982, 1997, 2003, 2022, 2023 (3A)), state runner-up in 1981 (3A)
- Softball: Upper State champion in 2012 (3A)
- Boys' tennis: State champion in 1981 (3A), state runner-up in 1982 (3A)
- Girls' tennis: State champion (1979, 1980, 1981, 1982 (4A)), state runner-up (1978, 1985, 1998, 2001 (4A))
- Boys' track & field: State champion (1956, 1959 (A); 2013 (AAA)), state runner-up (1957, 1958 (A); 1964 (AA); 1996, 2010, 2014 (AAA))
- Girls' track & field: State champion (2005 and 2013 (3A)), state runner-up (2001, 2004, 2007, 2008, 2014 (3A))
- Volleyball: State champion (1990, 1996, 1997, 1999, 2009), state runner-up (1986, 1989, 1991, 1992, 2003)
- Marching Band: (2019, 2022, 2023, 2024, 2025, 2026) SCBDA 3A state champion

== Notable people ==
The following are notable people associated with D. W. Daniel High School. If the person was a Daniel High School student, the number in parentheses indicates the year of graduation; if the person was a faculty or staff member, that person's title and years of association are included.

Students (Athletic)

- Marq Cerqua – former NFL player
- Larry Craig – former NFL player
- Pete Maravich (attended 1961–63) – American professional basketball player with Atlanta Hawks, New Orleans/Utah Jazz and Boston Celtics; Basketball Hall of Fame inductee; Louisiana State University; (also attended Needham B. Broughton High School). Member of D.W. Daniel Athletic Hall of Fame.
- Jarvis Jenkins (2008) – Former American professional football player, formerly of the Kansas City Chiefs, 2011 2nd round draft pick from Clemson University.
- DeAndre Hopkins (2010) – American professional football player, Houston Texans, Arizona Cardinals, Tennessee Titans, and Kansas City Chiefs, 2013 1st round draft pick from Clemson University.
- DeShawn Williams (2011) – American professional football player, and currently signed with the Carolina Panthers. Formerly of the Denver Broncos; played collegiate football at Clemson University.
- Shaq Lawson (2012) – American professional football player, 2016 Buffalo Bills 1st round draft pick from Clemson University.
- Jahiem Lawson (2022) – American college football player, Clemson

Students (Non-Athletic)

- Walter T. Cox III (1960) – South Carolina state and United States federal judge.
- Lindsey Graham (1973) – United States Senator (Rep) from South Carolina (2003–2026).
- Darline Graham (1982) – United States Senator from South Carolina (2026-present).
- Benjy Bronk (1985) – Head Writer on The Howard Stern Show (1998–Present)
- Blake Whiten (2022) – Country singer
