= TJ Dottery =

American football player (born 2003)

No. 6 – LSU Tigers
- Position: Linebacker
- Class: (redshirt) Senior

Personal information
- Born: December 22, 2003 (age 22)
- Listed height: 6 ft 2 in (1.88 m)
- Listed weight: 225 lb (102 kg)

Career information
- High school: Montgomery Catholic Prep (Montgomery, Alabama)
- College: Clemson (2022); Ole Miss (2023–2025); LSU (2026–present)
- Stats at ESPN

TJ Dottery (born TJ Dudley; December 22, 2003) is an American college football linebacker for the LSU Tigers. He previously played for the Clemson Tigers and Ole Miss Rebels.

== Early life ==
TJ Dottery was born on December 22, 2003, as TJ Dudley. Dudley attended Montgomery Catholic Preparatory School in Montgomery, Alabama. Over the course of his high school career, he recorded 381 tackles, 10.5 sacks, and seven interceptions. A four-star recruit, Dudley committed to play college football at Clemson University over offers from Florida, LSU, and Oregon.

== College career ==
Dudley earned a redshirt in 2022 after appearing in four games and recording two tackles. In July 2023, he was dismissed from Clemson's football team for violating team rules and subsequently entered the transfer portal.

On July 28, 2023, Dudley announced his decision to transfer to the University of Mississippi to play for the Ole Miss Rebels. Due to NCAA transfer rules, Dudley was ineligible to play during the 2023 regular season but was granted eligibility for the 2023 Peach Bowl, where he recorded two tackles in his Ole Miss debut. Prior to the 2024 season, Dudley changed his surname to Dottery, his father's surname. Dottery became a key contributor on defense in 2024 and was named SEC Co-Defensive Player of the Week after recording five tackles, 1.5 tackles for loss, and a forced fumble in a win over Arkansas. He finished the 2024 season with 76 tackles, two sacks, and a forced fumble. In 2025, Dottery started 15 games and led the conference with 98 tackles as the Rebels made the College Football Playoff for the first time in program history. On January 15, 2026, he entered the transfer portal for a second time.

On January 16, 2026, Dottery announced his decision to transfer to Louisiana State University to play for the LSU Tigers, following head coach Lane Kiffin.
