= Montgomery Catholic Preparatory School =

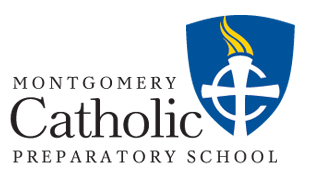

Location
- 5350 Vaughn Road; Montgomery, Alabama 36116; United States; 32°20′28″N 86°12′58″W

Information
- Type: Private, Coeducational
- Religious affiliation: Roman Catholic
- Established: 1873 (153 years ago)
- Founder: Sisters of Loretto
- School district: Roman Catholic Archdiocese of Mobile
- CEEB code: 011880
- President: Justin Castanza
- Principal: Eileen Aaron
- Chaplain: Fr. Joseph Schultz
- Grades: PK–12
- Enrolment: 780
- Average class size: 22
- Student to teacher ratio: 15:1
- Colors: Blue and gold
- Song: Go Big Blue!
- Mascot: Knight
- Team name: Knights
- Accreditation: Southern Association of Colleges and Schools
- Tuition: $7,800 - $11,700
- Affiliation: National Catholic Educational Association
- Website: www.montgomerycatholic.org

Montgomery Catholic Preparatory School (MCPS) is a private, coeducational, K–12 Catholic school in Montgomery, Alabama, United States. It is governed by the Roman Catholic Archdiocese of Mobile. It was founded in 1873, making it the oldest continuously operating non-public K–12 school in Alabama. The school became Montgomery Catholic High in 1952 and adopted its current name following a regionalization and consolidation of Catholic schools in the Montgomery area in 2004.

== History ==
Founded as St. Mary's of Loretto in 1873 as an all-girls school by the Sisters of Loretto, it became co-ed in 1929 and a diocesan school in 1952, when it was renamed Montgomery Catholic High. As part of a regionalization plan approved by Archbishop Oscar H. Lipscomb in 2001, it merged with St. Bede Catholic Elementary School (K-8) and Our Lady Queen of Mercy Elementary School (K-8) to become Montgomery Catholic Preparatory School. In 2004 it opened a middle school for grades 7-8, and in 2012, it opened Holy Spirit Elementary School.

== Academics ==
MCPS is a college preparatory school, offering both an honors and regular program to its students. In the high school honors program, students may take upper level electives, such as Advanced Placement courses in American history, calculus, English, biology, physics, computer science, and fine arts, as well as honors courses in chemistry, British literature, algebra II, trigonometry, Latin II, and Spanish III, among others. Between thirty and forty percent of its graduates receive scholarship offers to colleges around the United States. Four years of religion, social studies, science, mathematics and English are required for all students. Electives include offerings in band, physical education, art, computer applications, HTML design, Latin, and Spanish, among others.

== Facilities ==
Montgomery Catholic Preparatory School (MCPS) operates three campuses in east Montgomery, Alabama. The St. Bede campus, located at the corner of Atlanta Highway and Perry Hill Road, and the Holy Spirit campus at 8580 Vaughn Road, serve students in grades K4 through 6. The middle school and high school campus, located at 5350 Vaughn Road, serves grades 7 through 12.

The St. Bede campus includes two academic buildings, a Family Life Center with daycare facilities, meeting rooms, a gymnasium, a fine arts building, a soccer field, a playground, and a church. The Holy Spirit campus, opened on August 12, 2012, consists of a two-story building with 16 classrooms. Both elementary campuses provide instruction in core subjects along with classes in art, music, library, and computers.

The middle school and high school campus includes a high school academic building, a cafeteria and multi-purpose hall, a science and library building, a gymnasium with a weight room and locker rooms (completed in 2019), classrooms for performing arts and band, and a separate middle school building. Outdoor facilities include a football and soccer stadium, baseball and softball fields, a practice field, a fieldhouse, and a concessions area.

== Notable alumni ==
- Ousmane Cisse (born 1982), Malian professional basketball player
- Jeremiah Cobb (born 2004), American college football player
- TJ Dottery (born 2003), American college football player
- De'Teri Mayes (born 1974), Austrian-American professional basketball player
