= Felt, Not Heard =

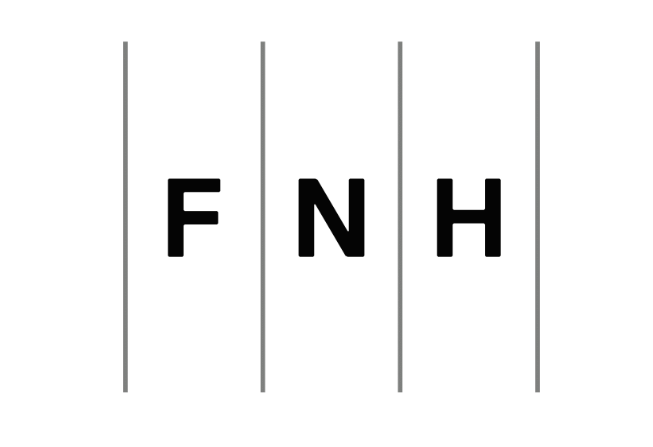
- Company logo
- Company type: Private
- Industry: Motion picture; Audio
- Founded: 2008; 18 years ago
- Founder: Joe Johnson
- Headquarters: New York City, United States
- Key people: Joe Johnson
- Services: Sound design; music composition; audio production
- Website: www.fnh.mx

Felt, Not Heard (shortened to FNH) is an American studio company specializing in sound design, musical composition, and audio production. It was founded by composer Joe Johnson in 2008, and is headquartered in New York City.

Since its founding, FNH has built a broad portfolio of clients across the film, TV, tech, fashion, and media space. The studio’s credits include award-winning brands and rebrands, live performances, commercials, and Emmy-nominated compositions. In 2011, Mr. Johnson was awarded with the Art Director's Club Young Gun[3] award which "recognizes the vanguard of creative professionals 30 years of age and under."

== Logo design ==
The name originates from the foundational role of bass in music, an element that’s rarely front and center, but essential to the whole. The logo for Felt, Not Heard was created by long time collaborator Mitch Paone of DIA. The four lines to represent a bass instrument's four strings and faders on a mixer.
