= Wes Goodwin =

American football coach (born 1984)

Current position
- Title: Assistant linebackers and outside linebackers coach
- Team: Oklahoma
- Conference: SEC

Biographical details
- Born: December 28, 1984 (age 41); Grove Hill, Alabama, U.S.
- Education: Mississippi State University

Coaching career (HC unless noted)
- 2005–2008: Mississippi State (SA)
- 2009–2011: Clemson (GA)
- 2012–2014: Clemson (defensive analyst)
- 2015–2017: Arizona Cardinals (assistant to the HC)
- 2018–2021: Clemson (senior defensive assistant)
- 2022–2024: Clemson (DC/LB)
- 2025–present: Oklahoma (assistant LB/OLB)

Accomplishments and honors

Championships
- National Championship (2018)

Wesley Goodwin (born December 28, 1984) is an American football coach who is currently the assistant linebacker and outside linebacker coach at the University of Oklahoma. Was formerly the defensive coordinator and linebackers coach at Clemson University. He previously served as an assistant coach for the Arizona Cardinals and at Mississippi State University.

== Arizona Cardinals ==
In 2015, Goodwin was hired by the Arizona Cardinals as the assistant to the head coach. Goodwin served under head coach Bruce Arians.

== Clemson (second stint) ==
In 2018, Goodwin returned to Clemson University as a senior defensive assistant.

On December 14, 2021, Goodwin was promoted to defensive coordinator and linebackers coach at Clemson, replacing Brent Venables after his departure to become the head coach at the University of Oklahoma.
