= French National Honor Society =

French National Honor Society may refer to:

- Pi Delta Phi, the French National Honor Society for U.S. college and university undergraduate and graduate students
- Société Honoraire de Français, the French National Honor Society for U.S. high school students
