= 2022 Stanford Cardinal football team =

American college football season

2022 Stanford Cardinal football
- Conference: Pac-12 Conference
- Record: 3–9 (1–8 Pac-12)
- Head coach: David Shaw (12th season)
- Offensive coordinator: Tavita Pritchard (5th season)
- Offensive scheme: Multiple
- Defensive coordinator: Lance Anderson (9th season)
- Base defense: 3–4
- Home stadium: Stanford Stadium

2022 Pac-12 Conference football standings
	Conf.			Overall
Team	W		L	W		L
No. 12 USC y	8	–	1	11	–	3
No. 10 Utah y$	7	–	2	10	–	4
No. 8 Washington	7	–	2	11	–	2
No. 15 Oregon	7	–	2	10	–	3
No. 17 Oregon State	6	–	3	10	–	3
No. 21 UCLA	6	–	3	9	–	4
Washington State	4	–	5	7	–	6
Arizona	3	–	6	5	–	7
California	2	–	7	4	–	8
Arizona State†	2	–	7	3	–	9
Stanford	1	–	8	3	–	9
Colorado	1	–	8	1	–	11
Championship: Utah 47, USC 24
$ – Conference champion; y – Championship game participant; Rankings from AP Poll

The 2022 Stanford Cardinal football team represented Stanford University in the Pac-12 Conference during the 2022 NCAA Division I FBS football season. Led by twelfth-year head coach David Shaw, the Cardinal was 3–9 (1–8 in Pac-12, eleventh) and played home games on campus at Stanford Stadium in Stanford, California.

E. J. Smith, son of all-time leading rusher in National Football League (NFL) history, Emmitt Smith, was the team's top running back.

It was Stanford's second straight season at 3–9; just over an hour after the season finale, a home loss to BYU on November 26, Shaw resigned effective immediately. Two weeks later, he was succeeded by Troy Taylor, the head coach at Sacramento State.

== Schedule ==
Date	Time	Opponent	Site	TV	Result	Attendance
September 3	5:00 p.m.	Colgate*	Stanford Stadium; Stanford, CA	P12N	W 41–10	26,826
September 10	4:30 p.m.	No. 10 USC	Stanford Stadium; Stanford, CA (rivalry)	ABC	L 28–41	43,813
September 24	7:30 p.m.	at No. 18 Washington	Husky Stadium; Seattle, WA	FS1	L 22–40	65,438
October 1	8:00 p.m.	at No. 13 Oregon	Autzen Stadium; Eugene, OR (rivalry)	FS1	L 27–45	52,218
October 8	8:00 p.m.	Oregon State	Stanford Stadium; Stanford, CA	ESPN	L 27–28	32,482
October 15	4:30 p.m.	at Notre Dame*	Notre Dame Stadium; Notre Dame, IN (rivalry)	NBC	W 16–14	77,622
October 22	1:00 p.m.	Arizona State^{†}	Stanford Stadium; Stanford, CA	P12N	W 15–14	25,061
October 29	7:30 p.m.	at No. 12 UCLA	Rose Bowl; Pasadena, CA (rivalry)	ESPN	L 13–38	43,850
November 5	12:30 p.m.	Washington State	Stanford Stadium; Stanford, CA	P12N	L 14–52	26,515
November 12	7:00 p.m.	at No. 13 Utah	Rice-Eccles Stadium; Salt Lake City, UT	ESPN	L 7–42	51,951
November 19	2:30 p.m.	at California	California Memorial Stadium; Berkeley, CA (Big Game)	P12N	L 20–27	51,892
November 26	8:00 p.m.	BYU*	Stanford Stadium; Stanford, CA	FS1	L 26–35	25,094
*Non-conference game; ^{†}Homecoming; Rankings from AP Poll (and CFP Rankings, after November 1) - Released prior to game; All times are in Pacific time

== Roster ==
2022 Stanford Cardinal football team roster
Players
Coaches
Offense

Pos.	#	Name	Class
WR	0	Mudia Reuben	Fr
RB	2	Casey Filkins	Jr
WR	3	Bryce Farrell	Jr
WR	4	Michael Wilson	GS
WR	5	John Humphreys	Jr
WR	6	Elijah Higgins	Sr
RB	8	Brendon Barrow	So
WR	9	Colby Bowman	Sr
QB	10	Beau Nelson	Jr
QB	11	Ari Patu	So
QB	14	Ashton Daniels	Fr
QB	17	Charlie Mirer	Fr
QB	18	Tanner McKee	Jr
WR	19	Silas Starr	Jr
RB	20	Danny McFadden	So
RB	21	Caleb Robinson	Jr
RB	22	E. J. Smith	Jr
FB/LS	23	Jacob Lowe	Fr
FB	24	Jay Symonds	GS
WR	26	Jason Thompson	Fr
WR	30	Elic Ayomanor	Fr
TE	32	Donovan Jones	Fr
RB	33	Arlen Harris	Fr
G	52	Lucas Heyer	Fr
C	55	Drake Metcalf	Jr
G	57	Levi Rogers	Jr
C	60	Drake Nugent	Sr
G	63	Barrett Miller	Sr
G	65	Kenji Swanson	Fr
G	66	Branson Bragg	Sr
OT	67	Fisher Anderson	Fr
G	68	Max Kalny	Jr
G/T	69	Jake Maikkula	Fr
OT	70	Jason Amler	So
OT	71	Connor McLaughlin	Jr
G	73	Jake Hornibrook	Sr
OT	74	James Pogorelc	Jr
OT	75	Walter Rouse	Sr
OT	76	Jack Leyrer	So
C	77	Logan Berzins	Jr
OT	78	Myles Hinton	Jr
C	79	Will Gibson	So
WR	80	David Kasemervisz	So
WR	81	Brycen Tremayne	GS
WR	82	Jayson Raines	So
WR	83	Kale Lucas	So
TE	84	Benjamin Yurosek	Jr
FB	85	Shield Taylor	So
TE	86	Sam Roush	Fr
TE	87	Bradley Archer	Sr
TE	88	C. J. Hawkins	Fr
TE	89	Lukas Ungar	Jr

Defense

Pos.	#	Name	Class
OLB	0	Aeneas DiCosmo	Sr
S	2	Jonathan McGill	Sr
ILB	3	Levani Damuni	Sr
CB	4	Salim Turner-Muhammad	Sr
OLB	5	Wilfredo Aybar	So
CB	6	Nicolas Toomer	Sr
ILB	8	Tristan Sinclair	Sr
DE	9	Aaron Armitage	So
ILB	10	Spencer Jorgensen	Sr
OLB	11	Thunder Keck	GS
CB	13	Ethan Bonner	GS
ILB	14	Jacob Magnum-Farrar	GS
OLB	15	Stephen Herron	Sr
CB	17	Kyu Blu Kelly	Sr
CB	18	Jimmy Wyrick	So
S	19	Caleb Ellis	So
S	20	Jaden Slocum	So
S	21	Kendall Williamson	GS
ILB	22	Jason Kaul	Sr
OLB	23	David Bailey	Fr
S	24	Patrick Fields	Sr
CB	25	Brandon Jones	Jr
S	27	Omari Porter	Jr
CB	28	Joshua Thompson	Fr
CB	29	Terian Williams	Fr
ILB	30	Ese Dubre	So
S	32	Mitch Leigber	So
S	33	Alaka'i Gilman	Jr
CB	34	Evan Jackson	So
ILB	35	Matt Rose	Fr
CB	36	Collin Wright	Fr
S	37	Scotty Edwards	Fr
DT	40	Tobin Phillips	Jr
OLB	44	Ernest Cooper	Fr
ILB	45	Ricky Miezan	GS
ILB	48	Benjamin Hudson	Fr
DT	51	Jaxson Moi	Fr
OLB	52	Duke Reeder	So
DE	55	Matthew Merritt	Jr
DT	72	Austin Uke	So
DE	90	Tevarua Tafiti	Fr
DE	91	Pat Caughey	Fr
OLB	92	Lance Keneley	Jr
DE	93	Kaz Melzer	Fr
DE	94	Anthony Franklin	So
DE	95	Aristotle Taylor	So
DE	96	Jacob Katona	So
DE	97	Zach Rowell	Fr
DE	98	Zach Buckey	So
DT	99	Zephron Lester	Jr

Special teams

Pos.	#	Name	Class
K	13	Emmet Kenney	So
P	15	Connor Weselman	So
P	27	Ryan Sanborn	Sr
LS	42	Bailey Parsons	Jr
K	43	Joshua Karty	Jr
LS	47	Alejandro Chavez	Fr

Head coach

- David Shaw

Coordinators/assistant coaches

- Lance Anderson – Defensive coordinator
- Tavita Pritchard – Offensive coordinator / quarterbacks
- Pete Alamar – Special teams coordinator
- Duane Akina – Defensive backs
- Ron Gould – Running backs
- Terry Heffernan – Offensive line
- Bobby Kennedy – Wide receivers
- Diron Reynolds – Defensive line
- Eric Sanders – Inside linebackers
- Morgan Turner – Tight ends
- Dylan Cruz – Offensive quality control analyst
- Corey Edsall – Offensive quality control analyst
- Tsuyoshi Kawata – Offensive quality control analyst
- Dorian Keller – Offensive quality control analyst
- Ray Clark – Defensive quality control analyst
- Patrick Moynahan – Defensive quality control analyst
- Dorian Maddox – Special teams graduate assistant
- Thomas Merkle – Offensive graduate assistant
- Jonathan McDonald – Defensive graduate assistant
- Jacob Russell – Defensive graduate assistant

Legend

- (C) Team captain
- (S) Suspended
- (I) Ineligible
- Injured
- Redshirt

Roster
Last update: October 1, 2021

== Game summaries ==
=== vs Colgate ===
Colgate Raiders (0–0) vs Stanford Cardinal (0–0) – Game summary

Quarter	1	2	3	4	Total
Raiders	0	7	3	0	10
Cardinal	7	21	0	13	41

at Stanford Stadium • Stanford, CA

- Date: September 3, 2022
- Game time: 5:00 p.m.
- Game weather: Sunny, 79 °F (26 °C)
- Game attendance: 26,826
- Referee: Mark Duddy
- TV announcers (Pac-12 Network): Jordan Kent (play-by-play), Greg Camarillo (analyst)

Game information

First quarter

- (14:42) STAN – E. J. Smith 87-yard run, Joshua Karty kick (Drive: 1 play, 87 yards, 0:15; Stanford 7–0)

Second quarter

- (14:48) COLG – Asauni Allen 0-yard fumble return, Spencer Biscoe kick (Drive: 3 plays, 3 yards, 1:48; Tied 7–7)
- (12:49) STAN – Michael Wilson 26-yard pass from Tanner McKee, Joshua Karty kick (Drive: 5 plays, 75 yards, 1:59; Stanford 14–7)
- (6:31) STAN – E. J. Smith 1-yard run, Joshua Karty kick (Drive: 8 plays, 72 yards, 4:20; Stanford 21–7)
- (1:16) STAN – Michael Wilson 13-yard pass from Tanner McKee, Joshua Karty (Drive: 8 plays, 56 yards, 4:14; Stanford 28–10)

Third quarter

- (5:17) COLG – Spencer Biscoe 25-yard field goal (Drive: 8 plays, 47 yards, 3:38; Stanford 28–10)

Fourth quarter

- (14:15) STAN – Casey Filkins 1-yard run, Joshua Karty kick (Drive: 5 plays, 75 yards, 1:56; Stanford 35–10)
- (3:15) STAN – Mudia Reuben 7-yard pass from Ari Patu (Drive: 9 plays, 48 yards, 4:33; Stanford 41–10)

Statistics	COLG	STAN
First downs	11	20
Total yards	218	497
Rushes/yards	39–159	28–169
Passing yards	59	328
Passing: Comp–Att–Int	10–20–1	24–30–1
Time of possession	32:06	27:54

Team	Category	Player	Statistics
Colgate	Passing	Michael Brescia	9/19, 57 yards, INT
Colgate	Rushing	Max Hurleman	12 carries, 65 yards
Colgate	Receiving	Jake Ryan	1 reception, 21 yards
Stanford	Passing	Tanner McKee	22/27, 308 yards, 2 TD, INT
Stanford	Rushing	E. J. Smith	11 carries, 118 yards, 2 TD
Stanford	Receiving	John Humphreys	4 receptions, 88 yards

=== vs No. 10 USC ===
No. 10 USC Trojans (1–0) vs Stanford Cardinal (1–0) – Game summary

Quarter	1	2	3	4	Total
No. 10 Trojans	21	14	6	0	41
Cardinal	7	7	0	14	28

at Stanford Stadium • Stanford, CA

- Date: September 10, 2022
- Game time: 4:30 p.m.
- Game weather: Sunny, 79 °F (26 °C)
- Game attendance: 43,813
- Referee: Michael Mothershed
- TV announcers (ABC): Rece Davis (play-by-play), Kirk Herbstreit (analyst), Holly Rowe (sideline)

Game information

First quarter

- (12:38) USC – Lake McRee 5-yard pass from Caleb Williams, Denis Lynch kick (Drive: 4 plays, 33 yards, 1:22; USC 7–0)
- (4:03) USC – Jordan Addison 22-yard pass from Caleb Williams, Denis Lynch kick (Drive: 8 plays, 83 yards, 3:23; USC 14–0)
- (0:57) STAN – E. J. Smith 3-yard pass from Tanner McKee, Joshua Karty kick (Drive: 7 plays, 93 yards, 3:06; USC 14–7)
- (0:46) USC – Jordan Addison 75-yard pass from Caleb Williams, Denis Lynch kick (Drive: 1 play, 75 yards, 0:11; USC 21–7)

Second quarter

- (9:02) USC – Mario Williams 15-yard pass from Caleb Williams, Denis Lynch kick (Drive: 7 plays, 98 yards, 3:13; USC 28–7)
- (6:13) STAN – E. J. Smith 5-yard run, Joshua Karty kick (Drive: 8 plays, 67 yards, 2:49; USC 28–14)
- (2:33) USC – Travis Dye 27-yard run, Denis Lynch kick (Drive: 7 plays, 75 yards, 3:40; USC 35–14)

Third quarter

- (13:49) USC – Denis Lynch 45-yard field goal (Drive: 5 plays, 47 yards, 1:11; USC 38–14)
- (0:55) USC – Denis Lynch 42-yard field goal (Drive: 4 plays, 4 yards, 2:14; USC 41–14)

Fourth quarter

- (10:21) STAN – Casey Filkins 2-yard run, Joshua Karty kick (Drive: 13 plays, 75 yards, 5:34; USC 41–21)
- (5:03) STAN – Tanner McKee 2-yard run, Joshua Karty kick (Drive: 7 plays, 70 yards, 2:51; USC 41–28)

Statistics	USC	STAN
First downs	24	33
Total yards	505	441
Rushes/yards	36–164	45–221
Passing yards	341	220
Passing: Comp–Att–Int	20–27–0	20–35–2
Time of possession	30:33	29:27

Team	Category	Player	Statistics
USC	Passing	Caleb Williams	20/27, 341 yards, 4 TD
USC	Rushing	Travis Dye	14 carries, 105 yards, TD
USC	Receiving	Jordan Addison	7 receptions, 172 yards, 2 TD
Stanford	Passing	Tanner McKee	20/35, 220 yards, TD, 2 INT
Stanford	Rushing	E. J. Smith	19 carries, 88 yards, TD
Stanford	Receiving	Elijah Higgins	3 receptions, 50 yards

=== at No. 18 Washington ===
Stanford Cardinal (1–1) at No. 18 Washington Huskies (3–0) – Game summary

Quarter	1	2	3	4	Total
Cardinal	0	7	0	15	22
No. 18 Huskies	7	10	7	13	37

at Husky Stadium • Seattle, WA

- Date: September 24, 2022
- Game time: 7:30 p.m.
- Game weather: Cloudy, 64 °F (18 °C)
- Game attendance: 52,218
- Referee: Steven Strimling
- TV announcers (FS1): Alex Faust (play-by-play), Petros Papadakis (analyst)

Game information

First quarter

- (10:32) WASH – Will Nixon 3-yard run, Peyton Henry kick (Drive: 6 plays, 58 yards, 2:27; Washington 7–0)

Second quarter

- (13:26) WASH – Peyton Henry 35-yard field goal (Drive: 13 plays, 69 yards, 5:03; Washington 10–0)
- (5:53) WASH – Wayne Taulapapa 34-yard run, Peyton Henry kick (Drive: 2 plays, 43 yards, 0:32; Washington 17–0)
- (4:00) STAN – Michael Wilson 23-yard pass from Tanner McKee, Joshua Karty kick (Drive: 7 plays, 75 yards, 1:47; Washington 17–7)

Third quarter

- (10:54) WASH – Peyton Henry 47-yard field goal (Drive: 9 plays, 46 yards, 4:06; Washington 20–7)
- (6:43) WASH – Rome Odunze 30-yard pass from Michael Penix Jr., Peyton Henry kick (Drive: 5 plays, 69 yards, 2:26; Washington 27–7)
- (2:49) WASH – Peyton Henry 32-yard field goal (Drive: 8 plays, 29 yards, 2:38; Washington 30–7)

Fourth quarter

- (13:58) STAN – John Humphreys 17-yard pass from Tanner McKee, Tanner McKee two-point pass to Brycen Tremayne (Drive: 10 plays, 75 yards, 3:51; Washington 30–15)
- (11:21) WASH – Peyton Henry 26-yard field goal (Drive: 5 plays, 66 yards, 2:37; Washington 33–15)
- (7:41) WASH – Giles Jackson 21-yard pass from Michael Penix Jr., Peyton Henry kick (Drive: 6 plays, 30 yards, 3:04; Washington 40–15)
- (1:45) STAN – Michael Wilson 78-yard pass from Tanner McKee, Joshua Karty kick (Drive: 4 plays, 92 yards, 1:18; Washington 40–22)

Statistics	STAN	WASH
First downs	18	23
Total yards	372	478
Rushes/yards	36–86	32–169
Passing yards	286	309
Passing: Comp–Att–Int	17–26–1	22–37–0
Time of possession	26:30	33:30

Team	Category	Player	Statistics
Stanford	Passing	Tanner McKee	17/26, 286 yards, 3 TD, INT
Stanford	Rushing	Casey Filkins	20 carries, 100 yards
Stanford	Receiving	Michael Wilson	6 receptions, 176 yards, 2 TD
Washington	Passing	Michael Penix Jr.	22/37, 309 yards, 2 TD
Washington	Rushing	Wayne Taulapapa	13 carries, 120 yards, TD
Washington	Receiving	Rome Odunze	8 receptions, 161 yards, TD

=== at No. 13 Oregon ===
Stanford Cardinal (1–2) at No. 13 Oregon Ducks (3–1) – Game summary

Quarter	1	2	3	4	Total
Cardinal	0	3	14	10	27
No. 13 Ducks	10	21	7	7	45

at Autzen Stadium • Eugene, OR

- Date: October 1, 2022
- Game time: 8:00 p.m.
- Game weather: Sunny, 52 °F (11 °C)
- Game attendance: 52,218
- Referee: Francisco Villar
- TV announcers (ABC): Alex Faust (play-by-play), Petros Papadakis (analyst)

Game information

First quarter

- (10:00) ORE – Camden Lewis 38-yard field goal (Drive: 11 plays, 46 yards, 3:51; Oregon 3–0)
- (0:00) ORE – Chase Cota 49-yard pass from Bo Nix, Camden Lewis kick (Drive: 2 plays, 59 yards, 0:16; Oregon 10–0)

Second quarter

- (7:37) STAN – Joshua Karty 23-yard field goal (Drive: 12 plays, 76 yards, 4:42; Oregon 10–3)
- (2:22) ORE – Troy Franklin 10-yard pass from Bo Nix, Camden Lewis kick (Drive: 8 plays, 75 yards, 3:15; Oregon 17–3)
- (3:59) ORE – Bo Nix 4-yard run, Camden Lewis kick (Drive: 1 play, 4 yards, 0:08; Oregon 24–3)
- (0:01) ORE – Jordan James 1-yard run, Camden Lewis kick (Drive: 10 plays, 68 yards, 2:34; Oregon 31–3)

Third quarter

- (5:01) STAN – Casey Filkins 42-yard pass from Tanner McKee, Joshua Karty kick (Drive: 7 plays, 75 yards, 2:46; Oregon 31–10)
- (4:46) ORE – Bo Nix 80-yard run, Camden Lewis kick (Drive: 1 play, 80 yards, 0:14; Oregon 38–10)
- (2:12) STAN – Elijah Higgins 28-yard pass from Tanner McKee, Joshua Karty (Drive: 6 plays, 64 yards, 2:26; Oregon 38–17)

Fourth quarter

- (14:31) ORE – Sean Dollars 2-yard run, Camden Lewis kick (Drive: 7 plays, 75 yards, 2:41; Oregon 45–17)
- (4:22) STAN – Joshua Karty 53-yard field goal (Drive: 8 plays, 50 yards, 3:17; Oregon 45–20)
- (1:03) STAN – Mudia Reuben 18-yard pass from Ari Patu, Joshua Karty kick (Drive: 5 plays, 50 yards, 1:53; Oregon 45–27)

Statistics	STAN	ORE
First downs	22	23
Total yards	332	515
Rushes/yards	34–127	37–351
Passing yards	205	164
Passing: Comp–Att–Int	22–38–0	17–34–1
Time of possession	32:36	27:24

Team	Category	Player	Statistics
Stanford	Passing	Tanner McKee	19/33, 166 yards, 2 TD
Stanford	Rushing	Casey Filkins	19 carries, 80 yards
Stanford	Receiving	Casey Filkins	3 receptions, 59 yards, TD
Oregon	Passing	Bo Nix	16/29, 161 yards, 2 TD
Oregon	Rushing	Bo Nix	6 carries, 141 yards, 2 TD
Oregon	Receiving	Chase Cota	2 receptions, 56 yards, TD

=== vs Oregon State ===
Oregon State Beavers (3–2) vs Stanford Cardinal (1–3) – Game summary

Quarter	1	2	3	4	Total
Beavers	0	7	3	18	28
Cardinal	7	10	7	3	27

at Stanford Stadium • Stanford, CA

- Date: October 8, 2022
- Game time: 8:00 p.m.
- Game weather: Clear, 63 °F (17 °C)
- Game attendance: 50,424
- Referee: Mark Duddy
- TV announcers (ESPN): Mark Jones (play-by-play), Robert Griffin III (analyst), Quint Kessenich (sideline)

Game information

First quarter

- (3:37) STAN – Casey Filkins 1-yard run, Joshua Karty kick (Drive: 12 plays, 78 yards, 5:30; Stanford 7–0)

Second quarter

- (10:52) ORST – Jack Colletto 1-yard run, Atticus Sappington kick (Drive: 16 plays, 99 yards, 7:45; Tied 7–7)
- (8:44) STAN – Joshua Karty 47-yard field goal (Drive: 5 plays, 36 yards, 2:08; Stanford 10–7)
- (0:58) STAN – Brycen Tremayne 21-yard pass from Tanner McKee, Joshua Karty kick (Drive: 7 plays, 61 yards, 1:38; Stanford 17–7)

Third quarter

- (7:03) ORST – Atticus Sappington 40-yard field goal (Drive: 11 plays, 53 yards, 6:37; Stanford 17–10)
- (3:41) STAN – Brycen Tremayne 37-yard pass from Tanner McKee, Joshua Karty kick (Drive: 4 plays, 65 yards, 0:52; Stanford 24–10)

Fourth quarter

- (14:50) ORST – Silas Bolden 21-yard pass from Ben Gulbranson (Drive: 8 plays, 75 yards, 3:51; Stanford 24–16)
- (5:45) ORST – Damien Martinez 43-yard run (Drive: 3 plays, 66 yards, 1:14; Stanford 24–22)
- (0:58) STAN – Joshua Karty 46-yard field goal (Drive: 11 plays, 49 yards, 4:47; Stanford 27–22)
- (0:13) ORST – Tre'Shaun Harrison 56-yard pass from Ben Gulbranson (Drive: 3 plays, 76 yards, 0:45; Oregon State 28–27)

Statistics	ORST	STAN
First downs	23	19
Total yards	442	359
Rushes/yards	40–192	27–90
Passing yards	250	269
Passing: Comp–Att–Int	20–29–0	20–34–1
Time of possession	33:42	26:18

Team	Category	Player	Statistics
Oregon State	Passing	Ben Gulbranson	20/29, 250 yards, 2 TD
Oregon State	Rushing	Damien Martinez	3 carries, 83 yards, TD
Oregon State	Receiving	Tre'Shaun Harrison	7 receptions, 104 yards, TD
Stanford	Passing	Tanner McKee	20/33, 269 yards, 2 TD, INT
Stanford	Rushing	Casey Filkins	21 carries, 62 yards, TD
Stanford	Receiving	Brycen Tremayne	6 receptions, 82 yards, 2 TD

=== at Notre Dame ===
Stanford Cardinal (1–4) at Notre Dame Fighting Irish (3–2) – Game summary

Quarter	1	2	3	4	Total
Cardinal	7	3	3	3	16
Fighting Irish	0	0	7	7	14

at Notre Dame Stadium • South Bend, IN

- Date: October 15, 2022
- Game time: 7:30 p.m. EST
- Game weather: Sunny, 50 °F (10 °C)
- Game attendance: 77,622
- Referee: Mike McCabe
- TV announcers (NBC): Jac Collinsworth (play–by–play), Jason Garrett (analyst), Zora Stephenson (sideline)

Game information

First quarter

- (10:05) STAN – Casey Filkins 2-yard run, Joshua Karty kick (Drive: 8 plays, 66 yards, 3:28; Stanford 7–0)

Second quarter

- (0:00) STAN – Joshua Karty 45-yard field goal (Drive: 6 plays, 18 yards, 0:42; Stanford 10–0)

Third quarter

- (8:44) STAN – Joshua Karty 43-yard field goal (Drive: 9 plays, 48 yards, 3:00; Stanford 13–0)
- (6:22) ND – Audric Estimé 10-yard run, Blake Grupe kick (Drive: 6 plays, 75 yards, 2:22; Stanford 13–7)

Fourth quarter

- (14:53) ND – Tobias Merriweather 41-yard pass from Drew Pyne, Blake Grupe kick (Drive: 6 plays, 60 yards, 2:40; Notre Dame 14–13)
- (10:20) STAN – Joshua Karty 43-yard field goal (Drive: 10 plays, 51 yards, 4:33; Stanford 16–14)

Statistics	STAN	ND
First downs	21	16
Total yards	385	301
Rushes/yards	42–97	34–150
Passing yards	288	151
Passing: Comp–Att–Int	26–39–0	13–27–0
Time of possession	36:07	23:53

Team	Category	Player	Statistics
Stanford	Passing	Tanner McKee	26/38, 288 yards
Stanford	Rushing	Casey Filkins	32 carries, 91 yards, TD
Stanford	Receiving	Elijah Higgins	5 receptions, 81 yards
Notre Dame	Passing	Drew Pyne	13/27, 151 yards, TD
Notre Dame	Rushing	Audric Estimé	8 carries, 57 yards, TD
Notre Dame	Receiving	Michael Mayer	5 receptions, 60 yards

=== vs Arizona State ===
Arizona State Sun Devils (2–4) vs Stanford Cardinal (2–4) – Game summary

Quarter	1	2	3	4	Total
Sun Devils	7	7	0	0	14
Cardinal	6	0	3	6	15

at Stanford Stadium • Stanford, CA

- Date: October 22, 2022
- Game time: 1:00 p.m.
- Game weather: Cloudy, 67 °F (19 °C)
- Game attendance: 25,061
- Referee: Matthew Richard
- TV announcers (Pac-12 Network): J. B. Long (play-by-play), Yogi Roth (analyst)

Game information

First quarter

- (10:00) STAN – Joshua Karty 44-yard field goal (Drive: 9 plays, 44 yards, 3:42; Stanford 3–0)
- (6:47) ASU – Xazavian Valladay 15-yard run, Carter Brown kick (Drive: 6 plays, 75 yards, 3:13; Arizona State 7–3)
- (1:55) STAN – Joshua Karty 36-yard field goal (Drive: 11 plays, 57 yards, 4:52; Arizona State 7–6)

Second Quarter

- (14:01) ASU – Elijhah Badger 39-yard pass from Emory Jones, Carter Brown kick (Drive: 7 plays, 75 yards, 2:54; Arizona State 14–6)

Third quarter

- (6:08) STAN – Joshua Karty 44-yard field goal (Drive: 8 plays, 21 yards, 2:50; Arizona State 14–9)

Fourth quarter

- (14:52) STAN – Joshua Karty 36-yard field goal (Drive: 9 plays, 67 yards, 2:27; Arizona State 14–12)
- (6:28) STAN – Joshua Karty 47-yard field goal (Drive: 15 plays, 70 yards, 5:05; Stanford 15–14)

Statistics	ASU	STAN
First downs	19	28
Total yards	355	398
Rushes/yards	34–128	25–78
Passing yards	227	320
Passing: Comp–Att–Int	14–26–1	33–58–1
Time of possession	28:22	31:38

Team	Category	Player	Statistics
Arizona State	Passing	Emory Jones	14/25, 227 yards, TD, INT
Arizona State	Rushing	Xazavian Valladay	18 carries, 76 yards, TD
Arizona State	Receiving	Elijhah Badger	6 receptions, 118 yards, TD
Stanford	Passing	Tanner McKee	33/57, 320 yards, INT
Stanford	Rushing	Casey Filkins	8 carries, 48 yards
Stanford	Receiving	John Humphreys	8 receptions, 90 yards

=== at No. 12 UCLA ===
Stanford Cardinal (3–4) at No. 12 UCLA Bruins (6–1) – Game summary

Quarter	1	2	3	4	Total
Cardinal	3	3	0	7	13
No. 12 Bruins	14	10	7	7	38

at Rose Bowl • Pasadena, CA

- Date: October 29, 2022
- Game time: 7:30 p.m.
- Game weather: Clear, 66 °F (19 °C)
- Game attendance: 43,850
- Referee: Chris Coyle
- TV announcers (ESPN): Mike Monaco (play-by-play), Rod Gilmore (analyst), Lauren Sisler (sideline), Todd McShay (sideline)

Game information

First quarter

- (10:35) STAN – Joshua Karty 22-yard field goal (Drive: 11 plays, 61 yards, 4:25; Stanford 3–0)
- (6:05) UCLA – Dorian Thompson-Robinson 3-yard run, Nicholas Barr-Mira kick (Drive: 12 plays, 75 yards, 4:30; UCLA 7–3)
- (5:45) UCLA – Zach Charbonnet 23-yard run, Nicholas Barr-Mira kick (Drive: 1 plays, 23 yards, 0:06; UCLA 14–3)

Second quarter

- (12:57) UCLA – Nicholas Barr-Mira 31-yard field goal (Drive: 13 plays, 73 yards, 4:16; UCLA 17–3)
- (4:26) UCLA – Zach Charbonnet 1-yard run, Nicholas Barr-Mira kick (Drive: 11 plays, 80 yards, 5:34; UCLA 24–3)
- (1:23) STAN – Joshua Karty 49-yard field goal (Drive: 4 plays, 1 yards, 1:32; UCLA 24–6)

Third quarter

- (0:03) UCLA – Zach Charbonnet 37-yard run, Nicholas Barr-Mira kick (Drive: 8 plays, 58 yards, 3:13; UCLA 31–6)

Fourth quarter

- (10:29) UCLA – Kazmeir Allen 72-yard run, Nicholas Barr-Mira kick (Drive: 6 plays, 99 yards, 2:40; UCLA 38–6)
- (4:11) STAN – Benjamin Yurosek 2-yard pass from Tanner McKee, Joshua Karty kick (Drive: 14 plays, 75 yards, 6:18; UCLA 38–13)

Statistics	STAN	UCLA
First downs	18	26
Total yards	270	523
Rushes/yards	34–145	45–324
Passing yards	125	199
Passing: Comp–Att–Int	15–31–1	18–29–0
Time of possession	31:27	28:33

Team	Category	Player	Statistics
Stanford	Passing	Tanner McKee	13/29, 115 yards, TD, int
Stanford	Rushing	Ashton Daniels	5 carries, 51 yards
Stanford	Receiving	Benjamin Yurosek	5 receptions, 32 yards, TD
UCLA	Passing	Dorian Thompson-Robinson	18/29, 299 yards
UCLA	Rushing	Zach Charbonnet	21 carries, 198 yards, 3 TD
UCLA	Receiving	Zach Charbonnet	5 receptions, 61 yards

=== vs Washington State ===
Washington State Cougars (4–4) vs Stanford Cardinal (3–5) – Game summary

Quarter	1	2	3	4	Total
Cougars	21	21	3	7	52
Cardinal	7	0	7	0	14

at Stanford Stadium • Stanford, CA

- Date: November 5, 2022
- Game time: 12:30 p.m.
- Game weather: Cloudy, 59 °F (15 °C)
- Game attendance: 26,515
- Referee: Mark Duddy
- TV announcers (Pac-12 Network): Roxy Bernstein (play-by-play), Michael Bumpus (analyst)

Game information

First quarter

- (12:48) WSU – Leyton Smithson 3-yard run, Dean Janikowski kick (Drive: 6 plays, 80 yards, 2:07; Washington State 7–0)
- (9:29) WSU – Anderson Grover 7-yard pass from Cameron Ward, Dean Janikowski kick (Drive: 8 plays, 55 yards, 2:24; Washington State 14–0)
- (6:27) WSU – Cameron Ward 15-yard run, Dean Janikowski kick (Drive: 6 plays, 75 yards, 1:28; Washington State 21–0)
- (3:42) STAN – Ashton Daniels 1-yard run, Joshua Karty kick (Drive: 7 plays, 68 yards, 2:38; Washington State 21–7)

Second quarter

- (8:06) WSU – Jaden Hicks 17-yard fumble return, Dean Janikowski kick (Drive: 2 plays, 12 yards, 0:31; Washington State 28–7)
- (2:03) WSU – Donovan Ollie 9-yard pass from Cameron Ward, Dean Janikowski kick (Drive: 11 plays, 62 yards, 4:11; Washington State 35–7)
- (0:59) WSU – Nakia Watson 41-yard run, Dean Janikowski kick (Drive: 1 play, 41 yards, 0:08; Washington State 42–7)

Third quarter

- (11:53) STAN – Ashton Daniels 2-yard run, Joshua Karty kick (Drive: 7 plays, 74 yards, 3:02; Washington State 42–14)
- (5:43) WSU – Dean Janikowski 22-yard field goal (Drive: 5 plays, 31 yards, 2:13; Washington State 45–14)

Fourth quarter

- (11:17) WSU – Orion Peters 27-yard pass from John Mateer, Dean Janikowski kick (Drive: 4 plays, 54 yards, 2:13; Washington State 52–14)

Statistics	WSU	STAN
First downs	25	19
Total yards	514	337
Rushes/yards	38–306	28–71
Passing yards	208	266
Passing: Comp–Att–Int	18–34–0	25–42–0
Time of possession	30:11	29:49

Team	Category	Player	Statistics
Washington State	Passing	Cam Ward	16/32, 176 yards, 2 TD
Washington State	Rushing	Nakia Watson	16 carries, 166 yards, TD
Washington State	Receiving	Orion Peters	3 receptions, 50 yards, TD
Stanford	Passing	Tanner McKee	23/40, 236 yards
Stanford	Rushing	Mitch Leigber	11 carries, 23 yards
Stanford	Receiving	Benjamin Yurosek	8 receptions, 90 yards

=== at No. 13 Utah ===
Stanford Cardinal (3–6) vs No. 13 Utah Utes (7–2) – Game summary

Quarter	1	2	3	4	Total
Cardinal	7	0	0	0	7
No. 13 Utes	0	14	21	7	42

at Rice-Eccles Stadium • Salt Lake City, UT

- Date: November 12, 2022
- Game time: 8:00 p.m.
- Game weather: Cloudy, 31 °F (−1 °C)
- Game attendance: 51,919
- Referee: Michael Mothershed
- TV announcers (ESPN): Dave Pasch (play-by-play), Dusty Dvoracek (analyst), Tom Luginbill (sideline)

Game information

First quarter

- (3:40) STAN – Tanner McKee 1-yard run, Joshua Karty kick (Drive: 7 plays, 67 yards, 3:05; Stanford 7–0)

Second quarter

- (12:49) UTAH – Devaughn Vele 9-yard pass from Cameron Rising, Jadon Redding kick (Drive: 12 plays, 75 yards, 5:51; Tied 7–7)
- (6:44) UTAH – Tavion Thomas 4-yard run, Jadon Redding kick (Drive: 9 plays, 69 yards, 4:23; Utah 14–7)

Third quarter

- (8:49) UTAH – Thomas Yassmin 14-yard pass from Cameron Rising, Jadon Redding kick (Drive: 8 plays, 85 yards, 3:51; Utah 21–7)
- (5:14) UTAH – Micah Bernard 19-yard pass from Cameron Rising, Jadon Redding kick (Drive: 6 plays, 56 yards, 2:39; Utah 28–7)
- (1:37) UTAH – Logan Kendall 16-yard pass from Nate Johnson, Jadon Redding kick (Drive: 4 plays, 72 yards, 2:02; Utah 35–7)

Fourth quarter

- (8:32) UTAH – Tavion Thomas 36-yard run, Jadon Redding kick (Drive: 7 plays, 88 yards, 4:53; Utah 42–7)

Statistics	STAN	UTAH
First downs	9	29
Total yards	177	514
Rushes/yards	26–22	36–279
Passing yards	155	235
Passing: Comp–Att–Int	12–25–0	21–34–1
Time of possession	25:29	34:31

Team	Category	Player	Statistics
Stanford	Passing	Tanner McKee	11/23, 155 yards
Stanford	Rushing	Mitch Leigber	12 carries, 40 yards
Stanford	Receiving	Elijah Higgins	7 receptions, 105 yards
Utah	Passing	Cameron Rising	20/33, 219 yards, 3 TD, int
Utah	Rushing	Tavion Thomas	22 carries, 180 yards, 2 TD
Utah	Receiving	Devaughn Vele	6 receptions, 61 yards, TD

=== at California ===
Stanford Cardinal (3–7) at California Golden Bears (3–7) – Game summary

Quarter	1	2	3	4	Total
Cardinal	10	0	7	3	20
Golden Bears	6	0	0	21	27

at California Memorial Stadium • Berkeley, CA

- Date: November 19, 2022
- Game time: 2:30 p.m.
- Game weather: Sunny, 64 °F (18 °C)
- Game attendance: 51,892
- Referee: Mike McCabe
- TV announcers (Pac-12 Network): Roxy Bernstein (play-by-play), Lincoln Kennedy (analyst)

Game information

First quarter

- (12:08) STAN – Mitch Leigber 1-yard run, Joshua Karty kick (Drive: 6 plays, 75 yards, 2:52; Stanford 7–0)
- (10:00) CAL – Dario Longhetto 54-yard field goal (Drive: 7 plays, 39 yards, 2:08; Stanford 7–3)
- (3:47) STAN – Joshua Karty 42-yard field goal (Drive: 11 plays, 51 yards, 6:13; Stanford 10–3)
- (0:33) CAL – Dario Longhetto 38-yard field goal (Drive: 8 plays, 55 yards, 3:14; Stanford 10–6)

Second quarter

None

Third quarter

- (8:31) STAN – Elijah Higgins 9-yard pass from Tanner McKee, Joshua Karty kick (Drive: 11 plays, 71 yards, 5:29; Stanford 17–6)

Fourth quarter

- (11:18) CAL – Monroe Young 1-yard pass from Jack Plummer (Drive: 7 plays, 47 yards, 2:47; Stanford 17–12)
- (9:54) CAL – Jackson Sirmon 37-yard fumble return, Jack Plummer two-point pass to Jaydn Ott (Drive: 3 plays, 12 yards, 1:19; California 20–17)
- (0:58) CAL – Jaydn Ott 1-yard run, Dario Longhetto kick (Drive: 3 plays, 9 yards, 1:18; California 27–17)
- (0:00) STAN – Joshua Karty 61-yard field goal (Drive: 9 plays, 37 yards, 0:54; California 27–20)

Statistics	STAN	CAL
First downs	22	19
Total yards	400	393
Rushes/yards	32–129	22–113
Passing yards	271	280
Passing: Comp–Att–Int	29–48–1	23–43–2
Time of possession	33:54	26:06

Team	Category	Player	Statistics
Stanford	Passing	Tanner McKee	29/45, 271 yards, TD, INT
Stanford	Rushing	Mitch Leigber	22 carries, 83 yards, TD
Stanford	Receiving	Elijah Higgins	8 receptions, 69 yards, TD
California	Passing	Jack Plummer	23/43, 280 yards, TD, 2 int
California	Rushing	Jaydn Ott	18 carries, 97 yards, TD
California	Receiving	Jeremiah Hunter	5 receptions, 103 yards

=== vs BYU ===
BYU Cougars (6–5) vs Stanford Cardinal (3–8) – Game summary

Quarter	1	2	3	4	Total
Cougars	14	14	0	7	35
Cardinal	3	9	0	14	26

at Stanford Stadium • Stanford, CA

- Date: November 26, 2022
- Game time: 8:00 p.m.
- Game weather: Clear, 54 °F (12 °C)
- Game attendance: 25,094
- Referee: Michael Vandervelde
- TV announcers (FS1): Alex Faust (play-by-play), Petros Papadakis (analyst)

Game information

First quarter

- (11:48) BYU – Jaren Hall 19-yard run, Jake Oldroyd kick (Drive: 7 plays, 75 yards, 3:12; BYU 7–0)
- (8:26) STAN – Joshua Karty 34-yard field goal (Drive: 10 plays, 49 yards, 3:19; BYU 7–3)
- (5:29) BYU – Hinckley Ropati 43-yard run, Jake Oldroyd kick (Drive: 7 plays, 75 yards, 2:57; BYU 14–3)

Second quarter

- (13:43) BYU – Isaac Rex 43-yard pass from Jaren Hall, Jake Oldroyd kick (Drive: 5 plays, 76 yards, 2:46; BYU 21–3)
- (7:41) STAN – Mitch Leigber 1-yard run (Drive: 11 plays, 75 yards, 5:57; BYU 21–9)
- (1:50) BYU – Isaac Rex 1-yard pass from Jaren Hall, Jake Oldroyd kick (Drive: 11 plays, 73 yards, 5:37; BYU 28–9)
- (0:00) STAN – Joshua Karty 54-yard field goal (Drive: 11 plays, 38 yards, 1:45; BYU 28–12)

Third quarter

None

Fourth quarter

- (12:48) BYU – Puka Nacua 25-yard run, Jake Oldroyd kick (Drive: 10 plays, 87 yards, 5:28; BYU 35–12)
- (9:18) STAN – Ashton Daniels 1-yard run, Tanner McKee two-point pass to Benjamin Yurosek (Drive: 8 plays, 75 yards, 3:30; BYU 35–20)
- (4:39) STAN – Brycen Tremayne 7-yard pass from Tanner McKee (Drive: 7 plays, 75 yards, 2:59; BYU 35–26)

Statistics	BYU	STAN
First downs	27	20
Total yards	451	371
Rushes/yards	50–358	19–53
Passing yards	93	318
Passing: Comp–Att–Int	7–12–0	32–42–0
Time of possession	32:27	27:33

Team	Category	Player	Statistics
BYU	Passing	Jaren Hall	7/11, 93 yards, 2 TD
BYU	Rushing	Christopher Brooks	23 carries, 164 yards
BYU	Receiving	Isaac Rex	2 receptions, 44 yards, 2 TD
Stanford	Passing	Tanner McKee	31/40, 313 yards, TD
Stanford	Rushing	Mitch Leigber	12 carries, 40 yards, TD
Stanford	Receiving	Brycen Tremayne	11 receptions, 130 yards, TD

== Players drafted into the NFL ==
Stanford had five players selected in the 2023 NFL draft.

Round	Pick	Player	Position	NFL team
3	94	Michael Wilson	WR	Arizona Cardinals
5	157	Kyu Blu Kelly	CB	Baltimore Ravens
6	188	Tanner McKee	QB	Philadelphia Eagles
6	197	Elijah Higgins	WR	Miami Dolphins
7	258	Kendall Williamson	CB	Chicago Bears
