= Brycen Tremayne =

American football player (born 1999)

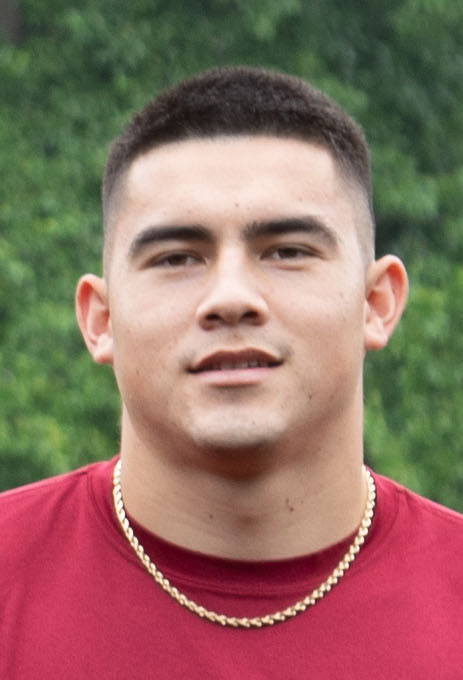
- Tremayne with the Washington Commanders in 2023

No. 87 – Carolina Panthers
- Position: Wide receiver
- Roster status: Active

Personal information
- Born: November 18, 1999 (age 26); Los Angeles, California, U.S.
- Listed height: 6 ft 4 in (1.93 m)
- Listed weight: 212 lb (96 kg)

Career information
- High school: Venice (Los Angeles)
- College: Stanford (2018–2022)
- NFL draft: 2023: undrafted

Career history
- Washington Commanders (2023–2024); Carolina Panthers (2025–present)

Career NFL statistics as of 2025
- Receptions: 15
- Receiving yards: 158
- Stats at Pro Football Reference

Brycen Henry Tremayne (born November 18, 1999) is an American professional football wide receiver for the Carolina Panthers of the National Football League (NFL). He played college football for the Stanford Cardinal and signed with the Washington Commanders as an undrafted free agent in 2023.

== Early life ==
Tremayne was born on November 18, 1999, in Los Angeles, California. He attended Windward School before transferring to Venice High School as a senior. He has Chinese and Japanese ancestry on his mother's side. Tremayne was admitted to Stanford University and walked on to play college football as a wide receiver with the Stanford Cardinal between 2018 and 2022, finishing with 74 career catches for 1,017 yards and 11 touchdowns.

== Professional career ==
Pre-draft measurables
| Height | Weight | Arm length | Hand span | Wingspan | 40-yard dash | 10-yard split | 20-yard split | 20-yard shuttle | Three-cone drill | Vertical jump | Broad jump | Bench press |
|---|---|---|---|---|---|---|---|---|---|---|---|---|
| 6 ft 4 1/8 in (1.93 m) | 204 lb (93 kg) | 33 1/2 in (0.85 m) | 9 5/8 in (0.24 m) | 6 ft 6 7/8 in (2.00 m) | 4.63 s | 1.59 s | 2.68 s | 4.26 s | 6.90 s | 32.0 in (0.81 m) | 10 ft 2 in (3.10 m) | 21 reps |
All values from Pro Day

=== Washington Commanders ===
Tremayne signed with the Washington Commanders as an undrafted free agent on April 30, 2023. He spent the entire 2023 season on the practice squad. Tremayne was waived by the team on August 27, 2024, and re-joined their practice squad the following day.

=== Carolina Panthers ===
Tremayne signed a futures contract with the Carolina Panthers on February 4, 2025.

== Career statistics ==
=== NFL ===
==== Regular season ====
| Year | Team | Games | | Receiving | | | | | Fumbles | |
| Year | Team | GP | GS | Rec | Yds | Avg | Lng | TD | Fum | Lost |
|---|---|---|---|---|---|---|---|---|---|---|
| 2024 | WAS | 2 | 0 | 1 | -2 | -2.0 | -2.0 | 0 | 0 | 0 |
| 2025 | CAR | 16 | 1 | 14 | 160 | 11.4 | 26 | 0 | 1 | 0 |
| Career | | 18 | 1 | 15 | 158 | 10.5 | 26 | 0 | 1 | 0 |

==== Postseason ====
| Year | Team | Games | | Receiving | | | | | Fumbles | |
| Year | Team | GP | GS | Rec | Yds | Avg | Lng | TD | Fum | Lost |
|---|---|---|---|---|---|---|---|---|---|---|
| 2025 | CAR | 1 | 0 | 0 | 0 | 0.0 | 0 | 0 | 0 | 0 |
| Career | | 1 | 0 | 0 | 0 | 0.0 | 0 | 0 | 0 | 0 |
