= 2023 NFL draft =

88th annual meeting of NFL franchises to select newly eligible players

General information
- Date: April 27–29, 2023
- Location: Union Station; Kansas City, Missouri, U.S.
- Networks: ESPN, ESPN2, ABC, NFL Network, ESPN Deportes, ESPN Radio

Overview
- 259 total selections in 7 rounds
- League: National Football League
- First selection: Bryce Young, QB, Carolina Panthers
- Mr. Irrelevant: Desjuan Johnson, DE, Los Angeles Rams
- Most selections (14): Los Angeles Rams
- Fewest selections (4): Miami Dolphins

The 2023 NFL draft was the 88th annual meeting of National Football League (NFL) franchises to select newly eligible players for the 2023 season. The draft was held outside of Union Station in Kansas City, Missouri, from April 27–29, 2023.

The Chicago Bears originally owned the first pick for the first time since 1947 before trading it prior to the draft to the Carolina Panthers for multiple draft picks and wide receiver D. J. Moore. The Panthers selected Alabama quarterback Bryce Young first overall and the Los Angeles Rams selected Desjuan Johnson with the final pick.

== Host city and events ==
Kansas City was chosen as the host city on May 22, 2019. Prior to the start of the draft, the NFL paid tribute to the three victims of the 2022 University of Virginia shooting, who were named honorary draft picks for their favorite teams: the Jacksonville Jaguars, Baltimore Ravens and Miami Dolphins, respectively. The NFL Draft House Band, Lost Wax Band, was selected to entertain the NFL Draft crowd for all three nights.

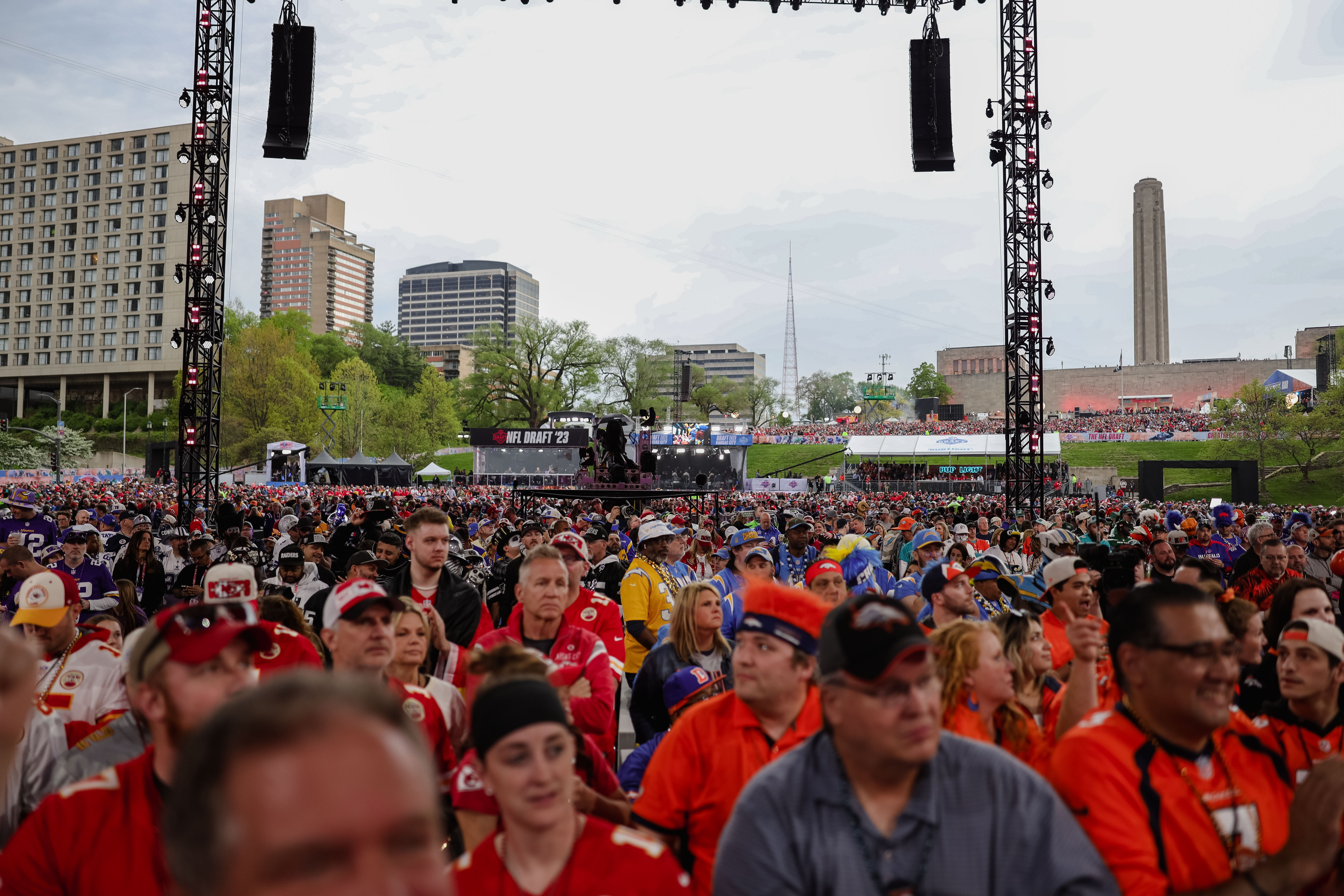
Crowd during the draft

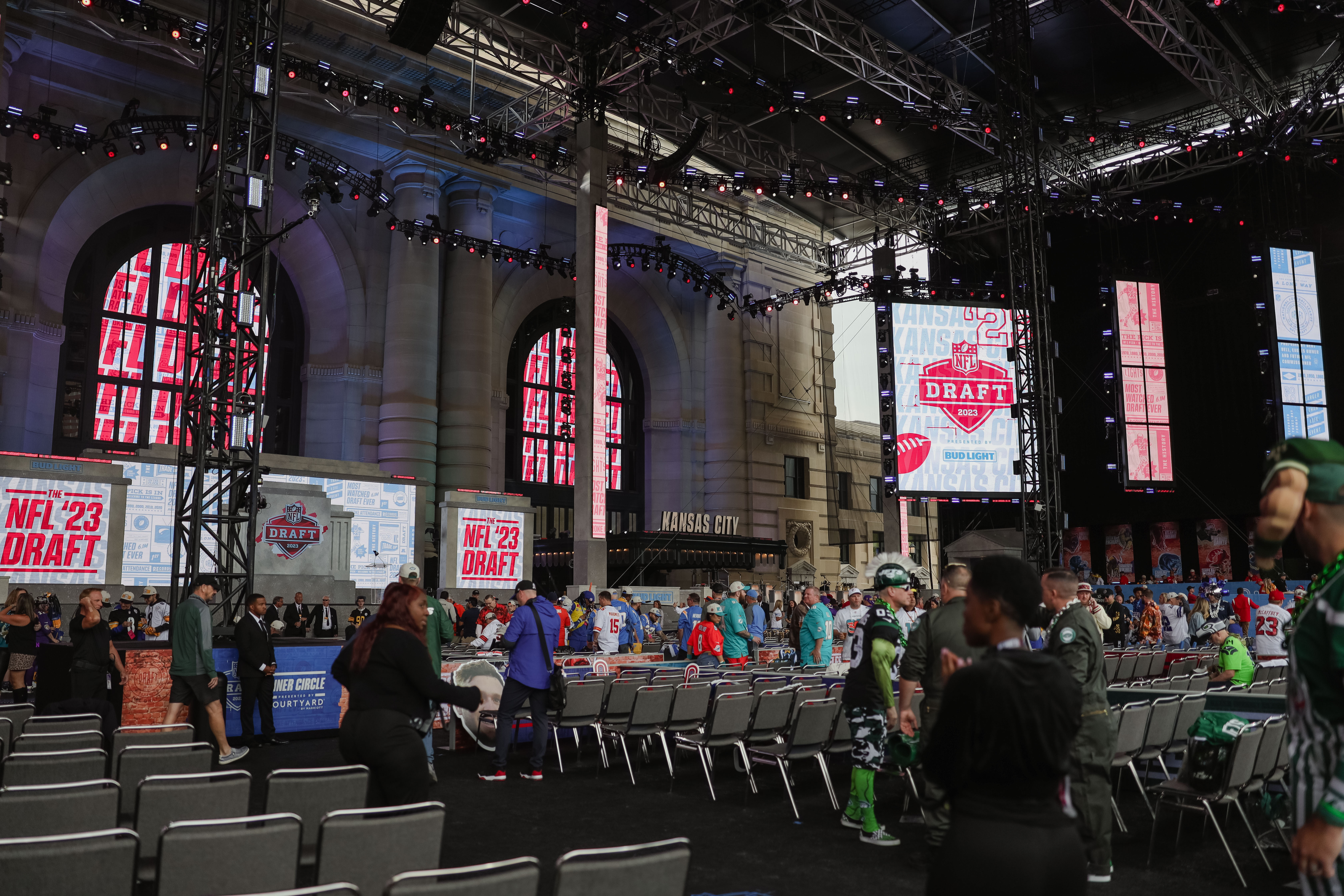
Draft stage area

== Player selections ==
The following is the breakdown of the 259 players selected by position:

- 36 cornerbacks
- 33 wide receivers
- 30 linebackers
- 22 defensive ends
- 21 defensive tackles
- 20 safeties
- 19 offensive tackles
- 18 running backs
- 15 guards
- 15 tight ends
- 14 quarterbacks
- 9 centers
- 3 kickers
- 3 punters
- 1 fullback

*	compensatory selection
^	supplemental compensatory selection
×	Resolution JC-2A selection
†	Pro Bowler (Note: Players are identified as Pro Bowlers if they were selected for the Pro Bowl at any time in their career.)

Positions key
Offense	Defense	Special teams
QB — Quarterback; RB — Running back; FB — Fullback; WR — Wide receiver; TE — Tight end; OL — Offensive lineman; T — Tackle; G — Guard; C — Center	DL — Defensive lineman; DT — Defensive tackle (Note: Includes nose tackle (NT)); DE — Defensive end; EDGE — Edge rusher; LB — Linebacker (Note: Includes middle linebacker (MLB/MIKE), weakside linebacker (WILL), strongside linebacker (SAM), off-ball linebacker, and outside linebacker (OLB)); DB — Defensive back; CB — Cornerback; S — Safety (Note: Includes free safety (FS) and strong safety (SS))	K — Kicker (Note: Also known as a placekicker (PK)); P — Punter; LS — Long snapper; RS — Return specialist (Note: Includes kickoff and punt returners)

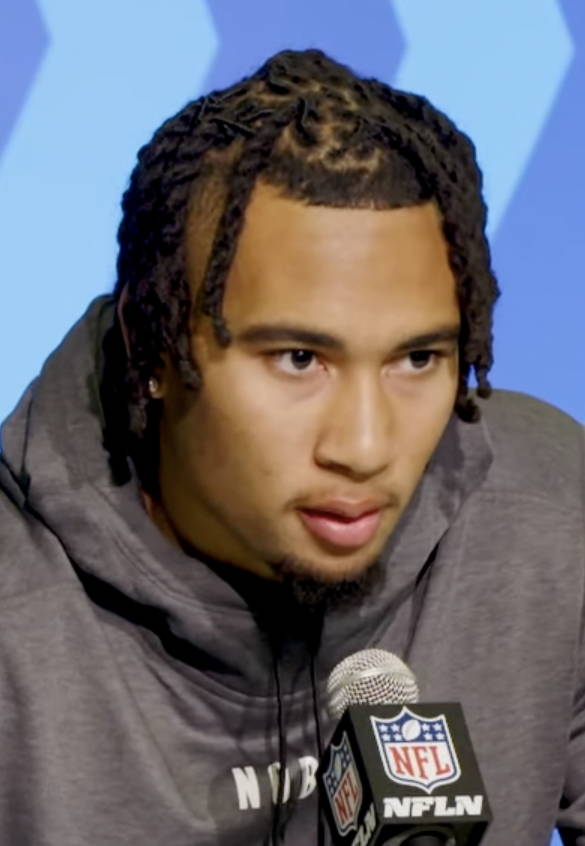
Quarterback C. J. Stroud, drafted second overall by the Houston Texans, won Offensive Rookie of the Year.

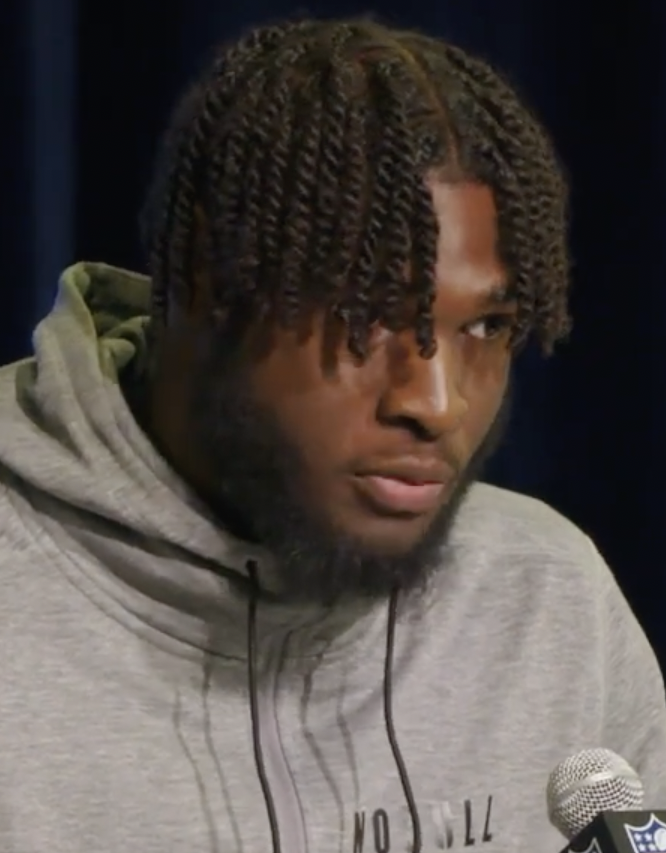
Defensive end Will Anderson Jr., drafted third overall by the Houston Texans, won Defensive Rookie of the Year.

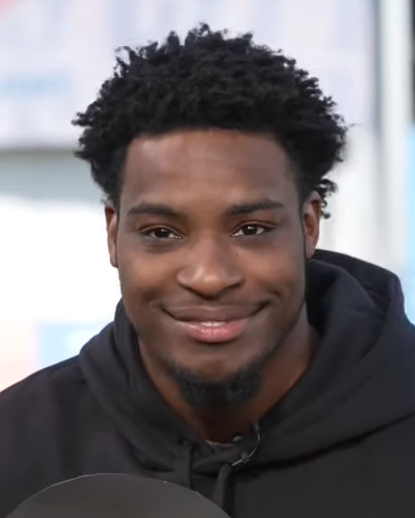
Cornerback Devon Witherspoon was drafted fifth overall by the Seattle Seahawks.

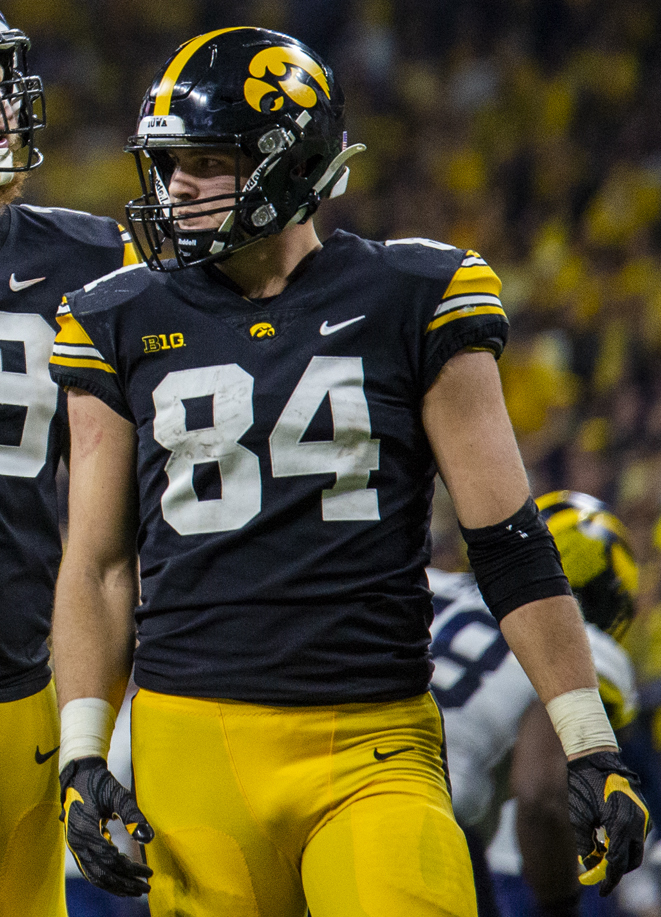
Tight end Sam LaPorta, drafted 34th overall by the Detroit Lions, broke several Lions franchise receiving records in his rookie season.

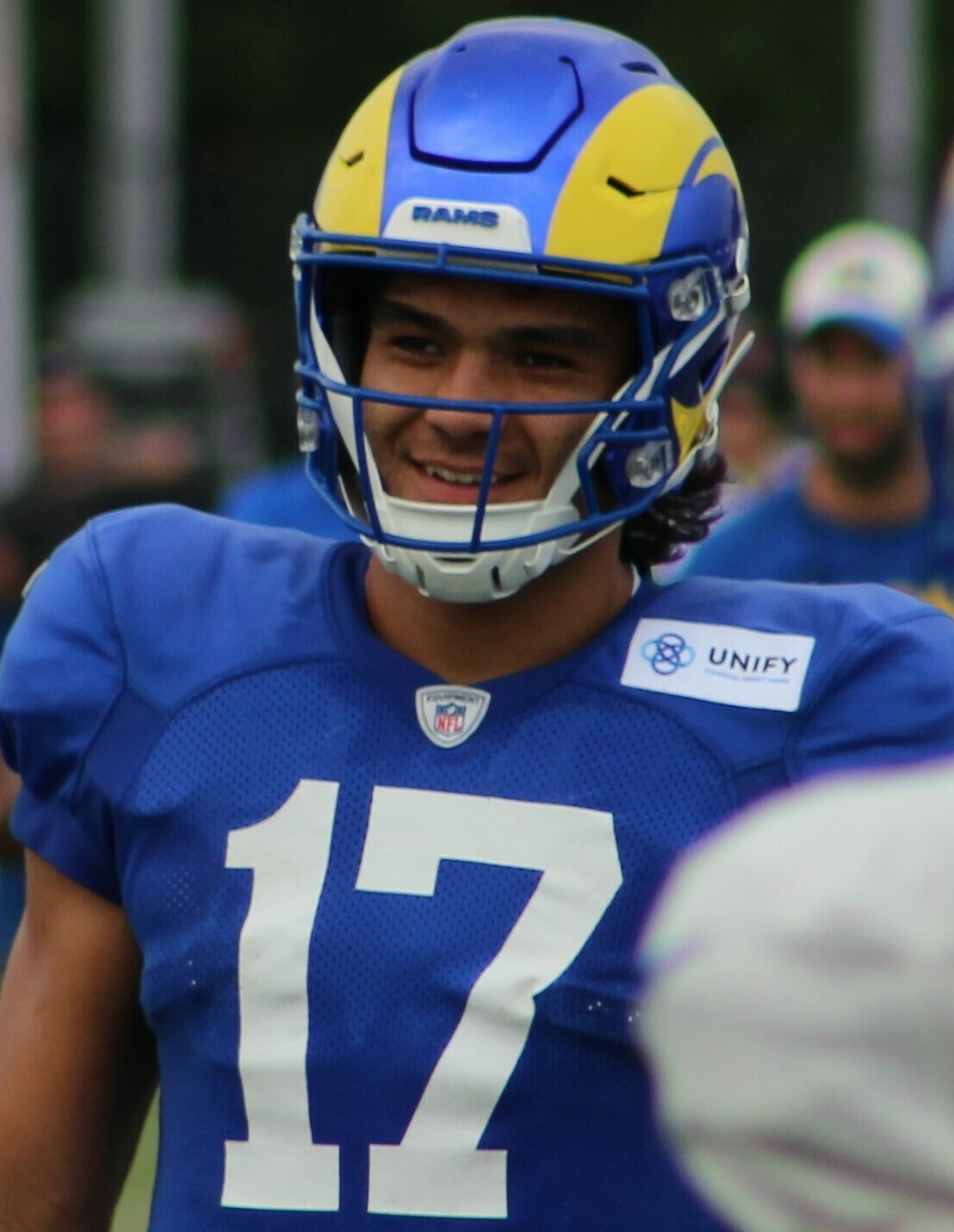
Wide receiver Puka Nacua, drafted 177th overall by the Los Angeles Rams, broke the record for most receiving yards and receptions in a season for a rookie.

Rnd.	Pick	Team	Player	Pos.	College	Notes
1	1	Carolina Panthers	Bryce Young	QB	Alabama	from Chicago (Note: No. 1: Chicago → Carolina (PD). Chicago traded a first-round selection (1st overall) to Carolina in exchange for first- and second-round selections (9th and 61st overall), a 2024 first-round selection, a 2025 second-round selection and WR D. J. Moore.)
1	2	Houston Texans	C. J. Stroud ^{†}	QB	Ohio State	
1	3	Houston Texans	Will Anderson Jr. ^{†}	LB	Alabama	from Arizona (Note: No. 3: Arizona → Houston (D). Arizona traded first- and fourth-round selections (3rd and 105th overall) to Houston in exchange for first- and second-round selections (12th and 33rd overall), and 2024 first- and third-round selections.)
1	4	Indianapolis Colts	Anthony Richardson	QB	Florida	
1	5	Seattle Seahawks	Devon Witherspoon ^{†}	CB	Illinois	from Denver (Note: No. 5: Denver → Seattle (PD). Denver traded first- and second-round selections (5th and 37th overall), 2022 first-, second- and fifth-round selections, QB Drew Lock, DT Shelby Harris and TE Noah Fant to Seattle in exchange for a 2022 fourth-round selection and QB Russell Wilson.)
1	6	Arizona Cardinals	Paris Johnson Jr.	T	Ohio State	from LA Rams via Detroit (Note: No. 6: LA Rams → Detroit → Arizona. Multiple trades: LA Rams → Detroit (PD). The LA Rams traded a first-round selection (6th overall), a 2021 third-round selection, a 2022 first-round selection and QB Jared Goff to Detroit in exchange for QB Matthew Stafford. Detroit → Arizona (D). Detroit traded first- and third-round selections (6th and 81st overall) to Arizona in exchange for first-, second- and fifth-round selections (12th, 34th and 168th overall).)
1	7	Las Vegas Raiders	Tyree Wilson	DE	Texas Tech	
1	8	Atlanta Falcons	Bijan Robinson ^{†}	RB	Texas	
1	9	Philadelphia Eagles	Jalen Carter ^{†}	DT	Georgia	from Carolina via Chicago (Note: No. 9: Carolina → Chicago → Philadelphia. Multiple trades: Carolina → Chicago (PD). See Round 1: Chicago → Carolina. Chicago → Philadelphia (D). Chicago traded a first-round selection (9th overall) to Philadelphia in exchange for a first-round selection (10th overall) and a 2024 fourth-round selection.)
1	10	Chicago Bears	Darnell Wright	T	Tennessee	from New Orleans via Philadelphia (Note: No. 10: New Orleans → Philadelphia → Chicago. Multiple trades: New Orleans → Philadelphia (PD). New Orleans traded a first-round selection (10th overall), a 2024 second-round selection, and 2022 first-, third- and seventh-round selections to Philadelphia in exchange for two 2022 first-round selections and a 2022 sixth-round selection. Philadelphia → Chicago (D). See Round 1: Chicago → Philadelphia.)
1	11	Tennessee Titans	Peter Skoronski	T	Northwestern	
1	12	Detroit Lions	Jahmyr Gibbs ^{†}	RB	Alabama	from Cleveland via Houston and Arizona (Note: No. 12: Cleveland → Houston → Arizona → Detroit. Multiple trades: Cleveland → Houston (PD). Cleveland traded first- and third-round selections (12th and 73rd overall), 2022 first- and fourth-round selections, and 2024 first- and fourth-round selections to Houston in exchange for a 2024 sixth-round selection and QB Deshaun Watson. Houston → Arizona (D). See Round 1: Arizona → Houston Arizona → Detroit (D). See Round 1: Detroit → Arizona.)
1	13	Green Bay Packers	Lukas Van Ness	DE	Iowa	from NY Jets (Note: No. 13: NY Jets → Green Bay (PD). The NY Jets traded first-, second- and sixth-round selections (13th, 42nd and 207th overall), and a conditional 2024 second-round selection to Green Bay in exchange for first- and fifth-round selections (15th and 170th overall), and QB Aaron Rodgers; the 2024 second-round pick would have become a first-rounder if Rodgers played in 65% of the snaps in 2023, but the condition was not met.)
1	14	Pittsburgh Steelers	Broderick Jones	T	Georgia	from New England (Note: No. 14: New England → Pittsburgh (D). New England traded a first-round selection (14th overall) to Pittsburgh in exchange for first- and fourth-round selections (17th and 120th overall).)
1	15	New York Jets	Will McDonald IV	DE	Iowa State	from Green Bay (Note: No. 15: Green Bay → NY Jets (PD). See Round 1: NY Jets → Green Bay.)
1	16	Washington Commanders	Emmanuel Forbes	CB	Mississippi State	
1	17	New England Patriots	Christian Gonzalez ^{†}	CB	Oregon	from Pittsburgh (Note: No. 14: Pittsburgh → New England (D). See Round 1: New England → Pittsburgh.)
1	18	Detroit Lions	Jack Campbell ^{†}	LB	Iowa	
1	19	Tampa Bay Buccaneers	Calijah Kancey	DT	Pittsburgh	
1	20	Seattle Seahawks	Jaxon Smith-Njigba ^{†}	WR	Ohio State	
1	–	Miami Dolphins	Selection forfeited (Note: Miami forfeited a first-round selection and a 2024 third-round selection as punishment for multiple violations of the league's anti-tampering policy in conversations with quarterback Tom Brady and Don Yee, the agent for then-New Orleans Saints coach Sean Payton (as well as Brady).)			
1	21	Los Angeles Chargers	Quentin Johnston	WR	TCU	
1	22	Baltimore Ravens	Zay Flowers ^{†}	WR	Boston College	
1	23	Minnesota Vikings	Jordan Addison	WR	USC	
1	24	New York Giants	Deonte Banks	CB	Maryland	from Jacksonville (Note: No. 24: Jacksonville → NY Giants (D). Jacksonville traded a first-round selection (24th overall) to the NY Giants in exchange for first-, fifth- and seventh-round selections (25th, 160th and 240th overall).)
1	25	Buffalo Bills	Dalton Kincaid ^{†}	TE	Utah	from NY Giants via Jacksonville (Note: No. 25: NY Giants → Jacksonville → Buffalo. Multiple trades: NY Giants → Jacksonville (D). See Round 1: Jacksonville → NY Giants Jacksonville → Buffalo (D). Jacksonville traded a first-round selection (25th overall) to Buffalo in exchange for first- and fourth-round selections (27th and 130th overall).)
1	26	Dallas Cowboys	Mazi Smith	DT	Michigan	
1	27	Jacksonville Jaguars	Anton Harrison	T	Oklahoma	from Buffalo (Note: No. 27: Buffalo → Jacksonville (D). See Round 1: Jacksonville → Buffalo.)
1	28	Cincinnati Bengals	Myles Murphy	DE	Clemson	
1	29	New Orleans Saints	Bryan Bresee	DT	Clemson	from San Francisco via Miami and Denver (Note: No. 29: San Francisco → Miami → Denver → New Orleans. Multiple trades: San Francisco → Miami (PD). San Francisco traded a first-round selection (29th overall), a 2021 first-round selection, and 2022 first- and third-round selections to Miami in exchange for a 2021 first-round selection. Miami → Denver (PD). Miami traded a first-round selection (29th overall), a 2024 fourth-round selection and RB Chase Edmonds to Denver in exchange for a 2025 fifth-round selection and LB Bradley Chubb. Denver → New Orleans (PD). Denver traded a first-round selection (29th overall) and a 2024 second-round selection to New Orleans in exchange for a 2024 third-round selection and the rights to Saints head coach Sean Payton.)
1	30	Philadelphia Eagles	Nolan Smith	LB	Georgia	
1	31	Kansas City Chiefs	Felix Anudike-Uzomah	DE	Kansas State	
2	32	Pittsburgh Steelers	Joey Porter Jr.	CB	Penn State	from Chicago (Note: No. 32: Chicago → Pittsburgh (PD). Chicago traded a second-round selection (32nd overall) to Pittsburgh in exchange for WR Chase Claypool.)
2	33	Tennessee Titans	Will Levis	QB	Kentucky	from Houston via Arizona (Note: No. 33: Houston → Arizona → Tennessee. Multiple trades: Houston → Arizona (D). See Round 1: Arizona → Houston Arizona → Tennessee (D). Arizona traded second- and third-round selections (33rd and 81st overall) to Tennessee in exchange for second- and third-round selections (41st and 72nd overall), and a 2024 third-round selection.)
2	34	Detroit Lions	Sam LaPorta ^{†}	TE	Iowa	from Arizona (Note: No. 34: Arizona → Detroit (D). See Round 1: Detroit → Arizona.)
2	35	Las Vegas Raiders	Michael Mayer	TE	Notre Dame	from Indianapolis (Note: No. 35: Indianapolis → Las Vegas (D). Indianapolis traded a second-round selection (35th overall) to Las Vegas in exchange for second- and fifth-round selections (38th and 141st overall).)
2	36	Los Angeles Rams	Steve Avila	G	TCU	
2	37	Seattle Seahawks	Derick Hall	LB	Auburn	from Denver (Note: No. 37: Denver → Seattle (PD). See Round 1: Denver → Seattle.)
2	38	Atlanta Falcons	Matthew Bergeron	G	Syracuse	from Las Vegas via Indianapolis (Note: No. 38: Las Vegas → Indianapolis → Atlanta. Multiple trades: Las Vegas → Indianapolis (D). See Round 2: Indianapolis → Las Vegas Indianapolis → Atlanta (D). Indianapolis traded a second-round selection (38th overall) to Atlanta in exchange for second- and fourth-round selections (44th and 110th overall).)
2	39	Carolina Panthers	Jonathan Mingo	WR	Ole Miss	
2	40	New Orleans Saints	Isaiah Foskey	DE	Notre Dame	
2	41	Arizona Cardinals	BJ Ojulari	LB	LSU	from Tennessee (Note: No. 41: Tennessee → Arizona (D). See Round 2: Arizona → Tennessee.)
2	42	Green Bay Packers	Luke Musgrave	TE	Oregon State	from Cleveland via NY Jets (Note: No. 42: Cleveland → NY Jets → Green Bay. Multiple trades: Cleveland → NY Jets (PD). Cleveland traded a second-round selection (42nd overall) to the NY Jets in exchange for a third-round selection (74th overall) and WR Elijah Moore. NY Jets → Green Bay (PD). See Round 1: NY Jets → Green Bay.)
2	43	New York Jets	Joe Tippmann	C	Wisconsin	
2	44	Indianapolis Colts	JuJu Brents	CB	Kansas State	from Atlanta (Note: No. 44: Atlanta → Indianapolis (D). See Round 2: Indianapolis → Atlanta.)
2	45	Detroit Lions	Brian Branch ^{†}	S	Alabama	from Green Bay (Note: No. 45: Green Bay → Detroit (D). Green Bay traded a second-round selection (45th overall) to Detroit in exchange for second- and fifth-round selections (48th and 159th overall).)
2	46	New England Patriots	Keion White	DE	Georgia Tech	
2	47	Washington Commanders	Quan Martin	S	Illinois	
2	48	Tampa Bay Buccaneers	Cody Mauch	G	North Dakota State	from Detroit via Green Bay (Note: No. 48: Detroit → Green Bay → Tampa Bay. Multiple trades: Detroit → Green Bay (D). See Round 2: Green Bay → Detroit Green Bay → Tampa Bay (D). Green Bay traded a second-round selection (45th overall) to Tampa Bay in exchange for second- and sixth-round selections (50th and 179th overall).)
2	49	Pittsburgh Steelers	Keeanu Benton	DT	Wisconsin	
2	50	Green Bay Packers	Jayden Reed	WR	Michigan State	from Tampa Bay (Note: No. 50: Tampa Bay → Green Bay (D). See Round 2: Green Bay → Tampa Bay.)
2	51	Miami Dolphins	Cam Smith	CB	South Carolina	
2	52	Seattle Seahawks	Zach Charbonnet	RB	UCLA	
2	53	Chicago Bears	Gervon Dexter	DT	Florida	from Baltimore (Note: No. 53: Baltimore → Chicago (PD). Baltimore traded second- and fifth-round selections (53rd and 148th overall), and LB A. J. Klein to Chicago in exchange for LB Roquan Smith.)
2	54	Los Angeles Chargers	Tuli Tuipulotu ^{†}	LB	USC	
2	55	Kansas City Chiefs	Rashee Rice	WR	SMU	from Minnesota via Detroit (Note: No. 55: Minnesota → Detroit → Kansas City. Multiple trades: Minnesota → Detroit (PD). Minnesota traded a second-round selection (55th overall) and a 2024 third-round selection to Detroit in exchange for a fourth-round selection, a conditional 2024 fourth-round selection and TE T. J. Hockenson; the 2024 fourth-round selection would have become a fifth-rounder if the Vikings won a playoff game in 2022, but the condition was not met. Detroit → Kansas City (D). Detroit traded second- and sixth-round selections (55th and 194th overall) to Kansas City in exchange for second-, fourth- and seventh-round selections (63rd, 122nd and 249th overall).)
2	56	Chicago Bears	Tyrique Stevenson	CB	Miami (FL)	from Jacksonville (Note: No. 56: Jacksonville → Chicago (D). Jacksonville traded a second-round selection (56th overall) to Chicago in exchange for second- and fifth-round selections (61st and 136th overall).)
2	57	New York Giants	John Michael Schmitz	C	Minnesota	
2	58	Dallas Cowboys	Luke Schoonmaker	TE	Michigan	
2	59	Buffalo Bills	O'Cyrus Torrence	G	Florida	
2	60	Cincinnati Bengals	D. J. Turner	CB	Michigan	
2	61	Jacksonville Jaguars	Brenton Strange	TE	Penn State	from San Francisco via Carolina and Chicago (Note: No. 61: San Francisco → Carolina → Chicago → Jacksonville (D). Multiple trades: San Francisco → Carolina (PD). San Francisco traded second-, third- and fourth-round selections (61st, 93rd and 132nd overall), and a 2024 fifth-round selection to Carolina in exchange for RB Christian McCaffrey. Carolina → Chicago (PD). See Round 1: Chicago → Carolina. Chicago → Jacksonville (D). See Round 2: Jacksonville → Chicago.)
2	62	Houston Texans	Juice Scruggs	C	Penn State	from Philadelphia (Note: No. 62: Philadelphia → Houston (D). Philadelphia traded a second-round selection (62nd overall) to Houston in exchange for third-, sixth- and seventh-round selections (65th, 188th and 230th overall).)
2	63	Denver Broncos	Marvin Mims ^{†}	WR	Oklahoma	from Kansas City via Detroit (Note: No. 63: Kansas City → Detroit → Denver. Multiple trades: Kansas City → Detroit (D). See Round 2: Detroit → Kansas City Detroit → Denver (D). Detroit traded second- and sixth-round selections (63rd and 183rd overall) to Denver in exchange for third- and fifth-round selections (68th and 138th overall).)
3	64	Chicago Bears	Zacch Pickens	DT	South Carolina	
3	65	Philadelphia Eagles	Tyler Steen	T	Alabama	from Houston (Note: No. 65: Houston → Philadelphia (D). See Round 2: Philadelphia → Houston.)
3	66	Philadelphia Eagles	Sydney Brown	S	Illinois	from Arizona (Note: No. 66: Arizona → Philadelphia (PD). Arizona traded a third-round selection (66th overall) to Philadelphia in exchange for a third-round selection (94th overall) and a 2024 fifth-round selection. The trade settled Philadelphia's tampering complaint regarding Arizona hiring Eagles defensive coordinator Jonathan Gannon as its head coach.)
3	67	Denver Broncos	Drew Sanders	LB	Arkansas	from Indianapolis (Note: No. 67: Indianapolis → Denver (PD). Indianapolis traded a third-round selection (67th overall) and a 2022 fifth-round selection to Denver in exchange for a 2022 third-round selection.)
3	68	Detroit Lions	Hendon Hooker	QB	Tennessee	from Denver (Note: No. 68: Denver → Detroit (D). See Round 2: Detroit → Denver.)
3	69	Houston Texans	Tank Dell	WR	Houston	from LA Rams (Note: No. 69: LA Rams → Houston (D). The LA Rams traded third- and sixth-round selections (69th and 191st overall) to Houston in exchange for third- and fifth-round selections (73rd and 161st overall).)
3	70	Las Vegas Raiders	Byron Young	DT	Alabama	
3	71	New Orleans Saints	Kendre Miller	RB	TCU	
3	72	Arizona Cardinals	Garrett Williams	CB	Syracuse	from Tennessee (Note: No. 72: Tennessee → Arizona (D). See Round 2: Arizona → Tennessee.)
3	73	New York Giants	Jalin Hyatt	WR	Tennessee	from Cleveland via Houston and LA Rams (Note: No. 73: Cleveland → Houston → LA Rams → NY Giants. Multiple trades: Cleveland → Houston (PD). See Round 1: Cleveland → Houston. Houston → LA Rams (D). See Round 3: LA Rams → Houston. LA Rams → NY Giants (D). LA Rams traded a third-round selection (73rd overall) to the NY Giants in exchange for third- and fourth-round selections (89th and 128th overall).)
3	74	Cleveland Browns	Cedric Tillman	WR	Tennessee	from NY Jets (Note: No. 74: NY Jets → Cleveland (PD). See Round 2: Cleveland → NY Jets.)
3	75	Atlanta Falcons	Zach Harrison	DE	Ohio State	
3	76	New England Patriots	Marte Mapu	LB	Sacramento State	from Carolina (Note: No. 76: Carolina → New England (PD). Carolina traded a third-round selection (76th overall) and a 2022 fourth-round selection to New England in exchange for a 2022 third-round selection.)
3	77	Los Angeles Rams	Byron Young ^{†}	DE	Tennessee	from New England via Miami (Note: No. 77: New England → Miami → LA Rams. Multiple trades: New England → Miami (PD). New England traded a third-round selection (77th overall) to Miami in exchange for a 2022 fifth-round selection and WR DeVante Parker. Miami → LA Rams (PD). Miami traded a third-round selection (77th overall) and TE Hunter Long to the LA Rams in exchange for CB Jalen Ramsey.)
3	78	Green Bay Packers	Tucker Kraft	TE	South Dakota State	
3	79	Indianapolis Colts	Josh Downs	WR	North Carolina	from Washington (Note: No. 79: Washington → Indianapolis (PD). Washington traded a conditional third-round selection (79th overall), and 2022 second- and third-round selections to Indianapolis in exchange for 2022 second- and seventh-round selections, and QB Carson Wentz; the third-round selection would have become a second-rounder if Wentz played on 70% of the Commanders' 2022 offensive snaps, but the condition was not met.)
3	80	Carolina Panthers	D. J. Johnson	LB	Oregon	from Pittsburgh (Note: No. 80: Pittsburgh → Carolina (D). Pittsburgh traded a third-round selection (80th overall) to Carolina in exchange for third- and fourth-round selections (93rd and 132nd overall).)
3	81	Tennessee Titans	Tyjae Spears	RB	Tulane	from Detroit via Arizona (Note: No. 81: Detroit → Arizona → Tennessee. Multiple trades: Detroit → Arizona (D). See Round 1: Detroit → Arizona Arizona → Tennessee (D). See Round 2: Arizona → Tennessee.)
3	82	Tampa Bay Buccaneers	YaYa Diaby	DE	Louisville	
3	83	Denver Broncos	Riley Moss	CB	Iowa	from Seattle (Note: No. 83: Seattle → Denver (D). Seattle traded a third-round selection (83rd overall) to Denver in exchange for a fourth-round selection (108th overall) and a 2024 third-round selection.)
3	84	Miami Dolphins	De'Von Achane ^{†}	RB	Texas A&M	
3	85	Los Angeles Chargers	Daiyan Henley	LB	Washington State	
3	86	Baltimore Ravens	Trenton Simpson	LB	Clemson	
3	87	San Francisco 49ers	Ji'Ayir Brown	S	Penn State	from Minnesota (Note: No. 87: Minnesota → San Francisco (D). Minnesota traded a third-round selection (87th overall) to San Francisco in exchange for third-, fifth- and seventh-round selections (102nd, 164th and 222nd overall).)
3	88	Jacksonville Jaguars	Tank Bigsby	RB	Auburn	
3	89	Los Angeles Rams	Kobie Turner	DT	Wake Forest	from NY Giants (Note: No. 89: NY Giants → LA Rams (D). See Round 3: LA Rams → NY Giants.)
3	90	Dallas Cowboys	DeMarvion Overshown	LB	Texas	
3	91	Buffalo Bills	Dorian Williams	LB	Tulane	
3	92	Kansas City Chiefs	Wanya Morris	T	Oklahoma	from Cincinnati (Note: No. 92: Cincinnati → Kansas City (D). Cincinnati traded a third-round selection (92nd overall) to Kansas City in exchange for third- and sixth-round selections (95th and 217th overall).)
3	93	Pittsburgh Steelers	Darnell Washington	TE	Georgia	from San Francisco via Carolina (Note: No. 93: San Francisco → Carolina → Pittsburgh. Multiple trades: San Francisco → Carolina (PD). See Round 2: San Francisco → Carolina Carolina → Pittsburgh (D). See Round 3: Pittsburgh → Carolina.)
3	94	Arizona Cardinals	Michael Wilson	WR	Stanford	from Philadelphia (Note: No. 94: Philadelphia → Arizona (PD). See Round 3: Arizona → Philadelphia.)
3	95	Cincinnati Bengals	Jordan Battle	S	Alabama	from Kansas City (Note: No. 95: Kansas City → Cincinnati (D). See Round 3: Cincinnati → Kansas City.)
3*	96	Detroit Lions	Brodric Martin	DT	Western Kentucky	from Arizona (Note: No. 96: Arizona → Detroit (D). Arizona traded a third-round selection (96th overall) to Detroit in exchange for a fourth-round selection and two fifth-round selections (122nd, 139th and 168th overall).)
3*	97	Washington Commanders	Ricky Stromberg	C	Arkansas	
3×	98	Cleveland Browns	Siaki Ika	DT	Baylor	Resolution JC-2A selection (Note: Cleveland received a third-round selection along with a 2022 third-round selection when Minnesota hired former Cleveland vice president of football operations Kwesi Adofo-Mensah as general manager.)
3×	99	San Francisco 49ers	Jake Moody	K	Michigan	Resolution JC-2A selection (Note: San Francisco received a third-round selection when Washington hired former San Francisco vice president of player personnel Martin Mayhew as general manager.)
3×	100	Las Vegas Raiders	Tre Tucker	WR	Cincinnati	Resolution JC-2A selection; (Note: Kansas City received a third-round selection (100th overall) and a 2022 third-round selection as compensation for Chicago hiring executive director of player personnel Ryan Poles as general manager.) from Kansas City via NY Giants (Note: No. 100: Kansas City → NY Giants → Las Vegas. Multiple trades: Kansas City → NY Giants (PD). Kansas City traded third- and sixth-round selections (100th and 209th overall) to NY Giants in exchange for WR Kadarius Toney. NY Giants → Las Vegas (PD). NY Giants traded a third-round selection (100th overall) to Las Vegas in exchange for TE Darren Waller.)
3×	101	San Francisco 49ers	Cameron Latu	TE	Alabama	Resolution JC-2A selection (Note: San Francisco received a third-round selection (101st overall) and a 2022 third-round selection as compensation for Miami hiring offensive coordinator Mike McDaniel as head coach.)
3×	102	Minnesota Vikings	Mekhi Blackmon	CB	USC	Resolution JC-2A selection; (Note: San Francisco received a third-round selection (102nd overall) and a 2024 third-round selection as compensation for Tennessee hiring director of player personnel Ran Carthon as general manager.) from San Francisco (Note: No. 102: San Francisco → Minnesota (D). See Round 3: Minnesota → San Francisco.)
4	103	New Orleans Saints	Nick Saldiveri	T	Old Dominion	from Chicago (Note: No. 103: Chicago → New Orleans (D). Chicago traded a fourth-round selection (103rd overall) to New Orleans in exchange for fourth- and fifth-round selections (115th and 165th overall).)
4	104	Las Vegas Raiders	Jakorian Bennett	CB	Maryland	from Houston (Note: No. 104: Houston → Las Vegas (D). Houston traded fourth- and sixth-round selections (104th and 203rd overall) to Las Vegas in exchange for fourth- and fifth-round selections (109th and 174th overall).)
4	105	Philadelphia Eagles	Kelee Ringo	CB	Georgia	from Arizona via Houston (Note: No. 105: Arizona → Houston → Philadelphia. Multiple trades: Arizona → Houston (D). See Round 1: Arizona → Houston Houston → Philadelphia (D). Houston traded a fourth-round selection (105th overall) to Philadelphia in exchange for a 2024 third-round selection.)
4	106	Indianapolis Colts	Blake Freeland	T	BYU	
4	107	New England Patriots	Jake Andrews	C	Troy	from LA Rams (Note: No. 107: LA Rams → New England (PD). The LA Rams traded a fourth-round selection (107th overall) and a 2022 sixth-round selection to New England in exchange for RB Sony Michel.)
4	108	Seattle Seahawks	Anthony Bradford	G	LSU	from Denver (Note: No. 108: Denver → Seattle (D). See Round 3: Seattle → Denver.)
4	109	Houston Texans	Dylan Horton	DE	TCU	from Las Vegas (Note: No. 109: Las Vegas → Houston (D). See Round 4: Houston → Las Vegas.)
4	110	Indianapolis Colts	Adetomiwa Adebawore	DT	Northwestern	from Tennessee via Atlanta (Note: No. 110: Tennessee → Atlanta → Indianapolis. Multiple trades: Tennessee → Atlanta (PD). Tennessee traded a fourth-round selection (110th overall) and a 2022 second-round selection to Atlanta in exchange for a sixth-round selection (186th overall) and WR Julio Jones. Atlanta → Indianapolis (D). See Round 2: Indianapolis → Atlanta.)
4	111	Cleveland Browns	Dawand Jones	T	Ohio State	
4	112	New England Patriots	Chad Ryland	K	Maryland	from NY Jets (Note: No. 112: NY Jets → New England (D). NY Jets traded a fourth-round selection (112th overall) to New England in exchange for fourth- and sixth-round selections (120th and 184th overall).)
4	113	Atlanta Falcons	Clark Phillips III	CB	Utah	
4	114	Carolina Panthers	Chandler Zavala	G	NC State	
4	115	Chicago Bears	Roschon Johnson	RB	Texas	from New Orleans (Note: No. 115: New Orleans → Chicago (D). See Round 4: Chicago → New Orleans.)
4	116	Green Bay Packers	Colby Wooden	DT	Auburn	
4	117	New England Patriots	Sidy Sow	G	Eastern Michigan	
4	118	Washington Commanders	Braeden Daniels	T	Utah	
4	119	Kansas City Chiefs	Chamarri Conner	S	Virginia Tech	from Detroit via Minnesota (Note: No. 119: Detroit → Minnesota → Kansas City. Multiple trades: Detroit → Minnesota (PD). See Round 2: Minnesota → Detroit Minnesota → Kansas City (D). Minnesota traded a fourth-round selection (119th overall) to Kansas City in exchange for a fourth-round selection (134th overall) and a 2024 fifth-round selection.)
4	120	New York Jets	Carter Warren	T	Pittsburgh	from Pittsburgh via New England (Note: No. 120: Pittsburgh → New England → NY Jets. Multiple trades: Pittsburgh → New England (D). See Round 1: New England → Pittsburgh New England → NY Jets (D). See Round 4: NY Jets → New England.)
4	121	Jacksonville Jaguars	Ventrell Miller	LB	Florida	from Tampa Bay (Note: No. 121: Tampa Bay → Jacksonville (PD). Tampa Bay traded a fourth-round selection (121st overall) to Jacksonville in exchange for 2022 fifth- and seventh-round selections.)
4	122	Arizona Cardinals	Jon Gaines II	G	UCLA	from Miami via Kansas City and Detroit (Note: No. 122: Miami → Kansas City → Detroit → Arizona. Multiple trades: Miami → Kansas City (PD). Miami traded fourth- and sixth-round selections (122nd and 178th overall), and 2022 first-, second- and fourth-round selections to Kansas City in exchange for WR Tyreek Hill. Kansas City → Detroit (D). See Round 2: Detroit → Kansas City Detroit → Arizona (D). See Round 3: Arizona → Detroit.)
4	123	Seattle Seahawks	Cameron Young	DT	Mississippi State	
4	124	Baltimore Ravens	Tavius Robinson	LB	Ole Miss	
4	125	Los Angeles Chargers	Derius Davis	WR	TCU	
4	126	Cleveland Browns	Isaiah McGuire	DE	Missouri	from Minnesota (Note: No. 126: Minnesota → Cleveland (PD). Minnesota traded a fourth-round selection (126th overall) and a 2022 fifth-round selection to Cleveland in exchange for a 2022 fourth-round selection.)
4	127	New Orleans Saints	Jake Haener	QB	Fresno State	from Jacksonville (Note: No. 127: Jacksonville → New Orleans (D). Jacksonville traded a fourth-round selection (127th overall) to New Orleans in exchange for a seventh-round selection (227th overall) and a 2024 fourth-round selection.)
4	128	Los Angeles Rams	Stetson Bennett	QB	Georgia	from NY Giants (Note: No. 128: NY Giants → LA Rams (D). See Round 3: LA Rams → NY Giants.)
4	129	Dallas Cowboys	Viliami Fehoko	DE	San Jose State	
4	130	Jacksonville Jaguars	Tyler Lacy	DE	Oklahoma State	from Buffalo (Note: No. 130: Buffalo → Jacksonville (D). See Round 1: Jacksonville → Buffalo.)
4	131	Cincinnati Bengals	Charlie Jones	WR	Purdue	
4	132	Pittsburgh Steelers	Nick Herbig	LB	Wisconsin	from San Francisco via Carolina (Note: No. 132: San Francisco → Carolina → Pittsburgh. Multiple trades: San Francisco → Carolina (PD). See Round 2: San Francisco → Carolina. Carolina → Pittsburgh (D). See Round 3: Pittsburgh → Carolina.)
4	133	Chicago Bears	Tyler Scott	WR	Cincinnati	from Philadelphia (Note: No. 133: Philadelphia → Chicago (PD). Philadelphia traded a fourth-round selection (133rd overall) to Chicago in exchange for DE Robert Quinn.)
4	134	Minnesota Vikings	Jay Ward	S	LSU	from Kansas City (Note: No. 134: Kansas City → Minnesota (D). See Round 4: Minnesota → Kansas City.)
4*	135	Las Vegas Raiders	Aidan O'Connell	QB	Purdue	from New England (Note: No. 135: New England → Las Vegas (D). New England traded a fourth-round selection (135th overall) to Las Vegas in exchange for fifth- and sixth-round selections (144th and 214th overall).)
5	136	Jacksonville Jaguars	Yasir Abdullah	LB	Louisville	from Chicago (Note: No. 136: Chicago → Jacksonville (D). See Round 2: Jacksonville → Chicago.)
5	–	Houston Texans	Selection forfeited (Note: Houston forfeited a fifth-round selection as punishment for a salary cap reporting violation.)			
5	137	Washington Commanders	KJ Henry	DE	Clemson	from Arizona via Buffalo (Note: No. 119: Arizona → Buffalo → Washington. Multiple trades: Arizona → Buffalo (PD). Arizona traded a fifth-round selection (137th overall) to Buffalo in exchange for G Cody Ford. Buffalo → Washington (D). Buffalo traded a fifth-round selection (137th overall) to Washington in exchange for fifth- and sixth-round selections (150th and 215th overall).)
5	138	Indianapolis Colts	Darius Rush	CB	South Carolina	
5	139	Arizona Cardinals	Clayton Tune	QB	Houston	from Denver via Detroit (Note: No. 139: Denver → Detroit → Arizona. Multiple trades: Denver → Detroit (D). See Round 2: Detroit → Denver. Detroit → Arizona (D). See Round 3: Arizona → Detroit.)
5	140	Cleveland Browns	Dorian Thompson-Robinson	QB	UCLA	from LA Rams (Note: No. 140: LA Rams → Cleveland (PD). LA Rams traded a fifth-round selection (140th overall) to Cleveland in exchange for CB Troy Hill.)
5	141	Minnesota Vikings	Jaquelin Roy	DT	LSU	from Las Vegas via Indianapolis (Note: No. 141: Las Vegas → Indianapolis → Minnesota. Multiple trades: Las Vegas → Indianapolis (D). See Round 2: Indianapolis → Las Vegas Indianapolis → Minnesota (D). Indianapolis traded a fifth-round selection (141st overall) to Minnesota in exchange for fifth- and sixth-round selections (158th and 211th overall).)
5	142	Cleveland Browns	Cameron Mitchell	CB	Northwestern	
5	143	New York Jets	Israel Abanikanda	RB	Pittsburgh	
5	144	New England Patriots	Atonio Mafi	G	UCLA	from Atlanta via Las Vegas (Note: No. 144: Atlanta → Las Vegas → New England. Multiple trades: Atlanta → Las Vegas (PD). Atlanta traded a fifth-round selection (144th overall) to Las Vegas in exchange for a seventh-round selection (224th overall) and WR Bryan Edwards. Las Vegas → New England. See Round 4: New England → Las Vegas.)
5	145	Carolina Panthers	Jammie Robinson	S	Florida State	
5	146	New Orleans Saints	Jordan Howden	S	Minnesota	
5	147	Tennessee Titans	Josh Whyle	TE	Cincinnati	
5	148	Chicago Bears	Noah Sewell	LB	Oregon	from New England via Baltimore (Note: No. 148: New England → Baltimore → Chicago. Multiple trades: New England → Baltimore (PD). New England traded a fifth-round selection (148th overall) and a 2022 seventh-round selection to Baltimore in exchange for CB Shaun Wade. Baltimore → Chicago (PD). See Round 2: Baltimore → Chicago.)
5	149	Green Bay Packers	Sean Clifford	QB	Penn State	
5	150	Buffalo Bills	Justin Shorter	WR	Florida	from Washington (Note: No. 150: Washington → Buffalo (D). See Round 5: Buffalo → Washington.)
5	151	Seattle Seahawks	Mike Morris	DE	Michigan	from Pittsburgh (Note: No. 151: Pittsburgh → Seattle (PD). Pittsburgh traded a fifth-round selection (151st overall) to Seattle in exchange for CB Ahkello Witherspoon.)
5	152	Detroit Lions	Colby Sorsdal	T	William & Mary	
5	153	Tampa Bay Buccaneers	SirVocea Dennis	LB	Pittsburgh	
5	154	Seattle Seahawks	Olu Oluwatimi	C	Michigan	
5	155	San Francisco 49ers	Darrell Luter Jr.	CB	South Alabama	from Miami (Note: No. 155: Miami → San Francisco (PD). Miami traded a fifth-round selection (155th overall) to San Francisco in exchange for RB Jeff Wilson.)
5	156	Los Angeles Chargers	Jordan McFadden	G	Clemson	
5	157	Baltimore Ravens	Kyu Blu Kelly	CB	Stanford	
5	158	Indianapolis Colts	Daniel Scott	S	California	from Minnesota (Note: No. 158: Minnesota → Indianapolis (D). See Round 5: Indianapolis → Minnesota.)
5	159	Green Bay Packers	Dontayvion Wicks	WR	Virginia	from Jacksonville via Atlanta and Detroit (Note: No. 159: Jacksonville → Atlanta → Detroit → Green Bay. Multiple trades: Jacksonville → Atlanta (PD). Jacksonville traded a fifth-round selection (159th overall) and a 2024 third-round selection to Atlanta in exchange for WR Calvin Ridley. Atlanta → Detroit (PD). Atlanta traded a fifth-round selection (159th overall) to Detroit in exchange for CB Jeff Okudah. Detroit → Green Bay. See Round 2: Green Bay → Detroit.)
5	160	Jacksonville Jaguars	Antonio Johnson	S	Texas A&M	from NY Giants (Note: No. 160: NY Giants → Jacksonville (D). See Round 1: Jacksonville → NY Giants.)
5	161	Los Angeles Rams	Nick Hampton	LB	Appalachian State	from Dallas via Houston (Note: No. 161: Dallas → Houston → LA Rams. Multiple trades: Dallas → Houston (PD). Dallas traded a fifth-round selection (161st overall) and a 2024 sixth-round selection to Houston in exchange for WR Brandin Cooks. Houston → LA Rams (D). See Round 3: LA Rams → Houston.)
5	162	Indianapolis Colts	Will Mallory	TE	Miami (FL)	from Buffalo (Note: No. 162: Buffalo → Indianapolis (PD). Buffalo traded a fifth-round selection (162nd overall) and RB Zack Moss to Indianapolis in exchange for RB Nyheim Hines.)
5	163	Cincinnati Bengals	Chase Brown	RB	Illinois	
5	164	Minnesota Vikings	Jaren Hall	QB	BYU	from San Francisco (Note: No. 164: San Francisco → Minnesota (D). See Round 3: Minnesota → San Francisco.)
5	165	Chicago Bears	Terell Smith	CB	Minnesota	from Philadelphia via New Orleans (Note: No. 165: Philadelphia → New Orleans → Chicago. Multiple trades: Philadelphia → New Orleans (PD). Philadelphia traded a fifth-round selection (165th overall) and a 2024 sixth-round selection to New Orleans in exchange for a 2025 seventh-round selection and S C. J. Gardner-Johnson. New Orleans → Chicago (D). See Round 4: Chicago → New Orleans.)
5	166	Kansas City Chiefs	B. J. Thompson	LB	Stephen F. Austin	
5*	167	Houston Texans	Henry To'oTo'o	LB	Alabama	from LA Rams (Note: No. 167: LA Rams → Houston (D). LA Rams traded a fifth-round selection (167th overall) to Houston in exchange for fifth- and seventh-round selections (174th and 259th overall).)
5*	168	Arizona Cardinals	Owen Pappoe	LB	Auburn	from Arizona via Detroit (Note: No. 168: Arizona → Detroit → Arizona. Multiple trades: Arizona → Detroit (D). See Round 1: Detroit → Arizona. Detroit → Arizona (D). See Round 3: Arizona → Detroit.)
5*	169	Dallas Cowboys	Asim Richards	T	North Carolina	
5*	170	Las Vegas Raiders	Chris Smith II	S	Georgia	from Green Bay via NY Jets (Note: No. 170: Green Bay → NY Jets → Las Vegas. Multiple trades: Green Bay → NY Jets. See Round 1: NY Jets → Green Bay. NY Jets → Las Vegas. NY Jets traded a fifth-round selection (170th overall) to Las Vegas in exchange for sixth- and seventh-round selections (204th and 220th overall).)
5*	171	Tampa Bay Buccaneers	Payne Durham	TE	Purdue	from LA Rams (Note: No. 171: LA Rams → Tampa Bay (D). LA Rams traded a fifth-round selection (171st overall) to Tampa Bay in exchange for fifth- and seventh-round selections (175th and 252nd overall).)
5*	172	New York Giants	Eric Gray	RB	Oklahoma	
5*	173	San Francisco 49ers	Robert Beal Jr.	LB	Georgia	
5*	174	Los Angeles Rams	Warren McClendon	T	Georgia	from Las Vegas via Houston (Note: No. 174: Las Vegas → Houston → LA Rams. Multiple trades: Las Vegas → Houston (D). See Round 4: Houston → Las Vegas. Houston → LA Rams (D). See Round 5: LA Rams → Houston.)
5*	175	Los Angeles Rams	Davis Allen	TE	Clemson	from Tampa Bay (Note: No. 175: Tampa Bay → LA Rams (D). See Round 5: LA Rams → Tampa Bay.)
5*	176	Indianapolis Colts	Evan Hull	RB	Northwestern	from Dallas (Note: No. 176: Dallas → Indianapolis (PD). Dallas traded a fifth-round selection (176th overall) to Indianapolis in exchange for CB Stephon Gilmore.)
5*	177	Los Angeles Rams	Puka Nacua ^{†}	WR	BYU	
6	178	Dallas Cowboys	Eric Scott Jr.	CB	Southern Miss	from Chicago via Miami and Kansas City (Note: No. 178: Chicago → Miami → Kansas City → Dallas. Multiple trades: Chicago → Miami (PD). Chicago traded a sixth-round selection (178th overall) to Miami in exchange for WR Jakeem Grant. Miami → Kansas City (PD). See Round 4: Miami → Kansas City. Kansas City → Dallas (D). Kansas City traded a sixth-round selection (178th overall) to Dallas in exchange for a 2024 fifth-round selection.)
6	179	Green Bay Packers	Karl Brooks	DT	Bowling Green	from Houston via Tampa Bay (Note: No. 179: Houston → Tampa Bay → Green Bay. Multiple trades: Houston → Tampa Bay (PD). Houston traded a sixth-round selection (179th overall) to Tampa Bay in exchange for a seventh-round selection (230th overall) and G Shaq Mason. Tampa Bay → Green Bay (D). See Round 2: Green Bay → Tampa Bay.)
6	180	Arizona Cardinals	Kei'Trel Clark	CB	Louisville	
6	181	Tampa Bay Buccaneers	Josh Hayes	CB	Kansas State	from Indianapolis (Note: No. 181: Indianapolis → Tampa Bay (PD). Indianapolis traded a sixth-round selection (181st overall) to Tampa Bay in exchange for a seventh-round selection (236th overall) and LB Grant Stuard.)
6	182	Los Angeles Rams	Tre Tomlinson	CB	TCU	
6	183	Denver Broncos	JL Skinner	S	Boise State	from Denver via Detroit (Note: No. 183: Denver → Detroit → Denver. Multiple trades: Denver → Detroit (PD). Denver traded a sixth-round selection (183rd overall) and WR Trinity Benson to Detroit in exchange for 2022 fifth- and seventh-round selections. Detroit → Denver (D). See Round 2: Detroit → Denver.)
6	184	New York Jets	Zaire Barnes	LB	Western Michigan	from Las Vegas via New England (Note: No. 184: Las Vegas → New England → NY Jets. Multiple trades: Las Vegas → New England (PD). Las Vegas traded a sixth-round selection (184th overall) to New England in exchange for a seventh-round selection (231st overall) and QB Jarrett Stidham. New England → NY Jets. See Round 4: NY Jets → New England.)
6	185	Jacksonville Jaguars	Parker Washington	WR	Penn State	from NY Jets (Note: No. 185: NY Jets → Jacksonville (PD). NY Jets traded a sixth-round selection (185th overall) to Jacksonville in exchange for RB James Robinson.)
6	186	Tennessee Titans	Jaelyn Duncan	T	Maryland	from Atlanta (Note: No. 186: Atlanta → Tennessee (PD). See Round 4: Tennessee → Atlanta.)
6	187	New England Patriots	Kayshon Boutte	WR	LSU	from Carolina (Note: No. 187: Carolina → New England (PD). Carolina traded a sixth-round selection (187th overall) to New England in exchange for CB Stephon Gilmore.)
6	188	Philadelphia Eagles	Tanner McKee	QB	Stanford	from New Orleans via Houston (Note: No. 188: New Orleans → Houston → Philadelphia. Multiple trades: New Orleans → Houston (PD). New Orleans traded a sixth-round selection (188th overall) and a 2022 third-round selection to Houston in exchange for CB Bradley Roby. Houston → Philadelphia (D). See Round 2: Philadelphia → Houston.)
6	189	Los Angeles Rams	Ochaun Mathis	DE	Nebraska	from Tennessee (Note: No. 189: Tennessee → LA Rams (PD). Tennessee traded a sixth-round selection (189th overall) to the LA Rams in exchange for WR Robert Woods.)
6	190	Cleveland Browns	Luke Wypler	C	Ohio State	
6	191	Tampa Bay Buccaneers	Trey Palmer	WR	Nebraska	from Green Bay via LA Rams, Houston and Philadelphia (Note: No. 191: Green Bay → LA Rams → Houston → Philadelphia → Tampa Bay. Multiple trades: Green Bay → LA Rams (PD). Green Bay traded a sixth-round selection (191st overall) to the LA Rams in exchange for a seventh-round selection (235th overall) and P Corey Bojorquez. LA Rams → Houston (D). See Round 3: LA Rams → Houston. Houston → Philadelphia (D). Houston traded a sixth-round selection (191st overall) to Philadelphia in exchange for two seventh-round selections (230th and 248th overall). Philadelphia → Tampa Bay (D). Philadelphia traded a sixth-round selection (191st overall) to Tampa Bay in exchange for a 2024 fifth-round selection.)
6	192	New England Patriots	Bryce Baringer	P	Michigan State	
6	193	Washington Commanders	Chris Rodriguez Jr.	RB	Kentucky	
6	194	Kansas City Chiefs	Keondre Coburn	DT	Texas	from Detroit (Note: No. 194: Detroit → Kansas City (D). See Round 2: Detroit → Kansas City,)
6	195	New Orleans Saints	A. T. Perry	WR	Wake Forest	from Pittsburgh via Denver (Note: No. 195: Pittsburgh → Denver → New Orleans. Multiple trades: No. 195: Pittsburgh → Denver (PD). Pittsburgh traded a sixth-round selection (195th overall) to Denver in exchange for a seventh-round selection (241st overall) and LB Malik Reed. Denver → New Orleans (D). Denver traded a sixth-round selection (195th overall) to New Orleans in exchange for a seventh-round selection (257th overall) and TE Adam Trautman.)
6	196	Tampa Bay Buccaneers	Jose Ramirez	LB	Eastern Michigan	
6	197	Miami Dolphins	Elijah Higgins	TE	Stanford	
6	198	Seattle Seahawks	Jerrick Reed II	S	New Mexico	
6	199	Baltimore Ravens	Malaesala Aumavae–Laulu	T	Oregon	
6	200	Los Angeles Chargers	Scott Matlock	DT	Boise State	from LA Chargers via Chicago (Note: No. 200: LA Chargers → Chicago → LA Chargers. Multiple trades: LA Chargers → Chicago (PD). The LA Chargers traded a sixth-round selection (200th overall) and a 2022 second-round selection to Chicago in exchange for LB Khalil Mack. Chicago → LA Chargers (PD). Chicago traded a sixth-round selection (200th overall) to the LA Chargers in exchange for two 2022 seventh-round selections.)
6	201	Houston Texans	Jarrett Patterson	C	Notre Dame	from Minnesota (Note: No. 201: Minnesota → Houston (PD). Minnesota traded a sixth-round selection (201st overall) to Houston in exchange for a seventh-round selection (219th overall) and DE Ross Blacklock.)
6	202	Jacksonville Jaguars	Christian Braswell	CB	Rutgers	
6	203	Las Vegas Raiders	Amari Burney	LB	Florida	from NY Giants via Houston (Note: No. 203: NY Giants → Houston → Las Vegas. Multiple trades: NY Giants → Houston (PD). NY Giants traded a sixth-round selection (203rd overall) to Houston in exchange for CB Keion Crossen. Houston → Las Vegas (D). See Round 4: Houston → Las Vegas.)
6	204	New York Jets	Jarrick Bernard-Converse	CB	LSU	from Dallas via Las Vegas (Note: No. 204: Dallas → Las Vegas → NY Jets. Multiple trades: Dallas → Las Vegas (PD). Dallas traded a sixth-round selection (204th overall) to Las Vegas in exchange for a 2024 seventh-round selection and DT Johnathan Hankins. Las Vegas → NY Jets. See Round 5: NY Jets → Las Vegas.)
6	205	Houston Texans	Xavier Hutchinson	WR	Iowa State	from Buffalo (Note: No. 205: Buffalo → Houston (D). Buffalo traded a sixth-round selection (205th overall) to Houston in exchange for a seventh-round selection (230th overall) and a 2024 sixth-round selection.)
6	206	Cincinnati Bengals	Andrei Iosivas	WR	Princeton	
6	207	Green Bay Packers	Anders Carlson	K	Auburn	from San Francisco via Houston and NY Jets (Note: No. 207: San Francisco → Houston → NY Jets → Green Bay. Multiple trades: San Francisco → Houston (PD). San Francisco traded a sixth-round selection (207th overall) to Houston in exchange for DE Charles Omenihu. Houston → NY Jets (PD). Houston traded a sixth-round selection (207th overall) to NY Jets in exchange for LB Blake Cashman. NY Jets → Green Bay (PD). See Round 1: NY Jets → Green Bay.)
6	208	Jacksonville Jaguars	Erick Hallett	S	Pittsburgh	from Philadelphia (Note: No. 208: Philadelphia → Jacksonville (PD). Philadelphia traded a sixth-round selection (208th overall) and CB Jameson Houston to Jacksonville in exchange for CB Josiah Scott.)
6	209	New York Giants	Tre Hawkins	CB	Old Dominion	from Kansas City (Note: No. 209: Kansas City → NY Giants (PD). See Round 4: NY Giants → Kansas City.)
6*	210	New England Patriots	Demario Douglas	WR	Liberty	
6*	211	Indianapolis Colts	Titus Leo	LB	Wagner	from Minnesota (Note: No. 211: Minnesota → Indianapolis (D). See Round 5: Indianapolis → Minnesota.)
6*	212	Dallas Cowboys	Deuce Vaughn	RB	Kansas State	
6*	213	Arizona Cardinals	Dante Stills	DT	West Virginia	
6*	214	New England Patriots	Ameer Speed	CB	Michigan State	from Las Vegas (Note: No. 214: Las Vegas → New England (D). See Round 4: New England → Las Vegas.)
6*	215	Los Angeles Rams	Zach Evans	RB	Ole Miss	from Washington via Buffalo (Note: No. 215: Washington → Buffalo → LA Rams. Multiple trades: Washington → Buffalo (D). See Round 5: Buffalo → Washington. Buffalo → LA Rams (D). Buffalo traded a sixth-round selection (215th overall) to LA Rams in exchange for a seventh-round selection (252nd overall) and a 2024 sixth-round selection.)
6*	216	San Francisco 49ers	Dee Winters	LB	TCU	
6*	217	Cincinnati Bengals	Brad Robbins	P	Michigan	from Kansas City (Note: No. 217: Kansas City → Cincinnati (D). See Round 3: Cincinnati → Kansas City.)
7	218	Chicago Bears	Travis Bell	DT	Kennesaw State	
7	219	Detroit Lions	Antoine Green	WR	North Carolina	from Houston via Minnesota and Philadelphia (Note: No. 219: Houston → Minnesota → Philadelphia → Detroit. Multiple trades: Houston → Minnesota (PD). See Round 6: Minnesota → Houston. Minnesota → Philadelphia (PD). Minnesota traded a seventh-round selection (219th overall) and a conditional 2024 fifth-round selection to Philadelphia in exchange for WR Jalen Reagor; the 2024 fifth-round selection would have become a fourth-round selection if Reagor had 40 receptions, 500 receiving yards or 5 touchdowns in either 2022 or 2023, but the condition was not met. Philadelphia → Detroit (D). Philadelphia traded a seventh-round selection (219th overall) and a 2025 fourth-round selection to Detroit in exchange for a seventh-round selection (249th overall) and RB D'Andre Swift.)
7	220	New York Jets	Zack Kuntz	TE	Old Dominion	from Arizona via Las Vegas (Note: No. 220: Arizona → Las Vegas → NY Jets. Multiple trades: Arizona → Las Vegas (PD). Arizona traded a conditional seventh-round selection (220th overall) to Las Vegas in exchange for CB Trayvon Mullen; the seventh-round selection would have become a sixth-rounder if Mullen was active for 10 games for the Cardinals in 2023, but the condition was not met. Las Vegas → NY Jets. See Round 5: NY Jets → Las Vegas.)
7	221	Indianapolis Colts	Jaylon Jones	CB	Texas A&M	
7	222	Minnesota Vikings	DeWayne McBride	RB	UAB	from Denver via San Francisco (Note: No. 222: Denver → San Francisco → Minnesota. Multiple trades: Denver → San Francisco (PD). Denver traded a seventh-round selection (222nd overall) and a 2022 sixth-round selection to San Francisco in exchange for a 2022 seventh-round selection and LB Jonas Griffith. San Francisco → Minnesota. See Round 3: Minnesota → San Francisco.)
7	223	Los Angeles Rams	Ethan Evans	P	Wingate	
7	224	Atlanta Falcons	DeMarcco Hellams	S	Alabama	from Las Vegas (Note: No. 224: Las Vegas → Atlanta (PD). See Round 5: Atlanta → Las Vegas.)
7	225	Atlanta Falcons	Jovaughn Gwyn	G	South Carolina	
7	226	Jacksonville Jaguars	Cooper Hodges	T	Appalachian State	from Carolina (Note: No. 225: Carolina → Jacksonville (PD). Carolina traded a seventh-round selection (226th overall) and a 2024 sixth-round selection to Jacksonville in exchange for WR Laviska Shenault.)
7	227	Jacksonville Jaguars	Raymond Vohasek	DT	North Carolina	from New Orleans (Note: No. 227: New Orleans → Jacksonville (D). See Round 4: Jacksonville → New Orleans.)
7	228	Tennessee Titans	Colton Dowell	WR	UT Martin	
7	229	Baltimore Ravens	Andrew Vorhees	G	USC	from Cleveland (Note: No. 229: Cleveland → Baltimore (D). Cleveland traded a seventh-round selection (229th overall) to Baltimore in exchange for a 2024 sixth-round selection.)
7	230	Buffalo Bills	Nick Broeker	G	Ole Miss	from NY Jets via Tampa Bay, Houston, Philadelphia and Houston (Note: No. 230: NY Jets → Tampa Bay → Houston → Philadelphia → Houston → Buffalo. Multiple trades: NY Jets → Tampa Bay (PD). NY Jets traded a seventh-round selection (230th overall) and DT Steve McLendon to Tampa Bay in exchange for a 2022 sixth-round selection. Tampa Bay → Houston (PD). See Round 6: Houston → Tampa Bay. Houston → Philadelphia (D). See Round 2: Philadelphia → Houston. Philadelphia → Houston (D). See Round 6: Houston → Philadelphia. Houston → Buffalo (D). See Round 6: Buffalo → Houston.)
7	231	Las Vegas Raiders	Nesta Jade Silvera	DT	Arizona State	from New England (Note: No. 231: New England → Las Vegas (PD). See Round 6: Las Vegas → New England.)
7	232	Green Bay Packers	Carrington Valentine	CB	Kentucky	
7	233	Washington Commanders	Andre Jones Jr.	DE	Louisiana	
7	234	Los Angeles Rams	Jason Taylor II	S	Oklahoma State	from Pittsburgh (Note: No. 234: Pittsburgh → LA Rams (PD). Pittsburgh traded a seventh-round selection (234th overall) to the LA Rams in exchange for a seventh-round selection (251st overall) and WR Allen Robinson.)
7	235	Green Bay Packers	Lew Nichols III	RB	Central Michigan	from Detroit via LA Rams (Note: No. 235: Detroit → LA Rams → Green Bay. Multiple trades: Detroit → LA Rams (PD). Detroit traded a seventh-round selection (235th overall) to the LA Rams in exchange for DT Michael Brockers. LA Rams → Green Bay (PD). See Round 6: Green Bay → LA Rams.)
7	236	Indianapolis Colts	Jake Witt	T	Northern Michigan	from Tampa Bay (Note: No. 236: Tampa Bay → Indianapolis (PD). See Round 6: Indianapolis → Tampa Bay.)
7	237	Seattle Seahawks	Kenny McIntosh	RB	Georgia	
7	238	Miami Dolphins	Ryan Hayes	T	Michigan	
7	239	Los Angeles Chargers	Max Duggan	QB	TCU	
7	240	Jacksonville Jaguars	Derek Parish	FB	Houston	from Baltimore via NY Giants (Note: No. 240: Baltimore → NY Giants → Jacksonville. Multiple trades: Baltimore → NY Giants (PD). Baltimore traded a seventh-round selection (240th overall), a 2022 fifth-round selection and G Ben Bredeson to NY Giants in exchange for a 2022 fourth-round selection. NY Giants → Jacksonville See Round 1: Jacksonville → NY Giants.)
7	241	Pittsburgh Steelers	Cory Trice	CB	Purdue	from Minnesota via Denver (Note: No. 241: Minnesota → Denver → Pittsburgh. Multiple trades: Minnesota → Denver (PD). Minnesota traded a seventh-round selection (241st overall) and DE Stephen Weatherly to Denver in exchange for a 2022 seventh-round selection. Denver → Pittsburgh (PD). See Round 6: Pittsburgh → Denver.)
7	242	Green Bay Packers	Anthony Johnson Jr.	S	Iowa State	from Jacksonville (Note: No. 242: Jacksonville → Green Bay (PD). Jacksonville traded a seventh-round selection (242nd overall) to Green Bay in exchange for G Cole Van Lanen.)
7	243	New York Giants	Jordon Riley	DT	Oregon	
7	244	Dallas Cowboys	Jalen Brooks	WR	South Carolina	
7	245	New England Patriots	Isaiah Bolden	CB	Jackson State	from Buffalo via Atlanta (Note: No. 245: Buffalo → Atlanta → New England. Multiple trades: Buffalo → Atlanta (PD). Buffalo traded a seventh-round selection (245th overall) to Atlanta in exchange for S Dean Marlowe. Atlanta → New England (PD). Atlanta traded a seventh-round selection (245th overall) to New England in exchange for TE Jonnu Smith.)
7	246	Cincinnati Bengals	D. J. Ivey	CB	Miami (FL)	
7	247	San Francisco 49ers	Brayden Willis	TE	Oklahoma	
7	248	Houston Texans	Brandon Hill	S	Pittsburgh	from Philadelphia (Note: No. 248: Philadelphia → Houston (D). See Round 6: Houston → Philadelphia.)
7	249	Philadelphia Eagles	Moro Ojomo	DE	Texas	from Kansas City via Detroit (Note: No. 249: Kansas City → Detroit → Philadelphia . Multiple trades: Kansas City → Detroit (D). See Round 2: Detroit → Kansas City. Detroit → Philadelphia (D). See Round 7: Philadelphia → Detroit.)
7*	250	Kansas City Chiefs	Nic Jones	CB	Ball State	
7*	251	Pittsburgh Steelers	Spencer Anderson	G	Maryland	from LA Rams (Note: No. 251: LA Rams → Pittsburgh (PD). See Round 7: Pittsburgh → LA Rams.)
7*	252	Buffalo Bills	Alex Austin	CB	Oregon State	from Tampa Bay via LA Rams (Note: No. 252: Tampa Bay → LA Rams → Buffalo. Multiple trades: Tampa Bay → LA Rams (D). See Round 5: LA Rams → Tampa Bay. LA Rams → Buffalo (D). See Round 6: Buffalo → LA Rams.)
7*	253	San Francisco 49ers	Ronnie Bell	WR	Michigan	
7*	254	New York Giants	Gervarrius Owens	S	Houston	
7*	255	San Francisco 49ers	Jalen Graham	LB	Purdue	
7*	256	Green Bay Packers	Grant DuBose	WR	Charlotte	
7*	257	Denver Broncos	Alex Forsyth	C	Oregon	from New Orleans (Note: No. 257: New Orleans → Denver (D). See Round 6: Denver → New Orleans.)
7^	258	Chicago Bears	Kendall Williamson	CB	Stanford	
7^	259	Los Angeles Rams	Desjuan Johnson	DE	Toledo	from Houston (Note: No. 259: Houston → LA Rams (D). See Round 5: LA Rams → Houston.); Mr. Irrelevant

== Notable undrafted players ==
Original NFL team	Player	Pos.	College	Notes
Arizona Cardinals	Emari Demercado	RB	TCU	
Arizona Cardinals	Blake Whiteheart	TE	Wake Forest	
Atlanta Falcons	Natrone Brooks	CB	Southern Miss	
Baltimore Ravens	Keaton Mitchell	RB	East Carolina	
Buffalo Bills	Tyrell Shavers	WR	San Diego State	
Carolina Panthers	Jalen Redmond	DE	Oklahoma	
Chicago Bears	Tyson Bagent	QB	Shepherd	
Chicago Bears	Andre Szmyt	K	Syracuse	
Cincinnati Bengals	Jacob Saylors	RB	East Tennessee State	
Cleveland Browns	Mohamoud Diabate	LB	Utah	
Cleveland Browns	Ronnie Hickman	S	Ohio State	
Cleveland Browns	Tanner McCalister	S	Ohio State	
Dallas Cowboys	T. J. Bass	G	Oregon	
Dallas Cowboys	Hunter Luepke	FB	North Dakota State	
Denver Broncos	Nate Adkins	TE	South Carolina	
Denver Broncos	Austin Ajiake	LB	UNLV	
Denver Broncos	Henry Byrd	G	Princeton	
Denver Broncos	Art Green	CB	Houston	
Denver Broncos	Thomas Incoom	LB	Central Michigan	
Denver Broncos	Demontrey Jacobs	T	South Florida	
Denver Broncos	Jaleel McLaughlin	RB	Youngstown State	
Denver Broncos	P. J. Mustipher	DT	Penn State	
Denver Broncos	Alex Palczewski	T	Illinois	
Denver Broncos	Emanuel Wilson	RB	Fort Valley State	
Detroit Lions	Trevor Nowaske	LB	Saginaw Valley State	
Detroit Lions	Starling Thomas V	CB	UAB	
Green Bay Packers	Malik Heath	WR	Ole Miss	
Houston Texans	Jake Bates	K	Arkansas	
Kansas City Chiefs	Nikko Remigio	WR	Fresno State	
Kansas City Chiefs	Reese Taylor	CB	Purdue	
Las Vegas Raiders	Drake Thomas	LB	NC State	
Los Angeles Chargers	Andrew Farmer	LB	Lane	
Los Angeles Chargers	A. J. Finley	S	Ole Miss	
Los Angeles Rams	Xavier Smith	WR	Florida A&M	
Los Angeles Rams	Alex Ward	LS	UCF	
Miami Dolphins	Chris Brooks	RB	BYU	
Miami Dolphins	Julian Hill	TE	Campbell	
Miami Dolphins	Keidron Smith	S	Kentucky	
Minnesota Vikings	Ivan Pace Jr.	LB	Cincinnati	
New Orleans Saints	Blake Grupe	K	Notre Dame	
New York Giants	Tommy DeVito	QB	Illinois	
New York Jets	Claudin Cherelus	LB	Alcorn State	
New York Jets	Xavier Gipson	WR	Stephen F. Austin	
Philadelphia Eagles	Eli Ricks	CB	Alabama	
Philadelphia Eagles	Brady Russell	TE	Colorado	
Philadelphia Eagles	Ben VanSumeren	LB	Michigan State	
Seattle Seahawks	Jake Bobo	WR	UCLA	
Seattle Seahawks	Patrick O'Connell	LB	Montana	
Seattle Seahawks	Ty Okada	S	Montana State	
Seattle Seahawks	Chris Stoll	LS	Penn State	
Tampa Bay Buccaneers	Evan Deckers	LS	Duke	
Tampa Bay Buccaneers	Luke Haggard	T	Indiana	
Tampa Bay Buccaneers	Christian Izien	S	Rutgers	
Tampa Bay Buccaneers	Ryan Miller	WR	Furman	
Tampa Bay Buccaneers	Sean Tucker	RB	Syracuse	
Tampa Bay Buccaneers	Markees Watts	LB	Charlotte	
Tennessee Titans	Caleb Murphy	LB	Ferris State	
Tennessee Titans	Otis Reese	LB	Ole Miss	
Washington Commanders	Mitchell Tinsley	WR	Penn State	

== Trades ==
(PD) indicates trades completed prior to the start of the draft (i.e. Pre-Draft), while (D) denotes trades which took place during the 2023 NFL draft.

Round 1

Round 2

Round 3

Round 4

Round 5

Round 6

Round 7

== Resolution JC-2A selections ==
Resolution JC-2A, enacted by the NFL in November 2020, rewards teams for developing minority candidates for head coach and/or general manager positions. The resolution rewards teams whose minority candidates are hired away for one of those positions by awarding draft selections, which are at the end of the third round, after standard compensatory selections; if multiple teams qualify, they are awarded by draft order in the first round. These picks are in addition to, and have no impact on, the standard 32 compensatory selections. Five picks were awarded for the 2023 draft pursuant to the resolution.

== Supplemental draft ==
A supplemental draft was held on July 11, 2023. For each player selected in the supplemental draft, the team forfeits its pick in that round in the draft of the following season. It was the first time the event had taken place since 2019.

Although two players – Milton Wright and Malachi Wideman – were eligible, neither was selected.

== Notes ==
Forfeited selections

== Summary ==
=== Selections by NCAA conference ===
Conference	Round 1	Round 2	Round 3	Round 4	Round 5	Round 6	Round 7	Total
NCAA Division I FBS football conferences
American	0	1	4	1	2	0	2	10
ACC	4	3	5	3	10	3	4	32
Big 12	6	3	4	4	1	7	5	30
Big Ten	9	11	5	7	9	9	5	55
C-USA	0	0	1	0	0	0	2	3
Ind. (FBS)	0	2	0	1	2	2	0	7
MAC	0	0	0	1	0	3	3	7
MW	0	0	0	2	0	3	0	5
Pac-12	3	3	4	3	5	3	6	27
SEC	9	8	14	9	9	6	7	62
Sun Belt	0	0	0	2	2	2	3	9
NCAA Division I FCS football conferences
ASUN	0	0	0	0	0	0	1	1
Big Sky	0	0	1	0	0	0	0	1
CAA	0	0	0	0	1	0	0	1
Ivy	0	0	0	0	0	1	0	1
MVFC	0	1	1	0	0	0	0	2
NEC	0	0	0	0	0	1	0	1
OVC	0	0	0	0	0	0	1	1
SWAC	0	0	0	0	0	0	1	1
WAC	0	0	0	0	1	0	0	1
Non-Division I NCAA football conferences
GLIAC (DII)	0	0	0	0	0	0	1	1
SAC (DII)	0	0	0	0	0	0	1	1

=== Colleges with multiple draft selections ===
Selections	Colleges
10	Alabama, Georgia
9	Michigan
8	TCU
6	Clemson, Florida, LSU, Ohio State, Oregon, Penn State, Pittsburgh
5	Auburn, Maryland, Oklahoma, Purdue, South Carolina, Stanford, Tennessee, Texas
4	Houston, Illinois, Iowa, Kansas State, North Carolina, Northwestern, Ole Miss, UCLA, USC
3	BYU, Cincinnati, Iowa State, Kentucky, Louisville, Miami (FL), Michigan State, Minnesota, Notre Dame, Old Dominion, Texas A&M, Utah, Wisconsin
2	Appalachian State, Arkansas, Boise State, Eastern Michigan, Mississippi State, Nebraska, Oklahoma State, Oregon State, Syracuse, Tulane, Wake Forest

=== Selections by position ===
Position	Round 1	Round 2	Round 3	Round 4	Round 5	Round 6	Round 7	Total
Cornerback	4	5	3	3	5	8	8	36
Wide receiver	4	4	6	3	3	8	5	33
Linebacker	3	3	7	3	8	5	2	31
Defensive end	5	2	4	4	2	1	3	21
Defensive tackle	4	1	4	3	1	4	4	21
Offensive tackle	5	0	2	5	3	2	3	20
Safety	0	2	3	2	5	3	5	20
Running back	2	1	4	1	4	3	3	18
Tight end	1	5	3	0	4	0	2	15
Guard	0	4	0	4	2	0	4	14
Quarterback	3	1	1	3	4	1	1	14
Center	0	3	1	1	1	2	1	9
Kicker	0	0	1	1	0	1	0	3
Punter	0	0	0	0	0	2	1	3
Fullback	0	0	0	0	0	0	1	1

Position	Round 1	Round 2	Round 3	Round 4	Round 5	Round 6	Round 7	Total
Offense	15	18	17	17	21	21	21	130
Defense	16	14	21	15	21	16	20	123
Special teams	0	0	1	1	0	3	1	6
