= Tanner McKee =

American football player (born 2000)

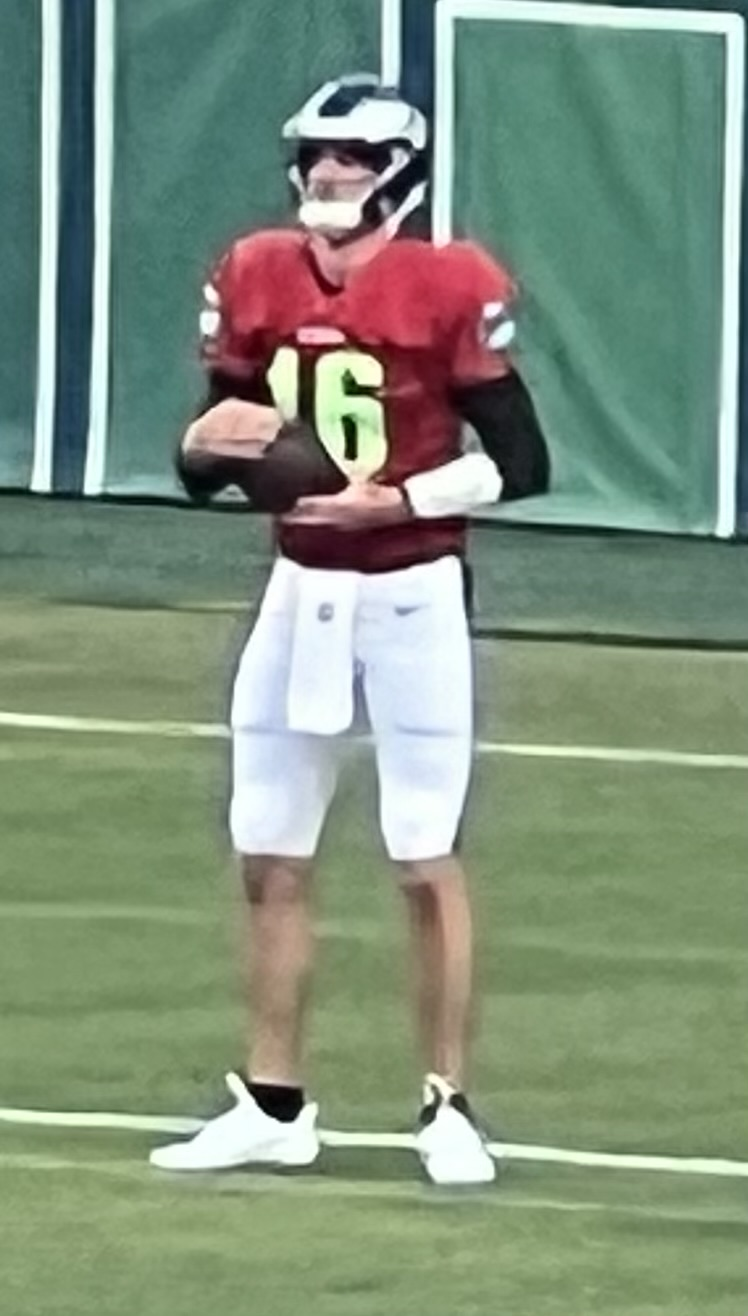
- McKee with the Philadelphia Eagles in 2024

No. 16 – Philadelphia Eagles
- Position: Quarterback
- Roster status: Active

Personal information
- Born: April 27, 2000 (age 26); Irvine, California, U.S.
- Listed height: 6 ft 6 in (1.98 m)
- Listed weight: 231 lb (105 kg)

Career information
- High school: Centennial (Corona, California)
- College: Stanford (2020–2022)
- NFL draft: 2023: 6th round, 188th overall pick

Career history
- Philadelphia Eagles (2023–present)

Awards and highlights
- Super Bowl champion (LIX)

Career NFL statistics as of Week 8, 2026
- Passing attempts: 202
- Passing completions: 126
- Completion percentage: 62.4%
- TD–INT: 7–3
- Passing yards: 1,235
- Passer rating: 84.9
- Stats at Pro Football Reference

Tanner Jeremie McKee (born April 27, 2000) is an American professional football quarterback for the Philadelphia Eagles of the National Football League (NFL). He played college football for the Stanford Cardinal and was selected by the Eagles in the sixth round of the 2023 NFL draft.

== Early life ==
McKee attended Centennial High School in Corona, California. He played in the 2018 U.S. Army All-American Bowl and 2018 Polynesian Bowl, where he was named MVP. McKee committed to Stanford University to play college football.

== College career ==
McKee spent two years in Brazil as a missionary for the Church of Jesus Christ of Latter-day Saints (LDS Church) before playing at Stanford. His first season with the team was 2020, in which he played in one game, completing three passes for 62 yards against the then 12th-ranked Oregon Ducks. McKee competed with Jack West for the starting job in 2021. Although West started during the season opener against the Kansas State Wildcats, McKee still attempted 18 passes, completing 15 of them for 118 yards and a touchdown. He was named the starter for the following week's game against the USC Trojans. In just his 4th collegiate start, McKee led the unranked Cardinal to a miraculous upset victory against the #3 ranked Oregon Ducks, throwing 3 touchdowns and spearheading an 87-yard game-tying drive at the end of the 4th quarter.

=== College statistics ===
Season	Team	Games			Passing								Rushing			
Season	Team	GP	GS	Record	Cmp	Att	Pct	Yds	Avg	TD	Int	Rtg	Att	Yds	Avg	TD
2020	Stanford	1	0	—	3	7	42.9	62	8.9	0	0	117.3	0	0	0.0	0
2021	Stanford	10	9	3–6	206	315	65.4	2,327	7.4	15	7	138.7	61	0	0.0	4
2022	Stanford	12	12	3–9	264	426	62.0	2,947	6.9	13	8	126.4	74	−90	−1.2	2
Career		23	21	6–15	473	748	63.2	5,336	7.1	28	15	131.5	135	-90	-0.6	6

== Professional career ==
Pre-draft measurables
Height	Weight	Arm length	Hand span	Wingspan	20-yard shuttle	Three-cone drill	Vertical jump	Broad jump
6 ft 6 1/4 in (1.99 m)	231 lb (105 kg)	32 7/8 in (0.84 m)	9 3/8 in (0.24 m)	6 ft 7 1/8 in (2.01 m)	4.41 s	7.22 s	33.0 in (0.84 m)	9 ft 6 in (2.90 m)
All values from NFL Combine

McKee was selected by the Philadelphia Eagles in the sixth round, 188th overall, of the 2023 NFL draft. After not playing as a rookie, he made his NFL debut in Week 17 of the 2024 season against the Dallas Cowboys in relief of Kenny Pickett. He completed three passes for 54 yards and two touchdowns in the 41–7 win. McKee was named the starter for Week 18 against the New York Giants after Pickett and Jalen Hurts were declared inactive. With the #2 seed already secured, McKee threw for 269 yards and 2 touchdowns with no turnovers as the Eagles defeated the Giants 20–13, giving McKee his first NFL victory. McKee won a Super Bowl title when the Eagles defeated the Kansas City Chiefs in Super Bowl LIX.

McKee made his first in-game appearance of the 2025 NFL season during the fourth quarter of Philadelphia's Week 15 game against the Las Vegas Raiders, where he completed all three of his passes for 33 yards in the shutout victory. He started Philadelphia's Week 18 contest against the Washington Commanders, completing 21 of 40 passes for 241 yards, one touchdown, and one interception in the 24–17 loss.

After the Eagles acquired Andy Dalton ahead of the 2026 season, McKee was anointed as the third-string quarterback. He returned to the backup role following Dalton's demotion and release in October. When Hurts was indefinitely ruled out due to a blood clot, McKee became the starter beginning Week 6 against the Carolina Panthers. He completed 26 of 45 passes for 215 yards and a touchdown in the 25–14 loss. After losing three straight games, including a 27-10 loss to the Commanders, the Eagles announced that Joe Milton would be the starter in Week 9 against the Giants.

== Career statistics ==
=== NFL ===
Legend
	Won the Super Bowl
**Bold**	Career high

Year	Team	Games			Passing									Rushing					Sacked		Fumbles	
Year	Team	GP	GS	Record	Cmp	Att	Pct	Yds	Y/A	Lng	TD	Int	Rtg	Att	Yds	Y/A	Lng	TD	Sck	SckY	Fum	Lost
2023	PHI	0	0	–	DNP																	
2024	PHI	2	1	**1–0**	30	45	**66.7**	323	**7.2**	25	**4**	0	**117.2**	5	-1	-0.2	2	0	2	17	0	0
2025	PHI	**4**	1	0–1	24	43	55.8	274	6.4	31	1	**1**	73.2	**8**	8	**1.0**	9	0	3	14	0	0
2026	PHI	3	**3**	0–3	**72**	**114**	63.2	**638**	5.2	**34**	2	2	76.6	6	**26**	4.3	**15**	0	**10**	**74**	**1**	**1**
Career		9	5	1-4	126	232	62.4	1,235	6.1	34	7	3	84 9	19	33	1.7	15	0	15	105	1	1

== Personal life ==
He married his wife Lauren, in June 2022. He is a member of the LDS Church. He speaks Portuguese, after spending two years as a full-time missionary for the church in Brazil.
