= Kendall Williamson =

American football player (born 2000)

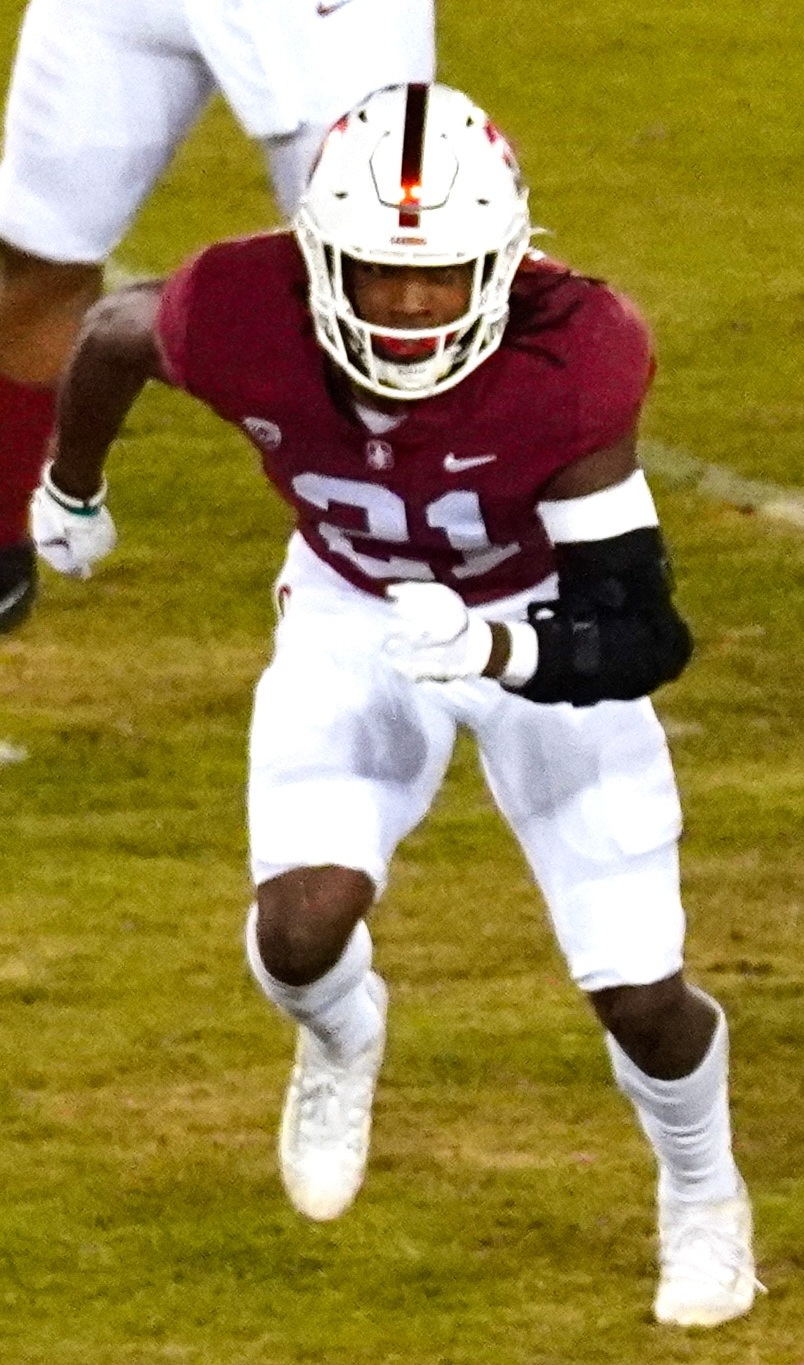
- Williamson with the Stanford Cardinal in 2021

No. 32 – Los Angeles Chargers
- Position: Safety
- Roster status: Active

Personal information
- Born: August 24, 2000 (age 26); Snellville, Georgia, U.S.
- Listed height: 6 ft 0 in (1.83 m)
- Listed weight: 203 lb (92 kg)

Career information
- High school: Brookwood (Snellville)
- College: Stanford (2018–2022)
- NFL draft: 2023: 7th round, 258th overall pick

Career history
- Chicago Bears (2023)*; Buffalo Bills (2024)*; Los Angeles Chargers (2024–present)
- * Offseason or practice squad member only

Career NFL statistics as of Week 5, 2026
- Total tackles: 19
- Stats at Pro Football Reference

Kendall Tyler Williamson (born August 24, 2000) is an American professional football safety for the Los Angeles Chargers of the National Football League (NFL). He played college football for the Stanford Cardinal and was selected in the seventh round of the 2023 NFL draft.

== College career ==
Williamson played five seasons at Stanford, tallying 213 tackles, 11 going for a loss, 1.5 sacks, an interception, 13 pass deflections, a fumble recovery, and two forced fumbles.

== Professional career ==
Pre-draft measurables
Height	Weight	Arm length	Hand span	Wingspan	40-yard dash	10-yard split	20-yard split	20-yard shuttle	Three-cone drill	Vertical jump	Broad jump	Bench press
6 ft 0 3/8 in (1.84 m)	205 lb (93 kg)	32 in (0.81 m)	9 1/2 in (0.24 m)	6 ft 6 1/4 in (1.99 m)	4.49 s	1.59 s	2.60 s	4.38 s	7.01 s	38.5 in (0.98 m)	10 ft 4 in (3.15 m)	17 reps
All values from Pro Day

=== Chicago Bears ===
Williamson was selected by the Chicago Bears with the 258th overall pick in the seventh round in the 2023 NFL draft. He was waived on August 29, 2023, and re-signed to the practice squad. He was not signed to a reserve/future contract after the season and thus became a free agent.

=== Buffalo Bills ===
On January 22, 2024, Williamson signed a reserve/future contract with the Buffalo Bills. He was released as part of final roster cuts on August 27.

=== Los Angeles Chargers ===
On October 30, 2024, Williamson was signed to the Los Angeles Chargers practice squad. He was elevated to the Chargers' active roster for their Week 16 matchup against the Denver Broncos, and made his NFL debut in the contest. He signed a reserve/future contract on January 13, 2025.
