= 2021 Atlantic Coast Conference football season =

2021 ACC Football season
- League: NCAA Division I Football Bowl Subdivision
- Sport: Football
- Duration: September 2, 2021 to December 31, 2021
- Teams: 14

2022 NFL Draft
- Top draft pick: Ikem Ekwonu – (NC State)
- Picked by: Carolina Panthers, 6th overall

Regular season
- Atlantic champions: Wake Forest
- Atlantic runners-up: NC State
- Coastal champions: Pittsburgh
- Coastal runners-up: Miami (FL)

ACC Championship Game
- Champions: Pittsburgh
- Runners-up: Wake Forest
- Finals MVP: Erick Hallett (Pittsburgh)

Seasons
- ← 2020 2022 →

2021 Atlantic Coast Conference football standings
	Conf.			Overall
Team	W		L	W		L
Atlantic Division
No. 15 Wake Forest xy	7	–	1	11	–	3
No. 20 NC State	6	–	2	9	–	3
No. 14 Clemson	6	–	2	10	–	3
Louisville	4	–	4	6	–	7
Florida State	4	–	4	5	–	7
Boston College	2	–	6	6	–	6
Syracuse	2	–	6	5	–	7
Coastal Division
No. 13 Pittsburgh xy$	7	–	1	11	–	3
Miami (FL)	5	–	3	7	–	5
Virginia Tech	4	–	4	6	–	7
Virginia	4	–	4	6	–	6
North Carolina	3	–	5	6	–	7
Georgia Tech	2	–	6	3	–	9
Duke	0	–	8	3	–	9
Championship: Pittsburgh 45, Wake Forest 21
$ – Conference champion; x – Division champion/co-champions; y – Championship game participant; Rankings from AP Poll

The 2021 Atlantic Coast Conference football season, part of the 2021 NCAA Division I FBS football season, was the 69th season of college football play for the Atlantic Coast Conference (ACC). It began on September 2, 2021, and ended on December 31, 2021. The ACC consists of 14 members in two divisions.

== Preseason ==
=== ACC Kickoff ===
The 2021 ACC Kickoff was held on July 21 and 22nd at the Westin hotel in Charlotte, North Carolina. Each team had their head coach and three players available to talk to the media at the event. Coverage of the event was televised on ACC Network. On July 26, 2021, the ACC Preseason Media Poll was released, which projected Clemson to win its 7th consecutive ACC title.

Atlantic
Predicted finish	Team	Votes (1st place)
1	Clemson	1,028 (146)
2	NC State	804 (1)
3	Boston College	638
4	Florida State	510
5	Wake Forest	472
6	Louisville	462
7	Syracuse	202

Coastal
Predicted finish	Team	Votes (1st place)
1	North Carolina	979 (109)
2	Miami	881 (28)
3	Virginia Tech	582 (3)
4	Pittsburgh	576 (1)
5	Virginia	540 (2)
6	Georgia Tech	340 (4)
7	Duke	218

Media poll (ACC Championship)
Rank	Team	Votes
1	Clemson	125
2	North Carolina	16
3	Miami	3
4	Virginia	1
4	Georgia Tech	1
4	NC State	1

==== Preseason ACC Player of the Year ====
Ranking	Player	Position	Team	Votes
1	Sam Howell	QB	North Carolina	114
2	D'Eriq King	QB	Miami	11
3	Bryan Bresee	DE	Clemson	8
4	DJ Uiagalelei	QB	Clemson	6
5	Phil Jurkovec	QB	Boston College	3
6	Zay Flowers	WR	Boston College	2
6	Jahmyr Gibbs	AP	Georgia Tech	2

==== Preseason All-Conference Teams ====
===== Offense =====
Position	Player	School	Votes
Quarterback	Sam Howell	North Carolina	118
Running back	Zonovan Knight	NC State	96
Running back	Mataeo Durant	Duke	49
Wide receiver	Justyn Ross	Clemson	110
Wide receiver	Zay Flowers	Boston College	101
Wide receiver	Jaquarii Roberson	Wake Forest	80
Tight end	James Mitchell	Virginia Tech	77
All-Purpose	Jahmyr Gibbs	Georgia Tech	56
Tackle	Ikem Ekwonu	NC State	83
Tackle	Jordan McFadden	Clemson	53
Guard	Zion Johnson	Boston College	82
Guard	Joshua Ezeudu	North Carolina	56
Center	Alec Lindstrom	Boston College	77

===== Defense =====
Position	Player	School	Votes
Defensive end	Myles Murphy	Clemson	108
Defensive end	Amaré Barno	Virginia Tech	63
Defensive tackle	Bryan Bresee	Clemson	120
Defensive tackle	Tyler Davis	Clemson	53
Linebacker	Payton Wilson	NC State	99
Linebacker	James Skalski	Clemson	95
Linebacker	Nick Jackson	Virginia	37
Cornerback	Andrew Booth Jr.	Clemson	86
Cornerback	Tony Grimes	North Carolina	55
Safety	Bubba Bolden	Miami	100
Safety	Nolan Turner	Clemson	85

===== Specialist =====
Position	Player	School	Votes
Placekicker	Nick Sciba	Wake Forest	69
Punter	Lou Hedley	Miami	84
Specialist	Jahmyr Gibbs	Georgia Tech	60

=== Preseason award watchlists ===
Award	Head coach/player	School	Position	Reference
Lott Trophy	Andrew Booth Jr.	Clemson	CB	
Lott Trophy	Nolan Turner	Clemson	S	
Lott Trophy	Shaka Heyward	Duke	LB	
Lott Trophy	Deslin Alexander	Pittsburgh	DE	
Lott Trophy	Chamarri Conner	Virginia Tech	DB	
Lott Trophy	Nick Jackson	Virginia	LB	
Lott Trophy	Nick Anderson	Wake Forest	LB	
Dodd Trophy	Mack Brown	North Carolina	Head coach	
Dodd Trophy	Dabo Swinney	Clemson	Head coach	
Maxwell Award	Phil Jurkovec	Boston College	QB	
Maxwell Award	Zay Flowers	Boston College	WR	
Maxwell Award	DJ Uiagalelei	Clemson	QB	
Maxwell Award	Justyn Ross	Clemson	WR	
Maxwell Award	Mataeo Durant	Duke	RB	
Maxwell Award	McKenzie Milton	Florida State	QB	
Maxwell Award	Malik Cunningham	Louisville	QB	
Maxwell Award	D'Eriq King	Miami	QB	
Maxwell Award	Zonovan Knight	NC State	RB	
Maxwell Award	Kenny Pickett	Pittsburgh	QB	
Maxwell Award	Brennan Armstrong	Virginia	QB	
Maxwell Award	Jaquarii Roberson	Wake Forest	WR	
Bednarik Award	Bryan Bresee	Clemson	DT	
Bednarik Award	Nolan Turner	Clemson	S	
Bednarik Award	Amari Gainer	Florida State	LB	
Bednarik Award	Bubba Bolden	Miami	S	
Bednarik Award	Payton Wilson	NC State	LB	
Bednarik Award	Jeremiah Gemmel	North Carolina	LB	
Bednarik Award	Calijah Kancey	Pittsburgh	DT	
Davey O'Brien Award	Malik Cunningham	Louisville	QB	
Davey O'Brien Award	Sam Howell	North Carolina	QB	
Davey O'Brien Award	Phil Jurkovec	Boston College	QB	
Davey O'Brien Award	D'Eriq King	Miami	QB	
Davey O'Brien Award	McKenzie Milton	Florida State	QB	
Davey O'Brien Award	DJ Uiagalelei	Clemson	QB	
Doak Walker Award	Christian Beal-Smith	Wake Forest	RB	
Doak Walker Award	Ty Chandler	North Carolina	RB	
Doak Walker Award	Jashaun Corbin	Florida State	RB	
Doak Walker Award	Lawrance Toafili	Florida State	RB	
Doak Walker Award	Lyn-J Dixon	Clemson	RB	
Doak Walker Award	Mataeo Durant	Duke	RB	
Doak Walker Award	Jahmyr Gibbs	Georgia Tech	RB	
Doak Walker Award	Jordan Mason	Georgia Tech	RB	
Doak Walker Award	Zonovan Knight	NC State	RB	
Doak Walker Award	Jalen Mitchell	Louisville	RB	
Doak Walker Award	Sean Tucker	Syracuse	RB	
Fred Biletnikoff Award	Jordan Addison	Pittsburgh	WR	
Fred Biletnikoff Award	Emeka Emezie	NC State	WR	
Fred Biletnikoff Award	Zay Flowers	Boston College	WR	
Fred Biletnikoff Award	Mike Harley	Miami	WR	
Fred Biletnikoff Award	Taj Harris	Syracuse	WR	
Fred Biletnikoff Award	Billy Kemp IV	Virginia	WR	
Fred Biletnikoff Award	Jaquarii Roberson	Wake Forest	WR	
Fred Biletnikoff Award	Justyn Ross	Clemson	WR	

Award	Head coach/player	School	Position	Reference
John Mackey Award	James Mitchell	Virginia Tech	TE	
John Mackey Award	Will Mallory	Miami (FL)	TE	
John Mackey Award	Garrett Walston	North Carolina	TE	
John Mackey Award	Braden Galloway	Clemson	TE	
John Mackey Award	Brandon Chapman	Wake Forest	TE	
John Mackey Award	Camren McDonald	Florida State	TE	
John Mackey Award	Lucas Krull	Pittsburgh	TE	
John Mackey Award	Jelani Woods	Virginia	TE	
Rimington Trophy	Alec Lindstrom	Boston College	OL	
Rimington Trophy	Jack Wohlabaugh	Duke	OL	
Rimington Trophy	Cole Bentley	Louisville	OL	
Rimington Trophy	Grant Gibson	NC State	OL	
Rimington Trophy	Olusegun Oluwatimi	Virginia	OL	
Butkus Award	James Skalski	Clemson	LB	
Butkus Award	Baylon Spector	Clemson	LB	
Butkus Award	Amari Gainer	Florida State	LB	
Butkus Award	Jeremiah Gemmel	North Carolina	LB	
Butkus Award	Payton Wilson	NC State	LB	
Butkus Award	Mikel Jones	Syracuse	LB	
Butkus Award	Nick Jackson	Virginia	LB	
Outland Trophy	Bryan Bresee	Clemson	DE	
Outland Trophy	Tyler Davis	Clemson	DT	
Outland Trophy	Jordan McFadden	Clemson	OT	
Outland Trophy	Ikem Ekwonu	NC State	G	
Outland Trophy	Grant Gibson	NC State	G	
Outland Trophy	Joshua Ezeudu	North Carolina	G	
Outland Trophy	Brock Hoffman	Virginia Tech	C	
Outland Trophy	Zion Johnson	Boston College	G	
Outland Trophy	Tyler Vrabel	Boston College	OT	
Outland Trophy	Alec Lindstrom	Boston College	C	
Outland Trophy	Zion Nelson	Miami (FL)	OT	
Outland Trophy	Jarrid Williams	Miami (FL)	OT	
Outland Trophy	Zach Tom	Wake Forest	OT	
Outland Trophy	Raymond Vohasek	North Carolina	DT	
Bronko Nagurski Trophy	Bubba Bolden	Miami (FL)	S	
Bronko Nagurski Trophy	Bryan Bresee	Clemson	DT	
Bronko Nagurski Trophy	Myles Murphy	Clemson	DE	
Bronko Nagurski Trophy	James Skalski	Clemson	LB	
Bronko Nagurski Trophy	Nolan Turner	Clemson	S	
Bronko Nagurski Trophy	Calijah Kancey	Pittsburgh	DT	
Bronko Nagurski Trophy	Raymond Vohasek	North Carolina	LB	
Bronko Nagurski Trophy	Payton Wilson	NC State	LB	
Lou Groza Award	Christoper Dunn	NC State	PK	
Lou Groza Award	Charlie Ham	Duke	PK	
Lou Groza Award	B. T. Potter	Clemson	PK	
Lou Groza Award	Nick Sciba	Wake Forest	PK	
Lou Groza Award	Andre Szmyt	Syracuse	PK	
Lou Groza Award	James Turner	Louisville	PK	

Award	Head coach/player	School	Position	Reference
Paul Hornung Award	Jahmyr Gibbs	Georgia Tech	RB	
Paul Hornung Award	Donavon Greene	Wake Forest	WR	
Paul Hornung Award	Zonovan Knight	NC State	RB	
Paul Hornung Award	Jaylan Knighton	Miami (FL)	RB	
Wuerffel Trophy	Darien Rencher	Clemson	RB	
Wuerffel Trophy	Jake Bobo	Duke	WR	
Wuerffel Trophy	Camren McDonald	Florida State	TE	
Wuerffel Trophy	Juanyeh Thomas	Georgia Tech	DB	
Wuerffel Trophy	Isaiah Moore	NC State	LB	
Wuerffel Trophy	Kingsley Jonathan	Syracuse	DL	
Wuerffel Trophy	Cal Adomitis	Pittsburgh	LS	
Wuerffel Trophy	Deslin Alexandre	Pittsburgh	DL	
Wuerffel Trophy	Brock Hoffman	Virginia Tech	OL	
Wuerffel Trophy	Tyriq Hardimon	Wake Forest	DB	
Walter Camp Award	Bryan Bresee	Clemson	DT	
Walter Camp Award	Justyn Ross	Clemson	WR	
Walter Camp Award	Sam Howell	North Carolina	QB	
Walter Camp Award	D'Eriq King	Miami (FL)	QB	
Manning Award	Malik Cunningham	Louisville	QB	
Manning Award	Sam Howell	North Carolina	QB	
Manning Award	Phil Jurkovec	Boston College	QB	
Manning Award	D'Eriq King	Miami (FL)	QB	
Manning Award	Kenny Pickett	Pittsburgh	QB	
Earl Campbell Tyler Rose Award	D'Eriq King	Miami (FL)	QB	
Earl Campbell Tyler Rose Award	Beau Corrales	North Carolina	WR	
Ray Guy Award	Ben Kiernan	North Carolina	P	
Ray Guy Award	Ivan Mora	Wake Forest	P	
Ray Guy Award	Kirk Christodoulou	Pittsburgh	P	
Ray Guy Award	Lou Hedley	Miami (FL)	P	
Ray Guy Award	Porter Wilson	Duke	P	
Ray Guy Award	Trenton Gill	NC State	P	
Ray Guy Award	Will Spiers	Clemson	P	
Polynesian College Football Player Of The Year Award	Lawrance Toafili	Florida State	RB	
Polynesian College Football Player Of The Year Award	DJ Uiagalelei	Clemson	QB	
Johnny Unitas Golden Arm Award	Brennan Armstrong	Virginia	QB	
Johnny Unitas Golden Arm Award	Braxton Burmeister	Virginia Tech	QB	
Johnny Unitas Golden Arm Award	Malik Cunningham	Louisville	QB	
Johnny Unitas Golden Arm Award	Tommy DeVito	Syracuse	QB	
Johnny Unitas Golden Arm Award	Sam Hartman	Wake Forest	QB	
Johnny Unitas Golden Arm Award	Sam Howell	North Carolina	QB	
Johnny Unitas Golden Arm Award	Phil Jurkovec	Boston College	QB	
Johnny Unitas Golden Arm Award	D'Eriq King	Miami (FL)	QB	
Johnny Unitas Golden Arm Award	Devin Leary	NC State	QB	
Johnny Unitas Golden Arm Award	McKenzie Milton	Florida State	QB	
Johnny Unitas Golden Arm Award	Kenny Pickett	Pittsburgh	QB	

=== Recruiting classes ===
Rankings
Team	ESPN	Rivals	24/7	Signees
Boston College	38	32	37	29
Clemson	4	7	5	19
Duke		60	57	18
Florida State	19	30	23	24
Georgia Tech	34	48	47	23
Louisville	30	29	39	24
Miami	9	10	11	21
North Carolina	7	16	14	19
NC State	31	45	35	20
Pittsburgh	33	21	27	23
Syracuse		51	56	22
Virginia	32	31	32	24
Virginia Tech		43	45	27
Wake Forest		66	65	19

== Coaches ==
=== Coaching changes ===
There are no coaching changes for the 2021 season.

=== Head coaching records ===
Team	Head coach	Years at school	Overall record	Record at school	ACC record
Boston College	Jeff Hafley	2	12–11	12–11	7–11
Clemson	Dabo Swinney	13	150–36	150–36	91–19
Duke	David Cutcliffe	14	121–126	77–98	35–80
Florida State	Mike Norvell	2	46–28	8–13	6–10
Georgia Tech	Geoff Collins	3	24–35	9–25	7–18
Louisville	Scott Satterfield	3	69–43	18–19	12–13
Miami	Manny Diaz	3	21–15	21–15	16–9
North Carolina	Mack Brown	13	265–139–1	90–63–1	55–47–1
North Carolina State	Dave Doeren	9	87–53	64–49	34–40
Pittsburgh	Pat Narduzzi	7	52–37	52–37	36–22
Syracuse	Dino Babers	6	66–59	29–43	15–35
Virginia	Bronco Mendenhall	6	135–81	36–38	22–27
Virginia Tech	Justin Fuente	6	69–54	43–31	28–21
Wake Forest	Dave Clawson	8	141–127	51–48	26–39

Notes

- Records shown after the 2021 season
- Years at school includes the 2021 season

== Rankings ==
Legend
	Improvement in ranking
	Drop in ranking
	Not ranked previous week
RV	Received votes but were not ranked in Top 25 of poll

		Pre	Wk 1	Wk 2	Wk 3	Wk 4	Wk 5	Wk 6	Wk 7	Wk 8	Wk 9	Wk 10	Wk 11	Wk 12	Wk 13	Wk 14	Final
Boston College	AP	RV	RV	RV	RV	RV	RV	RV									
Boston College	C	RV	RV	RV	RV	RV	RV	RV									
Boston College	CFP	Not released															
Clemson	AP	3 (6)	6	6	9	25	RV	RV	RV					RV	22	19	14
Clemson	C	2	6	6	7	19	21	25	24		RV	RV	RV	RV	24	22	16
Clemson	CFP	Not released												23	20	19	
Duke	AP																
Duke	C																
Duke	CFP	Not released															
Florida State	AP		RV														
Florida State	C	RV	RV														
Florida State	CFP	Not released															
Georgia Tech	AP																
Georgia Tech	C																
Georgia Tech	CFP	Not released															
Louisville	AP				RV	RV											
Louisville	C					RV							RV				
Louisville	CFP	Not released															
Miami	AP	14	22	24													
Miami	C	16	24	RV	RV												
Miami	CFP	Not released															
North Carolina	AP	10	24	21	21	RV											
North Carolina	C	9	22	19	20	RV	RV										
North Carolina	CFP	Not released															
NC State	AP	RV	RV			23	23	22	18	RV	RV	21	25	24	21	18	20
NC State	C	RV	RV	RV		RV	22	21	18	25	22	19	24	24	20	18	19
NC State	CFP	Not released									19	16	20	20	18	18	
Pittsburgh	AP			RV			RV	RV	23	17	RV	25	20	20	17	13	13
Pittsburgh	C	RV	RV	RV			RV	RV	23	19	25	22	19	17	15	12	13
Pittsburgh	CFP	Not released									25	21	18	17	15	12	
Syracuse	AP																
Syracuse	C																
Syracuse	CFP	Not released															
Virginia	AP									RV							
Virginia	C		RV	RV						RV							
Virginia	CFP	Not released															
Virginia Tech	AP		19	15	RV	RV	RV										
Virginia Tech	C	RV	21	15	RV	RV	RV										
Virginia Tech	CFP	Not released															
Wake Forest	AP				RV	24	19	16	16	13	10	13	13	21	18	20	15
Wake Forest	C				RV	25	20	16	15	13	9	13	12	21	18	19	14
Wake Forest	CFP	Not released									9	12	10	18	16	17	

== Schedule ==
The regular season will begin on September 2 and will end on November 27. The ACC Championship game is scheduled for December 4, 2021.

=== Regular season ===
==== Week one ====
Date	Time	Visiting team	Home team	Site	TV	Result	Attendance	Ref.
September 2	7:30 p.m.	South Florida	NC State	Carter–Finley Stadium • Raleigh, NC	ACCN	W 45–0	52,633	
September 3	6:00 p.m.	No. 10 North Carolina	Virginia Tech	Lane Stadium • Blacksburg, VA	ESPN	VT 17–10	65,632	
September 3	7:00 p.m.	Duke	Charlotte	Jerry Richardson Stadium • Charlotte, NC	CBSSN	L 28–31	14,125	
September 3	7:00 p.m.	Old Dominion	Wake Forest	Truist Field at Wake Forest • Winston-Salem, NC	ACCN	W 42–10	25,673	
September 4	Noon	Colgate	Boston College	Alumni Stadium • Chestnut Hill, MA	ACCN	W 51–0	28,991	
September 4	3:30 p.m.	No. 1 Alabama	No. 14 Miami	Mercedes-Benz Stadium • Atlanta, GA (Chick-fil-A Kickoff Game)	ABC	L 13–44	71,829	
September 4	4:00 p.m.	UMass	Pittsburgh	Heinz Field • Pittsburgh, PA	ACCN	W 51–7	41,486	
September 4	7:00 p.m.	Syracuse	Ohio	Peden Stadium • Athens, OH	CBSSN	W 29–9	23,904	
September 4	7:30 p.m.	No. 5 Georgia	No. 3 Clemson	Bank of America Stadium • Charlotte, NC (Duke's Mayo Classic, rivalry, College GameDay)	ABC	L 3–10	74,187	
September 4	7:30 p.m.	Northern Illinois	Georgia Tech	Bobby Dodd Stadium • Atlanta, GA	ACCN	L 21–22	33,651	
September 4	7:30 p.m.	William & Mary	Virginia	Scott Stadium • Charlottesville, VA	ACCRSN	W 43–0	42,982	
September 5	7:30 p.m.	No. 9 Notre Dame	Florida State	Doak Campbell Stadium • Tallahassee, FL	ABC	L 38–41 ^{OT}	68,316	
September 6	8:00 p.m.	Louisville	Ole Miss	Mercedes-Benz Stadium • Atlanta, GA (Chick-fil-A Kickoff Game)	ESPN	L 24–43	30,709	
^{#}Rankings from AP Poll released prior to game. All times are in Eastern Time.

==== Week two ====
Date	Time	Visiting team	Home team	Site	TV	Result	Attendance	Ref.
September 10	8:00 p.m.	North Carolina A&T	Duke	Wallace Wade Stadium • Durham, NC	ACCN	W 45–17	18,091	
September 11	11:00 a.m.	Illinois	Virginia	Scott Stadium • Charlottesville, VA	ACCN	W 42–14	36,036	
September 11	Noon	No. 22 (FCS) Kennesaw State	Georgia Tech	Bobby Dodd Stadium • Atlanta, GA	ACCRSN	W 45–17	35,195	
September 11	Noon	Norfolk State	Wake Forest	Truist Stadium at Wake Forest • Winston-Salem, NC	ACCNX	W 41–16	21,896	
September 11	Noon	Pittsburgh	Tennessee	Volunteer Stadium • Knoxville, TN	ESPN	W 41–34	82,203	
September 11	2:00 p.m.	Middle Tennessee	No. 19 Virginia Tech	Lane Stadium • Blacksburg, VA	ACCNX	W 35–14	53,680	
September 11	2:00 p.m.	Rutgers	Syracuse	Carrier Dome • Syracuse, NY	ACCN	L 7–17	31,941	
September 11	3:30 p.m.	Boston College	UMass	Warren McGuirk Alumni Stadium • Hadley, MA (rivalry)	FloSports	W 45–28	12,118	
September 11	5:00 p.m.	South Carolina State	No. 6 Clemson	Memorial Stadium • Clemson, SC	ACCN	W 49–3	78,609	
September 11	7:00 p.m.	Appalachian State	No. 22 Miami	Hard Rock Stadium • Miami Gardens, FL	ESPNU	W 25–23	45,877	
September 11	7:00 p.m.	Eastern Kentucky	Louisville	Cardinal Stadium • Louisville, KY	ACCNX	W 30–3	39,673	
September 11	7:00 p.m.	NC State	Mississippi State	Davis Wade Stadium • Starkville, MS	ESPN2	L 10–24	45,834	
September 11	7:30 p.m.	Georgia State	No. 24 North Carolina	Kenan Stadium • Chapel Hill, NC	ACCRSN	W 59–17	50,500	
September 11	8:00 p.m.	No. 16 (FCS) Jacksonville State	Florida State	Doak Campbell Stadium • Tallahassee, FL	ACCN	L 17–20	60,198	
^{#}Rankings from AP Poll released prior to game. All times are in Eastern Time.

==== Week three ====
Date	Time	Visiting team	Home team	Site	TV	Result	Attendance	Ref.
September 17	7:30 p.m.	UCF	Louisville	Cardinal Stadium • Louisville, KY	ESPN	W 42–35	39,022	
September 18	Noon	Albany	Syracuse	Carrier Dome • Syracuse, NY	ACCN	W 62–24	30,156	
September 18	Noon	Boston College	Temple	Lincoln Financial Field • Philadelphia, PA	ESPNU	W 28–3	25,290	
September 18	Noon	Michigan State	No. 24 Miami	Hard Rock Stadium • Miami Gardens, FL	ABC	L 17–38	46,427	
September 18	Noon	No. 15 Virginia Tech	West Virginia	Milan Puskar Stadium • Morgantown, WV (rivalry)	FS1	L 21–27	60,022	
September 18	Noon	Western Michigan	Pittsburgh	Heinz Field • Pittsburgh, PA	ACCRSN	L 41–44	40,581	
September 18	3:30 p.m.	Florida State	Wake Forest	Truist Field at Wake Forest • Winston-Salem, NC	ESPN	WAKE 35–14	29,564	
September 18	3:30 p.m.	Georgia Tech	No. 6 Clemson	Memorial Stadium • Clemson, SC (rivalry)	ABC	CLEM 14–8	81,500	
September 18	4:00 p.m.	Northwestern	Duke	Wallace Wade Stadium • Durham, NC	ACCN	W 30–23	12,323	
September 18	7:30 p.m.	Furman	NC State	Carter–Finley Stadium • Raleigh, NC	ACCRSN	W 45–7	56,919	
September 18	7:30 p.m.	Virginia	No. 21 North Carolina	Kenan Stadium • Chapel Hill, NC (South's Oldest Rivalry)	ACCN	UNC 59–39	50,500	
^{#}Rankings from AP Poll released prior to game. All times are in Eastern Time.

==== Week four ====
Date	Time	Visiting team	Home team	Site	TV	Result	Attendance	Ref.
September 24	7:00 p.m.	Wake Forest	Virginia	Scott Stadium • Charlottesville, VA	ESPN2	WAKE 37–17	38,699	
September 24	8:00 p.m.	Liberty	Syracuse	Carrier Dome • Syracuse, NY	ACCN	W 24–21	29,942	
September 25	Noon	Missouri	Boston College	Alumni Stadium • Chestnut Hill, MA	ESPN2	W 41–34 ^{OT}	44,500	
September 25	Noon	No. 24 (FCS) Richmond	Virginia Tech	Lane Stadium • Blacksburg, VA	ACCN	W 21–10	53,174	
September 25	Noon	No. 21 (FCS) New Hampshire	Pittsburgh	Heinz Field • Pittsburgh, PA	ACCNX/ESPN+	W 77–7	41,048	
September 25	12:30 p.m.	Central Connecticut	Miami	Hard Rock Stadium • Miami Gardens, FL	ACCRSN	W 69–0	44,019	
September 25	3:30 p.m.	No. 9 Clemson	NC State	Carter–Finley Stadium • Raleigh, NC (Textile Bowl)	ESPN	NCSU 27–21 ^{2OT}	56,919	
September 25	3:30 p.m.	Louisville	Florida State	Doak Campbell Stadium • Tallahassee, FL	ESPN2	LOU 31–23	50,964	
September 25	4:00 p.m.	Kansas	Duke	Wallace Wade Stadium • Durham, NC	ACCN	W 52–33	19,128	
September 25	7:30 p.m.	No. 20 North Carolina	Georgia Tech	Mercedes-Benz Stadium • Atlanta, GA	ACCN	GT 45–22	37,450	
^{#}Rankings from AP Poll released prior to game. All times are in Eastern Time.

==== Week five ====
Date	Time	Visiting team	Home team	Site	TV	Result	Attendance	Ref.
September 30	7:30 p.m.	Virginia	Miami	Hard Rock Stadium • Miami Gardens, FL	ESPN	UVA 30–28	37,269	
October 2	Noon	Duke	North Carolina	Kenan Stadium • Chapel Hill, NC (Victory Bell)	ESPN2	UNC 38–7	45,812	
October 2	Noon	Pittsburgh	Georgia Tech	Bobby Dodd Stadium • Atlanta, GA	ACCN	PITT 52–21	36,383	
October 2	12:30 p.m.	Louisville	No. 24 Wake Forest	Truist Field at Wake Forest • Winston-Salem, NC	ACCRSN	WAKE 37–34	29,077	
October 2	3:30 p.m.	Syracuse	Florida State	Doak Campbell Stadium • Tallahassee, FL	ACCN	FSU 33–30	56,609	
October 2	6:00 p.m.	Louisiana Tech	No. 23 NC State	Carter–Finley Stadium • Raleigh, NC	ACCNX/ESPN+	W 34–27	51,064	
October 2	7:30 p.m.	Boston College	No. 25 Clemson	Memorial Stadium • Clemson, SC (O'Rourke–McFadden Trophy)	ACCN	CLEM 19–13	79,159	
^{#}Rankings from AP Poll released prior to game. All times are in Eastern Time.

Date	Bye Week
October 2	Virginia Tech

==== Week six ====
Date	Time	Visiting team	Home team	Site	TV	Result	Attendance	Ref.
October 9	12:30 p.m.	Georgia Tech	Duke	Wallace Wade Stadium • Durham, NC	ACCRSN	GT 31–27	11,849	
October 9	3:00 p.m.	Virginia	Louisville	Cardinal Stadium • Louisville, KY	ACCN	UVA 34–33	40,320	
October 9	3:30 p.m.	No. 19 Wake Forest	Syracuse	Carrier Dome • Syracuse, NY	ESPN2	WAKE 40–37 ^{OT}	38,554	
October 9	3:30 p.m.	Florida State	North Carolina	Kenan Stadium • Chapel Hill, NC	ESPN	FSU 35–25	44,805	
October 9	7:30 p.m.	No. 14 Notre Dame	Virginia Tech	Lane Stadium • Blacksburg, VA	ACCN	L 29–32	65,632	
^{#}Rankings from AP Poll released prior to game. All times are in Eastern Time.

Date	Bye Week				
October 9	Boston College	Clemson	Miami	No. 23 NC State	Pittsburgh

==== Week seven ====
Date	Time	Visiting team	Home team	Site	TV	Result	Attendance	Ref.
October 15	7:00 p.m.	Clemson	Syracuse	Carrier Dome • Syracuse, NY	ESPN	CLEM 17–14	36,670	
October 16	12:30 p.m.	Duke	Virginia	Scott Stadium • Charlottesville, VA	ACCRSN	UVA 48–0	38,489	
October 16	3:30 p.m.	Miami	North Carolina	Kenan Stadium • Chapel Hill, NC	ACCN	UNC 45–42	50,500	
October 16	3:30 p.m.	Pittsburgh	Virginia Tech	Lane Stadium • Blacksburg, VA	ESPN2	PITT 28–7	58,314	
October 16	7:30 p.m.	No. 22 NC State	Boston College	Alumni Stadium • Chestnut Hill, MA	ACCN	NCSU 33–7	40,349	
^{#}Rankings from AP Poll released prior to game. All times are in Eastern Time.

Date	Bye Week			
October 16	Florida State	Georgia Tech	Louisville	No. 16 Wake Forest

==== Week eight ====
Date	Time	Visiting team	Home team	Site	TV	Result	Attendance	Ref.
October 23	Noon	No. 16 Wake Forest	Army	Michie Stadium • West Point, NY	CBSSN	W 70–56	38,019	
October 23	Noon	UMass	Florida State	Doak Campbell Stadium • Tallahassee, FL	ACCN	W 59–3	51,915	
October 23	12:30 p.m.	Syracuse	Virginia Tech	Lane Stadium • Blacksburg, VA	ACCRSN	SYR 41–36	57,941	
October 23	3:30 p.m.	Clemson	No. 23 Pittsburgh	Heinz Field • Pittsburgh, PA	ESPN	PITT 27–17	60,594	
October 23	4:00 p.m.	Boston College	Louisville	Cardinal Stadium • Louisville, KY	ACCN	LOU 28–14	38,202	
October 23	7:30 p.m.	Georgia Tech	Virginia	Scott Stadium • Charlottesville, VA	ACCN	UVA 48–40	45,837	
October 23	7:30 p.m.	No. 18 NC State	Miami	Hard Rock Stadium • Miami Gardens, FL	ESPN2	MIA 31–30	43,293	
^{#}Rankings from AP Poll released prior to game. All times are in Eastern Time.

Date	Bye Week	
October 23	Duke	North Carolina

==== Week nine ====
Date	Time	Visiting team	Home team	Site	TV	Result	Attendance	Ref.
October 30	Noon	Miami	No. 17 Pittsburgh	Heinz Field • Pittsburgh, PA	ACCN	MIA 38–34	46,977	
October 30	Noon	Virginia Tech	Georgia Tech	Bobby Dodd Stadium • Atlanta, GA (rivalry)	ACCRSN	VT 26–17	35,543	
October 30	3:30 p.m.	Florida State	Clemson	Memorial Stadium • Clemson, SC (rivalry)	ESPN	CLEM 30–20	79,097	
October 30	3:30 p.m.	Boston College	Syracuse	Carrier Dome • Syracuse, NY (rivalry)	ACCRSN	SYR 21–6	32,022	
October 30	4:00 p.m.	Duke	No. 13 Wake Forest	Truist Field at Wake Forest • Winston-Salem, NC	ACCN	WAKE 45–7	31,613	
October 30	7:30 p.m.	Louisville	NC State	Carter–Finley Stadium • Raleigh, NC	ACCN	NCSU 28–13	53,123	
October 30	7:30 p.m.	North Carolina	No. 11 Notre Dame	Notre Dame Stadium • South Bend, IN	NBC	L 34–44	71,018	
October 30	10:15 p.m.	Virginia	No. 25 BYU	LaVell Edwards Stadium • Provo, UT	ESPN2	L 49–66	57,685	
^{#}Rankings from AP Poll released prior to game. All times are in Eastern Time.

==== Week ten ====
Date	Time	Visiting team	Home team	Site	TV	Result	Attendance	Ref.
November 5	7:30 p.m.	Virginia Tech	Boston College	Alumni Stadium • Chestnut Hill, MA (rivalry)	ESPN2	BC 17–3	35,637	
November 6	Noon	No. 25 Pittsburgh	Duke	Wallace Wade Stadium • Durham, NC	ACCN	PITT 54–29	20,693	
November 6	Noon	No. 9 Wake Forest	North Carolina	Kenan Stadium • Chapel Hill, NC (rivalry)	ABC	UNC 58–55	50,500	
November 6	12:30 p.m.	Georgia Tech	Miami	Hard Rock Stadium • Miami Gardens, FL	ACCRSN	MIA 33–30	48,161	
November 6	4:00 p.m.	No. 19 NC State	Florida State	Doak Campbell Stadium • Tallahassee, FL	ACCN	NCSU 28–14	50,835	
November 6	7:30 p.m.	Clemson	Louisville	Cardinal Stadium • Louisville, KY	ACCN	CLEM 30–24	51,729	
^{#}Rankings from College Football Playoff. All times are in Eastern Time.

^note 1The game between North Carolina and Wake Forest is being played as a non-conference game and will therefore not count in the conference standings.

Date	Bye Week	
November 6	Syracuse	Virginia

==== Week eleven ====
Date	Time	Visiting team	Home team	Site	TV	Result	Attendance	Ref.
November 11	7:30 p.m.	North Carolina	No. 21 Pittsburgh	Heinz Field • Pittsburgh, PA	ESPN	PITT 30–23 ^{OT}	41,687	
November 13	Noon	UConn	Clemson	Memorial Stadium • Clemson, SC	ACCN	W 44–7	77,522	
November 13	Noon	Syracuse	Louisville	Cardinal Stadium • Louisville, KY	ACCRSN	LOU 41–3	43,797	
November 13	3:30 p.m.	Boston College	Georgia Tech	Bobby Dodd Stadium • Atlanta, GA	ACCRSN	BC 41–30	31,511	
November 13	3:30 p.m.	Duke	Virginia Tech	Lane Stadium • Blacksburg, VA	ACCN	VT 48–17	56,730	
November 13	3:30 p.m.	Miami	Florida State	Doak Campbell Stadium • Tallahassee, FL (rivalry)	ESPN	FSU 31–28	71,917	
November 13	7:30 p.m.	No. 16 NC State	No. 12 Wake Forest	Truist Field at Wake Forest • Winston-Salem, NC (rivalry)	ACCN	WAKE 45–42	34,503	
November 13	7:30 p.m.	No. 9 Notre Dame	Virginia	Scott Stadium • Charlottesville, VA	ABC	L 3–28	48,584	
^{#}Rankings from College Football Playoff. All times are in Eastern Time.

==== Week twelve ====
Date	Time	Visiting team	Home team	Site	TV	Result	Attendance	Ref.
November 18	7:30 p.m.	Louisville	Duke	Wallace Wade Stadium • Durham, NC	ESPN	LOU 62–22	8,493	
November 20	Noon	Wofford	North Carolina	Kenan Stadium • Chapel Hill, NC	ACCRSN	W 34–14	43,011	
November 20	Noon	Florida State	Boston College	Alumni Stadium • Chestnut Hill, MA	ACCN	FSU 26–23	33,363	
November 20	Noon	No. 10 Wake Forest	Clemson	Memorial Stadium • Clemson, SC	ESPN	CLEM 48–27	81,048	
November 20	2:30 p.m.	Georgia Tech	No. 8 Notre Dame	Notre Dame Stadium • South Bend, IN	NBC	L 0–55	70,011	
November 20	3:30 p.m.	Virginia	No. 18 Pittsburgh	Heinz Field • Pittsburgh, PA	ESPN2	PITT 48–38	45,183	
November 20	4:00 p.m.	Syracuse	No. 20 NC State	Carter–Finley Stadium • Raleigh, NC	ACCN	NCSU 41–17	54,083	
November 20	7:30 p.m.	Virginia Tech	Miami	Hard Rock Stadium • Miami Gardens, FL (rivalry)	ACCN	MIA 38–26	40,839	
^{#}Rankings from College Football Playoff. All times are in Eastern Time.

==== Week thirteen ====
Date	Time	Visiting team	Home team	Site	TV	Result	Attendance	Ref.
November 26	7:00 p.m.	North Carolina	No. 20 NC State	Carter–Finley Stadium • Raleigh, NC (rivalry)	ESPN	NCSU 34–30	56,919	
November 27	Noon	No. 1 Georgia	Georgia Tech	Bobby Dodd Stadium • Atlanta, GA (Clean, Old-Fashioned Hate)	ABC	L 0–45	52,806	
November 27	Noon	No. 18 Wake Forest	Boston College	Alumni Stadium • Chestnut Hill, MA	ESPN2	WAKE 41–10	25,854	
November 27	Noon	Florida State	Florida	Ben Hill Griffin Stadium • Gainesville, FL (rivalry)	ESPN	L 21–24	88,491	
November 27	12:30 p.m.	Miami	Duke	Wallace Wade Stadium • Durham, NC	ACCRSN	MIA 47–10	17,391	
November 27	3:45 p.m.	Virginia Tech	Virginia	Scott Stadium • Charlottesville, VA (Commonwealth Cup)	ACCN	VT 29–24	46,445	
November 27	7:30 p.m.	Kentucky	Louisville	Cardinal Stadium • Louisville, KY (Governor's Cup)	ESPN2	L 21–52	55,018	
November 27	7:30 p.m.	No. 17 Pittsburgh	Syracuse	Carrier Dome • Syracuse, NY (rivalry)	ACCN	PITT 31–14	27,939	
November 27	7:30 p.m.	No. 23 Clemson	South Carolina	Williams–Brice Stadium • Columbia, SC (rivalry)	SECN	W 30–0	79,897	
^{#}Rankings from College Football Playoff. All times are in Eastern Time.

=== Championship game ===
Date	Time	Visiting team	Home team	Site	TV	Result	Attendance	Ref.
December 4	8:00 p.m.	No. 15 Pittsburgh	No. 16 Wake Forest	Bank of America Stadium • Charlotte, NC	ABC	PITT 45–21	57,856	
^{#}Rankings from College Football Playoff. All times are in Eastern Time.

== ACC vs other conferences ==
=== ACC vs Power Five matchups ===
The following games include ACC teams competing against Power Five conferences teams from the Big Ten, Big 12, BYU/Notre Dame, Pac-12 and SEC). All rankings are from the AP Poll at the time of the game.

Date	Conference	Visitor	Home	Site	Score
September 4	SEC	No. 14 Miami	No. 1 Alabama	Mercedes-Benz Stadium • Atlanta, GA (Chick-fil-A Kickoff Game)	L 13–44
September 4	SEC	No. 3 Clemson	No. 5 Georgia	Bank of America Stadium • Charlotte, NC (Duke's Mayo Classic/rivalry)	L 3–10
September 5	Independent	No. 9 Notre Dame	Florida State	Doak Campbell Stadium • Tallahassee, FL	L 38–41 (OT)
September 6	SEC	Ole Miss	Louisville	Mercedes-Benz Stadium • Atlanta, GA (Chick-fil-A Kickoff Game)	L 24–43
September 11	SEC	NC State	Mississippi State	Davis Wade Stadium • Starkville, MS	L 10–24
September 11	SEC	Pittsburgh	Tennessee	Neyland Stadium • Knoxville, TN	W 41–34
September 11	Big Ten	Rutgers	Syracuse	Carrier Dome • Syracuse, NY	L 7–17
September 11	Big Ten	Illinois	Virginia	Scott Stadium • Charlottesville, VA	W 42–14
September 18	Big Ten	Northwestern	Duke	Wallace Wade Stadium • Durham, NC	W 30–23
September 18	Big Ten	Michigan State	No. 24 Miami	Hard Rock Stadium • Miami Gardens, FL	L 17–38
September 18	Big 12	No. 15 Virginia Tech	West Virginia	Milan Puskar Stadium • Morgantown, WV (rivalry)	L 21–27
September 25	SEC	Missouri	Boston College	Alumni Stadium • Chestnut Hill, MA	W 41–34
September 25	Big 12	Kansas	Duke	Wallace Wade Stadium • Durham, NC	W 52–33
October 9	Independent	No. 14 Notre Dame	Virginia Tech	Lane Stadium • Blacksburg, VA	L 29–32
October 30	Independent	Virginia	No. 25 BYU	LaVell Edwards Stadium • Provo, UT	L 49–66
October 30	Independent	North Carolina	No. 11 Notre Dame	Notre Dame Stadium • South Bend, IN	L 34–44
November 13	Independent	No. 7 Notre Dame	Virginia	Scott Stadium • Charlottesville, VA	L 3–28
November 20	Independent	Georgia Tech	No. 6 Notre Dame	Notre Dame Stadium • South Bend, IN	L 0–55
November 27	SEC	Florida State	Florida	Ben Hill Griffin Stadium • Gainesville, FL (rivalry)	L 21–24
November 27	SEC	Georgia	Georgia Tech	Bobby Dodd Stadium • Atlanta, GA (rivalry)	L 0–45
November 27	SEC	Kentucky	Louisville	Cardinal Stadium • Louisville, KY (Governor's Cup)	L 21–52
November 27	SEC	Clemson	South Carolina	Williams–Brice Stadium • Columbia, SC (rivalry)	W 30–0

=== ACC vs Group of Five matchups ===
The following games include ACC teams competing against teams from the American, C-USA, MAC, Mountain West or Sun Belt.

Date	Conference	Visitor	Home	Site	Score
September 2	American	South Florida	NC State	Carter–Finley Stadium • Raleigh, NC	W 45–0
September 3	C-USA	Duke	Charlotte	Jerry Richardson Stadium • Charlotte, NC	L 28–31
September 3	C-USA	Old Dominion	Wake Forest	Truist Field at Wake Forest • Winston-Salem, NC	W 42–10
September 4	MAC	Northern Illinois	Georgia Tech	Bobby Dodd Stadium • Atlanta, GA	L 21–22
September 4	MAC	Syracuse	Ohio	Peden Stadium • Athens, OH	W 22–9
September 11	Sun Belt	Appalachian State	No. 22 Miami	Hard Rock Stadium • Miami Gardens, FL	W 25–23
September 11	Sun Belt	Georgia State	No. 24 North Carolina	Kenan Stadium • Chapel Hill, NC	W 59–17
September 11	C-USA	Middle Tennessee	No. 19 Virginia Tech	Lane Stadium • Blacksburg, VA	W 35–17
September 17	American	UCF	Louisville	Cardinal Stadium • Louisville, KY	W 42–35
September 18	American	Boston College	Temple	Lincoln Financial Field • Philadelphia, PA	W 28–3
September 18	MAC	Western Michigan	Pittsburgh	Heinz Field • Pittsburgh, PA	L 41–44
October 2	C-USA	Louisiana Tech	No. 23 NC State	Carter–Finley Stadium • Raleigh, NC	W 34–27

=== ACC vs FBS independents matchups ===
The following games include ACC teams competing against FBS Independents, which includes Army, Liberty, New Mexico State, UConn or UMass.

Date	Visitor	Home	Site	Score
September 4	UMass	Pittsburgh	Heinz Field • Pittsburgh, PA	W 51–7
September 11	Boston College	UMass	Warren McGuirk Alumni Stadium • Hadley, MA (rivalry)	W 45–28
September 24	Liberty	Syracuse	Carrier Dome • Syracuse, NY	W 24–21
October 23	Wake Forest	Army	Michie Stadium • West Point, NY	W 70–56
October 23	UMass	Florida State	Doak Campbell Stadium • Tallahassee, FL	W 59–3
November 13	UConn	Clemson	Memorial Stadium • Clemson, SC	W 44–7

=== ACC vs FCS matchups ===
The Football Championship Subdivision comprises 13 conferences and two independent programs.

Date	Visitor	Home	Site	Score
September 4	Colgate	Boston College	Alumni Stadium • Chestnut Hill, MA	W 52–10
September 4	William & Mary	Virginia	Scott Stadium • Charlottesville, VA	W 43–0
September 10	North Carolina A&T	Duke	Wallace Wade Stadium • Durham, NC	W 45–17
September 11	South Carolina State	No. 6 Clemson	Memorial Stadium • Clemson, SC	W 49–3
September 11	Jacksonville State	Florida State	Doak Campbell Stadium • Tallahassee, FL	L 17–20
September 11	Kennesaw State	Georgia Tech	Bobby Dodd Stadium • Atlanta, GA	W 45–17
September 11	Eastern Kentucky	Louisville	Cardinal Stadium • Louisville, KY	W 30–3
September 11	Norfolk State	Wake Forest	Truist Stadium at Wake Forest • Winston-Salem, NC	W 41–16
September 18	Furman	NC State	Carter–Finley Stadium • Raleigh, NC	W 45–7
September 18	Albany	Syracuse	Carrier Dome • Syracuse, NY	W 62–24
September 25	Central Connecticut	Miami	Hard Rock Stadium • Miami Gardens, FL	W 69–0
September 25	New Hampshire	Pittsburgh	Heinz Field • Pittsburgh, PA	W 77–7
September 25	Richmond	Virginia Tech	Lane Stadium • Blacksburg, VA	W 21–10
November 20	Wofford	North Carolina	Kenan Stadium • Chapel Hill, NC	W 34–14

=== Records against other conferences ===
Regular season

Power 5 Conferences	Record
Big Ten	2–2
Big 12	1–1
BYU/Notre Dame	0–6
SEC	2–6
Power 5 Total	5–15
Other FBS Conferences	Record
American	3–0
C–USA	3–1
Independents (Excluding BYU & Notre Dame)	6–0
MAC	1–2
Sun Belt	2–0
Other FBS Total	15–3
FCS Opponents	Record
Football Championship Subdivision	13–1
Total Non-Conference Record	33–19

Post Season

Power Conferences 5	Record
Big Ten	1–2
Big 12	1–0
BYU/Notre Dame	0–0
Pac-12	0–0
SEC	0–1
Power 5 Total	2–3
Other FBS Conferences	Record
American	0–0
C–USA	0–0
Independents (Excluding BYU & Notre Dame)	0–0
MAC	0–0
Mountain West	0–1
Sun Belt	0–0
Other FBS Total	0–1
Total Bowl Record	2–4

== Postseason ==
=== Bowl games ===
Legend
ACC win
ACC loss
Cancellation

For the 2020–2025 bowl cycle, The ACC will have annually ten appearances in the following bowls: Orange Bowl and Peach Bowl (unless they are selected for playoffs filled by a SEC and at-large team if champion is in the playoffs), Military Bowl, Duke's Mayo Bowl, Gator Bowl, Cheez-It Bowl, Fenway Bowl, Outback Bowl, Holiday Bowl and Sun Bowl. The ACC teams will go to a New Year's Six bowl if a team finishes higher than the champions of Power Five conferences in the final College Football Playoff rankings. The ACC champion are also eligible for the College Football Playoff if they're among the top four teams in the final CFP ranking.

Bowl game	Date	Site	Television	Time (EST)	ACC team	Opponent	Score	Attendance
Military Bowl	December 27	Navy–Marine Corps Memorial Stadium • Annapolis, MD	ESPN	2:30 p.m.	**Boston College**	East Carolina	Cancelled	
First Responder Bowl	December 28	Gerald J. Ford Stadium • Dallas, TX	ESPN	3:15 p.m.	**Louisville**	Air Force	**L** 28–31	15,251
Holiday Bowl	December 28	Petco Park • San Diego, CA	Fox	8:00 p.m.	No. 18 **NC State**	UCLA	Cancelled	
Fenway Bowl	December 29	Fenway Park • Boston, MA	ESPN	11:00 a.m.	**Virginia**	SMU	Cancelled	
Pinstripe Bowl	December 29	Yankee Stadium • Bronx, NY	ESPN	2:15 p.m.	**Virginia Tech**	Maryland	**L** 10–54	29,653
Cheez-It Bowl	December 29	Camping World Stadium • Orlando, FL	ESPN	5:45 p.m.	No. 19 **Clemson**	Iowa State	**W** 20–13	39,051
Duke's Mayo Bowl	December 30	Bank of America Stadium • Charlotte, NC	ESPN	11:30 a.m.	**North Carolina**	South Carolina	**L** 21–38	45,520
Gator Bowl	December 31	TIAA Bank Field • Jacksonville, FL	ESPN	11:00 a.m.	No. 17 **Wake Forest**	Rutgers	**W** 38–10	28,508
Sun Bowl	December 31	Sun Bowl • El Paso, TX	CBS	12:30 p.m.	**Miami**	Washington State		
**New Year's Six Bowls**
Peach Bowl	December 30	Mercedes Benz Stadium • Atlanta, GA	ESPN	7:00 p.m.	No. 12 **Pittsburgh**	No. 10 Michigan State	**L** 21–31	41,230

Rankings are from AP Poll. Rankings are from CFP rankings. All times Eastern Time Zone. ACC teams shown in bold.
^note 1The Gator Bowl opponent for Wake Forest was originally scheduled to be Texas A&M. Due to COVID-19 issues with Texas A&M, they were replaced with Rutgers.
^note 2The Sun Bowl originally scheduled Miami to face Washington, but Miami had to withdraw due to COVID-19 issues.
^note 3The Military Bowl originally scheduled Boston College to face East Carolina, but Boston College had to withdraw due to COVID-19 issues.
^note 4The Fenway Bowl originally scheduled Virginia to face SMU, but Virginia had to withdraw due to COVID-19 issues.

== Awards and honors ==
=== Player of the week honors ===
Week	Quarterback			Running Back			Receiver			Offensive Line			Defensive Line			Linebacker			Defensive Back			Specialist			Rookie		
Week	Player	Team	Position	Player	Team	Position	Player	Team	Position	Player	Team	Position	Player	Team	Position	Player	Team	Position	Player	Team	Position	Player	Team	Position	Player	Team	Position
Week 1	Phil Jurkovec	Boston College	QB	Mataeo Durant	Duke	RB	Zay Flowers	Boston College	WR	Ikem Ekwonu	NC State	LT	Jermaine Johnson II	Florida State	DE	James Skalski	Clemson	LB	Chamarri Conner	Virginia Tech	CB	Ja'Sir Taylor	Wake Forest	DB	Duce Chestnut	Syracuse	CB
Week 1	Brennan Armstrong	Virginia	QB	Mataeo Durant	Duke	RB	Zay Flowers	Boston College	WR	Ikem Ekwonu	NC State	LT	Jermaine Johnson II	Florida State	DE	James Skalski	Clemson	LB	Chamarri Conner	Virginia Tech	CB	Ja'Sir Taylor	Wake Forest	DB	Jasheen Davis	Wake Forest	DE
Week 2	Brennan Armstrong (2)	Virginia	QB	Pat Garwo III	Boston College	RB	Jelani Woods	Virginia	TE	Olusegun Oluwatimi	Virginia	C	Jordan Domineck	Georgia Tech	DE	Mikel Jones	Syracuse	LB	Kei'Trel Clark	Louisville	CB	Travis Levy	Boston College	KR	Will Shipley	Clemson	RB
Week 2	Brennan Armstrong (2)	Virginia	QB	Pat Garwo III	Boston College	RB	Jelani Woods	Virginia	TE	Olusegun Oluwatimi	Virginia	C	Jordan Domineck	Georgia Tech	DE	Mikel Jones	Syracuse	LB	Brandon Hill	Pittsburgh	S	Travis Levy	Boston College	KR	Will Shipley	Clemson	RB
Week 3	Sam Howell	North Carolina	QB	Ty Chandler	North Carolina	RB	Josh Downs	North Carolina	WR	Marcus McKethan	North Carolina	RG	DeWayne Carter	Duke	DT	LaVonta Bentley	Clemson	LB	Lummie Young IV	Duke	S	Grant Carlson	Boston College	P	Will Shipley (2)	Clemson	RB
Week 3	Sam Howell	North Carolina	QB	Ty Chandler	North Carolina	RB	Josh Downs	North Carolina	WR	Chandler Zavala	NC State	LG	DeWayne Carter	Duke	DT	LaVonta Bentley	Clemson	LB	Lummie Young IV	Duke	S	Grant Carlson	Boston College	P	Will Shipley (2)	Clemson	RB
Week 4	Devin Leary	NC State	QB	Pat Garwo III (2)	Boston College	RB	Emeka Emezie	NC State	WR	Ikem Ekwonu (2)	NC State	OT	Cody Roscoe	Syracuse	DL	Baylon Spector	Clemson	LB	Brandon Sebastian	Boston College	CB	Tayvion Robinson	Virginia Tech	KR	Rodney Hammond	Pittsburgh	RB
Week 4	Devin Leary	NC State	QB	Pat Garwo III (2)	Boston College	RB	Emeka Emezie	NC State	WR	Ikem Ekwonu (2)	NC State	OT	Cody Roscoe	Syracuse	DL	Charlie Thomas	Georgia Tech	LB	Brandon Sebastian	Boston College	CB	Nick Sciba	Wake Forest	PK	Rodney Hammond	Pittsburgh	RB
Week 5	Kenny Pickett	Pittsburgh	QB	Kobe Pace	Clemson	RB	Josh Downs (2)	North Carolina	WR	Gabe Houy	Pittsburgh	OT	Mandy Alonso	Virginia	DE	John Petrishen	Pittsburgh	LB	Traveon Redd	Wake Forest	S	Trenton Gill	NC State	P	Justice Ellison	Wake Forest	RB
Week 6	Brennan Armstrong (3)	Virginia	QB	Sean Tucker	Syracuse	RB	A. T. Perry	Wake Forest	WR	Dillan Gibbons	Florida State	LG	Jermaine Johnson II (2)	Florida State	DE	Ayinde Eley	Georgia Tech	LB	Juanyeh Thomas	Georgia Tech	S	Nick Sciba (2)	Wake Forest	PK	Malik McClain	Florida State	WR
Week 7	Brennan Armstrong (4)	Virginia	QB	Sean Tucker (2)	Syracuse	RB	Josh Downs (3)	North Carolina	WR	Bobby Haskins	Virginia	LT	Mandy Alonso (2)	Virginia	DE	Cedric Gray	North Carolina	LB	Erick Hallett II	Pittsburgh	FS	Devan Boykin	NC State	S	Jaylan Knighton	Miami	RB
Week 7	Brennan Armstrong (4)	Virginia	QB	Sean Tucker (2)	Syracuse	RB	Dontayvion Wicks	Virginia	WR	Bobby Haskins	Virginia	LT	Mandy Alonso (2)	Virginia	DE	Cedric Gray	North Carolina	LB	Erick Hallett II	Pittsburgh	FS	Devan Boykin	NC State	S	Jaylan Knighton	Miami	RB
Week 8	Sam Hartman	Wake Forest	QB	Jaylan Knighton	Miami	RB	Dontayvion Wicks (2)	Virginia	WR	Caleb Chandler	Louisville	OG	Rondell Bothroyd	Wake Forest	DE	SirVocea Dennis	Pittsburgh	LB	Traveon Redd (2)	Wake Forest	SS	Jude Kelley	Georgia Tech	PK	Tyler Van Dyke	Miami	QB
Week 8	Sam Hartman	Wake Forest	QB	Jaylan Knighton	Miami	RB	Dontayvion Wicks (2)	Virginia	WR	Carter Warren	Pittsburgh	OG	Rondell Bothroyd	Wake Forest	DE	James Skalski (2)	Clemson	LB	Traveon Redd (2)	Wake Forest	SS	Jude Kelley	Georgia Tech	PK	Tyler Van Dyke	Miami	QB
Week 9	Sam Hartman (2)	Wake Forest	QB	Sean Tucker (3)	Syracuse	RB	Tré Turner	Virginia Tech	WR	Zach Tom	Wake Forest	LT	Myles Murphy	Clemson	DE	Drake Thomas	NC State	LB	James Williams	Miami	S	Courtney Jackson	Syracuse	KR	Tyler Van Dyke (2)	Miami	QB
Week 9	Sam Hartman (2)	Wake Forest	QB	Sean Tucker (3)	Syracuse	RB	Tré Turner	Virginia Tech	WR	Zach Tom	Wake Forest	LT	Jermaine Johnson II (3)	Florida State	DE	Drake Thomas	NC State	LB	James Williams	Miami	S	Courtney Jackson	Syracuse	KR	Tyler Van Dyke (2)	Miami	QB
Week 10	Kenny Pickett (2)	Pittsburgh	QB	Ty Chandler (2)	North Carolina	RB	Charleston Rambo	Miami	WR	Marcus McKethan (2)	North Carolina	OG	Keir Thomas	Florida State	DE	John Petrishen (2)	Pittsburgh	OLB	Juanyeh Thomas (2)	Georgia Tech	S	Jaylen Stinson	Duke	KR	Tyler Van Dyke (3)	Miami	QB
Week 11	Phil Jurkovec (2)	Boston College	QB	Raheem Blackshear	Virginia Tech	RB	Emeka Emezie (2)	NC State	WR	Michael Jurgens	Wake Forest	C	Jermaine Johnson II (4)	Florida State	DE	SirVocea Dennis (2)	Pittsburgh	LB	Omarion Cooper	Florida State	CB	Zonovan Knight	NC State	KR	Ahmari Huggins-Bruce	Louisville	WR
Week 11	Phil Jurkovec (2)	Boston College	QB	Raheem Blackshear	Virginia Tech	RB	Emeka Emezie (2)	NC State	WR	Michael Jurgens	Wake Forest	C	Jermaine Johnson II (4)	Florida State	DE	SirVocea Dennis (2)	Pittsburgh	LB	Omarion Cooper	Florida State	CB	Zonovan Knight	NC State	KR	Omarion Cooper	Florida State	CB
Week 12	Malik Cunningham	Louisville	QB	Kobe Pace	Clemson	RB	Jordan Addison	Pittsburgh	WR	Jordan McFadden	Clemson	OT	Kier Thomas (2)	Florida State	DE	Drake Thomas (2)	NC State	LB	Akeem Dent	Florida State	S	Israel Abanikanda	Pittsburgh	KR	Will Shipley (3)	Clemson	RB
Week 12	Malik Cunningham	Louisville	QB	Kobe Pace	Clemson	RB	Jordan Addison	Pittsburgh	WR	Jordan McFadden	Clemson	OT	Kier Thomas (2)	Florida State	DE	Drake Thomas (2)	NC State	LB	Akeem Dent	Florida State	S	Israel Abanikanda	Pittsburgh	KR	Tyler Van Dyke (4)	Miami	QB
Week 13	Devin Leary (2)	NC State	QB	Raheem Blackshear	Virginia Tech	RB	Emeka Emezie (3)	NC State	WR	Jordan McFadden (2)	Clemson	OT	Daniel Joseph	NC State	DE	Mikel Jones (2)	Syracuse	LB	Jammie Robinson	Florida State	S	Jordan Houston	NC State	RB	Tyler Van Dyke (5)	Miami	QB

=== All-Conference teams ===
First Team

Position	Player	Team
First Team Offense
QB	Kenny Pickett	Pittsburgh
RB	Sean Tucker	Syracuse
RB	Mataeo Durant	Duke
WR	Jordan Addison	Pittsburgh
WR	Josh Downs	North Carolina
WR	Dontayvion Wicks (tie)	Virginia
WR	A. T. Perry (tie)	Wake Forest
TE	Jelani Woods	Virginia
T	Ikem Ekwonu	NC State
T	Zach Tom	Wake Forest
G	Zion Johnson	Boston College
G	Caleb Chandler	Louisville
C	Alec Lindstrom	Boston College
All Purpose Back	Jahmyr Gibbs	Georgia Tech
First Team Defense
DE	Jermaine Johnson II	Florida State
DE	Cody Roscoe	Syracuse
DT	Calijah Kancey	Pittsburgh
DT	Cory Durden (tie)	NC State
DT	Tyler Davis (tie)	Clemson
LB	Drake Thomas	NC State
LB	Mikel Jones	Syracuse
LB	James Skalski	Clemson
CB	Mario Goodrich	Clemson
CB	Andrew Booth Jr.	Clemson
S	Jammie Robinson	Florida State
S	Tanner Ingle	NC State
First Team Special Teams
PK	Nick Sciba	Wake Forest
P	Trenton Gill	NC State
SP	Zonovan Knight	NC State

Second Team

Position	Player	Team
Second Team Offense
QB	Sam Hartman	Wake Forest
RB	Ty Chandler	North Carolina
RB	Pat Garwo	Boston College
WR	Charleston Rambo	Miami
WR	Emeka Emezie	NC State
WR	Jaquarii Roberson	Wake Forest
TE	Lucas Krull	Pittsburgh
T	Jordan McFadden	Clemson
T	Carter Warren	Pittsburgh
G	Christian Mahogany	Boston College
G	DJ Scaife	Miami
C	Olusegun Oluwatimi	Virginia
All Purpose Back	Keytaon Thompson	Virginia
Second Team Defense
DE	Myles Murphy	Clemson
DE	Habakkuk Baldonado	Pittsburgh
DT	Miles Fox	Wake Forest
DT	Myles Murphy	North Carolina
LB	Yasir Abdullah	Louisville
LB	Nick Jackson	Virginia
LB	Quez Jackson (tie)	Georgia Tech
LB	SirVocea Dennis (tie)	Pittsburgh
CB	Jermaine Waller	Virginia Tech
CB	Josh Deberry (tie)	Boston College
CB	Kei'Trel Clark (tie)	Louisville
S	Traveon Redd	Wake Forest
S	Brandon Hill	Pittsburgh
Second Team Special Teams
PK	B. T. Potter	Clemson
P	Lou Hedley	Miami
SP	Jahmyr Gibbs	Georgia Tech

Third Team

Position	Player	Team
Third Team Offense
QB	Brennan Armstrong	Virginia
RB	Jashaun Corbin	Florida State
RB	Jahmyr Gibbs	Georgia Tech
WR	Zay Flowers	Boston College
WR	Billy Kemp	Virginia
WR	Jake Bobo	Duke
TE	Marshon Ford	Louisville
T	Ben Petrula	Boston College
T	Gabe Houy	Pittsburgh
G	Marcus Minor	Pittsburgh
G	Sean Maginn	Wake Forest
C	Grant Gibson	NC State
All Purpose Back	Jordan Addison	Pittsburgh
Third Team Defense
DE	Keir Thomas	Florida State
DE	Xavier Thomas	Clemson
DT	Bryan Bresee	Clemson
DT	DeWayne Carter	Duke
LB	Shaka Heyward	Duke
LB	Tomon Fox	North Carolina
LB	Jeremiah Gemmel	North Carolina
CB	Brandon Sebasitan	Boston College
CB	Duce Chestnut	Syracuse
S	Cam'Ron Kelly	North Carolina
S	Andrew Mukuba	Clemson
Third Team Special Teams
PK	Sam Scarton	Pittsburgh
P	Peter Moore	Virginia Tech
SP	Tayvion Robinson	Virginia Tech

=== ACC individual awards ===
ACC Player of the Year

Kenny Pickett, Pittsburgh

ACC Rookie of the Year

Tyler Van Dyke, Miami

ACC Coach of the Year

Dave Clawson, Wake Forest

ACC Offensive Player of the Year

Kenny Pickett, Pittsburgh

ACC Offensive Rookie of the Year

Tyler Van Dyke, Miami

Jacobs Blocking Trophy

Ikem Ekwonu, NC State

ACC Defensive Player of the Year

Jermaine Johnson II, Florida State

ACC Defensive Rookie of the Year

Andrew Mukuba, Clemson

=== All-Americans ===
==== Consensus All-Americans ====
Currently, the NCAA compiles consensus all-America teams in the sports of Division I FBS football and Division I men's basketball using a point system computed from All-America teams named by coaches associations or media sources. Players are chosen against other players playing at their position only. To be selected a consensus All-American, players must be chosen to the first team on at least half of the five official selectors as recognized by the NCAA. Second- and third-team honors are used to break ties. Players named first-team by all five selectors are deemed unanimous All-Americans. Currently, the NCAA recognizes All-Americans selected by the AP, AFCA, FWAA, TSN, and the WCFF to determine consensus and unanimous All-Americans.

2021 Consensus All-Americans
Unanimous	Consensus
Ikem Ekwonu – NC State	Jordan Addison – Pittsburgh

==== Associated Press ====
2021 AP All-Americans
First Team	Second Team	Third Team
Ikem Ekwonu – NC State; Zion Johnson – Boston College; Jordan Addison – Pittsburgh	Kenny Pickett – Pittsburgh; Sean Tucker – Syracuse; Alec Lindstrom – Boston College; Jahmyr Gibbs – Georgia Tech; Jermaine Johnson II – Florida State	Calijah Kancey – Pittsburgh

==== AFCA ====
2021 AFCA All-Americans
First Team	Second Team
Ikem Ekwonu – NC State; Kenny Pickett – Pittsburgh; Cal Adomitis – Pittsburgh	Jordan Addison – Pittsburgh; Zion Johnson – Boston College; Sean Tucker – Syracuse; Jermaine Johnson II – Florida State

==== FWAA ====
2021 FWAA All-Americans
First Team	Second Team
Sean Tucker – Syracuse; Jordan Addison – Pittsburgh; Ikem Ekwonu – NC State	Kenny Pickett – Pittsburgh; Zach Tom – Wake Forest; Olusegun Oluwatimi – Virginia; Jermaine Johnson II – Florida State

==== The Sporting News ====
2021 Sporting News All-Americans
First Team	Second Team
Jordan Addison – Pittsburgh; Ikem Ekwonu – NC State	Kenny Pickett – Pittsburgh; Alec Lindstrom – Boston College

==== WCFF ====
2021 Walter Camp All-Americans
First Team	Second Team
Jordan Addison – Pittsburgh; Ikem Ekwonu – NC State; Zion Johnson – Boston College; Kenny Pickett – Pittsburgh; Jermaine Johnson II – Florida State	Sean Tucker – Syracuse

=== National Awards ===
- Johnny Unitas Golden Arm Award: Kenny Pickett, Pittsburgh

== Home game attendance ==
Team	Stadium	Capacity	Game 1	Game 2	Game 3	Game 4	Game 5	Game 6	Game 7	Total	Average	% of Capacity
Boston College	Alumni Stadium	44,500	28,991	44,500†	40,349	35,637	33,363	25,854		208,694	34,782	78.16%
Clemson	Memorial Stadium	81,500	78,609	81,500†	79,159	79,097	77,522	81,048		476,935	79,489	97.53%
Duke	Wallace Wade Stadium	40,004	18,091	12,323	19,128	11,849	20,693†	8,493	17,391	107,968	15,424	38.56%
Florida State	Doak Campbell Stadium	79,560	68,316	60,198	50,964	56,609	51,915	50,835	71,917†	410,754	58,679	73.75%
Georgia Tech	Bobby Dodd Stadium	55,000	33,651	35,195	37,450	36,383	35,543	31,511	52,806†	262,539	37,506	68.19%
Louisville	Cardinal Stadium	60,800	39,673	39,022	40,320	38,202	51,729	43,797	55,018†	307,761	43,966	72.31%
Miami	Hard Rock Stadium	65,326	45,877	46,427	44,019	37,269	43,293	48,161†	40,839	305,885	43,698	66.89%
North Carolina	Kenan Memorial Stadium	50,500	50,500†	50,500†	45,812	44,805	50,500†	50,500†	43,011	335,628	47,947	94.94%
NC State	Carter–Finley Stadium	56,919	52,633	56,919†	56,919†	51,064	53,123	54,083	56,919†	381,660	54,523	95.79%
Pittsburgh	Heinz Field	68,400	41,486	40,581	41,048	60,594†	46,977	41,687	45,183	317,556	45,365	66.32%
Syracuse	Carrier Dome	49,262	31,941	30,156	29,942	38,554†	36,670	32,022	27,939	227,224	32,461	65.89%
Virginia	Scott Stadium	61,500	42,982	36,036	38,699	38,489	45,837	48,584†	46,445	297,072	42,439	69.01%
Virginia Tech	Lane Stadium	65,632	65,632†	53,680	53,174	65,632†	58,314	57,941	56,730	411,103	58,729	89.48%
Wake Forest	BB&T Field	31,500	25,673	21,896	29,564	29,077	**31,613**	**34,503**†		172,326	28,721	91.18%

Bold – Exceeded capacity
†Season High

== NFL draft ==
=== Total Picks by School ===
Team	Round 1	Round 2	Round 3	Round 4	Round 5	Round 6	Round 7	Total
Boston College	1	–	–	–	–	–	–	1
Clemson	–	1	–	–	–	–	1	2
Duke	–	–	–	–	–	–	–	0
Florida State	1	–	–	–	–	–	–	1
Georgia Tech	–	–	–	–	–	–	1	1
Louisville	–	–	–	–	–	–	–	0
Miami	–	–	–	–	–	–	1	1
North Carolina	–	–	1	–	3	–	–	4
NC State	1	–	–	–	–	–	1	2
Pittsburgh	1	–	–	1	–	–	–	2
Syracuse	–	–	–	–	–	–	–	0
Virginia	–	–	1	–	–	–	–	1
Virginia Tech	–	–	–	–	1	3	–	4
Wake Forest	–	–	–	1	–	1	–	2
Total	4	1	2	2	4	4	4	21

=== List of Selections ===
Player	Position	School	Draft Round	Round Pick	Overall Pick	Team
Ikem Ekwonu	OT	NC State	1	6	6	Carolina Panthers
Zion Johnson	OG	Boston College	1	17	17	Los Angeles Chargers
Kenny Pickett	QB	Pittsburgh	1	20	20	Pittsburgh Steelers
Jermaine Johnson II	DE	Florida State	1	26	26	New York Jets
Andrew Booth Jr.	CB	Clemson	2	10	42	Minnesota Vikings
Joshua Ezeudu	OG	North Carolina	3	3	67	New York Giants
Jelani Woods	TE	Virginia	3	9	73	Indianapolis Colts
Damarri Mathis	CB	Pittsburgh	4	10	115	Denver Broncos
Zach Tom	OG	Wake Forest	4	35	140	Green Bay Packers
Sam Howell	QB	North Carolina	5	1	144	Washington Commanders
Ty Chandler	RB	North Carolina	5	26	169	Minnesota Vikings
Marcus McKethan	OG	North Carolina	5	30	173	New York Giants
James Mitchell	TE	Virginia Tech	5	34	177	Detroit Lions
Amaré Barno	LB	Virginia Tech	6	10	189	Carolina Panthers
Luke Tenuta	OT	Virginia Tech	6	30	209	Buffalo Bills
Ja'Sir Taylor	CB	Wake Forest	6	35	214	Los Angeles Chargers
Lecitus Smith	OG	Virginia Tech	6	36	215	Arizona Cardinals
Tariq Carpenter	LB	Georgia Tech	7	7	228	Green Bay Packers
Baylon Spector	LB	Clemson	7	10	231	Buffalo Bills
Jonathan Ford	DT	Miami (FL)	7	13	234	Green Bay Packers
Trenton Gill	P	NC State	7	34	255	Chicago Bears
