= James Skalski =

American football player and coach (born 1998)

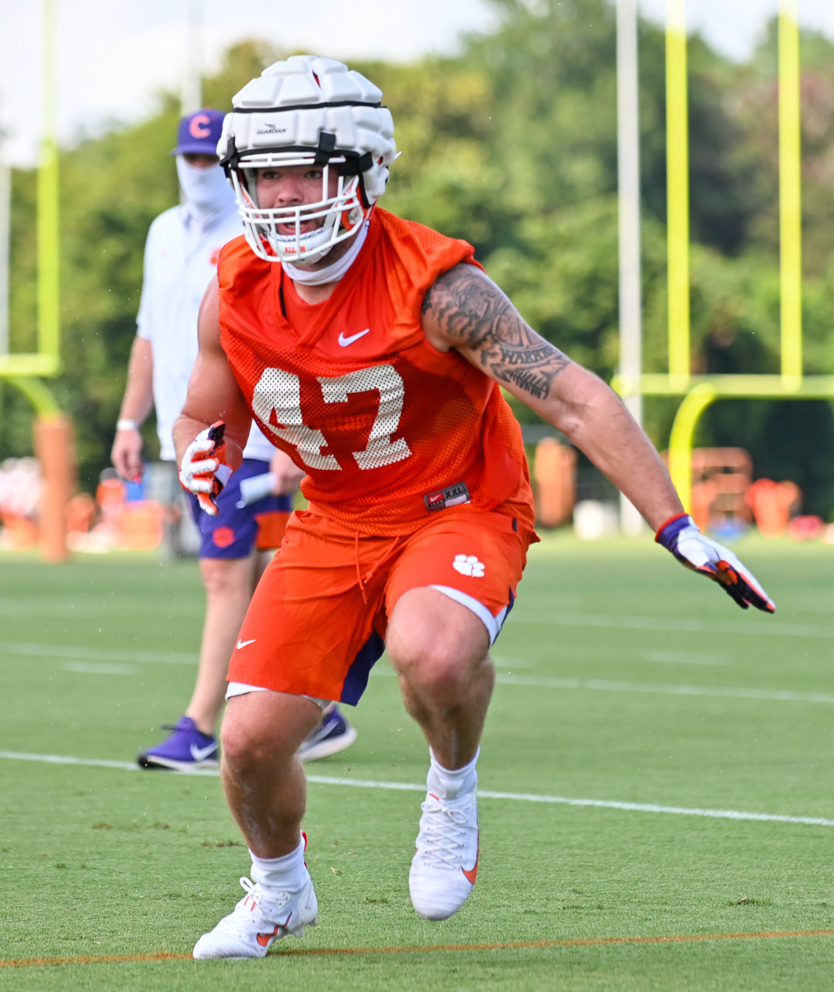
- Skalski with the Clemson Tigers in 2020

Oklahoma Sooners
- Title: Linebacker

Personal information
- Born: February 2, 1998 (age 28); Sharpsburg, Georgia, U.S.
- Listed height: 6 ft 0 in (1.83 m)
- Listed weight: 228 lb (103 kg)

Career information
- High school: Northgate (Newnan, Georgia)
- College: Clemson (2016–2021)
- NFL draft: 2022: undrafted

Career history

Playing
- Indianapolis Colts (2022)*
- * Offseason or practice squad member only

Coaching
- Oklahoma (2023–present) Graduate assistant

Awards and highlights
- 2× CFP National Champion (2016, 2018); First team All-ACC (2021); Second team All-ACC (2020)

James Skalski (born February 2, 1998) is an American football coach and former linebacker. He is currently a coach for the Oklahoma Sooners football program. He last played for the Indianapolis Colts of the National Football League (NFL). He played college football at Clemson.

== Early life ==
Skalski attended Northgate High School in Newnan, Georgia, where he played soccer as well as linebacker and punter on the gridiron. As a junior, he was limited to seven games due to a thumb injury but had 78 tackles and three sacks, earning All-County honors. Skalski recorded 170 tackles as a senior including 33 tackles for loss, 11 sacks, three forced fumbles, two fumble recoveries, an interception and two defensive touchdowns. He was named the Region 4-AAAAA Defensive Player of the Year. In February 2015, Skalski committed to Clemson over offers from Louisville, Marshall, Ole Miss, North Carolina, South Carolina, UCF and Wake Forest.

== College career ==
As a freshman in 2016, Skalski had 14 tackles, with eight tackles coming on special teams plays. He recorded 37 tackles, including two tackles for loss as a sophomore while starting two games. Skalski redshirted the 2018 season after sustaining an injury in preseason practice. Due to a new NCAA rule, he was able to return at the end of the season while keeping his redshirt and helped Clemson win the national championship. As a redshirt junior in 2019, Skalski was second on the team with 105 tackles, including 7.5 for loss, as well as 4.5 sacks, four pass breakups, a forced fumble, and a fumble recovery. He was named to the All-ACC Academic Team. In the 2020 College Football Playoff National Championship against LSU, he had six tackles, a sack and a pass breakup, but was ejected due to a targeting penalty.

Coming into his senior season, Skalski was named to the Butkus Award watchlist. He focused on improving his diet by cutting out junk food and lowering his sugar intake. On October 24, 2020, Skalski missed the game against Syracuse with a groin injury during practice. After an MRI revealed more significant damage which required surgery, he was ruled out for several weeks. Skalski returned in the win against Pittsburgh on November 28. He was ejected in the Sugar Bowl for targeting after lowering his helmet into the body of Justin Fields in the second quarter of a 49–28 loss to Ohio State.

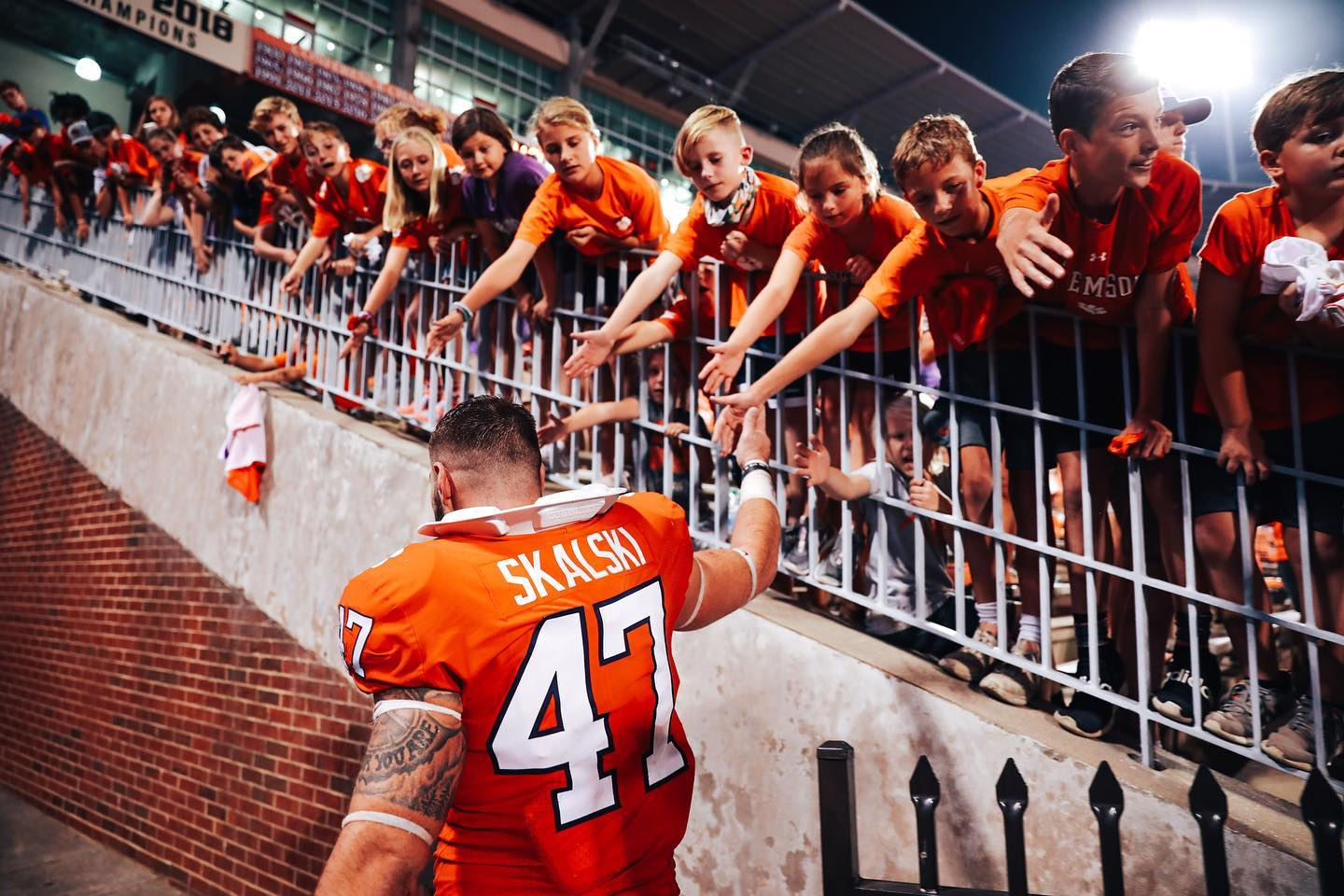
Young fans loving Skalski as he exits Memorial Stadium, Clemson University 2021.

=== College statistics ===
Year	Team	Games	Tackles				
Year	Team	Games	Total	Solo	Ast	TFL	Sacks
2016	Clemson	7	11	6	5	2.0	1.0
2017	Clemson	12	31	16	15	2.0	0.5
2018	Clemson	3	5	3	2	1.0	0.0
2019	Clemson	15	90	45	45'	6.5	3.5
2020	Clemson	9	34	22	12	2.0	1.0
2021	Clemson	13	87	40	47	4.5	2.5
Career		59	258	132	126	18.0	8.5

== Professional career ==
Pre-draft measurables
Height	Weight	Arm length	Hand span	40-yard dash	10-yard split	20-yard split	20-yard shuttle	Three-cone drill	Vertical jump	Broad jump	Bench press
5 ft 11 7/8 in (1.83 m)	228 lb (103 kg)	30 1/2 in (0.77 m)	9 1/8 in (0.23 m)	4.72 s	1.63 s	2.72 s	4.32 s	6.96 s	34.0 in (0.86 m)	9 ft 6 in (2.90 m)	26 reps
All values from Pro Day

Skalski signed with the Indianapolis Colts as an undrafted free agent on May 13, 2022. He was released from the Colts on August 31, 2022.

== Coaching career ==
Skalski announced that he was joining Oklahoma as a coach on January 22, 2023.

== Personal life ==
Skalski is the son of John and Sherri Skalski. His older sister Brenna played softball at Georgia State. Skalski's father died of a heart attack on October 14, 2016, while mowing the lawn. Skalski missed Clemson's following game against NC State. He got a tattoo on his left bicep that says, "War like the warrior you are," based on a quote of his father's.
