= Jelani Woods =

American football player (born 1998)

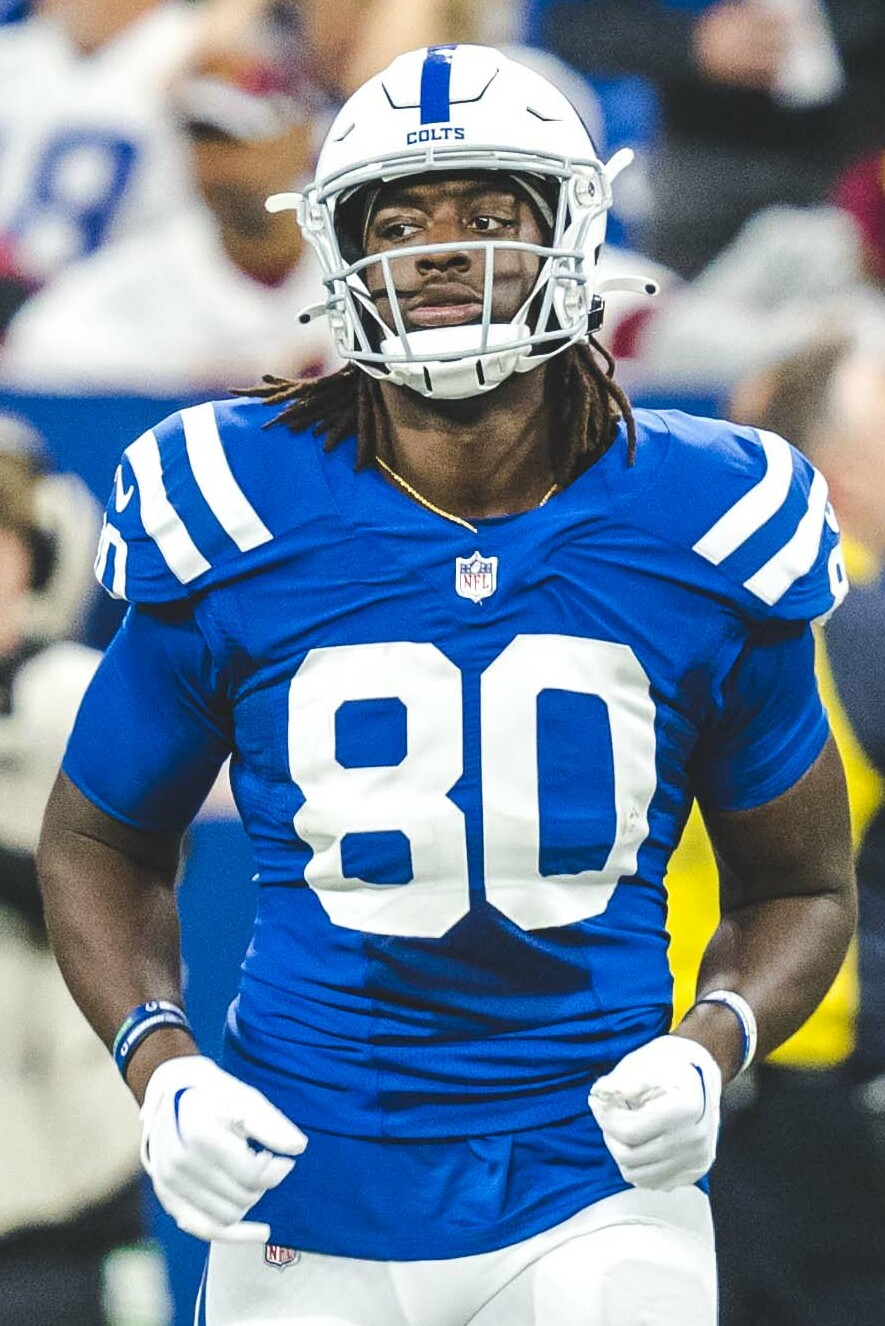
- Woods with the Indianapolis Colts in 2022

No. 86 – New York Jets
- Position: Tight end
- Roster status: Active

Personal information
- Born: October 9, 1998 (age 28); Ellenwood, Georgia, U.S.
- Listed height: 6 ft 7 in (2.01 m)
- Listed weight: 253 lb (115 kg)

Career information
- High school: Cedar Grove (Ellenwood)
- College: Oklahoma State (2017–2020); Virginia (2021)
- NFL draft: 2022: 3rd round, 73rd overall pick

Career history
- Indianapolis Colts (2022–2024); New York Jets (2025–present)

Awards and highlights
- First-team All-ACC (2021)

Career NFL statistics as of Week 7, 2026
- Receptions: 30
- Receiving yards: 355
- Receiving touchdowns: 3
- Stats at Pro Football Reference

Jelani Woods (born October 9, 1998) is an American professional football tight end for the New York Jets of the National Football League (NFL). He played college football for the Oklahoma State Cowboys before transferring to the Virginia Cavaliers for 2021, when he was named first-team All-ACC. Woods was selected by the Colts in the third round of the 2022 NFL draft.

== Early life ==
Woods grew up in Ellenwood, Georgia, and attended Cedar Grove High School. He played quarterback and passed for 1,992 yards with 20 touchdown passes against six interceptions in his junior season. Woods was also named honorable mention All-State in basketball by The Atlanta Journal-Constitution. As a senior, he was named honorable mention All-State and first-team All-Region 5 3A after passing for 2,316 yards and 26 touchdowns. Woods was rated a three-star recruit and committed to play college football at Oklahoma State over offers from Michigan, Louisville, Kansas State, and South Carolina.

== College career ==
Woods began his college career at Oklahoma State. He joined the team as an early enrollee and redshirted his freshman year and was moved from quarterback to tight end during the Cowboys practices leading up to the 2017 Camping World Bowl. Woods finished his redshirt freshman season with seven receptions for 120 yards and two touchdowns. As a redshirt sophomore, he caught 16 passes for 112 yards and a touchdown and was an honorable mention All-Big 12 Conference selection. Woods had eight receptions for 129 yards and a touchdown and was again named honorable mention All-Big 12 as a redshirt junior.

Following the end of the season, Woods announced he would be transferring to Virginia Cavaliers as a graduate student. He was named first-team All-Atlantic Coast Conference after catching 44 passes for 598 yards and eight touchdowns.

== Professional career ==
Pre-draft measurables
Height	Weight	Arm length	Hand span	Wingspan	40-yard dash	10-yard split	20-yard split	20-yard shuttle	Three-cone drill	Vertical jump	Broad jump	Bench press
6 ft 7 1/8 in (2.01 m)	253 lb (115 kg)	34 1/8 in (0.87 m)	9 1/4 in (0.23 m)	6 ft 10 1/8 in (2.09 m)	4.61 s	1.62 s	2.62 s	4.33 s	6.95 s	37.5 in (0.95 m)	10 ft 9 in (3.28 m)	24 reps
All values from NFL Combine/Pro Day

=== Indianapolis Colts ===
Woods was drafted by the Indianapolis Colts in the third round with the 73rd overall pick in the 2022 NFL draft. In Week 3, against the Kansas City Chiefs, Woods scored his first two professional touchdowns on his first two career receptions in a 20–17 victory. He finished the season with 25 catches for 312 yards and three touchdowns.

On August 30, 2023, Woods was placed on injured reserve.

On August 23, 2024, it was announced that Woods had undergone toe surgery and would miss roughly four months in recovery.

On August 26, 2025, Woods was waived by the Colts as part of final roster cuts.

=== New York Jets ===
On August 27, 2025, Woods was claimed off waivers by the New York Jets.

On March 11, 2026, Woods re-signed with the Jets.

== Additional reading ==
- Andrew Moore, "Jelani Woods: Indianapolis Colts Rookie Files," Horseshoe Huddle, August 31, 2022.
