= Jermaine Johnson II =

American football player (born 1999)

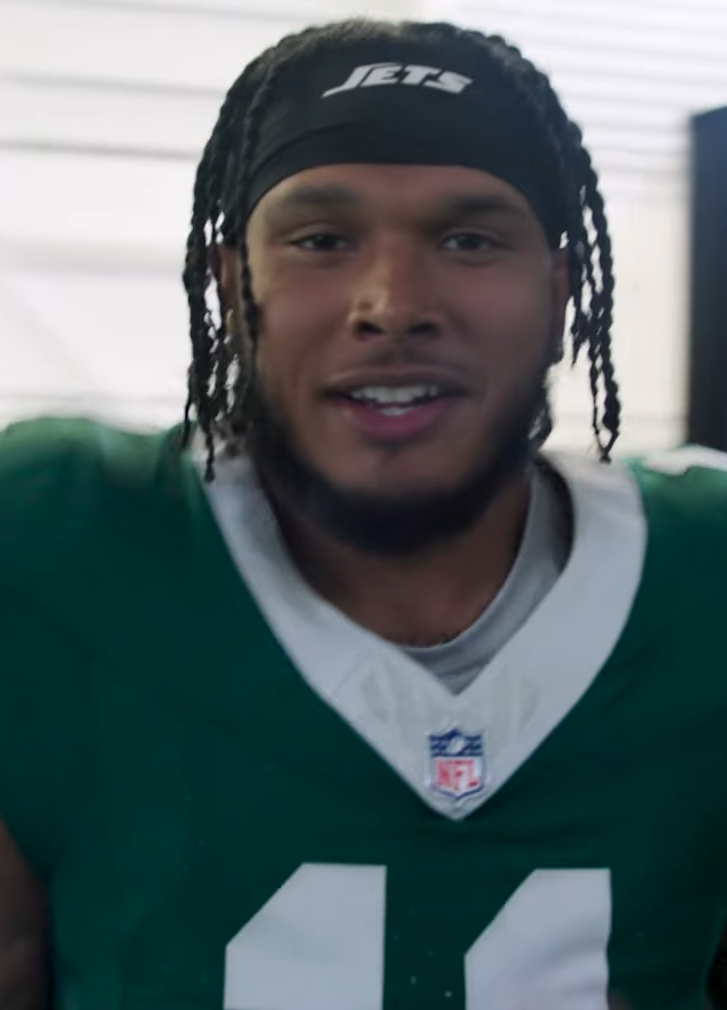
- Johnson with the New York Jets in 2025

No. 11 – Tennessee Titans
- Position: Defensive end
- Roster status: Active

Personal information
- Born: January 7, 1999 (age 27); Eden Prairie, Minnesota, U.S.
- Listed height: 6 ft 5 in (1.96 m)
- Listed weight: 254 lb (115 kg)

Career information
- High school: Eden Prairie
- College: Independence CC (2017–2018); Georgia (2019–2020); Florida State (2021)
- NFL draft: 2022: 1st round, 26th overall pick

Career history
- New York Jets (2022–2025); Tennessee Titans (2026–present)

Awards and highlights
- Pro Bowl (2023); First-team All-American (2021); ACC Defensive Player of the Year (2021); First-team All-ACC (2021)

Career NFL statistics as of Week 10, 2026
- Total tackles: 154
- Sacks: 16.0
- Forced fumbles: 1
- Fumble recoveries: 1
- Pass deflections: 9
- Interceptions: 1
- Defensive touchdowns: 1
- Stats at Pro Football Reference

Jermaine Curtis Johnson II (born January 7, 1999) is an American professional football defensive end for the Tennessee Titans of the National Football League (NFL). He played college football for the Georgia Bulldogs and Florida State Seminoles, where he was named the ACC Defensive Player of the Year. He also played junior college football for the Independence Pirates. Johnson was selected by the New York Jets in the first round of the 2022 NFL draft.

== Early life ==
Johnson grew up in Eden Prairie, Minnesota, and attended Eden Prairie High School. As a senior, he was named All-Metro after recording 37 tackles and seven sacks. Johnson was academically ineligible to play NCAA Division I football after graduation.

== College career ==
Johnson began his collegiate career at Independence Community College. While at Independence, he was featured in the fourth season of the Netflix documentary series Last Chance U, where he played under head coach Jason Brown. As a freshman, he had 58 tackles, eight sacks and three forced fumbles. Johnson transferred to the University of Georgia following the season.

Johnson played in every game for the Georgia Bulldogs as a sophomore, where he had 20 tackles and 2.5 sacks. As a senior, he finished third on the team with four sacks with 16 total tackles and 11 quarterback hurries. Towards the end of the season, Johnson entered the transfer portal and enrolled at Florida State University for his final season of NCAA eligibility. Johnson had seven tackles, 2.5 tackles for loss and 1.5 sacks in his first game for the Florida State Seminoles, a 41–38 overtime loss to the Notre Dame Fighting Irish, and was named the Atlantic Coast Conference Defensive Lineman of the Week. He was named the ACC Defensive Player of the Year and first-team All-ACC after he finished the season with 70 tackles and led the ACC with 18 tackles for loss and 12 sacks.

== Professional career ==
Pre-draft measurables
Height	Weight	Arm length	Hand span	Wingspan	40-yard dash	10-yard split	20-yard split	Vertical jump	Broad jump	Bench press
6 ft 4 5/8 in (1.95 m)	254 lb (115 kg)	34 in (0.86 m)	9 7/8 in (0.25 m)	6 ft 9 5/8 in (2.07 m)	4.58 s	1.55 s	2.68 s	32.0 in (0.81 m)	10 ft 5 in (3.18 m)	21 reps
All values from NFL Combine/Pro Day

=== New York Jets ===
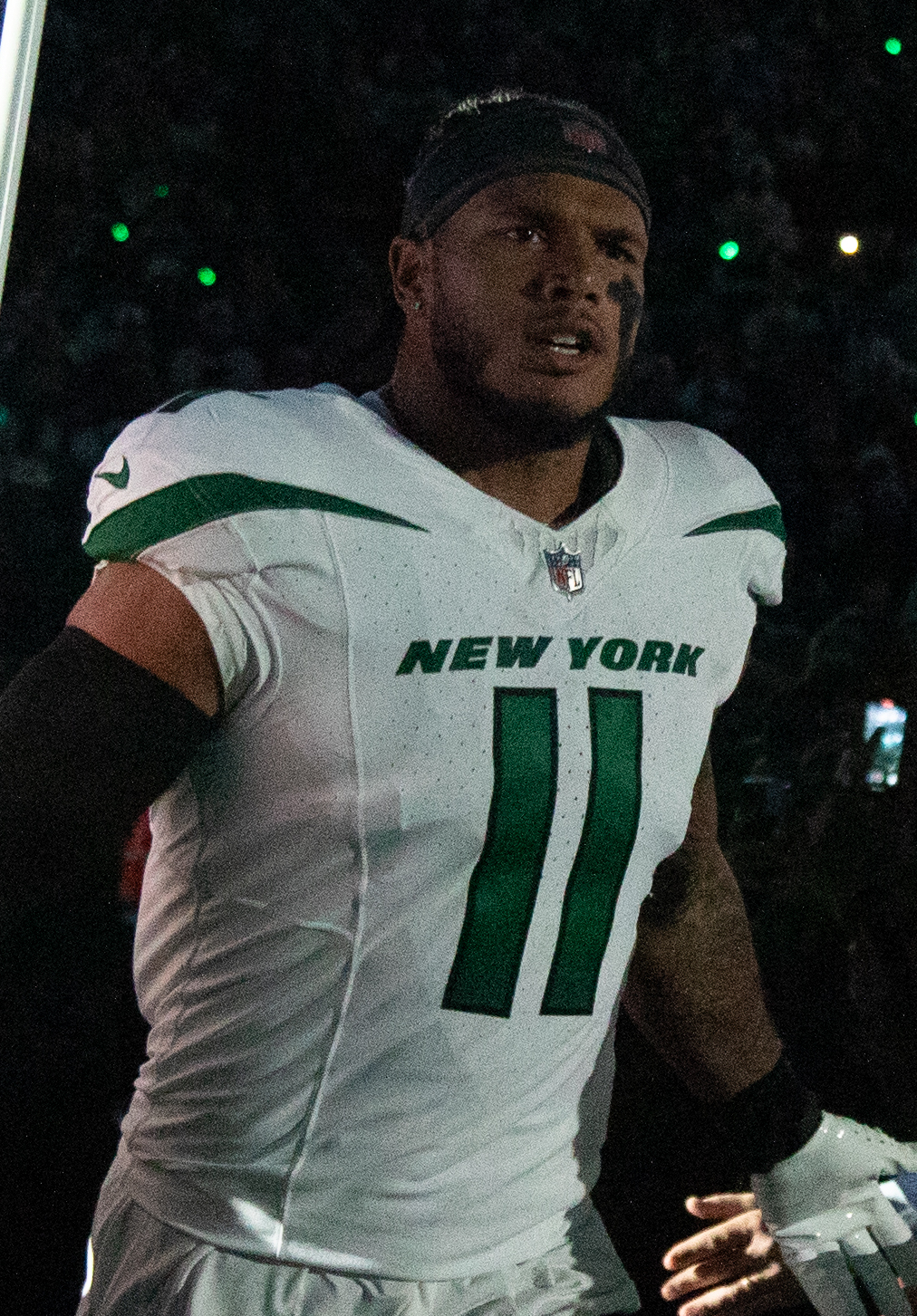
Johnson with the New York Jets in 2023

Johnson was selected in the first round with the 26th overall pick by the New York Jets in the 2022 NFL draft. In week 14, against the Buffalo Bills, he blocked a punt that resulted in a safety. As a rookie, he appeared in 14 games and recorded 2.5 sacks and 29 total tackles. In week 17 of the 2023 season, he had 37-yard interception return for a touchdown against the Browns. In the 2023 season, he started in all 17 games. He finished with 7.5 sacks, 55 total tackles, one interception, seven passes defended, one forced fumble, and one fumble recovery.

On September 16, 2024, Johnson announced that he had suffered a torn Achilles tendon in the Jets' week 2 game against the Tennessee Titans, and would miss the remainder of the season as a result.

On April 21, 2025, the Jets picked up the fifth-year option on Johnson's contract.

=== Tennessee Titans ===
On March 12, 2026, Johnson was traded to the Tennessee Titans in exchange for T'Vondre Sweat.

== NFL career statistics ==
Legend
	Led the league
**Bold**	Career high

=== Regular season ===
Year	Team	Games		Tackles						Interceptions						Fumbles				
Year	Team	GP	GS	Cmb	Solo	Ast	Sck	TFL	Sfty	Int	Yds	Avg	Lng	TD	PD	FF	Fmb	FR	Yds	TD
2022	NYJ	14	0	29	18	11	2.5	3	**1**	0	0	0.0	0	0	0	0	0	0	0	0
2023	NYJ	17	17	**55**	**36**	19	**7.5**	**11**	0	**1**	**37**	**37.0**	**37**	**1**	**7**	**1**	0	**1**	0	0
2024	NYJ	2	2	4	4	0	0.0	1	0	0	0	0.0	0	0	0	0	0	0	0	0
2025	NYJ	14	13	43	22	**21**	3.0	5	0	0	0	0.0	0	0	2	0	0	0	0	0
2026	TEN	9	9	23	13	10	3.0	6	0	0	0	0.0	0	0	0	0	0	0	0	0
Career		56	41	154	93	61	16.0	26	1	1	37	37.0	37	1	9	1	0	1	0	0
