= Duce Chestnut =

American football player (born 2002)

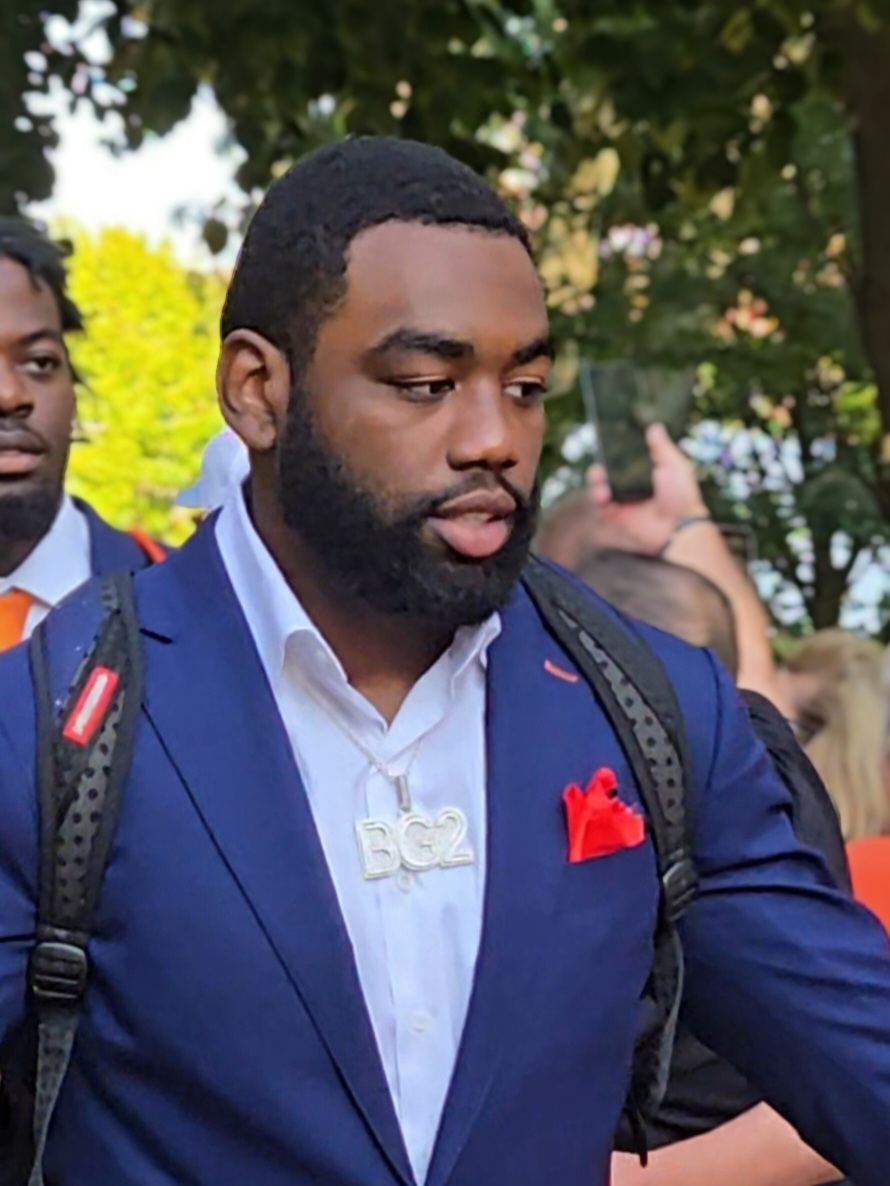
- Chestnut with the Syracuse Orange in 2024

No. 0 – Syracuse Orange
- Position: Cornerback
- Class: Redshirt Junior

Personal information
- Born: December 5, 2002 (age 23)
- Listed height: 5 ft 10 in (1.78 m)
- Listed weight: 200 lb (91 kg)

Career information
- High school: Camden (Camden, New Jersey)
- College: Syracuse (2021–2022); LSU (2023); Syracuse (2024–2025)

Awards and highlights
- Third-team All-ACC (2021)
- Stats at Pro Football Reference

Darian "Duce" Chestnut (born December 5, 2002) is an American college football cornerback for the Syracuse Orange. He previously played for the LSU Tigers.

== Early life ==
Chestnut attended Camden High School in Camden, New Jersey, and was rated as a four-star recruit. On August 2, 2020, he committed to play college football for the Syracuse Orange over offers such as Miami, Louisville, Ole Miss, Michigan, Michigan State, and Rutgers.

== College career ==
=== Syracuse ===
In 2021 and 2022, Chestnut appeared in 24 games for the Orange, recording 83 tackles with six being for a loss, nine pass deflections, four interceptions, and a touchdown. In 2021, he was named a freshman all-American, third-team all-Atlantic Coast Conference (ACC), and was the runner-up for the ACC defensive rookie of the year. After two seasons with the Orange, Chestnut entered his name into the NCAA transfer portal.

=== LSU ===
Chestnut transferred to play for the LSU Tigers. In his Tiger debut in week one of the 2023 season, he notched an interception versus USC. During his first season at LSU, Chestnut only appeared in four games due to injury, notching six tackles and an interception. After the conclusion of the 2023 season, Chestnut once again entered his name into the NCAA transfer portal.

=== Syracuse (second stint) ===
Chestnut transferred back to play for the Syracuse Orange.

== Professional career ==
Pre-draft measurables
Height	Weight	Arm length	Hand span	Wingspan	40-yard dash	10-yard split	20-yard split	20-yard shuttle	Vertical jump	Broad jump	Bench press
5 ft 10 3/8 in (1.79 m)	200 lb (91 kg)	30 1/2 in (0.77 m)	9 1/8 in (0.23 m)	6 ft 2 1/4 in (1.89 m)	4.60 s	1.63 s	2.73 s	4.70 s	30.5 in (0.77 m)	9 ft 8 in (2.95 m)	16 reps
All values from Pro Day
