= Calijah Kancey =

American football player (born 2001)

No. 94 – Tampa Bay Buccaneers
- Position: Defensive tackle
- Roster status: Active

Personal information
- Born: March 1, 2001 (age 25); Miami, Florida, U.S.
- Listed height: 6 ft 0 in (1.83 m)
- Listed weight: 280 lb (127 kg)

Career information
- High school: Miami Northwestern
- College: Pittsburgh (2019–2022)
- NFL draft: 2023: 1st round, 19th overall pick

Career history
- Tampa Bay Buccaneers (2023–present)

Awards and highlights
- Unanimous All-American (2022); ACC Defensive Player of the Year (2022); 2× First-team All-ACC (2021, 2022)

Career NFL statistics as of Week 7, 2026
- Total tackles: 60
- Sacks: 11.5
- Forced fumbles: 1
- Fumble recoveries: 2
- Pass deflections: 1
- Defensive touchdowns: 1
- Stats at Pro Football Reference

Calijah Demetrius Kancey (born March 1, 2001) is an American professional football defensive tackle for the Tampa Bay Buccaneers of the National Football League (NFL). He played college football for the Pittsburgh Panthers, where he was named the 2022 ACC Defensive Football Player of the Year. Kancey was selected by the Buccaneers in the first round of the 2023 NFL draft.

== Early life ==
Kancey attended Miami Northwestern Senior High School in Miami, Florida. Over his final two seasons in high school he had over 200 tackles combined. He committed to the University of Pittsburgh to play college football.

== College career ==
Kancey played in one game his freshman year at Pittsburgh in 2019, the 2019 Quick Lane Bowl, and took a redshirt. In 2020, he played in 11 games and started the final four games of the season. He recorded 27 tackles and 1.5 sacks. As a 14-game starter in 2021, Kancey had 35 tackles and seven sacks and was named a third-team All-American by the Associated Press. He returned to Pittsburgh as a starter in 2022 where he was named a unanimous All-American. He finished the season with 31 tackles, 7.5 sacks, and 14.5 tackles for loss which lead the nation for interior defenders.

== Professional career ==
Pre-draft measurables
Height	Weight	Arm length	Hand span	Wingspan	40-yard dash	10-yard split	20-yard split	20-yard shuttle	Three-cone drill	Vertical jump	Broad jump
6 ft 1 in (1.85 m)	281 lb (127 kg)	30 5/8 in (0.78 m)	9 1/8 in (0.23 m)	6 ft 0 3/4 in (1.85 m)	4.67 s	1.64 s	2.69 s	4.36 s	7.00 s	33.5 in (0.85 m)	9 ft 4 in (2.84 m)
All values from NFL Combine/Pro Day

Kancey was selected by the Tampa Bay Buccaneers in the first round of the 2023 NFL draft with the 19th overall pick. Kancey was named Defensive Rookie of the Month for November of the 2023 season.

After re-aggravating a calf injury during his debut in a week 1, 20–17 win over the Minnesota Vikings, Kancey played his first full NFL game in a week 6, 20–6 loss to the Detroit Lions, during which he recorded six quarterback pressures and his first career sack. He finished his rookie season with four sacks, 26 tackles, and one pass defended.

In his first career playoff game against the Philadelphia Eagles, Kancey recorded four tackles, a sack, a tackle for loss, helped contribute to a safety, and helped contribute to stopping not just one, but two Brotherly Shove attempts in the Buccaneers' Wild Card Round victory. The Buccaneers remain the only team to do so.

In the 2024 season, he recorded 28 tackles (22 solo), 7.5 sacks, one forced fumble, and one fumble recovery in 12 games.

Kancey started Tampa Bay's first two games of the 2025 season, recording one tackle. On September 16, 2025, Kancey was diagnosed with a torn pectoral muscle, and was placed on injured reserve. He was activated on January 2, 2026 after missing 14 games.

On April 27, 2026, the Buccaneers exercised the fifth-year option on Kancey's contract.

== NFL career statistics ==
Legend
**Bold**	Career high

=== Regular season ===
Year	Team	Games		Tackles					Fumbles				Interceptions			
Year	Team	GP	GS	Cmb	Solo	Ast	Sck	TFL	FF	FR	Yds	TD	Int	Yds	TD	PD
2023	TB	14	14	26	19	7	4.0	10	—	—	—	—	—	—	—	1
2024	TB	12	12	28	22	6	7.5	11	1	1	0	0	0	0	0	0
2025	TB	2	2	1	1	0	0.0	1	0	0	0	0	0	0	0	0
Career		28	28	55	42	13	11.5	22	1	1	—	—	—	—	—	1
