= Ikem Ekwonu =

American football player (born 2000)

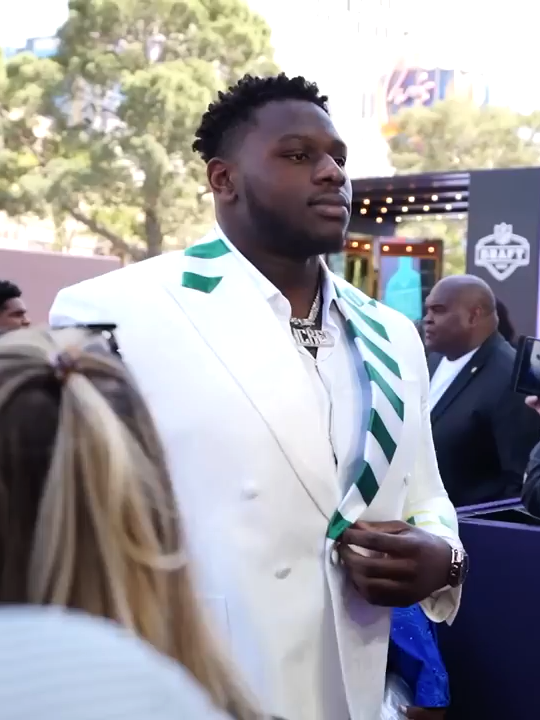
- Ekwonu at the 2022 NFL draft

No. 79 – Carolina Panthers
- Position: Offensive tackle
- Roster status: Physically unable to perform

Personal information
- Born: October 31, 2000 (age 26); Matthews, North Carolina, U.S.
- Listed height: 6 ft 4 in (1.93 m)
- Listed weight: 335 lb (152 kg)

Career information
- High school: Providence Day (Charlotte, North Carolina)
- College: NC State (2019–2021)
- NFL draft: 2022: 1st round, 6th overall pick

Career history
- Carolina Panthers (2022–present)

Awards and highlights
- Unanimous All-American (2021); ACC Jacobs Blocking Trophy (2021); First-team All-ACC (2021); Third-team All-ACC (2020)

Career NFL statistics as of 2025
- Games played: 64
- Games started: 64
- Stats at Pro Football Reference

Ikemefuna Patrick "Ickey" Ekwonu (Note: /ˌiːkɛmˈɛfuːnə (iːˈkɛm) ɛˈkwɔːnuː/ EE-kem-EF-oo-nə "ee-KEM" eh-KWON-oo) (born October 31, 2000) is an American professional football offensive tackle for the Carolina Panthers of the National Football League (NFL). Of Nigerian descent, he played college football for the NC State Wolfpack, earning unanimous All-American honors and winning the Jacobs Blocking Trophy as the best blocker in the Atlantic Coast Conference in 2021. Ekwonu was selected sixth overall by the Carolina Panthers in the 2022 NFL draft.

== Early life ==
Ekwonu grew up in the Charlotte suburb of Matthews, North Carolina, and attended Providence Day School, where he excelled in football while playing both offensive and defensive line.

A 3-star offensive guard recruit, Ekwonu committed to play college football at NC State over offers from Appalachian State, Charlotte, Georgia Tech, Harvard, Maryland, North Carolina, Syracuse, Tennessee, Toledo, Vanderbilt, Virginia, and West Virginia.

== College career ==
Ekwonu started the final seven games of his freshman season at left tackle and led the team with 37 pancake blocks and was named to the Football Writers Association of America Freshman All-America team. He began his sophomore season as the Wolfpack's starting left guard. Ekwonu was moved back to left tackle during the season and again led the Wolfpack with 50 pancake blocks and 22 knockdowns and was named second-team All-Atlantic Coast Conference (ACC) at both guard and tackle by the Associated Press.

Ekwonu was named preseason All-ACC as well as a preseason All-American by Pro Football Focus and Sporting News going into the 2021 season. He was awarded the Jacobs Blocking Trophy as the best blocker in the ACC and was also a unanimous All-American selection.

== Professional career ==
Pre-draft measurables
| Height | Weight | Arm length | Hand span | Wingspan | 40-yard dash | 10-yard split | 20-yard split | 20-yard shuttle | Three-cone drill | Vertical jump | Broad jump | Bench press |
|---|---|---|---|---|---|---|---|---|---|---|---|---|
| 6 ft 4 in (1.93 m) | 310 lb (141 kg) | 34 in (0.86 m) | 10 1/4 in (0.26 m) | 7 ft 0 1/4 in (2.14 m) | 4.93 s | 1.76 s | 2.88 s | 4.73 s | 7.82 s | 29.0 in (0.74 m) | 9 ft 0 in (2.74 m) | 26 reps |
All values from NFL Combine/Pro Day

Following the end of the 2021 season, Ekwonu announced that he would forgo his remaining college eligibility to enter the 2022 NFL draft, where he was selected in the first round with the sixth overall pick by the Carolina Panthers. On May 11, 2022, Ekwonu signed a four-year deal with the Panthers worth $27.6 million featuring a signing bonus of $17.2 million and a fifth year-option. As a rookie, he played in and started all 17 games for the Panthers in the 2022 season. He started in all 17 games in the 2023 season.

On May 1, 2025, the Panthers exercised the fifth-year option on Ekwonu's contract. Ekwonu will receive $17,560,000 for the 2026 season. On January 11, 2026, Ekwonu suffered a ruptured patellar tendon in a 31-34 loss against the Los Angeles Rams, in the wild card round of the 2025-26 NFL playoffs.

== Personal life ==
Ekwonu majored in business administration at NC State. His father was a basketball player from Nigeria, while a twin brother, Osita, plays linebacker for the Notre Dame Fighting Irish. His nickname, Ickey, was given to him by a former coach who noted his resemblance to running back Ickey Woods.
