= Mikel Jones =

American football player (born 2000)

Profile
- Position: Linebacker

Personal information
- Born: October 11, 2000 (age 26); Miami, Florida, U.S.
- Listed height: 6 ft 0 in (1.83 m)
- Listed weight: 226 lb (103 kg)

Career information
- High school: IMG Academy (Bradenton, Florida)
- College: Syracuse (2019–2022)
- NFL draft: 2023: undrafted

Career history
- Los Angeles Chargers (2023)*; Dallas Cowboys (2023)*; DC Defenders (2024); Tennessee Titans (2024)*
- * Offseason or practice squad member only

Awards and highlights
- First-team All-ACC (2021); Third-team All-ACC (2022)
- Stats at Pro Football Reference

Mikel Anthony Jones (born October 11, 2000) is an American professional football linebacker. He played college football for the Syracuse Orange.

== Early life ==
Jones was born on October 11, 2000, in Miami, Florida, and attended Champagnat Catholic School and Mater Academy in (Hialeah Gardens, Florida. In August 2017, Jones transferred to IMG Academy in Bradenton, Florida for his senior year of high school, where he helped lead the IMG Academy Ascenders to a 7-1 record in 2018 and a top-5 national ranking. He was rated a consensus four-star prospect, one of the top 25 outside linebackers in the Class of 2019, and was recruited by Ole Miss, Kentucky, Louisville, Purdue, LSU, and Syracuse, where he ultimately enrolled.

== College career ==
As a true freshman at Syracuse in 2019, Jones played in 12 games with four starts and had 38 tackles. In 2020, he started 11 games and recorded 69 tackles along with four interceptions, the most in the ACC and fifth nationally.

In 2021, Jones was a first-team All-ACC selection. He led the ACC with 60 solo tackles and had 110 total tackles. He also recorded four sacks. Syracuse head coach Dino Babers called him the "quarterback" of the defense for the Orange, as Jones led the team and the conference in solo, assisted and total tackles. After the strong showing in junior season, he was recruited by other programs and explored NFL Draft options, but decided against the jump and returned for another year.

In the 2022 season, Jones was named one of the team captains. He was named to several pre-season All-ACC and All-America teams, as well as watch lists for the Butkus Award, Nagurski Trophy, and Bednarik Award. He was named one of 15 semifinalists for the Butkus Award given to the top linebackers. After Syracuse's surprising 6–0 start, Jones penned an article in the Players' Tribune titled "Syracuse, Why Not Us???".

In December 2022, Jones declared for the 2023 NFL draft, forgoing his final year of eligibility.

== Professional career ==
Pre-draft measurables
Height	Weight	Arm length	Hand span	20-yard shuttle	Three-cone drill	Vertical jump	Broad jump	Bench press
5 ft 11 5/8 in (1.82 m)	229 lb (104 kg)	32 1/2 in (0.83 m)	10 1/4 in (0.26 m)	4.57 s	7.21 s	30.0 in (0.76 m)	9 ft 5 in (2.87 m)	18 reps
All values from Pro Day

=== Los Angeles Chargers ===
Jones signed with the Los Angeles Chargers as an undrafted free agent on April 29, 2023. He was waived on August 29, 2023.

=== Dallas Cowboys ===
On October 3, 2023, Jones was signed to the Dallas Cowboys practice squad. He was released on October 23.

=== DC Defenders ===
On May 28, 2024, Jones signed with the DC Defenders of the United Football League (UFL). His contract was terminated on August 20, 2024, to sign with an NFL team.

=== Tennessee Titans ===
Jones signed with the Tennessee Titans on August 20, 2024 and was waived six days later.
