= Andrew Booth Jr. =

American football player (born 2000)

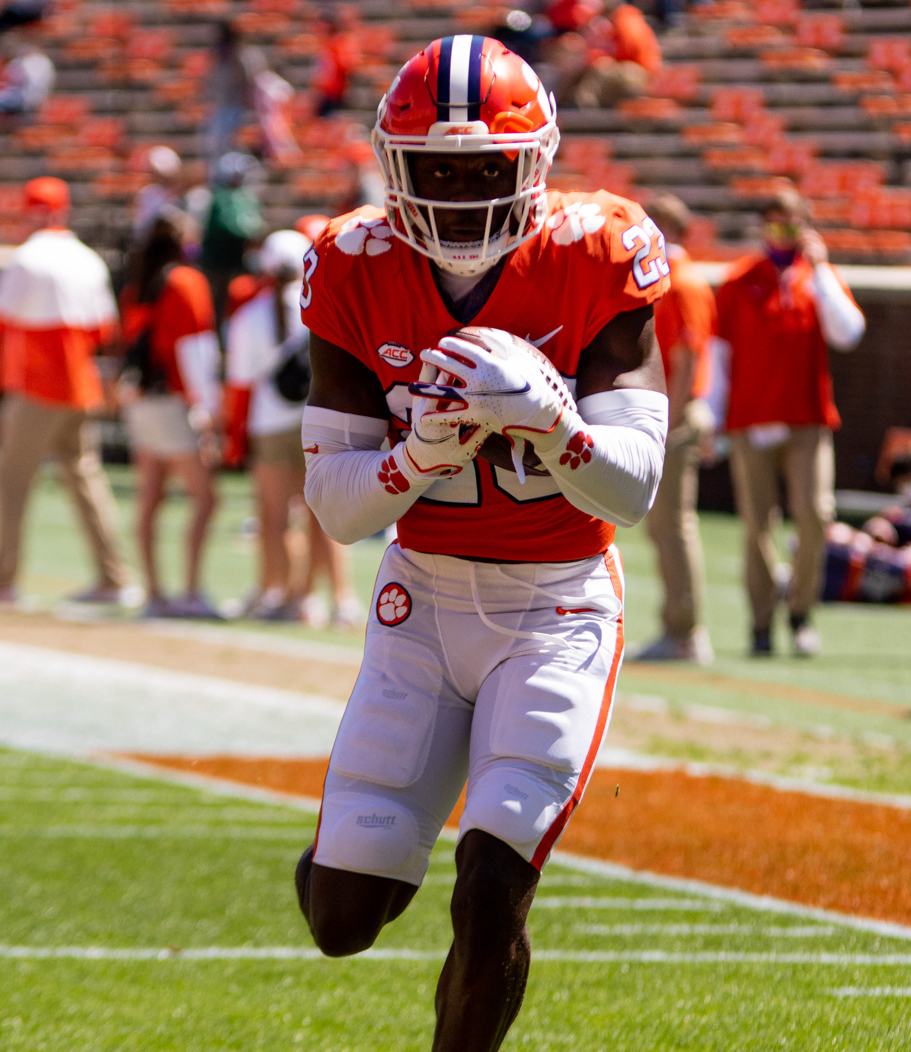
- Booth with the Clemson Tigers in 2021

Profile
- Position: Cornerback

Personal information
- Born: September 28, 2000 (age 26); Dacula, Georgia, U.S.
- Listed height: 6 ft 0 in (1.83 m)
- Listed weight: 194 lb (88 kg)

Career information
- High school: Archer (Lawrenceville, Georgia)
- College: Clemson (2019–2021)
- NFL draft: 2022: 2nd round, 42nd overall pick

Career history
- Minnesota Vikings (2022–2023); Dallas Cowboys (2024)

Awards and highlights
- First-team All-ACC (2021); Second-team All-ACC (2020)

Career NFL statistics
- Total tackles: 35
- Pass deflections: 2
- Stats at Pro Football Reference

Andrew Booth Jr. (born September 28, 2000) is an American professional football cornerback. He played college football for the Clemson Tigers and was selected by the Minnesota Vikings in the second round of the 2022 NFL draft.

== Early life ==
Booth Jr. attended Archer High School in Lawrenceville, Georgia. As a junior, he received all-county, all-region and all-state honors.

As a senior, he received all-state, county defensive back of the year and region specialist of the year honors. He played in the 2019 Under Armour All-America Game. A five-star recruit, he committed to Clemson University to play college football.

He was a three-year starter, finishing with 162 tackles, 13 interceptions, 44 passes defensed, 4 forced fumbles, 22 receptions for 557 yards, 4 touchdowns, 3 punt return touchdowns and one blocked field goal.

== College career ==
Booth Jr. appeared in 13 games as a true freshman in 2019, collecting 6 tackles and one pass defensed.

As a sophomore in 2020, he started four out of 11 games, recording 30 tackles, two interceptions, 4 passes defensed, one sack and a fumble recovery for a 21-yard touchdown. He received ACC Defensive Back of the Week honors, after making 3 tackles, 2 passes defensed and a highlight-reel one-handed interception against the University of Virginia. He had 7 tackles (one for loss) and his first career sack against Georgia Tech.

As a junior in 2021, he started all 11 games, compiling 39 tackles (3 for loss), 3 interceptions (led the team) and 5 passes defensed. He had 9 tackles (one for loss) against Boston College. He had 2 interceptions and one pass defensed against the University of South Carolina. On January 9, 2022, Booth declared for the 2022 NFL draft, forgoing his senior season.

== Professional career ==
Pre-draft measurables
Height	Weight	Arm length	Hand span	Wingspan
6 ft 0 1/4 in (1.84 m)	194 lb (88 kg)	31 1/2 in (0.80 m)	9 3/8 in (0.24 m)	6 ft 4 7/8 in (1.95 m)
All values from NFL Combine

=== Minnesota Vikings ===
Booth was selected by the Minnesota Vikings in the second round with the 42nd overall pick in the 2022 NFL draft. He appeared in 6 games with one start, totaling 12 tackles. He was declared inactive Weeks 2 to 4 with a quad injury. He started in the Week 11 against the Dallas Cowboys and had a game-high 9 tackles. On November 30, 2022, he was placed on the injured reserve list with a knee injury.

In 2023, he appeared in 17 games with one start, tallying eight tackles and one pass defensed. He started in the season-finale against the Detroit Lions.

=== Dallas Cowboys ===
On August 9, 2024, Booth was traded to the Dallas Cowboys in exchange for Nahshon Wright. He was released on November 5 and was signed to the practice squad two days later. Booth was promoted to the active roster on December 21. On August 27, 2025, he was released by the Cowboys.

=== Louisville Kings ===
On January 14, 2026, Booth was selected by the Louisville Kings of the United Football League (UFL).
