= Zach Bako-Bewele =

American football player (born 1999)

No. 50 – Green Bay Packers
- Position: Offensive tackle
- Roster status: Injured reserve

Personal information
- Born: March 26, 1999 (age 27); Baton Rouge, Louisiana, U.S.
- Listed height: 6 ft 4 in (1.93 m)
- Listed weight: 304 lb (138 kg)

Career information
- High school: Catholic (Baton Rouge)
- College: Wake Forest (2017–2021)
- NFL draft: 2022: 4th round, 140th overall pick

Career history
- Green Bay Packers (2022–present)

Awards and highlights
- First-team All-ACC (2021)

Career NFL statistics as of 2026
- Games played: 57
- Games started: 53
- Stats at Pro Football Reference

Zachary Miskom Bako-Bewele (born Zachary Miskom Tom, March 26, 1999) is an American professional football offensive tackle for the Green Bay Packers of the National Football League (NFL). He played college football for the Wake Forest Demon Deacons and was selected by the Packers in the fourth round of the 2022 NFL draft.

== Early life ==
Bako-Bewele was born in Baton Rouge, Louisiana grew up in Prairieville, Louisiana, and attended Catholic High School in Baton Rouge, Louisiana. He is of Nigerian descent.

== College career ==
Bako-Bewele was a member of the Wake Forest Demon Deacons for five seasons and redshirted his true freshman season. He became the team's starting center going into his redshirt sophomore season and was named honorable mention All-Atlantic Coast Conference (ACC) after starting all 13 of Wake Forest's games. Bako-Bewele moved to left tackle the following season and started nine games. He was named first-team All-ACC in 2021.

== Professional career ==
Pre-draft measurables
Height	Weight	Arm length	Hand span	Wingspan	40-yard dash	10-yard split	20-yard split	20-yard shuttle	Three-cone drill	Vertical jump	Broad jump	Bench press
6 ft 4 1/4 in (1.94 m)	304 lb (138 kg)	33 1/4 in (0.84 m)	10 3/8 in (0.26 m)	6 ft 8 3/8 in (2.04 m)	4.94 s	1.63 s	2.83 s	4.47 s	7.32 s	33.0 in (0.84 m)	9 ft 10 in (3.00 m)	24 reps
All values from NFL Combine/Pro Day

Bako-Bewele was drafted by the Green Bay Packers in the fourth round (140th overall) of the 2022 NFL draft. He signed his four-year rookie contract on May 26, 2022. Bako-Bewele saw his first NFL action on September 11, during a Week 1 loss to the Minnesota Vikings, filling in at left guard after starter Jon Runyan Jr. suffered a concussion in the third quarter.

In the 2023 season, Bako-Bewele became the permanent starter at right tackle for the Packers, starting all 17 games.

In April 2024, Bako-Bewele suffered a torn pectoral muscle, causing him to miss part of Green Bay's offseason training program. In the 2024 season, he started all 17 games and scored the sixth-highest grade (85.8) among offensive tackles in the 2024 season per Pro Football Focus.

On July 22, 2025, Bako-Bewele signed a four-year, $88 million contract extension, including a $30.2 million signing bonus. At the time of signing, the bonus was the largest for an offensive lineman in league history.

On September 22, 2026, it was announced that Bako-Bewele suffered a fully torn patellar tendon in the team's Week 2 victory over the New York Jets, necessitating season–ending surgery. He was officially placed on injured reserve on September 28.

== Personal life ==
Bako-Bewele's older brother, Cameron Tom, was also an offensive linemen in the NFL and went to college at The University of Southern Mississippi.

On August 2, 2026, he officially announced that he was changing his last name from "Tom" to "Bako-Bewele," a combination of his paternal grandparents' Nigerian last names. Tom is his father's surname, but his paternal grandfather's given name.
