= Mataeo Durant =

American football player (born 1999)

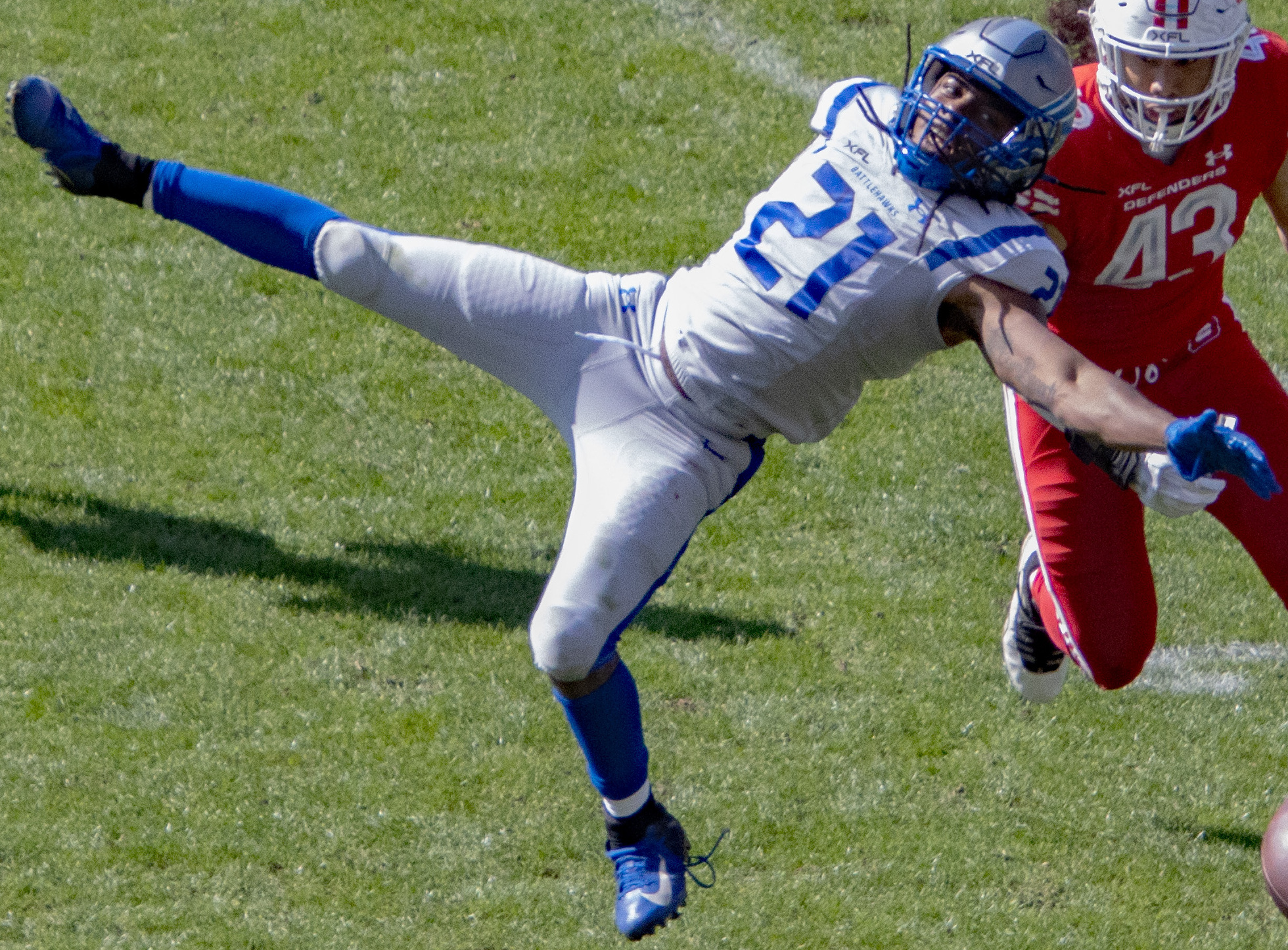
- Durant with the St. Louis BattleHawks in 2023

No. 21
- Position: Running back

Personal information
- Born: December 4, 1999 (age 26); Plum Branch, South Carolina, U.S.
- Listed height: 6 ft 1 in (1.85 m)
- Listed weight: 195 lb (88 kg)

Career information
- High school: McCormick High School (McCormick, South Carolina)
- College: Duke
- NFL draft: 2022: undrafted

Career history
- Pittsburgh Steelers (2022)*; St. Louis Battlehawks (2023–2024)
- * Offseason or practice squad member only

Awards and highlights
- First-team All-ACC (2021)

Mataeo Durant (born December 4, 1999) is an American former professional football running back. He played college football at Duke.

== Early life ==
Durant played high school football at McCormick High School in South Carolina. As a senior in 2017, he gained 768 yards in just four games.

== College career ==
He played college football for the Duke Blue Devils from 2018 to 2021. As a junior in 2020, he rushed for 817 yards and received the team's most valuable player award. As a senior in 2021, he rushed for 1,241 yards and scored 11 touchdowns. His 2021 total set Duke's single-season rushing yardage record.

In December 2021, Durant declared for the 2022 NFL draft.

== Professional career ==
Pre-draft measurables
Height	Weight	Arm length	Hand span	40-yard dash	10-yard split	20-yard split	20-yard shuttle	Three-cone drill	Vertical jump	Broad jump
5 ft 11 3/8 in (1.81 m)	196 lb (89 kg)	31 3/8 in (0.80 m)	9 1/2 in (0.24 m)	4.43 s	1.60 s	2.61 s	4.47 s	7.40 s	35.0 in (0.89 m)	10 ft 7 in (3.23 m)
All values from Pro Day

=== Pittsburgh Steelers ===
After his college career, Durant was signed by the Pittsburgh Steelers as an undrafted free agent on April 30, 2022. He was released on August 23, 2022.

=== St. Louis Battlehawks ===
On November 17, 2022, Durant was drafted by the St. Louis Battlehawks of the XFL. He re-signed with the team on January 31, 2024. He was placed on the team's injured reserve list on April 25. He re-signed with the team again on August 26, 2024.
