= Baylon Spector =

American football player (born 1998)

Profile
- Position: Linebacker

Personal information
- Born: October 20, 1998 (age 28); Calhoun, Georgia, U.S.
- Listed height: 6 ft 0 in (1.83 m)
- Listed weight: 233 lb (106 kg)

Career information
- High school: Calhoun
- College: Clemson (2017–2021)
- NFL draft: 2022: 7th round, 231st overall pick

Career history
- Buffalo Bills (2022–2025); Jacksonville Jaguars (2026)*
- * Offseason or practice squad member only

Awards and highlights
- CFP national champion (2018)

Career NFL statistics as of 2025
- Total tackles: 55
- Sacks: 1.5
- Fumble recoveries: 1
- Stats at Pro Football Reference

Baylon Spector (born October 20, 1998) is an American professional football linebacker. He played college football for the Clemson Tigers. He was drafted by the Buffalo Bills in the seventh round of the 2022 NFL draft.

== College career ==
Spector was a member of the Clemson Tigers for five seasons and redshirted his true freshman season. He was named a starter at weak side linebacker going into his redshirt junior season and was named All-Atlantic Coast Conference by the Associated Press after leading the team with 72 tackles and 4.5 sacks. As a redshirt senior Spector was the Tigers' second-leading tackler with 85. Spector finished his college career with 210 tackles, 22.0 tackles for loss, 9.0 sacks, four forced fumbles, four fumble recoveries, and a one interception in 53 games played with 21 starts.

== Professional career ==
Pre-draft measurables
Height	Weight	Arm length	Hand span	Wingspan	40-yard dash	10-yard split	20-yard split	20-yard shuttle	Three-cone drill	Vertical jump	Broad jump	Bench press
6 ft 0 1/8 in (1.83 m)	233 lb (106 kg)	31 1/2 in (0.80 m)	10 in (0.25 m)	6 ft 3 5/8 in (1.92 m)	4.60 s	1.57 s	2.68 s	4.18 s	6.91 s	36.0 in (0.91 m)	10 ft 2 in (3.10 m)	19 reps
All values from NFL Combine/Pro Day

=== Buffalo Bills ===
The Buffalo Bills selected Spector in the seventh round, 231st overall, of the 2022 NFL draft. He was placed on injured reserve on August 30, 2023. He was activated on October 14.

Spector was waived/injured on August 6, 2025. He was re-signed to the practice squad on October 7. Spector was promoted to the active roster on January 10, 2026.

=== Jacksonville Jaguars ===
On August 17, 2026, Spector was signed by the Jacksonville Jaguars. On August 30, he was released by Jacksonville as a part of final roster cuts.
