= Zion Johnson =

American football player (born 1999)

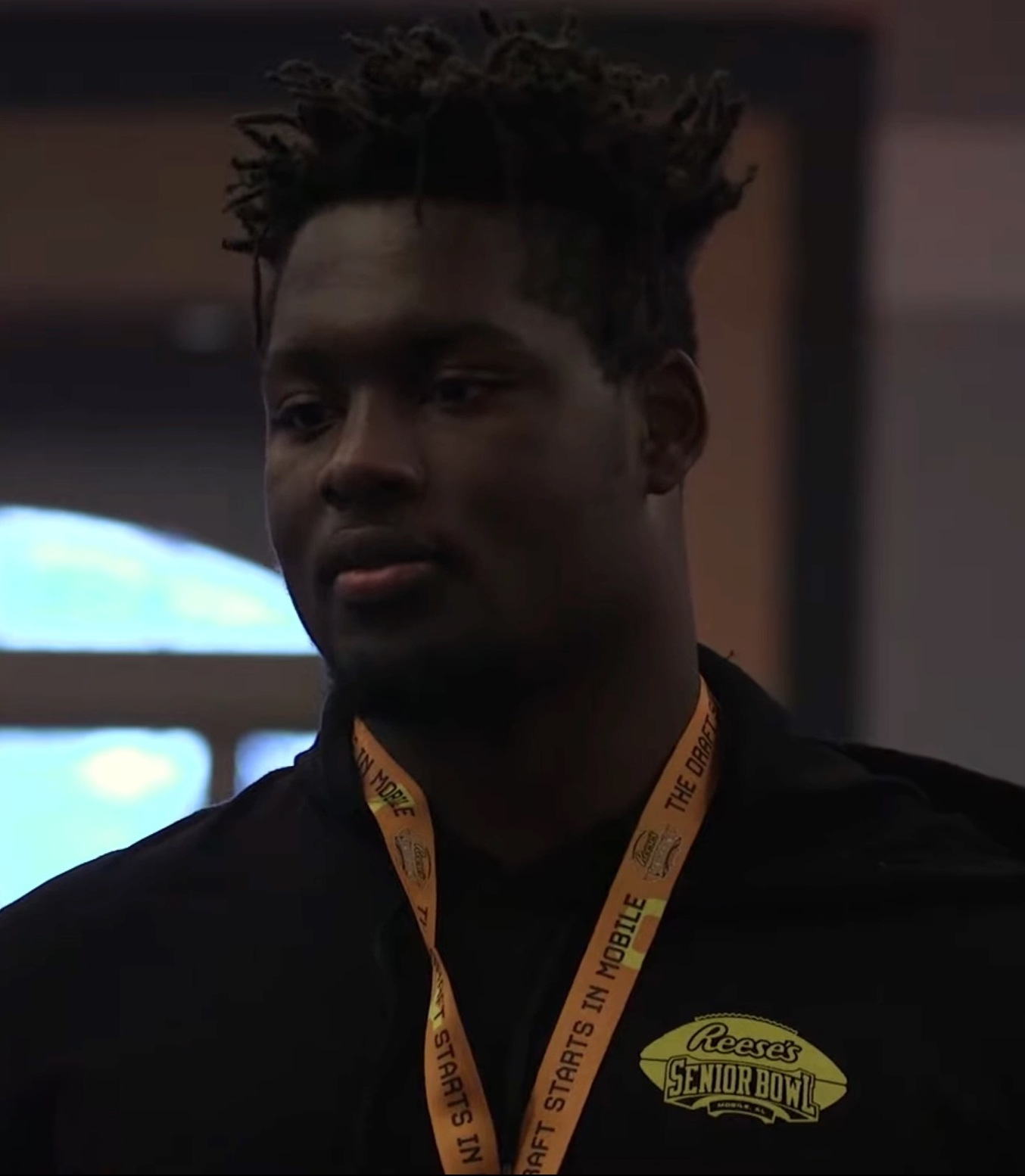
- Johnson at Senior Bowl in 2022

No. 77 – Cleveland Browns
- Position: Guard
- Roster status: Active

Personal information
- Born: November 18, 1999 (age 26); Bowie, Maryland, U.S.
- Listed height: 6 ft 3 in (1.91 m)
- Listed weight: 315 lb (143 kg)

Career information
- High school: Riverdale Baptist (Upper Marlboro, Maryland)
- College: Davidson (2017–2018); Boston College (2019–2021)
- NFL draft: 2022: 1st round, 17th overall pick

Career history
- Los Angeles Chargers (2022–2025); Cleveland Browns (2026–present)

Awards and highlights
- PFWA All-Rookie Team (2022); First-team All-American (2021); First-team All-ACC (2021); First-team All-PFL (2018); Second-team All-ACC (2019); Third-team All-ACC (2020)

Career NFL statistics as of Week 10, 2026
- Games played: 76
- Games started: 75
- Stats at Pro Football Reference

Zion Johnson (born November 18, 1999) is an American professional football guard for the Cleveland Browns of the National Football League (NFL). He played college football for the Davidson Wildcats before transferring to the Boston College Eagles, where he was named an All-American in 2021. Johnson was selected by the Chargers in the first round of the 2022 NFL draft.

== Early life ==
Johnson was born on November 18, 1999, and grew up in Bowie, Maryland, before attending Riverdale Baptist School in Upper Marlboro, Maryland. Before playing football, Johnson played golf. While in high school and college, he was a pathways intern at the National Institutes of Health.

== College career ==
Johnson began his collegiate career at Davidson College. He played in all 22 of the Wildcats' games with 19 starts over two seasons and was named first team All-Pioneer Football League as a sophomore. Johnson transferred to Boston College following his sophomore year. Johnson said "Boston College for me was a no-brainer" and that he chose it because the school was renowned academically.

Johnson started seven games at left guard in his first season at Boston College and was named second team All-Atlantic Coast Conference (ACC) after he was named the conference Offensive Lineman of the Week three times. He was moved to left tackle before his senior season and was named third team All-ACC after starting all 11 of the Eagles' games. After considering entering the 2021 NFL Draft, Johnson decided to utilize the extra year of eligibility granted to college athletes who played in the 2020 season due to the Covid-19 pandemic and return to Boston College for a fifth season He moved back to the guard position for his final season and was named first team All-ACC and a first team All-American by the Walter Camp Football Foundation.

== Professional career ==
Pre-draft measurables
Height	Weight	Arm length	Hand span	Wingspan	40-yard dash	10-yard split	20-yard split	20-yard shuttle	Three-cone drill	Vertical jump	Broad jump	Bench press
6 ft 2 5/8 in (1.90 m)	312 lb (142 kg)	34 in (0.86 m)	10 5/8 in (0.27 m)	6 ft 10 3/8 in (2.09 m)	5.18 s	1.74 s	2.97 s	4.46 s	7.38 s	32.0 in (0.81 m)	9 ft 4 in (2.84 m)	32 reps
All values from NFL Combine

=== Los Angeles Chargers ===
Johnson was selected in the first round with the 17th overall pick by the Los Angeles Chargers in the 2022 NFL draft. He was named the Chargers starting right guard as a rookie, starting all 17 games. He was named to the PFWA All-Rookie Team. In his second season, he was moved to left guard, his natural position in college. He appeared in and started 15 games in the 2023 season. In the 2024 season, he appeared in and started all 17 games.

=== Cleveland Browns ===
On March 11, 2026, Johnson signed a three-year, $49.5 million contract with the Cleveland Browns.
