= 2020 Georgia Tech Yellow Jackets football team =

American college football season

2020 Georgia Tech Yellow Jackets football
- Conference: Atlantic Coast Conference
- Record: 3–7 (3–6 ACC)
- Head coach: Geoff Collins (2nd season)
- Offensive coordinator: Dave Patenaude (2nd season)
- Offensive scheme: Pro spread
- Defensive coordinator: Andrew Thacker (2nd season)
- Co-defensive coordinator: Nathan Burton (2nd season)
- Base defense: Multiple
- Home stadium: Bobby Dodd Stadium

Uniform
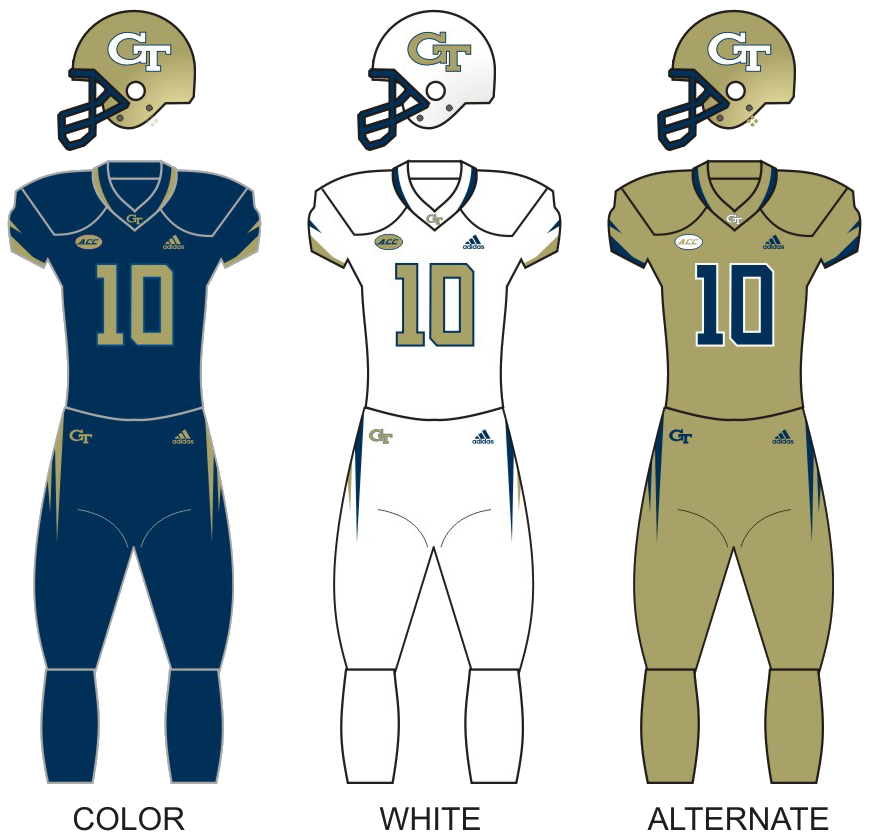

2020 Atlantic Coast Conference football standings
| | Conf. | | | Overall |
| Team | W | | L | W | | L |
|---|---|---|---|---|---|---|
| No. 5 Notre Dame y^ | 9 | – | 0 | 10 | – | 2 |
| No. 3 Clemson y$^ | 8 | – | 1 | 10 | – | 2 |
| No. 22 Miami (FL) | 7 | – | 2 | 8 | – | 3 |
| No. 18 North Carolina | 7 | – | 3 | 8 | – | 4 |
| NC State | 7 | – | 3 | 8 | – | 4 |
| Boston College | 5 | – | 5 | 6 | – | 5 |
| Pittsburgh | 5 | – | 5 | 6 | – | 5 |
| Virginia Tech | 5 | – | 5 | 5 | – | 6 |
| Virginia | 4 | – | 5 | 5 | – | 5 |
| Wake Forest | 3 | – | 4 | 4 | – | 5 |
| Georgia Tech | 3 | – | 6 | 3 | – | 7 |
| Louisville | 3 | – | 7 | 4 | – | 7 |
| Florida State | 2 | – | 6 | 3 | – | 6 |
| Duke | 1 | – | 9 | 2 | – | 9 |
| Syracuse | 1 | – | 9 | 1 | – | 10 |
Championship: Clemson 34, Notre Dame 10
^ – College Football Playoff participant; $ – Conference champion; y – Championship game participant; Rankings from AP Poll.

The 2020 Georgia Tech Yellow Jackets football team represented the Georgia Institute of Technology during the 2020 NCAA Division I FBS football season. The Yellow Jackets were led by second-year head coach Geoff Collins. They played their home games at Bobby Dodd Stadium and competed as a member of the Atlantic Coast Conference (ACC).

After finishing their season with a 3–7 record (3–6 in ACC play), the Yellow Jackets determined that they would not consider a bowl bid (the NCAA waived bowl eligibility requirements for the 2020–21 bowl season).

== Preseason ==
=== Death of Bryce Gowdy ===
On December 30, 2019, Georgia Tech signee Bryce Gowdy, from Deerfield Beach, Florida, committed suicide by walking in front of a freight train. He died aged 17 and had received a full scholarship to play football at Georgia Tech, having signed on December 18.

== Schedule ==
=== Spring game ===
The Yellow Jackets held spring practices until early March, when the outbreak of the COVID-19 pandemic forced the suspension of all NCAA activities. The Georgia Tech football spring game was scheduled to take place in Atlanta, GA on April 10, 2020, but was also canceled.

=== Regular schedule ===
Georgia Tech had games scheduled against Gardner–Webb and Georgia, which were canceled due to the COVID-19 pandemic. This became the first season since 1924 that the Yellow Jackets do not play Georgia.

| Date | Time | Opponent | Site | TV | Result | Attendance |
|---|---|---|---|---|---|---|
| September 12 | 4:00 p.m. | at Florida State | Doak Campbell Stadium; Tallahassee, FL | ABC | W 16–13 | 17,538 |
| September 19 | 3:30 p.m. | No. 14 UCF* | Bobby Dodd Stadium; Atlanta, GA | ABC | L 21–49 | 11,000 |
| September 26 | 11:00 a.m. | at Syracuse | Carrier Dome; Syracuse, NY | ACCRSN | L 20–37 | 0 (Behind closed doors) |
| October 9 | 7:00 p.m. | Louisville | Bobby Dodd Stadium; Atlanta, GA | ESPN | W 46–27 | 11,000 |
| October 17 | 12:00 p.m. | No. 1 Clemson | Bobby Dodd Stadium; Atlanta, GA (rivalry) | ABC | L 7–73 | 11,000 |
| October 24 | 4:00 p.m. | at Boston College | Alumni Stadium; Chestnut Hill, MA | ACCN | L 27–48 | 0 (Behind closed doors) |
| October 31 | 3:30 p.m. | No. 4 Notre Dame | Bobby Dodd Stadium; Atlanta, GA (rivalry) | ABC | L 13–31 | 11,000 |
| November 28 | 7:00 p.m. | Duke | Bobby Dodd Stadium; Atlanta, GA | ACCRSN | W 56–33 | 11,000 |
| December 5 | 4:00 p.m. | at NC State | Carter–Finley Stadium; Raleigh, NC | ACCN | L 13–23 | 4,032 |
| December 10 | 7:00 p.m. | Pittsburgh | Bobby Dodd Stadium; Atlanta, GA | ACCRSN | L 20–34 | 11,000 |
*Non-conference game; Rankings from AP Poll and CFP Rankings after November 24 released prior to game; All times are in Eastern time

The ACC released their schedule on July 29, with specific dates selected at a later date.

| Date | Opponent | Site | Result |
|---|---|---|---|
| September 3 | at Clemson | Bobby Dodd Stadium; Atlanta, GA | |
| September 12 | Gardner-Webb* | Bobby Dodd Stadium; Atlanta, GA | |
| September 18 | UCF | Bobby Dodd Stadium; Atlanta, GA | |
| September 26 | UNC | Kenan Memorial Stadium; Chapel Hill, NC | |
| October 3 | VPISU | Lane Stadium; Blacksburg, VA (rivalry) | |
| October 17 | Virginia | Bobby Dodd Stadium; Atlanta, GA | |
| October 24 | Pitt | Heinz Field; Pittsburgh, PA | |
| October 31 | Syracuse | Carrier Dome; Syracuse, NY | |
| November 7 | Duke | Bobby Dodd Stadium; Atlanta, GA | |
| November 14 | Notre Dame | Mecerdes-Benz Stadium; Atlanta, GA | |
| November 21 | Miami | Bobby Dodd Stadium; Atlanta, GA | |
| November 28 | Georgia | Dooley Field at Sanford Stadium; Athens, GA | |
*Non-conference game; Rankings from AP Poll and CFP Rankings after November 24 released prior to game

The above is the original schedule planned for 2020 before changes were made due to the coronavirus pandemic. (needs to be completed)

== Game summaries ==
=== At Florida State ===
Georgia Tech Yellow Jackets (0–0) vs. Florida State Seminoles (0–0)

| Quarter | 1 | 2 | 3 | 4 | Total |
|---|---|---|---|---|---|
| Georgia Tech | 0 | 0 | 7 | 9 | 16 |
| Florida State | 10 | 0 | 3 | 0 | 13 |

at Doak Campbell Stadium • Tallahassee, FL

- Date: Saturday, September 12, 2020
- Game time: 4:00 p.m. EDT
- Game weather: partly cloudy • Temperature: 82°F
- Game attendance: 17,538
- TV announcers (ABC/ESPN2): Joe Tessitore, Greg McElroy, Katie George

Game information

First Quarter

Second Quarter

Third Quarter

Fourth Quarter

| Statistics | GT | FSU |
|---|---|---|
| First downs | 24 | 21 |
| Total yards | 438 | 307 |
| Rushes/yards | 161 | 109 |
| Passing yards | 277 | 198 |
| Passing: Comp–Att–Int | 24–35–2 | 23–45–1 |
| Time of possession | 29:28 | 30:32 |

| Team | Category | Player | Statistics |
|---|---|---|---|
| Georgia Tech | Passing | Jeff Sims | 24–35, 277 yds, 1 TD, 2 INT |
| Georgia Tech | Rushing | Jeff Sims | 13 carries, 64 yds |
| Georgia Tech | Receiving | Malachi Carter | 6 receptions, 66 yds, 1 TD |
| Florida State | Passing | James Blackman | 23–43, 198 yds, 1 TD, 1 INT |
| Florida State | Rushing | Jordan Travis | 6 carries, 39 yds |
| Florida State | Receiving | Jashaun Corbin | 8 receptions, 55 yds |

=== vs UCF ===
#14 UCF Knights (1–0) vs. Georgia Tech Yellow Jackets (1–0)

| Quarter | 1 | 2 | 3 | 4 | Total |
|---|---|---|---|---|---|
| #14 UCF | 7 | 21 | 0 | 21 | 49 |
| Georgia Tech | 7 | 7 | 0 | 7 | 21 |

at Bobby Dodd Stadium • Atlanta, GA

- Date: Saturday, September 19, 2020
- Game time: 2:30 p.m. EDT
- Game weather: • Temperature:
- TV announcers (ABC): Joe Tessitore, Greg McElroy, Marty Smith

Game information

First Quarter

Second Quarter

Third Quarter

Fourth Quarter

| Statistics | UCF | GT |
|---|---|---|
| First downs | 31 | 23 |
| Total yards | 660 | 471 |
| Rushes/yards | 243 | 227 |
| Passing yards | 417 | 244 |
| Passing: Comp–Att–Int | 27–41–1 | 18–37–2 |
| Time of possession | 31:52 | 28:08 |

| Team | Category | Player | Statistics |
|---|---|---|---|
| UCF | Passing | Dillon Gabriel | 27/41, 417 yds, 4 TD, 1 INT |
| UCF | Rushing | Otis Anderson Jr. | 18 carries, 88 yds, 1 TD |
| UCF | Receiving | Marlon Williams | 10 receptions, 154 yds, 2 TD |
| Georgia Tech | Passing | Jeff Sims | 18/36, 224 yds, 1 TD, 2 INT |
| Georgia Tech | Rushing | Jeff Sims | 16 carries, 82 yds, 1 TD |
| Georgia Tech | Receiving | Jahmyr Gibbs | 4 receptions, 60 yds, 1 TD |

=== At Syracuse ===
Georgia Tech Yellow Jackets (1–1) vs. Syracuse Orange (0–2)

| Quarter | 1 | 2 | 3 | 4 | Total |
|---|---|---|---|---|---|
| Georgia Tech | 0 | 13 | 7 | 0 | 20 |
| Syracuse | 17 | 6 | 7 | 7 | 37 |

at Carrier Dome • Syracuse, NY

- Date: Saturday, September 26, 2020
- Game time: 11:00 a.m. EDT
- Game weather: indoor
- TV announcers (ESPN3/ACC Network): Tom Werme, James Bates, Lyndsay Rowley

Game information

First Quarter

Second Quarter

Third Quarter

Fourth Quarter

| Statistics | GT | SYR |
|---|---|---|
| First downs | 23 | 14 |
| Total yards | 453 | 357 |
| Rushes/yards | 52/275 | 41/163 |
| Passing yards | 178 | 194 |
| Passing: Comp–Att–Int | 15–32–4 | 13–24–1 |
| Time of possession | 34:08 | 25:52 |

| Team | Category | Player | Statistics |
|---|---|---|---|
| Georgia Tech | Passing | Jeff Sims | 13/28, 174 yds, 1 TD, 4 INT |
| Georgia Tech | Rushing | Jahmyr Gibbs | 18 carries, 105 yds |
| Georgia Tech | Receiving | Malachi Carter | 4 receptions, 47 yds |
| Syracuse | Passing | Tommy DeVito | 13/24, 194 yds, 2 TD, 1 INT |
| Syracuse | Rushing | Sean Tucker | 24 carries, 112 yds, 2 TD |
| Syracuse | Receiving | Nykeim Johnson | 4 receptions, 87 yds, 1 TD |

=== vs Louisville ===
Louisville Cardinals (1–2) vs. Georgia Tech Yellow Jackets (1–2)

| Quarter | 1 | 2 | 3 | 4 | Total |
|---|---|---|---|---|---|
| Louisville | 7 | 14 | 6 | 0 | 27 |
| Georgia Tech | 7 | 7 | 12 | 20 | 46 |

at Bobby Dodd Stadium • Atlanta, GA

- Date: Friday, October 9, 2020
- Game time: 6:00 p.m. EDT
- Game weather: • Temperature:
- TV announcers (ESPN): Jason Benetti, Andre Ware, Eric Wood

Game information

First Quarter

Second Quarter

Third Quarter

Fourth Quarter

| Statistics | LOU | GT |
|---|---|---|
| First downs | 24 | 19 |
| Total yards | 471 | 450 |
| Rushes/yards | 48/242 | 34/192 |
| Passing yards | 229 | 258 |
| Passing: Comp–Att–Int | 19–33–0 | 12–22–0 |
| Time of possession | 36:38 | 23:22 |

| Team | Category | Player | Statistics |
|---|---|---|---|
| Louisville | Passing | Malik Cunningham | 19/33, 229 yds, 2 TD |
| Louisville | Rushing | Javian Hawkins | 26 carries, 155 yds |
| Louisville | Receiving | Marshon Ford | 5 receptions, 89 yds, 1 TD |
| Georgia Tech | Passing | Jeff Sims | 11/21, 249 yds, 2 TD |
| Georgia Tech | Rushing | Jeff Sims | 7 carries, 64 yds, 1 TD |
| Georgia Tech | Receiving | Malachi Carter | 3 receptions, 89 yds, 1 TD |

=== vs Clemson ===
Clemson Tigers (4–0) vs. Georgia Tech Yellow Jackets (2–2)

| Quarter | 1 | 2 | 3 | 4 | Total |
|---|---|---|---|---|---|
| No. 1 Clemson | 17 | 35 | 7 | 14 | 73 |
| Georgia Tech | 7 | 0 | 0 | 0 | 7 |

at Bobby Dodd Stadium • Atlanta, GA

- Date: Saturday, October 17, 2020
- Game time: 12:00 p.m. EDT
- Game weather: Sunny • Temperature: 74 °F (23 °C) • Wind: Calm
- Game attendance: 11,000
- Referee: Stuart Mullins
- TV announcers (ABC): Bob Wischusen (play-by-play), Dan Orlovsky (color), and Marty Smith (sideline)

Game information

First Quarter

- (7:55) CLEM TD – Trevor Lawrence 5 yard pass to Cornell Powell, (B. T. Potter PAT)
- (6:32) GT TD – Jeff Sims 59 yard pass to Jalen Camp, (Jude Kelly PAT)
- (6:14) CLEM TD – Trevor Lawrence 83 yard pass to Amari Rodgers, (B. T. Potter PAT)
- (4:03) CLEM FG – B. T. Potter 30 yard field goal

Second Quarter

- (12:43) CLEM TD – Trevor Lawrence 34 yard pass to Davis Allen, (B. T. Potter PAT)
- (7:05) CLEM TD – Nyles Pinckney 1 yard run, (B. T. Potter PAT)
- (3:14) CLEM TD – Trevor Lawrence 8 yard pass to Frank Ladson Jr., (B. T. Potter PAT)
- (2:10) CLEM TD – Travis Etienne 3 yard run, (B. T. Potter PAT)
- (0:16) CLEM TD – Trevor Lawrence 16 yard pass to Amari Rodgers, (B. T. Potter PAT)

Third Quarter

- (8:21) CLEM TD – Chez Mellusi 5 yard run, (B. T. Potter PAT)

Fourth Quarter

- (11:38) CLEM TD – Hunter Helms 7 yard pass to Kobe Pace, (Aidan Swanson PAT)
- (7:41) CLEM TD – Hunter Helms 35 yard pass to Ajou Ajou, (Aidan Swanson PAT)

| Statistics | CLEM | GT |
|---|---|---|
| First downs | 29 | 7 |
| Total yards | 671 | 204 |
| Rushes/yards | 39/171 | 44/123 |
| Passing yards | 500 | 81 |
| Passing: Comp–Att–Int | 33–49–1 | 6–14–1 |
| Time of possession | 35:53 | 24:07 |

| Team | Category | Player | Statistics |
|---|---|---|---|
| Clemson | Passing | Trevor Lawrence | 24/32, 404 yds, 5 TD, 1 INT |
| Clemson | Rushing | Travis Etienne | 11 carries, 44 yds, 1 TD |
| Clemson | Receiving | Amari Rodgers | 6 receptions, 161 yds, 2 TD |
| Georgia Tech | Passing | Jeff Sims | 6/13, 81 yds, 1 TD, 1 INT |
| Georgia Tech | Rushing | Jahmyr Gibbs | 15 carries, 67 yds |
| Georgia Tech | Receiving | Jalen Camp | 1 reception, 59 yds, 1 TD |

=== At Boston College ===
Georgia Tech Yellow Jackets (2–3) vs. Boston College Eagles (3–2)

| Quarter | 1 | 2 | 3 | 4 | Total |
|---|---|---|---|---|---|
| Georgia Tech | 0 | 14 | 7 | 6 | 27 |
| Boston College | 14 | 20 | 14 | 0 | 48 |

at Alumni Stadium • Chestnut Hill, MA

- Date: Saturday, October 24, 2020
- Game time: 4:00 EDT
- Game weather: • Temperature:
- TV announcers (ACC Network): Chris Cotter, Mark Herzlich, Kelsey Riggs

Game information

First Quarter

Second Quarter

Third Quarter

Fourth Quarter

| Statistics | GT | BC |
|---|---|---|
| First downs | 19 | 23 |
| Total yards | 362 | 409 |
| Rushes/yards | 33/106 | 44/264 |
| Passing yards | 256 | 145 |
| Passing: Comp–Att–Int | 18–32–1 | 13–21–0 |
| Time of possession | 26:39 | 33:21 |

| Team | Category | Player | Statistics |
|---|---|---|---|
| Georgia Tech | Passing | Jeff Sims | 12/18, 171 yds, 2 TD, 1 INT |
| Georgia Tech | Rushing | Jeff Sims | 12 carries, 47 yds, 1 TD |
| Georgia Tech | Receiving | Ahmarean Brown | 4 receptions, 75 yds, 1 TD |
| Boston College | Passing | Phil Jurkovec | 13/21, 145 yds, 2 TD |
| Boston College | Rushing | Phil Jurkovec | 7 carries, 94 yds |
| Boston College | Receiving | C. J. Lewis | 4 receptions, 58 yds, 2 TD |

=== vs No. 4 Notre Dame ===
No. 4 Notre Dame Fighting Irish (5–0) vs. Georgia Tech Yellow Jackets (2–4)

| Quarter | 1 | 2 | 3 | 4 | Total |
|---|---|---|---|---|---|
| No. 4 Notre Dame | 7 | 10 | 7 | 7 | 31 |
| Georgia Tech | 0 | 7 | 0 | 6 | 13 |

at Bobby Dodd Stadium • Atlanta, GA

- Date: Saturday, October 31, 2020
- Game time: 3:30 EDT
- Game weather: Cool and Sunny • Temperature: 61 °F (16 °C) • Wind: Breezy
- Game attendance: 11,000
- Referee: Gary Patterson
- TV announcers (ESPNews/ABC): Dave Pasch, Mike Golic Sr., Marty Smith

Game information

First Quarter

- (6:16) ND – Joe Wilkins Jr. 8-yard pass from Ian Book, Jonathan Doerer kick (Drive: 15 plays, 81 yards, 8:38; Notre Dame 7-0)

Second Quarter

- (14:42) GT – Zamari Walton 93-yard fumble return, Jude Kelley kick (Tied 7-7)
- (10:47) ND – Kyren Williams 2-yard run, Jonathan Doerer kick (Drive: 7 plays, 75 yards, 3:48; Notre Dame 14-7)
- (1:49) ND – Jonathan Doerer 32-yard field goal (Drive: 8 plays, 35 yards, 2:10; Notre Dame 17-7)

Third Quarter

- (10:43) ND – Kyren Williams 4-yard run, Jonathan Doerer kick (Drive: 6 plays, 65 yards, 2:56; Notre Dame 24-7)

Fourth Quarter

- (12:59) ND – C'Bo Flemister 3-yard run, Jonathan Doerer kick (Drive: 9 plays, 74 yards, 4:32; Notre Dame 31-7)
- (7:15) GT – Jordan Mason 1-yard run, Adonicas Sanders rush failed (Drive: 8 plays, 69 yards, 2:42; Notre Dame 31-13)

| Statistics | ND | GT |
|---|---|---|
| First downs | 24 | 17 |
| Total yards | 426 | 238 |
| Rushes/yards | 44/227 | 33/88 |
| Passing yards | 199 | 150 |
| Passing: Comp–Att–Int | 18–26–0 | 15–26–0 |
| Time of possession | 36:54 | 23:06 |

| Team | Category | Player | Statistics |
|---|---|---|---|
| Notre Dame | Passing | Ian Book | 18/26, 199 yds, 1 TD |
| Notre Dame | Rushing | Kyren Williams | 15 carries, 76 yds, 2 TD |
| Notre Dame | Receiving | Javon McKinley | 5 receptions, 93 yds |
| Georgia Tech | Passing | Jeff Sims | 15/26, 150 yds |
| Georgia Tech | Rushing | Jahmyr Gibbs | 14 carries, 61 yds |
| Georgia Tech | Receiving | Jalen Camp | 3 receptions, 64 yds |

=== vs Duke ===
Duke Blue Devils (2–6) vs. Georgia Tech Yellow Jackets (2–5)

| Quarter | 1 | 2 | 3 | 4 | Total |
|---|---|---|---|---|---|
| Duke | 7 | 19 | 7 | 0 | 33 |
| Georgia Tech | 14 | 14 | 14 | 14 | 56 |

at Bobby Dodd Stadium • Atlanta, GA

- Date: Saturday, November 28, 2020
- Game time: 7:00 EST
- Game weather: • Temperature:
- TV announcers (ACC Network): Tom Werme, James Bates, Lyndsay Rowley

Game information

First Quarter

Second Quarter

Third Quarter

Fourth Quarter

| Statistics | DUKE | GT |
|---|---|---|
| First downs | 23 | 23 |
| Total yards | 382 | 523 |
| Rushes/yards | 40/68 | 48/377 |
| Passing yards | 314 | 146 |
| Passing: Comp–Att–Int | 23–47–1 | 13–23–1 |
| Time of possession | 32:03 | 27:57 |

| Team | Category | Player | Statistics |
|---|---|---|---|
| Duke | Passing | Chase Brice | 19/40, 273 yds, 2 TD, 1 INT |
| Duke | Rushing | Deon Jackson | 9 carries, 54 yds |
| Duke | Receiving | Dennis Smith | 2 receptions, 57 yds |
| Georgia Tech | Passing | Jeff Sims | 13/23, 146 yds, 3 TD, 1 INT |
| Georgia Tech | Rushing | Jeff Sims | 12 carries, 108 yds |
| Georgia Tech | Receiving | Jahmyr Gibbs | 4 receptions, 48 yds |

=== At NC State ===
Georgia Tech Yellow Jackets (3–5) vs. NC State Wolfpack (7–3)

| Quarter | 1 | 2 | 3 | 4 | Total |
|---|---|---|---|---|---|
| Georgia Tech | 0 | 7 | 3 | 3 | 13 |
| NC State | 3 | 17 | 0 | 3 | 23 |

at Carter-Finley Stadium • Raleigh, NC

- Date: Saturday, December 5, 2020
- Game time: 4:00 p.m. EST
- Game weather: Clear • Temperature: 52 °F (11 °C) • Wind: 10 mph (16 km/h)
- Game attendance: 4,032
- Referee: Riley Johnson
- TV announcers (ACCN): Chris Cotter, Mark Herzlich, and Eric Wood

Game information

First Quarter

- (5:19) NCSU FG – Christopher Dunn 42 yard field goal

Second Quarter

- (14:52) NCSU TD – Ricky Person Jr. 20 yard run (Christopher Dunn PAT)
- (12:20) GT TD – Jeff Sims 34 yard run (Stewart PAT)
- (10:12) NCSU TD – Zonovan Knight 5 yard run (Christopher Dunn PAT)
- (3:53) NCSU FG – Christopher Dunn 20 yard field goal

Third Quarter

- (8:53) GT FG – Gavin Stewart 26 yard field goal

Fourth Quarter

- (11:32) GT FG – Gavin Stewart 22 yard field goal
- (3:31) NCSU FG – Christopher Dunn 39 yard field goal

| Statistics | GT | NCST |
|---|---|---|
| First downs | 23 | 34 |
| Total yards | 412 | 397 |
| Rushes/yards | 51/265 | 32/88 |
| Passing yards | 151 | 309 |
| Passing: Comp–Att–Int | 13–27–0 | 23–36–0 |
| Time of possession | 31:53 | 28:07 |

| Team | Category | Player | Statistics |
|---|---|---|---|
| Georgia Tech | Passing | Jeff Sims | 13/27, 151 yds |
| Georgia Tech | Rushing | Jordan Mason | 21 carries, 99 yds |
| Georgia Tech | Receiving | Adonicas Sanders | 7 receptions, 105 yds |
| NC State | Passing | Bailey Hockman | 23/36, 309 yds |
| NC State | Rushing | Ricky Person Jr. | 15 carries, 59 yds, 1 TD |
| NC State | Receiving | Emeka Emezie | 6 receptions, 91 yds |

=== vs Pittsburgh ===
Pittsburgh Panthers (5–5) vs. Georgia Tech Yellow Jackets (3–6)

| Quarter | 1 | 2 | 3 | 4 | Total |
|---|---|---|---|---|---|
| Pittsburgh | 3 | 13 | 7 | 11 | 34 |
| Georgia Tech | 7 | 0 | 6 | 7 | 20 |

at Bobby Dodd Stadium • Atlanta, GA

- Date: Thursday, December 10, 2020
- Game time: 7:00 EST
- Game weather: • Temperature:
- TV announcers (ACC Network): Tom Werme, James Bates, Abby LaBar

Game information

First Quarter

Second Quarter

Third Quarter

Fourth Quarter

| Statistics | PITT | GT |
|---|---|---|
| First downs | 28 | 21 |
| Total yards | 513 | 348 |
| Rushes/yards | 54/317 | 29/98 |
| Passing yards | 196 | 250 |
| Passing: Comp–Att–Int | 17–34–1 | 19–36–2 |
| Time of possession | 37:51 | 22:09 |

| Team | Category | Player | Statistics |
|---|---|---|---|
| Pittsburgh | Passing | Kenny Pickett | 17/34, 196 yds, 1 TD, 1 INT |
| Pittsburgh | Rushing | Vincent Davis | 25 carries, 247 yds, 1 TD |
| Pittsburgh | Receiving | D. J. Turner | 5 receptions, 82 yds, 1 TD |
| Georgia Tech | Passing | Jeff Sims | 17/31, 238 yds, 2 TD, 2 INT |
| Georgia Tech | Rushing | Jamious Griffin | 5 carries, 43 yds |
| Georgia Tech | Receiving | Jalen Camp | 5 receptions, 97 yds, 1 TD |

== Coaching staff ==
| Coach | Title | Year at Georgia Tech | Previous job |
|---|---|---|---|
| Geoff Collins | Head Coach | 2nd | Temple (HC) |
| Brent Key | AHC/RGC/OL | 2nd | Alabama (OL) |
| Dave Patenaude | OC/QB | 2nd | Temple (OC/QB) |
| Andrew Thacker | DC/LB | 2nd | Temple (DC/LB) |
| Nathan Burton | Co-DC/S | 2nd | Temple (DB) |
| Tashard Choice | RB | 2nd | North Texas (RB) |
| Marco Coleman | DE/OLB | 2nd | Oakland Raiders (DL) |
| Kerry Dixon | WR | 2nd | Toledo (RB) |
| Larry Knight | DL | 2nd | Temple (OLB) |
| Jeff Popovich | CB/DST | 2nd | Boise State (CB) |
| Chris Wiesehan | TE/OST | 2nd | Temple (OL/RGC) |
| Jason Semore | DA | 2nd | Temple (SDA) |

== Rankings ==
Ranking movements Legend: ██ Increase in ranking ██ Decrease in ranking — = Not ranked RV = Received votes
| | Week | | | | | | | | | | | | | | | |
| Poll | Pre | 1 | 2 | 3 | 4 | 5 | 6 | 7 | 8 | 9 | 10 | 11 | 12 | 13 | 14 | Final |
|---|---|---|---|---|---|---|---|---|---|---|---|---|---|---|---|---|
| AP | — | | RV | — | | | | | | | | | | | | |
| Coaches | — | | RV | — | — | | | | | | | | | | | |
| CFP | Not released | | | | | | | | | | | | | | | Not released |

== Players drafted into the NFL ==
| Round | Pick | Player | Position | NFL club |
|---|---|---|---|---|
| 6 | 209 | Jalen Camp | WR | Jacksonville Jaguars |
| 7 | 254 | Pressley Harvin III | P | Pittsburgh Steelers |
