= 2022 Georgia Tech Yellow Jackets football team =

American college football season

2022 Georgia Tech Yellow Jackets football
- Conference: Atlantic Coast Conference
- Record: 5–7 (4–4 ACC)
- Head coach: Geoff Collins (4th season; first four games); Brent Key (interim; remainder of season)
- Offensive coordinator: Chip Long (1st season)
- Offensive scheme: Spread
- Defensive coordinator: Andrew Thacker (4th season)
- Base defense: Multiple
- Home stadium: Bobby Dodd Stadium

Uniform
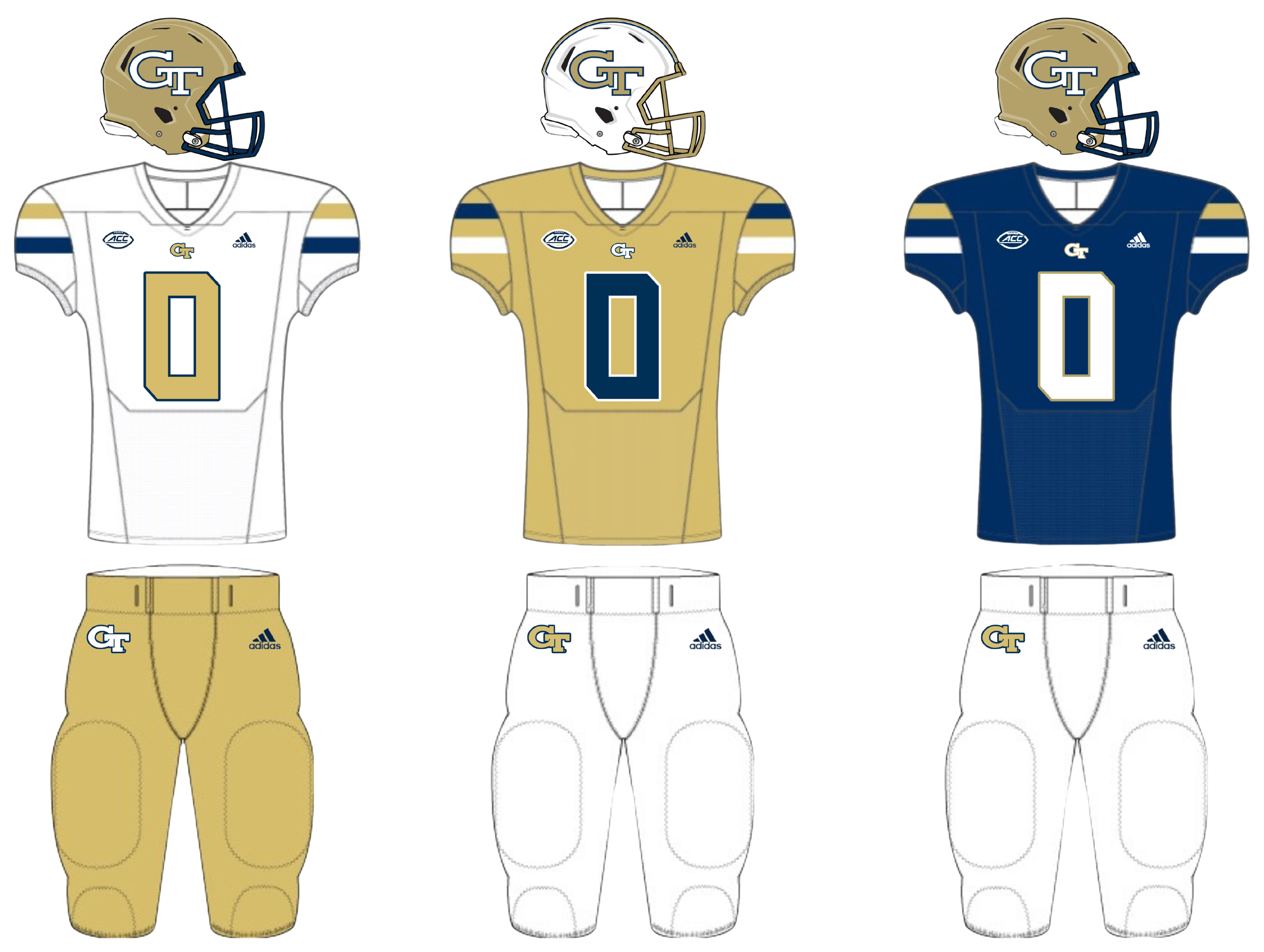

2022 Atlantic Coast Conference football standings
	Conf.			Overall
Team	W		L	W		L
Atlantic Division
No. 13 Clemson xy$	8	–	0	11	–	3
No. 11 Florida State	5	–	3	10	–	3
Louisville	4	–	4	8	–	5
NC State	4	–	4	8	–	5
Syracuse	4	–	4	7	–	6
Wake Forest	3	–	5	8	–	5
Boston College	2	–	6	3	–	9
Coastal Division
North Carolina xy	6	–	2	9	–	5
Duke	5	–	3	9	–	4
No. 22 Pittsburgh	5	–	3	9	–	4
Georgia Tech	4	–	4	5	–	7
Miami (FL)	3	–	5	5	–	7
Virginia	1	–	6	3	–	7
Virginia Tech	1	–	6	3	–	8
Championship: Clemson 39, North Carolina 10
$ – Conference champion; x – Division champion/co-champions; y – Championship game participant; Rankings from AP Poll

The 2022 Georgia Tech Yellow Jackets football team represented the Georgia Institute of Technology during the 2022 NCAA Division I FBS football season. The Yellow Jackets played their home games at Bobby Dodd Stadium in Atlanta, Georgia, and competed as members of the Atlantic Coast Conference. They were led by Geoff Collins until his firing early in the season and then were subsequently led by interim coach Brent Key.

== Offseason ==
Georgia Tech had a tumultuous offseason. After an embarrassing 3–9 record in 2021, Geoff Collins made changes to his staff on both sides of the ball. Brought in were Chip Long as offensive coordinator, Del Alexander as wide receivers coach, Mike Daniels as running backs coach, Chris Weinke as quarterbacks coach, David Turner as defensive run game coordinator, and Travares Tillman as defensive backs coach.

=== New uniforms ===
On July 18 the Yellow Jackets revealed a refreshed uniform set. The uniforms were made in partnership with Adidas who has provided Tech with uniforms and apparel since 2018. The uniforms are more traditional than the previous set, with design elements taken from previous Yellow Jacket football uniforms. There are three jerseys, white, navy, and a gold alternate. The white tops feature gold numbers with a thin navy outline, which is reminiscent of uniforms worn in the late 90s and early 00s. The navy tops have white numerals with a gold outline, which is different from the previous set that featured gold numbers with no outline. The navy uniforms appear to be a call back to the uniforms Tech wore from 1987 to 1995 which are remembered for winning the 1990 National Championship. The third jersey Tech introduced is gold with navy blue numbers. Tech has worn gold tops from time to time since the late 60's. It is unapparent if they will be paired with a white helmet or Tech's traditional gold helmet. The jerseys will feature numbers on the shoulders for the first time since 2017. The uniforms have three pant options in the same colors. The bottoms feature a stripe design that Tech used on its pants from 1987 to 2007. Tech revealed the uniforms with videos featuring voiceovers from past legends Joe Hamilton and Darren Waller.

=== Death of Demaryius Thomas ===
Georgia Tech faithful mourned the loss of former star wide receiver Demaryius Thomas who died on December 9, 2021, at age 33. Thomas played at Tech from 2006 through 2009 and was First-team All-ACC his redshirt junior year. After college Thomas had a lengthy NFL career. His most notable time in the league was with the Denver Broncos where he was a 4x Pro Bowler and made Second-team All-Pro twice. Thomas also won Super Bowl 50 with Denver. Thomas was affectionately nicknamed “Bay Bay”. He was given the nickname by his uncle in reference to the bad kids from the movie Bebe's Kids. Thomas's celebration of life was held at McCamish Pavilion on December 20. Friends, former teammates, and fans attended the event.

On April 27, 2022, Georgia Tech and the PeyBack Foundation, which is run by Thomas's former teammate Peyton Manning announced the Demaryius A. Thomas Scholarship Endowment. The Demaryius A. Thomas Scholarship Endowment endows academic scholarships to attend Georgia Tech for incoming freshmen students from Laurens County, Georgia, Thomas's hometown. In addition to this, Georgia Tech announced that August 8 would be annually recognized as “Demaryius Thomas Day”.

== Coaching change ==
On September 26, 2022, following the team's 3rd loss of the season in 4 games, Coach Geoff Collins and Athletics Director Todd Stansbury were relieved of their duties. Former Georgia Tech football alum Brent Key was named as interim coach.

== Schedule ==
Georgia Tech announced its 2022 football schedule on February 1, 2022. The 2022 schedule consisted of five home games, six away games and a neutral-site game in the regular season. The Yellow Jackets hosted ACC foes Duke, Virginia, and Miami and traveled to Pitt, Florida State, Virginia Tech and North Carolina. They played Clemson in a neutral-site game at the Mercedes-Benz Stadium in Atlanta, Georgia.

The Yellow Jackets hosted two of their non-conference opponents, Western Carolina from the Division I FCS and Ole Miss from the SEC. They visited UCF from the AAC and Georgia from the SEC.

Sports Illustrated ranked Georgia Tech's schedule the 18th most difficult for the 2022 NCAA college football season.

Date	Time	Opponent	Site	TV	Result	Attendance
September 5	8:00 p.m.	vs. No. 4 Clemson	Mercedes-Benz Stadium; Atlanta, GA (Chick-fil-A Kickoff, rivalry)	ESPN	L 10–41	47,712
September 10	7:00 p.m.	Western Carolina*	Bobby Dodd Stadium; Atlanta, GA	ACCNX/ESPN+	W 35–17	36,486
September 17	3:30 p.m.	No. 20 Ole Miss*	Bobby Dodd Stadium; Atlanta, GA	ABC	L 0–42	40,293
September 24	4:00 p.m.	at UCF*	FBC Mortgage Stadium; Orlando, FL	ESPNU	L 10–27	44,220
October 1	8:00 p.m.	at No. 24 Pittsburgh	Acrisure Stadium; Pittsburgh, PA	ACCN	W 26–21	46,972
October 8	4:00 p.m.	Duke^{†}	Bobby Dodd Stadium; Atlanta, GA	ACCRSN	W 23–20 ^{OT}	32,041
October 20	7:30 p.m.	Virginia	Bobby Dodd Stadium; Atlanta, GA	ESPN	L 9–16	29,362
October 29	12:00 p.m.	at Florida State	Doak Campbell Stadium; Tallahassee, FL	ACCN	L 16–41	61,007
November 5	12:30 p.m.	at Virginia Tech	Lane Stadium; Blacksburg, VA (rivalry)	ACCRSN	W 28–27	62,843
November 12	3:30 p.m.	Miami (FL)	Bobby Dodd Stadium; Atlanta, GA	ACCRSN	L 14–35	33,857
November 19	5:30 p.m.	at No. 13 North Carolina	Kenan Memorial Stadium; Chapel Hill, NC	ESPN2	W 21–17	44,940
November 26	12:00 p.m.	at No. 1 Georgia*	Sanford Stadium; Athens, GA (Clean, Old-Fashioned Hate)	ESPN	L 14–37	92,746
*Non-conference game; ^{†}Homecoming; Rankings from AP Poll released prior to the game; All times are in Eastern time

== Game summaries ==
=== vs No. 4 Clemson ===
No. 4 Clemson Tigers vs Georgia Tech Yellow Jackets − Game summary

Quarter	1	2	3	4	Total
Georgia Tech	0	3	7	0	10
No. 4 Clemson	0	14	10	17	41

at Mercedes-Benz Stadium • Atlanta, GA

- Date: September 5, 2022
- Game time: 8:00 p.m.
- Game weather: n/a (game played indoors)
- Game attendance: 47,712
- Referee: Marcus Woods
- TV announcers (ESPN): Dave Pasch (play-by-play), Dusty Dvoracek (color), and Tom Luginbill (sideline)

Game information

First quarter

- None

Second quarter

- CLEM – Will Shipley 1 yard run, (B. T. Potter PAT), 9:53. Tigers 7–0. Drive: 4 plays, 5 yards, 2:10.
- CLEM – DJ Uiagalelei 6 yard pass to Beaux Collins, (Potter PAT), 3:52. Tigers 14–0. Drive: 8 plays, 67 yards, 2:49.'
- GT – Jude Kelly 45 yard field goal, 1:15. Tigers 14–3. Drive: 9 plays, 47 yards, 1:15.

Third quarter

- GT – Jeff Sims 13 yard pass to EJ Jenkins, (Kelly PAT), 9:47. Tigers 14–10. Drive: 9 plays, 57 yards, 4:29.
- CLEM – Potter 29 yard field goal, 5:41. Tigers 17–10. Drive: 12 plays, 63 yards, 4:06.
- CLEM – Uiagalelei 9 yard run, (Potter PAT), 1:18. Tigers 24–10. Drive: 9 plays, 74 yards, 1:18.

Fourth quarter

- CLEM – Potter 31 yard field goal, 2:14. Tigers 27–10. Drive: 6 plays, 26 yards, 2:14.
- CLEM – Shipley 3 yard run, (Potter PAT), 6:27. Tigers 34–10. Drive: 4 plays, 15 yards, 1:03.
- CLEM – Cade Klubnik 3 yard pass to Will Taylor, (Robert Gunn III PAT), 1:35. Tigers 41–10. Drive: 10 plays, 66 yards, 3:40.

Top passers

- CLEM – DJ Uiagalelei: 19–32, 209 yards, 1 TD
- GT – Jeff Sims: 23–36, 164 yards, 1 TD, 1 INT

Top rushers

- CLEM – Will Shipley: 10 rushes, 42 yards, 2 TDs
- GT – Jeff Sims: 13 rushes, 41 yards

Top Receiving

- CLEM – Beaux Collins: 3 receptions, 54 yards, 1 TD
- GT – Nate McCollum: 6 receptions, 55 yards

=== Western Carolina ===
Western Carolina Catamounts vs Georgia Tech Yellow Jackets − Game summary

Quarter	1	2	3	4	Total
Western Carolina	14	0	0	3	17
Georgia Tech	14	14	7	0	35

at Bobby Dodd Stadium • Atlanta, GA

- Date: September 10, 2022
- Game time: 7:30 p.m.
- TV announcers (ACCNX/ESPN+): John Schriffen (play-by-play), Rene Ingoglia (color), and Jalyn Johnson (sideline)

Game information

First quarter
Second quarter
Third quarter
Fourth quarter

Top passers

- WCU – Carlos Davis – 18/27, 233 yards, 2 TD, 2 INT
- GT – Jeff Sims – 8/17, 100 yards, INT

Top rushers

- WCU – Desmond Reid – 10 carries, 47 yards
- GT – Dontae Smith – 11 carries, 102 yards, 3 TD

Top receivers

- WCU – Desmond Reid – 4 receptions, 65 yards
- GT – Malachi Carter – 2 receptions, 22 yards

=== #20 Ole Miss ===
Ole Miss Rebels vs Georgia Tech Yellow Jackets − Game summary

Quarter	1	2	3	4	Total
#20 Ole Miss	14	7	21	0	42
Georgia Tech	0	0	0	0	0

at Bobby Dodd Stadium • Atlanta, GA

- Date: September 17, 2022
- Game time: 3:30 p.m.
- Game weather: Sunny • Temperature: 83 °F (28 °C)
- Game attendance: 40,293
- Referee: Riley Johnson
- TV announcers (ABC): Dave Pasch (play-by-play), Dusty Dvoracek (color), and Tom Luginbill (sideline)

Game information

First Quarter

- (13:34) Ole Miss – Zach Evans 3 yard run (Jonathan Cruz kick). Ole Miss 7–0; 5 plays, 74 yards, 1:21
- (9:51) Ole Miss – Quinshon Judkins 7 yard run (Jonathan Cruz kick). Ole Miss 14–0; 6 plays, 20 yards, 1:49

Second Quarter

- (5:36) Ole Miss – Zach Evans 26 yard run (Jonathan Cruz kick). Ole Miss 21–0; 6 plays, 77 yards, 1:58

Third Quarter

- (8:51) Ole Miss – Quinshon Judkins 1 yard run (Jonathan Cruz kick). Ole Miss 28–0; 8 plays, 63 yards, 3:18
- (5:20) Ole Miss – Ulysses Bentley IV 15 yard run (Jonathan Cruz kick). Ole Miss 35–0; 7 plays, 69 yards, 2:12
- (0:02) Ole Miss – Ulysses Bentley IV 1 yard run (Jonathan Cruz kick). Ole Miss 42–0; 12 plays, 68 yards, 4:00

Fourth Quarter

- No scoring plays

Top passers

- OLE – Jaxson Dart – 10/16, 207 yards, INT
- GT – Jeff Sims – 18/32, 161 yards

Top rushers

- OLE – Zach Evans – 18 carries, 134 yards, 2 TD
- GT – Hassan Hall – 8 carries, 27 yards

Top receivers

- OLE – Malik Heath – 4 receptions, 78 yards
- GT – Malik Rutherford – 4 receptions, 52 yards

=== At UCF ===
Georgia Tech Yellow Jackets at UCF Knights− Game summary

Quarter	1	2	3	4	Total
Georgia Tech	0	7	3	0	10
UCF	3	10	3	11	27

at FBC Mortgage Stadium • Orlando

- Date: September 24, 2022
- Game time: 2:00 p.m.
- TV announcers (ESPNU): Kevin Brown (play-by-play) and Hutson Mason (color)

=== At #24 Pitt ===
Georgia Tech Yellow Jackets at #24 Pittsburgh Panthers− Game summary

Quarter	1	2	3	4	Total
Georgia Tech	3	3	3	17	26
#24 Pitt	0	7	0	14	21

at Acrisure Stadium • Pittsburgh

- Date: October 1, 2022
- Game time: 8:00 p.m.
- Game weather: Temperature: 55 °F (13 °C) • Wind: N at 9 miles per hour (14 km/h) • Weather: Rain
- Game attendance: 46,972
- Referee: Gary Patterson
- TV announcers (ACCN): Wes Durham (play-by-play), Roddy Jones (color), and Taylor Davis (sideline)

=== Duke ===
Duke Blue Devils vs Georgia Tech Yellow Jackets − Game summary

Quarter	1	2	3	4	OT	Total
Duke	0	3	3	14	0	20
Georgia Tech	3	7	7	3	3	23

at Bobby Dodd Stadium • Atlanta, GA

- Date: October 8, 2022
- Game time: 4:00 p.m.
- TV announcers (ACCRSN): Tom Werme (play-by-play), James Bates (color), and Lyndsay Rowley (sideline)

=== Virginia ===
Virginia Cavaliers vs Georgia Tech Yellow Jackets − Game summary

Quarter	1	2	3	4	Total
Virginia	7	6	3	0	16
Georgia Tech	6	3	0	0	9

at Bobby Dodd Stadium • Atlanta, GA

- Date: October 20, 2022
- Game time: 7:30 p.m.
- TV announcers (ESPN): Matt Barrie (play-by-play), Louis Riddick (color), and Harry Lyles, Jr. (sideline)

=== At Florida State ===
Georgia Tech Yellow Jackets at Florida State Seminoles − Game summary

Quarter	1	2	3	4	Total
Georgia Tech	3	0	7	6	16
Florida State	7	17	7	10	41

at Doak Campbell Stadium • Tallahassee, FL

- Date: October 29
- Game time: 12:00 p.m.
- TV announcers (ACC Network): Chris Cotter (play-by-play), Mark Herzlich (color), and Jalyn Johnson (sideline)

=== At Virginia Tech ===
Georgia Tech Yellow Jackets at Virginia Tech Hokies − Game summary

Quarter	1	2	3	4	Total
Georgia Tech	10	3	3	12	28
Virginia Tech	0	20	7	0	27

at Lane Stadium • Blacksburg, VA

- Date: November 5
- Game time: 12:30 p.m.
- Game weather: rainy • Temperature: 65 °F (18 °C)
- Game attendance: 62,844
- Referee: Stuart Mullins
- TV announcers (ACCRSN): Tom Werme (play-by-play), James Bates (color), and Wiley Ballard (sideline)

Game information

First Quarter

- (8:13) GT – Dontae Smith 29 yd Rush (Gavin Stewart Kick) (Drive: 7 plays, 70 yards, 2:20; GT 7–0)
- (1:22) GT - Gavin Stewart 19 yd Field Goal (Drive: 10 plays, 74 yards, 4:41; GT 10-0)

Second Quarter

- (10:15) VT – Grant Wells 3 yd Rush (William Ross Kick) (Drive: 6 plays, 50 yards, 1:53; GT 10–7)
- (3:51) VT - Keshawn King 1 yd Rush (Drive: 8 plays, 43 yards, 2:57; VT 13-10)
- (0:50) VT - Tucker Holloway 90 yd Punt Return (William Ross Kick) (VT 20-10)
- (0:00) GT - Gavin Stewart 27 yd Field Goal (Drive: 8 plays, 65 yards, 0:50; VT 20-13)

Third Quarter

- (7:56) GT - Gavin Stewart 22 yd Field Goal (Drive: 10 plays, 57 yards, 5:38; VT 20-16)
- (4:03) VT - Keli Lawson 7 yd Interception Return (William Ross Kick) (VT 27-16)

Fourth Quarter

- (9:02) GT – Nate McCollum 56 yd Pass From Zach Pyron (Drive: 5 plays, 90 yards, 1:36; VT 27–22)
- (3:30) GT - Zach Pyron 9 yd Rush (Drive: 9 plays, 73 yards, 3:24; GT 28-27)

Top passers

- GT – Zach Pyron – 19/32, 253 yards, TD
- VT – Grant Wells – 14/25, 164 yards

Top rushers

- GT – Dontae Smith – 9 carries, 85 yards, TD
- VT – Keshawn King – 13 carries, 79 yards, TD

Top receivers

- GT – Nate McCollum – 7 receptions, 103 yards, TD
- VT – Kaleb Smith – 4 receptions, 78 yards

=== Miami (FL) ===
Miami Hurricanes vs Georgia Tech Yellow Jackets − Game summary

Quarter	1	2	3	4	Total
Miami (FL)	7	7	0	21	35
Georgia Tech	0	7	0	7	14

at Bobby Dodd Stadium • Atlanta, GA

- Date: November 12, 2022
- Game time: 3:30 p.m.
- Game weather: Clear • Temperature: 62 °F (17 °C)
- Game attendance: 33,857
- Referee: Mike Roche
- TV announcers (ACCRSN): Tom Werme (play-by-play), James Bates (color), and Wiley Ballard (sideline)

Game information

First quarter

- (8:44) MIA – Will Mallory 22-yard pass from Jacurri Brown, Andres Borregales kick (Drive: 11 plays, 75 yards, 6:16; Miami 7–0)

Second quarter

- (9:26) MIA – Jaleel Skinner 4-yard pass from Jacurri Brown, Andres Borregales kick (Drive: 14 plays, 93 yards, 7:31; Miami 14–0)
- (0:30) GT – Nate McCollum 9-yard pass from Zach Pyron, Gavin Stewart kick (Drive: 15 plays, 99 yards, 4:19; Miami 14–7)

Third quarter

- No scoring plays

Fourth quarter

- (7:52) MIA – Colbie Young 8-yard pass from Jacurri Brown, Andres Borregales kick (Drive: 8 plays, 51 yards, 3:54; Miami 21–7)
- (4:29) MIA – Jaylan Knighton 2-yard run, Andres Borregales kick (Drive: 4 plays, 34 yards, 1:44; Miami 28–7)
- (2:36) MIA – Kamren Kinchens 99-yard interception return, Andres Borregales kick (Miami 35–7)
- (0:36) GT – Jamie Felix 7-yard pass from Zach Gibson, Gavin Stewart kick (Drive: 13 plays, 71 yards, 1:56; Miami 35–14)

Top passers

- MIA – Jacurri Brown – 14/19, 136 yards, 3 TD
- GT – Zach Gibson – 12/21, 120 yards, TD, 2 INT

Top rushers

- MIA – Jaylan Knighton – 16 carries, 118 yards, TD
- GT – Zach Pyron – 8 carries, 66 yards

Top receivers

- MIA – Frank Ladson Jr. – 2 receptions, 42 yards
- GT – Nate McCollum – 8 receptions, 101 yards, TD

=== At No. 13 North Carolina ===
Georgia Tech Yellow Jackets at North Carolina Tar Heels − Game summary

Quarter	1	2	3	4	Total
Georgia Tech	0	7	7	7	21
No. 13 North Carolina	7	10	0	0	17

at Kenan Memorial Stadium • Chapel Hill, NC

- Date: November 19
- Game time: 5:30 p.m.
- Game weather: Clear • Temperature: 48 °F (9 °C) • Wind: SW 5 miles per hour (8.0 km/h)
- Game attendance: 44,940
- Referee: Jerry Magallanes
- TV announcers (ESPN2): Beth Mowins (play–by–play), Kirk Morrison (color), and Stormy Buonantony (sideline)

Game information

First quarter

- (10:56) UNC – Elijah Green 80-yard run, Noah Burnette kick (Drive: 1 play, 80 yards, 0:12; North Carolina 7–0)

Second quarter

- (10:51) UNC – Noah Burnette 31-yard field goal (Drive: 16 plays, 45 yards, 7:17; North Carolina 10–0)
- (3:13) UNC – Elijah Green 1-yard run, Noah Burnette kick (Drive: 4 plays, 55 yards, 0:55; North Carolina 17–0)
- (0:48) GT – Dontae Smith 2-yard run, Gavin Stewart kick (Drive: 9 plays, 84 yards, 2:20; North Carolina 17–7)

Third quarter

- (7:31) GT – Taisun Phommachanh 4-yard run, Gavin Stewart kick (Drive: 9 plays, 68 yards, 4:59; North Carolina 17–14)

Fourth quarter

- (11:08) GT – Hassan Hall 6-yard run, Gavin Stewart kick (Drive: 9 plays, 81 yards, 5:07; Georgia Tech 21–17)

Top passers

- GT – Zach Gibson – 13/18, 174 yards
- UNC – Drake Maye – 16/30, 202 yards, INT

Top rushers

- GT – Hassan Hall – 14 carries, 47 yards, TD
- UNC – Elijah Green – 10 carries, 92 yards, 2 TD

Top receivers

- GT – Malik Rutherford – 6 receptions, 68 yards
- UNC – Bryson Nesbit – 4 receptions, 85 yards

=== At No. 1 Georgia ===
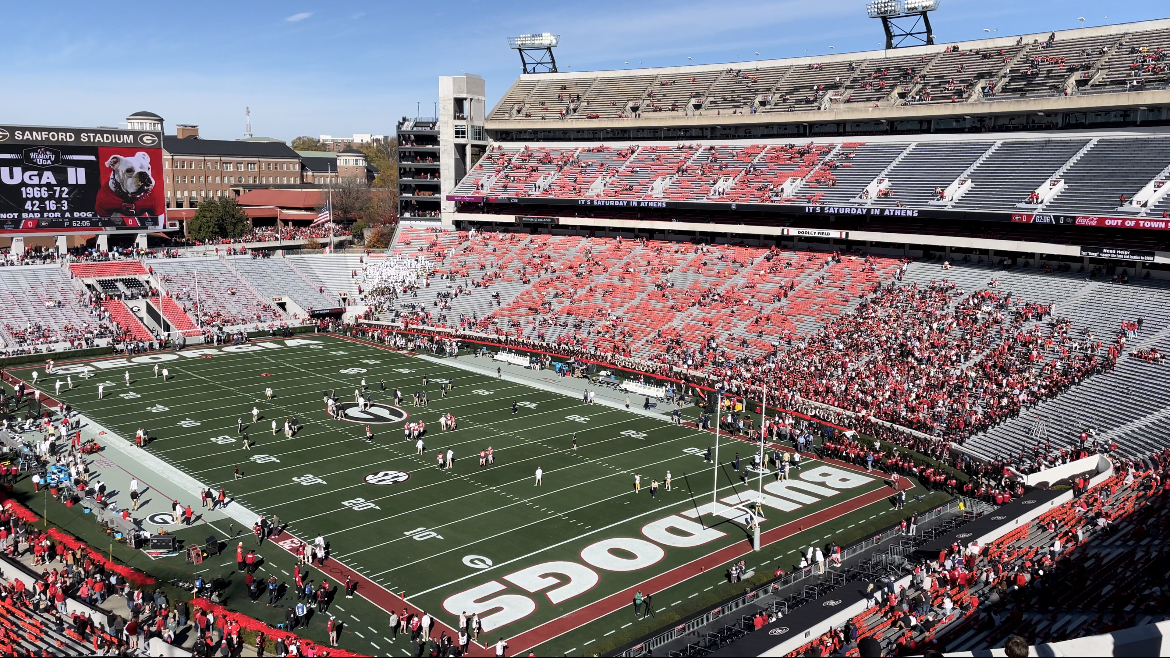
Sanford Stadium on November 26, 2022

Georgia Tech Yellow Jackets at Georgia Bulldogs − Game summary

Quarter	1	2	3	4	Total
Georgia Tech	7	0	0	7	14
No. 1 Georgia	3	7	13	14	37

at Sanford Stadium • Athens, GA

- Date: November 26
- Game time: 12:00 p.m.
- Game weather: Sunny • Temperature: 62 °F (17 °C) • Wind: E 8 miles per hour (13 km/h)
- Game attendance: 92,746
- Referee: Lee Hedrick
- TV announcers (ESPN): Bob Wischusen (play-by-play), Dan Orlovsky (color), and Kris Budden (sideline)

Game information

First quarter

- (10:43) GT – Taisun Phommachanh 7 Yd Run (Gavin Stewart Kick) (Georgia Tech 7–0)
- (0:18) UGA – Jack Podlesny 30 Yd Field Goal (Georgia Tech 7-3)

Second quarter

- (7:59) UGA – Marcus Rosemy-Jacksaint 5 Yd pass from Stetson Bennett (Jack Podlesny Kick) (Georgia 10–7)

Third quarter

- (10:40) UGA – Jack Podlesny 50 Yd Field Goal (Georgia 13-7)
- (5:51) UGA - Brock Bowers 1 Yd pass from Stetson Bennett (Jack Podlesny Kick) (Georgia 20-7)
- (4:11) UGA - Jack Podlesny 36 Yd Field Goal (Georgia 23-7)

Fourth quarter

- (13:45) UGA - Kenny McIntosh 2 Yd Run (Jack Podlesny Kick) (Georgia 30-7)
- (11:13) UGA - Kendall Milton 44 Yd Run (Jack Podlesny Kick) (Georgia 37-7)
- (2:55) GT - Malachi Carter 24 Yd pass from Dontae Smith (Gavin Stewart Kick) (Georgia 37-14)

Top passers

- GT – Zach Gibson – 19/35, 191 yards
- UGA – Stetson Bennett – 10/18, 140 yards, 2 TD

Top rushers

- GT – Dontae Smith – 10 carries, 34 yards
- UGA – Kenny McIntosh – 12 carries, 86 yards, TD

Top receivers

- GT – Nate McCollum – 6 receptions, 65 yards
- UGA – Kenny McIntosh – 2 receptions, 96 yards

== Coaching staff ==
Coach	Title	Year at Georgia Tech	Previous job
Geoff Collins	Head Coach	4th	Temple (HC)
Brent Key	AHC/RGC/OL	4th	Alabama (OL)
David Turner	AHC/RGC	1st	Florida (DL)
Chip Long	OC/TE	1st	Tulane (OC/QB)
Andrew Thacker	DC/LB	4th	Temple (DC/LB)
Travares Tillman	DB/DPGC	1st	Michigan State (CB)
Del Alexander	WR	1st	Notre Dame (WR)
Mike Daniels	RB	1st	Buffalo (RB)
Larry Knight	DL	4th	Temple (OLB)
Jason Semore	LB	3rd	Valdosta State (DC)
Chris Weinke	QB	1st	Tennessee (QB)

== Rankings ==
Ranking movements Legend: ██ Increase in ranking ██ Decrease in ranking — = Not ranked RV = Received votes
	Week															
Poll	Pre	1	2	3	4	5	6	7	8	9	10	11	12	13	14	Final
AP	—	—	—	—	—	—	—	—	—	—	—	—	—	—	—	—
Coaches	—	—	—	—	—	—	—	—	—	—	—	—	—	RV	—	—
CFP	Not released									—	—	—	—	—	—	Not released
