= 2021 Georgia Tech Yellow Jackets football team =

American college football season

2021 Georgia Tech Yellow Jackets football
- Conference: Atlantic Coast Conference
- Coastal Division
- Record: 3–9 (2–6 ACC)
- Head coach: Geoff Collins (3rd season)
- Offensive coordinator: Dave Patenaude (3rd season)
- Offensive scheme: Pro spread
- Defensive coordinator: Andrew Thacker (3rd season)
- Co-defensive coordinator: Nathan Burton (3rd season)
- Base defense: Multiple
- Home stadium: Bobby Dodd Stadium

Uniform
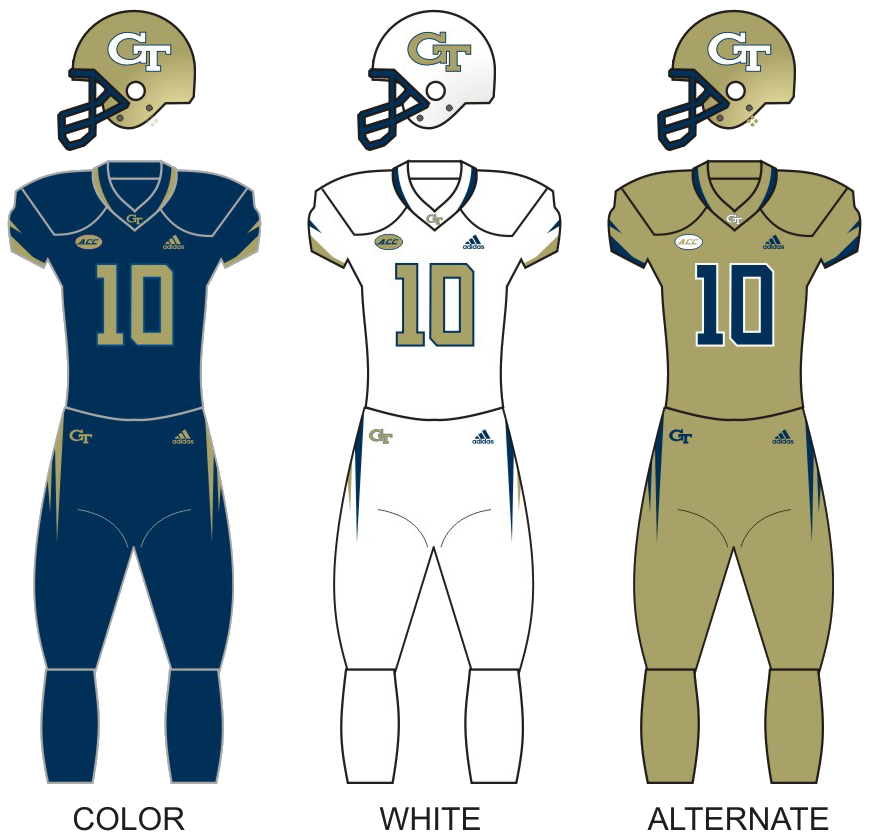

2021 Atlantic Coast Conference football standings
	Conf.			Overall
Team	W		L	W		L
Atlantic Division
No. 15 Wake Forest xy	7	–	1	11	–	3
No. 20 NC State	6	–	2	9	–	3
No. 14 Clemson	6	–	2	10	–	3
Louisville	4	–	4	6	–	7
Florida State	4	–	4	5	–	7
Boston College	2	–	6	6	–	6
Syracuse	2	–	6	5	–	7
Coastal Division
No. 13 Pittsburgh xy$	7	–	1	11	–	3
Miami (FL)	5	–	3	7	–	5
Virginia Tech	4	–	4	6	–	7
Virginia	4	–	4	6	–	6
North Carolina	3	–	5	6	–	7
Georgia Tech	2	–	6	3	–	9
Duke	0	–	8	3	–	9
Championship: Pittsburgh 45, Wake Forest 21
$ – Conference champion; x – Division champion/co-champions; y – Championship game participant; Rankings from AP Poll

The 2021 Georgia Tech Yellow Jackets football team represented the Georgia Institute of Technology during the 2021 NCAA Division I FBS football season. The Yellow Jackets were led by third-year head coach Geoff Collins. They played their home games at Bobby Dodd Stadium and compete as a member of the Atlantic Coast Conference (ACC).

== Coaching staff ==
Coach	Title	Year at Georgia Tech	Previous job
Geoff Collins	Head Coach	3rd	Temple (HC)
Brent Key	AHC/RGC/OL	3rd	Alabama (OL)
Dave Patenaude	OC/QB	3rd	Temple (OC/QB)
Andrew Thacker	DC/LB	3rd	Temple (DC/LB)
Nathan Burton	Co-DC/S	3rd	Temple (DB)
Tashard Choice	RB	3rd	North Texas (RB)
Marco Coleman	DE/OLB	3rd	Oakland Raiders (DL)
Kerry Dixon	WR	3rd	Toledo (RB)
Larry Knight	DL	3rd	Temple (OLB)
Jeff Popovich	CB/DST	3rd	Boise State (CB)
Chris Wiesehan	TE/OST	3rd	Temple (OL/RGC)

== Schedule ==
Date	Time	Opponent	Site	TV	Result	Attendance
September 4	7:30 p.m.	Northern Illinois*	Bobby Dodd Stadium; Atlanta, GA	ACCN	L 21–22	33,651
September 11	Noon	No. 22 (FCS) Kennesaw State*	Bobby Dodd Stadium; Atlanta, GA	ACCRSN	W 45–17	35,195
September 18	3:30 p.m.	at No. 6 Clemson	Memorial Stadium; Clemson, SC (rivalry)	ABC	L 8–14	81,500
September 25	7:30 p.m.	No. 21 North Carolina	Mercedes-Benz Stadium; Atlanta, GA	ACCN	W 45–22	37,450
October 2	12:00 p.m.	Pittsburgh	Bobby Dodd Stadium; Atlanta, GA	ACCN	L 21–52	36,383
October 9	12:30 p.m.	at Duke	Wallace Wade Stadium; Durham, NC	ACCRSN	W 31–27	11,849
October 23	7:30 p.m.	at Virginia	Scott Stadium; Charlottesville, VA	ACCN	L 40–48	45,837
October 30	12:00 p.m.	Virginia Tech^{†}	Bobby Dodd Stadium; Atlanta, GA (rivalry)	ACCRSN	L 17–26	35,543
November 6	12:30 p.m.	at Miami (FL)	Hard Rock Stadium; Miami Gardens, FL	ACCRSN	L 30–33	48,161
November 13	3:30 p.m.	Boston College	Bobby Dodd Stadium; Atlanta, GA	ACCRSN	L 30–41	31,511
November 20	2:30 p.m.	at No. 8 Notre Dame*	Notre Dame Stadium; Notre Dame, IN (rivalry)	NBC	L 0–55	70,011
November 27	12:00 p.m.	No. 1 Georgia*	Bobby Dodd Stadium; Atlanta, GA (Clean, Old-Fashioned Hate)	ABC	L 0–45	52,806
*Non-conference game; ^{†}Homecoming; Rankings from AP Poll (and CFP Rankings, after November 2) - Released prior to game; All times are in Eastern time

== Game summaries ==
=== Vs. Northern Illinois ===
Northern Illinois Huskies (0–0) vs. Georgia Tech Yellow Jackets (0–0)

Quarter	1	2	3	4	Total
Northern Illinois	7	7	0	8	22
Georgia Tech	0	7	0	14	21

at Bobby Dodd Stadium • Atlanta, GA

- Date: Saturday, September 4, 2021
- Game time: 7:30 p.m. EDT
- Game weather: Sunny • Temperature: 78°F
- Game attendance: 33,651
- Referee: Marcus Woods
- TV announcers (ACCN): Dave O'Brien, Tim Hasselbeck, Coley Harvey

Game information

First Quarter

- (1:56) NIU – Harrison Waylee 35 yard rush, John Richardson kick (Drive: 8 plays, 74 yards, 3:42; NIU 7–0)

Second Quarter

- (10:17) NIU – Miles Joiner 5 yard pass from Rocky Lombardi, John Richardson kick (Drive: 12 plays, 66 yards, 5:22; NIU 14–0)
- (0:47) GT – Kyric McGowan 22 yard pass from Jordan Yates, Brent Cimaglia kick (Drive: 17 plays, 97 yards, 6:00; NIU 14–7)

Fourth Quarter

- (7:44) GT – Dontae Smith 15 yard rush, Brent Cimaglia kick (Drive: 5 plays, 77 yards, 2:23; 14–14)
- (6:32) GT – Jordan Yates 4 yard rush, Brent Cimaglia kick (Drive: 3 plays, 25 yards, 0:54; GT 21–14)
- (0:38) NIU – Clint Ratkovich 3 yards pass from Rocky Lombardi, Tyrice Richie pass from Rocky Lombardi (Drive: 9 plays, 80 yards, 2:04; NIU 22–21)

Statistics	NIU	GT
First downs	15	25
Total yards	301	429
Rushes/yards	42/165	52/273
Passing yards	136	156
Passing: Comp–Att–Int	11–17–0	15–26–0
Time of possession	28:55	31:05

Team	Category	Player	Statistics
Northern Illinois	Passing	Rocky Lombardi	11/17, 136 yards, 2 TD
Northern Illinois	Rushing	Harrison Waylee	27 carries, 144 yards, 1 TD
Northern Illinois	Receiving	Tyrice Richie	2 receptions, 64 yards
Georgia Tech	Passing	Jordan Yates	12/18, 135 yards, 1 TD
Georgia Tech	Rushing	Jahmyr Gibbs	20 carries, 99 yards
Georgia Tech	Receiving	Malachi Carter	6 receptions, 92 yards

=== Vs. Kennesaw State ===
Kennesaw State (1–0) vs. Georgia Tech Yellow Jackets (0–1)

Quarter	1	2	3	4	Total
Kennesaw State	0	3	0	14	17
Georgia Tech	14	10	7	14	45

at Bobby Dodd Stadium • Atlanta, GA

- Date: Saturday, September 11, 2021
- Game time: 12:00 p.m. EDT
- Game weather: Sunny • Temperature: 79°F
- Game attendance: 35,195
- Referee: Jeff Flanagan
- TV announcers (ESPN3): Brad Rathbun, Brian Jordan, Lyndsay Rowley

Game information

First Quarter

Second Quarter

Third Quarter

Fourth Quarter

Statistics	KSU	GT
First downs	13	20
Total yards	260	412
Rushes/yards	43/149	36/158
Passing yards	111	254
Passing: Comp–Att–Int	8–20–2	17–23–0
Time of possession	33:41	26:16

Team	Category	Player	Statistics
Kennesaw State	Passing	Xavier Shepherd	8/20, 110 yards, 1 TD, 1 INT
Kennesaw State	Rushing	Iaan Cousin	3 carries, 52 yards, 1 TD
Kennesaw State	Receiving	Adeolu Adeleke	1 reception, 39 yards, 1 TD
Georgia Tech	Passing	Jordan Yates	17/23, 254 yards, 4 TD
Georgia Tech	Rushing	Dontae Smith	8 carries, 82 yards, 1 TD
Georgia Tech	Receiving	Kyric McGowan	6 receptions, 91 yards, 2 TD

=== At Clemson ===
Georgia Tech Yellow Jackets (1–1) vs. #6 Clemson Tigers (1–1)

Quarter	1	2	3	4	Total
Georgia Tech	0	3	0	5	8
Clemson	7	0	0	7	14

at Memorial Stadium • Clemson, SC

- Date: Saturday, September 18, 2021
- Game time: 3:30 p.m. EDT
- Game weather: Cloudy • Temperature: 82°F
- Game attendance: 81,500
- Referee: Jeff Heaser
- TV announcers (ESPN2): Bob Wischusen, Dan Orlovsky, Kris Budden

Game information

First Quarter

- (4:37) CLEM – Will Shipley 3-yard run, B. T. Potter kick (Drive: 8 plays, 39 yards, 3:15; CLEM 7–0)

Second Quarter

- (0:00) GT – Brent Cimaglia 22-yard field goal (Drive: 14 plays, 66 yards, 2:47; CLEM 7–3)

Third Quarter

No scoring plays

Fourth Quarter

- (8:12) CLEM – Will Shipley 3-yard run, B. T. Potter kick (Drive: 12 plays, 66 yards, 4:29; CLEM 14–3)
- (1:19) GT – Brent Cimaglia 22-yard field goal (Drive: 16 plays, 70 yards, 6:53; CLEM 14–6)
- (0:07) GT – TEAM Safety (Drive: 1 play, 2 yards, 0:08; CLEM 14–8)

Statistics	GT	CLEM
First downs	20	19
Total yards	298	284
Rushes/yards	38/95	41/158
Passing yards	203	126
Passing: Comp–Att–Int	20–34–1	18–25–0
Time of possession	30:10	29:50

Team	Category	Player	Statistics
Georgia Tech	Passing	Jordan Yates	20/34, 203 yards, 1 INT
Georgia Tech	Rushing	Jahmyr Gibbs	11 carries, 30 yards
Georgia Tech	Receiving	Kyric McGown	4 receptions, 82 yards
Clemson	Passing	DJ Uiagalelei	18/25, 126 yards
Clemson	Rushing	Will Shipley	21 carries, 88 yards, 2 TD
Clemson	Receiving	Justyn Ross	7 receptions, 61 yards

=== Vs. North Carolina ===
#21 North Carolina Tar Heels (2–1) vs. Georgia Tech Yellow Jackets (1–2)

Quarter	1	2	3	4	Total
North Carolina	7	0	7	8	22
Georgia Tech	0	13	14	18	45

at Mercedes-Benz Stadium • Atlanta, GA

- Date: Saturday, September 25, 2021
- Game time: 7:30 p.m. EDT
- Game weather: Sunny • Temperature: 72°F
- Game attendance: 37,450
- Referee: Gary Patterson
- TV announcers (ACCN): Ryan Philpott, Tim Hasselbeck, Kelsey Riggs

Game information

First Quarter

- (10:23) UNC – Sam Howell 23-yard run, Grayson Atkins kick (Drive: 4 plays, 40 yards, 1:03; UNC 7–0)

Second Quarter

- (14:21) GT – Brent Cimaglia 34-yard field goal (Drive: 9 plays, 64 yards, 5:02; UNC 7–3)
- (13:34) GT – Brent Cimaglia 32-yard field goal (Drive: 4 plays, -4 yards, 0:35; UNC 7–6)
- (2:41) GT – Jeff Sims 11-yard run, Brent Cimaglia kick (Drive: 2 plays, 17 yards, 0:42; GT 13–7)

Third Quarter

- (10:53) GT – Jeff Sims 1-yard run, Brent Cimaglia kick (Drive: 3 plays, 39 yards, 0:32; GT 20–7)
- (5:39) GT – Jahmyr Gibbs 4-yard run, Brent Cimaglia kick (Drive: 8 plays, 81 yards, 2:50; GT 27–7)
- (3:50) UNC – Kamari Morales 7-yard pass from Sam Howell, Grayson Atkins kick (Drive: 6 plays, 75 yards, 1:49; GT 27–14)

Fourth Quarter

- (13:52) GT – Malachi Carter 27-yard pass from Jeff Sims, Dylan Leonard pass from Peje' Harris (Drive: 9 plays, 75 yards, 4:58; GT 35–14)
- (11:19) UNC – Josh Downs 4-yard pass from Sam Howell, Cayden Baker pass from Sam Howell (Drive: 8 plays, 75 yards, 2:33; GT 35–22)
- (4:07) GT – Brent Cimaglia 31-yard field goal (Drive: 12 plays, 52 yards, 7:11; GT 38–22)
- (1:13) GT – Jeff Sims 50-yard run, Brent Cimaglia kick (Drive: 2 plays, 51 yards, 0:53; GT 45–22)

Statistics	UNC	GT
First downs	18	19
Total yards	369	394
Rushes/yards	35/63	43/261
Passing yards	306	133
Passing: Comp–Att–Int	25–39–0	13–19–0
Time of possession	30:05	29:55

Team	Category	Player	Statistics
North Carolina	Passing	Sam Howell	25/39, 306 yards, 2 TD
North Carolina	Rushing	Ty Chandler	17 carries, 48 yards
North Carolina	Receiving	Emery Simmons	3 receptions, 110 yards
Georgia Tech	Passing	Jeff Sims	10/13, 112 yards, 1 TD
Georgia Tech	Rushing	Jeff Sims	10 carries, 128 yards, 3 TD
Georgia Tech	Receiving	Malachi Carter	3 receptions, 48 yards, 1 TD

=== Vs. Pittsburgh ===
Pittsburgh Panthers (3–1) vs. Georgia Tech Yellow Jackets (2–2)

Quarter	1	2	3	4	Total
Pittsburgh	21	21	7	3	52
Georgia Tech	7	7	7	0	21

at Bobby Dodd Stadium • Atlanta, GA

- Date: Saturday, October 2, 2021
- Game time: 12:00 p.m. EDT
- Game weather: Cloudy • Temperature: 75°F
- Game attendance: 36,383
- Referee: Stuart Mullins
- TV announcers (ACCN): Wes Durham, Roddy Jones, Lericia Harris

Game information

First Quarter

Second Quarter

Third Quarter

Fourth Quarter

Statistics	PITT	GT
First downs	27	21
Total yards	580	432
Rushes/yards	41/181	31/73
Passing yards	399	359
Passing: Comp–Att–Int	24–37–0	24–33–2
Time of possession	34:40	25:20

Team	Category	Player	Statistics
Pittsburgh	Passing	Kenny Pickett	23/36, 389 yards, 4 TD
Pittsburgh	Rushing	Israel Abanikanda	15 carries, 60 yards, 2 TD
Pittsburgh	Receiving	Taysir Mack	5 receptions, 121 yards, 1 TD
Georgia Tech	Passing	Jeff Sims	24/33, 359 yards, 2 TD, 2 INT
Georgia Tech	Rushing	Donte Smith	9 carries, 43 yards, 1 TD
Georgia Tech	Receiving	Jahmyr Gibbs	6 receptions, 125 yards

=== At Duke ===
Duke Blue Devils (3–2) vs. Georgia Tech Yellow Jackets (2–3)

Quarter	1	2	3	4	Total
Georgia Tech	14	3	7	7	31
Duke	7	7	3	10	27

at Wallace Wade Stadium • Durham, NC

- Date: Saturday, October 9, 2021
- Game time: 12:30 p.m. EDT
- Game weather: Rainy • Temperature: 64°F
- Game attendance: 11,849
- Referee: Jeff Flanagan
- TV announcers (ESPN3): Tom Werme, James Bates, Abby LaBar

Game information

First Quarter

Second Quarter

Third Quarter

Fourth Quarter

Statistics	GT	DUKE
First downs	17	27
Total yards	440	489
Rushes/yards	39/143	62/197
Passing yards	297	292
Passing: Comp–Att–Int	12–25–2	22–29–1
Time of possession	24:31	35:29

Team	Category	Player	Statistics
Georgia Tech	Passing	Jeff Sims	12/25, 297 yards, 3 TD, 2 INT
Georgia Tech	Rushing	Jeff Sims	12 carries, 55 yards, 1 TD
Georgia Tech	Receiving	Jahmyr Gibbs	3 receptions, 82 yards, 1 TD
Duke	Passing	Gunnar Holmberg	22/29, 292 yards, 2 TD, 1 INT
Duke	Rushing	Mataeo Durant	43 carries, 152 yards, 1 TD
Duke	Receiving	Jalon Calhoun	5 receptions, 103 yards

=== At Virginia ===
Virginia Cavaliers (5–2) vs. Georgia Tech Yellow Jackets (3–3)

Quarter	1	2	3	4	Total
Georgia Tech	13	3	8	16	40
Virginia	7	17	17	7	48

at Scott Stadium • Charlottesville, VA

- Date: Saturday, October 23, 2021
- Game time: 7:30 p.m. EDT
- Game weather: Sunny • Temperature: 79°F
- Game attendance: 45,837
- Referee: Jeff Heaser
- TV announcers (ACCN): Dave O'Brien, Tim Hasselbeck, Coley Harvey

Game information

First Quarter

Second Quarter

Third Quarter

Fourth Quarter

Statistics	GT	UVA
First downs	28	32
Total yards	570	636
Rushes/yards	34/270	30/240
Passing yards	300	396
Passing: Comp–Att–Int	27–44–1	29–43–0
Time of possession	28:07	31:53

Team	Category	Player	Statistics
Georgia Tech	Passing	Jeff Sims	27/44, 300 yards, 3 TD, 1 INT
Georgia Tech	Rushing	Jahmyr Gibbs	13 carries, 132 yards, 1 TD
Georgia Tech	Receiving	Kyric McGowan	7 receptions, 86 yards, 2 TD
Virginia	Passing	Brennan Armstrong	29/43, 396 yards, 4 TD
Virginia	Rushing	Brennan Armstrong	12 carries, 99 yards, 2 TD
Virginia	Receiving	Dontayvion Wicks	6 receptions, 168 yards, 2 TD

=== Vs. Virginia Tech ===
Virginia Tech Hokies (3–4) vs. Georgia Tech Yellow Jackets (3–4)

Quarter	1	2	3	4	Total
Virginia Tech	14	6	3	3	26
Georgia Tech	7	0	10	0	17

at Bobby Dodd Stadium • Atlanta, GA

- Date: Saturday, October 30, 2021
- Game time: 12:00 p.m. EDT
- Game weather: Cloudy • Temperature: 56°F
- Game attendance: 35,543
- Referee: Marcus Woods
- TV announcers (ESPN3): Tom Werme, James Bates, Wiley Ballard

Game information

First quarter

- (9:51) VT – Tré Turner 69 yd Pass From Braxton Burmeister (John Parker Romo Kick) (Drive: 4 plays 86 yards, 1:17; VT 7–0)
- (6:21) GT – Kyric McGowan 26 yd Pass From Jeff Sims (Brent Cimaglia Kick) (Drive: 9 plays 75 yards, 3:30; Tied 7–7)
- (2:20) VT – Tayvion Robinson 4 yd Pass From Braxton Burmeister (John Parker Romo Kick) (Drive: 10 plays 75 yards, 4:01; VT 14–7)

Second quarter

- (4:51) VT – John Parker Romo 23 yd Field Goal (Drive: 7 plays 70 yards, 1:54; VT 17–7)
- (0:01) VT – John Parker Romo 43 yd Field Goal (Drive: 8 plays 64 yards, 1:45; VT 20–7)

Third quarter

- (10:22) GT – Brent Cimaglia 37 yd Field Goal (Drive: 9 plays 52 yards, 4:30; VT 20–10)
- (6:14) VT – John Parker Romo 34 yd Field Goal (Drive: 4 plays yards, 2:14; VT 23–10)
- (0:05) GT – Adonicas Sanders 23 yd Pass From Jeff Sims (Brent Cimaglia Kick) (Drive: 4 plays 64 yards, 1:18; VT 23–17)

Fourth quarter

- (4:21) VT – John Parker Romo 21 yd Field Goal (Drive: 12 plays 85 yards, 7:01; VT 26–17)

Statistics	VT	GT
First downs	23	16
Total yards	487	366
Rushes/yards	53/233	30/183
Passing yards	254	183
Passing: Comp–Att–Int	15–25–0	15–26–1
Time of possession	35:48	24:12

Team	Category	Player	Statistics
Virginia Tech	Passing	Braxton Burmeister	15/25, 254 yards, 2 TD
Virginia Tech	Rushing	Malachi Thomas	25 carries, 103 yards
Virginia Tech	Receiving	Tré Turner	7 receptions, 187 yards, 1 TD
Georgia Tech	Passing	Jeff Sims	15/26, 183 yards, 2 TD, 1 INT
Georgia Tech	Rushing	Jahmyr Gibbs	11 carries, 113 yards
Georgia Tech	Receiving	Adonicas Sanders	4 receptions, 64 yards, 1 TD

=== At Miami(FL) ===
Georgia Tech Yellow Jackets (3–5) vs. Miami Hurricanes (4–4)

Quarter	1	2	3	4	Total
Georgia Tech	7	14	7	2	30
Miami(FL)	14	3	7	9	33

at Hard Rock Stadium • Miami Gardens, FL

- Date: Saturday, November 6, 2021
- Game time: 12:30 p.m. EDT
- Game weather: Sunny • Temperature: 72°F
- Game attendance: 48,161
- Referee: Gary Patterson
- TV announcers (ESPN3): Tom Werme, James Bates, Wiley Ballard

Game information

First quarter

- (9:10) MIA – Mike Harley Jr. 8-yard pass from Tyler Van Dyke, (Andres Borregales kick) (Drive: 11 plays, 93 yards, 3:39; Miami 7–0)
- (7:14) MIA – Charleston Rambo 35-yard pass from Tyler Van Dyke, (Andres Borregales kick) (Drive: 4 plays, 58 yards, 0:58; Miami 14–0)
- (4:21) GT – Jordan Mason 71-yard run, (Brent Cimaglia kick) (Drive: 6 plays, 93 yards, 2:53; Miami 14–7)

Second quarter

- (13:22) GT – Jahmyr Gibbs 29-yard run, (Brent Cimaglia kick) (Drive: 7 plays, 86 yards, 2:57; Tied 14–14)
- (9:48) MIA – Andres Borregales 28-yard field goal (Drive: 5 plays, 43 yards, 0:57; Miami 17–14)
- (7:56) GT – Jaylon King 40-yard fumble return, (Brent Cimaglia kick) (Georgia Tech 21–17)

Third quarter

- (13:59) MIA – Jaylan Knighton 2-yard run, (Andres Borregales kick) (Drive: 4 plays, 75 yards, 1:01; Miami 24–21)
- (13:59) GT – Jahmyr Gibbs 50-yard pass from Jeff Sims, (Brent Cimaglia kick) (Drive: 7 plays, 73 yards, 3:26; Georgia Tech 28–24)

Fourth quarter

- (13:20) MIA – Andres Borregales 31-yard field goal (Drive: 12 plays, 53 yards, 5:05; Georgia Tech 28–27)
- (10:27) MIA – Key'Shawn Smith 15-yard pass from Tyler Van Dyke, (Two-point pass failed) (Drive: 5 plays, 51 yards, 1:50; Miami 33–28)
- (10:27) GT – Juanyeh Thomas 100-yard interception return for safety (Miami 33–30)

Statistics	GT	MIA
First downs	15	24
Total yards	329	563
Rushes/yards	32/135	42/174
Passing yards	194	389
Passing: Comp–Att–Int	21–38–1	22–34–0
Time of possession	34:13	25:47

Team	Category	Player	Statistics
Georgia Tech	Passing	Jeff Sims	21/38, 194 yards, 1 TD, 1 INT
Georgia Tech	Rushing	Jordan Mason	8 carries, 75 yards, 1 TD
Georgia Tech	Receiving	Jahmyr Gibbs	4 receptions, 72 yards, 1 TD
Miami	Passing	Tyler Van Dyke	22/34, 389 yards, 3 TD
Miami	Rushing	Jaylan Knighton	32 carries, 162 yards, 1 TD
Miami	Receiving	Charleston Rambo	7 receptions, 210 yards, 1 TD

=== Vs. Boston College ===
Boston College Eagles (5–4) vs. Georgia Tech Yellow Jackets (3–6)

Quarter	1	2	3	4	Total
Boston College	7	21	0	13	41
Georgia Tech	14	7	3	6	30

at Bobby Dodd Stadium • Atlanta, GA

- Date: Saturday, November 13, 2021
- Game time: 3:30 p.m. EDT
- Game weather: Sunny • Temperature: 52°F
- Game attendance: 31,511
- Referee: Jeff Heaser
- TV announcers (ACCN): Tom Werme, James Bates, Lauren Jbara

Game information

First Quarter

Second Quarter

Third Quarter

Fourth Quarter

Statistics	BC	GT
First downs	26	25
Total yards	505	343
Rushes/yards	38/195	40/213
Passing yards	310	130
Passing: Comp–Att–Int	13–20–0	18–29–1
Time of possession	27:07	32:53

Team	Category	Player	Statistics
Boston College	Passing	Phil Jurkovec	13/20, 310 yards, 2 TD
Boston College	Rushing	Pat Garwo III	24 carries, 104 yards
Boston College	Receiving	Zay Flowers	2 receptions, 87 yards, 2 TD
Georgia Tech	Passing	Jordan Yates	17/28, 126 yards, 1 TD, 1 INT
Georgia Tech	Rushing	Jahmyr Gibbs	19 carries, 96 yards, 1 TD
Georgia Tech	Receiving	Jahmyr Gibbs	5 receptions, 29 yards

=== At Notre Dame ===
Georgia Tech Yellow Jackets (3–7) vs. #6 Notre Dame Fighting Irish (9–1)

Quarter	1	2	3	4	Total
Georgia Tech	0	0	0	0	0
Notre Dame	24	21	10	0	55

at Notre Dame Stadium • Notre Dame, IN

- Date: Saturday, November 20, 2021
- Game time: 2:30 p.m. EDT
- Game weather: Sunny • Temperature: 42°F
- Game attendance: 70,011
- Referee: Stuart Mullins
- TV announcers (NBC): Mike Tirico, Drew Brees, Kathryn Tappen

Game information

First Quarter

- (12:35) ND – Jonathan Doerer 41-yard field goal (Drive: 5 plays, 25 yards, 2:25; Notre Dame 3–0)
- (10:33) ND – Jack Kiser 43-yard interception return, (Jonathan Doerer kick) (Drive: 5 plays, 25 yards, 1:57; Notre Dame 10–0)
- (4:57) ND – Kyren Williams 9-yard run, (Jonathan Doerer kick) (Drive: 9 plays, 65 yards, 3:29; Notre Dame 17–0)
- (0:08) ND – Michael Mayer 52-yard pass from Jack Coan, (Jonathan Doerer kick) (Drive: 4 plays, 69 yards, 1:22; Notre Dame 24–0)

Second Quarter

- (10:41) ND – Logan Diggs 5-yard run, (Jonathan Doerer kick) (Drive: 7 plays, 61 yards, 3:45; Notre Dame 31–0)
- (7:21) ND – Logan Diggs 20-yard pass from Jack Coan, (Jonathan Doerer kick) (Drive: 4 plays, 60 yards, 1:47; Notre Dame 38–0)
- (4:33) ND – Kyren Williams 1-yard run, (Jonathan Doerer kick) (Drive: 7 plays, 89 yards, 3:01; Notre Dame 45–0)

Third Quarter

- (6:45) ND – Jonathan Doerer 26-yard field goal (Drive: 6 plays, 86 yards, 3:02; Notre Dame 48–0)
- (4:33) ND – Myron Tagovailoa-Amosa 70-yard fumble return, (Josh Bryan kick) (Drive: 5 plays, 46 yards, 1:48; Notre Dame 55–0)

Fourth Quarter

No scoring plays

Statistics	GT	ND
First downs	11	23
Total yards	224	514
Rushes/yards	35/128	33/212
Passing yards	96	302
Passing: Comp–Att–Int	14–28–1	18–26–0
Time of possession	30:39	29:21

Team	Category	Player	Statistics
Georgia Tech	Passing	Jordan Yates	14/28, 96 yards, 1 INT
Georgia Tech	Rushing	Harrison Waylee	12 carries, 58 yards
Georgia Tech	Receiving	Malachi Carter	3 receptions, 29 yards
Notre Dame	Passing	Jack Coan	15/20, 285 yards, 2 TD
Notre Dame	Rushing	Tyler Buchner	5 carries, 67 yards
Notre Dame	Receiving	Kevin Austin Jr.	2 receptions, 89 yards

=== Vs. Georgia ===
No. 1 Georgia Bulldogs (11–0) vs. Georgia Tech Yellow Jackets (3–8)

Quarter	1	2	3	4	Total
No. 1 Georgia	10	14	14	7	45
Georgia Tech	0	0	0	0	0

at Bobby Dodd Stadium • Atlanta, GA

- Date: Saturday, November 27, 2021
- Game time: 12:00 p.m. EDT
- Game weather: Sunny • Temperature: 53°F
- Game attendance: 52,806
- Referee: Mike Roche
- TV announcers (ABC): Bob Wischusen (play-by-play), Dan Orlovsky (color), and Kris Budden (sideline)
- ESPN

Game information

First quarter

- (10:34) UGA – Jack Podlesny 38 Yd Field Goal (Georgia 3–0)
- (4:38) UGA – Jermaine Burton 25 Yd pass from Stetson Bennett (Jack Podlesny Kick) (Georgia 10–0)

Second quarter

- (13:33) UGA – Ladd McConkey 11 Yd pass from Stetson Bennett (Jack Podlesny Kick) (Georgia 17–0)
- (11:03) UGA – Brock Bowers 77 Yd pass from Stetson Bennett (Jack Podlesny Kick) (Georgia 24–0)

Third quarter

- (9:55) UGA - Brock Bowers 9 Yd pass from Stetson Bennett (Jack Podlesny Kick) (Georgia 31–0)
- (9:55) UGA - Kenny McIntosh 59 Yd Run (Jack Podlesny Kick) (Georgia 38–0)

Fourth quarter

- (13:14) UGA - Daijun Edwards 3 Yd Run (Jack Podlesny Kick) (Georgia 45–0)

Statistics	UGA	GT
First downs	21	9
Total yards	463	166
Rushes/yards	31/208	35/98
Passing yards	255	68
Passing: Comp–Att–Int	14–20–0	8–16–0
Time of possession	26:52	33:08

Team	Category	Player	Statistics
Georgia	Passing	Stetson Bennett	14/20, 255 yards, 4 TD
Georgia	Rushing	Kenny McIntosh	2 carries, 68 yards, 1 TD
Georgia	Receiving	Brock Bowers	3 receptions, 100 yards, 2 TD
Georgia Tech	Passing	Jordan Yates	8/16, 68 yards
Georgia Tech	Rushing	Dontae Smith	11 carries, 59 yards
Georgia Tech	Receiving	Dylan Leonard	2 receptions, 43 yards

== Players drafted into the NFL ==
Round	Pick	Player	Position	NFL club
7	228	Tariq Carpenter	LB	Green Bay Packers
