= Chip Long =

American football coach (born 1983)

Biographical details
- Born: May 1, 1983 (age 43)

Playing career
- 2002–2005: North Alabama
- Positions: Wide receiver, tight end

Coaching career (HC unless noted)
- 2006–2007: Louisville (GA)
- 2008–2009: Arkansas (GA)
- 2010–2011: Illinois (TE/FB)
- 2012–2015: Arizona State (TE/RC)
- 2016: Memphis (OC/TE)
- 2017–2019: Notre Dame (OC/TE)
- 2020: Tennessee (OA)
- 2021: Tulane (OC/QB)
- 2022: Georgia Tech (OC/TE)
- 2023: Louisville (Quality Control)
- 2024: Southern Miss (OC/TE)

Chip Long (born May 1, 1983) is an American college football coach. He was most recently the offensive coordinator and tight ends coach for the University of Southern Mississippi. He previously served as the offensive coordinator for Tulane University, the University of Notre Dame, the University of Memphis and Georgia Tech. He is married to Karissa Long and has two daughters, Lyla and Alyson.

== Coaching career ==
=== Early coaching career ===
Long began his coaching career as a graduate assistant at Louisville, where he held the position for two years. This was followed by two years as a graduate assistant at Arkansas. In 2010 and 2011 Long worked as Illinois' tight ends and fullbacks coach.

In 2012, Long went to Arizona State to coach the Sun Devils tight ends while also serving as the recruiting coordinator. Long followed Mike Norvell from Arizona State to Memphis Tigers to serve as offensive coordinator under Norvell in 2016.

=== Notre Dame ===
After one season at Memphis, Long left to become offensive coordinator for Notre Dame. Long was a finalist for the 2018 Broyles Award, which is given to the nation's top assistant coach, after the Irish finished the regular season undefeated, and had secured their first appearance in the college football playoffs.

=== Tennessee ===
On December 11, 2019, it was announced that Long would not be retained by the University of Notre Dame. In February 2020, Long accepted an off-the-field analyst position at the University of Tennessee.

=== Tulane ===
On December 8, 2020, Tulane announced the addition of Long as offensive coordinator.

=== Georgia Tech ===
On December 5, 2021, Georgia Tech announced Long was hired to become the new offensive coordinator for coach Geoff Collins and the Yellow Jackets. Additionally he originally was supposed to be the quarterbacks coach, but he then was transitioned to the team's tight ends coach. Collins was fired midway through the 2022 season, and Long was released from his contract by new head coach Brent Key.

=== Southern Miss ===
In December 2023, Southern Miss announced the hiring of Long as their offensive coordintor.
