= Nathan Burton =

American football player and coach (born 1980)

Current position
- Title: Co-defensive coordinator & inside linebackers coach
- Team: Troy
- Conference: Sun Belt

Biographical details
- Born: April 29, 1980 (age 46)
- Education: Georgia Tech

Playing career
- 2001–2004: Georgia Tech
- Position: Safety

Coaching career (HC unless noted)
- 2005–2008: Georgia Tech (GA)
- 2009: Oklahoma State (GA)
- 2010–2011: UT Martin (LB/DB)
- 2012–2013: Shorter (DC/DB)
- 2014–2016: West Alabama (DC/DB/LB)
- 2017: NC State (DQC)
- 2018: Temple (DB)
- 2019–2021: Georgia Tech (Co-DC/S)
- 2022: New Orleans Breakers (DB)
- 2023: Kennesaw State (DC)
- 2024–present: Troy (Co-DC/ILB)

Nathan Isaac Burton (born April 29, 1980) is an American football coach. He is the co-defensive coordinator and inside linebackers coach for Troy University, positions he has held since 2024. He previously was the defensive backs coach for the New Orleans Breakers of the United States Football League (USFL). He previously was the co-defensive coordinator and safeties coach for the Georgia Tech Yellow Jackets and the Kennesaw State Owls.

== Playing career ==
Burton was a walk-on at Georgia Tech and played safety for the Yellow Jackets from 2001 to 2004.

== Coaching career ==
=== Early coaching career ===
After his playing career concluded, Burton stayed at Georgia Tech as a graduate assistant, a role he held for four seasons. He was also a graduate assistant at Oklahoma State for one season before moving on to UT Martin as their linebackers/defensive backs coach. Burton also had stints as a defensive coordinator at both Shorter and West Alabama before spending 2017 at NC State as a quality control assistant.

=== Temple ===
Burton was named the defensive backs coach at Temple in 2018, reuniting him with Owls head coach Geoff Collins, who was an assistant at Georgia Tech when Burton was a player.

=== Georgia Tech ===
After Collins was named head coach at Georgia Tech in 2019, Burton was named the co-defensive coordinator and safeties coach for the Yellow Jackets. His contract was not renewed after the 2021 season.

=== New Orleans Breakers ===
In 2022, he coached the secondary for the New Orleans Breakers of the USFL.

=== Kennesaw State ===
In 2023, Burton was named the Defensive Coordinator for Kennesaw State Owls.
