= Jahmyr Gibbs =

American football player (born 2002)

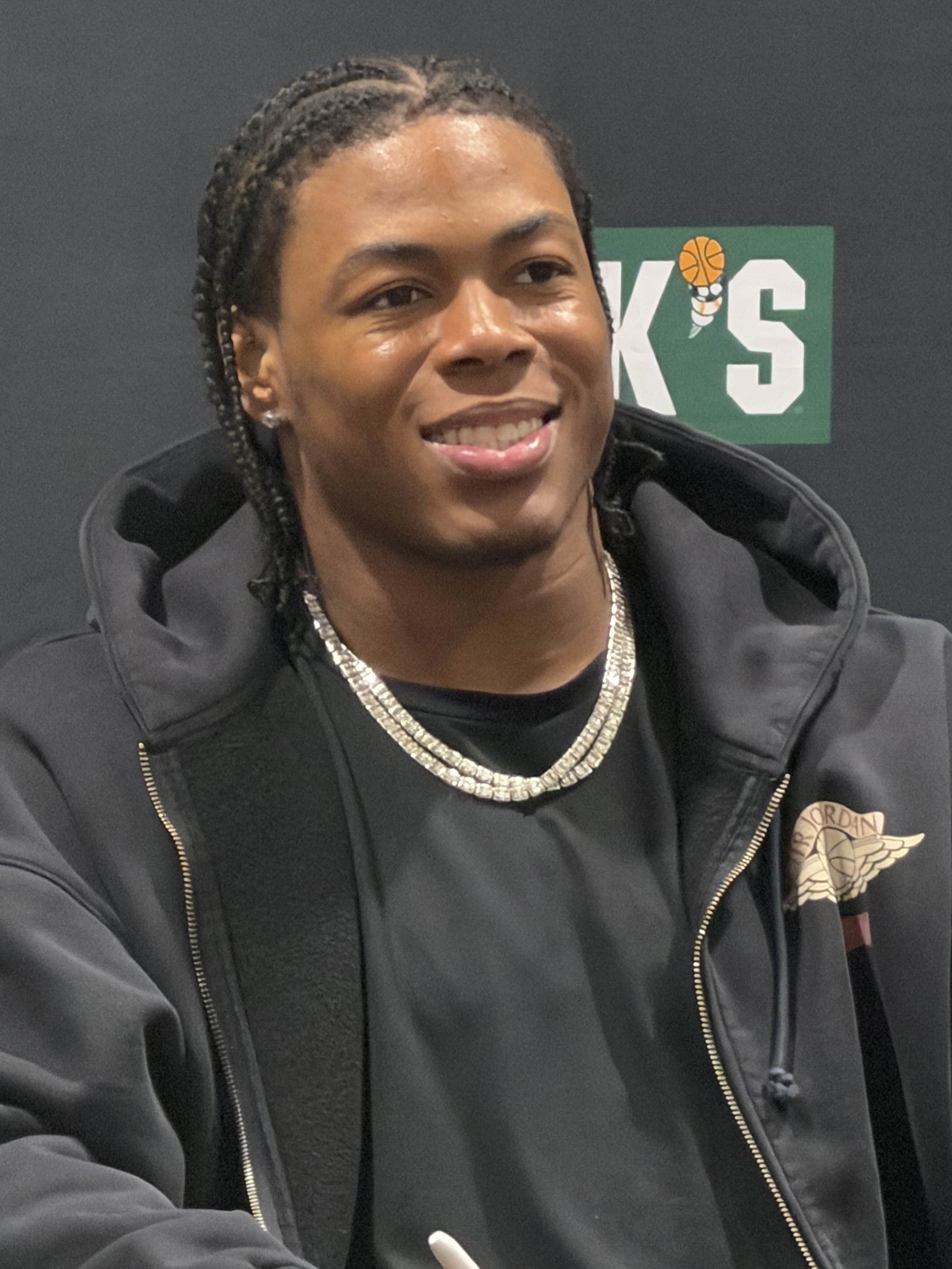
- Gibbs in 2026

No. 0 – Detroit Lions
- Position: Running back
- Roster status: Active

Personal information
- Born: March 20, 2002 (age 24); Dalton, Georgia, U.S.
- Listed height: 5 ft 9 in (1.75 m)
- Listed weight: 202 lb (92 kg)

Career information
- High school: Dalton
- College: Georgia Tech (2020–2021); Alabama (2022)
- NFL draft: 2023: 1st round, 12th overall pick

Career history
- Detroit Lions (2023–present)

Awards and highlights
- 3× Pro Bowl (2023–2025); NFL rushing touchdowns co-leader (2024 (Note: Tied with Derrick Henry and James Cook)); PFWA All-Rookie Team (2023); Second-team All-American (2021); Third-team All-American (2022); First-team All-ACC (2021); Second-team All-SEC (2022)

Career NFL statistics as of Week 10, 2026
- Rushing yards: 4,580
- Rushing average: 5.2
- Rushing touchdowns: 50
- Receptions: 222
- Receiving yards: 1,833
- Receiving touchdowns: 12
- Stats at Pro Football Reference

Jahmyr Gibbs (/dʒəˈmɪər/ jə-MEER; born March 20, 2002) is an American professional football running back for the Detroit Lions of the National Football League (NFL). He played college football for the Georgia Tech Yellow Jackets and Alabama Crimson Tide. Gibbs was selected with the 12th overall pick by the Lions in the first round of the 2023 NFL draft.

With the Lions, he became part of a rushing tandem with David Montgomery, nicknamed "Sonic" (Gibbs) and "Knuckles" (Montgomery). In 2024, Gibbs set a Detroit franchise record for the most touchdowns scored in a single season (20), which also led the league. He was selected to the Pro Bowl in each of his first three NFL seasons, from 2023 to 2025.

== Early life ==
Gibbs was born on March 20, 2002 and grew up in Dalton, Georgia. After departing from his biological parents at a young age, he was raised by his grandmother, Angela Willis. Gibbs grew up in poverty, living at shelters alongside his grandmother for a portion of his childhood. Opportunities would begin to open up for Gibbs when he began attending Dalton High School. At the age of fifteen, Gibbs would be adopted by Dusty and Greg Ross, parents of Dalton teammate John Ross. Around this time, he began to emerge as a football player. Gibbs rushed for 897 yards and 10 touchdowns as a sophomore, and 1,431 yards and 20 touchdowns in his junior season. As a senior, Gibbs led the state with 2,554 rushing yards and 40 touchdowns and was named first team all-state, the Georgia 6-A 2020 Offensive Player of the Year and a first team All-American by Sports Illustrated. He was also invited to play in the 2020 All-American Bowl. Gibbs finished his high school career with 4,882 rushing yards and 70 touchdowns.

Gibbs was initially rated a three-star recruit and committed to play college football for the Georgia Tech Yellow Jackets at the end of his junior year over offers from Michigan, Texas A&M, and North Carolina. Gibbs was re-rated as a four-star prospect during his senior year and was further recruited by Florida, Georgia and Alabama, but ultimately decided to maintain his commitment to Georgia Tech.

== College career ==
=== Georgia Tech ===
After missing the Yellow Jackets' season opener, Gibbs made his collegiate debut the following week against the UCF Knights and returned the opening kickoff 75 yards. He finished the game with 219 all-purpose yards and two touchdowns and was named the Atlantic Coast Conference (ACC) Freshman of the Week. Gibbs scored five total touchdowns in his first three collegiate games, with one receiving touchdown made in each game. He finished his freshman season with 89 carries for 460 yards and four rushing touchdowns, 24 receptions for 303 yards and three receiving touchdowns, and eight kickoff returns for 205 yards. Gibbs was named honorable mention All-ACC as a return specialist and a second-team Freshman All-American.

In his 2021 sophomore year, Gibbs returned to appear in 12 games with the Yellow Jackets to record 143 total carries for 746 yards rushing and four touchdowns, 36 receptions for 470 receiving yards and four touchdowns, and 23 kickoff returns for 589 yards and one return touchdown. He averaged 5.2 yards a carry, 13.1 yards per catch, and 25.6 yards per kick return; this was good for 1,805 all-purpose yards total, second-best by a Yellow Jacket all-time. For his year, Gibbs was named a second-team All-American and an all-purpose first-team All-ACC recipient.

=== Alabama ===
In 2022, Gibbs transferred to the University of Alabama to play for the Crimson Tide. On October 1, in a victory over #20 Arkansas, he had 18 carries for 206 rushing yards and two rushing touchdowns. In the following game, Gibbs had 21 carries for 154 rushing yards in a victory over Texas A&M. In the team's seventh game, a 49–52 loss to #6 Tennessee on the road, he had 24 carries for 103 rushing yards and three rushing touchdowns. Gibbs finished the 2022 season with 151 carries for 926 rushing yards and seven touchdowns on the ground, as well as 44 receptions for 444 receiving yards and three touchdowns through the air. For his year, Gibbs earned third-team All-American honors from the Associated Press as well as being named second-team All-Southeastern Conference (SEC).

== Professional career ==
Pre-draft measurables
Height	Weight	Arm length	Hand span	Wingspan	40-yard dash	10-yard split	20-yard split	Vertical jump
5 ft 9 1/8 in (1.76 m)	199 lb (90 kg)	30 1/2 in (0.77 m)	9 1/4 in (0.23 m)	6 ft 2 1/8 in (1.88 m)	4.36 s	1.52 s	2.52 s	33.5 in (0.85 m)
All values from the NFL Combine

Gibbs was selected in the first round, 12th overall, by the Detroit Lions in the 2023 NFL draft.

=== 2023 ===
In Gibbs' rookie season, he teamed up with fellow running back David Montgomery to create the tandem described as a "two-headed monster" by Lions head coach Dan Campbell. Gibbs and Montgomery were given the nicknames "Sonic" and "Knuckles" (after characters from the Sonic the Hedgehog media franchise), respectively, due to Gibbs' speed and Montgomery's strength.

Gibbs made his NFL debut in the 2023 NFL Kickoff Game, where he made 7 rushes for 42 yards and 2 receptions for 18 more as the Lions defeated the Kansas City Chiefs 21–20. In Week 7, he scored his first career touchdown on a 21-yard run in a 38–6 loss to the Baltimore Ravens. The following week against the Las Vegas Raiders on Monday Night Football, he made 26 rushes for a season-high 152 yards and a touchdown, as well as five receptions for 37 yards, as the Lions won 26–14. In Week 10 against the Los Angeles Chargers, following the bye week, Gibbs recorded his first multi-touchdown game as he took 14 carries for 77 yards and two touchdowns on the ground, accompanied by three receptions for 35 yards in the air, in the 41–38 win. In Week 15 against the Denver Broncos, he had 11 carries for 100 yards with one rushing touchdown and one receiving touchdown (his only of the season) in the 42–17 win.

He finished his rookie season with 182 carries for 945 yards and ten rushing touchdowns to go with 52 receptions for 316 yards and one receiving touchdown in 15 games and three starts. He was selected as a Pro Bowl Alternate for the 2023 Pro Bowl, and was named to the 2023 PFWA All-Rookie Team. He scored a rushing touchdown in all three of the Lions' postseason games.

=== 2024 ===
In Week 7 of the 2024 season against the Minnesota Vikings, Gibbs had 160 total yards and two rushing touchdowns in the narrow 31–29 win. In the following game against the Tennessee Titans, he had 11 carries for 127 yards and a touchdown in the 52–14 win. In Week 11 against the Jacksonville Jaguars, he had 123 yards from scrimmage and a rushing touchdown in the 52–6 victory. In Week 15 against the Buffalo Bills, he had 114 total yards, one rushing touchdown and one receiving touchdown (his third of the season) in the 42–48 loss. The following week against the Chicago Bears, in his second start of the season, he had 109 rushing yards and a touchdown in the 34–17 win. In Week 17 against the San Francisco 49ers, he had 117 rushing yards and a touchdown in the 40–34 win. In the final game of the regular season against the (14–2) Vikings at home for the NFC North division title and the NFC No. 1 seed, Gibbs made 23 rushes for a season-high 139 yards and scored four touchdowns (three rushing and one receiving) in the 31–9 victory, leading the league with 20 total touchdowns scored. He earned NFC Offensive Player of the Week honors for his performance, and was named NFC Offensive Player of the Month for December. His 20 total touchdowns also set a franchise record for the most in a single season, passing a tied record previously set by Jamaal Williams (17 in 2022) and Barry Sanders (17 in 1991). For the season, he tied with Derrick Henry and James Cook (each with 16) as the NFL rushing touchdowns leader. He finished the season with 250 carries for 1,412 yards and 16 rushing touchdowns, to go with 52 receptions for 517 yards and four receiving touchdowns. He earned Pro Bowl honors for the 2024 season.

In the Divisional Round against the Washington Commanders, Gibbs had 175 total yards and two rushing touchdowns in the 31–45 loss. He was ranked 27th by his fellow players on the NFL Top 100 Players of 2025.

=== 2025 ===
In the off-season, Gibbs changed his number from 26 to 0. He stated in an interview that he "hated 26" out of those being offered by Detroit after he was drafted; the others being 33, 35 and 40.

Gibbs had a relatively slow start to the 2025 season. In the season opener against the Green Bay Packers, he made nine rushes for 19 yards, and 10 receptions for 31 yards, with no touchdowns in a 13–27 loss. However, he quickly bounced back in Week 2 against the Chicago Bears, where he had 104 scrimmage yards with a rushing touchdown in the 52–21 win. The following week against the Baltimore Ravens, he had 99 total yards with two rushing touchdowns in the 38–30 road win. In Week 7 against the Tampa Bay Buccaneers, Gibbs rushed for 136 yards on 17 carries and added 82 receiving yards on three catches. In Week 10, Gibbs recorded 172 scrimmage yards and three total touchdowns in a 44-22 win over the Washington Commanders, earning NFC Offensive Player of the Week. In Week 12, Gibbs became the second player after LaDainian Tomlinson to rush for at least 200 yards while having at least 10 receptions in the same game. He totaled 219 rushing yards and two rushing touchdowns, and 11 catches for 45 yards and a receiving touchdown in the 34–27 win over the New York Giants, earning another NFC Offensive Player of the Week. In Week 14 against the Dallas Cowboys, he had 120 scrimmage yards and three rushing touchdowns in the 44–30 win. He finished the 2025 season with 243 carries for 1,223 rushing yards and 13 rushing touchdowns to go with 77 receptions for 616 receiving yards and five receiving touchdowns. He earned Pro Bowl honors for the 2025 season.

=== 2026 ===
On April 28, 2026, the Lions exercised the fifth-year option on Gibbs' contract. On August 6, the Lions signed Gibbs to a three-year, $67.5 million deal that could be worth up to $75.75 million and includes $51.5 million guaranteed. This deal made him the highest-paid running back ever. In Week 5 against the Arizona Cardinals, Gibbs posted 207 scrimmage yards and a pair of rushing touchdowns, earning him NFC Offensive Player of the Week. In Week 10, posted 252 total scrimmage yards against the New England Patriots in the Lions' 35-10 victory in Munich, earning his second NFC Offensive Player of the Week honors of the season.

== Career statistics ==
Legend
	Led the league
**Bold**	Career high

=== NFL ===
==== Regular season ====
Year	Team	Games		Rushing					Receiving					Fumbles	
Year	Team	GP	GS	Att	Yds	Avg	Lng	TD	Rec	Yds	Avg	Lng	TD	Fum	Lost
2023	DET	15	3	182	945	5.2	36	10	52	316	6.1	24	1	**2**	1
2024	DET	17	4	**250**	**1,412**	**5.6**	70	**16**	52	517	**9.9**	**54**	4	1	1
2025	DET	17	17	243	1,223	5.0	**78**	13	**77**	**616**	8.0	42	**5**	**2**	1
2026	DET	9	9	199	1,000	5.0	30	11	41	384	9.4	50	2	**2**	**2**
Career		58	33	874	4,580	5.2	78	50	222	1,833	8.3	54	12	7	5

==== Postseason ====
Year	Team	Games		Rushing					Receiving					Fumbles	
Year	Team	GP	GS	Att	Yds	Avg	Lng	TD	Rec	Yds	Avg	Lng	TD	Fum	Lost
2023	DET	3	0	**29**	**144**	5.0	31	**3**	**11**	94	8.5	20	0	**1**	**1**
2024	DET	1	0	14	105	**7.5**	**33**	2	6	70	**11.7**	**23**	0	0	0
Career		4	0	43	249	5.8	33	5	17	164	9.6	23	0	1	1

=== College ===
Season	Team	Games		Rushing				Receiving				Returning			
Season	Team	GP	GS	Att	Yds	Avg	TD	Rec	Yds	Avg	TD	Ret	Yds	Avg	TD
2020	Georgia Tech	7	7	89	460	5.2	4	24	303	12.6	**3**	8	205	**25.6**	0
2021	Georgia Tech	12	12	143	746	5.2	4	35	**465**	**13.3**	2	**23**	**589**	**25.6**	**1**
2022	Alabama	12	12	**151**	**926**	**6.1**	**7**	**44**	444	10.1	**3**	13	258	23.9	0
Career		31	31	383	2,132	5.6	15	103	1,212	11.8	8	44	1,052	23.9	1
