= Jalen Camp =

American football player (born 1998)

Profile
- Position: Wide receiver

Personal information
- Born: July 10, 1998 (age 28); Cumming, Georgia, U.S.
- Listed height: 6 ft 2 in (1.88 m)
- Listed weight: 220 lb (100 kg)

Career information
- High school: South Forsyth (Cumming)
- College: Georgia Tech (2016–2020)
- NFL draft: 2021: 6th round, 209th overall pick

Career history
- Jacksonville Jaguars (2021)*; Houston Texans (2021–2022); Pittsburgh Steelers (2023)*; Carolina Panthers (2023)*; Cleveland Browns (2024)*; Birmingham Stallions (2025)
- * Offseason or practice squad member only

Career NFL statistics
- Receptions: 1
- Receiving yards: 7
- Stats at Pro Football Reference

Jalen Camp (born July 10, 1998) is an American professional football wide receiver. He played college football at Georgia Tech.

== College career ==
Camp played college football at Georgia Tech under coaches Paul Johnson and Geoff Collins. He finished his career at Georgia Tech with 48 receptions for 808 yards and five touchdowns in 48 career games.

== Professional career ==
Pre-draft measurables
Height	Weight	Arm length	Hand span	40-yard dash	10-yard split	20-yard split	20-yard shuttle	Three-cone drill	Vertical jump	Broad jump	Bench press
6 ft 1 7/8 in (1.88 m)	226 lb (103 kg)	33 3/4 in (0.86 m)	9 5/8 in (0.24 m)	4.48 s	1.56 s	2.63 s	4.14 s	7.00 s	39.5 in (1.00 m)	10 ft 5 in (3.18 m)	29 reps
All values from Pro Day

=== Jacksonville Jaguars ===
Camp was selected by the Jacksonville Jaguars in the sixth round with the 209th overall pick in the 2021 NFL draft. Camp signed his four-year rookie contract with Jacksonville on May 17. He was waived on August 31, 2021.

=== Houston Texans ===
On September 3, 2021, Camp was signed to the practice squad of the Houston Texans. On December 26, Camp made his NFL debut in the Texans' week 16 game against the Los Angeles Chargers. He signed a reserve/future contract with the Texans on January 11, 2022.

On August 30, 2022, Camp was waived by the Texans and signed to the practice squad the next day. He was elevated to the active roster on October 29 ahead of a matchup with the Tennessee Titans. He signed a reserve/future contract on January 12, 2023.

On August 29, 2023, Camp was waived by the Texans.

=== Pittsburgh Steelers ===
On September 27, 2023, Camp signed with the practice squad of the Pittsburgh Steelers. He was released from the practice squad on October 3.

=== Carolina Panthers ===
On December 6, 2023, Camp was signed to the Carolina Panthers' practice squad. He signed a reserve/future contract with Carolina on January 8, 2024. Camp was waived by the Panthers on May 10.

=== Cleveland Browns ===
On May 14, 2024, Camp signed with the Cleveland Browns. He was waived on August 6.

=== Birmingham Stallions ===
On January 16, 2025, Camp signed with the Birmingham Stallions of the United Football League (UFL).
