= Jeff Popovich =

American football player and coach (born 1977)

Western Michigan Broncos
- Title: Special teams coordinator

Personal information
- Born: October 26, 1977 (age 49); Jefferson County, Kentucky, U.S.

Career information
- High school: Tucson (AZ) Sabino
- College: Miami (FL)
- NFL draft: 2000: undrafted

Career history

Playing
- Tampa Bay Buccaneers (2000)*; Barcelona Dragons (2001); Atlanta Falcons (2001)*
- * Offseason or practice squad member only

Coaching
- Miami (FL) (2005–2006) Graduate assistant; FIU (2007–2011) Defensive backs coach; FIU (2012) Special teams coordinator/defensive backs coach; UTSA (2013–2015) Cornerbacks coach; Indianapolis Colts (2016) Assistant to the head coach; Indianapolis Colts (2017) Defensive quality control assistant; Boise State (2018) Cornerbacks coach; Georgia Tech (2019–2021) Co-special teams coordinator/cornerbacks coach; Louisville (2022) Analyst; Western Michigan (2023–present) Special teams coordinator

Jeff Popovich (born October 26, 1977) is an American football coach and former defensive back who is the assistant head coach, special teams coordinator, and co-defensive coordinator for the Western Michigan Broncos. He is also a former model who appeared on the cover of the Abercrombie & Fitch Summer 1999 Quarterly and competed in the first season of The Bachelorette.

== Playing career ==
=== College playing career ===
Popovich was a walk-on at the University of Miami who turned into a major contributor on special teams and in nickel packages on defense. Originally starting his college career as a wide receiver after being a quarterback and defensive back in high school, Popovich was converted into a defensive back and was a star on special teams cover units and as a holder, lettering all four years at Miami.

Popovich played in all 46 games, starting 11 times. During his college career, he made 154 tackles, one interception, forced one fumble and recovered three. He was a three-time BIG EAST All-Academic team member as well as a candidate for national Academic All-America honors.

"Popovich is like Steve Tasker of the Buffalo Bills," said Butch Davis, head football coach of the nationally ranked Miami Hurricanes. "He's a terrific little athlete with a tremendous amount of fire.”

=== Professional playing career ===
After leaving Miami, Popovich played for the Tampa Bay Buccaneers during the 2000 preseason and for the Atlanta Falcons in 2001. In spring 2001, he was a member of the Barcelona Dragons team in the NFL Europe League that played in the World Bowl.

== Coaching career ==
=== Early coaching career ===
He began his coaching career at his alma mater (Miami) working as a graduate assistant from 2005-2006. In 2007 He moved on to Florida International University where he served as defensive backs coach and in his final season with the team, the special teams coordinator. After 6 years at FIU, in 2013 Jeff starting a three-year stint as cornerbacks coach at the University of Texas at San Antonio.

=== Indianapolis Colts ===
This was followed by two seasons with the Indianapolis Colts of the NFL under head Coach Chuck Pagano who was his position coach when he played at Miami. In 2016 he served as an assistant to head coach, then in 2017 as a defensive quality control assistant.

=== Boise State ===
He spent 2018 as the cornerbacks coach at Boise State. In his lone season on Boise State’s staff, the Broncos ranked among the nation’s top 40 teams in third-down defense (.311), takeaways (24), scoring defense (22.1 ppg) and total defense (355.9 ypg).

=== Georgia Tech ===
Jeff joined Georgia Tech in 2019 under head coach Geoff Collins who had previously coached with in 2010, as the team’s cornerbacks coach and defensive special teams coordinator (kickoff and punt coverage).

In his first season as Yellow Jackets’ cornerbacks coach, Popovich mentored an all-ACC selection in CB Tre Swilling. As defensive special teams coordinator, he oversaw a unit that blocked three kicks (tied for most in the ACC and 14th nationally) and improved its average kickoff return allowed by nearly six yards over the previous season (from 26.27 ypr in 2018 to 20.91 ypr in 2019).

On November 28, 2021 Jeff was fired by Georgia Tech.
