= Tom Werme =

American sports announcer

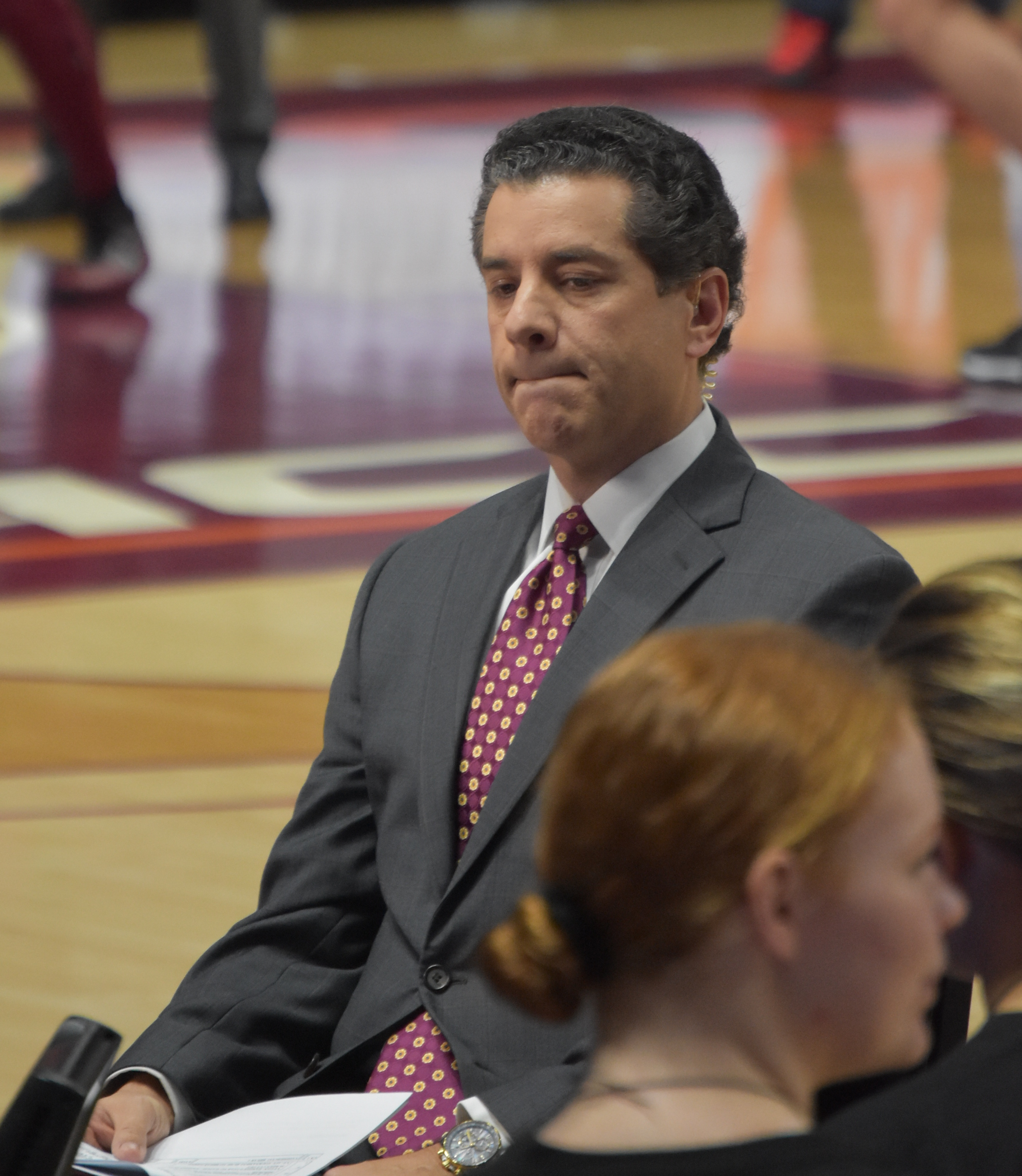
Werme in 2020

Tom Werme is an American television sports announcer who currently calls ACC College Basketball and Football for The CW broadcasts produced by Raycom Sports and Major League Lacrosse games for the Charlotte Hounds on ESPN3.

== Biography ==
Werme calls football and basketball for the Big Ten Network and has done similar roles with the ESPN family, Fox Sports South, and Raycom Sports. He was also the sideline reporter and the pregame/halftime/postgame host for Oklahoma City Thunder telecasts and performed the same position with the Charlotte Hornets. He has also done games for Fox College Sports. In 2009 in his NBA debut, Werme said, "I'm very excited to be back in the NBA, especially with an organization and that is young and fresh with a bright future." He formely worked with studio analyst Elissa Campbell, play-by-play man Brian Davis, TV color analyst Grant Long, and radio broadcaster Matt Pinto as part of the crew of Oklahoma City Thunder broadcasts. He calls Charlotte Hounds games for ESPN3 along with college football, basketball, and NBA basketball and is employed by the PGA Tour Radio on PGA.com. Werme is a graduate of Syracuse University
