= Jason Semore =

American football player and coach

Biographical details
- Education: Adams State University (2005); University of Phoenix (2007); University of Tulsa (2012)

Playing career
- 2001–2005: Adams State
- Position: Linebacker

Coaching career (HC unless noted)
- 2006: Round Valley HS (AZ) (DC)
- 2007: Colorado Mines (secondary)
- 2008–2009: Adams State (co-DC/secondary/STC)
- 2010–2011: Tulsa (OLB)
- 2012–2013: Oklahoma State (DA)
- 2014: Colorado Mines (DC)
- 2015: Montana (STC/secondary)
- 2016–2017: Montana (DC)
- 2018: Temple (SDA)
- 2019–2020: Georgia Tech (DA)
- 2021: Valdosta State (DC)
- 2022: Georgia Tech (LB)
- 2023–2024: Marshall (DC)
- 2025: Southern Miss (DC/LB)
- 2026: Georgia Tech (DC)

Jason Semore is an American football coach who most recently served as the defensive coordinator for the Georgia Tech Yellow Jackets.

== College career ==
Semore played college football for five years as a linebacker at Division II Adams State from 2001 to 2005.

== Coaching career ==
Semore began his coaching career in 2006, when he was hired as the defensive coordinator at Round Valley High School under his father Russ Semore. He got his first collegiate job in 2007 as the secondary coach for Colorado Mines. Semore got his first defensive coordinator role in 2008 as the co-defensive coordinator and special teams coordinator at his alma mater, Adams State. In 2010, he was hired as the linebackers coach at Tulsa. In 2012, Semore joined Oklahoma State as a defensive analyst. After two seasons, he was hired as the defensive coordinator at Colorado Mines. After one season, Semore was hired as the special teams coordinator and secondary coach for Montana. Ahead of the 2016 season, he was promoted to serve as Montana's defensive coordinator. Before the start of the 2018 season, Semore was hired as a defensive analyst at Temple. After one season with Temple, he joined Georgia Tech in the same role. For the 2021 season, Semore was hired by Valdosta State to serve as the team's defensive coordinator. In 2022, he was hired as the linebackers coach for Georgia Tech. In 2023, he joined Marshall to be the team's defensive coordinator. Ahead of the 2025 season, Semore followed head coach Charles Huff to Southern Miss to be the team's defensive coordinator and linebackers coach. After one season at Southern Miss, he was hired as the defensive coordinator at Memphis. However, after just a few weeks, Semore left to return to Georgia Tech as the team's defensive coordinator.
