= Andrew Thacker =

American football player and coach (born 1985)

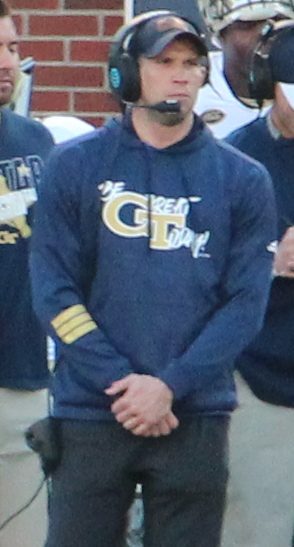
- Thacker in 2019

Current position
- Title: Nickels coach
- Team: Georgia
- Conference: SEC

Biographical details
- Born: May 31, 1985 (age 41); Cartersville, Georgia, U.S.

Playing career
- 2004–2007: Furman
- Position: Defensive back

Coaching career (HC unless noted)
- 2008–2009: UCF (GA)
- 2010–2012: Oklahoma State (GA)
- 2013: Southern Miss (S)
- 2014: Atlanta Falcons (assistant)
- 2015: UCF (S)
- 2016: Kennesaw State (LB)
- 2017: Temple (LB)
- 2018: Temple (DC)
- 2019–2023: Georgia Tech (DC)
- 2023: Georgia Tech (S)
- 2024: Georgia (defensive analyst)
- 2025–present: Georgia (nickels/stars)

Andrew Thacker (born May 31, 1985) is an American football coach. He is currently the nickels and stars coach at the University of Georgia. After a standout high school career at North Forsyth High School in Cumming, Georgia and Gainesville High School in Gainesville, Georgia, Thacker attended and played college football at Furman University (2004–2007), where he was a three-year starter at safety. Thacker was the Southern Conference's Freshman of the Year in 2004 and went 35–15 during his time as a Paladin.

== Coaching career ==
After graduating from Furman, Thacker coached at UCF, Oklahoma State, Southern Miss, the NFL's Atlanta Falcons, Kennesaw State and back at UCF before becoming Temple's linebacker coach underneath Geoff Collins in 2017. After a year as linebackers coach, Thacker was promoted to defensive coordinator in 2018. In 2019, he went with Geoff Collins to Georgia Tech as defensive coordinator until he was demoted to safeties coach in 2023. On December 7, 2023, Thacker and another coach were relieved of their coaching duties.

On August 30, 2024, it was announced that he had joined the staff as an analyst at Georgia.
