= Geoff Collins (American football) =

American football player and coach (born 1971)

Biographical details
- Born: April 10, 1971 (age 55); Conyers, Georgia, U.S.

Playing career
- 1989–1992: Western Carolina
- Position: Linebacker

Coaching career (HC unless noted)
- 1993–1994: Western Carolina (assistant)
- 1995: Franklin HS (NC) (assistant)
- 1996: Fordham (LB)
- 1997–1998: Albright (DC)
- 1999–2001: Georgia Tech (GA)
- 2002–2005: Western Carolina (DC)
- 2006: Georgia Tech (RC)
- 2007: Alabama (DPP)
- 2008–2009: UCF (LB/RC)
- 2010: FIU (DC)
- 2011–2012: Mississippi State (co-DC)
- 2013–2014: Mississippi State (DC)
- 2015–2016: Florida (DC)
- 2017–2018: Temple
- 2019–2022: Georgia Tech
- 2024: North Carolina (DC)
- 2025–2026: South Carolina (assistant)

Head coaching record
- Overall: 25–38
- Bowls: 1–0

William Geoffrey Collins (born April 10, 1971) is an American college football coach and former player. He was senior defensive assistant coach for South Carolina in the 2025–2026 season, after serving as head coach at Georgia Tech from 2018 until 2022, and head coach at Temple University from 2017 until 2018. He previously served as the defensive coordinator for Florida, Mississippi State, and North Carolina. He was nominated for the Broyles Award at three different schools, Florida International University in 2010, MSU in 2014, and UF in 2015.

== Coaching career ==
=== Early career ===
Collins graduated from Rockdale County High School in Conyers, Georgia, where he played for coach and mentor Jeff Beggs. He went on to play football at Western Carolina University. Following his graduation, Collins served as a student assistant at Western Carolina, his alma mater, during the 1993 and 1994 seasons. Following a year coaching high school, Collins became the linebacker coach for Fordham in 1996 before becoming the defensive coordinator at Albright College from 1997 through 1998. Collins left Albright to become a graduate assistant at Georgia Tech under George O'Leary for the 1999 and 2000 seasons. Following two years in the GA position, Georgia Tech promoted Collins to tight ends coach at for the 2001 season. Collins returned to his alma mater to become Western Carolina's defensive coordinator from 2002 through 2005 before returning to Georgia Tech in 2006 as the director of player personnel through 2007. After a year at Alabama as the director of player personnel, Collins was reunited with O'Leary at UCF as linebackers coach and recruiting coordinator from 2008 through 2009.

=== FIU (2010) ===
Collins served as the defensive coordinator for Florida International during the 2010 season. Collins' defense led the Sun Belt Conference in total defense, scoring defense and turnover margin.The team won the Sun Belt Conference Football Championship Game and the Little Caesars Pizza Bowl.

=== Mississippi State (2011–2014) ===
Collins coached at Mississippi State (MSU) from 2011 through 2014. During that time, Collins coached All-American Fletcher Cox, who was drafted in the first round of the 2012 NFL draft. Upon being promoted to defensive coordinator in 2013, Collins helped lead a Bulldogs team that finished in the top five in the Southeastern Conference (SEC) in total defense, rushing defense and passing defense. Under Collins, the Bulldogs' became one of the best defenses in the conference. In 2014, Mississippi State led the SEC in sacks and had the conference's best red zone defense en route to a 10–3 record. He was nicknamed the "Minister of Mayhem" at MSU. He coached several linebackers that later went to the NFL, including Cox, Cameron Lawrence, Deontae Skinner, and Nickoe Whitley.

=== Florida (2015–2016) ===
Collins spent two years as the defensive coordinator at Florida under coach Jim McElwain. While with the Gators, Collins oversaw a defense that ranked sixth in scoring defense in 2016 and 11th in 2015. During the 2015 season, Collins' defense became just the seventh team in the last 20 years to not allow a touchdown against three FBS Power 5 schools on the road in the same season. Collins coached five Florida defensive players who were drafted in the 2016 NFL draft and produced a consensus All-American in Vernon Hargreaves. Hargreaves and safety Keanu Neal were drafted in the first round of the 2016 draft.

Florida won the SEC East division in 2015, and 2016. Following the 2015 season, Collins was a candidate to replace O'Leary as the head coach at UCF, although the position ultimately went to Scott Frost.

=== Temple (2017–2018) ===
Collins secured his first FBS head coaching job in December 2016 when he was named Matt Rhule's successor at Temple. Collins had previously worked alongside Rhule at Albright College and Western Carolina.

In Collins' first season, Temple went 7–6 and won the 2017 Gasparilla Bowl, the program's first bowl win since 2011 and just its third bowl win ever.

In his second season, the Owls started off 0–2 but finished the regular season 8–4 overall and 7–1 in conference play. The Owls qualified for the 2018 Independence Bowl as a result. Along the way, Collins surpassed Steve Addazio as the winningest Temple coach over the first two seasons of their tenure at the school. He coached Rock Ya-Sin, a second round pick in the 2019 NFL draft.

=== Georgia Tech (2019–2022) ===
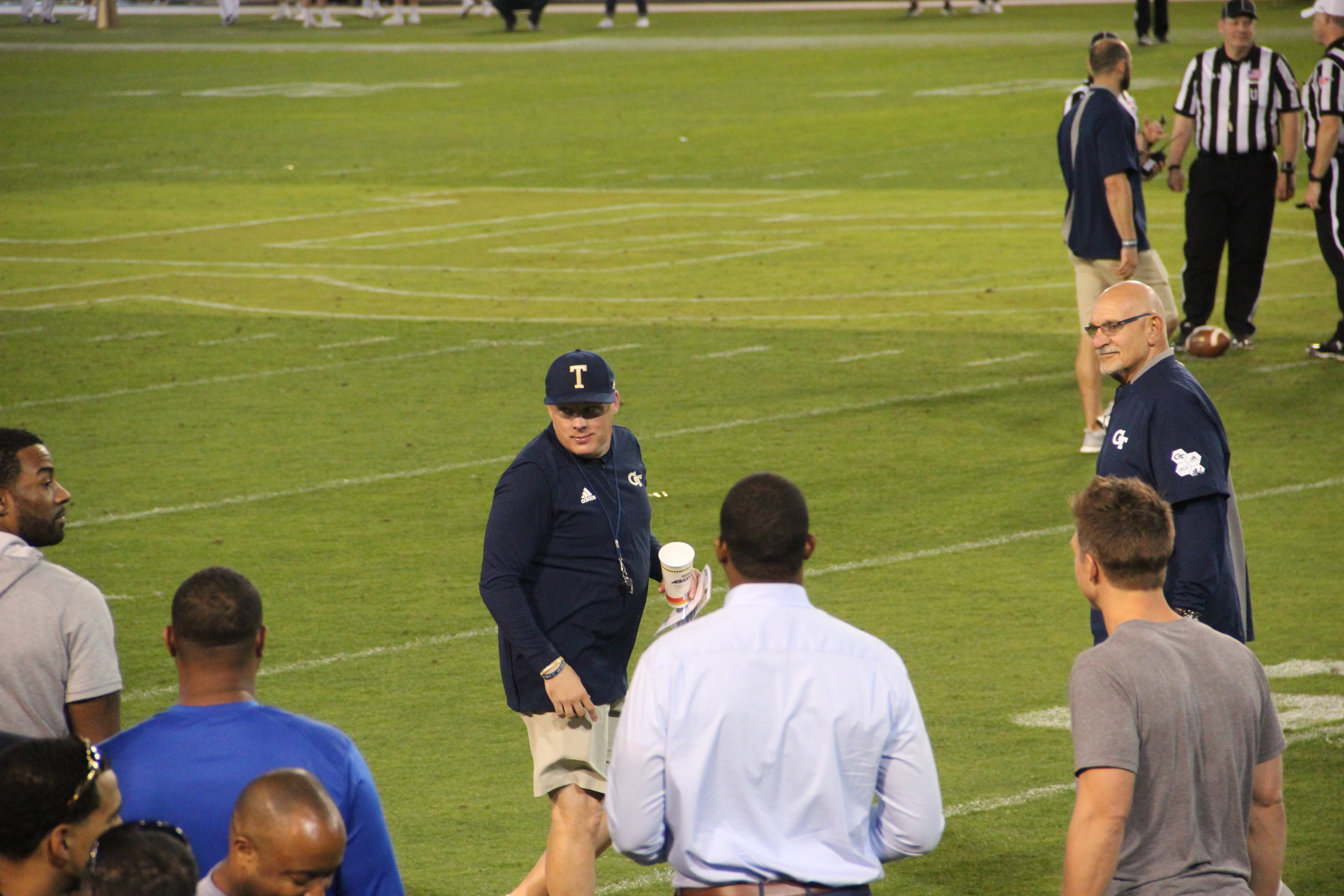
Collins on the field during Georgia Tech's spring game in 2019

On December 7, 2018, Collins was named the 20th head coach of Georgia Tech football. He coached six Yellow Jackets who were drafted by the NFL, including Tyler Davis, Jalen Camp, Pressley Harvin III, Tariq Carpenter, Keion White, Jordan Mason and Jahmyr Gibbs, as well as the free agent Nathan Cottrell.

Collins was fired by the Yellow Jackets in 2022, following the teams' 27–10 loss to Central Florida on September 24, 2022. Collins had a 10–28 record at Georgia Tech, the lowest winning percentage for a permanent head coach in the program's history. Assistant head coach Brent Key took over as interim head coach, later becoming the permanent head coach.

=== North Carolina (2024) ===
Collins was hired by Mack Brown as defensive coordinator at North Carolina, replacing Gene Chizik. After one season, Collins was not retained and was succeeded by former New England Patriots assistant Steve Belichick.

=== South Carolina (2025) ===
Collins was senior defensive assistant coach at South Carolina for the 2025–2026 season.

== Personal life ==
Collins and his wife have one daughter.

Collins coined the phrase "Money Down" to describe third and fourth downs. He started a pledge to donate to Children's Healthcare of Atlanta (CHOA) for each Money Down made by the Yellow Jackets. In 2018, he organized and participated in a blood drive for an assistant equipment manager diagnosed with leukemia. He has also been involved with The Jed Foundation.

== Head coaching record ==
Year	Team	Overall	Conference	Standing	Bowl/playoffs
Temple Owls (American Athletic Conference) (2017–2018)
2017	Temple	7–6	4–4	3rd (East)	W Gasparilla
2018	Temple	8–4	7–1	2nd (East)	Independence (Note: Collins resigned prior to the bowl game)
Temple:		15–10	11–5		
Georgia Tech Yellow Jackets (Atlantic Coast Conference) (2019–2022)
2019	Georgia Tech	3–9	2–6	7th (Coastal)	
2020	Georgia Tech	3–7	3–6	12th	
2021	Georgia Tech	3–9	2–6	6th (Coastal)	
2022	Georgia Tech	1–3 (Note: Georgia Tech fired Collins after four games)	0–1	(Coastal)	
Georgia Tech:		10–28	7–19		
Total:		25–38			
