= Georgia Tech–Virginia Tech football rivalry =

American college football rivalry

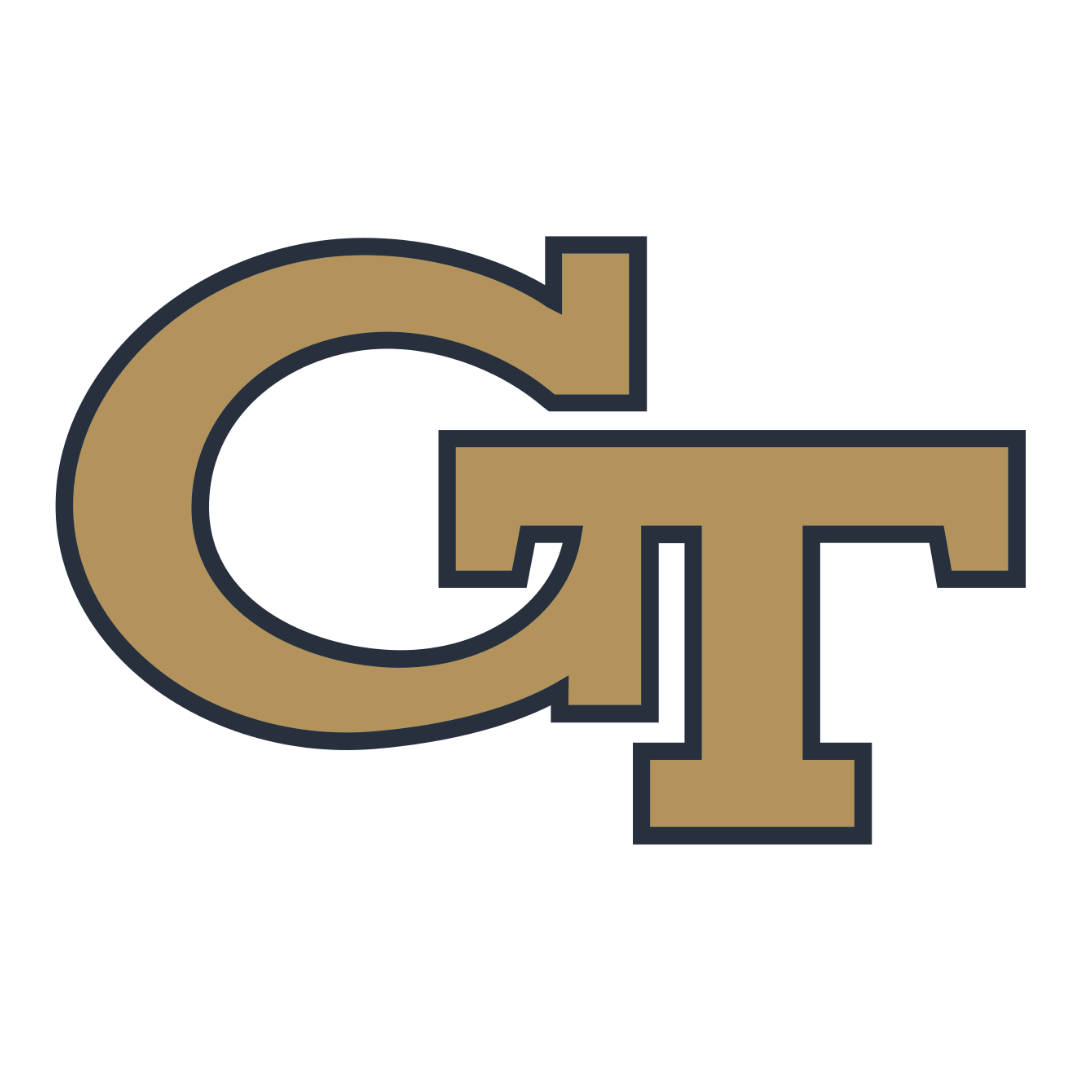
- Georgia Tech Yellow Jackets Virginia Tech Hokies
- First meeting: November 10, 1990; Georgia Tech, 6–3
- Latest meeting: October 17, 2026; Virginia Tech, 34–24
- Next meeting: 2027

Statistics
- Total meetings: 22
- All-time series: Virginia Tech leads, 13–9
- Largest victory: Virginia Tech, 45–0 (2019)
- Longest win streak: Virginia Tech, 4 (2010–2013)
- Current win streak: Virginia Tech, 1 (2026–present)

The Georgia Tech–Virginia Tech football rivalry, also known as the TechMo Bowl and Battle of the Techs, is an American college football rivalry between the Georgia Tech Yellow Jackets and Virginia Tech Hokies. Both universities are members of the Atlantic Coast Conference (ACC).

== History ==
As co-members of the Atlantic Coast Conference, Georgia Tech and Virginia Tech regularly meet in all varsity sports in which both schools field a team. Prior to the Hokies joining the ACC in 2004, the two teams had only met once previously. An additional scheduled meeting in 2000 was canceled after the teams took the field due to torrential rain and lightning. The rivalry is most pronounced on the football field, however, where the schools used to play annually in the ACC's Coastal Division, often with significant divisional implications. Between 2005 (when the ACC adopted the divisional format for football) and 2012, one of these two teams represented the ACC Coastal Division in every ACC Championship Game (Virginia Tech in 2005, 2007, 2008, 2010, 2011; Georgia Tech in 2006, 2009 and 2012).

The 2007 edition of the rivalry gained notoriety due to several Virginia Tech players' jerseys being stolen before game time. The Yellow Jackets let the Hokies borrow a few white jerseys with handwritten name plates on the back, and ad-hoc Nike swooshes being drawn on under blacked out Russell Athletic logos.

The rivalry has seen both teams come into the game ranked in the top 25, including the 2009 game in which both teams came into the game with 1 loss and the No. 19 Yellow Jackets upset the No. 4 Hokies. The 2011 game also saw both teams ranked in the BCS top 25, with the No. 10 Hokies beating the No. 20 Yellow Jackets.

Georgia Tech became the first conference opponent to win three consecutive games in Lane Stadium against Virginia Tech.

On June 28, 2022, the ACC announced that they would do away with divisions beginning in the 2023 season, with each team playing 3 permanent rivals every year and playing 5 other rotating teams. Because of this, Georgia Tech and Virginia Tech will only play each other every other year through at least 2026.

On October 30, 2023, the ACC announced opponents have been set for the 2024 to 2030 seasons with the league expanding to 17 teams. Under this new scheduling model, Georgia Tech and Virginia Tech will play each other in 2026 and 2029.

== Game results ==
Georgia Tech victories	Virginia Tech victories	Tie games

No.	Date	Location	Winner	Score
1	November 10, 1990	Atlanta, GA	#7 Georgia Tech	6–3
2	October 28, 2004	Atlanta, GA	#22 Virginia Tech	34–20
3	September 24, 2005	Blacksburg, VA	#4 Virginia Tech	51–7
4	September 30, 2006	Blacksburg, VA	Georgia Tech	38–27
5	November 1, 2007	Atlanta, GA	#13 Virginia Tech	27–3
6	September 13, 2008	Blacksburg, VA	Virginia Tech	20–17
7	October 17, 2009	Atlanta, GA	#19 Georgia Tech	28–23
8	November 4, 2010	Blacksburg, VA	Virginia Tech	28–21
9	November 10, 2011	Atlanta, GA	#10 Virginia Tech	37–26
10	September 3, 2012	Blacksburg, VA	#16 Virginia Tech	20–17^{OT}
11	September 26, 2013	Atlanta, GA	Virginia Tech	17–10
12	September 20, 2014	Blacksburg, VA	Georgia Tech	27–24
13	November 12, 2015	Atlanta, GA	Virginia Tech	23–21
14	November 12, 2016	Blacksburg, VA	Georgia Tech	30–20
15	November 11, 2017	Atlanta, GA	Georgia Tech	28–22
16	October 25, 2018	Blacksburg, VA	Georgia Tech	49–28
17	November 16, 2019	Atlanta, GA	Virginia Tech	45–0
18	October 30, 2021	Atlanta, GA	Virginia Tech	26–17
19	November 5, 2022	Blacksburg, VA	Georgia Tech	28–27
20	October 26, 2024	Blacksburg, VA	Virginia Tech	21–6
21	October 11, 2025	Atlanta, GA	#13 Georgia Tech	35–20
22	October 17, 2026	Blacksburg, VA	Virginia Tech	34–24
Series: Virginia Tech leads 13–9

== See also ==
- List of NCAA college football rivalry games
