= Pittsburgh Panthers football statistical leaders =

The Pittsburgh Panthers football statistical leaders are individual statistical leaders of the Pittsburgh Panthers football program in various categories, including passing, rushing, receiving, total offense, defensive stats, kicking, and scoring. Within those areas, the lists identify single-game, single-season, and career leaders. The Panthers represent University of Pittsburgh in the NCAA's Atlantic Coast Conference.

Although Pittsburgh began competing in intercollegiate football in 1890, the school's official record book considers the "modern era" to have begun in the 1950s. Records from before this year are often incomplete and inconsistent, and they are generally not included in these lists.

These lists are dominated by more recent players for several reasons:

- Since the 1950s, seasons have increased from 10 games to 11 and then 12 games in length.
- The NCAA didn't allow freshmen to play varsity football until 1972 (with the exception of the World War II years), allowing players to have four-year careers.
- The NCAA only began counting bowl games toward single-season and career statistics in 2002, and most programs follow this practice. Pitt does not; its official record books include all postseason performances. The Panthers have played in 15 bowl games since the NCAA's policy change, giving many recent players an extra game to accumulate NCAA-recognized statistics.
- Pitt played in the ACC Championship Game in 2018 and 2021, giving players in those seasons yet another game in which to accumulate statistics.
- Due to COVID-19, the NCAA ruled that the 2020 season would not count against the athletic eligibility of any football player, giving all players who appeared in that season five years of eligibility instead of the normal four.

These lists are updated through the 2025 season. Note that Pittsburgh's official media guide does not give a full top 10 in many of these categories.

== Passing ==
=== Passing yards ===
Career
Rank	Player	Yards	Years
1	Kenny Pickett	12,303	2017 2018 2019 2020 2021
2	Alex Van Pelt	11,267	1989 1990 1991 1992
3	Dan Marino	8,597	1979 1980 1981 1982
4	Tino Sunseri	8,590	2009 2010 2011 2012
5	Tyler Palko	8,343	2002 2004 2005 2006
6	Rod Rutherford	6,724	2000 2001 2002 2003
7	John Congemi	6,467	1983 1984 1985 1986
8	Bill Stull	5,252	2005 2006 2007 2008 2009
9	Nathan Peterman	5,142	2015 2016
10	David Priestley	4,533	1999 2000 2001

Single season
Rank	Player	Yards	Year
1	Kenny Pickett	4,319	2021
2	Rod Rutherford	3,679	2003
3	Tino Sunseri	3,288	2012
4	Alex Van Pelt	3,163	1992
5	Kenny Pickett	3,098	2019
6	Tyler Palko	3,067	2004
7	Tom Savage	2,958	2013
8	Alex Van Pelt	2,881	1989
9	Dan Marino	2,876	1981
10	Tyler Palko	2,871	2006

Single game
Rank	Player	Yards	Year	Opponent
1	Kenny Pickett	519	2021	Miami
2	Pete Gonzalez	470	1997	Rutgers
3	Mason Heintschel	453	2026	Miami (OH)
4	John Congemi	446	1986	Navy
5	John Ryan	433	1994	West Virginia
6	Tom Savage	424	2013	Duke
7	Mason Heintschel	423	2025	NC State
8	Rod Rutherford	419	2003	West Virginia
	Tino Sunseri	419	2011	Connecticut
10	Kenny Pickett	416	2021	Duke

=== Passing touchdowns ===
Career
Rank	Player	TDs	Years
1	Kenny Pickett	81	2017 2018 2019 2020 2021
2	Dan Marino	79	1979 1980 1981 1982
3	Tyler Palko	66	2002 2004 2005 2006
4	Alex Van Pelt	64	1989 1990 1991 1992
5	Rod Rutherford	60	2000 2001 2002 2003
6	Tino Sunseri	49	2009 2010 2011 2012
7	Nathan Peterman	47	2015 2016
8	John Congemi	42	1983 1984 1985 1986
9	Pete Gonzalez	36	1993 1994 1995 1996 1997
10	John Ryan	32	1992 1993 1994 1995
	Bill Stull	32	2005 2006 2007 2008 2009

Single season
Rank	Player	TDs	Year
1	Kenny Pickett	42	2021
2	Dan Marino	37	1981
	Rod Rutherford	37	2003
4	Pete Gonzalez	30	1997
5	Nathan Peterman	27	2016
6	Tyler Palko	25	2006
7	Tyler Palko	24	2004
8	Rod Rutherford	22	2002
9	Bill Stull	21	2009
	Tino Sunseri	21	2012
	Tom Savage	21	2013

Single game
Rank	Player	TDs	Year	Opponent
1	Pete Gonzalez	7	1997	Rutgers
	Mason Heintschel	7	2026	Miami (OH)
3	Dan Marino	6	1981	South Carolina
	Tom Savage	6	2013	Duke
	Kenny Pickett	6	2021	Western Michigan
	Mason Heintschel	6	2026	Bucknell
7	Matt Cavanaugh	5	1976	Duke
	John Congemi	5	1986	Navy
	John Turman	5	2000	Boston College
	Rod Rutherford	5	2003	Texas A&M
	Tyler Palko	5	2004	Notre Dame
	Tyler Palko	5	2004	South Florida
	Nathan Peterman	5	2016	Clemson
	Kenny Pickett	5	2021	New Hampshire

== Rushing ==
=== Rushing yards ===
Career
Rank	Player	Yards	Years
1	Tony Dorsett	6,526	1973 1974 1975 1976
2	James Conner	3,733	2013 2014 2015 2016
3	Ray Graham	3,271	2009 2010 2011 2012
4	Curvin Richards	3,192	1988 1989 1990
5	Craig Heyward	3,086	1984 1986 1987
6	Dion Lewis	2,860	2009 2010
7	Qadree Ollison	2,859	2015 2016 2017 2018
8	LeSean McCoy	2,816	2007 2008
9	Billy West	2,803	1993 1994 1995 1996 1997
10	Elliott Walker	2,748	1974 1975 1976 1977

Single season
Rank	Player	Yards	Year
1	Tony Dorsett	2,150	1976
2	Dion Lewis	1,799	2009
3	Craig Heyward	1,791	1987
4	James Conner	1,765	2014
5	Tony Dorsett	1,686	1973
	Tony Dorsett	1,686	1975
7	LeSean McCoy	1,488	2008
8	Israel Abanikanda	1,431	2022
9	Billy West	1,358	1994
10	LeSean McCoy	1,328	2007

Single game
Rank	Player	Yards	Year	Opponent
1	Israel Abanikanda	320	2022	Virginia Tech
2	Tony Dorsett	303	1975	Notre Dame
3	Ray Graham	277	2010	FIU
4	Kevan Barlow	272	2000	West Virginia
5	Tony Dorsett	268	1975	Army
6	Tony Dorsett	265	1973	Northwestern
7	Curvin Richards	264	1989	East Carolina
8	James Conner	263	2014	Duke
9	Dion Lewis	261	2010	Cincinnati
10	Craig Heyward	259	1987	Kent State

=== Rushing touchdowns ===
Career
Rank	Player	TDs	Years
1	Tony Dorsett	58	1973 1974 1975 1976
2	James Conner	52	2013 2014 2015 2016
3	LeSean McCoy	35	2007 2008
4	Ray Graham	32	2009 2010 2011 2012
5	Dion Lewis	30	2009 2010
6	Qadree Ollison	29	2015 2016 2017 2018
7	Israel Abanikanda	28	2020 2021 2022
	Elliott Walker	28	1974 1975 1976 1977
9	Craig Heyward	24	1984 1986 1987
10	Darrin Hall	21	2015 2016 2017 2018

Single season
Rank	Player	TDs	Year
1	James Conner	26	2014
2	Tony Dorsett	21	1976
	LeSean McCoy	21	2008
4	Israel Abanikanda	20	2022
5	Dion Lewis	17	2009
6	James Conner	16	2016
7	LeSean McCoy	14	2007
8	Dion Lewis	13	2010
9	Tony Dorsett	12	1973
	Elliott Walker	12	1977

Single game
Rank	Player	TDs	Year	Opponent
1	Israel Abanikanda	6	2022	Virginia Tech
	Norman "Bill" Budd	6	1910	Ohio
3	Israel Abanikanda	4	2022	Rhode Island
	Kevan Barlow	4	2000	West Virginia
	James Conner	4	2014	Delaware
	James Conner	4	2014	North Carolina
	Darrin Hall	4	2017	North Carolina
	Dion Lewis	4	2010	Cincinnati
	LeSean McCoy	4	2008	Rutgers
10	20 times by 10 players	3	Most recent: Israel Abanikanda, 2022 vs. North Carolina	

== Receiving ==
=== Receptions ===
Career
Rank	Player	Rec	Years
1	Tyler Boyd	254	2013 2014 2015
2	Devin Street	202	2010 2011 2012 2013
3	Latef Grim	178	1998 1999 2000
4	Antonio Bryant	173	1999 2000 2001
5	Larry Fitzgerald	161	2002 2003
6	Jordan Addison	160	2020 2021
	Dietrich Jells	160	1991 1992 1993 1994
8	Mike Shanahan	159	2009 2010 2011 2012
9	Maurice Ffrench	156	2017 2018 2019
10	Konata Mumpfield	154	2022 2023 2024

Single season
Rank	Player	Rec	Year
1	Jordan Addison	100	2021
2	Maurice Ffrench	96	2019
3	Larry Fitzgerald	92	2003
4	Tyler Boyd	91	2015
5	Tyler Boyd	85	2013
6	Tyler Boyd	78	2014
7	Latef Grim	75	1999
8	Antonio Bryant	73	2000
	Devin Street	73	2012
10	Larry Fitzgerald	69	2002
	Jake Hoffart	69	1997

Single game
Rank	Player	Rec	Year	Opponent
1	Harry Orszulak	16	1968	Penn State
2	D. J. Turner	15	2020	Virginia Tech
3	Jordan Addison	14	2021	Virginia
4	Antonio Bryant	13	1999	Virginia Tech
5	Tyler Boyd	12	2015	Syracuse
	Maurice Ffrench	12	2019	Eastern Michigan
	Larry Fitzgerald	12	2003	Toledo
	Latef Grim	12	1999	Virginia Tech
	Jake Hoffart	12	1997	Rutgers
	Taysir Mack	12	2019	Penn State
	Reggie Williams	12	1986	NC State

=== Receiving yards ===
Career
Rank	Player	Yards	Years
1	Tyler Boyd	3,361	2013 2014 2015
2	Antonio Bryant	3,061	1999 2000 2001
3	Dietrich Jells	3,003	1991 1992 1993 1994 1995
4	Devin Street	2,901	2010 2011 2012 2013
5	Latef Grim	2,680	1998 1999 2000
6	Larry Fitzgerald	2,677	2002 2003
7	Greg Lee	2,470	2003 2004 2005
8	Jon Baldwin	2,337	2008 2009 2010
9	Jared Wayne	2,313	2019 2020 2021 2022
10	Mike Shanahan	2,276	2009 2010 2011 2012

Single season
Rank	Player	Yards	Year
1	Larry Fitzgerald	1,672	2003
2	Jordan Addison	1,593	2021
3	Antonio Bryant	1,457	2000
4	Greg Lee	1,297	2004
5	Tyler Boyd	1,261	2014
6	Tyler Boyd	1,174	2013
7	Jon Baldwin	1,111	2009
8	Latef Grim	1,106	1999
9	Dietrich Jells	1,091	1992
10	Jared Wayne	1,068	2022

Single game
Rank	Player	Yards	Year	Opponent
1	Dietrich Jells	225	1994	West Virginia
2	Antonio Bryant	222	2000	Boston College
3	Antonio Bryant	215	1999	Virginia Tech
4	Antonio Bryant	212	2000	North Carolina
5	Larry Fitzgerald	207	2003	Rutgers
6	Jared Wayne	205	2022	Miami
7	Jordan Addison	202	2021	Virginia
8	Larry Fitzgerald	201	2003	Toledo
9	Latef Grim	192	1998	Villanova
10	Latef Grim	188	1999	Virginia Tech

=== Receiving touchdowns ===
Career
Rank	Player	TDs	Years
1	Larry Fitzgerald	34	2002 2003
2	Antonio Bryant	26	1999 2000 2001
3	Dietrich Jells	25	1991 1992 1993 1994 1995
4	Dwight Collins	24	1980 1981 1982 1983
5	Julius Dawkins	23	1979 1980 1981 1982
6	Jordan Addison	21	2020 2021
	Tyler Boyd	21	2013 2014 2015
	Gordon Jones	21	1975 1976 1977 1978
9	Greg Lee	17	2003 2004 2005
	Bill Wallace	17	1981 1982 1983 1984

Single season
Rank	Player	TDs	Year
1	Larry Fitzgerald	22	2003
2	Jordan Addison	17	2021
3	Julius Dawkins	16	1981
4	Terry Murphy	13	1997
5	Larry Fitzgerald	12	2002
6	Antonio Bryant	11	2000
7	Dwight Collins	10	1980
	Dorin Dickerson	10	2009
	Greg Lee	10	2004
	Jester Weah	10	2016

Single game
Rank	Player	TDs	Year	Opponent
1	Jordan Addison	4	2021	Virginia
	Billy Davis	4	1994	Rutgers
	Julius Dawkins	4	1981	Cincinnati
	Julius Dawkins	4	1981	Army
5	22 times by 16 players	3	Most recent: Censere Lee, 2026 vs. Bucknell	

== Total offense ==
Total offense is the sum of passing and rushing statistics. It does not include receiving or returns.

=== Total offense yards ===
Career
Rank	Player	Yards	Years
1	Kenny Pickett	13,104	2017 2018 2019 2020 2021
2	Alex Van Pelt	11,148	1989 1990 1991 1992
3	Tino Sunseri	8,591	2009 2010 2011 2012
4	Tyler Palko	8,429	2002 2004 2005 2006
5	Dan Marino	8,320	1979 1980 1981 1982
6	Rod Rutherford	7,609	2000 2001 2002 2003
7	Tony Dorsett	6,526	1973 1974 1975 1976
8	John Congemi	6,351	1983 1984 1985 1986
9	Nathan Peterman	5,660	2015 2016
10	Bill Stull	5,064	2005 2006 2007 2008 2009

Single season
Rank	Player	Yards	Year
1	Kenny Pickett	4,552	2021
2	Rod Rutherford	3,829	2003

Single game
Rank	Player	Yards	Year	Opponent
1	Kenny Pickett	509	2021	Miami
2	Pete Gonzalez	479	1997	Rutgers

=== Touchdowns responsible for ===
"Touchdowns responsible for" is the NCAA's official term for combined passing and rushing touchdowns.

Career
Rank	Player	TDs	Years
1	Kenny Pickett	101	2017 2018 2019 2020 2021
2	Dan Marino	82	1979 1980 1981 1982
3	Tyler Palko	78	2002 2004 2005 2006
4	Rod Rutherford	74	2000 2001 2002 2003
5	Alex Van Pelt	70	1989 1990 1991 1992
6	Tony Dorsett	59	1973 1974 1975 1976
7	James Conner	56	2013 2014 2015 2016
	Tino Sunseri	56	2009 2010 2011 2012
9	John Congemi	52	1983 1984 1985 1986
10	Nathan Peterman	51	2015 2016

== Defense ==
=== Interceptions ===
Career
Rank	Player	Ints	Years
1	Bob Jury	21	1974 1975 1976 1977

Single season
Rank	Player	Ints	Year
1	Bob Jury	10	1976
2	Bob Jury	8	1977
3	Billy Reynolds	7	1950

Single game
Rank	Player	Ints	Year	Opponent
1	Lou Cecconi	3	1949	Penn State
	Henry Ford	3	1953	Penn State
	Willie Marsh	3	1978	Tulane
	Shawntae Spencer	3	2002	Ohio

=== Tackles ===
Career
Rank	Player	Tackles	Years
1	Arnie Weatherington	477	1973 1974 1975 1976
2	Hugh Green	441	1977 1978 1979 1980
3	H. B. Blades	433	2003 2004 2005 2006
4	Tom Tumulty	413	1991 1992 1993 1994 1995
5	Gerald Hayes	402	1999 2000 2001 2002
6	Steve Apke	368	1983 1984 1985 1986
7	Jerry Olsavsky	367	1985 1986 1987 1988
8	Tez Morris	366	2002 2003 2004 2005
9	Troy Benson	351	1981 1982 1983 1984
10	Lewis Moore	344	2000 2001 2002 2003
	Scott McKillop	344	2005 2006 2007 2008

=== Sacks ===
Career
Rank	Player	Sacks	Years
1	Hugh Green	49.0	1977 1978 1979 1980
2	Randy Holloway	33.5	1974 1975 1976 1977
3	Tony Woods	31.0	1983 1984 1985 1986
4	Aaron Donald	29.5	2010 2011 2012 2013
	Ejuan Price	29.5	2011 2013 2015 2016
6	Zeke Gadson	26.5	1984 1985 1986 1987
	Keith Hamilton	26.5	1989 1990 1991
8	Chris Doleman	25.0	1981 1982 1983 1984
9	Bryan Knight	23.5	1998 1999 2000 2001
10	Dennis Atiyeh	23.0	1983 1984 1985

Single season
Rank	Player	Sacks	Year
1	Zeke Gadson	24.5	1987

== Kicking ==
=== Field goals made (since 2000) ===
Career
Rank	Player	FGs	Years
1	Alex Kessman	69	2017 2018 2019 2020
2	Chris Blewitt	55	2013 2014 2015 2016
3	Ben Sauls	52	2020 2021 2022 2023 2024
4	Conor Lee	50	2006 2007 2008
5	Kevin Harper	41	2009 2010 2011 2012
	Dan Hutchins	41	2008 2009 2010
7	Josh Cummings	32	2004 2005
8	David Abdul	24	2002 2003 2004 2005
9	Nick Lotz	21	2000 2001
10	Trey Butkowski	20	2025

Single season
Rank	Player	FGs	Year
1	Dan Hutchins	23	2009
	Alex Kessman	23	2020
3	Alex Kessman	22	2019
4	Kevin Harper	21	2011
	Ben Sauls	21	2024
6	Kevin Harper	20	2012
	Conor Lee	20	2008
	Ben Sauls	20	2022
	Trey Butkowski	20	2025
10	Josh Cummings	18	2004
	Dan Hutchins	18	2010
	Conor Lee	18	2007

Single game
Rank	Player	FGs	Year	Opponent
1	Conor Lee	5	2008	Notre Dame
	Ben Sauls	5	2022	UCLA

=== Field goal percentage ===
Career
Rank	Player	FG%	Years
1	Trey Butkowski	87.0%	2025
2	Conor Lee	83.3%	2006 2007 2008

Single season
Rank	Player	FG%	Year
1	Chris Ferencik	92.3%	1995

== Scoring ==
=== Points ===
Career
Rank	Player	Points	Years
1	Tony Dorsett	380	1973 1974 1975 1976
2	Chris Blewitt	363	2013 2014 2015 2016
	Alex Kessman	363	2017 2018 2019 2020
4	James Conner	338	2002 2004 2005 2006
5	Ben Sauls	278	2020 2021 2022 2023 2024
6	Carson Long	268	1973 1974 1975 1976
7	Conor Lee	263	2006 2007 2008
8	Andy Hastings	255	1914 1915 1916 1919
9	LeSean McCoy	216	2007 2008
	Ray Graham	216	2009 2010 2011 2012

Single season
Rank	Player	Points	Year
1	James Conner	156	2014

Single game
Rank	Player	Points	Year	Opponent
1	Israel Abanikanda	30	2022	Virginia Tech
	Norman "Bill" Budd	30	1910	Ohio

=== Touchdowns ===
In official NCAA statistics, touchdown totals include touchdowns scored. Accordingly, these lists include rushing, receiving, and return touchdowns, but not passing touchdowns

Career
Rank	Player	TDs	Years
1	Tony Dorsett	63	1973 1974 1975 1976
2	James Conner	56	2013 2014 2015 2016
3	LeSean McCoy	36	2007 2008
	Ray Graham	36	2009 2010 2011 2012
5	Larry Fitzgerald	34	2002 2003
6	Qadree Ollison	32	2015 2016 2017 2018
	Israel Abanikanda	32	2020 2021 2022
8	Dion Lewis	31	2009 2010
9	Elliott Walker	28	1974 1975 1976 1977
10	Antonio Bryant	26	1999 2000 2001

Single season
Rank	Player	TDs	Year
1	James Conner	26	2014

Single game
Rank	Player	TDs	Year	Opponent
1	Israel Abanikanda	6	2022	Virginia Tech
	Norman "Bill" Budd	6	1910	Ohio
