= 2019 Pittsburgh Panthers football team =

American college football season

2019 Pittsburgh Panthers football

Quick Lane Bowl champion

Quick Lane Bowl, W 34–30 vs. Eastern Michigan
- Conference: Atlantic Coast Conference
- Coastal Division
- Record: 8–5 (4–4 ACC)
- Head coach: Pat Narduzzi (5th season)
- Offensive coordinator: Mark Whipple (1st season)
- Offensive scheme: Pro-style
- Defensive coordinator: Randy Bates (2nd season)
- Base defense: 4–3
- Home stadium: Heinz Field

Uniform
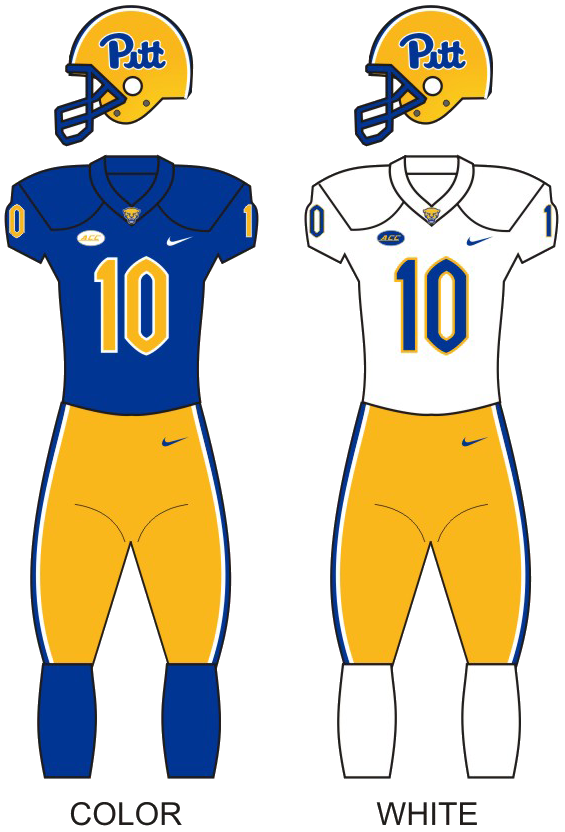

2019 Atlantic Coast Conference football standings
	Conf.			Overall
Team	W		L	W		L
Atlantic Division
No. 2 Clemson xy$^	8	–	0	14	–	1
Louisville	5	–	3	8	–	5
Wake Forest	4	–	4	8	–	5
Boston College	4	–	4	6	–	7
Florida State	4	–	4	6	–	7
Syracuse	2	–	6	5	–	7
NC State	1	–	7	4	–	8
Coastal Division
Virginia x	6	–	2	9	–	5
Virginia Tech	5	–	3	8	–	5
Pittsburgh	4	–	4	8	–	5
North Carolina	4	–	4	7	–	6
Miami (FL)	4	–	4	6	–	7
Duke	3	–	5	5	–	7
Georgia Tech	2	–	6	3	–	9
Championship: Clemson 62, Virginia 17
^ – College Football Playoff participant; $ – Conference champion; x – Division champion/co-champions; Rankings from AP Poll

The 2019 Pittsburgh Panthers football team represented the University of Pittsburgh in the 2019 NCAA Division I FBS football season. The Panthers were led by fifth-year head coach Pat Narduzzi and played their home games at Heinz Field. They competed in the Coastal Division of the Atlantic Coast Conference (ACC). This was Pitt's seventh season as a member of the ACC.

== Preseason ==
=== Preseason media poll ===
In the preseason ACC media poll, Pitt was predicted to finish in fourth in the Coastal Division.

== Schedule ==
The Panthers schedule was released on January 16, 2019.

Date	Time	Opponent	Site	TV	Result	Attendance
August 31	7:30 p.m.	Virginia	Heinz Field; Pittsburgh, PA	ACCN	L 14–30	47,144
September 7	11:00 a.m.	Ohio*	Heinz Field; Pittsburgh, PA	ACCN	W 20–10	42,168
September 14	12:00 p.m.	at No. 13 Penn State*	Beaver Stadium; University Park, PA (rivalry)	ABC	L 10–17	108,661
September 21	3:30 p.m.	No. 15 UCF*	Heinz Field; Pittsburgh, PA	ABC/ESPN2	W 35–34	42,056
September 28	12:30 p.m.	No. 20 (FCS) Delaware*	Heinz Field; Pittsburgh, PA	ACCRSN	W 17–14	44,141
October 5	8:00 p.m.	at Duke	Wallace Wade Stadium; Durham, NC	ACCN	W 33–30	22,610
October 18	7:00 p.m.	at Syracuse	Carrier Dome; Syracuse, NY (rivalry)	ESPN	W 27–20	44,886
October 26	12:00 p.m.	Miami (FL)^{†}	Heinz Field; Pittsburgh, PA	ESPN	L 12–16	47,918
November 2	4:00 p.m.	at Georgia Tech	Bobby Dodd Stadium; Atlanta, GA	ACCRSN	W 20–10	41,219
November 14	8:00 p.m.	North Carolina	Heinz Field; Pittsburgh, PA	ESPN	W 34–27 ^{OT}	39,290
November 23	3:30 p.m.	at Virginia Tech	Lane Stadium; Blacksburg, VA	ESPN2	L 0–28	55,936
November 30	3:30 p.m.	Boston College	Heinz Field; Pittsburgh, PA	ACCN	L 19–26	40,889
December 26	8:00 p.m.	vs. Eastern Michigan*	Ford Field; Detroit, MI (Quick Lane Bowl)	ESPN	W 34–30	34,765
*Non-conference game; ^{†}Homecoming; Rankings from AP Poll and CFP Rankings after November 5 released prior to game; All times are in Eastern time

== Game summaries ==
=== Virginia ===
Virginia at Pittsburgh

Team	1	2	3	4	Total
• Cavaliers	10	3	10	7	30
Panthers	0	14	0	0	14

- Date: August 31
- Location:
  Heinz Field
  Pittsburgh, PA
- Game start: 7:40 p.m. EDT
- Elapsed time: 3:08
- Game attendance: 47,144
- Game weather: 72 °F (22 °C) • Wind NE 5 mph (8.0 km/h) • Sunny
- Referee: Jeff Heaser
- TV announcers (ACCN): Adam Amin, Tim Hasselbeck, Katie George

Scoring summary
1	8:17	UVA	Delaney, B. 39 yd field goal	UVA 3–0
1	6:11	UVA	Sharp, C. 2 yd pass from Perkins, B. (Delaney kick)	UVA 10–0
2	13:29	PITT	Davis, A. 2 yd run (Alex Kessman kick)	UVA 10–7
2	10:19	UVA	Delaney 36 yd field goal	UVA 13–7
2	0:38	PITT	Tipton, T. 3 yd pass from Kenny Pickett (Kessman kick)	PITT 13–14
3	11:54	UVA	Delaney 45 yd field goal	UVA 16–14
3	8:23	UVA	Dubois, H. 13 yd pass from Perkins, B. (Delaney kick)	UVA 23–14
4	0:32	UVA	Taulapapa, W. 10 yd run (Delaney kick)	UVA 30–14

=== Ohio ===
Ohio at Pittsburgh

Team	1	2	3	4	Total
Bobcats	0	3	7	0	10
• Panthers	3	14	3	0	20

- Date: September 7
- Location:
  Heinz Field
  Pittsburgh, PA
- Game start: 11:01 a.m. EDT
- Elapsed time: 3:06
- Game attendance: 42,168
- Game weather: 67 °F (19 °C) • Wind SW 4 mph (6.4 km/h) • Partly Cloudy
- Referee: Magallanes, J.
- TV announcers (ACCN): Clay Matvick, John Congemi, Jerry Punch

Scoring summary
1	7:49	PITT	Alex Kessman 27 yd field goal	PITT 0–3
2	14:47	PITT	Ffrench, M. 74 yd pass from Kenny Pickett (Kessman kick)	PITT 0–10
2	9:28	PITT	Davis, V. 3 yd run (Kessman kick)	PITT 0–17
2	6:55	OHIO	Zervos, L. 23 yd field goal	PITT 3–17
3	6:23	PITT	Kessman 41 yd field goal	PITT 3–20
3	4:04	OHIO	Tuggle, D. 7 yd run (Zervos kick)	PITT 10–20

=== At Penn State ===
Pittsburgh at Penn State

Team	1	2	3	4	Total
Panthers	0	10	0	0	10
• No. 13 Nittany Lions	7	3	7	0	17

- Date: September 14
- Location:
  Beaver Stadium
  University Park, PA
- Game start: 12:40 p.m. EDT
- Elapsed time: 3:13
- Game attendance: 108,661
- Game weather: 66 °F (19 °C) • Wind SSW 10 mph (16 km/h) • Showers
- Referee: Riley Johnson
- TV announcers (ABC): Chris Fowler, Todd Blackledge, Holly Rowe

Scoring summary
1	4:31	PSU	Devyn Ford 1 yd run (Jake Pinegar kick)	PSU 0–7
2	6:34	PITT	Alex Kessman 25 yd field goal	PSU 3–7
2	2:08	PITT	Davis, V. 3 yd run (Alex Kessman kick)	PITT 10–7
2	0:01	PSU	Jordan Stout 57 yd field goal	Tied 10–10
3	5:50	PSU	Noah Cain 13 yd run (Jake Pinegar kick)	PSU 10–17

=== UCF ===
UCF at Pittsburgh

Team	1	2	3	4	Total
No. 15 Knights	0	10	21	3	34
• Panthers	7	14	7	7	35

- Date: September 21
- Location:
  Heinz Field
  Pittsburgh, PA
- Game start: 3:36 p.m. EDT
- Elapsed time: 3:49
- Game attendance: 42,056
- Game weather: 88 °F (31 °C) • Wind N 6 mph (9.7 km/h) • Sunny
- Referee: Lamertina, C.
- TV announcers (ABC/ESPN2): Jason Benetti, Rod Gilmore, Quint Kessenich

Scoring summary
1	9:36	PITT	Davis, A. 2 yd run (Alex Kessman kick)	PITT 0–7
2	14:31	PITT	Ffrench, M. 2 yd pass from Kenny Pickett (Kessman kick)	PITT 0–14
2	8:58	PITT	Davis, W. 18 yd punt return (Kessman kick)	PITT 0–21
2	4:49	UCF	Adrian Killins 11 yd run (Dylan Barnas kick)	PITT 7–21
2	0:04	UCF	Dylan Barnas 43 yd field goal	PITT 10–21
3	11:25	UCF	Gabe Davis 10 yd pass from Dillon Gabriel (Barnas kick)	PITT 17–21
3	8:40	UCF	Anderson, O. 87 yd punt return (Barnas kick)	UCF 24–21
3	6:19	UCF	Davis, G. 28 yd pass from Gabriel, D. (Barnas kick)	UCF 31–21
3	4:11	PITT	Butler-Jenkins 6 yd pass from Patti, N. (Kessman kick)	UCF 31–28
4	4:36	UCF	Barnas, D. 28 yd field goal	UCF 34–28
4	0:59	PITT	Pickett, K. 3 yd pass from Mathews, A. (Kessman kick)	PITT 34–35

=== Delaware ===
Delaware at Pittsburgh

Team	1	2	3	4	Total
No. 20 (FCS) Fightin' Blue Hens	0	7	7	0	14
• Panthers	0	10	0	7	17

- Date: September 28
- Location:
  Heinz Field
  Pittsburgh, PA
- Game start: 12:35 a.m. EDT
- Elapsed time: 3:12
- Game attendance: 44,141
- Game weather: 79 °F (26 °C) • Wind S 10 mph (16 km/h) • Partly Sunny
- Referee: Woods, M.
- TV announcers (ACCRSN): Tom Werme, James Bates

Scoring summary
2	14:54	PITT	Carter, V. 30 yd pass from Patti, N. (Alex Kessman kick)	PITT 0–7
2	6:28	DE	Gene Coleman II 7 yd pass from Nolan Henderson (Jake Roth kick)	TIED 7–7
2	0:08	PITT	Alex Kessman 21 yd field goal	PITT 7–10
3	12:53	DE	Townsend, J. 5 yd pass from Henderson, N. (Roth kick)	DE 14–10
4	10:33	PITT	Mack, T. 12 yd pass from Patti, N. (Kessman kick)	PITT 14–17

=== At Duke ===
Pittsburgh at Duke

Team	1	2	3	4	Total
• Panthers	10	9	7	7	33
Blue Devils	3	0	7	20	30

- Date: October 5
- Location:
  Wallace Wade Stadium
  Durham, NC
- Game start: 8:05 p.m. EDT
- Elapsed time: 3:55
- Game attendance: 22,610
- Game weather: 62 °F (17 °C) • Wind NNE 5 mph (8.0 km/h) • Mostly cloudy
- Referee: Tra Blake
- TV announcers (ACCN): Dave O'Brien, Tim Hasselbeck, Katie George

Scoring summary
1	8:43	DUKE	Reed, A. 33 yd field goal	DUKE 0–3
1	4:49	PITT	Ford, P. 26 yd interception(Alex Kessman kick)	PITT 7–3
1	1:35	PITT	Alex Kessman 43 yd field goal	PITT 10–3
2	3:07	PITT	Alex Kessman 38 yd field goal	PITT 13–3
2	1:59	PITT	Mack, T. 19 yd pass from Kenny Pickett(Kessman kick)	PITT 19–3
3	11:05	PITT	Griffin-Stewart 4 yd pass from Pickett(Kessman kick)	PITT 26–3
3	2:41	DUKE	Harris, Q. 4 yd run(Reed kick)	PITT 26–10
4	13:09	DUKE	Jackson, D. 2 yd run(Calhoun, J. rush)	PITT 26–18
4	9:10	DUKE	Harris, Q. 3 yd run(Harris, Q. rush failed)	PITT 26–24
4	1:29	DUKE	Jackson, D. 44 yd pass from Harris, Q.(Harris pass failed)	DUKE 26–30
4	0:38	PITT	Carter, V. 26 yd pass from Pickett(Kessman kick)	PITT 33–30

=== At Syracuse ===
Pittsburgh at Syracuse

Team	1	2	3	4	Total
• Panthers	10	14	0	3	27
Orange	3	3	7	7	20

- Date: October 18
- Location:
  The Dome
  Syracuse, NY
- Game start: 7:01 p.m. EDT
- Elapsed time: 3:38
- Game attendance: 44,886
- Game weather: Dome
- Referee: Stuart Mullins
- TV announcers (ESPN): Dave Flemming, Jim Mora, Paul Carcaterra

Scoring summary
1	5:45	PITT	Alex Kessman 47 yd field goal	PITT 3–0
1	3:07	SU	Szmyt, A. 28 yd field goal	TIED 3–3
1	1:23	PITT	Mathews, A. 43 yd pass from Kenny Pickett(Kessman kick)	PITT 10–3
2	12:03	SU	Szmyt 20 yd field goal	PITT 10–6
2	4:53	PITT	Davis, A. 5 yd run(Kessman kick)	PITT 17–6
2	0:23	PITT	Ffrench, M. 14 yd pass from Pickett(Kessman kick)	PITT 24–6
3	11:12	SU	Harris, T. 94 yd pass from Welch, C.(Szmyt kick)	PITT 24–13
4	7:03	PITT	Kessman 34 yd field goal	PITT 27–13
4	2:44	SU	Hackett, A. 7 yd pass from Welch(Szmyt kick)	PITT 27–20

=== Miami (FL) ===
Miami (FL) at Pittsburgh

Team	1	2	3	4	Total
• Hurricanes	3	7	0	6	16
Panthers	3	3	3	3	12

- Date: October 26
- Location:
  Heinz Field
  Pittsburgh, PA
- Game start: 12:02 a.m. EDT
- Elapsed time: 3:14
- Game attendance: 47,918
- Game weather: 57 °F (14 °C) • Wind E 6 mph (9.7 km/h) • Showers
- Referee: Flanagan, J.
- TV announcers (ESPN): Mark Jones, Dusty Dvoracek, Olivia Dekker

Scoring summary
1	11:15	PITT	Alex Kessman 54 yd field goal	PITT 0–3
1	5:26	MIAMI	Price, C. 22 yd field goal	TIED 3–3
2	12:00	MIAMI	Harris, C. 1 yd run(Price kick)	MIAMI 10–3
2	2:39	PITT	Kessman 25 yd field goal	MIAMI 10–6
3	12:14	PITT	Kessman 29 yd field goal	MIAMI 10–9
4	7:19	PITT	Kessman 29 yd field goal	PITT 10–12
4	0:58	MIAMI	Osborn, K. 32 yd pass from Williams, J.(Harley, M. pass intercepted)	MIAMI 16–12

=== At Georgia Tech ===
Pittsburgh at Georgia Tech

Team	1	2	3	4	Total
• Panthers	10	7	0	3	20
Yellow Jackets	0	7	3	0	10

- Date: November 2
- Location:
  Bobby Dodd Stadium
  Atlanta, GA
- Game start: 4:05 p.m. EDT
- Elapsed time: 3:07
- Game attendance: 41,219
- Game weather: 61 °F (16 °C) • Wind: calm • cool, bright
- Referee: Riley Johnson
- TV announcers (ACCRSN): Tom Werme, James Bates, Kelsey Wingert

Scoring summary
1	11:14	PITT	Alex Kessman 32 yd field goal	PITT 3–0
1	6:25	PITT	Davis, V. 61 yd run(Kessman kick)	PITT 10–0
2	13:24	GT	Brown, Ah. 51 yd pass from Graham, J.(King, B. kick)	PITT 10–7
2	9:34	PITT	Jacques-Louis 21 yd pass from Kenny Pickett(Kessman kick)	PITT 17–7
3	9:46	GT	King 30 yd field goal	PITT 17–10
4	14:54	PITT	Kessman 49 yd field goal	PITT 20–10

=== North Carolina ===
North Carolina at Pittsburgh

Team	1	2	3	4	OT	Total
North Carolina	7	3	0	17	0	27
• Panthers	3	14	7	3	7	34

- Date: November 14
- Location:
  Heinz Field
  Pittsburgh, PA
- Game start: 8:02 p.m. EDT
- Elapsed time: 3:43
- Game attendance: 39,290
- Game weather: 36 °F (2 °C) • Wind SW 6 mph (9.7 km/h) • Clear
- Referee: Duane Heydt
- TV announcers (ESPN): Adam Amin (play-by-play), Matt Hasselbeck (analyst), Pat McAfee (analyst), Molly McGrath (sideline)

Scoring summary
1	8:32	PITT	Alex Kessman 41 yd field goal	PITT 0–3
1	6:14	UNC	Corrales, B. 21 yd pass from Howell, S.(Ruggles, N. kick)	UNC 7–3
2	12:03	PITT	Kenny Pickett 2 yd run(Kessman kick)	PITT 7–10
2	9:41	PITT	Jacques-Louis 74 yd pass from Pickett(Kessman kick)	PITT 7–17
2	7:36	UNC	Ruggles 25 yd field goal	PITT 10–17
3	2:12	PITT	Davis, A. 8 yd run(Kessman kick)	PITT 10–24
4	13:11	UNC	Brown, D. 10 yd pass from Howell(Ruggles kick)	PITT 17–24
4	11:43	UNC	Newsome, D. 34 yd pass from Howell(Ruggles kick)	TIED 24–24
4	5:18	PITT	Kessman 24 yd field goal	PITT 24–27
4	0:13	UNC	Ruggles 32 yd field goal	TIED 27–27
OT	0:00	PITT	Pickett, K. 3 yd run(Kessman kick)	PITT 27–34

=== At Virginia Tech ===
Pittsburgh at Virginia Tech

Team	1	2	3	4	Total
Panthers	0	0	0	0	0
• Hokies	14	7	0	7	28

- Date: November 23
- Location:
  Lane Stadium
  Blacksburg, Virginia
- Game start: 3:35 p.m. EDT
- Elapsed time: 3:03
- Game attendance: 55,936
- Game weather: Temperature: 39 °F (4 °C) • Wind: Light • Weather: Rain
- Referee: Jeff Maconaghy
- TV announcers (ESPN2): Mark Jones, Dusty Dvoracek, Olivia Dekker

Scoring summary
1	3:16	VT	James Mitchell 1 yd run(Johnson kick)	VT 0–7
1	3:07	VT	Norell Pollard 7 yard fumble recovery(Johnson kick)	VT 0–14
2	0:45	VT	Tre Turner 3 yd pass from Hendon Hooker(Johnson kick)	VT 0–21
4	10:12	VT	Hazelton 2 yd pass from Hendon Hooker(Johnson kick)	VT 0–28

=== Boston College ===
Boston College at Pittsburgh

Team	1	2	3	4	Total
• Eagles	6	7	10	3	26
Panthers	0	9	7	3	19

- Date: November 30
- Location:
  Heinz Field
  Pittsburgh, PA
- Game start: 3:35 p.m. EDT
- Elapsed time: 3:03
- Game attendance: 40,889
- Game weather: 41 °F (5 °C) • 5 mph (8.0 km/h) E • cold, cloudy
- Referee: Riley Johnson
- TV announcers (ACCN): Chris Cotter, Mark Herzlich, Kelsey Riggs

Scoring summary
1	5:33	BC	A. Boumerhi 39 yd field goal	BC 3–0
1	3:00	BC	Boumerhi 32 yd field goal	BC 6–0
2	14:11	PITT	A. Kessman 23 yd field goal	BC 6–3
2	9:49	BC	H. Long 25 yd pass from D. Grosel(Boumerhi kick)	BC 13–3
2	6:03	PITT	Kessman 35 yd field goal	BC 13–6
2	0:00	PITT	Kessman 48 yd field goal	BC 13–9
3	12:22	PITT	V. Davis 39 yd run(Kessman kick)	PITT 13–16
3	11:31	BC	A. Dillon 61 yd run(Boumerhi kick)	BC 20–16
3	0:57	BC	Boumerhi 30 yd field goal	BC 23–16
4	9:41	BC	Boumerhi 22 yd field goal	BC 26–16
4	5:26	PITT	Kessman 43 yd field goal	BC 26–19

=== vs Eastern Michigan (Quick Lane Bowl) ===
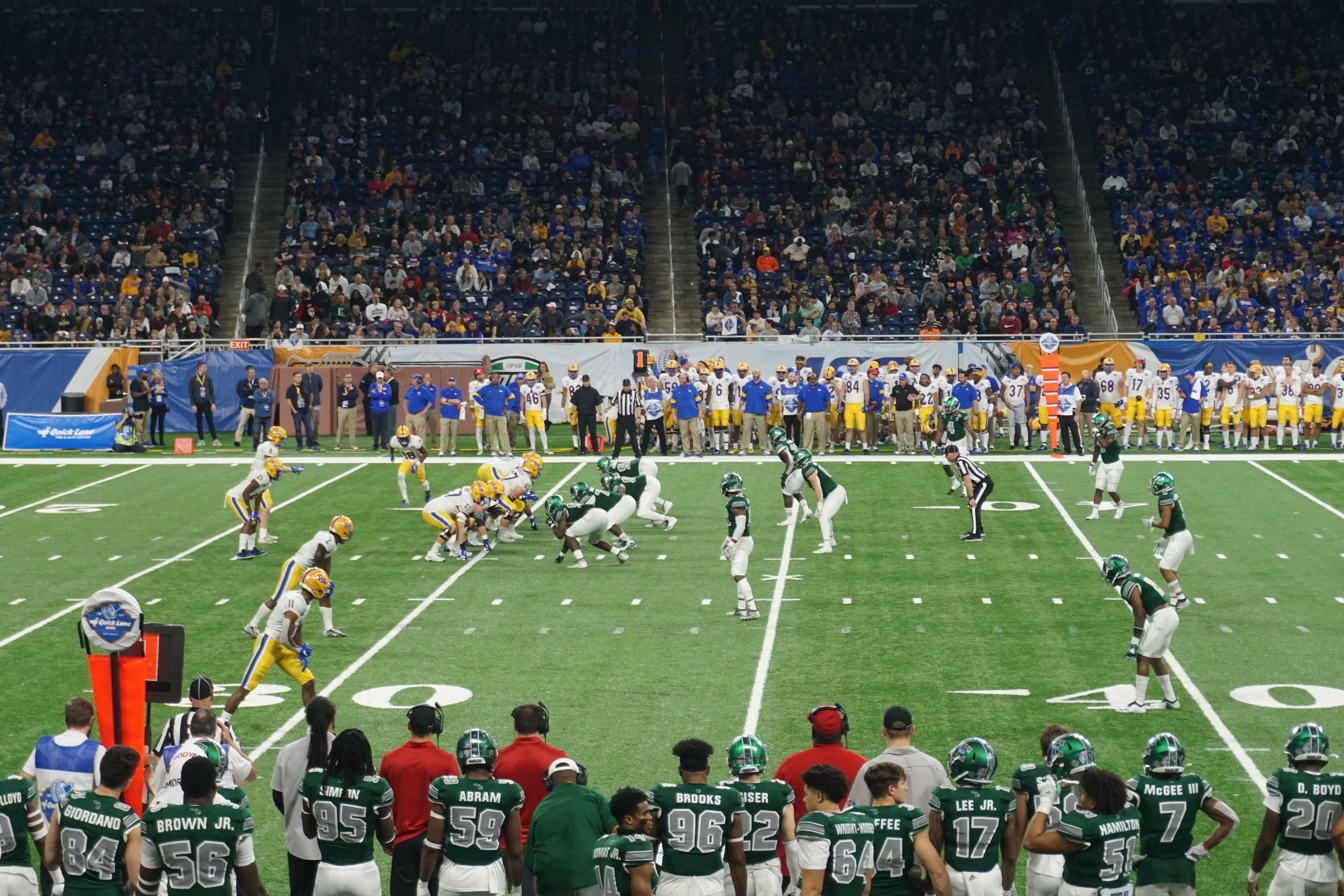
Pittsburgh in action against Eastern Michigan during the 2019 Quick Lane Bowl

Pittsburgh vs Eastern Michigan
(Quick Lane Bowl)

Team	1	2	3	4	Total
• Panthers	0	17	3	14	34
Eagles	10	10	0	10	30

- Date: December 26
- Location:
  Ford Field
  Detroit, MI
- Game start: 8:00 p.m. EDT
- Game attendance: 34,765
- TV announcers (ESPN): Mike Corey, Rene Ingoglia, Allison Williams (sideline)

Scoring summary

== Coaching staff ==
2019 Pittsburgh Panthers football staff
Coaching staff: Pat Narduzzi – head coach; Charlie Partridge – assistant head coach/defensive line; Mark Whipple – offensive coordinator/quarterbacks; Randy Bates – defensive coordinator; Andre Powell – running backs/special teams; Rob Harley – linebackers/recruiting coordinator; Dave Borbely – offensive line; Archie Collins – secondary; Tim Salem – tight ends; Cory Sanders – safeties; Chris Beatty – wide receivers	Support staff: Chris LaSala – associate athletic director/football operations; Bob Junko – director of player development and high school relations; Ben Mathers – director of football operations; Reed Case – director of recruiting; Ben Cotton – offensive graduate assistant; Mike Caprara – defensive graduate assistant; Mike Perish – offensive graduate assistant; Josh Lott – defensive graduate assistant	Strength and conditioning staff: Dave Andrews – head strength and conditioning coach; Freddie Walker – associate strength and conditioning coach; Austin Addington-Strapp – assistant strength and conditioning coach

== Roster ==
2019 Pittsburgh Panthers football roster
Quarterbacks: 3 Jeff George Jr. – (redshirt) senior (6'3, 215); 8 Kenny Pickett – junior (6'2, 220); 12 Nick Patti – (redshirt) freshman (6'1, 210); 15 Justin Sliwoski – (redshirt) freshman (6'1, 195); 17 Davis Beville – freshman (6'5, 210); 18 Eli Kosanovich – freshman (6'2, 195); Tailbacks: 4 Daniel Carter – freshman (5'10, 220); 21 A.J. Davis – junior (6'0, 215); 22 Vincent Davis – freshman (5'8, 170); 23 Todd Sibley Jr. – (redshirt) sophomore (5'9, 220); 39 Kyle Vreen – (redshirt) junior (5'10, 180); Fullbacks: 40 Grey Brancifort – (redshirt) freshman (6'1, 240) LS; 41 Jake Zilinskas – (redshirt) junior (6'2, 230); 43 Elias Myers – freshman (6'3, 215); 48 Peyton Deri – (redshirt) junior (6'1, 220); Wide receivers: 2 Maurice Ffrench – senior (5'11, 200); 5 Tre Tipton – (redshirt) senior (6'0, 190); 6 Aaron Mathews – senior (6'4, 220); 9 Michael Smith – (redshirt) sophomore (6'1, 215); 11 Taysir Mack – (redshirt) junior (6'2, 200); 14 Will Gipson – freshman (6'2, 175); 18 Shocky Jacques−Louis – sophomore (6'0, 180); 19 V'Lique Carter – sophomore (5’9, 170); 27 Gavin Thompson – freshman (6'0, 175); 29 Joshua Junko – freshman (6'0, 190); 34 Jacob Hunsinger – freshman (6'2, 185); 35 Isaiah Stewart – freshman (6'2, 185); 46 Michael Vardzel – (redshirt) junior (5'11, 190); 80 Cameron O'Neil – (redshirt) freshman (6'1, 200); 82 Jared Wayne – freshman (6'3, 190); 83 John Vardzel – (redshirt) freshman (5'10, 185); 85 Garrett Bickhart – (redshirt) sophomore (6'5, 220); 88 Dontavius Butler−Jenkins – (redshirt) sophomore (6'0, 210); Tight ends: 10 Will Gragg – (redshirt) senior (6'4, 250); 16 Jake Cortes – (redshirt) freshman (6'5, 235); 19 Jake Zilinskas – (redshirt) sophomore (6'2, 230); 28 Kyi Wright – freshman (6'2, 240); 44 Jason Collier – freshman (6'5, 285); 81 Jim Medure – (redshirt) senior (6'2, 235); 84 Grant Carrigan – (redshirt) sophomore (6'7, 280); 86 Nakia Griffin-Stewart – (redshirt) senior (6'5, 260)	Offensive linemen: 52 Kenny Rainey III – (redshirt) sophomore (6'3, 325); 53 Jake Kradel – (redshirt) freshman (6'3, 300); 54 Rashad Wheeler – (redshirt) junior (6’3, 285); 55 Chase Brown – (redshirt) senior (6’5, 305); 56 Brandon Ford – (redshirt) junior (6’5, 310); 57 Gabe Houy – (redshirt) sophomore (6'6, 305); 59 Carson Van Lynn – (redshirt) sophomore (6’5, 290); 60 Owen Drexel – (redshirt) sophomore (6'3, 295); 61 Brian Burgess – (redshirt) sophomore (6'2, 295); 66 Shane Murphy – freshman (6'4, 270); 67 Jimmy Morrissey – (redshirt) junior (6’3, 305); 68 Blake Zubovic – (redshirt) freshman (6’4, 315); 70 Nolan Ulizio – (redshirt) senior (6'5, 320); 71 Bryce Hargrove – (redshirt) junior (6’4, 305); 72 Liam Dick – freshman (6'7, 300); 74 Jerry Drake Jr. – (redshirt) sophomore (6’5, 315); 76 Matt Goncalves – freshman (6'6, 305); 77 Carter Warren – (redshirt) sophomore (6'5, 315); Defensive linemen: 2 David Green – (redshirt) freshman (6'0, 285); 5 Deslin Alexandre – (redshirt) sophomore (6'4, 270); 6 John Morgan – (redshirt) freshman (6'2, 250); 8 Calijah Kancey – freshman (6'0, 270); 10 Keyshon Camp – (redshirt) junior (6’4, 285); 16 Nate Temple – freshman (6'4, 225); 17 Rashad Weaver – (redshirt) junior (6’5, 265); 25 Kaymar Mimes – (redshirt) freshman (6'5, 245); 34 Amir Watts – senior (6’3, 300); 45 Noah Palmer – (redshirt) freshman (6'3, 255); 57 Bam Brima – freshman (6'5, 235); 58 Bryce Nelms – freshman (6'5, 260); 87 Habakkuk Baldonado – (redshirt) freshman (6’5, 235); 90 DeAndre Jules – freshman (6'2, 260); 91 Patrick Jones II – (redshirt) junior (6’5, 260); 92 Tyler Bentley – (redshirt) freshman (6’2, 305); 95 Devin Danielson – (redshirt) freshman (6'1, 300); 96 Chris Maloney – (redshirt) freshman (6’2, 245); 97 Jaylen Twyman – (redshirt) sophomore (6'2, 290); Punters: 49 Ethan Van Buskirk – (redshirt) freshman (5'10, 215); 96 Jared Campbell – freshman (6'1, 190); 98 Kirk Christodoulou – (redshirt) sophomore (6'1, 210)	Linebackers: 9 Saleem Brightwell – (redshirt) senior (6’0, 225); 20 Wendell Davis – (redshirt) freshman (6’2, 245); 23 Leslie Smith – freshman (5'11, 195); 24 Phil Campbell III – (redshirt) junior (6’1, 215); 28 Kylan Johnson – (redshirt) senior (6'2, 230); 29 Albert Tucker – (redshirt) sophomore (6'1, 220); 30 Brandon George – freshman (6'2, 235); 32 SirVocea Dennis – freshman (6'1, 220); 36 Chase Pine – (redshirt) junior (6’2, 255); 38 Cam Bright – (redshirt) sophomore (6'0, 220); 44 Elias Reynolds – (redshirt) junior (6’2, 240); 47 Kyle Nunn – (redshirt) sophomore (6'3, 225); 48 Jackson Henry – (redshirt) freshman (6’2, 235); 52 Jack Hansberry – (redshirt) freshman (6’1, 220) LS; Defensive backs: 3 Damar Hamlin – senior (6’1, 195); 4 Therran Coleman – (redshirt) junior (6’0, 205); 7 Jazzee Stocker – (redshirt) senior (6’2, 190); 8 John Petrishen – (redshirt) senior (6’1, 210); 11 Dane Jackson – (redshirt) senior (6’0, 190); 12 Paris Ford – (redshirt) sophomore (6'0, 195); 14 Marquis Williams – (redshirt) freshman (5’8, 170); 15 Jason Pinnock – junior (6'0, 200); 20 Paris Brown – freshman (5'10, 190); 21 Damarri Mathis – junior (5'11, 190); 22 Brandon Hill – freshman (5'10, 205); 25 A.J. Woods – freshman (5'10, 175); 26 Judson Tallandier – (redshirt) freshman (6'0, 185); 27 Bricen Garner – (redshirt) junior (6’1, 190); 31 Erick Hallett – (redshirt) freshman (5'11, 185); 37 Brassir Stocker – freshman (6'0, 185); Placekickers: 91 Sam Scarton – freshman (6'0, 170); 97 Alex Kessman – (redshirt) junior (6'3, 190); 98 Will Connelly – (redshirt) freshman (6'2, 215); Long snappers: 93 Brandon Hurst – freshman (6'3, 195); 94 Cal Adomitis – junior (6'1, 230)

== Team players drafted into the NFL ==
Player	Position	Round	Pick	NFL club
Dane Jackson	Cornerback	7	239	Buffalo Bills
