= 2019 Quick Lane Bowl =

Postseason college football bowl game

- 6th Quick Lane Bowl
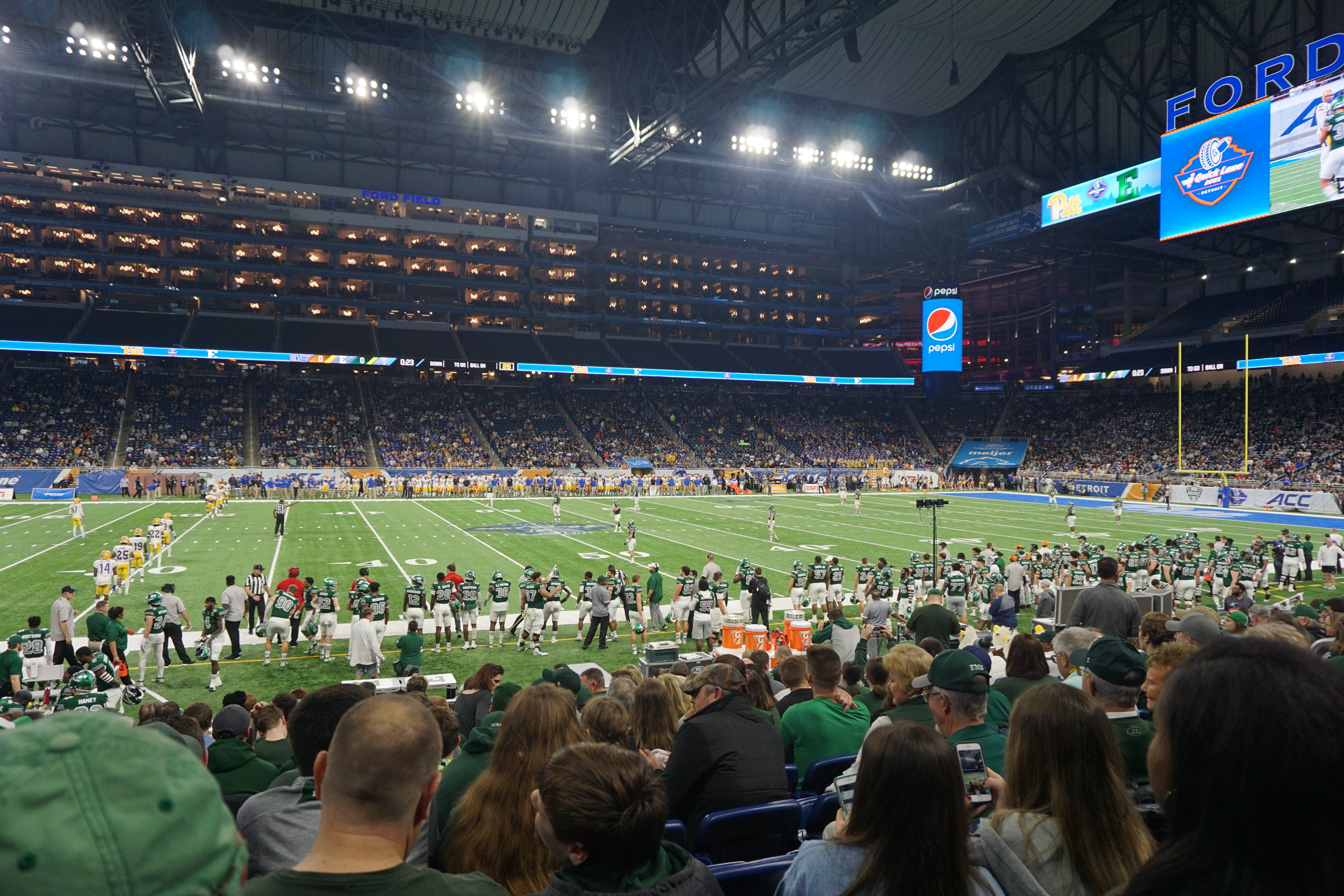
- Opening kickoff of the 2019 Quick Lane Bowl
Pittsburgh Panthers	Eastern Michigan Eagles
(7–5)	(6–6)
ACC	MAC
34	30
Head coach: Pat Narduzzi	Head coach: Chris Creighton
	1	2	3	4	Total
Pittsburgh	0	17	3	14	34
Eastern Michigan	10	10	0	10	30
- Date: December 26, 2019
- Season: 2019
- Stadium: Ford Field
- Location: Detroit, Michigan
- MVP: Kenny Pickett (QB, Pittsburgh)
- Favorite: Pitt by 12.5
- Referee: Steve Marlowe (SEC)
- Attendance: 34,765
- Payout: US$2,000,000

United States TV coverage
- Network: ESPN
- Announcers: Mike Corey (play-by-play), Rene Ingoglia (analyst) and Allison Williams (sideline)

International TV coverage
- Network: ESPN Brasil
- Announcers: Ari Aguiar (play-by-play); Eduardo Zolin (analyst)

The 2019 Quick Lane Bowl was a college football bowl game that was played on December 26, 2019, with kickoff at 8:00 p.m. EST on ESPN. It was the 6th edition of the Quick Lane Bowl, and was one of the 2019–20 bowl games concluding the 2019 FBS football season.

== Teams ==
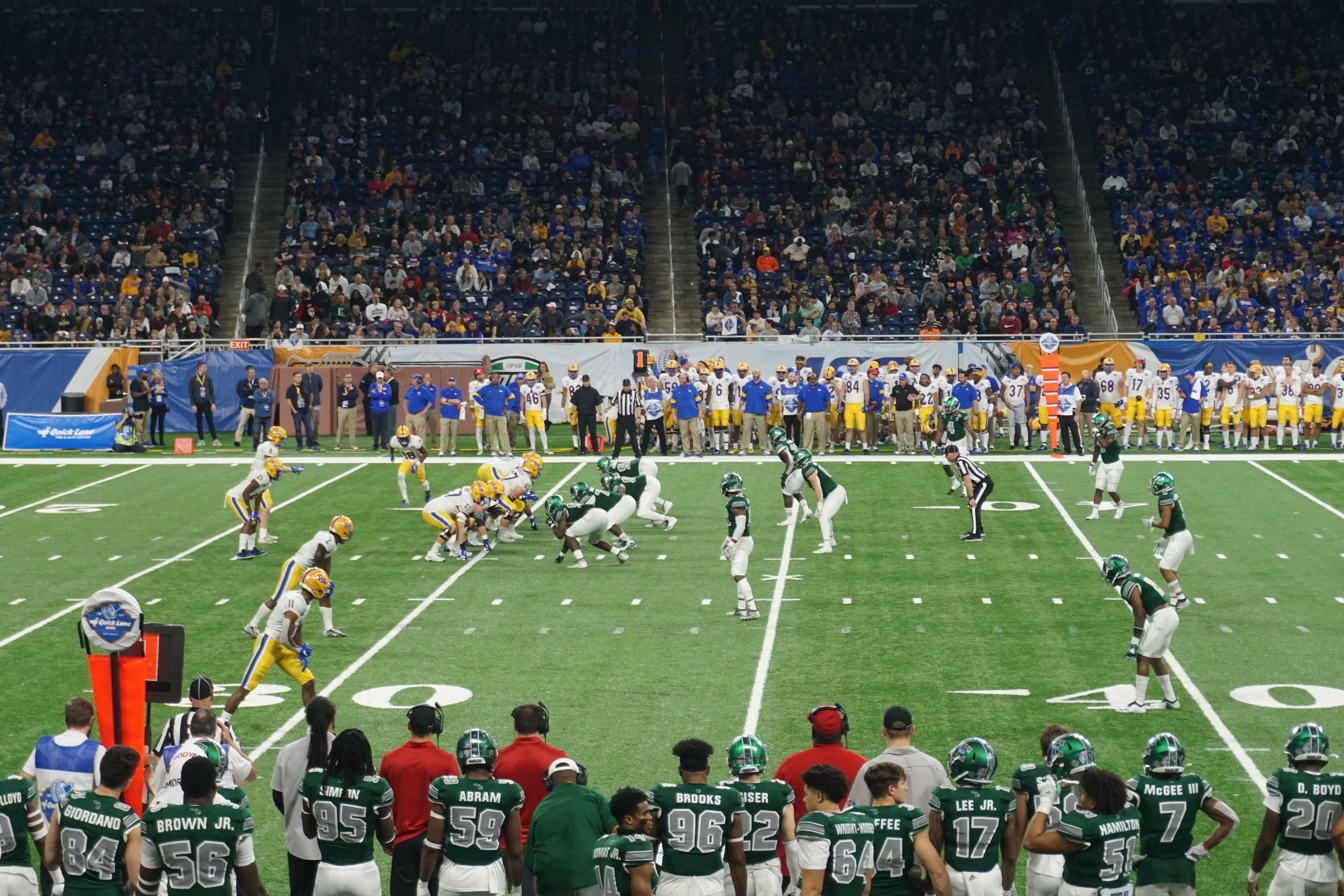
Pittsburgh on offense during the 2019 Quick Lane Bowl

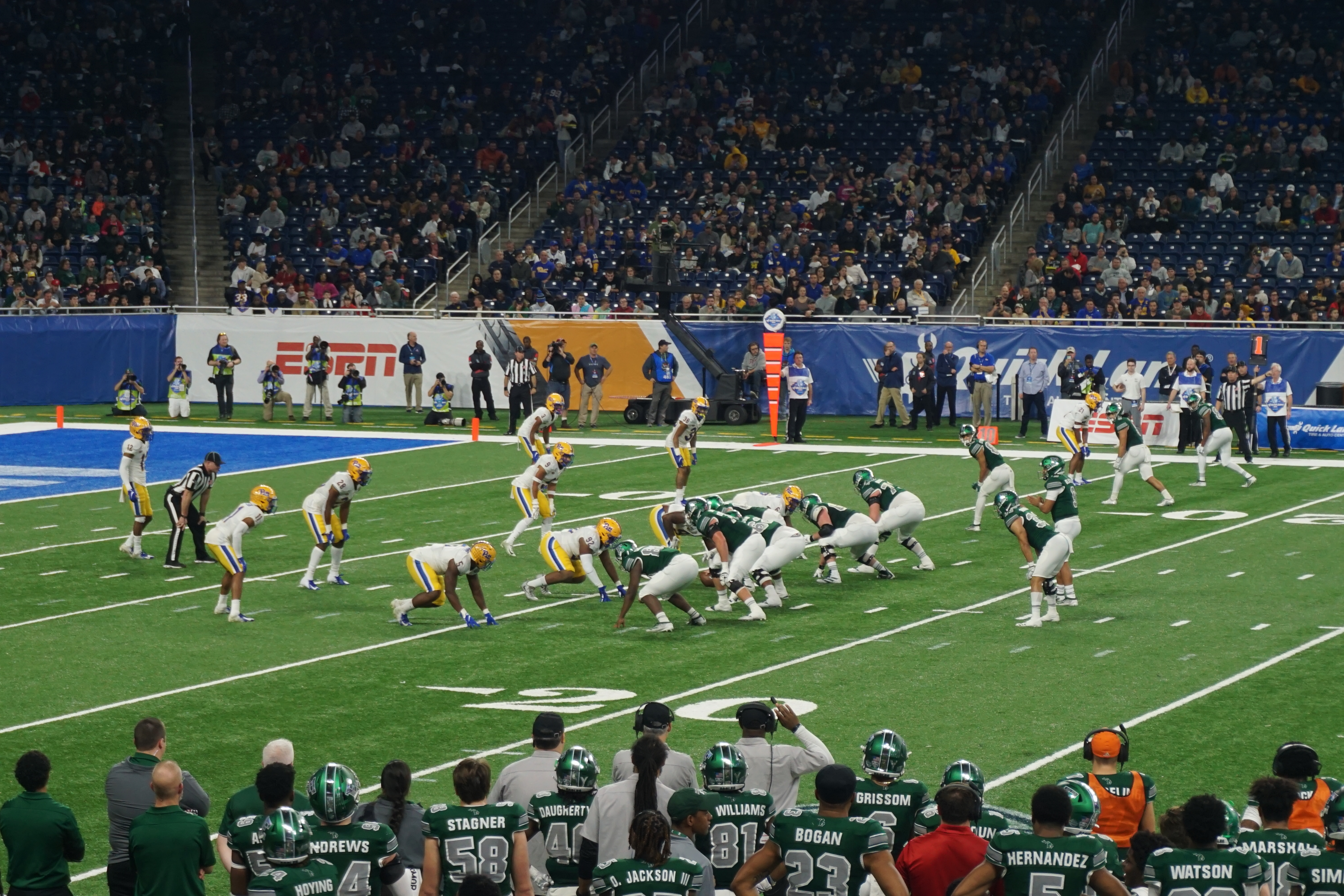
Eastern Michigan on offense during the game

The game featured the Pittsburgh Panthers from the Atlantic Coast Conference (ACC) playing against the Eastern Michigan Eagles from the Mid-American Conference (MAC). It was the third meeting between Eastern Michigan and Pittsburgh; the Panthers had won both of their prior meetings.

=== Pittsburgh Panthers ===
Pittsburgh entered the bowl with a 7–5 record (4–4 in conference). The Panthers finished in three-way tie for third place in the Coastal Division of the ACC.

=== Eastern Michigan Eagles ===
Eastern Michigan entered the game at 6–6 (3–5 in conference). The Eagles finished tied with Toledo for fifth place in the West Division of the MAC.

== Game summary ==
2019 Quick Lane Bowl

Quarter	1	2	3	4	Total
Pittsburgh	0	17	3	14	34
Eastern Michigan	10	10	0	10	30

at Ford Field • Detroit, Michigan

- Date: Thursday, December 26, 2019
- Game time: 8:00 p.m. EST
- Game weather: n/a (game played indoors)
- Game attendance: 34,765
- Referee: Steve Marlowe
- TV announcers (ESPN): Mike Corey (play-by-play), Rene Ingoglia (analyst) and Allison Williams (sideline)
- ESPN game summary

Game information

First Quarter

- (10:04) EMU – Chad Ryland 35 yard field goal (Drive: 14 plays, 57 yards, 4:56; Eastern Michigan 3–0)
- (6:46) EMU – Mike Glass III 3 yard rush, Chad Ryland kick (Drive: 5 plays, 59 yards, 2:00; Eastern Michigan 10–0)

Second Quarter

- (13:46) PITT – Alex Kessman 44 yard field goal (Drive: 9 plays, 43 yards, 3:25; Eastern Michigan 10–3)
- (11:57) PITT – Kenny Pickett 96 yard pass to Maurice Ffrench, Alex Kessman kick (Drive: 1 play, 96 yards, 0:16; Tied 10–10)
- (10:04) EMU – Mike Glass III 50 yard pass to Quian Williams, Chad Ryland kick (Drive: 4 plays, 75 yards, 1:53; Eastern Michigan 17–10)
- (6:20) PITT – Vincent Davis 8 yard rush, Alex Kessman kick (Drive: 8 plays, 75 yards, 3:44; Tied 17–17)
- (1:32) EMU – Chad Ryland 45 yard field goal (Drive: 9 plays, 48 yards, 4:48; Eastern Michigan 20–17)

Third Quarter

- (4:16) PITT – Alex Kessman 51 yard field goal (Drive: 4 plays, –4 yards, 2:11; Tied 20–20)

Fourth Quarter

- (10:45) EMU – Mike Glass III 10 yard pass to Arthur Jackson, Chad Ryland kick (Drive: 11 plays, 63 yards, 5:39; Eastern Michigan 27–20)
- (8:22) PITT – Kenny Pickett 19 yard pass to Jared Wayne, Alex Kessman kick (Drive: 6 plays, 75 yards, 2:16; Tied 27–27)
- (6:00) EMU – Chad Ryland 48 yard field goal (Drive: 9 plays, 44 yards, 2:22; Eastern Michigan 30–27)
- (0:47) PITT – Kenny Pickett 25 yard pass to Taysir Mack, Alex Kessman kick (Drive: 10 plays, 91 yards, 1:56; Pittsburgh 34–30)

=== Statistics ===
Statistics	PITT	EMU
First downs	22	27
Plays–yards	68–457	87–438
Rushes–yards	29–96	36–127
Passing yards	361	311
Passing: comp–att–int	27–39–0	28–51–1
Time of possession	25:51	34:09

Team	Category	Player	Statistics
Pittsburgh	Passing	Kenny Pickett	27/39, 361 yards, 3 TD
Pittsburgh	Rushing	Vincent Davis	15 carries, 69 yards, 1 TD
Pittsburgh	Receiving	Maurice Ffrench	12 receptions, 165 yards, 1 TD
Eastern Michigan	Passing	Mike Glass III	28/50, 311 yards, 2 TD, 1 INT
Eastern Michigan	Rushing	Mike Glass III	21 carries, 83 yards, 1 TD
Eastern Michigan	Receiving	Hassan Beydoun	9 receptions, 113 yards
