= 2021 Pittsburgh Panthers football team =

American college football season

2021 Pittsburgh Panthers football

Lambert-Meadowlands Trophy ACC champion ACC Coastal Division champion

ACC Championship Game, W 45–21 vs. Wake Forest

Peach Bowl, L 21–31 vs. Michigan State
- Conference: Atlantic Coast Conference
- Coastal Division

Ranking
- Coaches: No. 13
- AP: No. 13
- Record: 11–3 (7–1 ACC)
- Head coach: Pat Narduzzi (7th season)
- Offensive coordinator: Mark Whipple (3rd season)
- Offensive scheme: Pro-style
- Defensive coordinator: Randy Bates (4th season)
- Base defense: 4–3
- Home stadium: Heinz Field

2021 Atlantic Coast Conference football standings
	Conf.			Overall
Team	W		L	W		L
Atlantic Division
No. 15 Wake Forest xy	7	–	1	11	–	3
No. 20 NC State	6	–	2	9	–	3
No. 14 Clemson	6	–	2	10	–	3
Louisville	4	–	4	6	–	7
Florida State	4	–	4	5	–	7
Boston College	2	–	6	6	–	6
Syracuse	2	–	6	5	–	7
Coastal Division
No. 13 Pittsburgh xy$	7	–	1	11	–	3
Miami (FL)	5	–	3	7	–	5
Virginia Tech	4	–	4	6	–	7
Virginia	4	–	4	6	–	6
North Carolina	3	–	5	6	–	7
Georgia Tech	2	–	6	3	–	9
Duke	0	–	8	3	–	9
Championship: Pittsburgh 45, Wake Forest 21
$ – Conference champion; x – Division champion/co-champions; y – Championship game participant; Rankings from AP Poll

The 2021 Pittsburgh Panthers football team represented the University of Pittsburgh in the 2021 NCAA Division I FBS football season. The Panthers were led by seventh-year head coach Pat Narduzzi and played their home games at Heinz Field. They competed in the Atlantic Coast Conference (ACC), marking Pitt's ninth season as a member of the ACC. The Panthers won the ACC Championship with a record of 11–2 and a 45–21 victory over Wake Forest in the 2021 ACC Championship Game, becoming the first school other than Clemson or Florida State to win the conference championship since Virginia Tech in 2010. It was Pitt's first Lambert Trophy win since 1980.

== Schedule ==
Date	Time	Opponent	Rank	Site	TV	Result	Attendance
September 4	4:00 p.m.	UMass*		Heinz Field; Pittsburgh, PA	ACCN	W 51–7	41,486
September 11	12:00 p.m.	at Tennessee*		Neyland Stadium; Knoxville, TN	ESPN	W 41–34	82,203
September 18	12:00 p.m.	Western Michigan*		Heinz Field; Pittsburgh, PA	ACCRSN	L 41–44	40,581
September 25	12:00 p.m.	No. 21 (FCS) New Hampshire*		Heinz Field; Pittsburgh, PA	ACCNX/ESPN+	W 77–7	41,048
October 2	12:00 p.m.	at Georgia Tech		Bobby Dodd Stadium; Atlanta, GA	ACCN	W 52–21	36,383
October 16	3:30 p.m.	at Virginia Tech		Lane Stadium; Blacksburg, VA	ESPN2	W 28–7	58,314
October 23	3:30 p.m.	Clemson	No. 23	Heinz Field; Pittsburgh, PA	ESPN	W 27–17	60,594
October 30	12:00 p.m.	Miami (FL)	No. 17	Heinz Field; Pittsburgh, PA	ACCN	L 34–38	46,977
November 6	12:00 p.m.	at Duke	No. 25	Wallace Wade Stadium; Durham, NC	ACCN	W 54–29	20,693
November 11	7:30 p.m.	North Carolina	No. 21	Heinz Field; Pittsburgh, PA	ESPN	W 30–23 ^{OT}	41,687
November 20	3:30 p.m.	Virginia	No. 18	Heinz Field; Pittsburgh, PA	ESPN2	W 48–38	45,183
November 27	7:30 p.m.	at Syracuse	No. 17	Carrier Dome; Syracuse, NY (rivalry)	ACCN	W 31–14	27,939
December 4	8:00 p.m.	vs. No. 16 Wake Forest	No. 15	Bank of America Stadium; Charlotte, NC (ACC Championship Game)	ABC	W 45–21	57,856
December 30	7:00 p.m.	vs. No. 10 Michigan State*	No. 12	Mercedes-Benz Stadium; Atlanta, GA (Peach Bowl)	ESPN	L 21–31	41,230
*Non-conference game; Rankings from AP Poll and CFP Rankings, after November 2 – Released prior to game; All times are in Eastern time

== Roster ==
2021 Pittsburgh Panthers football team roster
Players
Coaches
Offense

Pos.	#	Name	Class
RB	2	Israel Abanikanda	So
WR	3	Jordan Addison	So
WR	4	Malquise Stovall	Sr
WR	5	Jared Wayne	Jr
WR	6	Tre Tipton	Sr
TE	7	Lucas Krull	Sr
QB	8	Kenny Pickett	Sr
RB	9	Rodney Jr. Hammond	Fr
WR	10	Jaylon Barden	So
WR	11	Taysir Mack	Sr
QB	12	Nick Patti	Jr
QB	16	Joey Yellen	So
QB	17	Davis Beville	So
QB	18	Eli Kosanovich	So
QB	19	Nate Yarnell	Fr
WR	20	Myles Alston	Fr
RB	22	Vincent Davis	Jr
TE	25	Kaymar Mimes	Jr
QB	26	Jake Frantl	Fr
WR	27	Luke Delgaudio	Fr
TE	28	Kyi Wright	So
WR	29	Josh Junko	So
WR	35	Isaiah Stewart	So
RB	37	Angelo Priore	Fr
RB	40	Daniel Carter	So
TE	41	Jake Zilinskas	Sr
TE	43	Cole Mitchell	Fr
WR	46	Peter Vardzel	Fr
OL	50	Jason Jr. Collier	So
OL	53	Jake Kradel	Jr
OL	54	Trey Andersen	Fr
OL	55	Marcus Minor	Sr
OL	57	Gabe Houy	Sr
OL	58	Terrence Moore	Fr
OL	60	Owen Drexel	Sr
OL	61	Ryan Jacoby	So
OL	62	Dakota Peters	Jr
OL	63	Matt Altsman	Fr
OL	66	George II French	Fr
OL	68	Blake Zubovic	Jr
OL	69	Matt Metrosky	Fr
OL	72	Jake Cortes	Jr
OL	74	Terrence Jr. Enos	Fr
OL	74	Kelvin Wilson	Sr
OL	76	Matt Goncalves	So
OL	77	Carter Warren	Sr
OL	78	Branson Taylor	Fr
WR	81	Jaden Bradley	Fr
WR	82	Gavin Thomson	So
TE	84	Grant Carrigan	Sr
WR	84	Jake McConnachie	Fr
WR	85	Garrett Bickhart	Sr
TE	86	Gavin Bartholomew	Fr
TE	88	Jake Renda	Fr

Defense

Pos.	#	Name	Class
LB	0	John Petrishen	Sr
DL	2	David Green	Jr
DB	3	Khalil Anderson	Fr
DL	4	Nahki Johnson	Fr
DL	5	Deslin Alexandre	Sr
DL	6	John III Morgan	Jr
LB	7	SirVocea Dennis	Jr
DL	8	Calijah Kancey	So
DB	9	Brandon Hill	So
DL	10	Keyshon Camp	Sr
LB	11	Bengally Kamara	So
DB	12	M.J. Devonshire	So
DB	14	Marquis Williams	Jr
DB	15	Rashad Battle	So
DL	16	Nate Temple	So
DB	19	Jahvontae Royal	Fr
DB	20	Javon McIntyre	Fr
DB	21	Damarri Mathis	Sr
DB	22	P. J. O'Brien	Fr
LB	24	Phil III Campbell	Sr
DB	24	Tamarion Crumpley	Fr
DB	25	A. J. Woods	Jr
DB	26	Judson II Tallandier	Jr
DB	27	Buddy III Mack	So
DB	28	Noah Biglow	Fr
LB	30	Brandon George	Jr
DB	31	Erick Hallett	Jr
LB	34	Solomon DeShields	So
DB	35	Hudson Primus	So
LB	36	Chase Pine	Sr
DB	37	Stephon Hall	Fr
DB	39	Myles Canton	Sr
DL	40	JoJo Belgrave	Fr
DB	41	Jehvonn Lewis	Fr
DB	43	Anthony Scott-Naji	Sr
DB	44	Taelen Brooks	Fr
DB	45	Dante Caputo	So
DL	45	Noah Palmer	Jr
DL	46	Sam Williams	Fr
LB	47	Aydin Henningham	So
LB	48	Jackson Henry	Jr
DB	49	Ak'Bar II Shabazz	Fr
DL	50	Dayon Hayes	So
LB	51	Preston Lavant	Fr
LB	53	Dorien Ford	Fr
LB	54	Dylan Bennett	Fr
DL	56	Will IV King	Fr
DL	57	Bam Brima	So
LB	59	Nick Lapi	Fr
DL	87	Habakkuk Baldonado	Jr
DL	90	DeAndre Jules	So
DL	92	Tyler Bentley	Jr
DL	94	Elliot Donald	Fr
DL	95	Devin Danielson	Jr
DL	96	Chris Maloney	Jr

Special teams

Pos.	#	Name	Class
LS	49	Byron Floyd	Fr
K	90	Ben Sauls	Fr
K	91	Sam Scarton	So
P	92	Cam Guess	Fr
LS	93	James Fineran	Fr
LS	94	Cal Adomitis	Sr
K/P	95	Caleb Junko	Fr
P	98	Kirk Christodoulou	Sr

Head coach

- Pat Narduzzi

Coordinators/assistant coaches

- Charlie Partridge – Assistant Head Coach / Defensive Line
- Mark Whipple – Offensive Coordinator / Quarterbacks
- Randy Bates – Defensive Coordinator
- Andre Powell – Special Teams Coordinator / Running Backs
- Dave Borbely – Offensive Line
- Archie Collins – Defensive Backs
- Ryan Manalac – Linebackers
- Brennan Marion – Wide Receivers
- Tim Salem – Tight Ends
- Cory Sanders – Safeties

Legend

- (C) Team captain
- (S) Suspended
- (I) Ineligible
- Injured
- Redshirt

Roster
Last update: October 25, 2024

== Rankings ==
Ranking movements Legend: ██ Increase in ranking ██ Decrease in ranking — = Not ranked RV = Received votes
	Week															
Poll	Pre	1	2	3	4	5	6	7	8	9	10	11	12	13	14	Final
AP	—	—	RV	—	—	RV	RV	23	17	RV	25	20	20	17	13	13
Coaches	RV	RV	RV	—	—	RV	RV	23	19	25	22	19	17	15	12	13
CFP	Not released									25	21	18	17	15	12	Not released

== Game summaries ==
=== UMass ===
UMass Minutemen at Pittsburgh Panthers

Quarter	1	2	3	4	Total
UMass Minutemen	0	0	0	7	7
Pittsburgh Panthers	13	10	14	14	51

at Heinz Field, Pittsburgh, PA

- Date: September 4, 2021
- Game time: 4:00 p.m. EST
- Game weather: Sunny, 79 °F (26 °C)
- Game attendance: 41,486
- Referee: Jerr Magallanes
- TV: ACCN

Statistics	UMass	PITT
First downs	11	35
Plays–yards	58–209	86–598
Rushes–yards	27–42	41–223
Passing yards	167	375
Passing: comp–att–int	14–31–0	34–45–0
Turnovers		
Time of possession	29:12	30:48

Team	Category	Player	Statistics
UMass	Passing	Tyler Lytle	14/31, 167 YDS
UMass	Rushing	Kay'Ron Adams	11 CAR, 32 YDS
UMass	Receiving	Jermaine Johnson Jr.	3 REC, 52 YDS
PITT	Passing	Kenny Pickett	27/37, 272 YDS, 2 TD
PITT	Rushing	Rodney Hammond Jr	8 CAR, 45 YDS
PITT	Receiving	Lucas Krull	5 REC, 58 YDS, 1 TD

Scoring summary

Quarter	Time	Drive			Team	Scoring information	Score	
Quarter	Time	Plays	Yards	TOP	Team	Scoring information	UMass	PITT
1	4:56	8	60	3:07	PITT	Lucas Krull 5-yard touchdown reception from Kenny Pickett, Sam Scarton kick good	0	7
1	1:31	6	74	1:54	PITT	Jordan Addison 12-yard touchdown reception from Kenny Pickett, Sam Scarton kick no good	0	13
2	5:37	9	44	2:55	PITT	35-yard field goal by Sam Scarton	0	16
2	0:36	9	92	2:39	PITT	A.J. Davis 18-yard touchdown run, Sam Scarton kick good	0	23
3	10:45	7	38	2:34	PITT	Vincent Davis 6-yard touchdown run, Sam Scarton kick good	0	30
3	6:42	11	61	3:32	PITT	Israel Abanikanda 12-yard touchdown run, Sam Scarton kick good	0	37
4	13:50	8	74	3:21	UMass	Tyler Lytle 1-yard touchdown run, Cameron Carson kick good	7	37
4	11:48	5	53	1:52	PITT	Nick Patti 9-yard touchdown run, Ben Sauls kick good	7	44
4	2:44	7	80	2:11	PITT	Daniel Carter 6-yard touchdown run, Ben Sauls kick good	7	51
"TOP" = time of possession. For other American football terms, see Glossary of American football.							7	51

=== At Tennessee ===
Pittsburgh Panthers at Tennessee Volunteers

Quarter	1	2	3	4	Total
Pittsburgh Panthers	0	27	7	7	41
Tennessee Volunteers	10	10	7	7	34

at Neyland Stadium, Knoxville, TN

- Date: September 11, 2021
- Game time: 12:00 EST
- Game weather: Sunny, 71 °F (22 °C)
- Game attendance: 82,203
- Referee: Stuart Mullins
- TV announcers (ESPN): Dave Pasch (play-by-play), Dusty Dvoracek (color) and Tom Luginbill (sidelines)

Statistics	PITT	TENN
First downs	24	20
Plays–yards	82–397	66–374
Rushes–yards	96	136
Passing yards	301	238
Passing: comp–att–int	25–37–0	22–33–1
Turnovers		
Time of possession	36:05	23:55

Team	Category	Player	Statistics
PITT	Passing	Kenny Pickett	24/36, 285 YDS, 2 TD
PITT	Rushing	Israel Abanikanda	12 CAR, 43 YDS
PITT	Receiving	Taysir Mack	4 REC, 100 YDS
TENN	Passing	Hendon Hooker	15/21, 188 YDS, 2 TD, 1 INT
TENN	Rushing	Joe Milton	5 CAR, 54 YDS
TENN	Receiving	Jimmy Calloway	3 REC, 59 YDS, 1 TD

Scoring summary

Quarter	Time	Drive			Team	Scoring information	Score	
Quarter	Time	Plays	Yards	TOP	Team	Scoring information	PIT	TEN
1	13:34	1	2	0:03	TENN	Jabari Small 2-yard touchdown run, Chase McGrath kick good	0	7
1	4:44	10	31	2:53	TENN	37-yard field goal by Chase McGrath	0	10
2	14:53	11	92	4:45	PITT	Melquise Stovall 11-yard touchdown reception from Kenny Pickett, Sam Scarton kick good	7	10
2	11:16	8	44	3:37	TENN	48-yard field goal by Chase McGrath	7	13
2	9:25	5	75	1:51	PITT	Lucas Krull 16-yard touchdown reception from Jared Wayne, Sam Scarton kick good	14	13
2	8:34	4	-2	0:39	PITT	38-yard field goal by Sam Scarton	17	13
2	3:53	9	39	3:50	PITT	27-yard field goal by Sam Scarton	20	13
2	2:16	4	68	1:28	TENN	Jimmy Calloway 44-yard touchdown reception from Hendon Hooker, Chase McGrath kick good	20	20
2	0:19	9	75	1:57	PITT	Vincent Davis 2-yard touchdown run, Sam Scarton kick good	27	20
3	4:49	11	60	5:14	PITT	Kenny Pickett 1-yard touchdown run, Sam Scarton kick good	34	20
3	2:32	6	63	2:10	TENN	Jacob Warren 8-yard touchdown reception from Hendon Hooker, Chase McGrath kick good	34	27
4	12:22	6	75	2:31	PITT	Jordan Addison 8-yard touchdown reception from Kenny Pickett, Sam Scarton kick good	41	27
4	10:09	7	61	2:06	TENN	Jaylan Wright 1-yard touchdown run, Chase McGrath kick good	41	34
"TOP" = time of possession. For other American football terms, see Glossary of American football.							41	34

=== Western Michigan ===
Western Michigan Broncos at Pittsburgh Panthers

Quarter	1	2	3	4	Total
Western Michigan Broncos	14	13	7	10	44
Pittsburgh Panthers	7	20	7	7	41

at Heinz Field, Pittsburgh, PA

- Date: September 18, 2021
- Game time: 12:00 p.m. EST
- Game weather: Sunny, 81 °F (27 °C)
- Game attendance: 40,581
- Referee: Tim O'Dey
- TV: ACCRSN

Statistics	WMU	PITT
First downs	27	25
Plays–yards	85–517	58–508
Rushes–yards	48–160	24–93
Passing yards	357	415
Passing: comp–att–int	26–37–0	25–34–1
Turnovers		
Time of possession	40:15	19:45

Team	Category	Player	Statistics
WMU	Passing	Kaleb Eleby	23/34, 337 YDS, 3 TD
WMU	Rushing	Sean Tyler	14 CAR, 84 YDS, 1 TD
WMU	Receiving	Corey Crooms	8 REC, 161 YDS, 1 TD
PITT	Passing	Kenny Pickett	23/31, 382 YDS, 6 TD, 1 INT
PITT	Rushing	Kenny Pickett	9 CAR, 57 YDS
PITT	Receiving	Jordan Addison	6 REC, 124 YDS, 3 TD

Scoring summary

Quarter	Time	Drive			Team	Scoring information	Score	
Quarter	Time	Plays	Yards	TOP	Team	Scoring information	West Michigan	PIT
"TOP" = time of possession. For other American football terms, see Glossary of American football.							0	0

=== No. 21 (FCS) New Hampshire ===
No. 21 (FCS) New Hampshire Wildcats at Pittsburgh Panthers

Quarter	1	2	3	4	Total
No. 21 (FCS) New Hampshire Wildcats	0	7	0	0	7
Pittsburgh Panthers	28	21	21	7	77

at Heinz Field, Pittsburgh, PA

- Date: September 25, 2021
- Game time: 12:00 p.m. EST
- Game weather: Cloudy, 66 °F (19 °C)
- Game attendance: 41,048
- Referee: Ricky Johnson
- TV: ACCNX/ESPN+

Statistics	UNH	PITT
First downs	8	35
Plays–yards	53–160	82–707
Rushes–yards	29–100	49–252
Passing yards	60	455
Passing: comp–att–int	10–24–1	29–33–0
Turnovers		
Time of possession	24:37	35:23

Team	Category	Player	Statistics
UNH	Passing	Bret Edwards	9/20, 42 YDS, 1 TD, 1 INT
UNH	Rushing	Carlos Washington Jr.	9 CAR, 91 YDS
UNH	Receiving	Griffin Helm	2 REC, 24 YDS
PITT	Passing	Kenny Pickett	24/28, 403 YDS, 5 TD
PITT	Rushing	Rodney Hammond Jr.	17 CAR, 100 YDS, 3 TD
PITT	Receiving	Jordan Addison	6 REC, 179 YDS, 3 TD

Scoring summary

Quarter	Time	Drive			Team	Scoring information	Score	
Quarter	Time	Plays	Yards	TOP	Team	Scoring information	New Hampshire	PIT
"TOP" = time of possession. For other American football terms, see Glossary of American football.							0	0

=== At Georgia Tech ===
Pittsburgh Panthers at Georgia Tech Yellow Jackets

Quarter	1	2	3	4	Total
Pittsburgh Panthers	21	21	7	3	52
Georgia Tech Yellow Jackets	7	7	7	0	21

at Bobby Dodd Stadium, Atlanta, GA

- Date: October 2, 2021
- Game time: 12:00 p.m. EST
- Game weather: Cloudy, 75 °F (24 °C)
- Game attendance: 36,383
- Referee: Stuart Mullins
- TV announcers (ACCN): Wes Durham, Roddy Jones, Lericia Harris

Statistics	PITT	GA Tech
First downs	27	21
Plays–yards	78–580	64–432
Rushes–yards	41–181	31–73
Passing yards	399	359
Passing: comp–att–int	24–37–0	24–33–2
Turnovers		
Time of possession	34:40	25:20

Team	Category	Player	Statistics
PITT	Passing	Kenny Pickett	23/36, 389 YDS, 4 TD
PITT	Rushing	Israel Abanikanda	15 CAR, 60 YDS, 2 TD
PITT	Receiving	Taysir Mack	5 REC, 121 YDS, 1 YD
GA Tech	Passing	Jeff Sims	24/33, 359 YDS, 2 TD, 2 INT
GA Tech	Rushing	Dontae Smith	9 CAR, 43 YDS, 1 TD
GA Tech	Receiving	Jahmyr Gibbs	6 REC, 125 YDS

Scoring summary

Quarter	Time	Drive			Team	Scoring information	Score	
Quarter	Time	Plays	Yards	TOP	Team	Scoring information	PIT	Georgia Tech
"TOP" = time of possession. For other American football terms, see Glossary of American football.							0	0

=== At Virginia Tech ===
Pittsburgh Panthers at Virginia Tech Hokies

Quarter	1	2	3	4	Total
Pittsburgh Panthers	7	14	7	0	28
Virginia Tech Hokies	0	0	7	0	7

at Lane Stadium, Blacksburg, VA

- Date: October 16, 2021
- Game time: 3:30 p.m. EST
- Game weather: Cloudy, 56 °F (13 °C)
- Game attendance: 58,314
- Referee: Stuart Mullins
- TV: ESPN2

Statistics	PITT	VA Tech
First downs	22	13
Plays–yards	81–411	60–224
Rushes–yards	44–208	28–90
Passing yards	203	134
Passing: comp–att–int	22–37–1	11–32–1
Turnovers		
Time of possession	38:16	21:44

Team	Category	Player	Statistics
PITT	Passing	Kenny Pickett	22/37, 203 YDS, 2 TD
PITT	Rushing	Israel Abanikanda	21 CAR, 140 YDS
PITT	Receiving	Jared Wayne	6 REC, 94 YDS, 1 TD
VA Tech	Passing	Braxton Burmeister	11/32, 134 YDS, 1 TD, 1 INT
VA Tech	Rushing	Malachi Thomas	6 CAR, 33 YDS
VA Tech	Receiving	Tré Turner	3 REC, 73 YDS

Scoring summary

Quarter	Time	Drive			Team	Scoring information	Score	
Quarter	Time	Plays	Yards	TOP	Team	Scoring information	PITT	VA TECH
1	7:53	15	94	5:53	PITT	Gavin Barthomolew 8-yard touchdown reception from Kenny Pickett, Sam Scarton kick good	7	0
2	5:52	4	29	1:32	PITT	Kenny Pickett 3-yard touchdown run, Sam Scarton kick good	14	0
2	1:36	5	81	1:36	PITT	Jared Wayne 36-yard touchdown reception from Kenny Pickett, Sam Scarton kick good	21	0
3	9:16	10	52	4:29	PITT	Vincent Davis 5-yard touchdown run, Sam Scarton kick good	28	0
3	6:33	7	75	2:43	VA TECH	Tayvion Robinson 2-yard touchdown reception from Braxton Burmiester, John Parker Romo kick good	28	7
"TOP" = time of possession. For other American football terms, see Glossary of American football.							28	7

=== Clemson ===
Clemson Tigers at Pittsburgh Panthers

Quarter	1	2	3	4	Total
Clemson Tigers	7	0	3	7	17
No. 23 Pittsburgh Panthers	0	14	10	3	27

at Heinz Field, Pittsburgh, PA

- Date: October 23rd, 2021
- Game time: 3:30 p.m. EST
- Game weather: Cloudy, 52 °F (11 °C)
- Game attendance: 60,594
- Referee: Jeff Flanagan
- TV announcers (ESPN): Sean McDonough (play-by-play), Todd Blackledge (analyst), Molly McGrath (sideline)

Statistics	CLEM	PITT
First downs	19	26
Plays–yards	62–315	82–464
Rushes–yards	30–164	43–162
Passing yards	151	302
Passing: comp–att–int	15–32–2	25–39–0
Turnovers		
Time of possession	23:53	36:07

Team	Category	Player	Statistics
CLEM	Passing	DJ Uiagalelei	12/25, 128 YDS, 2 INT
CLEM	Rushing	Will Shipley	10 CAR, 52 YDS
CLEM	Receiving	Justyn Ross	5 REC, 59 YDS
PITT	Passing	Kenny Pickett	25/39, 302 YDS, 2 TD
PITT	Rushing	Rodney Hammond Jr.	11 CAR, 66 YDS
PITT	Receiving	Jordan Addison	5 REC, 84 YDS, 1 TD

Scoring summary

Quarter	Time	Drive			Team	Scoring information	Score	
Quarter	Time	Plays	Yards	TOP	Team	Scoring information	CLEM	PIT
1	1:29	8	80	3:29	CLEM	Phil Mafah 1-yard touchdown run, B. T. Potter kick good	7	0
2	3:18	13	90	4:19	PITT	Jordan Addison 23-yard touchdown reception from Kenny Pickett, Sam Scarton kick good	7	7
2	0:40	9	76	2:12	PITT	Taysir Mack 39-yard touchdown reception from Kenny Pickett, Sam Scarton kick good	7	14
3	11:30				PITT	Interception returned 50 yards for touchdown by SirVocea Dennis, Sam Scarton kick good	7	21
3	6:56	11	45	4:27	CLEM	42-yard field goal by B. T. Potter	10	21
3	1:10	11	49	5:46	PITT	44-yard field goal by Sam Scarton	10	24
4	9:30	11	64	5:48	PITT	34-yard field goal by Sam Scarton	10	27
4	7:56	5	72	1:28	CLEM	DJ Uiagalelei 6-yard touchdown run, B. T. Potter kick good	17	27
"TOP" = time of possession. For other American football terms, see Glossary of American football.							17	27

=== Miami (FL) ===
Miami (FL) Hurricanes at Pittsburgh Panthers

Quarter	1	2	3	4	Total
Miami (FL) Hurricanes	21	10	7	0	38
No. 17 Pittsburgh Panthers	10	7	14	3	34

at Heinz Field, Pittsburgh, PA

- Date: October 30, 2021
- Game time: 12:00 p.m. EST
- Game weather: Cloudy, 53 °F (12 °C)
- Game attendance: 46,977
- Referee: Jeff Heaser
- TV announcers (ACCN): Chris Cotter (play-by-play), Mark Herzlich (analyst), Jalyn Johnson (sideline)

Statistics	Miami (FL)	PITT
First downs	27	30
Plays–yards	71–490	79–587
Rushes–yards	29–64	23–68
Passing yards	426	519
Passing: comp–att–int	32–42–1	39–56–2
Turnovers		
Time of possession	30:39	29:21

Team	Category	Player	Statistics
Miami (FL)	Passing	Tyler Van Dyke	32/42, 426 YDS, 3 TD, 1 INT
Miami (FL)	Rushing	Jaylan Knighton	17 CAR, 80 YDS, 2 TD
Miami (FL)	Receiving	Charleston Rambo	7 REC, 101 YDS
PITT	Passing	Kenny Pickett	39/55, 519 YDS, 3 TD, 2 INT
PITT	Rushing	Vincent Davis	6 CAR, 45 YDS
PITT	Receiving	Jordan Addison	8 REC, 145 YDS

Scoring summary

Quarter	Time	Drive			Team	Scoring information	Score	
Quarter	Time	Plays	Yards	TOP	Team	Scoring information	Miami (FL)	PIT
1	12:09	8	75	2:51	PITT	Israel Abanikanda 1-yard touchdown run, Sam Scarton kick good	0	7
1	10:31	5	75	1:38	MIAMI	Elijah Arroyo 20-yard touchdown reception from Tyler Van Dyke, Andres Borregales kick good	7	7
1	8:44	3	70	0:44	MIAMI	Will Mallory 57-yard touchdown reception from Tyler Van Dyke, Andres Borregales kick good	14	7
1	6:20	2	60	0:34	MIAMI	Jaylan Knighton 40-yard touchdown run, Andres Borregales kick good	21	7
1	3:25	9	55	2:55	PITT	38-yard field goal by Sam Scarton	21	10
2	12:50	7	84	2:17	PITT	Israel Abanikanda 20-yard touchdown reception from Kenny Pickett, Sam Scarton kick good	21	17
2	10:16	9	72	2:28	MIAMI	26-yard field goal by Andres Borregales	24	17
2	4:02	4	37	1:35	MIAMI	Jaylan Knighton 1-yard touchdown run, Andres Borregales kick good	31	17
3	11:18	5	27	1:35	PITT	Jared Wayne 12-yard touchdown reception from Kenny Pickett, Sam Scarton kick good	31	24
3	5:50	6	91	2:53	PITT	Jaylon Barden 19-yard touchdown reception from Kenny Pickett, Sam Scarton kick good	31	31
3	2:15	11	50	3:12	MIAMI	Key'Shawn Smith 13-yard touchdown reception from Tyler Van Dyke, Andres Borregales kick good	38	31
4	13:55	11	50	3:12	PITT	23-yard field goal by Sam Scarton	38	34
"TOP" = time of possession. For other American football terms, see Glossary of American football.							38	35

=== At Duke ===
Pittsburgh Panthers at Duke Blue Devils

Quarter	1	2	3	4	Total
No. 25 Pittsburgh Panthers	7	23	14	10	54
Duke Blue Devils	12	7	3	7	29

at Wallace Wade Stadium, Durham, NC

- Date: November 6, 2021
- Game time: 12:00 p.m. EST
- Game weather: Sunny, 57 °F (14 °C)
- Game attendance: 20,693
- Referee: Marcus Woods
- TV: ACCN

Statistics	PITT	Duke
First downs	30	26
Plays–yards	86–636	88–376
Rushes–yards	42–220	50–135
Passing yards	416	241
Passing: comp–att–int	28–44–0	23–38–1
Turnovers		
Time of possession	27:43	32:17

Team	Category	Player	Statistics
PITT	Passing	Kenny Pickett	28/43, 416 YDS, 3 TD
PITT	Rushing	Rodney Hammond Jr.	16 CAR, 81 YDS, 1 TD
PITT	Receiving	Jordan Addison	7 REC, 171 YDS, 1 TD
Duke	Passing	Gunnar Holmberg	16/23, 174 YDS, 1 TD
Duke	Rushing	Mataeo Durant	24 CAR, 89 YDS
Duke	Receiving	Jalon Calhoun	3 REC, 78 YDS, 1 TD

Scoring summary

Quarter	Time	Drive			Team	Scoring information	Score	
Quarter	Time	Plays	Yards	TOP	Team	Scoring information	PIT	Duke
"TOP" = time of possession. For other American football terms, see Glossary of American football.							54	29

=== North Carolina ===
North Carolina Tar Heels at Pittsburgh Panthers

Quarter	1	2	3	4	OT	Total
North Carolina Tar Heels	0	7	6	10	0	23
No. 21 Pittsburgh Panthers	17	6	0	0	7	30

at Heinz Field, Pittsburgh, PA

- Date: November 11
- Game time: 7:30 p.m. EST
- Game weather: Cloudy, 66 °F (19 °C)
- Game attendance: 41,687
- Referee: Jerry Maggallanes
- TV announcers (ESPN): Matt Barrie (play-by-play), Roddy Jones (analyst), Katie George (sideline)

Statistics	UNC	PITT
First downs	16	24
Plays–yards	71–384	76–441
Rushes–yards	38–88	31–95
Passing yards	296	346
Passing: comp–att–int	22–33–1	25–45–1
Turnovers		
Time of possession	34:11	25:49

Team	Category	Player	Statistics
UNC	Passing	Sam Howell	22/33, 296 YDS, 2 TD, 1 INT
UNC	Rushing	Ty Chandler	14 CAR, 42 YDS
UNC	Receiving	Antoine Green	3 REC, 108 YDS, 2 TD
PITT	Passing	Kenny Pickett	25/43, 346 YDS, 3 TD, 1 INT
PITT	Rushing	Israel Abanikanda	12 CAR, 63 YDS
PITT	Receiving	Jordan Addison	6 REC, 84 YDS

Scoring summary

Quarter	Time	Drive			Team	Scoring information	Score	
Quarter	Time	Plays	Yards	TOP	Team	Scoring information	UNC	PITT
1	8:00	4	20	1:30	PITT	Vincent Davis 2-yard touchdown run, good kick Sam Scarton	0	7
1	4:09	4	48	1:32	PITT	Gavin Bartholomew 1-yard touchdown reception from Kenny Pickett, Sam Scarton kick good	0	14
1	0:10	7	62	2:13	PITT	34-yard field goal by Sam Scarton	0	17
2	6:24	3	80	1:55	UNC	Antoine Green 76-yard touchdown reception from Sam Howell, Grayson Atkins kick good	7	17
2	4:40	4	77	1:37	PITT	Jared Wayne 32-yard touchdown reception from Kenny Pickett, Sam Scarton kick no good	7	23
3	5:39	8	53	2:20	UNC	Antoine Green 23-yard touchdown reception from Sam Howell, 2-point run by Sam Howell failed	13	23
4	5:34	11	92	6:14	UNC	Sam Howell 1-yard touchdown run, Grayson Atkins kick good	20	23
4	0:57	10	32	4:29	UNC	20-yard field goal by Grayson Atkins	23	23
OT		4	25		PITT	Lucas Krull 11-yard touchdown reception from Kenny Pickett, Sam Scarton kick good	23	30
"TOP" = time of possession. For other American football terms, see Glossary of American football.							23	30

=== Virginia ===
Virginia Cavaliers at Pittsburgh Panthers

Quarter	1	2	3	4	Total
Virginia Cavaliers	7	14	10	7	38
No. 18 Pittsburgh Panthers	0	24	10	14	48

at Heinz Field, Pittsburgh, PA

- Date: November 20, 2021
- Game time: 3:30 p.m. EST
- Game weather: Sunny, 49 °F (9 °C)
- Game attendance: 45,183
- Referee: Mike Roche
- TV: ESPN2

Statistics	UVA	PITT
First downs	27	28
Plays–yards	78–514	80–509
Rushes–yards	24–27	38–169
Passing yards	487	340
Passing: comp–att–int	36–51–1	26–42–2
Turnovers		
Time of possession	30:05	29:55

Team	Category	Player	Statistics
UVA	Passing	Brennan Armstrong	36/49, 487 YDS, 3 TD, 1 INT
UVA	Rushing	Mike Hollins	7 CAR, 30 YDS, 1 TD
UVA	Receiving	Dontayvion Wicks	10 REC, 144 YDS
PITT	Passing	Kenny Pickett	26/41, 340 YDS, 4 TD, 2 INT
PITT	Rushing	Vincent Davis	12 CAR, 100 YDS
PITT	Receiving	Jordan Addison	14 REC, 202 YDS, 4 TD

Scoring summary

Quarter	Time	Drive			Team	Scoring information	Score	
Quarter	Time	Plays	Yards	TOP	Team	Scoring information	Virginia	PIT
"TOP" = time of possession. For other American football terms, see Glossary of American football.							38	48

=== At Syracuse ===
Pittsburgh Panthers at Syracuse Orange

Quarter	1	2	3	4	Total
No. 17 Pittsburgh Panthers	0	14	14	3	31
Syrancuse Orange	7	0	7	0	14

at Carrier Dome, Syracuse, NY

- Date: November 27, 2021
- Game time: 7:30 p.m. EST
- Game weather: None (indoor stadium)
- Game attendance: 27,939
- Referee: Riley Johnson
- TV: ACCN

Statistics	PITT	CUSE
First downs	20	14
Plays–yards	72–333	54–242
Rushes–yards	34–124	30–25
Passing yards	209	217
Passing: comp–att–int	28–38–1	17–24–0
Turnovers		
Time of possession	33:04	26:56

Team	Category	Player	Statistics
PITT	Passing	Kenny Pickett	28/38, 209 YDS, 4 TD, 1 INT
PITT	Rushing	Vincent Davis	13 CAR, 79 YDS
PITT	Receiving	Jordan Addison	11 REC, 81 YDS, 2 TD
CUSE	Passing	Garrett Shrader	17/24, 217 YDS, 2 TD
CUSE	Rushing	Sean Tucker	13 CAR, 29 YDS
CUSE	Receiving	Courtney Jackson	7 REC, 73 YDS, 2 TD

Scoring summary

Quarter	Time	Drive			Team	Scoring information	Score	
Quarter	Time	Plays	Yards	TOP	Team	Scoring information	PIT	Syracuse
"TOP" = time of possession. For other American football terms, see Glossary of American football.							0	0

=== Vs. No. 16 Wake Forest ===
2021 ACC Championship Game: Pittsburgh Panthers vs. Wake Forest Demon Deacons

Quarter	1	2	3	4	Total
No. 15 Pittsburgh Panthers	14	10	7	14	45
No. 16 Wake Forest Demon Deacons	21	0	0	0	21

at Bank of America Stadium, Charlotte, NC

- Date: December 4, 2021
- Game time: 8:00 p.m. EST
- Game weather: Sunny, 61 °F (16 °C)
- Game attendance: 57,856
- Referee: Gary Patterson
- TV: ABC

Statistics	PITT	WAKE
First downs	22	24
Plays–yards	72–385	85–295
Rushes–yards	38–112	39–82
Passing yards	273	213
Passing: comp–att–int	21–34–0	21–46–4
Turnovers		
Time of possession	31:13	28:47

Team	Category	Player	Statistics
PITT	Passing	Kenny Pickett	20/33, 253 YDS, 2 TD
PITT	Rushing	Israel Abanikanda	9 CAR, 55 YDS, 2 TD
PITT	Receiving	Jordan Addison	8 REC, 126 YDS
WAKE	Passing	Sam Hartman	21/46, 213 YDS, 2 TD, 4 INT
WAKE	Rushing	Christian Turner	6 CAR, 34 YDS
WAKE	Receiving	Taylor Morin	4 REC, 83 YDS, 1 TD

Scoring summary

Quarter	Time	Drive			Team	Scoring information	Score	
Quarter	Time	Plays	Yards	TOP	Team	Scoring information	PITT	WAKE
1	13:42	5	75	1:18	PITT	Kenny Pickett 58-yard touchdown run, Sam Scarton kick good	7	0
1	10:48	11	75	2:54	WAKE	A. T. Perry 5-yard touchdown reception from Sam Hartman, Nick Sciba kick good	7	7
1	9:37	4	75	1:11	PITT	Rodney Hammond 22-yard touchdown reception from Kenny Pickett, Sam Scarton kick good	14	7
1	6:31	12	75	3:06	WAKE	Sam Hartman 11-yard touchdown run, Nick Sciba kick good	14	14
1	3:07	4	69	1:09	WAKE	Taylor Morin 26-yard touchdown reception from Sam Hartman, Nick Sciba kick good	14	21
2	8:21	5	32	1:21	PITT	Jared Wayne 4-yard touchdown reception from Kenny Pickett, Sam Scarton kick good	21	21
2	0:00	5	57	0:55	PITT	41-yard field goal by Sam Scarton	24	21
3	0:47	4	45	1:20	PITT	Israel Abanikanda 12-yard touchdown run, Sam Scarton kick good	31	21
4	11:57	3	3	1:29	PITT	Israel Abanikanda 1-yard touchdown run, Sam Scarton kick good	38	21
4	11:42	1	0	0:15	PITT	Interception returned 19 yards for touchdown by Erick Hallett, Sam Scarton kick good	45	21
"TOP" = time of possession. For other American football terms, see Glossary of American football.							45	21

=== Vs. No. 10 Michigan State ===
2021 Chick-fil-A Peach Bowl: Pittsburgh Panthers vs. Michigan State Spartans

Quarter	1	2	3	4	Total
No. 12 Pittsburgh Panthers	7	7	7	0	21
No. 10 Michigan State Spartans	10	0	0	21	31

at Mercedes Benz Stadium, Atlanta, GA

- Date: December 30
- Game time: 7:00 p.m. EST
- Game weather: None (indoor stadium)
- Game attendance: 41,230
- Referee: Steve Marlowe
- TV announcers (ESPN): Mark Jones (play-by-play), Robert Griffin III (analyst), Quint Kessenich (sideline)

Statistics	PITT	MSU
First downs	14	25
Plays–yards	55–274	86–410
Rushes–yards	32–104	36–56
Passing yards	170	354
Passing: comp–att–int	16–23–1	29–50–1
Turnovers		
Time of possession	24:51	35:09

Team	Category	Player	Statistics
PITT	Passing	Davis Beville	14/18, 149 YDS, 1 TD, 1 INT
PITT	Rushing	Vincent Davis	12 CAR, 43 YDS
PITT	Receiving	Jordan Addison	7 REC, 114 YDS
MSU	Passing	Payton Thorne	29/50, 354 YDS, 3 TD, 1 INT
MSU	Rushing	Jordon Simmons	16 CAR, 23 YDS
MSU	Receiving	Jalen Nailor	6 REC, 108 YDS,

Scoring summary

Quarter	Time	Drive			Team	Scoring information	Score	
Quarter	Time	Plays	Yards	TOP	Team	Scoring information	PITT	MSU
1	13:11	3	29	0:45	MSU	Jayden Reed 28-yard touchdown reception from Payton Thorne, Matt Coghlin kick good	0	7
1	7:57	12	75	5:14	PITT	Nick Patti 16-yard touchdown run, Sam Scarton kick good	7	7
1	2:39	11	57	5:18	MSU	36-yard field goal by Matt Coghlin	7	10
2	1:02	6	87	1:01	PITT	Jared Wayne 4-yard touchdown reception from Davis Beville, Sam Scarton kick good	14	10
3	14:40	3	1	0:20	PITT	Fumble recovery returned 26 yards for touchdown by Cam Bright, Sam Scarton kick no good	21	10
4	8:06	13	70	6:47	MSU	Connor Heyward 15-yard touchdown reception from Payton Thorne, 2-point Pass no good	21	16
4	2:51	11	71	2:46	MSU	Jayden Reed 22-yard touchdown reception from Payton Thorne, 2-point Pass good	21	24
4	0:22	8	49	2:29	MSU	Interception returned 78 yards for touchdown by Cal Halladay, Matt Coghlin kick good	21	31
"TOP" = time of possession. For other American football terms, see Glossary of American football.							21	31

== Players drafted into the NFL ==
Round	Pick	Player	Position	NFL Club
1	20	Kenny Pickett	QB	Pittsburgh Steelers
4	115	Damarri Mathis	CB	Denver Broncos
