= Kevan Smith (baseball) =

American baseball player (born 1988)

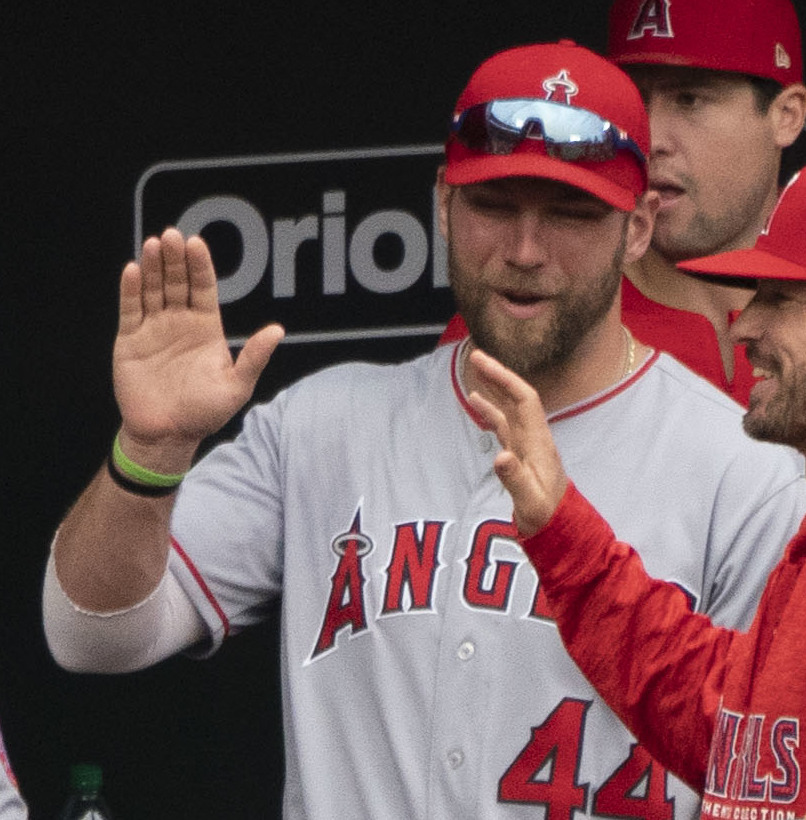
- Smith with the Los Angeles Angels in 2019
- Catcher
- Born: June 28, 1988 (age 38); Pittsburgh, Pennsylvania, U.S.
- Batted: Right Threw: Right

MLB debut
- September 1, 2016, for the Chicago White Sox

Last MLB appearance
- August 8, 2021, for the Atlanta Braves

MLB statistics
- Batting average: .259
- Home runs: 13
- Runs batted in: 82
- Stats at Baseball Reference

Teams
- Chicago White Sox (2016–2018); Los Angeles Angels (2019); Tampa Bay Rays (2020–2021); Atlanta Braves (2021)

Kevan Alan Smith (born June 28, 1988) is an American former professional baseball catcher. He played in Major League Baseball (MLB) for the Chicago White Sox, Los Angeles Angels, Tampa Bay Rays, and Atlanta Braves. Prior to playing professionally, Smith attended the University of Pittsburgh, where he played for the Pittsburgh Panthers baseball and football teams. The White Sox selected Smith in the seventh round of the 2011 Major League Baseball draft. He made his MLB debut in 2016.

== Amateur career ==
Smith attended Seneca Valley High School in Harmony, Pennsylvania, graduating in 2006. During his high school career, he played for the school's American football team as a quarterback, but was limited to only 12 games.

Smith enrolled at the University of Pittsburgh and played for the Pittsburgh Panthers football team. He redshirted during his first year at Pittsburgh, in 2006, and became the Panthers' starting quarterback in 2007 following an injury to Bill Stull. He lost his starting role to Pat Bostick, a freshman, after struggling in a 2007 game against the Michigan State Spartans. He appeared in five games during the 2007 season, and one game during the 2008 season.

After the 2008 season, coach Dave Wannstedt and offensive coordinator Matt Cavanaugh approached Smith about changing positions. As Smith had increased his weight training, they considered moving him to outside linebacker or tight end. He instead opted to quit football so that he could play for the Pittsburgh Panthers baseball team. For the baseball team, Smith had a .375 batting average, 19 home runs and 123 runs batted in (RBIs) in his three seasons. He was twice named an All-Big East Conference selection and twice named to the All-Tournament Team in the Big East Conference baseball tournament.

== Professional career ==
=== Chicago White Sox ===
The Chicago White Sox selected Smith in the seventh round (231st overall) of the 2011 Major League Baseball draft. He began his career with the Bristol White Sox of the Rookie-level Appalachian League. He was promoted mid season to the Great Falls Voyagers of the Rookie-level Pioneer League. He began the 2012 season with the Kannapolis Intimidators of the Single-A South Atlantic League. Towards the end of the season, Smith was promoted to the Winston Salem Dash of the High-A Carolina League. In 2013, Smith played the whole season for Winston-Salem.

In 2014, Smith played for the Birmingham Barons of the Double-A Southern League. He hit .290 with 10 home runs and 48 RBIs in 106 games for Birmingham, and threw out 33 percent of baserunners attempting stolen bases. After the 2014 season, the White Sox assigned Smith to the Glendale Desert Dogs of the Arizona Fall League. On November 20, 2014, the White Sox added Smith to their 40-man roster. Smith spent the 2015 season with the Charlotte Knights of the Triple-A International League, and began 2016 in Charlotte.

With Alex Avila going on the disabled list, the White Sox promoted Smith to the major leagues on April 24, 2016. Smith was scratched from the lineup on April 25 with back spasms, and the White Sox put Smith on the disabled list due to sacroiliac joint dysfunction the next day. On May 22, 2016, he was activated from the 15-day disabled list and returned to Charlotte. One game after his activation with the Knights, he went back on the disabled list. The White Sox promoted Smith to the major leagues on September 1, and he made his major league debut that day. He recorded his first two major league hits on September 17. On February 10, 2017, Smith cleared waivers and was outrighted to Charlotte.

Smith began the 2017 season with Charlotte, and was promoted to the major leagues on April 13. In 2017 with the White Sox he batted .283/.309/.388 with 4 home runs and 30 RBIs in 273 at bats.

In 2018 with the White Sox he batted .292/.348/.380 with 3 home runs and 21 RBIs in 171 at bats.

=== Los Angeles Angels ===
On October 26, 2018, Smith was claimed off waivers by the Los Angeles Angels. Smith played in 67 games for the Angels in 2019, batting .251/.318/.393 with 5 home runs and 20 RBI. On December 2, 2019, Smith was non-tendered by the Angels and became a free agent.

=== Tampa Bay Rays ===
On January 11, 2020, Smith signed a minor league contract with the Tampa Bay Rays. Smith was promoted to the Rays' major league roster on July 21, after Colin Poche was placed on the injured list following a torn UCL. He was designated for assignment on August 9, and was outrighted by the Rays on August 12. On August 29, Smith was selected back to the active roster. On October 30, Smith was again outrighted off of the 40-man roster and elected free agency.

On December 29, 2020, Smith re-signed with the Rays on a minor league contract. On May 7, 2021, Smith was selected to the active roster. Smith notched one hit in five plate appearances before being designated for assignment by the Rays on May 16.

=== Atlanta Braves ===
On May 19, 2021, Smith was traded to the Atlanta Braves in exchange for cash considerations. On August 11, the Braves designated Smith for assignment to make room for Travis d'Arnaud. Smith elected free agency on August 13.
