= Dietrich Jells =

American football player (born 1972)

No. 83
- Position: Wide receiver

Personal information
- Born: April 11, 1972 (age 54); Brooklyn, New York, U.S.
- Listed height: 5 ft 10 in (1.78 m)
- Listed weight: 186 lb (84 kg)

Career information
- High school: Erie (PA) Tech
- College: Pittsburgh
- NFL draft: 1996: 6th round, 176th overall pick

Career history
- Kansas City Chiefs (1996)*; New England Patriots (1996–1997); Philadelphia Eagles (1998–1999)
- * Offseason or practice squad member only

Career NFL statistics
- Receptions: 14
- Receiving yards: 147
- Receiving touchdowns: 2
- Stats at Pro Football Reference

Dietrich Jells (born April 11, 1972) is an American former professional football player who was a wide receiver in the National Football League (NFL) from 1996 to 1999. He played college football for the Pittsburgh Panthers. In his first two seasons, he was a member of the New England Patriots after being selected by the Kansas City Chiefs in the 1996 NFL draft. With the Patriots, Jells appeared in Super Bowl XXXI, a Patriots loss. In 1998–99, he played with the Philadelphia Eagles. Jells scored two career touchdowns, both in 1999 as an Eagle.
