= Greg Lee (wide receiver) =

American football player (born 1984)

No. 9
- Position: Wide receiver

Personal information
- Born: October 19, 1984 (age 42); Tampa, Florida, U.S.
- Listed height: 6 ft 1 in (1.85 m)
- Listed weight: 202 lb (92 kg)

Career information
- High school: Tampa (FL) Chamberlain
- College: Pittsburgh
- NFL draft: 2006: undrafted

Career history
- Arizona Cardinals (2006–2007)*; Cologne Centurions (2007); Detroit Lions (2008)^{*}
- * Offseason or practice squad member only

Awards and highlights
- First-team All-Western Conference; All-Western Conference American Division

Greg Lee (born October 19, 1984) is an American former professional football wide receiver. He attended Chamberlain High School in Tampa, Florida, competed in football, basketball and track, and graduated in 2003. He played college football for two years at the University of Pittsburgh, during which time he amassed 117 receptions, 2259 receiving yards, and 17 touchdowns. He was not selected during the 2006 NFL draft, but signed as an undrafted free agent in 2006 with the Arizona Cardinals. He signed with the Detroit Lions on May 20, 2008.
