= Bill Stull =

American football player (born 1986)

No. 13
- Position: Quarterback

Personal information
- Born: December 18, 1986 (age 39); Pittsburgh, Pennsylvania, U.S.
- Listed height: 6 ft 3 in (1.91 m)
- Listed weight: 225 lb (102 kg)

Career information
- High school: Seton-La Salle Catholic (Mt. Lebanon, Pennsylvania)
- College: Pittsburgh
- NFL draft: 2010: undrafted

Career history
- Hartford Colonials (2010)*; Kansas City Chiefs (2010)*; Spokane Shock (2011); Pittsburgh Power (2011–2012); New Orleans VooDoo (2013)
- * Offseason or practice squad member only

Awards and highlights
- First-team All-Big East (2009)

Career AFL statistics
- Completions: 125
- Attempts: 220
- Passing yards: 1,442
- TD–INT: 25–9
- Stats at ArenaFan.com

William Thomas Stull (born December 18, 1986) is an American former professional football quarterback. He played college football for the Pittsburgh Panthers.

== Early life ==
Stull was born in Warren, Ohio. He lived in the small town of Newton Falls when in elementary school he moved with his family to Canfield, OH, Poland OH, Mt. Lebanon PA and then to Pittsburgh later. Stull started during his junior and senior years of high school, where he compiled a record of 19–4 for the Rebels. In his senior year, he threw for 3,310 yards, becoming the only quarterback in WPIAL history to pass for more than 3,000 yards in a single season. Stull also threw 40 touchdowns and only 15 interceptions, completing 239 of 387 passes (61.76%).

== College career ==
=== 2005–2007 ===
Stull first came on as a relief quarterback for starter Tyler Palko. In 2005, he played briefly in a game against Youngstown State and completed a 17-yard pass. In 2006, he completed 6 for 8 passes for 69 yards and a touchdown over the course of four games.

Following Palko's graduation, Stull was elevated to the starting position in 2007 as a junior. However, an injury to his thumb in the opening game against Eastern Michigan ended his season and he received a medical redshirt. Pat Bostick and Kevan Smith started at the position for the rest of the season.

=== 2008 ===
Stull completed 188 for 330 passes in twelve games in 2008 for 2,356 yards, throwing 9 touchdowns and 10 interceptions. This is the only season in Stull's career that he threw more picks than touchdowns. The Panthers finished the season with a 9–3 overall record. This placed them in a tie for second in the Big East, qualifying them for the 2008 Sun Bowl, which they lost 3–0 to Oregon State in the worst college football game in modern history.

=== 2009 ===
In his last year at the University of Pittsburgh, Stull threw for 2,633 yards, 21 touchdowns, and only 8 interceptions. At the end of the season, Stull and the Panthers won the Meineke Car Care Bowl, defeating 2009 North Carolina 19–17. He became the first quarterback since Dan Marino in 1981 to lead Pitt to 10 wins.

== Professional career ==
Stull went undrafted in the 2010 NFL draft and was later signed by the Hartford Colonials of the United Football League. Stull was released after receiving an offer from the Kansas City Chiefs of the National Football League to attend training camp.

Stull was signed by the Chiefs on August 17, 2010. He was released on August 30, 2010.

Stull was signed by the Spokane Shock of the Arena Football League (AFL) on March 1, 2011. He was released on June 30, 2011. With the Shock, Stull completed 7 of 11 passes for 68 yards, 3 touchdowns, and 1 interception. He also had 2 carries for 12 yards and 2 touchdowns.

Stull was signed by the AFL's Pittsburgh Power on July 1, 2011. He was named the starter for the Power's July 22 season finale against the Philadelphia Soul. Against the Soul, Stull completed 24 of 40 passes for 260 yards and 6 touchdowns, earning him National Guard MVP Honors for the game.

Stull was assigned to the New Orleans VooDoo of the AFL on April 25, 2013.
