= Norman "Bill" Budd =

American football player and coach (1887–1966)

Biographical details
- Born: October 13, 1887; Sharon, Pennsylvania, U.S.
- Died: January 6, 1966 (aged 78); Chesterton, Indiana, U.S.

Playing career
- 1910: Pittsburgh
- Position: Quarterback

Coaching career (HC unless noted)
- 1913–1914: Duquesne

Head coaching record
- Overall: 4–10–1

Norman John "Bill" Budd (October 13, 1887 – January 6, 1966) was an American football player and coach. He served as the head football coach at Duquesne University from 1913 to 1914, compiling a record of 4–10–1. As a college football player, he was a quarterback at the University of Pittsburgh in 1910.

== Head coaching record ==
Year	Team	Overall	Conference	Standing	Bowl/playoffs
Duquesne Dukes (Independent) (1913–1914)
1913	Duquesne	3–5–1			
1914	Duquesne	1–5			
Duquesne:		4–10–1			
Total:		4–10–1			
