= Israel Abanikanda =

American football player (born 2002)

No. 37 – Dallas Cowboys
- Position: Running back
- Roster status: Practice squad

Personal information
- Born: October 5, 2002 (age 24); Brooklyn, New York, U.S.
- Listed height: 5 ft 10 in (1.78 m)
- Listed weight: 217 lb (98 kg)

Career information
- High school: Abraham Lincoln (Brooklyn)
- College: Pittsburgh (2020–2022)
- NFL draft: 2023: 5th round, 143rd overall pick

Career history
- New York Jets (2023–2024); San Francisco 49ers (2024); Green Bay Packers (2025)*; Dallas Cowboys (2025–present)
- * Offseason or practice squad member only

Awards and highlights
- First-team All-American (2022); First-team All-ACC (2022)

Career NFL statistics as of 2025
- Rushing yards: 70
- Rushing average: 3.2
- Receptions: 7
- Receiving yards: 43
- Stats at Pro Football Reference

Israel "Izzy" Adewale Abanikanda (born October 5, 2002) is an American professional football running back for the Dallas Cowboys of the National Football League (NFL). He played college football for the Pittsburgh Panthers and was selected by the New York Jets in the fifth round of the 2023 NFL draft. Abanikanda set the Pitt single game rushing record of 320 yards in a game against Virginia Tech in Week 6 of 2022, breaking the record of 303 yards set by Tony Dorsett in 1975. In the same game, he tied a school and ACC record of 6 rushing touchdowns in a game.

== Early life ==
Abanikanda attended Abraham Lincoln High School in Brooklyn, New York. His parents were immigrants from Nigeria. As a senior, he was the Gatorade Football Player of the Year for New York after rushing for 1,350 yards with 20 touchdowns. As he entered his senior season of high school, Abanikanda was ranked a three star recruit and received scholarship offers from seventeen schools. On June 24, 2019, Abanikanda committed to the University of Pittsburgh to play college football.

== College career ==
As a true freshman at Pittsburgh in 2020, Abanikanda played in seven games, rushing 28 times for 95 yards and one touchdown. As a sophomore in 2021, he played in all 13 games with six starts and rushed for 651 yards on 123 carries with seven touchdowns. Abanikanda also returned seven kicks for 206 yards, averaging 29.4 yards per attempt.

In July 2022, Abanikanda was named to the Paul Hornung Award Preseason Watchlist. Abanikanda returned to Pittsburgh as a starter in 2022. In Week 1 of the 2022 season, at the first Backyard Brawl between Pitt and West Virginia since 2011, Abanikanda rushed for only sixteen yards on eight carries. Following Rodney Hammond's injury at the game, Abanikanda stepped into a larger role. On September 10, 2022, against Tennessee, Abanikanda rushed for a 76-yard touchdown, Pitt's longest rushing touchdown since 2018. Abanikanda finished the game with a total of 154 rushing yards despite Pitt losing in overtime, 34–27. Abanikanda was named ACC Running Back of the Week for his performance in the game. Against Western Michigan, Abanikanda gained 133 yards on 31 carries and was named to the Paul Hornung Award Honor Roll.

On September 24, 2022, Abanikanda rushed nineteen times for a total of 177 yards against the Rhode Island Rams. Following the game, Abanikanda had earned a total of 479 rushing yards and six touchdowns on 83 carries for the season and was ranked second in the nation for all-purpose yards with an average of 180.24 yards. At the end of Week 4, Abanikanda also led the ACC in both rushing yards and all-purpose yards. For his performance against Rhode Island, he was named ACC Running Back of the Week for the second time of the 2022 season.

On October 1, 2022, Abanikanda suffered a shoulder injury in the second quarter and had to watch the remainder of the game from the sideline with his shoulder in a sling. Abanikanda recovered in time for the next game, and at Pitt's homecoming game on October 8, 2022, Pitt beat Virginia Tech with a score of 45–29. During the game, Abanikanda rushed for 320 yards, breaking the school record of 303 yards set by Tony Dorsett in 1975. In the same game, Abanikanda garnered six rushing touchdowns, tying the ACC conference single-game record set in 1981 and the Pitt single-game record set in 1910. Abanikanda received five honors for his performance in the game, including Doak Walker Running Back of the Week, Walter Camp National Offensive Player of the Week, Pro Football Focus National Offensive Player of the Week, ESPN College Football Final "Helmet Sticker", and his third ACC Running Back of the Week in the 2022 season.

Abanikanda finished the 2022 season with 1,431 yards and 20 touchdowns. He received the second most votes for ACC Player of the Year.

In January 2023, Abanikanda was invited to the NFL Scouting Combine.

=== Statistics ===
Year	Team	Games		Rushing				Receiving				Kick returns			
Year	Team	GP	GS	Att	Yards	Avg	TD	Rec	Yards	Avg	TD	Ret	Yards	Avg	TD
2020	Pittsburgh	7	0	28	95	3.4	1	2	11	5.5	1	0	0	0.0	0
2021	Pittsburgh	13	6	123	651	5.3	7	24	197	8.2	1	7	206	29.4	1
2022	Pittsburgh	11	11	239	1,431	6.0	20	12	146	12.2	1	12	228	19.0	0
Career		26	12	280	1,576	5.6	28	30	267	8.9	3	19	434	22.8	1

== Professional career ==
Pre-draft measurables
Height	Weight	Arm length	Hand span	Wingspan	40-yard dash	10-yard split	20-yard split	20-yard shuttle	Three-cone drill	Vertical jump	Broad jump
5 ft 10 1/8 in (1.78 m)	216 lb (98 kg)	32 in (0.81 m)	8 1/4 in (0.21 m)	6 ft 4 in (1.93 m)	4.45 s	1.50 s	2.53 s	4.32 s	7.14 s	41.0 in (1.04 m)	10 ft 8 in (3.25 m)
All values from NFL Combine/Pro Day

=== New York Jets ===
Abanikanda was selected by the New York Jets in the fifth round (143rd overall) of the 2023 NFL draft. He made his NFL debut in Week 11 against the Buffalo Bills. As a rookie, Abanikanda appeared in six games and had 22 carries for 70 rushing yards.

On December 2, 2024, Abanikanda was waived by the Jets.

=== San Francisco 49ers ===
On December 3, 2024, the San Francisco 49ers claimed Abanikanda off of waivers.

On July 24, 2025, Abanikanda was waived by the 49ers.

=== Green Bay Packers ===
On July 25, 2025, Abanikanda was claimed off waivers by the Green Bay Packers. He was released by the Packers on August 26, as part of final roster cuts and re-signed to the practice squad the next day. The Packers released Abanikanda on September 8.

=== Dallas Cowboys ===
On November 30, 2025, Abanikanda was signed to the Dallas Cowboys' practice squad. He signed a reserve/future contract with Dallas on January 6, 2026.

On August 30, 2026, Abanikanda was waived by the Cowboys as a part of final roster cuts; he was re–signed to the practice squad the following day. On September 12, he was signed to the active roster after running back Malik Davis was placed on injured reserve. He was waived on September 15 and re-signed to the practice squad two days later.

== NFL career statistics ==
Year	Team	Games		Rushing					Receiving					Fumbles	
Year	Team	GP	GS	Att	Yds	Avg	Lng	TD	Rec	Yds	Avg	Lng	TD	Fum	Lost
2023	NYJ	6	0	22	70	3.2	12	0	7	43	6.1	13	0	1	1
2024	NYJ	0	0	DNP											
2024	SF	0	0	DNP											
Career		6	0	22	70	3.2	12	0	7	43	6.1	13	0	1	1
