= Tino Sunseri =

American football player and coach (born 1988)

Indiana Hoosiers
- Title: Co-offensive coordinator and quarterbacks coach

Personal information
- Born: December 21, 1988 (age 37); Pittsburgh, Pennsylvania, U.S.
- Listed height: 6 ft 0 in (1.83 m)
- Listed weight: 215 lb (98 kg)

Career information
- Position: Quarterback (No. 8)
- High school: Central Catholic (Pittsburgh)
- College: Pittsburgh
- NFL draft: 2013: undrafted

Career history

Playing
- Saskatchewan Roughriders (2013–2015)

Coaching
- Florida State (2016–2017) Quality control assistant; Tennessee (2018) Quality control assistant; Alabama (2019–2020) Graduate assistant; James Madison (2021–2023) Quarterbacks coach; Indiana (2024) Co-offensive coordinator & quarterbacks coach; UCLA (2025) Offensive coordinator & quarterbacks coach; Indiana (2026–present) Co-offensive coordinator & quarterbacks coach

Awards and highlights
- As player: Grey Cup champion (2013); As coach: CFP national champion (2020)

Career CFL statistics
- TD–INT: 6–4
- Passing yards: 1,368
- Completion percentage: 62.3
- Passer rating: 89.6
- Stats at CFL.ca (archived)

Tino Sunseri (born December 21, 1988) is an American football coach and former quarterback who is the co-offensive coordinator and quarterbacks coach for the Indiana Hoosiers. He played college football for the Pittsburgh Panthers before being signed by the Saskatchewan Roughriders in 2013.

Sunseri was dismissed at UCLA in September 2025.

== College career ==
Tino Sunseri was the starting quarterback at the University of Pittsburgh for three years. A local Central Catholic grad, Tino led Pitt to a 20–19 record including three bowl appearances. He went undrafted in the 2013 NFL draft at the end of his senior year.

== Professional career ==
Sunseri shares the all-time professional football (NFL and CFL) individual record for the most two-point conversions scored in a single game, with three (for six points in total), with Philadelphia Eagles quarterback Carson Wentz, who had three conversions in the November 19, 2017, contest against the Dallas Cowboys. This is one short of the all-time team record of four scored by the St. Louis Rams during their game with the Atlanta Falcons on October 15, 2000. All conversions by Sunseri were done consecutively (via pass), in a 31–24 loss to the Calgary Stampeders on October 3, 2014. The three two-point conversions in a single game by one team is an all-time CFL record.

On June 15, 2015, Sunseri was among the Roughriders first cuts, and was released to free agency. On July 1, 2015, it was announced that he was re-signed to the Saskatchewan Roughriders due to a season-ending injury to the Roughriders' starting quarterback Darian Durant. General Manager Brendan Taman stated Tino's knowledge of Jacques Chapdelaine's offensive system was the key to his signing. On September 1, 2015, Sunseri was once again cut by the Roughriders. His cut was among the firing of the Roughriders head coach and general manager, after an 0–9 start to the 2015 season.

== Coaching career ==
Sunseri was a quarterbacks coach for the James Madison Dukes from 2021 to 2023. He became the Indiana Hoosiers' co-offensive coordinator in 2024, when they averaged 41.3 points per game and reached the College Football Playoff. After the season, Sunseri joined the UCLA Bruins as their offensive coordinator under head coach DeShaun Foster. However, Foster was fired following an 0–3 start in 2025. After the Bruins fell to 0–4, Sunseri and UCLA mutually agreed to part ways. The Bruins struggled offensively under Sunseri, ranking No. 132 out of 134 major college teams in scoring average at 14.2 points per game. They ranked No. 117 nationally with 321.2 total yards per game.

== Personal life ==
His father, Sal Sunseri, is a defensive coach for the University of Colorado Buffaloes and his younger brother, Vinnie Sunseri, who played defensive back at Alabama, was a 5th-round draft pick by the New Orleans Saints in the 2014 NFL draft and also played for the San Francisco 49ers.
