= John Turman =

American football player (born 1977)

John Turman (born September 19, 1977) is a former American football quarterback in the Arena Football League who played for the Detroit Fury. He played college football for the Pittsburgh Panthers.

He signed with the Pittsburgh Steelers after going undrafted in 2001.
