= John Congemi =

American gridiron football player (born 1964)

No. 15
- Position: Quarterback

Personal information
- Born: June 19, 1964 (age 62); Youngstown, Ohio, U.S.

Career information
- High school: Fort Lauderdale (FL) St. Thomas Aquinas
- College: Pittsburgh

Career history
- 1987–1990: Toronto Argonauts
- 1991: Ottawa Rough Riders
- 1992: Toronto Argonauts
- 1993: Miami Hooters
- 1993: Saskatchewan Roughriders
- 1994: Baltimore Stallions

Awards and highlights
- 1984 Fiesta Bowl MVP

John Congemi (born June 19, 1964) is a former Canadian Football League (CFL) quarterback and current college football analyst for ESPN.

Congemi played quarterback for the University of Pittsburgh Panthers football team during 1982–1986. He finished second all time in passing yards and led his team to the 1984 Fiesta Bowl. He won the game's MVP award, despite losing the game 28–23.

After college Congemi played in the CFL for the Toronto Argonauts, Ottawa Rough Riders, Saskatchewan Roughriders. In 1993, he also played part of the 1993 season with the Miami Hooters of the Arena Football League. After the stint, he returned to the CFL to play for the Baltimore Stallions in 1994.

After retiring, Congemi returned to his native Florida, where he worked as a football analyst for SportsChannel Florida and WQAM. Congemi served as a color commentator for the Big East Network from 2000 to 2011. He has been calling ESPNU games since the network began in 2005.
