= Alex Kessman =

American football player (born 1998)

No. 6, 17
- Position: Placekicker

Personal information
- Born: January 2, 1998 (age 28); Clarkston, Michigan, U.S.
- Listed height: 6 ft 3 in (1.91 m)
- Listed weight: 190 lb (86 kg)

Career information
- High school: Clarkston
- College: Pittsburgh
- NFL draft: 2021: undrafted

Career history
- Los Angeles Chargers (2021)*; New York Jets (2021); Carolina Panthers (2021)*; Memphis Showboats (2023)
- * Offseason or practice squad member only
- Stats at Pro Football Reference

Alex Thomas Kessman (born January 2, 1998) is an American former professional football player who was a placekicker for the New York Jets of the National Football League (NFL) in 2021. He also played in the United Football League for the Memphis Showboats in 2023. He played college football for the Pittsburgh Panthers

== College career ==
He played college football at the University of Pittsburgh. He set the NCAA record for most accurate placekicker in history from 50+ yards going 12 of 18 from that distance.

In October 2019, Kessman was named ACC Specialist of the Week after making four field goals during the game against Miami.

In 2020, in a game against Boston College, Kessman kicked a 58-yard field goal which tied the game and sent it into overtime. At the time, the 58-yard goal was the longest field goal in Panthers history. In 2024, Ben Sauls tied Kessman's record.

In 2021, Kessman received second-team All-ACC honors and was a semifinalist for the Lou Groza Award.

== Professional career ==
Pre-draft measurables
Height	Weight	Arm length	Hand span
6 ft 2 1/4 in (1.89 m)	189 lb (86 kg)	31 1/2 in (0.80 m)	9 1/4 in (0.23 m)
All values from Pro Day

=== Los Angeles Chargers ===
On May 2, 2021, Kessman signed as an undrafted free agent with the Los Angeles Chargers. However, Kessman was released by the Chargers prior to the start of the season on August 16, 2021.

=== New York Jets ===
On November 23, 2021, Kessman was signed to the practice squad of the New York Jets. On December 4, the Jets released incumbent kicker Matt Ammendola and signed Kessman to the active roster. In his one game with the Jets, which was also his NFL debut, Kessman missed both of his extra point attempts and the Jets lost to the Philadelphia Eagles by a score of 33–18. He was cut by the team the next day.

=== Carolina Panthers ===
On December 22, 2021, Kessman was signed to the Carolina Panthers practice squad. He was released on December 27.

=== Memphis Showboats ===
On January 28, 2023, Kessman signed with the Memphis Showboats of the United States Football League (USFL). He was removed from the roster on February 15, 2024.

== NFL career statistics ==
Regular season statistics
Season	Team	G	FGM	FGA	%	<20	20-29	30-39	40-49	50+	LNG	BLK	XPM	XPA	%	PTS
2021	NYJ	1	0	0	0.0	0-0	0-0	0-0	0-0	0-0	0	0	0	2	0.0	0
Career (1 game)		1	0	0	0.0	0-0	0-0	0-0	0-0	0-0	0	0	0	2	0.0	0
