= Jared Wayne =

Canadian player of American football (born 2000)

No. 86 – Miami Dolphins
- Position: Wide receiver
- Roster status: Active

Personal information
- Born: October 7, 2000 (age 26); Peterborough, Ontario, Canada
- Listed height: 6 ft 3 in (1.91 m)
- Listed weight: 210 lb (95 kg)

Career information
- High school: Clearwater Academy International (Clearwater, Florida, U.S.)
- College: Pittsburgh (2019–2022)
- NFL draft: 2023: undrafted
- CFL draft: 2023: 2nd round, 16th overall pick

Career history
- Houston Texans (2023–2026); Miami Dolphins (2026–present)

Awards and highlights
- Second-team All-ACC (2022)

Career NFL statistics as of Week 5, 2026
- Receptions: 6
- Receiving yards: 85
- Stats at Pro Football Reference

Jared Emmanuel Wayne (born October 7, 2000) is a Canadian professional football wide receiver for the Miami Dolphins of the National Football League (NFL). He played college football for the Pittsburgh Panthers.

== Early life ==
Wayne grew up in Peterborough, Ontario, where he attended Adam Scott Collegiate and Vocational Institute and spent his Grade 9 year playing quarterback for the Lions. Wayne then chose to play summer football with the Peterborough Wolverines of the Ontario Football Conference. He then transferred to Trinity College School in Port Hope, Ontario. Wayne attended Clearwater Academy International in Florida for his senior year. In his senior year, Wayne brought in 61 receptions for 1,157 yards and 14 touchdowns. He also threw for eight passes and completed five of them going for 55 yards and three touchdowns. Wayne also had one interception on defense. Wayne committed to play college football at the University of Pittsburgh over other school such as Bowling Green, Old Dominion, and South Florida.

== College career ==
In Wayne's first season with the Panthers in 2019 he caught 18 passes for 261 yards and one touchdown. In Wayne's second season he recorded 21 receptions for 326 yards and a touchdown. However, in Wayne's third season he took a huge step up making 47 catches for 658 yards and six touchdowns. In Wayne's final season in 2022 he had a breakout season. On October 29 Wayne had a great performance against North Carolina bringing in seven receptions and 160 yards. In Pittsburgh's season finale Wayne had the best game of his career after catching 11 passes for 199 yards and three touchdowns all career highs in a win against Miami. For his performance, he was named the ACC wide receiver of the week. On the season Wayne brought in 60 receptions for 1,063 yards and five touchdowns. For his performance on the year he was named Second Team All-ACC. He was also named one of the five finalists for the Jon Cornish trophy which is awarded to the best Canadian player. After the conclusion of the 2022 season, Wayne declared for the NFL draft. Wayne was also invited to play in the 2023 Hula Bowl.

== Professional career ==
Pre-draft measurables
Height	Weight	Arm length	Hand span	Wingspan	40-yard dash	10-yard split	20-yard split	20-yard shuttle	Three-cone drill	Vertical jump	Broad jump
6 ft 2 3/4 in (1.90 m)	209 lb (95 kg)	33 1/8 in (0.84 m)	9 3/4 in (0.25 m)	6 ft 7 5/8 in (2.02 m)	4.73 s	1.54 s	2.66 s	4.10 s	6.85 s	40.0 in (1.02 m)	10 ft 7 in (3.23 m)
All values from Pro Day

=== Houston Texans ===
After not being selected in the 2023 NFL draft, Wayne signed with the Houston Texans as an undrafted free agent. Wayne was also selected in the 2023 CFL draft by the Toronto Argonauts. He was waived on August 29, 2023, and later re-signed to the practice squad. Wayne was released on November 8 and re-signed to the practice squad on November 17. He signed a reserve/future contract on January 22, 2024.

On July 22, 2024, Wayne was waived by the Texans with an injury designation. He was re-signed to the practice squad on October 9. He was promoted to the active roster on January 15, 2025.

On August 5, 2025, Wayne was waived by the Texans, and later re-signed to the practice squad. On January 20, 2026, he signed a reserve/futures contract with Houston.

On October 12, 2026, Wayne was waived by the Texans.

=== Miami Dolphins ===
On October 13, 2026, Wayne was claimed off waivers by the Miami Dolphins.
