= Maurice Ffrench =

American football player (born 1999)

Profile
- Position: Wide receiver

Personal information
- Born: January 1, 1999 (age 27); New Brunswick, New Jersey, U.S.
- Listed height: 6 ft 0 in (1.83 m)
- Listed weight: 200 lb (91 kg)

Career information
- High school: New Brunswick (NJ)
- College: Pittsburgh
- NFL draft: 2020: undrafted

Career history
- Kansas City Chiefs (2020–2021)*; Los Angeles Chargers (2021); Edmonton Elks (2023); Ottawa Redblacks (2023–2025)*
- * Offseason or practice squad member only

Awards and highlights
- Third-team All-ACC (2019)

Career NFL statistics
- Rushing yards: 3
- Stats at Pro Football Reference
- Stats at CFL.ca

Maurice Lamont Ffrench (born January 1, 1999) is an American professional football wide receiver. He was most recently a member of the Ottawa Redblacks of the Canadian Football League (CFL). He played college football for Pittsburgh and was originally signed by the Kansas City Chiefs as an undrafted free agent in 2020. He has also been a member of the Los Angeles Chargers and Edmonton Elks.

== Early life ==
Ffrench was born on January 1, 1999, in New Brunswick, New Jersey. He attended New Brunswick High School, playing running back, wide receiver, cornerback, and returner there. He ran for 1,375 yards on 106 carries (12.9 average), caught 28 passes for 727 yards, and scored 24 total touchdowns (15 rushing, five receiving, two on kickoff returns and two by punt returns). After spending all four years of high school as team captain, Ffrench accepted a scholarship offer from University of Pittsburgh to play for their Panther football team.

As a true freshman, Ffrench appeared in nine games as a two-way player. He started the season as reserve wide receiver and later played defensive back, when multiple players were injured. He scored two touchdowns in the season, including one on a 77-yard rush against Syracuse. On defense he made two tackles, both coming against Syracuse. He played in all twelve games as a sophomore, starting five and placing third on the team in receptions (25) and receiving yards (272).

As a junior, Ffrench played in 14 games, starting six as a receiver. He totaled 10 touchdowns on rushes, receptions, and kick returns. He made a season-long 78-yard receiving touchdown against Virginia Tech. He also made a 99-yard kick return touchdown against Notre Dame. He led his conference in kick return yards and touchdowns, earning honorable mention All-ACC. Ffrench had his best season as a senior, compiling 96 receptions for 850 yards and four touchdowns, earning honorable mention All-ACC honors.

== Professional career ==
Pre-draft measurables
Height	Weight	Arm length	Hand span
5 ft 10 7/8 in (1.80 m)	197 lb (89 kg)	30 7/8 in (0.78 m)	10 1/8 in (0.26 m)
All values from Pro Day

=== Kansas City Chiefs ===
After going unselected in the 2020 NFL draft, Ffrench was signed by the Kansas City Chiefs as an undrafted free agent. He was waived at roster cuts and re-signed to the practice squad the next day. He was released again at the following year's roster cuts, being signed again to the practice squad. He was released from the practice squad on September 13, 2021.

=== Los Angeles Chargers ===
Two days after being released, Ffrench was signed by the Los Angeles Chargers. He was elevated to the active roster prior to their week nine game against the Philadelphia Eagles, in which he appeared on one play. He signed a reserve/future contract with the Chargers on January 11, 2022. Ffrench was waived by Los Angeles on August 15.

=== Edmonton Elks ===
Ffrench joined the Edmonton Elks of the Canadian Football League (CFL) for the 2023 season and appeared in four games, registering 15 receptions for 190 yards and a touchdown, before being released on July 24.

=== Ottawa Redblacks ===
Ffrench was signed to the Ottawa Redblacks' practice squad on August 2, 2023. He was placed on injured reserve on October 29.

Ffrench was released by Ottawa on April 22, 2024. He was later re-signed to the team's practice roster on August 29. Ffrench was part of the team's final training camp cuts on May 31, 2025.

== Personal life ==
Ffrench's brother is Michigan wide receiver Jaime Ffrench Jr.
