= 2021 Miami Hurricanes football team =

American college football season

2021 Miami Hurricanes football
- Conference: Atlantic Coast Conference
- Coastal Division
- Record: 7–5 (5–3 ACC)
- Head coach: Manny Diaz (3rd season)
- Offensive coordinator: Rhett Lashlee (2nd season)
- Offensive scheme: Bear raid
- Base defense: 4–3
- Home stadium: Hard Rock Stadium

Uniform
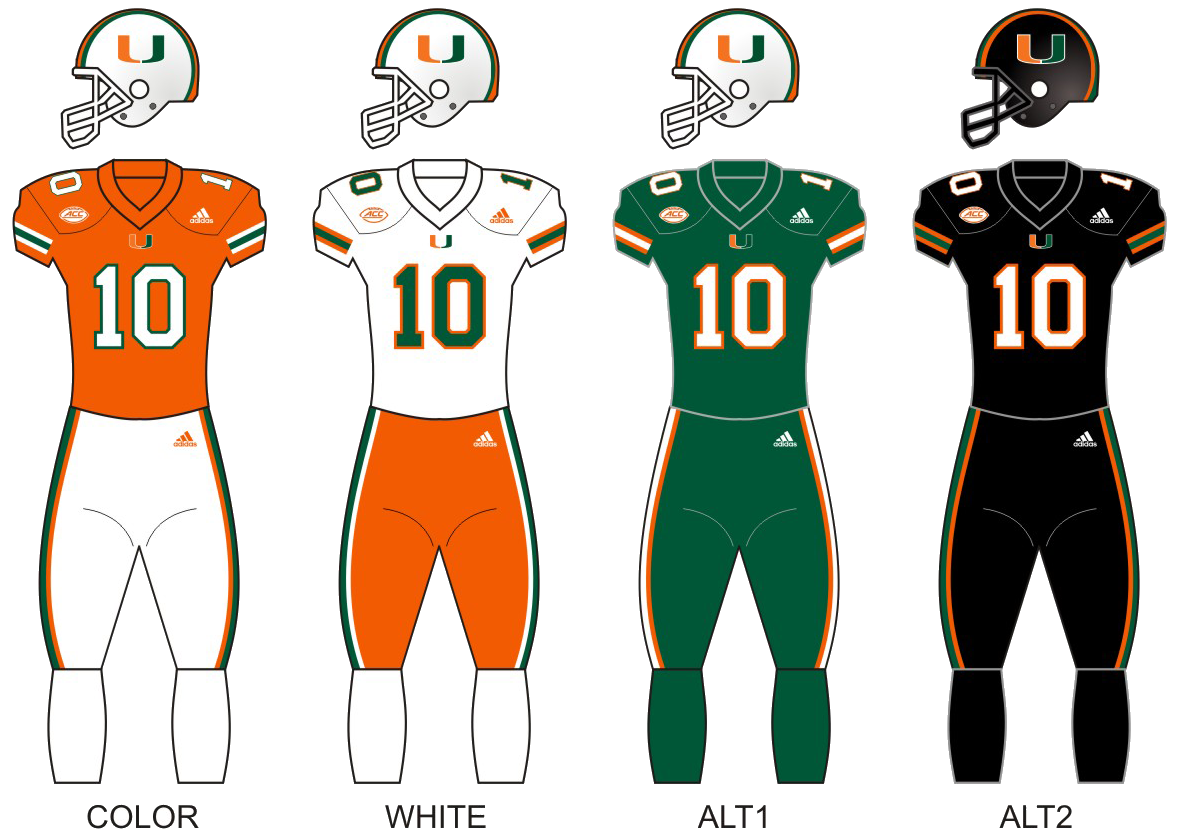

2021 Atlantic Coast Conference football standings
	Conf.			Overall
Team	W		L	W		L
Atlantic Division
No. 15 Wake Forest xy	7	–	1	11	–	3
No. 20 NC State	6	–	2	9	–	3
No. 14 Clemson	6	–	2	10	–	3
Louisville	4	–	4	6	–	7
Florida State	4	–	4	5	–	7
Boston College	2	–	6	6	–	6
Syracuse	2	–	6	5	–	7
Coastal Division
No. 13 Pittsburgh xy$	7	–	1	11	–	3
Miami (FL)	5	–	3	7	–	5
Virginia Tech	4	–	4	6	–	7
Virginia	4	–	4	6	–	6
North Carolina	3	–	5	6	–	7
Georgia Tech	2	–	6	3	–	9
Duke	0	–	8	3	–	9
Championship: Pittsburgh 45, Wake Forest 21
$ – Conference champion; x – Division champion/co-champions; y – Championship game participant; Rankings from AP Poll

The 2021 Miami Hurricanes football team (variously "Miami", "The U", "UM", "'Canes") represented the University of Miami during the 2021 NCAA Division I FBS football season. The Hurricanes were led by third-year head coach Manny Diaz, who was dismissed on December 6. They played their home games at Hard Rock Stadium, competing as a member of the Atlantic Coast Conference (ACC).

The Hurricanes finished their regular season with a 7–5 overall record and accepted a bid to play in the Sun Bowl, where they were scheduled to face the Washington State Cougars. On December 26, the Hurricanes announced their withdrawal from the bowl, due to COVID-19 issues; organizers stated that they would try to secure a replacement team to face Washington State. The following day, the Central Michigan Chippewas were named as the Sun Bowl replacement team.

== Offseason ==
=== Position key ===
Back	B	Center	C	Cornerback	CB	Defensive back	DB		
Defensive end	DE	Defensive lineman	DL	Defensive tackle	DT	End	E		
Fullback	FB	Place Kicker	PK	Guard	G	Halfback	HB	Kicker	K
Kickoff returner	KR	Offensive tackle	OT	Offensive lineman	OL	Linebacker	LB		
Long snapper	LS	Split end	SE	Punter	P	Punt returner	PR	Quarterback	QB
Running back	RB	Safety	S	Tight end	TE	Wide receiver	WR		

=== Coaching changes ===
Blake Baker former defensive coordinator for the Hurricanes, accepted a position as a linebackers coach for the LSU Tigers after Manny Diaz announced he would start taking over play calling duties for the Hurricanes.

=== Players ===
2021 Miami offseason departures
Name	Number	Pos.	Height	Weight	Year	Hometown	Notes
Jaelan Phillips	15	DL	6’5	266	RS Junior	Redlands, CA	Declared for NFL Draft
Brevin Jordan	9	TE	6’3	245	Junior	Las Vegas, NV	Declared for NFL Draft
Quincy Roche	2	DL	5’10	206	Junior	Randallstown, MD	Declared for NFL Draft
José Borregales	30	PK	5'10	205	RS Senior	Miami, FL	Graduated

==== Transfers ====
Outgoing

The Miami Hurricanes lost six players via transfer from the 2020 season.

Name	No.	Pos.	Height	Weight	Hometown	Year	New school
Christian Williams	#4	CB	6’1	186	Daphne, AL	Sophomore	USF
Patrick Joyner	#52	LB	6’2	223	Homestead, FL	(redshirt) Freshmen	Utah State
Tate Martell	#18	QB	5’11	193	Las Vegas, NV	(redshirt) Sophomore	UNLV
Robert Burns	#4	HB	5’11	219	Miami, FL	(redshirt) Sophomore	Connecticut

=== 2021 NFL draft ===
The following Hurricanes players were selected in the 2021 NFL Draft.

Round	Pick	Player	Position	NFL team
1	18	Jaelan Phillips	DE	Miami Dolphins
1	30	Gregory Rousseau	DE	Buffalo Bills
5	147	Brevin Jordan	TE	Houston Texans
6	216	Quincy Roche	LB	Pittsburgh Steelers

== Preseason ==
=== Award Watch Lists ===
Award	Player	Position	Year
Heisman Trophy	D'Eriq King	QB	RS Sr.
Maxwell Award	D'Eriq King	QB	RS Sr.
Chuck Bednarik Award	D'Eriq King	QB	RS Sr.
Chuck Bednarik Award	Bubba Bolden	S	RS Jr.
Biletnikoff Award	Mike Harley Jr.	WR	Sr.
Bronko Nagurski Award	Bubba Bolden	S	RS Jr.

== Roster ==
2021 Miami Hurricanes football team roster
Players
Coaches
Offense

Pos.	#	Name	Class
WR	0	Romello Brinson	Fr
QB	1	D'Eriq King	Sr
RB	2	Donald Chaney Jr.	Fr
WR	3	Mike Harley Jr.	Sr
RB	4	Jaylan Knighton	So
WR	5	Key'Shawn Smith	So
WR	7	Xavier Restrepo	So
QB	9	Tyler Van Dyke	So
WR	11	Charleston Rambo	Jr
WR	12	Brashard Smith	So
QB	13	Jake Garcia	Fr
WR	15	Jacolby George	So
QB	16	Ryan Rizk	So
QB	17	Peyton Matocha	So
TE	18	Larry Hodges	Fr
WR	19	Dazalin Warshom	Fr
RB	22	Thaddeus Franklin Jr.	So
RB	23	Cam'Ron Harris	Jr
RB	24	Cody Brown	So
WR	31	Connor Byrne	Jr
FB	37	Michael Parrott	Jr
WR	40	Will Huggins	So
WR	7	Brian Hightower	Fr
WR	40	Will Huggins	Fr
RB	43	Isaiah Cashwell	Jr
WR	46	Devon Perry	Sr
WR	47	Mykel Tubbs	So
TE	48	Robert Prosek	So
OL	50	Laurence Seymour	Fr
OL	51	D. J. Scaife Jr.	Sr
OL	52	Cleveland Reed Jr.	Jr
OL	53	Jakai Clark	So
OL	54	Isaiah Walker Jr.	Fr
OL	55	Navauaghn Donaldson	Sr
OL	60	Zion Nelson	Jr
OL	62	Jarrid Williams	Sr
OL	64	Jalen Rivers	Fr
OL	65	Corey Gaynor	Jr
OL	66	Ousman Traore	Jr
OL	67	Gavin Adams	Fr
OL	68	Michael Scibelli	So
OL	70	Justice Oluwaseun	Sr
OL	71	Jared Griffith	So
OL	72	Chris Washington	Fr
OL	74	John Campbell Jr.	So
OL	75	Zalon'tae Hillery	Jr
OL	76	Ryan Rodriguez	Fr
OL	79	Michael McLaughlin	Fr
TE	80	Elijah Arroyo	So
TE	81	Kahlil Brantley	Fr
WR	83	Michael Redding III	Fr
TE	85	Will Mallory	Sr
TE	86	Dominic Mammarelli	Fr
WR	88	Dante Johnson	Sr

Defense

Pos.	#	Name	Class
S	0	James Williams	Fr
DL	1	Nesta Jade Silvera	Jr
CB	2	Tyrique Stevenson	Jr
DB	3	Gilbert Frierson	Jr
LB	4	Keontra Smith	Jr
S	5	Amari Carter	Sr
LB	6	Sam Brooks Jr.	So
CB	7	Al Blades Jr.	Jr
CB	8	D. J. Ivey	Sr
LB	9	Avery Huff	So
LB	11	Corey Flagg Jr.	So
DL	12	Jahfari Harvey	So
DE	13	Deandre Johnson	Sr
S	15	Avantae Williams	So
CB	16	Malik Curtis	So
LB	17	Waynmon Steed Jr.	Sr
LB	18	Tirek Austin-Cave	So
S	20	Jalen Harrell	So
S	21	Bubba Bolden	Jr
CB	23	Te'Corey Couch	Jr
S	24	Kamren Kinchens	So
S	25	Keshawn Washington	Fr
S	27	Brian Balom	Fr
CB	28	Marcus Clarke	So
CB	29	Isaiah Dunson	So
DL	33	Chantz Williams	So
LB	34	Ryan Ragone	Jr
LB	35	Zac Smith	Fr
LB	38	Shawn Sawyer	Fr
CB	40	Luis Gutierrez Jr.	So
LB	41	Chase Smith	So
DL	45	Bryan Levine	So
LB	48	Jake Hoffman	So
LB	51	Tyler Johnson	So
DL	53	Zach McCloud	Sr
DL	56	Leonard Taylor III	Fr
DL	69	Sam Fishman	Fr
DL	81	Jared Harrison-Hunte	So
DL	84	Josh Neely	So
DL	91	Jordan Miller	Jr
DE	93	Jabari Ishmael	Fr
DE	95	Thomas Davis	Fr
DL	96	Jonathan Ford	Sr
DL	97	Allan Haye Jr.	Fr
DL	99	Elijah Roberts	So

Special teams

Pos.	#	Name	Class
K	30	Andrés Borregales	So
P	32	Nelson Foley	So
K	45	Camden Price	So
LS	49	Mason Napper	Fr
LS	58	Clay James	Jr
LS	59	Alan Nadelsticher	Fr
K/P	85	Sebastian Przytula	Fr
P	86	Fred Potter	Fr
P	87	Matias Gasc	Sr
P	94	Lou Hedley	Sr

Head coach

- Manny Diaz

Coordinators/assistant coaches

- Rhett Lashlee (OC)
- Jonathan Brewer (OQC)

Legend

- (C) Team captain
- (S) Suspended
- (I) Ineligible
- Injured
- Redshirt

== Schedule ==
Date	Time	Opponent	Rank	Site	TV	Result	Attendance
September 4	3:30 p.m.	vs. No. 1 Alabama*	No. 14	Mercedes-Benz Stadium; Atlanta, GA (Chick-fil-A Kickoff Game / SEC Nation)	ABC	L 13–44	71,829
September 11	7:00 p.m.	Appalachian State*	No. 22	Hard Rock Stadium; Miami Gardens, FL	ESPNU	W 25–23	45,877
September 18	12:00 p.m.	Michigan State*	No. 24	Hard Rock Stadium; Miami Gardens, FL	ABC	L 17–38	46,427
September 25	12:30 p.m.	Central Connecticut*		Hard Rock Stadium; Miami Gardens, FL	ACCRSN	W 69–0	44,019
September 30	7:30 p.m.	Virginia		Hard Rock Stadium; Miami Gardens, FL	ESPN	L 28–30	37,269
October 16	3:30 p.m.	at North Carolina		Kenan Memorial Stadium; Chapel Hill, NC	ACCN	L 42–45	50,500
October 23	7:30 p.m.	No. 18 NC State		Hard Rock Stadium; Miami Gardens, FL	ESPN2	W 31–30	43,293
October 30	12:00 p.m.	at No. 17 Pittsburgh		Heinz Field; Pittsburgh, PA	ACCN	W 38–34	46,977
November 6	12:30 p.m.	Georgia Tech		Hard Rock Stadium; Miami Gardens, FL	ACCRSN	W 33–30	48,161
November 13	3:30 p.m.	at Florida State		Doak Campbell Stadium; Tallahassee, FL (rivalry)	ESPN	L 28–31	71,917
November 20	7:30 p.m.	Virginia Tech		Hard Rock Stadium; Miami Gardens, FL (rivalry)	ACCN	W 38–26	40,839
November 27	12:30 p.m.	at Duke		Wallace Wade Stadium; Durham, NC	ACCRSN	W 47–10	17,391
*Non-conference game; Rankings from AP Poll released prior to the game; All times are in Eastern time

== Game summaries ==
=== Vs. No. 1 Alabama (Chick-fil-A Kickoff Game) ===
No. 1 Alabama Crimson Tide vs. No. 14 Miami Hurricanes

Quarter	1	2	3	4	Total
No. 1 Crimson Tide	10	17	14	3	44
No. 14 Hurricanes	0	3	10	0	13

at Mercedes-Benz Stadium • Atlanta, GA

- Date: September 4
- Game time: 3:30 p.m.
- Game weather: None (retractable roof closed)
- Game attendance: 71,829
- TV announcers (ABC): Sean McDonough (play-by-play), Todd Blackledge (color), Todd McShay and Molly McGrath (sideline)

Game information
First quarter
- ALA – John Metchie III 37-yard pass from Bryce Young (Will Reichard kick), 12:07. Crimson Tide 7–0. Drive: 7 plays, 75 yards, 2:53.
- ALA – Will Reichard 38-yard field goal, 4:39. Crimson Tide 10–0. Drive: 11 plays, 55 yards, 5:05.

Second quarter

- ALA – Cameron Latu 9-yard pass from Bryce Young (Will Reichard kick), 14:12. Crimson Tide 17–0. Drive: 10 plays, 80 yards, 3:32.
- ALA – Will Reichard 51-yard field goal, 11:33. Crimson Tide 20–0. Drive: 4 plays, 0 yards, 2:16.
- ALA – Cameron Latu 25-yard pass from Bryce Young (Will Reichard kick), 6:55. Crimson Tide 27–0. Drive: 7 plays, 74 yards, 2:31.
- MIA – Andrés Borregales 37-yard field goal, 0:00. Crimson Tide 27–3. Drive: 11 plays, 60 yards, 1:57.

Third quarter

- ALA – Jameson Williams 94-yard pass from Bryce Young (Will Reichard kick), 9:29. Crimson Tide 34–3. Drive: 3 plays, 99 yards, 0:50.
- ALA – Trey Sanders 20-yard run (Will Reichard kick), 7:01. Crimson Tide 41–3. Drive: 5 plays, 45 yards, 2:16.
- MIA – Xavier Restrepo 29-yard pass from D'Eriq King (Andrés Borregales kick), 5:18. Crimson Tide 41–10. Drive: 7 plays, 75 yards, 1:43.
- MIA – Andrés Borregales 28-yard field goal, 0:30. Crimson Tide 41–13. Drive: 8 plays, 14 yards, 2:49.

Fourth quarter

- ALA – Will Reichard 40-yard field goal, 7:52. Crimson Tide 44–13. Drive: 13 plays, 53 yards, 7:38.

Statistics	ALA	MIA
First downs	28	17
Plays–yards	77–510	64–266
Rushes–yards	38–156	31–87
Passing yards	354	179
Passing: comp–att–int	28–39–0	23–33–2
Turnovers		
Time of possession	37:02	22:58

Team	Category	Player	Statistics
Alabama	Passing	Bryce Young	27/38, 344 yards, 4 TD
Alabama	Rushing	Brian Robinson Jr.	12 carries, 60 yards
Alabama	Receiving	Jameson Williams	4 receptions, 126 yards, TD
Miami	Passing	D'Eriq King	23/30, 179 yards, TD, 2 INT
Miami	Rushing	Cam'Ron Harris	12 carries, 37 yards
Miami	Receiving	Xavier Restrepo	3 receptions, 55 yards, TD

=== Appalachian State ===
Game Two – Appalachian State (1–0) at No. 22 Miami Hurricanes (0–1)

Quarter	1	2	3	4	Total
Mountaineers	7	7	3	6	23
No. 22 Hurricanes	9	3	7	6	25

at Hard Rock Stadium • Miami Gardens, Florida

- Date: Saturday, September 11, 2021
- Game time: 7:00 p.m. EDT
- Game weather: Sunny • Temperature: 87 °F (31 °C) •
- Referee: Kyle Olsen
- TV announcers (ESPNU): Clay Matvick (play-by-play), Rocky Boiman (analyst), Tiffany Blackman (sideline)

Game information

First quarter

- (9:09) MIA – Donald Chaney Jr. 1-yard run, Andrés Borregales kick (Drive: 3 plays, 6 yards, 0:49; Miami 7–0)
- (5:20) APP – Camerun Peoples 28-yard run, Chandler Staton kick (Drive: 9 plays, 69 yards, 3:49; Tie 7–7)
- (2:50) MIA – Team Safety (Drive: 7 plays, −9 yards, 2:50; Miami 7–9)

Second quarter

- (6:19) MIA – Andrés Borregales 27-yard field goal (Drive: 12 plays, 76 yards, 4:12; Miami 12–7)
- (6:07) APP – Jalen Virgil 100-Yard Kickoff Return (Drive: 0 plays, 0 yards, 0:13; Appalachian State 14–12)

Third quarter

- (13:32) MIA – Cam'Ron Harris 12-yard run, Andrés Borregales kick (Drive: 5 plays, 75 yards, 1:28; Miami 19–14)
- (9:21) APP – Chandler Staton 22-yard field goal (Drive: 11 plays, 70 yards, 4:11; Miami 19–17)

Fourth quarter

- (9:15) MIA – Andrés Borregales 38-yard field goal (Drive: 5 plays, 12 yards, 2:05; Miami 22–17)
- (5:48) APP – Malik Williams 3-yard pass from Chase Brice, 2 Point Conversion Fail (Drive: 8 plays, 75 yards, 3:27; Appalachian State 23–22)
- (2:04) MIA – Andrés Borregales 43-yard field goal (Drive: 10 plays, 55 yards, 3:44; Miami 25–23)

Statistics	APP	MIA
First downs	19	25
Plays–yards	74–326	80–367
Rushes–yards	41–130	44–167
Passing yards	199	200
Passing: comp–att–int	21–34–1	20–33–0
Turnovers		
Time of possession	32:12	27:48

Team	Category	Player	Statistics
Appalachian State	Passing	Chase Brice	21/34, 199 yards, TD, INT
Appalachian State	Rushing	Camerun Peoples	17 carries, 95 yards, TD
Appalachian State	Receiving	Corey Sutton	7 receptions, 60 yards
Miami	Passing	D'Eriq King	20/33, 200 yards
Miami	Rushing	Cam'Ron Harris	18 carries, 91 yards, TD
Miami	Receiving	Key'Shawn Smith	4 receptions, 70 yards

=== Michigan State ===
Game Three – Michigan State Spartans (2–0) at No. 24 Miami Hurricanes (1–1)

Quarter	1	2	3	4	Total
Spartans	0	10	7	21	38
No. 24 Hurricanes	0	7	7	3	17

at Hard Rock Stadium • Miami Gardens, Florida

- Date: Saturday, September 18, 2021
- Game time: 12:00 p.m. EDT
- Game weather: Sunny • Temperature: 88 °F (31 °C) •
- Game attendance: 46,427
- Referee: Jerry McGinn
- TV announcers (ABC): Joe Tessitore (play-by-play), Greg McElroy (analyst), Katie George (sideline)

Game information

First quarter

- No scoring plays.

Second quarter

- (13:58) MSU – Matt Coghlin 23-yard field goal (Drive: 12 plays, 73 yards, 4:41; Michigan State 3–0)
- (10:08) MIA – Charleston Rambo 3-yard pass from D'Eriq King, (Andrés Borregales kick) (Drive: 10 plays, 75 yards, 3:50; Miami 7–3)
- (2:56) MSU – Kenneth Walker III 7-yard pass from Payton Thorne, (Matt Coghlin kick) (Drive: 9 plays, 80 yards, 3:14; Michigan State 10–7)

Third quarter

- (6:08) MSU – Jalen Nailor 11-yard pass from Payton Thorne, (Matt Coghlin kick) (Drive: 10 plays, 85 yards, 3:59; Michigan State 17–7)
- (3:53) MIA – Charleston Rambo 14-yard pass from D'Eriq King, (Andrés Borregales kick) (Drive: 10 plays, 75 yards, 2:15; Michigan State 17–14)

Fourth quarter

- (13:10) MSU – Jayden Reed 10-yard pass from Payton Thorne, (Matt Coghlin kick) (Drive: 3 plays, 13 yards, 1:27; Michigan State 24–14)
- (8:11) MIA – Andrés Borregales 55-yard field goal (Drive: 11 plays, 38 yards, 4:59; Michigan State 24–17)
- (4:12) MSU – Jalen Nailor 39-yard pass from Payton Thorne, (Matt Coghlin kick) (Drive: 8 plays, 75 yards, 3:59; Michigan State 31–17)
- (2:32) MSU – Jayden Reed 8-yard run, (Matt Coghlin kick) (Drive: 4 plays, 23 yards, 1:07; Michigan State 38–17)

Statistics	MSU	MIA
First downs	23	29
Plays–yards	72–454	84–440
Rushes–yards	41–193	24–52
Passing yards	261	388
Passing: comp–att–int	18–31–0	38–60–2
Turnovers		
Time of possession	31:15	28:45

Team	Category	Player	Statistics
Michigan State	Passing	Payton Thorne	18/31, 261 yards, 4 TD
Michigan State	Rushing	Kenneth Walker III	27 carries, 182 yards
Michigan State	Receiving	Jalen Nailor	4 receptions, 82 yards, 2 TD
Miami	Passing	D'Eriq King	38/59, 388 yards, 2 TD, 2 INT
Miami	Rushing	Cam'Ron Harris	11 carries, 44 yards
Miami	Receiving	Charleston Rambo	12 receptions, 156 yards, 2 TD

=== Central Connecticut ===
Game Four – Central Connecticut Blue Devils (1–2) at Miami Hurricanes (1–2)

Quarter	1	2	3	4	Total
Blue Devils	0	0	0	0	0
Hurricanes	21	28	13	7	69

at Hard Rock Stadium • Miami Gardens, Florida

- Date: Saturday, September 25, 2021
- Game time: 12:30 p.m. EDT
- Game weather: Sunny • Temperature: 87 °F (31 °C) •
- Game attendance: 44,019
- Referee: Jerry Magallanes
- TV announcers (ACCRSN): Tom Werme (play-by-play), Charles Arbuckle (analyst)

Game information

First quarter

- (12:18) MIA – Mike Harley Jr. 5-yard pass from Tyler Van Dyke, (Andrés Borregales kick) (Drive: 7 plays, 64 yards, 2:02; Miami 7–0)
- (10:56) MIA – Brashard Smith 75-yard pass from Tyler Van Dyke, (Andrés Borregales kick) (Drive: 1 plays, 75 yards, 0:14; Miami 14–0)
- (4:40) MIA – Cody Brown 16-yard run (Andrés Borregales kick) (Drive: 8 plays, 57 yards, 2:19; Miami 21–0)

Second quarter

- (14:10) MIA – Cam'Ron Harris 51-yard run (Andrés Borregales kick) (Drive: 8 plays, 81 yards, 2:28; Miami 28–0)
- (8:01) MIA – Cody Brown 1-yard run (Andrés Borregales kick) (Drive: 4 plays, 62 yards, 1:13; Miami 35–0)
- (3:28) MIA – Cam'Ron Harris 2-yard run (Andrés Borregales kick) (Drive: 7 plays, 82 yards, 2:03; Miami 42–0)
- (1:26) MIA – Cam'Ron Harris 83-yard pass from Tyler Van Dyke, (Andrés Borregales kick) (Drive: 1 plays, 83 yards, 0:14; Miami 49–0)

Third quarter

- (5:35) MIA – Romello Brison 17-yard pass from Jake Garcia, (Camden Price kick) (Drive: 6 plays, 59 yards, 2:12; Miami 56–0)
- (2:01) MIA – Jacolby George 44-yard pass from Jake Garcia, (kick failed) (Drive: 3 plays, 54 yards, 1:06; Miami 62–0)

Fourth quarter

- (14:34) MIA – Thaddius Franklin Jr. 31-yard run (Camden Price kick) (Drive: 3 plays, 66 yards, 0:45; Miami 69–0)

Statistics	CCSU	MIA
First downs	11	31
Plays–yards	63–198	70–739
Rushes–yards	27–29	45–322
Passing yards	169	417
Passing: comp–att–int	19–37–1	21–25–0
Turnovers		
Time of possession	33:01	26:59

Team	Category	Player	Statistics
Central Connecticut	Passing	Romelo Williams	15/28, 132 yards, INT
Central Connecticut	Rushing	Nasir Smith	12 carries, 22 yards
Central Connecticut	Receiving	Tyshaun James	4 receptions, 49 yards
Miami	Passing	Tyler Van Dyke	10/11, 270 yards, 3 TD
Miami	Rushing	Cam'Ron Harris	10 carries, 100 yards, 2 TD
Miami	Receiving	Brashard Smith	5 receptions, 91 yards, TD

=== Virginia ===
Game Five – Virginia Cavaliers (2–2) at Miami Hurricanes (2–2)

Quarter	1	2	3	4	Total
Cavaliers	9	7	11	3	30
Hurricanes	0	7	14	7	28

at Hard Rock Stadium • Miami Gardens, Florida

- Date: Thursday, September 30, 2021
- Game time: 7:30 p.m. EDT
- Game weather: Partly Cloudy • Temperature: 82 °F (28 °C) •
- Game attendance: 37,269
- TV announcers (ESPN): Matt Barrie (play-by-play), Roddy Jones (analyst), Harry Lyles Jr. (sideline)

Game information

First quarter

- (7:21) UVA – Wayne Taulapapa 1-yard run (Branden Farrell kick) (Drive: 11 plays, 80 yards, 3:54; Virginia 7–0)
- (1:10) UVA – Manny Alonso tackles Cam'Ron Harris in end zone for safety (Virginia 9–0)

Second quarter

- (2:30) MIA – Cam'Ron Harris 1-yard run (Andrés Borregales kick) (Drive: 5 plays, 54 yards, 1:39; Virginia 9–7)
- (0:50) UVA – Mike Hollins 25-yard run (Branden Farrell kick) (Drive: 8 plays, 80 yards, 1:39; Virginia 16–7)

Third quarter

- (11:54) UVA – Brendan Farrell 43-yard field goal (Drive: 6 plays, 38 yards, 1:59; Virginia 19–7)
- (9:42) MIA – Mike Harley Jr. 12-yard pass from Tyler Van Dyke (Andrés Borregales kick) (Drive: 3 plays, 18 yards, 0:37; Virginia 19–14)
- (5:50) UVA – Dontayvion Wicks 36-yard pass from Brennan Armstrong, (Wayne Taulapapa 2-point run) (Drive: 11 plays, 80 yards, 3:54; Virginia 27–14)
- (1:04) MIA – Cam'Ron Harris 57-yard fun the same (Branden Farrell kick) (Drive: 11 plays, 80 yards, 3:54; Virginia 27–21)

Fourth quarter

- (12:52) UVA – Brandon Farrell 30-yard field goal (Drive: 9 plays, 62 yards, 3:12; Virginia 30–21)
- (9:09) MIA – Tyler Van Dyke 24-yard run (Andrés Borregales kick) (Drive: 9 plays, 75 yards, 3:43; Virginia 30–28)

Statistics	UVA	MIA
First downs	23	18
Plays–yards	79–449	69–372
Rushes–yards	35–181	40–169
Passing yards	268	203
Passing: comp–att–int	25–44–1	15–29–0
Turnovers		
Time of possession	34:24	25:36

Team	Category	Player	Statistics
Virginia	Passing	Brennan Armstrong	25/44, 268 yards, TD, INT
Virginia	Rushing	Wayne Taulapapa	11 carries, 63 yards, TD
Virginia	Receiving	Billy Kemp	9 receptions, 81 yards
Miami	Passing	Tyler Van Dyke	15/29, 203 yards, TD
Miami	Rushing	Cam'Ron Harris	14 carries, 112 yards, TD
Miami	Receiving	Charleston Rambo	5 receptions, 99 yards

=== North Carolina ===
Game Six – Miami Hurricanes (2–3) at North Carolina Tar Heels (3–3)

Quarter	1	2	3	4	Total
Hurricanes	10	7	17	8	42
Tar Heels	14	17	7	7	45

at Kenan Memorial Stadium • Chapel Hill, North Carolina

- Date: Saturday, October 16, 2021
- Game time: 3:30 p.m. EDT
- Game weather: Partly Cloudy • Temperature: 77 °F (25 °C) •
- Game attendance: 50,500
- Referee: Duane Heydt
- TV announcers (ACCN): Wes Durham (play-by-play), Roddy Jones (analyst)

Game information

First quarter

- (11:57) UNC – Ty Chandler 51-yard run (Grayson Atkins kick) (Drive: 7 plays, 75 yards, 3:03; North Carolina 7–0)
- (10:56) MIA – Jahfari Harvey 33-yard interception return, (Andrés Borregales kick) (Tied 7–7)
- (8:03) UNC – Josh Downs 45-yard pass from Sam Howell, (Grayson Atkins kick) (Drive: 6 plays, 75 yards, 2:53; North Carolina 14–7)
- (4:00) MIA – Andrés Borregales 44-yard field goal (Drive: 8 plays, 48 yards, 4:03; North Carolina 14–10)

Second quarter

- (10:46) UNC – John Copenhaver 2-yard pass from Sam Howell, (Grayson Atkins kick) (Drive: 13 plays, 81 yards, 6:04; North Carolina 21–10)
- (6:16) UNC – Ty Chandler 4-yard run (Grayson Atkins kick) (Drive: 7 plays, 21 yards, 3:40; North Carolina 28–10)
- (4:33) MIA – Jaylan Knighton 2-yard run (Andrés Borregales kick) (Drive: 7 plays, 75 yards, 1:43; North Carolina 28–17)
- (0:00) UNC – Grayson Atkins 48-yard field goal (Drive: 5 plays, 12 yards, 0:55; North Carolina 31–17)

Third quarter

- (10:22) MIA – Cody Brown 3-yard run (Andrés Borregales kick) (Drive: 11 plays, 75 yards, 4:38; North Carolina 31–24)
- (8:21) UNC – Sam Howell 30-yard run (Grayson Atkins kick) (Drive: 4 plays, 75 yards, 2:01; North Carolina 38–24)
- (5:56) MIA – Andrés Borregales 42-yard field goal (Drive: 10 plays, 50 yards, 2:25; North Carolina 38–27)
- (2:25) MIA – Jaylan Knighton 60-yard pass from Tyler Van Dyke, (Andrés Borregales kick) (Drive: 3 plays, 65 yards, 1:17; North Carolina 38–34)

Fourth quarter

- (9:22) UNC – Sam Howell 11-yard run (Grayson Atkins kick) (Drive: 8 plays, 58 yards, 4:20; North Carolina 45–34)
- (3:08) MIA – Jaylan Knighton 4-yard run (Charleston Rambo–Jaylan Knighton pass) (Drive: 7 plays, 75 yards, 1:43; North Carolina 45–42)

Statistics	MIA	UNC
First downs	30	22
Plays–yards	79–421	74–382
Rushes–yards	34–157	48–228
Passing yards	264	154
Passing: comp–att–int	20–45–3	17–26–1
Turnovers		
Time of possession	26:09	33:51

Team	Category	Player	Statistics
Miami	Passing	Tyler Van Dyke	20/45, 264 yards, TD, 3 INT
Miami	Rushing	Jaylan Knighton	17 carries, 92 yards, 2 TD
Miami	Receiving	Jaylan Knighton	2 receptions, 73 yards, TD
North Carolina	Passing	Sam Howell	17/26, 154 yards, 2 TD, INT
North Carolina	Rushing	Ty Chandler	18 carries, 104 yards, 2 TD
North Carolina	Receiving	Josh Downs	11 receptions, 96 yards, TD

=== No. 18 NC State ===
Game Seven – No. 18 NC State Wolfpack (5–1) at Miami Hurricanes (2–4)

Quarter	1	2	3	4	Total
No. 18 Wolfpack	3	14	3	10	30
Hurricanes	7	7	10	7	31

at Hard Rock Stadium • Miami Gardens, Florida

- Date: Saturday, October 23, 2021
- Game time: 7:30 p.m. EDT
- Game weather: Partly Cloudy • Temperature: 84 °F (29 °C) • Wind: NE 9 mph (14 km/h)
- Game attendance: 43,293
- Referee: Jerry Magallanes
- TV announcers (ESPN2): Anish Shroff (play-by-play), Mike Golic Jr. (analyst), Taylor McGregor (sideline)

Game information

First quarter

- (10:50) MIA – Charleston Rambo 25-yard pass from Tyler Van Dyke, (Andrés Borregales kick) (Drive: 8 plays, 75 yards, 2:37; Miami 7–0)
- (4:24) NCST – Christopher Dunn 33-yard field goal (Drive: 8 plays, 52 yards, 3:34; Miami 7–3)

Second quarter

- (13:41) MIA – Jaylan Knighton 53-yard pass from Tyler Van Dyke, (Andrés Borregales kick) (Drive: 6 plays, 76 yards, 2:25; Miami 14–3)
- (8:59) NCST – Thayer Thomas 7-yard pass from Devin Leary, (Christopher Dunn kick) (Drive: 10 plays, 75 yards, 4:42; Miami 14–10)
- (0:15) NCST – Thayer Thomas 27-yard pass from Devin Leary, (Christopher Dunn kick) (Drive: 3 plays, 77 yards, 0:32; NC State 17–14)

Third quarter

- (13:24) MIA – Will Mallory 5-yard pass from Tyler Van Dyke, (Andrés Borregales kick) (Drive: 5 plays, 75 yards, 1:36; Miami 21–17)
- (7:09) NCST – Christopher Dunn 44-yard field goal (Drive: 8 plays, 26 yards, 3:21; Miami 21–20)
- (3:22) MIA – Andrés Borregales 22-yard field goal (Drive: 9 plays, 70 yards, 3:47; Miami 24–20)

Fourth quarter

- (14:45) NCST – Devin Leary 17-yard run, (Christopher Dunn kick) (Drive: 7 plays, 79 yards, 3:37; NC State 27–24)
- (9:34) MIA – Charleston Rambo 4-yard pass from Tyler Van Dyke, (Andrés Borregales kick) (Drive: 10 plays, 75 yards, 5:11; Miami 31–27)
- (5:39) NCST – Christopher Dunn 40-yard field goal (Drive: 7 plays, 52 yards, 3:55; Miami 31–30)

Statistics	NCST	MIA
First downs	18	18
Plays–yards	64–421	70–415
Rushes–yards	22–111	38–95
Passing yards	310	325
Passing: comp–att–int	24–42–0	25–33–0
Turnovers		
Time of possession	28:30	31:29

Team	Category	Player	Statistics
NC State	Passing	Devin Leary	24/42, 310 yards, 2 TD
NC State	Rushing	Ricky Person Jr.	9 carries, 54 yards
NC State	Receiving	Emeka Emezie	3 receptions, 75 yards
Miami	Passing	Tyler Van Dyke	25/33, 325 yards, 4 TD
Miami	Rushing	Jaylan Knighton	21 carries, 83 yards
Miami	Receiving	Charleston Rambo	9 receptions, 127 yards, 2 TD

=== No. 17 Pittsburgh ===
Game Eight – Miami Hurricanes (3–4) at #17 Pittsburgh Panthers (6–1)

Quarter	1	2	3	4	Total
Hurricanes	21	10	7	0	38
No. 17 Panthers	10	7	14	3	34

at Heinz Field • Pittsburgh, Pennsylvania

- Date: Saturday, October 30, 2021
- Game time: 12:00 p.m. EDT
- Game weather: Rainy • Temperature: 58 °F (14 °C) •
- Game attendance: 46,977
- Referee: Jeff Heaser
- TV announcers (ACCN): Chris Cotter (play-by-play), Mark Herzlich (analyst), Jalyn Johnson (sideline)

Game information

First quarter

- (12:09) PITT – Israel Abanikanda 4-yard run, (Sam Scarton kick) (Drive: 8 plays, 75 yards, 2:51; Pittsburgh 7–0)
- (10:31) MIA – Elijah Arroyo 20-yard pass from Tyler Van Dyke, (Andrés Borregales kick) (Drive: 5 plays, 75 yards, 1:38; Tied 7–7)
- (8:44) MIA – Will Mallory 57-yard pass from Tyler Van Dyke, (Andrés Borregales kick) (Drive: 3 plays, 55 yards, 0:44; Miami 14–7)
- (6:20) MIA – Jaylan Knighton 40-yard run, (Andrés Borregales kick) (Drive: 2 plays, 60 yards, 0:34; Miami 21–7)
- (3:35) PITT – Sam Scarton 38-yard field goal (Drive: 9 plays, 55 yards, 2:55; Miami 21–10)

Second quarter

- (12:50) PITT – Israel Abanikanda 20-yard pass from Kenny Pickett, (Sam Scarton kick) (Drive: 7 plays, 84 yards, 2:17; Miami 21–17)
- (10:16) MIA – Andrés Borregales 26-yard field goal (Drive: 9 plays, 72 yards, 2:28; Miami 24–17)
- (4:02) MIA Jaylan Knighton 1-yard run, (Andrés Borregales kick) (Drive: 4 plays, 37 yards, 1:35; Miami 31–17)

Third quarter

- (11:18) PITT – Jared Wayne 12-yard pass from Kenny Pickett, (Sam Scarton kick) (Drive: 5 plays, 27 yards, 1:35; Miami 31–24)
- (5:50) PITT – Jaylon Barden 20-yard pass from Kenny Pickett, (Sam Scarton kick) (Drive: 6 plays, 91 yards, 2:53; Tied 31–31)
- (2:15) MIA – Key'Shawn Smith 13-yard pass from Tyler Van Dyke, (Andrés Borregales kick) (Drive: 8 plays, 85 yards, 3:28; Miami 38–31)

Fourth quarter

- (13:55) PITT – Sam Scarton 23-yard field goal (Drive: 11 plays, 50 yards, 3:12; Miami 38–34)

Statistics	MIA	PITT
First downs	27	32
Plays–yards	71–492	79–587
Rushes–yards	26–71	23–68
Passing yards	428	519
Passing: comp–att–int	32–42–1	39–56–2
Turnovers		
Time of possession	29:55	28:18

Team	Category	Player	Statistics
Miami	Passing	Tyler Van Dyke	32/42, 428 yards, 3 TD, INT
Miami	Rushing	Jaylan Knighton	17 carries, 80 yards, TD
Miami	Receiving	Charleston Rambo	7 receptions, 101 yards
Pittsburgh	Passing	Kenny Pickett	39/55, 519 yards, 3 TD, 2 INT
Pittsburgh	Rushing	Vincent Davis	6 carries, 45 yards
Pittsburgh	Receiving	Jordan Addison	8 receptions, 145 yards

=== Georgia Tech ===
Game Nine – Georgia Tech Yellow Jackets (3–5) at Miami Hurricanes (4–4)

Quarter	1	2	3	4	Total
Yellow Jackets	7	14	7	2	30
Hurricanes	14	3	7	9	33

at Hard Rock Stadium • Miami Gardens, Florida

- Date: Saturday, November 6, 2021
- Game time: 12:30 p.m. EDT
- Game weather: Rainy • Temperature: 81 °F (27 °C) •
- Game attendance: 48,161
- Referee: Gary Patterson
- TV announcers (ACCRSN): Tom Werme (play-by-play), James Bates (analyst)

Game information

First quarter

- (9:10) MIA – Mike Harley Jr. 8-yard pass from Tyler Van Dyke, (Andrés Borregales kick) (Drive: 11 plays, 93 yards, 3:39; Miami 7–0)
- (7:14) MIA – Charleston Rambo 35-yard pass from Tyler Van Dyke, (Andrés Borregales kick) (Drive: 4 plays, 58 yards, 0:58; Miami 14–0)
- (4:21) GT – Jordan Mason 71-yard run, (Brent Cimaglia kick) (Drive: 6 plays, 93 yards, 2:53; Miami 14–7)

Second quarter

- (13:22) GT – Jahmyr Gibbs 29-yard run, (Brent Cimaglia kick) (Drive: 7 plays, 86 yards, 2:57; Tied 14–14)
- (9:48) MIA – Andrés Borregales 28-yard field goal (Drive: 5 plays, 43 yards, 0:57; Miami 17–14)
- (7:56) GT – Jaylon King 40-yard fumble return, (Brent Cimaglia kick) (Georgia Tech 21–17)

Third quarter

- (13:59) MIA – Jaylan Knighton 2-yard run, (Andrés Borregales kick) (Drive: 4 plays, 75 yards, 1:01; Miami 24–21)
- (13:59) GT – Jahmyr Gibbs 50-yard pass from Jeff Sims, (Brent Cimaglia kick) (Drive: 7 plays, 73 yards, 3:26; Georgia Tech 28–24)

Fourth quarter

- (13:20) MIA – Andrés Borregales 31-yard field goal (Drive: 12 plays, 53 yards, 5:05; Georgia Tech 28–27)
- (10:27) MIA – Key'Shawn Smith 15-yard pass from Tyler Van Dyke, (Two-point pass failed) (Drive: 5 plays, 51 yards, 1:50; Miami 33–28)
- (10:27) GT – Juanyeh Thomas 100-yard interception return for safety (Miami 33–30)

Statistics	GT	MIA
First downs	15	24
Plays–yards	71–329	76–563
Rushes–yards	32–135	41–175
Passing yards	194	389
Passing: comp–att–int	21–38–1	22–34–0
Turnovers		
Time of possession	34:13	25:47

Team	Category	Player	Statistics
Georgia Tech	Passing	Jeff Sims	21/38, 194 yards, TD, INT
Georgia Tech	Rushing	Jordan Mason	8 carries, 75 yards, TD
Georgia Tech	Receiving	Jahmyr Gibbs	4 receptions, 72 yards, TD
Miami	Passing	Tyler Van Dyke	22/34, 389 yards, 3 TD
Miami	Rushing	Jaylan Knighton	32 carries, 162 yards, TD
Miami	Receiving	Charleston Rambo	7 receptions, 210 yards, TD

=== Florida State ===
Game Ten – Miami Hurricanes (5–4) at Florida State Seminoles (3–6)

Quarter	1	2	3	4	Total
Hurricanes	0	7	7	14	28
Seminoles	14	6	0	11	31

at Doak Campbell Stadium • Tallahassee, Florida

- Date: Saturday, November 13, 2021
- Game time: 12:30 p.m. EDT
- Game weather: Sunny • Temperature: 68 °F (20 °C) •
- Game attendance: 71,917
- TV announcers (ESPN): Mark Jones (play-by-play), Robert Griffin III (analyst), Quint Kessenich (sideline)

Game information

First quarter

- (9:50) FSU – Jordan Travis 2-yard run, (Ryan Fitzgerald kick) (Drive: 7 plays, 78 yards, 4:03; Florida State 7–0)
- (1:05) FSU – Jashaun Corbin 12-yard run, (Ryan Fitzgerald kick) (Drive: 1 plays, 12 yards, 0:06; Florida State 14–0)

Second quarter

- (12:44) FSU – Ryan Fitzgerald 22-yard field goal (Drive: 7 plays, 55 yards, 2:23; Florida State 17–0)
- (3:35) MIA – KeyShawn Smith 5-yard pass from Tyler Van Dyke (Andrés Borregales kick) (Drive: 6 plays, 66 yards, 2:19; Florida State 17–7)
- (0:00) FSU – Ryan Fitzgerald 27-yard field goal (Drive: 9 plays, 66 yards, 3:35; Florida State 20–7)

Third quarter

- (8:07) MIA – Mike Harley Jr. 10-yard pass from Tyler Van Dyke, (Andrés Borregales kick) (Drive: 7 plays, 38 yards, 1:44; Florida State 20–14)

Fourth quarter

- (14:56) MIA – Will Mallory 10-yard pass from Tyler Van Dyke, (Andrés Borregales kick) (Drive: 11 plays, 97 yards, 3:57; Miami 21–20)
- (11:04) MIA – Jaylan Knighton 35-yard pass from Tyler Van Dyke, (Andrés Borregales kick) (Drive: 6 plays, 73 yards, 2:53; Miami 28–20)
- (4:43) FSU – Ryan Fitzgerald 29-yard field goal (Drive: 14 plays, 64 yards, 6:21; Miami 28–23)
- (0:26) FSU – Jordan Travis 1-yard run, (Jordan Travis 2-point run) (Drive: 14 plays, 64 yards, 6:21; Florida State 31–28)

Statistics	MIA	FSU
First downs	20	24
Plays–yards	70–359	74–434
Rushes–yards	23–43	48–160
Passing yards	316	274
Passing: comp–att–int	25–47–2	18–26–0
Turnovers		
Time of possession	23:51	36:09

Team	Category	Player	Statistics
Miami	Passing	Tyler Van Dyke	25/47, 316 yards, 4 TD, 2 INT
Miami	Rushing	Jaylan Knighton	16 carries, 32 yards
Miami	Receiving	Charleston Rambo	6 receptions, 95 yards
Florida State	Passing	Jordan Travis	18/26, 274 yards
Florida State	Rushing	Jashaun Corbin	15 carries, 68 yards, TD
Florida State	Receiving	Jakhi Douglas	4 receptions, 90 yards

=== Virginia Tech ===
Game Eleven – Virginia Tech Hokies (5–5) at Miami Hurricanes (5–5)

Quarter	1	2	3	4	Total
Hokies	3	10	13	0	26
Hurricanes	14	14	3	7	38

at Hard Rock Stadium • Miami Gardens, Florida

- Date: Saturday, November 20, 2021
- Game time: 7:30 p.m. EDT
- Game weather: Showers • Temperature: 77 °F (25 °C) •
- Game attendance: 40,839
- Referee: Duane Heydt
- TV announcers (ACCN): Wes Durham (play-by-play), Roddy Jones (analyst), Taylor Davis (sideline)

Game information

First quarter

- (11:26) MIA – Will Mallory 4-yard pass from Tyler Van Dyke, (Andrés Borregales kick) (Drive: 4 plays, 55 yards, 1:45; Miami 7–0)
- (5:06) VT – John Parker Romo 25-yard field goal (Drive: 11 plays, 72 yards, 6:20; Miami 7–3)
- (2:42) MIA – Jaylan Knighton 1-yard run, (Andrés Borregales kick) (Drive: 8 plays, 50 yards, 2:24; Miami 14–3)

Second quarter

- (11:35) MIA – Jaylan Knighton 3-yard run, (Andrés Borregales kick) (Drive: 7 plays, 80 yards, 3:25; Miami 21–3)
- (7:43) VT – Tre Turner 6-yard pass from Braxton Burmeister, (John Parker Romo kick) (Drive: 11 plays, 75 yards, 3:52; Miami 21–10)
- (7:33) MIA – Brashard Smith 75-yard pass from Tyler Van Dyke, (Andrés Borregales kick) (Drive: 1 plays, 75 yards, 0:10; Miami 28–10)
- (3:33) VT – John Parker Romo 36-yard field goal (Drive: 9 plays, 56 yards, 4:00; Miami 28–13)

Third quarter

- (9:56) MIA – Andrés Borregales 30-yard field goal (Drive: 4 plays, 7 yards, 1:51; Miami 31–13)
- (6:25) VT – Kaleb Smith 7-yard pass from Connor Blumrick (John Parker Romo kick) (Drive: 6 plays, 75 yards, 3:31; Miami 31–20)
- (2:12) VT – D'Wain Lofton 4-yard pass from Connor Blumrick (2-point pass failed) (Drive: 7 plays, 41 yards, 4:09; Miami 31–26)

Fourth quarter

- (10:39) MIA – Mike Harley Jr. 55-yard pass from Tyler Van Dyke (Andrés Borregales kick) (Drive: 4 plays, 68 yards, 1:39; Miami 38–26)

Statistics	VT	MIA
First downs	18	22
Plays–yards	71–375	63–411
Rushes–yards	43–227	28–63
Passing yards	148	357
Passing: comp–att–int	19–28–0	19–33–0
Turnovers		
Time of possession	33:42	26:18

Team	Category	Player	Statistics
Virginia Tech	Passing	Braxton Burmeister	14/17, 109 yards, TD
Virginia Tech	Rushing	Connor Blumrick	20 carries, 132 yards
Virginia Tech	Receiving	Tré Turner	5 receptions, 44 yards, TD
Miami	Passing	Tyler Van Dyke	19/33, 357 yards, 3 TD
Miami	Rushing	Thaddius Franklin Jr.	9 carries, 36 yards
Miami	Receiving	Charleston Rambo	7 receptions, 116 yards

=== Duke ===
Game Twelve – Miami Hurricanes (6–5) at Duke Blue Devils (3–8)

Quarter	1	2	3	4	Total
Hurricanes	10	20	17	0	47
Blue Devils	10	0	0	0	10

at Wallace Wade Stadium • Durham, North Carolina

- Date: Saturday, November 27, 2021
- Game time: 9:30 a.m. EDT
- Game weather: Sunny • Temperature: 47 °F (8 °C) •
- Game attendance: 17,391
- TV announcers (ACCRSN): Tom Werme (play-by-play), James Bates (analyst), Wiley Ballard (sideline)

Game information

First quarter

- (10:47) DUKE – Charlie Ham 40-yard field goal (Drive: 10 plays, 37 yards, 4:06; Duke 3–0)
- (8:37) MIA – Andrés Borregales 35-yard field goal (Drive: 6 plays, 54 yards, 2:03; Tied 3–3)
- (8:25) DUKE – Jaylen Stinson 94-yard kick return, (Charlie Ham kick) (Duke 10–3)
- (5:05) MIA – Xavier Restrepo 21-yard pass from Tyler Van Dyke, (Andrés Borregales kick) (Drive: 10 plays, 75 yards, 3:20; Tied 10–10)

Second quarter

- (14:20) MIA – Charleston Rambo 12-yard pass from Tyler Van Dyke, (Andrés Borregales kick) (Drive: 9 plays, 70 yards, 3:26; Miami 17–10)
- (8:30) MIA – Jaylan Knighton 2-yard run, (Andrés Borregales kick) (Drive: 5 plays, 80 yards, 2:04; Miami 24–10)
- (3:04) MIA – Andrés Borregales 29-yard field goal (Drive: 8 plays, 41 yards, 2:38; Miami 27–10)
- (0:00) MIA – Andrés Borregales 25-yard field goal (Drive: 14 plays, 75 yards, 2:00; Miami 30–10)

Third quarter

- (9:43) MIA – Andrés Borregales 43-yard field goal (Drive: 12 plays, 49 yards, 5:17; Miami 33–10)
- (7:15) MIA – Charleston Rambo 14-yard pass from Tyler Van Dyke, (Andrés Borregales kick) (Drive: 4 plays, 32 yards, 1:22; Miami 40–10)
- (1:16) MIA – Thaddius Franklin Jr. 9-yard run, (Camden Price kick) (Drive: 8 plays, 53 yards, 2:23; Miami 47–10)

Fourth quarter

- No scoring plays.

Statistics	MIA	DUKE
First downs	33	15
Plays–yards	91–536	69–224
Rushes–yards	36–140	34–62
Passing yards	390	157
Passing: comp–att–int	35–52–0	21–35–1
Turnovers		
Time of possession	32:28	27:22

Team	Category	Player	Statistics
Miami	Passing	Tyler Van Dyke	34/49, 381 yards, 3 TD
Miami	Rushing	Jaylen Knighton	13 carries, 51 yards, TD
Miami	Receiving	Charleston Rambo	8 receptions 101 yards, 2 TD
Duke	Passing	Gunnar Holmberg	20/33, 148 yards, INT
Duke	Rushing	Mataeo Durant	22 carries, 68 yards
Duke	Receiving	Jalon Calhoun	4 receptions, 33 yards

== Rankings ==
Ranking movements Legend: ██ Increase in ranking ██ Decrease in ranking — = Not ranked RV = Received votes
	Week																	
Poll	Pre	1	2	3	4	5	6	7	8	9	10	11	12	13	14	15	16	Final
AP	14	22	24	—	—	—	—	—	—	—	—	—	—	—	—	—	—	—
Coaches	16	24	RV	RV	—	—	—	—	—	—	—	—	—	—	—	—	—	—
CFP	Not released												—	—	—	—	—	Not released

== Players drafted into the NFL ==
Round	Pick	Player	Position	NFL Club
7	234	Jonathan Ford	DT	Green Bay Packers
