= 2021 Duke Blue Devils football team =

American college football season

2021 Duke Blue Devils football
- Conference: Atlantic Coast Conference
- Coastal Division
- Record: 3–9 (0–8 ACC)
- Head coach: David Cutcliffe (14th season)
- Co-offensive coordinators: Re'quan Boyette (1st season); Jeff Faris (1st season)
- Offensive scheme: Multiple
- Co-defensive coordinators: Ben Albert (4th season); Matt Guerrieri (4th season)
- Base defense: 4–2–5
- Captains: Jake Bobo; DeWayne Carter; Gunnar Holmberg; Leonard Johnson; Jack Wohlabaugh
- Home stadium: Wallace Wade Stadium

2021 Atlantic Coast Conference football standings
	Conf.			Overall
Team	W		L	W		L
Atlantic Division
No. 15 Wake Forest xy	7	–	1	11	–	3
No. 20 NC State	6	–	2	9	–	3
No. 14 Clemson	6	–	2	10	–	3
Louisville	4	–	4	6	–	7
Florida State	4	–	4	5	–	7
Boston College	2	–	6	6	–	6
Syracuse	2	–	6	5	–	7
Coastal Division
No. 13 Pittsburgh xy$	7	–	1	11	–	3
Miami (FL)	5	–	3	7	–	5
Virginia Tech	4	–	4	6	–	7
Virginia	4	–	4	6	–	6
North Carolina	3	–	5	6	–	7
Georgia Tech	2	–	6	3	–	9
Duke	0	–	8	3	–	9
Championship: Pittsburgh 45, Wake Forest 21
$ – Conference champion; x – Division champion/co-champions; y – Championship game participant; Rankings from AP Poll

The 2021 Duke Blue Devils football team represented Duke University in the 2021 NCAA Division I FBS football season as a member of the Atlantic Coast Conference (ACC) in the Coastal Division. The Blue Devils were led by head coach David Cutcliffe, in his 14th year, and played their home games at Wallace Wade Stadium in Durham, North Carolina. They finished the season 3–9, 0–8 in ACC play to finish in last place in the Coastal division.

On November 28, 2021, the school announced that long-time coach David Cutcliffe would not return as head coach of the Blue Devils. On December 10, the school named Texas A&M defensive coordinator Mike Elko the team's new head coach.

== Schedule ==
Date	Time	Opponent	Site	TV	Result	Attendance
September 3	7:00 p.m.	at Charlotte*	Jerry Richardson Stadium; Charlotte, NC	CBSSN	L 28–31	14,125
September 10	8:00 p.m.	North Carolina A&T*	Wallace Wade Stadium; Durham, NC	ACCN	W 45–17	18,091
September 18	4:00 p.m.	Northwestern*	Wallace Wade Stadium; Durham, NC	ACCN	W 30–23	12,323
September 25	4:00 p.m.	Kansas*	Wallace Wade Stadium; Durham, NC	ACCN	W 52–33	19,128
October 2	12:00 p.m.	at North Carolina	Kenan Stadium; Chapel Hill, NC (Victory Bell)	ESPN2	L 7–38	45,812
October 9	12:30 p.m.	Georgia Tech	Wallace Wade Stadium; Durham, NC	ACC RSN	L 27–31	11,849
October 16	12:30 p.m.	at Virginia	Scott Stadium; Charlottesville, VA	ACC RSN	L 0–48	38,489
October 30	4:00 p.m.	at No. 13 Wake Forest	Truist Field at Wake Forest; Winston-Salem, NC (rivalry)	ACCN	L 7–45	31,613
November 6	12:00 p.m.	No. 25 Pittsburgh	Wallace Wade Stadium; Durham, NC	ACCN	L 29–54	20,693
November 13	3:30 p.m.	at Virginia Tech	Lane Stadium; Blacksburg, VA	ACCN	L 17–48	56,730
November 18	7:30 p.m.	Louisville	Wallace Wade Stadium; Durham, NC	ESPN	L 22–62	8,493
November 27	12:30 p.m.	Miami (FL)	Wallace Wade Stadium; Durham, NC	ACC RSN	L 10–47	17,391
*Non-conference game; Rankings from AP and CFP Rankings after November 2; All times are in Eastern time

== Roster ==
2021 Duke Blue Devils football team roster
Players
Coaches
Offense

Pos.	#	Name	Class
WR	0	Joe Hardison	Sr
WR	1	Jontavis Robertson	So
QB	2	Luca Diamont	Fr
WR	3	Darrell Jr. Harding	Jr
WR	4	Nick Lampert	Fr
WR	5	Jalon Calhoun	Jr
WR	6	Eli Pancol	Jr
RB	7	Jordan Waters	So
QB	8	Jordan Moore	Fr
QB	10	Riley Leonard	Fr
QB	12	Gunnar Holmberg	GS
QB	13	Jack Colyar	Jr
RB	15	Nakeie Montgomery	GS
QB	16	Gavin Spurrier	Jr
WR	18	Malik Bowen-Sims	So
WR	19	Jake Bobo	Sr
RB	20	Jaquez Moore	Fr
RB	21	Mataeo Durant	Sr
RB	22	Jaylen Coleman	So
WR	23	Edwin III Barnes	So
WR	24	Jarett Garner	Jr
RB	25	Trent Davis	Fr
WR	26	William Robertson	So
RB	27	Nate Kyei-Donkor	GS
RB	41	Grissim Anderson	So
TE	46	Mason Russell	So
WR	47	Calvin Kim	Fr
C	50	Jack Wohlabaugh	Sr
C	52	Addison Penn	Fr
C	55	Will Taylor	Sr
G	61	Zach Thomson	Sr
OT	62	Graham Barton	So
G	63	Jacob Monk	Jr
G	64	Brian Foley	GS
C	66	Andrew Jones	Fr
C	68	Elijah Wroten	So
G	69	Kade Parmelly	GS
OT	70	John Gelotte	So
G	71	Maurice McIntyre	Jr
OT	73	Anthony Hinton	Jr
OT	75	Calib Perez	Fr
OT	76	Peace Addo	Jr
OT	77	Justin Pickett	Fr
G	78	Casey Holman	Jr
OT	79	Carson Van Lynn	GS
TE	80	Matt Smith	So
TE	81	Nicky Dalmolin	Jr
TE	82	Cole Finney	Fr
WR	83	Brandon Hersh	So
WR	84	Trevor Horton	Jr
WR	85	Sahmir Hagans	Fr
TE	86	Brendan Pernicky	So
TE	87	Patrick Leitten	GS
TE	88	Jake Marwede	Sr
WR	89	Scott Boylan	GS

Defense

Pos.	#	Name	Class
CB	4	Cameron Bergeron	Fr
S	9	J'Marick Woods	GS
S	10	James II Hopson	So
CB	11	Isaiah Fisher-Smith	So
CB	13	Tony Davis	So
S	14	Trent Broadnax	Fr
S	15	Placide Djungu-Sungu	Fr
S	16	Jaylen Stinson	So
S	17	Da'Quan Johnson	So
CB	21	Khilan Walker	So
S	23	Lummie IV Young	Sr
S	24	Cole Carteaux	Sr
CB	26	Joshua Pickett	Fr
CB	28	Dylan Merrell	Fr
S	29	Nate Thompson	Jr
S	30	Brandon Johnson	Fr
CB	31	Josh Blackwell	GS
S	32	Jalen Alexander	Jr
CB	33	Leonard Johnson	Sr
LB	34	Sayyid Stevens	So
LB	35	Dorian Mausi	So
LB	36	Nick Jr. Morris	Fr
CB	37	Ken Torain	Jr
CB	38	Dominique Long	GS
CB	39	Jeremiah Lewis	Jr
LB	40	Ryan Smith	So
LB	42	Shaka Heyward	Jr
LB	43	Adam Fakih	GS
LB	45	Colby Campbell	GS
S	47	Steve Mann	GS
LB	48	Tre Freeman	Fr
DT	51	Mandela Tobin	Fr
LB	54	Jason Hoffman	Fr
DT	55	Ja'Mion Franklin	Jr
DT	58	Gary III Smith	So
DE	59	Michael Reese	So
DT	74	Michael Larbie	Jr
DE	83	Zamari Ellis	Jr
DE	86	Ron Carr	So
DT	90	DeWayne Carter	So
DE	91	Ahmad Craig	So
DT	92	Aeneas Peebles	So
DE	93	Ben Frye	GS
DE	94	R.J. Oben	So
DE	95	Trey III Brown	Fr
DE	96	Aaron Hall	Fr
DE	97	Caleb Oppan	So
DT	99	Christian Rorie	So

Special teams

Pos.	#	Name	Class
P	37	Jackson Hubbard	Jr
K	44	Charlie Ham	So
K	49	Matt Alswanger	GS
K	49	Connor Wood	Fr
LS	56	Casey Donahue	Fr
LS	57	John Taylor	GS
LS	65	Colin Ross	So
LS	72	Jack Griffin	Jr
LS	73	Curtis Cooper	Fr
P	98	Porter Wilson	So

Head coach

- David Cutcliffe

Coordinators/assistant coaches

- Zac Roper – Assistant head coach / tight ends
- Trooper Taylor – Assistant head coach / cornerbacks
- Ben Albert – Co-defensive coordinator / linebackers
- Matt Guerrieri – Co-defensive coordinator / safeties
- Re'quan Boyette – Co-offensive coordinator / wide receivers
- Jeff Faris – Co-offensive coordinator / quarterbacks
- Kurt Benedict – Special teams coordinator / defensive assistant
- Greg Frey – Recruiting Coordinator / offensive line
- Calvin Magee – Running backs
- Sam McGrath – Linebackers

Legend

- (C) Team captain
- (S) Suspended
- (I) Ineligible
- Injured
- Redshirt

Roster
Last update: December 7, 2024
