= 2021 NC State Wolfpack football team =

American college football season

2021 NC State Wolfpack football

Holiday Bowl, vs. UCLA, Awarded Game by Organisers
- Conference: Atlantic Coast Conference
- Atlantic Division

Ranking
- Coaches: No. 19
- AP: No. 20
- Record: 9–3 (6–2 ACC)
- Head coach: Dave Doeren (9th season)
- Offensive coordinator: Tim Beck (2nd season)
- Offensive scheme: Spread option
- Defensive coordinator: Tony Gibson (3rd season)
- Base defense: 3–3–5
- Home stadium: Carter–Finley Stadium

2021 Atlantic Coast Conference football standings
	Conf.			Overall
Team	W		L	W		L
Atlantic Division
No. 15 Wake Forest xy	7	–	1	11	–	3
No. 20 NC State	6	–	2	9	–	3
No. 14 Clemson	6	–	2	10	–	3
Louisville	4	–	4	6	–	7
Florida State	4	–	4	5	–	7
Boston College	2	–	6	6	–	6
Syracuse	2	–	6	5	–	7
Coastal Division
No. 13 Pittsburgh xy$	7	–	1	11	–	3
Miami (FL)	5	–	3	7	–	5
Virginia Tech	4	–	4	6	–	7
Virginia	4	–	4	6	–	6
North Carolina	3	–	5	6	–	7
Georgia Tech	2	–	6	3	–	9
Duke	0	–	8	3	–	9
Championship: Pittsburgh 45, Wake Forest 21
$ – Conference champion; x – Division champion/co-champions; y – Championship game participant; Rankings from AP Poll

The 2021 NC State Wolfpack football team represented North Carolina State University during the 2021 NCAA Division I FBS football season. The Wolfpack played their home games at Carter–Finley Stadium in Raleigh, North Carolina and competed in the Atlantic Division of the Atlantic Coast Conference. They were led by ninth-year head coach Dave Doeren.

The Wolfpack finished their regular season with a 9–3 overall record, and accepted a bid to the Holiday Bowl, where they were due to face UCLA. Hours before the game time on December 28, UCLA withdrew from the bowl due to COVID-19 issues and the bowl was canceled. NC State was awarded the Holiday Bowl trophy after the cancellation and considers the game forfeited, giving the program its second (after 2002) 10-win season—the 10th win (for the Holiday Bowl) is claimed by NC State and not officially recognized by the NCAA and ACC, even though both participating conferences' policy for the season declared such games in conference a forfeit. NC State beat Clemson for the first time since 2011.

== Schedule ==
NC State announced its 2021 football schedule on January 28, 2021.

Date	Time	Opponent	Rank	Site	TV	Result	Attendance
September 2	7:30 p.m.	South Florida*		Carter–Finley Stadium; Raleigh, NC	ACCN	W 45–0	52,633
September 11	7:00 p.m.	at Mississippi State*		Davis Wade Stadium; Starkville, MS	ESPN2	L 10–24	45,834
September 18	7:30 p.m.	Furman*		Carter–Finley Stadium; Raleigh, NC	ACCRSN	W 45–7	56,919
September 25	3:30 p.m.	No. 9 Clemson		Carter–Finley Stadium; Raleigh, NC (Textile Bowl)	ESPN	W 27–21 ^{2OT}	56,919
October 2	6:00 p.m.	Louisiana Tech*	No. 23	Carter–Finley Stadium; Raleigh, NC	ACCNX/ESPN+	W 34–27	51,064
October 16	7:30 p.m.	at Boston College	No. 22	Alumni Stadium; Chestnut Hill, MA	ACCN	W 33–7	40,349
October 23	7:30 p.m.	at Miami	No. 18	Hard Rock Stadium; Miami Gardens, FL	ESPN2	L 30–31	43,293
October 30	7:30 p.m.	Louisville^{†}		Carter–Finley Stadium; Raleigh, NC	ACCN	W 28–13	53,123
November 6	4:00 p.m.	at Florida State	No. 19	Doak Campbell Stadium; Tallahassee, FL	ACCN	W 28–14	50,835
November 13	7:30 p.m.	at No. 12 Wake Forest	No. 16	Truist Field at Wake Forest; Winston-Salem, NC (rivalry)	ACCN	L 42–45	34,503
November 20	4:00 p.m.	Syracuse	No. 20	Carter–Finley Stadium; Raleigh, NC	ACCN	W 41–17	54,083
November 26	7:00 p.m.	North Carolina	No. 20	Carter–Finley Stadium; Raleigh, NC (rivalry)	ESPN	W 34–30	56,919
~~December 28~~	~~8:00 p.m.~~	vs. ~~UCLA~~*	No. 18	~~Petco Park~~; ~~San Diego, CA~~ (~~Holiday Bowl~~)	~~Fox~~	Canceled	_
*Non-conference game; ^{†}Homecoming; Rankings from AP Poll (and CFP Rankings, after November 2) - Released prior to game; All times are in Eastern time

== Coaching staff ==
Name	Title
Dave Doeren	Head Coach
Tim Beck	Offensive coordinator/quarterbacks
Tony Gibson	Defensive coordinator/linebackers
Charlie Wiles	Defensive Line
Joe DeForest	Safeties
Todd Goebbel	Tight Ends/special teams
Freddie Aughtry-Lindsay	Nickels
John Garrison	Offensive Line
Brian Mitchell	Cornerbacks
Kurt Roper	Running Backs
Ruffin McNeill	Special Assistant to the head coach

== Roster ==
2021 NC State Wolfpack football team roster
Quarterbacks: 10 Ben Finley – freshman (6'1, 201); 11 Andrew Harvey – freshman (6'2, 209); 12 Zo Wallace – freshman (6'1, 254); 13 Devin Leary – sophomore (6'1, 212) (redshirt); 16 Aaron McLaughlin – freshman (6'5, 230); Running backs: 3 Jordan Houston – sophomore (5'10, 190); 6 Trent Pennix – sophomore (6'3, 236) (redshirt); 7 Zonovan Knight – sophomore (5'11, 210); 8 Ricky Person Jr. – junior(6'1, 222); 26 Demi Sumo – freshman (6'0, 200); 30 Keon Caudle Jr. – freshman (5'1, 213); 34 Delbert Mimms III – freshman (5'11, 220) (redshirt); 36 Demarcus Jones II – freshman (5'10, 213) (redshirt); 38 Joey Ray – sophomore (5'9, 200) (redshirt); Wide receivers: 4 Porter Rooks – freshman (6'1, 190); 5 Thayer Thomas – junior (6'0, 197) (redshirt); 15 Keyon Lesane – sophomore (5'11, 190); 19 C.J. Riley – graduate (6'4, 230); 20 Julian Gray – freshman (5'11, 193); 21 Jalen Coit – freshman (5'11, 156); 22 Micah Crowell – freshman (6'1, 215); 24 Christopher Scott Jr. – freshman (6'0, 160); 29 Christopher Toudle – freshman (6'4, 240) (redshirt); 31 Dillon Mosley – freshman (6'0, 184); 33 Jackson DeSilva – freshman (6'1, 200) (redshirt); 35 Michael Fox – sophomore (6'0, 174) (redshirt); 80 Justin Dunn – sophomore (6'1, 200) (redshirt); 83 Josh Crabtree – freshman (6'3, 193); 84 Jasiah Provillon – sophomore (6'2, 208) (redshirt); 85 Anthony Smith – freshman (6'2, 185); 86 Emeka Emezie – senior (6'3, 212); 88 Devin Carter – sophomore (6'3, 216) (redshirt); 85 Jakolbe Baldwin – freshman (6'0, 207); Tight ends: 28 Dylan Parham – senior (6'5, 245) (redshirt); 39 Ezemdi Udoh – freshman (6'5, 247); 45 Camden Woods – sophomore (6'2, 230) (redshirt); 46 Andrew Jayne – freshman (6'6, 232); 47 Cedd Seabrough – freshman (6'4, 215); 48 Fred Seabrough Jr. – freshman (6'4, 215); 87 Kameron Walker – freshman (6'5, 250) (redshirt); Punters: 98 Caden Noonkester – freshman (6'6, 200); 99 Trenton Gill – junior (6'4, 219) (redshirt)	Offensive lineman: 50 Grant Gibson – junior (6'1, 305) (redshirt); 52 Timothy McKay – freshman (6'4, 300) (redshirt); 53 Derrick Eason – sophomore (6'4, 309) (redshirt); 54 Dylan McMahon – freshman (6'4, 300) (redshirt); 55 Tyrone Riley – graduate (6'6, 305); 56 Bryson Speas – sophomore (6'4, 290) (redshirt); 57 Lyndon Cooper – freshman (6'2, 340); 60 Ethan Lane – freshman (6'3, 290); 61 Bo Ressler – sophomore (6'7, 305) (redshirt); 62 Jaleel Davis – freshman (6'6, 300); 64 Chandler Zavala – graduate (6'5, 325); 67 Brendan Lawson – freshman (6'2, 270); 68 Matt McCabe – freshman (6'6, 260); 70 Walter Karstens – freshman (6'7, 360) (redshirt); 71 Thornton Gentry – freshman (6'4, 308); 72 Dean Hill – freshman (6'3, 305); 74 Anthony Belton – sophomore (6'6, 335); 75 Anthony Carter Jr. – freshman (6'3, 310); 76 Patrick Matan – freshman (6'4, 300); 78 Jason Roesel – freshman (6'3, 252); 79 Ikem Ekwonu – sophomore (6'4, 320); Defensive lineman: 0 Terrell Dawkins – freshman (6'4, 245) (redshirt); 5 C.J. Clark – freshman (6'3, 300) (redshirt); 42 Danny Blakeman – junior (6'2, 269) (redshirt); 44 Joshua Harris – freshman (6'4, 350) (redshirt); 45 Davin Vann – freshman (6'2, 296); 48 Cory Durden – graduate (6'4, 310); 52 Ibrahim Kante – junior (6'4, 263) (redshirt); 53 Derrick Eason – sophomore (6'4, 309) (redshirt); 54 Zyun Reeves – freshman (6'7, 265); 55 Joshua Harris– freshman (6'4, 350) (redshirt); 57 Jayden Tate – freshman (5'10, 262); 58 Travali Price – freshman (6'4, 260); 90 Savion Jackson – sophomore (6'2, 290); 91 Jerome Williams – freshman (6'1, 277) (redshirt); 94 Alec Neugent – freshman (6'2, 254) (redshirt); 97 Claude Larkins – freshman (6'4, 284); 99 Daniel Joseph – graduate (6'3, 265)	Placekickers: 32 Christopher Dunn – junior (5'8, 184); 90 Collin Smith – freshman (5'9, 187) (redshirt); 93 Ian Williams – freshman (6'3, 232); Linebackers: 1 Isaiah Moore – junior (6'2, 236) (redshirt); 2 Jaylon Scott – sophomore (6'1, 245); 11 Payton Wilson – sophomore (6'4, 235) (redshirt); 26 Devon Betty – freshman (6'1, 225); 27 Jayland Parker – freshman (6'1, 202); 28 Aristotle Bowles – junior (5'11, 212); 31 Vi Jones – junior (6'3, 227) (redshirt); 32 Drake Thomas – sophomore (6'0, 238); 33 Jordan Poole – freshman (6'0, 222); 39 Jamie Shaw – freshman (6'4, 242) (redshirt); 41 Caden Fordham – freshman (6'1, 214); 43 Colby Johnson – freshman (6'0, 198); 47 Alex Gray – sophomore (6'1, 218) (redshirt); 49 Bernard Flerlage – freshman (6'0, 245); Defensive backs: 3 Aydan White – freshman (6'0, 178); 7 Chris Ingram – senior (6'0, 186); 8 Jalen Frazier – freshman (5'9, 181) (redshirt); 10 Tanner Ingle – junior (5'10, 182); 12 Devan Boykin – freshman (5'10, 187); 13 Tyler Baker-Williams – junior (6'1, 209); 14 Nehki Meredith – freshman (5'9, 180); 15 Cayman Czesak – junior (6'2, 188) (redshirt); 19 Joshua Pierre-Louis – freshman (5'10, 175); 21 Khalid Martin – freshman (6'0, 192) (redshirt); 22 Teshaun Smith – junior (6'3, 192); 24 Derrek Pitts Jr. – graduate (6'1, 182); 25 Shyheim Battle – freshman (6'2, 183) (redshirt); 34 Nate Evans – freshman (6'0, 172); 35 Chase Hattley – freshman (6'3, 205); 36 Samuel Duncan – freshman (6'0, 185); 37 Nicholas Treco – freshman (5'11, 195) (redshirt); 38 Clay Craddock – freshman (6'0, 209); 39 Darius Edmundson – sophomore (6'0, 170) (redshirt); 44 Mario Love Jr. – freshman (5'9, 162); Long snappers: 91 Joe Shimko – sophomore (6'0, 220); 92 Alex McLaughlin – freshman (5'10, 220)

== Game summaries ==
=== South Florida ===
South Florida at NC State

Team	1	2	3	4	Total
Bulls	0	0	0	0	0
• Wolfpack	10	14	14	7	45

- Date: September 2, 2021
- Location: Carter–Finley Stadium
  Raleigh, NC
- Game start: 7:30 p.m. EDT
- Elapsed time: 3 hours, 5 minutes
- Game attendance: 52,633
- Game weather: Temperature: 73 °F (23 °C) • Weather: Sunny
- Referee: Charles Lamertina
- TV announcers (ACCN): Dave O’ Brien (play–by–play), Tim Hasselbeck (analyst), and Kelsey Riggs (sideline reporter)

Scoring summary
1	9:36	NCSU	Ricky Person Jr. 33 yard pass from Devin Leary (Christopher Dunn kick) (9 plays, 76 yards, 3:26)	NCSU 7–0
1	2:14	NCSU	Christopher Dunn 34 yard field goal (9 plays, 30 yards, 3:48)	NCSU 10–0
2	12:39	NCSU	Ricky Person Jr. 11 yard run (Christopher Dunn kick) (6 plays, 70 yards, 2:24)	NCSU 17–0
2	0:48	NCSU	Ricky Person Jr. 11 yard run (Christopher Dunn kick) (3 plays, 77 yards, 0:22)	NCSU 24–0
3	9:30	NCSU	Zonovan Knight 46 yard run (Christopher Dunn kick) (4 plays, 54 yards, 1:31)	NCSU 31–0
3	2:53	NCSU	Christopher Toudle 7 yard pass from Devin Leary (Christopher Dunn kick) (8 plays, 74 yards, 3:31)	NCSU 38–0
4	8:14	NCSU	Jordan Houston 1 yard run (Christopher Dunn kick) (11 plays, 55 yards, 6:30)	NCSU 45–0

Statistics	USF	NCSU
First downs	15	27
Total yards	271	525
Rushing yards	104	293
Passing yards	167	232
Turnovers	3	1
Time of possession	30:48	29:12

Team	Category	Player	Statistics
South Florida	Passing	Timmy McClain	7–13, 126 yards, 2 INT
South Florida	Rushing	Jaren Mangham	5 carries, 26 yards
South Florida	Receiving	Xavier Weaver	2 receptions, 73 yards
NC State	Passing	Devin Leary	17–26, 232 yards, 2 TD, INT
NC State	Rushing	Zonovan Knight	16 carries, 164 yards, 1 TD
NC State	Receiving	Emeka Emezie	5 receptions, 71 yards

=== At Mississippi State ===
NC State at Mississippi State

Team	1	2	3	4	Total
Wolfpack	0	3	0	7	10
• Bulldogs	7	7	7	3	24

- Date: September 11, 2021
- Location: Davis Wade Stadium
  Starkville, MS
- Game start: 7:00 p.m. EDT
- Elapsed time: 3 hours, 35 minutes
- Game attendance: 45,834
- Game weather: Temperature: 83 °F (28 °C) • Weather: Sunny • Wind: SE 4 MPH
- Referee: Jerry Magallanes
- TV announcers (ESPN2): Anish Shroff (play–by–play), Mike Golic Jr. (analyst), and Taylor McGregor (sideline reporter)

Scoring summary
1	14:47	MSSU	Lideatrick Griffin 100 yard kickoff return (Brandon Ruiz kick)	MSSU 7–0
2	12:46	NCSU	Christopher Dunn 45 yard field goal (11 plays, 43 yards, 5:25)	MSSU 7–3
2	1:09	MSSU	Malik Heath 21 yard pass from Will Rogers (Brandon Ruiz kick) (13 plays, 83 yards, 4:30)	MSSU 14–3
3	0:48	MSSU	Jaden Walley 4 yard pass from Will Rogers (Nolan McCord kick) (7 plays, 54 yards, 4:12)	MSSU 21–3
4	12:30	MSSU	Nolan McCord 32 yard field goal (8 plays, 51 yards, 2:23)	MSSU 24–3
4	1:06	NCSU	Thayer Thomas 4 yard pass from Devin Leary (Christopher Dunn kick) (8 plays, 74 yards, 3:16)	MSSU 24–10

Statistics	NCSU	MSSU
First downs	16	15
Total yards	337	316
Rushing yards	34	22
Passing yards	303	294
Turnovers	2	0
Time of possession	28:57	31:03

Team	Category	Player	Statistics
NC State	Passing	Devin Leary	30–49, 303 yards, 1 TD, 1 INT
NC State	Rushing	Zonovan Knight	8 carries, 31 yards
NC State	Receiving	Emeka Emezie	6 receptions, 92 yards
Mississippi State	Passing	Will Rogers	33–49, 294 yards, 2 TD
Mississippi State	Rushing	Dillon Johnson	6 carries, 18 yards
Mississippi State	Receiving	Dillon Johnson	6 receptions, 70 yards

=== Furman ===
Furman at NC State

Team	1	2	3	4	Total
Paladins	0	0	7	0	7
• Wolfpack	10	28	7	7	52

- Date: September 18, 2021
- Location: Carter–Finley Stadium
  Raleigh, NC
- Game start: 7:30 p.m. EDT
- Elapsed time: 3 hours, 7 minutes
- Game attendance: 56,919
- Game weather: Temperature: 80 °F (27 °C) • Weather: Sunny
- Referee: Mike Roche
- TV announcers (ACCRSN): Evan Lepler (play–by–play), Charles Arbuckle (analyst)

Scoring summary
1	8:29	NCSU	Zonovan Knight 1 yard run (Christopher Dunn kick) (8 plays, 69 yards, 3:56)	NCSU 7–0
1	2:14	NCSU	Christopher Dunn 32 yard field goal (6 plays, 48 yards, 3:21)	NCSU 10–0
2	13:52	NCSU	Dylan Parham 4 yard pass from Devin Leary (Christopher Dunn kick) (6 plays, 42 yards, 2:35)	NCSU 17–0
2	6:49	NCSU	Devin Leary 7 yard run (Christopher Dunn kick) (5 plays, 51 yards, 2:09)	NCSU 24–0
2	2:28	NCSU	Anthony Smith 42 yard pass from Devin Leary (Christopher Dunn kick) (7 plays, 77 yards, 2:54)	NCSU 31–0
2	0:24	NCSU	Thayer Thomas 12 yard pass from Devin Leary (Christopher Dunn kick) (6 plays, 75 yards, 0:53)	NCSU 38–0
3	10:53	NCSU	Ricky Person Jr. 1 yard run (Christopher Dunn kick) (5 plays, 39 yards, 2:27)	NCSU 45–0
3	2:09	FUR	Ryan Miller 16 yard pass from Hamp Sisson (Timmy Bleekrode kick) (7 plays, 56 yards, 3:28)	NCSU 45–7

Statistics	FUR	NCSU
First downs	9	25
Total yards	196	505
Rushing yards	92	218
Passing yards	104	287
Turnovers	1	1
Time of possession	27:21	32:39

Team	Category	Player	Statistics
Furman	Passing	Hamp Sisson	8–19, 86 yards, 1 TD, 1 INT
Furman	Rushing	Devin Wynn	9 carries, 27 yards
Furman	Receiving	Ryan Miller	2 receptions, 31 yards, 1 TD
NC State	Passing	Devin Leary	23–29, 259 yards, 3 TD
NC State	Rushing	Zonovan Knight	11 carries, 104 yards, 1 TD
NC State	Receiving	Thayer Thomas	5 receptions, 82 yards, 1 TD

=== No. 9 Clemson ===
No. 9 Clemson at NC State

Team	1	2	3	4	OT	2OT	Total
No. 9 Tigers	7	0	0	7	7	0	21
• Wolfpack	7	0	7	0	7	6	27

- Date: September 25, 2021
- Location: Carter–Finley Stadium
  Raleigh, NC
- Game start: 3:30 p.m. EDT
- Elapsed time: 4 hours, 9 minutes
- Game attendance: 56,919
- Game weather: Temperature: 75 °F (24 °C) • Weather: Sunny
- Referee: Jeff Flanagan
- TV announcers (ESPN): Mark Jones (play–by–play), Robert Griffin III (analyst), and Quint Kessenich (sideline reporter)

Scoring summary
1	9:11	CLEM	Justyn Ross 32 yard pass from DJ Uiagalelei (B. T. Potter kick) (5 plays, 80 yards, 1:33)	CLEM 7–0
1	0:05	NCSU	Emeka Emezie 9 yard pass from Devin Leary (Christopher Dunn kick) (10 plays, 54 yards, 4:43)	Tied 7–7
3	5:10	NCSU	Devin Carter 12 yard pass from Devin Leary (Christopher Dunn kick) (9 plays, 77 yards, 4:09)	NCSU 14–7
4	10:52	CLEM	Will Shipley 5 yard run (B. T. Potter kick) (7 plays, 80 yards, 2:41)	Tied 14–14
1OT		CLEM	Justyn Ross 9 yard pass from DJ Uiagalelei (B. T. Potter kick) (5 plays, 25 yards)	CLEM 21–14
1OT		NCSU	Thayer Thomas 2 yard pass from Devin Leary (Christopher Dunn kick) (7 plays, 25 yards)	Tied 21–21
2OT		NCSU	Devin Carter 22 yard pass from Devin Leary (Two-point conversion failed) (2 plays, 25 yards)	NCSU 27–21

Statistics	CLEM	NCSU
First downs	10	31
Total yards	214	386
Rushing yards	103	148
Passing yards	111	238
Turnovers	1	1
Time of possession	18:12	41:48

Team	Category	Player	Statistics
Clemson	Passing	DJ Uiagalelei	12–26, 111 yards, 2 TD, 1 INT
Clemson	Rushing	DJ Uiagalelei	9 carries, 63 yards
Clemson	Receiving	Justyn Ross	8 receptions, 77 yards, 2 TD
NC State	Passing	Devin Leary	32–44, 238 yards, 4 TD
NC State	Rushing	Ricky Person Jr.	21 carries, 91 yards
NC State	Receiving	Emeka Emezie	14 receptions, 116 yards, 1 TD

=== Louisiana Tech ===
Louisiana Tech at No. 23 NC State

Team	1	2	3	4	Total
Bulldogs	0	10	3	14	27
• No. 23 Wolfpack	7	6	14	7	34

- Date: October 2, 2021
- Location: Carter–Finley Stadium
  Raleigh, NC
- Game start: 6:00 p.m. EDT
- Elapsed time: 3 hours, 37 minutes
- Game attendance: 51,064
- Game weather: Temperature: 79 °F (26 °C) • Weather: Sunny
- Referee: Gary Patterson
- TV announcers (ACCNX/ESPN+): John Schriffen (play–by–play), Rene Ingoglia (analyst), and Tori Petry (sideline reporter)

Scoring summary
1	2:18	NCSU	Christopher Toudle 6 yard pass from Devin Leary (Christopher Dunn kick) (10 plays, 91 yards, 5:30)	NCSU 7–0
2	13:19	LT	Jacob Adams 2 yard pass from Austin Kendall (Jacob Barnes kick) (9 plays, 75 yards, 3:59)	Tied 7–7
2	5:37	NCSU	Christopher Dunn 36 yard field goal (6 plays, 37 yards, 1:55)	NCSU 10–7
2	2:12	LT	Jacob Barnes 21 yard field goal (7 plays, 72 yards, 3:25)	Tied 10–10
2	0:02	NCSU	Christopher Dunn 29 yard field goal (7 plays, 57 yards, 0:36)	NCSU 13–10
3	10:44	NCSU	Ricky Person Jr. 24 yard run (Christopher Dunn kick) (2 plays, 40 yards, 0:43)	NCSU 20–10
3	6:17	LT	Jacob Barnes 38 yard field goal (8 plays, 55 yards, 4:27)	NCSU 20–13
3	3:02	NCSU	C.J. Riley 5 yard pass from Devin Lear (Christopher Dunn kick) (7 plays, 71 yards, 3:15)	NCSU 27–13
4	12:10	LT	Bub Means 23 yard pass from Austin Kendall (Jacob Barnes kick) (5 plays, 68 yards, 1:51)	NCSU 27–20
4	7:45	NCSU	Zonovan Knight 4 yard run (Christopher Dunn kick) (8 plays, 72 yards, 4:20)	NCSU 34–20
4	4:43	LT	Griffin Hebert 14 yard pass from Austin Kendall (Jacob Barnes kick) (9 plays, 75 yards, 3:02)	NCSU 34–27

Statistics	La Tech	NCSU
First downs	26	23
Total yards	480	418
Rushing yards	139	167
Passing yards	341	251
Turnovers	2	0
Time of possession	30:43	29:17

Team	Category	Player	Statistics
Louisiana Tech	Passing	Austin Kendall	26–43, 341 yards, 3 TD, 2 INT
Louisiana Tech	Rushing	Austin Kendall	15 carries, 71 yards
Louisiana Tech	Receiving	Bub Means	6 receptions, 95 yards, 1 TD
NC State	Passing	Devin Leary	22–36, 251 yards, 2 TD
NC State	Rushing	Ricky Person Jr.	15 carries, 90 yards, 1 TD
NC State	Receiving	Emeka Emezie	4 receptions, 67 yards

=== At Boston College ===
No. 22 NC State at Boston College

Team	1	2	3	4	Total
• No. 22 Wolfpack	7	3	21	2	33
Eagles	7	0	0	0	7

- Date: October 16, 2021
- Location: Alumni Stadium
  Chestnut Hill, MA
- Game start: 7:30 p.m. EDT
- Elapsed time: 3:08
- Game attendance: 40,349
- Game weather: Temperature: 75 °F (24 °C) • Weather: Cloudy/Rain • Wind: S 13 MPH
- Referee: Riley Johnson
- TV announcers (ACCN): Dave O'Brien (play–by–play), Tim Hasselbeck (analyst), and Kelsey Riggs (sideline reporter)

Scoring summary
1	12:44	NCSU	Devin Carter 40 yard pass from Devin Leary (Christopher Dunn kick) (5 plays, 75 yards, 2:16)	NCSU 7–0
1	8:47	BC	Trae Barry 8 yard pass from Dennis Grosel (Connor Lytton kick) (10 plays, 75 yards, 3:27)	Tied 7–7
2	0:00	NCSU	Christopher Dunn 27 yard field goal (16 plays, 70 yards, 6:05)	NCSU 10–7
3	12:03	NCSU	Devan Boykin 34 yard fumble recovery (Christopher Dunn kick)	NCSU 17–7
3	7:05	NCSU	Dylan Parham 4 yard pass from Devin Leary (Christopher Dunn kick) (7 plays, 61 yards, 3:47)	NCSU 24–7
3	4:23	NCSU	Thayer Thomas 79 yard pass from Devin Leary (Christopher Dunn kick) (2 plays, 79 yards, 0:58)	NCSU 31–7
4	3:39	NCSU	Devon Betty 0 yard safety	NCSU 33–7

Statistics	NCSU	BC
First downs	16	17
Total yards	381	291
Rushing yards	130	97
Passing yards	251	194
Turnovers	0	3
Time of possession	31:53	28:07

Team	Category	Player	Statistics
NC State	Passing	Devin Leary	16–24, 251 yards, 3 TD
NC State	Rushing	Jordan Houston	8 carries, 43 yards
NC State	Receiving	Thayer Thomas	4 receptions, 122 yards, 1 TD
Boston College	Passing	Dennis Grosel	21–39, 194 yards, 1 TD, 1 INT
Boston College	Rushing	Patrick Garwo	1 carries, 52 yards
Boston College	Receiving	Jaelen Gill	5 receptions, 71 yards

=== At Miami ===
No. 18 NC State at Miami

Team	1	2	3	4	Total
No. 18 Wolfpack	3	14	3	10	30
• Hurricanes	7	7	10	7	31

- Date: October 23, 2021
- Location: Hard Rock Stadium
  Coral Gables, FL
- Game start: 7:30 p.m. EDT
- Elapsed time: 3:38
- Game attendance: 43,293
- Game weather: Temperature: 82 °F (28 °C) • Weather: Cloudy • Wind: NE 9 MPH
- Referee: Jerry Magallanes
- TV announcers (ESPN2): Anish Shroff (play–by–play), Mike Golic Jr. (analyst), and Taylor McGregor (sideline reporter)

Scoring summary
1	10:50	MIA	Charleston Rambo 25 yard pass from Tyler Van Dyke (Andres Borregales kick) (8 plays, 75 yards, 2:37)	MIA 7–0
1	4:24	NCSU	Christopher Dunn 33 yard field goal (8 plays, 52 yards, 3:34)	MIA 7–3
2	13:41	MIA	Jaylan Knighton 53 yard pass from Tyler Van Dyke (Andres Borregales kick) (6 plays, 76 yards, 2:25)	MIA 14–3
2	8:59	NCSU	Thayer Thomas 7 yard pass from Devin Leary (Christopher Dunn kick) (10 plays, 75 yards, 4:42)	MIA 14–10
2	0:15	NCSU	Thayer Thomas 27 yard pass from Devin Leary (Christopher Dunn kick) (3 plays, 77 yards, 0:32)	NCSU 17–14
3	13:24	MIA	Will Mallory 5 yard pass from Tyler Van Dyke (Andres Borregales kick) (5 plays, 75 yards, 1:36)	MIA 21–17
3	7:09	NCSU	Christopher Dunn 44 yard field goal (8 plays, 26 yards, 3:21)	MIA 21–20
3	3:22	MIA	Andres Borregales 22 yard field goal (9 plays, 70 yards, 3:47)	MIA 24–20
4	14:45	NCSU	Devin Leary 17 yard run (Christopher Dunn kick) (7 plays, 79 yards, 3:31)	NCSU 27–24
4	9:34	MIA	Charleston Rambo 4 yard pass from Tyler Van Dyke (Andres Borregales kick) (11 plays, 75 yards, 5:11)	MIA 31–27
4	5:39	NCSU	Christopher Dunn 40 yard field goal (7 plays, 52 yards, 3:49)	MIA 31–30

Statistics	NCSU	MIA
First downs	18	18
Total yards	421	420
Rushing yards	111	95
Passing yards	310	325
Turnovers	0	0
Time of possession	28:30	31:30

Team	Category	Player	Statistics
NC State	Passing	Devin Leary	24–42, 310 yards, 2 TD
NC State	Rushing	Ricky Person Jr.	9 carries, 54 yards
NC State	Receiving	Emeka Emezie	3 receptions, 75 yards
Miami	Passing	Tyler Van Dyke	25–33, 325 yards, 4 TD
Miami	Rushing	Jaylan Knighton	21 carries, 83 yards
Miami	Receiving	Charleston Rambo	9 receptions, 127 yards, 2 TD

=== vs Louisville ===
NC State vs Louisville

Team	1	2	3	4	Total
Cardinals	7	0	3	3	13
• Wolfpack	7	0	0	21	28

- Date: October 30, 2021
- Location: Carter-Finley Stadium
  Raleigh, NC
- Game start: 7:30 p.m. EDT
- Elapsed time: 3:31
- Game attendance: 53,123
- Game weather: Temperature: 58 °F (14 °C) • Weather: Cloudy
- Referee: Mike Roche
- TV announcers (ACCN): Dave O’ Brien (play–by–play), Tim Hasselbeck (analyst), and Kelsey Riggs (sideline reporter)

Scoring summary
1	0:48	NCSU	Emeka Emezie 19 yard pass from Devin Leary (Christopher Dunn kick) (9 plays, 80 yards, 4:21)	NCSU 7–0
1	0:00	LOU	Jordan Watkins 76 yard pass from Malik Cunningham (James Turner Kick) (3 plays, 79 yards, 0:42)	Tied 7–7
3	11:15	LOU	James Turner 42 yard field goal (8 plays, 51 yards, 3:45)	LOU 10–7
4	14:26	NCSU	Trent Pennix 29 yard pass from Devin Leary (Christopher Dunn Kick) (7 plays, 83 yards, 3:37)	NCSU 14–10
4	9:51	LOU	James Turner 31 yard field goal (9 plays, 62 yards, 4:35)	NCSU 14–13
4	5:53	NCSU	Devin Carter 12 yard pass from Devin Leary (Christopher Dunn Kick) (9 plays, 75 yards, 3:58)	NCSU 21–13
4	2:21	NCSU	C.J. Riley 10 yard pass from Devin Leary (Christopher Dunn Kick) (4 plays, 34 yards, 2:19)	NCSU 28–13

Statistics	LOU	NCSU
First downs	17	19
Total yards	434	361
Rushing yards	219	317
Passing yards	215	44
Turnovers	1	0
Time of possession	30:37	29:23

Team	Category	Player	Statistics
Louisville	Passing	Malik Cunningham	11–28, 219 yards, 1 TD, 1 INT
Louisville	Rushing	Malik Cunningham	18 carries, 76 yards
Louisville	Receiving	Jordan Watkins	2 receptions, 83 yards, 1 TD
NC State	Passing	Devin Leary	25–36, 317 yards, 4 TD
NC State	Rushing	Zonovan Knight	11 carries, 23 yards
NC State	Receiving	Emeka Emezie	5 receptions, 91 yards, 1 TD

=== At Florida State ===
No. 19 NC State at Florida State

Team	1	2	3	4	Total
• No. 19 Wolfpack	7	7	7	7	28
Seminoles	0	0	14	0	14

- Date: November 6, 2021
- Location: Doak Campbell Stadium
  Tallahassee, FL
- Game start: 4:00 p.m. EDT
- Elapsed time: 3:19
- Game attendance: 50,835
- Game weather: Temperature: 61 °F (16 °C) • Weather: Cloudy • Wind: S 9 MPH
- Referee: Jeff Heaser
- TV announcers (ACCN): Chris Cotter (play–by–play), Mark Herzlich (analyst), and Jalyn Johnson (sideline reporter)

Scoring summary
1	9:43	NCSU	C.J. Riley 62 yard pass from Devin Leary (Christopher Dunn Kick) (1 plays, 62 yards, 0:10)	NCSU 7–0
2	13:00	NCSU	Christopher Toudle 8 yard pass from Devin Leary (Christopher Dunn Kick) (6 plays, 67 yards, 2:47)	NCSU 14–0
3	12:11	FSU	Keyshawn Helton 8 yard pass from McKenzie Milton (Ryan Fitzgerald Kick) (7 plays, 51 yards, 2:47)	NCSU 14–7
3	9:46	NCSU	Trent Pennix 45 yard pass from Devin Leary (Christopher Dunn Kick) (5 plays, 65 yards, 2:25)	NCSU 21–7
3	6:29	FSU	Jashaun Corbin 3 yard run (Ryan Fitzgerald Kick) (9 plays, 75 yards, 3:17)	NCSU 21–14
4	7:53	NCSU	Ricky Person Jr. 43 yard pass from Devin Leary (Christopher Dunn Kick) (3 plays, 43 yards, 0:18)	NCSU 28–14

Statistics	NCSU	FSU
First downs	17	18
Total yards	400	271
Rushing yards	86	38
Passing yards	314	233
Turnovers	1	1
Time of possession	34:12	25:48

Team	Category	Player	Statistics
NC State	Passing	Devin Leary	21–32, 314 yards, 4 TD, 1 INT
NC State	Rushing	Zonovan Knight	18 carries, 75 yards
NC State	Receiving	Trent Pennix	3 receptions, 97 yards, 1 TD
Florida State	Passing	McKenzie Milton	22–44, 233 yards, 1 TD, 1 INT
Florida State	Rushing	Jashaun Corbin	14 carries, 33 yards, 1 TD
Florida State	Receiving	Keyshawn Helton	4 receptions, 49 yards, 1 TD

=== At No. 12 Wake Forest ===
No. 16 NC State at No. 12 Wake Forest

Team	1	2	3	4	Total
No. 16 Wolfpack	6	14	7	15	42
• No. 12 Demon Deacons	7	17	7	14	45

- Date: November 13, 2021
- Location: Truist Field at Wake Forest
  Winston-Salem, NC
- Game start: 7:30 p.m. EST
- Elapsed time: 4:14
- Game attendance: 34,503
- Game weather: Temperature: 45 °F (7 °C) • Weather: Clear • Wind: N 5 MPH
- Referee: N. Mullins
- TV announcers (ACCN): Dave O'Brien (play–by–play), Tim Hasselbeck (analyst), and Kelsey Riggs (sideline reporter)

Scoring summary
1	11:25	NCSU	Christopher Dunn 28 yard Field Goal (6 plays, 67 yards, 2:16)	NCSU 3–0
1	7:45	WAKE	A. T. Perry 24 yard pass from Sam Hartman (Nick Sciba Kick) (6 plays, 68 yards, 1:43)	WAKE 7–3
1	2:33	NCSU	Christopher Dunn 46 yard Field Goal (10 plays, 43 yards, 5:12)	WAKE 7–6
2	14:34	WAKE	Justice Ellison 1 yard run (Nick Sciba Kick) (10 plays, 75 yards, 2:59)	WAKE 14–6
2	2:05	WAKE	Sam Hartman 5 yard run (Nick Sciba Kick) (1 play, 5 yards, 0:06)	WAKE 21–6
2	1:47	NCSU	Emeka Emezie 28 yard pass from Devin Leary (Christopher Dunn Kick) (1 play, 28 yards, 0:07)	WAKE 21–13
2	0:28	NCSU	Devin Carter 21 yard pass from Devin Leary (Christopher Dunn Kick) (5 plays, 58 yards, 0:28)	WAKE 21–20
2	0:00	WAKE	Nick Sciba 45 yard Field Goal (3 plays, 22 yards, 0:19)	WAKE 24–20
3	14:47	NCSU	Zonovan Knight 100 yard Kickoff Return (Christopher Dunn Kick)	NCSU 27–24
3	11:07	WAKE	Brandon Chapman 5 yard pass from Sam Hartman (Nick Sciba Kick) (12 plays, 75 yards, 3:40)	WAKE 31–27
4	10:05	WAKE	Justice Ellison 4 yard pass from Sam Hartman (Nick Sciba Kick) (8 plays, 46 yards, 3:29)	WAKE 38–27
4	8:07	NCSU	Emeka Emezie 13 yard pass from Devin Leary (Devin Leary Pass to Emeka Emezie for Two-Point Conversion) (7 plays, 50 yards, 1:58)	WAKE 38–35
4	1:47	WAKE	Justice Ellison 4 yard run (Nick Sciba Kick) (13 plays, 75 yards, 6:20)	WAKE 45–35
4	0:45	NCSU	Devin Carter 8 yard pass from Devin Leary (Christopher Dunn Kick) (10 plays, 75 yards, 1:02)	WAKE 45–42

Statistics	NCSU	WAKE
First downs	25	27
Total yards	482	406
Rushing yards	74	116
Passing yards	408	290
Turnovers	3	3
Time of possession	28:20	31:40

Team	Category	Player	Statistics
NC State	Passing	Devin Leary	37–59, 408 yards, 4 TD, 2 INT
NC State	Rushing	Ricky Person, Jr.	8 carries, 36 yards
NC State	Receiving	Emeka Emezie	10 receptions, 133 yards, 2 TD
Wake Forest	Passing	Sam Hartman	20–47, 290 yards, 3 TD, 3 INT
Wake Forest	Rushing	Justice Ellison	17 carries, 56 yards, 2 TD
Wake Forest	Receiving	A. T. Perry	5 receptions, 73 yards, 1 TD

=== Syracuse ===
Syracuse at No. 20 NC State

Team	1	2	3	4	Total
Orange	0	7	3	7	17
• No. 20 Wolfpack	0	28	10	3	41

- Date: November 20, 2021
- Location: Carter-Finley Stadium
  Raleigh, NC
- Game start: 4:00 p.m. EST
- Elapsed time: 3:08
- Game attendance: 54,083
- Game weather: Temperature: 54 °F (12 °C) • Weather: Sunny • Wind: Calm
- Referee: Jeff Flanagan
- TV announcers (ACCN): Chris Cotter (play–by–play), Mark Herzlich (analyst)

Scoring summary
2	6:14	NCSU	Ricky Person Jr. 15 yard Run (Christopher Dunn Kick) (4 plays, 75 yards, 2:05)	NCSU 7–0
2	5:25	NCSU	Drake Thomas 38 yard Interception Return (Christopher Dunn Kick)	NCSU 14–0
2	3:16	CUSE	Sean Tucker 55 yard Yd Run (Andre Szmyt Kick) (4 plays, 65 yards, 2:09)	NCSU 14–7
2	3:01	NCSU	Zonovan Knight 97 yard Kickoff Return (Christopher Dunn Kick)	NCSU 21–7
2	0:08	NCSU	Christopher Toudle 14 Yd pass from Devin Leary (Christopher Dunn Kick) (5 plays, 80 yards, 0:56)	NCSU 28–7
3	10:46	NCSU	Christopher Dunn 37 yard Field Goal (5 plays, 27 yards, 3:15)	NCSU 31–7
3	6:41	CUSE	Andre Szmyt 45 yard Field Goal (7 plays, 43 yards, 3:58)	NCSU 31–10
3	2:15	NCSU	Thayer Thomas 8 yard pass from Devin Leary (Christopher Dunn Kick) (8 plays, 65 yards, 4:26)	NCSU 38–10
4	8:45	CUSE	Garrett Shrader 48 yard Run (Andre Szmyt Kick) (2 plays, 48 yards, 0:19)	NCSU 38–17
4	3:45	NCSU	Christopher Dunn 21 yard Field Goal (9 plays, 66 yards, 5:00)	NCSU 41–17

Statistics	CUSE	NCSU
First downs	16	19
Total yards	236	399
Rushing yards	170	96
Passing yards	66	303
Turnovers	1	0
Time of possession	29:24	30:36

Team	Category	Player	Statistics
Syracuse	Passing	Garrett Shrader	8–20, 63 yards, 1 INT
Syracuse	Rushing	Sean Tucker	14 carries, 109 yards, 1 TD
Syracuse	Receiving	Devaughn Cooper	3 receptions, 31 yards
NC State	Passing	Devin Leary	17–24, 303 yards, 2 TD
NC State	Rushing	Ricky Person Jr.	12 carries, 50 yards, 1 TD
NC State	Receiving	Thayer Thomas	4 receptions, 80 yards, 1 TD

=== North Carolina ===
North Carolina at No. 20 NC State

Team	1	2	3	4	Total
Tar Heels	0	10	14	6	30
• No. 20 Wolfpack	14	0	7	13	34

- Date: November 26, 2021
- Location: Carter-Finley Stadium
  Raleigh, NC
- Game start: 7:00 p.m. EST
- Elapsed time: 3:34
- Game attendance: 56,919
- Game weather: Temperature: 41 °F (5 °C) • Weather: Cloudy • Wind: Calm
- Referee: Jeff Heaser
- TV announcers (ESPN): Matt Barrie (play–by–play), Roddy Jones (analyst)

Scoring summary
1	13:37	NCSU	C.J. Riley 0 yard return of blocked punt (Christopher Dunn Kick)	NCSU 7−0
1	2:14	NCSU	Trent Pennix 9 yard pass from Devin Leary (Christopher Dunn Kick) (7 plays, 64 yards, 3:48)	NCSU 14−0
2	14:06	UNC	Grayson Atkins 22 yard Field Goal (7 plays, 70 yards, 3:08)	NCSU 14−3
2	2:02	UNC	Sam Howell 4 yard Run (Grayson Atkins Kick) (6 plays, 64 yards, 2:36)	NCSU 14−10
3	9:05	UNC	Sam Howell 12 yard Run (Grayson Atkins Kick) (5 plays, 23 yards, 1:39)	UNC 17−14
3	6:03	UNC	Justin Olson 17 yard pass from Sam Howell (Grayson Atkins Kick) (6 plays, 59 yards, 2:34)	UNC 24−14
3	0:32	NCSU	Thayer Thomas 26 yard pass from Devin Leary (Christopher Dunn Kick) (9 plays, 73 yards, 5:31)	UNC 24−21
4	7:44	UNC	Grayson Atkins 21 yard Field Goal(10 plays, 67 yards, 2:32)	UNC 27−21
4	2:12	UNC	Grayson Atkins 50 yard Field Goal(7 plays, 43 yards, 3:16)	UNC 30−21
4	1:35	NCSU	Emeka Emezie 64 yard pass from Devin Leary (Christopher Dunn Kick)(2 plays, 56 yards, 0:37)	UNC 30−28
4	1:09	NCSU	Emeka Emezie 24 yard pass from Devin Leary (Two-Point Pass Conversion Failed)(3 plays, 54 yards, 0:26)	NCSU 34−30

Statistics	UNC	NCSU
First downs	22	21
Total yards	444	360
Rushing yards	297	113
Passing yards	147	247
Turnovers	1	1
Time of possession	29:21	30:39

Team	Category	Player	Statistics
North Carolina	Passing	Sam Howell	14–26, 147 yards, 1 TD, 1 INT
North Carolina	Rushing	British Brooks	15 carries, 124 yards
North Carolina	Receiving	Josh Downs	8 receptions, 75 yards
NC State	Passing	Devin Leary	19–30, 247 yards, 4 TD
NC State	Rushing	Zonovan Knight	9 carries, 69 yards
NC State	Receiving	Emeka Emezie	5 receptions, 112 yards, 2 TD

== Rankings ==
Ranking movements Legend: ██ Increase in ranking ██ Decrease in ranking — = Not ranked RV = Received votes
	Week															
Poll	Pre	1	2	3	4	5	6	7	8	9	10	11	12	13	14	Final
AP	RV	RV	—	—	23	23	22	18	RV	RV	21	25	24	21	18	20
Coaches	RV	RV	RV	—	RV	22	21	18	25	22	19	24	24	20	18	19
CFP	Not released									19	16	20	20	18	18	Not released

== Players drafted into the NFL ==
Round	Pick	Player	Position	NFL Club
1	6	Ikem Ekwonu	OT	Carolina Panthers
7	255	Trenton Gill	P	Chicago Bears
