= 2021 ACC Championship Game =

2021 Subway ACC Championship Game
- Conference Championship
Pittsburgh Panthers	Wake Forest Demon Deacons
(10–2)	(10–2)
45	21
Head coach: Pat Narduzzi	Head coach: Dave Clawson
AP / Coaches / CFP; 17 / 15 / 15	AP / Coaches / CFP; 18 / 18 / 16
	1	2	3	4	Total
Pittsburgh	14	10	7	14	45
Wake Forest	21	0	0	0	21
- Date: December 4, 2021
- Season: 2021
- Stadium: Bank of America Stadium
- Location: Charlotte, North Carolina
- MVP: Erick Hallett, (FS, Pittsburgh)
- Favorite: Pittsburgh by 3.5
- Referee: Gary Patterson
- Attendance: 57,856

United States TV coverage
- Network: ABC; ESPN Radio
- Announcers: ABC: Mark Jones (play-by-play), Robert Griffin III (analyst) & Quint Kessenich (sideline); ESPN Radio: Marc Kestecher (play-by-play), Ben Hartsock (analyst) & Kelsey Riggs (sideline)

International TV coverage
- Network: ESPN Brazil
- Announcers: Renan do Couto (play-by-play), Antony Curti (analyst)

2021 Atlantic Coast Conference football standings
	Conf.			Overall
Team	W		L	W		L
Atlantic Division
No. 15 Wake Forest xy	7	–	1	11	–	3
No. 20 NC State	6	–	2	9	–	3
No. 14 Clemson	6	–	2	10	–	3
Louisville	4	–	4	6	–	7
Florida State	4	–	4	5	–	7
Boston College	2	–	6	6	–	6
Syracuse	2	–	6	5	–	7
Coastal Division
No. 13 Pittsburgh xy$	7	–	1	11	–	3
Miami (FL)	5	–	3	7	–	5
Virginia Tech	4	–	4	6	–	7
Virginia	4	–	4	6	–	6
North Carolina	3	–	5	6	–	7
Georgia Tech	2	–	6	3	–	9
Duke	0	–	8	3	–	9
Championship: Pittsburgh 45, Wake Forest 21
$ – Conference champion; x – Division champion/co-champions; y – Championship game participant; Rankings from AP Poll

The 2021 ACC Championship Game was a college football game played on December 4, 2021, at Bank of America Stadium in Charlotte, North Carolina. It was the 17th edition of the ACC Championship Game and determined the champion of the Atlantic Coast Conference for the 2021 season. The game began at 8:15 p.m. EST and aired on ABC. The game featured the Wake Forest Demon Deacons, the Atlantic Division champions, and the Pittsburgh Panthers, the Coastal Division champions. Sponsored by restaurant chain Subway, the game was known as the Subway ACC Championship Game.

== Teams ==
The 2021 ACC Championship Game featured the Pittsburgh Panthers, champions of the Coastal Division, and the Wake Forest Demon Deacons, champions of the Atlantic Division. It was only the second all-time meeting between the teams, with Pittsburgh winning the only previous meeting, in 2018, by a score of 34–13. This was each teams' second appearance in the ACC title game; Wake Forest won its lone previous appearance in 2006, while Pittsburgh lost its lone previous appearance in 2018.

This was the first ACC Championship game since 2014 where Clemson did not appear; the Tigers had won each of the previous six championship games. Further, Pittsburgh became the first Coastal Division team to win the ACC Championship since Virginia Tech did it in 2010. Entering the game, the winner of the previous eight ACC Championship Games has gone on to compete in the College Football Playoff; that streak did not continue to include the 2021 champions.

=== Pittsburgh ===
Led by head coach Pat Narduzzi, in his seventh season, the Pittsburgh Panthers opened their 2021 campaign with a rout of UMass at home. The Panthers followed this victory with a road contest against Tennessee; after a slow start, a 27-point second quarter propelled them to a one-touchdown win, 41–34. Pitt's third game of the season saw them face Western Michigan, who scored an upset against the Panthers in a 44–41 win, the first Power Five win they'd achieved under head coach Tim Lester. This was all despite the fact that Pitt quarterback Kenny Pickett succeeded in tying the school's single-game record for passing touchdowns, set by Dan Marino, with six. Narduzzi's squad was able to bounce back the following week, as they "drilled" New Hampshire by ten touchdowns to move to 3–1. A pair of conference games on the road faced the Panthers to open the month of October; they defeated Georgia Tech by a 31-point margin, in a win that was helped by the Pitt defense intercepting Tech quarterback Jeff Sims on each of his first two passes of the game, the second of which was returned for a touchdown. Pitt continued their good form in the following week's game at Virginia Tech, where they won a lower-scoring contest by a margin of three touchdowns. This second win propelled the Panthers into the AP poll for the first time in the season, as they were ranked No. 23 entering their next matchup against defending ACC champions Clemson. Pittsburgh defeated Clemson by ten points, before concluding October with a home game against Miami, who was able to hand Pitt their second loss of the season with a four point win. Pittsburgh was able to respond again, as they got through November with a perfect record following defeats of Duke, North Carolina, Virginia, and Syracuse, sending them to the title game with a 10–2 record. They clinched their spot in the championship game on November 20, after their defeat of Virginia.

=== Wake Forest ===
The Demon Deacons and eighth-year head coach Dave Clawson opened their season with a trio of home games. The first two, both non-conference, saw the Deacons defeat Old Dominion and Norfolk State with relative ease, by margins of 32 and 25 points, respectively. The Demon Deacons opened conference play the following week at home against Florida State, winning the game by three touchdowns. They fared similarly the following Friday evening at Virginia, as Wake defeated the Cavaliers by twenty and, as a result, entered the AP Poll at No. 24 the following week. Wake forest returned home and edged Louisville in a three-point contest. Another three-point game followed, as No. 19 Wake Forest defeated Syracuse on the road in overtime to move to 6–0. To finish the month of October, the Demon Deacons defeated Army in a high scoring 70–56 affair that saw quarterback Sam Hartman set a new Michie Stadium record for single-game passing yards and featured just one punt in its entirety. Wake returned home to conclude the month for their homecoming game against Duke, and defeated the Blue Devils by 38 points to move to 8–0 on the year, marking the best start to a season in school history. The following week, Wake achieved a ranking of No. 9 in the first College Football Playoff rankings to be released, but suffered their season's first loss on the road against North Carolina; though North Carolina is an ACC opponent, the game did not count as a conference game since it was scheduled between the two schools in order to play each other more often than ACC scheduling would otherwise allow. In their home finale, the Demon Deacons earned their first win over a ranked opponent when they defeated No. 16 NC State by a field goal. The Deacons returned to the top ten in time for their matchup with Clemson, though the Tigers defeated Wake in convincing fashion, handing the Demon Deacons their first conference loss of the season. Despite this, Wake Forest secured its spot in the championship game in its final regular season game on November 27, defeating Boston College by a score of 41–10.

== Game summary ==
2021 Subway ACC Championship Game

Quarter	1	2	3	4	Total
No. 15 Pittsburgh	14	10	7	14	45
No. 16 Wake Forest	21	0	0	0	21

at Bank of America Stadium • Charlotte, North Carolina

- Date: December 4, 2021
- Game time: 8:15 p.m. EST
- Game weather: 61 °F (16 °C) • Clear • Wind: 3 mph (4.8 km/h) south
- Game attendance: 57,856
- Referee: Gary Patterson
- TV announcers (ABC): Mark Jones (play-by-play), Robert Griffin III (analyst) & Quint Kessenich (sideline)
- Box score

Game information

First quarter

- 13:42 Pittsburgh – Kenny Pickett 58 yard run (Sam Scarton kick) – 5 plays, 75 yards, 1:18 (Pittsburgh 7–0)
- 10:48 Wake Forest – A. T. Perry 5 yard pass from Sam Hartman (Nick Sciba kick) – 11 plays, 75 yards, 2:54 (tied 7–7)
- 9:37 Pittsburgh – Kenny Pickett pass to Rodney Hammond Jr. for 22 yds (Sam Scarton kick) – 4 plays, 75 yards, 1:11 (Pittsburgh 14–7)
- 6:31 Wake Forest – Sam Hartman run for 11 yards (Nick Sciba kick) – 12 plays, 75 yards, 3:06 (tied 14–14)
- 3:07 Wake Forest – Taylor Morin 26 yard pass from Sam Hartman (Nick Sciba kick) – 4 plays, 69 yards, 1:09 (Wake Forest 21–14)

Second quarter

- 8:21 Pittsburgh – Jared Wayne 4 yard pass from Kenny Pickett (Sam Scarton kick) – 5 plays, 32 yards, 1:21 (tied 21–21)
- 0:00 Pittsburgh – Sam Scarton 41 yard field goal – 5 plays, 57 yards, 0:55 (Pittsburgh 24–21)

Third quarter

- 0:47 Pittsburgh – I. Abanikanda run for 12 yards (Sam Scarton kick) – 4 plays, 45 yards, 1:20 (Pittsburgh 31–21)

Fourth quarter

- 11:57 Pittsburgh – I. Abanikanda run for 1 yard (Sam Scarton kick) – 3 plays, 3 yards, 1:29 (Pittsburgh 38–21)
- 11:42 Pittsburgh – E. Hallett interception return for 19 yards (Sam Scarton kick) (Pittsburgh 45–21)

== Fake slide controversy ==
On the first drive of the game, Pittsburgh quarterback Kenny Pickett scored a touchdown on a 58-yard run to put the Pittsburgh Panthers up 7-0. During the run, around the Demon Deacons' 40-yard line, Pickett dipped his right knee as though he were going to slide and give himself up. Pickett did not slide and continued running for a touchdown.

The "fake slide" was immediately the subject of controversy. In college football, a defensive player who makes contact with a quarterback who is giving themselves up can be subject to a 15-yard unnecessary roughness penalty or possibly ejection. As a result, defensive players usually let up and avoid continuing a play when a quarterback initiates a slide. Pickett acknowledged that his fake slide intentionally took advantage of this, saying, "Yeah, it was intentional. I just kind of started slowing down and pulling up and getting ready to slide. I just kind of saw their body language and they just pulled up as well."

After the game, many acknowledged the play as innovative and clever while simultaneously arguing it was a rules loophole that should be closed. For example, Wake Forest coach Dave Clawson acknowledged there was no rule preventing Pickett from fake sliding and praised such a play as "brilliant" while pointing out that it placed the defense at a huge disadvantage. Former NFL referee Gene Steratore said, "I wish they would implement a change in the rule effective immediately just to get rid of it. Just make it a blown dead play. I’d love to see them do that right now so that they don’t run into another situation like that potentially during the Bowls and the national championship games." He also said, "It’s not in the rulebook. It was never addressed. So give [Pickett] kudos for being an innovative thinker that’s reading a fine line in the rules and finding a way to gain an advantage—legally and by rule—until they change it."

On December 10, 2021, the NCAA Rules Committee published an approved ruling to prohibit future use of a fake slide. The interpretation, informally named by some as the "Kenny Pickett rule," states that "[a]ny time a ball carrier begins, simulates, or fakes a feet-first slide, the ball shall be declared dead by the on field officials at that point." In response, Pickett tweeted, "Changed the game! #H2P". This rule was codified for 2022 during the NCAA Rules Committee meeting in March 2022.

== Statistics ==
=== Team statistics ===
Team statistical comparison
Statistic	Pittsburgh	Wake Forest
First downs	22	24
First downs rushing	8	7
First downs passing	11	13
First downs penalty	3	4
Third down efficiency	4–14	7–19
Fourth down efficiency	0–1	0–1
Total plays–net yards	72–385	85–295
Rushing attempts–net yards	38–112	39–82
Yards per rush	2.9	2.1
Yards passing	273	213
Pass completions–attempts	21–34	24–46
Interceptions thrown	0	4
Punt returns–total yards	1–39	0–0
Kickoff returns–total yards	0–0	2–53
Punts–total yardage	7–264	8–343
Fumbles–lost	3–0	0–0
Penalties–yards	8–70	8–70
Time of possession	31:13	28:06

=== Individual statistics ===
Pittsburgh statistics
Panthers passing
	C–A	Yds	TD	INT
Kenny Pickett	20–33	253	2	0
Jared Wayne	1–1	20	0	0
Panthers rushing
	Car	Yds	TD	Avg
Israel Abanikanda	9	55	2	6.1
Vincent Davis	11	39	0	3.5
Rodney Hammond Jr.	6	22	0	3.7
Kenny Pickett	6	20	1	3.3
Jordan Addison	1	5	0	5.0
Team	5	-29	0	-5.8
Panthers receiving
	Rec	Yds	TD	Avg
Jordan Addison	8	126	0	15.8
Jared Wayne	3	48	1	16
Lucas Krull	2	38	0	19
Rodney Hammond Jr.	3	30	1	10
Jaden Bradley	1	15	0	15
Shocky Jacques-Louis	2	12	0	6
Gavin Bartholomew	1	7	0	7
Israel Abanikanda	1	-3	0	-3

Wake Forest statistics
Demon Deacons passing
	C–A	Yds	TD	INT
Sam Hartman	21–46	213	2	4
Demon Deacons rushing
	Car	Yds	TD	Avg
Christian Turner	6	34	0	5.7
Christian Beal-Smith	10	24	0	2.4
Quinton Cooley	4	11	0	2.8
Ahmani Marshall	3	7	0	2.3
Justice Ellison	4	5	0	1.3
Taylor Morin	1	1	0	1.0
Sam Hartman	11	0	1	0.0
Demon Deacons receiving
	Rec	Yds	TD	Avg
Taylor Morin	4	83	1	20.8
Jaquarii Roberson	9	54	0	6
A. T. Perry	5	54	1	10.8
Ke'Shawn Williams	1	11	0	11
Christian Beal-Smith	1	6	0	6
Quinton Cooley	1	5	0	5
