= 2021 Virginia Cavaliers football team =

American college football season

2021 Virginia Cavaliers football

Fenway Bowl, Canceled vs. SMU
- Conference: Atlantic Coast Conference
- Coastal Division
- Record: 6–6 (4–4 ACC)
- Head coach: Bronco Mendenhall (6th season)
- Offensive coordinator: Robert Anae (6th season)
- Offensive scheme: Multiple
- Defensive coordinator: Nick Howell (6th season)
- Co-defensive coordinator: Kelly Poppinga (4th season)
- Base defense: 3–4
- Home stadium: Scott Stadium

2021 Atlantic Coast Conference football standings
	Conf.			Overall
Team	W		L	W		L
Atlantic Division
No. 15 Wake Forest xy	7	–	1	11	–	3
No. 20 NC State	6	–	2	9	–	3
No. 14 Clemson	6	–	2	10	–	3
Louisville	4	–	4	6	–	7
Florida State	4	–	4	5	–	7
Boston College	2	–	6	6	–	6
Syracuse	2	–	6	5	–	7
Coastal Division
No. 13 Pittsburgh xy$	7	–	1	11	–	3
Miami (FL)	5	–	3	7	–	5
Virginia Tech	4	–	4	6	–	7
Virginia	4	–	4	6	–	6
North Carolina	3	–	5	6	–	7
Georgia Tech	2	–	6	3	–	9
Duke	0	–	8	3	–	9
Championship: Pittsburgh 45, Wake Forest 21
$ – Conference champion; x – Division champion/co-champions; y – Championship game participant; Rankings from AP Poll

The 2021 Virginia Cavaliers football team represented the University of Virginia during the 2021 NCAA Division I FBS football season. The Cavaliers were led by sixth-year head coach Bronco Mendenhall and played their home games at Scott Stadium. The team competed as members of the Atlantic Coast Conference (ACC).

On December 2, Mendenhall announced he would step down as head coach after the bowl game. He also said he had not yet taken a new position, but confirmed that he was not retiring from coaching altogether.

After finishing their regular season with a 6–6 record, the Cavaliers accepted a bid to play in the Fenway Bowl, where they were due to face the SMU Mustangs. On December 26, the Cavaliers withdrew from the game, due to COVID-19 issues; the bowl was subsequently canceled.

== Schedule ==
Date	Time	Opponent	Site	TV	Result	Attendance
September 4	7:30 p.m.	William & Mary*	Scott Stadium; Charlottesville, VA	ACCRSN	W 43–0	42,982
September 11	11:00 a.m.	Illinois*	Scott Stadium; Charlottesville, VA	ACCN	W 42–14	36,036
September 18	7:30 p.m.	at No. 21 North Carolina	Kenan Memorial Stadium; Chapel Hill, NC (South's Oldest Rivalry)	ACCN	L 39–59	50,500
September 24	7:00 p.m.	Wake Forest	Scott Stadium; Charlottesville, VA	ESPN2	L 17–37	38,699
September 30	7:30 p.m.	at Miami (FL)	Hard Rock Stadium; Miami Gardens, FL	ESPN	W 30–28	37,269
October 9	3:00 p.m.	at Louisville	Cardinal Stadium; Louisville, KY	ACCN	W 34–33	40,320
October 16	12:30 p.m.	Duke	Scott Stadium; Charlottesville, VA	ACCRSN	W 48–0	38,489
October 23	7:30 p.m.	Georgia Tech	Scott Stadium; Charlottesville, VA	ACCN	W 48–40	45,837
October 30	10:15 p.m.	at No. 25 BYU*	LaVell Edwards Stadium; Provo, UT	ESPN2	L 49–66	57,685
November 13	7:30 p.m.	No. 9 Notre Dame*	Scott Stadium; Charlottesville, VA	ABC	L 3–28	48,584
November 20	3:30 p.m.	at No. 18 Pittsburgh	Heinz Field; Pittsburgh, PA	ESPN2	L 38–48	45,183
November 27	3:45 p.m.	Virginia Tech	Scott Stadium; Charlottesville, VA (Commonwealth Cup)	ACCN	L 24–29	46,445
~~December 29~~	~~11:00 a.m.~~	vs. ~~SMU~~*	~~Fenway Park~~; ~~Boston, MA~~ (~~Fenway Bowl~~)	~~ESPN~~	Cancelled	_
*Non-conference game; Rankings from AP Poll (and CFP Rankings, after November 2) - Released prior to game; All times are in Eastern time

== Rankings ==
Ranking movements Legend: ██ Increase in ranking ██ Decrease in ranking — = Not ranked RV = Received votes
	Week																	
Poll	Pre	1	2	3	4	5	6	7	8	9	10	11	12	13	14	15	16	Final
AP	—	—	—	—	—	—	RV	RV	RV									
Coaches	—	RV	RV	—	—	—	RV	RV	RV									
CFP	Not released																	Not released

== Coaching staff ==
Name	Position
Bronco Mendenhall	Head coach
Robert Anae	Offensive coordinator, Inside Receivers Coach, Tight Ends
Nick Howell	Defensive coordinator, Secondary Coach
Kelly Poppinga	Co defensive coordinator, linebackers coach
Ricky Brumfield	Special teams coordinator, Cornerbacks coach
Mark Atuaia	Running backs coach
Jason Beck	Quarterbacks coach
Marques Hagans	Wide receivers coach
Shane Hunter	Safeties coach
Clint Sintim	Defensive line
Garett Tujague	Offensive line coach

== Players drafted into the NFL ==
Round	Pick	Player	Position	NFL Club
3	73	Jelani Woods	TE	Indianapolis Colts
