= 2021 Boston College Eagles football team =

American college football season

2021 Boston College Eagles football

Military Bowl, Canceled vs. East Carolina
- Conference: Atlantic Coast Conference
- Atlantic Division
- Record: 6–6 (2–6 ACC)
- Head coach: Jeff Hafley (2nd season)
- Offensive coordinator: Frank Cignetti Jr. (2nd season)
- Offensive scheme: Pro-style
- Defensive coordinator: Tem Lukabu (2nd season)
- Base defense: 4–3
- Home stadium: Alumni Stadium

2021 Atlantic Coast Conference football standings
	Conf.			Overall
Team	W		L	W		L
Atlantic Division
No. 15 Wake Forest xy	7	–	1	11	–	3
No. 20 NC State	6	–	2	9	–	3
No. 14 Clemson	6	–	2	10	–	3
Louisville	4	–	4	6	–	7
Florida State	4	–	4	5	–	7
Boston College	2	–	6	6	–	6
Syracuse	2	–	6	5	–	7
Coastal Division
No. 13 Pittsburgh xy$	7	–	1	11	–	3
Miami (FL)	5	–	3	7	–	5
Virginia Tech	4	–	4	6	–	7
Virginia	4	–	4	6	–	6
North Carolina	3	–	5	6	–	7
Georgia Tech	2	–	6	3	–	9
Duke	0	–	8	3	–	9
Championship: Pittsburgh 45, Wake Forest 21
$ – Conference champion; x – Division champion/co-champions; y – Championship game participant; Rankings from AP Poll

The 2021 Boston College Eagles football team represented Boston College during the 2021 NCAA Division I FBS football season. The Eagles played their home games at Alumni Stadium in Chestnut Hill, Massachusetts, and competed in the Atlantic Coast Conference (ACC). The team was led by second-year head coach Jeff Hafley. It was the first season with fans at Alumni Stadium since 2019.

After finishing their regular season with a 6–6 record, the Eagles accepted a bid to play in the Military Bowl, where they were due to face the East Carolina Pirates. On December 26, the Eagles withdrew from the game, due to COVID-19 issues; the bowl was subsequently canceled.

== Schedule ==
Date	Time	Opponent	Site	TV	Result	Attendance
September 4	12:00 p.m.	Colgate*	Alumni Stadium; Chestnut Hill, MA	ACCN	W 51–0	28,991
September 11	3:30 p.m.	at UMass*	McGuirk Alumni Stadium; Hadley, MA (rivalry)	FloSports/NESN+	W 45–28	12,118
September 18	12:00 p.m.	at Temple*	Lincoln Financial Field; Philadelphia, PA	ESPNU	W 28–3	25,290
September 25	12:00 p.m.	Missouri*	Alumni Stadium; Chestnut Hill, MA	ESPN2	W 41–34 ^{OT}	44,500
October 2	7:30 p.m.	at No. 25 Clemson	Memorial Stadium; Clemson, SC (O'Rourke–McFadden Trophy)	ACCN	L 13–19	79,159
October 16	7:30 p.m.	No. 22 NC State	Alumni Stadium; Chestnut Hill, MA	ACCN	L 7–33	40,349
October 23	4:00 p.m.	at Louisville	Cardinal Stadium; Louisville, KY	ACCN	L 14–28	38,202
October 30	3:30 p.m.	at Syracuse	Carrier Dome; Syracuse, NY	ACCRSN	L 6–21	32,022
November 5	7:30 p.m.	Virginia Tech	Alumni Stadium; Chestnut Hill, MA (rivalry)	ESPN2	W 17–3	35,637
November 13	3:30 p.m.	at Georgia Tech	Bobby Dodd Stadium; Atlanta, GA	ACCRSN	W 41–30	31,511
November 20	12:00 p.m.	Florida State	Alumni Stadium; Chestnut Hill, MA	ACCN	L 23–26	33,363
November 27	12:00 p.m.	No. 18 Wake Forest	Alumni Stadium; Chestnut Hill, MA	ESPN2	L 10–41	25,854
December 27	2:30 p.m.	vs. East Carolina*	Navy–Marine Corps Memorial Stadium; Annapolis, MD (Military Bowl)	ESPN	Cancelled	
*Non-conference game; Rankings from AP Poll released prior to the game; All times are in Eastern time

== Players drafted into the NFL ==
Round	Pick	Player	Position	NFL club
1	17	Zion Johnson	OG	Los Angeles Chargers
