= 2021 Louisville Cardinals football team =

American college football season

2021 Louisville Cardinals football

First Responder Bowl, L 28–31 vs. Air Force
- Conference: Atlantic Coast Conference
- Atlantic Division
- Record: 6–7 (4–4 ACC)
- Head coach: Scott Satterfield (3rd season)
- Offensive scheme: Spread option
- Defensive coordinator: Bryan Brown (3rd season)
- Co-defensive coordinator: Cort Dennison (3rd season)
- Base defense: 4–2–5
- Home stadium: Cardinal Stadium

Uniform
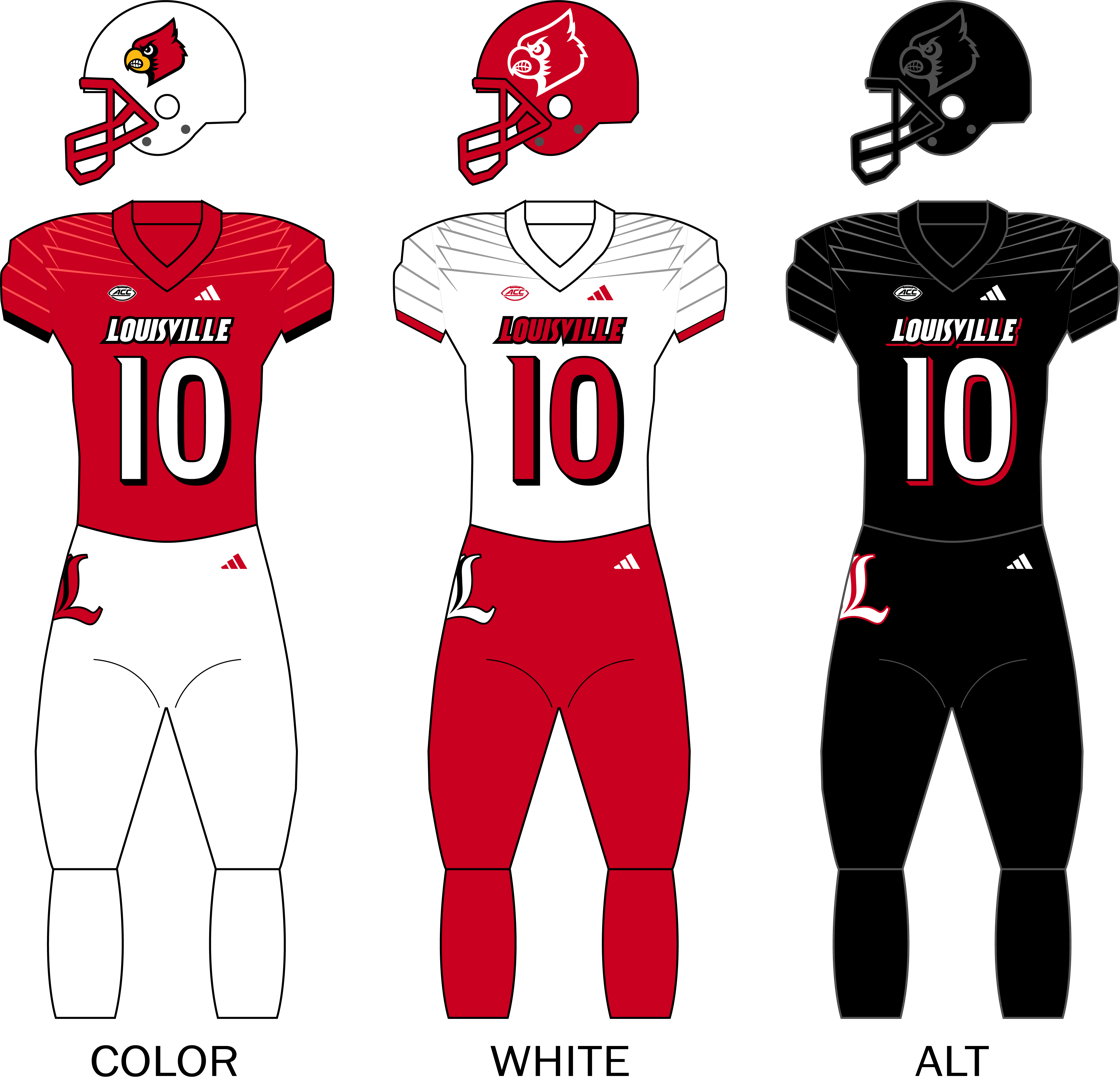

2021 Atlantic Coast Conference football standings
	Conf.			Overall
Team	W		L	W		L
Atlantic Division
No. 15 Wake Forest xy	7	–	1	11	–	3
No. 20 NC State	6	–	2	9	–	3
No. 14 Clemson	6	–	2	10	–	3
Louisville	4	–	4	6	–	7
Florida State	4	–	4	5	–	7
Boston College	2	–	6	6	–	6
Syracuse	2	–	6	5	–	7
Coastal Division
No. 13 Pittsburgh xy$	7	–	1	11	–	3
Miami (FL)	5	–	3	7	–	5
Virginia Tech	4	–	4	6	–	7
Virginia	4	–	4	6	–	6
North Carolina	3	–	5	6	–	7
Georgia Tech	2	–	6	3	–	9
Duke	0	–	8	3	–	9
Championship: Pittsburgh 45, Wake Forest 21
$ – Conference champion; x – Division champion/co-champions; y – Championship game participant; Rankings from AP Poll

The 2021 Louisville Cardinals football team represented the University of Louisville during the 2021 NCAA Division I FBS football season. This was the team's third season under head coach Scott Satterfield. The Cardinals played their home games at Cardinal Stadium in Louisville, Kentucky, and competed as a member of the Atlantic Coast Conference (ACC).

== Schedule ==
Date	Time	Opponent	Site	TV	Result	Attendance
September 6	8:00 p.m.	vs. Ole Miss*	Mercedes-Benz Stadium; Atlanta, GA (Chick-fil-A Kickoff Game)	ESPN	L 24–43	30,709
September 11	7:00 p.m.	Eastern Kentucky*	Cardinal Stadium; Louisville, KY	ACCNX/ESPN+	W 30–3	37,673
September 17	7:30 p.m.	UCF*	Cardinal Stadium; Louisville, KY	ESPN	W 42–35	39,022
September 25	3:30 p.m.	at Florida State	Doak Campbell Stadium; Tallahassee, FL	ESPN2	W 31–23	50,964
October 2	12:30 p.m.	at No. 24 Wake Forest	Truist Field at Wake Forest; Winston-Salem, NC	ACCRSN	L 34–37	29,077
October 9	3:00 p.m.	Virginia	Cardinal Stadium; Louisville, KY	ACCN	L 33–34	40,320
October 23	4:00 p.m.	Boston College	Cardinal Stadium; Louisville, KY	ACCN	W 28–14	38,202
October 30	7:30 p.m.	at NC State	Carter–Finley Stadium; Raleigh, NC	ACCN	L 13–28	53,123
November 6	7:30 p.m.	Clemson	Cardinal Stadium; Louisville, KY	ACCN	L 24–30	51,729
November 13	12:00 p.m.	Syracuse	Cardinal Stadium; Louisville, KY	ACCRSN	W 41–3	43,797
November 18	7:30 p.m.	at Duke	Wallace Wade Stadium; Durham, NC	ESPN	W 62–22	8,493
November 27	7:30 p.m.	Kentucky*	Cardinal Stadium; Louisville, KY (Governor's Cup)	ESPN2	L 21–52	55,018
December 28	3:15 p.m.	vs. Air Force*	Gerald J. Ford Stadium; University Park, TX (First Responder Bowl)	ESPN	L 28–31	15,251
*Non-conference game; Rankings from AP Poll released prior to the game; All times are in Eastern time

== Rankings ==
Ranking movements Legend: ██ Increase in ranking ██ Decrease in ranking — = Not ranked RV = Received votes
	Week																	
Poll	Pre	1	2	3	4	5	6	7	8	9	10	11	12	13	14	15	16	Final
AP	—	—	—	RV	RV	—												
Coaches	—	—	—	—	RV	—												
CFP	Not released																	Not released
