= Ricky Person Jr. =

American football player (born 1999)

Ottawa Redblacks
- Position: Running back
- Roster status: Active
- CFL status: American

Personal information
- Born: November 12, 1999 (age 26); Wake Forest, North Carolina, U.S.
- Listed height: 6 ft 0 in (1.83 m)
- Listed weight: 217 lb (98 kg)

Career information
- High school: Heritage (Wake Forest, North Carolina)
- College: NC State (2018–2021)
- NFL draft: 2022: undrafted

Career history
- Baltimore Ravens (2022)*; Massachusetts Pirates (2023); Birmingham Stallions (2023–2024); Seattle Seahawks (2024)*; Birmingham Stallions (2025); Ottawa Redblacks (2026–present)
- * Offseason or practice squad member only

Awards and highlights
- UFL champion (2024); USFL champion (2023); UFL rushing touchdown leader (2024)
- Stats at Pro Football Reference

Ricky Person Jr. (born November 12, 1999) is an American professional football running back for the Ottawa Redblacks of the Canadian Football League (CFL). He played college football at NC State Wolfpack, and was signed by the Baltimore Ravens as an undrafted free agent in 2022. He has also been a member of the Massachusetts Pirates of the Indoor Football League (IFL) and the Seattle Seahawks of the National Football League (NFL).

== College career ==
Person played college football at NC State from 2018 to 2021, where he played in 40 games, rushing for 1,979 yards, and 14 touchdowns.

=== Statistics ===
| Year | Team | Games | | Rushing | | | | Receiving | | | |
| Year | Team | GP | GS | Att | Yds | Avg | TD | Rec | Yds | Avg | TD |
|---|---|---|---|---|---|---|---|---|---|---|---|
| 2018 | NC State | 9 | 0 | 112 | 471 | 4.2 | 2 | 3 | 7 | 2.3 | 1 |
| 2019 | NC State | 7 | 2 | 61 | 229 | 3.8 | 3 | 8 | 99 | 12.4 | 1 |
| 2020 | NC State | 12 | 12 | 147 | 643 | 4.4 | 4 | 18 | 136 | 7.6 | 0 |
| 2021 | NC State | 12 | 0 | 135 | 636 | 4.7 | 5 | 28 | 240 | 8.6 | 2 |
| Career | | 40 | 14 | 455 | 1,979 | 4.3 | 14 | 57 | 482 | 8.5 | 4 |

== Professional career ==
Pre-draft measurables
| Height | Weight | Arm length | Hand span | 40-yard dash | 10-yard split | 20-yard split | 20-yard shuttle | Three-cone drill | Vertical jump | Broad jump | Bench press |
|---|---|---|---|---|---|---|---|---|---|---|---|
| 6 ft 0 1/2 in (1.84 m) | 215 lb (98 kg) | 32 1/2 in (0.83 m) | 9 3/4 in (0.25 m) | 4.59 s | 1.63 s | 2.70 s | 4.37 s | 7.36 s | 34 in (0.86 m) | 10 ft 2 in (3.10 m) | 13 reps |
All values from Pro Day

=== Baltimore Ravens ===
After going undrafted in the 2022 NFL draft, Person signed with the Baltimore Ravens of the National Football League (NFL) on May 6, 2022.

=== Massachusetts Pirates ===
On March 21, 2023, Person signed with the Massachusetts Pirates of the Indoor Football League (IFL).

=== Birmingham Stallions ===
On May 3, 2023, Person signed with the Birmingham Stallions of the United States Football League (USFL). He had his contract terminated on June 18, 2024, to sign with an NFL team.

=== Seattle Seahawks ===
On June 24, 2024, Person signed with the Seattle Seahawks. He was released with an injury settlement on July 31.

=== Birmingham Stallions (second stint) ===
Person re-signed with the Birmingham Stallions on October 8, 2024.

=== Ottawa Redblacks ===
On September 22, 2026, Person signed with the Ottawa Redblacks of the Canadian Football League (CFL) and was assigned to the practice roster.

== Career statistics ==
Legend
| | Led the league |
| | League champion |
| **Bold** | Career high |

=== Regular season ===
| Year | Team | League | Games | | Rushing | | | | Receiving | | | |
| Year | Team | League | GP | GS | Att | Yds | Avg | TD | Rec | Yds | Avg | TD |
|---|---|---|---|---|---|---|---|---|---|---|---|---|
| 2023 | BHAM | USFL | 4 | 0 | 14 | 83 | 5.9 | 1 | 1 | 0 | 0.0 | 0 |
| 2024 | BHAM | UFL | 9 | 5 | 93 | 297 | 3.2 | 6 | 12 | 122 | 10.2 | 0 |
| 2025 | BHAM | UFL | 8 | 6 | 76 | 310 | 4.1 | 5 | 7 | 35 | 5.0 | 0 |
| Career | | | 21 | 11 | 183 | 690 | 3.8 | 12 | 20 | 157 | 7.9 | 0 |

=== Postseason ===
| Year | Team | League | Games | | Rushing | | | | Receiving | | | |
| Year | Team | League | GP | GS | Att | Yds | Avg | TD | Rec | Yds | Avg | TD |
|---|---|---|---|---|---|---|---|---|---|---|---|---|
| 2023 | BHAM | USFL | 2 | 0 | 16 | 122 | 7.6 | 0 | 1 | 24 | 24.0 | 0 |
| 2024 | BHAM | UFL | 2 | 2 | 18 | 109 | 6.1 | 0 | 3 | 21 | 7.0 | 1 |
| Career | | | 4 | 2 | 34 | 231 | 6.8 | 0 | 4 | 45 | 11.3 | 1 |
