= 2022 Wake Forest Demon Deacons football team =

American college football season

2022 Wake Forest Demon Deacons football

Gasparilla Bowl champion

Gasparilla Bowl, W 27–17 vs. Missouri
- Conference: Atlantic Coast Conference
- Record: 8–5 (3–5 ACC)
- Head coach: Dave Clawson (9th season)
- Offensive coordinator: Warren Ruggiero (9th season)
- Offensive scheme: Slow mesh
- Defensive coordinator: Brad Lambert (4th season)
- Base defense: Multiple 4–2–5
- Home stadium: Truist Field at Wake Forest

2022 Atlantic Coast Conference football standings
	Conf.			Overall
Team	W		L	W		L
Atlantic Division
No. 13 Clemson xy$	8	–	0	11	–	3
No. 11 Florida State	5	–	3	10	–	3
Louisville	4	–	4	8	–	5
NC State	4	–	4	8	–	5
Syracuse	4	–	4	7	–	6
Wake Forest	3	–	5	8	–	5
Boston College	2	–	6	3	–	9
Coastal Division
North Carolina xy	6	–	2	9	–	5
Duke	5	–	3	9	–	4
No. 22 Pittsburgh	5	–	3	9	–	4
Georgia Tech	4	–	4	5	–	7
Miami (FL)	3	–	5	5	–	7
Virginia	1	–	6	3	–	7
Virginia Tech	1	–	6	3	–	8
Championship: Clemson 39, North Carolina 10
$ – Conference champion; x – Division champion/co-champions; y – Championship game participant; Rankings from AP Poll

The 2022 Wake Forest Demon Deacons football team represented Wake Forest University during the 2022 NCAA Division I FBS football season. The Demon Deacons played their home games at Truist Field at Wake Forest in Winston–Salem, North Carolina, and competed as members of the Atlantic Coast Conference. They were led by head coach Dave Clawson, in his ninth season.

== Schedule ==
Wake Forest announced its 2022 football schedule on January 12, 2022. The 2022 schedule would consist of seven home games and five away games in the regular season. The Demon Deacons would host ACC foes Clemson, Boston College, North Carolina, and Syracuse and would travel to Florida State, Louisville, NC State and Duke.

The Demon Deacons would host three of their non-conference opponents, VMI from the Division I FCS, Liberty from the FBS Independents and Army, also from the FBS Independents. They would visit Vanderbilt from the SEC.

Date	Time	Opponent	Rank	Site	TV	Result	Attendance
September 1	7:30 p.m.	VMI*	No. 22	Truist Field at Wake Forest; Winston-Salem, NC	ACCN	W 44–10	26,013
September 10	12:00 p.m.	at Vanderbilt*	No. 23	FirstBank Stadium; Nashville, TN (SEC Nation)	SECN	W 45–25	24,431
September 17	5:00 p.m.	Liberty*^{†}	No. 19	Truist Field at Wake Forest; Winston-Salem, NC	ACCN	W 37–36	32,891
September 24	12:00 p.m.	No. 5 Clemson	No. 21	Truist Field at Wake Forest; Winston-Salem, NC	ABC	L 45–51 ^{2OT}	32,903
October 1	3:30 p.m.	at No. 23 Florida State	No. 22	Doak Campbell Stadium; Tallahassee, FL	ABC	W 31–21	69,749
October 8	7:30 p.m.	Army*	No. 15	Truist Field at Wake Forest; Winston-Salem, NC	ACCRSN	W 45–10	32,524
October 22	3:30 p.m.	Boston College	No. 13	Truist Field at Wake Forest; Winston-Salem, NC	ACCN	W 43–15	28,530
October 29	3:30 p.m.	at Louisville	No. 10	Cardinal Stadium; Louisville, KY	ACCN	L 21–48	39,503
November 5	8:00 p.m.	at No. 22 NC State	No. 21	Carter-Finley Stadium; Raleigh, NC (rivalry)	ACCN	L 21–30	56,919
November 12	7:30 p.m.	No. 15 North Carolina		Truist Field at Wake Forest; Winston-Salem, NC (rivalry)	ESPN2	L 34–36	31,346
November 19	8:00 p.m.	Syracuse		Truist Field at Wake Forest; Winston-Salem, NC	ACCN	W 45–35	26,164
November 26	3:30 p.m.	at Duke		Wallace Wade Stadium; Durham, NC (rivalry)	ACCN	L 31–34	17,492
December 23	6:30 p.m.	vs. Missouri*		Raymond James Stadium; Tampa, FL (Gasparilla Bowl)	ESPN	W 27–17	34,370
*Non-conference game; ^{†}Homecoming; Rankings from AP Poll released prior to the game; All times are in Eastern time

== Game summaries ==
=== VMI ===
	1	2	3	4	Total
Keydets	0	3	7	0	10
No. 22 Demon Deacons	17	6	14	7	44

=== At Vanderbilt ===
	1	2	3	4	Total
No. 23 Demon Deacons	14	7	14	10	45
Commodores	3	7	8	7	25

Statistics

Statistics	WAKE	VAN
First downs	21	11
Total yards	451	294
Rushing yards	151	113
Passing yards	300	181
Turnovers	1	3
Time of possession	30:13	29:47

Team	Category	Player	Statistics
Wake Forest	Passing	Sam Hartman	18/27, 300 yards, 4 TD
Wake Forest	Rushing	Quinton Cooley	9 rushes, 57 yards, TD
Wake Forest	Receiving	A. T. Perry	5 receptions, 142 yards, TD
Vanderbilt	Passing	AJ Swann	8/11, 146 yards, 2 TD
Vanderbilt	Rushing	Ray Davis	18 rushes, 87 yards, TD
Vanderbilt	Receiving	Jayden McGowan	3 receptions, 56 yards

=== Liberty ===
	1	2	3	4	Total
Flames	0	8	15	13	36
No. 19 Demon Deacons	3	17	0	17	37

Statistics

Statistics	LIB	WFU
First downs	22	16
Total yards	427	346
Rushing yards	171	21
Passing yards	256	325
Turnovers	4	2
Time of possession	35:28	24:32

Team	Category	Player	Statistics
Liberty	Passing	Kaidon Salter	19/34, 256 yards, 2 TD, 2 INT
Liberty	Rushing	Dae Dae Hunter	17 rushes, 89 yards, TD
Liberty	Receiving	Demario Douglas	7 receptions, 124 yards, TD
Wake Forest	Passing	Sam Hartman	26/44, 325 yards, 3 TD, 2 INT
Wake Forest	Rushing	Sam Hartman	8 rushes, 11 yards
Wake Forest	Receiving	Ke'Shawn Williams	5 receptions, 129 yards

=== No. 5 Clemson ===
No. 5 Clemson Tigers (3–0) at No. 21 Wake Forest Demon Deacons (3–0) − Game summary

Quarter	1	2	3	4	OT	2OT	Total
No. 5 Clemson	14	6	8	10	7	6	51
No. 21 Wake Forest	7	7	21	3	7	0	45

at Truist Field • Winston-Salem, NC

- Date: September 24, 2022
- Game time: Noon
- Game weather: Temperature: 69 °F (21 °C) • Wind: SW @ 6 mph (9.7 km/h) • Weather: Cloudy
- Game attendance: 32,903
- Referee: Jeff Heaser
- TV announcers (ABC): Sean McDonough (play-by-play), Todd Blackledge (analyst), and Molly McGrath (sideline)

Game information

First quarter

- CLEM – DJ Uiagalelei 12 yard pass to Jake Briningstool, (B. T. Potter PAT), 8:09. Tigers 7–0. Drive: 8 plays, 88 yards, 4:08.
- CLEM – Uiagalelei 41 yard pass to Brannon Spector, (Potter PAT), 5:09. Tigers 14–0. Drive: 5 plays, 75 yards, 2:06.
- WAKE – Sam Hartman 36 yard pass to Jahmal Banks (Matthew Dennis PAT), 4:13. Tigers 14–7. Drive: 3 plays, 75 yards, 00:56.

Second quarter

- CLEM – Potter 24 yard field goal, 7:49. Tigers 17–7. Drive: 10 plays, 58 yards, 5:07.
- WAKE – Hartman 5 yard pass to Banks, (Dennis PAT), 5:49. Tigers 17–14. Drive 4 plays, 68 yards, 1:20.
- CLEM – Potter 38 yard field goal, 00:14. Tigers 20–14. Drive: 15 plays, 51 yards, 5:30.

Third quarter

- WAKE – Hartman 28 yard pass to Donavon Greene, (Dennis PAT), 12:13. Demon Deacons 21–20. Drive: 4 plays, 68 yards, 1:20.
- WAKE – Hartman 19 yard pass to Blake Whiteheart, (Dennis PAT), 7:47. Demon Deacons 28–20. Drive: 7 plays, 70 yards, 2:52.
- CLEM – Uiagalelei 3 yard pass to Davis Allen, (Potter PAT), 4:29. Tied 28–28. Drive: 9 plays, 75 yards, 3:18.
- WAKE – Hartman 25 yard pass to D. Green, (Dennis PAT), 1:19. Demon Deacons 35–28. Drive: 8 plays, 75 yards, 3:10.

Fourth quarter

- CLEM – Will Shipley 1 yard run, (Potter PAT), 11:16. Tied 35–35. Drive: 10 plays, 75 yards, 5:03.
- WAKE – Dennis 29 yard field goal, 8:07. Demon Deacons 38–35. Drive: 7 plays, 64 yards, 3:09.
- CLEM – Potter 52 yard field goal, 4:01. Tied 35–35. Drive: 7 plays, 17 yards, 4:01.

Overtime

- WAKE – Hartman 8 yard pass to A. T. Perry, (Dennis PAT). Demon Deacons 45–38 . Drive: 5 plays, 25 yards.
- CLEM – Uiagaleli 21 yard pass to Beaux Collins, (Potter PAT). Tied 45–45. Drive: 3 plays, 21 yards.

Second Overtime

- CLEM – Uiagaleli 21 yard pass to Allen, (2-point attempt failed). Tigers 51–45. Drive: 3 plays 25 yards.

Top passers

- CLEM – DJ Uiagalelei: 26–41, 317 yards, 5 TDs
- WAKE – Sam Hartman: 20–29, 337 yards, 6 TDs

Top rushers

- CLEM – Will Shipley: 20 rushes, 104 yards, 1 TD
- WAKE – Justice Ellison: 21 rushes, 77 yards

Top Receiving

- CLEM – Joseph Ngata: 4 receptions, 84 yards
- WAKE – Jahmal Banks: 6 receptions, 141 yards, 2 TDs

=== At No. 23 Florida State ===
	1	2	3	4	Total
No. 22 Demon Deacons	7	14	7	3	31
No. 23 Seminoles	7	0	6	8	21

=== Army ===
Army Black Knights at No. 15 Wake Forest Demon Deacons

Quarter	1	2	3	4	Total
Black Knights	0	0	0	10	10
No. 15 Demon Deacons	14	7	17	7	45

at Truist Field at Wake Forest, Winston-Salem, NC

- Date: October 8, 2022
- Game time: 7:30 p.m. EDT
- Game weather: Temperature: 60 °F (16 °C) • Wind: N 5 mph • Weather: Clear
- Game attendance: 32,524
- Referee: Jerry Magallanes
- TV announcers (ACCRSN): Evan Lepler (play-by-play), Brian Jordan (analyst), and Wiley Ballard (sideline)
- ESPN – No. 15 Wake Forest rushes past Army, 45–10 /// Box Score, Army at No. 15 Wake Forest /// Army Pregame Notes /// Wake Forest Pregame Notes /// Postgame Notes

Game information

First quarter

- (08:08) WF TD – Christian Turner 1-yard rush, Matthew Dennis kick
  Drive: 9 plays, 91 yards, 2:40; Wake Forest 7–0
- (02:20) WF TD – Justice Ellison 3-yard rush, Matthew Dennis kick
  Drive: 5 plays, 56 yards, 1:38; Wake Forest 14–0

Second quarter

- (02:37) WF TD – Quinton Cooley 1-yard rush, Matthew Dennis kick
  Drive: 12 plays, 82 yards, 5:04; Wake Forest 21–0

Third quarter

- (13:30) WF TD – Sam Hartman 26-yard pass from A. T. Perry, Matthew Dennis kick
  Drive: 6 plays, 75 yards, 1:30; Wake Forest 28–0
- (05:29) WF TD – Christian Turner 4-yard rush, Matthew Dennis kick
  Drive: 4 plays, 75 yards, 1:19; Wake Forest 35–0
- (02:10) WF FG – Matthew Dennis 38-yard field goal
  Drive: 7 plays, 45 yards, 1:38; Wake Forest 38–0

Fourth quarter

- (13:53) ARMY TD – Isaiah Alston 57-yard pass from Jemel Jones, Quinn Maretzki kick
  Drive: 7 plays, 70 yards, 3:11; Wake Forest 38–7
- (04:21) WF TD – Wesley Grimes 13-yard pass from Mitch Griffis, Zach Murphy kick
  Drive: 8 plays, 41 yards, 4:21; Wake Forest 45–7
- (02:56) ARMY FG – Quinn Maretzki 33-yard field goal
  Drive: 5 plays, 68 yards, 1:20; Wake Forest 45–10

Passing

- ARMY – Jemel Jones: 4/9, 100 yards, 1 TD
- WF – Sam Hartman: 13/19, 246 yards, 1 TD

Rushing

- ARMY – Ay'Juan Marshall: 3 carries, 44 yards
- WF – Justice Ellison: 11 carries, 96 yards, 1 TD

Receiving

- ARMY – Isaiah Alston: 7 receptions, 123 yards, 1 TD
- WF – A. T. Perry: 5 receptions, 118 yards, 1 TD

Defense

- ARMY – Marquel Broughton: 13 total tackles (4 solo, 6 assisted)
- WF – Dylan Hazen: 12 total tackles (3 solo, 9 assisted), 0.5 tackles for loss, 0.5 sacks, 1 interception

Statistics	ARMY	WF
First downs	19	26
3rd down efficiency	8–17	4–9
4th down efficiency	2–4	1–3
Plays–yards	74–407	64–488
Rushes–yards	53–225	42–221
Passing yards	182	267
Passing: Comp–Att–Int	10–21–1	15–22–0
Penalties–yards	6–36	1–5
Turnovers	2	0
Time of possession	35:56	24:04

=== Boston College ===
	1	2	3	4	Total
Eagles	3	6	6	0	15
No. 13 Demon Deacons	7	14	15	7	43

=== At Louisville ===
	1	2	3	4	Total
No. 10 Demon Deacons	0	14	0	7	21
Cardinals	6	7	35	0	48

=== At No. 22 NC State ===
No. 21 Wake Forest at No. 22 NC State

Team	1	2	3	4	Total
No. 21 Demon Deacons	0	14	0	7	21
• No. 22 Wolfpack	3	14	10	3	30

- Date: November 5, 2022
- Location: Carter–Finley Stadium
  Raleigh, NC
- Game start: 8:00 p.m. EDT
- Elapsed time: 3 hours, 27 minutes
- Game attendance: 56,919
- Game weather: 71 °F (22 °C) • Weather: Clear • Wind: SE 8 MPH
- Referee: Jeff Heaser
- TV announcers (ACCN): Dave O'Brien (play–by–play), Tim Hasselbeck (analyst), and Kelsey Riggs (sideline reporter)

Scoring summary
1	8:04	NCSU	Christopher Dunn 33 yard field goal (8 plays, 28 yards, 4:14)	NCSU 3–0
2	10:19	WAKE	Christian Turner 2 yard run (Matthew Dennis kick) (10 plays, 75 yards, 4:00)	WAKE 7–3
2	7:39	NCSU	Keyon Lesane 12 yard pass from MJ Morris (Christopher Dunn kick) (6 plays, 71 yards, 2:30)	NCSU 10–7
2	4:11	WAKE	Taylor Morin 24 yard pass from Sam Hartman (Matthew Dennis kick) (8 plays, 75 yards, 3:28)	WAKE 14–10
2	1:30	NCSU	Darryl Jones 13 yard pass from MJ Morris (Christopher Dunn kick) (8 plays, 64 yards, 2:33)	NCSU 17–14
3	6:14	NCSU	Darryl Jones 1 yard pass from MJ Morris (Christopher Dunn kick) (15 plays, 80 yards, 7:33)	NCSU 24–14
3	2:01	NCSU	Christopher Dunn 51 yard field goal (5 plays, 17 yards, 2:17)	NCSU 27–14
4	6:54	WAKE	A. T. Perry 29 yard pass from Sam Hartman (13 plays, 99 yards, 4:18)	NCSU 27–21
4	2:54	NCSU	Christopher Dunn 25 yard field goal (9 plays, 62 yards, 4:00)	NCSU 30–21

Statistics	WAKE	NCSU
First downs	22	24
Total yards	414	325
Rushing yards	17	115
Passing yards	397	210
Turnovers	3	0
Time of possession	26:38	33:22

Team	Category	Player	Statistics
Wake Forest	Passing	Sam Hartman	29–48, 397 yards, 2 TD, 3 INT
Wake Forest	Rushing	Christian Turner	8 carries, 29 yards, 1 TD
Wake Forest	Receiving	A. T. Perry	12 receptions, 159 yards, 1 TD
NC State	Passing	MJ Morris	18–28, 210 yards, 3 TD
NC State	Rushing	Jordan Houston	12 carries, 53 yards
NC State	Receiving	Thayer Thomas	8 receptions, 79 yards

=== No. 15 North Carolina ===
No. 15 North Carolina at Wake Forest

Team	1	2	3	4	Total
• No. 15 Tar Heels	14	13	6	3	36
Demon Deacons	7	14	13	0	34

- Date: November 12, 2022
- Location: Truist Field at Wake Forest
  Winston-Salem, NC
- Game start: 7:30pm EST
- Game attendance: 31,346
- Referee: Gary Patterson
- TV announcers (ESPN2): Clay Matvick (play-by-play), Rocky Boiman (analyst), and Dawn Davenport (sideline)

Scoring summary
1	9:17	UNC	Josh Downs 12 yd. pass from Drake Maye (Noah Burnette kick) (10 plays, 91 yards, 3:23)	UNC 7–0
1	7:13	UNC	Elijah Green 5 yd. run (Noah Burnette kick) (4 plays, 69 yards, 0:51)	UNC 14–0
1	3:21	WF	Taylor Morin 7 yd. pass from Sam Hartman (Matthew Dennis kick) (11 plays, 78 yards, 3:46)	UNC 14–7
2	13:23	UNC	Josh Downs 7 yd. pass from Drake Maye (Noah Burnette kick) (13 plays, 64 yards, 4:50)	UNC 21–7
2	9:13	WF	Christian Turner 1 yd. run (Matthew Dennis kick) (12 plays, 75 yards, 4:10)	UNC 21–14
2	4:06	WF	Donavon Greene 7 yd. pass from Sam Hartman (Matthew Dennis kick) (5 plays, 36 yards, 1:49)	Tied 21–21
2	2:22	UNC	Josh Downs 20 yd. pass from Drake Maye (Noah Burnette PAT failed) (5 plays, 75 yards, 1:44)	UNC 27–21
3	8:35	WF	A. T. Perry 32 yd. pass from Sam Hartman (Matthew Dennis kick) (9 plays, 73 yards, 3:12)	WF 28–27
3	5:27	UNC	Drake Maye 5 yd. run (Two-Point conversion failed) (10 plays, 69 yards, 3:06)	UNC 33–28
3	4:26	WF	Donavon Greene 60 yd. pass from Sam Hartman (Two-Point conversion failed) (3 plays, 72 yards, 0:52)	WF 34–33
4	2:12	UNC	Noah Burnette 33 yd. field goal (5 plays, 32 yards, 2:08)	UNC 36–34

Statistics	UNC	WF
First downs	30	22
Plays–yards	87–584	72–490
Rushes–yards	38–136	41–170
Passing yards	448	320
Passing: comp–att–int	31–49–0	18–31–1
Turnovers		
Time of possession	33:02	26:58

Team	Category	Player	Statistics
North Carolina	Passing	Drake Maye	31/49, 448 yards, 3 TD
North Carolina	Rushing	Drake Maye	19 carries, 71 yards, TD
North Carolina	Receiving	Josh Downs	11 receptions, 154 yards, 3 TD
Wake Forest	Passing	Sam Hartman	18/31, 320 yards, 4 TD, INT
Wake Forest	Rushing	Justice Ellison	16 carries, 81 yards
Wake Forest	Receiving	Taylor Morin	5 receptions, 106 yards, TD

=== Syracuse ===
	1	2	3	4	Total
Orange	7	14	0	14	35
Demon Deacons	3	21	7	14	45

=== At Duke ===
	1	2	3	4	Total
Demon Deacons	7	10	7	7	31
Blue Devils	3	17	7	7	34

=== Vs. Missouri (Gasparilla Bowl) ===
	1	2	3	4	Total
Tigers	3	7	7	0	17
Demon Deacons	7	7	6	7	27

== Rankings ==
Ranking movements Legend: ██ Increase in ranking ██ Decrease in ranking — = Not ranked RV = Received votes т = Tied with team above or below
	Week															
Poll	Pre	1	2	3	4	5	6	7	8	9	10	11	12	13	14	Final
AP	22	23	19	21	22	15	14	13	10T	20	RV	—	—	—	—	—
Coaches	19	21	18	16	21	15	14	13	10	19	RV	RV	RV	RV	—	RV
CFP	Not released									21	—	—	—	—	—	Not released

== Coaching staff ==
Position	Name	First Year at Wake
Head coach	Dave Clawson	2014
Asst head coach / Receivers	Kevin Higgins	2014
AHC Defense/defensive line	Dave Cohen	2014
Offensive coordinator / quarterbacks	Warren Ruggiero	2014
Defensive coordinator	Brad Lambert	2022
Special teams coordinator / tight ends	Wayne Lineburg	2017
Assistant coach / Safeties	James Adams	2022
Running backs	John Hunter	2014
Offensive Line	Nick Tabacca	2014
Cornerbacks	Paul Williams	2020
Linebackers	Glenn Spencer	2022
