= 2021 Wake Forest Demon Deacons football team =

American college football season

2021 Wake Forest Demon Deacons football

ACC Atlantic Division champion Gator Bowl champion

ACC Championship Game, L 21–45 vs. Pittsburgh

Gator Bowl, W 38–10 vs. Rutgers
- Conference: Atlantic Coast Conference
- Atlantic Division

Ranking
- Coaches: No. 14
- AP: No. 15
- Record: 11–3 (7–1 ACC)
- Head coach: Dave Clawson (8th season)
- Offensive coordinator: Warren Ruggiero (8th season)
- Offensive scheme: Slow mesh
- Defensive coordinator: Lyle Hemphill (3rd season)
- Base defense: 4–3
- Home stadium: Truist Field at Wake Forest

2021 Atlantic Coast Conference football standings
	Conf.			Overall
Team	W		L	W		L
Atlantic Division
No. 15 Wake Forest xy	7	–	1	11	–	3
No. 20 NC State	6	–	2	9	–	3
No. 14 Clemson	6	–	2	10	–	3
Louisville	4	–	4	6	–	7
Florida State	4	–	4	5	–	7
Boston College	2	–	6	6	–	6
Syracuse	2	–	6	5	–	7
Coastal Division
No. 13 Pittsburgh xy$	7	–	1	11	–	3
Miami (FL)	5	–	3	7	–	5
Virginia Tech	4	–	4	6	–	7
Virginia	4	–	4	6	–	6
North Carolina	3	–	5	6	–	7
Georgia Tech	2	–	6	3	–	9
Duke	0	–	8	3	–	9
Championship: Pittsburgh 45, Wake Forest 21
$ – Conference champion; x – Division champion/co-champions; y – Championship game participant; Rankings from AP Poll

The 2021 Wake Forest Demon Deacons football team represented Wake Forest University during the 2021 NCAA Division I FBS football season. The team was led by eighth-year head coach Dave Clawson, and played their home games at Truist Field at Wake Forest in Winston-Salem, North Carolina, competing in the Atlantic Coast Conference (ACC). The Demon Deacons clinched the Atlantic Division for the first time since 2006 and appeared in the ACC Championship game against Pittsburgh.

== Preseason ==
=== ACC poll ===
The ACC media days were held on July 26, 2021. In the conference preseason polls, the Demon Deacons were predicted to finish in fifth place in the Atlantic Division.

Atlantic
Predicted finish	Team	Votes (1st place)
1	Clemson	1,028 (146)
2	NC State	804 (1)
3	Boston College	638
4	Florida State	510
5	Wake Forest	472
6	Louisville	462
7	Syracuse	202

== Schedule ==
Date	Time	Opponent	Rank	Site	TV	Result	Attendance
September 3	7:00 p.m.	Old Dominion*		Truist Field at Wake Forest; Winston-Salem, NC	ACCN	W 42–10	25,673
September 11	12:00 p.m.	Norfolk State*		Truist Field at Wake Forest; Winston-Salem, NC	ACCNX/ESPN+	W 41–16	21,896
September 18	3:30 p.m.	Florida State		Truist Field at Wake Forest; Winston-Salem, NC	ESPN	W 35–14	29,564
September 24	7:00 p.m.	at Virginia		Scott Stadium; Charlottesville, VA	ESPN2	W 37–17	38,699
October 2	12:30 p.m.	Louisville	No. 24	Truist Field at Wake Forest; Winston-Salem, NC	ACCRSN	W 37–34	29,077
October 9	3:30 p.m.	at Syracuse	No. 19	Carrier Dome; Syracuse, NY	ESPN2	W 40–37 ^{OT}	38,554
October 23	12:00 p.m.	at Army*	No. 16	Michie Stadium; West Point, NY	CBSSN	W 70–56	38,019
October 30	4:00 p.m.	Duke^{†}	No. 13	Truist Field at Wake Forest; Winston-Salem, NC (rivalry)	ACCN	W 45–7	31,613
November 6	12:00 p.m.	at North Carolina*	No. 9	Kenan Memorial Stadium; Chapel Hill, NC (rivalry)	ABC	L 55–58	50,500
November 13	7:30 p.m.	No. 16 NC State	No. 12	Truist Field at Wake Forest; Winston-Salem, NC (rivalry)	ACCN	W 45–42	34,503
November 20	12:00 p.m.	at Clemson	No. 10	Memorial Stadium; Clemson, SC	ESPN	L 27–48	81,048
November 27	12:00 p.m.	at Boston College	No. 18	Alumni Stadium; Chestnut Hill, MA	ESPN2	W 41–10	25,854
December 4	8:00 p.m.	vs. No. 15 Pittsburgh	No. 16	Bank of America Stadium; Charlotte, NC (ACC Championship Game)	ABC	L 21–45	57,856
December 31	12:00 p.m.	vs. Rutgers*	No. 17	TIAA Bank Field; Jacksonville, FL (Gator Bowl)	ESPN	W 38–10	28,508
*Non-conference game; ^{†}Homecoming; Rankings from AP Poll (and CFP Rankings, after November 2) - Released prior to game; All times are in Eastern time

The game against North Carolina, a fellow member of the Atlantic Coast Conference, was played as a non-conference game and did not count in the league standings. This was done because the two rivals otherwise only play once every six years due to conference divisional alignment.

== Coaching staff ==
Position	Name	First Year at Wake
Head coach	Dave Clawson	2014
Asst head coach / Receivers	Kevin Higgins	2014
AHC Defense/defensive line	Dave Cohen	2014
Offensive coordinator / quarterbacks	Warren Ruggiero	2014
Defensive coordinator / Safeties	Lyle Hemphill	2017
Special teams coordinator / tight ends	Wayne Lineburg	2017
Assistant special teams coordinator / Nickelbacks	Ryan Crawford	2018
Running backs	John Hunter	2014
Offensive Line	Nick Tabacca	2014
Cornerbacks	Paul Williams	2020
Linebackers	Greg Jones	2016
Special teams analyst	LaTroy Lewis	2021

== Roster ==
2021 Wake Forest Demon Deacons football team roster
Players
Coaches
Offense

Pos.	#	Name	Class
RB	0	Christian Turner	So
WR	2	Donald Stewart	Sr
WR	5	Jaquarii Roberson	Jr
WR	7	Donovan Greene	Fr
WR	9	A. T. Perry	So
QB	10	Sam Hartman	So
QB	11	Santino Marucci	Fr
QB	12	Mitch Griffis	Fr
WR	13	Ke'Shawn Williams	Fr
RB	14	Justice Ellison	Fr
QB	15	Michael Kern	Fr
QB	17	Leo Kelly	Fr
QB	18	Billy Edwards Jr.	Fr
TE	20	Cameron Hite	Fr
TE	23	Brandon Chapman	Sr
WR	24	Dez Williams	Fr
WR	25	Horatio Fields	Fr
RB	28	Quinton Cooley	Fr
WR	29	Christian Greene	Fr
WR	32	Jarrett Brown	Fr
WR	34	Walker Ferguson	Fr
RB	37	Will Towns	Fr
WR	38	Nick Ragano	Fr
WR	39	Zavier Simpson	Fr
TE	40	Gavin Ellis	Fr
RB	42	Zach Igwebe	Fr
TE	44	Ryan Dupont	Fr
OL	50	Zach Tom	Jr
OL	52	Spencer Clapp	Jr
OL	53	Je'Vionte' Nash	Sr
OL	54	Matt Gulbin	Fr
OL	55	Michael Jurgens	So
OL	59	Loic Ngassam Nya	Jr
OL	60	Hampton Tanner	Fr
OL	62	DeVonte Gordon	Fr
OL	63	Jack Pascual	Fr
OL	67	Trey Turner	So
OL	68	Thomas Grippo	Fr
OL	70	Nick Sharpe	Fr
OL	71	C. J. Elmonus	Fr
OL	72	Erik Russell	Fr
OL	73	Zach Vaughan	Fr
OL	74	Luke Petitbon	Fr
OL	75	Terrance Davis	Sr
OL	76	Jaydon Collins	Fr
OL	77	George Sell	Fr
OL	78	Christian Forbes	Fr
OL	79	Sean Maginn	Jr
WR	80	Jahmal Banks	Fr
TE	82	Trey Boll	Fr
WR	83	Taylor Morin	Fr
WR	84	Jackson Hensley	Fr
TE	85	Blake Whiteheart	So
TE	86	Michael Frogge	Fr
WR	87	Teddy Centofanti	So
WR	88	Andy Elkins Jr.	Fr
TE	89	Alec Rowan	So

Defense

Pos.	#	Name	Class
DB	0	Tyriq Hardimon	Jr
DL	1	Sulaiman Kamara	Sr
DL	2	Luiji Vilain	GS
DB	3	Nasir Greer	Jr
DE	4	Jacorey Johns	So
LB	5	Ryan Smenda Jr.	Jr
DB	6	Ja'Sir Taylor	Sr
DL	7	Tyler Williams	Jr
DB	8	Isaiah Wingfield	GS
DB	9	Chelen Garnes	So
DB	10	DaShawn Jones	Fr
DL	11	Miles Fox	Sr
LB	12	Luke Masterson	Sr
LB	15	Jaylen Hudson	Fr
DB	17	Traveon Redd	Sr
DB	18	K. J. Trujillo	So
DB	20	Coby Davis	So
LB	21	Chase Jones	So
DB	22	A. J. Williams	Fr
DB	23	Jarret Alston Jr.	Fr
DB	24	Gavin Holmes	Fr
DB	25	J.J. Roberts	Fr
LB	26	Quincy Bryant	Fr
DB	27	Malik Mustapha	Fr
DB	28	Zion Keith	So
DB	29	Caelen Carson	Fr
DL	30	Jasheen Davis	Fr
DB	32	Evan Slocum	Fr
LB	34	Zach Ranson	Fr
DL	35	Kendron Wayman	Fr
DB	36	Annuj Shah	Jr
DB	37	Christian Masterson	Fr
DB	38	Trent Nicholson	Fr
DL	39	Royce Francis	So
DL	40	Rondell Bothroyd	So
DB	41	John Peterson III	Fr
DL	43	B. J. Williams	Fr
DL	44	Justin Williams	Fr
DB	45	Nick Anderson	Fr
DB	48	Alex Murphey	Jr
DB	49	Cody Cater	Fr
LB	50	Dylan Hazen	Fr
DL	51	Will Smart	Fr
LB	55	Max Miller	Fr
LB	56	Mark Balbis	Fr
LB	57	Joshua Sosanya	Fr
LB	58	Chase Monroe	Jr
DL	59	Jonathan Saklad	Fr
DB	80	Justin Simpkins	Fr
DB	81	Anthony Borriello	Fr
DB	84	Troy Hoilman	Fr
DB	89	Luke Terrell	Fr
DL	91	Kevin Pointer	Fr
DL	92	Bernard Gooden	Fr
DL	93	Isaiah Chaney	Fr
DL	94	Zach Lohavichan	Fr
DL	95	Dion Bergan Jr.	Jr
DL	96	Claude Bragg	Fr
DL	98	Wyatt Crespi	Fr

Special teams

Pos.	#	Name	Class
K	4	Nick Sciba	Jr
P, K	36	Ivan Mora	Fr
LS	54	Will Cobb	Fr
P, K	88	Jack Murphy	Jr
LS	90	Jacob Zhur	Fr
K	99	Matthew Dennis	Fr

Head coach

- Dave Clawson

Coordinators/assistant coaches

Legend

- (C) Team captain
- (S) Suspended
- (I) Ineligible
- Injured
- Redshirt

Roster

== Game summaries ==
=== Old Dominion ===
	1	2	3	4	Total
Monarchs	3	0	0	7	10
Demon Deacons	14	14	7	7	42

Statistics

Statistics	ODU	WAKE
First downs	17	20
Total yards	272	352
Rushing yards	145	164
Passing yards	127	188
Turnovers	2	1
Time of possession	32:19	27:41

Team	Category	Player	Statistics
Old Dominion	Passing	Hayden Wolff	11/17, 88 yards, TD
Old Dominion	Rushing	Elijah Davis	12 rushes, 69 yards
Old Dominion	Receiving	Stone Smartt	3 receptions, 26 yards
Wake Forest	Passing	Sam Hartman	18/27, 188 yards, 3 TD
Wake Forest	Rushing	Christian Beal-Smith	11 rushes, 74 yards, 2 TD
Wake Forest	Receiving	A. T. Perry	4 receptions, 81 yards, TD

=== Norfolk State ===
	1	2	3	4	Total
Spartans	3	6	0	7	16
Demon Deacons	7	17	17	0	41

Statistics

Statistics	NORF	WAKE
First downs	19	22
Total yards	336	413
Rushing yards	141	161
Passing yards	195	252
Turnovers	1	1
Time of possession	38:39	21:21

Team	Category	Player	Statistics
Norfolk State	Passing	Juwan Carter	19/31, 195 yards, 2 TD, INT
Norfolk State	Rushing	J. J. Davis	6 rushes, 42 yards
Norfolk State	Receiving	Justin Smith	5 receptions, 66 yards
Wake Forest	Passing	Sam Hartman	17/25, 244 yards, TD
Wake Forest	Rushing	Christian Beal-Smith	9 rushes, 60 yards, TD
Wake Forest	Receiving	Jaquarii Roberson	4 receptions, 97 yards, TD

=== Florida State ===
	1	2	3	4	Total
Seminoles	7	7	0	0	14
Demon Deacons	14	13	8	0	35

Statistics

Statistics	FSU	WAKE
First downs	16	27
Total yards	317	484
Rushing yards	91	225
Passing yards	226	259
Turnovers	6	2
Time of possession	20:47	39:13

Team	Category	Player	Statistics
Florida State	Passing	McKenzie Milton	11/16, 119 yards, 2 INT
Florida State	Rushing	Treshaun Ward	6 rushes, 48 yards
Florida State	Receiving	Ontaria Wilson	3 receptions, 91 yards, TD
Wake Forest	Passing	Sam Hartman	22/31, 259 yards, 2 TD, INT
Wake Forest	Rushing	Christian Beal-Smith	19 rushes, 95 yards, TD
Wake Forest	Receiving	A. T. Perry	7 receptions, 155 yards, TD

=== At Virginia ===
	1	2	3	4	Total
Demon Deacons	10	10	14	3	37
Cavaliers	0	3	14	0	17

Statistics

Statistics	WAKE	UVA
First downs	24	31
Total yards	473	506
Rushing yards	203	99
Passing yards	270	407
Turnovers	0	2
Time of possession	29:27	30:33

Team	Category	Player	Statistics
Wake Forest	Passing	Sam Hartman	17/29, 270 yards, 3 TD
Wake Forest	Rushing	Justice Ellison	13 rushes, 86 yards, TD
Wake Forest	Receiving	Jaquarii Roberson	4 receptions, 91 yards
Virginia	Passing	Brennan Armstrong	33/59, 407 yards, 2 TD, INT
Virginia	Rushing	Mike Hollins	6 rushes, 36 yards
Virginia	Receiving	Dontayvion Wicks	8 receptions, 114 yards, TD

=== Louisville ===
	1	2	3	4	Total
Cardinals	10	7	0	17	34
No. 24 Demon Deacons	10	10	7	10	37

Statistics

Statistics	LOU	WAKE
First downs	25	26
Total yards	517	501
Rushing yards	208	177
Passing yards	309	324
Turnovers	2	1
Time of possession	34:36	25:24

Team	Category	Player	Statistics
Louisville	Passing	Malik Cunningham	19/26, 309 yards, 2 TD
Louisville	Rushing	Jalen Mitchell	17 rushes, 89 yards
Louisville	Receiving	Tyler Harrell	1 reception, 75 yards, TD
Wake Forest	Passing	Sam Hartman	23/40, 324 yards, 2 TD, INT
Wake Forest	Rushing	Justice Ellison	15 rushes, 67 yards, TD
Wake Forest	Receiving	Jaquarii Roberson	6 receptions, 135 yards

=== At Syracuse ===
	1	2	3	4	OT	Total
No. 19 Demon Deacons	3	14	9	8	6	40
Orange	7	14	6	7	3	37

Statistics

Statistics	WAKE	SYR
First downs	21	33
Total yards	426	514
Rushing yards	96	354
Passing yards	330	160
Turnovers	1	1
Time of possession	26:10	33:50

Team	Category	Player	Statistics
Wake Forest	Passing	Sam Hartman	19/32, 330 yards, 3 TD, INT
Wake Forest	Rushing	Christian Beal-Smith	17 rushes, 63 yards, TD
Wake Forest	Receiving	A. T. Perry	3 receptions, 137 yards, 3 TD
Syracuse	Passing	Garrett Shrader	15/27, 160 yards, 2 TD
Syracuse	Rushing	Garret Shrader	29 rushes, 178 yards, TD
Syracuse	Receiving	Courtney Jackson	5 receptions, 64 yards

=== At Army ===
	1	2	3	4	Total
No. 16 Demon Deacons	14	14	21	21	70
Black Knights	7	14	14	21	56

Statistics

Statistics	WAKE	ARMY
First downs	22	31
Total yards	638	595
Rushing yards	180	416
Passing yards	458	179
Turnovers	0	2
Time of possession	17:17	42:43

Team	Category	Player	Statistics
Wake Forest	Passing	Sam Hartman	23/29, 458 yards, 5 TD
Wake Forest	Rushing	Christian Beal-Smith	8 rushes, 71 yards, TD
Wake Forest	Receiving	Jaquarii Roberson	8 receptions, 157 yards, 3 TD
Army	Passing	Jabari Laws	9/11, 140 yards, 3 TD
Army	Rushing	Tyhier Tyler	15 rushes, 104 yards, TD
Army	Receiving	Isaiah Alston	6 receptions, 107 yards, 2 TD

=== Duke ===
	1	2	3	4	Total
Blue Devils	0	0	0	7	7
No. 13 Demon Deacons	14	14	10	7	45

Statistics

Statistics	DUKE	WAKE
First downs	12	29
Total yards	315	677
Rushing yards	160	266
Passing yards	155	411
Turnovers	1	1
Time of possession	23:55	36:05

Team	Category	Player	Statistics
Duke	Passing	Gunnar Holmberg	10/18, 110 yards
Duke	Rushing	Mataeo Durant	20 rushes, 103 yards
Duke	Receiving	Jalon Calhoun	3 receptions, 50 yards
Wake Forest	Passing	Sam Hartman	24/37, 402 yards, 3 TD
Wake Forest	Rushing	Christian Turner	10 rushes, 75 yards
Wake Forest	Receiving	A.T. Perry	7 receptions, 116 yards

=== At North Carolina ===
	1	2	3	4	Total
No. 9 Demon Deacons	10	21	17	7	55
Tar Heels	14	10	10	24	58

Statistics

Statistics	WAKE	UNC
First downs	35	31
Total yards	615	546
Rushing yards	217	330
Passing yards	398	216
Turnovers	2	1
Time of possession	26:27	33:33

Team	Category	Player	Statistics
Wake Forest	Passing	Sam Hartman	25/51, 398 yards, 5 TD, 2 INT
Wake Forest	Rushing	Justice Ellison	13 carries, 81 yards
Wake Forest	Receiving	Jaquarii Roberson	7 receptions, 111 yards, 2 TD
North Carolina	Passing	Sam Howell	16/26, 216 yards, TD
North Carolina	Rushing	Ty Chandler	22 carries, 213 yards, 4 TD
North Carolina	Receiving	Antoine Green	6 receptions, 83 yards, TD

=== No. 16 NC State ===
	1	2	3	4	Total
No. 16 Wolfpack	6	14	7	15	42
No. 12 Demon Deacons	7	17	7	14	45

Statistics

Statistics	NCST	WAKE
First downs	25	27
Total yards	482	406
Rushing yards	74	116
Passing yards	408	290
Turnovers	3	3
Time of possession	28:20	31:40

Team	Category	Player	Statistics
NC State	Passing	Devin Leary	37/59, 408 yards, 4 TD, 2 INT
NC State	Rushing	Ricky Person Jr.	8 rushes, 40 yards
NC State	Receiving	Emeka Emezie	10 receptions, 133 yards, 2 TD
Wake Forest	Passing	Sam Hartman	20/47, 290 yards, 3 TD, 3 INT
Wake Forest	Rushing	Justice Ellison	17 rushes, 57 yards, 2 TD
Wake Forest	Receiving	A. T. Perry	5 receptions, 73 yards, TD

=== At Clemson ===
	1	2	3	4	Total
No. 10 Demon Deacons	0	10	3	14	27
Tigers	10	7	21	10	48

Statistics

Statistics	WAKE	CLEM
First downs	24	25
Total yards	406	543
Rushing yards	36	333
Passing yards	370	210
Turnovers	3	3
Time of possession	26:08	33:52

Team	Category	Player	Statistics
Wake Forest	Passing	Sam Hartman	27/43, 312 yards, TD, INT
Wake Forest	Rushing	Quinton Cooley	8 rushes, 41 yards, TD
Wake Forest	Receiving	A. T. Perry	5 reception, 113 yards
Clemson	Passing	DJ Uiagalelei	11/19, 208 yards, 1 TD, 1 INT
Clemson	Rushing	Kobe Pace	24 rushes, 191 yards, 2 TD
Clemson	Receiving	Beaux Collins	4 reception, 137 yards, TD

=== At Boston College ===
	1	2	3	4	Total
No. 18 Demon Deacons	14	10	10	7	41
Eagles	7	3	0	0	10

Statistics

Statistics	WAKE	BC
First downs	25	9
Total yards	413	182
Rushing yards	177	163
Passing yards	236	19
Turnovers	1	3
Time of possession	36:13	23:47

Team	Category	Player	Statistics
Wake Forest	Passing	Sam Hartman	20/32, 236 yards, 3 TD, INT
Wake Forest	Rushing	Christian Turner	18 rushes, 54 yards, TD
Wake Forest	Receiving	A. T. Perry	4 receptions, 81 yards, 2 TD
Boston College	Passing	Phil Jurkovec	3/11, 19 yards, TD, 2 INT
Boston College	Rushing	Phil Jurkovec	11 rushes, 85 yards
Boston College	Receiving	Trae Berry	1 reception, 15 yards, TD

== Rankings ==
Ranking movements Legend: ██ Increase in ranking ██ Decrease in ranking — = Not ranked RV = Received votes
	Week															
Poll	Pre	1	2	3	4	5	6	7	8	9	10	11	12	13	14	Final
AP	—	—	—	RV	24	19	16	16	13	10	13	13	21	18	20	15
Coaches	—	—	—	RV	25	20	16	15	13	9	13	12	21	18	19	14
CFP	Not released									9	12	10	18	16	17	Not released

== Players drafted into the NFL ==
Round	Pick	Player	Position	NFL Club
4	140	Zach Tom	OG	Green Bay Packers
6	214	Ja'Sir Taylor	CB	Los Angeles Chargers
