= Dave Clawson =

American football player and coach (born 1967)

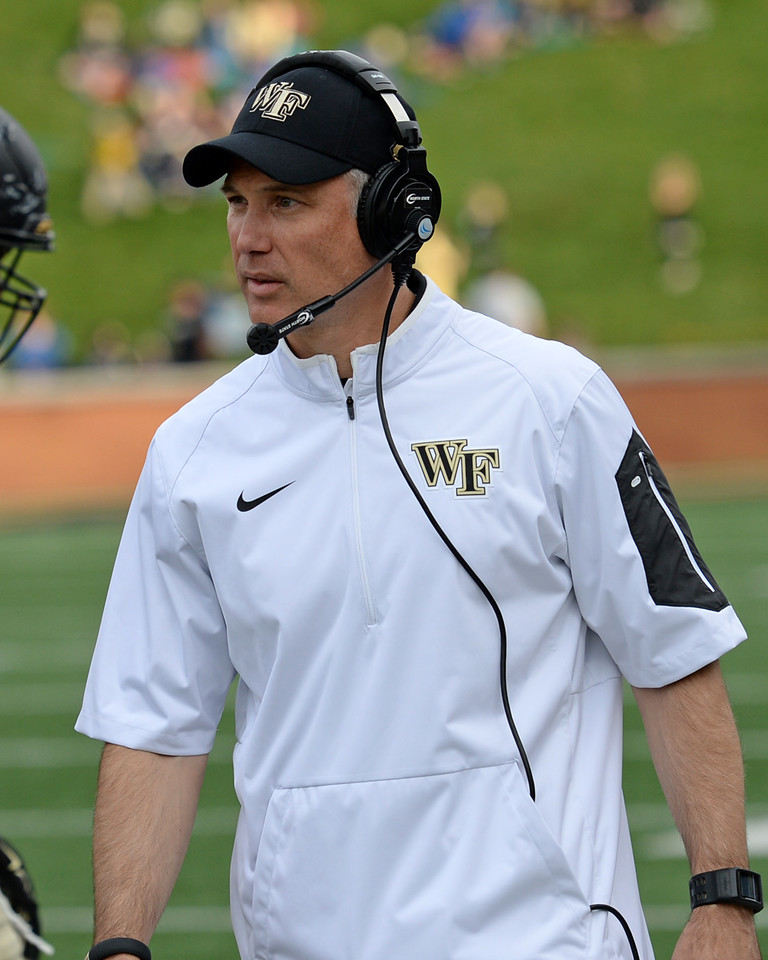
- Clawson coaching Wake Forest in 2015

Biographical details
- Born: August 16, 1967 (age 59); Youngstown, New York, U.S.

Playing career
- 1985–1988: Williams
- Position: Defensive back

Coaching career (HC unless noted)
- 1989–1990: Albany (GA)
- 1991: Buffalo (DB)
- 1992: Buffalo (QB/RB)
- 1993: Lehigh (RB)
- 1994–1995: Lehigh (OC)
- 1996–1998: Villanova (OC)
- 1999–2003: Fordham
- 2004–2007: Richmond
- 2008: Tennessee (OC)
- 2009–2013: Bowling Green
- 2014–2024: Wake Forest

Head coaching record
- Overall: 157–149
- Bowls: 5–4
- Tournaments: 4–3 (NCAA D-I playoffs)

Accomplishments and honors

Championships
- 1 Patriot (2002); 1 A-10 (2005); 1 CAA (2007); 1 MAC (2013); 1 MAC East Division (2013); 1 ACC Atlantic Division (2021)

Awards
- ACC Coach of the Year (2021)

David Paul Clawson (born August 16, 1967) is an American retired college football coach and former player. He last served as the head football coach at Wake Forest University, where he was named the 2021 ACC Coach of the Year. Clawson previously served as the head football coach at Fordham University from 1999 to 2003, at the University of Richmond from 2004 to 2007, and at Bowling Green State University from 2009 to 2013. He retired from coaching in 2024.

He serves as an ACC Network analyst and special advisor to Wake Forest Athletic Director John Currie.

== Coaching career ==
=== Early career ===
Clawson grew up in Youngstown, New York and is a 1985 graduate of Lewiston-Porter High School. After graduating from Williams College, Clawson got his start in coaching as the quarterbacks and running backs coach at the University at Albany in 1989. He was a graduate assistant at UAlbany again in 1990, this time coaching the defensive secondary before earning a master's degree from the university in liberal studies. He later went on to coach as an assistant at the University at Buffalo, Lehigh University, and Villanova University.

=== Fordham ===
Clawson got his first head coaching position at Fordham University. Although his first squad finished with 0 wins in 11 games, he gradually built the Rams into a contender, with his fourth season (2002) being his best. That year, he led them to a Patriot League title, their first conference title since 1988. Winning the conference meant that they were invited to the Division I-AA Playoffs, their first postseason appearance in over 60 years. The Rams beat Northeastern in the first round before losing to Villanova in the quarterfinals. His final record as a head coach at Fordham was 29–29.

=== Richmond ===
After Fordham, Clawson became the head coach at the University of Richmond. He served as coach from the 2004 season until the end of the 2007 season, and was the 32nd football coach at the school. His career coaching record at Richmond was 29–20. This ranks him seventh at Richmond in total wins and fifth at Richmond in winning percentage.

At Richmond, he was awarded Football Championship Subdivision (formerly Division I-AA) Coach of the Year twice. Clawson is credited with re-energizing the Richmond program. After going 3–8 in 2004, the Spiders went 9–4 to win the Atlantic 10 Conference and made the playoffs the following year. In 2007, Richmond won their conference again, going 11–3 before eventually losing in the semifinals to eventual champion Appalachian State.

=== Tennessee ===
On January 11, 2008, it was announced that Clawson had been hired as the new offensive coordinator for the Tennessee Volunteers football team by head coach Phillip Fulmer. He replaced David Cutcliffe, who moved to Duke University as head coach. Clawson's stay in Knoxville was short and disappointing. Fulmer was forced to resign as head coach with three games left in the 2008 season. Incoming head coach Lane Kiffin relieved Clawson of his duties on December 1, 2008. With Clawson as their offensive coordinator, Tennessee suffered its worst statistical offensive season in over 30 years.

=== Bowling Green ===
Clawson was hired as the head football coach at Bowling Green State University on December 12, 2008, just 12 days after being let go by Tennessee. Clawson replaced Gregg Brandon, who was let go after six seasons and a 6–6 record in 2008.

Clawson's era at BGSU started off proving he would be a disciplinarian as he dismissed senior defensive lineman Michael Ream for an undisclosed violation of team rules just months into his tenure. His first game as coach of Bowling Green came on September 3, with a win at home against Sun Belt opponent Troy.

He coached his first bowl, the 2009 Humanitarian Bowl, on December 30 in Boise, Idaho. After scoring to make the lead 42–35 over the Vandals, the Vandals took over with 33 seconds left in the game. Idaho then connected on a long pass down inside the 20 and scored a touchdown to make it 42–41 with 00:04 left. The Vandals went for a gutsy two-point conversion and were successful, sealing a 43–42 and ruining Clawson's first bid at a bowl game.

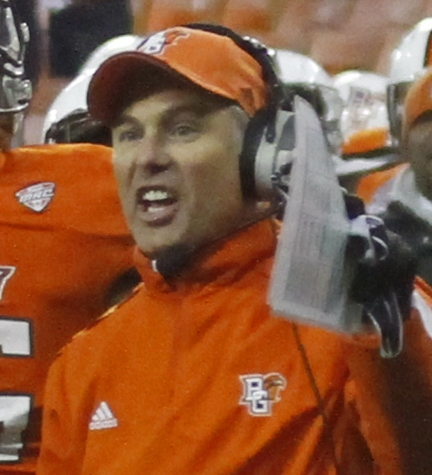
Clawson at the 2012 Military Bowl

On November 7, 2012, he led the Falcons to an upset victory against division rival Ohio Bobcats 26–14. With the win, the team moved into second place in the MAC East Division, where they remained for the rest of the season.

The 2013 season was Clawson's last and most successful season at Bowling Green. His Falcons posted a 10–3 record, including an 8–1 conference record. On December 6, 2013, Clawson led his team to its first MAC Championship since 1992 with a 47–27 victory over the formerly undefeated and ranked #15 Northern Illinois Huskies in the MAC Championship Game which ruined the Huskies' chances of receiving a BCS bowl bid.

=== Wake Forest ===
Clawson was named head football coach at Wake Forest University on December 10, 2013.

==== 2016 ====
After posting 3-9 (1-7 ACC) seasons in 2014 and 2015, Clawson's 2016 team started the season by winning five of its first six games including road victories at Duke and Indiana. He led Wake Forest to its first bowl win in eight years, beating then No. 23 Temple 34–26 in the Military Bowl.

==== 2017 ====
Wake Forest concluded the 2017 season with a 55–52 victory over Texas A&M in a Belk Bowl shootout at Bank of America Stadium. In the highest scoring game in program history, the Demon Deacons (8-5) edged the Aggies (7-6) in a contest that featured over 100 total points and 1,200 yards of total offense.

==== 2018 ====
The Wake Forest Demon Deacons closed out the season with a thrilling 37–34 victory over the Memphis Tigers on Saturday in the 2018 Birmingham Bowl at Legion Field in Birmingham, Alabama.

Wake Forest improved to 7-6 for their third straight winning season after seven consecutive losing campaigns. The Deacs, who were led by quarterback Jamie Newman's four total touchdowns, are winners of three bowl games in a row after coming out on top in the Military Bowl (2016) and Belk Bowl (2017).

==== 2019 ====
In 2019, the Deacons were led by quarterback Jamie Newman, wide receiver Sage Surratt, linebacker Justin Strnad, and defensive end Carlos Basham. The Deacs started off hot going 5–0 to start the season with wins over in state foe North Carolina and against the Eagles in Boston. They were able to reach AP Top 25 status for the first time in over 10 years. After injuries sustained to veterans Strnad, Scotty Washington, Luke Masterson and Sage Surratt, Wake Forest's Orange bowl hopes came to a grinding halt. Wake was able to beat in-state foe Duke to become Big Four Champions, meaning they earned victories against all three of the other power-five ACC schools in North Carolina: NC State, UNC, and Duke. The season ended in a 27–20 loss in the Pinstripe Bowl against Michigan State, where the Deacs added on to the injured list Nasir Greer, and Rondell Bothroyd. What looked to be a very promising season was tarnished by injuries. Despite the injuries the Deacs still finished 8–5 overall, and finished 3rd in the Atlantic division.

==== 2020 ====
Along with many other programs across college football, the Demon Deacons' 2020 season was largely affected by the world's continued battle against the COVID-19 pandemic. After opening the season with losses against ACC foes Clemson, which was the opening College GameDay game of the 2020 season, and NC State, the Demon Deacons went on a 4-game winning streak with wins against Campbell, Virginia, Virginia Tech, and Syracuse. The next week, the Demon Deacons lost to UNC 59–53, in a wild shootout where the Demon Deacons had led 45–24 in the third quarter. Following the UNC game, due to cancellations due to COVID-19, the Demon Deacons did not play again for a month when they lost what ended up being their regular season finale to Louisville, 45–21. Over the course of the season, the Demon Deacons had games against Notre Dame (scheduled to be played in Charlotte as the Duke's Mayo Classic), Duke, and Florida State all cancelled due to COVID-19 health and safety protocols.

Following a 4–4 regular season, the Demon Deacons were selected for the Duke's Mayo Bowl against the Wisconsin Badgers. The Demon Deacons lost this game 42-28 and finished the 2020 season 4–5 overall, and finished 10th in a combined ACC standings.

==== 2021 ====
Following a disappointing 2020 season affected by injuries and COVID-19, expectations were high for the Demon Deacons entering the 2021 season with many returning starters including stars Sam Hartman, Jaquarii Roberson, A.T. Perry, Miles Fox, Luke Masterson, Traveon Redd, and more. Led by the emergence of Sam Hartman as a Heisman contender and a veteran roster, the Demon Deacons started off the 2021 season 8–0, with key ACC wins over Florida State, Virginia, Louisville, Syracuse, and Duke. The Demon Deacons also defeated the Army Black Knights in West Point in a game in which they scored 70 points and had over 630 yards of offense. Nationally after climbing into the top 10 of the Associated Press and Amway Coaches Poll in 2021, Wake Forest achieved its highest ranking in the College Football Playoff Poll in school history when the first ranking was released on Nov. 2, 2021, as the Demon Deacons were tabbed as the No. 9 that week according to the CFP selection committee. After losing a hard-fought road game to UNC 59–53, the Demon Deacons responded and defeated No. 16 ranked NC State in Winston-Salem 45–42 to move to 9–1 on the season. Following a loss against Clemson, the Demon Deacons defeated Boston College 41–10 to clinch the ACC Atlantic Division and secure a place in the ACC Championship Game against Pittsburgh, where they would eventually lose 45–21 to the Panthers. Despite the loss, the Demon Deacons reached 10 regular season wins for just the second time in program history. After reaching a program record sixth-straight bowl game in 2021 and defeating Big Ten foe Rutgers in the 77th annual TaxSlayer Gator Bowl, 38–10, inside TIAA Bank Field in Jacksonville, Wake Forest has the second-longest bowl streak in the ACC, trailing just Clemson, and Clawson owns the school record for bowl victories with four (2016 Military Bowl, 2017 Belk Bowl, 2018 Birmingham Bowl, 2021 Gator Bowl). Wake Forest ended the season ranked No. 15 in the Associated Press Poll and No. 14 in the Coaches Poll, which marks the highest ranking to end a season in program history.

After leading the Deacs to a program-record tying 11–3 record, including a school-best 7–1 mark in ACC play, Clawson was named the 2021 ACC Coach of the Year by the ACC and the Associated Press. This marks the ninth time a Wake Forest head coach has been honored as the ACC Football Coach of the Year and the first since 2006. Clawson was the seventh Wake Forest head coach to win the award. Others who won the award were Jim Grobe (2006), Bill Dooley (1992 and 1987), John Mackovic (1979), Cal Stoll (1970), William Tate (1964) and Paul Amen (1959 and 1955).

Clawson, who was named as an American Football Coaches Association Board of Trustee member on Jan. 10, 2022, signed a multi-year contract extension with Wake Forest on Nov. 26, 2021 ahead of the Demon Deacons winning the 2021 Atlantic Coast Conference Atlantic Division title and the 2021 TaxSlayer Gator Bowl Championship. He has re-built the Deacons using a philosophy of strong recruiting classes, redshirting as many freshmen as possible, and having a strong strength and conditioning program. Clawson and offensive coordinator Warren Ruggiero have engineered an offense that has rewritten the record books at Wake Forest. The Deacons have set over 350 school records including marks for points scored, points per game, total offensive yards, first downs and passing yards over the past five seasons. Also, the Deacons are the only football program in the ACC to average at least 30 points per game each year since 2017. Specifically in 2021, Wake Forest scored a program-best 574 points and averaged a school-record 41.0 points per game.

==== 2022 ====
The Deacs won eight games in a season for just the 10th time in the 115-year history of the program. Four of the 10 eight-win seasons have come in the Dave Clawson era (40 percent).

The Gasparilla Bowl victory over Missouri marked Wake Forest's first ever win over Missouri. Additionally, the Deacs moved to 3–0 against SEC opponents in the Clawson era. With the win over Missouri on Friday and a victory in Week 2 at Vanderbilt, Wake Forest defeated two programs from the Southeastern Conference this fall for the first time since 2008, and just the second time in program history the Deacs accomplished this feat in a single season.

Sam Hartman was named the Most Valuable Player of the 2022 Union Home Mortgage Gasparilla Bowl. Hartman earned his second-straight bowl game MVP honor, as he garnered the accolade following his standout performance against Rutgers in the TaxSlayer Gator Bowl in 2021. Hartman became the first player in program history to earn two bowl game MVPs in their career at Wake Forest.

The 2022 Union Home Mortgage Gasparilla Bowl marked Wake Forest's seventh-straight bowl appearance, a new school record. Additionally, the Demon Deacons’ streak is the second-longest active streak in the Atlantic Coast Conference and the 12th longest in the nation.

Wake Forest finished the 2022 season averaging 36.1 points per game, helping the Deacs post its sixth consecutive season of averaging 30 or more points a game. This is the longest active streak and the fourth longest in ACC history. Wake Forest threw for a team-record 43 touchdowns as a team.

Hartman completed 270-of-428 passes (63.1%) for 3,701 yards and 38 touchdowns and was named the ACC's Brian Piccolo Award Winner. Hartman broke the Wake Forest all-time passing mark against Liberty in Week 3, eclipsing Riley Skinner (2006–09). Additionally, he became the ACC career leader in passing touchdowns (110) in the Gasparilla Bowl vs. Mizzou.

Another record holder is Perry, as he ended his Wake Forest career with a program record 28 touchdown receptions.

Sam Hartman and A.T. Perry finished their Wake Forest careers as one of the top QB-WR duos in conference history. The pair has combined for 27 touchdowns, which is tied for the second most in ACC history.

Ryan Smenda Jr., who Clawson named as a captain prior to the season, had a career-high 117 tackles in 2022 and it marked the most in a single season by a Demon Deacon since 2006. He finished his career ranked eighth all-time in program history (355).

At Wake Forest, his annual salary was $3.6 million.

== Post-coaching career ==
On December 16, 2024, Clawson resigned after 11 seasons as Wake Forest's head coach. He cited NIL limitations and roster retention challenges in part for his decision. Clawson stayed with the school, moving into a fundraising role as special advisor to Athletic Director John Currie.

In 2025, Clawson joined the ACC Network as a studio analyst. The following season, he moved to the broadcast booth, paired with play-by-play broadcaster Roxy Bernstein.

== Head coaching record ==
Year	Team	Overall	Conference	Standing	Bowl/playoffs	Coaches^{#}	TSN/AP^{°}
Fordham Rams (Patriot League) (1999–2003)
1999	Fordham	0–11	0–6	7th			
2000	Fordham	3–8	1–5	6th			
2001	Fordham	7–4	5–2	3rd			
2002	Fordham	10–3	6–1	T–1st	L NCAA Division I-AA Quarterfinal		12
2003	Fordham	9–3	4–3	T–3rd			
Fordham:		29–29	16–17				
Richmond Spiders (Atlantic 10 Conference) (2004–2006)
2004	Richmond	3–8	1–7	5th (South)			
2005	Richmond	9–4	7–1	1st (South)	L NCAA Division I-AA Quarterfinal		8
2006	Richmond	6–5	3–5	T–4th (South)			
Richmond Spiders (Colonial Athletic Association) (2007)
2007	Richmond	11–3	7–1	1st (South)	L NCAA Division I Semifinal	4	5
Richmond:		29–20	18–14				
Bowling Green Falcons (Mid-American Conference) (2009–2013)
2009	Bowling Green	7–6	6–2	3rd (East)	L Humanitarian		
2010	Bowling Green	2–10	1–7	T–5th (East)			
2011	Bowling Green	5–7	3–5	T–4th (East)			
2012	Bowling Green	8–5	6–2	2nd (East)	L Military		
2013	Bowling Green	10–3	7–1	1st (East)	Little Caesars*		
Bowling Green:		32–31	23–17	*Did not coach in bowl game			
Wake Forest Demon Deacons (Atlantic Coast Conference) (2014–2024)
2014	Wake Forest	3–9	1–7	T–6th (Atlantic)			
2015	Wake Forest	3–9	1–7	6th (Atlantic)			
2016	Wake Forest	7–6	3–5	T–4th (Atlantic)	W Military		
2017	Wake Forest	8–5	4–4	T–3rd (Atlantic)	W Belk		
2018	Wake Forest	7–6	3–5	T–5th (Atlantic)	W Birmingham		
2019	Wake Forest	8–5	4–4	T–3rd (Atlantic)	L Pinstripe		
2020	Wake Forest	4–5	3–4	10th	L Duke's Mayo		
2021	Wake Forest	11–3	7–1	1st (Atlantic)	W Gator	14	15
2022	Wake Forest	8–5	3–5	6th (Atlantic)	W Gasparilla		
2023	Wake Forest	4–8	1–7	14th			
2024	Wake Forest	4–8	2–6	T–14th			
Wake Forest:		67–69	32–55				
Total:		157–149					
National championship Conference title Conference division title or championship game berth
