= Jaquarii Roberson =

American football player (born 1998)

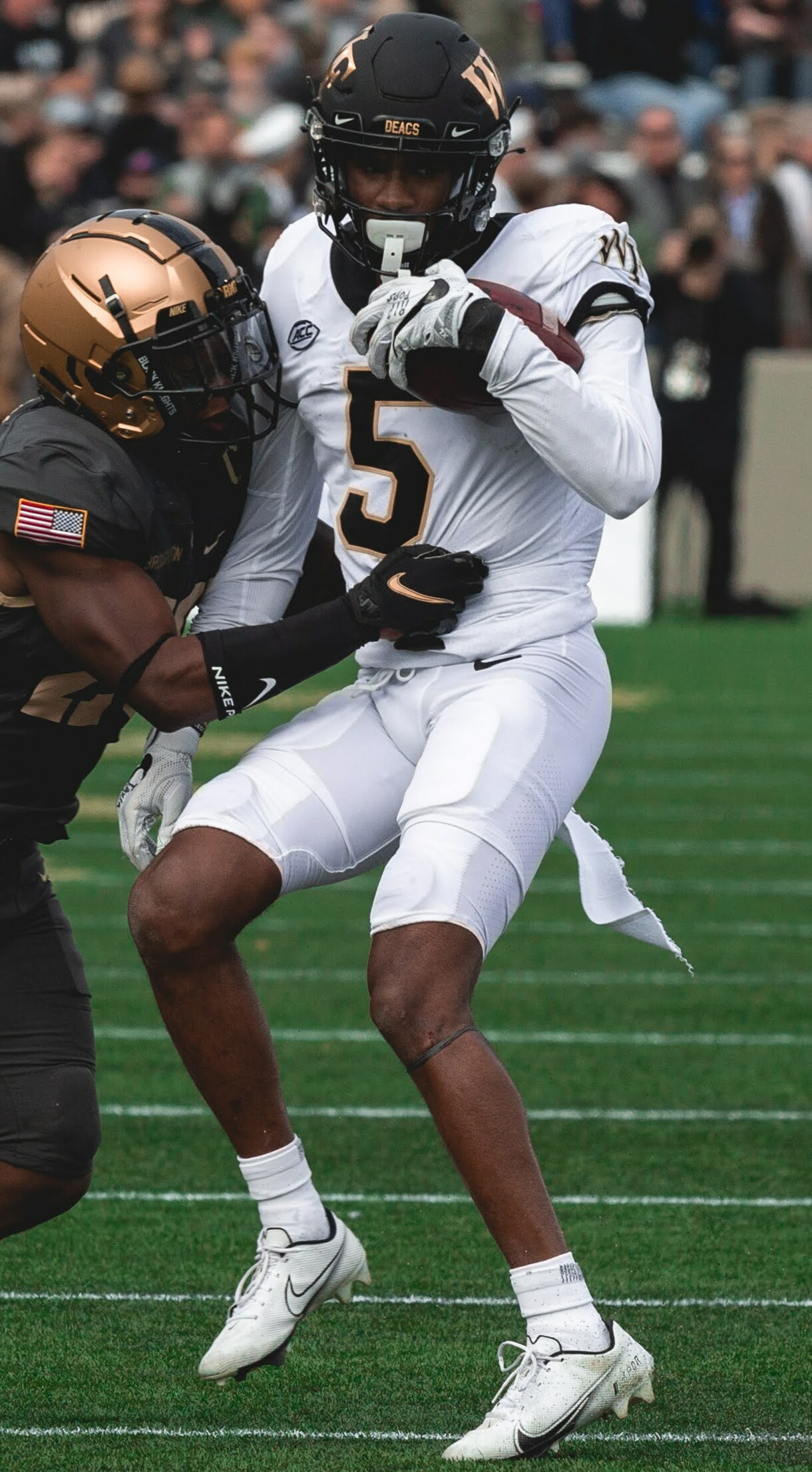
- Roberson with the Wake Forest Demon Deacons in 2021

Profile
- Position: Wide receiver

Personal information
- Born: July 28, 1998 (age 28); Murfreesboro, North Carolina, U.S.
- Listed height: 6 ft 1 in (1.85 m)
- Listed weight: 182 lb (83 kg)

Career information
- High school: Hertford County (Ahoskie, North Carolina)
- College: Wake Forest (2017–2021)
- NFL draft: 2022: undrafted

Career history
- Dallas Cowboys (2022)*; Pittsburgh Steelers (2022)*; Buffalo Bills (2022)*; Los Angeles Rams (2022)*; Houston Roughnecks (2023); BC Lions (2023); Calgary Stampeders (2024)*
- * Offseason or practice squad member only

Awards and highlights
- 2× Second-team All-ACC (2020, 2021)
- Stats at Pro Football Reference

Jaquarii Roberson (born July 28, 1998) is an American professional football wide receiver. He played college football at Wake Forest and signed with the Dallas Cowboys as an undrafted free agent in 2022. Roberson holds the single-season record for receiving yards per game (102.9) at Wake Forest.

== Early life ==
Roberson was born in Murfreesboro, North Carolina, to Satoya Powell and the late Paul N. Roberson Jr. He attended Hertford County High School in Ahoskie, North Carolina, where he played football as a wide receiver. In his junior year, he broke school records, with 66 receptions for 1,480 yards and 19 touchdowns. The following year, he amassed 76 receptions for 1,370 yards and 15 touchdowns in his senior year. He was named to the NCPreps 2A All-State team his senior year and All-Northeastern Coastal 2A Conference as a junior and senior. In basketball, he was named All-District his sophomore and junior years.

Roberson was a consensus three-star wide receiver out of high school, listed as a top 50 player in the state by 247Sports. He had offers from East Carolina, NC State, and Old Dominion, but ultimately decided to play at Wake Forest under head coach Dave Clawson.

College recruiting
Name	Hometown	School	Height	Weight	Commit date
Jaquarii Roberson; Wide receiver	Ahoskie, NC	Hertford County High School	6 ft 3 in (1.91 m)	170 lb (77 kg)	Aug 1, 2016
Jaquarii Roberson; Wide receiver	Recruit ratings: Rivals: 247Sports: ESPN: (73)				
Overall recruit ranking: 247Sports: 193 (WR), 1393 overall ESPN: 188 (WR)
Note: In many cases, Scout, Rivals, 247Sports, On3, and ESPN may conflict in their listings of height and weight.; In these cases, the average was taken. ESPN grades are on a 100-point scale.; Sources: "2017 Wake Forest Commitment List". Rivals. Archived from the original on January 30, 2017.; "2017 Wake Forest class". ESPN. Archived from the original on August 12, 2016.; "2017 Team Ranking". Rivals.com.; "Wake Forest 2017 Football Commits". 247Sports. Archived from the original on October 16, 2017.

== College career ==
=== Freshman year ===
Roberson enrolled at Wake Forest in June 2017. He redshirted his freshman year, seeing no on-field action. Roberson was named scout team player of the week following the team's week 10 victory over Syracuse.

=== Sophomore year ===
Roberson entered the 2018 season as a redshirt freshman. He saw his first collegiate action in the Demon Deacons' week 5 win over Rice, logging 2 catches for 2 yards. In the Birmingham Bowl vs Memphis, Roberson earned his first start, gaining 15 yards on 2 receptions. He ended the season totaling 4 catches for 74 yards.

=== Junior year ===
Coming into the 2019 season, Roberson was nursing an injury that kept him off the depth chart in week 1. In his first start of the season vs Elon in week 4, he caught his first career collegiate touchdown while getting a then career-high 60 yards on 3 catches. He finished the season with 6 receptions with 80 yards and a TD.

=== Senior year ===
In his redshirt junior year, Roberson broke out as the team's starting slot receiver. He accumulated 92 yards on 4 receptions in the Demon Deacons' first game of the season vs top-ranked Clemson. Roberson had his first 100-yard game in a week 7 win over Virginia, racking up a team-high 126 yards on 7 catches. In the team's final four games of the season, he had over 100 yards in each game, tied for the longest streak in Wake Forest history. During the stretch, he amassed 36 receptions for 566 yards and 7 TDs. Roberson tallied up 62 receptions for 926 yards and 8 TDs in the team's 9 games. His 102.9 receiving yards per game is the most in a single season in Demon Deacons history and most in the ACC that year. Pro Football Focus had Roberson graded as the nation's second-best receiver behind Heisman Trophy winner Devonta Smith with a 92.6 grade. His efforts garnered a spot on the second-team All-ACC roster.

=== Final year ===
Because of the COVID-19 pandemic, every player from the 2020 season earned an extra year of eligibility, keeping Roberson as a redshirt junior. Before the season, Roberson gained national attention for his all-conference efforts. He was picked to be on the preseason first-team All-ACC team and the 2021 Biletnikoff Award and Maxwell Award watch lists. In the week 1 win over Old Dominion, Roberson had 6 catches for 46 yards and a TD. He had his best game of the season in the week 8 win over Army, recording 8 receptions for a season-high 157 yards and 3 TDs. Wake Forest won the ACC Atlantic Division for the first time since 2006, playing in the 2021 ACC Championship Game against 15-ranked Pittsburgh in what would be Roberson's final game as a Demon Deacon. He had 9 catches for 54 yards in a 45–21 loss. A few days before the team's appearance in the TaxSlayer Gator Bowl, Roberson announced that he would not play in the game in order to start preparing for the 2022 NFL draft, citing a minor knee surgery as the reason why. Roberson finished the season with 71 receptions for 1,078 yards, both career-highs, and 8 TDs. For the second season in a row, Roberson was named second-team All-ACC. In his collegiate career, he totaled 146 receptions for 2,158 yards and 17 TDs.

Roberson accepted an invitation to the 2022 East-West Shrine Bowl to showcase his skills before the draft, but did not end up playing.

=== Statistics ===
Season	Team	Conf	Receiving			
Season	Team	Conf	Rec	Yards	Avg	TD
2018	Wake Forest	3	7	74	10.6	0
2019	Wake Forest	4	6	80	13.3	1
2020	Wake Forest	9	62	926	14.9	8
2021	Wake Forest	13	71	1,078	15.2	8
College totals		29	146	2,158	14.8	17

== Professional career ==
Pre-draft measurables
Height	Weight	Arm length	Hand span	40-yard dash	10-yard split	20-yard split	20-yard shuttle	Three-cone drill	Vertical jump	Broad jump
6 ft 0 7/8 in (1.85 m)	186 lb (84 kg)	32 in (0.81 m)	9 1/8 in (0.23 m)	4.43 s	1.60 s	2.59 s	4.19 s	6.88 s	40 in (1.02 m)	10 ft 11 in (3.33 m)
All values from Pro Day

=== Dallas Cowboys ===
Roberson signed with the Dallas Cowboys as an undrafted free agent on April 30, 2022, shortly after the 2022 NFL Draft. He was waived on August 23, 2022.

=== Pittsburgh Steelers ===
On September 7, 2022, Roberson signed with the Pittsburgh Steelers practice squad. He was released on October 4.

=== Buffalo Bills ===
On October 5, Roberson signed with the Buffalo Bills practice squad. He was released on October 11.

=== Los Angeles Rams ===
On November 30, 2022, Roberson signed with the practice squad of the Los Angeles Rams. He signed a reserve/futures contract on January 9, 2023.

On March 10, 2023, Roberson was waived by the Los Angeles Rams.

=== Houston Roughnecks ===
Roberson signed with the Houston Roughnecks of the XFL on March 22, 2023. He was declared inactive in two games and did not play in one contest. He was released on April 12.

=== BC Lions ===
On May 8, 2023, he signed with the BC Lions of the Canadian Football League (CFL).

=== Calgary Stampeders ===
Roberson signed with the Calgary Stampeders of the CFL on January 31, 2024. He was released on May 15, 2024.
