= North Carolina–Wake Forest rivalry =

US university athletic rivalry

- North Carolina Wake Forest
- Sport: Football and Basketball
- First meeting: 1888 (football); 1910 (men's basketball)

Locations of North Carolina and Wake Forest.

The North Carolina–Wake Forest rivalry is a series of athletic contests between the University of North Carolina Tar Heels and the Wake Forest University Demon Deacons. The first football game between the two institutions was played in 1888. As a consequence of ACC expansion in the 21st century, the two schools do not play each other annually in football, as they were placed in separate divisions and assigned different opponents for their "protected" (i.e., annual) cross-division games. North Carolina got rival NC State as their cross-divisional opponent, while Wake Forest got Duke, which allowed the Duke-Wake Forest rivalry to continue. This rivalry is nonetheless part of the Tobacco Road rivalry between the four North Carolina schools in the ACC.

== Football ==
North Carolina–Wake Forest football rivalry
- North Carolina Wake Forest
- First meeting: October 10, 1888; Wake Forest 6, North Carolina 4
- Latest meeting: November 15, 2025; Wake Forest 28, North Carolina 12
- Next meeting: 2027

Statistics
- Total meetings: 112
- All-time series: North Carolina leads, 73–37–2
- Largest victory: North Carolina, 65–0 (1928)
- Longest win streak: North Carolina, 17 (1893–1923)
- Current win streak: Wake Forest, 1 (2025–present)

=== History ===
The University of North Carolina and Wake Forest University have a long shared athletic history, having formerly been located in close proximity to one another, as Wake Forest was originally located in Wake Forest, North Carolina. In 1956, the university moved its campus across the state of North Carolina to its current location in Winston-Salem, North Carolina.

The football rivalry, first meeting in 1888, is the oldest intercollegiate football rivalry in the American state of North Carolina As of 2025, there have been 112 games between the two teams. The 2019 and 2021 games were non-conference games and thus were not counted in the ACC standings. This unusual occurrence of a non-conference regular season game between teams in the same conference has only occurred once before in the recent history of the major FBS conferences.

=== Results ===
North Carolina victories	Wake Forest victories	Ties	Forfeits

No.	Date	Location	Winner	Score
1	October 18, 1888	Raleigh	Wake Forest	6–4
2	March 1, 1889	Raleigh	North Carolina	33–0
3	November 22, 1889	Chapel Hill	Wake Forest	18–8
4	November 10, 1891	Raleigh	Wake Forest	1†–0
5	November 18, 1893	Raleigh	North Carolina	40–0
6	September 17, 1908	Chapel Hill	North Carolina	17–0
7	October 2, 1909	Chapel Hill	North Carolina	18–0
8	October 22, 1910	Chapel Hill	North Carolina	37–0
9	October 7, 1911	Chapel Hill	North Carolina	12–3
10	October 12, 1912	Chapel Hill	North Carolina	9–2
11	September 27, 1913	Chapel Hill	North Carolina	7–0
12	November 15, 1913	Durham	North Carolina	29–0
13	October 8, 1914	Durham	North Carolina	53–0
14	November 14, 1914	Raleigh	North Carolina	12–7
15	October 9, 1915	Chapel Hill	North Carolina	35–0
16	September 30, 1916	Chapel Hill	North Carolina	20–0
17	October 18, 1919	Chapel Hill	North Carolina	6–0
18	October 2, 1920	Chapel Hill	North Carolina	6–0
19	October 1, 1921	Chapel Hill	North Carolina	21–0
20	September 30, 1922	Goldsboro	North Carolina	62–0
21	September 29, 1923	Chapel Hill	North Carolina	22–0
22	September 27, 1924	Wake Forest	Wake Forest	7–6
23	September 26, 1925	Chapel Hill	Wake Forest	6–0
24	September 25, 1926	Wake Forest	Wake Forest	13–0
25	September 24, 1927	Chapel Hill	Wake Forest	9–8
26	September 29, 1928	Chapel Hill	North Carolina	65–0
27	September 28, 1929	Chapel Hill	North Carolina	48–0
28	September 27, 1930	Chapel Hill	North Carolina	13–7
29	September 26, 1931	Chapel Hill	North Carolina	37–0
30	September 24, 1932	Chapel Hill	Tie	0–0
31	November 11, 1933	Chapel Hill	North Carolina	26–0
32	September 29, 1934	Chapel Hill	North Carolina	21–0
33	September 28, 1935	Chapel Hill	North Carolina	14–0
34	September 26, 1936	Charlotte	North Carolina	14–7
35	October 16, 1937	Wake Forest	North Carolina	28–0
36	September 24, 1938	Chapel Hill	North Carolina	14–6
37	September 30, 1939	Chapel Hill	North Carolina	36–6
38	September 28, 1940	Chapel Hill	Wake Forest	12–0
39	October 25, 1941	Wake Forest	Wake Forest	13–0
40	September 26, 1942	Chapel Hill	North Carolina	6–0
41	September 23, 1944	Chapel Hill	Wake Forest	7–0
42	November 17, 1945	Chapel Hill	Wake Forest	14–13
43	November 16, 1946	Chapel Hill	North Carolina	26–14
44	October 11, 1947	Chapel Hill	Wake Forest	19–7
45	October 9, 1948	Wake Forest	North Carolina	28–6
46	October 15, 1949	Chapel Hill	North Carolina	28–14
47	October 14, 1950	Chapel Hill	Wake Forest	13–7
48	October 27, 1951	Wake Forest	Wake Forest	39–7
49	October 18, 1952	Chapel Hill	Wake Forest	9–7
50	October 10, 1953	Wake Forest	North Carolina	18–13
51	October 23, 1954	Chapel Hill	North Carolina	14–7
52	October 22, 1955	Wake Forest	Wake Forest	25–0
53	October 27, 1956	Chapel Hill	Tie	6–6
54	October 26, 1957	Winston-Salem	North Carolina	14–7
55	October 25, 1958	Chapel Hill	North Carolina	26–7
56	October 24, 1959	Winston-Salem	North Carolina	21–19
57	October 15, 1960	Chapel Hill	Wake Forest	13–12

No.	Date	Location	Winner	Score
58	November 25, 1961	Winston-Salem	Wake Forest	17–14
59	October 27, 1962	Chapel Hill	North Carolina	23–14
60	October 5, 1963	Winston-Salem	North Carolina	21–0
61	October 3, 1964	Chapel Hill	North Carolina	23–0
62	October 23, 1965	Winston-Salem	Wake Forest	12–10
63	October 22, 1966	Chapel Hill	Wake Forest	3–0
64	October 28, 1967	Chapel Hill	Wake Forest	20–10
65	October 26, 1968	Winston-Salem	Wake Forest	48–31
66	October 25, 1969	Chapel Hill	North Carolina	23–3
67	October 24, 1970	Winston-Salem	Wake Forest	14–13
68	October 23, 1971	Chapel Hill	North Carolina	7–3
69	October 21, 1972	Winston-Salem	North Carolina	21–0
70	November 17, 1973	Chapel Hill	North Carolina	42–0
71	September 21, 1974	Winston-Salem	North Carolina	31–0
72	November 1, 1975	Chapel Hill	Wake Forest	21–9
73	October 30, 1976	Winston-Salem	North Carolina	34–14
74	October 8, 1977	Chapel Hill	North Carolina	24–3
75	October 14, 1978	Winston-Salem	North Carolina	34–29
76	October 13, 1979	Chapel Hill	Wake Forest	24–19
77	October 11, 1980	Winston-Salem	North Carolina	27–9
78	October 10, 1981	Chapel Hill	North Carolina	48–10
79	October 9, 1982	Winston-Salem	North Carolina	24–7
80	October 8, 1983	Chapel Hill	North Carolina	30–10
81	October 13, 1984	Winston-Salem	Wake Forest	14–3
82	October 12, 1985	Chapel Hill	North Carolina	34–14
83	October 11, 1986	Winston-Salem	North Carolina	40–30
84	October 10, 1987	Chapel Hill	Wake Forest	22–14
85	October 8, 1988	Winston-Salem	Wake Forest	42–24
86	October 7, 1989	Chapel Hill	Wake Forest	17–16
87	October 6, 1990	Winston-Salem	North Carolina	31–24
88	October 12, 1991	Chapel Hill	North Carolina	24–10
89	September 5, 1992	Winston-Salem	North Carolina	35–17
90	October 9, 1993	Chapel Hill	North Carolina	45–35
91	November 12, 1994	Winston-Salem	North Carolina	50–0
92	October 21, 1995	Chapel Hill	North Carolina	31–7
93	October 5, 1996	Winston-Salem	North Carolina	45–6
94	October 11, 1997	Chapel Hill	North Carolina	30–12
95	October 24, 1998	Winston-Salem	North Carolina	38–31
96	November 6, 1999	Chapel Hill	Wake Forest	19–3
97	September 9, 2000	Winston-Salem	North Carolina	35–14
98	November 10, 2001	Chapel Hill	Wake Forest	32–31
99	October 26, 2002	Winston-Salem	Wake Forest	31–0
100	November 8, 2003	Chapel Hill	North Carolina	42–34
101	November 13, 2004	Winston-Salem	North Carolina	31–24
102	October 28, 2006	Chapel Hill	Wake Forest	24–17
103	October 27, 2007	Winston-Salem	Wake Forest	37–10
104	October 29, 2011	Chapel Hill	North Carolina	49–24
105	September 8, 2012	Winston-Salem	Wake Forest	28–27
106	October 17, 2015	Chapel Hill	North Carolina	50–14
107	September 13, 2019	Winston-Salem	Wake Forest	24–18
108	November 14, 2020	Chapel Hill	North Carolina	59–53
109	November 6, 2021	Chapel Hill	North Carolina	58–55
110	November 12, 2022	Winston-Salem	#15 North Carolina	36–34
111	November 16, 2024	Chapel Hill	North Carolina	31–24
112	November 15, 2025	Winston-Salem	Wake Forest	28–12
Series: North Carolina leads 73–37–2
† North Carolina had to forfeit.

=== Notable games ===
==== 2001 ====
The Tar Heels built a 24–0 first-half lead behind a phenomenal performance by freshman quarterback Darian Durant, who threw for a freshman school record 361 yards. Carolina looked in control taking a 31–14 lead into the fourth quarter after Durant threw his fourth touchdown pass of the game. Then things began to unravel for the Tar Heels. After the Deacons cut the lead to 7, the Tar Heels snapped the ball out of the back of the end zone for a safety, cutting the lead to 31–26 with 4:49 left in the game. Wake Forest put together a 59-yard drive, capped by a 1-yard touchdown run by quarterback James MacPherson with just over a minute remaining. The Tar Heels’ final chance fell short as Wake safety Quinton Williams forced a Darian Durant fumble with 45 seconds remaining, and the Deacons won 32–31. The 24-point comeback was one of the largest in ACC history.

==== 2021 ====
Wake Forest entered the game 8–0 for the first time in program history and ranked #9 in the College Football Playoff rankings and #10 in the AP Poll, both rankings being the highest in program history. The game featured an explosion of offense as the teams combined for 1,161 total yards. With 7:38 remaining in the third quarter, Wake Forest quarterback Sam Hartman connected with receiver A.T. Perry on a 66 yard touchdown pass, which gave the Demon Deacons a 45–27 lead. Over the next 21 minutes of the game, North Carolina went on a 31–3 run which included three rushing touchdowns by running back Ty Chandler, who finished the game with career highs of 213 yards and four touchdowns. After Carolina cut the lead to seven with 10:40 left in the game, Tar Heel safety Cam'Ron Kelly intercepted Hartman for the second time of the game. The Tar Heels quickly scored, tying the game at 48–48. The Tar Heel defense forced two consecutive turnovers on downs as Carolina erased a 14-point fourth quarter deficit, ultimately winning the game 58–55. With the win, the Tar Heels notched their first home win against a top-ten opponent since defeating #3 Miami in 2004.

== Men's basketball ==
North Carolina–Wake Forest men's basketball rivalry
- North Carolina Wake Forest
- First meeting: 1910–11; North Carolina 31, Wake Forest 28
- Latest meeting: 2025–26; North Carolina 87, Wake Forest 84

Statistics
- Total meetings: 237
- All-time series: North Carolina leads, 167–70
- Largest victory: North Carolina, 95–57 (2018–19)
- Longest win streak: North Carolina, 19 (1926–1936)
- Current win streak: North Carolina, 2 (2025–present)

North Carolina currently leads the series 167–70.

The rivalry dates back to when Wake Forest was in Wake Forest, NC, and was only a short distance from UNC's campus. The rivalry that grew between the two schools became very intense, with fights breaking out on the court in certain match ups. Their rivalry eventually expanded into the Big Four with NC State and Duke, which are recognized as being some of the fiercest rivalries in NCAA men's basketball.

Over the years there have been many classic and exciting games in this series. In 1983, UNC came back from behind to win 80–78 at the Greensboro Coliseum. In 1995, the two teams faced each other in the ACC Tournament Championship game. Wake won behind center Tim Duncan and shooting guard Randolph Childress who made the go-ahead basket in an 82–80 overtime win.

North Carolina victories	Wake Forest victories

No.	Date	Winner	Score
1	1910–11	North Carolina	31–28
2	1910–11	Wake Forest	38–16
3	1911–12	North Carolina	18–15
4	1912–13	Wake Forest	22–21
5	1912–13	North Carolina	19–15
6	1913–14	North Carolina	28–24
7	1913–14	Wake Forest	39–30
8	1913–14	Wake Forest	32–29
9	1914–15	Wake Forest	26–23
10	1914–15	North Carolina	32–20
11	1914–15	Wake Forest	30–25
12	1915–16	Wake Forest	27–22
13	1918–19	North Carolina	30–17
14	1921–22	North Carolina	41–27
15	1921–22	North Carolina	32–28
16	1922–23	North Carolina	38–26
17	1922–23	North Carolina	25–23
18	1923–24	North Carolina	32–16
19	1923–24	North Carolina	33–12
20	1924–25	North Carolina	22–18
21	1924–25	North Carolina	44–24
22	1925–26	Wake Forest	29–28
23	1925–26	North Carolina	32–22
24	1926–27	Wake Forest	30–23
25	1926–27	North Carolina	32–26
26	1927–28	North Carolina	38–22
27	1927–28	North Carolina	29–17
28	1928–29	North Carolina	42–19
29	1928–29	North Carolina	34–10
30	1929–30	North Carolina	49–18
31	1929–30	North Carolina	37–15
32	1930–31	North Carolina	30–13
33	1930–31	North Carolina	45–25
34	1931–32	North Carolina	32–17
35	1931–32	North Carolina	34–24
36	1932–33	North Carolina	36–33
37	1932–33	North Carolina	38–26
38	1933–34	North Carolina	41–21
39	1933–34	North Carolina	41–21
40	1934–35	North Carolina	31–11
41	1934–35	North Carolina	32–21
42	1935–36	North Carolina	26–19
43	1935–36	North Carolina	32–23
44	1936–37	Wake Forest	24–23
45	1936–37	North Carolina	31–30
46	1936–37	North Carolina	37–35
47	1937–38	North Carolina	31–26
48	1937–38	Wake Forest	44–34
49	1938–39	Wake Forest	57–37
50	1938–39	North Carolina	56–54
51	1939–40	North Carolina	54–51
52	1939–40	Wake Forest	42–36
53	1939–40	North Carolina	43–35
54	1940–41	North Carolina	61–45
55	1940–41	North Carolina	43–40
56	1941–42	Wake Forest	36–20
57	1941–42	North Carolina	51–30
58	1941–42	Wake Forest	32–26
59	1942–43	North Carolina	49–37
60	1942–43	North Carolina	32–31
61	1944–45	North Carolina	65–29
62	1944–45	North Carolina	65–40
63	1945–46	North Carolina	70–47
64	1945–46	North Carolina	61–32
65	1945–46	Wake Forest	31–29
66	1946–47	North Carolina	70–49
67	1946–47	North Carolina	54–46
68	1947–48	North Carolina	56–35
69	1947–48	Wake Forest	53–37
70	1948–49	North Carolina	55–50
71	1948–49	North Carolina	69–54
72	1949–50	North Carolina	54–50
73	1949–50	Wake Forest	57–54
74	1950–51	North Carolina	65–56
75	1950–51	North Carolina	82–70
76	1951–52	Wake Forest	55–53
77	1951–52	Wake Forest	55–46
78	1952–53	North Carolina	72–68
79	1952–53	Wake Forest	89–63
80	1953–54	North Carolina	66–65

No.	Date	Winner	Score
81	1953–54	Wake Forest	76–62
82	1954–55	North Carolina	95–79
83	1954–55	North Carolina	83–79
84	1954–55	Wake Forest	95–82
85	1955–56	Wake Forest	76–71
86	1955–56	North Carolina	77–73
87	1955–56	Wake Forest	77–56
88	1956–57	North Carolina	63–55
89	1956–57	North Carolina	72–69
90	1956–57	North Carolina	69–64
91	1956–57	North Carolina	61–59
92	1957–58	North Carolina	71–45
93	1957–58	North Carolina	60–57
94	1958–59	North Carolina	44–34
95	1958–59	North Carolina	75–66
96	1959–60	Wake Forest	53–50
97	1959–60	North Carolina	62–59
98	1959–60	Wake Forest	80–69
99	1960–61	North Carolina	83–74
100	1960–61	North Carolina	93–78
101	1961–62	Wake Forest	91–72
102	1961–62	Wake Forest	87–80
103	1962–63	Wake Forest	78–70
104	1962–63	Wake Forest	72–71
105	1962–63	Wake Forest	56–55
106	1963–64	Wake Forest	80–71
107	1963–64	North Carolina	81–73
108	1964–65	Wake Forest	107–85
109	1964–65	North Carolina	107–91
110	1964–65	Wake Forest	92–76
111	1965–66	North Carolina	99–83
112	1965–66	North Carolina	115–87
113	1966–67	North Carolina	76–74
114	1966–67	North Carolina	75–73
115	1966–67	North Carolina	89–79
116	1967–68	North Carolina	74–62
117	1967–68	North Carolina	80–60
118	1967–68	North Carolina	83–70
119	1968–69	North Carolina	94–89
120	1968–69	North Carolina	84–76
121	1968–69	North Carolina	80–72
122	1969–70	Wake Forest	91–90
123	1969–70	Wake Forest	88–85
124	1970–71	Wake Forest	96–84
125	1970–71	North Carolina	93–75
126	1971–72	North Carolina	99–76
127	1971–72	North Carolina	92–72
128	1971–72	North Carolina	71–59
129	1972–73	North Carolina	99–80
130	1972–73	North Carolina	69–51
131	1972–73	Wake Forest	54–52
132	1973–74	North Carolina	95–78
133	1973–74	North Carolina	77–67
134	1973–74	North Carolina	76–62
135	1974–75	North Carolina	80–78
136	1974–75	North Carolina	101–91
137	1974–75	North Carolina	101–100
138	1975–76	Wake Forest	95–83
139	1975–76	North Carolina	99–74
140	1975–76	North Carolina	88–85
141	1976–77	Wake Forest	97–96
142	1976–77	North Carolina	77–75
143	1976–77	Wake Forest	67–66
144	1977–78	North Carolina	71–69
145	1977–78	Wake Forest	71–62
146	1977–78	Wake Forest	82–77
147	1978–79	North Carolina	73–55
148	1978–79	Wake Forest	59–56
149	1978–79	North Carolina	76–69
150	1979–80	North Carolina	72–68
151	1979–80	North Carolina	73–61
152	1979–80	North Carolina	75–62
153	1980–81	Wake Forest	82–71
154	1980–81	North Carolina	74–60
155	1980–81	Wake Forest	84–68
156	1980–81	North Carolina	58–57
157	1981–82	Wake Forest	55–48
158	1981–82	North Carolina	69–51
159	1982–83	North Carolina	58–57
160	1982–83	North Carolina	58–57

No.	Date	Winner	Score
161	1983–84	North Carolina	70–62
162	1983–84	North Carolina	100–63
163	1984–85	North Carolina	79–73
164	1984–85	North Carolina	69–59
165	1984–85	North Carolina	72–61
166	1985–86	North Carolina	89–65
167	1985–86	North Carolina	91–62
168	1986–87	North Carolina	79–53
169	1986–87	North Carolina	94–85
170	1987–88	Wake Forest	83–80
171	1987–88	North Carolina	80–62
172	1987–88	North Carolina	83–62
173	1988–89	North Carolina	88–74
174	1988–89	North Carolina	99–76
175	1989–90	North Carolina	73–61
176	1989–90	North Carolina	72–67
177	1990–91	North Carolina	91–81
178	1990–91	North Carolina	85–70
179	1991–92	North Carolina	90–79
180	1991–92	North Carolina	80–78
181	1991–92	North Carolina	80–65
182	1992–93	Wake Forest	88–62
183	1992–93	North Carolina	83–65
184	1993–94	North Carolina	85–61
185	1993–94	Wake Forest	68–61
186	1993–94	North Carolina	86–84
187	1994–95	North Carolina	62–61
188	1994–95	Wake Forest	79–70
189	1994–95	Wake Forest	82–80
190	1995–96	North Carolina	65–59
191	1995–96	Wake Forest	84–60
192	1996–97	Wake Forest	81–57
193	1996–97	North Carolina	74–60
194	1996–97	North Carolina	86–73
195	1997–98	North Carolina	79–73
196	1997–98	North Carolina	72–53
197	1998–99	North Carolina	52–40
198	1998–99	North Carolina	68–65
199	1999–2000	Wake Forest	66–57
200	1999–2000	North Carolina	87–64
201	1999–2000	Wake Forest	58–52
202	2000–01	North Carolina	70–69
203	2000–01	North Carolina	80–74
204	2001–02	Wake Forest	84–62
205	2001–02	Wake Forest	90–66
206	2002–03	Wake Forest	79–75
207	2002–03	Wake Forest	75–60
208	2003–04	Wake Forest	119–114
209	2003–04	North Carolina	79–73
210	2004–05	Wake Forest	95–82
211	2005–06	North Carolina	83–72
212	2006–07	North Carolina	88–60
213	2006–07	North Carolina	104–67
214	2007–08	North Carolina	89–73
215	2008–09	Wake Forest	92–89
216	2009–10	Wake Forest	82–69
217	2009–10	North Carolina	77–68
218	2010–11	North Carolina	78–64
219	2011–12	North Carolina	68–53
220	2012–13	North Carolina	87–62
221	2013–14	Wake Forest	73–67
222	2013–14	North Carolina	105–72
223	2014–15	North Carolina	87–71
224	2015–16	North Carolina	83–68
225	2016–17	North Carolina	93–87
226	2017–18	North Carolina	73–69
227	2018–19	North Carolina	95–57
228	2019–20	Wake Forest	74–57
229	2019–20	North Carolina	93–83
230	2020–21	North Carolina	80–73
231	2021–22	Wake Forest	98–76
232	2022–23	North Carolina	88–79
233	2022–23	Wake Forest	92–85
234	2023–24	North Carolina	85–64
235	2024–25	Wake Forest	67–66
236	2024–25	North Carolina	68–59
237	2025–26	North Carolina	87–84
Series: North Carolina leads 167–70

== See also ==
- List of NCAA college football rivalry games
- List of most-played college football series in NCAA Division I
