= Warren Ruggiero =

American football player and coach (born 1966)

Current position
- Title: Senior offensive analyst
- Team: Virginia Tech Hokies
- Conference: ACC

Biographical details
- Born: April 2, 1966 (age 60); Glen Rock, New Jersey, U.S.

Playing career
- 1985–1988: Delaware
- Position: Quarterback

Coaching career (HC unless noted)
- 1989–1993: Defiance (OC)
- 1994–1996: Clarion (OC)
- 1997–1998: Glenville State
- 1999: William & Mary (TE)
- 2000–2001: Hofstra (QB/RC)
- 2002–2005: Hofstra (OC/QB)
- 2006–2007: Elon (OC/QB)
- 2008: Kansas State (QB)
- 2009–2013: Bowling Green (OC/QB)
- 2014–2024: Wake Forest (OC/QB)
- 2025: Iowa (OA)
- 2026–present: Virginia Tech (OA)

Head coaching record
- Overall: 15–8
- Tournaments: 0–1 (Division II)

Accomplishments and honors

Championships
- 1 WVIAC (1997)

Warren Ruggiero (born April 2, 1966) is an American football coach. Raised in Glen Rock, New Jersey, Ruggiero played prep football at Glen Rock High School.

== Coaching career ==
=== Early coaching career ===
Ruggiero spent five seasons as the offensive coordinator at Defiance College and three in the same role at Clarion. During his time at Clarion, the team made a national semi-final appearance in 1996.

=== Glenville State ===
Ruggiero spent two seasons as the head coach at Glenville State. He led the Pioneers to the Division two playoffs and finished with a 15–8 record.

=== William & Mary ===
Ruggiero coached tight ends during his time at W&M.

=== Hofstra ===
Ruggiero started as the quarterbacks coach and was promoted to offensive coordinator. The Pride led the Atlantic 10 conference in passing during the 2004 and 2005 seasons under Ruggiero. He also recruited and coached Marques Colston. Ruggiero also helped coach quarterback Rocky Butler to the fourth-most passing yards in I-AA.

=== Elon ===
Ruggiero spent two seasons at Elon where he coached quarterback Scott Riddle to first-team All-American honors and Southern Conference freshman of the year, while setting many school records.

=== Kansas State ===
In his only season at Kansas State, Ruggiero coached future first-round pick Josh Freeman and mentored Collin Klein.

=== Bowling Green ===
Ruggiero helped Bowling Green to 31st in total offense in 2013. Also during the 2013 season Bowling Green went 10-3 and averaged 35.4 points per game.

=== Wake Forest ===
Ruggiero's offense set records for points scored and total yards in 2017. Under Ruggiero, the offense broke over 100 individual and team records. He also coached three successful quarterbacks in John Wolford, Jamie Newman, and Sam Hartman. Following the 2024 season, Ruggiero was not retained by new head coach Jake Dickert.

== Head coaching record ==
Year	Team	Overall	Conference	Standing	Bowl/playoffs
Glenville State Pioneers (West Virginia Intercollegiate Athletic Conference) (1997–1998)
1997	Glenville State	9–3	6–1	1st	L NCAA Division II First Round
1998	Glenville State	6–5	4–3	T–3rd	
Glenville State:		15–8	10–4		
Total:		15–8			
National championship Conference title Conference division title or championship game berth
