= Dylan Hazen =

American gridiron football player (born 2002)

No. 30 – Winnipeg Blue Bombers
- Position: Linebacker
- Roster status: 6-game injured list
- CFL status: American

Personal information
- Born: August 7, 2002 (age 24)
- Listed height: 6 ft 0 in (1.83 m)
- Listed weight: 229 lb (104 kg)

Career information
- High school: The Woodlands College Park (The Woodlands, Texas)
- College: Wake Forest (2021–2025)
- NFL draft: 2026: undrafted

Career history
- Winnipeg Blue Bombers (2026–present)
- Stats at CFL.ca

Dylan Hazen (born August 7, 2002) is an American professional football linebacker for the Winnipeg Blue Bombers of the Canadian Football League (CFL). He played college football for the Wake Forest Demon Deacons.

== Early life ==
Hazen was born on August 7, 2002. He attended The Woodlands College Park High School in The Woodlands, Texas. Rated as a three-star recruit, Hazen committed to play college football at Wake Forest University.

== College career ==
Hazen played college football for the Wake Forest Demon Deacons from 2021 to 2025. In 53 games, he had 284 tackles, including 27.5 for loss, 2.5 sacks, two interceptions, three pass deflections, three forced fumbles and three fumble recoveries. As a senior, he earned All-ACC honorable mention.

== Professional career ==
Pre-draft measurables
Height	Weight	Arm length	Hand span	Wingspan	40-yard dash	10-yard split	20-yard split	20-yard shuttle	Three-cone drill	Vertical jump	Broad jump	Bench press
6 ft 0 in (1.83 m)	224 lb (102 kg)	30 3/8 in (0.77 m)	9 3/8 in (0.24 m)	6 ft 3 3/8 in (1.91 m)	4.63 s	1.57 s	2.68 s	4.14 s	6.77 s	39 in (0.99 m)	10 ft 4 in (3.15 m)	26 reps
All values from Pro day

On June 8, 2026, Hazen signed with the Winnipeg Blue Bombers of the Canadian Football League (CFL). On July 8, he was elevated to the active roster and made his CFL debut on July 10, against the Toronto Argonauts. On July 17, Hazen reverted to the practice roster. On August 12, he was again promoted to the active roster. Hazen made one special teams tackle on three games before he was place on the 6-game injured list with a head injury.
