= Jamie Newman =

American gridiron football player (born 1997)

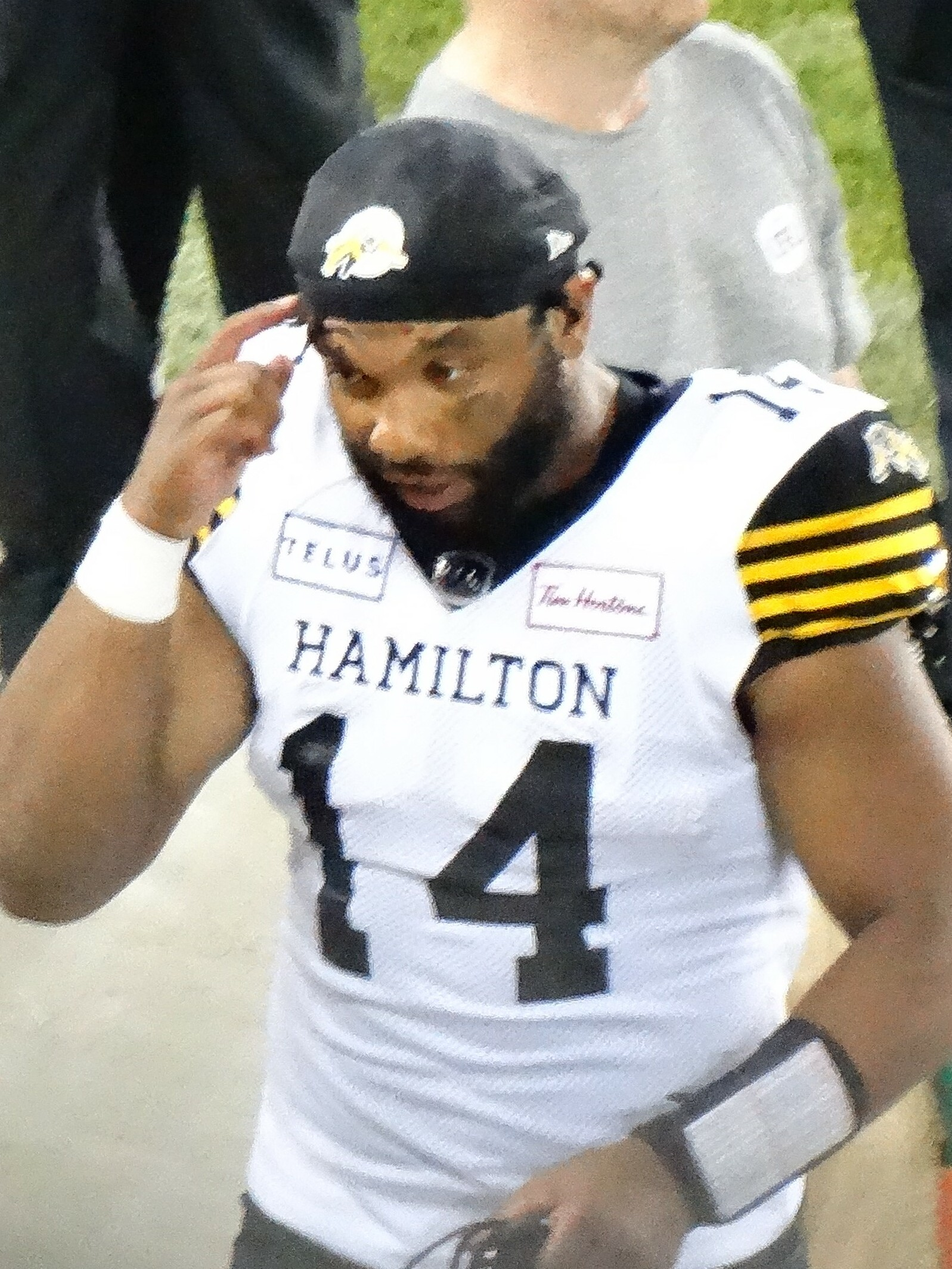
- Newman with the Hamilton Tiger-Cats in 2022

No. 14
- Position: Quarterback

Personal information
- Born: December 1, 1997 (age 28); Graham, North Carolina, U.S.
- Listed height: 6 ft 4 in (1.93 m)
- Listed weight: 230 lb (104 kg)

Career information
- High school: Graham
- College: Wake Forest (2016–2019); Georgia (2020)
- NFL draft: 2021: undrafted

Career history
- Philadelphia Eagles (2021)*; Hamilton Tiger-Cats (2022)
- * Offseason or practice squad member only

Career CFL statistics
- Passing completions: 16
- Passing attempts: 27
- Completion percentage: 60.0
- TD–INT: 0–1
- Passing yards: 175
- Stats at CFL.ca
- Stats at Pro Football Reference

Jamie Newman (born December 1, 1997) is an American former professional football quarterback. He played college football at Wake Forest before transferring to Georgia in 2020, although he opted out of playing that season due to the COVID-19 pandemic. Newman signed with the Philadelphia Eagles as an undrafted free agent in 2021 but was released prior to the season. He played for the Hamilton Tiger-Cats of the Canadian Football League (CFL) in 2022.

== Early life ==
Newman attended Graham High School in Graham, North Carolina. He was a four-year starter at quarterback in high school. He committed to Wake Forest University to play college football.

== College career ==
=== Wake Forest ===
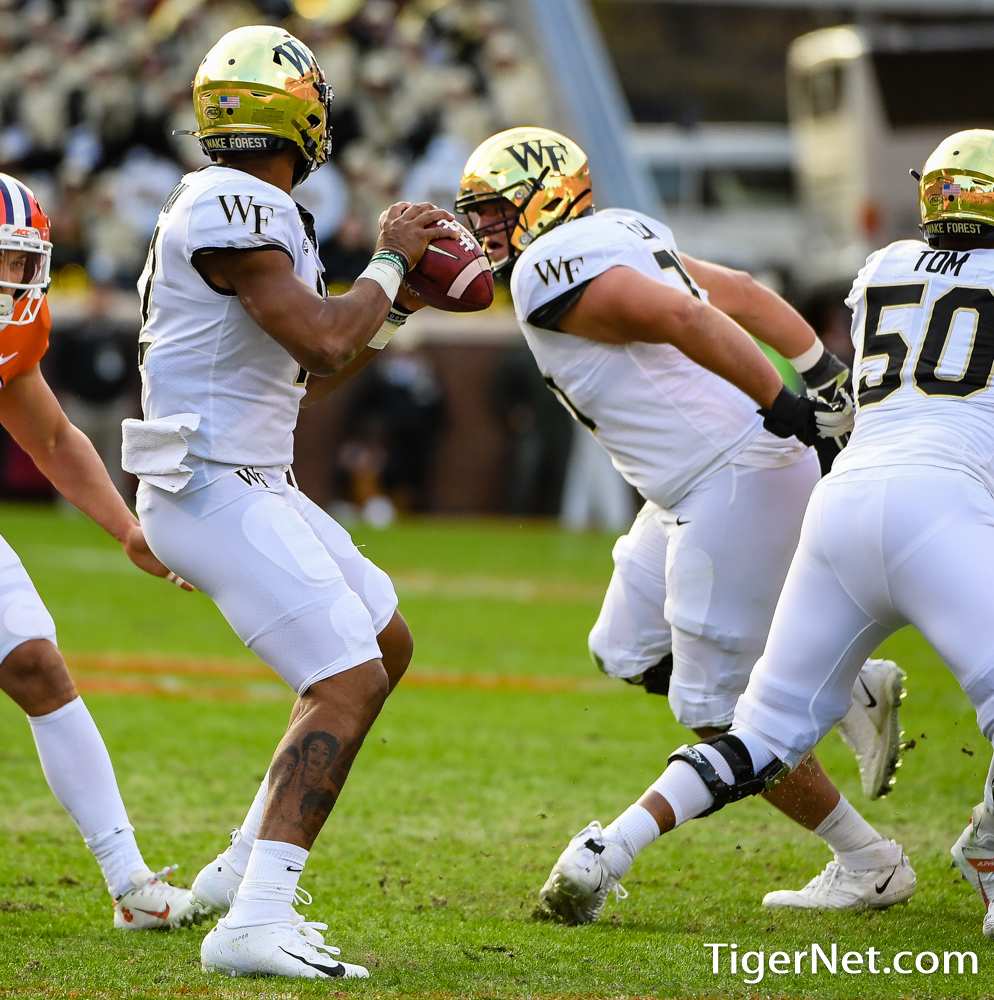
Newman during his time at Wake Forest, 2019

Newman redshirted his first year at Wake Forest in 2016. As a backup to John Wolford in 2017, he completed two of four passes for eight yards and an interception. Newman entered 2018 as backup to Sam Hartman, but started the final four games after Hartman was hurt. He was named the 2018 Birmingham Bowl MVP after throwing for 328 yards and a touchdown. For the season, he completed 84 of 141 passes for 1,083 yards, nine touchdowns and four interceptions. Newman beat out Hartman for the starting job entering 2019.

=== Georgia ===
In January 2020 Newman announced that he would transfer to Georgia for his final year of eligibility. That September, Newman announced that he would be opting out of the 2020 season due to concerns regarding the COVID-19 pandemic. As a result, Newman did not take a single snap with the Bulldogs.

=== Statistics ===
Season	Team	GP	Passing						Rushing			
Season	Team	GP	Cmp	Att	Pct	Yds	TD	Int	Att	Yds	Avg	TD
2017	Wake Forest	1	2	4	50.0	8	0	1	1	5	5.0	0
2018	Wake Forest	6	84	141	59.6	1,083	9	4	64	247	3.9	4
2019	Wake Forest	12	220	361	60.9	2,868	26	11	180	574	3.2	6
2020	Georgia	0	Opted out due to COVID-19 pandemic									
Career		19	306	506	60.5	3,959	35	16	245	826	3.4	10

== Professional career ==
Pre-draft measurables
Height	Weight	Arm length	Hand span
6 ft 2 7/8 in (1.90 m)	234 lb (106 kg)	30 1/4 in (0.77 m)	9 3/4 in (0.25 m)
All values from Pro Day

=== Philadelphia Eagles ===
Newman signed with the Philadelphia Eagles as an undrafted free agent on May 14, 2021, but was waived on June 9.

=== Hamilton Tiger-Cats ===
Newman was signed by the Hamilton Tiger-Cats of the Canadian Football League on February 6, 2022. He scored his first touchdown on July 28, versus the Montreal Alouettes. Newman made his first CFL start on September 5, with starting quarterback Dane Evans nursing an injured shoulder. Newman was ineffective in his debut, completing 14 of 25 pass attempts for 171 yards and an interception, and the Tiger-Cats were defeated 28–8 by their rivals the Toronto Argonauts, falling to last place in the East division.
