= Sam Hartman =

American football player (born 1999)

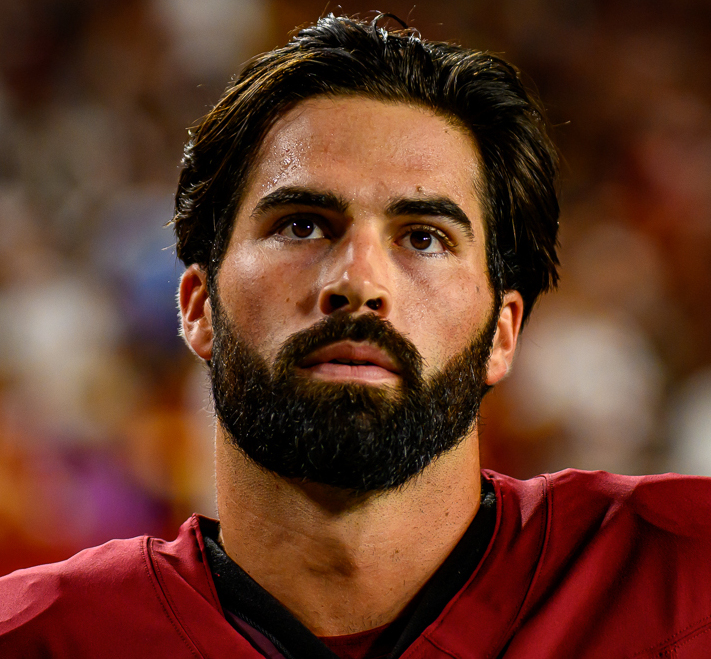
- Hartman with the Washington Commanders in 2025

No. 15 – Washington Commanders
- Position: Quarterback
- Roster status: Practice squad

Personal information
- Born: July 29, 1999 (age 27); Charlotte, North Carolina, U.S.
- Listed height: 6 ft 1 in (1.85 m)
- Listed weight: 209 lb (95 kg)

Career information
- High school: Oceanside Collegiate (Mount Pleasant, South Carolina)
- College: Wake Forest (2018–2022); Notre Dame (2023)
- NFL draft: 2024: undrafted

Career history
- Washington Commanders (2024–present)

Awards and highlights
- Brian Piccolo Award (2022); Second-team All-ACC (2021); Third-team All-ACC (2022)
- Stats at Pro Football Reference

Samuel Hartman (born July 29, 1999) is an American professional football quarterback for the Washington Commanders of the National Football League (NFL). Hartman played five seasons of college football for the Wake Forest Demon Deacons, setting several school records and finishing as the all-time passing touchdowns leader in Atlantic Coast Conference (ACC) history. He played with the Notre Dame Fighting Irish in 2023 before signing with the Commanders as an undrafted free agent in 2024.

== Early life ==
Hartman was born on July 29, 1999, in Charlotte, North Carolina. As a sophomore and junior at Davidson Day School in nearby Davidson, Hartman threw for 6,388 passing yards and 69 touchdowns as a team captain at quarterback, being named first-team all-state as a junior and was given the Charlotte Observer player of the week award four times.

He transferred to Oceanside Collegiate Academy in Mount Pleasant, South Carolina, for his senior season and led them to a 7–3 record while throwing for 3,093 yards passing and 29 touchdowns, in addition to nine rushing scores. Hartman was rated the No. 12 pro-style passer in the class of 2018 by 247Sports.com and was a three-star recruit. He was featured in the documentary series QB1: Beyond the Lights for his senior season.

== College career ==
=== Wake Forest (2018–2022) ===
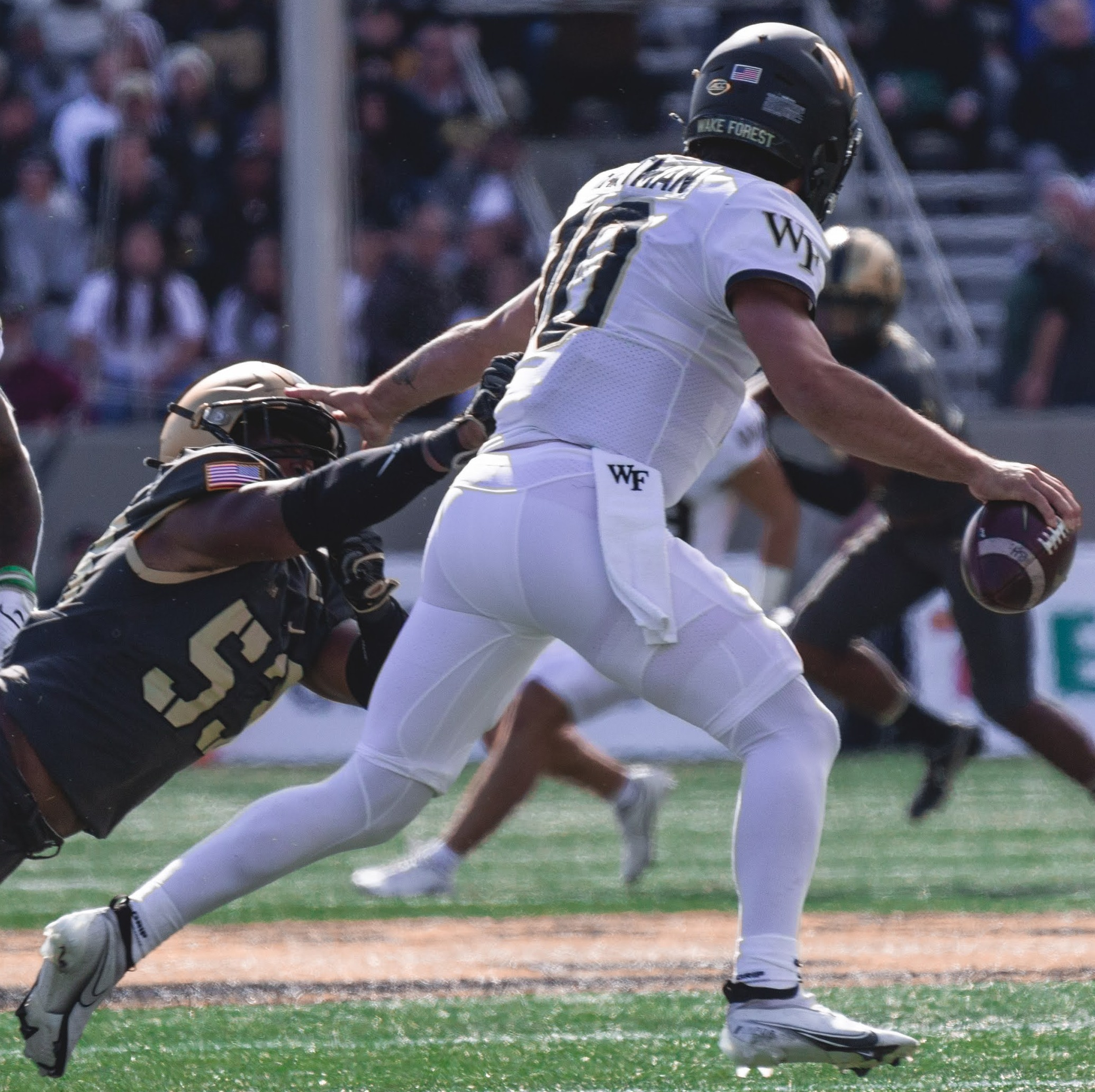
Hartman with the Wake Forest Demon Deacons in 2021

==== 2018 season ====
Hartman accepted a scholarship offer from Wake Forest University to play for the Demon Deacons. He started the season opener against Tulane and was one of five freshman quarterbacks to start the season in the NCAA Division I Football Bowl Subdivision. He was 31-for-51 passing against Tulane, throwing for 378 yards and leading them to a win in overtime. He was the first freshman to start the season-opener as a quarterback in school history. Through the first three games of the season, Hartman led all freshmen in the country for yards of offense and made two or more touchdown passes in each game. He was named ACC Conference rookie of the week following a win on September 29 versus Rice, in which he tied the school record for consecutive completions with 12. He led them to a 4–4 record before suffering an injury against Syracuse that kept him out for the rest of the season.

==== 2019 season ====
After extensive competition throughout the spring and fall camp, Hartman was the backup quarterback as a sophomore in 2019 behind Jamie Newman, only appearing in four games, thus preserving a redshirt for the season. He saw his first action of the season against Louisville on October 12, when he took over in the fourth quarter trailing 38–55. Hartman led them to three-straight scoring drives, as they lost 59–62. He was named starter prior to their next game versus Florida State, and led Wake Forest to a 22–20 victory. He next saw playing time late in the year versus Syracuse, playing from the second to fourth quarters. He threw two passes in the season finale, a loss to Michigan State in the 2019 Pinstripe Bowl.

==== 2020 season ====
He regained a starting position as a redshirt sophomore in 2020, being named team captain and playing in all nine games. Against North Carolina, Hartman compiled 429 passing yards and four touchdown passes in the 53–59 loss. He finished the season ranked 28th nationally with 2,224 passing yards. Due to extensive disruption to college football caused by the COVID-19 pandemic, the NCAA ruled that the 2020–21 school year would not be counted against the eligibility of any football player.

==== 2021 season ====
In 2021, Hartman led his team to an 8–0 start, the best in school history, and ultimately led Wake Forest to the ACC Championship game. However, Wake Forest fell 45–21 to 13th-ranked Pitt, with Hartman throwing 4 interceptions in the loss. He earned national honors following a game against Army, in which Hartman compiled a career-best 458 passing yards and five touchdowns. He was named the Davey O'Brien National Quarterback of the Week, PFN National Offensive Player of the Week, Maxwell Award Player of the Week, and CFPA national performer of the week. He set several Wake Forest single-season records, including 39 touchdown passes and 4,228 passing yards.

==== 2022 season ====
Hartman played 12 games in 2022 and threw for 3,701 yards and 38 touchdowns, earning second-team All-ACC honors. He led the Demon Deacons to an overall record of 8–5 and to a win in the Gasparilla Bowl, earning MVP honors in the game and being the first person in school history to win two bowl MVP honors. He was also named the winner of the Brian Piccolo Award for the "most courageous" player in the ACC, as Hartman had suffered from Paget–Schroetter disease and had to undergo surgery early in the season, but only missed one game despite the illness. He was a finalist for the Manning Award and Johnny Unitas Golden Arm Award, and a semifinalist for Davey O'Brien Award.

Hartman finished his time at Wake Forest as the record holder for career passing attempts, completions, yards, and touchdowns while also having the most touchdown passes (110) and second-most passing yards in conference history (12,967); his total passing yards also ranks top 20 in FBS history. He ranks top three in the ACC for touchdown passes, career completions, passing attempts, and passing yards and also is top-25 all-time in FBS history for touchdown passes and passing yards. Additionally, Hartman holds single-season Wake Forest records for passing touchdowns, yards per game, total yards, total touchdowns, and passing yards, and is the all-time ACC leader with 21 career 300-yard passing games.

=== Notre Dame (2023) ===
On January 5, 2023, Hartman announced his intent to transfer to Notre Dame for the sixth and final season of his college career. On August 26, 2023, Hartman started his first game for Notre Dame playing against Navy in Dublin, Ireland. He completed 19 of 23 pass attempts for 251 yards and four touchdowns, tying a program record for touchdown passes in a player's debut. Hartman started all 12 games of the regular season. Following the season, Hartman opted out of the Sun Bowl to prepare for the 2024 NFL draft.

=== Statistics ===
College statistics
Season	Team	Games			Passing								Rushing			
Season	Team	GP	GS	Record	Comp	Att	Pct	Yards	Avg	TD	Int	Rate	Att	Yards	Avg	TD
2018	Wake Forest	9	9	4–5	161	291	55.3	1,984	6.8	16	8	125.2	108	275	2.6	2
2019	Wake Forest	4	1	1–0	55	97	56.7	830	8.6	4	2	138.1	27	89	3.3	1
2020	Wake Forest	9	9	4–5	159	273	58.2	2,224	8.1	13	5	138.7	63	−1	0.0	2
2021	Wake Forest	14	14	11–3	299	508	58.9	4,228	8.3	39	14	148.6	117	364	3.1	11
2022	Wake Forest	12	12	7–5	270	428	63.1	3,701	8.6	38	12	159.4	102	129	1.3	1
2023	Notre Dame	12	12	9–3	191	301	63.5	2,689	8.9	24	8	159.5	45	123	2.7	3
Career		60	57	34–20	1,135	1,898	59.8	15,656	8.3	134	49	147.2	462	979	2.1	20

== Professional career ==
Pre-draft measurables
Height	Weight	Arm length	Hand span	Wingspan	40-yard dash	10-yard split	20-yard split	20-yard shuttle	Three-cone drill	Vertical jump	Broad jump
6 ft 1 1/8 in (1.86 m)	211 lb (96 kg)	31 3/8 in (0.80 m)	9 3/4 in (0.25 m)	6 ft 3 1/4 in (1.91 m)	4.80 s	1.63 s	2.81 s	4.34 s	7.19 s	28.5 in (0.72 m)	9 ft 1 in (2.77 m)
All values from NFL Combine

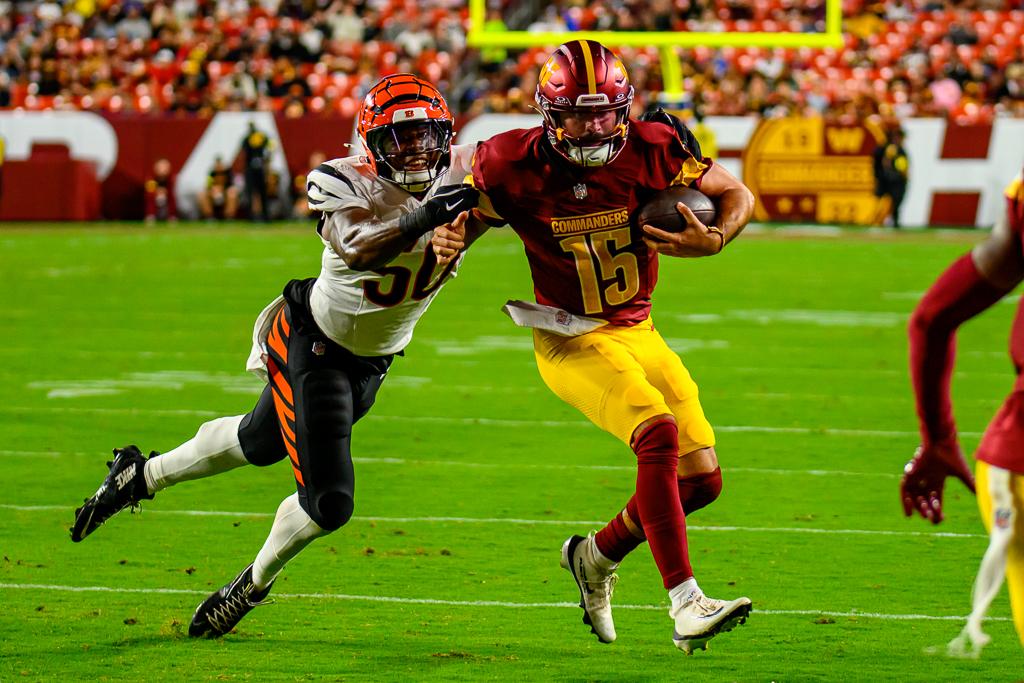
Hartman with the Washington Commanders in 2025

Hartman went undrafted in the 2024 NFL draft and then signed with the Washington Commanders as an undrafted free agent the day after the draft ended on April 28, 2024, with $245,000 guaranteed. Hartman was waived by the Commanders on August 27, and joined their practice squad the following day. Hartman was promoted to the active roster on September 7, following an injury to backup Marcus Mariota. He was released from the active roster on October 11, signing with the practice squad the following day.

On January 28, 2025, Hartman signed a reserve/future contract with the Commanders. He started the team's first preseason game against the New England Patriots on August 8. Hartman was waived on August 26, and re–signed with their practice squad the following day. Hartman was promoted to the active roster on December 24.

Hartman was released by the Commanders as a part of final roster cuts on August 30, 2026; he was re-signed to their practice squad the following day. The Ottawa Redblacks of the Canadian Football League added Hartman to their negotiation list on August 31.

== In the media ==
On November 13, 2026, ABC announced that Hartman would be the star of the 30th season of The Bachelor, which is scheduled to premiere on March 21, 2027.
