= 2023 Duke Blue Devils football team =

American college football season

2023 Duke Blue Devils football

Birmingham Bowl champion

Birmingham Bowl, W 17–10 vs. Troy
- Conference: Atlantic Coast Conference
- Record: 8–5 (4–4 ACC)
- Head coach: Mike Elko (2nd season; regular season); Trooper Taylor (interim, bowl game)
- Offensive coordinator: Kevin Johns (2nd season)
- Offensive scheme: Multiple
- Co-defensive coordinators: Tyler Santucci (1st season); Lyle Hemphill (1st season)
- Base defense: 4–2–5
- Home stadium: Wallace Wade Stadium

2023 Atlantic Coast Conference football standings
	Conf.			Overall
Team	W		L	W		L
No. 6 Florida State y$	8	–	0	13	–	1
No. 19 Louisville y	7	–	1	10	–	4
No. 21 NC State	6	–	2	9	–	4
Georgia Tech	5	–	3	7	–	6
Virginia Tech	5	–	3	7	–	6
No. 20 Clemson	4	–	4	9	–	4
Duke	4	–	4	8	–	5
North Carolina	4	–	4	8	–	5
Boston College	3	–	5	7	–	6
Miami (FL)	3	–	5	7	–	6
Syracuse	2	–	6	6	–	7
Pittsburgh	2	–	6	3	–	9
Virginia	2	–	6	3	–	9
Wake Forest	1	–	7	4	–	8
Championship: Florida State 16, Louisville 6
$ – Conference champion; y – Championship game participant; Rankings from AP Poll

The 2023 Duke Blue Devils football team represented Duke University in the 2023 NCAA Division I FBS football season as a member of the Atlantic Coast Conference (ACC). The Blue Devils were led by head coach Mike Elko, in his second year, and played their home games at Wallace Wade Stadium in Durham, North Carolina. The Duke Blue Devils football team drew an average home attendance of 25,111 in 2023.

== Schedule ==
Duke and the ACC announced the 2023 football schedule on January 30, 2023. The 2023 season will be the conference's first season since 2004, that its scheduling format just includes one division. The new format sets Duke with three set conference opponents, while playing the remaining ten teams twice (home and away) in a four–year cycle. The Blue Devils three set conference opponents for the next four years are: NC State, North Carolina, and Wake Forest. As such, this is the first season since 1932 that the Blue Devils didn't play rival Georgia Tech.

Date	Time	Opponent	Rank	Site	TV	Result	Attendance
September 4	8:00 p.m.	No. 9 Clemson		Wallace Wade Stadium; Durham, NC	ESPN	W 28–7	31,638
September 9	6:00 p.m.	Lafayette*	No. 21	Wallace Wade Stadium; Durham, NC	ACCNX/ESPN+	W 42–7	17,481
September 16	3:30 p.m.	Northwestern*	No. 21	Wallace Wade Stadium; Durham, NC	ACCN	W 38–14	18,141
September 23	3:30 p.m.	at UConn*	No. 18	Rentschler Field; East Hartford, CT	CBSSN	W 41–7	29,033
September 30	7:30 p.m.	No. 11 Notre Dame*^{†}	No. 17	Wallace Wade Stadium; Durham, NC (College GameDay)	ABC	L 14–21	40,768
October 14	8:00 p.m.	NC State	No. 17	Wallace Wade Stadium; Durham, NC (rivalry)	ACCN	W 24–3	31,833
October 21	7:30 p.m.	at No. 4 Florida State	No. 16	Doak Campbell Stadium; Tallahassee, FL	ABC	L 20–38	79,560
October 28	3:30 p.m.	at No. 18 Louisville	No. 20	L&N Stadium; Louisville, KY	ESPN	L 0–23	52,319
November 2	7:30 p.m.	Wake Forest		Wallace Wade Stadium; Durham, NC (rivalry)	ESPN	W 24–21	18,277
November 11	8:00 pm	at No. 24 North Carolina		Kenan Stadium; Chapel Hill, NC (Victory Bell)	ACCN	L 45–47 ^{2OT}	50,500
November 18	3:00 p.m.	at Virginia		Scott Stadium; Charlottesville, VA	The CW	L 27–30	36,400
November 25	12:00 p.m.	Pittsburgh		Wallace Wade Stadium; Durham, NC	ACCN	W 30–19	17,639
December 23	12:00 p.m.	vs. Troy		Protective Stadium; Birmingham, AL (Birmingham Bowl)	ABC	W 17–10	20,023
*Non-conference game; ^{†}Homecoming; Rankings from AP Poll (and CFP Rankings, after October 31) - Released prior to game; All times are in Eastern time

== Roster ==
2023 Duke Blue Devils football team roster
Players
Coaches
Offense

Pos.	#	Name	Class
WR	2	Sahmir Hagans	So
WR	5	Jalon Calhoun	Sr
WR	6	Eli Pancol	GS
RB	7	Jordan Waters	GS
WR	8	Jordan Moore	Jr
QB	13	Riley Leonard	Jr
WR	14	Que'Sean Brown	Fr
RB	23	Terry Moore	So
OL	53	Brian Parker II	Fr
OL	62	Graham Barton	Sr
OL	63	Jacob Monk	GS
TE	85	Jeremiah Hasley	Fr

Defense

Pos.	#	Name	Class
CB	0	Chandler Rivers	So
N	3	Brandon Johnson	Jr
CB	7	Al Blades Jr.	GS
LB	8	Dorian Mausi	Sr
DT	16	Aeneas Peebles	Sr
DE	19	Vincent Anthony Jr.	So
DT	90	DeWayne Carter	Jr
DE	94	R.J. Oben	Sr
DT	96	Aaron Hall	So
DE	97	Wesley Williams	Fr

Special teams

Pos.	#	Name	Class
K	44	Charlie Ham	GS

Head coach

- Mike Elko

Coordinators/assistant coaches

- Kevin Johns (Offensive coordinator)
- Tyler Santucci (Co-defensive coordinator)
- Lyle Hemphill (Co-defensive coordinator)
- Rich Skrosky (Senior analyst)

Legend

- (C) Team captain
- (S) Suspended
- (I) Ineligible
- Injured
- Redshirt

Roster

== Game summaries ==
=== vs. No. 9 Clemson ===
No. 9 Clemson Tigers (0-0) at Duke Blue Devils (0-0) - Game summary

Quarter	1	2	3	4	Total
No. 9 Clemson	0	7	0	0	7
Duke	3	3	7	15	28

at Wallace Wade Stadium

- Date: September 4
- Game time: 8:00 p.m. EST/5:00 p.m. PST
- Game weather: Clear • Temperature: 83 °F (28 °C) • Wind: 5 mph SE
- Game attendance: 31,638
- Referee: Marcus Woods
- TV announcers (ESPN): Dave Pasch (play-by-play), Dusty Dvoracek (analyst), and Tom Luginbill (sideline)

Game information

First quarter

- 9:19 DUKE - Todd Pelino 22-yard field goal - 3-0 Duke, Drive: 10 plays, 57 yards, 3:26

Second quarter

- 14:19 DUKE - Todd Pelino 42-yard field goal - 6-0 Duke, Drive: 7 plays, 40 yards, 3:34
- 10:09 CLEM - Will Shipley 2-yard pass from Cade Klubnik (Robert Gunn III kick) - 7-6 Clemson, Drive: 5 plays, 18 yards, 2:12

Third quarter

- 12:40 DUKE - Riley Leonard 44-yard run (Todd Pelino kick) - 13-7 Duke, Drive: 5 plays, 75 yards, 2:20

Fourth quarter

- 10:33 DUKE - Jaquez Moore 9-yard run (Riley Leonard two-point pass complete to Jalon Calhoun) - 21-7 Duke, Drive: 6 plays, 33 yards, 3:53
- 3:15 DUKE - Jordan Waters 36-yard run (Todd Pelino kick) - 28-7 Duke, Drive: 4 plays, 49 yards, 1:46

Statistics	No. 9 Clemson	Duke
First downs	29	17
Plays–yards	83–422	64–374
Rushes–yards	40–213	30–199
Passing yards	209	175
Passing: comp–att–int	27–43–1	17–34–0
Turnovers		
Time of possession	33:33	26:27

Team	Category	Player	Statistics
No. 9 Clemson	Passing	Cade Klubnik	27/43, 209 yards, 1 TD, 1 INT
No. 9 Clemson	Rushing	Will Shipley	17 carries, 114 yards
No. 9 Clemson	Receiving	Antonio Williams	7 receptions, 56 yards
Duke	Passing	Riley Leonard	17/33, 175 yards
Duke	Rushing	Riley Leonard	8 carries, 98 yards, 1 TD
Duke	Receiving	Jordan Waters	3 receptions, 46 yards

=== vs. Lafayette ===
Lafayette Leopards (1-0) vs. No. 21 Duke Blue Devils (1-0) - Game summary

Quarter	1	2	3	4	Total
Lafayette	7	0	0	0	7
No. 21 Duke	7	14	14	7	42

at Wallace Wade Stadium

- Date: September 9
- Game time: 6:00 p.m. EST/3:00 p.m. PST
- Game weather: Sunny • Temperature: 78 °F (26 °C) • Wind: 5 mph NW
- Game attendance: 17,481
- Referee: Mike Roche
- TV announcers (ACC Network): Lowell Galindo (play-by-play) and Charles Arbuckle (analyst)

Game information

First quarter

- 11:31 DUKE - Jalon Calhoun 16-yard pass from Riley Leonard (Todd Pelino kick) - 7-0 Duke, Drive: 8 plays, 68 yards, 3:26
- 4:11 LAF - Chris Carasia 12-yard pass from Dean DeNobile (Jack Simonetta kick) - 7-7, Drive: 13 plays, 75 yards, 7:20

Second quarter

- 12:45 DUKE - Jordan Waters 5-yard run (Todd Pelino kick) - 14-7 Duke, Drive: 9 plays, 70 yards, 4:27
- 1:17 DUKE - Jordan Waters 16-yard run (Todd Pelino kick) - 21-7 Duke, Drive: 9 plays, 76 yards, 1:17

Third quarter

- 7:52 DUKE - Jaquez Moore 39-yard run (Todd Pelino kick) - 28-7 Duke, Drive: 8 plays, 84 yards, 3:48
- 1:50 DUKE - Henry Belin IV 1-yard run (Todd Pelino kick) - 35-7 Duke, Drive: 4 plays, 60 yards, 2:13

Fourth quarter

- 13:45 DUKE - Jordan Moore 5-yard pass from Henry Belin IV (Todd Pelino kick) - 42-7 Duke, Drive: 5 plays, 53 yards, 2:17

Statistics	Lafayette	No. 21 Duke
First downs	14	28
Plays–yards	51–213	66–515
Rushes–yards	33–126	45–261
Passing yards	87	254
Passing: comp–att–int	9–18–2	20–21–0
Turnovers		
Time of possession	27:19	32:41

Team	Category	Player	Statistics
Lafayette	Passing	Dean DeNobile	9/17, 87 yards, 1 TD, 2 INT
Lafayette	Rushing	Jamar Curtis	10 carries, 40 yards
Lafayette	Receiving	Elijah Steward	4 receptions, 37 yards
No. 21 Duke	Passing	Riley Leonard	12/12, 136 yards, 1 TD
No. 21 Duke	Rushing	Jordan Waters	11 carries, 112 yards, 2 TD
No. 21 Duke	Receiving	Jordan Moore	4 receptions, 84 yards, 1 TD

=== vs. Northwestern ===
Northwestern Wildcats (1-1) at No. 21 Duke Blue Devils (2-0) - Game summary

Quarter	1	2	3	4	Total
Northwestern	0	7	0	7	14
No. 21 Duke	7	10	14	7	38

at Wallace Wade Stadium

- Date: September 16
- Game time: 3:30 p.m. EST/12:30 p.m. PST
- Game weather: Sunny • Temperature: 82 °F (28 °C) • Wind: 3 mph NE
- Game attendance: 18,141
- Referee: Mark Kluczynski
- TV announcers (ACC Network): Chris Cotter (play-by-play), Mark Herzlich (analyst), and Sherree Burruss (sideline)

Game information

First quarter

- 11:06 DUKE - Jordan Waters 24-yard run (Todd Pelino kick) - 7-0 Duke, Drive: 6 plays, 56 yards, 2:36

Second quarter

- 14:19 DUKE - Jordan Waters 2-yard run (Todd Pelino kick) - 14-0 Duke, Drive: 8 plays, 89 yards, 4:12
- 9:06 DUKE - Todd Pelino 35-yard field goal - 17-0 Duke, Drive: 7 plays, 56 yards, 3:50
- 0:34 NW - A. J. Henning 14-yard pass from Ben Bryant (Jack Olsen kick) - 17-7 Duke, Drive: 15 plays, 73 yards, 8:26

Third quarter

- 10:01 DUKE - Riley Leonard 3-yard run (Todd Pelino kick) - 24-7 Duke, Drive: 9 plays, 80 yards, 4:55
- 3:08 DUKE - Riley Leonard 2-yard run (Todd Pelino kick) - 31-7 Duke, Drive: 12 plays, 94 yards, 5:27

Fourth quarter

- 6:32 DUKE - Peyton Jones 15-yard run (Todd Pelino kick) - 38-7 Duke, Drive: 4 plays, 26 yards, 2:20
- 1:27 NW - Brendan Sullivan 10-yard run (Jack Olsen kick) - 38-14 Duke, Drive: 13 plays, 71 yards, 5:01

Statistics	Northwestern	No. 21 Duke
First downs	19	25
Plays–yards	70–267	60–487
Rushes–yards	30–104	40–268
Passing yards	163	219
Passing: comp–att–int	22–40–1	15–20–0
Turnovers		
Time of possession	28:54	31:06

Team	Category	Player	Statistics
Northwestern	Passing	Ben Bryant	17/34, 123 yards, 1 TD, 1 INT
Northwestern	Rushing	Cam Porter	10 carries, 49 yards
Northwestern	Receiving	Cam Johnson	5 receptions, 45 yards
No. 21 Duke	Passing	Riley Leonard	15/20, 219 yards
No. 21 Duke	Rushing	Riley Leonard	13 carries, 97 yards, 2 TD
No. 21 Duke	Receiving	Jalon Calhoun	5 receptions, 112 yards

=== at UConn ===
No. 18 Duke Blue Devils (3-0) at UConn Huskies (0-3) - Game summary

Quarter	1	2	3	4	Total
No. 18 Duke	7	20	14	0	41
UConn	0	0	0	7	7

at Pratt & Whitney Stadium

- Date: September 23
- Game time: 3:30 p.m. EST/12:30 p.m. PST
- Game weather: Rainy • Temperature: 61 °F (16 °C) • Wind: 12 mph NE
- Game attendance: 29,038
- Referee: Jerry Magalanes
- TV announcers (CBS): Chris Lewis (play-by-play), Robert Turbin (analyst), and Keiana Martin (sideline)

Game information

First quarter

- 6:16 DUKE - Jordan Waters 1-yard run (Todd Pelino kick) - 7-0 Duke, Drive: 5 plays, 44 yards, 1:58

Second quarter

- 12:42 DUKE - Todd Pelino 50-yard field goal - 10-0 Duke, Drive: 13 plays, 63 yards, 6:32
- 12:25 DUKE - Jordan Waters 10-yard run (Todd Pelino kick) - 17-0 Duke, Drive: 1 play, 10 yards, 0:05
- 4:55 DUKE - Riley Leonard 3-yard run (Todd Pelino kick) - 24-0 Duke, Drive: 9 plays, 49 yards, 4:03
- 0:00 DUKE - Todd Pelino 40-yard field goal - 27-0 Duke, Drive: 6 plays, 38 yards, 0:34

Third quarter

- 7:13 DUKE - DeWayne Carter 26-yard fumble return (Todd Pelino kick) - 34-0 Duke, Drive: 2 plays, -1 yard, 0:41
- 3:01 DUKE - Jordan Moore 22-yard pass from Riley Leonard (Todd Pelino kick) - 41-0 Duke, Drive: 5 plays, 60 yards, 3:07

Fourth quarter

- 0:12 CONN - Ta'Quan Roberson 2-yard run (Noe Ruelas kick) - 41-7 Duke, Drive: 10 plays, 83 yards, 3:43

Statistics	No. 18 Duke	UConn
First downs	20	14
Plays–yards	61–328	66–203
Rushes–yards	27–80	38–89
Passing yards	248	114
Passing: comp–att–int	23–34–0	13–28–0
Turnovers		
Time of possession	29:50	30:10

Team	Category	Player	Statistics
No. 18 Duke	Passing	Riley Leonard	23/34, 248 yards, 1 TD
No. 18 Duke	Rushing	Riley Leonard	4 carries, 30 yards, 1 TD
No. 18 Duke	Receiving	Jordan Moore	8 receptions, 86 yards, 1 TD
UConn	Passing	Ta'Quan Roberson	13/28, 114 yards
UConn	Rushing	Victor Rosa	14 carries, 68 yards
UConn	Receiving	Brett Buckman	2 receptions, 31 yards

=== vs. No. 11 Notre Dame ===
No. 11 Notre Dame Fighting Irish (4-1) at No. 17 Duke Blue Devils (4-0) - Game summary

Quarter	1	2	3	4	Total
No. 11 Notre Dame	7	3	3	8	21
No. 17 Duke	0	0	7	7	14

at Wallace Wade Stadium

- Date: September 30
- Game time: 7:30 p.m. EST/4:30 p.m. PST
- Game weather: Sunny • Temperature: 71 °F (22 °C)
- Game attendance: 40,768
- Referee: Riley Johnson
- TV announcers (ABC): Rece Davis (play-by-play), Kirk Herbstreit (analyst), and Holly Rowe (sideline)

Game information

First quarter

- 11:00 ND - Audric Estimé 6-yard run (Spencer Shrader kick) - 7-0 Notre Dame, Drive: 8 plays, 82 yards, 4:00

Second quarter

- 14:56 ND - Spencer Shrader 35-yard field goal - 10-0 Notre Dame, Drive: 4 plays, -4 yards, 1:33

Third quarter

- 9:17 ND - Spencer Shrader 45-yard field goal - 13-0 Notre Dame, Drive: 10 plays, 43 yards, 4:45
- 3:36 DUKE - Jordan Waters 1-yard run (Todd Pelino kick) - 13-7 Notre Dame, Drive: 11 plays, 75 yards, 5:41

Fourth quarter

- 9:17 DUKE - Jordan Moore 3-yard pass from Riley Leonard (Todd Pelino kick) - 14-13 Duke', Drive: 8 plays, 80 yards, 4:27
- 0:31 ND - Audric Estimé 30-yard run (Sam Hartman two-point pass complete to Rico Flores Jr.) - 21-14 Notre Dame, Drive: 10 plays, 95 yards, 2:04

Statistics	No. 11 Notre Dame	No. 17 Duke
First downs	16	17
Plays–yards	63–381	67–323
Rushes–yards	32–159	40–189
Passing yards	222	134
Passing: comp–att–int	15–31–0	12–27–1
Turnovers		
Time of possession	28:15	31:45

Team	Category	Player	Statistics
No. 11 Notre Dame	Passing	Sam Hartman	15/30, 222 yards
No. 11 Notre Dame	Rushing	Audric Estimé	18 carries, 81 yards, 2 TD
No. 11 Notre Dame	Receiving	Mitchell Evans	6 receptions, 134 yards
No. 17 Duke	Passing	Riley Leonard	12/27, 134 yards, 1 TD, 1 INT
No. 17 Duke	Rushing	Riley Leonard	18 carries, 88 yards
No. 17 Duke	Receiving	Jordan Moore	4 receptions, 67 yards, 1 TD

=== vs. NC State ===
NC State Wolfpack (4–2) at No. 17 Duke Blue Devils (4–1) - Game summary

Quarter	1	2	3	4	Total
Wolfpack	3	0	0	0	3
No. 17 Blue Devils	7	10	7	0	24

at Wallace Wade Stadium, Durham, NC

- Date: October 14, 2023
- Game time: 8:00 p.m. EST/5:00 p.m. PST
- Game weather: Cloudy
- Game attendance: 31,833
- Referee: Mike Roche
- TV announcers (ACCN): Wes Durham (play-by-play), Tim Hasselbeck (analyst), and Taylor Tannebaum (sideline)

Game information

First quarter
Second quarter
Third quarter
Fourth quarter

Statistics	NCSU	DUKE
First downs	18	12
Total yards	305	301
Rushing yards	112	194
Passing yards	193	107
Turnovers	1	1
Time of possession	36:56	23:04

Team	Category	Player	Statistics
NC State	Passing	MJ Morris	24–40, 193 yards, 1 INT
NC State	Rushing	MJ Morris	14 rushes, 38 yards
NC State	Receiving	KC Concepcion	6 receptions, 63 yards
Duke	Passing	Henry Belin IV	4–12, 107 yards, 2 TD, 1 INT
Duke	Rushing	Jordan Waters	13 rushes, 123 yards, 1 TD
Duke	Receiving	Jalon Calhoun	1 reception, 69 yards, 1 TD

=== at No. 18 Louisville ===
No. 20 Duke Blue Devils (5–2) at No. 18 Louisville Cardinals (6–1) – Game summary

Quarter	1	2	3	4	Total
No. 20 Duke	0	0	0	0	0
No. 18 Louisville	14	3	6	0	23

at L&N Stadium • Louisville, Kentucky

- Date: October 28
- Game time: 3:30 p.m. EST
- Game weather: Cloudy • Temperature: 63 °F (17 °C) • Wind: 4 mph N
- Game attendance: 52,319
- Referee: Jerry Magallanes
- TV announcers (ESPN): Sean McDonough (play-by-play), Greg McElroy (analyst), Molly McGrath (sideline)

Game information

First quarter

- 7:13 LOU – Jawhar Jordan 14-yard run (Brock Travelstead kick) – 7–0 Louisville, Drive: 10 plays, 72 yards, 5:19
- 1:01 LOU – Jawhar Jordan 23-yard run (Brock Travelstead kick) – 14–0 Louisville, Drive: 6 plays, 49 yards, 3:09

Second quarter

- 0:49 LOU – Brock Travelstead 47-yard field goal – 17–0 Louisville, Drive: 9 plays, 59 yards, 3:49

Third quarter

- 7:32 LOU – Brock Travelstead 20-yard field goal – 20–0 Louisville, Drive: 14 plays, 72 yards, 7:28
- 3:24 LOU – Brock Travelstead 24-yard field goal – 23–0 Louisville, Drive: 4 plays, 8 yards, 2:31

Statistics	DUKE	LOU
First downs	9	20
Plays–yards	49–202	64–351
Rushes–yards	21–51	48–234
Passing yards	151	117
Passing: comp–att–int	12–28–1	11–16–0
Turnovers		
Time of possession	23:09	36:51

Team	Category	Player	Statistics
Duke	Passing	Riley Leonard	9/23, 121 yards, 1 INT
Duke	Rushing	Jordan Waters	5 carries, 23 yards
Duke	Receiving	Jordan Moore	6 receptions, 92 yards
Louisville	Passing	Jack Plummer	11/16, 117 yards
Louisville	Rushing	Jawhar Jordan	21 carries, 163 yards, 2 TD
Louisville	Receiving	Jamari Thrash	7 receptions, 73 yards

=== at No. 24 North Carolina (Victory Bell) ===
No. Duke Blue Devils (6–3) at No. 24 North Carolina Tar Heels (7–2) – Game summary

Quarter	1	2	3	4	OT	2OT	Total
Duke	0	14	0	22	3	6	45
No. 24 North Carolina	10	6	3	17	3	8	47

at Kenan Stadium • Chapel Hill, North Carolina

- Date: November 11
- Game time: 8:06 p.m. EST
- Game weather: Cloudy • Temperature: 51 °F (11 °C) • Wind: 3 mph E
- Game attendance: 50,500
- Referee: Jeff Flanagan
- TV announcers (ACCN): Wes Durham (play-by-play), Tim Hasselbeck (analyst), Taylor Tannenbaum (sideline)

Game information

First quarter

- 10:44 UNC – Drake Maye 1-yard run (Noah Burnette kick) – 7–0 UNC', Drive: 10 plays, 75 yards, 4:16
- 5:53 UNC – Noah Burnette 23-yard field goal – 10–0 UNC', Drive: 11 plays, 67 yards, 3:55

Second quarter

- 11:38 UNC – Noah Burnette 31-yard field goal – 13–0 UNC', Drive: 11 plays, 67 yards, 3:51
- 5:18 DUKE – Jordan Moore 10-yard pass from Grayson Loftis (Todd Pelino kick) – 13–7 UNC', Drive: 9 plays, 70 yards, 6:13
- 2:07 DUKE – Grayson Loftis 3-yard run (Todd Pelino kick) – 14–13 DUKE', Drive: 5 plays, 14 yards, 2:59
- 0:23 UNC – Noah Burnette 25-yard field goal – 16–14 UNC', Drive: 8 plays, 66 yards, 1:39

Third quarter

- 6:49 UNC – Noah Burnette 27-yard field goal – 19–14 UNC', Drive: 16 plays, 55 yards, 6:41

Fourth quarter

- 14:55 UNC – Omarion Hampton 2-yard run (Noah Burnette kick) – 26–14 UNC', Drive: 7 plays, 73 yards, 2:23
- 9:41 DUKE – Jordan Waters 13-yard run (Todd Pelino kick) – 26–21 UNC', Drive: 7 plays, 70 yards, 3:15
- 5:21 DUKE – Jordan Waters 23-yard run (Jalon Calhoun pass from Grayson Loftis) – 29–26 DUKE', Drive: 8 plays, 54 yards, 4:19
- 1:55 UNC – Bryson Nesbit 15-yard pass from Drake Maye (Noah Burnette kick) – 33–29 UNC', Drive: 10 plays, 75 yards, 3:26
- 0:41 DUKE – Jordan Moore 30-yard pass from Grayson Loftis (Todd Pelino kick) – 36–33 DUKE', Drive: 9 plays, 75 yards, 1:14
- 0:00 UNC – Noah Burnette 43-yard field goal – 36–36 TIED', Drive: 6 plays, 50 yards, 0:41

Overtime

- DUKE – Todd Pelino 49-yard field goal – 39–36 DUKE', Drive: 4 plays, -7 yards, 0:00
- UNC – Noah Burnette 24-yard field goal – 39–39 TIED', Drive: 6 plays, 19 yards, 0:00

Double overtime

- UNC – Drake Maye 5-yard run (John Copenhaver pass from Drake Maye) – 47–39 UNC', Drive: 4 plays, 25 yards, 0:00
- DUKE – Jordan Moore 6-yard pass from Grayson Loftis (Jalon Calhoun pass from Grayson Loftis failed) – 47–45 UNC', Drive: 6 plays, 25 yards, 0:00

Statistics	DUKE	UNC
First downs	22	30
Plays–yards	72–379	84–537
Rushes–yards	43–179	44–195
Passing yards	200	342
Passing: comp–att–int	17–29–0	28–43–1
Turnovers		
Time of possession	31:24	28:36

Team	Category	Player	Statistics
Duke	Passing	Grayson Loftis	16/28, 189 yards, 3 TD
Duke	Rushing	Jordan Waters	20 carries, 113 yards, 2 TD
Duke	Receiving	Jordan Moore	6 receptions, 88 yards, 3 TD
North Carolina	Passing	Drake Maye	28/43, 342 yards, TD, INT
North Carolina	Rushing	Omarion Hampton	31 carries, 169 yards, TD
North Carolina	Receiving	Devontez Walker	7 receptions, 162 yards

== Rankings ==
Ranking movements Legend: ██ Increase in ranking ██ Decrease in ranking — = Not ranked RV = Received votes
	Week															
Poll	Pre	1	2	3	4	5	6	7	8	9	10	11	12	13	14	Final
AP	RV	21	21	18	17	19	17	16	20	—	RV	—	—	—	—	RV
Coaches	RV	24	20	18	16	21	18	17	21	RV	RV	—	—	—	—	RV
CFP	Not released									—	—	—	—	—	—	Not released

== Coaching staff ==
Name	Title
Mike Elko	Head coach
Tyler Santucci	Co-defensive coordinator
Lyle Hemphill	Co-defensive coordinator/Safeties coach
Harland Bower	Defensive ends coach
Adam Cushing	Run Game coordinator/offensive line coach
Zohn Burden	Pass game coordinator/wide receivers coach
Kevin Johns	Offensive coordinator/ quarterbacks coach
Patrick Dougherty	Special teams coordinator/tight ends coach
Trooper Taylor	Associate head coach/running backs coach
Ishmael Aristide	Cornerbacks coach
Jess Simpson	Associate head coach/defensive line coach

== Players drafted into the NFL ==
Round	Pick	Player	Position	NFL Club
1	26	Graham Barton	C	Tampa Bay Buccaneers
3	95	DeWayne Carter	DT	Buffalo Bills
5	163	Jacob Monk	C	Green Bay Packers
