= 2022 Duke Blue Devils football team =

American college football season

2022 Duke Blue Devils football

Military Bowl champion

Military Bowl, W 30–13 vs. UCF
- Conference: Atlantic Coast Conference
- Coastal Division
- Record: 9–4 (5–3 ACC)
- Head coach: Mike Elko (1st season)
- Offensive coordinator: Kevin Johns (1st season)
- Offensive scheme: Multiple
- Defensive coordinator: Robb Smith (1st season)
- Base defense: 4–2–5
- Captains: DeWayne Carter; Shaka Heyward; Jacob Monk
- Home stadium: Wallace Wade Stadium

2022 Atlantic Coast Conference football standings
| | Conf. | | | Overall |
| Team | W | | L | W | | L |
|---|---|---|---|---|---|---|
Atlantic Division
| No. 13 Clemson xy$ | 8 | – | 0 | 11 | – | 3 |
| No. 11 Florida State | 5 | – | 3 | 10 | – | 3 |
| Louisville | 4 | – | 4 | 8 | – | 5 |
| NC State | 4 | – | 4 | 8 | – | 5 |
| Syracuse | 4 | – | 4 | 7 | – | 6 |
| Wake Forest | 3 | – | 5 | 8 | – | 5 |
| Boston College | 2 | – | 6 | 3 | – | 9 |
Coastal Division
| North Carolina xy | 6 | – | 2 | 9 | – | 5 |
| Duke | 5 | – | 3 | 9 | – | 4 |
| No. 22 Pittsburgh | 5 | – | 3 | 9 | – | 4 |
| Georgia Tech | 4 | – | 4 | 5 | – | 7 |
| Miami (FL) | 3 | – | 5 | 5 | – | 7 |
| Virginia | 1 | – | 6 | 3 | – | 7 |
| Virginia Tech | 1 | – | 6 | 3 | – | 8 |
Championship: Clemson 39, North Carolina 10
$ – Conference champion; x – Division champion/co-champions; y – Championship game participant; Rankings from AP Poll

The 2022 Duke Blue Devils football team represented Duke University as a member of Coastal Division of the Atlantic Coast Conference (ACC) during the 2022 NCAA Division I FBS football season. Led by first-year head coach Mike Elko, the Blue Devils played home games at Wallace Wade Stadium in Durham, North Carolina.

== Schedule ==
| Date | Time | Opponent | Site | TV | Result | Attendance |
|---|---|---|---|---|---|---|
| September 2 | 7:30 pm | Temple* | Wallace Wade Stadium; Durham, NC | ACCN | W 30–0 | 20,722 |
| September 10 | 11:00 am | at Northwestern* | Ryan Field; Evanston, IL | FS1 | W 31–23 | 24,622 |
| September 17 | 6:00 pm | North Carolina A&T* | Wallace Wade Stadium; Durham, NC | ACCNX/ESPN+ | W 49–20 | 32,802 |
| September 24 | 11:00 am | at Kansas* | David Booth Kansas Memorial Stadium; Lawrence, KS | FS1 | L 27–35 | 47,233 |
| October 1 | 7:30 pm | Virginia | Wallace Wade Stadium; Durham, NC | ACCRSN | W 38–17 | 15,152 |
| October 8 | 4:00 pm | at Georgia Tech | Bobby Dodd Stadium; Atlanta, GA | ACCRSN | L 20–23 ^{OT} | 32,041 |
| October 15 | 8:00 pm | North Carolina | Wallace Wade Stadium; Durham, NC (Victory Bell) | ACCN | L 35–38 | 40,004 |
| October 22 | 12:30 pm | at Miami (FL) | Hard Rock Stadium; Miami, FL | ACCRSN | W 45–21 | 57,421 |
| November 4 | 7:00 pm | at Boston College | Alumni Stadium; Chestnut Hill, Mass | ESPN2 | W 38–31 | 34,092 |
| November 12 | 12:00 p.m. | Virginia Tech | Wallace Wade Stadium; Durham, NC | ACCRSN | W 24–7 | 20,857 |
| November 19 | 12:00 p.m. | at Pittsburgh | Acrisure Stadium; Pittsburgh, PA | ACCN | L 26–28 | 45,362 |
| November 26 | 3:30 p.m. | Wake Forest | Wallace Wade Stadium; Durham, NC (rivalry) | ACCN | W 34–31 | 17,492 |
| December 28 | 2:00 p.m. | vs. UCF* | Navy–Marine Corps Memorial Stadium; Annapolis, MD (Military Bowl) | ESPN | W 30–13 | 17,974 |
*Non-conference game; All times are in Eastern time

== Game summaries ==
=== Temple ===
| | 1 | 2 | 3 | 4 | Total |
|---|---|---|---|---|---|
| Owls | 0 | 0 | 0 | 0 | 0 |
| Blue Devils | 10 | 14 | 3 | 3 | 30 |

=== At Northwestern ===
| | 1 | 2 | 3 | 4 | Total |
|---|---|---|---|---|---|
| Blue Devils | 14 | 7 | 0 | 10 | 31 |
| Wildcats | 0 | 10 | 6 | 7 | 23 |

=== North Carolina A&T ===
| | 1 | 2 | 3 | 4 | Total |
|---|---|---|---|---|---|
| Aggies | 0 | 6 | 0 | 14 | 20 |
| Blue Devils | 21 | 7 | 14 | 7 | 49 |

=== At Kansas ===
| | 1 | 2 | 3 | 4 | Total |
|---|---|---|---|---|---|
| Blue Devils | 7 | 6 | 0 | 14 | 27 |
| Jayhawks | 7 | 14 | 7 | 7 | 35 |

=== Virginia ===
| | 1 | 2 | 3 | 4 | Total |
|---|---|---|---|---|---|
| Cavaliers | 0 | 7 | 3 | 7 | 17 |
| Blue Devils | 14 | 7 | 7 | 10 | 38 |

=== At Georgia Tech ===
| | 1 | 2 | 3 | 4 | OT | Total |
|---|---|---|---|---|---|---|
| Blue Devils | 0 | 3 | 3 | 14 | 0 | 20 |
| Yellow Jackets | 3 | 7 | 7 | 3 | 3 | 23 |

=== North Carolina ===
| | 1 | 2 | 3 | 4 | Total |
|---|---|---|---|---|---|
| Tar Heels | 10 | 7 | 14 | 7 | 38 |
| Blue Devils | 7 | 14 | 0 | 14 | 35 |

=== At Miami ===
| | 1 | 2 | 3 | 4 | Total |
|---|---|---|---|---|---|
| Blue Devils | 0 | 17 | 7 | 21 | 45 |
| Hurricanes | 7 | 0 | 14 | 0 | 21 |

=== At Boston College ===
| | 1 | 2 | 3 | 4 | Total |
|---|---|---|---|---|---|
| Blue Devils | 10 | 14 | 7 | 7 | 38 |
| Eagles | 7 | 7 | 7 | 10 | 31 |

=== Virginia Tech ===
| | 1 | 2 | 3 | 4 | Total |
|---|---|---|---|---|---|
| Hokies | 7 | 0 | 0 | 0 | 7 |
| Blue Devils | 3 | 7 | 7 | 7 | 24 |

=== At Pittsburgh ===
| | 1 | 2 | 3 | 4 | Total |
|---|---|---|---|---|---|
| Blue Devils | 7 | 7 | 0 | 12 | 26 |
| Panthers | 10 | 10 | 0 | 8 | 28 |

=== Wake Forest ===
| | 1 | 2 | 3 | 4 | Total |
|---|---|---|---|---|---|
| Demon Deacons | 7 | 10 | 7 | 7 | 31 |
| Blue Devils | 3 | 17 | 7 | 7 | 34 |

=== Vs. UCF (Military Bowl) ===
| | 1 | 2 | 3 | 4 | Total |
|---|---|---|---|---|---|
| Knights | 7 | 0 | 0 | 6 | 13 |
| Blue Devils | 7 | 13 | 3 | 7 | 30 |

== Roster ==
2022 Duke Blue Devils football team roster
Players
Coaches
Offense

| Pos. | # | Name | Class |
|---|---|---|---|
| WR | 1 | Jontavis Robertson | Jr |
| WR | 2 | Luca Diamont | So |
| WR | 3 | Darrell Harding Jr. | Sr |
| WR | 4 | Nick Lambert | So |
| WR | 5 | Jalon Calhoun | Sr |
| WR | 6 | Eli Pancol | Sr |
| RB | 7 | Jordan Waters | Jr |
| QB, WR | 8 | Jordan Moore | So |
| QB | 9 | Gavin Spurrier | GS |
| QB | 10 | Henry Belvin IV | Fr |
| WR | 11 | Mehki Wall | Fr |
| WR | 12 | Jaden Watkins | Fr |
| QB | 13 | Riley Leonard | So |
| QB | 14 | Ty Lenhart | GS |
| TE | 15 | Jake Taylor | Fr |
| TE | 16 | Cade Anders | Fr |
| WR | 16 | William Robertson | Jr |
| WR | 18 | Malik Bowen-Sims | Jr |
| RB | 19 | Travis Bates | Fr |
| RB | 20 | Jaquez Moore | So |
| RB | 21 | Eric Weatherly | Fr |
| RB | 22 | Jaylen Coleman | Jr |
| WR | 23 | Edwin Barnes III | Jr |
| RB | 23 | Terry Moore | Fr |
| RB | 25 | RaShawn Allen | GS |
| RB | 41 | Grissim Anderson | Jr |
| TE | 46 | Mason Russell | Sr |
| C | 52 | Addison Penn | So |
| OL | 53 | Brian Parker II | Fr |
| OL | 55 | Andre Harris | GS |
| OL | 56 | Steven Nahmias | Fr |
| OT | 62 | Graham Barton | Jr |
| G | 63 | Jacob Monk | Sr |
| G | 64 | Brian Foley | GS |
| C | 65 | Elijah Wroten | Jr |
| OL | 65 | Jack Burns | GS |
| OT | 70 | John Gelotte | Jr |
| G | 71 | Maurice McIntyre | Sr |
| OL | 72 | Matt Craycraft | Fr |
| OL | 74 | Ron Carr | Jr |
| OT | 75 | Calib Perez | So |
| OT | 77 | Justin Pickett | Fr |
| OL | 78 | Chance Lytle | GS |
| TE | 80 | Matt Smith | Jr |
| TE | 81 | Nicky Dalmolin | Jr |
| TE | 82 | Cole Finney | So |
| TE | 83 | Matt Eylander | GS |
| WR | 84 | Trevor Horton | Sr |
| WR | 85 | Sahmir Hagans | Fr |
| WR | 86 | Eric Gallman II | GS |
| WR | 87 | Harrison Wellmann | GS |
| TE | 88 | Andrew Jones | Fr |
| WR | 89 | Joe Hardison | GS |

Defense

| Pos. | # | Name | Class |
|---|---|---|---|
| DB | 0 | Chandler Rivers | Fr |
| DB | 1 | Darius Joiner | GS |
| DB | 2 | Jaylen Stinson | Jr |
| DB | 4 | Cameron Bergeron | So |
| DB | 5 | Datrone Young | GS |
| LB | 8 | Dorian Mausi | Jr |
| DB | 9 | Kenzy Paul | Fr |
| DB | 10 | James Hopson II | Jr |
| DB | 11 | Isaiah Fisher-Smith | Jr |
| LB | 12 | Tre Freeman | Fr |
| DB | 13 | Tony Davis | Jr |
| DB | 14 | Trent Broadnax | Fr |
| DB | 15 | Placide Djungu-Sungu | Fr |
| DB | 17 | Da'Quan Johnson | Jr |
| LB | 18 | Jeremiah Hasley | Fr |
| DE | 19 | Vincent Anthony Jr. | Fr |
| DB | 21 | Khilan Walker | Jr |
| DB | 24 | Nathan Vail | Fr |
| DB | 26 | Joshua Pickett | So |
| DB | 28 | Dylan Merrell | Fr |
| DB | 30 | Brandon Johnson | So |
| DB | 32 | George Wright | Fr |
| DB | 33 | Dawson Andrew | Fr |
| LB | 34 | Sayyid Stevens | Jr |
| LB | 35 | Cam Dillon | GS |
| LB | 36 | Nick Morris Jr. | Fr |
| LB | 38 | Memorable Factor | Fr |
| DE | 39 | Zach Jepson | Fr |
| DE | 40 | Ryan Smith | Jr |
| LB | 42 | Shaka Heyward | Sr |
| LB | 43 | Rocky Shelton II | Sr |
| DT | 51 | Mandela Tobin | Fr |
| LB | 54 | Jason Hoffman | So |
| DT | 55 | Ja'Mion Franklin | Sr |
| DE | 59 | Michael Reese | So |
| DE | 73 | Anthony Hinton | Sr |
| DT | 74 | Michael Larbie | Sr |
| DB | 83 | Brandon Hersh | Jr |
| DT | 90 | DeWayne Carter | Jr |
| DE | 91 | Ahmad Craig | Jr |
| DT | 92 | Aeneas Peebles | Jr |
| DE | 93 | Anthony Nelson | GS |
| DE | 94 | R.J. Oben | Jr |
| DE | 95 | Trey Brown III | Fr |
| DT | 96 | Aaron Hall | Fr |
| DE | 97 | Wesley Williams | Fr |
| DT | 99 | Christian Rorie | Jr |

Special teams

| Pos. | # | Name | Class |
|---|---|---|---|
| LS | 27 | Jack Yates | Fr |
| K | 29 | Todd Pelino | Fr |
| P | 37 | Jackson Hubbard | GS |
| K | 44 | Charlie Ham | Jr |
| LS | 45 | Evan Deckers | GS |
| K | 49 | Connor Wood | So |
| LS | 56 | Casey Donahue | So |
| LS | 57 | Curtis Cooper | So |
| LS | 72 | Jack Griffin | Sr |
| P | 98 | Porter Wilson | Jr |

Head coach

- Mike Elko

Coordinators/assistant coaches

- Kevin Johns – Offensive coordinator / quarterbacks
- Robb Smith – Defensive coordinator / linebackers
- Jess Simpson – Co-defensive coordinator / defensive line
- Trooper Taylor – Associate head coach / running backs
- Ishmael Aristide – Cornerbacks
- Harland Bower – Defensive ends
- Zohn Burden – Pass game coordinator / wide receivers
- Adam Cushing – Run game coordinator / offensive line
- Patrick Dougherty – Special teams coordinator / tight ends
- Lyle Hemphill – Safeties
- Quinn Billerman – Offensive graduate assistant
- Clete Norton – Defensive graduate assistant
- Luke Shively – Offensive graduate assistant
- Zach Sparber – Defensive graduate assistant
- Rich Skrosky – Offensive senior analyst
- Robert Wright – Defensive senior analyst
- Chris Cook – Offensive analyst
- Keith Larson – Special teams analyst
- Dwayne Thomas – Defensive analyst
- Tanner Cotman – Defensive quality control coordinator
- Nicholas Sewak – Offensive quality control coordinator

Legend

- (C) Team captain
- (S) Suspended
- (I) Ineligible
- Injured
- Redshirt

Roster

== Coaching staff ==
| Name | Title |
|---|---|
| Mike Elko | Head coach |
| Robb Smith | Defensive coordinator/linebackers coach |
| Lyle Hemphill | Safeties coach |
| Harland Bower | Defensive ends coach |
| Adam Cushing | Run Game coordinator/offensive line coach |
| Zohn Burden | Pass game coordinator/wide receivers coach |
| Kevin Johns | Offensive coordinator/ quarterbacks coach |
| Patrick Dougherty | Special teams coordinator/tight ends coach |
| Trooper Taylor | Associate head coach/running backs coach |
| Ishmael Aristide | Cornerbacks coach |
| Jess Simpson | Co-defensive coordinator/defensive line coach |

== Rankings ==
Ranking movements Legend: ██ Increase in ranking ██ Decrease in ranking — = Not ranked RV = Received votes
| | Week | | | | | | | | | | | | | | | |
| Poll | Pre | 1 | 2 | 3 | 4 | 5 | 6 | 7 | 8 | 9 | 10 | 11 | 12 | 13 | 14 | Final |
|---|---|---|---|---|---|---|---|---|---|---|---|---|---|---|---|---|
| AP | — | — | — | — | — | — | — | — | — | — | — | RV | — | — | — | RV |
| Coaches | — | — | — | RV | — | RV | — | — | — | — | — | RV | — | RV | RV | RV |
| CFP | Not released | | | | | | | | | — | — | — | — | — | — | Not released |
