= DeWayne Carter =

American football player (born 2000)

Dewayne Carter
No. 90 – Buffalo Bills
- Position: Defensive tackle
- Roster status: Active

Personal information
- Born: December 10, 2000 (age 25); Pickerington, Ohio, U.S.
- Listed height: 6 ft 2 in (1.88 m)
- Listed weight: 302 lb (137 kg)

Career information
- High school: Pickerington Central
- College: Duke (2019–2023)
- NFL draft: 2024: 3rd round, 95th overall pick

Career history
- Buffalo Bills (2024–present)

Awards and highlights
- First-team All-ACC (2023); Second-team All-ACC (2022); Third-team All-ACC (2021)

Career NFL statistics as of Week 11, 2026
- Tackles: 34
- Sacks: 1
- Pass deflections: 2
- Stats at Pro Football Reference

DeWayne Carter (born December 10, 2000) is an American professional football defensive tackle for the Buffalo Bills of the National Football League (NFL). He played college football for the Duke Blue Devils.

== Early life ==
Carter grew up in Pickerington, Ohio and attended Pickerington Central High School. He was named All-Metro Team Defensive Player of the Year by The Columbus Dispatch after finishing his senior year with 83 tackles with eight being for a loss, and five sacks. Carter committed to play college football at Duke.

== College career ==
In Carter's first season he recorded just one tackle versus Alabama. In 2020, he tallied 11 tackles with 2.5 going for a loss, and a sack, along with one reception for 11 yards. Carter had a career performance in week three, tallying three tackles, one sack, and two forced fumbles in Duke's win over Northwestern. He finished the 2021 season with 36 tackles and 7.5 going for a loss, 4.5 sacks, three pass deflections, and four forced fumbles. For his performance, Carter earned third-team all-Atlantic Coast Conference (ACC) honors. He opened the 2022 season strong, as in week two he tallied four tackles with one being for a loss, a sack, and a forced fumble, as he would help the Blue Devils beat Northwestern 31–23. In week eight, Carter racked up two tackles with one being for a loss, a fumble recovery, and a forced fumble in a 45–21 win over Miami. In their next game, he totaled five tackles with two going for a loss, and two sacks, as he helped the Blue Devils beat Boston College and become bowl eligible for the first time since 2018. Carter finished the 2022 season with 36 tackles and 11 being for a loss, 5.5 sacks, four pass deflections, three fumble recoveries, three forced fumbles, and a touchdown. For his performance, he earned second-team all-ACC honors. Ahead of the 2023 season, Carter was named to the preseason all ACC first team, as well as to the Bronco Nagurski award preseason watch list.

== Professional career ==
Pre-draft measurables
Height	Weight	Arm length	Hand span	Wingspan	40-yard dash	10-yard split	20-yard split	20-yard shuttle	Three-cone drill	Vertical jump	Broad jump	Bench press
6 ft 2 3/8 in (1.89 m)	302 lb (137 kg)	33 in (0.84 m)	10 1/4 in (0.26 m)	6 ft 7 1/8 in (2.01 m)	4.99 s	1.72 s	2.87 s	4.75 s	7.95 s	32.0 in (0.81 m)	9 ft 1 in (2.77 m)	24 reps
All values from NFL Combine/Pro Day

Carter was selected by the Buffalo Bills with the 95th overall pick in the third round in the 2024 NFL draft. He made 11 appearances (three starts) for Buffalo during his rookie campaign, recording one pass deflection and 14 combined tackles.

On August 31, 2025, Carter was ruled out for the season after suffering a torn Achilles tendon.
