= 2022 Miami Hurricanes football team =

American college football season

2022 Miami Hurricanes football
- Conference: Atlantic Coast Conference
- Coast Division
- Record: 5–7 (3–5 ACC)
- Head coach: Mario Cristobal (1st season)
- Offensive coordinator: Josh Gattis (1st season)
- Offensive scheme: Pro spread
- Defensive coordinator: Kevin Steele (1st season)
- Co-defensive coordinator: Charlie Strong (1st season)
- Base defense: 4–3
- Home stadium: Hard Rock Stadium

Uniform
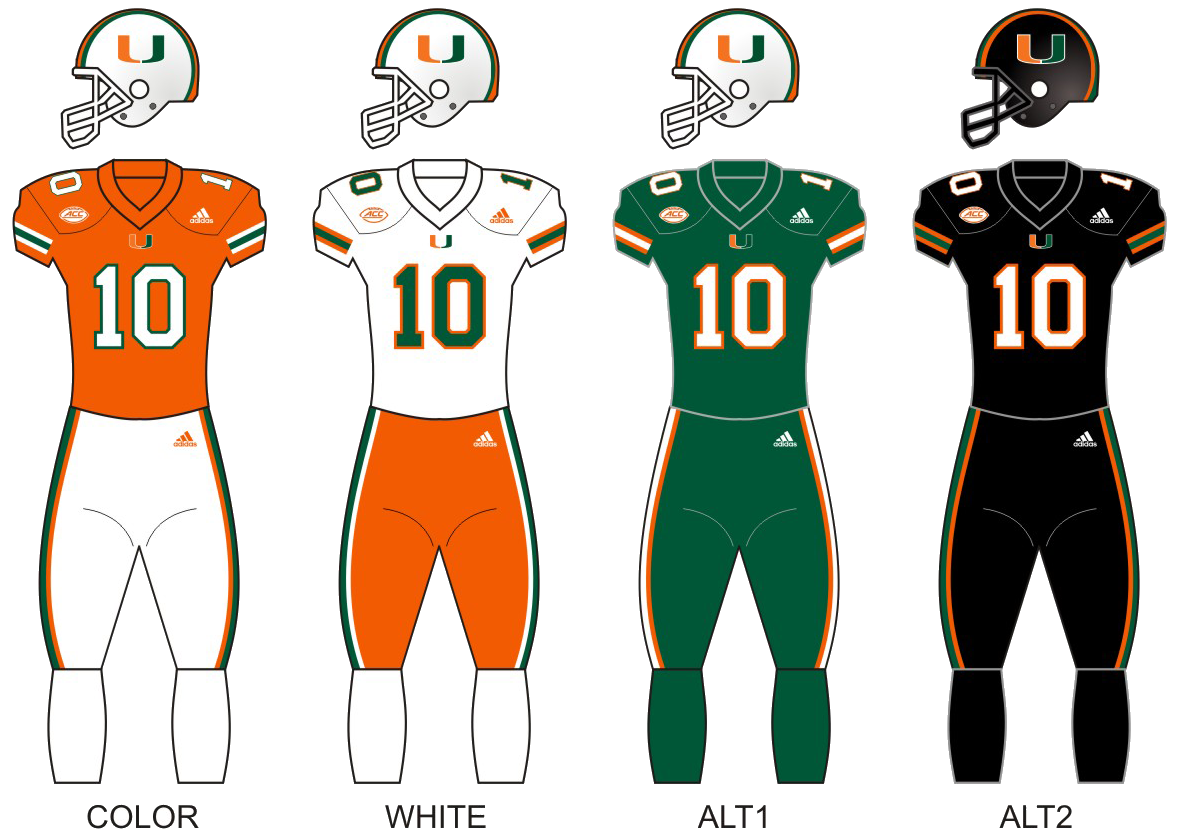

2022 Atlantic Coast Conference football standings
	Conf.			Overall
Team	W		L	W		L
Atlantic Division
No. 13 Clemson xy$	8	–	0	11	–	3
No. 11 Florida State	5	–	3	10	–	3
Louisville	4	–	4	8	–	5
NC State	4	–	4	8	–	5
Syracuse	4	–	4	7	–	6
Wake Forest	3	–	5	8	–	5
Boston College	2	–	6	3	–	9
Coastal Division
North Carolina xy	6	–	2	9	–	5
Duke	5	–	3	9	–	4
No. 22 Pittsburgh	5	–	3	9	–	4
Georgia Tech	4	–	4	5	–	7
Miami (FL)	3	–	5	5	–	7
Virginia	1	–	6	3	–	7
Virginia Tech	1	–	6	3	–	8
Championship: Clemson 39, North Carolina 10
$ – Conference champion; x – Division champion/co-champions; y – Championship game participant; Rankings from AP Poll

The 2022 Miami Hurricanes football team (variously "Miami", "The U", "UM", "'Canes",) represented the University of Miami during the 2022 NCAA Division I FBS football season. The Hurricanes were led by first-year head coach Mario Cristobal, and played their home games at Hard Rock Stadium, competing as a member of the Atlantic Coast Conference (ACC).

== 2022 NFL draft ==
One Hurricane player, Jonathan Ford, a defensive lineman, was selected in the 2022 NFL Draft (by the Green Bay Packers).

Round	Pick	Player	Position	NFL team
7	234	Jonathan Ford	DT	Green Bay Packers

== Roster ==
2022 Miami Hurricanes football team roster
Players
Coaches
Offense

Pos.	#	Name	Class
WR	0	Romello Brinson	So
RB	2	Donald Chaney Jr.	Fr
RB	4	Jaylan Knighton	So
WR	5	Key'Shawn Smith	So
RB	6	TreVonte' Citizen	Fr
WR	7	Xavier Restrepo	So
WR	8	Frank Ladson Jr.	Sr
QB	9	Tyler Van Dyke	So
QB	11	Jacurri Brown	Fr
WR	12	Brashard Smith	So
QB	13	Jake Garcia	Fr
WR	15	Jacolby George	Jr
WR	16	Isaiah Horton	Fr
QB	17	Peyton Matocha	So
QB	19	Jayden George	Jr
RB	20	Terrell Walden II	Fr
RB	21	Henry Parrish Jr.	Jr
RB	22	Thaddius Franklin Jr.	So
TE	23	Jaleel Skinner	So
RB	24	Lucious Stanley	GS
RB	30	Mike Peraino	Fr
WR	35	Josh Murillo	Jr
TE	41	Seth Parrott	Fr
RB	43	Isaiah Cashwell	Jr
RB	44	Syncere Sampson	Fr
RB	46	Devon Perry	Sr
WR	47	Bryson Robertson	Fr
TE	48	Robert Prosek	So
OL	50	Laurence Seymour	So
OL	51	D. J. Scaife Jr.	Sr
OL	53	Jakai Clark	Jr
OL	55	Anez Cooper	Fr
OL	56	Jonathan Denis	Jr
OL	57	Matt Antezana	So
OL	60	Zion Nelson	Jr
OL	64	Jalen Rivers	Fr
OL	66	Ousman Traore	Jr
OL	68	Ian Johnson	Fr
OL	69	Johnnie Brown	Fr
OL	70	Justice Oluwaseun	Sr
OL	71	Jared Griffith	Jr
OL	72	Chris Washington	Fr
OL	74	John Campbell Jr.	Jr
OL	75	Zalon'tae Hillery	Jr
OL	76	Ryan Rodriguez	Fr
OL	77	Logan Sagapolu	Fr
OL	78	Matthew McCoy	Fr
OL	79	Michael McLaughlin	Fr
TE	80	Elijah Arroyo	So
TE	81	Kahlil Brantley	Fr
WR	81	Zaire Cox	Fr
WR	83	Michael Redding III	So
WR	84	Jefferson Walls	Jr
TE	85	Will Mallory	Sr
TE	86	Dominic Mammarelli	Fr
TE	87	Gabriel Valladares	Fr
WR	88	Colbie Young	Jr

Defense

Pos.	#	Name	Class
S	0	James Williams	So
CB	2	Tyrique Stevenson	Jr
DB	3	Gilbert Frierson	Jr
LB	4	Keontra Smith	Jr
DB	5	Daryl Porter Jr.	So
DL	6	Darrell Jackson Jr.	So
CB	7	Al Blades Jr.	Jr
CB	8	D. J. Ivey	Sr
LB	9	Avery Huff	So
LB	11	Corey Flagg Jr.	So
DL	12	Jahfari Harvey	So
DL	13	Chantz Williams	Jr
S	15	Avantae Williams	So
CB	16	Malik Curtis	Jr
LB	17	Waynmon Steed Jr.	Sr
DB	18	Markeith Williams	Fr
DB	19	Jaden Harris	Fr
S	20	Jalen Harrell	Fr
CB	21	Khamauri Rogers	Fr
DB	22	Chris Graves Jr.	Fr
CB	23	Te'Corey Couch	Sr
S	24	Kamren Kinchens	Jr
S	25	Keshawn Washington	Fr
S	27	Brian Balom	So
CB	29	Isaiah Dunson	So
LB	31	Wesley Bissainthe	Fr
DL	32	Nyjalik Kelly	So
LB	33	Wade Gullickson	Fr
LB	34	Ryan Ragone	Jr
LB	35	Michael Suarez	So
CB	36	Luis Gutierrez Jr.	So
LB	37	Emmanuel Houvardas	So
DB	38	Myles Mooyoung	Fr
DL	39	Cyrus Moss	Fr
LB	40	Caleb Johnson	Sr
LB	41	Chase Smith	So
DB	43	Souleymane Bangoura	Jr
DL	44	Antonio Moultrie	Sr
DL	45	Mitchell Agude	Sr
DL	45	Bryan Levine	So
DB	46	Nick Kelly	Fr
LB	48	Jake Hoffman	So
DB	49	John Yayi-Bondje	Fr
LB	50	Andrew Saint Fleur	GS
LB	53	Lucas Peterson	So
DL	55	Jacob Lichtenstein	Sr
DL	56	Leonard Taylor III	So
DL	69	Trent Scheuerman	Fr
DL	81	Jared Harrison-Hunte	So
DL	84	Josh Neely	So
DL	90	Akheem Mesidor	Jr
DL	91	Jordan Miller	Jr
DL	92	Ahmad Moten	Fr
DE	93	Jabari Ishmael	Fr
DE	95	Thomas Davis	Fr
DL	97	Allan Haye Jr.	Fr
DL	99	Elijah Roberts	So

Special teams

Pos.	#	Name	Class
K	30	Andrés Borregales	So
LS	49	Mason Napper	So
LS	58	Clay James	Jr
LS	59	Gabe Landers	Fr
K/P	85	Sebastian Przytula	Fr
P	86	Fred Potter	Fr
K	92	Trevor Walden	Fr
P	94	Lou Hedley	Sr
P	97	Will Hutchinson	Fr

Head coach

- Mario Cristobal

Coordinators/assistant coaches

- Kevin Steele – Defensive Coordinator
- Alex Mirabal – Assistant Head Coach/Offensive Line
- Joe Salave'a – Defensive Line/Defensive Run Game Coordinator
- Charlie Strong – Co-Defensive Coordinator/Linebackers
- Jahmile Addae – Secondary
- Stephen Field – Tight Ends
- Rod Wright – Defensive Ends
- Aaron Feld – Director, Strength and Conditioning

Legend

- (C) Team captain
- (S) Suspended
- (I) Ineligible
- Injured
- Redshirt

Roster

== Schedule ==
Date	Time	Opponent	Rank	Site	TV	Result	Attendance
September 3	3:30 p.m.	Bethune–Cookman*	No. 16	Hard Rock Stadium; Miami Gardens, FL	ACCN	W 70–13	56,795
September 10	12:00 p.m.	Southern Miss*	No. 15	Hard Rock Stadium; Miami Gardens, FL	ACCN	W 30–7	46,422
September 17	9:00 p.m.	at No. 24 Texas A&M*	No. 13	Kyle Field; College Station, TX	ESPN	L 9–17	107,245
September 24	3:30 p.m.	Middle Tennessee*	No. 25	Hard Rock Stadium; Miami Gardens, FL	ACCN	L 31–45	46,713
October 8	4:00 p.m.	North Carolina		Hard Rock Stadium; Miami Gardens, FL	ESPN2	L 24–27	53,751
October 15	12:30 p.m.	at Virginia Tech		Lane Stadium; Blacksburg, VA (rivalry)	ACCRSN	W 20–14	65,632
October 22	12:30 p.m.	Duke		Hard Rock Stadium; Miami Gardens, FL	ACCRSN	L 21–45	57,421
October 29	12:30 p.m.	at Virginia		Scott Stadium; Charlottesville, VA	ACCRSN	W 14–12 ^{4OT}	43,714
November 5	7:30 p.m.	Florida State		Hard Rock Stadium; Miami Gardens, FL (rivalry)	ABC	L 3–45	66,200
November 12	3:30 p.m.	at Georgia Tech		Bobby Dodd Stadium; Atlanta, GA	ACCRSN	W 35–14	33,857
November 19	3:30 p.m.	at No. 9 Clemson		Memorial Stadium; Clemson, SC	ESPN	L 10–40	81,340
November 26	8:00 p.m.	Pittsburgh		Hard Rock Stadium; Miami Gardens, FL	ACCN	L 16–42	46,428
*Non-conference game; Rankings from AP Poll released prior to the game; All times are in Eastern time

== Rankings ==
Ranking movements Legend: ██ Increase in ranking ██ Decrease in ranking — = Not ranked
	Week															
Poll	Pre	1	2	3	4	5	6	7	8	9	10	11	12	13	14	Final
AP	16	15	13	25	—	—	—	—	—	—	—	—	—	—	—	—
Coaches	17	16	13	25	—	—	—	—	—	—	—	—	—	—	—	—
CFP	Not released									—	—	—	—	—	—	Not released

== Game summaries ==
=== Bethune–Cookman ===
Game One – Bethune–Cookman Wildcats (0–0) at #16 Miami Hurricanes (0–0)

Quarter	1	2	3	4	Total
Wildcats	3	7	3	0	13
No. 16 Hurricanes	14	28	14	14	70

at Hard Rock Stadium • Miami Gardens, Florida

- Date: Saturday, September 3, 2022
- Game time: 3:30 p.m. EST
- Game weather: Sunny • Temperature: 91 °F (33 °C)
- TV announcers (ACCN): Jorge Sedano (play-by-play), Forrest Conoly (analyst), & Marilyn Payne (sideline)

Game information

First quarter

- (8:54) BCU – Dylan Moghaddam 29-yard field goal (Drive: 10 plays, 63 yards, 6:06; Bethune-Cookman 3–0)
- (7:00) MIA – Thaddius Franklin Jr. 4-yard run, Andrés Borregales kick (Drive: 5 plays, 30 yards, 1:54; Miami 7–3)
- (0:36) MIA – Henry Parrish Jr. 5-yard run, Andrés Borregales kick (Drive: 11 plays, 61 yards, 4:56; Miami 14–3)

Second quarter

- (12:06) MIA – Henry Parrish Jr. 6-yard run, Andrés Borregales kick (Drive: 4 plays, 85 yards, 1:23; Miami 21–3)
- (11:50) MIA – Tyrone Franklin Jr. 30-yard interception return, Andrés Borregales kick (Miami 28–3)
- (6:34) BCU – Que'shaun Byrd 34-yard pass from Jalon Jones, Dylan Moghaddam kick (Drive: 9 plays, 75 yards, 5:16; Miami 28–10)
- (4:19) MIA – Xavier Restrepo 16-yard pass from Tyler Van Dyke, Andrés Borregales kick (Drive: 5 plays, 54 yards, 2:15; Miami 35–10)
- (0:39) MIA – Henry Parrish Jr. 5-yard run, Andrés Borregales kick (Drive: 5 plays, 51 yards, 1:10; Miami 42–10)

Third quarter

- (10:30) BCU – Dylan Moghaddam 21-yard field goal, (Drive: 9 plays, 90 yards, 2:43; Miami 42–13)
- (7:26) MIA – Michael Redding III 16-yard pass from Tyler Van Dyke, Andrés Borregales kick (Drive: 7 plays, 73 yards, 3:04; Miami 49–13)
- (2:42) MIA – Thaddius Franklin Jr. 4-yard run, Andrés Borregales kick (Drive: 7 plays, 81 yards, 3:23; Miami 56–13)

Fourth quarter

- (14:55) MIA – Devon Perry 4-yard run, Andrés Borregales kick (Drive: 3 plays, 23 yards, 0:47; Miami 63–13)
- (6:48) MIA – Terrell Walden II 2-yard run, Andrés Borregales kick (Drive: 10 plays, 48 yards, 6:15; Miami 70–13)

Statistics	BCU	MIA
First downs	13	29
Plays–yards	56–342	65–581
Rushes–yards	29–93	42–300
Passing yards	249	281
Passing: comp–att–int	14–27–3	20–23–0
Turnovers		
Time of possession	28:39	26:54

Team	Category	Player	Statistics
Bethune-Cookman	Passing	Jalon Jones	13/20, 243 yards, TD, INT
Bethune-Cookman	Rushing	Tyrone Franklin Jr.	4 carries, 30 yards
Bethune-Cookman	Receiving	Dylaan Lee	5 receptions, 83 yards
Miami	Passing	Tyler Van Dyke	13/16, 193 yards, 2 TD
Miami	Rushing	Henry Parrish Jr.	14 carries, 108 yards, 3 TD
Miami	Receiving	Xavier Restrepo	5 receptions, 100 yards, TD

=== Southern Miss ===
Game Two – Southern Miss Golden Eagles (0–1) at #15 Miami Hurricanes (1–0)

Quarter	1	2	3	4	Total
Golden Eagles	0	7	0	0	7
No. 15 Hurricanes	3	7	14	6	30

at Hard Rock Stadium • Miami Gardens, Florida

- Date: Saturday, September 10, 2022
- Game time: 12:00 p.m. EST
- Game weather: Sunny • Temperature: 85 °F (29 °C)
- TV announcers (ACCN): Chris Cotter (play-by-play), Mark Herzlich (analyst), & Lericia Harris (sideline)

Game information

First quarter

- (1:39) MIA – Andrés Borregales 30-yard field goal (Drive: 16 plays, 68 yards, 6:14; Miami 3–0)

Second quarter

- (14:30) USM – Jason Brownlee 32-yard pass from Zach Wilcke, Briggs Bourgeois kick (Drive: 6 plays, 75 yards, 2:09; Southern Miss 7–3)
- (0:20) MIA – Henry Parrish Jr. 1-yard run, Andrés Borregales kick (Drive: 10 plays, 86 yards, 2:52; Miami 10–7)

Third quarter

- (7:10) MIA – Thaddius Franklin Jr. 7-yard run, Andrés Borregales kick (Drive: 13 plays, 77 yards, 6:11; Miami 17–7)
- (4:56) MIA – Key'Shawn Smith 35-yard pass from Tyler Van Dyke, Andrés Borregales kick (Drive: 1 play, 35 yards, 0:06; Miami 24–7)

Fourth quarter

- (9:11) MIA – Andrés Borregales 33-yard field goal (Drive: 12 plays, 44 yards, 5:30; Miami 27–7)
- (3:34) MIA – Andrés Borregales 48-yard field goal (Drive: 7 plays, 14 yards, 3:50; Miami 30–7)

Statistics	USM	MIA
First downs	12	23
Plays–yards	50–240	78–451
Rushes–yards	24–33	49–173
Passing yards	207	278
Passing: comp–att–int	16–27–1	23–32–1
Turnovers		
Time of possession	23:00	37:00

Team	Category	Player	Statistics
Southern Miss	Passing	Zach Wilcke	16/27, 207 yards, TD, INT
Southern Miss	Rushing	Zach Wilcke	12 carries, 29 yards
Southern Miss	Receiving	Jason Brownlee	5 receptions, 102 yards, TD
Miami	Passing	Tyler Van Dyke	21/30, 263 yards, TD, INT
Miami	Rushing	Henry Parrish Jr.	24 carries, 116 yards, TD
Miami	Receiving	Xavier Restrepo	6 receptions, 72 yards

=== No. 24 Texas A&M ===
Game Three – #13 Miami Hurricanes (2–0) at #24 Texas A&M Aggies (1–1)

Quarter	1	2	3	4	Total
No. 13 Hurricanes	3	0	3	3	9
No. 24 Aggies	10	0	7	0	17

at Kyle Field • College Station, Texas

- Date: Saturday, September 17, 2022
- Game time: 9:00 p.m. EST
- Game weather: Partly Cloudy • Temperature: 86 °F (30 °C)
- Game attendance: 107,245
- Referee: Jeff Heaser
- TV announcers (ESPN): Chris Fowler (play-by-play), Kirk Herbstreit (analyst), Holly Rowe, & Todd McShay (sidelines)

Game information

First quarter

- (11:32) TA&M – Randy Bond 26-yard field goal (Drive: 8 plays, 55 yards, 3:28; Texas A&M 3–0)
- (6:34) MIA – Andrés Borregales 28-yard field goal (Drive: 12 plays, 65 yards, 4:58; Tied 3–3)
- (3:00) TA&M – LJ Johnson Jr. 1-yard run, Randy Bond kick (Drive: 3 plays, 28 yards, 1:14; Texas A&M 10–3)

Second quarter

- No scoring plays

Third quarter

- (10:29) TA&M – De’Von Achane 25-yard pass from Max Johnson, Randy Bond (Drive: 4 plays, 76 yards, 1:58; Texas A&M 17–3)
- (4:04) MIA – Andrés Borregales 22-yard field goal (Drive: 12 plays, 71 yards, 6:25; Texas A&M 17–6)

Fourth quarter

- (8:32) MIA – Andrés Borregales 34-yard field goal (Drive: 16 plays, 82 yards, 6:19; Texas A&M 17–9)

Statistics	MIA	TA&M
First downs	27	16
Plays–yards	82–392	53–264
Rushes–yards	36–175	32–124
Passing yards	217	140
Passing: comp–att–int	21–41–0	10–20–0
Turnovers		
Time of possession	34:20	25:40

Team	Category	Player	Statistics
Miami	Passing	Tyler Van Dyke	21/41, 217 yards
Miami	Rushing	Henry Parrish Jr.	16 carries, 85 yards
Miami	Receiving	Will Mallory	6 receptions, 56 yards
Texas A&M	Passing	Max Johnson	10/20, 140 yards, TD
Texas A&M	Rushing	De’Von Achane	18 carries, 85 yards
Texas A&M	Receiving	Ainias Smith	4 receptions, 74 yards

=== Middle Tennessee ===
Game Four – Middle Tennessee Blue Raiders (2–1) at #25 Miami Hurricanes (2–1)

Quarter	1	2	3	4	Total
Blue Raiders	17	7	7	14	45
No. 25 Hurricanes	3	7	7	14	31

at Hard Rock Stadium • Miami Gardens, Florida

- Date: Saturday, September 24, 2022
- Game time: 3:30 p.m. EST
- Game weather: Partly Cloudy • Temperature: 88 °F (31 °C)
- TV announcers (ACCN): Chris Cotter (play-by-play), Mark Herzlich (analyst), & Lericia Harris (sideline)

Game information

First quarter

- (10:46) MTSU – Zeke Rankin 28-yard field goal (Drive: 4 plays, 2 yards, 0:59; Middle Tennessee 3–0)
- (10:04) MTSU – Zaylin Wood 15-yard interception return, Zeke Rankin kick (Middle Tennessee 10–0)
- (4:52) MIA – Andrés Borregales 39-yard field goal (Drive: 11 plays, 47 yards, 3:06; Middle Tennessee 10–3)
- (4:21) MTSU – DJ England-Chisolm 71-yard pass from Chase Cunningham, Zeke Rankin kick (Drive: 2 plays, 75 yards, 0:31; Middle Tennessee 17–3)

Second quarter

- (12:17) MTSU – Chase Cunningham 9-yard run, Zeke Rankin kick (Drive: 5 plays, 94 yards, 1:54; Middle Tennessee 24–3)
- (1:20) MIA – Henry Parrish Jr. 6-yard pass from Tyler Van Dyke, Andrés Borregales kick (Drive: 14 plays, 87 yards, 6:37; Middle Tennessee 24–10)

Third quarter

- (8:01) MTSU – Elijah Metcalf 69-yard pass from Chase Cunningham, Zeke Rankin kick (Drive: 2 plays, 76 yards, 0:42; Middle Tennessee 31–10)
- (6:08) MIA – Thaddius Franklin Jr. 1-yard run, Andrés Borregales kick (Drive: 5 plays, 72 yards, 1:53; Middle Tennessee 31–17)

Fourth quarter

- (14:45) MTSU – DJ England-Chisolm 99-yard pass from Chase Cunningham, Zeke Rankin kick (Drive: 1 plays, 99 yards, 0:11; Middle Tennessee 38–17)
- (14:34) MIA – Key'Shawn Wood 91-yard kickoff return, Andrés Borregales kick (Middle Tennessee 38–24)
- (8:42) MTSU – Frank Peasant 1-yard run, Zeke Rankin kick (Drive: 12 plays, 75 yards, 5:52; Middle Tennessee 45–24)
- (6:05) MIA – Thaddius Franklin Jr. 1-yard run, Andrés Borregales kick (Drive: 9 plays, 35 yards, 2:37; Middle Tennessee 45–31)

Statistics	MTSU	Miami
First downs	15	26
Plays–yards	61–507	89–367
Rushes–yards	36–99	38–60
Passing yards	408	307
Passing: comp–att–int	16–25–1	26–51–2
Turnovers		
Time of possession	26:13	33:47

Team	Category	Player	Statistics
Middle Tennessee	Passing	Chase Cunningham	16/25, 408 yards, 3 TD, INT
Middle Tennessee	Rushing	Frank Peasant	19 carries, 74 yards, TD
Middle Tennessee	Receiving	DJ England-Chisolm	2 receptions, 169 yards, 2 TD
Miami	Passing	Jake Garcia	10/19, 169 yards
Miami	Rushing	Henry Parrish Jr.	14 carries, 57 yards
Miami	Receiving	Key'Shawn Smith	4 receptions, 81 yards

=== North Carolina ===
Game Five – North Carolina Tar Heels (4–1) at Miami Hurricanes (2–2)

Quarter	1	2	3	4	Total
Tar Heels	7	14	3	3	27
Hurricanes	0	17	0	7	24

at Hard Rock Stadium • Miami Gardens, Florida

- Date: Saturday, October 8, 2022
- Game time: 4:00 p.m. EST
- Game weather: Partly Cloudy • Temperature: 86 °F (30 °C)
- TV announcers (ESPN2): Dave Pasch (play-by-play), Dusty Dvoracek (analyst), & Tom Luginbill (sideline)

Game information

First quarter

- (8:55) UNC – J.J. Jones 74-yard pass from Drake Maye, Noah Burnette kick (Drive: 6 plays, 95 yards, 2:30; North Carolina 7–0)

Second quarter

- (8:44) UNC – Omarion Hampton 2-yard run, Noah Burnette kick (Drive: 8 plays, 99 yards, 2:44; North Carolina 14–0)
- (5:50) MIA – Key'Shawn Smith 20-yard pass from Tyler Van Dyke, Andrés Borregales kick (Drive: 6 plays, 76 yards, 2:54; North Carolina 14–7)
- (1:31) UNC – Josh Downs 15-yard pass from Drake Maye, Noah Burnette kick (Drive: 11 plays, 75 yards, 4:19; North Carolina 21–7)
- (0:28) MIA – Henry Parrish Jr. 7-yard pass from Tyler Van Dyke, Andrés Borregales kick (Drive: 9 plays, 72 yards, 1:03; North Carolina 21–14)
- (0:00) MIA – Andrés Borregales 38-yard field goal, (Drive: 3 plays, 29 yards, 0:21; North Carolina 21–17)

Third quarter

- (7:58) UNC – Noah Burnette 38-yard field goal, (Drive: 7 plays, 24 yards, 3:04; North Carolina 24–17)

Fourth quarter

- (4:10) UNC – Noah Burnette 19-yard field goal, (Drive: 18 plays, 81 yards, 8:21; North Carolina 27–17)
- (2:20) MIA – Colbie Young 16-yard pass from Tyler Van Dyke, Andrés Borregales kick (Drive: 7 plays, 63 yards, 1:50; North Carolina 27–24)

Statistics	UNC	Miami
First downs	21	29
Plays–yards	71–470	81–539
Rushes–yards	43–161	24–43
Passing yards	309	496
Passing: comp–att–int	19–28–2	42–57–1
Turnovers		
Time of possession	31:14	28:46

Team	Category	Player	Statistics
North Carolina	Passing	Drake Maye	19/28, 309 yards, 2 TD, 2 INT
North Carolina	Rushing	Caleb Hood	13 carries, 74 yards
North Carolina	Receiving	J.J. Jones	2 receptions, 80 yards, TD
Miami	Passing	Tyler Van Dyke	42/47, 496 yards, 3 TD, INT
Miami	Rushing	Henry Parrish Jr.	11 carries, 19 yards
Miami	Receiving	Will Mallory	8 receptions, 115 yards

=== Virginia Tech ===
Game Six – Miami Hurricanes (2–3) at Virginia Tech Hokies (2–4)

Quarter	1	2	3	4	Total
Hurricanes	10	7	3	0	20
Hokies	0	0	0	14	14

at Lane Stadium • Blacksburg, Virginia

- Date: Saturday, October 15, 2022
- Game time: 12:30 p.m. EST
- Game weather: Partly Cloudy • Temperature: 48 °F (9 °C)
- Game attendance: 65,632
- Referee: Marcus Wood
- TV announcers (ACCRSN): Tom Werme (play-by-play), James Bates (analyst), & Wiley Ballard (sideline)

Game information

First quarter

- (12:05) MIA – Frank Ladson Jr. 5-yard pass from Tyler Van Dyke, Andrés Borregales kick (Drive: 4 plays, 65 yards, 1:32; Miami 7–0)
- (3:02) MIA – Andrés Borregales 28-yard field goal (Drive: 18 plays, 71 yards, 7:42; Miami 10–0)

Second quarter

- (5:28) MIA – Colbie Young 17-yard pass from Tyler Van Dyke, Andrés Borregales kick (Drive: 8 plays, 80 yards, 2:29; Miami 17–0)

Third quarter

- (3:54) MIA – Andrés Borregales 25-yard field goal (Drive: 6 plays, 43 yards, 2:26; Miami 20–0)

Fourth quarter

- (12:10) VT – Malachi Thomas 14-yard pass from Grant Wells, William Ross kick (Drive: 7 plays, 65 yards, 2:50; Miami 20–7)
- (5:28) VT – Grant Wells 3-yard run, William Ross kick (Drive: 10 plays, 55 yards, 2:42; Miami 20–14)

Statistics	MIA	VT
First downs	22	18
Plays–yards	74–458	63–257
Rushes–yards	28–107	30–78
Passing yards	351	179
Passing: comp–att–int	29–46–0	21–33–0
Turnovers		
Time of possession	31:12	28:48

Team	Category	Player	Statistics
Miami	Passing	Tyler Van Dyke	29/46, 351 yards, 2 TD
Miami	Rushing	Jaylan Knighton	11 carries, 30 yards
Miami	Receiving	Colbie Young	9 receptions, 110 yards, TD
Virginia Tech	Passing	Grant Wells	21/33, 179 yards, TD
Virginia Tech	Rushing	Malachi Thomas	13 carries, 41 yards
Virginia Tech	Receiving	Malachi Thomas	6 receptions, 43 yards, TD

=== Duke ===
Game Seven – Duke Blue Devils (4–3) at Miami Hurricanes (3–3)

Quarter	1	2	3	4	Total
Blue Devils	0	17	7	21	45
Hurricanes	7	0	14	0	21

at Hard Rock Stadium • Miami Gardens, Florida

- Date: Saturday, October 22, 2022
- Game time: 12:30 p.m. EST
- Game weather: Partly Cloudy • Temperature: 79 °F (26 °C)
- TV announcers (ACCRSN): Tom Werme (play-by-play), James Bates (analyst), & Wiley Ballard (sideline)

Game information

First quarter

- (10:28) MIA – Colbie Young 7-yard pass from Tyler Van Dyke, Andrés Borregales kick (Drive: 10 plays, 46 yards, 3:48; Miami 7–0)

Second quarter

- (13:45) DUKE – Riley Leonard 9-yard run, Todd Pelino kick (Drive: 5 plays, 23 yards, 1:20; Tied 7–7)
- (12:01) DUKE – Riley Leonard 5-yard run, Todd Pelino kick (Drive: 4 plays, 22 yards, 1:36; Duke 14–7)
- (6:53) DUKE – Todd Pelino 28-yard field goal (Drive: 4 plays, -1 yard, 2:05; Duke 17–7)

Third quarter

- (14:09) MIA – Colbie Young 71-yard pass from Jake Garcia, Andrés Borregales kick (Drive: 2 plays, 72 yards, 0:45; Duke 17–14)
- (13:06) MIA – Will Mallory 34-yard pass from Jake Garcia, Andrés Borregales kick (Drive: 3 plays, 39 yards, 0:56; Miami 21–17)
- (3:38) DUKE – Nicky Dalmolin 2-yard pass from Riley Leonard, Todd Pelino kick (Drive: 18 plays, 79 yards, 9:22; Duke 24–21)

Fourth quarter

- (14:06) DUKE – Riley Leonard 11-yard run, Todd Pelino kick (Drive: 5 plays, 56 yards, 1:47; Duke 31–21)
- (10:12) DUKE – Jordan Waters 2-yard run, Todd Pelino kick (Drive: 4 plays, 25 yards, 2:17; Duke 38–21)
- (5:16) DUKE – Brandon Johnson 29-yard interception return, Todd Pelino kick (Duke 45–21)

Statistics	DUKE	MIA
First downs	14	18
Plays–yards	67–336	68–327
Rushes–yards	42–200	31–48
Passing yards	136	279
Passing: comp–att–int	13–25–0	24–37–3
Turnovers		
Time of possession	32:26	27:34

Team	Category	Player	Statistics
Duke	Passing	Riley Leonard	13/25, 136 yards, TD
Duke	Rushing	Jaquez Moore	6 carries, 63 yards
Duke	Receiving	Eli Pancol	3 receptions, 39 yards
Miami	Passing	Jake Garcia	13/21, 198 yards, 2 TD, 3 INT
Miami	Rushing	Henry Parrish Jr.	11 carries, 63 yards
Miami	Receiving	Colbie Young	6 receptions, 127 yards, 2 TD

=== Virginia ===
Game Eight – Miami Hurricanes (3–4) at Virginia Cavaliers (3–4)

Quarter	1	2	3	4	OT	2OT	3OT	4OT	Total
Hurricanes	0	3	0	3	3	3	0	2	14
Cavaliers	0	0	3	3	3	3	0	0	12

at Scott Stadium • Charlottesville, Virginia

- Date: Saturday, October 29, 2022
- Game time: 12:30 p.m. EST
- Game weather: Partly Cloudy • Temperature: 56 °F (13 °C)
- TV announcers (ACCRSN): Tom Werme (play-by-play), James Bates (analyst), & Wiley Ballard (sideline)

Game information

First quarter

- No scoring plays

Second quarter

- (0:00) MIA – Andrés Borregales 38-yard field goal (Drive: 6 plays, 35 yards, 1:45; Miami 3–0)

Third quarter

- (10:42) UVA – Will Bettridge 27-yard field goal (Drive: 8 plays, 66 yards, 4:18; Tied 3–3)

Fourth quarter

- (12:11) UVA – Will Bettridge 24-yard field goal (Drive: 10 plays, 59 yards, 4:06; Virginia 6–3)
- (0:00) MIA – Andrés Borregales 20-yard field goal (Drive: 13 plays, 53 yards, 5:29; Tied 6–6)

Overtime

- (0:00) MIA – Andrés Borregales 42-yard field goal (Drive: 4 plays, 1 yard, 0:00; Miami 9–6)
- (0:00) UVA – Will Bettridge 41-yard field goal (Drive: 4 plays, 1 yard, 0:00; Tied 9–9)

Second overtime

- (0:00) UVA – Will Bettridge 41-yard field goal (Drive: 4 plays, 1 yard, 0:00; Virginia 12–9)
- (0:00) MIA – Andrés Borregales 37-yard field goal (Drive: 4 plays, 6 yards, 0:00; Tied 12–12)

Third overtime

- No scoring plays

Fourth overtime

- (0:00) MIA – Jake Garcia 3-yard two-point run (Drive: 1 play, 3 yards, 0:00; Miami 14–12)

Statistics	MIA	UVA
First downs	17	14
Plays–yards	71–273	59–327
Rushes–yards	38–147	33–119
Passing yards	125	208
Passing: comp–att–int	15–32–0	15–26–0
Turnovers		
Time of possession	32:42	27:18

Team	Category	Player	Statistics
Miami	Passing	Jake Garcia	15/29, 125 yards
Miami	Rushing	Henry Parrish Jr.	24 carries, 113 yards
Miami	Receiving	Colbie Young	5 receptions, 42 yards
Virginia	Passing	Brennan Armstrong	15/25, 208 yards
Virginia	Rushing	Brennan Armstrong	20 carries, 67 yards
Virginia	Receiving	Mike Hollins	1 reception, 64 yards

=== Florida State ===
Game Nine – Florida State Seminoles (5–3) at Miami Hurricanes (4–4)

Quarter	1	2	3	4	Total
Seminoles	14	17	0	14	45
Hurricanes	3	0	0	0	3

at Hard Rock Stadium • Miami Gardens, Florida

- Date: Saturday, November 5, 2022
- Game time: 7:30 p.m. EST
- Game weather: Clear • Temperature: 84 °F (29 °C)
- Game attendance: 66,200
- TV announcers (ABC): Joe Tessitore (play-by-play), Greg McElroy (analyst), & Katie George (sideline)

Game information

First quarter

- (13:22) FSU – Ontaria Wilson 56-yard pass from Jordan Travis, Ryan Fitzgerald kick (Drive: 3 plays, 75 yards, 1:38; Florida State 7–0)
- (9:16) MIA – Andrés Borregales 49-yard field goal (Drive: 9 plays, 45 yards, 4:06; Florida State 7–3)
- (4:51) FSU – DJ Lundy 2-yard pass from Jordan Travis, Ryan Fitzgerald kick (Drive: 9 plays, 75 yards, 4:25; Florida State 14–3)

Second quarter

- (12:11) FSU – Trey Benson 13-yard run, Ryan Fitzgerald kick (Drive: 3 plays, 39 yards, 1:23; Florida State 21–3)
- (5:13) FSU – Trey Benson 1-yard run, Ryan Fitzgerald kick (Drive: 3 plays, 7 yards, 0:55; Florida State 28–3)
- (0:00) FSU – Ryan Fitzgerald 43-yard field goal (Drive: 6 plays, 59 yards, 1:52; Florida State 31–3)

Third quarter

No scoring plays

Fourth quarter

- (14:55) FSU – Camren McDonald 8-yard pass from Jordan Travis, Ryan Fitzgerald kick (Drive: 5 plays, 61 yards, 2:18; Florida State 38–3)
- (1:36) FSU – CJ Campbell 3-yard run, Ryan Fitzgerald kick (Drive: 12 plays, 78 yards, 7:06; Florida State 45–3)

Statistics	FSU	MIA
First downs	22	13
Plays–yards	65–454	52–188
Rushes–yards	49–229	33–126
Passing yards	202	62
Passing: comp–att–int	13–16–1	10–19–2
Turnovers		
Time of possession	32:06	27:54

Team	Category	Player	Statistics
Florida State	Passing	Jordan Travis	10/12, 202 yards, 3 TD, INT
Florida State	Rushing	Trey Benson	15 carries, 128 yards, 2 TD
Florida State	Receiving	Lawrance Toafili	3 receptions, 75 yards
Miami	Passing	Jacurri Brown	5/9, 37 yards, INT
Miami	Rushing	Jaylan Knighton	4 carries, 60 yards
Miami	Receiving	Xavier Restrepo	2 receptions, 25 yards

=== Georgia Tech ===
Game Ten – Miami Hurricanes (4–5) at Georgia Tech Yellow Jackets (4–5)

Quarter	1	2	3	4	Total
Hurricanes	7	7	0	21	35
Yellow Jackets	0	7	0	7	14

at Bobby Dodd Stadium • Atlanta, Georgia

- Date: Saturday, November 12, 2022
- Game time: 3:30 p.m. EST
- Game weather: Clear • Temperature: 62 °F (17 °C)
- Game attendance: 33,857
- Referee: Mike Roche
- TV announcers (ACCRSN): Tom Werme (play-by-play), James Bates (analyst), & Wiley Ballard (sideline)

Game information

First quarter

- (8:44) MIA – Will Mallory 22-yard pass from Jacurri Brown, Andrés Borregales kick (Drive: 11 plays, 75 yards, 6:16; Miami 7–0)

Second quarter

- (9:26) MIA – Jaleel Skinner 4-yard pass from Jacurri Brown, Andrés Borregales kick (Drive: 14 plays, 93 yards, 7:31; Miami 14–0)
- (0:30) GT – Nate McCollum 9-yard pass from Zach Pyron, Gavin Stewart kick (Drive: 15 plays, 99 yards, 4:19; Miami 14–7)

Third quarter

- No scoring plays

Fourth quarter

- (7:52) MIA – Colbie Young 8-yard pass from Jacurri Brown, Andrés Borregales kick (Drive: 8 plays, 51 yards, 3:54; Miami 21–7)
- (4:29) MIA – Jaylan Knighton 2-yard run, Andrés Borregales kick (Drive: 4 plays, 34 yards, 1:44; Miami 28–7)
- (2:36) MIA – Kamren Kinchens 99-yard interception return, Andrés Borregales kick (Miami 35–7)
- (0:36) GT – Jamie Felix 7-yard pass from Zach Gibson, Gavin Stewart kick (Drive: 13 plays, 71 yards, 1:56; Miami 35–14)

Statistics	MIA	GT
First downs	21	23
Plays–yards	63–353	70–363
Rushes–yards	44–217	27–129
Passing yards	136	234
Passing: comp–att–int	14–19–0	24–43–4
Turnovers		
Time of possession	35:46	24:14

Team	Category	Player	Statistics
Miami	Passing	Jacurri Brown	14/19, 136 yards, 3 TD
Miami	Rushing	Jaylan Knighton	16 carries, 118 yards, TD
Miami	Receiving	Frank Ladson Jr.	2 receptions, 42 yards
Georgia Tech	Passing	Zach Gibson	12/21, 120 yards, TD, 2 INT
Georgia Tech	Rushing	Zach Pyron	8 carries, 66 yards
Georgia Tech	Receiving	Nate McCollum	8 receptions, 101 yards, TD

=== No. 9 Clemson ===
Game Eleven – Miami Hurricanes (5–5) at #9 Clemson Tigers (9–1)

Quarter	1	2	3	4	Total
Hurricanes	0	0	3	7	10
No. 9 Tigers	14	10	2	14	40

at Memorial Stadium • Clemson, South Carolina

- Date: Saturday, November 19, 2022
- Game time: 3:30 p.m. EST
- Game weather: Clear • Temperature: 57 °F (14 °C)
- Game attendance: 81,340
- Referee: Marcus Woods
- TV announcers (ESPN): Bob Wischusen (play-by-play), Dan Orlovsky (analyst), & Kris Budden (sideline)

Game information

First quarter

- (9:26) CLEM – Davis Allen 7-yard pass from DJ Uiagalelei, B.T. Potter kick (Drive: 12 plays, 75 yards, 5:34; Clemson 7–0)
- (4:05) CLEM – DJ Uiagalelei 8-yard run, B.T. Potter kick (Drive: 9 plays, 57 yards, 3:34; Clemson 14–0)

Second quarter

- (10:22) CLEM – Luke Price 3-yard pass from DJ Uiagalelei, B.T. Potter kick (Drive: 6 plays, 27 yards, 2:45; Clemson 21–0)
- (0:00) CLEM – B. T. Potter 32-yard field goal (Drive: 14 plays, 76 yards, 4:46; Clemson 24–0)

Third quarter

- (5:55) MIA – Andrés Borregales 44-yard field goal (Drive: 6 plays, 32 yards, 2:38; Clemson 24–3)
- (1:34) CLEM – Jacurri Brown sacked in end zone for a safety (Clemson 26–3)

Fourth quarter

- (13:45) MIA – Khalil Brantley 1-yard pass from Jake Garcia, Andrés Borregales kick (Drive: 3 plays, 10 yards, 1:03; Clemson 26–10)
- (4:40) CLEM – Will Shipley 3-yard run, B.T. Potter kick (Drive: 8 plays, 86 yards, 4:47; Clemson 33–10)
- (0:16) CLEM – Kobe Pace 1-yard run, Jonathan Weitz kick (Drive: 7 plays, 36 yards, 3:40; Clemson 40–10)

Statistics	MIA	CLEM
First downs	6	27
Plays–yards	42–98	84–447
Rushes–yards	24–30	48–207
Passing yards	68	240
Passing: comp–att–int	9–18–1	24–36–1
Turnovers		
Time of possession	21:45	38:15

Team	Category	Player	Statistics
Miami	Passing	Jacurri Brown	6/13, 53 yards, INT
Miami	Rushing	Jacurri Brown	10 carries, 22 yards
Miami	Receiving	Will Mallory	4 receptions, 42 yards
Clemson	Passing	DJ Uiagalelei	22/34, 227 yards, 2 TD, INT
Clemson	Rushing	DJ Uiagalelei	17 carries, 89 yards, TD
Clemson	Receiving	Jake Briningstool	3 receptions, 57 yards

=== Pittsburgh ===
Game Twelve – Pittsburgh Panthers (7–4) vs Miami (FL) Hurricanes (5–6) – Game summary

Quarter	1	2	3	4	Total
Panthers	14	14	7	7	42
Hurricanes	0	0	3	13	16

at Hard Rock Stadium • Miami, FL

- Date: November 26
- Game time: 8:00 p.m. EST
- Game weather: Clear • Temperature: 78 °F (26 °C) • Wind: SE at 7 miles per hour (11 km/h)
- Game attendance: 46,428
- Referee: Gary Patterson
- TV announcers (ACCN): Dave O'Brien (play-by-play), Tim Hasselbeck (analyst), & Kelsey Riggs (sideline)

Game information

First quarter

- (10:13) PIT – Israel Abanikanda 2-yard run, Ben Sauls kick (Drive: 4 plays, 30 yards, 2:06; Pittsburgh 7–0)
- (0:50) PIT – Jared Wayne 66-yard pass from Kedon Slovis, Ben Sauls kick (Drive: 2 plays, 78 yards, 0:48; Pittsburgh 14–0)

Second quarter

- (11:46) PIT – Israel Abanikanda 11-yard run, Ben Sauls kick (Drive: 2 plays, 19 yards, 0:45; Pittsburgh 21–0)
- (0:31) PIT – Jared Wayne 26-yard pass from Kedon Slovis, Ben Sauls kick (Drive: 7 plays, 89 yards, 3:27; Pittsburgh 28–0)

Third quarter

- (6:22) MIA – Andrés Borregales 25-yard field goal (Drive: 10 plays, 78 yards, 4:57; Pittsburgh 28–3)
- (0:36) PIT – Jared Wayne 7-yard pass from Kedon Slovis, Ben Sauls kick (Drive: 10 plays, 73 yards, 5:39; Pittsburgh 35–3)

Fourth quarter

- (11:52) MIA – Will Mallory 4-yard pass from Jake Garcia (Drive: 7 plays, 63 yards, 3:37; Pittsburgh 35–9)
- (9:16) PIT – C'Bo Flemister 26-yard run, Ben Sauls kick (Drive: 6 plays, 71 yards, 2:36; Pittsburgh 42–9)
- (7:22) MIA – Xavier Restrepo 4-yard pass from Jake Garcia, Andrés Borregales kick (Drive: 4 plays, 75 yards, 1:54; Pittsburgh 42–16)

Statistics	Pittsburgh	Miami
First downs	27	20
Plays–yards	63–510	66–385
Rushes–yards	35–248	27–106
Passing yards	262	279
Passing: comp–att–int	18–28–1	23–39–2
Turnovers		
Time of possession	32:18	27:42

Team	Category	Player	Statistics
Pittsburgh	Passing	Kedon Slovis	18/28, 262 yards, 3 TD, INT
Pittsburgh	Rushing	Israel Abanikanda	15 carries, 111 yards, 2 TD
Pittsburgh	Receiving	Jared Wayne	11 receptions, 205 yards, 3 TD
Miami	Passing	Jake Garcia	17/28, 192 yards, 2 TD
Miami	Rushing	Jaylan Knighton	7 carries, 72 yards
Miami	Receiving	Will Mallory	9 receptions, 103 yards, TD
