= Trooper Taylor =

American football player and coach (born 1970)

Current position
- Title: Associate head coach, running backs coach
- Team: Texas A&M
- Conference: SEC

Biographical details
- Born: February 20, 1970 (age 56); Cuero, Texas, U.S.

Playing career
- 1988–1991: Baylor
- Position: Defensive back

Coaching career (HC unless noted)
- 1992–1997: Baylor (GA/DB/WR)
- 1998: New Mexico (RB)
- 1999–2003: Tulane (WR)
- 2004–2007: Tennessee (AHC/RB/WR)
- 2008: Oklahoma State (co-OC/WR)
- 2009–2012: Auburn (AHC/WR)
- 2014–2018: Arkansas State (AHC/CB)
- 2019–2020: Duke (WR)
- 2021: Duke (AHC/CB)
- 2022–2023: Duke (AHC/RB)
- 2023: Duke (interim HC)
- 2024–present: Texas A&M (AHC/RB)

Head coaching record
- Overall: 1–0
- Bowls: 1–0

Carl "Trooper" Taylor (born February 20, 1970) is an American college football coach at Texas A&M University. He is currently serving as associate head coach and running backs coach following Mike Elko, who left Duke University to return to Texas A&M as head coach. Taylor was formerly an assistant coach at Auburn University from January 2009 until December 2012 where he served as assistant head coach and wide receivers coach under former head coach Gene Chizik. Prior to joining Auburn, Taylor served as co-offensive coordinator for Oklahoma State. He has spent over a decade coaching wide receivers, primarily in the Southeastern and Big 12 conferences.

== Personal life ==
Taylor grew up in Cuero, Texas, and was raised in a family of 16. He earned his bachelor's degree from Baylor University in 1992 and is married to Evi Crosby-Taylor, who was a track and field scholarship athlete at Baylor. The couple were wed in 1993 on the field at Baylor's Floyd Casey Stadium and have two children: a son, Blaise, and a daughter, Starr.

== Coaching career ==
Taylor played defensive back for the Baylor Bears from 1988 to 1991 and finished his playing career as the school's leader in kickoff returns and return yardage. After helping the Bears to the 1991 Copper Bowl and completing his degree, Taylor joined the coaching staff at his alma mater as a graduate assistant for two years before being named wide receivers coach in 1994. After coaching the secondary for two years, Taylor returned to coaching receivers before leaving Baylor to take the position coaching running backs at New Mexico.

In 1999, head coach Chris Scelfo lured Taylor to his staff at Tulane as the wide receivers coach. Taylor spent five years with the Green Wave before joining Phillip Fulmer's staff at Tennessee. Taylor served as running backs coach before being promoted to assistant head coach of player development in 2005, which called on him to manage the academic and social direction and development of student-athletes in conjunction with their position coaches and the coordinators. In 2006, Taylor coached the wide receivers, helping the Vols to a 12th ranked pass offense. Following the 2007 season when offensive coordinator David Cutcliffe took the head coaching position at Duke (taking the OL and RB coaches with him), Taylor was considered a candidate to take over the position full-time. Fulmer instead chose Dave Clawson and Taylor left UT to take a job as co-offensive coordinator and wide receivers coach at Oklahoma State under Mike Gundy, with whom he had previously coached at Baylor in 1996. With the help of Taylor's receivers, the 2008 Cowboys ranked 6th in the nation in offensive production.

On January 5, 2009, new head coach Gene Chizik hired Taylor to serve as assistant head coach and wide receivers coach at Auburn.

Coach Taylor has been recognized as a top-25 national recruiter on six occasions (2005 and 2007 by Rivals.com, 2009 by ESPN, 2010 by Rivals.com and 2011 by 247Sports.com, ESPN and Rivals.com and 2012 by Rivals.com). He has experience coaching in 9 bowl games including the 1994 Alamo Bowl, 2002 Hawaii Bowl, 2005 Cotton Bowl Classic, 2007 Outback Bowl, 2008 Outback Bowl, 2008 Holiday Bowl, 2010 Outback Bowl, the 2011 BCS National Championship Game, and the 2011 Chick-fil-A Bowl.

He took over as interim head coach for Duke following Elko's departure.

=== Players coached ===
Taylor has served as position coach for a number of prominent players over his career. At Tulane, he coached four wideouts into the NFL, including Roydell Williams of the Washington Redskins. He also coached the nation's top receiving trio in 2001: Adrian Burnette, Kerwin Cook, and Terrell Harris, who combined to lead the country with 2,384 receiving yards on 185 catches.

During his time in Knoxville, he coached NFL backs Cedric Houston and Gerald Riggs Jr., who became Tennessee's only pair of 1,000-yard rushers in the same season in 2004. He also coached future NFL wide receiver Robert Meachem to All-America honors in 2006. Meachem was part of a trio of Vols receivers including Jayson Swain and Bret Smith that caught a combined 159 receptions for 2,439 yards and 22 touchdowns. With all three players gone in 2007, Taylor mentored the new pass-catching trio of Lucas Taylor, Austin Rogers and Josh Briscoe to a combined 175 catches for 2,130 yards and 14 touchdowns.

In 2008, Taylor coached Oklahoma State's All-American receiver Dez Bryant into the 3rd leading receiver in the nation with catches totaling nearly 114 yards per game. Bryant was part of a potent Cowboys attack that ended ranked as the nation's 6th leading offense.

== Head coaching record ==
| Year | Team | Overall | Conference | Standing | Bowl/playoffs |
|---|---|---|---|---|---|
Duke Blue Devils (Atlantic Coast Conference) (2023)
| 2023 | Duke | 1–0 (Note: Taylor was named interim head coach for the team's bowl game following Mike Elko's departure to Texas A&M.) | 1–0 | T–6th | W Birmingham |
| Duke: | | 1–0 | 0–0 | | |
| Total: | | 1–0 | | | |
