= 2022 Virginia Cavaliers football team =

American college football season

2022 Virginia Cavaliers football
- Conference: Atlantic Coast Conference
- Coastal Division
- Record: 3–7 (1–6 ACC)
- Head coach: Tony Elliott (1st season)
- Offensive coordinator: Desmond Kitchings (1st season)
- Offensive scheme: Multiple pro-style
- Defensive coordinator: John Rudzinski (1st season)
- Base defense: Multiple 4–2–5
- Home stadium: Scott Stadium

2022 Atlantic Coast Conference football standings
	Conf.			Overall
Team	W		L	W		L
Atlantic Division
No. 13 Clemson xy$	8	–	0	11	–	3
No. 11 Florida State	5	–	3	10	–	3
Louisville	4	–	4	8	–	5
NC State	4	–	4	8	–	5
Syracuse	4	–	4	7	–	6
Wake Forest	3	–	5	8	–	5
Boston College	2	–	6	3	–	9
Coastal Division
North Carolina xy	6	–	2	9	–	5
Duke	5	–	3	9	–	4
No. 22 Pittsburgh	5	–	3	9	–	4
Georgia Tech	4	–	4	5	–	7
Miami (FL)	3	–	5	5	–	7
Virginia	1	–	6	3	–	7
Virginia Tech	1	–	6	3	–	8
Championship: Clemson 39, North Carolina 10
$ – Conference champion; x – Division champion/co-champions; y – Championship game participant; Rankings from AP Poll

The 2022 Virginia Cavaliers football team represented the University of Virginia as a member of the Coastal Division of the Atlantic Coast Conference (ACC) during the 2022 NCAA Division I FBS football season. Led by first-year head coach Tony Elliott, the Cavaliers compiled an overall record of 3–7 with a mark of 1–6 in conference play, tying for sixth place in the ACC Coast Division. Virginia played home games at Scott Stadium in Charlottesville, Virginia.

On the evening of November 13, wide receivers Lavel Davis Jr., Devin Chandler, and linebacker D'Sean Perry were killed while running back Mike Hollins was wounded in a shooting on the university's campus. The shooter was Christopher Darnell Jones Jr., a former running back for the Cavaliers in 2018. In its aftermath, the school announced it would cancel its final home game against Coastal Carolina on November 19 and its final game against Virginia Tech on November 26.

== Schedule ==
Date	Time	Opponent	Site	TV	Result	Attendance
September 3	12:30 p.m.	No. 24 (FCS) Richmond*	Scott Stadium; Charlottesville, VA	ACCRSN	W 34–17	41,122
September 10	4:00 p.m.	at Illinois*	Memorial Stadium; Champaign, IL	ESPNU	L 3–24	33,669
September 17	2:00 p.m.	Old Dominion*	Scott Stadium; Charlottesville, VA	ACCN	W 16–14	40,556
September 23	7:00 p.m.	at Syracuse	JMA Wireless Dome; Syracuse, NY	ESPN	L 20–22	34,590
October 1	7:30 p.m.	at Duke	Wallace Wade Stadium; Durham, NC	ACCRSN	L 17–38	15,152
October 8	12:00 p.m.	Louisville	Scott Stadium; Charlottesville, VA	ACCN	L 17–34	38,009
October 20	7:30 p.m.	at Georgia Tech	Bobby Dodd Stadium; Atlanta, GA	ESPN	W 16–9	29,362
October 29	12:30 p.m.	Miami (FL)	Scott Stadium; Charlottesville, VA	ACCRSN	L 12–14 ^{4OT}	43,714
November 5	12:00 p.m.	No. 17 North Carolina	Scott Stadium; Charlottesville, VA (South's Oldest Rivalry)	ACCN	L 28–31	44,156
November 12	12:00 p.m.	Pittsburgh	Scott Stadium; Charlottesville, VA	ACCN	L 7–37	36,529
November 19		Coastal Carolina*	Scott Stadium; Charlottesville, VA	ACCRSN	Canceled^{[a]}	
November 26		at Virginia Tech	Lane Stadium; Blacksburg, VA (rivalry)	ESPN+	Canceled	
*Non-conference game; Rankings from AP Poll (and CFP Rankings, after November 2) - Released prior to game; All times are in Eastern time

== Game summaries ==
=== No. 24 (FCS) Richmond ===
	1	2	3	4	Total
No. 24 (FCS) Spiders	7	3	7	0	17
Cavaliers	14	14	0	6	34

=== At Illinois ===
	1	2	3	4	Total
Cavaliers	3	0	0	0	3
Fighting Illini	17	7	3	0	27

=== Old Dominion ===
	1	2	3	4	Total
Monarchs	0	7	0	7	14
Cavaliers	7	3	0	6	16

=== At Syracuse ===
	1	2	3	4	Total
Cavaliers	0	0	13	7	20
Orange	10	6	3	3	22

=== At Duke ===
	1	2	3	4	Total
Cavaliers	0	7	3	7	17
Blue Devils	14	7	7	10	38

=== Louisville ===
	1	2	3	4	Total
Cardinals	0	13	14	7	34
Cavaliers	10	0	7	0	17

=== At Georgia Tech ===
	1	2	3	4	Total
Cavaliers	7	6	3	0	16
Yellow Jackets	6	3	0	0	9

=== Miami ===
	1	2	3	4	OT	2OT	3OT	4OT	Total
Hurricanes	0	3	0	3	3	3	0	2	14
Cavaliers	0	0	3	3	3	3	0	0	12

=== No. 17 North Carolina ===
	1	2	3	4	Total
No. 17 Tar Heels	3	7	14	7	31
Cavaliers	7	7	7	7	28

=== Pittsburgh ===
	1	2	3	4	Total
Panthers	28	0	3	6	37
Cavaliers	0	0	7	0	7

=== Coastal Carolina (Canceled) ===
	1	2	3	4	Total
Chanticleers					0
Cavaliers					0

=== At Virginia Tech (Canceled) ===
	1	2	3	4	Total
Cavaliers					0
Hokies					0

== Coaching staff ==
Name	Title
Tony Elliott	Head coach
John Rudzinski	Defensive coordinator, defensive backs
Desmond Kitchings	Offensive coordinator, tight ends
Clint Sintim	Linebackers
Taylor Lamb	Quarterbacks
Curome Cox	Defensive backs, defensive passing game coordinator
Marques Hagans	Associate head coach, wide receivers
Keith Gaither	Special teams coordinator, running Backs
Chris Slade	Defensive ends
Kevin Downing	Defensive tackles
Garrett Tujague	Offensive line, recruiting coordinator

== Notes ==
^{^[a]}The game between Coastal Carolina and Virginia was cancelled on November 16, 2022, following the 2022 University of Virginia shooting.
