= Jordan Moore (American football) =

American football player (born 2002)

No. 14 – Cincinnati Bengals
- Position: Wide receiver
- Roster status: Practice squad

Personal information
- Born: April 18, 2002 (age 24); Sykesville, Maryland, U.S.
- Listed height: 6 ft 0 in (1.83 m)
- Listed weight: 191 lb (87 kg)

Career information
- High school: Loyola Blakefield (Towson, Maryland)
- College: Duke (2021–2024)
- NFL draft: 2025: undrafted

Career history
- Cincinnati Bengals (2025–present)*
- * Offseason or practice squad member only

Awards and highlights
- Second-team All-ACC (2023); Third-team All-ACC (2024)
- Stats at Pro Football Reference

Jordan Moore (born April 18, 2002) is an American professional football wide receiver for the Cincinnati Bengals of the National Football League (NFL). He played college football for the Duke Blue Devils.

== Early life ==
Moore attended Loyola Blakefield in Towson, Maryland. Over the course of his high school career, Moore recorded 3,410 passing yards, 1,120 receiving yards, and 47 total touchdowns. A three-star recruit, he committed to play college football at Duke University over offers from UCLA, Virginia, and Wisconsin.

== College career ==
After competing for Duke's quarterback job as a freshman, Moore switched positions to wide receiver, recording 60 receptions for 656 yards and five touchdowns as a sophomore. In his sophomore season, in a game against Pittsburgh, Moore hauled in a career-high 14 receptions and 199 yards, including a touchdown. As a junior, Moore amassed 62 receptions for 835 yards and eight touchdowns while being named to the Second-team All-ACC. To begin his senior season, Moore totaled 112 receiving yards against Elon and 121 yards against Northwestern.

=== Statistics ===
College statistics
| Year | Team | GP | Receiving | | | | Rushing | | | |
| Year | Team | GP | Rec | Yds | Avg | TD | Att | Yds | Avg | TD |
|---|---|---|---|---|---|---|---|---|---|---|
| 2021 | Duke | 10 | – | – | – | – | 44 | 221 | 5.0 | 3 |
| 2022 | Duke | 13 | 60 | 656 | 10.9 | 5 | 4 | 33 | 8.3 | 0 |
| 2023 | Duke | 13 | 62 | 835 | 13.5 | 8 | 4 | 2 | 0.5 | 0 |
| 2024 | Duke | 12 | 50 | 798 | 16.0 | 7 | – | – | – | – |
| Career | | 48 | 172 | 2,289 | 13.3 | 20 | 52 | 256 | 4.9 | 3 |

== Professional career ==
Pre-draft measurables
| Height | Weight | Arm length | Hand span | Wingspan | 40-yard dash | 10-yard split | 20-yard split | 20-yard shuttle | Three-cone drill | Vertical jump | Broad jump |
|---|---|---|---|---|---|---|---|---|---|---|---|
| 6 ft 0 1/8 in (1.83 m) | 191 lb (87 kg) | 30 5/8 in (0.78 m) | 9 in (0.23 m) | 6 ft 3 5/8 in (1.92 m) | 4.55 s | 1.53 s | 2.56 s | 4.26 s | 6.91 s | 36.0 in (0.91 m) | 10 ft 3 in (3.12 m) |
All values from Pro Day

On May 9, 2025, Moore signed with the Cincinnati Bengals as an undrafted free agent after going unselected in the 2025 NFL draft. He was waived on August 26 as part of final roster cuts and re-signed to the practice squad the next day.

Moore signed a reserve/future contract with Cincinnati on January 5, 2026. On August 30, Moore was waived by the Bengals as a part of final roster cuts; he was re-signed to the team's practice squad the next day.
