= Kevin Johns =

American football player and coach (born 1975)

Current position
- Title: Quarterbacks coach
- Team: Mississippi State
- Conference: SEC

Biographical details
- Born: December 4, 1975 (age 50); Piqua, Ohio, U.S.

Playing career
- 1994–1997: Dayton
- Position: Quarterback

Coaching career (HC unless noted)
- 1998: Piqua HS (OH) (assistant)
- 1999–2001: Northwestern (GA)
- 2002–2003: Richmond (WR)
- 2004–2005: Northwestern (RB)
- 2006–2007: Northwestern (WR/RC)
- 2008–2010: Northwestern (WR/PGC)
- 2011: Indiana (co-OC/WR)
- 2012–2013: Indiana (co-OC/QB/WR)
- 2014–2016: Indiana (OC/QB/WR)
- 2017: Western Michigan (OC/QB)
- 2018: Texas Tech (OC/WR)
- 2019–2021: Memphis (OC/QB)
- 2022–2023: Duke (OC/QB)
- 2024: Oklahoma (OA)
- 2024: Oklahoma (interim co-OC/QB)
- 2025: Oklahoma State (QB)
- 2026–present: Mississippi State (QB)

Kevin Johns (born December 4, 1975) is an American football coach who is the quarterbacks coach at Mississippi State University. Previously, Johns served as an offensive coordinator at Duke University, Indiana University Bloomington, Western Michigan University, Texas Tech University, and the University of Memphis.

== Career ==
=== Early coaching career ===
Johns graduated from the University of Dayton, where he played quarterback for Flyers. He was an assistant coach for seven seasons at Northwestern under head coaches Randy Walker and Pat Fitzgerald, as well as two seasons at FCS Richmond.

=== Indiana ===
In 2011, he accepted the co-offensive coordinator position at Indiana under new head coach Kevin Wilson. From 2014 to 2016, Johns served as the offensive coordinator for the Hoosiers.

=== Western Michigan ===
In 2017, Johns joined the staff of Tim Lester as offensive coordinator and quarterbacks coach for the Western Michigan Broncos football team.

=== Texas Tech ===
In 2018, Johns joined the staff of Kliff Kingsbury as offensive coordinator and receivers coach at Texas Tech University. At the conclusion of the 2018 season Kingsbury and his coaching staff, including Johns, were fired by Texas Tech.

=== Memphis ===
In 2019, Johns became the offensive coordinator and quarterbacks coach at the University of Memphis.

=== Duke ===
On January 5, 2022, Johns joined Mike Elko's inaugural staff at Duke as the offensive coordinator and quarterbacks coach. Following the departure of Elko at the conclusion of the 2023 season, Johns was not retained by new head coach Manny Diaz.

== Personal ==
Johns received his bachelor's degree in mathematics from the University of Dayton in 1998. He then received a master's degree from Northwestern University in 2001. Johns and his wife, Krista, have three sons.
