= Tyler Santucci =

American football coach (born 1988)

Baltimore Ravens
- Title: Inside linebackers coach

Personal information
- Born: May 29, 1988 (age 38); New Kensington, Pennsylvania, U.S.
- Listed height: 5 ft 11 in (1.80 m)
- Listed weight: 232 lb (105 kg)

Career information
- Position: Linebacker
- High school: Valley (New Kensington)
- College: Stony Brook (2006–2009)

Career history
- Stony Brook (2010–2011) Graduate assistant; Stony Brook (2012) Safeties coach; Stony Brook (2013) Defensive line coach; Wake Forest (2014–2015) Graduate assistant; Texas State (2016) Linebackers coach; Notre Dame (2017) Defensive analyst; Texas A&M (2018) Defensive analyst; Wake Forest (2019) Linebackers coach; Texas A&M (2020–2021) Linebackers coach; Texas A&M (2022) Co-defensive coordinator & linebackers coach; Duke (2023) Defensive coordinator & linebackers coach; Georgia Tech (2024) Defensive coordinator & linebackers coach; Baltimore Ravens (2025) Linebackers coach; Baltimore Ravens (2026) Inside linebackers coach

Tyler Santucci (born May 29, 1988) is an American football coach and former player who is the inside linebackers coach for the Baltimore Ravens of the National Football League (NFL).

== College career ==
Pre-draft measurables
| Height | Weight | 40-yard dash | 10-yard split | 20-yard split | Vertical jump | Broad jump | Bench press |
|---|---|---|---|---|---|---|---|
| 5 ft 11 1/4 in (1.81 m) | 232 lb (105 kg) | 4.99 s | 1.70 s | 2.85 s | 33.0 in (0.84 m) | 8 ft 11 in (2.72 m) | 25 reps |
All values from Pro Day

Santucci played four years as a linebacker at Stony Brook, recording 284 tackles, 30.5 going for a loss, and five interceptions. In his career he garnered multiple honors being named to the second team All-Big South in 2008, first team All-Big South in 2009, second-team All-American by Associated Press in 2009, and he was named the Big South Defensive player of the year.

== Coaching career ==
Santucci started his coaching career at Stony Brook where he served as a graduate and linebacker assistant his first year. The next year he would become a graduate and defensive line assistant. He would then get his first job as a position coach serving as the safeties coach for Stony Brook for one year. He would then become Stony Brook's defensive line coach for the 2013 season. He would then move on to Wake Forest as a graduate assistant for the defensive line in his first year before becoming a graduate assistant for the linebackers the next year. After two years with Wake Forest Santucci would move on to Texas State, becoming their linebackers coach. After one year with Texas State, Santucci was hired by Notre Dame as a defensive analyst. Santuccis next stop would come for Texas A&M as a defensive analyst. After one year with the Aggies, Santucci returned to Wake Forest, this time as their linebackers coach. Santucci then returned to Texas A&M as their linebackers coach. After two season coaching the linebackers for the Aggies, Santucci was promoted to co-defensive coordinator. After three years with the Aggies, Santucci moved on to Duke, being hired as their defensive coordinator and linebackers coach.
