= Patrick Dougherty (American football) =

American football coach (born 1985)

Current position
- Title: Special teams coordinator
- Team: Texas A&M
- Conference: SEC

Biographical details
- Born: September 2, 1985 (age 41); Dayton, Ohio, U.S.
- Education: Ohio Dominican University; Defiance College

Playing career
- 2004–2007: Ohio Dominican
- Position: Linebacker

Coaching career (HC unless noted)
- 2008–2009: Defiance (DL)
- 2010–2011: Lindsey Wilson (STC/LB)
- 2012: Ball State (GA)
- 2013: Northwestern (DQC)
- 2014–2015: Ball State (TE)
- 2016–2019: Ball State (STC/TE)
- 2020–2021: Ball State (AHC/STC/TE)
- 2022–2023: Duke (STC/TE)
- 2024: Texas A&M (STC/TE)
- 2025–present: Texas A&M (STC)

Patrick Dougherty (born September 2, 1985) is an American football coach and former player. He is currently the special teams coordinator at Texas A&M University. He was previously the special teams coordinator and Tight Ends coach for Duke University. His previous coaching stops include Defiance College, Lindsey Wilson College, Northwestern University, and nine seasons at Ball State University.

== Playing career ==
Dougherty was a four-year letterman at linebacker, starting for two seasons, at Ohio Dominican from 2004 to 2007. He earned Academica All-Conference honors three times.

== Coaching career ==
=== Defiance College ===
Immediately following his playing career, Dougherty joined the staff at Defiance College coaching the defensive line for two seasons in 2008 and 2009. While there, he tutored four all-conference defensive linemen.

=== Lindsey Wilson ===
In 2010, Dougherty joined Chris Oliver’s staff at Lindsey Wilson. Oliver had been the offensive coordinator and offensive line coach during Dougherty’s playing days at Ohio Dominican. As the special teams coordinator and defensive line coach, Dougherty helped lead the Blue Raiders in their first two seasons playing football and coached six all-conference players, including the conference player of the year.

=== Ball State (First stint) ===
In 2012, Dougherty served as an offensive graduate assistant working with the offensive line for Pete Lembo and the Ball State Cardinals football team. He helped guide the Cardinals to a 9-4 record.

=== Northwestern ===
For the 2013 season, he served as a defensive quality control coach Pat Fitzgerald and the Northwestern Wildcats. He helped coach the linebackers.

=== Ball State (Second Stint) ===
In 2014, Dougherty earned his first full-time opportunity at the Division 1 level when he returned to Ball State as the tight ends coach and recruiting coordinator. The hired was a key piece in quieting rumors of Lembo’s departure, as he continued to fill out his staff. Following the 2015 season, Lembo resigned, and Ball State hired Mike Neu as the new head coach. Dougherty was retained by Neu, and promoted to special teams coordinator. He was promoted again, to assistant head coach, in February 2020.

Over the course of Dougherty’s time at the Muncie, Indiana University, he developed over 20 all-conference players, helped guide the Cardinals to their first Mid-American Conference title inover 20 years, achieve their first ever bowl victory, and their first ever year-ending rankings in the AP and coaches polls.

Ball State led the MAC in kickoff returns in 2017 and finished in the top three in the conference two other times, as well as 21st nationally in return efficiency in 2019. The kickoff coverage unit has consistently been at the top of the league, finishing among the top 20 in the country in 2019, while the punt return unit has finished in the top three of the MAC multiple times.

Dougherty's special teams on the 2020 championship squad ranked second in the MAC in kickoff average, featured all-conference return specialist Justin Hall and punter Nathan Snyder, and registered a blocked field goal in the MAC Championship Game and blocked punt in the Arizona Bowl.

The special teams units also contributed on the scoreboard with two touchdowns via kick returns and one coming from a blocked punt. Dougherty helped kick returner Malik Dunner earn All-MAC honors three straight years in 2017, 2018 and 2019, and guided kicker Morgan Hagee to a new Ball State PAT record in 2018 (129). Hagee finished his Ball State career ranked third in program history in points (282).

=== Duke ===
Dougherty joined Mike Elko’s inaugural Duke staff as the special teams coordinator and tight ends coach in January 2022.

=== Texas A&M ===
On December 30, 2023, it was announced that Dougherty would join Mike Elko's staff as special teams coordinator. It would be the first special teams coordinator that the Aggies would have employed since 2018, as they did not have a full-time assistant for the position for 5 seasons under former head coach Jimbo Fisher.

== Personal life ==
Dougherty and his wife, Emma, have a son named Griffin.
