= 2022 Boston College Eagles football team =

American college football season

2022 Boston College Eagles football
- Conference: Atlantic Coast Conference
- Atlantic Division
- Record: 3–9 (2–6 ACC)
- Head coach: Jeff Hafley (3rd season)
- Offensive coordinator: John McNulty (1st season)
- Offensive scheme: Pro spread
- Defensive coordinator: Tem Lukabu (3rd season)
- Base defense: 4–3
- Home stadium: Alumni Stadium

2022 Atlantic Coast Conference football standings
	Conf.			Overall
Team	W		L	W		L
Atlantic Division
No. 13 Clemson xy$	8	–	0	11	–	3
No. 11 Florida State	5	–	3	10	–	3
Louisville	4	–	4	8	–	5
NC State	4	–	4	8	–	5
Syracuse	4	–	4	7	–	6
Wake Forest	3	–	5	8	–	5
Boston College	2	–	6	3	–	9
Coastal Division
North Carolina xy	6	–	2	9	–	5
Duke	5	–	3	9	–	4
No. 22 Pittsburgh	5	–	3	9	–	4
Georgia Tech	4	–	4	5	–	7
Miami (FL)	3	–	5	5	–	7
Virginia	1	–	6	3	–	7
Virginia Tech	1	–	6	3	–	8
Championship: Clemson 39, North Carolina 10
$ – Conference champion; x – Division champion/co-champions; y – Championship game participant; Rankings from AP Poll

The 2022 Boston College Eagles football team represented Boston College as a member of the Atlantic Coast Conference (ACC) during the 2022 NCAA Division I FBS football season. Led by third-year head coach Jeff Hafley, the Eagles played their home games at Alumni Stadium in Chestnut Hill, Massachusetts.

== Offseason ==
=== Transfer portal ===
==== Outgoing transfers ====
Boston College lost 13 players to the NCAA transfer portal.

Name	Pos.	New school
Kobay White	WR	Maine
C.J. Lewis	WR	Bowling Green
Tyler Days	CB	None
Ethon Williams	WR	UConn
Jehlani Galloway	WR	Western Michigan
Stephen Ruiz	K	Indiana State
Joe Sparacio	LB	Eastern Michigan
Shawn Asbury II	S	Old Dominion
Deon Jones	S	James Madison
Aaron Boumerhi	K	None
Jahmin Muse	S	Buffalo
Hugh Davis	LB	Louisiana Tech
Jiovanny Holmes	S	None

==== Incoming transfers ====
Boston College received four players from the college football transfer portal.

Name	Pos.	Previous school
Christian Curatolo	OT	Lehigh
George Takacs	TE	Notre Dame
Dino Tomlin	WR	Maryland
Regen Terry	EDGE	Arizona

== Schedule ==
Boston College announced its 2022 football schedule on January 31, 2022. The 2022 schedule consists of six home games and six away games in the regular season. The Eagles hosted ACC foes Louisville, Clemson, Duke, and Syracuse and traveled to Virginia Tech, Florida State, Wake Forest, and NC State.

The Eagles hosted two of the four non-conference opponents, Rutgers from the Big Ten and Maine from Division I FCS, and traveled to UConn and Notre Dame with both teams being from FBS Independents.

Date	Time	Opponent	Site	TV	Result	Attendance
September 3	12:00 p.m.	Rutgers*	Alumni Stadium; Chestnut Hill, MA	ACCN	L 21–22	35,048
September 10	8:00 p.m.	at Virginia Tech	Lane Stadium; Blacksburg, VA (rivalry)	ACCN	L 10–27	65,632
September 17	7:30 p.m.	Maine*	Alumni Stadium; Chestnut Hill, MA	ACCRSN	W 38–17	34,325
September 24	8:00 p.m.	at Florida State	Doak Campbell Stadium; Tallahassee, FL	ACCN	L 14–44	79,560
October 1	12:00 p.m.	Louisville	Alumni Stadium; Chestnut Hill, MA	ACCN	W 34–33	38,517
October 8	7:30 p.m.	No. 5 Clemson	Alumni Stadium; Chestnut Hill, MA (O'Rourke–McFadden Trophy)	ABC	L 3–31	42,138
October 22	3:30 p.m.	at No. 13 Wake Forest	Truist Field at Wake Forest; Winston–Salem, NC	ACCN	L 15–43	28,530
October 29	12:00 p.m.	at UConn*	Rentschler Field; East Hartford, CT	CBSSN	L 3–13	25,527
November 4	7:00 p.m.	Duke	Alumni Stadium; Chestnut Hill, MA	ESPN2	L 31–38	34,092
November 12	3:30 p.m.	at No. 16 NC State	Carter-Finley Stadium; Raleigh, NC	ACCN	W 21–20	56,919
November 19	2:30 p.m.	at No. 18 Notre Dame*	Notre Dame Stadium; South Bend, IN (Holy War)	NBC	L 0–44	73,503
November 26	7:30 p.m.	Syracuse	Alumni Stadium; Chestnut Hill, MA	ACCRSN	L 23–32	30,113
*Non-conference game; Rankings from AP Poll released prior to the game; All times are in Eastern time

== Game summaries ==
=== Rutgers ===
	1	2	3	4	Total
Scarlet Knights	0	6	9	7	22
Eagles	7	7	7	0	21

=== At Virginia Tech ===
	1	2	3	4	Total
Eagles	0	3	7	0	10
Hokies	10	7	7	3	27

=== Maine ===
	1	2	3	4	Total
Black Bears	10	0	7	0	17
Eagles	14	14	3	7	38

=== At Florida State ===
	1	2	3	4	Total
Eagles	0	0	7	0	7
Seminoles	21	10	6	7	44

=== Louisville ===
	1	2	3	4	Total
Cardinals	7	16	10	0	33
Eagles	7	14	7	6	34

=== No. 5 Clemson ===
	1	2	3	4	Total
No. 5 Tigers	3	7	7	14	31
Eagles	0	3	0	0	3

=== At No. 13 Wake Forest ===
	1	2	3	4	Total
Eagles	3	6	6	0	15
No. 13 Demon Deacons	7	14	15	7	43

=== At UConn ===
	1	2	3	4	Total
Eagles	0	3	0	0	3
Huskies	10	0	0	3	13

=== Duke ===
	1	2	3	4	Total
Blue Devils	10	14	7	7	38
Eagles	7	7	7	10	31

=== At No. 16 NC State ===
	1	2	3	4	Total
Eagles	7	0	7	7	21
No. 16 Wolfpack	14	3	3	0	20

=== At No. 18 Notre Dame ===
	1	2	3	4	Total
Eagles	0	0	0	0	0
No. 18 Fighting Irish	17	20	7	0	44

=== Syracuse ===
	1	2	3	4	Total
Orange	0	3	3	26	32
Eagles	10	0	0	13	23

== Players drafted into the NFL ==
Round	Pick	Player	Position	NFL club
1	22	Zay Flowers	WR	Baltimore Ravens
