= Dorian Mausi =

American football player (born 2002)

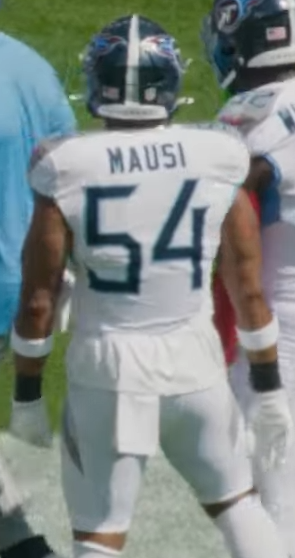
- Mausi with the Tennessee Titans in 2025

No. 54 – Tennessee Titans
- Position: Linebacker
- Roster status: Active

Personal information
- Born: March 5, 2002 (age 24); Detroit, Michigan, U.S.
- Listed height: 6 ft 1 in (1.85 m)
- Listed weight: 234 lb (106 kg)

Career information
- High school: University of Detroit Jesuit High School and Academy (Detroit)
- College: Duke (2020–2023); Auburn (2024)
- NFL draft: 2025: undrafted

Career history
- Minnesota Vikings (2025)*; Tennessee Titans (2025–present)
- * Offseason or practice squad member only

Career NFL statistics as of 2025
- Total tackles: 9
- Fumble recoveries: 1
- Stats at Pro Football Reference

Dorian Mausi (born March 5, 2002) is an American professional football linebacker for the Tennessee Titans of the National Football League (NFL). He played college football for the Duke Blue Devils and Auburn Tigers.

== Early life ==
Mausi attended University of Detroit Jesuit High School and Academy in Detroit, Michigan. He was rated as a three-star recruit and committed to play college football for the Duke Blue Devils over Michigan State, Colorado State, and Indiana.

== College career ==
=== Duke ===
As a freshman in 2020, Mausi recorded 29 tackles with two being for a loss, and a sack and half, making three starts. In 2021, he notched 59 tackles with two being for a loss, and half a sack in 11 starts. In 2022, Mausi accounted for 44 tackles. In 2023, he tallied 61 tackles and an interception. After the season, Mausi entered his name into the NCAA transfer portal.

=== Auburn ===
Mausi transferred to play for the Auburn Tigers. In week 9 of the 2024 season, he recorded ten tackles with two being for a loss, and a forced fumble versus Kentucky. Mausi finished the 2024 season with 81 tackles with nine being for a loss, two and a half sacks, and a forced fumble.

== Professional career ==
Pre-draft measurables
Height	Weight	Arm length	Hand span	Wingspan	40-yard dash	10-yard split	20-yard split	20-yard shuttle	Vertical jump	Bench press
6 ft 1 in (1.85 m)	231 lb (105 kg)	32 3/8 in (0.82 m)	9 5/8 in (0.24 m)	6 ft 7 7/8 in (2.03 m)	4.68 s	1.67 s	2.76 s	4.35 s	33.0 in (0.84 m)	18 reps
All values from Pro Day

=== Minnesota Vikings ===
After not being selected in the 2025 NFL draft, Mausi signed with the Minnesota Vikings as an undrafted free agent. He was waived on August 26 as part of final roster cuts.

=== Tennessee Titans ===
On August 27, 2025, Mausi was claimed off waivers by the Tennessee Titans.

On August 30, 2026, Mausi was placed on injured reserve with a designation to return meaning he would be have to miss at least the first four games of the 2026 season. He was activated on November 9.
