= Lyle Hemphill =

American football coach (born 1980)

Current position
- Title: Defensive coordinator
- Team: Texas A&M
- Conference: SEC

Biographical details
- Born: January 10, 1980 (age 46); Wilmington, Delaware, U.S.
- Education: Ursinus College (2001); University of Delaware (2005)

Playing career
- 1998–2002: Ursinus
- Position: Safety

Coaching career (HC unless noted)
- 2002–2003: Delaware Valley (DB/ST)
- 2004–2005: Delaware (GA/secondary)
- 2006–2009: Hofstra (ST/DB)
- 2010: Delaware (CB)
- 2011–2012: Stony Brook (S)
- 2013–2016: Stony Brook (DC/S)
- 2017–2018: Wake Forest (S)
- 2019–2021: Wake Forest (DC/S)
- 2022: Duke (S)
- 2023: Duke (co-DC/S)
- 2024: James Madison (DC/S)
- 2025: Texas A&M (sr. asst.)
- 2026–present: Texas A&M (DC)

Lyle Hemphill (born January 10, 1980) is an American college football coach. He is currently the defensive coordinator at Texas A&M University. He was previously the defensive coordinator and safeties coach for James Madison University in 2024.

== Coaching career ==
Hemphill got his first coaching job in 2002 at Delaware Valley as the defensive backs and special teams coach. in 2004, Hemphill was hired by Delaware as a graduate assistant where he worked with the secondary. In 2006, Hemphill joined Hofstra as the defensive backs and special teams coach. In 2010, Hemphill joined Delaware again this time as the team's defensive backs coach. In 2011, Hemphill was hired by Stony Brook as the team's defensive backs coach. In 2013, Hemphill was promoted by the Seawolves to be the team's defensive coordinator and safeties coach. During the 2015 season, Hemphill was named the FCS Defensive Coordinator of the year. In 2017, Hemphill would get his first FBS coaching job as he was hired to be the safeties coach for Wake Forest. In 2019, Hemphill was promoted by the Demon Deacons to be the team's defensive coordinator and safeties coach. In 2022, Hemphill was hired by Duke to coach the team's safeties. In 2023, Hemphill was promoted by the Blue Devils to serve as the co-defensive coordinator and safeties coach. In 2024, Hemphill joined the James Madison Dukes as the defensive coordinator and nickels coach. Hemphill later joined Texas A&M as a senior assistant on January 22, 2025.
