= Jess Simpson (coach) =

American football player and coach (born 1970)

Current position
- Title: Defensive line coach
- Team: Georgia Tech
- Conference: ACC

Biographical details
- Born: August 21, 1970 (age 55); Marietta, Georgia, U.S.

Playing career
- 1989–1991: Auburn
- Position(s): Tight end

Coaching career (HC unless noted)
- 1992–1993: Auburn (SA)
- 1994: Marietta HS (GA) (assistant)
- 1995–1996: Buford HS (GA) (OC)
- 1997: East Paulding HS (GA)
- 1998: Buford HS (GA) (OC)
- 1999–2004: Buford HS (GA) (DC)
- 2005–2015: Buford HS (GA)
- 2016: Georgia State (DL)
- 2017: Atlanta Falcons (DA)
- 2018: Miami (FL) (AHC/DL)
- 2019–2020: Atlanta Falcons (DL)
- 2021: Miami (FL) (AHC/DL)
- 2022: Duke (co-DC/DL)
- 2023: Duke (AHC/DL)
- 2024–present: Georgia Tech (DL)

Jess Simpson (born August 21, 1970) is an American football coach. He is the defensive line coach for Georgia Tech. He was previously the defensive line coach for the University of Miami. Prior to coaching at Miami, he spent most of his career as the head coach of Buford High School in Buford, Georgia.
