= Aaron Hall (American football) =

American football player (born 2003)

No. 94 – Carolina Panthers
- Position: Defensive tackle
- Roster status: Active

Personal information
- Born: April 18, 2003 (age 23); Durham, North Carolina, U.S.
- Listed height: 6 ft 4 in (1.93 m)
- Listed weight: 300 lb (136 kg)

Career information
- High school: Southern School of Energy and Sustainability (Durham)
- College: Duke (2021–2025)
- NFL draft: 2026: undrafted

Career history
- Carolina Panthers (2026–present)

Awards and highlights
- Third-team All-ACC (2025)
- Stats at Pro Football Reference

Aaron Hall (born April 18, 2003) is an American professional football defensive tackle for the Carolina Panthers of the National Football League (NFL). He played college football for the Duke Blue Devils.

== Early life ==
Hall attended Southern School of Energy and Sustainability in Durham, North Carolina. He committed to play college football for the Duke Blue Devils.

== College career ==
In five years at Duke from 2021 to 2025, Hall played in 53 games, totaling 122 tackles, 22.5 tackles for loss, 8 sacks, 4 pass deflections, and 1 forced fumble. He also served as a two-time team captain. After the 2025 season, he declared for the NFL draft.

== Professional career ==
Pre-draft measurables
Height	Weight	Arm length	Hand span	Wingspan	40-yard dash	10-yard split	20-yard split	20-yard shuttle	Three-cone drill	Vertical jump	Broad jump	Bench press
6 ft 4 1/8 in (1.93 m)	297 lb (135 kg)	33 in (0.84 m)	10 in (0.25 m)	6 ft 8 5/8 in (2.05 m)	5.06 s	1.66 s	2.90 s	4.37 s	7.28 s	32.0 in (0.81 m)	9 ft 7 in (2.92 m)	23 reps
All values from Pro Day

After going unselected in the 2026 NFL draft, Hall signed with the Carolina Panthers as an undrafted free agent. Following a strong camp, he entered the preseason as one of the team's top UDFA's while competing for a spot on the 53-man roster.
