= Jordan Waters =

American football player (born 2000)

No. 32 – Los Angeles Rams
- Position: Running back
- Roster status: Practice squad

Personal information
- Born: December 18, 2000 (age 25); Fairmont, North Carolina, U.S.
- Listed height: 6 ft 0 in (1.83 m)
- Listed weight: 219 lb (99 kg)

Career information
- High school: Fairmont
- College: Duke (2019–2023); NC State (2024)
- NFL draft: 2025: undrafted

Career history
- Los Angeles Rams (2025–present)*
- * Offseason or practice squad member only

Awards and highlights
- Third-team All-ACC (2023)
- Stats at Pro Football Reference

Jordan Waters (born December 18, 2000) is an American professional football running back for the Los Angeles Rams of the National Football League (NFL). He played college football for the Duke Blue Devils and NC State Wolfpack.

== Early life ==
Waters attended Fairmont High School located in Fairmont, North Carolina. Coming out of high school, he committed to play college football for the Duke Blue Devils over offers from other schools such as East Carolina and Wake Forest.

== College career ==
=== Duke ===
During his first collegiate season in 2019, Waters used the season to redshirt. In week ten of the 2020 season, he notched 78 yards and his first career rushing touchdown in a win over Charlotte. In the 2020 season, he rushed for 100 yards and two touchdowns on 16 carries. During the 2021 season, Waters logged 39 carries for 197 yards and a touchdown, while also hauling in six receptions for 76 yards and a touchdown. In the 2022 season, he ran for 566 yards and eight touchdowns on 123 carries. During the 2023 season, Waters rushed 153 times for 819 yards and 12 touchdowns, while also hauling in nine passes for 139 yards. After the conclusion of the 2023 season, he decided to enter his name into the NCAA transfer portal.

=== NC State ===
Waters transferred to play for the NC State Wolfpack. In week one of the 2024 season, he rushed for 123 yards and two touchdowns, while also hauling in a reception for ten yards in a victory versus Western Carolina. In week ten, he rushed for 115 yards and two touchdowns on just five carries in a victory over Stanford. Waters finished the 2024 season, rushing for 470 yards and four touchdowns on 95 carries.

== Professional career ==
Pre-draft measurables
Height	Weight	Arm length	Hand span	Wingspan	40-yard dash	10-yard split	20-yard split	20-yard shuttle	Three-cone drill	Vertical jump	Broad jump	Bench press
6 ft 0 in (1.83 m)	221 lb (100 kg)	32 5/8 in (0.83 m)	9 5/8 in (0.24 m)	6 ft 5 in (1.96 m)	4.57 s	1.48 s	2.62 s	4.33 s	7.06 s	33.5 in (0.85 m)	10 ft 0 in (3.05 m)	17 reps
All values from Pro Day

=== Los Angeles Rams ===
After not being selected in the 2025 NFL draft, Waters signed with the Los Angeles Rams as an undrafted free agent. He was waived on August 26 as part of final roster cuts.

On January 14, 2026, Waters was selected by the St. Louis Battlehawks of the United Football League (UFL). However, on February 5, he signed a reserve/futures contract with the Rams. On August 30, Waters was waived by Los Angeles as a part of final roster cuts, but subsequently re-signed to the team's practice squad the following day.
