= Eli Pancol =

American football player (born 2000)

Profile
- Position: Wide receiver

Personal information
- Born: July 7, 2000 (age 26); Pendleton, Indiana, U.S.
- Listed height: 6 ft 3 in (1.91 m)
- Listed weight: 205 lb (93 kg)

Career information
- High school: Pendleton Heights (IN)
- College: Duke (2019–2024)
- NFL draft: 2025: undrafted

Career history
- Jacksonville Jaguars (2025)*; Indianapolis Colts (2025–2026)*; Denver Broncos (2026)*
- * Offseason or practice squad member only

Awards and highlights
- Brian Piccolo Award (2024); Third-team All-ACC (2024)
- Stats at Pro Football Reference

Eli Pancol (born July 7, 2000) is an American professional football wide receiver. He played college football for the Duke Blue Devils and was signed by the Jacksonville Jaguars as an undrafted free agent in 2025.

== Early life ==
Pancol attended Pendleton Heights High School in Pendleton, Indiana. He was rated as a four-star recruit and committed to play college football for the Duke Blue Devils.

== College career ==
In his first three seasons from 2019 through 2021, Pancol totaled 47 receptions for 565 yards and five touchdowns in 35 games. In 2022, he recorded 23 receptions for 347 yards. Pancol missed the 2023 season due to an ankle injury. In the 2024 season opener, he recorded seven catches for 81 yards and a touchdown in a win over Elon. In week 13, Pancol tallied five receptions for 188 yards and three touchdowns in a win over Virginia Tech on Senior Night. During the 2024 season, he recorded 60 passes for 798 yards and nine touchdowns; after the season he declared for the 2025 NFL draft. For his performance during the 2024 season, and for overcoming injuries throughout his career, Pancol was named 2024 Piccolo Award winner.

== Professional career ==
Pre-draft measurables
Height	Weight	Arm length	Hand span	Wingspan	40-yard dash	10-yard split	20-yard split	20-yard shuttle	Three-cone drill	Vertical jump	Broad jump	Bench press
6 ft 1 3/8 in (1.86 m)	205 lb (93 kg)	30 in (0.76 m)	9 in (0.23 m)	6 ft 2 3/4 in (1.90 m)	4.40 s	1.49 s	2.50 s	4.26 s	6.94 s	36.0 in (0.91 m)	10 ft 3 in (3.12 m)	23 reps
All values from Pro Day

=== Jacksonville Jaguars ===
After not being selected in the 2025 NFL draft, Pancol signed with the Jacksonville Jaguars as an undrafted free agent. He was waived on August 26 with an injury designation as part of final roster cuts.

=== Indianapolis Colts ===
On November 18, 2025, Pancol signed with the Indianapolis Colts' practice squad. He signed a reserve/future contract with Indianapolis on January 5, 2026.

On August 30, 2026, Pancol was waived by the Colts as a part of final roster cuts. He was re-signed to the team's practice squad on September 23. He was released from the practice squad on October 20.

=== Denver Broncos ===
On October 27, 2026, Pancol was signed to the Denver Broncos' practice squad. On November 3, he was released.
