= Mike Elko =

American football player and coach (born 1977)

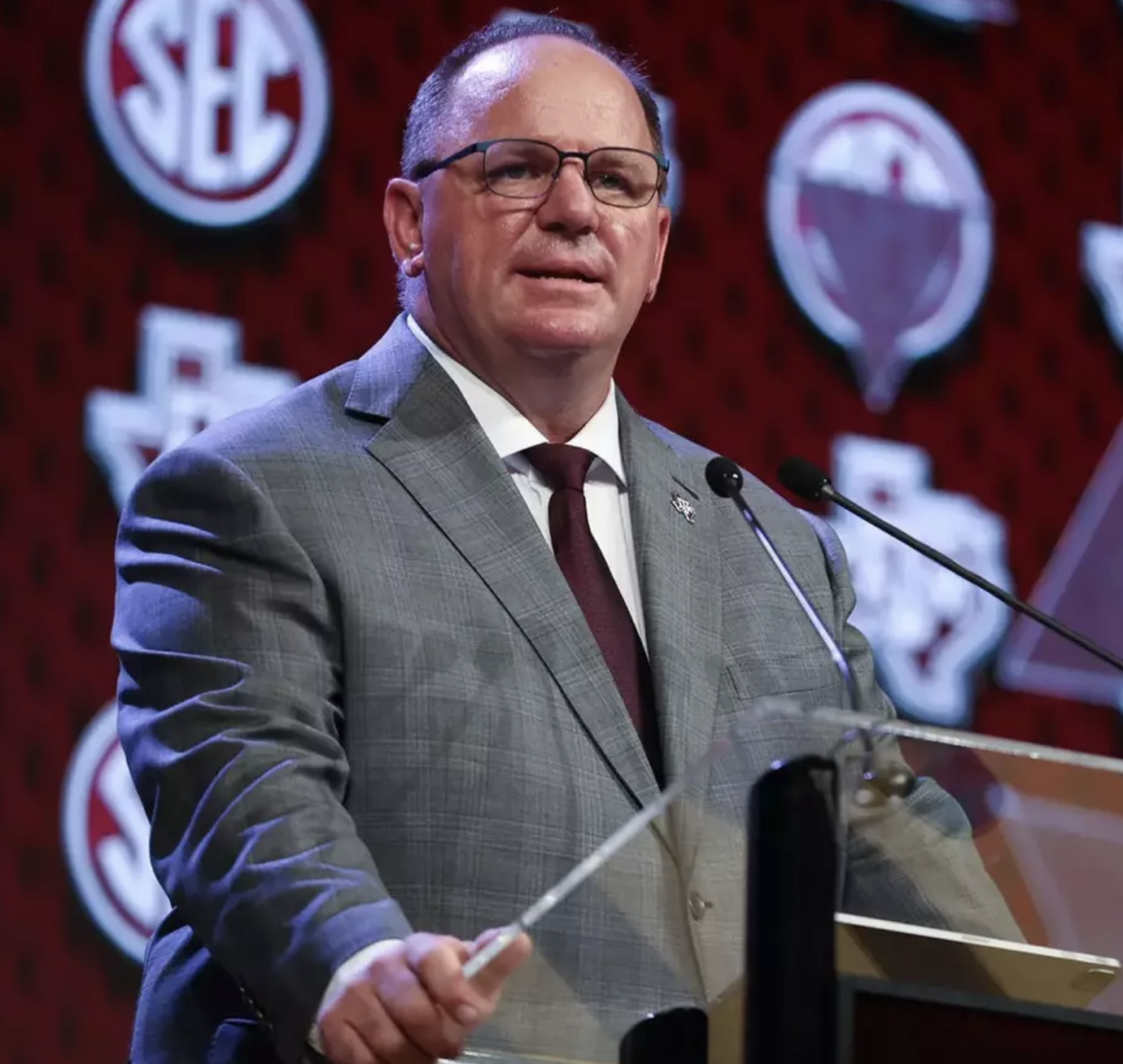
- Elko in 2024

Current position
- Title: Head coach
- Team: Texas A&M
- Conference: SEC
- Record: 23–14
- Annual salary: $11.5 million

Biographical details
- Born: July 28, 1977 (age 49); South Brunswick, New Jersey, U.S.

Playing career
- 1995–1998: Penn
- Position: Safety

Coaching career (HC unless noted)
- 1999: Stony Brook (GA)
- 2000: Penn (DB)
- 2001: Merchant Marine (DC/DB)
- 2002–2003: Fordham (co-DC/LB)
- 2004–2005: Richmond (ST/LB)
- 2006: Hofstra (DC/DB)
- 2007: Hofstra (DC/LB)
- 2008: Hofstra (AHC/DC/LB)
- 2009–2013: Bowling Green (DC/LB)
- 2014–2016: Wake Forest (DC/S)
- 2017: Notre Dame (DC)
- 2018–2021: Texas A&M (DC/S)
- 2022–2023: Duke
- 2024–present: Texas A&M

Head coaching record
- Overall: 39–23
- Bowls: 1–2
- Tournaments: 0–1 (CFP)

Accomplishments and honors

Awards
- ACC Coach of the Year (2022)

Michael Elko (born July 28, 1977) is an American college football coach who is the head football coach at Texas A&M University, a position he has held since 2024. He was previously the head coach at Duke for the 2022 and 2023 seasons and the defensive coordinator at Texas A&M from 2018 to 2021.

== Early life ==
Raised in South Brunswick, New Jersey, Elko graduated in 1995 from South Brunswick High School, where he played baseball, basketball and was the quarterback for the school's football team. He was recognized by the coaches of the Greater Middlesex Conference as the league's top quarterback in 1994 and was inducted into the school's athletic hall of fame in 2012. He graduated from the University of Pennsylvania, where he played for the Penn Quakers football team that won the Ivy league championship in 1998.

== Coaching career ==
=== Early career ===
Elko coached under Dave Clawson for 12 seasons. He spent two seasons with Clawson at both Fordham and Richmond, five seasons with him at Bowling Green, and three seasons with Clawson at Wake Forest. During the 2016 season, Elko's Wake Forest defense ranked in the top 20 for NCAA Division I Football Bowl Subdivision (FBS) in defensive touchdowns scored, turnovers, red zone defense, sacks, and scoring defense.

=== Notre Dame ===
On December 20, 2016, Elko was announced as the new defensive coordinator at Notre Dame Fighting Irish football The Fighting Irish fired DC Brian VanGorder the prior September after Notre Dame started the season with a 1–3 record and a defense ranked third from the bottom of the FBS. Elko was credited with significantly improving the team's defense, ranking 31st in scoring defense, 39th in pass efficiency defense, and 43rd in turnovers gained.

=== Texas A&M (defensive coordinator) ===
On January 4, 2018, Elko was hired by Jimbo Fisher as the defensive coordinator at Texas A&M inking a three-year deal averaging $1.8M/year.

=== Duke ===
On December 13, 2021, Elko was announced as head coach at Duke. In his first season, the Blue Devils went 9–4 with a win in the Military Bowl. In 2023, Duke began the season with an upset 28–7 win over Clemson, and finished the regular season 7–5.

=== Texas A&M (head coach) ===
==== 2024 season ====
On November 27, 2023, Elko was named head coach at Texas A&M University. In his first season, Elko led the Aggies to a 5–0 starting conference record—the Aggies' best start in SEC conference play. Elko also oversaw the revival of the Lone Star Showdown at Kyle Field, which was the first time the Texas–Texas A&M football rivalry had been played in 13 years. The Aggies went 1–4 in their final five games and finished the season 8–5, including a 43–41 four-overtime loss to Auburn and a loss in the Las Vegas Bowl.

==== 2025 season ====
Elko led the Aggies to an 11–0 start in the 2025 season, their first time doing such since 1992. Additionally, the Aggies were ranked as high as third in the Associated Press top 25 poll, which was their highest ranking in 30 years. On November 15, Elko and the university reached an agreement to a new six-year contract that would extend him through the 2031 season. Later that day, the Aggies pulled off the largest comeback in school history against the South Carolina Gamecocks, scoring 28 unanswered points in the second half and winning 31–30. SEC teams had lost 366 straight games since 1992 when trailing by 27 or more points. The Aggies' 11 game win-streak was snapped after a 27–17 loss to the Aggies' archrival, the Texas Longhorns in the Lone Star Showdown, knocking the Aggies out of contention for the SEC Championship Game. Elko led the Aggies to the program's first College Football Playoff appearance when they were seeded No. 7 in the 2025 College Football Playoff after finishing the regular season with an 11–1 record. The Aggies hosted the No. 10 Miami Hurricanes at Kyle Field in the first round and lost 3–10, ending the season with an 11–2 record.

== Head coaching record ==
Year	Team	Overall	Conference	Standing	Bowl/playoffs	Coaches^{#}	AP^{°}
Duke Blue Devils (Atlantic Coast Conference) (2022–2023)
2022	Duke	9–4	5–3	T–2nd (Coastal)	W Military		
2023	Duke	7–5	4–4	T–6th	Birmingham (Note: Did not coach bowl game)		
Duke:		16–9	9–7				
Texas A&M Aggies (Southeastern Conference) (2024–present)
2024	Texas A&M	8–5	5–3	T–4th	L Las Vegas		
2025	Texas A&M	11–2	7–1	T–1st	L CFP First Round^{†}	8	8
2026	Texas A&M	4–7	1–7				
Texas A&M:		23–14	13–11				
Total:		39–23					
