= 2023 North Carolina Tar Heels football team =

American college football season

2023 North Carolina Tar Heels football

Duke's Mayo Bowl, L 10–30 vs. West Virginia
- Conference: Atlantic Coast Conference
- Record: 8–5 (4–4 ACC)
- Head coach: Mack Brown (15th season)
- Offensive coordinator: Chip Lindsey (1st season)
- Offensive scheme: Up-tempo spread
- Defensive coordinator: Gene Chizik (4th season)
- Co-defensive coordinators: Charlton Warren (2nd season); Tommy Thigpen (5th season)
- Base defense: 4–2–5 or 4–3
- Home stadium: Kenan Stadium

2023 Atlantic Coast Conference football standings
	Conf.			Overall
Team	W		L	W		L
No. 6 Florida State y$	8	–	0	13	–	1
No. 19 Louisville y	7	–	1	10	–	4
No. 21 NC State	6	–	2	9	–	4
Georgia Tech	5	–	3	7	–	6
Virginia Tech	5	–	3	7	–	6
No. 20 Clemson	4	–	4	9	–	4
Duke	4	–	4	8	–	5
North Carolina	4	–	4	8	–	5
Boston College	3	–	5	7	–	6
Miami (FL)	3	–	5	7	–	6
Syracuse	2	–	6	6	–	7
Pittsburgh	2	–	6	3	–	9
Virginia	2	–	6	3	–	9
Wake Forest	1	–	7	4	–	8
Championship: Florida State 16, Louisville 6
$ – Conference champion; y – Championship game participant; Rankings from AP Poll

The 2023 North Carolina Tar Heels football team represented the University of North Carolina at Chapel Hill as a member of the Atlantic Coast Conference (ACC) in the 2023 NCAA Division I FBS football season. The Tar Heels were led by head coach Mack Brown, who was in the fifth season of his second stint at North Carolina and 15th overall season at the university. The team played their home games at Kenan Stadium. The North Carolina Tar Heels football team drew an average home attendance of 50,095 in 2023.

== Off-season ==
=== Coaching changes ===
After the ACC Championship Game, offensive coordinator/quarterbacks coach Phil Longo accepted the same position at Wisconsin. Offensive line coach Jack Bicknell Jr. followed Longo to Madison after one year in Chapel Hill.

On December 14, 2022, the Tar Heels hired Randy Clements as the new offensive line coach, and would also hire Chip Lindsey to fill the offensive coordinator/quarterbacks coach vacancy. Along with the new hires, AHC/WR coach Lonnie Galloway added the title of pass game coordinator, and then-TE coach John Lilly added the title of run game coordinator.

Cornerbacks coach and Tar Heel football legend Dré Bly would leave the program in January, and would be replaced in the position by Indiana safeties coach Jason Jones.

In February, John Lilly left to take the TE coach position on Frank Reich's Carolina Panthers staff. He was replaced four days later by former Cleveland Browns head coach Freddie Kitchens. Kitchens was introduced officially on March 1, in the team's pre-spring practice press conference. Kitchens retains Lilly's former title of run game coordinator as well.

Former Tar Heel letterman and longtime NFL assistant Clyde Christensen joined the staff as a volunteer offensive analyst as well, after several seasons as the quarterbacks coach for the Tampa Bay Buccaneers.

The defensive staff was fortified also, as former NFL assistant coach Ted Monachino was hired as a defensive analyst.

=== Departures ===
==== NFL draft ====
The following Tar Heels were selected in the 2023 NFL draft.

Round	Pick	Player	Position	NFL team
3	79	Josh Downs	WR	Indianapolis Colts
5	169	Asim Richards	OL	Dallas Cowboys
7	219	Antoine Green	WR	Detroit Lions
7	227	Raymond Vohasek	DL	Jacksonville Jaguars

==== Transfers ====
Per NCAA guidance, players can enter the transfer portal in one of two windows. The first, a 45-day period following the conclusion of the sport's regular season, opened for football in December 2022 and closed in January 2023. A second, shorter transfer period opened on April 15, following the conclusion of spring practice.

Name	No.	Pos.	Height	Weight	Hometown	Year	New school
Dontae Balfour	14	DB	6'1"	180	Starke, FL	(redshirt) Freshman	Charlotte
Tymir Brown	28	DB	6'0"	180	Jacksonville, NC	(redshirt) Freshman	ECU
Chris Collins	17	DL	6'4"	245	Richmond, VA	Graduate	Minnesota
Ja'Qurious Conley‡	0	DB	6'1"	215	Jacksonville, NC	Junior	«»
Jacolby Criswell	6	QB	6'1"	225	Morrilton, AR	Sophomore	Arkansas
Raneiria "RaRa" Dillworth	11	LB	6'1"	200	Winston-Salem, NC	Sophomore	ECU
Storm Duck	3	DB	6'0"	200	Boiling Springs, SC	Senior	Louisville
Tony Grimes	1	DB	6'0"	195	Virginia Beach, VA	Junior	Texas A&M
Ladaeson Deandre Hollins‡	15	DB	6'1"	200	Tampa, FL	Graduate	Charlotte
Bryson Jennings‡	19	DL	6'4"	245	Richmond, VA	(redshirt) Freshman	Liberty
Kendall Karr	82	TE	6'3"	250	Belmont, NC	Sophomore	Coastal Carolina
Cam'Ron Kelly	9	DB	6'1"	210	Chesapeake, VA	Senior	Louisville
Jonathan Kim	95	PK	6'0"	210	Fredericksburg, VA	Senior	Michigan State
Dontavius Nash	21	DB	6'2"	180	Gastonia, NC	(redshirt) Freshman	ECU
Justin Olson	83	WR	6'2"	200	Huntersville, NC	Junior	MTSU
Keeshawn Silver	55	DL	6'5"	315	Rocky Mount, NC	(redshirt) Freshman	Kentucky
Gabe Stephens‡	34	DL	6'3"	220	Mount Holly, NC	(redshirt) Sophomore	Eastern Kentucky
Jahlil Taylor	52	DL	6'0"	295	Vienna, GA	Senior	ODU

‡ Entered transfer portal following the conclusion of spring practices.

«» Indicates player did not enroll at a new school.

=== Additions ===
==== Incoming transfers ====
Name	No.	Pos.	Height	Weight	Hometown	Year	Previous school
Derrik Allen	7	DB	6'2"	211	Marietta, GA	Graduate	Georgia Tech
Armani Chatman	9	DB	6'0"	180	Virginia Beach, VA	Graduate	Virginia Tech
Ryan Coe	40	K	6'3"	225	McDonald, PA	Graduate	Cincinnati
Amari Gainer	3	Jack	6'3"	237	Tallahassee, FL	Graduate	Florida State
Alijah Huzzie	28	DB	5'11"	190	Franklin, GA	Junior	ETSU
Willie Lampkin	53	OL	6'0"	275	Lakeland, FL	Senior	Coastal Carolina
Antavious "Stick" Lane	1	DB	5'9"	180	West Palm Beach, FL	Graduate	Georgia State
Tom Maginness	96	P	6'0"	220	Melbourne, Australia	Sophomore	ProKick Australia
Nate McCollum	6	WR	5'11"	185	Hampton, GA	Senior	Georgia Tech
Devontez Walker	9	WR	6'3"	190	Charlotte, NC	Junior	Kent State

==== Recruiting class ====
North Carolina signed 20 players in the class of 2023. The Tar Heels' class finished 30th in the 247Sports composite rankings, 28th in the Rivals rankings, and 29th in the ESPN.com rankings. Four signees were ranked in the ESPN 300 prospect list.

College recruiting
Name	Hometown	School	Height	Weight	Commit date
Tad Hudson; QB	Cornelius, NC	Hough	6 ft 3 in (1.91 m)	225 lb (102 kg)	Aug 1, 2021
Tad Hudson; QB	Recruit ratings: Rivals: 247Sports: ESPN: (83)				
Jaybron Harvey; EDGE	Durham, NC	Southern Durham	6 ft 4 in (1.93 m)	215 lb (98 kg)	Jul 1, 2022
Jaybron Harvey; EDGE	Recruit ratings: Rivals: 247Sports: ESPN: (82)				
Joel Starlings; DL	Richmond, VA	Benedictine	6 ft 4 in (1.93 m)	310 lb (140 kg)	May 23, 2022
Joel Starlings; DL	Recruit ratings: Rivals: 247Sports: ESPN: (82)				
Chris Culliver; WR	Maiden, NC	Maiden	6 ft 3 in (1.91 m)	190 lb (86 kg)	Jul 4, 2022
Chris Culliver; WR	Recruit ratings: Rivals: 247Sports: ESPN: (81)				
Christian Hamilton; WR	Harrisburg, NC	Hickory Ridge	5 ft 11 in (1.80 m)	175 lb (79 kg)	Jul 1, 2022
Christian Hamilton; WR	Recruit ratings: Rivals: 247Sports: ESPN: (80)				
Nolan McConnell; OL	Stafford, VA	Colonial Forge	6 ft 6 in (1.98 m)	260 lb (120 kg)	May 3, 2022
Nolan McConnell; OL	Recruit ratings: Rivals: 247Sports: ESPN: (79)				
Tyler Thompson; EDGE	Cary, NC	Panther Creek	6 ft 4 in (1.93 m)	205 lb (93 kg)	Jun 29, 2022
Tyler Thompson; EDGE	Recruit ratings: Rivals: 247Sports: ESPN: (79)				
Caleb LaVallee; LB	Mableton, GA	Whitefield Academy	6 ft 1 in (1.85 m)	215 lb (98 kg)	Jun 6, 2022
Caleb LaVallee; LB	Recruit ratings: Rivals: 247Sports: ESPN: (78)				
Tre Miller; DB	Edmond, OK	Deer Creek	5 ft 10 in (1.78 m)	170 lb (77 kg)	Jun 26, 2022
Tre Miller; DB	Recruit ratings: Rivals: 247Sports: ESPN: (78)				
Rodney Lora; DL	Woodberry Forest, VA	Woodberry Forest	6 ft 3 in (1.91 m)	275 lb (125 kg)	Dec 20, 2022
Rodney Lora; DL	Recruit ratings: Rivals: 247Sports: ESPN: (78)				
D.J. Geth; OL	Roebuck, SC	Dorman	6 ft 4 in (1.93 m)	300 lb (140 kg)	Jun 25, 2021
D.J. Geth; OL	Recruit ratings: Rivals: 247Sports: ESPN: (77)				
Paul Billups; WR	Chesapeake, VA	Western Branch	6 ft 2 in (1.88 m)	190 lb (86 kg)	Aug 24, 2022
Paul Billups; WR	Recruit ratings: Rivals: 247Sports: ESPN: (77)				
Jordan Louie; RB	Norcross, GA	Meadowcreek	6 ft 0 in (1.83 m)	200 lb (91 kg)	Dec 21, 2022
Jordan Louie; RB	Recruit ratings: Rivals: 247Sports: ESPN: (77)				
Amare Campbell; LB	Manassas, VA	Unity Reed	6 ft 0 in (1.83 m)	230 lb (100 kg)	Aug 24, 2022
Amare Campbell; LB	Recruit ratings: Rivals: 247Sports: ESPN: (76)				
Julien Randolph; TE	Ashburn, VA	Independence	6 ft 4 in (1.93 m)	215 lb (98 kg)	Jun 14, 2022
Julien Randolph; TE	Recruit ratings: Rivals: 247Sports: ESPN: (76)				
Kaleb Cost; DB	Tyrone, GA	Sandy Creek	5 ft 10 in (1.78 m)	180 lb (82 kg)	Jun 11, 2022
Kaleb Cost; DB	Recruit ratings: Rivals: 247Sports: ESPN: (76)				
Ayden Duncanson; DB	Mableton, GA	Whitefield Academy	6 ft 1 in (1.85 m)	185 lb (84 kg)	Oct 16, 2022
Ayden Duncanson; DB	Recruit ratings: Rivals: 247Sports: ESPN: (76)				
R.J. Grigsby; OL	Kennesaw, GA	North Cobb	6 ft 5 in (1.96 m)	295 lb (134 kg)	Jul 1, 2022
R.J. Grigsby; OL	Recruit ratings: Rivals: 247Sports: ESPN: (76)				
Ty Adams; DB	Swainsboro, GA	Swainsboro	5 ft 11 in (1.80 m)	175 lb (79 kg)	Sep 25, 2022
Ty Adams; DB	Recruit ratings: Rivals: 247Sports: ESPN: (76)				
Michael Short; LB	Charlotte, NC	Mallard Creek	6 ft 2 in (1.88 m)	220 lb (100 kg)	Dec 15, 2022
Michael Short; LB	Recruit ratings: Rivals: 247Sports: ESPN: (74)				
Overall recruit ranking: Rivals: #28 247Sports: #30 ESPN: #29
Note: In many cases, Scout, Rivals, 247Sports, On3, and ESPN may conflict in their listings of height and weight.; In these cases, the average was taken. ESPN grades are on a 100-point scale.; Sources: "Rivals commits". Rivals.; "ESPN commits". ESPN.; "2023 Team Ranking". Rivals.com.; "247Sports commits". 247Sports.

== Personnel ==
=== Coaching staff ===
North Carolina Tar Heels coaches
Mack Brown	Head coach	15th
Chip Lindsey	Offensive coordinator/quarterbacks coach	1st
Freddie Kitchens	Run game coordinator/Tight ends coach	1st
Randy Clements	Offensive line coach	1st
Lonnie Galloway	Assistant head coach/Pass Game coordinator/Wide receivers	5th
Larry Porter	Special Teams coordinator/Running backs	3rd
Gene Chizik	AHC/Defensive coordinator	4th
Charlton Warren	Co-defensive coordinator/Defensive backs coach	2nd
Tommy Thigpen	Co-defensive coordinator/Inside Linebackers coach	6th
Tim Cross	Defensive line coach	5th
Jason Jones	Cornerbacks coach	1st
Brian Hess	Head strength and conditioning coach	5th
Sparky Woods	Senior advisor to head coach	5th
Darrell Moody	Senior advisor to head coach	5th
Clyde Christensen	Volunteer Offensive Analyst	1st
Natrone Means	Offensive Analyst	3rd
Ted Monachino	Senior Defensive Analyst	1st

=== Roster ===
2023 North Carolina Tar Heels Football Roster
Quarterback: 10 Drake Maye – sophomore (6'4, 225); 12 Tad Hudson – freshman (6'2, 220); 14 Jefferson Boaz – junior (6'7, 235); 15 Conner Harrell – (redshirt) freshman (6'0, 200); 16 Russell Tabor – sophomore (6'2, 215); Running back: 4 Caleb Hood – junior (5'11, 225); 21 Elijah Green – junior (5'11, 210); 23 George Pettaway – sophomore (5'0, 195); 24 British Brooks – graduate (5'11, 225); 25 Kellan Hood – (redshirt) freshman (5'10, 190); 28 Omarion Hampton – sophomore (6'0, 220); 34 Jordan Louie – freshman (5'10, 215); Wide receiver: 0 Tychaun "Doc" Chapman – (redshirt) freshman (5'9, 175); 1 Andre Greene Jr. – (redshirt) freshman (6'2, 200); 2 Gavin Blackwell – sophomore (5'11, 180); 3 Chris Culliver – freshman (6'1, 185); 5 J.J. Jones – junior (6'2, 210); 6 Nate McCollum – junior (5'8, 185); 7 Christian Hamilton – freshman (5'11, 180); 8 Kobe Paysour – sophomore (6'0, 185); 9 Devontez "Tez" Walker – junior (6'2, 195); 11 Paul Billups II – freshman (6'1, 195); 13 Tylee Craft – senior (6'5, 200); 19 Grady Sherrill – (redshirt) freshman (5'8, 180); 20 Brooks Miller – sophomore (5'11, 180); 27 Michael Hall – (redshirt) freshman (6'0, 180); 38 Aiden Cloninger – (redshirt) freshman (5'11, 190); 83 Josh Espindola – freshman (5'10, 170); 84 Cyrus Rogers – sophomore (5'11, 185); 85 Landon Stevens – junior (6'2, 200); 86 Thomas Flynn – sophomore (6'3, 205); Placekicker: 37 Liam Boyd – (redshirt) freshman (6'0, 200); 40 Ryan Coe – graduate (6'2, 220); 90 Todd Pledger – sophomore (6'8, 210); 98 Noah Burnette – junior (5'10, 175); Punter: 91 Ben Kiernan – graduate (6'0, 210); 92 Cole Maynard — sophomore (6'2, 172); 96 Tom Maginness – sophomore (6'0, 205)	Tight end: 18 Bryson Nesbit – junior (6'5, 235); 80 Julien Randolph – freshman (6'5, 220); 81 John Copenhaver – junior (6'3, 240); 82 Deems May – (redshirt) freshman (6'1, 230); 87 Cort Halsey – freshman (6'2, 215); 88 Kamari Morales – graduate (6'2, 245); 89 Cal Tierney – (redshirt) freshman (6'5, 235); Offensive line: 51 R.J. Grigsby – freshman (6'3, 315); 52 Jonathan Adorno – senior (6'4, 315); 53 Willie Lampkin – junior (5'11, 290); 54 Chance Carroll – junior (6'2, 295); 55 Zach Rice – (redshirt) freshman (6'4, 315); 60 Carter Kulka – sophomore (6'3, 270); 61 Diego Pounds – sophomore (6'5, 330); 63 Ed Montilus – graduate (6'3, 315); 64 Malik McGowan – junior (6'3, 320); 65 Corey Gaynor – graduate (6'3, 305); 68 D.J. Geth – freshman (6'3, 305); 69 Jarvis Hicks – (redshirt) freshman (6'6, 295)'; 72 Nolan McConnell – freshman (6'6, 320); 73 Eli Sutton – sophomore (6'6, 310); 74 Justin Kanyuk – (redshirt) freshman (6'5, 315); 75 Spencer Rolland – graduate (6'6, 315); 76 William Barnes – senior (6'4, 320); 78 Trevyon Green – (redshirt) freshman (6'7, 340); 79 Bo Burkes – (redshirt) freshman (6'2, 300); Defensive line: 0 Tomari Fox – graduate (6'3, 300); 4 Travis Shaw – sophomore (6'5, 335); 5 Jahvaree Ritzie – junior (6'4, 295); 8 Myles Murphy – senior (6'4, 310); 10 Desmond Evans – senior (6'6, 275); 12 Beau Atkinson – (redshirt) freshman (6'5, 270); 41 Kedrick Bingley-Jones – junior (6'4, 305); 92 Rodney Lora – freshman (6'3, 275); 93 Jacolbe Cowan – junior (6'4, 280); 94 Joel Starlings – freshman (6'3, 280); 96 Damon Bremer – freshman (6'2, 255); 98 Kevin Hester Jr. – senior (6'3, 315)	Jack: 3 Amari Gainer – graduate (6'3, 235); 14 Jaybron Harvey – freshman (6'3, 240); 24 Malaki Hamrick – sophomore (6'2, 220); 25 Kaimon Rucker – senior (6'1, 265); 40 Tyler Thompson – freshman (6'5, 220); 87 Colby Doreen – junior (6'4, 225); Linebacker: 17 Amare Campbell – freshman (6'0, 230); 23 Power Echols – junior (6'0, 225); 30 Michael Short – freshman (6'3, 225); 32 Sebastian Cheeks – (redshirt) freshman (6'3, 220); 33 Cedric Gray – senior (6'2, 230); 34 Caleb LaVallee – freshman (6'0, 225); 36 Jalen Brooks – junior (5'10, 240); 44 Randy "Deuce" Caldwell – sophomore (6'0, 230); 45 Jake Harkleroad – graduate (5'10, 215); 47 CJ Murphy – (redshirt) freshman (6'1, 220); 48 Milad Aghaiepour – sophomore (5'10, 225); 52 Jonny Fritz – freshman (6'1, 190); 53 Gibson Macrae – sophomore (5'11, 220); 55 Cade Law – (redshirt) freshman (6'1, 225); Defensive back: 1 Antavious "Stick" Lane – graduate (5'9, 190); 2 Don Chapman – senior (6'1, 200); 6 Lejond Cavazos – junior (6'0, 200); 7 Derrik Allen – graduate (6'1, 210); 9 Armani Chatman – graduate (6'0, 205); 11 Ty Adams – freshman (5'11, 175); 13 Ayden Duncanson – freshman (6'0, 185); 15 Tre Miller – freshman (5'10, 175); 16 DeAndre Boykins – junior (5'11, 205); 18 Christopher Holliday – junior (6'4, 220); 20 Tayon Holloway – (redshirt) freshman (6'0, 185); 21 Kaleb Cost – freshman (5'10, 190); 26 D.J. Jones – graduate (5'10, 200); 27 Giovanni Biggers – graduate (6'1, 200); 28 Alijah Huzzie – junior (5'10, 200); 29 Marcus Allen – sophomore (6'1, 200); 31 Will Hardy – sophomore (6'2, 215); 35 Jaden Selby – (redshirt) freshman (6'0, 190)'; 37 Jack Blythe – freshman (6'2, 190); 38 Naari Short – junior (5'8, 185); 39 Major Byrd – freshman (5'9, 200); Long snappers: 43 Garrett Jordan – (redshirt) freshman (6'0, 225); 61 Drew Little – graduate (5'11, 245); 62 Spencer Triplett – junior (6'2, 235)
* North Carolina Tar Heels Football Roster as of 9/5/2023

== Schedule ==
The 2023 ACC conference football schedule was released on January 30, 2023. The 2023 season will be the conference's first season under a new single-division format. The 3-5-5 model gives each team three set conference opponents to play every season, while playing the remaining ten teams twice (once at home and once on the road) in a four–year cycle. The Tar Heels' non-rotating opponents are all traditional rivalries: Duke, NC State, and Virginia.

Date	Time	Opponent	Rank	Site	TV	Result	Attendance
September 2	7:30 p.m.	vs. South Carolina*	No. 21	Bank of America Stadium; Charlotte, NC (Duke's Mayo Classic, rivalry, College GameDay)	ABC	W 31–17	68,723
September 9	5:15 p.m.	Appalachian State*	No. 17	Kenan Stadium; Chapel Hill, NC	ACCN	W 40–34 ^{2OT}	50,500
September 16	3:30 p.m.	Minnesota*	No. 20	Kenan Stadium; Chapel Hill, NC	ESPN	W 31–13	50,500
September 23	8:00 p.m.	at Pittsburgh	No. 17	Acrisure Stadium; Pittsburgh, PA	ACCN	W 41–24	48,544
October 7	3:30 p.m.	Syracuse	No. 14	Kenan Stadium; Chapel Hill, NC	ESPN	W 40–7	50,500
October 14	7:30 p.m.	No. 25 Miami (FL)	No. 12	Kenan Stadium; Chapel Hill, NC	ABC	W 41–31	50,500
October 21	6:30 p.m.	Virginia	No. 10	Kenan Stadium; Chapel Hill, NC (South's Oldest Rivalry)	The CW	L 27–31	50,500
October 28	8:00 p.m.	at Georgia Tech	No. 17	Bobby Dodd Stadium; Atlanta, GA	ACCN	L 42–46	35,945
November 4	12:00 p.m.	Campbell*		Kenan Stadium; Chapel Hill, NC	ACCN	W 59–7	47,667
November 11	8:00 p.m.	Duke^{†}	No. 24	Kenan Stadium; Chapel Hill, NC (Victory Bell)	ACCN	W 47–45 ^{2OT}	50,500
November 18	3:30 p.m.	at Clemson	No. 20	Memorial Stadium; Clemson, SC	ESPN	L 20–31	81,305
November 25	8:00 p.m.	at No. 22 NC State		Carter-Finley Stadium; Raleigh, NC (rivalry)	ACCN	L 20–39	56,919
December 27	5:30 p.m.	vs. West Virginia*		Bank of America Stadium; Charlotte, NC (Duke's Mayo Bowl)	ESPN	L 10–30	42,925
*Non-conference game; ^{†}Homecoming; Rankings from AP Poll (and CFP Rankings, after October 31) - Released prior to game; All times are in Eastern time

== Game summaries ==
=== vs. South Carolina (Duke's Mayo Classic, rivalry) ===
Game One – No. 21 North Carolina Tar Heels (0-0) vs. South Carolina Gamecocks (0-0) – Game summary

Quarter	1	2	3	4	Total
No. 21 North Carolina	7	10	14	0	31
South Carolina	7	7	0	3	17

at Bank of America Stadium • Charlotte, North Carolina

- Date: Saturday, September 2, 2023
- Game time: 7:44 p.m. EST
- Game weather: Clear • 85 °F (29 °C) • Wind: NE 3 MPH
- Game attendance: 68,723
- Referee: Jeff Heaser
- TV announcers (ABC): Sean McDonough (play-by-play), Greg McElroy (color), Molly McGrath (sideline)

Game information

First quarter

- (9:50) UNC – Omarion Hampton 1-yard run (Ryan Coe kick) (Drive: 9 plays, 70 yards, 3:55; North Carolina 7-0)
- (6:29) SC – Dakereon Joyner 4-yard run (Mitch Jeter kick) (Drive: 8 plays, 75 yards, 3:21; Tied 7-7)

Second quarter

- (7:05) UNC – Ryan Coe 37-yard field goal (Drive: 13 plays, 42 yards, 6:20; North Carolina 10-7)
- (5:16) SC – Juju McDowell 1-yard run (Mitch Jeter kick) (Drive: 5 plays, 72 yards, 1:49; South Carolina 14-10)
- (2:50) UNC – Kobe Paysour 34-yard pass from Drake Maye (Ryan Coe kick) (Drive: 5 plays, 75 yards, 2:26; North Carolina 17-14)

Third quarter

- (11:35) UNC – Omarion Hampton 1-yard run (Ryan Coe kick) (Drive: 6 plays, 53 yards, 2:43; North Carolina 24-14)
- (6:29) UNC – John Copenhaver 18-yard pass from Drake Maye (Ryan Coe kick) (Drive: 8 plays, 55 yards, 3:25; North Carolina 31-14)

Fourth quarter

- (12:19) SC – Mitch Jeter 26-yard field goal (Drive: 12 plays, 61 yards, 4:55; North Carolina 31-17)

Statistics	UNC	SC
First downs	21	20
Total yards	71–437	70–351
Rushing yards	39–168	31– -2
Passing yards	269	353
Passing: Comp–Att–Int	24–32–2	30–39–0
Time of possession	32:37	27:23

Team	Category	Player	Statistics
North Carolina	Passing	Drake Maye	24/32, 269 yards, 2 TD, 2 INT
North Carolina	Rushing	British Brooks	15 carries, 103 yards
North Carolina	Receiving	Kobe Paysour	7 receptions, 66 yards, TD
South Carolina	Passing	Spencer Rattler	30/39, 353 yards
South Carolina	Rushing	Dakereon Joyner	12 carries, 23 yards, TD
South Carolina	Receiving	Xavier Legette	9 receptions, 178 yards

=== Appalachian State ===
Appalachian State vs. No. 17 North Carolina

Team	1	2	3	4	OT	2OT	Total
Mountaineers	0	10	7	10	7	0	34
• No. 17 Tar Heels	0	10	10	7	7	6	40

- Date: September 9, 2023
- Location: Kenan Stadium
  Chapel Hill, NC
- Game start: 5:18 p.m. EDT
- Elapsed time: 3 hours, 37 minutes
- Game attendance: 50,500
- Game weather: Cloudy • 71 °F (22 °C) • Wind: E 6 mph
- Referee: Gary Patterson
- TV announcers (ACCN): Wes Durham (play-by-play), Tim Hasselbeck (analyst), Taylor Tannenbaum (sideline)

Scoring summary
2	11:10	ASU	Michael Hughes 46 yd. field goal (19 plays, 66 yards, 8:10)	ASU 3–0
2	10:43	UNC	Omarion Hampton 68 yd. rush (Ryan Coe kick) (2 plays, 75 yards, 0:27)	UNC 7–3
2	7:14	ASU	Eli Wilson 5 yd. pass from Joey Aguilar (Michael Hughes kick) (9 plays, 75 yards, 3:29)	ASU 10–7
2	3:05	UNC	Ryan Coe 47 yd. field goal (9 plays, 46 yards, 4:09)	10–10
3	12:43	ASU	Dashaun Davis 33 yd. pass from Joey Aguilar (Michael Hughes kick) (6 plays, 75 yards, 2:17)	ASU 17–10
3	8:57	UNC	Caleb Hood 5 yd. rush (Ryan Coe kick) (11 plays, 75 yards, 3:46)	17–17
3	1:25	UNC	Ryan Coe 31 yd. field goal (11 plays, 51 yards, 5:01)	UNC 20–17
4	10:44	ASU	Nate Noel 7 yd. rush (Michael Hughes kick) (12 plays, 75 yards, 5:41)	ASU 24–20
4	9:19	UNC	Omarion Hampton 7 yd. rush (Ryan Coe kick) (4 plays, 75 yards, 1:25)	UNC 27–24
4	1:22	ASU	Michael Hughes 33 yd. field goal (12 plays, 69 yards, 2:48)	27–27
OT		ASU	Nate Noel 7 yd. rush (Michael Hughes kick) (3 plays, 25 yards)	ASU 34–27
OT		UNC	Omarion Hampton 17 yd. rush (Ryan Coe kick) (3 plays, 25 yards)	34–34
2OT		UNC	Drake Maye 13 yd. rush (Drake Maye rush failed) (3 plays, 25 yards)	UNC 40–34

Statistics	App	UNC
First downs	30	27
Plays–yards	87–494	75–527
Rushes–yards	44–219	45–319
Passing yards	275	208
Passing: comp–att–int	22–43–1	21–30
Turnovers		
Time of possession	33:29	26:21

Team	Category	Player	Statistics
App	Passing	Joey Aguilar	22/43, 275 yards, 2 TD, INT
App	Rushing	Nate Noel	26 carries, 127 yards, 2 TD
App	Receiving	Dashaun Davis	7 receptions, 117 yards, TD
UNC	Passing	Drake Maye	21/30, 208 yards
UNC	Rushing	Omarion Hampton	26 carries, 234 yards, 3 TD
UNC	Receiving	J.J. Jones	5 receptions, 91 yards

=== Minnesota ===
Minnesota vs. No 20 North Carolina

Team	1	2	3	4	Total
Golden Gophers	0	10	3	0	13
• No. 20 Tar Heels	7	14	3	7	31

- Date: September 16, 2023
- Location: Kenan Stadium
  Chapel Hill, NC
- Game start: 3:35 p.m. EDT
- Elapsed time: 3 hours 12 minutes
- Game attendance: 50,500
- Game weather: Sunny • 85 °F (29 °C) • Wind: W 4 MPH
- Referee: Riley Johnson
- TV announcers (ESPN): Beth Mowins (play-by-play), Kirk Morrison (analyst), Stormy Buonantony (sideline)

Scoring summary
1	11:47	UNC	Nate McCollum 46 yd. pass from Drake Maye (Noah Burnette kick) (9 plays, 75 yards, 3:13)	UNC 7–0
2	13:17	UNC	Omarion Hampton 1 yd. rush (Noah Burnette kick) (6 plays, 80 yards, 2:25)	UNC 14–0
2	9:47	MIN	Dragan Kesich 23 yd. field goal (7 plays, 11 yards, 2:29)	UNC 14–3
2	2:23	UNC	Bryson Nesbit 19 yd. pass from Drake Maye (Noah Burnette kick) (7 plays, 80 yards, 2:29)	UNC 21–3
2	0:30	MIN	Darius Taylor 2 yd. rush (Dragan Kesich kick) (7 plays, 75 yards, 1:53)	UNC 21–10
3	10:22	MIN	Dragan Kesich 42 yd. field goal (9 plays, 48 yards, 4:38)	UNC 21–13
3	1:26	UNC	Noah Burnette 42 yd. field goal (8 plays, 56 yards, 1:26)	UNC 24–13
4	5:00	UNC	British Brooks 1 yd. rush (Noah Burnette kick) (11 plays, 76 yards, 5:23)	UNC 31–13

Statistics	MIN	UNC
First downs	19	26
Plays–yards	61–303	77–519
Rushes–yards	31–170	37–105
Passing yards	133	414
Passing: comp–att–int	11–30–2	29–40–2
Turnovers		
Time of possession	26:50	33:10

Team	Category	Player	Statistics
MIN	Passing	Athan Kaliakmanis	11/29, 133 yards, INT
MIN	Rushing	Darius Taylor	22 carries, 138 yards, TD
MIN	Receiving	Corey Crooms	4 receptions, 46 yards
UNC	Passing	Drake Maye	29/40, 414 yards, 2 TD, 2 INT
UNC	Rushing	Omarion Hampton	13 carries, 46 yards, TD
UNC	Receiving	Nate McCollum	15 receptions, 165 yards, TD

=== at Pittsburgh ===
No. 17 North Carolina vs. Pittsburgh

Team	1	2	3	4	Total
• No. 17 Tar Heels	7	21	13	0	41
Panthers	7	10	7	0	24

- Date: September 23, 2023
- Location: Acrisure Stadium
  Pittsburgh, PA
- Game start: 8:05 p.m. EDT
- Elapsed time: 3 hours, 27 minutes
- Game attendance: 48,544
- Game weather: Rainy • 57 °F (14 °C) • Wind: NW 9 MPH
- Referee: Stuart Mullins
- TV announcers (ACCN): Wes Durham (play-by-play), Tim Hasselbeck (analyst), Taylor Tannenbaum (sideline)

Scoring summary
1	6:56	PITT	Rodney Hammond Jr. 7 yd. rush (Ben Sauls kick) (13 plays, 78 yards, 7:59)	PITT 7–0
1	3:38	UNC	Omarion Hampton 3 yd. rush (Noah Burnette kick) (10 plays, 75 yards, 3:18)	7–7
2	14:55	PITT	Daniel Carter 1 yd. rush (Ben Sauls kick) (7 plays, 75 yards, 3:43)	PITT 14–7
2	9:09	UNC	Drake Maye 1 yd. rush (Noah Burnette kick) (7 plays, 75 yards, 3:43)	14—14
2	7:23	UNC	Alijah Huzzie 52 yd. punt return (Noah Burnette kick)	UNC 21–14
2	3:38	PITT	Ben Sauls 44 yd. field goal (7 plays, 49 yards, 3:45)	UNC 21–17
2	1:00	UNC	Kobe Paysour 7 yd. pass from Drake Maye (7 plays, 91 yards, 2:31)	UNC 28–17
3	12:32	UNC	Drake Maye 1 yd. rush (Noah Burnette kick) (8 plays, 75 yards, 2:28)	UNC 35–17
3	8:44	UNC	Noah Burnette 43 yd. field goal (7 plays, 55 yards, 2:52)	UNC 38–17
3	8:32	PITT	Kenny Johnson 100 yd. kickoff return (Ben Sauls kick)	UNC 38–24
3	3:58	UNC	Noah Burnette 48 yd. field goal (10 plays, 45 yards, 4:34)	UNC 41–24

Statistics	UNC	PITT
First downs	22	18
Plays–yards	69–373	60–304
Rushes–yards	39–77	27–110
Passing yards	296	196
Passing: comp–att–int	22–30–0	18–33–2
Turnovers		
Time of possession	31:07	28:53

Team	Category	Player	Statistics
UNC	Passing	Drake Maye	22/30, 296 yards, TD
UNC	Rushing	Omarion Hampton	18 carries, 66 yards, TD
UNC	Receiving	J.J. Jones	6 receptions, 117 yards
PITT	Passing	Phil Jurkovec	11/15, 109 yards
PITT	Rushing	Rodney Hammond Jr.	14 carries, 83 yards, TD
PITT	Receiving	Konata Mumpfield	8 receptions, 90 yards

=== Syracuse ===
Syracuse vs. No. 14 North Carolina

Team	1	2	3	4	Total
Orange	0	0	7	0	7
• No. 14 Tar Heels	10	17	10	3	40

- Date: October 7, 2023
- Location: Kenan Stadium • Chapel Hill, NC
- Game start: 3:36 p.m. EDT
- Elapsed time: 3 hours, 3 minutes
- Game attendance: 50,500
- Game weather: Sunny • 71 °F (22 °C) • Wind: NW 15 MPH
- Referee: Marcus Woods
- TV announcers (ESPN): Dave Pasch (play-by-play), Dusty Dvoracek (analyst), Tom Luginbill (analyst)

Scoring summary
1	10:51	UNC	Noah Burnette 29 yd. field goal (14 plays, 64 yards, 4:09)	UNC 3–0
1	1:33	UNC	Drake Maye 1 yd. rush (Noah Burnette kick) (17 plays, 94 yards, 7:27)	UNC 10–0
2	12:36	UNC	Bryson Nesbit 23 yd. pass from Drake Maye (Noah Burnette kick) (9 plays, 77 yards, 2:25)	UNC 17–0
2	6:10	UNC	John Copenhaver 1 yd. pass from Drake Maye (Noah Burnette kick) (9 plays, 95 yards, 3:13)	UNC 24–0
2	0:07	UNC	Noah Burnette 24 yd. field goal (12 plays, 72 yards, 3:25)	UNC 27–0
3	11:15	SU	LeQuint Allen 1 yd. rush (Brady Denaburg kick) (9 plays, 75 yards, 3:45)	UNC 27–7
3	6:46	UNC	Noah Burnette 36 yd. field goal (10 plays, 57 yards, 4:29)	UNC 30–7
3	1:41	UNC	Kobe Paysour 77 yd. pass from Drake Maye (Noah Burnette kick) (4 plays, 83 yards, 1:24)	UNC 37–7
4	5:08	UNC	Noah Burnette 31 yd. field goal (17 plays, 62 yards, 8:09)	UNC 40–7

Statistics	SU	UNC
First downs	11	33
Plays–yards	51–221	97–644
Rushes–yards	28–92	48–202
Passing yards	129	442
Passing: comp–att–int	16–23–2	33–49–0
Turnovers		
Time of possession	22:44	37:16

Team	Category	Player	Statistics
SU	Passing	Garrett Shrader	15/21, 124 yards, INT
SU	Rushing	LeQuint Allen	11 carries, 38 yards, TD
SU	Receiving	Umari Hatcher	6 receptions, 85 yards
UNC	Passing	Drake Maye	33/47, 442 yards, 3 TD
UNC	Rushing	Omarion Hampton	15 carries, 78 yards
UNC	Receiving	Nate McCollum	7 receptions, 135 yards

=== Miami (FL) ===
No. 25 Miami vs. No. 12 North Carolina

Team	1	2	3	4	Total
No. 25 Hurricanes	0	17	0	14	31
• No. 12 Tar Heels	7	7	21	6	41

- Date: October 14, 2023
- Location: Kenan Stadium • Chapel Hill, NC
- Game start: 7:49 p.m. EDT
- Elapsed time: 3 hours and 44 minutes
- Game attendance: 50,500
- Game weather: Clear • 64 °F (18 °C) • Wind: W 5 MPH
- Referee: Adam Savoie
- TV announcers (ABC): Sean McDonough (play-by-play), Greg McElroy (analyst), Molly McGrath (sideline)

Scoring summary
1	6:26	UNC	Tez Walker 18 yd. pass from Drake Maye (Noah Burnette kick) (8 plays, 91 yards, 3:00)	UNC 7–0
2	12:26	UM	Xavier Restrepo 18 yd. pass from Tyler Van Dyke (Andres Borregales kick) (4 plays, 63 yards, 1:52)	7–7
2	5:17	UM	Jacolby George 35 yd. pass from Tyler Van Dyke (Andres Borregales kick) (11 plays, 92 yards, 5:27)	UM 14–7
2	2:05	UNC	Omarion Hampton 2 yd. rush (Noah Burnette kick) (9 plays, 75 yards, 3:12)	14–14
2	0:00	UM	Andres Borregales 28 yd. field goal (7 plays, 57 yards, 0:55)	UM 17–14
3	13:12	UNC	Tez Walker 56 yd. pass from Drake Maye (Noah Burnette kick) (4 plays, 75 yards, 1:48)	UNC 21–17
3	8:11	UNC	Tez Walker 33 yd. pass from Drake Maye (Noah Burnette kick) (3 plays, 23 yards, 0:44)	UNC 28–17
3	2:53	UNC	Omarion Hampton 4 yd. pass from Drake Maye (Noah Burnette kick) (9 plays, 63 yards, 3:07)	UNC 35–17
4	11:01	UNC	Noah Burnette 34 yd. field goal (8 plays, 39 yards, 3:53)	UNC 38–17
4	7:14	UM	Xavier Restrepo 13 yd. pass from Tyler Van Dyke (Andres Borregales kick) (12 plays, 71 yards, 3:47)	UNC 38–24
4	3:17	UNC	Noah Burnette 23 yd. field goal (6 plays, 66 yards, 3:56)	UNC 41–24
4	2:17	UNC	Brashard Smith 54 yd. pass from Tyler Van Dyke (Andres Borregales kick) (3 plays, 61 yards, 0:56)

Statistics	UM	UNC
First downs	28	24
Plays–yards	76–482	76–508
Rushes–yards	27–91	43–235
Passing yards	391	273
Passing: comp–att–int	31–49–2	17–33–0
Turnovers		
Time of possession	30:04	29:56

Team	Category	Player	Statistics
UM	Passing	Tyler Van Dyke	31/48, 391 yards, 4 TD
UM	Rushing	Henry Parrish Jr.	13 carries, 73 yards, TD
UM	Receiving	Xavier Restrepo	11 receptions, 96 yards, 2 TD
UNC	Passing	Drake Maye	17/33, 273 yards, 4 TD
UNC	Rushing	Omarion Hampton	24 carries, 197 yards, TD
UNC	Receiving	Tez Walker	6 receptions, 132 yards, 3 TD

=== Virginia (South's Oldest Rivalry) ===
Virginia vs. No. 10 North Carolina

Team	1	2	3	4	Total
• Cavaliers	14	0	10	7	31
No. 10 Tar Heels	7	10	7	3	27

- Date: October 21, 2023
- Location: Kenan Stadium • Chapel Hill, NC
- Game start: 6:37 p.m. EDT
- Elapsed time: 3 hours, 21 minutes
- Game attendance: 50,500
- Game weather: Clear • 63 °F (17 °C) • Wind: W 6 MPH
- Referee: Riley Johnson
- TV announcers (The CW): Tom Werme (play-by-play), James Bates (analyst), Treavor Scales (sideline)

Scoring summary
1	11:05	UVA	Mike Hollins 11 yd. rush (Will Bettridge kick) (7 plays, 51 yards, 2:53)	UVA 7–0
1	8:36	UNC	Tez Walker 25 yd. pass from Drake Maye (Noah Burnette kick) (8 plays, 75 yards, 2:29)	7–7
1	1:56	UVA	Mike Hollins 3 yd. rush (Will Bettridge kick) (7 plays, 46 yards, 3:25)	UVA 14–7
2	13:12	UNC	Bryson Nesbit 62 yd. pass from Drake Maye (Noah Burnette kick) (3 plays, 79 yards, 1:02)	14–14
2	0:00	UNC	Noah Burnette 43 yd. field goal (7 plays, 54 yards, 0:58)	UNC 17–14
3	9:35	UNC	Drake Maye 3 yd. rush (Noah Burnette kick) (7 plays, 60 yards, 2:25)	UNC 24–14
3	3:56	UVA	Mike Hollins 1 yd. rush (Will Bettridge kick) (13 plays, 74 yards, 5:39)	UNC 24–21
3	0:32	UVA	Will Bettridge 45 yd. field goal (4 plays, 6 yards, 1:30)	24–24
4	12:08	UNC	Noah Burnette 27 yd. field goal (11 plays, 65 yards, 3:24)	UNC 27–24
4	8:51	UVA	Malik Washington 14 yd. pass from Tony Muskett (Will Bettridge kick) (7 plays, 73 yards, 3:12)	UVA 31–27

Statistics	UVA	UNC
First downs	26	26
Plays–yards	84–436	77–490
Rushes–yards	54–228	29–143
Passing yards	208	347
Passing: comp–att–int	20–30–1	24–48–1
Turnovers		
Time of possession	37:06	22:54

Team	Category	Player	Statistics
UVA	Passing	Tony Muskett	20/30, 208 yards, TD, INT
UVA	Rushing	Perris Jones	14 carries, 67 yards
UVA	Receiving	Malik Washington	12 receptions, 115 yards, TD
UNC	Passing	Drake Maye	24/48, 347 yards, 2 TD, INT
UNC	Rushing	Omarion Hampton	19 carries, 112 yards
UNC	Receiving	Tez Walker	11 receptions, 146 yards, TD

=== at Georgia Tech ===
No. 17 North Carolina vs. Georgia Tech

Team	1	2	3	4	Total
No. 17 Tar Heels	14	14	7	7	42
• Yellow Jackets	0	22	0	24	46

- Date: October 28, 2023
- Location: Bobby Dodd Stadium • Atlanta, GA
- Game start: 8:06 p.m. EDT
- Elapsed time: 3 hours, 26 minutes
- Game attendance: 35,945
- Game weather: Sunny • 71 °F (22 °C) • Wind: SE 4 MPH
- Referee: Mike Roache
- TV announcers (ACCN): Wes Durham (play-by-play), Tim Hasselbeck (analyst), Taylor Tannenbaum (sideline)

Scoring summary
1	9:31	UNC	Bryson Nesbit 14 yd. pass from Drake Maye (Noah Burnette kick) (9 plays, 75 yards, 3:02)	UNC 7–0
1	4:30	UNC	Omarion Hampton 17 yd. rush (Noah Burnette kick) (6 plays, 46 yards, 2:10)	UNC 14–0
2	11:32	GT	Malik Rutherford 42 yd. pass from Haynes King (Aidan Birr kick) (5 plays, 69 yards, 1:25)	UNC 14–7
2	9:24	UNC	British Brooks 7 yd. rush (Noah Burnette kick) (6 plays, 75 yards, 2:08)	UNC 21–7
2	6:53	GT	Brett Seither 35 yd. pass from Haynes King (Aidan Birr kick) (6 plays, 75 yards, 2:31)	UNC 21–14
2	2:46	GT	Malik Rutherford 14 yd. pass from Haynes King (Aidan Birr kick) (8 plays, 86 yards, 3:05)	21–21
2	0:45	UNC	Omarion Hampton 3 yd. rush (Noah Burnette kick) (8 plays, 75 yards, 2:01)	UNC 28–21
2	0:00	GT	Aidan Birr 40 yd. field goal (8 plays, 52 yards, 0:45)	UNC 28–24
3	6:03	UNC	Drake Maye 14 yd. rush (Noah Burnette kick) (13 plays, 85 yards, 6:49)	UNC 35–24
4	12:02	GT	Jamal Haynes 4 yd. rush (Malik Rutherford pass from Haynes King) (9 plays, 88 yards, 2:50)	UNC 35–32
4	11:13	UNC	Tychaun "Doc" Chapman 35 yd. pass from Drake Maye (Noah Burnette kick) (2 plays, 38 yards, 0:39)	UNC 42–32
4	10:40	GT	Dontae Smith 70 yd. rush (Aidan Birr kick) (2 plays, 75 yards, 0:33)	UNC 42–39
4	4:28	GT	Brett Seither 5 yd. pass from Haynes King (Aidan Birr kick) (6 plays, 79 yards, 2:32)	GT 46–42

Statistics	UNC	GT
First downs	25	29
Plays–yards	72–577	78–639
Rushes–yards	47–267	48–348
Passing yards	310	287
Passing: comp–att–int	17–25–0	23–30–1
Turnovers		
Time of possession	32:04	27:56

Team	Category	Player	Statistics
UNC	Passing	Drake Maye	17/25, 310 yards, 2 TD
UNC	Rushing	Omarion Hampton	29 carries, 153 yards, 2 TD
UNC	Receiving	Bryson Nesbit	3 receptions, 89 yards, TD
GT	Passing	Haynes King	23/30, 287 yards, 4 TD
GT	Rushing	Dontae Smith	22 carries, 178 yards, TD
GT	Receiving	Eric Singleton, Jr.	8 receptions, 117 yards, TD

=== Campbell ===
Campbell vs. North Carolina

Team	1	2	3	4	Total
Fighting Camels	7	0	0	0	7
• Tar Heels	7	21	17	14	59

- Date: November 4, 2023
- Location: Kenan Stadium • Chapel Hill, NC
- Game start: 12:03 p.m. EDT
- Elapsed time: 3 hours, 13 minutes
- Game attendance: 47,667
- Game weather: Sunny • 62 °F (17 °C) • Wind: N 4 MPH
- Referee: Gary Patterson
- TV announcers (ACCN): Jorge Sedano (play-by-play), Orlando Franklin (analyst), Marilyn Payne (sideline)

Scoring summary
1	6:20	UNC	Tez Walker 10 yd. pass from Drake Maye (Noah Burnette kick) (8 plays, 51 yards, 2:39)	UNC 7–0
1	1:40	CU	Chaney Fitzgerald 19 yd. pass from Hajj-Malik Williams (Caleb Dowden kick) (7 plays, 62 yards, 4:32)	7–7
2	8:56	UNC	Omarion Hampton 54 yd. rush (Noah Burnette kick) (5 plays, 76 yards, 1:45)	UNC 14–7
2	2:36	UNC	Tez Walker 31 yd. pass from Drake Maye (Noah Burnette kick) (4 plays, 80 yards, 1:11)	UNC 21–7
2	0:27	UNC	Omarion Hampton 4 yd. rush (Noah Burnette kick) (9 plays, 49 yards, 1:42)	UNC 28–7
3	14:23	UNC	John Copenhaver 25 yd. pass from Drake Maye (Noah Burnette kick) (3 plays, 75 yards, 0:37)	UNC 35–7
3	7:13	UNC	J.J. Jones 21 yd. pass from Drake Maye (Noah Burnette kick) (3 plays, 16 yards, 0:42)	UNC 42–7
3	1:26	UNC	Noah Burnette 43 yd. field goal (6 plays, 31 yards, 2:42)	UNC 45–7
4	8:58	UNC	Conner Harrell 61 yd. rush (Noah Burnette kick) (4 plays, 80 yards, 1:28)	UNC 52–7
4	7:13	UNC	Chris Culliver 41 yd. pass from Conner Harrell (Noah Burnette kick) (1 play, 41 yards, 0:06)	UNC 59–7

Statistics	CU	UNC
First downs	20	26
Plays–yards	79–287	61–594
Rushes–yards	42–102	33–276
Passing yards	185	318
Passing: comp–att–int	25–37–1	21–28–0
Turnovers		
Time of possession	38:26	21:34

Team	Category	Player	Statistics
CU	Passing	Hajj-Malik Williams	25/37, 185 yards, INT
CU	Rushing	Hajj-Malik Williams	11 carries, 51 yards
CU	Receiving	Ezeriah Anderson	9 receptions, 102 yards
UNC	Passing	Drake Maye	16/23, 244 yards, 4 TD
UNC	Rushing	Omarion Hampton	15 carries, 144 yards, 2 TD
UNC	Receiving	Bryson Nesbit	6 receptions, 78 yards

=== Duke (Victory Bell) ===
Duke vs. No. 24 North Carolina

Team	1	2	3	4	OT	2OT	Total
Blue Devils	0	14	0	22	3	6	45
• No. 24 Tar Heels	10	6	3	17	3	8	47

- Date: November 11, 2023
- Location: Kenan Stadium • Chapel Hill, NC
- Game start: 8:06 p.m. EST
- Elapsed time: 3 hours, 45 minutes
- Game attendance: 50,500
- Game weather: Cloudy • 51 °F (11 °C) • Wind E 3 MPH
- Referee: Jeff Flanagan
- TV announcers (ACCN): Wes Durham (play-by-play), Tim Hasselbeck (analyst), Taylor Tannenbaum (sideline)

Scoring summary
1	10:44	UNC	Drake Maye 1 yd. rush (Noah Burnette kick) (10 plays, 75 yards, 4:16)	UNC 7–0
1	5:53	UNC	Noah Burnette 23 yd. field goal (11 plays, 67 yards, 3:55)	UNC 10–0
2	11:38	UNC	Noah Burnette 31 yd. field goal (11 plays, 67 yards, 3:51)	UNC 13–0
2	5:18	Duke	Jordan Moore 10 yd. pass from Grayson Loftis (Todd Pelino kick) (9 plays, 70 yards, 6:13)	UNC 13–7
2	2:07	Duke	Grayson Loftis 3 yd. rush (Todd Pelino kick) (5 plays, 14 yards, 2:59)	Duke 14–13
2	0:23	UNC	Noah Burnette 25 yd. field goal (8 plays, 66 yards, 1:39)	UNC 16–14
3	6:49	UNC	Noah Burnette 27 yd. field goal (16 plays, 55 yards, 6:41)	UNC 19–14
4	14:55	UNC	Omarion Hampton 2 yd. rush (Noah Burnette kick) (7 plays, 73 yards, 2:23)	UNC 26–14
4	9:41	Duke	Jordan Waters 13 yd. rush (Todd Pelino kick) (7 plays, 70 yards, 3:15)	UNC 26–21
4	5:21	Duke	Jordan Waters 23 yd. rush (Jalon Calhoun pass from Grayson Loftis) (8 plays, 54 yards, 4:19)	Duke 29–26
4	1:55	UNC	Bryson Nesbit 15 yd. pass from Drake Maye (Noah Burnette kick) (10 plays, 75 yards, 3:26)	UNC 33–29
4	0:41	Duke	Jordan Moore 30 yd. pass from Grayson Loftis (Todd Pelino kick) (9 plays, 75 yards, 1:14)	Duke 36–33
4	0:00	UNC	Noah Burnette 43 yd. field goal (6 plays, 50 yards, 0:41)	36–36
OT		Duke	Todd Pelino 49 yd. field goal (4 plays, -7 yards)	Duke 39–36
OT		UNC	Noah Burnette 24 yd. field goal (6 plays, 19 yards)	39–39
2OT		UNC	Drake Maye 5 yd. rush (John Copenhaver pass from Drake Maye) (4 plays, 25 yards)	UNC 47–39
2OT		Duke	Jordan Moore 6 yd. pass from Grayson Loftis (Jalon Calhoun pass from Grayson Loftis failed) (6 plays, 25 yards)	UNC 47–45

Statistics	Duke	UNC
First downs	22	30
Plays–yards	72–379	87–537
Rushes–yards	43–179	44–195
Passing yards	200	342
Passing: comp–att–int	17–29–0	28–43–1
Turnovers		
Time of possession	31:24	28:36

Team	Category	Player	Statistics
Duke	Passing	Grayson Loftis	16/28, 189 yards, 3 TD
Duke	Rushing	Jordan Waters	20 carries, 113 yards, 2 TD
Duke	Receiving	Jordan Moore	6 receptions, 88 yards, 3 TD
UNC	Passing	Drake Maye	28/43, 342, TD, INT
UNC	Rushing	Omarion Hampton	31 carries, 169 yards, TD
UNC	Receiving	Tez Walker	7 receptions, 162 yards

=== at Clemson ===
North Carolina vs. Clemson

Team	1	2	3	4	Total
No. 20 Tar Heels	7	0	7	6	20
• Tigers	0	14	14	3	31

- Date: November 18, 2023
- Location: Memorial Stadium • Clemson, SC
- Game start: 3:40 p.m. EST
- Elapsed time: 3 hours, 50 minutes
- Game attendance: 81,305
- Game weather: Sunny • 75 °F (24 °C) • Wind: S 2 MPH
- Referee: Marcus Woods
- TV announcers (ESPN): Bob Wischusen (play-by-play), Robert Griffin III (analyst), Kris Budden (sideline)

Scoring summary
1	4:31	UNC	J.J. Jones 33 yd. pass from Drake Maye (Noah Burnette kick) (4 plays, 46 yards, 1:22)	UNC 7–0
2	10:10	CU	Jake Briningstool 3 yd. pass from Cade Klubnik (Jonathan Weitz kick) (14 plays, 80 yards, 6:29)	7–7
2	0:03	CU	Cade Klubnik 3 yd. rush (Jonathan Weitz kick) (11 plays, 57 yards, 1:11)	CU 14–7
3	7:15	CU	Phil Mafah 3 yd. rush (Jonathan Weitz kick) (7 plays, 56 yards, 3:33)	CU 21–7
3	6:20	UNC	Omarion Hampton 55 yd. rush (Noah Burnette kick) (3 plays, 75 yards, 0:55)	CU 21–14
3	3:19	CU	Will Shipley 33 yd. rush (Jonathan Weitz kick) (6 plays, 75 yards, 3:01)	CU 28–14
4	10:33	CU	Jonathan Weitz 21 yd. field goal (11 plays, 88 yards, 5:14)	CU 31–14
4	7:03	UNC	Omarion Hampton 3 yd. rush (Nate McCollum pass from Drake Maye failed) (9 plays, 75 yards, 3:30)	CU 31–20

Statistics	UNC	CLEM
First downs	19	25
Plays–yards	69–457	89–466
Rushes–yards	32–248	55–247
Passing yards	209	219
Passing: comp–att–int	16–37–1	21–34–0
Turnovers		
Time of possession	21:49	

Team	Category	Player	Statistics
UNC	Passing	Drake Maye	16/36, 209 yards, TD, INT
UNC	Rushing	Omarion Hampton	19 carries, 178 yards, 2 TD
UNC	Receiving	Tez Walker	4 receptions, 70 yards
CLEM	Passing	Cade Klubnik	21/32, 219 yards, TD
CLEM	Rushing	Will Shipley	18 carries, 126 yards, TD
CLEM	Receiving	Adam Randall	2 receptions, 57 yards

=== at NC State (Rivalry) ===
North Carolina vs. NC State

Team	1	2	3	4	Total
Tar Heels	0	7	13	0	20
• No. 22 Wolfpack	6	20	13	0	39

- Date: November 25, 2023
- Location: Carter-Finley Stadium • Raleigh, NC
- Game start: 8:07 p.m. EST
- Elapsed time: 3 hours, 22 minutes
- Game attendance: 56,919
- Game weather: Clear • 39 °F (4 °C) • Wind: NE 3 MPH
- Referee: Adam Savoie
- TV announcers (ACCN): Wes Durham (play-by-play), Tim Hasselbeck (analyst), Taylor Tannenbaum (sideline)

Scoring summary
1	10:35	NSCU	Brayden Narveson 32 yd. field goal (6 plays, 43 yards, 3:15)	NCSU 3–0
1	5:32	NCSU	Brayden Narveson 40 yd. field goal (8 plays, 24 yards, 3:54)	NCSU 6–0
2	12:56	NCSU	KC Concepcion 11 yd. pass from Brennan Armstrong (Brayden Narveson kick) (11 plays, 83 yards, 5:53)	NCSU 13–0
2	10:15	NCSU	KC Concepcion 6 yd. pass from Brennan Armstrong (Brayden Narveson kick) (4 plays, 55 yards, 1:39)	NCSU 20–0
2	5:57	NCSU	Brayden Narveson 28 yd. field goal (7 plays, 46 yards, 2:57)	NCSU 23–0
2	4:34	UNC	John Copenhaver 15 yd. pass from Drake Maye (Noah Burnette kick) (4 plays, 75 yards, 1:23)	NCSU 23–7
2	0:00	NCSU	Brayden Narveson 24 yd. field goal (13 plays, 70 yards, 4:28)	NCSU 26–7
3	10:26	NCSU	Dacari Collins 20 yd. pass from Brennan Armstrong (Brayden Narveson kick) (8 plays, 75 yards, 4:34)	NCSU 33–7
3	8:50	UNC	Drake Maye 1 yd. rush (Noah Burnette kick) (6 plays, 75 yards, 1:36)	NCSU 33–14
3	7:54	NCSU	Delbert Mimms, III 7 yd. rush (Juice Vereen pass from Brennan Armstrong failed) (3 plays, 75 yards, 0:56)	NCSU 39–14
3	5:44	UNC	Tez Walker 0 yd. pass from Drake Maye (John Copenhaver pass from Drake Maye failed) (10 plays, 75 yards, 2:10)	NCSU 39–20

Statistics	UNC	NCSU
First downs	21	25
Plays–yards	59–384	74–504
Rushes–yards	21–130	43–170
Passing yards	254	334
Passing: comp–att–int	22–38–2	22–31–0
Turnovers		
Time of possession	19:54	40:00

Team	Category	Player	Statistics
UNC	Passing	Drake Maye	22/38, 254, 2 TD, 2 INT
UNC	Rushing	Drake Maye	9 carries, 106 yards, TD
UNC	Receiving	John Copenhaver	5 receptions, 64 yards, TD
NCSU	Passing	Brennan Armstrong	22/31, 334 yards, 3 TD
NCSU	Rushing	KC Concepcion	11 carries, 55 yards
NCSU	Receiving	KC Concepcion	7 receptions, 131 yards, 2 TD

=== vs. West Virginia (Duke's Mayo Bowl) ===
North Carolina vs. West Virginia

Team	1	2	3	4	Total
Tar Heels	0	10	0	0	10
• Mountaineers	7	10	3	10	30

- Date: December 27, 2023
- Location: Bank of America Stadium • Charlotte, NC
- Game start: 5:36 P.M. EST
- Elapsed time: 3 hours, 13 minutes
- Game attendance: 42,925
- Game weather: Cloudy • 59 °F (15 °C) • Wind: SE 3 MPH
- Referee: Jerry McGinn (Big Ten)
- TV announcers (ESPN): Matt Barrie (play-by-play), Dan Mullen (analyst), Harry Lyles Jr. (sideline)

Scoring summary
1	14:49	WVU	Traylon Ray 75 yd. pass from Garrett Greene (Michael Hayes kick) (1 play, 75 yards, 0:11)	WVU 7–0
2	8:34	UNC	Noah Burnette 28 yd. field goal (14 plays, 45 yards, 7:13)	WVU 7–3
2	1:29	WVU	Beanie Bishop Jr. 78 yd. punt return (2:16)	WVU 14–3
2	0:27	UNC	JJ Jones 16 yd. pass from Conner Harrell (Noah Burnette kick) (5 plays, 76 yards, 0:58)	WVU 14–10
2	0:00	WVU	Michael Hayes 30 yd. field goal (6 plays, 63 yards, 0:27)	WVU 17–10
3	2:40	WVU	Michael Hayes 34 yd. field goal (8 plays, 54 yards, 3:46)	WVU 20–10
4	12:48	WVU	Jahiem White 11 yd. rush (Michael Hayes kick) (3 plays, 78 yards, 1:56)	WVU 27–10
4	7:58	WVU	Michael Hayes 29 yd. field goal (8 plays, 15 yards, 3:27)	WVU 30–10

Statistics	UNC	WVU
First downs	20	16
Plays–yards	68–339	53–392
Rushes–yards	41–140	30–164
Passing yards	199	228
Passing: comp–att–int	18–27–2	12–23–0
Turnovers		
Time of possession	34:39	25:21

Team	Category	Player	Statistics
UNC	Passing	Conner Harrell	18/27, 199 yards, TD, 2 INT
UNC	Rushing	Omarion Hampton	19 carries, 62 yards
UNC	Receiving	Gavin Blackwell	3 receptions, 78 yards
WVU	Passing	Garrett Greene	12/23, 228 yards, TD
WVU	Rushing	Garrett Greene	9 carries, 64 yards
WVU	Receiving	Traylon Ray	3 receptions, 91 yards, TD

== Rankings ==
Ranking movements Legend: ██ Increase in ranking ██ Decrease in ranking — = Not ranked RV = Received votes
	Week															
Poll	Pre	1	2	3	4	5	6	7	8	9	10	11	12	13	14	Final
AP	21	17	20	17	15	14	12	10	17	RV	24	22	RV	RV		
Coaches	20	16	18	17	15	13	12	10	17	25	23	20	RV	—		
CFP	Not released									—	24	20	—	—		Not released

== After the season ==
=== All-Conference Selections ===
==== 1st team ====
- Omarion Hampton (RB)
- Bryson Nesbit (TE)
- Cedric Gray (LB)

==== 2nd team ====
- Drake Maye (QB)
- Kaimon Rucker (DE)
- Noah Burnette (PK)

==== 3rd team ====
- Willie Lampkin (OL)
- Tez Walker (WR)
- Power Echols (LB)

==== Honorable Mention ====
- Spencer Rolland (OL)
- Corey Gaynor (OL)
- Myles Murphy (DT)
- Alijah Huzzie (DB)

=== All-America Selections ===
- Omarion Hampton (1st Team, WCFF; 2nd team CBS Sports, AP)

=== Departures ===
==== Transfer Portal Entries ====
The following members of the 2023 Tar Heel football team entered the transfer portal in the postseason window.

Name	No.	Pos.	Height	Weight	Hometown	Year	New school
Kedrick Bingley-Jones	41	DL	6'4"	305	Concord, NC	Junior	Mississippi State
Jefferson Boaz	14	QB	6'7"	235	Pilot Mountain, NC	Junior	Stephen F. Austin
Jalen Brooks	36	LB	5'10"	240	Knightdale, NC	Junior	Campbell
Deuce Caldwell	44	LB	6'0"	230	Mauldin, SC	Sophomore	TBD
Chance Carroll	54	OL	6'2"	295	Mooresville, NC	Junior	Georgia Southern
Tychaun Chapman	0	WR	5'9"	175	Virginia Beach, VA	R-Fr.	Marshall
Sebastian Cheeks	32	LB	6'2"	230	Skokie, IL	R-Fr.	Wisconsin
Ryan Coe	40	PK	6'2"	225	McDonald, PA	Graduate	Cal
Elijah Green	21	RB	5'11"	210	Roswell, GA	Junior	Indiana
Andre Greene Jr.	1	WR	6'2"	200	Richmond, VA	R-Fr.	Virginia
Tayon Holloway	20	DB	6'0"	185	Virginia Beach, VA	R-Fr.	Louisville
D.J. Jones	26	DB/RB	5'10"	200	Fayetteville, NC	Graduate	Wyoming
Justin Kanyuk	74	OL	6'6"	315	Lehigh Valley, PA	R-Fr.	Georgia Southern
Cole Maynard	92	P	6'1"	180	Mooresville, NC	Sophomore	Western Kentucky
Kamari Morales	88	TE	6'2"	245	Buck Lake, FL	Graduate	Boston College
George Pettaway	23	RB	5'10"	195	Suffolk, VA	Sophomore	James Madison
Diego Pounds	61	OL	6'5"	330	Raleigh, NC	Sophomore	Ole Miss

==== NFL draft entries ====
The following Tar Heel players announced plans to enter the 2024 NFL draft and forgo any remaining collegiate eligibility.

Name	No.	Pos.	Height	Weight	Hometown	Year
Amari Gainer	3	LB	6'3"	235	Tallahassee, FL	Graduate
Corey Gaynor	65	OL	6'3"	305	Parkland, FL	Graduate
Cedric Gray	33	LB	6'2"	235	Charlotte, NC	Senior
Drake Maye	10	QB	6'4"	230	Huntersville, NC	Sophomore
Myles Murphy	8	DL	6'4"	310	Greensboro, NC	Senior
Spencer Rolland	75	OL	6'6"	315	Burnsville, MN	Graduate
Tez Walker	9	WR	6'2"	200	Charlotte, NC	Junior

=== Coaching Changes ===
Following continued defensive struggles under DC Gene Chizik in the 2023 season, both he and defensive line coach Tim Cross were dismissed after the team's bowl game. Senior Defensive Analyst Ted Monachino was elevated to the defensive line coaching position the same day Cross and Chizik's departures were announced.

Former Georgia Tech head coach Geoff Collins was hired to replace Chizik as defensive coordinator for the 2024 season.

Senior advisor Darrell Moody retired after the season, and was replaced by former Tar Heel and NFL linebacker Brian Simmons in a similar advisory role to head coach Mack Brown. Brown's other senior advisor, Sparky Woods also left the staff in late January.
