= 2023 West Virginia Mountaineers football team =

American college football season

2023 West Virginia Mountaineers football

Duke’s Mayo Bowl champion

Duke's Mayo Bowl, W 30–10 vs. North Carolina
- Conference: Big 12 Conference

Ranking
- Coaches: No. 25
- Record: 9–4 (6–3 Big 12)
- Head coach: Neal Brown (5th season)
- Offensive coordinator: Chad Scott (1st season)
- Offensive scheme: Spread option
- Defensive coordinator: Jordan Lesley (4th season)
- Co-defensive coordinator: ShaDon Brown (3rd season)
- Base defense: Multiple
- Home stadium: Milan Puskar Stadium

2023 Big 12 Conference football standings
	Conf.			Overall
Team	W		L	W		L
No. 3 Texas y$^	8	–	1	12	–	2
No. 16 Oklahoma State y	7	–	2	10	–	4
No. 15 Oklahoma	7	–	2	10	–	3
Iowa State	6	–	3	7	–	6
No. 18 Kansas State	6	–	3	9	–	4
West Virginia	6	–	3	9	–	4
Texas Tech	5	–	4	7	–	6
No. 23 Kansas	5	–	4	9	–	4
UCF	3	–	6	6	–	7
TCU	3	–	6	5	–	7
Houston	2	–	7	4	–	8
BYU	2	–	7	5	–	7
Baylor	2	–	7	3	–	9
Cincinnati	1	–	8	3	–	9
Championship: Texas 49, Oklahoma State 21
^ – College Football Playoff participant; $ – Conference champion; y – Championship game participant; Rankings from AP Poll

The 2023 West Virginia Mountaineers football team represented West Virginia University as a member of the Big 12 Conference during the 2023 NCAA Division I FBS football season. The Mountaineers were led by fifth-year head coach Neal Brown and played their home games at Milan Puskar Stadium in Morgantown, West Virginia.

== Offseason ==
=== Transfers ===
==== Outgoing ====
Player	Position	Destination
Mumu Bin-Wahad	CB	UConn
Charles Woods	CB	SMU
Mike O'Laughlin	TE	Houston
Naim Muhammad	CB	Kent State
Reese Smith	WR	Liberty
Will Crowder	QB	Troy
Saint McLeod	S	Unknown
Corbin Page	TE	Unknown
Tyrin Woodby	CB	Unknown
JT Daniels	QB	Rice
Jordan White	IOL	Liberty
Kaden Prather	WR	Maryland
Taurus Simmons	EDGE	Withdrawn
Jordan Jefferson	DL	LSU
Chris Mayo	IOL	Eastern Michigan
Taijh Alston	EDGE	Colorado
Lanell Carr	LB	Indiana
Jaylon Shelton	CB	Texas State
Dylan Ray	IOL	Kentucky
Aric Burton	DE	Unknown
Caleb Coleman	CB	Texas State
Tony Mathis	RB	Houston

==== Incoming ====
Player	Position	Previous school
Noah Massey	WR	Angelo State
Tyrin Bradley	DL	Abilene Christian
EJ Horton	WR	Marshall
Tomiwa Durojaiye	DL	Kentucky
Anthony Wilson	S	Georgia Southern
Beanie Bishop	CB	Minnesota
Davoan Hawkins	DL	Tennessee State
Fatorma Mulbah	DL	Penn State
Michael Hayes	K	Georgia State
Keyshawn Cobb	S	Buffalo
Ja'Shaun Poke	WR	Kent State
Devin Carter	WR	NC State
Kole Taylor	TE	LSU
Montre Miller	CB	Kent State
Ak'Bar Shabazz II	CB	Pittsburgh

== Schedule ==
Date	Time	Opponent	Site	TV	Result	Attendance
September 2	7:30 p.m.	at No. 7 Penn State*	Beaver Stadium; University Park, PA (rivalry)	NBC	L 15–38	110,747
September 9	6:00 p.m.	Duquesne*	Milan Puskar Stadium; Morgantown, WV	ESPN+	W 56–17	50,037
September 16	7:30 p.m.	Pittsburgh*	Milan Puskar Stadium; Morgantown, WV (Backyard Brawl, Stripe the Stadium)	ABC	W 17–6	61,106
September 23	3:30 p.m.	Texas Tech	Milan Puskar Stadium; Morgantown, WV (Gold Rush)	ESPN+	W 20–13	50,071
September 30	8:00 p.m.	at TCU	Amon G. Carter Stadium; Fort Worth, TX	ESPN2	W 24–21	43,736
October 12	7:00 p.m.	at Houston	TDECU Stadium; Houston, TX	FS1	L 39–41	32,152
October 21	3:30 p.m.	Oklahoma State^{†}	Milan Puskar Stadium; Morgantown, WV	ESPN	L 34–48	51,870
October 28	12:00 p.m.	at UCF	FBC Mortgage Stadium; Orlando, FL	FS1 (Note: Partially aired on FOX as a look-in due to lightning delayed OU-Kansas game)	W 41–28	44,136
November 4	7:00 p.m.	BYU	Milan Puskar Stadium; Morgantown, WV (True Blue)	FOX	W 37–7	50,266
November 11	7:00 p.m.	at No. 17 Oklahoma	Gaylord Family Oklahoma Memorial Stadium; Norman, OK	FOX	L 20–59	83,525
November 18	2:30 p.m.	Cincinnati	Milan Puskar Stadium; Morgantown, WV (rivalry)	ESPN+	W 42–21	43,588
November 25	7:00 p.m.	at Baylor	McLane Stadium; Waco, TX	FS1	W 34–31	36,200
December 27	5:30 p.m.	vs. North Carolina*	Bank of America Stadium; Charlotte, NC (Duke's Mayo Bowl)	ESPN	W 30–10	42,925
*Non-conference game; ^{†}Homecoming; Rankings from AP Poll (and CFP Rankings, after November 1) - Released prior to game; All times are in Eastern time

== Game summaries ==
=== At No. 7 Penn State ===
West Virginia Mountaineers at No. 7 Penn State Nittany Lions – Game summary

Quarter	1	2	3	4	Total
Mountaineers	0	7	0	8	15
No. 7 Nittany Lions	7	7	7	17	38

at Beaver Stadium, University Park, Pennsylvania

- Date: September 2
- Game time: 7:30 p.m. EDT
- Game weather: 77 °F (25 °C), mostly sunny
- Game attendance: 110,747
- Referee: Mark Kluczynski
- TV announcers (NBC): Noah Eagle, Todd Blackledge, and Kathryn Tappen
- ESPN box score

Game information

First quarter

- PSU – KeAndre Lambert-Smith, 72-yard TD pass from Drew Allar, Sander Sahaydak kick, 10:13 (PSU 7–0)

Second quarter

- WVU – CJ Donaldson Jr., 1-yard TD run, Michael Hayes kick, 14:14 (TIE 7–7)
- PSU – Nicholas Singleton, 2-yard TD run, Sahaydak kick, 9:10 (PSU 14–7)

Third quarter

- PSU – Lambert-Smith, 12-yard TD pass from Allar, Alex Felkins kick, 8:36 (PSU 21–7)

Fourth quarter

- PSU – Felkins, 25-yard field goal, 14:47 (PSU 24–7)
- PSU – Malik McClain, 25-yard TD pass from Allar, Felkins kick, 7:32 (PSU 31–7)
- WVU – Garrett Greene, 1-yard TD run, Donaldson pass from Greene for 2-point conversion, 3:34 (PSU 31–15)
- PSU – Beau Pribula, 5-yard TD run, Felkins kick, 0:06 (PSU 38–15)

Statistics

Statistics	WVU	PSU
First downs	17	27
Plays–yards	67–308	65–478
Rushes–yards	40–146	35–146
Passing yards	162	332
Passing: comp–att–int	16–27–0	22–30–0
Turnovers		
Time of possession	31:16	28:44

Team	Category	Player	Statistics
West Virginia	Passing	Garrett Greene	16/27, 162 yards
West Virginia	Rushing	CJ Donaldson Jr.	18 carries, 81 yards, TD
West Virginia	Receiving	Devin Carter	6 receptions, 90 yards
Penn State	Passing	Drew Allar	21/29, 325 yards, 3 TD
Penn State	Rushing	Nicholas Singleton	13 carries, 70 yards, TD
Penn State	Receiving	KeAndre Lambert-Smith	4 receptions, 123 yards, 2 TD

=== Duquesne ===
West Virginia Mountaineers (0-1) vs. Duquesne Dukes (1-0) - Game Summary

Quarter	1	2	3	4	Total
Dukes	7	3	7	0	17
Mountaineers	7	28	7	14	56

at Milan Puskar Stadium • Morgantown, WV

- Date: Saturday, September 9, 2023
- Game time: 6:00 p.m. EST
- Game weather: • Rainy Temperature: 75
- Game attendance: 50,037
- Referee: Henry Johns
- TV announcers (ESPN+): Noah Reed (play-by-play) & Jay Sonnhalter (analyst)
- ESPN box score

Game information

First quarter

- (12:01) DUQ – Darryl Powell 38 yard pass from Darius Perrantes, Brian Bruzdewicz kick (Drive: 4 plays, 46 yards, 02:04; DUQ 7–0)
- (8:27) WVU – Hudson Clement 14 yard pass from Garrett Greene, Michael Hayes kick (Drive: 8 plays, 46 yards, 03:22; TIE 7-7)

Second quarter

- (14:40) WVU – Jaylen Anderson 8 yard run, Michael Hayes kick (Drive: 9 plays, 94 yards, 03:01; WVU 14–7)
- (8:14) DUQ – Brian Bruzdewicz 39 yard field goal (Drive: 9 plays, 38 yards, 03:24; WVU 14–10)
- (6:49) WVU – Hudson Clement 70 yard pass from Garrett Greene, Michael Hayes kick (Drive: 3 plays, 75 yards, 1:25; WVU 21–10)
- (3:57) WVU – Hudson Clement 46 yard pass from Garrett Greene, Michael Hayes kick (Drive: 3 plays, 57 yards, 1:14; WVU 28-10)
- (0:39) WVU - Preston Fox 22 yard pass from Garrett Greene, Michael Hayes kick (Drive: 7 plays, 63 yards, 2:11; WVU 35-10)

Third quarter

- (4:40) WVU - Jahiem White 19 yard run, Michael Hayes kick (Drive: 7 plays, 67 yards, 3:00; WVU 42-10)
- (1:02) DUQ - Tedy Afful 16 yard pass from Darius Perrantes, Brian Bruzdewicz kick (Drive: 7 plays, 75 yards, 3:38; WVU 42-17)

Fourth quarter

- (9:50) WVU - Nicco Marchiol 1 yard run, Danny King kick (Drive: 6 plays, 20 yards, 2:53; WVU 49-17)
- (2:08) WVU - DJ Oliver 5 yard run, Danny King kick (Drive: 12 plays, 67 yards, 5:33; WVU 56-17)

Statistics	DUQ	WVU
First downs	10	30
Total yards	234	619
Rushes/yards	28/3	49/304
Passing yards	231	315
Passing: Comp–Att–Int	15-32-2	17-32-0
Time of possession	28:21	31:39

Team	Category	Player	Statistics
Duquesne	Passing	Darius Perrantes	14/31, 220 yards, 2 TD, 2 INT
Duquesne	Rushing	Taj Butts	10 carries, 23 yards
Duquesne	Receiving	Tedy Afful	4 receptions, 83 yards, 1 TD
West Virginia	Passing	Garrett Greene	10/18, 240 yards, 4 TD
West Virginia	Rushing	Jahiem White	12 carries, 115 yards, 1 TD
West Virginia	Receiving	Hudson Clement	5 receptions, 117 yards, 3 TD

=== Pittsburgh ===
Pittsburgh Panthers at West Virginia Mountaineers – Game summary

Quarter	1	2	3	4	Total
Panthers	3	3	0	0	6
Mountaineers	0	7	10	0	17

at Milan Puskar Stadium, Morgantown, WV

- Date: September 19
- Game time: 7:30 p.m. EDT
- Game weather: 66 °F (19 °C), clear
- Game attendance: 61,106
- Referee: Jeff Heaser
- TV announcers (ABC): Sean McDonough (play by play), Greg McIlroy (analyst), and Molly McGrath (sideline)
- ESPN box score

Game information

First quarter

- (7:39) PITT - Ben Sauls 21 yard field goal (Drive: 11 plays, 67 yards, 6:41; PITT 3-0)

Second quarter

- (4:45) WVU - Kole Taylor 7 yard pass from Nicco Marchiol, Michael Hayes kick (Drive: 1 play, 7 yards, 0:05; WVU 7-3)
- (0:09) PITT - Ben Sauls 36 yard field goal (Drive: 12 plays, 57 yards, 4:36; WVU 7-6)

Third quarter

- (5:05) WVU - CJ Donaldson 1 yard run, Michael Hayes kick (Drive: 13 plays, 61 yards, 7:48; WVU 14-6)
- (1:57) WVU - Michael Hayes 42 yard field goal (Drive: 4 plays, 6 yards, 2:06; WVU 17-6)

Statistics

Statistics	PITT	WVU
First downs	12	14
Plays–yards	56–211	62–211
Rushes–yards	36–130	51–151
Passing yards	81	60
Passing: comp–att–int	8–20–3	6–11–0
Turnovers		
Time of possession	26:47	33:13

Team	Category	Player	Statistics
Pittsburgh	Passing	Phil Jurkovec	8/20, 81 yards
Pittsburgh	Rushing	Rodney Hammond	14 carries, 54 yards
Pittsburgh	Receiving	Gavin Bartholomew	2 receptions, 39 yards
West Virginia	Passing	Nicco Marchiol	6/9, 60 yards, 1 TD
West Virginia	Rushing	CJ Donaldson	18 carries, 102 yards, 1 TD
West Virginia	Receiving	Kole Taylor	3 receptions, 21 yards, 1 TD

=== Texas Tech ===
Texas Tech Red Raiders at West Virginia Mountaineers – Game summary

Quarter	1	2	3	4	Total
Red Raiders	3	0	0	10	13
Mountaineers	7	6	0	7	20

at Milan Puskar Stadium, Morgantown, West Virginia

- Date: September 23
- Game time: 2:30 p.m. CDT/3:30 p.m. EDT
- Game weather: Cloudy, 56 °F (13 °C), N 12 miles per hour (19 km/h)
- Game attendance: 50,071
- Referee: Kevin Boitmann
- TV announcers (ESPN+): Drew Carter, Dustin Fox, and Tori Petry

Game information
First quarter
- TTU – Gino Garcia 39-yard field goal, 8:40. Red Raiders 3–0. Drive: 6 plays, 14 yards, 1:54.
- WVU – CJ Donaldson Jr. 2-yard run (Michael Hayes kick), 1:53. Mountaineers 7–3. Drive: 13 plays, 75 yards, 6:47.

Second quarter

- WVU – Michael Hayes 28-yard field goal, 6:34. Mountaineers 10–3. Drive: 12 plays, 56 yards, 6:08.
- WVU – Michael Hayes 46-yard field goal, 0:25. Mountaineers 13–3. Drive: 6 plays, 26 yards, 2:58.

Third quarter

- No scoring plays

Fourth quarter

- TTU – Jerand Bradley 6-yard pass from Behren Morton (Gino Garcia kick), 11:54. Mountaineers 13–10. Drive: 13 plays, 79 yards, 4:42.
- WVU – Kole Taylor 9-yard pass from Nicco Marchiol (Michael Hayes kick), 7:33. Mountaineers 20–10. Drive: 7 plays, 79 yards, 4:16.
- TTU – Gino Garcia 34-yard field goal, 4:45. Mountaineers 20–13. Drive: 14 plays, 59 yards, 2:40.

Statistics

Statistics	TTU	WVU
First downs	18	16
Total yards	321	256
Rushes/yards	38/160	42/157
Passing yards	161	99
Passing: Comp–Att–Int	15-43-0	13-22-2
Time of possession	25:10	34:50

Team	Category	Player	Statistics
Texas Tech	Passing	Behren Morton	13/37, 158 yards, TD
Texas Tech	Rushing	Tahj Brooks	25 carries, 149 yards
Texas Tech	Receiving	Xavier White	3 receptions, 45 yards
West Virginia	Passing	Nicco Marchiol	12/21, 78 yards, TD, 2 INT
West Virginia	Rushing	Nicco Marchiol	15 carries, 72 yards
West Virginia	Receiving	Kole Taylor	3 receptions, 39 yards, TD

=== At TCU ===
West Virginia Mountaineers at TCU Horned Frogs – Game summary

Quarter	1	2	3	4	Total
Mountaineers	7	7	7	3	24
Horned Frogs	7	14	0	0	21

at Amon G. Carter Stadium, Fort Worth, Texas

- Date: September 30
- Game time: 7:00 p.m. CDT/8:00 p.m. EDT
- Game weather: Clear, 90 °F (32 °C), S 11 miles per hour, (19 km/h)
- Game attendance: 43,736
- Referee: Derek Anderson
- TV announcers (ESPN2): Dave Fleming, Brock Osweiler, Kayla Burton

Game information
First quarter
- (12:15) TCU - JP Richardson 59 yard pass from Chandler Morris, Griffin Kell kick (Drive: 4 plays, 70 yards, 0:51, TCU 7-0)
- (8:53) WVU - Garrett Greene 35 yard, Michael Hayes kick, (Drive: 6 plays, 75 yards, 3:22, TIE 7-7)

Second quarter

- (14:51) TCU - Chandler Morris 31 yard run, Griffin Kell kick (Drive: 8 plays, 81 yards, 2:44, TCU 14-7)
- (1:50) WVU - CJ Donaldson 1 yard run, Michael Hayes kick (Drive: 10 plays, 43 yards, 5:05, TIE 14-14)
- (0:24) TCU - Dylan Wright 36 yard pass from Chandler Morris, Griffin Kell kick (Drive: 9 plays 75 yards, 1:26, TCU 21-14)

Third quarter

- (4:29) WVU - Garrett Greene 1 yard run, Michael Hayes kick (Drive: 8 plays, 44 yards, 4:54, TIE 21-21)

Fourth quarter

- (9:21) WVU - Michael Hayes 49 yard field goal (Drive: 5 plays, 16 yards, 2:49, WVU 24-21)

Statistics

Statistics	WVU	TCU
First downs	20	23
Total yards	343	433
Rushes/yards	43/201	38/135
Passing yards	142	298
Passing: Comp–Att–Int	10-21-0	23-41-0
Time of possession	33:27	26:33

Team	Category	Player	Statistics
West Virginia	Passing	Garrett Greene	10/21, 142 yards
West Virginia	Rushing	Garrett Greene	12 carries, 80 yards
West Virginia	Receiving	Hudson Clement	3 receptions, 43 yards
TCU	Passing	Chandler Morris	23/41, 298 yards, 2 TD
TCU	Rushing	Emani Bailey	19 carries, 55 yards
TCU	Receiving	JP Richardson	3 receptions, 87 yards, 1 TD

=== At Houston ===
West Virginia Mountaineers at Houston Cougars– Game summary

Quarter	1	2	3	4	Total
Mountaineers	10	0	7	22	39
Cougars	7	7	7	20	41

at TDECU Stadium, Houston, TX

- Date: October 12
- Game time: 7:00 p.m.
- Game weather: Cloudy, 79 °F (26 °C), SE 15 miles per hour (24 km/h)
- Game attendance: 32,152
- Referee: Stephen Baron
- TV announcers (FS1): Tim Brando, Spencer Tillman
- Gamecast

Game information

First Quarter

- (4:16) WVU - Michael Hayes 27 yard field goal (Drive: 16 plays, 82 yards, 7:51, WVU 3-0)
- (4:03) HOU - Matthew Golden 100 yard kickoff return, Jack Martin kick (HOU 7-3)
- (0:13) WVU - CJ Donaldson 5 yard run, Michael Hayes kick (Drive: 8 plays 69 yards, 3:05, WVU 10-7)

Second Quarter

- (0:28) HOU - Donovan Smith 2 yard run, Jack Martin kick (Drive: 8 plays, 56 yards, 1:26, HOU 14-10)

Third Quarter

- (13:06) WVU - Traylon Ray 35 yard pass from Garrett Greene, Michael Hayes kick (Drive: 4 plays, 56 yards, 1:47, WVU 17-14)
- (5:15) HOU - Joseph Manjack IV 15 yard pass from Donovan Smith, Jack Martin kick (Drive: 4 plays, 80 yards, 2:32, HOU 21-17)

Fourth Quarter

- (14:16) WVU - Garrett Greene 1 yard run, Michael Hayes kick (Drive: 11 plays, 78 yards, 2:32, WVU 24-21)
- (12:02) HOU - Samuel Brown 8 yard pass from Donovan Smith, Jack Martin kick (Drive: 4 plays, 66 yards, 2:06, HOU 28-24)
- (7:28) HOU - Stephon Johnson Jr 21 yard pass from Donovan Smith, Jack Martin kick (Drive: 6 plays, 59 yards, 3:24, HOU 35-24)
- (3:42) WVU - Garrett Greene 8 yard run, Traylon Ray pass 2 point conversion (Drive: 11 plays, 75 yards, 3:46, HOU 35-32)
- (00:12) WVU - Hudson Clement 50 yard pass from Garrett Greene, Michael Hayes kick (Drive: 7 plays, 88 yards, 1:05, WVU 39-35)
- (00:00) HOU - Stephon Johnson Jr. 49 yard pass from Donovan Smith (Drive: 2 plays, 57 yards, 0:07, HOU 41-39)

Statistics	WVU	Houston
First downs	26	20
Total yards	546	393
Rushes/yards	44/155	26/140
Passing yards	391	253
Passing Comp-Att-Int	20-38-1	21-27-0
Time of possession	36:59	23:01

Team	Category	Player	Statistics
West Virginia	Passing	Garrett Greene	20-38, 391 yards, 2 TD, 1 INT
West Virginia	Rushing	CJ Donaldson	17 carries, 66 yards, 1 TD
West Virginia	Receiving	Devin Carter	5 receptions, 116 yards
Houston	Passing	Donovan Smith	21–27, 253 yards, 4 TD
Houston	Rushing	Stacy Sneed	7 carries, 78 yards
Houston	Receiving	Stephon Johnson	4 receptions, 98 yards, 2 TD

=== Oklahoma State ===
Oklahoma State Cowboys at West Virginia Mountaineers – Game summary

Quarter	1	2	3	4	Total
Cowboys	10	3	7	28	48
Mountaineers	0	7	17	10	34

at Milan Puskar Stadium, Morgantown, West Virginia

- Date: October 21
- Game time: 2:30 pm CDT
- Game weather: Cloudy Temperature: 55
- Game attendance: 51,870
- Referee: David Alvarez
- TV announcers (ESPN): Mike Monaco (play-by-play) & Robert Griffin III (analyst)
- ESPN box score

Game information

First quarter
Second quarter
Third quarter
Fourth quarter

Statistics	OKST	WVU
First downs	21	24
Total yards	491	475
Rushes/yards	33/281	44/226
Passing yards	210	249
Passing: Comp–Att–Int	24-36-1	15-30-1
Time of possession	27:24	32:36

Team	Category	Player	Statistics
Oklahoma State	Passing	Alan Bowman	24/36, 210 yards, 2 TD, 1 INT
Oklahoma State	Rushing	Ollie Gordon	29 carries, 282 yards, 4 TD
Oklahoma State	Receiving	Brennan Presley	9 receptions, 62 yards, 1 TD
West Virginia	Passing	Garrett Greene	15/30, 249 yards, 2 TD, 1 INT
West Virginia	Rushing	Garrett Greene	16 carries, 126 yards
West Virginia	Receiving	Preston Fox	4 receptions, 81 yards

=== At UCF ===
West Virginia Mountaineers at UCF Knights – Game summary

Quarter	1	2	3	4	Total
Mountaineers	10	7	7	17	41
Knights	7	7	7	7	28

at FBC Mortgage Stadium, Orlando, FL

- Date: October 28
- Game time: 12:00 p.m.
- Game attendance: 44,136
- TV announcers (FS1): Eric Collins, Devin Gardner
- Gamecast

Game information

First Quarter

- WVU: Garrett Greene 6-yard touchdown run (Michael Hayes kick), 10:57
- UCF: Kobe Hudson 34-yard touchdown pass from John Rhys Plumlee (Colton Boomer kick), 7:06
- WVU: Michael Hayes 24-yard field goal, 2:01

Second Quarter

- WVU: Jahiem White 4-yard touchdown run (Michael Hayes kick), 10:02
- UCF: John Rhys Plumlee 8-yard touchdown run (Colton Boomer kick), 5:50

Third Quarter

- WVU: Garrett Greene 7-yard touchdown run (Michael Hayes kick), 9:01
- UCF: Javon Baker 7-yard touchdown from John Rhys Plumlee (Colton Boomer kick), 5:25

Fourth Quarter

- WVU: Garrett Greene 1-yard touchdown run (Michael Hayes kick), 14:12
- WVU: C.J. Donaldson 1-yard touchdown run (Michael Hayes kick), 9:25
- WVU: Michael Hayes 41-yard field goal, 5:15
- UCF: Kobe Hudson 16-yard touchdown pass from John Rhys Plumlee (Colton Boomer kick), 1:46

Win Probability

- UCF 70.7%

Line

- UCF -7

Over/Under

- 57.5

Statistics	WVU	UCF
First downs	25	27
Total yards	450	463
Rushing yards	286	189
Passing yards	164	274
Turnovers	1	4
Time of possession	36:06	23:54

Team	Category	Player	Statistics
West Virginia	Passing	Garrett Greene	14-23, 156 yards
West Virginia	Rushing	C.J. Donaldson	17 carries, 121 yards, 1 TD
West Virginia	Receiving	Devin Carter	3 receptions, 47 yards
UCF	Passing	John Rhys Plumlee	25–36, 274 yards, 3 TD, 3 INT
UCF	Rushing	R. J. Harvey	14 carries, 100 yards
UCF	Receiving	Kobe Hudson	3 receptions, 66 yards, 2 TD

=== BYU ===
BYU Cougars (5–3) vs. West Virginia Mountaineers (5–3)

Quarter	1	2	3	4	Total
BYU	0	0	0	7	7
West Virginia	14	13	10	0	37

at Milan Puskar Stadium • Morgantown, WV

- Date: Saturday, November 4, 2023
- Game time: 7:00 p.m. EST
- Game weather: Clear • Temperature: 59 °F (15 °C) • Wind: SW 8 miles per hour (13 km/h)
- Game attendance: 50,266
- Referee: Kevin Boitmann
- TV: FOX
- ESPN box score

Game information

First quarter

- (9:59) WVU – CJ Donaldson 2 yard run, Michael Hayes kick (Drive: 11 plays, 75 yards, 5:01; WVU 7–0)
- (6:17) WVU – CJ Donaldson 1 yard run, Michael Hayes kick (Drive: 5 plays, 52 yards, 1:50; WVU 14–0)

Second quarter

- (10:47) WVU – Michael Hayes 46-yard field goal (Drive: 6 plays, 37 yards, 3:03; WVU 17–0)
- (2:18) WVU – Preston Fox 12-yard pass from Garrett Greene, Michael Hayes kick (Drive: 10 plays, 93 yards, 5:35; WVU 24–0)
- (0:00) WVU – Michael Hayes 22-yard field goal (Drive: 9 plays, 78 yards, 1:05; WVU 27–0)

Third quarter

- (10:35) WVU – Michael Hayes 23-yard field goal (Drive: 8 plays, 53 yards, 2:44; WVU 30–0)
- (1:09) WVU – Kole Taylor 43-yard pass from Garrett Greene, Michael Hayes kick (Drive: 7 plays, 85 yards, 4:14; WVU 37–0)

Fourth quarter

- (6:24) BYU – Aidan Robbins 10-yard run, Will Ferrin kick (Drive: 8 plays, 62 yards, 2:57; WVU 37–7)

Statistics	BYU	WVU
First downs	20	30
Total yards	277	567
Rushes/yards	21/67	48/336
Passing yards	210	231
Passing: Comp–Att–Int	24–42–0	16–28–0
Time of possession	24:33	35:27

Team	Category	Player	Statistics
BYU	Passing	Jake Retzlaff	24/42, 210 yards
BYU	Rushing	Aidan Robbins	10 carries, 37 yards, 1 TD
BYU	Receiving	Parker Kingston	6 receptions, 57 yards
West Virginia	Passing	Garrett Greene	12/24, 205 yards, 2 TD
West Virginia	Rushing	Jahiem White	16 carries, 146 yards
West Virginia	Receiving	Devin Carter	3 receptions, 56 yards

=== At No. 17 Oklahoma ===
West Virginia Mountaineers (6–3) vs. No. 17 Oklahoma Sooners (7–2)

Quarter	1	2	3	4	Total
West Virginia	7	7	6	0	20
No. 17 Oklahoma	14	17	14	14	59

at Gaylord Family Oklahoma Memorial Stadium • Norman, OK

- Date: Saturday, November 11, 2023
- Game time: 6:00 p.m. CST
- Game weather: • Sunny Temperature: 55
- Game attendance: 83,525
- Referee: Kevin Mar
- TV announcers (FOX): Jeff Levering (play-by-play) & Mark Helfrich (analyst)
- ESPN box score

Game information

First quarter

- (11:00) WVU – CJ Donaldson 13 yard rush, Michael Hayes kick (Drive: 8 plays, 75 yards, 4:00; WVU 7–0)
- (8:27) OKLA – Dillon Gabriel 2 yard rush, Zach Schmit kick (Drive: 8 plays, 75 yards, 2:33; Tied 7–7)
- (3:16) OKLA – Dillon Gabriel 2 yard rush, Zach Schmit kick (Drive: 11 plays, 65 yards, 3:26; OKLA 14–7)

Second quarter

- (13:58) OKLA – Zach Schmit 23 yard field goal (Drive: 6 plays, 65 yards, 1:20; OKLA 17–7)
- (9:06) OKLA – Austin Stogner 3 yard pass from Dillon Gabriel, Zach Schmit kick (Drive: 9 plays, 46 yards, 2:57; OKLA 24–7)
- (6:20) OKLA – Jaden Gibson 32 yard pass from Dillon Gabriel, Zach Schmit kick (Drive: 5 plays, 86 yards, 1:49; OKLA 31–7)
- (0:07) WVU – Kole Taylor 3 yard pass from Garrett Greene, Michael Hayes kick (Drive: 6 plays, 75 yards, 0:53; OKLA 31–14)

Third quarter

- (13:48) OKLA – Drake Stoops 60 yard pass from Dillon Gabriel, Zach Schmit kick (Drive: 4 plays, 75 yards, 1:12; OKLA 38–14)
- (9:28) WVU – Devin Carter 7 yard pass from Garrett Green, Garrett Greene 2 pt conversion failed (Drive: 12 plays, 61 yards, 4:14; OKLA 38–20)
- (4:34) OKLA – Drake Stoops 9 yard pass from Dillon Gabriel, Zach Schmit kick (Drive: 6 plays, 43 yards, 1:53; OKLA 45–20)

Fourth quarter

- (13:46) OKLA – Drake Stoops 9 yard pass from Dillon Gabriel, Zach Schmit kick (Drive: 7 plays, 81 yards, 3:20; OKLA 52–20)
- (7:59) OKLA – Dillon Gabriel 5 yard rush, Zach Schmit kick (Drive: 10 plays, 65 yards, 4:37; OKLA 59–20)

Statistics	WVU	OKLA
First downs	17	25
Total yards	330	664
Rushes/yards	41/176	42/221
Passing yards	154	423
Passing: Comp–Att–Int	10–31–2	23–36
Time of possession	30:32	29:28

Team	Category	Player	Statistics
West Virginia	Passing	Garrett Greene	10/27, 154 yards, 2 TD, 1 INT
West Virginia	Rushing	CJ Donaldson	14 carries, 79 yards, 1 TD
West Virginia	Receiving	Devin Carter	3 receptions, 67 yards, 1 TD
Oklahoma	Passing	Dillon Gabriel	23/36, 423 yards, 5 TD
Oklahoma	Rushing	Gavin Sawchuk	22 carries, 135 yards
Oklahoma	Receiving	Drake Stoops	10 receptions, 164 yards, 3 TD

=== Cincinnati ===
Game Eleven – Cincinnati Bearcats at West Virginia Mountaineers

Quarter	1	2	3	4	Total
Bearcats	0	7	0	14	21
Mountaineers	7	21	14	0	42

at Milan Puskar Stadium • Morgantown, West Virginia

- Date: Saturday, November 18, 2023
- Game time: 2:30 p.m. EDT
- Game weather: Sunny • Temperature: 48 °F (9 °C) • Wind:
- Game attendance: 43,588
- Referee: Michael VanderVelde
- TV announcers (ESPN+): Jorge Sedano (play-by-play) & Orlando Franklin (analyst)
- ESPN box score

Game information

First quarter
Second quarter
Third quarter
Fourth quarter

Statistics	CIN	WVU
First downs	18	31
Plays–yards	332/58	634/65
Rushes–yards	141/31	424/46
Passing yards	191	210
Passing: comp–att–int	16-27-0	12-9-1
Turnovers		
Time of possession	25:11	34:49

Team	Category	Player	Statistics
Cincinnati	Passing	Emory Jones	14/24, 166 yards, 2 TD
Cincinnati	Rushing	Corey Kiner	13 carries, 56 yards
Cincinnati	Receiving	Xzavier Henderson	6 receptions, 104 yards
West Virginia	Passing	Garrett Greene	12/19, 210 yards, 1 TD, 1 INT
West Virginia	Rushing	Jahiem White	21 carries, 204 yards, 1 TD
West Virginia	Receiving	Jahiem White	1 reception, 75 yards, 1 TD

=== At Baylor ===
West Virginia Mountaineers (7–4) vs. Baylor Bears (3–8)

Quarter	1	2	3	4	Total
West Virginia	7	20	0	7	34
Baylor	0	14	14	3	31

at McLane Stadium • Waco, TX

- Date: Saturday, November 25, 2023
- Game time: 6:00 p.m. CST
- Game weather: • Rain, 56 °F (13 °C), SE 2 miles per hour (3 km/h)
- Game attendance: 36,200
- Referee: Tutashinda Salaam
- TV announcers (FS1): Alex Faust, Petros Papadakis
- ESPN box score

Game information

First quarter

- (5:55) WVU - Traylon Ray 30 yard pass from Garrett Greene, Michael Hayes kick (Drive: 3 plays, 90 yards, 1:24, WVU 7-0)

Second quarter

- (14:10) WVU - Michael Hayes 38 yard field goal (Drive: 9 plays, 64 yards, 4:24, WVU 10-0)
- (13:55) BAY - Richard Reese 96 yard kickoff return, Isaiah Hankins kick (WVU 10-7)
- (10:28) WVU - Garrett Greene 23 yard run, Michael Hayes kick (Drive: 7 plays, 82 yards, 3:27, WVU 17-7)
- (10:16) BAY - Richard Reese 93 yard kickoff return, Isaiah Hankins kick (WVU 17-14)
- (5:44) WVU - Michael Hayes 36 yard field goal (Drive: 8 plays, 60 yards, 4:32, WVU 20-14)
- (0:15) WVU - Garrett Greene 1 yard run, Michael Hayes kick (Drive: 7 plays, 74 yards, 1:31, WVU 27-14)

Third quarter

- (10:57) BAY - Ketron Jackson Jr. 38 yard pass from Sawyer Robertson, Isaiah Hankins kick (Drive: 7 plays, 77 yards, 4:03, WVU 27-21)
- (5:45) BAY - Dominic Richardson 2 yard run, Isaiah Hankins kick (Drive: 6 plays, 51 yards, 2:50, BAY 28-27)

Fourth quarter

- (12:58) BAY - Isaiah Hankins 39 yard field goal (Drive: 12 plays, 63 yards, 5:49, BAY 31-27)
- (0:23) WVU - Jaheim White 29 yard pass from Garrett Greene, Michael Hayes kick (Drive: 6 plays, 80 yards, 0:51, WVU 34-31)

Statistics	WVU	BAY
First downs	23	17
Total yards	519	334
Rushes/yards	37/250	37/119
Passing yards	269	215
Passing: Comp–Att–Int	16–25–0	17–20-0
Time of possession	28:55	31:05

Team	Category	Player	Statistics
West Virginia	Passing	Garrett Greene	16/25, 269 yards, 2 TD
West Virginia	Rushing	Jahiem White	17 carries, 133 yards
West Virginia	Receiving	Hudson Clement	4 receptions, 80 yards
Baylor	Passing	Sawyer Robertson	17/19, 215 yards, 1 TD
Baylor	Rushing	Richard Reese	6 carries, 42 yards
Baylor	Receiving	Ketron Jackson Jr.	3 receptions, 88 yards, 1 TD

=== Vs. North Carolina (Duke's Mayo Bowl) ===
Game Thirteen – North Carolina Tar Heels vs West Virginia Mountaineers (Duke's Mayo Bowl)

Quarter	1	2	3	4	Total
Tar Heels	0	10	0	0	10
Mountaineers	7	10	3	10	30

at Bank of America Stadium • Charlotte, North Carolina

- Date: Tuesday, December 27, 2023
- Game time: 5:30 p.m. EST
- Game weather: Cloudy • Temperature: 59 °F (15 °C) • Wind: 3 mph (4.8 km/h) SE
- Game attendance: 42,925
- Referee: Jerry McGinn
- TV announcers (ESPN): Matt Barrie (play-by-play), Dan Mullen (analyst), and Harry Lyles Jr. (sideline)
- Box score

Game information
First quarter
- (14:49) WVU – Traylon Ray 75 yard pass from Garrett Greene, Michael Hayes kick, (Drive: 1 plays, 75 yards, 0:11; West Virginia 7–0)

Second quarter

- (8:34) UNC – Noah Burnette 28 yard field goal, (Drive: 14 plays, 45 yards, 7:13; West Virginia 7–3)
- (1:29) WVU – Beanie Bishop Jr. 78 yard punt return, Michael Hayes kick, (Drive: 4 plays, 2 yards, 2:16; West Virginia 14–3)
- (0:27) UNC – J.J. Jones 16 yard pass from Conner Harrell, Noah Burnette kick, (Drive: 5 plays, 76 yards, 1:02; West Virginia 14–10)
- (0:00) WVU – Michael Hayes 30 yard field goal, (Drive: 6 plays, 63 yards, 0:27; West Virginia 17–10)

Third quarter

- (2:40) WVU – Michael Hayes 34 yard field goal, (Drive: 8 plays, 54 yards, 3:46; West Virginia 20–10)

Fourth quarter

- (12:48) WVU – Jahiem White 11 yard rush, Michael Hayes kick, (Drive: 4 plays, 78 yards, 1:56; West Virginia 27–10)
- (7:58) WVU – Michael Hayes 29 yard field goal, (Drive: 8 plays, 15 yards, 3:27; West Virginia 30–10)

Statistics	UNC	WVU
First downs	20	16
Plays–yards	68–339	54–392
Rushes–yards	41–140	30–164
Passing yards	199	228
Passing: comp–att–int	18–27–3	12–24–1
Turnovers		
Time of possession	34:39	25:21

Team	Category	Player	Statistics
North Carolina	Passing	Conner Harrell	18/27, 199 yards, TD, 2 INT
North Carolina	Rushing	Omarion Hampton	19 carries, 62 yards
North Carolina	Receiving	Gavin Blackwell	3 carries, 78 yards
West Virginia	Passing	Garrett Greene	12/24, 228 yards, TD
West Virginia	Rushing	Garrett Greene	9 carries, 64 yards
West Virginia	Receiving	Traylon Ray	3 carries, 91 yards

== Rankings ==
Ranking movements Legend: ██ Increase in ranking ██ Decrease in ranking — = Not ranked RV = Received votes
	Week															
Poll	Pre	1	2	3	4	5	6	7	8	9	10	11	12	13	14	Final
AP	—	—	—	—	—	RV	RV	RV	—	—	RV	—	—	—	—	RV
Coaches	—	—	—	—	—	RV	RV	RV	—	—	RV	—	RV	RV	RV	25
CFP	Not released									—	—	—	—	—	—	Not released

== Coaching staff ==
Coach	Title	Year at West Virginia	Previous job
Neal Brown	Head coach	5th	Troy
Matt Moore	Assistant head coach/OL	5th	Troy (Co-OC/OL)
Chad Scott	OC/RB	5th	Louisville (RB)
Jordan Lesley	DC/OLB	5th	Troy (DL)
Jeff Koonz	ILB/ST	4th	Ole Miss (ILB)
Andrew Jackson	DL	3rd	Old Dominion (DL)
Sean Reagan	QB	5th	Troy (Co-OC/QB)
Blaine Stewart	TE	1st	Pittsburgh Steelers (Assistant WR)
Bilal Marshall	WR	2nd	VMI (WR)
Dontae Wright	S	4th	Western Michigan (S)
