= 2023 Duke's Mayo Bowl =

Postseason college football bowl game

- 22nd Duke's Mayo Bowl
North Carolina Tar Heels	West Virginia Mountaineers
(8–4)	(8–4)
ACC	Big 12
10	30
Head coach: Mack Brown	Head coach: Neal Brown
	1	2	3	4	Total
North Carolina	0	10	0	0	10
West Virginia	7	10	3	10	30
- Date: December 27, 2023
- Season: 2023
- Stadium: Bank of America Stadium
- Location: Charlotte, North Carolina
- MVP: Garrett Greene (QB, West Virginia)
- Favorite: West Virginia by 3.5
- Referee: Jerry McGinn (Big 10)
- Attendance: 42,925

United States TV coverage
- Network: ESPN; ESPN Radio
- Announcers: Matt Barrie (play-by-play), Dan Mullen (analyst), and Harry Lyles Jr. (sideline) (ESPN); Mike Couzens (play-by-play) and Charles Arbuckle (analyst) (ESPN Radio)

The 2023 Duke's Mayo Bowl was a college football bowl game played on December 27, 2023, at Bank of America Stadium in Charlotte, North Carolina. The 22nd annual Duke's Mayo Bowl featured North Carolina of the Atlantic Coast Conference (ACC) and West Virginia of the Big 12 Conference. The game began at approximately 5:30 p.m. EST and was aired on ESPN. The Duke's Mayo Bowl was one of the 2023–24 bowl games concluding the 2023 FBS football season. The game's title sponsor was Duke's Mayonnaise.

== Teams ==
The 2023 edition of the Duke's Mayo Bowl was the fourth under the Duke's Mayonnaise branding and 22nd overall. Based on conference tie-ins, the game was to feature teams from the Atlantic Coast Conference (ACC) and the Southeastern Conference (SEC). However, West Virginia's selection made it a matchup of teams from the ACC and the Big 12 Conference.

This was the third all-time meeting between the Mountaineers and the Tar Heels; the teams had a 1–1 record in prior games. Both previous matchups also were in bowl games, the 2008 Meineke Car Care Bowl (an earlier naming of the Duke's Mayo Bowl) won by West Virginia, and the 1997 Gator Bowl won by North Carolina.

=== North Carolina ===
After starting the regular season 6–0 and rising as high as 10th in the AP poll, North Carolina went 2–4 in their final six regular season games, finishing the season unranked and with an 8–4 record (4–4 in ACC play). The Tar Heels played two ranked opponents, recording a victory over then-No. 25 Miami and a loss against then-No. 22 NC State at the close of the regular season. Sophomore running back Omarion Hampton ran for 1,442 yards and 15 touchdowns in the regular season, becoming a finalist for the Doak Walker Award.

North Carolina made its 38th bowl game appearance and sixth Duke's Mayo Bowl appearance.

=== West Virginia ===
The 2023 Mountaineers also went 8–4 in the regular season (6–3 in Big 12 play). They finishing tied for fourth in their conference's standings. They played two ranked opponents, losing both games—they lost their season opener to No. 7 Penn State and later lost to No. 17 Oklahoma in conference play.

West Virginia made their 40th bowl appearance and third Duke's Mayo Bowl appearance.

== Game summary ==
2023 Duke's Mayo Bowl

Quarter	1	2	3	4	Total
North Carolina	0	10	0	0	10
West Virginia	7	10	3	10	30

at Bank of America Stadium • Charlotte, North Carolina

- Date: Tuesday, December 27, 2023
- Game time: 5:30 p.m. EST
- Game weather: Cloudy • Temperature: 59 °F (15 °C) • Wind: 3 mph (4.8 km/h) SE
- Game attendance: 42,925
- Referee: Jerry McGinn
- TV announcers (ESPN): Matt Barrie (play-by-play), Dan Mullen (analyst), and Harry Lyles Jr. (sideline)
- Box score

Game information
First quarter
- (14:49) WVU – Traylon Ray 75 yard pass from Garrett Greene, Michael Hayes kick, (Drive: 1 plays, 75 yards, 0:11; West Virginia 7–0)

Second quarter

- (8:34) UNC – Noah Burnette 28 yard field goal, (Drive: 14 plays, 45 yards, 7:13; West Virginia 7–3)
- (1:29) WVU – Beanie Bishop Jr. 78 yard punt return, Michael Hayes kick, (Drive: 4 plays, 2 yards, 2:16; West Virginia 14–3)
- (0:27) UNC – J.J. Jones 16 yard pass from Conner Harrell, Noah Burnette kick, (Drive: 5 plays, 76 yards, 1:02; West Virginia 14–10)
- (0:00) WVU – Michael Hayes 30 yard field goal, (Drive: 6 plays, 63 yards, 0:27; West Virginia 17–10)

Third quarter

- (2:40) WVU – Michael Hayes 34 yard field goal, (Drive: 8 plays, 54 yards, 3:46; West Virginia 20–10)

Fourth quarter

- (12:48) WVU – Jahiem White 11 yard rush, Michael Hayes kick, (Drive: 4 plays, 78 yards, 1:56; West Virginia 27–10)
- (7:58) WVU – Michael Hayes 29 yard field goal, (Drive: 8 plays, 15 yards, 3:27; West Virginia 30–10)

=== Statistics ===
Statistics	UNC	WVU
First downs	20	16
Plays–yards	68–339	54–392
Rushes–yards	41–140	30–164
Passing yards	199	228
Passing: comp–att–int	18–27–3	12–24–1
Turnovers		
Time of possession	34:39	25:21

Team	Category	Player	Statistics
North Carolina	Passing	Conner Harrell	18/27, 199 yards, TD, 2 INT
North Carolina	Rushing	Omarion Hampton	19 carries, 62 yards
North Carolina	Receiving	Gavin Blackwell	3 carries, 78 yards
West Virginia	Passing	Garrett Greene	12/24, 228 yards, TD
West Virginia	Rushing	Garrett Greene	9 carries, 64 yards
West Virginia	Receiving	Traylon Ray	3 carries, 91 yards
