= Conner Harrell =

American football player (born 2004)

No. 15 – Charlotte 49ers
- Position: Quarterback
- Class: Redshirt Senior

Personal information
- Born: September 9, 2004 (age 22); Alabaster, Alabama, U.S.
- Listed height: 6 ft 2 in (1.88 m)
- Listed weight: 210 lb (95 kg)

Career information
- High school: Thompson (Alabaster, Alabama)
- College: North Carolina (2022–2024); Charlotte (2025–present)
- Stats at ESPN

Conner Harrell (born September 9, 2004) is an American college football quarterback for the Charlotte 49ers. He previously played for the North Carolina Tar Heels.

== Early life ==
Harrell was born on September 9, 2004, in Alabaster, Alabama. Harrell attended Thompson High School in Alabaster. Rated a three-star prospect, Harrell committed to play college football at North Carolina.

== College career ==
=== North Carolina ===
==== 2022 ====
Harrell saw limited action and redshirted his true freshman year in 2022.

==== 2023 ====
In 2023, Harrell appeared in five games and made his first collegiate start against West Virginia in the Duke's Mayo Bowl, where the Tar Heels lost 30-10.

==== 2024 ====
With Drake Maye leaving for the NFL, Harrell competed with Max Johnson for the starting quarterback job throughout spring practices and fall training camp. Johnson won the starting job, but suffered a season-ending leg injury in the opening game of the season against Minnesota., Harrell completed two of the four passes he threw in relief of Johnson for 34 yards, as the Tar Heels beat the Golden Gophers 19-17. The following week, Harrell made the second start of his career against Charlotte, completing 16 of 25 passes for 219 yards, two touchdowns, and an interception en route to a 38-20 victory. Harrell made another start the following week against NCCU, but only completed two of the six passes he threw for 22 yards while splitting time with Jacolby Criswell in the game.

The next week, Harrell was benched in favor of Criswell, who started the Tar Heels' 70-50 loss to James Madison. Harrell came in for a play after Criswell's helmet came off, and lost a fumble in his only snap. He did not play in Carolina's loss to rivals Duke the following week, as Criswell solidified his position as Tar Heel quarterback. Harrell's next action came in the loss against Georgia Tech, where he completed one of two passes thrown for seven yards. Harrell next appeared in the Tar Heels' win against FSU, rushing once for sixteen yards in garbage time duty.

Harrell entered into the NCAA transfer portal following the conclusion of the regular season.

=== Charlotte ===
On January 5, 2025, Harrell announced that he would transfer to Charlotte.

=== Statistics ===
Season	Team	Games			Passing								Rushing			
Season	Team	GP	GS	Record	Cmp	Att	Pct	Yds	Y/A	TD	Int	Rtg	Att	Yds	Avg	TD
2022	North Carolina	0	0	—	Redshirted (redshirt)											
2023	North Carolina	5	1	0–1	22	33	66.7	278	8.4	2	2	145.3	21	55	2.6	1
2024	North Carolina	6	2	2–0	21	37	56.8	282	7.6	2	1	133.2	16	55	3.4	1
2025	Charlotte	4	4	1–3	64	96	66.7	737	7.7	4	2	140.7	28	67	2.4	2
Career		15	7	3–4	107	166	64.5	1,297	7.8	8	5	140.0	65	177	2.7	4
