= Devontez Walker =

American football player (born 2001)

No. 81 – Baltimore Ravens
- Position: Wide receiver
- Roster status: Active

Personal information
- Born: June 19, 2001 (age 25)
- Listed height: 6 ft 1 in (1.85 m)
- Listed weight: 198 lb (90 kg)

Career information
- High school: West Charlotte
- College: Kent State (2021–2022); North Carolina (2023)
- NFL draft: 2024: 4th round, 113th overall pick

Career history
- Baltimore Ravens (2024–present)

Awards and highlights
- First-team All-MAC (2022); Third-team All-ACC (2023)

Career NFL statistics as of 2025
- Receptions: 7
- Receiving yards: 157
- Touchdowns: 4
- Stats at Pro Football Reference

Devontez "Tez" Walker (born June 19, 2001) is an American professional football wide receiver for the Baltimore Ravens of the National Football League (NFL). He played college football for the Kent State Golden Flashes and North Carolina Tar Heels.

== Early life ==
Walker was born on June 19, 2001, later attending West Charlotte High School. In Walker's high school football career, he brought in 48 receptions for 923 yards and two touchdowns. Walker also played on defense, racking up 36 tackles, ten pass deflections, and six interceptions. Walker committed to play college football at North Carolina Central.

== College career ==
=== North Carolina Central ===
Enrolling at North Carolina Central in 2020, Walker did not play in any games as the FCS season had been canceled due to the COVID-19 pandemic.

=== Kent State ===
Walker transferred to Kent State in 2021. He made his collegiate debut in week one of the 2021 season, where he caught one pass for three yards, as Kent State was defeated by #6 Texas A&M 41–10. In the team's bowl game, Walker caught one pass for 74 yards and a touchdown in Kent State's Golden Flashes' 52–38 loss against Wyoming. Walker finished the 2021 season with five receptions for 124 yards and a touchdown.

The 2022 season was a strong one for Walker. Against reigning national champions Georgia, Walker had one of the best performances of his career, with seven receptions for 106 yards and a touchdown, but Kent State lost to the Bulldogs 39–22. Walker had good performances the following two weeks, catching six passes for 107 yards against Ohio, and 11 receptions for 159 yards and two touchdowns in a loss to Miami (OH), 27–24. In the team's season finale, Walker scored the game-winning touchdown, catching five passes for 84 yards, as Kent State ended the season with a win against Buffalo.

Walker finished his 2022 season with 58 receptions for 921 yards and 11 touchdowns, while also adding 29 yards and a touchdown on the ground, and was named first team All-MAC.

Following the conclusion of the season and the departure of head coach Sean Lewis, Walker entered the transfer portal.

=== North Carolina ===
After departing Kent State, Walker returned to his home state, transferring to North Carolina. Walker was named to the 2023 Preseason All ACC Team. In a controversial and highly criticized decision, the NCAA ruled Walker a two-time transfer, and he was initially denied eligibility for 2023. After missing four games due to the issue, Walker's eligibility was reinstated for the remainder of the 2023 season.

Walker returned to action against Syracuse and played in eight games, catching 41 passes for 699 yards and seven touchdowns. He caught six passes for 132 yards and three touchdowns in his second game back against Miami. Walker declared for the NFL draft after the conclusion of the regular season, opting out of the Duke's Mayo Bowl in the process.

== Professional career ==
Pre-draft measurables
Height	Weight	Arm length	Hand span	Wingspan	40-yard dash	10-yard split	20-yard split	20-yard shuttle	Vertical jump	Broad jump
6 ft 1 1/2 in (1.87 m)	193 lb (88 kg)	33 1/4 in (0.84 m)	9 1/8 in (0.23 m)	6 ft 7 1/8 in (2.01 m)	4.36 s	1.54 s	2.52 s	4.30 s	40.5 in (1.03 m)	11 ft 2 in (3.40 m)
All values from NFL Combine/Pro Day

Walker was selected by the Baltimore Ravens in the fourth round, 113th overall, of the 2024 NFL draft. The Ravens acquired the pick in a trade that sent Morgan Moses to the New York Jets. On December 15, 2024, in a Week 15 game against the New York Giants, Walker caught his first NFL career reception and touchdown after Lamar Jackson threw a 21-yard pass on 3rd down. The Ravens would later defeat the Giants 35–14. That would be the only offensive statistic Walker had during the regular season, as he spent most of his time on special teams when he was not made inactive.

Walker entered the 2025 campaign as one of Baltimore's auxiliary wide receivers. He recorded two receptions for 26 yards and two touchdowns in a 41–17 victory over the Cleveland Browns in Week 2.

In Week 18 Walker scored the opening touchdown against the Pittsburgh Steelers. He recorded two receptions for 46 yards and a touchdown in a 24-26 loss.
