= Omarion Hampton =

American football player (born 2003)

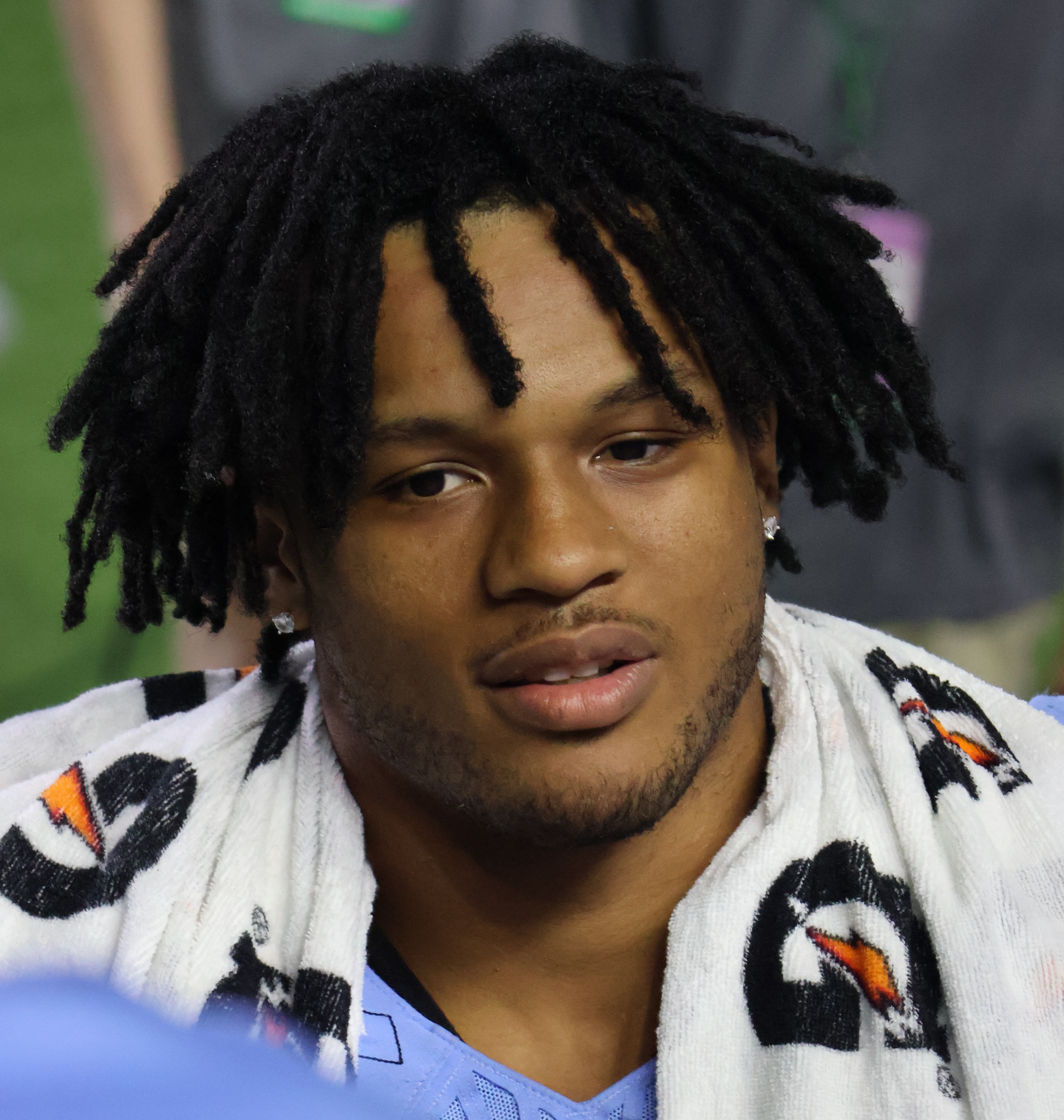
- Hampton with the North Carolina Tar Heels in 2024

No. 8 – Los Angeles Chargers
- Position: Running back
- Roster status: Active

Personal information
- Born: March 16, 2003 (age 23); Forest City, North Carolina, U.S.
- Listed height: 6 ft 0 in (1.83 m)
- Listed weight: 220 lb (100 kg)

Career information
- High school: Cleveland (Clayton, North Carolina)
- College: North Carolina (2022–2024)
- NFL draft: 2025: 1st round, 22nd overall pick

Career history
- Los Angeles Chargers (2025–present)

Awards and highlights
- 2× first-team All-American (2023, 2024); 2× first-team All-ACC (2023, 2024)

Career NFL statistics as of Week 10, 2026
- Rushing yards: 1,019
- Rushing average: 4.1
- Rushing touchdowns: 8
- Receptions: 44
- Receiving yards: 255
- Receiving touchdowns: 1
- Fumbles: 4
- Stats at Pro Football Reference

Omarion Hampton (born March 16, 2003) is an American professional football running back for the Los Angeles Chargers of the National Football League (NFL). He played college football for the North Carolina Tar Heels and was selected by the Chargers in the first round of the 2025 NFL draft.

== Early life ==
Hampton was born on March 16, 2003, in Forest City, North Carolina, and moved to Clayton, North Carolina, when he was in middle school. He attended Cleveland High School in Clayton and played football as a running back from 2018 to 2021. After rushing for 335 yards as a freshman, he had his best season as a sophomore in 2019, being one of the best running backs nationally as he totaled 2,402 rushing yards and 35 touchdowns; he ran for over 100 yards in all but one of their games.

Hampton ran for 685 yards and 13 touchdowns in the spring 2021 season as a junior, although he missed significant time due to an ankle injury. As a senior, he ran for 1,949 yards and 39 touchdowns (having scored a total of 43 touchdowns), averaging 162.4 rushing yards-per-game as he helped Cleveland reach the state playoffs with a record of 11–1. He was named the Gatorade North Carolina Football Player of the Year and the winner of the state's Mr. Football award. Ranked a four-star recruit, he committed to play college football for the North Carolina Tar Heels.

== College career ==
Hampton saw immediate playing time as a true freshman in 2022, recording 101 rushing yards and two touchdowns in his collegiate debut against the Florida A&M Rattlers, becoming the first true freshman for North Carolina to run for over 100 yards in a game since Charlie Justice in 1946. Two games later, he ran for 110 yards and scored game-tying and go-ahead touchdowns against the Georgia State Panthers, being named Atlantic Coast Conference (ACC) Rookie of the Week. He finished the season having appeared in 13 games, four as a starter, and tallied 88 rush attempts for 401 yards and six touchdowns, in addition to six receptions for 40 yards and another score.

In the second game of the 2023 season, Hampton ran 26 times for 234 yards and three touchdowns against Appalachian State, being named the Doak Walker National Running Back of the Week. He continued his strong performance throughout the season, finishing the season with 1,504 rushing yards and 15 touchdowns. For his performance, he earned first-team All-ACC honors, and was named a finalist for the Doak Walker Award. Hampton was also named to several All-America teams, being named a second team All-America by the AP and Sporting News, and first-team by the Walter Camp Football Foundation. In the Tar Heels' season-ending loss to West Virginia in the Duke's Mayo Bowl, he passed Elijah Hood for second-most rushing yards in a single Tar Heel season.

== Professional career ==
Pre-draft measurables
Height	Weight	Arm length	Hand span	Wingspan	40-yard dash	10-yard split	20-yard split	20-yard shuttle	Vertical jump	Broad jump	Bench press
5 ft 11 3/4 in (1.82 m)	221 lb (100 kg)	30 1/2 in (0.77 m)	9 3/8 in (0.24 m)	6 ft 2 3/4 in (1.90 m)	4.46 s	1.54 s	2.57 s	4.40 s	38.0 in (0.97 m)	10 ft 10 in (3.30 m)	18 reps
All values from NFL Combine

Hampton was selected in the first round with the 22nd pick in the 2025 NFL draft by the Los Angeles Chargers. On May 19, 2025, the Chargers signed Hampton to a four-year, $17.77 million rookie contract. On October 6, Hampton was placed on injured reserve after suffering an ankle injury in Week 5 against the Washington Commanders. On December 8, Hampton was activated from injured reserve ahead of the team's Week 14 matchup against the Philadelphia Eagles.

== Career statistics ==
=== NFL ===
==== Regular season ====
Year	Team	Games		Rushing					Receiving					Fumbles	
Year	Team	GP	GS	Att	Yds	Avg	Lng	TD	Rec	Yds	Avg	Lng	TD	Fum	Lost
2025	LAC	9	6	124	545	4.4	54	4	32	192	6.0	22	1	1	0
2026	LAC	9	8	124	474	3.8	32	4	12	63	5.3	18	0	3	2
Career		18	14	248	1,019	4.1	54	8	44	255	5.8	22	1	4	2

==== Postseason ====
Year	Team	Games		Rushing					Receiving					Fumbles	
Year	Team	GP	GS	Att	Yds	Avg	Lng	TD	Rec	Yds	Avg	Lng	TD	Fum	Lost
2025	LAC	1	0	1	−1	−1.0	−1	0	0	0	0.0	0	0	0	0
Career		1	0	1	−1	−1.0	−1	0	0	0	0.0	0	0	0	0

=== College ===
College statistics
Season	Team	Games		Rushing				Receiving			
Season	Team	GP	GS	Att	Yds	Avg	TD	Rec	Yds	Avg	TD
2022	North Carolina	13	3	88	401	4.6	6	6	40	6.7	1
2023	North Carolina	13	11	253	1,504	5.9	15	29	222	7.7	1
2024	North Carolina	12	12	281	1,660	5.9	15	38	373	9.8	2
Career		38	26	622	3,565	5.7	36	73	635	8.7	4
