= Beanie Bishop =

American football player (born 1999)

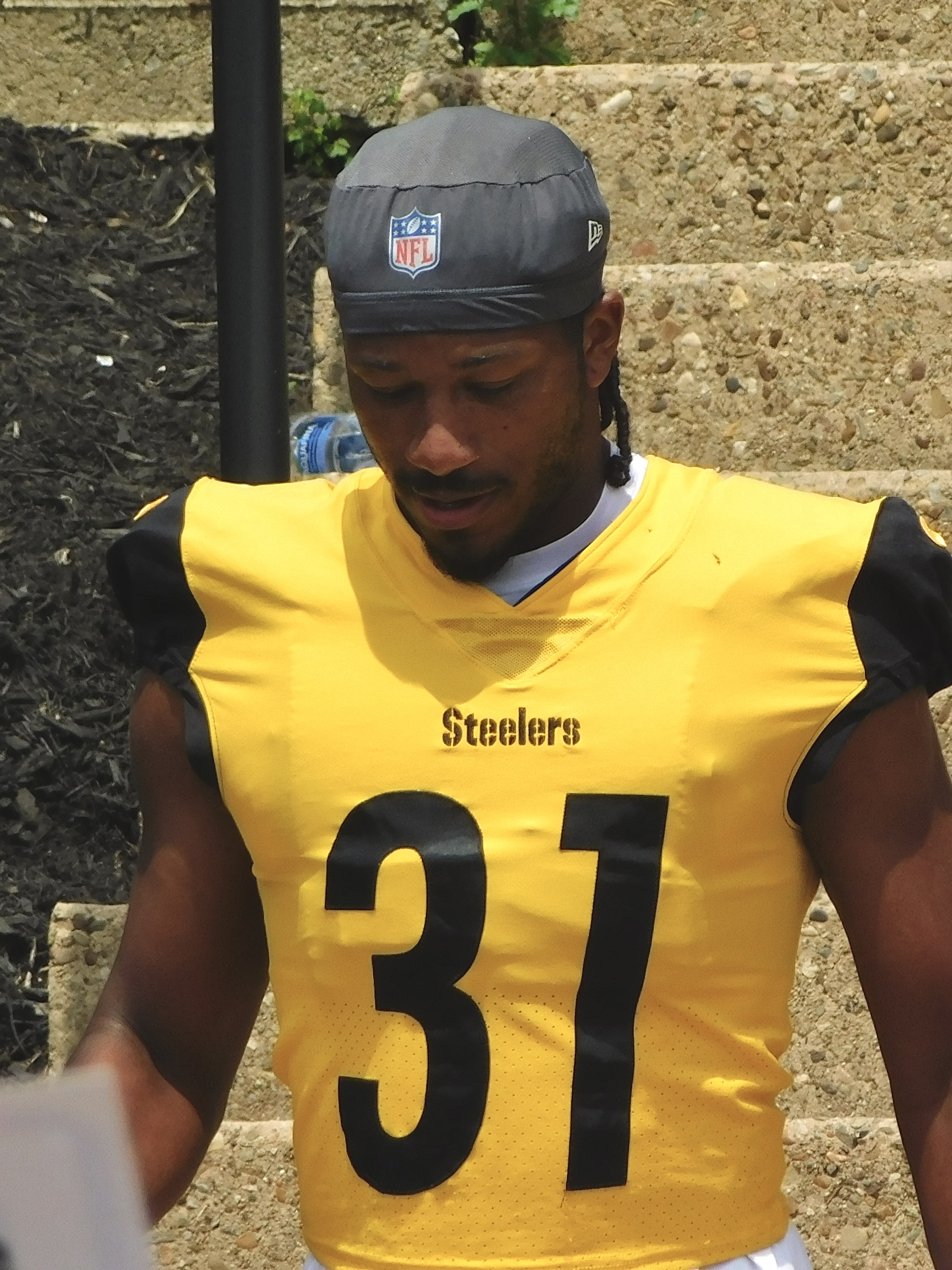
- Bishop with the Pittsburgh Steelers in 2025

St. Louis Battlehawks
- Position: Cornerback
- Roster status: Unsigned draft pick

Personal information
- Born: December 17, 1999 (age 26); Louisville, Kentucky, U.S.
- Listed height: 5 ft 9 in (1.75 m)
- Listed weight: 182 lb (83 kg)

Career information
- High school: Pleasure Ridge (Louisville)
- College: Western Kentucky (2018–2021); Minnesota (2022); West Virginia (2023)
- NFL draft: 2024: undrafted

Career history
- Pittsburgh Steelers (2024–2025); New Orleans Saints (2025)*; Chicago Bears (2026)*; St. Louis Battlehawks (2027-present)
- * Offseason or practice squad member only

Awards and highlights
- First-team All-American (2023); First-team All-Big 12 (2023); First-team All-C-USA (2021)

Career NFL statistics as of 2025
- Total tackles: 45
- Sacks: 0.5
- Pass deflections: 7
- Interceptions: 4
- Stats at Pro Football Reference

Shannon "Beanie" Bishop Jr. (born December 17, 1999) is an American professional football cornerback. He played college football at Western Kentucky, Minnesota and West Virginia.

== Early life ==
Bishop was born in Paramus New Jersey At birth, his godmother referred to him as "my beanie baby", and the nickname "Beanie" stuck. He attended Pleasure Ridge Park High School in Louisville and was football team captain while playing wide receiver, defensive back and return specialist. He was a Class 6A All-District player and played at the Best of the Bluegrass All-Star Game where he was the Greater Louisville Offensive Player of the Game. Ranked a two-star recruit, he committed to play college football for the Western Kentucky Hilltoppers, the only FBS team to give him an offer.

== College career ==
As a true freshman at Western Kentucky in 2018, Bishop played four games and redshirted. The following season, he played 13 games and totaled 17 tackles and a pass breakup. In the COVID-19-shortened 2020 season, Bishop played six games, one as a starter, and tallied 15 tackles with four pass breakups. He was named first-team All-Conference USA in 2021 at cornerback and honorable mention all-conference at kick returner, posting 40 tackles, three interceptions and two pass breakups in 11 games. He entered the NCAA transfer portal after the year.

Bishop ultimately transferred to the Minnesota Golden Gophers for the 2022 season. He appeared in all 13 games for the Golden Gophers and posted 29 tackles, a pass breakup and one sack. He entered the transfer portal in 2023. He signed with the West Virginia Mountaineers for his final season of college football. Bishop led the nation in both pass breakups and passes defended and was named an AP second-team All-American.

== Professional career ==
Pre-draft measurables
Height	Weight	Arm length	Hand span	Wingspan	40-yard dash	10-yard split	20-yard split	20-yard shuttle	Three-cone drill	Vertical jump	Broad jump
5 ft 9 1/8 in (1.76 m)	180 lb (82 kg)	30 3/4 in (0.78 m)	9 3/8 in (0.24 m)	6 ft 0 in (1.83 m)	4.39 s	1.50 s	2.57 s	4.15 s	7.05 s	33.5 in (0.85 m)	10 ft 0 in (3.05 m)
All values from Pro Day

=== Pittsburgh Steelers ===
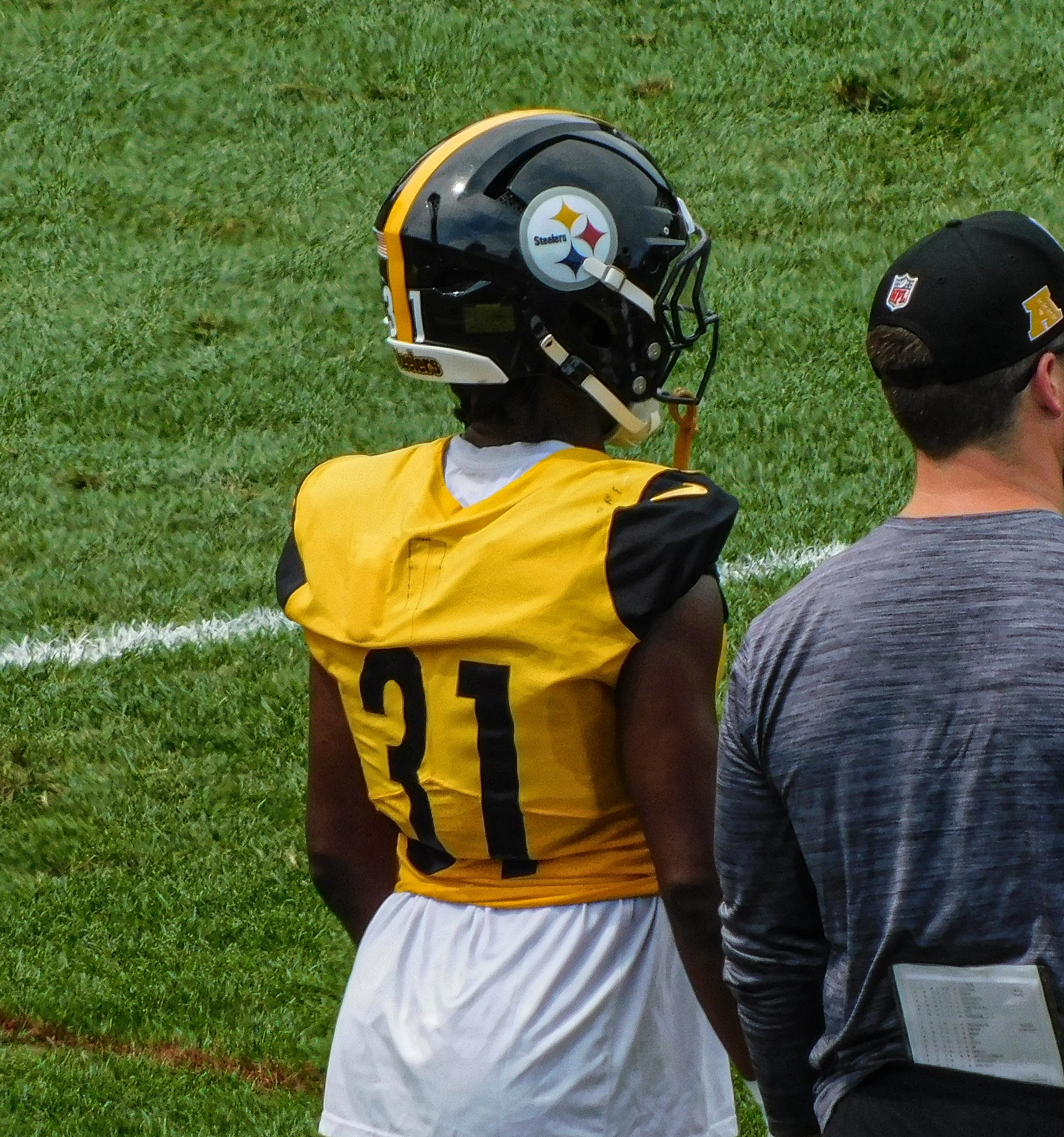
Bishop during Steelers training camp in 2025

Bishop signed with the Pittsburgh Steelers as an undrafted free agent on April 27, 2024. Bishop notably made the Steelers' 53 man roster out of training camp as a UDFA, even earning a starting job in the secondary after an impressive offseason. During a Week 7 game against the New York Jets on Sunday Night Football, Bishop intercepted two passes from Jets quarterback Aaron Rodgers, both of which would ultimately lead to touchdowns for Pittsburgh as they won 37–15. During a Week 8 game against the New York Giants on Monday Night Football, Bishop secured a game ending interception against Daniel Jones, Pittsburgh won 26–18. Bishop was named Defensive Rookie of the Month for October having: 16 tackles, 5 pass deflections, 3 interceptions, and 2 tackles for loss.

On August 26, 2025, Bishop was waived by the Steelers as part of final roster cuts, and re-signed to the practice squad. He was released on November 3.

=== New Orleans Saints ===
On December 2, 2025, Bishop was signed to the New Orleans Saints' practice squad. He signed a reserve/future contract with New Orleans on January 5, 2026. On March 17, Bishop was suspended for the first three games of the 2026 season. He was waived by the Saints on July 28.

=== Chicago Bears ===
On August 9, 2026, Bishop signed with the Chicago Bears. He was waived/injured by the Bears on August 30.
