= Jahiem White =

American football player (born 2005)

No. 1 – North Texas Mean Green
- Position: Running back
- Class: Senior

Personal information
- Born: April 19, 2005 (age 21)
- Listed height: 5 ft 7 in (1.70 m)
- Listed weight: 190 lb (86 kg)

Career information
- High school: William Penn Senior (York, Pennsylvania)
- College: West Virginia (2023–2025); North Texas (2026–present)
- Stats at ESPN

Jahiem White (born April 19, 2005) is an American college football running back for the North Texas Mean Green. He previously played for the West Virginia Mountaineers.

== Early life ==
White attended William Penn Senior High School in York, Pennsylvania. As a senior in 2022, he had 1,918 rushing yards and 37 touchdowns and was named the York Daily Record Offensive Player of the Year. As a junior, he had 2,128 rushing yards and 31 touchdowns. For his high school career, White had a school record 5,780 career rushing yards. He committed to West Virginia University to play college football.

== College career ==
=== West Virginia ===
As a true freshman at West Virginia in 2023, White led the team with 842 yards rushing. He ended the season with 109 carries and four touchdowns.

On December 8, 2025, White announced that he would enter the transfer portal.

=== North Texas ===
On January 7, 2026, White announced that he would transfer to North Texas.
