= Traylon Ray =

American football player (born 2005)

No. 7 – Ole Miss Rebels
- Position: Wide receiver
- Class: (redshirt) Senior

Personal information
- Born: July 24, 2005 (age 21)
- Listed height: 6 ft 2 in (1.88 m)
- Listed weight: 205 lb (93 kg)

Career information
- High school: North Florida Christian (Tallahassee, Florida)
- College: West Virginia (2023–2024); Ole Miss (2025–present)
- Stats at ESPN

Traylon Phason Ray (born July 24, 2005) is an American football wide receiver for the Ole Miss Rebels. He previously played for the West Virginia Mountaineers.

== Early life ==
Ray attended North Florida Christian School in Tallahassee, Florida. He was rated as a four-star recruit by 247Sports and committed to play college football for the West Virginia Mountaineers over offers from Florida, Florida State, Georgia Tech, Miami, Mississippi State, and Tennessee.

== College career ==
=== West Virginia ===
In week 12 of the 2023 season, Ray had receptions for 56 yards versus Oklahoma. He finished his freshman season in 2023 with 18 catches for 321 yards and three touchdowns. During the 2024 season, Ray recorded 28 receptions for 426 yards and four touchdowns. After the conclusion season, he entered the NCAA transfer portal.

=== Ole Miss ===
Ray transferred to play for the Ole Miss Rebels. During the 2025 season, he appeared in three games notching two tackles on special teams.

== Personal life ==
Ray is the nephew of former Auburn receiver Melvin Ray.
