= 2022 North Carolina Tar Heels football team =

American college football season

2022 North Carolina Tar Heels football

ACC Coastal Division champion

ACC Championship, L 10–39 vs. Clemson

Holiday Bowl, L 27–28 vs. Oregon
- Conference: Atlantic Coast Conference
- Coastal Division
- Record: 9–5 (6–2 ACC)
- Head coach: Mack Brown (14th season)
- Offensive coordinator: Phil Longo (4th season)
- Offensive scheme: Air raid
- Defensive coordinator: Gene Chizik (3rd season)
- Co-defensive coordinators: Charlton Warren (1st season); Tommy Thigpen (4th season)
- Base defense: 4–2–5 or 4–3
- Home stadium: Kenan Stadium

2022 Atlantic Coast Conference football standings
	Conf.			Overall
Team	W		L	W		L
Atlantic Division
No. 13 Clemson xy$	8	–	0	11	–	3
No. 11 Florida State	5	–	3	10	–	3
Louisville	4	–	4	8	–	5
NC State	4	–	4	8	–	5
Syracuse	4	–	4	7	–	6
Wake Forest	3	–	5	8	–	5
Boston College	2	–	6	3	–	9
Coastal Division
North Carolina xy	6	–	2	9	–	5
Duke	5	–	3	9	–	4
No. 22 Pittsburgh	5	–	3	9	–	4
Georgia Tech	4	–	4	5	–	7
Miami (FL)	3	–	5	5	–	7
Virginia	1	–	6	3	–	7
Virginia Tech	1	–	6	3	–	8
Championship: Clemson 39, North Carolina 10
$ – Conference champion; x – Division champion/co-champions; y – Championship game participant; Rankings from AP Poll

The 2022 North Carolina Tar Heels football team represented the University of North Carolina at Chapel Hill as a member of the Coastal Division of the Atlantic Coast Conference (ACC) for the 2022 NCAA Division I FBS football season. The Tar Heels were led by head coach Mack Brown, who was in the fourth season of his second stint at North Carolina and 14th overall season at the university. The team played their home games at Kenan Stadium.

== Offseason ==
=== Coaching changes ===
Immediately following the bowl-game loss to South Carolina, head coach Mack Brown stated that changes needed to be made. Speculation then began as to what those changes would be, with suggestions including the possibility of certain coaches being let go. The changes began to crystalize when, on January 7, 2022, co-defensive coordinator/safeties coach Jay Bateman and special teams coordinator/outside linebackers coach Jovan Dewitt were let go.

The following day, the school announced the hires of Gene Chizik and Charlton Warren to fill the vacant positions on social media. Chizik was named assistant head coach for defense, and Warren co-defensive coordinator/defensive backs coach. Both Chizik and Warren were on staff in Chapel Hill under former head coach Larry Fedora during the 2015 and 2016 seasons, and were instrumental in turning around a defense that had struggled mightily in the 2014 season, leading to a combined 19 wins during their first stints in Chapel Hill.

Running backs coach Larry Porter, who served as assistant STC in 2021, was elevated to special teams coordinator following Dewitt's departure, while continuing his responsibilities with the running back position.

On February 28, 2022, a day before the beginning of the Tar Heels' spring practice, offensive line coach Stacy Searels left the team to take the same position with Georgia.

The next day, as spring practice kicked off, it was reported by The Athletic's Bruce Feldman and other sources that the Tar Heels were targeting Louisville OL coach Jack Bicknell Jr. for the vacant position, though nothing official was announced by either school. Carolina officially announced Bicknell's hiring on March 3, 2022. Bicknell and offensive coordinator Phil Longo had previously worked together when they were at Ole Miss.

Tar Heel football alumnus and NFL safety Da'Norris Searcy returned to the program in the spring, joining the staff as the director of football student athlete development.

Prior to fall camp getting started, Frank Wilson was added to the staff as senior special teams analyst.

=== Departures ===
==== NFL draft ====
The following Tar Heels were selected in the 2022 NFL Draft. The Tar Heels' four 2022 selections tied for the most draft picks in the ACC.

Round	Pick	Player	Position	NFL team
3	67	Joshua Ezeudu	OL	New York Giants
5	144	Sam Howell	QB	Washington Commanders
5	169	Ty Chandler	RB	Minnesota Vikings
5	175	Marcus McKethan	OL	New York Giants

===== Undrafted free agent signings =====
The following players went unselected in the 2022 NFL Draft, and signed UDFA rookie contracts with NFL teams.

- Tomon Fox (LB) – New York Giants
- Jeremiah Gemmel (LB) – San Francisco 49ers
- Kyler McMichael (DB) – Tampa Bay Buccaneers
- Jordan Tucker (OL) – Pittsburgh Steelers
- Garrett Walston (TE) – San Francisco 49ers

==== Preseason transfers ====
Fifteen members of the 2021 team elected to enter the NCAA transfer portal prior to the 2022 season.

Name	No.	Pos.	Height	Weight	Hometown	Year	New school
Eugene Asante	7	LB	6'1"	220	Chantilly, VA	Junior	Auburn
Khafre Brown	1	WR	6'0"	190	Charlotte, NC	Sophomore	South Florida
Beau Corrales	15	WR	6'3"	210	Georgetown, TX	Graduate†	SMU
Kamarro Edmonds	33	RB	5'11"	235	Havelock, NC	(redshirt) Freshman	East Carolina
Stephen Gosnell	12	WR	6'1"	205	Pilot Mountain, NC	Sophomore	Virginia Tech
Josh Henderson	23	RB	5'11"	215	Princeton, NJ	Junior	Indiana
Tyrone Hopper	42	LB	6'4"	245	Roswell, GA	Graduate†	Missouri
Teagen Lenderink	96	PK	6'1"	175	Belmont, MI	Freshman‡	Liberty
Trey Morrison	4	DB	5'9"	190	Norcross, GA	Graduate†	Oklahoma
Alex Nobles	97	LB	6'2"	250	Rocky Mount, NC	Senior‡	FIU
Clyde Pinder	55	DL	6'0"	300	Seffner, FL	Sophomore	South Florida
Cameron Roseman-Sinclair	3	DB	5'11"	180	Charlotte, NC	(redshirt) Sophomore	TBD
Emery Simmons	0	WR	6'1"	195	Hope Mills, NC	Junior	Indiana
Trevion Stevenson	26	LB	6'4"	240	Hampton, VA	(redshirt) Freshman	Norfolk State
Kristian Varner	93	DL	6'6"	300	Hiram, GA	Sophomore	Georgia Southern

† Elected to use extra year of eligibility granted by the NCAA in response to COVID-19.
‡ Walk-on

==== Other preseason departures ====
Three players left the team for personal reasons.

Name	No.	Pos.	Height	Weight	Hometown	Year	Reason for departure
Wisdom Asaboro	77	OL	6'8"	332	Warri, Nigeria	Junior	Medical Retirement
Quiron Johnson	69	OL	6'2"	313	Reidsville, NC	Graduate	Forgoing remaining eligibility
Ethan West	19	LB	6'3"	245	Richmond, VA	Sophomore	Medical Retirement

=== Additions ===
==== Incoming transfers ====
Name	No.	Pos.	Height	Weight	Year	Hometown	Prev. school
Lejond Cavazos	6	DB	6'0"	195	(redshirt) Sophomore	San Antonio, TX	Ohio State
Jacolbe Cowan	93	DL	6'4"	275	(redshirt) Sophomore	Charlotte, NC	Ohio State
Corey Gaynor	65	OL	6'4"	308	Graduate	Parkland, FL	Miami (FL)
Spencer Rolland	75	OL	6'6"	285	Graduate	Saint Paul, MN	Harvard
Noah Taylor	7	OLB	6'5"	235	Graduate	Silver Spring, MD	Virginia

==== Recruiting class ====
North Carolina signed 17 players in the class of 2022. The Tar Heels' class finished 10th in both the 247Sports and Rivals rankings. Nine signees were ranked in the final ESPN 300 top prospect list.

College recruiting
Name	Hometown	School	Height	Weight	Commit date
Zach Rice; OL	Lynchburg, VA	Liberty Christian Academy	6 ft 6 in (1.98 m)	285 lb (129 kg)	Oct 21, 2021
Zach Rice; OL	Recruit ratings: Rivals: 247Sports: ESPN: (92)				
Travis Shaw; DL	Greensboro, NC	Grimsley	6 ft 5 in (1.96 m)	310 lb (140 kg)	Aug 21, 2021
Travis Shaw; DL	Recruit ratings: Rivals: 247Sports: ESPN: (86)				
Tychaun Chapman; WR	Virginia Beach, VA	Landstown	5 ft 10 in (1.78 m)	170 lb (77 kg)	Dec 19, 2020
Tychaun Chapman; WR	Recruit ratings: Rivals: 247Sports: ESPN: (84)				
Andre Greene Jr. WR	Richmond, VA	St. Christopher's	6 ft 3 in (1.91 m)	180 lb (82 kg)	Nov 17, 2021
Andre Greene Jr. WR	Recruit ratings: Rivals: 247Sports: ESPN: (84)				
George Pettaway; RB	Suffolk, VA	Nansemond-Suffolk Academy	5 ft 11 in (1.80 m)	175 lb (79 kg)	Sep 22, 2021
George Pettaway; RB	Recruit ratings: Rivals: 247Sports: ESPN: (84)				
Sebastian Cheeks; LB	Evanston, IL	Evanston Township	6 ft 3 in (1.91 m)	210 lb (95 kg)	Jul 28, 2021
Sebastian Cheeks; LB	Recruit ratings: Rivals: 247Sports: ESPN: (83)				
Omarion Hampton; RB	Clayton, NC	Cleveland	6 ft 0 in (1.83 m)	215 lb (98 kg)	Jul 22, 2021
Omarion Hampton; RB	Recruit ratings: Rivals: 247Sports: ESPN: (82)				
Tayon Holloway; DB	Virginia Beach, VA	Green Run	5 ft 11 in (1.80 m)	165 lb (75 kg)	Dec 25, 2020
Tayon Holloway; DB	Recruit ratings: Rivals: 247Sports: ESPN: (81)				
Malaki Hamrick; EDGE	Shelby, NC	Shelby	6 ft 3 in (1.91 m)	190 lb (86 kg)	Feb 26, 2021
Malaki Hamrick; EDGE	Recruit ratings: Rivals: 247Sports: ESPN: (81)				
Marcus Allen; DB	Marietta, GA	Walton	6 ft 2 in (1.88 m)	170 lb (77 kg)	Jun 30, 2021
Marcus Allen; DB	Recruit ratings: Rivals: 247Sports: ESPN: (80)				
Deuce Caldwell; LB	Mauldin, SC	Mauldin	6 ft 1 in (1.85 m)	210 lb (95 kg)	Jun 25, 2021
Deuce Caldwell; LB	Recruit ratings: Rivals: 247Sports: ESPN: (78)				
Beau Atkinson; EDGE	Raleigh, NC	Leesville Road	6 ft 6 in (1.98 m)	235 lb (107 kg)	Jun 16, 2021
Beau Atkinson; EDGE	Recruit ratings: Rivals: 247Sports: ESPN: (78)				
Bryson Jennings; EDGE	Midlothian, VA	Clover Hill	6 ft 6 in (1.98 m)	230 lb (100 kg)	Jul 15, 2021
Bryson Jennings; EDGE	Recruit ratings: Rivals: 247Sports: ESPN: (78)				
Trevyon Green; OL	Colonial Heights, VA	Life Christian Academy	6 ft 7 in (2.01 m)	340 lb (150 kg)	Jan 21, 2021
Trevyon Green; OL	Recruit ratings: Rivals: 247Sports: ESPN: (78)				
Conner Harrell; QB	Alabaster, AL	Thompson	6 ft 1 in (1.85 m)	190 lb (86 kg)	Jul 4, 2021
Conner Harrell; QB	Recruit ratings: Rivals: 247Sports: ESPN: (77)				
Will Hardy; DB	Norcross, GA	Greater Atlanta Christian	6 ft 2 in (1.88 m)	190 lb (86 kg)	Dec 13, 2021
Will Hardy; DB	Recruit ratings: Rivals: 247Sports: ESPN: (77)				
Justin Kanyuk; OL	Bethel Park, PA	Bethlehem Catholic	6 ft 6 in (1.98 m)	290 lb (130 kg)	Jun 27, 2021
Justin Kanyuk; OL	Recruit ratings: Rivals: 247Sports: ESPN: (76)				
Overall recruit ranking: Rivals: #10 247Sports: #10
Note: In many cases, Scout, Rivals, 247Sports, On3, and ESPN may conflict in their listings of height and weight.; In these cases, the average was taken. ESPN grades are on a 100-point scale.; Sources: "Rivals commits". Rivals.; "ESPN commits". ESPN.; "2021 Team Ranking". Rivals.com.; "247Sports commits". 247Sports.

== Preseason ==
=== ACC Media Poll ===
2022 ACC Football Media Days were held at The Westin Charlotte on July 20 and 21, 2022. At that event, head coaches and player representatives from the 14 ACC teams met with the media and discussed the upcoming season. Following the event, the ACC released a preseason poll on July 26, 2022 which was voted on by members of the sports media.

Coastal Division
Predicted finish	Team	Points (1st place votes)
1	Miami	1,036 (98)
2	Pittsburgh	911 (38)
3	North Carolina	823 (18)
4	Virginia	667 (6)
5	Virginia Tech	592 (3)
6	Georgia Tech	343 (1)
7	Duke	220

Overall Champion
Rank	Team	Votes
1	Clemson	103
2	NC State	38
3	Miami	8
4	Wake Forest	4
5	Pittsburgh	3
	Virginia	3
7	Florida State	2
	North Carolina	2
9	Boston College	1

=== Preseason All-ACC Team ===
North Carolina had one player selected by the media make the 2022 Preseason All-ACC Team.

Josh Downs – WR/Specialist

=== Preseason All-Americans ===
Josh Downs (Sporting News) – 2nd Team (WR)

=== Award watch lists ===
Award	Player	Position	Year
Lott Trophy	Tony Grimes	DB	Jr.
Maxwell Award	Josh Downs	WR	Jr.
Doak Walker Award	British Brooks	RB	GS
Biletnikoff Award	Josh Downs	WR	Jr.
Bronko Nagurski Trophy	Myles Murphy	DL	Jr.
Outland Trophy	Myles Murphy	DL	Jr.
Ray Guy Award	Ben Kiernan	P	Sr.
Walter Camp Award	Josh Downs	WR	Jr.
Bednarik Award	Myles Murphy	DL	Jr.
Mannelly Award	Drew Little	LS	Sr.

== Personnel ==
=== Coaching staff ===
North Carolina Tar Heels coaches
Mack Brown	Head coach	4th of second stint, 14th overall
Phil Longo	Offensive coordinator/quarterbacks coach	4th
John Lilly	Tight end coach	3rd
Jack Bicknell Jr.	Offensive line coach	1st
Lonnie Galloway	Assistant head coach/Wide receivers coach	4th
Larry Porter	Special Teams/Running backs	2nd
Gene Chizik	Assistant head coach for defense	1st of second stint, 3rd overall
Charlton Warren	Co-defensive Coordinator/Defensive backs coach	1st
Tommy Thigpen	Co-defensive coordinator/Inside Linebackers coach	5th
Tim Cross	Defensive line coach	4th
Dre Bly	Cornerbacks coach	4th
Brian Hess	Strength and conditioning	4th
Natrone Means	Offensive analyst	2nd
Frank Wilson	Senior Special Teams Analyst/Coordinator	1st
Sparky Woods	Senior advisor to head coach	4th
Darrell Moody	Senior advisor to head coach	4th

=== Roster ===
2022 North Carolina Tar Heels Football Roster
Quarterback: 10 Drake Maye – (redshirt) freshman (6'5, 216); 14 Jefferson Boaz – sophomore (6'7, 250); 15 Conner Harrell – freshman (6'1, 195); 16 Russell Tabor – (redshirt) freshman (6'3, 205); Running back: 4 Caleb Hood – sophomore (5'11, 227); 21 Elijah Green – sophomore (5'11, 198); 23 George Pettaway – freshman (5'11, 190); 24 British Brooks – senior (5'11, 226); 26 D.J. Jones – junior (5'10, 202); 28 Omarion Hampton – freshman (6'0, 220); Wide receiver: 0 Tychaun "Doc" Chapman – freshman (5'10, 170); 1 Andre Greene Jr. – freshman (6'2, 190); 2 Gavin Blackwell – (redshirt) freshman (5'11, 170); 3 Antoine Green – senior (6'2, 207); 5 J.J. Jones – sophomore (6'2, 210); 8 Kobe Paysour – (redshirt) freshman (6'1, 180); 11 Josh Downs – junior (5'10, 171); 19 Grady Sherrill – freshman (5'8, 160); 20 Brooks Miller – (redshirt) freshman (5'11, 167); 25 Kellan Hood – freshman (5'11, 185); 27 Michael Hall – freshman (6'1, 180); 29 Jeffrey Saturday – junior (5'10, 183); 38 Aiden Cloninger – freshman (5'11, 180); 83 Justin Olson – junior (6'2, 189); 84 Cyrus Rogers – (redshirt) freshman (5'11, 178); 85 Landon Stevens – sophomore (6'2, 201); 86 Thomas Flynn – (redshirt) freshman (6'3, 210); Placekicker: 90 Todd Pledger – (redshirt) freshman (6'5, 195); 98 Noah Burnette – sophomore (5'9, 175); Punter: 91 Ben Kiernan – senior (6'0, 215); 92 Cole Maynard — (redshirt) Freshman (6'2, 172)	Tight end: 18 Bryson Nesbit – sophomore (6'6, 220); 80 Will Crowley – junior (5'11, 240); 81 John Copenhaver – sophomore (6'3, 235); 88 Kamari Morales – junior (6'2, 242); 89 Jake Young – freshman (6'3, 225); Offensive line: 52 Jonathan Adorno – junior (6'4, 301); 54 Chance Carroll – sophomore (6'2, 295); 55 Zach Rice – freshman (6'6, 315); 57 Cayden Baker – sophomore (6'5, 316); 60 Carter Kulka – (redshirt) freshman (6'5, 255); 61 Diego Pounds – (redshirt) freshman (6'7, 330); 63 Ed Montilus – senior (6'4, 309); 64 Malik McGowan – sophomore (6'3, 330); 65 Corey Gaynor – graduate (6'4, 309); 68 Brian Anderson – graduate (6'3, 294); 69 Jarvis Hicks – freshman (6'6, 300); 70 Noland Brown – junior (6'0, 295); 72 Asim Richards – senior (6'4, 320); 73 Eli Sutton – (redshirt) freshman (6'8, 308); 74 Justin Kanyuk – freshman (6'6, 325); 75 Spencer Rolland – graduate (6'6, 310); 76 William Barnes – senior (6'4, 320); 78 Trevyon Green – freshman (6'7, 345); 79 Bo Burkes – freshman (6'1, 285); Defensive line: 4 Travis Shaw – freshman (6'5, 360); 5 Jahvaree Ritzie – sophomore (6'5, 284); 8 Myles Murphy – junior (6'4, 300); 10 Desmond Evans – junior (6'6, 261); 12 Beau Atkinson – freshman (6'6, 240); 41 Kedrick Bingley-Jones – sophomore (6'4, 313); 51 Raymond Vohasek – graduate (6'3, 300); 56 Tomari Fox – senior (6'2, 290); 88 Deems May – freshman (6'2, 195); 92 Kody Kovacevic Freshman (6'3, 240); 93 Jacolbe Cowan – sophomore (6'4, 275); 96 Nic Harvey – freshman (6'1, 340); 98 Kevin Hester Jr. – junior (6'4, 306)	Jack: 7 Noah Taylor – graduate (6'5, 235); 34 Gabe Stephens – (redshirt) freshman (6'4, 204); 87 Colby Doreen – sophomore (6'4, 228); Linebacker: 19 Bryson Jennings – freshman (6'4, 230); 23 Power Echols – sophomore (5'11, 225); 24 Malaki Hamrick – freshman (6'4, 200); 25 Kaimon Rucker – junior (6'1, 262); 32 Sebastian Cheeks – freshman (6'3, 220); 33 Cedric Gray – sophomore (6'1, 225); 36 Jalen Brooks – sophomore (6'0, 236); 44 Randy "Deuce" Caldwell – freshman (6'0, 225); 45 Jake Harkleroad – junior (5'10, 210); 47 CJ Murphy – freshman (6'1, 225); 48 Milad Aghaiepour – sophomore (5'10, 215); 53 Gibson Macrae – (redshirt) freshman (6'2, 211); Defensive back: 0 Ja'Qurious Conley – junior (6'1, 205); 1 Tony Grimes – junior (6'0, 195); 2 Don Chapman – senior (6'1, 187); 3 Storm Duck – junior (6'0, 194); 6 Lejond Cavazos – junior (6'0, 190); 9 Cam'Ron Kelly – senior (6'1, 215); 13 Obi Egbuna – senior (5'10, 190); 14 Dontae Balfour – (redshirt) freshman (6'1, 180); 15 Ladaeson DeAndre Hollins – senior (6'1, 200); 16 DeAndre Boykins – sophomore (5'11, 197); 18 Christopher Holliday – sophomore (6'3, 221); 20 Tayon Holloway – freshman (6'1, 160); 26 Naari Short – sophomore (5'9, 175); 27 Giovanni Biggers – senior (6'1, 193); 29 Marcus Allen – freshman (6'1, 175); 30 Phillips Alvarez – freshman (5'10, 170); 31 Will Hardy – freshman (6'2, 200); 35 Jaden Selby – freshman (6'0, 175); 37 Thomas O'Sullivan – freshman (5'10, 185); 38 Val Edwards – junior (6'2, 200); 39 Zavion Woldu – sophomore (5'11, 195); 40 Major Byrd – freshman (5'9, 190); Long snappers: 43 Garrett Jordan – freshman (6'1, 225); 61 Drew Little – senior (5'11, 236); 62 Spencer Triplett – sophomore (6'3, 235)
* North Carolina Tar Heels Football Roster as of 12/4/2022

=== Depth chart ===
Holiday Bowl Depth Chart

Defense

Star
DeAndre Boykins
Obi Egbuna
-

FS
Will Hardy
Gio Biggers
-

Will	Mike
Cedric Gray	Power Echols
Deuce Caldwell	Jake Harkleroad
-	-

Boundary Safety
Don Chapman OR
Gio Biggers
-
-

CB
Marcus Allen
Tayon Holloway OR
Dontae Balfour
-

DE	DT	DT	DE
Kaimon Rucker	Myles Murphy	Kevin Hester Jr.	Jahvaree Ritzie
Malaki Hamrick	Kedrick Bingley-Jones	Travis Shaw OR; Keeshawn Silver	Jacolbe Cowan
-	-	-	-

CB
Lejond Cavazos
Dae Dae Hollins
-

Offense

WR
Antoine Green
Gavin Blackwell
-

Slot Receiver
Kobe Paysour
Doc Chapman
-

LT	LG	C	RG	RT
Asim Richards	Ed Montilus	Corey Gaynor	William Barnes	Spencer Rolland
Trevyon Green	Cayden Baker	Brian Anderson	Jonathan Adorno	Zach Rice
-	-	-	-	-

TE
Kamari Morales OR
John Copenhaver
Bryson Nesbit
-

WR
JJ Jones
Andre Greene Jr.
-

QB
Drake Maye
Conner Harrell
-

Key reserves
Injured
Ja'Qurious Conley (S; ACL rehab)
Season-ending injury
British Brooks (RB; lower body)
Sebastian Cheeks (LB; shoulder)
Raymond Vohasek (DL; upper body)
Noah Taylor (DL; lower body)
Caleb Hood (RB; upper body)
Desmond Evans (DL; upper body)
Suspension
Tomari Fox (DL)

RB
Elijah Green
Omarion Hampton
DJ Jones OR
George Pettaway

Special teams
PK Noah Burnette
P Ben Kiernan
P Cole Maynard
KR George Pettaway
Will Hardy
PR George Pettaway
Will Hardy
LS Drew Little
H Cole Maynard

True Freshman

== Schedule ==
Date	Time	Opponent	Rank	Site	TV	Result	Attendance	Source
August 27	8:00 p.m.	Florida A&M*		Kenan Stadium; Chapel Hill, NC	ACCN	W 56–24	46,130	
September 3	12:00 p.m.	at Appalachian State*		Kidd Brewer Stadium; Boone, NC	ESPNU	W 63–61	40,168	
September 10	12:00 p.m.	at Georgia State*		Center Parc Stadium; Atlanta, GA	ESPNU	W 35–28	17,687	
September 24	3:30 p.m.	Notre Dame*		Kenan Stadium; Chapel Hill, NC (rivalry)	ABC	L 32–45	50,500	
October 1	3:30 p.m.	Virginia Tech		Kenan Stadium; Chapel Hill, NC	ACCN	W 41–10	45,029	
October 8	4:00 p.m.	at Miami (FL)		Hard Rock Stadium; Miami Gardens, FL	ESPN2	W 27–24	53,751	
October 15	8:00 p.m.	at Duke		Wallace Wade Stadium; Durham, NC (Victory Bell)	ACCN	W 38–35	40,004	
October 29	8:00 p.m.	Pittsburgh^{†}	No. 21	Kenan Stadium; Chapel Hill, NC	ACCN	W 42–24	50,500	
November 5	12:00 p.m.	at Virginia	No. 17	Scott Stadium; Charlottesville, VA (South's Oldest Rivalry)	ACCN	W 31–28	44,156	
November 12	7:30 p.m.	at Wake Forest	No. 15	Truist Field at Wake Forest; Winston-Salem, NC (rivalry)	ESPN2	W 36–34	31,346	
November 19	5:30 p.m.	Georgia Tech	No. 13	Kenan Stadium; Chapel Hill, NC	ESPN2	L 17–21	44,940	
November 25	3:30 p.m.	NC State	No. 17	Kenan Stadium; Chapel Hill, NC (rivalry)	ABC	L 27–30 ^{2OT}	50,500	
December 3	8:00 p.m.	vs. No. 9 Clemson	No. 23	Bank of America Stadium; Charlotte, NC (ACC Championship Game)	ABC	L 10–39	64,115	
December 28	8:00 p.m.	vs. No. 15 Oregon*		Petco Park; San Diego, CA (Holiday Bowl)	FOX	L 27–28	36,242	
*Non-conference game; ^{†}Homecoming; Rankings from AP Poll and CFP Rankings (after November 5); All times are in Eastern time

== Game summaries ==
=== Florida A&M ===
Florida A&M at North Carolina

Team	1	2	3	4	Total
Rattlers	7	7	10	0	24
• Tar Heels	14	14	7	21	56

- Date: August 27, 2022
- Location: Kenan Stadium
  Chapel Hill, NC
- Game start: 8:21 p.m. EDT
- Elapsed time: 3 hours, 24 minutes
- Game attendance: 46,130
- Game weather: Cloudy • 79 °F (26 °C) • Wind: SE 1 MPH
- Referee: Mike Roche
- TV announcers (ACCN): Matt Barrie (play-by-play), Tim Hasselbeck (analyst), and Kelsey Riggs (sideline)

Scoring summary
1	5:51	UNC	Kamari Morales 19 yd. pass from Drake Maye (Noah Burnette kick) (7 plays, 78 yards, 2:21)	UNC 7–0
1	3:21	FAMU	AJ Davis 17 yd. pass from Jeremy Moussa (Jose Romo-Martinez kick) (8 plays, 75 yards, 2:30)	Tie 7–7
1	0:29	UNC	Bryson Nesbit 23 yd. pass from Drake Maye (Noah Burnette kick) (7 plays, 75 yards, 2:52)	UNC 14–7
2	7:39	UNC	Gavin Blackwell 4 yd. pass from Drake Maye (Noah Burnette kick) (12 plays, 83 yards, 5:09)	UNC 21–7
2	2:01	FAMU	Jaylen McCloud 5 yd. rush (Jose Romo-Martinez kick) (12 plays, 75 yards, 5:38)	UNC 21–14
2	0:05	UNC	Josh Downs 2 yd. pass from Drake Maye (Noah Burnette kick) (5 plays, 21 yards, 0:26)	UNC 28–14
3	12:10	UNC	Omarion Hampton 1 yd. rush (Noah Burnette kick) (7 plays, 65 yards, 2:50)	UNC 35–14
3	7:41	FAMU	Jose Romo-Martinez 35 yd. field goal (10 plays, 57 yards, 4:29)	UNC 35–17
3	1:18	FAMU	Trevonte Davis 22 yd. pass from Jeremy Moussa (Jose Romo-Martinez kick) (5 plays, 60 yards, 2:34)	UNC 35–24
4	13:24	UNC	George Pettaway 29 yd. rush (Noah Burnette kick) (8 plays, 77 yards, 2:49)	UNC 42–24
4	12:37	UNC	Josh Downs 27 yd. pass from Drake Maye (Noah Burnette kick) (1 play, 27 yards, 0:06)	UNC 49–24
4	8:14	UNC	Omarion Hampton 25 yd. rush (Noah Burnette kick) (4 plays, 44yards, 1:33)	UNC 56–24

Statistics	FAMU	UNC
First downs	20	29
Plays–yards	68–335	78–608
Rushes–yards	27–56	40–314
Passing yards	279	294
Passing: comp–att–int	28–39–1	29–38–0
Turnovers		
Time of possession	29:01	30:59

Team	Category	Player	Statistics
FAMU	Passing	Jeremy Moussa	28/38, 279 yards, 2 TD, INT
FAMU	Rushing	Terrell Jennings	10 carries, 39 yards
FAMU	Receiving	Xavier Smith	10 receptions, 78 yards
North Carolina	Passing	Drake Maye	29/37, 294 yards, 5 TD
North Carolina	Rushing	Omarion Hampton	14 carries, 101 yards, 2 TD
North Carolina	Receiving	Josh Downs	9 rec, 78 yards, 2 TD

=== At Appalachian State ===
North Carolina at Appalachian State

Team	1	2	3	4	Total
• Tar Heels	7	21	13	22	63
Mountaineers	14	7	0	40	61

- Date: September 3, 2022
- Location: Kidd Brewer Stadium
  Boone, NC
- Game start: 12:07 p.m. EDT
- Elapsed time: 4 hours, 10 minutes
- Game attendance: 40,168
- Game weather: Cloudy • 73 °F (23 °C)
- Referee: Jerry Magallanes
- TV announcers (ESPNU): Mark Neely (play-by-play), Charles Arbuckle (analyst), and Dana Boyle (sideline)

Scoring summary
1	11:36	ASU	Nate Noel 52 yd. rush (Michael Hughes kick) (8 plays, 75 yards, 3:24)	ASU 7–0
1	8:21	UNC	JJ Jones 23 yd. pass from Drake Maye (Noah Burnette kick) (8 plays, 75yards, 3:15)	Tie 7–7
1	6:35	ASU	Henry Pearson 22 yd. pass from Chase Brice (Michael Hughes kick) (5 plays, 75 yards, 1:46)	ASU 14–7
2	14:18	ASU	Christian Wells 2 yd. pass from Chase Brice (Michael Hughes kick) (11 plays, 65 yards, 5:21)	ASU 21–7
2	9:30	UNC	Kobe Paysour 14 yd. pass from Drake Maye (Noah Burnette kick) (10 plays, 75 yards, 4:48)	ASU 21–14
2	4:08	UNC	George Pettaway 21 yd. rush (Noah Burnette kick) (7 plays, 66 yards, 3:05)	Tie 21–21
2	0:01	UNC	Bryson Nesbit 10 yd. pass from Drake Maye (Noah Burnette kick) (9 plays, 72 yards, 1:43)	UNC 28–21
3	11:55	UNC	Drake Maye 12 yd. rush (Noah Burnette kick) (8 plays, 75 yards, 3:05)	UNC 35–21
3	2:21	UNC	Noah Burnette 47 yd. field goal (8 plays, 34 yards, 3:08)	UNC 38–21
3	0:11	UNC	Noah Burnette 44 yd. field goal (4 plays, 2 yards, 1:49)	UNC 41–21
4	12:10	ASU	Nate Noel 1 yd. rush (Michael Hughes kick) (8 plays, 71 yards, 2:55)	UNC 41–28
4	10:37	ASU	Miller Gibbs 13 yd. pass from Chase Brice (Michael Hughes kick) (3 plays, 28 yards, 1:33)	UNC 41–35
4	9:25	UNC	Omarion Hampton 2 yd. rush (Drake Maye rush) (3 plays, 75 yards, 1:12)	UNC 49–35
4	7:20	ASU	Christan Horn 31 yd. pass from Chase Brice (Michael Hughes kick) (8 plays, 77 yards, 2:01)	UNC 49–42
4	4:00	ASU	Camerun Peoples 38 yd. rush (Michael Hughes kick) (3 plays, 64 yards, 0:46)	Tie 49–49
4	2:50	UNC	DJ Jones 42 yd. pass from Drake Maye (Noah Burnette kick) (5 plays, 75 yards, 1:10)	UNC 56–49
4	0:31	ASU	Dashaun Davis 28 yd. pass from Chase Brice (Dashaun Davis pass from Chase Brice failed) (8 plays, 75 yards, 2:19)	UNC 56–55
4	0:28	UNC	Bryson Nesbit 43 yd. kickoff return (Noah Burnette kick)	UNC 63–55
4	0:09	ASU	Kaedin Robinson 26 yd. pass from Chase Brice (Chase Brice rush failed) (2 plays, 48 yards, 0:10)	UNC 63–61

Statistics	UNC	App
First downs	29	36
Plays–yards	71–567	79–649
Rushes–yards	35–215	43–288
Passing yards	352	361
Passing: comp–att–int	24–36–0	25–36–1
Turnovers		
Time of possession	27:57	32:03

Team	Category	Player	Statistics
North Carolina	Passing	Drake Maye	24/36, 352 yards, 4 TD
North Carolina	Rushing	Caleb Hood	6 carries, 87 yards
North Carolina	Receiving	Kobe Paysour	8 receptions, 92 yards, TD
App State	Passing	Chase Brice	25/36, 361 yards, 6 TD, INT
App State	Rushing	Nate Noel	14 carries, 116 yards, 2 TD
App State	Receiving	Dashaun Davis	6 receptions, 72 yards, TD

=== At Georgia State ===
North Carolina at Georgia State

Team	1	2	3	4	Total
• Tar Heels	7	14	7	7	35
Panthers	3	7	18	0	28

- Date: September 10, 2022
- Location: Center Parc Stadium
  Atlanta, GA
- Game start: 12:02 p.m. EDT
- Elapsed time: 3 hours, 28 minutes
- Game attendance: 17,687
- Game weather: Rain
- Referee: Riley Johnson
- TV announcers (ESPNU): Clay Matvick (play-by-play), Rocky Boiman (analyst), and Dawn Davenport (sideline)

Scoring summary
1	11:36	UNC	Kamari Morales 55 yd. pass from Drake Maye (Noah Burnette kick) (7 plays, 75 yards, 3:24)	UNC 7–0
1	4:58	GSU	Michael Hayes 45 yd. field goal (10 plays, 39 yards, 2:52)	UNC 7–3
2	13:44	UNC	DJ Jones 7 yd. rush (Noah Burnette kick) (9 plays, 55 yards, 2:51)	UNC 14–3
2	8:58	UNC	Kobe Paysour 28 yd. pass from Drake Maye (Noah Burnette kick) (8 plays, 78 yards, 3:11)	UNC 21–3
2	5:32	GSU	Kris Byrd 6 yd. pass from Darren Grainger (Michael Hayes kick) (11 plays, 75 yards, 3:26)	UNC 21–10
3	13:27	GSU	Robert Lewis 49 yd. pass from Darren Grainger (Michael Hayes kick) (5 plays, 75 yards, 1:33)	UNC 21–17
3	10:19	GSU	Michael Hayes 45 yd. field goal (7 plays, 29 yards, 3:02)	UNC 21–20
3	2:04	GSU	Robert Lewis 29 yd. pass from Darren Grainger (Jamari Thrash pass from Darren Grainger) (10 plays, 98 yards, 3:33)	GSU 28–21
3	0:33	UNC	Omarion Hampton 58 yd. rush (Noah Burnette kick) (4 plays, 75 yards, 1:31)	Tie 28–28
4	10:42	UNC	Omarion Hampton 2 yd. rush (Noah Burnette kick) (5 plays, 92 yards, 2:24)	UNC 35–28

Statistics	UNC	GSU
First downs	23	23
Plays–yards	68–467	78–421
Rushes–yards	44–183	54–235
Passing yards	284	186
Passing: comp–att–int	19–24–1	16–24–0
Turnovers		
Time of possession	28:22	31:38

Team	Category	Player	Statistics
North Carolina	Passing	Drake Maye	19/24, 284 yards, 2 TD, INT
North Carolina	Rushing	Omarion Hampton	16 carries, 110 yards, 2 TD
North Carolina	Receiving	Kobe Paysour	5 receptions, 73 yards, TD
Georgia State	Passing	Darren Grainger	16/24, 186 yards, 3 TD
Georgia State	Rushing	Tucker Gregg	18 carries, 79 yards
Georgia State	Receiving	Robert Lewis	7 receptions, 115 yards, 2 TD

North Carolina was the first Power Five team to play a road game at Georgia State.

=== Notre Dame ===
Notre Dame at North Carolina

Team	1	2	3	4	Total
• Fighting Irish	0	24	14	7	45
Tar Heels	7	7	6	12	32

- Date: September 24, 2022
- Location: Kenan Stadium
  Chapel Hill, NC
- Game start: 3:41 p.m. EDT
- Elapsed time: 3 hours, 30 minutes
- Game attendance: 50,500
- Game weather: Cloudy • 72 °F (22 °C) • Wind: SW 8 mph
- Referee: Jeff Flanagan
- TV announcers (ABC): Bob Wischusen (play–by–play), Dan Orlovsky (analyst), and Kris Budden (sideline)

Scoring summary
1	9:53	UNC	Josh Downs 4 yd. pass from Drake Maye (Noah Burnette kick) (12 plays, 76 yards, 4:59)	UNC 7–0
2	12:57	ND	Michael Mayer 10 yd. pass from Drew Pyne (Blake Grupe kick) (8 plays, 83 yards, 3:48)	Tie 7–7
2	10:01	ND	Lorenzo Styles 30 yd. pass from Drew Pyne (Blake Grupe kick) (3 plays, 66 yards, 1:26)	ND 14–7
2	6:55	UNC	Josh Downs 3 yd. pass from Drake Maye (Noah Burnette kick) (9 plays, 76 yards, 3:00)	Tie 14–14
2	2:37	ND	Audric Estimé 1 yd. rush (Blake Grupe kick) (8 plays, 75 yards, 4:18)	ND 21–14
2	0:23	ND	Blake Grupe 40 yd. field goal (12 plays, 52 yards, 1:52)	ND 24–14
3	12:18	ND	Logan Diggs 29 yd. pass from Drew Pyne (Blake Grupe kick) (6 plays, 75 yards, 2:42)	ND 31–14
3	10:21	ND	Audric Estimé 1 yd. rush (Blake Grupe kick) (7 plays, 15 yards, 1:52)	ND 38–14
3	4:08	GNC	Antoine Green 80 yd. pass from Drake Maye (Bryson Nesbit pass from Drake Maye failed) (1 play, 75 yards, 0:11)	ND 38–20
4	13:04	ND	Chris Tyree 1 yd. rush (Blake Grupe kick) (12 plays, 75 yards, 6:04)	ND 45–20
4	9:47	UNC	Omarion Hampton 4 yd. pass from Drake Maye (Bryson Nesbit pass from Drake Maye failed) (9 plays, 75 yards, 3:17)	ND 45–26
4	1:44	UNC	Antoine Green 64 yd. pass from Drake Maye (George Pettaway pass from Drake Maye failed) (7 plays, 80 yards, 1:36)	ND 45–32

Statistics	ND	UNC
First downs	35	18
Plays–yards	85–576	60–367
Rushes–yards	51–287	28–66
Passing yards	289	301
Passing: comp–att–int	24–34–0	17–32–0
Turnovers		
Time of possession	38:13	21:47

Team	Category	Player	Statistics
Notre Dame	Passing	Drew Pyne	24/34, 289 yards, 3 TD
Notre Dame	Rushing	Audric Estimé	17 carries, 134 yards, 2 TD
Notre Dame	Receiving	Michael Mayer	7 receptions, 88 yards, TD
North Carolina	Passing	Drake Maye	17/32, 301 yards, 5 TD
North Carolina	Rushing	Drake Maye	13 carries, 36 yards
North Carolina	Receiving	Antoine Green	3 receptions, 150 yards, 2 TD

=== Virginia Tech ===
Virginia Tech at North Carolina

Team	1	2	3	4	Total
Hokies	3	7	0	0	10
• Tar Heels	7	17	17	0	41

- Date: October 1, 2022
- Location: Kenan Stadium
  Chapel Hill, NC
- Game start: 3:38 p.m. EDT
- Elapsed time: 3 hours, 13 minutes
- Game attendance: 45,029
- Game weather: Rain • 62 °F (17 °C) • Wind: SW 7 MPH
- Referee: Adam Savoie
- TV announcers (ACCN): Dave O'Brien (play-by-play), Tim Hasselbeck (analyst), and Kelsey Riggs (sideline)

Scoring summary
1	9:19	VT	William Ross 34 yd. field goal (9 plays, 59 yards, 3:51)	VT 3–0
1	4:37	UNC	Kamari Morales 3 yd. pass from Drake Maye (Noah Burnette kick) (12 plays, 75 yards, 4:42)	UNC 7–3
2	12:37	UNC	Drake Maye 1 yd. rush (Noah Burnette kick) (11 plays, 85 yards, 4:18)	UNC 14–3
2	10:28	UNC	Antoine Green 16 yd. pass from Drake Maye (Noah Burnette kick) (1 plays, 16 yards, 0:06)	UNC 21–3
2	0:28	VT	Grant Wells 2 yd. rush (William Ross kick) (14 plays, 69 yards, 5:04)	UNC 21–10
2	0:00	UNC	Noah Burnette 44 yd. field goal (4 plays, 48 yards, 0:28)	UNC 24–10
3	7:45	UNC	Drake Maye 2 yd. rush (Noah Burnette kick) (12 plays, 94 yards, 4:00)	UNC 31–10
3	3:50	UNC	Noah Burnette 21 yd. field goal (8 plays, 61 yards, 2:26)	UNC 34–10
3	0:29	UNC	Bryson Nesbit 25 yd. pass from Drake Maye (Noah Burnette kick) (4 plays, 55 yards, 1:56)	UNC 41–10

Statistics	VT	UNC
First downs	14	24
Plays–yards	70–273	73–527
Rushes–yards	35–99	32–160
Passing yards	174	367
Passing: comp–att–int	20–35–1	27–41–0
Turnovers		
Time of possession	31:43	28:17

Team	Category	Player	Statistics
Virginia Tech	Passing	Grant Wells	16/26, 139 yards, INT
Virginia Tech	Rushing	Keshawn King	9 carries, 52 yards
Virginia Tech	Receiving	Kaleb Smith	3 receptions, 49 yards
North Carolina	Passing	Drake Maye	26/36, 363 yards, 3 TD
North Carolina	Rushing	Drake Maye	13 carries, 73 yards, 2 TD
North Carolina	Receiving	Josh Downs	8 receptions, 120 yards

=== At Miami (FL) ===
North Carolina at Miami (FL)

Team	1	2	3	4	Total
• Tar Heels	7	14	3	3	27
Hurricanes	0	17	0	7	24

- Date: October 8, 2022
- Location: Hard Rock Stadium
  Miami Gardens, FL
- Game start: 4:06 p.m. EDT
- Elapsed time: 3 hours, 34 minutes
- Game attendance: Not reported
- Game weather: Cloudy • 82 °F (28 °C) • Wind: NE 14 MPH
- Referee: Mike Roche
- TV announcers (ESPN2): Dave Pasch (play–by–play), Dusty Dvoracek (analyst), and Tom Luginbill (sideline)

Scoring summary
1	8:55	UNC	JJ Jones 74 yd. pass from Drake Maye (Noah Burnette kick) (6 plays, 95 yards, 2:30)	UNC 7–0
2	8:44	UNC	Omarion Hampton 2 yd. run (Noah Burnette kick) (8 plays, 99 yards, 3:08)	UNC 14–0
2	5:50	MIA	Key'Shawn Smith 20 yd. pass from Tyler Van Dyke (Andres Borregales kick) (6 plays, 76 yards, 2:44)	UNC 14–7
2	1:31	UNC	Josh Downs 15 yd. pass from Drake Maye (Noah Burnette kick) (11 plays, 75 yards, 4:19)	UNC 21–7
2	0:28	MIA	Henry Parrish Jr. 7 yd. pass from Tyler Van Dyke (Andres Borregales kick) (9 plays, 72 yards, 1:03)	UNC 21–14
2	0:00	MIA	Andres Borregales 38 yd. field goal (4 plays, 29 yards, 0:21)	UNC 21–17
3	7:58	UNC	Noah Burnette 38 yd. field goal (7 plays, 24 yards, 3:04)	UNC 24–17
4	4:10	UNC	Noah Burnette 19 yd. field goal (18 plays, 81 yards, 8:21)	UNC 27–17
4	2:20	MIA	Colbie Young 16 yd. pass from Tyler Van Dyke (Andres Borregales kick) (7 plays, 63 yards, 1:43)	UNC 27–24

Statistics	UNC	Miami
First downs	22	29
Plays–yards	71–470	81–538
Rushes–yards	43–161	24–42
Passing yards	309	496
Passing: comp–att–int	19–28–2	42–57–1
Turnovers		
Time of possession	31:14	28:46

Team	Category	Player	Statistics
North Carolina	Passing	Drake Maye	19/28, 309 yards, 2 TD, 2 INT
North Carolina	Rushing	Caleb Hood	13 carries, 74 yards
North Carolina	Receiving	JJ Jones	2 receptions, 80 yards, TD
Miami	Passing	Tyler Van Dyke	42/57, 496 yards, 3 TD, INT
Miami	Rushing	Henry Parrish Jr.	11 carries, 19 yards
Miami	Receiving	Will Mallory	8 receptions, 115 yards

=== At Duke ===
North Carolina at Duke

Team	1	2	3	4	Total
• Tar Heels	10	7	14	7	38
Blue Devils	7	14	0	14	35

- Date: October 15, 2022
- Location: Wallace Wade Stadium
  Durham, NC
- Game start: 8:05 p.m. EDT
- Elapsed time: 3 hours, 35 minutes
- Game attendance: 40,004
- Game weather: Sunny • 61 °F (16 °C)
- Referee: Gary Patterson
- TV announcers (ACCN): Wes Durham (play–by–play), Roddy Jones (analyst), and Taylor Davis (sideline)

Scoring summary
1	13:18	UNC	Noah Burnette 45 yd. field goal (5 plays, 47 yards, 1:42)	UNC 3–0
1	8:30	DU	Jordan Waters 2 yd. rush (Charlie Ham kick) (8 plays, 75 yards, 4:48)	DU 7–3
1	4:38	UNC	Kamari Morales 10 yd. pass from Drake Maye (Noah Burnette kick) (11 plays, 75 yards, 3:52)	UNC 10–7
2	5:16	DU	Riley Leonard 74 yd. rush (Charlie Ham kick) (6 plays, 88 yards, 3:03)	DU 14–10
2	1:38	DU	Jaquez Moore 2 yd. rush (Charlie Ham kick) (7 plays, 33 yards, 2:55)	DU 21–10
2	0:13	UNC	Caleb Hood 4 yd. pass from Drake Maye (Noah Burnette kick) (9 plays, 75 yards, 1:25)	DU 21–17
3	9:01	UNC	Elijah Green 1 yd. rush (Noah Burnette kick) (7 plays, 86 yards, 2:45)	UNC 24–21
3	3:54	UNC	Elijah Green 20 yd. rush (Noah Burnette kick) (8 plays, 78 yards, 2:46)	UNC 31–21
4	14:12	DU	Sahmir Hagans 20 yd. pass from Riley Leonard (Charlie Ham kick) (5 plays, 66 yards, 1:44)	UNC 31–28
4	10:12	UNC	Jordan Waters 38 yd. rush (Charlie Ham kick) (7 plays, 79 yards, 2:38)	DU 35–31
4	0:16	UNC	Antoine Green 8 yd. pass from Drake Maye (Noah Burnette kick) (9 plays, 74 yards, 1:53)	UNC 38–35

Statistics	UNC	Duke
First downs	30	27
Plays–yards	74–536	73–542
Rushes–yards	35–156	42–297
Passing yards	380	245
Passing: comp–att–int	28–39–0	20–31–1
Turnovers		
Time of possession	24:32	35:28

Team	Category	Player	Statistics
North Carolina	Passing	Drake Maye	28/38, 380 yards, 3 TD
North Carolina	Rushing	Drake Maye	18 carries, 70 yards
North Carolina	Receiving	Josh Downs	9 receptions, 126 yards
Duke	Passing	Riley Leonard	20/31, 245 yards, TD, INT
Duke	Rushing	Riley Leonard	14 carries, 130 yards, TD
Duke	Receiving	Jalon Calhoun	6 receptions, 55 yards

=== Pittsburgh ===
Pittsburgh at No. 21 North Carolina

Team	1	2	3	4	Total
Panthers	7	10	7	0	24
• No. 21 Tar Heels	7	7	7	21	42

- Date: October 29, 2022
- Location: Kenan Stadium
  Chapel Hill, NC
- Game start: 8:06 p.m. EDT
- Elapsed time: 3 hours, 40 minutes
- Game attendance: 50,500
- Game weather: Cloudy • 60 °F (16 °C) • NE 4 MPH
- Referee: Jeff Heaser
- TV announcers (ACCN): Wes Durham (play-by-play), Tim Hasselbeck (analyst), and Kelsey Riggs (sideline)

Scoring summary
1	11:30	PIT	Israel Abanikanda 6 yd. rush (Ben Sauls kick) (8 plays, 77 yards, 3:25)	PIT 7–0
1	4:46	UNC	Antoine Green 16 yd. pass from Drake Maye (Noah Burnette kick) (10 plays, 59 yards, 4:07)	Tied 7–7
2	13:20	PIT	Israel Abanikanda 4 yd. rush (Ben Sauls kick) (3 plays, 45 yards, 1:27)	PIT 14–7
2	5:14	PIT	Ben Sauls 47 yd. field goal (10 plays, 63 yards, 5:32)	PIT 17–7
2	3:33	UNC	Kobe Paysour 1 yd. pass from Drake Maye (Noah Burnette kick) (5 plays, 75 yards, 1:41)	PIT 17–14
3	10:07	PIT	Israel Abanikanda 22 yd. rush (Ben Sauls kick) (5 plays, 83 yards, 2:44)	PIT 24–14
3	6:05	UNC	Josh Downs 13 yd. pass from Drake Maye (Noah Burnette kick) (12 plays, 75 yards, 4:02)	PIT 24–21
4	14:07	UNC	Elijah Green 2 yd. rush (Noah Burnette kick) (10 plays, 84 yards, 3:57)	UNC 28–24
4	10:46	UNC	Josh Downs 25 yd. pass from Drake Maye (Noah Burnette kick) (3 plays, 49 yards, 0:42)	UNC 35–24
4	9:07	UNC	Antoine Green 13 yd. pass from Drake Maye (Noah Burnette kick) (3 plays, 35 yards, 1:13)	UNC 42–24

Statistics	Pitt	UNC
First downs	14	26
Plays–yards	61–367	75–474
Rushes–yards	30–131	30–86
Passing yards	236	388
Passing: comp–att–int	14–31–0	34–45–0
Turnovers		
Time of possession	28:32	31:28

Team	Category	Player	Statistics
Pittsburgh	Passing	Kedon Slovis	14/31, 236 yards
Pittsburgh	Rushing	Israel Abanikanda	26 carries, 127 yards, 3 TD
Pittsburgh	Receiving	Jared Wayne	7 receptions, 161 yards
North Carolina	Passing	Drake Maye	34/44, 388 yards, 5 TD
North Carolina	Rushing	Drake Maye	14 carries, 61 yards
North Carolina	Receiving	Antoine Green	10 receptions, 180 yards, 2 TD

=== At Virginia ===
No. 17 North Carolina at Virginia

Team	1	2	3	4	Total
• No. 17 Tar Heels	3	7	14	7	31
Cavaliers	7	7	7	7	28

- Date: November 5, 2022
- Location: Scott Stadium
  Charlottesville, VA
- Game start: 12:03 p.m. EDT
- Elapsed time: 3 hours, 16 minutes
- Game attendance: 44,156
- Game weather: Sunny
- Referee: Marcus Woods
- TV announcers (ACCN): Wes Durham (play–by–play), Roddy Jones (analyst), and Taylor Davis (sideline)

Scoring summary
1	10:48	UVA	Brennan Armstrong 4 yd. rush (Will Bettridge kick) (9 plays, 65 yards, 4:12)	UVA 7–0
1	6:32	UNC	Noah Burnette 35 yd. field goal (11 plays, 58 yards, 4:16)	UVA 7–3
2	6:47	UNC	Drake Maye 5 yd. rush (Noah Burnette kick) (13 plays, 80 yards, 5:45)	UNC 10–7
2	2:04	UVA	Xavier Brown 3 yd. rush (Will Bettridge kick) (13 plays, 75 yards, 4:43)	UVA 14–10
3	12:05	UNC	Elijah Green 4 yd. rush (Noah Burnette kick) (8 plays, 75 yards, 2:55)	UNC 17–14
3	7:49	UVA	Ronnie Walker Jr. 1 yd. rush (Will Bettridge kick) (10 plays, 75 yards, 4:16)	UVA 21–17
3	4:13	UNC	Josh Downs 19 yd. pass from Drake Maye (Noah Burnette kick) (8 plays, 71 yards, 3:36)	UNC 24–21
4	13:19	UNC	Elijah Green 22 yd. pass from Drake Maye (Noah Burnette kick) (11 plays, 80 yards, 4:45)	UNC 31–21
4	3:24	UVA	Brennan Armstrong 8 yd. rush (Will Bettridge kick) (7 plays, 71 yards, 0:59)	UNC 31–28

Statistics	UNC	UVA
First downs	29	25
Plays–yards	77–455	74–418
Rushes–yards	40–162	39–186
Passing yards	293	232
Passing: comp–att–int	26–37–0	17–35–1
Turnovers		
Time of possession	33:38	26:22

Team	Category	Player	Statistics
North Carolina	Passing	Drake Maye	26/37, 293 yards, 2 TD
North Carolina	Rushing	Elijah Green	22 carries, 91 yards, TD
North Carolina	Receiving	Josh Downs	15 receptions, 166 yards, TD
Virginia	Passing	Brennan Armstrong	17/35, 232 yards, INT
Virginia	Rushing	Mike Hollins	16 carries, 75 yards
Virginia	Receiving	Sackett Wood Jr.	6 receptions, 94 yards

=== At Wake Forest ===
No. 15 North Carolina at Wake Forest

Team	1	2	3	4	Total
• No. 15 Tar Heels	14	13	6	3	36
Demon Deacons	7	14	13	0	34

- Date: November 12, 2022
- Location: Truist Field at Wake Forest
  Winston-Salem, NC
- Game start: 7:30pm EST
- Game attendance: 31,346
- Referee: Gary Patterson
- TV announcers (ESPN2): Clay Matvick (play-by-play), Rocky Boiman (analyst), and Dawn Davenport (sideline)

Scoring summary
1	9:17	UNC	Josh Downs 12 yd. pass from Drake Maye (Noah Burnette kick) (10 plays, 91 yards, 3:23)	UNC 7–0
1	7:13	UNC	Elijah Green 5 yd. run (Noah Burnette kick) (4 plays, 69 yards, 0:51)	UNC 14–0
1	3:21	WF	Taylor Morin 7 yd. pass from Sam Hartman (Matthew Dennis kick) (11 plays, 78 yards, 3:46)	UNC 14–7
2	13:23	UNC	Josh Downs 7 yd. pass from Drake Maye (Noah Burnette kick) (13 plays, 64 yards, 4:50)	UNC 21–7
2	9:13	WF	Christian Turner 1 yd. run (Matthew Dennis kick) (12 plays, 75 yards, 4:10)	UNC 21–14
2	4:06	WF	Donavon Greene 7 yd. pass from Sam Hartman (Matthew Dennis kick) (5 plays, 36 yards, 1:49)	Tied 21–21
2	2:22	UNC	Josh Downs 20 yd. pass from Drake Maye (Noah Burnette PAT failed) (5 plays, 75 yards, 1:44)	UNC 27–21
3	8:35	WF	A. T. Perry 32 yd. pass from Sam Hartman (Matthew Dennis kick) (9 plays, 73 yards, 3:12)	WF 28–27
3	5:27	UNC	Drake Maye 5 yd. run (Two-Point conversion failed) (10 plays, 69 yards, 3:06)	UNC 33–28
3	4:26	WF	Donavon Greene 60 yd. pass from Sam Hartman (Two-Point conversion failed) (3 plays, 72 yards, 0:52)	WF 34–33
4	2:12	UNC	Noah Burnette 33 yd. field goal (5 plays, 32 yards, 2:08)	UNC 36–34

Statistics	UNC	WF
First downs	30	22
Plays–yards	87–584	72–490
Rushes–yards	38–136	41–170
Passing yards	448	320
Passing: comp–att–int	31–49–0	18–31–1
Turnovers		
Time of possession	33:02	26:58

Team	Category	Player	Statistics
North Carolina	Passing	Drake Maye	31/49, 448 yards, 3 TD
North Carolina	Rushing	Drake Maye	19 carries, 71 yards, TD
North Carolina	Receiving	Josh Downs	11 receptions, 154 yards, 3 TD
Wake Forest	Passing	Sam Hartman	18/31, 320 yards, 4 TD, INT
Wake Forest	Rushing	Justice Ellison	16 carries, 81 yards
Wake Forest	Receiving	Taylor Morin	5 receptions, 106 yards, TD

=== Georgia Tech ===
Georgia Tech at No. 13 North Carolina

Team	1	2	3	4	Total
• Yellow Jackets	0	7	7	7	21
No. 13 Tar Heels	7	10	0	0	17

- Date: November 19, 2022
- Location: Kenan Stadium
  Chapel Hill, NC
- Game start: 5:36pm EST
- Elapsed time: 3 hours, 16 minutes
- Game attendance: 44,940
- Game weather: Clear • 48 °F (9 °C) • Wind: SW 5 MPH
- Referee: Jerry Magallanes
- TV announcers (ESPN2): Beth Mowins (play–by–play), Kirk Morrison (analyst), and Stormy Buonantony (sideline)

Scoring summary
1	10:56	UNC	Elijah Green 80 yd. run (Noah Burnette kick) (1 play, 80 yards, 0:12)	UNC 7–0
2	10:51	UNC	Noah Burnette 31 yd. field goal (16 plays, 45 yards, 7:17)	UNC 10–0
2	3:13	UNC	Elijah Green 1 yd. run (Noah Burnette kick) (4 plays, 55 yards, 0:55)	UNC 17–0
2	0:48	GT	Dontae Smith 2 yd. run (Gavin Stewart kick) (9 plays, 84 yards, 2:20)	UNC 17–7
3	7:31	GT	Taisun Phommachanh 4 yd. run (Gavin Stewart kick) (9 plays, 68 yards, 4:59)	UNC 17–14
4	11:08	GT	Hassan Hall 6 yd. run (Gavin Stewart kick) (9 plays, 81 yards, 5:07)	GT 21–17

Statistics	GT	UNC
First downs	19	16
Plays–yards	72–373	63–365
Rushes–yards	49–186	33–163
Passing yards	187	202
Passing: comp–att–int	15–23–1	16–30–1
Turnovers		
Time of possession	34:27	25:33

Team	Category	Player	Statistics
Georgia Tech	Passing	Zach Gibson	13/18, 174 yards
Georgia Tech	Rushing	Hassan Hall	14 carries, 47 yards, TD
Georgia Tech	Receiving	Malik Rutherford	6 receptions, 68 yards
North Carolina	Passing	Drake Maye	16/30, 202 yards, INT
North Carolina	Rushing	Elijah Green	10 carries, 92 yards, 2 TD
North Carolina	Receiving	Bryson Nesbit	4 receptions, 85 yards

=== NC State ===
NC State at No. 17 North Carolina

Team	1	2	3	4	OT	2OT	Total
• Wolfpack	7	10	0	7	3	3	30
No. 17 Tar Heels	3	7	0	14	3	0	27

- Date: November 25, 2022
- Location: Kenan Stadium
  Chapel Hill, NC
- Game start: 3:36 p.m. EST
- Elapsed time: 3 hours, 57 minutes
- Game attendance: 50,500
- Game weather: Cloudy • 64 °F (18 °C) • Wind: NW 6 MPH
- Referee: Mike Roche
- TV announcers (ABC): Dave Pasch (play-by-play), Dusty Dvoracek (analyst), and Tom Luginbill (sideline)

Scoring summary
1	13:20	NCSU	Jack Chambers 2 yd. rush (Christopher Dunn kick) (3 plays, 67 yards, 0:49)	NCSU 7–0
1	5:13	UNC	Noah Burnette 37 yd. field goal (15 plays, 62 yards, 6:13)	NCSU 7–3
2	12:38	NCSU	Terrell Timmons 28 yd. pass from Ben Finley (Christopher Dunn kick) (7 plays, 55 yards, 3:17)	NCSU 14–3
2	5:03	UNC	Elijah Green 9 yd. rush (Noah Burnette kick) (8 plays, 59 yards, 3:30)	NCSU 14–10
2	0:00	NCSU	Christopher Dunn 29 yd. field goal (7 plays, 32 yards, 0:38)	NCSU 17–10
4	7:53	UNC	Drake Maye 14 yd. rush (Noah Burnette kick) (4 plays, 38 yards, 1:48)	Tied 17–17
4	3:54	NCSU	Devin Carter 26 yd. pass from Ben Finley (Christopher Dunn kick) (3 plays, 29 yards, 0:52)	NCSU 24–17
4	0:00	UNC	Antoine Green 4 yd. pass from Drake Maye (Nosh Burnette kick) (15 plays, 75 yards, 3:54)	Tied 24–24
OT1		UNC	Noah Burnette 26 yd. field goal (6 plays, 17 yards)	UNC 27–24
OT1		NSCU	Christopher Dunn 31 yd. field goal (5 plays, 11 yards)	Tied 27–27
OT2		NCSU	Christopher Dunn 21 yd. field goal	NCSU 30–27

Statistics	NCSU	UNC
First downs	17	23
Plays–yards	66–330	89–351
Rushes–yards	25–59	40–118
Passing yards	271	233
Passing: comp–att–int	27–41–0	29–49–1
Turnovers		
Time of possession	25:48	34:12

Team	Category	Player	Statistics
NC State	Passing	Ben Finley	27/40, 271 yards, 2 TD
NC State	Rushing	Michael Allen	12 carries, 53 yards
NC State	Receiving	Devin Carter	6 receptions, 130 yards, 1 TD
North Carolina	Passing	Drake Maye	29/49, 233 yards, TD, INT
North Carolina	Rushing	Elijah Green	24 carries, 83 yards, TD
North Carolina	Receiving	Antoine Green	8 receptions, 67 yards, TD

=== Vs. No. 9 Clemson (ACC Championship game) ===
North Carolina vs. Clemson
(ACC Championship Game)

Team	1	2	3	4	Total
• No. 9 Tigers	14	10	15	0	39
No. 23 Tar Heels	7	3	0	0	10

- Date: December 3, 2022
- Location: Bank of America Stadium
  Charlotte, NC
- Game start: 8:15pm EST
- Elapsed time: 3 hours, 23 minutes
- Game attendance: 64,115
- Game weather: Cloudy • 58 °F (14 °C) • Wind: W 8 MPH
- Referee: Mike Roche
- TV announcers (ABC): Sean McDonough (play-by-play), Todd Blackledge (analyst), and Molly McGrath (sideline)

Scoring summary
1	8:50	UNC	Drake Maye 3 yd. rush (Noah Burnette Kick) (11 plays, 78 yards, 5:13)	UNC 7-0
1	1:41	CLEM	Davis Allen 1 yd. pass from Cade Klubnik (B.T. Potter Kick) (9 plays, 71 yards, 4:17)	Tied 7-7
1	0:35	CLEM	Phil Mafah 4 yd. rush (B.T. Potter Kick) (2 plays, 23 yards, 0:40)	CLEM 14-7
2	6:02	CLEM	Cade Klubnik 1 yd. rush (B.T. Potter Kick) (5 plays, 84 yards, 1:57)	CLEM 21-7
2	1:20	UNC	Noah Burnette 26 yd. field goal (11 plays, 67 yards, 4:42)	CLEM 21-10
2	0:00	CLEM	B .T. Potter 52 yd. field goal (7 plays, 40 yards, 1:20)	CLEM 24-10
3	5:05	CLEM	Nate Wiggins 98 yd. interception return (Drew Swinney rush)	CLEM 32-10
3	0:42	CLEM	Will Shipley 2-yd rush (B.T. Potter Kick) (9 plays, 86 yards, 3:26)	CLEM 39-10

Statistics	CU	UNC
First downs	17	26
Plays–yards	56-385	79-384
Rushes–yards	21-68	36-111
Passing yards	317	273
Passing: comp–att–int	28-35-0	27-43-2
Turnovers		
Time of possession	24:59	35:01

Team	Category	Player	Statistics
Clemson	Passing	Cade Klubnik	20/24, 279 yards, TD
Clemson	Rushing	Cade Klubnik	7 carries, 30 yards, TD
Clemson	Receiving	Cole Turner	3 receptions, 101 yards
North Carolina	Passing	Drake Maye	26/42, 268 yards, 2 INT
North Carolina	Rushing	Elijah Green	21 carries, 65 yards
North Carolina	Receiving	Josh Downs	11 receptions, 100 yards

=== Vs. No. 15 Oregon (Holiday Bowl) ===
North Carolina vs. No. 15 Oregon
(Holiday Bowl)

Team	1	2	3	4	Total
• No. 15 Ducks	7	7	0	14	28
Tar Heels	7	14	0	6	27

- Date: December 28, 2022
- Location: Petco Park
  San Diego, CA
- Game start: 5:00 p.m. PST
- Elapsed time: 3 hours, 32 minutes
- Game attendance: 36,242
- Game weather: Clear • 59 °F (15 °C) • Wind: W 8 MPH
- Referee: Mark Kluczynski (Big Ten)
- TV announcers (FOX/KGB): Gus Johnson (play-by-play), Joel Klatt (analyst), and Jenny Taft (sideline)/Jon Schaeffer (play-by-play) and Rich Ohrnberger (analyst)

Scoring summary
1	11:05	UO	Bucky Irving 2 yd. rush (Camden Lewis kick) (6 plays, 54 yards, 2:25)	UO 7–0
1	4:37	UNC	Andre Greene Jr. 6 yd. pass from Drake Maye (Noah Burnette kick) (12 plays, 44 yards, 6:19)	Tied 7–7
2	9:13	UO	Bucky Irving 66 yd. rush (Camden Lewis kick) (4 plays, 80 yards, 1:36)	UO 14–7
2	4:34	UNC	Bryson Nesbit 14 yd. pass from Drake Maye (Noah Burnette kick) (10 plays, 75 yards, 4:39)	Tied 14–14
2	0:26	UNC	Kobe Paysour 49 yd. pass from Drake Maye (Noah Burnette kick) (1 play, 49 yards, 0:09)	UNC 21–14
4	9:13	UNC	Noah Burnette 19 yd. field goal (10 plays, 54 yards, 5:29)	UNC 24–14
4	6:58	UO	Troy Franklin 6 yd. pass from Bo Nix (Camden Lewis kick) (5 plays, 61 yards, 2:06)	UNC 24–21
4	2:29	UNC	Noah Burnette 44 yd. field goal (11 plays, 43 yards, 4:22)	UNC 27–21
4	0:19	UO	Chase Cota 6 yd. pass from Bo Nix (8 plays, 79 yards, 2:05)	UO 28–27

Statistics	Oregon	North Carolina
First downs	22	21
Plays–yards	62–414	69–335
Rushes–yards	32–209	34–129
Passing yards	205	206
Passing: comp–att–int	23–30–1	18–35–0
Turnovers		
Time of possession	27:11	32:49

Team	Category	Player	Statistics
Oregon	Passing	Bo Nix	23/30, 205 yards, 2 TD, INT
Oregon	Rushing	Bucky Irving	13 carries, 149 yards, 2 TD
Oregon	Receiving	Terrance Ferguson	5 receptions, 84 yards
North Carolina	Passing	Drake Maye	18/35, 206 yards, 3 TD
North Carolina	Rushing	Elijah Green	17 carries, 50 yards
North Carolina	Receiving	Kobe Paysour	7 receptions, 98 yards, TD

== Rankings ==
Ranking movements Legend: ██ Increase in ranking ██ Decrease in ranking — = Not ranked RV = Received votes
	Week															
Poll	Pre	1	2	3	4	5	6	7	8	9	10	11	12	13	14	Final
AP	RV	RV	RV	RV	RV	RV	RV	22	21	17	15	13	18	24	RV	RV
Coaches	RV	RV	RV	RV	—	RV	25	22	21	15	14	11	17	22	25	RV
CFP	Not released									17	15	13	17	23	—	Not released

== After the season ==
=== All-ACC Selections ===
==== 1st Team ====
- Drake Maye (QB)
- Josh Downs (WR)
- Cedric Gray (LB)

==== 2nd Team ====
- Josh Downs (AP)
- Storm Duck (DB)

==== 3rd Team ====
- Antoine Green (WR)
- Asim Richards (OL)
- Ben Kiernan (P)

==== Honorable Mention ====
- Bryson Nesbit (TE)
- Corey Gaynor (OL)
- Power Echols (LB)

=== All-Americans ===
- Josh Downs (FWAA Second-Team)
- Cedric Gray (Sporting News Second-Team)

=== Individual awards ===
Drake Maye

- ACC Player of the Year
- ACC Offensive Player of the Year
- ACC Rookie of the Year
- ACC Offensive Rookie of the Year
- AP ACC Offensive Player of the Year
- Shaun Alexander Freshman of the Year

Tylee Craft

- Disney Spirit Award

=== Coaching Changes ===
Following the ACC Championship Game multiple outlets reported on December 7, 2022 that offensive coordinator/quarterbacks coach Phil Longo was accepting the same job at Wisconsin. Offensive line coach Jack Bicknell Jr. was reported to follow Longo to Madison.

On December 14, 2022, the Tar Heels made their first move to fill the vacancies, hiring Randy Clements as their new offensive line coach. They later hired Chip Lindsey to fill the offensive coordinator/quarterbacks coach vacancy.

=== Departures ===
==== Transfer Portal Entries ====
In August 2022, the NCAA issued updated guidance for players seeking to transfer. One update to the policy was the institution of transfer windows, with entry periods designated by when specific seasons end (previously players could enter at their discretion any time before the portal closed). In accordance with the new guidance, the 45-day postseason transfer period for football opened on December 5, 2022, and will close in January 2023. A second transfer window will open in May 2023, following the conclusion of spring practices.

The following members of the 2022 Tar Heel team entered the NCAA transfer portal during the postseason transfer period. The player's class is reflective of internal listing on the UNC roster.

Name	No.	Pos.	Height	Weight	Hometown	Year	New school
Dontae Balfour	14	DB	6'1"	180	Starke, FL	(redshirt) Freshman	Charlotte
Tymir Brown	28	DB	6'0"	180	Jacksonville, NC	(redshirt) Freshman	ECU
Chris Collins	17	DL	6'4"	245	Richmond, VA	Graduate	Minnesota
Jacolby Criswell	6	QB	6'1"	225	Morrilton, AR	Sophomore	Arkansas
Raneiria "RaRa" Dillworth	11	LB	6'1"	200	Winston-Salem, NC	Sophomore	ECU
Storm Duck	3	DB	6'0"	200	Boiling Springs, SC	Senior	Penn State
Tony Grimes	1	DB	6'0"	195	Virginia Beach, VA	Junior	Texas A&M
Kendall Karr	82	TE	6'3"	250	Belmont, NC	Sophomore	Coastal Carolina
Cam'Ron Kelly	9	DB	6'1"	210	Chesapeake, VA	Senior	Virginia
Jonathan Kim	95	PK	6'0"	210	Fredericksburg, VA	Senior	Michigan State
Dontavius Nash	21	DB	6'2"	180	Gastonia, NC	(redshirt) Freshman	ECU
Justin Olson	83	WR	6'2"	200	Huntersville, NC	Junior	MTSU
Keeshawn Silver	55	DL	6'5"	315	Rocky Mount, NC	(redshirt) Freshman	Kentucky
Jahlil Taylor	52	DL	6'0"	295	Vienna, GA	Senior	ODU

==== NFL Draft Entries ====
The following players declared for the 2023 NFL draft. Some chose to opt out of the Holiday Bowl.

Name	No.	Pos.	Height	Weight	Hometown	Year	Opt-Out
Josh Downs	11	WR	5'10"	175	Suwanee, GA	Junior	Yes
Antoine Green	3	WR	6'2"	200	Rockledge, FL	Senior	No
Asim Richards	72	OL	6'5"	315	Philadelphia, PA	Senior	No

== Notes ==
Longo left for the same position at Wisconsin prior to the Holiday Bowl. AHC/WR coach Lonnie Galloway served as interim OC and called plays in the game.
Warren and Thigpen have the title of co-defensive coordinator, but serve under Chizik, whose official title is assistant head coach for defense.
