= Power Echols =

American football player (born 2003)

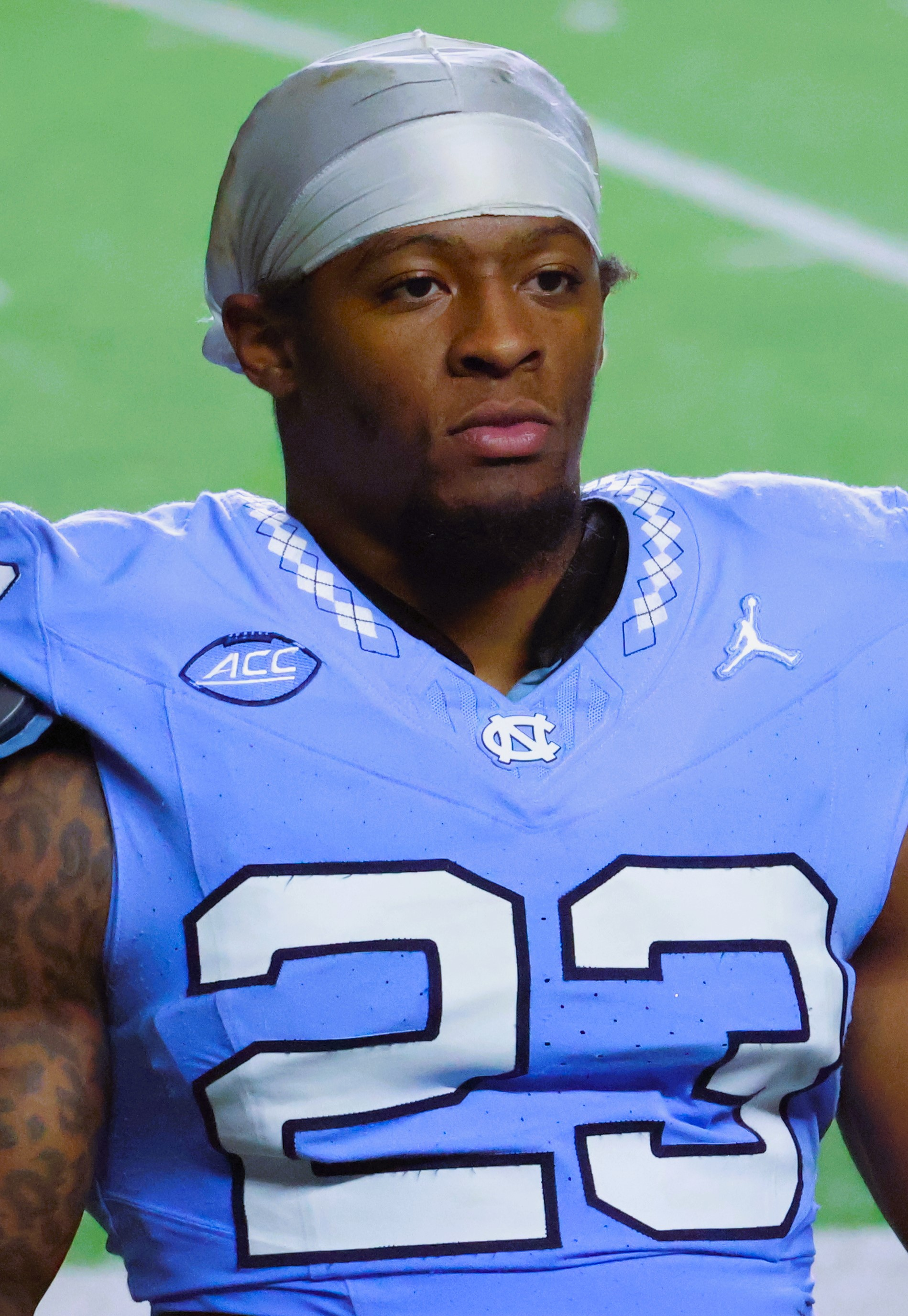
- Echols with the North Carolina Tar Heels in 2024

Profile
- Position: Linebacker

Personal information
- Born: January 20, 2003 (age 23); Charlotte, North Carolina, U.S.
- Listed height: 5 ft 11 in (1.80 m)
- Listed weight: 240 lb (109 kg)

Career information
- High school: Vance (Charlotte, North Carolina)
- College: North Carolina (2021–2024)
- NFL draft: 2025: undrafted

Career history
- Chicago Bears (2025)*; Houston Texans (2025)*; Seattle Seahawks (2026)*
- * Offseason or practice squad member only

Awards and highlights
- Third-team All-ACC (2023)
- Stats at Pro Football Reference

Power Echols (born January 20, 2003) is an American professional football linebacker. He played college football for the North Carolina Tar Heels.

== Early life ==
Echols's father, Brian Echols, played college football at Michigan State. His mother, Astarlove Robinson-Russell, played college basketball at Western Michigan; she named him after the actor Powers Boothe. Echols began playing football at age six, originally as a running back. Before high school, his family moved from Arizona to Charlotte, North Carolina.

Echols attended Vance High School in Charlotte, where he played three seasons for the football team. He changed to defense for his freshman season when his high school coach offered him a starting position at linebacker, and his performance drew national attention including from North Carolina linebackers coach Tommy Thigpen. He led Vance to the NCHSAA 4AA state championship game as a sophomore before winning the state championship in his junior season in 2019, being named MVP of the championship game with 6.5 tackles, 1.5 tackles for loss, and a touchdown. In those two seasons, he was named all-state and the Charlotte Observer Defensive Player of the Year. A four-star recruit, he committed to North Carolina over offers from Clemson and Penn State.

== College career ==
Echols appeared in all 13 games for the North Carolina Tar Heels in his true freshman season in 2021, recording 25 tackles and one interception. He became one of the team's captains and started all 14 games as a sophomore in 2022. Defensive coach Gene Chizik described him as a "tremendous leader on the sideline ... a calming force". He finished his sophomore season with 103 tackles (including a team-high 70 solo tackles) with five going for a loss, two sacks, and one interception, earning an All-ACC honorable mention. His only interception of the season came during a 28–27 loss to Oregon in the 2022 Holiday Bowl, when the ball bounced off Cedric Gray's leg and Echols kept it up with his toe before securing it and running 35 yards.

Echols started all 13 games in his junior season in 2023. He had 102 tackles (including 60 solo) with 5.5 for loss, two forced fumbles, and one interception, earning third-team All-ACC honors. However, North Carolina's defense gave up the fifth-most points per game in the ACC. He recorded 11 tackles in a 30–10 loss to West Virginia in the 2023 Duke's Mayo Bowl. He took on further responsibility in his senior year in 2024, being asked to fill not just NFL draftee Cedric Gray's position on the field but his mentorship role in the locker room. He started 12 games and recorded 76 tackles with 1.5 for loss, 0.5 sacks, and one interception, being named All-ACC honorable mention. He did not play in the 2024 Fenway Bowl in order to prepare for the NFL draft.

== Professional career ==
Pre-draft measurables
| Height | Weight | Arm length | Hand span | Wingspan | 40-yard dash | 10-yard split | 20-yard split | 20-yard shuttle | Three-cone drill | Vertical jump | Broad jump | Bench press |
|---|---|---|---|---|---|---|---|---|---|---|---|---|
| 5 ft 11 3/8 in (1.81 m) | 237 lb (108 kg) | 30 5/8 in (0.78 m) | 9 1/8 in (0.23 m) | 6 ft 3 5/8 in (1.92 m) | 4.73 s | 1.59 s | 2.81 s | 4.46 s | 7.38 s | 37.0 in (0.94 m) | 9 ft 7 in (2.92 m) | 13 reps |
All values from NFL Combine/Pro Day

=== Chicago Bears ===
Echols signed with the Chicago Bears as an undrafted free agent on May 8, 2025. He was waived on August 25 and re-signed to the practice squad two days later. On September 1, Echols was waived from the practice squad.

=== Houston Texans ===
On December 23, 2025, Echols was signed to the Houston Texans' practice squad.

=== Seattle Seahawks ===
On August 7, 2026, Echols signed with the Seattle Seahawks. He was waived by Seattle the following day. Echols re-signed with Seattle on August 17. He was waived/injured by the team on August 30. On September 5, Echols was waived by the Seahawks with an injury settlement.
