= Josh Downs =

American football player (born 2001)

No. 12 – Kansas City Chiefs
- Positions: Wide receiver, punt returner
- Roster status: Active

Personal information
- Born: August 12, 2001 (age 25); Suwanee, Georgia, U.S.
- Listed height: 5 ft 9 in (1.75 m)
- Listed weight: 171 lb (78 kg)

Career information
- High school: North Gwinnett (Suwanee)
- College: North Carolina (2020–2022)
- NFL draft: 2023: 3rd round, 79th overall pick

Career history
- Indianapolis Colts (2023–2026); Kansas City Chiefs (2026–present)

Awards and highlights
- 2× First-team All-ACC (2021, 2022)

Career NFL statistics as of Week 10, 2026
- Receptions: 235
- Receiving yards: 2,547
- Receiving touchdowns: 13
- Stats at Pro Football Reference

Joshua Downs (born August 12, 2001) is an American professional football wide receiver and punt returner for the Kansas City Chiefs of the National Football League (NFL). Downs played college football for the North Carolina Tar Heels and was selected by the Colts in the third round of the 2023 NFL draft.

== Early life ==
Downs was born on August 12, 2001, in Suwanee, Georgia, and attended North Gwinnett High School. During his high school career he had 187 receptions for 3,019 yards and 32 touchdowns. He was selected to play in the 2020 All-American Bowl. He committed to the University of North Carolina at Chapel Hill to play college football.

== College career ==
=== Freshman ===
As a true freshman at North Carolina in 2020, Downs appeared in 10 games. Playing primarily on special teams, he had seven receptions for 119 yards and three touchdowns. The first touchdown reception of his college career came against N.C. State in Carolina's 48–21 victory. His breakout performance came in the Orange Bowl, where he filled in for Dyami Brown, who, along with Javonte Williams, Michael Carter, and Chazz Surratt, had opted out of the bowl to prepare for the NFL Draft. Downs caught four passes for 92 yards and two touchdowns, including a 75-yard touchdown on a broken play that gave the Tar Heels a 27–20 lead early in the fourth quarter. He was the team's leading receiver in the 41–27 loss to Texas A&M.

=== Sophomore ===
Heading into the 2021 season, Downs was projected to be the team's number one receiver. In the season-opening loss against Virginia Tech, Downs caught eight passes for 123 yards and a touchdown as the Tar Heels failed to mount a successful second half comeback. Two weeks later against Virginia, he caught eight passes for 203 receiving yards and two touchdowns, setting a career high in the process. Downs's 203 receiving yards against the Cavaliers were the eighth most in a single game in Tar Heel history. Against Wake Forest, he only caught four passes for 35 yards, both season lows. However, his 35 receiving yards against the Demon Deacons made him just the seventh player in school history to gain 1,000 or more receiving yards in a single season. With eight receptions against Wofford, Downs moved into second place behind Ryan Switzer for most receptions in a single season as a Tar Heel with 90.

In the regular season finale, a 34–30 loss against NC State, Downs broke both Switzer's single season receptions record and Hakeem Nicks' single season receiving yards record. He recorded three more catches in the Duke's Mayo Bowl loss to South Carolina, finishing his record-breaking 2021 season with 101 catches for 1,335 yards and eight touchdowns.

=== Junior ===
Solidified as the Tar Heels' top receiver after his record-setting sophomore season, Downs was once again a featured piece in the Tar Heel offense. He was named to the preseason All-ACC team at the wide receiver and specialist (punt returner) positions, and was selected to the preseason AP All-American second-team at the wide receiver position.

In the season opener against FAMU, Downs recorded nine catches for 78 yards and two touchdowns. On his final catch of the game, Downs was injured and missed the next two games against Appalachian State and Georgia State. He returned against Notre Dame, and caught five passes for 32 yards and two touchdowns in the Tar Heels' 45–32 loss. Against Miami, Downs caught another touchdown pass, moving him into a tie for tenth place all time in Carolina history with 16 receiving touchdowns. He continued to post solid statistics the rest of the regular season, recording four games with 11-plus receptions, and recording another 1,000 yard receiving season. Against Wake Forest, he caught three touchdown passes, moving him to second all-time behind Quinshad Davis for UNC career touchdown receptions with 22. In what was his final game as a Tar Heel, the 2022 ACC Championship Game against Clemson, Downs caught 11 passes for 100 yards in the 39–10 loss to the Tigers.

Downs finished his Carolina career with 2,483 receiving yards (the fourth most in school history), 202 career receptions (third most at UNC), and multiple school records at the wide receiver position. He declared for the NFL draft following conference championship week, opting out of the Holiday Bowl in the process.

=== College statistics ===
Year	Team	GP	Rec	Yds	Avg	TD
2020	North Carolina	10	7	119	17.0	3
2021	North Carolina	13	101	1,335	13.2	8
2022	North Carolina	11	94	1,029	10.9	11
Career		34	202	2,483	12.3	22

== Professional career ==
Pre-draft measurables
Height	Weight	Arm length	Hand span	Wingspan	40-yard dash	10-yard split	20-yard split	20-yard shuttle	Three-cone drill	Vertical jump	Broad jump
5 ft 8 3/4 in (1.75 m)	171 lb (78 kg)	30 3/8 in (0.77 m)	9 1/4 in (0.23 m)	6 ft 1 3/8 in (1.86 m)	4.48 s	1.49 s	2.53 s	4.15 s	6.75 s	38.5 in (0.98 m)	10 ft 11 in (3.33 m)
All values from NFL Combine/Pro Day

=== Indianapolis Colts ===
Downs was selected by the Indianapolis Colts in the third round, 79th overall, of the 2023 NFL draft. The Colts previously obtained the 79th overall pick in a trade that sent Carson Wentz to the Washington Commanders. In Week 6, against the Jaguars, he scored his first professional touchdown on a two-yard reception from Gardner Minshew. In Week 7, against the Browns, he had five receptions for 125 yards and a touchdown in the 39–38 loss. He finished his rookie season second on the team in receiving and seventh among all rookies with 68 catches for 771 yards and two touchdowns.

In Week 8 of the 2024 season, Downs had four receptions for 109 yards and a touchdown against the Houston Texans. In the 2024 season, Downs had 72 receptions for 803 yards and five touchdowns. In the 2025 season, he had 58 receptions for 566 yards and four touchdowns.

=== Kansas City Chiefs ===
At the 2026 trade deadline, the Colts traded Downs and a seventh-round pick to the Kansas City Chiefs in exchange for a fourth and fifth-round pick.

== NFL career statistics ==
Legend
**Bold**	Career high

Year	Team	Games		Receiving					Rushing					Punt returns					Kick returns					Fumbles	
Year	Team	GP	GS	Rec	Yds	Avg	Lng	TD	Att	Yds	Avg	Lng	TD	Ret	Yds	Avg	Lng	TD	Ret	Yds	Avg	Lng	TD	Fum	Lost
2023	IND	17	9	68	771	**11.3**	59	2	0	0	0.0	0	0	6	63	**10.5**	14	0	**2**	**24**	**12.0**	**17**	0	0	0
2024	IND	14	8	**72**	**803**	11.2	**69**	**5**	1	**12**	**12.0**	**13**	0	**16**	**161**	10.1	23	0	0	0	0.0	0	0	0	0
2025	IND	16	11	58	566	9.8	34	4	**2**	-2	-1.0	3	0	8	68	8.5	**24**	0	0	0	0.0	0	0	**1**	**1**
2026	IND	9	7	33	354	10.7	24	1	1	7	7.0	7	0	2	20	10.0	20	0	0	0	0.0	0	0	0	0
2026	KAN	1	0	4	53	13.3	21	1	0	0	0.0	0	0	3	10	3.3	11	0	0	0	0.0	0	0	0	0
Career		57	35	235	2,547	10.8	69	13	4	17	4.3	13	0	35	322	9.2	24	0	2	24	12.0	17	0	1	1

== Personal life ==
Downs's father, Gary, played college football for NC State and is now an assistant coach. His uncle, Dré Bly, also played with the Tar Heels and 11 years in the NFL. His younger brother, Caleb, is a safety who played his freshman season at Alabama before transferring to Ohio State and was later drafted by the Dallas Cowboys.
