= Cedric Gray =

American football player (born 2002)

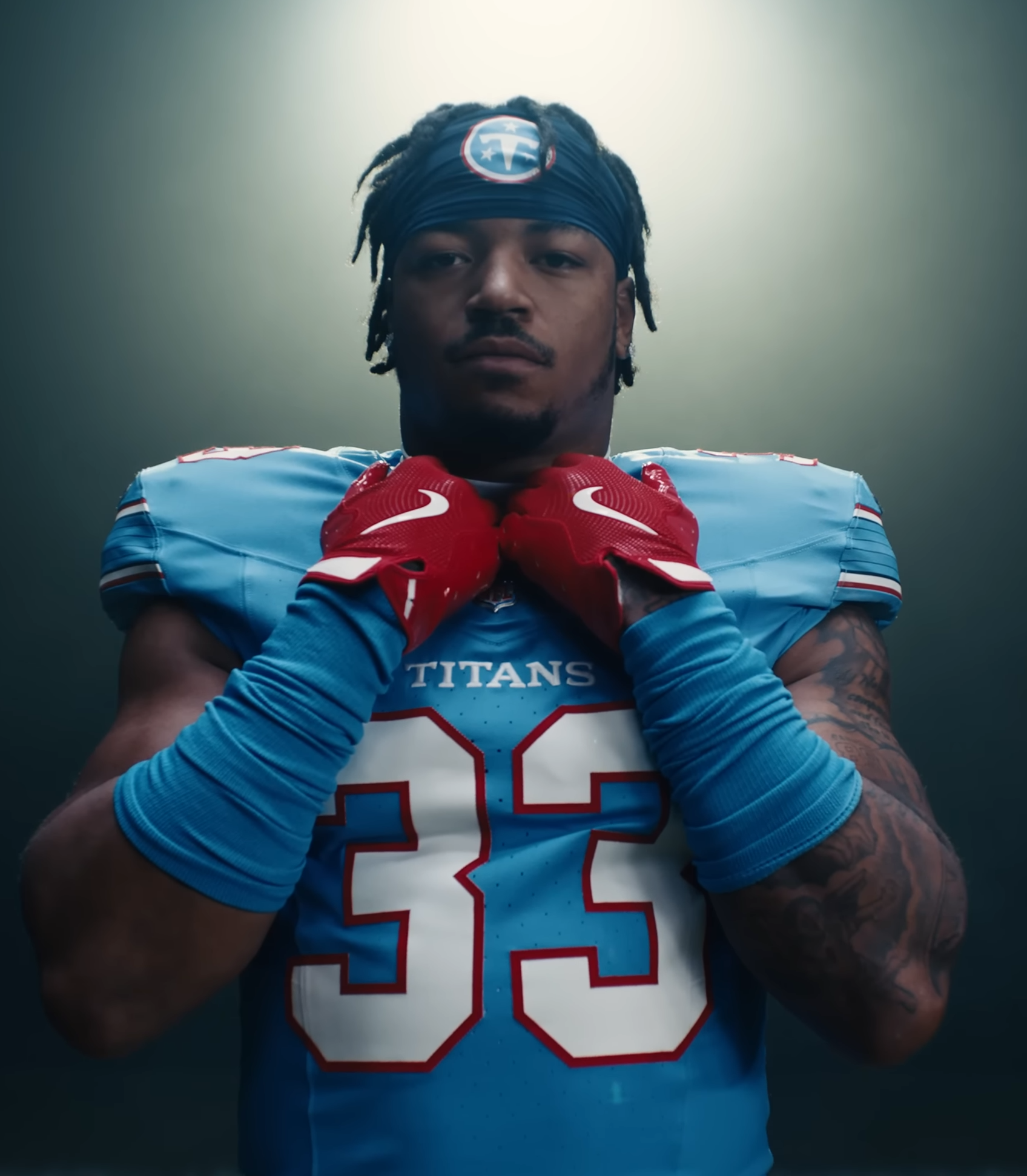
- Gray with the Tennessee Titans in 2026

No. 33 – Tennessee Titans
- Position: Linebacker
- Roster status: Active

Personal information
- Born: October 30, 2002 (age 24); Fort Washington, Maryland, U.S.
- Listed height: 6 ft 2 in (1.88 m)
- Listed weight: 240 lb (109 kg)

Career information
- High school: Ardrey Kell (Charlotte, North Carolina)
- College: North Carolina (2020–2023)
- NFL draft: 2024: 4th round, 106th overall pick

Career history
- Tennessee Titans (2024–present)

Awards and highlights
- Second-team All-American (2022); 2× First-team All-ACC (2022, 2023)

Career NFL statistics as of 2025
- Total tackles: 186
- Sacks: 1
- Fumble recoveries: 2
- Pass deflections: 4
- Stats at Pro Football Reference

Cedric Malik Gray (born October 30, 2002) is an American professional football linebacker for the Tennessee Titans of the National Football League (NFL). He played college football for the North Carolina Tar Heels.

== Early life ==
Born in Fort Washington, Maryland, Gray attended Fort Washington Forest Elementary before relocating to Charlotte, North Carolina in 2013 attending Community House MS and Ardrey Kell High School. As a wide receiver, he brought in 143 receptions for 2,467 yards and 27 touchdowns, while also rushing for 70 yards and a touchdown. As a linebacker on defense, he tallied 131 tackles with 12 being for a loss, 4.5 sacks, two pass deflections, three interceptions, a fumble recovery, and a forced fumble. Gray committed to play college football at the University of North Carolina over other schools such as Akron, Appalachian State, and Marshall.

== College career ==
As a freshman in 2020, Gray recorded three tackles. Gray would break out the following year, earning a starting spot at linebacker for the Tar Heels in 2021. In week seven of that season, Gray recorded six tackles with one for a loss, and two interceptions, including the interception to clinch the victory over Miami. For his performance, he was named the ACC linebacker of the week. In the team's bowl game, Gray posted 13 tackles with two for a loss, but the Tar Heels fell to South Carolina. Gray finished the 2021 season with 99 tackles with six going for a loss, 2.5 sacks, three pass deflections, two interceptions, and a fumble recovery.

Gray got off to a strong start to the 2022 season, racking up 13 tackles and an interception in the Tar Heels' thrilling 63–61 win over Appalachian State. In week five, Gray totaled eight tackles and an interception in a 41–10 win over Virginia Tech, 41–10. In week ten, Gray racked up 16 tackles as the Tar Heels beat Virginia, 31–28. In the 2022 Holiday Bowl, Gray recorded eight tackles with two for a loss, and a pass deflection, but North Carolina fell to Oregon, 28–27. Gray finished the 2022 season with 145 tackles with 12 being for a loss, a sack, six pass deflections, two interceptions, two fumble recoveries, and three forced fumbles, earning first team All ACC honors for his performance. He was also named a second team All-American by Sporting News.

Gray was named to the preseason first team All-ACC heading into the 2023 season, and would live up to that projection. He would tally 121 total tackles (64 solo), five sacks, two forced fumbles, and another interception en route to his second-straight first team all-conference nod. He would declare for the 2024 NFL draft following the conclusion of the regular season.

== Professional career ==
Pre-draft measurables
Height	Weight	Arm length	Hand span	Wingspan	40-yard dash	10-yard split	20-yard split	20-yard shuttle	Three-cone drill	Vertical jump	Broad jump	Bench press
6 ft 1 1/2 in (1.87 m)	234 lb (106 kg)	32 1/2 in (0.83 m)	9 in (0.23 m)	6 ft 6 3/8 in (1.99 m)	4.64 s	1.59 s	2.67 s	4.54 s	7.19 s	35.5 in (0.90 m)	10 ft 0 in (3.05 m)	17 reps
All values from NFL Combine/Pro Day

Gray was selected in the fourth round with the 106th overall pick in the 2024 NFL draft by the Tennessee Titans. He was placed on injured reserve on August 29, 2024, and would miss the first half of the season. Gray was activated on October 29. He made his NFL debut on special teams for the Titans during Week 12's win against the Houston Texans. He made 15 tackles during Week 15's loss against the Indianapolis Colts. He finished his rookie season with 22 total tackles. In 2025, Gray emerged as a full-time starter for the Titans. Gray ended the season with a team leading 164 tackles, a tally which gave him the fourth highest total in the NFL for the 2025 season.

== NFL career statistics ==
Legend
**Bold**	Career high

=== Regular season ===
Year	Team	Games		Tackles					Interceptions						Fumbles				
Year	Team	GP	GS	Cmb	Solo	Ast	Sck	TFL	Int	Yds	Avg	Lng	TD	PD	FF	Fmb	FR	Yds	TD
2024	TEN	7	0	22	13	9	0.0	0	0	0	0.0	0	0	0	0	0	0	0	0
2025	TEN	16	16	**164**	**97**	**67**	**1.0**	**7**	0	0	0.0	0	0	**4**	0	0	**2**	**19**	0
Career		23	16	186	110	76	1.0	7	0	0	0.0	0	0	4	0	0	2	19	0
