= Antoine Green =

American football player (born 1999)

No. 80, 18
- Position: Wide receiver

Personal information
- Born: November 15, 1999 (age 26); Rockledge, Florida, U.S.
- Listed height: 6 ft 2 in (1.88 m)
- Listed weight: 200 lb (91 kg)

Career information
- High school: Rockledge
- College: North Carolina (2018–2022)
- NFL draft: 2023: 7th round, 219th overall pick

Career history
- Detroit Lions (2023–2024)

Awards and highlights
- Third-team All-ACC (2022)

Career NFL statistics
- Receptions: 1
- Receiving yards: 2
- Stats at Pro Football Reference

Antoine Green (born November 15, 1999) is an American former professional football player who was a wide receiver in the National Football League (NFL). He played college football for the North Carolina Tar Heels.

== College career ==
As a freshman at North Carolina in 2018, Green appeared in five games at wide receiver and on special teams, and posted four receptions for 45 yards. On October 20, 2018, he suffered a season-ending leg injury in an overtime loss to Syracuse. As a sophomore in 2019, he appeared in 10 games and made two starts at wide receiver, posting eight receptions for 217 yards and two touchdowns. As a junior in 2020, Green appeared in 11 games, and made one start at wide receiver and on special teams.

As a senior in 2021, he started all 13 games at wide receiver, and ranked second on the team in receptions (31), receiving yards (612) and receiving touchdowns (5). He ranked second in the Atlantic Coast Conference (ACC), and 12th nationally, averaging 19.7 yards per reception.

He suffered a collarbone injury in a preseason scrimmage and missed the first three games of the season. As a fifth-year senior in 2022, he appeared in nine games, and made eight starts at wide receiver, and ranked second on the team in receptions (43), yards receiving (798), receiving touchdowns (7) and receiving yards per game (88.67). Following the season he was named third-team All-ACC.

== Professional career ==
Pre-draft measurables
Height	Weight	Arm length	Hand span	40-yard dash	10-yard split	20-yard split	20-yard shuttle	Three-cone drill	Vertical jump	Broad jump
6 ft 1 3/4 in (1.87 m)	199 lb (90 kg)	32 1/8 in (0.82 m)	9 in (0.23 m)	4.47 s	1.54 s	2.58 s	4.27 s	6.99 s	33.5 in (0.85 m)	10 ft 3 in (3.12 m)
All values from NFL Combine

Green was selected by the Detroit Lions in the seventh round, 219th overall, of the 2023 NFL draft.

Green was waived with an injury designation on August 12, 2024.

On April 29, 2025, Green was waived by the Lions. Green announced his retirement from professional football on August 28, 2025.
