= Bryson Nesbit =

American football player (born 2002)

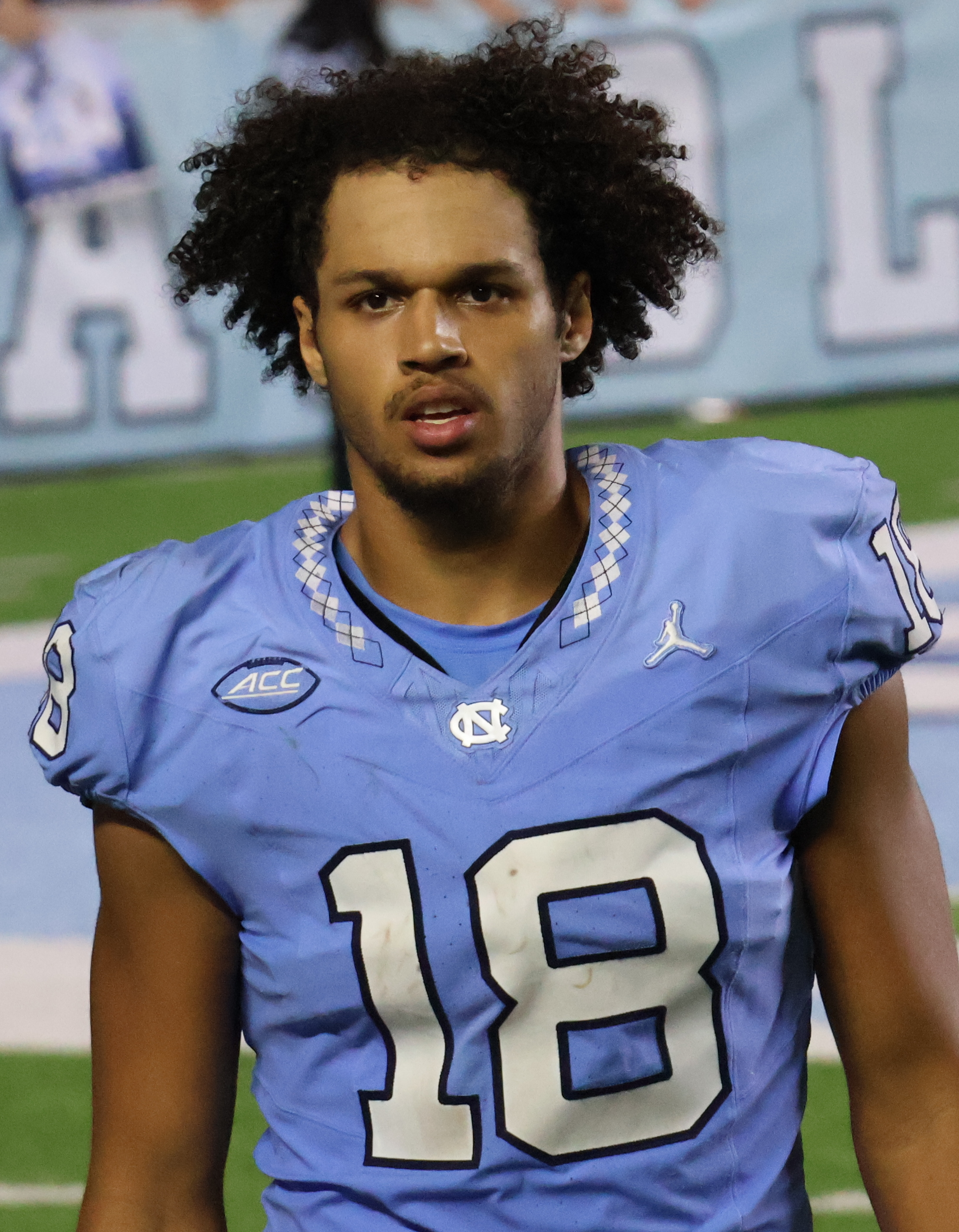
- Nesbit with North Carolina in 2024

Columbus Aviators
- Position: Tight end
- Roster status: Unsigned draft pick

Personal information
- Born: September 25, 2002 (age 24); Charlotte, North Carolina, U.S.
- Listed height: 6 ft 5 in (1.96 m)
- Listed weight: 228 lb (103 kg)

Career information
- High school: South Mecklenburg (Charlotte)
- College: North Carolina (2021–2024)
- NFL draft: 2025: undrafted

Career history
- Minnesota Vikings (2025–2026)*; Columbus Aviators (2027-present)
- * Offseason or practice squad member only

Awards and highlights
- First-team All-ACC (2023)
- Stats at Pro Football Reference

Bryson Nesbit (born September 25, 2002) is an American professional football tight end. He played college football for the North Carolina Tar Heels.

== Early life ==
Nesbit grew up in Charlotte, North Carolina and attended South Mecklenburg High School. He was rated a four-star recruit and committed to play college football at North Carolina (UNC) over offers from UCLA, Ole Miss, South Carolina, and Virginia Tech.

== College career ==
Nebsit played in 11 games during his freshman season with the Tar Heels at the University of North Carolina at Chapel Hill and finished the season with seven receptions 157 yards and one touchdown. He was named honorable mention All-Atlantic Coast Conference (All-ACC) as a sophomore after catching 35 passes for 507 yards and four touchdowns. His junior season would prove to be his best and most effective season in Chapel Hill to date. He caught 41 passes for 585 yards and 5 touchdowns, earning first team All-ACC honors in the process.

=== Statistics ===
Year	Team	G	Rec	Yards	Avg	TDs
2021	North Carolina	11	7	154	22.0	1
2022	North Carolina	14	35	507	14.5	4
2023	North Carolina	12	41	585	14.3	5
Career		37	83	1,246	15.0	10

== Professional career ==
Pre-draft measurables
Height	Weight	Arm length	Hand span	Wingspan	40-yard dash	10-yard split	20-yard split	20-yard shuttle	Three-cone drill	Vertical jump	Broad jump
6 ft 5 in (1.96 m)	238 lb (108 kg)	31 3/4 in (0.81 m)	9 3/4 in (0.25 m)	6 ft 5 3/8 in (1.97 m)	4.88 s	1.61 s	2.83 s	4.48 s	7.28 s	32.5 in (0.83 m)	9 ft 4 in (2.84 m)
All values from NFL Combine/Pro Day

Nesbit signed with the Minnesota Vikings as an undrafted free agent on April 26, 2025. He was waived on August 26 as part of final roster cuts. Nesbit was re-signed to the practice squad the following day. He signed a reserve/future contract with Minnesota on January 5, 2026.

On August 30, 2026, Nesbit was waived by Minnesota with an injury designation as a part of final roster cuts. On October 28, he was re-signed to the practice squad and released five days later.

== Personal life ==
Nesbit's father, Jamar Nesbit, played college football at South Carolina and in the NFL for 11 seasons as an offensive lineman. His mother, Tara, played soccer at South Carolina.
