= Tony Grimes =

American football player (born 2002)

Profile
- Position: Cornerback
- Class: Senior

Personal information
- Born: April 8, 2002 (age 24); Virginia Beach, Virginia, U.S.
- Listed height: 6 ft 0 in (1.83 m)
- Listed weight: 195 lb (88 kg)

Career information
- High school: Princess Anne (Virginia Beach, Virginia)
- College: North Carolina (2020–2022); Texas A&M (2023); UNLV (2024); Purdue (2025)

Awards and highlights
- USA Today All-American (2019)
- Stats at ESPN

Tony Grimes (born April 8, 2002) is an American college football cornerback, who is currently a free agent. He had played for three seasons at the University of North Carolina at Chapel Hill before transferring to Texas A&M after the 2022 season. Played played for the Purdue Boilermakers in 2025.

== Early life ==
Grimes attended Princess Anne High School in Virginia Beach, Virginia. He was selected to the Under Armour All-America Game. A five-star recruit, he committed to North Carolina to play college football, and reclassified from the class of 2021 to 2020.

== College career ==
As a true freshman at North Carolina in 2020, Grimes started four of 12 games, recording 14 tackles, one interception and one sack. As a sophomore in 2021, he started all 13 games and had 47 tackles.

After the 2022 season, he entered the NCAA transfer portal and committed to Texas A&M, which had recently lost four cornerbacks to the transfer portal, for the 2023 season.

On January 1, 2024, Grimes announced that he would be entering the transfer portal for the second time. On January 7, he announced that he would be transferring to Michigan State. However on January 14, he announced that he would flip his commitment to UNLV after an admissions issue with Michigan State.

== Professional career ==
Pre-draft measurables
Height	Weight	Arm length	Hand span	Wingspan	40-yard dash	10-yard split	20-yard split	20-yard shuttle	Three-cone drill	Vertical jump	Broad jump	Bench press
6 ft 0 1/4 in (1.84 m)	195 lb (88 kg)	33 in (0.84 m)	8 5/8 in (0.22 m)	6 ft 8 1/4 in (2.04 m)	4.53 s	1.69 s	2.71 s	4.38 s	7.10 s	38.0 in (0.97 m)	10 ft 2 in (3.10 m)	15 reps
All values from Pro Day
