= Noah Taylor (Canadian football) =

American gridiron football player (born 1999)

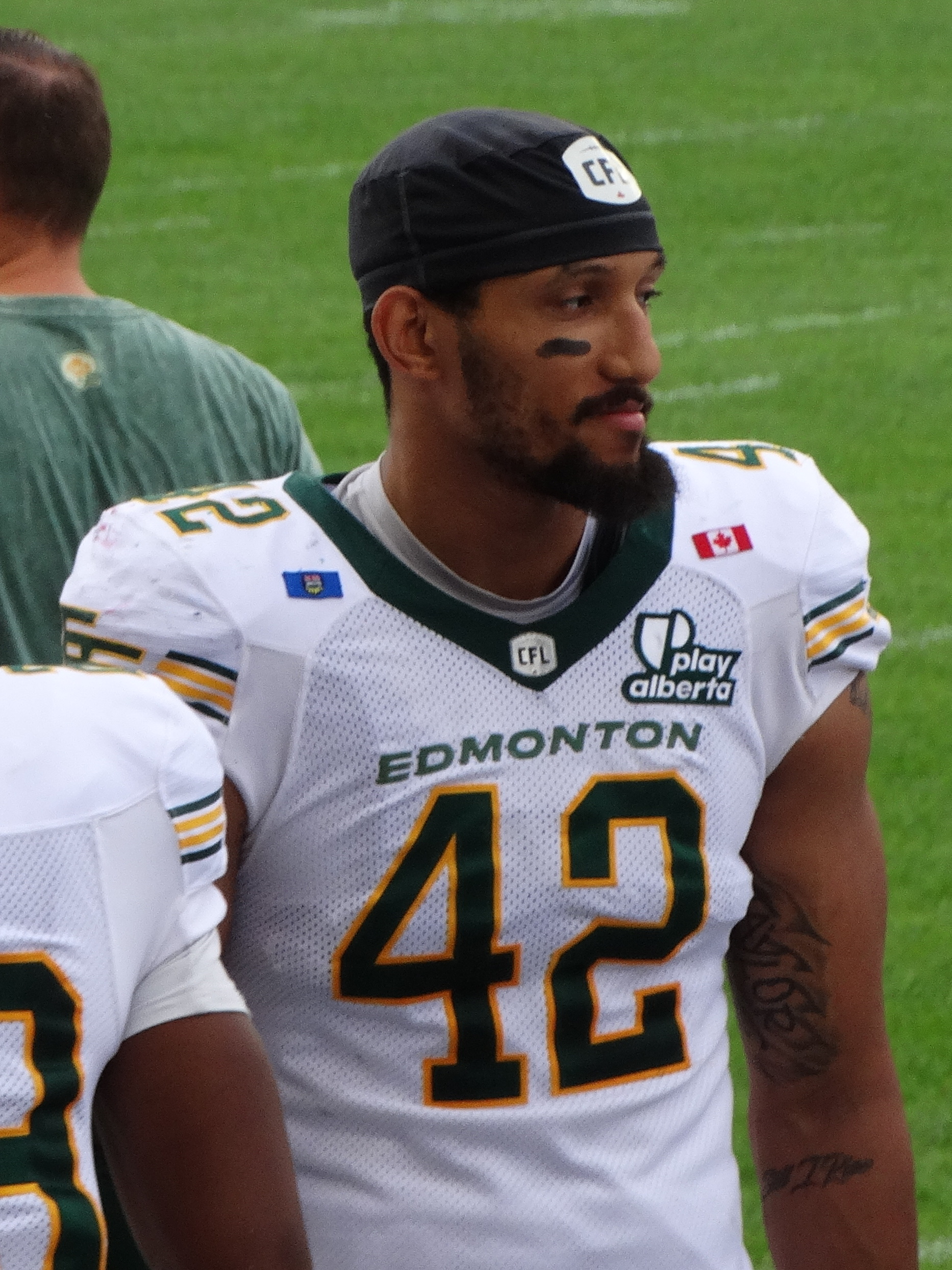
- Taylor with the Edmonton Elks in 2025

No. 42 – Edmonton Elks
- Position: Defensive lineman
- Roster status: Active
- CFL status: American

Personal information
- Born: November 5, 1999 (age 27); Bronx, New York, U.S.
- Listed height: 6 ft 4 in (1.93 m)
- Listed weight: 240 lb (109 kg)

Career information
- High school: The Avalon School (Wheaton, Maryland)
- College: Virginia (2018–2021) North Carolina (2022)

Career history
- Arlington Renegades (2024)*; Edmonton Elks (2024–present)
- * Offseason or practice squad member only

Awards and highlights
- Grey Cup champion (2026)

Career CFL statistics as of 2026
- Games played: 42
- Tackles: 67
- Sacks: 16
- Stats at CFL.ca
- Stats at Pro Football Reference

Noah Taylor (born November 5, 1999) is an American professional football defensive lineman for the Edmonton Elks of the Canadian Football League (CFL). He played college football for the Virginia Cavaliers and North Carolina Tar Heels.

== College career ==
Taylor played college football for the Virginia Cavaliers from 2018 to 2021 and North Carolina Tar Heels in 2022. He played in 44 games at Virginia, recording 170 tackles, including, 30 for loss, 13.5 sacks, three interceptions, ten pass knockdowns, two forced fumbles and one fumble recovery. Taylor returned an interception for a 85-yard touchdown against the Louisville Cardinals, setting a team record for longest interception return by a linebacker.

For his final season, Taylor transferred to North Carolina. In eight games, he made 28 tackles, including six for loss, 3.5 sacks and two pass deflections. Taylor missed the remainder of the season due to a torn ACL he suffered in the game against Pitt on October 29.

== Professional career ==
Pre-draft measurables
Height	Weight	Arm length	Hand span	Wingspan
6 ft 5 in (1.96 m)	239 lb (108 kg)	32 5/8 in (0.83 m)	8 5/8 in (0.22 m)	6 ft 6 7/8 in (2.00 m)
All values from Pro day

=== Arlington Renegades ===
On June 21, 2023, the Arlington Renegades of the XFL claimed the rights to Taylor. He was released on March 21, 2024.

=== Edmonton Elks ===
On July 7, 2024, Taylor signed to the practice roster of the Edmonton Elks of the Canadian Football League (CFL). He was promoted on the active roster on July 18. Taylor played in seven games, starting in four, and made 12 tackles and two sacks.

In 2025, Taylor dressed in 18 games, starting in 10, recording 27 tackles, including two for loss, and four sacks. On December 1, he signed a contract extension with the Elks.

In the week 9 game against the Saskatchewan Roughriders, Taylor was ejected after he accrued two personal foul penalties, the first was for contact with an official and the second was embellishment. He was later fined an undisclosed amount by the CFL.
