= Desmond Evans =

American gridiron football player (born 2002)

No. 98 – Saskatchewan Roughriders
- Position: Defensive lineman
- Roster status: Active
- CFL status: American

Personal information
- Born: August 26, 2002 (age 24)
- Listed height: 6 ft 6 in (1.98 m)
- Listed weight: 255 lb (116 kg)

Career information
- High school: Lee County (Sanford, North Carolina)
- College: North Carolina (2020–2024)
- NFL draft: 2025: undrafted

Career history
- Tennessee Titans (2025)*; Saskatchewan Roughriders (2026–present)
- * Offseason or practice squad member only
- Stats at Pro Football Reference
- Stats at CFL.ca

Desmond Evans (born August 26, 2002) is an American professional football defensive lineman for the Saskatchewan Roughriders of the Canadian Football League (CFL). He played college football for the North Carolina Tar Heels.

== Early life ==
Evans was born on August 26, 2002. He attended Lee County High School in Sanford, North Carolina. As a senior, Evans recorded 76 tackles, with 35 for loss, 11 sacks, three forced fumbles, one fumble recovery and two blocked kicks. On December 18, 2019, he signed a National Letter of Intent to play college football at the University of North Carolina. Evans was a four-star recruit by 247Sports and was ranked 35th in the nation. He also played in the 2020 Under Armour All-America Game.

== College career ==
Evans played college football for the North Carolina Tar Heels from 2020 to 2024 at outside linebacker and defensive end. In 56 games, he had 124 tackles, including 20.5 for loss, nine sacks, seven pass break ups and two fumble recoveries.

== Professional career ==
Pre-draft measurables
Height	Weight	Arm length	Hand span	Wingspan	40-yard dash	10-yard split	20-yard split	20-yard shuttle	Three-cone drill	Vertical jump	Broad jump
6 ft 6 in (1.98 m)	252 lb (114 kg)	32 5/8 in (0.83 m)	9 3/8 in (0.24 m)	6 ft 6 3/4 in (2.00 m)	4.99 s	1.65 s	2.81 s	4.77 s	7.32 s	29.5 in (0.75 m)	9 ft 1 in (2.77 m)
All values from Pro day

=== Tennessee Titans ===
After going unselected in the 2025 NFL draft, Evans signed with the Tennessee Titans as an undrafted free agent. On August 25, he was waived by the team.

=== Saskatchewan Roughriders ===
On January 19, 2026, Evans was signed by the Saskatchewan Roughriders of the Canadian Football League (CFL). After he was released by the Titans, he spent three months in a sales job. The Roughriders called Evans roughly 20 times to get him to come to Saskatchewan for a tryout which he eventually did. He was named a week one starter and had one tackle, sack and pass deflection in his CFL debut against the BC Lions. On September 5, Evans was moved to the practice roster. On October 23, he was elevated to the active roster.
