= Tomari Fox =

American gridiron football player (born 2001)

No. 95 – Edmonton Elks
- Position: Defensive lineman
- Roster status: Active
- CFL status: American

Personal information
- Born: March 24, 2001 (age 25); Lawrenceville, Georgia, U.S.
- Listed height: 6 ft 3 in (1.91 m)
- Listed weight: 300 lb (136 kg)

Career information
- High school: Collins Hill (Suwanee, Georgia)
- College: North Carolina (2019–2023)
- NFL draft: 2024: undrafted

Career history
- Las Vegas Raiders (2024)*; Edmonton Elks (2025–present)
- * Offseason or practice squad member only

Awards and highlights
- Grey Cup champion (2026)

Career CFL statistics as of 2026
- Games played: 13
- Tackles: 11
- Sacks: 1
- Stats at CFL.ca
- Stats at Pro Football Reference

Tomari Fox (born March 24, 2001) is an American professional football defensive lineman for the Edmonton Elks of the Canadian Football League (CFL). He played college football for the North Carolina Tar Heels.

== Early life ==
Fox was born on June 5, 2003, in Lawrenceville, Georgia. He attended Collins Hill High School in Suwanee, Georgia.

== College career ==
Fox played college football for the North Carolina Tar Heels from 2019 to 2023. In 49 games, he had 100 tackles, including 10.5 for loss, 6.5 sacks and one forced fumble. Fox was suspended the entire 2022 season after he consumed a banned substance prior to the 2021 Duke's Mayo Bowl.

== Professional career ==
Pre-draft measurables
Height	Weight	Arm length	Hand span	Wingspan	40-yard dash	10-yard split	20-yard split	20-yard shuttle	Three-cone drill	Vertical jump	Broad jump	Bench press
6 ft 2 in (1.88 m)	288 lb (131 kg)	32 3/8 in (0.82 m)	9 3/8 in (0.24 m)	6 ft 6 5/8 in (2.00 m)	5.16 s	1.75 s	2.90 s	4.47 s	7.63 s	31 in (0.79 m)	9 ft 3 in (2.82 m)	22 reps
All values from Pro day

=== Las Vegas Raiders ===
After not being selected in the 2024 NFL draft, Fox signed with the Las Vegas Raiders of the National Football League (NFL) as an undrafted free agent. On August 6, he was waived and placed on the injured reserve. On March 7, 2025, Fox was released by the team.

=== Edmonton Elks ===
On April 10, 2025, the Edmonton Elks of the Canadian Football League (CFL) signed Fox. He played in the team's first three games and recorded one tackle. On July 1, Fox was placed on the injured list after suffering an ankle injury. He dressed in the first game of the 2026 season before hew was placed on the one-game injured list on June 19, 2026. On June 23, Fox was elevated to the active roster. On August 13, he was placed on the six-game injured list with an arm injury.
