= 2022 Holiday Bowl =

Postseason college football bowl game

- 43rd Holiday Bowl
Oregon Ducks	North Carolina Tar Heels
(9–3)	(9–4)
Pac-12	ACC
28	27
Head coach: Dan Lanning	Head coach: Mack Brown
AP / Coaches / CFP; 15 / 14 / 15	AP / Coaches / CFP; NR / 25 / NR
	1	2	3	4	Total
Oregon	7	7	0	14	28
North Carolina	7	14	0	6	27
- Date: December 28, 2022
- Season: 2022
- Stadium: Petco Park
- Location: San Diego, California
- MVP: Bucky Irving (RB, Oregon) & Mase Funa (LB, Oregon)
- Favorite: Oregon by 13
- Referee: Mark Kluczynski (Big Ten)
- Attendance: 36,242
- Payout: US$6,532,700

United States TV coverage
- Network: Fox
- Announcers: Gus Johnson, Joel Klatt and Jenny Taft

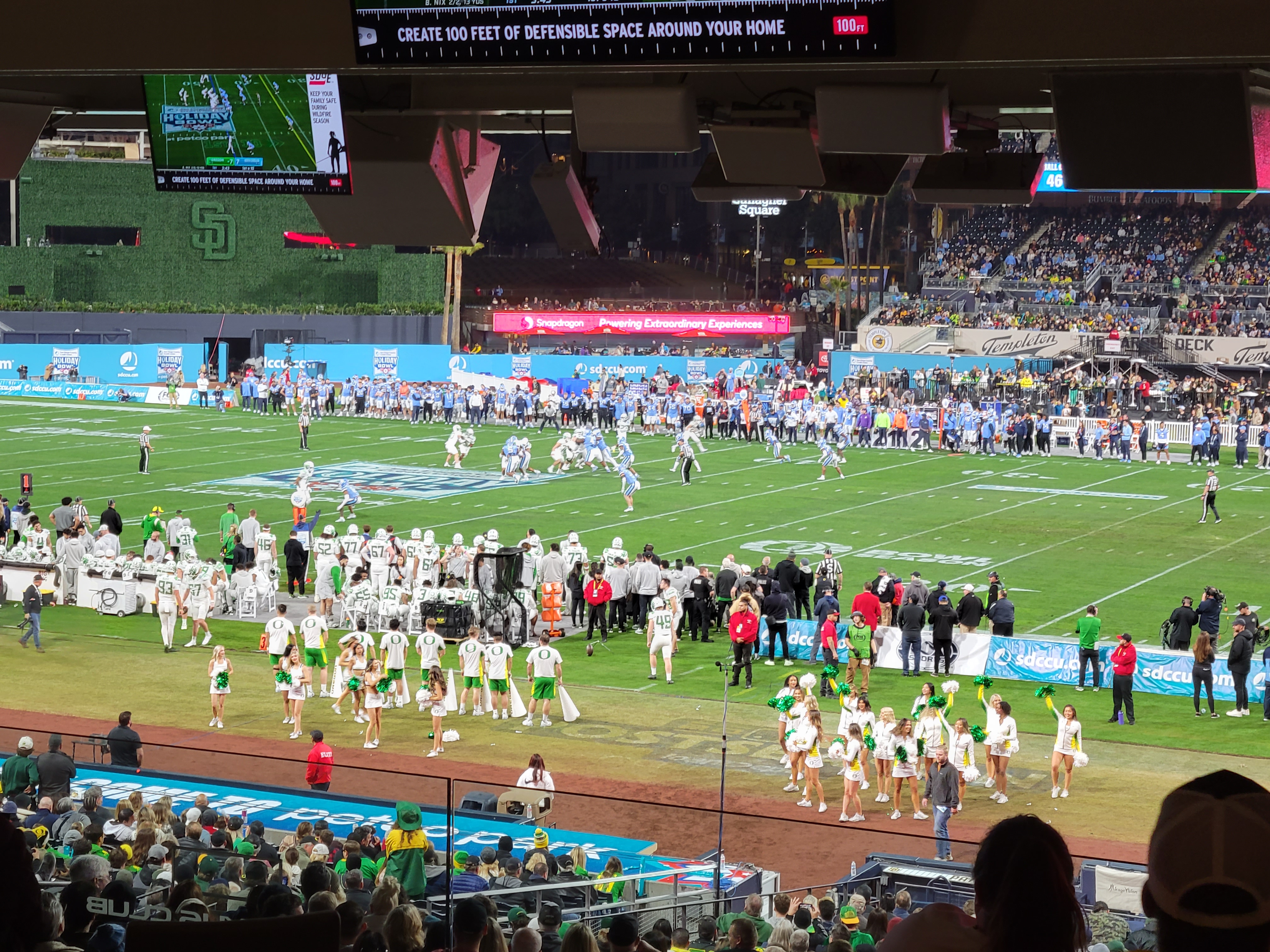

The 2022 Holiday Bowl was a college football bowl game played on December 28, 2022, at Petco Park in San Diego, California. The 43rd annual Holiday Bowl, the game featured the Oregon Ducks from the Pac-12 Conference and the North Carolina Tar Heels from the Atlantic Coast Conference. The game began at 5:06 p.m. PST and was aired on Fox. It was one of the 2022–23 bowl games concluding the 2022 FBS football season. Sponsored by San Diego County Credit Union, the game was officially known as the San Diego County Credit Union Holiday Bowl.

This was the first Holiday Bowl staged since the 2019 edition, as the 2020 and 2021 editions were canceled due to impact from the COVID-19 pandemic.

== Teams ==
Based on conference tie-ins, the game featured teams from the Atlantic Coast Conference and the Pac-12 Conference. This was the first meeting between the two teams. This was Oregon's fourth appearance in the Holiday Bowl, where they have gone 2-1 in previous appearances in 2000 (won against Texas Longhorns, also coached by Mack Brown, 35–30), 2005 (lost against Oklahoma Sooners 14–17), and 2008 (won against Oklahoma State Cowboys 42–31). This was North Carolina's first appearance in the Holiday Bowl.

=== Oregon Ducks ===
The Ducks entered the game ranked 15th in the AP Poll (15th in the CFP Poll), with a 9–3 record (7–2 in conference). The Ducks finished in third place in the Pac-12. Oregon was 3–3 against ranked teams.

=== North Carolina Tar Heels ===
The Tar Heels entered the game with a 9–4 record (6–2 in conference). The Tar Heels finished in first place in the ACC's Coastal Division, but lost in the 2022 ACC Championship Game to the Clemson Tigers, 39–10. North Carolina was 0–1 against ranked teams.

== Game summary ==
2022 San Diego County Credit Union Holiday Bowl

Quarter	1	2	3	4	Total
No. 15 Oregon	7	7	0	14	28
North Carolina	7	14	0	6	27

at Petco Park • San Diego, California

- Date: Wednesday, December 28, 2022
- Game time: 5:00 p.m. PST
- Game weather: Clear • Temperature: 59 °F (15 °C) • Wind: 8 mph (13 km/h) west
- Game attendance: 36,242
- Referee: Mark Kluczynski
- TV announcers (Fox): Gus Johnson, Joel Klatt and Jenny Taft
- Box score

Scoring summary

Quarter	Time	Drive			Team	Scoring information	Score	
Quarter	Time	Plays	Yards	TOP	Team	Scoring information	Oregon	North Carolina
1	11:05	6	54	2:25	Oregon	Bucky Irving 2-yard touchdown run, Camden Lewis kick good	7	0
1	4:37	12	44	6:28	North Carolina	Andre Green Jr. 6-yard touchdown reception from Drake Maye, Noah Burnette kick good	7	7
2	9:13	4	80	1:36	Oregon	Bucky Irving 66-yard touchdown run, Camden Lewis kick good	14	7
2	4:43	10	75	4:39	North Carolina	Bryson Nesbit 14-yard touchdown reception from Drake Maye, Noah Burnette kick good	14	14
2	0:26	1	49	0:09	North Carolina	Kobe Paysour 49-yard touchdown reception from Drake Maye, Noah Burnette kick good	14	21
4	9:13	10	41	5:29	North Carolina	19-yard field goal by Noah Burnette	14	24
4	6:58	5	61	2:15	Oregon	Troy Franklin 6-yard touchdown reception from Bo Nix, Camden Lewis kick good	21	24
4	2:29	11	43	4:29	North Carolina	44-yard field goal by Noah Burnette	21	27
4	0:19	8	79	2:10	Oregon	Chase Cota 6-yard touchdown reception from Bo Nix, Camden Lewis kick good	28	27
"TOP" = time of possession. For other American football terms, see Glossary of American football.							28	27

== Statistics ==
Team statistical comparison
Statistic	Oregon	North Carolina
First downs	22	20
First downs rushing	7	7
First downs passing	12	11
First downs penalty	3	2
Third down efficiency	6–12	5–15
Fourth down efficiency	1–2	4–4
Total plays–net yards	62–414	69–322
Rushing attempts–net yards	32–209	34–116
Yards per rush	6.5	3.4
Yards passing	205	206
Pass completions–attempts	23–30	18–35
Interceptions thrown	1	0
Punt returns–total yards	1–4	1–16
Kickoff returns–total yards	4–106	3–106
Punts–average yardage	2–43.5	3–44.7
Fumbles–lost	0–0	1–0
Penalties–yards	5–39	5–55
Time of possession	27:11	32:49

Oregon statistics
Ducks passing
	C–A	Yds	TD–INT
Bo Nix	23–30	205	2–1
Ducks rushing
	Car	Yds	TD
Bucky Irving	13	149	2
Jordan James	3	27	0
Noah Whittington	11	27	0
Bo Nix	5	6	0
Ducks receiving
	Rec	Yds	TD
Terrance Ferguson	5	84	0
Chase Cota	3	42	1
Noah Whittington	5	37	0
Troy Franklin	5	24	1
Kris Hutson	2	10	0
Patrick Herbert	1	7	0
Cam McCormick	1	2	0
Bucky Irving	1	-1	0

North Carolina statistics
Tar Heels passing
	C–A	Yds	TD–INT
Drake Maye	18–35	206	3–0
Tar Heels rushing
	Car	Yds	TD
Elijah Green	17	50	0
Drake Maye	12	45	0
D.J. Jones	2	9	0
George Pettaway	1	4	0
Omarion Hampton	2	4	0
John Copenhaver	0	4	0
Tar Heels receiving
	Rec	Yds	TD
Kobe Paysour	7	98	1
Bryson Nesbit	3	37	1
Andre Greene Jr.	3	26	1
John Copenhaver	3	24	0
J.J. Jones	1	11	0
D.J. Jones	1	10	0
