= 2022 ACC Championship Game =

Postseason college football bowl game

2022 Subway ACC Championship Game
- Conference Championship
Clemson Tigers	North Carolina Tar Heels
(10–2)	(9–3)
39	10
Head coach: Dabo Swinney	Head coach: Mack Brown
AP / Coaches / CFP; 10 / 11 / 9	AP / Coaches / CFP; 24 / 22 / 23
	1	2	3	4	Total
Clemson	14	10	15	0	39
North Carolina	7	3	0	0	10
- Date: December 3, 2022
- Season: 2022
- Stadium: Bank of America Stadium
- Location: Charlotte, North Carolina
- MVP: Cade Klubnik (QB, Clemson)
- Favorite: Clemson by 7.5
- Referee: Mike Roche
- Attendance: 64,115

United States TV coverage
- Network: ABC; ESPN Radio
- Announcers: ABC: Sean McDonough (play-by-play), Todd Blackledge (analyst) and Molly McGrath (sideline reporter); ESPN Radio: Sean Kelley, Tom Ramsey and Kelsey Riggs

International TV coverage
- Network: ESPN Brazil
- Announcers: Thiago Alves (play-by-play) and Weinny Eirado (analyst)

2022 Atlantic Coast Conference football standings
	Conf.			Overall
Team	W		L	W		L
Atlantic Division
No. 13 Clemson xy$	8	–	0	11	–	3
No. 11 Florida State	5	–	3	10	–	3
Syracuse	4	–	4	7	–	6
Louisville	4	–	4	8	–	5
NC State	4	–	4	8	–	5
Wake Forest	3	–	5	8	–	5
Boston College	2	–	6	3	–	9
Coastal Division
North Carolina xy	6	–	2	9	–	5
No. 22 Pittsburgh	5	–	3	9	–	4
Duke	5	–	3	9	–	4
Georgia Tech	4	–	4	5	–	7
Miami (FL)	3	–	5	5	–	7
Virginia	1	–	6	3	–	7
Virginia Tech	1	–	6	3	–	8
Championship: Clemson 39, North Carolina 10
$ – Conference champion; x – Division champion/co-champions; y – Championship game participant; Rankings from AP Poll

The 2022 ACC Championship Game was a college football conference championship game that was played on December 3, 2022, at Bank of America Stadium in Charlotte, North Carolina to determine the champion of the Atlantic Coast Conference (ACC) for the 2022 season. The game featured the Clemson Tigers, the champion of the Atlantic Division, and the North Carolina Tar Heels, the champion of the Coastal Division. The 18th annual ACC Championship Game, the contest began at 8:00 p.m. EST and aired on ABC. Sponsored by restaurant chain Subway, the game was officially known as the Subway ACC Championship Game.

== Teams ==
The 2022 ACC Championship Game featured the Clemson Tigers, champions of the Atlantic Division, and the North Carolina Tar Heels, champions of the Coastal Division. The last time these two teams met in the ACC Championship Game was in 2015, where the Tigers beat the Tar Heels 45-37.

=== Clemson ===
The Tigers clinched a spot in the game as the champion of the ACC's Atlantic Division following Pittsburgh's defeat of Syracuse on November 5.

=== North Carolina ===
The Tar Heels clinched a spot in the game as the champion of the ACC's Coastal Division following their defeat of Wake Forest on November 12.

== Game summary ==
2022 Subway ACC Championship Game

Quarter	1	2	3	4	Total
No. 9 Clemson	14	10	15	0	39
No. 23 North Carolina	7	3	0	0	10

at Bank of America Stadium • Charlotte, North Carolina

- Date: Saturday, December 3, 2022
- Game time: 8:00 p.m. EST
- Game weather: Temperature: 58 °F (14 °C) • Overcast • Wind: 4 mph (6.4 km/h) WSW
- Game attendance: 64,115
- Referee: Mike Roche
- TV announcers (ABC): Sean McDonough (play-by-play), Todd Blackledge (analyst) and Molly McGrath (sideline reporter)

Game information

First quarter

- (8:50) UNC - Drake Maye 3 yard rush (Noah Burnette Kick) (UNC 7-0)
- (1:41) CLEM - Davis Allen 1 yard pass from Cade Klubnik (B. T. Potter Kick) (Tied 7-7)
- (0:35) CLEM - Phil Mafah 4 yard rush (B.T. Potter Kick) (CLEM 14-7)

Second quarter

- (6:02) CLEM - Cade Klubnik 1 yard rush (B.T. Potter Kick) (CLEM 21-7)
- (1:20) UNC - Noah Burnette 26 yard Field Goal (CLEM 21-10)
- (0:00) CLEM - B.T. Potter 52 yard Field Goal (CLEM 24-10)

Third quarter

- (5:05) CLEM - Nate Wiggins 98 yard Interception Return (Drew Swinney Rush for 2-PT Conversion) (CLEM 32-10)
- (0:42) CLEM - Will Shipley 2 yard rush (B.T. Potter Kick) (CLEM 39-10)

Fourth quarter

No Scoring

=== Statistics ===
Statistics	Clemson	North Carolina
First downs	17	26
Plays–yards	56-385	79–384
Rushes–yards	21-68	36–111
Passing yards	317	273
Passing: comp–att–int	28–35–0	27–43–2
Time of possession	24:59	35:01

Team	Category	Player	Statistics
Clemson	Passing	Cade Klubnik	20/24, 279 yards, TD
Clemson	Rushing	Cade Klubnik	7 carries, 30 yards, TD
Clemson	Receiving	Cole Turner	3 receptions, 101 yards
North Carolina	Passing	Drake Maye	26/42, 268 yards, 2 INT
North Carolina	Rushing	Elijah Green	21 carries, 65 yards
North Carolina	Receiving	Josh Downs	11 receptions, 100 yards
