= Sebastian Cheeks =

American football player (born 2004)

No. 15 – Wisconsin Badgers
- Position: Outside linebacker
- Class: Senior

Personal information
- Born: February 6, 2004 (age 22)
- Listed height: 6 ft 3 in (1.91 m)
- Listed weight: 243 lb (110 kg)

Career information
- High school: Evanston Township (Evanston, Illinois)
- College: North Carolina (2022–2023); Wisconsin (2024–present)
- Stats at ESPN

Sebastian Cheeks (born February 6, 2004) is an American college football outside linebacker for the Wisconsin Badgers. He previously played for the North Carolina Tar Heels.

== Early life ==
Cheeks attended Evanston Township High School in Evanston, Illinois, where he played linebacker and running back. As a sophomore he recorded two interceptions which he returned for touchdowns over his first four games before suffering a season-ending injury. Cheeks was selected to play in the 2022 All-American Bowl, where he was named the All-American Bowl's Man of the Year. A four-star recruit, he committed to University of North Carolina at Chapel Hill to play college football.

== College career ==
Cheeks played the 2022 and 2023 season with North Carolina, recording four tackles over eight games. After the 2023 season, he entered the transfer portal and committed to the University of Wisconsin Madison. In his first year at Wisconsin in 2024, he played in 11 games and had 12 tackles with two sacks. Cheeks started three of 12 games in 2025, recording 24 tackles and three sacks. He returned to Wisconsin as a starter in 2026.
