= Asim Richards =

American football player (born 2000)

No. 72 – New Orleans Saints
- Position: Offensive tackle
- Roster status: Active

Personal information
- Born: October 2, 2000 (age 26); Philadelphia, Pennsylvania, U.S.
- Listed height: 6 ft 4 in (1.93 m)
- Listed weight: 307 lb (139 kg)

Career information
- High school: Haverford School (Haverford, Pennsylvania)
- College: North Carolina (2019–2022)
- NFL draft: 2023: 5th round, 169th overall pick

Career history
- Dallas Cowboys (2023–2024); New Orleans Saints (2025–present)

Awards and highlights
- Third-team All-ACC (2022)

Career NFL statistics as of Week 5, 2026
- Games played: 41
- Games started: 8
- Stats at Pro Football Reference

Asim Richards (born October 2, 2000) is an American professional football offensive tackle for the New Orleans Saints of the National Football League (NFL). He played college football for the North Carolina Tar Heels.

== Early life ==
Richards was born on October 2, 2000, in Philadelphia, Pennsylvania. He attended Haverford School, where he played football and basketball.

On the football team, he spent most of his time as a defensive end and tight end. As a junior, he received second-team All-Inter-Ac honors at defensive end.

As a senior, he started the final four games at offensive tackle. He received All-Inter-Ac League honors and a Mini Max award, given by the Maxwell Football Club to the standout players in eastern Pennsylvania.

Richards finished his high school career with 133 tackles (31 for loss), 13 sacks, 3 forced fumbles and 3 fumble recoveries. He was ranked as a three-star prospect, the sixth-best recruit in the state and the 42nd-best tackle overall, he committed to play college football at North Carolina.

== College career ==
As a true freshman in 2019, he appeared in 9 games, mostly in a backup role on the offensive line and on special teams.

As a sophomore in 2020, he was named the full starter at left tackle, starting in all but one of the 12 games of the season. He was part of an offensive line that included offensive guards Joshua Ezeudu and Marcus McKethan. He also blocked for future NFL players Sam Howell, Javonte Williams and Michael Carter.

As a junior in 2021, he started all 13 games at left tackle and blocked for future NFL running back Ty Chandler.

As a senior in 2022, he started all 14 games at left tackle and was named third-team all-conference after allowing only three sacks on close to 1,050 snaps. He blocked for quarterback Drake Maye, helping the offense place third in the Atlantic Coast Conference (ACC) in points per game, second in passing yards per game and total yards per game, and first in rushing. Although Richards had one year of eligibility remaining, he opted to enter the 2023 NFL draft. He finished with 38 career starts (37 at left tackle, one at left guard), including 34 consecutive. He was invited to the 2023 Senior Bowl.

== Professional career ==
Pre-draft measurables
Height	Weight	Arm length	Hand span	Wingspan	40-yard dash	10-yard split	20-yard split	20-yard shuttle	Three-cone drill	Vertical jump	Broad jump	Bench press
6 ft 4 1/4 in (1.94 m)	309 lb (140 kg)	34 in (0.86 m)	10 in (0.25 m)	6 ft 10 3/4 in (2.10 m)	5.16 s	1.77 s	3.02 s	4.89 s	7.76 s	29.0 in (0.74 m)	8 ft 11 in (2.72 m)	13 reps
All values from NFL Combine/Pro Day

=== Dallas Cowboys ===
Richards was selected by the Dallas Cowboys in the fifth round (169th overall) of the 2023 NFL draft. As a rookie, he appeared in eight games. In Week 8 against the Los Angeles Rams, saw action at left tackle early in the fourth quarter while Chuma Edoga was out with an ankle injury. He was declared inactive 9 contests and in the Wild Card playoff game against the Green Bay Packers.

In 2024, he appeared in 13 games with one start at left tackle, while showing that he could also play the guard position. He missed four contests from Week 13 to Week 16 with an ankle injury. In Week 10 against the Philadelphia Eagles, he made his first start at left tackle in place of injured first round draft choice Tyler Guyton. He also saw significant playing time at left tackle in the season finale against the Washington Commanders.

In 2025, he was expected to be the team's backup left tackle, but was passed on the depth chart during the preseason by second-year player Nate Thomas.

=== New Orleans Saints ===
On August 26, 2025, Richards was traded to the New Orleans Saints along with a 2028 seventh-round pick in exchange for a 2028 sixth-round pick. He was acquired to be the team's backup swing tackle.
