= 2021 North Carolina Tar Heels football team =

American college football season

2021 North Carolina Tar Heels football

Duke's Mayo Bowl, L 21–38 vs. South Carolina
- Conference: Atlantic Coast Conference
- Coastal Division
- Record: 6–7 (3–5 ACC)
- Head coach: Mack Brown (13th season)
- Offensive coordinator: Phil Longo (3rd season)
- Offensive scheme: Air raid
- Co-defensive coordinators: Jay Bateman (3rd season); Tommy Thigpen (3rd season)
- Base defense: 4–2–5
- Home stadium: Kenan Stadium

2021 Atlantic Coast Conference football standings
	Conf.			Overall
Team	W		L	W		L
Atlantic Division
No. 15 Wake Forest xy	7	–	1	11	–	3
No. 20 NC State	6	–	2	9	–	3
No. 14 Clemson	6	–	2	10	–	3
Louisville	4	–	4	6	–	7
Florida State	4	–	4	5	–	7
Boston College	2	–	6	6	–	6
Syracuse	2	–	6	5	–	7
Coastal Division
No. 13 Pittsburgh xy$	7	–	1	11	–	3
Miami (FL)	5	–	3	7	–	5
Virginia Tech	4	–	4	6	–	7
Virginia	4	–	4	6	–	6
North Carolina	3	–	5	6	–	7
Georgia Tech	2	–	6	3	–	9
Duke	0	–	8	3	–	9
Championship: Pittsburgh 45, Wake Forest 21
$ – Conference champion; x – Division champion/co-champions; y – Championship game participant; Rankings from AP Poll

The 2021 North Carolina Tar Heels football team represented the University of North Carolina at Chapel Hill as a member of Coastal Division of the Atlantic Coast Conference (ACC) for the 2021 NCAA Division I FBS football season. The Tar Heels were led by head coach Mack Brown, who was in the third season of his second stint at North Carolina and his 13th overall season at the university. The team played their home games at Kenan Stadium.

== Personnel ==
=== Coaching staff ===
North Carolina Tar Heels coaches
Mack Brown	Head coach	3rd of second stint, 13th overall
Phil Longo	Offensive coordinator/quarterbacks coach	3rd
John Lilly	Tight end coach	2nd
Stacy Searels	Offensive line coach	3rd
Lonnie Galloway	Assistant head coach/Wide receivers coach	3rd
Larry Porter	Running backs coach/Assistant Special teams coordinator	1st
Jay Bateman	Defensive coordinator/Safeties coach	3rd
Tommy Thigpen	Associate Defensive coordinator/Inside linebackers coach	4th
Tim Cross	Defensive line coach	3rd
Jovan Dewitt	Special teams coordinator/Outside linebackers coach	2nd
Dre Bly	Cornerbacks coach	3rd
Brian Hess	Strength and conditioning	3rd
Natrone Means	Offensive analyst	1st
Sparky Woods	Senior advisor to head coach	3rd
Darrell Moody	Senior advisor to head coach	3rd
Ken Browning	Senior advisor to head coach	3rd

=== Roster ===
2021 North Carolina Tar Heels Football Roster
Quarterback: 6 Jacolby Criswell – sophomore (6'1, 225); 7 Sam Howell – junior (6'1, 225); 10 Drake Maye – freshman (6'5, 220); 14 Jefferson Boaz – (redshirt) freshman (6'7, 245); Running back: 4 Caleb Hood – freshman (5'11, 230); 19 Ty Chandler – graduate (6'0, 210); 21 Elijah Green – (redshirt) freshman (5'11, 205); 24 British Brooks – senior (5'11, 210); 26 D.J. Jones – sophomore (5'10, 205); 33 Kamarro Edmonds – freshman (5'11, 230); Wide receiver: 2 Gavin Blackwell – freshman (5'11, 185); 3 Antoine Green – senior (6'2, 210); 5 J.J. Jones – freshman (6'2, 200); 8 Kobe Paysour – freshman (6'1, 180); 11 Josh Downs – sophomore (5'10, 180); 12 Stephen Gosnell – sophomore (6'2, 210); 13 Tylee Craft – sophomore (6'4, 205); 15 Beau Corrales – senior (6'3, 210); 83 Justin Olson – sophomore (6'2, 200); Placekicker: 17 Grayson Atkins – graduate (5'9, 210); 95 Jonathan Kim – junior (6'0, 210); 98 Noah Burnette – (redshirt) freshman (5'9, 175); Punter: 91 Ben Kiernan – junior (6'0, 215); 92 Cole Maynard — Freshman (6'2, 165)	Tight end: 18 Bryson Nesbit – freshman (6'6, 245); 81 John Copenhaver – (redshirt) freshman (6'3, 245); 82 Kendall Karr – (redshirt) freshman (6'3, 245); 84 Garrett Walston – graduate (6'4, 245); 88 Kamari Morales – sophomore (6'2, 250); Offensive lineman: 51 Wyatt Tunall – sophomore (6'5, 305); 52 Jonathan Adorno – sophomore (6'4, 315); 54 Chance Carroll – (redshirt) freshman (6'2, 300); 57 Cayden Baker – sophomore (6'5, 305); 61 Diego Pounds – freshman (6'7, 330); 63 Ed Montilus – junior (6'4, 315); 66 Eli Sutton – freshman (6'7, 305); 64 Malik McGowan – (redshirt) freshman (6'3, 330); 67 Trey Zimmerman – (redshirt) freshman (6'5, 280); 68 Brian Anderson – senior (6'2, 305); 69 Quiron Johnson – graduate (6'2, 315); 72 Asim Richards – junior (6'4, 325); 73 Marcus McKethan – senior (6'7, 335); 74 Jordan Tucker – senior (6'7, 340); 75 Joshua Ezeudu – junior (6'4, 320); 76 William Barnes – junior (6'4, 325); 77 Wisdom Asaboro – sophomore (6'8, 315); 79 Hunter Shope – sophomore (6'1, 290); Defensive lineman: 5 Jahvaree Ritzie – freshman (6'5, 285); 6 Keeshawn Silver – freshman (6'6, 290); 8 Myles Murphy – sophomore (6'4, 305); 41 Kedrick Bingley-Jones – freshman (6'4, 280); 51 Raymond Vohasek – senior (6'3, 300); 52 Jahlil Taylor – junior (5'11, 310); 56 Tomari Fox – junior (6'2, 290); 98 Kevin Hester Jr. – sophomore (6'4, 305)	Linebacker: 7 Eugene Asante – junior (6'1, 220); 10 Desmond Evans – sophomore (6'6, 265); 11 Raneiria "Rara" Dillworth – freshman (6'1, 205); 12 Tomon Fox – graduate (6'3, 265); 17 Chris Collins – junior (6'4, 255); 19 Ethan West – (redshirt) freshman (6'3, 255); 23 Power Echols – freshman (5'11, 220); 25 Kaimon Rucker – sophomore (6'1, 265); 26 Trevion Stevenson ― Freshman (6'4, 240); 33 Cedric Gray – sophomore (6'1, 225); 34 Gabe Stephens – freshman (6'4, 225); 42 Tyrone Hopper – graduate (6'4, 245); 44 Jeremiah Gemmel – senior (6'1, 225); Defensive back: 0 Ja'Qurious Conley – sophomore (6'1, 210); 1 Kyler McMichael – junior (6'0, 210); 2 Don Chapman – junior (6'1, 195); 3 Cameron Roseman-Sinclair – (redshirt) freshman (5'11, 210); 4 Trey Morrison – senior (5'9, 190); 9 Cam'Ron Kelly – junior (6'1, 210); 13 Obi Egbuna – junior (5'10, 190); 14 Dontae Balfour – freshman (6'2, 180); 15 Ladaeson DeAndre Hollins – junior (6'2, 210); 16 DeAndre Boykins – freshman (5'11, 210); 18 Christopher Holliday – (redshirt) freshman (6'3, 215); 20 Tony Grimes – sophomore (6'1, 190); 21 Dontavius Nash – freshman (6'1, 180); 27 Giovanni Biggers – junior (6'1, 195); 28 Tymir Brown – freshman (5'10, 180); 29 Storm Duck – sophomore (6'0, 205); Long snappers: 61 Drew Little – junior (5'11, 220); 62 Spencer Triplett – (redshirt) freshman (6'3, 235)
North Carolina Tar Heels Football Roster as of 10/25/2021

== Offseason ==
=== Coaching changes ===
Larry Porter was hired in January for his second stint as the Tar Heels' running backs coach, replacing Robert Gillespie, who departed for the same position at Alabama. Porter's first tenure at UNC came under previous head coach Larry Fedora from 2014–2016. He was also given the title of Assistant Special teams coordinator. Former Tar Heel and NFL running back Natrone Means was also hired in the offseason as an offensive analyst.

=== Departures ===
==== NFL draft ====
The following Tar Heels were selected in the 2021 NFL Draft.

Round	Pick	Player	Position	NFL team
2	35	Javonte Williams	RB	Denver Broncos
3	78	Chazz Surratt	LB	Minnesota Vikings
3	82	Dyami Brown	WR	Washington Football Team
4	107	Michael Carter	RB	New York Jets
6	221	Dazz Newsome	WR	Chicago Bears

==== Transfers ====
The Tar Heels lost sixteen players from the 2020 season.

Name	No.	Pos.	Height	Weight	Hometown	Year	New school
Bryson Richardson	#6	DB	6’0	203	Lawrenceville, GA	Sophomore	UMass
Myles Wolfolk	#11	DB	5’11	205	Largo, MD	Senior†	Bowie State
Billy Ross	#56	OL	6’5	315	Huntington, WV	Junior	Marshall
DJ Ford	#16	S	6’3	208	Ashland, AL	Senior†	ECU
Bryce Watts	#2	DB	6’0	180	Toms River, NJ	(redshirt) Junior	UMass
Xach Gill	#90	DT	6’5	290	Wake Forest, NC	Junior	Temple
Jace Ruder	#10	QB	6’3	228	Norton, KS	(redshirt) Sophomore	North Texas
Noah Ruggles	#97	PK	6’2	195	Odessa, FL	Junior	Ohio State
Triston Miller	#71	OL	6'5	290	Charlotte, NC	(redshirt) Freshman	Arizona State
Lancine Turay	#58	DT	6’6	270	Newark, NJ	(redshirt) Sophomore	Temple
Rontavius Groves	#4	WR	5’11	180	Nashville, TN	Junior	Texas State
Patrice Rene	#5	DB	6’2	205	Ottawa, ON	Senior†	Rutgers
Ray Rose	#9	WR	6’1	215	Belmont, NC	Freshman	ECU
Khadry Jackson	#8	LB	6’1	230	Orlando, FL	Junior	Georgia Southern
Welton Spottsville	#14	DB	6’0	220	Havelock, NC	Sophomore	Kennesaw State
AJ Beatty	#54	OL	6’5	300	Pittsburgh, PA	Freshman	Albany

†Denotes player who was listed as a senior by UNC, and chose to transfer elsewhere for the extra year of eligibility granted by the NCAA in response to the COVID-19 pandemic

=== Additions ===
==== Incoming transfers ====
Name	No.	Pos.	Height	Weight	Year	Hometown	Prev. school
Ty Chandler	#19	RB	6'0	205	Graduate	Nashville, TN	Tennessee

==== Recruiting class ====
North Carolina signed 19 players in the 2021 class. The Tar Heels' class finished 14th in the 247Sports football recruiting rankings, 16th in the Rivals rankings, and 7th in the ESPN recruiting rankings. Eleven signees were ranked in the ESPN 300 top prospect list.

College recruiting
Name	Hometown	School	Height	Weight	Commit date
Keeshawn Silver; DL	Rocky Mount, NC	Rocky Mount	6 ft 6 in (1.98 m)	275 lb (125 kg)	Mar 3, 2020
Keeshawn Silver; DL	Recruit ratings: Rivals: 247Sports: ESPN: (90)				
Drake Maye; QB	Charlotte, NC	Myers Park	6 ft 5 in (1.96 m)	210 lb (95 kg)	Mar 6, 2020
Drake Maye; QB	Recruit ratings: Rivals: 247Sports: ESPN: (86)				
Raneiria Dillworth; LB	Kernersville, NC	Glenn	6 ft 2 in (1.88 m)	193 lb (88 kg)	Apr 17, 2020
Raneiria Dillworth; LB	Recruit ratings: Rivals: 247Sports: ESPN: (85)				
Power Echols; LB	Charlotte, NC	Julius L. Chambers	6 ft 1 in (1.85 m)	206 lb (93 kg)	Jan 25, 2020
Power Echols; LB	Recruit ratings: Rivals: 247Sports: ESPN: (83)				
Gavin Blackwell; WR	Monroe, NC	Sun Valley	6 ft 0 in (1.83 m)	165 lb (75 kg)	Feb 10, 2020
Gavin Blackwell; WR	Recruit ratings: Rivals: 247Sports: ESPN: (83)				
Tymir Brown; DB	Jacksonville, NC	Jacksonville	6 ft 1 in (1.85 m)	165 lb (75 kg)	Mar 17, 2020
Tymir Brown; DB	Recruit ratings: Rivals: 247Sports: ESPN: (83)				
Kamarro Edmonds; RB	Havelock, NC	Havelock	5 ft 11 in (1.80 m)	185 lb (84 kg)	Apr 3, 2020
Kamarro Edmonds; RB	Recruit ratings: Rivals: 247Sports: ESPN: (83)				
DeAndre Boykins; DB	Concord, NC	Central Cabarrus	5 ft 11 in (1.80 m)	195 lb (88 kg)	Mar 18, 2020
DeAndre Boykins; DB	Recruit ratings: Rivals: 247Sports: ESPN: (82)				
Dontavius Nash; DB	Gastonia, NC	Hunter Huss	6 ft 2 in (1.88 m)	170 lb (77 kg)	Jun 15, 2019
Dontavius Nash; DB	Recruit ratings: Rivals: 247Sports: ESPN: (82)				
Diego Pounds; OL	Raleigh, NC	Millbrook	6 ft 6 in (1.98 m)	275 lb (125 kg)	Sep 25, 2020
Diego Pounds; OL	Recruit ratings: Rivals: 247Sports: ESPN: (81)				
Jahvaree Ritzie; DL	Kernersville, NC	Glenn	6 ft 5 in (1.96 m)	285 lb (129 kg)	Jun 12, 2020
Jahvaree Ritzie; DL	Recruit ratings: Rivals: 247Sports: ESPN: (81)				
Kobe Paysour; WR	Kings Mountain, NC	Kings Mountain	6 ft 0 in (1.83 m)	175 lb (79 kg)	Mar 7, 2020
Kobe Paysour; WR	Recruit ratings: Rivals: 247Sports: ESPN: (80)				
Gabe Stephens; LB	Mount Holly, NC	Mountain Island Charter	6 ft 3 in (1.91 m)	200 lb (91 kg)	Feb 7, 2020
Gabe Stephens; LB	Recruit ratings: Rivals: 247Sports: ESPN: (80)				
Eli Sutton; OL	Brentwood, TN	Brentwood Academy	6 ft 6 in (1.98 m)	280 lb (130 kg)	Mar 8, 2020
Eli Sutton; OL	Recruit ratings: Rivals: 247Sports: ESPN: (80)				
Dontae Balfour; DB	Starke, FL	Bradford	6 ft 3 in (1.91 m)	170 lb (77 kg)	Feb 3, 2021
Dontae Balfour; DB	Recruit ratings: Rivals: 247Sports: ESPN: (79)				
Trevion Stevenson; EDGE	Hampton, VA	Phoebus	6 ft 4 in (1.93 m)	220 lb (100 kg)	Jul 18, 2020
Trevion Stevenson; EDGE	Recruit ratings: Rivals: 247Sports: ESPN: (79)				
Bryson Nesbit; TE	Charlotte, NC	South Mecklenburg	6 ft 6 in (1.98 m)	220 lb (100 kg)	Dec 1, 2020
Bryson Nesbit; TE	Recruit ratings: Rivals: 247Sports: ESPN: (79)				
JJ Jones; WR	Myrtle Beach, SC	Myrtle Beach	6 ft 2 in (1.88 m)	190 lb (86 kg)	May 21, 2020
JJ Jones; WR	Recruit ratings: Rivals: 247Sports: ESPN: (79)				
Caleb Hood; RB	Rockingham, NC	Richmond Senior	5 ft 11 in (1.80 m)	210 lb (95 kg)	Jun 12, 2020
Caleb Hood; RB	Recruit ratings: Rivals: 247Sports: ESPN: (76)				
Overall recruit ranking: Rivals: #16 247Sports: #14 ESPN: #7
Note: In many cases, Scout, Rivals, 247Sports, On3, and ESPN may conflict in their listings of height and weight.; In these cases, the average was taken. ESPN grades are on a 100-point scale.; Sources: "Rivals commits". Rivals.; "ESPN commits". ESPN.; "2021 Team Ranking". Rivals.com.; "247Sports commits". 247Sports.

== Schedule ==
Date	Time	Opponent	Rank	Site	TV	Result	Attendance
September 3	6:00 p.m.	at Virginia Tech	No. 10	Lane Stadium; Blacksburg, VA	ESPN	L 10–17	65,632
September 11	7:30 p.m.	Georgia State*	No. 24	Kenan Stadium; Chapel Hill, NC	ACCRSN	W 59–17	50,500
September 18	7:30 p.m.	Virginia	No. 21	Kenan Stadium; Chapel Hill, NC (South's Oldest Rivalry)	ACCN	W 59–39	50,500
September 25	7:30 p.m.	at Georgia Tech	No. 21	Mercedes-Benz Stadium; Atlanta, GA	ACCN	L 22–45	37,450
October 2	12:00 p.m.	Duke		Kenan Stadium; Chapel Hill, NC (Victory Bell)	ESPN2	W 38–7	45,812
October 9	3:30 p.m.	Florida State		Kenan Stadium; Chapel Hill, NC	ESPN	L 25–35	44,805
October 16	3:30 p.m.	Miami		Kenan Stadium; Chapel Hill, NC	ACCN	W 45–42	50,500
October 30	7:30 p.m.	at No. 11 Notre Dame*		Notre Dame Stadium; Notre Dame, IN (rivalry)	NBC	L 34–44	71,018
November 6	12:00 p.m.	No. 9 Wake Forest*^{†} (Note: Although both North Carolina and Wake Forest are ACC members, this game will not count in the conference standings. The schools scheduled it as a non-conference game because they otherwise only play once every six years due to conference divisional alignment.)		Kenan Stadium; Chapel Hill, NC (rivalry)	ABC	W 58–55	50,500
November 11	7:30 p.m.	at No. 21 Pittsburgh		Heinz Field; Pittsburgh, PA	ESPN	L 23–30 ^{OT}	41,687
November 20	12:00 p.m.	Wofford*		Kenan Stadium; Chapel Hill, NC	ACCRSN	W 34–14	43,011
November 26	7:00 p.m.	at No. 20 NC State		Carter–Finley Stadium; Raleigh, NC (rivalry)	ESPN	L 30–34	56,919
December 30	11:30 a.m.	vs. South Carolina*		Bank of America Stadium; Charlotte, NC (Duke's Mayo Bowl, rivalry)	ESPN	L 21–38	45,520
*Non-conference game; ^{†}Homecoming; Rankings from AP and CFP Rankings after November 2; All times are in Eastern time

== Game summaries ==
=== At Virginia Tech ===
North Carolina at Virginia Tech

Team	1	2	3	4	Total
No. 10 Tar Heels	0	0	7	3	10
• Hokies	7	7	0	3	17

- Date: September 3, 2021
- Location: Lane Stadium
  Blacksburg, VA
- Game start: 6:00 p.m. EDT
- Elapsed time: 3 hours, 13 minutes
- Game attendance: 65,632
- Game weather: Temperature: 77 °F (25 °C) • Weather: Sunny • Wind: NW 0 MPH
- Referee: Duane Heydt
- TV announcers (ESPN): Jason Benetti (play–by–play), Andre Ware (analyst), and Paul Carcaterra (sideline)

Scoring summary
1	10:01	VT	Braxton Burmeister 4 yd. run (John Parker Romo kick) (8 plays, 75 yards, 4:59)	VT 7–0
2	3:07	VT	James Mitchell 11 yd. pass from Braxton Burmeister (John Parker Romo kick) (12 plays, 80 yards, 7:19)	VT 14–0
3	4:20	UNC	Josh Downs 37 yd. pass from Sam Howell (Grayson Atkins kick) (6 plays, 61 yards, 2:55)	VT 14–7
4	14:18	VT	John Parker Romo 48 yd. field goal (8 plays, 45 yards, 5:02)	VT 17–7
4	5:53	UNC	Grayson Atkins 31 yd. field goal (9 plays, 66 yards, 3:46)	VT 17–10

Statistics	UNC	VT
First downs	18	17
Total yards	354	296
Rushing yards	146	127
Passing yards	208	169
Turnovers	3	2
Time of possession	25:03	34:57

Team	Category	Player	Statistics
North Carolina	Passing	Sam Howell	17/32, 208 yards, TD, 3 INT
North Carolina	Rushing	Ty Chandler	10 carries, 66 yards
North Carolina	Receiving	Josh Downs	8 receptions, 123 yards, TD
Virginia Tech	Passing	Braxton Burmeister	12/19, 169 yards, TD, INT
Virginia Tech	Rushing	Jalen Holston	13 carries, 49 yards
Virginia Tech	Receiving	Raheem Blackshear	3 receptions, 66 yards

=== Georgia State ===
Georgia State at North Carolina

Team	1	2	3	4	Total
Panthers	3	7	0	7	17
• No. 24 Tar Heels	14	10	21	14	59

- Date: September 11, 2021
- Location: Kenan Stadium
  Chapel Hill, NC
- Game start: 7:30 p.m. EDT
- Elapsed time: 3 hours, 35 minutes
- Game attendance: 50,500
- Game weather: Temperature: 75 °F (24 °C) • Weather: Sunny • Wind: S 3 MPH
- Referee: Jeremy Parker
- TV announcers (ACCRSN/ESPN3): Tom Werme (play-by-play), James Bates (analyst), and Abby Labar (sideline)

Scoring summary
1	11:45	UNC	Sam Howell 22 yd. run (Grayson Atkins kick) (6 plays, 74 yards, 2:21)	UNC 7–0
1	7:55	UNC	Antoine Green 57 yd. pass from Sam Howell (Grayson Atkins kick) (4 plays, 68 yards, 1:16)	UNC 14–0
1	3:28	GSU	Noel Ruiz 37 yd. field goal (4 plays, 0 yards, 0:58)	UNC 14–3
2	13:49	UNC	Emery Simmons 30 yd. pass from Sam Howell (Grayson Atkins kick) (10 plays, 67 yards, 4:39)	UNC 21–3
2	6:19	GSU	Cornelious Brown IV 4 yd. run (Noel Ruiz kick) (17 plays, 75 yards, 7:30)	UNC 21–10
2	0:56	UNC	Grayson Atkins 29 yd. field goal (6 plays, 9 yards, 2:07)	UNC 24–10
3	5:32	UNC	British Brooks 1 yd. run (Grayson Atkins kick) (9 plays, 63 yards, 3:31)	UNC 31–10
3	2:46	UNC	Ty Chandler 2 yd. run (Grayson Atkins kick) (5 plays, 76 yards, 1:49)	UNC 38–10
3	0:08	UNC	Sam Howell 62 yd. run (Grayson Atkins kick) (4 plays, 86 yards, 1:37)	UNC 45–10
4	11:22	UNC	Josh Downs 5 yd. pass from Sam Howell (Grayson Atkins kick) ( 6 plays, 40 yards, 2:07)	UNC 52–10
4	8:13	GSU	Marcus Carroll 2 yd run (Noel Ruiz kick) (9 plays, 75 yards, 3:09)	UNC 52–17
4	4:03	UNC	Bryson Nesbit 47 yd. pass from Jacolby Criswell (Jonathan Kim kick) (7 plays, 75 yards, 4:10)	UNC 59–17

Statistics	GSU	UNC
First downs	16	28
Total yards	271	607
Rushing yards	181	201
Passing yards	90	406
Turnovers	1	1
Time of possession	30:17	29:43

Team	Category	Player	Statistics
Georgia State	Passing	Cornelious Brown IV	12/26, 68 yards, INT
Georgia State	Rushing	Darren Grainger	5 carries, 56 yards
Georgia State	Receiving	Jamari Thrash	2 receptions, 18 yards
North Carolina	Passing	Sam Howell	21/29, 352 yards, 3 TD
North Carolina	Rushing	Sam Howell	11 carries, 104 yards, 2 TD
North Carolina	Receiving	Antoine Green	3 receptions, 117 yards, TD

=== Virginia ===
Virginia at North Carolina

Team	1	2	3	4	Total
Cavaliers	7	21	3	8	39
• No. 21 Tar Heels	21	3	21	14	59

- Date: September 18, 2021
- Location: Kenan Stadium
  Chapel Hill, NC
- Game start: 7:30 p.m. EDT
- Elapsed time: 3 hours, 35 minutes
- Game attendance: 50,500
- Game weather: Temperature: 80 °F (27 °C) • Weather: Sunny • Wind: E 4 MPH
- Referee: Stuart Mullins
- TV announcers (ACCN): Dave O'Brien (play–by–play), Tim Hasselbeck (analyst) and Kelsey Riggs (sideline)

Scoring summary
1	10:45	UNC	Josh Downs 59 yd. pass from Sam Howell (Grayson Atkins kick) (4 plays, 82 yards, 1:14)	UNC 7–0
1	7:00	UNC	Josh Downs 37 yd. pass from Sam Howell (Grayson Atkins kick) (3 plays, 82 yards, 1:16)	UNC 14–0
1	2:27	UVA	Wayne Tauliapapa 1 yd. run (Justin Duenkel kick) (10 plays, 72 yards, 4:33)	UNC 14–7
1	2:16	UNC	Khafre Brown 75 yd. pass from Sam Howell (Grayson Atkins kick) (1 plays, 75 yards, 0:11)	UNC 21–7
2	10:47	UNC	Grayson Atkins 36 yd. field goal (8 plays, 67 yards, 2:41)	UNC 24–7
2	9:13	UVA	Dontayvion Wicks 40 yd. pass from Brennan Armstrong (Justin Duenkel kick) (4 plays, 75 yards, 1:34)	UNC 24–14
2	2:54	UVA	Jelani Woods 1 yd. pass from Brennan Armstrong (Justin Duenkel kick) (7 plays, 49 yards, 2:44)	UNC 24–21
2	0:06	UVA	Billy Kemp IV 21 yd. pass from Brennan Armstrong (Justin Duenkel kick) (7 plays, 63 yards, 0:55)	UVA 28–24
3	12:50	UNC	Garrett Walston 5 yd. pass from Sam Howell (Grayson Atkins kick) (5 plays, 74 yards, 2:04)	UNC 31–28
3	7:26	UNC	Caleb Hood 5 yd. run (Grayson Atkins kick) (9 plays, 37 yards, 3:22)	UNC 38–28
3	4:57	UVA	Justin Duenkel 34 yd. field goal (9 plays, 58 yards, 2:29)	UNC 38–31
3	1:40	UNC	Ty Chandler 5 yd. run (Grayson Atkins kick) (8 plays, 75 yards, 3:17)	UNC 45–31
4	12:13	UNC	Kamari Morales 3 yd. pass from Sam Howell (Grayson Atkins kick) (9 plays, 70 yards, 3:20)	UNC 52–31
4	7:11	UVA	Billy Kemp IV 9 yd. pass from Brennan Armstrong (Jelani Woods pass from Brennan Armstrong) (12 plays, 75 yards, 5:02)	UNC 52–39
4	2:57	UNC	Ty Chandler 7 yd. run (Grayson Atkins kick) (8 plays, 65 yards, 4:14)	UNC 59–39

Statistics	UVA	UNC
First downs	27	35
Total yards	577	699
Rushing yards	24	392
Passing yards	553	307
Turnovers	2	1
Time of possession	32:41	27:19

Team	Category	Player	Statistics
Virginia	Passing	Brennan Armstrong	39/54, 554 yards, 4 TD, INT
Virginia	Rushing	Jacob Rodriguez	3 carries, 14 yards
Virginia	Receiving	Dontayvion Wicks	7 receptions, 183 yards, TD
North Carolina	Passing	Sam Howell	14/21, 307 yards, 5 TD, INT
North Carolina	Rushing	Ty Chandler	20 carries, 198 yards, 2 TD
North Carolina	Receiving	Josh Downs	8 receptions, 203 yards, 2 TD

=== At Georgia Tech ===
North Carolina at Georgia Tech

Team	1	2	3	4	Total
No. 21 Tar Heels	7	0	7	8	22
• Yellow Jackets	0	13	14	18	45

- Date: September 25, 2021
- Location: Mercedes-Benz Stadium
  Atlanta, GA
- Game start: 7:30 p.m. EDT
- Elapsed time: 3 hours, 24 minutes
- Game attendance: 37,450
- Game weather: 72 °F (22 °C) • Weather: Sunny • Wind: 0 MPH
- Referee: Gary Patterson
- TV announcers (ACCN): Roy Philpott (play-by-play), Tim Hasselbeck (analyst) and Kelsey Riggs (sideline)

Scoring summary
1	10:23	UNC	Sam Howell 23 yd. run (Grayson Atkins kick) (4 plays, 40 yards, 1:03)	UNC 7–0
2	14:21	GT	Brent Cimaglia 34 yd. field goal (9 plays, 64 yards, 5:02)	UNC 7–3
2	13:34	GT	Brent Cimaglia 32 yd. field goal (4 plays, −4 yards, 0:35)	UNC 7–6
2	2:41	GT	Jeff Sims 11 yd. run (Brent Cimaglia kick) (2 plays, 17 yards, 0:42)	GT 13–7
3	10:53	GT	Jeff Sims 1 yd. run (Brent Cimaglia kick) (3 plays, 39 yards, 0:32)	GT 20–7
3	5:39	GT	Jahmyr Gibbs 4 yd run (Brent Cimaglia kick) (8 plays, 81 yards, 2:50)	GT 27–7
3	3:50	UNC	Kamari Morales 7 yd. pass from Sam Howell (Grayson Atkins kick) (6 plays, 75 yards, 1:49)	GT 27–14
4	13:52	GT	Malachi Carter 27 yd. pass from Jeff Sims (Dylan Leonard pass from Peje' Harris) (9 plays, 75 yards, 4:58)	GT 35–14
4	11:19	UNC	Josh Downs 4 yd. pass from Sam Howell (Cayden Baker pass from Sam Howell) (8 plays, 75 yards, 2:33)	GT 35–22
4	4:07	GT	Brent Cimaglia 31 yd. field goal (12 plays, 52 yards, 7:11)	GT 38–22
4	1:13	GT	Jeff Sims 50 yd. run (Brent Cimaglia kick) (2 plays, 51 yards, 0:53)	GT 45–22

Statistics	UNC	GT
First downs	18	19
Total yards	369	394
Rushing yards	63	261
Passing yards	306	133
Turnovers	3	0
Time of possession	30:05	29:55

Team	Category	Player	Statistics
North Carolina	Passing	Sam Howell	25/39, 306 yards, 2 TD
North Carolina	Rushing	Ty Chandler	17 carries, 48 yards
North Carolina	Receiving	Emery Simmons	3 receptions, 110 yards
Georgia Tech	Passing	Jeff Sims	10/13, 112 yards, TD
Georgia Tech	Rushing	Jeff Sims	10 carries, 128 yards, 3 TD
Georgia Tech	Receiving	Malachi Carter	3 receptions, 48 yards, TD

=== Duke ===
Duke at North Carolina

Team	1	2	3	4	Total
Blue Devils	0	0	7	0	7
• Tar Heels	7	17	0	14	38

- Date: October 2, 2021
- Location: Kenan Stadium
  Chapel Hill, NC
- Game start: 12:00 p.m. EDT
- Elapsed time: 3 hours, 9 minutes
- Game attendance: 45,812
- Game weather: Temperature: 77 °F (25 °C) • Weather: Sunny • Wind: SW 8 MPH
- Referee: Riley Johnson
- TV announcers (ESPN2): Mike Morgan (play-by-play), Kirk Morrison (analyst), Dawn Davenport (sideline)

Scoring summary
1	0:07	UNC	Ty Chandler 75 yd. pass from Sam Howell (Grayson Atkins kick) (3 plays, 78 yards, 1:29)	UNC 7–0
2	13:25	UNC	Trey Morrison 63 yd. fumble return (Grayson Atkins kick) (6 plays, 39 yards, 1:42)	UNC 14–0
2	6:03	UNC	Kamari Morales 2 yd. pass from Sam Howell (Grayson Atkins kick) (7 plays, 67 yards, 2:22)	UNC 21–0
2	1:24	UNC	Grayson Atkins 28 yd. field goal (9 plays, 54 yards, 2:44)	UNC 24–0
3	14:40	DU	Jalon Calhoun 80 yd. pass from Gunnar Holmberg (Charlie Ham kick) (1 play, 80 yards, 0:20)	UNC 24–7
4	10:51	UNC	Ty Chandler 14 yd. run (Grayson Atkins kick) (8 play, 83 yards, 4:02)	UNC 31–7
4	6:04	UNC	Josh Downs 63 yd. pass from Sam Howell (Grayson Atkins kick) (6 play, 78 yards, 2:49)	UNC 38–7

Statistics	Duke	UNC
First downs	15	21
Total yards	314	456
Rushing yards	130	135
Passing yards	184	321
Turnovers	2	0
Time of possession	27:18	32:42

Team	Category	Player	Statistics
Duke	Passing	Gunnar Holmberg	17/24, 184 yards, TD, INT
Duke	Rushing	Mataeo Durant	19 carries, 114 yards
Duke	Receiving	Jalon Calhoun	6 receptions, 103 yards, TD
North Carolina	Passing	Sam Howell	18/32, 321 yards, 3 TD
North Carolina	Rushing	Ty Chandler	12 carries, 53 yards, TD
North Carolina	Receiving	Josh Downs	8 receptions, 168 yards, TD

=== Florida State ===
Florida State at North Carolina

Team	1	2	3	4	Total
• Seminoles	0	21	14	0	35
Tar Heels	10	0	7	8	25

- Date: October 9, 2021
- Location: Kenan Stadium
  Chapel Hill, NC
- Game start: 3:30 p.m. EDT
- Elapsed time: 3 hours, 18 minutes
- Game attendance: 44,805
- Game weather: Temperature: 68 °F (20 °C) • Weather: Cloudy • Wind: NE 4 MPH
- Referee: Jeff Heaser
- TV announcers (ESPN): Bob Wischusen (play–by–play), Dan Orlovsky (analyst) and Kris Budden (sideline)

Scoring summary
1	10:27	UNC	Grayson Atkins 51 yd. field goal (10 plays, 41 yards, 4:33)	UNC 3–0
1	2:55	UNC	Josh Downs 33 yd. pass from Sam Howell (Grayson Atkins kick) (12 plays, 70 yards, 6:34)	UNC 10–0
2	10:29	FSU	Malik McClain 5 yd. pass from Jordan Travis (Ryan Fitzgerald kick) (12 plays, 59 yards, 7:20	UNC 10–7
2	8:36	FSU	Jordan Travis 53 yd. run (Ryan Fitzgerald kick) (3 plays, 65 yards, 1:07)	FSU 14–10
2	0:53	FSU	Ontaria Wilson 32 yd. pass from Jordan Travis (Ryan Fitzgerald kick) (8 plays, 80 yards, 3:59)	FSU 21–10
3	9:42	UNC	Kamari Morales 21 yd. pass from Sam Howell (Grayson Atkins kick) (6 plays, 70 yards, 3:13)	FSU 21–17
3	7:43	FSU	Jordan Travis 1 yd. run (Ryan Fitzgerald kick) (5 plays, 75 yards, 1:59)	FSU 28–17
3	1:02	FSU	Ontaria Wilson 6 yd. pass from Jordan Travis (Ryan Fitzgerald kick) (9 plays, 83 yards, 4:53)	FSU 35–17
4	2:47	UNC	Ty Chandler 2 yd. run (Antoine Green pass from Josh Downs) (11 plays, 58 yards, 5:25)	FSU 35–25

Statistics	FSU	UNC
First downs	22	27
Total yards	383	432
Rushing yards	238	229
Passing yards	145	203
Turnovers	0	1
Time of possession	29:48	30:12

Team	Category	Player	Statistics
Florida State	Passing	Jordan Travis	11/13, 145 yards, 3 TD
Florida State	Rushing	Jordan Travis	14 carries, 121 yards, 2 TD
Florida State	Receiving	Keyshawn Helton	3 receptions, 71 yards
North Carolina	Passing	Sam Howell	17/32, 203 yards, 2 TD, INT
North Carolina	Rushing	Sam Howell	11 carries, 108 yards
North Carolina	Receiving	Josh Downs	9 receptions, 121 yards, TD

=== Miami ===
Miami at North Carolina

Team	1	2	3	4	Total
Hurricanes	10	7	17	8	42
• Tar Heels	14	17	7	7	45

- Date: October 16, 2021
- Location: Kenan Stadium
  Chapel Hill, NC
- Game start: 3:30 p.m. EDT
- Elapsed time: 3 hours, 36 minutes
- Game attendance: 50,500
- Game weather: Temperature: 73 °F (23 °C) • Weather: Cloudy • Wind: W 3 MPH
- Referee: Duane Heydt
- TV announcers (ACCN): Wes Durham (play-by-play), Roddy Jones (analyst), Alex Chappell (sideline)

Scoring summary
1	11:57	UNC	Ty Chandler 51 yd. run (Grayson Atkins kick) (7 plays, 75 yards, 3:03)	UNC 7–0
1	10:56	UM	Jahfari Harvey 33 yd. interception return (Andres Borregales kick) (1 play, 0 yards, 0:07)	Tie 7–7
1	8:03	UNC	Josh Downs 45 yd. pass from Sam Howell (Grayson Atkins kick) (6 plays, 75 yards, 2:53)	UNC 14–7
1	4:00	UM	Andres Borregales 44 yd. field goal (8 plays, 48 yards, 4:03)	UNC 14–10
2	10:46	UNC	John Copenhaver 2 yd. pass from Sam Howell (Grayson Atkins kick) (13 plays, 81 yards, 6:04)	UNC 21–10
2	6:16	UNC	Ty Chandler 4 yd. run (Grayson Atkins kick) (7 plays, 21 yards, 3:40)	UNC 28–10
2	4:33	UM	Jaylan Knighton 2 yd. run (Andres Borregales kick) (7 plays, 75 yards, 1:43)	UNC 28–17
2	0:00	UNC	Grayson Atkins 48 yd. field goal (5 plays, 12 yards, 0:55)	UNC 31–17
3	10:22	UM	Cody Brown 3 yd. run (Andres Borregales kick) (11 plays, 75 yards, 4:38)	UNC 31–24
3	8:21	UNC	Sam Howell 30 yd. run (Grayson Atkins kick) (4 plays, 75 yards, 2:01)	UNC 38–24
3	5:56	UM	Andres Borregales 42 yd. field goal (10 plays, 50 yards, 2:25)	UNC 38–27
3	2:25	UM	Jaylan Knighton 60 yd. pass from Tyler Van Dyke (Andres Borregales kick) (3 plays, 65 yards, 1:17)	UNC 38–34
4	9:22	UNC	Sam Howell 11 yd. run (Grayson Atkins kick) (8 plays, 58 yards, 4:20)	UNC 45–34
4	3:08	UM	Jaylan Knighton 4 yd. run (Charleston Rambo pass from Tyler Van Dyke) (12 plays, 97 yards, 3:32)	UNC 45–42

Statistics	Miami	UNC
First downs	30	23
Total yards	421	382
Rushing yards	157	228
Passing yards	264	154
Turnovers	3	1
Time of possession	26:09	33:51

Team	Category	Player	Statistics
Miami	Passing	Tyler Van Dyke	20/45, 264 yards, TD, 3 INT
Miami	Rushing	Jaylan Knighton	17 carries, 92 yards, 2 TD
Miami	Receiving	Keyshawn Smith	7 receptions, 73 yards
North Carolina	Passing	Sam Howell	17/26, 154 yards, 2 TD, INT
North Carolina	Rushing	Ty Chandler	18 carries, 104 yards, 2 TD
North Carolina	Receiving	Josh Downs	11 receptions, 96 yards, TD

=== At No. 11 Notre Dame ===
North Carolina at Notre Dame

Team	1	2	3	4	Total
Tar Heels	0	13	14	7	34
• No. 11 Fighting Irish	7	10	14	13	44

- Date: October 30, 2021
- Location: Notre Dame Stadium
  South Bend, IN
- Game start: 7:30 p.m. EDT
- Elapsed time: 3 hours, 22 minutes
- Game attendance: 71,018
- Game weather: Sunny
- Referee: Duane Heydt
- TV announcers (NBC): Mike Tirico (play-by-play), Drew Brees (analyst), Kathryn Tappen (sideline)

Scoring summary
1	3:25	ND	Avery Davis 7 yd. pass from Tyler Buchner (Jonathan Doerer kick) (7 plays, 41 yards, 3:19)	ND 7–0
2	14:55	UNC	Ty Chandler 3 yd. rush (Grayson Atkins kick) (8 plays, 81 yards, 3:23)	Tie 7–7
2	10:01	ND	Jonathan Doerer 31 yd. field goal (13 plays, 62 yards, 4:54)	ND 10–7
2	3:22	UNC	Grayson Atkins 38 yd. field goal (13 plays, 62 yards, 6:34)	Tie 10–10
2	1:23	ND	Kevin Austin Jr. 21 yd. pass from Jack Coan (Jonathan Doerer kick) (6 plays, 75 yards, 1:59)	ND 17–10
2	0:02	UNC	Grayson Atkins 26 yd. field goal (7 plays, 51 yards, 1:13)	ND 17–13
3	13:21	UNC	Ty Chandler 53 yd. rush (Grayson Atkins kick) (5 plays, 79 yards, 1:33)	UNC 20–17
3	12:23	ND	Jack Coan 21 yd. rush (Jonathan Doerer kick) (3 plays, 75 yards, 0:58)	ND 24–20
3	4:56	ND	Logan Diggs 1 yd. rush (Jonathan Doerer kick) (11 plays, 81 yards, 5:24)	ND 31–20
3	2:48	UNC	Antoine Green 33 yd. pass from Sam Howell (6 plays, 75 yards, 2:08)	ND 31–27
4	14:27	ND	Kyren Williams 91 yd. rush (Jonathan Doerer kick) (1 play, 91 yards, 0:17)	ND 38–27
4	11:52	ND	Jonathan Doerer 20 yd. field goal (5 plays, 13 yards, 2:28)	ND 41–27
4	7:23	UNC	Sam Howell 31 yd. rush (Grayson Atkins kick) (10 plays, 75 yards, 4:29)	ND 41–34
4	1:37	ND	Jonathan Doerer 21 yd. field goal (13 plays, 73 yards, 5:46)	ND 44–34

Statistics	UNC	ND
First downs	28	28
Total yards	564	523
Rushing yards	223	293
Passing yards	341	230
Turnovers	1	0
Time of possession	30:15	29:45

Team	Category	Player	Statistics
UNC	Passing	Sam Howell	24/31, 341 yards, TD, INT
UNC	Rushing	Sam Howell	18 carries, 101 yards, TD
UNC	Receiving	Josh Downs	10 receptions, 142 yards
Notre Dame	Passing	Jack Coan	16/24, 213 yards, TD
Notre Dame	Rushing	Kyren Williams	22 carries, 199 yards, TD
Notre Dame	Receiving	Avery Davis	5 receptions, 51 yards, TD

=== No. 9 Wake Forest ===
Wake Forest at North Carolina

Team	1	2	3	4	Total
No. 9 Demon Deacons	10	21	17	7	55
• Tar Heels	14	10	10	24	58

- Date: November 6, 2021
- Location: Kenan Stadium
  Chapel Hill, NC
- Game start: 12:00 p.m. EDT
- Elapsed time: 3 hours, 55 minutes
- Game attendance: 50,500
- Game weather: Temperature: 48 °F (9 °C) • Weather: Cloudy • Wind: NE 9 MPH
- Referee: Jeff Flanagan
- TV announcers (ABC): Sean McDonough (play-by-play), Todd Blackledge (analyst), Molly McGrath (sideline)

Scoring summary
1	12:42	WF	Nick Sciba 27 yd. field goal (7 plays, 29 yards, 2:10)	WF 3–0
1	9:47	UNC	Sam Howell 18 yd. run (Grayson Atkins kick) (8 plays, 79 yards, 2:50)	UNC 7–3
1	6:46	WF	Sam Hartman 6 yd. run (Nick Sciba kick) (9 plays, 75 yards, 3:01)	WF 10–7
1	3:29	UNC	Sam Howell 12 yd. run (Grayson Atkins kick) (3 plays, 42 yards, 0:41)	UNC 14–10
2	14:53	WF	Jaquarii Roberson 15 yd. pass from Sam Hartman (Nick Sciba kick) (11 plays, 75 yards, 3:36)	WF 17–14
2	9:41	UNC	Ty Chandler 1 yd. run (Grayson Atkins kick) (10 plays, 75 yards, 5:12)	UNC 21–17
2	8:25	WF	A. T. Perry 32 yd. pass from Sam Hartman (Nick Sciba kick) (5 plays, 75 yards, 1:16)	WF 24–21
2	1:09	WF	Taylor Morin 37 yd. pass from Sam Hartman (Nick Sciba kick) (6 plays, 62 yards, 1:42)	WF 31–21
2	0:00	UNC	Grayson Atkins 31 yd. field goal (6 plays, 61 yards, 1:01)	WF 31–24
3	12:24	NC	Grayson Atkins 23 yd. field goal (6 plays, 48 yards, 1:52)	WF 31–27
3	9:29	WF	Sam Hartman 21 yd. run (Nick Sciba kick) (9 plays, 75 yards, 2:55)	WF 38–27
3	7:38	WF	A. T. Perry 66 yd. pass from Sam Hartman (Nick Sciba kick) (2 plays, 77 yards, 0:27)	WF 45–27
3	4:54	UNC	Antoine Green 29 yd. pass from Sam Howell (Grayson Atkins kick) (6 plays, 75 yards, 2:44)	WF 45–34
3	1:01	WF	Nick Sciba 42 yd. field goal (11 plays, 51 yards, 3:53)	WF 48–34
4	11:22	UNC	Ty Chandler 13 yd. run (Grayson Atkins kick) (12 plays, 75 yards, 4:39)	WF 48–41
4	10:29	UNC	Ty Chandler 21 yd. run (Grayson Atkins kick) (2 plays, 21 yards, 0:11)	Tie 48–48
4	2:12	UNC	Grayson Atkins 25 yd. field goal (11 plays, 65 yards, 5:46)	UNC 51–48
4	1:12	UNC	Ty Chandler 50 yd. run (Grayson Atkins kick) (1 play, 35 yards, 0:10)	UNC 58–48
4	0:37	WF	Jaquarii Roberson 14 yd. pass from Sam Hartman (Nick Sciba kick) (4 plays, 47 yards, 0:30)	UNC 58–55

Statistics	Wake	UNC
First downs	35	31
Total yards	615	546
Rushing yards	217	330
Passing yards	398	216
Turnovers	2	1
Time of possession	26:27	33:33

Team	Category	Player	Statistics
Wake Forest	Passing	Sam Hartman	25/51, 398 yards, 5 TD, 2 INT
Wake Forest	Rushing	Justice Ellison	13 carries, 81 yards
Wake Forest	Receiving	Jaquarii Roberson	7 receptions, 111 yards, 2 TD
North Carolina	Passing	Sam Howell	16/26, 216 yards, TD
North Carolina	Rushing	Ty Chandler	22 carries, 213 yards, 4 TD
North Carolina	Receiving	Antoine Green	6 receptions, 83 yards, TD

=== At No. 25 Pittsburgh ===
North Carolina at Pittsburgh

Team	1	2	3	4	OT	Total
Tar Heels	0	7	6	10	0	23
• No. 25 Panthers	17	6	0	0	7	30

- Date: November 11, 2021
- Location: Heinz Field
  Pittsburgh, PA
- Game start: 7:30 p.m. EDT
- Elapsed time: 3 hours, 39 minutes
- Game weather: Temperature: 66 °F (19 °C) • Weather: Cloudy • Wind: SE 13 MPH
- Referee: Jerry Maggallanes
- TV announcers (ESPN): Matt Barrie (play-by-play), Roddy Jones (analyst), Katie George (sideline)

Scoring summary
1	8:00	PITT	Vincent Davis 2 yd. run (Sam Scarton kick) (4 plays, 20 yards, 1:30)	PITT 7–0
1	4:09	PITT	Gavin Bartholomew 1 yd. pass from Kenny Pickett (Sam Scarton kick) (4 plays, 48 yards, 1:32)	PITT 14–0
1	0:10	PITT	Sam Scarton 34 yd. field goal (7 plays, 62 yards, 2:13)	PITT 17–0
2	6:24	UNC	Antoine Green 76 yd. pass from Sam Howell (Grayson Atkins kick) (3 plays, 80 yards, 1:55)	PITT 17–7
2	4:40	PITT	Jared Wayne 32 yd. pass from Kenny Pickett. (Sam Scarton kick missed) (4 plays, 77 yards, 1:37)	PITT 23–7
3	5:39	UNC	Antoine Green 23 yd. pass from Sam Howell (Sam Howell run failed) (8 plays, 53 yards, 2:20)	PITT 23–13
4	5:34	UNC	Sam Howell 1 yd. run (Grayson Atkins kick) (11 plays, 92 yards, 6:14)	PITT 23–20
4	0:57	UNC	Grayson Atkins 20 yd. field goal (10 plays, 32 yards, 4:29)	Tie 23–23
OT		PITT	Lucas Krull 11 yd. pass from Kenny Pickett (Sam Scarton kick) (4 plays, 25 yards)	PITT 30–23

Statistics	UNC	PITT
First downs	16	25
Total yards	384	441
Rushing yards	88	95
Passing yards	296	346
Turnovers	1	1
Time of possession	34:11	25:49

Team	Category	Player	Statistics
North Carolina	Passing	Sam Howell	22/33, 296 yards, 2 TD, INT
North Carolina	Rushing	Ty Chandler	14 carries, 42 yards
North Carolina	Receiving	Antoine Green	3 receptions, 108 yards, 2 TD
Pittsburgh	Passing	Kenny Pickett	25/43, 346 yards, 3 TD, INT
Pittsburgh	Rushing	Israel Abanikanda	12 carries, 63 yards
Pittsburgh	Receiving	Jordan Addison	6 receptions, 84 yards

=== Wofford ===
Wofford at North Carolina

Team	1	2	3	4	Total
Terriers	0	7	0	7	14
• Tar Heels	10	10	14	0	34

- Date: November 20, 2021
- Location: Kenan Stadium
  Chapel Hill, NC
- Game start: 12:00 p.m. EDT
- Elapsed time: 2 hours, 46 minutes
- Game attendance: 43,011
- Game weather: Temperature: 48 °F (9 °C) • Weather: Sunny • Wind: N 2 MPH
- Referee: Marcus Woods
- TV announcers (ACCRSN): Tom Werme (play-by-play), James Bates (analyst), Rebecca Fiorentino (sideline)

Scoring summary
1	10:34	UNC	Jacolby Criswell 1 yd. run (Grayson Atkins kick) (10 plays, 82 yards, 4:21)	UNC 7–0
1	2:43	UNC	Grayson Atkins 27 yd. field goal (9 plays, 60 yards, 3:49)	UNC 10–0
2	6:22	WOF	Kyle Pinnix 3 yd. run (Walker Gliarmis kick) (12 plays, 71 yards, 6:54)	UNC 10–7
2	4:47	UNC	British Brooks 38 yd. run (Grayson Atkins kick) (4 plays, 75 yards, 1:35)	UNC 17–7
2	0:00	UNC	Grayson Atkins 34 yd. field goal (11 plays, 74 yards, 1:57)	UNC 20–7
3	11:41	UNC	British Brooks 14 yd. run (Grayson Atkins kick) (5 plays, 55 yards, 1:46)	UNC 27–7
3	0:55	UNC	Kamari Morales 4 yd. pass from Drake Maye (Grayson Atkins kick) (14 plays, 84 yards, 7:05)	UNC 34–7
4	9:04	WOF	Ryan Ingram 19 yd. run (Walker Gliarmis kick) (12 plays, 75 yards, 6:51)	UNC 34–14

Statistics	WOF	UNC
First downs	18	30
Total yards	302	519
Rushing yards	209	305
Passing yards	93	214
Turnovers	1	0
Time of possession	31:18	28:42

Team	Category	Player	Statistics
Wofford	Passing	Peyton Derrick	8/10, 93 yards, INT
Wofford	Rushing	Peyton Derrick	8 carries, 69 yards
Wofford	Receiving	Jim Welsh	3 receptions, 42 yards
North Carolina	Passing	Jacolby Criswell	11/19, 125 yards
North Carolina	Rushing	British Brooks	7 carries, 89 yards, 2 TD
North Carolina	Receiving	Josh Downs	8 receptions, 89 yards

=== At No. 20 N.C. State ===
North Carolina at N.C. State

Team	1	2	3	4	Total
Tar Heels	0	10	14	6	30
• No. 20 Wolfpack	14	0	7	13	34

- Date: November 26, 2021
- Location: Carter-Finley Stadium
  Raleigh, NC
- Game start: 7:00 p.m. EDT
- Elapsed time: 3 hours, 34 minutes
- Game attendance: 56,919
- Game weather: Temperature: 41 °F (5 °C) • Weather: Cloudy
- Referee: Jeff Heaser
- TV announcers (ESPN): Matt Barrie (play-by-play), Roddy Jones (analyst), Tiffany Blackmon (sideline)

Scoring summary
1	13:37	NCSU	CJ Riley 0 yd. blocked punt return (Christopher Dunn kick) (1:23)	NCSU 7–0
1	2:14	NCSU	Trent Pinnix 9 yd. pass from Devin Leary (Christopher Dunn kick) (7 plays, 64 yards, 3:48)	NCSU 14–0
2	14:06	UNC	Grayson Atkins 22 yd. field goal (7 plays, 70 yards, 3:08)	NCSU 14–7
2	2:02	UNC	Sam Howell 4 yd. run (Grayson Atkins kick) (6 plays, 64 yards, 2:06)	NCSU 14–10
3	9:05	UNC	Sam Howell 12 yd. run (Grayson Atkins kick) (5 plays, 23 yards, 1:23)	UNC 17–14
3	6:03	UNC	Justin Olson 17 yd. pass from Sam Howell (Grayson Atkins kick) (6 plays, 59 yards, 2:34)	UNC 24–14
3	0:32	NCSU	Thayer Thomas 26 yd. pass from Devin Leary (Christopher Dunn kick) (9 plays, 73 yards, 5:26)	UNC 24–21
4	7:44	UNC	Grayson Atkins 21 yd. field goal (10 plays, 67 yards, 2:32)	UNC 27–21
4	2:12	UNC	Grayson Atkins 50 yd. field goal (7 plays, 43 yards, 3:16)	UNC 30–21
4	1:35	NCSU	Emeka Emezie 64 yd. pass from Devin Leary (Christopher Dunn kick) (2 plays, 56 yards, 0:29)	UNC 30–28
4	1:09	NCSU	Emeka Emezie 24 yd. pass from Devin Leary (Devin Leary pass failed) (3 plays, 54 yards, 0:24)	NCSU 34–30

Statistics	UNC	NCSU
First downs	22	21
Total yards	444	360
Rushing yards	297	113
Passing yards	147	247
Turnovers	1	1
Time of possession	29:23	30:27

Team	Category	Player	Statistics
North Carolina	Passing	Sam Howell	14/26, 147 yards, TD, INT
North Carolina	Rushing	British Brooks	15 carries, 124 yards
North Carolina	Receiving	Josh Downs	8 receptions, 75 yards
N.C. State	Passing	Devin Leary	19/30, 247 yards, 4 TD
N.C. State	Rushing	Zonovan Knight	9 carries, 69 yards
N.C. State	Receiving	Emeka Emezie	5 receptions, 112 yards, 2 TD

=== Vs. South Carolina (Duke's Mayo Bowl) ===
North Carolina vs. South Carolina
(Duke's Mayo Bowl)

Team	1	2	3	4	Total
Tar Heels	0	13	8	0	21
• Gamecocks	18	7	7	6	38

- Date: December 30, 2021
- Location: Bank of America Stadium
  Charlotte, NC
- Game start: 11:30 a.m. EDT
- Elapsed time: 3 hours, 9 minutes
- Game attendance: 45,520
- Game weather: Temperature: 68 °F (20 °C) • Weather: Rainy • Wind: SW 7 MPH
- Referee: Reggie Smith (B1G)
- TV announcers (ESPN): Anish Shroff (play-by-play), Mike Golic Jr. (analyst), and Taylor McGregor (sideline)

Scoring summary
1	10:15	USC	Jaheim Bell 69 yd. pass from Dakereon Joyner (Parker White kick)	USC 7–0
1	7:45	USC	Jaheim Bell 66 yd. pass from Zeb Noland (Nick Muse pass from Kai Kroeger) (3 plays, 78 yards, 1:24)	USC 15–0
1	0:27	USC	Parker White 30 yd. field goal (9 plays, 54 yards, 5:14)	USC 18–0
2	13:11	UNC	British Brooks 63 yd. rush (Grayson Atkins kick) (6 plays, 75 yards, 2:16)	USC 18–7
2	5:44	UNC	Grayson Atkins 40 yd. field goal (8 plays, 50 yards, 3:30)	USC 18–10
2	2:27	USC	Juju McDowell 35 yd. rush (Parker White kick) (6 plays, 75 yards, 3:17)	USC 25–10
2	0:44	UNC	Grayson Atkins 36 yd. field goal (8 plays, 56 yards, 1:43)	USC 25–13
3	9:53	USC	Kevin Harris 1 yd. rush (Parker White kick) (9 plays, 75 yards, 5:07)	USC 32–13
3	7:24	UNC	Garrett Walston 37 yd. pass from Sam Howell (Ty Chandler rush) (6 plays, 75 yards, 2:29)	USC 32–21
4	7:44	USC	Parker White 22 yd. field goal (11 plays, 77 yards, 6:20)	USC 35–21
4	0:50	USC	Parker White 33 yd. field goal (10 plays, 61 yards, 5:02)	USC 38–21

Statistics	UNC	USC
First downs	14	27
Total yards	333	543
Rushing yards	128	301
Passing yards	205	242
Turnovers	0	0
Time of possession	20:58	39:02

Team	Category	Player	Statistics
North Carolina	Passing	Sam Howell	12/20, 205 yards, TD
North Carolina	Rushing	British Brooks	5 carries, 72 yards, TD
North Carolina	Receiving	Antoine Green	4 receptions, 73 yards
South Carolina	Passing	Dakereon Joyner	9/9, 160 yards, TD
South Carolina	Rushing	Kevin Harris	31 carries, 182 yards, TD
South Carolina	Receiving	Jaheim Bell	5 receptions, 159 yards, 2 TD

== Rankings ==
Ranking movements Legend: ██ Increase in ranking ██ Decrease in ranking — = Not ranked RV = Received votes
	Week															
Poll	Pre	1	2	3	4	5	6	7	8	9	10	11	12	13	14	Final
AP	10	24	21	21	RV	—	—	—	—	—	—	—	—	—	—	—
Coaches	9	22	19	20	RV	RV	—	—	—	—	—	—	—	—	—	—
CFP	Not released									—	—	—	—	—	—	Not released

== Players drafted into the NFL ==
Round	Pick	Player	Position	NFL Club
3	67	Joshua Ezeudu	OG	New York Giants
5	144	Sam Howell	QB	Washington Commanders
5	169	Ty Chandler	RB	Minnesota Vikings
5	173	Marcus McKethan	OG	New York Giants
