= List of The Carmichael Show episodes =

The Carmichael Show is an American television sitcom broadcast on NBC created by Jerrod Carmichael, Ari Katcher, Willie Hunter and Nicholas Stoller. The series premiered on August 26, 2015. Starring Carmichael, it follows a fictional version of his family. On May 15, 2016, NBC renewed the series for a 13-episode third season, which premiered on May 31, 2017. On June 30, 2017, NBC canceled the series after three seasons, and the series' finale aired on August 9, 2017.

During the course of the series, 32 episodes of The Carmichael Show aired over three seasons, between August 26, 2015, and August 9, 2017.

== Series overview ==
Season	Episodes	Originally released	
Season	Episodes	First released	Last released
1	6	August 26, 2015	September 9, 2015
2	13	March 9, 2016	May 29, 2016
3	13	May 31, 2017	August 9, 2017

== Episodes ==
=== Season 1 (2015) ===
No. overall	No. in season	Title	Directed by	Written by	Original release date	Prod. code	US viewers (millions)
1	1	"Pilot"	Mark Cendrowski	Story by : Nicholas Stoller & Jerrod Carmichael & Ari Katcher & Willie Hunter; Teleplay by : Nicholas Stoller & Jerrod Carmichael	August 26, 2015	1AYX01	4.83
Jerrod is reluctant to tell his parents, Joe and Cynthia, that he and Maxine are living together.
2	2	"Protest"	Gerry Cohen	Jerrod Carmichael & Ari Katcher	August 26, 2015	1AYX04	4.07
It's Jerrod's birthday and instead of celebrating, Maxine would rather go to a Black Lives Matter protest. Maxine's insistence to go the protest also encourages Cynthia to go as well.
3	3	"Kale"	Michael Zinberg	Mike Royce	September 2, 2015	1AYX02	4.77
Jerrod wants his parents to start eating healthier and even after Joe is rushed to the hospital, Joe and Cynthia want to continue their old eating ways.
4	4	"Gender"	Betsy Thomas	Mike Scully	September 2, 2015	1AYX05	3.90
Jerrod agrees to be a Big Brother for an underprivileged youth, until he is told an uncomfortable secret from his charge.
5	5	"Prayer"	Gerry Cohen	Austen Earl	September 9, 2015	1AYX03	4.60
A visit from Reverend Carlson (Isiah Whitlock, Jr.) leads to eye-opening conversation about religion, especially within Jerrod and Maxine's relationship.
6	6	"Guns"	Gerry Cohen	Aeysha Carr & Hunter Covington	September 9, 2015	1AYX06	3.80
After finding out that Jerrod had a gun in his possession, Maxine goes give it back to Joe, who gave Jerrod the gun. Cynthia then learns that Joe has a gun of his own in the house and is not pleased about it.

=== Season 2 (2016) ===
No. overall	No. in season	Title	Directed by	Written by	Original release date	Prod. code	US viewers (millions)
7	1	"Everybody Cheats"	Gerry Cohen	Jerrod Carmichael & Ari Katcher	March 9, 2016	2AYX01	4.09
Cynthia catches her best friend's husband cheating on his wife, which leads to a family discussion wherein Maxine reveals she cheated on her previous boyfriend with Jerrod.
8	2	"Fallen Heroes"	Gerry Cohen	Jerrod Carmichael & Mike Scully	March 13, 2016	2AYX02	6.49
For their 34th anniversary, Jerrod offers his parents tickets to see Bill Cosby in concert, which sparks a debate on whether they should go following Cosby's scandals.
9	3	"The Funeral"	Betsy Thomas	Hunter Covington	March 13, 2016	2AYX03	4.37
Joe's father passes away and he struggles over how to deliver the eulogy, given that the man was a lousy father and a horrible person. Marla Gibbs guest stars as Joe's mother.
10	4	"Perfect Storm"	Gerry Cohen	Jerrod Carmichael & Ari Katcher	March 20, 2016	2AYX05	5.06
A bedroom mishap for Jerrod and Maxine prompts a family discussion on birth control, while everyone seeks shelter in Joe and Cynthia's basement during a storm. Later, Jerrod and Maxine disagree on whether they should have children.
11	5	"Gentrifying Bobby"	Gerry Cohen	Laura Gutin Peterson	March 27, 2016	2AYX06	4.42
Just as Bobby is moving back into his and Nekeisha's apartment, they are evicted because neighborhood gentrification has made their rent unaffordable. Jerrod refuses to help his brother, however, believing Bobby needs to learn how to help himself rather than continue to let others bail him out.
12	6	"New Neighbors"	Michael Zinberg	Emily V. Gordon	April 3, 2016	2AYX07	4.68
Joe and Cynthia are immediately fearful of their new Muslim neighbors, Zayn and Fahmida (Fahim Anwar and Nazneen Contractor), but try to act friendly – that is, until a "suspicious-looking" package shows up on the neighbors' porch.
13	7	"Ex Con"	Betsy Thomas	Aeysha Carr	April 10, 2016	2AYX04	5.40
Jerrod's longtime friend Shawn (Antwon Tanner) gets out of prison after ten years, and Jerrod offers Shawn a place to stay until he gets back on his feet. Surprisingly, Maxine agrees, but Joe and Cynthia aren't so sure that Shawn has turned the corner. It turns out that their fears are warranted.
14	8	"The Blues"	Gerry Cohen	Willie Hunter	April 24, 2016	2AYX08	3.55
The Carmichaels realize Cynthia suffers from depression after Maxine walks in on her crying alone in the kitchen. Jerrod is determined not to let the problem be ignored, urging his mother to go into therapy despite Joe's protests and Cynthia's concerns about the stigma attached to the disease.
15	9	"Facebook Friends"	Gerry Cohen	Yassir Lester	May 1, 2016	2AYX09	4.23
Joe joins Facebook and receives a friend request from his high school girlfriend, which upsets Cynthia. Meanwhile, the family explores how social media can affect their relationships and what it means to create an online persona.
16	10	"Man's World"	Gerry Cohen	Mike Scully	May 8, 2016	2AYX10	3.29
When Maxine finds Jerrod's attitude about gender roles is more traditional than she'd thought, she challenges those notions, sending the Carmichael men to prove their masculinity by fixing the roof while Maxine tries to prove to Cynthia that a woman can change a tire without a man's help.
17	11	"Maxine's Dad"	Gerry Cohen	Spencer Sloan	May 15, 2016	2AYX11	3.59
When Maxine's wealthy father Grant (Adam Arkin) comes to town for her graduation, Jerrod and the family find themselves in the middle of a fight over independence, forcing them to debate what a child owes their parents and whether or not their love can be bought.
18	12	"Porn Addiction"	Gerry Cohen	Jerrod Carmichael & Ari Katcher	May 22, 2016	2AYX12	2.63
As the family returns from church, Cynthia is outraged because the pastor admitted during the service to watching pornography. This sparks a conversation in which the Carmichael men all admit to watching porn. Maxine then admits to watching porn herself, sometimes while Jerrod is in the next room sleeping, which makes Jerrod question if he is an adequate lover.
19	13	"President Trump"	Michael Zinberg	Jerrod Carmichael & Nicholas Stoller	May 29, 2016	2AYX13	2.25
Joe decides to vote for Donald Trump after meeting him, much to the dismay of Maxine, as each family member speaks up for their candidate. As an attempt to hear all sides of the election debate, Jerrod attends a Trump rally with Joe. Meanwhile, the political debate overshadows the announcement that Jerrod and Maxine got engaged.

=== Season 3 (2017) ===
No. overall	No. in season	Title	Directed by	Written by	Original release date	Prod. code	US viewers (millions)
20	1	"Yes Means Yes"	Gerry Cohen	Kevin Barnett & Josh Rabinowitz	May 31, 2017	3AYX02	4.01
Maxine learns that a friend of hers was raped about a year ago, but when she repeats the woman's description of the incident, Jerrod and Joe think the sex may have been consensual. A debate follows in which Maxine contends that waiting for the woman to say "no" isn't enough, and that a man must always get a verbal "yes" before proceeding to sex. This worries Bobby, who had a drunken hookup with his date the previous night and is now unsure that the sex met Maxine's criteria for consent.
21	2	"Support the Troops"	Gerry Cohen	Mike Scully	May 31, 2017	3AYX06	3.21
When Bobby and Jerrod accompany Joe on his weekly trip to hand out donuts at the local Army recruiting center, they see Kevin, a former neighborhood bully, who has just returned from basic training. Joe insists that his sons show respect for Kevin's service, but Jerrod refuses because Kevin used to beat up Bobby. Joe's respect is put to the test when Kevin needs someone to watch his dog while he is in Afghanistan, and later when Bobby goes to the recruiting office to enlist.
22	3	"Grandma Francis"	Gerry Cohen	Jerrod Carmichael & Ari Katcher	June 7, 2017	3AYX01	3.73
Joe and his sons take a trip to visit his mother, Francis (Marla Gibbs). Francis reveals her Alzheimer's is getting worse, then drops a bombshell: she wants her boys there to help her end her life.
23	4	"Lesbian Wedding"	Gerry Cohen	Robin Shorr	June 14, 2017	3AYX05	3.73
The Carmichaels prepare for Cynthia's niece's lesbian wedding, but Bobby doesn't want to go without a date. Maxine tries to set him up with her smart, successful, but unattractive coworker, sparking a discussion about inner versus outer beauty. Maxine becomes increasingly angry as the Carmichael men and even Cynthia say that the first thing anyone notices about her is that she's hot.
24	5	"Cynthia's Birthday"	Gerry Cohen	Ari Katcher & Jerrod Carmichael	June 21, 2017	3AYX03	3.92
On Cynthia's birthday, Jerrod offers to take her and the family to a high-end restaurant owned by the family of Drew, his high school pal. When Drew greets Jerrod, he playfully calls him the "n-word". Jerrod thinks nothing of it, because that's the way he and Drew talked, but the family has a debate about what it means when white people use that word and they consider leaving the restaurant.
25	6	"Shoot-Up-Able"	Gerry Cohen	Aeysha Carr	June 28, 2017	3AYX04	3.49
After Jerrod survives a shooting at a local mall in which three people are killed, he is irritated when his family coddles him and treats him like a victim. It is only after Jerrod talks to a police officer and tells what he saw that he begins to realize how lucky he is to be alive. Note: This episode was originally scheduled to air on June 14, but was replaced by "Lesbian Wedding" due to the Congressional baseball shooting and another shooting at a UPS facility in San Francisco.
26	7	"Morris"	Gerry Cohen	Andrew Lee	July 5, 2017	3AYX08	3.43
Bobby learns from a Facebook message that he has a half-brother named Morris. Jerrod confirms he learned at age 10 about his father's first child, who was born about a year before Joe married Cynthia, and has helped his dad keep the secret for the last 20 years. Bobby and Maxine confront Joe and insist that he finally come clean with Cynthia.
27	8	"Intervention"	Gerry Cohen	Willie Hunter	July 12, 2017	3AYX07	3.15
Nekeisha punches Bobby in the face after he dumps out two bottles of her booze, causing the family to become concerned that she is drinking too much. When Nekeisha admits she has at least a few drinks every night to relax, Maxine suggests meditation as another form of relaxation. But Maxine soon looks like a hypocrite when Nekeisha and Bobby discover that she takes Xanax at night to relieve anxiety and help her sleep.
28	9	"Evelyn and Vernon"	Gerry Cohen	Ajay Sahgal	July 19, 2017	3AYX10	3.23
After Maxine, Cynthia and Cynthia's mother Evelyn (Starletta DuPois) return from a women's rights march, Evelyn announces she wants to divorce her rude and verbally abusive husband, Vernon (Bill Cobbs). Cynthia blames Maxine for bringing them to the march and making Evelyn feel empowered, but Evelyn says she's been thinking about it for a long time. The revelation makes Joe realize how the news of his first son Morris is affecting his marriage to Cynthia.
29	10	"Maxine's Sister"	Gerry Cohen	Jerrod Carmichael & Ari Katcher	July 26, 2017	3AYX12	3.20
Maxine's baby sister Casey (Aurora Perrineau) pays a rare visit, and Bobby recognizes her as a stripper named Caramel Diva. Maxine is shocked and outraged at her sister's career choice, while Jerrod says there is nothing wrong with being a stripper. Jerrod changes his stance when Maxine accepts Casey's challenge to "walk a day" in her high-heeled shoes.
30	11	"Low Expectations"	Gerry Cohen	Rob Ulin	August 2, 2017	3AYX11	2.98
After having his injury treated by a former high school classmate who is now a doctor, Bobby proclaims he wants to go to college. His family scoffs at the idea, but Maxine says they should support him no matter what. However, Maxine is taken aback when Bobby says he wants to be a therapist, like her.
31	12	"Three Year Anniversary"	Gerry Cohen	Kevin Barnett & Josh Rabinowitz	August 9, 2017	3AYX09	2.83
Jerrod and Maxine are approached by an attractive woman in a bar, leading to a threesome. The family finds out what happened and their reaction indicates a double standard: Joe and Bobby are proud of Jerrod, but the men and Cynthia treat Maxine like a whore. Maxine later argues with Jerrod about not defending her. He apologizes and decides to show his love and dedication. The two then show up at the Carmichael home and announce they just got married.
32	13	"Gold Diggers"	Gerry Cohen	Kevin Barnett & Josh Rabinowitz	August 9, 2017	3AYX13	2.36
Bobby begins dating a much older woman named Janet (Margaret Avery), to which the family objects until they find out the woman is wealthy. As the family discusses how the breadwinner has the control in any couple, Maxine reveals she will soon receive a seven-figure inheritance from her rich grandmother, who is near death. Jerrod begins spending money frivolously, and soon realizes how money will change him. He insists that Maxine get a lawyer to draft a document stating that Jerrod has no claim to any of Maxine's inheritance.

== Ratings ==
The Carmichael Show : U.S. viewers per episode (millions)

Season	Episode number												
Season	1	2	3	4	5	6	7	8	9	10	11	12	13
1	4.83	4.07	4.77	3.90	4.60	3.80	–						
2	4.09	6.49	4.37	5.06	4.42	4.68	5.40	3.55	4.23	3.29	3.59	2.63	2.25
3	4.01	3.21	3.73	3.73	3.92	3.49	3.43	3.15	3.23	3.20	2.98	2.98	2.36

Audience measurement performed by Nielsen Media Research
