= Chris DeGeare =

American football player (born 1987)

No. 72, 62
- Position: Guard

Personal information
- Born: February 17, 1987 (age 39); Chandler, Arizona, U.S.
- Listed height: 6 ft 4 in (1.93 m)
- Listed weight: 335 lb (152 kg)

Career information
- High school: Robert B. Glenn (Kernersville, North Carolina)
- College: Wake Forest
- NFL draft: 2010: 5th round, 161st overall pick

Career history
- Minnesota Vikings (2010−2011); Tennessee Titans (2012); New York Giants (2013)*; Dallas Cowboys (2014)*
- * Offseason or practice squad member only

Career NFL statistics
- Games played: 8
- Games started: 5
- Stats at Pro Football Reference

Chris DeGeare (born February 17, 1987, Arizona, U.S.) is an American former professional football player who was an offensive guard in the National Football League (NFL). He played college football for the Wake Forest Demon Deacons and was selected by the Minnesota Vikings in the fifth round of the 2010 NFL draft.

== College career ==
DeGeare played high school football for Robert B. Glenn High School in Kernersville, NC, where he graduated in 2005. He played college football at Wake Forest University.

== Professional career ==
=== Minnesota Vikings ===
On August 31, 2012, as the Vikings reduced their roster down to league maximum of 53 players, he was released.

=== Tennessee Titans ===
On September 5, 2012, he was added to the Tennessee Titans practice squad.

=== New York Giants ===
On January 8, 2013, DeGeare signed a reserve/future contract with the New York Giants. On August 20, 2013, he was waived/injured by the Giants. On August 21, 2013, he cleared waivers and was placed on the Giants' injured reserve list.

=== Dallas Cowboys ===
On January 8, 2014, DeGeare was signed to a reserve/future contract by the Dallas Cowboys.

== Personal life ==
In 2012, DeGeare married Moraya Seeger Jackson, a marriage and family therapist. She is a granddaughter of folk singer and activist, Pete Seeger. Their child was born in 2015.
