= Robert B. Glenn High School =

American public school in North Carolina

Location
- 1600 Union Cross Rd; Kernersville, North Carolina 27284; United States
- Coordinates: 36°04′05″N 80°06′49″W

Information
- Type: Public high school
- Established: 1950 (76 years ago)
- School district: Winston-Salem/Forsyth County Schools
- Superintendent: Dr. Don Phipps
- Principal: Walter Johnson
- Staff: 91.62 (on an FTE basis)
- Grades: 9–12
- Student to teacher ratio: 16.01
- Colors: Orange and royal blue
- Mascot: Bobcat
- Newspaper: The Howler
- Yearbook: Echoes
- Website: www.wsfcs.k12.nc.us/ghs

Robert B. Glenn High School (commonly known as Glenn High School) is located in the town of Kernersville in Forsyth County, North Carolina. It is laid out in a college-campus style with numerous small buildings rather than a single large building.

== History ==
Robert B. Glenn High School opened in the fall of 1950, under the name of the 51st Governor of North Carolina, Robert Broadnax Glenn (1854–1920). In 1962, it became a junior high school with the opening of East Forsyth High School. In 1984, it was changed back as a four-year high school again.

== Athletics ==
Glenn is a member of the North Carolina High School Athletic Association (NCHSAA). The school's athletic programs include: Baseball, Basketball, Soccer, Dance Team, Cheerleading, Softball, Cross Country, Swimming, Tennis, Football, Volleyball, Golf, Wrestling, Track, and Lacrosse.

The 1986 men's outdoor track & field team won the NCHSAA 3A/4A state championship. The 1992 baseball team won the NCHSAA 4A state championship, finishing the season with a 27–2 record. Individual state championships have been won in track & field, cross country, and wrestling.

Glenn's main rival is East Forsyth High School. In football, the Glenn-East game is one of the most anticipated games of the year.

== Facilities ==
Glenn currently has a total of seven main classroom buildings, the newest one was built during the 2009–2010 school year and opened for the 2010–2011 school year. There are also two gyms, an auditorium, cafeteria, courtyard, dance studio, football stadium, and an office building plus a library.

== Notable alumni ==
- Jerrod Carmichael — actor, best known as creator and lead role of NBC's The Carmichael Show
- Ric Converse — professional wrestler for CWF Mid-Atlantic
- Chris DeGeare — NFL offensive lineman
- Ray Farmer — former NFL player and general manager
- Josh Hawkins — NFL defensive back
- Josh Howard — NBA player
- Randy Jones — American bobsledder, competed in both the 2-man and 4-man events in four Winter Olympics
- Darwin Joston — actor
- Chris Lane — country music singer-songwriter
- Jahvaree Ritzie — college football defensive tackle
- Kevin Thompson — professional basketball player
- Tory Woodbury — NFL quarterback/wide receiver
- 9th Wonder — hip hop record producer, record executive, DJ, lecturer, and rapper
