= On the Count of Three =

2021 film by Jerrod Carmichael

- Theatrical release poster
- Directed by: Jerrod Carmichael
- Written by: Ari Katcher; Ryan Welch
- Produced by: David Carrico; Adam Paulsen; Jerrod Carmichael; Jimmy Price; Ari Katcher; Tom Werner; Jake Densen
- Starring: Jerrod Carmichael; Christopher Abbott; Tiffany Haddish; J. B. Smoove; Lavell Crawford; Henry Winkler
- Cinematography: Marshall Adams
- Edited by: Tom Eagles
- Music by: Owen Pallett
- Production companies: Valparaiso Pictures; Werner Entertainment; Morningside Entertainment
- Distributed by: Annapurna Pictures; Orion Pictures (through United Artists Releasing); Hulu
- Release dates: January 29, 2021 (Sundance); May 13, 2022 (United States)
- Running time: 86 minutes
- Country: United States
- Language: English
- Box office: $62,155

On the Count of Three is a 2021 American dark comedy drama film directed by Jerrod Carmichael (in his feature directorial debut) and written by Ari Katcher and Ryan Welch. It stars Carmichael and Christopher Abbott as two best friends who make a suicide pact and spend their final day taking care of unfinished business, with one taking out his violent and hedonistic desires whilst the other learns to value life. The supporting cast includes Tiffany Haddish, J. B. Smoove, Lavell Crawford, and Henry Winkler.

On the Count of Three had its world premiere at the 2021 Sundance Film Festival, and was released in select theaters and on-demand by Annapurna Pictures and Orion Pictures through United Artists Releasing on May 13, 2022. It received generally positive reviews.

== Plot ==
Despite being offered a promotion, depressed mulch factory worker Val attempts suicide in a toilet stall at work, but stops when his annoying co-worker enters the restroom singing "It's a Great Day to Be Alive" by Travis Tritt to himself. Val breaks up with his girlfriend, Natasha, quits his job, then helps his best friend Kevin escape from the psychiatric hospital in which he was placed three days earlier after attempting suicide himself.

Val tells Kevin of his suicide attempt and depressive thoughts, and the two make a pact to simultaneously shoot each other. Kevin panics and smacks Val's hand away when Val pulls the trigger, then convinces Val that they should make the most of their last day of life and kill themselves at the end of the day.

At a diner, Kevin encounters his childhood bully, who continues to taunt him and show no remorse for his former actions, even getting his wife to join in, while Kevin quietly becomes enraged.

Leaving the diner, Kevin sets his mind on killing Dr. Brenner, a child psychiatrist who molested him as a child, despite Val trying to dissuade him. Upon arriving at Brenner's office, they learn that he won't be in until later that day, so they pass time riding dirt bikes, where Val falls off his bike and cuts his leg. The two go to a gas station to get gauze for Val's leg where they encounter a rude clerk, whom Kevin robs at gunpoint and urges to be more polite.

Kevin and Val then head to the repair shop owned by Val's neglectful and abusive father, Lyndell, who stole $2,300 from him, when he left and whom he hasn't seen since. Although Lyndell initially tries to make amends with his son, Val remains cold and only wants his money back. The two break out into a fight, in which Val get severely beaten, until Kevin intervenes and knocks Lyndell out with a tire iron. They steal the money from the register and leave.

Val then learns that Natasha is pregnant with his child. He returns an engagement ring he bought her and attempts to give her the cash he stole from his father instead, which she rejects and encourages him to see a therapist. Meanwhile Kevin drives to the lake where his bully and family hang out and pulls out a handgun from the glove compartment, but ultimately leaves without doing anything.

Kevin drives to Dr. Brenner's office, where Val tells him he's glad they lived through the day and that he no longer wants to commit suicide. Kevin enters the building alone to confront Dr. Brenner, who initially doesn't recognize him. Kevin forces Brenner to get on his knees and attempts to shoot him, but forgets to take the safety off, so Brenner hits Kevin and takes the gun away from him. Val sees Brenner waving the gun at an injured Kevin; mistakenly thinking Brenner is about to kill Kevin, Val shoots Brenner in the head.

Val and Kevin flee the scene, pursued by police. Kevin tries to convince Val that suicide is still the answer to their problems, but Val does not change his mind about living. Surrounded by police with no way out, Kevin tells Val to pin Brenner's murder on him in order to lessen his sentence, quipping that he remembered to take off the safety. Val attempts to convince Kevin of the good that comes with life, and how he will help him through the legal process, but a pessimistic Kevin shrugs him off. Kevin walks away from Val, and shoots himself in the mouth.

A few years later, Val receives a Father's Day visit in prison from Natasha and their daughter. The camera moves out slowly showing a room full of other families.

== Cast ==
- Jerrod Carmichael as Val
- Christopher Abbott as Kevin
- Tiffany Haddish as Natasha
- Lavell Crawford as Donny
- J. B. Smoove as Lyndell
- Henry Winkler as Dr. Brenner
- Ryan McDonald as Brian
- Jared Abrahamson as Wyatt

== Production ==
In June 2019, it was announced that Jerrod Carmichael and Christopher Abbott would star in the film and that Carmichael would make his directorial debut from a screenplay by Ari Katcher and Ryan Welch. In November, it was announced that Tiffany Haddish, Henry Winkler, J. B. Smoove, and Lavell Crawford had joined the cast. David Carrico and Adam Paulsen agreed to produce under their Valparaiso Pictures banner, alongside Tom Werner serving as a producer under his Werner Entertainment banner. Principal photography began later that month.

== Release ==
The film had its world premiere at the 2021 Sundance Film Festival, where Katcher and Welch were awarded the Waldo Salt Screenwriting Award. In February 2021, Annapurna Pictures acquired North American distribution rights to the film for around $2 million, releasing it under its distribution pact with MGM's Orion Pictures through their joint venture United Artists Releasing. The film's first trailer was released on April 27, 2022, beginning with a slate promoting the National Suicide Prevention Lifeline. It received a limited theatrical release and a digital release on May 13, 2022. It was also released on the streaming service Hulu and labeled as part of their "Hulu Originals" on August 17.

== Reception ==
=== Box office ===
In the United States and Canada, the film earned $36,822 from 19 theaters in its opening weekend. It ultimately grossed between $62,131 and $62,155 at the worldwide box office.

=== Critical response ===
On Rotten Tomatoes, the film holds an approval rating of 85% based on 118 reviews, with an average rating of 7.1/10. The website's critics consensus reads, "It's occasionally uneven, but On the Count of Three finds director/star Jerrod Carmichael attempting an ambitious blend of drama and dark comedy—and often succeeding." Metacritic, which uses a weighted average, assigned the film a score of 74 out of 100, based on 24 critics, indicating "generally favorable" reviews.

David Ehrlich of IndieWire gave the film an A− and wrote, "Like a game of Russian roulette, this is a movie that would have seemed embarrassingly stupid if things had gone wrong. It's a dangerous and somehow enjoyable movie that dances around the edge of an open wound from start to finish as it risks making light of the heaviest things that so many of its viewers will ever have to carry. But it's exhilarating—a little at first, and then a hell of a lot—to see these characters find the kind of happiness worth dying for." Benjamin Lee of The Guardian gave the film 3/5 stars and said, "While it's ultimately a little too messy to work quite as well as it could have, given the interesting and ambitious ingredients, On the Count of Three is proof that Carmichael is a director to be excited about, hoping that perhaps he finds time to write his next script himself."

=== Accolades ===
Year	Award	Category	Subject	Result
2021	Sundance Film Festival	Grand Jury Prize - US Dramatic	Jerrod Carmichael	Nominated
2021	Sundance Film Festival	Waldo Salt Screenwriting Award	Ari Katcher; Ryan Welch	Won
2021	IndieWire Critics Poll	Best Films Opening in 2022	On the Count of Three	Nominated
