= Jerrod Carmichael Reality Show =

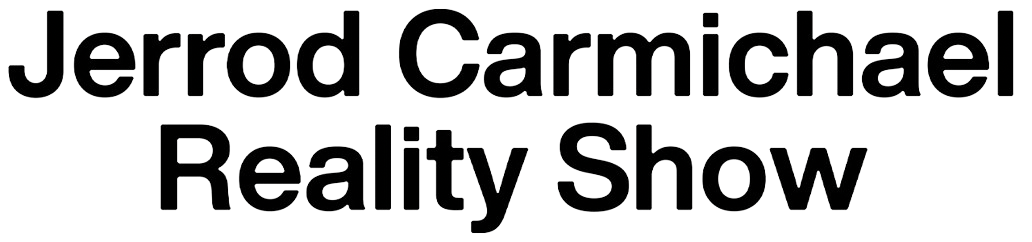
- Directed by: Ari Katcher
- Country of origin: United States
- Original language: English
- No. of seasons: 1
- No. of episodes: 8

Production
- Executive producers: Jerrod Carmichael; Ari Katcher; Eli Despres; Josh Kreigman; Elyse Steinberg; Susie Fox
- Producer: Maya Seidler
- Running time: 30 minutes
- Production companies: HBO Entertainment; Edgeline Films; Morningside Entertainment

Original release
- Network: HBO
- Release: March 29 – May 17, 2024

Jerrod Carmichael Reality Show is an American documentary series directed by Ari Katcher. It follows comedian Jerrod Carmichael as he interacts with family, friends, and strangers in his quest for love, sex, and connection. It had its world premiere at South by Southwest on March 10, 2024, and premiered on HBO 19 days later.

== Episodes ==
No.	Title	Directed by	Original release date
1	"Emmys"	Ari Katcher	March 29, 2024
Jerrod's experiment in radical honesty begins. He confronts a friend to whom he has recently confessed romantic feelings, avoids his religious mother who struggles with his homosexuality, and scrambles to find a date for the Emmys. His crush is revealed to be rapper Tyler, the Creator. He invites Tyler to be his date for the Emmys, but is rejected before having a conversation with Tyler about their friendship. He ends up bringing a different friend, a balaclava-wearing man with a distorted voice referred to as Anonymous, (Note: The identity of Anonymous is never stated in the show, but has been generally accepted as being Carmichael's close friend and collaborator Bo Burnham.) to the Emmys. He microdoses mushrooms on the way to the Emmys, where he wins Outstanding Writing for a Variety Special for his comedy special Rothaniel, and becomes sick on the way home.
2	"Mike"	Ari Katcher	April 5, 2024
Jerrod introduces his boyfriend Mike, a writer who is working towards his master's degree at the University of Iowa while spending weekends with Jerrod in New York City. On one of the weekdays when Mike is back in Iowa, Jerrod calls a Grindr hook-up. His friend and fellow comedian Jamar Neighbors sees this, and both Jerrod and Jamar mention it in their respective stand-up comedy routines. Jerrod reads up on sex addiction and starts going to a therapist when some of it resonates with him. Mike attends one of these therapy sessions after learning about the recent hook-up, and they have a discussion about monogamy; when Michael leaves town again, Jerrod goes back to Grindr.
3	"Friendship"	Ari Katcher	April 12, 2024
4	"Road Trip"	Ari Katcher	April 19, 2024
5	"Jamar"	Ari Katcher	April 26, 2024
6	"Homecoming"	Ari Katcher	May 3, 2024
7	"Opening"	Ari Katcher	May 10, 2024
8	"Cynthia"	Ari Katcher	May 17, 2024

== Production ==
In February 2023, it was announced HBO had ordered a documentary series revolving around Jerrod Carmichael, with Ari Katcher set to direct.

== Reception ==
On the review aggregator website Rotten Tomatoes, 95% of 22 critics' reviews are positive. The website's consensus reads: "Following comedian Jerrod Carmichael with an almost painful sense of intimacy, Reality Show feels more sculpted by authorial intent than spontaneity but achieves the same ends of laying its subject bare." On Metacritic, the series holds a weighted average score of 83 out of 100, based on 14 critics.

== Awards and nominations ==
Year	Award	Category	Nominee(s)	Result	Ref.
2024	Gotham TV Awards	Breakthrough Nonfiction Series	Jerrod Carmichael Reality Show	Won	
2024	Television Critics Association Awards	Outstanding Achievement in Reality Programming	Jerrod Carmichael Reality Show	Nominated	
