= Jahvaree Ritzie =

American football player (born 2003)

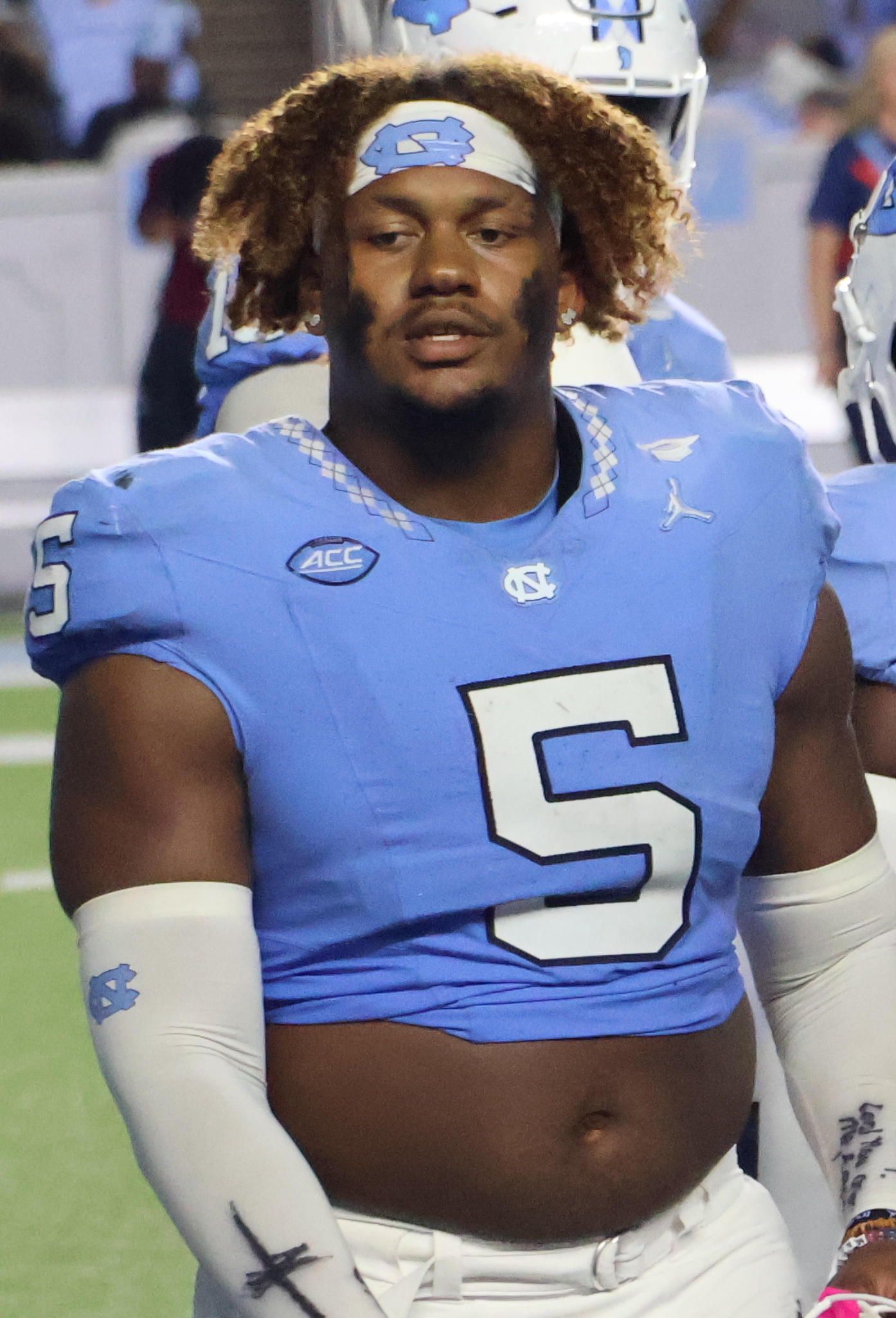
- Ritzie with the Tar Heels in 2024

No. 96 – Minnesota Vikings
- Position: Nose tackle
- Roster status: Practice squad

Personal information
- Born: January 31, 2003 (age 23); Kernersville, North Carolina, U.S.
- Listed height: 6 ft 4 in (1.93 m)
- Listed weight: 290 lb (132 kg)

Career information
- High school: Glenn (Kernersville)
- College: North Carolina (2021–2024)
- NFL draft: 2025: undrafted

Career history
- New England Patriots (2025)*; Pittsburgh Steelers (2026)*; Minnesota Vikings (2026–present)*
- * Offseason or practice squad member only

Awards and highlights
- Third-team All-ACC (2024)
- Stats at Pro Football Reference

Jahvaree Ritzie (born January 31, 2003) is an American professional football nose tackle for the Minnesota Vikings of the National Football League (NFL). He played college football for the North Carolina Tar Heels.

== Early life ==
Ritzie attended Robert B. Glenn High School in Kernersville, North Carolina. He was rated as a four-star recruit and committed to play college football for the North Carolina Tar Heels over other schools such as Georgia, South Carolina, Ohio State, and Tennessee.

== College career ==
In his first three collegiate seasons from 2021 to 2023, Ritzie appeared in 39 games for the Tar Heels, where he totaled 98 tackles with five being for a loss, two and a half sacks, a pass deflection, and a forced fumble, for North Carolina. In the 2024 season opener, he notched three sacks in a win over the Minnesota Golden Gophers and was named the Atlantic Coast Conference (ACC) defensive lineman of the week. In week 9, Ritzie intercepted a pass which he returned 84 yards for a touchdown, while also notching a tackle for a loss and a sack, in a win over the Virginia Cavaliers.

== Professional career ==
Pre-draft measurables
| Height | Weight | Arm length | Hand span | Wingspan | 40-yard dash | 10-yard split | 20-yard split | Vertical jump | Broad jump | Bench press |
|---|---|---|---|---|---|---|---|---|---|---|
| 6 ft 4 1/4 in (1.94 m) | 294 lb (133 kg) | 33 1/4 in (0.84 m) | 10 1/4 in (0.26 m) | 6 ft 9 1/8 in (2.06 m) | 5.02 s | 1.70 s | 2.81 s | 36.0 in (0.91 m) | 9 ft 6 in (2.90 m) | 26 reps |
All values from NFL Combine/Pro Day

=== New England Patriots ===
On May 9, 2025, Ritzie signed with the New England Patriots as an undrafted free agent after going unselected in the 2025 NFL draft. On August 26, he was waived by the Patriots as part of final roster cuts and signed to the practice squad the following day. On September 2, Ritzie was released from the practice squad.

=== Pittsburgh Steelers ===
On January 22, 2026, Ritzie signed a reserve/future contract with the Pittsburgh Steelers. He was waived by the Steelers on May 26.

=== Minnesota Vikings ===
On June 16, 2026, Ritzie signed with the Minnesota Vikings. On August 30, he was waived by the Vikings as a part of final roster cuts. Ritzie was re–signed to the Vikings' practice squad the next day.
