= The Carmichael Show =

American sitcom television series

- Genre: Sitcom
- Created by: Jerrod Carmichael; Ari Katcher; Willie Hunter; Nicholas Stoller
- Starring: Jerrod Carmichael; Amber Stevens West; Lil Rel Howery; Tiffany Haddish; Loretta Devine; David Alan Grier
- Theme music composer: Daniel Hall
- Country of origin: United States
- Original language: English
- No. of seasons: 3
- No. of episodes: 32 (list of episodes)

Production
- Executive producers: Jerrod Carmichael; Nicholas Stoller; Ravi Nandan; Danielle Sanchez-Witzel
- Cinematography: Gary Baum
- Camera setup: Multi-camera
- Running time: 22 minutes
- Production companies: Morningside Entertainment; A24; Stoller Global Solutions; Lunch Bag Snail Productions; Universal Television; 20th Century Fox Television

Original release
- Network: NBC
- Release: August 26, 2015 – August 9, 2017

The Carmichael Show is an American sitcom television series created by Nicholas Stoller, Jerrod Carmichael, Ari Katcher, and Willie Hunter that aired on NBC from August 26, 2015, until August 9, 2017. Starring Carmichael, it follows a fictional version of his family. The multi-camera show is set in Charlotte, North Carolina.

On May 15, 2016, NBC renewed the series for a 13-episode third season, which premiered with back-to-back episodes on May 31, 2017. On June 30, 2017, NBC canceled the series after three seasons, and the series finale aired on August 9, 2017. The series received positive reviews throughout its run.

== Premise ==
The Carmichael Show follows a fictional version of comedian Jerrod Carmichael's family, set in Charlotte, North Carolina. Family members include Jerrod's father Joe, mother Cynthia, and brother Bobby. Other characters include Jerrod's live-in girlfriend (later wife) Maxine, and Bobby's estranged wife Nekeisha. Episodes often tackle serious societal issues and current events in a humorous context.

== Cast and characters ==
- Jerrod Carmichael as the titular protagonist of the show, a fictional version of himself.
- Amber Stevens West as Maxine North (later Maxine North-Carmichael), Jerrod's girlfriend. Jerrod and Maxine get married towards the end of the third season.
- Lil Rel Howery as Robert "Bobby" Carmichael, Jerrod's brother.
- Tiffany Haddish as Nekeisha Williams-Carmichael, Bobby's estranged (later, ex-) wife and, from mid-series, roommate.
- Loretta Devine as Cynthia Carmichael, Joe's wife and the mother of Jerrod and Bobby.
- David Alan Grier as Joe Carmichael, Cynthia's husband and the father of Jerrod and Bobby.

== Episodes ==
Season	Episodes	Originally released	
Season	Episodes	First released	Last released
1	6	August 26, 2015	September 9, 2015
2	13	March 9, 2016	May 29, 2016
3	13	May 31, 2017	August 9, 2017

== Production ==
=== Development and filming ===
Carmichael began developing and executive producing the series in November 2014, based upon his real life as a stand-up and his family. On December 18, 2014, the series was given the title Go Jerrod, Go. On March 10, 2015, NBC ordered the pilot to series under the final title The Carmichael Show, with six episodes to air during the summer.

On September 14, 2015, the series was renewed by NBC for a second season of 13 episodes, which premiered on Wednesday, March 9 with a sneak preview episode after The Voice. It then premiered in its regular timeslot Sunday, March 13, 2016, at 9/8c with back-to-back episodes.

On June 14, 2017, after mass shootings in Virginia and San Francisco, NBC pulled the episode "Shoot-Up-Able," which saw Carmichael's character surviving a mass shooting physically unharmed but psychologically scarred, from airing. It eventually aired on June 28.

=== Casting ===
On December 18, 2014, Loretta Devine was cast as Carmichael's mother, and Amber Stevens West as Carmichael's girlfriend. On January 5, 2015, David Alan Grier was cast to play Carmichael's father. On January 7, 2015, Lil Rel Howery was cast to play Carmichael's brother.

== Reception ==
=== Ratings ===
Season	Time slot (ET)	Episodes	Premiered		Ended		TV season	Rank	Viewers (in millions)
Season	Time slot (ET)	Episodes	Date	Viewers (in millions)	Date	Viewers (in millions)	TV season	Rank	Viewers (in millions)
1	Wednesday 9:00 pm Wednesday 9:30 pm	6	August 26, 2015	4.83	September 9, 2015	3.80	2014–2015	#94	N/A
2	Wednesday 10:00 pm (Premiere); Sunday; 9:00 pm (2-12); Sunday; 8:00 pm (Finale)	13	March 9, 2016	4.09	May 29, 2016	2.25	2015–2016	#100	4.76
3	Wednesday 9:00 pm	13	May 31, 2017	4.01	August 9, 2017	2.36	2016–2017		

=== Critical reception ===
The series has received positive reviews. On Metacritic, the first season has a score of 64 out of 100, based on 15 critics, generally praising the show for its originality; one described it as "a smart and crafty comedy". The second season received better reviews, with a score of 80 out of 100 on Metacritic, indicative of "generally favorable reviews"; critics praise the series for its writing and the topics it discusses. The third season also received "generally favorable reviews" with a score of 79 out of 100, based on 8 critics.

On Rotten Tomatoes, the first season has received 72% "fresh" ratings, with an average rating of 6.1. The second season received 100% "fresh" ratings, with an average rating of 8.4. As of late 2022, the third season has received an 89% "fresh" rating on Rotten Tomatoes, with an average rating of 7.8. TV critic Alan Sepinwall wrote, with regard to the third season, "Few sitcoms are built to handle the kind of provocative content that The Carmichael Show embraces as its reason for being... Carmichael not only keeps the jokes flying the whole time, but makes them better when it's at its most Very Special."

=== Accolades ===
Year	Association	Category	Nominee(s)	Result	Refs
2016	GLAAD Media Awards	Outstanding Individual Episode (in a series without a regular LGBT character)	The Carmichael Show (Episode: "Gender")	Nominated	
2016	Image Awards	Outstanding Actress in a Comedy Series	Loretta Devine	Nominated	
2016	Image Awards	Outstanding Supporting Actor in a Comedy Series	David Alan Grier	Nominated	
2017	NAACP Image Awards	Outstanding Comedy Series	The Carmichael Show	Nominated	
2017	NAACP Image Awards	Outstanding Supporting Actor in a Comedy Series	David Alan Grier	Nominated	
