= Jerrod Carmichael =

American comedian (born 1987)

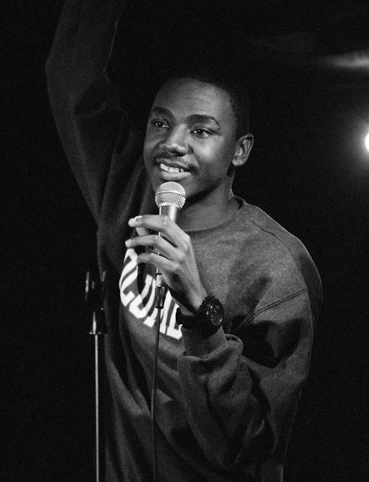
- Carmichael performing in May 2013
- Born: Rothaniel Jerrod Carmichael; April 6, 1987 (age 39); Winston-Salem, North Carolina, U.S.
- Occupations: Comedian; actor; filmmaker
- Years active: 2008–present

Rothaniel Jerrod Carmichael (/dʒəˈrɒd/ jə-ROD; born April 6, 1987) is an American comedian, actor, writer, and filmmaker.

Born in Winston-Salem, North Carolina, he later moved to Los Angeles, where his career began in the early 2010s comedy club scene. Carmichael has since released four stand-up comedy specials on HBO: Love at the Store (2014), 8 (2017), Rothaniel (2022), and Don't Be Gay (2025), the third of which won the Primetime Emmy Award for Outstanding Writing for a Variety Special. He also co-created, co-wrote, produced, and starred in the semi autobiographical NBC sitcom The Carmichael Show (2015–2017).

Carmichael made his feature film directorial debut when he directed, produced, and starred in the dark comedy film On the Count of Three (2021). In 2022, he was nominated for the Primetime Emmy Award for Outstanding Guest Actor in a Comedy Series for guest hosting an episode of Saturday Night Live.

In 2023, Carmichael hosted the 80th Golden Globe Awards and appeared in the Academy Award-winning film Poor Things. In 2024, he was the subject of the HBO documentary series, Jerrod Carmichael Reality Show, which had its world premiere at South by Southwest.

== Early life ==
Rothaniel Jerrod Carmichael was born in Winston-Salem, North Carolina, on April 6, 1987. He has one older brother named Joe. He grew up poor, which is a frequent topic in his stand-up comedy work. In fifth grade, he hosted a morning news show on his elementary school's local access channel.

In 2005, he graduated from Robert B. Glenn High School in Kernersville, North Carolina.

== Career ==
Carmichael moved to Los Angeles at the age of 20 to pursue a stand-up comedy career, despite never having tried it before. His first time doing stand-up was at an open mic night at The Comedy Store in West Hollywood. Working his way up through the comedy clubs, he appeared in the "New Faces" showcase at the 2011 Just for Laughs Festival in Montreal. He appeared on the show The Goodwin Games (2013) and had his breakout role as an actor in the film Neighbors (2014). His first HBO stand-up comedy special, Love at the Store (2014), was directed by Spike Lee and filmed at The Comedy Store.

Carmichael's second stand-up comedy special, 8 (2017), was directed by friend and fellow comedian Bo Burnham and filmed in the Grand Lodge Room of New York's Masonic Hall. Carmichael next co-created, co-wrote, produced, and starred in the semi-biographical NBC sitcom The Carmichael Show (2015–2017), which was well-received and was notable for broaching topics including the Black Lives Matter movement, LGBT issues, gun rights, politics, and the reality of being black in America. He also served as an executive producer for the Fox sitcom Rel (2018–2019) and directed Drew Michael's stand-up comedy special Drew Michael (2018), which was acclaimed for its "unusual style".

Carmichael made an appearance on rapper Tyler, the Creator's album Igor (2019), narrating the album using short phrases to find logic in the title character Igor's state of mind. That same year, he was hired by Quentin Tarantino to co-write a film adaptation based on the Django/Zorro crossover comic book series. He created, directed, produced, and starred in the HBO autobiographical documentaries Home Videos (2019) and Sermon on the Mount (2019).

His feature film directorial debut, On the Count of Three, competed in the U.S. Dramatic Competition at the 2021 Sundance Film Festival; Carmichael directed, produced, and starred in the film.

His third HBO special, Rothaniel (2022), was also directed by Burnham and earned Carmichael the Primetime Emmy Award for Outstanding Writing for a Variety Special. Two days after the release of Rothaniel, Carmichael hosted Saturday Night Live for the first time, for which he was nominated for the Primetime Emmy Award for Outstanding Guest Actor in a Comedy Series. He also won the Writers Guild of America Award for Best Television Writing in a Comedy/Variety Specials for his work writing Rothaniel.

In 2023, Carmichael hosted the 80th Golden Globe Awards. That year, he also appeared in the Academy Award-winning film Poor Things alongside Emma Stone.

In 2024, he starred in Jerrod Carmichael Reality Show, an HBO documentary series revolving around his life. The series screened at South by Southwest on March 10, 2024, before being released on HBO 19 days later.

On May 24, 2025, his fourth special Don't Be Gay premiered on HBO's streaming service Max.

== Influences ==
His early comedic influences were George Carlin, Bill Cosby, Richard Pryor, and Sinbad.

== Personal life ==
Carmichael lives in New York City. He has discussed his relationships with both men and women in his work, before coming out as gay in his comedy special Rothaniel (2022).

== Filmography ==
=== Film ===
Year	Title	Role	Notes
2014	Neighbors	Garfield "Garf" Slade	
2015	The Meddler	Freddy	
2016	Neighbors 2: Sorority Rising	Garfield "Garf" Slade	
2017	The Disaster Artist	Actor Friend	
2017	Transformers: The Last Knight	Jimmy	
2017	Ferdinand	Paco	Voice
2018	Mid90s	Security Guard	Uncredited
2021	On the Count of Three	Val	Also director and producer
2023	Poor Things	Harry Astley	

=== Television ===
Year	Title	Credited as					Role	Notes
Year	Title	Actor	Director	Writer	Creator	Producer	Role	Notes
2013	The Goodwin Games	Yes					Elijah	3 episodes
2013	Comedy Bang! Bang!	Yes					Pranked Guy	Episode: "Zoe Saldana Wears a Tan Blouse & Glasses"
2013	Axe Cop	Yes					Guy	Voice, episode: "Babysitting Uni-Baby"
2014	Love at the Store	Yes		Yes	Yes		Himself	Stand-up comedy special
2014–2015	Lucas Bros Moving Co.	Yes					Jerrod	Voice, 14 episodes
2015–2017	The Carmichael Show	Yes		Yes	Yes	Yes	Jerrod Carmichael	32 episodes
2016	The Chris Gethard Show	Yes					Himself	Episode: "Family Dinner"
2017	8	Yes		Yes	Yes		Himself	Stand-up comedy special
2018	Drew Michael: Drew Michael		Yes		Yes			Stand-up comedy special
2018–2019	Rel					Yes		Executive producer
2019	The Shop	Yes					Himself	Episode: #2.1
2019	Ramy					Yes		
2019	Home Videos	Yes	Yes	Yes	Yes	Yes	Himself	Documentary
2019	Sermon on the Mount	Yes	Yes	Yes	Yes	Yes	Himself	Documentary
2022	Rothaniel	Yes		Yes	Yes		Himself	Stand-up comedy special
2022	Saturday Night Live	Yes					Himself (host)	Episode 16 of Season 47: "Jerrod Carmichael/Gunna"
2023	80th Golden Globe Awards	Yes					Himself (host)	Television special
2024	Jerrod Carmichael Reality Show					Yes	Himself	Documentary series
2025	RuPaul's Drag Race						Himself	Guest judge (Season 17, episode 12)
2025	Don't Be Gay	Yes		Yes	Yes		Himself	Stand-up comedy special

=== Music videos ===
Year	Song	Artist	Director	Role
2017	"Moonlight"	Jay-Z	Alan Yang	Ross Geller

== Awards and nominations ==
Association	Year	Category	Work	Result	Ref.
Black Reel Awards	2018	Outstanding Actor, Comedy Series	The Carmichael Show	Nominated	
Black Reel Awards	2022	Outstanding Variety, Talk or Sketch – Series or Special	Jerrod Carmichael: Rothaniel	Nominated	
Black Reel Awards	2024	Outstanding Breakthrough Performance	Poor Things	Nominated	
Critics' Choice Television Awards	2023	Best Comedy Special	Jerrod Carmichael: Rothaniel	Nominated	
Dorian Awards	2022	Wilde Wit	—N/a	Nominated	
Dorian Awards	2022	LGBTQIA+ Trailblazer	—N/a	Won	
Gotham Awards	2019	Breakthrough Series – Short Form	Ramy	Nominated	
Gotham TV Awards	2024	Breakthrough Nonfiction Series	Jerrod Carmichael Reality Show	Won	
NAACP Image Awards	2023	Outstanding Writing in a Television Movie or Special	Jerrod Carmichael: Rothaniel	Nominated	
Primetime Emmy Awards (Creative Arts)	2022	Outstanding Guest Actor in a Comedy Series	Saturday Night Live	Nominated	
Primetime Emmy Awards	2022	Outstanding Writing for a Variety Special	Jerrod Carmichael: Rothaniel	Won	
Sundance Film Festival	2021	Grand Jury Prize – U.S. Dramatic Competition	On the Count of Three	Nominated	
Writers Guild of America Awards	2023	Best Television Writing in a Comedy/Variety Specials	Jerrod Carmichael: Rothaniel	Won	

== See also ==
- List of LGBT people from New York City
